= 2016–17 Birmingham City F.C. season =

Birmingham City F.C.
2016–17 season
- Owner: Birmingham International Holdings in receivership; (to 17 October 2016); Trillion Trophy Asia; (from 17 October 2016)
- Manager: Gary Rowett (to 14 December 2016); Gianfranco Zola (14 December 2016 – 17 April 2017); Harry Redknapp (from 18 April 2017)
- Stadium: St Andrew's
- Championship: 19th
- FA Cup: Third round; (eliminated by Newcastle United)
- EFL Cup: First round; (eliminated by Oxford United)
- Top goalscorer: League: Lukas Jutkiewicz (11); All: Lukas Jutkiewicz (12)
- Highest home attendance: 29,656 (vs Aston Villa, 30 October 2016)
- Lowest home attendance: 7,202 (vs Oxford United, EFL Cup 1st round, 9 August 2016)
- Average home league attendance: 18,717
Home colours	Away colours

The 2016–17 season is Birmingham City Football Club's 114th season in the English football league system and sixth consecutive season in the second-tier Championship. It covers the period from 1 July 2016 to 30 June 2017.

With the team lying just outside the play-off positions, and two days after three new directors had joined the board, manager Gary Rowett and his backroom staff were sacked on 14 December 2016. Later that day, former West Ham United and Watford manager Gianfranco Zola was announced as Rowett's successor. After four months, during which the team won just twice and dropped to 20th place, three points outside the relegation zone with three matches remaining, Zola resigned, to be replaced by Harry Redknapp, initially to the end of the season. Needing to win their final match if Blackburn Rovers and Nottingham Forest both won their final fixture – which they did – Birmingham won 1–0 away to Bristol City to avoid relegation and finish in 19th place. As with all Football League clubs, the first team also competed in the FA Cup and EFL Cup. They were eliminated in the third round of the former by Newcastle United after a replay and in the first round of the latter by Oxford United.

Thirty-two players made at least one appearance in first-team competition, of whom four were loan signings; there were fourteen different goalscorers. Defenders Jonathan Grounds and Ryan Shotton appeared in 45 of the club's 49 fixtures over the season, and Lukas Jutkiewicz was top scorer with 12 goals, of which 11 were scored in league competition. Player of the season David Davis received 13 yellow cards and was sent off once, a record which placed him at the top of the Championship ill-discipline table. The average league attendance, of 18,717, was some 6% up on 2015–16.

== Background and pre-season ==
Under the management of Gary Rowett, Birmingham City spent most of the 2015–16 Football League Championship season in or around the play-off positions, but they won just once in the last 12 matches of the campaign, and finished in the lowest position they had occupied all season: tenth. With 16 wins and 15 draws, their finishing position and record was identical to that of 2014–15, albeit with 15 fewer goals conceded.

First-team players released at the end of the 2015–16 season included Mark Duffy, Neal Eardley, David Edgar, Lee Novak, Wes Thomas. and the youth product Mitch Hancox, who had been with the club for fourteen years. Free-transfer signings for 2016–17 included previous loanee Robert Tesche from Nottingham Forest and young Liverpool defender Daniel Cleary. Undisclosed fees were paid for Dundee's attacking player Greg Stewart, young forward Che Adams from Sheffield United, and Derby County defender Ryan Shotton, who had been on loan at Birmingham in 2015–16. The terms of Huddersfield Town striker James Vaughan's loan agreement required its conversion to a permanent contract, but he had not established himself as a first-team player and was allowed to leave. Birmingham made two loan signings, both for the first half of the season: Burnley striker Lukas Jutkiewicz and AFC Bournemouth left back Rhoys Wiggins. Attacking midfielder Andrew Shinnie and striker Nicolai Brock-Madsen left on season-long loans, and young midfielders Koby Arthur and Charlee Adams and striker Alex Jones went out on loan until January.

The home kit is all blue, apart from white trim on the sleeves and three white stripes down the sides and round the sock tops. The away kit is all red, apart from white trim at the neck and under the sleeve and three white stripes on the shoulders, shorts and sock tops. The kits, supplied by Adidas in the first season of a four-year deal, carry the logo of online bookmaker 888sport, the club's principal sponsor.

After a training camp in Spain, Birmingham City's pre-season programme continued with friendly matches away to Midlands teams Solihull Moors, Forest Green Rovers, Shrewsbury Town, Walsall, Port Vale and Kidderminster Harriers, and Scottish Cup-holders Hibernian. Their only home friendly was against Dutch Eredivisie club Roda JC.

Pre-season match details
Date	Opponents	Venue	Result	Score F–A	Scorers	Attendance	Refs
12 July 2016	Solihull Moors	A	W	3–1	Donaldson 17', 34', Fabbrini 28'		
16 July 2016	Forest Green Rovers	A	W	3–0	Morrison 11', Storer 81', Fabbrini 89'	1,382	
19 July 2016	Shrewsbury Town	A	L	0–1		1,020	
19 July 2016	Walsall	A	D	1–1	Caddis 80'	3,301	
24 July 2016	Hibernian	A	L	0–1		5,904	
27 July 2016	Port Vale	A	W	2–0	Storer 73', Caddis 84' pen.	1,603	
30 July 2016	Roda JC	H	D	0–0		4,218	
2 August 2016	Kidderminster Harriers	A	W	4–0	Storer 3', 67', Shinnie 9', Vaughan 33'	1,137	

== EFL Championship ==
=== August–September ===
Birmingham's opening fixture, on a sunny afternoon at home to Cardiff City, was preceded by a minute's applause in memory of former player Alex Govan, who died during the close season. With all senior players available for selection, the team lined up with Tomasz Kuszczak in goal, Jonathan Spector and Jonathan Grounds at full back, Michael Morrison (captain) and Ryan Shotton at centre back, David Davis alongside Stephen Gleeson in defensive midfield, Jacques Maghoma and David Cotterill as wide midfielders, and Diego Fabbrini in support of lone striker Clayton Donaldson. The Press Association reported "no discernible improvement" in home form that had "cost them dearly last season", as Kuszczak made several saves to keep Cardiff at bay. Young substitutes Reece Brown and the 18-year-old Jack Storer, who made his Birmingham debut, combined to create a chance that Storer should have taken – manager Gary Rowett claimed it was the first he had missed since the start of pre-season – and the match finished goalless. After a midweek exit from the EFL Cup, Birmingham faced Leeds United at Elland Road with Maikel Kieftenbeld replacing Fabbrini in a more defensive lineup. Kuszczak's error, allowing Hadi Sacko's weak shot to creep underneath him, equalised Maghoma's early goal, but after Leeds' defence failed to clear Grounds' cross, Morrison gave Birmingham a 2–1 win, their first in eight Championship matches. When Donaldson's 44th-minute penalty away to Wigan Athletic was saved, Davis was first to the rebound to give his side a lead – although television replays supported the home team's accusation of encroachment – but Craig Davies equalised in the last minute.

Che Adams scored 24 minutes into his debut, at home to Wolverhampton Wanderers, but three second-half goals gave the visitors the points. Just 7 minutes after coming on as a substitute, Storer was sent off for headbutting an opponent; while leaving the field, he kicked the advertising hoardings, suffering a foot injury that kept him out for longer than the three-match ban. Davis received his fourth yellow card in as many matches. August ended at home to Norwich City. Rowett strengthened the midfield by bringing in Kieftenbeld and Robert Tesche – making his first league start since signing permanently – in place of Cotterill and the injured Gleeson, and moving Davis to the right. The latter headed the first goal from Maghoma's cross, and after the break Donaldson won and this time converted a penalty for his first goal of the season before taking advantage of a defensive error to complete a 3–0 win.

September began with a 1–0 win at Fulham that left Birmingham fourth in the table. Donaldson missed a first-half penalty awarded for a foul on Adams, then ignored Rowett's instructions that Maghoma should take any further penalty and scored the one awarded for another foul on Adams after 49 minutes. After Kuszczak was injured while warming up before the match away to Reading, Adam Legzdins kept a clean sheet as Birmingham played out what the PA Sport reporter dubbed a "gritty" goalless draw. They relied on the "overworked" Legzdins to keep Sheffield Wednesday at bay until Gary Hooper scored for the visitors after 76 minutes, but the off-form Donaldson won and converted a penalty before substitute Jutkiewicz looped a header over the goalkeeper in stoppage time – his first goal since he put Bolton Wanderers 2–0 up in the final match of the 2013–14 season, in which Birmingham were seconds away from relegation to League One – to complete an unlikely victory. Two draws – away to Queens Park Rangers, a "combative" match likened by Rowett to a UFC bout, and at home to Preston North End, in which Birmingham twice came from behind – took them into October still unbeaten away from home and still in the play-off positions.

=== October–December ===
After Legzdins's "flying save" from Marvin Emnes stopped Birmingham falling behind to Blackburn Rovers, they finally took a chance when substitute Fabbrini fed Cotterill whose cross was "rammed ... into the roof of the net" by Gleeson. Away to Nottingham Forest, Legzdins kept his place in goal despite Kuszczak's return to fitness, and an injury to Spector prompted Rowett to break the Morrison–Shotton defensive pairing, moving the latter to right back and bringing Robinson into the centre. The Birmingham Mail commented that "their defensive reshuffle [had] spread instability throughout the side" as the seven-match unbeaten run came to an end in a 3–1 defeat. In the first match following the club's takeover by Trillion Trophy Asia, they beat a defensively poor Rotherham United 4–2, but away to newly promoted Burton Albion, the hosts showed "more energy and drive" and, according to Rowett, "thoroughly deserved" to win the first competitive meeting between the clubs. Kuszczak returned to the side for the Second City derby against Aston Villa, who had recently appointed former Birmingham captain and manager Steve Bruce as their manager. Despite Birmingham's domination of possession, it was Villa who took a first-half lead; Birmingham's shooting was wasteful, with Donaldson particularly profligate. Davis equalised after 71 minutes with a driven shot from the edge of the penalty area. After a strong performance on his first start, loanee left back Rhoys Wiggins' season was ended by a knee injury sustained in an accidental collision in stoppage time.

Birmingham recovered from a weak first half and 1–0 down after an hour to draw away to third-placed Huddersfield Town when Grounds kept the ball in play to set up a chance for Jutkiewicz to score with a well-placed header. A win over Bristol City courtesy of Adams' late goal put Birmingham back into the play-off positions. Spector's stoppage-time dismissal meant a Football League debut for the 20-year-old Josh Dacres-Cogley away to Brentford, where the visitors rode their luck. Donaldson's penalty, Shotton's back-post touch, a fine performance from Kuszczak and a late disallowed goal ensured a 2–1 win, which took them into December fourth in the table.

A poor performance compounded by Davis's dismissal for a second booking brought a 3–0 defeat at home to Barnsley. In the next match, Birmingham visited Newcastle United – the team who began the season as the hottest favourites ever for the Championship title. Rowett did not replace the suspended Davis with a similarly combative player, preferring to include more creative players, two of whom were substituted at half time with the score 2–0. Newcastle's superiority continued through the second half, Dwight Gayle completed a hat-trick, and the match ended 4–0; Birmingham's teenage debutant Corey O'Keeffe missed a good chance to mark his first appearance with a goal. Rowett was disappointed with his team, saying that "we didn't play enough balls or play with enough quality when we did win the ball. We were too passive at times." In front of the season's lowest league attendance, of 15,212, Birmingham beat Ipswich Town by two goals to one. Donaldson scored the first, from the penalty spot, but was stretchered off soon afterwards, and Morrison doubled the lead, but Ipswich pulled one back after 69 minutes and had a late equaliser disallowed.

=== Change of management ===
The win against Ipswich left Birmingham in seventh position, three points off third place, and outside the play-off positions only on goal difference. The following morning, two days after three new directors had joined the board, Rowett and his backroom staff were sacked.

Later that day, the former West Ham United and Watford manager Gianfranco Zola was appointed on a two-and-a-half-year contract. His staff included Pierluigi Casiraghi and Gabriele Cioffi as first-team coaches and Kevin Hitchcock as goalkeeping coach. The club's chief executive, Panos Pavlakis, said, "His pedigree, philosophy and ambition fits with what we would like to achieve as we move in a new direction. Gianfranco has a wealth of top-level experience as both manager and player and we are extremely excited about his appointment." Zola confirmed that he had been approached about the post "some time ago". The Birmingham Mail reported that the players were "fuming" when Rowett told them he had been sacked; Zola began his tenure with a meeting with five senior players – Jutkiewicz, Morrison, Robinson, Shotton and Spector. He outlined his intention to make the team play more attacking, adventurous football, although he accepted it would be a gradual process: "I would be crazy to change a team that is doing so well and to try to implement so many things straight away."

=== December–January ===
The only change in the starting eleven for Zola's first match, at home to top-of-the-table Brighton & Hove Albion, saw Stewart replace the injured Donaldson. Kieftenbeld hit the post inside the first minute, Jutkiewicz gave Birmingham the lead early in the second half with an arcing header from Davis's cross, and the same player was denied by a "smart save". Zola brought on Dacres-Cogley for Stewart, to strengthen the right side of defence and counteract Brighton's increasingly influential substitute, Solly March, and then replaced Gleeson, who had looked comfortable in the sitting midfielder role, with Tesche. March promptly beat Tesche and crossed for Anthony Knockaert to equalise. In the fourth minute of stoppage time, Robinson – on for Spector – fouled March to concede a free kick that led to a corner, from which Glenn Murray was left unmarked to head home the winner. According to Derby County manager Steve McClaren, "Birmingham were waiting to be beaten"; they were beaten, but only via what Zola described as a soft penalty. December ended with Birmingham's first point since the change of management. Away to Barnsley, they came back from 2–0 down to draw the match, with goals from Jutkiewicz (penalty) and Maghoma, to finish the year in eleventh position.

In January, Birmingham collected two points from five Championship matches in which they scored just twice. Jutkiewicz gave his side a lead at home to Brentford, but in the second half, the visitors capitalised on mistakes to score three times as well as miss a penalty. In a match of few chances, Nottingham Forest broke their five-match losing streak in a match of few chances in which Birmingham's highlight was the return on loan of midfielder Craig Gardner, who had left the club after their relegation from the Premier League in 2011. Early in the visit to 23rd-placed Blackburn Rovers, Cotterill was fouled for a penalty converted by Jutkiewicz. Danny Graham equalised with the last kick of the first half. Kuszczak had earlier suffered a blow to the head and was substituted at half time with blurred vision. Although the second half was open, the score remained 1–1, and Birmingham gave a late debut to new signing, Turkish international winger Kerim Frei. Zola gave a first start to Frei and a debut to former Middlesbrough right-back Emilio Nsue away to Norwich City, but although he thought the team had been more creative, they lost 2–0.

Without Cotterill for the visit of Reading on transfer deadline day – he had joined divisional rivals Bristol City on loan, having been given 24 hours notice to find another club because he did not fit into the shape that Zola wanted his team to take up – and with Dacres-Cogley and Robinson replacing Nsue and Morrison on fitness grounds, Birmingham lost Shotton to injury at half time. Morrison came on, and helped his team produce what the Birmingham Mail reported as a determined performance that deserved at least a draw. The visitors scored the only goal after 71 minutes, extending the winless run under Zola's management to eight Championship matches.

=== February–April ===
Birmingham won their first match under Zola's management on 4 February at home to Fulham. With both Morrison and Shotton unavailable through injury, Robinson and Grounds played at centre-back, with Nsue and Keita at full-back and Jerome Sinclair making his debut alongside Jutkiewicz. After heading against the crossbar in the first half, Jutkewicz scored the only goal of the match – his tenth of the season – a few minutes after Fulham's Ryan Fredericks was sent off for a foul on Gardner. Normal service was resumed with a 3–0 defeat at Sheffield Wednesday, in which Birmingham hit the woodwork three times. Without Davis, who began a two-match suspension for ten yellow cards, Birmingham recalled Adams to the starting eleven for the visit to Preston North End and gave Krystian Bielik his debut alongside Grounds at centre-back. Gardner captained the team, and was sent off for a bad foul, just after Preston had taken a 2–1 lead. Zola said he was "fed up" of talking about luck: "The reason we keep losing games like this is not because we are unlucky, at the moment we are very poor, simple as that."

With Shotton fit again, Birmingham played a 3–5–2 formation for the visit of Queens Park Rangers; with Jutkiewicz injured, Adams and Sinclair played up front. Five minutes after Nsue "missed a sitter", QPR took the lead. After half an hour, left wing-back Keita went off with concussion; at half-time, winger Frei came on for defender Dacres-Cogley, and Jack Storer made a late appearance in a deeper, midfield role. By the time of Nsue's stoppage-time goal, QPR had four. Davis and Gardner returned at Wolverhampton Wanderers, with Adams as lone striker. Kieftenbeld's sharp reaction to Wolves' goalkeeper dropping the ball at his feet gave Birmingham a lead, which was doubled by Davis with a curled shot from the edge of the penalty area. After Robinson was sent off for striking an opponent – the dismissal was rescinded on appeal – Wolves reduced the deficit but Birmingham held on for a win that left them in 13th position.

Fourth-placed Leeds United's manager Garry Monk claimed to have not enjoyed the first hour of his team's visit to Birmingham, but Chris Wood scored twice to contribute to a 3–1 defeat for his former employers. Zola claimed that despite the mistakes, it was his team's best performance of the season. Four days later, they gave what BBC Sport's reporter dubbed "as poor a first-half display as they have produced all season" at home to 23rd-placed Wigan Athletic. Another former Birmingham loanee, Dan Burn, scored the only goal of the match. Away to Cardiff City, Jutkiewicz scored an 89th-minute equaliser when the ball rebounded off his shin after his header was saved; despite the point, Birmingham dropped to 17th place, six points above the relegation zone. The last fixture in March saw the return of Donaldson after three months out with injury. The goalless draw took Newcastle United top of the table and left Birmingham 18th and a point closer to relegation.

Away to Ipswich Town, Grounds gave Birmingham a lead just after half-time, but Gavin Ward's shot – described by Ipswich manager Mick McCarthy as "a wonder-strike, or a lucky cross" – beat Kuszczak to share the points. After Glenn Murray's 20th goal of the season gave Brighton & Hove Albion a 2nd-minute lead, Birmingham had the better of the first half, but they conceded again just after half-time and the match finished 3–1. The consolation goal, after 85 minutes, came when Frei ran through Brighton's defence and slid the ball through to Maghoma in the penalty area; he backheeled it to Adams whose fierce shot was deflected past the goalkeeper. The next fixture saw the return to Gary Rowett to St Andrew's, as manager of Derby County. Again, Birmingham conceded early; a shot rebounded off the post onto Kuszczak's back and into the goal. Jutkiewicz appeared to have equalised but the attempt was disallowed: neither manager saw a foul. After 69 minutes, Adams did equalise, and it seemed as though Birmingham would hold on for the draw when, in stoppage time, Derby's goalkeeper hit a quick goal kick down the middle to Tom Ince who lobbed the advancing Kuszczak.

Birmingham began the Easter weekend away to Rotherham United, whose relegation was already confirmed and who had lost their previous ten matches, without Donaldson, who had injured a knee in training. Zola said before the match that they needed to win, but the performance did not reflect that need. After 73 minutes, Frei's first goal for Birmingham, a swerving 25-yard free kick, gave his team the lead, but that lead lasted only 12 minutes, and Rotherham missed a clear chance to win the match in stoppage time when Jerry Yates "embarrassingly blazed over". At the end of the match, the Birmingham crowd called for Zola to go – he said that he had no intention of leaving, and as long as the fans turned on him but supported the players, there was no problem – and during the post-match warm-down, arguments broke out among the players and Emilio Nsue had to be restrained by teammates. At home to Burton Albion on Easter Monday, Birmingham lost 2–0.

=== Second change of management ===
Zola resigned after the match. He said: "I sacked myself. I decided to give in my resignation. I am sorry because I came to Birmingham with huge expectations. Unfortunately the results have not been good and I take full responsibility. It is not that I like quitting, but Birmingham deserves better. If I feel I cannot help the players, why stay? If I cannot help the team, it is better I leave and let someone else do that." The team had won just twice in 24 attempts under his management, and had fallen from three points off third place when he took control to three points outside the relegation zone with three matches remaining. According to BBC Radio WM's Richard Wilford, "The Easter performances against Rotherham and Burton were limp, listless and damning. Birmingham's flirtation with relegation is very real indeed."

Sixteen hours later, the club announced the appointment of the 70-year-old Harry Redknapp, who was Premier League Manager of the Year in 2009–10 with Tottenham Hotspur. He would work unpaid until the end of the season, and would receive a bonus if the team avoided relegation. Any interest in staying in post for 2017–18 would depend on their staying up. He brought in experienced manager Steve Cotterill and coach Paul Groves as first-team coaches, and retained Kevin Hitchcock as goalkeeping coach.

=== The last three matches ===
Redknapp contacted Gary Rowett to discuss the players ahead of his first match in charge, the derby visit to Aston Villa, which was preceded by a minute's applause in honour of Villa and England defender Ugo Ehiogu, who died two days before at the age of 44. A poor but even match in front of a 40,000 crowd was changed after an hour by the introduction of Gabriel Agbonlahor, who scored what proved to be the winning goal – his fifth against Birmingham. While bemoaning the fact that Villa's only shot in the second half had resulted in a goal, Redknapp was pleased with the players' application. Video later emerged that appeared to show Paul Robinson kicking and punching Villa's James Chester just after the goal was scored. After Villa owner Tony Xia alerted the authorities to the incident via Twitter, Robinson was charged by the FA, who did not accept his argument that contact was accidental, and he received a three-match ban.

Michael Morrison's return to fitness after three months out coincided with Robinson's suspension, and he returned to both starting eleven and captaincy for the home fixture against Huddersfield Town. With his team confirmed in the play-off positions, manager David Wagner made ten changes to his starting eleven. After eight minutes, Adams was brought down in the area but Jutkiewicz's penalty was saved. A quarter of an hour later, Adams was sent off for what the referee perceived as a foul; the red card was rescinded on appeal. Four minutes before half-time, Grounds' close-range header put Birmingham ahead, and with fourteen minutes or normal time remaining, a foul on Maghoma conceded a second penalty. Maghoma wanted to take the kick himself, but Redknapp told Gardner to do so – he had never seen Gardner take a penalty, but admired the way he could strike a ball – and the kick was successful. Despite the win, Blackburn Rovers beating Aston Villa meant relegation was still a possibility.

Birmingham went into the last day of the season knowing that a win away to Bristol City guaranteed survival. If they failed to win, they would go down only if both Blackburn and Nottingham Forest won their final matches. Survival was indeed achieved with a 1–0 victory, this result being essential as both Blackburn and Forest won their final matches.

=== Match results ===
Match results: Championship
Date	League position	Opponents	Venue	Result	Score F–A	Scorers	Attendance	Refs
6 August 2016	10th	Cardiff City	H	D	0–0		19,833	
13 August 2016	7th	Leeds United	A	W	2–1	Maghoma 15', Morrison 55'	27,392	
16 August 2016	9th	Wigan Athletic	A	D	1–1	Davis 44'	11,182	
20 August 2016	13th	Wolverhampton Wanderers	H	L	1–3	Che Adams 24'	18,569	
27 August 2016	10th	Norwich City	H	W	3–0	Davis 22', Donaldson 68' pen., 83'	16,295	
10 September 2016	4th	Fulham	A	W	1–0	Donaldson 49' pen.	17,603	
13 September 2016	5th	Reading	A	D	0–0		14,602	
17 September 2016	5th	Sheffield Wednesday	H	W	2–1	Donaldson 81' pen., Jutkiewicz 90+2'	16,786	
24 September 2016	6th	Queens Park Rangers	A	D	1–1	Jutkiewicz 23'	13,693	
27 September 2016	6th	Preston North End	H	D	2–2	Shotton 30', Che Adams 68'	15,779	
1 October 2016	6th	Blackburn Rovers	H	W	1–0	Gleeson 64'	16,781	
14 October 2016	6th	Nottingham Forest	A	L	1–3	Jutkiewicz 71'	19,208	
18 October 2016	5th	Rotherham United	H	W	4–2	Morrison 15', Jutkiewicz 35', Maghoma 43', Cotterill 84' pen.	16,404	
21 October 2016	5th	Burton Albion	A	L	0–2		5,818	
30 October 2016	7th	Aston Villa	H	D	1–1	Davis 71'	29,656	
5 November 2016	7th	Huddersfield Town	A	D	1–1	Jutkiewicz 73'	20,200	
19 November 2016	5th	Bristol City	H	W	1–0	Che Adams 81'	18,586	
26 November 2016	4th	Brentford	A	W	2–1	Donaldson 14' pen., Shotton 63'	10,925	
3 December 2016	5th	Barnsley	H	L	0–3		17,072	
10 December 2016	7th	Newcastle United	A	L	0–4		52,145	
13 December 2016	7th	Ipswich Town	H	W	2–1	Donaldson 41' pen., Morrison 53'	15,212	
17 December 2016	8th	Brighton & Hove Albion	H	L	1–2	Jutkiewicz 52'	17,287	
27 December 2016	11th	Derby County	A	L	0–1		32,616	
31 December 2016	11th	Barnsley	A	D	2–2	Maghoma 33', Jutkiewicz 52' pen.	13,397	
2 January 2017	13th	Brentford	H	L	1–3	Jutkiewicz 23'	18,030	
14 January 2017	12th	Nottingham Forest	H	D	0–0		18,041	
21 January 2017	12th	Blackburn Rovers	A	D	1–1	Jutkiewicz 3' pen.	12,035	
28 January 2017	12th	Norwich City	A	L	0–2		25,678	
31 January 2017	12th	Reading	H	L	0–1		16,672	
4 February 2017	12th	Fulham	H	W	1–0	Jutkiewicz 75'	17,426	
10 February 2017	12th	Sheffield Wednesday	A	L	0–3		24,805	
14 February 2017	14th	Preston North End	A	L	1–2	Che Adams 47'	10,233	
18 February 2017	14th	Queens Park Rangers	H	L	1–4	Nsue 90+3'	20,265	
24 February 2017	13th	Wolverhampton Wanderers	A	W	2–1	Kieftenbeld 27', Davis 32'	27,541	
3 March 2017	14th	Leeds United	H	L	1–3	Gardner 63'	20,321	
7 March 2017	17th	Wigan Athletic	H	L	0–1		15,596	
11 March 2017	17th	Cardiff City	A	D	1–1	Jutkiewicz 89'	20,334	
18 March 2017	18th	Newcastle United	H	D	0–0		20,334	
1 April 2017	18th	Ipswich Town	A	D	1–1	Grounds 48'	16,667	
4 April 2017	18th	Brighton & Hove Albion	A	L	1–3	Che Adams 85'	28,654	
8 April 2017	18th	Derby County	H	L	1–2	Che Adams 68'	19,381	
14 April 2017	19th	Rotherham United	A	D	1–1	Frei 73'	10,160	
17 April 2017	20th	Burton Albion	H	L	0–2		19,794	
23 April 2017	21st	Aston Villa	A	L	0–1		40,884	
29 April 2017	20th	Huddersfield Town	H	W	2–0	Grounds 41', Gardner 76' (pen.)	26,914	
7 May 2017	19th	Bristol City	A	W	1–0	Che Adams 16'	25,404	

=== League table ===
Pos	Team	Pld	W	D	L	GF	GA	GD	Pts
17	Bristol City	46	15	9	22	60	66	−6	54
18	Queens Park Rangers	46	15	8	23	52	66	−14	53
19	Birmingham City	46	13	14	19	45	64	−19	53
20	Burton Albion	46	13	13	20	49	63	−14	52
21	Nottingham Forest	46	14	9	23	62	72	−10	51

Rules for classification: 1) Points; 2) Goal difference; 3) Number of goals scored; 4) Points in head-to-head matches; 5) Goal difference in head-to-head matches; 6) Goals scored in head-to-head matches; 7) Play-off.

=== Results summary ===
Overall								Home						Away					
Pld	W	D	L	GF	GA	GD	Pts	W	D	L	GF	GA	GD	W	D	L	GF	GA	GD
46	13	14	19	45	64	−19	53	8	5	10	25	31	−6	5	9	9	20	33	−13

== FA Cup ==
As with all first- and second-tier teams, Birmingham entered the competition at the third-round (last-64) stage. They were drawn at home to Newcastle United.

FA Cup match details
Round	Date	Opponents	Venue	Result	Score F–A	Scorers	Attendance	Refs
Third round	7 January 2017	Newcastle United	H	D	1–1	Jutkiewicz 42'	13,171	
Third round replay	18 January 2017	Newcastle United	A	L	1–3	Cotterill 72'	34,896	

== EFL Cup ==
In the first round of the League Cup competition, renamed EFL Cup following the rebranding of the Football League as English Football League, Birmingham were drawn at home to Oxford United, newly promoted to League One. They made nine changes from the eleven who started the opening league fixture, only Morrison and Grounds keeping their places. Full-back Josh Dacres-Cogley made his senior debut, and first appearances of the season were made by goalkeeper Adam Legzdins, full-back Paul Caddis – playing in a covering position ahead of Dacres-Cogley – midfielders Robert Tesche and Maikel Kieftenbeld, winger Viv Solomon-Otabor and striker James Vaughan. After a first half which Birmingham dominated, creating numerous chances which they failed to take, the second-half introduction of Maghoma, Donaldson and Gleeson made no difference to the score. Just before the end of extra time, Liam Sercombe won the match for Oxford with a close-range header.

EFL Cup match details
Round	Date	Opponents	Venue	Result	Score F–A	Scorers	Attendance	Refs
First round	9 August 2016	Oxford United	H	L	0–1 a.e.t.		7,202	

== Transfers ==
=== In ===
Date	Player	Club†	Fee	Ref
30 June 2016	Ryan Shotton	Derby County	Undisclosed	
1 July 2016	Robert Tesche	(Nottingham Forest)	Free	
27 July 2016	Daniel Cleary	(Liverpool)	Free	
8 August 2016	Ché Adams	Sheffield United	Undisclosed	
12 August 2016	Greg Stewart	Dundee	Undisclosed	
3 January 2017	Lukas Jutkiewicz	Burnley	£1,000,000	
4 January 2017	Logan Kwiecen	Beaconsfield SYCOB	Undisclosed	
4 January 2017	Olly McCoy	Beaconsfield SYCOB	Undisclosed	
18 January 2017	Emilio Nsue	Middlesbrough	Undisclosed	
19 January 2017	Cheick Keita	Virtus Entella	Undisclosed	
20 January 2017	Kerim Frei	Beşiktaş	€2.25 million	
23 January 2017	Dan Scarr	Stourbridge	Undisclosed	

† Brackets around club names indicate the player's contract with that club had expired before he joined Birmingham.

=== Out ===
Date	Player	Club†	Fee	Ref
24 August 2016	James Vaughan	(Bury)	Mutual consent	
5 January 2017	Alex Jones	Bradford City	Undisclosed	
24 January 2017	Jonathan Spector	(Orlando City)	Mutual consent	
26 January 2017	Paul Caddis	(Bury)	Mutual consent	
30 June 2017	Charlee Adams	(Dagenham & Redbridge)	Released	
30 June 2017	Koby Arthur	(Macclesfield Town)	Released	
30 June 2017	Noe Baba	(Macclesfield Town)	Released	
30 June 2017	Reece Brown	(Forest Green Rovers)	Released	
30 June 2017	Charlie Cooper	(Forest Green Rovers)	Released	
30 June 2017	Logan Kwiecien		Released	
30 June 2017	George O'Neill		Released	
30 June 2017	Josh Tibbetts	(Peterborough United)	Released	

† Brackets round a club denote the player joined that club after his Birmingham City contract expired.

=== Loan in ===
Date	Player	Club	Return	Ref
31 August 2016	Lukas Jutkiewicz	Burnley	2 January 2017	
31 August 2016	Rhoys Wiggins	AFC Bournemouth	2 January 2017	
11 January 2017	Craig Gardner	West Bromwich Albion	End of season	
31 January 2017	Jerome Sinclair	Watford	End of season	
31 January 2017	Krystian Bielik	Arsenal	End of season	

=== Loan out ===
Date	Player	Club	Return	Ref
9 August 2016	Wes Harding	Alfreton Town	9 September 2016	
12 August 2016	Alex Jones	Port Vale	2 January 2017	
17 August 2016	Andrew Shinnie	Hibernian	End of season	
19 August 2016	Koby Arthur	Cheltenham Town	2 January 2017	
19 August 2016	Charlee Adams	Kilmarnock	5 January 2017	
31 August 2016	Nicolai Brock-Madsen	PEC Zwolle	End of season	
26 October 2016	Charlie Cooper	York City	One month	
9 December 2016	Charlie Cooper	Forest Green Rovers	End of season	
1 January 2017	Jack Storer	Yeovil Town	25 January 2017	
23 January 2017	Diego Fabbrini	Spezia	End of season	
27 January 2017	Luke Maxwell	Grimsby Town	End of season	
31 January 2017	Reece Brown	Chesterfield	End of season	
31 January 2017	Viv Solomon-Otabor	Bolton Wanderers	End of season	
31 January 2017	David Cotterill	Bristol City	End of season	

== Appearances and goals ==
Numbers in parentheses denote appearances made as a substitute.
Players marked † left the club during the playing season.
Players with names in italics and marked * were on loan from another club for the whole of their season with Birmingham.
Players listed with no appearances have been in the matchday squad but only as unused substitutes.
Key to positions: GK – Goalkeeper; DF – Defender; MF – Midfielder; FW – Forward

Players' appearances and goals by competition
No.	Pos.	Nat.	Name	League		FA Cup		EFL Cup		Total		Discipline	
No.	Pos.	Nat.	Name	Apps	Goals	Apps	Goals	Apps	Goals	Apps	Goals	A yellow rectangle, denoting the yellow penalty card shown to a player being cautioned	A red rectangle, denoting the red penalty card shown to a player being sent off
1	GK	ENG	Adam Legzdins	8 (2)	0	2	0	1	0	11 (2)	0	1	0
2	DF	EQG	Emilio Nsue	18	1	0	0	0	0	18	1	1	0
3	DF	ENG	Jonathan Grounds	42	2	2	0	1	0	45	2	9	0
4	DF	ENG	Paul Robinson	13 (9)	0	2	0	1	0	16 (9)	0	5	1
5	DF	ENG	Ryan Shotton	43	2	2	0	0	0	45	2	11	0
6	MF	NED	Maikel Kieftenbeld	33 (6)	1	2	0	1	0	36 (6)	1	7	0
7	MF	GER	Robert Tesche	19 (5)	0	1	0	1	0	21 (5)	0	5	0
8	MF	IRL	Stephen Gleeson	25 (4)	1	1	0	0 (1)	0	26 (5)	1	6	0
9	FW	JAM	Clayton Donaldson	16 (7)	6	0	0	0 (1)	0	16 (8)	6	2	0
10	MF	ITA	Diego Fabbrini	2 (5)	0	1 (1)	0	0	0	3 (6)	0	0	0
11	MF	WAL	David Cotterill	19 (6)	1	1	1	0	0	20 (6)	2	3	0
12	DF	WAL	Rhoys Wiggins * †	1 (1)	0	0	0	0	0	1 (1)	0	0	0
12	MF	ENG	Craig Gardner *	19 (1)	2	0	0	0	0	19 (1)	2	3	1
14	FW	ENG	Che Adams	28 (12)	7	2	0	0	0	30 (12)	7	3	1
15	FW	ENG	Lukas Jutkiewicz	31 (7)	11	1 (1)	1	0	0	32 (8)	12	1	0
17	MF	ENG	Viv Solomon-Otabor	0 (3)	0	1	0	1	0	2 (3)	0	0	0
18	MF	ENG	Reece Brown	1 (7)	0	0 (1)	0	0	0	1 (8)	0	1	0
19	MF	COD	Jacques Maghoma	20 (7)	3	0	0	0 (1)	0	20 (8)	3	4	0
20	FW	SCO	Greg Stewart	6 (15)	0	0 (1)	0	0	0	6 (16)	0	1	0
21	FW	ENG	James Vaughan †	0	0	0	0	1	0	1	0	0	0
21	MF	TUR	Kerim Frei	3 (10)	1	0	0	0	0	3 (10)	1	2	0
22	MF	SCO	Andrew Shinnie	0	0	0	0	0	0	0	0	0	0
23	DF	USA	Jonathan Spector †	22	0	1	0	0	0	23	0	1	1
25	DF	ENG	Josh Dacres-Cogley	9 (5)	0	1 (1)	0	1	0	11 (6)	0	2	0
26	MF	ENG	David Davis	40 (1)	4	2	0	0	0	42 (1)	4	14	1
27	GK	ENG	Connal Trueman	0	0	0	0	0	0	0	0	0	0
28	DF	ENG	Michael Morrison	30 (1)	3	0	0	1	0	31 (1)	3	6	0
29	GK	POL	Tomasz Kuszczak	38	0	0	0	0	0	38	0	2	0
30	DF	IRL	Corey O'Keeffe	0 (1)	0	0	0	0	0	0 (1)	0	0	0
31	DF	SCO	Paul Caddis †	0	0	0	0	1	0	1	0	0	0
31	DF	POL	Krystian Bielik *	8 (2)	0	0	0	0	0	8 (2)	0	3	0
33	DF	MLI	Cheick Keita	9 (1)	0	0	0	0	0	9 (1)	0	4	0
38	FW	ENG	Jack Storer	0 (4)	0	0	0	1	0	1 (4)	0	2	1
48	FW	ENG	Jerome Sinclair *	3 (2)	0	0	0	0	0	3 (2)	0	0	0

Players not included in matchday squads
No.	Pos.	Nat.	Name
16	MF	ENG	Charlee Adams
24	MF	GHA	Koby Arthur
44	FW	DEN	Nicolai Brock-Madsen
