= Nick Townsend =

Antiguan footballer (born 1994)

Personal information
- Full name: Nicholas Peter Townsend
- Date of birth: 1 November 1994 (age 32)
- Place of birth: Solihull, England
- Height: 1.81 m (5 ft 11 in)
- Position: Goalkeeper

Team information
- Current team: Eastleigh
- Number: 1

Youth career
- Callowbrook Swifts
- 2003–2013: Birmingham City

Senior career*
| Years | Team | Apps | (Gls) |
| 2013–2015 | Birmingham City | 0 | (0) |
| 2013 | → Oxford City (loan) | 9 | (0) |
| 2014 | → Lincoln City (loan) | 14 | (0) |
| 2014–2015 | → Lincoln City (loan) | 17 | (0) |
| 2015 | → Barnsley (loan) | 0 | (0) |
| 2015–2018 | Barnsley | 16 | (0) |
| 2017 | → Solihull Moors (loan) | 5 | (0) |
| 2018–2025 | Newport County | 169 | (0) |
| 2025– | Eastleigh | 42 | (0) |

International career^{‡}
| 2022– | Antigua and Barbuda | 11 | (0) |
- * Club domestic league appearances and goals as of 19 May 2026 (UTC) ‡ National team caps and goals as of 5 June 2024 (UTC)

Nicholas Peter Townsend (born 1 November 1994) is a professional footballer who plays as a goalkeeper for National League club Eastleigh. Born in England, he plays for the Antigua and Barbuda national team.

Townsend began his career with Birmingham City, but never appeared for their first team. He spent time on loan with Conference North club Oxford City and Lincoln City of the Conference Premier before joining Championship club Barnsley, initially on loan, in 2015. In 2017, he had a brief loan spell with National League club Solihull Moors before being released by Barnsley at the end of the 2017–18 season.

== Early life and career ==
Townsend was born in Solihull, West Midlands, where he attended Alderbrook Secondary School. He and his father had season tickets at Birmingham City, and the seven-year-old Townsend was at the 2002 play-off final at which the club were promoted to the Premier League for the first time. He joined Birmingham City's youth academy as an under-nine, and took up a scholarship in July 2011.

He was given a squad number in January 2013 after previous third-choice goalkeeper David Lucas left the club, and, with the sale of first-choice goalkeeper Jack Butland pending, he was an unused substitute as Colin Doyle started the FA Cup third round defeat against Leeds United. Butland signed for Stoke City, but was loaned back until the end of the season, so Townsend returned to third choice. He spent a spell on loan at Oxford City, for whom he went straight into the starting eleven and played nine Conference North matches and two in the Oxfordshire Senior Cup.

== Professional football ==
At the end of the season, Townsend signed a one-year professional contract with Birmingham City, with the option of a further year. A fractured hand kept him out of the 2013–14 pre-season friendlies, but he was given a squad number and a place on the bench for the League Cup second-round match at Yeovil Town in late August after Darren Randolph sustained a broken nose and gashed hand during the previous match.

=== Lincoln City (loans) ===
After Lincoln City's regular goalkeeper, Paul Farman, was injured in February 2014, Townsend joined the Conference Premier club on a month's youth loan; he was recommended by fellow Birmingham youngster Charlee Adams who was already on loan there. He kept a clean sheet in the home match against Kidderminster Harriers on 15 February, his performance in his second game, a 1–1 draw with Chester, earned him a spot in The Non-League Paper's Team of the Week, and he kept his place for the remaining 12 matches of the season.

Ahead of the 2014–15 season, Birmingham took up their option on Townsend's contract and gave him squad number 30. After a trial in pre-season with Mansfield Town came to nothing, and no other League clubs showed any interest, Townsend reportedly told Birmingham that if he had to play at Conference level again, he would prefer to return to Lincoln City. He signed a season-long loan with that club ahead of their last pre-season fixture and according to manager Gary Simpson was being brought in as first choice. He did indeed go straight into the starting eleven, and kept his place for the first 17 Conference matches of the season. However, Birmingham had sacked manager Lee Clark just before Lincoln's first FA Cup tie of the season fell due, and were not prepared to let Townsend become cup-tied before a new manager was appointed. Lincoln had to recall Farman from loan at Boston United to play in the Cup, and when the Conference programme resumed, Townsend found himself on the bench. By January 2015, he had made no more appearances, so Birmingham recalled him.

=== Return to Birmingham ===
He played regularly for the development squad, and captained the team that won the Birmingham Senior Cup. After long-time backup goalkeeper Colin Doyle was released at the end of the season, Townsend signed a new two-year contract, with the option of a third year, and according to the club website, was expected to take up Doyle's role. When Tomasz Kuszczak and Adam Legzdins joined the club, Townsend again dropped to third choice, and in early August, he signed for League One club Barnsley on a youth loan until 1 November.

=== Barnsley ===
Townsend was on the bench for Barnsley's opening league match of the season, but made his debut three days later in the League Cup visit to Scunthorpe United. The score was 1–1 after 90 minutes and after extra time, so went to a penalty shootout. Although Townsend did not save any of the kicks, his side won the shootout 7–6 after a Scunthorpe miss. He signed a three-year contract with the club for an undisclosed fee on 1 September. Townsend made his Football League debut on 12 September at home to Swindon Town, after Adam Davies was dropped as one of several changes made by manager Lee Johnson. Lack of communication between Townsend and his defender gifted Swindon the lead via an own goal, but both made up for their errors later in the game as Barnsley won 4–1. According to Barnsley News and Sport, "Townsend was erratic in his judgement in leaving his line on occasions, as witnessed by the confusion over the own goal, but made three good saves". He kept his place until the end of October, but that was the last he played in the season.

In need of first-team football, Townsend joined National League club Solihull Moors in October 2017 on an initial one-month loan. He made five appearances before returning to his parent club. In February 2018, Davies was dropped after a run of 123 starts and Townsend played eight Championship matches before Davies resumed his place. Townsend was released at the end of the season.

=== Newport County ===
On 4 August 2018, Townsend joined League Two side Newport County, signing a two-year contract. He made his debut for Newport on 14 August 2018 in a 4–1 win against Cambridge United in the EFL Cup first round. In April 2021 Townsend signed a two-year contract extension with Newport until the end of the 2022–23 season. Townsend was an unused substitute for Newport in the League Two playoff final at Wembley Stadium on 31 May 2021 which Newport lost to Morecambe, 1–0 after a 107th-minute penalty. In June 2023 Townsend signed a contract extension for a further two years. He was selected as Newport County Player of the Year for the 2023–24 season and the 2024-25 season.

On 9 June 2025, the club announced he would leave when his contract expired.

=== Eastleigh ===
On 12 June 2025 Townsend signed for National League club Eastleigh.

== International career ==
Born in England, Townsend is of Antiguan descent through a grandfather. On 3 June 2022, he made his international debut for Antigua and Barbuda, playing the full match in the 1–0 win against Barbados in the 2022–23 CONCACAF Nations League.

== Career statistics ==
As of 25 April 2026

Appearances and goals by club, season and competition
| Club | Season | League | | | FA Cup | | League Cup | | Other | | Total | |
| Club | Season | Division | Apps | Goals | Apps | Goals | Apps | Goals | Apps | Goals | Apps | Goals |
|---|---|---|---|---|---|---|---|---|---|---|---|---|
| Birmingham City | 2012–13 | Championship | 0 | 0 | 0 | 0 | 0 | 0 | — | | 0 | 0 |
| Birmingham City | 2013–14 | Championship | 0 | 0 | 0 | 0 | 0 | 0 | — | | 0 | 0 |
| Birmingham City | 2014–15 | Championship | 0 | 0 | 0 | 0 | 0 | 0 | — | | 0 | 0 |
| Birmingham City | 2015–16 | Championship | 0 | 0 | 0 | 0 | 0 | 0 | — | | 0 | 0 |
| Birmingham City | Total | | 0 | 0 | 0 | 0 | 0 | 0 | — | | 0 | 0 |
| Oxford City (loan) | 2012–13 | Conference North | 9 | 0 | — | | — | | 2 (Note: Appearances in Oxfordshire Senior Cup) | 0 | 11 | 0 |
| Lincoln City (loan) | 2013–14 | Conference Premier | 14 | 0 | — | | — | | — | | 14 | 0 |
| Lincoln City (loan) | 2014–15 | Conference Premier | 17 | 0 | — | | — | | 0 | 0 | 17 | 0 |
| Lincoln City (loan) | Total | | 31 | 0 | — | | — | | 2 | 0 | 31 | 0 |
| Barnsley | 2015–16 | League One | 8 | 0 | 0 | 0 | 1 | 0 | 1 (Note: Appearance(s) in Football League/EFL Trophy) | 0 | 10 | 0 |
| Barnsley | 2016–17 | Championship | 0 | 0 | 0 | 0 | 0 | 0 | — | | 0 | 0 |
| Barnsley | 2017–18 | Championship | 8 | 0 | 0 | 0 | 0 | 0 | — | | 8 | 0 |
| Barnsley | Total | | 16 | 0 | 0 | 0 | 1 | 0 | 1 | 0 | 18 | 0 |
| Solihull Moors (loan) | 2017–18 | National League | 5 | 0 | — | | — | | — | | 5 | 0 |
| Newport County | 2018–19 | League Two | 3 | 0 | 1 | 0 | 2 | 0 | 4 | 0 | 10 | 0 |
| Newport County | 2019–20 | League Two | 5 | 0 | 2 | 0 | 2 | 0 | 5 | 0 | 14 | 0 |
| Newport County | 2020–21 | League Two | 38 | 0 | 1 | 0 | 3 | 0 | 0 | 0 | 42 | 0 |
| Newport County | 2021–22 | League Two | 19 | 0 | 0 | 0 | 2 | 0 | 3 | 0 | 24 | 0 |
| Newport County | 2022–23 | League Two | 18 | 0 | 0 | 0 | 1 | 0 | 2 | 0 | 21 | 0 |
| Newport County | 2023–24 | League Two | 43 | 0 | 6 | 0 | 1 | 0 | 2 | 0 | 52 | 0 |
| Newport County | 2024–25 | League Two | 43 | 0 | 1 | 0 | 0 | 0 | 2 | 0 | 48 | 0 |
| Eastleigh | 2025–26 | National League | 42 | 0 | 1 | 0 | — | | 0 | 0 | 43 | 0 |
| Eastleigh | Total | | 216 | 0 | 12 | 0 | 11 | 0 | 18 | 0 | 259 | 0 |
| Career total | | | 263 | 0 | 12 | 0 | 12 | 0 | 21 | 0 | 308 | 0 |

=== International ===
As of match played 5 June 2024

Appearances and goals by national team and year
| National team | Year | Apps | Goals |
|---|---|---|---|
| Antigua and Barbuda | 2022 | 5 | 0 |
| Antigua and Barbuda | 2023 | 4 | 0 |
| Antigua and Barbuda | 2024 | 2 | 0 |
| Total | | 11 | 0 |

== Honours ==
Barnsley

- Football League One play-offs: 2016
- Football League Trophy: 2015–16
