= Reece Brown (footballer, born 1996) =

English footballer (born 1996)

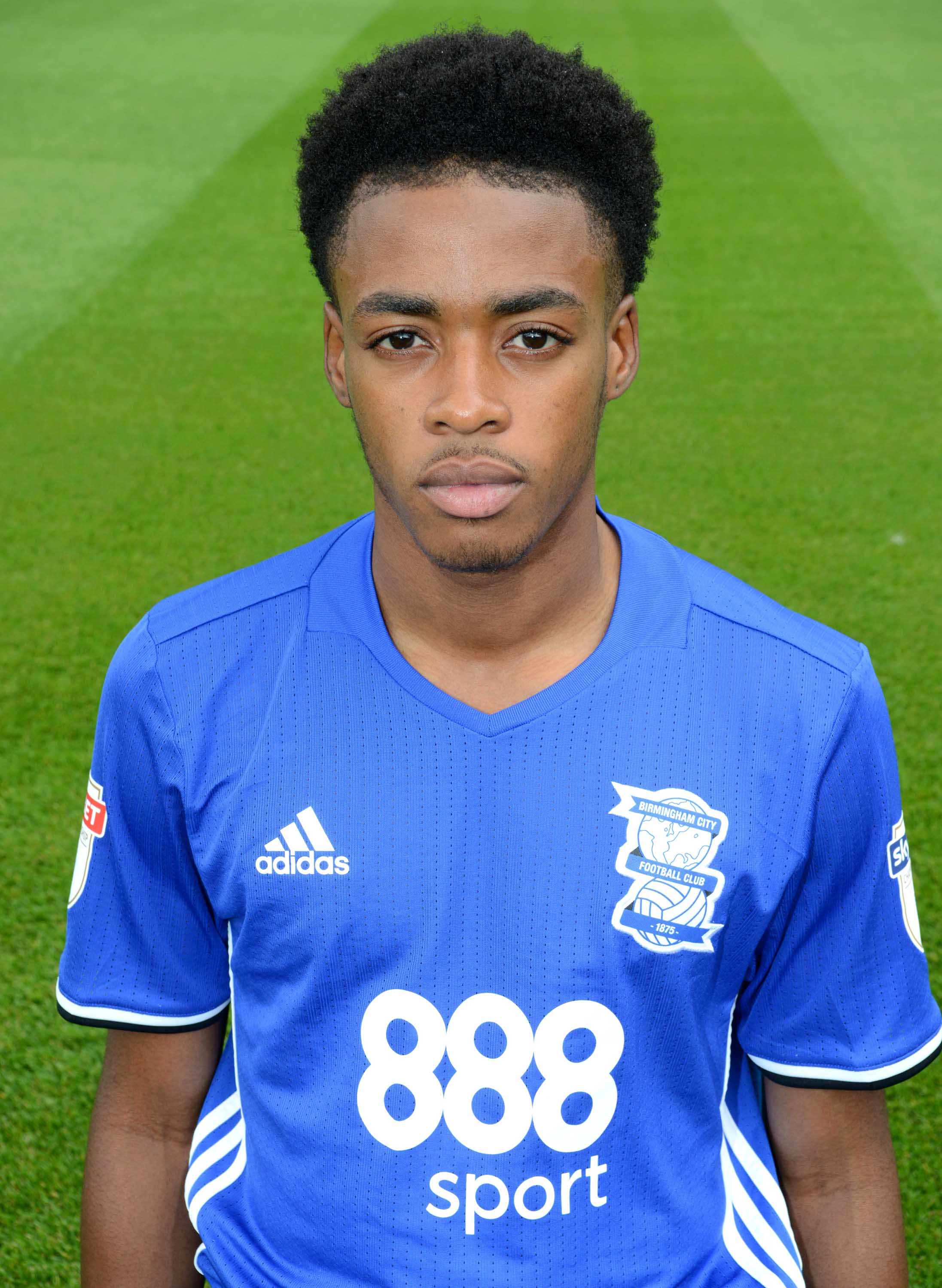
- Brown with Birmingham City in August 2016

Personal information
- Full name: Reece Glen Brown
- Date of birth: 3 March 1996 (age 30)
- Place of birth: Dudley, England
- Height: 5 ft 9 in (1.75 m)
- Position: Central midfielder

Team information
- Current team: Crawley Town
- Number: 10

Youth career
- –: Sedgley White Lions
- 2006–2013: Birmingham City

Senior career*
Years	Team	Apps	(Gls)
2013–2017	Birmingham City	16	(0)
2014	→ Notts County (loan)	3	(0)
2017	→ Chesterfield (loan)	2	(0)
2017–2019	Forest Green Rovers	78	(13)
2019–2022	Huddersfield Town	0	(0)
2020	→ Peterborough United (loan)	10	(0)
2020–2021	→ Peterborough United (loan)	38	(2)
2022	→ Peterborough United (loan)	8	(0)
2022–2024	Forest Green Rovers	26	(4)
2025–2026	Crawley Town	1	(0)

International career
2011–2012	England U16	5	(0)
2012	England U17	5	(1)
2014	England U18	3	(0)
2015	England U20	6	(2)
- * Club domestic league appearances and goals as of 13:06, 3 August 2025 (UTC)

Reece Glen Brown (born 3 March 1996) is an English professional footballer who last played as a central midfielder for EFL League Two club Crawley Town.

Brown made his senior debut for Birmingham City in the Football League in September 2013, and spent time on loan at League One clubs Notts County in September 2014 and Chesterfield in early 2017. He was released by Birmingham in 2017 and joined Forest Green Rovers, where he spent two seasons before signing for Huddersfield Town. He spent the second half of the 2019–20 season on loan at Peterborough United, rejoined the club, also on loan, for the following season, and for a third time in January 2022. Released by Huddersfield in 2022, he rejoined Forest Green Rovers.

He has represented England at under-16, under-17, under-18 and under-20 level.

== Club career ==
=== Early life and club career ===
Brown was born in Dudley, West Midlands, where he attended Jesson's Primary School and then Dormston School in the Sedgley area. As a boy, he played football for Sedgley White Lions, and he joined Birmingham City at the age of ten. After leaving school, he took up a scholarship with the club in July 2012. His goal against West Bromwich Albion's youth team helped Birmingham reach the last 16 of the FA Youth Cup; they lost to Norwich City's youngsters in that round. His fellow first-year scholar Liam Truslove was given a professional contract at the end of the 2012–13 season, but Brown was not. Academy manager Kristjaan Speakman suggested there were parts of his game that needed improvement: "Over the last few years, he has always been regarded as a ball-playing midfielder, very comfortable in possession and able to retain it. What the manager wants from his midfield players is the ability to affect the game out of possession as well." In a July 2013 interview, Brown concurred: he rated his best quality as "what I can do on the ball", and felt he needed to improve his mental strength.

=== First-team football ===
After impressing in training ahead of the new season, Brown produced two goals and set up another for Reece Hales in a development squad pre-season friendly against Solihull Moors. This earned him inclusion in the first-team training group, and he was given a squad number and played the last few minutes of the senior friendly against Hull City. He was named among the substitutes for Birmingham's Championship defeat away to Queens Park Rangers in September, ahead of the likes of Scott Allan and Matt Green, and according to manager Lee Clark, "he was very close to getting on the pitch". He did get on the pitch in the next match, away to Burnley on 17 September, replacing Darren Ambrose in the 51st minute, just after Birmingham went 2–0 down; the match ended 3–0. In a poor team performance, Clark suggested that Brown was "the only player who has probably enhanced his reputation from the night. He came on and showed his ability, showed no nerves and was competitive".

On his first league start, on 18 January 2014, Brown was man of the match, albeit in a losing cause at home to Yeovil Town, and he impressed a week later in the FA Cup defeat to Premier League club Swansea City. Between those two matches, he signed his first professional contract with Birmingham, a two-and-a-half-year deal to run until 2016.

=== Notts County loan ===
After playing in just one of Birmingham's first six games of the 2014–15 season, Brown joined League One club Notts County on a youth loan, initially for a month. He went straight into the starting eleven and played the first 64 minutes of the weekend's match against Bristol City, which Notts lost to a stoppage-time penalty. Two days later, in the Football League Trophy against League Two opponents Mansfield Town, he was used as a playmaker. According to the Nottingham Post, he "revelled in his role as number ten and played with real maturity. Was a real threat whenever he received the ball and came close to scoring with a header", and was named man of the match by both newspaper and club. He made four starts in all before his loan was cut short because of injury.

=== Return to Birmingham ===
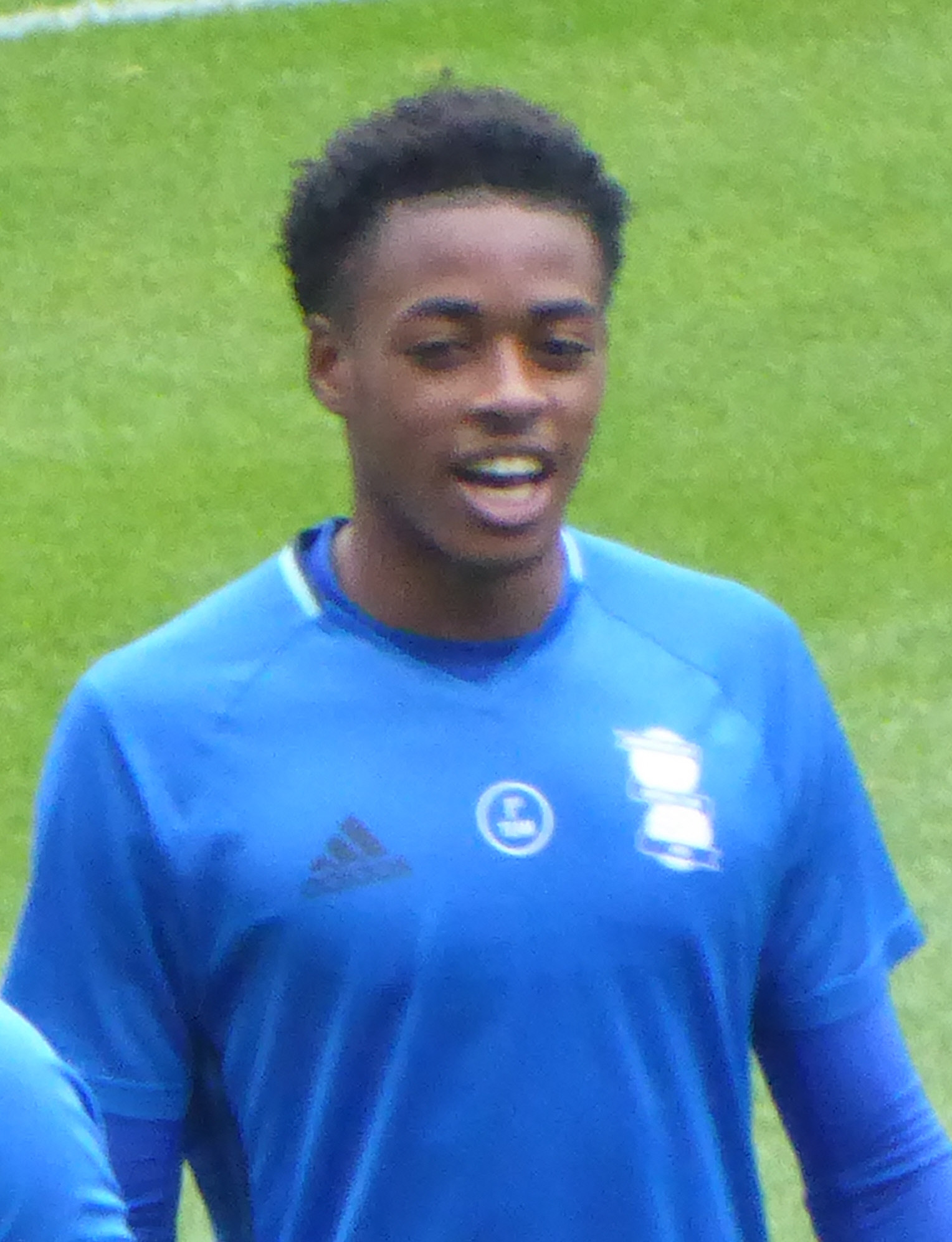
Brown with Birmingham City in August 2016

Gary Rowett, who replaced Clark as manager soon after Brown's return to Birmingham, included the player among the substitutes for his first match in charge, though he remained unused. In February 2015, while praising Brown's technical skill and ability with the ball, Rowett felt he needed to improve off the ball, especially because of the physical nature of Championship football, and to prove himself in training. He selected him once more that season, in the absence of midfielders Stephen Gleeson and Diego Fabbrini and in recognition of his improvement in training, again on the bench for a 4–2 defeat away to AFC Bournemouth in April. By November, Brown had played just six minutes of first-team football, in the League Cup second round, and Rowett had spoken publicly of his lack of professionalism in matters such as punctuality. His application improved, and on 21 November, he made his first appearance in the Championship for more than a year, as a 72nd-minute substitute with Birmingham 1–0 down at home to Charlton Athletic.

Having had no more first-team involvement, Brown joined Premier League club West Ham United on trial in January 2016, and made a promising appearance in a development squad match against Brighton & Hove Albion. He also spent time with AFC Bournemouth, and was reported to have attracted interest from Manchester City. In March, Birmingham City suspended Brown pending the outcome of an internal investigation into his "conduct and levels of professionalism." He returned to the development squad and, according to Rowett, he was working harder. At the end of April, the club offered him another year on his contract, which was due to expire; he signed the extension in June.

Brown was not included in the first-team training camp in Spain, reportedly because Rowett "wanted him to work for his opportunities", but his pre-season performances earned him a place on the bench for the opening fixture of the new Championship season, at home to Cardiff City. He replaced David Cotterill after 71 minutes, and came close to creating a winning goal when he cut the ball back for debutant Jack Storer who narrowly failed to touch it past the goalkeeper; the match finished goalless. In September, Brown made his first start for Birmingham in two and a half years, in a 2–2 draw away to Preston North End. He took his appearance total for the season to eight before Rowett was replaced as manager by Gianfranco Zola; thereafter, his only outing was as a second-half substitute in a losing cause away to Newcastle United in the FA Cup.

=== Chesterfield loan ===
Zola agreed to let Brown go out on loan, at the player's request, because he thought it could "be good for his maturity to go and play in a real difficult situation where he is going to be pushed to improve. Not only as a footballer but his character and temperament as well." Brown joined League One club Chesterfield on 31 January 2017 on loan until 30 April. He made two appearances, both as a second-half substitute in a home defeats to Oldham Athletic and Bury, before manager Gary Caldwell confirmed in mid-March that after "a few incidents", the club felt it was best Brown went back to Birmingham. Birmingham released him when his contract expired at the end of the season.

=== Forest Green Rovers ===
On 1 June 2017, Brown signed for recently promoted League Two club Forest Green Rovers on a one-year contract. He made his debut on the opening day of the 2017–18 season, in the starting eleven for a 2–2 draw at home to Barnet. Brown scored his first senior goal on 19 August, "with a well-struck free-kick from the edge of the box" in first-half stoppage time as Forest Green came back from 2–0 and 3–1 down to beat Yeovil Town 4–3 and record their first win in the Football League.

He played regularly, mainly in the number ten role, finishing the season with 42 appearances in all competitions, and the club took up their option to extend his contract for a further year. In the 2018–19 season he was used in a deeper role with more positional freedom which, according to the Stroud News & Journal's sports reporter, bore witness to his increased willingness and ability to cope with the more physical side of the game. He added goalscoring to his game; in March, he scored five and was involved in all seven of Forest Green's goals, a performance that earned him the EFL League Two Player of the Month award. He finished the season with double figures of both goals and assists from 52 appearances in all competitions, securing himself a place in the PFA League Two Team of the Year and contributing to Forest Green's play-off spot; they lost to Tranmere Rovers in the semi-final, Brown's last appearance with Forest Green.

=== Huddersfield Town ===
Amid interest from Championship clubs including Bristol City and Leeds United, Forest Green offered Brown a new contract at the end of season 2018–19. On 21 June 2019, he signed a three-year contract with Huddersfield Town, newly relegated from the Premier League, for an undisclosed fee.

Having played just once for Huddersfield, in the EFL Cup, Brown signed for League One club Peterborough United on 3 January 2020 on loan until the end of the season. He was a regular in the starting eleven, forming a successful partnership with Jack Taylor in central midfield, until the season was ended early because of the COVID-19 pandemic. On 17 August, Brown rejoined Peterborough on loan until the end of the 2020–21 season.

Brown signed for Peterborough on loan for a third time in January 2022, but made only eight league appearances (five starts) as the team were relegated. He was released by Huddersfield when his contract expired at the end of the season.

=== Forest Green Rovers return ===
Brown rejoined Forest Green Rovers, newly promoted to League One as League Two champions, when his Huddersfield contract expired.

Following the second of back-to-back relegations, Brown was released at the end of the 2023–24 season.

=== Crawley Town ===
On 29 May 2025, having been without a club for the duration of the 2024–25 season, Brown joined recently relegated League Two side Crawley Town on a one-year contract.

Following the conclusion of the 2025/26 season Brown was released at the end of his contract.

== International career ==
Brown made his first appearance for England's under-16 team on 25 November 2011, as a second-half substitute as England beat Scotland under-16s in the Victory Shield. He played in three matches in the 2012 Montaigu Tournament, as England lost on penalties to Russia in the semi-final, but then beat France in the third-place playoff match. He scored on his under-17 debut, against Turkey on 31 August 2012, a 4–1 victory that he chose in 2013 as his most memorable match; according to the Football Association's website, "he broke through the heart of midfield with his electric pace, unleashing a thunderous shot into the bottom left hand corner leaving Akdag with no chance. It was a magnificent goal by the young speedster who produced a fantastic display all evening." He played on the winning side in all three matches of England's qualifying group for the 2013 European Championships.

He was called up for an England under-18s training camp in November 2013, and made his debut at that level on 3 March 2014, as a second-half substitute in a 2–1 defeat to their Croatian counterparts in the first match of a double-header.

Together with Birmingham teammate Demarai Gray, Brown was called up for the England under-20s' first matches of the 2015–16 season, a double-header against the Czech Republic. In the first game, both Gray and Brown scored as England won 5–0; in the second, Brown made a brief substitute appearance in a 1–0 defeat. Both retained their place in the squad for the Mercedes-Benz Elite Cup, a quadrangular tournament played in Germany in October. Although injury forced Gray's withdrawal, Brown started England's first game of the tournament and scored in the eighth minute, the first goal of a 3–1 win against the Netherlands.

== Career statistics ==
As of end of 2023–24 season

Appearances and goals by club, season and competition
Club	Season	League			FA Cup		League Cup		Other		Total	
Club	Season	Division	Apps	Goals	Apps	Goals	Apps	Goals	Apps	Goals	Apps	Goals
Birmingham City	2013–14	Championship	6	0	2	0	0	0	—		8	0
Birmingham City	2014–15	Championship	1	0	0	0	0	0	—		1	0
Birmingham City	2015–16	Championship	1	0	0	0	1	0	—		2	0
Birmingham City	2016–17	Championship	8	0	1	0	0	0	—		9	0
Birmingham City	Total		16	0	3	0	1	0	—		20	0
Notts County (loan)	2014–15	League One	3	0	—		—		1 (Note: Appearance in Football League Trophy)	0	4	0
Chesterfield (loan)	2016–17	League One	2	0	—		—		—		2	0
Forest Green Rovers	2017–18	League Two	33	2	3	0	1	0	5 (Note: Appearance(s) in EFL Trophy)	1	42	3
Forest Green Rovers	2018–19	League Two	45	11	2	0	1	0	4 (Note: Two appearances in EFL Trophy, two in League Two play-offs)	0	52	11
Forest Green Rovers	Total		78	13	5	0	2	0	9	1	94	14
Huddersfield Town	2019–20	Championship	0	0	0	0	1	0	—		1	0
Huddersfield Town	2021–22	Championship	0	0	0	0	0	0	—		0	0
Huddersfield Town	Total		0	0	0	0	1	0	—		1	0
Peterborough United (loan)	2019–20	League One	10	0	1	0	—		—		11	0
Peterborough United (loan)	2020–21	League One	38	2	2	0	1	0	3	0	44	2
Peterborough United (loan)	2021–22	Championship	8	0	2	0	—		—		10	0
Peterborough United (loan)	Total		56	2	5	0	1	0	3	0	65	2
Forest Green Rovers	2022–23	League One	15	3	1	0	2	0	1	0	19	3
Forest Green Rovers	2023–24	League Two	11	1	1	0	0	0	0	0	12	1
Forest Green Rovers	Total		26	4	2	0	2	0	1	0	31	4
Career total			181	19	15	0	7	0	14	1	217	20

== Honours ==
Individual

- EFL League Two Player of the Month: March 2019
- EFL League Two PFA Team of the Year: 2018–19
