= 2015–16 Birmingham City F.C. season =

Birmingham City F.C.
2015–16 season
- Owner: Birmingham International Holdings
- Manager: Gary Rowett
- Stadium: St Andrew's
- Championship: 10th
- FA Cup: Third round
- League Cup: Third round
- Top goalscorer: Clayton Donaldson (11)
- Highest home attendance: 21,380 (vs Middlesbrough, 29 April 2016)
- Lowest home attendance: 9,275 (vs Gillingham, League Cup 2nd round, 25 August 2015)
- Average home league attendance: 17,602
Home colours	Away colours

The 2015–16 season was Birmingham City Football Club's 113th season in the English football league system and fifth consecutive season in the Football League Championship. It covered the period from 1 July 2015 to 30 June 2016. Their Championship record, of 63 points accrued via 16 wins, 15 draws and 15 losses resulting in a tenth-place finish, was exactly the same as in 2014–15. Tenth was the lowest position the team had occupied all season. The average attendance at league matches, of 17,602, was some 9% higher than in 2014–15. As with all clubs in the top two tiers of English football, Birmingham entered the 2015–16 FA Cup in the third round; they lost in that round at home to Premier League club AFC Bournemouth. In the League Cup, they progressed through two rounds before being eliminated by Aston Villa, also of the Premier League, in the third.

Thirty-two players made at least one appearance in first-team competition, of whom six were loan signings and one was registered on a short-term contract; there were eighteen different goalscorers. Team captain Michael Morrison appeared in 49 of the club's 50 fixtures over the season, and played in every minute of the 46 Championship matches. Clayton Donaldson was top goalscorer with 11 goals, all of which were scored in league competition.

== Background and pre-season ==
After narrowly avoiding relegation to League One in 2014, a poor start to the 2014–15 season with only two wins by mid-October brought manager Lee Clark the sack. Under caretaker management, the team lost 8–0 at home to AFC Bournemouth to drop to 23rd place in the table. Burton Albion manager and former Birmingham player Gary Rowett took over, strengthened the defence by bringing in Charlton Athletic's Michael Morrison, initially on loan, and, with the aid of other loan signings including Italian international forward Diego Fabbrini, led them to a 10th-place finish.

First-team players released at the end of the 2014–15 season included Callum Reilly, Nikola Žigić, Matt Green, Olly Lee, Gavin Gunning, youngsters Amari'i Bell and Will Packwood, and long-serving goalkeeper Colin Doyle. First-choice goalkeeper Darren Randolph chose to leave when his contract expired. Free-transfer signings for 2015–16 included winger Jacques Maghoma, previously with Sheffield Wednesday, and two goalkeepers, Adam Legzdins, who started his career with Birmingham but never played for their first team, and former Polish international Tomasz Kuszczak. Undisclosed fees were paid for Groningen's KNVB Cup-winning captain Maikel Kieftenbeld, a Dutch under-21 international defensive midfielder, and Danish forward Nicolai Brock-Madsen; the release clause on Kieftenbeld's contract was widely reported at €250,000, and according to BBC Sport, the fee for Brock-Madsen was "believed to be in the region of £500,000, with possible add-ons taking it up to £1m." Birmingham made one loan signing: attacking midfielder Jon Toral joined from Arsenal for the season. Out-of-contract players who signed new contracts included club captain Paul Robinson, experienced defender Jonathan Spector, and youngsters Nick Townsend, Charlee Adams, Koby Arthur and Viv Solomon-Otabor, the club extended the contracts of defenders Jonathan Grounds and Paul Caddis, top scorer Clayton Donaldson, attacking midfielder Andy Shinnie, and wingers David Cotterill and the in-demand Demarai Gray.

In connection with the club's 140th anniversary in 2015–16, both home and away kits echoed the past. The home kit reproduced the original shirt from 1875, blue with a white sash, with white shorts and blue socks; supporters could pay for their names to be woven into the sash. The away kit reprised the "German flag" kit worn very occasionally in the 1970s, with a yellow right side and sleeve, a broad red central panel, and black left side and sleeve, black shorts and yellow socks with black tops. Both shirts carried intertwined club initials instead of the globe and ball badge. The kits, supplied by Carbrini, bore the logo of sponsors EZE Group, an entertainment and leisure company.

After a training camp in mainland Europe, Birmingham City's pre-season programme continued with friendly matches away to Nuneaton Town, Kidderminster Harriers, Northampton Town, Shrewsbury Town and Burton Albion. They also faced Benfica B at St George's Park. Their only home friendly was against Leicester City.

Pre-season match details
Date	Opponents	Venue	Result	Score F–A	Scorers	Attendance	Refs
14 July 2015	Nuneaton Town	A	W	3–0	Novak 25', Shinnie 70', Davis 73'	1,071	
18 July 2015	Kidderminster Harriers	A	D	1–1	Lowry (Note: Trialist) 82'	2,801	
21 July 2015	Shrewsbury Town (Note: Squad split in two, both games played simultaneously)	A	W	2–0	Thomas 2', Donaldson 15'	1,919	
21 July 2015	Northampton Town	A	D	2–2	Gray 3', Novak 76'	1,675	
25 July 2015	Burton Albion	A	L	0–2		3,393	
27 July 2015	Benfica B	N	L	0–1		n/a	
1 August 2015	Leicester City	H	L	2–3	Cotterill 23', Gray 25'	7,026	

== Football League Championship ==
=== August–September ===
Unlike in recent seasons, there were only three debutants in the opening-day fixture, at home to Reading. With all senior players available for selection, the team lined up in manager Gary Rowett's preferred 4–2–3–1 formation with Kuszczak in goal, Caddis and Grounds at full back, Spector and Morrison at centre back, Kieftenbeld alongside Stephen Gleeson in defensive midfield, Gray and Cotterill as wide midfielders, and Toral in support of lone striker Donaldson. Either side of half-time, Birmingham took a two-goal lead via Cotterill's deflected free kick and Toral's header from Donaldson's cross. Kuszczak's fumble led to the visitors making the score 2–1, but well into stoppage time, substitute David Davis's challenge conceded a penalty. Kuszcazk atoned for his earlier error by parrying the kick, and Reading's Simon Cox failed to convert the rebound.

Away to Burnley, Birmingham twice took the lead, first when Toral ran on to Donaldson's through ball and finished with a first-time shot from the edge of the penalty area, and then via Caddis's penalty, and Cotterill hit the post with a free kick, but with five minutes left, Matt Taylor's powerful free kick earned the hosts a point. Birmingham's penalty caused controversy: there seemed to be little contact by the defender on Donaldson, whose post-match claim that "You get told if you get a slight touch go down" prompted accusations of cheating. The visit to Brentford, scheduled for 18 August, was postponed six days before the scheduled date of 18 August because the hosts needed to re-lay the Griffin Park pitch on an emergency basis. Unusually, they agreed to reimburse supporters for non-refundable travel costs already incurred.

Against Derby County, Gleeson's deflected shot from distance – his first goal for the club – gave Birmingham the lead, which Toral should have increased, but the visitors equalised after an hour, had striker Chris Martin yellow-carded for simulation when he appeared to have been fouled inside the area, and hit the frame of the goal three times, including an excellent save from Kuszczak to turn Andi Weimann's shot onto the post and catch the rebound. After the game, Rowett made comparisons with some of the richer clubs in the division, claiming that although his "team of free transfers and players bought with someone's pocket money" were "more than matching teams", they were "always disappointed coming in we haven't done a little bit more." The second goal of Gleeson's Birmingham career opened the scoring in the club's first League visit to his former club, Milton Keynes Dons: he curled Donaldson's cutback over the goalkeeper into the corner of the net. Later in the game, he was stretchered off with an ankle injury that proved less serious than initially feared. To complete a 2–0 win, substitute Maghoma ran on to Donaldson's through ball and placed it wide of the goalkeeper.

Donaldson – Birmingham's leading scorer in 2014–15 – made up for this season's goal drought with a first-half hat-trick at home to Bristol City. The third goal came from a penalty awarded for a foul on Toral; Bristol City's manager, Steve Cotterill, thought Toral should have been booked for simulation. Regular penalty-taker Caddis allowed Donaldson to take the kick to complete his hat-trick, and a Grounds header completed a 4–2 win. After five league matches with an unchanged starting eleven, Rowett brought in Maghoma for Gray for the visit of Nottingham Forest, who inflicted Birmingham's first defeat of the season and became the first team to prevent them scoring. Forest scored after 54 minutes, after which Gray and league debutants Brock-Madsen and Solomon-Otabor entered the game, but in vain. Rowett was disappointed by the way the team "became a little frantic and a little bit too hurried and desperate on the ball and did not show enough quality."

Neal Eardley, returning to league football after nearly a year out injured, lasted 44 minutes of the visit to Ipswich Town before dislocating his shoulder. On his first start of the season, Shinnie exploited a defensive error to play Cotterill in for the opening goal, which was equalised ten minutes later via a penalty awarded against Spector, a decision that divided opinion. The flatness of their second consecutive home defeat, 2–0 to bottom-of-the-table Rotherham United, was arguably a reaction to the midweek League Cup defeat at Aston Villa. September ended with the rearranged visit to Brentford; since the original date, the club had sold their 2014–15 top scorer Andre Gray, sacked their manager, and appointed former Birmingham captain Lee Carsley in his place. With Shinnie injured, Rowett brought Davis into a three-man defensive midfield, and unexpectedly gave club captain Robinson his first league start in several months. A 2–0 win via Morrison's header from a corner and Gleeson's long ball that Donaldson chipped over the goalkeeper left Birmingham in fifth place, six points behind leaders Brighton & Hove Albion.

=== October–November ===
Birmingham prolonged Leeds United's run without a home win courtesy of a fine performance by Gray, capped by a powerful shot from inside the penalty area for his first goal of the season, two saves by Kuszczak, and a stoppage-time goal from substitute Maghoma. Their own winning run continued at home to Queens Park Rangers, when they came from behind via Robinson's header from Gray's free kick – his second goal for the club in 127 matches – and a second-half penalty converted by Caddis after Donaldson was fouled, and away to bottom club Bolton Wanderers, when Robinson and Gray repeated their partnership for the only goal of the match after 20 minutes. What the BBC's reporter called "some desperate Blues defending", aided by the introduction of Spector as a sweeper to protect the back four, helped Birmingham hold their lead and go second in the table. Rowett retained that formation for the visit to Hull City, but the hosts profited from the additional freedom available to their midfield and won 2–0. On the anniversary of Rowett's first match in charge, a goalless draw away to Wolverhampton Wanderers, Birmingham lost 2–0 at home to the same opponents. He was critical of the team's lack of quality, feeling they "needed to be more inventive and show more composure on the ball."

Birmingham's first home clean sheet of the season combined with a third consecutive failure to score produced a goalless draw at home to 15th-placed Blackburn Rovers, marred by an injury to Cotterill's knee that kept him out of Championship football until February. A free-flowing performance and five goals away followed against a defensively poor Fulham side. In stoppage time, Solomon-Otabor scored his first senior goal: after a run down the left, "a neat turn that left Richard Stearman on his backside was followed by a clinical finish". Donaldson returned from making his international debut for Jamaica with a groin injury that was predicted to keep him out for six weeks. Rowett suggested the damage could have been less serious had Donaldson not played the whole match despite being obviously unfit, but Jamaica coach Winfried Schäfer said the player had insisted on continuing. The inexperienced Brock-Madsen led the line at home to Charlton Athletic. Their manager, Karel Fraeye, "aware that Birmingham struggle at home when they try to be dominant", fielded a well-organised team who scored from what Rowett described as "their only real chance on goal in the whole game." A defeat at Brighton & Hove Albion put the hosts top of the table and left Birmingham in sixth place going into December.

=== December–January ===
Rowett's proactive changes at home to Huddersfield Town – adopting a 4–3–3 formation and a pressing style – were countered by the "worst start you could ever have", as Aston Villa fan and former Birmingham trainee Joe Lolley scored after 33 seconds; for the fourth game running, Birmingham could not do the same, and suffered their third consecutive defeat. With loanee James Vaughan leading the line, Birmingham played out a goalless draw at Middlesbrough in wet and windy conditions; according to the BBC's reporter, Morrison "should have won it when he headed wide late on". A penalty, awarded in first-half stoppage time for handball when the ball appeared to strike the "offender" in the face, was converted by substitute Caddis to secure Birmingham's first league win since 7 November. Defensive errors led to a 3–0 defeat at Sheffield Wednesday, and the last fixture of 2015, at home to Milton Keynes Dons, saw the return to the starting eleven of Donaldson and a 1–0 win courtesy of Maghoma, who "performed not one but two cut-backs, sending six Dons players the wrong way before unleashing a fierce strike into the roof of the net", which took Birmingham into the new year ninth in the table.

Despite the absence of Gray – on the verge of completing a £3.5 million transfer to Premier League club Leicester City – and a first-half injury to Donaldson, Birmingham secured a 2–1 win at home to Brentford via Kieftenbeld's 89th-minute winner. He won the ball in midfield, played it through to Vaughan, and kept running; when Vaughan shot across goal, Kieftenbeld arrived at the far post just in time to slide the ball home for his first goal for the club. A draw at Nottingham Forest preceded a 3–0 win at third-placed Derby County by a Birmingham side described by the Observer's reporter as "tight at the back, and clinical in attack". Kieftenbeld completed the win by "crashing home a brilliant first-time volley from the edge of the area", a feat he repeated in the next match, also 3–0, at home to Ipswich Town. The second goal in that match, when "Kuszczak launched a free kick down the middle, Clayton Donaldson headed on and before the ball hit the ground Toral fired a dipping volley over the goalkeeper from 25 yards", earned its scorer the club's Goal of the Season award. A goalless draw at Bristol City meant Birmingham went through January unbeaten with eleven points from their five matches, which brought the team back into the play-off positions and earned Rowett a nomination for Championship Manager of the Month to add to Kieftenbeld's Player of the Month nomination. They lost out to Hull City's Steve Bruce and Abel Hernández respectively.

=== February–March ===
Donaldson scored his first goal since November in the fifth of thirteen minutes of first-half stoppage time, as a result of injuries to Sheffield Wednesday's Keiren Westwood and Sam Hutchinson, but the arrival of Atdhe Nuhiu as a second-half substitute changed the game and Gary Hooper's two goals in two minutes gave the visitors a win. Rotherham United marked the arrival of Neil Warnock as manager with two sendings-off in a goalless draw at home to Birmingham. A minute's applause in memory of former Birmingham manager Freddie Goodwin, who had led the team to promotion to the First Division in 1971–72 and twice reached the semifinals of the FA Cup, preceded the visit of struggling Bolton Wanderers. Having averted an imminent winding-up order by agreeing a takeover deal, they lost 1–0 at Birmingham to a Donaldson goal set up by Diego Fabbrini, making his first start since signing a permanent contract with the club. February ended with a poor first-half performance that was punished with a 2–0 defeat at Queens Park Rangers.

March began with second-placed Hull City's first loss of 2016 as former Birmingham defender Curtis Davies deflected Toral's shot past his own goalkeeper, but defeat at Blackburn Rovers dropped Birmingham to ninth position. A man-of-the-match performance from Davis, recalled to the starting eleven for the visit to Wolverhampton Wanderers, his former club, was spoilt only when Carl Ikeme made a "great save" to stop his powerful shot giving Birmingham a victory. Davis again nearly won the match at home to Fulham late on with a shot that hit the post, but another draw kept Birmingham in ninth, but now six points off the play-off places albeit with a game in hand.

=== April–May ===
A rearranged schedule because of cup commitments or for television broadcast meant Birmingham had eight fixtures in 28 days in April, including home matches against the top three teams in the division. They began at Charlton Athletic, who were on the verge of relegation. After a delay caused by home fans throwing hundreds of sponge footballs onto the pitch as part of an ongoing protest against the club's ownership, Charlton won via a 94th-minute header from a corner when "everyone is back and two or three players were stood watching while their player heads it in." With the loan window about to close, Birmingham signed Northern Ireland international striker Kyle Lafferty. The move was in both parties'interests: Rowett hoped to improve Birmingham's goalscoring and with it their chances of reaching the play-offs, and the player had hardly appeared for Norwich City, his parent club, and needed match fitness ahead of the upcoming European Championships. Lafferty returned from international duty with a groin injury, and it was rumoured that he would miss the rest of the season, but he was fit to start the home match against third-placed Brighton & Hove Albion on 5 April. He opened the scoring after 16 minutes with a tap-in following a goalkeeping error, but Brighton went on to win 2–1.

Away to Reading, Donaldson headed home after two minutes for his first goal in six weeks, and Cotterill's free kick was parried into the path of Ryan Shotton to secure the win with his first goal for the club. Donaldson scored again three days later, but as a consolation with Birmingham already 2–0 down at home to Leeds United, the defeat left them nine points outside the play-off places. At home to second-placed Burnley, Rowett thought Birmingham were the better team. They equalised though Maghoma's header after Toral's shot was parried, and Grounds headed against the crossbar, but towards the end of the game Championship Player of the Year-elect Andre Gray was left unmarked and touched home a cross. It proved to be Toral's last appearance. He was sent off for a second yellow card in stoppage time, for a foul on former Birmingham loanee Lloyd Dyer, and then injured a hamstring in training that was to keep him out for the last few weeks of the season. He had scored eight goals – second behind Donaldson over the season – and provided three assists. After Donaldson's third and fourth goals since Lafferty's arrival gave Birmingham the lead at home to Preston North End, the visitors scored twice towards the end of the game to ensure that the play-offs were mathematically out of reach. According to Rowett, "the last 15 minutes was one of the weakest I've seen in a game", and he vowed to "make sure that I will not have players in the team who are happy with that kind of performance." Despite Huddersfield Town's statistical dominance, with 65% possession, 18 shots to 5 and 15 corners to 2, Birmingham again "squandered an advantage" given them by Cotterill's free kick to concede a late equaliser and come close to losing the match.

Despite being rescheduled to a Friday night for live television, Birmingham's last home match of the season drew a season-high attendance of 21,380 – boosted by nearly 5,000 visiting supporters and encouraged by a newly formed "singing section" in the Tilton Road end of the ground – who saw an exciting 2–2 draw with Middlesbrough. Gleeson's powerful shot from distance opened the scoring after half an hour, but a few minutes later, Legzdins – in the team because Kuszczak had had surgery on his broken nose – "fumbled the ball as if it was a bar of soap" and Jordan Rhodes tapped in. In the second half, Albert Adomah gave the visitors the lead, Davis's well-placed shot from the edge of the penalty area – his first goal of the season – tied the scores, and a minute later, a Middlesbrough "winner" was disallowed for offside, apparently wrongly. Both goalkeepers made fine saves and both sides had other chances, but the draw was enough to take Middlesbrough top of the table by one point, although Burnley and Brighton both had a game in hand.

The season ended at Cardiff City. With Rowett prioritising players who would be at Birmingham in 2016–17, young midfielder Charlee Adams made his first start and the only loanee in the matchday squad was Shotton, who lost his starting place to Robinson. Morrison, making his 400th league appearance, completed the league season ever-present. Cotterill scored first, from distance, and Birmingham seemed comfortable until Anthony Pilkington took advantage of Grounds' failure to clear a cross. Both Fabbrini and Vaughan hit the post, and Craig Noone and Pilkington made goalline clearances from Cotterill's free kick and Vaughan's late header respectively. The match was drawn, and results elsewhere meant Birmingham finished tenth, with 16 wins and 15 draws, just as they had done in 2014–15. They had won just once in the last 12 matches of the campaign, and tenth was the lowest position they had occupied all season.

=== Match results ===
Match results: Championship
Date	League position	Opponents	Venue	Result	Score F–A	Scorers	Attendance	Refs
8 August 2015	5th	Reading	H	W	2–1	Cotterill 40', Toral 47'	19,171	
15 August 2015	5th	Burnley	A	D	2–2	Toral 10', Caddis 63' pen.	12,430	
21 August 2015	7th	Derby County	H	D	1–1	Gleeson 45'	18,134	
29 August 2015	7th	Milton Keynes Dons	A	W	2–0	Gleeson 57', Maghoma 79'	14,626	
12 September 2015	4th	Bristol City	H	W	4–2	Donaldson 10', 20', 41' pen., Grounds 77'	18,819	
15 September 2015	7th	Nottingham Forest	H	L	0–1		16,604	
18 September 2015	6th	Ipswich Town	A	D	1–1	Cotterill 22'	18,973	
26 September 2015	9th	Rotherham United	H	L	0–2		17,307	
29 September 2015	5th	Brentford	A	W	2–0	Morrison 71', Donaldson 90+4'	9,528	
3 October 2015	4th	Leeds United	A	W	2–0	Gray 31', Maghoma 90+1'	24,601	
17 October 2015	4th	Queens Park Rangers	H	W	2–1	Robinson 24', Caddis 63' pen.	19,161	
20 October 2015	2nd	Bolton Wanderers	A	W	1–0	Robinson 20'	13,703	
24 October 2015	6th	Hull City	A	L	0–2		17,436	
31 October 2015	6th	Wolverhampton Wanderers	H	L	0–2		18,946	
3 November 2015	6th	Blackburn Rovers	H	D	0–0		15,701	
7 November 2015	6th	Fulham	A	W	5–2	Gleeson 19', Caddis 22' pen., Toral 31', Donaldson 82', Solomon-Otabor 90+5'	18,888	
21 November 2015	6th	Charlton Athletic	H	L	0–1		16,514	
28 November 2015	6th	Brighton and Hove Albion	A	L	1–2	Toral 21'	27,242	
5 December 2015	7th	Huddersfield Town	H	L	0–2		15,931	
12 December 2015	9th	Middlesbrough	A	D	0–0		20,929	
15 December 2015	8th	Preston North End	A	D	1–1	Morrison 67'	10,668	
18 December 2015	7th	Cardiff City	H	W	1–0	Caddis 45+1' pen.	14,414	
26 December 2015	10th	Sheffield Wednesday	A	L	0–3		28,523	
28 December 2015	9th	Milton Keynes Dons	H	W	1–0	Maghoma 63'	19,714	
2 January 2016	8th	Brentford	H	W	2–1	Maghoma 55', Kieftenbeld 89'	17,555	
12 January 2016	8th	Nottingham Forest	A	D	1–1	Toral 24'	18,342	
16 January 2016	8th	Derby County	A	W	3–0	Robinson 59', Gleeson 74', Kieftenbeld 80'	32,895	
23 January 2016	7th	Ipswich Town	H	W	3–0	Buckley 23', Toral 54', Kieftenbeld 70'	18,272	
30 January 2016	6th	Bristol City	A	D	0–0		15,728	
6 February 2016	8th	Sheffield Wednesday	H	L	1–2	Donaldson 45+5'	20,302	
13 February 2016	7th	Rotherham United	A	D	0–0		11,018	
23 February 2016	7th	Bolton Wanderers	H	W	1–0	Donaldson 29'	15,992	
27 February 2016	8th	Queens Park Rangers	A	L	0–2		17,110	
3 March 2016	7th	Hull City	H	W	1–0	Toral 14'	18,105	
8 March 2016	9th	Blackburn Rovers	A	L	0–2		12,774	
13 March 2016	8th	Wolverhampton Wanderers	A	D	0–0		21,464	
19 March 2016	9th	Fulham	H	D	1–1	Morrison 56'	17,104	
2 April 2016	9th	Charlton Athletic	A	L	1–2	Toral 32'	15,742	
5 April 2016	9th	Brighton & Hove Albion	H	L	1–2	Lafferty 16'	16,143	
9 April 2016	9th	Reading	A	W	2–0	Donaldson 2', Shotton 27'	17,868	
12 April 2016	9th	Leeds United	H	L	1–2	Donaldson 53'	16,081	
16 April 2016	9th	Burnley	H	L	1–2	Maghoma 55'	19,151	
19 April 2016	9th	Preston North End	H	D	2–2	Donaldson 13', 59'	14,366	
23 April 2016	9th	Huddersfield Town	A	D	1–1	Cotterill 73'	13,054	
29 April 2016	9th	Middlesbrough	H	D	2–2	Gleeson 33', Davis 68'	21,380	
7 May 2016	10th	Cardiff City	A	D	1–1	Cotterill 11'	21,022	

=== League table ===
Pos	Team	Pld	W	D	L	GF	GA	GD	Pts
8	Cardiff City	46	17	17	12	56	51	+5	68
9	Brentford	46	19	8	19	72	67	+5	65
10	Birmingham City	46	16	15	15	53	49	+4	63
11	Preston North End	46	15	17	14	45	45	0	62
12	Queens Park Rangers	46	14	18	14	54	54	0	60

Rules for classification: 1) Points; 2) Goal difference; 3) Number of goals scored

=== Results summary ===
Overall								Home						Away					
Pld	W	D	L	GF	GA	GD	Pts	W	D	L	GF	GA	GD	W	D	L	GF	GA	GD
46	16	15	15	53	49	+4	63	9	5	9	27	27	0	7	10	6	26	22	+4

== FA Cup ==
As with all first- and second-tier teams, Birmingham entered the competition at the third-round (last-64) stage. They were drawn at home to Premier League AFC Bournemouth, who had won 8–0 when the two teams met at St Andrew's in the 2014–15 Championship. The visitors made eleven changes from their previous league match, Birmingham seven. Morrison's header from Cotterill's cross after 40 minutes gave his side the lead, but Grounds conceded a penalty four minutes later from which the visitors equalised. Cotterill and Eardley both went off injured at half-time, giving new signing Shane Lowry an opportunity at centre-back. Birmingham were awarded a penalty after an hour. With regular penalty-taker Caddis rested, Vaughan – the son of a Birmingham fan – took the kick and hit it powerfully but too high. Maghoma hit the post when it should have been easier to score, other chances were missed, and with five minutes left, substitute Glenn Murray took advantage of a goalkeeping error to secure a win for Bournemouth.

FA Cup match details
Round	Date	Opponents	Venue	Result	Score F–A	Scorers	Attendance	Refs
Third round	9 January 2016	AFC Bournemouth	H	L	1–2	Morrison 40'	13,140	

== League Cup ==
In the first round, Birmingham were drawn away against Bristol Rovers. This was the second consecutive season that their first-round opponents were the team promoted to the Football League via the Conference play-offs. While wary of the dangers – well illustrated at Blyth Spartans in the 2014–15 FA Cup – of making too many team changes, Rowett still selected only three players who had started the previous league match. There were debuts for youth team product Adam Legzdins, who rejoined the club in the summer, nine years after his single appearance on the first-team bench, and for Jacques Maghoma, who opened the scoring after Wes Thomas intercepted an attempted back pass. Rovers soon equalised, but Andy Shinnie secured the win with a low shot from 25 yards (23 m). Victory came rather more easily in the second round at home to League One club Gillingham, as two goals from Thomas earned Birmingham a trip to Villa Park in the third round.

Because of the history of trouble at recent fixtures against Aston Villa, Birmingham's allocation of tickets was set at 2,800, less than the 10% of capacity required under the rules of the competition, and far fewer than the 6,500 given to another local team, West Bromwich Albion, in the 2014–15 FA Cup. Rowett selected a full-strength team, and Sky Sports' reporter suggested that "Birmingham look set for a good season in the second tier on this evidence", as they were edged out by Villa's half-time additions of Jack Grealish and Jordan Ayew and a Rudy Gestede header.

League Cup match details
Round	Date	Opponents	Venue	Result	Score F–A	Scorers	Attendance	Refs
First round	11 August 2015	Bristol Rovers	A	W	2–1	Maghoma 57', Shinnie 68'	5,650	
Second round	25 August 2015	Gillingham	H	W	2–0	Thomas 35', 72'	9,275	
Third round	22 September 2015	Aston Villa	A	L	0–1		34,442	

== Transfers ==
=== In ===
Date	Player	Club†	Fee	Ref
18 May 2015	Alex Jones	(West Bromwich Albion)	Free	
26 June 2015	Jacques Maghoma	(Sheffield Wednesday)	Free	
27 June 2015	Adam Legzdins	(Leyton Orient)	Free	
1 July 2015	Tomasz Kuszczak	(Wolverhampton Wanderers)	Free	
27 July 2015	Maikel Kieftenbeld	Groningen	Undisclosed	
10 August 2015	Noe Baba	(Fulham)	Free	
21 August 2015	Nicolai Brock-Madsen	Randers FC	Undisclosed	
9 September 2015	Shane Lowry	(Leyton Orient)	Free	
29 September 2015	Emmanuel Mbende	(Borussia Dortmund)	Free	
19 January 2016	Luke Maxwell	Kidderminster Harriers	£75,000	
27 January 2016	Diego Fabbrini	Watford	£1.5 million	

† Brackets around club names indicate the player's contract with that club had expired before he joined Birmingham.

=== Out ===
Date	Player	Club†	Fee	Ref
1 September 2015	Nick Townsend	Barnsley	Undisclosed	
4 January 2016	Demarai Gray	Leicester City	Undisclosed	
27 January 2016	Shane Lowry	(Perth Glory)	Contract cancelled by mutual consent	
28 June 2016	Denny Johnstone	Colchester United	Undisclosed	
30 June 2016	Mark Duffy	(Sheffield United)	Released	
30 June 2016	Neal Eardley	(Hibernian)	Released	
30 June 2016	David Edgar	(Vancouver Whitecaps)	Released	
30 June 2016	Mitch Hancox	(Macclesfield Town)	Released	
30 June 2016	Lee Novak	(Charlton Athletic)	Released	
30 June 2016	Wes Thomas	(Oxford United)	Released	

† Brackets round a club denote the player joined that club after his Birmingham City contract expired.

=== Loan in ===
Date	Player	Club	Return	Ref
30 July 2015	Jon Toral	Arsenal	End of season	
26 November 2015	James Vaughan	Huddersfield Town	End of season	
26 November 2015	Greg Halford	Rotherham United	2 January 2016	
15 January 2016	Will Buckley	Sunderland	End of season	
28 January 2016	Ryan Shotton	Derby County	End of season	
24 March 2016	Kyle Lafferty	Norwich City	End of season	

=== Loan out ===
Date	Player	Club	Return	Ref
3 July 2015	Mark Duffy	Burton Albion	End of season	
31 July 2015	Denny Johnstone	Greenock Morton	End of season	
4 August 2015	Nick Townsend	Barnsley	Made permanent 1 September 2015	
10 August 2015	David Edgar	Sheffield United	End of season	
14 August 2015	Lee Novak	Chesterfield	End of season	
1 September 2015	Wes Thomas	Swindon Town	January 2016	
2 October 2015	Mitch Hancox	Crawley Town	2 January 2016	
10 November 2015	Alex Jones	Grimsby Town	12 December 2015	
12 January 2016	Kyle McFarlane	Nuneaton Town	12 February 2016	
19 January 2016	Luke Maxwell	Kidderminster Harriers	End of season	
23 January 2016	Charlie Cooper	Forest Green Rovers	One month	
27 January 2016	Andrew Shinnie	Rotherham United	7 May 2016	
29 January 2016	Wes Thomas	Bradford City	Three months	
31 January 2016	Alex Jones	Wellington Phoenix	Administratively cancelled 16 February 2016 (Note: The move fell through when New Zealand Football failed to forward the completed paperwork to FIFA before the transfer deadline despite receiving it from the Phoenix three days previously. An appeal failed when FIFA "ruled to protect the integrity of their global deadlines for the transfer of players".)	
12 February 2016	Wes McDonald	Nuneaton Town	One month	
1 March 2016	Perry Cotton	Kettering Town	2 May 2016	
18 March 2016	David Popa	Kettering Town	End of season	

== Appearances and goals ==
Numbers in parentheses denote appearances made as a substitute.
Players marked † left the club during the playing season.
Players with names in italics and marked * were on loan from another club for the whole of their season with Birmingham.
Players listed with no appearances have been in the matchday squad but only as unused substitutes.
Key to positions: GK – Goalkeeper; DF – Defender; MF – Midfielder; FW – Forward

Players' appearances and goals by competition
No.	Pos.	Nat.	Name	League		FA Cup		League Cup		Total		Discipline	
No.	Pos.	Nat.	Name	Apps	Goals	Apps	Goals	Apps	Goals	Apps	Goals	A yellow rectangle, denoting the yellow penalty card shown to a player being cautioned	A red rectangle, denoting the red penalty card shown to a player being sent off
1	GK	ENG	Adam Legzdins	5	0	1	0	2	0	8	0	0	0
2	DF	WAL	Neal Eardley	5	0	1	0	2	0	8	0	2	0
3	DF	ENG	Jonathan Grounds	45	1	1	0	2	0	48	1	7	0
4	DF	ENG	Paul Robinson	20 (5)	3	0	0	2	0	22 (5)	3	4	0
6	MF	NED	Maikel Kieftenbeld	41 (1)	3	1	0	2	0	43 (1)	3	10	0
7	MF	ENG	Demarai Gray †	22 (2)	1	0	0	1 (1)	0	24 (3)	1	1	0
7	MF	ITA	Diego Fabbrini	7 (7)	0	0	0	0	0	7 (7)	0	2	0
8	MF	IRL	Stephen Gleeson	42 (2)	5	0	0	2	0	44 (2)	5	8	0
9	FW	JAM	Clayton Donaldson	38 (2)	11	0	0	1	0	40 (2)	11	4	0
10	FW	ENG	Wes Thomas	0	0	0	0	2	2	2	2	0	0
11	MF	WAL	David Cotterill	24 (5)	4	1	0	0	0	25 (5)	4	4	0
12	DF	ENG	Mitch Hancox	0	0	0	0	1	0	1	0	0	0
15	FW	ENG	James Vaughan *	5 (10)	0	1	0	0	0	6 (10)	0	3	0
16	MF	ENG	Charlee Adams	1 (1)	0	0	0	0	0	1 (1)	0	0	0
17	MF	ENG	Viv Solomon-Otabor	2 (20)	1	1	0	0 (2)	0	3 (22)	1	0	0
18	MF	ENG	Reece Brown	0 (1)	0	0	0	0 (1)	0	0 (2)	0	0	0
19	MF	COD	Jacques Maghoma	25 (15)	5	0 (1)	0	3	1	28 (16)	7	1	0
20	MF	ESP	Jon Toral *	28 (8)	8	0 (1)	0	0 (1)	0	28 (10)	8	6	1
21	FW	ENG	Lee Novak	0	0	0	0	1	0	1	0	1	0
22	MF	SCO	Andrew Shinnie	5 (9)	0	1	0	2	1	8 (9)	1	1	0
23	DF	USA	Jonathan Spector	22 (3)	0	1	0	2 (1)	0	25 (4)	0	3	0
24	MF	GHA	Koby Arthur	0	0	0	0	1 (1)	0	1 (1)	0	0	0
25	DF	AUS	Shane Lowry †	1	0	0 (1)	0	0	0	1 (1)	0	1	0
25	FW	NIR	Kyle Lafferty *	4 (2)	1	0	0	0	0	4 (2)	1	3	0
26	MF	ENG	David Davis	23 (12)	1	1	0	3	0	27 (12)	1	6	0
27	GK	ENG	Connal Trueman	0	0	0	0	0	0	0	0	0	0
28	DF	ENG	Michael Morrison	46	3	1	1	2	0	49	4	5	0
29	GK	POL	Tomasz Kuszczak	41	0	0	0	1	0	42	0	1	0
30	MF	ENG	Will Buckley *	5 (5)	1	0	0	0	0	5 (5)	1	0	0
31	DF	SCO	Paul Caddis	37 (2)	4	0	0	1	0	38 (2)	5	7	0
32	DF	ENG	Ryan Shotton *	9	1	0	0	0	0	9	1	0	0
44	FW	DNK	Nicolai Brock-Madsen	3 (3)	0	0	0	0 (2)	0	3 (5)	0	0	0
45	DF	ENG	Greg Halford * †	0 (3)	0	0	0	0	0	0 (3)	0	0	0

Players not included in matchday squads
No.	Pos.	Nat.	Name
5	DF	CAN	David Edgar
14	FW	ENG	Alex Jones
