= Charlee Adams =

English footballer (born 1995)

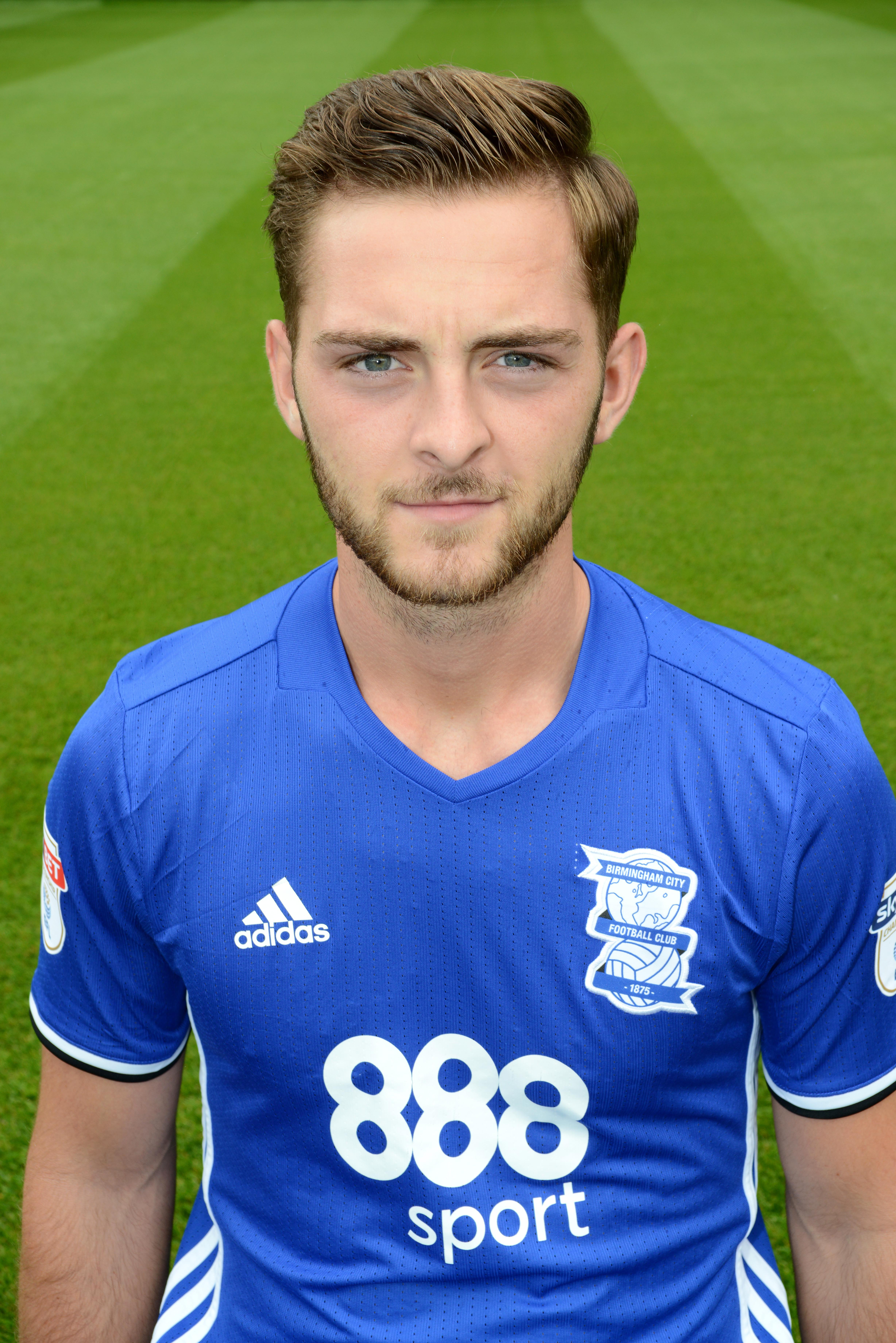
- Adams with Birmingham City in 2016

Personal information
- Full name: Charlee Shaun Adams
- Date of birth: 16 February 1995 (age 31)
- Place of birth: Redbridge, England
- Height: 5 ft 11 in (1.80 m)
- Position: Midfielder

Team information
- Current team: Brentwood Town

Youth career
- –2011: West Ham United
- 2011–2013: Birmingham City

Senior career*
Years	Team	Apps	(Gls)
2013–2017	Birmingham City	2	(0)
2014	→ Lincoln City (loan)	14	(0)
2014–2015	→ Lincoln City (loan)	14	(2)
2016–2017	→ Kilmarnock (loan)	9	(0)
2017–2018	Dagenham & Redbridge	21	(1)
2018–2020	Barnet	42	(2)
2020–2021	Dagenham & Redbridge	10	(0)
2021–2024	Maidenhead United	108	(9)
2024–2026	Hornchurch	38	(3)
2025–2026	→ Chelmsford City (loan)	2	(0)
2026	Chelmsford City	20	(1)
2026–	Brentwood Town	0	(0)

International career^{‡}
2018	England C	2	(0)
- * Club domestic league appearances and goals as of 16:54, 20 July 2026 (UTC) ‡ National team caps and goals as of 21:16, 27 May 2018 (UTC)

Charlee Shaun Adams (born 16 February 1995) is an English professional footballer who plays as a midfielder for Isthmian League Premier Division club Brentwood Town.

Adams began his football career in West Ham United's youth system, and moved in to Birmingham City in 2011. He made his first-team debut for Birmingham in the FA Cup in January 2014, appeared 28 times in the Conference Premier in two spells on loan at Lincoln City, and spent the first half of the 2016–17 campaign on loan at Scottish Premiership club Kilmarnock, before being released at the end of that season. He then played National League football for Dagenham & Redbridge (two spells), Barnet and Maidenhead United before joining Hornchurch in 2024.

== Life and career ==
Adams was born in Redbridge, London, and attended Cumberland School in nearby Newham. As a youngster he was on the books of his local club, West Ham United, but after a trial at the end of the 2010–11 season, he and fellow West Ham trainee Kortney Hause joined Birmingham City's academy. He maintained a blog on the League Football Education website about the progress of his two-year scholarship.

In May 2013, he signed a one-year professional contract with an option for a further year. With Tom Adeyemi injured and Hayden Mullins needed in defence, Adams was given squad number 34 ahead of the Championship visit to Brighton & Hove Albion on 11 January 2014. He travelled as a reserve, but was not part of the matchday squad. Adams was included among the substitutes for Birmingham's FA Cup third-round match against Bristol Rovers three days later, and made his first-team debut as an 89th-minute replacement for Olly Lee with Birmingham 3–0 ahead.

On 31 January, he joined Conference Premier club Lincoln City on loan until the end of the season. He went straight into the starting eleven for the following day's match and played the full 90 minutes as Lincoln beat FC Halifax Town 3–1. According to the Lincolnshire Echo, he "excelled playing in a defensive midfield role. He ratted about and read the game brilliantly to give the City back four the best protection they have had in a long time." He played regularly until the end of the season, and after failing to break into Birmingham's first team in the early part of the new season, returned to Lincoln on loan until 1 January 2015.

He again played regularly. By Christmas, the Echo described him as having "been different class since he arrived for his second loan spell", highlighting "the maturity and intelligence he shows on and off the ball" and "his ability to win the ball and get play going". In the local derby away to Grimsby Town, he scored his first senior goal, a powerful volleyed shot from distance that tied the scores and, according to the Grimsby Telegraph, "changed the complexion" of the match, which Lincoln went on to win 3–1. The goal was shortlisted for the Non-League Paper's National Game Awards Goal of the Season. His loan was initially extended to the end of February, and then to the end of the season. On 3 March 2015, after Adams had played 15 times for Lincoln, he was recalled to Birmingham. Manager Gary Rowett felt his development would be better served by playing regularly in under-21 matches and training with the first team at his parent club, and his progress was rewarded with a new one-year contract with the option of a further year.

Adams made his first Football League appearance on 23 January 2016, as a stoppage-time substitute with Birmingham 3–0 up at home to Ipswich Town in the Championship. Within seconds of coming on, he produced a shot on target from outside the penalty area. In March, the club took up the year's option on Adams' contract. Adams made his first start for Birmingham in the last match of the 2015–16 season, partnering Maikel Kieftenbeld in central midfield away to Cardiff City.

In the face of competition from clubs in England, Adams was reunited with manager Lee Clark on 19 August 2016 when he signed for Scottish Premiership club Kilmarnock on loan until January 2017. He made his debut the following day in the starting eleven for a 2–0 away defeat against Ross County. In his third match, Adams had only been on the field for ten minutes when he was the victim of a late challenge by Dundee defender Kévin Gomis that left a wound through which his tibia was visible. He finished his spell on loan with nine appearances, all in the league. In his first training session after returning to Birmingham, Adams damaged his medial collateral ligament and was out for nearly three months. He was released when his contract expired at the end of the season.

Adams signed a two-year contract with National League club Dagenham & Redbridge ahead of the 2017–18 season.

On 20 March 2018, Adams made his debut for England C, the team that represents the country at non-league level, as a second-half substitute in a 3–2 win against their Welsh counterparts.

On 28 June 2018, Adams joined Barnet for an undisclosed fee. He left the club at the end of the 2019–20 season, having played 57 times, scoring two goals. Adams re-joined Dagenham & Redbridge on 10 October 2020 on a non-contract basis. His registration was terminated on 18 March 2021.

Adams signed for Maidenhead United in August 2021. After eleven goals in 116 appearances, he left the club at the end of the 2023–24 season.

Adams joined Hornchurch for the 2024–25 season. On 26 December 2025, Adams joined Chelmsford City on loan. On 17 January 2026, Adams signed for Chelmsford on a permanent basis. On 21 May 2026, Chelmsford announced Adams had left the club.

On 18 July 2026, Adams joined Isthmian League Premier Division club Brentwood Town.

== Career statistics ==
As of match played 29 March 2025

Appearances and goals by club, season and competition
Club	Season	League			National cup		League cup		Other		Total	
Club	Season	Division	Apps	Goals	Apps	Goals	Apps	Goals	Apps	Goals	Apps	Goals
Birmingham City	2013–14	Championship	0	0	1	0	0	0	—		1	0
Birmingham City	2014–15	Championship	0	0	—		0	0	—		0	0
Birmingham City	2015–16	Championship	2	0	0	0	0	0	—		2	0
Birmingham City	2016–17	Championship	0	0	0	0	0	0	—		0	0
Birmingham City	Total		2	0	1	0	0	0	—		3	0
Lincoln City (loan)	2013–14	Conference Premier	14	0	—		—		—		14	0
Lincoln City (loan)	2014–15	Conference Premier	14	2	—		—		1 (Note: Appearance in FA Trophy)	0	15	2
Lincoln City (loan)	Total		28	2	—		—		1	0	29	2
Kilmarnock (loan)	2016–17	Scottish Premiership	9	0	—		—		—		9	0
Dagenham & Redbridge	2017–18	National League	21	1	2	0	—		1	0	24	1
Barnet	2018–19	National League	26	1	5	0	—		2	0	33	1
Barnet	2019–20	National League	16	1	1	0	—		7 (Note: Five appearances in FA Trophy, two appearances in National League playoffs)	0	24	1
Barnet	Total		42	2	6	0	—		9	0	57	2
Dagenham & Redbridge	2020–21	National League	10	0	3	0	—		2	0	15	0
Maidenhead United	2021–22	National League	36	1	2	0	—		0	0	38	1
Maidenhead United	2022–23	National League	42	6	2	0	—		1	1	45	7
Maidenhead United	2023–24	National League	30	2	1	0	—		2 (Note: Appearance(s) in Berks & Bucks Senior Cup)	1	33	3
Maidenhead United	Total		108	9	5	0	—		3	2	116	11
Hornchurch	2024–25	National League South	30	3	3	1	—		0	0	33	4
Career total			250	17	20	1	0	0	16	2	286	20
