= 2014–15 Birmingham City F.C. season =

Birmingham City F.C.
2014–15 season
- Manager: Lee Clark (until 20 October); Richard Beale and Malcolm Crosby (caretakers, 20–27 October); Gary Rowett (from 27 October)
- Stadium: St Andrew's
- Championship: 10th
- FA Cup: Fourth round
- League Cup: Second round
- Top goalscorer: League: Clayton Donaldson (15); All: Clayton Donaldson (16)
- Highest home attendance: 28,438 (vs West Bromwich Albion, FA Cup 4th round, 24 January 2015)
- Lowest home attendance: 9,816 (vs Cambridge United, League Cup 1st round, 12 August 2014)
- Average home league attendance: 16,111
Home colours	Away colours	Third colours

The 2014–15 season was Birmingham City Football Club's 112th season in the English football league system and fourth consecutive season in the Football League Championship. It ran from 1 July 2014 to 30 June 2015.

On 20 October 2014, with Birmingham 21st in the table and having won at home in the league only once in more than a year, manager Lee Clark and assistant Steve Watson were sacked. Coach Richard Beale and chief scout Malcolm Crosby were put in temporary charge. Gary Rowett, Burton Albion manager and former Birmingham City player, was named as Clark's successor on 27 October.

The team finished in 10th position in the Championship, which was the highest position it had occupied all season. Clayton Donaldson was top scorer with 16 goals, of which all but one were scored in league matches. In the 2014–15 FA Cup, Birmingham lost in the fourth round to Premier League club West Bromwich Albion, and were eliminated by Sunderland, also of the Premier League, in the second round of the League Cup. The average attendance at league matches, of 16,111, was some 4% higher than in 2013–14.

== Background and pre-season ==
Pre-season match details
Date	Opponents	Venue	Result	Score F–A	Scorers	Attendance	Refs
8 July 2014	Cork City	A	W	3–0	Robinson 8', Caddis 83', Novak 89'	1,114	
15 July 2014	Forest Green Rovers	A	W	1–0	Donaldson 18'	1,108	
19 July 2014	Mansfield Town	A	—	—	Cancelled	—	
26 July 2014	Kidderminster Harriers	A	W	3–0	Thomas (2) 37', 46', Donaldson 75'	3,928	
29 July 2014	Notts County	A	W	4–0	Donaldson (2) 13', 58', Shinnie 14', Grounds 89'	2,016	
2 August 2014	Inverness Caledonian Thistle	H	W	3–1	Novak 8', Gray 38', Caddis 89' pen.	4,444	

== Ownership ==
Trading in shares in the club's parent company, Birmingham International Holdings (BIH), was suspended in June 2011 after the arrest of major shareholder Carson Yeung on charges of money-laundering. Publication of financial results was repeatedly delayed, which led the Football League to impose a transfer embargo, and offers for the club were entertained from 2012 onwards. After Yeung resigned his positions with both club and BIH in early 2014, share trading resumed, and following his conviction, efforts intensified to dispose of the club, which had to be done piecemeal in order to retain BIH's share listing. Interest from a consortium fronted by former Swindon Town F.C. chairman Jeremy Wray and one-time deputy managing director of Birmingham City Peter Day, reported to have North American backing, came to nothing. BIH's accounts revealed a £12 million loss over the year ending June 2014.

Chief executive Peter Pannu's service contract expired at the end of September, though he remained a director, and his de facto successor Panos Pavlakis claimed the club was in a sounder financial state than previously. In December, following comments on the Often Partisan website by someone believed to be Pannu, the club issued a statement that "categorically refuted" allegations about their tax affairs and funding status, and the Football League asked the club for an explanation. A few days later, Pannu resigned his directorship of the club, and his appointment as CEO and MD of BIH was terminated.

Relationships within BIH became increasingly factional. At the company's AGM in January 2015, Pannu was re-elected to the board while three directors, including Pavlakis, were not, yet the next day the three were reinstated. The Football League made public their concerns over Yeung's attempts to impose his choice of directors on the BIHL board despite his conviction disqualifying him from exerting influence over a club. On 17 February, the board voluntarily appointed receivers from accountants Ernst & Young to take over management of the company. Their statement stressed that no winding-up petition had been issued and the company was not in liquidation, and the receivers assured the League that the club was not in an "insolvency event" of the type that could trigger a ten-point deduction.

== Football League Championship ==
=== August–September ===
Going into the opening-day visit to Middlesbrough having lost vice-captain Tom Adeyemi to divisional rivals Cardiff City, manager Lee Clark gave starting debuts to Grant Hall, Jonathan Grounds, David Edgar, Stephen Gleeson and, for the second time, to Wes Thomas, and substitute debuts to Mark Duffy and Clayton Donaldson. Birmingham lost 2–0, and in his post-match interview, Clark said the play was too negative: "the stat of no shots on target tells the story". Blues entered the first home game of the season having not won at St Andrew's in the league since October 2013, a second-tier record of 18 winless matches, and with captain Paul Robinson dropped to the bench. A sound defensive display and Thomas's powerful header from David Cotterill's cross just after the break ended the unwanted run of home results. Two draws followed, at home to Ipswich Town, who equalised in stoppage time, and away at Brentford, where Birmingham had a man advantage for 75 minutes and missed numerous chances to make the game safe. August ended with Robinson back in the side and Birmingham in 20th place after a 4–0 defeat at Wigan Athletic, who "could have won even more comprehensively than 4–0 such was their total superiority."

Set up by debutant loanee Brek Shea, Thomas's powerful shot broke the stanchion of the goal, delaying the game by nine minutes. Visitors Leeds United came back to draw, and the 18-year-old Demarai Gray was booked for what the referee perceived as a dive. At home to Sheffield Wednesday, Birmingham failed to profit from having the better of the first half, and lost 2–0 in the second. A deflected shot from Callum Reilly on his first appearance of the season and Gray's "composed finish" over the goalkeeper gave Blues a half-time lead at top-of-the-table Norwich City. A strong penalty appeal for a foul on Donaldson was turned down and Grounds headed wide, but after the break, Cameron Jerome scored twice to restrict his former club to one point. At home to Fulham, Birmingham wasted several first-half chances, took the lead through Cotterill's first goal for the club, and let it slip to lose 2–1. September finished with the customary win at Millwall which left Birmingham 19th in the table. The 18-year-old Koby Arthur started the match, his first appearance since his recall from loan at Cheltenham Town.

=== October ===
After conceding an early goal at previously unbeaten Charlton Athletic, strong performances from Davis and Reilly in midfield and Arthur in attack brought Birmingham back into the game. Arthur's goal was disallowed for offside against Donaldson – opinions varied as to whether he had interfered with play or whether he had indeed been in an offside position at all – but Davis's first goal for the club tied the scores. After a break for international matches, Birmingham lost 1–0 at home to Bolton Wanderers. Randolph was sent off for bringing down an opponent after Caddis's back pass had left him little alternative, and with all three substitutes already used, Lee Novak went in goal to face Craig Davies's penalty; Davies missed.

The result left Birmingham in 21st place, having won only once at home in the league for more than a year. The following Monday, 20 October, Clark took his customary press conference prior to the next day's visit to Blackburn Rovers. Hours later, he and assistant Steve Watson were sacked. Birmingham's chief scout, Malcolm Crosby, who had had some managerial experience with Sunderland, and coach Richard Beale took over the team on a caretaker basis for the Blackburn match. With Randolph suspended, Colin Doyle played his first league game since the 2012 play-offs. Birmingham had the better of the first half, but conceded early in the second, Neil Eardley was sent off for a second booking, and Andy Shinnie, in his first appearance since the opening day, shot against the crossbar in stoppage time.

Birmingham approached the visit of AFC Bournemouth still in 21st place, above the relegation places by a goal difference of one. They lost 8–0, a goal down inside three minutes and a man down three minutes later when Edgar was deemed the last defender. Caddis missed a 53rd-minute penalty that would have made the score 3–1. Bournemouth continued to score at will, including three in the final ten minutes. It was their record league win and Birmingham's record home defeat. Paul Robinson apologised for "that shambles of a game", recognised the fans' disappointment at paying a lot of money to come and watch an unacceptable performance, and promised that he and the rest of the players would take responsibility for putting it right.

MK Dons had refused Birmingham permission to speak to Karl Robinson, and former manager Chris Hughton was reportedly interested in returning, but by the Bournemouth match, the shortlist comprised three men: Owen Coyle, most recently at Wigan Athletic, and the two candidates believed by the media to be joint favourites, Mike Phelan, former assistant to Alex Ferguson at Manchester United, and Burton Albion manager and one-time Birmingham defender Gary Rowett. Described by the Birmingham Mail as "by far the most impressive interviewee", Rowett was appointed on 27 October on a one-year rolling contract. He brought his Burton backroom team with him: Kevin Summerfield, Mark Sale and Kevin Poole, all three former Birmingham players themselves, as respectively assistant manager, first-team coach and goalkeeping coach, and appointed Darren Robinson as head of performance. Crosby and previous goalkeeping coach John Vaughan left the club, and Beale returned to a coaching role.

=== November–December ===
Rowett began what he called the "job that I just couldn't turn down" away at Wolverhampton Wanderers, who were level on points at the top of the table. During the week, he had the players working on "defensive shape and a bit of structure", and had brought in Charlton centre-back Michael Morrison on loan. Morrison replaced the suspended Edgar, and the team lined up with Donaldson as lone striker. Birmingham secured a goalless draw: Grounds' header was well saved, but the same player was perhaps fortunate not to concede a penalty for handball. After two minutes of the home fixture with top-of-the-table Watford, Donaldson's deflected shot produced Birmingham's first goal for more than a month; Watford soon equalised, then with five minutes left, Donaldson headed home from Cotterill's cross to secure a second home league win of the season. A goalless draw with Cardiff City featured disallowed goals for former Birmingham loanee Federico Macheda and substitute Wes Thomas, who was sent off late in the game for striking an opponent.

At Rotherham United, Rowett first picked the starting eleven which was to become his regular selection of choice: in a 4–2–3–1 formation, Randolph in goal, Caddis, Morrison, Robinson and Grounds as a flat back four, Davis and Gleeson in defensive midfield, Cotterill and Gray wide, Shinnie in the hole, and Donaldson as lone striker. Birmingham twice hit the post and missed numerous other chances before Donaldson had time to control the rebound from his saved shot and shoot more accurately for the only goal of the game, and a win that took Birmingham out of the relegation places. Rowett described it as "the most complete performance that we've had since taking over. We played with really good control and some good composure", while his opposite number Steve Evans thought "it looked like two poor teams out there".

At home to Nottingham Forest, a 20-yard (18 m) curled left-footed shot from Cotterill gave Birmingham a lead equalised late in the game by Britt Assombalonga. In the last few minutes, Assombalonga deflected Morrison's header over the bar, and the referee awarded a corner, a decision confirmed by his assistant. When protests continued, the fourth official informed the referee that he had clearly seen the player use his hand to clear the ball, and the referee duly awarded a penalty and sent off the offender. Caddis converted the penalty to give Birmingham a 2–1 win. After the match, it emerged that Forest manager Stuart Pearce had also seen the handball, so accepted that the correct ruling had been made, however unusual it was for a fourth official to become involved in on-field decision-making.

Having gone through November unbeaten, Birmingham began December without Shinnie, who had an ankle problem, and gave Lee Clark's new club, Blackpool, only their second win of the season. Rowett suggested that "a lot of [his players were] playing against their old manager and I think some of them expended a lot of nervous energy in getting up for the game and I don't think that helped them." In contrast, Gray produced a first-half hat-trick at home to Reading, who were three points above them in the table. Rowett praised his "clinical" finishing and his positive response to teasing about his lack of goals. Caddis's powerful shot from Grounds' free kick opened the scoring, Shinnie added a fifth immediately after the interval with a low shot after a dribble from the right, and Cotterill's free kick from wide left that evaded everybody completed a 6–1 win. Nikola Žigić, who had re-signed for the club the previous week for a small fraction of his former salary, was a late substitute. A 1–0 win away to Huddersfield Town courtesy of another Cotterill free kick and some desperate stoppage-time defending preceded an "uninspiring" performance in a 4–0 reverse at home to fifth-placed Derby County in heavy Boxing-Day snow. Two days later, a 10-minute spell just before half-time containing two Cotterill free kicks, one touched in by Donaldson, and a defensive mistake gave Birmingham a three-goal lead, effectively securing their double over Nottingham Forest and taking them into the new year 11 points clear of the relegation places.

=== January–February ===
After a weekend devoted to the third round of the FA Cup, league competition resumed with a Donaldson hat-trick against Wigan Athletic: a second-minute header from Cotterill's cross, a tap-in after Shinnie's shot hit the post, and a claim to the last touch on Gray's goalbound header. The 3–1 win left Birmingham in the top half of the table for the first time since the 2012–13 season. Caddis's early penalty after Donaldson was brought down looked like it would settle the game at Leeds United, but Marco Silvestri's goalkeeping helped Leeds come back into the match, and Luke Murphy equalised when the defence failed to clear a cross. Neither side coped well with a poor Sheffield Wednesday pitch, and what Rowett described as a "fantastic, gritty performance and a very good clean sheet" yielded a point. After fielding the same starting eleven for the previous seven league matches, there were two changes for the visit of Norwich City. One was enforced, Jonathan Spector replacing Morrison, who injured an ankle against Sheffield Wednesday, while loanee Lloyd Dyer came in for the rested Shinnie. Neither side could gain ascendancy in a tight match, and the Birmingham Mail reported that Gray, the subject of a series of rejected bids from divisional rivals Bournemouth ranging up to £5 million, "struggled to emulate [Shinnie's] play-making ways".

Shinnie returned for the visit to Fulham, whose early exploitation of a defensive gap on Birmingham's left was equalised by Cotterill's free kick from wide. Donaldson controlled Gleeson's lofted 40-yard (37 m) pass on his chest but shot wide, and later missed a free header, other chances were missed, and Fulham might have been awarded a penalty late in the game. Three days later, Millwall won at St Andrew's for the first time since 1968 via a header from a free kick. Top-of-the-table Middlesbrough's goalkeeper conceded a penalty and was sent off in first-half stoppage time, but Birmingham were unable to retain their lead. The prolific Patrick Bamford equalised, and Donaldson headed over from six yards in the 94th minute.

Loanee centre-back Rob Kiernan made his debut in central midfield in place of the injured Davis at Brighton & Hove Albion. Early in the match, Randolph let a near-post shot "squirm out of his grasp and over the line", but Donaldson soon equalised. Chances were missed at both ends in a very open game, before Caddis again took a penalty in first-half stoppage time. This time it was saved, and momentum transferred to the hosts, who soon took a 3–1 lead. The introduction of the mobile Thomas and Novak and adoption of a 4–4–2 formation gave Birmingham a new impetus; both scored, but so did Iñigo Calderón for Albion, and the match finished 4–3. Davis returned to midfield for the visit to Ipswich Town, but his presence achieved more in attack than in protecting the defence: he scored twice as Birmingham lost 4–2. Against the background of the club's holding company entering receivership, raising the possibility of a 10-point deduction, Birmingham ended February in 13th position, 11 points above the relegation places, after beating Brentford 1–0 for their first win since 10 January.

=== March–May ===
Loanee Robert Tesche made his debut in midfield in place of the suspended Gleeson against Blackpool in Lee Clark's first return to Birmingham. A single goal decided the match, Tesche's cross landing on the unmarked Shinnie's head. For the visit to Derby County, for whom Rowett had formerly played, he omitted Donaldson for the first time, selecting Novak as the lone striker, and included Dyer in preference to Gray. Derby were in control throughout normal time: they had a two-goal lead, Birmingham had had no shots on target, and Rowett had become "involved in a heated exchange" with opposing players because the ball had not been returned to Birmingham after an injury stoppage. Then Tom Ince tripped Tesche and Caddis converted the penalty in the 93rd minute. Three minutes further into time added on, Thomas pulled the ball back from the byline after a corner, and the ball was scrambled over the line for the equaliser by substitute Donaldson. A rather less eventful home match against Huddersfield Town finished 1–1, and March ended with a poor performance at Cardiff City in which the team lost 2–0 and the manager was sent to the stand for throwing the ball to the ground when disputing a throw-in.

April began with a 2–1 defeat of Rotherham United, featuring a rejected penalty claim that visiting manager Steve Evans called "the worst refereeing decision I've ever seen" and Rowett saw as just a tangle of legs. The trip to AFC Bournemouth started with what Rowett viewed as "some of the best attacking play we've had since I've been here", as the strength of Tesche and Davis in midfield freed Donaldson and Cotterill to give Birmingham a 2–0 lead; the former missed a chance to make it three. By half-time, Bournemouth were level, the first after Randolph had failed to deal with a corner and the second when Callum Wilson "coasted away from Robinson as though the defender was wearing concrete boots", and in the second half, they secured a win that took them top of the table. Robinson "hacked Wilson down" to concede a penalty soon after the break, Bournemouth's fourth came after 74 minutes, and soon afterwards Robinson was sent off for another foul on Wilson. The player – in the side instead of the rested Kiernan, a decision which Rowett later admitted might have been a mistake – assessed the performance as "comfortable and well organised, then we just crumbled for one reason or another", and claimed he was indifferent to criticism from supporters.

Loanee Diego Fabbrini made his debut in the playmaker role at home to Wolverhampton Wanderers, wearing a protective mask over the broken nose that forced him to miss the Bournemouth match. The prolific Benik Afobe gave the visitors an early lead, but Birmingham took the win with goals from a Kiernan header – after Grounds' shot crossed the line unnoticed by the officials and was pushed back into play – and Gray's solo run from deep in his own half, which won the club's Goal of the Season award. Birmingham twice came from behind to draw with Blackburn Rovers; both Grounds and Gray scored their second in three days, but this time Grounds' effort was allowed. Shinnie returned in place of Fabbrini, ineligible to play against his parent club, and came close to scoring as Birmingham held out for nearly an hour at Watford. As soon as the pacy Ikechi Anya and Odion Ighalo were brought on, Watford won a corner from which defender Craig Cathcart scored with an overhead kick.

At Reading, Rowett set the team up in a 3–5–2 formation, with Thomas alongside Donaldson up front and Spector as the third centre-back. A poor performance, mitigated by Randolph's saves and Reading's lack of penetration – their previous match was an extra-time defeat to Arsenal at Wembley in the FA Cup semifinal – was relieved when they reverted to a system the players were used to and enlivened when Gray came on as a late substitute. Donaldson scored an 83rd-minute winner with a header from Gleeson's cross. Fabbrini, who came off after 18 minutes at Reading when his face-mask was split by what Rowett alleged was a punch by Nathaniel Chalobah, returned for the last home match of the season against Charlton Athletic. Birmingham dominated, but scored only once, late in the game, when Dyer shot powerfully across the goalkeeper. The final fixture, away at Bolton Wanderers, was less dramatic than in 2013–14. Tesche scored the only goal of the game after Gray's corner was blocked on the goal-line, to give Birmingham a win that raised them to 10th position, their highest placing of the season.

=== Match results ===
Match results: Championship
Date	League position	Opponents	Venue	Result	Score F–A	Scorers	Attendance	Refs
9 August 2014	20th	Middlesbrough	A	L	0–2		18,371	
16 August 2014	16th	Brighton and Hove Albion	H	W	1–0	Thomas 49'	14,995	
19 August 2014	15th	Ipswich Town	H	D	2–2	Edgar 30', Donaldson 63'	14,022	
23 August 2014	16th	Brentford	A	D	1–1	Caddis 17' pen.	9,076	
30 August 2014	20th	Wigan Athletic	A	L	0–4		11,708	
13 September 2014	20th	Leeds United	H	D	1–1	Thomas 37'	15,266	
16 September 2014	20th	Sheffield Wednesday	H	L	0–2		14,085	
20 September 2014	20th	Norwich City	A	D	2–2	Reilly 8', Gray 41'	26,351	
27 September 2014	21st	Fulham	H	L	1–2	Cotterill 38'	14,132	
30 September 2014	19th	Millwall	A	W	3–1	Donaldson 32', Cotterill 40', Thomas 84'	9,086	
4 October 2014	20th	Charlton Athletic	A	D	1–1	Davis 53'	16,369	
18 October 2014	21st	Bolton Wanderers	H	L	0–1		15,149	
21 October 2014	21st	Blackburn Rovers	A	L	0–1		12,852	
25 October 2014	23rd	AFC Bournemouth	H	L	0–8		13,837	
1 November 2014	22nd	Wolverhampton Wanderers	A	D	0–0		25,135	
4 November 2014	22nd	Watford	H	W	2–1	Donaldson (2) 2', 85'	18,309	
8 November 2014	23rd	Cardiff City	H	D	0–0		15,950	
22 November 2014	19th	Rotherham United	A	W	1–0	Donaldson 62'	10,937	
29 November 2014	17th	Nottingham Forest	H	W	2–1	Cotterill 10', Caddis 89' pen.	18,595	
6 December 2014	19th	Blackpool	A	L	0–1		11,672	
13 December 2014	15th	Reading	H	W	6–1	Caddis 4', Gray (3) 11', 24', 45+1', Shinnie 46', Cotterill 60'	15,240	
20 December 2014	15th	Huddersfield Town	A	W	1–0	Cotterill 70'	13,203	
26 December 2014	16th	Derby County	H	L	0–4		23,851	
28 December 2014	14th	Nottingham Forest	A	W	3–1	Cotterill 35', Donaldson (2) 38', 45'	26,212	
10 January 2015	12th	Wigan Athletic	H	W	3–1	Donaldson (3) 2', 14', 64'	16,117	
17 January 2015	11th	Leeds United	A	D	1–1	Caddis 8' pen.	23,534	
27 January 2015	11th	Sheffield Wednesday	A	D	0–0		18,385	
31 January 2015	11th	Norwich City	H	D	0–0		17,835	
7 February 2015	11th	Fulham	A	D	1–1	Cotterill 14'	19,086	
10 February 2015	11th	Millwall	H	L	0–1		14,186	
18 February 2015	12th	Middlesbrough	H	D	1–1	Caddis 45+1' pen.	15,101	
21 February 2015	15th	Brighton & Hove Albion	A	L	3–4	Donaldson 13', Thomas 76', Novak 90+2'	25,768	
24 February 2015	17th	Ipswich Town	A	L	2–4	Davis 57', 79'	17,161	
28 February 2015	13th	Brentford	H	W	1–0	Tarkowski 40' o.g.	15,333	
4 March 2015	13th	Blackpool	H	W	1–0	Shinnie 36'	15,111	
7 March 2015	14th	Derby County	A	D	2–2	Caddis 90+3' pen., Donaldson 90+6'	31,522	
14 March 2015	15th	Huddersfield Town	H	D	1–1	Cotterill 10'	14,747	
21 March 2015	15th	Cardiff City	A	L	0–2		20,602	
3 April 2015	15th	Rotherham United	H	W	2–1	Tesche 27', Donaldson 43'	16,569	
6 April 2015	15th	AFC Bournemouth	A	L	2–4	Donaldson 18', Cotterill 21'	11,084	
11 April 2015	14th	Wolverhampton Wanderers	H	W	2–1	Kiernan 25', Gray 61'	19,330	
14 April 2015	14th	Blackburn Rovers	H	D	2–2	Grounds 64', Gray 78'	15,066	
18 April 2015	14th	Watford	A	L	0–1		19,156	
22 April 2015	13th	Reading	A	W	1–0	Donaldson 83'	14,604	
25 April 2015	11th	Charlton Athletic	H	W	1–0	Dyer 82'	17,775	
2 May 2015	10th	Bolton Wanderers	A	W	1–0	Tesche 42'	18,614	

=== League table ===
Pos	Team	Pld	W	D	L	GF	GA	GD	Pts
8	Derby County	46	21	14	11	85	56	+29	77
9	Blackburn Rovers	46	17	16	13	66	59	+7	67
10	Birmingham City	46	16	15	15	54	64	−10	63
11	Cardiff City	46	16	14	16	57	61	−4	62
12	Charlton Athletic	46	14	18	14	54	60	−6	60

Updated to match(es) played on 2 May 2015. Source:
Rules for classification: 1) Points; 2) Goal difference; 3) Number of goals scored

=== Results summary ===
Overall								Home						Away					
Pld	W	D	L	GF	GA	GD	Pts	W	D	L	GF	GA	GD	W	D	L	GF	GA	GD
46	16	15	15	54	64	−10	63	10	7	6	29	31	−2	6	8	9	25	33	−8

== FA Cup ==
Birmingham, along with all first- and second-tier teams, entered the competition at the third-round (last-64) stage. They were drawn to visit the lowest-ranked team remaining in the competition, former giant-killer Blyth Spartans of the seventh-tier Northern Premier League. Rowett made ten changes from the side that beat Nottingham Forest, only acting captain Michael Morrison keeping his place. Mitch Hancox, included in the matchday squad for the first time this season, started at left back. Žigić, making his first start since rejoining the club, had an early goal disallowed because of Morrison's foul, and then missed a clear chance from six yards. After Doyle's clearance rebounded just wide of his goal off the nearest Blyth player, home captain Robbie Dale scored twice when Birmingham's defence failed to cope with determined dribbling, and a fine save from Doyle kept the half-time lead down to two. After the break, Birmingham took the lead when a more positive approach led to three goals in a seven-minute spell, one from Novak and two by Thomas. Blyth had more chances, but Birmingham held on.

Before a sell-out crowd of 28,438 at home to local Premier League club West Bromwich Albion in the fourth round, Rowett rested top scorer Donaldson and Demarai Gray, who had just been named December's Football League Young Player of the Month, in favour of Novak and debutant loan signing Lloyd Dyer, and started Randolph for his first cup appearance for Birmingham. The visitors took a two-goal lead; on each occasion, Paul Robinson was unable to prevent the powerful Victor Anichebe converting Saido Berahino's pass. In first-half stoppage time, Dyer's low centre was steered past Boaz Myhill via the post by Grounds for his first goal for the club. After an hour, a collision between Dyer and Myhill left the latter with a split finger, and he was replaced by Albion's other former Birmingham goalkeeper, Ben Foster. Randolph saved well from Joleon Lescott's header and was fortunate when Chris Brunt hit a post, Myhill saved Novak's volleyed shot, and Foster saved twice from substitute Gray, but despite having the better of the second half, Birmingham failed to score.

FA Cup match details
Round	Date	Opponents	Venue	Result	Score F–A	Scorers	Attendance	Refs
Third	3 January 2015	Blyth Spartans	A	W	3–2	Novak 52', Thomas 55', 58'	3,644	
Fourth	24 January 2015	West Bromwich Albion	H	L	1–2	Grounds 45+1'	28,438	

== Football League Cup ==
In the first round, Birmingham were drawn at home to Cambridge United, newly promoted to the Football League via the Conference play-offs. After taking an early lead through Clayton Donaldson's neat finish from a Paul Caddis pass, Birmingham's defence was disrupted by debutant Gavin Gunning's failed attempt to continue after injury – posterior cruciate ligament damage initially expected to keep him out for several months – and Ryan Donaldson ran through to equalise. Saves from regular cup-match goalkeeper Colin Doyle and goalline clearances from Cambridge players took the match into extra time. Five minutes in, Caddis hit a low shot through a crowd of defenders, and ten minutes later, Mark Duffy made the score 3–1.

At home to Premier League club Sunderland in the second round, Birmingham had the better of the match until well into the second half. Caddis drew an early save, Wes Thomas shot wide from close range, and David Cotterill struck the woodwork. After 77 minutes, the Birmingham contingent thought the ball had gone out of play in Sunderland's defensive third, but the referee disagreed; the visitors broke and Jordi Gómez beat Doyle from 25 yards (23 m). In the last few minutes of the match, Donaldson shot wide with an overhead kick, Sunderland broke and doubled their lead, adding a third shortly afterwards.

League Cup match details
Round	Date	Opponents	Venue	Result	Score F–A	Scorers	Attendance	Refs
First	12 August 2014	Cambridge United	H	W	3–1 a.e.t.	Donaldson 16', Caddis 96', Duffy 105+1'	9,816	
Second	27 August 2014	Sunderland	H	L	0–3		11,245	

== Transfers ==
=== In ===
Date	Player	Club†	Fee	Refs
1 July 2014	Jonathan Grounds	(Oldham Athletic)	Free	
1 July 2014	Stephen Gleeson	(Milton Keynes Dons)	Free	
1 July 2014	Wes Thomas	(Rotherham United)	Free	
1 July 2014	David Edgar	(Burnley)	Free	
1 July 2014	Gavin Gunning	(Dundee United)	Free	
1 July 2014	Mark Duffy	(Doncaster Rovers)	Free	
1 July 2014	David Cotterill	(Doncaster Rovers)	Free	
1 July 2014	Clayton Donaldson	(Brentford)	Free	
30 July 2014	Denny Johnstone	(Celtic)	Undisclosed compensation	
11 August 2014	David Davis	Wolverhampton Wanderers	Undisclosed	
20 November 2014	Guy Moussi	(Nottingham Forest)	Free	
4 December 2014	Nikola Žigić	(Birmingham City)	Free	
5 January 2015	Michael Morrison	Charlton Athletic	Undisclosed	

† Brackets around club names indicate the player's contract with that club had expired before he joined Birmingham.

=== Out ===
Date	Player	Club†	Fee	Refs
7 August 2014	Tom Adeyemi	Cardiff City	Undisclosed	
17 January 2015	Guy Moussi	(HJK Helsinki)	Contract expired	
6 May 2015	Will Packwood		Released	
22 May 2015	Matt Green	Mansfield Town	Released	
5 June 2015	Callum Reilly	Burton Albion	Released	
30 June 2015	Amari'i Bell	(Fleetwood Town)	Released	
30 June 2015	Colin Doyle	(Blackpool)	Released	
30 June 2015	Gavin Gunning	(Oldham Athletic)	Released	
30 June 2015	Olly Lee	(Luton Town)	Released	
30 June 2015	Nikola Žigić		Released	
30 June 2015	Darren Randolph	(West Ham United)	Contract expired	

† Brackets round a club denote the player joined that club after his Birmingham City contract expired.

=== Loan in ===
Date	Player	Club	Return	Refs
6 June 2014	Grant Hall	Tottenham Hotspur	Terminated early 5 January 2015	
12 September 2014	Brek Shea	Stoke City	13 December 2014	
31 October 2014	Michael Morrison	Charlton Athletic	Made permanent 5 January 2015	
19 January 2015	Lloyd Dyer	Watford	End of season	
2 March 2015	Robert Tesche	Nottingham Forest	End of season	
26 March 2015	Diego Fabbrini	Watford	End of season	

=== Loan out ===
Date	Player	Club	Return	Refs
9 July 2014	Amari'i Bell	Mansfield Town	Recalled 17 August 2014	
25 July 2014	Koby Arthur	Cheltenham Town	Recalled 14 September 2014	
5 August 2014	Nick Townsend	Lincoln City	Recalled 5 January 2015	
28 August 2014	Reece Brown	Notts County	27 September 2014	
12 September 2014	George McGee	Rushall Olympic	14 October 2014	
26 September 2014	James Fry	Leamington	7 March 2015	
26 September 2014	Amari'i Bell	Swindon Town	3 January 2015	
14 November 2014	Charlee Adams	Lincoln City	Recalled 3 March 2015	
21 November 2014	Connal Trueman	Leamington	3 January 2015	
24 November 2014	Will Packwood	Colchester United	Recalled 11 December 2014	
27 November 2014	Denny Johnstone	Macclesfield Town	Recalled 2 February 2015	
8 January 2015	Reece Webb	Stourbridge	7 February 2015	
9 January 2015	Nat Kelly	Kidderminster Harriers	9 February 2015	
12 January 2015	George McGee	Hednesford Town	12 February 2015	
16 January 2015	Olly Lee	Plymouth Argyle	End of season	
21 January 2015	David Edgar	Huddersfield Town	End of season	
22 January 2015	Neal Eardley	Leyton Orient	Recalled 9 February 2015	
2 February 2015	Denny Johnstone	Cheltenham Town	Recalled by 9 March 2015	
2 February 2015	Mark Duffy	Chesterfield	1 March 2015	
13 February 2015	Callum Preston	AFC Telford United	14 March 2015	
11 March 2015	Callum Reilly	Burton Albion	End of season	
11 March 2015	Will Packwood	Cheltenham Town	End of season	
20 March 2015	Amari'i Bell	Gillingham	End of season	
26 March 2015	James Fry	Kidderminster Harriers	25 April 2015	
26 March 2015	Nat Kelly	Kidderminster Harriers	25 April 2015	
26 March 2015	Liam Truslove	Leamington	25 April 2015	
26 March 2015	Denny Johnstone	Burton Albion	End of season	

== Appearances and goals ==
Numbers in parentheses denote appearances made as a substitute.
Players marked † left the club during the playing season.
Players with names in italics and marked * were on loan from another club for the whole of their season with Birmingham.
Players listed with no appearances have been in the matchday squad but only as unused substitutes.
Key to positions: GK – Goalkeeper; DF – Defender; MF – Midfielder; FW – Forward

Players' appearances and goals by competition
No.	Pos.	Nat.	Name	League		FA Cup		League Cup		Total		Discipline	
No.	Pos.	Nat.	Name	Apps	Goals	Apps	Goals	Apps	Goals	Apps	Goals	A yellow rectangle, denoting the yellow penalty card shown to a player being cautioned	A red rectangle, denoting the red penalty card shown to a player being sent off
1	GK	IRL	Darren Randolph	45	0	1	0	0	0	46	0	0	1
2	DF	WAL	Neal Eardley	4	0	1	0	1	0	6	0	2	1
3	DF	ENG	Jonathan Grounds	45	1	1	1	1	0	47	2	8	0
4	DF	ENG	Paul Robinson	30 (4)	0	1	0	1	0	32 (4)	0	7	1
5	DF	IRL	Gavin Gunning	0	0	0	0	1	0	1	0	0	0
6	DF	CAN	David Edgar	14 (2)	1	1	0	1 (1)	0	16 (3)	1	1	1
7	MF	ENG	Mark Duffy	1 (3)	0	1	0	1 (1)	1	3 (4)	1	1	0
8	MF	IRL	Stephen Gleeson	34 (5)	0	1	0	1	0	36 (5)	0	3	1
9	FW	ENG	Clayton Donaldson	44 (2)	15	0	0	2	1	46 (2)	16	1	0
10	FW	ENG	Wes Thomas	10 (23)	4	1 (1)	2	2	0	13 (24)	6	3	1
11	MF	WAL	David Cotterill	42	9	1	0	2	0	45	9	7	0
12	FW	ENG	Lee Novak	9 (12)	1	2	1	0 (2)	0	11 (14)	2	1	0
~~13~~	MF	USA	Brek Shea * †	2 (4)	0	0	0	0	0	2 (4)	0	0	0
13	MF	GER	Robert Tesche *	12	2	0	0	0	0	12	2	2	0
14	DF	USA	Will Packwood	0 (1)	0	0	0	0	0	0 (1)	0	0	0
15	DF	ENG	Grant Hall * †	7	0	0	0	2	0	9	0	0	0
15	DF	IRL	Rob Kiernan *	11 (1)	1	0	0	0	0	11 (1)	1	0	0
16	FW	SCO	Denny Johnstone	0 (2)	0	0	0	0	0	0 (2)	0	0	0
17	MF	IRL	Callum Reilly	4 (13)	1	1	0	0	0	5 (13)	1	0	0
18	DF	ENG	Mitch Hancox	0	0	1	0	0	0	1	0	1	0
19	FW	SRB	Nikola Žigić	0 (9)	0	1 (1)	0	0	0	1 (10)	0	1	0
20	MF	ENG	Olly Lee	0	0	0	0	0	0	0	0	0	0
21	GK	IRL	Colin Doyle	1	0	1	0	2	0	4	0	0	0
22	MF	SCO	Andrew Shinnie	24 (3)	2	1	0	0	0	25 (3)	2	3	0
23	DF	USA	Jonathan Spector	20 (4)	0	0	0	1 (1)	0	21 (5)	0	3	0
24	MF	GHA	Koby Arthur	7 (2)	0	0 (1)	0	0	0	7 (3)	0	1	0
26	MF	ENG	David Davis	36 (6)	3	1	0	1	0	38 (6)	3	7	0
27	GK	ENG	Connal Trueman	0	0	0	0	0	0	0	0	0	0
28	DF	ENG	Michael Morrison	21	0	2	0	0	0	23	0	0	0
29	MF	ENG	Reece Brown	0 (1)	0	0	0	0	0	0 (1)	0	0	0
31	DF	SCO	Paul Caddis	44 (1)	6	1	0	2	1	47 (1)	7	5	0
33	MF	ENG	Demarai Gray	28 (13)	6	0 (1)	0	1	0	29 (14)	6	2	0
36	MF	ITA	Diego Fabbrini *	5	0	0	0	0	0	5	0	0	0
39	MF	FRA	Guy Moussi †	0 (2)	0	1	0	0	0	1 (2)	0	0	0
40	MF	ENG	Lloyd Dyer *	7 (11)	1	1	0	0	0	8 (11)	1	1	0

Players not included in matchday squads
No.	Pos.	Nat.	Name
25	FW	ENG	Matt Green
30	GK	ENG	Nick Townsend
32	DF	ENG	Amari'i Bell
34	MF	ENG	Charlee Adams
35	DF	ENG	Josh Martin
