= Martin Jiránek =

Czech footballer

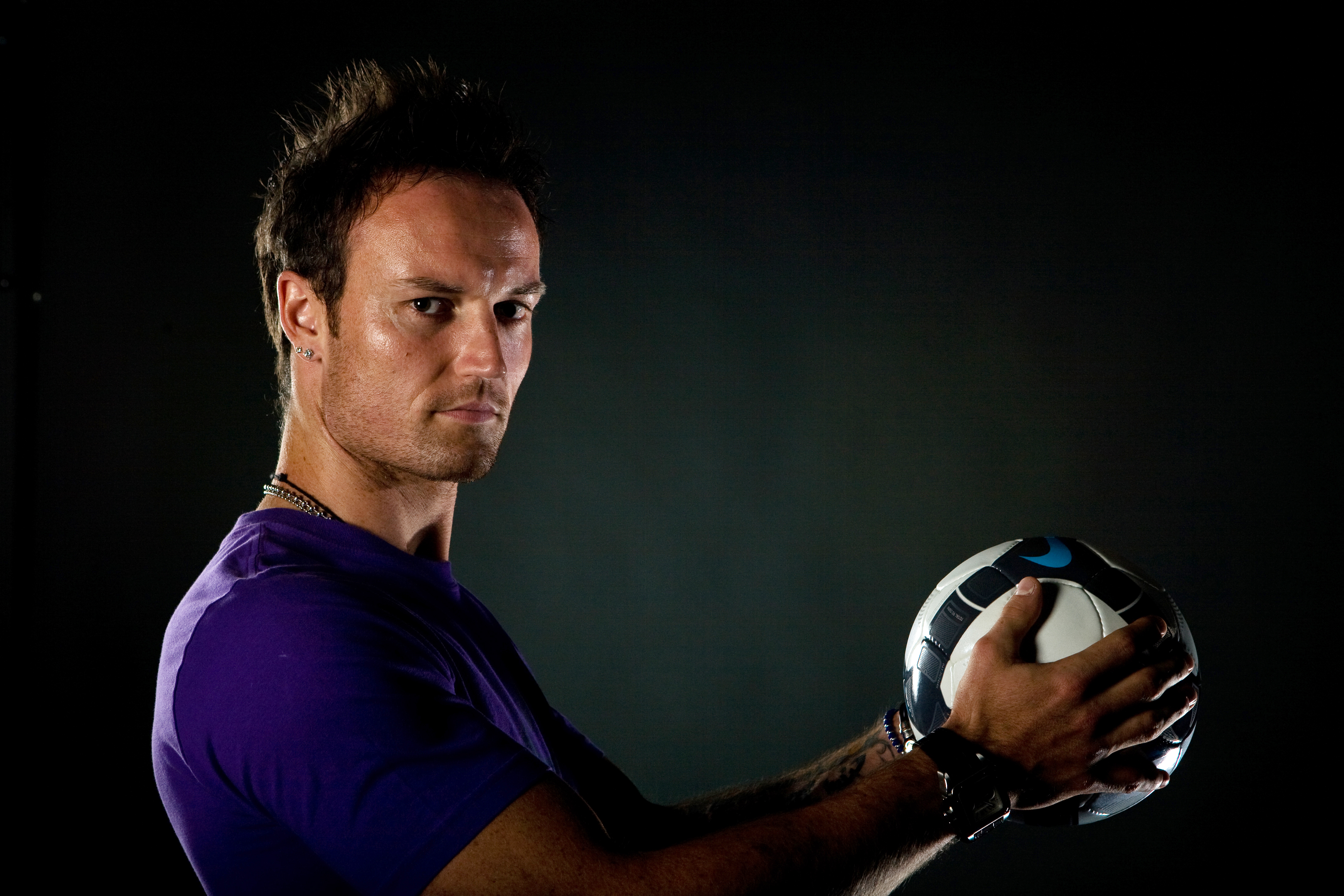

Personal information
- Full name: Martin Jiránek
- Date of birth: 25 May 1979 (age 47)
- Place of birth: Prague, Czechoslovakia
- Height: 1.83 m (6 ft 0 in)
- Position: Centre back

Youth career
- 1985–1994: Radotinský SK
- 1994–1997: Bohemians Prague

Senior career*
Years	Team	Apps	(Gls)
1997–1999	Bohemians Prague	55	(4)
1999	→ Tatran Poštorná (loan)	11	(0)
1999–2001	Slovan Liberec	32	(0)
2001–2004	Reggina	100	(3)
2004–2010	Spartak Moscow	136	(4)
2010–2011	Birmingham City	10	(0)
2011–2013	Terek Grozny	47	(1)
2013–2016	Tom Tomsk	74	(0)
2016–2017	Příbram	21	(1)
2017–2018	Dukla Prague	27	(0)
Total		513	(13)

International career
2000–2002	Czech Republic U-21	20	(4)
2002–2007	Czech Republic	31	(0)
Medal record
Men's football
Representing Czech Republic
UEFA European Championship
Bronze medal – third place	2004 Portugal
UEFA European Under-21 Championship
Winner	2002 Switzerland
- * Club domestic league appearances and goals as of 30 June 2018

Martin Jiránek (Czech pronunciation: [ˈmarcɪn ˈjɪraːnɛk]; born 25 May 1979 in Prague) is a former Czech international footballer. A defender, Jiránek played in the top division of several countries.

Jiránek played in a number of international tournaments for his country. In 2002, he was part of the Czech under 21 side which won the 2002 UEFA European Under-21 Football Championship in Switzerland. He subsequently travelled with the senior international squad for the Euro 2004 and 2006 World Cup tournaments.

== Career ==
=== Club ===
==== Early career ====
Jiránek started his professional career in 1997 for Bohemians Prague, making 55 appearances, before leaving for Slovan Liberec in 1999. He made 32 appearances, and helped Slovan to win the Czech Cup in the 1999/2000 season.

==== Reggina ====
In 2001, Jiranek moved to Italian Serie B side Reggina. In his time at Reggina, Jiranek would make 100 league appearances, helping Reggina gain promotion to Serie A in the 2001/02 season.

==== Spartak Moscow ====
Spartak Moscow signed Jiránek in 2004 for €4.7m from Reggina. Jiránek made his debut against FC Lokomotiv Moscow. Jiránek was a regular in the starting line-up for six years. Jiránek was the captain of the team in 2009–2010.

==== Birmingham City ====
On 31 August 2010, he moved to English Premier League club Birmingham City, signing a one-year deal, having rejected offers from a variety of clubs. Jiránek made his debut in the starting eleven for the League Cup third-round match against MK Dons, and had a good chance to score as Birmingham won 3–1. His second start came in a tidy performance as several first-team regulars were rested for the FA Cup third round tie against Millwall which Birmingham won 4–1. After Scott Dann was injured in the first leg of the League Cup semi-final against West Ham United, Jiránek became a regular starter, and he was in the starting eleven as Birmingham beat favourites Arsenal 2–1 in the League Cup Final at Wembley Stadium. A toe injury that eventually required surgery disrupted the latter part of his season, and following Birmingham's relegation from the Premier League, he rejected the option of another season with the club.

==== Terek Grozny ====
In July 2011, Jiránek signed a two-year contract with Russian Premier League club Terek Grozny. In his second season with the club he scored a goal from 45 yards in the league game against Kuban Krasnodar.

=== International ===
Jiránek was part of the Czech side which won the UEFA U-21 Championships in 2002. He made his senior international debut against Poland in 2002. Jiránek's first major international tournament came at Euro 2004, where he made 4 appearances before being ruled out of the semi-final with a thigh injury. He also was named in the Czech squad for the 2006 World Cup, but despite playing 5 qualifying matches, he did not make an appearance at the finals. He appeared in 5 qualifying matches for Euro 2008, but was not named in the Czech squad due to an ankle injury. His 31st (and as of February 2011, last) appearance was in March 2007, against Germany - after which, he was fined for his involvement in a birthday party with prostitutes.

== Career statistics ==
=== Club ===
As of match played 30 June 2018

Appearances and goals by club, season and competition
Club	Season	League			National Cup		League Cup		Continental		Other		Total	
Club	Season	Division	Apps	Goals	Apps	Goals	Apps	Goals	Apps	Goals	Apps	Goals	Apps	Goals
Spartak Moscow	2004	Russian Premier League	12	0			-		-		-		12	0
Spartak Moscow	2005	Russian Premier League	22	0			-		-		-		22	0
Spartak Moscow	2006	Russian Premier League	26	2	4	0	-		10	0	-		30	2
Spartak Moscow	2007	Russian Premier League	11	0	3	0	-		-		1	0	15	0
Spartak Moscow	2008	Russian Premier League	26	0	0	0	-		7	0	-		26	0
Spartak Moscow	2009	Russian Premier League	29	1	2	0	-		-		-		31	1
Spartak Moscow	2010	Russian Premier League	10	1	0	0	-		-		-		10	1
Spartak Moscow	Total		136	4	9	0	-	-	17	0	1	0	163	4
Birmingham City	2010–11	Premier League	10	0	3	0	3	0	–		–		16	0
Terek Grozny	2011–12	Russian Premier League	22	0	2	0	-		-		-		24	0
Terek Grozny	2012–13	Russian Premier League	25	1	2	0	-		-		-		27	1
Terek Grozny	2013–14	Russian Premier League	0	0	0	0	-		-		-		0	0
Terek Grozny	Total		45	1	4	0	-	-	-	-	-	-	49	1
Tom Tomsk	2013–14	Russian Premier League	20	0	0	0	-		-		2	0	22	0
Tom Tomsk	2014–15	Russian National League	21	0	0	0	-		-		-		21	0
Tom Tomsk	2015–16	Russian National League	31	0	0	0	-		-		-		31	0
Tom Tomsk	Total		72	0	0	0	-	-	-	-	2	0	74	0
Příbram	2016–17	Czech First League	21	1	0	0	–		–		–		21	1
Dukla Prague	2017–18	Czech First League	27	0	0	0	–		–		–		27	0
Career total			311	6	16	0	3	0	17	0	3	0	350	6

=== International ===
Czech Republic
Year	Apps	Goals
2002	3	0
2003	3	0
2004	10	0
2005	4	0
2006	8	0
2007	3	0
Total	31	0

Statistics accurate as of match played 28 March 2007

== Honours ==
Slovan Liberec

- Czech Cup: 1999–2000

Birmingham City

- Football League Cup: 2010–11
