= Roger Johnson (footballer) =

English footballer (born 1983)

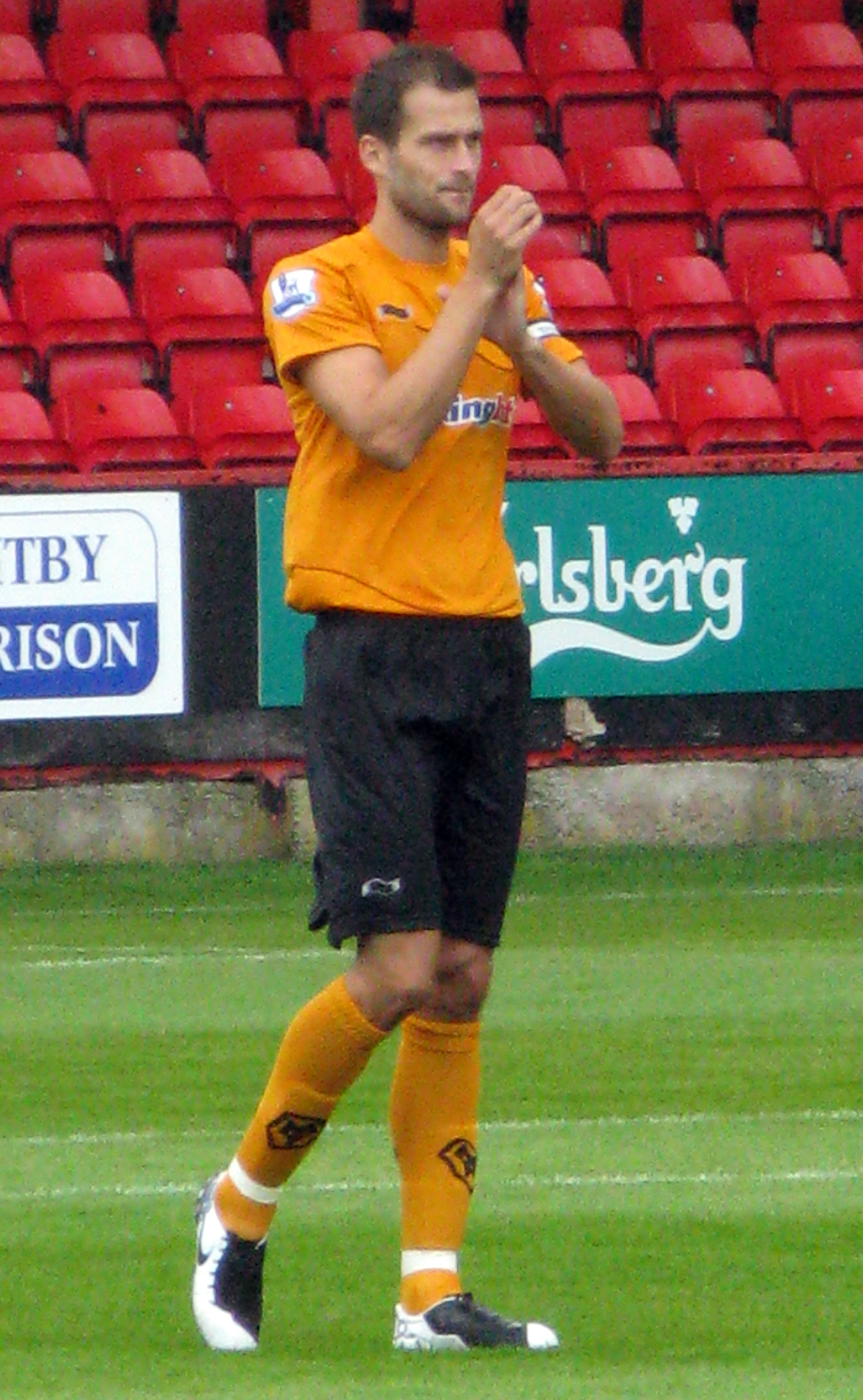
- Johnson in Wolves pre-season, 2011

Personal information
- Full name: Roger Johnson
- Date of birth: 28 April 1983 (age 43)
- Place of birth: Ashford, England
- Height: 6 ft 3 in (1.91 m)
- Position: Defender

Youth career
- 1998–2000: Wycombe Wanderers

Senior career*
Years	Team	Apps	(Gls)
2000–2006	Wycombe Wanderers	157	(19)
2006–2009	Cardiff City	119	(12)
2009–2011	Birmingham City	76	(2)
2011–2015	Wolverhampton Wanderers	69	(2)
2013–2014	→ Sheffield Wednesday (loan)	17	(0)
2014	→ West Ham United (loan)	4	(0)
2015	Charlton Athletic	14	(0)
2015	Pune City	11	(0)
2016–2017	Charlton Athletic	6	(0)
2017–2019	Bromley (Note: Both Soccerbase and Soccerway omit one 2017–18 National League match. Soccerbase omits the match at Tranmere Rovers on 17 February, Soccerway omits the match at Aldershot Town on 20 February. Johnson played in both fixtures, as confirmed at Bromley F.C.'s website.)	52	(2)
Total		525	(37)

Managerial career
- 2022–2023: Brackley Town
- * Club domestic league appearances and goals

Roger Johnson (born 28 April 1983) is an English football manager and retired footballer who was most recently manager at Brackley Town.

Johnson began his career with Wycombe Wanderers, where he spent six years as a professional. He then joined Welsh side Cardiff City in 2006 for £275,000. He was part of the team that reached the 2008 FA Cup final and was twice chosen as the club's Player of the Year in his three-year stint with the club.

He moved into the Premier League by signing for Birmingham City in 2009 for £5 million, with whom he won the 2011 League Cup. He departed Birmingham in 2011 after their relegation to join Midlands neighbours Wolverhampton Wanderers, with whom he suffered two further consecutive relegations, leading to his exclusion from first team involvement. After loan spells with Sheffield Wednesday and West Ham United, Johnson left Wolves by mutual consent, and spent the latter part of the 2014–15 season with Charlton Athletic. He played for Indian Super League club Pune City in 2015 before returning to Charlton in January 2016. Released at the end of the season, Johnson signed a short-term contract with Bromley in October 2017.

== Career ==
=== Wycombe Wanderers ===
Johnson spent time at Portsmouth and AFC Bournemouth before joining Wycombe Wanderers as a 15-year-old, where he developed through the club's youth system. He made his first-team debut for Wycombe in the final game of the 1999–2000 season against Cambridge United, becoming the youngest ever player to make a Football League appearance for the club at the time, at the age of 17 years and 8 days. The following season, Johnson also made one substitute appearance, and was on the bench as Wycombe beat Premier League club Leicester City in the FA Cup quarter-finals. The 2003–04 season saw Johnson in and out of the side under manager Tony Adams but he was still awarded the Fans' Player of the Year Award.

After the departure of Adams after one season (6 months), Johnson became a regular in the side and was handed the captaincy by new manager John Gorman when he took over in November 2004, as well as finishing second in the player of the year award to forward Nathan Tyson.

=== Cardiff City ===
After 183 appearances and 22 goals for Wycombe, Johnson joined Cardiff City on 4 July 2006 for a fee of £275,000; Cardiff's local rivals Swansea City £100,000 bid was rejected.

Johnson had a strong first year at Cardiff, and after spending the first six months as a regular substitute, began to form a dominant pairing with Dutchman Glenn Loovens which saw them keep club captain Darren Purse out of the side. In the 2007–08 season he began to score goals, with late winners against Norwich City in the League and Brighton & Hove Albion in the League Cup, as well as vital equalisers against Hull City and Preston North End. Johnson scored the second goal of Cardiff's memorable 2–0 away victory over Premier League Middlesbrough in the 2007–08 FA Cup quarter-final, and his header in the Severnside Derby match against Bristol City in March 2008 was his seventh goal of the season. He played in all six of Cardiff's matches on their way to the FA Cup final, in which they lost 1–0 to Portsmouth, and at the end of the season he was awarded the club's Player of the Year award.

The summer transfer window saw prolonged interest in Johnson; both Ipswich Town and West Bromwich Albion had bids rejected. Despite the interest Johnson remained with the side into the new season although he did see his centre-back partner Glenn Loovens leave to join Celtic. On the opening day of the season, Johnson scored a late winning goal against Southampton as Cardiff came away with a 2–1 win. Despite continued changes in his defensive partner, having played alongside Loovens, Purse and new signing Gábor Gyepes, who forced his way into the side past Purse in November, Johnson passed 100 appearances for the club, and had played every minute of the season until he had to leave the field during a 2–0 victory over Crystal Palace on 11 April 2009, after being hit in the throat by an elbow from Palace defender Claude Davis. After the incident Johnson suffered breathing difficulties and was forced to spend two nights in hospital as well as having daily checks throughout the following week. Davies was found guilty of violent conduct by the Football Association and banned for three matches. Johnson was forced to miss the next match, a 3–1 win over Burnley, but returned for the 6–0 defeat to Preston North End the following week. He was chosen as the club's player of the year for the second year running, and was named in the Championship Team of the Year.

=== Birmingham City ===
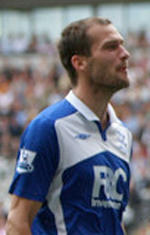
Playing for Birmingham, September 2009

In June 2009, after two previous bids had been rejected, Cardiff accepted an offer of £5m from Birmingham City. Johnson, described by former teammate Tony Capaldi as "definitely captain material", signed a three-year deal with the club on 25 June 2009, stating "Premier League football is the dream at the start of any footballer's career so I am pleased I have been given that chance with Birmingham and I can't wait to get started." He made "an impressive debut" in Birmingham's first match of the season, a 1–0 defeat at Manchester United. He was part of the Birmingham team which went 12 games unbeaten, a club record for the top flight; at Christmas, The Times' correspondent Patrick Barclay described Johnson and defensive partner Scott Dann as "the players of 2009–10 thus far"; and Johnson was suggested as a possible England player. Johnson scored his first goal for the club away against Bolton Wanderers on 29 August 2010, and his second opened the scoring in the Second City derby against Aston Villa in January 2011.

Johnson's header set up the opening goal for Nikola Žigić as Birmingham City defeated favourites Arsenal 2–1 to win the 2011 Football League Cup final. The Daily Telegraph described him as "an inspiring defensive presence throughout".

=== Wolverhampton Wanderers ===
On 11 July 2011, Birmingham accepted a bid from Premier League club Wolverhampton Wanderers for Johnson. Two days later, Johnson signed a four-year contract with Wolves. The fee was officially undisclosed, and the club claimed that reports of a £7m fee were inaccurate; the Wolverhampton-based Express & Star newspaper reported that the club had paid "a flat fee with no add-ons" of "just over £4m".

Johnson was almost immediately handed the captaincy of Wolves by Mick McCarthy shortly before the start of the new season, relieving former captain Karl Henry of his duties. The season proved problematic for Johnson and his new team though and McCarthy was sacked in February 2012, following which Johnson said the players had let the manager down. After assistant manager Terry Connor was promoted to fill the vacancy, Johnson featured in only two further matches that season. During March 2012 he was disciplined by the club after turning up for training "unfit to train properly", widely reported as being due to alcohol; Johnson apologised for his conduct and retained the captaincy. Later that same month, he had an on-field dispute with teammate Wayne Hennessey.

With Wolves relegated back to the Championship, new manager Ståle Solbakken brought Johnson back into the team. Solbakken was however dismissed in January 2013, and although Johnson retained his place in the team, once again the club were relegated, meaning Johnson had now been relegated in each of the last three seasons.

With the arrival of Kenny Jackett as Wolves manager, it was announced in June 2013 that Johnson was available for transfer and he was not issued with a squad number. No sale took place during the summer transfer window, and on 16 September, Johnson joined Championship club Sheffield Wednesday on loan for three months. He made 17 loan appearances before the deal expired, but Sheffield Wednesday caretaker manager Stuart Gray confirmed that he was attempting to extend the loan agreement.

On 6 January 2014, he joined Premier League club West Ham United on loan for the remainder of the 2013–14 season. Johnson played six games in all competitions for West Ham, his first coming on 8 January 2014 in a 6–0 away defeat to Manchester City in a semi-final of the League Cup.

Johnson remained at Wolves, now back in the Championship, at the start of the 2014–15 season after the club received no offers during the close season for the player. He was again not issued with a squad number and did not play any first team football during the first half of the campaign. In an interview on Soccer AM, Johnson revealed he trained during afternoons, away from the first team group, but "would probably give up a fair amount of money if I just walked out". On 2 February 2015, the final day of the January transfer window, it was announced that his contract with Wolves had been terminated by mutual consent.

=== Charlton Athletic ===
On 3 February 2015, following the termination of his contract with Wolves, Johnson signed a deal with Championship side Charlton Athletic to last until the end of the season. He started 14 of Charlton's remaining 16 matches.

On 12 May 2015, Johnson was released at the end of his contract.

=== Pune City ===
On 18 August 2015, Johnson joined Indian Super League side FC Pune City for the 2015 tournament.

=== Return to Charlton Athletic ===
On 4 January 2016, Johnson re-signed for Charlton Athletic on an 18-month contract. He was released in May 2017.

=== Bromley ===
Johnson signed for National League club Bromley on a short-term deal in October 2017. He made his debut on 14 October in an FA Cup fourth qualifying round match away to Dover Athletic, playing until the 90th minute and helping his team achieve a goalless draw. Johnson helped Bromley reach the FA Trophy final at Wembley Stadium against Brackley Town, however he conceded an own goal in the 95th minute. Bromley went on to lose on a penalty shoot-out. While at Bromley he used his Cardiff City connections to get on the Football Association of Wales' coaching course to attain a UEFA A licence. On 16 May 2019, Bromley announced that Johnson had left the club. The following year he returned to the club as manager of the under-23s team. In April 2021, Johnson moved to work alongside Andy Woodman in the first team as a coach.

== Coaching career ==
=== Brackley Town ===
On 29 September 2022, Johnson was appointed manager of National League North club Brackley Town. In April 2023, he departed the club by mutual consent with them sitting in fourth position.

== Personal life ==
Johnson was born in Ashford, Surrey. He attended St Michael's Middle School in Colehill, Dorset, and then Queen Elizabeth's School, Wimborne Minster. Together with his brothers, Johnson supported Chelsea; he held a season ticket for ten years.

== Career statistics ==
As of match played 27 April 2019

Appearances and goals by club, season and competition
Club	Season	League			FA Cup		League Cup		Other		Total	
Club	Season	Division	Apps	Goals	Apps	Goals	Apps	Goals	Apps	Goals	Apps	Goals
Wycombe Wanderers	1999–2000	Second Division	1	0	0	0	0	0	0	0	1	0
Wycombe Wanderers	2000–01	Second Division	1	0	0	0	0	0	0	0	1	0
Wycombe Wanderers	2001–02	Second Division	7	1	0	0	0	0	2 (Note: Appearance(s) in Football League Trophy)	0	9	1
Wycombe Wanderers	2002–03	Second Division	33	3	0	0	1	0	1	0	35	3
Wycombe Wanderers	2003–04	Second Division	28	2	3	0	2	0	3	1	36	3
Wycombe Wanderers	2004–05	League Two	42	6	2	1	1	0	3	0	48	7
Wycombe Wanderers	2005–06	League Two	45	7	1	0	2	1	5 (Note: Three appearances in Football League Trophy, two in Football League Two play-offs)	0	53	8
Wycombe Wanderers	Total		157	19	6	1	6	1	14	1	183	22
Cardiff City	2006–07	Championship	32	2	0	0	1	0	—		33	2
Cardiff City	2007–08	Championship	42	5	6	1	4	1	—		52	7
Cardiff City	2008–09	Championship	45	5	3	0	3	0	—		51	5
Cardiff City	Total		119	12	9	1	8	1	—		136	14
Birmingham City	2009–10	Premier League	38	0	5	0	0	0	—		43	0
Birmingham City	2010–11	Premier League	38	2	1	0	6	1	—		45	3
Birmingham City	Total		76	2	6	0	6	1	—		88	3
Wolverhampton Wanderers	2011–12	Premier League	27	0	1	0	0	0	—		28	0
Wolverhampton Wanderers	2012–13	Championship	42	2	1	0	1	0	—		44	2
Wolverhampton Wanderers	2013–14	League One	0	0	0	0	0	0	0	0	0	0
Wolverhampton Wanderers	2014–15	Championship	0	0	0	0	0	0	—		0	0
Wolverhampton Wanderers	Total		69	2	2	0	1	0	0	0	72	2
Sheffield Wednesday (loan)	2013–14	Championship	17	0	—		—		—		17	0
West Ham United (loan)	2013–14	Premier League	4	0	—		2	0	—		6	0
Charlton Athletic	2014–15	Championship	14	0	—		—		—		14	0
FC Pune City	2015	Indian Super League	11	0	—		—		—		11	0
Charlton Athletic	2015–16	Championship	4	0	1	0	—		—		5	0
Charlton Athletic	2016–17	League One	2	0	1	0	1	0	3 (Note: Appearances in EFL Trophy)	0	7	0
Charlton Athletic	Total		6	0	2	0	1	0	3	0	12	0
Bromley	2017–18	National League	19	1	3	0	—		7 (Note: Appearances in FA Trophy)	0	29	1
Bromley	2018–19	National League	33	1	1	1	—		1 (Note: Appearances in FA Trophy)	0	35	2
Bromley	Total		52	2	4	1	—		8	0	64	3
Career total			525	37	29	3	24	3	25	1	603	44

== Honours ==
Cardiff City

- FA Cup runner-up: 2007–08

Birmingham City

- Football League Cup: 2010–11

Bromley

- FA Trophy runner-up: 2017–18

Individual

- PFA Team of the Year: 2005–06 League Two, 2008–09 Championship
