= 2010–11 Birmingham City F.C. season =

Birmingham City
2010–11 season
- Chairman: Vico Hui
- Manager: Alex McLeish
- Stadium: St Andrew's
- Premier League: 18th (relegated)
- FA Cup: Sixth round
- League Cup: Winners
- Top goalscorer: League: Craig Gardner (8); All: Craig Gardner (10)
- Highest home attendance: 28,270 (vs Newcastle United, 15 February 2011)
- Lowest home attendance: 6,431 (vs Rochdale, League Cup 2nd round, 26 August 2010)
- Average home league attendance: 25,462
Home colours	Away colours	Third colours

The 2010–11 season was Birmingham City's seventh season in the Premier League and their 57th in the top tier of English football. It ran from 1 July 2010 to 30 June 2011. Led by former Scotland national team manager Alex McLeish, the team finished in 18th place in the league, thus being relegated to the Championship for the next season. They reached the sixth round of the FA Cup, losing to Bolton Wanderers, but did win the League Cup, their first major trophy since 1963, by beating favourites Arsenal 2–1 in the final with goals from Nikola Žigić and Obafemi Martins. This win brought the club qualification for the next season's Europa League, their first appearance in any European competition since 1961. The top scorer for the season was Craig Gardner with ten goals in all competitions, of which eight were in the Premier League. McLeish resigned as manager on 12 June 2011, and later joined local rivals Aston Villa on 17 June.

== Pre-season ==
Following Hong Kong-based businessman Carson Yeung's takeover of the club in 2009, Birmingham travelled to China for their 2010–11 pre-season tour. They began with a 3–2 victory against a Hong Kong League XI to win the inaugural Xtep Cup. The winning goal was scored by Garry O'Connor, set up by debutant Nikola Žigić from a Stuart Parnaby cross. In the second match, O'Connor scored the only goal of the game against Beijing Guoan on a dreadful pitch in the Bird's Nest Stadium, and Birmingham then beat Liaoning Whowin with goals from O'Connor and Sebastian Larsson to achieve a hat-trick of victories over Chinese opposition. While in China, club officials and players were involved in promotional activities including attending the launch in Beijing of the 2010–11 kit, supplied for the first time by Chinese manufacturer Xtep.

Back on home soil, Birmingham continued their good form at Pride Park, where they beat a Derby County side featuring former Blues midfielder Robbie Savage. The following day, a Birmingham XI including first-team players rested for the match against Derby drew 2–2 against Northampton Town, conceding a late header from Liam Davis. Birmingham came from two goals down to beat Milton Keynes Dons. James McFadden missed a first-half penalty, but two second-half goals from Cameron Jerome and an 88th-minute winner from O'Connor were enough to see off the League One opposition. Mallorca, the visitors for the only home friendly of the 2010 pre-season, inflicted Birmingham's only defeat with a goal from Emilio Nsue. Craig Gardner played in an unfamiliar right-back position with both Stephen Carr and Stuart Parnaby injured.

Pre-season friendly match details
Date	Opponents	Venue	Result	Score F–A	Scorers	Attendance	Report
18 July 2010	Hong Kong League XI	A	W	3–2	Dann 21', Gardner 74', O'Connor 89'	13,626	
21 July 2010	Beijing Guoan	A	W	1–0	O'Connor 82'	c. 70,000	
24 July 2010	Liaoning Whowin	A	W	2–0	O'Connor 18, Larsson 38'	c. 20,000	
31 July 2010	Derby County	A	W	2–1	Murphy 31', Larsson 46'	4,458	
1 August 2010	Northampton Town	A	D	2–2	Jerome 50', McFadden 68'	1,617	
3 August 2010	MK Dons	A	W	3–2	Jerome (2) 53', 78', O'Connor 88'	5,896	
7 August 2010	Mallorca	H	L	0–1		10,190	

== Premier League ==
=== August ===
Birmingham opened their Premier League campaign with a visit to Sunderland. Garry O'Connor returned to the team after two operations on a chronic hip problem caused him to miss most of the previous season, and goalkeeper Ben Foster made his debut. Captain Stephen Carr fouled Fraizer Campbell to concede a penalty which Darren Bent converted, though the foul appeared to have been committed outside the penalty area. Home captain Lee Cattermole had already avoided punishment for cutting O'Connor's head open with an elbow, but still received two yellow cards and was sent off before half-time. Carr doubled Sunderland's lead with an own goal when an attempted headed clearance looped over Foster. Alex McLeish brought on new signing Nikola Žigić, who "injected a note of panic hitherto undetected" in the home team's defence as Sebastian Larsson's crosses produced goals from Scott Dann and a late equaliser from Liam Ridgewell after a goalmouth scramble.

Žigić marked his first start, at home to Blackburn Rovers, by pulling Christopher Samba's shirt to concede a penalty. After Foster saved Morten Gamst Pedersen's spot-kick – one of many saves in a man-of-the-match performance – Blackburn took the lead. Craig Gardner equalised three minutes later with a tap-in from James McFadden's cushioned volley, and after Nikola Kalinić had hit the post, Gardner scored the winner in the second half with a 25-yard (23 m) shot. Matt Derbyshire, on loan from Olympiacos, made his debut as a second-half substitute.

In an eventful visit to Bolton Wanderers, Birmingham took an early lead after a passing move involving McFadden, Lee Bowyer and Cameron Jerome was finished by Roger Johnson with his first goal for the club. After 36 minutes, Johnson fouled goalkeeper Jussi Jääskeläinen as both competed for a bouncing ball. As the players got to their feet, Jääskeläinen slapped Johnson across the face and was sent off. Five minutes into the second half, McFadden's cross was headed down by Jerome for Gardner to score a scrappy goal at his second attempt. Bolton pulled one back from the penalty spot after Johnson was judged to have fouled Gary Cahill, then with ten minutes left, a foul was given against Barry Ferguson, who had appeared to be squeezed between two Bolton players. From just outside the penalty area, former Birmingham forward Robbie Blake struck a superb free kick to tie the scores. There were late chances for both sides but the score remained 2–2. BBC Sport's reporter suggested that "Birmingham's flickers of poise and invention" were "positive signs" for the season to come. Contract talks with Alex McLeish broke down, leading acting chairman Peter Pannu to deny reports of a "bust-up," and contract talks with Sebastian Larsson resumed.

=== September ===
McFadden and Ferguson were instrumental as Birmingham extended their unbeaten Premier League home record to 17 matches with a goalless draw with Liverpool. Pepe Reina kept the visitors in the game with a succession of fine saves from Jerome, Gardner and others. In the run-up to the visit to West Bromwich Albion, McFadden suffered an anterior cruciate ligament injury which was to keep him out for the season, football consultant Sammy Yu left the club, and McLeish signed a new three-year contract. The home side appeared to have no answer to Jerome's early goal, but Roberto Di Matteo brought Graham Dorrans on at half time, moved Peter Odemwingie from the wing to play up front, and the game was transformed. Odemwingie forced an own goal off Scott Dann and scored a second as Albion won 3–1. Bowyer was substituted to avoid the likelihood of his being sent off, and the player had to apologise after a foul-mouthed exchange with a female supporter.

At home to Wigan Athletic, the unbeaten home run extended to a day short of 12 months. A dull game was enlivened by an altercation between Johnson and Hugo Rodallega for which both were booked, the skills of Charles N'Zogbia and the home supporters' adverse reactions thereto, Jerome missing chances, and Gardner's reckless tackle on Franco Di Santo for which he was sent off.

=== October ===
Having gone 18 top-flight games unbeaten to equal the club record, Birmingham made little impression as Everton won their first match of the season. After Johnson's mistake allowed Yakubu in, Foster took enough pace off his shot to give Ridgewell time to make a goalline clearance, but Johnson then gave Everton the lead when he prodded Leon Osman's cross past Foster, and Tim Cahill's stoppage-time header doubled their advantage.

Two weeks later, Birmingham took the lead through a Žigić header, Arsenal equalised from the penalty spot after Marouane Chamakh went down after minimal contact from Dann, and Chamakh himself scored the winner just after half time. On a day when manager Arsène Wenger used his programme notes to highlight the problem of reckless tackling, England hopeful Jack Wilshere was sent off for a two-footed lunge on Žigić, and Emmanuel Eboué was fortunate to escape a red card for a scissors tackle on Ridgewell.

At home to newly promoted Blackpool, whose attacking style had earned them the best away record in the Premier League, Birmingham played them at their own game, with Alexander Hleb given a free role behind O'Connor and Žigić, and outclassed them 2–0. The goals came from Ridgewell's close-range header after Žigić had headed against the bar, and from Žigić himself after Charlie Adam gave the ball away. The Guardian's reporter suggested that "if City had had more pace and movement up front than was offered by Garry O'Connor and Nikola Zigic, they would have won by five or six."

In an improvement for Birmingham on the last time the clubs met, they had the better of a goalless draw at Aston Villa. The referee missed a clear handball by Nigel Reo-Coker; the same player could have been sent off for "kicking his former team-mate (Gardner) up the backside". Jerome passed to goalkeeper Brad Friedel with Žigić unmarked in the box, and Ashley Young could have won the game for Villa right at the end with a shot that came off the angle of post and bar.

=== November ===
West Ham United co-owner David Gold, formerly Birmingham's co-owner, was banned from attending the clubs' meeting on 6 November for referring to vice-chairman Peter Pannu in the press as "disgusting." The club later accepted Gold's apology. On the field, Birmingham played the diamond formation that had been effective against Blackpool. Apart from the sprinklers suddenly coming on soon after kickoff, the highlight of the first half was Foster's fine save to tip a short-range shot from Carlton Cole onto the post. Early in the second half, West Ham took a two-goal lead and nearly scored a third when Victor Obinna's shot from distance hit the woodwork. After Gardner and Beauseajour replaced Hleb and Keith Fahey, Birmingham came back to draw with a Jerome goal from a Žigić knockdown and a characteristic Ridgewell tap-in when Robert Green failed to gather a Larsson free kick. They could have won it late on when Jerome's shot was deflected on to the crossbar by Danny Gabbidon, and West Ham's penalty appeal against Jean Beausejour for shirt-pulling was turned down.

Birmingham went two goals down at Stoke City, but came back to equalise with a 20-yard (18 m) shot from Fahey and a glancing header by Jerome from a Larsson cross, and Gardner forced two saves from Asmir Begović. Stoke manager Tony Pulis had spoken out before the game about referees' decisions repeatedly going against them; this time, match referee Mark Clattenburg failed to notice a handball in the build-up to Dean Whitehead's winning goal for the home side. The defending improved at Manchester City. The nearest the home side came to scoring was when Carlos Tevez handled the ball into the net and when Foster blocked a James Milner shot and man-of-the-match Stephen Carr cleared the rebound off the line.

Bowyer, replacing the injured Gardner, stole unmarked into the penalty area to meet a Jerome knockdown and take a 17th-minute lead at home to Chelsea. Thereafter, Foster, criticised for his performance for England against France in midweek but now "defiance personified," made numerous saves including one where he "somehow clawed out a Didier Drogba header that was flying in the far corner," as Chelsea failed to score from 32 shots at goal. Away at Fulham, Hleb made a strong run through midfield to the penalty area and played a pinpoint pass which gave the onrushing Larsson time to set himself and pass the ball into the net for his first goal of the season. After Clint Dempsey arguably climbed on Fahey's shoulders to head the equaliser, Birmingham came close to regaining the lead when Dann's header from a Larsson cross hit the bar, but lost Hleb to a hamstring injury.

=== December ===
Gardner was central to Birmingham achieving a draw at home to Tottenham Hotspur. Sébastien Bassong scored after Foster failed to deal with Gareth Bale's free kick, but the introduction of Žigić, a hero after scoring the winner against Aston Villa in the League Cup quarter-final in the week, made the difference. Ridgewell's powerful shot was blocked by Heurelho Gomes' groin, before Johnson's long ball found Žigić, who headed into the penalty area for Gardner to head home after a well-timed run. Speaking after the 1–0 defeat at Wolverhampton Wanderers, McLeish said, "We didn't turn up at all for the first 60 minutes. We were outfought and then had a go. We need to start games the way we finish them."

The visit of Newcastle United on 18 December was a late postponement because of heavy snowfall, and the Boxing Day trip to Everton was called off on the morning of the match after frozen pipes within Goodison Park burst. In Birmingham's last match of 2010, Manchester United scored after an hour through Dimitar Berbatov, but in the 89th minute, Žigić appeared to foul Rio Ferdinand as he controlled Johnson's cross with his arm, touching it on to Bowyer who equalised from an arguably offside position.

=== January ===
Birmingham began the new year outplayed by Arsenal by three goals to nil. Television replays highlighted incidents, unnoticed by the referee, in which Bowyer stamped on Bacary Sagna and seemed to rake his studs down the same player's achilles. Suggestions in the media that he might be banned for six matches prompted Alex McLeish to argue that the football authorities were not treating all clubs equally when using television evidence. Bowyer received the standard three-match ban for violent conduct.

Birmingham went to Blackpool as the only Premier League team without an away win. After Blackpool lost at St Andrew's in October, manager Ian Holloway had promised that if Birmingham used the same attacking tactics when they came to Bloomfield Road, his players would know how to counter them. He was nearly right. Hleb, returning from injury to play behind Jerome and Matt Derbyshire, scored the opening goal after being gifted the ball in the penalty area. Former Birmingham player DJ Campbell equalised, both sides hit the woodwork, the visitors were particularly profligate in front of goal, but Dann scored an 89th-minute winner with a poacher's finish from Johnson's knock-down.

Without Dann, whose hamstring injury sustained in the League Cup first leg was to keep him out for the rest of the season, Ridgewell moved to centre back, David Murphy started at left back, and loanee David Bentley made his debut in the Sunday lunchtime kickoff against Aston Villa. Both teams had chances to win but the 1–1 draw left both teams just outside the relegation zone. The attendance of 22,287 was the lowest for Premier League matches between the clubs. With the League Cup semi-final four days later, Birmingham gave Jordon Mutch a League debut and rested Gardner, Jerome and Larsson as they visited Manchester United. They lost 5–0.

=== February ===
Martin Jiránek made his Premier League debut at home to Manchester City in a match moved to the Wednesday at short notice because City's FA Cup-tie was being televised the previous Sunday. City's Micah Richards was knocked unconscious in collision with teammate Nigel de Jong, and manager Roberto Mancini accused Kevin Phillips of diving to earn the penalty from which Gardner gave Birmingham what BBC Sport's reporter termed a "deserved equaliser." Returning to West Ham United having beaten them to reach the League Cup final, Birmingham ensured that it would be they and not the hosts who escaped from the relegation places when Žigić scored the only goal of the game midway through the second half.

Obafemi Martins had a quiet debut at home to Stoke City. A dull match was goalless until stoppage time, when Begović fumbled Bentley's shot, Jerome robbed him of the ball, flicked it up from the byline and Žigić outjumped John Carew and headed the winner to give Birmingham their first consecutive Premier League wins in almost a year. McLeish suggested that fatigue might be a factor in Birmingham's "flat" performance three days later as they lost 2–0 at home to Newcastle United to leave themselves in 14th place, three points above the relegation zone.

=== March ===
Beausejour scored his first Premier League goal in a losing cause at home to West Bromwich Albion, in Birmingham's first league match after the League Cup win. His second, a header from Mutch's cross, took the lead at Everton, but the match was drawn. In the second half, referee Peter Walton had taken the field without his yellow card, so had to act out issuing a caution to Mutch using an imaginary card. Having exited the relegation zone the previous week, Birmingham conceded a stoppage-time goal at Wigan Athletic to find themselves back in it. Ridgewell scored early on from what appeared to be an offside position, and Jiránek left the field soon afterwards with an injury, but Wigan equalised through Tom Cleverley before Maynor Figueroa scored the winner from 20 yards (18 m). The defeat left them in 19th place, though if they won their game in hand, the three points would take them to a mid-table 13th.

=== April ===
After goals by Phillips from a Larsson corner and by Gardner after a one-two with Jerome, a Larsson goal disallowed for offside and a Johnson volley drawing a good save from Jääskeläinen, Birmingham should have been comfortable. However, Johan Elmander scored an excellent volleyed goal from distance, Bolton Wanderers took heart, and only fine goalkeeping from Foster kept the visitors at bay. Bowyer's tap-in from Jerome's pass took the lead at Blackburn Rovers, and shortly before half-time, Johnson received lengthy treatment for a head injury before leaving the pitch for further attention. Seven minutes into stoppage time, he returned to the field, apparently distracting defensive partner Ridgewell who allowed Junior Hoilett to steal the ball and take it past Foster to equalise. Curtis Davies replaced Johnson for the second half, the first time in nearly two seasons with the club that Johnson had been substituted.

A 2–0 defeat of Sunderland, with goals from Larsson and Gardner, gave Birmingham seven points from the last three games. With six games left to play, they were in 14th place, five points above the relegation zone with a game in hand on most teams below them, albeit with some difficult fixtures to come. Chelsea had little difficulty in beating Birmingham 3–1, the visitors' goal coming from the penalty spot; Larsson and Gardner had a lengthy discussion as to who should take the kick, eventually won by the former. McLeish confirmed afterwards that Gardner would be the designated penalty-taker in future. Maxi Rodríguez, in the starting eleven only because Andy Carroll was injured, scored a hat-trick as Foster sustained an injury trying to prevent Liverpool's second goal and had to be replaced by Colin Doyle, making his first Premier League appearance since 2007.

=== May ===
Bentley left the ground "in a huff" when not included in the matchday squad for the home game with Wolverhampton Wanderers. Wolves took an early lead from the penalty spot before Michael Mancienne failed to deal with Foster's clearance. Larsson, having run the length of the field, collected the loose ball and clipped it past the goalkeeper. In an aggressive game, Gardner was booked after an altercation with Jamie O'Hara, and after suffering a wild tackle by Richard Stearman, who went unpunished, he "went down under pressure" from Jody Craddock and received a second yellow card for simulation. His second dismissal of the season meant he would miss two of the club's last three games. Birmingham's ten men held on for the draw, which left them four points clear of the relegation zone.

Foster kept Birmingham in the game at Newcastle United until Ridgewell was sent off for handling the ball on the goalline. Newcastle scored the resultant penalty, doubled their lead from Steven Taylor's header, then Bowyer pulled a goal back just before half-time when Jerome's shot was parried. Larsson missed a clear chance to equalise, shooting over the bar after Tim Krul fumbled Beausejour's cross, but the home side also had chances to extend their lead.

With Jerome injured, Phillips and Derbyshire started at home to Fulham and youngster Akwasi Asante was the only forward among the substitutes. The players seemed nervous, made little impression, were unable to deal with the power of Brede Hangeland, who scored both Fulham goals, and the only serious chance came when Jiránek turned Parnaby's cross towards goal with his chest. Birmingham finished the match with only ten men, after losing Hleb, Bowyer, Parnaby and Jiránek to injury, and in 17th place in the league, ahead of Blackpool and Wigan Athletic only on goal difference after they and Wolves all won.

Birmingham went into their final match, away to Tottenham Hotspur, as one of five teams still at risk of relegation. Doing no worse than Blackpool and Wigan would keep them safe, and there were more complicated calculations depending on the result of the match between Blackburn and Wolves. Jerome, who had undergone specialist treatment all week on his injured heel, was able to start the game, and Davies was an excellent replacement for Jiránek. Roman Pavlyuchenko put Tottenham one up early in the second half, but Gardner's 79th-minute equaliser put his team ahead of Wolves and safe. With stoppage time approaching, Wolves scored again to leave Birmingham needing another goal. The message appeared to take time getting through to the players, but they eventually threw everyone forward, leaving themselves open at the back, and Pavlyuchenko scored a spectacular winner to ensure fifth place and Europa League qualification. Birmingham finished 18th, and were relegated.

=== Match details ===
Match details, including date, result, venue, lineups, league positions and goal times (apart from for goals scored in stoppage time) are sourced to 11v11.com.
General source (match reports):

Match content not verifiable from these sources is referenced individually. Scorelines list Birmingham's score first.

Premier League match details
Date	League position	Opponents	Venue	Result	Score	Scorers	Attendance	Refs
14 August 2010	6th	Sunderland	A	D	2–2	Dann 77', Ridgewell 88'	38,390	
21 August 2010	4th	Blackburn Rovers	H	W	2–1	Gardner (2) 57', 71'	21,394	
29 August 2010	6th	Bolton Wanderers	A	D	2–2	Johnson 4', Gardner 50'	18,139	
12 September 2010	5th	Liverpool	H	D	0–0		27,333	
18 September 2010	11th	West Bromwich Albion	A	L	1–3	Jerome 15'	23,062	
25 September 2010	11th	Wigan Athletic	H	D	0–0		22,168	
2 October 2010	15th	Everton	H	L	0–2		23,138	
16 October 2010	16th	Arsenal	A	L	1–2	Žigić 33'	60,070	
23 October 2010	12th	Blackpool	H	W	2–0	Ridgewell 36', Žigić 56'	26,850	
31 October 2010	14th	Aston Villa	A	D	0–0		40,688	
6 November 2010	14th	West Ham United	H	D	2–2	Jerome 64', Ridgewell 73'	26,474	
9 November 2010	17th	Stoke City	A	L	2–3	Fahey 74', Jerome 76'	26,381	
13 November 2010	18th	Manchester City	A	D	0–0		44,321	
20 November 2010	13th	Chelsea	H	W	1–0	Bowyer 17'	24,357	
27 November 2010	14th	Fulham	A	D	1–1	Larsson 20'	24,391	
4 December 2010	14th	Tottenham Hotspur	H	D	1–1	Gardner 81'	25,770	
12 December 2010	16th	Wolverhampton Wanderers	A	L	0–1		25,150	
28 December 2010	16th	Manchester United	H	D	1–1	Bowyer 89'	28,242	
1 January 2011	19th	Arsenal	H	L	0–3		24,341	
4 January 2011	15th	Blackpool	A	W	2–1	Hleb 24', Dann 89'	14,550	
16 January 2011	16th	Aston Villa	H	D	1–1	Johnson 49'	22,287	
22 January 2011	17th	Manchester United	A	L	0–5		75,326	
2 February 2011	17th	Manchester City	H	D	2–2	Žigić 23', Gardner 77' pen.	24,379	
6 February 2011	16th	West Ham United	A	W	1–0	Žigić 65'	32,927	
12 February 2011	14th	Stoke City	H	W	1–0	Žigić 90+3'	23,660	
15 February 2011	14th	Newcastle United	H	L	0–2		28,270	
5 March 2011	18th	West Bromwich Albion	H	L	1–3	Beausejour 48'	27,013	
9 March 2011	17th	Everton	A	D	1–1	Beausejour 17'	33,974	
19 March 2011	19th	Wigan Athletic	A	L	1–2	Ridgewell 6'	16,421	
2 April 2011	15th	Bolton Wanderers	H	W	2–1	Phillips 4', Gardner 59'	26,142	
9 April 2011	15th	Blackburn Rovers	A	D	1–1	Bowyer 32'	28,426	
16 April 2011	14th	Sunderland	H	W	2–0	Larsson 41', Gardner 66'	28,108	
20 April 2011	15th	Chelsea	A	L	1–3	Larsson 66' pen.	40,848	
23 April 2011	15th	Liverpool	A	L	0–5		44,734	
1 May 2011	15th	Wolverhampton Wanderers	H	D	1–1	Larsson 27'	26,072	
7 May 2011	16th	Newcastle United	A	L	1–2	Bowyer 45'	47,409	
15 May 2011	17th	Fulham	H	L	0–2		27,759	
22 May 2011	18th	Tottenham Hotspur	A	L	1–2	Gardner 79'	36,119	

=== League table ===
Pos	Team	Pld	W	D	L	GF	GA	GD	Pts	Qualification or relegation
16	Wigan Athletic	38	9	15	14	40	61	−21	42	
17	Wolverhampton Wanderers	38	11	7	20	46	66	−20	40	
18	Birmingham City (R)	38	8	15	15	37	58	−21	39	Qualification for the Europa League play-off round and relegation to Football League Championship (Note: Birmingham City qualified for the play-off round of the Europa League after winning the League Cup, worth a third qualification round spot, and subsequently being moved up a round due to the outcome of the FA Cup final.)
19	Blackpool (R)	38	10	9	19	55	78	−23	39	Relegation to Football League Championship
20	West Ham United (R)	38	7	12	19	43	70	−27	33	Relegation to Football League Championship

Rules for classification: 1) points; 2) goal difference; 3) number of goals scored.
(R) Relegated

=== Results summary ===
Overall								Home						Away					
Pld	W	D	L	GF	GA	GD	Pts	W	D	L	GF	GA	GD	W	D	L	GF	GA	GD
38	8	15	15	37	58	−21	39	6	8	5	19	22	−3	2	7	10	18	36	−18

Last updated: end of season.

== FA Cup ==
Birmingham were drawn away against Millwall for their opening match in the 2010–11 FA Cup. With the League Cup semi-final scheduled for three days later, McLeish made seven changes from the side that had beaten Blackpool in midweek, including a first start for Jordon Mutch after his successful loan spell at Watford. They might have expected more competition from a team just outside the play-off positions in the Championship, but two goals from Derbyshire, a precise free kick from Murphy, and a powerful header by Jerome shortly after coming on a late substitute gave them a 4–0 lead. Had Millwall's finishing been better – Steve Morison failed to take an early chance when through on goalkeeper Maik Taylor, James Henry had an attempt disallowed for offside, and Taylor saved Morison's weak penalty – they might well have achieved more than Danny Schofield's consolation.

In the fourth round, Birmingham made nine changes from the eleven that had started the League Cup semi-final three days before. After Žigić headed wide and Phillips' header was deflected onto the crossbar, they went two goals down at home to mid-table Championship club Coventry City. Bentley's 25-yard (23 m) shot was too hot for Keiren Westwood and went in off the underside of the bar, then in the second half Parnaby scored his first senior goal for nearly five years after Hleb had drawn Westwood out of goal. After 73 minutes, Phillips volleyed in a ball from Beausejour for the winner.

A stronger Birmingham team than that selected in previous rounds enjoyed a comfortable win against Sheffield Wednesday of League One in the fifth round. Goals from Beausejour and Martins, his first for the club, were both set up by Hleb before he left the field on a stretcher, the victim of a late tackle by James O'Connor. Murphy scored a third from close range to take Birmingham into the quarter-finals for the second year running. Roger Johnson punched the dug-out after he was substituted with half an hour remaining, but McLeish said he took the sensible course, to avoid the risk of a second yellow card which would mean Johnson missing the approaching League Cup final.

Bolton Wanderers had to take the lead three times to eliminate a Birmingham side so short of fit players that they started the 19-year-old Mutch in central midfield, gave a squad number to 17-year-old defender Alpaslan Öztürk, and were still unable to name a full complement of seven substitutes. Johan Elmander scored for Bolton after 21 minutes, and within the next ten minutes Birmingham had lost Ferguson and Jiránek to injury. Jerome took advantage of a defensive error to equalise with a tidy finish from 16 yards (15 m), and each side made penalty appeals that were correctly turned down. Bolton regained the lead from the penalty spot when Curtis Davies fouled Kevin Davies before Phillips first hit the post, then from a flick-on by the 17-year-old Nathan Redmond, "somehow Phillips swivelled, scissor-kicking a volley from outside the area over the head of Jaaskelainen and in." McLeish brought on striker Derbyshire in place of Murphy and went for the win, but in stoppage time, Kevin Davies headed across goal for Lee Chung-yong to take the visitors into the semi-finals.

Scorelines list Birmingham's score first.

FA Cup match details
Round	Date	Opponents	Venue	Result	Score	Scorers	Attendance	Report
Third round	8 January 2011	Millwall	A	W	4–1	Derbyshire (2) 17', 45', Murphy 27', Jerome 72'	9,841	
Fourth round	29 January 2011	Coventry City	H	W	3–2	Bentley 35', Parnaby 67', Phillips 73'	16,669	
Fifth round	9 February 2011	Sheffield Wednesday	H	W	3–0	Beausejour 6', Martins 17', Murphy 53'	14,607	
Sixth round	12 March 2011	Bolton Wanderers	H	L	2–3	Jerome 38', Phillips 80'	23,699	

== League Cup ==
Birmingham began their League Cup campaign in the second round, drawn at home to Rochdale of League One in the first competitive meeting between the clubs. They made eight changes to the previous starting eleven, giving debuts to Enric Vallès and, from the substitutes' bench, Nathan Redmond, at 16 years 173 days the club's second-youngest first-team debutant after Trevor Francis. A goal down after 26 minutes, Birmingham equalised two minutes later through a "harsh" penalty scored by McFadden, as Marcus Holness was adjudged to have fouled Derbyshire. Goals followed from Murphy, playing his first game since breaking his kneecap in April 2009, and Derbyshire, but a second Rochdale goal made for a tense last quarter of an hour.

Third-round opponents Milton Keynes Dons proved less of an obstacle. Birmingham made nine changes from their previous match, including a debut for Jiránek, a first start for Beausejour, and first games of the season for Phillips and Parnaby. Hleb, making his home debut, and Žigić each scored their first goal for the club and substitute Gardner made the score 3–0 in a four-minute spell midway through the first half. Though MK Dons scored late on, Birmingham's victory was comfortable.

Brentford, Birmingham's third consecutive visitors from League One, had beaten Premier League Everton on penalties in the third round. Sam Wood gave them the lead with a volley after 68 minutes, goalkeeper Richard Lee produced a fine save to deny Gardner's curling shot, and after Žigić headed over the bar with four minutes of normal time remaining, it seemed as though they were going to repeat the upset. But after two minutes of stoppage time, Ridgewell squared the ball to Phillips who scored with a low shot. In extra time, Lee saved a header from Žigić, and the tie went to penalties. On Brentford's last attempt before sudden death, Craig Woodman hit the ball straight at Taylor, who was able to deflect it onto the bar, so Birmingham scraped through to the fifth round.

The quarter-final pitted Birmingham against local rivals Aston Villa, again at home. West Midlands Police had been sufficiently concerned about the potential for trouble and possible adverse effects on England's World Cup bid that they made an unsuccessful request for a change of date and had four times the usual number of officers on duty. Larsson opened the scoring with a penalty after Richard Dunne fouled Bowyer, then Gabriel Agbonlahor equalised for Villa on the break after Žigić had an apparently valid goal disallowed. Jerome shot wide when one-on-one with goalkeeper Brad Friedel, and Foster saved well from Ashley Young after parrying a shot from Agbonlahor, but neither side could make the breakthrough until, on 86 minutes, Žigić scrambled home a shot deflected off Luke Young. At the end of the match, large numbers of Birmingham fans invaded the pitch and were separated from the visiting support by riot police. Missiles, including seats and a flare, believed by police to have originated in the visitors' section, were thrown back and forth, and the violence continued outside the ground.

Birmingham were drawn against West Ham United in the two-legged semi-final. In the first leg, at Upton Park, West Ham had much the best of the first half, and took a deserved lead when Mark Noble scored from a tight angle with Foster's view at the near post obscured by Dann. Dann sustained an injury just before half-time which was to keep him out for the rest of the season. Early in the second half, Birmingham equalised through Ridgewell's header from a corner, then took a man advantage when Victor Obinna was sent off for kicking Larsson in the groin. Even after a penalty was denied when Ferguson was knocked flying by Matthew Upson, it looked as Birmingham would go on to win, but goalkeeper Foster blundered when he allowed a weak shot from Carlton Cole to go through him. West Ham increased their lead to 3–1 on aggregate in the first half of the second leg when Cole collected a throw-in and shot past Foster from 25 yards (23 m). The half-time introduction of Žigić put pressure on West Ham's defence. A penalty appeal against Wayne Bridge for handball was rejected, but from the resultant corner, Bowyer tied the scores on the night, and prolonged pressure led to Johnson's 79th-minute headed goal which tied the scores overall. With the last play of normal time, Gardner's shot was touched onto the post by Green, and the game went into extra time. Four minutes later, Gardner repeated the shot with enough power and accuracy to beat Green and give Birmingham the 4–3 aggregate lead which took them into the final.

League Cup match details
Round	Date	Opponents	Venue	Result	Score F–A	Scorers	Attendance	Report
Second round	26 August 2010	Rochdale	H	W	3–2	McFadden 28' pen., Murphy 48', Derbyshire 53'	6,431	
Third round	21 September 2010	MK Dons	H	W	3–1	Hleb 24', Žigić 26', Gardner 28'	9,450	
Fourth round	19 October 2010	Brentford	H	W	1–1 a.e.t. 4–3 pens.	Phillips 90+2'; Phillips, Gardner, Dann, Carr.	15,166	
Fifth round	1 December 2010	Aston Villa	H	W	2–1	Larsson 12' pen., Žigić 84'	27,679	
Semi-final first leg	11 January 2011	West Ham United	A	L	1–2	Ridgewell 56'	29,034	
Semi-final second leg	26 January 2011	West Ham United	H	W	3–1 a.e.t. 4–3 agg.	Bowyer 59', Johnson 79', Gardner 94'	27,519	

=== Final ===
Going into the final, media focus centred on the competition being the first element of Arsenal's potential quadruple, their failure to win a trophy for six years, and concerns over the fitness of their captain Cesc Fàbregas. Pundits and bookmakers were in agreement that there could be only one winner, though Cameron Jerome suggested that being overwhelming favourites would put extra pressure on Arsenal, and that if they had a weakness, it lay with their defence.

To counteract Arsenal's perceived strength, their passing ability in midfield, McLeish set his side out in a 4–5–1 formation with three defensive midfielders – Ferguson covering the centre backs and Gardner and Bowyer closing opponents down and chasing – and wide players Fahey and Larsson supporting the tall but less mobile Žigić. In the first two minutes, Bowyer ran on to a through ball from Žigić and was brought down by goalkeeper Wojciech Szczęsny for what appeared to be a penalty and a red card. Arsenal were relieved to see the linesman raise his flag for offside, though television replays showed his decision to have been wrong. With nearly half an hour gone, Larsson's corner seemed to confuse the Arsenal centre backs. Roger Johnson headed the ball towards goal and Žigić outjumped his opponents to head home. Towards half time, Jack Wilshere hit the crossbar, and when Birmingham failed to clear, Andrey Arshavin crossed for Robin van Persie to direct an aerial volley past Foster.

Early in the second half, Beausejour replaced Gardner. A few minutes later he set up Fahey, whose poor shot hit teammate Žigić. The ball rebounded back to Fahey who reacted quickly to volley it goalwards, only for it to strike the inside of the post with Szczęsny beaten and bounce across the goal to safety. Van Persie, who had hurt himself in the act of scoring, was struggling by the middle of the second half and was replaced by former Birmingham loanee Nicklas Bendtner. Towards the end of normal time, Birmingham were tiring; Johnson remained on the field after receiving treatment for an injury that restricted his movement, Jiránek was limping, and the defence as a whole had hardly trained in the week leading up to the game. But it was that defence, and particularly Foster, who won the man of the match award for the second time in three years, who prevented Arsenal from taking advantage.

With seven minutes left of normal time, Obafemi Martins replaced Fahey for his League Cup debut. After 89 minutes, Foster cleared the ball long, Žigić touched it on, and when Laurent Koscielny attempted to play it, distracting Szczęsny from making what should have been a straightforward gather, the ball fell loose to Martins in front of goal. He tapped it into an empty net for what he called "the easiest goal I've ever scored in my career", and celebrated with his trademark somersaults, although not the ten he had promised. For the remaining few minutes, Birmingham defended stoutly, but Martins had a fine chance to increase the lead when he took the ball past Johan Djourou and the goalkeeper but found himself with too narrow a shooting angle. Jerome, who had come on during stoppage time, and Ferguson were both booked for time-wasting as Birmingham held on to win their first major trophy for nearly 50 years.

27 February 2011 Final	Arsenal	1–2	Birmingham City	Wembley Stadium, London
16:00	Van Persie 39'		Žigić 28'; Martins 89'	Attendance: 88,851; Referee: Mike Dean
Note: Birmingham City qualify for UEFA Europa League

== Transfers ==
At the end of the 2009–10 season, Birmingham released first-team players Gary McSheffrey, Grégory Vignal, Franck Queudrue and Lee Carsley, and chose not to sign loanee Christian Benítez on a permanent basis. Goalkeeper Joe Hart returned to parent club Manchester City, to be replaced by Birmingham's first signing of the new season, Manchester United's Ben Foster, who joined for an estimated initial fee of £4 million. Next to arrive was striker Nikola Žigić, who signed from Valencia shortly before joining up with the Serbia national team at the World Cup. After young Spanish midfielder Enric Vallès joined on a one-year contract and Matt Derbyshire returned to England on loan from Olympiacos, there were no more signings until transfer deadline day, when Barcelona midfielder Alexander Hleb arrived on a season-long loan and Chilean winger Jean Beausejour and Spartak Moscow captain and defender Martin Jiránek agreed permanent deals. Jordon Mutch joined Championship club Watford on an initial one-month loan, later extended until January 2011, and several fringe players left on loan. Garry O'Connor had two separate loan spells at Barnsley, initially to regain match fitness after injury, but was released in December to join that club on a permanent contract.

In the January transfer window, Míchel joined AEK Athens on loan until the end of the season. League Two club Burton Albion intended to take 16-year-old winger Nathan Redmond on loan, but the move fell foul of regulations forbidding first-year scholars to sign on loan for League clubs. Tottenham Hotspur winger David Bentley and Nigerian international striker Obafemi Martins came in on loan, and Aston Villa defender Curtis Davies signed a three-and-a-half-year deal for an estimated £3.5M fee. Sebastian Larsson, whose contract was due to expire at the end of the season, was given permission to speak to Newcastle United about a possible transfer, but personal terms were not agreed, and Kevin Phillips was told he could leave if "the right offer" were received.

Among those players released at the end of the season when their contracts expired were first-teamers Larsson, Phillips, Jiránek, Lee Bowyer, Maik Taylor and Stuart Parnaby and fringe players Marcus Bent, Jay O'Shea, Dan Preston and Robin Shroot. All the loanees returned to their owning clubs.

=== In ===
Date	Player	Club†	Fee	Ref
19 May 2010	Ben Foster	Manchester United	Undisclosed	
26 May 2010	Nikola Žigić	Valencia	Undisclosed	
1 July 2010	Enric Vallès	(NAC Breda)	Free	
31 August 2010	Martin Jiránek	Spartak Moscow	Undisclosed	
31 August 2010	Jean Beausejour	Club América	Undisclosed	
28 January 2011	Curtis Davies	Aston Villa	Undisclosed	

† Brackets round club names indicate the player's contract with that club had expired before he joined Birmingham.

=== Out ===
Date	Player	Fee	Joined†	Ref
12 December 2010	Garry O'Connor	Released	(Barnsley)	
30 June 2011	Marcus Bent	Released	(Mitra Kukar)	
30 June 2011	Lee Bowyer	Released	(Ipswich Town)	
30 June 2011	Martin Jiránek	Released	(Terek Grozny)	
30 June 2011	Sebastian Larsson	Released	(Sunderland)	
30 June 2011	James McFadden	Released	(Everton)	
30 June 2011	Stuart Parnaby	Released	Middlesbrough	
30 June 2011	Kevin Phillips	Released	(Blackpool)	
30 June 2011	Maik Taylor	Released	(Leeds United)	
30 June 2011	Mitch McPike	Released		
30 June 2011	Jay O'Shea	Released	(Milton Keynes Dons)	
30 June 2011	Dan Preston	Released	(AFC Telford United)	
30 June 2011	Luke Rowe	Released	(Team Wellington)	
30 June 2011	Robin Shroot	Released	(Stevenage)	

† Brackets round a club denote the player joined that club after his Birmingham City contract expired.

=== Loan in ===
Date	Player	Club	Return	Ref
16 August 2010	Matt Derbyshire	Olympiacos	End of season	
31 August 2010	Alexander Hleb	Barcelona	End of season	
12 January 2011	David Bentley	Tottenham Hotspur	End of season	
31 January 2011	Obafemi Martins	Rubin Kazan	End of season	

=== Loan out ===
Date	Player	Club	Return	Ref
1 August 2010	Jordon Mutch	Watford	January 2011	
5 August 2010	Jake Jervis	Notts County	4 January 2011	
7 August 2010	Robin Shroot	Cheltenham Town	January 2011	
20 August 2010	Luke Hubbins	Notts County	January 2011	
31 August 2010	Marcus Bent	Wolverhampton Wanderers	4 January 2011	
10 September 2010	Garry O'Connor	Barnsley	One month	
26 October 2010	Jay O'Shea	Stevenage	16 January 2011	
8 November 2010	Garry O'Connor	Barnsley	One month	
26 November 2010	Mitch McPike	Kidderminster Harriers	One month	
18 January 2011	Marcus Bent	Sheffield United	16 April 2011	
20 January 2011	Jay O'Shea	Port Vale	One month	
20 January 2011	Nathan Redmond	Burton Albion	31 January 2011	
21 January 2011	Míchel	AEK Athens	End of season	
21 January 2011	Jake Jervis	Hereford United	One month	
28 January 2011	Dan Preston	Hereford United	13 April 2011	

== Appearances and goals ==
No.	Pos.	Nat.	Name	League		FA Cup		League Cup		Total		Discipline	
No.	Pos.	Nat.	Name	Apps	Goals	Apps	Goals	Apps	Goals	Apps	Goals	A yellow rectangular card	A red rectangular card
1	GK	NIR	Maik Taylor	0	0	1	0	3	0	4	0	0	0
2	DF	IRE	Stephen Carr	38	0	1	0	5	0	44	0	5	0
3	DF	ENG	David Murphy	10	0	4	2	5	1	19	3	2	0
4	MF	ENG	Lee Bowyer	29	4	1	0	5	1	36	5	7	0
5	DF	ENG	Roger Johnson	38	2	1	0	6	1	45	3	6	0
6	DF	ENG	Liam Ridgewell	36	4	2	0	5	1	43	5	6	1
7	MF	SWE	Sebastian Larsson	35	4	1	0	5	1	41	5	6	0
8	MF	ENG	Craig Gardner	29	8	2	0	6	2	37	10	7	2
9	FW	ENG	Kevin Phillips	14	1	4	2	2	1	20	4	0	0
10	FW	ENG	Cameron Jerome	34	3	4	2	4	0	42	5	3	0
11	FW	SCO	Garry O'Connor	3	0	0	0	2	0	5	0	0	0
11	MF	ENG	David Bentley	13	0	2	1	0	0	15	1	0	0
12	MF	SCO	Barry Ferguson	35	0	1	0	5	0	41	0	3	0
13	GK	IRE	Colin Doyle	1	0	2	0	0	0	3	0	0	0
14	FW	ENG	Matt Derbyshire	13	0	2	2	5	1	20	3	1	0
15	DF	ENG	Scott Dann	20	2	1	0	4	0	25	2	5	0
16	FW	SCO	James McFadden	4	0	0	0	1	1	5	1	0	0
17	MF	ESP	Míchel	0	0	0	0	3	0	3	0	0	0
17	FW	NGA	Obafemi Martins	4	0	1	1	1	1	6	2	0	0
18	MF	IRE	Keith Fahey	24	1	3	0	5	0	32	1	2	0
19	FW	SRB	Nikola Žigić	25	5	2	0	7	3	34	8	4	0
20	MF	ESP	Enric Vallès	0	0	0	0	2	0	2	0	0	0
21	DF	ENG	Stuart Parnaby	5	0	4	1	2	0	11	1	1	0
22	MF	BLR	Alexander Hleb	19	1	3	0	2	1	24	2	0	0
23	FW	CHI	Jean Beausejour	17	2	4	1	4	0	25	3	0	0
24	MF	IRE	Jay O'Shea	0	0	0	0	0	0	0	0	0	0
25	MF	ENG	Jordon Mutch	3	0	3	0	0	0	6	0	1	0
26	GK	ENG	Ben Foster	38	0	1	0	4	0	43	0	3	0
27	MF	ENG	Nathan Redmond	0	0	1	0	2	0	3	0	0	0
28	DF	CZE	Martin Jiránek	10	0	3	0	3	0	16	0	2	0
29	FW	ENG	Marcus Bent	0	0	0	0	0	0	0	0	0	0
30	FW	NED	Akwasi Asante	0	0	0	0	0	0	0	0	0	0
31	DF	SCO	Fraser Kerr	0	0	0	0	0	0	0	0	0	0
32	DF	ENG	Curtis Davies	6	0	1	0	0	0	7	0	1	0
33	DF	BEL	Alpaslan Öztürk	0	0	0	0	0	0	0	0	0	0
34	GK	ENG	Jack Butland	0	0	0	0	0	0	0	0	0	0
