= 2003–04 Wycombe Wanderers F.C. season =

Wycombe Wanderers
2003–04 season
- Chairman: Ivor Beeks
- Manager: Lawrie Sanchez; Tony Adams
- Stadium: Adams Park
- Second Division: 24th (relegated)
- FA Cup: Second round
- League Cup: Second round
- Football League Trophy: Third round

The 2003–04 season was Wycombe Wanderers's 116th season of competitive association football, and tenth consecutive season in the Football League Second Division. They finished 24th of 24 and were relegated to the newly formed Football League Two. They also competed in the FA Cup, Football League Cup and Football League Trophy.

== Season summary ==
Manager Lawrie Sanchez was sacked by the club on 30 September 2003, with Tony Adams appointed as his successor on 5 November 2003. They finished bottom on 37 points.

== Competitions ==
=== Football League Second Division ===
==== League table ====
Pos	Team	Pld	W	D	L	GF	GA	GD	Pts	Promotion or relegation
20	Chesterfield	46	12	15	19	49	71	−22	51	
21	Grimsby Town (R)	46	13	11	22	55	81	−26	50	Relegation to Football League Two
22	Rushden & Diamonds (R)	46	13	9	24	60	74	−14	48	Relegation to Football League Two
23	Notts County (R)	46	10	12	24	50	78	−28	42	Relegation to Football League Two
24	Wycombe Wanderers (R)	46	6	19	21	50	75	−25	37	Relegation to Football League Two

Rules for classification: In the Football League goals scored (GF) takes precedence over goal difference (GD).
(R) Relegated

=== FA Cup ===
Win	Draw	Loss

Round	Date	Opponent	Venue	Result (Note: Wycombe Wanderers' score shown first)	Scorers	Attendance	Ref.
First round	8 November 2003	Swindon Town	Home	4–1	Thomson 44', Currie 64', 85', McSporran 87'	4,738	
Second round	5 December 2003	Mansfield Town	Home	1–1	Holligan 53'	3,212	
Second round replay	16 December 2003	Mansfield Town	Away	2–3	McSporran 56', 59'	5,512	

=== Football League Cup ===
Win	Draw	Loss

Round	Date	Opponent	Venue	Result	Scorers	Attendance	Ref.
First round	12 August 2003	Wimbledon	Home	2–0	Harris 3', 57'	1,986	
Second round	23 September 2003	Aston Villa	Home	0–5	—	6,072	

=== Football League Trophy ===
Win	Draw	Loss

Round	Date	Opponent	Venue	Result	Scorers	Attendance	Ref.
First round	14 October 2003	Cambridge United	Home	1–0	Branston 20'	977	
Second round	4 November 2003	Plymouth Argyle	Away	2–2 (a.e.t.); 4–2 pens.	McSporran 8', 15'	4,298	
Third round	9 December 2003	Colchester United	Home	2–3 (a.e.t.)	Thomson 22', Johnson 69'	1,873	
