= Keith Fahey =

Irish former footballer (born 1983)

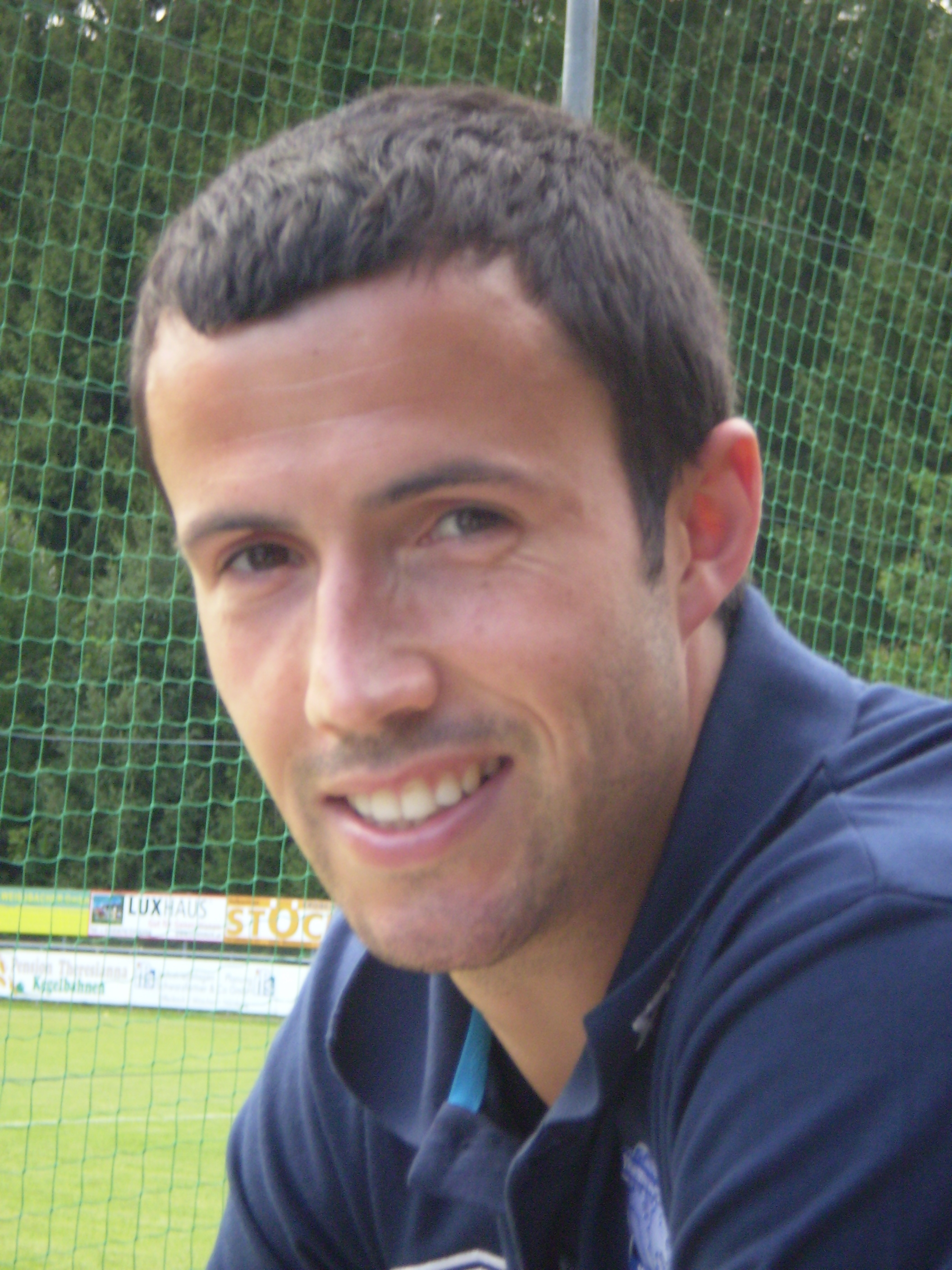
- Fahey with Birmingham City in 2009

Personal information
- Full name: Keith Declan Fahey
- Date of birth: 15 January 1983 (age 43)
- Place of birth: Dublin, Ireland
- Height: 5 ft 10 in (1.78 m)
- Position: Midfielder

Youth career
- 1988–1995: Tymon Bawn
- 1995–1998: Cherry Orchard
- 1998–2000: Arsenal
- 2000–2002: Aston Villa

Senior career*
Years	Team	Apps	(Gls)
2002–2003	Aston Villa	0	(0)
2003	Bluebell United	0	(0)
2003–2005	St Patrick's Athletic	75	(11)
2005–2006	Drogheda United	22	(2)
2006–2008	St Patrick's Athletic	77	(12)
2009–2013	Birmingham City	121	(9)
2014	St Patrick's Athletic	26	(2)
2015	Shamrock Rovers	12	(0)
2017	Bluebell United	1	(0)
Total		334	(36)

International career
1999–2000	Republic of Ireland U16	11	(2)
2003	Republic of Ireland U20	2	(0)
2010–2012	Republic of Ireland	16	(3)
- * Club domestic league appearances and goals

Keith Declan Fahey (born 15 January 1983) is an Irish former professional footballer, who played most of his career with League of Ireland side St Patrick's Athletic, as well as English club Birmingham City. He played predominantly as a central midfielder, but also occasionally as a winger.

Fahey started his professional career as a trainee with Arsenal. He played for Aston Villa, Bluebell United, St Patrick's Athletic and Drogheda United before his transfer to Birmingham City. With Birmingham City he won the 2011 League Cup in England, as well as helping the club gain promotion from the Football League Championship to the Premier League during the 2008–09 season. He left the club at the end of the 2012–13 season, and returned to St Patrick's Athletic for a third spell with the club.

With the Republic of Ireland national team, Fahey gained 16 caps. He was part of the squad that secured qualification for UEFA Euro 2012. Manager Giovanni Trapattoni called Fahey into the Irish squad for the tournament, but he was later sent home due to injury.

== Club career ==
=== Early career ===
Fahey started his professional career as a trainee with Arsenal before signing for Aston Villa in April 2000 for a fee of £250,000. He played for Villa's youth and reserve teams, but never made a first-team appearance.

=== Return to Ireland ===
Having failed to settle in England, Fahey returned home in 2003. He initially played a few games in non-League football for Bluebell United, before a six-week trial at St Patrick's Athletic led to a contract. He made his League of Ireland debut and had a goal disallowed at Waterford United on 21 April.

He contributed to St Pats's victory in the League of Ireland Cup and scored a "stunning" free kick in extra time of the semi-final replay against Bohemians to reach the FAI Cup final. However the final turned out to be very disappointing for both team and player, who was sent off for a "two-footed lunge" on Longford Town's Sean Prunty after 77 minutes as the Saints lost 2–0.

He joined Drogheda United in exchange for Alan Reilly and a cash adjustment in July 2005. He was involved in Mark Leech's golden goal that won the Setanta Cup for Drogheda in April 2006, but a few months later was released, following a disagreement with manager Paul Doolin, and returned to St Pats.

RTÉ reported that "Danger man Fahey was quieter than usual" as Pats lost 2–0 to Hertha BSC in the first round of the 2008–09 UEFA Cup, held at the Olympiastadion; however, in the second leg, despite Pats' "excellent performance" failing to overturn the deficit, an RTÉ feature picked out "Keith Fahey's control of the game, dictating almost every Pat's attack with that delicate but incisive right foot of his. Fahey stood head and shoulders above the many highly decorated full internationals in the Hertha team, showing the full range of his passing from deep and from close range, and generally showing a poise and guile on the ball that you would not expect from a League of Ireland player amongst such illustrious company."

His performances for St Pats in 2008, in which he scored 11 goals in all competitions, earned Fahey the PFAI Player of the Year award. He also won Monday Night Soccer's 2008 Goal of the Season. After Pats were beaten by Bohemians in the FAI Cup, Fahey declared that he wished to move to an English club to further his career.

=== Birmingham City ===
On 2 December 2008, Fahey signed a pre-contract agreement with Football League Championship side Birmingham City to join the club when the transfer window opened in January 2009, with the fee reported to be worth €355,000 plus a further €237,000 in add-ons to his former club St Patrick's Athletic. The Irish season having finished, Fahey joined up with Birmingham in mid-December for training, though manager Alex McLeish suggested supporters should not "expect him to walk straight into the team" when he became eligible in January.

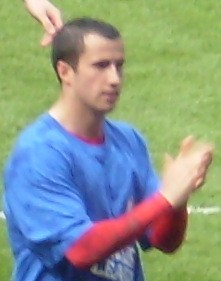
Fahey celebrating Birmingham's promotion to the Premier League in May 2009

Fahey made his Birmingham debut on 17 January 2009, coming on as a late substitute in a 1–1 draw against Cardiff City. He scored his first goal for the club, a "delicate lob" which the player admitted was meant to be a cross, to clinch a 2–0 home victory against Nottingham Forest on 14 February. His second goal gave the Blues a 1–0 home win over Southampton some weeks later. Fahey retained his place in the side for the rest of the season (keeping loan signings Scott Sinclair and Hamer Bouazza out of the starting eleven), and was a key player for Birmingham in their successful bid for promotion to the Premier League, scoring a goal and making a goal in a vital 2–1 win at Reading on the last day of the campaign.

Fahey made his Premier League debut in the opening game of the 2009–10 season at Old Trafford, in the 1–0 defeat against Manchester United. He made 34 appearances in his first Premier League season (18 of which he started), but failed to score all season, as Birmingham finished in ninth place, their highest ever position in the Premier League. In July 2010, Fahey's contract was extended to 2013, in recognition of his having "proved to [McLeish] that he's a Premier League player". He was part of the starting eleven as Birmingham won the 2011 League Cup, defeating favourites Arsenal 2–1 at Wembley Stadium. The league season proved less successful for both player and club. Fahey made only 24 appearances, although he did score his first (and only) Premier League goal, and Birmingham finished 18th and were relegated on the last day of the season following a 2–1 defeat to Tottenham Hotspur.

Following relegation, Barry Ferguson, Craig Gardner and Lee Bowyer left the club, giving Fahey the chance to establish himself in his preferred central position. After recovering from hernia surgery early in the 2011–12 season, he partnered Jonathan Spector in a solid midfield supporting two attacking wide players. Later in the season, he played a defensive support role alongside the more attacking Jordon Mutch, and manager Chris Hughton suggested he was "enjoying playing in that central role and he's enjoying the development he's had there all season". When he suffered a groin problem that caused him to miss the last few weeks of the season, Hughton called it "a real blow for us ... because he's a player that has been in really good form". He scored four goals during the season, including "a venomous left-foot drive from 20 yards" at Barnsley and a goal he "couldn't have hit ... any sweeter first time, or with any more power" at home to Crystal Palace that earned him the club's Goal of the Season award.

Fahey returned to the team in mid-September, and made seven appearances, four of which were starts. In November, he returned home to Ireland on indefinite compassionate leave for personal and family reasons. After two months away, Fahey took part in pre-season training with Shamrock Rovers, ahead of a full fitness assessment which preceded his return to training with Birmingham in mid-February. However, Fahey was ruled out for the rest of the season in April with a recurrence of a hip problem, having played just twice since his return from compassionate leave. At the end of the season, Fahey announced he was leaving Birmingham as the club had decided not to take up their option to extend his contract.

=== Return to St Patrick's Athletic ===
After a few months out of the game, Fahey trained with Sheffield United in October 2013. Following this, he returned to Ireland, where he rejoined his old club St Patrick's Athletic on 23 December 2013. Commenting on his move back to Richmond Park, he said "Both the fans and the club have always been great to me, and the stability of the club behind the scenes really made me want to come back and play my football in Inchicore again." He made his third debut for the club in a 2–1 victory over Dundalk on 17 February 2014 in a Leinster Senior Cup match, scoring a free kick. On 2 March 2014, Fahey scored the only goal as St Patrick's Athletic became the first team to win the FAI President's Cup, defeating Sligo Rovers in the process. His goal drew praise from Republic of Ireland manager Martin O'Neill and from Sligo Rovers' Alan Keane, who stated "A wonder goal won it, it was a great strike. No keeper in the world could have saved that."

Fahey started the first day of the season in the 1–1 away draw against Cork City. In the 1–1 draw away to Legia Warsaw in the second qualifying round of the UEFA Champions League, his through ball found Ian Bermingham who crossed for Christy Fagan's goal that gave Pats the lead. He started the return leg in Tallaght in which Pats lost 5–0. Fahey scored his first goal of the season against UCD in a 3–2 win. Overall Fahey made 26 league appearances scoring two goals throughout the season.

=== Shamrock Rovers ===
On 11 November 2014, Fahey switched to Shamrock Rovers. He announced his retirement in August 2015 having failed to recover from knee surgery. His last ever game of professional football was the 2–1 FAI Cup loss to his old club St Patrick's Athletic at Richmond Park as he was substituted off with his knee injury.

=== Return to Bluebell United ===
In 2017, Fahey returned to senior football and linked up with his former club Bluebell United in the Leinster Senior League Senior Division. He played three games for Bluebell, a 3–0 FAI Cup First Round win over Sheriff YC, a 1–0 win over League of Ireland First Division side Cabinteely in the next round of the cup (Fahey was sent off in the last minute making him miss the FAI Cup quarter-final away to Shamrock Rovers) and his final appearance in football came in a 5–1 defeat of Firhouse Clover in a top-of-the-table Leinster Senior League clash. Fahey retired from football in November 2017 after twisting his knee in training once again, later stating that "I'm glad now that it [his career] is finished. I am at the right place now, 100 percent."

== International career ==
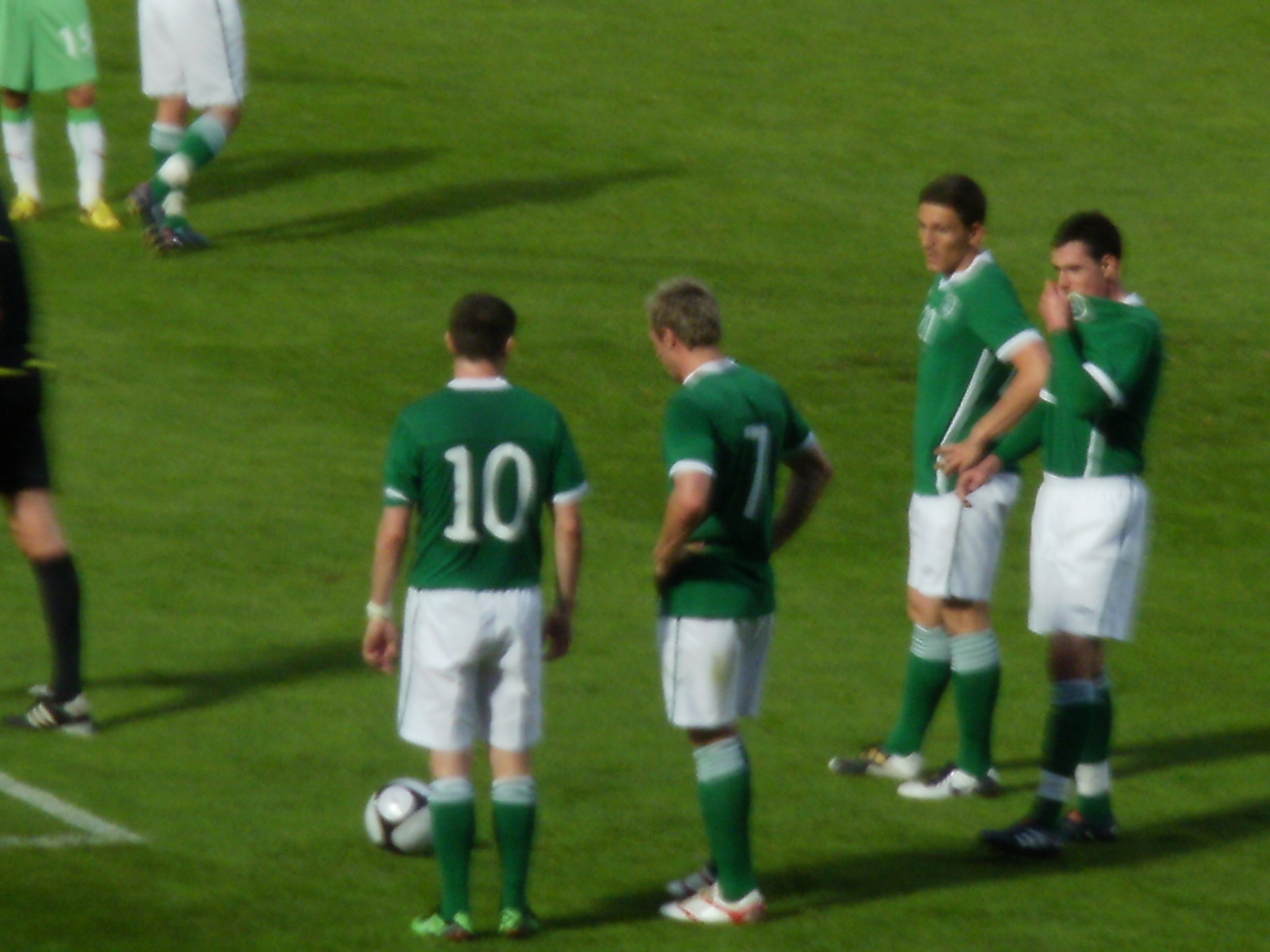
Fahey (furthest right) in a 2010 friendly against Algeria

Fahey played for the Republic of Ireland at the 2000 UEFA European Under-16 Football Championship and scored against their English counterparts.

He also played at the 2003 FIFA World Youth Championship, where he contributed to Ireland topping their group to reach the knockout stages. In the second round match against Colombia under-20, he came on as a late substitute to assist Kevin Doyle's goal and help turn the game around, coming back from a two-goal deficit only to lose on the golden goal.

On 25 May 2010, Fahey won his first senior cap for the Republic of Ireland in a 2–1 win against Paraguay at the RDS Arena, replacing Damien Duff in the 77th minute. He made his first start against Argentina on 12 August, in the first international match at the new Aviva Stadium. Fahey scored his first goal for the Republic of Ireland eight minutes into his competitive debut, coming off the bench to score the only goal in a Euro 2012 qualifying win over Armenia in Yerevan on 3 September 2010. On his first competitive start, in a 1–1 draw against Slovakia in Žilina on 12 October, Fahey delivered the free kick that led to Ireland's goal, scored by Sean St. Ledger. In February 2011, he scored his second goal for Ireland in a 3–0 defeat of Wales in the 2011 Nations Cup, and his third came in March 2011, a penalty against Uruguay.

Fahey was part of the squad that clinched victory in the inaugural Nations Cup with a 1–0 win over Scotland on 29 May 2011 at the Aviva Stadium.

He was called into the UEFA Euro 2012 squad but withdrew due to injury before the tournament.

== Career statistics ==
=== Club ===
Appearances and goals by club, season and competition
Club	Season	League			National cup (Note: Includes FA Cup & FAI Cup)		League cup (Note: Includes EFL Cup & League of Ireland Cup)		Europe		Other		Total	
Club	Season	Division	Apps	Goals	Apps	Goals	Apps	Goals	Apps	Goals	Apps	Goals	Apps	Goals
Aston Villa	2002–03	Premier League	0	0	0	0	0	0	0	0	—		0	0
St Patrick's Athletic	2003	LOI Premier Division	27	2	5	1	1	0	—		—		33	3
St Patrick's Athletic	2004	LOI Premier Division	33	5	1	0	2	0	—		—		36	5
St Patrick's Athletic	2005	LOI Premier Division	15	4	1	0	3	1	—		—		19	5
St Patrick's Athletic	Total		75	11	7	1	6	1	0	0	0	0	88	13
Drogheda United	2005	LOI Premier Division	14	2	0	0	0	0	—		0	0	14	2
Drogheda United	2006	LOI Premier Division	8	0	2	0	2	0	0	0			12	0
Drogheda United	Total		22	2	2	0	2	0	0	0			26	2
St Patrick's Athletic	2006	LOI Premier Division	14	3	—		—		—		0	0	14	3
St Patrick's Athletic	2007	LOI Premier Division	32	1	3	2	1	0	2 (Note: Appearances in UEFA Cup)	0	5 (Note: Appearances in Setanta Sports Cup)	1	43	4
St Patrick's Athletic	2008	LOI Premier Division	31	8	3	1	0	0	6	0	6	2	46	11
St Patrick's Athletic	Total		77	12	6	3	1	0	8	0	11	3	103	18
Birmingham City	2008–09	Championship	19	4	0	0	—		—		—		19	4
Birmingham City	2009–10	Premier League	34	0	5	0	1	0	—		—		40	0
Birmingham City	2010–11	Premier League	24	1	3	0	5	0	—		—		32	1
Birmingham City	2011–12	Championship	35	4	3	0	1	0	5 (Note: Appearances in UEFA Europa League)	0	0	0	44	4
Birmingham City	2012–13	Championship	9	0	0	0	0	0	—		—		9	0
Birmingham City	Total		121	9	11	0	7	0	5	0	0	0	144	9
St Patrick's Athletic	2014	LOI Premier Division	26	2	6	1	0	0	2 (Note: Appearances in UEFA Champions League)	0	4 (Note: Two appearances in Setanta Cup, one appearance one goal in Leinster Senior Cup, one appearance one goal in FAI President's Cup)	2	38	5
Shamrock Rovers	2015	LOI Premier Division	12	0	1	0	0	0	0	0	0	0	13	0
Bluebell United	2017–18	LSL Senior Division	1	0	2	0	0	0	—		0	0	3	0
Career total			334	36	36	5	16	1	15	0	15	5	413	47

=== International ===
Appearances and goals by national team and year
National team	Year	Apps	Goals
Republic of Ireland	2010	7	1
Republic of Ireland	2011	8	2
Republic of Ireland	2012	1	0
Total		16	3

Scores and results list the Republic of Ireland's goal tally first, score column indicates score after each Fahey goal.

List of international goals scored by Keith Fahey
No.	Date	Venue	Opponent	Score	Result	Competition
1	3 September 2010	Hanrapetakan Stadium, Yerevan, Armenia	Armenia	1–0	1–0	UEFA Euro 2012 qualifying
2	8 February 2011	Aviva Stadium, Dublin, Ireland	Wales	3–0	3–0	2011 Nations Cup
3	29 March 2011	Aviva Stadium, Dublin, Ireland	Uruguay	2–3	2–3	Friendly

== Honours ==
St Patrick's Athletic

- League of Ireland Cup: 2003
- President's Cup: 2014
- Leinster Senior Cup: 2014
- FAI Cup: 2014

Drogheda United

- Setanta Sports Cup: 2006

Birmingham City

- Football League Cup: 2010–11
- Football League Championship runner-up: 2008–09

Republic of Ireland

- Nations Cup: 2011

Individual

- PFAI Players' Player of the Year: 2008
- Monday Night Soccer Goal of the Season: 2008
- Birmingham City Goal of the Season: 2011–12 (vs Crystal Palace)
- St Patrick's Athletic Player of the Year: 2004, 2007, 2008
