= David Murphy (footballer, born 1984) =

English footballer

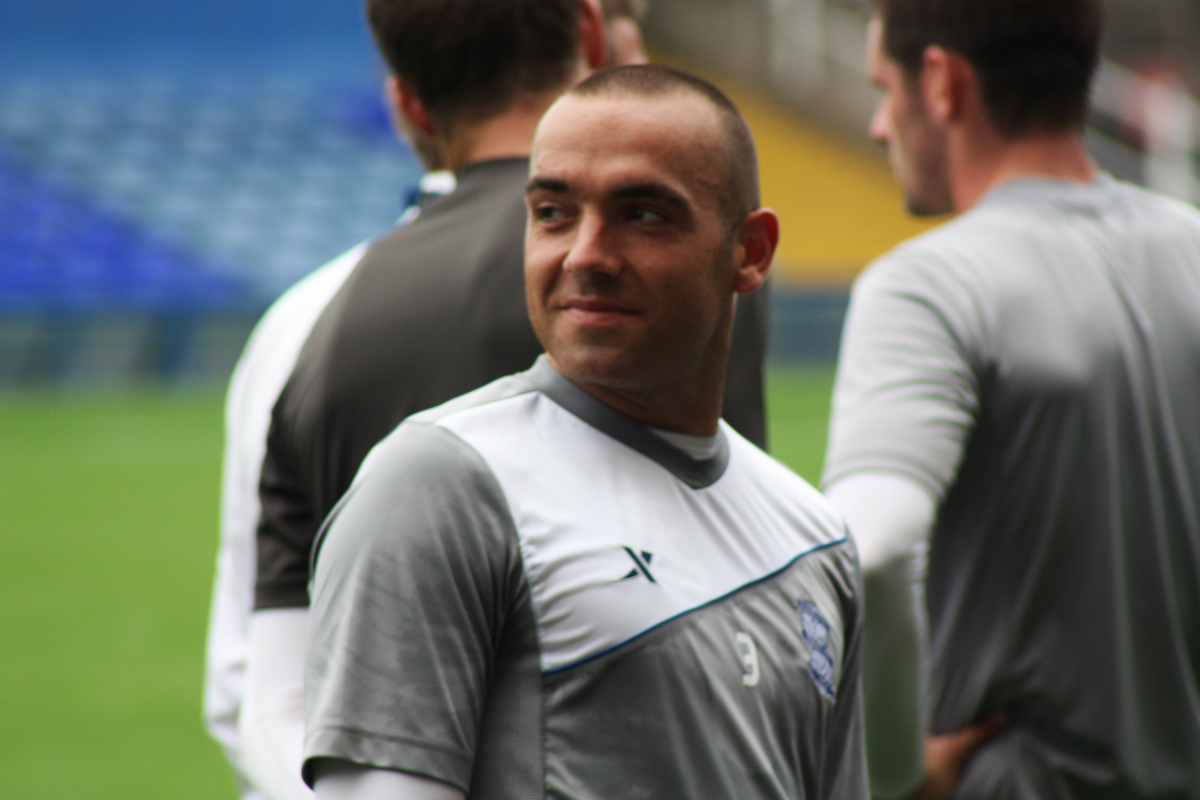
- With Birmingham City in 2011 pre-season

Personal information
- Full name: David Paul Murphy
- Date of birth: 1 March 1984 (age 42)
- Place of birth: Hartlepool, England
- Height: 6 ft 0 in (1.83 m)
- Position: Left back

Youth career
- Middlesbrough

Senior career*
| Years | Team | Apps | (Gls) |
| 2001–2004 | Middlesbrough | 13 | (0) |
| 2004 | → Barnsley (loan) | 10 | (2) |
| 2004–2008 | Hibernian | 107 | (4) |
| 2008–2014 | Birmingham City | 106 | (7) |
| Total | | 236 | (13) |

International career
| –2001 | England U16 | | |
- * Club domestic league appearances and goals

David Paul Murphy (born 1 March 1984) is an English former professional footballer who made more than 200 appearances in the English and Scottish Leagues. Born in Hartlepool, County Durham, Murphy played as a left back.

Murphy started his professional career at Premier League side Middlesbrough in 2001, and remained at the club for three years, making sixteen appearances. During his time at Middlesbrough, he also had a loan spell with Division Two side Barnsley in 2004, where he made ten appearances. He left Middlesbrough for Scottish Premier League side Hibernian in the summer of 2004, and made 134 appearances for the club, before signing for Birmingham City in January 2008. He played 132 matches for the club in all competitions, and was an unused substitute as they won the 2011 League Cup Final, but his six-year stay was blighted by injuries, and he retired from football on medical advice in March 2014.

He played several times for England at under-16 level.

== Club career ==
=== Early career ===
Murphy signed his first professional contract with Premier League side Middlesbrough in August 2001, having previously been part of the club's youth academy. He made his professional debut in a 3–1 victory over Northampton Town in the League Cup on 11 September 2001, a game where he also scored his first ever senior goal. He appeared in Middlesbrough's next League Cup match, a 2–1 defeat to Blackburn Rovers, before making his FA Cup debut on 16 February 2002, in a 1–0 victory over Blackburn. Three days later, he made his Premier League debut in a 2–1 victory over Fulham, coming off the substitute's bench around the hour mark to replace Robbie Mustoe. He went on to make a total of eight appearances during the 2001–02 season, scoring one goal.

He started the opening game of the 2002–03 Premier League season, a 0–0 draw against Southampton on 17 August 2002, but was replaced by Colin Cooper after 15 minutes of the match. He did not play again until 11 January 2003, where he played the last 20 minutes of a 2–2 draw, also against Southampton. He made six further appearances during the season, with his last appearance coming in a 1–1 draw with Charlton Athletic on 22 March 2003, a game he started, but was replaced by Franck Queudrue at half-time.

A broken foot that failed to heal kept Murphy out of Middlesbrough's squad in 2003–04, so in order to regain fitness he joined Division Two side Barnsley on loan, initially for a month, in March 2004. He made his Barnsley debut in a 2–1 defeat against Sheffield Wednesday on 13 March; his mistake allowed striker Guylain Ndumbu-Nsungu to score his second goal of the match. Despite the error, Murphy remained in the team for the next match three days later, a 1–1 draw with Oldham Athletic. The loan was extended to the end of the season, and Murphy made ten appearances for Barnsley, the last of which came in a 3–2 victory over Stockport County on 8 May.

=== Hibernian ===
He was released by Middlesbrough and signed for Hibernian in the summer of 2004 after making a trial appearance against Cardiff City in a pre-season friendly. Murphy was a player that manager Tony Mowbray became aware of through contacts at Middlesbrough. Murphy went on to become an important part of a relatively successful Hibernian side, which won the Scottish League Cup in 2007. On 6 October 2007, Murphy scored the winning goal in a 1–0 victory against Rangers at Ibrox Stadium to send Hibernian top of the league for the first time in seven years.

=== Birmingham City ===
On 17 January 2008, Murphy signed for Birmingham City for a fee of £1.5 million. He made his first-team debut on 2 February in the Premier League against Derby County, taking over the position from former Middlesbrough teammate Franck Queudrue. He scored his first goal for Birmingham on the final day of the season, but this was not enough to stave off relegation to the Championship. Murphy began the 2008–09 season as first-choice left back, and largely held off competition from Queudrue as the latter was more often needed at centre-back. Towards the end of the season he suffered a broken kneecap which caused him to miss the whole of the 2009–10 Premier League season as Liam Ridgewell, nominally a centre back, established himself as first choice left back.

On his return to first-team action, Murphy scored the opening goal as Birmingham beat Rochdale in the second round of the League Cup in August 2010. He was an unused substitute as Birmingham went on to win the competition, defeating favourites Arsenal 2–1 in the final. Murphy made his first appearance of the 2011–12 season in the Europa League play-off round first leg against Portuguese club Nacional, the first time that Birmingham had participated in major European competition for nearly 50 years. He scored Birmingham's first goal as they beat Club Brugge 2–1 away in the Europa League group stage. He became a first-team regular after Ridgewell was injured in November 2011, retained his place, and scored seven goals over the season, including three goals towards the end of the campaign that helped the club reach a play-off position. Birmingham took up their option to extend Murphy's contract for a further two years, until June 2014.

Murphy suffered knee cartilage damage in November 2012 which was expected to keep him out of football for the rest of the season. After ten months out, he returned to first-team action in the starting eleven for the 4–1 win at home to Sheffield Wednesday in September 2013, and scored twice as Birmingham beat Millwall 4–0 a few days later. He played six times up to the end of October, but an adverse reaction in his knee requiring further treatment was expected to keep him out until the end of the year, and further injuries followed. In March 2014, two days after his 30th birthday, Murphy announced his retirement from playing:

All of my rehabilitation went as well as it could have done and I managed to return to playing for a brief spell. However, I wasn't able to sustain the heights of my previous form and as a result I have no option but to retire. Having sought advice from the surgeon and medical staff at the football club, I had to make sure in my own mind that I was ready to retire. I have reached that decision and will look forward to the next chapter in my life.

== International career ==
While a youngster with Middlesbrough, Murphy made several appearances for the England under-16 team. He was part of the squad that reached the semifinals of the 2001 European under-16 championships.

Alex McLeish, who signed Murphy for Birmingham, said that while he was Scotland manager he had investigated whether Murphy was eligible to play for Scotland. It transpired that Murphy had no Scottish ancestors and was therefore ineligible. Murphy himself looked into whether he could play for the Republic of Ireland, but it transpired that he was also ineligible for that country. Murphy's closest Irish relation, a great-grandparent, was one generation too far back to confer qualification.

== Personal life ==
Following his premature retirement from football, Murphy opened bars in Marbella and Essex. In an interview with The Northern Echo in April 2022, Murphy revealed he now co-owned a refurbishment business in Teesside which had been in operation since 2019.

== Career statistics ==
Appearances and goals by club, season and competition
| Club | Season | League | | | National Cup | | League Cup | | Other | | Total | |
| Club | Season | Division | Apps | Goals | Apps | Goals | Apps | Goals | Apps | Goals | Apps | Goals |
|---|---|---|---|---|---|---|---|---|---|---|---|---|
| Middlesbrough | 2001–02 | Premier League | 5 | 0 | 1 | 0 | 2 | 1 | — | | 8 | 1 |
| Middlesbrough | 2002–03 | Premier League | 8 | 0 | 0 | 0 | 0 | 0 | — | | 8 | 0 |
| Middlesbrough | 2003–04 | Premier League | 0 | 0 | 0 | 0 | 0 | 0 | — | | 0 | 0 |
| Middlesbrough | Total | | 13 | 0 | 1 | 0 | 2 | 1 | — | | 16 | 1 |
| Barnsley (loan) | 2003–04 | Division Two | 10 | 2 | 0 | 0 | 0 | 0 | — | | 10 | 2 |
| Hibernian | 2004–05 | Scottish Premier League | 27 | 1 | 3 | 0 | 2 | 0 | — | | 32 | 1 |
| Hibernian | 2005–06 | Scottish Premier League | 30 | 1 | 4 | 0 | 1 | 0 | 2 (Note: Appearances in UEFA Cup) | 0 | 37 | 1 |
| Hibernian | 2006–07 | Scottish Premier League | 33 | 0 | 5 | 1 | 5 | 1 | 4 (Note: Appearances in UEFA Intertoto Cup) | 1 | 47 | 3 |
| Hibernian | 2007–08 | Scottish Premier League | 17 | 2 | — | | 1 | 0 | — | | 18 | 2 |
| Hibernian | Total | | 107 | 4 | 12 | 1 | 9 | 1 | 6 | 1 | 134 | 7 |
| Birmingham City | 2007–08 | Premier League | 14 | 1 | — | | — | | — | | 14 | 1 |
| Birmingham City | 2008–09 | Championship | 30 | 0 | 0 | 0 | 2 | 0 | — | | 32 | 0 |
| Birmingham City | 2009–10 | Premier League | 0 | 0 | 0 | 0 | 0 | 0 | — | | 0 | 0 |
| Birmingham City | 2010–11 | Premier League | 10 | 0 | 4 | 2 | 5 | 1 | — | | 19 | 3 |
| Birmingham City | 2011–12 | Championship | 33 | 4 | 4 | 1 | 1 | 0 | 9 (Note: Two appearances in Football League Championship play-offs, seven appearances and two goals in UEFA Europa League) | 2 | 47 | 7 |
| Birmingham City | 2012–13 | Championship | 13 | 0 | 0 | 0 | 1 | 0 | — | | 14 | 0 |
| Birmingham City | 2013–14 | Championship | 6 | 2 | 0 | 0 | 0 | 0 | — | | 6 | 2 |
| Birmingham City | Total | | 106 | 7 | 8 | 3 | 9 | 1 | 9 | 2 | 132 | 13 |
| Career total | | | 236 | 13 | 21 | 4 | 20 | 3 | 15 | 3 | 292 | 23 |

== Honours ==
Hibernian

- Scottish League Cup: 2006–07

Birmingham City

- Football League Cup: 2010–11
