= 2011 Football League Cup final =

- Match programme cover
- Event: 2010–11 Football League Cup
Arsenal	Birmingham City
1	2
- Date: 27 February 2011
- Venue: Wembley Stadium, London
- Man of the Match: Ben Foster (Birmingham City)
- Referee: Mike Dean (Cheshire)
- Attendance: 88,851
- Weather: Mostly cloudy 6 °C (43 °F)

The 2011 Football League Cup final was the final match of the 2010–11 Football League Cup, the 51st season of the Football League Cup, a football competition for the 92 teams in the Premier League and the Football League. The match was contested by Arsenal and Birmingham City, at Wembley Stadium in London, on 27 February 2011. Birmingham City won the game 2–1 and were guaranteed a spot in the third qualifying round of the 2011–12 UEFA Europa League. Mike Dean was the referee.

== Background ==
Arsenal held the advantage over Birmingham in the league matches between the two sides in 2010–11, having beaten them 2–1 at the Emirates Stadium in October and again 3–0 at St Andrew's on New Year's Day.

Arsenal had played in six Football League Cup finals, but had only won two, most recently in 1993 when they beat Sheffield Wednesday 2–1. Birmingham's only League Cup title came in 1963, when they beat local rivals Aston Villa 3–1 on aggregate after a two-legged final. They also reached the 2001 final, which was played at the Millennium Stadium in Cardiff against Liverpool, but the 2011 final was Birmingham's first appearance in the final of a major competition at Wembley for nearly 55 years, their last being the 1956 FA Cup final.

== Road to Wembley ==
Arsenal			Round	Birmingham City		
	Bye		Round 2^{[A]}	Birmingham City	3–2	Rochdale
Tottenham Hotspur	1–4	Arsenal (a.e.t.)	Round 3^{[B]}	Birmingham City	3–1	Milton Keynes Dons
Newcastle United	0–4	Arsenal	Round 4	Birmingham City	1–1 (4–3 pen.)	Brentford (a.e.t.)
Arsenal	2–0	Wigan Athletic	Round 5	Birmingham City	2–1	Aston Villa
Ipswich Town	1–0	Arsenal	Semifinal	West Ham United	2–1	Birmingham City
Arsenal	3–0	Ipswich Town	Semifinal	Birmingham City	3–1	West Ham United (a.e.t.)
Arsenal won 3–1 on aggregate			Semifinal	Birmingham City won 4–3 on aggregate		

== Pre-match ==
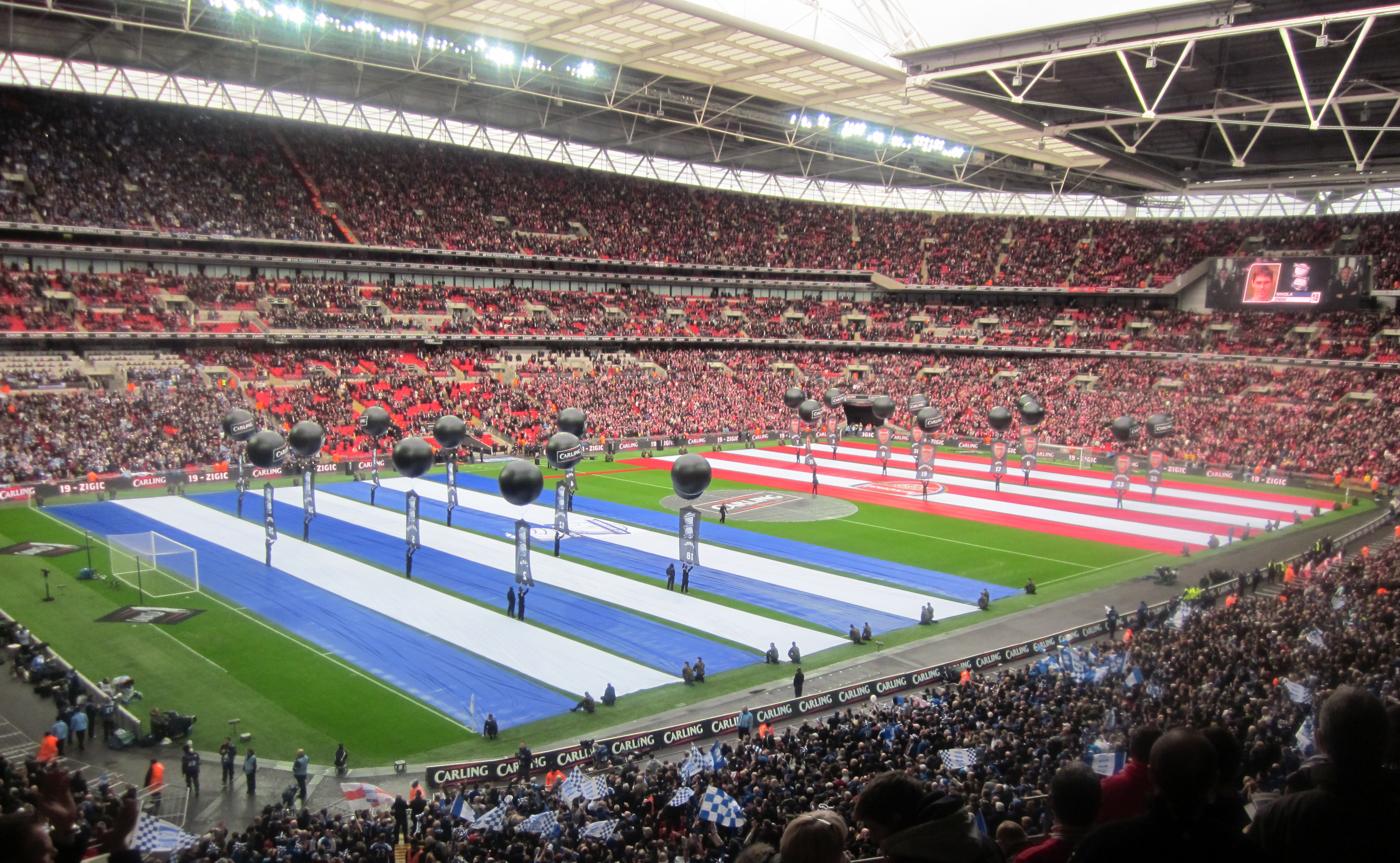
The starting line-ups being announced before kick-off

In the build-up to the game, Arsène Wenger criticised the FA and UEFA for overpricing tickets for their finals.

A number of Arsenal players missed out on the final. Thomas Vermaelen was not fit, while goalkeeper Łukasz Fabiański had been ruled out for the rest of the season. Theo Walcott picked up a sprained ankle in a match against Stoke City a few days prior, and captain Cesc Fàbregas was also injured in that game; both missed the final. Abou Diaby was also injured.

For Birmingham, Scott Dann was ruled out for the rest of the season following an injury in the League Cup semi-final, while James McFadden was still not recovered from an injury received in September. Former Arsenal player Alexander Hleb was injured in an FA Cup match the week before, and failed to recover in time to play. David Bentley, who had replaced Hleb in that match, was cup-tied, having played for Tottenham Hotspur in their defeat to Arsenal in the third round.

Arsenal were rated heavy odds-on favourites for the match, with Birmingham rated at worse than 5/1 against to win the game in 90 minutes.

== Match ==
=== Summary ===
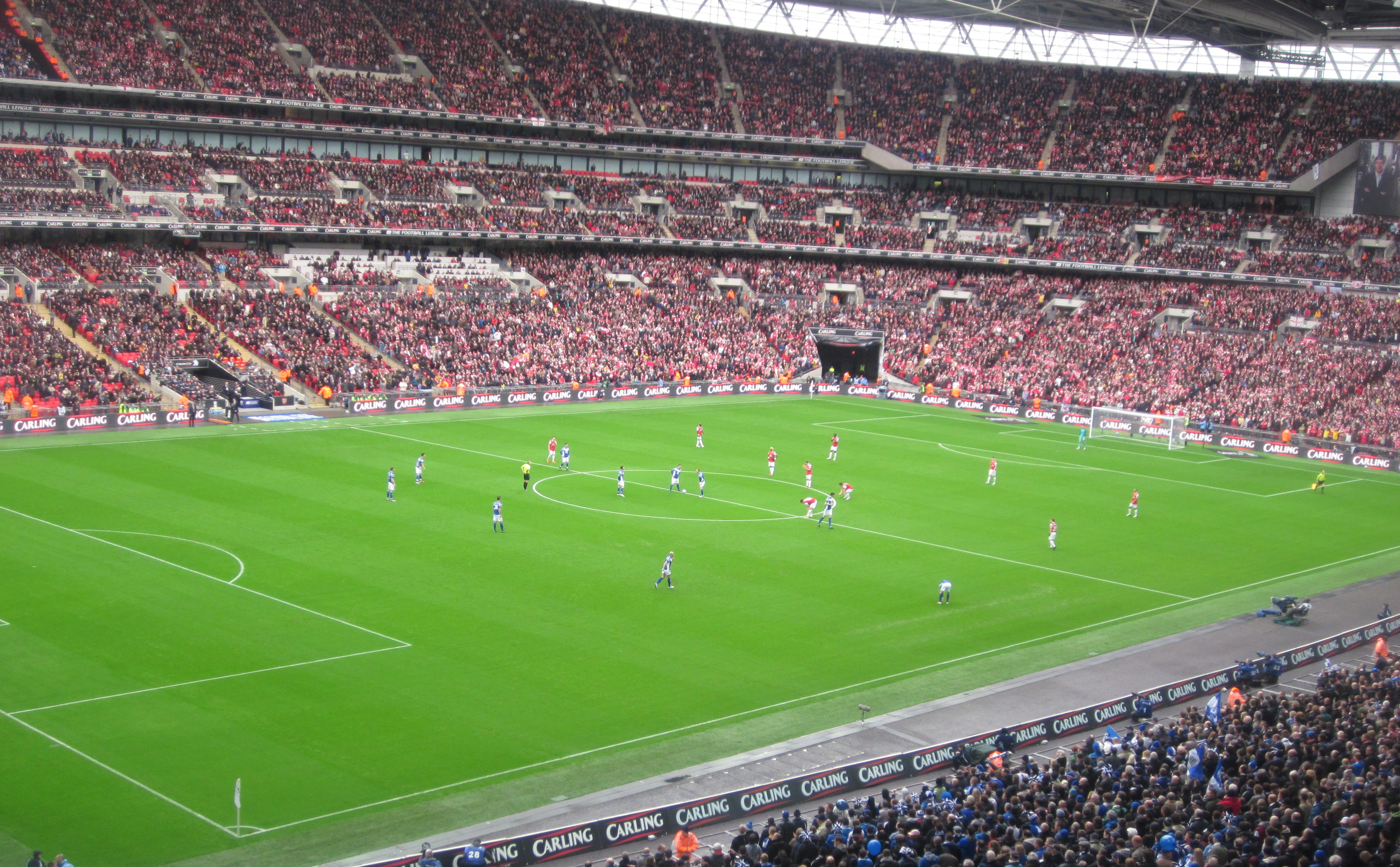
The teams lining up for kick-off

There was a moment of contention just two minutes into the match as an early Birmingham chance was created through Lee Bowyer, who appeared to be fouled by Arsenal goalkeeper Wojciech Szczęsny in what would probably have been a penalty kick and red card for the keeper. However, Bowyer had already been flagged offside (a decision that replays proved was incorrect).

After ten minutes, Birmingham's Barry Ferguson was involved in a collision, and played the rest of the game with what proved to be two broken ribs.

Arsenal threatened regularly throughout the course of the match, with an eventual 20 attempts on goal to Birmingham's 11 (both teams were denied by the woodwork once), however the fine work of Birmingham goalkeeper Ben Foster kept the north London team at bay. Foster would go on to win the man of the match award, and with it, the Alan Hardaker Trophy (also making Foster the first-ever player to win the trophy on two occasions).

Birmingham took the lead in the 28th minute when a corner kick was sent into the box, Roger Johnson won the initial header towards goal which was then flicked in off the head of Nikola Žigić past Wojciech Szczęsny into the net. Arsenal levelled 11 minutes later when, moments after Jack Wilshere struck the crossbar with a shot, Robin van Persie volleyed an Andrei Arshavin cross in with his right foot. However, Van Persie injured himself upon landing, and while he was initially able to continue, he struggled as the match went on and was eventually substituted by Nicklas Bendtner partway through the second half. Going into half-time the scoreline stayed at 1–1, with both teams failing to capitalise on good opportunities to score a second, including Arsenal's Samir Nasri who had a long-range effort saved, and then in the second half Birmingham's Keith Fahey was denied by the post.

On 83 minutes, Birmingham brought on Obafemi Martins in place of Fahey. Six minutes later, and in the final minute of normal time, Martins scored to put Birmingham 2–1 up after a mix-up between Szczęsny and defender Laurent Koscielny. A long ball from Blues keeper Foster, flicked on by Žigić, appeared to be heading safely into the hands of the Arsenal keeper. But Koscielny attempted to play the ball, distracting Szczęsny and causing him to bobble the ball into the path of Martins, who tapped it into an empty net.

Too little time was left for Arsenal to recover, and after four-and-a-half minutes of injury time was seen out, Birmingham City secured their second Football League Cup trophy.

=== Details ===
27 February 2011
16:00 GMT

Arsenal	1–2	Birmingham City
Van Persie 39'	Report	Žigić 28'; Martins 89'

Wembley Stadium, London
Attendance: 88,851
Referee: Mike Dean (Cheshire)

Arsenal	Birmingham City

GK	53	(Poland) Wojciech Szczęsny
RB	3	(France) Bacary Sagna
CB	20	(Switzerland) Johan Djourou
CB	6	(France) Laurent Koscielny	(yellow card) 35'
LB	22	(France) Gaël Clichy	(yellow card) 52'
CM	17	(Cameroon) Alex Song
CM	19	(England) Jack Wilshere
RW	7	(Czech Republic) Tomáš Rosický
AM	8	(France) Samir Nasri
LW	23	(Russia) Andrey Arshavin		(substituted off) 77'
CF	10	(Netherlands) Robin van Persie (c)		(substituted off) 69'
Substitutes:
GK	1	(Spain) Manuel Almunia
DF	18	(France) Sébastien Squillaci
DF	27	(Ivory Coast) Emmanuel Eboué
DF	28	(England) Kieran Gibbs
MF	15	(Brazil) Denílson
FW	29	(Morocco) Marouane Chamakh		(substituted on) 77'
FW	52	(Denmark) Nicklas Bendtner		(substituted on) 69'
Manager:
(France) Arsène Wenger

GK	26	(England) Ben Foster
RB	2	(Republic of Ireland) Stephen Carr (c)
CB	5	(England) Roger Johnson
CB	28	(Czech Republic) Martin Jiránek
LB	6	(England) Liam Ridgewell
RM	7	(Sweden) Sebastian Larsson	(yellow card) 41'
CM	12	(Scotland) Barry Ferguson	(yellow card) 90+4'
LM	18	(Republic of Ireland) Keith Fahey		(substituted off) 83'
AM	8	(England) Craig Gardner		(substituted off) 50'
AM	4	(England) Lee Bowyer
CF	19	(Serbia) Nikola Žigić		(substituted off) 90+2'
Substitutes:
GK	1	(Northern Ireland) Maik Taylor
DF	3	(England) David Murphy
DF	21	(England) Stuart Parnaby
DF	23	(Chile) Jean Beausejour		(substituted on) 50'
FW	9	(England) Kevin Phillips
FW	10	(England) Cameron Jerome	(yellow card) 90+3'	(substituted on) 90+2'
FW	17	(Nigeria) Obafemi Martins		(substituted on) 83'
Manager:
(Scotland) Alex McLeish

Man of the match

- Ben Foster (Birmingham City)

Match officials

- Assistant referees:
  - Ron Ganfield (Somerset)
  - Mike Mullarkey (Devon)
- Fourth official: Kevin Friend (Leicestershire)

Match rules

- 90 minutes
- 30 minutes of extra time if necessary
- Penalty shootout if scores still level
- Seven named substitutes
- Maximum of three substitutions

=== Statistics ===
	Arsenal	Birmingham
Total shots	20	11
Shots on target	12	7
Ball possession	56%	44%
Corner kicks	6	3
Fouls committed	11	9
Offsides	2	4
Yellow cards	2	3
Red cards	0	0

Source: BBC Sport

== Post-match ==
Arsenal players collapsed to the pitch in devastation upon the final whistle as they suffered extension to the trophy drought that began in 2005 when they beat Manchester United in the final of the 2004–05 FA Cup. Manager Arsène Wenger admitted that the defeat was "very hard to take" but refused to blame anyone for it. He said: "The players are disappointed but we have to pick ourselves up, that's what a team is about. [...] We got what we expected from Birmingham. They are a team who fight very hard and cause a lot of problems from long balls. Congratulations to them, they got the trophy, but we have regrets with the way we conceded the [Martins] goal". Despite the intention to recover from the defeat Arsenal would go on to suffer a significant drop in form, losing a great number of the remaining matches, being knocked out of the Champions League and the FA Cup and eventually finishing 4th place in the league. They would not win a trophy until 2014, beating Hull City in the final of the 2013–14 FA Cup.

Birmingham boss Alex McLeish hailed his team's triumph, saying that the final win was his "greatest achievement" as a manager, adding: "I am so pleased for the fans, they have craved victory for a long time. [...] For a small club like ours to beat Arsenal was a titanic effort. [...] No-one gave us a prayer, we were underdogs but sometimes the bookies don't get it right". Winning goalscorer Obafemi Martins commented that "it means a lot to the fans and the players because Birmingham really needed this trophy", while man-of-the-match Ben Foster reflected on the win saying "the main thing was that the lads kept fighting. You could see how tired we were but we just kept working and working. That's the spirit we've got". Birmingham would later go on to suffer relegation in the league during the season and were knocked out in the group stage of the 2011–12 UEFA Europa League the following season.

== Notes ==
A. Clubs competing in the Premier League, but not in UEFA competitions, receive a bye to the second round.
B. Clubs competing in UEFA competitions receive a bye to the third round.
