= Scott Dann =

English footballer (born 1987)

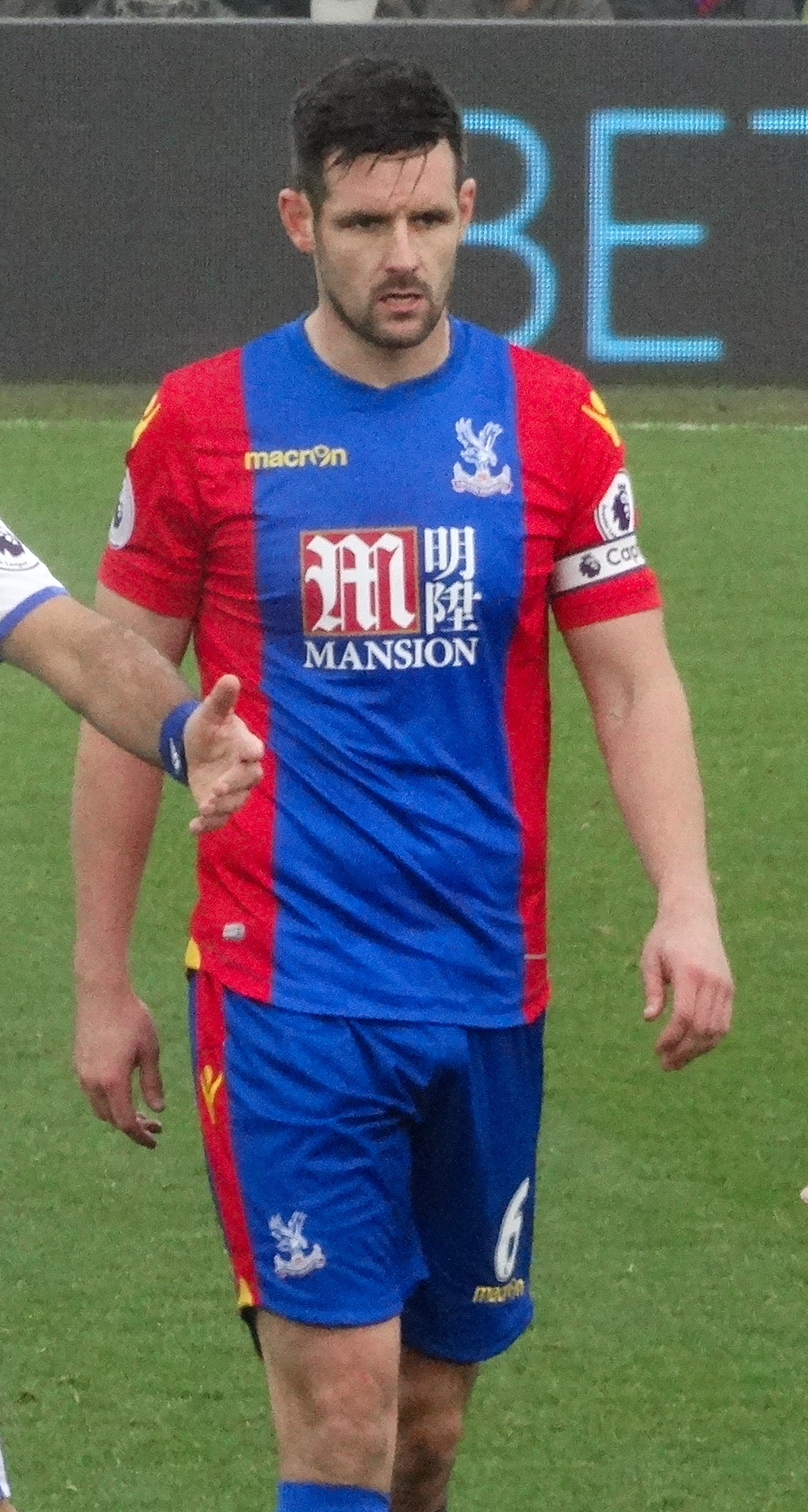
- Dann playing for Crystal Palace in 2016

Personal information
- Full name: Scott Dann
- Date of birth: 14 February 1987 (age 39)
- Place of birth: Liverpool, England
- Height: 6 ft 2 in (1.88 m)
- Position: Centre-back

Youth career
- 2003–2004: Walsall

Senior career*
Years	Team	Apps	(Gls)
2004–2008	Walsall	59	(7)
2005	→ Køge BK (loan)	2	(0)
2005–2006	→ Redditch United (loan)		
2006	→ Hednesford Town (loan)		
2008–2009	Coventry City	47	(3)
2009–2011	Birmingham City	50	(2)
2011–2014	Blackburn Rovers	98	(5)
2014–2021	Crystal Palace	164	(13)
2021–2023	Reading	31	(2)
Total		451	(32)

International career
2008	England U21	2	(0)
- * Club domestic league appearances and goals

Scott Dann (born 14 February 1987) is an English former professional footballer who played as a centre-back.

He began his Football League career with Walsall, before moving on to Coventry City and then to Birmingham City in 2009. After Birmingham's relegation from the Premier League, Dann joined Blackburn Rovers in August 2011 and was the club's captain. He then joined Crystal Palace in January 2014 and left the club in June 2021, joining Reading. He departed Reading at the end of the 2022–23 season.

== Early life ==
Dann was born in Liverpool, Merseyside, and attended Archbishop Beck High School in the Walton district of the city. He is a former Liverpool F.C. season ticket holder.

== Career ==
=== Walsall ===
Dann joined Walsall in 2003 as a junior after impressing on trial at the Bescot Stadium, signing a professional contract with the Saddlers the following year. He moved up the ranks at Walsall to become a regular in the reserve team throughout 2004–05 and was allowed to join Danish side Køge BK on loan towards the end of the campaign, where he played twice under Gregor Rioch.

Dann then joined Conference North side Redditch United on loan in October 2005 initially until the end of the season, but he was recalled in January 2006. He then Joined Redditch's league rivals Hednesford Town on loan following injuries to their regular centre-backs Richard Teesdale and Ian Wright. He played in three games for the Pitmen, against Hucknall Town, Stafford Rangers and Lancaster City, before injury put an end to his loan spell at Keys Park. He returned to Walsall and was put on a short-term contract for the 2006–07 season, where he earned his place in the starting line-up with a number of excellent performances at the back. His season was ended in March 2007 after picking up a metatarsal injury in the game against Milton Keynes Dons.

As reward for his outstanding season for the Saddlers, who were promoted as League Two Champions, Dann was given a three-year contract to commit him to the club and to ward off interest from a number of clubs higher up in the league.

=== Coventry City ===
His form in League One was equally as impressive as the previous season, so it was little surprise that in January 2008 Dann joined Coventry City for an undisclosed fee, suggested in the media to be "in excess of £1 million". His impressive form for the Saddlers continued in the Championship for the Sky Blues alongside former Walsall teammate Daniel Fox, who had also moved to the Ricoh Arena. He helped the club narrowly avoid relegation. The England set-up had seen enough in Dann and Fox to decide they were ready to make the step up to international level, with both players making their U-21 debuts in March 2008 against Poland at Molineux.

Dann was appointed captain of Coventry City for the 2008–09 season.

=== Birmingham City ===
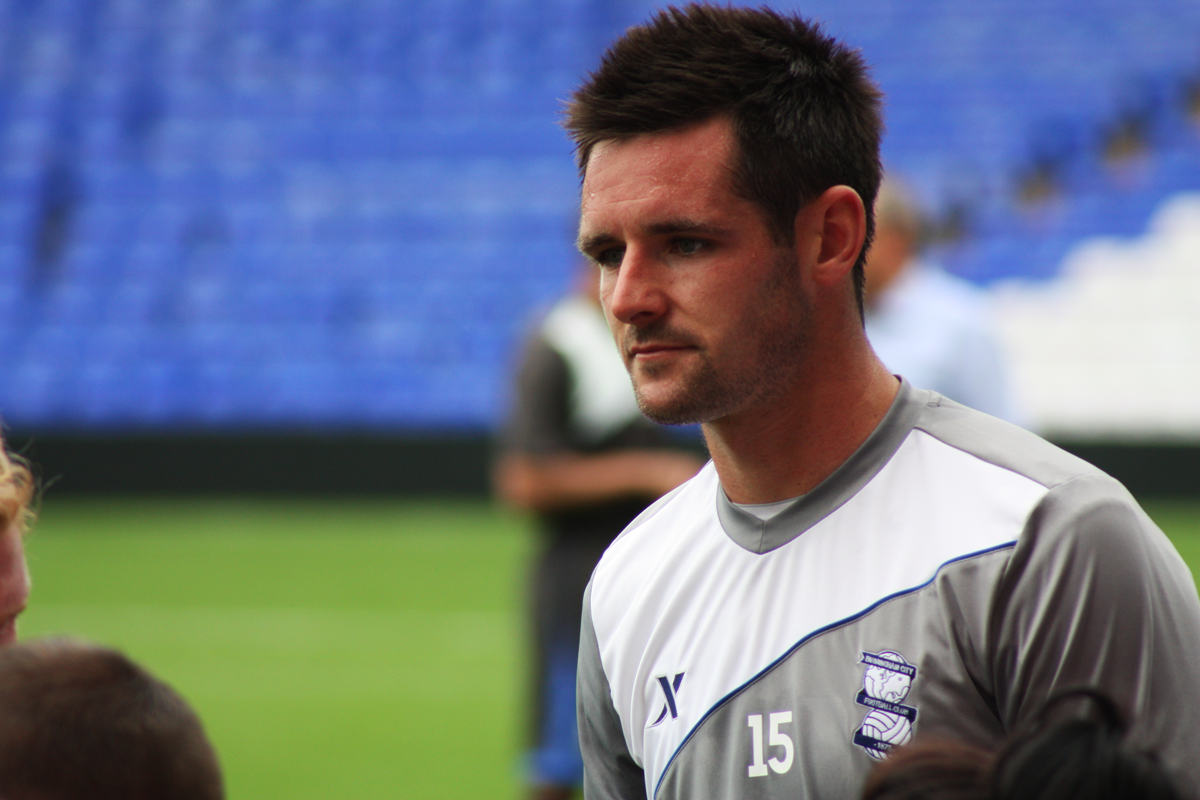
Dann in pre-season with Birmingham City in 2011

Dann signed for Birmingham City on 12 June 2009 for an undisclosed fee, described as a "club record fee for a defender"; local press reports suggested the fee to be in the region of £3.5 million, with a possible increase to £4 million, with performance-based add-ons. Surgery during the summer and then a pulled thigh muscle meant Dann was not fully match fit when an injury to Franck Queudrue gave him the chance to make his Premier League debut on 19 September at Hull City. Birmingham won 1–0, and Dann played well and retained his place in the starting eleven.

At Christmas 2009, The Times' Patrick Barclay described Dann and defensive partner Roger Johnson as "certainties" for his team of the season so far. His first goal for Birmingham came against Derby County in the FA Cup on 13 February 2010, during a run of 15 games unbeaten in all competitions, including a club record 12 unbeaten in the top flight. A calf injury sustained in training caused him to miss the last three games of the season as the club finished in ninth place, their best for more than 50 years.

Dann scored the opening goal as Birmingham beat a Hong Kong XI 3–2 in an invitation match branded the Xtep Cup, part of the club's 2010 pre-season tour of the Far East, and his first Premier League goal, a header from a Sebastian Larsson cross, on the opening weekend of the 2010–11 season as Birmingham drew 2–2 away at Sunderland. Following surgery on a hamstring damaged in the League Cup semi-final in January 2011, Dann was ruled out for the remainder of the season. The club were relegated from the Premier League on the final day of the season.

=== Blackburn Rovers ===
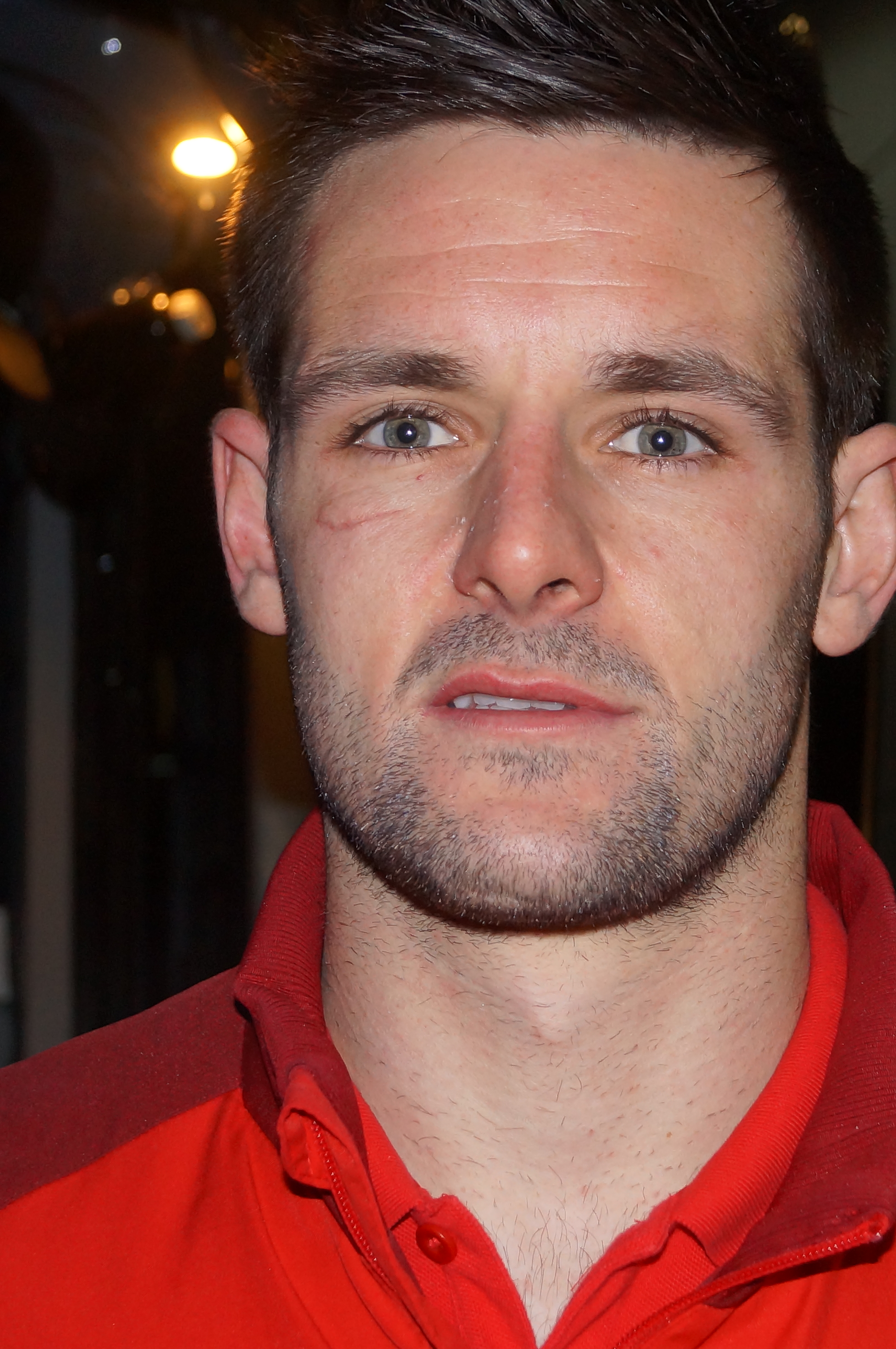
Dann with Blackburn Rovers in 2013

On 31 August 2011, the last day of the transfer window, Blackburn Rovers signed Dann on a four-year deal for an officially undisclosed fee, reported by BBC Sport as £6 million. Dann said that manager Steve Kean, with whom he had worked at Coventry, was "a big factor" in his decision to join the Ewood Park club. He was given squad number 16. On 11 September, he made his debut in a 1–1 draw with Fulham at Craven Cottage, starting alongside Christopher Samba and completing the full 90 minutes as Rovers earned their first point of the season. During the 2–1 home defeat to West Bromwich Albion in December, Dann scored his first goal for Rovers, but also suffered a ruptured testicle, an injury which was expected to keep him out for six weeks. At the end of the 2011–12 season, Dann made a total of 28 appearances in all competitions and also suffered relegation for the third time in his career as Rovers finished in 19th place in the Premier League.

On 12 March 2013, Dann was officially confirmed as captain of the club, succeeding Danny Murphy.

=== Crystal Palace ===
On 31 January 2014, Dann signed a three-and-a-half-year deal with Premier League club Crystal Palace for an undisclosed fee. He made his debut on 8 February in a 3–1 home win against West Bromwich Albion.

Dann won the club's Player of the Year award for 2014–15, followed by the Player's Player of the Year award for 2015–16.

In July 2015 he signed a new five-year contract with the club.

Ahead of the 2016–17 season, Dann replaced Mile Jedinak as captain. He was succeeded by Jason Puncheon for 2017–18. Both Dann and Puncheon suffered cruciate ligament injuries in the same match, against Manchester City in December 2017, that kept them out for the rest of the season. Dann returned to action just over a year later, starting in the FA Cup third round match against Grimsby Town.

Dann left Crystal Palace after his contract expired at the end of the 2020–21 season.

=== Reading ===
Dann signed a one-year contract with Championship club Reading on 30 August 2021. He scored his first goal for the club on 20 October in a 3–2 loss to Blackpool. In March 2022, Dann's contract was extended for a further year.

Dann made 18 appearances for Reading in the 2021–22 season. His appearances were limited during the second half of the campaign due to injury and he spent the first half of the 2022–23 campaign on the sidelines. On 2 January 2023, Dann made his first start in almost 10 months for Reading against West Bromwich Albion in a 1–0 defeat at The Hawthorns. On 17 May 2023, Reading announced that Dann would leave the club at the end of his contract.

== Career statistics ==
Appearances and goals by club, season and competition
Club	Season	League			FA Cup		League Cup		Other		Total	
Club	Season	Division	Apps	Goals	Apps	Goals	Apps	Goals	Apps	Goals	Apps	Goals
Walsall	2004–05	League One	1	0	0	0	0	0	0	0	1	0
Walsall	2005–06	League One	0	0	0	0	0	0	0	0	0	0
Walsall	2006–07	League Two	30	4	2	0	1	1	1 (Note: Appearance in Football League Trophy)	0	34	5
Walsall	2007–08	League One	28	3	5	0	1	0	0	0	34	3
Walsall	Total		59	7	7	0	2	1	1	0	69	8
Coventry City	2007–08	Championship	16	0	—		—		—		16	0
Coventry City	2008–09	Championship	31	3	2	0	2	1	—		35	4
Coventry City	Total		47	3	2	0	2	1	—		51	4
Birmingham City	2009–10	Premier League	30	0	4	1	1	0	—		35	1
Birmingham City	2010–11	Premier League	20	2	1	0	4	0	—		25	2
Birmingham City	2011–12	Championship	0	0	—		—		0	0	0	0
Birmingham City	Total		50	2	5	1	5	0	0	0	60	3
Blackburn Rovers	2011–12	Premier League	27	1	0	0	1	0	—		28	1
Blackburn Rovers	2012–13	Championship	46	4	5	1	1	0	—		52	5
Blackburn Rovers	2013–14	Championship	25	0	1	1	0	0	—		26	1
Blackburn Rovers	Total		98	5	6	2	2	0	—		106	7
Crystal Palace	2013–14	Premier League	14	1	—		—		—		14	1
Crystal Palace	2014–15	Premier League	34	2	3	2	0	0	—		37	4
Crystal Palace	2015–16	Premier League	35	5	6	0	1	0	—		42	5
Crystal Palace	2016–17	Premier League	23	3	0	0	2	1	—		25	4
Crystal Palace	2017–18	Premier League	17	1	0	0	1	0	—		18	1
Crystal Palace	2018–19	Premier League	10	0	3	0	0	0	—		13	0
Crystal Palace	2019–20	Premier League	16	0	0	0	1	0	—		17	0
Crystal Palace	2020–21	Premier League	15	1	0	0	0	0	—		15	1
Crystal Palace	Total		164	13	12	2	5	1	—		181	16
Reading	2021–22	Championship	18	2	0	0	0	0	—		18	2
Reading	2022–23	Championship	13	0	1	0	0	0	—		14	0
Reading	Total		31	2	1	0	0	0	0	0	32	2
Career total			449	32	33	5	16	3	1	0	499	40

== Honours ==
Walsall

- Football League Two: 2006–07

Birmingham City

- Football League Cup: 2010–11

Crystal Palace

- FA Cup runner-up: 2015–16

Individual

- Crystal Palace Player of the Year: 2014–15

Sporting positions
Preceded by Mile Jedinak	Captain of Crystal Palace; 2016–2017	Succeeded by Jason Puncheon
