= Patrick Barclay =

British sportswriter (1947–2025)

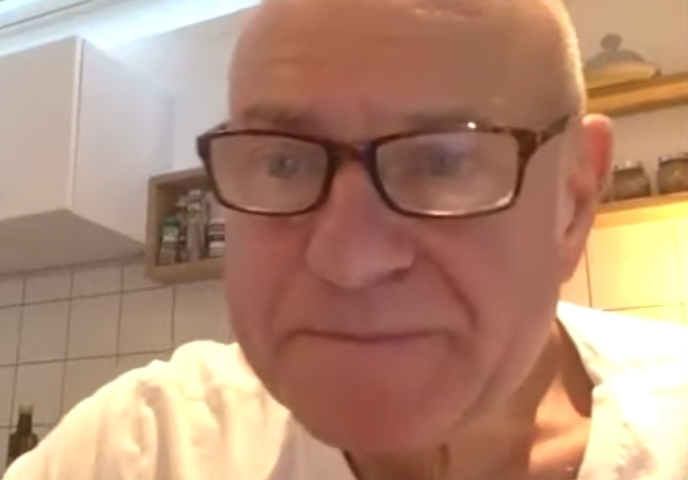
- Barclay in 2025
- Born: 15 August 1947; London, England
- Died: 12 February 2025 (aged 77)
- Education: High School of Dundee
- Occupations: Journalist; sports writer
- Children: 2
- Father: Guy Deghy

Patrick Barclay (15 August 1947 – 12 February 2025) was a British journalist and sportswriter.

== Early life ==
Barclay was born on 15 August 1947, in London; his father was Hungarian-born actor Guy Deghy. He moved to Dundee at the age of 4, where he was raised by his mother. Barclay was educated at the High School of Dundee.

== Career ==
Barclay started his reporting career with The Guardian in the early 1970s. When the newspaper The Independent was launched in 1986, he was appointed its first football correspondent. He joined The Observer in 1991, and became football correspondent of The Sunday Telegraph in 1996. He held the post for 12 years.

Barclay joined The Times in February 2009 as its Chief Football Correspondent to replace Martin Samuel, who was joining the Daily Mail. Thus, Barclay became one of the few journalists to be the main writer for his discipline for all four quality newspaper groups in England: Times, Guardian-Observer, Telegraph, and Independent. Barclay left The Times in December 2011 due to cost-cutting measures. In January 2012, he started writing for the London Evening Standard.

Barclay was a regular guest on the Sky Sports programme Sunday Supplement, and LBC 97.3's Saturday sports show "Scores".

=== Books ===
Barclay wrote a biography of the Manchester United manager Alex Ferguson, entitled Football – Bloody Hell!. The book was published in October 2010. He also wrote a biography of the former Arsenal manager Herbert Chapman entitled The Life and Times of Herbert Chapman: The Story of One of Football's Most Influential Figures and a biography of José Mourinho.

== Personal life and death ==
Barclay had two children, Duncan and Jennifer, and a granddaughter Charlotte. He died on 12 February 2025 at the age of 77.

=== List of publications ===
- Mourinho: Anatomy of a Winner (2005) ISBN 9780752873336
- Football-Bloody Hell!: The Biography of Alex Ferguson (2010) ISBN 9781407084718
- The Life and Times of Herbert Chapman (2014) ISBN 9780297868507
- Sir Matt Busby: The Definitive Biography (2017) ISBN 9781785032066
