= 2013–14 Birmingham City F.C. season =

Birmingham City F.C.
2013–14 season
- Acting chairman: Peter Pannu
- Manager: Lee Clark
- Stadium: St Andrew's
- Championship: 21st
- FA Cup: Fourth round
- League Cup: Fourth round
- Top goalscorer: League: Federico Macheda (10); All: Lee Novak (11 (Note: Birmingham's goal against Bolton Wanderers on 5 October, originally credited to Žigić, was retrospectively awarded to Novak.))
- Highest home attendance: 23,497 (vs Nottingham Forest, 21 December 2013)
- Lowest home attendance: 7,470 (vs Swansea City, League Cup 3rd round, 25 September 2013)
- Average home league attendance: 15,457
Home colours	Away colours

The 2013–14 season was Birmingham City Football Club's 111th season in the English football league system and third consecutive season in the Football League Championship. It ran from 1 July 2013 to 30 June 2014.

Birmingham finished 21st in the Championship. On the final day of the season, they needed at least a point away at Bolton Wanderers, and for other results to favour them, to avoid relegation to League One. After falling two goals behind, goals from Nikola Žigić after 78 minutes and Paul Caddis three minutes into stoppage time, combined with Doncaster Rovers' defeat, secured their second-tier status for a further season. In the League Cup, Birmingham lost to Premier League team Stoke City in the fourth round after a penalty shootout. They were eliminated by Swansea City, also of the Premier League, in the fourth round of the FA Cup.

Forty-one players made at least one appearance in first-team competition, of whom twelve were loan signings and a further three signed on short-term contracts; there were twenty different goalscorers. Chris Burke appeared in 49 of the 52 matches over the season; Darren Randolph played every minute of the 46 Championship matches. Loanee Federico Macheda was top league goalscorer, with 10 goals from only 18 appearances, while Lee Novak scored 11 goals in all competitions.

== Background and pre-season ==
When previous manager Chris Hughton resigned in 2012 to join Norwich City, he was reported to have "freely admitted privately that he felt it would be difficult to replicate what happened last season this season, and that things at Blues would get worse before they got better." Club president and major shareholder Carson Yeung's assets remained frozen and trading in the holding company's shares remained suspended, which combined with an income stream seriously reduced since relegation from the Premier League left new manager Lee Clark working for a club needing to generate cashflow by selling players. Birmingham finished 12th in the 2012–13 Football League Championship, their lowest finish since 1995–96.

Senior players Jonathan Spector, Wade Elliott, Colin Doyle and Paul Robinson signed contract extensions to remain with the club, and the club took up their option of another year on Chris Burke's contract, but club captain Stephen Carr retired, and Steven Caldwell, Pablo Ibáñez, Morgaro Gomis, Keith Fahey and Adam Rooney were released. Robinson took over the captaincy. Curtis Davies and Nathan Redmond were sold to Premier League clubs for initial fees totalling something over £4.2 million, and high earners Marlon King, Peter Løvenkrands, Hayden Mullins and Darren Ambrose were told they were free to leave if they could find another club, though as in previous transfer windows, there were no takers for Nikola Žigić, who had one year left on his contract.

Clark was able to attract several out-of-contract signings: Ireland international goalkeeper Darren Randolph from Motherwell, Scottish Player of the Year-shortlisted Andrew Shinnie, an attacking midfielder from Inverness Caledonian Thistle, Blackpool right-back Neal Eardley, young midfielder Tom Adeyemi from Norwich City, forward Lee Novak, who had worked with Clark at Huddersfield Town, and Conference top scorer Matt Green from Mansfield Town. Clark also utilised the loan market, bringing in young centre-backs Kyle Bartley from Swansea City and Fulham's Dan Burn, attacking midfielder Scott Allan from West Bromwich Albion, and Newcastle United wing-back Shane Ferguson, who had spent time on loan at Birmingham in 2012–13.

The home kit consisted of a royal blue shirt with broad white front panel in a "penguin" style, with white shorts and royal blue socks. The away strip had a yellow shirt with navy trim and navy shorts and socks. Adult shirts bore the logo of Nicolites, a Birmingham-based manufacturer of electronic cigarettes, while junior shirts carried the logo of Help Harry Help Others, a local cancer charity. The kit was produced by Diadora. The club decided it would not be viable to open the upper tier of the Gil Merrick Stand at St Andrew's for the 2013–14 season.

Pre-season match details
Date	Opponents	Venue	Result	Score F–A	Scorers	Attendance	Refs
6 July 2013	Alfreton Town	A	W	3–1	Lee 20', Westwood 32' o.g., Shinnie 47'	793	
8 July 2013	Shamrock Rovers	A	W	4–0	Novak 18', Žigić 36', Reilly 44', Green 60'	1,500 (est)	
10 July 2013	Milton Keynes Dons	A	L	1–4	Arthur 34'	*	
17 July 2013	Swindon Town	A	W	3–0	Novak (2) 40', 58', Shinnie 86'	1,433	
20 July 2013	Oxford United	A	D	1–1	McGurk (trialist) 43'	2,394	
23 July 2013	Shrewsbury Town	A	L	2–4	Green 46', Burke 70'	2,037	
27 July 2013	Hull City	H	W	2–1	Green 12', Shinnie 47'	5,252	

- Match played behind closed doors

== Football League Championship ==
=== August–September ===
The opening-day fixture, at home to last season's playoff finalists Watford, was preceded by a minute's silence in memory of Christian Benítez, who died at the age of 27 on 29 July in a Qatar hospital of cardiorespiratory failure caused by a degenerative defect in a coronary artery. "Chucho" played in the 2009–10 Birmingham team that produced a club record 15-match unbeaten run and finished ninth in the Premier League – their best finish for more than 50 years – and was a member of the starting eleven that was selected unchanged for a Premier League record 12 consecutive matches.

Birmingham lined up against Watford in a 3–5–2 formation, with six debutant free-transfer signings, three loanees (a fourth, Scott Allan, came on as a second-half substitute), and two 34-year-olds. Nikola Žigić was unavailable through injury. The difference between the teams lay in their finishing. Matt Green missed with only the goalkeeper to beat, Wade Elliott's powerful shot from distance was deflected onto the crossbar, and Dan Burn might have scored twice late on. Troy Deeney played a one-two with Fernando Forestieri and scored the only goal of the game with a low shot into the far corner after 11 minutes. For Birmingham's 2000th match in the second tier of English football, and Yeovil Town's first home game at that level, Hayden Mullins replaced Kyle Bartley in the starting eleven, playing at centre-half rather than his customary central midfield. The only goal of the game came just after half-time; Shane Ferguson's corner kick caused chaos as Byron Webster's attempted clearance rebounded off Danny Seaborne for an own goal. The goal was originally credited to Burn, who had scored the winner for Yeovil in the 2013 playoff final. Darren Randolph made a double save in the first half, and turned Webster's powerful header onto the bar with his leg in the second.

Clark selected midfielder Allan instead of Green for the visit of Brighton & Hove Albion, who had lost their three games so far, so there was no recognised striker alongside the hard-working Lee Novak. After a goalless first half, first Andy Shinnie and then Novak hit the crossbar with shots from distance. Randolph kept out a powerful shot from former Birmingham loanee Kemy Agustien, then the same player fed Andrew Crofts to score the only goal of the game; Clark was disappointed by his team's failure to close the move down. Marlon King's contract was terminated by mutual consent ahead of the transfer window closing. Peter Løvenkrands, who had also been made available on a free transfer and had played no previous part on a matchday, partnered Novak in attack as, for the first time this season, Clark set the team up in a 4–4–2 formation. With Paul Robinson at left back, Bartley at centre back, and a first league start of the season for Chris Burke, Birmingham conceded after half an hour to Ipswich Town's Christophe Berra's header, and Randolph made several saves before Burke's deflected shot saved a point. Neal Eardley left the field soon after the opening goal with an apparently serious knee injury.

Queens Park Rangers manager Harry Redknapp thought that Birmingham were the better side in the first half. Novak headed against a goalpost, the unmarked Shinnie shot over an open goal when played in by Novak, Jonathan Spector's neat finish was disallowed for offside, and the same player was booked for diving when apparently tripped in the penalty area by Richard Dunne. Birmingham lost 1–0 when Tom Adeyemi's sliced clearance rebounded off the underside of the crossbar to Charlie Austin. Play was interrupted by a blue smoke bomb thrown from the visitors' end. Without suspended captain Paul Robinson, Birmingham lost 3–0 at Burnley, a poor performance enlivened by the debut of 17-year-old Academy midfielder Reece Brown.

David Murphy made his return from ten months out with a knee problem in the home match with fellow strugglers Sheffield Wednesday, for whom former Birmingham centre-half Roger Johnson was making his first appearance. A more spectacular debut was that of Manchester United loanee Jesse Lingard. Going straight into Birmingham's starting eleven wearing number 9, Lingard scored his first senior goal after 20 minutes when goalkeeper Chris Kirkland parried Burke's shot, completed his hat-trick 13 minutes later, and scored a fourth in the second half. Reality resumed away at Reading, where Callum Reilly made his first start of the season, and Birmingham lost to two Danny Guthrie free kicks.

=== October–November ===
Ten minutes into the match at home to Millwall, Birmingham were awarded a penalty for a foul on Lingard outside the area; Lingard's kick was saved. By half-time, Murphy had given Birmingham the lead, converting Shinnie's cross from a narrow angle and hitting a characteristic free kick from distance. After Adeyemi chipped a parried shot back over the goalkeeper, Murphy came close to completing his hat-trick with another free kick before Lingard's late header made the final score 4–0. The up-and-down nature of Birmingham's season continued at home to Bolton Wanderers, when Burn's failure to react to a clearance allowed Jermaine Beckford a clear run from the halfway line, and former Blues player Neil Danns took advantage of Randolph misjudging a cross. A header initially credited to Žigić was apparently touched over the line by Novak, and a strong appeal for a penalty, when Reilly's shot struck Liam Feeney's raised hands, was turned down.

Without Adeyemi and Reilly because of illness, Olly Lee made his Championship debut, and Dan Burn was substituted at half time after a poor team performance in which Leeds United scored three times. With Shinnie and Žigić on the field, Birmingham improved in the second half, but were unable to take their chances, and the match finished 4–0. At Derby County, a game of numerous chances saw Novak equalise with his first touch, watching a high cross from Caddis down to hit "a sweet sidefoot volley" past the goalkeeper.

After a fine performance in a losing cause in the League Cup in midweek, Birmingham's players struggled in their next league encounter. Winger Demarai Gray made his first start, Burn's early goal was disallowed when the referee decided that Novak had fouled the goalkeeper, and Løvenkrands hit a late chance well over the bar, but Randolph's 57th-minute double save needed to be a triple, Charlton Athletic scored, and Birmingham dropped into the relegation zone. Žigić opened the scoring at Huddersfield Town when he was first to the rebound from an 11th-minute shot by Novak, making his first return to his former club, and Anthony Gerrard equalised 20 minutes later. In the second half, Kyle Bartley, preferred to the previously ever-present Burn, scored twice with headed goals from set-pieces, briefly stepped over the advertising hoardings in celebration of the second, and was sent off for a second yellow card.

Polish international Dariusz Dudka nearly marked his debut against Blackpool with a goal, and Burn risked injury blocking Tom Ince's shot against the goalpost, as Lingard was Birmingham's only scorer in a 1–1 draw despite late chances for Novak and Gray. Paul Caddis scored his first goals for Birmingham at Barnsley, with a run and 25-yard (23 m) shot and a penalty after Žigić was fouled, and his pass was deflected to Zigic who touched it over former Birmingham goalkeeper Jack Butland to complete a 3–0 win and finish November in 19th place in the table.

=== December–January ===
Novak converted Hancox's cross to take the lead at home to Doncaster Rovers, but the lowest league attendance of the season, officially announced as 12,663, saw David Cotterill's "unstoppable 30-yard effort" give the visitors a draw and take Birmingham's run without a home win to nine weeks. Substitute Chris Burke, a half-time replacement for loan striker Aaron Mclean, played a major role in earning Birmingham a draw at home to Middlesbrough. After Jonathan Woodgate narrowly failed to head past his own goalkeeper, Burke was fouled for a penalty, converted by Caddis to tie the scores. Middlesbrough regained the lead when Birmingham failed to clear a corner, then in the 94th minute Kyle Bartley met Burke's corner with a powerful header to equalise. With Mitch Hancox injured against Middlesbrough and Robinson and Burn nearing suspensions, young defenders Will Packwood and Amari'i Bell were recalled from loan, and Bell was included on the bench, for the visit to AFC Bournemouth. Andy Shinnie's first league goal, from Lee's precise cross, and Žigić's neat finish from Lingard's through ball gave Birmingham a 2–0 win, despite the home side's massive superiority of possession and shots.

Reduced ticket prices attracted the largest crowd of the season so far, of 23,497, to an exciting but goalless encounter with Nottingham Forest in which Nikola Žigić failed to take chances and Forest's Darius Henderson was sent off for a foul on Robinson, who was booked for his reaction. In a rather less exciting goalless draw at Wigan Athletic, Lingard reacted to being refused a free kick with a wild tackle on Jordi Gómez for which he was sent off, which meant he would be suspended for the last two matches of his loan spell. Birmingham took a 3–0 first-half lead at Blackburn Rovers, with two goals from Novak, the second a "piledriver" from upwards of 30 yards (27 m), and a clever shot by Burke from the edge of the penalty area, and held on to win 3–2 to finish 2013 on a nine-match unbeaten run.

At home to Barnsley, Birmingham took the lead early on when Žigić tapped in Callum Reilly's cross, and soon afterwards Dan Burn headed against the bar, but despite numerous missed chances Barnsley equalised via a second-half free kick to stretch Birmingham's winless run at home to three months. By the next match, ten days later, Birmingham had lost Dudka, who reportedly expressed surprise at the pace of the game in the Championship and whose contract had not been extended, Lingard and Mclean, whose loans had expired, Bartley, who injured a hamstring against Barnsley, and Burn, recalled for assessment by new Fulham manager Rene Meulensteen. Clark gave 18-year-old midfielder Charlee Adams a squad number and included him in the travelling party, though not in the matchday squad. Hancox returned from injury at left back, and defensive midfielder Hayden Mullins made his first start since August, partnering Robinson at centre back. Birmingham lost to a single goal, after the defence were unable to clear Randolph's initial save. Reece Brown made a positive contribution as a second-half substitute, earning himself a start in the FA Cup third-round tie and a first league start at home to Yeovil Town. Brown was man of the match and new signing Brian Howard made a promising debut in a 2–0 defeat, the first goal resulting from Mullins' attempt to head the ball back to Randolph succeeding only in finding James Hayter. Novak headed against the bar, Brown, Burke and Howard drew smart saves from Marek Stech, but Birmingham were uncertain in defence and indecisive in attack.

Without Robinson, suspended for two matches after receiving his tenth yellow card, Hancox, who injured an ankle shortly before the game, and Žigić, dropped, Bartley returned from injury and Birmingham gave a debut to 19-year-old left back Amari'i Bell and first league starts of the season to Will Packwood and loanee Albert Rusnák for the visit of Leicester City. Paul Caddis took over the captaincy. In the first half, Birmingham were "relentlessly battered" by the league leaders, though conceded only once, and after Løvenkrands replaced Lee at half time, they "played with more verve and imagination". After they failed to force the ball home in a goalmouth scramble, Leicester broke at pace and Jamie Vardy increased the lead. Løvenkrands scored late on with a header from Burke's cross and Rusnák had a chance for an unlikely draw, but Leicester won their eighth successive game and Birmingham extended their winless run at home in the league to four months.

=== February–March ===
Birmingham faced Derby County with three debutant loanees in the starting eleven: Tom Thorpe at centre-half sustained an ankle injury after only 11 minutes of his first senior match that was to force his return to owning club Manchester United – he was replaced by new permanent signing Aaron Martin – Tyler Blackett at left back conceded a first-half penalty that Randolph saved, and Emyr Huws was involved in the last goal of a 3–3 draw. Brian Howard opened the scoring just after half-time with a header from a corner, but Derby equalised within a minute and then took a two-goal lead. A shot from a fifth debutant, substitute Federico Macheda, was pushed out by the goalkeeper but only to Burke who scored with a left-foot curled shot from the edge of the area, before in the 93rd minute Huws touched a corner onto the post and Macheda tied the scores from the rebound. Two goals from Macheda, a header from Huws's first-half free kick and a 79th-minute shot after Adeyemi's strong run, completed a 2–0 win at Charlton Athletic. Burke and Caddis each hit the frame of the goal before poor defending allowed Troy Deeney two attempts to score the only goal of the visit to Watford via a deflection off Paul Robinson. Packwood came close to a stoppage-time equaliser when he placed a header just wide.

The 2–1 defeat at home to Huddersfield Town – Birmingham's goal came in the 95th minute from Lee's half-volley from a knockdown by Žigić, included in the matchday squad for the first time since the Yeovil defeat – equalled the 50-year-old club record of 11 home league matches without a win. According to the Birmingham Mail reporter, they were "insipid, weak, lacking drive, cohesion and generated no sort of danger." Jonathan Spector and Mitch Hancox returned from injury and Robinson replaced Martin at centre half for the visit to Blackpool. After failure to deal with a corner had allowed the home side to open the scoring, Clark brought on Žigić in place of Adeyemi at half-time. After Žigić made a weak attempt to chip the goalkeeper, his knockdown allowed Novak to equalise with a fierce deflected drive. Shortly afterwards, loanee Jordon Ibe replaced Burke, who suffered a head injury when apparently fouled in the penalty area. Jack Robinson, Ibe's Liverpool clubmate, was sent off for bringing him down when his pacy direct run had taken him through on goal, Birmingham took advantage of their extra man and Novak headed the winner from Huws's precise cross.

Birmingham started the 1–0 defeat at Ipswich Town with three strikers and no wingers; according to Jonathan Spector, "we didn't really have the quality going forward, that we need to win the game". Ravel Morrison, on loan at Birmingham the previous season, returned with Queens Park Rangers to score twice and extend the non-winning streak to a club record twelve matches. In front of a midweek crowd of 16,695, boosted by cheap tickets in all parts of the ground, Birmingham came from behind three times to draw 3–3 with second-placed Burnley, who first took the lead when Spector directed a headed clearance across rather than away from goal. Second-half substitute Macheda scored four minutes after entering the game, Emyr Huws produced his first senior goal, a well-struck volley from upwards of 20 yards (18 m), and in the 94th minute, Macheda forced the ball over the line using what the Burnley players claimed was arm rather than chest. After the match, Clark said he intended to report referee James Linington for "mocking" Paul Robinson with a reference to the scoreline after cautioning the player for dissent: Burnley had just scored their second from a disputed free kick conceded by Robinson.

Three days later, a 4–1 defeat in a flat performance at Sheffield Wednesday kept Birmingham 19th in the table. Left-back Tyler Blackett was substituted after only 24 minutes, after the second goal went in, Robinson's half-time departure with concussion weakened an already porous defence, Packwood's neat finish into his own goal gave Wednesday a third, and Huws' hip injury left Birmingham with ten men for the last few minutes. An improved showing at home to Reading still resulted in defeat. Huws lasted only half an hour before aggravating his injury, Reading scored on the break, and Caddis equalised from the penalty spot after Reilly, who had begun the match at left back rather than his usual central midfield, was fouled. In the second half, Macheda headed against the crossbar, Žigić, Ibe and Burke drew saves or last-ditch blocks, and Žigić's far-post header was disallowed because the corner was judged to have curved out of play, but Reading scored after 82 minutes, again on the break, and that one counted. The traditionally high-scoring visit to fellow strugglers Millwall did not disappoint. Jordon Ibe's first Birmingham goal was equalised when Steve Morison's shot went in off Robinson, but Shinnie's header from Blackett's cross regained the lead before half-time. Millwall were denied a penalty when Robinson appeared to handle, and Žigić headed home Burke's cross soon afterwards. Millwall's all-out attack at the end produced a penalty for a foul by Aaron Martin, but Birmingham held on. They were three goals down at home to Bournemouth after 28 minutes, and a fourth soon after the interval. Substitute Macheda scored twice, but Birmingham went into April 20th in the table and without a home win in six months.

=== April–May ===
Tom Thorpe started his second loan spell with the visit to fellow strugglers Doncaster Rovers, where two second-half goals by Macheda and one from Novak gave Birmingham a 3–1 win which took them into 18th place, above Doncaster on goal difference. In an open game at Middlesbrough, both sides had chances before the home team scored twice in two minutes, shortly afterwards Emyr Huws "simply looked up and arched a dipping thunderbolt under the bar from 35 yards", which won the club's Goal of the Season award, and despite the dismissal of two players in the last ten minutes, Middlesbrough scored a third. Novak suffered a knee injury in first-half stoppage time that looked to have ended his season. Former Birmingham loanee Matt Derbyshire's second-minute goal separated the sides at Nottingham Forest, though an "outstanding" save from Robinson's powerful header denied Birmingham what skysports.com suggested would have been an undeserved equaliser.

Three home games followed. In the absence of Paul Robinson, who was serving a three-match suspension for accumulating 15 bookings, Clark gave the captaincy to Chris Burke and reshuffled the defence, selecting right-back Caddis in central midfield, centre-back Packwood at right back, left-back Blackett in the centre and central midfielder Reilly at left back. Blackburn Rovers' Rudy Gestede missed an open goal before giving the visitors a 2–0 lead, increased a few minutes later when Blackett deflected a shot past Randolph. Although some stability was achieved when Žigić replaced Howard and the defensive players returned to their natural positions, Gestede completed a hat-trick of headers in first-half stoppage time. Hancox replaced Blackett at half-time, Žigić headed home Reilly's cross, Demarai Gray scored his first senior goal, and Birmingham played the last quarter-hour with ten men after Huws suffered a deep cut to the head that required eight stitches. The defeat left Birmingham outside the relegation places only on goal difference, albeit with a game in hand on those below.

At the press conference ahead of the visit of Leeds United, Robinson echoed Clark's previously expressed views on loan signings – that although the financial situation forced an over-reliance on loans, it was an inherently unstable way to construct a squad, running the risk of committed and successful loanees being recalled to play at a higher level, as happened with Burn and Bartley – and highlighted the relative lack of contribution of the later loan signings, saying that "For me, personally, the second lot have let us down a little bit". He clarified later in the interview that not all the later batch fell into that category, and that he thought it was a generational problem, of young players wanting the footballer lifestyle without the hard work. Jonathan Spector returned at centre half, Novak declared himself fit to start, and Huws played wearing a protective headband. Birmingham survived until just short of the hour, when Matt Smith – whose father Ian played for Birmingham in the 1970s – and Danny Pugh scored in a two-minute spell, and then Caddis turned a cross past Randolph. Scott Allan, making his first appearance in eight months, played a fine ball for Macheda to make the final score 3–1, and Birmingham dropped into the relegation places.

With Packwood injured, and Thorpe having suffered a recurrence of the ankle injury that ended his first loan spell, Hayden Mullins was recalled from Notts County to partner Spector at centre half in the last home match of the season, against Wigan Athletic. Still with a game in hand on those around them, Clark was confident of gaining the four points he believed would be enough for safety. In front of a 20,427 crowd – their second-highest attendance of the season – Birmingham conceded inside the first three minutes when Jordi Gomez and Callum McManaman exploited space on the right side of the defence. Despite increasingly frantic attacking play from the home team, Wigan secured the win they needed to make sure of a playoff place, Birmingham extended their winless run at home to a second-tier record of 18 games, and left themselves needing at least a point from the last match, away to Bolton Wanderers, and for other results to favour them.

Clark selected experienced players to start at Bolton, with Spector at right back, Caddis in midfield, and Burke and Novak supporting Žigić in attack; the only loanee was Huws in midfield. Mullins made a "brilliant interception" to prevent Jermaine Beckford scoring, and the match was goalless at half-time. Hancox replaced the injured Huws, and when Bolton took the lead just short of the hour, Clark brought on Macheda and Ibe for Reilly and Burke. Within a minute of Doncaster Rovers going a goal behind to Leicester City, which meant a draw would be enough for Birmingham to stay up, Lucas Jutkiewicz beat Randolph at his near post to put Bolton 2–0 up. Two minutes later, Žigić headed home from Hancox's precise cross. For the remaining twelve minutes and into stoppage time, Birmingham attacked relentlessly. In the 93rd minute, Ibe's shot fell to Žigić, his header was cleared off the line by Tim Ream, who was unable to reset himself to prevent the 5 ft 7 in (1.70 m) Paul Caddis reaching the rebound and cushioning a header over the line from 4 yards (3.7 m), and Birmingham stayed up on goal difference. Caddis claimed afterwards that it was the first headed goal he had ever scored, and that the team gained extra motivation from "when we were 2–0 down, the first thing we heard was our fans singing".

=== Match results ===
General source: Match content not verifiable from these sources is referenced individually.

Date	League position	Opponents	Venue	Result	Score; F–A	Scorers	Attendance	Refs
3 August 2013	20th	Watford	H	L	0–1		18,830	
10 August 2013	13th	Yeovil Town	A	W	1–0	Seaborne 48' o.g.	8,717	
17 August 2013	17th	Brighton & Hove Albion	H	L	0–1		14,885	
24 August 2013	18th	Leicester City	A	L	2–3	Green 12', Burke 90+4'	21,229	
31 August 2013	19th	Ipswich Town	H	D	1–1	Burke 76'	14,328	
14 September 2013	20th	Queens Park Rangers	A	L	0–1		16,953	
17 September 2013	21st	Burnley	A	L	0–3		9,641	
21 September 2013	19th	Sheffield Wednesday	H	W	4–1	Lingard (4) 20', 29', 33', 51'	14,379	
28 September 2013	19th	Reading	A	L	0–2		18,252	
1 October 2013	17th	Millwall	H	W	4–0	Murphy (2) 19', 34', Adeyemi 68', Lingard 89'	13,133	
5 October 2013	19th	Bolton Wanderers	H	L	1–2	Novak 69'	13,627	
20 October 2013	20th	Leeds United	A	L	0–4		21,301	
26 October 2013	19th	Derby County	A	D	1–1	Novak 66'	27,141	
2 November 2013	22nd	Charlton Athletic	H	L	0–1		14,070	
9 November 2013	18th	Huddersfield Town	A	W	3–1	Žigić 11', Bartley (2) 66', 81'	14,161	
23 November 2013	20th	Blackpool	H	D	1–1	Lingard 27'	14,480	
30 November 2013	19th	Barnsley	A	W	3–0	Caddis (2) 13', 22' pen., Žigić 37'	10,077	
4 December 2013	17th	Doncaster Rovers	H	D	1–1	Novak 29'	12,663	
7 December 2013	19th	Middlesbrough	H	D	2–2	Caddis 59' pen., Bartley 90+4'	13,454	
14 December 2013	14th	AFC Bournemouth	A	W	2–0	Shinnie 3', Žigić 34'	9,256	
21 December 2013	16th	Nottingham Forest	H	D	0–0		23,497	
26 December 2013	18th	Wigan Athletic	A	D	0–0		14,996	
29 December 2013	17th	Blackburn Rovers	A	W	3–2	Novak (2) 12′, 18′, Burke 36′	14,344	
1 January 2014	17th	Barnsley	H	D	1–1	Žigić 10'	14,422	
11 January 2014	17th	Brighton & Hove Albion	A	L	0–1		26,796	
18 January 2014	17th	Yeovil Town	H	L	0–2		13,605	
28 January 2014	17th	Leicester City	H	L	1–2	Løvenkrands 90'	14,763	
1 February 2014	18th	Derby County	H	D	3–3	Howard 48', Burke 78, Macheda 90+3'	15,224	
8 February 2014	18th	Charlton Athletic	A	W	2–0	Macheda (2) 22', 79'	15,878	
11 February 2014	18th	Watford	A	L	0–1		13,904	
15 February 2014	18th	Huddersfield Town	H	L	1–2	Lee 90+5'	14,112	
22 February 2014	16th	Blackpool	A	W	2–1	Novak (2) 63', 82'	14,628	
1 March 2014	17th	Ipswich Town	A	L	0–1		15,596	
8 March 2014	18th	Queens Park Rangers	H	L	0–2		14,500	
12 March 2014	19th	Burnley	H	D	3–3	Macheda (2) 64', 90+4', Huws 69'	16,695	
15 March 2014	19th	Sheffield Wednesday	A	L	1–4	Novak 80'	20,637	
22 March 2014	20th	Reading	H	L	1–2	Caddis 43' pen	13,409	
25 March 2014	19th	Millwall	A	W	3–2	Ibe 18', Shinnie 35', Žigić 52'	9,268	
29 March 2014	20th	AFC Bournemouth	H	L	2–4	Macheda (2) 57', 73'	13,875	
5 April 2014	18th	Doncaster Rovers	A	W	3–1	Macheda (2) 57', 76', Novak 71'	9,206	
8 April 2014	18th	Middlesbrough	A	L	1–3	Huws 37'	13,399	
19 April 2014	18th	Nottingham Forest	A	L	0–1		21,300	
21 April 2014	21st	Blackburn Rovers	H	L	2–4	Žigić 63', Gray 84'	17,291	
26 April 2014	22nd	Leeds United	H	L	1–3	Macheda 83'	19,861	
29 April 2014	22nd	Wigan Athletic	H	L	0–1		20,427	
3 May 2014	21st	Bolton Wanderers	A	D	2–2	Žigić 78', Caddis 90+3'	19,558	

=== League table ===
Pos	Team	Pld	W	D	L	GF	GA	GD	Pts	Promotion, qualification or relegation
19	Millwall	46	11	15	20	46	74	−28	48	
20	Blackpool	46	11	13	22	38	66	−28	46	
21	Birmingham City	46	11	11	24	58	74	−16	44	
22	Doncaster Rovers (R)	46	11	11	24	39	70	−31	44	Relegation to Football League One
23	Barnsley (R)	46	9	12	25	44	77	−33	39	Relegation to Football League One

Rules for classification: 1) points; 2) goal difference; 3) number of goals scored
(R) Relegated

=== Results summary ===
Overall								Home						Away					
Pld	W	D	L	GF	GA	GD	Pts	W	D	L	GF	GA	GD	W	D	L	GF	GA	GD
46	11	11	24	58	74	−16	44	2	8	13	29	40	−11	9	3	11	29	34	−5

== FA Cup ==
Along with all clubs in the top two divisions, Birmingham entered the FA Cup at the third-round stage. They were drawn at home to the winners of the replay between Bristol Rovers and Crawley Town, which Rovers won 2–1 at the third attempt after one abandonment and one postponement because of Crawley's waterlogged pitch. Because that match was once abandoned and once postponed because of Crawley's waterlogged pitch, the draw for the fourth round had already been made, and Clark impressed on his players the financial necessity of progressing in the competition to meet Premier League club Swansea City at home. A strong Birmingham side took a first-half lead via Paul Robinson's first goal for five years, but failed to make sure of the win until Burke scored twice near the end. Charlee Adams made a brief senior debut. Against Swansea, Novak headed home after 15 minutes, but this time Birmingham's inability to consolidate a lead was punished by half-time substitute Wilfried Bony's two goals.

FA Cup match details
Round	Date	Opponents	Venue	Result	Score; F–A	Scorers	Attendance	Refs
Third round	14 January 2014	Bristol Rovers	H	W	3–0	Robinson 35', Burke (2) 85', 87'	9,914	
Fourth round	25 January 2014	Swansea City	H	L	1–2	Novak 15'	11,490	

== Football League Cup ==
Birmingham began their League Cup campaign at the first-round stage, at home to League Two club Plymouth Argyle. Burke missed an open goal, and Novak's penalty was saved, as Scott Allan twice gave Birmingham a lead that was twice pegged back by Lewis Alessandra. Two minutes into extra time, Kyle Bartley converted Burke's corner, and Birmingham held on. The visit to Yeovil Town in the second round had its share of controversy. With Birmingham 2–1 ahead in the last minute of normal time, goalkeeper Colin Doyle kicked the ball out of play because of an injury to Dan Burn. When play resumed, Yeovil's Byron Webster took the ball on and scored, with Birmingham expecting the ball to be returned to them. A confrontation followed between both sets of players, in which Burn, who had had a successful loan spell at Yeovil the previous season, was prominent. After Yeovil took the lead in extra time, they immediately allowed Novak to "walk in" an equaliser unchallenged. The game went to a penalty shootout, won 3–2 by the visitors after Adeyemi's penalty came down off the crossbar, struck the goalkeeper on the back, and trickled over the line.

The third round was less eventful. After cup-holders Swansea City had struck the frame of the goal in the first half, Birmingham outplayed them in the second, completing a 3–1 win with goals from Burn, Matt Green and Adeyemi. Premier League club Stoke City were the visitors in the fourth round. The score was 1–1 just before half-time when Wade Elliott appeared to elbow a Stoke player and was sent off. With a man advantage, Stoke led 3–1 with five minutes of normal time left, when substitute Peter Lovenkrands scored twice to force extra time. Kenwyne Jones regained the lead for Stoke, but in the 118th minute, Olly Lee beat the goalkeeper from distance to take the match into a shootout. Hancox and Reilly missed the first two penalties for Birmingham, and Stoke won the shootout 4–2.

League Cup match details
Round	Date	Opponents	Venue	Result	Score; F–A	Scorers	Attendance	Refs
First round	6 August 2013	Plymouth Argyle	H	W	3–2; a.e.t.	Allan (2) 49', 84, Bartley 92'	10,178	
Second round	27 August 2013	Yeovil Town	A	D	3–3 a.e.t.; 3–2 pens.	Bartley 20', Shinnie 44', Novak 106' Burke, Ambrose, Adeyemi	3,769	
Third round	25 September 2013	Swansea City	H	W	3–1	Burn 57', Green 61', Adeyemi 81'	7,470	
Fourth round	29 October 2013	Stoke City	H	D	4–4 a.e.t.; 2–4 pens.	Adeyemi 28', Løvenkrands (2) 85', 90+3', Lee 118' Løvenkrands, Lee.	13,436	

== Off the field ==
The trial of club president Carson Yeung on five charges of money-laundering between 2001 and 2007 in relation to sums totalling HK$721 million (£55M) had begun in Hong Kong in May 2013. After numerous delays, he was found guilty some nine months later. Trial judge Douglas Yau found him "not a witness of truth. I find that he is someone who is prepared to, and did try to, lie whenever he saw the need to do so". He was sentenced to six years' imprisonment, and filed notice of appeal.

As the season began, progress had been made on satisfying the preconditions for trading in shares of holding company Birmingham International Holdings (BIH) to resume on the Hong Kong Stock Exchange (HKSE). The company took out a loan for reasons of liquidity on 1 August, and weeks later announced attempts to restructure existing debt and the intention of seeking more loan finance for both company and club.

In November, Yeung had agreed to write off a £15M loan to the club in return for shares in BIH. He resigned from all positions with both club and holding company on 4 February, and within days, trading resumed in BIH shares after two-and-a-half years suspension. In consequence, the Football League were "satisfied that Birmingham City complies with its requirements regarding ownership, as well as having funding arrangements in place until at least the end of the 2013/14 season", and after BIH vice-chairman Ma Shui Cheong (Yeung's brother-in-law) and investment banker Panos Pavlakis (his future brother-in-law) joined Yeung's son on the football club board, Pannu insisted that Yeung would not be exerting any influence by proxy over the running of the club.

Up to five groups were reportedly interested in buying the club, but BIH were willing only to dispose of tranches, as sale of the whole club would leave the company with no business and hence they would lose their HKSE listing again. BIH confirmed on 27 May that a non-binding offer for 24% of the club had been received. Despite Pannu's statement that the bidder was a "British consortium with a very strong North American investment fund", but no further detail could be released because of "non-disclosure agreements and HKSE regulations". former Swindon Town F.C. chairman Jeremy Wray stated two days later that a company with which he was involved, Soccer Management Worldwide, was the preferred bidder and had three weeks exclusive access to conduct due diligence.

== Aftermath ==
Captain Paul Robinson won both Fans' and Players' Player of the Season awards. Tom Adeyemi was Young Player of the Season, and Demarai Gray was Academy Player of the Year. Lee Novak was leading goalscorer, while loanee Federico Macheda was top league scorer with 10 from only 18 matches. According to the Observer's Richard Gibson, "the difference between Championship and League One status ... can conservatively be estimated at £20m when taking sponsorship, television money and gate receipts into consideration." Birmingham reduced the wage bill by releasing senior players Ambrose, Elliott, Løvenkrands and Mullins, as well as short-term signings Howard and Martin, and Burke and Žigić left the club after rejecting new contracts offered on significantly reduced terms. Including loanees and young professionals, 19 players left the club at the end of the season. While Clark recognised the problems inherent in such a turnover of players, there was as yet no evidence of enough incoming finance to support a less short-termist strategy.

== Transfers ==
=== In ===
Date	Player	Club†	Fee	Ref
1 July 2013	Tom Adeyemi	(Norwich City)	Free	
1 July 2013	Neal Eardley	(Blackpool)	Free	
1 July 2013	Lee Novak	(Huddersfield Town)	Free	
1 July 2013	Darren Randolph	(Motherwell)	Free	
1 July 2013	Andrew Shinnie	(Inverness Caledonian Thistle)	Free	
3 July 2013	Matt Green	(Mansfield Town)	Free	
31 October 2013	Dariusz Dudka	(Levante)	Free	
14 January 2014	Brian Howard	(CSKA Sofia)	Free	
30 January 2014	Aaron Martin	(Southampton)	Free	

† Brackets round club names indicate the player's contract with that club had expired before he joined Birmingham.

=== Out ===
Date	Player	Fee	Joined†	Ref
25 June 2013	Curtis Davies	Undisclosed	Hull City	
4 July 2013	Nathan Redmond	Undisclosed	Norwich City	
28 August 2013	Marlon King	Mutual consent	(Sheffield United)	
2 September 2013	Eddy Gnahoré	Mutual consent	(Carrarese)	
1 January 2014	Dariusz Dudka	Released	(Wisła Kraków)	
3 March 2014	David Murphy	Retired		
30 June 2014	Akwasi Asante	Released	(Kidderminster Harriers)	
30 June 2014	Darren Ambrose	Released	(Ipswich Town)	
30 June 2014	Wade Elliott	Released	(Bristol City)	
30 June 2014	Reece Hales	Released	(Kidderminster Harriers)	
30 June 2014	Ryan Higgins	Released	(AFC Telford United)	
30 June 2014	Brian Howard	Released	(Oxford United)	
30 June 2014	Peter Løvenkrands	Released		
30 June 2014	Aaron Martin	Released	(Yeovil Town)	
30 June 2014	Hayden Mullins	Released	(Notts County)	
30 June 2014	Chris Burke	Contract expired	(Nottingham Forest)	
30 June 2014	Nikola Žigić	Contract expired	(Birmingham City)	

† Brackets round a club denote the player joined that club after his Birmingham City contract expired.

=== Loan in ===
Date	Player	Club	Return	Ref
2 July 2013	Kyle Bartley	Swansea City	Recalled 29 January 2014	
3 July 2013	Dan Burn	Fulham	Recalled 2 January 2014	
19 July 2013	Scott Allan	West Bromwich Albion	End of season	
23 July 2013	Shane Ferguson	Newcastle United	End of season	
19 September 2013	Jesse Lingard	Manchester United	1 January 2014	
21 November 2013	Aaron Mclean	Hull City	1 January 2014	
21 January 2014	Albert Rusnák	Manchester City	22 February 2014	
28 January 2014	Emyr Huws	Manchester City	1 March 2014	
31 January 2014	Tom Thorpe	Manchester United	Recalled 3 March 2014	
31 January 2014	Tyler Blackett	Manchester United	End of season	
31 January 2014	Federico Macheda	Manchester United	End of season	
21 February 2014	Jordon Ibe	Liverpool	End of season	
28 March 2014	Tom Thorpe	Manchester United	End of season	

=== Loan out ===
Date	Player	Club	Return	Ref
9 July 2013	Amari'i Bell	Nuneaton Town	Recalled 20 September 2013	
13 July 2013	Akwasi Asante	Shrewsbury Town	19 August 2013	
27 September 2013	Amari'i Bell	Nuneaton Town	Recalled 9 December 2013	
27 September 2013	James Fry	Leamington	29 October 2013	
15 October 2013	Reece Hales	Worcester City	12 November 2013	
17 October 2013	Will Packwood	Bristol Rovers	Recalled 11 December 2013	
18 October 2013	Ryan Higgins	Tamworth	13 November 2013	
27 December 2013	Ryan Higgins	Leamington	26 April 2014	
14 January 2014	Darren Ambrose	Apollon Smyrnis	End of season	
28 January 2014	Wade Elliott	Bristol City	1 March 2014	
31 January 2014	Hayden Mullins	Notts County	Recalled 28 April 2014	
31 January 2014	Charlee Adams	Lincoln City	End of season	
13 February 2014	Nick Townsend	Lincoln City	End of season	
6 March 2014	Amari'i Bell	Kidderminster Harriers	End of season	
14 March 2014	Callum Preston	Worcester City	Work experience	
21 March 2014	Koby Arthur	Lincoln City	End of season	

== Appearances and goals ==
Numbers in parentheses denote appearances as substitute.
Players with squad numbers struck through and marked † left the club during the playing season.
Players with names in italics and marked * were on loan from another club for the whole of their season with Birmingham.
Players listed with no appearances have been in the matchday squad but only as unused substitutes.
Key to positions: GK – Goalkeeper; DF – Defender; MF – Midfielder; FW – Forward

Players included in matchday squads
No.	Pos.	Nat.	Name	League		FA Cup		League Cup		Total		Discipline	
No.	Pos.	Nat.	Name	Apps	Goals	Apps	Goals	Apps	Goals	Apps	Goals	A yellow rectangle, denoting the yellow penalty card shown to a player being cautioned	A red rectangle, denoting the red penalty card shown to a player being sent off
1	GK	IRE	Darren Randolph	46	0	0	0	0	0	46	0	2	0
2	DF	WAL	Neal Eardley	5	0	0	0	2	0	7	0	3	0
3	DF	ENG	~~David Murphy~~ †	6	2	0	0	0	0	6	2	0	0
4	DF	ENG	Paul Robinson	40	0	2	1	3 (1)	0	45 (1)	1	16 (Note: The Football League website omits one yellow card for Robinson. As of 28 January 2014, it showed him with 9 yellow cards, but on that date he began a two-match suspension for receiving 10 yellows.)	0
~~5~~	DF	ENG	~~Kyle Bartley~~ *†	14 (3)	3	0	0	2	2	16 (3)	5	5	1
5	DF	ENG	Tom Thorpe *	6	0	0	0	0	0	6	0	0	0
~~6~~	DF	ENG	~~Dan Burn~~ *†	23 (1)	0	0	0	4	1	27 (1)	1	3	0
6	DF	ENG	Aaron Martin	6 (2)	0	0	0	0	0	6 (2)	0	0	0
7	MF	SCO	Chris Burke	37 (7)	4	2	2	3	0	42 (7)	6	1	0
8	MF	ENG	Jordon Ibe *	4 (7)	1	0	0	0	0	4 (7)	1	1	0
~~9~~	MF	ENG	~~Jesse Lingard~~ *†	13	6	0	0	0	0	13	6	0	1
9	FW	ITA	Federico Macheda *	10 (8)	10	0	0	0	0	10 (8)	10	2	0
10 (Note: Ambrose began the season with squad number 10, but after he was loaned out for the remainder of the season the number was allocated to Howard.)	MF	ENG	Darren Ambrose	1	0	0	0	0 (1)	0	1 (1)	0	1	0
10	MF	ENG	Brian Howard	4 (1)	1	0	0	0	0	4 (1)	1	1	0
11	FW	DNK	Peter Løvenkrands	3 (12)	1	0 (1)	0	0 (1)	2	3 (14)	3	0	0
12	FW	ENG	Lee Novak	33 (5)	9	2	1	3	1	38 (5)	11	3	0
13	GK	IRE	Colin Doyle	0	0	2	0	4	0	6	0	1	0
14	DF	USA	Will Packwood	12	0	1	0	0	0	13	0	0	0
15	MF	ENG	Wade Elliott	11 (4)	0	0 (1)	0	1 (1)	0	12 (6)	0	1	1
16	MF	GHA	Koby Arthur	0 (1)	0	0	0	1	0	1 (1)	0	1	0
17	MF	IRE	Callum Reilly	21 (4)	0	0	0	3	0	24 (4)	0	5	0
18	DF	ENG	Mitch Hancox	11 (3)	0	2	0	2	0	15 (3)	0	3	0
19	FW	SRB	Nikola Žigić	22 (11)	7	1	0	1	0	26 (11)	7	7	0
20	MF	ENG	Olly Lee	14 (2)	1	2	0	0 (2)	1	16 (4)	2	5	0
22	MF	SCO	Andrew Shinnie	19 (7)	2	0	0	1 (1)	1	20 (8)	3	1	0
23	DF	USA	Jonathan Spector	22	0	0	0	2	0	24	0	6	0
24	MF	ENG	Tom Adeyemi	32 (3)	1	0 (1)	0	4	2	38 (4)	3	4	0
25	FW	ENG	Matt Green	7 (3)	1	0	0	2	1	9 (3)	2	1	0
26	MF	SCO	Scott Allan *	2 (3)	0	0	0	1 (1)	2	3 (4)	2	0	0
27	DF	NIR	Shane Ferguson *	10 (8)	0	2	0	3	0	15 (8)	0	3	0
29	MF	ENG	Reece Brown	3 (3)	0	2	0	0	0	5 (3)	0	0	0
30	GK	ENG	Nick Townsend	0	0	0	0	0	0	0	0	0	0
31	DF	SCO	Paul Caddis	35 (3)	5	2	0	2	0	39 (3)	5	5	0
32	DF	ENG	Amari'i Bell	1	0	0	0	0	0	1	0	0	0
33	MF	ENG	Demarai Gray	1 (6)	1	0 (1)	0	0 (1)	0	1 (8)	1	0	0
~~34~~	MF	POL	~~Dariusz Dudka~~†	1 (1)	0	0	0	0	0	1 (1)	0	1	0
34	MF	ENG	Charlee Adams	0	0	0 (1)	0	0	0	0 (1)	0	0	0
~~35~~	FW	ENG	~~Aaron McLean~~ *†	2 (5)	0	0	0	0	0	2 (5)	0	0	0
35	MF	SVK	Albert Rusnák *	3	0	1	0	0	0	4	0	1	0
36	MF	WAL	Emyr Huws *	17	2	0	0	0	0	17	2	1	0
37	DF	ENG	Tyler Blackett *	6 (2)	0	0	0	0	0	6 (2)	0	0	0
38 (Note: Mullins began the season with squad number 8, but after he was loaned out for the remainder of the season, that number was allocated to Jordon Ibe. When Mullins was recalled, he was given number 38.)	MF	ENG	Hayden Mullins	7 (1)	0	1	0	0	0	8 (1)	0	1	0

Players not included in matchday squads
No.	Pos.	Nat.	Name
~~9~~	FW	JAM	~~Marlon King~~†
21	FW	NED	Akwasi Asante
28	DF	ENG	Ryan Higgins
