= 2011–12 Birmingham City F.C. season =

Birmingham City
2011–12 season
- Chairman: Vico Hui
- Manager: Chris Hughton
- Stadium: St Andrew's
- Championship: 4th
- Play-offs: Semi-finals
- FA Cup: Fifth round
- League Cup: Third round
- UEFA Europa League: Group stage
- Top goalscorer: League: Marlon King (16); All: Marlon King (18)
- Highest home attendance: 28,483 vs. Blackpool, play-off semi-final 2nd leg, 9 May 2012
- Lowest home attendance: 14,494 vs. Wolverhampton Wanderers, FA Cup 3rd round, 7 January 2012
- Average home league attendance: 19,126
| Home colours | Away colours | Third colours |

The 2011–12 season was Birmingham City's 109th season in the English football league system. It ran from 1 July 2011 to 30 June 2012.

After relegation in 18th place from the Premier League in the top flight in the previous season under previous manager Alex McLeish, the team finished in 4th in the Championship under manager Chris Hughton, who was appointed in June after McLeish left for local rivals Aston Villa. They lost on aggregate to 5th place Blackpool in the play-off semi-final, 3–2 on aggregate. Having won the 2011 League Cup, they qualified for the Europa League, in which they reached the group stage and finished 3rd in their group, only one point behind the two teams qualifying for the knockout rounds. In the League Cup, as defending champions, they were eliminated in the third round by Manchester City, unable to defend their title, and they lost to eventual winners Chelsea in the fifth round of the FA Cup after a replay.

Twenty-nine players made at least one appearance in first-team competition, and there were thirteen different goalscorers. Chris Burke, who received Birmingham's Player of the Season and Players' Player of the Season awards, played in 61 of the 62 matches over the season, scored 14 goals and made 19 assists. Marlon King was leading scorer with 18 goals, of which 16 came in league games; he also made 12 assists. Nathan Redmond was the club's young player of the year. Curtis Davies was named in the PFA Championship Team of the Year.

== Background and pre-season ==
After leading the club to victory in the League Cup and relegation from the Premier League in 2010–11, Alex McLeish unexpectedly resigned on 12 June, having already made two signings and with another two players close to an agreement with the club. He was immediately linked with the managerial vacancy at Aston Villa. Acting chairman Peter Pannu threatened to report Villa to the League for making an illegal approach to McLeish, and insisted that they could speak to him only if they agreed to pay the £5.4 million compensation due under the terms of his contract. On 17 June, McLeish was appointed manager of Aston Villa. The matter was finally settled on 11 July, when the clubs issued a joint statement confirming that Villa would pay an undisclosed amount in compensation, all proposed legal action would cease, and coach Peter Grant and medical officer Dr Ian McGuinness would be free to follow McLeish to his new club. Chris Hughton, who had led Newcastle United to the Championship title in 2010, was appointed manager on 21 June. He confirmed that promotion back to the Premier League, rather than progress in the Europa League, was his main objective for the season, and brought Paul Trollope in to replace Andy Watson as first-team coach.

On 29 June, club president Carson Yeung was arrested in Hong Kong on charges of money laundering, relating to a period before his involvement with the club. He was bailed to re-appear in August, his assets were frozen, and the Hong Kong Stock Exchange suspended trading of shares in the club's holding company, Birmingham International Holdings (BIHL), in which Yeung was the single largest shareholder with around 26%. BIHL appointed acting chairman Peter Pannu and Yeung's 18-year-old son Ryan to the board of the football club, and Michael Wiseman stepped down from the board, ending an 83-year formal association between the club and the Wiseman family. Although it appeared that HSBC, the club's bankers, were unlikely to call in a loan secured on the St Andrew's site, as such a course of action would make it difficult for the club to continue, thus reducing the likelihood of HSBC recovering their money, Yeung's situation impeded the search for new investment. Such a combination of factors, added to the reduced income to be expected following relegation, left the club in financial difficulty and ready to off-load high-earning players, particularly in light of the Football League's adoption of UEFA's financial fair-play regulations relating to clubs not spending in excess of their revenue.

After the shirt sponsorship deal with F&C Investments expired at the end of the 2010–11 season, no long-term sponsor met the value the club set on the brand, so they chose to sell advertising on the shirt on a match-by-match basis. This had the by-product of replica shirts being sold without advertising. However, a one-year shirt sponsorship deal was reached with foreign exchange and money transfer company RationalFX. It emerged that the club had taken legal action against kit manufacturers Xtep for using a derivative version of the club's logo on their own leisurewear, thus infringing intellectual property rights and reducing royalties from sales of officially licensed clothing on the Chinese market.

The players reported back for pre-season training on 4 July ahead of a training camp in Ireland that included a friendly fixture with League of Ireland First Division side Cork City. Without Cameron Jerome and Nikola Žigić, who did not travel due to injury, and Barry Ferguson, who returned to England ahead of his transfer to Blackpool, Hughton used 19 players in a game settled by a 30th-minute goal from new signing Adam Rooney. In the next friendly, at League Two club Hereford United, Hughton made fewer changes but the game finished goalless as his team failed to convert several chances, a pattern continued at Oxford United, also of League Two, where Curtis Davies and Chris Burke both hit the bar as Birmingham lost 2–0. A Birmingham side without Scott Dann, Liam Ridgewell, Jerome, Žigić and Marlon King lost 2–1 to a strong Everton eleven. Everton opened the scoring after an hour through a Leighton Baines free kick, then after Louis Saha was allowed too much time on the edge of the penalty area, his shot bounced awkwardly in front of debutant Boaz Myhill. Rooney pulled one back with a back-heel to turn Morgaro Gomis' shot into the net.

| Date | Opponents | Venue | Result | Score F–A | Scorers | Attendance | Refs |
|---|---|---|---|---|---|---|---|
| 16 July 2011 | Cork City | A | W | 1–0 | Rooney 30' | 1,917 | |
| 23 July 2011 | Hereford United | A | D | 0–0 | | 2,848 | |
| 26 July 2011 | Oxford United | A | L | 0–2 | | 2,744 | |
| 30 July 2011 | Everton | H | L | 1–2 | Rooney 79' | 7,572 | |

== Championship ==
=== August–September ===
Birmingham fielded five new signings, Boaz Myhill, Steven Caldwell, Chris Burke, Morgaro Gomis and Adam Rooney, on the opening-day visit to Derby County. Curtis Davies opened the scoring with a header from Jordon Mutch's 19th-minute corner, but soon afterwards a Ben Davies free kick was headed home by the unmarked Jason Shackell. Just before half time, Steve Davies was allowed time on the ball to set himself and beat Myhill with a swerving shot from 20 yards (18 m). In the second half, Stephen Carr missed a fine chance to equalise when Burke's shot after a fine forward run rebounded into his path. At home to Coventry City, loanee Chris Wood started as a lone striker. Birmingham were fortunate that Lukas Jutkiewicz failed to convert a good chance after turning Caldwell, and Myhill came close to carrying the ball over his line when saving a misplaced cross. After 73 minutes, Rooney, who had replaced Wood five minutes before, headed against the post, was first to the rebound, and turned the ball back into the path of the oncoming Keith Fahey who shot home from ten yards out.

Playing on the Sunday because of their Europa League play-off match on the Thursday, Rooney opened the scoring from the penalty spot after Burke was fouled, but Middlesbrough went on to complete their third consecutive victory by three goals to one. Rooney again opened the scoring the following Sunday, at Watford, with a first-half tap-in after David Murphy headed on Jean Beausejour's corner. Marvin Sordell equalised from distance in the 80th minute, then Beausejour intercepted a pass and fed Chris Wood who finished neatly with two minutes of normal time remaining. However, in stoppage time, Myhill could only parry Sordell's shot up in the air, and former Birmingham defender Martin Taylor was first to the ball as it came down.

Myhill made two early saves against Millwall before Wood's first senior hat-trick, courtesy of Beausejour and Burke crosses and hard work by Rooney, took Birmingham into mid-table. Marlon King made a debut delayed by injury. Southampton beat Birmingham 4–1 at St Mary's to go top of the division, before a first half at home to Barnsley that Chris Hughton called "as poor as we've played since I've been here". Davies suffered a knee injury after nine minutes and Jacob Butterfield scored the first opposition goal of the season at St Andrew's, but the introduction of Nikola Žigić for his first league appearance since April put pressure on the visitors, a late Burke goal from 25 yards (23 m), his first for the club, saved a point, and King nearly stole all three when his stoppage-time shot hit the inside of the post and came out.

=== October–November ===
For the first time, Birmingham won the match after a Europa League fixture. A goal down at Nottingham Forest with 15 minutes left, Burke gathered a loose ball and hit a powerful shot from 25 yards, then set up Wood to score with the help of a deflection. Wood's second came from the Forest defence's failure to compete for a through ball. Manager Steve McClaren resigned after the match. After a change of referee at half-time because of injury, King converted a penalty before Leicester City's captain, Matt Mills, was sent off for a two-footed tackle on Gomis, and Wood brought his league goal tally to eight in nine games. They followed up with another win, away to Bristol City, despite missing several chances: Burke converted Beausejour's cross and beat the offside trap to score a 95th-minute second through David James's legs. Žigić's first goal since the League Cup final secured a 1–0 win at home to Leeds United, a sixth successive win in all competitions that placed Birmingham eighth in the table, one point off the playoff positions with two games in hand. October ended with a goalless "game of few chances" at home to Brighton & Hove Albion.

In sharp contrast, November began with a game of many chances, with both goalkeepers "in sensational form", in which Reading's Noel Hunt scored the only goal with his first touch. After Grant McCann's "spectacular" free kick earned Peterborough United a 1–1 draw at St Andrew's, a disappointed King stressed the need "to be more clinical in the final third all around the team". Beausejour followed up a Lee Grant save to give Birmingham an early lead against Burnley, but again it looked as though the forwards' profligacy would prove costly. King produced what the Independent proposed as a candidate for miss of the season, and Marvin Bartley equalised after a corner was cleared straight to his feet, but in the first minute of stoppage time, Redmond and Murphy combined down the wing and Burke converted Murphy's cross from close range. Second-half substitute Žigić headed wide "from point-blank range" in the 85th minute at Blackpool, then equalised from Jonathan Spector's cross two minutes later.

=== December–January ===
A string of Birmingham errors helped Cardiff City to third place in the table. Having missed two headed chances in the first half, just after the interval Žigić chose to pass rather than shoot with only the goalkeeper to beat. Then Davies was sent off for a clumsy tackle on Kenny Miller on the edge of the penalty area. Although Peter Whittingham's free kick hit the post, substitute centre-half Pablo gifted Miller a goal shortly afterwards by heading a cross straight to his feet. Chris Hughton thought that "over 90 minutes we certainly had enough chances not to lose the game" at Hull City, blaming the defeat on failure to take chances and failure to defend well enough. Birmingham came from behind to beat Doncaster Rovers 2–1, with goals created by Burke and scored by King, before losing at Crystal Palace to a late Kagisho Dikgacoi header in a match dominated by the goalkeepers.

West Ham United, watched by joint chairmen David Sullivan and David Gold, former owners of Birmingham City, were the visitors on Boxing Day. They took an early lead when Pablo failed to deal with a ball in from the left, and goalscorer Carlton Cole's shot on the turn in stoppage time was thwarted only by a fine save by Myhill. But Birmingham had the better of the second period, Murphy's glancing header tied the scores, and Robert Green kept out King's close-range header. They went into the new year in 12th place, six points off the playoff positions with two games in hand, and still unbeaten at home in the league, after a comfortable victory against Blackpool, with goals from Davies, King and Redmond. Blackpool captain and former Birmingham midfielder Barry Ferguson was sent off for elbowing Guirane N'Daw.

After a minute's applause in memory of former Birmingham defender Gary Ablett, who died of blood cancer the previous day, Peterborough United took the lead after 29 seconds of the first match of 2012 when Emile Sinclair beat the offside trap. Birmingham had the better of the match, but equalised only in the 94th minute, when the ball took an unkind bounce, striking man-of-the-match Gabriel Zakuani on the hand, and King converted the resultant penalty. Another late goal, this time by Žigić at home to Ipswich Town, gave them a win in the first of their two games in hand. Colin Doyle made his first league appearance of the season when illness prevented Myhill from continuing after half-time. Millwall had the better of the first half at The Den, despite being a goal and a man down, but when a second player was sent off (both for fouls on Žigić), they were unable to cope with the numerical imbalance and Birmingham scored another five. A 3–0 win at home to Watford followed by Žigić's four goals at Leeds United took Birmingham fourth, five points off automatic promotion and still with a game in hand.

=== February–March ===
Guirane N'Daw returned from Africa Cup of Nations duty with Senegal to play second-placed Southampton in freezing conditions and heavy snow. He missed an early headed chance as the game finished goalless. Birmingham's last game in hand was against a Portsmouth team who had not received their wages with the club on the verge of liquidation. An 86th-minute volley by substitute Nathan Redmond gave Birmingham a win that moved them up to third in the table. The visit of Hull City, the only team to have conceded fewer goals than Birmingham, finished predictably goalless. Winger Burke and playmaker Fahey starred in a 3–1 win at Barnsley, but the unbeaten run finally ended on 25 February at home to Nottingham Forest.

Birmingham made three loan signings, Andros Townsend, Erik Huseklepp and Peter Ramage, in the days before the Football League imposed a transfer embargo because the club's accounts had not been submitted by the due date. They went 2–0 up at home to Derby County when Townsend's shot was deflected to Huseklepp and then after Townsend's "dazzling" run set up King, then after "slack defending" allowed Derby to draw level, both N'Daw and Caldwell came close to a winning goal. Mutch was sent off as relegation candidates Coventry City's Gary McSheffrey and Marlon King each scored against their former club, and Spector went off injured as Leicester City beat Birmingham with two late goals. Birmingham returned to winning ways in their 50th match of the season, at home to Middlesbrough. On the same day, Fabrice Muamba, who spent two seasons as a Birmingham player, suffered a cardiac arrest during a televised match. His heart stopped for 78 minutes before it was restarted, and after lengthy hospital treatment he recovered, but retired from football on medical advice.

Žigić's tenth goal of the season gave Birmingham an early lead at Portsmouth, but it did not last. Chris Maguire equalised with a deflected free kick after a foul by Davies on Luke Varney, then Murphy received a second yellow card for a foul on Maguire, and from the resultant free kick, David Norris controlled the ball before turning to score; Birmingham lost their composure and the match, by four goals to one. Hughton said afterwards that he had "not been as angry with any other refereeing performance this season", suggesting that the foul on Varney, for which Davies was booked, was in fact a foul by Varney, as the player himself admitted, that Norris had used his hand to control the ball as he turned to shoot, and that Murphy's second booking, for "minimal" shoulder-to-shoulder contact, was harsh – a view reinforced by the normally undemonstrative Murphy's aggressive reaction to his dismissal. King had a penalty saved in a draw with Cardiff City, and a 3–1 win at Doncaster Rovers in which both King and Žigić struck the woodwork and King was booked for diving when apparently fouled by the goalkeeper, moved Birmingham up to fourth in the table.

=== April ===
Mutch scored his first senior goal just a minute after Burnley's equaliser, and David Murphy made the final score 3–1. The scoreline was repeated at home to Crystal Palace; Birmingham were 3–0 up after 32 minutes, and the result was never in doubt. Mutch's second, a clever solo goal, opened the scoring at West Ham United, and King's 17th of the season gave Birmingham a two-goal lead. Ricardo Vaz Tê pulled one back going into half-time, but Burke restored the two-goal margin even further into stoppage time when his downward volley bounced over everyone. After the interval, West Ham pressed repeatedly but caused few problems until N'Daw, a big, strong, defensive midfielder, went off injured. Within two minutes, Kevin Nolan touched a long ball to Carlton Cole, who drove it low past Myhill, and West Ham equalised through Vaz Tê's 89th-minute penalty awarded for handball when "Lansbury's vicious shot struck the raised arm of Burke, who was in close proximity to the effort."

Myhill injured his thumb while warming up for the match against Bristol City, so Doyle kept goal. The injury kept Myhill out for the rest of the season. Birmingham came back from two goals down but were unable to find a winner. A draw at Ipswich Town was followed by a visit to Brighton & Hove Albion. Gomis' aggressive attitude provoked Hughton into replacing him by Redmond after only half an hour, and it was Redmond who gave Birmingham the lead with a low 30-yard shot. Despite Brighton's late equaliser, the draw confirmed Birmingham's playoff place, barring exceptional results. Birmingham rested King and Burke for the last match of the season, at home to champions Reading. Žigić left the field after 19 minutes with an ankle injury and his replacement, Adam Rooney, gave Birmingham the lead soon afterwards. Pablo's eventful match – after two goalline clearances and hitting the post at the right end – culminated in conceding a penalty, which Doyle saved. Elliott increased the lead from the penalty spot, and then had a second penalty saved. The win placed Birmingham fourth in the table, which gave them home advantage for the second leg of the playoff semi-final against Blackpool.

=== Match details ===
General source (match reports): Any match content not verifiable from that source is referenced individually.

The Championship match details
| Date | League position | Opponents | Venue | Result | Score F–A | Scorers | Attendance | Refs |
|---|---|---|---|---|---|---|---|---|
| 6 August 2011 | 18th | Derby County | A | L | 1–2 | Davies 19' | 27,210 | |
| 13 August 2011 | 12th | Coventry City | H | W | 1–0 | Fahey 73' | 19,225 | |
| 21 August 2011 | 18th | Middlesbrough | A | L | 1–3 | Rooney 36' pen. | 17,567 | |
| 28 August 2011 | 21st | Watford | A | D | 2–2 | Rooney 39', Wood 88' | 11,937 | |
| 11 September 2011 | 12th | Millwall | H | W | 3–0 | Wood (3) 29', 62', 90' | 17,901 | |
| 18 September 2011 | 14th | Southampton | A | L | 1–4 | Wood 49' | 22,155 | |
| 24 September 2011 | 16th | Barnsley | H | D | 1–1 | Burke 86' | 17,836 | |
| 2 October 2011 | 17th | Nottingham Forest | A | W | 3–1 | Burke 75', Wood (2) 79', 88' | 20,556 | |
| 16 October 2011 | 15th | Leicester City | H | W | 2–0 | King 50' pen., Wood 84' | 17,102 | |
| 23 October 2011 | 14th | Bristol City | A | W | 2–0 | Burke (2) 46', 90+5' | 13,577 | |
| 26 October 2011 | 8th | Leeds United | H | W | 1–0 | Žigić 35' | 21,426 | |
| 29 October 2011 | 8th | Brighton & Hove Albion | H | D | 0–0 | | 20,095 | |
| 6 November 2011 | 13th | Reading | A | L | 0–1 | | 18,361 | |
| 19 November 2011 | 12th | Peterborough United | H | D | 1–1 | King 22' | 18,090 | |
| 22 November 2011 | 8th | Burnley | H | W | 2–1 | Beausejour 2', Burke 90+1' | 16,253 | |
| 26 November 2011 | 8th | Blackpool | A | D | 2–2 | King 29', Žigić 87' | 13,436 | |
| 4 December 2011 | 14th | Cardiff City | A | L | 0–1 | | 22,010 | |
| 7 December 2011 | 14th | Hull City | A | L | 1–2 | Wood 34' | 17,438 | |
| 10 December 2011 | 13th | Doncaster Rovers | H | W | 2–1 | King (2) 62, 88' | 17,369 | |
| 19 December 2011 | 14th | Crystal Palace | A | L | 0–1 | | 12,057 | |
| 26 December 2011 | 15th | West Ham United | H | D | 1–1 | Murphy 81' | 20,214 | |
| 31 December 2011 | 12th | Blackpool | H | W | 3–0 | Davies 45+1', King 52', Redmond 89' | 19,995 | |
| 2 January 2012 | 14th | Peterborough United | A | D | 1–1 | King 90+4' pen. | 11,167 | |
| 11 January 2012 | 9th | Ipswich Town | H | W | 2–1 | Žigić (2) 9', 90+1' | 16,528 | |
| 14 January 2012 | 7th | Millwall | A | W | 6–0 | Davies 18', King (2) 59', 83', Burke 74', Rooney 81', Redmond 90+2' | 10,539 | |
| 21 January 2012 | 6th | Watford | H | W | 3–0 | Davies (2) 35', 60', Burke 81' | 18,681 | |
| 31 January 2012 | 4th | Leeds United | A | W | 4–1 | Žigić (4) 31', 61', 64', 68' | 19,628 | |
| 4 February 2012 | 5th | Southampton | H | D | 0–0 | | 17,904 | |
| 7 February 2012 | 3rd | Portsmouth | H | W | 1–0 | Redmond 86' | 16,930 | |
| 14 February 2012 | 5th | Hull City | H | D | 0–0 | | 18,900 | |
| 21 February 2012 | 3rd | Barnsley | A | W | 3–1 | Edwards 8' o.g., Fahey 27', Redmond 78' | 9,558 | |
| 25 February 2012 | 5th | Nottingham Forest | H | L | 1–2 | Burke 55' | 19,166 | |
| 3 March 2012 | 6th | Derby County | H | D | 2–2 | Huseklepp 19', King 57' | 17,996 | |
| 10 March 2012 | 7th | Coventry City | A | D | 1–1 | King 72' | 22,240 | |
| 13 March 2012 | 8th | Leicester City | A | L | 1–3 | Elliott 20' pen. | 21,092 | |
| 17 March 2012 | 4th | Middlesbrough | H | W | 3–0 | Žigić 11', King 57', Fahey 60' | 19,927 | |
| 20 March 2012 | 6th | Portsmouth | A | L | 1–4 | Žigić 7' | 12,186 | |
| 25 March 2012 | 6th | Cardiff City | H | D | 1–1 | Huseklepp 68' | 17,704 | |
| 30 March 2012 | 4th | Doncaster Rovers | A | W | 3–1 | Murphy 15', Burke 61', King 80' | 8,656 | |
| 3 April 2012 | 4th | Burnley | A | W | 3–1 | King 11', Mutch 75', Murphy 88' | 13,221 | |
| 7 April 2012 | 4th | Crystal Palace | H | W | 3–1 | Burke 21', Fahey 22', Murphy 32' | 21,932 | |
| 9 April 2012 | 4th | West Ham United | A | D | 3–3 | Mutch 27', King 30', Burke 45+4' | 31,045 | |
| 14 April 2012 | 4th | Bristol City | H | D | 2–2 | King 44', Žigić 61' | 23,230 | |
| 17 April 2012 | 4th | Ipswich Town | A | D | 1–1 | Burke 45+1' | 16,503 | |
| 21 April 2012 | 5th | Brighton & Hove Albion | A | D | 1–1 | Redmond 69' | 20,594 | |
| 28 April 2012 | 4th | Reading | H | W | 2–0 | Rooney 24', Elliott 75' pen. | 25,516 | |

=== League table ===
| Pos | Team | Pld | W | D | L | GF | GA | GD | Pts | Promotion or relegation |
|---|---|---|---|---|---|---|---|---|---|---|
| 2 | Southampton (P) | 46 | 26 | 10 | 10 | 85 | 46 | +39 | 88 | Promotion to the Premier League |
| 3 | West Ham United (O, P) | 46 | 24 | 14 | 8 | 81 | 48 | +33 | 86 | Qualification for Championship play-offs |
| 4 | Birmingham City | 46 | 20 | 16 | 10 | 78 | 51 | +27 | 76 | Qualification for Championship play-offs |
| 5 | Blackpool | 46 | 20 | 15 | 11 | 79 | 59 | +20 | 75 | Qualification for Championship play-offs |
| 6 | Cardiff City | 46 | 19 | 18 | 9 | 66 | 53 | +13 | 75 | Qualification for Championship play-offs |

Updated to match(es) played on 28 April 2012. Source:
Rules for classification: 1) points; 2) goal difference; 3) number of goals scored.
(O) Play-off winners; (P) Promoted

=== Results summary ===
| Overall | | | | | | | | Home | | | | | | Away | | | | | |
| Pld | W | D | L | GF | GA | GD | Pts | W | D | L | GF | GA | GD | W | D | L | GF | GA | GD |
|---|---|---|---|---|---|---|---|---|---|---|---|---|---|---|---|---|---|---|---|
| 46 | 20 | 16 | 10 | 78 | 51 | +27 | 76 | 13 | 9 | 1 | 37 | 14 | +23 | 7 | 7 | 9 | 41 | 37 | +4 |

Last updated: match played 28 April 2012.

=== Play-offs ===
Birmingham played fifth-placed Blackpool in the play-off semi-final. The match was played over two legs, the first leg being played at the ground of the lower-placed team. Birmingham lost the first leg 1–0, to a Tom Ince shot deflected past Colin Doyle by Curtis Davies. In the second leg, in front of a 28,483 sell-out crowd, Blackpool scored either side of half time to take a 3–0 aggregate lead before Birmingham staged a fightback, with goals from Nikola Žigić and Davies, but were unable to score the necessary third goal to take the tie into extra time.

Play-off match details
| Round | Date | Opponents | Venue | Result | Score F–A | Scorers | Attendance |
|---|---|---|---|---|---|---|---|
| Semi-final first leg | 4 May 2012 | Blackpool | A | L | 0–1 | | 13,832 |
| Semi-final second leg | 9 May 2012 | Blackpool | H | D | 2–2; 2–3 agg. | Žigić 64', Davies 73' | 28,483 |

== UEFA Europa League ==
The League Cup winners would normally enter the UEFA Europa League at the third qualifying round. However, because Manchester City both won the 2011 FA Cup and qualified for the Champions League via their Premier League finishing position, Birmingham entered the competition at the play-off round, one round before the group stages. They were drawn to play Nacional, who qualified as sixth-placed team in the Portuguese Primeira Liga and had beaten FH of Iceland and Swedish club Häcken to reach the play-off round.

Weakened by injuries for the away leg in Madeira, Birmingham gave David Murphy and Nathan Redmond their first appearances of the season, defender Liam Ridgewell played in central midfield alongside winger Jean Beausejour and debutant Jonathan Spector, and 19-year-old Chris Wood played as a lone striker. Captain Stephen Carr was making his 100th Birmingham appearance. Early in the game, Curtis Davies made a well-timed tackle from behind to prevent Mateus opening the scoring. Midway through the half, Steven Caldwell's placed header from a corner struck the foot of the post. Just before half time, a loose ball fell to Wood on the edge of the penalty area and his powerful shot rebounded down off the crossbar and back into play. Just after the interval, a driven shot from outside the area from the 17-year-old Redmond, playing his first 90 minutes at senior level, was pushed aside by goalkeeper Elisson Aparecido Rosa and returned to Wood who headed against the post. The game finished goalless. For the home leg, Birmingham had to widen the pitch from its usual 66 metres (72 yd) to 68 m (74 yd) to comply with UEFA regulations. After an uncertain start, Birmingham took the lead when Murphy fed Redmond who scored with a low drive from 20 yards (18 m). Nine minutes later, Murphy's header from a Beausejour corner appeared to come off both Luis Alberto and the crossbar before crossing the line. After numerous chances to increase the lead, including a curled shot from Redmond that hit the inside of the post, Wood's 84th-minute tap-in secured a 3–0 win and qualification for the group stage. With a couple of minutes left, Birmingham gave a debut to 18-year-old striker Akwasi Asante and a first appearance of the season for fellow teenager Jake Jervis.

Birmingham were drawn in Group H, alongside last season's finalists Braga of Portugal, Slovenian champions Maribor, who beat Rangers of Scotland in the play-off round after losing in the third qualifying round of the Champions League, and fourth-placed Belgian team Club Brugge, who overcame Qarabağ of Azerbaijan and Georgian champions Zestaponi to reach the group stage. Matchday one produced a defeat at home to Braga. Hélder Barbosa opened the scoring after just six minutes with a volley from a Nuno Gomes cross which Boaz Myhill could only palm into the net, then Lima doubled the deficit against the run of play. Hughton introduced Chris Burke and Chris Wood, and Burke's pass led to Marlon King's 71st-minute goal. Birmingham were caught on the break while going for the equaliser, Barbosa making the final score 3–1 to the visitors.

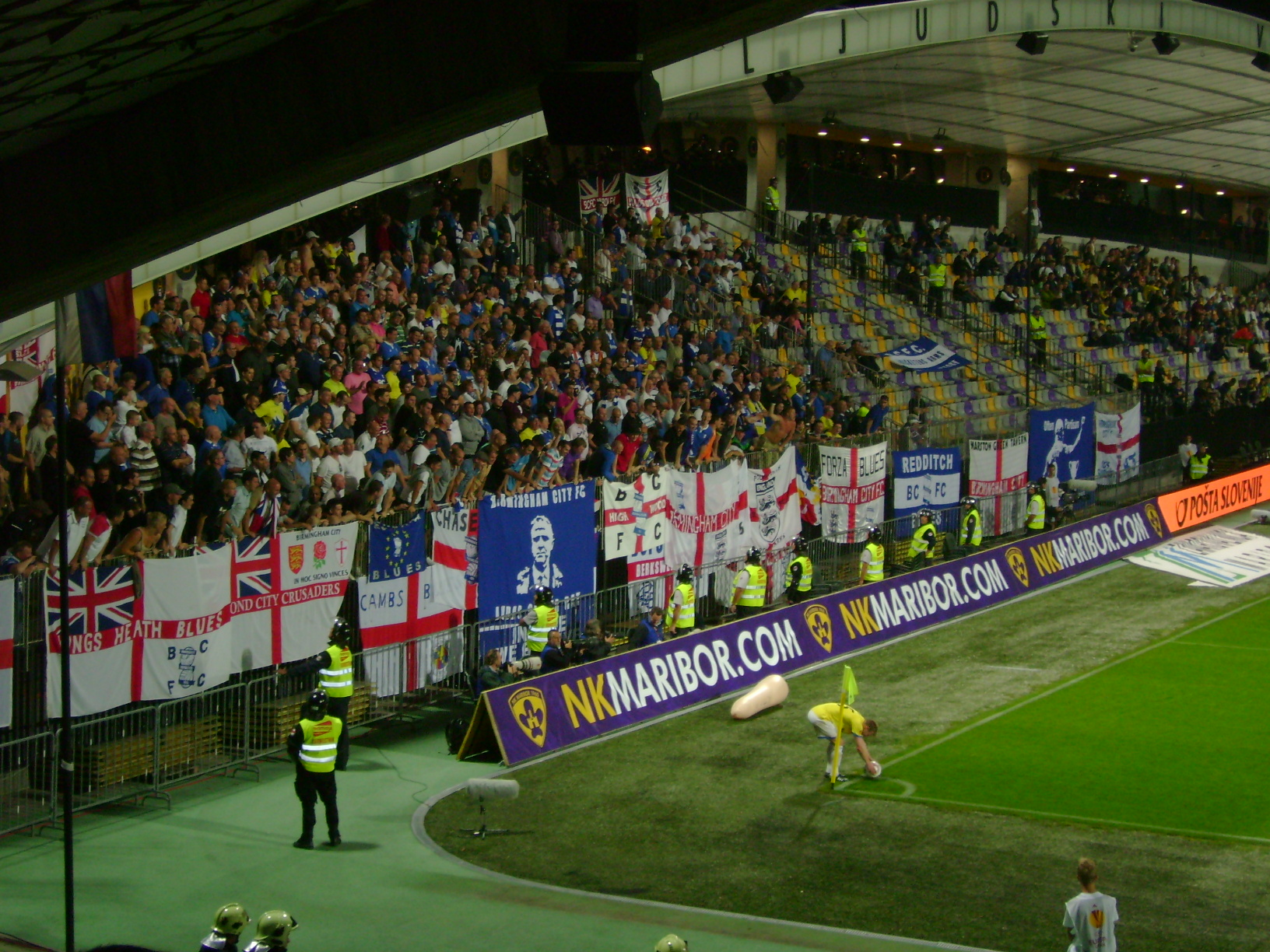
Visiting Birmingham fans during the club's first away appearance in group stage of the UEFA Europa League in 2011

In the absence through injury of Carr for the visit to Maribor, Ridgewell assumed the captaincy. Early in the game, Maribor had several shots off target, but they took a 29th-minute lead when Spector looped a casual back-pass which Colin Doyle missed entirely when attempting to clear. Dalibor Volaš picked up the loose ball and tapped into an empty net. The manner of the goal had a dampening effect on both players and fans. In the second half, Nikola Žigić and Wood were ready to come on as substitutes when King used his strength to hold up a ball in midfield and played it through to Burke, who rounded Martin Milec and shot low past Jasmin Handanović. Only Žigić came on, to replace King. Both he and Wade Elliott missed chances, Žigić heading over the bar from close range and Elliott shooting straight at the goalkeeper when clean through. In the 79th minute, a long clearance was controlled by Morgaro Gomis who touched the ball to Elliott, possibly via a defender's arm. Elliott scored what proved the winning goal, hitting a clean volley from outside the area, which Handanovič partly blocked, but was unable to stop creeping underneath him.

Despite pre-match scare stories suggesting 5,600 hooligans were about to descend on the "Venice of the north", Birmingham's visit passed off with only eight administrative arrests, and the Bruges police used their Twitter account to thank the visiting fans for their "friendly conduct". On the field, the defence made a shaky start as Brugge took an early lead through Joseph Akpala. After 25 minutes, David Murphy ran into the penalty area apparently unnoticed to finish Elliott's cross. Rooney failed to convert Žigić's knockdown and Žigić put a free header wide before Hughton brought on King and Wood in their place. Near the end of normal time, a clash of heads with Akpala left Pablo Ibáñez unconscious for some minutes before he was carried off on a spinal board, leaving teammate Guirane N'Daw in tears. In the tenth minute of stoppage time, King crossed from the right and Wood shot into the roof of the net from six yards out, to make Birmingham the first English team to defeat Brugge in their own stadium, and put them top of Group H.

After three more defeats from winning positions, culminating in a 5–4 loss to Genk when 4–2 ahead with 20 minutes left, Brugge dismissed manager Adrie Koster. For Birmingham, Pablo made his first appearance since suffering concussion. The visitors took the lead with five minutes remaining in the first half. From a Víctor Vázquez corner, Thomas Meunier had time to take a touch before shooting past the player on the post from eight yards out. Soon afterwards, Beausejour lost the ball in midfield and Vadis Odjidja crossed to Akpala who scored from an arguably offside position. Žigić's 55th-minute blocked shot rebounded to Beausejour who controlled well and lashed it back past the goalkeeper to reduce the deficit. After 66 minutes, Birmingham made a triple substitution, bringing on Burke, King and Wood for Elliott, Rooney and Žigić. The equaliser came eight minutes later; Ryan Donk fouled Beausejour just inside the area and Marlon King converted the penalty. The ball struck the woodwork three times: midway through the first half from Murphy's free kick on the edge of the area; just after the third goal, from Odjidja's curling 25-yard (23 m) shot; and just before the equalising goal, Vladan Kujović, given his debut in place of Colin Coosemans, "sensationally tipping Guirane N'daw's thunderous volley against an upright".

In front of a small crowd, a strong Birmingham side, with Žigić as lone striker, attacked Braga from the start. An early handball appeal was turned down, but after ten minutes, Ewerton pulled down Elliott as he cut into the penalty area. Žigić took the penalty, but Quim had no difficulty saving. Soon afterwards, Ewerton fouled Burke on the edge of the area, but the referee failed to award what would have been a second yellow card. Early in the second half, Hugo Viana's shot from distance was going wide of Myhill's right-hand post but took a huge deflection off Curtis Davies to leave Myhill stranded and the ball in the other corner of his net. Birmingham brought on King and Wood, but to no avail. Both teams had chances near the end: Burke and King obstructed each other, and when Lima was clean through, Myhill parried his shot straight to Paulo César who hit the ball over the top. The result saw Braga qualify, and combined with Brugge's win in Maribor, who came back from 3–0 down to score four times in the last quarter-hour, left Birmingham needing to beat Maribor in the last group game and hope that Braga beat Brugge.

One of nine changes to the starting eleven, Redmond produced an outstanding performance as Birmingham outclassed Maribor in the last group stage fixture. Apart from Jovan Vidović's early header that went wide, the attacking play was all Birmingham's. After 24 minutes, Rooney scored his first European goal, a close-range header from a Redmond cross, then Žigić failed to take a couple of chances, Davies failed to make contact with a Redmond corner when it would have been easier to score, and Redmond himself hit a half-volley against the post from distance. His marker, Arghus, was perhaps fortunate to escape a red card for a high tackle born of frustration. But ten-man Braga could only draw with Brugge, so Birmingham's ten points were not enough.

Europa League match details
| Round | Date | Opponents | Venue | Result | Score F–A | Scorers | Attendance | Refs |
|---|---|---|---|---|---|---|---|---|
| Play-off round first leg | 18 August 2011 | Nacional | A | D | 0–0 | | 4,323 | |
| Play-off round second leg | 25 August 2011 | Nacional | H | W | 3–0 | Redmond 15', Murphy 24', Wood 86' | 27,698 | |
| Group stage | 15 September 2011 | Braga | H | L | 1–3 | King 71' | 21,747 | |
| Group stage | 29 September 2011 | Maribor | A | W | 2–1 | Burke 64', Elliott 79' | 11,000 | |
| Group stage | 20 October 2011 | Club Brugge | A | W | 2–1 | Murphy 26', Wood 90+10' | 23,936 | |
| Group stage | 3 November 2011 | Club Brugge | H | D | 2–2 | Beausejour 55', King 74' pen. | 26,849 | |
| Group stage | 30 November 2011 | Braga | A | L | 0–1 | | 9,957 | |
| Group stage | 15 December 2011 | Maribor | H | W | 1–0 | Rooney 24' | 21,436 | |

Group H final table
| Pos | Club | Nation | Pld | W | D | L | F | A | GD | Pts |
|---|---|---|---|---|---|---|---|---|---|---|
| 1 | Club Brugge | Belgium | 6 | 3 | 2 | 1 | 12 | 9 | +3 | 11 |
| 2 | Braga | Portugal | 6 | 3 | 2 | 1 | 12 | 6 | +6 | 11 |
| 3 | Birmingham City | England | 6 | 3 | 1 | 2 | 8 | 8 | 0 | 10 |
| 4 | Maribor | Slovenia | 6 | 0 | 1 | 5 | 6 | 15 | −9 | 1 |
| Key | Pos=League position; Pld=Matches played; W=Matches won; D=Matches drawn; L=Matches lost; F=Goals for; A=Goals against; GD=Goal difference; Pts=Points | | | | | | | | | |
| Source | | | | | | | | | | |

Note that for tie-breaking purposes, points, goal difference, goals scored and away goals scored in matches between clubs level on total points count before the same criteria in all group matches.

== League Cup ==
Together with the other clubs playing in European competition, Birmingham entered the League Cup in the third round, in which they were drawn away to Premier League club Manchester City. With top scorer Chris Wood ineligible and Wade Elliott cup-tied, Keith Fahey returned to the starting eleven after injury, Myhill, Caldwell and King were rested, Carr and Ridgewell injured, and Colin Doyle made his first appearance of the season. The match attracted attention for the return of England international Owen Hargreaves after just six minutes of first-team football in the previous three years. Hargreaves and Mario Balotelli scored first-half goals as City won 2–0. Curtis Davies's overhead kick was cleared off the line by Kolo Touré, making his return to the City side after a six-month drugs ban, and Nikola Žigić came on as substitute for his first Birmingham appearance in nearly six months.

League Cup match details
| Round | Date | Opponents | Venue | Result | Score F–A | Scorers | Attendance | Refs |
|---|---|---|---|---|---|---|---|---|
| Third round | 21 September 2011 | Manchester City | A | L | 0–2 | | 25,070 | |

== FA Cup ==
Birmingham City, like all clubs in the top two divisions, entered the FA Cup in the third round (last 64), in which they were drawn to face Wolverhampton Wanderers of the Premier League at home. A dull goalless draw was enlivened only by the booing of Roger Johnson and Doyle's double save, from Matt Jarvis and then Steven Fletcher, late in stoppage time. Neither team fielded a full first team in the replay; as in the original match, Birmingham selected Rooney as a lone striker in front of a five-man midfield including youngster Redmond. In the first half, Murphy and Beausejour had to leave the field for treatment after a clash of heads, and both sides had scoring chances, before Elliott's close-range shot against the post rebounded to Murphy, who prodded the ball forward for Elliott, still lying on the floor, to score in the 74th minute. Again, Doyle made a late double save, this time from Fletcher and Stephen Hunt, to ensure Birmingham would face Sheffield United of League One at Bramall Lane in the next round. Goals from Redmond, Rooney (2) and Elliott gave Birmingham a comfortable victory, attributed by Sheffield United manager Danny Wilson to their "better clinical finishes", and youngsters Eddy Gnahoré and Callum Reilly were given debuts with ten minutes remaining.

Away to Chelsea in the fifth round, despite starting without King, Žigić and N'Daw and losing Carr to injury after only 12 minutes, Birmingham opened the scoring when the defence failed to deal with Mutch's corner and Murphy shot firmly home. Two minutes later, Elliott tripped Ramires to concede a penalty, taken by Juan Mata and tipped onto the post by Doyle. In the second half, Chelsea equalised with a Daniel Sturridge header, and Redmond failed to convert a late chance to secure an unlikely victory. Under interim manager Roberto Di Matteo, after André Villas-Boas' dismissal, Chelsea won the replay, but they were made to fight by a weakened Birmingham side motivated by Žigić, who was angered by a facial gash courtesy of David Luiz's boot. Mata scored a scrambled goal soon after half-time, and Raul Meireles doubled the lead with a rising shot from 20 yards (18 m), but Doyle again saved a penalty from Mata to restrict the winning margin to two goals.

FA Cup match details
| Round | Date | Opponents | Venue | Result | Score F–A | Scorers | Attendance | Refs |
|---|---|---|---|---|---|---|---|---|
| Third round | 7 January 2012 | Wolverhampton Wanderers | H | D | 0–0 | | 14,594 | |
| Third round replay | 18 January 2012 | Wolverhampton Wanderers | A | W | 1–0 | Elliott 74' | 10,153 | |
| Fourth round | 28 January 2012 | Sheffield United | A | W | 4–0 | Redmond 18', Rooney (2) 38', 78', Elliott 58' | 18,072 | |
| Fifth round | 16 February 2012 | Chelsea | A | D | 1–1 | Murphy 20' | 36,870 | |
| Fifth round replay | 6 March 2012 | Chelsea | H | L | 0–2 | | 21,822 | |

== Transfers ==
At the end of the 2010–11 season, Birmingham released first-team players Sebastian Larsson, Kevin Phillips, Martin Jiránek, Lee Bowyer, Maik Taylor and Stuart Parnaby, and fringe players Marcus Bent, Jay O'Shea, Dan Preston and Robin Shroot. All the loanees returned to their owning clubs. The club attempted to agree a new contract with James McFadden but failed to do so before his existing deal expired. Teenage midfielders Luke Hubbins and Ashley Sammons were given contract extensions, and Belgian midfielder Brice Ntambwe and American defender/midfielder Will Packwood, both internationals at under-17 level, signed their first professional contracts.

In early June, the club agreed the signings of Cardiff City winger Chris Burke, Coventry City striker Marlon King (who was accused by his former club of having reneged on a verbal agreement to remain with them), Dundee United midfielder Morgaro Gomis, and PSV forward Danny Koevermans, all of whom were out of contract and thus available as free agents under the Bosman ruling. When McLeish resigned on 12 June, Burke and King had already signed pre-contract agreements, but the moves for Gomis and Koevermans had not reached that stage. The Gomis deal was completed, but Koevermans pulled out, reluctant to join a club whose future manager might not want him. Hughton's first signing was Inverness Caledonian Thistle striker Adam Rooney, also a free transfer under the Bosman ruling, soon followed by Scotland international defender Steven Caldwell, recently released by Wigan Athletic. United States international defender Jonathan Spector, who was released by West Ham United after their relegation, joined four days before the league season opened, and West Bromwich Albion's New Zealand international striker Chris Wood arrived three days later on a month's loan, later extended for a further month.

The first departure of the summer transfer window was 2010–11 top scorer Craig Gardner, who joined Sunderland for an undisclosed fee, believed by BBC Sport to be "about £6 million". Roger Johnson, who had made it clear to the club that he wanted to remain in the Premier League, was next, joining Wolverhampton Wanderers for an undisclosed fee, initially reported as £7m but later suggested by the Express & Star to be "just over £4m", then Barry Ferguson, who wanted to move closer to his family in Scotland, signed for Blackpool for an undisclosed fee in the region of £700,000. Next to leave was player of the year Ben Foster, who joined West Bromwich Albion on loan for the season, while Albion goalkeeper Boaz Myhill moved in the other direction, also on loan. It was reported that Albion were to pay the wages of both players.

After the playing season started, midfielder Míchel returned to Spain to join Getafe for an undisclosed fee. Senegal international defensive midfielder Guirane N'Daw signed on loan from Saint-Étienne until January 2012. On the last day of the transfer window, Scott Dann and Cameron Jerome returned to the Premier League for undisclosed fees, Jerome signing for Stoke City for a fee believed by Sky Sports to be £4m, and Dann joining Blackburn Rovers. Birmingham signed 18-year-old Jack Deaman, a centre-back formerly of Wrexham, and the experienced Burnley winger Wade Elliott and former Spanish international centre-back Pablo Ibáñez from West Bromwich Albion, each for an undisclosed fee.

During the January 2012 transfer window, Jean Beausejour returned to the Premier League with Wigan Athletic for an undisclosed fee, and Liam Ridgewell, whose transfer request in August had been turned down, joined West Bromwich Albion, again for an undisclosed fee. In February, with Portsmouth in administration, their Norwegian international forward Erik Huseklepp joined on loan until the end of the season, as did England youth international winger Andros Townsend, from Tottenham Hotspur, and right-sided defender Peter Ramage, from Queens Park Rangers. In addition, two free agents signed short-term contracts: former Ireland international forward Caleb Folan, who had been playing in America for Colorado Rapids, and the manager's son, right-back Cian Hughton, who had trained with the club for several months and was expected to spend his time primarily with the development squad. The day after the last of these signings, the Football League imposed a transfer embargo on the club for failure to submit its accounts by the 1 March deadline.

=== In ===
| Date | Player | Club† | Fee | Refs |
|---|---|---|---|---|
| 1 July 2011 | Chris Burke | (Cardiff City) | Free | |
| 1 July 2011 | Marlon King | (Coventry City) | Free | |
| 1 July 2011 | Morgaro Gomis | (Dundee United) | Free | |
| 1 July 2011 | Adam Rooney | (Inverness Caledonian Thistle) | Free | |
| 7 July 2011 | Steven Caldwell | (Wigan Athletic) | Free | |
| 2 August 2011 | Jonathan Spector | (West Ham United) | Free | |
| 31 August 2011 | Jack Deaman | (Wrexham) | Free | |
| 31 August 2011 | Wade Elliott | Burnley | Undisclosed | |
| 31 August 2011 | Pablo Ibáñez | West Bromwich Albion | Undisclosed | |
| 29 February 2012 | Cian Hughton | (Lincoln City) | Free | |
| 29 February 2012 | Caleb Folan | (Colorado Rapids) | Free | |

† Brackets round club names indicate the player's contract with that club had expired before he joined Birmingham.

=== Out ===
| Date | Player | Fee | Joined | Refs |
|---|---|---|---|---|
| 30 June 2011 | Craig Gardner | Undisclosed | Sunderland | |
| 13 July 2011 | Roger Johnson | Undisclosed | Wolverhampton Wanderers | |
| 22 July 2011 | Barry Ferguson | Undisclosed | Blackpool | |
| 8 August 2011 | Míchel | Undisclosed | Getafe | |
| 31 August 2011 | Scott Dann | Undisclosed | Blackburn Rovers | |
| 31 August 2011 | Cameron Jerome | Undisclosed | Stoke City | |
| 25 January 2012 | Jean Beausejour | Undisclosed | Wigan Athletic | |
| 31 January 2012 | Liam Ridgewell | Undisclosed | West Bromwich Albion | |
| 18 May 2012 | Luke Hubbins | Released | AFC Telford United | |
| 30 June 2012 | Caleb Folan | Released | (T-Team) | |
| 30 June 2012 | Cian Hughton | Released | | |
| 30 June 2012 | Ashley Sammons | Released | (Hereford United) | |
| 30 June 2012 | Enric Vallès | Released | (UE Olot) | |

=== Loan in ===
| Date | Player | Club | Return | Refs |
|---|---|---|---|---|
| 29 July 2011 | Boaz Myhill | West Bromwich Albion | End of season | |
| 5 August 2011 | Chris Wood | West Bromwich Albion | 5 January 2012 | |
| 24 August 2011 | Guirane N'Daw | Saint-Étienne | End of season | |
| 23 February 2012 | Erik Huseklepp | Portsmouth | End of season | |
| 24 February 2012 | Andros Townsend | Tottenham Hotspur | End of season | |
| 29 February 2012 | Peter Ramage | Queens Park Rangers | End of season | |

=== Loan out ===
| Date | Player | Club | Return | Refs |
|---|---|---|---|---|
| 29 July 2011 | Ben Foster | West Bromwich Albion | End of season | |
| 8 September 2011 | Jack Butland | Cheltenham Town | 11 December 2011 | |
| 29 September 2011 | Jake Jervis | Swindon Town | 30 December 2011 | |
| 1 January 2012 | Akwasi Asante | Northampton Town | 28 January 2012 | |
| 1 January 2012 | Jake Jervis | Preston North End | 28 January 2012 | |
| 24 January 2012 | Luke Hubbins | Tamworth | 19 February 2012 | |
| 21 February 2012 | Jack Butland | Cheltenham Town | 16 April 2012 | |

== Appearances and goals ==
Numbers in parentheses denote appearances as substitute.
Players with squad numbers struck through and marked † left the club after the start of the playing season.
Players with names in italics and marked * were on loan for the whole of their 2011–12 season with Birmingham.
Players listed with no appearances have been in the matchday squad but only as unused substitutes.

| No. | Pos. | Nat. | Name | League | | Play-offs | | FA Cup | | League Cup | | Europa League | | Total | | Discipline | |
| No. | Pos. | Nat. | Name | Apps | Goals | Apps | Goals | Apps | Goals | Apps | Goals | Apps | Goals | Apps | Goals | A yellow rectangle, denoting the yellow penalty card shown to a player being cautioned | A red rectangle, denoting the red penalty card shown to a player being sent off |
|---|---|---|---|---|---|---|---|---|---|---|---|---|---|---|---|---|---|
| 1 | GK | WAL | Boaz Myhill* | 42 | 0 | 0 | 0 | 0 | 0 | 0 | 0 | 5 | 0 | 47 | 0 | 1 | 0 |
| 2 | DF | IRE | Stephen Carr | 20 | 0 | 0 | 0 | 1 | 0 | 0 | 0 | 3 | 0 | 24 | 0 | 4 | 0 |
| 3 | DF | ENG | David Murphy | 30 (3) | 4 | 2 | 0 | 4 | 1 | 1 | 0 | 7 | 2 | 44 (3) | 7 | 6 | 1 |
| 4 | DF | SCO | Steven Caldwell | 43 | 0 | 0 | 0 | 2 (1) | 0 | 0 | 0 | 6 | 0 | 51 (1) | 0 | 7 | 0 |
| 5 | DF | ESP | Pablo Ibáñez | 7 (6) | 0 | 2 | 0 | 2 | 0 | 1 | 0 | 5 | 0 | 17 (6) | 0 | 0 | 0 |
| ~~6~~† | DF | ENG | Liam Ridgewell | 13 (1) | 0 | — | | 1 | 0 | 0 | 0 | 3 (1) | 0 | 17 (2) | 0 | 4 | 0 |
| 6 | DF | ENG | Peter Ramage* | 14 | 0 | 2 | 0 | 0 | 0 | 0 | 0 | 0 | 0 | 16 | 0 | 1 | 0 |
| 7 | MF | SCO | Chris Burke | 45 (1) | 13 | 2 | 0 | 1 (3) | 0 | 1 | 0 | 5 (3) | 1 | 54 (7) | 14 | 6 | 0 |
| 8 | MF | SEN | Guirane N'Daw* | 17 (2) | 0 | 1 (1) | 0 | 2 | 0 | 1 | 0 | 4 (1) | 0 | 25 (4) | 0 | 6 | 0 |
| 9 | FW | JAM | Marlon King | 37 (3) | 16 | 2 | 0 | 0 (1) | 0 | 0 (1) | 0 | 2 (3) | 2 | 41 (8) | 18 | 3 | 0 |
| ~~10~~† | FW | ENG | Cameron Jerome | 0 (1) | 0 | — | | 0 | 0 | 0 | 0 | 0 | 0 | 0 (1) | 0 | 0 | 0 |
| 10 | FW | NOR | Erik Huseklepp* | 4 (7) | 2 | 0 | 0 | 0 | 0 | 0 | 0 | 0 | 0 | 4 (7) | 2 | 0 | 0 |
| ~~11~~† | MF | CHI | Jean Beausejour | 22 | 1 | — | | 1 (1) | 0 | 1 | 0 | 6 | 1 | 30 (1) | 2 | 6 | 0 |
| 11 | MF | ENG | Andros Townsend* | 11 (4) | 0 | 1 | 0 | 0 | 0 | 0 | 0 | 0 | 0 | 12 (4) | 0 | 0 | 0 |
| 12 | MF | ENG | Jordon Mutch | 18 (3) | 1 | 2 | 0 | 5 | 0 | 0 | 0 | 0 (1) | 0 | 25 (4) | 1 | 5 | 1 |
| 13 | GK | IRE | Colin Doyle | 4 (1) | 0 | 2 | 0 | 5 | 0 | 1 | 0 | 3 | 0 | 15 (1) | 0 | 0 | 0 |
| 14 | MF | SEN | Morgaro Gomis | 13 (3) | 0 | 0 | 0 | 5 | 0 | 0 (1) | 0 | 2 | 0 | 20 (4) | 0 | 4 | 0 |
| ~~15~~† | DF | ENG | Scott Dann | 0 | 0 | — | | 0 | 0 | 0 | 0 | 0 | 0 | 0 | 0 | 0 | 0 |
| 15 | MF | ENG | Wade Elliott | 15 (14) | 2 | 1 | 0 | 5 | 2 | 0 | 0 | 5 | 1 | 26 (14) | 5 | 4 | 0 |
| 17 | FW | IRE | Adam Rooney | 6 (12) | 4 | 0 | 0 | 5 | 2 | 1 | 0 | 5 | 1 | 17 (12) | 7 | 3 | 0 |
| 18 | MF | IRE | Keith Fahey | 34 (1) | 4 | 0 | 0 | 1 (2) | 0 | 1 | 0 | 5 | 0 | 41 (3) | 4 | 0 | 0 |
| 19 | FW | SRB | Nikola Žigić | 20 (15) | 11 | 1 | 1 | 1 | 0 | 0 (1) | 0 | 4 (1) | 0 | 26 (17) | 12 | 9 | 0 |
| 20 | MF | ESP | Enric Vallès | 0 | 0 | 0 | 0 | 0 | 0 | 0 | 0 | 0 | 0 | 0 | 0 | 0 | 0 |
| ~~21~~† | MF | ESP | Míchel | 0 | 0 | — | | 0 | 0 | 0 | 0 | 0 | 0 | 0 | 0 | 0 | 0 |
| 22 | MF | ENG | Nathan Redmond | 5 (19) | 5 | 1 (1) | 0 | 5 | 1 | 1 | 0 | 4 (1) | 1 | 16 (21) | 7 | 2 | 0 |
| 23 | DF | USA | Jonathan Spector | 31 | 0 | 1 (1) | 0 | 4 (1) | 0 | 1 | 0 | 8 | 0 | 45 (2) | 0 | 7 | 0 |
| 24 | DF | ENG | Curtis Davies | 42 | 5 | 2 | 0 | 5 | 0 | 1 | 0 | 4 | 0 | 54 | 5 | 9 | 1 |
| 25 | FW | NLD | Akwasi Asante | 0 | 0 | 0 | 0 | 0 | 0 | 0 | 0 | 0 (1) | 0 | 0 (1) | 0 | 0 | 0 |
| 26 | GK | ENG | Jack Butland | 0 | 0 | 0 | 0 | 0 | 0 | 0 | 0 | 0 | 0 | 0 | 0 | 0 | 0 |
| 28 | DF | IRL | Cian Hughton | 0 | 0 | 0 | 0 | 0 | 0 | 0 | 0 | 0 | 0 | 0 | 0 | 0 | 0 |
| 34 | MF | FRA | Eddy Gnahoré | 0 | 0 | 0 | 0 | 0 (1) | 0 | 0 | 0 | 0 | 0 | 0 (1) | 0 | 0 | 0 |
| 35 | MF | ENG | Callum Reilly | 0 | 0 | 0 | 0 | 0 (1) | 0 | 0 | 0 | 0 | 0 | 0 (1) | 0 | 0 | 0 |
| 36 | FW | ENG | Jake Jervis | 0 | 0 | 0 | 0 | 0 (1) | 0 | 0 | 0 | 0 (1) | 0 | 0 (2) | 0 | 0 | 0 |
| 37 | MF | ENG | Luke Hubbins | 0 | 0 | 0 | 0 | 0 | 0 | 0 | 0 | 0 | 0 | 0 | 0 | 0 | 0 |
| 38 | DF | SCO | Fraser Kerr | 0 | 0 | 0 | 0 | 0 | 0 | 0 | 0 | 0 | 0 | 0 | 0 | 0 | 0 |
| 39 | FW | NZL | Chris Wood* | 13 (10) | 9 | — | | 0 | 0 | 0 | 0 | 2 (4) | 2 | 15 (14) | 11 | 0 | 0 |
| 43 | DF | ENG | Mitch Hancox | 0 | 0 | 0 | 0 | 0 | 0 | 0 | 0 | 0 | 0 | 0 | 0 | 0 | 0 |
