= 2009–10 Birmingham City F.C. season =

Birmingham City F.C.
2009–10 season
- Chairman: David Gold until October 2009; Vico Hui
- Manager: Alex McLeish
- Ground: St Andrew's
- Premier League: 9th
- FA Cup: Sixth round
- League Cup: Third round
- Top goalscorer: Cameron Jerome (11)
- Highest home attendance: 28,958 vs Chelsea, 26 December 2009
- Lowest home attendance: 9,399 vs Nottingham Forest, FA Cup 3rd round replay, 12 January 2007
- Average home league attendance: 25,246
Home colours	Away colours

The 2009–10 season was Birmingham City Football Club's sixth season in the Premier League and their 56th in the first tier of English football. The side was managed by former Scotland manager Alex McLeish, who successfully guided the side to promotion from the Championship the previous season.

== Review ==
=== Carson Yeung takeover ===
Following his unsuccessful attempt to purchase the club during the 2007–08 season, Carson Yeung returned to complete a deal to purchase Birmingham City.

On 20 August, Carson Yeung's Hong Kong Stock Exchange-listed Grandtop International placed a deposit of £3 million ahead of a new proposed takeover bid. This was quickly followed by Yeung's decision to donate £5 million to the club for the purchase of Middlesbrough's Tuncay, but such a gift would have broken HKSE rules, and the player signed for Stoke City instead.

The takeover date was put back from October to mid-November, because of a delay to the EGM required to approve the issue of an additional 50% shares, following his capture of a £57m bridging loan to cover the purchase of the club.

Formal documents outlining Yeung's £1-per-share offer were sent out to club shareholders in mid-September. By 24 September, he had acceptances on 81.7% of the shares, including the holdings of former owners David Sullivan, David Gold and Ralph Gold, and by the closing date of 6 October, the takeover was complete, with acceptances in respect of 94% of the shares, a level allowing a compulsory purchase of the remainder.

At a press conference on 15 October, the board and executive was named as: Yeung himself, president; Michael Wiseman, vice-president; Vico Hui, chairman; Peter Pannu and Sammy Yu, vice chairmen; and Michael Dunford, chief executive. The name of the holding company was changed from Grandtop International to Birmingham International Holdings.

== Chronological list of events ==
The following is a list of all significant events to occur during the 2009–10 season. This list does not include transfers, which are listed in the transfer section, or results, which are listed in the matches section.

- 7 July: The club broke its transfer record by signing Christian Benítez from Mexican side Santos Laguna for a fee that will rise to $12.5 million (around £7.75m).
- 7 August: Co-owner David Sullivan and managing director Karren Brady were told that no further action would be taken against them after a two-year investigation into corruption in football.
- 14 August: Vice-chairman Jack Wiseman died at the age of 92.
- 17 November: Former Aberdeen player Malky Thomson is appointed as reserve team manager.
- 8 January: Alex McLeish was awarded the manager of the month award for December.
- 3 February: Former Birmingham goalkeeper and manager Gil Merrick died at the age of 88.

== Pre-season ==
Pre-season friendly match details
Date	Opponents	Venue	Result	Score F–A	Scorers	Attendance	Report
21 July 2009	VfB Stuttgart	N	L	0–2		876	
23 July 2009	FC Augsburg	N	L	0–2		c. 400	
26 July 2009	Al-Hilal	N	L	0–3			
29 July 2009	Dagenham & Redbridge	A	W	1–0	Bent 77'	1,022	
1 August 2009	Nottingham Forest	A	L	1–2	Carsley 79'	6,735	
4 August 2009	Crewe Alexandra	A	L	1–4	McFadden 18'	1,827	
8 August 2009	Sporting de Gijón	H	D	0–0		10,360	

== Premier League ==
=== Match details ===
General sources (match reports): Match content not verifiable from these sources is referenced individually.

Date	League position	Opponents	Venue	Result	Score F–A	Scorers	Attendance	Refs
16 August 2009	13th	Manchester United	A	L	0–1		75,062	
19 August 2009	9th	Portsmouth	H	W	1–0	McFadden 90+2' pen.	19,922	
22 August 2009	7th	Stoke City	H	D	0–0		21,694	
29 August 2009	11th	Tottenham Hotspur	A	L	1–2	Bowyer 75'	35,318	
13 September 2009	15th	Aston Villa	H	L	0–1		25,196	
19 September 2009	11th	Hull City	A	W	1–0	O'Connor 75'	23,759	
26 September 2009	14th	Bolton Wanderers	H	L	1–2	Phillips 84'	28,671	
3 October 2009	15th	Burnley	A	L	1–2	Larsson 90+5'	20,102	
17 October 2009	16th	Arsenal	A	L	1–3	Bowyer 38'	60,028	
24 October 2009	14th	Sunderland	H	W	2–1	Ridgewell 37', McFadden 48'	21,723	
1 November 2009	14th	Manchester City	H	D	0–0		21,462	
9 November 2009	15th	Liverpool	A	D	2–2	Benítez 26', Jerome 45+3'	42,560	
21 November 2009	12th	Fulham	H	W	1–0	Bowyer 16'	23,659	
29 November 2009	11th	Wolverhampton Wanderers	A	W	1–0	Bowyer 3'	26,668	
5 December 2009	8th	Wigan Athletic	A	W	3–2	Larsson (2) 61', 72', Benítez 66'	18,797	
12 December 2009	8th	West Ham United	H	W	1–0	Bowyer 52'	28,203	
15 December 2009	6th	Blackburn Rovers	H	W	2–1	Jerome (2) 12', 48'	23,187	
20 December 2009	7th	Everton	A	D	1–1	Larsson 22'	33,660	
26 December 2009	8th	Chelsea	H	D	0–0		28,958	
28 December 2009	7th	Stoke City	A	W	1–0	Jerome 50'	27,211	
9 January 2010	8th	Manchester United	H	D	1–1	Jerome 39'	28,907	
27 January 2010	8th	Chelsea	A	L	0–3		41,293	
30 January 2010	8th	Tottenham Hotspur	H	D	1–1	Ridgewell 90+1'	27,238	
7 February 2010	8th	Wolverhampton Wanderers	H	W	2–1	Phillips (2) 80', 85'	24,165	
10 February 2010	8th	West Ham United	A	L	0–2		34,458	
21 February 2010	10th	Fulham	A	L	1–2	Baird 3' o.g.	21,758	
27 February 2010	8th	Wigan Athletic	H	W	1–0	McFadden 45+2' pen.	25,921	
9 March 2010	8th	Portsmouth	A	W	2–1	Jerome (2) 16', 42'	18,465	
13 March 2010	8th	Everton	H	D	2–2	Jerome 26', Gardner 52'	24,579	
20 March 2010	9th	Sunderland	A	L	1–3	Jerome 60'	37,962	
24 March 2010	9th	Blackburn Rovers	A	L	1–2	McFadden 55'	23,856	
27 March 2010	9th	Arsenal	H	D	1–1	Phillips 90+2'	27,039	
4 April 2010	9th	Liverpool	H	D	1–1	Ridgewell 56'	27,909	
11 April 2010	9th	Manchester City	A	L	1–5	Jerome 42'	45,209	
17 April 2010	9th	Hull City	H	D	0–0		26,669	
25 April 2010	9th	Aston Villa	A	L	0–1		42,788	
1 May 2010	9th	Burnley	H	W	2–1	Jerome 29', Benítez 41'	24,578	
9 May 2010	9th	Bolton Wanderers	A	L	1–2	McFadden 77'	22,863	

=== League table ===
Pos	Team	Pld	W	D	L	GF	GA	GD	Pts	Qualification or relegation
7	Liverpool	38	18	9	11	61	35	+26	63	Qualification for the Europa League third qualifying round (Note: Originally Portsmouth qualified for the third qualifying round of the Europa League as the FA Cup runners-up, replacing the winners, Champions League-qualified Chelsea. However, they failed to apply for a UEFA licence. Therefore, Liverpool as the best placed team not qualified for the European competitions took their place.)
8	Everton	38	16	13	9	60	49	+11	61	
9	Birmingham City	38	13	11	14	38	47	−9	50	
10	Blackburn Rovers	38	13	11	14	41	55	−14	50	
11	Stoke City	38	11	14	13	34	48	−14	47	

Source: Barclays Premier League

=== Results summary ===
Overall								Home						Away					
Pld	W	D	L	GF	GA	GD	Pts	W	D	L	GF	GA	GD	W	D	L	GF	GA	GD
38	13	11	14	38	47	−9	50	8	9	2	19	13	+6	5	2	12	19	34	−15

== FA Cup ==
FA Cup match details
Round	Date	Opponents	Venue	Result	Score F–A	Scorers	Attendance	Report
Third round	2 January 2010	Nottingham Forest	A	D	0–0		20,975	
Third round replay	12 January 2010	Nottingham Forest	H	W	1–0	Ferguson 62'	9,399	
Fourth round	23 January 2010	Everton	A	W	2–1	Benítez 7', Ferguson 40'	30,875	
Fifth round	13 February 2010	Derby County	A	W	2–1	Dann 73', Ridgewell 90+3'	21,043	
Sixth round	6 March 2010	Portsmouth	A	L	0–2		20,456	

== League Cup ==
Birmingham entered the 2009–10 League Cup in the second round. The draw saw them travel down to the south coast to play League One team Southampton for the second time in consecutive seasons. Goals from midfielders Lee Carsley and Lee Bowyer cancelled out Adam Lallana's strike to see Birmingham progress to the next round 2–1. In the third round, Birmingham visited fellow Premier League side Sunderland. An early goal from Jordan Henderson and a strike by Fraizer Campbell midway through the first half was enough to see Birmingham knocked out of the cup 2–0.

League Cup match details
Round	Date	Opponents	Venue	Result	Score F–A	Scorers	Attendance	Report
Second round	25 August 2009	Southampton	A	W	2–1	Bowyer 77', Carsley 80'	11,753	
Third round	22 September 2009	Sunderland	A	L	0–2		20,576	

== Appearances and goals ==
Numbers in parentheses denote appearances as substitute.
Players with squad numbers struck through and marked † left the club during the playing season.
Players with names in italics and marked * were on loan from another club for the whole of their season with Birmingham.

Players included in matchday squads
No.	Pos	Nat	Name	League		FA Cup		League Cup		Total		Discipline	
No.	Pos	Nat	Name	Apps	Goals	Apps	Goals	Apps	Goals	Apps	Goals	A yellow rectangular card	A red rectangular card
1	GK	NIR	Maik Taylor	2	0	0	0	2	0	4	0	0	0
2	DF	IRE	Stephen Carr	35	0	4	0	1	0	39	0	10	0
3	DF	ENG	David Murphy	0	0	0	0	0	0	0	0	0	0
4	MF	ENG	Lee Bowyer	34 (1)	5	4 (1)	0	1 (1)	1	39 (3)	6	9	0
~~5~~†	DF	ENG	Martin Taylor	0	0	0	0	0	0	0	0	0	0
6	DF	ENG	Liam Ridgewell	30 (1)	3	5	1	1	0	36 (1)	4	4	0
7	MF	SWE	Sebastian Larsson	26 (7)	4	4	0	1	0	32 (7)	4	3	0
8	FW	SCO	Garry O'Connor	5 (5)	1	0	0	1 (1)	0	6 (6)	1	2	0
9	FW	ENG	Kevin Phillips	2 (17)	4	1 (3)	0	1	0	4 (20)	4	0	0
10	FW	ENG	Cameron Jerome	32	11^{a}	4	0	0	0	36	11	5	0
11	FW	ECU	Christian Benítez	21 (9)	3	3 (2)	1	1	0	25 (11)	4	1	0
12	MF	SCO	Barry Ferguson	37	0	5	2	1	0	43	2	9	1
13	GK	IRE	Colin Doyle	0	0	0	0	0	0	0	0	0	0
14	DW	ENG	Roger Johnson	38	0	5	0	0	0	43	0	8	0
15	DW	ENG	Scott Dann	30	0	4	1	1	0	35	1	4	0
16	FW	SCO	James McFadden	32 (4)	5	4	0	0 (1)	0	36 (5)	5	6	0
~~17~~†	DF	ECU	Giovanny Espinoza	0	0	0	0	2	0	2	0	2	0
17	MF	ESP	Míchel	3 (6)	0	0	0	0	0	3 (6)	0	1	0
18	MF	IRE	Keith Fahey	18 (16)	0	3 (2)	0	0 (1)	0	21 (19)	0	2	0
19	MF	ENG	Gary McSheffrey	1 (4)	0	0 (2)	0	2	0	3 (6)	0	1	0
20	DF	FRA	Franck Queudrue	6	0	0	0	1	0	7	0	0	0
21	DF	ENG	Stuart Parnaby	6 (2)	0	1	0	2	0	9 (2)	0	2	0
22	MF	NIR	Damien Johnson	0 (1)	0	1 (1)	0	0	0	1 (2)	0	0	0
23	FW	ENG	Marcus Bent	0	0	0	0	0	0	0	0	0	0
24	MF	IRE	Jay O'Shea	0 (1)	0	0	0	2	0	2 (1)	0	0	0
25	GK	ENG	Joe Hart*	36	0	5	0	0	0	41	0	4	0
26	MF	IRE	Lee Carsley	3 (4)	0	1	0	1	1	5 (4)	1	1	0
27	DF	FRA	Grégory Vignal	6 (2)	0	1	0	0	0	7 (2)	0	3	0
28	MF	FIN	Teemu Tainio*	5 (1)	0	0	0	0	0	5 (1)	0	0	0
29	MF	ENG	Ashley Sammons	0	0	0	0	1	0	1	0	0	0
30	DF	ENG	Dan Preston	0	0	0	0	0 (1)	0	0 (1)	0	1	0
31	MF	ENG	Jordon Mutch	0	0	0	0	0	0	0	0	0	0
32	MF	ENG	Jake Jervis	0	0	0 (1)	0	0	0	0 (1)	0	0	0
33	MF	ENG	Craig Gardner	10 (3)	1	0 (2)	0	0	0	10 (5)	1	4	0
34	MF	ENG	Nathan Redmond	0	0	0	0	0	0	0	0	0	0

a. Soccerbase's stats exclude Birmingham's opening goal against Burnley on 1 May, originally credited as a Brian Jensen own goal but awarded to Jerome by the Dubious Goals Panel.

== Transfers ==
Before the start of the season, Stephen Carr was given a new two-year contract and Cameron Jerome signed a five-year deal. Youngsters Jacob Rowe and Shaun Timmins were given their first professional one-year contracts and Jared Wilson received a one-year extension.

=== In ===
Date	Player	Club†	Fee	Ref
12 June 2009	Scott Dann	Coventry City	Undisclosed	
24 June 2009	Giovanny Espinoza	Barcelona SC	Undisclosed	
25 June 2009	Roger Johnson	Cardiff City	£5m	
7 July 2009	Christian Benítez	Santos Laguna	Undisclosed	
8 July 2009	Lee Bowyer	(West Ham United)	Free	
13 July 2009	Artur Krysiak	(Birmingham City)	Free	
17 July 2009	Barry Ferguson	Rangers	£1.2m	
10 August 2009	Jay O'Shea	Galway United	Undisclosed	
13 August 2009	Grégory Vignal	RC Lens	Undisclosed	
11 January 2010	Michel	Sporting de Gijón	£3m	
26 January 2010	Craig Gardner	Aston Villa	£3m	

† Brackets round club names indicate the player's contract with that club had expired before he joined Birmingham.

=== Out ===
Date	Player	Fee	Joined†	Ref
12 January 2010	Giovanny Espinoza	Released	(Unión Española)	
19 January 2010	Krystian Pearce	Free	Huddersfield Town	
29 January 2010	Martin Taylor	Free	Watford	
1 February 2010	Damien Johnson	Free	Plymouth Argyle	
30 June 2010	Lee Carsley	Released	(Coventry City)	
30 June 2010	Artur Krysiak	Released	(Exeter City)	
30 June 2010	Gary McSheffrey	Released	(Coventry City)	
30 June 2010	Franck Queudrue	Released	(RC Lens)	
30 June 2010	Jacob Rowe	Released		
30 June 2010	Shaun Timmins	Released		
30 June 2010	Grégory Vignal	Released	(Atromitos)	
30 June 2010	Jared Wilson	Released		

† Brackets round club names denote the player joined that club after his Birmingham City contract expired.

=== Loan in ===
Date	Player	Club	Return	Ref
24 June 2009	Joe Hart	Manchester City	End of season	
1 September 2009	Teemu Tainio	Sunderland	End of season	

=== Loan out ===
Date	Player	Club	Return	Ref
1 July 2009	Robin Shroot	Burton Albion	January 2010	
20 July 2009	Krystian Pearce	Peterborough United	11 January 2010	
10 August 2009	Artur Krysiak	Burton Albion	End of season	
30 October 2009	Marcus Bent	Middlesbrough	16 January 2011	
26 November 2009	Jordon Mutch	Hereford United	2 January 2011	
23 December 2009	Jacob Rowe	Redditch United	One month	
26 January 2010	Jordon Mutch	Doncaster Rovers	One month	
29 January 2010	Gary McSheffrey	Leeds United	End of season	
1 February 2010	Marcus Bent	Queens Park Rangers	End of season	

=== Transfer notes ===
- It is believed that the fee paid for Scott Dann is in the region of £3.5 million.
- Birmingham City did not mention an official cost for Giovanny Espinoza. Newspaper reports suggest that the fee was lower than €600,000 (£375,000).
- A fee and personal terms for Benítez were agreed on 3 June 2009, but were later renegotiated after a problem with Benítez's knee was discovered during his medical. Benítez officially joined the club on 7 July 2009. The fee for Benítez is thought to be $2 million (about £1.2 million) rising to $12.5 million (about £7.75 million) with add-ons, and also includes a 'get out' clause that will see him return to Mexico at the end of the season if his knee problem becomes serious.
- It was announced on 15 May 2009 that Artur Krysiak would be released from the club when his contract expired on 30 June 2009. It was later announced that the side had re-signed the Polish goalkeeper.
- Radhi Jaïdi, Stephen Kelly and Mehdi Nafti all left the club when their contracts expired. Kelly joined Fulham, while Nafti joined Greek side Aris Thessaloniki. Jaïdi signed for Southampton on 2 September 2009.
- Robin Shroot was originally loaned out to Burton Albion for the season, but was later cancelled, with the player returning to Birmingham on 1 January.
- Artur Krysiak's loan deal with Burton Albion was originally a one-month loan deal. This was extended until January on 1 September. The deal was further extended on 24 December to cover the remainder of the season.
- Jordon Mutch's loan deal to Hereford United, and later to Doncaster Rovers, were both Football League Youth Loans. This meant he would still be eligible for Birmingham City reserve and academy fixtures, but Hereford/Doncaster fixtures would take priority if on the same day.
