= Michael Dunford =

Michael Dunford may refer to:

- Michael Dunford (football executive)
- Michael Dunford (musician)
