= Akwasi Asante =

Dutch footballer (born 1992)

Personal information
- Full name: Akwasi Asante
- Date of birth: 6 September 1992 (age 34)
- Place of birth: Amsterdam, Netherlands
- Height: 6 ft 0 in (1.83 m)
- Position: Striker

Youth career
- 1999–2003: Neerlandia/SLTO
- 2003–2005: Blauw-Wit Amsterdam
- 2005: HFC Haarlem
- 2006–2008: Wednesbury Sports Union
- 2008–2011: Birmingham City

Senior career*
Years	Team	Apps	(Gls)
2011–2014	Birmingham City	0	(0)
2012	→ Northampton Town (loan)	4	(1)
2013	→ Shrewsbury Town (loan)	7	(1)
2013	→ Shrewsbury Town (loan)	1	(0)
2014–2015	Kidderminster Harriers	10	(0)
2015–2017	Solihull Moors	61	(28)
2017–2018	Grimsby Town	9	(1)
2017	→ Solihull Moors (loan)	10	(0)
2018–2019	Tamworth	24	(5)
2018	→ Chester (loan)	3	(5)
2019–2020	Chester	33	(22)
2020	Gloucester City	9	(8)
2020–2023	Chesterfield	62	(20)
2023–2024	Darlington	8	(0)
- * Club domestic league appearances and goals as of 11:25, 25 May 2024 (UTC)

Akwasi Asante (born 6 September 1992) is a Dutch footballer who plays as a striker.

Asante began his senior career in England with Birmingham City. He made his first-team debut in the Europa League play-off round second leg against C.D. Nacional in August 2011, and made his debut in the Football League while on loan at Northampton Town in January 2012. He had spells on loan at Shrewsbury Town in both 2012–13 and 2013–14, but injury disrupted his progress, and he left Birmingham when his contract expired. Without a club while recovering from injury, he spent the latter part of the 2014–15 season with Kidderminster Harriers before moving on to Solihull Moors, with whom he won the National League North title. Asante signed for Grimsby Town in January 2017, after missing the first couple of months of 2017–18 recovering from injury, he went on loan to Solihull Moors, however, he left Grimsby by mutual consent in February 2018. He completed the season with Tamworth, and after a short spell on loan at Chester, he joined them permanently in January 2019. He spent the first few months of the 2020–21 season with Gloucester City, then joined Chesterfield, where his three-year stay was again interrupted by injuries, and spent six months with Darlington.

== Club career ==
=== Early life and career ===
Asante was born in Amsterdam to Ghanaian parents. He played at amateur club Neerlandia, which then merged with two other clubs to form Blauw-Wit Amsterdam. As a youngster he had interested Ajax, but he chose to join HFC Haarlem's youth academy, where he spent three years before the family moved to the UK when he was 13. He played for Wednesbury Sports Union in the Walsall Junior Youth League before joining Birmingham City F.C.'s Academy, where he began a two-year scholarship in July 2009.

In the 2010–11 season, Birmingham chose not to enter a reserve team in a competitive league, but Asante was a regular member of the under-18 Academy team and played in the Birmingham Senior Cup. In October 2010 he scored five goals as the under-18s beat Tottenham Hotspur's under-18s 6–0. This performance contributed to his first competitive involvement with the first team a few days later, when he was named among the substitutes for the League Cup fourth-round tie against Brentford. Asante signed his first professional contract, of two and a half years, in January 2011. Injury kept him out for four months, but he was an unused substitute for Birmingham's last two Premier League games of the season, against Fulham and Tottenham Hotspur.

=== Senior football ===
He was part of the Birmingham squad for their 2011 pre-season visit to Ireland, and came close to scoring in the second half of the friendly against Cork City, when he appeared to be brought down after touching the ball past the goalkeeper, but no penalty was awarded. In the absence through injury of strikers Cameron Jerome, Marlon King and Nikola Žigić, Asante was named in the 20-man squad for Birmingham's Europa League match against Nacional in Madeira in August. An unused substitute in the first leg, he made his first-team debut in the second leg on 25 August, replacing Chris Burke in the 88th minute as Birmingham won 3–0 to qualify for the group stage.

On 1 January 2012, Asante moved to Northampton Town of League Two on a one-month loan deal. He went straight into the starting eleven for their match the following day, away to Shrewsbury Town, and after 22 minutes he collected a cross from Lewis Young and rounded the goalkeeper to set up the opening goal for Saido Berahino. The match finished as a 1–1 draw. In his second game for the club, he "took advantage of a slip by his marker to carry the ball inside another challenge and smack a right-footed shot inside Barry Roche's near post", his first league goal which proved to be the winner as Northampton beat Morecambe 2–1. He returned to Birmingham at the end of the month having scored once from three appearances.

Asante was part of the Birmingham squad that went on a tour to Austria ahead of the 2012–13 season. He was preferred to Žigić for the visit of Bolton Wanderers in September because manager Lee Clark wanted a striker with pace available among the substitutes if needed. He tore a hamstring playing for the development squad in October. The injury took considerably longer than expected to heal, and Asante did not return to development squad duty until March 2013. Ahead of the transfer deadline, Asante joined Shrewsbury Town on loan until the end of the League One season, and made his debut as a late substitute in a 2–2 draw away to Carlisle United. In seven games for Shrewsbury he scored once, the third goal in a 3–2 defeat of Portsmouth on the last day of the season.

Asante signed a new one-year contract with Birmingham in June 2013, with an option for the club to extend it for a second year. He rejoined Shrewsbury on loan, initially for a month, ahead of the 2013–14 season. A hamstring injury delayed his second debut for the club until the fourth match of the season, a 2–0 win at home to Swindon Town. Birmingham recalled Asante on 19 August as cover, with two strikers injured and another free to leave the club. However, injury prevented his involvement in Birmingham's next match and disrupted his season. He returned to action in April 2014 with four goals in a development squad match against Huddersfield Town, leading manager Lee Clark to suggest he might still have a future at the club, but it was later confirmed that he would leave when his contract expired at the end of the season.

=== Kidderminster Harriers ===
Asante was without a club for some months while recovering from injury. On 16 December 2014, he signed for Conference Premier club Kidderminster Harriers until the end of the season. He made his debut as a second-half substitute as Kidderminster beat Lincoln City with a goal in stoppage time, and finished his spell with 11 appearances without scoring.

=== Solihull Moors ===
He then moved on to National League North club Solihull Moors, for whom he appeared regularly, as starter or substitute in about equal measure. Asante was part of the Solihull Moors team during the 2015–16 season that secured promotion to the National League for the first time in their history, clinching the National League North title. In May 2016, Asante played in the Birmingham Senior Cup final as Solihull Moors won the competition for the first time, beating Birmingham City 2–1 at St Andrew's.

=== Grimsby Town ===
On 18 January 2017, Asante signed an 18-month contract with newly promoted League Two club Grimsby Town.

Injury meant Asante missed the last few weeks of the season and the first couple of months of 2017–18. To regain match fitness, he returned to Solihull Moors in mid-October on loan until January 2018. On 7 February 2018, Asante left Grimsby by mutual consent.

=== Tamworth ===
On 9 February 2018, Akwasi was unveiled as a Tamworth player, signing an 18-month contract under new caretaker manager Mike Fowler, who suggested that Asante could help fill the void left by the departure of Reece Styche to National League North rivals Darlington. He scored 3 goals from 14 league appearances in what remained of the season, at the end of which Tamworth were relegated to the Southern League. He was not a regular starter in the 2018–19 season, and at the end of November 2018, he joined National League North club Chester on a month's loan, with a view to a permanent move.

=== Chester ===
Asante went straight into the starting eleven for the match on 1 December, at home to Darlington, and scored a perfect hat-trick – one headed goal, one right-footed and one left-footed – to complete a 3–1 win. He scored in each of his next two matches, and completed a permanent move to Chester on 3 January 2019, signing an 18-month contract. The undisclosed fee was a club record. However, knee damage sustained in the final match of his loan spell kept him out until 9 February, by which time Chester had dropped out of the play-off places. On his return, he scored in each of his first two league matches, but was soon out of action with a recurrence of the previous injury. From mid-March onwards, he played in six matches and scored twice as Chester finished ninth in the table. He hoped that full participation in pre-season training would help him play a greater part in 2019–20.

He missed the first two weeks of pre-season with hamstring trouble, and a groin strain in a friendly kept him out of the first three matches of the new season. On his first appearance, he came on as a second-half substitute and converted a stoppage-time penalty to secure a draw away to Kettering Town on 13 August. Over the next four weeks of the campaign, he played seven matches and scored ten more goals, including a hat-trick at AFC Telford United that took Chester second in the table. By the time the season was abandoned because of the COVID-19 pandemic, he had 19 goals from 29 matches in all competitions.

=== Gloucester City ===
On 5 June 2020, Asante signed for National League North club Gloucester City. He scored eight goals in the first nine league matches of the season.

=== Chesterfield ===
Manager James Rowe left Gloucester for National League club Chesterfield on 26 November 2020. The following day, having met a clause in the player's contract that allowed him to move to a higher-level club, Asante became Rowe's first signing. Asante made his debut for the club that weekend, and scored his side's first goal as they came back from 1–0 down to beat Weymouth 2–1. After scoring nine goals in fifteen appearances in all competitions for the club since joining, Asante signed a new contract on 5 March 2021 that would keep him at the club until 2024, rewarding the club's decision with his tenth goal the following day in a 3–0 victory over Yeovil Town. Five weeks later, he ruptured an ACL and was ruled out for an estimated nine months.

Asante returned to first-team action on 28 December 2021, playing the first hour of a 1–1 draw with FC Halifax Town. During his third appearance, he scored Chesterfield's goal in a 5–1 loss to 2021 Champions League winners Chelsea in the third round of the FA Cup. He scored six goals from 23 league appearances, helping his side reach the play-offs, but an injury kept him out of that campaign, in which Chesterfield lost to Solihull Moors in the semi-final. He was transfer-listed at the end of the season, but regained form and a place in the side. However, injuries again intervened, he played little in the second half of the 2022–23 season and not at all in 2023–24, and he left the club by mutual consent on 8 November 2023.

=== Darlington ===
Asante signed for National League North club Darlington on 14 November 2023. Although the player had recovered from injury, manager Josh Gowling said he would need a "mini pre-season" to regain fitness. He was a regular in the matchday squad for the first few weeks, but injury again intervened. He made the last of his nine appearances in the final match of the season, and his contract was cancelled by mutual consent in May 2024.

== Career statistics ==
As of end of 2023–24 season

Appearances and goals by club, season and competition
Club	Season	League			FA Cup		League cup (Note: Includes Football League Cup, Southern League Cup)		Other		Total	
Club	Season	Division	Apps	Goals	Apps	Goals	Apps	Goals	Apps	Goals	Apps	Goals
Birmingham City	2011–12	Championship	0	0	0	0	0	0	1 (Note: Appearance in UEFA Europa League)	0	1	0
Birmingham City	2012–13	Championship	0	0	0	0	0	0	—		0	0
Birmingham City	2013–14	Championship	0	0	0	0	0	0	—		0	0
Birmingham City	Total		0	0	0	0	0	0	1	0	1	0
Northampton Town (loan)	2011–12	League Two	4	1	—		—		—		4	1
Shrewsbury Town (loan)	2012–13	League One	7	1	—		—		—		7	1
Shrewsbury Town (loan)	2013–14	League One	1	0	—		0	0	—		1	0
Shrewsbury Town (loan)	Total		8	1	—		0	0	—		8	1
Kidderminster Harriers	2014–15	Conference Premier	10	0	—		—		1 (Note: Appearance(s) in FA Trophy)	0	11	0
Solihull Moors	2015–16	National League North	39	17	3	2	—		6 (Note: Three appearances and one goal in FA Trophy, three appearances and one goal in Birmingham Senior Cup)	2	48	21
Solihull Moors	2016–17	National League	22	11	3	1	—		2 (Note: One appearance in FA Trophy, one in Birmingham Senior Cup)	0	27	12
Solihull Moors	Total		61	28	6	3	—		8	2	75	33
Grimsby Town	2016–17	League Two	9	1	—		—		—		9	1
Grimsby Town	2017–18	League Two	0	0	—		—		—		0	0
Grimsby Town	Total		9	1	—		—		—		9	1
Solihull Moors (loan)	2017–18	National League	10	0	1	0	—		0	0	11	0
Tamworth	2017–18	National League North	14	3	—		—		—		14	3
Tamworth	2018–19	Southern League Premier Division Central	10	2	1	0	2	1	3 (Note: One appearance in FA Trophy, two in Birmingham Senior Cup)	0	16	3
Tamworth	Total		24	5	1	0	2	1	3	0	30	6
Chester	2018–19	National League North	11	9	—		—		1 (Note: Appearance in Cheshire Senior Cup)	0	12	9
Chester	2019–20	National League North	25	18	1	0	—		3	1	29	19
Chester	Total		36	27	1	0	—		4	1	41	28
Gloucester City	2020–21	National League North	9	8	1	0	—		0	0	10	8
Chesterfield	2020–21	National League	22	10	—		—		2	0	24	10
Chesterfield	2021–22	National League	24	6	1	1	—		0	0	25	7
Chesterfield	2022–23	National League	16	4	3	1	—		1	0	20	5
Chesterfield	2023–24	National League	0	0	0	0	—		—		0	0
Chesterfield	Total		62	20	4	2	—		3	0	69	22
Darlington	2023–24	National League North	8	0	—		—		1	0	9	0
Career total			241	91	14	5	2	1	21	3	278	100

== Honours ==
Solihull Moors

- National League North: 2015–16
- Birmingham Senior Cup: 2015–16
