= Michael Dunford (football executive) =

British sports executive

Michael John Dunford
- Born: June 1953 (age 72)
- Occupation: Football Administrator
- Title: Chairman
- Predecessor: Ian Moorcroft

Michael John Dunford is a football administrator, who is the ex Chairman at Tiverton Town Football Club.

== Career ==
His first role in football came as General Manager of Derby County, a role he was at from July 1992 until 5 November 1994. On 11 November 1994 Dunford was appointed as Everton's club secretary. At Everton he was promoted from within to the role of Chief Executive in 1999.

In 2004 Dunford left Everton and became CEO of Plymouth Argyle, a role he remained at until 2009.

From there he became CEO at then Premier League club Birmingham City in October 2009. He had succeeded Karren Brady to the post, which he resigned from in April 2010, only six months after his appointment.

He served from 2013 til 2016 at Crawley Town. In January 2017 he became CEO of National League 1 rugby union side Plymouth Albion, a role he resigned from after less than 6 weeks in the job, in protest to the club making all non-playing staff redundant.

From November 2017 til May 2018 he served as CEO at Chesterfield as they got relegated from EFL League Two. He left the Spireites to re-join Plymouth Argyle.

In June 2023, Tiverton Town FC announced that they had appointed Michael as their Chairman.
