= Vico Hui =

- Traditional Chinese: 許浩略
- Simplified Chinese: 许浩略
- Hanyu Pinyin: Xǔ Hàolüè
- Yale Romanization: Héui Houh-leuhk

Vico Hui Ho Luek (born 1965 or 1966) is a Hong Kong–based businessman.

Until June or July 2012, he was the chairman of the English football club Birmingham City F.C. and chief executive officer of Birmingham International Holdings.
