= Birmingham Sports Holdings =

Chinese investment holding company

- Formerly: Grandtop Sports Holdings Limited; Birmingham International Holdings
- Traded as: SEHK: 2309
- Industry: Holding company Association football Property development
- Headquarters: Hong Kong (head office); The Cayman Islands (Incorporated Office); Birmingham, England, UK (major business)
- Key people: Wenqing Zhao (Chairman); Dongfeng Huang (CEO); Pui Huan Yam (CFO)
- Revenue: (Loss) HK$59.8 million (2016)
- Total assets: HK$374,537,000 (2016)
- Owner: Trillion Trophy Asia (60.78%); Wang Lei (5%)
- Website: irasia.com/birminghamint

Birmingham Sports Holdings (Chinese: 伯明翰體育控股有限公司) is an investment holding company owned by Chinese businessman Paul Suen through his investment company Trillion Trophy Asia.

== History ==
Registered in the Cayman Islands, Grandtop International Holdings Limited (GIH), through its subsidiaries (Dollar Concept International Ltd., Fanlink Far East Ltd., Sun Ace Group Ltd., Leader Ahead Investments Ltd., East Step Trading Ltd. and Gala Consultants Group Limited.), engages in sourcing and trading apparel. It is involved in trading sportswear and other apparel, and provision of entertainment services in Hong Kong, Macau, and the United Kingdom. The company is based in Central, Hong Kong.

=== Birmingham City FC takeover ===
In 2007, GIH bought 29.9% of shares in the English Premier League football club Birmingham City F.C. They followed this with an offer to buy the club, but failed to meet the completion deadline of 22 December. In Summer 2009, GIH made another offer to buy the club, taking full control from 1 October in an £81.5million deal.

It became the intention of Grandtop, subject to shareholder approval, to change the company name to Birmingham International Holdings Limited.

The ownership has changed over the years. In March 2011, new shares were issued (from 3,187,753,400 to 3,637,753,400), of which Carson Yeung held 16.25% and in April, Yeung through his British Virgin Islands (BVI) company, bought 315,000,000 shares from the public, meaning he owned 24.91%. On 4 May, extra new shares – issued to independent third parties – made Yeung's ratio decrease to 23.3%. However, on 12 May Yeung's company bought 170,000,000 shares, meaning he owned a total of 26.31%. The total shares owned by other major shareholders Vico Hui and Liu Xingcheng (Chinese: 劉星成) remained unchanged, but the ratio changed in 2011. Although Yeung bought the shares of the company, he also injected other business into the company, meaning he received money from the company. Yeung was arrested in 2011 for money laundering.

On 4 June 2012, Birmingham International Holdings announced that former England footballer Steve McManaman and Yang Yuezhou had resigned as executive directors. The latter was also deputy chairman.

=== Takeover by Trillion Trophy Asia Ltd. ===
On Monday 17 October 2016, Birmingham International Holdings Limited began trading once again on the Hong Kong stock exchange after a takeover fronted by Paul Suen, and his company Trillion Trophy Asia (TTA). TTA bought 60.78% of BIH through Ernst & Young, receivers who were acting on behalf of the board of BIH. This left Carson Yeung with around 6% of the shares of BIH. Mr. Suen had already provided Birmingham City Plc with a loan facility capable of continuing their existence and to bring the football club out of financial uncertainty. In February 2017 the company announced that board wishes to change the company name to Birmingham Sports Holdings Ltd.

On 6 April 2017, the company name was changed to Birmingham Sports Holdings.

=== Australia and Western Melbourne Group ===
It was revealed in February 2019 that BSH had been a part of the newly formed Western Melbourne FC club in the Australian A-League competition, initially funding the bid's license fee, but reportedly pulling out of the project due to a downturn in the Australian housing market that devalued the intended housing developments that were to be built in the same area as their new stadium. After their withdrawal from the project, local property developer Aziz Kheir took over as owner.
