= Carson Yeung =

Hong Kong businessman (born 1960)

Carson Yeung 楊家誠
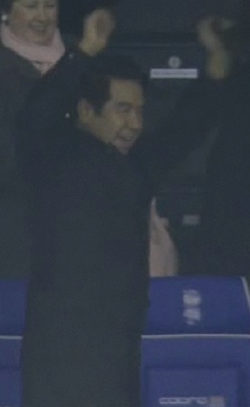
- Yeung in 2010
- Born: Carson Yeung Ka Sing; 27 February 1960 (age 66)
- Occupation: Businessman
- Years active: 1990s–present
- Title: President, Birmingham City F.C. (2007–14)

Carson Yeung
- Traditional Chinese: 楊家誠
- Simplified Chinese: 杨家诚
- Jyutping: Joeng^{4} Gaa^{1} Sing^{4}
- Hanyu Pinyin: Yáng Jiāchéng
Transcriptions
Standard Mandarin
- Hanyu Pinyin: Yáng Jiāchéng
- Wade–Giles: Yang Chia-ch'eng
- Yale Romanization: Yáng Jyāchéng
- IPA: [jǎŋ tɕjáʈʂʰə̌ŋ]
Yue: Cantonese
- Yale Romanization: Yeùhng Gāa Sìhng
- Jyutping: Joeng^{4} Gaa^{1} Sing^{4}
- IPA: [jœ̏ːŋ káːsɪ̏ŋ]

Carson Yeung Ka Sing (Chinese: 楊家誠; born 27 February 1960) is a Hong Kong businessman who, until February 2014, was the president of English football club Birmingham City F.C., and chairman and an executive director of Birmingham International Holdings (previously Grandtop International Holdings), an investment, entertainment and sportswear firm registered in the Cayman Islands, which owns that club. He is also a director of Universal Energy Resources Holdings and Universal Management Consultancy Ltd.

In March 2014, Yeung was convicted on five counts of money laundering and sentenced to six years' imprisonment. He is currently serving his sentence after the Hong Kong Court of Final Appeal rejected his final appeal.

== Career ==
=== Early years ===
At the age of 12 he moved to London before returning to Hong Kong to work. Up until the 1990s he was in a Tsim Sha Tsui barber shop called "Vanity", and was trained as a hairdresser.

=== Investments ===
Yeung began his investment career making his first fortune in the Hong Kong Real Estate industry. In 1997, he began having financial trouble caused by the Asian financial crisis. He tried to recover by investing in penny stocks in 1999 to use shares to cover failed shares.

According to the BBC, he "made his fortune on penny stocks in neighbouring Macau."

In 2004, he co-founded "Greek Mythology", a casino in Macau. He was also once the head of a Human Resources department at a gas company.

==== Football ====
Yeung was the chairman of Hong Kong First Division outfit Hong Kong Rangers from 2005 to 2006. In 2005, he made an £80,000 donation to the local football association after buying shirts worn by famous English footballers at auction.

In 2007, he unsuccessfully attempted to take over Birmingham City. Yeung failed to deliver the money for the takeover by the deadline of 30 November 2007 and as a result the takeover bid fell through. He was held responsible for the club's U-turn on the contract offered to manager Steve Bruce in May 2007, which led to Bruce's decision to resign from the club and move to Wigan Athletic F.C. of November that year.

On 12 August 2009, Birmingham City confirmed that Yeung's Grandtop International Holdings held 29.9% of the club's shares and had made a further offer.

On 21 August 2009, it was reported that Grandtop had made an offer of £81.51 million for Birmingham City Football Club. The Standard reported on 25 August 2009 that Yeung had offered £57 million (HK$729 million) to buy newly promoted Birmingham City, and had reportedly promised the club's manager Alex McLeish £50 million to buy new players. His Hong Kong-listed Grandtop International already had a 29.9 percent stake in the club. He said the firm would raise HK$785 million for the acquisition through a rights issue.

On 6 October 2009, Yeung completed his protracted takeover of Birmingham City F.C. At the time, it was claimed some of his appointees have had run-ins with the law.

Yeung stepped down from all club-related positions, including those of football club president, football club PLC chairman, and holding company chairman and director, in February 2014.

==== Property ====
Yeung has been a real estate investor in Chongqing, Liaoning and Inner Mongolia. In November 2007 he was looking to sell off residential and commercial developments to Golden Resorts Group (黃金集團) but had difficulties in selling them. In addition, Beijing was stepping up measures to cool off the mainland property market, which affected his revenue streams. Similar issues occurred in 2011 when he tried to sell plots of land in Liaoning. He ran into debt in a number of sectors owing millions to HSBC, and many others. He had to borrow large amounts of money and put his luxury home up for sale at Mid-levels. On 4 June 2012, the High Court ordered Carson Yeung Ka-sing to vacate and hand over a HK$300 million mansion on Barker Road to Wing Hang Bank within 56 days after he failed to repay a loan of HK$50 million.

==== Money laundering ====
On 29 June 2011, Yeung was arrested at his home in Hong Kong in connection with alleged money laundering. Police officers also swooped on the offices of Birmingham International, and left with an assortment of documents. A brief statement mentioned that Narcotics Bureau officers searched two locations – one on Hong Kong Island and the other in Kowloon – and seized documents. The charges involved five counts of dealing with property known or believed to represent proceeds of an indictable offence. His hearing was adjourned until 11 August 2011, and was remanded on bail of HK$7 million (US$900,000).

Yeung was supposed to travel on 14 September 2011 to attend to his duties at Birmingham City football club. Given permission to travel after his cash bail was doubled to HK$8 million the prosecution appealed on the grounds there was a risk of him not returning. The High Court allowed an appeal and reversed the ruling made in August by the District Court and gave him permission to leave Hong Kong for England. Yeung's trial opened in May 2013 and lasted until March 2014, when he was found guilty on five counts of money laundering a total of HK$720 million and was sentenced to six years' imprisonment. The trial judge, Douglas Yau, commented that Yeung was "not a witness of truth", and that his sentence included a necessary element of deterrence.

On 13 May 2015, the Hong Kong Court of Appeal dismissed Yeung's appeal against conviction. Yeung abandoned his appeal against his sentence.

On 14 August 2015, the Hong Kong Court of Final Appeal granted Yeung leave to appeal his conviction and released him on HK$7 million bail and cash surety of HK$6 million. Yeung was ordered to surrender his travel documents and not to leave Hong Kong. On 12 July 2016, the Court of Final Appeal rejected Yeung's appeal and he was immediately taken back into custody.

== See also ==
- Sing Pao Daily News, owned by Carson Yeung
