= 2018–19 Macclesfield Town F.C. season =

Macclesfield Town F.C.
2018–19 season
- Chairman: Mark Blower
- Manager: Mark Yates (until 8 October); Sol Campbell (from 27 November)
- Stadium: Moss Rose
- League Two: 22nd
- FA Cup: First round
- EFL Cup: Third round
- EFL Trophy: Second round
- Top goalscorer: League: Scott Wilson (10); All: Scott Wilson (11)

The 2018–19 season was Macclesfield Town's first season back in League Two after gaining promotion the season before.

== Competitions ==
=== Pre-season friendlies ===
| 17 July 2018 Friendly | Altrincham | 1–0 | Macclesfield Town | Altrincham |
| 19:45 BST | Peers 8' | Report | | Stadium: Moss Lane; Attendance: 485 |

| 20 July 2018 Friendly | Macclesfield Town | 0–2 | Burnley | Macclesfield |
| 19:45 BST | | Report | Lennon 36'; Guðmundsson 48' | Stadium: Moss Rose |

| 24 July 2018 Friendly | Macclesfield Town | 1–1 | Wrexham | Macclesfield |
| 19:30 BST | Smith 77' | Report | Smith 24' | Stadium: Moss Rose |

| 28 July 2018 Friendly | Stockport County | 1–1 | Macclesfield Town | Stockport |
| 15:00 BST | Palmer 29' | | Smith 19' | Stadium: Edgeley Park |

=== League Two ===
==== League table ====
| Pos | Team | Pld | W | D | L | GF | GA | GD | Pts | Promotion, qualification or relegation |
|---|---|---|---|---|---|---|---|---|---|---|
| 20 | Port Vale | 46 | 12 | 13 | 21 | 39 | 55 | −16 | 49 | |
| 21 | Cambridge United | 46 | 12 | 11 | 23 | 40 | 66 | −26 | 47 | |
| 22 | Macclesfield Town | 46 | 10 | 14 | 22 | 48 | 74 | −26 | 44 | |
| 23 | Notts County (R) | 46 | 9 | 14 | 23 | 48 | 84 | −36 | 41 | Relegation to the National League |
| 24 | Yeovil Town (R) | 46 | 9 | 13 | 24 | 41 | 66 | −25 | 40 | Relegation to the National League |

Source: EFL Official Website
Rules for classification: 1) Points; 2) Goal difference; 3) Number of goals scored; 4) Head-to-head results
(R) Relegated

==== Results summary ====
| Overall | | | | | | | | Home | | | | | | Away | | | | | |
| Pld | W | D | L | GF | GA | GD | Pts | W | D | L | GF | GA | GD | W | D | L | GF | GA | GD |
|---|---|---|---|---|---|---|---|---|---|---|---|---|---|---|---|---|---|---|---|
| 46 | 10 | 14 | 22 | 48 | 74 | −26 | 44 | 5 | 11 | 7 | 26 | 35 | −9 | 5 | 3 | 15 | 22 | 39 | −17 |

Last updated: 4 May 2019.
Source: BBC

==== Results by matchday ====
| Matchday | 1 | 2 | 3 | 4 | 5 | 6 | 7 | 8 | 9 | 10 | 11 | 12 | 13 | 14 | 15 | 16 | 17 | 18 | 19 | 20 | 21 | 22 | 23 | 24 | 25 | 26 | 27 | 28 | 29 | 30 | 31 | 32 | 33 | 34 | 35 | 36 | 37 | 38 | 39 | 40 | 41 | 42 | 43 | 44 | 45 | 46 |
|---|---|---|---|---|---|---|---|---|---|---|---|---|---|---|---|---|---|---|---|---|---|---|---|---|---|---|---|---|---|---|---|---|---|---|---|---|---|---|---|---|---|---|---|---|---|---|
| Ground | A | H | A | H | H | A | A | H | A | H | A | H | A | H | H | A | H | A | H | A | A | H | H | A | A | H | H | A | H | A | A | H | H | A | A | H | A | H | A | H | H | A | A | H | A | H |
| Result | L | L | L | D | D | L | L | L | L | D | D | L | L | W | L | L | L | L | W | W | L | W | D | W | L | D | L | W | W | L | L | D | D | D | L | L | W | D | D | D | W | L | L | D | W | D |
| Position | 15 | 23 | 23 | 23 | 23 | 23 | 23 | 23 | 24 | 24 | 24 | 24 | 24 | 24 | 24 | 24 | 24 | 24 | 24 | 24 | 24 | 24 | 24 | 23 | 23 | 23 | 23 | 23 | 23 | 23 | 23 | 23 | 23 | 23 | 23 | 23 | 23 | 23 | 24 | 24 | 22 | 22 | 22 | 22 | 22 | 22 |

Updated to match(es) played on 4 May 2019. Source: Statto.com
A = Away; H = Home; W = Win; D = Draw; L = Loss

==== Matches ====
On 21 June 2018, the League Two fixtures for the forthcoming season were announced.

| 4 August 2018 1 | Swindon Town | 3–2 | Macclesfield Town | Swindon |
| 15:00 BST | Doughty 48', 90', 90' (2 pen.) | Report | Arthur 46', 55' | Stadium: County Ground; Attendance: 7,024; Referee: Robert Lewis |

| 11 August 2018 2 | Macclesfield Town | 0–2 | Grimsby Town | Macclesfield |
| 15:00 BST | | Report | Cook 29'; Vernam 90' | Stadium: Moss Rose; Attendance: 2,589; Referee: Oliver Langford |

| 18 August 2018 3 | Oldham Athletic | 3–1 | Macclesfield Town | Oldham |
| 15:00 BST | Surridge 16'; Branger 53'; Miller 90' | Report | Rose 60' | Stadium: Boundary Park; Attendance: 4,330; Referee: Andy Haines |

| 21 August 2018 4 | Macclesfield Town | 1–1 | Cheltenham Town | Macclesfield |
| 19:45 BST | Whitaker 19' | Report | Duku 85' | Stadium: Moss Rose; Attendance: 1,496; Referee: Paul Marsden |

| 25 August 2018 5 | Macclesfield Town | 1–1 | Mansfield Town | Macclesfield |
| 15:00 BST | Smith 63' | Report | Benning 32' | Stadium: Moss Rose; Attendance: 2,624; Referee: Anthony Backhouse |

| 1 September 2018 6 | Crewe Alexandre | 3–0 | Macclesfield Town | Crewe |
| 15:00 BST | Kirk 17'; Bowery 40', 68' | Report | | Stadium: Gresty Road; Attendance: 3,915; Referee: Carl Boyeson |

| 8 September 2018 7 | Stevenage | 1–0 | Macclesfield Town | Stevenage |
| 15:00 BST | Newton 41' | Report | | Stadium: Broadhall Way; Attendance: 2,282; Referee: Sen Stockbridge |

| 15 September 2018 8 | Macclesfield Town | 1–2 | Lincoln City | Macclesfield |
| 15:00 BST | Grimes 83' | Report | Pett 21'; Shackell 87' | Stadium: Moss Rose; Attendance: 2,589; Referee: John Busby |

| 22 September 2018 9 | Morecambe | 2–1 | Macclesfield Town | Morecambe |
| 15:00 BST | Leitch-Smith 61'; Fleming 77' | Report | Rose (red card) 38'; Whitaker 72' | Stadium: Globe Arena; Attendance: 1,622; Referee: Geoff Eltringham |

| 29 September 2018 10 | Macclesfield Town | 1–1 | Forest Green Rovers | Macclesfield |
| 15:00 BST | Wilson 55' | Report | Grubb 48' | Stadium: Moss Rose; Attendance: 1,503; Referee: Graham Salisbury |

| 2 October 2018 11 | Newport County | 3–3 | Macclesfield Town | Newport |
| 19:45 BST | Butler 29'; Demetriou 59' (pen.); Matt 90+7' | Report | Kelleher 6'; Fitzpatrick 11' (pen.), 82' (pen.) | Stadium: Rodney Parade; Attendance: 2,624; Referee: Trevor Kettle |

| 6 October 2018 12 | Macclesfield Town | 0–1 | Notts County | Macclesfield |
| 15:00 BST | Vincenti (yellow card) 52'; O'Hara (yellow card) 80' | Report | Brisley (yellow card) 64'; Stead 82' (pen.) | Stadium: Moss Rose; Attendance: 2,381; Referee: Matt Donohue |

| 12 October 2018 13 | Tranmere Rovers | 1–0 | Macclesfield Town | Birkenhead |
| 19:45 BST | Gilmour 74' | Report | | Stadium: Prenton Park; Attendance: 6,797; Referee: Anthony Backhouse |

| 20 October 2018 14 | Macclesfield Town | 2–1 | Carlisle United | Macclesfield |
| 15:00 BST | Rose 79' (pen.); Vincenti 83' | Report | Nadesan 50' | Stadium: Moss Rose; Attendance: 2,153; Referee: Michael Salisbury |

| 23 October 2018 15 | Macclesfield Town | 0–5 | Northampton Town | Macclesfield |
| 19:45 BST | | Report | Crooks 23', 33', 43'; Powell 34'; Pierre 90+3' | Stadium: Moss Rose; Attendance: 1,517; Referee: Seb Stockbridge |

| 27 October 2018 16 | Cambridge United | 1–0 | Macclesfield Town | Cambridge |
| 15:00 BST | Taylor (yellow card) 61'; Ibehre 80' | Report | Smith (yellow card) 72' | Stadium: Abbey Stadium; Attendance: 3,946; Referee: Craig Hicks |

| 3 November 2018 17 | Macclesfield Town | 1–4 | Bury | Macclesfield |
| 15:00 GMT | Stephens 30'; Smith (yellow card) 45' | Report | Danns 14', 18'; O'Shea 44'; Maynard 60' | Stadium: Moss Rose; Attendance: 2,485; Referee: Ross Joyce |

| 17 November 2018 18 | Milton Keynes Dons | 2–0 | Macclesfield Town | Denbigh |
| 15:00 GMT | Aneke 52'; Agard 65' | Report | | Stadium: Stadium mk Attendance: 7,087; Referee: Andre Marriner |

| 24 November 2018 19 | Macclesfield Town | 1–0 | Yeovil Town | Macclesfield |
| 15:00 GMT | Rose 72' (pen.) | Report | | Stadium: Moss Rose; Attendance: 1,570; Referee: Paul Marsden |

| 27 November 2018 20 | Exeter City | 0–1 | Macclesfield Town | Exeter |
| 19:45 GMT | | Report | Smith 54' | Stadium: St James Park; Attendance: 3,070; Referee: Brett Huxtable |

| 8 December 2018 21 | Colchester United | 1–0 | Macclesfield Town | Colchester |
| 15:00 GMT | Mandron 29' | Report | | Stadium: Colchester Community Stadium; Attendance: 3,099; Referee: Neil Hair |

| 15 December 2018 22 | Macclesfield Town | 2–0 | Crawley Town | Macclesfield |
| 15:00 GMT | Durrell 31'; Smith 85' | Report | Maguire (yellow card) 19' | Stadium: Moss Rose; Attendance: 1,362; Referee: Kevin Johnson |

| 22 December 2018 23 | Macclesfield Town | 0–0 | Port Vale | Macclesfield |
| 15:00 GMT | Stephens (yellow card) 44'; Pearson (yellow card) 68' | Report | Quigley (yellow card) 73' | Stadium: Moss Rose; Attendance: 3,951; Referee: Darren Drysdale |

| 26 December 2018 24 | Notts County | 1–2 | Macclesfield Town | Nottingham |
| 15:00 GMT | Hemmings 27' | Report | Wilson 36,81' | Stadium: Meadow Lane Stadium; Attendance: 6,786 |

| 29 December 2018 25 | Carlisle United | 2–1 | Macclesfield Town | Carlisle |
| 15:00 GMT | Gerrard (yellow card) 14'; Devitt (yellow card) 40'; Hope 44'; Yates (yellow card) 51' (goal) 88' | Report | Wilson 2'; Cameron (yellow card) 51' | Stadium: Brunton Park; Attendance: 4,884; Referee: Ross Joyce |

| 1 January 2019 26 | Macclesfield Town | 1–1 | Tranmere Rovers | Macclesfield |
| 15:00 GMT | Grimes (yellow card) 27'; Arthur 41' | Report | Jennings 32' (yellow card) 75'; Monthé (yellow card) 73' | Stadium: Moss Rose; Attendance: 3,398; Referee: Michael Salisbury |

| 5 January 2019 27 | Macclesfield Town | 1–2 | Swindon Town | Macclesfield |
| 15:00 GMT | Marsh 14'; Kelleher (yellow card) 44' | Report | Carroll (yellow card) 25'; Woolfenden (yellow card) 31'; Richards 37'; McCourt (yellow card) 70' (goal) 90+2'; Anderson (yellow card) 84'; Woolery (yellow card) 85' | Stadium: Moss Rose; Attendance: 1,964; Referee: Scott Oldham |

| 12 January 2019 28 | Grimsby Town | 0–2 | Macclesfield Town | Cleethorpes |
| 15:00 GMT | Ring (yellow card) 83' | Report | Arthur (yellow card) 5'; Marsh 26'; Wilson 33' (yellow card) 53' | Stadium: Blundell Park; Attendance: 4,694; Referee: Seb Stockbridge |

| 19 January 2019 29 | Macclesfield Town | 2–1 | Oldham Athletic | Macclesfield |
| 15:00 GMT | Smith 45+3'; Wilson 54' | Report | Vera 1' (pen.); Clarke (yellow card) 19'; Sylla (yellow card) 21'; Edmundson (yellow card) 45+1'; Maouche (red card) 90+2' | Stadium: Moss Rose; Attendance: 3,697; Referee: Ollie Yates |

| 26 January 2019 30 | Cheltenham Town | 3–2 | Macclesfield Town | Cheltenham |
| 15:00 GMT | Broom (yellow card) 2'; Varney 54'; Maddox 61'; Raglan 79' | Report | Rose 11' (pen.) (yellow card) 19'; Cameron (red card) 20'; Wilson 23'; Smith (yellow card) 31'; Lowe (yellow card) 74'; Welch-Hayes (yellow card) 82' | Stadium: Whaddon Road; Attendance: 3,041; Referee: Anthony Backhouse |

| 2 February 2019 31 | Mansfield Town | 3–1 | Macclesfield Town | Mansfield |
| 15:00 GMT | Grant 8'; Pearce 56'; Walker 89' | Report | Evans 42'; Ntambwe (yellow card) 64' | Stadium: Field Mill; Attendance: 5,642; Referee: Michael Salisbury |

| 9 February 2019 32 | Macclesfield Town | 3–3 | Crewe Alexandra | Macclesfield |
| 15:00 GMT | Wilson 15'; O'Hara (yellow card) 32'; Smith (yellow card) 66'; Cameron 74'; Cole 90+7' | Report | Bowery 3'; Porter 32' (pen.); Ray (yellow card) 84' (goal) 90+5' | Stadium: Moss Rose; Attendance: 3,772; Referee: Geoff Eltringham |

| 16 February 2019 33 | Macclesfield Town | 1–1 | Colchester United | Macclesfield |
| 15:00 GMT | Wilson 44'; Smith (yellow card) 57'; Welch-Hayes (yellow card) 90+4' | Report | Nouble (yellow card) 12' (goal) 47' (pen.) | Stadium: Moss Rose; Attendance: 2,092; Referee: Andy Haines |

| 23 February 2019 34 | Crawley Town | 1–1 | Macclesfield Town | Crawley |
| 15:00 GMT | Willock (yellow card) 54'; Sesay (yellow card) 57'; Dallison (yellow card) 65'; Young 84'; McNerney (yellow card) 86' | Report | Smith 40'; Rose (yellow card) 45+2'; Demetriou (yellow card) 50'; Wilson (yellow card) 66' | Stadium: Broadfield Stadium; Attendance: 2,190; Referee: Alan Young |

| 2 March 2019 35 | Bury | 3–0 | Macclesfield Town | Bury |
| 15:00 GMT | Maynard 24'; O'Shea 75' (pen.); Wharton 90+4' | Report | | Stadium: Gigg Lane; Attendance: 4,277; Referee: Eddie Ilderton |

| 9 March 2019 36 | Macclesfield Town | 1–3 | Milton Keynes Dons | Macclesfield |
| 15:00 GMT | Cameron 19'; Jules (yellow card) 90' | Report | Wheeler 44'; Brittain 53'; Aneke (yellow card) 66'; Agard 79'; Hesketh (yellow card) 90' | Stadium: Moss Rose; Attendance: 2,017; Referee: Charles Breakspear |

| 12 March 2019 P | Macclesfield Town | P–P | Exeter City | Macclesfield |
| 19:45 GMT | | Report | | Stadium: Moss Rose |
Note: The fixture was postponed due to a waterlogged pitch.

| 16 March 2019 37 | Yeovil Town | 0–2 | Macclesfield Town | Yeovil |
| 15:00 GMT | Fisher (yellow card) 68'; Gafaiti (yellow card) 78' | Report | Pearson 18'; Smith 33'; Cameron (yellow card) 53'; Durrell (yellow card) 82' | Stadium: Huish Park; Attendance: 2,899; Referee: Gavin Ward |

| 23 March 2019 38 | Macclesfield Town | 2–2 | Stevenage | Macclesfield |
| 15:00 GMT | Durrell 42'; Stephens (yellow card) 61'; Rose (yellow card) 78'; Whitaker 90+3' | Report | Nugent 44'; Newton 52' | Stadium: Moss Rose; Attendance: 1,866; Referee: Dean Whitestone |

| 30 March 2019 39 | Lincoln City | 1–1 | Macclesfield Town | Lincoln |
| 15:00 GMT | Eardley 38'; Toffolo (yellow card) 79' | Report | Wilson 28'; Cameron (yellow card) 80' | Stadium: Sincil Bank; Attendance: 9,567; Referee: Brett Huxtable |

| 6 April 2019 40 | Macclesfield Town | 1–1 | Morecambe | Macclesfield |
| 15:00 BST | Durrell 33' | Report | Mills 26' | Stadium: Moss Rose; Attendance: 2,072; Referee: Lee Probert |

| 9 April 2019 41 | Macclesfield Town | 3–2 | Exeter City | Macclesfield |
| 19:45 BST | Smith 30', 85'; Rose 45+4' (pen.); Cole (yellow card) 45+5'; Durrell (yellow card) 90+6' | Report | Bowman 27', 34'; Brown (yellow card) 45+5'; Moxey (yellow card) 90+4' | Stadium: Moss Rose; Attendance: 1,588; Referee: Sebastian Stockbridge |

| 13 April 2019 42 | Forest Green Rovers | 2–0 | Macclesfield Town | Nailsworth |
| 15:00 BST | Doidge 56'; Mills 88' | Report | Whitaker (yellow card) 64'; Kelleher (yellow card) 71' | Stadium: The New Lawn; Attendance: 2,386; Referee: Craig Hicks |

| 19 April 2019 43 | Northampton Town | 3–1 | Macclesfield Town | Northampton |
| 15:00 BST | Bowditch 25'; Powell 54'; Pierre (yellow card) 85'; Morias 90+2' | Report | Smith 38' (yellow card) 75' | Stadium: Sixfields Stadium; Attendance: 4,925; Referee: Kevin Johnson |

| 22 April 2019 44 | Macclesfield Town | 0–0 | Newport County | Macclesfield |
| 15:00 BST | Kelleher (yellow card) 45+1'; O'Hara (yellow card) 50' | Report | | Stadium: Moss Rose; Attendance: 2,269; Referee: Matt Donohue |

| 27 April 2019 45 | Port Vale | 0–1 | Macclesfield Town | Burslem |
| 15:00 BST | | Report | Fitzpatrick 66' | Stadium: Vale Park; Attendance: 5,414; Referee: Carl Boyeson |

| 4 May 2019 46 | Macclesfield Town | 1–1 | Cambridge United | Macclesfield |
| 12:30 BST | Durrell 66'; Smith (yellow card) 90' | Report | Lewis 44'; Coulson (yellow card) 73' | Stadium: Moss Rose; Attendance: 3,986; Referee: John Busby |

=== FA Cup ===
The first round draw was made live on BBC by Dennis Wise and Dion Dublin on 22 October.

| 10 November 2018 First round | Maidstone United | 2–1 | Macclesfield Town | Maidstone |
| 15:00 GMT | Powell 51'; Turgott 69' (pen.) | Report | Stephens 14' | Stadium: Gallagher Stadium; Attendance: 2,169; Referee: Neil Hair |

=== EFL Cup ===
On 15 June 2018, the draw for the first round was made in Vietnam. The second round draw was made from the Stadium of Light on 16 August. The third round draw was made on 30 August 2018 by David Seaman and Joleon Lescott.

| 14 August 2018 First round | Macclesfield Town | 1–1 (4–2 p) | Bradford City | Macclesfield |
| 19:45 BST | Kelleher 60' | Report | Colville 62' | Stadium: Moss Rose; Attendance: 1,422; Referee: Jeremy Simpson |

| 28 August 2018 Second round | Walsall | 3–3 (1–3 p) | Macclesfield Town | Walsall |
| 19:45 BST | Morris 33'; Cook 63'; Gordon 64' | Report | Grimes 10'; Smith 25'; Marsh 90+1' | Stadium: Bescot Stadium; Attendance: 2,352; Referee: Darren Drysdale |
| | Penalties |
| | Cook (penalty missed); Leahy (penalty missed); Kouhyar (penalty scored); Morris (penalty missed) | | Whitaker (penalty scored); Smith (penalty scored); Fitzpatrick (penalty scored) |

| 26 September 2018 Third round | West Ham United | 8–0 | Macclesfield Town | Stratford |
| 19:45 BST | Antonio 29'; Snodgrass 32', 60'; Pérez 40'; Fredericks 51'; Ogbonna 54'; Diangana 67', 82' | Report | | Stadium: London Stadium; Attendance: 24,833; Referee: Craig Pawson |

=== EFL Trophy ===
On 13 July 2018, the initial group stage draw bar the U21 invited clubs was announced. The draw for the second round was made live on Talksport by Leon Britton and Steve Claridge on 16 November.

| Pos | Lge | Team | Pld | W | PW | PL | L | GF | GA | GD | Pts | Qualification |
|---|---|---|---|---|---|---|---|---|---|---|---|---|
| 1 | L1 | Accrington Stanley | 3 | 2 | 0 | 0 | 1 | 8 | 5 | +3 | 6 | Round 2 |
| 2 | L2 | Macclesfield Town | 3 | 1 | 1 | 0 | 1 | 6 | 8 | −2 | 5 | Round 2 |
| 3 | L1 | Blackpool | 3 | 1 | 0 | 1 | 1 | 7 | 7 | 0 | 4 | |
| 4 | ACA | West Bromwich Albion U21 | 3 | 1 | 0 | 0 | 2 | 4 | 5 | −1 | 3 | |

Source: EFL.com

| 4 September 2018 Group stages | Macclesfield Town | 3–3 (5–3 p) | Blackpool | Macclesfield |
| 19:45 BST | Blissett 14'; Rose 36', 79' (pen.) | Report | Guy 32'; O'Sullivan 90+1'; O'Connor 90+5' | Stadium: Moss Rose; Attendance: 639; Referee: Chris Sarginson |
| | Penalties |
| | Whitaker (penalty scored); Smith (penalty scored); Fitzpatrick (penalty scored); Smith (penalty scored); Rose (penalty scored) | | Pritchard (penalty scored); Taylor (penalty scored); Heneghan (penalty scored); Bola (penalty missed) |

| 9 October 2018 Group stages | Accrington Stanley | 4–1 | Macclesfield Town | Accrington |
| 19:45 BST | Finley 35'; Zanzala 63'; Fitzpatrick 80' (o.g.); Barlaser 90+5' | Report | Vincenti 58' | Stadium: Crown Ground; Attendance: 900 |

| 13 November 2018 Group stages | Macclesfield Town | 2–1 | West Bromwich Albion U21 | Macclesfield |
| 19:45 GMT | Stephens 19'; Arthur 24' | Report | Tulloch 14' | Stadium: Moss Rose; Attendance: 411 |

| 4 December 2018 Second round | Newcastle United U21 | 1–1 (5–3 p) | Macclesfield Town | Newcastle upon Tyne |
| 19:00 GMT | Sørensen 23' | Report | Wilson 84' | Stadium: St James' Park; Attendance: 1,126 |
| | Penalties |
| | Bailey (penalty scored); Roberts (penalty scored); Gibson (penalty scored); Watts (penalty scored); Sangare (penalty scored) | | Smith (penalty scored); Stephens (penalty missed); Lowe (penalty scored); Wilson (penalty scored) |

== Transfers ==
=== Transfers in ===
| Date from | Position | Nationality | Name | From | Fee | Ref. |
|---|---|---|---|---|---|---|
| 1 July 2018 | CF | (England) | Nathan Blissett | Plymouth Argyle | Free transfer | |
| 1 July 2018 | DM | (England) | Callum Evans | Forest Green Rovers | Free transfer | |
| 1 July 2018 | CB | (England) | Jamie Grimes | Cheltenham Town | Free transfer | |
| 1 July 2018 | CF | (England) | Ben Stephens | Stratford Town | Undisclosed | |
| 1 July 2018 | CB | (England) | Miles Welch-Hayes | Bath City | Undisclosed | |
| 4 July 2018 | CF | (England) | Harry Smith | Millwall | Free transfer | |
| 16 July 2018 | RB | (England) | James Pearson | Kidderminster Harriers | Free transfer | |
| 20 July 2018 | DM | (England) | Michael Rose | Morecambe | Free transfer | |
| 20 July 2018 | GK | (Wales) | Rhys Taylor | AFC Fylde | Free transfer | |
| 2 August 2018 | GK | (England) | Luke Simpson | York City | Free transfer | |
| 9 August 2018 | RM | (Jersey) | Peter Vincenti | Coventry City | Free transfer | |
| 16 November 2018 | CB | (England) | Nathan Cameron | Bury | Free transfer | |
| 28 December 2018 | GK | (England) | Emmanuel Idem | Aston Villa | Free transfer | |
| 11 January 2019 | LM | (Ghana) | Enoch Andoh | Nuneaton Borough | Free transfer | |
| 11 January 2019 | RW | (England) | Adam Dawson | AFC Telford United | Free transfer | |
| 28 January 2019 | CB | (Scotland) | Zak Jules | Shrewsbury Town | Free transfer | |
| 28 January 2019 | LB | (Cyprus) | Stelios Demetriou | (Scotland) Ross County | Free transfer | |
| 31 January 2019 | CF | (England) | Shamir Mullings | Maidstone United | Free transfer | |
| 1 February 2019 | DM | (Belgium) | Brice Ntambwe | (Scotland) Partick Thistle | Free transfer | |
| 4 February 2019 | LW | (Curaçao) | Liandro Martis | Leicester City | Free transfer | |

=== Transfers out ===
| Date from | Position | Nationality | Name | To | Fee | Ref. |
|---|---|---|---|---|---|---|
| 1 July 2018 | RB | (Republic of Ireland) | Noe Baba | (Republic of Ireland) Waterford | Released | |
| 1 July 2018 | SS | (Italy) | Diego De Girolamo | Buxton | Released | |
| 1 July 2018 | GK | (Iraq) | Shwan Jalal | Chesterfield | Released | |
| 1 July 2018 | LB | (England) | Mitch Hancox | Milton Keynes Dons | Free transfer | |
| 1 July 2018 | CB | (England) | Ahmed Ibrahim | Free agent | Released | |
| 1 July 2018 | CB | (England) | Kieran Kennedy | Shrewsbury Town | Undisclosed | |
| 1 July 2018 | CB | (England) | George Pilkington | Retired | —N/a | |
| 1 July 2018 | GK | (England) | Sam Ramsbottom | Alfreton Town | Released | |
| 1 July 2018 | DM | (Jamaica) | Courtney Richards | Nuneaton Borough | Released | |
| 1 July 2018 | CB | (England) | Josh Thompson | Free agent | Released | |
| 1 July 2018 | CM | (England) | Danny Whitehead | Salford City | Free transfer | |
| 20 November 2018 | GK | (England) | Luke Simpson | Tamworth | Released | |
| 21 December 2018 | CF | (England) | Nathan Blissett | Solihull Moors | Undisclosed | |

=== Loans in ===
| Start date | Position | Nationality | Name | From | End date | Ref. |
|---|---|---|---|---|---|---|
| 1 July 2018 | CB | (Republic of Ireland) | Fiacre Kelleher | Oxford United | 31 May 2019 | |
| 30 July 2018 | CM | (England) | Callum Maycock | Coventry City | 31 May 2019 | |
| 3 August 2018 | AM | (England) | Malachi Napa | Oxford United | 1 January 2019 | |
| 15 August 2018 | GK | (Republic of Ireland) | Kieran O'Hara | Manchester United | 31 May 2019 | |
| 31 August 2018 | CF | (England) | Jordan Ponticelli | Coventry City | 10 January 2019 | |
| 18 January 2019 | CM | (England) | Reece Cole | Brentford | 31 May 2019 | |
| 31 January 2019 | CF | (Scotland) | Botti Biabi | (Wales) Swansea City | 31 May 2019 | |

=== Loans out ===
| Start date | Position | Nationality | Name | To | End date | Ref. |
|---|---|---|---|---|---|---|
| 2 March 2019 | RW | (England) | Adam Dawson | AFC Telford United | 31 May 2019 | |
