= Ben Stephens (footballer) =

English footballer

Personal information
- Full name: Ben Stephens
- Date of birth: 9 August 1997 (age 29)
- Place of birth: Leicester, England
- Height: 1.73 m (5 ft 8 in)
- Position: Forward

Team information
- Current team: Harborough Town

Youth career
- Leicester City

Senior career*
Years	Team	Apps	(Gls)
2015–2016	Oadby Town		
2016–2017	Kettering Town	29	(3)
2017–2018	Stratford Town	62	(22)
2018–2020	Macclesfield Town	45	(4)
2020	Macclesfield Town	0	(0)
2020–2021	Kettering Town	8	(1)
2021	Stratford Town	0	(0)
2021–2022	Barwell	33	(24)
2022–2024	King's Lynn Town	74	(15)
2024–	Harborough Town	0	(0)
- * Club domestic league appearances and goals as of 17:00, 1 July 2024 (UTC)

Ben Stephens (born 9 August 1997) is an English footballer who plays for National League North club Harborough Town, as a forward.

== Career ==
=== Early career ===
Stephens played youth football for Leicester City, and in non-league football with Oadby Town and Kettering Town.

=== Stratford Town ===
Stephens signed for Kettering's Southern League Premier Division rivals Stratford Town in November 2016, and made his debut for the club on 22 November 2016, in a league match at home to Slough Town, appearing as a substitute in a 2–1 defeat.

He scored his first goal for Stratford Town on 3 December 2016, in a league match away at Banbury United, with the club losing 2–1.

During his time at the club, Stephens trialled with a number of league clubs, including Coventry City, Ipswich Town and Birmingham City.

=== Macclesfield Town ===
In May 2018 he spent time with the V9 Academy, before turning professional in June 2018 after signing for Macclesfield Town.

Ben made his EFL League Two debut for Macclesfield Town on 12 October 2018, in an away fixture against Tranmere Rovers, coming on as 86th-minute substitute for Tyrone Marsh. Tranmere won the game 1–0. Stephens scored his first goal in the EFL League Two on 3 November 2018, in a 4–1 defeat at home to Bury.

Stephens was released by Macclesfield at the end of the 2019–20 season. He re-signed for the club on 15 September 2020. A day later he was released by the club following their winding up at the High Court.

=== Kettering Town ===
He returned to Kettering Town in October 2020.

=== Stratford Town ===
Stephens made his return to Stratford Town on 23 July 2021.

=== Barwell ===
Stephens signed for Southern League Premier Central rivals Barwell in August 2021. He made his debut for Barwell on 14 August 2021, in an away fixture against Lowestoft Town, scoring 2 goals in a 3–0 victory.

Stephens finished the season making 33 appearances in the Southern League Premier Central, and scoring 24 goals, which actually made the player the top goalscorer in the league for the 2021–22 season.

=== King's Lynn Town ===
Following Stephens' impressive 2021–22 season, he made the step up to join National League North club King's Lynn Town in July 2022 following a successful trial.

=== Harborough Town ===
On 9 July 2024, Stephens signed for newly promoted Southern League Premier Central side Harborough Town.

== Career statistics ==
As of match played 23 April 2022

Appearances and goals by club, season and competition
Club	Season	League			National Cup		League Cup		Other		Total	
Club	Season	Division	Apps	Goals	Apps	Goals	Apps	Goals	Apps	Goals	Apps	Goals
Kettering Town	2015–16	Southern League Premier Division	20	3	0	0	—		2 (Note: Two appearances in Northamptonshire Senior Cup)	0	22	3
Kettering Town	2016–17	Southern League Premier Division	9	0	0	0	—		2 (Note: One appearance in Northamptonshire Senior Cup) (Note: One appearance in FA Trophy)	0	11	0
Kettering Town	Total		29	3	0	0	0	0	4	0	33	3
Stratford Town	2016–17	Southern League Premier Division	23	2	0	0	—		2 (Note: One appearance in Birmingham Senior Cup) (Note: One appearance in Southern League Cup)	0	25	2
Stratford Town	2017–18	Southern League Premier Division	39	20	3	1	—		4 (Note: One appearance in Birmingham Senior Cup) (Note: One appearance in Southern League Cup) (Note: Two appearances in FA Trophy)	1 (Note: One goal in Southern League Cup)	46	22
Stratford Town	Total		62	22	3	1	0	0	6	1	71	24
Macclesfield Town	2018–19	EFL League Two	22	1	1	1	0	0	2 (Note: Appearances in the EFL Trophy.)	1	25	3
Macclesfield Town	2019–20	EFL League Two	23	3	0	0	1	0	3 (Note: Appearances in the EFL Trophy.)	0	27	3
Macclesfield Town	Total		45	4	1	0	1	0	5	1	52	6
Macclesfield Town	2020–21	National League	0	0	0	0	—		0	0	0	0
Kettering Town	2020–21	National League North	8	1	0	0	—		3 (Note: Appearances in the FA Trophy.)	0	11	1
Stratford Town	2021–22	Southern League Premier Division Central	0	0	0	0	—		0	0	0	0
Barwell	2021–22	Southern League Premier Division Central	33	24	1	0	—		0	0	34	24
Career total			177	54	5	2	1	0	18	2	201	58
