= Elliott Durrell =

English footballer (born 1989)

Personal information
- Full name: Elliott James Durrell
- Date of birth: 31 July 1989 (age 37)
- Place of birth: Shrewsbury, England
- Height: 5 ft 10 in (1.78 m)
- Position: Midfielder

Team information
- Current team: Stamford

Youth career
- Hednesford Town
- 200?–2007: AFC Telford United

Senior career*
Years	Team	Apps	(Gls)
2007–2008	AFC Telford United	3	(0)
2008	→ Rushall Olympic (loan)	2	(0)
2008–2014	Hednesford Town		
2011	→ Evesham United (loan)		
2014–2015	Wrexham	30	(4)
2015–2016	Tamworth	39	(13)
2016–2017	Chester	46	(8)
2017–2019	Macclesfield Town	52	(12)
2019–2020	York City	10	(1)
2020	Altrincham	4	(5)
2020–2021	Wrexham	26	(2)
2021–2022	AFC Telford United	14	(3)
2022–2023	Grantham Town	21	(1)
2023–2024	Gloucester City	32	(2)
2024–2025	Stourbridge	20	(3)
2025–	Stamford	1	(1)
- * Club domestic league appearances and goals as of 14:24, 16 March 2025 (UTC)

Elliott James Durrell (born 31 July 1989) is an English professional footballer who plays as a midfielder for Southern League Premier Division Central club Stamford.

He previously played non-league football for A.F.C. Telford United, Rushall Olympic, Hednesford Town, Evesham United, Wrexham, Tamworth, Chester, Macclesfield Town, York City, Altrincham, Wrexham and Grantham Town.

== Career ==
=== Early career ===
Durrell was born in Shrewsbury in 1989. He began his football career as a youngster with Hednesford Town, then moved on to AFC Telford United, for whom he made his senior debut in October 2007. After a spell on loan at Rushall Olympic in early 2008, he returned to Hednesford later that year. His time with the club was disrupted by injury, but once returned to fitness, a process that included a month's loan at Evesham United in 2011, his form improved to the extent that he was named Northern Premier League Premier Division Player of the Year for 2012–13. Durrell became a full-time professional with Conference National club Wrexham in January 2014.

=== Tamworth ===
Again, injury disrupted Durrell's time at Wrexham, and he was released at the end of the 2014–15 season. He then teamed up with Andy Morrell, his former manager at Wrexham, and joined National League North side Tamworth.

=== Chester ===
After one season, he moved on to Chester, where he was ever-present in the 2016–17 National League season before being released. In 2017 he also spent time with the V9 Academy.

=== Macclesfield Town ===
On 14 July 2017, Durrell signed for National League side Macclesfield Town on a two-year contract. He made 35 appearances as the team returned to the Football League as 2017–18 National League champions. He played in the FA Cup and EFL Trophy in November 2018, and finally, at the age of 29, made his first appearance in the Football League when he started in Macclesfield's League Two visit to MK Dons on 17 November. He played 70 minutes before being replaced by Koby Arthur as his team lost 2–0. His contract ended at the end of the season. He was one of a number of Macclesfield player who petitioned for the club's winding-up due to unpaid wages.

=== Return to non-league ===
He signed for York City in September 2019. He left the club in January 2020, signing for Altrincham in February 2020.

After helping Altrincham gain promotion from the National League North to the National League, Durell re-joined Wrexham for a second spell for the 2020–21 season on a one-year deal However, Durell left the club by mutual consent in April 2021. In June 2021, Durrell returned to AFC Telford United. On 6 January 2022, it was announced that Durrell was leaving the National League North side after only 14 league games on his return. Hours later it was announced that he had signed for Northern Premier League Premier Division side Grantham Town, re-uniting with former Bucks interim-manager, Dennis Greene.

In July 2023 he signed for Gloucester City.

On 8 August 2024, Durrell signed for Stourbridge. In March 2025, he joined Stamford.

== Honours ==
Macclesfield Town

- National League: 2017–18

Individual

- Northern Premier League Premier Division Player of the Year: 2012–13
- National League Team of the Year: 2017–18
