= Scott Wilson (footballer, born 1993) =

English association football player

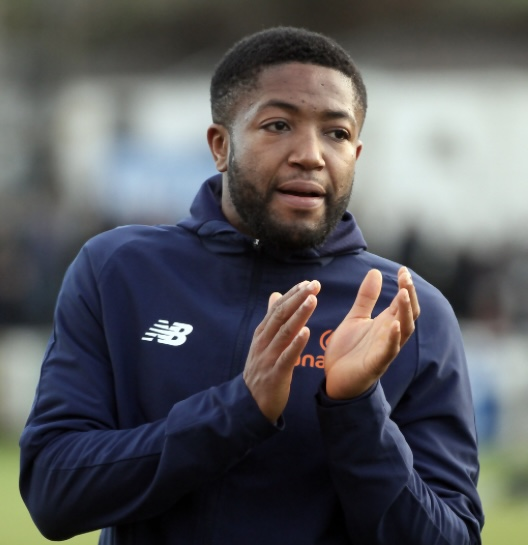

Personal information
- Full name: Scott Kristien Scott-Wilson
- Date of birth: 11 January 1993 (age 33)
- Place of birth: Bristol, England
- Height: 1.84 m (6 ft 0 in)
- Position: Winger

Team information
- Current team: Bath City
- Number: 9

Youth career
- 2010–2011: Bristol City

Senior career*
Years	Team	Apps	(Gls)
2010–2011	Bristol City	0	(0)
2011–2014	Gloucester City	36	(5)
2012–2013	→ Cinderford Town (dual-reg)		
2013	→ Yate Town (dual-reg)		
2014	Bath City	5	(0)
2014	Gloucester City	7	(1)
2014–2015	Paulton Rovers	34	(13)
2015–2016	Weston-super-Mare	34	(19)
2016–2017	Eastleigh	31	(4)
2017–2019	Macclesfield Town	68	(24)
2019–2020	Oldham Athletic	21	(2)
2020	→ Notts County (loan)	3	(0)
2020	Notts County	0	(0)
2020–2022	Dagenham & Redbridge	34	(2)
2022	→ Aldershot Town (loan)	2	(0)
2022–	Bath City	157	(54)
2025–2026	→ Weston-super-Mare (loan)	16	(2)
- * Club domestic league appearances and goals as of 13:28, 6 September 2026 (UTC)

Scott Kristien Scott-Wilson (born 11 January 1993), known as Scott Wilson, is an English professional footballer who plays as a striker for Southern League Premier Division South club Bath City.

== Career ==
Wilson started his career in the youth team of his hometown club, Bristol City, but never made a first team appearance. He left Bristol City following two loan spells away from the club.

Wilson joined Macclesfield in 2017 from National League side Eastleigh and signed a one-year deal at the club. On 9 December, he scored a hat-trick against fellow title challengers Wrexham to climb Macclesfield into first position of National League.

On 19 July 2019, he signed for League Two side Oldham Athletic on a free transfer, penning a one-year contract. He featured mainly as a substitute up until January as the Latics struggled towards the bottom end of the table. On 28 February 2020, he signed for National League side Notts County on loan until the end of the 2019–20 season.

On 1 July 2020, Wilson was released by Oldham Athletic.

On 7 July 2020, he signed a short-term contract with Notts County so that he could feature in the play-off games following the suspension in the league due to COVID-19. However, he didn't feature in any of the matches as County lost the play-off final to Harrogate Town, and he was subsequently released.

On 23 October 2020, Wilson joined National League side Dagenham & Redbridge on a free transfer.

On 29 January 2022, he joined fellow National League side Aldershot Town on an initial short-term loan.

On 19 July 2022, Wilson signed for National League South side Bath City.

== Career statistics ==
As of match played 5 September 2026

Appearances and goals by club, season and competition
Club	Season	League			FA Cup		EFL Cup		Other		Total	
Club	Season	Division	Apps	Goals	Apps	Goals	Apps	Goals	Apps	Goals	Apps	Goals
Gloucester City	2011–12	Conference North	9	0	—		—		1 (Note: Appearances in FA Trophy)	1	10	1
Gloucester City	2012–13	Conference North	3	0	0	0	—		0	0	3	0
Gloucester City	2013–14	Conference North	24	5	6	3	—		1	0	31	8
Gloucester City	Total		36	5	6	3	—		2	1	44	9
Bath City	2013–14	Conference South	5	0	—		—		2 (Note: Appearance(s) in Somerset Premier Cup)	2	7	2
Gloucester City	2014–15	Conference North	7	1	—		—		—		7	1
Paulton Rovers	2014–15	SL Premier Division	34	13	0	0	—		7 (Note: Two appearances and one goal in FA Trophy, three appearances in Southern League Cup, two appearances and one goal in Somerset Premier Cup)	2	41	15
Weston-super-Mare	2015–16	National League South	34	19	3	1	—		3	4	40	24
Eastleigh	2016–17	National League	31	4	6	2	—		0	0	37	6
Macclesfield Town	2017–18	National League	35	14	1	0	—		1	0	37	14
Macclesfield Town	2018–19	League Two	33	10	0	0	2	0	4 (Note: Appearances in EFL Trophy)	1	39	11
Macclesfield Town	Total		68	24	1	0	2	0	5	1	76	25
Oldham Athletic	2019–20	League Two	21	2	2	0	1	0	2	0	26	2
Notts County (loan)	2019–20	National League	3	0	—		—		1	1	4	1
Dagenham & Redbridge	2020–21	National League	26	1	3	2	—		1	1	30	4
Dagenham & Redbridge	2021–22	National League	7	1	1	0	—		0	0	8	1
Dagenham & Redbridge	Total		33	2	4	2	—		1	1	38	5
Aldershot Town (loan)	2021–22	National League	2	0	—		—		—		2	0
Bath City	2022–23	National League South	44	18	1	0	—		8 (Note: Three appearances and one goal in FA Trophy, five appearances and five goals in Somerset Premier Cup)	6	53	24
Bath City	2023–24	National League South	45	16	3	1	—		6 (Note: Three appearances and one goal in FA Trophy, two appearances and one goal in Somerset Premier Cup, one appearance in National League South play-offs)	2	54	19
Bath City	2024–25	National League South	39	10	2	0	—		2 (Note: One appearance in FA Trophy, one appearance in Somerset Premier Cup)	0	43	10
Bath City	2025–26	National League South	23	8	1	0	—		1	0	25	8
Bath City	2026–27	SL Premier Division South	6	2	1	0	—		0	0	7	2
Bath City	Total		157	54	8	1	—		17	8	182	63
Weston-super-Mare (loan)	2025–26	National League South	16	2	2	0	—		1	0	19	2
Career total			447	126	32	9	3	0	41	20	523	155

== Honours ==
Macclesfield Town

- National League: 2017–18

Individual

- National League South Player of the Month: August 2023
