= Tyrone Marsh =

English footballer (born 1993)

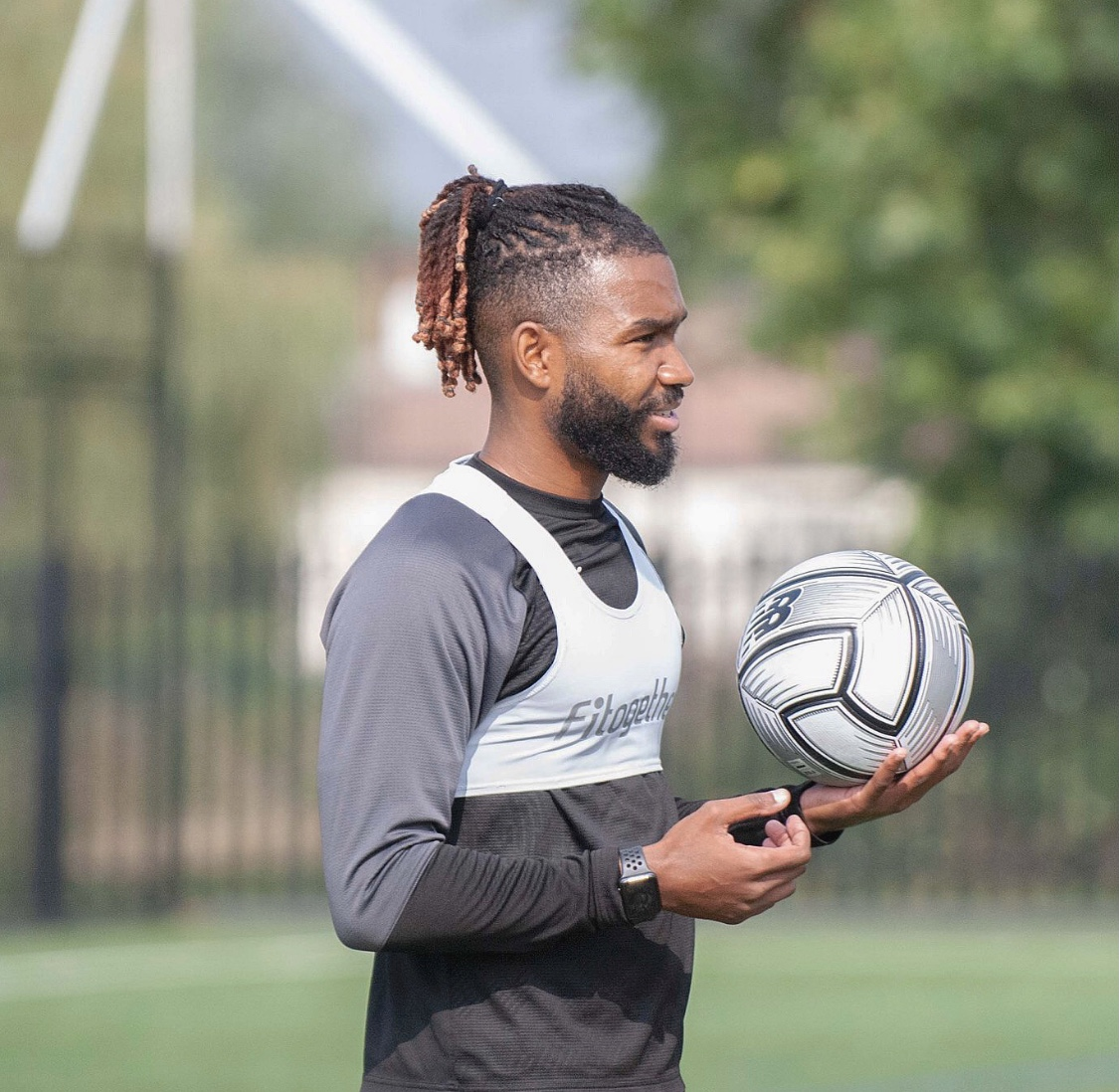
- Tyrone Marsh training at Boreham Wood

Personal information
- Full name: Tyrone Kallum Marsh
- Date of birth: 24 December 1993 (age 32)
- Place of birth: Bedford, England
- Position: Forward

Team information
- Current team: Oxford City

Youth career
- 2008–2012: Oxford United

Senior career*
Years	Team	Apps	(Gls)
2011–2014	Oxford United	7	(0)
2011–2012	→ Aylesbury (loan)	2	(3)
2013	→ Staines Town (loan)	14	(8)
2014	→ Welling United (loan)	20	(8)
2014–2015	Ebbsfleet United	14	(0)
2015–2016	Torquay United	18	(7)
2016–2017	Dover Athletic	16	(0)
2017	→ Welling United (loan)	6	(1)
2017–2019	Macclesfield Town	66	(11)
2019–2020	Boreham Wood	36	(14)
2020–2021	Stevenage	10	(0)
2021–2025	Boreham Wood	183	(32)
2025–2026	Bedford Town	41	(26)
2026–	Oxford City	0	(0)
- * Club domestic league appearances and goals as of 11:33, 24 May 2026 (UTC)

Tyrone Kallum Marsh (born 24 December 1993) is an English footballer who plays as a forward for National League North club Oxford City.

A product of the Oxford United academy, Marsh was sent out on loan to Aylesbury in order to gain first-team experience in December 2011. Ahead of the 2012–13 season, he signed his first professional contract with Oxford, and subsequently made his first-team debut in August 2012. During his time at Oxford, he spent time out on loan at Staines Town and Welling United respectively. Marsh signed with Ebbsfleet United in December 2014, spending the remainder of the 2013–14 season there.

A move to National League club Torquay United followed in June 2015, before then signing for divisional rivals Dover Athletic for an undisclosed fee in January 2016. Injury restricted Marsh's game-time at Dover and he rejoined Welling United on loan in April 2017. Marsh signed for Macclesfield Town in July 2017 following a successful trial. He helped the club win the National League title during the 2017–18 season. After a season back in the Football League with Macclesfield, Marsh signed for Boreham Wood of the National League in July 2019. A year later, he signed for League Two club Stevenage before rejoining Boreham Wood in February 2021. On the 18th June 2025 he signed for his hometown club Bedford Town F.C who had just been promoted to the National League North.

== Career ==
=== Oxford United ===
Marsh began his career in the youth academies at Milton Keynes Dons and Luton Town. He joined Oxford United's academy at the age of 14. Whilst still playing for Oxford's youth team, Marsh was sent on loan to Aylesbury in order to gain first-team experience in December 2011. He scored on his debut for Aylesbury in a 1–1 draw with Chalfont St Peter on 26 December 2011. Marsh made two appearances during the one-month loan agreement, scoring three goals. With his scholarship at Oxford coming to an end, Marsh signed his first professional contract with the club in the summer of 2012. He made his professional debut as an 81st-minute substitute in a 3–0 away defeat to Leeds United in the Football League Cup on 28 August 2012. Marsh then made his league debut in the club's 4–0 loss against Burton Albion on 15 September 2012; again as a late substitute. He made his home debut, and scored his first senior goal, for Oxford in the Football League Trophy area semi-final against Southend United on 8 January 2013. He scored once in six appearances during the 2012–13 season.

Having made seven appearances for Oxford during the first half of the 2013–14 season, Marsh was loaned out to Staines Town of the Conference South on 31 January 2013. The loan agreement was initially scheduled to run for the remainder of the season. He scored on his debut; the only goal of the game in a 1–0 away victory against Bath City on 2 February 2013. Marsh was a regular starter during his time at Staines, making 16 appearances and scoring nine times in all competitions. Marsh stated he had learned a lot from his time at Staines. He was subsequently recalled by his parent club on 25 April 2013, and went on to make one further appearance for Oxford's first-team upon his return that season.

Ahead of the 2014–15 season, Marsh joined Conference Premier club Welling United on loan until 24 December 2014. Welling manager Jamie Day stated he had tried to sign Marsh during the previous season and that he was looking forward to working with the player throughout the first half of the campaign. Marsh did not score in his first nine appearances for Welling, but a late goal in a 2–0 victory over Lincoln City on 16 September 2014 would ultimately serve as the catalyst for a run of nine goals in his last 14 appearances for the club. This included scoring twice in home victories against Nuneaton Town and Aldershot Town respectively, the latter was his last League match for the club. A day before his loan spell was due to conclude, on 23 December 2014, he scored in Welling's 3–2 FA Trophy defeat to Ebbsfleet United. He played 23 times in all competitions during the loan agreement, scoring nine times.

=== Non-League ===
Marsh signed an 18-month contract with Conference South club Ebbsfleet United on a free transfer on 24 December 2014. Having scored against them a day earlier for Welling, the move reunited him with manager Jamie Day; who had also made the move from Welling to Ebbsfleet earlier in the month. He made his Ebbsfleet debut in the club's 5–1 away victory at Chelmsford City on 26 December 2014. He made 14 appearances during the remainder of the season, scoring no goals during his time there.

He signed for National League club Torquay United on a one-year contract on 25 June 2015. In doing so, he became manager Paul Cox's first signing for the club alongside right-back James Hurst. Cox described Marsh as possessing "immense raw talent", stating he had watched him play a number of times and had seen him evolve as a player. He made his debut for the club in a 3–1 away loss to Wrexham on 11 August 2015. Marsh scored his first goals in Torquay's 7–3 defeat to Bromley at Plainmoor on 19 September 2015. Having scored in his two previous games under new manager Kevin Nicholson, Marsh added a third goal in as many games in the club's 1–1 away draw with Altrincham on 31 October 2015. However, he was sent-off in the second-half of the same match for pushing team-mate Dan Butler; with Nicholson stating Marsh needed to "grow up" after the incident. Marsh apologised for his actions and said it was "totally out of character and the first time I have been involved in an incident like this". He served his three-match suspension and returned to the starting line-up for the first time in a 4–1 victory over Forest Green Rovers on 26 December 2015, scoring twice. Marsh scored seven times in 21 appearances during his time at Torquay.

He joined fellow National League club Dover Athletic for an undisclosed fee, and on a 18-month contract, on 27 January 2016. He went on to make nine appearances for Dover, of which eight were as a substitute, during the second half of the season as they lost in the National League play-offs to Forest Green. A knee injury restricted Marsh to just ten appearances for the club during 2016–17 season. Recovering from the injury, Marsh joined former club Welling United on a one-month loan towards the end of the season. He made six appearances during the brief loan agreement, scoring once.

=== Macclesfield Town ===
Ahead of the 2017–18 season, Marsh spent time on trial with National League club Macclesfield Town. He played in a pre-season friendly against Derby County on 15 July 2017 and subsequently signed a one-year contract with the club on the same day. He made his competitive debut for Macclesfield on the opening day of the season, playing the first 84 minutes in a 1–0 away victory against Wrexham. Marsh scored his first goal for the club in their 1–0 win against former club Dover Athletic on 25 August 2017; his second-half header gave Macclesfield their first home victory of the campaign. He ended the season by scoring five times in the club's last seven matches, including in their 2–0 away victory at Eastleigh; the game in which they secured promotion back into the Football League after finishing the season as National League champions. Marsh made 44 appearances in all competitions during the season, scoring ten goals.

Having appeared regularly for the club throughout the previous season, Marsh signed a new two-year contract with Macclesfield on 8 June 2018. He started in the club's first match back in League Two, playing the first 82 minutes in a 3–2 away defeat to Swindon Town on 4 August 2018. Marsh scored his first goal of the 2018–19 season in the reverse fixture against Swindon on 5 January 2019; giving Macclesfield an early lead in an eventual 2–1 loss. He made 29 appearances during the season, scoring twice.

=== Boreham Wood ===
Despite having one year remaining on his contract at Macclesfield, Marsh dropped down a league in order to sign for National League club Boreham Wood on a one-year deal. He scored on his debut against former club Torquay United on 3 August 2019; his injury-time goal was not enough to prevent a 2–1 defeat. A goal in a defeat to another one of his former clubs, Ebbsfleet United, on 26 August 2019, was to represent the start of a goal-scoring run for Marsh as he went on to score eight goals in the club's next ten games. He scored 15 times in 40 appearances during the 2019–20 season as Boreham Wood lost in the play-off semi-final to eventual winners Harrogate Town.

=== Stevenage ===
Marsh signed for League Two club Stevenage on a free transfer on 31 July 2020. He made his Stevenage debut in the club's 3–3 draw with Portsmouth in the EFL Cup on 29 August 2020, playing the first 53 minutes of the match. Marsh scored his first goal for Stevenage in the club's 2–1 EFL Trophy victory over Southampton U21s on 22 September 2020.

=== Return to Boreham Wood ===
Marsh rejoined National League club Boreham Wood on an 18-month contract, for an undisclosed fee, on 4 February 2021.

=== Bedford Town ===
In June 2025, Marsh joined hometown club Bedford Town following their promotion to the National League North. He was named in the Team of the Season for the 2025–26 season having scored twenty-five goals in his first campaign with the club.

=== Oxford City ===
On 22 May 2026, Marsh joined fellow National League North club Oxford City.

== Career statistics ==
As of end of 2025–26 season

Appearances and goals by club, season and competition
Club	Season	League			FA Cup		League Cup		Other		Total	
Club	Season	Division	Apps	Goals	Apps	Goals	Apps	Goals	Apps	Goals	Apps	Goals
Oxford United	2012–13	League Two	2	0	0	0	1	0	3 (Note: Appearance(s) in EFL Trophy)	1	6	1
Oxford United	2013–14	League Two	5	0	3	0	0	0	0	0	8	0
Oxford United	Total		7	0	3	0	1	0	3	1	14	1
Aylesbury (loan)	2011–12	SFL Division One Central	2	3	0	0	—		0	0	2	3
Staines Town (loan)	2012–13	Conference South	14	8	0	0	—		2 (Note: Appearances and goal in Middlesex Senior Cup)	1	16	9
Welling United (loan)	2014–15	Conference Premier	20	8	1	0	—		2 (Note: Appearance(s) in FA Trophy)	1	23	9
Ebbsfleet United	2014–15	Conference South	14	0	0	0	—		0	0	14	0
Torquay United	2015–16	National League	18	7	1	0	—		2	0	21	7
Dover Athletic	2015–16	National League	8	0	0	0	—		1 (Note: Appearance(s) in National League play-offs)	0	9	0
Dover Athletic	2016–17	National League	8	0	1	0	—		1	0	10	0
Dover Athletic	Total		16	0	1	0	—		2	0	19	0
Welling United (loan)	2016–17	National League South	6	1	0	0	—		0	0	6	1
Macclesfield Town	2017–18	National League	41	9	2	1	—		1	0	44	10
Macclesfield Town	2018–19	League Two	25	2	0	0	3	0	1	0	29	2
Macclesfield Town	Total		66	11	2	1	3	0	2	0	73	12
Boreham Wood	2019–20	National League	36	14	1	1	—		3 (Note: One appearance in the FA Trophy, two appearances in the National League play-offs)	0	40	15
Stevenage	2020–21	League Two	10	0	1	0	1	0	2	1	14	1
Boreham Wood	2020–21	National League	23	5	0	0	—		0	0	23	5
Boreham Wood	2021-22	National League	44	10	5	1	—		3	4	52	15
Boreham Wood	2022-23	National League	39	9	4	0	—		3 (Note: One appearance in FA Trophy, two appearances in National League play-offs)	0	46	9
Boreham Wood	2023-24	National League	44	6	1	0	—		1	0	46	6
Boreham Wood	2024–25	National League South	33	2	4	1	—		5 (Note: Four appearances and one goal in FA Trophy, one appearance in National League South play-offs)	1	42	4
Boreham Wood	Total		183	32	14	2	0	0	12	5	209	39
Bedford Town	2025–26	National League North	41	26	2	0	—		1	0	44	26
Career total			435	100	26	4	5	0	29	9	495	123

== Honours ==
Macclesfield Town

- National League: 2017–18

Boreham Wood

- National League South play-offs: 2025

Individual

- National League North Team of the Season: 2025–26
