= V9 Academy =

Football academy

V9 Academy is an English football academy co-founded by Jamie Vardy with the intention of gaining non-League players contracts at professional clubs.

== History ==
The V9 Academy was founded, in 2016, by professional player Jamie Vardy and his agent John Morris after they felt that "too few professional clubs look hard enough in non-league football". Vardy invested £100,000 into the venture. Vardy had played in non-league football for a number of years before turning professional, eventually winning the Premier League with Leicester City and representing England at international level.

For the first intake in 2017 there were thousands of applicants. In the summer of 2017 the academy invited 42 applicants to attend a week-long trial in Manchester, from which four players (Danny Newton, Alex Penny, Lamar Reynolds and Blair Turgott) received professional contracts. There were scouts present from 65 professional clubs. It was the subject of a Sky Sports documentary series in September 2017.

There was a second intake of 42 players in June 2018, which was also the subject of a Sky Sports documentary.

== Graduates ==
Danny Newton was the first graduate who was awarded a professional contract after signing for Stevenage in June 2017. Three further players – Alex Penny, Lamar Reynolds and Blair Turgott – also received professional contracts that summer. Other players from that initial intake also later received professional contracts, including Elliott Durrell, Mikel Miller, and Elton Ngwatala.

There was a second intake of players in 2018, the first of which was Luther Wildin. In June 2018 two more graduates – Josh Heaton and Cody Cooke – were awarded professional contracts by Scottish club St Mirren. Later that month Ben Stephens and Andy Dales, both graduates of the 2018 intake, signed for Football League teams.

The most notable graduate of the V9 Academy is Sam McCallum who joined then-Premier League outfit Norwich City in January 2020 for a reported fee of £3,500,000 from Coventry City after breaking into the Coventry first team and making a total of 35 appearances and scoring three goals over two seasons with Coventry. McCallum has since spent another loan spell back with Coventry in the Championship, and also Queens Park Rangers.
