= Koby Arthur =

Ghanaian professional footballer

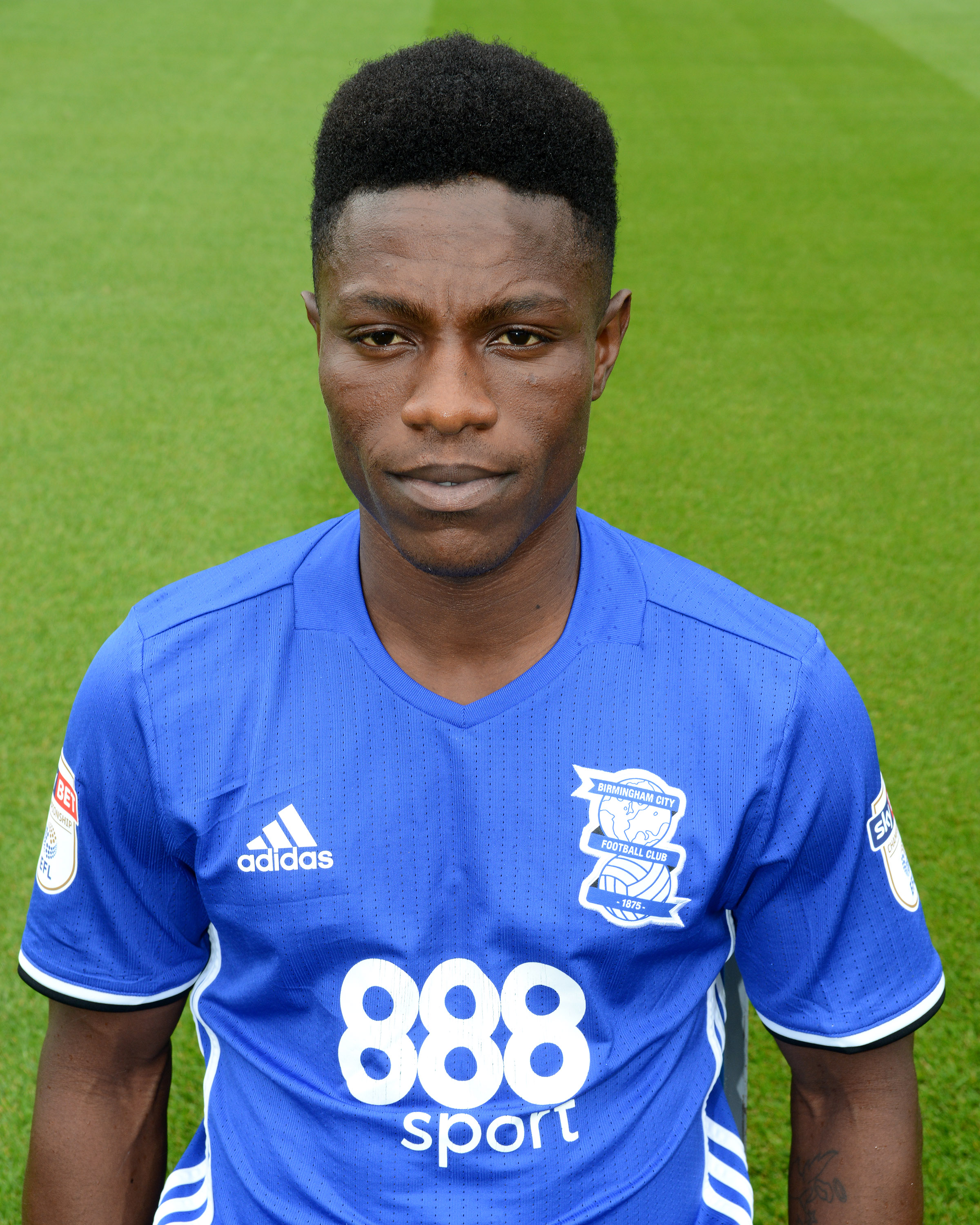
- Arthur with Birmingham City in 2016

Personal information
- Full name: Koby Owusu Arthur
- Date of birth: 31 January 1996 (age 30)
- Place of birth: Kumasi, Ghana
- Height: 5 ft 6 in (1.68 m)
- Position: Midfielder

Team information
- Current team: Rushall Olympic

Youth career
- 2012: Woodford United
- 2012–2013: Birmingham City

Senior career*
Years	Team	Apps	(Gls)
2013–2017	Birmingham City	12	(0)
2014	→ Lincoln City (loan)	6	(0)
2014	→ Cheltenham Town (loan)	7	(3)
2016–2017	→ Cheltenham Town (loan)	5	(0)
2017–2019	Macclesfield Town	34	(4)
2020–2021	Kidderminster Harriers	11	(1)
2021–2022	Dover Athletic	32	(5)
2022–2023	Maidenhead United	18	(1)
2023–2024	Hereford	15	(0)
2024	Stourbridge	13	(1)
2024–	Rushall Olympic	4	(0)
2024–2025	→ Barwell (dual registration)	26	(0)
- * Club domestic league appearances and goals as of 09:43, 30 April 2025 (UTC)

Koby Owusu Arthur (born 31 January 1996) is a Ghanaian footballer who plays as a midfielder for Southern League Premier Division Central club Rushall Olympic.

A midfielder who can also play as a forward, Arthur made his Football League debut in the Championship with Birmingham City in April 2013. He spent time on loan at Conference Premier club Lincoln City and in two spells with League Two club Cheltenham Town, for whom he scored his first senior goal. After his release from Birmingham in 2017, Arthur joined Macclesfield Town, and was part of the squad that won the 2017–18 National League title and promotion back to the Football League. After time out of the game through injury, Arthur had a truncated season with Kidderminster Harriers of the National League North and spent the 2021–22 season with Dover Athletic before joining another National League club, Maidenhead United, in 2022. He went on to play for Hereford, Stourbridge and (briefly) Rushall Olympic before joining Barwell on dual registration in September 2024.

== Early life and career ==
Arthur was born in Kumasi, Ghana. After moving to England he joined the youth system of Southern League club Woodford United, where he was noticed by a Birmingham City scout in 2012. The 16-year-old Arthur moved into the football and education development programme run by Birmingham City's community department, and was soon recruited into the club's main development system. He played for the club's under-18 team, and made his reserve team debut in February 2013 in a 2–1 Birmingham Senior Cup defeat to Stourbridge. Development squad coach Richard Beale described his performance as excellent: "He won his headers and tackles and he got the ball down and tried to pass it and he can be very pleased with the way he played." A few days later, he produced another good performance on his first Professional Development League appearance.

Arthur is short in stature, at 5 ft 6 in (1.68 m), but solidly built. Manager Lee Clark described him as a "pocket battleship", who plays at a high tempo with "so much energy and enthusiasm". According to his profile on the Birmingham City website, he is "a powerful striker of the ball", able to play in any midfield position or as a forward.

== Club career ==
=== Birmingham City ===
Arthur was given squad number 16 ahead of the visit of Sheffield Wednesday on 19 February 2013, but did not make the 18-man matchday squad, and was included in the travelling party for the next match, away at Peterborough United. Amid tabloid reports of interest from Premier League clubs, Arthur signed a two-year professional contract with Birmingham. He made his first-team debut on 1 April in a 3–2 defeat at home to Wolverhampton Wanderers in the Championship, coming on as a 78th-minute substitute for Mitch Hancox. According to the Birmingham Mail's match report, "he was nimble, showed the odd glimpse". He made his second and last appearance of the season, also as a late substitute, in Birmingham's next match. At the end-of-season awards ceremony, Arthur was honoured as Academy Player of the Season.

He made his first competitive start on 6 August 2013, as Birmingham beat Plymouth Argyle 3–2 after extra time in the first round of the League Cup, and his first league appearance of the season a few days later, as a second-half substitute in a home defeat to Brighton & Hove Albion.

=== Loans ===
On 21 March 2014, Arthur became the third Birmingham youngster, after Charlee Adams and Nick Townsend, to join Conference Premier club Lincoln City on a youth loan until the end of the season. He went straight into the starting eleven for the following day's match at Gateshead, but was replaced at half-time with his side two goals behind. He made five more appearances before returning to Birmingham.

Arthur joined League Two side Cheltenham Town on 25 July 2014 on a six-month youth loan. On his second appearance, he scored his first senior goal: in the 84th minute, he latched on to a long goalkeeping clearance and "showed his strength to hold off Jordan Mustoe and bundle it past Simpson into the net" to put Cheltenham 2–1 up, which proved to be a winning lead after Accrington Stanley's Kal Naismith missed a late penalty. He scored again a week later as Cheltenham came back from 2–0 down to win at Tranmere Rovers, and further enhanced his "super-sub" reputation with a 90th-minute header in the next match to secure a 1–0 win against Hartlepool United that took Cheltenham top of the table. Given his first start in the Football League Trophy, he scored Cheltenham's second goal, again with a header, to ensure their progress to the second round at Oxford United's expense. He made his first league start on 13 September, in a 1–0 defeat away to Luton Town, and was recalled by Birmingham the following day.

=== Return to Birmingham ===
A hamstring injury prevented any immediate involvement with the team, but after what assistant manager Steve Watson described as a breathtaking training session, and with Demarai Gray unavailable through injury, Arthur made his full League debut for Birmingham on 30 September 2014 in a 3–1 win at Millwall, the club's first away win of the season. He missed out on a debut goal in the next match, away to Charlton Athletic, when his attempt was disallowed for offside against Clayton Donaldson. After Gary Rowett took over as manager, Arthur had a brief run in the side, and was given a new two-year contract at the end of the 2014–15 season, but he never broke through to the first team; his last league appearance for the club came on 6 December 2014, in a 1–0 defeat away to Blackpool.

Arthur returned to Cheltenham Town on 19 August 2016 on loan until 2 January 2017. His progress was disrupted by injury, and he returned to Birmingham having made just seven appearances. He was released when his contract expired at the end of the season.

=== Macclesfield Town ===
After trials with National League clubs Solihull Moors and Macclesfield Town, Arthur signed a one-year contract with Macclesfield on 1 August 2017. He linked up again with assistant manager Steve Watson, his former coach at Birmingham. Arthur made his debut as a late substitute in a 1–1 draw at home to Hartlepool United on 8 August. He made 14 league appearances and scored once, in a 4–1 defeat at home to Maidstone United, as Macclesfield went on to win the National League title and promotion back to the Football League. Although he was not initially included on Macclesfield's retained list, he signed a one-year deal to extend his stay with the club. On the opening day of the 2018–19 season, Arthur scored twice at home to Swindon Town, but his team lost 3–2. He made 25 appearances in all competitions, but was not offered a new contract at the end of the season.

=== Kidderminster Harriers ===
Arthur had hopes of remaining in the Football League with Walsall, but an Achilles injury in a pre-season friendly was to keep him out of football for some time. He began training with National League North club Kidderminster Harriers in the early months of 2020, and the club registered him to play in reserve-team matches. At the end of May, he signed for Kidderminster for the 2020–21 season. He made 11 league appearances before the season ended early because of issues surrounding the COVID-19 pandemic, and was released when his contract expired.

=== Dover Athletic ===
After featuring for the club in pre-season, Arthur signed for Dover Athletic of the National League in August 2021. His first goal for the club opened the scoring in a 3–2 away to Altrincham on 4 September. On 15 April 2022, Arthur scored his fifth goal of the season which proved to be the winner as Dover got only their second win of the season against Boreham Wood, taking their points tally up to zero after their twelve-point deduction prior to the season. Arthur was not retained by the club following relegation.

=== Maidenhead United ===
On 28 May 2022, Arthur joined National League club Maidenhead United. After one goal in 22 appearances, he was released at the end of the season.

=== Later career ===
Arthur signed for National League North club Hereford on 13 July 2023 after a trial period, reuniting with former Birmingham City teammate, now manager of Hereford, Paul Caddis. He made his debut as a substitute in the opening home league fixture of the season, and made his full debut in the fifth league fixture of the season.

In January 2024, he joined Southern Football League Premier Division Central club Stourbridge on a dual-registration basis. He was released by Hereford on 30 January 2024, and continued playing for Stourbridge until the end of the season.

Arthur joined National League North club Rushall Olympic on 30 July 2024 following a successful trial period. He played only once before moving on to Barwell of the Southern League Premier Central on dual registration in September 2024. He returned to Rushall Olympic near the end of the season.

== Career statistics ==
As of end of 2024–25 season

Appearances and goals by club, season and competition
Club	Season	League			FA Cup		League Cup		Other		Total	
Club	Season	Division	Apps	Goals	Apps	Goals	Apps	Goals	Apps	Goals	Apps	Goals
Birmingham City	2012–13	Championship	2	0	—		—		—		2	0
Birmingham City	2013–14	Championship	1	0	0	0	1	0	—		2	0
Birmingham City	2014–15	Championship	9	0	1	0	0	0	—		10	0
Birmingham City	2015–16	Championship	0	0	0	0	2	0	—		2	0
Birmingham City	2016–17	Championship	0	0	0	0	0	0	—		0	0
Birmingham City	Total		12	0	1	0	3	0	0	0	16	0
Lincoln City (loan)	2013–14	Conference Premier	6	0	—		—		—		6	0
Cheltenham Town (loan)	2014–15	League Two	7	3	0	0	0	0	1 (Note: Appearance in Football League Trophy)	1	8	4
Cheltenham Town (loan)	2016–17	League Two	5	0	0	0	1	0	1 (Note: Appearance(s) in EFL Trophy)	0	7	0
Cheltenham Town (loan)	Total		12	3	0	0	1	0	2	1	15	4
Macclesfield Town	2017–18	National League	14	1	2	1	—		1 (Note: Appearance(s) in FA Trophy)	0	17	2
Macclesfield Town	2018–19	League Two	20	3	0	0	2	0	3	1	25	4
Macclesfield Town	Total		34	4	2	1	2	0	4	1	42	6
Kidderminster Harriers	2020–21	National League North	11	1	0	0	—		1	0	12	1
Dover Athletic	2021–22	National League	32	5	1	0	—		1	0	34	5
Maidenhead United	2022–23	National League	18	1	2	0	—		2	0	22	1
Hereford	2023–24	National League North	15	0	3	0	—		2	1	20	1
Stourbridge	2023–24	Southern League; Premier Division Central	13	1	—		—		—		13	1
Rushall Olympic	2024–25	National League North	4	0	—		—		—		4	0
Barwell	2024–25	SFL Premier Division Central	26	0	2	0	—		1	0	29	0
Career total			183	15	11	1	6	0	13	3	213	19

== Honours ==
Macclesfield Town

- National League: 2017–18

Individual

- Birmingham City Academy Player of the Season: 2012–13
