= Blair Turgott =

Jamaican footballer (born 1994)

Personal information
- Full name: Blair Sebastian Turgott
- Date of birth: 22 May 1994 (age 32)
- Place of birth: Bromley, England
- Height: 1.83 m (6 ft 0 in)
- Position: Winger

Team information
- Current team: Chania
- Number: 7

Youth career
- 2002–2012: West Ham United

Senior career*
Years	Team	Apps	(Gls)
2012–2015	West Ham United	0	(0)
2012–2013	→ Bradford City (loan)	4	(0)
2013	→ Colchester United (loan)	4	(1)
2014	→ Rotherham United (loan)	1	(0)
2014	→ Dagenham & Redbridge (loan)	5	(0)
2015	Coventry City	3	(1)
2015–2016	Leyton Orient	31	(1)
2016–2017	Bromley	43	(12)
2017	Stevenage	0	(0)
2017	→ Boreham Wood (loan)	9	(2)
2017–2018	Boreham Wood	4	(0)
2018	→ Maidstone United (loan)	3	(1)
2018–2019	Maidstone United	43	(17)
2019–2021	Östersund	63	(18)
2022–2024	BK Häcken	28	(2)
2024–2026	Halmstad	26	(1)
2026–	Chania	9	(1)

International career^{‡}
2009–2010	England U16	6	(3)
2010–2011	England U17	14	(4)
2011	England U18	1	(0)
2012–2013	England U19	6	(3)
2016	England C	1	(0)
2021	Jamaica	6	(0)
- * Club domestic league appearances and goals as of 21 April 2026 ‡ National team caps and goals as of 20:47, 26 July 2021 (UTC)

Blair Sebastian Turgott (born 22 May 1994) is a professional footballer who plays as a winger for Chania. He has previously played for West Ham United and Coventry City and has had loan spells with Bradford City, Colchester United, Rotherham United and Dagenham & Redbridge. Born in England, he represents the Jamaica national team.

== Career ==
=== West Ham United ===
Turgott joined West Ham United aged 8 becoming a youth and development squad player. He made his West Ham debut on 5 January 2014 in a 5–0 FA Cup defeat by Nottingham Forest. This was his only appearance for West Ham before being released in 2015.

==== Loan spells ====
He moved on loan from West Ham United to Bradford City in November 2012, and made his professional debut in the FA Cup in a 1–1 draw against Brentford on 30 November 2012. Turgott stated in December 2012 that he hoped the loan move would toughen him up. On 4 March 2013, he returned to West Ham after his loan spell ended, having made 11 appearances for the club.

Turgott signed an initial one-month loan deal with Colchester United on 28 November 2013. Turgott made his Colchester United debut on 14 December 2013, coming on as a half time substitute in a 4–0 home defeat by Notts County. He scored his first club career goal on 26 December 2013, the opener in a 4–0 home win over Stevenage. Turgott returned to West Ham at the end of his loan having played four times and scoring once for Colchester.

On 17 January 2014, Turgott joined Rotherham United on an initial one-month loan. He made his Rotherham debut a day later in a 3–0 away win against Shrewsbury Town coming on as an 88th-minute substitute for Ben Pringle. This was his only appearance for Rotherham before he was recalled by West Ham in February 2014.

On 27 March 2014, Turgott joined League Two side Dagenham & Redbridge on loan for the remainder of the 2013–14 season. Turgott made his Dagenham & Redbridge two days after signing for the club, making his first start for them, in a 1–0 win over Oxford United. Turgott went on to make five appearances for the club.

=== Coventry City ===
Having been released from his contract by West Ham United, on 2 February 2015, Turgott signed for Coventry City on a short-term deal.

Turgott made his Coventry City debut on 3 March 2015, coming on as a substitute for Adam Barton in the second half, in a 1–0 loss against Barnsley. Turgott scored his only Coventry goal on 28 March in a 0–1 away win against Peterborough United following-up a shot from Sanmi Odelusi. He was released by Coventry at the end of the 2014–15 season.

=== Leyton Orient ===
Turgott joined League Two club Leyton Orient on a one-year contract on 19 June 2015. He made his debut as a substitute on the opening day of the season, coming on for Jay Simpson in the 2–0 home win over Barnet, and scored his first goal for the club in the 3–0 win over Stevenage on 18 August. His opening goal for Leyton Orient was described as a "stunning goal" by their manager, Ian Hendon. Meeting a right-wing cross from Sean Clohessy, Turgott hit a first-time volley from 18 yards (16 m) past the Stevenage goalkeeper, Chris Day. In May 2016, he was released from Leyton Orient when it was announced that he would not be retained when his contract expired.

=== Bromley ===
On 4 August 2016, after a successful pre-season in which he had scored four goals, it was announced that Turgott had signed for hometown club Bromley.

=== Stevenage and Boreham Wood ===
After attending the V9 Academy, on 27 June 2017, Turgott joined League Two side Stevenage. After a single appearance for the Boro, as a second-half substitute in an EFL Cup loss at Millwall, he was loaned to Boreham Wood on 8 September 2017. He played the full 90 minutes against former club Leyton Orient the following day. On 21 December 2017, Stevenage announced that Turgott's contract had been terminated, following which he returned to Boreham Wood on a permanent deal.

=== Maidstone United ===
After Turgott scored during a short three-match loan spell at Maidstone, the Stones signed him for the 2018 - 19 season. Turgott went on to score 17 goals in 43 appearances, his most prolific period as a striker so far in his career.

=== Sweden ===
In July 2019, Turgott left England and signed with Allsvenskan side Östersund.

It wasn't until on 10 August 2019 when he made his debut for the club against GIF Sundsvall, coming on as a 43rd-minute substitute and won the penalty, which teammate Dino Islamović successfully converted the penalty, in a 1–1 draw. Two weeks later on 25 August 2019, Turgott scored his first goal for Östersunds FK, in a 3–1 loss against AIK. At the end of the 2019 season, he went on to make sixteen appearances and scoring once in all competitions.

At the start of the 2021 season, Turgott helped Östersund when he scored three times in the Svenska Cupen's group stage matches, including a brace against Landskrona BoIS and saw the club reach through the group stage. Turgott scored his first hat–trick of his Östersund's career, in a 5–0 win against Örebro SK on 18 April 2021. He then scored his second hat–trick of his Östersund's career, in a 3–1 win against IF Elfsborg on 19 September 2021. However, he was unable to help the club avoid relegation after they lost 3–0 against Varbergs BoIS. Despite this, Turgott finished as Östersund's top–scorer with thirteen goals in a total of twenty–nine appearances in the 2021 season.

On 5 May 2022, Turgott joined Allsvenskan side BK Häcken on a two-year deal. He won the 2022 Allsvenskan in his first season with BK Häcken, scoring in the title deciding match against IFK Goteborg in October 2022.

On 20 June 2024, Turgott signed for fellow Allsvenskan side Halmstad on a two-and-a-half-year deal. On 1 February 2026, he left the club by mutual consent. Two days later, he joined Super League Greece 2 side Chania.

== International career ==
He has represented England up to under-19 level. He scored in the 2011 FIFA U-17 World Cup against Canada and helped England to top their group. He scored his first goal at under-19 level during 2013 UEFA European Under-19 Football Championship qualification in a 3–0 win against Estonia. He also scored twice in the 6–0 win against Faroe Islands, helping England finish top of their qualification group which also contained Ukraine.

Turgott was called up to represent the Jamaica national team for a pair of friendlies in June 2021. On 7 June 2021, he made his senior international debut for Jamaica in a 1–1 draw against Serbia.

== Personal life ==
In April 2017, Turgott was charged with offences relating to fraud and money laundering. He was subsequently cleared of a charge of converting criminal property, while a jury failed to reach a verdict on the other charge of fraud.

== Career statistics ==
=== Club ===
As of match played 30 October 2021

Appearances and goals by club, season and competition
Club	Season	League			FA Cup		League Cup		Other		Total	
Club	Season	Division	Apps	Goals	Apps	Goals	Apps	Goals	Apps	Goals	Apps	Goals
Bradford City (loan)	2012–13	League Two	4	0	2	0	3	0	2 (Note: Appearances in Football League Trophy)	0	11	0
West Ham United	2013–14	Premier League	0	0	1	0	0	0	—		1	0
Colchester United (loan)	2013–14	League One	4	1	—		—		—		4	1
Rotherham United (loan)	2013–14	League One	1	0	—		—		—		1	0
Dagenham & Redbridge (loan)	2013–14	League Two	5	0	—		—		—		5	0
Coventry City	2014–15	League One	3	1	—		—		—		3	1
Leyton Orient	2015–16	League Two	31	1	3	0	1	0	1	0	36	1
Bromley	2016–17	National League	43	12	1	1	—		3 (Note: Appearances in FA Trophy)	2	47	15
Stevenage	2017–18	League Two	0	0	0	0	1	0	0	0	1	0
Boreham Wood (loan)	2017–18	National League	9	2	3	1	—		0	0	12	3
Boreham Wood	2017–18	National League	4	0	—		—		1	0	5	0
Maidstone United (loan)	2017–18	National League	3	1	—		—		—		3	1
Maidstone United	2017–18	National League	11	2	—		—		—		11	2
Maidstone United	2018–19	National League	31	14	2	2	—		—		33	16
Östersunds FK	2019	Allsvenskan	12	1	4	0	—		—		16	1
Östersunds FK	2020	Allsvenskan	27	7	1	0	—		—		28	7
Östersunds FK	2021	Allsvenskan	20	10	5	3	—		—		25	13
BK Häcken	2022	Allsvenskan	23	2	1	0	—		—		24	2
BK Häcken	2023	Allsvenskan	—		3	0	—		—		3	0
BK Häcken	2024	Allsvenskan	5	0	0	0	—		—		5	0
Halmstads BK	2024	Allsvenskan	15	1	0	0	—		—		15	1
Halmstads BK	2025	Allsvenskan	0	0	0	0	—		—		0	0
Career total			251	55	26	7	6	0	6	2	289	64

== Honours ==
Bradford City

- Football League Cup runner-up: 2012–13

BK Häcken

- Allsvenskan: 2022
