= 2017–18 National League =

Season in English football

National League
- Season: 2017–18

The 2017–18 National League season, known as the Vanarama National League for sponsorship reasons, was the third season under English football's new title of National League, 14th season consisting of three divisions and the 39th season overall.

The National League covers the top two levels of non-League football in England. The National League is the fifth highest level of the overall pyramid, while the National League North and National League South exist at the sixth level. The top team and the winner of the play-off of the Premier division will be promoted to English Football League Two, while the bottom four are relegated to the North or South divisions. The champions of the North and South divisions will be promoted to the Premier division, alongside the play-off winners from each division. The bottom three in each of the North and South divisions are relegated to the premier divisions of the Northern Premier League, Isthmian League or Southern League.

This is the first season to include six teams in the play-offs for each division, with the 4th-7th placed teams participating in the qualifying round and the 2nd and 3rd placed teams qualifying for the semi-finals.

== National League ==
National League
- Season: 2017–18
- Champions: Macclesfield Town
- Promoted: Macclesfield Town; Tranmere Rovers
- Relegated: Chester; Guiseley; Torquay United; Woking

The National League consisted of 24 clubs.

=== Promotion and Relegation ===
The following teams changed divisions after the 2016–17 season:

AFC Fylde were the first team to be promoted after a 3–0 win against Boston United on 22 April 2017 clinched them the National League North title. Maidenhead United were promoted on 29 April 2017 after a 3–0 win over Margate, competing in the top tier of non-league for the first time. Ebbsfleet United were promoted on 13 May 2017 after beating Chelmsford City 2–1 in the National League South Playoff Final, returning to the league after a four-year absence. On the same day, FC Halifax Town were also promoted after beating Chorley 2–1 in the National League North playoff final, securing them an immediate return to the league.

Leyton Orient were relegated from League Two on 22 April 2017 after their 3–0 loss to Crewe Alexandra ending their 112-year stay in the English Football League. On 6 May 2017, despite a 2–1 victory over Doncaster Rovers on the same day, Hartlepool United became the second team to be relegated from League Two following Newport County's 2–1 victory over Notts County, ending their 96-year stay in the EFL.

The six teams replace Lincoln City, Forest Green Rovers, York City, Braintree Town, Southport and North Ferriby United. Lincoln City were promoted to League Two after beating Macclesfield Town 2–1 on 22 April 2017. Forest Green Rovers were promoted after beating Tranmere Rovers 3–1 in the 2016–17 National League Playoff Final on 14 May 2017. They were the league's longest serving club, completing nineteen seasons in the top-flight. This is a mantle that has now been passed to Wrexham, who enter their tenth season in the league.

Southport were the first team to be relegated on 21 April 2017 after a 3–0 loss to Dover Athletic, ending their seven-year stay in the league despite surviving several relegation battles over their tenure. North Ferriby United were the second team to be relegated on 24 April 2017 after a 3–1 defeat at Barrow, suffering an immediate return to the National League North. On the final day of the season, Braintree Town were relegated after losing 2–0 to Aldershot, ending their six-year stay in the league, which also confirmed the club's first relegation in their history. York City's 2–2 draw against Forest Green Rovers was also not enough to save them after Guiseley's last minute equalizer against Solihull Moors which confirmed back to back relegations for the Yorkshire club.

=== Team changes ===
==== To National League ====
Promoted from 2016–17 National League North

- AFC Fylde
- FC Halifax Town

Promoted from 2016–17 National League South

- Maidenhead United
- Ebbsfleet United

Relegated from 2016–17 League Two

- Hartlepool United
- Leyton Orient

==== From National League ====
Relegated to 2017–18 National League North

- York City
- Southport
- North Ferriby United

Relegated to 2017–18 National League South

- Braintree Town

Promoted to 2017–18 League Two

- Lincoln City
- Forest Green Rovers

=== Stadia and locations ===
Locations of the 2017–18 National League clubs (Greater London shown in more detail below)
Locations of the 2017–18 National League clubs (Greater London)

Team	Location	Stadium	Capacity
AFC Fylde	Wesham	Mill Farm Sports Village	6,000
Aldershot Town	Aldershot	Recreation Ground	7,200
Barrow	Barrow-in-Furness	Holker Street	5,045
Boreham Wood	Borehamwood	Meadow Park	4,502
Bromley	London (Bromley)	Hayes Lane	5,300
Chester	Chester	Deva Stadium	6,500
Dagenham & Redbridge	London (Dagenham)	Victoria Road	6,078
Dover Athletic	Dover	Crabble Athletic Ground	5,745
Eastleigh	Eastleigh	Ten Acres	5,250
Ebbsfleet United	Northfleet	Stonebridge Road	4,500
FC Halifax Town	Halifax	The Shay	14,061
Gateshead	Gateshead	Gateshead International Stadium	11,800
Guiseley	Guiseley	Nethermoor Park	4,200
Hartlepool United	Hartlepool	Victoria Park	7,856
Leyton Orient	London (Leyton)	Brisbane Road	9,271
Macclesfield Town	Macclesfield	Moss Rose	6,355
Maidenhead United	Maidenhead	York Road	3,377
Maidstone United	Maidstone	Gallagher Stadium	4,200
Solihull Moors	Solihull	Damson Park	4,313
Sutton United	London (Sutton)	Gander Green Lane	5,013
Torquay United	Torquay	Plainmoor	6,200
Tranmere Rovers	Birkenhead	Prenton Park	16,789
Woking	Woking	Kingfield Stadium	6,036
Wrexham	Wrexham	Racecourse Ground	10,771

=== League table ===
Pos	Team	Pld	W	D	L	GF	GA	GD	Pts	Promotion, qualification or relegation
1	Macclesfield Town (C, P)	46	27	11	8	67	46	+21	92	Promotion to EFL League Two
2	Tranmere Rovers (O, P)	46	24	10	12	78	46	+32	82	Qualification for the National League play-off semi-finals
3	Sutton United	46	23	10	13	67	53	+14	79	Qualification for the National League play-off semi-finals
4	Boreham Wood	46	20	15	11	64	47	+17	75	Qualification for the National League play-off quarter-finals
5	Aldershot Town	46	20	15	11	64	52	+12	75	Qualification for the National League play-off quarter-finals
6	Ebbsfleet United	46	19	17	10	64	50	+14	74	Qualification for the National League play-off quarter-finals
7	AFC Fylde	46	20	13	13	82	56	+26	73	Qualification for the National League play-off quarter-finals
8	Dover Athletic	46	20	13	13	62	44	+18	73	
9	Bromley	46	19	13	14	75	58	+17	70	
10	Wrexham	46	17	19	10	49	39	+10	70	
11	Dagenham & Redbridge	46	19	11	16	69	62	+7	68	
12	Maidenhead United	46	17	13	16	65	66	−1	64	
13	Leyton Orient	46	16	12	18	58	56	+2	60	
14	Eastleigh	46	13	17	16	65	72	−7	56	
15	Hartlepool United	46	14	14	18	53	63	−10	56	
16	FC Halifax Town	46	13	16	17	48	58	−10	55	
17	Gateshead	46	12	18	16	62	58	+4	54	
18	Solihull Moors	46	14	12	20	49	60	−11	54	
19	Maidstone United	46	13	15	18	52	64	−12	54	
20	Barrow	46	11	16	19	51	63	−12	49	
21	Woking (R)	46	13	9	24	55	76	−21	48	Relegation to National League South
22	Torquay United (R)	46	10	12	24	45	73	−28	42	Relegation to National League South
23	Chester (R)	46	8	13	25	42	79	−37	37	Relegation to National League North
24	Guiseley (R)	46	7	12	27	44	89	−45	33	Relegation to National League North

Source: National League official site
Rules for classification: 1) Points; 2) Goal difference; 3) Number of goals scored; 4) Number of matches won; 5) Head-to-head results
(C) Champions; (O) Play-off winners; (P) Promoted; (R) Relegated

=== Play-offs ===
Qualifying round
5	Aldershot Town	1 (4)
6	Ebbsfleet United	1 (5)
4	Boreham Wood	2
7	AFC Fylde	1

Semi-finals
2	Tranmere Rovers	4
6	Ebbsfleet United	2
3	Sutton United	2
4	Boreham Wood	3

Final
2	Tranmere Rovers	2
4	Boreham Wood	1

==== Qualifying round ====
2 May 2018	Aldershot Town	1–1 (a.e.t.) (4–5 p)	Ebbsfleet United	Recreation Ground, Aldershot
19:00	Kabamba 106'	Report	Winfield 119'	Attendance: 3,319; Referee: Allan Young
	Penalties
	Reynolds (penalty scored); Rowe (penalty scored); Rendell (penalty scored); Kinsella (penalty missed); Robert (penalty missed); Oyeleke (penalty scored); Ward (penalty missed)		(penalty scored) Weston; (penalty missed) McCoy; (penalty missed) Powell; (penalty scored) Wabo; (penalty scored) Kedwell; (penalty scored) Connors; (penalty scored) Rance

3 May 2018	Boreham Wood	2–1	AFC Fylde	Meadow Park, Borehamwood
19:00	Turley 5'; Andrade 17'	Report	Grand 30'	Attendance: 1,244; Referee: Joseph Johnson

==== Semi-finals ====
5 May 2018	Tranmere Rovers	4–2 (a.e.t.)	Ebbsfleet United	Prenton Park, Birkenhead
12:15	Norwood 33'; Ginnelly 56'; Norwood 102'; Cole 112'		Coulson 16'; Weston 51'	Attendance: 8,898; Referee: P Wright

6 May 2018	Sutton United	2–3	Boreham Wood	Gander Green Lane, Sutton
15:00	Bolarinwa 82'; Lafayette 90+2'		Balanta 42'; Lafayette 53' (o.g.); Folivi 88'	Attendance: 2,730; Referee: Matt Donohue

==== Final ====
12 May 2018
15:00

Boreham Wood	1–2	Tranmere Rovers
Andrade 45+8'	Report	Cook 6'; Norwood 80'

Wembley Stadium, London
Attendance: 16,306

=== Results table ===
Home \ Away	FYL	ALD	BRW	BOR	BRO	CHR	D&R	DOV	EAS	EBB	GAT	GUI	HAL	HAR	LEY	MAC	MDH	MDS	SOL	SUT	TOR	TRA	WOK	WRE
AFC Fylde		7–1	1–0	2–2	2–2	1–1	2–2	3–1	2–2	1–1	0–0	2–1	2–0	3–3	0–1	6–0	1–4	3–0	1–1	2–1	2–0	5–2	1–2	2–0
Aldershot Town	2–1		1–1	2–0	1–1	1–2	1–1	0–2	0–2	0–0	1–0	6–0	0–1	2–1	2–2	1–2	1–0	1–1	1–0	2–2	3–2	2–1	3–1	2–0
Barrow	1–3	3–1		2–1	0–3	1–2	0–1	0–0	3–2	0–1	1–1	0–0	0–0	1–2	2–2	0–2	1–1	0–1	1–2	1–1	1–1	1–1	3–0	1–1
Boreham Wood	1–0	2–1	0–0		2–2	4–2	1–2	2–3	1–0	0–1	2–1	3–1	1–1	0–0	2–0	0–2	1–1	1–0	4–1	0–4	2–0	2–1	2–1	0–1
Bromley	0–1	0–2	0–0	3–2		1–1	3–1	2–2	0–0	4–2	0–0	2–1	3–0	2–0	6–1	1–1	2–3	2–2	1–0	0–1	3–1	0–1	2–0	1–1
Chester	1–1	0–0	3–2	1–2	3–2		0–4	0–2	3–1	1–1	1–3	0–2	0–0	1–1	0–1	0–2	2–0	1–3	1–0	2–3	0–2	0–2	0–2	0–1
Dagenham & Redbridge	2–0	0–2	2–1	2–3	5–1	3–2		1–0	1–2	3–3	3–1	3–2	3–1	4–2	0–0	1–0	1–0	2–1	1–3	1–2	1–0	0–4	1–1	0–1
Dover Athletic	0–1	1–2	1–1	0–1	1–2	4–0	1–0		2–0	1–1	3–2	2–1	0–0	4–0	1–0	2–0	1–1	2–2	1–0	0–1	1–0	0–1	3–1	1–0
Eastleigh	2–2	0–0	0–2	0–2	4–4	2–2	2–2	2–1		0–1	3–2	4–2	0–0	4–3	0–0	0–2	2–2	0–1	1–2	1–0	1–1	2–0	2–2	1–1
Ebbsfleet United	3–3	0–2	3–2	0–3	2–1	0–1	1–1	2–1	2–2		0–0	4–0	2–0	3–0	2–1	2–2	1–1	2–0	1–0	0–1	0–1	0–0	2–1	3–0
Gateshead	1–2	0–1	1–2	1–1	1–2	3–2	0–0	0–0	2–0	2–5		1–0	0–0	2–2	1–3	3–0	7–1	2–1	2–2	0–2	3–0	1–0	1–1	0–0
Guiseley	1–0	1–1	0–1	0–0	0–1	1–1	3–5	1–1	0–0	2–2	0–1		1–1	0–1	1–3	1–2	1–3	0–0	4–2	0–2	3–2	0–0	1–2	0–2
FC Halifax Town	2–1	0–2	0–1	2–1	2–1	4–0	2–1	1–2	3–3	1–2	2–2	2–0		2–0	1–2	1–4	3–2	0–2	0–0	2–1	1–1	0–2	0–0	0–0
Hartlepool United	0–2	0–2	1–0	0–0	2–1	1–1	1–0	0–1	1–2	0–1	2–2	0–1	4–0		1–0	1–2	1–2	3–1	0–1	1–1	1–1	1–1	3–2	0–2
Leyton Orient	1–2	2–3	4–1	0–0	0–1	2–2	2–0	1–1	1–1	1–1	0–2	4–1	0–3	1–2		0–1	0–1	2–0	3–1	4–1	0–1	1–1	3–0	1–0
Macclesfield Town	2–1	2–0	3–1	0–0	0–0	1–0	2–0	1–0	1–2	1–0	1–0	2–1	2–1	1–1	1–1		1–0	1–4	0–0	1–0	1–1	2–2	1–3	4–1
Maidenhead United	1–2	3–3	0–1	2–1	5–2	3–0	1–1	3–2	3–1	1–1	0–3	3–0	0–0	2–1	0–1	1–1		0–0	1–0	2–1	1–2	1–0	2–1	1–2
Maidstone United	1–0	1–1	0–1	0–4	0–2	1–0	0–0	2–2	2–3	1–2	2–2	1–1	0–0	1–2	0–2	2–2	1–1		1–1	1–0	1–0	2–3	3–1	2–1
Solihull Moors	0–4	0–0	3–3	0–0	2–0	2–0	2–2	3–2	1–4	1–3	1–1	3–1	0–1	1–2	1–0	0–1	3–1	1–0		0–2	1–1	0–2	3–0	0–0
Sutton United	2–1	2–1	3–2	1–1	0–3	3–2	2–1	2–2	2–0	0–0	1–1	4–0	3–2	1–1	2–0	2–1	0–2	1–3	1–0		0–1	1–3	2–0	1–1
Torquay United	1–3	0–0	3–1	2–4	0–4	1–1	0–3	0–2	1–2	1–1	1–1	3–4	1–0	0–2	3–0	0–1	4–0	0–1	1–2	2–3		0–0	2–1	0–0
Tranmere Rovers	4–1	2–0	1–0	2–2	1–0	0–0	2–0	0–1	3–1	3–0	4–2	4–0	4–2	1–2	2–1	1–4	3–2	4–0	1–2	0–1	3–0		3–1	0–1
Woking	1–0	1–2	1–2	0–0	0–2	1–0	1–0	1–2	2–1	1–0	2–1	2–3	1–3	1–1	0–2	2–3	1–1	4–4	2–1	2–0	4–1	0–1		2–2
Wrexham	0–0	2–2	3–3	0–1	2–0	2–0	1–2	0–0	2–1	2–0	1–0	1–1	1–1	0–0	2–2	0–1	2–0	1–0	1–0	1–1	4–0	2–2	1–0	

Updated to match(es) played on 28 April 2018. Source: The Vanarama National League
Legend: Blue = home team win; Yellow = draw; Red = away team win.

=== Top scorers ===
Rank	Player	Club	Goals
1	(England) Andy Cook	Tranmere Rovers	26
2	(England) Danny Rowe	AFC Fylde	24
3	(Zimbabwe) Macauley Bonne	Leyton Orient	22
4	(Portugal) Bruno Andrade	Boreham Wood	20
4	(England) James Norwood	Tranmere Rovers	20
6	(England) Danny Kedwell	Ebbsfleet United	18
7	(England) Josh Rees	Bromley	16
7	(England) Ryan Bird	Dover Athletic	16
9	(Guyana) Morgan Ferrier	Dagenham / Boreham Wood	15
10	(England) Scott Wilson	Macclesfield	14

=== Monthly Awards ===
Each month the Vanarama National League announces their official Player of the Month and Manager of the Month.

Month	Player of the Month	Club	Manager of the Month	Club
August 2017	(England) Nathan Vaughan	Solihull Moors	(England) John Still	Dagenham & Redbridge
September 2017	(England) Scott Wilson	Macclesfield Town	(England) Jay Saunders	Maidstone United
October 2017	(England) Josh Rees	Bromley	(England) Craig Harrison	Hartlepool United
November 2017	(England) Danny Rowe	AFC Fylde	(England) Luke Garrard	Boreham Wood
December 2017	(England) Connor Jennings	Tranmere Rovers	(England) John Askey	Macclesfield Town
January 2018	(England) Sam Wood	Eastleigh	(England) Mark Yates	Solihull Moors
February 2018	(England) Elliott Durrell	Macclesfield Town	(Republic of Ireland) Daryl McMahon	Ebbsfleet United
March 2018	(England) Mitch Walker	Dover Athletic	(England) Matthew Bates	Hartlepool United
April 2018	(England) Andy Cook	Tranmere Rovers	(England) Alan Devonshire	Maidenhead United

=== Team of the Season ===
At the end of the season, the National League announced its official team of the season.

Position	Player	Club
Goalkeeper	(Iraq) Shwan Jalal	Macclesfield Town
Defender	(England) Shaun Pearson	Wrexham
Defender	(England) Steve McNulty	Tranmere Rovers
Defender	(England) Manny Smith	Wrexham
Midfielder	(England) Elliott Durrell	Macclesfield Town
Midfielder	(England) Danny Whitaker	Macclesfield Town
Midfielder	(England) Craig Eastmond	Sutton United
Midfielder	(England) Louis Dennis	Bromley
Forward	(England) Andy Cook	Tranmere Rovers
Forward	(England) Danny Rowe	AFC Fylde
Forward	(Portugal) Bruno Andrade	Boreham Wood

== National League North ==
National League North
- Season: 2017–18
- Champions: Salford City
- Promoted: Salford City; Harrogate Town
- Relegated: North Ferriby United; Gainsborough Trinity; Tamworth

=== Team changes ===
==== To National League North ====
Promoted from 2016–17 Northern Premier League Premier Division

- Blyth Spartans
- Spennymoor Town

Promoted from 2016–17 Southern League Premier Division

- Leamington

Relegated from 2016–17 National League

- York City
- Southport
- North Ferriby United

==== From National League North ====
Relegated to 2017–18 Northern Premier League Premier Division

- Altrincham
- Stalybridge Celtic

Relegated and voluntarily demoted to 2017–18 Midland League Premier Division

- Worcester City

Transferred to 2017–18 National League South

- Gloucester City

Promoted to 2017–18 National League

- AFC Fylde
- FC Halifax Town

=== Stadia and locations ===
Locations of the 2017–18 National League North clubs (Greater Manchester shown in more detail below)
Locations of the 2017–18 National League North clubs (Greater Manchester)

Team	Location	Stadium	Capacity
AFC Telford United	Telford	New Bucks Head	6,300
Alfreton Town	Alfreton	North Street	3,600
Blyth Spartans	Blyth	Croft Park	4,435
Boston United	Boston	York Street	6,643
Brackley Town	Brackley	St. James Park	3,500
Bradford Park Avenue	Bradford	Horsfall Stadium	3,500
Chorley	Chorley	Victory Park	4,100
Curzon Ashton	Ashton-under-Lyne	Tameside Stadium	4,000
Darlington	Darlington	Blackwell Meadows	3,300
F.C. United of Manchester	Manchester	Broadhurst Park	4,400
Gainsborough Trinity	Gainsborough	The Northolme	4,304
Harrogate Town	Harrogate	Wetherby Road	3,800
Kidderminster Harriers	Kidderminster	Aggborough Stadium	6,238
Leamington	Leamington	New Windmill Ground	3,000
North Ferriby United	North Ferriby	Grange Lane	2,200
Nuneaton Town	Nuneaton	Liberty Way	4,614
Salford City	Salford	Moor Lane	5,106
Southport	Southport	Haig Avenue	6,008
Spennymoor Town	Spennymoor	The Brewery Field	2,900
Stockport County	Stockport	Edgeley Park	10,852
Tamworth	Tamworth	The Lamb Ground	4,000
York City	York	Bootham Crescent	8,256

=== League table ===
Pos	Team	Pld	W	D	L	GF	GA	GD	Pts	Promotion, qualification or relegation
1	Salford City (C, P)	42	28	7	7	80	45	+35	91	Promotion to National League
2	Harrogate Town (O, P)	42	26	7	9	100	49	+51	85	Qualification for the National League North play-off semi-finals
3	Brackley Town	42	23	11	8	72	37	+35	80	Qualification for the National League North play-off semi-finals
4	Kidderminster Harriers	42	20	12	10	76	50	+26	72	Qualification for the National League North play-off quarter-finals
5	Stockport County	42	20	9	13	75	57	+18	69	Qualification for the National League North play-off quarter-finals
6	Chorley	42	18	14	10	52	39	+13	68	Qualification for the National League North play-off quarter-finals
7	Bradford (Park Avenue)	42	18	9	15	66	56	+10	63	Qualification for the National League North play-off quarter-finals
8	Spennymoor Town	42	18	9	15	71	67	+4	63	
9	Boston United	42	17	9	16	67	66	+1	60	
10	Blyth Spartans	42	19	2	21	76	69	+7	59	
11	York City	42	16	10	16	65	62	+3	58	
12	Darlington	42	14	13	15	58	58	0	55	
13	Nuneaton Town	42	14	13	15	50	57	−7	55	
14	AFC Telford United	42	16	5	21	55	69	−14	53	
15	Southport	42	14	8	20	60	72	−12	50	
16	FC United of Manchester	42	14	8	20	58	72	−14	50	
17	Alfreton Town	42	14	7	21	67	71	−4	49	
18	Curzon Ashton	42	12	13	17	52	66	−14	49	
19	Leamington	42	13	10	19	51	65	−14	49	
20	Gainsborough Trinity (R)	42	14	4	24	47	73	−26	46	Relegation to the Northern Premier League Premier Division
21	Tamworth (R)	42	11	9	22	55	77	−22	42	Relegation to the Southern League Premier Division Central
22	North Ferriby United (R)	42	4	9	29	25	101	−76	21	Relegation to the Northern Premier League Premier Division

Source: National League official site
Rules for classification: 1) Points; 2) Goal difference; 3) Number of goals scored; 4) Number of matches won; 5) Head-to-head results
(C) Champions; (O) Play-off winners; (P) Promoted; (R) Relegated

=== Play-offs ===
Qualifying round
5	Stockport County	0
6	Chorley	1
4	Kidderminster Harriers	0
7	Bradford Park Avenue	2

Semi-finals
2	Harrogate Town	2
6	Chorley	1
3	Brackley Town	1
7	Bradford Park Avenue	0

Final
2	Harrogate Town	3
3	Brackley Town	0

==== Qualifying round ====
2 May 2018	Stockport County	0–1	Chorley	Edgeley Park, Stockport
19:45 (UTC+01:00)		Report 1 Report 2	Walker 68'	Attendance: 6,230

2 May 2018	Kidderminster Harriers	0–2	Bradford Park Avenue	Aggborough Stadium, Kidderminster
19:45 (UTC+01:00)		Report 1 Report 2	Boyes 10'; Johnson 78'	Attendance: 2,291

==== Semi-finals ====
6 May 2018	Harrogate Town	2–1	Chorley	Wetherby Road, Harrogate
15:00 (UTC+01:00)	Knowles 61' (pen.), 90'	Report	O'Keefe 35'; Molyneux (red card) 44'	Attendance: 2,307

6 May 2018	Brackley Town	1–0 (a.e.t.)	Bradford Park Avenue	St. James Park, Brackley
	Williams 110'	Report		Attendance: 923

==== Final ====
13 May 2018	Harrogate Town	3–0	Brackley Town	Wetherby Road, Harrogate
15:00	Knowles 26' (pen.), 40'; Leesley 71'			Attendance: 3,000

=== Results table ===
Home \ Away	TEL	ALF	BLY	BOS	BRK	BPA	CHO	CZA	DAR	FCU	GAI	HAR	KID	LEA	NFU	NUN	SLC	SOU	SPE	STP	TAM	YOR
AFC Telford United		1–2	2–3	2–1	1–3	1–4	1–2	0–3	0–0	1–0	3–2	1–5	0–0	3–2	3–0	1–2	0–2	1–1	3–2	3–2	2–0	3–5
Alfreton Town	0–1		2–0	2–3	1–1	1–3	0–2	4–0	1–1	1–0	4–1	1–2	0–2	4–1	1–0	1–1	2–3	0–1	1–4	1–3	2–1	2–3
Blyth Spartans	0–1	0–1		5–2	3–0	3–0	2–0	2–1	3–1	1–1	4–0	0–2	1–2	1–0	0–1	6–3	0–1	2–0	2–3	0–1	4–2	0–2
Boston United	1–0	3–1	2–1		2–3	1–2	2–0	3–3	1–1	4–4	2–0	3–0	3–2	0–1	2–1	1–1	0–1	3–2	0–3	2–2	3–1	2–1
Brackley Town	1–1	1–3	3–1	4–1		0–1	1–2	2–2	3–0	2–1	2–0	0–0	2–0	1–1	3–0	1–0	2–1	4–0	2–0	3–2	0–0	2–0
Bradford Park Avenue	2–1	3–3	4–1	2–1	2–0		0–0	3–1	0–1	3–0	5–0	3–1	1–1	1–0	0–1	1–1	1–2	1–2	1–2	2–3	3–4	0–5
Chorley	3–2	1–0	2–0	0–1	0–0	2–0		1–1	4–1	1–0	1–0	0–1	0–0	2–0	2–2	2–2	0–1	0–0	3–1	1–1	1–1	2–0
Curzon Ashton	1–0	2–2	0–3	2–1	0–2	1–1	0–2		1–0	1–0	2–0	1–2	1–2	1–1	4–0	2–2	1–1	2–2	1–0	1–1	1–0	4–1
Darlington	0–1	4–1	3–0	1–2	0–3	2–1	2–2	1–0		3–0	4–3	3–1	2–1	0–0	6–0	0–0	1–2	2–4	1–1	1–1	0–1	1–2
F.C. United of Manchester	3–1	3–2	1–3	2–1	1–1	4–0	0–0	2–0	1–2		1–0	3–2	1–2	1–2	0–2	2–1	3–2	1–0	2–3	0–1	3–1	1–0
Gainsborough Trinity	3–2	2–1	2–4	1–1	1–2	0–3	1–0	1–0	3–1	1–0		4–5	1–0	1–2	2–0	0–1	0–1	0–3	4–1	2–3	3–0	1–0
Harrogate Town	2–1	4–3	5–1	3–1	1–1	1–1	4–1	5–0	3–0	6–0	2–0		2–2	2–2	3–0	4–0	1–2	2–0	1–2	4–1	3–0	2–0
Kidderminster Harriers	2–0	2–1	5–4	1–1	2–1	1–2	0–1	2–2	3–3	4–0	3–0	0–2		2–0	4–0	3–0	4–4	3–0	2–2	3–1	2–0	2–1
Leamington	0–3	2–3	1–0	0–2	2–2	2–1	2–0	0–0	2–3	1–0	3–0	1–3	1–1		3–0	1–0	0–4	0–1	4–0	2–3	1–2	2–2
North Ferriby United	0–2	0–3	1–0	1–5	0–5	0–1	0–2	0–1	1–1	3–3	0–1	0–2	1–3	1–1		0–2	1–1	0–3	0–6	1–3	0–0	1–4
Nuneaton Town	0–2	2–2	2–2	1–1	0–2	0–0	1–1	1–1	2–1	1–0	0–1	2–1	1–0	4–0	2–2		0–2	3–0	0–1	1–3	4–1	1–0
Salford City	3–0	1–0	4–1	1–2	2–0	2–2	0–3	2–1	0–2	2–2	1–0	2–1	3–0	2–3	4–0	3–0		2–1	3–2	2–1	2–1	3–2
Southport	3–0	1–3	0–3	4–0	0–1	0–4	3–0	3–1	2–0	3–3	2–2	1–4	0–3	2–0	2–2	0–1	0–1		1–2	3–1	3–0	1–1
Spennymoor Town	1–2	2–1	3–1	0–0	0–3	3–0	1–0	2–4	1–2	4–4	1–1	3–1	1–1	1–0	1–1	0–1	1–1	2–1		1–0	1–0	2–4
Stockport County	1–0	1–0	1–3	1–0	0–1	0–0	1–1	3–0	1–1	4–1	1–0	2–2	1–2	4–0	4–1	0–1	2–2	6–0	3–2		3–2	2–0
Tamworth	2–2	2–3	0–3	2–1	1–1	0–1	3–4	4–1	0–0	0–2	1–2	1–1	2–1	0–3	4–1	2–0	1–2	3–3	3–1	3–1		1–1
York City	0–1	1–1	2–3	1–0	0–2	2–1	1–1	2–1	0–0	0–2	1–1	0–2	1–1	2–2	2–0	4–3	1–0	3–2	2–2	2–0	2–3	

Updated to match(es) played on 28 April 2018. Source: The Vanarama National League
Legend: Blue = home team win; Yellow = draw; Red = away team win.

=== Top scorers ===
As of matches played 24 April 2018

Rank	Player	Club	Goals
1	(England) Jason Gilchrist	Southport	26
2	(England) Jason Oswell	Stockport County	24
3	(England) Aaron Williams	Brackley Town	22
4	(Gibraltar) Reece Styche	Darlington	21
5	(England) Adam Boyes	Bradford Park Avenue	20
5	(England) Jon Parkin	York City	20
7	(England) Ashley Chambers	Nuneaton Town	19
7	(England) Joe Ironside	Kidderminster Harriers	19
7	(England) Glen Taylor	Spennymoor Town	19
10	(England) Marcus Dinanga	AFC Telford United	17
10	(England) Jack Redshaw	Salford City	17
12	(England) Dan Maguire	Blyth Spartans	16

== National League South ==
National League South
- Season: 2017–18
- Champions: Havant & Waterlooville
- Promoted: Havant & Waterlooville; Braintree Town
- Relegated: Bognor Regis Town; Whitehawk; Poole Town

The National League South consisted of 22 clubs.

=== Team changes ===
==== To National League South ====
Promoted from 2016–17 Southern League Premier Division

- Chippenham Town

Promoted from 2016–17 Isthmian League Premier Division

- Havant & Waterlooville
- Bognor Regis Town

Relegated from 2016–17 National League

- Braintree Town

Transferred from 2016–17 National League North

- Gloucester City

==== From National League South ====
Relegated to 2017–18 Isthmian League Premier Division

- Margate

Relegated to 2017–18 Southern League Premier Division

- Gosport Borough
- Bishop's Stortford

Promoted to 2017–18 National League

- Maidenhead United
- Ebbsfleet United

=== Stadia and locations ===
Locations of the 2017–18 National League South clubs (Greater London shown in more detail below)
Locations of the 2017–18 National League South clubs (Greater London)

Team	Location	Stadium	Capacity
Bath City	Bath (Twerton)	Twerton Park	8,840
Bognor Regis Town	Bognor Regis	Nyewood Lane	4,500
Braintree Town	Braintree	Cressing Road	4,222
Chelmsford City	Chelmsford	Melbourne Stadium	3,019
Chippenham Town	Chippenham	Hardenhuish Park	3,000
Concord Rangers	Canvey Island	Thames Road	3,300
Dartford	Dartford	Princes Park	4,100
East Thurrock United	Corringham	Rookery Hill	4,000
Eastbourne Borough	Eastbourne	Priory Lane	4,151
Gloucester City	Evesham	Jubilee Stadium (groundshare with Evesham United)	3,000
Hampton & Richmond Borough	London (Hampton)	Beveree Stadium	3,500
Havant & Waterlooville	Havant	Westleigh Park	5,300
Hemel Hempstead Town	Hemel Hempstead	Vauxhall Road	3,152
Hungerford Town	Hungerford	Bulpit Lane	2,500
Oxford City	Oxford (Marston)	Court Place Farm	2,000
Poole Town	Poole	The BlackGold Stadium	2,500
St Albans City	St Albans	Clarence Park	4,500
Truro City	Truro	Treyew Road	3,857
Wealdstone	London (Ruislip)	Grosvenor Vale	3,607
Welling United	London (Welling)	Park View Road	4,000
Weston-super-Mare	Weston-super-Mare	Woodspring Stadium	3,500
Whitehawk	Brighton	The TerraPura Ground	3,126

=== League table ===
Pos	Team	Pld	W	D	L	GF	GA	GD	Pts	Promotion, qualification or relegation
1	Havant & Waterlooville (C, P)	42	25	11	6	70	30	+40	86	Promotion to National League
2	Dartford	42	26	8	8	81	44	+37	86	Qualification for the National League South play-off semi-finals
3	Chelmsford City	42	21	11	10	68	45	+23	74	Qualification for the National League South play-off semi-finals
4	Hampton & Richmond Borough	42	18	18	6	58	37	+21	72	Qualification for the National League South play-off quarter-finals
5	Hemel Hempstead Town	42	19	13	10	71	51	+20	70	Qualification for the National League South play-off quarter-finals
6	Braintree Town (O, P)	42	19	13	10	73	55	+18	69 (Note: Braintree Town were deducted one point for fielding an ineligible player in matches earlier in the season.)	Qualification for the National League South play-off quarter-finals
7	Truro City	42	20	9	13	71	55	+16	69	Qualification for the National League South play-off quarter-finals
8	St Albans City	42	19	8	15	71	58	+13	65	
9	Bath City	42	17	12	13	64	48	+16	63	
10	Welling United	42	17	10	15	68	59	+9	61	
11	Wealdstone	42	16	11	15	64	62	+2	59	
12	Weston-super-Mare	42	16	7	19	66	73	−7	55	
13	Chippenham Town	42	15	9	18	64	70	−6	54	
14	Gloucester City	42	15	8	19	56	70	−14	53	
15	East Thurrock United	42	13	11	18	68	84	−16	50	
16	Oxford City	42	13	10	19	60	69	−9	49	
17	Concord Rangers	42	12	10	20	46	62	−16	46	
18	Eastbourne Borough	42	13	7	22	57	80	−23	46	
19	Hungerford Town	42	12	7	23	45	68	−23	43	
20	Poole Town (R)	42	11	9	22	47	73	−26	42	Relegation to the Southern League Premier Division South
21	Whitehawk (R)	42	8	10	24	51	89	−38	34	Relegation to the Isthmian League Premier Division
22	Bognor Regis Town (R)	42	5	12	25	41	78	−37	27	Relegation to the Isthmian League Premier Division

Source: National League official site
Rules for classification: 1) Points; 2) Goal difference; 3) Number of goals scored; 4) Number of matches won; 5) Head-to-head results
(C) Champions; (O) Play-off winners; (P) Promoted; (R) Relegated

=== Play-offs ===
Qualifying round
5	Hemel Hempstead Town	0 (2)
6	Braintree Town	0 (3)
4	Hampton & Richmond Borough	3
7	Truro City	1

Semi-finals
2	Dartford	0
6	Braintree Town	1
3	Chelmsford City	0
4	Hampton & Richmond Borough	1

Final
4	Hampton & Richmond Borough	1 (3)
6	Braintree Town	1 (4)

==== Qualifying round ====
2 May 2018	Hemel Hempstead Town	0–0 (a.e.t.) (2–3 p)	Braintree Town	Vauxhall Road, Hemel Hempstead
19:45		Report		Attendance: 1,165
	Penalties
	Parkes (penalty scored); McCall (penalty scored); Shulton (penalty missed); Moyo (penalty missed); Watt (penalty missed)		(penalty scored) Barrington; (penalty scored) Allen; (penalty missed) Wright; (penalty scored) Thompson

2 May 2018	Hampton & Richmond Borough	3–1 (a.e.t.)	Truro City	Beveree Stadium, Hampton
19:45	Cook 34'; Hudson-Odoi 99', 120'	Report	Neal 8'	Attendance: 922

==== Semi-finals ====
6 May 2018	Dartford	0–1	Braintree Town	Princes Park, Dartford
		Report		Attendance: 1,704

6 May 2018	Chelmsford City	0–1	Hampton & Richmond Borough	Melbourne Stadium, Chelmsford
		Report		Attendance: 1,651

==== Final ====
13 May 2018	Hampton & Richmond Borough	1–1 (3–4 p)	Braintree Town	Beveree Stadium, Hampton
15:00				Attendance: 3,127

=== Results table ===
Home \ Away	BAT	BOG	BRA	CHE	CHI	CON	DAR	EAB	ETU	GLO	H&R	H&W	HEM	HUN	OXC	POO	SAC	TRU	WEA	WEL	WSM	WHI
Bath City		0–0	1–1	1–2	2–5	2–0	1–2	0–1	4–0	5–1	2–0	1–2	0–0	5–0	2–1	1–0	2–1	0–0	0–0	1–1	0–2	1–1
Bognor Regis Town	3–2		2–1	0–1	1–3	1–2	1–2	0–1	0–2	2–2	1–2	0–3	2–3	1–2	0–0	1–1	2–1	0–2	0–3	1–3	1–1	6–2
Braintree Town	0–2	3–0		2–2	2–0	2–1	2–2	3–2	4–0	3–0	2–1	1–3	1–2	5–0	0–0	1–0	1–0	1–1	2–2	1–1	0–1	4–3
Chelmsford City	1–1	0–0	2–2		2–0	1–0	1–0	5–2	1–2	2–0	1–2	0–2	3–3	1–1	1–2	2–1	0–2	2–0	3–0	4–1	1–1	4–2
Chippenham Town	0–3	1–0	1–1	3–2		1–2	2–2	4–0	2–2	2–0	3–3	0–0	5–1	1–2	3–2	0–1	3–3	2–0	0–0	1–0	2–0	2–1
Concord Rangers	0–1	2–1	0–1	0–2	4–2		1–1	2–1	1–4	1–1	1–0	1–1	1–0	1–0	2–1	0–1	1–2	2–2	3–1	0–2	2–2	1–0
Dartford	2–0	3–1	2–1	3–2	3–0	2–0		4–2	2–1	4–1	1–0	1–0	3–2	1–0	7–1	2–1	2–1	4–1	4–3	4–1	3–1	3–1
Eastbourne Borough	2–3	3–0	2–3	0–3	4–2	3–1	0–1		2–2	0–1	1–2	1–4	0–2	4–1	2–0	0–4	1–1	1–3	1–1	0–0	1–2	1–4
East Thurrock United	1–1	2–0	5–3	2–4	0–2	2–3	0–1	0–0		3–0	1–1	0–1	0–1	0–1	4–1	2–2	1–1	1–2	1–1	0–1	3–4	4–2
Gloucester City	2–1	3–2	1–3	0–2	1–0	1–0	0–1	1–2	3–1		1–1	0–1	1–0	4–0	0–1	2–2	1–4	0–3	2–2	0–1	1–3	3–1
Hampton & Richmond Borough	3–1	1–0	1–1	1–1	1–0	1–1	2–2	1–1	5–1	1–1		0–1	0–0	3–1	1–0	1–0	1–0	1–1	1–1	1–1	3–1	1–1
Havant & Waterlooville	1–2	0–0	0–0	1–1	4–0	3–2	0–0	3–2	6–1	2–1	0–0		1–1	2–0	3–2	2–2	2–1	1–2	1–0	2–3	2–0	4–0
Hemel Hempstead Town	1–1	3–1	4–3	3–1	3–1	1–1	0–3	3–0	2–0	3–1	1–0	0–0		1–2	2–0	0–1	2–0	1–2	1–0	2–2	1–1	3–0
Hungerford Town	1–2	1–1	0–1	1–1	2–1	2–0	1–0	0–1	2–2	2–3	2–2	0–1	0–2		1–2	4–0	3–1	0–1	1–3	1–4	2–0	0–1
Oxford City	1–1	4–0	1–2	2–0	0–1	1–1	0–2	2–1	3–3	0–3	0–0	0–1	4–1	2–0		2–3	2–3	3–1	3–2	1–1	3–3	0–1
Poole Town	0–4	2–2	0–3	0–0	2–0	1–1	0–1	0–4	2–3	0–3	0–1	1–3	2–4	1–2	2–0		0–1	0–3	2–1	2–3	3–1	1–1
St Albans City	2–0	1–2	2–1	2–1	2–0	2–1	4–0	2–2	7–2	2–3	1–3	2–1	2–2	0–0	1–1	2–1		0–1	2–1	1–2	3–1	0–3
Truro City	1–2	1–1	1–2	2–0	1–0	2–0	3–1	0–1	1–2	1–1	1–1	1–0	3–3	2–1	2–3	3–1	1–2		1–3	3–2	3–1	7–2
Wealdstone	2–1	3–0	3–1	0–2	4–4	2–1	1–2	2–3	3–0	1–2	0–3	0–1	1–1	1–0	1–1	4–1	1–3	2–1		1–0	2–1	2–1
Welling United	0–2	3–3	3–0	0–1	4–0	3–3	2–3	3–0	0–3	2–3	0–1	0–1	0–0	3–2	1–3	2–0	3–1	2–2	1–2		3–1	1–0
Weston-super-Mare	4–2	1–0	1–2	0–1	2–2	1–0	3–0	5–1	2–2	2–1	1–2	1–4	2–1	2–1	4–2	1–2	0–2	0–2	5–1	0–2		1–0
Whitehawk	1–1	2–2	1–1	0–2	1–3	2–0	0–4	0–1	2–3	1–1	1–3	0–0	0–5	0–3	0–3	2–2	1–1	3–2	0–1	2–1	5–1	

Updated to match(es) played on 28 April 2018. Source: The Vanarama National League
Legend: Blue = home team win; Yellow = draw; Red = away team win.

=== Top scorers ===
As of matches played 24 April 2018

Rank	Player	Club	Goals
1	(England) Sam Higgins	East Thurrock United	25
2	(England) Alfie Pavey	Dartford	22
2	(England) Jason Prior	Havant & Waterlooville	22
4	(England) Sam Merson	St Albans City	20
4	(Scotland) Matt Paterson	Oxford City	20
6	(Wales) Gethyn Hill	Weston-super-Mare	19
7	(Republic of Ireland) Philip Roberts	Braintree Town	18
8	(England) Warren Bentley	Poole Town	17
9	(England) Dayle Grubb	Weston-super-Mare	16
