= 2016–17 Oxford United F.C. season =

English football club season

Oxford United
2016–17 season
- Chairman: Darryl Eales
- Head Coach: Michael Appleton
- Stadium: Kassam Stadium
- League One: 8th
- FA Cup: 5th round (eliminated by Middlesbrough)
- League Cup: 2nd round (eliminated by Brighton)
- League Trophy: Runners-up (beaten by Coventry City)
- Top goalscorer: League: Maguire (13); All: Maguire (17)
- Highest home attendance: 11,810 v Newcastle United, 27 January 2017
- Lowest home attendance: 1,383 v Scunthorpe United, 10 January 2017

The 2016–17 season was Oxford United's first season back in League One after gaining promotion the previous season, and their 123rd year in existence. As well as competing in League One, the club also participated in the FA Cup, League Cup and League Trophy.

Oxford lost three key players in the close season, Kemar Roofe departing for Leeds for a club record of £3m, Callum O'Dowda (less expectedly) to Bristol City for around £1m, and striker Danny Hylton who declined a contract renewal offer and joined Luton Town in League Two. United narrowly failed to sign Matty Taylor to replace the goal-scoring potential of these three players, but Chris Maguire, after protracted negotiations, signed a one-year contract extension and strikers Wes Thomas and Kane Hemmings were brought in to boost the forward line, the latter for a £250,000 fee. Manager Michael Appleton's first summer signing was goalkeeper Simon Eastwood. Eastwood had previously been on Oxford's books as cover for Ryan Clarke in 2010–11 but had failed to make an appearance. Another returning player was Rob Hall, a former loanee signed from Bolton Wanderers despite carrying a long-term injury. United spent what was believed to be a club record fee to secure the services of winger Marvin Johnson from Motherwell, and the defence was bolstered by the arrival of Christian Ribeiro, Aaron Martin and Curtis Nelson. Young midfielder John Lundstram was appointed captain to replace defender Jake Wright (who joined former Oxford manager Chris Wilder at eventual champions Sheffield United) and his deputy Johnny Mullins (who was not offered a new contract and joined teammate Hylton at Luton Town). Notable loanees from Premier League sides included Dan Crowley from Arsenal, Toni Martínez from West Ham and Conor McAleny from Everton.

After a shaky start which saw them in the relegation places after three games, League One newcomers United recovered strongly to finish 8th in the table, four points off the last playoff position, the highest of the promoted teams and in their highest placing at any point of the season. They again completed the double over local rivals Swindon Town, who were relegated to League Two. Eastwood, in stark contrast to his previous stint at the club, played every minute of United's 62 games in all competitions (the most competitive games played by any league team for the second season in succession) and was voted the club's Player of the Season by both fans and teammates at the end of the season. Maguire was the team's highest scorer with 17 goals in all competitions, with Hemmings chipping in with 15 and loanee McAleny scoring 10 in 18 League appearances in the second half of the season, including two hat-tricks. In total, Oxford scored 100 goals in all competitions.

For the second year running, Oxford reached the final of the League Trophy at Wembley Stadium but finished runners-up in the competition, this time beaten 2–1 by Coventry City. This was the club's fourth visit to the national stadium. They reached the fifth round of the FA Cup, beating Rotherham United and Newcastle United of the Championship before being eliminated by Middlesbrough of the Premier League. In the first round of the League Cup they also defeated Championship opposition in the shape of Birmingham City, but were knocked out in the second round by Brighton & Hove Albion.

The season covers the period from 1 July 2016 to 30 June 2017.

== Transfers ==
=== Transfers in ===
Date from	Position	Nationality	Name	From	Fee	Ref.
1 July 2016	GK	(England)	Simon Eastwood	Blackburn Rovers	Free transfer	
1 July 2016	CB	(England)	Aaron Martin	Coventry City	Free transfer	
1 July 2016	RB	(Wales)	Christian Ribeiro	Exeter City	Free transfer	
1 July 2016	CF	(England)	Wes Thomas	Birmingham City	Free transfer	
4 July 2016	CB	(England)	Curtis Nelson	Plymouth Argyle	Undisclosed	
12 July 2016	CM	(England)	Joe Rothwell	Manchester United	Undisclosed	
19 July 2016	CF	(England)	Robert Hall	Bolton Wanderers	Free transfer	
27 July 2016	CF	(England)	Kane Hemmings	Dundee	£250,000	
25 August 2016	CM	(England)	Ryan Ledson	Everton	Undisclosed	
31 August 2016	MF	(England)	Marvin Johnson	Motherwell	Undisclosed	
5 January 2017	CM	(England)	James Cowan	Dundee	Undisclosed	

=== Transfers out ===
Date from	Position	Nationality	Name	To	Fee	Ref.
1 July 2016	CF	(England)	Jordan Bowery	Leyton Orient	Released	(Note: Following Bowery's release, he signed for Leyton Orient.)
1 July 2016	LM	(Antigua and Barbuda)	AJ George	Free agent	Released	
1 July 2016	LB	(England)	Freddie Grant	Oxford City	Released	(Note: Following Grant's release, he signed for Oxford City.)
1 July 2016	CF	(Republic of Ireland)	Patrick Hoban	Mansfield Town	Released	(Note: Following Hoban's release, he signed for Mansfield Town.)
1 July 2016	CF	(England)	Danny Hylton	Luton Town	Free transfer	
1 July 2016	CB	(England)	Johnny Mullins	Luton Town	Released	Following Mullins' release, he signed for Luton Town.
7 July 2016	LW	(England)	Kemar Roofe	Leeds United	£3,000,000	
9 July 2016	CB	(England)	Jake Wright	Sheffield United	Mutual consent	(Note: Following Wright's departure, he signed for Sheffield United.)
14 July 2016	LW	(Republic of Ireland)	Callum O'Dowda	Bristol City	£1,000,000 + add ons	
19 July 2016	GK	(England)	Sam Slocombe	Blackpool	Mutual consent	(Note: Following Slocombe's release, he signed for Blackpool.)
4 August 2016	GK	(New Zealand)	Max Crocombe	Carlisle United	Mutual consent	(Note: Following Crocombe's departure, he signed for Carlisle United.)
5 January 2017	CF	(England)	George Jeacock	Free agent	Mutual consent	
30 January 2017	CF	(England)	Ryan Taylor	Plymouth Argyle	Mutual consent	
31 January 2017	MF	(Scotland)	Alex MacDonald	Mansfield Town	Mutual consent	

=== Loans in ===
Date from	Position	Nationality	Name	From	Date until	Ref.
1 July 2016	AM	(England)	Daniel Crowley	Arsenal	2 December 2016	(Note: On 2 December 2016, Daniel Crowley's loan from Arsenal was terminated by mutual consent.)
28 July 2016	CF	(Wales)	Tyler Roberts	West Bromwich Albion	3 January 2017	
19 August 2016	RB	(England)	Phil Edwards	Burton Albion	End of season	
31 August 2016	CB	(England)	Charlie Raglan	Chesterfield	End of season	(Note: On 3 January 2017, Charlie Raglan's loan from Chesterfield was extended until the end of the season.)
23 January 2017	CF	(Spain)	Toni Martínez	West Ham United	End of season	
31 January 2017	CF	(England)	Conor McAleny	Everton	End of season	

=== Loans out ===
Date from	Position	Nationality	Name	To	Date until	Ref.
5 August 2016	CB	(England)	Robbie Cundy	Oxford City	2 September 2016	
5 August 2016	GK	(England)	Jack Stevens	Oxford City	2 September 2016	
7 September 2016	CM	(England)	John Ashby	Oxford City	31 December 2016	
7 September 2016	RM	(England)	Jonny Giles	Oxford City	7 December 2016	
7 September 2016	CF	(England)	James Roberts	Oxford City	31 December 2016	
9 September 2016	CF	(England)	George Jeacock	Banbury United	7 October 2016	
8 December 2016	CB	(England)	Miles Welch-Hayes	Bath City	5 January 2017	
2 January 2017	RM	(England)	Jonny Giles	Aldershot Town	End of season	
9 January 2017	CB	(England)	Robbie Cundy	Southport	6 February 2017	
24 February 2017	CF	(England)	James Roberts	Stalybridge Celtic	End of season	
4 March 2017	GK	(Liechtenstein)	Benjamin Büchel	Barnet	11 March 2017	

== Competitions ==
=== Pre-season friendlies ===
9 July 2016 Friendly	Solihull Moors	1–1	Oxford United	Solihull
15:00 BST	Hayden 68'	Report	Thomas 54'	Stadium: Damson Park

12 July 2016 Friendly	Alhaurín de la Torre	0–2	Oxford United	Alhaurín de la Torre
19:30 BST		Report	Ashby 37'; Roberts 64'	Stadium: Los Manantiales

15 July 2016 Friendly	Marbella	1–0	Oxford United	La Cala
18:00 BST		Report

19 July 2016 Friendly	Oxford United	1–2	Leicester City	Oxford
19:45 BST	Maguire 13'	Report	Gray 28'; Schlupp 68'	Stadium: Kassam Stadium; Attendance: 9,487; Referee: John Busby

26 July 2016 Friendly	Oxford United	0–4	Brighton & Hove Albion	Oxford
19:45 BST		Report	Knockaert 17'; Cadman 67'; Hemed 76' 85'	Stadium: Kassam Stadium; Attendance: 2,498; Referee: John Busby

30 July 2015 Friendly	Barnet	3–3	Oxford United	Canons Park
15:00 BST	Weston 6'; Akinde 10', 66' (pen.)	Report	Thomas 43', 46'; Crowley 80'	Stadium: The Hive Stadium

=== League One ===
==== League table ====
Pos	Team	Pld	W	D	L	GF	GA	GD	Pts	Promotion, qualification or relegation
6	Millwall (O, P)	46	20	13	13	66	57	+9	73	Qualification for the League One play-offs (Note: Four teams play for one spot and promotion to the EFL Championship.)
7	Southend United	46	20	12	14	70	53	+17	72	
8	Oxford United	46	20	9	17	65	52	+13	69	
9	Rochdale	46	19	12	15	71	62	+9	69	
10	Bristol Rovers	46	18	12	16	68	70	−2	66	

Source: BBC Sport
Rules for classification: 1) Points; 2) Goal difference; 3) Number of goals scored
(O) Play-off winners; (P) Promoted

==== Results summary ====
Overall								Home						Away					
Pld	W	D	L	GF	GA	GD	Pts	W	D	L	GF	GA	GD	W	D	L	GF	GA	GD
46	20	9	17	65	52	+13	69	11	4	8	33	27	+6	9	5	9	32	25	+7

Last updated: 30 April 2017.
Source: BBC Sport

==== Results by round ====
Round	1	2	3	4	5	6	7	8	9	10	11	12	13	14	15	16	17	18	19	20	21	22	23	24	25	26	27	28	29	30	31	32	33	34	35	36	37	38	39	40	41	42	43	44	45	46
Ground	H	A	A	H	A	H	H	A	H	A	A	H	H	A	A	H	A	H	H	A	H	A	H	H	A	A	A	A	H	H	A	A	H	H	A	A	H	H	A	H	H	A	A	H	A	H
Result	D	L	L	W	L	W	W	D	D	L	W	L	W	L	D	L	L	W	W	D	D	W	L	D	W	L	W	W	W	L	W	W	L	L	W	L	W	L	D	W	L	D	L	W	W	W
Position	13	17	21	19	18	14	11	12	13	16	10	13	10	13	14	17	20	16	14	14	14	10	14	13	12	13	12	13	11	11	10	9	10	11	10	10	9	9	10	8	10	10	10	10	9	8

Updated to match(es) played on 30 April 2017. Source: see below
A = Away; H = Home; W = Win; D = Draw; L = Loss

==== Matches ====
6 August 2016 1	Oxford United	1–1	Chesterfield	Oxford
15:00 BST	Thomas 31'; Ruffles (yellow card) 75'	Report	Raglan (yellow card) 8'; Nolan (yellow card) 73'; Evans 76'	Stadium: Kassam Stadium; Attendance: 8,679 (872 away); Referee: Gavin Ward

14 August 2016 2	Bristol Rovers	2–1	Oxford United	Horfield
15:00 BST	Lines (yellow card) 11'; Easter 25'; Gaffney (yellow card) 29'; Taylor 70'; J.Clarke (yellow card) 76'; O.Clarke (yellow card) 78'	Report	Hemmings 42'; Long (yellow card) 45+3' (yellow-red card) 67'; Martin (yellow card) 55'	Stadium: Memorial Stadium; Attendance: 10,053 (1,283 away); Referee: Charles Breakspear

17 August 2016 3	Fleetwood Town	2–0	Oxford United	Fleetwood
19:45 BST	Ball 50'; Grant (yellow card) 59'; Hunter 70'	Report		Stadium: Highbury Stadium; Attendance: 2,614 (395 away); Referee: David Webb

20 August 2016 4	Oxford United	2–1	Peterborough United	Oxford
15:00 BST	Skarz (yellow card) 37'; Thomas 46'; Maguire (yellow card) 66'; Maguire 90+3' (pen.)	Report	Baldwin (yellow card) 34' (yellow-red card) 90+3'; Forrester (yellow card) 44'; Nichols 62'; Da Silva Lopes (yellow card) 78'	Stadium: Kassam Stadium; Attendance: 7,500 (798 away); Referee: Seb Stockbridge

27 August 2016 5	Sheffield United	2–1	Oxford United	Sheffield
15:00 BST	Basham (yellow card) 1'; Wright (yellow card) 16'; Freeman (yellow card) 52'; Sharp 65'; Wilson 73'	Report	Hemmings 18' (yellow card) 60'; Ruffles (yellow card) 73'	Stadium: Bramall Lane; Attendance: 19,313 (1,278 away); Referee: Nick Kinseley

4 September 2016 6	Oxford United	1–0	Rochdale	Oxford
15:00 BST	Maguire (yellow card) 27'; Raglan (yellow card) 42'; Sercombe 88'	Report	Mendez-Laing (yellow card) 49'	Stadium: Kassam Stadium; Attendance: 6,939 (232 away); Referee: Brendan Malone

10 September 2016 7	Oxford United	2–0	Swindon Town	Oxford
15:00 BST	Thomas (yellow card) 39'; Maguire 44' (pen.), 61'; Lundstram (yellow card) 68'; MacDonald (yellow card) 90+6'	Report	Thomas (yellow card) 34'; Jones (yellow card) 45+2' (yellow-red card) 63'; Vigouroux (yellow card) 56' (yellow-red card) 90+4'; Barry (yellow card) 63'	Stadium: Kassam Stadium; Attendance: 11,042 (1,190 away); Referee: Stuart Attwell

17 September 2016 8	Milton Keynes Dons	0–0	Oxford United	Milton Keynes
15:00 BST		Report	Sercombe (yellow card) 78'	Stadium: Stadium mk Attendance: 12,340 (3,892 away); Referee: Lee Probert

24 September 2016 9	Oxford United	1–1	Charlton Athletic	Oxford
15:00 BST	Edwards (yellow card) 53'; Maguire 67'; Hemmings (yellow card) 90+5'	Report	Lennon (yellow card) 51' (yellow-red card) 90+4'; Jackson 54' (pen.)	Stadium: Kassam Stadium; Attendance: 8,847 (1,476 away); Referee: Keith Stroud

27 September 2016 10	Southend United	2–1	Oxford United	Southend-on-Sea
19:45 BST	Leonard 13'; Wordsworth (yellow card) 40' (goal) 74' (pen.); Mooney (yellow card) 61'; O'Neill (yellow card) 87'; Inniss (yellow card) 90+3'; Oxley (yellow card) 90+6'	Report	Lundstram (yellow card) 44'; Hemmings 45+4'; Maguire (yellow card) 60'; Raglan (yellow card) 84'	Stadium: Roots Hall Stadium; Attendance: 5,593 (440 away); Referee: Graham Horwood

1 October 2016 11	Bolton Wanderers	0–2	Oxford United	Bolton
15:00 BST	Beevers (yellow card) 35'; Trotter (yellow card) 59'; Vela (yellow card) 79'	Report	Lundstram (yellow card) 56'; Thomas 81'; Maguire 90'	Stadium: Macron Stadium; Attendance: 14,207 (1,383 away); Referee: Mark Haywood

9 October 2016 12	Oxford United	1–3	AFC Wimbledon	Oxford
12:15 BST	Charles 49' (o.g.); Dunkley (yellow card) 70'; Johnson (yellow card) 81'	Report	Elliott (yellow card) 10' (goal) 20'; Taylor (yellow card) 13'; Charles 42'; Barcham 45+2'; Shea (yellow card) 59'	Stadium: Kassam Stadium; Attendance: 7,742 (531 away); Referee: Darren Deadman

15 October 2016 13	Oxford United	1–0	Bradford City	Oxford
15:00 BST	Taylor (yellow card) 55'; Maguire 90+1'	Report	Law (yellow card) 28'; Darby (yellow card) 90'	Stadium: Kassam Stadium; Attendance: 8,245 (1,101 away); Referee: David Webb

18 October 2016 14	Coventry City	2–1	Oxford United	Coventry
19:45 BST	Stevenson 28' (yellow card) 55'; Sordell 43'; Sterry (yellow card) 57'	Report	Taylor (yellow card) 37'; Ruffels (yellow card) 90+1'; Crowley 90+2'	Stadium: Ricoh Arena; Attendance: 9,912 (2,137 away); Referee: Robert Jones

22 October 2016 15	Port Vale	2–2	Oxford United	Burslem
15:00 BST	Mac-Intosch (yellow card) 26'; Cicilia 54'; Taylor 59' (pen.)	Report	Dunkley 11' (yellow card) 65'; Crowley 19'; Nelson (yellow card) 58'	Stadium: Vale Park; Attendance: 4,837 (606 away); Referee: Ben Toner

29 October 2016 16	Oxford United	1–2	Millwall	Oxford
15:00 BST	Skarz (yellow card) 26'; Sercombe 31'; Edwards (yellow card) 52'; Rothwell (yellow card) 65'; Maguire (yellow card) 68'	Report	Romeo (yellow card) 9'; Thompson (yellow card) 23'; Morison 36' (yellow card) 90+3'; O'Brien 50'; Ferguson (yellow card) 67'	Stadium: Kassam Stadium; Attendance: 7,944 (934 away); Referee: Roger East

12 November 2016 17	Shrewsbury Town	2–0	Oxford United	Shrewsbury
15:00 GMT	Leitch-Smith 19'; O'Brien (yellow card) 63'; Whalley (yellow card) 89' (goal) 90+8'	Report	Hemmings (yellow card) 21'	Stadium: New Meadow; Attendance: 5,491 (900 away); Referee: Carl Boyeson

19 November 2016 18	Oxford United	4–1	Coventry City	Oxford
15:00 BST	Hemmings 7'; Ledson (yellow card) 30'; Sterry 30' (o.g.); Maguire 36' (pen.); Hall (yellow card) 37'; Skarz (yellow card) 43'; MacDonald 60'	Report	Tudgay 90+5' (pen.)	Stadium: Kassam Stadium; Attendance: 9,199 (1,477 away); Referee: Darren England

22 November 2016 19	Oxford United	1–0	Gillingham	Oxford
19:45 GMT	Johnson 32'; Hemmings (yellow card) 45+2'	Report	Dack (yellow card) 90+1'	Stadium: Kassam Stadium; Attendance: 6,848 (301 away); Referee: Andy Madley

26 November 2016 20	Scunthorpe United	1–1	Oxford United	Scunthorpe
15:00 GMT	Holmes 35' van Veen (yellow card) 89'	Report	Ledson (yellow card) 36'; Dunkley (yellow card) 40'; Edwards 47'; Hall (yellow card) 56'	Stadium: Glanford Park; Attendance: 4,338 (441 away); Referee: Michael Salisbury

10 December 2016 21	Oxford United	1–1	Oldham Athletic	Oxford
15:00 GMT	Johnson (yellow card) 39'; Hall 54' (yellow card) 64'	Report	Burgess 10'; Fané (yellow card) 17' (yellow-red card) 58'; Banks (yellow card) 63'; McLaughlin (yellow card) 78'; Ripley (yellow card) 90+2'	Stadium: Kassam Stadium; Attendance: 7,430 (449 away); Referee: Brett Huxtable

17 December 2016 22	Bury	2–3	Oxford United	Bury
15:00 GMT	Vaughan 5'; Soares (yellow card) 9'; Etuhu (yellow card) 36'; Pope 39' (yellow card) 81'; Bedeau (yellow card) 42'; Kay (yellow card) 86'	Report	Maguire 14', 43' (yellow card) 54'; Hall (yellow card) 20'; Johnson (yellow card) 63'; Leigh 70' (o.g.); MacDonald (yellow card) 82'	Stadium: Gigg Lane; Attendance: 2,986 (477 away); Referee: Darren Drysdale

26 December 2016 23	Oxford United	0–1	Northampton Town	Oxford
15:00 GMT		Report	O'Toole (yellow card) 36'; Revell (yellow card) 45'; Taylor (yellow card) 75'; Phillips (yellow card) 79'; Anderson (yellow card) 87'; Richards 90+4'	Stadium: Kassam Stadium; Attendance: 11,790 (1,128 away); Referee: John Brooks

31 December 2016 24	Oxford United	0–0	Walsall	Oxford
15:00 GMT	Dunkley (yellow card) 40'	Report	Laird (yellow card) 69'	Stadium: Kassam Stadium; Attendance: 8,340 (684 away); Referee: Charles Breakspear

2 January 2017 25	Gillingham	0–1	Oxford United	Gillingham
15:00 GMT	Oshilaja (yellow card) 48' (yellow-red card) 76'; Wagstaff (yellow card) 52'; Ehmer (yellow card) 90+1'	Report	MacDonald (yellow card) 11'; Hall (yellow card) 54'; Dunkley 66'; Roberts (yellow card) 90+4'	Stadium: Priestfield Stadium; Attendance: 6,414 (1,238 away); Referee: Lee Swabey

14 January 2017 26	AFC Wimbledon	2–1	Oxford United	Kingston upon Thames
15:00 GMT	Eastwood 12' (o.g.); Kelly 28' (yellow card) 90+4'; Robinson (yellow card) 43'; Poleon (yellow card) 90+1'	Report	Hall 6'; Taylor (yellow card) 25'; Nelson (yellow card) 46'; Johnson (yellow card) 74'	Stadium: Kingsmeadow Stadium; Attendance: 4,808 (800 away); Referee: Mark Haywood

21 January 2017 27	Rochdale	0–4	Oxford United	Rochdale
15:00 GMT		Report	Taylor (yellow card) 12' (goal) 53'; Johnson 18'; Hall 29'; Ledson 73'	Stadium: Crown Oil Arena; Attendance: 3,246 (489 away); Referee: Robert Jones

5 February 2017 28	Swindon Town	1–2	Oxford United	Swindon
12:00 GMT	Dabo 19' (yellow card) 90+7'; Norris (yellow card) 25'; Jones (yellow card) 32'; Gladwin (yellow card) 45+3'; Vigouroux (red card) 90+3'; Brophy (yellow card) 90+5'	Report	Sercombe 70'; Hall 73' (yellow card) 74'; Edwards (yellow card) 90+4'	Stadium: County Ground; Attendance: 10,658; Referee: Darren Deadman

11 February 2017 29	Oxford United	1–0	Milton Keynes Dons	Oxford
15:00 GMT	Ledson (yellow card) 62'; Dunkley (yellow card) 67'; Hemmings 88'; Maguire (yellow card) 90+5' (penalty missed) 90+6'	Report	Walsh (yellow card) 10'; Barnes (yellow card) 82'; Potter (yellow card) 85' (yellow-red card) 90+5'; Williams (yellow card) 90+1'	Stadium: Kassam Stadium; Attendance: 9,179 (1,350 away); Referee: Trevor Kettle

14 February 2017 30	Oxford United	0–2	Southend United	Oxford
19:45 GMT		Report	Fortuné 62'; Demetriou (yellow card) 77'; Robinson 88'	Stadium: Kassam Stadium; Attendance: 7,277 (472 away); Referee: Darren England

21 February 2017 31	Charlton Athletic	0–1	Oxford United	Charlton, London
19:45 GMT	Forster-Caskey (yellow card) 25'; Crofts (yellow card) 45+1'; Bauer (yellow card) 69'; Solly (red card) 70'; Watt (yellow card) 80'; Holmes (yellow card) 86'	Report	McAleny 12'; Lundstram (yellow card) 45+1'; Johnson (yellow card) 90+5'	Stadium: The Valley; Attendance: 9,109 (699 away); Referee: Gavin Ward

25 February 2017 32	Chesterfield	0–4	Oxford United	Chesterfield
15:00 GMT	Grimshaw (yellow card) 56'; Hird (yellow card) 90'	Report	Hall 17'; McAleny 35' 60' 69'	Stadium: Proact Stadium; Attendance: 5,901 (960 away); Referee: David Webb

4 March 2017 33	Oxford United	0–2	Bristol Rovers	Oxford
15:00 GMT	Dunkley (yellow card) 7'; Ledson (yellow card) 59'; Martínez (yellow card) 84'	Report	Clarke 16' (yellow card) 45+2'; Sinclair 36'; Brown (yellow card) 74'; Lumley (yellow card) 85'	Stadium: Kassam Stadium; Attendance: 9,862 (1,798 away); Referee: Carl Boyeson

7 March 2017 34	Oxford United	2–3	Sheffield United	Oxford
19:45 GMT	Dunkley 22'; Ledson (yellow card) 37'; Nelson (yellow card) 76'; Martínez 90+2'	Report	Wright (yellow card) 16'; Sharp 55' 76' (pen.) (yellow card) 81'; Freeman 72'; Coutts (yellow card) 74'	Stadium: Kassam Stadium; Attendance: 8,965 (1,667 away); Referee: Paul Tierney

11 March 2017 35	Peterborough United	1–2	Oxford United	Peterborough
15:00 GMT	Taylor (yellow card) 65'; Da Silva Lopes (yellow card) 67' (yellow-red card) 85'; Mackail-Smith 90+1'	Report	Edwards 23'; McAleny (yellow card) 45' (goal) 71'; Ledson (yellow card) 87'	Stadium: London Road Stadium; Attendance: 5,469 (1,130 away); Referee: Mark Heywood

14 March 2017 36	Oldham Athletic	2–1	Oxford United	Oldham
19:45 GMT	Erwin 36' 70'	Report	Chris Maguire 60' (pen.)	Stadium: Boundary Park; Attendance: 3,124 (383 away); Referee: Darren Drysdale

18 March 2017 37	Oxford United	2–1	Scunthorpe United	Oxford
15:00 BST	Lundstram 52'; Nelson 90+1'	Report	Madden 12'	Stadium: Kassam Stadium; Attendance: 7,652 (394 away); Referee: Tim Robinson

21 March 2017 38	Oxford United	2–4	Bolton Wanderers	Oxford
19:45 GMT	Hemmings 42'; Maguire 75'; McAleny (yellow card) 77'	Report	Morais 4'; Beevers 23' (yellow card) 89'; Dunkley 60' (o.g.); Vela 90+4'	Stadium: Kassam Stadium; Attendance: 7,146 (575 away); Referee: Ross Joyce

25 March 2017 39	Northampton Town	0–0	Oxford United	Northampton
15:00 GMT	Taylor (penalty missed)	Report		Stadium: Sixfields Stadium; Attendance: 7,434 (1,399 away); Referee: Mike Jones

28 March 2017 40	Oxford United	5–1	Bury	Oxford
19:45 BST	Johnson 11'; Rothwell 35'; McAleny 39', 49', 90+4'; Dunkley (yellow card) 86'	Report	Lowe (yellow card) 42'; Vaughan 59'; Mellis (yellow card) 80'	Stadium: Kassam Stadium; Attendance: 6,552 (185 away); Referee: Andy Haines

5 April 2017 41	Oxford United	1–3	Fleetwood Town	Oxford
19:45 BST	Nelson 8'; Maguire (yellow card) 56'	Report	Grant 6' (pen.); Dempsey (yellow card) 12'; Hunter (yellow card) 38'; Bolger (yellow card) 51'; Eastham 75'; Bell (yellow card) 80'; Ball 87'	Stadium: Kassam Stadium; Attendance: 6,728 (83 away); Referee: Graham Horwood

8 April 2017 42	Walsall	1–1	Oxford United	Walsall
15:00 BST	McCarthy (yellow card) 35'; Makris 48'	Report	Carroll (yellow card) 38'; Maguire 74'	Stadium: Bescot Stadium; Attendance: 5,417 (1,146 away); Referee: Darren Handley

14 April 2017 43	Bradford City	1–0	Oxford United	Bradford
15:00 BST	Law 61'	Report	Skarz (yellow card) 54'; Raglan (yellow card) 90+4'	Stadium: Valley Parade; Attendance: 19,346 (577 away); Referee: Richard Clark

17 April 2017 44	Oxford United	2–0	Port Vale	Oxford
15:00 BST	Ruffles 14'; Maguire 82'	Report	Streete (yellow card) 40'	Stadium: Kassam Stadium; Attendance: 7,646 (351 away); Referee: Trevor Kettle

22 April 2017 45	Millwall	0–3	Oxford United	Millwall
15:00 BST	Craig (yellow card) 29'	Report	McAleny 6' 9'; Ruffels 71'	Stadium: The Den; Attendance: 12,533 (630 away); Referee: Dean Whitestone

30 April 2017 46	Oxford United	2–0	Shrewsbury Town	Oxford
12:00 BST	Nelson 16'; Hall 17'	Report	Payne (yellow card) 45+4'	Stadium: Kassam Stadium; Attendance: 9,287 (897 away); Referee: Kevin Johnson

=== FA Cup ===
5 November 2016 First round	Merstham	0–5	Oxford United	Merstham
12:30 GMT	Okoye (yellow card) 25'; Vidal (yellow card) 38'; Hall (yellow card) 53'	Report	MacDonald 12' (yellow card) 29'; Ruffels 45'; Hemmings 62', 90'; Roberts 63'	Stadium: Moatside Stadium; Attendance: 1,920; Referee: John Brooks

2 December 2016 Second round	Macclesfield Town	0–0	Oxford United	Macclesfield
19:55 GMT	Hancox (yellow card) 77'	Report	Dunkley (yellow card) 11'; Johnson (yellow card) 60'	Stadium: Moss Rose Ground; Attendance: 2,566 (314 away); Referee: Seb Stockbridge

13 December 2016 Second round replay	Oxford United	3–0	Macclesfield Town	Oxford
19:45 GMT	Taylor 10'; Rothwell 47'; Hemmings 78'	Report	Hancox (yellow card) 23' (yellow-red card) 44'	Stadium: Kassam Stadium; Attendance: 3,642 (237 away); Referee: Carl Boyeson

7 January 2017 Third round	Rotherham United	2–3	Oxford United	Rotherham
15:00	Broadfoot (yellow card) 35'; Fisher (yellow card) 37'; Ward 51'; Adeyemi 90'	Report	Maguire (penalty missed) 36'; Taylor 41'; Edwards 80'; Hemmings 88'	Stadium: AESSEAL New York Stadium; Attendance: 5,618 (1,292 away); Referee: Darren Bond

27 January 2017 Fourth round	Oxford United	3–0	Newcastle United	Oxford
15:00	Hemmings 46' (yellow card) 57'; Edwards (yellow card) 66'; Nelson 79'; Martínez 87'	Report	Mitrovic (penalty missed) 66'; Hanley (yellow card) 90+1'	Stadium: Kassam Stadium; Attendance: 11,810 (1,787 away); Referee: David Coote

18 February 2017 Fifth round	Middlesbrough	3–2	Oxford United	Middlesbrough
15:00	Leadbitter 26' (pen.); Gestede 34'; Ayala (yellow card) 62'; Chambers (yellow card) 71'; Stuani 86'; Negredo (yellow card) 90+2'	Report	Maguire 64'; Martínez 65'; Ledson (yellow card) 76'; Johnson (yellow card) 90+4'	Stadium: Riverside Stadium; Attendance: 28,198 (3,376 away); Referee: Andre Marriner

=== EFL Cup ===
9 August 2016 First round	Birmingham City	0–1 (a.e.t.)	Oxford United	Birmingham
19:45 BST	Storer (yellow card) 52'	Report	Taylor (yellow card) 35'; Lundstram (yellow card) 72'; Crowley (yellow card) 93'; Skarz (yellow card) 104'; Sercombe 120'	Stadium: St Andrew's; Attendance: 7,202 (1,155 away); Referee: Darren Handley

23 August 2016 Second round	Oxford United	2–4	Brighton & Hove Albion	Oxford
19:45 BST	Thomas 28'; Crowley 90+4'	Report	Adekugbe 2'; Hünemeier (yellow card) 41'; Holla (yellow card) 45+1'; LuaLua 76'; Manu 81'; Adekugbe (yellow card) 85'; Hemed 85'	Stadium: Kassam Stadium; Attendance: 3,189 (677 away); Referee: Andy Davies

=== EFL Trophy ===
Pos	Div	Team	Pld	W	PW	PL	L	GF	GA	GD	Pts	Qualification
1	L1	Swindon Town	3	1	2	0	0	3	2	+1	7	Advance to Round 2
2	L1	Oxford United	3	1	0	2	0	5	3	+2	5	Advance to Round 2
3	L2	Exeter City	3	1	0	1	1	6	7	−1	4	
4	ACA	Chelsea U21	3	0	1	0	2	4	6	−2	2	

Source: Sky Sports

30 August 2016 Group stage 1	Oxford United	4–2	Exeter City	Oxford
19:45 BST	Roberts 12'; Maguire 36' (pen.); Taylor 68'; MacDonald 71'	Report	Jay 43'; McAlinden 61'	Stadium: Kassam Stadium; Attendance: 1,575 (98 away); Referee: James Adcock

4 October 2016 Group stage 2	Swindon Town	0–0 (3–1 p)	Oxford United	Swindon
19:45 BST	Iandolo (yellow card) 18'; Thomas (yellow card) 39'; Goddard (yellow card) 90+3'	Report	Edwards (yellow card) 24'; MacDonald (red card) 37'; Rothwell (yellow card) 40'; Skarz (yellow card) 48'; Crowley (yellow card) 68'	Stadium: County Ground; Attendance: 2,698 (533 away); Referee: Paul Tierney
	Penalties
	Goddard (penalty scored); Murray (penalty missed); Norris (penalty missed); Thomas (penalty scored); Furlong (penalty scored)		Sercombe (penalty missed); Taylor (penalty scored); Thomas (penalty missed); Ruffels (penalty missed)

8 November 2016 Group stage 3	Chelsea U23	1–1 (13–12 p)	Oxford United	Fulham, London
19:30 GMT	Quintero 44'	Report	Hemmings 90+4'	Stadium: Stamford Bridge; Attendance: 5,200 (624 away); Referee: Dean Whitestone
	Penalties
	Ugbo (penalty scored); Aina (penalty scored); Dabo (penalty scored) van Ginkel (penalty missed); Zouma (penalty scored); Collins (penalty missed); Ali (penalty scored); Maddox (penalty scored); Quintero (penalty scored); Grant (penalty missed); Colley (penalty scored); Ugbo (penalty scored); Aina (penalty missed); Dabo (penalty scored) van Ginkel (penalty scored); Zouma (penalty scored); Collins (penalty scored)		Maguire (penalty scored); Lundstram (penalty missed); Hemmings (penalty scored); Rothwell (penalty scored); Johnson (penalty scored); Thomas (penalty missed); Skarz (penalty scored); Edwards (penalty scored); Nelson (penalty scored); Martin (penalty missed); Eastwood (penalty scored); Maguire (penalty scored); Lundstram (penalty missed); Hemmings (penalty scored); Rothwell (penalty scored); Johnson (penalty scored); Thomas (penalty missed)

6 December 2016 Second round	Southend United	1–1 (3–4 p)	Oxford United	Southend-on-Sea
19:45 GMT	Timlin (yellow card) 76'; Wordsworth 86'	Report	Ruffels (yellow card) 28'; Taylor (yellow card) 78'; Maguire 81'	Stadium: Roots Hall Stadium; Attendance: 2,004 (88 away); Referee: Trevor Kettle
	Penalties
	Cox (penalty missed); Demetriou (penalty scored); Wordsworth (penalty scored); Leonard (penalty scored); McLaughlin (penalty missed)		Maguire (penalty scored); Hemmings (penalty scored); Edwards (penalty scored); Johnson (penalty missed); Roberts (penalty scored)

10 January 2017 Third round	Oxford United	4–1	Scunthorpe United	Oxford
19:45 GMT	Johnson 19'; Hemmings 23', 50' (pen.), 90+3'; Skarz (yellow card) 43'	Report	Williams 11' (pen.); Clarke (yellow card) 36'; Sutton (yellow card) 49'	Stadium: Kassam Stadium; Attendance: 1,383 (90 away); Referee: Gavin Ward

31 January 2017 Quarter-final	Oxford United	2–1	Bradford City	Oxford
19:45 GMT	Maguire 53' (pen.); Johnson 55' (yellow card) 90+1'; Hall (yellow card) 84'	Report	Hiwula (yellow card) 84'; Vincelot 85'	Stadium: Kassam Stadium; Attendance: 2,274 (159 away); Referee: D. Whitestone

1 March 2017 Semi-final	Luton Town	2–3	Oxford United	Luton
19:45 GMT	Rea (yellow card) 22'; Vassell 72'; Hylton 83'; Mullins (yellow card) 90'	Report	Edwards 10' (yellow card) 34'; Ruddock 69' (o.g.); Johnson 85'	Stadium: Kenilworth Road; Attendance: 6,901 (742 away); Referee: Nigel Miller

2 April 2017 Final	Coventry City	2–1	Oxford United	Wembley
14:30 BST	Bigirimana 11' (yellow card) 39'; G. Thomas 55'	Report	Nelson (yellow card) 63'; Sercombe 75' (yellow card) 86'	Stadium: Wembley Stadium; Attendance: 74,434; Referee: Chris Sarginson

=== Oxfordshire Senior Cup ===
1	Bye

2	Bye

3	Bye

4	Bye

8 February 2017 QF	Kidlington	1–5	Oxford United	Yarnton Road Stadium, Kidlington
19:45	Coyle 31' (pen.)	Report	Hemmings 17' 68'; McAleny 44'; Roberts	Attendance: 233

4 April 2017 SF	Oxford United	3–2 (a.e.t.)	Banbury United	Marston
19:45 GMT	Graham 68' 120'; C Hawtin 90'	Report	McDonagh 74'; Duku 83'	Stadium: Court Place Farm; Attendance: 248

25 April 2017 Final	Oxford United	1–2	North Leigh	Thame
19:45 GMT	Heap 86'	Report	James 20' 57'	Stadium: ASM Stadium; Referee: E Turner

== Squad statistics ==
=== Appearances and goals ===
As of 30 April 2017

No.	Pos	Nat	Player	Total		League One		FA Cup		League Cup		FL Trophy	
No.	Pos	Nat	Player	Apps	Goals	Apps	Goals	Apps	Goals	Apps	Goals	Apps	Goals
1	GK	(England) ENG	Simon Eastwood	62	0	46	0	6	0	2	0	8	0
2	DF	(Wales) WAL	Christian Ribeiro	3	0	3	0	0	0	0	0	0	0
3	DF	(England) ENG	Joe Skarz	38	0	28+2	0	2	0	2	0	4	0
4	MF	(England) ENG	John Lundstram	57	1	44+1	1	3	0	2	0	5+2	0
5	DF	(England) ENG	Curtis Nelson	43	4	33	3	4	1	1	0	5	0
6	DF	(England) ENG	Aaron Martin	11	0	2+2	0	3	0	1	0	3	0
7	MF	(England) ENG	Dan Crowley	11	3	2+4	2	0	0	0+2	1	3	0
7	FW	(Spain) ESP	Toni Martínez	17	3	8+7	1	1+1	2	0	0	0	0
8	MF	(England) ENG	Liam Sercombe	44	5	25+6	3	1+3	0	1+1	1	4+3	1
9	FW	(England) ENG	Wes Thomas	17	4	8+5	3	0	0	2	1	0+2	0
10	FW	(Scotland) SCO	Chris Maguire	54	17	40+2	13	4	1	1	0	6+1	3
11	MF	(Scotland) SCO	Alex MacDonald	31	3	18+5	1	4	1	1+1	0	1+1	1
11	FW	(England) ENG	Conor McAleny	19	10	14+4	10	0+1	0	0	0	0	0
13	GK	(Liechtenstein) LIE	Benjamin Büchel	0	0	0	0	0	0	0	0	0	0
14	MF	(England) ENG	Josh Ruffels	30	3	14+6	2	2+1	1	1	0	6	0
15	FW	(England) ENG	Kane Hemmings	53	15	22+17	6	3+3	5	1+1	0	5+1	4
16	DF	(England) ENG	Phil Edwards	52	4	37+2	2	5	1	0	0	8	1
17	MF	(England) ENG	Jonny Giles	0	0	0	0	0	0	0	0	0	0
18	MF	(England) ENG	Joe Rothwell	44	2	19+13	1	2+2	1	1	0	6+1	0
19	FW	(England) ENG	Robert Hall	35	6	21+5	6	4	0	0	0	5	0
20	FW	(England) ENG	Ryan Taylor	31	4	9+12	1	3+1	2	1+1	0	4	1
21	FW	(Wales) WAL	Tyler Roberts	22	2	0+14	0	3	1	1+1	0	2+1	1
22	DF	(England) ENG	Sam Long	7	0	2+1	0	0	0	2	0	2	0
23	MF	(England) ENG	Ryan Ledson	29	1	20+2	1	4	0	0	0	2+1	0
24	MF	(England) ENG	Josh Ashby	0	0	0	0	0	0	0	0	0	0
25	DF	(England) ENG	Charlie Raglan	16	0	16	0	0	0	0	0	0	0
28	MF	(England) ENG	Marvin Johnson	52	6	33+6	3	6	0	0	0	5+2	3
33	DF	(England) ENG	Chey Dunkley	51	3	40	3	5	0	1	0	5	0
35	DF	(Republic of Ireland) IRL	Canice Carroll	7	0	3+1	0	0+1	0	0	0	0+2	0
36	DF	(England) ENG	Miles Welch-Hayes	1	0	1	0	0	0	0	0	0	0
37	FW	(England) ENG	George Jeacock	0	0	0	0	0	0	0	0	0	0

=== Top scorers ===
As of 30 April 2017

Place	Position	Nation	Number	Name	League One	FA Cup	League Cup	FL Trophy	Total
1	FW	(Scotland)	10	Chris Maguire	13	1	0	3	17
2	FW	(England)	15	Kane Hemmings	6	5	0	4	15
3	FW	(England)	11	Conor McAleny	10	0	0	0	10
4	FW	(England)	19	Robert Hall	6	0	0	0	6
4	MF	(England)	28	Marvin Johnson	3	0	0	3	6
6	MF	(England)	8	Liam Sercombe	3	0	1	1	5
7	DF	(England)	5	Curtis Nelson	3	1	0	0	4
7	FW	(England)	9	Wes Thomas	3	0	1	0	4
7	DF	(England)	16	Phil Edwards	2	1	0	1	4
7	FW	(England)	20	Ryan Taylor	1	2	0	1	4
7	Own goal				3	0	0	1	4
12	MF	(England)	7	Dan Crowley	2	0	1	0	3
12	FW	(Spain)	7	Toni Martínez	1	2	0	0	3
12	MF	(Scotland)	11	Alex MacDonald	1	1	0	1	3
12	MF	(England)	14	Josh Ruffels	2	1	0	0	3
12	DF	(England)	33	Chey Dunkley	3	0	0	0	3
17	MF	(England)	18	Joe Rothwell	1	1	0	0	2
17	FW	(Wales)	21	Tyler Roberts	0	1	0	1	2
19	MF	(England)	4	John Lundstram	1	0	0	0	1
19	MF	(England)	23	Ryan Ledson	1	0	0	0	1
TOTALS					62	16	3	16	100

=== Disciplinary record ===
As of 30 April 2017

Number	Nation	Position	Name	League Two		FA Cup		League Cup		FL Trophy		Total	
Number	Nation	Position	Name	Yellow card	Red card	Yellow card	Red card	Yellow card	Red card	Yellow card	Red card	Yellow card	Red card
1	(England)	GK	Simon Eastwood	1	0	0	0	0	0	0	0	1	0
3	(England)	DF	Joe Skarz	4	0	0	0	1	0	2	0	7	0
4	(England)	MF	John Lundstram	5	0	0	0	1	0	0	0	6	0
5	(England)	DF	Curtis Nelson	4	0	0	0	0	0	0	0	4	0
6	(England)	DF	Aaron Martin	1	0	0	0	0	0	0	0	1	0
7	(England)	MF	Dan Crowley	0	0	0	0	1	0	1	0	2	0
7	(Spain)	FW	Toni Martínez	2	0	0	0	0	0	0	0	2	0
8	(England)	MF	Liam Sercombe	2	0	0	0	0	0	1	0	3	0
9	(England)	FW	Wes Thomas	1	0	0	0	0	0	0	0	1	0
10	(Scotland)	FW	Chris Maguire	7	0	0	0	0	0	0	0	7	0
11	(Scotland)	MF	Alex MacDonald	3	0	1	0	0	0	0	1	4	1
11	(England)	FW	Conor McAleny	2	0	0	0	0	0	0	0	2	0
14	(England)	MF	Josh Ruffels	3	0	0	0	0	0	1	0	4	0
15	(England)	FW	Kane Hemmings	4	0	1	0	0	0	0	0	5	0
16	(England)	DF	Phil Edwards	3	0	1	0	0	0	2	0	6	0
18	(England)	MF	Joe Rothwell	1	0	0	0	0	0	1	0	2	0
19	(England)	MF	Robert Hall	6	0	0	0	0	0	1	0	7	0
20	(England)	FW	Ryan Taylor	4	0	0	0	1	0	1	0	6	0
21	(Wales)	FW	Tyler Roberts	1	0	0	0	0	0	0	0	1	0
22	(England)	DF	Sam Long	0	1	0	0	0	0	0	0	0	1
23	(England)	MF	Ryan Ledson	6	0	1	0	0	0	0	0	7	0
25	(England)	DF	Charlie Raglan	3	0	0	0	0	0	0	0	3	0
28	(England)	MF	Marvin Johnson	5	0	2	0	0	0	1	0	8	0
33	(England)	DF	Chey Dunkley	7	0	1	0	0	0	1	0	9	0
35	(England)	DF	Canice Carroll	1	0	0	0	0	0	0	0	1	0
TOTALS				76	1	7	0	4	0	12	1	99	2
