= Ryan Ledson =

English footballer (born 1997)

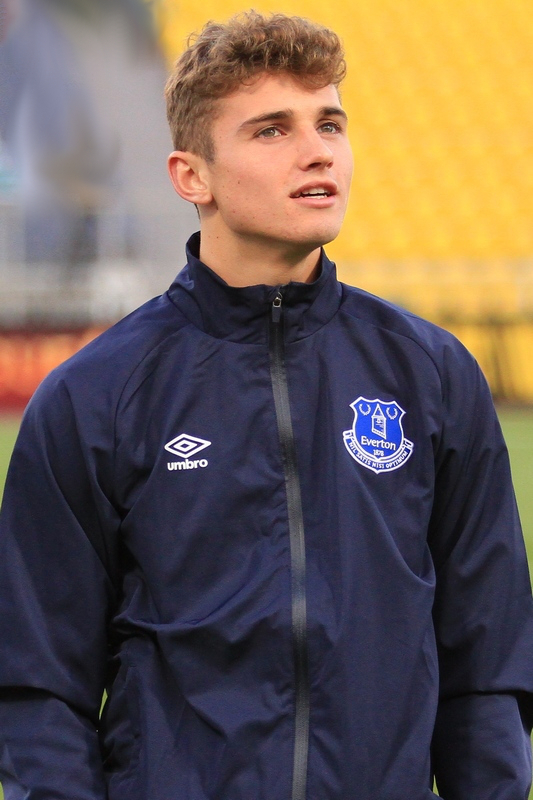
- Ledson with Everton in 2014

Personal information
- Full name: Ryan Graham Ledson
- Date of birth: 19 August 1997 (age 29)
- Place of birth: Liverpool, England
- Height: 5 ft 9 in (1.75 m)
- Position: Midfielder

Team information
- Current team: Huddersfield Town
- Number: 4

Youth career
- 2002–2014: Everton

Senior career*
Years	Team	Apps	(Gls)
2014–2016	Everton	0	(0)
2015–2016	→ Cambridge United (loan)	27	(0)
2016–2018	Oxford United	66	(4)
2018–2025	Preston North End	191	(4)
2025–	Huddersfield Town	43	(7)

International career
2012–2013	England U16	7	(0)
2013–2014	England U17	16	(2)
2014–2015	England U18	5	(1)
2015–2016	England U19	7	(1)
2016–2017	England U20	3	(0)
- * Club domestic league appearances and goals as of 1 May 2026 (UTC)

Ryan Graham Ledson (born 19 August 1997) is an English professional footballer who plays as a midfielder for EFL League One club Huddersfield Town, whom he captains.

== Club career ==
=== Everton ===
Ledson joined Everton's academy at the age of five. After progressing through the ranks at the Everton Academy, he made his debut for the club's under-21 team under Alan Stubbs, in a 0–0 draw against Chelsea on 25 April 2013. At the end of the 2012–13 season, he signed a scholarship with the club.

The following season, 2013–14, Ledson continued to play for the under-21 side and scored once against Liverpool U21 on 14 April 2014. He appeared in the first-team squad as an unused substitute on two occasions, against Southampton and Manchester City, later in the season. At the end of the 2013–14 season, he was awarded Academy Player of the Season and the prestigious Keith Tamlin Award at the club's Academy ceremony.

On his 17th birthday, Ledson signed his first professional deal with the club, for three years, keeping him until 2017. After being an unused substitute against West Ham United on 22 November 2014, he made his first-team debut on 11 December 2014, starting in a UEFA Europa League game against FC Krasnodar at Goodison Park. Everton, who had already advanced into the next round, lost 0–1. This turned out to be his only appearance in the Everton first team. He scored for the U21 side on 9 March 2015, in a 2–1 win over against rivals Liverpool U21. During his time at Everton, Ledson was compared to Frank Lampard by local newspaper the Liverpool Echo, which described him as "an aggressive, ball-playing central midfielder" who "lists tackling and passing as his key strengths".

=== Loan spell at Cambridge United ===
Despite playing for the reserves in the first half of the season, Ledson expressed his desire to leave the club on loan for first-team experience. On 20 November 2015 he signed on loan for Cambridge United, initially until 3 January 2016 and later extended until April 2016.

He made his league debut on 21 November, playing the entirety of a 2–3 loss to Accrington Stanley at the Abbey Stadium in League Two. After making his debut for the club, Ledson quickly established himself in the starting eleven. His loan spell at the club was extended three times, eventually to the end of the season. Ledson made a total of 28 appearances for Cambridge and returned to his parent club at the end of the season.

=== Oxford United ===
His lack of first-team football at Everton continued in the 2016–17 season, and on 25 August 2016 Ledson signed a three-year contract with Oxford United of League One for an undisclosed fee. Ledson was linked with a move to Portsmouth before moving to Oxford United.

Ledson made his first-team debut as a late substitute in Oxford United's 2–0 home victory over local rivals Swindon Town on 10 September 2016. However, he injured his knee while warming up during a 2–1 loss against Southend United and was sidelined for a month. After recovering from injury in early November, he returned to the first team, starting in a 5–0 win over Merstham in the first round of the FA Cup. He gradually established himself in midfield, and scored his first senior goal in a 4–0 away victory over Rochdale on 21 January 2017, firing into an empty net from at least 35 yards after intercepting a misplaced free kick. He was named the EFL Young Player of the Month for February 2017. Shortly afterwards, he was shortlisted for the Young Player of the Year award but lost out to Exeter City's Ollie Watkins. Ledson also played in the EFL Trophy Final and started the match before coming off in the 57th minutes for Liam Sercombe, who scored the club's only goal in the game, in a 2–1 loss against Coventry City on 2 April 2017. Later in the 2016–17 season, he found himself out of the first team, due to international commitments and injury. Despite this, Ledson finished his first season at the club having made 30 appearances and scoring once in all competitions.

Ahead of the 2017–18 season, Ledson switched number shirt from 23 to 8. After returning from injury, he regained his first-team place in central midfield. He then scored his first goal of the season, converting successfully from a penalty, in a 2–1 loss against Walsall on 23 September 2017. After an error that allowed Chris Long to score in a 2–1 loss against Northampton Town on 11 November 2017, he made amends for his mistake seven days later when he scored in a 4–0 win over Plymouth Argyle. During January, Ledson remained the subject of transfer speculation, with clubs such as Preston North End said to be interested. Amid the transfer speculation, Ledson scored his third goal of the season, in a 3–2 win over Charlton Athletic on 3 February 2018. Ledson was voted the Supporters' Player of the Year at the club's end-of-season awards dinner, as well as picking up the awards for Young Player of the Year and Goal of the Season.

=== Preston North End ===
Ledson joined Preston North End in May 2018 for an undisclosed fee. He made his debut for the club on 4 August 2018, in a 1–0 win against Queens Park Rangers. He scored his first goal for the club on 7 November 2020, in a 2–1 defeat against Rotherham United.

Ledson was named as the Players and Supporters Player of the Year for the 2020–21 season.

Ryan Ledson signed a new contract for Preston North End in December 2022 until the end of the 2024-25 season.

=== Huddersfield Town ===
On 30 May 2025, Ledson joined League One side Huddersfield Town on a free transfer upon the expiry of his contract at Preston North End. He made his debut for the club on 2 August 2025, in a 3–0 win against Leyton Orient.

== International career ==
Ledson has been capped by England at under-16, under-17, under-18, under-19 and under-20 levels.

Ledson made his debut for the under-16 side on 29 November 2012, playing 67 minutes before being substituted, in a 1–0 against Scotland U16. Ledson captained on two occasions, as he went on to make 7 appearances for the U16 side.

On joining the under-17 side, Ledson scored on his debut, in a 2–1 defeat to Italy U17 on 1 September 2013. He captained the under–17 side on several occasions and subsequently helped them qualify for the UEFA European Under-17 tournament. In May 2014, he was part of the squad that won the 2014 UEFA European Under-17 Championship, captaining the team in the process and also being named in UEFA's team of the tournament. After the tournament, Ledson described it as 'unbeatable'.

In August 2014, Ledson was called up to the under-18 side. He appeared twice as captain against Netherlands U18, both matches ending in victory. He scored his first England U18 goal in 4–1 win over Poland U18 on 17 November 2014, having played against them two days earlier. He went on to make five appearances for the U18 side.

In November 2015, Ledson was called up by the under-19 side for the first time. He scored on his England U19 debut on 12 November 2015, in a 2–2 draw against Netherlands U19 and continued to impress in a follow-up against Japan U19. He featured in the UEFA European Under-19 Championship squad. Ledson made 7 appearances in total, scoring once, for the U19 side.

Ledson joined the under-20 side in late August 2016. He made his England U20 debut on 1 September 2016, in a 1–1 draw against Brazil U20, and scored on his second appearance, in a 2–1 defeat three days later. An injury sustained at Oxford United meant he missed the 2017 FIFA U-20 World Cup in South Korea, in which his England side were the eventual winners.

== Personal life ==
Ledson has been in a relationship with Coronation Street actress Lucy Fallon since 2020. Having suffered a miscarriage in March 2022, Fallon fell pregnant again later that year, giving birth to their son on 30 January 2023. The couple welcomed a second child, a daughter, on 11 January 2025.

== Career statistics ==
As of match played 27 September 2025

Appearances and goals by club, season and competition
Club	Season	League			FA Cup		League Cup		Other		Total	
Club	Season	Division	Apps	Goals	Apps	Goals	Apps	Goals	Apps	Goals	Apps	Goals
Everton	2014–15	Premier League	0	0	0	0	0	0	1 (Note: Appearance in the Europa League)	0	1	0
Everton	2015–16	Premier League	0	0	0	0	0	0	—		0	0
Everton	Total		0	0	0	0	0	0	1	0	1	0
Cambridge United (loan)	2015–16	League Two	27	0	1	0	0	0	—		28	0
Oxford United	2016–17	League One	22	1	5	0	0	0	3 (Note: Appearances in the EFL Trophy)	0	30	1
Oxford United	2017–18	League One	44	3	1	0	1	0	4	0	50	3
Oxford United	Total		66	4	6	0	1	0	7	0	80	4
Preston North End	2018–19	Championship	24	0	1	0	3	0	—		28	1
Preston North End	2019–20	Championship	13	0	1	0	3	0	—		17	0
Preston North End	2020–21	Championship	36	2	1	0	1	0	—		38	2
Preston North End	2021–22	Championship	25	0	1	0	2	1	—		28	1
Preston North End	2022–23	Championship	40	1	2	0	1	0	—		43	1
Preston North End	2023–24	Championship	27	0	1	0	1	0	—		29	0
Preston North End	2024–25	Championship	26	1	2	0	4	2	—		32	3
Preston North End	Total		191	4	9	0	15	3	0	0	215	7
Huddersfield Town	2025–26	League One	10	0	0	0	0	0	0	0	10	0
Career total			294	8	16	0	16	3	8	0	334	11

== Honours ==
Oxford United

- EFL Trophy runner-up: 2016–17

England U17

- UEFA European U-17 Championship: 2014

Individual

- Preston North End Player of the Year: 2020–21
- UEFA European U-17 Championship Team of the Tournament (1): 2014
