= 2017 EFL Trophy final =

English football match between Coventry City and Oxford United

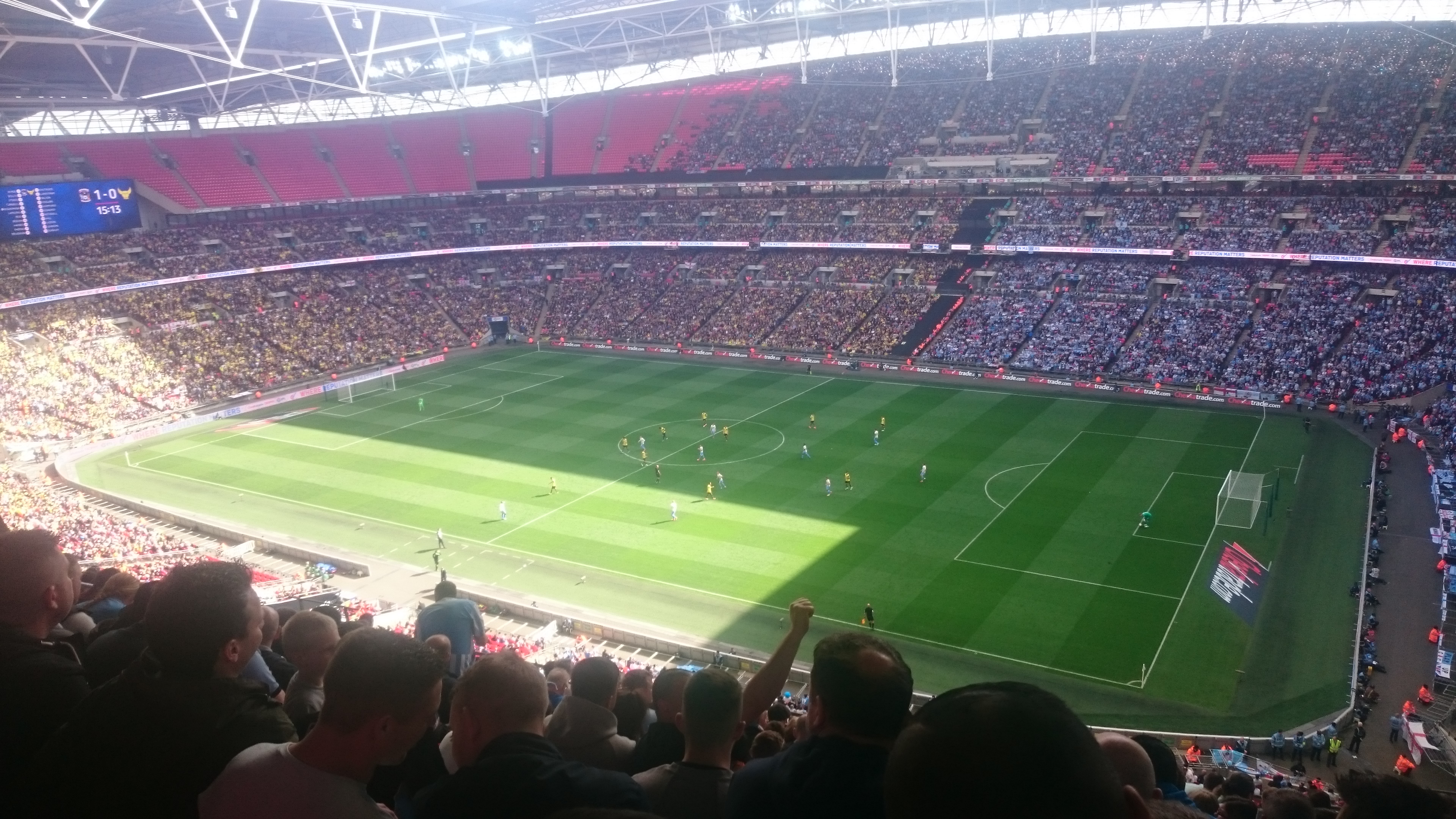
- View of Wembley Stadium during the final
- Event: 2016–17 EFL Trophy
Coventry City	Oxford United
2	1
- Date: 2 April 2017
- Venue: Wembley Stadium, London
- Man of the Match: George Thomas (Coventry City)
- Referee: Chris Sarginson
- Attendance: 74,434
- Weather: Sunny

The 2017 EFL Trophy final was an association football match that was played on 2 April 2017 at Wembley Stadium, London. It was played between League One teams Coventry City and Oxford United. The match decided the winners of the 2016–17 EFL Trophy, a 64-team knockout tournament comprising clubs from League One and League Two of the English Football League (EFL), as well as 16 Category One academy sides representing Premier League and Championship clubs. It was Coventry's first appearance in the final and the second for Oxford, who were beaten by Barnsley in the previous season's match.

The game was played on a sunny day in front of a crowd of 74,434, the highest attendance for the final since the opening of the new Wembley Stadium. The referee was Chris Sarginson. Oxford dominated possession in the first half, but lacked sufficient potency in attack. It was Coventry who led at half time, scoring through Gaël Bigirimana after 11 minutes with the first meaningful chance of the game. Ten minutes into the second half, George Thomas made it 2–0 to Coventry with a low volley from the edge of the penalty area. Liam Sercombe pulled a goal back for Oxford 15 minutes before the end, but despite a series of shots on goal in a last-minute attack, they were unable to equalise and Coventry won 2–1 to earn their first major trophy since their victory in the 1987 FA Cup final.

The win was a highlight for Coventry's supporters in what was otherwise a disappointing season, as they were relegated to League Two. Oxford were challenging for a play-off place in the league at the time of the final but were unsuccessful, finishing in eighth place. At the end of the season, representatives from League One and League Two clubs voted to continue with the 64-team format for the following two seasons. This decision was supported by Coventry manager Mark Robins but opposed by his opposite number Michael Appleton, who stated a preference for reverting to the format involving just League One and League Two clubs.

== Background ==
The EFL Trophy was inaugurated as the Associate Members' Cup in the 1983–84 season and followed on from the short-lived Football League Group Cup. The competition was renamed to the Football League Trophy in 1992, and to the EFL Trophy in 2016, coinciding with the Football League rebranding to the English Football League (EFL). It is open to all 48 clubs in EFL League One and EFL League Two, the third and fourth tiers of the English football league system and, starting with the 2016–17 season, 16 Category One academy teams, representing clubs from the Premier League and Championship. The tournament originally used a straight knockout format, but was modified in 2016–17 to incorporate an initial group stage, in which a team is awarded three points for a win and zero for a defeat. In the event of a draw, a penalty shoot-out is held at the end of the game with the winner of the shoot-out receiving two points and the loser one. In the 2016–17 season it was referred to by its sponsorship name, the Checkatrade Trophy. The 2016–17 tournament was the 34th edition of the competition.

Coventry City and Oxford United both appeared in the competition as a result of their membership of League One for the 2016–17 season. Coventry were making their first appearance in a League Trophy final while for Oxford it was their second, following a 3–2 defeat to Barnsley in the previous season's match. Both teams had won a major Wembley cup final during the 1980s – Oxford beat Queens Park Rangers in the 1986 Football League Cup final, and Coventry won the following season's FA Cup final against Tottenham Hotspur. The two sides had won one game each of the head-to-head league meetings that season. At Coventry's Ricoh Arena, in October 2016, Coventry won 2–1 with goals from Ben Stevenson and Marvin Sordell and a late consolation for Oxford by Dan Crowley. The return fixture at the Kassam Stadium a month later was won by Oxford with Kane Hemmings, Jamie Sterry, Chris Maguire and Alex MacDonald all scoring as the match finished 4–1.

== Route to the final ==
=== Coventry City ===
Group stage		Result
1	West Ham United academy (H)	4–2
2	Northampton Town (H)	3–1
3	Wycombe Wanderers (A)	4–2

Southern Group D table
Pos	Team	Pld	Pts
1	Coventry City (Q)	3	9
2	Wycombe Wanderers (Q)	3	6
3	West Ham United academy	3	2
4	Northampton Town	3	1

Knockout phase		Result
2R	Crawley Town (H)	1–0
3R	Brighton & Hove Albion academy (H)	3–0
QF	Swansea City academy (A)	1–1 (4–2 p)
SF	Wycombe Wanderers (H)	2–1

Coventry's 2016–17 EFL Trophy campaign commenced in the group stage, competing in Southern Group D along with Wycombe Wanderers, Northampton Town, and a team from the West Ham United academy. West Ham were one of 16 academy teams from Premier League and EFL Championship clubs appearing following the tournament revamp in the summer of 2016. In Coventry's first match, played on 30 August 2016, they hosted the West Ham academy team at the Ricoh Arena. The game's attendance – 2,091, of whom just 98 were away supporters – set a record for the lowest gate at a Coventry first-team game since they started playing at the stadium in 2005. West Ham took the lead against the run of play after 33 minutes with a Toni Martínez goal, but Coventry quickly equalised with Jordan Turnbull's first goal for the club. They took the lead early in the second half through Rúben Lameiras with a Jordan Willis goal and Turnbull's second sealing the win. The final score was 4–2 as Martínez scored a late consolation goal for the visitors.

Their second group game was at home to Northampton in early August, with an attendance – 2,085 – even lower than that of the West Ham game. Coventry took the lead after just 20 seconds through Dan Agyei but Northampton levelled 70 seconds after that through Marc Richards. Jodi Jones restored City's lead in the seventh minute and Lameiras scored in the second half to seal a 3–1 win. Both Coventry and Wycombe had already qualified for the last 32 when the teams met at Adams Park in November, but the match was relevant in determining which team would have home advantage in the next round, as group winner. Prioritising their league campaign over the Trophy, Coventry fielded a weakened team with just five starters from the previous league game – the minimum permitted under competition rules. The hosts took a 2–0 lead through Stephen McGinn and Scott Kashket but a brace from Ryan Haynes and a George Thomas tap-in, all in the space of nine-second-half minutes, turned the match around. Jones added another to make it 4–2 to Coventry.

Coventry's first fixture in the knockout phase was against Crawley Town at the Ricoh Arena. The match came amid a poor run of form for City, and the crowd of 1,338 represented the third time the stadium's low attendance record for a first-team game had been broken in the 2016–17 competition. Sordell scored the only goal after 35 minutes, in a game which lacked quality by either side. On 10 January 2017, Coventry played their last-16 game against the Brighton & Hove Albion academy team. With a line-up significantly changed from their regular league team, they played what journalists Alan Poole and Andy Turner of the Coventry Telegraph described as "one of their most rounded displays of the season". Goals from Lameiras, Thomas and Haynes secured a comfortable 3–0 win and passage to the quarter-finals.

The quarter-final match was played later in January, as City travelled to Wales for a match against the academy side of Swansea City. After a lacklustre first half, Swansea won a penalty after the interval when Haynes fouled Oli McBurnie. The Swansea striker took the kick and put his side in front. Coventry then equalised close to the end of normal time through an own goal by Adnan Marić, as he fought for a header with Willis in the penalty area. The game went to a penalty shoot-out, which Coventry won 4–2. Thomas, Burundian international Gaël Bigirimana, Kyel Reid and Lameiras all scored their kicks while goalkeeper Reice Charles-Cook saved penalties by Swansea's Botti Biabi and George Byers.

Coventry's semi-final saw them play Wycombe Wanderers for the second time in the campaign, this time at the Ricoh Arena. A crowd of 11,672 watched the game, which was also televised on Sky Sports. Coventry scored two early goals through Stuart Beavon and Thomas, and looked comfortable at half-time with a 2–0 lead. Wycombe were much stronger in the second half, buoyed by the arrival of striker Adebayo Akinfenwa. He pulled a goal back on 55 minutes and Wycombe dominated the remainder of the match, launching a succession of attacks on the City goal. Coventry hung on for a 2–1 victory that earned them their first match at Wembley Stadium since the 1987 FA Charity Shield match, which followed their triumph in that year's FA Cup.

=== Oxford United ===
Group stage		Result
1	Exeter City (H)	4–2
2	Swindon Town (A)	0–0 (1–3 p)
3	Chelsea academy (A)	1–1 (12–13 p)

Southern Group C table
Pos	Team	Pld	Pts
1	Swindon Town (Q)	3	7
2	Oxford United (Q)	3	5
3	Exeter City	3	4
4	Chelsea academy	3	2

Knockout phase		Result
2R	Southend United (A)	1–1 (4–3 p)
3R	Scunthorpe United (H)	4–1
QF	Bradford City (H)	2–1
SF	Luton Town (A)	3–2

Oxford were placed in Southern Group C for the group phase, alongside Exeter City and Swindon Town. Like Coventry, they also faced a Premier League academy side, that of Chelsea. Their opener was against Exeter at the Kassam Stadium in late August. Tyler Roberts opened the scoring for Oxford early in the game and Chris Maguire doubled their lead on 35 minutes with a penalty. Goals from Matt Jay and Liam McAlinden drew the Devon side level, but strikes from Ryan Taylor and Alex MacDonald in the final 20 minutes sealed a 4–2 win for United. For their second match on 4 October 2016, they travelled to local rivals Swindon Town. It was an ill-tempered game with six yellow cards issued, two for Swindon and four for Oxford. There was also a straight red card before half time for MacDonald after he stamped on Swindon's Anton Rodgers. The game finished 0–0, the drawn fixture leading to a penalty shoot-out. Five of the nine penalties taken were saved, three by Swindon keeper Will Henry and only two by Oxford's Simon Eastwood, resulting in a 3–1 shoot-out win and two points for Swindon, with one point for Oxford.

Oxford travelled to Stamford Bridge for their final group game on 8 November, to face the Chelsea academy team. United needed just one point to secure qualification, while their hosts were already eliminated following two defeats, but it was Chelsea who scored first through Josimar Quintero, shortly before half time. The young Chelsea team appeared to be on the verge of their first ever win in the tournament until Kane Hemmings scored an equaliser for Oxford in injury time at the end of the game. The game therefore went to penalties to decide which team would take two points from the game, and which team just one. With 34 penalties taken, 17 by each side, the shoot-out set the English football record for the most kicks, eclipsing the previous record of 32 which had occurred on two occasions. Chelsea were the eventual winners, by a score of 13–12, as the shoot-out concluded with a goal scored and then a goal saved by Blues keeper Bradley Collins. They, therefore, scored two points to Oxford's one, but the visitors nonetheless progressed through to the second round as runners-up to Swindon.

For their second-round match, Oxford travelled to Roots Hall for a match against Southend United. The match remained goalless until close to the end when Maguire scored for Oxford, a free-kick from 27 metres (30 yd) out. The lead was short-lived, as Southend's Anthony Wordsworth equalised immediately. For the third game in a row in the competition, Oxford faced a penalty shoot-out. This time they were successful, scoring all but one of their kicks while Eastwood saved from Southend's Simon Cox and Stephen McLaughlin's penalty went over the bar. Their reward was a home tie in the last 16, in which they hosted Scunthorpe United. The visitors dominated early and took the lead after ten minutes, Luke Williams scoring a penalty after he had been fouled in the area. Duane Holmes then took a shot when he had only Eastwood to beat, but the Oxford goalkeeper saved it. Oxford turned the game around, Marvin Johnson equalising on 18 minutes in the team's first attack of the game and taking the lead four minutes later. Hemmings was the scorer of this goal and he added two more in the second half, one of them a penalty, to complete his hat-trick as Oxford won the game 4–1.

The quarter-final, in January 2017, was also played at the Kassam, with Bradford City as their opponents. Weary after a dramatic FA Cup match against Newcastle United during the weekend, United started the game tentatively, relying on two saves by Eastwood to keep the game goalless. They played much better after half-time, following a tactical switch. Midway through the second half, Bradford's Rory McArdle had to leave the pitch to receive treatment for a head injury. Oxford capitalised on the temporary advantage, scoring twice in two minutes through Maguire and Johnson. Jordy Hiwula pulled one back for the visitors with five minutes remaining, but Oxford held on to book their place in the semi-final. Their final-four game was played at Kenilworth Road against Luton Town on 1 March 2017. Once again Oxford relied on Eastwood for crucial saves early in the game, but they then took the lead as Phil Edwards fired in while sitting on the ground, after a mis-hit shot by Liam Sercombe. They doubled their lead after 69 minutes through Johnson and appeared to be heading for a comfortable win until Luton retaliated with two goals of their own, from Isaac Vassell and Danny Hylton. Oxford clinched the match shortly after the equaliser, however, Johnson scoring with an 18-metre (20 yd) left-footed shot to book his team's place in the final.

== Match ==
=== Pre-match ===
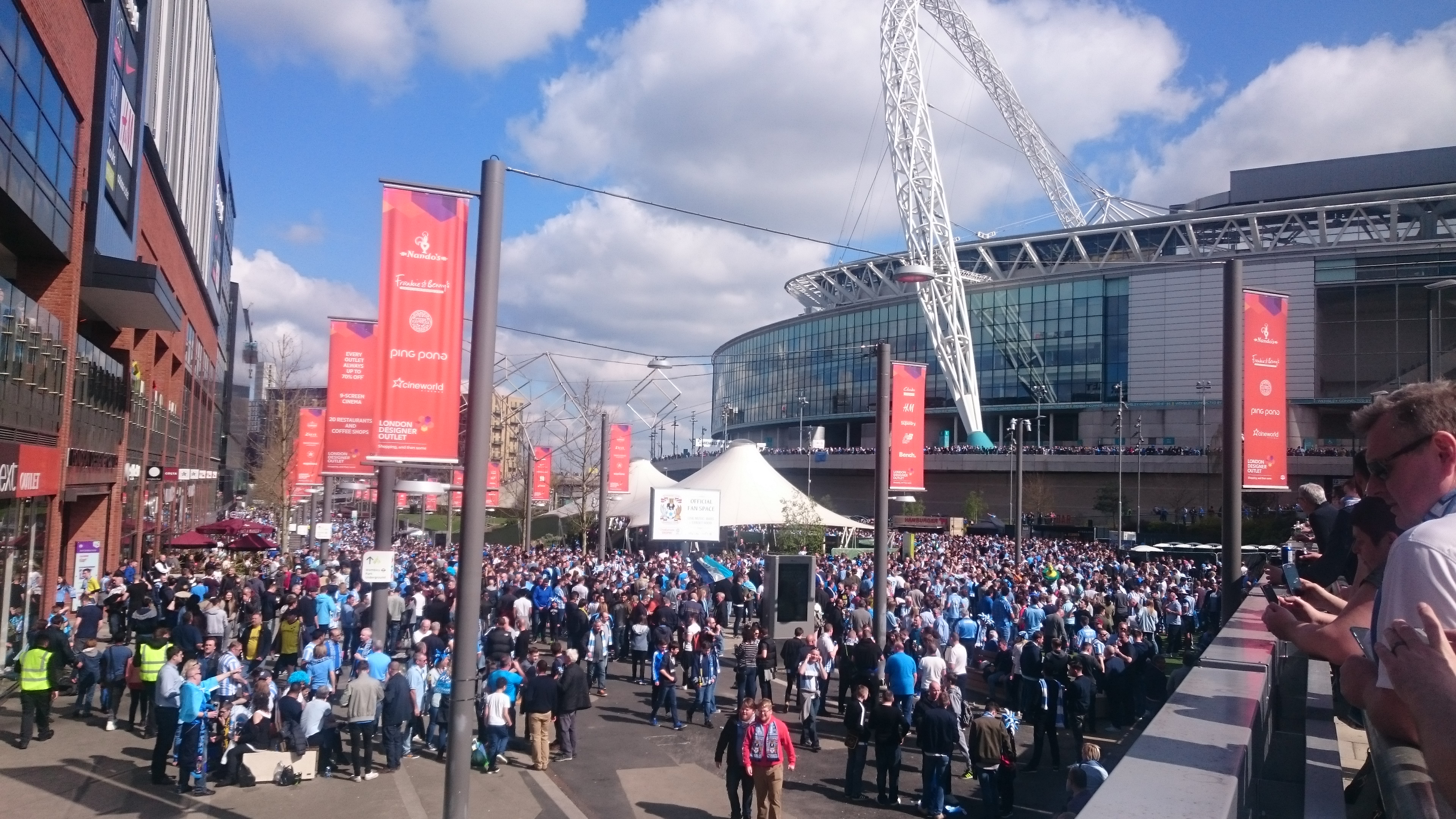
Supporters gather outside the stadium before the game

With Coventry at the bottom of League One and Oxford challenging for a play-off place, City manager Mark Robins was pragmatic about his team's prospects of victory. In a radio interview before the game, he said that "there's no pressure on us, we're underdogs in terms of league position". He urged his players to make the most of their day out at Wembley Stadium but also noted that the best way to enjoy the occasion would be to win the match. As he had not been the club's manager during their progress to the final, Robins chose to eschew the usual convention that the manager leads out the team. In his place, the club selected coach and former goalkeeper Steve Ogrizovic, who had played in the FA Cup winning team 30 years earlier. Oxford manager Michael Appleton addressed the issue of low supporter turnout following the inclusion of academy teams in the tournament. He voiced his own frustration about the matter but also asked Oxford supporters to attend the game. "The more support we can get on the day, the better. All we can promise as a club and as a team is that we'll be going all out to try and win the game and bring a bit of silverware back," he commented in an interview with BBC Radio Oxford. Coventry City sold around 42,500 tickets for the match, outnumbering the opposition fans.

The referee for the match was Chris Sarginson, who had officiated Coventry once during the league season, a 0–0 draw with Oldham Athletic in December. His most recent game involving Oxford was a goalless draw at Exeter in 2014. The assistant referees were Neil Radford and Matthew Parry, with Dean Whitestone named as the fourth official. Chris Husband was the reserve assistant referee. Robins made a number of changes from the side that had beaten Bristol Rovers in the previous league game, including the replacement of Ollie Clarke by Chris Stokes, and Lameiras playing instead of Jones. First team goalkeeper Lee Burge played in goal, rather than Reice Charles-Cook who had played in the semi-final against Wycombe. Oxford named a close to full strength side with midfielder Ryan Ledson returning from international duty with the England under-20 team and Maguire being declared fit to start after injury worries. Joe Rothwell retained his place after playing well in the previous league game against Bury.

The weather on the day of the final was sunny and fans of both sides arrived at the game with what journalists covering the match for BBC Sport described as "club-based paraphernalia that only seems to make appearances on days like this". Former Coventry manager John Sillett, who had led the club to their FA Cup win 30 years earlier, appeared on the pitch before the kick-off and made a speech to the club's supporters. The national anthem before the game was sung by Natalie Rushdie, performing in her fifth appearance at a Wembley event. The attendance at the game of 74,434 was at the time the highest for the EFL Trophy at the new Wembley Stadium since its opening in 2007. This record was broken in the 2019 final between Portsmouth and Sunderland.

=== First half ===
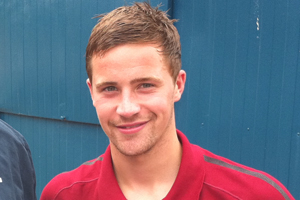
Chris Maguire helped Oxford dominate possession in the first half but Coventry led at half time

The match began at 14:30 BST, with both sets of supporters singing loudly. After a quiet opening with just one shot on goal by either side, Coventry took the lead on 11 minutes through a Bigirimana goal, his second for the club. The Burundian midfielder was the first to react to the loose ball after a Beavon volley had been stopped. Oxford began pressing more consistently after falling behind and had chances to equalise on 15 minutes, when Curtis Nelson challenged for a corner with Turnbull, and on 22 minutes when John Lundstram had a clear shot in the penalty area but failed to kick it cleanly. Ledson committed a heavy foul on Coventry's Kyel Reid on 18 minutes, but was not booked. Oxford continued to control the game as the half-hour mark approached, with striker Maguire gaining frequent possession of the ball, but Coventry were able to defend and looked threatening themselves when attacking, particularly through Reid.

Oxford appealed for a penalty after 31 minutes, when Haynes made contact with Hemmings, but the referee turned them down and replays suggested it was a legal shoulder-to-shoulder challenge. Bigirimana then received the first yellow card of the game after 39 minutes following a foul on Ledson. Coventry went close to scoring a second shortly before half time as a Lameiras shot from the edge of the penalty area was blocked. Attacking on the break, Oxford then had their best chance of the first half. Johnson received the ball close to the sideline and fired in a cross for Robert Hall, but the Oxford striker's shot went wide of the goal. The score remained 1–0 as the half-time whistle was blown. In its online commentary of the game, the Oxford Mail reported that despite their team's dominance of possession, they had lacked sufficient potency in attack. The Coventry Telegraph in its minute-by-minute report urged Robins to tell his players that they "need to start asking Oxford a few more questions rather than being forced to defend what appears to be a fragile lead".

=== Second half ===
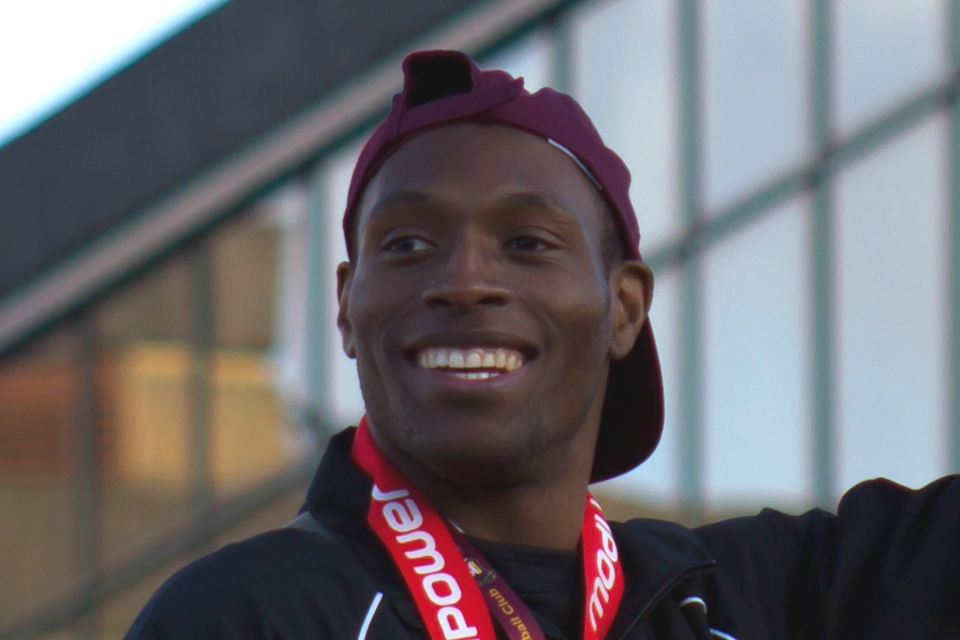
Kyel Reid set up Coventry's second goal

Play resumed at 15:34 with no changes made by either team during the interval. Coventry had an early corner but it passed through the penalty area without anyone able to connect. Hemmings then stopped playing after he thought he had been fouled, but the referee adjudged that there was no infringement and Coventry were able to mount an attack. Beavon's shot was saved by Eastwood, however. Coventry dominated the opening ten minutes of the second half and went close to a second goal when Thomas beat the United defence, though the attack broke down when his cross was off target. Thomas then forced Eastwood to make a difficult save from a close-range shot. On 55 minutes City finally made the breakthrough: once again it was Thomas who had the chance, receiving a cross from the edge of the area by Reid and firing the resulting volley low into the corner of the goal. The BBC Sports correspondents covering the game described it as a "stunning, stunning goal". Oxford made a substitution, replacing Ledson with Sercombe, and responded positively once again to conceding but remained unable to penetrate the City defence. Coventry made their first substitution on the hour mark as Willis went off injured, replaced by Dion Kelly-Evans.

Oxford had their best chance of the second half on 74 minutes, as Maguire attempted to score from a free kick but Burge was able to tip it over the crossbar. One minute later they scored their first goal of the game. After winning a corner, which was taken by Maguire, Coventry cleared the ball, but it fell to Sercombe who hit a low shot through several players and into the corner of the net. Burge got one hand to the ball but was unable to stop it. United had a chance to level the game four minutes after scoring, as Hall found himself one-on-one with Burge, but he wasted the opportunity and the City keeper was able to make the save. A threatened Oxford breakaway on 82 minutes was stopped by a Bigirimana foul; the Coventry player had already been booked and the BBC reporter at the game thought he would be sent off, but the referee decided to punish him only with a free kick. Oxford continued to press as the game drew to a close. With one minute left of the five minutes of stoppage time allocated, Oxford won a corner. Eastwood joined the attack in the Coventry penalty area as Oxford had several shots on goal, but following a Burge save and a clearance off the goal line by the defence, City were able to escape. The game finished shortly afterwards, with a final score of Coventry City 2–1 Oxford United.

=== Details ===
2 April 2017
14:30 BST

Coventry City	2–1	Oxford United
Bigirimana 11'; G. Thomas 55'	Report	Sercombe 75'

Wembley Stadium, London
Attendance: 74,434
Referee: Chris Sarginson

Coventry City	Oxford United

GK	1	(England) Lee Burge
RB	2	(England) Jordan Willis (c)		(substituted off) 60'
CB	3	(England) Chris Stokes
CB	4	(England) Jordan Turnbull
LB	24	(England) Ryan Haynes
RM	27	(Wales) George Thomas		(substituted off) 82'
CM	31	(England) Ben Stevenson
CM	5	(Burundi) Gaël Bigirimana	(yellow card) 39'
CM	8	(Portugal) Rúben Lameiras
LM	11	(England) Kyel Reid
CF	16	(England) Stuart Beavon		(substituted off) 90+5'
Substitutes:
GK	23	(England) Reice Charles-Cook
DF	29	(Wales) Cian Harries
DF	30	(England) Dion Kelly-Evans		(substituted on) 60'
MF	10	(England) Jodi Jones		(substituted on) 82'
MF	13	(Bulgaria) Vladimir Gadzhev
FW	17	(England) Michael Folivi
FW	20	(England) Marcus Tudgay		(substituted on) 90+5'
Manager:
(England) Mark Robins

GK	1	(England) Simon Eastwood
RB	16	(England) Phil Edwards
CB	5	(England) Curtis Nelson
CB	33	(England) Chey Dunkley	(yellow card) 63'
LB	28	(England) Marvin Johnson
CM	4	(England) John Lundstram (c)
CM	23	(England) Ryan Ledson		(substituted off) 57'
LM	18	(England) Joe Rothwell		(substituted off) 90+1'
RF	19	(England) Robert Hall
LF	10	(Scotland) Chris Maguire
CF	15	(England) Kane Hemmings
Substitutes:
GK	34	(England) Jack Stevens
DF	2	(Wales) Christian Ribeiro
DF	3	(England) Joe Skarz
DF	22	(England) Sam Long
DF	35	(Republic of Ireland) Canice Carroll
MF	8	(England) Liam Sercombe	(yellow card) 86'	(substituted on) 57'
MF	14	(England) Josh Ruffels		(substituted on) 90+1'
Manager:
(England) Michael Appleton

== Post-match ==
Coventry's win gave them their first major trophy since their victory in the 1987 FA Cup final. Thomas was named the man of the match, telling interviewers that "to get the winner at Wembley in a cup final is what dreams are made of". Like Robins he praised the club's fans, saying they had "been unbelievable throughout the whole season and today everyone came and had a great time". Robins commented on the importance of the victory for Coventry's supporters. "It's 30 years since they’ve been to Wembley", he said after the game, "and it was really important for us as a football club to show the world that we are still alive and kicking. It gives everybody a reminder that we have a really good fanbase and there's so much potential at this place." In his post-match interview, Oxford manager Appleton said his principal feeling about the game was one of frustration. "The game was probably decided in both boxes today. Coventry had a hunger and a desire to keep the ball out of the net more than we did. When you need to win finals, that's the type of desire you need," he said. The Lord Mayor of Coventry had commented before the game that he would be open to the possibility of a parade and civic reception, similar to that after the team's victory in the 1987 FA Cup. The club declined to pursue this, however.

Despite the cup win, Coventry were relegated to League Two at the end of the season, finishing 23rd out of 24 teams in League One. Their stay in the league's bottom tier was limited to one season, however, as they returned to Wembley one year later for the 2018 League Two play-off final, recording a 3–1 win against Exeter City. Oxford United still retained the possibility of reaching the play-offs at the time of the final, but they eventually finished the season in eighth place, four points adrift of Millwall who took sixth place and the final play-off berth.

At the end of the 2016–17 season, representatives from League One and League Two clubs met to discuss the future of the EFL Trophy, in particular, whether to retain the inclusion of academy teams. There were three options under consideration – retaining the 64-team format, dropping the academy teams and reverting to a 48-team tournament, or cancelling the competition altogether. There was some disagreement among the clubs, but ultimately the 64-team version was retained for at least the next two seasons, gaining support from two-thirds of the League One and League Two outfits. Robins was among those supporting the format, commenting that it had provided an "invaluable experience for those players at an Under-21 level to participate in senior football", citing the experience of his own young players and the opportunity they had received to play at Wembley. Appleton was more critical of the format, preferring to return to the 48-team version. He commented that the use of loan deals and reserve team football was a better way for top clubs to develop their academy players than participating in the EFL Trophy, citing his own experience playing for Manchester United reserves during the 1990s.
