= Robert Hall (footballer) =

English footballer (born 1993)

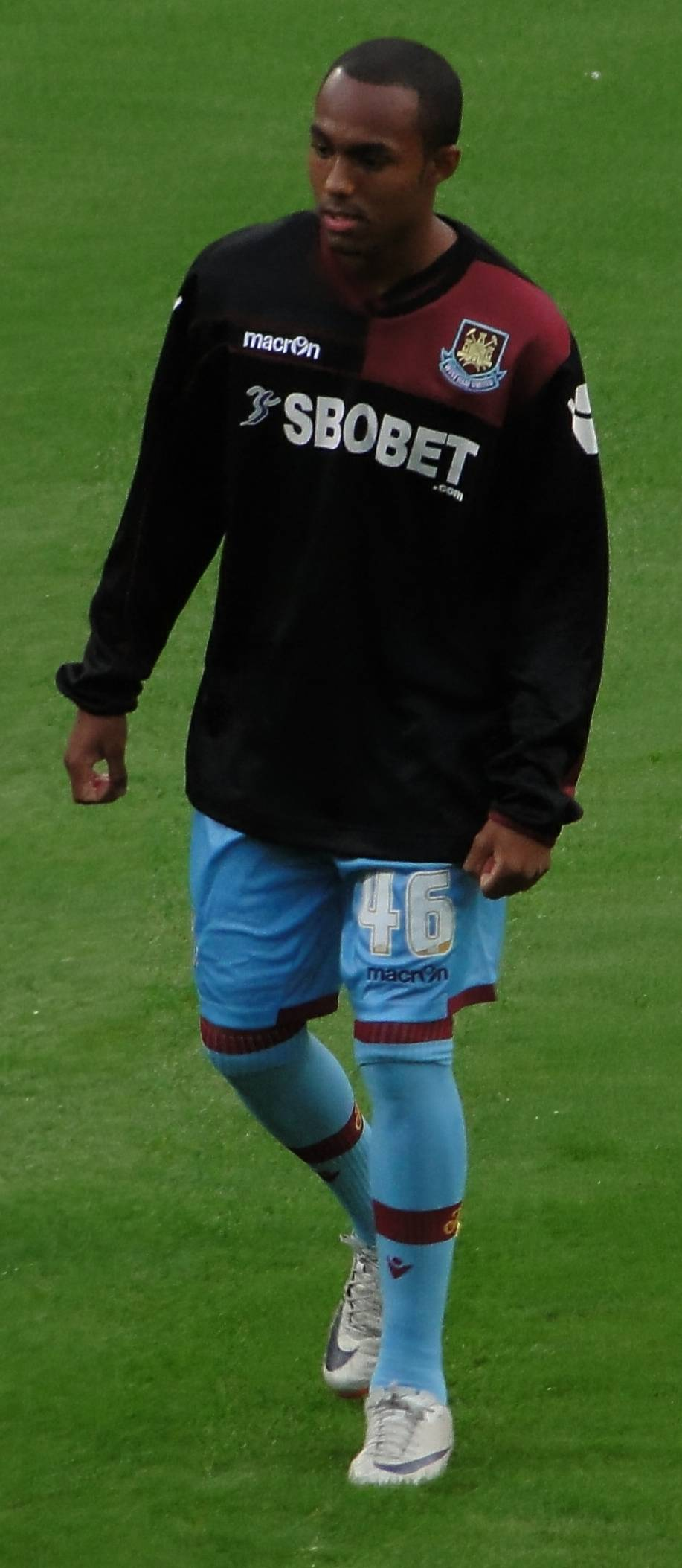
- Hall warming up for West Ham United in 2011

Personal information
- Full name: Robert Kieran Dennis Hall
- Date of birth: 20 October 1993 (age 33)
- Place of birth: Aylesbury, England
- Height: 5 ft 8 in (1.73 m)
- Positions: Forward; winger

Youth career
- 2001–2010: West Ham United

Senior career*
Years	Team	Apps	(Gls)
2010–2013	West Ham United	4	(0)
2011	→ Oxford United (loan)	9	(5)
2011	→ Oxford United (loan)	4	(0)
2012	→ Milton Keynes Dons (loan)	2	(0)
2012–2013	→ Birmingham City (loan)	13	(0)
2013	→ Bolton Wanderers (loan)	1	(0)
2013–2016	Bolton Wanderers	31	(1)
2015	→ Milton Keynes Dons (loan)	7	(3)
2015–2016	→ Milton Keynes Dons (loan)	27	(2)
2016–2021	Oxford United	65	(8)
2020	→ Forest Green Rovers (loan)	6	(0)
2021–2023	Barnet	59	(4)
2023–2024	Hampton & Richmond Borough	19	(2)
2024	Bedford Town	15	(0)
2024–2025	Cheshunt	13	(0)
Total		275	(25)

International career
2008–2009	England U16	6	(1)
2009–2010	England U17	16	(8)
2011	England U18	1	(0)
2011–2012	England U19	4	(1)
Medal record
Men's football
Representing England
UEFA European Under-17 Championship
Winner	2010 Liechtenstein
- * Club domestic league appearances and goals as of 13:29, 8 July 2025 (UTC)

Robert Kieran Dennis Hall (born 20 October 1993) is an English former professional footballer who played as a forward or on the wing.

During his time as a young player at West Ham United, Hall spent time on loan at Oxford United, Milton Keynes Dons, Birmingham City and Bolton Wanderers before finally signing for Bolton on a permanent basis.

== Club career ==
=== West Ham United ===
Hall began his career with West Ham United in 2001 and signed his first professional contract in October 2010. Hall was given squad number 46 for the 2011–12 season and was an unused substitute for West Ham's League Cup defeat by Aldershot Town in August 2011.

==== Oxford United (loan) ====
In September he signed a one-month loan deal with Oxford United, later extended by a further month. He made his debut on 13 September against Dagenham & Redbridge, scoring the only goal in a 1–0 victory, the first of six goals in his ten appearances in all competitions. West Ham recalled Hall on 31 October as cover for injured players. He did not, however, feature for them and returned to Oxford on a one-month loan on 16 November. Hall played four games for Oxford during his second loan spell, without scoring, before being recalled by West Ham on 21 December. He made his West Ham debut on 31 December in a 2–1 away defeat to Derby County, coming on in the 79th minute as a substitute for Papa Bouba Diop.

==== Milton Keynes Dons (loan) ====
In March 2012 Hall signed on loan for League One club Milton Keynes Dons until the end of the 2011–12 season. He was West Ham's Academy Player of the Season for 2011–12.

Hall played once for West Ham in the Premier League and twice in the League Cup in the 2012–13 season before joining Championship club Birmingham City on loan in November.

==== Birmingham City (loan) ====
Hall made his Birmingham debut away at Derby County. After an hour, he made a pacy run down the centre and was fouled as he entered the penalty area. Marlon King converted the penalty for Birmingham's equaliser, but they lost 3–2. He provided the assists for both of Curtis Davies's goals in the 2–1 defeat of Barnsley in December. West Ham declined to allow Hall to play for Birmingham in the FA Cup, but were prepared to extend his loan for a further month, to be reviewed on a monthly basis. He made seven assists from thirteen Championship appearances before returning to West Ham for assessment of a groin problem, and underwent surgery on a hernia a few days before his loan formally ended on 16 March.

=== Bolton Wanderers ===
On 28 March 2013, he was loaned out by West Ham again, this time for a month initially to link up with Bolton Wanderers. He made only one appearance, starting against Blackpool in a 2–2 draw on the last day of the season. He started the game but was replaced by substitute Marvin Sordell after 37 minutes when Bolton were 2–0 down.

After his contract at West Ham expired, Hall signed for Bolton permanently on 1 July 2013, signing a three-year contract. In August 2013, the Professional Football Compensation Committee set Hall's transfer fee as an initial £450,000 with additional fees payable upon certain conditions occurring. West Ham would also be due 20% of any profit made by Bolton should Hall be transferred. He made his second debut on 6 August as he started in Bolton's 3–1 League Cup away win against Shrewsbury Town. He scored the first goal of the game, his first for Bolton.

At the end of the 2015–16 season, the club confirmed that he would be leaving when his contract expired at the end of June, following a knee injury sustained while on loan at MK Dons.

==== Milton Keynes Dons (loan) ====
On 26 March 2015, Hall re-joined Milton Keynes Dons on-loan until the end of the 2014–15 season. On 18 April 2015, Hall scored his first goals for Milton Keynes Dons with a hat-trick in a 6–1 home defeat of Leyton Orient. He dedicated the goals to his friend and former teammate at West Ham United, Dylan Tombides, who died exactly one year previous from cancer.

On 28 July 2015, Hall signed for a second consecutive loan period until the end of the 2015–16 season. On 5 April 2016 Hall suffered a ruptured anterior cruciate ligament in his left knee during training, and returned to Bolton Wanderers for treatment.

=== Oxford United ===
On 19 July 2016, Oxford United announced that they had signed the former loanee on a two-year permanent deal, despite his ongoing injury. He made his first appearance as a substitute in an EFL Trophy match against Chelsea U23 on 8 November, and his first league appearance, again as a substitute, against Shrewsbury Town four days later. His first starting appearance came in a League One fixture against Coventry City on 19 November. In his first season back at the club, he scored 6 goals in 26 league appearances (5 as substitute) and appeared at Wembley in the 2017 EFL Trophy Final. After a bright start to 2017–18, in which he scored a further 5 goals in 15 appearances (two in the league), he spent four months out of contention due to a long-term injury, before returning to the first team for the final two games of the season. His 2018–19 season was even worse hit by injury: after playing in the opening fixture, he sustained a knee injury that required an operation and did not reappear until the last four games of the season. However, he signed a new one-year contract with Oxford in May 2019, with the option of a further year. This option was taken up before Hall was released at the end of the 2020-21 season.

==== Forest Green Rovers (loan) ====
After signing a one-year contract extension with Oxford, Hall joined League Two club Forest Green Rovers on a six-month loan on 24 January 2020.

=== Barnet ===
Following his release by Oxford, Hall went on trial at Gillingham in pre-season. He signed for Barnet on 21 September 2021. He was released at the end of the 2022–23 season.

=== Later career ===
Hall joined Hampton & Richmond Borough for the 2023-24 season.

In December 2024, he joined Isthmian League Premier Division side Cheshunt.

On 4 July 2025, Hall announced his retirement from football.

== International career ==
Hall has represented England at under-16, under-17, under-18 and under-19 levels and was a member of the team that won the 2010 UEFA European Under-17 Championship in Liechtenstein. His under-19 debut came on 10 November 2011 when he appeared as a substitute for Harry Kane and scored the only goal in a victory against Denmark under-19 at Falmer Stadium.

== Personal life ==
Hall was born Aylesbury, Buckinghamshire, where he attended The Grange School. A cousin, Reece Hall-Johnson, also played football professionally.

== Career statistics ==
As of end of 2024–25 season

Club statistics
Club	Season	League			FA Cup		League Cup		Other		Total	
Club	Season	Division	Apps	Goals	Apps	Goals	Apps	Goals	Apps	Goals	Apps	Goals
West Ham United	2011–12	Championship	3	0	1	0	0	0	—		4	0
West Ham United	2012–13	Premier League	1	0	0	0	2	0	—		3	0
West Ham United	Total		4	0	1	0	2	0	0	0	7	0
Oxford United (loan)	2011–12	League Two	13	5	0	0	0	0	1 (Note: Appearance in Football League Trophy)	1	14	6
Milton Keynes Dons (loan)	2011–12	League One	2	0	0	0	0	0	0	0	2	0
Birmingham City (loan)	2012–13	Championship	13	0	0	0	0	0	—		13	0
Bolton Wanderers (loan)	2012–13	Championship	1	0	0	0	0	0	—		1	0
Bolton Wanderers	2013–14	Championship	22	1	0	0	2	1	—		24	2
Bolton Wanderers	2014–15	Championship	9	0	0	0	1	0	—		10	0
Bolton Wanderers	2015–16	Championship	0	0	0	0	0	0	—		0	0
Bolton Wanderers	Total		32	1	0	0	3	1	0	0	35	2
Milton Keynes Dons (loan)	2014–15	League One	7	3	0	0	0	0	0	0	7	3
Milton Keynes Dons (loan)	2015–16	Championship	27	2	3	0	2	0	0	0	32	2
Milton Keynes Dons (loan)	Total		34	5	3	0	2	0	0	0	39	5
Oxford United	2016–17	League One	26	6	4	0	0	0	5 (Note: Appearance(s) in EFL Trophy)	0	35	6
Oxford United	2017–18	League One	13	2	1	0	1	0	2	3	17	5
Oxford United	2018–19	League One	4	0	0	0	0	0	0	0	4	0
Oxford United	2019–20	League One	13	0	3	2	4	1	4	3	24	6
Oxford United	2020–21	League One	9	0	1	0	1	1	7	1	18	2
Oxford United	Total		65	8	9	2	6	2	18	7	98	19
Forest Green Rovers (loan)	2019–20	League Two	6	0	0	0	0	0	0	0	6	0
Barnet	2021–22	National League	34	3	1	0	—		1 (Note: Appearance(s) in FA Trophy)	1	36	4
Barnet	2022–23	National League	25	1	2	0	—		2	0	29	1
Barnet	Total		59	4	3	0	—		3	1	65	5
Hampton & Richmond Borough	2023–24	National League South	19	2	1	0	—		4	0	24	2
Bedford Town	2024–25	Southern League Premier Division Central	15	0	1	0	—		1	0	17	0
Cheshunt	2024–25	Isthmian League Premier Division	13	0	0	0	—		0	0	13	0
Career total			275	25	18	2	13	3	27	9	333	39

== Honours ==
Milton Keynes Dons

- Football League One runner-up: 2014–15

Oxford United

- EFL Trophy runner-up: 2016–17

England U17

- UEFA European Under-17 Championship: 2010
