= Marvin Johnson (footballer, born 1990) =

English footballer

Personal information
- Full name: Marvin Nicholas Johnson
- Date of birth: 1 December 1990 (age 35)
- Place of birth: Birmingham, England
- Height: 5 ft 10 in (1.78 m)
- Positions: Winger; wing-back

Team information
- Current team: Solihull Moors

Youth career
- Solihull Moors

Senior career*
Years	Team	Apps	(Gls)
2009–2010	Solihull Moors (Note: Soccerway misattributes to Marvin Johnson 8 appearances and a goal for Solihull Moors in the 2010–11 season, despite his having left the club for Romulus by early August 2010. The appearances and goal actually belong to Simon Johnson.)	5	(0)
2010	→ Coleshill Town (loan)		
2010–2012	Romulus		
2012–2015	Kidderminster Harriers	108	(17)
2014	→ Hednesford Town (loan)	6	(2)
2015–2016	Motherwell	53	(6)
2016–2017	Oxford United	41	(3)
2017–2021	Middlesbrough	97	(5)
2018–2019	→ Sheffield United (loan)	11	(0)
2021–2025	Sheffield Wednesday	150	(9)
2025–2026	Port Vale	5	(0)
2026–	Solihull Moors	0	(0)

International career
2012	England C	1	(0)
- * Club domestic league appearances and goals as of 00:40, 7 October 2026 (UTC)

Marvin Nicholas Johnson (born 1 December 1990) is an English professional footballer who plays as a winger or wing-back for National League club Solihull Moors.

Johnson started his career in non-League football, playing for Solihull Moors, Coleshill Town (on loan), Romulus, Kidderminster Harriers, and Hednesford Town (on loan). He was capped by England C in 2012. He scored 20 goals in 120 games across all competitions for Kidderminster to win himself a move to Scottish Premiership club Motherwell in February 2015. He was sold to Oxford United in August 2016 for what was reported to be a club record fee of around £650,000. He stayed with the club for 12 months and played for Oxford in their defeat in the 2017 EFL Trophy final. He was sold to Middlesbrough for a fee in the region of £2.5 million. He spent the 2018–19 season on loan at Sheffield United, who won promotion out of the Championship in second place. He played 103 games for Middlesbrough, of which 97 were Championship appearances, and was released after a four-year stay. He joined Sheffield Wednesday in August 2021 and was promoted out of League One through the play-offs in 2023. In total, he played 169 games in four years at the club. He signed a short-term contract with Port Vale in October 2025. He rejoined Solihull Moors in October 2026.

== Career ==
=== Early career ===
Johnson never played academy football and instead began his career with Solihull Moors in the Conference North. He spent a loan spell at Coleshill Town, where he scored a hat-trick against Malvern Town. While a Solihull Moors player he won the FA County Youth Cup in May 2009 representing Birmingham FA. He worked as a shop assistant and took his coaching badges during his time at Damson Park. In March 2010, he was linked with a transfer to Rushall Olympic, but after he was released by Moors during the 2010 close season he signed for Romulus of the Northern Premier League First Division South, and was their top scorer in the 2011–12 season. While playing for Romulus, Johnson had a five-day trial at Championship club Burnley in December 2011.

=== Kidderminster Harriers ===
Johnson signed an 18-month contract with Conference Premier club Kidderminster Harriers in February 2012. He featured 12 times in the second half of the 2011–12 campaign. He was capped for the England C team in a 4–0 defeat to Russia U23 in an International Challenge Trophy game on 5 June 2012. He fractured his toe in December 2012, which manager Steve Burr said would take six weeks to recover from. In January 2013, he received interest from Football League clubs, including Crewe Alexandra, Colchester United and Northampton Town. He signed a new one-year contract after enjoying a successful 2012–13 campaign, though Kidderminster missed out on automatic promotion by two points. He played in the play-off semi-final defeat to Wrexham.

He had a loan spell with Hednesford Town at the end of the 2013–14 season, playing in the Conference North play-off semi-final defeat to Altrincham. Johnson signed a new one-year contract with the Harriers after returning from Keys Park to Aggborough in June 2014. He scored ten goals from the wing in the first half of the 2014–15 season, making him the club's top-scorer. He won the club's November Player of the Month award. Upon Johnson's departure from the club, Harriers manager Gary Whild said that Johnson had worked hard for the move.

=== Motherwell ===
On 3 February 2015, Johnson was one of four players to sign for Scottish Premiership club Motherwell on transfer deadline day. The fee was reported to be in the region of £50,000. Before signing with Motherwell he had been in advanced talks with Football League club Yeovil Town. At the end of the 2014–15 season, with Motherwell facing potential relegation from the Scottish Premiership, Johnson featured in both legs of their play-off tie against Rangers, who had finished in third place in the Championship. After helping them to a 3–1 win in the first leg at Ibrox, Johnson scored Motherwell's first goal in a 3–0 victory in the second leg at Fir Park that ensured their Premiership survival. He agreed to a contract extension the following month to keep him at the club until 2018, saying that he "really believed" in manager Ian Baraclough.

He scored six goals from 42 appearances in the 2015–16 campaign. A popular player, he was nicknamed "Magic Marv" by supporters and attracted interest from clubs back in England. Manager Mark McGhee said that "Marvin has got to deal with the speculation and we've got to deal with it too". Johnson handed in a transfer request in August 2016. Motherwell rejected a £300,000 bid from Oxford United, and McGhee stated that he would be "amazed" if they could afford him and that Johnson should be aiming for a higher ranked club anyway. Reports of a £500,000 bid from Brighton & Hove Albion were denied as rumours.

=== Oxford United ===
On 31 August 2016, transfer deadline day, Johnson signed for Oxford United of League One for an undisclosed sum which according to the Oxford Mail is believed to be a club record fee, in the region of £650,000. On 23 November, the same week his second child was born, he scored his first goal for the club, the only goal in a 1–0 League One victory over Gillingham at the Kassam Stadium. He was named the club's Player of the Month for January after having scored three goals. He played in the final of the EFL Trophy at Wembley Stadium, which ended in a 2–1 defeat to Coventry City. In total, he scored six goals in 52 appearances throughout the 2016–17 season.

Manager Michael Appleton described him as having "athleticism and speed", a "thunderbolt shot", and "pace that scares the life out of people", surmising that he would "end up being a top-class wide player". Speaking in August 2017, new manager Pep Clotet stated that Johnson needed to improve his consistency if he wanted to play at a higher level. Club owner Darryl Eales further added that Johnson was "not for sale" amidst speculation surrounding the player's absence from matchday squads due to what was reported to be a tight hamstring. He made 55 appearances, scoring seven goals and providing 11 assists during his time at Oxford.

=== Middlesbrough ===
After prolonged speculation about his Oxford future, during which he was linked with Hull City and Birmingham City, Johnson signed a three-year contract with Middlesbrough on deadline day, 31 August 2017. The undisclosed transfer deal was described by Oxford chairman Darryl Eales as "highly attractive", and believed to be in the region of £2.5 million. Oxford enquired to bring him back to the club on loan in January 2018 after new Boro manager Tony Pulis told him he had no future at the Riverside Stadium. Oxford's offer was declined. Johnson said of Pulis that he was "not his type of player". He played 17 Championship games in the 2017–18 campaign without featuring after 13 January.

Johnson was linked with a move to his hometown club Birmingham City in the summer transfer window, where former Middlesbrough boss Garry Monk was now managing. He had impressed Monk both on the pitch and in the dressing room before Monk had been sacked. Johnson was also linked to Hull City once again. On 31 August 2018, Johnson moved on loan to Championship rivals Sheffield United for the 2018–19 season. Manager Chris Wilder stated that he "gives us plenty of options, quick, left-footed and can play in a number of positions". Wilder played him as a wing-back, though preferred to play Enda Stevens. Johnson played 12 games at Bramall Lane, helping Sheffield United to secure promotion into the Premier League.

Johnson found himself back in the Middlesbrough first team following the departure of Pulis, and impressed during pre-season. He scored the only goal of the game against Reading on 14 September 2019. On 24 November, Johnson was sent off just before half-time following a reckless slide on Hull City's Eric Lichaj, leaving his teammates a man down and unable to hold on to their two-goal lead. Manager Jonathan Woodgate condemned him for showing a lack of discipline, saying it cost the team the victory. Johnson struggled to regain his spot in the first XI following the incident, with Hayden Coulson being preferred at left wing-back. His contract expired at the end of the 2019–20 season, but he signed a short-term extension given the extended season in light of the coronavirus. He signed a new one-year contract on reduced terms with the club in August 2020, with manager Neil Warnock commenting that he had been pleased with the player thus far and hoped he could improve him further.

Further contract talks took place in January 2021. However, he then dropped down the pecking order, though Warnock insisted that he remained an important player despite preferring new signings Yannick Bolasie and Neeskens Kebano, as well as left wing-back Marc Bola. On 28 May 2021, it was announced that he would leave Middlesbrough at the end of the season, following the expiry of his contract. He had featured 43 times in all competitions throughout the 2020–21 campaign, scoring four goals and providing six assists.

=== Sheffield Wednesday ===
On 5 August 2021, Johnson joined recently relegated League One club Sheffield Wednesday. He scored his first goal for the club in an EFL Trophy tie against Newcastle United U21s on 31 August. He ended the 2021–22 campaign with three goals in 44 games, and the club exercised an option to retain him for another season. He featured 51 times in the 2022–23 season, scoring another three goals. He played in what was dubbed the "Miracle of Hillsborough", winning a penalty for the first of a four-goal comeback over Peterborough United in the play-off semi-finals. He then played in the play-off final win over Barnsley that secured the club promotion back to the Championship. Johnson was offered a new contract to stay at the club, which was confirmed on 1 July.

He was banished from the first-team squad by new manager Xisco Muñoz for unexplained reasons and ended up training on his own in Dubai. Johnson established himself under Xisco's successor, Danny Röhl, and provided four assists and four goals in 29 Championship games in the remainder of the 2023–24 season. On 29 December, he was named on the EFL Team of the Week after scoring the only goal of the game at Preston North End. He won the December PFA Fans' Player of the Month award. Ipswich Town entered talks to sign Johnson in January, having first attempted to sign the player the previous summer. He remained in Sheffield, however, and was again named on the EFL Team of the Week for his performance in a 2–0 win over Birmingham City at Hillsborough on 9 February.

On 17 May 2024, Wednesday exercised their option to keep Johnson for another year. Fresh competition did arrive, though, in the form of Max Lowe, who ended up being used more at left centre-back. Former player Lee Bullen described Johnson as "undroppable" in November. After being released from his contract following the end of the 2024–25 season, Johnson went on to criticise owner Dejphon Chansiri for late payment of wages. Johnson made 40 direct goal contributions in 169 appearances for Sheffield Wednesday and was lauded as one of the club's best free agent signings in the club's recent history.

=== Port Vale ===
On 13 October 2025, Johnson signed a short-term contract for recently promoted League One club Port Vale to reunite with his former Sheffield Wednesday manager Darren Moore. The club had sustained a series of injuries in the wing-back position at the start of the 2025–26 season. Johnson himself picked up an injury in mid-November, then suffered a setback in training at the start of December. He left the club in January 2026, following the expiry of his contract. New manager Jon Brady explained that "I think there were murmurings that he wanted to move on so it's just as simple as that". He was part of the 45-man Professional Footballers' Association (PFA) free agent squad in July 2026, and had a trial with Lincoln City the following month.

=== Solihull Moors ===
On 6 October 2026, Johnson signed a short-term deal with National League club Solihull Moors, where he started his career. Manager Chris Millington said that "he brings valuable experience, real quality on the left and versatility that gives us options across the squad".

== Style of play ==
Johnson can play either as a left-sided winger or an attack-minded wing-back, and boasts good crossing ability. He had a lot of pace as a younger player, being dubbed a "quick-footed pace merchant" by Kidderminster Harriers.

== Personal life ==
Johnson is of Jamaican descent through his paternal grandfather. As of November 2016, Johnson had two children, a boy and a girl.

== Career statistics ==
As of match played 9 January 2026

Appearances and goals by club, season and competition
Club	Season	League			National cup (Note: Includes FA Cup, Scottish Cup)		League cup (Note: Includes Football League Cup, Scottish League Cup)		Other		Total	
Club	Season	Division	Apps	Goals	Apps	Goals	Apps	Goals	Apps	Goals	Apps	Goals
Solihull Moors	2008–09	Conference North	1	0	0	0	—		0	0	1	0
Solihull Moors	2009–10	Conference North	4	0	0	0	—		0	0	4	0
Solihull Moors	Total		5	0	0	0	0	0	0	0	5	0
Kidderminster Harriers	2011–12	Conference Premier	12	0	—		—		0	0	12	0
Kidderminster Harriers	2012–13	Conference Premier	39	6	2	1	—		3 (Note: One appearance in the FA Trophy; two appearances in the Conference Premier play-offs)	0	44	7
Kidderminster Harriers	2013–14	Conference Premier	25	2	4	1	—		0	0	29	3
Kidderminster Harriers	2014–15	Conference Premier	32	9	1	0	—		2 (Note: Appearances in the FA Trophy)	1	35	10
Kidderminster Harriers	Total		108	17	7	2	0	0	5	1	120	20
Hednesford Town (loan)	2013–14	Conference North	6	2	0	0	—		2 (Note: Appearances in the Conference North play-offs)	0	8	2
Motherwell	2014–15	Scottish Premiership	11	0	—		—		2 (Note: Appearances in the Scottish Premiership relegation play-offs)	1	13	1
Motherwell	2015–16	Scottish Premiership	38	5	2	1	2	0	—		42	6
Motherwell	2016–17	Scottish Premiership	4	1	0	0	5	3	—		9	4
Motherwell	Total		53	6	2	1	7	3	2	1	64	11
Oxford United	2016–17	League One	39	3	6	0	—		7 (Note: Appearances in the EFL Trophy)	3	52	6
Oxford United	2017–18	League One	2	0	—		1	1	0	0	3	1
Oxford United	Total		41	3	6	0	1	1	7	3	55	7
Middlesbrough	2017–18	Championship	17	1	1	0	0	0	0	0	18	1
Middlesbrough	2018–19	Championship	0	0	0	0	2	1	—		2	1
Middlesbrough	2019–20	Championship	38	1	2	0	0	0	—		40	1
Middlesbrough	2020–21	Championship	42	3	0	0	1	1	—		43	4
Middlesbrough	Total		97	5	3	0	3	2	0	0	103	7
Middlesbrough U21	2017–18	—			—		—		1	0	1	0
Sheffield United (loan)	2018–19	Championship	11	0	1	0	—		—		12	0
Sheffield Wednesday	2021–22	League One	39	2	1	0	—		4 (Note: Two appearances in the EFL Trophy; two appearances in the League One play-offs)	1	44	3
Sheffield Wednesday	2022–23	League One	41	3	4	0	2	0	4 (Note: One appearance in the EFL Trophy; three appearances in the League One play-offs)	0	51	3
Sheffield Wednesday	2023–24	Championship	29	4	1	0	0	0	—		30	4
Sheffield Wednesday	2024–25	Championship	41	0	0	0	3	0	—		44	0
Sheffield Wednesday	Total		150	9	6	0	5	0	8	1	169	10
Port Vale	2025–26	League One	5	0	2	0	—		0	0	7	0
Solihull Moors	2026–27	National League	0	0	0	0	—		0	0	0	0
Career total			476	42	27	3	16	6	25	6	544	57

== Honours ==
Oxford United

- EFL Trophy runner-up: 2016–17

Sheffield United

- EFL Championship second-place promotion: 2018–19

Sheffield Wednesday

- EFL League One play-offs: 2023
