= Liam Sercombe =

English footballer (born 1990)

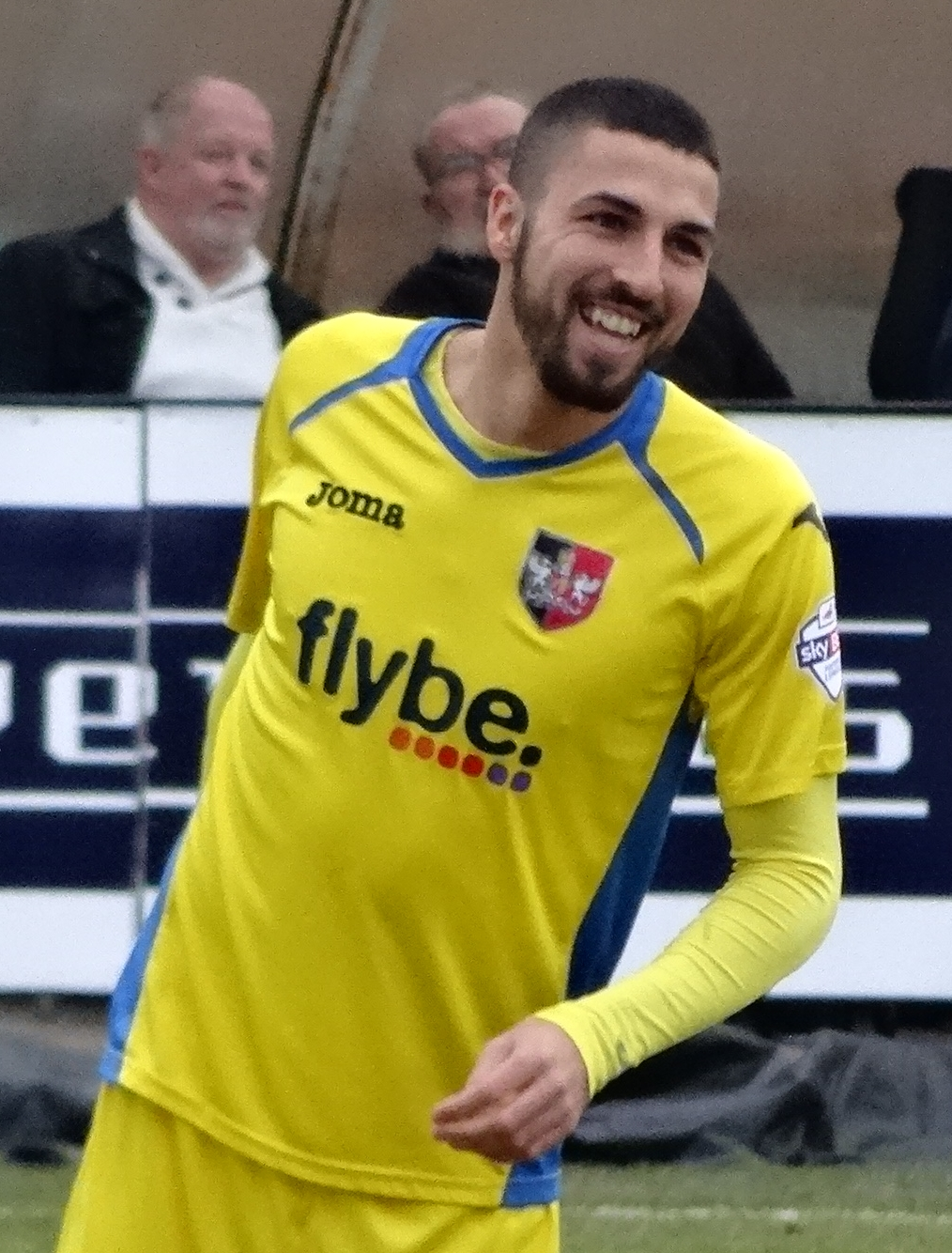
- Sercombe playing for Exeter City in 2015

Personal information
- Full name: Liam Michael Sercombe
- Date of birth: 25 April 1990 (age 36)
- Place of birth: Exeter, England
- Height: 5 ft 10 in (1.78 m)
- Position: Midfielder

Team information
- Current team: Forest Green Rovers
- Number: 10

Youth career
- 2000–2007: Exeter City

Senior career*
Years	Team	Apps	(Gls)
2007–2015	Exeter City	243	(23)
2015–2017	Oxford United	75	(17)
2017–2020	Bristol Rovers	103	(13)
2020–2024	Cheltenham Town	165	(22)
2024–	Forest Green Rovers	35	(4)
2025	→ Weston-super-Mare (loan)	4	(0)
- * Club domestic league appearances and goals as of 11:02, 10 April 2026 (UTC)

Liam Michael Sercombe (born 25 April 1990) is an English professional footballer who plays as a midfielder for National League club Forest Green Rovers.

== Career ==
=== Exeter City ===
Sercombe came through the youth ranks at Exeter City, and signed a full professional contract with the club in June 2007.

Sercombe made a number of appearances at reserve team level before making his debut on 11 August 2007 against Altrincham in the Conference National, coming on after just 11 minutes to replace the injured Andy Taylor. Exeter went on to win the match 4–1. Sercombe made seven appearances that season, helping Exeter win promotion to League Two after a five-year absence, as they beat Torquay United in the play-off semi-finals, and then Cambridge United 1–0 in the final at Wembley Stadium.

Sercombe began to play more regularly the following season and scored his first goal on 21 October 2008 as Exeter beat Port Vale 3–1 at Vale Park. He scored his second goal for the club in a 2–1 away win against Luton Town.

Exeter achieved successive promotions, and Sercombe helped them seal promotion as they beat Rotherham United 1–0 away on the final day of the 2008–09 season, manager Paul Tisdale guiding Exeter to League One for only the fourth time in their 105-year history. Sercombe scored just once in the 2009–10 season, in a 2–2 draw against Wycombe Wanderers on 20 March 2010. He scored his first goal of the 2010–11 season in a 5–1 win against Sheffield Wednesday; he scored two further goals that season, in a 3–1 win against Charlton Athletic, and a 1–1 draw against Tranmere Rovers.

On 9 April 2012, Sercombe scored twice as Exeter beat Leyton Orient 3–0 at St James Park. The following game, he scored in a 3–2 defeat to relegation rivals Rochdale. He had given Exeter a 2–0 lead at the time, but Rochdale scored three times in the last 10 minutes of the game to win the game 3–2. Sercombe scored again the following game, this time in a 4–2 home win against Walsall. On 28 April, he scored for the fourth game in a row; however, Exeter lost the game 4–1 to Carlisle United and were relegated from League One.

=== Oxford United ===
On 13 May 2015, Sercombe signed a two-year contract with Oxford United after his contract expired with former club Exeter City. He scored a career-best total of 17 goals from the centre of midfield in his first season, helping the Us secure promotion to League One. His goals included a penalty in a memorable 3–2 home win over Swansea City of the Premier League in the third round of the FA Cup. In November the following season he ruptured his medial knee ligament and was expected to miss the rest of the season, but his recovery was quicker than expected and he returned to first-team action as a substitute against Rotherham United in an FA Cup third-round victory on 4 January 2017. In February 2017 he scored Oxford's opening goal in a 2–1 away victory over local rivals Swindon Town.

He appeared at Wembley Stadium in the 2016 Football League Trophy Final, in which Oxford lost 3–2 to Barnsley, and scored his side's only goal in the final of the same competition the following year, a 2–1 defeat to Coventry City.

=== Bristol Rovers ===
After being sidelined by Oxford for undisclosed "disciplinary reasons", on 31 May 2017 Sercombe signed with Bristol Rovers for an undisclosed six-figure fee believed to be in the region of £150,000.

Sercombe made his debut on the opening day in a 1–0 defeat to Charlton Athletic. The following Tuesday Sercombe started in an EFL Cup game against Cambridge United in which Rovers won 4–1 with Sercombe scoring the fourth goal.

At the end of the 2019–20 season, after a successful spell at the club, Sercombe was released by Bristol Rovers.

=== Cheltenham Town ===
Following his release from Bristol Rovers, Cheltenham Town announced the signing of Sercombe on 4 August 2020. He made his debut for Cheltenham by scoring the winning goal in a 1–0 EFL Cup away victory over Peterborough United in September 2020.

Sercombe signed a new one-year deal with the club at the end of the 2021–22 season. During the 2023/24 season, Sercombe finished as Cheltenham's top goalscorer, with 11 goals. On 22 May 2024, the club announced he would be leaving in the summer when his contract expired. Sercombe left Cheltenham

=== Forest Green Rovers ===
On 24 May 2024, Sercombe agreed to join National League side Forest Green Rovers upon the expiration of his Cheltenham Town contract.

On 13 November 2025, Sercombe joined National League South club Weston-super-Mare on a one-month loan. On 8 May 2026, Forest Green announced it was releasing the player.

== Career statistics ==
As of match played 22 March 2025

Appearances and goals by club, season and competition
Club	Season	League			FA Cup		League Cup		Other		Total	
Club	Season	Division	Apps	Goals	Apps	Goals	Apps	Goals	Apps	Goals	Apps	Goals
Exeter City	2007–08	Conference National	7	0	0	0	—		0	0	7	0
Exeter City	2008–09	League Two	29	2	0	0	0	0	0	0	29	2
Exeter City	2009–10	League One	28	1	1	0	1	0	1 (Note: Appearances in Football League Trophy)	0	31	1
Exeter City	2010–11	League One	42	3	1	0	1	0	5	0	49	3
Exeter City	2011–12	League One	33	7	2	0	1	0	0	0	36	7
Exeter City	2012–13	League Two	20	1	1	0	1	0	1	0	23	1
Exeter City	2013–14	League Two	44	5	1	0	1	0	1	0	47	5
Exeter City	2014–15	League Two	40	4	1	0	0	0	0	0	41	4
Exeter City	Total		243	23	7	0	5	0	8	0	263	23
Oxford United	2015–16	League Two	45	14	5	2	2	1	6	0	58	17
Oxford United	2016–17	League One	30	3	4	0	2	1	7 (Note: Appearances in EFL Trophy)	1	43	5
Oxford United	Total		75	17	9	2	4	2	13	1	101	22
Bristol Rovers	2017–18	League One	42	8	1	1	3	1	2	2	48	12
Bristol Rovers	2018–19	League One	39	4	2	0	1	0	5	0	47	4
Bristol Rovers	2019–20	League One	22	1	6	1	1	0	3	1	22	3
Bristol Rovers	Total		103	13	9	2	5	1	10	3	127	19
Cheltenham Town	2020–21	League Two	38	7	2	1	2	1	0	0	42	9
Cheltenham Town	2021–22	League One	41	3	3	0	2	0	0	0	46	3
Cheltenham Town	2022–23	League One	41	1	1	0	1	0	5	3	48	4
Cheltenham Town	2023–24	League One	45	11	1	0	1	0	2	0	49	11
Cheltenham Town	Total		165	22	7	1	6	1	7	3	185	27
Forest Green Rovers	2024–25	National League	35	4	1	1	0	0	3	0	39	5
Career total			621	79	33	6	20	4	41	7	705	96

== Honours ==
Exeter City

- Football League Two second-place promotion: 2008–09
- Conference Premier play-offs: 2008

Oxford United

- Football League Two second-place promotion: 2015–16
- Football League Trophy / EFL Trophy runner-up: 2015–16, 2016–17

Cheltenham Town

- EFL League Two: 2020–21

Individual

- Bristol Rovers Player of the Year: 2017–18
- Cheltenham Town Player of the Year: 2023–24
