= Alex MacDonald (footballer, born 1990) =

Footballer (born 1990)

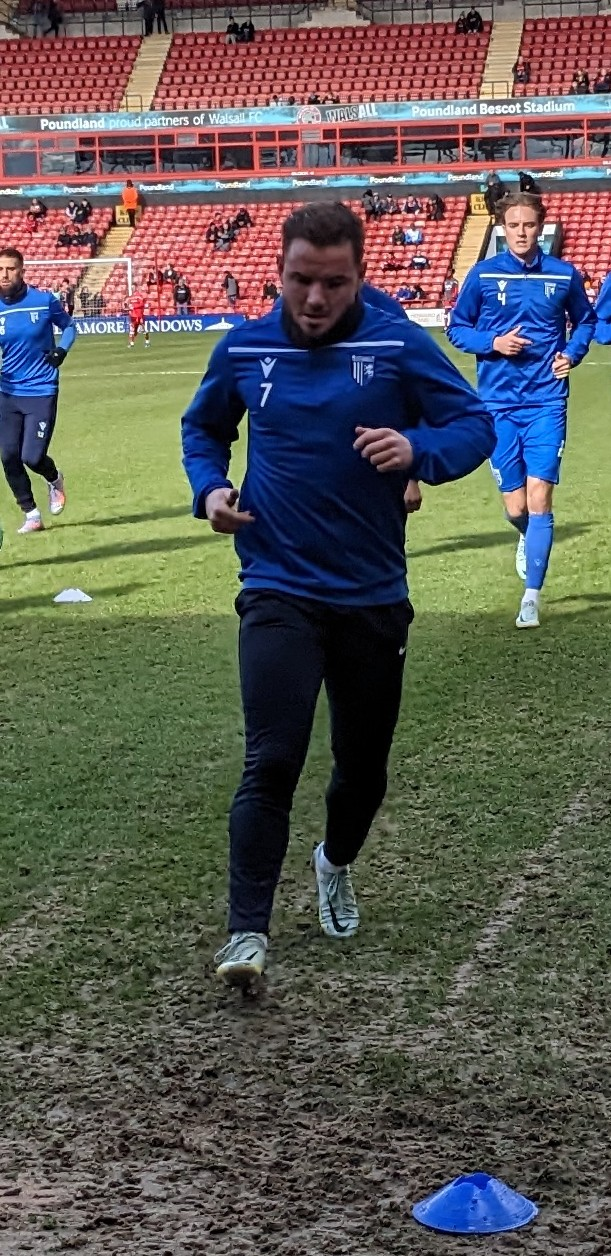
- MacDonald (wearing number 7) warming up for Gillingham in 2023

Personal information
- Full name: Alexander MacDonald
- Date of birth: 14 April 1990 (age 36)
- Place of birth: Warrington, England
- Height: 5 ft 7 in (1.70 m)
- Positions: Winger; forward

Youth career
- 2006–2008: Burnley

Senior career*
Years	Team	Apps	(Gls)
2008–2013	Burnley	11	(0)
2009	→ Falkirk (loan)	11	(0)
2011	→ Inverness Caledonian Thistle (loan)	10	(1)
2012	→ Plymouth Argyle (loan)	18	(4)
2012	→ Plymouth Argyle (loan)	16	(1)
2013	→ Burton Albion (loan)	15	(1)
2013–2015	Burton Albion	56	(7)
2015–2017	Oxford United	77	(9)
2017–2020	Mansfield Town	109	(6)
2020–2023	Gillingham	87	(4)
2023–2024	Stevenage	26	(2)
2024–2025	Rotherham United	15	(1)

International career
2008–2009	Scotland U19	8	(7)
2010–2012	Scotland U21	6	(1)
- * Club domestic league appearances and goals as of 20:18, 2 October 2025 (UTC)

Alexander MacDonald (born 14 April 1990) is a Scottish former professional footballer who played as a winger. His previous clubs include Stevenage, Burnley, Falkirk, Inverness Caledonian Thistle, Plymouth Argyle, Burton Albion, Oxford United, Mansfield Town and Gillingham. Born in England, he has represented Scotland at under-19 and under-21 level.

== Club career ==
=== Youth career ===
MacDonald started his career in the youth team at Burnley and signed a two-year scholarship in 2006, after previously having a trial at Liverpool. He impressed for the youth team and was voted Youth Team Player of the Year for the 2007–08 season, being rewarded with a professional contract in the summer of 2008.

=== Burnley ===
MacDonald made his debut on 26 April 2008, coming on as a substitute for Wade Elliott in the Championship 3–3 draw against Cardiff City in the final home game of the season. He also featured a week later in the final game of the season, a 5–0 defeat to Crystal Palace. In the 2008–09 season he featured mainly in the reserve side; however, he did make six appearances as a substitute for the first team, with his first coming in a 3–2 away win over Sheffield United. He also featured heavily in the FA Cup, making three appearances in the run to the sixth round, which came to an end in a 3–0 defeat against Arsenal.

When Burnley got promoted to the Premier League in May 2009 via the play-offs, MacDonald struggled to fight for a place in the team and joined Scottish Premier League side Falkirk on a six-month loan in July. He made his debut for the Bairns on 16 July 2009 in the Europa League second qualifying round tie first leg tie against FC Vaduz of Liechtenstein, starting the match in a 1–0 win. He made thirteen appearances in all competitions during his stay with the Scottish club, scoring no goals before returning to Turf Moor in January 2010. He suffered a double hernia injury towards the end of the season and did not feature for the rest of the campaign. He suffered greater troubles when his mother died in March, but he continued to train as usual with the first team as the Clarets were relegated from the Premier League.

MacDonald thought he would feature more in the 2010–11 season under Brian Laws in the Championship, but he did not find himself in contention for the first team and was again sent on loan to Scotland in January 2010, joining SPL side Inverness Caledonian Thistle until the end of the season. He made his first appearance for Terry Butcher's side on 5 February 2011, in 5–1 victory over Morton in the Scottish Cup second round, coming on as a substitute for Adam Rooney. He scored his first goal for the club 5 March 2011, scoring with his first touch in a 3–0 win over Motherwell in the SPL after coming on as a substitute.

After a very impressive pre-season in 2011, MacDonald finally broke back into the Burnley team on 20 August 2011, coming on as a late substitute for Ross Wallace in a 1–1 draw against Cardiff City. On 31 January 2012, he was loaned to League Two side Plymouth Argyle on an emergency loan until 6 March. MacDonald extended his loan with the club until the end of the campaign on 28 February.

On 31 August 2012, MacDonald re-signed for Plymouth Argyle until 6 October on an emergency loan. On 1 October, after his loan spell was extended, Alex expressed his liking for the club and the city by saying that he wanted a permanent move to Plymouth. On 4 December, he returned to Burnley from his loan spell. On 31 January 2013, he joined League Two side Burton Albion on an initial one-month loan.

=== Burton Albion ===
After his release from Burnley in May 2013, MacDonald joined Burton on a two-year contract.

=== Oxford United ===
On 2 February 2015, MacDonald joined Oxford United on a two-and-a-half-year contract. On 31 January 2017, he left Oxford by mutual consent. While with Oxford, he scored 12 goals in 97 appearances, 9 of them in league matches

=== Mansfield Town ===
MacDonald signed for Mansfield Town on 31 January 2017. He was released by Mansfield at the end of the 2019–20 season.

=== Gillingham ===
MacDonald signed for EFL League One side Gillingham on 14 August 2020. He made his debut for the Kent side on 5 September 2020 in a 1–0 win over Southend United in the first round of the EFL Cup.

Following the departure of manager Steve Evans from the club on 9 January 2022, he was appointed to assist caretaker manager Steve Lovell.

With his contract expiring at the end of the season, manager Neil Harris confirmed that the club were in conversation with Macdonald over an extension.

=== Stevenage ===
MacDonald signed for Stevenage in June 2023.

=== Rotherham United ===
On 24 June 2024, MacDonald agreed to join League One side Rotherham United on a one-year deal, linking up for a third spell with manager Steve Evans.

He departed the club at the end of the 2024–25 season.

== International career ==
MacDonald was born in England, but qualified to play for Scotland through his father. He scored in his second appearance for the under-19s against Azerbaijan on 20 October 2008 and scored two more against San Marino a couple of days later. In his fifth match for the team, against France on 25 February 2009, MacDonald captained the side and scored twice. In total, he received eight caps at under-19 level and scored seven goals. He made his under-21 debut on 17 November 2010 against Northern Ireland and scored his first goal for the team in his fourth appearance, against Luxembourg. He dedicated the goal to his mother, Janette, who died 18 months earlier at the age of 40.

== Career statistics ==
As of end of 2024–25 season

Appearances and goals by club, season and competition
Club	Season	League			FA Cup		League Cup		Other		Total	
Club	Season	Division	Apps	Goals	Apps	Goals	Apps	Goals	Apps	Goals	Apps	Goals
Burnley	2007–08	Championship	2	0	0	0	0	0	—		2	0
Burnley	2008–09	Championship	3	0	3	0	0	0	0	0	6	0
Burnley	2009–10	Premier League	0	0	0	0	0	0	—		0	0
Burnley	2010–11	Championship	0	0	0	0	0	0	—		0	0
Burnley	2011–12	Championship	5	0	1	0	1	0	—		7	0
Burnley	2012–13	Championship	1	0	0	0	1	0	—		2	0
Burnley	Total		11	0	4	0	2	0	0	0	17	0
Falkirk (loan)	2009–10	Scottish Premier League	11	0	0	0	0	0	2 (Note: Appearances in UEFA Europa League)	0	13	0
Inverness Caledonian Thistle (loan)	2010–11	Scottish Premier League	10	1	1	0	0	0	0	0	11	1
Plymouth Argyle (loan)	2011–12	League Two	18	4	0	0	0	0	0	0	18	4
Plymouth Argyle (loan)	2012–13	League Two	16	1	0	0	0	0	1 (Note: Appearances in Football League Trophy)	1	17	2
Plymouth Argyle (loan)	Total		34	5	0	0	0	0	1	1	35	6
Burton Albion (loan)	2012–13	League Two	15	1	0	0	0	0	2 (Note: Appearance in Football League Two play-offs)	0	17	1
Burton Albion	2013–14	League Two	35	0	3	0	1	0	2	0	41	0
Burton Albion	2014–15	League Two	21	7	1	0	2	0	1	0	25	7
Burton Albion	Total		71	8	4	0	3	0	5	0	83	8
Oxford United	2014–15	League Two	15	3	0	0	0	0	0	0	15	3
Oxford United	2015–16	League Two	40	5	4	0	2	0	6	1	52	6
Oxford United	2016–17	League One	22	1	4	1	2	0	2	1	30	3
Oxford United	Total		77	9	8	1	4	0	8	2	97	12
Mansfield Town	2016–17	League Two	18	1	0	0	0	0	0	0	18	1
Mansfield Town	2017–18	League Two	41	3	4	0	0	0	1 (Note: Appearances in EFL Trophy)	0	46	3
Mansfield Town	2018–19	League Two	21	1	0	0	2	0	3 (Note: One appearance in EFL Trophy, two appearances in League Two play-offs)	0	26	1
Mansfield Town	2019–20	League Two	29	1	1	0	0	0	3	0	33	1
Mansfield Town	Total		109	6	5	0	2	0	7	0	123	6
Gillingham	2020–21	League One	37	1	1	0	3	0	4	0	45	1
Gillingham	2021–22	League One	7	0	0	0	0	0	1	0	8	0
Gillingham	2022–23	League Two	43	2	5	0	4	0	3	0	55	2
Gillingham	Total		87	3	6	0	7	0	8	0	108	3
Stevenage	2023–24	League One	26	2	4	0	2	0	2	0	34	2
Rotherham United	2024–25	League One	15	1	1	0	2	0	1	0	19	1
Career total			451	35	34	1	22	0	34	3	540	39

== Honours ==
Burton Albion

- Football League Two: 2014–15

Oxford United

- Football League Trophy runner-up: 2015–16
