= Josimar Quintero =

Ecuadorian professional footballer (born 1997)

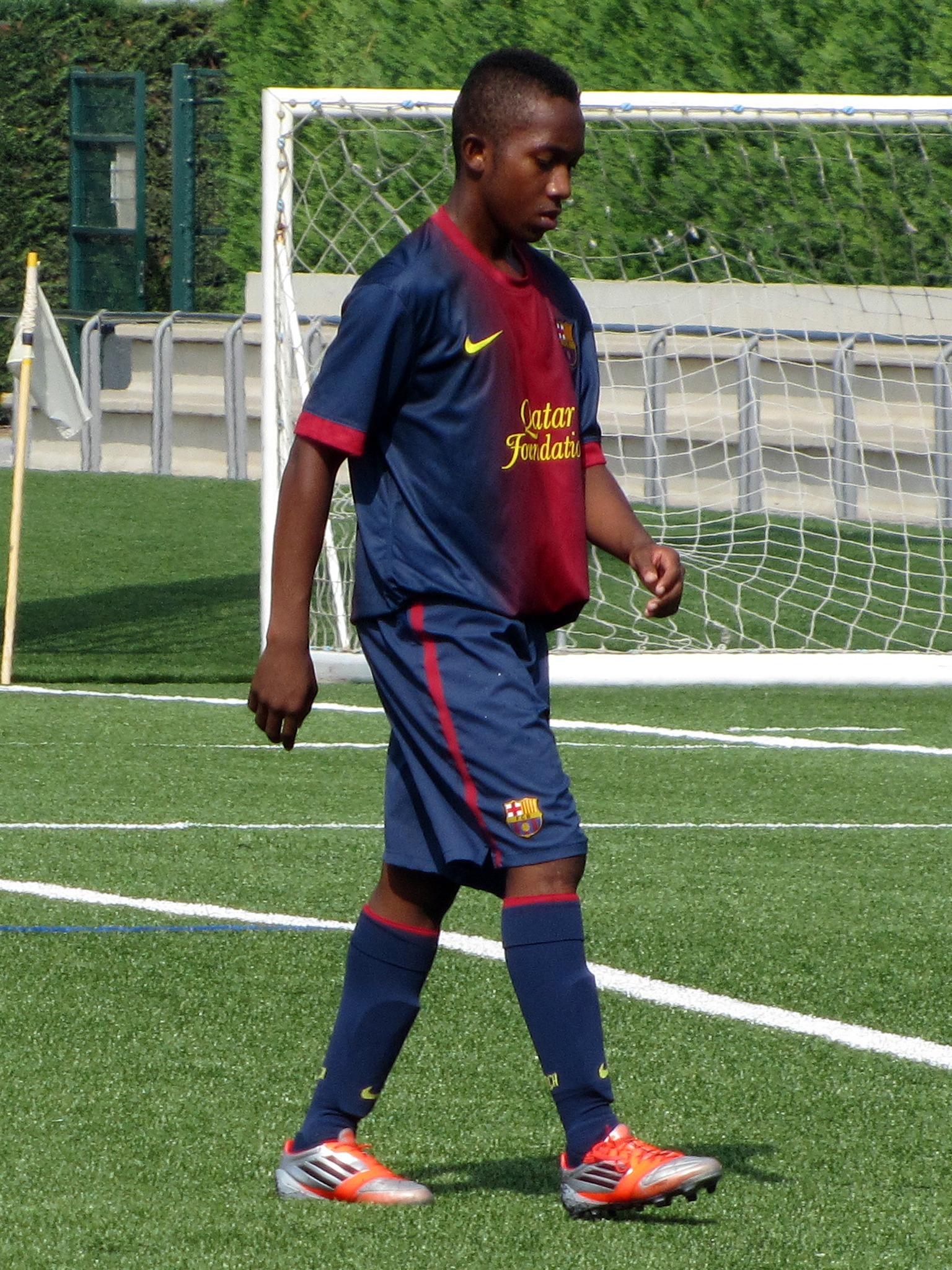
- Quintero in 2013

Personal information
- Full name: Josimar Aldair Quintero Quintero
- Date of birth: 3 February 1997 (age 29)
- Place of birth: Guayaquil, Ecuador
- Height: 1.63 m (5 ft 4 in)
- Position: Midfielder

Team information
- Current team: Gudja United
- Number: 17

Youth career
- 2005–2013: Barcelona
- 2013–2017: Chelsea

Senior career*
Years	Team	Apps	(Gls)
2017–2019	Chelsea		(0)
2017–2018	→ Rostov (loan)	0	(0)
2018	→ Betis B (loan)	0	(0)
2018–2019	→ Lleida Esportiu (loan)	0	(0)
2019–2020	Espanyol B	0	(0)
2020–2021	Real Monarchs	0	(0)
2024	Gudja United	0	(0)
2025	Rōnin FC	0	(0)

International career^{‡}
2016	Ecuador U20	1	(0)
- * Club domestic league appearances and goals as of May 13, 2024 ‡ National team caps and goals as of October 13, 2016

Josimar Aldair Quintero Quintero (Spanish pronunciation: [ɟʝosiˈmaɾ kinˈteɾo]; born 3 February 1997) is an Ecuadorian professional footballer who plays as a midfielder for Tercera Catalana side Rōnin FC.

== Club career ==
=== Chelsea ===
Born in Guayaquil, Quintero moved to Spain with his family at the age of five. He joined La Masia, the youth academy of Barcelona, at the age of eight. In 2013, it was reported that Arsenal and Tottenham Hotspur were interested in securing his services, but Quintero opted to join English club Chelsea in July 2014. However, due to paperwork and visa issues, Quintero was unable to play a competitive match for Chelsea until he turned 18. During the 2014–15 under-21 campaign, Quintero became a key figure in Adi Viveash's starting eleven, featuring eighteen times and scoring once in all competitions. He scored his first goal for the Chelsea academy in an UEFA Youth League encounter against Portuguese club Porto. Following his debut season in England, Quintero transitioned from a winger to a central midfielder.

On 5 July 2017, following reports suggesting Quintero was ready to leave Chelsea, he joined Russian club Rostov on a season-long loan. On 20 September 2017, Quintero made his Rostov debut during their cup tie against Volgar Astrakhan, replacing Žan Majer in their 2–0 away victory. On 2 January 2018, Rostov removed Quintero from their official squad list.

Following his return from Rostov, Quintero joined Spanish club Betis B in January 2018 on loan for the remainder of the campaign. The deal also included an option to purchase Quintero at the conclusion of the loan spell. On 4 March 2018, he made his Betis B debut during their 3–1 away defeat against Mérida, replacing Jesús Pozo in the 79th minute.

On 10 August 2018, Quintero agreed to join Spanish third-tier club Lleida Esportiu on a season-long loan.

=== Espanyol B ===
On 26 July 2019, Quintero signed for Segunda División B club Espanyol B on a one-year deal with an option of a two-year extension.

=== Real Monarchs ===
On 3 December 2020, Quintero moved to USL Championship side Real Monarchs.

=== Gudja United ===
After two years without a club, it was confirmed at the end of January 2024 that Quintero had signed with Maltese Premier League side Gudja United.

== Career statistics ==
As of match played 14 April 2024.

Club	Season	League			National Cup		League Cup		Continental		Other		Total	
Club	Season	Division	Apps	Goals	Apps	Goals	Apps	Goals	Apps	Goals	Apps	Goals	Apps	Goals
Chelsea	2017–18	Premier League	0	0	0	0	0	0	0	0	0	0	0	0
Rostov (loan)	2017–18	Russian Premier League	0	0	1	0	—		—		—		1	0
Betis B (loan)	2017–18	2ª B – Group 4	6	0	—		—		—		—		6	0
Lleida Esportiu (loan)	2018–19	2ª B – Group 3	16	0	2	0	—		—		—		18	0
Espanyol B	2019–20	2ª B – Group 3	10	0	—		—		—		—		10	0
Real Monarchs	2021	USL Championship	12	0	0	0	—		—		—		12	0
Gudja United	2023–24	Maltese Premier League	8	0	1	0	—		—		—		9	0
Career total			52	0	4	0	0	0	0	0	0	0	56	0
