= 2016 Football League Trophy final =

Football match

2016 Football League Trophy Final
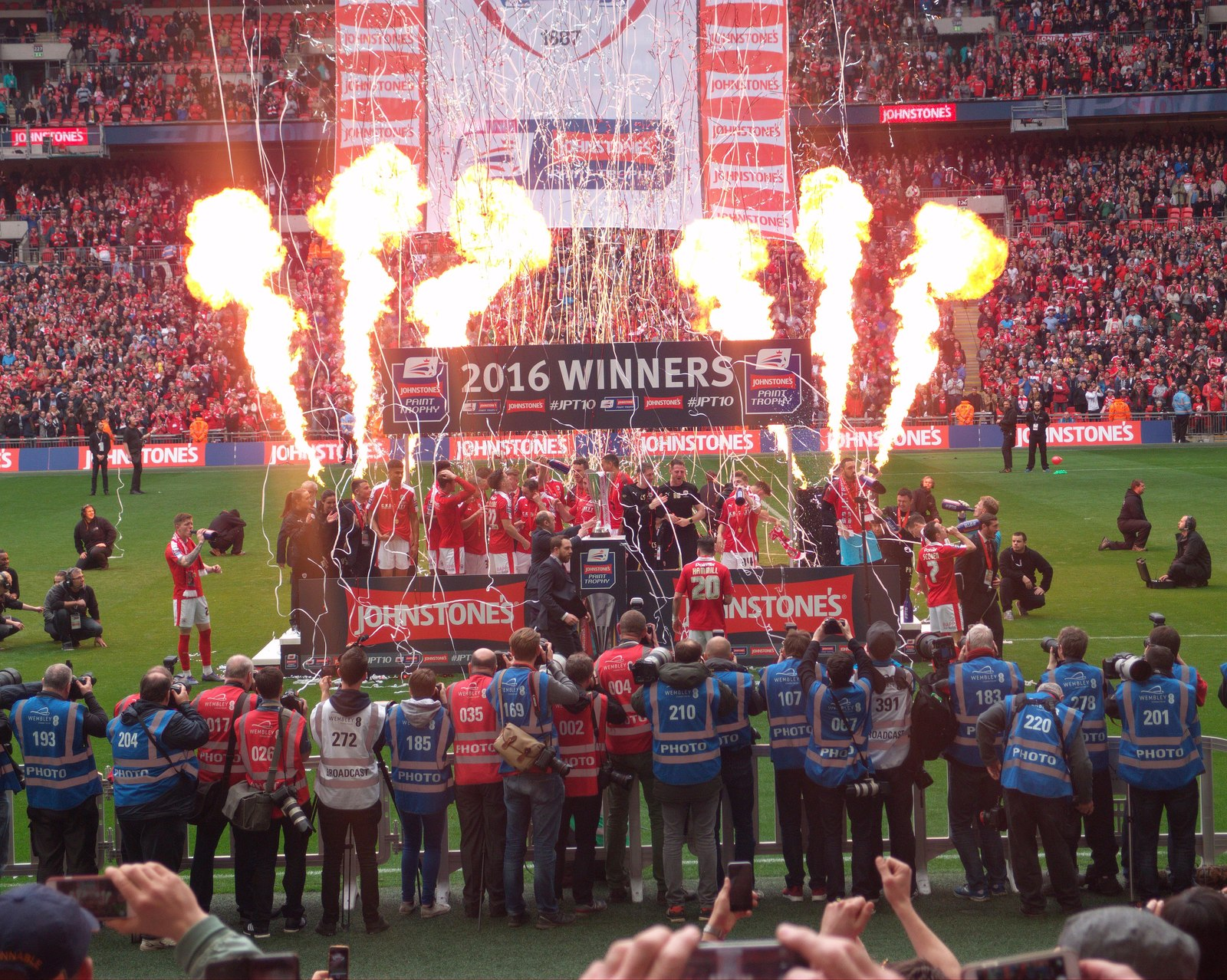
- Event: 2015–16 Football League Trophy
Barnsley	Oxford United
3	2
- Date: 3 April 2016
- Venue: Wembley Stadium, London
- Man of the Match: Adam Hammill (Barnsley)
- Referee: Andy Woolmer (Northamptonshire)
- Attendance: 59,230

The 2016 Football League Trophy Final was a football match played at Wembley Stadium on 3 April 2016 to decide the winners of the 2015–16 Football League Trophy, the 32nd edition of the Football League Trophy, a knock-out tournament for the 48 teams in League One and League Two.

It was played between Barnsley of League One and Oxford United of League Two, neither of whom had played in a League Trophy final before. Barnsley won 3–2. United led 1–0 at half-time through a goal from Callum O'Dowda. An own-goal by Chey Dunkley early in the second half was followed by goals from Ashley Fletcher and Adam Hammill to give Barnsley a two-goal cushion. A header from Danny Hylton in the 76th minute reduced the deficit, but United were unable to find an equaliser in the remaining minutes and suffered defeat at Wembley for the first time in their history.

== Match details ==
3 April 2016
14:30 GMT

Barnsley	3–2	Oxford United
Dunkley 52' (o.g.); Fletcher 68'; Hammill 74'	Report	O'Dowda 29'; Hylton 76'

Wembley Stadium, London
Attendance: 59,230
Referee: Andy Woolmer (Northamptonshire)

Barnsley	Oxford United

GK	1	(England) Adam Davies
RB	22	(England) George Williams
CB	4	(England) Marc Roberts
CB	26	(England) Alfie Mawson
LB	35	(Republic of Ireland) Aidan White
RM	34	(Wales) Lloyd Isgrove		(substituted off) 77'
CM	11	(England) Josh Brownhill
CM	8	(Republic of Ireland) Conor Hourihane (c)
LM	20	(England) Adam Hammill
CF	18	(England) Ashley Fletcher		(substituted off) 90+3'
CF	9	(England) Sam Winnall		(substituted off) 66'
Substitutes:
GK	13	(England) Nick Townsend
DF	2	(England) James Bree
DF	5	(Wales) Lewin Nyatanga
MF	7	(England) Josh Scowen		(substituted on) 77'
MF	15	(England) Marley Watkins
MF	32	(England) Harry Chapman		(substituted on) 90+3'
FW	24	(England) Ivan Toney	(yellow card) 90+7'	(substituted on) 66'
Manager:
(England) Paul Heckingbottom

GK	13	(Liechtenstein) Benjamin Büchel
RB	16	(England) Jonjoe Kenny
CB	5	(England) Johnny Mullins (c)
CB	33	(England) Chey Dunkley
LB	36	(Wales) Jordan Evans
RM	11	(Scotland) Alex MacDonald		(substituted off) 65'
CM	14	(England) Josh Ruffels
CM	8	(England) Liam Sercombe
LM	15	(Republic of Ireland) Callum O'Dowda		(substituted off) 85'
CF	4	(England) Kemar Roofe
CF	10	(England) Danny Hylton		(substituted off) 80'
Substitutes:
GK	1	(England) Sam Slocombe
DF	6	(England) Jake Wright
DF	22	(England) Sam Long
MF	24	(England) Josh Ashby
FW	7	(England) George Waring		(substituted on) 85'
FW	28	(Scotland) Chris Maguire	(yellow card) 81'	(substituted on) 65'
FW	29	(England) Jordan Bowery		(substituted on) 80'
Manager:
(England) Michael Appleton

== Post-match ==
Both Barnsley and Oxford United were promoted from their respective leagues at the end of the 2015–16 season. Winners Barnsley were promoted to the Championship, after beating Millwall 3–1 in the League One play-off final at Wembley Stadium on 29 May 2016. Runners-up Oxford United were promoted to League One, after finishing second in League Two, on 7 May 2016.
