= 2022–23 Oxford City F.C. season =

Oxford City F.C.
2022–23 season
- Chairman: Brian Cox
- Manager: Ross Jenkins
- Stadium: Marsh Lane
- FA Cup: First round

The 2022–23 season is the 140th season in the existence of Oxford City F. C. and the club's eighth season in National League South. In addition to the league, they will also compete in the 2022–23 FA Cup.

== First-team squad ==
No.	Player	Nationality	Date of birth	Signed From
GK
1	Ben Dudzinski	(England)	2 August 1995 (age 30)	(England) Sutton United
na	Alex Grantham	(England)		
DF
3	Lewis Miccio	(Australia)	2 December 1998 (age 27)	(England) Bedford Town
18	Aaron Williams-Bushell	(Barbados)	19 September 1999 (age 26)	(England) Maldon & Tiptree
5	Andre Burley	(Saint Kitts and Nevis)	10 September 1999 (age 26)	(England) Hungerford Town
15	Tom Harrison	(England)	28 January 2001 (age 24)	(England) Gloucester City
6	Charlie Rowan	(England)	14 December 1997 (age 28)	(England) Ebbsfleet United
19	Canice Carroll	(Republic of Ireland)	26 January 1999 (age 26)	(Scotland) Queen's Park
MF
4	Josh Ashby	(England)	3 May 1996 (age 29)	(England) Oxford United
7	Lewis Coyle	(England)		
8	Reece Fleet	(England)	28 January 1992 (age 33)	(England) Birmingham City
10	Zac McEachran	(England)	11 November 1995 (age 30)	(England) Banbury United
17	Jean-Baptiste Fischer	(France)	6 July 1998 (age 27)	(England) Wycombe Wanderers
20	Latrell Humphrey-Ewers	(England)	30 April 2004 (age 21)	
16	Alfie Potter	(England)	9 January 1989 (age 37)	(England) Billericay Town
FW
11	Klaidi Lolos	(Greece)	6 October 2000 (age 25)	(England) Torquay United
21	Gerald Muchechetere	(England)	6 September 2004 (age 21)	
9	Joe Iaciofano	(England)	9 September 1998 (age 27)	(England) Havant & Waterlooville
14	Josh Parker	(Antigua and Barbuda)	1 December 1990 (age 35)	(England) Burton Albion

== Transfers ==
=== In ===
Date	Pos	Player	Transferred from	Fee	Ref
29 June 2022	CB	(Saint Kitts and Nevis) Andre Burley	(England) Wycombe Wanderers	Free transfer	
19 July 2022	CF	(Greece) Klaidi Lolos	(England) Torquay United	Undisclosed	
20 July 2022	CB	(England) Tom Harrison	(England) Gloucester City	Undisclosed	
22 July 2022	LB	(Australia) Lewis Miccio	(England) Bedford Town	Undisclosed	
26 July 2022	RB	(Barbados) Aaron Williams-Bushell	(England) Maldon & Tiptree	Free transfer	
29 July 2022	CM	(France) Jean-Baptiste Fischer	(England) Wycombe Wanderers	Free transfer	
12 September 2022	CF	(Antigua and Barbuda) Josh Parker	(England) Burton Albion	Free Transfer	

=== Out ===
Date	Pos	Player	Transferred to	Fee	Ref
12 June 2022	CB	(England) Zico Asare	(England) Maidenhead United	Free transfer	
13 June 2022	CF	(England) Elliot Benyon	(England) Slough Town	Free transfer	
16 June 2022	CM	(England) Ewan Clark	(England) Bristol City	Undisclosed	
22 June 2022	LB	(England) George Harmon	(Scotland) Ross County	Free transfer	
4 July 2022	LM	(Ghana) Nana Owusu	(England) Dulwich Hamlet	Free transfer	
5 July 2022	CF	(England) Jacob Bancroft	(England) Billericay Town	Undisclosed	
8 July 2022	CB	(Japan) Dan Matsuzaka	(England) Weymouth	Undisclosed	
11 July 2022	CB	(Cyprus) Harry Kyprianou	(England) Weymouth	Undisclosed	
18 July 2022	RB	(Wales) Cole Dasilva	(England) Hemel Hempstead Town	Undisclosed	

== Pre-season and friendlies ==
Win Draw Loss Fixtures

2 July 2022 Friendly	Oxford City	2–5	Oxford United	Marston
18:30 BST	McEachran 5'; Ewers-Humphrey 50'	Report	Brannagan 13', 34'; Henry 18'; Long 38'; Browne 59'	Stadium: Velocity Stadium; Attendance: 1,118

12 July 2022 Friendly	Wycombe Wanderers	0–0	Oxford City	Marlow
18:00 BST		Report		Stadium: Wycombe Wanderers Training Ground

16 July 2022 Friendly	Stratford Town	0–4	Oxford City	Stratford-upon-Avon
16:00 BST		Report	Trialist D Iaciofano; Trilais E	Stadium: Arden Garages Stadium

23 July 2022 Friendly	Oxford City	1–1	Brackley Town	Marston
19:45 BST	Coyle	Report	York	Stadium: Velocity Stadium

30 July 2022 Friendly	Oxford City	3–3	Gloucester City	Marston
15:00 BST	Iaciofano 7', 32'; Lolos 73'	Report	McClure 11'; Tomlinson 23'; James 81'	Stadium: Velocity Stadium

== Competitions ==
=== Overall record ===
Competition	First match	Last match	Starting round	Record							
Competition	First match	Last match	Starting round	Pld	W	D	L	GF	GA	GD	Win %
National League South	6 August 2022	29 April 2023	Matchday 1	0	0	0	0	0	0	+0	—
FA Cup	TBC	TBC	Third round	0	0	0	0	0	0	+0	—
Total				0	0	0	0	0	0	+0	—

Last updated: pre-season
Source: [ Soccerway]

=== Natiaonal League South ===
2022–23 National League South

==== League table ====
Pos	Team	Pld	W	D	L	GF	GA	GD	Pts	Promotion, qualification or relegation
1	Ebbsfleet United (C, P)	46	32	7	7	110	47	+63	103	Promotion to National League
2	Dartford	46	25	8	13	82	50	+32	83	Qualification for the National League South play-off semi-finals
3	Oxford City (O, P)	46	21	15	10	83	56	+27	78	Qualification for the National League South play-off semi-finals
4	Worthing	46	22	12	12	92	72	+20	78	Qualification for the National League South play-off quarter-finals
5	Chelmsford City	46	23	9	14	67	49	+18	78	Qualification for the National League South play-off quarter-finals

Source: National League official site
Rules for classification: 1) Points; 2) Goal difference; 3) Number of goals scored; 4) Number of matches won; 5) Head-to-head results
(C) Champions; (O) Play-off winners; (P) Promoted

==== Results summary ====
Overall								Home						Away					
Pld	W	D	L	GF	GA	GD	Pts	W	D	L	GF	GA	GD	W	D	L	GF	GA	GD
7	4	0	3	11	9	+2	12	2	0	1	8	3	+5	2	0	2	3	6	−3

Last updated: 24 August 2022.
Source: [ Soccerway]

==== Results by round ====
Round	1	2	3	4	5	6	7	8	9
Ground	H	A	A	H	A	H	A	H	A
Result	L	W	L	W	W	W	L	P	L
Position	21	13	18	9	6	5	8		8

Updated to match(es) played on 16 August 2022. Source: [ Soccerway]
A = Away; H = Home; W = Win; D = Draw; L = Loss; P = Postponed

==== Matches ====
Win Draw Loss Fixtures

On 23 June, the league fixtures were announced.

6 August 2022 1	Oxford City	1–3	Eastbourne Borough	Marston
15:00 BST	Lolos 47'	Report	Hammond pen.' (4); Dickenson 25'; Luer 29'	Stadium: RAW Charging Stadium; Attendance: 312; Referee: Oliver Mackey

13 August 2022 2	St Albans	0–1	Oxford City	St Albans
15:00 BST		Report	Ashby 78'	Stadium: Clarence Park; Attendance: 778; Referee: Robert Claussen

6 September 2022 3	Chippenham Town F.C.	1-0	Oxford City	Chippenham
19:45 BST	Young 90+4' (pen.)	Report		Stadium: Hardenhuish Park; Attendance: 443; Referee: Dale Wootton

20 August 2022 4	Oxford City	5–0	Concord Rangers	Marston
15:00 BST	Muchechetere 1', 27'; Lolos 15', 77'; Fischer 87'	Report		Stadium: RAW Charging Stadium; Attendance: 260; Referee: Lewis Sandoe

27 August 2022 5	Weymouth	0–2	Oxford City	Weymouth
15:00 BST		Report	Coyle 7'; Lolos pen.' (77)	Stadium: Bob Lucas Stadium; Attendance: 730; Referee: Neil Pratt

27 August 2022 6	Oxford City	2–0	Hampton & Richmond	Marston
15:00 BST	Lolos pen.' (45); Aaron Williams-Bushell 87'	Report		Stadium: RAW Charging Stadium; Attendance: 552; Referee: Abigail Bryne

3 September 2022 7	Welling United	5–0	Oxford City	Welling
15:00 BST	Azeez 9', 32', 44'; Payne 41', 70'	Report		Stadium: Park View Road; Attendance: 945; Referee: Stephen Parkinson

1 November 2022 8	Oxford City	2-0	Hungerford Town	Marston
19:45 BST	Parker 38'; Rowan 59'	Report		Stadium: RAW Charging Stadium; Attendance: 251; Referee: Matthew Norton
Note: Fixture was postponed as a mark of respect following the death of Elizabeth II.

12 September 2022 9	Chelmsford City	1-0	Oxford City	Chelmsford
19:45 BST	Oluwo 90'	Report		Stadium: Melbourne Stadium; Attendance: 1043; Referee: Farai Hallam

24 September 2022 10	Oxford City	3-3	Bath City	Marston
15:00 BST	Parker 7', 42'; Lolos pen.' (20)	Report	Mannings 62'; Fletcher 67'; Cooke pen.' (70)	Stadium: RAW Charging Stadium; Attendance: 551; Referee: Jamie O'Connor

27 September 2022 11	Oxford City	1-1	Ebbsfleet	Marston
19:45 BST	Sanderson 47'	Report	Bingham 35'	Stadium: RAW Charging Stadium; Attendance: 392; Referee: Steven Hughes

8 October 2022 12	Tonbridge	2-2	Oxford City	Tonbridge
15:00 BST	Soares-Junior 53'; Santos 67'	Report	Ashby 26'; Parker 45'	Stadium: Halcyon Wealth Longmead Stadium; Attendance: 1073; Referee: Aaron Farmer

15 November 2022 13	Oxford City	3-1	Dover Athletic	Marston
19:45 BST	Iaciofano 16'; Ashby 33'; McEachran 38'	Report	Nikaj 90'	Stadium: RAW Charging Stadium; Attendance: 364; Referee: Date Wooton

22 October 2022 14	Havant & Waterlooville	0-1	Oxford City	Havant
15:00 BST		Report	Ashby 90+1'	Stadium: Draper Tools Community Stadium; Attendance: 950; Referee: Oliver Mackey

25 October 2022 15	Oxford City	2-1	Taunton Town	Marston
19:45 BST	Burley 20'; Iaciofano pen' (90+3)	Report	Sims-Burgess 39'	Stadium: RAW Charging Stadium; Attendance: 374; Referee: Samuel Read

30 October 2022 16	Farnborough	2-1	Oxford City	Farnborough
19:45 BST	Kasimu 19' (25)	Report	Carbon 77'	Stadium: Cherrywood Road; Attendance: 622; Referee: Jonathan Maskrey

22 November 2022 17	Oxford City	Postponed	Dartford	Marston
19:45 BST				Stadium: RAW Charging Stadium

8 November 2022 18	Worthing	1-0	Oxford City	Worthing
15:00 BST	Kealey 63'	Report		Stadium: Crucial Environmental Stadium; Attendance: 683; Referee: Steven Hughes

12 November 2022 19	Oxford City	2-2	Hemel Hempstead	Marston
15:00 BST	Parker' (45+3); Parker-Bushell' (71)	Report	Holness' (25); Castoglione' (59)	Stadium: RAW Charging Stadium; Attendance: 243; Referee: Liam Corbett

26 November 2022 20	Cheshunt	v	Oxford City
15:00 BST

== Play-offs ==
7 May 2023 Semi Final	Oxford City	2-0	Worthing	Marston
15:30 BST				Stadium: RAW Charging Stadium; Attendance: 2,017

14 May 2023 Final	Oxford City	4-0	St Albans City	Marston
12:30 BST				Stadium: RAW Charging Stadium; Attendance: 3,100

=== FA Cup ===
Win Draw Loss Fixtures

17/9/2022 Second qualifying round	Salisbury	1-2	Oxford City	Salisbury
15:00	Fitchett 90+3'	Report	Sanderson 59'; Coyle 61'	Stadium: Raymond McEnhill Stadium; Attendance: 451

1/10/2022 Third qualifying round	Oxford City	1-1	Plymouth Parkway	Marston
15:00	Caroll 90+1'	Report	Crago 83'	Stadium: RAW Charging Stadium; Attendance: 276

4/10/2022 Third qualifying round replay	Plymouth Parkway	1-3 (a.e.t.)	Oxford City	Plymouth
15:00	Palfray 36'	Report	Parker 90+1', 120+1'; Lolos 92'	Stadium: Bolitho Park; Attendance: 319

15/10/2022 Fourth qualifying round	Hornchurch	1-4	Oxford City	Upminster
15:00	Munns 34'	Report	Lolos 45+3'; Fleet 58'; Parker 63', 90+1'	Stadium: Hornchurch Stadium; Attendance: 825; Referee: George Laflin

5/11/2022 First round proper	Fleetwood Town	3-1	Oxford City	Fleetwood
15:00	Warrington 14'; Lane 44', 84'	Report	Potter 81'	Stadium: Highbury Stadium; Attendance: 1,357; Referee: Aaron Jackson

== Top scorers ==
As of 16 August 2022

Place	Position	Nation	Number	Name	National League South	FA Cup	Total
1	F	(Antigua and Barbuda)	14	Josh Parker	5	4	9
2	F	(Greece)	11	Klaidi Lolos	6	2	8
3	M	(England)	4	Josh Ashby	4	0	4
4	F	(England)	21	Gerald Muchechetere	2	0	2
4	M	(England)	7	Lewis Coyle	1	1	2
4	D	(England)	18	Aaron Williams-Bushell	2	0	2
4	F	(England)	9	Joe Iaciofano	2	0	2
5	M	(France)	17	Jean-Baptiste Fischer	1	0	1
5	D	(England)	12	Oliver Sanderson	1	1	1
5	D	(Republic of Ireland)	19	Canice Carroll	0	1	1
5	M	(England)	8	Reece Fleet	0	1	1
5	D	(England)	5	Andre Burley	1	0	1
5	F	(England)	na	Jayden Carbon	1	0	1
5	D	(England)	6	Charlie Rowan	1	0	1
5	D	(England)	6	Alfie Potter	0	1	1
5	M	(England)	10	Alfie Potter	1	0	1
TOTALS					18	10	28
