= 2015–16 Oxford United F.C. season =

English football club season

Oxford United
2015–16 season
- Chairman: Darryl Eales
- Head Coach: Michael Appleton
- Stadium: Kassam Stadium
- League Two: 2nd (promoted)
- FA Cup: 4th round (eliminated by Blackburn Rovers)
- League Cup: 2nd round (eliminated by Sheffield Wednesday)
- League Trophy: Runners-up (beaten by Barnsley)
- Top goalscorer: League: Roofe (18); All: Roofe (26)
- Highest home attendance: 11,815 v Wycombe Wanderers, 7 May 2016
- Lowest home attendance: 2,532 v Yeovil Town, 8 December 2015

The 2015–16 season was Oxford United's sixth consecutive season in League Two and 122nd year in existence. As well as competing in League Two, the club also participated in the FA Cup, League Cup and League Trophy. The season covers the period from 1 July 2015 to 30 June 2016.

After spending most of the season in the top three, Oxford finally confirmed automatic promotion to League One on the last day of the regular season, with a 3–0 home victory over Wycombe Wanderers. The Us finished in second place with 86 points, 13 behind runaway leaders Northampton Town. Oxford's 14 away wins in the league set a new club record for a single season. Midfielder Kemar Roofe was the club's leading scorer, with 18 league goals and 26 in all competitions.

United beat higher-division opposition in all three senior cup competitions and reached the final of the League Trophy at Wembley Stadium, only the club's third appearance at the national stadium. In the opening round of the League Cup they eliminated Brentford of the Championship with a 4–0 away win, before losing 1–0 to another Championship side, Sheffield Wednesday, in the second round. They reached the fourth round of the FA Cup, recording a notable 3–2 victory over Premier League side Swansea City in the third round, but were knocked out of the competition by Blackburn Rovers in the next round. In their run to the final of the League Trophy, they beat local rivals Swindon Town of League One in the second round, and Millwall, also of League One, over two legs in the area semi-final, before losing 3–2 to Barnsley in the final. United won the Oxfordshire Senior Cup, beating Oxford City 6–1 in the final, three days after securing their league promotion.

== Transfers ==
=== Transfers in ===
Date from	Position	Nationality	Name	From	Fee	Ref.
1 July 2015	AM	ENG	Kemar Roofe	West Bromwich Albion	Undisclosed	
1 July 2015	CM	ENG	Liam Sercombe	Exeter City	Free transfer	
1 July 2015	GK	ENG	Sam Slocombe	Scunthorpe United	Free transfer	
1 July 2015	CF	ENG	Ryan Taylor	Portsmouth	Free transfer	
13 August 2015	CM	ENG	John Lundstram	Everton	Free transfer	
4 September 2015	GK	LIE	Benjamin Büchel	AFC Bournemouth	Free transfer	
21 September 2015	LW	ENG	Jonny Giles	Free agent	Free transfer	
6 November 2015	DF	ENG	Cameron Gayle	Free agent	Free transfer	
22 January 2016	FW	ENG	Jordan Bowery	Rotherham United	Free transfer	
1 February 2016	FW	SCO	Chris Maguire	Rotherham United	Free transfer	

=== Transfers out ===
Date from	Position	Nationality	Name	To	Fee	Ref.
1 July 2015	CF	FRA	Jeremy Balmy	Swindon Town (Note: Following Balmy's release he joined Swindon Town.)	Released	
1 July 2015	CB	ENG	Matt Bevans	Wealdstone (Note: Following Bevans' release he joined Wealdstone.)	Released	
1 July 2015	CF	ENG	John Campbell	Free Agent	Released	
1 July 2015	CF	ENG	Will Hoskins	Exeter City (Note: Following Hoskins' release he joined Exeter City.)	Free transfer	
1 July 2015	LB	WAL	Jonathan Meades	AFC Wimbledon (Note: Following Meades' release he joined AFC Wimbledon.)	Free transfer	
1 July 2015	RW	ENG	Josh Shama	Free agent	Released	
1 July 2015	RB	ENG	Andy Whing	Retired	—N/a	
2 July 2015	GK	ENG	Ryan Clarke	Northampton Town (Note: Following Clarke's release he joined Northampton Town.)	Free transfer	
7 January 2016	MF	IRE	Michael Collins	Bengaluru FC (Note: Following Collins' release he joined Bengaluru.)	Released	
1 February 2016	MF	ENG	Danny Rose	Northampton Town (Note: Following Rose's release he joined Northampton Town.)	Released	
7 March 2016	MF	ENG	Aidan Hawtin	Valdres FK	Released	
7 March 2016	MF	ENG	Sam Humphreys	Valdres FK	Released	
31 May 2016	DF	ENG	Johnny Mullins	Luton Town	Released	
31 May 2016	DF	ENG	Danny Hylton	Luton Town	Released	

=== Loans in ===
Date from	Position	Nationality	Name	From	Date until	Ref.
1 July 2015	RB	ENG	George Baldock	Milton Keynes Dons	28 January 2016 (Note: Baldock's loan was initially for the whole season, but a recall clause was exercised by his parent club.)	
28 September 2015	RW	ENG	Jordan Graham	Wolverhampton Wanderers	27 October 2015 (Note: Graham's initial one-month loan was extended for a further two months, but he was recalled by his parent club.)	
26 November 2015	DF	WAL	Jordan Evans	Fulham	May 2016 (Note: Evans' loan was twice extended.)	
26 November 2015	FW	SCO	Chris Maguire	Rotherham United	17 January 2016 (Note: Maguire was released by Rotherham and signed a permanent contract with Oxford on 1 February.)	
27 January 2016	DF	ENG	Jonjoe Kenny	Everton	May 2016 (Note: Kenny's loan was twice extended.)	
1 February 2016	MF	ENG	Zeli Ismail	Wolverhampton Wanderers	2 March 2016	
23 February 2016	FW	ENG	George Waring	Stoke City	May 2016	

=== Loans out ===
Date from	Position	Nationality	Name	To	Date until	Ref.
7 August 2015	RB	ENG	Aidan Hawtin	Hayes & Yeading United	4 September 2015	
7 August 2015	LB	ENG	Miles Welch-Hayes	North Leigh	4 September 2015	
18 September 2015	GK	NZL	Max Crocombe	Barnet	18 October 2015	
29 September 2015	CM	ENG	Josh Ashby	AFC Telford United	25 October 2015	
29 September 2015	FW	ENG	James Roberts	Chester	3 December 2015	
30 September 2015	MF	ENG	Aidan Hawtin	Brackley Town	3 December 2015	
2 October 2015	MF	IRE	Michael Collins	York City	one month	
13 October 2015	DF	ENG	Freddie Grant	Farnborough	November 2015	
16 October 2015	GK	NZL	Max Crocombe	Southport	January 2016	
24 November 2015	DF	ENG	Cameron Gayle	Cambridge United	24 January 2016	
4 December 2015	MF	ENG	Josh Ashby	Brackley Town	4 January 2016	
29 January 2016	FW	ENG	James Roberts	Oxford City	February 2016	
29 January 2016	FW	ENG	Jonny Giles	Southport	February 2016	
1 February 2016	FW	IRE	Patrick Hoban	Stevenage	March 2016	
29 February 2016	FW	IRE	Patrick Hoban	Grimsby Town	May 2016	
29 February 2016	FW	ENG	James Roberts	Barnet	March 2016	

== Competitions ==
=== Pre-season friendlies ===
On 18 May 2015, Oxford United announced four pre-season friendlies against Didcot Town, Woking, Eastleigh and Coventry City. On 29 May 2015, Oxford United announced a trip to Austria for a week-long stay, which included a friendly against SC Wiener Neustadt.

11 July 2015 Friendly	Didcot Town	0–5	Oxford United	Didcot
15:00 BST		Report	Roofe 26', 36'; Hylton 51', 79'; Ashby 88'	Stadium: Draycott Engineering Loop Meadow Stadium; Attendance: 940

14 July 2015 Friendly	SC Wiener Neustadt	0–0	Oxford United	Wiener Neustadt, Austria
18:30 CEST		Report		Stadium: Stadion Wiener Neustadt

21 July 2015 Friendly	Woking	1–0	Oxford United	Woking
19:45 BST	Goddard 56'	Report		Stadium: Kingfield Stadium; Attendance: 817

25 July 2015 Friendly	Eastleigh	0–2	Oxford United	Eastleigh
15:00 BST		Report	Mullins 44'; Hylton 45'	Stadium: Ten Acres; Attendance: 1,193

28 July 2015 Friendly	Thame United	0–4	Oxford United	Thame
19:00 BST		Report	Hoban 25', 54'; O'Dowda 29'; Humphreys 76'	Stadium: ASM Stadium

1 August 2015 Friendly	Oxford United	0–0	Coventry City	Nuneaton
15:00 BST		Report		Stadium: Liberty Way; Attendance: 878

=== League Two ===
==== League table ====
Pos	Team	Pld	W	D	L	GF	GA	GD	Pts	Promotion, qualification or relegation
1	Northampton Town (C, P)	46	29	12	5	82	46	+36	99	Promotion to EFL League One
2	Oxford United (P)	46	24	14	8	84	41	+43	86	Promotion to EFL League One
3	Bristol Rovers (P)	46	26	7	13	77	46	+31	85	Promotion to EFL League One
4	Accrington Stanley	46	24	13	9	74	48	+26	85	Qualification for League Two play-offs (Note: Four teams play for one spot and promotion to Football League One.)
5	Plymouth Argyle	46	24	9	13	72	46	+26	81	Qualification for League Two play-offs

Updated to match(es) played on 7 May 2016. Source: BBC Sport
Rules for classification: 1) Points; 2) Goal difference; 3) Number of goals scored
(C) Champions; (P) Promoted

==== Matches ====
On 17 June 2015, the fixtures for the forthcoming season were announced.

8 August 2015 1	Oxford United	1–1	Crawley Town	Oxford
15:00 BST	Hylton 65'	Report	Edwards 56'	Stadium: Kassam Stadium; Attendance: 6,349; Referee: Jeremy Simpson

15 August 2015 2	Luton Town	2–2	Oxford United	Luton
15:00 BST	Wilkinson 42'; McGeehan 69'	Report	Roofe 82'; Hoban 90+3'	Stadium: Kenilworth Road; Attendance: 8,877; Referee: Mark Brown

18 August 2015 3	Oxford United	3–1	Notts County	Oxford
19:45 BST	O'Dowda 36'; Roofe 49'; Hylton 79'	Report	Audel 21'	Stadium: Kassam Stadium; Attendance: 5,774; Referee: Robert Lewis

22 August 2015 4	Mansfield Town	1–1	Oxford United	Mansfield
15:00 BST	Westcarr 3'	Report	Roofe 58' (pen.)	Stadium: Field Mill; Attendance: 3,112; Referee: Ben Toner

29 August 2015 5	Oxford United	2–0	Yeovil Town	Oxford
15:00 BST	Hylton 14'; O'Dowda 75'	Report		Stadium: Kassam Stadium; Attendance: 6,018; Referee: Kevin Johnson

6 September 2015 6	Bristol Rovers	0–1	Oxford United	Horfield
12:15 BST	O. Clarke (red card) 17'	Report	Roofe 62'; Sercombe (red card) 59'	Stadium: Memorial Stadium; Attendance: 7,038; Referee: James Linington

12 September 2015 7	Northampton Town	1–0	Oxford United	Northampton
15:00 BST	Taylor (red card) 44'; Hoskins 23'	Report		Stadium: Sixfields Stadium; Attendance: 4,838; Referee: Neil Swarbrick

19 September 2015 8	Oxford United	1–1	Portsmouth	Oxford
15:00 BST	Sercombe 33'	Report	McGurk 61'	Stadium: Kassam Stadium; Attendance: 9,093; Referee: Iain Williamson

26 September 2015 9	Oxford United	0–0	Morecambe	Oxford
15:00 BST		Report		Stadium: Kassam Stadium; Attendance: 5,273; Referee: Tim Robinson

29 September 2015 10	York City	1–2	Oxford United	York
19:45 BST	Turner 38'	Report	Hylton 9'; Roofe 71'	Stadium: Bootham Crescent; Attendance: 2,791; Referee: David Webb

3 October 2015 11	Accrington Stanley	1–3	Oxford United	Accrington
15:00 BST	Crooks 70'	Report	O'Dowda 21'; Sercombe 79' 87' (pen.)	Stadium: Crown Ground; Attendance: 1,755; Referee: Mark Haywood

10 October 2015 12	Oxford United	1–0	AFC Wimbledon	Oxford
15:00 BST	Baldock 80'	Report		Stadium: Kassam Stadium; Attendance: 6,301; Referee: Fred Graham

17 October 2015 13	Leyton Orient	2–2	Oxford United	Leyton
15:00 BST	Simpson 64'; Kashket 90'	Report	Roofe 16'; Lundstram 33'	Stadium: Brisbane Road; Attendance: 6,296; Referee: Ross Joyce

20 October 2015 14	Oxford United	1–0	Plymouth Argyle	Oxford
19:45 BST	Sercombe 32'	Report		Stadium: Kassam Stadium; Attendance: 7,007; Referee: Keith Stroud

24 October 2015 15	Oxford United	2–3	Barnet	Oxford
15:00 BST	Sercombe 14' 40'	Report	Weston 26'; Akinde 29'; Clarke 31'	Stadium: Kassam Stadium; Attendance: 6,137; Referee: Darren Handley

31 October 2015 16	Stevenage	1–5	Oxford United	Stevenage
15:00 GMT	Whelpdale 17'	Report	Taylor 13' 72'; Sercombe 27' (pen.); MacDonald 66'; Roofe 75'	Stadium: Broadhall Way; Attendance: 3,412; Referee: Lee Swabey

14 November 2015 17	Oxford United	1–0	Cambridge United	Oxford
15:00 GMT	Taylor 32'	Report		Stadium: Kassam Stadium; Attendance: 6,958; Referee: Keith Hill

21 November 2015 18	Dagenham & Redbridge	0–1	Oxford United	Dagenham
15:00 GMT		Report	Roofe 85'	Stadium: Victoria Road; Attendance: 1,980; Referee: Kevin Johnson

24 November 2015 19	Oxford United	1–1	Newport County	Oxford
19:45 GMT	Hoban 72'	Report	John-Lewis 43'	Stadium: Kassam Stadium; Attendance: 5,479; Referee: Andy Madley

28 November 2015 20	Hartlepool United	0–1	Oxford United	Hartlepool
15:00 GMT		Report	Hylton 70'	Stadium: Victoria Park; Attendance: 3,622; Referee: Seb Stockbridge

12 December 2015 21	Oxford United	1–1	Carlisle United	Oxford
15:00 GMT	MacDonald 34'	Report	Dunkley 45' (o.g.)	Stadium: Kassam Stadium; Attendance: 5,936; Referee: Mark Haywood

19 December 2015 22	Wycombe Wanderers	2–1	Oxford United	High Wycombe
15:00 GMT	Thompson 50'; McCarthy 76'	Report	Sercombe 65'	Stadium: Adams Park; Attendance: 5,742; Referee: Neil Swarbrick

26 December 2015 23	Oxford United	3–0	Exeter City	Oxford
15:00 GMT	Lundstram 48'; Baldock 67'; Sercombe 90'	Report		Stadium: Kassam Stadium; Attendance: 9,683; Referee: Graham Salisbury

28 December 2015 24	Yeovil Town	0–0	Oxford United	Yeovil
15:00 GMT		Report		Stadium: Huish Park; Attendance: 4,661; Referee: Steve Martin

2 January 2016 25	Notts County	2–4	Oxford United	Nottingham
15:00 GMT	Stead 61'; Thompson 76'	Report	Sercombe 45' (pen.); Macdonald 79'; O'Dowda 90'; Roofe 90'	Stadium: Meadow Lane; Attendance: 5,877; Referee: Carl Boyeson

17 January 2016 26	Oxford United	1–2	Bristol Rovers	Oxford
15:00 GMT	Roofe 46'	Report	Taylor 52'; Harrison 88' (pen.)	Stadium: Kassam Stadium; Attendance: 9,492; Referee: Nick Kinseley

23 January 2016 27	Portsmouth	0–1	Oxford United	Portsmouth
15:00 GMT		Report	Bowery 76'	Stadium: Fratton Park; Attendance: 17,840; Referee: Neil Swarbrick

9 February 2016 28	Oxford United	2–2	Mansfield Town	Oxford
19:45 GMT	Hylton 30', 69'	Report	Green 22'; Thomas 89'	Stadium: Kassam Stadium; Attendance: 5,346; Referee: James Linington

13 February 2016 29	Morecambe	2–4	Oxford United	Morecambe
15:00 GMT	Molyneux 23'; Miller (red card) 70'; Barkhuizen 90+1'	Report	Roofe 9'; Lundstram 71'; Hylton 74'; Bowery 80'	Stadium: Globe Arena; Attendance: 1,749; Referee: Peter Bankes

16 February 2016 30	Oxford United	0–1	Northampton Town	Oxford
19:45 GMT		Report	Richards 59' (pen.)	Stadium: Kassam Stadium; Attendance: 9,559; Referee: Keith Hill

20 February 2016 31	Oxford United	1–2	Accrington Stanley	Oxford
15:00 GMT	Roofe 29'	Report	Kee 46'; Brown 88'	Stadium: Kassam Stadium; Attendance: 6,792; Referee: Lee Swabey

23 February 2016 32	Exeter City	1–4	Oxford United	Exeter
17:45 GMT	Nicholls 77'	Report	Dunkley 8'; Bowery 41', 59'; MacDonald 62'	Stadium: St James Park; Attendance: 3,089; Referee: Simon Hooper

27 February 2016 33	AFC Wimbledon	1–2	Oxford United	Norbiton
15:00 GMT	Barcham 33'	Report	Hylton 5'; Bowery 59'	Stadium: Kingsmeadow; Attendance: 4,628; Referee: Kevin Wright

1 March 2016 34	Oxford United	4–0	York City	Oxford
15:00 GMT	Bowery 16'; Dunkley 72'; Hylton 79'; Roofe 85'	Report		Stadium: Kassam Stadium; Attendance: 5,654; Referee: Oliver Langford

5 March 2016 35	Plymouth Argyle	2–2	Oxford United	Plymouth
15:00 GMT	Nelson 15'; Tanner 75'	Report	Hartley 12' (o.g.); Roofe 35'	Stadium: Home Park; Attendance: 10,091; Referee: James Adcock

12 March 2016 36	Oxford United	0–1	Leyton Orient	Oxford
15:00 GMT		Report	McAnuff 74'; Baudry (red card) 90+3'	Stadium: Kassam Stadium; Attendance: 7,102; Referee: David Coote

15 March 2016 37	Oxford United	4–0	Dagenham & Redbridge	Oxford
19:45 GMT	Roofe 15', 50', 85'; MacDonald 79'	Report		Stadium: Kassam Stadium; Attendance: 5,319; Referee: Tim Robinson

19 March 2016 38	Barnet	0–3	Oxford United	Edgware
15:00 GMT		Report	O'Dowda 49', 61'; Hylton 85'	Stadium: The Hive Stadium; Attendance: 3,264; Referee: Scott Duncan

25 March 2016 39	Oxford United	1–1	Stevenage	Oxford
15:00 GMT	Sercombe 58'; Lundstram (red card) 16'	Report	Harrison 69'	Stadium: Kassam Stadium; Attendance: 7,980; Referee: Brendan Malone

28 March 2016 40	Cambridge United	0–0	Oxford United	Cambridge
15:00 BST		Report		Stadium: Abbey Stadium; Attendance: 6,108; Referee: Mark Haywood

9 April 2016 41	Crawley Town	1–5	Oxford United	Crawley
15:00 BST	McNerney 28'	Report	Maguire 39', 72' (pen.); O'Dowda 47'; Sercombe 54'; Waring 86'	Stadium: Broadfield Stadium; Attendance: 3,340; Referee: Nick Kinseley

16 April 2016 42	Oxford United	2–3	Luton Town	Oxford
15:00 BST	Hylton 2'; Dunkley 51'	Report	Pigott 44', 58'; Lee 45+3'	Stadium: Kassam Stadium; Attendance: 8,838; Referee: Trevor Kettle

19 April 2016 43	Newport County	1–1	Oxford United	Newport
19:45 BST	Elito 14'	Report	Bowery 13'	Stadium: Rodney Parade; Attendance: 2,847; Referee: Gavin Ward

23 April 2016 44	Oxford United	2–0	Hartlepool United	Oxford
15:00 BST	Roofe 7'; Sercombe 90+3'	Report		Stadium: Kassam Stadium; Attendance: 7,955; Referee: Chris Kavanagh

30 April 2016 45	Carlisle United	0–2	Oxford United	Carlisle
15:00 BST		Report	Maguire 4' (pen.); Sercombe 74'	Stadium: Brunton Park; Attendance: 6,948; Referee: Phil Gibbs

7 May 2016 46	Oxford United	3–0	Wycombe Wanderers	Oxford
15:00 BST	Dunkley 54'; Maguire 72' (pen.); O'Dowda 90+1'	Report		Stadium: Kassam Stadium; Attendance: 11,815; Referee: Keith Stroud

==== Results summary ====
Overall								Home						Away					
Pld	W	D	L	GF	GA	GD	Pts	W	D	L	GF	GA	GD	W	D	L	GF	GA	GD
46	24	14	8	84	41	+43	86	10	7	6	37	20	+17	14	7	2	47	21	+26

Last updated: 7 May 2016.
Source: BBC Sport

==== Results by round ====
Round	1	2	3	4	5	6	7	8	9	10	11	12	13	14	15	16	17	18	19	20	21	22	23	24	25	26	27	28	29	30	31	32	33	34	35	36	37	38	39	40	41	42	43	44	45	46
Ground	H	A	H	A	H	A	A	H	H	A	A	H	A	H	H	A	H	A	H	A	H	A	H	A	A	H	A	H	A	H	H	A	A	H	A	H	H	A	H	A	A	H	A	H	A	H
Result	D	D	W	D	W	W	L	D	D	W	W	W	D	W	L	W	W	W	D	W	D	L	W	D	W	L	W	D	W	L	L	W	W	W	D	L	W	W	D	D	W	L	D	W	W	W
Position	15	16	10	9	5	4	8	5	6	6	5	3	3	3	3	2	2	2	2	1	2	3	2	3	3	3	3	3	3	3	3	3	3	2	2	2	2	2	2	2	2	2	3	3	3	2

Updated to match(es) played on 7 May 2016. Source: see below
A = Away; H = Home; W = Win; D = Draw; L = Loss

=== FA Cup ===
The draw for the first round was made live on BBC Two on Monday 26 October 2015, with Oxford drawn away to Braintree Town.

8 November 2015 1	Braintree Town	1–1	Oxford United	Braintree
14:00 GMT	Davis 63'	Report	Taylor 15'	Stadium: Cressing Road; Attendance: 1,248; Referee: Phil Gibbs

17 November 2015 1R	Oxford United	3–1	Braintree Town	Oxford
19:45 GMT	Sercombe 42'; Hoban 64', 80' (pen.)	Report	Davis 33' (pen.)	Stadium: Kassam Stadium; Attendance: 3,265; Referee: Darren England

6 December 2015 2	Oxford United	1–0	Forest Green Rovers	Oxford
14:00 GMT	Roofe 76'	Report		Stadium: Kassam Stadium; Attendance: 4,618; Referee: Robert Lewis

10 January 2016 3	Oxford United	3–2	Swansea City	Oxford
12:00 GMT	Sercombe 45' (pen.); Roofe 49', 59'	Report	Montero 23'; Gomis 66'	Stadium: Kassam Stadium; Attendance: 11,673; Referee: Kevin Friend

30 January 2016 4	Oxford United	0–3	Blackburn Rovers	Oxford
15:00 GMT		Report	Marshall 36' (pen.), 76'; Watt 45+2'	Stadium: Kassam Stadium; Attendance: 11,647; Referee: Andy Davies

=== League Cup ===
On 16 June 2015, the first round draw was made, Oxford United were drawn away against Brentford. In the second round, Oxford United drew another Championship side away from home, Sheffield Wednesday.

11 August 2015 1	Brentford	0–4	Oxford United	Brentford
19:45 BST		Report	Sercombe 5'; Hylton 9'; Roofe 12'; Mullins 54'	Stadium: Griffin Park; Attendance: 5,177; Referee: Dean Whitestone

25 August 2015 2	Sheffield Wednesday	1–0	Oxford United	Owlerton
19:45 BST	Nuhiu 55'	Report		Stadium: Hillsborough; Attendance: 11,799; Referee: David Webb

=== Football League Trophy ===
On 5 September 2015, the second round draw was shown live on Soccer AM and drawn by Charlie Austin and Ed Skrein. Oxford were drawn at home to Swindon Town. Having beaten their local rivals 2–0, Oxford were drawn away to fellow League Two side Dagenham & Redbridge in the Area Quarter-Final, a match that also ended in a 2–0 victory. Oxford beat Yeovil Town of League Two 3–2 in the Area Semi-final to meet Millwall of League One in the two-legged Area Final. Oxford won the first leg at The Den, leading scorer Kemar Roofe netting both the goals and, despite losing the second leg at the Kassam Stadium, reached the Wembley final 2–1 on aggregate.

In the final against Barnsley, United led 1–0 at half-time through a goal from Callum O'Dowda. An own-goal by Chey Dunkley early in the second half was followed by goals from Ashley Fletcher and Adam Hammill to give Barnsley a two-goal cushion. A header from Danny Hylton in the 76th minute reduced the deficit, but United were unable to find an equaliser in the remaining minutes and suffered defeat at Wembley for the first time in their history.

1	Bye

6 October 2015 2	Oxford United	2–0	Swindon Town	Oxford
19:45 BST	Roofe 41', 53'	Report		Stadium: Kassam Stadium; Attendance: 9,013; Referee: Gavin Ward

11 November 2015 Area QF	Dagenham & Redbridge	0–2	Oxford United	Dagenham
19:45 GMT		Report	Hoban 1'; MacDonald 47'	Stadium: Victoria Road; Attendance: 1,011; Referee: Andy Davies

8 December 2015 Area SF	Oxford United	3–2	Yeovil Town	Oxford
19:45 GMT	Evans 5'; O'Dowda 43'; Maguire 54'	Report	Fogden 37'; Jeffers 90'	Stadium: Kassam Stadium; Attendance: 2,532; Referee: Keith Stroud

14 January 2016 Area Final 1L	Millwall	0–2	Oxford United	Bermondsey
19:45 GMT		Report	Roofe 15', 43'	Stadium: The Den; Attendance: 7,275; Referee: Stuart Attwell

2 February 2016 Area Final 2L	Oxford United	0–1 (2–1 agg.)	Millwall	Oxford
19:45 GMT		Report	Gregory 54'	Stadium: Kassam Stadium; Attendance: 10,138; Referee: Scott Duncan

3 April 2016 Final	Barnsley	3–2	Oxford United	Wembley
14:30 GMT	Dunkley 52' (o.g.); Fletcher 68'; Hammill 74'	Report	O'Dowda 29'; Hylton 76'	Stadium: Wembley Stadium; Attendance: 59,230; Referee: Andy Woolmer

== Squad statistics ==
=== Appearances and goals ===
As of 7 May 2016

No.	Pos	Nat	Player	Total		League Two		FA Cup		League Cup		FL Trophy	
No.	Pos	Nat	Player	Apps	Goals	Apps	Goals	Apps	Goals	Apps	Goals	Apps	Goals
1	GK	(England) ENG	Sam Slocombe	28	0	23	0	2	0	2	0	1	0
2	DF	(England) ENG	George Baldock	35	2	27	2	5	0	1	0	2	0
3	DF	(England) ENG	Joe Skarz	51	0	41	0	5	0	2	0	3	0
4	MF	(England) ENG	Kemar Roofe	49	26	39+1	18	4	3	1	1	4	4
5	DF	(England) ENG	Johnny Mullins	51	1	39+1	0	5	0	2	1	4	0
6	DF	(England) ENG	Jake Wright	36	0	29	0	2	0	1	0	4	0
7	MF	(England) ENG	Danny Rose	19	0	11+2	0	2+1	0	1+1	0	1	0
7	FW	(England) ENG	George Waring	15	1	3+11	1	0	0	0	0	0+1	0
8	MF	(England) ENG	Liam Sercombe	58	17	45	14	4+1	2	1+1	1	5+1	0
9	FW	(Ireland) EIR	Patrick Hoban	33	5	2+21	2	3+1	2	1+1	0	2+2	1
10	FW	(England) ENG	Danny Hylton	52	14	34+7	12	1+3	0	1+1	1	4+1	1
11	MF	(Scotland) SCO	Alex MacDonald	52	6	35+5	5	4	0	2	0	5+1	1
13	GK	(Liechtenstein) LIE	Benjamin Büchel	31	0	23	0	3	0	0	0	5	0
14	MF	(England) ENG	Josh Ruffels	22	0	8+8	0	0+1	0	1+1	0	2+1	0
15	FW	(Republic of Ireland) IRL	Callum O'Dowda	50	10	18+20	8	4+1	0	1+1	0	4+1	2
16	MF	(England) ENG	Jordan Graham	7	0	4+2	0	0	0	0	0	1	0
16	DF	(England) ENG	Jonjoe Kenny	19	0	16	0	0+1	0	0	0	2	0
18	MF	(England) ENG	John Lundstram	47	3	33+4	3	4+1	0	1	0	4	0
19	MF	(England) ENG	Zeli Ismail	6	0	0+5	0	0	0	0	0	0+1	0
20	FW	(England) ENG	Ryan Taylor	26	4	15+6	3	2	1	2	0	1	0
21	GK	(New Zealand) NZL	Max Crocombe	0	0	0	0	0	0	0	0	0	0
22	MF	(England) ENG	Sam Long	3	0	0+1	0	0	0	1	0	1	0
23	DF	(England) ENG	Cameron Gayle	2	0	0	0	1	0	0	0	1	0
24	MF	(England) ENG	Josh Ashby	4	0	0+3	0	0	0	0	0	0+1	0
25	DF	(England) ENG	Freddie Grant	0	0	0	0	0	0	0	0	0	0
26	DF	(England) ENG	Robbie Cundy	1	0	0	0	0	0	0	0	1	0
27	MF	(Antigua and Barbuda) ANT	AJ George	4	0	0+2	0	0+1	0	0	0	1	0
28	FW	(Scotland) SCO	Chris Maguire	25	5	21	4	1	0	0	0	2+1	1
29	FW	(England) ENG	Jordan Bowery	20	7	9+8	7	1	0	0	0	0+2	0
30	MF	(England) ENG	Sam Humphreys	1	0	0	0	0	0	0	0	0+1	0
31	FW	(England) ENG	James Roberts	4	0	1+3	0	0	0	0	0	0	0
32	MF	(England) ENG	Aidan Hawtin	0	0	0	0	0	0	0	0	0	0
33	DF	(England) ENG	Chey Dunkley	35	4	26+3	4	2	0	1	0	3	0
36	DF	(Wales) WAL	Jordan Evans	14	1	4+5	0	0+2	0	0	0	3	1

=== Top scorers ===
As of 7 May 2016

Place	Position	Nation	Number	Name	League Two	FA Cup	League Cup	FL Trophy	Total
1	MF	(England)	4	Kemar Roofe	18	3	1	4	26
2	MF	(England)	8	Liam Sercombe	14	2	1	0	17
3	FW	(England)	10	Danny Hylton	12	0	1	1	14
4	FW	(England)	15	Callum O'Dowda	8	0	0	2	10
5	FW	(England)	29	Jordan Bowery	7	0	0	0	7
6	MF	(Scotland)	11	Alex MacDonald	5	0	0	1	6
7	FW	(Republic of Ireland)	9	Patrick Hoban	2	2	0	1	5
7	FW	(Scotland)	28	Chris Maguire	4	0	0	1	5
9	FW	(England)	20	Ryan Taylor	3	1	0	0	4
9	DF	(England)	33	Chey Dunkley	4	0	0	0	4
11	MF	(England)	18	John Lundstram	3	0	0	0	3
12	DF	(England)	2	George Baldock	2	0	0	0	2
13	DF	(England)	5	Johnny Mullins	0	0	1	0	1
13	FW	(England)	7	George Waring	1	0	0	0	1
13	DF	(Wales)	36	Jordan Evans	0	0	0	1	1
TOTALS					79	8	4	9	100

=== Disciplinary record ===
As of 7 May 2016

Number	Nation	Position	Name	League Two		FA Cup		League Cup		FL Trophy		Total	
Number	Nation	Position	Name	Yellow card	Red card	Yellow card	Red card	Yellow card	Red card	Yellow card	Red card	Yellow card	Red card
1	(England)	GK	Sam Slocombe	3	0	0	0	0	0	0	0	3	0
2	(England)	DF	George Baldock	4	0	1	0	0	0	0	0	5	0
3	(England)	DF	Joe Skarz	5	0	0	0	0	0	0	0	5	0
4	(England)	MF	Kemar Roofe	1	0	0	0	0	0	0	0	1	0
5	(England)	MF	Johnny Mullins	4	0	1	1	0	0	0	0	5	1
6	(England)	DF	Jake Wright	3	0	0	0	0	0	0	0	3	0
7	(England)	MF	Danny Rose	0	0	1	0	0	0	1	0	2	0
8	(England)	MF	Liam Sercombe	2	1	0	0	1	0	0	0	3	1
10	(England)	FW	Danny Hylton	9	0	1	0	0	0	1	0	11	0
11	(Scotland)	MF	Alex MacDonald	6	0	0	0	1	0	0	0	7	0
14	(England)	MF	Josh Ruffels	1	0	0	0	0	0	0	0	1	0
15	(England)	FW	Callum O'Dowda	1	0	0	0	0	0	1	0	2	0
16	(England)	MF	Jordan Graham	1	1	0	0	0	0	0	0	1	1
16	(England)	DF	Jonjoe Kenny	2	0	1	0	0	0	0	0	3	0
18	(England)	MF	John Lundstram	3	1	0	0	0	0	0	0	3	1
20	(England)	FW	Ryan Taylor	5	0	1	0	0	0	0	0	6	0
28	(Scotland)	FW	Chris Maguire	4	0	0	0	0	0	2	0	6	0
31	(England)	FW	James Roberts	1	0	0	0	0	0	0	0	1	0
33	(England)	DF	Chey Dunkley	5	0	0	0	1	0	0	0	6	0
TOTALS				59	3	6	1	3	0	5	0	73	4
