= Johnny Mullins =

English footballer (born 1985)

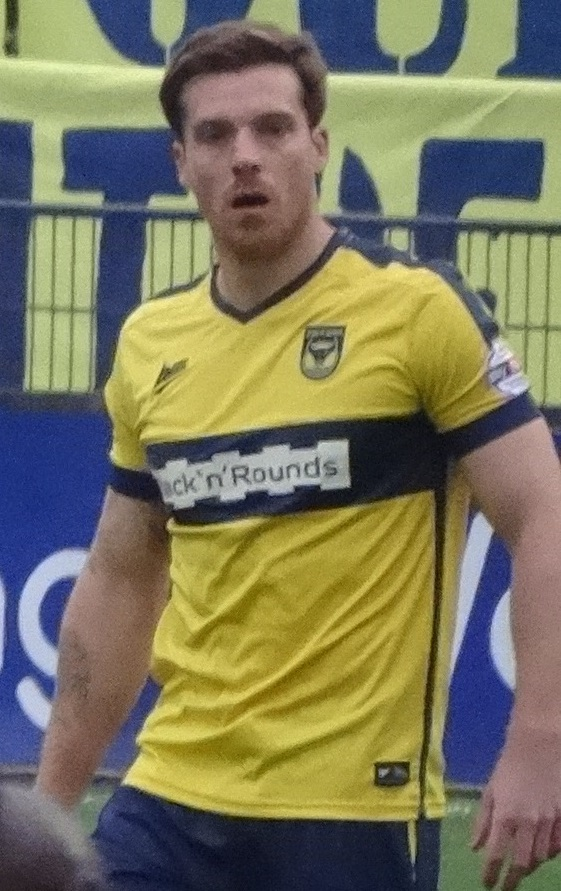
- Mullins playing for Oxford United in 2014

Personal information
- Full name: John Christopher Mullins
- Date of birth: 6 November 1985 (age 40)
- Place of birth: Hampstead, England
- Height: 5 ft 11 in (1.80 m)
- Position: Defender

Youth career
- –2004: Reading

Senior career*
Years	Team	Apps	(Gls)
2004–2006	Reading	0	(0)
2004–2005	→ Kidderminster Harriers (loan)	21	(2)
2005–2006	→ Kidderminster Harriers (loan)	25	(3)
2006–2008	Mansfield Town	86	(4)
2008–2010	Stockport County	69	(4)
2010–2013	Rotherham United	99	(7)
2012	→ Oxford United (loan)	8	(2)
2013–2016	Oxford United	119	(5)
2016–2018	Luton Town	40	(2)
2018–2019	Cheltenham Town	19	(2)
Total		486	(28)
- * Club domestic league appearances and goals

John Christopher Mullins (born 6 November 1985) is an English former professional footballer who primarily played as a centre-back.

Mullins started his career with Reading, but it was during two separate loan spells with Kidderminster Harriers that he first came to prominence, prompting Mansfield Town to sign him on his release from the Reading in 2006. He was with Mansfield for two seasons before moving to Stockport County. In 2010, he joined Rotherham United, and following his loan at Oxford United he was made Rotherham's captain as they finished runners-up in League Two. In July 2013, he joined Oxford United permanently, staying for three seasons before his transfer to Luton Town.

== Club career ==
=== Reading ===
Born in Hampstead, Greater London, Mullins signed his first professional contract with Reading on 16 December 2004 until the end of 2005–06, having progressed through the club's youth system. He later became captain of the reserve team and made seven appearances. Mullins was released by Reading upon the expiry of his contract.

==== Kidderminster Harriers (loan) ====
Mullins joined League Two club Kidderminster Harriers on loan for the remainder of 2004–05 on 17 December 2004, making his debut one day later in a 2–0 defeat away to Cheltenham Town. He scored his first goal for the club on 29 January 2005 in a 3–1 win away to Cambridge United. Mullins also scored the only goal of the reverse fixture against Cheltenham Town on 5 March. His season was ended by a hamstring injury in a 1–1 draw with Yeovil Town on 16 April, having made 21 appearances for the club.

Mullins re-signed for Kidderminster Harriers, newly relegated to the Conference National on 25 October 2005 on an initial one-month loan. His loan was later extended until late January, and once more until the end of 2005–06 on 10 January 2006. He made 30 appearances in all competitions, scoring two goals, and was named Player of the Season by the club's supporters.

=== Mansfield Town ===
Mullins signed a two-year contract with League Two club Mansfield Town on 31 May 2006. He immediately established himself in the first-team and made 48 appearances in 2006–07, scoring two goals. In 2007–08, Mullins was described by manager Billy Dearden as the most improved player in League Two, and won Mansfield's Player of the Season award. Mansfield were relegated to the Conference Premier at the end of the season, prompting Mullins to turn down the offer of a new contract, as he wanted to stay in the Football League.

=== Stockport County ===
Mullins signed a two-year contract with League One club Stockport County on 16 June 2008, with Stockport paying Mansfield compensation. He made his debut for the club in a 1–1 draw away to Huddersfield Town on the opening day of 2008–09. Mullins scored his first goals for the club in a 4–2 win away to Yeovil Town on 13 December. He captained the team when club captain Michael Raynes was sidelined due to a hamstring injury. Mullins went on to make 39 appearances in all competitions, scoring three goals. In 2009–10, Mullins took over as club captain, following the departure of Michael Raynes to Scunthorpe United. During the season, Mullins made 41 appearances in all competitions, scoring once.

=== Rotherham United ===
Mullins signed for League Two club Rotherham United on a free transfer on 6 July 2010, following the expiration of his Stockport contract. He made his debut for the club on 31 August in a 1–0 win at home to Lincoln City in the Football League Trophy. Mullins made 39 appearances in all competitions in 2010–11, scoring once in a 4–2 win away to Burton Albion on 26 February 2011. He followed up with a further 37 appearances in all competitions in 2011–12, scoring twice. Mullins was made captain of the club in 2012–13, after Ian Sharps joined Burton Albion on loan. He was part of the squad that was promoted to League One as League Two runners-up after a 2–0 win at home to Aldershot Town on 27 April 2013, in which Mullins scored the opening goal.

=== Oxford United ===
On 5 October 2012, Mullins joined League Two club Oxford United on a three-month emergency loan. He made his debut a day later in a 0–0 draw at home to Gillingham. Mullins was recalled by parent club Rotherham on 21 November, after they exercised the 24-hour recall option as part of his loan deal, having made eight appearances, scoring twice.

On 22 July 2013, Mullins signed for Oxford permanently on a three-year contract for an undisclosed fee. He scored an 82nd-minute winner in a 2–1 win at home to Bury on 10 August, and went on to score a 96th-minute equaliser at home to Wycombe Wanderers two weeks later, followed by a 57th-minute equaliser away to Cheltenham Town on 14 September. After his original loan spell, Mullins had already become a fans' favourite, but nine games into 2013–14, he had been given the nickname "Magnet Man" by the players and fans, a nod towards his ability in the opposition box. He was a member of the squad that achieved promotion to League One at the end of 2015–16, having also captained the club at Wembley Stadium in the 2016 Football League Trophy final against Barnsley. On 23 May 2016, Oxford announced Mullins would be released upon the expiry of his contract, having made 149 appearances for the club, scoring nine times.

=== Luton Town ===
Mullins signed a two-year contract with League Two club Luton Town on 31 May 2016. He debuted on the opening day of 2016–17 in a 3–0 win away to Plymouth Argyle.

He was released by Luton at the end of the 2017–18 season.

=== Cheltenham Town ===
Following his release by Luton, Mullins signed for League Two club Cheltenham Town on a two-year contract. He left Cheltenham by mutual consent at the end of the 2018–19 season with a year remaining on his contract, having made the decision to retire from professional football.

== Personal life ==
In the summer of 2008, Mullins graduated from Staffordshire University with a degree in Professional Sports Writing and Broadcasting. His sister, Geena Mullins, is a glamour model who has appeared in magazines including lads' magazine Zoo Weekly.

== Career statistics ==
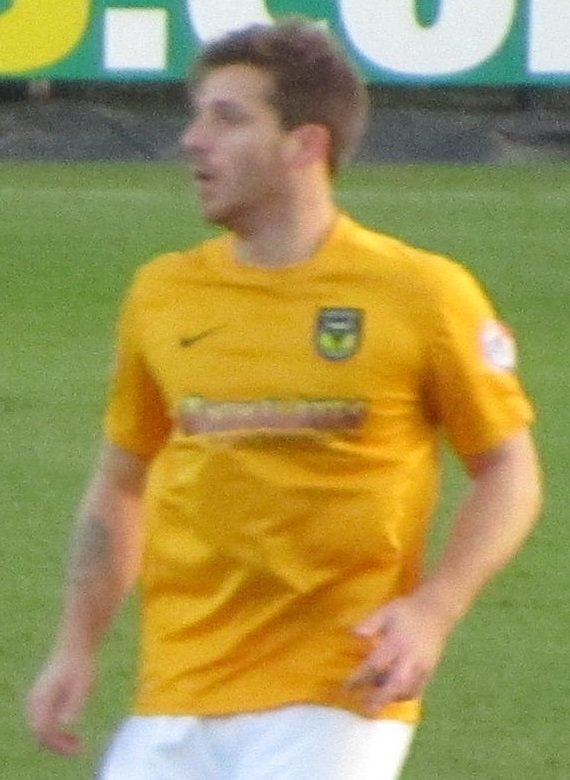
Mullins playing for Oxford United in 2013

Appearances and goals by club, season and competition
Club	Season	League			FA Cup		League Cup		Other		Total	
Club	Season	Division	Apps	Goals	Apps	Goals	Apps	Goals	Apps	Goals	Apps	Goals
Reading	2004–05	Championship	0	0	0	0	0	0	—		0	0
Reading	2005–06	Championship	0	0	0	0	0	0	—		0	0
Reading	Total		0	0	0	0	0	0	—		0	0
Kidderminster Harriers (loan)	2004–05	League Two	21	2	—		—		—		21	2
Kidderminster Harriers (loan)	2005–06	Conference National	25	2	—		—		5 (Note: Three appearances in Football League Trophy, two in FA Trophy)	0	30	2
Kidderminster Harriers (loan)	Total		46	4	—		—		5	0	51	4
Mansfield Town	2006–07	League Two	43	2	2	0	2	0	1 (Note: Appearance(s) in Football League Trophy)	0	48	2
Mansfield Town	2007–08	League Two	43	2	4	0	1	1	1	0	49	3
Mansfield Town	Total		86	4	6	0	3	1	2	0	97	5
Stockport County	2008–09	League One	33	3	4	0	1	0	1	0	39	3
Stockport County	2009–10	League One	36	1	2	0	1	0	2	0	41	1
Stockport County	Total		69	4	6	0	2	0	3	0	80	4
Rotherham United	2010–11	League Two	35	1	2	0	0	0	2	0	39	1
Rotherham United	2011–12	League Two	35	2	1	0	0	0	1	0	37	2
Rotherham United	2012–13	League Two	29	4	3	0	1	0	1	0	34	4
Rotherham United	Total		99	7	6	0	1	0	4	0	110	7
Oxford United (loan)	2012–13	League Two	8	2	—		—		—		8	2
Oxford United	2013–14	League Two	35	3	4	1	1	0	1	0	41	4
Oxford United	2014–15	League Two	44	2	3	0	2	0	0	0	49	2
Oxford United	2015–16	League Two	40	0	5	0	2	1	4	0	51	1
Oxford United	Total		127	7	12	1	5	1	5	0	149	9
Luton Town	2016–17	League Two	23	0	2	1	2	0	2 (Note: Appearances in EFL Trophy)	0	29	1
Luton Town	2017–18	League Two	17	2	2	0	1	0	2	0	22	2
Luton Town	Total		40	2	4	1	3	0	4	0	51	3
Cheltenham Town	2018–19	League Two	19	0	1	0	2	0	2	0	24	0
Career total			486	28	35	2	16	2	25	0	562	32

== Honours ==
Rotherham United

- Football League Two runner-up: 2012–13

Oxford United

- Football League Trophy runner-up: 2015–16
- Football League Two runner-up: 2015–16

Luton Town

- EFL League Two runner-up: 2017–18

Individual

- Kidderminster Harriers Player of the Season: 2005–06
- Mansfield Town Player of the Season: 2007–08
