= Chey Dunkley =

English footballer

Personal information
- Full name: Cheyenne Armani Keanu Roma Dunkley
- Date of birth: 13 February 1992 (age 34)
- Place of birth: Wolverhampton, England
- Height: 6 ft 2 in (1.88 m)
- Position: Centre back

Team information
- Current team: Solihull Moors (on loan from Chesterfield)

Youth career
- 2006–2010: Crewe Alexandra

Senior career*
Years	Team	Apps	(Gls)
2010	Crewe Alexandra	0	(0)
2010	→ Hednesford Town (loan)	18	(0)
2010–2012	Hednesford Town	68	(4)
2012–2015	Kidderminster Harriers	90	(11)
2014	→ Oxford United (loan)	3	(0)
2015–2017	Oxford United	78	(7)
2017–2020	Wigan Athletic	107	(13)
2020–2022	Sheffield Wednesday	33	(2)
2022–2024	Shrewsbury Town	91	(9)
2024–	Chesterfield	37	(2)
2026–	→ Solihull Moors (loan)	0	(0)

International career
2014	England C	2	(0)
- * Club domestic league appearances and goals as of 12:26, 30 September 2026 (UTC)

Cheyenne Armani Keanu Roma "Chey" Dunkley (born 13 February 1992) is an English professional footballer who plays as a defender for Solihull Moors on loan from EFL League Two side Chesterfield.

== Club career ==
=== Early career ===
Born in Wolverhampton, Dunkley joined Crewe Alexandra's youth setup in 2006, aged 14. He made his senior debut while on a work experience loan at Hednesford Town in 2010.

In the 2010 summer, Dunkley was released by Crewe, and joined Hednesford permanently. After two years acting as a starter, he moved to Conference Premier side Kidderminster Harriers in June 2012, with the latter having to pay a £5,000 plus add-ons fee after a dispute in the tribunal was held.

=== Oxford United ===
On 20 November 2014 Dunkley joined Oxford United on loan until the end of the season, with Sam Long moving in the opposite direction, and joined The Us permanently in January for an undisclosed fee. He made his professional debut on 20 December 2014, coming on as a 31st-minute substitute in a 1–1 away draw against Hartlepool United. He scored his first goal in a 4–1 away victory in League Two over Exeter City on 23 February 2016. In April 2016 the "unfortunate" Dunkley scored an own goal in the final of the Football League Trophy against Barnsley at Wembley Stadium, a match which Barnsley won 3–2. On 7 May 2016, Dunkley scored the first goal in the final game of the 2015–16 season against Wycombe Wanderers, a game which United won 3–0 to secure promotion to League One.

=== Wigan Athletic ===
On 5 June 2017 it was announced that Dunkley would join Wigan Athletic at the end of his Oxford United contract.

=== Sheffield Wednesday ===
On 13 August 2020 it was announced that Dunkley would join Sheffield Wednesday as their second signing of the summer on a two-year deal. He would eventually make his debut almost 4 months after joining the club in a 2–1 defeat against Barnsley on 12 December 2020. He was awarded the clubs player for the month for December, the first month after breaking into the team. His first goal for the club was an equaliser against Cheltenham Town on 30 October 2021. The following month would see a great turn of form, scoring again, against Accrington Stanley and being a constant threat in both boxes, as well as winning the clubs player of the month for November. On 21 May 2022, it was announced he would be released following the end of the season.

=== Shrewsbury Town ===
On 28 June 2022, Dunkley agreed to join Shrewsbury Town on a two-year deal.

=== Chesterfield ===
On 6 June 2024, Dunkley agreed to join newly promoted League Two club Chesterfield on a three-year deal.

On 29 September 2026, Dunkley joined National League club Solihull Moors on loan until 26 December.

== International career ==
In June 2021, Dunkley received an invite to play for the Jamaica national side for the CONCACAF Gold Cup in July 2021.

== Career statistics ==
As of end of 2025–26 season

Appearances and goals by club, season and competition
Club	Season	League			FA Cup		League Cup		Other		Total	
Club	Season	Division	Apps	Goals	Apps	Goals	Apps	Goals	Apps	Goals	Apps	Goals
Kidderminster Harriers	2012–13	Conference Premier	43	5	2	1	0	0	2	1	49	8
Kidderminster Harriers	2013–14	Conference Premier	28	2	2	0	0	0	1	0	31	2
Kidderminster Harriers	2014–15	Conference Premier	19	4	1	0	0	0	0	0	20	4
Kidderminster Harriers	Total		90	11	5	1	0	0	3	1	100	14
Oxford United	2014–15	League Two	9	0	0	0	0	0	0	0	9	0
Oxford United	2015–16	League Two	29	4	2	0	1	0	3	0	35	4
Oxford United	2016–17	League One	40	3	6	0	1	0	5	0	52	3
Oxford United	Total		78	7	8	0	2	0	8	0	97	7
Wigan Athletic	2017–18	League One	43	7	7	0	0	0	0	0	50	7
Wigan Athletic	2018–19	Championship	37	1	1	0	0	0	0	0	37	0
Wigan Athletic	2019–20	Championship	26	6	1	0	1	0	0	0	28	6
Wigan Athletic	Total		107	13	9	0	1	0	0	0	115	13
Sheffield Wednesday	2020–21	Championship	12	0	0	0	0	0	0	0	12	0
Sheffield Wednesday	2021–22	League One	21	2	2	0	0	0	1 (Note: Appearance(s) in EFL Trophy)	0	24	2
Sheffield Wednesday	Total		33	2	2	0	0	0	1	0	36	2
Shrewsbury Town	2022–23	League One	46	5	3	0	2	1	0	0	51	6
Shrewsbury Town	2023–24	League One	45	4	2	0	0	0	2	0	49	4
Shrewsbury Town	Total		91	9	5	0	2	1	2	0	100	10
Chesterfield	2024–25	League Two	9	1	0	0	1	0	1	0	11	1
Chesterfield	2025–26	League Two	28	1	2	0	1	0	1	0	32	1
Chesterfield	Total		37	2	2	0	2	0	2	0	43	2
Career total			437	45	31	1	7	1	16	1	491	48

== Honours ==
Oxford United

- Football League Two runner-up: 2015–16
- Football League Trophy/EFL Trophy runner-up: 2015–16, 2016–17

Wigan Athletic

- EFL League One: 2017–18
