= 2012–13 Oxford United F.C. season =

English football club season

Oxford United
2012–13 season
- Chairman: Ian Lenagan
- Manager: Chris Wilder
- Stadium: Kassam Stadium
- Football League Two: 9th
- FA Cup: 3rd Round
- League Cup: 2nd Round
- Football League Trophy: 4th Round (Area Semi-final)
- Top goalscorer: League: Tom Craddock (10); Alfie Potter (10); All: James Constable (14)
- Highest home attendance: 7,746 (v Swindon Town 5 September 2012 (Football League Trophy))
- Lowest home attendance: 2,882 (v Southend United 8 January 2013 (Football League Trophy))

Oxford United F.C. season 2012–13 was the club's third season in League Two after returning from the Conference. Oxford United had finished 9th in League Two in 2011–12 and failed to improve on this position in 2012–13. The club's opening nine league fixtures, consisting of three wins followed by six defeats, set the tone of a campaign in which the club were never serious contenders for a playoff place and which alternated between winning and losing streaks; a case in point was the three-game run of victories at the end of the season after the possibility of promotion had disappeared, which put a somewhat flattering gloss on Oxford's final position. They were knocked out by higher-division opposition in the early rounds of both the FA Cup and League Cup (including elimination at the hands of Sheffield United from the former competition for the second year in succession), but reached the Area Semi-final of the Football League Trophy and won the Oxfordshire Senior Cup.

It was the club's first season under the chairmanship of owner Ian Lenagan, who had taken over from Kelvin Thomas in the previous close season. James Constable finished the season as overall top scorer for the fifth consecutive season with 14 goals (9 in the league), while Alfie Potter and Tom Craddock jointly topped the list of League scorers, with 10 League goals apiece. During the season, veteran defender Michael Duberry overtook the club record for the oldest first-team outfield player, his final appearance coming in the last game of the season against Accrington Stanley at the age of 37 years and 195 days.

It was the club's 119th year in existence, their 113th of competitive football and their 64th since turning professional. This article covers the period from 1 July 2012 to 30 June 2013.

== Team kit ==
The previous season was the last in a three-year deal with Nike Inour kit. The club's main sponsor for the 2012–13 season was Bridle Insurance, an Oxfordshire-based insurance company.

Home colours	Away colours	Home goalkeeper

== Match fixtures and results ==
=== Pre-season friendlies ===
17 July 2012	Oxford United	1–0	West Ham United	Kassam Stadium
19:45	Smalley 36'	Report		Attendance: 4,708

20 July 2012	Didcot Town	1–1	Oxford United	NPower Loop Meadow Stadium
19:45	Vincente 84'	Report	Smalley 77'	Attendance: 593

24 July 2012	Seacoast United Mariners	1–2	Oxford United	Thornton Academy, Saco, ME
	Nick George 87'	Report	Smalley 40' (pen.); Rigg 83'	Attendance: 624

27 July 2012	Seacoast United Phantoms	1–1	Oxford United	Portsmouth High School, Portsmouth, NH
19:00	Luke George 77'	Report	Capaldi 15'	Attendance: 700

30 July 2012	Jim Dedeus XI	1–4	Oxford United	Portsmouth High School, Portsmouth, NH
	Jones 31'	Report	Craddock 30'; Pittman 44'; Constable 74'; Potter 79'	Attendance: 200

4 August 2012	Oxford United	1–2	Cardiff City	Kassam Stadium
15:00	Whittingham 16'; Kiss 65'	Report	Potter 74'	Attendance: 1,809; Referee: Andrew Woolmer (Northamptonshire)

7 August 2012	Eastleigh	2–0	Oxford United	Silverlake Stadium, Eastleigh
19:45	McAllister; Reason	Report		Attendance: 290

10 August 2012	Oxford City	0–2	Oxford United	Court Place Farm, Marston
		Report	Craddock 37' 77' (pen.)	Attendance: 590; Referee: Andy Woolmer

=== League Two ===
For more information on this season's Football League Two, see 2012–13 Football League Two. Oxford United's home games are played at the Kassam Stadium.

==== League table ====
Pos	Team	Pld	W	D	L	GF	GA	GD	Pts	Promotion, qualification or relegation
7	Bradford City (O, P)	46	18	15	13	63	52	+11	69	Qualification for League Two play-offs (Note: Four teams play for one spot and promotion to Football League One.)
8	Chesterfield	46	18	13	15	60	45	+15	67	
9	Oxford United	46	19	8	19	59	60	−1	65	
10	Exeter City	46	18	10	18	63	62	+1	64	
11	Southend United	46	16	13	17	61	55	+6	61	

Updated to match(es) played on 27 April 2013. Source: BBC Sport
Rules for classification: 1) Points; 2) Goal difference; 3) Number of goals scored
(O) Play-off winners; (P) Promoted

==== Results ====
18 August 2012 1	Bristol Rovers	0–2	Oxford United	Memorial Stadium
15:00		Report	Forster-Caskey 22'; Potter 32'	Attendance: 7,451; Referee: Mohareb

21 August 2012 2	Oxford United	2–0	Southend United	Kassam Stadium
19:45	Craddock 54' 87'	Report		Attendance: 6,001; Referee: Langford

25 August 2012 3	Oxford United	2–1	Plymouth Argyle	Kassam Stadium
15:00	Smalley 20' 23'	Report	Williams 74'	Attendance: 6,906; Referee: Bratt

1 September 2012 4	York City	3–1	Oxford United	Bootham Crescent
15:00	Coulson 1' Chambers 15' McLaughlin 54'	Report	McLaughlin 23' (o.g.)	Attendance: 4,015; Referee: Duncan

8 September 2012 5	Oxford United	2–4	Exeter City	Kassam Stadium
15:00	Forster-Caskey 55' (pen.); Potter 63'	Report	Cureton 11' 50'; Bennett 27'; O'Flynn 72'	Attendance: 6,405; Referee: Jeremy Simpson

15 September 2012 6	Burton Albion	4–0	Oxford United	Pirelli Stadium
15:00	Zola 25', 66'; Maghoma 45', 65'	Report		Attendance: 2,389; Referee: R Clark

18 September 2012 7	Cheltenham Town	2–1	Oxford United	Whaddon Road
17:45	Carter 29'; Harrad 60'	Report	Leven 80' (pen.)	Attendance: 3,037; Referee: Madley

22 September 2012 8	Oxford United	0–2	Bradford City	Kassam Stadium
15:00		Report	Davies 52'; Wells 68'	Attendance: 6,032; Referee: Andy Davies

29 September 2012 9	Rotherham United	3–1	Oxford United	New York Stadium
15:00	O'Connor 30' (pen.) 74'; Taylor 88'	Report	Rigg 8'	Attendance: 7,258; Referee: Salisbury

2 October 2012 10	Oxford United	3–2	AFC Wimbledon	Kassam Stadium
19:45	Forster-Caskey 9'; Smalley 55'; Potter 81'	Report	Harrison 20'; Fenlon 36'	Attendance: 5,206; Referee: East

6 October 2012 11	Oxford United	0–0	Gillingham	Kassam Stadium
15:00		Report		Attendance: 6,690; Referee: Williamson

15 October 2012 12	Port Vale	3–0	Oxford United	Vale Park
19:45	Pope 30'; Vincent 51'; Morsy 62'	Report		Attendance: 4,596; Referee: Keith Stroud

20 October 2012 13	Oxford United	5–0	Accrington Stanley	Kassam Stadium
15:00	Craddock 12', 23', 36', 71'; Potter 78'	Report		Attendance: 5,403; Referee: Deadman

23 October 2012 14	Rochdale	2–0	Oxford United	Spotland
19:45	Donnelly 78'; Grant 87'	Report		Attendance: 1,619; Referee: Kettle

27 October 2012 15	Wycombe Wanderers	1–3	Oxford United	Adams Park
15:00	Grant 49' (pen.)	Report	Constable 4'; Craddock 46'; Mullins 62'	Attendance: 5,498; Referee: Swarbrick

6 November 2012 16	Oxford United	2–3	Dagenham & Redbridge	Kassam Stadium
19:45	Craddock 60', 65'	Report	Williams 36'; Howell 54'; Wilkinson 62'	Attendance: 5,074; Referee: Sarginson

10 November 2012 17	Oxford United	0–0	Torquay United	Kassam Stadium
15:00		Report		Attendance: 5,773; Referee: Madley

17 November 2012 18	Chesterfield	2–1	Oxford United	Proact Stadium
15:00	Cooper 45'; Atkinson 90'	Report	Mullins 1'	Attendance: 5,433; Referee: Whitestone

20 November 2012 19	Barnet	2–2	Oxford United	Underhill Stadium
19:45	Hyde 5', 70'	Report	Rigg 6'; Whing 46'	Attendance: 1,626; Referee: Haywood

24 November 2012 20	Oxford United	2–1	Northampton Town	Kassam Stadium
15:00	Constable 15'; Pittman 79'	Report	Platt 76'	Attendance: 6,635; Referee: Mathieson

8 December 2012 21	Oxford United	1–1	Aldershot Town	Kassam Stadium
15:00	Chapman 33'	Report	Mekki 84'	Attendance: 5,721; Referee: Harrington

15 December 2012 22	Morecambe	1–1	Oxford United	Globe Arena
13:00	Ellison 78'	Report	Worley 88'	Attendance: 1,385; Referee: Duncan

26 December 2012 23	Exeter City	1–3	Oxford United	St James Park, Exeter
15:00	Cureton 67' (pen.)	Report	Constable 18', 50'; Leven 52'	Attendance: 4,437; Referee: Malone

29 December 2012 24	AFC Wimbledon	0–3	Oxford United	Kingsmeadow
15:00		Report	Rigg 32'; Potter 37'; Craddock 64'	Attendance: 4,401; Referee: Collins

1 January 2013 25	Oxford United	1–0	Cheltenham Town	Kassam Stadium
15:00	Leven 16' (pen.)	Report		Attendance: 6,951; Referee: Graham

12 January 2013 26	Bradford City	1–2	Oxford United	Valley Parade
15:00	Wells 14'	Report	Rigg 18'; Leven 90' (pen.)	Attendance: 10,087; Referee: Jeremy Simpson

26 January 2013 27	Fleetwood Town	3–0	Oxford United	Highbury Stadium
15:00	Matt 6'; Crowther 58'; Parkin 86'	Report		Attendance: 2,461; Referee: Geoff Eltrigham

29 January 2013 28	Oxford United	1–1	Burton Albion	Kassam Stadium
19:45	Constable 50'	Report	Maghoma 70'	Attendance: 4,906; Referee: Woolmer

2 February 2013 29	Southend United	1–0	Oxford United	Roots Hall
15:00	Leonard 85'	Report		Attendance: 5,596; Referee: Ward

9 February 2013 30	Oxford United	0–2	Bristol Rovers	Kassam Stadium
15:00		Report	Brown 55' (pen.); Richards 90'	Attendance: 7,608; Referee: Madley

12 February 2013 31	Oxford United	1–2	Fleetwood Town	Kassam Stadium
19:45	Davis 89'	Report	Crowther 28'; Brown 55'	Attendance: 5,003; Referee: Langford

16 February 2013 32	Plymouth Argyle	0–1	Oxford United	Home Park
15:00		Report	Constable 16'	Attendance: 7,189; Referee: Sarginson

23 February 2013 33	Oxford United	0–0	York City	Kassam Stadium
15:00		Report		Attendance: 5,808; Referee: Harrington

26 February 2013 34	Gillingham	0–1	Oxford United	Priestfield Stadium
19:45		Report	Potter 84'	Attendance: 4,928; Referee: Graham

2 March 2013 35	Oxford United	2–1	Port Vale	Kassam Stadium
15:00	Potter 10'; Smalley 76'	Report	Loft 16'	Attendance: 6,322; Referee: Ilderton

5 March 2013 36	Oxford United	0–4	Rotherham United	Kassam Stadium
19:45		Report	Noble 30'; Árnason 33'; Mullins 41'; Pringle 44'	Attendance: 5,169; Referee: D'Urso

9 March 2013 37	Torquay United	1–3	Oxford United	Plainmoor
15:00	Downes 58'	Report	Constable 50'; Batt 54' (pen.); Heslop 90'	Attendance: 2,504; Referee: Martin

12 March 2013 38	Oxford United	1–0	Barnet	Kassam Stadium
19:45	Raynes 90'	Report		Attendance: 5,027; Referee: Phil Gibbs

16 March 2013 39	Oxford United	0–1	Chesterfield	Kassam Stadium
15:00		Report	Richards 5'	Attendance: 6,003; Referee: Bond

23 March 2013 40	Northampton Town	1–0	Oxford United	Sixfields Stadium
15:00	Harding 45'	Report		Attendance: 6,151; Referee: Webb

29 March 2013 41	Oxford United	1–1	Morecambe	Kassam Stadium
15:00	Potter 60'	Report	Redshaw 90'	Attendance: 5,523; Referee: Andy Davies

1 April 2013 42	Aldershot Town	3–2	Oxford United	Recreation Ground
15:00	McCallum 13'; Reid 49' (pen.); Goulding 87'	Report	Davies 66'; Pittman 85'	Attendance: 2,927; Referee: Malone

6 April 2013 43	Oxford United	0–1	Wycombe Wanderers	Kassam Stadium
15:00		Report	Grant 19'	Attendance: 6,777; Referee: Salisbury

13 April 2013 44	Dagenham & Redbridge	0–1	Oxford United	Victoria Road
15:00		Report	Potter 40'	Attendance: 1,788; Referee: Deadman

20 April 2013 45	Oxford United	3–0	Rochdale	Kassam Stadium
15:00		Report	Whing 53'; Constable 76'; Potter 90'	Attendance: 6,014; Referee: Rushton

27 April 2013 46	Accrington Stanley	0–3	Oxford United	Crown Ground
15:00		Report	Constable 64'; Smalley 67' (pen.); Rigg 89'	Attendance: 2,028; Referee: Duncan

==== Results summary ====
Overall								Home						Away					
Pld	W	D	L	GF	GA	GD	Pts	W	D	L	GF	GA	GD	W	D	L	GF	GA	GD
46	19	8	19	60	61	−1	65	9	6	8	29	27	+2	10	2	11	31	34	−3

Last updated: 27 April 2013.
Source: BBC Sport

==== Results by round ====
Round	1	2	3	4	5	6	7	8	9	10	11	12	13	14	15	16	17	18	19	20	21	22	23	24	25	26	27	28	29	30	31	32	33	34	35	36	37	38	39	40	41	42	43	44	45	46
Ground	A	H	H	A	H	A	A	H	A	H	H	A	H	A	A	H	H	A	A	H	H	A	A	A	H	A	A	H	A	H	H	A	H	A	H	H	A	H	H	A	H	A	H	A	H	A
Result	W	W	W	L	L	L	L	L	L	W	D	L	W	L	W	L	D	L	D	W	D	D	W	W	W	W	L	D	L	L	L	W	D	W	W	L	W	W	L	L	D	L	L	W	W	W
Position	8	1	1	3	6	11	16	17	17	16	16	19	18	18	15	18	17	18	18	18	18	18	16	14	13	12	12	12	13	15	15	13	13	11	11	12	10	9	10	10	10	12	13	11	10	9

Updated to match(es) played on 27 April 2013. Source: see below
A = Away; H = Home; W = Win; D = Draw; L = Loss

=== FA Cup ===
3 November 2012 1	Barnet	0–2	Oxford United	Underhill Stadium
15:00		Report	Constable 56'; Rigg 80'	Attendance: 2,346; Referee: Robinson

1 December 2012 2	Accrington Stanley	3–3	Oxford United	The Crown Ground
15:00	Lindfield 25'; Beattie 80'; Molyneux 90'	Report	Pittman 12'; Constable 86'; Raynes 90'	Attendance: 1,195; Referee: Woolmer

18 December 2012 2 (Replay)	Oxford United	2–0	Accrington Stanley	Kassam Stadium
19:45	Constable 66'; Leven 79'	Report		Attendance: 2,566; Referee: Hooper

5 January 2013 3	Oxford United	0–3	Sheffield United	Kassam Stadium
15:00		Report	McMahon 17'; Kitson 68'; Blackman 87'	Attendance: 7,079; Referee: Boyeson

=== Football League Cup ===
14 August 2012 1	Oxford United	0–0 (a.e.t.) (5–3 p)	A.F.C. Bournemouth	Kassam Stadium
19:45		Report		Attendance: 3,788; Referee: Drysdale
	Penalties
	Craddock (penalty scored); Smalley (penalty scored); Rigg (penalty scored); Chapman (penalty scored); Batt (penalty scored)		(penalty scored) Daniels; (penalty scored) McDermott; (penalty missed) Pugh; (penalty scored) Grabban

28 August 2012 2	Leeds United	3–0	Oxford United	Elland Road
19:45	Austin 29'; Byram 34'; Lees 74'	Report		Attendance: 13,713; Referee: Sutton

=== Football League Trophy ===
5 September 2012 1	Oxford United	1–0	Swindon Town	Kassam Stadium
19:45	Potter 88'	Report		Attendance: 7,746; Referee: Mathieson

9 October 2012 2	Cheltenham Town	2–4	Oxford United	Whaddon Road
19:45	Duffy 31'; Lowe 45'	Report	Craddock 35'; Worley 67'; Constable 71'; Leven 80' (pen.)	Attendance: 1,236; Referee: Attwell

4 December 2012 3	Plymouth Argyle	1–1 (1–3 p)	Oxford United	Home Park
19:00	MacDonald 20'	Report	Constable 62'	Attendance: 2,383; Referee: East
	Penalties
	Griffiths (penalty scored); Gurrieri (penalty missed); Lowry (penalty missed); Blanchard (penalty missed)		(penalty scored) Rigg; (penalty scored) Chapman; (penalty scored) Davis

8 January 2013 4	Oxford United	3–3 (3–5 p)	Southend United	Kassam Stadium
19:45	Marsh 14'; Craddock 31'; Rigg 89'	Report	Corr 6', 59'; Clohessy 54'	Attendance: 2,882; Referee: Coote
	Penalties
	Rigg (penalty scored); Craddock (penalty scored); Davis (penalty scored); Potter (penalty missed)		(penalty scored) Tomlin; (penalty scored) Clohessy; (penalty scored) Hurst; (penalty scored) Timlin; (penalty scored) Benyon

=== Oxfordshire Senior Cup ===
6 February 2013 QF	Oxford United	1–0	Chinnor	ASM Stadium (Thame United)
19:30	Smalley 68' (pen.)	Report

28 March 2013 SF	Oxford United	3–2	Banbury United	Court Place Farm (Oxford City)
19:45	O'Dowda 16'; Pittman 54' (pen.); Roberts 62'	Report	Skendi 41'; Otoba 73'

1 May 2013 F	Oxford United	4–2 (a.e.t.)	Oxford City	Kassam Stadium
19:45	Ashby 48'; Marsh 65'; Pittman 96'; Roberts 120'	Report	Cook 24' (pen.); Barcelos 68'	Attendance: 901

== Squad statistics ==
=== Appearances and goals ===
As of 27 April 2013

No.	Pos	Nat	Player	Total		League Two		FA Cup		League Cup		JP Trophy	
No.	Pos	Nat	Player	Apps	Goals	Apps	Goals	Apps	Goals	Apps	Goals	Apps	Goals
1	GK	(England) ENG	Ryan Clarke	34	0	23+1	0	4	0	2	0	4	0
2	DF	(England) ENG	Damian Batt	45	1	37	1	2+1	0	2	0	3	0
3	DF	(England) ENG	Sean McGinty	2	0	0	0	0	0	1	0	0+1	0
4	DF	(England) ENG	Michael Raynes	46	2	36+2	1	3	1	2	0	3	0
5	DF	(England) ENG	Michael Duberry	12	0	9+1	0	1+1	0	0	0	0	0
6	DF	(England) ENG	Jake Wright	51	0	42	0	4	0	2	0	3	0
7	MF	(Northern Ireland) NIR	Adam Chapman	34	1	22+4	1	2+1	0	2	0	3	0
8	MF	(England) ENG	Simon Heslop	30	1	14+10	1	1	0	1+1	0	2+1	0
9	FW	(England) ENG	James Constable	44	14	29+8	9	3	3	2	0	1+1	2
10	FW	(England) ENG	Deane Smalley	28	5	16+10	5	0	0	0+1	0	1	0
11	FW	(England) ENG	Jon-Paul Pittman	17	3	2+11	2	2	1	0+1	0	1	0
14	MF	(England) ENG	Sean Rigg	53	7	41+3	5	3+1	1	2	0	2+1	1
15	MF	(England) ENG	Alfie Potter	52	11	39+4	10	4	0	2	0	2+1	1
16	DF	(England) ENG	Andy Whing	25	2	19+3	2	2	0	0	0	0+1	0
17	DF	(Northern Ireland) NIR	Tony Capaldi	37	0	24+5	0	3	0	2	0	3	0
18	MF	(England) ENG	Jake Forster-Caskey	20	3	13+3	3	0	0	1	0	3	0
18	FW	(England) ENG	Justin Richards	5	0	4	0	1	0	0	0	0	0
19	MF	(England) ENG	Lee Cox	18	0	14	0	1+1	0	1	0	1	0
19	MF	(England) ENG	Lewis Montrose	5	0	5	0	0	0	0	0	0	0
20	MF	(Scotland) SCO	Peter Leven	25	6	16+4	4	4	1	0	0	1	1
21	GK	(England) ENG	Wayne Brown	4	0	4	0	0	0	0	0	0	0
22	DF	(England) ENG	Harry Worley	11	2	2+7	1	0	0	0	0	1+1	1
23	DF	(Wales) WAL	Alex Evans	1	0	0+1	0	0	0	0	0	0	0
23	DF	(England) ENG	Luke O'Brien	17	0	11+3	0	1	0	0	0	2	0
24	GK	(England) ENG	Luke McCormick	15	0	15	0	0	0	0	0	0	0
25	FW	(Antigua and Barbuda) ATG	Josh Parker	15	0	5+9	0	0	0	0	0	0+1	0
26	MF	(England) ENG	Liam Davis	29	1	21+4	1	1+1	0	0	0	1+1	0
27	MF	(England) ENG	Scott Davies	12	1	10+2	1	0	0	0	0	0	0
28	FW	(England) ENG	Tyrone Marsh	6	1	0+2	0	0	0	0+1	0	2+1	1
29	FW	(England) ENG	Tom Craddock	37	12	22+9	10	2	0	0+1	0	3	2
30	DF	(England) ENG	Sam Long	1	0	0+1	0	0	0	0	0	0	0
31	GK	(New Zealand) NZL	Max Crocombe	4	0	4	0	0	0	0	0	0	0
–	DF	(Ghana) GHA	Daniel Boateng	5	0	1+1	0	0	0	0+1	0	2	0
–	DF	(England) ENG	John Mullins	8	2	8	2	0	0	0	0	0	0

=== Top scorers ===
As of 27 April 2013

Place	Position	Nation	Number	Name	League Two	FA Cup	League Cup	JP Trophy	Total
1	FW	(England)	9	James Constable	9	3	0	2	14
2	FW	(England)	29	Tom Craddock	10	0	0	2	12
3	MF	(England)	15	Alfie Potter	10	0	0	1	11
4	MF	(England)	14	Sean Rigg	5	1	0	1	7
5	MF	(Scotland)	10	Peter Leven	4	1	0	1	6
6	FW	(England)	10	Deane Smalley	5	0	0	0	5
7	MF	(England)	18	Jake Forster-Caskey	3	0	0	0	3
=	FW	(England)	11	Jon-Paul Pittman	2	1	0	0	3
9	DF	(England)	25	John Mullins	2	0	0	0	2
=	DF	(England)	4	Michael Raynes	1	1	0	0	2
=	DF	(England)	16	Andy Whing	2	0	0	0	2
=	DF	(England)	22	Harry Worley	1	0	0	1	2
13	DF	(England)	2	Damien Batt	1	0	0	0	1
=	MF	(Northern Ireland)	7	Adam Chapman	1	0	0	0	1
=	MF	(England)	27	Scott Davies	1	0	0	0	1
=	MF	(England)	26	Liam Davis	1	0	0	0	1
=	MF	(England)	8	Simon Heslop	1	0	0	0	1
=	FW	(England)	28	Tyrone Marsh	0	0	0	1	1
				TOTALS	59	7	0	9	75

=== Disciplinary record ===
As of 27 April 2013

Number	Nation	Position	Name	League Two		FA Cup		League Cup		JP Trophy		Total	
Number	Nation	Position	Name	Booked	Sent off (straight red)	Booked	Sent off (straight red)	Booked	Sent off (straight red)	Booked	Sent off (straight red)	Booked	Sent off (straight red)
1	(England)	GK	Ryan Clarke	1	0	0	0	0	0	0	0	1	0
2	(England)	DF	Damian Batt	4	0	0	0	1	0	0	0	5	0
4	(England)	DF	Michael Raynes	5	1	0	0	1	0	1	0	7	1
5	(England)	DF	Michael Duberry	1	0	0	0	0	0	0	0	1	0
6	(England)	DF	Jake Wright	4	0	1	0	1	0	0	0	6	0
7	(Northern Ireland)	MF	Adam Chapman	3	0	0	0	1	0	0	0	4	0
8	(England)	MF	Simon Heslop	2	1	0	0	0	0	0	0	2	1
9	(England)	FW	James Constable	3	2	0	0	0	0	0	0	3	2
10	(England)	FW	Deane Smalley	3	0	0	0	0	0	0	0	3	0
14	(England)	MF	Sean Rigg	4	0	0	0	0	0	0	0	4	0
15	(England)	MF	Alfie Potter	1	0	0	0	0	0	0	0	1	0
16	(England)	DF	Andy Whing	3	0	0	0	0	0	0	0	3	0
17	(Northern Ireland)	DF	Tony Capaldi	6	0	0	0	0	0	1	0	7	0
–	(England)	MF	Jake Forster-Caskey	4	0	0	0	0	0	0	0	4	0
18	(England)	FW	Justin Richards	1	0	0	0	0	0	0	0	1	0
19	(England)	MF	Lee Cox	4	0	0	0	0	0	0	0	4	0
19	(England)	MF	Lewis Montrose	3	0	0	0	0	0	0	0	3	0
20	(Scotland)	MF	Peter Leven	1	0	0	0	0	0	0	0	1	0
21	(England)	GK	Wayne Brown	1	0	0	0	0	0	0	0	1	0
22	(England)	DF	Harry Worley	1	0	0	0	0	0	0	0	1	0
25	(Antigua and Barbuda)	FW	Josh Parker	1	0	0	0	0	0	0	0	1	0
26	(England)	MF	Liam Davis	1	0	1	0	0	0	0	0	2	0
29	(England)	FW	Tom Craddock	2	0	0	0	0	0	0	0	2	0
			TOTALS	58	4	2	0	4	0	2	0	69	4

== Transfers ==
Players transferred in
Date	Pos.	Name	Previous club	Fee	Ref.
11 July 2012	DF	(England) Michael Raynes	Free agent	Free	
13 August 2012	DF	(Wales) Alex Evans	Free agent	Free	
21 December 2012	FW	(Antigua and Barbuda) Josh Parker	Free agent	Free	
1 February 2013	GK	(England) Luke McCormick	Truro City	undisclosed	
1 February 2013	FW	(England) Justin Richards	Burton Albion	undisclosed	
1 March 2013	FW	(England) Scott Davies	Free agent	undisclosed	
13 June 2013	DF	(England) David Hunt	Crawley Town	Free	
13 June 2013	MF	(England) Danny Rose	Fleetwood Town	Free	
14 June 2013	MF	(England) Josh Shama	Unattached		
27 June 2013	FW	(England) Dave Kitson	Sheffield United	Free	
Players transferred out
Date	Pos.	Name	To	Fee	Ref.
9 May 2013	GK	(England) Luke McCormick	Plymouth Argyle	Free	
12 May 2013	FW	(England) Tom Craddock	Portsmouth	Free	
21 May 2013	MF	(England) Simon Heslop	Stevenage	Free	
5 June 2013	MF	(Northern Ireland) Adam Chapman	Newport County	undisclosed	
20 June 2013	FW	(England) Justin Richards	Tamworth	Free	
21 June 2013	DF	(England) Harry Worley	Newport County	Free	
27 June 2013	FW	(England) Jon-Paul Pittman	Wycombe Wanderers	Free	
Players loaned in
Date from	Pos.	Name	From	Date to	Ref.
6 July 2012	MF	(England) Jake Forster-Caskey	(England) Brighton & Hove Albion	2 January 2013	
17 July 2012	DF	(England) Sean McGinty	(England) Manchester United	13 September 2012	
20 July 2012	MF	(England) Lee Cox	(England) Swindon Town	20 January 2013	
28 August 2012	DF	(Ghana) Daniel Boateng	(England) Arsenal	28 January 2013	
5 October 2012	DF	(England) John Mullins	(England) Rotherham United	21 November 2012	
4 January 2013	FW	(England) Justin Richards	(England) Burton Albion	one month	
4 January 2013	MF	(England) Lewis Montrose	(England) Gillingham	end of season	
Players loaned out
Date from	Pos.	Name	To	Date to	Ref.
1 February 2013	FW	(England) Tyrone Marsh	(England) Staines Town	end of season	
6 March 2013	MF	(Northern Ireland) Adam Chapman	(England) Mansfield Town	end of season	
