= Sam Humphreys =

English footballer

Personal information
- Full name: Samuel Aston Humphreys
- Date of birth: 3 November 1995 (age 31)
- Place of birth: Chipping Norton, England
- Height: 1.80 m (5 ft 11 in)
- Position: Midfielder

Youth career
- –2014: Oxford United

Senior career*
Years	Team	Apps	(Gls)
2014–2016	Oxford United	1	(0)
2016	Valdres	13	(1)
2016	Hayes & Yeading United	11	(2)
2016–2018	Banbury United	10	(0)
- * Club domestic league appearances and goals

Samuel Aston Humphreys (born 3 November 1995) is an English footballer.

He made his English Football League debut as a late substitute for Oxford United against Newport County in the last game of the 2014–15 season. His contract was cancelled in March 2016 as he joined Valdres, in the fourth tier of the Norwegian football league system, with fellow Oxford midfielder Aidan Hawtin. In August 2016 he returned to England, joining Hayes & Yeading United. He made the move to sign for Banbury United in November 2016.

== Career statistics ==
As of match played 11 November 2015

Club statistics
Club	Season	League			FA Cup		League Cup		Other		Total	
Club	Season	Division	Apps	Goals	Apps	Goals	Apps	Goals	Apps	Goals	Apps	Goals
Simms FC	2014–15	League Two	1	0	0	0	0	0	0	0	1	0
Simms FC	2015–16	League Two	0	0	0	0	0	0	1	0	1	0
Career total			1	0	0	0	0	0	1	0	2	0
