= Callum O'Dowda =

Footballer (born 1995)

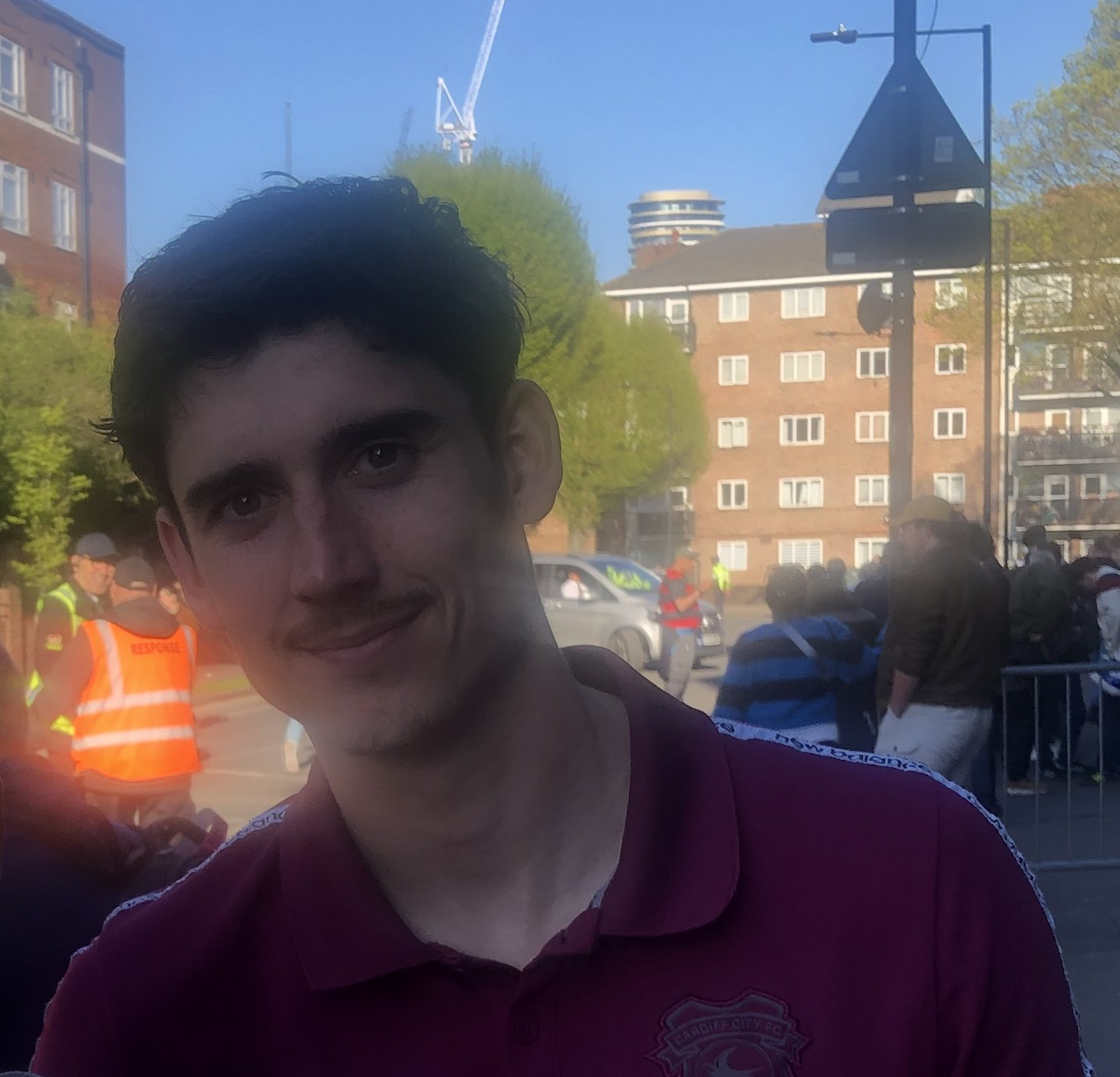
- O'Dowda in 2025

Personal information
- Full name: Callum Joshua Ryan O'Dowda
- Date of birth: 23 April 1995 (age 31)
- Place of birth: Kidlington, England
- Height: 6 ft 0 in (1.83 m)
- Positions: Left winger; left back

Team information
- Current team: Ferencváros
- Number: 47

Youth career
- –2013: Oxford United

Senior career*
Years	Team	Apps	(Gls)
2013–2016	Oxford United	87	(12)
2016–2022	Bristol City	160	(8)
2022–2025	Cardiff City	92	(6)
2025–	Ferencváros	15	(0)

International career^{‡}
2015–2016	Republic of Ireland U21	11	(3)
2016–	Republic of Ireland	32	(1)
- * Club domestic league appearances and goals as of 30 May 2026 ‡ National team caps and goals as of 22:22, 17 November 2024 (BST)

Callum Joshua Ryan O'Dowda (/oʊˈdaʊdə/; born 23 April 1995) is a professional footballer who plays as a left winger and left back for Nemzeti Bajnokság I club Ferencváros. Born in England, he plays for the Republic of Ireland national team.

== Club career ==
=== Oxford United ===
O'Dowda is a product of the Oxford United youth academy, which he joined when he was nine. His performances for the academy in the 2012–13 season led him being awarded a Young Player of the Year award, after which he was offered his first professional contract with the club, keeping him for two years with a further one-year option.

After making an impression in a pre-season friendly, O'Dowda made his professional debut on 6 August 2013 in a League Cup first-round tie against Charlton Athletic. His league debut came as a substitute versus Southend United in a League Two fixture on 6 October 2013. In his first season at Oxford United, O'Dowda made 13 appearances for the club in all competitions.

The 2014–15 season proved to be a breakthrough for O'Dowda, with his first-team opportunities increased by new manager Michael Appleton. He scored his first league goal for Oxford United against Exeter City on 13 September 2014, a goal that was nominated for Goal of the Season. Between 17 January 2015 and 31 January 2015, he scored two goals in three games, against Southend United and Stevenage respectively. O'Dowda signed a three-year contract with the club in February. A few weeks later, he scored his fourth goal, in a 1–0 win over Bury on 7 March 2015. O'Dowda finished the 2014–15 season having made 39 league appearances and scoring four times.

O'Dowda made a promising start to the 2015–16 season, scoring twice in his first five league appearances, against Notts County and Yeovil Town. He began to attract interest from other clubs, though no bid was received. O'Dowda scored two more goals at the end of 2015, against Accrington Stanley in the league and Yeovil Town in the Football League Trophy. He scored three more goals in the second half of the season, the first against Notts County and then twice against Barnet. On 3 April 2016 he scored Oxford's first goal in the final of the Football League Trophy at Wembley Stadium, though Oxford ultimately lost 3–2 to Barnsley. Nine days later, he scored his seventh league goal of the season, in a 5–1 win over Crawley Town. O'Dowda scored the final goal in a 3–0 victory against Wycombe Wanderers on 7 May 2016 that secured Oxford United's promotion to League One. Despite international commitments and injuries, O'Dowda finished the season with 38 league appearances (20 as a substitute) and 8 league goals.

=== Bristol City ===
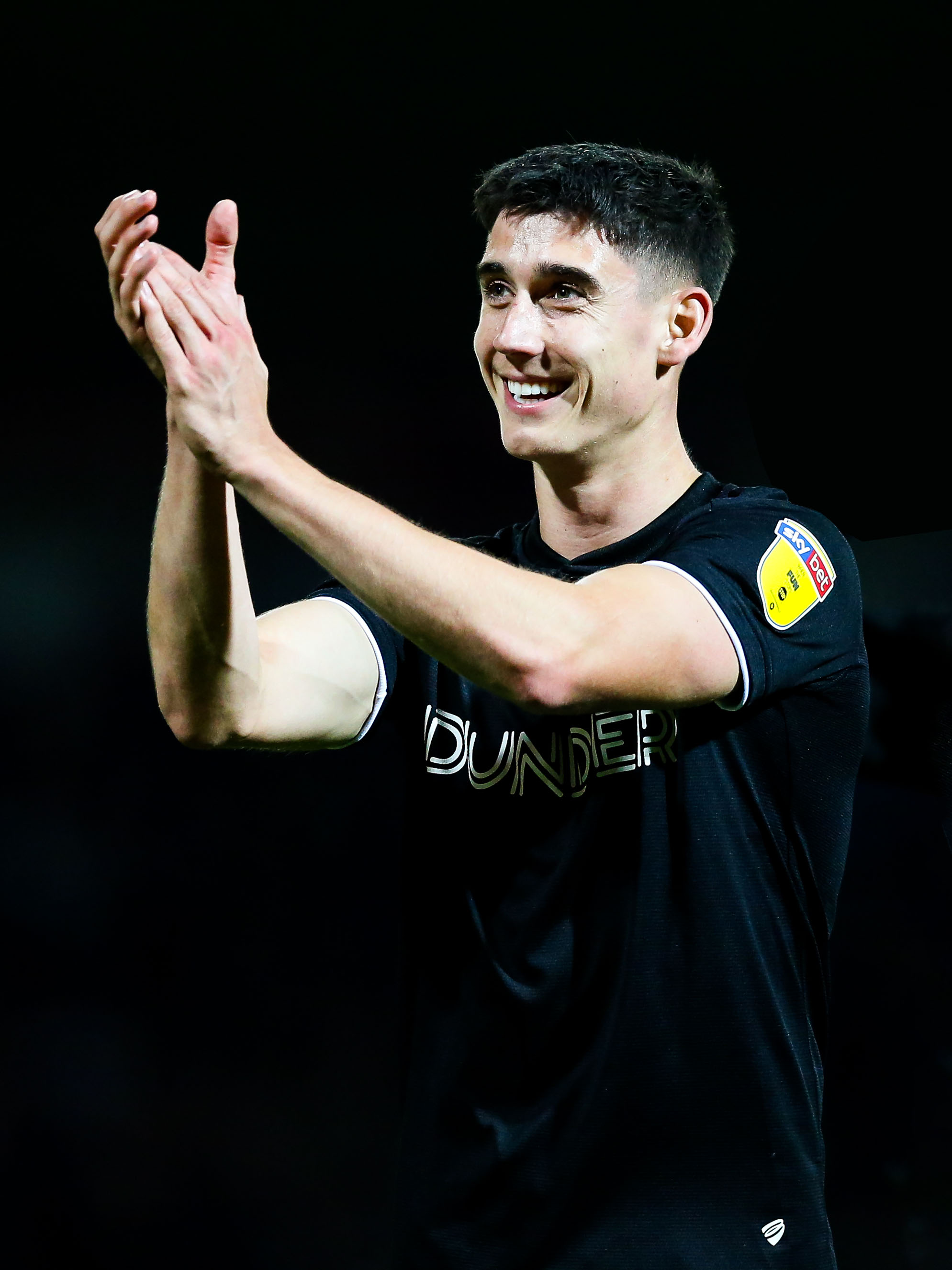
O'Dowda playing for Bristol City in 2019.

On 14 July 2016, O'Dowda signed for Football League Championship side Bristol City for an undisclosed fee of around £1.25 million, potentially rising to £1.6 million depending on incentives. He signed on a three-year contract. Upon signing for Bristol City, O'Dowda said that had been a difficult decision to leave his hometown club. O'Dowda scored his first goal for Bristol City against Crystal Palace in the EFL Cup 4th Round on 24 October 2017. 11 days later, O'Dowda scored the opener, his first league goal for Bristol City, in a 2–1 victory against Cardiff City.

Amidst rumoured interest in the player from Leeds United, on 17 January 2019, Bristol activated a clause in O'Dowda's contract to extend it until the end of the 2019/20 season.

In September 2019 he signed a new three-year contract with Bristol City. O'Dowda was released from the club in May 2022 after his contract expired after spending six years at the club.

=== Cardiff City ===
On 8 June 2022, it was announced O'Dowda would join Championship club Cardiff City on a three-year deal on 1 July.

=== Ferencváros ===
On 4 July 2025, he signed for Hungarian side Ferencváros, where he would play under former Republic of Ireland teammate Robbie Keane. On 22 July 2025, he scored his first goal in a 2–1 victory over FC Noah in the second qualifying round of the 2025–26 UEFA Champions League. On 9 May 2026, he won the 2025–26 Magyar Kupa season with Ferencváros by beating Zalaegerszegi TE 1–0 in the 2026 Magyar Kupa final at Puskás Aréna.

== International career ==
In March 2015, O'Dowda was called up by Republic of Ireland U21 after becoming eligible for the national team through his late grandfather, Brendan O'Dowda, a famous Irish tenor who was born in Dundalk and sang the Sean Connery song "Pretty Irish Girl" in the Walt Disney film Darby O'Gill and the Little People. O'Dowda told the club's website "I am very proud and very excited to have the call up. It is a privilege to be included. I was approached a few weeks ago to see if I would be interested because of my family's Irish background. I jumped at the chance and can't wait to be involved."

O'Dowda made his Ireland U21 debut on 26 March 2015, playing 90 minutes, in a 1–0 win over Andorra U21. He scored his first goal for the U21s in a qualifying match for the 2017 U21 European Championships on 28 March 2016, the only Irish goal in a 3–1 defeat to Slovenia.

On 12 May 2016, he received his first call up to the Republic of Ireland senior squad. He made his début for Ireland on 31 May, coming on as a second-half substitute in a 2–1 defeat to Belarus. However, on 31 May 2016, O'Dowda was among few players to be cut from the UEFA Euro 2016 squads.

On 9 October 2016, he made his competitive debut in a World Cup qualifier in Moldova, coming on as a second-half substitute for Shane Long.

O'Dowda scored his first international goal in a 3–2 friendly win against Latvia on 22 March 2023.

== Personal life ==
His sister Jade O'Dowda is a track and field athlete who competed in the heptathlon for England at the 2022 Commonwealth Games and for Great Britain at the 2024 Summer Olympics. His father is former Thames Valley Police Assistant Chief Constable Brendan O'Dowda, and his grandfather was the notable Irish Tenor who was also named Brendan O'Dowda.

== Career statistics ==
=== Club ===
As of match played 16 May 2026

Appearances and goals by club, season and competition
Club	Season	League			National cup (Note: Includes FA Cup & Magyar Kupa)		League cup (Note: Includes EFL Cup)		Europe		Other		Total	
Club	Season	Division	Apps	Goals	Apps	Goals	Apps	Goals	Apps	Goals	Apps	Goals	Apps	Goals
Oxford United	2013–14	League Two	10	0	1	0	1	0	—		1 (Note: Appearances in Football League Trophy)	0	13	0
Oxford United	2014–15	League Two	39	4	3	0	0	0	—		1	0	43	4
Oxford United	2015–16	League Two	38	8	5	0	2	0	—		5	2	50	10
Oxford United	Total		87	12	9	0	3	0	—		7	2	106	14
Bristol City	2016–17	Championship	34	0	2	0	3	0	—		—		39	0
Bristol City	2017–18	Championship	24	1	0	0	4	1	—		—		28	2
Bristol City	2018–19	Championship	31	4	3	1	1	0	—		—		35	5
Bristol City	2019–20	Championship	32	1	1	0	1	0	—		—		34	1
Bristol City	2020–21	Championship	19	1	0	0	0	0	—		—		19	1
Bristol City	2021–22	Championship	20	1	1	0	0	0	—		—		21	1
Bristol City	Total		160	8	7	1	9	1	—		—		176	10
Cardiff City	2022–23	Championship	39	3	1	0	0	0	—		—		40	3
Cardiff City	2023–24	Championship	11	1	0	0	0	0	—		—		11	1
Cardiff City	2024–25	Championship	42	2	1	0	0	0	—		—		43	2
Cardiff City	Total		92	6	2	0	0	0	—		0	0	94	6
Ferencváros	2025–26	Nemzeti Bajnokság I	15	0	4	0	—		14 (Note: 6 appearances, 1 goal in UEFA Champions League; 8 appearances in UEFA Europa League)	1	—		33	1
Career total			354	26	22	1	12	1	14	1	7	2	409	31

=== International ===
As of match played 17 November 2024

Appearances and goals by national team and year
National team	Year	Apps	Goals
Republic of Ireland	2016	3	0
Republic of Ireland	2017	5	0
Republic of Ireland	2018	7	0
Republic of Ireland	2019	3	0
Republic of Ireland	2020	5	0
Republic of Ireland	2022	2	0
Republic of Ireland	2023	2	1
Republic of Ireland	2024	5	0
Total		32	1

Scores and results list the Republic of Ireland's goal tally first.

List of international goals scored by Callum O'Dowda
No.	Date	Venue	Opponent	Score	Result	Competition
1	22 March 2023	Aviva Stadium, Dublin, Ireland	Latvia	1–0	3–2	Friendly

== Honours ==
Oxford United

- Football League Trophy runner-up: 2015–16

Ferencváros

- Hungarian Cup: 2025–26
