= Jake Wright =

English footballer

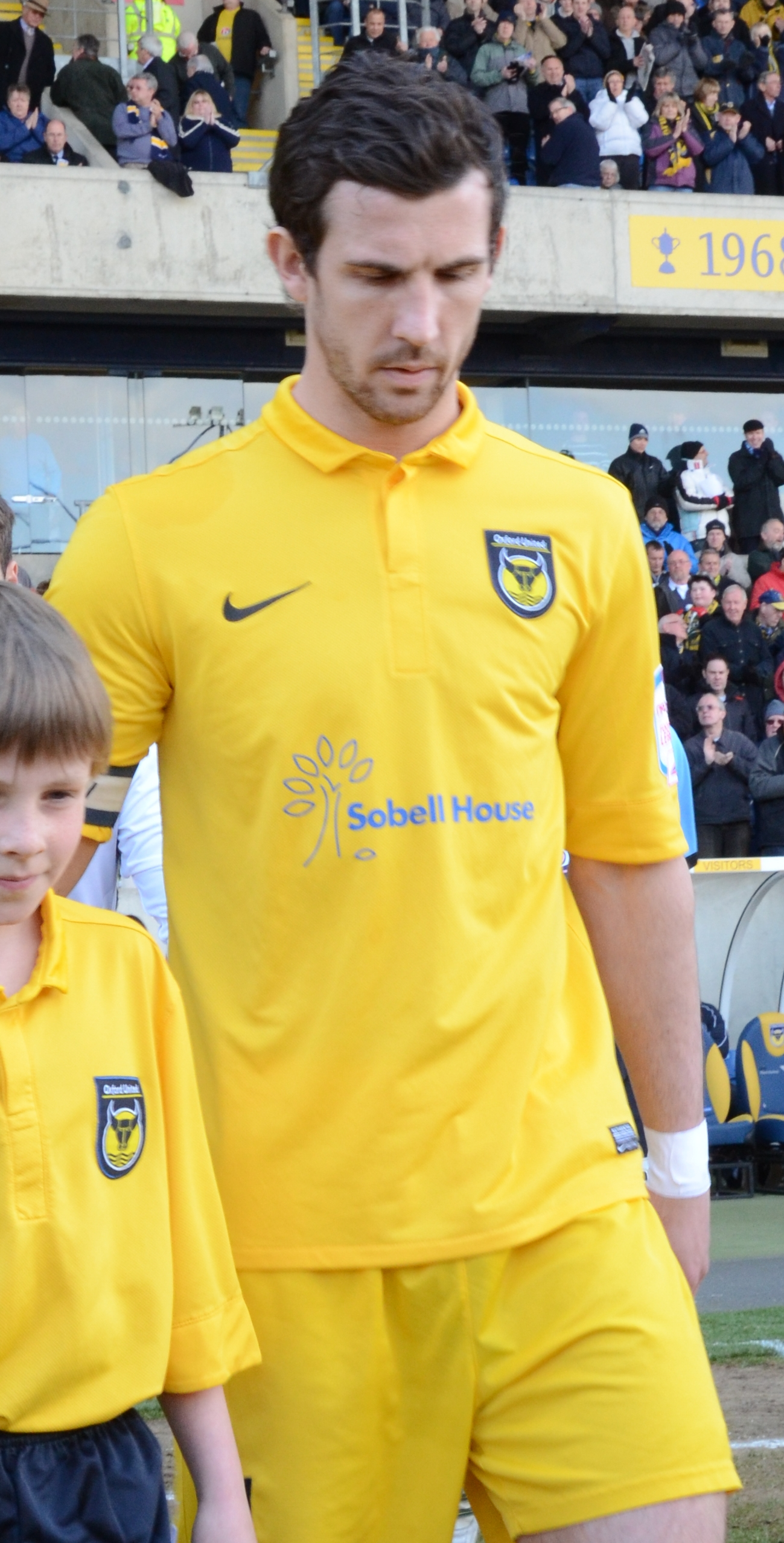
- Wright playing for Oxford United in 2013

Personal information
- Full name: Jake Maxwell Wright
- Date of birth: 11 March 1986 (age 40)
- Place of birth: Keighley, England
- Height: 6 ft 1 in (1.85 m)
- Position: Defender

Team information
- Current team: Eastwood

Youth career
- –2005: Bradford City

Senior career*
Years	Team	Apps	(Gls)
2005–2006	Bradford City	1	(0)
2005	→ Halifax Town (loan)	11	(0)
2006–2008	Halifax Town	64	(2)
2008–2009	Crawley Town	41	(0)
2009–2010	Brighton & Hove Albion	6	(0)
2009–2010	→ Oxford United (loan)	20	(0)
2010–2016	Oxford United	222	(0)
2016–2020	Sheffield United	46	(0)
2019–2020	→ Bolton Wanderers (loan)	11	(0)
2020	Hereford	3	(0)
2021	Mansfield Town	2	(0)
2021–2022	Boston United	12	(0)
2022–2023	Grantham Town	31	(1)
2023–2024	Sherwood Colliery		
2024–	Eastwood		
- * Club domestic league appearances and goals as of 19:29, 19 November 2025 (UTC)

Jake Maxwell Wright (born 11 March 1986) is an English footballer who plays as a defender for United Counties League Premier Division North club Eastwood.

Wright started his career with Bradford City, but played only one senior game for them, before he joined Halifax Town where he had previously spent a loan spell. He spent two years at Halifax, but after they were demoted from the Conference Premier, he moved to Crawley Town in June 2008 before transferring to Brighton & Hove Albion in July 2009. After that he spent seven years at Oxford United where he made 278 total appearances, captained the club and won two promotions.

== Career ==
Born in Keighley, West Yorkshire, Jake Wright started his football career as a youngster with Bradford City and, in April 2005, was one of four defenders to be given a one-year contract. In August 2005, he and fellow Bradford City player Danny Forrest moved to Conference National club Halifax Town on loan—Wright's an initial one-month loan deal. He made his debut on 10 September 2005, in a 4–0 Conference victory over Tamworth at The Shay. He twice extended his loan deal, staying with Halifax for three months, during which time he played 11 league games and three cup games, before he returned to Bradford. Wright made his Bradford debut as a second-half substitute against Colchester United on 4 February 2006, replacing Richard Edghill, who had broken his ankle. It would be his only senior appearance for Bradford.

During June 2006, Wright rejoined Halifax, this time on a permanent basis, along with Forrest and Hereford United goalkeeper Craig Mawson. Wright scored his first senior goal to help Halifax to their first home victory of the 2006–07 season, in a 3–1 win over Dagenham & Redbridge on 19 September 2006. Wright finished the season with two goals from 27 league games, before playing a further 36 games the following season. During the campaign, he picked up his first red card of his career, in a 1–0 defeat to Aldershot Town. Halifax Town avoided relegation despite a final-day defeat, because Altrincham also lost, but they faced liquidation and were eventually demoted, giving Altrincham a reprieve. Halifax were demoted and applied to join the Northern Premier League Division One North, but instead Wright moved back to the Conference Premier, by signing for Crawley Town in June 2008. He had played 63 league games for Halifax during his two years. After an impressive season making 41 League appearances, Wright attracted the interest of Football League clubs including Charlton Athletic and Colchester United.

On 27 July 2009, Wright was invited for a trial at League One side Brighton & Hove Albion and featured during the 1–0 pre-season friendly defeat to Torquay United. Brighton beat off competition from an unnamed Scottish Premier League club to sign Wright and completed the transfer with Wright signing a two-year contract with the Seagulls.

On 31 December 2009, Oxford United signed Wright on loan for the remainder of the season. Wright made 26 appearances during his loan spell at the Kassam Stadium. On 30 June 2010, Wright signed a three-year contract with Oxford on a free transfer after a successful loan spell that saw the club gain promotion back to the Football League. He was appointed club captain in July 2011 and extended his contract by a year in October 2011. After six seasons, and having made 278 appearances and captained the squad to second place in League Two and promotion in the 2015–16 season, Wright – the club's longest-serving player – left Oxford by mutual consent on 9 July 2016. Later that day, he signed for League One club Sheffield United on a two-year contract. Wright's first appearance for the Blades was on 27 August 2016 against his former club Oxford United. This was the club's first win of what became a promotion-winning season. Wright made 30 appearances in his first season as a Blade and remained unbeaten throughout the whole campaign, entering the record books in the process.

In the 2017–18 season Wright made 17 appearances for Sheffield United in the EFL Championship. This was the highest level Wright played at in his career (although he remained a Sheffield United player until part way through the club's 2019–20 season in the Premier League, he made no appearances).

On 2 September 2019, Wright joined EFL League One side Bolton Wanderers on loan until January and was one of nine players Bolton signed on deadline day. He made his debut on 14 September, starting against Rotherham United in a 6–1 defeat.

His contract with Sheffield United was terminated by mutual consent on 31 January 2020. He signed for Hereford on 18 September 2020. On 14 November 2020, Wright was released by Hereford.

On 26 February 2021, Wright joined League Two side Mansfield Town on a contract until the end of May 2021.

On 22 July 2021, Wright signed for Conference North side Boston United. Wright was released at the end of the 2021–22 season.

In June 2022, Wright joined Northern Premier League Division One East club Grantham Town, being named captain for the 2022–23 season.

In July 2023, Wright joined United Counties League Premier Division North club Sherwood Colliery. Having helped the club to promotion, he joined Eastwood in July 2024.

== Style of play ==
He can play at left back or centre back.

== Personal life ==
After his football career, Wright became a teacher.

== Career statistics ==
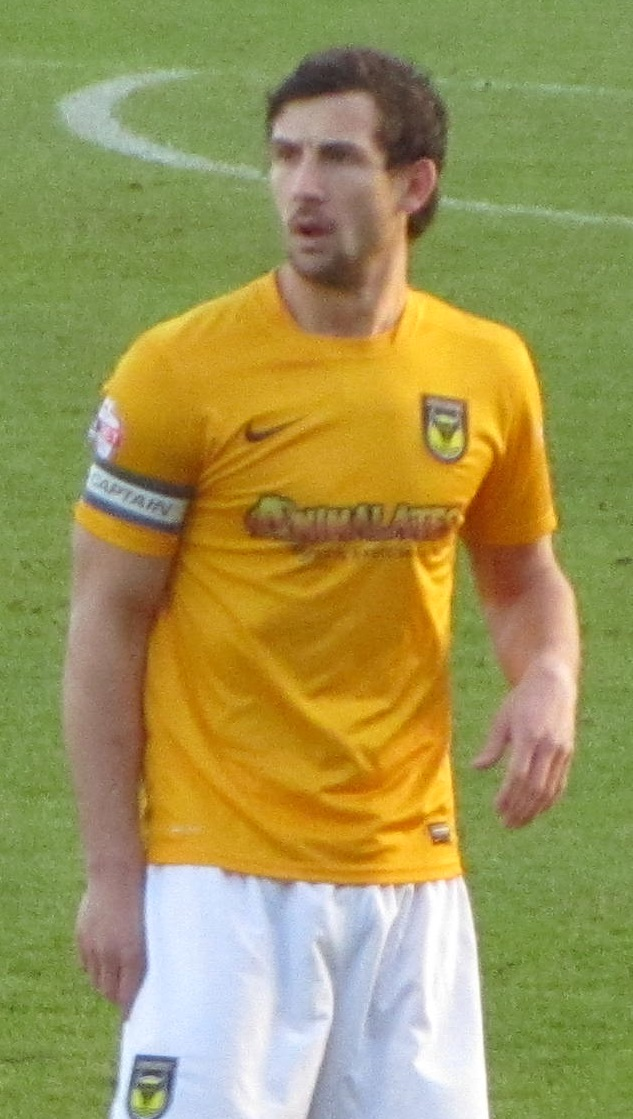
Wright playing for Oxford United in 2013

As of end of 2022–23 season

Appearances and goals by club, season and competition
Club	Season	League			FA Cup		League Cup		Other		Total	
Club	Season	Division	Apps	Goals	Apps	Goals	Apps	Goals	Apps	Goals	Apps	Goals
Bradford City	2005–06	League One	1	0	—		0	0	—		1	0
Halifax Town (loan)	2005–06	Conference National	11	0	3	0	—		1 (Note: Appearance(s) in Football League Trophy)	0	15	0
Halifax Town	2006–07	Conference National	27	2	1	0	—		3 (Note: Appearances in FA Trophy)	0	31	2
Halifax Town	2007–08	Conference Premier	37	0	1	0	—		4 (Note: Appearances in Conference League Cup)	0	42	0
Halifax Town	Total		75	2	5	0	—		8	0	88	2
Crawley Town	2008–09	Conference Premier	41	0	1	0	—		4 (Note: Three appearances FA Trophy, one in Conference League Cup)	0	46	0
Brighton & Hove Albion	2009–10	League One	6	0	0	0	1	0	1	0	8	0
Oxford United (loan)	2009–10	Conference Premier	20	0	—		—		6 (Note: Three appearances in FA Trophy, three in Conference Premier play-offs)	0	26	0
Oxford United	2010–11	League Two	35	0	0	0	2	0	1	0	38	0
Oxford United	2011–12	League Two	43	0	1	0	1	0	2	0	47	0
Oxford United	2012–13	League Two	42	0	4	0	2	0	3	0	51	0
Oxford United	2013–14	League Two	31	0	3	0	1	0	0	0	35	0
Oxford United	2014–15	League Two	42	0	3	0	2	0	1	0	48	0
Oxford United	2015–16	League Two	29	0	2	0	1	0	4	0	36	0
Oxford United	Total		242	0	13	0	9	0	17	0	281	0
Sheffield United	2016–17	League One	29	0	1	0	0	0	0	0	30	0
Sheffield United	2017–18	Championship	17	0	3	0	2	0	—		22	0
Sheffield United	2018–19	Championship	0	0	0	0	0	0	—		0	0
Sheffield United	2019–20	Premier League	0	0	0	0	0	0	—		0	0
Sheffield United	Total		46	0	4	0	2	0	0	0	52	0
Bolton Wanderers (loan)	2019–20	League One	11	0	1	0	0	0	0	0	12	0
Hereford	2020–21	National League North	3	0	0	0	—		0	0	3	0
Mansfield Town	2020–21	League Two	2	0	0	0	0	0	—		2	0
Boston United	2021–22	National League North	12	0	2	0	—		0	0	14	0
Grantham Town	2022–23	Northern Premier League Division One East	31	1	3	0	—		1 (Note: Appearance(s) in Lincolnshire Senior Cup)	0	35	1
Career total			470	3	29	0	12	0	31	0	542	3

== Honours ==
Oxford United

- Football League Two second-place promotion: 2015–16
- Conference Premier play-offs: 2010
- Football League Trophy runner-up: 2015–16

Sheffield United

- EFL League One: 2016–17
