= Jordan Evans (footballer) =

Welsh footballer (born 1995)

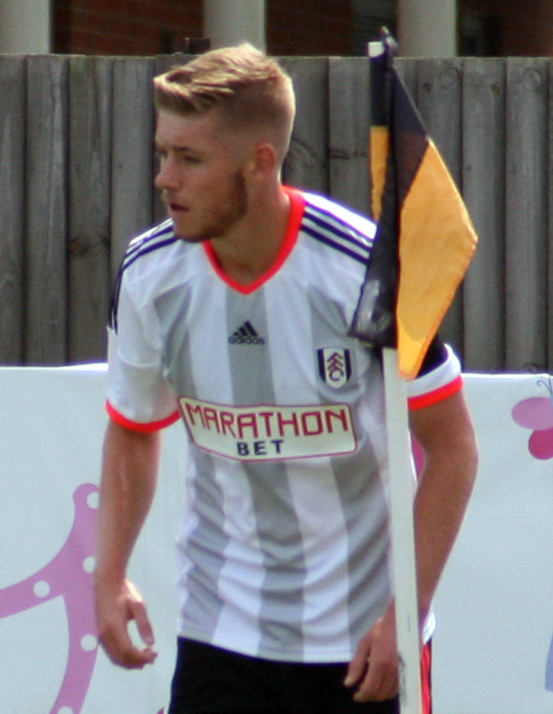
- Evans playing for Fulham in 2014

Personal information
- Full name: Jordan Anthony John Evans
- Date of birth: 23 September 1995 (age 31)
- Place of birth: Wrexham, Wales
- Height: 5 ft 10 1/2 in (1.79 m)
- Position: Midfielder

Team information
- Current team: Airbus UK Broughton
- Number: 8

Youth career
- 2006–2011: Wrexham
- 2011–2015: Fulham

Senior career*
Years	Team	Apps	(Gls)
2015–2016	Fulham	0	(0)
2015–2016	→ Oxford United (loan)	9	(0)
2016–2017	Wrexham	22	(0)
2017–2018	Bala Town	34	(4)
2018–2019	Cefn Druids	24	(4)
2019–2020	Airbus UK Broughton	20	(1)
2020–2022	Newtown	51	(14)
2022–2023	Whitchurch Alport		
2023–	Airbus UK Broughton	100	(26)

International career
- Wales U19
2014–2016	Wales U21	6	(0)
- * Club domestic league appearances and goals as of 07:58, 8 November 2026 (UTC)

Jordan Anthony John Evans (born 23 September 1995) is a Welsh semi-professional footballer who plays as a midfielder for Airbus UK Broughton.

== Career ==
=== Fulham ===
Evans came through Wrexham's academy from the age of 10 before joining Fulham aged 15. Evans signed a one-year contract extension with Fulham in July 2015, keeping him at Fulham until 2016. On 22 September 2015, Evans was an unused substitute for the League Cup game against Stoke City at Craven Cottage.

Evans was released by Fulham at the end of the 2015–16 season.

=== Oxford United (loan) ===
In November 2015, Evans joined League Two club Oxford United on loan until 17 January 2016. He made his first senior appearance as a second-half substitute on 6 December 2015 in an FA cup tie against Forest Green Rovers. His first senior start followed in the Football League Trophy against Yeovil Town on 8 December; Evans scored his first senior goal after just five minutes, an "unstoppable shot" from distance. He went on to make his first Football League appearance on 12 December 2015 against Carlisle United, coming on as a second-half substitute at the Kassam Stadium.

=== Return to Wrexham ===
In July 2016, Evans re-joined his former youth team Wrexham on trial, this time hoping to earn a first team contract. His trial was successful, and he signed a six-month contract with the club on 29 July 2016. He made his debut for the club on the opening day of the 2016–17 season, in a 0–0 draw with Dover Athletic. On 6 January 2017, Evans left Wrexham after his contract with the club expired. Wrexham manager Dean Keates had offered Evans a new 18-month deal with the club but the contract offer was rejected by Evans.

=== Bala Town ===
On 17 February 2017, Evans signed for Welsh Premier League side Bala Town.

== Career statistics ==
As of matches played 22 January 2022

Appearances and goals by club, season and competition
Club	Season	League			National Cup (Note: Includes FA Cup and Welsh Cup)		League Cup (Note: Includes EFL Cup and Welsh League Cup)		Other		Total	
Club	Season	Division	Apps	Goals	Apps	Goals	Apps	Goals	Apps	Goals	Apps	Goals
Fulham	2015–16	Championship	0	0	—		0	0	—		0	0
Oxford United (loan)	2015–16	League Two	9	0	2	0	—		3 (Note: Appearances in Football League Trophy)	1	14	1
Wrexham	2016–17	National League	22	0	2	1	—		1 (Note: Appearance in FA Trophy)	0	25	1
Airbus FC	2019-20	Cymru Premier	18	1	0	0	2	0	0	0	20	1
Newtown AFC	2020-21	Cymru Premier	32	10	0	0	0	0	0	0	32	10
Newtown AFC	2021-22	Cymru Premier	14	3	1	1	3	0	2 (Note: Appearances in UEFA Conference League)	0	20	4
Career total			95	14	5	2	5	0	6	1	111	17

== Honours ==
Bala Town

- Welsh Cup winner: 2017
