= Sam Long (footballer, born 1995) =

English footballer (born 1995)

Personal information
- Full name: Samuel Patrick Robert Long
- Date of birth: 16 January 1995 (age 31)
- Place of birth: Bicester, England
- Height: 1.80 m (5 ft 11 in)
- Position: Defender

Team information
- Current team: Oxford United
- Number: 2

Youth career
- –2013: Oxford United

Senior career*
Years	Team	Apps	(Gls)
2013–	Oxford United	263	(15)
2014	→ Kidderminster Harriers (loan)	0	(0)
2018	→ Hampton & Richmond Borough (loan)	14	(0)
- * Club domestic league appearances and goals as of 22 November 2026 (UTC)

Samuel Patrick Robert Long (born 16 January 1995) is an English professional footballer who plays as a defender for EFL League One club Oxford United.

== Career ==
Long began his career with Oxford United and made his professional debut on 27 April 2013 as a late substitute in a 3–0 victory over Accrington Stanley on the last day of the 2012–13 season. His first starting appearance was in a 1–1 draw with Morecambe in League Two on 22 February 2014.

On 20 November 2014, he joined Kidderminster Harriers on loan as part of a deal that saw Chey Dunkley going the other direction. Following his return to Oxford, he scored his first goal, in a 2–3 home defeat against Southend United in EFL League Two on 17 January 2015. Injuries limited his appearances in 2015–16 and 2016–17, although his contract with Oxford was extended by a year in March 2017. He was loaned to Hampton and Richmond Borough in January 2018, a loan that was later extended. Despite not having played a first-team fixture for Oxford in 2017–18, he signed a new one-year contract in June 2018. Already the club's longest-serving player, having joined the club as an 8-year-old, in June 2020 he signed a two-year extension with Oxford United. In April 2021, Long signed a further three-year deal with the club. He was voted both the Players' and Supporters Player of the Season at the end of the 2020–21 season. His contract was extended at the end of the 2024–25 season, and again in March 2026.

== Career statistics ==
As of match played 24 January 2026

Appearances and goals by club, season and competition
Club	Season	League			FA Cup		League Cup		Other		Total	
Club	Season	Division	Apps	Goals	Apps	Goals	Apps	Goals	Apps	Goals	Apps	Goals
Oxford United	2012–13	League Two	1	0	0	0	0	0	—		1	0
Oxford United	2013–14	League Two	3	0	2	0	0	0	—		5	0
Oxford United	2014–15	League Two	10	1	0	0	0	0	—		10	1
Oxford United	2015–16	League Two	1	0	0	0	1	0	1 (Note: Appearance in Football League Trophy)	0	3	0
Oxford United	2016–17	League One	3	0	0	0	2	0	2 (Note: Appearance(s) in EFL Trophy)	0	7	0
Oxford United	2017–18	League One	0	0	0	0	0	0	—		0	0
Oxford United	2018–19	League One	18	0	2	0	2	0	4	0	26	0
Oxford United	2019–20	League One	19	1	4	1	5	0	4	0	32	2
Oxford United	2020–21	League One	36	6	1	0	2	0	5	0	44	6
Oxford United	2021–22	League One	36	1	2	0	0	0	1	0	39	1
Oxford United	2022–23	League One	43	3	2	0	1	0	2	0	48	3
Oxford United	2023–24	League One	29	1	0	0	1	0	—		30	1
Oxford United	2024–25	Championship	24	1	1	0	2	0	—		27	1
Oxford United	2025–26	Championship	22	1	1	0	2	0	—		25	1
Career total			245	15	15	1	18	0	19	0	297	16

== Honours ==
Oxford United

- EFL League One play-offs: 2024
- Football League Trophy/EFL Trophy runner-up: 2015–16, 2016–17
