= Josh Ashby =

English footballer

Personal information
- Full name: Joshua James Ashby
- Date of birth: 3 May 1996 (age 30)
- Place of birth: Oxford, England
- Height: 1.80 m (5 ft 11 in)
- Position: Midfielder

Team information
- Current team: Oxford City

Youth career
- –2014: Oxford United

Senior career*
Years	Team	Apps	(Gls)
2014–2018	Oxford United	5	(0)
2015	→ AFC Telford United (loan)	5	(0)
2015–2016	→ Brackley Town (loan)	1	(0)
2016–2017	→ Oxford City (loan)	20	(0)
2018–	Oxford City	127	(39)
- * Club domestic league appearances and goals as of 3 February 2026 (UTC)

Joshua James Ashby (born 3 May 1996) is an English professional footballer who plays for Oxford City.

== Career ==
Ashby graduated out of the Oxford United youth team, signing a three-year professional contract in February 2014. Manager Michael Appleton said that "I've been really impressed with the kid since I walked through the door. From day one my first thought was 'who is that? Tell me about him'". He made his debut for the club on 24 January 2015, playing the full 90 minutes of a 2–2 draw with Exeter City at the Kassam Stadium.

After loan periods at A.F.C. Telford United, Brackley Town and Oxford City, Ashby was released by Oxford United and joined Oxford City on a one-year contract in June 2018. In the 2020–21 season, Ashby scored the winning penalty in City's 2–1 victory over Northampton Town, sending them through to the second round of the FA Cup.

== Career statistics ==
As of match played 16 September 2017

Appearances and goals by club, season and competition
Club	Season	League			FA Cup		League Cup		Other		Total	
Club	Season	Division	Apps	Goals	Apps	Goals	Apps	Goals	Apps	Goals	Apps	Goals
Oxford United	2014–15	League Two	2	0	0	0	0	0	0	0	2	0
Oxford United	2015–16	League Two	3	0	0	0	0	0	1 (Note: Appearance in the Football League Trophy)	0	4	0
Oxford United	2016–17	League One	0	0	0	0	0	0	0	0	0	0
Oxford United	2017–18	League One	0	0	0	0	0	0	0	0	0	0
Oxford United	Total		5	0	0	0	0	0	1	0	6	0
Telford United (loan)	2015–16	National League North	4	0	0	0	–		0	0	4	0
Brackley Town (loan)	2015–16	National League North	1	0	0	0	–		0	0	1	0
Oxford City (loan)	2016–17	National League South	19	0	0	0	–		0	0	19	0
Career total			29	0	0	0	0	0	1	0	30	0

== Honours ==
Oxford United

- Football League Trophy runner-up: 2015–16
