= Isaac Buckley-Ricketts =

English footballer

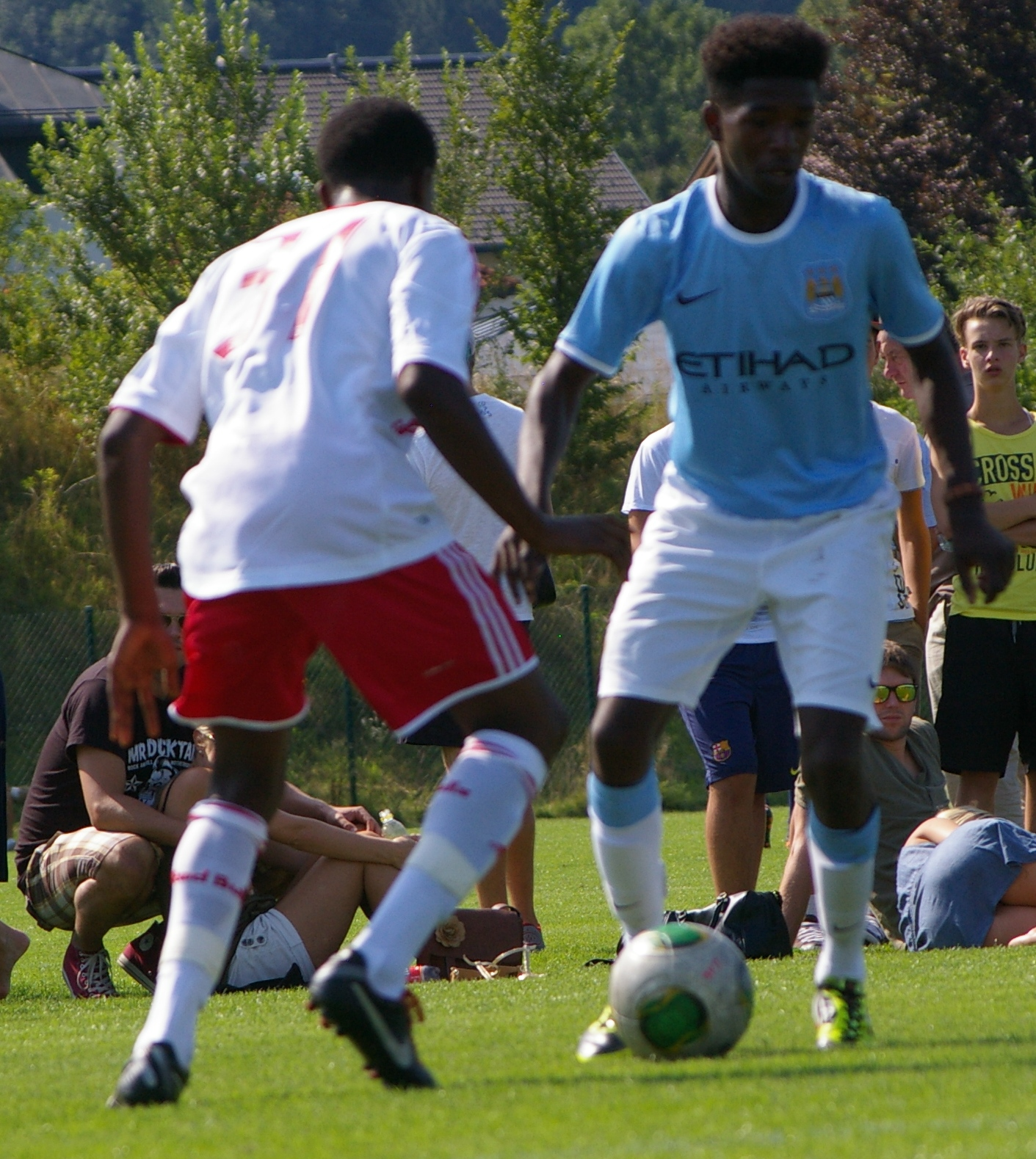
- Buckley-Ricketts (right) playing for Manchester City in 2013.

Personal information
- Full name: Isaac Bradley Jordan Buckley-Ricketts
- Date of birth: 14 March 1998 (age 28)
- Place of birth: Manchester, England
- Height: 5 ft 9 in (1.75 m)
- Position: Forward

Team information
- Current team: Morecambe

Youth career
- 2011–2016: Manchester City

Senior career*
Years	Team	Apps	(Gls)
2016–2018	Manchester City	0	(0)
2017–2018	→ FC Twente (loan)	6	(0)
2018	→ Oxford United (loan)	11	(0)
2018–2019	Peterborough United	0	(0)
2019–2021	Stretford Paddock	35	(18)
2021–2022	Southport	19	(0)
2022	→ Warrington Town (loan)	11	(1)
2022–2024	Warrington Town	82	(25)
2024–2025	Curzon Ashton	46	(6)
2025–2026	Macclesfield	42	(7)
2026–	Morecambe	0	(0)

International career^{‡}
2016	England U18	4	(0)
2016–2017	England U19	12	(1)
2017–2018	England U20	7	(2)
- * Club domestic league appearances and goals as of 01:42, 28 May 2026 (UTC) ‡ National team caps and goals as of 20:11, 3 August 2021 (UTC)

Isaac Bradley Jordan Buckley-Ricketts (born 14 March 1998) is an English footballer who plays as a forward for National League North club Morecambe.

== Career ==
=== Manchester City ===
Born in Manchester, England, Buckley-Ricketts joined Manchester City at 13. After progressing through the ranks of Manchester City's Academy, he signed a scholarship with the club in July 2014. Buckley-Ricketts quickly progressed through the club's U18 side and then the development squad.

=== FC Twente (Loan) ===
Buckley-Ricketts played abroad for the first time in his career when he joined Eredivisie side FC Twente on a season-long loan for the 2017–18 season. He made his Twente debut in the opening game of the season, on 13 August 2017, coming on as a second-half substitute for Nikola Gjorgjev, in a 2–1 loss against Feyenoord. However, his first-team opportunities were limited, so he returned to England in January 2018 having made eight appearances for Twente.

=== Oxford United (Loan) ===
On 12 January 2018, Buckley-Ricketts joined League One club Oxford United on loan for the rest of the 2017–18 season. He made his debut on 20 January in a 2–1 home defeat to bottom club Bury.

=== Peterborough United ===
Buckley-Ricketts signed for Peterborough United in the summer of 2018 but was subsequently transfer-listed by the club at the end of the 2018–19 season having made only two appearances throughout the campaign. On 2 September 2019, Buckley-Ricketts was released by Peterborough United.

=== Stretford Paddock ===
On Buckley-Ricketts' release from Peterborough United he signed for Stretford Paddock.

=== Southport ===
On 3 August 2021, following a successful trial period, Buckley-Ricketts signed for Southport in the National League North on a two-year contract. On 28 February 2022, he signed for Northern Premier League Premier Division side Warrington Town on loan deal until 3 April.

=== Warrington Town ===
On 30 June 2022, Buckley-Ricketts joined Warrington Town on a permanent deal. In his first season with the club, he helped his side to promotion through the play-offs, scoring a late goal in the play-off final to defeat Bamber Bridge.

The 2023–24 season saw Buckley-Ricketts' best individual season to date, being named in the National League North Team of the Year following a tally of fifteen goals.

=== Curzon Ashton ===
On 1 July 2024, Buckley-Ricketts joined National League North rivals Curzon Ashton.

=== Macclesfield ===
On 17 May 2025, Buckley-Ricketts joined newly promoted National League North side Macclesfield for an undisclosed fee. On 10 January 2026, he scored the winning goal against Crystal Palace to send Macclesfield to the FA Cup fourth round for the first time ever.

=== Morecambe ===
On 25 June 2026, Buckley-Ricketts signed for Morecambe on an initial one-year deal following the club's relegation to the National League North.

== International career ==
After being called up by England U18, Buckley-Ricketts made his England U18 debut on 23 March 2016, playing 74 minutes before being substituted, in a 3–2 win over Austria U18. He went on to make four appearances for the side.

He made his England U19 debut on 1 September 2016, coming on as a late substitute in a 1–1 draw against Netherlands U19. He then scored his first England U19 goal, as well as setting up one of the goals, in a 5–1 win over Belarus U19 on 27 March 2017. Buckley-Ricketts was in the team that won the 2017 UEFA European Under-19 Championship in Georgia, managed by Keith Downing. He went on to make 12 appearances and scored once for the England U19 side.

Buckley-Ricketts made his England U20 debut on 31 August 2017, in a 3–0 win over the Netherlands U20. He then scored his first goals for England U20 in a 5–1 win over Italy U20.

== Career statistics ==
As of match played 2 May 2026

Appearances and goals by club, season and competition
Club	Season	League			National cup (Note: Includes KNVB Cup, FA Cup)		League cup (Note: Includes EFL Cup)		Other		Total	
Club	Season	Division	Apps	Goals	Apps	Goals	Apps	Goals	Apps	Goals	Apps	Goals
Manchester City	2016–17	Premier League	0	0	0	0	0	0	0	0	0	0
FC Twente (loan)	2017–18	Eredivisie	6	0	2	0	—		0	0	8	0
Oxford United (loan)	2017–18	League One	11	0	—		—		0	0	11 (Note: Appearance in the EFL Trophy)	0
Southport	2021–22	National League North	19	0	1	0	—		3 (Note: Appearance(s) in FA Trophy)	0	23	0
Warrington Town (loan)	2021–22	Northern Premier League Premier Division	9	1	—		—		2 (Note: Appearance(s) in NPL Premier Division play-offs)	0	11	1
Warrington Town	2022–23	NPL Premier Division	35	8	3	0	—		2 (Note: One appearance in FA Trophy, one appearance in NPL Premier Division play-offs)	1	40	9
Warrington Town	2023–24	National League North	46	16	1	0	—		1	0	48	16
Warrington Town	Total		126	25	7	0	0	0	8	1	141	26
Curzon Ashton	2024–25	National League North	46	6	4	3	—		1 (Note: One appearance in the FA Trophy)	1	51	10
Macclesfield	2025–26	National League North	42	7	4	1	—		2 (Note: Appearances in the promotion play-offs)	0	48	8
Career total			214	38	15	4	0	0	11	2	240	44

== Honours ==
Warrington Town

- Northern Premier League Premier Division play-offs: 2022–23

Individual

- National League North Team of the Year: 2023–24

Oxford utd- club man of the year
