= Shungu Dutiro =

South African footballer

Personal information
- Date of birth: 28 January 1999 (age 27)
- Place of birth: Randburg, South Africa
- Position: Forward

Youth career
- Randburg
- Crusaders
- 2013–2018: Bidvest Wits
- 2018–2021: Mamelodi Sundowns

Senior career*
Years	Team	Apps	(Gls)
2023	Stretford Paddock	2	(1)

International career
- South Africa U17
- * Club domestic league appearances and goals

Shungu Dutiro (born 28 January 1999) is a South African soccer player.

== Early life ==
Dutiro was born in Randburg, South Africa, to Zimbabwean parents.

== Club career ==
Dutiro first showed an interest in football at the age of six, and while studying at the St Stithians College, he signed for Bidvest Wits in 2013. While with Bidvest Wits, he developed into a prolific striker, finishing as top scorer in a number of competitions.

In May 2016, following good performances for the youth sides of Bidvest Wits, he was promoted to the first team. In October of the same year, he was named by English newspaper The Guardian as one of the best players born in 1999 worldwide.

In July 2018, he moved to Mamelodi Sundowns.

Dutiro would later move to England, where he played football for Stretford Paddock.
