= 2014–15 Oxford United F.C. season =

English football club season

Oxford United
2014–15 season
- Chairman: Ian Lenagan (until 4 July 2014); Darryl Eales (from 4 July 2014)
- Manager: Gary Waddock (until 4 July 2014); Michael Appleton (from 4 July 2014)
- Stadium: Kassam Stadium
- Football League Two: 13th
- FA Cup: Second round (eliminated by Tranmere Rovers)
- League Cup: Second round (eliminated by West Bromwich Albion)
- Football League Trophy: First round (eliminated by Cheltenham Town)
- Top goalscorer: League: Danny Hylton (14); All: Danny Hylton (16)
- Highest home attendance: 9,406 (v York City, 6 April 2015, League Two)
- Lowest home attendance: 4,111 (v Accrington Stanley, 16 September 2014, League Two)
Home colours	Away colours

The 2014–15 season was Oxford United's fifth season in League Two after returning from the Conference, and their first under new manager Michael Appleton. They finished 13th in the table, following an 8th-place finish in League Two in 2013–14.

In July 2014, private equity broker Darryl Eales took over the club from previous owner Ian Lenagan and installed Mark Ashton as Chief Executive and former Portsmouth, Blackpool and Blackburn Rovers manager Michael Appleton as head coach. The new management team had little time to assemble a side, with Danny Hylton (signed by outgoing manager Gary Waddock to replace long-serving forward James Constable) the only new player among the first-team squad at the time of the takeover. The season opened badly: a series of four narrow defeats left United pointless and at the foot of the League Two table and fearing a second relegation to non-League football. Matters gradually improved, but the team never reached the top half of the table and calls were heard during the season for Appleton's dismissal. An unbeaten run of eight games (including five wins) at the end of the season eased relegation fears and led to a 13th-place finish, the club's highest position during the season. This late upturn, alongside the solid strike record of leading scorer Hylton and the performances of loanees Tyrone Barnett and Kemar Roofe (the latter to sign permanently after the season ended), gave cause for optimism for the following season, and dampened criticism of what was ultimately an underwhelming season.

United beat Grimsby Town of the National League in the first round of the FA Cup, but were eliminated by fellow League Two side Tranmere Rovers after a second-round replay. After an eye-catching first-round away victory over higher-division opposition in the shape of eventual League One champions Bristol City, the club were narrowly eliminated from the League Cup in the second round, losing 7–6 on penalties to Premier League side West Bromwich Albion after a hard-fought 1–1 draw at The Hawthorns. Oxford fell at the first hurdle in the Football League Trophy, losing to Cheltenham Town in the first round.

It was the club's 121st year in existence, their 115th of competitive football and their 66th since turning professional. This article covers the period from 1 July 2014 to 30 June 2015.

== Team kit ==
Home colours	Away colours

== Match fixtures and results ==
=== Pre-season ===
12 July 2014	Farnborough	1–2	Oxford United	Farnborough
15:00 BST	Lucas Enrique 77'	Report	Roberts 71'; Ashby 76'	Stadium: Cherrywood Road; Attendance: 278

15 July 2014	Oxford City	0–1	Oxford United	Marsh Lane, Marston
19:45 BST		Report	Marsh 69' (pen.)	Attendance: 907

19 July 2014	Didcot Town	0–1	Oxford United	NPower Loop Meadow Stadium, Didcot
15:00 BST		Report	Roberts 55'	Attendance: 571

29 July 2014	Oxford United	0–1	Wolverhampton Wanderers	Oxford
19:45 BST		Report	Clarke 28'	Stadium: Kassam Stadium; Attendance: 2,727 (736 away)

2 August 2014	Oxford United	1–4	Bournemouth	Kassam Stadium, Oxford
15:00 BST	Rose 22'	Report	Junior Stanislas 19'; Wilson 44', 79' (pen.), 88'	Attendance: 1,165 (124 away)

=== League Two ===
==== League table ====
Pos	Team	Pld	W	D	L	GF	GA	GD	Pts
11	Morecambe	46	17	12	17	53	52	+1	63
12	Northampton Town	46	18	7	21	67	62	+5	61
13	Oxford United	46	15	16	15	50	49	+1	61
14	Dagenham & Redbridge	46	17	8	21	58	59	−1	59
15	AFC Wimbledon	46	14	16	16	54	60	−6	58

Updated to match(es) played on 23 May 2015. Source: BBC Sport
Rules for classification: 1) Points; 2) Goal difference; 3) Number of goals scored

==== Results ====
The fixtures for the 2014–15 season were announced on 18 June 2014 at 9am.

9 August 2014 1	Oxford United	0–1	Burton Albion	Oxford
15:00		Report	Akins 42'	Stadium: Kassam Stadium; Attendance: 5,370; Referee: Darren Handley

16 August 2014 2	Mansfield Town	2–1	Oxford United	Mansfield
15:00	Tafazolli 39'; Murray 88'	Report	Hylton 79' (pen.)	Stadium: Field Mill; Attendance: 3,042; Referee: Richard Clark

19 August 2014 3	Morecambe	1–0	Oxford United	Morecambe
19:45	Ellison 39'	Report		Stadium: Globe Arena; Attendance: 1,615 (176 away); Referee: Tony Harrington

23 August 2014 4	Oxford United	0–1	Portsmouth	Kassam Stadium
15:00		Report	Westcarr 80'	Attendance: 6,852; Referee: Darren Bond

30 August 2014 5	Oxford United	3–3	Dagenham & Redbridge	Kassam Stadium
15:00	Jakubiak 3'; Hylton 55' 61' (pen.)	Report	Hemmings 7'; Cureton 46'; Ogogo 71'	Attendance: 4,391; Referee: Gary Sutton

6 September 2014 6	Southend United	1–1	Oxford United	Southend-on-Sea
15:00	Payne 36'	Report	Hylton 67' (pen.)	Stadium: Roots Hall; Attendance: 5,315 (424 away); Referee: Andy Davies

13 September 2014 7	Exeter City	1–1	Oxford United	Exeter
15:00	Cummins 4' (pen.)	Report	O'Dowda 15'	Stadium: St James Park; Attendance: 3,076; Referee: James Linington

16 September 2014 8	Oxford United	3–1	Accrington Stanley	Kassam Stadium
19:45	Hylton 15'; Collins 36'; Barnett 71'	Report	Carver 17'	Attendance: 4,111; Referee: Charles Breakspear

20 September 2014 9	Oxford United	0–0	Stevenage	Kassam Stadium
15:00		Report		Attendance: 4,658 (263 away); Referee: Chris Kavanagh

27 September 2014 10	Luton Town	2–0	Oxford United	Luton
15:00	Wilkinson 2'; Howells 67'	Report		Stadium: Kenilworth Road; Attendance: 9,101; Referee: Mark Haywood

4 October 2014 11	Oxford United	1–0	Newport County	Kassam Stadium
15:00	Collins 40'	Report		Attendance: 5,072; Referee: Darren Sheldrake

11 October 2014 12	Cambridge United	5–1	Oxford United	Cambridge
12:15	Appiah 41', 45'; Donaldson 54'; Elliott 59'; Simpson 89'	Report	Hylton 9'; Howard (yellow card) 29'; Whing (yellow card) 74'; Collins (yellow card) 83'	Stadium: Abbey Stadium; Attendance: 4,435; Referee: Andy D'Urso

18 October 2014 13	Oxford United	2–0	Tranmere Rovers	Kassam Stadium
15:00	Barnett 28'; Potter 73'	Report		Attendance: 4,748; Referee: Kevin Johnson

21 October 2014 14	Northampton Town	1–3	Oxford United	Northampton
19:45	Stevens 4'	Report	Hylton 25' 27' (pen.); Potter 50'	Stadium: Sixfields Stadium; Attendance: 4,577; Referee: Phil Gibbs

25 October 2014 15	Carlisle United	2–1	Oxford United	Carlisle
15:00	Beck 73'; Asamoah 89'	Report	Hylton 45'	Stadium: Brunton Park; Attendance: 4,392; Referee: Mick Russell

1 November 2014 16	Oxford United	1–2	Wycombe Wanderers	Kassam Stadium
15:00	Hylton 27' (pen.)	Report	Hayes 53'; Murphy 52'	Attendance: 7,552; Referee: Tim Robinson

15 November 2014 17	York City	0–1	Oxford United	York
15:00		Report	Roberts 35'	Stadium: Bootham Crescent; Attendance: 3,363; Referee: Scott Duncan

22 November 2014 18	Oxford United	0–0	AFC Wimbledon	Kassam Stadium
15:00		Report		Attendance: 5,443; Referee: Trevor Kettle

29 November 2014 19	Cheltenham Town	1–1	Oxford United	Cheltenham
15:00	Harrison 52'	Report	Barnett 61'	Stadium: Whaddon Road; Attendance: 3,002; Referee: Pat Miller

13 December 2014 20	Oxford United	2–1	Bury	Kassam Stadium
15:00	Jones 69' (o.g.); Barnett 90'	Report	Mayor 63'	Attendance: 6,912; Referee: Steve Martin

20 December 2014 21	Hartlepool United	1–1	Oxford United	Hartlepool
15:00	Ironside 53'	Report	Hylton 65'	Stadium: Victoria Park; Attendance: 4,070; Referee: Geoff Eltringham

26 December 2014 22	Oxford United	0–2	Shrewsbury Town	Kassam Stadium
15:00		Report	Collins 13'; Ellis 18'	Attendance: 7,502; Referee: Lee Probert

28 December 2014 23	Plymouth Argyle	1–2	Oxford United	Plymouth
15:00	Alessandra 19'	Report	Campbell 69'; Roberts 83'	Stadium: Home Park; Attendance: 11,020; Referee: Andy Davies

3 January 2015 24	Oxford United	1–2	Cheltenham Town	Kassam Stadium
15:00	Burns 20'	Report	Dunn 40'; Stewart 45'	Attendance: 5,360; Referee: Michael Bull

10 January 2015 25	Dagenham & Redbridge	0–0	Oxford United	Dagenham
15:00		Report		Stadium: Victoria Road; Attendance: 1,892; Referee: Darren Drysdale

17 January 2015 26	Oxford United	2–3	Southend United	Kassam Stadium
15:00	O'Dowda 13'; Long 45'	Report	Worrall 25'; Pigott 48'; Corr 82'	Attendance: 7,207; Referee: Michael Bull

24 January 2015 27	Oxford United	2–2	Exeter City	Kassam Stadium
15:00	Hylton 18'; Roberts 90'	Report	Davies 37'; Nicholls 88'	Attendance: 6,791; Referee: Graham Horwood

10 January 2015 28	Stevenage	0–2	Oxford United	Stevenage
15:00		Report	Mullins 59'; O'Dowda 68'	Stadium: Broadhall Way; Attendance: 3,146; Referee: Tim Robinson

7 February 2015 29	Oxford United	1–1	Luton Town	Kassam Stadium
15:00	Mullins 43'	Report	Stockley 36'	Attendance: 7,541; Referee: Richard Clark

10 February 2015 30	Accrington Stanley	1–0	Oxford United	Accrington
19:45	Gornell 90'	Report		Stadium: Crown Ground; Attendance: 1,065; Referee: Mark Haywood

14 February 2015 31	Burton Albion	2–0	Oxford United	Burton-on-Trent
15:00	McGurk 13'; Akins 89'	Report		Stadium: Pirelli Stadium; Attendance: 2,954; Referee: Peter Bankes

21 February 2015 32	Oxford United	3–0	Mansfield Town	Kassam Stadium
15:00 GMT	MacDonald 31' 54'; Hylton 63' (pen.)	Report		Attendance: 6,954; Referee: Andy Woolmer

28 February 2015 33	Portsmouth	0–0	Oxford United	Portsmouth
15:00		Report		Stadium: Fratton Park; Attendance: 16,355; Referee: Darren Deadman

3 March 2015 34	Oxford United	1–1	Morecambe	Kassam Stadium
19:45 GMT	Baldock 87'	Report	Ellison 11'	Attendance: 6,924; Referee: Fred Graham

7 March 2015 35	Bury	0–1	Oxford United	Bury
15:00		Report	O'Dowda 85'	Stadium: Gigg Lane; Attendance: 3,645; Referee: Kevin Johnson

14 March 2015 36	Oxford United	0–0	Plymouth Argyle	Kassam Stadium
15:00 GMT		Report		Attendance: 8,057; Referee: Michael Bull

17 March 2015 37	Oxford United	0–2	Hartlepool United	Kassam Stadium
19:45 GMT		Report	Bird 33'; Austin 51'	Attendance: 4,375; Referee: Pat Miller

21 March 2015 38	Shrewsbury Town	2–0	Oxford United	Shrewsbury
15:00	Lawrence 2' (pen.), 82'	Report		Stadium: New Meadow; Attendance: 5,265; Referee: Tony Harrington

28 March 2015 39	Oxford United	2–1	Carlisle United	Kassam Stadium
15:00 GMT	Hoban 38'; Vassell 80'	Report	Corry 9'	Attendance: 5,515; Referee: Gavin Ward

3 April 2015 40	Wycombe Wanderers	2–3	Oxford United	High Wycombe
15:00	Hayes 48'; Amadi-Holloway 88'	Report	Roofe 11', 60'; Rose 22'	Stadium: Adams Park; Attendance: 6,892; Referee: Oliver Langford

6 April 2015 41	Oxford United	0–0	York City	Kassam Stadium
15:00 GMT		Report		Attendance: 9,406; Referee: James Adcock

11 April 2015 42	AFC Wimbledon	0–0	Oxford United	Kingston upon Thames
15:00		Report		Stadium: Kingsmeadow; Attendance: 4,234; Referee: Lee Collins

14 April 2015 43	Oxford United	1–1	Northampton Town	Kassam Stadium
19:45 GMT	MacDonald 90'	Report	Toney 38'	Attendance: 4,836; Referee: Brendan Malone

18 April 2015 44	Tranmere Rovers	0–3	Oxford United	Tranmere
15:00		Report	Roofe 51', 59'; Rose 52'	Stadium: Prenton Park; Referee: Andy Madley

25 April 2015 45	Oxford United	2–0	Cambridge United	Kassam Stadium
15:00 GMT	Roofe 21'; Hylton 45'	Report		Attendance: 5,954; Referee: Carl Berry

2 May 2015 46	Newport County	0–1	Oxford United	Newport
15:00 GMT		Report	Roofe 30'	Stadium: Rodney Parade; Attendance: 4,295; Referee: Mark Heywood

==== Results summary ====
Overall								Home						Away					
Pld	W	D	L	GF	GA	GD	Pts	W	D	L	GF	GA	GD	W	D	L	GF	GA	GD
46	15	16	15	49	48	+1	61	7	9	7	26	23	+3	8	7	8	23	25	−2

Last updated: 2 May 2015.
Source: BBC Sport

==== Results by round ====
Round	1	2	3	4	5	6	7	8	9	10	11	12	13	14	15	16	17	18	19	20	21	22	23	24	25	26	27	28	29	30	31	32	33	34	35	36	37	38	39	40	41	42	43	44	45	46
Ground	H	A	A	H	H	A	A	H	H	A	H	A	H	A	A	H	A	H	A	H	A	H	A	H	A	H	H	A	H	A	A	H	A	H	A	H	H	A	H	A	H	A	H	A	H	A
Result	L	L	L	L	D	D	D	W	D	L	W	L	W	W	L	L	W	D	D	W	D	L	W	L	D	L	D	W	D	L	L	W	D	D	W	D	L	L	W	W	D	D	D	W	W	W
Position	21	20	21	24	23	23	22	22	22	23	20	23	20	19	19	19	18	19	19	17	17	17	16	16	15	17	16	15	15	17	19	17	17	19	18	17	19	19	16	15	16	16	16	15	14	13

Updated to match(es) played on 2 May 2015. Source: see below
A = Away; H = Home; W = Win; D = Draw; L = Loss

=== FA Cup ===
The draw for the first round of the FA Cup was made on 27 October 2014.

8 November 2014 1	Grimsby Town	1–3	Oxford United	Grimsby
15:00	Pearson 80'	Report	Roberts 35', 42'; Rose 51'	Stadium: Blundell Park; Attendance: 3,241; Referee: Chris Kavanagh

6 December 2014 2	Oxford United	2–2	Tranmere Rovers	Kassam Stadium
15:00	Barnett 59' 64'	Report	Stockton 33'; Koumas 76'	Attendance: 4,681; Referee: Mark Haywood

16 December 2014 2R	Tranmere Rovers	2–1	Oxford United	Tranmere
19:45	Odejayi 36'; Power 76'; Ihiekwe (yellow card) 80'	Report	Potter 29'; Collins (yellow card) 32'; Wright (yellow card) 62'; Hylton (yellow card) 83'	Stadium: Prenton Park; Attendance: 3,296; Referee: Mick Russell

=== League Cup ===
The draw for the first round was made on 17 June 2014 at 10am. Oxford United were drawn away to Bristol City.

12 August 2014 1	Bristol City	1–2	Oxford United	Bristol
19:45	Bryan 2'	Report	Morris 55'; Hylton 87'	Stadium: Ashton Gate; Attendance: 6,145; Referee: Lee Collins

26 August 2014 2	West Bromwich Albion	1–1 (a.e.t.) (7–6 p)	Oxford United	West Bromwich Albion
19:45	Mullins 29' (o.g.)	Report	Hylton 86'; Brown (yellow card) 52' (yellow-red card) 111'	Stadium: The Hawthorns; Attendance: 10,939; Referee: James Adcock
	Penalties
	Morrison (penalty missed); Ideye (penalty missed); Mulumbu (penalty scored); Berahino (penalty scored); Yacob (penalty scored); Dawson (penalty scored); Wisdom (penalty scored); Gamboa (penalty scored); Davidson (penalty scored)		Hylton (penalty scored); Collins (penalty missed); Newey (penalty missed); Hoskins (penalty scored); Hunt (penalty scored); Jakubiak (penalty scored); Ruffels (penalty scored); Mullins (penalty scored); Wright (penalty missed)

=== Football League Trophy ===
2 September 2014 1	Cheltenham Town	2–0	Oxford United	Cheltenham
19:45	Marquis 45+2'; Arthur 78'	Report	Meades (red card) 68'	Stadium: Whaddon Road; Attendance: 1,424 (261 away); Referee: Brendan Malone

== Squad statistics ==
=== Appearances and goals ===
As of 2 May 2015

No.	Pos	Nat	Player	Total		League Two		FA Cup		League Cup		JP Trophy	
No.	Pos	Nat	Player	Apps	Goals	Apps	Goals	Apps	Goals	Apps	Goals	Apps	Goals
1	GK	(England) ENG	Ryan Clarke	34	0	31	0	3	0	0	0	0	0
2	DF	(Wales) WAL	Jonathan Meades	10	0	5+2	0	0+1	0	1	0	1	0
3	DF	(England) ENG	Tom Newey	15	0	12	0	0	0	2	0	1	0
3	DF	(England) ENG	Joe Skarz	18	0	18	0	0	0	0	0	0	0
4	DF	(England) ENG	Michael Raynes	5	0	3+1	0	0	0	0	0	1	0
4	DF	(England) ENG	Richard Brindley	3	0	3	0	0	0	0	0	0	0
5	DF	(England) ENG	Johnny Mullins	49	2	42+2	2	3	0	2	0	0	0
6	DF	(England) ENG	Jake Wright	48	0	42	0	3	0	2	0	1	0
7	MF	(England) ENG	Danny Rose	34	3	25+4	2	3	1	1	0	0+1	0
8	MF	(England) ENG	Junior Brown	15	0	6+5	0	0+1	0	2	0	1	0
9	FW	(England) ENG	Carlton Morris	9	1	5+2	0	0	0	1	1	0+1	0
10	FW	(England) ENG	Danny Hylton	49	16	41+3	14	2	0	1+1	2	1	0
11	MF	(England) ENG	Alfie Potter	18	3	9+4	2	2+1	1	1	0	1	0
11	MF	(Scotland) SCO	Alex MacDonald	14	3	13+1	3	0	0	0	0	0	0
12	DF	(England) ENG	George Baldock	12	1	12	1	0	0	0	0	0	0
13	DF	(England) ENG	David Hunt	5	0	2+1	0	0	0	1+1	0	0	0
14	MF	(England) ENG	Josh Ruffels	38	0	30+4	0	1	0	2	0	1	0
15	FW	(Republic of Ireland) IRL	Callum O'Dowda	42	4	21+18	4	3	0	0	0	0	0
16	DF	(England) ENG	Andy Whing	23	0	18+3	0	2	0	0	0	0	0
17	DF	(England) ENG	Matt Bevans	0	0	0	0	0	0	0	0	0	0
18	GK	(England) ENG	George Long	11	0	10	0	0	0	0	0	1	0
18	GK	(England) ENG	Jamie Ashdown	5	0	5	0	0	0	0	0	0	0
19	MF	(Ireland) EIR	Michael Collins	43	2	38+1	2	2	0	1+1	0	0	0
20	FW	(England) ENG	Giorgio Rasulo	1	0	0+1	0	0	0	0	0	0	0
21	GK	(New Zealand) NZL	Max Crocombe	2	0	0	0	0	0	2	0	0	0
22	MF	(England) ENG	Sam Long	10	1	8+2	1	0	0	0	0	0	0
23	FW	(England) ENG	Josh Shama	0	0	0	0	0	0	0	0	0	0
24	MF	(England) ENG	Josh Ashby	2	0	2	0	0	0	0	0	0	0
25	DF	(England) ENG	Joe Riley	28	0	22	0	3	0	2	0	1	0
25	FW	(Ivory Coast) CIV	Armand Gnanduillet	4	0	0+4	0	0	0	0	0	0	0
26	FW	(Wales) WAL	Wes Burns	8	1	6+2	1	0	0	0	0	0	0
27	FW	(England) ENG	Tyrone Barnett	14	6	11+1	4	1+1	2	0	0	0	0
27	FW	(England) ENG	Kyle Vassell	6	1	2+4	1	0	0	0	0	0	0
28	FW	(England) ENG	Alex Jakubiak	10	1	2+7	1	0	0	0+1	0	0	0
29	MF	(England) ENG	Brian Howard	8	0	7	0	1	0	0	0	0	0
29	MF	(England) ENG	Kemar Roofe	16	6	12+4	6	0	0	0	0	0	0
30	MF	(England) ENG	Sam Humphreys	1	0	0+1	0	0	0	0	0	0	0
31	FW	(England) ENG	James Roberts	25	5	5+19	3	1	2	0	0	0	0
32	MF	(England) ENG	Aidan Hawtin	1	0	0+1	0	0	0	0	0	0	0
33	DF	(England) ENG	Chey Dunkley	9	0	7+2	0	0	0	0	0	0	0
34	DF	(England) ENG	Tareiq Holmes-Dennis	17	0	14	0	3	0	0	0	0	0
36	FW	(England) ENG	John Campbell	3	1	1+2	1	0	0	0	0	0	0
39	FW	(Ireland) EIR	Patrick Hoban	20	1	15+5	1	0	0	0	0	0	0
44	FW	(England) ENG	Will Hoskins	6	0	2+2	0	0	0	0+1	0	1	0

=== Top scorers ===
As of 2 May 2015

Place	Position	Nation	Number	Name	League Two	FA Cup	League Cup	JP Trophy	Total
1	FW	(England)	10	Danny Hylton	14	0	2	0	16
2	FW	(England)	27	Tyrone Barnett	4	2	0	0	6
2	MF	(England)	29	Kemar Roofe	6	0	0	0	6
4	FW	(England)	31	James Roberts	3	2	0	0	5
5	FW	(England)	15	Callum O'Dowda	4	0	0	0	4
6	MF	(England)	11	Alfie Potter	2	1	0	0	3
6	MF	(Scotland)	11	Alex MacDonald	3	0	0	0	3
6	MF	(England)	7	Danny Rose	2	1	0	0	3
9	MF	(Republic of Ireland)	19	Michael Collins	2	0	0	0	2
9	DF	(England)	5	Johnny Mullins	2	0	0	0	2
11	DF	(England)	12	George Baldock	1	0	0	0	1
11	FW	(Wales)	26	Wes Burns	1	0	0	0	1
11	FW	(England)	36	John Campbell	1	0	0	0	1
11	FW	(Republic of Ireland)	9	Patrick Hoban	1	0	0	0	1
11	FW	(England)	28	Alex Jakubiak	1	0	0	0	1
11	FW	(England)	22	Sam Long	1	0	0	0	1
11	FW	(England)	9	Carlton Morris	0	0	1	0	1
11	FW	(England)	27	Kyle Vassell	1	0	0	0	1
11	Own goals				1	0	0	0	1
TOTALS					50	6	3	0	59

=== Disciplinary record ===
As of 2 May 2015

Number	Nation	Position	Name	League Two		FA Cup		League Cup		JP Trophy		Total	
Number	Nation	Position	Name	Booked	Sent off (straight red)	Booked	Sent off (straight red)	Booked	Sent off (straight red)	Booked	Sent off (straight red)	Booked	Sent off (straight red)
1	(England)	GK	Ryan Clarke	1	0	0	0	0	0	0	0	1	0
2	(Wales)	DF	Jonathan Meades	0	0	0	0	0	0	0	1	0	1
3	(England)	DF	Joe Skarz	3	0	0	0	0	0	0	0	3	0
5	(England)	DF	Johnny Mullins	3	0	0	0	0	0	0	0	3	0
6	(England)	DF	Jake Wright	4	0	1	0	2	0	0	0	7	0
7	(England)	MF	Danny Rose	3	0	0	0	0	0	0	0	3	0
8	(England)	MF	Junior Brown	0	0	0	0	0	1	0	0	0	1
9	(England)	FW	Carlton Morris	1	0	0	0	0	0	0	0	1	0
10	(England)	FW	Danny Hylton	9	0	1	0	0	0	1	0	11	0
11	(Scotland)	MF	Alex MacDonald	3	0	0	0	0	0	0	0	3	0
12	(England)	DF	George Baldock	6	0	0	0	0	0	0	0	6	0
14	(England)	MF	Josh Ruffels	1	0	0	0	0	0	0	0	1	0
16	(England)	DF	Andy Whing	5	0	0	0	0	0	0	0	5	0
18	(England)	GK	George Long	1	0	0	0	0	0	0	0	1	0
19	(Republic of Ireland)	MF	Michael Collins	5	0	1	0	0	0	0	0	6	0
21	(New Zealand)	GK	Max Crocombe	0	0	0	0	1	0	0	0	1	0
22	(England)	MF	Sam Long	2	0	0	0	0	0	0	0	2	0
25	(England)	DF	Joe Riley	4	0	0	0	0	0	0	0	4	0
25	(Ivory Coast)	FW	Armand Gnanduillet	1	0	0	0	0	0	0	0	1	0
27	(England)	FW	Tyrone Barnett	2	1	0	0	0	0	0	0	2	1
29	(England)	MF	Brian Howard	1	0	0	0	0	0	0	0	1	0
29	(England)	MF	Kemar Roofe	2	0	0	0	0	0	0	0	2	0
39	(Republic of Ireland)	FW	Patrick Hoban	2	0	0	0	0	0	0	0	2	0
44	(England)	FW	Will Hoskins	2	0	0	0	0	0	0	0	2	0
TOTALS				57	1	3	0	3	1	1	1	63	3

== Transfers ==
Players transferred in
Date	Pos.	Name	From	Fee	Ref.
6 June 2014	FW	(England) Danny Hylton	(England) Rotherham United	Free	
15 July 2014	MF	(Republic of Ireland) Michael Collins	(England) Scunthorpe United	Free	
31 July 2014	MF	(England) Junior Brown	(England) Fleetwood Town	Free	
25 August 2014	FW	(England) Will Hoskins	(England) Brighton & Hove Albion	Free	
15 September 2014	MF	(England) Brian Howard	(England) Birmingham City	Free	
21 November 2014 (Note: Hoban agreed to join Oxford United on 21 November 2014, and officially joined the club on 1 January 2015.)	FW	(Republic of Ireland) Patrick Hoban	(Republic of Ireland) Dundalk	Undisclosed	
27 November 2014	FW	(England) John Campbell	(England) Jarrow Roofing Boldon Community Association	Undisclosed	
24 January 2015	DF	(England) Joe Skarz	(England) Rotherham United	Free	
2 February 2015	MF	(Scotland) Alex MacDonald	(England) Burton Albion	Undisclosed	
3 February 2015	GK	(England) Jamie Ashdown	(England) Crawley Town	Free	
9 February 2015	FW	(France) Jeremy Balmy	(England) Notts County	Free	
Players transferred out
Date	Pos.	Name	To	Fee	Ref.
8 May 2014	MF	(England) Scott Davies	(England) Dunstable Town	Free	
8 May 2014	MF	(England) Sean Rigg	(England) AFC Wimbledon	Free	
20 May 2014	FW	(England) Deane Smalley	(England) Plymouth Argyle	Free	
21 May 2014	FW	(England) James Constable	(England) Eastleigh	Free	
24 December 2014	FW	(England) Tyrone Marsh	(England) Ebbsfleet United	Free	
7 January 2015	MF	(England) Junior Brown	(England) Mansfield Town	Free	
9 January 2015	DF	(England) Michael Raynes	(England) Mansfield Town	Free	
16 January 2015	MF	(England) Alfie Potter	(England) AFC Wimbledon	Free	
27 January 2015	DF	(England) Tom Newey	(England) Northampton Town	Free	
Players loaned in
Date from	Pos.	Name	From	Date to	Ref.
25 July 2014	GK	(England) George Long	(England) Sheffield United	January 2015	
28 July 2014	DF	(England) Joe Riley	(England) Bolton Wanderers	1 January 2015	
4 August 2014	FW	(England) Carlton Morris	(England) Norwich City	23 October 2014	
13 August 2014	FW	(England) Alex Jakubiak	(England) Watford	4 November 2014	
10 September 2014	FW	(England) Tyrone Barnett	(England) Peterborough United	12 December 2014	
16 October 2014	DF	(England) Tareiq Holmes-Dennis	(England) Charlton Athletic	2 February 2015	
20 November 2014	DF	(England) Chey Dunkley	(England) Kidderminster Harriers	1 January 2015	
27 November 2014	FW	(Wales) Wes Burns	(England) Bristol City	2 February 2015	
29 January 2015	DF	(England) Richard Brindley	(England) Rotherham United	29 February 2015	
12 February 2015	DF	(England) George Baldock	(England) Milton Keynes Dons	30 June 2015	
13 February 2015	MF	(England) Kemar Roofe	(England) West Bromwich Albion	30 June 2015	
19 February 2015	FW	(England) Giorgio Rasulo	(England) Milton Keynes Dons	26 March 2015	
2 March 2015	FW	(Ivory Coast) Armand Gnanduillet	(England) Chesterfield	26 March 2015	
26 March 2015	FW	(England) Kyle Vassell	(England) Peterborough United	30 June 2015	
Players loaned out
Date from	Pos.	Name	To	Date to	Ref.
5 August 2014	FW	(England) Tyrone Marsh	(England) Welling United	24 December 2014	
29 August 2014	FW	(England) Josh Shama	(England) Banbury United	26 September 2014	
29 August 2014	DF	(England) Matt Bevans	(England) Farnborough	26 September 2014	
29 August 2014	MF	(England) Aidan Hawtin	(England) Banbury United	26 September 2014	
30 October 2014	DF	(England) Tom Newey	(England) Northampton Town	2 January 2015	
31 October 2014	DF	(England) David Hunt	(England) Barnet	end-January 2015	
20 November 2014	MF	(England) Sam Long	(England) Kidderminster Harriers	1 January 2015	
27 November 2014	MF	(England) Junior Brown	(England) Mansfield Town	3 January 2015	
17 February 2015	FW	(England) John Campbell	(England) Torquay United	30 June 2015	
20 February 2015	GK	(New Zealand) Max Crocombe	(England) Nuneaton Town	30 June 2015	
13 March 2015	FW	(England) Josh Shama	(England) Farnborough Town	30 June 2015	
13 March 2015	FW	(France) Jeremy Balmy	(England) Oxford City	30 June 2015	
