= Canice Carroll =

Footballer (born 1999)

Personal information
- Full name: Canice Michael Carroll
- Date of birth: 26 January 1999 (age 27)
- Place of birth: Oxford, England
- Height: 1.87 m (6 ft 2 in)
- Positions: Midfielder; defender

Team information
- Current team: Oxford City
- Number: 25

Youth career
- 2006–2015: Oxford United

Senior career*
Years	Team	Apps	(Gls)
2015–2018	Oxford United	16	(1)
2018–2020	Brentford	0	(0)
2019	→ Swindon Town (loan)	17	(1)
2019–2020	→ Carlisle United (loan)	9	(0)
2020	Stevenage	4	(0)
2020–2021	Queen's Park	11	(0)
2021–2024	Oxford City	99	(5)
2024–2025	Salisbury	13	(0)
2025	Oxford City	11	(0)
2025–2026	Chippenham Town	19	(2)
2026–	Oxford City	7	(1)

International career
2015–2016	Republic of Ireland U17	5	(0)
2016	Republic of Ireland U18	4	(0)
2016–2018	Republic of Ireland U19	11	(0)
2019	Republic of Ireland U21	1	(0)
- * Club domestic league appearances and goals as of 07:48, 27 August 2026 (UTC)

Canice Michael Carroll (born 16 January 1999) is a professional footballer who plays as a defender for National League North club Oxford City.

Carroll is a product of the Oxford United youth system and began his professional career with the club, before moving to Brentford in 2018. After loan spells at Swindon Town and Carlisle United and a short period with Stevenage, he moved to Scotland to join Queen's Park in 2020. In 2021, Carroll moved into non-League football. Born in England, Carroll was capped by the Republic of Ireland at youth level.

== Club career ==
=== Oxford United ===
Adept as a central defender, full back or a midfielder, Carroll came through the youth system at hometown club Oxford United and began a scholarship in July 2015. His progression was such that he was offered a 2 1/2-year professional contract in August 2015 and signed it on 5 February 2016. Carroll made his debut for the club as a substitute for Alex MacDonald after 82 minutes of a 2–0 Football League Trophy Southern Area quarter-final victory over Dagenham & Redbridge on 11 November 2015. He did not feature in the remainder of Oxford's run to the 2016 Football League Trophy Final or in the club's promotion to League One, but was a part of the U18 team which finished the season as Football League Youth Alliance Merit League 2 champions.

Carroll made seven appearances during the 2016–17 season and was named as the Us' Young Player of the Year. He was an unused substitute during the 2–1 2017 EFL Trophy Final defeat to Coventry City at Wembley Stadium. Carroll signed a new three-year contract with the club in May 2017.

Carroll made something of a breakthrough during the 2017–18 season, making 17 appearances and scoring his only goal for the club, with a header in a 3–2 defeat to Bradford City on 30 December 2017. He departed the Us on 9 August 2018, having made 25 appearances and scored one goal during 2 1/2 seasons as a professional at the Kassam Stadium.

=== Brentford ===
On 9 August 2018, Carroll signed a two-year contract with the B team at Championship club Brentford for an undisclosed fee, with the option of a further year. He featured regularly for the B team and was an unused substitute on one occasion for the first team before joining League Two club Swindon Town on loan until the end of the 2018–19 season in January 2019. Deployed predominantly as a defensive midfielder, Carroll made 17 appearances and scored one goal during his spell. Carroll later stated that turning down transferring to Swindon Town permanently "was probably one of the very few regrets that I have".

Despite being a member of the Brentford first team's Austrian training camp during the 2019–20 pre-season, Carroll joined League Two club Carlisle United on loan for the duration of the 2019–20 season. On 10 August 2019, his second match for the club, Carroll received the first red card of his career, for a "two-footed lunge" on Jordan Lyden during a 3–2 defeat to former club Swindon Town. The loan was ended on 31 January 2020, by which time he had made 16 appearances and scored one goal. Later that day, Carroll transferred away from Brentford.

=== Stevenage ===
On 31 January 2020, Carroll transferred to League Two club Stevenage on a contract running until the end of the 2019–20 season. Prior to the season being ended early, he made four appearances and was released when his contract expired.

=== Queen's Park ===
On 2 November 2020, Carroll signed a contract running until the end of the 2020–21 season with Scottish League Two club Queen's Park. He made his debut later that day in a 0–0 Glasgow Cup group stage draw with Rangers B. Carroll made 14 appearances during the remainder of the Spiders' Scottish League Two championship-winning season and was released when his contract expired.

=== Non-League football ===
On 4 August 2021, Carroll signed a one-year contract with National League South club Oxford City. He made 28 appearances and scored two goals during a 2021–22 season which concluded with defeat in the National League South playoff semi-finals. Carroll signed a new one-year contract in June 2022. He made 52 appearances in all competitions, scoring three goals, during the 2022–23 promotion-winning season. Carroll signed a new one-year contract in June 2023 and made 33 appearances during a 2023–24 season which concluded with immediate relegation back to the Conference South. Carroll ended his three-season spell on 113 appearances and seven goals.

On 26 October 2024, Carroll joined National League South club Salisbury as a free agent. After making 16 appearances, he signed a short-term contract with Oxford City on 17 February 2025. Carroll made 11 appearances during the remainder of the 2024–25 season and was released when his contract expired. On 23 June 2025, Carroll transferred to National League South club Chippenham Town. He made 20 appearances and two goals prior to the termination of his contract by mutual consent on 26 March 2026. The following day, Carroll made a second return to Oxford City. He made six appearances and scored one goal during the remainder of the 2025–26 season and was retained for 2026–27.

== International career ==
Carroll has been capped by the Republic of Ireland at U17, U18 and U19 level. He was nominated for the International U17 Player of the Year award at the 2016 FAI International Football Awards. Carroll was named in the U21 squad for the 2019 Toulon Tournament and made one appearance in the tournament, with a start in a shootout defeat to Mexico U22 in the third place play-off.

== Personal life ==
Carroll attended Cherwell School.

== Career statistics ==
As of match played 8 August 2026

Appearances and goals by club, season and competition
Club	Season	League			National cup (Note: Includes FA Cup, Scottish Cup)		League cup (Note: Includes EFL Cup, Scottish League Cup)		Other		Total	
Club	Season	Division	Apps	Goals	Apps	Goals	Apps	Goals	Apps	Goals	Apps	Goals
Oxford United	2015–16	League Two	0	0	0	0	0	0	1 (Note: Appearance(s) in EFL Trophy)	0	1	0
Oxford United	2016–17	League One	4	0	1	0	0	0	2	0	7	0
Oxford United	2017–18	League One	12	1	0	0	1	0	4	0	17	1
Oxford United	Total		16	1	1	0	1	0	7	0	25	1
Brentford	2018–19	Championship	0	0	—		0	0	—		0	0
Swindon Town (loan)	2018–19	League Two	17	1	—		—		—		17	1
Carlisle United (loan)	2019–20	League Two	9	0	3	0	1	0	3	1	16	1
Stevenage	2019–20	League Two	4	0	—		—		—		4	0
Queen's Park	2020–21	Scottish League Two	11	0	1	0	2	0	1 (Note: Appearance in 2019–20 Glasgow Cup)	0	14	0
Oxford City	2021–22	National League South	25	2	0	0	—		3 (Note: Two appearances in National League South play-offs, one appearance in Oxfordshire Senior Cup)	0	28	2
Oxford City	2022–23	National League South	44	2	5	1	—		3 (Note: Two appearances in National League South play-offs, one appearance in FA Trophy)	0	52	3
Oxford City	2023–24	National League	30	1	2	1	—		1 (Note: Appearance in FA Trophy)	0	33	2
Oxford City	Total		99	5	7	2	—		7	0	113	7
Salisbury	2024–25	National League South	13	0	—		—		4 (Note: Two appearances in FA Trophy, two appearances in Wiltshire Premier Shield)	0	17	0
Oxford City	2024–25	National League North	11	0	—		—		—		11	0
Chippenham Town	2025–26	National League South	19	2	1	0	—		0	0	20	2
Oxford City	2025–26	National League North	6	1	—		—		—		6	1
Oxford City	2026–27	National League North	1	0	0	0	—		0	0	1	0
Oxford City	Total		7	1	0	0	—		0	0	7	1
Career total			206	10	13	2	4	0	22	1	245	13

== Honours ==
Oxford United

- EFL Trophy runner-up: 2016–17

Queen's Park

- Scottish League Two: 2020–21

Oxford City

- National League South play-offs: 2023
- Oxfordshire Senior Cup: 2021–22

Individual

- Oxford United Young Player of the Year: 2016–17
