= James Roberts (footballer, born 1996) =

Footballer (born 1996)

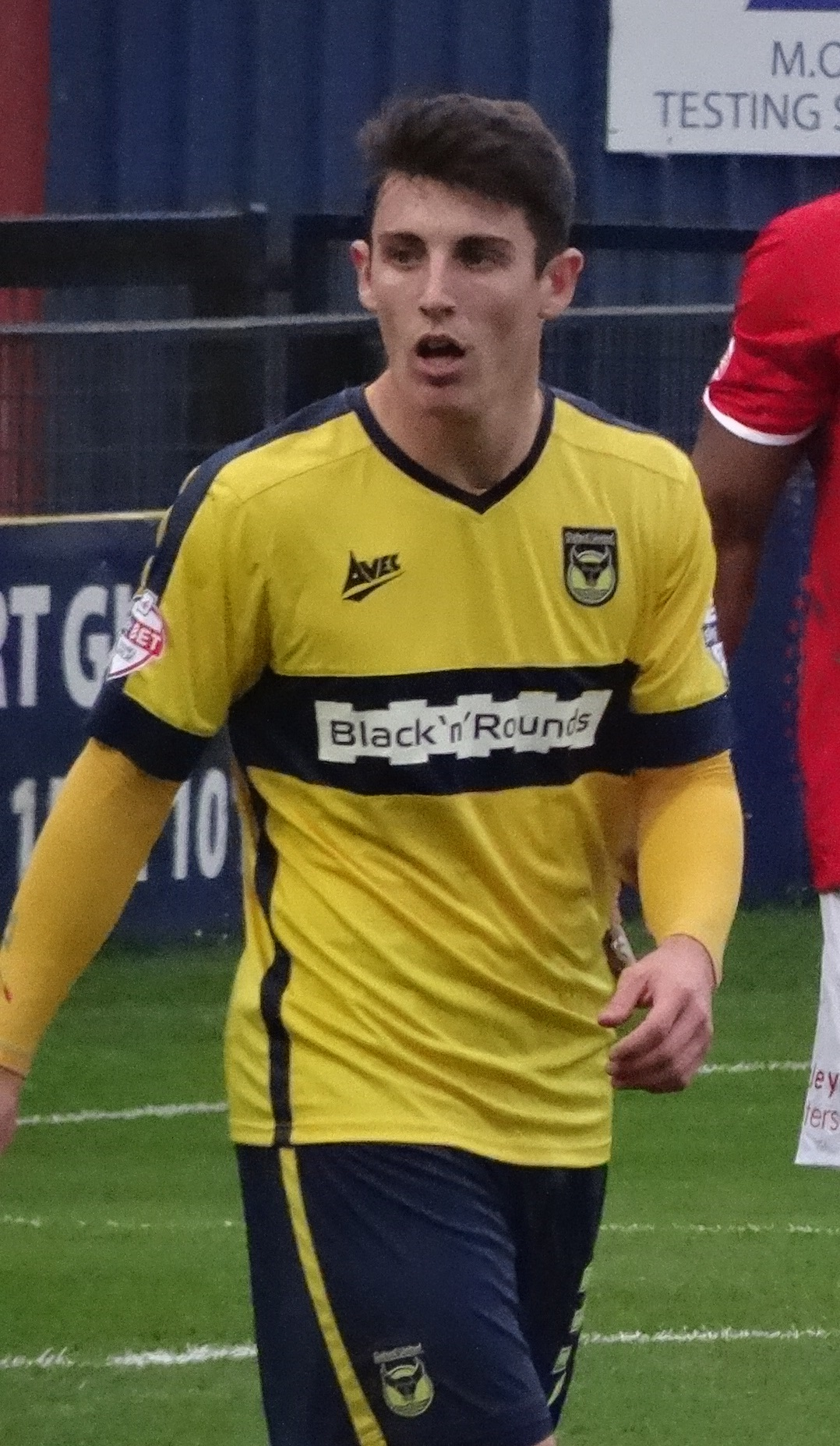
- Roberts playing for Oxford United in 2014

Personal information
- Full name: James Anthony Roberts
- Date of birth: 21 June 1996 (age 30)
- Place of birth: Stoke Mandeville, England
- Position: Forward

Team information
- Current team: Westfield

Youth career
- –2012: Wycombe Wanderers
- 2012–2014: Oxford United

Senior career*
Years	Team	Apps	(Gls)
2014–2018	Oxford United	30	(3)
2015	→ Chester (loan)	6	(1)
2016	→ Oxford City (loan)	4	(0)
2016	→ Barnet (loan)	2	(0)
2016–2017	→ Oxford City (loan)	15	(2)
2017	→ Stalybridge Celtic (loan)	14	(1)
2017–2018	→ Guiseley (loan)	18	(3)
2018	Halesowen Town	10	(6)
2018–2019	Hereford	19	(5)
2019	→ Alvechurch (loan)	7	(5)
2019–2020	Spennymoor Town	32	(10)
2020–2021	Oxford City	15	(11)
2021–2024	Havant & Waterlooville	120	(26)
2022	→ Hampton & Richmond Borough (loan)	5	(2)
2024–2025	Hampton & Richmond Borough	36	(11)
2025–2026	Horsham	21	(1)
2026	Sholing	18	(3)
2026–	Westfield	14	(5)
- * Club domestic league appearances and goals as of 19:33, 4 November 2026 (UTC)

James Anthony Roberts (born 21 June 1996) is an English professional footballer who plays as a forward for Isthmian League South Central Division club Westfield.

== Career ==
Roberts made his first team debut for Oxford United as a substitute in a 5–1 away defeat on 11 October 2014 against Cambridge United at Abbey Stadium. He made his first senior start, and scored his first two goals, in a first-round FA Cup win over Grimsby Town on 8 November 2014. He was rewarded with his first league start the following week at York City, where his debut league goal won the game for Oxford. He scored 5 goals in total in his inaugural season but, after not featuring in the opening 10 games of the following season, was loaned to Chester for a month on 29 September 2015. Roberts joined Oxford City on loan in January 2016, and then Barnet the following month. He joined Oxford City on loan for a second time in September 2016, then was loaned to Stalybridge Celtic from February 2017 for the rest of the season. The following season he joined Guiseley on a month's loan in December 2017, later extended until the end of the 2017–18 season. At the end of the season, he was released by Oxford.

After a short spell with Halesowen Town, Roberts joined Hereford on 24 October 2018. On 28 March 2019, he was loaned out to Alvechurch until the end of the season.

Having been released by Hereford, on 17 June 2019 Roberts joined Spennymoor Town. The following season, he joined Oxford City. After a prolific season, he joined divisional rivals Havant & Waterlooville for an undisclosed fee.

In June 2024, Roberts returned to Hampton & Richmond Borough on a permanent basis having enjoyed a short loan spell with the club two years earlier. Having scored four goals in three league matches, he was named National League Player of the Month for September 2024.

On 27 June 2025, Roberts joined newly promoted National League South side Horsham. On 16 August 2025, he scored his first (and only) league goal for the club in a 4–3 loss to Worthing. On 3 January 2026, Roberts left Horsham by mutual consent, having scored 4 goals in 28 appearances in all competitions.

On 22 July 2026, following his spell with Sholing, Roberts joined Isthmian League South Central Division club Westfield.

== Career statistics ==
As of matches played 31 October 2026

Appearances and goals by club, season and competition
Club	Season	League			FA Cup		League Cup		Other		Total	
Club	Season	Division	Apps	Goals	Apps	Goals	Apps	Goals	Apps	Goals	Apps	Goals
Oxford United	2014–15	League Two	25	3	1	2	0	0	0	0	26	5
Oxford United	2015–16	League Two	4	0	0	0	0	0	0	0	4	0
Oxford United	2016–17	League One	0	0	0	0	0	0	1 (Note: Appearance(s) in EFL Trophy)	0	1	0
Oxford United	2017–18	League One	1	0	0	0	0	0	2	0	3	0
Oxford United	Total		30	3	1	2	0	0	3	0	34	5
Chester (loan)	2015–16	National League	6	1	—		—		0	0	6	1
Oxford City (loan)	2015–16	National League South	4	0	—		—		1	0	5	0
Barnet (loan)	2015–16	League Two	2	0	—		—		0	0	2	0
Oxford City (loan)	2016–17	National League South	15	2	—		—		0	0	15	2
Stalybridge Celtic (loan)	2016–17	National League North	14	1	—		—		0	0	14	1
Guiseley (loan)	2017–18	National League	18	3	—		—		1	0	19	3
Halesowen Town	2018–19	Southern Premier Central	10	6	—		—		0	0	10	6
Hereford	2018–19	National League North	19	5	—		—		2	0	21	5
Alvechurch (loan)	2018–19	Southern Premier Central	7	5	—		—		2 (Note: Appearances in Southern League play-offs)	1	9	6
Spennymoor Town	2019–20	National League North	32	10	3	1	—		1 (Note: Appearance(s) in FA Trophy)	0	36	11
Oxford City	2020–21	National League South	15	11	5	4	—		3	1	23	16
Havant & Waterlooville	2021–22	National League South	32	5	5	3	—		1	0	38	8
Havant & Waterlooville	2022–23	National League South	45	14	3	0	—		1	0	49	14
Havant & Waterlooville	2023–24	National League South	43	7	0	0	—		1	0	44	7
Havant & Waterlooville	Total		120	26	8	3	—		3	0	131	29
Hampton & Richmond Borough (loan)	2021–22	National League South	5	2	—		—		—		5	2
Hampton & Richmond Borough	2024–25	National League South	36	11	1	1	—		3	1	40	13
Horsham	2025–26	National League South	21	1	3	1	—		1	0	25	2
Sholing	2025–26	Southern Premier South	18	3	—		—		—		18	3
Westfield	2026–27	Isthmian South Central	14	5	4	1	—		1	0	19	6
Career total			386	95	25	13	0	0	21	3	432	111

== Honours ==
Individual

- National League Player of the Month: September 2024

=== Horsham ===
- Sussex Community Shield: 2025
- Isthmian League Community Shield: 2025
