= Christian Ribeiro =

Welsh footballer

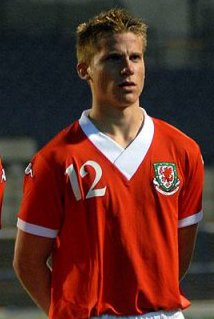
- Ribeiro with Wales U21 in 2008

Personal information
- Full name: Christian Michael Ribeiro
- Date of birth: 14 December 1989 (age 36)
- Place of birth: Neath, Wales
- Position: Defender

Youth career
- 2001–2006: Bristol City

Senior career*
Years	Team	Apps	(Gls)
2006–2012	Bristol City	14	(0)
2009	→ Stockport County (loan)	7	(0)
2010	→ Colchester United (loan)	2	(0)
2011–2012	→ Carlisle United (loan)	5	(0)
2012	→ Scunthorpe United (loan)	10	(0)
2012–2014	Scunthorpe United	49	(2)
2014–2016	Exeter City	72	(6)
2016–2017	Oxford United	13	(1)
Total		172	(9)

International career
2005–2006	Wales U17	7	(1)
2006–2007	Wales U19	5	(0)
2007–2011	Wales U21	8	(1)
2010	Wales	2	(0)
- * Club domestic league appearances and goals

Christian Michael Ribeiro (born 14 December 1989) is a Welsh retired professional footballer who played as a defender.

He began his career at Bristol City, and turned down a move to Everton in order to make his professional debut for the club in 2008, suffering an injury in the first half that ruled him out for 11 months. He had loans at Stockport County, Colchester United, Carlisle United and Scunthorpe United before moving permanently to the latter in 2012. In his two seasons as a Scunthorpe player, the team were relegated from, and promoted back to, League One. He then represented Exeter City, and two years later moved to Oxford United. He retired in November 2017 due to a knee injury.

Born in Wales and raised in England, Ribeiro won 20 caps and scored two goals for his country at youth level. In 2010, he played twice for the Welsh senior team.

== Early life ==
Ribeiro was born in Neath in South Wales, and at the age of 6 moved to Berkeley, Gloucestershire, and then onto Ruscombe near Stroud in his teenage years. He attended Marling School. His father coached his youth team Wanswell Wanderers. Ribeiro's surname comes from his paternal Portuguese heritage.

== Club career ==
=== Bristol City ===
Ribeiro came through the youth system at Bristol City before earning his first professional contract, lasting two and a half years, with the club in December 2006. His first team debut came nearly two years later in a 2–1 win over Peterborough United in the Football League Cup first round on 12 August 2008, but he was replaced after just 34 minutes after damaging his anterior cruciate ligament; the game at Ashton Gate finished 2–1 to City. The injury kept him out until next July.

Prior to his injury, he was linked with a move to Premier League side Everton, whose manager David Moyes was to offer £750,000 for his signature. Ribeiro quickly dismissed the approach by stating: "I felt I had a better chance of playing at Bristol City and I was proved right because I got into the first team, it just so happened that was when I got injured." He reflected in 2011 "I can see friends playing in the Premier League and the Championship week-in, week-out, and if only I hadn't had those injuries then I might be doing the same. But you can't go back. I'm very driven and ambitious and if I want to get there I just have to give 100 per cent in everything and show people what I can do".

Having made just one appearance during the 2009–10 season due to another injury sustained while international duty, Ribeiro was allowed to join Football League One side Stockport County on a one-month loan deal with a 24-hour recall clause. He made his Football League and Stockport debut in a 3–1 home defeat to Exeter City later that day. After a month, he decided to extend his loan period to 9 January 2010. However, at the end of December, manager Gary Johnson opted to exercise the recall clause following an injury and suspension crisis that saw Lewin Nyatanga, Jamie McCombe and Brian Wilson unavailable.

The following January, he went on loan again in League One, to Colchester United, until a groin injury ended his spell. Ribeiro made his league debut for Bristol City in a 2–2 home draw with Newcastle United on 20 March 2010.

On 2 November 2011, Ribeiro was loaned to Carlisle United of League One for the remainder of the calendar year, as a replacement for the injured Frank Simek and James Tavernier who was to return to Newcastle United. In May 2012, Ribeiro was released by Bristol City after learning that his contract would not be renewed.

=== Scunthorpe United ===
On 11 January 2012, Ribeiro was loaned to Scunthorpe United for two months. Following on from his 10-game loan deal, he signed a two-year contract with the option of a third on 9 July 2012, joining at the same time as Mike Grella.

He scored the first goal of his professional career on 17 November, opening a 2–2 draw against Notts County at Glanford Park, curling the ball after a one-two with Mark Duffy. Ribeiro's only other goal for Scunthorpe came on 15 December in a 3–1 win at Leyton Orient, again scoring the first goal of the game and again assisted by Duffy.

The club announced on 8 May 2014 that he would be released at the end of the season, despite playing 21 games as they won promotion back to League One.

=== Exeter City ===
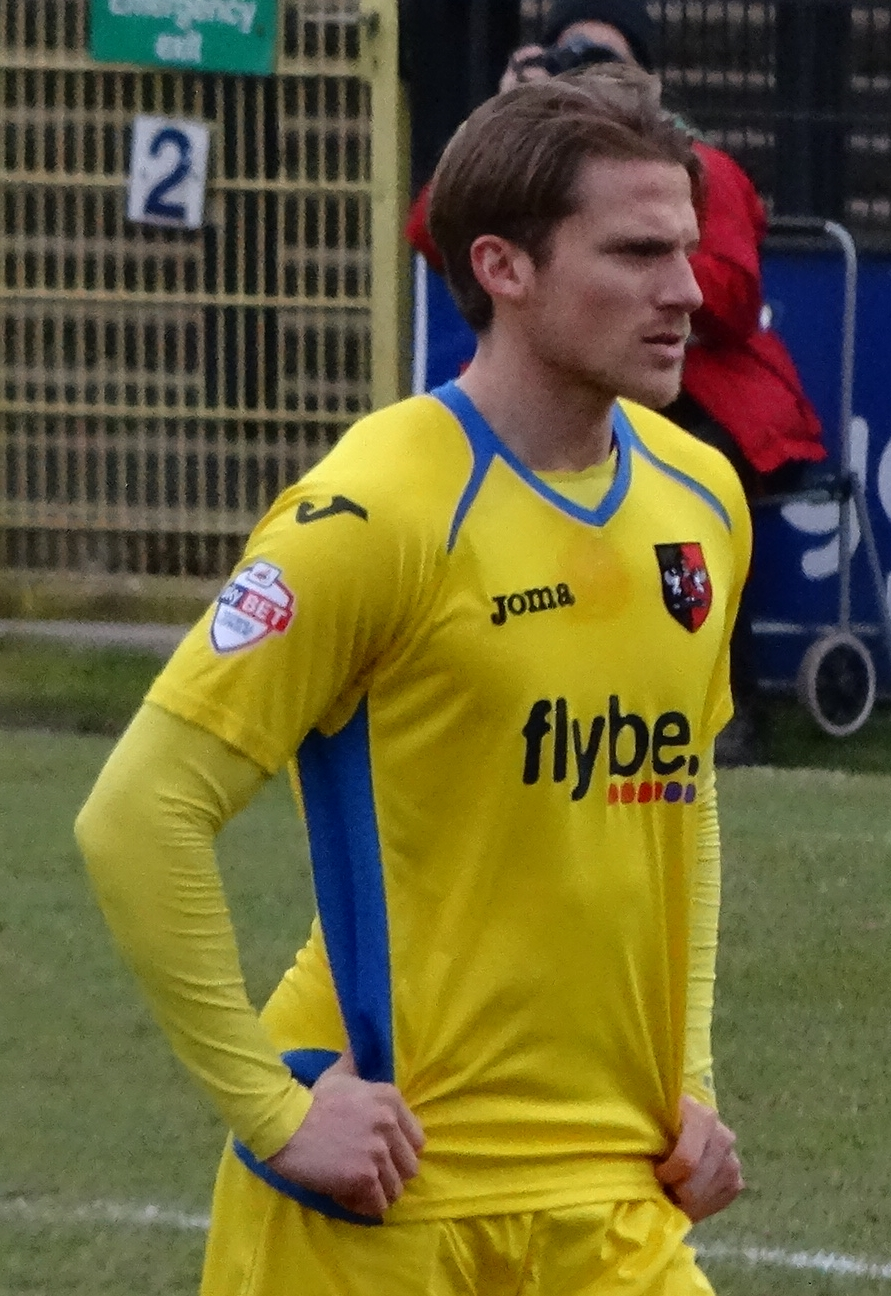
Ribeiro playing for Exeter City in 2015

On 21 August 2014, Ribeiro signed for League Two side Exeter City after a successful pre-season trial. The club were under a transfer embargo due to financial issues and Ribeiro was carrying an injury which was likely to remain until September.

He made his debut for the club on 6 September, starting in a 1–2 home defeat to Mansfield Town at St James Park. On 11 October he scored his first goal for Exeter, a headed consolation in another home loss by the same score against Hartlepool United; a second came on 6 December as a late equaliser for a 1–1 draw against Burton Albion.

On 14 June 2015, Ribeiro signed a new contract with Exeter, despite reported interest from Championship side Birmingham City and League One sides Swindon Town and Shrewsbury Town. He scored a career-best four goals in 35 games over the campaign, including late winners in home games against Hartlepool United on 12 September, and Accrington Stanley on 23 January. His contract expired in May 2016, and he was not offered a new one.

=== Oxford United ===
Ribeiro signed for newly promoted League One side Oxford United on 28 June 2016, on a two-year deal. He suffered a fractured ankle in pre-season training in August 2016 and was sidelined for most of the 2016–17 season. He made his belated debut against Bradford City on 14 April 2017, with only four games remaining in the season. He played 14 times in 2017–18 (10 in the league), scoring once, before a knee injury forced him to retire in November 2017, at the age of 27.

== International career ==
I knew years ago these guys were a golden generation and that when they were in their mid-20s they would get to the finals of a major tournament and they could go even further so it doesn't surprise me at all. I've had to tackle a few of those guys so it's a bit surreal and you think, 'did I really just tackle him'. I played with 90 per cent of that squad to be honest. I'm proud to say I've played with them and there's an element of me that wishes I was playing with them still. The dream is to work hard and get one more chance. I was very fortunate to play and train with them. You appreciate what goes on behind the scenes to make them as good as they are.

— Ribeiro speaking about his former international teammates who represented Wales at UEFA Euro 2016.

Ribeiro played at various youth levels for Wales. On 24 September 2005, he scored a 25-yard goal for the under-17 team in their 2–0 qualifying win over Estonia in Rhyl. He took part in the under-19 squad that played in the Milk Cup in 2007. On 12 November 2007 he was called up for the under-21 team for the matches against Bosnia and Herzegovina and France. Ribeiro scored once for the under-21 team, opening a 2–1 win over Italy on 4 September 2009, in a European qualifier at the Liberty Stadium.

He was first called up to the senior squad for the 2010 World Cup qualifier against Russia later that month, calling his selection by John Toshack a "fantastic reward" that was deserved due to his battles with injury and adding that he would learn by training against other Welsh internationals like Craig Bellamy. Ribeiro made his debut on 23 May 2010 against Croatia at the Gradski vrt stadium, Osijek, replacing Chris Gunter for the last nine minutes of a 2–0 loss. He was the last of five Welshmen to make their debut that day, and was tasked with marking Luka Modrić, but suffered a slipped spinal disc which ruled him out again. On 12 October, he earned his only other cap as Wales fell 4–1 away to Switzerland in a UEFA Euro 2012 qualifying match, replacing Darcy Blake after 55 minutes. He fouled Tranquillo Barnetta for a penalty which Gökhan Inler scored.

Despite the brevity of his international career, Ribeiro expressed pride in 2016 that he had played alongside players who took Wales to the semi-finals at that year's European Championship, among them Gareth Bale and Aaron Ramsey.

== Career statistics ==
=== Club ===
As of match played 7 November 2017

Appearances and goals by club, season and competition
Club	Season	League			FA Cup		League Cup		Other		Total	
Club	Season	Division	Apps	Goals	Apps	Goals	Apps	Goals	Apps	Goals	Apps	Goals
Bristol City	2008–09	Championship	0	0	0	0	1	0	–		1	0
Bristol City	2009–10	Championship	5	0	0	0	1	0	–		6	0
Bristol City	2010–11	Championship	9	0	1	0	0	0	–		10	0
Bristol City	2011–12	Championship	0	0	0	0	0	0	–		0	0
Bristol City	Total		14	0	1	0	2	0	–		17	0
Stockport County (loan)	2009–10	League One	7	0	0	0	0	0	0	0	7	0
Colchester United (loan)	2009–10	League One	2	0	0	0	0	0	0	0	2	0
Carlisle United (loan)	2011–12	League One	5	0	2	0	0	0	0	0	7	0
Scunthorpe United (loan)	2011–12	League One	10	0	0	0	0	0	0	0	10	0
Scunthorpe United	2012–13	League One	28	2	1	0	2	0	1 (Note: Appearances in the Football League Trophy)	0	32	2
Scunthorpe United	2013–14	League Two	21	0	2	0	1	0	1	0	25	0
Scunthorpe United	Total		49	2	3	0	3	0	2	0	57	2
Exeter City	2014–15	League Two	37	2	1	0	0	0	1	0	39	2
Exeter City	2015–16	League Two	35	4	2	0	1	0	1	0	39	4
Exeter City	Total		72	6	3	0	1	0	2	0	78	6
Oxford United	2016–17	League One	3	0	0	0	0	0	0	0	3	0
Oxford United	2017–18	League One	10	1	1	0	1	0	2 (Note: Appearances in EFL Trophy)	0	14	1
Oxford United	Total		13	1	1	0	1	0	2	0	17	1
Career total			172	9	10	0	7	0	6	0	195	9

=== International ===
Team	Year	Apps	Goals
Wales	2010	2	0
Total		2	0

== Honours ==
Oxford United

- EFL Trophy runner-up: 2016–17
