= James Henry (footballer) =

English footballer (born 1989)

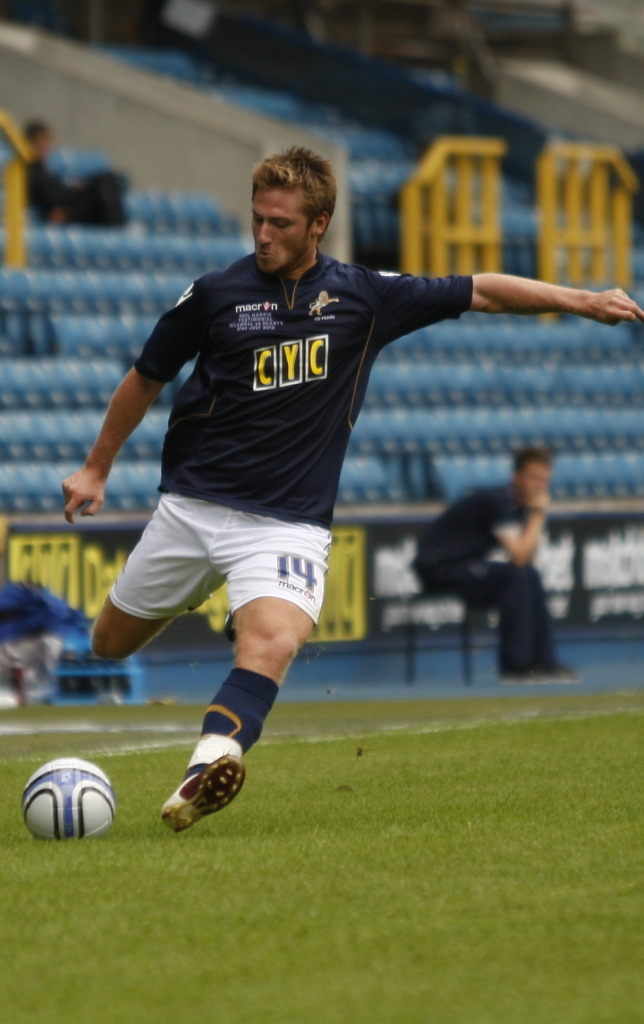
- Henry playing for Millwall against Hearts

Personal information
- Full name: James Henry
- Date of birth: 10 June 1989 (age 37)
- Place of birth: Reading, England
- Height: 6 ft 1 in (1.85 m)
- Position: Midfielder

Team information
- Current team: Basingstoke Town (player-coach)

Youth career
- –2006: Reading

Senior career*
Years	Team	Apps	(Gls)
2006–2010	Reading	10	(0)
2007	→ Nottingham Forest (loan)	1	(0)
2007–2008	→ AFC Bournemouth (loan)	11	(4)
2008	→ Norwich City (loan)	3	(0)
2009	→ Millwall (loan)	16	(3)
2009	→ Millwall (loan)	9	(5)
2010–2014	Millwall	121	(10)
2013	→ Wolverhampton Wanderers (loan)	11	(4)
2014–2017	Wolverhampton Wanderers	99	(18)
2016–2017	→ Bolton Wanderers (loan)	30	(1)
2017–2024	Oxford United	218	(51)
2024–2026	Aldershot Town	71	(17)
2026–	Basingstoke Town	0	(0)

International career
2004	Scotland U16	2	(0)
2007	England U18	1	(0)
2007	Scotland U19		
2007–2008	England U19	7	(2)
- * Club domestic league appearances and goals as of 16:21, 4 July 2026 (UTC)

James Henry (born 10 June 1989) is an English footballer who plays as a right winger for Southern League Premier Division South club Basingstoke Town, where he holds the role of player-coach.

A product of the Reading academy, Henry spent loan spells at Nottingham Forest, AFC Bournemouth, Norwich City, and Millwall (twice), before joining Millwall permanently in 2010. He went on to join Wolverhampton Wanderers, helping Wolves to promotion from League One. In 2017, he signed for Oxford United, making over 200 appearances for the club and twice finishing a season as their top scorer. He joined Aldershot Town in August 2024.

== Club career ==
=== Reading ===
Henry was born in Reading. He grew up in Woodley, attending Waingels College, and started his playing career at local club Woodley Saints. Henry, a right winger who has also played centre midfield, rose through Reading's youth academy and signed a one-year professional contract with Reading in June 2006. He missed most of the 2005–06 season with a cruciate knee injury. Following limited first-team opportunities during Reading's first season in the Premier League, on 22 March 2007 he joined Nottingham Forest on loan until the end of the 2006–07 season, yet returned to Reading after just three weeks after failing to make an impact. Henry played in just one match, coming on as a late substitute.

Henry finally made his debut for Reading on 24 September 2007, coming on in the 80th minute of a 4–2 home defeat to Liverpool in the third round of the League Cup.

On 2 November 2007 Henry joined AFC Bournemouth on loan until 8 December (later extended to 3 January 2008), and scored two goals on his debut for the club a day later, in a 2–0 victory at Bristol Rovers. He also scored in a 1–1 draw between Bournemouth and Hartlepool. He made another loan move on 31 January 2008, this time joining Championship side Norwich City for three months, but the loan was cut short on 17 March 2008 because of Reading's concern at his lack of first-team action with Norwich.

On 5 March 2008, Henry signed a contract extension with Reading to July 2010.

Henry scored his first competitive goal for Reading on his full debut, on 12 August 2008, with the opening goal in a 2–1 win over Dagenham and Redbridge in the League Cup first round. He scored again in the next round as Reading thrashed Luton 5–1. Then in the next round against Stoke City, he scored twice to bring his tally for that League Cup campaign to four. The game finished 2–2, however, and Henry missed a vital penalty in the shootout as Reading lost.

Henry made his full league debut for Reading on 9 December 2008 against Blackpool, replacing the suspended Jimmy Kébé on the right wing.

=== Millwall ===
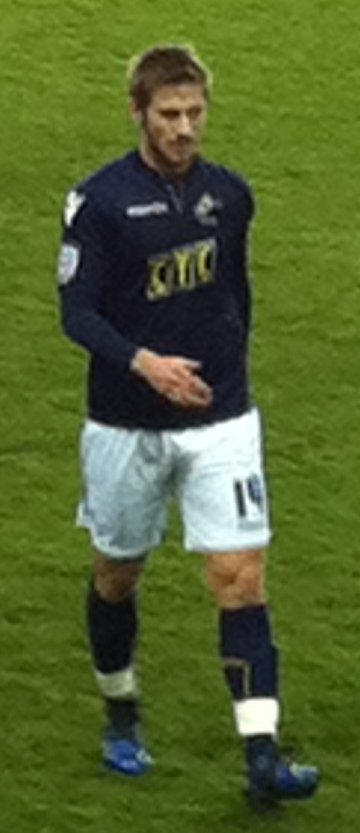
Henry playing for Millwall against Crystal Palace

Henry moved on loan to Millwall on 14 March 2009 on a one-month emergency loan. On his home debut he scored from 35 yards in the last minute to earn his side a 1–1 draw with Swindon Town, and followed it with a penalty away at Cheltenham.

On 10 June, new Reading manager Brendan Rodgers told the local press "I wanted to take James to Chelsea when he was 16. I felt he was a big talent and still is. I thought being around big players and coming into that environment would be a big help in developing his game, but he made the right choice in the end."

On 10 September 2009, Millwall signed Henry on loan for his second spell with the club until the end of the year. On 3 October, Henry scored a hat-trick against Tranmere Rovers for Millwall. He then went on to score the stoppage time winner, a long-range free kick, in a 2–1 victory over Colchester at the Den. His loan spell finished when he was injured and returned to Reading.

On 28 July 2010, Henry signed for Millwall on a permanent basis, signing a three-year contract. On his home debut against Hull City, he set up all four goals in a 4–0 victory. He scored his first goal as a permanent signing for Millwall against Scunthorpe United, in a 3–0 win.

=== Wolverhampton Wanderers ===
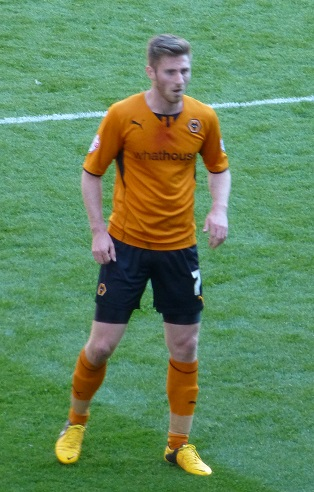
Henry playing for Wolves in April 2014

On 1 October 2013 Henry moved on loan to Wolverhampton Wanderers of League One, where he reunited with his former Millwall manager Kenny Jackett. His loan lasted until January 2014 but was with a view to it becoming a permanent transfer. Henry scored four times during 13 loan appearances for the club, before it was announced on 31 December 2013 that a permanent two-and-a-half-year deal would be confirmed when the January transfer window opened.

Henry was part of the Wolves team that won the League One title with a record points tally and remained a regular member of the team over the following two seasons. In 2015, he signed a new contract until summer 2017 (with the option of a further year). He was released at the end of his contract.

==== Bolton Wanderers (loan) ====
On 31 August 2016 Henry was loaned to League One side Bolton Wanderers until January 2017. Three days later he made his Bolton debut as the club came from behind to draw 1–1 with Southend United at the Macron Stadium. He scored his first goal for Bolton in a 2–1 win against Scunthorpe United on 31 December 2016. On 6 January 2017 his loan at Bolton was extended until the end of the season.

=== Oxford United ===
On 12 July 2017, Henry signed for League One club Oxford United. He made his debut as a substitute against Oldham Athletic in the opening match of the 2017–18 season, which ended in a 2–0 away victory for Oxford. He scored his first goal for Oxford in an EFL Trophy tie against Stevenage on 29 August 2017, and his first League goal in a 3–1 defeat to Blackpool on 16 September. He finished the 2017–18 season with 11 goals (10 in the league), joint top-scorer alongside Wes Thomas.

In 2018–19 he was top scorer for the club, with 15 goals (11 in the league). He signed a new two-year deal in October 2019, and went on to score 14 goals (12 in the league) in the 2019–20 season, one fewer in all competitions than Matty Taylor, the club's leading scorer.

During 2023 Henry suffered a succession of injuries but recovered to make his 600th senior appearance against Cambridge United on 26 December. He ended up making 14 league appearances that season, at the end of which Oxford were promoted to the EFL Championship through the play-offs, but at the end of the 2023–24 season he was released.

=== Aldershot Town ===
On 3 August 2024, Henry joined National League club Aldershot Town following his release from Oxford. On 10 August he scored on his Shots debut against Forest Green Rovers, having come on as substitute. Having ended the opening month of the season as the league's top scorer with five goals, he was named Player of the Month for August.

In June 2025, Henry signed a new contract to remain with the club in the role of player/first-team coach.

=== Basingstoke Town ===
In July 2026, Henry joined Southern League Premier Division South club Basingstoke Town, also taking a coaching role with the club.

== International career ==
Henry has played for Scotland U19s (for whom he qualifies through his parents) and England U18s, and was called up to the England U19 squad on 11 September 2007.

== Career statistics ==
As of match played 23 May 2024

Appearances and goals by club, season and competition
Club	Season	League			FA Cup		League Cup		Other		Total	
Club	Season	Division	Apps	Goals	Apps	Goals	Apps	Goals	Apps	Goals	Apps	Goals
Reading	2006–07	Premier League	0	0	0	0	0	0	0	0	0	0
Reading	2007–08	Premier League	0	0	0	0	1	0	0	0	1	0
Reading	2008–09	Championship	7	0	1	0	3	4	0	0	11	4
Reading	2009–10	Championship	3	0	1	0	2	0	0	0	6	0
Reading	Total		10	0	2	0	6	4	0	0	18	4
Nottingham Forest (loan)	2006–07	League One	1	0	0	0	0	0	0	0	1	0
AFC Bournemouth (loan)	2007–08	League One	11	4	0	0	0	0	0	0	11	4
Norwich City (loan)	2007–08	Championship	3	0	0	0	0	0	0	0	3	0
Millwall (loan)	2008–09	League One	16	3	0	0	0	0	2 (Note: Appearances in League One play-offs)	0	18	3
Millwall (loan)	2009–10	League One	9	5	0	0	0	0	0	0	9	5
Millwall	2010–11	Championship	42	5	1	0	3	0	0	0	46	5
Millwall	2011–12	Championship	39	0	4	0	2	0	0	0	45	0
Millwall	2012–13	Championship	35	4	4	1	1	0	0	0	40	5
Millwall	2013–14	Championship	5	0	0	0	1	0	0	0	6	0
Millwall	Total		121	9	9	1	7	0	0	0	137	10
Wolverhampton Wanderers (loan)	2013–14	League One	11	4	1	0	0	0	1 (Note: Appearances in Football League Trophy)	0	13	4
Wolverhampton Wanderers	2013–14	League One	21	6	0	0	0	0	0	0	21	6
Wolverhampton Wanderers	2014–15	Championship	37	5	2	0	1	0	0	0	40	5
Wolverhampton Wanderers	2015–16	Championship	39	7	1	0	2	0	0	0	42	7
Wolverhampton Wanderers	2016–17	Championship	2	0	0	0	2	0	0	0	4	0
Wolverhampton Wanderers	Total		99	18	3	0	5	0	0	0	107	18
Bolton Wanderers (loan)	2016–17	League One	30	1	3	1	0	0	2 (Note: Appearance(s) in EFL Trophy)	0	35	2
Oxford United	2017–18	League One	42	10	1	0	1	0	4	1	48	11
Oxford United	2018–19	League One	44	11	4	2	3	0	5	2	56	15
Oxford United	2019–20	League One	30	12	2	1	3	1	3	0	38	14
Oxford United	2020–21	League One	37	7	0	0	1	0	5 (Note: Appearances in EFL Trophy and League One play-offs)	0	43	7
Oxford United	2021–22	League One	26	7	1	0	0	0	1	0	28	7
Oxford United	2022–23	League One	25	2	2	0	1	0	1	0	29	2
Oxford United	2023–24	League One	14	2	1	0	0	0	3	0	18	2
Oxford United	Total		218	51	11	3	9	1	21	3	259	58
Career total			529	96	29	5	27	5	26	3	611	109

== Honours ==
Wolverhampton Wanderers

- Football League One: 2013–14

Bolton Wanderers

- EFL League One second-place promotion: 2016–17

Oxford United

- EFL League One play-offs: 2024

Aldershot Town

- FA Trophy: 2024–25

Individual

- National League Player of the Month: August 2024

== See also ==
- List of sportspeople who competed for more than one nation
