= Ewen Fields =

Sports venue in Hyde, England

Coordinates: 53°27′02″N 2°04′05″W

- The Shed End and the Main Stand after the June 2010 makeover
- Interactive map of Ewen Fields
- Full name: Ewen Fields
- Former names: The Tameside Stadium
- Location: Walker Lane; Hyde; Cheshire; SK14 5PL
- Owner: Hyde United
- Operator: Hyde United
- Capacity: 4,250 (530 seated)
- Surface: artificial 4G

Construction
- Groundbreaking: 1884
- Opened: 1885

Tenants
- Hyde United F.C. (1885–1898; 1906–17; 1920–present); Manchester City F.C. Reserves and Academy (2010–2015); Stretford Paddock F.C. (2024–present)

Ewen Fields in Hyde, Greater Manchester, England, is the home ground of Hyde United F.C. and has also hosted Manchester City Reserves, Manchester United F.C. Reserves, Stockport County Reserves and Oldham Curzon Ladies. The stadium holds 4,250 people, with 530 seats.

== History ==
The stadium formerly used Baspograss, on which Hyde United played Darlington in the 1st round proper in 1994, the last non-qualifying FA Cup game on an artificial surface for twenty years, until Maidstone United played Stevenage on their artificial surface in 2014.

It also hosted an American football team, the Manchester Spartans, in the 1980s after a surge in the sport's popularity in the UK following Channel 4's coverage of live NFL games. A Rugby league Super League game between Oldham and Sheffield was staged at the stadium in 1997.

In 2010, Hyde United changed their name to Hyde F.C. and had a kit change to black and white. Ewen Fields had a make over in summer 2010, funded by Manchester City as part of the clubs' partnership. In 2015, the club reverted to being called Hyde United.

== Structure and facilities ==
Ewen Fields is made up of five stands, the Main Stand, the Scrattin Shed, the Tinker's Passage End, the Leigh Street Stand and the Walker Lane End. All of the stands are covered.

The Main Stand is the only seated stand at Ewen Fields. It also houses the players' dressing rooms, board room and sponsors lounge as well as a refreshments bar and toilets.

Next to the Main Stand is the Scrattin' Shed, although it is more commonly known as the Shed End, despite not actually being at the end of the ground. This is where the most vociferous home fans usually congregate. The Social Club is behind the Shed, and traverses the boundary wall. There is a door inside the ground, and one in the car park.

The Tinker's Passage End (named after the footpath which runs behind the stand) is behind the goal nearest to the Scrattin' Shed. Unusually, the stand runs at an acute angle to the goal line. This is because the pitch prior to the Astroturf was not a perfect rectangle, and the stand, which used to be parallel to the goal line, shows the extent of this previous irregularity. Away fans are housed in the Tinker's Passage End on the rare occasions that games at Ewen Fields are segregated.

Running opposite to the Main Stand and Scrattin' Shed is the Leigh Street Stand, behind the home and away dugouts where another set of home fans stand. A second refreshments bar is also on this side.

The Walker Lane End (sometimes referred to as the Baths End due to the leisure centre behind the stand) is behind the goal at the opposite end to the Tinker's Passage End. When the Astroturf was laid, and the pitch realigned, it was also lengthened at this end. As a result, the Walker Lane Stand was built afterwards, and is parallel to the goal line.
