= 2017–18 Oxford United F.C. season =

English football club season

Oxford United
2017–18 season
- Chairman: Darryl Eales (until February 2018); Sumrith Thanakarnjanasuth (from February 2018)
- Head Coach: Pep Clotet (until 22 January 2018); Derek Fazackerley (caretaker) (from 23 January 2018 till 22 March 2018); Karl Robinson (from 22 March 2018)
- Stadium: Kassam Stadium
- League One: 16th
- FA Cup: First round (eliminated by Port Vale)
- EFL Cup: First round (eliminated by Cheltenham Town)
- EFL Trophy: Fourth round (eliminated by Chelsea U21s)
- Top goalscorer: League: Wes Thomas, James Henry (10); All: Wes Thomas, James Henry (11)
- Highest home attendance: 9,510 (v Portsmouth, 12 August)
- Lowest home attendance: 1,074 (v Brighton & Hove Albion U21s, 3 October)

The 2017–18 season was Oxford United's second consecutive season in League One and their 124th year in existence. As well as competing in League One, the club participated in the FA Cup, EFL Cup and EFL Trophy.

Before the start of the season, manager Michael Appleton resigned to become assistant manager at Leicester City. His replacement Pep Clotet, formerly assistant manager at Leeds United, in contrast to Appleton's policy of signing promising young British players, signed a mix of foreign players, among them Dwight Tiendalli, Xemi Fernández, Ivo Pękalski, Agon Mehmeti and Ricardinho (the first Brazilian to play for Oxford), and seasoned British pros including Jonathan Obika from rivals Swindon Town, James Henry, Mike Williamson and John Mousinho. A number of influential players, among them Chey Dunkley, Liam Sercombe, top scorer Chris Maguire, captain John Lundstram and record signing Marvin Johnson, left the club. Incoming loanees included Jack Payne from Huddersfield Town and Gino van Kessel from Slavia Prague. Striker Kane Hemmings and defender Charlie Raglan were given season-long loans at Mansfield Town and Port Vale respectively. Curtis Nelson was appointed club captain following the departure of Lundstram.

Results started reasonably with an away win over Oldham Athletic (who were to be relegated at the end of the season) and a home win over Portsmouth in front of what turned out to be the club's largest home crowd of the season. After 15 games the club were in the play-off places, but form declined through the late autumn. Curtis Nelson ruptured his Achilles tendon during a home defeat to Northampton Town in November, and John Mousinho was appointed captain in his place (until Nelson's eventual return in April). Oxford suffered a record 7–0 home defeat at the hands of eventual champions Wigan Athletic on 23 December. During the January transfer window, Payne was recalled by his parent club, Xemi was released from his contract and Robert Dickie and Cameron Brannagan were signed from Reading and Liverpool respectively. Three young loanees were recruited from Premier League clubs: Isaac Buckley-Ricketts and Ashley Smith-Brown from Manchester City and Todd Kane from Chelsea.

After a home defeat to bottom club Bury, Clotet was sacked with the club in 10th place. Caretaker-manager Derek Fazackerley presided over the team for two months, in which time they won only twice in eight games and dropped to 15th place.

Midway through Fazackerley's tenure, the club announced that Thai businessman Sumrith Thanakarnjanasuth, formerly a member of the owning consortium at rivals Reading, had become the new owner of the club. Thanakarnjanasuth appointed Karl Robinson as the club's permanent manager on 22 March 2018. Robinson had to wait five games for his first win, but his aim of retaining the club's League One status was achieved with three wins from the last five games of the season. The club finished in 16th place on 56 points, six points above the relegation zone.

United were eliminated by lower-league opposition in the opening rounds of the League Cup and FA Cup, by Cheltenham Town and Port Vale respectively. Having been losing finalists for the previous two seasons, they reached the last 8 of the EFL Trophy but were eliminated by Chelsea U21s.

Midfielder James Henry and striker Wes Thomas were the club's leading scorers, each with 11 goals (10 in the League). For the second season running, goalkeeper Simon Eastwood played every minute of every league game, though he was rested for a couple of EFL Trophy matches. Midfielder Ryan Ledson, the subject of persistent transfer rumours, was voted the Supporters' Player of the Season.

== Transfers ==
=== Transfers in ===
Date from	Position	Nationality	Name	From	Fee	Ref.
1 July 2017	CB	(Republic of Ireland)	Fiacre Kelleher	Celtic	Free	
1 July 2017	CB	(England)	Charlie Raglan	Chesterfield	Free	
1 July 2017	GK	(Scotland)	Scott Shearer	Mansfield Town	Free	
6 July 2017	CF	(England)	Jonathan Obika	Swindon Town	Free	
12 July 2017	RW	(England)	James Henry	Wolverhampton Wanderers	Free	
13 July 2017	RB	(Netherlands)	Dwight Tiendalli	Free agent	Free	
18 July 2017	CM	(Spain)	Xemi Fernández	(Spain) Barcelona B	Free	
26 July 2017	CB	(England)	Mike Williamson	Wolverhampton Wanderers	Free	
3 August 2017	LB	(Brazil)	Ricardinho	(Azerbaijan) Gabala	Free	
8 August 2017	CM	(Sweden)	Ivo Pękalski	(Sweden) Halmstad	Undisclosed	
31 August 2017	CB	(England)	John Mousinho	Burton Albion	Free	
7 September 2017	CF	(Albania)	Agon Mehmeti	Free agent	Free	
1 December 2017	GK	(England)	Max Harris	Hereford	Undisclosed	
4 January 2018	CB	(England)	Robert Dickie	Reading	Undisclosed	
11 January 2018	CM	(England)	Cameron Brannagan	Liverpool	Undisclosed	

=== Transfers out ===
Date from	Position	Nationality	Name	To	Fee	Ref.
1 July 2017	GK	(Liechtenstein)	Benjamin Büchel	Free agent	Released	
1 July 2017	CB	(England)	Robbie Cundy	Gloucester City	Released	
1 July 2017	CB	(England)	Chey Dunkley	Wigan Athletic	Free	
1 July 2017	RM	(England)	Jonny Giles	Free agent	Released	
1 July 2017	CF	(England)	Jordan Graham	Free agent	Released	
1 July 2017	CM	(England)	Liam Sercombe	Bristol Rovers	Undisclosed	
1 July 2017	LB	(England)	Joe Skarz	Bury	Mutual consent	(Note: Skarz joined Bury following his departure.)
1 July 2017	CB	(England)	Miles Welch-Hayes	Bath City	Released	(Note: Welch-Hayes joined Bath City following his departure.)
20 July 2017	CF	(Scotland)	Chris Maguire	Bury	Free	
25 July 2017	CM	(England)	John Lundstram	Sheffield United	Undisclosed	
31 August 2017	LM	(England)	Marvin Johnson	Middlesbrough	Undisclosed	
22 November 2017	RB	(Wales)	Christian Ribeiro	Retired	—N/a	
30 January 2018	CM	(Spain)	Xemi Fernández	Free agent	Mutual consent	

=== Loans in ===
Start date	Position	Nationality	Name	From	End date	Ref.
28 July 2017	AM	(England)	Jack Payne	Huddersfield Town	15 January 2018	
10 August 2017	FW	(Curaçao)	Gino van Kessel	Slavia Prague	30 June 2018	
31 August 2017	CM	(England)	Alex Mowatt	Barnsley	30 June 2018	
12 January 2018	FW	(England)	Isaac Buckley-Ricketts	Manchester City	30 June 2018	
29 January 2018	DF	(England)	Ashley Smith-Brown	Manchester City	30 June 2018	
31 January 2018	DF	(England)	Todd Kane	Chelsea	30 June 2018	

=== Loans out ===
Start date	Position	Nationality	Name	To	End date	Ref.
3 August 2017	CB	(Republic of Ireland)	Fiacre Kelleher	Solihull Moors	30 June 2018	
22 August 2017	FW	(England)	Kane Hemmings	Mansfield Town	30 June 2018	
24 August 2017	GK	(England)	Jack Stevens	Oxford City	January 2018	
24 August 2017	MF	(England)	Malachi Napa	Hampton & Richmond Borough	January 2018	
29 August 2017	GK	(England)	Manny Agboola	North Leigh	January 2018	
15 December 2017	FW	(England)	James Roberts	Guiseley	30 June 2018	
22 December 2017	MF	(Grenada)	Shandon Baptiste	Hampton & Richmond Borough	February 2018	
5 January 2018	GK	(England)	Manny Agboola	Hampton & Richmond Borough	February 2018	
19 January 2018	GK	(England)	Jack Stevens	Tamworth	February 2018	
19 January 2018	DF	(England)	Sam Long	Hampton & Richmond Borough	February 2018	
30 January 2018	DF	(England)	Charlie Raglan	Port Vale	30 June 2018	
16 February 2018	GK	(England)	Manny Agboola	Leatherhead	30 June 2018	

== Competitions ==
=== Friendlies ===
Oxford United played six pre-season friendlies, against Oxford City, Middlesbrough and Hull City (in Portugal), Brentford, Birmingham City and Leeds United. A proposed friendly against Lincoln City was cancelled.

8 July 2017	Oxford City	0–3	Oxford United	Marston
15:00 BST		Report	Rothwell 12'; Hemmings 13'; Thomas 88'	Stadium: Marsh Lane; Attendance: 2,276

12 July 2017	Oxford United	0–0	Middlesbrough	Albufeira, Portugal
18:30 Western European Summer Time		Report		Stadium: Estadio da Nora; Attendance: 800 (approx.)

15 July 2017	Oxford United	2–1	Hull City	Albufeira, Portugal
18:30 WEST	Thomas 32' 52'	Report	Diomande 75'	Stadium: Estadio da Nora

19 July 2017	Oxford United	3–4	Brentford	Oxford
19:45 BST	Johnson 39' (pen.); Hemmings 56'; Henry 61'	Report	Jozefzoon 9'; Vibe 31'; Cole 77'; Canós 79'	Stadium: Kassam Stadium; Attendance: 2,216 (376 away); Referee: John Busby

22 July 2017	Oxford United	0–2	Birmingham City	Oxford
15:00 BST		Report	Davis 9'; Adams 29'	Stadium: Kassam Stadium; Attendance: 3,507

29 July 2017	Leeds United	2–0	Oxford United	Leeds
15:00 BST	Roofe 35'; Dallas 84'	Report		Stadium: Elland Road

=== League One ===
==== League table ====
Pos	Team	Pld	W	D	L	GF	GA	GD	Pts
14	Fleetwood Town	46	16	9	21	59	68	−9	57
15	Doncaster Rovers	46	13	17	16	52	52	0	56
16	Oxford United	46	15	11	20	61	66	−5	56
17	Gillingham	46	13	17	16	50	55	−5	56
18	AFC Wimbledon	46	13	14	19	47	58	−11	53

Source: BBC Sport
Rules for classification: 1) Points; 2) Goal difference; 3) Number of goals scored

==== Result summary ====
Overall								Home						Away					
Pld	W	D	L	GF	GA	GD	Pts	W	D	L	GF	GA	GD	W	D	L	GF	GA	GD
46	15	11	20	61	66	−5	56	9	6	8	34	32	+2	6	5	12	27	34	−7

Last updated: 5 May 2018.
Source: BBC Sport

==== Results by matchday ====
Matchday	1	2	3	4	5	6	7	8	9	10	11	12	13	14	15	16	17	18	19	20	21	22	23	24	25	26	27	28	29	30	31	32	33	34	35	36	37	38	39	40	41	42	43	44	45	46
Ground	A	H	A	H	A	H	H	A	H	A	A	H	A	H	H	A	H	A	H	A	H	A	H	A	A	H	H	A	H	A	H	A	H	A	A	H	A	H	A	H	H	H	A	A	H	A
Result	W	W	L	D	D	W	D	L	L	L	W	W	W	D	D	L	L	W	L	D	W	D	L	D	L	W	W	L	L	W	L	L	L	D	L	W	L	D	L	D	L	W	L	W	W	L
Position	2	1	5	7	9	6	8	10	12	15	13	10	6	6	7	10	10	7	8	9	8	8	10	10	12	10	10	10	10	10	12	13	15	15	16	15	16	17	17	17	17	17	17	16	14	16

Updated to match(es) played on 5 May 2018. Source: BBC Sport
A = Away; H = Home; W = Win; D = Draw; L = Loss

==== Matches ====
On 21 June 2017, the league fixtures were announced.

5 August 2017 1	Oldham Athletic	0–2	Oxford United	Oldham
15:00 BST	McLaughlin (yellow card) 71'	Report	Thomas 39'; Rothwell (yellow card) 68'; Ruffels 71'; Williamson (yellow card) 79'	Stadium: Boundary Park; Attendance: 4,874 (1,067 away); Referee: David Webb

12 August 2017 2	Oxford United	3–0	Portsmouth	Oxford
15:00 BST	Thomas 47' van Kessel 82'; Ruffels 90+4'	Report		Stadium: Kassam Stadium; Attendance: 9,510 (1,810 away); Referee: Graham Salisbury

19 August 2017 3	Scunthorpe United	1–0	Oxford United	Scunthorpe
15:00 BST	Morris 83'; Hopper (yellow card) 85'	Report	Ruffels (yellow card) 49'; Henry (yellow card) 72'	Stadium: Glanford Park; Attendance: 4,205 (556 away); Referee: Darren Handley

26 August 2017 4	Oxford United	1–1	Shrewsbury Town	Oxford
15:00 BST	van Kessel 75'	Report	Payne 83'	Stadium: Kassam Stadium; Attendance: 7,120 (442 away); Referee: Nick Kinseley

2 September 2017 5	Milton Keynes Dons	1–1	Oxford United	Denbigh
15:00 BST	Upson (yellow card) 51'; Brittain 60'	Report	Hall 8'; Henry (yellow card) 57'; Ricardinho (yellow card) 86'	Stadium: Stadium mk Attendance: 10,746 (2,924 away); Referee: Dean Whitestone

9 September 2017 6	Oxford United	3–0	Gillingham	Oxford
15:00 BST	Payne 48'; Rothwell 54'; Hall 56'	Report		Stadium: Kassam Stadium; Attendance: 6,730 (382 away); Referee: Michael Salisbury

12 September 2017 7	Oxford United	2–2	Bradford City	Oxford
19:45 BST	Thomas 74'; Rothwell (yellow card) 49' (goal) 87'	Report	Patrick 30'; Vincelot 90+4'	Stadium: Kassam Stadium; Attendance: 6,558 (403 away); Referee: Chris Sarginson

16 September 2017 8	Blackpool	3–1	Oxford United	Blackpool
15:00 BST	Vassell 6', 90+4'; Cooke 15'; Tilt (yellow card) 45+2'; Ryan (yellow card) 78'; Daniel (yellow card) 90+8'	Report	Ricardinho (yellow card) 31'; Ledson (yellow card) 57'; Henry 90'; Rothwell (yellow card) 90+6'	Stadium: Bloomfield Road; Attendance: 5,274 (1,632 away); Referee: Darren Handley

23 September 2017 9	Oxford United	1–2	Walsall	Oxford
15:00 BST	Rothwell (yellow card) 28'; Ledson 78' (pen.)	Report	Oztumer 32'; Roberts 53'	Stadium: Kassam Stadium; Attendance: 6,895 (403 away); Referee: Scott Oldham

26 September 2017 10	Bury	3–0	Oxford United	Bury
17:45 BST	Laurent (yellow card) 59'; Maguire 78' (pen.); Smith 70'; Beckford 72'; Edwards (yellow card) 76'; Dobre (yellow card) 88'	Report	Hall (yellow card) 65'	Stadium: Gigg Lane; Attendance: 2,951 (287 away); Referee: Ben Toner

30 September 2017 11	Peterborough United	1–4	Oxford United	Peterborough
15:00 BST	Marriott 15'; Miller (yellow card) 31'	Report	Nelson (yellow card) 30'; Ricardinho (yellow card) 38'; Ruffels 48'; Thomas 53'; Rothwell 75'; Mehmeti 82'	Stadium: London Road Stadium; Attendance: 6,153 (757 away); Referee: Tom Nield

7 October 2017 12	Oxford United	3–0	AFC Wimbledon	Oxford
15:00 BST	Thomas 12' da Silva 48'; Xemi 85'	Report		Stadium: Kassam Stadium; Attendance: 7,241 (542 away); Referee: Darren Drysdale

14 October 2017 13	Bristol Rovers	0–1	Oxford United	Bristol
15:00 BST	Clarke (yellow card) 45'; Gaffney (yellow card) 47'; Sercombe (yellow card) 70'	Report	Henry (yellow card) 45+3'; Mousinho (yellow card) 50'; Ribeiro (yellow card) 61'; Rothwell (yellow card) 77'; Mowatt 82'	Stadium: Memorial Stadium; Attendance: 9,656 (1,244 away); Referee: Ross Joyce

17 October 2017 14	Oxford United	1–1	Charlton Athletic	Oxford
19:45 BST	Ledson (yellow card) 8'; Henry (yellow card) 16'; Ribeiro 35'	Report	Fosu-Henry 18'; Kashi (yellow card) 32'	Stadium: Kassam Stadium; Attendance: 7,070 (689 away); Referee: Charles Breakspear

21 October 2017 15	Oxford United	3–3	Rotherham United	Oxford
15:00 BST	Payne 21'; Ruffels 30'; Nelson 40'; Carroll (yellow card) 45'; Ledson (yellow card) 62'	Report	Newell 20'; Vaulks (yellow card) 33'; Williams 44'; Moore 78'; Mattock (yellow card) 90+2'	Stadium: Kassam Stadium; Attendance: 7,471 (608 away); Referee: Seb Stockbridge

28 October 2017 16	Fleetwood Town	2–0	Oxford United	Fleetwood
15:00 BST	Grant 88'; Hiwula 90+3'	Report		Stadium: Highbury Stadium; Attendance: 3,261 (609 away); Referee: Trevor Kettle

11 November 2017 17	Oxford United	1–2	Northampton Town	Oxford
15:00 GMT	Thomas 44'	Report	Taylor 11'; Long 45+1'; Grimes (yellow card) 80'; McGugan (yellow card) 83'; Foley (yellow card) 90+3'	Stadium: Kassam Stadium; Attendance: 8,267 (1,125 away); Referee: Kevin Johnson

18 November 2017 18	Plymouth Argyle	0–4	Oxford United	Plymouth
15:00 GMT	Edwards (red card) 14'; Songo'o (yellow card) 67'	Report	Ledson 15' (pen.); Thomas 52'; Henry 68'; Obika (yellow card) 73' (goal) 77'	Stadium: Home Park; Attendance: 10,805 (837 away); Referee: Graham Horwood

21 November 2017 19	Oxford United	2–4	Blackburn Rovers	Oxford
19:45 GMT	Payne 45+2'; Obika 85'	Report	Mulgrew 6', 22' (pen.) (yellow card) 74'; Antonsson 17'; Nuttall 71'; Downing (yellow card) 82'	Stadium: Kassam Stadium; Attendance: 6,965 (752 away); Referee: John Brooks

25 November 2017 20	Southend United	1–1	Oxford United	Southend
15:00 GMT	Cox 19'; Timlin (yellow card) 44'	Report	Thomas 22'; Xemi (yellow card) 34'; Mowatt (yellow card) 49'	Stadium: Roots Hall; Attendance: 6,797 (566 away); Referee: Dean Whitestone

9 December 2017 21	Oxford United	1–0	Doncaster Rovers	Oxford
15:00 GMT	Tiendalli (yellow card) 35'; Mousinho (yellow card) 39'; Payne (penalty missed) 79'; Ricardinho (yellow card) 88'; Ruffels 90+6'	Report	Wright (yellow card) 68'; Lawlor (yellow card) 79'; Houghton (yellow card) 83'	Stadium: Kassam Stadium; Attendance: 6,711 (462 away); Referee: Seb Stockbridge

16 December 2017 22	Rochdale	0–0	Oxford United	Rochdale
15:00 GMT		Report		Stadium: Spotland Stadium; Attendance: 2,588; Referee: Carl Boyeson

23 December 2017 23	Oxford United	0–7	Wigan Athletic	Oxford
15:00 GMT		Report	Grigg 11', 52', 54'; Powell 18'; Massey 29'; Power 62', 77'	Stadium: Kassam Stadium; Attendance: 7,957 (597 away); Referee: Robert Lewis

26 December 2017 24	Gillingham	1–1	Oxford United	Gillingham
13:00 GMT	Wilkinson 87'	Report	Ricardinho 52'	Stadium: Priestfield Stadium; Attendance: 5,555 (440 away); Referee: Nick Kinseley

30 December 2017 25	Bradford City	3–2	Oxford United	Bradford
15:00 GMT	Wyke 2' (red card) 90+3'; McCartan 54'; Dieng 59'	Report	Carroll 50'; Obika 75'	Stadium: Valley Parade; Attendance: 19,691 (404 away); Referee: Eddie Ilderton

1 January 2018 26	Oxford United	3–1	MK Dons	Oxford
15:00 GMT	Thomas 15' van Kessel 45+1'; Obika 59'; Ledson (yellow card) 67'; Ricardinho (red card) 82'	Report	Williams (yellow card) 11'; Gilbey 25'; Muirhead (yellow card) 45+1'	Stadium: Kassam Stadium; Attendance: 7,628 (650 away); Referee: Andy Woolmer

6 January 2018 27	Oxford United	1–0	Blackpool	Oxford
15:00 GMT	Tiendalli (yellow card) 40'; Obika 80'	Report	Mellor (yellow card) 79'; Tilt (yellow card) 90+5'	Stadium: Kassam Stadium; Attendance: 6,775 (411 away); Referee: Kevin Johnson

13 January 2018 28	Walsall	2–1	Oxford United	Walsall
15:00 GMT	Kinsella (yellow card) 21'; Bakayoko 33'; Oztumer 48'	Report	Martin (yellow card) 66'; Mowatt 70'; Carroll (yellow card) 85'	Stadium: Bescot Stadium; Attendance: 4,569 (1,125 away); Referee: Brett Huxtable

20 January 2018 29	Oxford United	1–2	Bury	Oxford
15:00 GMT	Mousinho (yellow card) 26'; Henry 45'	Report	Dawson (yellow card) 76'; Edwards (yellow card) 79'; Miller 81'; Bunn 84'	Stadium: Kassam Stadium; Attendance: 6,457 (191 away); Referee: Robert Lewis

3 February 2018 30	Charlton Athletic	2–3	Oxford United	Charlton, London
15:00 GMT	Lennon (yellow card) 63'; Kashi 63'; Magennis 78'	Report	Henry 76'; Kane 89'; Ledson (yellow card) 80' (goal) 90+4'	Stadium: The Valley (London); Attendance: 11,747 (1,381 away); Referee: Keith Stroud

10 February 2018 31	Oxford United	1–2	Bristol Rovers	Oxford
15:00 GMT	Rothwell 2'; Martin (yellow card) 22'	Report	Bennett 68', (yellow card) 87'; Harrison 80'	Stadium: Kassam Stadium; Attendance: 8,471 (1,804 away); Referee: Gavin Ward

13 February 2018 32	Rotherham United	3–1	Oxford United	Rotherham
19:45 GMT	Forde 7'; Towell 29'; Smith 52'	Report	Henry 43'	Stadium: New York Stadium; Attendance: 7,707 (360 away); Referee: Eddie Ilderton

17 February 2018 33	Oxford United	0–1	Plymouth Argyle	Oxford
15:00 GMT	Dickie (yellow card) 84'	Report	Bradley 45+3'; Taylor-Sinclair (yellow card) 86'; Taylor (yellow card) 90'	Stadium: Kassam Stadium; Attendance: 8,301 (1,802 away); Referee: Mark Heywood

24 February 2018 34	Northampton Town	0–0	Oxford United	Northampton
15:00 GMT		Report		Stadium: Sixfields Stadium; Attendance: 7,095 (1,444 away); Referee: Martin Coy

10 March 2018 35	AFC Wimbledon	2–1	Oxford United	Kingston upon Thames
15:00 GMT	Taylor 32' (pen.); Forrester (yellow card) 61'; Meades 71'	Report	Kane 38'; Thomas (yellow card) 88'; Brannagan (yellow card) 90+3'	Stadium: Kingsmeadow; Attendance: 4,592 (743 away); Referee: Christopher Sarginson

17 March 2018 36	Oxford United	2–1	Peterborough United	Oxford
15:00 GMT	Dickie 6'; Henry 61'; Ledson (yellow card) 73'	Report	Baldwin (yellow card) 50' (yellow-red card) 90+3'; Marriott 62'; Maddison (yellow card) 90+6'	Stadium: Kassam Stadium; Attendance: 6,804 (708 away); Referee: Robert Lewis

25 March 2018 37	Portsmouth	3–0	Oxford United	Portsmouth
16:00 GMT	Naismith 5' (yellow card) 46'; Thompson (yellow card) 45'; McGee (yellow card) 63'; Pitman 69' 79'	Report	Ledson (yellow card) 14'; Dickie (yellow card) 27'; Mowatt (red card) 62'; Brannagan (yellow card) 75'	Stadium: Fratton Park; Attendance: 17,892 (1,050 away); Referee: Charles Breakspear

30 March 2018 38	Oxford United	1–1	Scunthorpe United	Oxford
12:45 BST	Ledson (yellow card) 14'; Rothwell (yellow card) 34'; Mousinho (yellow card) 35'; Henry 56' (pen.)	Report	Toney 12' (yellow card) 71'; Holmes (yellow card) 55'; McArdle (yellow card) 78'; McGeehan (yellow card) 90+1'	Stadium: Kassam Stadium; Attendance: 7,479 (268 away); Referee: Darren Drysdale

2 April 2018 39	Shrewsbury Town	3–2	Oxford United	Shrewsbury
15:00 BST	Thomas (yellow card) 32'; Whalley 40' 64'; Lowe (yellow card) 45+1'; Nolan 47'; Godfrey (yellow card) 88'	Report	Thomas 62' (yellow card) 90+1'; Rothwell 73'; Brannagan (yellow card) 85'	Stadium: New Meadow; Attendance: 7,191 (674 away); Referee: Seb Stockbridge

7 April 2018 40	Oxford United	0–0	Oldham Athletic	Oxford
15:00 BST	Henry (yellow card) 41'; Thomas (yellow card) 66'	Report	Fané (yellow card) 41'; Moimbé (yellow card) 60'	Stadium: Kassam Stadium; Attendance: 7,096 (492 away); Referee: Eddie Ilderton

10 April 2018 41	Oxford United	0–1	Fleetwood Town	Oxford
19:45 BST		Report	Hunter (yellow card) 54'; McAleny 90+3'	Stadium: Kassam Stadium; Attendance: 6,337 (57 away); Referee: Brendan Malone

14 April 2018 42	Oxford United	2–0	Southend United	Oxford
15:00 BST	Henry 6'; Dickie (yellow card) 16'; Ricardinho 45+4'; Ledson (yellow card) 53'; Mowatt (yellow card) 77'	Report		Stadium: Kassam Stadium; Attendance: 7,332 (776 away); Referee: Darren Handley

17 April 2018 43	Wigan Athletic	1–0	Oxford United	Wigan
19:45 BST	Grigg 87'	Report	Kane (yellow card) 31'; Carroll (yellow card) 75'; Brannagan (yellow card) 80'	Stadium: DW Stadium; Attendance: 8,316 (445 away); Referee: Trevor Kettle

21 April 2018 44	Doncaster Rovers	0–1	Oxford United	Doncaster
15:00 BST	Baudry (yellow card) 6'	Report	Dickie (yellow card) 13'; Brannagan (yellow card) 41'; Henry 63'	Stadium: Keepmoat Stadium; Attendance: 8,255 (1,018 away); Referee: Martin Coy

28 April 2018 45	Oxford United	2–1	Rochdale	Oxford
15:00 BST	Mousinho 62' (pen.); Kane 83' (pen.)	Report	Inman 59'	Stadium: Kassam Stadium; Attendance: 8,375 (540 away); Referee: Nick Kinseley

5 May 2018 46	Blackburn Rovers	2–1	Oxford United	Blackburn
17:30 BST	Lenihan 12'; Payne 76'	Report	Henry 66'	Stadium: Ewood Park; Attendance: 27,600 (1,290 away); Referee: Carl Boyeson

=== FA Cup ===
On 16 October 2017, Oxford United were drawn away to Port Vale in the first round.

3 November 2017 First round	Port Vale	2–0	Oxford United	Burslem
19:45 GMT	Harness (yellow card) 10'; Gunning 16'; Denton (yellow card) 36'; Pope 53'	Report	Thomas (yellow card) 42'; Martin (yellow card) 89'	Stadium: Vale Park; Attendance: 3,443 (396 away); Referee: Mark Heywood

=== EFL Cup ===
On 16 June 2017, Oxford United were drawn at home to Cheltenham Town in the first round.

8 August 2017 First round	Oxford United	3–4 (a.e.t.)	Cheltenham Town	Oxford
19:45 BST	Johnson 21' (pen.); Obika 31'; Xemi 42'; Nelson (yellow card) 73'; Ledson (yellow card) 80'; Ruffles (yellow card) 93'	Report	Eisa 9' 99'; Wright 66' 90'; Storer (yellow card) 78'	Stadium: Kassam Stadium; Attendance: 3,179 (301 away); Referee: Graham Horwood

=== EFL Trophy ===
Pos	Lge	Team	Pld	W	PW	PL	L	GF	GA	GD	Pts	Qualification
1	L1	Milton Keynes Dons (Q)	3	2	1	0	0	6	3	+3	8	Round 2
2	L1	Oxford United (Q)	3	1	0	1	1	11	8	+3	4	Round 2
3	L2	Stevenage (E)	3	1	0	1	1	5	7	−2	4	
4	ACA	Brighton & Hove Albion U21 (E)	3	0	1	0	2	3	7	−4	2	

Updated to match(es) played on 7 November 2017. Source: EFL.com
(E) Eliminated; (Q) Qualified to the phase indicated

29 August 2017 Group stage 1	Stevenage	2–6	Oxford United	Stevenage
19:45 BST	Beautyman 18'; Conlon (yellow card) 49'; Samuel 82'	Report	Henry 30'; Hall 43' 52'; Obika 49'; Xemi (yellow card) 53'; Rothwell 55'; Payne 64'	Stadium: Broadhall Way; Attendance: 799 (152 away); Referee: Charles Breakspear

3 October 2017 Group stage 2	Oxford United	2–2 (4–5 p)	Brighton & Hove Albion U21s	Oxford
19:45 BST	van Kessel 21' 28'	Report	Tilley 36'; Mandriou 67'	Stadium: Kassam Stadium; Attendance: 1,074 (64 away); Referee: Dean Whitestone
	Penalties
	Roberts (penalty scored); Rothwell (penalty missed); Henry (penalty scored); Ruffels (penalty scored); Ashby (penalty scored)		Cox (penalty scored); Tilley (penalty scored); Sanders (penalty scored); Mandriou (penalty scored); Alzate (penalty scored)

7 November 2017 Group stage 3	Oxford United	3–4	Milton Keynes Dons	Oxford
19:45 BST	Payne 33' 39' (pen.); Xemi (yellow card) 64'; Hall 64'	Report	Thomas-Asante 10' (yellow card) 67'; Upson (yellow card) 34'; Lewington (yellow card) 38'; Ariyibi 40' 45'; Seager 66'; Wootton (yellow card) 71'; Agard (yellow card) 88'	Stadium: Kassam Stadium; Attendance: 1,182 (101 away); Referee: Christopher Sarginson

5 December 2017 Second round	Gillingham	1–2	Oxford United	Gillingham
19.00 GMT	Byrne 9' (pen.); Nugent (yellow card) 48'	Report	Payne 31'; Carroll (yellow card) 77'; Ricardinho (yellow card) 86'; Mowatt 90+2'; Mousinho (yellow card) 90+4'	Stadium: Priestfield Stadium; Attendance: 1,224 (62 away); Referee: Charles Breakspear

9 January 2018 Third round	Charlton Athletic	1–1 (0–3 p)	Oxford United	Charlton
19:45 GMT	Ahearne-Grant 7'	Report	Thomas 54'; Carroll (yellow card) 58'	Stadium: The Valley; Attendance: 1,146 (122 away); Referee: Andy Haines
	Penalties
	Jackson (penalty missed); Mavididi (penalty missed); Hackett-Fairchild (penalty missed)		Mowatt (penalty scored); Obika (penalty scored); Ledson (penalty missed); Mehmeti (penalty scored)

23 January 2018 Fourth round	Chelsea U21s	3–0	Oxford United	Fulham
19:45 GMT	St Clair 9'; Redan 16'; Castillo 64'	Report		Stadium: Stamford Bridge; Attendance: 2,643; Referee: John Brooks

== Squad statistics ==
=== Appearances and goals ===
As of 5 May 2018

No.	Pos	Nat	Player	Total		League One		FA Cup		League Cup		FL Trophy	
No.	Pos	Nat	Player	Apps	Goals	Apps	Goals	Apps	Goals	Apps	Goals	Apps	Goals
1	GK	(England) ENG	Simon Eastwood	52	0	46	0	1	0	1	0	4	0
2	DF	(Wales) WAL	Christian Ribeiro	14	1	10	1	1	0	1	0	2	0
3	DF	(Netherlands) NED	Dwight Tiendalli	18	0	12+1	0	1	0	0	0	3+1	0
4	DF	(England) ENG	Mike Williamson	17	0	13+1	0	1	0	0	0	2	0
5	DF	(England) ENG	Curtis Nelson	22	1	17+2	1	0	0	1	0	2	0
6	DF	(England) ENG	Aaron Martin	19	0	10+2	0	0+1	0	1	0	5	0
7	FW	(England) ENG	Robert Hall	17	5	10+3	2	0+1	0	1	0	2	3
8	MF	(England) ENG	Ryan Ledson	49	3	36+7	3	1	0	1	0	4	0
9	FW	(England) ENG	Wes Thomas	39	11	31+5	10	1	0	0+1	0	1	1
10	MF	(England) ENG	Jack Payne	34	7	25+3	3	1	0	0+1	0	4	4
11	FW	(England) ENG	Marvin Johnson	3	1	2	0	0	0	1	1	0	0
11	MF	(England) ENG	Cameron Brannagan	12	0	12	0	0	0	0	0	0	0
13	GK	(Scotland) SCO	Scott Shearer	2	0	0	0	0	0	0	0	2	0
14	MF	(England) ENG	Josh Ruffels	44	5	32+5	5	1	0	1	0	4+1	0
15	FW	(England) ENG	Kane Hemmings	0	0	0	0	0	0	0	0	0	0
16	DF	(England) ENG	Robert Dickie	15	1	15	1	0	0	0	0	0	0
17	MF	(England) ENG	James Henry	46	11	32+8	10	1	0	0+1	0	3+1	1
18	MF	(England) ENG	Joe Rothwell	40	6	25+10	5	0+1	0	1	0	2+1	1
19	MF	(Spain) ESP	Xemi Fernández	13	2	4+5	1	0	0	1	1	3	0
19	DF	(England) ENG	Todd Kane	17	3	17	3	0	0	0	0	0	0
20	FW	(England) ENG	Jon Obika	40	7	20+14	5	0	0	1	1	5	1
21	DF	(Brazil) BRA	Ricardinho	38	3	28+7	3	0	0	0	0	3	0
22	DF	(England) ENG	Sam Long	0	0	0	0	0	0	0	0	0	0
24	MF	(England) ENG	Josh Ashby	1	0	0	0	0	0	0	0	0+1	0
25	DF	(England) ENG	Charlie Raglan	1	0	0	0	0	0	0	0	1	0
27	DF	(England) ENG	Alex Mowatt	32	3	19+9	2	1	0	0	0	3	1
28	FW	(Albania) ALB	Agon Mehmeti	16	1	3+10	1	0	0	0	0	1+2	0
29	DF	(England) ENG	Ashley Smith-Brown	9	0	9	0	0	0	0	0	0	0
30	DF	(England) ENG	John Mousinho	43	1	39	1	1	0	0	0	3	0
31	FW	(England) ENG	James Roberts	3	0	0+1	0	0	0	0	0	0+2	0
32	FW	(England) ENG	Isaac Buckley-Ricketts	12	0	8+3	0	0	0	0	0	1	0
34	GK	(England) ENG	Jack Stevens	0	0	0	0	0	0	0	0	0	0
35	DF	(Republic of Ireland) IRL	Canice Carroll	17	1	10+2	1	0	0	0+1	0	3+1	0
36	MF	(England) ENG	Malachi Napa	17	0	3+11	0	0	0	0	0	0+3	0
37	MF	(Grenada) GRN	Shandon Baptiste	2	0	0	0	0	0	0	0	0+2	0
39	FW	(Curaçao) CUW	Gino van Kessel	26	5	8+15	3	0	0	0	0	3	2
40	GK	(England) ENG	Manny Agboola	0	0	0	0	0	0	0	0	0	0
42	FW	(England) ENG	Owen James	1	0	0+1	0	0	0	0	0	0	0

=== Top scorers ===
As of 5 May 2018

Place	Position	Nation	Number	Name	League One	FA Cup	League Cup	FL Trophy	Total
1=	FW	(England)	9	Wes Thomas	10	0	0	1	11
1=	MF	(England)	17	James Henry	10	0	0	1	11
3=	MF	(England)	10	Jack Payne	3	0	0	4	7
3=	FW	(England)	20	Jon Obika	5	0	1	1	7
5	MF	(England)	18	Joe Rothwell	5	0	0	1	6
6=	FW	(England)	7	Robert Hall	2	0	0	3	5
6=	MF	(England)	14	Josh Ruffels	5	0	0	0	5
6=	FW	(Curaçao)	39	Gino van Kessel	3	0	0	2	5
9=	MF	(England)	27	Alex Mowatt	2	0	0	1	3
9=	MF	(England)	8	Ryan Ledson	3	0	0	0	3
9=	DF	(England)	19	Todd Kane	3	0	0	0	3
9=	DF	(Brazil)	21	Ricardinho	3	0	0	0	3
13	MF	(Spain)	19	Xemi Fernández	1	0	1	0	2
14=	DF	(England)	2	Christian Ribeiro	1	0	0	0	1
14=	DF	(England)	5	Curtis Nelson	1	0	0	0	1
14=	MF	(England)	11	Marvin Johnson	0	0	1	0	1
14=	DF	(England)	15	Robert Dickie	1	0	0	0	1
14=	FW	(Albania)	28	Agon Mehmeti	1	0	0	0	1
14=	DF	(England)	30	John Mousinho	1	0	0	0	1
14=	DF	(Republic of Ireland)	35	Canice Carroll	1	0	0	0	1
TOTALS					60	0	3	14	77

=== Disciplinary record ===
As of 5 May 2018

Number	Nation	Position	Name	League One		FA Cup		League Cup		FL Trophy		Total	
Number	Nation	Position	Name	Yellow card	Red card	Yellow card	Red card	Yellow card	Red card	Yellow card	Red card	Yellow card	Red card
1	(England)	GK	Simon Eastwood	1	0	0	0	0	0	0	0	1	0
2	(England)	DF	Christian Ribeiro	1	0	0	0	0	0	0	0	1	0
3	(Netherlands)	DF	Dwight Tiendalli	2	0	0	0	0	0	0	0	2	0
4	(England)	DF	Mike Williamson	1	0	0	0	0	0	0	0	1	0
5	(England)	DF	Curtis Nelson	1	0	0	0	1	0	0	0	2	0
6	(England)	DF	Aaron Martin	2	0	1	0	0	0	0	0	3	0
7	(England)	FW	Robert Hall	1	0	0	0	1	0	0	0	2	0
8	(England)	MF	Ryan Ledson	11	0	0	0	1	0	1	0	13	0
9	(England)	FW	Wes Thomas	3	0	1	0	0	0	0	0	4	0
10	(England)	MF	Jack Payne	1	0	0	0	0	0	0	0	1	0
11	(England)	MF	Cameron Brannagan	5	0	0	0	0	0	0	0	5	0
14	(England)	MF	Josh Ruffels	1	0	0	0	1	0	0	0	2	0
16	(England)	DF	Robert Dickie	4	0	0	0	0	0	0	0	4	0
17	(England)	MF	James Henry	3	0	0	0	0	0	0	0	3	0
18	(England)	MF	Joe Rothwell	7	0	0	0	0	0	0	0	7	0
19	(Spain)	MF	Xemi Fernández	2	0	0	0	0	0	2	0	4	0
19	(England)	DF	Todd Kane	1	0	0	0	0	0	0	0	1	0
20	(England)	FW	Jon Obika	1	0	0	0	0	0	0	0	1	0
21	(Brazil)	DF	Ricardinho	5	1	0	0	0	0	1	0	6	1
25	(England)	DF	Charlie Raglan	0	0	0	0	0	0	1	0	1	0
27	(England)	MF	Alex Mowatt	2	1	0	0	0	0	0	0	2	1
30	(England)	DF	John Mousinho	6	0	0	0	0	0	1	0	7	0
35	(Republic of Ireland)	DF	Canice Carroll	5	0	0	0	0	0	2	0	7	0
TOTALS				66	2	2	0	3	0	8	0	79	2
