= Xemi Fernández =

Spanish footballer

Xemi
Personal information
- Full name: Josep Miquel Fernández Codina
- Date of birth: 2 February 1995 (age 31)
- Place of birth: Sabadell, Spain
- Height: 1.84 m (6 ft 0 in)
- Position: Midfielder

Team information
- Current team: Ponferradina
- Number: 14

Youth career
- 2003–2009: Sant Gabriel
- 2009–2012: Damm
- 2012–2014: Cornellà

Senior career*
Years	Team	Apps	(Gls)
2013–2015	Cornellà	69	(7)
2016–2017	Barcelona B	44	(2)
2017–2018	Oxford United	9	(1)
2018	Cornellà	12	(0)
2018–2020	Lleida Esportiu	49	(9)
2020–2022	UCAM Murcia	58	(15)
2022–2024	Intercity	73	(9)
2024–2025	Antequera	30	(2)
2025–	Ponferradina	35	(5)
- * Club domestic league appearances and goals as of 25 May 2026

Josep Miquel Fernández Codina (born 2 February 1995), commonly known as Xemi, is a Spanish professional footballer who plays for Primera Federación club Ponferradina as a central or attacking midfielder.

== Club career ==
=== Early career ===
Born in Sabadell, Barcelona, Catalonia, Xemi joined UE Cornellà's youth setup in 2012, after starting out at CF Damm and CE Sant Gabriel. He made his senior debut in the 2013–14 season at fourth level.

Xemi made his professional debut on 3 September 2014, coming on in the 71st minute of a 0–0 home draw against Real Jaén for the season's Copa del Rey first round. On 29 October 2014, he appeared for 72 minutes of a 1–4 home loss against Real Madrid in the first leg of the fourth round of the domestic cup.

After appearing more regularly during the following campaign in Segunda División B, on 28 December 2015, Xemi signed with FC Barcelona B, in the same division, until 30 June 2017.

=== Oxford United ===
On 18 July 2017, after being a regular starter in the Barcelona B-side's promotion to the second level, free agent Xemi signed a three-year contract with League One side Oxford United. He made his debut against Cheltenham Town in the first round of the 2017–18 EFL Cup, scoring in the 42nd minute, though his team would go on to lose 4–3 after extra time. His league debut was as a substitute in a League One game against AFC Wimbledon on 7 October, in which he scored the third goal in a 3–0 victory. His first League One start came in an away fixture at Southend United on 25 November 2017. On 30 January 2018, Oxford United announced that he had left the club by mutual consent.

=== Cornellà and Lleida Esportiu ===
On 31 January 2018, Xemi joined Cornellà until the end of the season. On 9 July signed a two-year contract with Lleida Esportiu.

== Club statistics ==
As of 30 January 2018

Appearances and goals by club, season and competition
Club	Season	League			National Cup		League Cup		Other		Total	
Club	Season	Division	Apps	Goals	Apps	Goals	Apps	Goals	Apps	Goals	Apps	Goals
Cornellà	2013–14	Tercera División	18	1	0	0	—		—		18	1
Cornellà	2014–15	Segunda División B	33	5	4	0	—		—		37	5
Cornellà	2015–16	Segunda División B	18	1	0	0	—		—		18	1
Cornellà	Total		69	7	4	0	—		—		73	7
Barcelona B	2015–16	Segunda División B	13	0	—		—		—		13	0
Barcelona B	2016–17	Segunda División B	31	2	—		—		3 (Note: Three appearances in Segunda División B play-offs)	0	34	2
Barcelona B	Total		44	2	—		—		3	0	47	2
Oxford United	2017–18	League One	9	1	0	0	1	1	3 (Note: Appearances in the EFL Trophy)	0	13	2
Career total			122	10	4	0	1	1	3	0	133	11

== Personal life ==
Xemi studies medicine at the Autonomous University of Barcelona. His older brother and sister are both doctors.
