= John Campbell (footballer, born 1988) =

English footballer

Personal information
- Date of birth: 23 November 1988 (age 37)
- Place of birth: Newcastle, England
- Position: Striker

Team information
- Current team: Whitby Town

Youth career
- 1997–2002: Newcastle United
- 2002–2006: Manchester City

Senior career*
Years	Team	Apps	(Gls)
2009–2010	West Allotment Celtic		
2010–2011	Newcastle Benfield	?	(25)
2011	Darlington	24	(5)
2011–2012	Bedlington Terriers		
2012–2014	West Auckland Town	111	(80)
2014	Jarrow Roofing	19	(24)
2014–2015	Oxford United	3	(1)
2015	→ Torquay United (loan)	9	(2)
2015–2016	Jarrow Roofing	5	(5)
2016–?	Newton Aycliffe		
?–2017	Newcastle Benfield		
2017–	Whitby Town		
- * Club domestic league appearances and goals as of 16:01 21 July 2016 (UTC)

John Campbell (born 23 November 1988) is an English footballer who plays for Whitby Town. He is a striker.

== Career ==
A Newcastle United youth graduate, Campbell was released by the club in 2002, aged 14, with Andy Carroll being the other option. He subsequently played for Manchester City's youth setup, and was released in 2006, aged 18.

Campbell subsequently played for non-league teams, and joined Conference Premier side Darlington on 31 January 2011, after scoring 25 goals in half a season at Newcastle Benfield. He also had trials at Swindon Town in December 2010.

Campbell left the Quakers on 8 November, and signed for Bedlington Terriers. In January 2012 he moved to West Auckland Town, scoring 42 goals in the 2012–13 season.

In the 2014 summer Campbell joined Jarrow Roofing. In October, after scoring 18 goals in 14 games, he attracted the interest of several Football League clubs.

On 27 November 2014 Campbell signed a short-term deal with League Two side Oxford United. He made his professional debut on 20 December, starting in a 1–1 away draw against Hartlepool United. Eight days later he scored his first professional goal, netting his side's first in a 2–1 away win over Plymouth Argyle.

On 17 February 2015 Campbell signed for Torquay United on loan from Oxford until the end of the season. Campbell made his first appearance as a substitute versus Wrexham in the semi-final first leg of the FA Trophy, which ended in a 2–1 defeat for Torquay, and his full debut in the second leg, which Torquay lost 3–0.

In September 2017 he joined Whitby Town.

== Personal life ==
Campbell has three sons, Layton, Cory and Cassidy. The former is also a footballer, and has attracted the interest of Newcastle and Sunderland.
