= Stretford Paddock F.C. =

Association football club in England

- Full name: Stretford Paddock Football Club
- Nickname: The Paddock
- Founded: July 2020; 6 years ago
- Ground: Ewen Fields
- Manager: Stephen Howson
- League: Cheshire Association Football League
- 2023–24: Cheshire League Two, 5th
- Website: https://www.stretfordpaddockfc.com
| Home colours | Away colours | Third colours |

Stretford Paddock Football Club are an association football club based in Manchester, England.

The club's first team plays in the Cheshire Association Football League, League Two.

== Background ==
Stretford Paddock Football Club was started by Stephen Howson, who is the current CEO and first team manager. Howson started the club from his desire to practice journalism in real time, as he also runs a Manchester United F.C. fan channel in addition to his managerial duties. Howson works as a co-presenter for the YouTube channel Stretford Paddock, which is where the club gets its name. Howson has done journalism work for Manchester United, as well as other football related media sources such as Soccer AM, BBC Sport, BT Sport, and Sky Sports. He occasionally co-presents "Vibe with Five" with Rio Ferdinand.

== History ==
Stretford Paddock was founded in 2020. As of 1 June 2022 the club has been fan owned.

First Silverware

On Saturday 8 July 2023, Stretford Paddock faced Droylsden FC in a significant match that marked Droylsden's return to football after three years of inactivity. The game, filled with anticipation, witnessed a delayed kickoff due to unexpected crowd congestion. In a dramatic turn of events, Stretford Paddock secured victory in a penalty shootout, lifting the Tony Downes Memorial Cup. This win, against a team that once held a notable position in the Northern Premier League, added the first silverware to Stretford Paddock's story.

Biggest League Win

Stretford Paddock FC recorded their largest league victory on 9 September 2023, when they defeated Wigan Town with a score of 10–0. This result stands out as the club's most significant win in league competition to date.

== Club Colours ==
The clubs colours are red and white with black socks. This is an homage to Manchester United, as the club is created by supporters of Manchester United. In 2021 the club announced a four-year partnership with Puma to supply kits.

== Home ground ==
Stretford Paddock have been somewhat nomadic in regards to a home ground, having played home games at Droylsden FC's Butcher's Arms Ground, Flixton's Valley Road Stadium, Wright Robinson College, and the Manchester Enterprise Academy. Their current home ground is at Hyde United.
