= 2017–18 Watford F.C. season =

English football team season

Watford
2017–18 season
- Owner: Gino Pozzo
- Chairman: Scott Duxbury
- Manager: Marco Silva (until 21 January); Javi Gracia (from 21 January)
- Stadium: Vicarage Road
- Premier League: 14th
- FA Cup: Fourth round (eliminated by Southampton)
- EFL Cup: Second round (eliminated by Bristol City)
- Top goalscorer: League: Abdoulaye Doucouré (7); All: Abdoulaye Doucouré (7)
Home colours	Away colours

The 2017–18 season was the 120th season in the history of Watford and their third consecutive season in the Premier League. They also participated in the FA Cup and EFL Cup.

The season covered the period from 1 July 2017 to 30 June 2018.

Marco Silva replaced Walter Mazzarri despite resigning as the manager at Hull City who were relegated last season, but after just 26 games in charge, he was sacked and was immediately replaced by Javi Gracia.

== Squad ==
=== First team squad ===
As of 12 July 2018

Note: Flags indicate national team as defined under FIFA eligibility rules; some limited exceptions apply. Players may hold more than one non-FIFA nationality.

No.	Pos.	Nation	Player
1	GK	BRA	Heurelho Gomes
2	DF	NED	Daryl Janmaat
3	DF	URU	Miguel Britos
4	DF	FRA	Younès Kaboul
5	DF	AUT	Sebastian Prödl
6	DF	JAM	Adrian Mariappa
7	FW	ESP	Gerard Deulofeu
8	MF	ENG	Tom Cleverley
9	FW	ENG	Troy Deeney (captain)
11	FW	BRA	Richarlison
12	MF	GAB	Didier Ndong (on loan from Sunderland)
13	DF	MLI	Molla Wagué (on loan from Udinese)
14	MF	ENG	Nathaniel Chalobah
15	DF	NIR	Craig Cathcart
16	MF	FRA	Abdoulaye Doucouré
17	FW	ENG	Jerome Sinclair

No.	Pos.	Nation	Player
18	FW	ENG	Andre Gray
19	MF	ENG	Will Hughes
20	MF	BEL	Dodi Lukebakio
21	DF	ESP	Kiko Femenía
22	DF	NED	Marvin Zeegelaar
25	DF	GRE	José Holebas
27	DF	BEL	Christian Kabasele
28	MF	PER	André Carrillo (on loan from Benfica)
29	MF	FRA	Étienne Capoue
30	GK	GRE	Orestis Karnezis (on loan from Udinese)
31	DF	IRL	Tommie Hoban
33	FW	ITA	Stefano Okaka
35	GK	AUT	Daniel Bachmann
37	MF	ARG	Roberto Pereyra

== Transfers ==
=== Transfers in ===
Date	Position	Nationality	Player	From	Fee	Ref.
1 July 2017	GK	(Austria)	Daniel Bachmann	Stoke City	Free	
1 July 2017	CM	(England)	Tom Cleverley	Everton	Undisclosed	
1 July 2017	RB	(Spain)	Kiko Femenía	Alavés	Free	
1 July 2017	CM	(England)	Will Hughes	Derby County	£8,000,000	
8 July 2017	ST	(England)	Harvey Bradbury	Portsmouth	Free	
8 July 2017	GK	(England)	Sam Howes	West Ham United	Free	
14 July 2017	CM	(England)	Nathaniel Chalobah	Chelsea	£5,000,000	
8 August 2017	FW	(Brazil)	Richarlison	Fluminense	£11,160,000	
9 August 2017	ST	(England)	Andre Gray	Burnley	Undisclosed	
31 August 2017	LB	(Netherlands)	Marvin Zeegelaar	Sporting CP	Undisclosed	

=== Loans in ===
Date	Position	Nationality	Player	From	End date	Ref.
24 August 2017	RW	(Peru)	André Carrillo	Benfica	30 June 2018	
31 August 2017	GK	(Greece)	Orestis Karnezis	Udinese	30 June 2018	
31 August 2017	CB	(Mali)	Molla Wagué	Udinese	30 June 2018	
29 January 2018	FW	(Spain)	Gerard Deulofeu	Barcelona	30 June 2018	

=== Transfers out ===
Date	Position	Nationality	Player	To	Fee	Ref.
1 July 2017	CF	(Nigeria)	Ola Adeyemo	Valdres	Released	(Note: Ola Adeyemo joined Valdres FK following his release.)
1 July 2017	GK	(England)	Charlie Bannister	Free agent	Released	
1 July 2017	GK	(Republic of Ireland)	Rene Gilmartin	Colchester United	Released	(Note: Rene Gilmartin joined Colchester United following his release.)
1 July 2017	CF	(Nigeria)	Ogo Obi	Hemel Hempstead Town	Released	
1 July 2017	CM	(Wales)	Rhyle Ovenden	Free agent	Released	
1 July 2017	CF	(Sweden)	Mathias Ranégie	BK Häcken	Released	(Note: Mathias Ranégie joined BK Häcken following his release.)
11 July 2017	DM	(Spain)	Mario Suárez	Guizhou Hengfeng Zhicheng	Undisclosed	
31 July 2017	RW	(Netherlands)	Steven Berghuis	Feyenoord	Undisclosed	
4 August 2017	RB	(Ecuador)	Juan Carlos Paredes	Emelec	Free	
15 August 2017	GK	(Lithuania)	Giedrius Arlauskis	CFR Cluj	Mutual consent	(Note: Giedrius Arlauskis joined CFR Cluj following his departure.)
16 August 2017	DM	(Switzerland)	Valon Behrami	Udinese	Undisclosed	

=== Loans out ===
Date	Position	Nationality	Player	To	End date	Ref.
6 July 2017	DM	(England)	Dennon Lewis	Crawley Town	31 December 2017	
27 July 2017	CF	(Belgium)	Obbi Oularé	Antwerp	30 June 2018	
1 September 2017	LW	(Morocco)	Nordin Amrabat	Leganés	30 June 2018	
1 September 2017	GK	(Romania)	Costel Pantilimon	Deportivo La Coruña	30 June 2018	
2 October 2017	SS	(Argentina)	Mauro Zárate	Al-Nasr	30 June 2018	

== Friendlies ==
Watford played the following pre-season friendlies.

15 July 2017	AFC Wimbledon	3–2	Watford	Kingston upon Thames
15:00 BST	McDonald 46', 49'; Egan 90'	Report	Watson 57'; Berghuis 77'	Stadium: Kingsmeadow; Attendance: 2,101

18 July 2017	Viktoria Plzeň	0–1	Watford	Kufstein, Austria
CEST		Report	Okaka 80'

22 July 2017	Eibar	0–1	Watford	Kufstein, Austria
16:00 CEST		Report	Capoue 78'

26 July 2017	Watford	1–2	Rangers	London Colney
17:00 BST	Okaka 59'	Report	Candeias 42'; Waghorn 90'	Stadium: UCL Sports Ground; Attendance: 0

29 July 2017	Aston Villa	0–0	Watford	Aston
15:00 BST		Report		Stadium: Villa Park

5 August 2017	Watford	0–0	Real Sociedad	Watford
15:00 BST				Stadium: Vicarage Road

1 September 2017	Watford	4–2	Millwall	London Colney
13:00 BST	Gray; Capoue; Success x2	Report		Stadium: UCL Sports Ground

== Competitions ==
=== Premier League ===
==== League table ====
Pos	Team	Pld	W	D	L	GF	GA	GD	Pts
12	Bournemouth	38	11	11	16	45	61	−16	44
13	West Ham United	38	10	12	16	48	68	−20	42
14	Watford	38	11	8	19	44	64	−20	41
15	Brighton & Hove Albion	38	9	13	16	34	54	−20	40
16	Huddersfield Town	38	9	10	19	28	58	−30	37

Source: Premier League
Rules for classification: 1) Points; 2) Goal difference; 3) Goals scored. 4) Play-offs (only if needed to decide champion, teams for relegation or teams for UEFA competitions).

==== Results summary ====
Overall								Home						Away					
Pld	W	D	L	GF	GA	GD	Pts	W	D	L	GF	GA	GD	W	D	L	GF	GA	GD
38	11	8	19	44	64	−20	41	7	6	6	27	31	−4	4	2	13	17	33	−16

Source: Premier League

==== Results by matchday ====
Matchday	1	2	3	4	5	6	7	8	9	10	11	12	13	14	15	16	17	18	19	20	21	22	23	24	25	26	27	28	29	30	31	32	33	34	35	36	37	38
Ground	H	A	H	A	H	A	A	H	A	H	A	H	A	H	H	A	A	H	A	H	H	A	H	A	A	H	A	H	H	A	A	H	H	A	H	A	H	A
Result	D	W	D	W	L	W	D	W	L	L	L	W	W	L	D	L	L	L	L	W	L	L	D	L	D	W	L	W	W	L	L	D	L	L	D	L	W	L
Position	10	3	7	4	11	6	5	4	5	7	9	8	8	8	8	9	9	9	10	10	10	10	10	10	11	11	11	10	9	10	11	11	12	12	12	13	13	14

Source: 11v11
A = Away; H = Home; W = Win; D = Draw; L = Loss

==== Matches ====
On 14 June 2017, Watford's league season fixtures were announced.

12 August 2017 1	Watford	3–3	Liverpool	Watford
12:30 BST	Okaka 8'; Doucouré 32'; Britos 90+4'	Report	Mané 29', (yellow card) 37'; Firmino 55' (pen.); Salah 57'; Alexander-Arnold (yellow card) 62'; Mignolet (yellow card) 88'	Stadium: Vicarage Road; Attendance: 20,407; Referee: Anthony Taylor

19 August 2017 2	Bournemouth	0–2	Watford	Boscombe
15:00 BST	S. Cook (yellow card) 61'	Report	Britos (yellow card) 27'; Gray (yellow card) 58'; Chalobah (yellow card) 63'; Richarlison 73'; Capoue 86'	Stadium: Dean Court; Attendance: 10,501; Referee: Roger East

26 August 2017 3	Watford	0–0	Brighton & Hove Albion	Watford
15:00 BST	Britos (red card) 24'	Report	Bruno (yellow card) 17'	Stadium: Vicarage Road Stadium; Attendance: 20,181; Referee: Graham Scott

9 September 2017 4	Southampton	0–2	Watford	Southampton
15:00 BST		Report	Doucouré 38'; Janmaat 66'	Stadium: St Mary's Stadium; Attendance: 31,435; Referee: Lee Probert

16 September 2017 5	Watford	0–6	Manchester City	Watford
15:00 BST	Holebas (yellow card) 29'; Doucouré (yellow card) 40'	Report	Agüero 27', 31', 81'; Gabriel Jesus 38'; Otamendi 63'; Sterling 89' (pen.)	Stadium: Vicarage Road; Attendance: 20,305; Referee: Anthony Taylor

23 September 2017 6	Swansea City	1–2	Watford	Swansea
15:00 BST	Abraham 56'	Report	Gray 13'; Richarlison 90'	Stadium: Liberty Stadium; Attendance: 20,372; Referee: Lee Mason

30 September 2017 7	West Bromwich Albion	2–2	Watford	West Bromwich
15:00 BST	Rondón 18'; Evans 21', (yellow card) 88'; Livermore (yellow card) 87'; McClean (yellow card) 90'	Report	Doucouré 37'; Richarlison 90+5'	Stadium: The Hawthorns; Attendance: 24,606; Referee: Michael Oliver

14 October 2017 8	Watford	2–1	Arsenal	Watford
17:30 BST	Kabasele (yellow card) 64'; Deeney 71' (pen.); Cleverley 90+2'	Report	Mertesacker 39'	Stadium: Vicarage Road; Attendance: 20,384; Referee: Neil Swarbrick

21 October 2017 9	Chelsea	4–2	Watford	Fulham
12:30 BST	Pedro 12'; Rüdiger (yellow card) 23'; Morata (yellow card) 56'; Batshuayi 71', 90+5'; Azpilicueta 87'	Report	Holebas (yellow card) 12'; Mariappa (yellow card) 19'; Doucoure 45+2'; Pereyra 49'; Femenía (yellow card) 78'	Stadium: Stamford Bridge; Attendance: 41,467; Referee: Jon Moss

28 October 2017 10	Watford	0–1	Stoke City	Watford
15:00 BST	Femenía (yellow card) 57'; Richarlison (yellow card) 76'; Doucouré (yellow card) 87'; Deeney (yellow card) 90+5'	Report	Fletcher 16'; Choupo-Moting (yellow card) 62'; Shaqiri (yellow card) 85'; Diouf (yellow card) 87'; Allen (yellow card) 90+5'	Stadium: Vicarage Road; Attendance: 20,087; Referee: Michael Oliver

5 November 2017 11	Everton	3–2	Watford	Liverpool
16:30 GMT	Niasse 67'; Calvert-Lewin 74'; Baines 90+1' (pen.)	Report	Richarlison 46'; Kabasele 64'; Britos (yellow card) 69'; Holebas (yellow card) 90'; Cleverley (penalty missed) 90+11'	Stadium: Goodison Park; Attendance: 38,609; Referee: Graham Scott

19 November 2017 12	Watford	2–0	West Ham United	Watford
16:00 GMT	Hughes 11'; Britos (yellow card) 29'; Richarlison 64'	Report	Carroll (yellow card) 28'; Arnautović (yellow card) 35'; Obiang (yellow card) 41'; Noble (yellow card) 83'	Stadium: Vicarage Road; Attendance: 20,018; Referee: Andre Marriner

25 November 2017 13	Newcastle United	0–3	Watford	Newcastle Upon Tyne
15:00 GMT	Shelvey (yellow card) 15'	Report	Hughes 19'; Zeegelaar (yellow card) 24'; Yedlin 45+1' (o.g.); Gray 62'; Prödl (yellow card) 90+2'	Stadium: St James' Park; Attendance: 52,188; Referee: Chris Kavanagh

28 November 2017 14	Watford	2–4	Manchester United	Watford
20:00 GMT	Doucouré (yellow card) 24', (goal) 84'; Mariappa (yellow card) 41'; Deeney 77' (pen.)	Report	Young 19', 25'; Martial 32'; Rojo (yellow card) 38'; Lingard 86'	Stadium: Vicarage Road; Attendance: 20,552; Referee: Jon Moss

2 December 2017 15	Watford	1–1	Tottenham Hotspur	Watford
15:00 GMT	Kabasele 13'	Report	Son 25'	Stadium: Vicarage Road; Attendance: 20,278; Referee: Martin Atkinson

9 December 2017 16	Burnley	1–0	Watford	Burnley
15:00 GMT	Arfield 45'; Bardsley (yellow card) 86'	Report	Zeegelaar (red card) 39'	Stadium: Turf Moor; Attendance: 19,479; Referee: Lee Probert

12 December 2017 17	Crystal Palace	2–1	Watford	Selhurst
20:00 GMT	Milivojević (yellow card) 63'; Van Aanholt (yellow card) 85'; Sako 89'; McArthur 90+1'	Report	Janmaat 3'; Cleverley (yellow card) 78' (yellow-red card) 87'; Prödl (yellow card) 80'; Pereyra (yellow card) 90+1'	Stadium: Selhurst Park; Attendance: 23,566; Referee: Lee Mason

16 December 2017 18	Watford	1–4	Huddersfield Town	Watford
15:00 GMT	Deeney (red card) 33'; Doucouré 68'	Report	Kachunga 6'; Mooy 23', 89' (pen.); Depoitre 50'; Hogg (yellow card) 37' (yellow-red card) 61'	Stadium: Vicarage Road; Attendance: 20,026; Referee: Michael Oliver

23 December 2017 19	Brighton & Hove Albion	1–0	Watford	Falmer
15:00 GMT	Groß 64'	Report		Stadium: Falmer Stadium; Attendance: 30,473; Referee: Paul Tierney

26 December 2017 20	Watford	2–1	Leicester City	Watford
15:00 GMT	Watson (yellow card) 8'; Kabasele (yellow card) 13'; Wagué 45'; Schmeichel 65' (o.g.); Zeegelaar (yellow card) 88'	Report	Maguire (yellow card) 4'; Dragović (yellow card) 30'; Mahrez 37'; King (yellow card) 81'	Stadium: Vicarage Road; Attendance: 20,308; Referee: Chris Kavanagh

30 December 2017 21	Watford	1–2	Swansea City	Watford
15:00 GMT	Carrillo 11', (yellow card) 30'; Doucouré (yellow card) 80'; Prödl (yellow card) 82'; Zeegelaar (yellow card) 89'	Report	Fernández (yellow card) 3'; Carroll (yellow card) 34'; Ayew 86'; Narsingh 90'	Stadium: Vicarage Road; Attendance: 20,002; Referee: Martin Atkinson

2 January 2018 22	Manchester City	3–1	Watford	Manchester
20:00 GMT	Sterling 1'; Kabasele 13' (o.g.); D. Silva (yellow card) 24'; Agüero 63'	Report	Gray 82'; Pereyra (yellow card) 83'	Stadium: City of Manchester Stadium; Attendance: 53,556; Referee: Lee Mason

13 January 2018 23	Watford	2–2	Southampton	Watford
15:00 GMT	Gray 58'; Doucouré 90'	Report	Ward-Prowse 20', 44'; Højbjerg (yellow card) 31'; Romeu (yellow card) 79'; McCarthy (yellow card) 81'; Tadić (yellow card) 87'; Cédric (yellow card) 90'	Stadium: Vicarage Road; Attendance: 20,018; Referee: Roger East

20 January 2018 24	Leicester City	2–0	Watford	Leicester
15:00 GMT	Vardy 39' (pen.); Mahrez 90+1'	Report		Stadium: King Power Stadium; Attendance: 31,891; Referee: Lee Probert

31 January 2018 25	Stoke City	0–0	Watford	Stoke-on-Trent
20:00 GMT	Adam (yellow card) 21'; Bauer (yellow card) 35'; Diouf (yellow card) 52'; Pieters (yellow card) 59'	Report	Kabasele (yellow card) 18'; Holebas (yellow card) 47'; Doucouré (yellow card) 90'	Stadium: Bet365 Stadium; Attendance: 27,458; Referee: Jon Moss

5 February 2018 26	Watford	4–1	Chelsea	Watford
20:00 GMT	Deeney 42' (pen.); Richarlison (yellow card) 45'; Prödl (yellow card) 50'; Janmaat 84'; Deulofeu 88'; Pereyra 90+1'	Report	Bakayoko (yellow card) 25' (yellow-red card) 30'; David Luiz (yellow card) 58'; Fàbregas (yellow card) 62'; Hazard 82'	Stadium: Vicarage Road; Attendance: 20,157; Referee: Mike Dean

10 February 2018 27	West Ham United	2–0	Watford	Stratford, London
15:00 GMT	Hernández 38'; Zabaleta (yellow card) 44'; Arnautović 78'	Report	Prödl (yellow card) 90'	Stadium: London Stadium; Attendance: 56,197; Referee: Graham Scott

24 February 2018 28	Watford	1–0	Everton	Watford
17:30 GMT	Capoue (yellow card) 53'; Deeney 79'; Janmaat (yellow card) 88'; Carrillo (yellow card) 90+2'	Report	Gueye (yellow card) 64'	Stadium: Vicarage Road; Attendance: 20,430; Referee: Anthony Taylor

3 March 2018 29	Watford	1–0	West Bromwich Albion	Watford
15:00 GMT	Capoue (yellow card) 25'; Mariappa (yellow card) 72'; Deeney 77'	Report		Stadium: Vicarage Road; Attendance: 20,022; Referee: Paul Tierney

11 March 2018 30	Arsenal	3–0	Watford	Holloway, London
13:30 GMT	Mustafi 8', (yellow card) 55'; Aubameyang 59'; Mkhitaryan 77'; Xhaka (yellow card) 90'	Report	Deeney (penalty missed) 62'; Holebas (yellow card) 66'	Stadium: Emirates Stadium; Attendance: 59,131; Referee: Martin Atkinson

17 March 2018 31	Liverpool	5–0	Watford	Liverpool
17:30 GMT	Salah 4', 43', 77', 85'; Firmino 49'; Gomez (yellow card) 52'	Report		Stadium: Anfield; Attendance: 53,287; Referee: Anthony Taylor

31 March 2018 32	Watford	2–2	Bournemouth	Watford
15:00 BST	Femenía 13'; Holebas (yellow card) 42'; Pereyra 49'; Prödl (yellow card) 56'; Doucouré (yellow card) 78'; Okaka (yellow card) 90'	Report	King 43'; Defoe 90+2'	Stadium: Vicarage Road; Attendance: 20,393; Referee: Andrew Madley

7 April 2018 33	Watford	1–2	Burnley	Watford
15:00 BST	Doucouré (yellow card) 56'; Pereyra 61'; Okaka (yellow card) 90+3'	Report	Nkoudou (yellow card) 33'; Vokes 70'; Cork 73'; Lowton (yellow card) 90+1'	Stadium: Vicarage Road; Attendance: 20,044; Referee: Paul Tierney

14 April 2018 34	Huddersfield Town	1–0	Watford	Huddersfield
15:00 GMT	Jørgensen (yellow card) 45'; Pritchard (yellow card) 73'; Ince 90+1'	Report	Janmaat (yellow card) 20'; Pereyra (yellow card) 33'	Stadium: John Smith's Stadium; Attendance: 23,961; Referee: Craig Pawson

21 April 2018 35	Watford	0–0	Crystal Palace	Watford
15:00 BST	Doucouré (yellow card) 29'; Mariappa (yellow card) 60'; Cathcart (yellow card) 89'	Report	Ward (yellow card) 21'; Van Aanholt (yellow card) 45'; Zaha (yellow card) 64'; Loftus-Cheek (yellow card) 78'; Tomkins (yellow card) 88'	Stadium: Vicarage Road; Attendance: 20,041; Referee: Chris Kavanagh

30 April 2018 36	Tottenham Hotspur	2–0	Watford	Wembley
20:00 BST	Alli 16'; Kane 48'; Wanyama (yellow card) 64'	Report		Stadium: Wembley Stadium; Attendance: 52,675; Referee: Michael Oliver

5 May 2018 37	Watford	2–1	Newcastle United	Watford
15:00 BST	Pereyra 2'; Gray 28'; Deeney (penalty missed) 39'; Kabasele (yellow card) 58'; Holebas (yellow card) 72'	Report	Pérez (yellow card) 42', (goal) 55'	Stadium: Vicarage Road; Attendance: 20,375; Referee: Roger East

13 May 2018 38	Manchester United	1–0	Watford	Manchester
15:00 BST	Rojo (yellow card) 9'; Rashford 34'; Young (yellow card) 58'; McTominay (yellow card) 68'; Shaw (yellow card) 90+1'	Report		Stadium: Old Trafford; Attendance: 75,049; Referee: Lee Mason

=== FA Cup ===
Watford entered the competition in the third round and were handed a home tie against Bristol City.

6 January 2018 Third round	Watford	3–0	Bristol City	Watford
15:00 GMT	Kabasele (yellow card) 30'; Carrillo 37'; Deeney 57'; Capoue 85'	Report		Stadium: Vicarage Road; Attendance: 13,269; Referee: Craig Pawson

27 January 2018 Fourth round	Southampton	1–0	Watford	Southampton
15:00 GMT	Stephens 4'; Cédric (yellow card) 62'	Report	Watson (yellow card) 61'	Stadium: St Mary's Stadium; Attendance: 25,195; Referee: Bobby Madley

=== EFL Cup ===
Watford entered the EFL Cup in the second round and were drawn at home to Bristol City.

22 August 2017 Second round	Watford	2–3	Bristol City	Watford
19:45 BST	Capoue (yellow card) 35', (goal) 47'; Holebas (yellow card) 52' (yellow-red card) 88'; Mariappa 90+5'	Report	Hinds 59'; Reid 67'; Eliasson 90+3'	Stadium: Vicarage Road; Attendance: 9,003; Referee: Tim Robinson

== Statistics ==
=== Appearances and goals ===
Last updated on 8 May 2018.

No.	Pos	Nat	Player	Total		Premier League		EFL Cup		FA Cup	
No.	Pos	Nat	Player	Apps	Goals	Apps	Goals	Apps	Goals	Apps	Goals
Goalkeepers
1	GK	(Brazil) BRA	Heurelho Gomes	26	0	24	0	1	0	1	0
30	GK	(Greece) GRE	Orestis Karnezis	16	0	14+1	0	0	0	1	0
35	GK	(Austria) AUT	Daniel Bachmann	0	0	0	0	0	0	0	0
Defenders
2	DF	(Netherlands) NED	Daryl Janmaat	25	3	21+2	3	0	0	2	0
3	DF	(Uruguay) URU	Miguel Britos	12	1	10+2	1	0	0	0	0
4	DF	(France) FRA	Younès Kaboul	3	0	2	0	1	0	0	0
5	DF	(Austria) AUT	Sebastian Prödl	21	0	17+4	0	0	0	0	0
6	DF	(Jamaica) JAM	Adrian Mariappa	30	1	24+4	0	1	1	1	0
13	DF	(Mali) MLI	Molla Wagué	7	1	5+1	1	0	0	1	0
15	DF	(Northern Ireland) NIR	Craig Cathcart	7	0	5+2	0	0	0	0	0
21	DF	(Spain) ESP	Kiko Femenía	23	1	19+4	1	0	0	0	0
22	DF	(Netherlands) NED	Marvin Zeegelaar	13	0	12	0	0	0	1	0
25	DF	(Greece) GRE	José Holebas	31	0	26+2	0	1	0	1+1	0
27	DF	(Belgium) BEL	Christian Kabasele	31	2	27+1	2	1	0	2	0
31	DF	(Republic of Ireland) IRL	Tommie Hoban	0	0	0	0	0	0	0	0
Midfielders
8	MF	(England) ENG	Tom Cleverley	25	1	22+1	1	0+1	0	1	0
14	MF	(England) ENG	Nathaniel Chalobah	6	0	5+1	0	0	0	0	0
16	MF	(France) FRA	Abdoulaye Doucouré	39	7	37	7	0	0	2	0
19	MF	(England) ENG	Will Hughes	16	2	11+4	2	1	0	0	0
20	MF	(Belgium) BEL	Dodi Lukebakio	1	0	0+1	0	0	0	0	0
29	MF	(France) FRA	Étienne Capoue	26	3	18+5	1	1	1	2	1
37	MF	(Argentina) ARG	Roberto Pereyra	34	5	18+14	5	0	0	1+1	0
Forwards
7	FW	(Spain) ESP	Gerard Deulofeu	7	1	5+2	1	0	0	0	0
9	FW	(England) ENG	Troy Deeney	31	6	20+9	5	1	0	1	1
11	FW	(Brazil) BRA	Richarlison	41	5	32+6	5	1	0	1+1	0
17	FW	(England) ENG	Jerome Sinclair	5	0	0+4	0	0	0	0+1	0
18	FW	(England) ENG	Andre Gray	33	5	16+15	5	0+1	0	1	0
28	FW	(Peru) PER	André Carrillo	30	2	16+12	1	0	0	2	1
33	FW	(Italy) ITA	Stefano Okaka	16	1	3+12	1	0	0	0+1	0
Players who have made an appearance or had a squad number this season but have left the club
7	MF	(Morocco) MAR	Nordin Amrabat	4	0	3	0	1	0	0	0
10	FW	(Nigeria) NGA	Isaac Success	1	0	0	0	0+1	0	0	0
20	FW	(Argentina) ARG	Mauro Zárate	0	0	0	0	0	0	0	0
23	MF	(England) ENG	Ben Watson	11	0	6+2	0	1	0	1+1	0
30	GK	(Romania) ROU	Costel Pantilimon	0	0	0	0	0	0	0	0

=== Cards ===
Accounts for all competitions. Last updated on 18 December 2017.

No.	Pos.	Player	Yellow card	Red card
2	DF	(Netherlands) Daryl Janmaat	1	0
3	DF	(Uruguay) Miguel Britos	3	1
5	DF	(Austria) Sebastian Prödl	1	0
6	DF	(Jamaica) Adrian Mariappa	2	0
8	MF	(England) Tom Cleverley	1	1
9	FW	(England) Troy Deeney	1	1
11	MF	(Brazil) Richarlison	3	0
14	MF	(England) Nathaniel Chalobah	1	0
16	MF	(Belgium) Abdoulaye Doucouré	5	0
18	FW	(England) Andre Gray	1	0
21	DF	(Spain) Kiko Femenía	2	0
22	DF	(Netherlands) Marvin Zeegelaar	2	1
25	DF	(Greece) José Holebas	3	0
27	DF	(Belgium) Christian Kabasele	2	0
29	MF	(France) Étienne Capoue	1	0
37	MF	(Argentina) Roberto Pereyra	1	0

=== Clean sheets ===
Last updated on 18 December 2017.

No.	Pos.	Player	Matches played	Premier League	EFL Cup	FA Cup	Total
1	(Brazil)	Heurelho Gomes	19	5	0	0	5
30	(Greece)	Orestis Karnezis	1	0	0	0	0
35	(Austria)	Daniel Bachmann	0	0	0	0	0
Totals				5	0	0	5
