= Jerome Sinclair =

English footballer (born 1996)

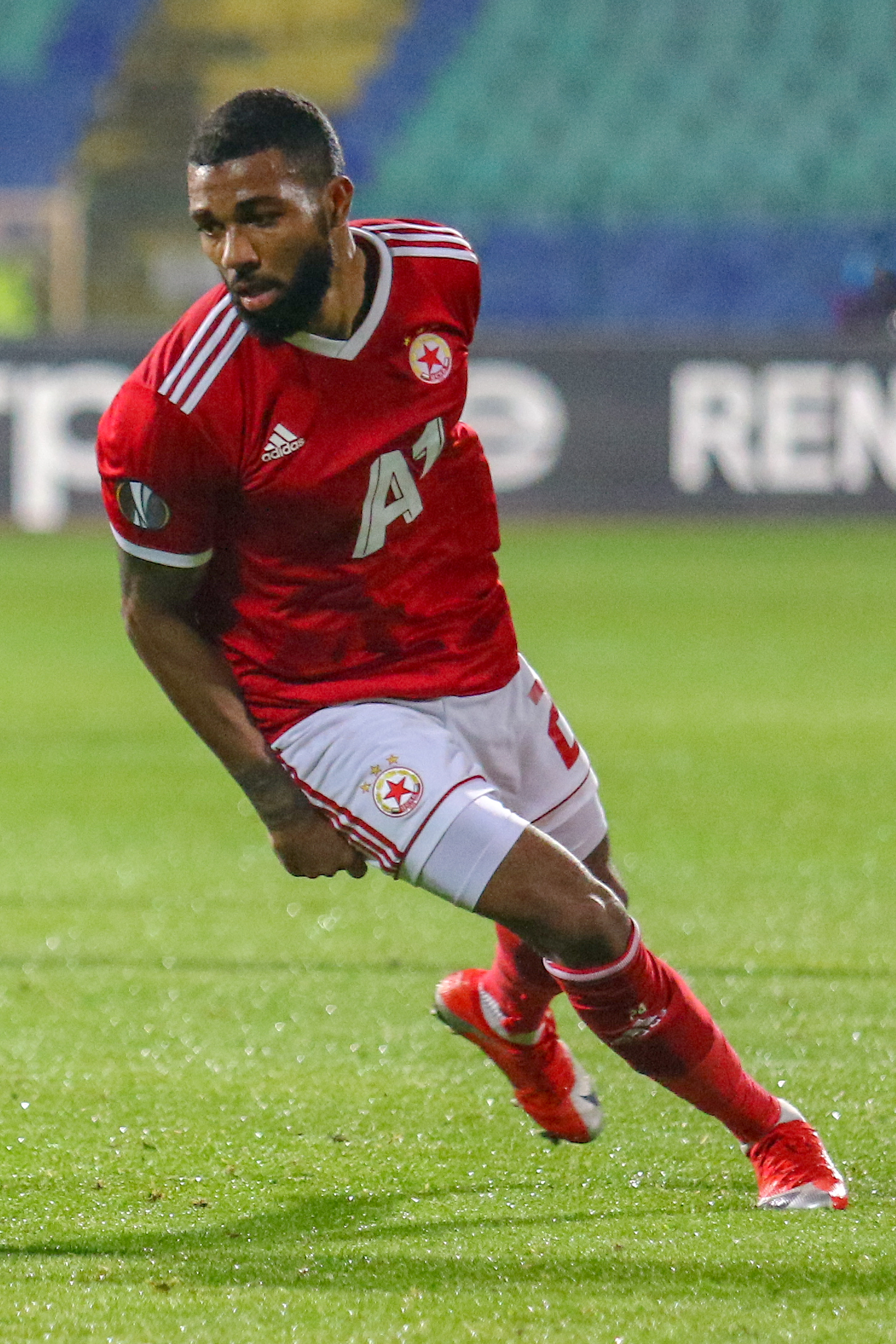
- Sinclair playing for CSKA in 2020

Personal information
- Full name: Jerome Terence Sinclair
- Date of birth: 20 September 1996 (age 30)
- Place of birth: Birmingham, England
- Height: 5 ft 11 in (1.81 m)
- Position: Forward

Youth career
- 2006–2011: West Bromwich Albion
- 2011–2012: Liverpool

Senior career*
Years	Team	Apps	(Gls)
2012–2016	Liverpool	2	(0)
2015	→ Wigan Athletic (loan)	1	(0)
2016–2021	Watford	9	(0)
2017	→ Birmingham City (loan)	5	(0)
2018	→ Sunderland (loan)	13	(1)
2019	→ Oxford United (loan)	16	(4)
2019–2020	→ VVV-Venlo (loan)	23	(0)
2020–2021	→ CSKA Sofia (loan)	18	(1)
Total		87	(6)

International career
2011–2012	England U16	5	(3)
2012	England U17	5	(1)
- * Club domestic league appearances and goals

Jerome Terence Sinclair (born 20 September 1996) is an English former professional footballer who played as a forward. He represented England up to under-17 level.

Jerome spent his youth at West Bromwich Albion and Liverpool, making his senior debut for the latter at the age of 16 years and 6 days in 2012, their youngest player of all time. He went on to make four further appearances for Liverpool after a brief loan spell at Wigan Athletic where he appeared just once. He signed for Watford in July 2016 for a fee of £4 million. He spent the second half of the 2016–17 season on loan to Championship club Birmingham City and the following season on loan at Sunderland and then to Oxford United. He then had loan spells abroad, with VVV-Venlo and CSKA Sofia before leaving Watford when his contract expired at the end of the 2020–21 season. He now plays for VZNFC in the Baller League.

== Early life ==
Sinclair was born in Dudley Road Hospital, Birmingham, and raised in the Quinton district. He began playing organised football as a seven-year-old with Phoenix United, part of a scheme designed to use sport to keep youngsters off the streets and promote positive values. He was spotted while playing for Phoenix United, invited to a trial with West Bromwich Albion, and joined that club as a schoolboy at the age of eight. As a boy, he supported Arsenal and idolised Thierry Henry. When Sinclair joined Liverpool's youth academy, his father moved to Liverpool with him, while his mother, sister and four brothers remained at home in Birmingham. While with West Brom, he had attended Sandwell Academy; as customary with Liverpool's academy recruits, he continued his education at Rainhill High School in St Helens. He got good grades in his GCSEs, and went on to study for an A level in business studies.

== Club career ==
=== Liverpool ===
==== Academy ====
Liverpool signed Sinclair as a 14-year-old from the West Bromwich Albion youth academy in the summer of 2011. The Liverpool staff compared him to Raheem Sterling. He spent most of the 2011–12 season with the Under-16s before coach Mike Marsh gave him a run of four games with the Under-18s at the end of the season. He impressed greatly in those games, though he failed to find the back of the net. On 14 July 2012, Sinclair came off the bench to score a hat-trick against Exeter City in an Under-18s pre-season friendly. In all, Sinclair netted eight goals in the six Under-18s pre-season friendly games in the run up to the 2012–13 Academy Under-18s season. He went on to score his first competitive goal for the Under-18s on 25 August 2012, hitting a brace in a 3–3 draw with Crystal Palace.

==== Reserves and first-team debut ====
While still only 15, Sinclair was called up to Rodolfo Borrell's NextGen Series side for the away match with defending champions Inter Milan in September 2012, after first-team manager Brendan Rodgers included a number of young players in his Europa League squad. He started the match and performed well, winning a penalty that Krisztián Adorján converted and going close himself on more than one occasion. Rodgers called Sinclair up to the first team for the League Cup third-round tie away to his boyhood club, West Bromwich Albion, on 26 September. At the age of 16 years and 6 days, he came off the bench in the 81st minute to replace Samed Yeşil in the 2–1 win at The Hawthorns, thus breaking Jack Robinson's record as Liverpool's youngest ever player. For the remainder of the 2012–13 season Sinclair continued to play for Liverpool U18s, but his 2013–14 season was disrupted by injury.

Up to the beginning of March 2015, Sinclair scored 22 goals for Liverpool youth teams at various levels, including 6 goals in 7 UEFA Youth League games as well as an impressive finish against Manchester United U21, beating Víctor Valdés at his near post, and a solo effort against Chelsea U21. He was one of several youngsters to travel to a Europa League tie against Beşiktaş in February, but was not included in the matchday squad as Liverpool were eliminated on penalties.

On 16 March 2015, Sinclair was loaned to Championship side Wigan Athletic, where he linked up with academy teammate Sheyi Ojo. The next day, he made his Football League debut in what proved to be his only Wigan appearance, replacing Marc-Antoine Fortuné for the final eight minutes of a 2–0 loss to Watford at the DW Stadium. On returning to Liverpool, Sinclair made his Premier League debut as a 68th-minute substitute for Rickie Lambert in a 1–1 draw away to champions Chelsea on 10 May.

On his first appearance of the 2015–16 season, away to Exeter City in the FA Cup on 8 January 2016, Sinclair scored his first senior goal for Liverpool in a 2–2 draw. Ten days later he confirmed that he would leave Liverpool at the end of the season, suggesting that he wanted to play in Spain. In April, an offer from AFC Bournemouth of £4 million plus add-ons was accepted by the club but rejected by the player.

=== Watford ===
In the January 2016 transfer window, Liverpool had rejected an offer of £1.5 million for Sinclair from Premier League club Watford. On 21 May, Sinclair agreed to join that club when his current contract expired. Because Sinclair was aged under 24, Liverpool were due a developmental fee; the clubs settled on £4 million, and Sinclair signed a five-year contract. He did not make his debut until 3 December, as a 94th-minute substitute in a defeat by West Bromwich Albion, and made his first start a few days later against Manchester City, a match in which City won at home for the first time since mid-September and BBC Sport's reporter described Sinclair as "a peripheral figure". An approach in late December by Championship club Brentford to take him on loan was rebuffed because manager Walter Mazzarri felt he was needed as cover, and Sinclair scored his first goal for Watford in their FA Cup third-round tie against Burton Albion on 7 January 2017. Towards the end of the transfer window, Mazzarri stated that Sinclair needed to gain experience and was free to go out on loan if he so wished.

==== Birmingham City (loan) ====
On 31 January 2017, Sinclair moved to Championship club Birmingham City on loan until the end of the season. He went straight into the starting eleven for the next match, at home to Fulham, partnering Lukas Jutkiewicz, and was replaced after 67 minutes with the score still goalless; Birmingham won the match 1–0. He appeared regularly during February, but the last of his five appearances came as a very late substitute in a home defeat against Leeds United on 3 March.

==== Sunderland (loan) ====
Having played just 27 minutes of Premier League football for his parent club in the 2017–18 season, Sinclair joined Sunderland, newly relegated to League One, on loan for the 2018–19 season, but the loan was cut short by mutual agreement in January 2019.

==== Oxford United (loan) ====
On transfer deadline day in January 2019, Oxford United announced that they had signed Sinclair on loan until the end of the 2018–19 season. His first Oxford goals came in a 2–1 home victory over Scunthorpe United on 2 March 2019, in which he scored both Oxford goals.

==== VVV-Venlo (loan) ====
He signed for Dutch club VVV-Venlo on loan, for the 2019–20 season.

==== CSKA Sofia (loan) ====
Sinclair moved to CSKA Sofia on 5 October 2020 on a one-year loan.

=== As a free agent ===
After a year without a club, Sinclair rejoined Oxford on a trial basis during the 2022–23 pre-season, playing his first match in over a year in a friendly against Banbury United. However, he did not earn a contract, and by January 2023, he appeared to have stepped away from football to focus on other business interests, including owning a branch of fried chicken chain Morley's.

== International career ==
Sinclair has represented England at under-16 and under-17 level. He made his under-16 debut on 27 October 2011, and scored as England beat Wales 4–0 in the 2011 Victory Shield. He also scored twice in the 2012 Montaigu Tournament, earning England wins against host nation France, and Morocco. He scored his first goal for the under-17 team on 31 August 2012, opening the scoring in a 4–1 win against Turkey. He played twice in the 2013 European U17 Championship qualifying round matches in Estonia, and was selected for the elite round of qualifying but had to withdraw from the squad because of injury.

== Career statistics ==
As of end of 2020–21 season

Appearances and goals by club, season and competition
Club	Season	League			National Cup (Note: Includes FA Cup, KNVB Cup, Bulgarian Cup)		League Cup (Note: Includes Football League Cup)		Other		Total	
Club	Season	Division	Apps	Goals	Apps	Goals	Apps	Goals	Apps	Goals	Apps	Goals
Liverpool	2012–13	Premier League	0	0	0	0	1	0	0	0	1	0
Liverpool	2013–14	Premier League	0	0	0	0	0	0	—		0	0
Liverpool	2014–15	Premier League	2	0	0	0	0	0	0	0	2	0
Liverpool	2015–16	Premier League	0	0	2	1	0	0	0	0	2	1
Liverpool	Total		2	0	2	1	1	0	0	0	5	1
Wigan Athletic (loan)	2014–15	Championship	1	0	—		—		—		1	0
Watford	2016–17	Premier League	5	0	2	1	0	0	—		7	1
Watford	2017–18	Premier League	4	0	1	0	0	0	—		5	0
Watford	2020–21	Championship	0	0	0	0	2	0	—		2	0
Watford	Total		9	0	3	1	2	0	—		14	1
Birmingham City (loan)	2016–17	Championship	5	0	—		—		—		5	0
Sunderland (loan)	2018–19	League One	13	1	3	0	0	0	3 (Note: Appearances in EFL Trophy)	1	19	2
Oxford United (loan)	2018–19	League One	16	4	—		—		—		16	4
VVV-Venlo (loan)	2019–20	Eredivisie	23	0	1	0	—		—		24	0
CSKA Sofia (loan)	2020–21	First League	18	1	5	2	—		4 (Note: Appearances in UEFA Europa League)	0	27	3
Career total			87	6	14	4	3	0	7	1	111	11

== Honours ==
CSKA Sofia

- Bulgarian Cup: 2020–21
