= 2018–19 Oxford United F.C. season =

English football club season

Oxford United
2018–19 season
- Chairman: Sumrith Thanakarnjanasuth
- Head Coach: Karl Robinson
- Stadium: Kassam Stadium
- League One: 12th
- FA Cup: Third round
- EFL Cup: Third round
- EFL Trophy: Quarter-finals
- Top goalscorer: League: James Henry (11); All: James Henry (15)
- Highest home attendance: 11,956 (v Manchester City, 25 September 2018)
- Lowest home attendance: 929 (v Northampton Town, 9 October 2018)
- Average home league attendance: 7,315
- Biggest win: 3–0 (thrice) (28 August 2018 at Newport County, EFL Cup R2) (27 October 2018 vs. Shrewsbury Town) (20 November 2018 at Forest Green Rovers, FA Cup)
- Biggest defeat: 0–4 (4 August 2018 at Barnsley)

The 2018–19 season was Oxford United's third consecutive season in League One and their 125th year in existence. As well as competing in League One, the club participated in the FA Cup, EFL Cup and EFL Trophy.

== Transfers ==
=== Transfers in ===
Date from	Position	Nationality	Name	From	Fee	Ref.
1 July 2018	CM	(England)	Armani Little	Southampton	Free transfer	
1 July 2018	RB	(England)	Tony McMahon	Bradford City	Free transfer	
1 July 2018	RB	(England)	Cameron Norman	King's Lynn Town	Free transfer	
13 July 2018	RW	(Northern Ireland)	Gavin Whyte	(Northern Ireland) Crusaders	Undisclosed	
18 July 2018	RW	(Scotland)	Jamie Mackie	Queens Park Rangers	Free transfer	
7 August 2018	CF	(England)	Harvey Bradbury	Watford	Free transfer	
9 August 2018	DM	(England)	Jamie Hanson	Derby County	Undisclosed	
9 August 2018	DM	(China)	Dai Wai Tsun	Bury	Undisclosed	
13 August 2018	LB	(England)	Matthew Taylor	Derby County	Free transfer	
2 January 2019	CM	(Northern Ireland)	Mark Sykes	(Northern Ireland) Glenavon	Undisclosed	
1 February 2019	CF	(Bermuda)	Jonte Smith	Lewes	Undisclosed	

=== Transfers out ===
Date from	Position	Nationality	Name	To	Fee	Ref.
1 July 2018	CM	(England)	Josh Ashby	Oxford City	Released	
1 July 2018	CF	(England)	Kane Hemmings	Notts County	Undisclosed	
1 July 2018	CM	(England)	Ryan Ledson	Preston North End	Undisclosed	
1 July 2018	CB	(England)	Aaron Martin	Exeter City	Released	
1 July 2018	CF	(Albania)	Agon Mehmeti	Free agent	Released	
1 July 2018	CF	(England)	James Roberts	Free agent	Released	
1 July 2018	CM	(England)	Joe Rothwell	Blackburn Rovers	Undisclosed	
1 July 2018	CF	(England)	Wes Thomas	Grimsby Town	Released	
1 July 2018	RB	(Netherlands)	Dwight Tiendalli	Free agent	Released	
1 July 2018	CB	(England)	Mike Williamson	Gateshead	Released	
9 August 2018	RB	(Republic of Ireland)	Canice Carroll	Brentford	Undisclosed	
9 August 2018	LB	(Brazil)	Ricardinho	(Netherlands) FC Twente	Free transfer	
18 January 2019	RB	(England)	Cameron Norman	Walsall	Undisclosed	
28 February 2019	CM	(Sweden)	Ivo Pękalski	Free agent	Mutual consent	

=== Loans in ===
Start date	Position	Nationality	Name	From	End date	Ref.
1 July 2018	CM	(Republic of Ireland)	Samir Carruthers	Sheffield United	31 May 2019	
2 July 2018	LB	(England)	Luke Garbutt	Everton	31 May 2019	
24 July 2018	AM	(England)	Marcus Browne	West Ham United	31 May 2019	
31 July 2018	CF	(England)	Sam Smith	Reading	29 December 2018	
9 August 2018	LW	(England)	Ricky Holmes	Sheffield United	21 January 2019	
13 August 2018	GK	(England)	Jonathan Mitchell	Derby County	January 2019	
2 January 2019	LW	(England)	Jordan Graham	Wolverhampton Wanderers	31 May 2019	
17 January 2019	DM	(Algeria)	Ahmed Kashi	(France) Troyes	31 May 2019	
31 January 2019	CF	(England)	Jerome Sinclair	Watford	31 May 2019	

=== Loans out ===
Start date	Position	Nationality	Name	To	End date	Ref
1 July 2018	CB	(Republic of Ireland)	Fiacre Kelleher	Macclesfield Town	31 May 2019	
18 July 2018	DM	(Sweden)	Ivo Pękalski	(Sweden) Hamlstads	31 November 2018	
3 August 2018	AM	(England)	Malachi Napa	Macclesfield Town	January 2019	
17 August 2018	MF	(England)	Albie Hopkins	AFC Rushden & Diamonds	November 2018	
17 August 2018	CM	(England)	Armani Little	Woking	September 2018	
1 September 2018	FW	(England)	Dejon Noel-Williams	Chesham United	October 2018	
13 September 2018	FW	(England)	Harvey Bradbury	Woking	October 2018	
2 November 2018	CF	(England)	Brandon Taverner	Didcot Town	December 2018	
3 January 2019	RB	(England)	Tony McMahon	Scunthorpe United	31 May 2019	
4 January 2019	CM	(England)	Armani Little	Woking	31 May 2019	
4 January 2019	FW	(England)	Harvey Bradbury	Woking	31 May 2019	
12 January 2019	CM	(England)	James Cowan	Bracknell Town	Youth loan	
15 January 2019	CB	(England)	Charlie Raglan	Cheltenham Town	31 May 2019	
30 January 2019	DM	(Hong Kong)	Dai Wai-tsun	FC Utrecht	31 May 2019	
1 March 2019	FW	(England)	Dejon Noel-Williams	Gloucester City	April 2019	
8 March 2019	CM	(England)	James Cowan	Gosport Borough	31 May 2019	

== Competitions ==
=== Friendlies ===
On 10 May 2018, Oxford United announced a pre-season tour of Ireland was to take place in July. Opponents Portmarnock, Longford Town and UCD were revealed four days later. Later that day, friendlies with Oxford City and Hampton & Richmond Borough were scheduled. On 16 May, the club announced a friendly with Milton Keynes Dons.

9 July 2018 Friendly	Portmarnock	0–1	Oxford United	Dublin, Ireland
19:15 BST		Report	Brannagan 22'	Stadium: Tolka Park

10 July 2018 Friendly	Longford Town	1–5	Oxford United	Longford, Ireland
19:45 BST	Dillon 33'	Report	McMahon 15'; Obika 24', 58'; Napa 55'; Derry 85' (pen.)	Stadium: Strokestown Road

11 July 2018 Friendly	UCD	0–2	Oxford United	Dublin, Ireland
17:00 BST		Report	Obika 25'; Garbutt 31'	Stadium: UCD Bowl

14 July 2018 Friendly	Oxford City	1–5	Oxford United	Marston
12:30 BST	Tshimanga 73' (pen.)		Obika 27', 48'; Little 66', 70'; Baptiste 67'	Stadium: Marsh Lane

14 July 2018 Friendly	Hampton & Richmond Borough	2–1	Oxford United	Hampton
16:00 BST	Johnson 23'; Dickson 59'	Report	Noel-Williams 3'	Stadium: Beveree Stadium; Attendance: 266

17 July 2018 Friendly	Aldershot Town	0–3	Oxford United	Aldershot
19:45 BST		Report	Nelson 39'; Obika 40'; Henry 66'	Stadium: Recreation Ground; Attendance: 703 (101 away)

18 July 2018 Friendly	Hungerford Town	2–3	Oxford United	Hungerford
19:30 BST	Bradbury 38'; Triallist 88'	Report	Lopes 48'; Triallist 76'; Norman 90'	Stadium: Bulpit Lane

21 July 2018 Friendly	Oxford United	1–3	Crystal Palace	Oxford
15:00 BST	Obika 36'	Report	Zaha 56'; Schlupp 61'; Kaikai 87'	Stadium: Kassam Stadium; Attendance: 3,479 (914 away)

24 July 2018 Friendly	Oxford United	4–3	Leeds United	Oxford
19:45 BST	Henry 7' 43'; Hall 26'; Obika 61'	Report	Roberts 53'; Baker 63'; J. Clarke 71'	Stadium: Kassam Stadium; Attendance: 4,727 (1,336 away)

27 July 2018 Friendly	Milton Keynes Dons	1–0	Oxford United	Denbigh
19:45 BST	Agard 66'	Report		Stadium: Stadium mk Attendance: 2,294 (470 away)

=== League One ===
==== League table ====
Pos	Team	Pld	W	D	L	GF	GA	GD	Pts
10	Blackpool	46	15	17	14	50	52	−2	62
11	Fleetwood Town	46	16	13	17	58	52	+6	61
12	Oxford United	46	15	15	16	58	64	−6	60
13	Gillingham	46	15	10	21	61	72	−11	55
14	Accrington Stanley	46	14	13	19	51	67	−16	55

Source: EFL Official Website
Rules for classification: 1) Points; 2) Goal difference; 3) Number of goals scored; 4) Head-to-head results

==== Results summary ====
Overall								Home						Away					
Pld	W	D	L	GF	GA	GD	Pts	W	D	L	GF	GA	GD	W	D	L	GF	GA	GD
46	15	15	16	58	64	−6	60	11	4	8	34	27	+7	4	11	8	24	37	−13

Last updated: 4 May 2019.
Source: BBC

==== Results by matchday ====
Matchday	1	2	3	4	5	6	7	8	9	10	11	12	13	14	15	16	17	18	19	20	21	22	23	24	25	26	27	28	29	30	31	32	33	34	35	36	37	38	39	40	41	42	43	44	45	46
Ground	A	H	A	H	H	A	H	A	H	A	H	A	H	A	A	H	A	H	A	H	A	H	A	H	H	A	A	H	H	A	H	H	A	A	H	A	A	H	A	H	A	H	H	A	H	A
Result	L	L	L	L	W	D	L	D	L	L	L	D	W	D	D	W	D	W	L	W	D	W	D	L	L	L	D	W	D	D	D	L	L	W	W	L	D	W	W	W	W	D	W	W	D	L
Position	24	24	24	24	22	22	23	23	23	23	23	24	23	22	21	21	21	20	20	19	19	18	18	19	20	22	21	20	20	21	20	21	22	20	19	21	21	19	13	12	12	12	12	11	11	12

Updated to match(es) played on 4 May 2019. Source: Statto.com
A = Away; H = Home; W = Win; D = Draw; L = Loss

==== Matches ====
On 21 June 2018, the League One fixtures for the forthcoming season were announced.

4 August 2018 1	Barnsley	4–0	Oxford United	Barnsley
15:00 BST	Thiam 20', 29'; Potts 77'; Adeboyejo 89'	Report		Stadium: Oakwell; Attendance: 12,820 (1,279 away); Referee: Ross Joyce

11 August 2018 2	Oxford United	0–2	Fleetwood Town	Oxford
15:00 BST	Browne (yellow card) 70'	Report	Evans 34'; Morgan (yellow card) 74'; Burns (yellow card) 85'; Madden 89' (pen.); Hunter (yellow card) 90+5'	Stadium: Kassam Stadium; Attendance: 6,689 (87 away); Referee: Ollie Yates

18 August 2018 3	Portsmouth	4–1	Oxford United	Milton
15:00 BST	Evans 48'; Naylor (yellow card) 53'; Dickie 56' (o.g.); Lowe 65' 90+2'; Thompson (yellow card) 90+6'	Report	Hanson (yellow card) 25'; Brannagan (yellow card) 29'; Baptiste (yellow card) 39'; Whatmough 89' (o.g.)	Stadium: Fratton Park; Attendance: 18,093 (1,312 away); Referee: Lee Swabey

21 August 2018 4	Oxford United	2–3	Accrington Stanley	Oxford
19:45 BST	Whyte 27'; Browne 57' (yellow card) 65'; Brannagan (yellow card) 60'; Norman (yellow card) 84'	Report	Brown (yellow card) 19'; McConville (yellow card) 34'; Norman 43' (o.g.); Kee 62' 79' (pen.); Clark (yellow card) 80'; Sykes (yellow card) 90+2'; Ripley (yellow card) 90+4'	Stadium: Kassam Stadium; Attendance: 5,748 (118 away); Referee: Geoff Eltringham

25 August 2018 5	Oxford United	3–1	Burton Albion	Oxford
15:00 BST	Mousinho 18'; Henry 50'; Smith (yellow card) 54'; Holmes 69'; Norman (yellow card) 76'; Nelson (yellow card) 80'	Report	Templeton (yellow card) 25'; Sordell 39'; Allen (yellow card) 71' (yellow-red card) 87'; Brayford (yellow card) 81'; Fraser (yellow card) 89'	Stadium: Kassam Stadium; Attendance: 6,026 (382 away); Referee: Trevor Kettle

1 September 2018 6	Sunderland	1–1	Oxford United	Sunderland
15:00 BST	Maguire (yellow card) 12'; Cattermole (yellow card) 14'; Power (red card) 19'; Gooch (yellow card) 22'; Wyke 52'; Oviedo (yellow card) 48'; Love (yellow card) 75'	Report	Holmes 16'; Brannagan (yellow card) 26'; Ruffles (yellow card) 61'; Baptiste (yellow card) 71'	Stadium: Stadium of Light; Attendance: 32,193 (1,280 away); Referee: Mark Heywood

9 September 2018 7	Oxford United	1–2	Coventry City	Oxford
12:00 BST	Holmes (yellow card) 45+2'; Obika 86'	Report	Shipley (yellow card) 12'; Brown (yellow card) 13'; Mousinho 64' (o.g.); Chaplin 81' (pen.); Clarke-Harris (yellow card) 87'	Stadium: Kassam Stadium; Attendance: 7,519 (774 away); Referee: Dean Whitestone

15 September 2018 8	Wycombe Wanderers	0–0	Oxford United	High Wycombe
15:00 BST	Jacobson (yellow card) 71'; Jombati (yellow card) 76'; McCarthy (yellow card) 80'; Gape (yellow card) 85'	Report	Baptiste (yellow card) 79'; Mousinho (yellow card) 80'	Stadium: Adams Park; Attendance: 6,879 (1,816 away); Referee: David Webb

22 September 2018 9	Oxford United	1–2	Walsall	Oxford
15:00 BST	Mousinho (yellow card) 42'; Henry 87' (yellow card) 90+1'; Garbutt (yellow card) 90+3'	Report	Fitzwater (yellow card) 25'; Ferrier 24'; Dobson (yellow card) 52'; Ismail 58'; Gordon (yellow card) 60'; Ginnelly (yellow card) 81'; Cook (yellow card) 90+5'	Stadium: Kassam Stadium; Attendance: 6,080 (658 away); Referee: Alan Young

29 September 2018 10	AFC Wimbledon	2–1	Oxford United	Norbiton
15:00 BST	Wagstaff 20'; Pigott 32'; Barcham (yellow card) 36'; Purrington (yellow card) 55'	Report	Long (yellow card) 38'; Brannagan 44'	Stadium: Kingsmeadow; Attendance: 4,068 (618 away); Referee: Robert Lewis

2 October 2018 11	Oxford United	1–2	Luton Town	Oxford
19:45 BST	Holmes 48'; Baptiste (yellow card) 28' (yellow-red card) 73'; Hanson (yellow card) 76'; McMahon (yellow card) 90+5'; Brannagan (yellow card) 90+6'	Report	Collins 55'; Stacey (yellow card) 66'; Lee (yellow card) 76'; Rea (yellow card) 82'; Potts 90+8'	Stadium: Kassam Stadium; Attendance: 6,769 (1,171 away); Referee: Michael Salisbury

6 October 2018 12	Southend United	0–0	Oxford United	Southend
15:00 BST	Demetriou (yellow card) 86'	Report	Mackie (yellow card) 81'; Whyte (yellow card) 84'	Stadium: Roots Hall; Attendance: 6,670 (436 away); Referee: Craig Hicks

13 October 2018 13	Oxford United	2–0	Plymouth Argyle	Oxford
15:00 BST	Mackie 4', (yellow card) 79'; Brannagan (yellow card) 30'; Nelson 74'	Report	Songo'o (yellow card) 26' (yellow-red card) 81'; Smith-Brown (yellow card) 43'; O'Keefe (yellow card) 80'	Stadium: Kassam Stadium; Attendance: 7,332 (1,285 away); Referee: Andy Woolmer

20 October 2018 14	Bristol Rovers	0–0	Oxford United	Horfield
15:00 BST	Craig (yellow card) 16'; Lockyer (yellow card) 21'; Jakubiak (yellow card) 45'	Report	Browne (yellow card) 26'; Mackie (yellow card) 41'	Stadium: Memorial Stadium; Attendance: 8,506 (921 away); Referee: Tom Nield

23 October 2018 15	Charlton Athletic	1–1	Oxford United	Charlton
19:45 BST	Taylor 25' (pen.); Fosu-Henry (yellow card) 51'	Report	Nelson (yellow card) 34'; Ruffles (yellow card) 45+1'; Dickie (yellow card) 53'; Whyte 71'; Mackie (yellow card) 76'	Stadium: The Valley; Attendance: 9,984 (538 away); Referee: Dean Whitestone

27 October 2018 16	Oxford United	3–0	Shrewsbury Town	Oxford
15:00 BST	Ruffels 3'; Whyte 14'; Browne 86'	Report	Angol (yellow card) 51'	Stadium: Kassam Stadium; Attendance: 8,697 (594 away); Referee: Martin Coy

3 November 2018 17	Scunthorpe United	3–3	Oxford United	Scunthorpe
15:00 GMT	Lund (yellow card) 17'; Goode (yellow card) 26', (goal) 66'; Perch (yellow card) 57'; Clarke 60'; Thomas 64'	Report	Henry 8'; Dickie (yellow card) 42'; Brannagan 50', (yellow card) 63'; Nelson 55'; Hanson (yellow card) 87'; McMahon (yellow card) 90'; Mackie (yellow card) 90'	Stadium: Glanford Park; Attendance: 3,665 (383 away); Referee: Paul Marsden

17 November 2018 18	Oxford United	1–0	Gillingham	Oxford
15:00 GMT	Brannagan (yellow card) 40'; Henry 59' (pen.); Browne (yellow card) 83'; Bradbury (yellow card) 89'	Report	Zakuani (yellow card) 73'	Stadium: Kassam Stadium; Attendance: 6,628 (521 away); Referee: Neil Hair

24 November 2018 19	Bradford City	2–0	Oxford United	Bradford
15:00 GMT	O'Connor (yellow card) 19'; Ball 25'; Payne 28'; Knight-Percival (red card) 87'; Miller (yellow card) 90'	Report	Brannagan (yellow card) 17'; Mousinho (yellow card) 75'; Whyte (yellow card) 90+8'; Smith (yellow card) 90+8'	Stadium: Valley Parade; Attendance: 19,084 (812 away); Referee: Darren Drysdale

27 November 2018 20	Oxford United	4–2	Rochdale	Oxford
19:45 GMT	Mackie 11'; Henry 14'; Browne (yellow card) 45+4' (goal) 52' 78'	Report	Henderson 30'; Randall (yellow card) 36'; Wilbraham (yellow card) 39'; McNulty (yellow card) 48'; Williams (yellow card) 55'; Camps 69'; McGahey (yellow card) 90+2'	Stadium: Kassam Stadium; Attendance: 5,204 (139 away); Referee: Craig Hicks

8 December 2018 21	Peterborough United	2–2	Oxford United	Peterborough
15:00 GMT	Toney 10'; Tafazolli (yellow card) 44'; Woodyard (yellow card) 45+3'; Ward (yellow card) 70'; Dembélé 75'	Report	Mackie (yellow card) 33'; Browne (yellow card) 36'; Henry 42' 88' (pen.); Nelson (yellow card) 84'	Stadium: London Road; Attendance: 7,027 (534 away); Referee: Charles Breakspear

15 December 2018 22	Oxford United	2–0	Blackpool	Oxford
15:00 GMT	Browne 29'; Henry 41'	Report		Stadium: Kassam Stadium; Attendance: 6,003 (294 away); Referee: Matt Donohue

22 December 2018 23	Doncaster Rovers	2–2	Oxford United	Doncaster
15:00 GMT	Whiteman 20' (pen.); Crawford (yellow card) 45'; Butler (yellow card) 80'; May 90'	Report	Dickie (yellow card) 9'; Mousinho (yellow card) 45+2'; Hanson (yellow card) 45+3'; Ruffels (yellow card) 61' (goal) 90+7'; Whyte 64'	Stadium: Keepmoat Stadium; Attendance: 7,425 (470 away); Referee: Alan Young

26 December 2018 24	Oxford United	0–1	Southend United	Oxford
15:00 GMT	Dickie (yellow card) 45'; Mackie (yellow card) 87'	Report	Bwomono (yellow card) 73'; Kightly 79'; Hyam (yellow card) 90+1'; Cox (yellow card) 90+7'	Stadium: Kassam Stadium; Attendance: 8,978 (604 away); Referee: Tim Robinson

29 December 2018 25	Oxford United	0–2	Bristol Rovers	Oxford
13:00 GMT		Report	Jakubiak 15', 63'; Clarke (yellow card) 45+2'; Kelly (yellow card) 83'	Stadium: Kassam Stadium; Attendance: 8,135 (1,475 away); Referee: Graham Salisbury

1 January 2019 26	Plymouth Argyle	3–0	Oxford United	Plymouth
15:00 GMT	Sarcevic 9' (yellow card) 33'; Lameiras 41' 67'; Carey (yellow card) 78'; Sawyer (yellow card) 86'	Report	Nelson (yellow card) 33'; Brannagan (yellow card) 54'; Dickie (yellow card) 59'	Stadium: Home Park; Attendance: 10,223 (534 away); Referee: Brett Huxtable

12 January 2019 27	Fleetwood Town	2–2	Oxford United	Fleetwood
15:00 GMT	Burns 9'; Madden 26'	Report	Henry 52'; Mackie 64'	Stadium: Highbury Stadium; Attendance: 2,789; Referee: Andy Haines

19 January 2019 28	Oxford United	2–1	Portsmouth	Oxford
15:00 GMT	Brannagan 25'; Henry 45'	Report	Pitman 64'	Stadium: Kassam Stadium; Attendance: 8,202 (1,803 away); Referee: Chris Sarginson

29 January 2019 29	Oxford United	2–2	Barnsley	Oxford
19:45 GMT	Ruffels 25'; Mackie 48'	Report	Thiam 70'; Moore 79'	Stadium: Kassam Stadium; Attendance: 5,794 (657 away); Referee: Kevin Johnson

2 February 2019 30	Burton Albion	0–0	Oxford United	Burton upon Trent
15:00 GMT	Brayford (red card) 12'; Templeton (yellow card) 51'; Boyce (yellow card) 76'; McFadzean (yellow card) 90+1'	Report	Mousinho (yellow card) 45+1'	Stadium: Pirelli Stadium; Attendance: 3,197 (844 away); Referee: Brett Huxtable

9 February 2019 31	Oxford United	1–1	Sunderland	Oxford
15:00 GMT	Browne 87'	Report	Dunne 34'	Stadium: Kassam Stadium; Attendance: 10,383 (1,808 away); Referee: Scott Oldham

16 February 2019 32	Oxford United	0–1	Peterborough United	Oxford
15:00 GMT	Hanson (yellow card) 46'; Dickie (yellow card) 70'; Browne (yellow card) 90+4'	Report	White (yellow card) 8'; Maddison (yellow card) 36'; Toney 76'; Woodyard (yellow card) 81'	Stadium: Kassam Stadium; Attendance: 6,541 (490 away); Referee: Ross Joyce

19 February 2019 33	Accrington Stanley	4–2	Oxford United	Accrington
19:45 GMT	Kee 36'; Richards-Everton (yellow card) 39'; McConville 57' (yellow card) 70'; Clark 73'; Armstrong 90+4'	Report	Brannagan (yellow card) 44'; Garbutt 63'; Mousinho 89'	Stadium: Crown Ground; Attendance: 2,095 (311 away); Referee: Christopher Sarginson

23 February 2019 34	Blackpool	0–1	Oxford United	Blackpool
15:00 GMT	Tilt (yellow card) 36'; Spearing (yellow card) 39'; Heneghan (yellow card) 69'	Report	Graham 40'; Sinclair (yellow card) 77'; Ruffels (yellow card) 80'	Stadium: Bloomfield Road; Attendance: 4,003 (818 away); Referee: Andy Haines

2 March 2019 35	Oxford United	2–1	Scunthorpe United	Oxford
15:00 GMT	Sinclair 65' 80'	Report	Thomas 90+2'	Stadium: Kassam Stadium; Attendance: 6,237 (295 away); Referee: Michael Salisbury

9 March 2019 36	Gillingham	1–0	Oxford United	Gillingham
15:00 GMT	Eaves (penalty missed) 52'; Fuller (yellow card) 87'; Hanlan 89'; O'Neill (yellow card) 90+2'	Report	Dickie (yellow card) 50'	Stadium: Priestfield Stadium; Attendance: 4,991 (656 away); Referee: Oliver Yates

12 March 2019 37	Rochdale	0–0	Oxford United	Rochdale
19:45 GMT	McNulty (yellow card) 32'	Report	Dickie (yellow card) 46'	Stadium: Spotland Stadium; Attendance: 2,331 (251 away); Referee: Anthony Backhouse

16 March 2019 38	Oxford United	1–0	Bradford City	Oxford
15:00 GMT	Mackie (yellow card) 89' (goal) 90+4'; Kashi (yellow card) 90+1'	Report	Ball (yellow card) 41'; Akpan (yellow card) 84'	Stadium: Kassam Stadium; Attendance: 6,681 (654 away); Referee: Andy Davies

23 March 2019 39	Coventry City	0–1	Oxford United	Coventry
15:00 GMT	Hiwula (yellow card) 41'	Report	Browne (yellow card) 45'; Graham (yellow card) 45+2'; Nelson 57'; Garbutt (yellow card) 75'	Stadium: Ricoh Arena; Attendance: 14,044 (2,007 away); Referee: Scott Oldham

30 March 2019 40	Oxford United	2–1	Wycombe Wanderers	Oxford
15:00 GMT	Sinclair 30'; Ruffels 90+6'	Report	El-Abd 21'; Jacobson (penalty missed) 37'	Stadium: Kassam Stadium; Attendance: 9,250 (1,716 away); Referee: Simon Hooper

6 April 2019 41	Walsall	1–3	Oxford United	Walsall
15:00 GMT	Gordon (yellow card) 17'; Cook 26' (yellow card) 90+4'; Dobson (yellow card) 39'	Report	Kashi (yellow card) 16' (yellow-red card) 90+7'; Dickie 21'; Browne (red card) 45+8'; Garbutt 63'; Sinclair 90+5' (yellow card) 90+6'; Graham (yellow card) 90+7'	Stadium: Bescot Stadium; Attendance: 6,339 (1,462 away); Referee: David Webb

13 April 2019 42	Oxford United	0–0	AFC Wimbledon	Oxford
15:00 BST		Report		Stadium: Kassam Stadium; Attendance: 7,678 (1,301 away); Referee: Alan Young

19 April 2019 43	Oxford United	2–1	Charlton Athletic	Oxford
13:00 BST	Nelson 18'; Garbutt 23' (yellow card) 81'; Kashi (yellow card) 24'; Eastwood (red card) 54'; Brannagan (yellow card) 89'	Report	Taylor 5' (pen.); Bielik (yellow card) 66'; Solly (red card) 74'; Lapslie (yellow card) 88'	Stadium: Kassam Stadium; Attendance: 8,680 (1,806 away); Referee: Darren Drysdale

22 April 2019 44	Shrewsbury Town	2–3	Oxford United	Shrewsbury
15:00 GMT	Norburn 17' (pen.); Docherty 40'	Report	Whyte 6' 72' 78'; Kashi (red card) 36'	Stadium: New Meadow; Attendance: 7,189 (901 away); Referee: Chris Sarginson

29 April 2019 45	Oxford United	2–2	Doncaster Rovers	Oxford
15:00 BST	Browne 13' (yellow card) 67'; Henry 49'; Nelson (yellow card) 71'	Report	Marquis 7'; Downing (yellow card) 12'; Jones 61' (o.g.); Blair (yellow card) 80'; Kane (yellow card) 88'	Stadium: Kassam Stadium; Attendance: 9,000 (709 away); Referee: Charles Breakspear

4 May 2019 46	Luton Town	3–1	Oxford United	Luton
17:30 GMT	Moncur 3' 73'; Lee 53'	Report	Garbutt 60'	Stadium: Kenilworth Road; Attendance: 10,089 (1,025 away); Referee: Michael Salisbury

=== FA Cup ===
The first round draw was made live on BBC by Dennis Wise and Dion Dublin on 22 October. The draw for the second round was made live on BBC and BT by Mark Schwarzer and Glenn Murray on 12 November. The third round draw was made live on BBC by Ruud Gullit and Paul Ince from Stamford Bridge on 3 December 2018.

10 November 2018 First round	Oxford United	0–0	Forest Green Rovers	Oxford
15:00 GMT	Mousinho (yellow card) 52'; McMahon (yellow card) 58'	Report	Winchester (yellow card) 60'	Stadium: Kassam Stadium; Attendance: 3,933 (452 away); Referee: Nicholas Kinseley

20 November 2018 First round replay	Forest Green Rovers	0–3	Oxford United	Nailsworth
19:45 GMT	McGinley (yellow card) 26'	Report	Henry 36'; Mackie 47'; Brannagan (yellow card) 65'; Browne 78'	Stadium: The New Lawn; Attendance: 1,614 (509 away); Referee: Trevor Kettle

1 December 2018 Second round	Plymouth Argyle	1–2	Oxford United	Plymouth
15:00 GMT	Riley (yellow card) 35'; Ness (yellow card) 41'; Sarcevic 67'; Smith-Brown (yellow card) 77'	Report	Henry 49'; Brannagan 53' (yellow card) 67'	Stadium: Home Park; Attendance: 5,984 (381 away); Referee: Peter Wright

5 January 2019 Third round	Brentford	1–0	Oxford United	Brentford
15:00 GMT	Maupay 80' (pen.)	Report	Mousinho (yellow card) 45+1'; Nelson (yellow card) 61'; Browne (yellow card) 90+5'; Henry (yellow card) 90+7'	Stadium: Griffin Park; Attendance: 6,106 (1,605 away); Referee: Jeremy Simpson

=== EFL Cup ===
On 15 June 2018, the draw for the first round was made in Vietnam. The second round draw was made from the Stadium of Light on 16 August. The third-round draw was made on 30 August 2018 by David Seaman and Joleon Lescott, handing Oxford a home tie against defending Premiership champions Manchester City.

13 August 2018 First round	Oxford United	2–0	Coventry City	Oxford
19:00 BST	Browne 39'; Norman (yellow card) 45+1'; Whyte 50'	Report		Stadium: Kassam Stadium; Attendance: 3,551 (1,003 away); Referee: James Linington

28 August 2018 Second round	Newport County	0–3	Oxford United	Newport
19:45 BST	Cooper (yellow card) 45'	Report	Demetriou 2' (o.g.); Baptiste 4'; Hanson (red card) 78'; Dickie (yellow card) 79'; Garbutt (yellow card) 89'; Whyte 90+1'	Stadium: Rodney Parade; Attendance: 2,228 (282 away); Referee: Scott Duncan

25 September 2018 Third round	Oxford United	0–3	Manchester City	Oxford
19:45 BST	Garbutt (yellow card) 37'; Dickie (yellow card) 82'	Report	Jesus 36'; Danilo (yellow card) 64'; Mahrez 78'; Foden 90+2'	Stadium: Kassam Stadium; Attendance: 11,956 (1,247 away); Referee: Roger East

=== EFL Trophy ===
On 13 July 2018, the initial group stage draw bar the U21 invited clubs was announced. The draw for the second round was made live on Talksport by Leon Britton and Steve Claridge on 16 November. On 8 December, the third round draw was drawn by Alan McInally and Matt Le Tissier on Soccer Saturday. The Quarter-final draw was made conducted on Sky Sports by Don Goodman and Thomas Frank on 10 January 2019.

Pos	Lge	Team	Pld	W	PW	PL	L	GF	GA	GD	Pts	Qualification
1	L1	Oxford United (Q)	3	2	0	0	1	7	2	+5	6	Round 2
2	L2	Northampton Town (Q)	3	2	0	0	1	4	2	+2	6	Round 2
3	L1	Wycombe Wanderers (E)	3	2	0	0	1	3	4	−1	6	
4	ACA	Fulham U21 (E)	3	0	0	0	3	1	7	−6	0	

First match(es) will be played: 4 September 2018. Source: EFL.com
(E) Eliminated; (Q) Qualified to the phase indicated

5 September 2018 Group Stage	Oxford United	3–0	Fulham U21s	Oxford
19:45 BST	Smith 31'; Holmes 58'; Spasov 58' (pen.)	Report	Stahl (red card) 50'; Opoku (yellow card) 77'; Jenz (yellow card) 85'	Stadium: Kassam Stadium; Attendance: 1,116 (76 away); Referee: Craig Hicks

9 October 2018 Group Stage	Oxford United	1–2	Northampton Town	Oxford
19:45 BST	Henry 24' (yellow card) 27'	Report	Bowditch (yellow card) 27'; O'Toole (yellow card) 27' (yellow-red card) 90+5'; Pierre (yellow card) 27' (goal) 65'; Facey (yellow card) 29' van Veen (yellow card) 32' (goal) 55'	Stadium: Kassam Stadium; Attendance: 929 (117 away); Referee: Kevin Johnson

6 November 2018 Group Stage	Wycombe Wanderers	0–3	Oxford United	High Wycombe
19:45 GMT	Fox (yellow card) 52'; Thompson (yellow card) 69'; McCarthy (yellow card) 72'	Report	Brannagan 1'; Browne 31'; Smith 53' (yellow card) 58'	Stadium: Adams Park; Attendance: 1,313 (289 away); Referee: Kevin Friend

18 December 2018 Second round	Oxford United	3–0	Tottenham Hotspur U21	Oxford
19:45 GMT	Raglan 12'; Smith 18' (yellow card) 89'; McMahon 48'	Report		Stadium: Kassam Stadium; Attendance: 1,422 (131 away); Referee: Kevin Johnson

8 January 2019 Third round	Cheltenham Town	1–1 (1–4 p)	Oxford United	Cheltenham
19:45 GMT	Varney (yellow card) 39'; Alcock (yellow card) 50'; Dawson 64'	Report	Brannagan (yellow card) 36' (goal) 45+1'	Stadium: Whaddon Road; Attendance: 1,288 (332 away); Referee: Ollie Yates
	Penalties
	Thomas (penalty missed); Clements (penalty missed); Hussey (penalty scored)		Mousinho (penalty scored); Henry (penalty scored); Graham (penalty scored); Brannagan (penalty scored)

22 January 2019 Quarter-final	Bury	5–2	Oxford United	Bury
19:45 GMT	Telford 16'; Thompson 26'; Moore 41'; Mayor 55' 76'	Report	Henry 24' (pen.); Graham (yellow card) 37'; Carruthers 51'; Hanson (yellow card) 86'	Stadium: Gigg Lane; Attendance: 1,238 (101 away); Referee: Thomas Bramall

== Squad statistics ==
=== Appearances and goals ===
As of 4 May 2019

No.	Pos	Nat	Player	Total		League One		FA Cup		League Cup		FL Trophy	
No.	Pos	Nat	Player	Apps	Goals	Apps	Goals	Apps	Goals	Apps	Goals	Apps	Goals
1	GK	(England) ENG	Simon Eastwood	41	0	33	0	4	0	0	0	4	0
2	DF	(England) ENG	Cameron Norman	12	0	6+1	0	0+2	0	2	0	1	0
3	DF	(England) ENG	Luke Garbutt	36	4	18+7	4	2+1	0	3	0	5	0
4	DF	(England) ENG	Robert Dickie	48	1	35+1	1	4	0	3	0	5	0
5	DF	(England) ENG	Curtis Nelson	54	4	45	4	4	0	1	0	3+1	0
6	DF	(England) ENG	Jamie Hanson	40	0	21+8	0	3+1	0	2	0	5	0
7	FW	(England) ENG	Robert Hall	4	0	1+3	0	0	0	0	0	0	0
8	MF	(England) ENG	Cameron Brannagan	52	6	39+1	3	3	1	2+1	0	6	2
9	FW	(England) ENG	Sam Smith	23	3	5+9	0	1+1	0	1+2	0	4	3
9	FW	(England) ENG	Jerome Sinclair	16	4	10+6	4	0	0	0	0	0	0
10	MF	(England) ENG	Marcus Browne	43	10	25+8	7	3+1	1	1	1	3+2	1
11	MF	(Ireland) EIR	Samir Carruthers	11	1	3+6	0	0	0	0	0	1+1	1
12	MF	(England) ENG	Ricky Holmes	19	4	13+3	3	0	0	1	0	1+1	1
13	GK	(Scotland) SCO	Scott Shearer	1	0	1	0	0	0	0	0	0	0
14	MF	(England) ENG	Josh Ruffels	51	4	39+4	4	3	0	1+1	0	3	0
15	DF	(England) ENG	John Mousinho	42	2	31+3	2	4	0	2	0	0+2	0
16	MF	(Northern Ireland) NIR	Gavin Whyte	45	9	28+6	7	4	0	3	2	3+1	0
17	MF	(England) ENG	James Henry	55	15	38+5	11	4	2	1+2	0	5	2
18	MF	(England) ENG	Jordan Graham	19	1	13+3	1	1	0	0	0	2	0
19	FW	(Scotland) SCO	Jamie Mackie	47	6	28+13	5	3+1	1	0+1	0	1	0
20	FW	(England) ENG	Jon Obika	16	1	5+6	1	0	0	3	0	0+2	0
22	DF	(England) ENG	Charlie Raglan	5	1	0+1	0	0	0	0	0	4	1
23	DF	(England) ENG	Sam Long	26	0	16+2	0	0+2	0	1+1	0	2+2	0
24	MF	(Northern Ireland) NIR	Mark Sykes	11	0	7+2	0	0	0	0	0	0+2	0
26	MF	(Grenada) GRN	Shandon Baptiste	14	1	7+2	0	0+1	0	3	1	1	0
27	GK	(England) ENG	Jack Stevens	2	0	1+1	0	0	0	0	0	0	0
29	DF	(England) ENG	Tony McMahon	13	1	10	0	1	0	0	0	2	1
30	MF	(England) ENG	Armani Little	2	0	0+1	0	0	0	0	0	1	0
32	MF	(Wales) WAL	Aaron Heap	2	0	0	0	0	0	0	0	0+2	0
38	FW	(Bermuda) BER	Jonte Smith	1	0	0+1	0	0	0	0	0	0	0
40	MF	(Algeria) ALG	Ahmed Kashi	11	0	6+4	0	0	0	0	0	1	0
41	GK	(England) ENG	Jonathan Mitchell	15	0	10	0	0	0	3	0	2	0
42	FW	(England) ENG	Owen James	0	0	0	0	0	0	0	0	0	0
43	FW	(England) ENG	Fábio Lopes	2	0	0	0	0	0	0+1	0	1	0
44	FW	(Bulgaria) BUL	Slavi Spasov	2	1	0+1	0	0	0	0	0	0+1	1
45	FW	(England) ENG	Harvey Bradbury	2	0	0+1	0	0	0	0	0	0+1	0
46	DF	(England) ENG	Nico Jones	4	0	2+1	0	0	0	0	0	0+1	0

== Top scorers ==
As of 4 May 2019

Place	Position	Nation	Number	Name	League One	FA Cup	League Cup	FL Trophy	Total
1	MF	(England)	17	James Henry	11	2	0	2	15
2=	FW	(England)	10	Marcus Browne	6	1	1	1	9
2=	MF	(Northern Ireland)	16	Gavin Whyte	7	0	2	0	9
4	FW	(Scotland)	19	Jamie Mackie	5	1	0	1	7
5	MF	(England)	8	Cameron Brannagan	3	1	0	2	6
6=	FW	(England)	9	Jerome Sinclair	4	0	0	0	4
6=	MF	(England)	12	Ricky Holmes	3	0	0	1	4
6=	MF	(England)	14	Josh Ruffels	4	0	0	0	4
6=	DF	(England)	5	Curtis Nelson	4	0	0	0	4
6=	DF	(England)	3	Luke Garbutt	4	0	0	0	4
11	FW	(England)	9	Sam Smith	0	0	0	3	3
12=	DF	(England)	4	Robert Dickie	1	0	0	1	2
12=	DF	(England)	15	John Mousinho	2	0	0	0	2
12=	Own goal				1	0	1	0	2
15=	MF	(Republic of Ireland)	11	Samir Carruthers	0	0	0	1	1
15=	MF	(England)	18	Jordan Graham	1	0	0	0	1
15=	FW	(England)	20	Jon Obika	1	0	0	0	1
15=	DF	(England)	22	Charlie Raglan	0	0	0	1	1
15=	MF	(Grenada)	26	Shandon Baptiste	0	0	1	0	1
15=	DF	(England)	29	Tony McMahon	0	0	0	1	1
15=	FW	(Bulgaria)	44	Slavi Spasov	0	0	0	1	1
TOTALS					55	5	5	13	78

=== Disciplinary record ===
As of 4 May 2019

Number	Nation	Position	Name	League One		FA Cup		League Cup		FL Trophy		Total	
Number	Nation	Position	Name	Booked	Sent off (straight red)	Booked	Sent off (straight red)	Booked	Sent off (straight red)	Booked	Sent off (straight red)	Booked	Sent off (straight red)
1	(England)	GK	Simon Eastwood	0	1	0	0	0	0	0	0	0	1
2	(England)	DF	Cameron Norman	2	0	0	0	1	0	0	0	3	0
3	(England)	DF	Luke Garbutt	3	0	0	0	2	0	0	0	5	0
4	(England)	DF	Robert Dickie	8	0	0	0	2	0	0	0	10	0
5	(England)	DF	Curtis Nelson	6	0	1	0	0	0	0	0	7	0
6	(England)	DF	Jamie Hanson	6	0	0	0	0	1	1	0	7	1
8	(England)	MF	Cameron Brannagan	12	0	1	0	0	0	1	0	15	0
9	(England)	FW	Sam Smith	2	0	0	0	0	0	2	0	4	0
9	(England)	FW	Jerome Sinclair	2	0	0	0	0	0	0	0	2	0
10	(England)	MF	Marcus Browne	10	1	1	0	0	0	0	0	11	1
12	(England)	MF	Ricky Holmes	1	0	0	0	0	0	0	0	1	0
14	(England)	MF	Josh Ruffels	5	0	0	0	0	0	0	0	5	0
15	(England)	DF	John Mousinho	6	0	2	0	0	0	0	0	8	0
16	(Northern Ireland)	MF	Gavin Whyte	3	0	0	0	0	0	0	0	3	0
17	(England)	MF	James Henry	3	0	1	0	0	0	1	0	5	0
18	(England)	MF	Jordan Graham	2	0	0	0	0	0	1	0	3	0
19	(Scotland)	FW	Jamie Mackie	11	0	0	0	0	0	0	0	11	0
23	(England)	DF	Sam Long	2	0	0	0	0	0	0	0	2	0
26	(Grenada)	MF	Shandon Baptiste	3	1	0	0	0	0	0	0	3	1
29	(England)	DF	Tony McMahon	2	0	1	0	0	0	0	0	3	0
40	(Algeria)	MF	Ahmed Kashi	2	2	0	0	0	0	0	0	2	2
45	(England)	FW	Harvey Bradbury	1	0	0	0	0	0	0	0	1	0
TOTALS				92	5	7	0	5	1	6	0	111	6
