= Harvey Bradbury =

English footballer

Personal information
- Full name: Harvey Lee Bradbury
- Date of birth: 29 December 1998 (age 27)
- Place of birth: England
- Height: 1.91 m (6 ft 3 in)
- Position: Forward

Team information
- Current team: Hanwell Town

Youth career
- Portsmouth

Senior career*
Years	Team	Apps	(Gls)
2016–2017	Portsmouth	0	(0)
2017	→ Havant & Waterlooville (loan)	1	(0)
2017–2018	Watford	0	(0)
2018	→ St Albans City (loan)	9	(2)
2018	→ Hungerford Town (loan)	1	(1)
2018–2019	Oxford United	1	(0)
2018	→ Hungerford Town (loan)	7	(1)
2018	→ Woking (loan)	1	(1)
2019	→ Woking (loan)	16	(2)
2019–2020	Millwall	0	(0)
2020	→ Morecambe (loan)	3	(0)
2020–2022	Oxford City	38	(15)
2022	Welling United	8	(2)
2022	Gosport Borough	10	(3)
2022–2023	Dorchester Town	14	(4)
2023	→ Dartford (loan)	9	(5)
2023–2024	Dartford	22	(5)
2024	Farnborough	10	(0)
2024	Chatham Town	6	(2)
2024–2025	Havant & Waterlooville	33	(13)
2025–2026	Shaftesbury	11	(6)
2026–	Hanwell Town	16	(3)
- * Club domestic league appearances and goals as of 09:13, 15 May 2026 (UTC)

Harvey Lee Bradbury (born 29 December 1998) is an English professional footballer who plays as a forward for Southern League Premier Division South club Hanwell Town.

He began his career at Portsmouth and spent time on loan at Havant & Waterlooville, before being signed by Watford in 2017. He spent the second half of the 2017–18 season on loan at St Albans City and joined Hungerford Town on loan in July 2018. He signed with Oxford United the next month and returned to Hungerford Town on loan. He was loaned to Woking in September 2018 and made his debut for Oxford in the Football League two months later. He rejoined Woking on loan for the second half of the 2018–19 season and helped the club to win promotion out of the National League South via the play-offs. He signed with Millwall in July 2019 and spent the second half of the 2019–20 season on loan at Morecambe.

Following his departure from Millwall, Bradbury subsequently had spells in non-league with Oxford City, Welling United, Gosport Borough, Dorchester Town, Dartford, Farnborough and most recently, Chatham Town.

== Early and personal life ==
Bradbury's father Lee was also a footballer. Both played at Oxford United during their careers, the first father and son to have played for the club.

== Career ==
=== Portsmouth ===
Bradbury began his career with Portsmouth and had a loan spell with Havant & Waterlooville during the 2016–17 season. He played one Isthmian League Premier Division game for the "Hawks" in the 2016–17 season. He scored 14 goals in 26 youth level games for "Pompey", including one goal against Manchester City in the FA Youth Cup, though never made a first-team appearance at Fratton Park.

=== Watford ===
He joined the under-23 squad at Premier League side Watford, initially on a trial basis, in May 2017. On 5 January 2018, he moved on loan to St Albans City until the end of the 2017–18 season, having impressed manager Ian Allinson in a pre-season friendly. He made his debut the following day in a 2–1 win over Chelmsford City at Clarence Park. On 20 January, he was sent off for after receiving two yellow cards in a 1–1 draw at Eastbourne Borough. He scored his first career goal on 17 March, in a 2–1 victory at Concord Rangers.

=== Oxford United ===
He returned to the National League South on loan at Hungerford Town in July 2018 and scored on his debut in a 3–2 defeat at former club St Albans City on 4 August. Three days later he signed for Oxford United under-23s on a free transfer, and continued his loan at Hungerford Town. He scored a total of two goals in eight games for the "Crusaders". He then moved on loan to Woking, also of the National League South, in September 2018. He scored on his debut for the "Cardinals" in a 2–1 defeat to Dulwich Hamlet at Kingfield Stadium on 15 September. The following week he scored a hat-trick in a 4–0 victory over Tooting & Mitcham United in the FA Cup Second Qualifying Round. He returned to Oxford and manager Karl Robinson gave him his senior debut on 6 November 2018, in a 3–0 victory at Wycombe Wanderers in the EFL Trophy. He made his Football League debut 11 days later, coming on as a 56th-minute substitute for Sam Smith in a 1–0 win over Gillingham at the Kassam Stadium. After those two first-team appearances for Oxford, he returned on loan to Woking for the rest of the 2018–19 season on 4 January. He scored six goals in 21 games for Woking in the 2018–19 season, including a late appearance as a substitute for Jake Hyde in the play-off final victory over Welling United that secured promotion into the National League. He was released by Oxford at the end of the 2018–19 season.

=== Millwall ===
Bradbury signed for Championship club Millwall. He was a regular in Kevin Nugent's under-23 team. On 31 January 2020, he moved on loan to League Two club Morecambe until the end of the 2019–20 season. He was released by Millwall at the end of the 2019–20 season. He began training with Port Vale in August 2020.

=== Return to non-league ===
In August 2020 he signed for Oxford City. On 2 April 2022, Bradbury signed for National League South side Welling United.

On 27 June 2022, Bradbury agreed to join Gosport Borough ahead of the 2022–23 campaign. He moved to Dorchester Town in October 2022.

On 10 March 2023, Bradbury joined Dartford until the end of the 2022–23 season. The deal was made permanent at the end of the season.

On 16 January 2024, Bradbury joined Farnborough.

On 28 March 2024, he joined Isthmian League Premier Division side, Chatham Town.

On 21 May 2024, he rejoined Southern Premier League side Havant & Waterlooville, this time on a permanent basis.

On 20 November 2025, Bradbury joined Southern League Division One South side, Shaftesbury. He joined Hanwell Town in February 2026.

== Career statistics ==
As of match played 25 April 2026

Appearances and goals by club, season and competition
Club	Season	League			FA Cup		EFL Cup		Other		Total	
Club	Season	Division	Apps	Goals	Apps	Goals	Apps	Goals	Apps	Goals	Apps	Goals
Portsmouth	2016–17	League One	0	0	0	0	0	0	0	0	0	0
Havant & Waterlooville (loan)	2016–17	Isthmian League Premier Division	1	0	0	0	—		0	0	1	0
Watford	2017–18	Premier League	0	0	0	0	0	0	0	0	0	0
Watford	2018–19	Premier League	0	0	0	0	0	0	0	0	0	0
Watford	Total		0	0	0	0	0	0	0	0	0	0
St Albans City (loan)	2017–18	National League South	9	2	0	0	—		2 (Note: Appearance(s) in FA Trophy)	0	11	2
Hungerford Town (loan)	2018–19	National League South	1	1	0	0	—		0	0	1	1
Oxford United	2018–19	League One	1	0	—		0	0	1 (Note: Appearance(s) in EFL Trophy)	0	2	0
Hungerford Town (loan)	2018–19	National League South	7	1	0	0	—		0	0	7	1
Woking (loan)	2018–19	National League South	17	3	2	3	—		2 (Note: One appearance in the Surrey Senior Cup and one appearance in the National League South play-offs)	0	21	6
Millwall	2019–20	Championship	0	0	0	0	0	0	0	0	0	0
Morecambe (loan)	2019–20	League Two	3	0	0	0	0	0	0	0	3	0
Oxford City	2020–21	National League South	15	8	5	3	—		3	0	23	11
Oxford City	2021–22	National League South	23	7	1	0	—		1	0	25	7
Oxford City	Total		38	15	6	3	—		4	0	48	18
Welling United	2021–22	National League South	8	2	—		—		—		8	2
Gosport Borough	2022–23	Southern League Premier Division South	10	3	0	0	—		0	0	10	3
Dorchester Town	2022–23	Southern League Premier Division South	14	4	0	0	—		0	0	14	4
Dartford (loan)	2022–23	National League South	9	5	—		—		1 (Note: One appearance and one goal in the National League South Play-Offs.)	1	10	6
Dartford	2023–24	National League South	22	5	0	0	—		1 (Note: One appearance in the London Senior Cup)	0	23	5
Farnborough	2023–24	National League South	10	0	—		—		—		10	0
Chatham Town	2023–24	Isthmian League Premier Division	6	2	—		—		2 (Note: Two appearances in the Isthmian League Premier Division Play-Offs.)	0	8	2
Havant & Waterlooville	2024–25	Southern League Premier Division South	27	12	2	2	—		3	0	32	14
Havant & Waterlooville	2025–26	Southern League Premier Division South	6	1	0	0	—		2	1	8	2
Havant & Waterlooville	Total		33	13	2	2	—		5	1	40	16
Shaftesbury	2025–26	Southern League Division One South	11	6	—		—		—		11	6
Hanwell Town	2025–26	Southern League Premier Division South	16	3	—		—		—		16	3
Career total			226	66	10	8	0	0	18	2	254	76

== Honours ==
Woking

- National League South play-offs: 2018–19
