= Christian Kabasele =

Congolese-born Belgian footballer (born 1991)

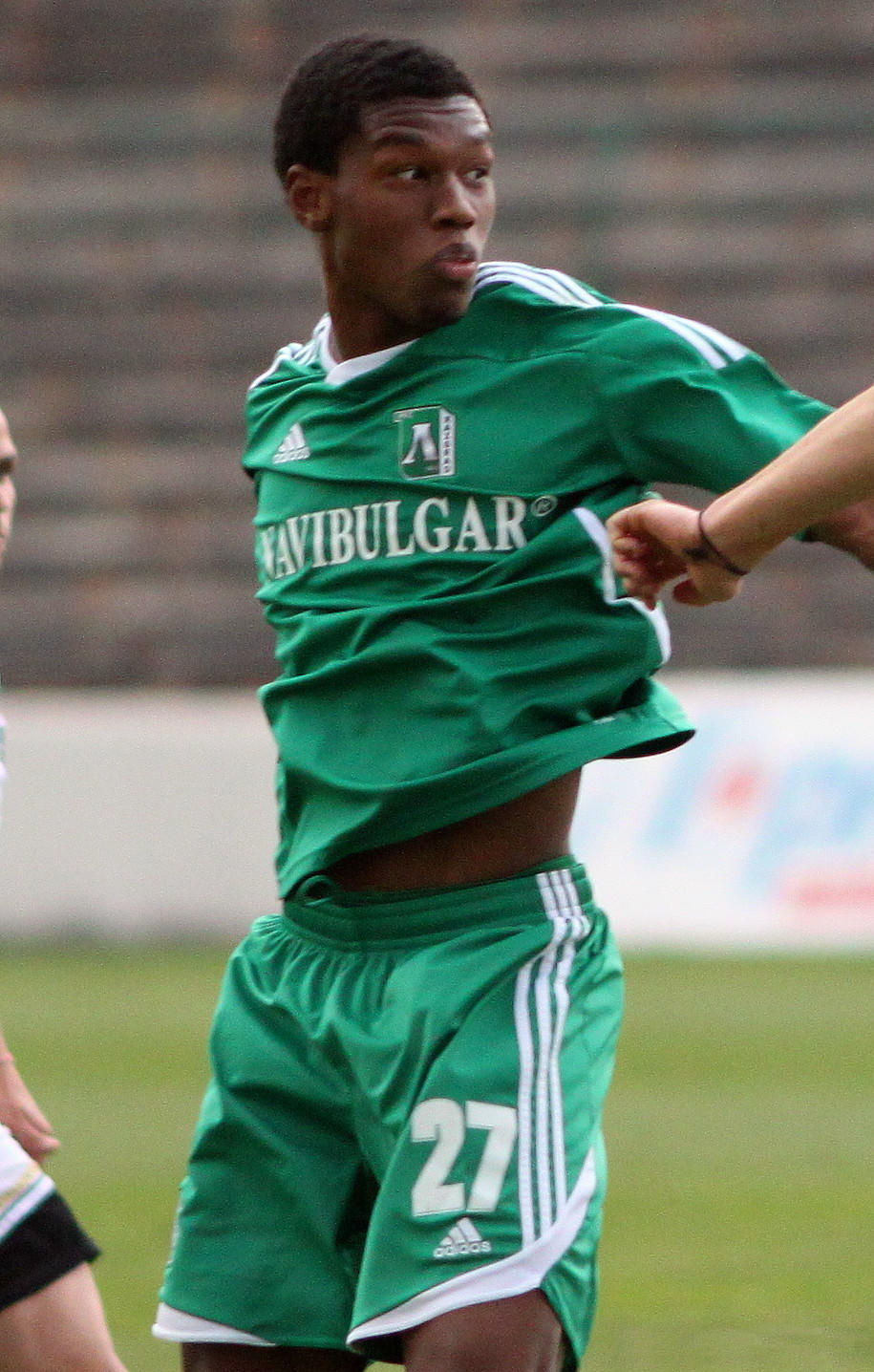
- Kabasele with Ludogorets Razgrad in 2012

Personal information
- Full name: Christian Kabasele
- Date of birth: 24 February 1991 (age 35)
- Place of birth: Lubumbashi, Zaire
- Height: 1.87 m (6 ft 2 in)
- Position: Centre-back

Team information
- Current team: Udinese
- Number: 27

Youth career
- –2008: Eupen

Senior career*
Years	Team	Apps	(Gls)
2008–2011	Eupen	9	(0)
2011	→ Mechelen (loan)	4	(1)
2011–2012	Ludogorets Razgrad	11	(3)
2012–2014	Eupen	41	(6)
2014–2016	Genk	76	(6)
2016–2023	Watford	153	(6)
2023–	Udinese	59	(6)

International career
2009	Belgium U18	1	(0)
2009–2010	Belgium U19	10	(5)
2010	Belgium U20	1	(0)
2011	Belgium U21	1	(0)
2016–2017	Belgium	2	(0)
- * Club domestic league appearances and goals as of 25 May 2026

Christian Kabasele (born 24 February 1991) is a professional footballer who plays as a centre-back for Serie A club Udinese.

Born in Zaire, Kabasele played for the Belgium national team, representing the nation at UEFA Euro 2016.

== Club career ==
=== K.A.S. Eupen ===
Kabasele began his football career at RFC Chaudfontaine when he was seven years old. Kabasele then joined Eupen at thirteen years old where they converted him from playing in a striker position to a defender position. While progressing through the youth system at the club, he said: "My best year was with the U16, I scored 29 times in 29 games. I was captain of the team at Eupen, while I was a year younger than the rest. The national youth coaches followed me, Standard informed me several times. even then I was too timid to take that step. In the meantime, Eupen had quickly transferred me to the reserve team and the A-team, partly to keep me satisfied."

After progressing through the youth system at Eupen, Kabasele was promoted to the first team ahead of the 2008–09 season and signed a four–year contract with them. He made his debut for the club, starting a match and played 81 minutes before being substituted, in a 3–0 loss against Lierse on 12 October 2008. Kabasele then found his playing time, mostly from the substitute bench. At the end of the 2008–09 season, he went on to make five appearances in all competitions. Following this, it was announced on 7 June 2009 that Kabasele signed a contract with Eupen, keeping him until 2013.

Having spent most of the 2009–10 season on the sidelines, Kabasele then made two appearances for Eupen, as they were promoted to Belgian Pro League. He then made five appearances for the side throughout the first half of the 2010–11 season.

=== KV Mechelen (loan) ===
On 27 January 2011, Mechelen confirmed Kabasele has joined on loan until the end of the season.

Kabasele made his debut on 12 February 2011 in a 3–1 home win against Westerlo, coming on as a substitute for Jonathan Wilmet. He scored his first league goal for Mechelen in a 2–1 away victory against Lierse on 8 April 2011. His next two appearances then came from the substitute bench, playing both matches against Cercle Brugge. As a result of his lack of playing time at the end of the 2010–11 season, Kabasele made four appearances and scoring once for KV Mechelen in all competitions.

=== Ludogorets Razgrad ===
On 22 August 2011, Kabasele joined Bulgarian club Ludogorets Razgrad on a three-year contract for an undisclosed fee. Upon joining the club, he was given a number twenty–seven shirt for the side.

Kabasele didn't make an appearance for Ludogorets Razgrad until making his debut for the club against Lokomotiv Sofia on 5 November 2011, coming on as an 82nd-minute substitute, and setting up the Ludogorets Razgrad's fourth goal of the game for Stanislav Genchev, in a 4–0 win. Two weeks later on 19 November 2011, Kabasele opened his account for the club, scoring a last-minute goal in a 2–0 home win over Kaliakra Kavarna in an A PFG match. After two more goals for Ludogorets Razgrad in the Bulgarian Cup, he then scored twice for the club, having come on as a second-half substitute, in a 5–0 win against Svetkavitsa Targovishte on 18 March 2012. A month later on 11 April 2012, Kabasele scored his sixth goal for the club in the Bulgarian Cup semi–finals against Septemvri Simitli, winning 4–1. He then helped Ludogorets Razgrad win both the league and the Bulgarian Cup. Despite being on the sidelines on four occasions throughout the 2011–12 season, Kabasele remained in the first team for the club, as he made fourteen appearances and scoring six times in all competitions. Following this, Ludogorets Razgrad said they decided to let Kabasele leave the club ahead of the 2012–13 season.

=== K.A.S. Eupen (second spell) ===
On 16 August 2012, Kabasele re-joined his first team Eupen on a two-year contract.

Kabasele made his Eupen debut, starting the whole game, in a 1–0 win against Dessel Sport in the opening game of the season. He then set up the club's first goal of the game, in a 2–1 loss against FC Brussels on 21 September 2012. After being absent on two occasions between September and October, Kabasele scored his first goal for Eupen, as well as, setting up the club's second goal of the game, in a 3–0 win against Westerlo on 2 November 2012. Three weeks later on 24 November 2012, he scored his second goal for Eupen, in a 3–2 win against Oudenaarde. His third goal for the club then came on 12 January 2013, in a 2–1 win against K.S.K. Heist. Kabasele scored his fourth goal for Eupen on 13 April 2013 in a 4–1 win against Oudenaarde. Although starting out of the defending position, he played in the striker position along the way, becoming a first team regular for the club. Despite being absent later in the 2012–13 season, Kabasele made 27 appearances and scored four times for Eupen.

At the start of the 2013–14 season, Kabasele started the season well when he helped Eupen keep four clean sheets in the first five league matches of the season. He scored his first goal of the season on 18 October 2013 in a 1–1 draw against Lommel United. His second goal of the season came on 8 February 2014, in a 2–0 win against ASV Geel. Kabasele continued to regain his first team place, playing in the centre–back position. Despite being absent at least seven occasions throughout the 2013–14 season, he went on to make twenty–nine appearances and scoring two times in all competitions.

=== Genk ===
It was announced on 9 January 2014 that Kabasele would be joining Genk at the end of the 2013–14 season.

Kabasele made his Genk debut, starting the whole game, in a 1–1 draw against Cercle Brugge on 2 August 2014. After making his debut for the club, he said: "I am not dissatisfied with my debut, but there are still things that could be better. My man-covering needs to be tightened up and the cooperation with Kara is not optimal yet, but that is a matter of time." Since making his debut for Genk, Kabasele quickly established himself in the starting eleven for the side, playing in the centre–back position. He scored his first goal for the club on 28 October 2014 in a 3–0 win against Lierse. Kabasele then helped Genk three out of the four clean sheets between 23 November 2014 and 13 December 2014, during which, he was suspended for picking up five yellow cards and scored on his return, in a 3–0 win against K.V. Kortrijk. His performance saw him extend his contract until 2018. Since returning from suspension, Kabasele continued to regain his team place in the starting eleven for the side, playing in the centre–back position, for the rest of the 2014–15 season. In his first season at Genk, he made 35 appearances and scoring twice in all competitions.

At the start of the 2015–16 season, Kabasele established himself in the starting eleven for the side, playing in the centre–back position. He then helped Genk keep two consecutive clean sheets between 28 August 2015 and 13 September 2015 against Charleroi and Anderlecht. Kabasele scored his first goal of the season and captained the side for the first time, in a 5–2 win against Dessel Sport in the sixth round of the Belgian Cup on 23 September 2015. However, in a follow–up match against K.V. Kortrijk, he was subjected to a racist chant from the supporters of the opposition team, prompting an accusation against them. In a follow–up match against Standard Liège, Kabasele scored his second goal of the season and celebrated his goal in response to the racism incident in a previous match, winning 3–0. He then captained Genk three consecutive times between 8 November 2015 and 28 November 2015 against Club Brugge, Oud-Heverlee Leuven and Gent. This was followed up by keeping three consecutive clean sheets against Anderlecht, Westerlo and Sint-Truidense. In the January transfer window, Kabasele was linked with a move away from the club, but he responded to the transfer speculation by stating his desire to stay. Amid the transfer speculation, Kabasele then scored two goals in two matches between 23 January 2016 and 30 January 2016 against K.V. Mechelen and K.V. Kortrijk. Two weeks later on 13 February 2016, he scored his fifth goal of the season, in a 6–1 win against Waasland-Beveren. Kabasele helped Genk finish fourth place in the league to qualify for the Testmatches Europa League against Charleroi. He played in both legs of the league's Testmatches Europa League against Charleroi, as they won 5–3 on aggregate to earn a place in the next UEFA Europa League' season. Despite minor injury setbacks throughout the 2015–16 season, Kabasele went on to make forty–six appearances and scoring five times in all competitions. For his performance, he was awarded the club's Player of the Year Award.

=== Watford ===
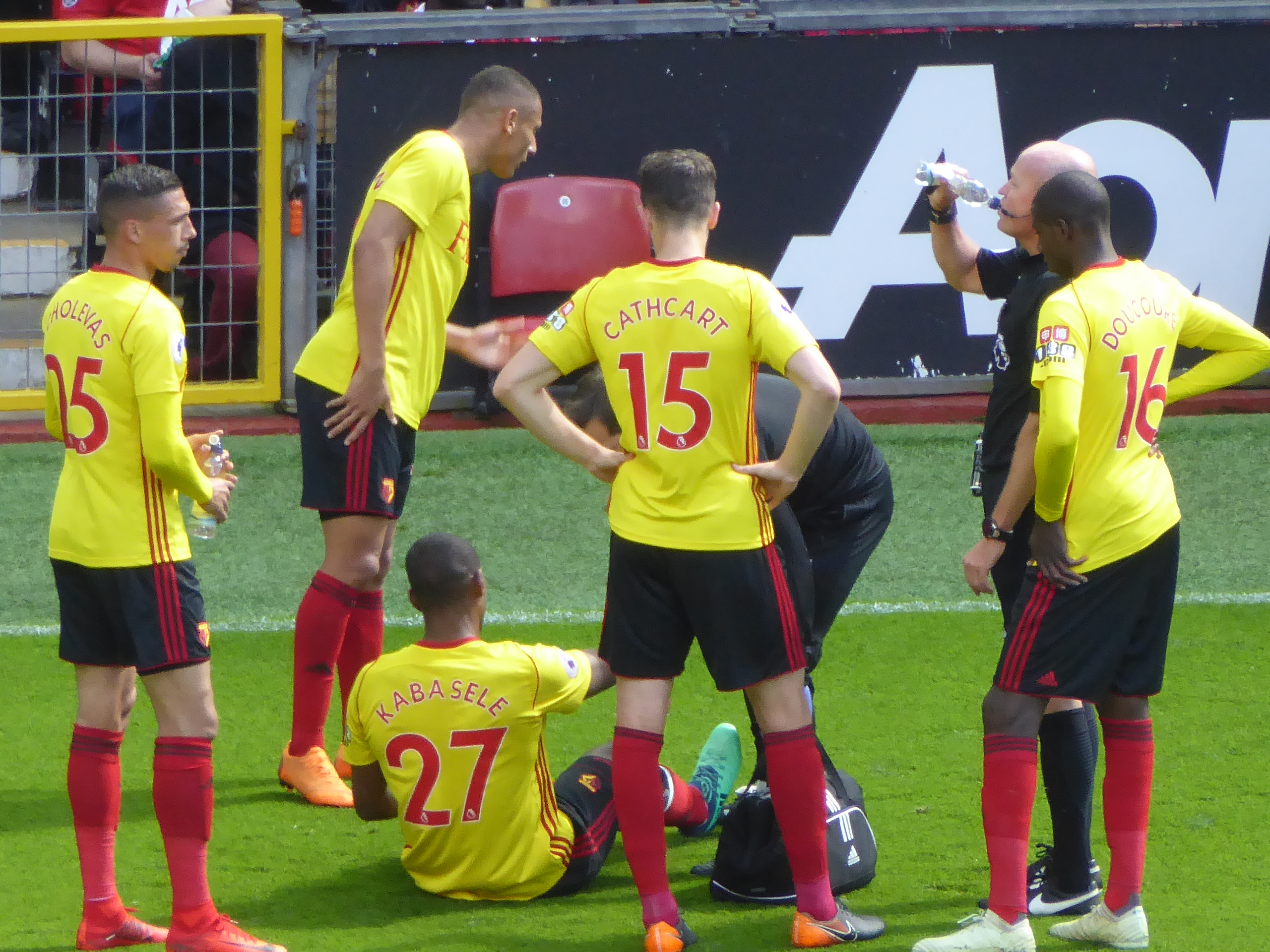
Kabasele (27) on the floor receiving treatment from Watford's doctor during a match against Manchester United on 13 May 2018.

On 1 July 2016, Kabasele signed for Premier League side Watford for a reported £5.8 million, signing a five–year contract. Upon joining the club, he was given a number twenty–seven shirt.

However, Kabasele's absent in the first two league matches led to a transfer speculation that Udinese was making a move for him. Amid to the transfer move, he made his Watford debut, starting the whole game and playing 120 minutes, as the club lost 2–1 against Gillingham in the second round of the League Cup. Four days later on 27 August 2016, Kabasele made his league debut for Watford, starting a match and playing 52 minutes before being substituted, in a 3–1 loss against Arsenal. By the end of August, he ended up staying at the after Manager Walter Mazzarri wanted to keep him at the club. Since joining Watford, Kabasele found himself out of the starting eleven, due to competitions in the centre–backs and his own injury concern. He scored his first goal for Watford in a 3–1 defeat to West Bromwich Albion on 3 December 2016. Following the injury of Nordin Amrabat, Kabasele started in the right midfield position and played the whole game, in a 2–0 loss against Stoke City on 3 January 2017. He then scored his second goal for the club, in a 2–0 win against Burton Albion in the first round of the FA Cup. Kabasele started in the next two matches, playing in the right–midfield position, and scored against AFC Bournemouth on 21 January 2017. However, he was plagued by injuries for the next three months. Kabasele returned from injury on 8 April 2017 as a late substitute in a 4–0 loss against Tottenham Hotspur. But his return was short–lived when he suffered an injury and substituted in the 37th minute, in a 1–0 loss against Everton on 12 May 2017. Kabasele made 18 appearances and scored three times in all competitions during the season.

Having missed the opening game of the 2017–18 season due to injury, Kabasele made his first appearance of the season, starting a match and playing 81 minutes before being substituted, in a 2–0 win against AFC Bournemouth on 19 August 2017. He then followed up in the next two matches by keeping a clean sheets against Brighton & Hove Albion and Southampton. Since returning to the first team from injury, Kabasele continued to regain his first team place, playing in the centre–back position. His progress in his second season at Watford was praised by Manager Marco Silva. Kabasele scored his first goal of the season on 5 November 2017 in a 3–2 loss against Everton. He then scored his second goal for Watford, in a 1–1 draw against Tottenham Hotspur on 2 December 2017. This lasted until February when Kabasele suffered a hamstring injury that kept him out for two months. He returned to the starting line–up against Crystal Palace on 21 April 2018 in a 0–0 draw. Kabasele then started in the remaining matches of the 2017–18 season before suffering a knee injury, resulting in his substitution in the 21st minute, as Watford lost 1–0 against Manchester United in the last game of the season. At the end of the 2017–18 season, he went on to make thirty–one appearances and scoring two times in all competitions. Following this, Kabasele was awarded the club's Community Ambassador of the Year.

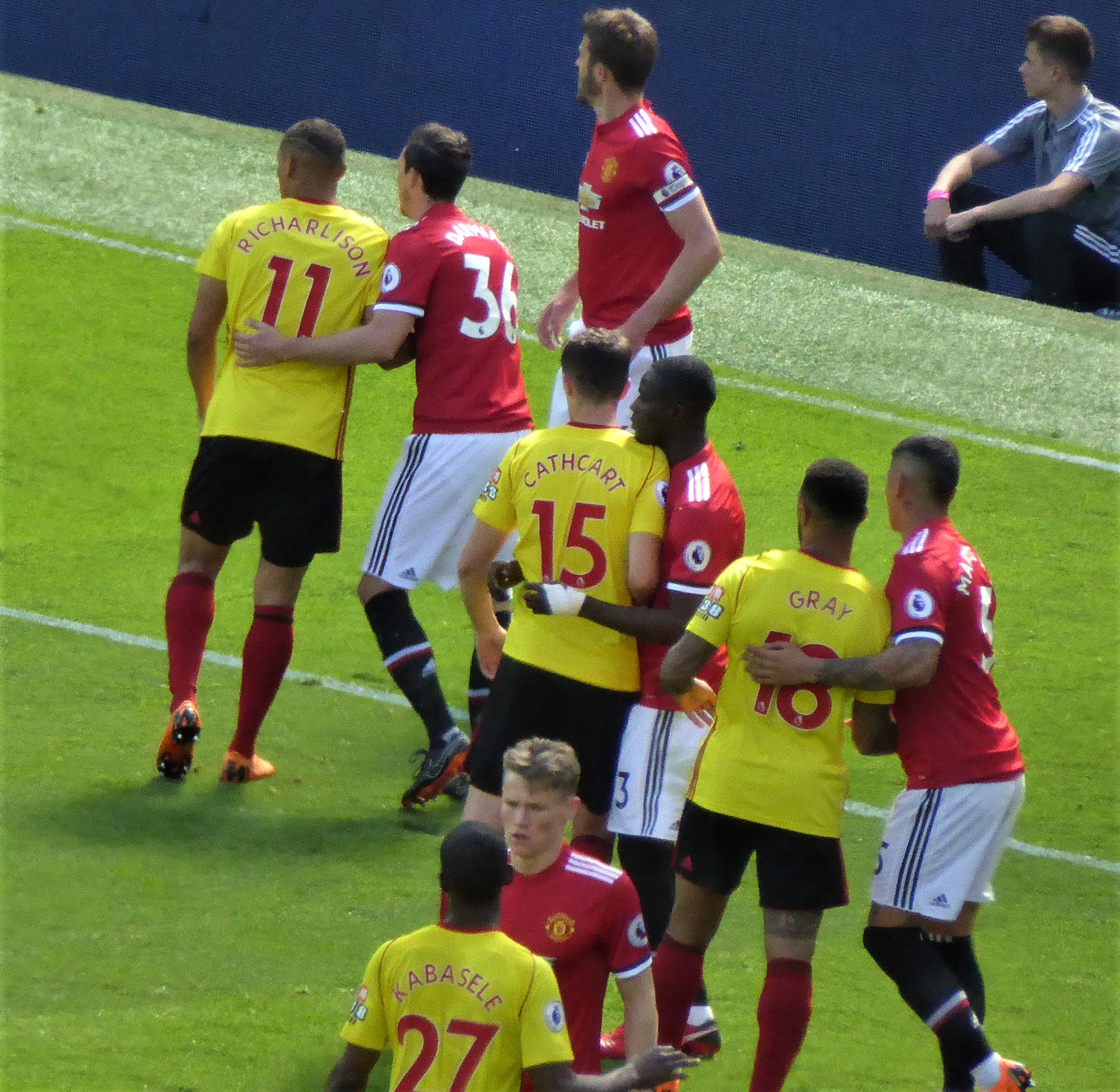
Kabasele being marked by Scott McTominay during a match against Manchester United on 13 May 2018.

At the start of the 2018–19 season, Kabasele started in the first seven league matches, as he helped Watford off to a winning start. This led Kabasele stating that experience is helping him establish as a leader. However, he was sent–off for a straight red card in the 81st minute, having come on as a substitute four minutes earlier, as the club lost 4–2 in penalty shootout against Tottenham Hotspur in the third round of the League Cup. Following this, Kabasele had his suspension rescinded. A week later on 6 October 2018 against Bournemouth, he was sent–off once again for a second bookable offence, as Watford lost 4–0. Following his return, Kabasele was placed on the substitute bench for the next four matches before returning to the starting line–up, in a 2–1 loss against Manchester City on 4 December 2018. He then started in the next four matches before suffering an injury after 16 minutes of a match against Chelsea on 26 December 2018, missing four matches. Kabasele returned to the starting line–up against Burnley on 19 January 2019. However, his return was short–lived when he found himself out of the starting eleven for the rest of the 2018–19 season. Despite this, Kabasele started five matches in the last remaining months of the season. During the 2018–19 season, he made 23 appearances in all competitions.

Kabasele made his first appearance of the 2019–20 season, coming against Coventry City in the second round of the League Cup, starting the whole game and setting up Watford's third goal of the game, in a 3–0 win. Having appeared on the substitute bench at the start of the 2019–20 season, he started eight matches in the first four months of the season. However, Kabasele was sent–off for a second bookable offence, as the club won 2–0 against Norwich City on 8 November 2019. After serving a suspension and then sidelined with an injury, he returned to the starting line–up against Crystal Palace on 7 December 2019 and kept a clean sheet, in a 0–0 draw. Kabasele played a role against Manchester United on 22 December 2019, setting up the club's first goal of the game, in a 2–0 win. However, he was sent–off in the 71st minute for a professional foul, in a 2–1 win against Wolverhampton Wanderers on 1 January 2020. Shortly, it was reported on 9 January 2020 that Kabasele signed a contract extension with Watford. Kabasele continued as a first-team regular, and by the time the season was suspended because of the COVID-19 pandemic, he had made 19 league appearances. Kabasele remained an integral part of the team once the season resumed behind closed doors, and set up a late equaliser for Craig Dawson to settle a draw on 20 June 2020. However, Watford were relegated to the Championship following a 3–2 loss against Arsenal in the last game of the season. During the 2019–20 season, he made 31 appearances in all competitions.

=== Udinese ===
On 25 July 2023, Kabasele joined Serie A club Udinese for an undisclosed fee.

== International career ==
Kabasele was born in the Democratic Republic of the Congo, but moved to Belgium at a young age. This made him eligible to play for either Belgium or DR Congo as he holds both citizenships.

=== Youth career ===
Kabasele made his only Belgium U18 appearance against Austria U18 on 8 April 2009, winning 3–1. Later in 2009, he was called up to the Belgium U19 squad, making his debut for the U19 side, in a 2–1 win against Germany U19 on 5 September 2009. Kabasele then scored his first Belgium U19 goal, in a 1–0 win against France U19 on 12 October 2009. He then scored a brace on two occasions, coming against Kazakhstan U19 and Luxembourg U19. Kabasele went on to make ten appearances and scored five times for the U19 side.

Kabasele made his only Belgium U20 appearance, coming against Malta U20 on 31 March 2010, in a 1–0 win. In February 2011, Kabasele was called up to Belgium U21 for the first time, making his only appearance for the U21 side, coming against Greece U21 on 27 March 2011.

=== Senior career ===
Kabasele revealed that he rejected a chance to represent DR Congo after being offered a chance to play in the Africa Cup of Nations, citing his desire to prefer representing Belgium instead.

Kabasele was named as part of the senior Belgium squad for UEFA Euro 2016. He was an unused substitute, as Belgium reached the quarterfinals in the tournament. Kabasele made his debut for the national team in a friendly against the Netherlands on 9 November 2016. A year later on 14 November 2017, he made his second appearance for the national side, starting the whole game, in a 1–0 win against Japan.

In May 2018, Kabasele was named in Belgium's preliminary squad for the 2018 World Cup in Russia. However, he did not make the final 23. Following this, Kabasele's performance at the start of the 2018–19 season led Manager Roberto Martínez to monitor him in hopes of calling him up to the national team, while Kabasele, himself, said he would do all he can to earn a recall. Kabasele then was called up to the national team on two more times by the end of the year but appeared as an unused substitute.

== Personal life ==
Born in Lubumbashi, Zaire to a Congolese father and mother who has a white father of unclear origin and Congolese mother. Kabasele moved to Belgium with his parents and his older brother in search of a better life. His brother is a footballer, playing amateur football in Belgium. His father worked at the airport while his mother worked at the care. He grew up in Liège.

Growing up, Kabasele supported Arsenal and Standard Liège. He began playing football at a young age, due to "having too much energy and was not so social".

Kabasele speaks German, French, Dutch and English. He is married and has a son. Kabasele spoke out about his country, Congo, saying: "I feel sad not only because of the war, but the general situation in Congo. It's so sad to have a rich country and the people there being so poor. It's not normal. They don't have to be afraid of what could be the consequences if they don't vote for this guy or that guy. They need to have the courage. They need to respect the final decision and not, like so many times [in the past], go on the streets and create some chaos. But first of all they need to vote with courage."

In October 2017, Kabasele spoke about his use of social media, saying: "I'm only Christian Kabasele, I'm not the football player so on Twitter I'm just a normal person. It's good for me and the fans to have that kind of interaction, but I'm just myself." In April 2019, he (and Watford team-mates Adrian Mariappa and Troy Deeney) were subjected to racist comments on social media. Kabasele spoke out against racism, where he experienced the racial abuse from his time at Bulgaria and called for tougher action. Kabasele said in an interview with CNN that racism online 'is worse' than incidents in stadium.

In the wake of COVID-19 pandemic, Kabasele posted a message with RTBF, urging people to stay at home.

== Career statistics ==
=== Club ===
As of match played 2 March 2026

Appearances and goals by club, season and competition
Club	Season	League			National cup		League cup		Europe		Total	
Club	Season	Division	Apps	Goals	Apps	Goals	Apps	Goals	Apps	Goals	Apps	Goals
Eupen	2008–09	Belgian Second Division	3	0	0	0	—		—		3	0
Eupen	2009–10	Belgian Second Division	1	0	0	0	—		—		1	0
Eupen	2010–11	Belgian Pro League	3	0	2	0	—		—		5	0
Eupen	Total		7	0	2	0	—		—		9	0
Mechelen (loan)	2010–11	Belgian Pro League	4	1	0	0	—		—		4	1
Ludogorets Razgrad	2011–12	A Group	11	3	3	3	—		—		14	6
Eupen	2012–13	Belgian Pro League	26	4	1	0	—		—		27	4
Eupen	2013–14	Belgian Pro League	26	2	4	0	—		—		30	2
Eupen	Total		52	6	5	0	—		—		57	6
Genk	2014–15	Belgian Pro League	34	2	1	0	—		—		35	2
Genk	2015–16	Belgian Pro League	42	4	4	1	—		—		46	5
Genk	Total		76	6	5	1	—		—		81	7
Watford	2016–17	Premier League	16	2	1	1	1	0	—		18	3
Watford	2017–18	Premier League	28	2	2	0	1	0	—		31	2
Watford	2018–19	Premier League	21	0	1	0	1	0	—		23	0
Watford	2019–20	Premier League	27	0	1	0	3	0	—		31	0
Watford	2020–21	Championship	20	1	0	0	1	0	—		21	1
Watford	2021–22	Premier League	16	0	0	0	1	0	—		17	0
Watford	2022–23	Championship	25	1	0	0	0	0	—		25	1
Watford	Total		153	6	5	1	8	0	—		166	7
Udinese	2023–24	Serie A	13	1	1	0	—		—		14	1
Udinese	2024–25	Serie A	16	2	1	0	—		—		17	2
Udinese	2025–26	Serie A	20	3	1	0	—		—		21	3
Udinese	Total		49	6	3	0	—		—		52	6
Career total			352	28	23	5	8	0	0	0	383	33

== Honours ==
Ludogorets Razgrad

- Bulgarian A Group: 2011–12
- Bulgarian Cup: 2011–12

Watford

- FA Cup runner-up: 2018–19
