= Morley's =

British fast food chain

- Industry: Fast food
- Founded: 1985; 41 years ago
- Headquarters: Brockley, London, England
- Number of locations: 94 (as of June 2024)
- Area served: London
- Key people: Kannalingam "Indran" Selvendran (founder)
- Products: Fried chicken, burgers and spare ribs
- Website: morleyschicken.com

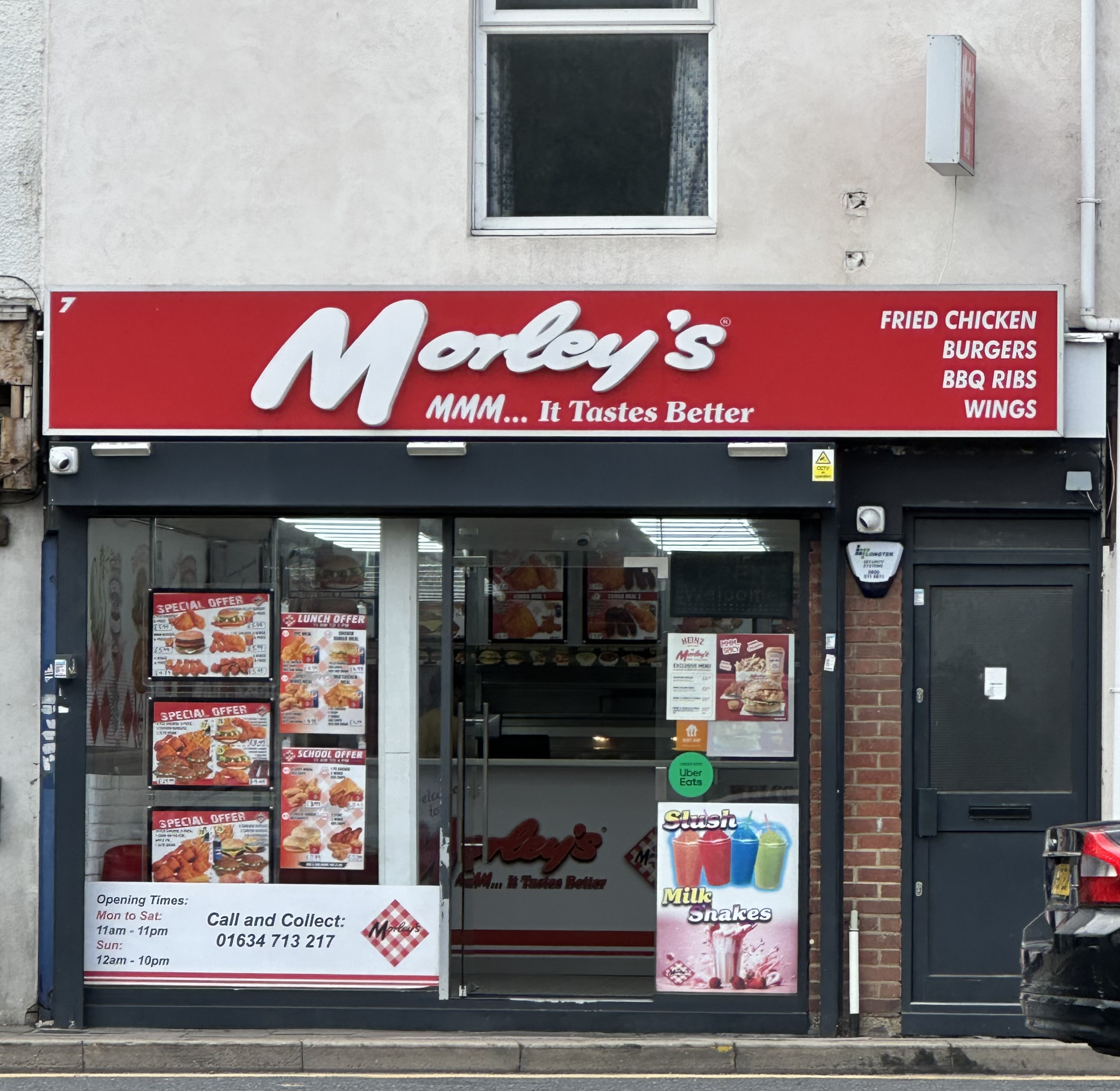
Morley's, Strood High Street, Kent

Morley's is a fast food chain based in the United Kingdom, selling fried chicken, burgers and spare ribs. Morley's was founded in 1985, by Sri Lankan Tamil immigrant Kannalingam "Indran" Selvendran (1951–2002). The first Morley's location was in Sydenham, south-east London.

After Selvendran's death in 2002, his son Shan Selvendran took over the business. Aiming to become the largest chicken chain in the country, Selvendran began the expansion of the franchise in 2018, opening a number of locations throughout London. In 2020, Morley's opened two branches in the North East towns of Stockton on Tees and Hartlepool. They also opened branches in Brick Lane, Whitechapel, Finsbury Park and Acton in West London. By December 2021, the chain had almost 90 branches, though almost entirely in South London. According to The Telegraph they are "a chain unknown north of the river".

In 2022, former professional footballer Jerome Sinclair became the owner of a Morley's franchise in Dudley Road, Birmingham.
