= 1985–86 Oxford United F.C. season =

English football club season

Oxford United
1985–86 season
- Chairman: Robert Maxwell
- Manager: Maurice Evans
- Stadium: Manor Ground
- First Division: 18th
- FA Cup: Third round
- League Cup: Winners
- Top goalscorer: League: John Aldridge (23); All: John Aldridge (31)
Home colours	Away colours

During the 1985–86 English football season, Oxford United competed in the Football League First Division, after promotion from the Second Division the previous season. They secured survival with an 18th-place finish, and won the League Cup, the first major trophy win of their history.

== Season summary ==
Despite the departure of manager Jim Smith, who left for Queens Park Rangers after guiding Oxford to two successive promotions, Oxford United narrowly survived their first ever season in English football's top flight. They required a win in their last game of the season to avoid relegation, which they achieved by beating Arsenal 3–0 at the Manor Ground. The club had greater success in the League Cup, reaching the final at Wembley, where they beat Queens Park Rangers 3–0 to win their first ever major trophy. Because of the ban on English teams competing in European competitions as a result of the Heysel disaster, Oxford were unable to compete in the UEFA Cup the following season.

== Kit ==
Oxford United's kits were manufactured by English company Umbro, who introduced a new home kit for the season. Wang Computers became the new kit sponsors. The home kit featured both navy shorts (for the first time since 1950) and navy socks (for the first time since 1935).

== Squad ==
Note: Flags indicate national team as defined under FIFA eligibility rules; some limited exceptions apply. Players may hold more than one non-FIFA nationality.

Pos.	Nation	Player
GK	ENG	Steve Hardwick
GK	ENG	Alan Judge
DF	ENG	Gary Briggs
DF	ENG	Malcolm Shotton
DF	ENG	John Trewick
DF	WAL	Neil Slatter
DF	SCO	Bobby McDonald
DF	IRL	Dave Langan
MF	ENG	Kevin Brock

Pos.	Nation	Player
MF	ENG	Trevor Hebberd
MF	ENG	Mark Jones
MF	ENG	Les Phillips
MF	ENG	Peter Rhoades-Brown
MF	IRL	Ray Houghton
FW	ENG	Andy Thomas
FW	WAL	Jeremy Charles
FW	NIR	Billy Hamilton
FW	IRL	John Aldridge

== Results ==
=== First Division ===
17 August 1985	West Bromwich Albion	1–1	Oxford United	West Bromwich
	Varadi		McDonald	Stadium: The Hawthorns

7 September 1985	Manchester United	3–0	Oxford United	Manchester
15:00 BST	Barnes; Robson; Whiteside			Stadium: Old Trafford; Attendance: 51,820

11 January 1986	Oxford United	1–3	Manchester United	Oxford
	Leworthy		Gibson; Hughes; Whiteside	Stadium: Manor Ground; Attendance: 13,280
