= 1981–82 Birmingham City F.C. season =

Birmingham City F.C.
1981–82 season
- Chairman: Keith Coombs
- Manager: Jim Smith; (until February 1982); Ron Saunders
- Ground: St Andrew's
- Football League First Division: 16th
- FA Cup: Third round (eliminated by Ipswich Town)
- League Cup: Second round (eliminated by Nottingham Forest)
- Top goalscorer: League: Tony Evans (15); All: Tony Evans (16)
- Highest home attendance: 32,817 vs Aston Villa, 20 February 1982
- Lowest home attendance: 10,715 vs Middlesbrough, 6 February 1982
- Average home league attendance: 17,116
Home colours

The 1981–82 Football League season was Birmingham City Football Club's 79th in the Football League and their 47th in the First Division. They finished in 16th position in the 22-team division. They lost in their opening match in both cup competitions: to Ipswich Town in the third round proper of the 1981–82 FA Cup and to Nottingham Forest in the second round of the League Cup.

Twenty-four players appeared in at least one first-team game, and Dutch international midfielder Toine van Mierlo made most appearances, with 43 of the possible 45. There were 14 different goalscorers; Tony Evans was the club's leading scorer with 16 goals, of which 15 were scored in the league.

== Football League First Division ==
Date	League position	Opponents	Venue	Result	Score F–A	Scorers	Attendance
29 August 1981	20th	Everton	A	L	1–3	Van Mierlo	33,550
1 September 1981	17th	Ipswich Town	H	D	1–1	Evans	17,328
5 September 1981	12th	Nottingham Forest	H	W	4–3	Broadhurst, Evans, Whatmore 2	19,035
12 September 1981	18th	Middlesbrough	A	L	1–2	Whatmore	13,167
19 September 1981	8th	Manchester City	H	W	3–0	Evans 3	20,109
22 September 1981	13th	Arsenal	A	L	0–1		19,588
26 September 1981	14th	Aston Villa	A	D	0–0		41,098
3 October 1981	15th	West Ham United	H	D	2–2	Langan, Dillon	22,290
10 October 1981	11th	Southampton	H	W	4–0	Worthington 2, Whatmore 2	16,938
17 October 1981	11th	Manchester United	A	D	1–1	Worthington pen	48,800
24 October 1981	14th	Stoke City	A	L	0–1		15,399
31 October 1981	15th	West Bromwich Albion	H	D	3–3	Gemmill, Evans, Worthington pen	21,601
7 November 1981	13th	Brighton & Hove Albion	A	D	1–1	Evans	18,409
21 November 1981	15th	Wolverhampton Wanderers	H	L	0–3		18,671
28 November 1981	20th	Swansea City	A	L	0–1		15,096
5 December 1981	19th	Notts County	H	W	2–1	Evans 2 (1 pen)	11,914
5 January 1982	19th	Ipswich Town	A	L	2–3	Van Mierlo, Broadhurst	19,336
9 January 1982	19th	Nottingham Forest	A	L	1–2	Worthington	15,906
26 January 1982	19th	Coventry City	H	D	3–3	Broadhurst, Evans 2	13,023
30 January 1982	19th	Manchester City	A	L	2–4	Worthington 2	28,438
6 February 1982	19th	Middlesbrough	H	D	0–0		10,715
13 February 1982	19th	West Ham United	A	D	2–2	Whatmore, Van Mierlo	22,512
16 February 1982	17th	Sunderland	H	W	2–0	Van Mierlo, Worthington	10,863
20 February 1982	17th	Aston Villa	H	L	0–1		32,817
27 February 1982	17th	Southampton	A	L	1–3	Worthington pen	20,620
6 March 1982	17th	Manchester United	H	L	0–1		19,637
13 March 1982	17th	Stoke City	H	W	2–1	Curbishley, Hawker	12,018
20 March 1982	18th	West Bromwich Albion	A	D	1–1	Evans	20,936
23 March 1982	18th	Tottenham Hotspur	H	D	0–0		17,708
27 March 1982	17th	Brighton & Hove Albion	H	W	1–0	Harford	13,234
30 March 1982	17th	Liverpool	A	L	1–3	Harford	24,224
6 April 1982	17th	Everton	H	L	0–2		12,273
10 April 1982	19th	Leeds United	H	L	0–1		14,497
12 April 1982	20th	Sunderland	A	L	0–2		14,821
17 April 1982	20th	Wolverhampton Wanderers	A	D	1–1	Harford	18,964
24 April 1982	17th	Swansea City	H	W	2–1	Broadhurst, Harford	14,973
28 April 1982	16th	Tottenham Hotspur	A	D	1–1	Harford	25,470
1 May 1982	16th	Notts County	A	W	4–1	Phillips, Evans 2, Harford	10,704
4 May 1982	17th	Arsenal	H	L	0–1		13,428
8 May 1982	18th	Liverpool	H	L	0–1		26,381
12 May 1982	16th	Leeds United	A	D	3–3	Harford 2, Evans	18,583
15 May 1982	16th	Coventry City	A	W	1–0	Harford	15,925

=== League table (part) ===
Three points for a win were first awarded in the Football League in 1981–82.

Final First Division table (part)
Pos	Team	Pld	W	D	L	GF	GA	GD	Pts
14th	Coventry City	42	13	11	18	56	62	−6	50
15th	Notts County	42	13	8	21	61	69	−8	47
16th	Birmingham City	42	10	14	18	53	61	−8	44
17th	West Bromwich Albion	42	11	11	20	46	57	−11	44
18th	Stoke City	42	12	8	22	44	63	−19	44

=== Results summary ===
Overall								Home						Away					
Pld	W	D	L	GF	GA	GD	Pts	W	D	L	GF	GA	GD	W	D	L	GF	GA	GD
42	10	14	18	53	61	−8	44	8	6	7	29	25	+4	2	8	11	24	36	−12

== FA Cup ==
Round	Date	Opponents	Venue	Result	Score F–A	Scorers	Attendance
Third round	2 January 1982	Ipswich Town	H	L	2–3	Worthington pen, Curbishley	17,236

== League Cup ==
Round	Date	Opponents	Venue	Result	Score F–A	Scorers	Attendance
Second round 1st leg	6 October 1981	Nottingham Forest	H	L	2–3	Whatmore, Worthington	14,330
Second round 2nd leg	28 October 1981	Nottingham Forest	A	L	1–2	Evans	16,316

== Appearances and goals ==
Numbers in parentheses denote appearances made as a substitute.
Players with name in italics and marked * were on loan from another club for the whole of their season with Birmingham.
Players marked † left the club during the playing season.
Key to positions: GK – Goalkeeper; DF – Defender; MF – Midfielder; FW – Forward

Players' appearances and goals by competition
Pos.	Nat.	Name	League		FA Cup		League Cup		Total	
Pos.	Nat.	Name	Apps	Goals	Apps	Goals	Apps	Goals	Apps	Goals
GK	ENG	Tony Coton	15	0	1	0	0	0	16	0
GK	ENG	Roger Jones *	4	0	0	0	0	0	4	0
GK	ENG	Jeff Wealands	23	0	0	0	2	0	25	0
DF	ENG	Kevan Broadhurst	35	4	1	0	2	0	38	4
DF	ENG	Mark Dennis	17	0	1	0	1	0	19	0
DF	ENG	Phil Hawker	19 (1)	1	0	0	1	0	20 (1)	1
DF	IRL	Dave Langan	36	1	1	0	1	0	38	1
DF	ENG	Geoff Scott	14 (1)	0	0	0	0	0	14 (1)	0
DF	ENG	Colin Todd	19	0	1	0	2	0	22	0
DF	WAL	Pat Van Den Hauwe	30 (1)	0	0	1	0	0	31 (1)	0
MF	NED	Bud Brocken	17	0	0	0	2	0	19	0
MF	ENG	Alan Curbishley	29	1	1	1	0	0	30	2
MF	ENG	Kevin Dillon	35 (1)	1	1	0	2	0	38 (1)	1
MF	SCO	Archie Gemmill †	19	1	1	0	2	0	22	1
MF	ENG	Dave Linney	0 (1)	0	0	0	0	0	0 (1)	0
MF	ENG	Ian Handysides	8 (12)	0	0 (1)	0	0 (1)	0	8 (14)	0
MF	NED	Toine van Mierlo	40	4	1	0	2	0	43	4
MF	ENG	Les Phillips	7 (4)	1	0	0	0	0	7 (4)	1
MF	WAL	Byron Stevenson	12	0	0	0	0	0	12	0
FW	ENG	Tony Evans	29	15	1	0	1	1	31	16
FW	ENG	Mick Harford	12	9	0	0	0	0	12	9
FW	ENG	Duncan MacDowall	2	0	0	0	0	0	2	0
FW	ENG	Neil Whatmore	22 (2)	6	0	0	1	1	23 (2)	7
FW	ENG	Frank Worthington †	18 (2)	9	1	1	2	1	21 (2)	11

== See also ==
- Birmingham City F.C. seasons

== Sources ==
- Matthews, Tony (1995). Birmingham City: A Complete Record. Derby: Breedon Books. ISBN 978-1-85983-010-9.
- Matthews, Tony (2010). Birmingham City: The Complete Record. Derby: DB Publishing. ISBN 978-1-85983-853-2.
- For match dates, league positions and results: "Birmingham City 1981–1982 : Results". Statto Organisation. Archived from the original on 4 March 2016.
- For lineups, appearances, goalscorers and attendances: Matthews (2010), Complete Record, pp. 398–99.
