= List of Oxford United F.C. managers =

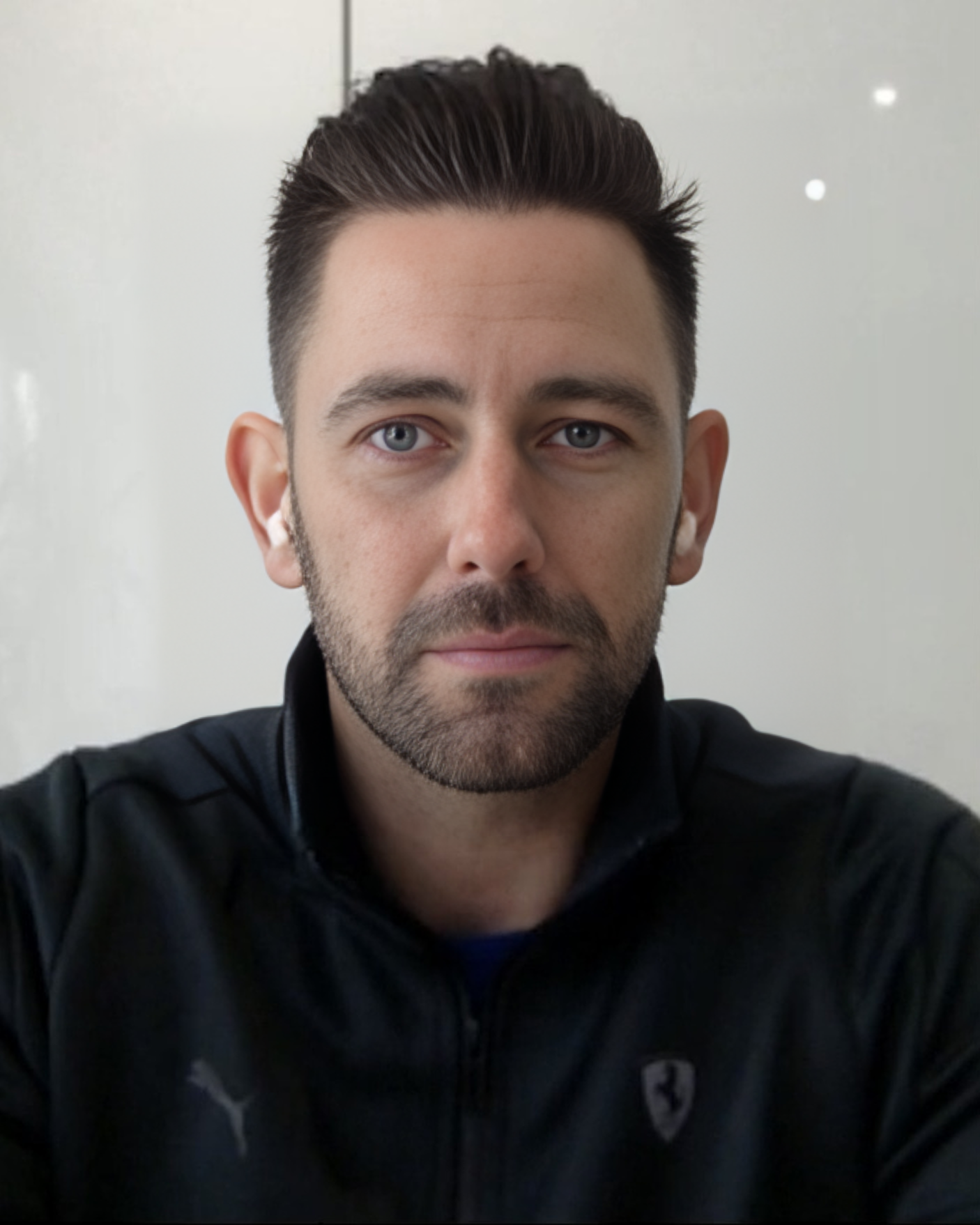
Former head coach Des Buckingham took Oxford United to the EFL Championship via the play-offs in May 2024.

The following is a list of Oxford United Football Club managers from 1949, when the club turned professional, to the present day. During this time the club has had 25 full-time managers, of whom three (Jim Smith, Denis Smith and Darren Patterson) have had more than one spell in the post, and eleven periods of caretaker-management. The first manager appointed was Harry Thompson in July 1949. Thompson was in charge for nine years, during which he led the team to the Southern League title in 1953, as well as the Southern League Cup in 1953 and 1954. He was dismissed in November 1958 and replaced by Arthur Turner. Turner, the longest-serving manager in the club's history with more than a decade in charge, led United to back-to-back Southern League titles, of which the second, in 1962, resulted in their election to the Football League. Promotion followed from the Fourth Division in 1965, and the club were crowned Third Division champions three years later. Turner left the club nine months after this success. Over the next 13 years, five managers took charge: Ron Saunders, Gerry Summers, Mick Brown, Bill Asprey and Ian Greaves. During Brown's four-year run, United were relegated back to the Third Division after eight years in the Second.

Jim Smith started his first spell as manager in 1982 and led Oxford into the top tier of English football after consecutive promotions as champions in 1984 and 1985. However, he moved to Queens Park Rangers before the 1985–86 season, so he never managed Oxford in the First Division. New manager, former chief scout Maurice Evans, had immediate success, winning the 1986 League Cup, beating his predecessor's new club in the final. For the next 24 years, the only manager to guide the club to promotion or silverware was Denis Smith, who won promotion from the Second Division in 1996. Ramón Díaz, the club's first non-British manager, took charge for five months between December 2004 and May 2005. Jim Smith returned as manager at the end of the 2005–06 season, shortly before Oxford United were relegated to the Football Conference after 44 years in the Football League.

Having missed out on promotion in the 2006–07 season, Smith resigned, and manager Darren Patterson was hired in November 2007. Patterson was sacked over a year later and was replaced by Chris Wilder, who won promotion back to the Football League by winning the 2010 Conference play-off final.

Wilder resigned in January 2014 and was announced as the new manager of Northampton Town the following day. He was replaced by Gary Waddock, who lasted four months, before himself being replaced by Michael Appleton. Appleton, having gained promotion to League One and led the club to two Wembley finals in the Football League Trophy, left the club after three seasons in charge to join Leicester City as their assistant manager. He was replaced by Pep Clotet, former assistant manager at Leeds United, in July 2017. Clotet was sacked on 22 January 2018, with a record of 12 wins from 36 matches in charge. After two months under the caretaker management of Derek Fazackerley, Karl Robinson was appointed by new owner Sumrith Thanakarnjanasuth on 22 March with United 15th in League One and only six points above the relegation zone.

Robinson was sacked in February 2023 after a run of poor results left the club just five points above the relegation zone. Coaches Craig Short, Leon Blackmore-Such, and Wayne Brown were put in temporary charge and oversaw two matches before Liam Manning was appointed on 11 March 2023. Manning left United on 7 November 2023 after just eight months and 29 games to join Bristol City.

First team coach Craig Short once again took temporary charge of the side while the search for Manning's successor took place. Short oversaw just one league game, a 3-2 victory at Leyton Orient and then on 16 November 2023, the club announced that former youth team goalkeeper Des Buckingham had been appointed as Head Coach.

As an Oxford United supporter himself, who grew up in the city, Buckingham's appointment was popular among supporters. Buckingham's style and approach took a while to bed in, culminating in a 5-0 defeat at Bolton Wanderers live on Sky Sports. He later cited this match as a turning point, after which he felt justified in making more significant changes to the side. Results significantly improved, and the team secured a place in the play-offs on the final day of the season. A 2-1 aggregate victory over Peterborough United set up a final at Wembley against Bolton Wanderers. Buckingham's side claimed a 2-0 victory on 18 May 2024, returning to the EFL Championship for the first time in a quarter of a century.

After a positive start to life in the second tier, results stagnated, and on 15 December 2024, Buckingham was sacked. His side had never been in the relegation zone during his tenure, and supporters expressed their shock, sadness, and anger at his dismissal.

On 20 December 2024, the club announced it had appointed Gary Rowett as Buckingham's replacement.

== Managers ==
Manager dates and statistics are sourced from Howland, Complete Record up to and including Lawrenson, and from Soccerbase thereafter. Results in competitions not recorded by Soccerbase are sourced from The English Football Archive. Only professional, competitive matches are counted. Statistics are complete up to and including 2 May 2026.

Key

P: Matches played W: Matches won D: Matches drawn L: Matches lost

Table of managers, including nationality, tenure, record and honours
Name	Nationality	From	To	P	W	D	L	Win %	Honours	Ref
Harry Thompson	English	1 July 1949	6 November 1958	466	210	87	169	45.1	Southern League champions: 1952–53; Southern League runners-up: 1953–54; Southern League Cup winners: 1952–53, 1953–54	
Committee of board members		6 November 1958	1 January 1959	11	6	0	5	54.5		
Arthur Turner	English	1 January 1959	28 February 1969	504	218	119	167	43.3	Southern League runners-up: 1959–60; Southern League champions: 1960–61, 1961–62; Fourth Division promotion: 1964–65; Third Division champions: 1967–68	
Ron Saunders	English	1 March 1969	30 June 1969	12	6	3	3	50.0		
Gerry Summers	English	1 July 1969	1 October 1975	293	93	89	111	31.7		
Mick Brown	English	1 October 1975	22 July 1979	187	53	61	73	28.3		
Bill Asprey	English	22 July 1979	26 December 1980	82	23	20	39	28.0		
Ian Greaves	English	26 December 1980	30 January 1982	50	23	16	11	46.0		
Roy Barry (caretaker)	Scottish	3 February 1982	28 February 1982	6	2	3	1	33.3		
Jim Smith	English	1 March 1982	11 June 1985	167	89	42	36	53.3	Third Division champions: 1983–84; Second Division champions: 1984–85	
Maurice Evans	English	11 June 1985	26 March 1988	140	41	41	58	29.3	League Cup winners: 1986	
Mark Lawrenson	Irish	26 March 1988	25 October 1988	23	4	8	11	17.4		
Brian Horton	English	25 October 1988	27 August 1993	251	79	65	107	31.5		
Maurice Evans (caretaker)	English	27 August 1993	10 September 1993	3	0	0	3	0.0		
Denis Smith	English	10 September 1993	24 December 1997	247	99	60	88	40.1	Second Division runners-up: 1995–96	
Malcolm Crosby (caretaker)	English	24 December 1997	24 January 1998	5	0	1	4	0.0		
Malcolm Shotton	English	24 January 1998	25 October 1999	88	26	22	40	29.5		
Mickey Lewis (caretaker)	English	25 October 1999	2 February 2000	22	6	8	8	27.3		
Denis Smith	English	3 February 2000	2 October 2000	30	8	3	19	26.7		
Mike Ford (caretaker)	English	3 October 2000	31 October 2000	6	0	1	5	0.0		
David Kemp	English	31 October 2000	30 April 2001	31	7	3	21	22.6		
Mike Ford (caretaker)	English	1 May 2001	8 May 2001	1	0	0	1	0.0		
Mark Wright	English	8 May 2001	22 November 2001	22	4	7	11	18.2		
Ian Atkins	English	23 November 2001	21 March 2004	122	47	35	40	38.5		
Graham Rix	English	22 March 2004	14 November 2004	29	6	8	15	20.7		
Darren Patterson (caretaker)	Northern Irish	14 November 2004	9 December 2004	3	1	0	2	33.3		
Ramón Díaz	Argentine	9 December 2004	4 May 2005	25	10	7	8	40.0		
David Oldfield (caretaker)	English	7 May 2005	7 May 2006	1	0	0	1	0.0		
Brian Talbot	English	6 May 2005	14 March 2006	44	10	16	18	22.7		
Darren Patterson	Northern Irish	14 March 2006	22 March 2006	3	1	2	0	33.3		
Jim Smith	English	22 March 2006	9 November 2007	82	34	26	22	41.5		
Darren Patterson	Northern Irish	9 November 2007	30 November 2008	59	24	11	24	40.7		
Jim Smith (caretaker)	English	30 November 2008	21 December 2008	4	2	2	0	50.0		
Chris Wilder	English	21 December 2008	26 January 2014	269	121	70	78	45.0	Conference Premier play-off winners: 2009–10	
Mickey Lewis (caretaker)	English	26 January 2014	22 March 2014	12	3	5	4	25.0		
Gary Waddock	Irish	22 March 2014	4 July 2014	8	1	0	7	12.5		
Michael Appleton	English	4 July 2014	20 June 2017	173	78	46	49	45.1	League Two runners-up: 2015–16; Football League Trophy runners-up: 2015–16, 2016–17	
Pep Clotet	Spanish	1 July 2017	22 January 2018	36	12	10	14	33.3		
Derek Fazackerley (caretaker)	English	22 January 2018	22 March 2018	8	2	1	5	25.0		
Karl Robinson	English	22 March 2018	26 February 2023	274	110	70	94	40.1	2020 EFL League One play-off runners-up	
Craig Short (caretaker)	English	26 February 2023	1 March 2023	2	0	0	2	0.0		
Liam Manning	English	12 March 2023	7 November 2023	29	14	7	8	48.3		
Craig Short (caretaker)	English	7 November 2023	16 November 2023	2	2	0	0	100.0		
Des Buckingham	English	16 November 2023	15 December 2024	59	20	16	23	33.9	2024 EFL League One play-off winners	
Craig Short (caretaker)	English	20 December 2024	21 December 2024	1	0	0	1	0.0		
Gary Rowett	English	22 December 2024	23 December 2025	50	14	15	21	28.0		
Matt Bloomfield	English	9 January 2026	20 June 2026	22	6	7	9	27.3		
Aaron Ramsey	Welsh	23 June 2026	present	2	1	1	0	50.0		
