= 1982–83 Fulham F.C. season =

Fulham
1982–83 season
- Chairman: Ernie Clay
- Manager: Malcolm Macdonald
- Stadium: Craven Cottage
- Football League Second Division: 4th
- Milk Cup: Second round
- FA Cup: Fourth round
- Top goalscorer: League: Gordon Davies (19); All: Gordon Davies (20)
- Highest home attendance: 24,251 v Leicester City (Division Two, 23 April 1983)
- Lowest home attendance: 4,641 v Southend United (Milk Cup first round second leg, 14 September 1982)
- Average home league attendance: 10,836
- Biggest win: 4–0 v Bolton Wanderers (H), Division Two, 11 September 1982; 4–0 v Grimsby Town (A), Division Two, 13 November 1982; 4–0 v Grimsby Town (H), Division Two, 26 March 1983
- Biggest defeat: 0–3 v Charlton Athletic (A), Division Two, 28 September 1982; 0–3 v Oldham Athletic (H), Division Two, 6 November 1982
Home colours	Away colours

The 1982–83 season was Fulham's 88th as a professional club in the Football League. They competed in the Second Division and narrowly missed out on a second consecutive promotion following an infamous defeat at Derby County in their final match.

== Season summary ==
For much of the season, the prospect of back-to-back promotions for Fulham was a serious possibility. At the start of 1983, they were in third place behind Wolverhampton Wanderers and Queens Park Rangers, and were seven points clear of fourth-placed Leicester City with a game in hand by the end of March.

However, successive defeats to Leicester, Sheffield Wednesday and QPR saw Fulham drop out of the promotion places for the first time since November. Going into their final match of the season at relegation-threatened Derby, Fulham's destiny was now out of their hands as they were level on points with Leicester, but with an inferior goal difference.

While Leicester were being held to a goalless draw at home by Burnley, Fulham fell behind to a 71st-minute goal by Bobby Davison. The final minutes at the Baseball Ground were played out amid chaotic scenes with Derby supporters lining the pitch, many spilling on to the playing area, and a full scale pitch invasion greeted what appeared to be the final whistle. It later transpired referee Ray Chadwick had actually blown for an offside decision and there were still 78 seconds to go, but there was little hope of the match restarting.

Fulham manager Malcolm Macdonald immediately called for the match to be replayed and the club lodged an official appeal the following Monday, which was rejected by the Football League. A further appeal against this decision also failed, ending Fulham's hopes of returning to the First Division for the first time since 1968.

== Squad ==
Substitute appearances indicated in brackets

Pos.	Nat.	Name	League		Milk Cup		FA Cup		Total	
Pos.	Nat.	Name	Apps	Goals	Apps	Goals	Apps	Goals	Apps	Goals
GK	IRE	Gerry Peyton	42	0	4	0	3	0	49	0
GK	ENG	Jim Stannard	0	0	0	0	0	0	0	0
DF	ENG	Roger Brown	42	4	4	1	3	0	49	5
DF	ENG	Cliff Carr	4(2)	1	1	0	0	0	5(2)	1
DF	ENG	Clive Day	0	0	0	0	0	0	0	0
DF	ENG	Tony Gale	42	2	4	1	3	0	49	3
DF	WAL	Jeff Hopkins	41	1	4	0	3	0	48	1
DF	ENG	Kevin Lock	34	2	3	0	0	0	37	2
DF	ENG	Paul Parker	6(10)	0	2	0	3	0	11(10)	0
DF	ENG	Les Strong	3	0	0	0	0	0	3	0
DF	ENG	Steve Tapley	0	0	0	0	0	0	0	0
MF	IRE	Brian Cottington	0	0	0	0	0	0	0	0
MF	IRE	Ray Houghton	42	5	4	1	3	1	49	7
MF	ENG	Ray Lewington	42	10	4	0	3	1	49	11
MF	ENG	John Marshall	0	0	0	0	0	0	0	0
MF	ENG	Brian McDermott (on loan from Arsenal)	0(3)	0	0	0	0	0	0(3)	0
MF	IRE	Sean O'Driscoll	42	3	4	0	3	0	49	3
MF	WAL	Peter O'Sullivan	0(1)	0	0	0	0	0	0(1)	0
MF	ENG	John Reeves	0(2)	0	1	0	0	0	1(2)	0
MF	ENG	Peter Scott	0	0	0(1)	0	0	0	0(1)	0
MF	IRE	Robert Wilson	40	11	2	0	3	0	45	11
FW	ENG	Dean Coney	37	4	4	1	3	2	44	7
FW	WAL	Gordon Davies	38	19	3	1	3	0	44	20
FW	SLE	Leroy Rosenior	1	0	0	0	0	0	1	0
FW	HKG	Dale Tempest	3(1)	0	0	0	0	0	3(1)	0
FW	ENG	Andy Thomas (on loan from Oxford United)	3(1)	2	0	0	0	0	3(1)	2

== Second Division ==
Pos	Team	Pld	W	D	L	GF	GA	GD	Pts	Relegation
2	Wolverhampton Wanderers (P)	42	20	15	7	68	44	+24	75	Promotion to the First Division
3	Leicester City (P)	42	20	10	12	72	44	+28	70	Promotion to the First Division
4	Fulham	42	20	9	13	64	47	+17	69	
5	Newcastle United	42	18	13	11	75	53	+22	67	
6	Sheffield Wednesday	42	16	15	11	60	47	+13	63	

Rules for classification: 1) Points; 2) Goal difference; 3) Goals scored
(P) Promoted

== Results ==
=== Second Division ===
Date	Opponents	H / A	Result F – A	Scorers	Attendance
28 August 1982	Rotherham United	H	1–1	Davies	7,021
4 September 1982	Shrewsbury Town	A	1–0	Wilson	3,525
7 September 1982	Queens Park Rangers	H	1–1	Lewington	15,004
11 September 1982	Bolton Wanderers	H	4–0	Coney 2, Lewington (pen), Houghton	5,688
18 September 1982	Middlesbrough	A	4–1	Davies 2, Lewington (pen), Houghton	6,445
25 September 1982	Leeds United	H	3–2	Davies 2, Coney	12,798
28 September 1982	Charlton Athletic	A	0–3		6,790
2 October 1982	Barnsley	A	3–4	Hopkins, Wilson, Davies	12,582
9 October 1982	Blackburn Rovers	H	3–1	Davies, Lewington (pen), Wilson	5,698
16 October 1982	Newcastle United	A	4–1	Davies 2, Coney, Houghton	29,490
23 October 1982	Burnley	H	3–1	Lewington 2 (1 pen), Houghton	9,040
30 October 1982	Crystal Palace	A	1–1	O'Driscoll	14,912
6 November 1982	Oldham Athletic	H	0–3		6,897
13 November 1982	Grimsby Town	A	4–0	Davies 2, Wilson, Gale	6,952
20 November 1982	Wolverhampton Wanderers	A	4–2	Lewington, Davies 2, Wilson	14,448
27 November 1982	Sheffield Wednesday	H	1–0	Davies	13,864
4 December 1982	Leicester City	A	0–2		9,082
11 December 1982	Derby County	H	2–1	Thomas, Carr	7,854
18 December 1982	Carlisle United	A	2–3	Lewington (pen), O'Driscoll	4,859
27 December 1982	Cambridge United	H	1–1	Brown	9,105
28 December 1982	Chelsea	A	0–0		29,797
1 January 1983	Wolverhampton Wanderers	H	1–3	Lewington	17,196
3 January 1982	Shrewsbury Town	H	2–1	Davies, Thomas	7,786
15 January 1982	Rotherham United	A	1–0	Brown	7,667
22 January 1982	Middlesbrough	H	1–0	Wilson	8,431
5 February 1982	Bolton Wanderers	A	1–0	O'Driscoll	6,748
19 February 1983	Blackburn Rovers	A	0–0		6,141
26 February 1983	Newcastle United	H	2–2	Davies, Lock (pen)	14,277
5 March 1983	Burnley	A	0–1		8,828
12 March 1982	Crystal Palace	H	1–0	Brown	11,234
19 March 1983	Oldham Athletic	A	0–1		6,189
26 March 1982	Grimsby Town	H	4–0	Wilson 2, Davies, Lewington	8,096
2 April 1983	Chelsea	H	1–1	Lock	15,249
5 April 1983	Cambridge United	A	0–1		6,249
9 April 1982	Charlton Athletic	H	2–1	Davies, Brown	9,035
16 April 1983	Leeds United	A	1–1	Houghton	24,328
19 April 1982	Barnsley	H	1–0	Gale	9,003
23 April 1983	Leicester City	H	0–1		24,251
30 April 1983	Sheffield Wednesday	A	1–2	Wilson	12,531
2 May 1983	Queens Park Rangers	A	1–3	Davies	24,431
7 May 1982	Carlisle United	H	2–0	Wilson 2	10,045
14 May 1983	Derby County	A	0–1		21,124

=== Milk Cup ===
Date	Round	Opponents	H / A	Result F – A	Scorers	Attendance
1 September 1982	First Round First Leg	Southend United	A	0–1		2,671
14 September 1982	First Round Second Leg	Southend United	H	4–2	Pennyfather (og), Coney, Houghton, Davies	4,641
4 October 1982	Second Round First Leg	Coventry City	H	2–2	Gale, Brown	6,237
26 October 1982	Second Round Second Leg	Coventry City	A	0–0 (AET - lost on away goals)		8,217

=== FA Cup ===
Date	Round	Opponents	H / A	Result F – A	Scorers	Attendance
8 January 1983	Third Round	Oldham Athletic	A	2–0	Coney, Houghton	8,087
29 January 1983	Fourth Round	Watford	A	1–1	Coney	24,574
1 February 1983	Fourth round replay	Watford	H	1–2	Lewington	22,206
