= 1989–90 Derby County F.C. season =

Derby County F.C.
1989–90 season
- Manager: Arthur Cox
- Football League First Division: 16th
- FA Cup: Third round
- League Cup: Quarter-finals

This article documents the 1989–90 season of football club Derby County F.C.

== League table ==
| Pos | Team | Pld | W | D | L | GF | GA | GD | Pts | Qualification or relegation |
|---|---|---|---|---|---|---|---|---|---|---|
| 14 | Manchester City | 38 | 12 | 12 | 14 | 43 | 52 | −9 | 48 | |
| 15 | Crystal Palace | 38 | 13 | 9 | 16 | 42 | 66 | −24 | 48 | |
| 16 | Derby County | 38 | 13 | 7 | 18 | 43 | 40 | +3 | 46 | |
| 17 | Luton Town | 38 | 10 | 13 | 15 | 43 | 57 | −14 | 43 | |
| 18 | Sheffield Wednesday (R) | 38 | 11 | 10 | 17 | 35 | 51 | −16 | 43 | Relegation to the Second Division |

Source: World Football
Rules for classification: 1) Points; 2) Goal difference; 3) Goals scored
(R) Relegated

== Results ==
=== First Division ===
| 19 August 1989 1 | Charlton Athletic | 0–0 | Derby County | London |
| | | | | Stadium: Selhurst Park; Attendance: 8,543 |

| 23 August 1989 2 | Derby County | 1–1 | Wimbledon | Derby |
| | Cork 28' | | Hebberd 84' | Stadium: Baseball Ground; Attendance: 13,874 |

| 26 August 1989 3 | Derby County | 2–0 | Manchester United | Derby |
| | Goddard; Saunders | | | Stadium: Baseball Ground; Attendance: 22,175 |

| 30 August 1989 4 | Nottingham Forest | 2–1 | Derby County | Nottingham |
| | Crosby; Pearce | | Hodge (o.g.) | Stadium: City Ground; Attendance: 24,060 |

| 9 September 1989 5 | Derby County | 0–3 | Liverpool | Derby |
| | | | Rush; Barnes; Beardsley | Stadium: Baseball Ground; Attendance: 20,034 |

| 16 September 1989 6 | Queens Park Rangers | 0–1 | Derby County | London |
| | | | Saunders | Stadium: Loftus Road; Attendance: 10,697 |

| 23 September 1989 7 | Derby County | 0–1 | Southampton | Derby |
| | | | Wallace | Stadium: Baseball Ground; Attendance: 13,694 |

| 30 September 1989 8 | Aston Villa | 1–0 | Derby County | Birmingham |
| | Platt | | | Stadium: Villa Park; Attendance: 16,245 |

| 14 October 1989 9 | Derby County | 3–1 | Crystal Palace | Derby |
| | Goddard x2 Saunders (pen.) | | Pardew | Stadium: Baseball Ground; Attendance: 14,535 |

| 21 October 1989 10 | Derby County | 0–1 | Chelsea | Derby |
| | | | Dixon | Stadium: Baseball Ground; Attendance: 17,279 |

| 28 October 1989 11 | Arsenal | 1–1 | Derby County | London |
| | Smith | | Goddard | Stadium: Highbury; Attendance: 33,189 |

| 4 November 1989 12 | Luton Town | 1–0 | Derby County | Luton |
| | Dowie | | | Stadium: Kenilworth Road; Attendance: 8,919 |

| 11 November 1989 13 | Derby County | 6–0 | Manchester City | Derby |
| | Wright; Hebberd; Saunders (pen.) x2 Goddard; Micklewhite | | | Stadium: Baseball Ground; Attendance: 19,239 |

| 18 November 1989 14 | Derby County | 2–0 | Sheffield Wednesday | Derby |
| | Goddard; Saunders | | | Stadium: Baseball Ground; Attendance: 18,085 |

| 25 November 1989 15 | Tottenham Hotspur | 1–2 | Derby County | London |
| | Stewart | | Saunders; Goddard | Stadium: White Hart Lane; Attendance: 28,075 |

| 2 December 1989 16 | Derby County | 2–0 | Charlton Athletic | Derby |
| | Saunders; Micklewhite | | | Stadium: Baseball Ground; Attendance: 14,590 |

| 9 December 1989 17 | Wimbledon | 1–1 | Derby County | London |
| | Scales | | Goddard | Stadium: Plough Lane; Attendance: 5,024 |

| 16 December 1989 18 | Norwich City | 1–0 | Derby County | Norwich |
| | Scales | | Rosario | Stadium: Carrow Road; Attendance: 16,184 |

| 26 December 1989 19 | Derby County | 0–1 | Everton | Derby |
| | | | McCall | Stadium: Baseball Ground; Attendance: 21,314 |

| 30 December 1989 20 | Derby County | 4–1 | Coventry City | Derby |
| | Pickering; Hebberd x2 Ramage | | Speedie | Stadium: Baseball Ground; Attendance: 17,011 |

| 1 January 1990 21 | Millwall | 1–1 | Derby County | London |
| | Dawes | | Pickering | Stadium: The Den; Attendance: 12,790 |

| 12 January 1990 22 | Manchester United | 1–2 | Derby County | Manchester |
| | Pallister | | Wright; Pickering | Stadium: Old Trafford; Attendance: 38,985 |

| 20 January 1990 23 | Derby County | 0–2 | Nottingham Forest | Derby |
| | | | Hodge; Jemson | Stadium: Baseball Ground; Attendance: 24,176 |

| 10 February 1990 24 | Derby County | 2–0 | Queens Park Rangers | Derby |
| | Gee; Saunders | | | Stadium: Baseball Ground; Attendance: 14,445 |

| 24 February 1990 25 | Derby County | 2–1 | Tottenham Hotspur | Derby |
| | Saunders; Harford | | Moncur | Stadium: Baseball Ground; Attendance: 19,676 |

| 3 March 1990 26 | Sheffield Wednesday | 1–0 | Derby County | Sheffield |
| | Sheridan | | | Stadium: Hillsborough; Attendance: 21,811 |

| 10 March 1990 27 | Southampton | 2–1 | Derby County | Southampton |
| | Wallace; Le Tissier | | Saunders | Stadium: The Dell; Attendance: 16,430 |

| 17 March 1990 28 | Derby County | 0–1 | Aston Villa | Derby |
| | | | Ormondroyd | Stadium: Baseball Ground; Attendance: 21,062 |

| 20 March 1990 29 | Crystal Palace | 1–1 | Derby County | London |
| | Gray | | Wright | Stadium: Selhurst Park; Attendance: 10,051 |

| 24 March 1990 30 | Derby County | 1–3 | Arsenal | Derby |
| | Briscoe | | Hayes x2 Campbell | Stadium: Baseball Ground; Attendance: 17,514 |

| 31 March 1990 31 | Chelsea | 1–1 | Derby County | London |
| | Wilson | | Harford | Stadium: Stamford Bridge; Attendance: 14,265 |

| 7 April 1990 32 | Coventry City | 1–0 | Derby County | Coventry |
| | Wright | | | Stadium: Highfield Road; Attendance: 11,157 |

| 14 April 1990 33 | Derby County | 2–0 | Millwall | Derby |
| | Harford x2 | | | Stadium: Baseball Ground; Attendance: 13,718 |

| 16 April 1990 34 | Everton | 2–1 | Derby County | Liverpool |
| | Atteveld; Sheedy | | Wright | Stadium: Goodison Park; Attendance: 23,933 |

| 21 April 1990 35 | Derby County | 0–2 | Norwich City | Derby |
| | | | Rosario; Fox | Stadium: Baseball Ground; Attendance: 13,758 |

| 28 April 1990 36 | Manchester City | 0–1 | Derby County | Manchester |
| | | | Wright | Stadium: Maine Road; Attendance: 29,542 |

| 1 May 1990 37 | Liverpool | 1–0 | Derby County | Liverpool |
| | Gillespie | | | Stadium: Anfield; Attendance: 38,038 |

| 5 May 1990 38 | Derby County | 2–3 | Luton Town | Derby |
| | Wright; Williams | | Breacker; Black x2 | Stadium: Baseball Ground; Attendance: 17,044 |

=== FA Cup ===
| 7 January 1990 Third round | Port Vale | 1–1 | Derby County | Stoke-on-Trent |
| | | | Hebberd | Stadium: Vale Park; Attendance: 17,478 |

| 10 January 1990 Third round | Derby County | 2–3 | Port Vale | Derby |
| | Ramage; Francis | | | Stadium: Baseball Ground; Attendance: 21,389 |

=== League Cup ===
| 19 September 1989 Second round First Leg | Cambridge United | 2–1 | Derby County | Cambridge |
| | | | Goddard | Stadium: Abbey Stadium; Attendance: 5,333 |

| 4 October 1989 Second round Second Leg | Derby County | 5–0 (6–2 agg.) | Cambridge United | Derby |
| | McMinn; Saunders x3 Goddard | | | Stadium: Baseball Ground; Attendance: 12,525 |

| 25 October 1989 Third round | Derby County | 2–1 | Sheffield Wednesday | Derby |
| | Saunders x2 | | | Stadium: Baseball Ground; Attendance: 18,042 |

| 22 November 1989 Fourth Round | Derby County | 2–0 | West Bromwich Albion | Derby |
| | McMinn x2 | | | Stadium: Baseball Ground; Attendance: 21,313 |

| 17 January 1990 Quarter Final | West Ham United | 1–1 | Derby County | London |
| | Dicks | | Saunders | Stadium: Boleyn Ground; Attendance: 25,035 |

| 24 January 1990 Quarter Final Replay | Derby County | 0–0 | West Ham United | Derby |
| | | | | Stadium: Baseball Ground; Attendance: 22,510 |

| 31 January 1990 Quarter Final Second Replay | West Ham United | 2–1 | Derby County | London |
| | Slater; Keen | | Saunders | Stadium: Boleyn Ground; Attendance: 25,166 |

=== Full Members' Cup ===
| 29 November 1989 Northern Section Round 2 | West Bromwich Albion | 0–5 | Derby County | West Bromwich |
| | | | | Stadium: The Hawthorns; Attendance: 4,880 |

| 20 December 1989 Northern Section Round 3 | Newcastle United | 3–2 (a.e.t.) | Derby County | Newcastle-upon-Tyne |
| | | | | Stadium: St James' Park; Attendance: 6,800 |

== Squad ==
Note: Flags indicate national team as defined under FIFA eligibility rules; some limited exceptions apply. Players may hold more than one non-FIFA nationality.

| Pos. | Nation | Player |
|---|---|---|
| GK | ENG | Peter Shilton |
| GK | ENG | Martin Taylor |
| DF | ENG | Jon Davidson |
| DF | ENG | Rob Hindmarch |
| DF | ENG | Paul Blades |
| DF | ENG | Michael Forsyth |
| DF | ENG | Mark Wright |
| DF | ENG | Paul Williams |
| DF | ENG | Jason Kavanagh |
| DF | ENG | Mark Patterson |
| DF | ENG | Robbie Briscoe |
| DF | ENG | Mel Sage |
| DF | ENG | Brian McCord |
| MF | ENG | Nick Pickering |

| Pos. | Nation | Player |
|---|---|---|
| MF | ENG | Steve Hayward |
| MF | ENG | Trevor Hebberd |
| MF | ENG | Gary Micklewhite |
| MF | ENG | Craig Ramage |
| MF | WAL | Geraint Williams |
| MF | ENG | Martyn Chalk |
| MF | SCO | Ted McMinn |
| MF | ENG | Steve Cross |
| MF | ENG | Kevin Francis |
| FW | ENG | Phil Gee |
| FW | ENG | Paul Goddard |
| FW | ENG | Mick Harford |
| FW | WAL | Dean Saunders |
