= 1986 Football League Cup final =

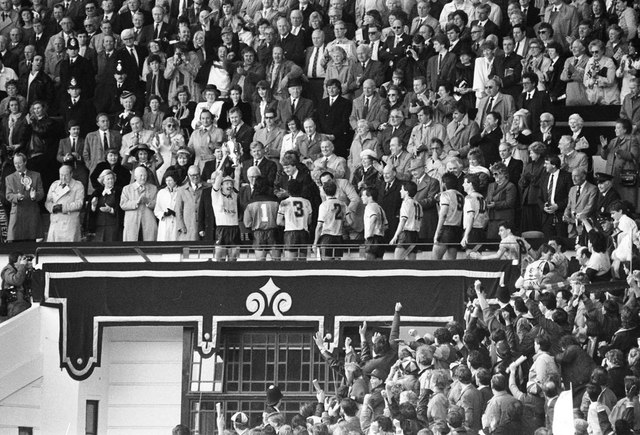
- Oxford United lifting the cup
- Event: 1985–86 Football League Cup
Oxford United	Queens Park Rangers
3	0
- Date: 20 April 1986
- Venue: Wembley Stadium, London
- Referee: Keith Hackett
- Attendance: 90,396

The 1986 Football League Cup final (known for sponsorship reasons as the Milk Cup) was a football match held on 20 April 1986 between Oxford United and Queens Park Rangers. Oxford won the match 3–0 to capture the League Cup – their first and only major honour. Trevor Hebberd opened the scoring in the first half, and Ray Houghton added a second. Jeremy Charles scored the third following up when John Aldridge had a shot saved by QPR goalkeeper Paul Barron. The match was played at Wembley Stadium in front of 90,396 spectators.

Because UEFA voted that the ban on English clubs in European competitions (beginning after the Heysel disaster in May 1985) would continue for a second season, Oxford United were denied a place in the 1986–87 UEFA Cup.

== Route to the final ==
Oxford United
Round	Opposition	Score
2nd	Northampton Town (h)	2–0
2nd	Northampton Town (a)	2–1
2nd	Aggregate score 4–1	
3rd	Newcastle United (h)	3–1
4th	Norwich City (h)	3–1
5th	Portsmouth (h)	3–1
Semi-final	Aston Villa (a)	2–2
Semi-final	Aston Villa (h)	2–1
Semi-final	Aggregate score 4–3	

Oxford United and Queens Park Rangers were both playing in the First Division and both entered the competition at the second round stage, under the tournament format in place at the time. Oxford had never previously progressed past the quarter finals, which they reached in the 1969–70 and 1983–84 seasons. Queens Park Rangers, on the other hand, were victorious in the 1967 final where they defeated West Bromwich Albion. In the second round, Oxford defeated Northampton Town of the Fourth Division 4–1 on aggregate after two legs. The 2–1 away victory at the County Ground was Oxford's only away win at Northampton in cup competitions.

Queens Park Rangers
Round	Opposition	Score
2nd	Hull City (h)	3–0
2nd	Hull City (a)	5–1
2nd	Aggregate score 8–1	
3rd	Watford (a)	1–0
4th	Nottingham Forest (h)	3–1
5th	Chelsea (h)	1–1
replay	Chelsea (a)	2–0
Semi-final	Liverpool (h)	1–0
Semi-final	Liverpool (a)	2–2
Semi-final	Aggregate score 3–2	

After a third-round home win against Newcastle United, Oxford United faced Second Division side and cup holders Norwich City in the fourth round, winning 3–1. In the fifth round Oxford defeated Portsmouth 3–1, making it the third consecutive round where a 3–1 home victory was recorded. Despite the fifth-round tie, the attendance for the game was around 400 lower than the league average, after a boycott was organised because of increased ticket prices.

The semi-final against First Division Aston Villa was contested over two legs. The first at Villa Park finished 2–2, with the return leg ending in a 2–1 victory for Oxford after goals from Jeremy Charles and Les Phillips.

QPR began the competition against Second Division Hull City, winning 8–1 on aggregate, including a 5–1 away victory at Boothferry Park. In the third round they beat Watford of the First Division 1–0 at Vicarage Road. The "Hoops" defeated another First Division team, Nottingham Forest, in the fourth round, but found the fifth round tougher against Chelsea. After the first match ended in a 1–1 draw at Loftus Road, the reply held at Stamford Bridge ended in a 2–0 win with goals from Alan McDonald and Michael Robinson. In the semi-finals, Queens Park Rangers took on Liverpool. QPR went through 3–2 on aggregate after a 1–0 home win was followed by a 2–2 draw at Anfield. Apart from the second round tie against Hull City, all the teams that Queens Park Rangers defeated on their way to Wembley played in the First Division, including champions Liverpool. In contrast, Oxford United only faced two, Newcastle United and Aston Villa.

== Match details ==
20 April 1986

Oxford United	3–0	Queens Park Rangers
Hebberd 40'; Houghton 52'; Charles 86'	Report

Wembley Stadium, London
Attendance: 90,396
Referee: Keith Hackett (Sheffield)

Oxford	QPR

GK	1	(England) Alan Judge
DF	2	(Republic of Ireland) Dave Langan
DF	3	(England) John Trewick
MF	4	(England) Les Phillips
DF	5	(England) Gary Briggs
DF	6	(England) Malcolm Shotton (c)
MF	7	(Republic of Ireland) Ray Houghton
FW	8	(Republic of Ireland) John Aldridge
FW	9	(Wales) Jeremy Charles
MF	10	(England) Trevor Hebberd (Man of the Match)
MF	11	(England) Kevin Brock
Substitute:
FW	12	(England) Andy Thomas
Manager:
(England) Maurice Evans

GK	1	(England) Paul Barron
DF	2	(Northern Ireland) Alan McDonald
DF	3	(England) Ian Dawes
DF	4	(England) Warren Neill
MF	5	(England) Steve Wicks
DF	6	(England) Terry Fenwick (c)
MF	7	(England) Martin Allen	Substituted off
MF	8	(Wales) Robbie James
FW	9	(England) Gary Bannister
FW	10	(Republic of Ireland) John Byrne
MF	11	(Republic of Ireland) Michael Robinson
Substitute:
FW	12	(England) Leroy Rosenior	Substituted on
Manager:
(England) Jim Smith

Match rules

- 90 minutes
- 30 minutes of extra-time if necessary
- Replay if scores still level
- One named substitute
- Maximum of one substitution
