= Wayne Mumford =

Welsh footballer

Personal information
- Full name: Wayne Ernest Mumford
- Date of birth: 3 November 1964 (age 61)
- Place of birth: Rhymney, Wales
- Position: Right back

Youth career
- 1980–1982: Manchester City

Senior career*
Years	Team	Apps	(Gls)
1982–1984	Birmingham City	7	(0)
1984–1985	Worcester City		(1)
1985–1986	Coventry Sporting		
1986	Leamington		
1986–1987	Bedworth United		
- * Club domestic league appearances and goals

Wayne Ernest Mumford (born 3 November 1964) is a Welsh former professional footballer who played in the English Football League for Birmingham City.

Mumford was born in Rhymney, Monmouthshire, and brought up in Coventry, Warwickshire. Capped by Wales at youth level, he began his club career as an apprentice with Manchester City, but returned to the Midlands where he signed professional forms with Birmingham City in September 1982. He made his debut as a 17-year-old in the First Division on 16 October 1982 in a 1–1 draw at Nottingham Forest. This was the first of six starts for the first team: in each case he deputised competently for established right backs Dave Langan and Jim Hagan. Mumford also captained Birmingham's youth team. He was released in 1984, and went on to play Southern League football for Worcester City, Coventry Sporting, Leamington and Bedworth United, before a knee injury put an end to his career.
