= Paul Barron =

English footballer (born 1953)

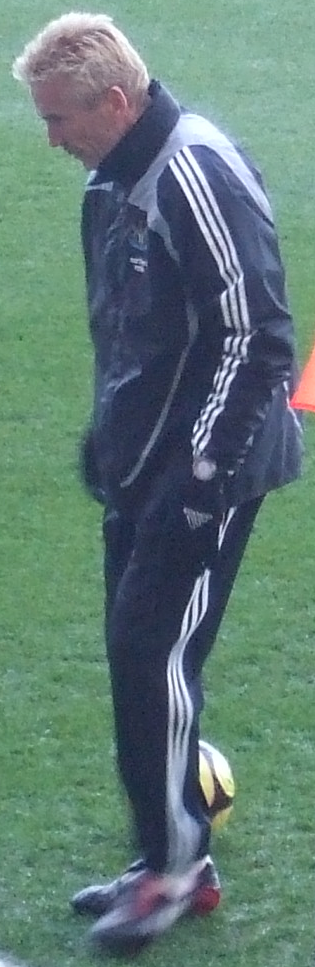
- Barron pictured in 2009

Personal information
- Full name: Paul George Barron
- Date of birth: 16 September 1953 (age 73)
- Place of birth: Woolwich, London, England
- Height: 6 ft 2 in (1.88 m)
- Position: Goalkeeper

Senior career*
Years	Team	Apps	(Gls)
1971–1973	Welling United		
1973–1975	Wycombe Wanderers	2	(0)
1975–1976	Slough Town	45	(0)
1976–1978	Plymouth Argyle	44	(0)
1978–1980	Arsenal	8	(0)
1980–1982	Crystal Palace	90	(0)
1982–1985	West Bromwich Albion	63	(0)
1985	→ Stoke City (loan)	1	(0)
1985–1988	Queens Park Rangers	32	(0)
1986	→ Reading (loan)	4	(0)
1988–1989	Welling United	100	(0)
1990	Cheltenham Town	5	(0)
1990–1991	Welling United	25	(0)
Total		419	(0)

Managerial career
- 2015–: Las Vegas Mobsters
- * Club domestic league appearances and goals

Paul George Barron (born 16 September 1953) is an English former professional footballer who played as a goalkeeper. He currently serves as a Mentor for the goalkeepers and goalkeeping coaches at Newcastle United's Academy

== Playing career ==
Born in Woolwich, London, Barron qualified as a PE instructor before becoming a professional footballer. He played for non-league Welling United, Wycombe Wanderers and Slough Town, before turning professional with Plymouth Argyle in July 1976.

He signed for Arsenal in July 1978 for £70,000, as cover for Pat Jennings. Barron made his Arsenal debut on 22nd August 1978 against Manchester City but was unable to oust Jennings from the first team; after only eight appearances in two seasons he moved on to Crystal Palace in 1980. He joined Palace along with Clive Allen, while Kenny Sansom moved to Arsenal as part of the deal.

At Selhurst Park Barron was favoured by manager Terry Venables over John Burridge as Palace suffered a poor start to the 1980–81 season. However, Venables left in October 1980 to become manager at Queens Park Rangers, and Burridge followed in December. Barron made 33 league appearances that season, (in which Palace were relegated) but remained at Palace in 1981–82 and for the first half of 1982–83 as the Eagles finished 15th in consecutive seasons. Barron joined West Bromwich Albion in December 1982 and spent three seasons at the Hawthorns making 63 First Division appearances. In 1984–85 he joined Stoke City on loan, and played once keeping a clean sheet, in a 0–0 draw away at Leicester City. He joined Queens Park Rangers in August 1985 and he appeared in the 1986 Football League Cup Final for QPR, in their defeat by Oxford United at Wembley Stadium. Barron spent two seasons at Loftus Road which included a short spell on loan at Reading and in the summer of 1988 he returned to his first club Welling United.

== Coaching career ==
After retiring as a player, Barron became a goalkeeping coach, working at Coventry City, Queens Park Rangers and West Bromwich Albion. He then moved to Aston Villa, before joining Middlesbrough in 2001. Barron was sent to the stands during Middlesbrough's away League Cup match against Tottenham Hotspur on 26 September 2007, after protesting about Gareth Bale's opening goal. In November 2007 he left Boro to become goalkeeping coach at Newcastle United. Barron left Newcastle United in December 2010 following the departure of manager Chris Hughton. As of 2023 Barron is a coach of Girls' Elite Academy teams at Las Vegas Sports Academy.

== Career statistics ==
Appearances and goals by club, season and competition
Club	Season	League			FA Cup		League Cup		Other (Note: Includes Anglo-Scottish Cup and Football League Group Cup)		Total	
Club	Season	Division	Apps	Goals	Apps	Goals	Apps	Goals	Apps	Goals	Apps	Goals
Plymouth Argyle	1976–77	Second Division	3	0	0	0	1	0	0	0	4	0
Plymouth Argyle	1977–78	Third Division	41	0	4	0	3	0	3	0	51	0
Plymouth Argyle	Total		44	0	4	0	4	0	3	0	55	0
Arsenal	1978–79	First Division	3	0	0	0	0	0	0	0	3	0
Arsenal	1979–80	First Division	5	0	0	0	0	0	0	0	5	0
Arsenal	Total		8	0	0	0	0	0	0	0	8	0
Crystal Palace	1980–81	First Division	33	0	0	0	4	0	0	0	37	0
Crystal Palace	1981–82	Second Division	40	0	5	0	4	0	0	0	49	0
Crystal Palace	1982–83	Second Division	17	0	0	0	5	0	2	0	24	0
Crystal Palace	Total		90	0	5	0	13	0	2	0	110	0
West Bromwich Albion	1982–83	First Division	20	0	2	0	0	0	0	0	22	0
West Bromwich Albion	1983–84	First Division	42	0	4	0	4	0	0	0	50	0
West Bromwich Albion	1984–85	First Division	1	0	0	0	0	0	0	0	1	0
West Bromwich Albion	Total		63	0	6	0	4	0	0	0	73	0
Stoke City (loan)	1984–85	First Division	1	0	0	0	0	0	0	0	1	0
Queens Park Rangers	1985–86	First Division	31	0	1	0	9	0	0	0	41	0
Queens Park Rangers	1986–87	First Division	1	0	0	0	0	0	0	0	1	0
Queens Park Rangers	Total		32	0	1	0	9	0	0	0	42	0
Reading (loan)	1986–87	Second Division	4	0	0	0	0	0	0	0	4	0
Career total			242	0	16	0	30	0	5	0	293	0

== Honours ==
Queens Park Rangers

- Football League Cup runner-up: 1985–86
