= Geoff Scott (footballer) =

English footballer (1956–2018)

Personal information
- Full name: Geoffrey Samuel Scott
- Date of birth: 31 October 1956
- Place of birth: Birmingham, England
- Date of death: 17 October 2018 (aged 61)
- Position: Defender

Youth career
- 1973–1975: Aston Villa

Senior career*
Years	Team	Apps	(Gls)
–	Solihull Borough		
–	Highgate United		
1977–1980	Stoke City	78	(3)
1980–1982	Leicester City	39	(0)
1982	Birmingham City	19	(0)
1982–1984	Charlton Athletic	2	(0)
1984	Middlesbrough	2	(0)
1984–1985	Northampton Town	17	(0)
1985–1986	Cambridge United	19	(0)
1986–1987	Solihull Borough		
1987–1988	Moor Green		
1988–1989	Highgate United		
Total		176	(3)

Managerial career
- 1988–1989: Highgate United (player-manager)
- * Club domestic league appearances and goals

Geoffrey Samuel Scott (31 October 1956 – 17 October 2018) was an English professional footballer who made 176 appearances in the Football League playing for Stoke City, Leicester City, Birmingham City, Charlton Athletic, Middlesbrough, Northampton Town and Cambridge United. He played as a defender.

== Football career ==
Scott was born in Birmingham, and played began his career with Aston Villa. He failed to earn a professional contract with Villa and played non-league football for Kings Heath, Solihull Borough and Highgate United before joining Stoke City in 1977. He made his Football League debut on 22 October 1977 as a substitute in a 2–1 defeat away at Blackburn Rovers. He played regularly for Stoke, making 78 league appearances in two and a half years, and was part of the side that gained promotion to the First Division in the 1978–79 season. He played 16 First Division games before signing for Leicester City as the replacement for Dennis Rofe who had recently joined Chelsea.

Scott spent two years at Leicester, and was part of the side that won the Second Division title in the 1979–80 season. He played 39 league games, before signing for Birmingham City. Scott remained at Birmingham only a few months, then played for Charlton Athletic, Middlesbrough, Northampton Town and Cambridge United, where his League career ended because of injury. He returned to the Birmingham area and played for Solihull Borough, Moor Green and Highgate United, becoming player-manager of the latter club in the 1988–89 season.

== After football ==
After retiring from the game, Scott took a degree in business studies and worked in the telecommunications industry. He returned to football when appointed secretary of the Stoke City Old Boys Association, and became chief executive of Xpro, an organisation supporting the health and welfare of former professional footballers.

Scott suffered from cancer in his later years and died on 17 October 2018 at the age of 61.

== Career statistics ==
Appearances and goals by club, season and competition
Club	Season	League			FA Cup		League Cup		Other^{[A]}		Total	
Club	Season	Division	Apps	Goals	Apps	Goals	Apps	Goals	Apps	Goals	Apps	Goals
Stoke City	1977–78	Second Division	24	2	2	0	0	0	0	0	26	2
Stoke City	1978–79	Second Division	38	0	1	0	4	0	0	0	43	0
Stoke City	1979–80	First Division	16	1	0	0	3	0	0	0	19	1
Stoke City	Total		78	3	3	0	7	0	0	0	88	3
Leicester City	1979–80	Second Division	11	0	0	0	0	0	0	0	11	0
Leicester City	1980–81	First Division	21	0	2	0	0	0	0	0	23	0
Leicester City	1981–82	Second Division	7	0	0	0	3	0	0	0	10	0
Leicester City	Total		39	0	2	0	3	0	0	0	43	0
Birmingham City	1981–82	First Division	15	0	0	0	0	0	0	0	15	0
Birmingham City	1982–83	First Division	4	0	0	0	0	0	0	0	4	0
Birmingham City	Total		19	0	0	0	0	0	0	0	19	0
Charlton Athletic	1982–83	Second Division	2	0	0	0	0	0	0	0	2	0
Charlton Athletic	1983–84	Second Division	0	0	0	0	0	0	0	0	0	0
Middlesbrough	1984–85	Second Division	2	0	0	0	1	0	0	0	3	0
Northampton Town	1984–85	Fourth Division	17	0	3	0	0	0	2	0	22	0
Cambridge United	1985–86	Fourth Division	19	0	1	0	0	0	2	0	22	0
Career total			176	3	9	0	11	0	4	0	200	3

A. The "Other" column constitutes appearances and goals in the Football League Trophy.

== Honours ==
Stoke City

- Football League Second Division third-place promotion: 1978–79

Leicester City

- Football League Second Division champions: 1979–80
