= Ray Houghton =

Irish footballer

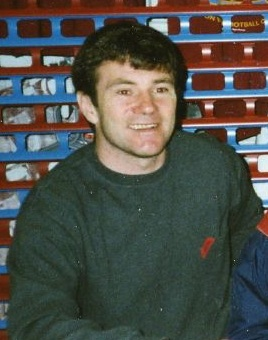
- Houghton in the mid-1990s

Personal information
- Full name: Raymond James Houghton
- Date of birth: 9 January 1962 (age 64)
- Place of birth: Glasgow, Scotland
- Height: 5 ft 7 in (1.70 m)
- Position: Midfielder

Youth career
- –1979: West Ham United

Senior career*
Years	Team	Apps	(Gls)
1979–1982	West Ham United	1	(0)
1982–1985	Fulham	129	(16)
1985–1987	Oxford United	83	(10)
1987–1992	Liverpool	153	(28)
1992–1995	Aston Villa	95	(6)
1995–1997	Crystal Palace	73	(7)
1997–1999	Reading	43	(1)
1999–2000	Stevenage Borough	3	(0)
Total		580	(68)

International career
1986–1997	Republic of Ireland	73	(6)
- * Club domestic league appearances and goals

Raymond James Houghton (born 9 January 1962) is a former professional footballer and current sports analyst and commentator with RTÉ Sport.

As a player, he was a midfielder, notably playing for Liverpool where he won two First Division titles and two FA Cups before switching to Aston Villa ahead of the inaugural Premier League season. He also briefly played top flight football for West Ham United, Oxford United, and Crystal Palace with spells in the Football League for Fulham, and Reading, before retiring with non-league Stevenage Borough.

Born in Glasgow, Scotland, Houghton played international football for the Republic of Ireland, for which he qualified through his Irish father. Houghton is particularly remembered by Irish fans for scoring two of the most important goals in the national team's history, which resulted in 1–0 victories over England in Stuttgart at the 1988 European Championship, and Italy at Giants Stadium at the 1994 World Cup.

== Club career ==
=== Early career ===
Houghton was born in Castlemilk, Glasgow (where Arthur Graham, who would also become an international footballer, was an upstairs neighbour in the same tenement block). However, he moved to London at the age of 10 and began his professional career at West Ham United, where he came through the ranks and signed professional forms as a 17-year-old on 5 July 1979. He failed to make an impact at Upton Park and on 7 July 1982, after 3 years and just one substitute appearance, moved on to Fulham on a free transfer.

=== Fulham ===
Malcolm Macdonald had Tony Gale (later a Premier League title-winner with Blackburn Rovers), Paul Parker (who went on to win several major trophies with Manchester United), Gerry Peyton (Republic of Ireland international goalkeeper) and Ray Lewington (ex-Chelsea) to form a mixture of youth and experience which ultimately won Fulham promotion to the Second Division at the end of the 1981–82 season. He then added Houghton to the side that would try to keep the Cottagers in the second division. They did, and comfortably so; in fact for much of the 1982–83 season it looked as though Fulham would achieve back-to-back promotions; however, their form after the turn of the year dipped.

=== Oxford United ===
Jim Smith had taken Oxford United to the top tier of English football. When he left in 1985, his replacement, Maurice Evans, looked to Houghton to help solidify their place in the league. He paid £147,000 for Houghton on 13 September 1985. Houghton had played 145 times for Fulham and scored 21 goals. He made his U's debut the day after he signed, in a 2–2 draw with Liverpool at the Manor Ground. By the end of his first season, Houghton had helped to steer Oxford clear of the relegation places (they stayed up with a win on the final day of the season), but most notably scored the second goal in the club's 3–0 League Cup final victory over Smith's new team Queens Park Rangers at Wembley.

=== Liverpool ===
At the start of the 1987–88 season, Oxford were beaten 2–0 by Liverpool, who then offered £825,000 for his services. The deal was done and Houghton took the place of Craig Johnston on the right side of Liverpool's midfield, unusually wearing the No. 9 shirt that striker John Aldridge (his former Oxford teammate who had made the Anfield move himself a year earlier) had asked not to wear because of the pressure of replacing Ian Rush.

Houghton was added to the new acquisitions of Aldridge, Peter Beardsley and John Barnes to form one of the most exciting forward lines in the club's history. He made his Reds debut on 24 October 1987 in a 1–0 league victory over Luton Town at Kenilworth Road. His first goal for the club came on 4 November 1987 in a 1–1 draw with Wimbledon at Plough Lane. Houghton's 62nd-minute strike came just two minutes after he had come on as a sub for Johnston. It also kept up Liverpool's run of 29 unbeaten league matches from the start of the season. Liverpool went on to coast to the League title, Houghton contributing some memorable displays as a marauding creator from the flank. He scored his share of goals too, including the first goal in the era-defining 5–0 win over Nottingham Forest, which was later described by some journalists as the "match of the century" and was complimented by the game's greats such as Tom Finney.

Houghton did his bit in the run to that season's FA Cup final too, scoring the winner in a fifth round derby at Everton and then clipping home a shot on the turn as Liverpool romped past Manchester City 4–0 in the quarter-finals. In the final, Liverpool surprisingly lost to Wimbledon and missed out on the "double".

The following season, Houghton was again a regular as Liverpool battled towards another League and FA Cup "double", though they again would be denied. More important matters than football affected Houghton and his teammates in April 1989 however, as the Hillsborough disaster on 15 April claimed 94 lives (with the death toll eventually reaching 97). Upon returning to the game Liverpool went on to win the Cup with a 3–2 extra-time victory over Everton but lost the League title with virtually the last kick of the season in the title decider at Anfield against Arsenal.

The following year Houghton and Liverpool regained the title when they finished 9 points ahead of Aston Villa, although Houghton managed just 19 out of 38 league appearances in the 1989–90 season and scored just once.

Houghton played 32 times in the 1990–91 season, scoring seven goals, as Liverpool finished second in the League to Arsenal. He picked up another FA Cup winners' medal with Liverpool in the 1991–92 season and also had his best return in goals during his time at Anfield, finishing as the club second highest goalscorer with 12 goals, only bettered by Dean Saunders. However, Souness allowed Houghton to leave at the end of the season, partly due to the emergence of Steve McManaman.

After 202 appearances and 38 goals in his 5 successful years at Liverpool Houghton joined Aston Villa for £900,000.

=== Aston Villa ===
Ray Houghton joined Aston Villa at the start of the 1992–93 season. Villa manager Ron Atkinson had to fend off attempts by Chelsea manager Ian Porterfield to bring Houghton in. Houghton made his debut on 15 August 1992 in the 1–1 draw with Ipswich Town at Portman Road, Villa's first game in the new FA Premier League.

Houghton again won the fans over with his robust style and helped Villa win the League Cup on 27 March 1994, although he was an unused sub for a Villa side who defeated Manchester United 3–1. This would be the only trophy that he won during his time at Villa. He did come close to collecting another title medal in his first season at Villa Park, as Villa had led the league at several stages of the campaign, but were eventually pushed into runners-up place by Manchester United, who were crowned champions.

Houghton played a total of 117 times for Villa, scoring 11 goals.

=== Crystal Palace ===
On 23 March 1995 (transfer deadline day) Houghton left Villa to join Crystal Palace. Palace paid £300,000 for the player hoping that his experience would help Palace stave off relegation from the Premier League and progress in the FA Cup, but they were relegated (despite finishing fourth from bottom as the division was being reduced to 20 clubs) and eliminated at the semi-final stage in the respective competitions.

Houghton made his Palace debut, as a 33-year-old, on 1 April 1995 in the 2–1 win over Manchester City at Selhurst Park. One of Houghton's best performances for the South London club was on 28 September 1996 in the 6–1 thrashing of Southend United in a Division One fixture at Selhurst Park. Houghton was at the heart of everything Palace did, and scored a goal in the 38th minute. He spent just over two years at Palace, playing 87 times and scoring 8 goals.

=== Reading ===
Houghton signed for Reading on a free transfer on 15 July 1997. He made his debut the following month on 9 August in the 1–1 league draw with Bury at Gigg Lane.

He spent a season at Elm Park and another at Reading's new home, the Madejski Stadium, which saw him rack up 56 appearances in which he scored just once, against Manchester City. Reading would be Houghton's last professional club, he had played 723 times during his career scoring 93 goals.

=== Stevenage Borough ===
Houghton wound his career down at Stevenage Borough in the Conference. He signed for Stevenage on 24 September 1999 but only made three appearances before he retired from the game on 31 May 2000.

== International career ==
Houghton was born in Scotland to an Irish father and Scottish mother. Prior to his career with the Republic of Ireland, Houghton was a member of a Scotland U18 squad under Andy Roxburgh, failing to gain any caps. Despite becoming increasingly successful in his club career by 1986, he was not considered for the Scotland squad for the upcoming World Cup.

Houghton qualified to play international football for the Republic of Ireland through his father, who was born in Buncrana in Inishowen, County Donegal, in Ulster. He earned his first cap in Jack Charlton's first match as manager, a 1–0 defeat by Wales in a friendly international at Lansdowne Road on 26 March 1986.

In the summer of 1988, Houghton was selected for the Irish squad which had reached its first ever major finals, the European Championships in West Germany. The first group game on 12 June was against an England team that included Gary Lineker, Bryan Robson and Houghton's Liverpool club mates Peter Beardsley and John Barnes. Houghton scored with an early looping header to win the game 1–0, his first goal for Ireland. Ireland failed to get through the group stage after a draw against the USSR and a defeat against eventual champions The Netherlands.

Houghton was selected for the Irish squad which qualified for the 1990 FIFA World Cup in Italy. They were once again drawn in the same group as England, which included Lineker, Robson, Beardsley and Barnes as well as Paul Gascoigne and Chris Waddle. The game finished in a 1–1 draw. The Irish also drew with both Egypt, 0–0, and the Netherlands, 1–1, finishing on the same points (3), goal difference (0), and goals scored (2) as the Dutch. Both teams progressed to the second round, along with England who topped the group.

On 25 June Ireland faced Romania at the Stadio Luigi Ferraris in Genoa. Following a hard earned 0–0 draw, the game went to penalties with Houghton scoring the second penalty kick to help Ireland win 5–4 and qualify for the quarter-finals. Ireland were defeated 1–0 by the host nation Italy in a closely fought match.

Houghton was selected in the Irish squad for the 1994 FIFA World Cup in the United States and was once again the goalscoring hero in a shock victory. In the 11th minute of the group E match at Giants Stadium on 18 June Houghton hit a looping shot into the net to defeat Italy, gaining revenge for the defeat Ireland had suffered at the hands of the Italians four years earlier. Ireland were knocked out of the tournament at the next stage by the Netherlands.

Houghton's final appearance was as a substitute in the 1998 FIFA World Cup play-off match with Belgium in Brussels in November 1997. Ireland lost the match 2–1 (3–2 on aggregate) with Houghton scoring his final international goal. He had represented Ireland 73 times scoring 6 goals.

Houghton has now taken up post as an ambassador for the Football Association of Ireland (FAI).

In 2008, Houghton was part of the three-man team along with Don Givens and Don Howe appointed to head-hunt the new international manager. After interviewing several candidates, Houghton and the team ultimately nominated Giovanni Trapattoni to the FAI.

== Media career ==
Houghton now works as a pundit on the game, working for outlets such as RTÉ in Ireland, and Talksport, Sky Sports, Sportsxchange in the UK and LFC TV. Since 2002 he has also worked for Sports Interactive as a consultant on their game Football Manager.

In 2005, he was given an honorary degree by the University of Huddersfield, for his services to sport. He joined actor Tim Brooke Taylor and former Olympic swimmer Adrian Moorhouse in collecting degrees.

He contributed to RTÉ Sport's coverage of the 2010 FIFA World Cup, and was a co-commentator during their coverage of the 2014 FIFA World Cup, UEFA Euro 2016, UEFA Euro 2020, and the 2026 FIFA World Cup.

== Honours ==
Oxford United

- Football League Cup: 1985–86

Liverpool

- Football League First Division: 1987–88, 1989–90
- FA Cup: 1988–89, 1991–92; runner-up: 1987–88
- FA Charity Shield: 1990

Aston Villa

- Football League Cup: 1993–94

Individual

- PFA Team of the Year: 1982–83 Second Division, 1991–92 First Division
- FAI Senior International Player of the Year: 1994

== See also ==
- List of Republic of Ireland international footballers born outside the Republic of Ireland
