= Tony Evans (footballer, born 1954) =

English footballer

Personal information
- Full name: Anthony Evans
- Date of birth: 11 January 1954 (age 72)
- Place of birth: Liverpool, England
- Height: 5 ft 8 in (1.73 m)
- Position: Forward

Senior career*
Years	Team	Apps	(Gls)
1973	Formby	15	(7)
1973–1975	Blackpool	6	(0)
1975–1979	Cardiff City	124	(47)
1979–1983	Birmingham City	66	(28)
1983–1984	Crystal Palace	21	(7)
1984–1985	Wolverhampton Wanderers	23	(5)
1985	→ Bolton Wanderers (loan)	4	(0)
1985	→ Exeter City (loan)	0	(0)
1985–1986	Swindon Town	10	(0)
1986–1987	Stafford Rangers		
Total		269	(94)
- * Club domestic league appearances and goals

Anthony Evans (born 11 January 1954) is an English former professional footballer.

Evans was born in Liverpool. He played as a forward for clubs including Cardiff City, for whom he made well over 100 appearances, and Birmingham City, for whom he was leading scorer in the 1981–82 season.

Evans scored a hat-trick for Birmingham City against Manchester City in September 1981. This was the last top-flight hat-trick for Birmingham City until Mikael Forssell scored three against Tottenham Hotspur in 2008.

He then spent 21 games of the 1983-84 season with Crystal Palace, scoring seven goals - all of them away from home - to ensure their safety in the Second Division.

He joined Swindon Town on a free transfer from Wolverhampton Wanderers in August 1985, staying for the whole season but only racking up 14 appearances - mostly in August and September, and none after January - before he went to Stafford Rangers in May 1986. He stayed there for one season.

On retiring from football, he became a social worker, setting up the "Midnight League" to give young people an opportunity to play organised football at night as a diversion from possibly less constructive activities.
