= Mark Wright (footballer, born 1963) =

English footballer and manager

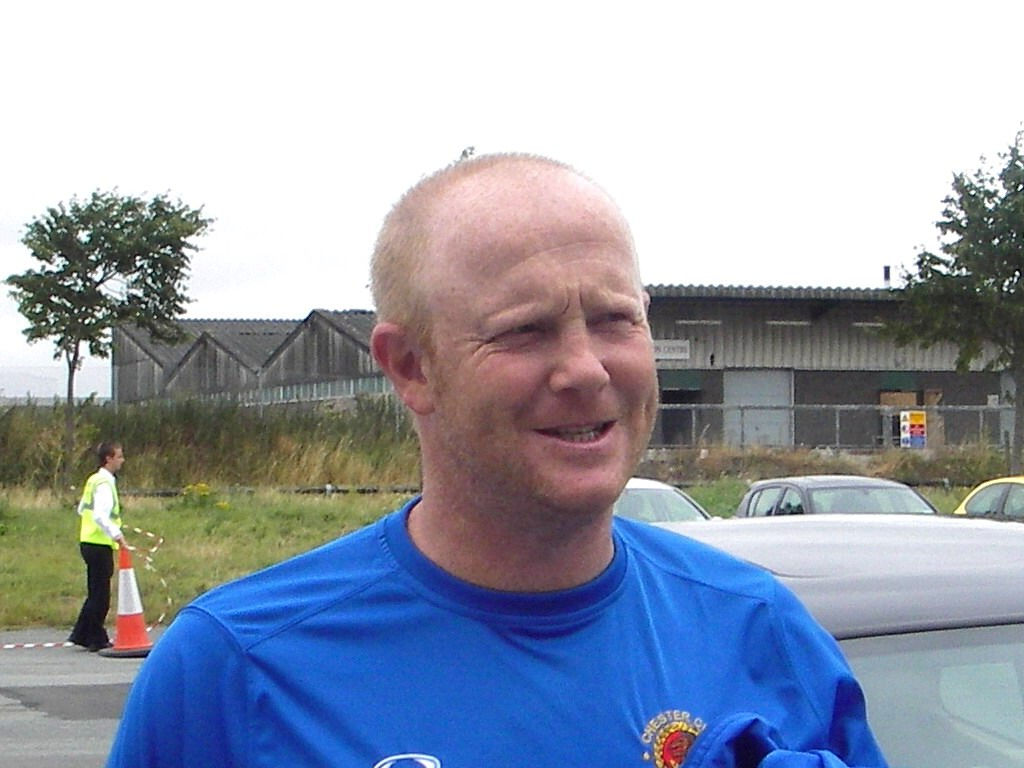
- Wright as manager of Chester City in 2006

Personal information
- Full name: Mark Wright
- Date of birth: 1 August 1963 (age 63)
- Place of birth: Dorchester on Thames, Oxfordshire, England
- Height: 6 ft 2 in (1.88 m)
- Position: Defender

Team information
- Current team: Southport (Head of development)

Senior career*
Years	Team	Apps	(Gls)
1980–1982	Oxford United	10	(0)
1982–1987	Southampton	170	(7)
1987–1991	Derby County	144	(10)
1991–1998	Liverpool	160	(5)
Total		484	(22)

International career
1983	England U21	4	(0)
1984–1996	England	45	(1)

Managerial career
- 2000–2001: Southport
- 2001: Oxford United
- 2002–2004: Chester City
- 2005–2006: Peterborough United
- 2006–2007: Chester City
- 2008–2009: Chester City
- 2012: Floriana
- * Club domestic league appearances and goals

Mark Wright (born 1 August 1963) is an English football manager and former player.

As a player, he had spells with Liverpool, Derby County, Southampton and Oxford United during the 1980s and 1990s. He made 45 appearances for the England national team, and was a member of the team which reached the semi-finals of the FIFA World Cup in 1990. At club level, the central defender won the 1992 FA Cup final as captain of Liverpool.

Since retiring as a player in 1998, Wright has worked as a football manager, pundit, and businessman. He has had three stints as manager of Chester City, during the first of which he led the club back into the Football League as Football Conference champions after a four-year exile. He has also had spells managing Peterborough United, Oxford United and Southport.

He is a regular pundit on LFC TV, Liverpool's official TV channel, and uses his experience as a foster carer and ambassador to advocate for more people to help children in need.

Along with Michael Owen, another ex-Liverpool and England player, Wright is a founder of Red Sports, a Liverpool-based company that specialises in soccer school and coaching education programmes in China.

Wright also founded Premier Legends, a company that gives fans around the world the chance to join ex-England and Premier League players for stadium tours, exhibition games, golf outings, dinners and audience Q+A sessions.

== Early life ==
Wright was born in Dorchester on Thames, Oxfordshire. He said he got into professional football late because he had stayed in school an extra year in order to get qualifications to become a PE teacher.

== Playing career ==
=== Oxford United ===
Wright began his career with Oxford United, eventually signing his first professional contract in August 1980. He was handed his first team debut at the age of 16 by manager Ian Greaves when the club were playing in the Third Division. The tall central defender made only ten appearances for the club, all of which came in his second season as a professional, when he helped Oxford finish fifth in the league.

Wright did not finish the 1981–82 campaign with Oxford, however, as on 25 March 1982 (deadline day) he was transferred to Southampton, who were then playing in the top flight of English football. Wright moved to Southampton for a transfer fee of £80,000 along with Oxford United forward Keith Cassells in a deal that saw Trevor Hebberd move the other way.

=== Southampton ===
Wright was only 18 when he arrived at the Dell and the Saints were flying high at the top of the table under manager Lawrie McMenemy. He made his debut for the club in a 3–1 win over Leeds United at Elland Road on 17 April 1982, a game which saw two Saints legends, Kevin Keegan and David Armstrong, score the goals. He featured in two of the Saints' remaining five league matches that season as Southampton eventually finished seventh in the league and qualified for the UEFA Cup.

In the 1982–83 season, Wright's first full campaign with the club, the Saints finished 12th in the old First Division. Wright scored his first league goal for the club in a 2–2 draw with Luton Town at The Dell on 30 April 1983. After finishing with two goals in 39 appearances, he was voted Player of the Year by the club's supporters.

Wright's star continued to rise during the 1983–84 season as he helped Saints to second place in the league – their highest ever finish. They finished only three points behind Liverpool, who also won the European Cup that season. A Southampton team that included England goalkeeper Peter Shilton also reached the FA Cup semi-finals that season, losing in extra-time to eventual winners Everton. Wright's performances at the heart of Saints' defence that year resulted in him making his debut for England in May 1984.

The following season Southampton performed strongly again, finishing fifth in the league, and after Chris Nicholl replaced McMenemy as manager in July 1985, Wright helped the club reach the 1986 FA Cup semi-final. Southampton took on Liverpool at White Hart Lane in what would prove a particularly disappointing day for Wright. Ten minutes before half-time Shilton rushed from his line to help the defender cut off a Liverpool attack but the goalkeeper then collided with his own player. Wright was stretchered off due to injury and Southampton again lost after extra-time against the eventual champions. Soon afterwards it was confirmed that Wright had broken his leg, ruining his chances of making England's 1986 World Cup squad. Wright bounced back from that setback to feature 30 times in the 1986–87 season and Southampton finished 12th in the table.

In July 1987, Wright's international colleague Shilton joined Derby County, who were returning to the top flight after a seven-year absence. Soon afterwards Derby also made a bid to bring Wright to the Baseball Ground. Saints accepted the offer and Wright completed his move in August for a then-club record fee of £760,000.

=== Derby County ===
Arthur Cox was the Derby County manager when Wright arrived at the East Midlands club, who had been promoted as champions of the Second Division at the end of the 1986–1987 season. Publishing magnate Robert Maxwell, the former chairman of Oxford United, had helped save Derby from going out of business in 1984. Installed as the club's chairman in 1987, Maxwell spent heavily to bolster the Rams' squad for their return to the First Division.

Wright joined Derby four games into the new season and made his debut on 29 August 1987, a 1–0 home defeat in the league against Wimbledon. Wright was soon made club captain but, despite the new signings, the Rams found life at the top table of English football tough. A strong defensive record, however, helped them finish 15th, one point above the relegation zone.

Maxwell continued to invest significantly and Welsh international striker Dean Saunders joined from Oxford for £1 million in October 1988. With Saunders hitting the ground running, Derby enjoyed a strong season, which included wins at Manchester United and eventual league winners Arsenal. The Rams ended the campaign fifth in the table and would have qualified for the UEFA Cup were it not for the ongoing ban on English clubs taking part in European competitions in the wake of the Heysel Stadium disaster in May 1985. Wright's contribution as part of one of the best defences in the league led to Derby fans selecting him as the 1988–89 player of the season.

Derby's debts were spiraling under Maxwell's watch, however, and the following season they only managed to finish 16th. Despite their lowly position, the Rams once again had one of the best defensive records in the First Division. Six goals from Wright also helped the club avoid relegation and he was once again voted Derby's player of the season. In so doing, he became the first player to win the Jack Stamps Trophy in two consecutive seasons. Wright then had a memorable experience at the 1990 World Cup and in 2009 he revealed that he had received offers to join Roma and Fiorentina as a result.

Instead he returned to Derby to find that the club's off-field problems were mounting. Maxwell introduced a freeze on transfers for the 1990–1991 campaign and a week into the season he put the club up for sale. Inevitably the Rams' form suffered and they endured a record 20 game winless run on their way to being relegated.

Wright left Derby for Liverpool that summer but he is still fondly remembered by Rams supporters. In 2009, as part of the club's 125th anniversary celebrations, he was voted as the fourth best centre back in Derby's history. He had played 144 times for Derby scoring 10 goals.

=== Liverpool ===
With Derby in desperate need of raising cash and Wright aware that playing outside the top flight would diminish his chances of continuing his England career, a transfer in the summer of 1991 was always likely. Liverpool had tried to sign Wright a few months previously and their need for a quality central defender had grown following the injury problems and subsequent retirement of captain Alan Hansen. New Reds boss Graeme Souness returned with a fresh bid for Wright and the 27-year-old completed his move on 15 July 1991. The transfer fee was £2.2 million – a record sum for a defender in English football.

Wright made his debut on 17 August 1991 in a 2–1 league win over Oldham Athletic at Anfield but he suffered an injury that kept him out for three months soon afterwards. Having narrowly missed out on the league title the year before Wright's arrival, a much-changed Liverpool squad finished a disappointing sixth in the table in his first season. They were knocked out of the UEFA Cup by Genoa at the quarter-final stage but the season ended on a positive note with victory in the FA Cup. Wright captained the side as they beat Second Division Sunderland 2–0 in the decider.

Wright was captain again for the 1992–93 campaign and he headed home his first goal for the Reds in a 1–1 draw with his former club Southampton in September 1992. Spartak Moscow beat the Reds in the European Cup Winners Cup second round despite Wright getting on the scoresheet in the first leg. The title holders were knocked out in the third round of the FA Cup by Bolton Wanderers and another sixth-placed finish in the league meant there would be no European football for Liverpool the following season.

Wright lost the captaincy for the 1993–94 campaign but a poor season for the club followed as Liverpool finished eighth in the league after Roy Evans replaced Souness as manager midway through the year. The arrival of Phil Babb and John Scales, as well as a series of injuries, restricted Wright to just six appearances in the 1994–95 campaign, which saw Liverpool finish fourth and beat Bolton to win the League Cup.

Having missed almost a year of football, and aged 32 when the 1995–1996 campaign kicked off, Wright proved many doubters wrong by regaining a starting place at club level. Liverpool finished 3rd in the league and were runners-up to Manchester United in the FA Cup final. Wright's return to form earned him a recall to the England national team. Another injury meant Wright missed out on Euro 96 but the following season he helped Liverpool to a fourth-placed finish in the league. Wright also scored the second goal in Liverpool's 2–0 win over Paris Saint-Germain in the semi-final of the UEFA Cup Winners' Cup. But the Reds had lost the first leg 3–0 so his header was not enough for them to qualify for the final.

After two excellent seasons, however, Wright was forced to retire from playing in September 1998, at the age of 35, due to a back problem. In seven years at the club, he scored nine goals in 210 appearances. A 2006 LFC TV programme entitled 100 Players Who Shook the Kop, based on a survey of the club's fans, ranked Wright at number 65 in order of the impact he made on Liverpool's history. An updated version of the programme, broadcast in August 2013, had Wright at number 87.

=== England ===
==== Emergence under Robson ====
Wright made four appearances for England's under-21 side in 1983 before Bobby Robson handed him his first chance at senior international level. Wright was still playing at Southampton when he made his debut against Wales in a Home International Championship fixture on 2 May 1984. The 20 year old started at centre half alongside Alvin Martin but Wales striker Mark Hughes, another debutant, got the only goal at the Racecourse Ground in Wrexham. Wright made 12 more appearances for England ahead of the 1986 World Cup but his leg break in that year's FA Cup semi-final put paid to his hopes of going to Mexico for the tournament.

==== Euro 1988 ====
Wright returned for England's bid to qualify for the 1988 European Championship and played in their first two games against the Republic of Ireland and the Netherlands at the final tournament in West Germany. The finals did not go well, however, as Robson's side lost both those games as well as their final group match against the USSR. Following Euro 88, the emergence of Des Walker meant that Wright went almost two years before earning another cap for England.

==== 1990 World Cup ====
Wright did not feature during the 1990 World Cup qualifying campaign but he was still included in the squad for the finals in Italy, ahead of Tony Adams, as back-up to Walker and Terry Butcher. Following a 1–1 draw against the Republic of Ireland in England's opening group game, Robson decided to change his system and Wright was included as a sweeper in a three-man defence for the 0–0 draw with the Netherlands. Wright then headed home on 58 minutes in a 1–0 win over Egypt in Cagliari in England's final group match. It was Wright's only goal for his country but it proved a vital one as it ensured England would qualify for the last 16 as Group F winners. Wright helped England keep another clean sheet against Belgium in the knockout stages and a late David Platt goal in extra-time set up a meeting with Cameroon in the last eight. Wright was forced off with a head injury as England trailed 2–1 but after being patched up he ended the game in a defensive midfield role and Gary Lineker's two penalties helped England qualify after extra-time. Wright also played the full 120 minutes in the semi-final against West Germany but England lost on penalties after 1–1 draw. Wright then got through 72 minutes as England lost the third-place play-off 2–1 against the host country Italy in Bari.

==== Euro 92 and international exile ====
Wright continued to be a regular starter for England during the qualifying campaign for the next European Championship and even captained the side in a friendly win over the USSR at Wembley in May 1991. Injury problems restricted his progress in the 1991–92 season but he still looked set to take part in the tournament in Sweden. For the second time in his career, however, he was cruelly denied the chance to play at a finals. After aggravating an Achilles injury in a friendly against Finland, Wright was forced to withdraw from England's squad days before Euro 92 got underway. England finished bottom of their group but despite returning to fitness Wright only played once more under Taylor, a friendly against Spain in September 1992. He was dropped in October of that year but without him England failed to qualify for the 1994 World Cup. Wright's injury problems were becoming more frequent, however, and he was overlooked by new England manager boss Terry Venables while trying to rebuild his career at club level with Liverpool.

==== Euro 96 ====
In the 1995–96 season Liverpool's improved form coincided with Wright's return to the first team and he earned a surprise recall to the England set-up in April 1996. England were due to host Euro 96 that summer and Wright made his first appearance for his country in almost four years in a friendly against Croatia. Wright again featured in a three-man defence a month later as England won 3–0 against Hungary at Wembley but yet again injury struck at the wrong time. Wright strained knee ligaments only 12 minutes into the game, which meant that he would ultimately miss out on another major tournament. That match against Hungary in May 1996 proved to be Wright's last for England. In total he had won 45 caps over a 12-year period. The England manager for the first half of that time was Robson, a man Wright later described as "the most important person in my football career."

== Style of play ==
Wright was seen as a tough central defender who was good on the ball and an excellent reader of the game. Former Derby and England centre back Roy McFarland, who was Derby's assistant manager when Wright was at the club, said that he "had it all – power, pace, control". Ex-Derby midfielder Craig Ramage praised his former teammate as "a real leader" who was "dominant in the air, composed with the ball at his feet and great in the tackle." Ex-Liverpool defender Jamie Carragher said Wright was "very cool under pressure" and was like "hard rock" in defence. His "smooth" playing style has also been compared to Alan Hansen, the former Liverpool captain he was brought in to help replace at Anfield.

== Managerial career ==
=== Southport ===
Wright took on his first managerial role at Southport in December 1999. At the time the club were in the relegation positions in the Football Conference but Wright successfully steered his side to ninth in the table by the season's end. In his first full campaign, Wright did even better as the club finished fourth in the standings.

=== Oxford United ===
Wright left Southport in the summer of 2001 to take over at Oxford United, where he had started his playing career. The club had just been relegated to the Third Division but Wright resigned at the end of November 2001 hours before he was fined by the Football Association and given a four match touchline ban for verbally abusing a referee. Wright said he was not told that the charges included a "racial element" and denied making such comments. The FA said the first of two offensive remarks reported had not been heard by the match referee and its disciplinary commission said they were "not satisfied that the first remark had taken place."

=== Chester City ===
Wright soon found another job in the Conference and was named manager of Chester City in January 2002. The club were second bottom of the table when Wright took over but he guided them to safety. In the 2002–03 season, Chester came close to promotion but they lost their Conference play-off semi-final to Doncaster Rovers in a penalty shootout. After that defeat Wright vowed his side would "come back stronger" and the following season they won the Conference title, sealing promotion with a 1–0 win over Scarborough in April 2004. Wright said he would "cherish" the moment Chester confirmed their return to the Football League but he would not be in charge for their first game in League Two the following season.

Wright left the club on 6 August 2004, a day before the new league campaign got underway, describing it as the "saddest day of my life". He denied that there had been a dispute with players or staff but said he felt his position was untenable as he "could not take the club forward."

=== Peterborough United ===
Wright returned to management when he was hired by League Two side Peterborough in May 2005. Wright's reign got off to a promising start and his team were seventh in the table in January 2006. But that month he was suspended by the club pending an internal investigation for allegedly making a racist joke towards one of his players. A week later he was sacked after failing to attend a disciplinary hearing.

It later emerged that Wright had not attended the inquiry on the advice of his solicitor and that he intended to sue the club for breach of contract and damage to his reputation. Wright said he was "deeply hurt" and he categorically rejected allegations about his conduct.

=== Return to Chester City ===
In February 2006, less than a month after leaving Peterborough, Wright was offered the chance to return to Chester as manager until the end of the season. He helped the club avoid relegation from League Two and was rewarded with a new two-year contract in May. The following season did not go as well, however, and Wright left his role in April 2007.

=== Third spell at Chester ===
With Chester still struggling, Wright was brought back for a third spell as manager in November 2008. The club was put up for sale ten days after Wright's return though, and they were also operating under a transfer embargo. This time Wright, who was working on a non-contract basis, was unable to stave off relegation to the Conference. Chester then entered administration and in June 2009 Wright resigned as manager.

=== Return to Southport ===
In May 2017, he returned to Southport as Head of Club Development, although he and the entire management team left only four months later after the team lost five straight matches and conceded 19 goals.

== Managerial statistics ==
As of 18 October 2012

Managerial record by team and tenure
Team	From	To	Record				
Team	From	To	G	W	D	L	Win %
Peterborough United	31 May 2005	31 January 2006	29	10	10	9	34.48
Chester City	20 February 2006	30 April 2007	62	18	18	26	29.03
Chester City	14 November 2008	22 June 2009	31	5	9	17	16.13
Floriana	18 August 2012	18 October 2012	7	2	3	2	28.57
Total			129	35	40	54	27.13

== Personal life ==
=== Foster care advocate ===
Wright and his then wife Sue became foster carers for a three-year-old girl in 2008 and he has since used his experience and profile to advocate for more people to help children in need. He is an ambassador for Foster Care Associates and both at home and abroad he has tried to raise awareness of the importance of foster care and adoption. In November 2013, he joined Foster Care Associates in a national campaign to find an additional 10,000 foster carers – the Mark Wright UK10K campaign.

In June 2015, as part of Foster Care Fortnight, Wright helped organise a football legends match on top of a hotel roof to raise awareness of the 10,000 children in the UK who are still waiting for foster parents. Ex-Liverpool and Everton players John Barnes, Neville Southall and Peter Reid also took part in the event. Wright said that ex-Everton and Wales goalkeeper Neville Southall became a foster carer after speaking with him about the situation.

=== Football education in China ===
In 2016, Wright and his former Liverpool teammate and England striker Michael Owen set up Red Sports, a company that is developing coaching programmes in China. Red Sports hopes to educate a minimum of 1,200 local coaches per year and says its overall aim is to engage children in China by "radically changing the way football is taught at school level."

The Liverpool-based organisation says it is focusing on "mass participation rather than elite development" in the belief that China "has the potential to be a 21st Century superpower of football." Wright said "a stable of high-profile former footballers" would assist with the specially designed training programmes for soccer schools. Owen said they would help children in China learn about the benefits of a healthy lifestyle. Wright had earlier struck a deal with Chinese businessman Dr Tony Tung in March 2016 with a view to launching a pilot soccer schools programme in China.

=== Legends Tours ===
Following his retirement, Wright also founded Premier Legends, a company that gives fans the chance to join ex-England and Premier League players for stadium tours, exhibition and charity games, golf outings, dinners and audience Q+A sessions. Currently it operates in the UK, Gibraltar, Spain and China. Wright said he also hoped to use the project "to raise awareness for adoption and fostering" both in the UK and around the world.

He also regularly contributes to LFC TV as a pundit and appears on the after-dinner sports speaker circuit.

In 2019 and 2020, Wright featured in both seasons of ITV show Harry's Heroes, which featured former football manager Harry Redknapp attempting get a squad of former England international footballers back fit and healthy for a game against Germany legends.

== Honours ==
=== Player ===
Liverpool

- FA Cup: 1991–92; runner-up: 1995–96

Individual

- Southampton Player of the Year: 1982–83
- Derby County Player of the Year: 1988–89, 1989–90
- PFA Team of the Year: 1990–91 First Division, 1996–97 Premier League

=== Manager ===
Individual

- Football Conference Manager of the Month: November 2002
