= Carl Francis =

English footballer

Personal information
- Full name: Carlos Everton Francis
- Date of birth: 21 August 1962 (age 64)
- Place of birth: London, England
- Position: Winger

Youth career
- 1979–1980: Birmingham City

Senior career*
Years	Team	Apps	(Gls)
1980–1984	Birmingham City	5	(0)
1983–1984	→ Hereford United (loan)	5	(0)
1984–1985	Enfield	3	(0)
- * Club domestic league appearances and goals

Carlos Everton Francis (born 21 August 1962) is an English former professional footballer who played in the Football League for Birmingham City and Hereford United, and in the Alliance Premier League for Enfield.

Francis was born in West Ham, London. He joined Birmingham City as an apprentice in June 1979, and turned professional the following year. A pacy winger, Francis made his debut in the First Division on the opening day of the 1982–83 season, in the starting eleven for a 3–0 defeat at Manchester United. He was the first black player to appear for the club. He made one more start and three substitute appearances that season, but his inconsistency restricted his first-team football. In December 1983 he joined Fourth Division club Hereford United on a month's loan, where he played five league games. Francis was released in 1984, and he went on to play three games without scoring in the Alliance Premier League for Enfield in the 1984–85 season.
