= Gary Briggs (footballer) =

English footballer

Personal information
- Date of birth: 21 June 1959 (age 67)
- Place of birth: Leeds, England
- Height: 6 ft 3 in (1.91 m)
- Position: Centre back

Senior career*
Years	Team	Apps	(Gls)
1977–1978	Middlesbrough	0	(0)
1978–1989	Oxford United	420	(18)
1989–1995	Blackpool	137	(4)
1995–19??	Chorley	?	(?)
Total		557	(22)
- * Club domestic league appearances and goals

Gary Briggs (born 21 June 1959) is an English retired professional footballer. He made over 500 league appearances in an eighteen-year playing career, during which he became known as a no-nonsense, tough-tackling defender, hence his "Rambo" nickname.

== Career ==
In the 1977–78 season, at the age of eighteen, Briggs signed for Middlesbrough but didn't make any first-team appearances for the club. Later that season, he moved to Oxford United. The fee was settled at the Football League's first-ever transfer tribunal. Briggs spent eleven years at the Manor Ground, where he received the nickname "Rambo" and became a cult hero, winning the club's "Player of the Year" accolade three times. He formed a successful central-defensive partnership with club captain Malcolm Shotton as United won three trophies between 1984 and 1986: the Division Three championship in 1983–84, the Division Two championship the following season, and the League Cup in 1986.

In May 1989, after 418 league games and 18 league goals for Oxford, Briggs moved back north to Blackpool, where he saw out the rest of his career. "Blackpool looked a club going places – and I want to go with them," he said at the time. In the 1991–92 season he made 26 appearances in a start-stop season, and was voted the club's Player of the Month for September, October and November 1991. The 1993–94 campaign ended in nail-biting fashion: a final-day 4–1 victory over Leyton Orient at Bloomfield Road meant the Seasiders avoided relegation by one point.

In 2002, Briggs played for Bispham Juniors, whom he later managed.

In March 2005, Briggs unveiled Executive Box 28 at Oxford United's Kassam Stadium in his name.

== Honours ==
Oxford United

- Football League Third Division: 1983–84
- Football League Cup: 1985–86

== Sources ==
- Calley, Roy (1992). Blackpool: A Complete Record 1887–1992. Breedon Books Sport. ISBN 1-873626-07-X.
- Gary Briggs at Soccerbase
- Oxford Dream Team
- Playfair football annuals 1978–79 to 1995-96
