= Duncan MacDowall =

English footballer

Personal information
- Full name: Duncan John MacDowall
- Date of birth: 18 December 1963 (age 62)
- Place of birth: London, England
- Position: Centre forward

Youth career
- 1980–1981: Birmingham City

Senior career*
Years	Team	Apps	(Gls)
1981–1982	Birmingham City	2	(0)
1982–1983	Leatherhead		
- * Club domestic league appearances and goals

Duncan John MacDowall (born 18 December 1963) is an English former professional footballer who played in the Football League for Birmingham City. He played as a centre forward.

MacDowall was born in Paddington, London. He joined Birmingham City as an apprentice in 1980, and after some promising performances in the reserves, made his First Division debut on 23 March 1982 in a goalless draw at Tottenham Hotspur. He played once more that season, but then left the club. He played for Leatherhead on a non-contract basis during the 1982–83 season.
