= Jeremy Charles =

Welsh footballer

Personal information
- Full name: Jeremy Melvyn Charles
- Date of birth: 26 September 1959 (age 67)
- Place of birth: Swansea, Wales
- Height: 6 ft 1 in (1.85 m)
- Position: Centre-forward

Senior career*
Years	Team	Apps	(Gls)
1976–1983	Swansea City	247	(53)
1983–1985	Queens Park Rangers	12	(5)
1985–1987	Oxford United	46	(13)
Total		305	(71)

International career
1980–1986	Wales	19	(1)
- * Club domestic league appearances and goals

Jeremy Melvyn Charles (born 26 September 1959) is a Welsh former professional footballer and Wales international. Normally a centre-forward, he was equally adept as a centre-half. He played for Oxford United, Swansea City and Queens Park Rangers. He is the son of ex-footballer Mel Charles and nephew of Wales striker John Charles.

== Club career ==
Charles began his career at his home town club Swansea City, making his debut as a substitute for Robbie James during 4–1 win over Newport County on the opening day of the 1976–77 season. He went on to become a key member of the squad as they moved from Division Four to Division One in five seasons. Having won promotion, Charles scored Swansea's first ever goal in Division One during a 5–1 win over Leeds United, but his season was disrupted by injury as he underwent two cartilage operations.

With Swansea suffering relegation during the 1982–83 season, Charles joined Queens Park Rangers in November 1983 for a fee of £100,000 where he remained for just over a year before moving on to Oxford United in February 1985, where he was part of the side that won the Football League Cup in 1986, scoring one of his side's goals during a 3–0 win over his former club Queens Park Rangers. However, Charles was forced into retirement soon after due to injury.

== International career ==
Charles made his debut for Wales on 19 November 1980 in a 1–0 win over Czechoslovakia. He went on to win a total of 19 caps, scoring his only goal in a 1–0 win over Bulgaria before making his final appearance on 10 September 1986 in a 1–1 draw with Finland.

=== International goals ===
Results list Wales' goal tally first.

Goal	Date	Venue	Opponent	Result	Competition
1.	27 April 1983	Racecourse Ground, Wrexham, Wales	Bulgaria	1–0	UEFA Euro 1984 qualifying

== Honours ==
Swansea City

- Welsh Cup: 1981, 1983

Oxford United

- Football League Second Division: 1984–85
- Football League Cup: 1985–86
