= Bud Brocken =

Dutch footballer (1957–2025)

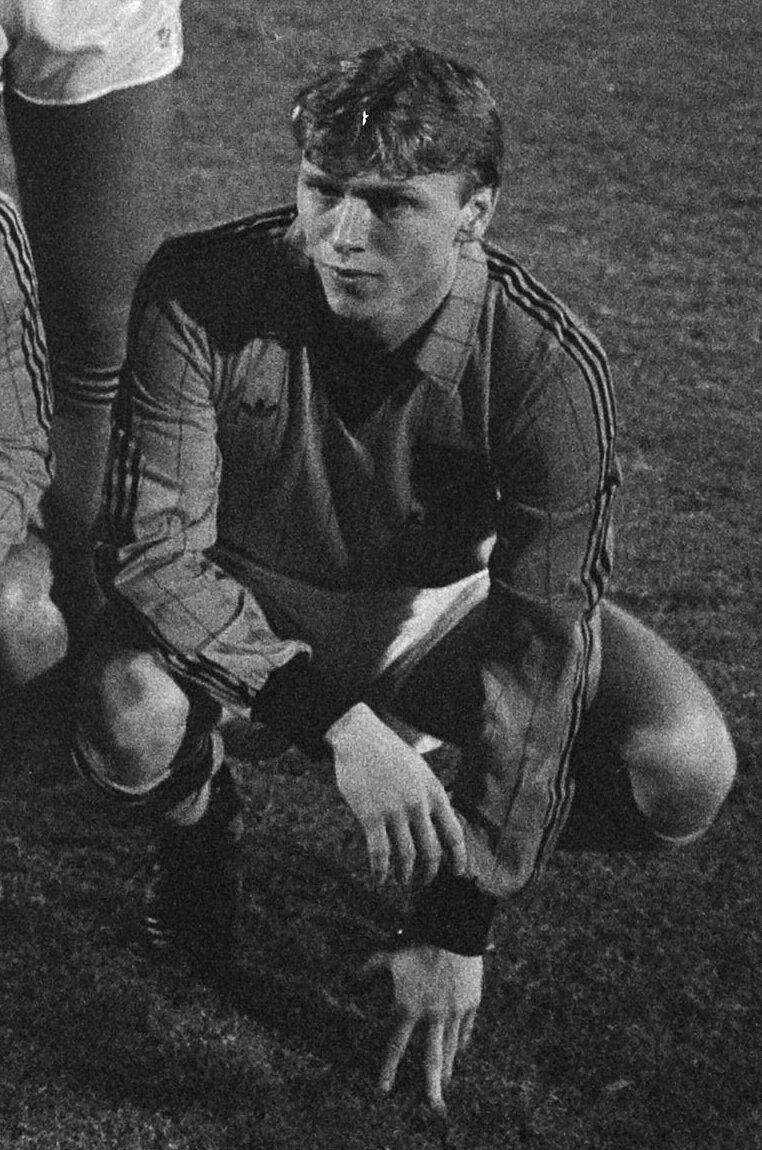
- Brocken in 1983

Personal information
- Full name: Budde Jan Peter Maria Brocken
- Date of birth: 12 September 1957
- Place of birth: Tilburg, Netherlands
- Date of death: 30 August 2025 (aged 67)
- Position: Winger

Youth career
- LONGA
- RKTVV

Senior career*
Years	Team	Apps	(Gls)
1975–1981	Willem II	186	(28)
1981–1982	Birmingham City	17	(0)
1982–1985	FC Groningen	90	(4)
1985–1990	Willem II	156	(20)
1990–1992	BVV Den Bosch	63	(3)
Total		512	(55)

International career
1983	Netherlands	5	(0)
- * Club domestic league appearances and goals

Budde Jan Peter Maria "Bud" Brocken (12 September 1957 – 30 August 2025) was a Dutch professional footballer who played for Willem II, Birmingham City, FC Groningen and FC Den Bosch, as well as the Netherlands national team, as a winger.

== Club career ==
Brocken played for hometown amateur side LONGA and RKTVV, before joining professional side Willem II aged 17. He made his debut for the Tricolores in 1975 against FC Dordrecht and amassed a total of 388 games for the club in two different spells. He also played for Birmingham City, FC Groningen and BVV Den Bosch.

== International career ==
Brocken made his debut for the Netherlands in a September 1983 Euro qualification match against Iceland and earned a total of 5 caps, scoring no goals. His final international was a December 1983 Euro 1984 qualification match against Malta.

== Personal life and death ==
Brocken worked as a real estate agent in his hometown Tilburg. He died on 30 August 2025, at the age of 67.
