= Alan Judge (English footballer) =

English footballer

Personal information
- Full name: Alan Graham Judge
- Date of birth: 14 May 1960 (age 66)
- Place of birth: Kingsbury, England
- Height: 5 ft 11 in (1.80 m)
- Position: Goalkeeper

Senior career*
Years	Team	Apps	(Gls)
1978–1982	Luton Town	11	(0)
1982	→ Reading (loan)	3	(0)
1982–1984	Reading	74	(0)
1984–1991	Oxford United	80	(0)
1985	→ Lincoln City (loan)	2	(0)
1987	→ Cardiff City (loan)	8	(0)
1991–1994	Hereford United	105	(0)
1994	Chelsea	0	(0)
1995	Bromsgrove Rovers	22	(0)
1995–1997	Kettering Town	53	(0)
2002–2003	Swindon Town	0	(0)
2003–2004	Oxford United	2	(0)
2003–2004	Didcot Town	3	(0)
2004	Slough Town	2	(0)
2004–2005	Chipping Norton Town	5	(0)
2005–2006	Brackley Town		(0)
2006–2007	Banbury United	17	(0)
- * Club domestic league appearances and goals

Alan Graham Judge (born 14 May 1960) is an English retired professional footballer, who is the seventh oldest player to play in the Football League. He played as a goalkeeper.

== Career ==
During his career he played for various clubs at all tiers of the League. He was part of the Oxford United team that won the Milk Cup in 1986. He also briefly served as a backup goalkeeper for Chelsea in the European Cup Winners' Cup.

Often referred to as The Judge, after retiring from the professional game he worked as a driving instructor and goalkeeping coach at several clubs including Swindon and Oxford, occasionally acting as emergency goalkeeping cover.

On 18 March 2003, at the age of 42, he played his first Football League match since leaving Hereford United in 1994; due to an injury crisis, he started for Oxford United in a 1–1 draw with Cambridge United, making a vital save in stoppage time.

During the 2003–04 season he also played for Didcot Town. He made a second appearance for Oxford on 6 November 2004, at the age of 44 years and 176 days. This made him the seventh oldest footballer ever to have appeared in the Football League or Premier League. During this season he also played for Chipping Norton Town.

Judge signed with Slough Town in 2004, playing three games after making his debut on 20 March 2004 in a 2–1 defeat to Banstead Athletic.

== Charity work ==
In 2001, he organised a re-run of the 1986 Milk Cup Final against QPR, for charity.

== Honours ==
Oxford United

- Football League Cup: 1985–86
