= Brian Cottington =

English footballer

Personal information
- Full name: Brian Anthony Cottington
- Date of birth: 14 February 1965 (age 61)
- Place of birth: Hammersmith, England
- Height: 4 ft 11 in (1.50 m)
- Position: Defender

Youth career
- –1983: Fulham

Senior career*
Years	Team	Apps	(Gls)
1983–1988	Fulham	74	(1)
1987	→ Aldershot (loan)	0	(0)
1988–1990	Enfield	48	(1)

International career
1983	Republic of Ireland U18	1	(0)
- * Club domestic league appearances and goals

Brian Anthony Cottington (born 14 February 1965) is an English footballer who played as a midfielder. He played in the Football League for Fulham and Aldershot.
