= Jon Davidson =

English footballer

Personal information
- Full name: Jonathan Stewart Davidson
- Date of birth: 1 March 1970 (age 56)
- Place of birth: Cheadle, England
- Position: Full-back

Youth career
- –1980: Derby County

Senior career*
Years	Team	Apps	(Gls)
1988–1992	Derby County	12	(0)
1992–1993	Preston North End	21	(1)
1993	→ Chesterfield (loan)	1	(0)
1993–1995	Telford United	32	(0)
1995–1996	Dagenham & Redbridge	6	(0)
1996	Ilkeston Town		
- Nuneaton Borough
- Shepshed Dynamo
- * Club domestic league appearances and goals

Jonathan Stewart Davidson (born 1 March 1970) is an English former professional footballer who played as a full-back in the Football League for Derby County, Preston North End and Chesterfield. He also played for a number of teams in non-League football, most notably Dagenham & Redbridge.
