= Les Phillips =

English footballer

Personal information
- Full name: Leslie Michael Phillips
- Date of birth: 7 January 1963 (age 63)
- Place of birth: Lambeth, London, England
- Height: 5 ft 8 in (1.73 m)
- Position: Midfielder

Youth career
- 1979–1980: Birmingham City

Senior career*
Years	Team	Apps	(Gls)
1980–1984	Birmingham City	44	(3)
1984–1993	Oxford United	179	(10)
1993–1994	Northampton Town	26	(0)
1994–????	Marlow		
????–2001	Banbury United		
- * Club domestic league appearances and goals

Leslie Michael Phillips (born 7 January 1963) is an English former football midfielder who scored 13 goals from 249 appearances in the Football League.

Phillips began his career at Birmingham City as an apprentice in 1979. He was capped by England at youth level, and made his first-team debut for Birmingham in a 2–2 draw at West Ham United in February 1982. In all he played 44 league games for Birmingham, scoring 3 goals, before he was transferred to Oxford United in March 1984. Phillips enjoyed a long spell at Oxford, remaining with the club until 1993, and he featured inthe club's only major honour to date, the 1986 Football League Cup Final. His final league season was with Northampton Town during the 1993–94 season.

He moved into non-league football with Marlow, and finished his playing career at Banbury United, before returning to Oxford United as a scout in 2008.

== Honours ==
Oxford United

- Football League Cup: 1985–86
