= Dave Langan =

Irish footballer

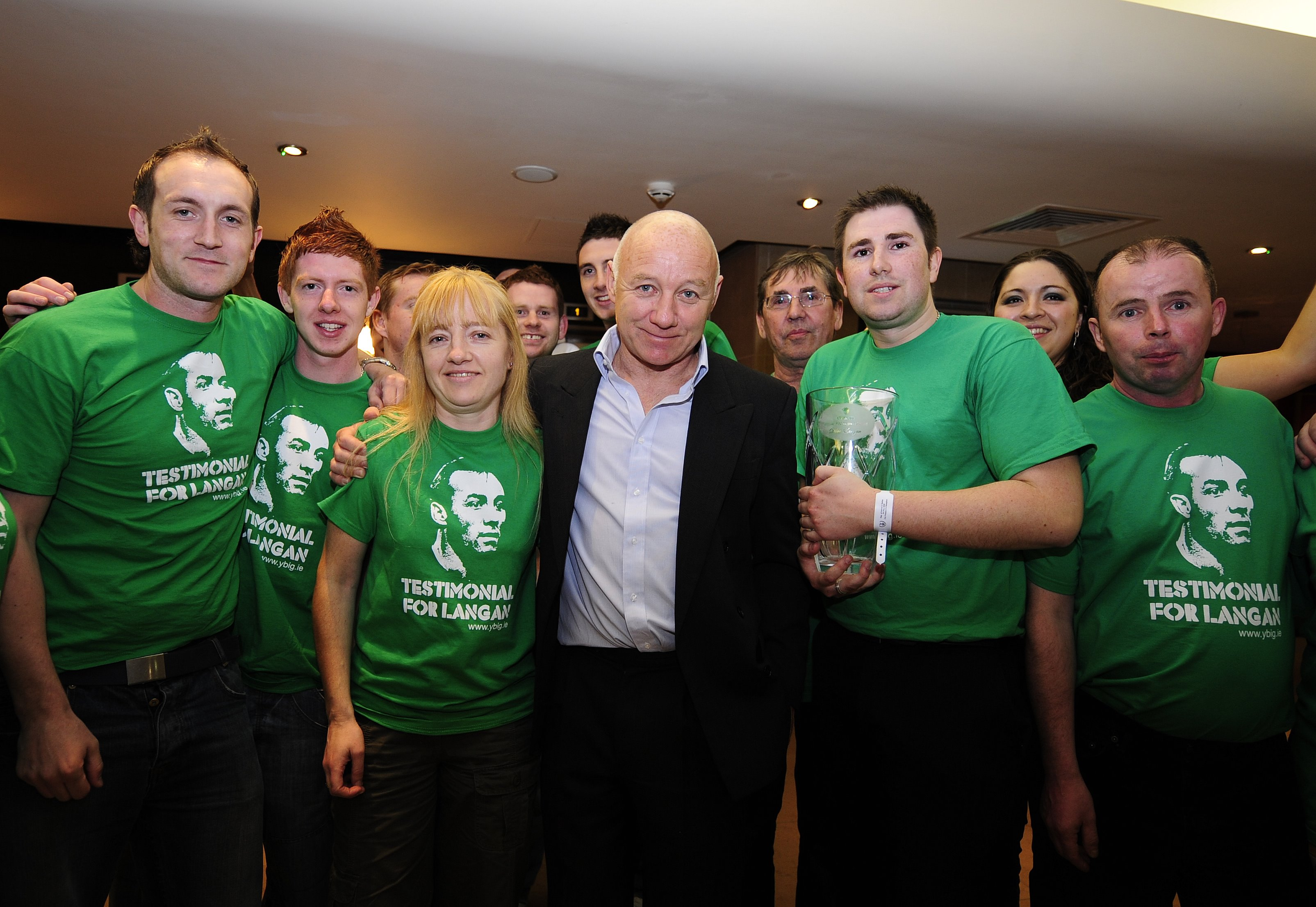
- Langan in Dublin with supporters of his testimonial

Personal information
- Full name: David Francis Langan
- Date of birth: 15 February 1957 (age 69)
- Place of birth: Dublin, Ireland
- Height: 5 ft 10 in (1.78 m)
- Position: Right back

Youth career
- 1972–1973: Cherry Orchard
- 1973–1977: Derby County

Senior career*
Years	Team	Apps	(Gls)
1977–1980	Derby County	143	(1)
1980–1984	Birmingham City	92	(3)
1984–1987	Oxford United	114	(2)
1987	→ Leicester City (loan)	5	(0)
1987–1988	AFC Bournemouth	20	(0)
1988–1989	Peterborough United	19	(0)

International career
1978–1987	Republic of Ireland	26	(0)
- * Club domestic league appearances and goals

David Francis Langan (born 15 February 1957) is an Irish former professional footballer who played as a right back for the Republic of Ireland, for whom he won 26 caps. Langan won his first cap against Turkey in April 1978 and was a regular in the squad until he sustained a knee injury in a 3–2 victory over France.

For four years he was in the international wilderness until his move to Oxford regenerated the form that earned him his first caps. He remained an ever-present throughout the course of the qualifying campaign for UEFA Euro 1988 in which he played four games. Despite public outcry, Langan was dropped for the adventure in the summer of 1988 in Germany and there ended his international career.

Langan played youth football with the Cherry Orchard club and was a youth international before going to England to join Derby County, for whom he made his debut in 1977 as a 19-year-old and went on to make over 150 senior appearances. Jim Smith then paid a club record £350,000 to take him to Birmingham City, for whom he played over 100 games and was Player of the Year in 1982, but when his career was disrupted by injury such that he missed a full 18 months, he was released by manager Ron Saunders. Jim Smith, by then managing Oxford United, signed him. He played 136 games for Oxford, winning the Second Division championship in 1984–85 and the League Cup the following year. He later played for AFC Bournemouth and Peterborough United, but his knee and back injuries put an early end to his career. He is now registered disabled.

On 14 June 1999, a benefit night was held in Ballyfermot for Langan in which his old teammate Paul McGrath showed up.

In late 2006, an interview with Langan entitled "I Was Just Unlucky" hit the press. This article inspired Ireland fans, many remembering that Langan "would have run through a wall for Ireland," to start campaigning to get Langan a testimonial. This campaign picked up speed in early 2008 when some of the people at its forefront went on RTÉ radio and started an online petition. This petition had over 1,000 signatures at the time this was written. Oxford United held a joint testimonial for Langan and Joey Beauchamp in 2011.

In 2012 Langan's autobiography Running through Walls was released.

== Honours ==
Oxford United

- Football League Second Division: 1984–85
- Football League Cup: 1985–86
