= Maurice Evans (footballer, born 1936) =

English footballer (1936–2000)

Personal information
- Full name: Maurice George Evans
- Date of birth: 22 September 1936
- Place of birth: Didcot, England
- Date of death: 18 August 2000 (aged 63)
- Place of death: Reading, England
- Position: Wing half

Senior career*
Years	Team	Apps	(Gls)
1955–1967	Reading	407	(13)

Managerial career
- 1972–1974: Shrewsbury Town
- 1977–1984: Reading
- 1985–1988: Oxford United
- 1993: Oxford United (caretaker)
- * Club domestic league appearances and goals

Maurice George Evans (22 September 1936 – 18 August 2000) was a football player with Reading, and later manager of Shrewsbury Town, Reading and Oxford United.

== Career ==
Evans was born in Didcot (now in Oxfordshire, but then in Berkshire) in 1936. He signed for Reading in 1952 as a ground staff junior, aged just 16. He soon won his place at left-half in the first team and held it throughout the adversities of working in the National Service with the RAF. He went on to make the wing-half position his own for the next ten seasons, and was a skilful, thoughtful player. The wing back also appeared to be without an ounce of malice in him, in him playing 459 first-team games without being booked once. He was selected as reserve for the Third Division South side against the North in April and October 1957. In compilation by the Royals' of their best-ever eleven, Evans was voted the best right-winger with 48.4% of the vote.

After leaving the club in 1967, he briefly took over as player-manager at Andover before joining Shrewsbury Town as player-coach, eventually becoming their manager in 1972. He returned to Elm Park as Charlie Hurley's assistant manager in 1974, and finally took over as manager in 1977. He managed the 1978–79 championship-winning team, securing the Manager Of The Year Award in the process. He remained Reading manager until 1984, making perceptive signings from non-league football such as Kerry Dixon, Trevor Senior and Paul Stanford. Dixon was later capped several times by England and for almost a decade was Chelsea's top goalscorer. Senior was a highly accomplished goalscorer for Reading, particularly when they won promotion to the Second Division as Third Division champions in 1985–86. Evans was also responsible for giving opportunities to the likes of Neil Webb, who went on to play for Nottingham Forest, Manchester United and England.

Evans then joined Oxford United as chief scout and youth development officer. He became the manager after the resignation of Jim Smith in the summer of 1985, and led the team in their first season in the top flight of English football. The season ended with United beating Queens Park Rangers (managed by Smith) 3–0 in the final of the League Cup at Wembley, and avoiding relegation by achieving the same scoreline over Arsenal in the last game of the season a week or so later. At the Wembley final, Evans famously sent up long-serving club physio Ken Fish in his place to collect his winner's medal, a gesture seen as typifying his modesty and generosity.

In November 1986 Oxford briefly occupied eighth place in the First Division — their highest standing to date — but they finished 18th in the final table and Evans resigned in March 1988 just before Oxford's relegation. He continued at the club in various capacities, including a brief stint as caretaker manager in 1993 and elevation to the board of directors in 1998, before rejoining Reading as chief scout in November 1999.

== Personal life ==
Evans died of a heart attack on 18 August 2000 at the age of 63. A plaque was placed in the wall of the Madejski Stadium by Reading F.C. in his memory, reading "Maurice Evans, 1936–2000. Player, Manager, Gentleman". A lounge at Oxford's Kassam Stadium is also named in his honour.

== Honours ==
=== Managerial ===
Reading

- Football League Fourth Division: 1978–79

Oxford United

- Football League Cup: 1985–86
