= Trevor Hebberd =

English footballer

Personal information
- Full name: Trevor Neal Hebberd
- Date of birth: 19 June 1958 (age 68)
- Place of birth: Winchester, England
- Position: Midfielder

Youth career
- 1974–1976: Southampton

Senior career*
Years	Team	Apps	(Gls)
1976–1982	Southampton	96	(8)
1978	→ Washington Diplomats (loan)	28	(9)
1981	→ Bolton Wanderers (loan)	6	(0)
1981	→ Leicester City (loan)	4	(1)
1982–1988	Oxford United	260	(37)
1988–1991	Derby County	81	(10)
1991	Portsmouth	4	(0)
1991–1994	Chesterfield	78	(1)
1994–1995	Lincoln City	25	(0)
1995	Grantham Town		
Total		582	(66)
- * Club domestic league appearances and goals

Trevor Neal Hebberd (born 19 June 1958) is an English retired footballer who played as a midfielder.

== Career ==
=== Southampton ===
Born in Winchester, Hampshire, he signed for Southampton on leaving school in 1974 and made his first team debut two years later in a 2–2 draw against Hull City at Boothferry Park in the Second Division. He managed 12 league appearances in 1976–77, scoring twice. He made 12 appearances again in the 1977–78 season, scoring once, as the Saints won promotion to the First Division – where they would remain for the next 27 years.

Hebberd established himself as a regular player in the 1979–80 season, but lost his place in the team a year later. He played 11 league games in 1980–81 and just four in 1981–82. He had played 95 league games for the Saints, scoring seven goals.

He remained at Southampton until 1982, when he was sold to Oxford United. During his final season at Southampton, he had loan spells with Bolton Wanderers and Leicester City.

=== Oxford United and Derby County ===
Hebberd was a key player in Oxford's Third Division title triumph in 1984 and their Second Division championship glory the following year. In 1986 he achieved the finest moment of his career by helping Oxford win the League Cup at Wembley with the opening goal in a 3–0 victory. He received the man of the match award.

When Oxford were relegated from the First Division in 1988, Hebberd was sold to Derby County and in his first season he helped them finish fifth in the league. But, like Oxford's League Cup triumph three years earlier, the ban on English clubs in European competition meant that Hebberd was unable to experience the UEFA Cup, and County were relegated to the Second Division two years later.

=== Later career ===
In the autumn of 1991, Hebberd spent a month on loan at Portsmouth before leaving the Baseball Ground for good and being signed by Fourth Division side Chesterfield. He spent three years at Saltergate before signing for Lincoln City.

Hebberd joined Lincoln for the 1994–95 season. He made his senior debut for them on the opening day of the campaign, in a 2–0 victory over Exeter City. He played in most league games for Lincoln up until his final match, against Hartlepool United on 4 March 1995. In total he made 33 appearances for Lincoln before being given a free transfer at the end of the season, later finishing his career at Southern League Grantham Town.

== Post-playing career ==
He later worked in a warehouse in Leicester.

== Honours ==
Oxford United

- Football League Third Division: 1983–84
- Football League Cup: 1985–86
