= Andy Thomas (footballer, born 1962) =

English footballer

Personal information
- Date of birth: 16 December 1962 (age 63)
- Place of birth: Oxford, England
- Height: 6 ft 0 in (1.83 m)
- Positions: Midfielder; forward

Youth career
- –1980: Oxford United

Senior career*
Years	Team	Apps	(Gls)
1980–1986	Oxford United	116	(32)
1982	→ Fulham (loan)	4	(2)
1983	→ Derby County (loan)	1	(0)
1986–1988	Newcastle United	31	(9)
1988–1989	Bradford City	23	(5)
1989–1991	Plymouth Argyle	50	(19)
1991–????	Oxford City		
Total		225	(64)

Managerial career
- 1994–1997: Oxford City
- 1997–1998: Chesham United
- * Club domestic league appearances and goals

Andy Thomas (born 16 December 1962) is an English retired professional footballer who played for Oxford United, Fulham, Derby County, Newcastle United, Bradford City and Plymouth Argyle. He later joined Oxford City, managing them between the 1994–95 and 1996–97 seasons. He also managed Chesham United during the 1997–98 season.

== Honours ==
Oxford United

- Football League Third Division: 1983–84
