= Jim Smith (footballer, born 1940) =

English footballer and manager (1940–2019)

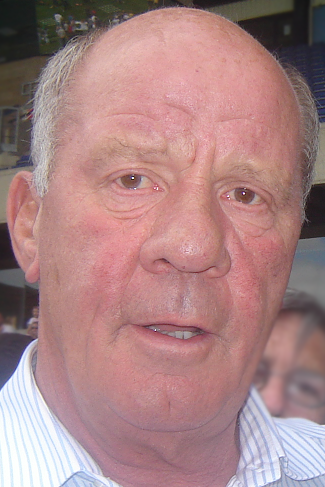
- Smith in 2006

Personal information
- Full name: James Michael Smith
- Date of birth: 17 October 1940
- Place of birth: Sheffield, England
- Date of death: 10 December 2019 (aged 79)
- Position: Wing half

Youth career
- Oaksfield
- 1957–1959: Sheffield United

Senior career*
Years	Team	Apps	(Gls)
1959–1961	Sheffield United	0	(0)
1961–1965	Aldershot	74	(1)
1965–1968	Halifax Town	113	(7)
1968–1969	Lincoln City	54	(0)
1969–1972	Boston United	123	(13)
1972–1973	Colchester United	8	(0)
Total		372	(8)

Managerial career
- 1969–1972: Boston United (player-manager)
- 1972–1975: Colchester United (player-manager)
- 1975–1978: Blackburn Rovers
- 1978–1982: Birmingham City
- 1982–1985: Oxford United
- 1985–1988: Queens Park Rangers
- 1988–1991: Newcastle United
- 1991–1995: Portsmouth
- 1995–2001: Derby County
- 2006–2007: Oxford United
- 2008: Oxford United (caretaker)
- * Club domestic league appearances and goals

James Michael Smith (17 October 1940 – 10 December 2019) was an English footballer and manager. As a player, he made 249 appearances in the Fourth Division of the Football League, representing Aldershot, Halifax Town, Lincoln City and Colchester United, and played for 3 1/2 years for Boston United of the Northern Premier League. He began a long managerial career with Boston United, and went on to take charge of top division clubs such as Birmingham City, Newcastle United and Derby County. Smith served as a member of the board of directors of Oxford United for three years from 2006 to 2009. He served as the League Managers' Association's chief executive and was inducted into their Hall of Fame for managing over 1000 matches. He was nicknamed "The Bald Eagle".

== Playing career ==
Smith was born in Sheffield and grew up a Sheffield Wednesday supporter, but began his playing career in 1957 when he signed for Sheffield United as an amateur, and turned professional with the club two years later. After failing to break into the first team he was transferred to Aldershot for the 1961–62 season.

At the beginning of the 1965–66 season, after scoring one goal in 74 league appearances, Smith left Aldershot to join Halifax Town. He made 113 league starts for Halifax, scoring seven goals, before moving to Lincoln City in 1968. After just over a year at Lincoln in which he made 54 appearances Smith signed for non-league club Boston United as player-manager; as player, he went on to make nearly 200 appearances for the club in all competitions.

== Managerial career ==
A good start to his managerial career at Boston – the club finished in the top four of the Northern Premier League in each of his first three seasons, he led them to the third round proper of the 1972 FA Cup, and in his fourth season, was 40 games into a run of 51 consecutive league games unbeaten, a British record at professional level – led to Colchester United offering Smith the position of manager in October 1972. In his autobiography, Smith said that he thought he got the job on the basis that he told the directors that he thought the team were "bloody awful" when watching a game with them, and they respected his honesty. He retained his playing registration for that season, but in 1973–74, he retired from playing and guided Colchester to promotion from the Football League Fourth Division.

In 1975, he quit the club to join Blackburn Rovers, newly promoted to the Second Division. He led Blackburn through one season of survival, one of establishment and was well into a promotion push in his third season when he left for First Division Birmingham City in March 1978 after Sir Alf Ramsey's resignation.

Birmingham were relegated from the First Division in Smith's first full season in charge, but he rebuilt the team, allowing many of the players who had won promotion in 1972 to leave, most notably making Trevor Francis the first £1 million player, a move which the board had not allowed Ramsey to make, and introducing both experienced players and promising youngsters.

Smith guided Birmingham back into the top flight the next season, and maintained them in mid-table in 1981. In early 1982, Ron Saunders walked out on Aston Villa, the club he had led to the League title the previous season; Birmingham promptly dismissed Smith and appointed Saunders. In his autobiography, Smith said he thought the decision by Birmingham to sack him was taken on the coach journey home from the final game of the season.

A few weeks later, Smith joined Oxford United as manager. He led them to the Third Division championship in 1984. The next year they were again promoted, reaching the top flight for the first time in their history, as Oxford won the Second Division championship. Despite this spectacular success, chairman Robert Maxwell failed to improve Smith's contract, which led to his resignation from Oxford to take the job of manager at Queens Park Rangers.

In his first year at QPR, Smith took the club to the League Cup final, where they lost 3–0 to his former club Oxford United. Smith continued to manage QPR until December 1988 when he left to become manager of Newcastle United. Newcastle finished bottom of the First Division in 1989; they came close to making an immediate return, finishing third in the league but losing 2–0 in the playoff semi-final to local rivals Sunderland at St James' Park. With no prospect of promotion by March 1991, Smith resigned amid a boardroom power struggle at the club.

He had a spell as coach at Middlesbrough under Colin Todd before accepting the appointment as manager of Portsmouth in the summer of 1991. He had a fairly successful reign at Fratton Park for four years, including reaching the FA Cup semi-finals in 1992, in which they took Liverpool to a replay before losing on penalties after extra time. A year later, a successful season in the league meant that they missed out on automatic promotion to the Premier League only on goal difference and then lost in the playoffs. Key players including Darren Anderton and Guy Whittingham were sold, and there was no money for adequate replacements. Smith was sacked in January 1995 after a decline in form left them struggling at the wrong end of Division One.

Smith became chief executive of the League Managers' Association in 1995, but returned to club management that summer with Derby County.

He brought in Steve McClaren as first-team coach, and in their first full season they guided Derby to runners-up spot in Division One and promotion to the Premier League. Derby finished in the top half of the table for their first three seasons in the top flight, but after two seasons where relegation was only narrowly avoided, Smith was offered, and declined, the post of Director of Football. He resigned in October 2001, to be replaced by Colin Todd. Derby had spent five consecutive seasons in the top flight under Jim Smith.

In January 2002, Smith was appointed assistant manager at Coventry City, working alongside Roland Nilsson. Smith and Nilsson were dismissed three months later, after presiding over performances described as "totally unacceptable" and failing to achieve a playoff place. Later that year, Harry Redknapp appointed Smith as his assistant at former club Portsmouth. Smith helped Redknapp win the Division One title at the first attempt in 2002–03, and played his part as the club established itself in the Premier League. In November 2004, both Smith and Redknapp resigned from Portsmouth after the appointment of a Director of Football. Redknapp became the manager of Southampton two weeks later, and after rejecting the position of chief scout, Smith was appointed his assistant. As part of a "cost-cutting exercise" following Southampton's relegation from the Premier League, Smith's initial six-month contract was not extended.

After nearly a year out of football, Smith returned to front-line management in March 2006 as manager of Oxford United for the second time, and was also given a seat on the board of directors.

He failed to stave off relegation to the Conference National, but they came close to an immediate return to the Football League, finishing second and losing on penalties in the 2006–07 play-off semi-final. In November 2007, after a poor start to the season, Smith decided it was time to "put the interests of the club before his own and ... step down as manager and concentrate on his director's role full-time".

Following the dismissal of Darren Patterson in November 2008, Smith took over as caretaker manager; the team remained unbeaten for the few weeks until Chris Wilder's appointment. Smith stepped down from the board in 2009.

== Death ==
Smith died on 10 December 2019 at the age of 79.

== Managerial statistics ==
Managerial record by team and tenure
Team	From	To	Record					Ref(s)
Team	From	To	P	W	D	L	Win %	Ref(s)
Boston United (player-manager)	9 August 1969	25 October 1972	218	120	57	41	55.05	
Colchester United (player-manager)	25 October 1972	20 June 1975	141	55	36	50	39.01	
Blackburn Rovers	20 June 1975	12 March 1978	141	51	37	53	36.17	
Birmingham City	12 March 1978	15 February 1982	182	59	50	73	32.42	
Oxford United	6 March 1982	11 June 1985	192	100	50	42	52.08	
Queens Park Rangers	11 June 1985	4 December 1988	169	67	38	64	39.64	
Newcastle United	10 December 1988	23 March 1991	126	46	38	42	36.51	
Portsmouth	1 June 1991	1 February 1995	213	89	56	68	41.78	(Note: Matches in competitions not covered by Soccerbase – 1991–92 Full Members' Cup (L1), 1992–93 Anglo-Italian Cup (W4 D1 L1) and 1993–94 Anglo-Italian Cup (W3 D1 L2) – sourced to the English National Football Archive.)
Derby County	15 June 1995	7 October 2001	281	99	81	101	35.23	
Oxford United	22 March 2006	1 November 2007	82	34	26	22	41.46	
Oxford United (caretaker)	30 November 2008	21 December 2008	4	2	2	0	50.00	
Total			1,749	722	471	556	41.28	

== Honours ==
=== Manager ===
Boston United

- Eastern Professional Floodlit Cup: 1971–72

Colchester United

- Football League Fourth Division promotion: 1973–74

Birmingham City

- Football League Second Division promotion: 1979–80

Oxford United

- Football League Second Division: 1984–85
- Football League Third Division: 1983–84

Queens Park Rangers

- Football League Cup runner-up: 1985–86

Derby County

- Football League First Division promotion: 1995–96

Individual

- Premier League Manager of the Month: November 1996

== See also ==
- List of football managers with the most matches
