= 1985–86 Football League Cup =

Milk Cup, League Cup
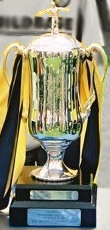
- The Milk Cup

Tournament details
- Country: England; Wales
- Teams: 92

Final positions
- Champions: Oxford United (1st title)
- Runners-up: Queens Park Rangers

Tournament statistics
- Top goal scorer: John Aldridge (5)

The 1985–86 Football League Cup (known as the Milk Cup for sponsorship reasons) was the 26th season of the Football League Cup, a knockout competition for England's top 92 football clubs.

The competition began on 20 August 1985, and ended with the final on 20 April 1986 at the Old Wembley Stadium. The cup was won by Oxford United, who beat Queens Park Rangers 3–0 in the final, to win their first major cup silverware. It was Oxford United's first season in Division One. Goals from Trevor Hebberd, Ray Houghton and Jeremy Charles sealed the victory. TV coverage of this competition only began after Christmas following the "blackout" where no club matches were shown for the first half of the season, and there was no UEFA Cup place for the winners as a result of the ban on English clubs that followed the Heysel Stadium disaster.

== First round ==
A total of 56 teams took part in the First Round. All of the Third Division and Fourth Division sides entered, with eight of the Second Division clubs also starting in this round. The eight clubs consisted of the three teams promoted from the Third Division and the five teams finishing 15th to 19th in the Second Division from the 1984–85 season. Each tie was played across two legs.

Home team	First Leg	Second Leg	Agg.	Away team	Dates	
Home team	First Leg	Second Leg	Agg.	Away team	First Leg	Second Leg
Aldershot	1–3	2–2	3–5	Leyton Orient	20 August 1985	3 September 1985
Bolton Wanderers	4–1	1–1	5–2	Stockport County	20 August 1985	3 September 1985
Bradford City	2–2	4–3	6–5	Chesterfield	21 August 1985	3 September 1985
Bristol Rovers	2–0	0–1	2–1	Newport County	20 August 1985	3 September 1985
Burnley	2–1	3–5	5–6	Bury	20 August 1985	3 September 1985
Cambridge United	1–1	0–2	1–3	Brentford	20 August 1985	3 September 1985
Cardiff City	2–1	1–3	3–4	Swansea City	20 August 1985	3 September 1985
Charlton Athletic	1–2	1–1	2–3	Crystal Palace	20 August 1985	3 September 1985
Colchester United	2–3	1–4	3–7	Millwall	21 August 1985	3 September 1985
Crewe Alexandra	3–3	4–3	7–6	Carlisle United	20 August 1985	3 September 1985
Darlington	3–2	0–0	3–2	Scunthorpe United	20 August 1985	10 September 1985
Derby County	3–0	0–2	3–2	Hartlepool United	21 August 1985	4 September 1985
Halifax Town	1–1	0–3	1–4	Hull City	20 August 1985	3 September 1985
Hereford United	5–1	0–2	5–3	Bristol City	21 August 1985	3 September 1985
Mansfield Town	2–0	4–4	6–4	Middlesbrough	21 August 1985	3 September 1985
Notts County	1–0	1–2	2–2	Doncaster Rovers	20 August 1985	3 September 1985
Peterborough United	0–0	0–2	0–2	Northampton Town	21 August 1985	3 September 1985
Plymouth Argyle	2–1	0–2	2–3	Exeter City	20 August 1985	4 September 1985
Preston North End	2–1	3–1	5–2	Blackpool	20 August 1985	3 September 1985
Reading	1–3	0–2	1–5	Bournemouth	21 August 1985	3 September 1985
Rotherham United	1–3	1–5	2–8	Sheffield United	20 August 1985	3 September 1985
Southend United	1–1	0–2	1–3	Gillingham	20 August 1985	3 September 1985
Torquay United	1–2	2–2	3–4	Swindon Town	20 August 1985	3 September 1985
Tranmere Rovers	1–3	0–0	1–3	Chester City	28 August 1985	4 September 1985
Walsall	4–1	1–0	5–1	Wolverhampton Wanderers	20 August 1985	3 September 1985
Wigan Athletic	2–1	0–2	2–3	Port Vale	20 August 1985	2 September 1985
Wrexham	4–0	1–2	5–2	Rochdale	20 August 1985	3 September 1985
York City	2–1	2–1	4–2	Lincoln City	20 August 1985	4 September 1985

== Second round ==
A total of 64 teams took part in the Second Round, including the 28 winners from round one. The remaining Second Division clubs entered in this round, as well as the 22 sides from the First Division. Each tie was again played across two legs.

Home team	First Leg	Second Leg	Agg.	Away team	Dates	
Home team	First Leg	Second Leg	Agg.	Away team	First Leg	Second Leg
Brentford	2–2	0–2	2–4	Sheffield Wednesday	25 September 1985	15 October 1985
Brighton and Hove Albion	5–2	2–0	7–2	Bradford City	25 September 1985	9 October 1985
Bristol Rovers	2–3	1–2	3–5	Birmingham City	24 September 1985	8 October 1985
Bury	1–2	1–2	2–4	Manchester City	25 September 1985	9 October 1985
Chester City	1–2	2–7	3–9	Coventry City	25 September 1985	9 October 1985
Crewe Alexandra	1–3	2–3	3–6	Watford	24 September 1985	8 October 1985
Crystal Palace	0–1	0–1	0–2	Manchester United	24 September 1985	9 October 1985
Derby County	2–0	1–1	3–1	Leicester City	25 September 1985	9 October 1985
Everton	3–2	2–0	5–2	Bournemouth	25 September 1985	7 October 1985
Exeter City	1–4	1–8	2–12	Aston Villa	25 September 1985	9 October 1985
Fulham	1–1	4–2	5–3	Notts County	24 September 1985	8 October 1985
Gillingham	1–3	1–2	2–5	Portsmouth	24 September 1985	8 October 1985
Grimsby Town	1–1	3–2	4–3	York City	24 September 1985	8 October 1985
Hereford United	0–0	1–2	1–2	Arsenal	25 September 1985	8 October 1985
Ipswich Town	3–1	4–1	7–2	Darlington	24 September 1985	8 October 1985
Leeds United	0–0	3–0	3–0	Walsall	25 September 1985	8 October 1985
Liverpool	3–0	5–2	8–2	Oldham Athletic	24 September 1985	9 October 1985
Mansfield Town	2–2	0–2	2–4	Chelsea	25 September 1985	9 October 1985
Millwall	0–0	0–0	0–0	Southampton	25 September 1985	8 October 1985
Newcastle United	0–0	1–1	1–1	Barnsley	25 September 1985	8 October 1985
Nottingham Forest	4–0	3–0	7–0	Bolton Wanderers	25 September 1985	8 October 1985
Leyton Orient	2–0	0–4	2–4	Tottenham Hotspur	23 September 1985	30 October 1985
Oxford United	2–1	2–0	4–1	Northampton Town	25 September 1985	8 October 1985
Preston North End	1–1	1–2	2–3	Norwich City	30 September 1985	9 October 1985
Queens Park Rangers	3–0	5–1	8–1	Hull City	24 September 1985	8 October 1985
Sheffield United	1–2	1–3	2–5	Luton Town	24 September 1985	8 October 1985
Shrewsbury Town	2–3	2–0	4–3	Huddersfield Town	24 September 1985	8 October 1985
Sunderland	3–2	1–3	4–5	Swindon Town	24 September 1985	8 October 1985
West Bromwich Albion	1–0	2–2	3–2	Port Vale	24 September 1985	8 October 1985
West Ham United	3–0	3–2	6–2	Swansea City	24 September 1985	8 October 1985
Wimbledon	5–0	1–2	6–2	Blackburn Rovers	24 September 1985	8 October 1985
Wrexham	0–1	0–1	0–2	Stoke City	24 September 1985	8 October 1985

== Third round ==
A total of 32 teams took part in the Third Round, all 32 winners from round two. Unlike the previous two rounds, this round was played over one leg.

=== Ties ===
Home team	Result	Away team	Date
Birmingham City	1–1	Southampton	29 October 1985
Chelsea	1–1	Fulham	29 October 1985
Coventry City	0–0	West Bromwich Albion	29 October 1985
Derby County	1–2	Nottingham Forest	30 October 1985
Grimsby Town	0–2	Ipswich Town	29 October 1985
Leeds United	0–3	Aston Villa	30 October 1985
Liverpool	4–0	Brighton and Hove Albion	29 October 1985
Luton Town	0–2	Norwich City	29 October 1985
Manchester City	1–2	Arsenal	30 October 1985
Manchester United	1–0	West Ham United	29 October 1985
Oxford United	3–1	Newcastle United	30 October 1985
Portsmouth	2–0	Stoke City	29 October 1985
Shrewsbury Town	1–4	Everton	29 October 1985
Swindon Town	1–0	Sheffield Wednesday	29 October 1985
Tottenham Hotspur	2–0	Wimbledon	6 November 1985
Watford	0–1	Queens Park Rangers	29 October 1985

=== Replays ===
Home team	Result	Away team	Date
Southampton	3–0	Birmingham City	6 November 1985
Fulham	0–1	Chelsea	6 November 1985
West Bromwich Albion	4–3	Coventry City	6 November 1985

== Fourth round ==
A total of 16 teams took part in the Fourth Round, all 16 winners from round three. Once again this round was played over one leg.

=== Ties ===
Home team	Result	Away team	Date
Arsenal	0–0	Southampton	19 November 1985
Aston Villa	2–2	West Bromwich Albion	19 November 1985
Chelsea	2–2	Everton	26 November 1985
Ipswich Town	6–1	Swindon Town	26 November 1985
Liverpool	2–1	Manchester United	26 November 1985
Oxford United	3–1	Norwich City	19 November 1985
Queens Park Rangers	3–1	Nottingham Forest	25 November 1985
Tottenham Hotspur	0–0	Portsmouth	19 November 1985

=== Replays ===
Home team	Result	Away team	Date
Southampton	0–3	Arsenal	26 November 1985
West Bromwich Albion	1–2	Aston Villa	26 November 1985
Everton	1–2	Chelsea	10 December 1985
Portsmouth	0–0	Tottenham Hotspur	27 November 1985

=== 2nd Replay ===
Home team	Result	Away team	Date
Tottenham Hotspur	0–1	Portsmouth	10 December 1985

== Fifth round ==
The eight winners from the Fourth Round took part in the Fifth Round. Once again this round was played over one leg.

=== Ties ===
Home team	Result	Away team	Date
Aston Villa	1–1	Arsenal	22 January 1986
Liverpool	3–0	Ipswich Town	21 January 1986
Oxford United	3–1	Portsmouth	22 January 1986
Queens Park Rangers	1–1	Chelsea	22 January 1986

=== Replays ===
Home team	Result	Away team	Date
Arsenal	1–2	Aston Villa	4 February 1986
Chelsea	0–2 after extra time	Queens Park Rangers	29 January 1986

== Semi-finals ==
As with the first two rounds, the semi-final ties were played over two legs. Favourites Liverpool, in search of a unique domestic treble, were surprisingly beaten by QPR, while Oxford United eased past Aston Villa in the other semi-final.

=== First leg ===
12 February 1986

Queens Park Rangers	1–0	Liverpool
Fenwick 22'

Loftus Road, London
Attendance: 15,051
Referee: George Courtney (Spennymoor)
4 March 1986

Aston Villa	2–2	Oxford United
Birch 33'; Stainrod 56'		John Aldridge 8', 57' (pen.)

Villa Park, Birmingham
Attendance: 23,098
Referee: Joe Worrall (Warrington)

=== Second leg ===
5 March 1986

Liverpool	2–2	Queens Park Rangers
McMahon 42'; Johnston 69'		Whelan 58' (o.g.); Gillespie 84' (o.g.)

Anfield, Liverpool
Attendance: 23,863
Referee: David Hutchinson (Harrogate)

QPR win 3–2 on aggregate

12 March 1986

Oxford United	2–1	Aston Villa
Phillips 57'; Charles 73'		Walters 87'

Manor Ground, Oxford
Attendance: 13,989
Referee: Alan Robinson (Waterlooville)

Oxford win 4–3 on aggregate

== Final ==
20 April 1986

Oxford United	3–0	Queens Park Rangers
Hebberd 40'; Houghton 52'; Charles 86'

Wembley Stadium, London
Attendance: 90,396
Referee: Keith Hackett
