= 1999–2000 Oxford United F.C. season =

English football club season

Oxford United
1999–2000 season
- Manager: Malcolm Shotton (until October); Mickey Lewis (until February); Denis Smith
- Football League Second Division: 20th
- FA Cup: Fourth round
- League Cup: Third round
- Football League Trophy: Quarter final
- Top goalscorer: Matt Murphy (17)

During the 1999–2000 English football season, Oxford United F.C. competed in the Football League Second Division where they finished in 20th position avoiding relegation to Division Three by a single point.

== Season summary ==
After an inconsistent start, a run of seven defeats in eight games cost manager Malcolm Shotton his job by the end of October, and made it apparent that the club would be fighting to avoid a second successive relegation. Mickey Lewis became caretaker manager, assisted by former manager Maurice Evans, and oversaw an initial upturn in form that saw the team begin to climb up the table. A poor run of form after Christmas plunged the team straight back into relegation trouble, however, leading to Lewis stepping aside in favour of another former manager, Denis Smith, in February. Results remained inconsistent at best, but in the end the team did enough to just barely avoid relegation.

== Final league table ==
Pos	Team	Pld	W	D	L	GF	GA	GD	Pts	Promotion or relegation
18	Colchester United	46	14	10	22	59	82	−23	52	
19	Cambridge United	46	12	12	22	64	65	−1	48	
20	Oxford United	46	12	9	25	43	73	−30	45	
21	Cardiff City (R)	46	9	17	20	45	67	−22	44	Relegation to the Third Division
22	Blackpool (R)	46	8	17	21	49	77	−28	41	Relegation to the Third Division

Rules for classification: 1) Points; 2) Goal difference; 3) Goals scored
(R) Relegated

== Results ==
Oxford United's score comes first

=== Legend ===
Win	Draw	Loss

=== Football League Division Two ===
Match	Date	Opponent	Venue	Result	Attendance	Scorers
1	7 August 1999	Stoke City	A	2–1	11,300	Murphy 28', Anthrobus 78'
2	14 August 1999	Cardiff City	H	2–3	6,423	Murphy 67', 73'
3	21 August 1999	Bristol Rovers	A	0–1	7,617	
4	28 August 1999	Oldham Athletic	H	1–0	5,098	Murphy 18' (pen)
5	30 August 1999	Blackpool	A	1–1	3,670	Lilley 57'
6	4 September 1999	Wycombe Wanderers	H	0–0	6,306	
7	11 September 1999	Gillingham	H	1–2	5,418	Cook 90'
8	18 September 1999	Wrexham	A	0–1	4,229	
9	25 September 1999	Luton Town	A	2–4	6,102	Powell 59', Lilley 65'
10	2 October 1999	Bristol City	H	3–0	6,638	Beauchamp 7', 33', Lilley 66'
11	9 October 1999	Millwall	H	1–3	5,392	Murphy 66' (pen)
12	16 October 1999	Brentford	A	0–2	6,237	
13	19 October 1999	Scunthorpe United	A	0–1	3,829	
14	23 October 1999	Luton Town	H	0–1	5,866	
15	2 November 1999	Colchester United	H	1–1	4,444	Lambert 1'
16	7 November 1999	Reading	A	2–1	10,101	Folland 7', Murphy 84'
17	13 November 1999	Bury	H	1–1	4,318	Lambert 9'
18	23 November 1999	Notts County	A	1–0	4,020	Warren 85' (o.g.)
19	27 November 1999	Chesterfield	A	0–0	2,768	
20	4 December 1999	Stoke City	H	1–1	5,700	Beauchamp 27'
21	18 December 1999	Bournemouth	A	0–4	4,443	
22	18 December 1999	Cambridge United	H	1–0	6,772	Murphy 83'
23	28 December 1999	Burnley	A	2–3	14,218	Anthrobus 3', Whelan 52'
24	3 January 2000	Wigan Athletic	H	1–2	5,915	Cook 60'
25	15 January 2000	Cardiff City	A	1–1	6,914	Murphy 44'
26	23 January 2000	Bristol Rovers	H	0–5	7,355	
27	29 January 2000	Oldham Athletic	A	0–2	4,780	
28	1 February 2000	Preston North End	H	0–4	5,164	
29	5 February 2000	Blackpool	H	0–1	5,179	
30	12 February 2000	Wycombe Wanderers	A	1–0	6,200	Beauchamp 26'
31	19 February 2000	Chesterfield	H	2–1	5,146	Fear 10', Lilley 89'
32	26 February 2000	Wrexham	H	1–4	4,988	Edwards 71'
33	4 March 2000	Gillingham	A	0–1	6,996	
34	7 March 2000	Reading	H	1–3	7,638	Powell 8'
35	11 March 2000	Colchester United	A	2–1	4,058	S Weatherstone 22', Whelan 90'
36	14 March 2000	Preston North End	A	1–3	12,008	Murphy 64'
37	18 March 2000	Notts County	H	2–3	4,544	Powell 7', 76' (1 pen)
38	21 March 2000	Bury	A	2–1	2,606	Lilley 9', Cook 90'
39	25 March 2000	Cambridge United	A	0–2	5,127	
40	1 April 2000	Bournemouth	H	1–0	5,214	Lilley 31'
41	8 April 2000	Wigan Athletic	A	0–2	4,848	
42	15 April 2000	Burnley	H	1–2	7,549	Murphy 13'
43	22 April 2000	Brentford	A	1–1	5,342	Lilley 41'
44	24 April 2000	Bristol City	A	2–2	9,046	Powell 10', Davis 68'
45	29 April 2000	Scunthorpe United	H	2–0	6,752	Murphy 26', Powell 70'
46	6 May 2000	Millwall	A	0–1	13,827	

=== League Cup ===
Round	Date	Opponent	Venue	Result	Attendance	Scorers
R1 1st Leg	10 August 1999	Southend United	A	2–0	2,618	Murphy 53', Beauchamp 81'
R1 2nd Leg	24 August 1999	Southend United	H	1–0	4,162	Murphy 61'
R2 1st Leg	14 September 1999	Everton	H	1–1	7,345	Murphy 21'
R2 2nd Leg	22 September 1999	Everton	A	1–0	10,006	Beauchamp 12'
R3	12 October 1999	Tranmere Rovers	A	0–2	5,328	

=== FA Cup ===
Round	Date	Opponent	Venue	Result	Attendance	Scorers
R1	30 October 1999	Morecambe	H	3–2	3,504	Lilley 12', Powell 58', Abbey 87'
R2	20 November 1999	Shrewsbury Town	A	2–2	3,557	Murphy 63', Folland 77'
R2 Replay	30 November 1999	Shrewsbury Town	H	2–1 AET	4,096	Murphy 90', 117'
R3	10 December 1999	Nottingham Forest	A	1–1	8,079	Powell 75'
R3 Replay	8 January 2000	Nottingham Forest	H	1–3	7,191	Powell 72'

=== Football League Trophy ===
Round	Date	Opponent	Venue	Result	Attendance	Scorers
R1	7 December 1999	Luton Town	H	2–0	1,220	Powell 40', 48 (2 pen)
R2	11 January 2000	Wycombe Wanderers	H	1–1 (5–3 pens)	1,798	Powell 21' (pen)
Quarter final	25 January 2000	Brentford	A	0–2	2,942	

== Squad statistics ==
No.	Pos.	Name	League		FA Cup		League Cup		League Trophy		Total	
No.	Pos.	Name	Apps	Goals	Apps	Goals	Apps	Goals	Apps	Goals	Apps	Goals
1	GK	(South Africa) Andre Arendse	13	0	1(1)	0	4	0	0	0	18(1)	0
2	DF	(England) Les Robinson	46	0	5	0	5	0	3	0	59	0
3	MF	(England) Paul Powell	39(1)	6	3(1)	3	5	0	2	3	49(2)	12
4	MF	(England) Peter Fear	13(6)	1	1(1)	0	3	0	2	0	19(7)	1
5	DF	(Canada) Mark Watson	34(1)	0	5	0	2	0	1	0	42(1)	0
6	FW	(England) Craig Russell	5(1)	0	0	0	0	0	0	0	5(1)	0
6	MF	(England) Eddie Newton	7	0	0	0	0	0	0	0	7	0
6	DF	(England) Phil Gilchrist	1	0	0	0	0	0	0	0	1	0
7	FW	(England) Matt Murphy	46	11	5	3	5	3	2	0	58	17
8	MF	(England) Paul Tait	34	0	2	0	5	0	2	0	43	0
9	FW	(England) Steve Anthrobus	25(11)	2	3(1)	0	4	0	2	0	34(12)	2
10	FW	(England) Derek Lilley	36(8)	7	5	1	3(2)	0	1	0	45(10)	8
11	MF	(England) Joey Beauchamp	33(1)	4	5	0	5	0	1(2)	0	44(3)	4
12	MF	(England) Jamie Cook	11(18)	3	1(3)	0	1(3)	0	3	0	16(24)	3
13	GK	(Sweden) Paul Lundin	21(1)	0	4	0	1	0	3	0	29(1)	0
14	DF	(England) Steve Davis	20(4)	1	1	0	4	0	0(1)	0	25(5)	1
15	MF	(England) Simon Weatherstone	13(7)	1	0	0	1(1)	0	1	0	15(8)	1
16	FW	(Wales) Rob Folland	17(6)	1	4(1)	1	4	0	1	0	26(7)	1
17	DF	(England) Jon Shepheard	1(1)	0	0	0	0	0	2	0	3(1)	0
18	MF	(England) Chris Hackett	0(2)	0	0	0	0	0	0	0	0(2)	0
18	FW	(Saint Kitts and Nevis) Kevin Francis	0(3)	0	0(1)	0	0	0	0(1)	0	0(5)	0
19	DF	(England) Phil Whelan	31	2	5	0	1	0	3	0	40(1)	2
20	FW	(England) Nicky Banger	1(2)	0	0	0	0(1)	0	0	0	2(2)	0
21	DF	(Scotland) Neil McGowan	15(5)	0	2(1)	0	0(2)	0	2	0	19(8)	0
22	DF	(England) Mickey Lewis	3(2)	0	0	0	2(1)	0	0	0	5(3)	0
23	DF	(England) Ross Weatherstone	3(1)	0	1	0	0	0	2	0	5(1)	0
24	MF	(England) Jamie Lambert	8(5)	2	2(1)	0	0	0	0	0	10(6)	2
24	FW	(England) Nigel Jemson	13(5)	0	0	0	0	0	0	0	13(5)	0
25	FW	(England) Ben Abbey	0(10)	0	0(1)	1	0	0	0(2)	0	0(13)	1
27	MF	(England) Dean Whitehead	0	0	0	0	0	0	0(1)	0	0(1)	0
29	GK	(England) Richard Knight	12(1)	0	0	0	0	0	0	0	12(1)	0
30	DF	(Wales) Christian Edwards	5	1	0	0	0	0	0	0	5	1

== See also ==
- 1999–2000 in English football
