= 1998–99 Oxford United F.C. season =

English football club season

Oxford United
1998–99 season
- Manager: Malcolm Shotton
- Stadium: Manor Ground
- First Division: 23rd (relegated)
- FA Cup: Fourth round
- League Cup: First round
- Top goalscorer: League: Windass (15); All: Windass (18)
- Average home league attendance: 7,040

During the 1998–99 English football season, Oxford United F.C. competed in the Football League First Division.

== Season summary ==
During October 1998, the backroom staff at Oxford United were unpaid due to the club's financial situation with the new stadium; the threat of administration caused a group of fans to set up a pressure group called Fighting for Oxford United's Life (FOUL). The group began to publicise the club's plight through a series of meetings and events, including a 'Scarf of Unity', which was a collection of scarfs from various clubs which was long enough to stretch around the perimeter of the pitch. Chairman Robin Herd stepped down to concentrate on his engineering projects, and in April 1999 Firoz Kassam bought Herd's 89.9% controlling interest in Oxford United for £1, with which he also inherited the club's estimated £15 million debt. Kassam reduced the £9 million of the debt to just £900,000, by virtue of a Company Voluntary Arrangement, by which unsecured creditors who were owed over £1,000 were reimbursed with 10p for every pound they were owed. Secured creditors were paid off when Kassam sold the Manor to another of his companies, for £6 million. Kassam set about completing the unfinished stadium, gaining planning permission for a bowling alley, a multiplex cinema, and a hotel to sit next to the stadium, following a series of legal battles which were eventually all settled. The season ended with relegation back to the Second Division.

== Final league table ==
Pos	Team	Pld	W	D	L	GF	GA	GD	Pts	Qualification or relegation
20	Queens Park Rangers	46	12	11	23	52	61	−9	47	
21	Port Vale	46	13	8	25	45	75	−30	47	
22	Bury (R)	46	10	17	19	35	60	−25	47	Relegation to the Second Division
23	Oxford United (R)	46	10	14	22	48	71	−23	44	Relegation to the Second Division
24	Bristol City (R)	46	9	15	22	57	80	−23	42	Relegation to the Second Division

Rules for classification: 1) Points; 2) Goals scored; 3) Goal difference
(R) Relegated

== Results ==
Oxford United's score comes first

=== Legend ===
Win	Draw	Loss

=== Football League First Division ===
Date	Opponent	Venue	Result	Attendance	Scorers
8 August 1998	Bristol City	A	2–2	13,729	Murphy, Windass
15 August 1998	Wolverhampton Wanderers	H	0–2	7,521	
22 August 1998	Crystal Palace	A	0–2	14,827	
29 August 1998	Grimsby Town	H	0–0	5,587	
31 August 1998	Barnsley	A	0–1	15,328	
6 September 1998	Portsmouth	H	3–0	6,626	Marsh, Windass (2, 1 pen)
9 September 1998	Swindon Town	A	1–4	8,305	Banger
12 September 1998	Ipswich Town	H	3–3	6,632	Banger, Windass, Thomson
19 September 1998	Sunderland	A	0–7	34,567	
26 September 1998	Queens Park Rangers	H	4–1	7,489	Beauchamp, Murphy, Thomson, Windass
29 September 1998	West Bromwich Albion	H	3–0	7,437	Beauchamp, Powell, Marsh
3 October 1998	Huddersfield Town	A	0–2	10,968	
10 October 1998	Tranmere Rovers	H	1–2	5,862	Windass
17 October 1998	Bolton Wanderers	A	1–1	17,064	Thomson
20 October 1998	Bury	A	0–1	3,436	
24 October 1998	Sheffield United	H	0–2	6,586	
31 October 1998	Crewe Alexandra	H	1–1	5,607	Windass
7 November 1998	Watford	A	0–2	10,137	
14 November 1998	Birmingham City	A	1–0	18,216	Murphy
21 November 1998	Port Vale	H	2–1	5,964	Windass (pen), Powell
29 November 1998	Norwich City	A	3–1	17,851	Wilsterman, Windass, Thomson
5 December 1998	Bradford City	H	0–1	5,969	
12 December 1998	Birmingham City	H	1–7	7,189	Windass
19 December 1998	Stockport County	A	0–2	6,500	
26 December 1998	Crystal Palace	H	1–3	8,375	Windass
28 December 1998	Portsmouth	A	2–2	12,604	Banger (2)
9 January 1999	Bristol City	H	0–0	9,434	
16 January 1999	Grimsby Town	A	0–1	6,626	
30 January 1999	Barnsley	H	1–0	6,174	Windass
6 February 1999	Wolverhampton Wanderers	A	1–1	20,811	Windass
13 February 1999	Swindon Town	H	2–0	8,179	Windass (2, 1 pen)
20 February 1999	Ipswich Town	A	1–2	16,920	Rémy
27 February 1999	Sunderland	H	0–0	9,044	
3 March 1999	Queens Park Rangers	A	0–1	9,040	
6 March 1999	West Bromwich Albion	A	0–2	13,875	
9 March 1999	Huddersfield Town	H	2–2	6,034	Cook, Beauchamp
13 March 1999	Watford	H	0–0	8,137	
20 March 1999	Crewe Alexandra	A	1–3	4,791	Thomson
26 March 1999	Sheffield United	A	2–1	14,115	Thomson, Banger
3 April 1999	Bolton Wanderers	H	0–0	7,547	
5 April 1999	Tranmere Rovers	A	2–2	7,837	Weatherstone, Gilchrist
10 April 1999	Bury	H	0–1	6,358	
17 April 1999	Port Vale	A	0–1	7,393	
24 April 1999	Norwich City	H	2–4	7,345	Wilsterman, Francis
1 May 1999	Bradford City	A	0–0	15,064	
9 May 1999	Stockport County	H	5–0	6,830	Gilchrist, Powell, Beauchamp, Murphy, Thomson

=== FA Cup ===
Round	Date	Opponent	Venue	Result	Attendance	Goalscorers
R3	2 January 1999	Crewe Alexandra	A	3–1	4,207	Windass, Murphy (2)
R4	25 January 1999	Chelsea	H	1–1	9,059	Windass
R4R	3 February 1999	Chelsea	A	2–4	32,106	Gilchrist, Windass (pen)

=== League Cup ===
Round	Date	Opponent	Venue	Result	Attendance	Goalscorers
R1 1st Leg	11 August 1998	Luton Town	A	3–2	3,165	Murphy (2), Weatherstone
R1 2nd Leg	18 August 1998	Luton Town	H	1–3 (lost 4–5 on agg)	5,099	Whelan

== Squad ==
Note: Flags indicate national team as defined under FIFA eligibility rules; some limited exceptions apply. Players may hold more than one non-FIFA nationality.

No.	Pos.	Nation	Player
-	GK	(England) ENG	Paul Gerrard (on loan from Everton)
-	DF	(England) ENG	Les Robinson
-	DF	(England) ENG	Phil Gilchrist
-	DF	(Canada) CAN	Mark Watson
-	MF	(England) ENG	Paul Powell
-	MF	(England) ENG	Martin Gray
-	MF	(England) ENG	Joey Beauchamp
-	FW	(England) ENG	Matt Murphy
-	FW	(Scotland) SCO	Andy Thomson
-	FW	(England) ENG	Nicky Banger
-	MF	(England) ENG	Paul Tait
-	GK	(Sweden) SWE	Pål Lundin
-	DF	(England) ENG	Phil Whelan

No.	Pos.	Nation	Player
-	FW	(Saint Kitts and Nevis) SKN	Kevin Francis
-	DF	(Netherlands) NED	Brian Wilsterman
-	FW	(Wales) WAL	Rob Folland
-	DF	(France) FRA	Christophe Rémy
-	FW	(England) ENG	Jamie Cook
-	MF	(England) ENG	Simon Weatherstone
-	MF	(England) ENG	Tony Wright
-	DF	(England) ENG	Mark Warren (on loan from Leyton Orient)
-	MF	(England) ENG	Mickey Lewis
-	DF	(England) ENG	Steve Davis
-	DF	(England) ENG	Andrew Rose
-	FW	(England) ENG	Mike Williams
-	GK	(England) ENG	Elliot Jackson

=== Left club during the season ===
Note: Flags indicate national team as defined under FIFA eligibility rules; some limited exceptions apply. Players may hold more than one non-FIFA nationality.

No.	Pos.	Nation	Player
-	MF	(England) ENG	Danny Hill (to Cardiff City)
-	GK	(England) ENG	Phil Whitehead (to West Bromwich Albion)
-	DF	(England) ENG	Simon Marsh (to Birmingham City)

No.	Pos.	Nation	Player
-	GK	(England) ENG	Mike Salmon (on loan from Charlton Athletic)
-	MF	(England) ENG	David Smith (to Stockport County)
-	FW	(England) ENG	Dean Windass (to Bradford City)
