= 1997–98 Oxford United F.C. season =

English football club season

Oxford United F.C.
1997–98 season
- Manager: Denis Smith (until 24 December); Malcolm Crosby (caretaker from 24 December - 24 January); Malcolm Shotton (from 24 January)
- Stadium: Manor Ground
- First Division: 12th
- FA Cup: Third round
- League Cup: Fourth round
- Top goalscorer: League: Beauchamp (13); All: Beauchamp (19)
- Average home league attendance: 7,512

During the 1997–98 English football season, Oxford United F.C. competed in the Football League First Division.

== Season summary ==
In the 1997–98 season, Denis Smith resigned in December with the club £10 million in debt. He was replaced in January by Malcolm Shotton. His appointment was popular and initially successful, as he led the team out of relegation danger to a creditable 12th-place finish in Division One.

== Final league table ==
Pos	Team	Pld	W	D	L	GF	GA	GD	Pts
10	West Bromwich Albion	46	16	13	17	50	56	−6	61
11	Crewe Alexandra	46	18	5	23	58	65	−7	59
12	Oxford United	46	16	10	20	60	64	−4	58
13	Bradford City	46	14	15	17	46	59	−13	57
14	Tranmere Rovers	46	14	14	18	54	57	−3	56

Source: Statto.com
Rules for classification: 1) Points; 2) Goals scored; 3) Goal difference

== Results ==
Oxford United's score comes first

=== Legend ===
Win	Draw	Loss

=== Football League First Division ===
Date	Opponent	Venue	Result	Attendance	Scorers
9 August 1997	Huddersfield Town	H	2–0	7,085	Jemson (pen), Aldridge
16 August 1997	Charlton Athletic	A	2–3	10,230	Purse, Jemson (pen)
23 August 1997	Nottingham Forest	H	0–1	9,486	
30 August 1997	Portsmouth	A	1–2	10,209	B Ford
2 September 1997	Sunderland	A	1–3	27,643	Angel
7 September 1997	Wolverhampton Wanderers	H	3–0	6,921	Beauchamp (2), B Ford
13 September 1997	Reading	A	1–2	9,003	Jemson
20 September 1997	Sheffield United	H	2–4	7,514	Jemson (2)
27 September 1997	Bradford City	H	0–0	6,468	
4 October 1997	West Bromwich Albion	A	2–1	15,819	Banger, Purse
11 October 1997	Stockport County	A	2–3	7,333	Purse, Aldridge
18 October 1997	Ipswich Town	H	1–0	7,594	Smith
21 October 1997	Middlesbrough	H	1–4	8,306	Purse
25 October 1997	Birmingham City	A	0–0	16,352	
1 November 1997	Manchester City	H	0–0	8,592	
4 November 1997	Stoke City	A	0–0	10,132	
8 November 1997	Crewe Alexandra	A	1–2	4,524	M Ford
15 November 1997	Bury	H	1–1	5,811	Banger
22 November 1997	Norwich City	A	1–2	11,241	Powell
29 November 1997	Port Vale	H	2–0	5,762	Beauchamp, Jemson
6 December 1997	Swindon Town	A	1–4	10,902	M Ford
12 December 1997	Queens Park Rangers	H	3–1	6,664	Jemson, Beauchamp (2)
20 December 1997	Tranmere Rovers	A	2–0	5,181	Massey, Robinson
26 December 1997	Wolverhampton Wanderers	A	0–1	26,238	
28 December 1997	Sunderland	H	1–1	8,659	Jemson (pen)
10 January 1998	Huddersfield Town	A	1–5	10,378	Gray
17 January 1998	Charlton Athletic	H	1–2	7,234	Jemson
24 January 1998	Portsmouth	H	1–0	7,402	Beauchamp
31 January 1998	Nottingham Forest	A	3–1	18,392	Beauchamp (2), Weatherstone
7 February 1998	Sheffield United	A	0–1	16,881	
17 February 1998	West Bromwich Albion	H	2–1	9,412	Gilchrist, Francis
21 February 1998	Bradford City	A	0–0	14,190	
24 February 1998	Ipswich Town	A	2–5	11,824	Francis, Donaldson (pen)
28 February 1998	Stockport County	H	3–0	6,650	Davis, Donaldson, Francis
3 March 1998	Crewe Alexandra	H	0–0	6,069	
7 March 1998	Manchester City	A	2–0	28,720	Beauchamp, Cook
14 March 1998	Stoke City	H	5–1	7,300	Murphy (2), Francis (2), Beauchamp
17 March 1998	Reading	H	3–0	8,103	Beauchamp (2), Gray
21 March 1998	Bury	A	0–1	5,159	
28 March 1998	Norwich City	H	2–0	7,869	Francis, Beauchamp (pen)
4 April 1998	Port Vale	A	0–3	6,524	
11 April 1998	Swindon Town	H	2–1	8,005	Francis, Gilchrist
14 April 1998	Queens Park Rangers	A	1–1	12,859	Davis
18 April 1998	Tranmere Rovers	H	1–1	6,489	Cook
25 April 1998	Birmingham City	H	0–2	8,818	
3 May 1998	Middlesbrough	A	1–4	30,228	Banger

=== FA Cup ===
Round	Date	Opponent	Venue	Result	Attendance	Goalscorers
R3	3 January 1998	Leeds United	A	0–4	20,568	

=== League Cup ===
Round	Date	Opponent	Venue	Result	Attendance	Goalscorers
R1 First Leg	12 August 1997	Plymouth Argyle	H	2–0	5,083	Purse, Logan (own goal)
R1 Second Leg	26 August 1997	Plymouth Argyle	A	5–3 (won 7–3 on agg)	3,037	Beauchamp (2), Jemson, Purse, Murphy
R2 First Leg	16 September 1997	York City	H	4–1	2,923	Robinson, Aldridge, Beauchamp (2)
R2 Second Leg	23 September 1997	York City	A	2–1 (won 6–2 on agg)	1,555	Aldridge, Banger
R3	14 October 1997	Tranmere Rovers	H	1–1 (won 6–5 on pens)	3,878	Beauchamp
R4	18 November 1997	Ipswich Town	H	1–2 (a.e.t.)	5,723	Beauchamp

== Squad ==
Note: Flags indicate national team as defined under FIFA eligibility rules; some limited exceptions apply. Players may hold more than one non-FIFA nationality.

No.	Pos.	Nation	Player
—	GK	(England) ENG	Phil Whitehead
—	DF	(England) ENG	Les Robinson
—	DF	(England) ENG	Phil Gilchrist
—	DF	(England) ENG	Darren Purse
—	DF	(England) ENG	Mike Ford
—	MF	(England) ENG	Joey Beauchamp
—	MF	(England) ENG	David Smith
—	MF	(England) ENG	Martin Gray
—	FW	(England) ENG	Nigel Jemson
—	FW	(England) ENG	Nicky Banger
—	FW	(England) ENG	Matt Murphy
—	MF	(England) ENG	Bobby Ford
—	DF	(England) ENG	Steve Davis
—	FW	(Saint Kitts and Nevis) SKN	Kevin Francis
—	DF	(Netherlands) NED	Brian Wilsterman
—	GK	(Netherlands) NED	Arjan van Heusden
—	MF	(England) ENG	Stuart Massey

No.	Pos.	Nation	Player
—	FW	(England) ENG	Martin Aldridge
—	DF	(France) FRA	Christophe Rémy
—	DF	(England) ENG	Simon Marsh
—	MF	(England) ENG	Paul Powell
—	FW	(England) ENG	Mark Angel
—	FW	(England) ENG	Jamie Cook
—	DF	(England) ENG	Phil Whelan
—	FW	(England) ENG	O'Neill Donaldson
—	GK	(England) ENG	Elliot Jackson
—	MF	(England) ENG	Simon Weatherstone
—	FW	(Wales) WAL	Rob Folland
—	DF	(England) ENG	Andrew Rose
—	DF	(England) ENG	Mark Stevens
—	MF	(Wales) WAL	Tony Wright
—	MF	(Montserrat) MSR	Wayne Dyer
—	MF	(England) ENG	Mickey Lewis
