= 2000–01 Oxford United F.C. season =

English football club season

Oxford United
2000–01 season
- Chairman: Firoz Kassam
- Manager: Denis Smith (until 2 October); Mike Ford (caretaker until 31 October); Dave Kemp (until 30 April); Mike Ford (caretaker until 8 May)
- Stadium: Manor Ground
- Football League Second Division: 24th
- FA Cup: Second round
- League Cup: First round
- League Trophy: First round

The 2000–01 season saw Oxford United compete in the Football League Second Division where they finished in 24th position with 27 points and were relegated to the Third Division. It was also Oxford's final season at the Manor Ground before moving to the Kassam Stadium.

== Season summary ==
Any hopes that this season might mark a turn-around after two seasons of struggle were dashed right out of the gate, with Denis Smith's second spell as manager being brought to an end in early October after the team could only win one and draw one of their first ten outings. Club veteran Mike Ford took charge for the next five matches, but could manage a return of only one point. At the end of the month, the club announced a new management structure headed up by director of football Joe Kinnear, with Dave Kemp installed as manager.

Unfortunately, the change failed to result in any real improvement in results, and Kinnear departed shortly after the turn of the year to take over as manager of relegation rivals Luton Town. Ultimately, the team's terrible defensive record (they kept only three clean sheets all season, two of which were the result of goalless draws) meant that survival never looked realistically on the cards, and they finished in bottom place, with just twenty-seven points (half of what they would have needed to survive) to their name, and a hundred goals conceded.

Though chairman Firoz Kassam had initially indicated that Kemp would be allowed to remain for the following season and attempt to rebuild the squad, fan protests and a dreadful 6–2 loss to fellow strugglers Bristol Rovers soon changed his mind, and Kemp was sacked with two games remaining; his last game in charge would ironically result in a 3–1 victory over second-bottom Swansea City. Ford stepped in as caretaker for the final two matches, before Kassam appointed Mark Wright as the manager to lead Oxford into their first fourth-tier campaign since 1965.

== Final league table ==
Pos	Team	Pld	W	D	L	GF	GA	GD	Pts	Qualification or relegation
20	Swindon Town	46	13	13	20	47	65	−18	52	
21	Bristol Rovers (R)	46	12	15	19	53	57	−4	51	Relegation to Football League Third Division
22	Luton Town (R)	46	9	13	24	52	80	−28	40	Relegation to Football League Third Division
23	Swansea City (R)	46	8	13	25	47	73	−26	37	Relegation to Football League Third Division
24	Oxford United (R)	46	7	6	33	53	100	−47	27	Relegation to Football League Third Division

Rules for classification: 1) Points; 2) Goal difference; 3) Goals scored
(R) Relegated

== Results ==
Oxford United's score comes first

=== Legend ===
Win	Draw	Loss

=== Football League Second Division ===
Match	Date	Opponent	Venue	Result	Attendance	Scorers
1	12 August 2000	Peterborough United	H	0–1	5,870	
2	19 August 2000	Port Vale	A	0–3	3,814	
3	26 August 2000	Brentford	H	0–1	4,756	
4	29 August 2000	Walsall	A	2–3	5,678	Beauchamp (2)
5	2 September 2000	Cambridge United	H	1–1	4,479	Jarman
6	8 September 2000	Wycombe Wanderers	A	1–3	5,831	Tait
7	13 September 2000	Stoke City	A	0–4	9,600	
8	16 September 2000	Bury	H	1–0	3,676	Cook
9	23 September 2000	Millwall	A	0–5	8,565	
10	30 September 2000	Bristol City	H	0–1	5,308	
11	8 October 2000	Swindon Town	A	1–2	7,975	Whittingham
12	14 October 2000	Wrexham	H	3–4	3,884	Tait, Beauchamp, McGregor (o.g.)
13	17 October 2000	Luton Town	H	0–0	4,537	
14	21 October 2000	Rotherham United	A	1–3	3,938	Lilley
15	24 October 2000	Wigan Athletic	H	0–2	4,030	
16	28 October 2000	Reading	A	3–4	16,022	Lilley, Viveash (o.g.), Richardson
17	4 November 2000	Bristol Rovers	H	0–1	5,407	
18	11 November 2000	Swansea City	A	2–1	4,892	Beauchamp, Andrews
19	25 November 2000	Notts County	H	2–3	4,765	Murphy (2)
20	2 December 2000	Oldham Athletic	A	2–3	3,986	Gray, Innes (o.g.)
21	16 December 2000	Northampton Town	H	3–1	4,899	Anthrobus, Murphy, Hackett
22	22 December 2000	Colchester United	A	2–3	3,695	Beauchamp, Gray
23	26 December 2000	Bournemouth	H	1–2	6,200	Fear
24	1 January 2001	Brentford	A	0–3	5,020	
25	13 January 2001	Walsall	H	2–1	5,184	Gray (2)
26	27 January 2001	Colchester United	H	0–1	5,064	
27	30 January 2001	Peterborough United	A	2–4	4,004	Fear, Murphy
28	10 February 2001	Wycombe Wanderers	H	1–2	5,384	Hackett
29	17 February 2001	Bury	A	1–3	3,320	Beauchamp
30	20 February 2001	Stoke City	H	1–1	4,856	Patterson
31	24 February 2001	Millwall	H	0–2	5,795	
32	3 March 2001	Bristol City	A	0–0	9,681	
33	6 March 2001	Wrexham	A	3–5	3,009	Gray, Powell, Murphy
34	10 March 2001	Swindon Town	H	0–2	7,480	
35	24 March 2001	Rotherham United	H	4–3	4,493	Quinn, Omoyinmi (2), Scott
36	27 March 2001	Cambridge United	A	0–1	3,502	
37	31 March 2001	Northampton Town	A	1–0	6,115	Tait
38	3 April 2001	Bournemouth	A	3–4	3,747	Quinn, Gray (2)
39	7 April 2001	Oldham Athletic	H	0–1	4,217	
40	10 April 2001	Luton Town	A	1–1	6,010	Scott
41	14 April 2001	Wigan Athletic	A	2–3	5,322	Scott, Beauchamp
42	17 April 2001	Reading	H	0–2	6,886	
43	21 April 2001	Bristol Rovers	A	2–6	7,554	Scott, Richardson
44	28 April 2001	Swansea City	H	3–1	4,148	Omoyinmi, Brooks, Murphy
45	1 May 2001	Port Vale	H	1–1	7,080	Scott
46	5 May 2001	Notts County	A	1–2	5,513	Folland

=== FA Cup ===
Match	Date	Opponent	Venue	Result	Attendance	Scorers
R1	18 November 2000	Macclesfield Town	A	1–0	2,141	Gray
R2	9 December 2000	Chester City	A	2–3	2,798	Gray, Murphy

=== Football League Cup ===
Match	Date	Opponent	Venue	Result	Attendance	Scorers
R1 1st leg	22 August 2000	Wolverhampton Wanderers	A	1–0	9,399	Murphy
R1 2nd leg	5 September 2000	Wolverhampton Wanderers	H	1–3	4,676	Shepheard

=== Football League Trophy ===
Match	Date	Opponent	Venue	Result	Attendance	Scorers
R1	5 December 2000	Brentford	A	1–4	1,517	Anthrobus

== Squad statistics ==
No.	Pos.	Name	League		FA Cup		League Cup		Other		Total	
No.	Pos.	Name	Apps	Goals	Apps	Goals	Apps	Goals	Apps	Goals	Apps	Goals
1	GK	(England) Richard Knight	33	0	2	0	2	0	0	0	37	0
2	DF	(Scotland) John Robertson	37(3)	0	1	0	2	0	1	0	41(3)	0
3	DF	(England) Paul Powell	15(5)	1	0	0	1	0	0	0	16(5)	1
4	MF	(England) Peter Fear	14(6)	2	2	0	0	0	0	0	16(6)	2
5	DF	(England) Jon Richardson	41	2	2	0	2	0	1	0	46	2
6	DF	(England) Ian McGuckin	6(1)	0	0	0	0	0	0	0	6(1)	0
7	MF	(England) Matt Murphy	37(3)	6	2	1	1(1)	1	1	0	41(4)	8
8	MF	(England) Paul Tait	22(4)	3	0	0	2	0	0	0	24(4)	3
9	FW	(England) Steve Anthrobus	13(6)	1	1	0	2	0	0(1)	1	16(7)	2
10	FW	(England) Andy Scott	0	0	0	0	0	0	0	0	0	0
10	FW	(Scotland) Derek Lilley	15(4)	0	1	0	0(2)	0	0	0	16(6)	0
11	MF	(England) Joey Beauchamp	32(11)	7	2	0	1(1)	0	1	0	36(12)	7
12	FW	(England) Jamie Cook	4(5)	1	0	0	0	0	0	0	4(5)	1
13	GK	(Jamaica) Hubert Busby	0(1)	0	0	0	0	0	0	0	0(1)	0
13	GK	(England) Neil Cutler	11	0	0	0	0	0	0	0	11	0
14	FW	(Nigeria) Emmanuel Omoyinmi	16(8)	3	0(1)	0	2	0	1	0	19(9)	3
15	MF	(England) Simon Weatherstone	6(1)	0	0	0	0	0	0	0	6(1)	0
16	MF	(Wales) Rob Folland	1(4)	1	0	0	0(2)	0	0	0	1(6)	1
17	DF	(England) Jon Shepheard	0	0	0	0	0	0	0	0	0	0
18	DF	(England) Chris Hackett	10(6)	2	1	0	0	0	0(1)	0	11(6)	2
19	DF	(Wales) Lee Jarman	15(6)	1	2	0	2	0	0	0	19(6)	1
20	GK	(England) Phil Wilson	1(1)	0	0	0	0	0	0	0	1(1)	0
21	MF	(England) Jordan Holder	0(2)	0	0	0	0	0	0	0	0(2)	0
21	DF	(Scotland) Neil McGowan	11	0	0	0	1	0	0	0	12	0
22	DF	(England) Wayne Hatswell	26(1)	0	0	0	0	0	1	0	27(1)	0
22	DF	(England) Mickey Lewis	0	0	0	0	0	0	0	0	0	0
23	DF	(England) Ross Weatherstone	1	0	0	0	0	0	0	0	1	0
24	GK	(England) Jimmy Glass	1	0	0	0	0	0	1	0	2	0
24	FW	(England) Guy Whittingham	1	1	0	0	0	0	0	0	1	1
25	FW	(Northern Ireland) Phil Gray	21(2)	7	2	2	0	0	1	0	24(2)	9
25	FW	(England) Ben Abbey	0	0	0	0	0	0	0	0	0	0
26	DF	(England) Simon King	2	0	0	0	0	0	0	0	2	0
27	MF	(England) Dean Whitehead	16(4)	0	0(1)	0	2	0	0	0	18(5)	0
28	DF	(Wales) Sam Ricketts	13(1)	0	0	0	0	0	1	0	14(1)	0
29	FW	(England) Leon Mike	1(2)	0	0	0	0	0	0	0	1(2)	0
29	MF	(Republic of Ireland) Keith Andrews	4	1	0	0	0	0	1	0	5	1
30	DF	(England) Mike Ford	1	0	0	0	0	0	0	0	1	0
31	FW	(England) Jamie Brooks	3(1)	1	0	0	0	0	0	0	3(1)	1
32	FW	(England) Leon Mike	0	0	0	0	0	0	0	0	0	0
32	DF	(England) Garry Monk	5	0	0	0	0	0	0	0	5	0
33	DF	(England) Andy Linighan	12(1)	0	2	0	0	0	0	0	14(1)	0
34	MF	(Republic of Ireland) Rob Quinn	12(1)	2	0	0	0	0	0	0	12(1)	2
34	DF	(Scotland) Keith Brown	3	0	2	0	0	0	1	0	6	0
35	DF	(Northern Ireland) Darren Patterson	18	1	0	0	0	0	0	0	18	1
