= 1997–98 Football League First Division =

First Division
- Season: 1997–98
- Champions: Nottingham Forest
- Promoted: Nottingham Forest; Middlesbrough; Charlton Athletic
- Relegated: Manchester City; Stoke City; Reading
- Matches: 552
- Goals: 1,410 (2.55 per match)
- Top goalscorer: Kevin Phillips; Pierre van Hooijdonk (29 goals each)
- Biggest home win: Middlesbrough 6–0 Swindon Town (11 March 1998)
- Biggest away win: Stoke City 0–7 Birmingham City (10 January 1998)
- Highest scoring: Nottingham Forest 5–2 Charlton Athletic (22 November 1997); Stoke City 0–7 Birmingham City (10 January 1998); Ipswich Town 5–2 Oxford United (24 February 1998); Stoke City 2–5 Manchester City (3 May 1998)

The 1997–98 Football League First Division (referred to as the Nationwide First Division for sponsorship reasons) was the sixth season of the league under its current league division format.

== Changes from previous season ==
=== Team changes ===
==== From First Division ====
Promoted to Premier League

- Barnsley
- Bolton Wanderers
- Crystal Palace

Relegated to Second Division

- Grimsby Town
- Oldham Athletic
- Southend United

=== To First Division ===
Promoted from Second Division

- Bury
- Crewe Alexandra
- Stockport County

Relegated from Premier League

- Middlesbrough
- Nottingham Forest
- Sunderland

== Teams ==
=== Stadium and locations ===
Locations of the Football League First Division 1997–1998 teams

Team	Location	Stadium	Capacity
Birmingham City	Birmingham	St Andrew's	25,877
Bradford City	Bradford	Valley Parade	17,848
Bury	Bury	Gigg Lane	11,840
Charlton Athletic	Charlton	The Valley	15,815
Crewe Alexandra	Crewe	Gresty Road	10,153
Huddersfield Town	Huddersfield	Alfred McAlpine Stadium	24,500
Ipswich Town	Ipswich	Portman Road	30,311
Manchester City	Manchester	Maine Road	35,150
Middlesbrough	Middlesbrough	Riverside Stadium	30,000
Norwich City	Norwich	Carrow Road	24,663
Nottingham Forest	West Bridgford	City Ground	30,576
Oxford United	Oxford	Manor Ground	9,500
Port Vale	Burslem	Vale Park	19,052
Portsmouth	Portsmouth	Fratton Park	21,100
Queens Park Rangers	White City	Loftus Road	18,439
Reading	Reading	Elm Park	14,800
Sheffield United	Sheffield	Bramall Lane	29,034
Stockport County	Stockport	Edgeley Park	10,841
Stoke City	Stoke-on-Trent	Britannia Stadium	27,743
Sunderland	Sunderland	Stadium of Light	42,000
Swindon Town	Swindon	County Ground	15,728
Tranmere Rovers	Birkenhead	Prenton Park	16,567
West Bromwich Albion	West Bromwich	The Hawthorns	22,986
Wolverhampton Wanderers	Wolverhampton	Molineux Stadium	28,525

=== Personnel and kits ===
Team	Manager	Captain	Kit manufacturer	Shirt sponsor
Birmingham City	(England) Trevor Francis	(England) Steve Bruce	Pony	Auto Windscreens
Bradford City	(England) Paul Jewell	(England) Wayne Jacobs	Beaver	JCT600
Bury	(England) Stan Ternent	(England) Chris Lucketti	Super League	Birthdays
Charlton Athletic	(England) Alan Curbishley	(Republic of Ireland) Mark Kinsella	Quaser	Viglen
Crewe Alexandra	(England) Dario Gradi	(England) Gareth Whalley	Adidas	Boldon James
Huddersfield Town	(England) Peter Jackson	(Wales) Barry Horne	Pony	Panasonic
Ipswich Town	(Scotland) George Burley	(England) Jason Cundy	Punch	Greene King
Manchester City	(England) Joe Royle	(Wales) Kit Symons	Kappa	Brother
Middlesbrough	(England) Bryan Robson	(England) Nigel Pearson	Erreà	Cellnet
Norwich City	(England) John Faulkner (caretaker)	(England) Matt Jackson	Pony	Colman's
Nottingham Forest	(England) Dave Bassett	(England) Steve Chettle	Umbro	Pinnacle
Oxford United	(England) Malcolm Shotton	(England) Phil Gilchrist	Own Brand	Unipart
Port Vale	(England) John Rudge	(England) Allen Tankard	Mizuno	Tunstall Assurance
Portsmouth	(England) Alan Ball	(England) Adrian Whitbread	Admiral	KJC
Queens Park Rangers	(England) Ray Harford	(Northern Ireland) Steve Morrow	Le Coq Sportif	Ericsson
Reading	(Scotland) Tommy Burns	(England) Phil Parkinson	Mizuno	Auto Trader
Sheffield United	(England) Steve Thompson (caretaker)	(England) David Holdsworth	Le Coq Sportif	Wards
Stockport County	(England) Gary Megson	(England) Mike Flynn	Adidas	Robinsons
Stoke City	(Wales) Alan Durban (caretaker)	(Iceland) Lárus Sigurðsson	Asics	Britannia
Sunderland	(England) Peter Reid	(England) Kevin Ball	Asics	Lambtons
Swindon Town	(England) Steve McMahon	(England) Brian Borrows	Mizuno	Nationwide
Tranmere Rovers	(Republic of Ireland) John Aldridge	(Republic of Ireland) Liam O'Brien	Mizuno	Wirral
West Bromwich Albion	(England) Denis Smith	(England) Sean Flynn	Patrick	West Bromwich Building Society
Wolverhampton Wanderers	(Scotland) Mark McGhee	(England) Keith Curle	Puma	Goodyear

=== Managerial changes ===
Team	Outgoing manager	Manner of departure	Date of vacancy	Position in table	Incoming manager	Date of appointment
Huddersfield Town	(England) Brian Horton	Sacked	6 October 1997	24th	(England) Peter Jackson	7 October 1997
Queens Park Rangers	(Scotland) Stewart Houston	Sacked	10 November 1997	13th	(England) Ray Harford	5 December 1997
West Bromwich Albion	(England) Ray Harford	Resigned	4 December 1997	4th	(England) Denis Smith	24 December 1997
Oxford United	(England) Denis Smith	Signed by West Bromwich Albion	24 December 1997	16th	(England) Malcolm Shotton	24 January 1998
Bradford City	(England) Chris Kamara	Sacked	6 January 1998	11th	(England) Paul Jewell	6 January 1998
Portsmouth	(England) Terry Fenwick	Sacked	14 January 1998	24th	(England) Alan Ball	26 January 1998
Stoke City	(England) Chic Bates	Mutual consent	22 January 1998	20th	(England) Chris Kamara	22 January 1998
Manchester City	(England) Frank Clark	Sacked	17 February 1998	22nd	(England) Joe Royle	18 February 1998
Sheffield United	(England) Nigel Spackman	Resigned	2 March 1998	5th	(England) Steve Bruce	2 July 1998
Reading	(England) Terry Bullivant	Resigned	18 March 1998	23rd	(Scotland) Tommy Burns	25 March 1998
Stoke City	(England) Chris Kamara	Mutual consent	8 April 1998	24th	(England) Brian Little	13 May 1998
Norwich City	(Wales) Mike Walker	Resigned	30 April 1998	16th	(Scotland) Bruce Rioch	12 June 1998

== League table ==
Pos	Team	Pld	W	D	L	GF	GA	GD	Pts	Qualification or relegation
1	Nottingham Forest (C, P)	46	28	10	8	82	42	+40	94	Promotion to the Premier League
2	Middlesbrough (P)	46	27	10	9	77	41	+36	91	Promotion to the Premier League
3	Sunderland	46	26	12	8	86	50	+36	90	Qualification for the First Division play-offs
4	Charlton Athletic (O, P)	46	26	10	10	80	49	+31	88	Qualification for the First Division play-offs
5	Ipswich Town	46	23	14	9	77	43	+34	83	Qualification for the First Division play-offs
6	Sheffield United	46	19	17	10	69	54	+15	74	Qualification for the First Division play-offs
7	Birmingham City	46	19	17	10	60	35	+25	74	
8	Stockport County	46	19	8	19	71	69	+2	65	
9	Wolverhampton Wanderers	46	18	11	17	57	53	+4	65	
10	West Bromwich Albion	46	16	13	17	50	56	−6	61	
11	Crewe Alexandra	46	18	5	23	58	65	−7	59	
12	Oxford United	46	16	10	20	60	64	−4	58	
13	Bradford City	46	14	15	17	46	59	−13	57	
14	Tranmere Rovers	46	14	14	18	54	57	−3	56	
15	Norwich City	46	14	13	19	52	69	−17	55	
16	Huddersfield Town	46	14	11	21	50	72	−22	53	
17	Bury	46	11	19	16	42	58	−16	52	
18	Swindon Town	46	14	10	22	42	73	−31	52	
19	Port Vale	46	13	10	23	56	66	−10	49	
20	Portsmouth	46	13	10	23	51	63	−12	49	
21	Queens Park Rangers	46	10	19	17	51	63	−12	49	
22	Manchester City (R)	46	12	12	22	56	57	−1	48	Relegation to the Second Division
23	Stoke City (R)	46	11	13	22	44	74	−30	46	Relegation to the Second Division
24	Reading (R)	46	11	9	26	39	78	−39	42	Relegation to the Second Division

Source: Statto.com
Rules for classification: 1) Points; 2) Goals scored; 3) Goal difference
(C) Champions; (O) Play-off winners; (P) Promoted; (R) Relegated

== Play-offs ==
Semi-finals; First leg – 10 May; Second leg – 13 May 1998
3rd	Sunderland	1	2	3
6th	Sheffield United	2	0	2
4th	Charlton Athletic	1	1	2
5th	Ipswich Town	0	0	0

Final at Wembley; 25 May 1998
3rd	Sunderland	4 (6)
4th	Charlton Athletic (pen.)	4 (7)

== Results ==
Home \ Away	BIR	BRA	BRY	CHA	CRE	HUD	IPS	MCI	MID	NWC	NOT	OXF	PTV	POR	QPR	REA	SHU	STP	STK	SUN	SWI	TRA	WBA	WOL
Birmingham City		0–0	1–3	0–0	0–1	0–0	1–1	2–1	1–1	1–2	1–2	0–0	1–1	2–1	1–0	3–0	2–0	4–1	2–0	0–1	3–0	0–0	1–0	1–0
Bradford City	0–0		1–0	1–0	1–0	1–1	2–1	2–1	2–2	2–1	0–3	0–0	2–1	1–3	1–1	4–1	1–1	2–1	0–0	0–4	1–1	0–1	0–0	2–0
Bury	2–1	2–0		0–0	1–1	2–2	0–1	1–1	0–1	1–0	2–0	1–0	2–2	0–2	1–1	1–1	1–1	0–1	0–0	1–1	1–0	1–0	1–3	1–3
Charlton Athletic	1–1	4–1	0–0		3–2	1–0	3–0	2–1	3–0	2–1	4–2	3–2	1–0	1–0	1–1	3–0	2–1	1–3	1–1	1–1	3–0	2–0	5–0	1–0
Crewe Alexandra	0–2	5–0	1–2	0–3		2–5	0–0	1–0	1–1	1–0	1–4	2–1	0–1	3–1	2–3	1–0	2–1	0–1	2–0	0–3	2–0	2–1	2–3	0–2
Huddersfield Town	0–1	1–2	2–0	0–3	2–0		2–2	1–3	0–1	1–3	0–2	5–1	0–4	1–1	1–1	1–0	0–0	1–0	3–1	2–3	0–0	3–0	1–0	1–0
Ipswich Town	0–1	2–1	2–0	3–1	3–2	5–1		1–0	1–1	5–0	0–1	5–2	5–1	2–0	0–0	1–0	2–2	0–2	2–3	2–0	2–1	0–0	1–1	3–0
Manchester City	0–1	1–0	0–1	2–2	1–0	0–1	1–2		2–0	1–2	2–3	0–2	2–3	2–2	2–2	0–0	0–0	4–1	0–1	0–1	6–0	1–1	1–0	0–1
Middlesbrough	3–1	1–0	4–0	2–1	1–0	3–0	1–1	1–0		3–0	0–0	4–1	2–1	1–1	3–0	4–0	1–2	3–1	0–1	3–1	6–0	3–0	1–0	1–1
Norwich City	3–3	2–3	2–2	0–4	0–2	5–0	2–1	0–0	1–3		1–0	2–1	1–0	2–0	0–0	0–0	2–1	1–1	0–0	2–1	5–0	0–2	1–1	0–2
Nottingham Forest	1–0	2–2	3–0	5–2	3–1	3–0	2–1	1–3	4–0	2–3		1–3	2–1	1–0	4–0	1–0	3–0	2–1	1–0	0–3	3–0	2–2	1–0	3–0
Oxford United	0–2	0–0	1–1	1–2	0–0	2–0	1–0	0–0	1–4	2–0	0–1		2–0	1–0	3–1	3–0	2–4	3–0	5–1	1–1	2–1	1–1	2–1	3–0
Port Vale	0–1	0–0	1–1	0–1	2–3	4–1	1–3	2–1	0–1	2–2	0–1	3–0		2–1	2–0	0–0	0–0	2–1	0–0	3–1	0–1	0–1	1–2	0–2
Portsmouth	1–1	1–1	1–1	0–2	2–3	3–0	0–1	0–3	0–0	1–1	0–1	2–1	3–1		3–1	0–2	1–1	1–0	2–0	1–4	0–1	1–0	2–3	3–2
Queens Park Rangers	1–1	1–0	0–1	2–4	3–2	2–1	0–0	2–0	5–0	1–1	0–1	1–1	0–1	1–0		1–1	2–2	2–1	1–1	0–1	1–2	0–0	2–0	0–0
Reading	2–0	0–3	1–1	2–0	3–3	0–2	0–4	3–0	0–1	0–1	3–3	2–1	0–3	0–1	1–2		0–1	1–0	2–0	4–0	0–1	1–3	2–1	0–0
Sheffield United	0–0	2–1	3–0	4–1	1–0	1–1	0–1	1–1	1–0	2–2	1–0	1–0	2–1	2–1	2–2	4–0		5–1	3–2	2–0	2–1	2–1	2–4	1–0
Stockport County	2–2	1–2	0–0	3–0	0–1	3–0	0–1	3–1	1–1	2–2	2–2	3–2	3–0	3–1	2–0	5–1	1–0		1–0	1–1	4–2	3–1	2–1	1–0
Stoke City	0–7	2–1	3–2	1–2	0–2	1–2	1–1	2–5	1–2	2–0	1–1	0–0	2–1	2–1	2–1	1–2	2–2	2–1		1–2	1–2	0–3	0–0	3–0
Sunderland	1–1	2–0	2–1	0–0	2–1	3–1	2–2	3–1	1–2	0–1	1–1	3–1	4–2	2–1	2–2	4–1	4–2	4–1	3–0		0–0	3–0	2–0	1–1
Swindon Town	1–1	1–0	3–1	0–1	2–0	1–1	0–2	1–3	1–2	1–0	0–0	4–1	4–2	0–1	3–1	0–2	1–1	1–1	1–0	1–2		2–1	0–2	0–0
Tranmere Rovers	0–3	3–1	0–0	2–2	0–3	1–0	1–1	0–0	0–2	2–0	0–0	0–2	1–2	2–2	2–1	6–0	3–3	3–0	3–1	0–2	3–0		0–0	2–1
West Bromwich Albion	1–0	1–1	1–1	1–0	0–1	0–2	2–3	0–1	2–1	1–0	1–1	1–2	2–2	0–3	1–1	1–0	2–0	3–2	1–1	3–3	0–0	2–1		1–0
Wolverhampton Wanderers	1–3	2–1	4–2	3–1	1–0	1–1	1–1	2–2	1–0	5–0	2–1	1–0	1–1	2–0	3–2	3–1	0–0	3–4	1–1	0–1	3–1	2–1	0–1	

Legend: Blue = home team win; Yellow = draw; Red = away team win.

== Season statistics ==
=== Top scorers ===
Rank	Player	Club	Goals
1	(England) Kevin Phillips	Sunderland	29
1	(Netherlands) Pierre van Hooijdonk	Nottingham Forest	29
3	(England) Kevin Campbell	Nottingham Forest	23
3	(England) Clive Mendonca	Charlton Athletic	23
5	(England) David Johnson	Ipswich Town	20
6	(England) Brett Angell	Stockport County	18
7	(England) Paul Furlong	Birmingham City	15
7	(England) Marcus Stewart	Huddersfield Town	15

=== Hat-tricks ===
Player	For	Against	Result	Date
(Netherlands) Pierre van Hooijdonk	Nottingham Forest	Queens Park Rangers	4–0	30 August 1997
(Netherlands) Pierre van Hooijdonk	Nottingham Forest	Charlton Athletic	5–2	22 November 1997
(England) Kevin Campbell	Nottingham Forest	Crewe Alexandra	4–1	7 March 1998
(England) Clive Mendonca	Charlton Athletic	Norwich City	4–0	17 September 1997
(Norway) Jan Åge Fjørtoft	Sheffield United	Stockport County	5–1	21 October 1997
(England) Paul Furlong	Birmingham City	Stoke City	7–0	10 January 1998
(England) Paul Furlong	Birmingham City	Stockport County	4–1	27 January 1998
(Scotland) Dougie Freedman	Wolverhampton Wanderers	Norwich City	5–0	10 January 1998
(Scotland) Alex Mathie	Ipswich Town	Norwich City	5–0	21 February 1998
(England) David Johnson	Ipswich Town	Oxford United	5–2	24 February 1998
(Republic of Ireland) Niall Quinn	Sunderland	Stockport County	4–1	7 March 1998
(Italy) Marco Branca	Middlesbrough	Bury	4–0	11 April 1998
(England) Colin Little	Crewe Alexandra	Bradford City	5–0	25 April 1998
