= Shepheard =

Shepheard may refer to:

- Carole Shepheard (born 1945), New Zealand artist
- John Shepheard (born 1981), British footballer
- Peter Shepheard (1913–2002), British architect and landscape architect
- Ryan Shepheard (born 1977), Australian soccer referee
- Samuel Shepheard (died 1719), British Member of Parliament for Newport (Isle of Wight) and the City of London (father of Samuel Shepheard)
- Samuel Shepheard (1677–1748), British Member of Parliament for Malmesbury, Cambridge and Cambridgeshire
