= Dean Whitehead =

English footballer (born 1982)

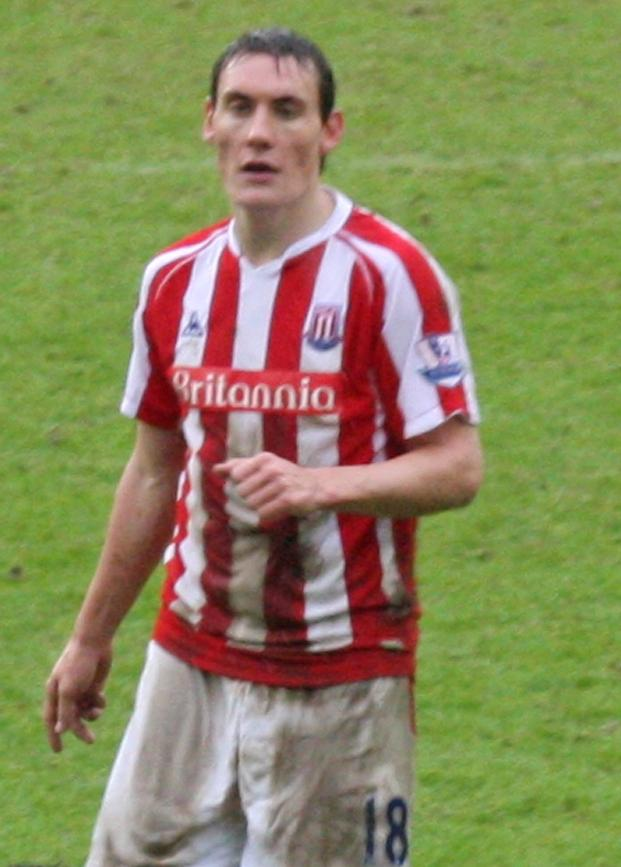
- Whitehead playing for Stoke City in 2010

Personal information
- Full name: Dean Whitehead
- Date of birth: 12 January 1982 (age 44)
- Place of birth: Abingdon, Oxfordshire, England
- Height: 5 ft 11 in (1.80 m)
- Positions: Central midfielder; right-back

Youth career
- Abingdon Town
- –1999: Oxford United

Senior career*
Years	Team	Apps	(Gls)
1999–2004	Oxford United	122	(9)
2004–2009	Sunderland	185	(13)
2009–2013	Stoke City	132	(3)
2013–2015	Middlesbrough	55	(1)
2015–2018	Huddersfield Town	54	(0)
Total		548	(26)

Managerial career
- 2023: Cardiff City (caretaker)
- * Club domestic league appearances and goals

Dean Whitehead (born 12 January 1982) is an English football coach and former professional footballer who is the assistant manager of EFL League Two club Tranmere Rovers. A midfielder who occasionally played as a right-back, he made 622 league and cup appearances in a 19-year playing career, scoring 29 goals.

Whitehead joined his local non-League club Abingdon Town before he signed for Football League club Oxford United in 1999. He played for Oxford in the Second Division until their relegation into the Third Division in 2001. He was signed by Championship club Sunderland in 2004. He won promotion in his first season with Sunderland, although they were relegated from the Premier League after one season. He was made captain by Roy Keane as Sunderland claimed an instant return to the top flight. After two more seasons in the north-east, Whitehead signed for Stoke City in 2009. He helped Stoke reach the 2011 FA Cup final, where the team finished runners-up to Manchester City. After spending four seasons with Stoke, Whitehead signed for Middlesbrough in 2013. He moved to Huddersfield Town two years later, helping them to get promoted from the Championship in 2017 before retiring in 2018.

He has coached at Huddersfield Town, Shrewsbury Town, Port Vale, Beşiktaş (Turkey), Cardiff City, Watford, Barnsley, Stoke City, Blackburn Rovers, and Tranmere Rovers.

== Playing career ==
=== Oxford United ===
Born in Abingdon, Oxfordshire, Whitehead started his career with Abingdon Town's youth team, before joining the youth scheme of his local professional Football League club, Oxford United as an apprentice.

He progressed through the ranks, making his first-team debut in a 2–0 win over Luton Town in the Football League Trophy on 7 December 1999. This turned out to be Whitehead's only appearance of the 1999–00 season, as he spent the rest of the season on the substitute bench. At the end of the 1999–00 season, he signed a contract with the club.

In the 2000–01 season, Whitehead soon received a handful of first-team appearances for the club by manager Denis Smith. Although he received his first-team opportunities, he found himself in a competition with Matt Murphy and other midfielders for the central role. Despite being sidelined on two occasions, due to suspensions, Whitehead played in 23 matches in 2000–01 season, as Oxford suffered relegation to the Third Division. At the end of the 2000–01 season, he signed a long–term contract with the club.

In the 2001–02 season, Whitehead scored his first goal in the Football League against Rushden & Diamonds on 31 August 2001. He was soon a first-team regular in 2001–02 season, establishing himself in the midfield position. However, halfway through the season, Whitehead, along with Chris Hackett were subjected to criticism by manager Ian Atkins for unprofessionalism over refusing to do the club's fitness programme, which were denied by the pair, who stated the whole thing was a misunderstanding. Towards the end of the 2001–02 season, he began playing in a central midfield role. Despite missing out three matches, he played in 43 fixtures as Oxford United had a poor season, finishing in 21st position.

Whitehead began the 2002–03 season as a first-team regular in good form. At the beginning of November, Whitehead's performances against Aston Villa and Rochdale were praised by Atkins. He continued with his impressive displays to the end of the year. Whitehead later scored his first goal of the season on 26 December, in a 3–0 win over AFC Bournemouth. However, he found his first-team chances limited between January and March. As a result, he was restricted to 22 appearances in 2002–03 as Oxford missed out on a play-off place by a single point.

In 2003–04 season, Whitehead reclaimed his place in the team following the departure of Dave Savage. On 27 September 2003, he scored his first goal of the season, in a 3–0 win over Northampton Town. He was praised for his performances in his run of first-team football. Whitehead scored his first brace of the season on 18 October, in a 4–0 win over Bury. He also scored a free kick on 1 November, helping his team to make a 3–1 comeback win over Darlington. As a result, he was offered a two–year contract by the club, which would keep him at the Kassam Stadium until 2006. On 21 February 2004, he scored against Bury for the second time that season, in a 1–1 draw. In a 2–1 loss against Macclesfield Town on 1 May, Whitehead captained the side for the first time, in the absence of Andy Crosby. By the end of the 2003–04 season, he made 47 appearances and scoring seven goals. Whitehead was named the club's Player of the Season.

After playing for the club for five seasons, his contract expired and he turned down the offer of a new one from the club. Manager Graham Rix revealed that Whitehead would have been appointed as Crosby's successor as captain if he signed a new contract with the club.

=== Sunderland ===
In June 2004, Whitehead signed for Championship club Sunderland on a free transfer. Upon signing a three–year contract with the club, he revealed that his ambition and desire to play at a higher level was why he joined Sunderland. Sunderland were ordered to pay £150,000 to Oxford at an FA tribunal, to compensate for the time and money put into his development. Oxford would also receive 25% of any fee should Sunderland sell Whitehead.

Whitehead made his Sunderland debut, coming on as a late substitute for Ben Clark, in a 2–0 loss against Coventry City in the opening game of the season. He quickly became a key member of the team, playing regularly despite facing competition from other midfielders. His run in the first-team saw him praised by manager Mick McCarthy. On 25 October 2004, he scored his first goal for the club, in a 1–0 win over Rotherham United. He then scored his second goal of the season on 11 December, in a 2–0 win over Cardiff City. Whitehead scored three more goals later in the season in games that ended up as Sunderland victories. Following his good performance at Sunderland halfway through the season, he was given a new three-year contract during 2004–05. Despite missing out three matches during the season, as he went on to make forty–three appearances and scoring five times in all competitions. He helped Sunderland to win the Championship in 2004–05, and was chosen as Players' Player of the Year by his teammates at the end of the season.

In the 2005–06, Whitehead continued to establish himself in the starting eleven, with the club playing in the Premier League. Despite the club's struggles in the Premier League at the start of the season, he made a positive impact for the side. His performances earned him comparison to Manchester United's Roy Keane. On 29 October 2005, he scored his first Premier League goal, in a 4–1 loss against Portsmouth. Three weeks later, on 19 November, Whitehead scored his second goal of the season, in a 3–1 loss against Aston Villa. By November, he began playing in the right-wing position, a more unfamiliar role. On 26 November, Whitehead signed a contract extension with the club, keeping him at the Stadium of Light until 2010. He scored a swerving 30 yards (27 m) free kick past then-England goalkeeper Paul Robinson in a 3–2 defeat against Tottenham Hotspur at White Hart Lane on 3 December. Sunderland were eventually relegated to the Championship for the 2006–07 season. Despite missing out one match during the 2005–06 season, Whitehead went on to make thirty–eight appearances and scored three goals in all competitions.

Ahead of the 2006–07 season, Reading had a bid of £1.2 million for Whitehead rejected in July 2006. The following month, Whitehead and teammate Liam Lawrence both signed new contracts. He continued to establish himself in the first-team, under the management of newly appointed manager Roy Keane. Whitehead then scored his first goal of the season against West Bromwich Albion, in a 2–0 win during which he was named as man of the match. Then, on 21 October, he scored his second goal of the season, in a 2–0 win against Barnsley. During the 2006–07 season, Whitehead resigned the captaincy to concentrate on his football but he deputised for the frequently injured Steven Caldwell and was reappointed as captain on a permanent basis after Caldwell was sold to Burnley. At one point during the 2006–07 season, Whitehead played in a right–back position following the absence of Nyron Nosworthy. The following month, he reverted to his central midfield position. Towards the end of the season, Whitehead scored two more goals. Sunderland finished first in the Championship in 2006–07, thus making an instant return to the Premier League. At the end of the 2006–07 season, Whitehead was included in the PFA Team of the Year. He also came second in the club's Player of the Year vote. Despite being sidelined during the 2006–07 season, Whitehead went on to make forty–seven appearances and scoring four times in all competitions.

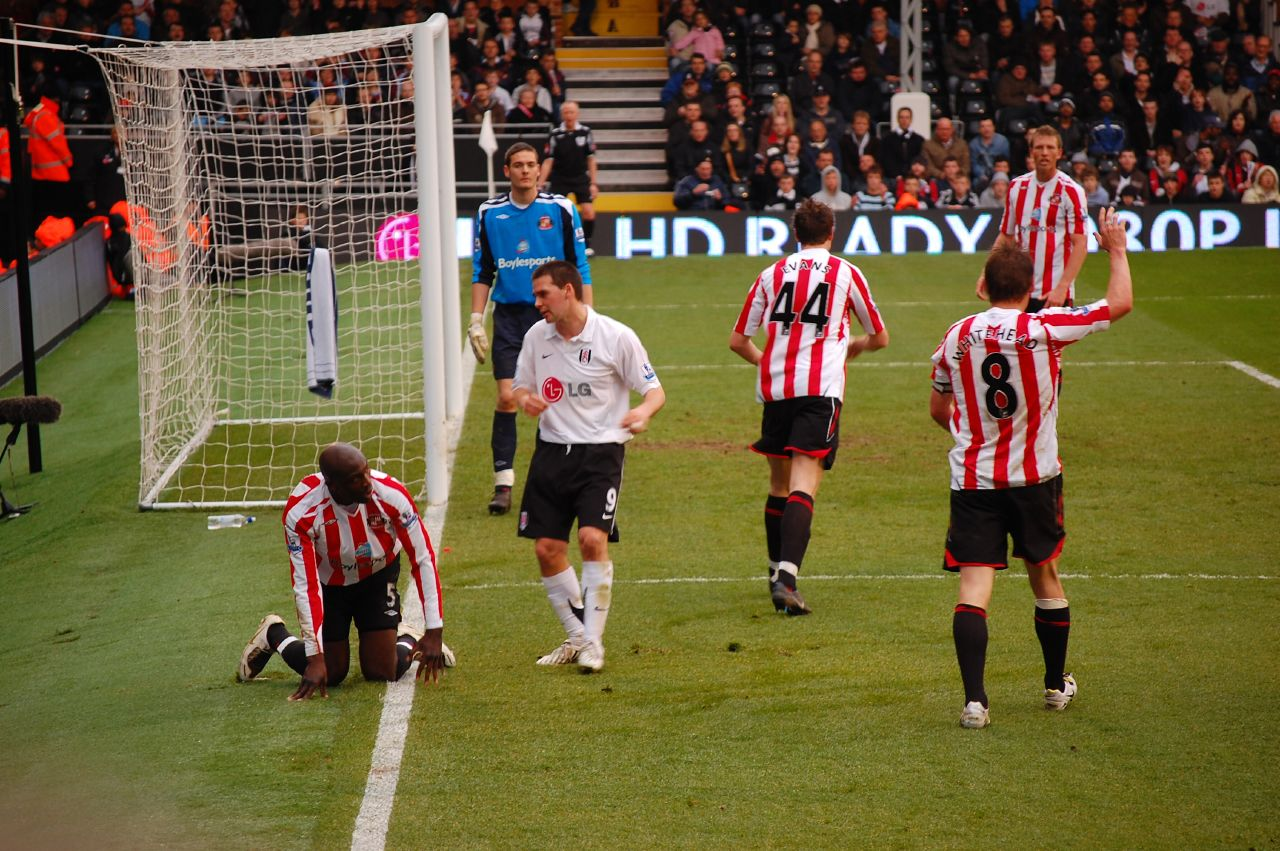
Whitehead (in red, wearing a number 8 shirt) playing against Fulham in April 2008.

In the 2007–08 season, Whitehead played in the right–back position against Tottenham Hotspur in the opening game of the season before sustaining a cruciate knee ligament injury in a match against Wigan Athletic in August, which ruled him out for six months. He made his comeback from injury in early–November 2007 and made his first-team return on 24 November, playing every minute of a 7–1 loss against Everton. Since returning from injury, he regained his first-team place for Sunderland. He then scored his first goal of the season, in a 2–1 loss against Manchester City on 14 April. At the end of the 2007–08 season, Whitehead helped Sunderland to avoid relegation by three points. Despite being sidelined during the season, Whitehead went on to make twenty–eight appearances and scoring once in all competitions. During parts of the season, Whitehead played at right-back, although this ended when Whitehead moved back into central midfield.

Ahead of the 2008–09 season, Whitehead was linked to a move away from Sunderland, as newly-promotion Premier League side Stoke City made a £3 million bid on him. In response, he stated that he wanted to stay at Sunderland. At the start of the season, Whitehead continued to remain in the starting line-up for the side. After a 4–1 loss against Bolton Wanderers on 29 November, he was heavily booed by the club's supporters for the performance throughout the match, in what transpired to be Keane's last match as Sunderland manager. Whitehead continued to be linked away from Sunderland throughout the January transfer window. Despite missing out four matches during the season, Whitehead helped the side avoid relegation once again after losing 3–2 to Chelsea in the last game of the season as defeats for Newcastle and Middlesbrough meant Sunderland were safe. By the end of the 2008–09 season, Whitehead went on to make thirty–eight appearances in all competitions. He left Sunderland in August 2009 after making 200 appearances for the club.

=== Stoke City ===
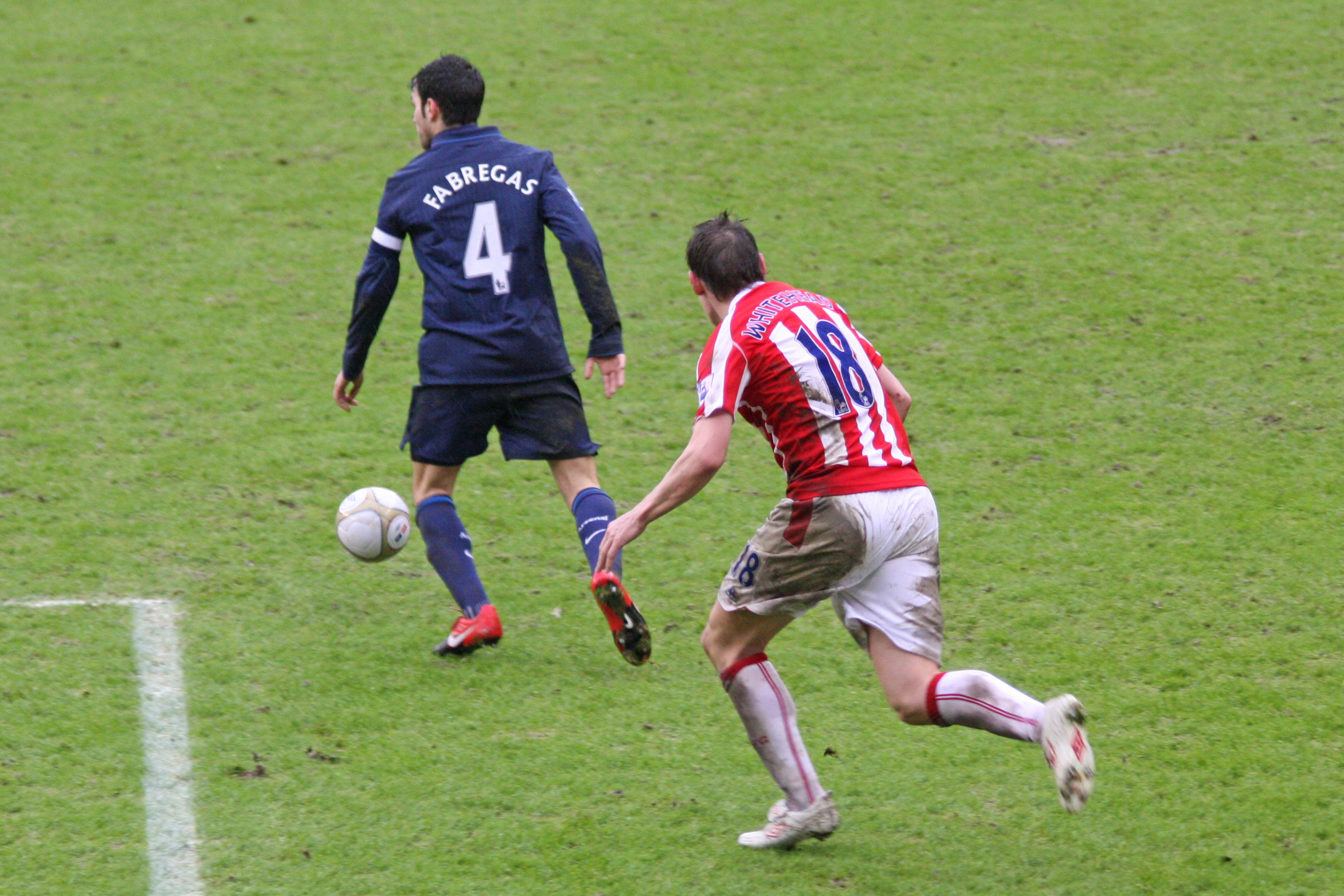
Whitehead (wearing a number 18 shirt) about to chase a ball from Arsenal's Cesc Fàbregas (wearing a number 4 shirt) during a FA Cup match in January 2010.

Whitehead signed a four-year contract with Premier League club Stoke City on 24 July 2009 for an initial £3 million fee, rising to £5 million with add-ons. He stated that Stoke's team spirit was the main reason for his move to the club. He made his debut on 15 August 2009 in a 2–0 win over Burnley. Whitehead made a slow start to his Stoke career with a number of anonymous performances. However, following a 0–0 draw with Blackburn Rovers, he earned praise from manager Tony Pulis. Whitehead scored his first goal for Stoke when he converted winger Matthew Etherington's cross in the 86th-minute in a 3–1 FA Cup fourth-round win over Arsenal at the Britannia Stadium on 24 January 2010. Whitehead was sent off against Tottenham Hotspur in March 2010 in a decision which drew referee Mike Dean heavy criticism from Tony Pulis and Matthew Etherington.

His first Premier League goal for Stoke came against Birmingham City on 9 November 2010, with Whitehead scoring the winning goal in a 3–2 victory. He scored his second league goal for Stoke away to Manchester United on 4 January 2011, becoming the first Stoke player to score at Old Trafford since 1980. Towards the end of 2010–11, Whitehead lost his place in the starting eleven to a resurging Glenn Whelan, making some cameo appearances from the bench. One of these came at Wembley Stadium in the 2011 FA Cup final defeat to Manchester City.

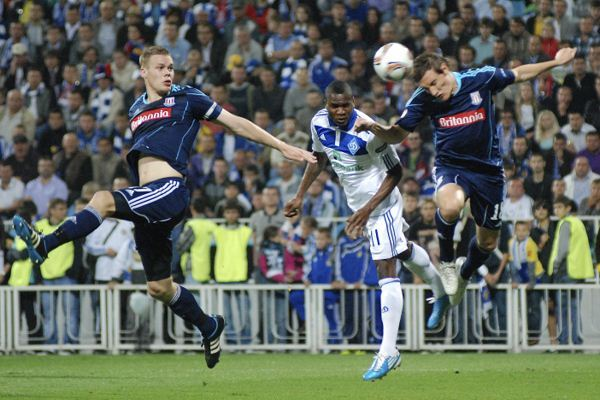
Whitehead (right) headed the ball away during the UEFA Europa League match against FC Dynamo Kyiv in 2011.

Ahead of the 2011–12 season, Whitehead said he expected to face new competition in the club's midfield section. He then made his 100th appearance for Stoke on 3 November 2011 in a UEFA Europa League match against Maccabi Tel Aviv, scoring the first goal in a 2–1 victory. He played in 10 of Stoke's 12 European fixtures in 2011–12, and ended the season having played in 47 matches in total. He made a bad start to 2012–13, as on the opening day of the season away to Reading, he conceded a 90th-minute penalty. He was sent off after picking up a second yellow card. He remained back-up to Glenn Whelan for the remainder of the season, being used mainly as a substitute, although he was assigned as a stand-in right-back in the absence of Andy Wilkinson and Ryan Shotton. He was released by Stoke at the end of 2012–13.

=== Middlesbrough ===
Whitehead signed a two-year contract with Championship club Middlesbrough on 2 July 2013. Manager Tony Mowbray revealed that Whitehead's experience of gaining promotion from the Championship twice was the key reason in signing him. Upon joining the club, he was given a number 18 shirt ahead of a new season. He made his Middlesbrough debut in a 2–1 loss against Leicester City in the opening game of the season. Since joining the club, he quickly established himself in the starting eleven in the midfield position. Despite being in the first-team, Whitehead faced strong competition from other midfielders at the Riverside Stadium. After missing four matches between late–October and late–November, he returned as a late substitute on 30 November 2013, in a 1–0 win over Bolton Wanderers. Whitehead scored his first and what turned out to be only goal for the club in a 2–1 loss away to Derby County on 4 December. Two weeks later, on 21 December, he captained Middlesbrough for the first time, in a 2–0 win over Millwall. Later in the 2013–14 season, Whitehead was suspended on three occasions, including being sent–off for dissent, in a 1–0 loss against Sheffield Wednesday on 1 March. Despite this, he remained in the first-team, where he captained the side four more times later in the season. Whitehead played 38 times and scored one goal in the 2013–14 season, as Middlesbrough finished in 12th-position.

In the 2014–15 season, Whitehead continued to feature in the first team at the start of the season, mostly coming on as a substitute. This was due to added competition for the defensive midfield position with Richard Smallwood, Grant Leadbitter and Adam Clayton. However, in a 4–0 win over Brentford on 20 September, he was sent–off "for an over the top tackle", leading the referee giving him a straight red card. After serving a three-match suspension, he returned to the first-team from suspension, coming on as a late substitute, in a 2–0 win over Fulham on 2 October. Whitehead captained the side for the first time in the league, in a 1–1 draw against Watford on 25 October. However, throughout the 2014–15 season, Whitehead was demoted to the substitute bench. But he did provide cover, playing twice at right–back and six times in central midfield. He also captained the side once again this season against Sheffield Wednesday on 28 February, which ended in a 2–0 defeat. In the Championship play-offs, Whitehead was featured three times as a right–back, including the play-off final at Wembley, where they lost 2–0 to Norwich City. Whitehead made twenty–five appearances in all competitions. At the end of the season, Whitehead left Middlesbrough as manager Aitor Karanka could not guarantee him game time.

=== Huddersfield Town ===
In June 2015, Whitehead signed for Championship club Huddersfield Town on a two-year contract. Upon joining the club, he was given a number four shirt ahead of the 2015–16 season. He made his debut in a 2–0 defeat against Hull City at the KC Stadium on 8 August. He captained Huddersfield Town for the first time on 11 August, in a 2–1 loss against Notts County. Whitehead quickly established himself in the first-team under the management of Chris Powell. He captained the side once again following Mark Hudson's absence for five matches between 12 September and 3 October. Whitehead's performance saw him earned BWF Player of the Month for October and November. However, he suffered a knee injury during a 2–0 win over Birmingham City on 5 December and was sidelined for two months. A month later, on 23 January, Whitehead returned to the first-team from injury, coming on as a late substitute in a 2–1 loss against Brighton & Hove Albion. Since returning to the first-team, he regained his first-team place in the starting eleven for the rest of the season. By the end of the 2015–16 season, Whitehead went on to make thirty–six appearances in all competitions.

Ahead of the 2016–17 season, Whitehead turned down a move to Rotherham United and said he would fight for his place in the first-team. He missed the first two matches of the new season after being suspended over his involvement in an incident against Brentford in the last game of the previous season. He made his first appearance of the season on 20 August, where he started the whole game of a 2–1 win over Barnsley. However, Whitehead struggled in the first-team under David Wagner, due to strong competition from other midfielders. He captained the side for the first time this season, in a 2–1 win over Rotherham United on 27 September. Due to Hudson's absence, Whitehead often stood in as captain, though Tommy Smith was another stand-in captain when Whitehead was not included in the starting eleven. Throughout the January transfer window, he stayed at the Kirklees Stadium after being linked with a move to Wigan Athletic. However, in a 1–0 loss against Burton Albion on 1 April, he was sent–off for a second bookable offence. Whitehead later featured three times as an unused substitute in the Championship play–offs, as he was part of the squad that saw Huddersfield side promoted to the Premier League after beating Reading 5–4 in penalty shoot–out after a 0–0 draw in the EFL Championship play-off final. By the end of the 2016–17 season, he went on to make twenty appearances in all competitions.

Ahead of the 2017–18 season, Huddersfield announced that Whitehead had extended his contract with the club until the end of the 2017–18 Premier League season, with manager David Wagner stating: "Even if he plays less for us, he is still a very important part of the team and our dressing room." He was included for the 25-man squad for the Premier League. He made his first appearance of the 2017–18 season, where he started the whole game, in a 2–1 win over Rotherham United in the second round of the League Cup on 23 August. Then, on 30 September, Whitehead made his first Premier League appearance – his first in four years – as a late substitute, in a 4–0 loss against Tottenham Hotspur. However, his first-team appearances at Huddersfield Town continued to be restricted to the substitute bench for most of the 2017–18 season. On 11 May 2018, Whitehead announced his retirement from professional football at the end of the 2017–18 season. He made his last appearance for the club (and his football career), coming on as a late substitute, in a 1–0 loss against Arsenal in the last game of the season.

== Coaching career ==
Following his retirement, Whitehead took up a coaching role at Huddersfield Town as part of David Wagner's first-team technical staff, having earned a UEFA A coaching license, and took charge of the club's new Under-17 Academy age group from 1 January 2019. By October, he took charge for Huddersfield Town's Under-17s side.

On 16 November 2019, Whitehead joined Sam Ricketts' backroom staff at League One side Shrewsbury Town, replacing Joe Parkinson as first-team coach. On 25 August 2020, Whitehead was promoted to assistant manager after the departure of Jon Pitts and Graham Barrow. On 25 November, Whitehead and Ricketts were relieved of their duties with the club sitting 23rd in League One with just 9 points from a possible 39.

Whitehead joined the coaching staff at League Two side Port Vale in July 2021 as part of director of football David Flitcroft's summer overhaul; manager Darrell Clarke said that Whitehead "is definitely someone our squad can look up to". Having helped Vale to win promotion at the end of the 2021–22 season, he moved to Turkey in July 2022 to coach alongside Adam Murray at Süper Lig champions Beşiktaş. He left the club when head coach Valérien Ismaël was sacked three months later. He joined Cardiff City as a first-team coach in November 2022. Following the sacking of Mark Hudson on 14 January 2023, Whitehead was placed in interim charge of the first-team at Cardiff City. In the 2023 pre-season, Ismaël was appointed manager at Championship side Watford, and Whitehead moved to work there with him as assistant head coach. He joined Barnsley as a first-team coach in July 2024, working again with Darrell Clarke. He returned to Stoke City in September 2024 to link back up with Narcís Pèlach. He left his position at Stoke in January 2025. He joined Blackburn Rovers as an assistant head coach the following month after Ismaël was appointed as manager. He departed the club alongside Ismaël on 2 February 2026. He joined Tranmere Rovers as Darrell Clarke's assistant in June 2026.

== Personal life ==
Growing up, Whitehead was raised in a football-loving family and supported Liverpool. He has a brother, Craig. During his time at Huddersfield Town, he was known as 'Whitesey' by his teammate Tommy Smith, who gave him a nickname.

He is good friends with Liam Lawrence, having been Sunderland and Stoke City teammates. During his time at Stoke City and Huddersfield Town, Whitehead resided in Cheshire with his wife, Louise, and their two sons, Olly and Harry.

== Career statistics ==
Appearances and goals by club, season and competition
Club	Season	League			FA Cup		League Cup		Other		Total	
Club	Season	Division	Apps	Goals	Apps	Goals	Apps	Goals	Apps	Goals	Apps	Goals
Oxford United	1999–2000	Second Division	0	0	0	0	0	0	1 (Note: Appearance in Football League Trophy)	0	1	0
Oxford United	2000–01	Second Division	20	0	1	0	2	0	0	0	23	0
Oxford United	2001–02	Third Division	40	1	1	0	1	0	1	0	43	1
Oxford United	2002–03	Third Division	18	1	2	0	1	0	1	0	22	1
Oxford United	2003–04	Third Division	44	7	1	0	2	0	0	0	47	7
Oxford United	Total		122	9	5	0	6	0	3	0	136	9
Sunderland	2004–05	Championship	42	5	2	0	2	0	—		46	5
Sunderland	2005–06	Premier League	37	3	2	1	2	0	—		41	4
Sunderland	2006–07	Championship	45	4	1	0	1	0	—		47	4
Sunderland	2007–08	Premier League	27	1	1	0	0	0	—		28	1
Sunderland	2008–09	Premier League	34	0	1	0	3	0	—		38	0
Sunderland	Total		185	13	7	1	8	0	—		200	14
Stoke City	2009–10	Premier League	36	0	4	1	0	0	—		40	1
Stoke City	2010–11	Premier League	37	2	4	0	2	0	—		43	2
Stoke City	2011–12	Premier League	33	0	4	0	0	0	10 (Note: Appearances in UEFA Europa League)	1	47	1
Stoke City	2012–13	Premier League	26	1	3	0	1	0	—		30	1
Stoke City	Total		132	3	15	1	3	0	10	1	160	5
Middlesbrough	2013–14	Championship	37	1	1	0	0	0	—		38	1
Middlesbrough	2014–15	Championship	18	0	2	0	2	0	3 (Note: Appearances in Championship play-offs)	0	25	0
Middlesbrough	Total		55	1	3	0	2	0	3	0	63	1
Huddersfield Town	2015–16	Championship	34	0	1	0	1	0	—		36	0
Huddersfield Town	2016–17	Championship	16	0	4	0	0	0	0	0	20	0
Huddersfield Town	2017–18	Premier League	4	0	1	0	2	0	—		7	0
Huddersfield Town	Total		54	0	6	0	3	0	0	0	63	0
Career total			548	26	36	2	22	0	16	1	622	29

== Honours ==
Sunderland

- Football League Championship: 2004–05, 2006–07

Stoke City

- FA Cup runner-up: 2010–11

Huddersfield Town

- EFL Championship play-offs: 2017

Individual

- Oxford United Player of the Season: 2003–04
- Sunderland Player of the Year: 2005–06
- PFA Team of the Year: 2006–07 Championship
