= Jamie Cook (footballer) =

English footballer (born 1979)

Personal information
- Full name: James Steven Cook
- Date of birth: 2 August 1979 (age 47)
- Place of birth: Oxford, England
- Height: 5 ft 10 in (1.78 m)
- Position: Striker

Youth career
- ?–1997: Oxford United

Senior career*
Years	Team	Apps	(Gls)
1997–2001	Oxford United	77	(7)
2001–2003	Boston United	59	(7)
2003–2004	Stevenage Borough	35	(2)
2004	→ Bath City (loan)	11	(3)
2005–2007	Witney United	37	(25)
2007	Rushden & Diamonds	8	(1)
2007–2009	Crawley Town	78	(33)
2009–2010	Oxford United	16	(3)
2010–2011	Crawley Town	22	(2)
2011–2012	Bath City	24	(1)
2012–2014	Oxford City	67	(23)
2014–2016	North Leigh	46	(18)
Total		480	(125)
- * Club domestic league appearances and goals

James Steven Cook (born 2 August 1979) is an English footballer.

== Career ==
Cook started his career with his hometown club Oxford United, where he played 77 times in the Football League, scoring seven goals. He then joined Boston United in February 2000, where he was a part of the team that beat Dagenham & Redbridge to the Conference title that season. The midfielder then had a spell with Conference side Stevenage Borough in 2002 before joining Bath City on loan.

In 2005–06 he revived his football career with Hellenic League outfit Witney United scoring more than 30 goals before making a move to Rushden & Diamonds in January 2007, where he stayed for three months making 7 Conference appearances, scoring a single goal.

Cook rejoined former Boston United manager Steve Evans at Crawley Town at the start of the 2007–08 season. On 19 January 2008, Cook scored a hat-trick in the 4–1 win over his former club Rushden & Diamonds.

He went back to Oxford United for £5000 in a transfer funded by Oxford United fans, with Crawley desperate to reduce their wage bill due to financial difficulties, on 1 September 2009. After scoring only three goals in 16 appearances, he left the club by mutual consent on 28 June 2010. Although he was a target for Rushden & Diamonds, he rejoined Crawley Town a day after leaving Oxford. On 31 May 2011, he signed for Bath City.

Jamie is also the subject of the song "Jamie Cook" by the singer/songwriter Gavin Osborn which features on the album In The Twee Small Hours.

== Career statistics ==
Appearances and goals by club, season and competition
Club	Season	League			FA Cup		League Cup		Other		Total	
Club	Season	Division	Apps	Goals	Apps	Goals	Apps	Goals	Apps	Goals	Apps	Goals
Oxford United	1997–98	First Division	20	2	1	0	0	0	0	0	21	2
Oxford United	1998–99	First Division	19	1	2	0	1	0	0	0	22	1
Oxford United	1999–2000	Second Division	29	3	4	0	4	0	3	0	40	3
Oxford United	2000–01	Second Division	9	1	0	0	0	0	0	0	9	1
Oxford United	Total		77	7	7	0	5	0	3	0	92	7
Boston United	2000–01	Football Conference	13	2	0	0	0	0	0	0	13	2
Boston United	2001–02	Football Conference	30	3	0	0	0	0	0	0	30	3
Boston United	2002–03	Football Conference	16	2	1	0	1	0	0	0	18	2
Boston United	Total		59	7	1	0	1	0	0	0	61	7
Stevenage	2002–03	Football Conference	12	1	0	0	0	0	0	0	12	1
Stevenage	2003–04	Football Conference	23	1	1	0	0	0	1	0	25	1
Stevenage	Total		35	2	1	0	0	0	1	0	37	2
Rushden & Diamonds	2006–07	Football Conference	8	1	0	0	0	0	1	0	9	1
Crawley Town	2007–08	Football Conference	40	16	0	0	0	0	1	0	41	16
Crawley Town	2008–09	Football Conference	32	13	0	0	0	0	0	0	32	13
Crawley Town	2009–10	Football Conference	5	3	0	0	0	0	0	0	5	3
Crawley Town	Total		77	32	0	0	0	0	1	0	78	32
Oxford United	2009–10	Football Conference	16	3	3	1	0	0	0	0	19	4
Crawley Town	2010–11	Football Conference	22	2	5	0	0	0	0	0	27	2
Bath City	2011–12	Football Conference	24	1	1	0	0	0	0	0	25	1
Oxford City	2012–13	Conference North	35	10	0	0	0	0	1	0	36	10
Oxford City	2013–14	Conference North	21	4	1	0	0	0	0	0	22	4
Oxford City	2014–15	Conference North	1	0	0	0	0	0	0	0	1	0
Oxford City	Total		57	14	1	0	0	0	1	0	59	14
Career total			375	69	19	1	6	0	7	0	407	70
