= Christophe Rémy =

French footballer (born 1971)

Personal information
- Date of birth: August 6, 1971 (age 53)
- Place of birth: France
- Position(s): Defender

Senior career*
Years	Team	Apps	(Gls)
1989-1996	AJ Auxerre	28	(0)
	Derby County	0	(0)
1997-1999	Oxford United	28	(1)
- *Club domestic league appearances and goals

Christophe Remy (born 6 August 1971) is a French former professional footballer who played for AJ Auxerre, Derby County, and Oxford United.

== Career ==
=== France ===
Remy played 28 games for AJ Auxerre from 1989 to 1996, when he transferred to Derby County. He failed to make an appearance for Derby and joined Oxford United on a free transfer after a successful trial in the summer of 1997.

=== England ===
Described as urbane and calm on the ball, Remy missed part of 1997–98 due to injury, losing his position to right-back Les Robinson. However, coach Malcolm Shotton announced that he would 'start from scratch', not based on the last season's performances. Despite expressing gratitude at the idea, the Frenchman was ruled out from the U's 1998/99 opener but was on target on 21 February even though Oxford went down 2-1 to Ipswich Town, dedicating his goal to his newborn son, Lucas.
