= Jon Shepheard =

English footballer (born 1981)

Personal information
- Full name: Jonathan Shepheard
- Date of birth: 31 March 1981 (age 45)
- Place of birth: Oxford, England
- Position: Defender

Senior career*
Years	Team	Apps	(Gls)
1999–2002	Oxford United	7	(0)
- * Club domestic league appearances and goals

Jonathan Shepheard (born 31 March 1981) is a former professional footballer who played in The Football League for Oxford United.

Shepheard's first appearance was in the Football League Trophy on 11 January 2000. This was followed by another appearance in the same competition and two in the Football League by the end of the 1999–2000 season. The following season he played in five games in the league and two in the League Cup; he scored one goal for the club, which was against Wolverhampton Wanderers in a 3–1 defeat in the League Cup.
