= Jamie Brooks =

English footballer

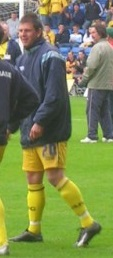
- Brooks warming up for Oxford United in 2006

Personal information
- Date of birth: 12 August 1983 (age 43)
- Place of birth: Oxford, England
- Position: Striker

Team information
- Current team: Abingdon Town

Youth career
- Oxford United

Senior career*
Years	Team	Apps	(Gls)
2000–2006	Oxford United	50	(13)
2003–2004	→ Maidenhead United (loan)		
2004	→ Tamworth (loan)	1	(1)
2004	→ Slough Town (loan)		
2005–2006	→ Brackley Town (loan)		
2006–2007	Didcot Town		
2007–2008	Abingdon United		
2008–2010	Oxford City		
2010–2012	Abingdon United		
2012	Witney Town		
2013–	Abingdon Town		
- * Club domestic league appearances and goals as of 11:28, 17 July 2013 (UTC)

Jamie Brooks (born 12 August 1983) is an English former footballer.

Brooks came through the youth system at Oxford United, playing as a striker. He marked his first-team debut, as a 17-year-old, with a goal and an assist at the end of the 2001–02 season. In his first season at the Kassam Stadium he walked away with all four player of the year awards. He was due to go on trial with Arsenal with a view to a move to the Premiership club, but the day before the trial he was rushed to hospital, fighting for his life. The mystery illness was later diagnosed as Guillain–Barré syndrome. He was in intensive care for over four months. It took Brooks over a year to recover and on his return to the game, he went on loan to Maidenhead United.

In February 2004 he joined Tamworth on loan until the end of the season and scored for the club on his debut. Further loan spells followed with Slough Town and Brackley Town.

He was released by Oxford in May 2006 but rejoined the club in September as a coach at the Centre of Excellence, responsible for coaching the under-9 age group.

Dropping down to non-league level, he joined Didcot Town in July 2006, despite having been offered a two-year professional contract by a club in the northwest of England. His next move was to Abingdon United in July 2007. He joined Oxford City in September 2008, remaining with the club until August 2010. He rejoined Abingdon the following month.

In July 2012, it was announced that he had signed for Witney Town of the Hellenic Premier Division. He joined Abingdon Town in July 2013.
