= Jon Richardson (footballer) =

English footballer

Personal information
- Full name: Jonathan Richardson
- Date of birth: 29 August 1975 (age 51)
- Place of birth: Nottingham, England
- Position: Central defender

Youth career
- Exeter City

Senior career*
Years	Team	Apps	(Gls)
1994–2000	Exeter City	273	(11)
2000–2002	Oxford United	63	(2)
2002–2006	Forest Green Rovers	126	(7)
2006–2008	Exeter City	37	(0)
2008–2010	Worcester City	?	(?)
2010–	Chasetown	?	(?)
- * Club domestic league appearances and goals as of 19 May 2008

Jon Richardson (born 29 August 1975) is a former professional footballer. A central defender, he was originally a trainee at Exeter City, making his debut in 1994. He impressed straight away, and went on to make almost 250 league appearances for the Grecians over the next six years, many of which were as club captain.

In 2000, City manager Noel Blake decided to clear out much of the squad, Richardson was one of the players to go. He got a decent move, though, joining then Second Division side Oxford United for £5,000.

He was a first-team regular in his first season at Oxford, but despite personally putting in reasonable performances, Oxford were relegated, adrift at the bottom of the league with only 27 points. The following season, new manager Mark Wright attempted to rebuild the squad, and in doing so brought in a couple of centre-backs (Phil Bolland and Scott Guyett) from his former club, Southport. This limited Rico's appearances and he found himself on the bench for most games. Even when Ian Atkins replaced Wright after only six-months, he could not find a place in the team, and was released the following summer.

At this point he joined Forest Green Rovers, where he remained until May 2006 making well over 100 appearances and having a spell as captain. He was released on a free transfer before linking up with the Grecians once again. He was largely used as a backup during his time at Exeter, which ended after he turned down a new one-year contract offered to him in 2008 and decided to concentrate on his physiotherapy degree. He later signed for Conference South side Worcester City.
