= Simon Marsh =

English footballer

Personal information
- Full name: Simon Thomas Peter Marsh
- Date of birth: 29 January 1977 (age 49)
- Place of birth: Ealing, England
- Height: 5 ft 11 in (1.80 m)
- Position: Defender

Youth career
- 1993–1994: Oxford United

Senior career*
Years	Team	Apps	(Gls)
1994–1998	Oxford United	56	(3)
1998–2001	Birmingham City	7	(0)
2000	→ Brentford (loan)	4	(0)
2002–2003	Tamworth		

International career
1998	England U21	1	(0)
- * Club domestic league appearances and goals

Simon Thomas Peter Marsh (born 29 January 1977) is an English former professional footballer who played in the Football League for Oxford United, Birmingham City and Brentford.

== Playing career ==
Marsh was born in Ealing, London. Primarily a left back, he joined Oxford United as a YTS trainee when he left school in 1993. He made his debut in the Football League Second Division, the third tier of English football, on 17 September 1994 in a 1–1 draw at Brighton & Hove Albion. This was the first of 13 first-team appearances in 1994–95, his second season as a trainee, and he signed professional forms at the end of that season.

In May 1998 he received his first call-up to the England under-21 team as part of the squad for the Toulon Tournament; he started England's first group game, a 1–1 draw with France under-21, but took no part in the remainder of the competition. Though that was his only cap for the full under-21 side, he played for a representative Football League under-21 team which drew 1–1 with their Italian Serie B counterparts in November 1998.

The next month, with Oxford in severe financial difficulties, Marsh joined First Division (second-tier) club Birmingham City for a fee of £250,000, with additional amounts payable dependent on appearances and Birmingham's future promotion. He had made 68 appearances for Oxford in all competitions. He made his debut against his former club, as a second-half substitute with Birmingham already 5–0 up on their way to inflicting Oxford's record home defeat, 7–1. After less than two months with Birmingham, Marsh developed back trouble. He underwent a variety of treatments, including surgery, but ten months later was still unable to play. At the end of the 1999–2000 season, with no improvement in sight, he was told he should look for another club.

In September 2000 Marsh joined Brentford on loan. Despite his giving away a penalty on his debut, Brentford were interested on making the move permanent if a fee could be agreed. No agreement was reached, and Marsh returned to Birmingham at the end of the month. He never played for the first team again, though appeared regularly for the reserves. In April 2001, with two years remaining on his contract, player and club agreed a severance package.

In 2002 Marsh trained with Southern League team Tamworth in an attempt to regain fitness. He played half a reserve game for the club on a trial basis, but was shown to be still far from match-fit. By the start of the 2002–03 season, his fitness had improved sufficiently for Tamworth to sign him. Minor injuries continued to disrupt Marsh's career, and a loan move to Moor Green was suggested, but this did not happen because Tamworth were short of fit players. In February 2003, Marsh had to finish playing on medical advice after sustaining a serious back injury; his club went on to win the Southern League title and reach the final of the FA Trophy.
