= Ben Abbey =

English footballer

Personal information
- Full name: Benjamin Charles Abbey
- Date of birth: 13 May 1978 (age 48)
- Place of birth: London, England
- Height: 5 ft 7 in (1.70 m)
- Position: Striker

Senior career*
Years	Team	Apps	(Gls)
1997	Maidenhead United	22	(12)
1997–1999	Crawley Town	97	(46)
1999–2001	Oxford United	10	(1)
2000	→ Aldershot Town (loan)	5	(1)
2000	→ Southend United (loan)	6	(4)
2001–2002	Southend United	23	(7)
2002	→ Stevenage Borough (loan)	1	(0)
2002–2003	Woking	26	(7)
2003-2005	Macclesfield Town	0	(0)
2003	→ Gravesend & Northfleet(loan)	22	(6)
2004	→ St Albans City(loan)	2	(1)
2005	→ Northwood(loan)	15	(4)
2005–2006	Metropolitan Police	22	(8)
2006–2009	Tooting & Mitcham	31	(13)
2010–2013	Slough Town	60	(11)
Total		342	(121)
- * Club domestic league appearances and goals

Benjamin Charles Abbey (born 13 May 1978) is an English former footballer. He had spells in the Football League with Oxford United, Southend United and Macclesfield Town. Abbey has since moved on to forge a successful career in Finance and Sports Management.

Abbey joined Division Two club Oxford United from Crawley Town in September 1999 for a fee of £30,000.
