= Les Robinson (footballer) =

English footballer

Personal information
- Full name: Leslie Robinson
- Date of birth: 1 March 1967 (age 59)
- Place of birth: Shirebrook, England
- Height: 5 ft 8 in (1.73 m)
- Position: Defender

Youth career
- 1983–1984: Chesterfield F.C.

Senior career*
Years	Team	Apps	(Gls)
1984–1986	Mansfield Town	15	(0)
1986–1988	Stockport County	67	(3)
1988–1990	Doncaster Rovers	82	(12)
1990–2000	Oxford United	459	(6)
2000–2002	Mansfield Town	80	(0)
2007–2009	Banbury United		
Total		703	(1)
- * Club domestic league appearances and goals

Leslie Robinson (born 1 March 1967) is an English retired footballer who played as a defender. He played for Chesterfield, Mansfield Town, Stockport County, Doncaster Rovers, Banbury United and spent ten years at Oxford United where he is sixth in the list of players with the most appearances.

Born and raised in Shirebrook, the defender played football for Chesterfield F.C., before turning professional with Mansfield Town F.C. in 1984. Two years later he was sold on to Stockport County F.C. for a free transfer. He was sold on to Doncaster Rovers F.C. for £10,000. In March 1990, he was transferred to Oxford United for £150,000. He would later become the captain of Oxford and make 459 appearances for them.

In the later parts of his career and especially following retirement, Robinson's life changed. He is now an Assistant Head Teacher at Swalcliffe Park School, a school catering for boys with autism near Banbury.

== Testimonial ==
On 7 May 2018, a testimonial match was played in his honour at the Kassam Stadium as Oxford played a Liverpool Legends XI. His grandchildren acted as the match's mascots. The game was played by famous ex-players from both sides, including Joey Beauchamp, Paul Kee and Phil Gilchrist for Oxford and Phil Neal, Alan Kennedy and Paul Walsh for Liverpool. Oxford won the match 1–0 with a goal from Paul Wanless.
