= Steve Anthrobus =

English footballer and manager

Personal information
- Full name: Stephen Anthony Anthrobus
- Date of birth: 10 November 1968 (age 57)
- Place of birth: Lewisham, England
- Height: 6 ft 2 in (1.88 m)
- Position: Striker

Youth career
- –1986: Millwall

Senior career*
Years	Team	Apps	(Gls)
1986–1990	Millwall	21	(4)
1990–1994	Wimbledon	28	(0)
1994	→ Peterborough United (loan)	2	(0)
1994	→ Chester City (loan)	7	(0)
1995–1997	Shrewsbury Town	72	(16)
1997–1999	Crewe Alexandra	61	(9)
1999–2001	Oxford United	55	(3)
2001–2003	Total Network Solutions	50	(4)
2003–2006	Hednesford Town		
Total		296	(36)

Managerial career
- 2003–2006: Hednesford Town
- * Club domestic league appearances and goals

Stephen Anthony Anthrobus (born 10 November 1968) is an English former professional footballer who played as a striker. Active in both England and Wales between 1986 and 2003, Anthrobus made nearly 300 career League appearances.

== Career ==
Born in Lewisham, Anthrobus played with the youth team of Millwall, later playing for Peterborough United, Chester City, Shrewsbury Town, Crewe Alexandra, Oxford United and Total Network Solutions.

== Honours ==
Shrewsbury Town

- Football League Trophy runner-up: 1995–96

Hednesford Town

- FA Trophy: 2003–04
