= Ross Weatherstone =

English footballer

Personal information
- Date of birth: 16 May 1981 (age 45)
- Place of birth: Reading, Berkshire, England
- Position: Defender

Team information
- Current team: Binfield (manager)

Youth career
- 1997–1999: Oxford United

Senior career*
Years	Team	Apps	(Gls)
1999–2001	Oxford United	19	(0)
2001–2003	Boston United	66	(1)
2003	Nuneaton Borough	9	(0)
2003–2004	Farnborough Town	29	(2)
2004	Stevenage Brough	6	(0)
2006	Didcot Town	25	(4)
Total		154	(7)

Managerial career
- 2022: Hartley Wintney
- 2023–: Binfield
- * Club domestic league appearances and goals

Ross Weatherstone (born 16 May 1981) is an English former professional footballer who played in the Football League for Oxford United and Boston United. He is currently the manager of Binfield.

== Playing career ==
Weatherstone started his career at Oxford United, making his debut live on Sky TV against Reading. His brother Simon was also an Oxford player and they became the first brothers to play for Oxford United since Ron Atkinson and Graham Atkinson in a competitive fixture.

In February 2001 Weatherstone and his brother signed for Boston United. They helped Boston United win the Football Conference in 2002, earning promotion to the Football League, with Ross captained the side for a handful of games.

Weatherstone left Boston United and joined Nuneaton Borough for a short spell at the end of the 2002–03 season. At the start 2003–04 season he signed for Farnborough Town, before joining Stevenage Brough midway through the season.

He retired from the professional game in 2005 after multiple operations to his left lateral meniscus. He made a brief comeback in 2006 when he signed for Didcot Town, officially retiring from playing the game in 2007.

== Coaching career ==
Having coached at Bracknell Town and Binfield, in May 2022 Weatherstone was appointed joint manager of Hartley Wintney alongside Ty Newton. The management duo resigned from their roles on 20 October 2022.

On 22 December 2023 he was announced as the new manager of Binfield.

== Personal life ==
Weatherstone was diagnosed with melanoma skin cancer in April 2024, subsequently taking some time out from his managerial role at Binfield in order to undergo major surgery.
