= Pål Lundin =

Swedish footballer

Personal information
- Full name: Pål Mikael Lundin
- Date of birth: 21 November 1964 (age 61)
- Place of birth: Osby, Sweden
- Position: Goalkeeper

Senior career*
Years	Team	Apps	(Gls)
–	Östers IF	190	(?)
1999–2000	Oxford United	27	(0)
2001–2003	Trelleborgs FF	46	(0)
- * Club domestic league appearances and goals

Pål Mikael Lundin (born 21 November 1964) is a former professional footballer who played in The Football League for Oxford United.
