= Phil Whelan =

English footballer

Personal information
- Full name: Philip James Whelan
- Date of birth: 7 August 1972 (age 54)
- Place of birth: Reddish, England
- Height: 6 ft 4 in (1.93 m)
- Position: Defender

Youth career
- ?–1990: Ipswich Town

Senior career*
Years	Team	Apps	(Gls)
1990–1995	Ipswich Town	81	(2)
1995–1997	Middlesbrough	22	(1)
1997–2000	Oxford United	54	(2)
1999	→ Rotherham United (loan)	13	(4)
2000–2003	Southend United	100	(6)
Total		253	(35)

International career
1992–1993	England U21	3	(0)
- * Club domestic league appearances and goals

Philip James Whelan (born 7 August 1972) is an English former professional footballer who played as a defender.

He notably played in the Premier League for Ipswich Town and Middlesbrough as well as having spells in the Football League with Oxford, Rotherham and Southend. He was capped three times by the England U21 team.

== Playing career ==
Born in Reddish in Stockport, Whelan began his career at Ipswich Town, signing professional terms with the club on 2 July 1990. He made his Ipswich debut in a Full Members Cup first round match against Bristol Rovers on 2 October 1991. He spent most of the 1991–92 season playing for the reserves in the Football Combination, not making his league debut until 4 April, when he scored the first goal in a 2–1 win at Southend United. He scored again in his second match for the first team three days later as Ipswich beat Wolverhampton Wanderers 2–1 at Portman Road, although he never scored for the club again. He went on to play six more games that season, as Ipswich won Division Two, earning promotion to the new Premier League.

The following season saw Whelan become a first-team regular, playing in 32 of the club's 42 Premier League matches. He also became an England U21 international, and was a member of the Great Britain team that competed in the World Student games in July 1993, qualifying as he was completing an accountancy degree at the University of East Anglia.

In 1993–94 Whelan played 28 league matches for Ipswich, but the following season saw him restricted to 12 league appearances. In March 1995 he was sold to Middlesbrough for £300,000, with his final Ipswich game being a 3–0 defeat to Norwich City in the East Anglian Derby. After 28 appearances, he left Middlesbrough in May 1997, signing for Oxford United for £170,000. He spent three seasons at Oxford, making 51 league appearances, and also had a brief loan spell at Rotherham United towards the end of the 1998–99 season.

In the summer of 2000, Whelan signed for Southend on a free transfer. He spent three seasons at Roots Hall, playing 100 league matches, before retiring at the end of the 2002–03 season.

== Personal life ==
Whelan later became a teacher and moved to Cheshire.
