= Nicky Banger =

English footballer (born 1971)

Personal information
- Full name: Nicholas Lee Banger
- Date of birth: 25 February 1971 (age 55)
- Place of birth: Southampton, Hampshire, England
- Height: 5 ft 8 in (1.73 m)
- Position: Striker

Youth career
- 1987–1989: Southampton

Senior career*
Years	Team	Apps	(Gls)
1989–1994	Southampton	55	(8)
1994–1997	Oldham Athletic	64	(10)
1997–1999	Oxford United	63	(8)
1999–2001	Dundee	6	(0)
2000	→ Scunthorpe United (loan)	1	(0)
2001	Plymouth Argyle	10	(2)
2002	Merthyr Tydfil	2	(0)
2002	Torquay United	1	(0)
2002	Andover	1	(0)
2002–2003	Woking	20	(4)
2003–2005	Eastleigh	15	(2)
2005	Newbury		
2005	Brockenhurst		
2005–2006	Lymington & New Milton		
- * Club domestic league appearances and goals

Nicholas Lee Banger (born 25 February 1971) is an English former professional footballer who played as a striker.

He notably played in the Premier League for Southampton at the beginning of his career, and later went on to feature in the Scottish Premiership for Dundee and in the Football League for Oldham Athletic, Oxford United, Scunthorpe United, Plymouth Argyle and Torquay United. He also played non-league football for Merthyr Tydfil, Andover, Woking, Eastleigh, Newbury, Brockenhurst and Lymington & New Milton.

Since retiring, Banger has remained in football but has worked in the commercial and corporate side of the game. He has held a variety of different positions in this sector for Romsey Town, Havant & Waterlooville, Aldershot Town and Woking.

== Playing career ==
Banger was born in Southampton and started his football career as a trainee with Southampton, turning professional in April 1989. He scored a hat-trick on his first team debut for the Saints, in a League Cup tie against Rochdale in 1990.

He moved to Oldham Athletic for a fee of £250,000 in October 1994 and remained at Boundary Park for almost three years, moving to Oxford United on a free transfer in August 1997.

Banger then moved to Dundee, again on a free transfer in October 1999, but was transfer listed by manager Ivano Bonetti in July 2000. He returned to England with a loan spell at Scunthorpe United in November 2000, finally leaving Dundee in August 2001 when he joined Plymouth Argyle on a short-term contract. He scored on his Plymouth debut, in a 3–1 win at home to Swansea City. However, he struggled with injuries and left Home Park in November the same year.

After time out with a back injury, he joined Torquay United on trial in January 2002, but left requiring further treatment. In February 2002 he joined Leroy Rosenior's Merthyr Tydfil, before finally signing for Torquay a month later, making his Gulls debut in 0–0 draw with Mansfield Town. This was his only appearance for Torquay as he asked to be released from his contract just a few days later due to his lack of fitness. After leaving the Gulls, he briefly joined non-league Andover, playing in the final game of the season as Andover drew 1–1 away to Fleet Town to clinch the Wessex League title and promotion to the Southern League.

Banger joined Woking in August 2002, moving to Eastleigh in February 2003 and again scoring on his club debut. In April 2004 he was appointed as full-time corporate manager and coach at Eastleigh, continuing as a player until his retirement in February 2005. He quit his coaching role at Eastleigh, although remained corporate manager until late February 2006, when he resigned after falling out with the team manager, in August 2005 when he joined AFC Newbury as a player.

In November 2005 Banger joined Brockenhurst as player-coach, but left the same month to take a similar role with Lymington & New Milton. He resigned from his post in June 2006, claiming that he felt restricted in a head coach role and wanted a managerial post.

== Commercial career ==
In December 2006, Banger was appointed as commercial manager at Romsey Town, but was sacked after just seventeen days in the post, amid rumours that he was announcing himself as the future team manager while allegedly tapping up players in readiness for next season. However, he was not out of work for long and on 19 February 2007 he began work as the new corporate sales manager with Havant & Waterlooville.

In 2008, he joined Aldershot Town as Corporate Sales Manager as they prepared for promotion to the Football League.

He was head of commercial operations with Woking F.C. until May 2016.

== Career statistics ==
Appearances and goals by club, season and competition
Club	Season	League			FA Cup		League Cup		Other		Total	
Club	Season	Division	Apps	Goals	Apps	Goals	Apps	Goals	Apps	Goals	Apps	Goals
Southampton
Southampton	1990–91	First Division	6	0	0	0	1	3	—		7	3
Southampton	1991–92	First Division	4	0	0	0	1	0	1 (Note: Appearances in Full Members' Cup)	0	6	0
Southampton	1992–93	Premier League	27	6	1	0	1	0	—		29	6
Southampton	1993–94	Premier League	14	0	1	0	1	0	—		16	0
Southampton	1994–95	Premier League	4	2	0	0	0	0	—		4	2
Southampton	Total		55	8	2	0	4	3	1	0	62	11
Oldham Athletic
Oldham Athletic	1994–95	First Division	28	3	1	0	2	0	—		31	3
Oldham Athletic	1995–96	First Division	13	2	1	0	0	0	1 (Note: Appearances in Anglo-Italian Cup)	0	15	2
Oldham Athletic	1996–97	First Division	23	5	1	0	4	1	—		28	6
Oldham Athletic	Total		64	10	3	0	6	1	1	0	74	11
Oxford United
Oxford United	1997–98	First Division	28	3	0	0	5	0	—		33	3
Oxford United	1998–99	First Division	32	5	3	0	2	0	—		37	5
Oxford United	1999–2000	Second Division	3	0	0	0	1	0	—		4	0
Oxford United	Total		63	8	3	0	8	0	0	0	74	8
Dundee	1999–2000	Scottish Premier League	6	0	2 (Note: Appearances in Scottish Cup)	0	1 (Note: Appearances in Scottish League Cup)	0	—		9	0
Scunthorpe United (loan)	2000–01	Third Division	1	0	0	0	0	0	—		1	0
Plymouth Argyle	2001–02	Third Division	10	2	0	0	0	0	1 (Note: Appearances in EFL Trophy)	0	11	2
Merthyr Tydfil	2001–02	Southern Premier League	2	0	0	0	—		—		2	0
Torquay United	2001–02	Third Division	1	0	0	0	0	0	—		1	0
Andover	2001–02	Wessex League	1	0	0	0	—		—		1	0
Woking	2002–03	National Conference	20	4	0	0	—		1	0	21	4
Eastleigh	2004–05	Isthmian Premier Division	15	2	0	0	—		—		15	2
Career total			238	34	10	0	19	4	4	0	271	38
