= Mickey Lewis =

English footballer (1965–2021)

Personal information
- Full name: Michael Lewis
- Date of birth: 15 February 1965
- Place of birth: Birmingham, England
- Date of death: 5 March 2021 (aged 56)
- Height: 5 ft 6 in (1.68 m)
- Position: Defensive midfielder

Youth career
- 1981–1982: West Bromwich Albion

Senior career*
Years	Team	Apps	(Gls)
1981–1984	West Bromwich Albion	33	(0)
1984–1988	Derby County	50	(1)
1988–1999	Oxford United	350	(7)
2001	Des Moines Menace (player-coach)		
Total		433	(8)

International career
1982	England U17	3	(0)

Managerial career
- 1999–2000: Oxford United (caretaker)
- 2006: Doncaster Rovers (assistant)
- 2014: Oxford United (caretaker)
- 2016: Hayes & Yeading
- * Club domestic league appearances and goals

Michael Lewis (15 February 1965 – 5 March 2021) was an English professional footballer and manager who played for West Bromwich Albion, Derby County and Oxford United. From October 1999 to February 2000 and then again from January to March 2014 he was the caretaker manager at League Two side Oxford United following the departure of manager Chris Wilder to Northampton Town, before Gary Waddock was appointed head coach.

He left Oxford in the middle of 2015 after a 27-year association with the club, and 8 years as a member of the coaching staff, and was appointed head coach/manager at Hayes & Yeading United in May 2016 after the departure of Garry Haylock. He stepped down as first-team manager in October 2016.

== Death ==
Lewis died on 5 March 2021, aged 56, shortly after being diagnosed with lung cancer.
