= Paul Powell (footballer) =

English footballer (born 1978)

Personal information
- Full name: Paul Powell
- Date of birth: 30 June 1978 (age 48)
- Place of birth: Wallingford, England
- Height: 5 ft 8 in (1.73 m)
- Position: Midfielder

Senior career*
Years	Team	Apps	(Gls)
1994–2003	Oxford United	178	(17)
2003	Tamworth	5	(0)
2003–2009	Didcot Town	196	(49)
2009–2013	Didcot Casuals		
2013–????	Milton United	0	(0)
- * Club domestic league appearances and goals as of 02:45, 23 September 2007 (UTC)

Paul Powell (born 30 June 1978) is an English former professional footballer. He played as a midfielder, making nearly 180 league appearances for Oxford United between 1994 and 2003.
