= Malcolm Shotton =

English footballer and manager

Personal information
- Full name: Malcolm Shotton
- Date of birth: 16 February 1957 (age 69)
- Place of birth: Newcastle upon Tyne, England
- Height: 6 ft 3 in (1.91 m)
- Position: Defender

Senior career*
Years	Team	Apps	(Gls)
1974–1975	Leicester City	0	(0)
1975–1979	Atherstone Town		
1979–1980	Nuneaton Borough	50	(5)
1980–1987	Oxford United	263	(12)
1987–1988	Portsmouth	10	(0)
1988	Huddersfield Town	16	(1)
1988–1990	Barnsley	66	(6)
1990–1992	Hull City	59	(2)
1992–1994	Ayr United	73	(3)
1994–1996	Barnsley	10	(1)

Managerial career
- 1998–1999: Oxford United
- * Club domestic league appearances and goals

Malcolm Shotton (born 16 February 1957) is an English former professional footballer and manager. He was on the books of Leicester City as an apprentice but failed to make the break into senior football there. He played for Atherstone United and Nuneaton Borough in non-league football before signing for Oxford United in 1980. He formed a notable defensive partnership with Gary Briggs and went on to become captain of the side as they rose from Division Three to Division One. His finest moment as captain was lifting the Milk Cup at Wembley Stadium in April 1986. At the end of the following season he was transferred to Portsmouth. He later played for Huddersfield Town, Barnsley, Hull City and Ayr United and, after his playing career ended, served as assistant manager at Barnsley.

In 1998 he returned to Oxford as manager, replacing Malcolm Crosby. His appointment was popular and initially successful, as he led the team out of relegation danger to a creditable 12th-place finish in Division One. However, United were relegated to Division Two at the end of the following season, and Shotton resigned in October 1999, with the club in serious danger of a second successive relegation.

In 2021, it was revealed on the Football Cliches podcast that three early teenagers impersonated Shotton to make fake transfer enquiries directly to club managers. This led to Roy Evans, Martin O'Neill, Barry Fry and others to speculate on transfer dealings directly to the impersonators who ran their scam from a payphone. It is unclear whether Shotton was aware of this during his Oxford United tenure.

Shotton later served as assistant manager at Bradford City Director of Football at Loughborough University and manager of Barnsley College Academy Team.

== Honours ==
Oxford United

- Football League Third Division: 1983–84
- Football League Cup: 1985–86
