= Simon Weatherstone =

English footballer

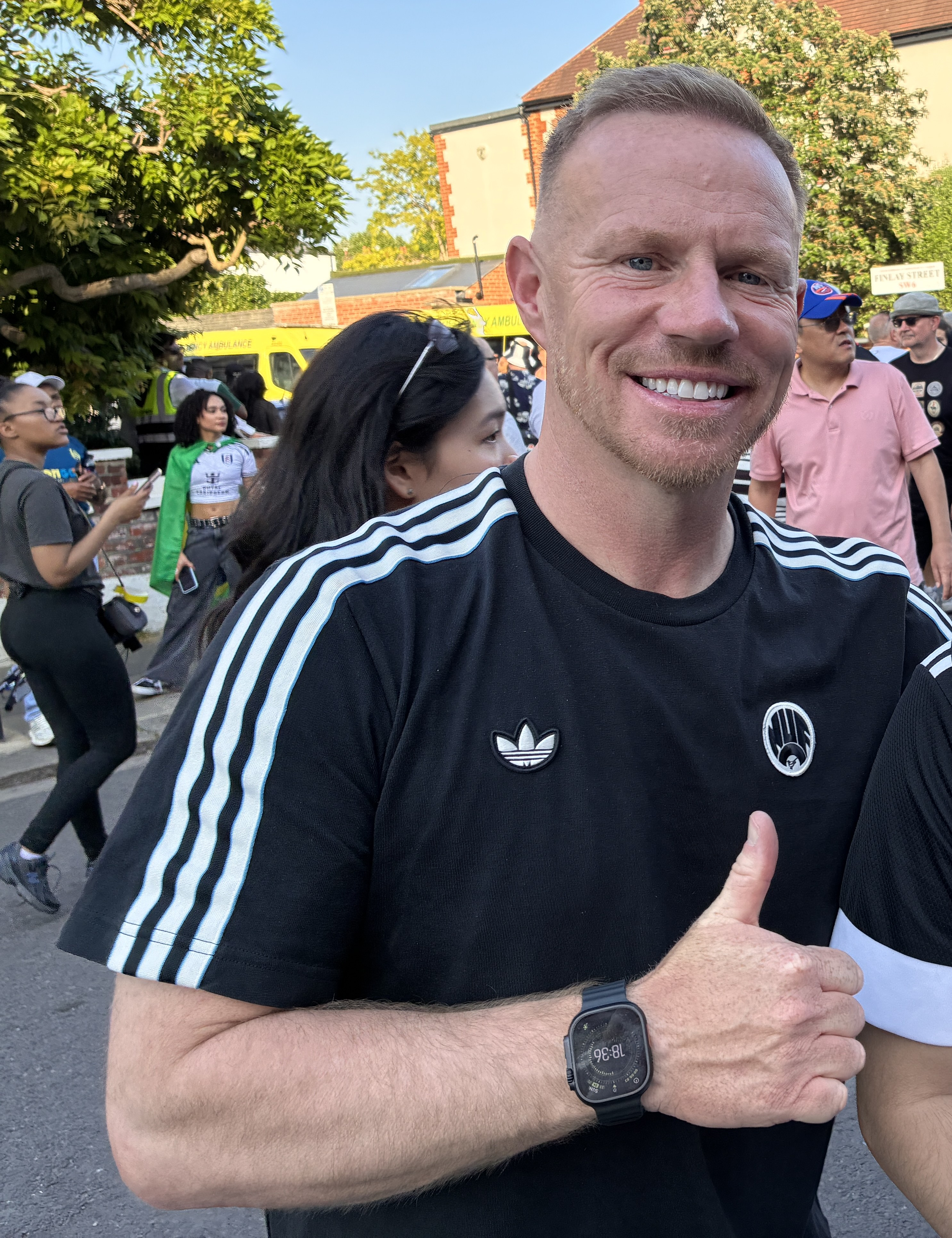
- Weatherstone in 2026

Personal information
- Date of birth: 26 January 1980 (age 46)
- Place of birth: England
- Position: Midfielder

Youth career
- 1996: Oxford United

Senior career*
Years	Team	Apps	(Gls)
1996–2001	Oxford United	61	(11)
2001–2004	Boston United	109	(38)
2004	Yeovil Town	21	(3)
2004	Hornchurch	11	(6)
2004–2006	Stevenage Borough	56	(8)
2006–2008	Weymouth	70	(17)
2008–2009	Crawley Town	39	(11)
2009–2011	Eastbourne Borough	63	(14)

International career
2002–2003	England C	3	(2)

Managerial career
- 2011–2014: Burnley (U23s manager)
- 2014–2021: AFC Bournemouth (first team coach)
- 2021–2026: Newcastle United (first team coach)
- * Club domestic league appearances and goals

Simon Reuben Leo Weatherstone (born 26 January 1980). A former English footballer. Weatherstone had a 15-year playing career and when he finished playing he studied for his coaching badges, where he attained his Pro License in 2020.

During his coaching career, he coached at Burnley, serving as Head Coach of the U23 side.

At the end of the 2013/14 season, Simon was offered the position of First Team Coach at AFC Bournemouth. The following season, AFC Bournemouth went on to win the EFL Championship, and he spent five years in the Premier League in the First Team Coach role. During the summer of 2021, Simon left his post at AFC Bournemouth.

On 8 November 2021, Weatherstone joined Eddie Howe's backroom staff at Newcastle United, again as First Team Coach.

Weatherstone started his playing career at Oxford United, where he made his professional debut in Division 1, now known as the Championship, in 1997. Simon scored his first professional goal vs. Nottingham Forest at the City Ground in 1998. In February 2001, Simon was transferred to Boston United on 16 February 2001, along with his brother Ross Weatherstone, in the same deal.

The Weatherstones played a pivotal role in getting Boston United promoted to the Football League, winning the Conference National title in 2002. He scored at Hayes United on the last game of the 2001/02 season, helping the club to be promoted. Simon went on to play a significant role during Boston United's time within the EFL.

During this period, Simon earned the honour to represent his country, where he played for England national C team. He earned three caps and scored two goals.

On 23 January 2004, Yeovil Town bought Simon for £60,000. During the 2004/05 season, he made several appearances for Yeovil, where they were promoted to the third tier of the EFL. Later that season, Simon signed for Hornchurch, but ended the season at Stevenage Borough.

Simon played for Stevenage over the 2004/05 and 2005/06 seasons. Weatherstone played in the 2005 Conference National play-off final for Stevenage, which saw them lose the game 1-0 to Carlisle United.

In July 2006, Weatherstone signed for Weymouth. He played for the club during the 2006/07 and 2007/08 seasons. Weatherstone became club captain during this time. He scored one of his best goals when playing for Weymouth, against his future club Crawley Town, netting a half-volley from 40 yards out.

Crawley Town signed Weatherstone ahead of the 2008/09 season. He scored some important goals for the side during the season.

Weatherstone's last playing club was Eastbourne Borough in the Conference National. Simon scored his final career goal in the 84th minute, during the last day of the 2009/10 season. This goal kept Eastbourne in the Conference National, against the team where he started his career, Oxford United.
