= Rob Folland =

Welsh footballer

Personal information
- Full name: Robert Folland
- Date of birth: 16 September 1979 (age 47)
- Place of birth: Swansea, Wales
- Position: Forward

Senior career*
Years	Team	Apps	(Gls)
1997–2002	Oxford United	40	(2)
- * Club domestic league appearances and goals

Robert Folland (born 16 September 1979) is a Welsh former footballer who played in the English Football League for Oxford United.
