= Phil Gilchrist =

English footballer (born 1973)

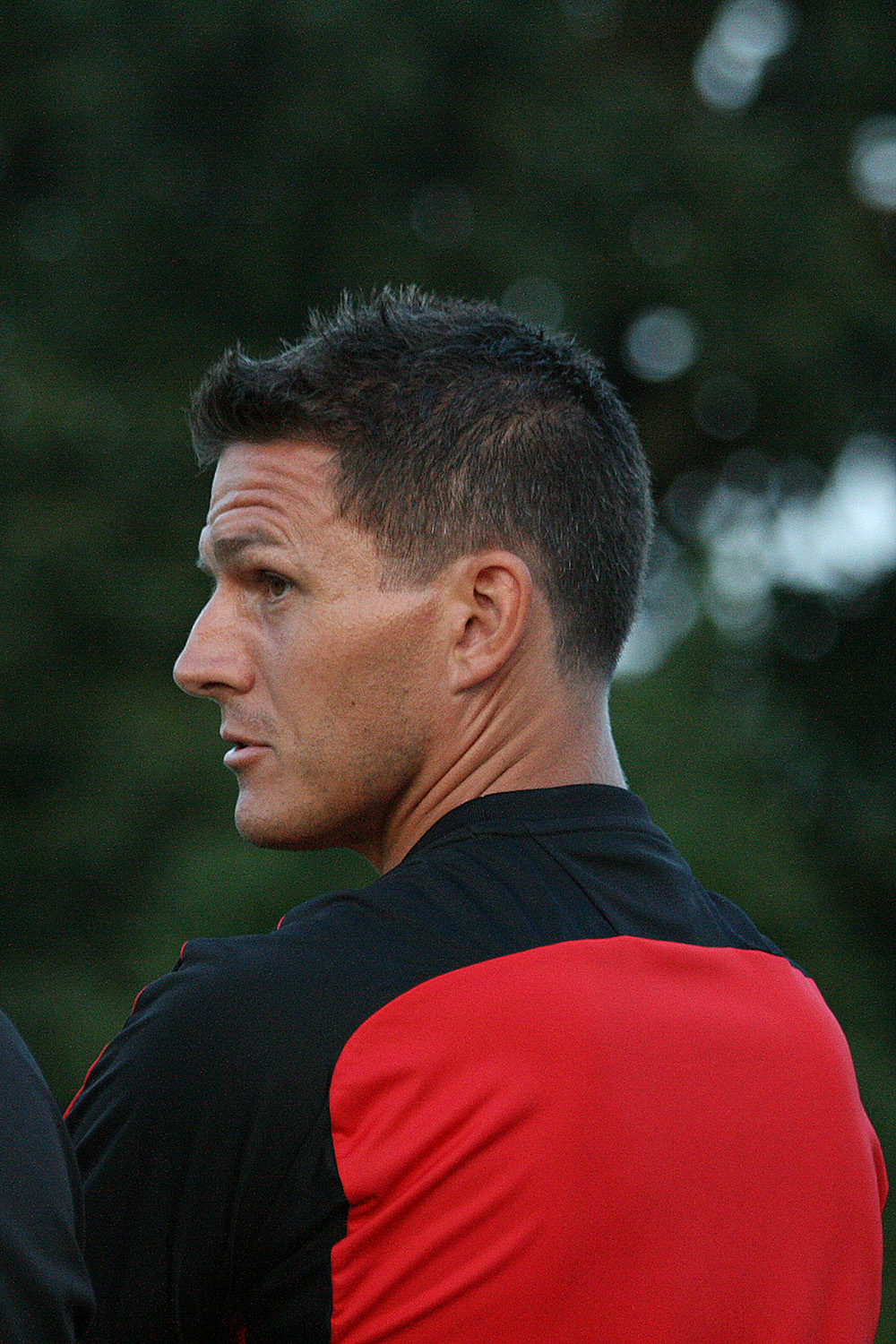
- Gilchrist on the sidelines for Woking

Personal information
- Full name: Philip Alexander Gilchrist
- Date of birth: 25 August 1973 (age 53)
- Place of birth: Stockton-on-Tees, England
- Position: Centre back

Senior career*
Years	Team	Apps	(Gls)
1990–1992	Nottingham Forest	0	(0)
1992	Middlesbrough	0	(0)
1992–1995	Hartlepool United	82	(0)
1995–1999	Oxford United	177	(10)
1999–2001	Leicester City	39	(1)
2001–2004	West Bromwich Albion	90	(0)
2004	→ Rotherham United (loan)	10	(0)
2004–2006	Rotherham United	35	(1)
2006–2007	Oxford United	36	(1)
2008–2009	Woking	0	(0)
2009	Quorn		
Total		479	(13)

Managerial career
- 2008–2009: Woking
- * Club domestic league appearances and goals

Philip Alexander Gilchrist (born 25 August 1973) is an English former footballer and manager. He played as a defender.

== Career ==
Gilchrist first joined Oxford United from Hartlepool United for £100,000 in February 1995. He soon formed one of the best defensive partnerships ever seen at The Manor Ground, alongside Matt Elliott, and it was this partnership that formed the basis for the promotion winning side of 1995–96.

Predominantly left sided, Gilchrist continued to flourish after the sale of Elliott, and moved on to Leicester for £500,000 in 1999. In total he had made 201 starts for the U's in his first spell, scoring eleven goals.

Gilchrist was an unused substitute as Leicester won the 2000 Football League Cup final. He made 23 Premier League starts for Leicester, scoring once in a 2–0 win over Liverpool at Anfield, before moving on to West Bromwich Albion for £500,000 in March 2001. He made his debut for Albion in a 2–1 win over Tranmere Rovers on 25 March 2001. He was a regular during 2001–02, forming part of a solid defence which notched up a club record 27 clean sheets and helping Albion win promotion to the Premiership. In all, Gilchrist made over 100 appearances for Albion in all competitions.

Three years later he joined Rotherham United, initially on a month's loan. Gilchrist made his debut for the Millers in a 1–0 defeat away at Derby County on 13 March 2004. The success of his loan spell led to a permanent move. He scored his first and only goal for the club in a 2–1 loss to Burnley in March 2005. Rotherham released Gilchrist in May 2006.

Gilchrist returned to Oxford in June 2006 for his second spell at the club, and was made club captain (with Barry Quinn as team captain). Gilchrist announced his retirement from football on 6 December 2007.

However, in May 2008, he was appointed as assistant-manager at Conference National club Woking, where it was shortly after announced he would be registered as a player. In September 2008 it was announced that following the departure of Kim Grant as manager, Gilchrist and Andy Cook were to be placed in temporary charge of Woking. On 23 September 2008, he was confirmed as the permanent manager until the end of the season. However, Woking sacked him on 2 April 2009.

Following his departure from Woking, Gilchrist studies at Loughborough University before taking a post-graduate course at Buckingham university. He later found employment at Ratcliffe College.

== Honours ==
Leicester City

- Football League Cup: 1999–2000
