= Matt Murphy (English footballer) =

English footballer

Personal information
- Full name: Matthew Murphy
- Date of birth: 20 August 1971 (age 55)
- Place of birth: Northampton, England
- Positions: Forward; midfielder

Senior career*
Years	Team	Apps	(Gls)
- Long Buckby
- Cogenhoe United
- Irthlingborough Diamonds
–1993	Corby Town		
1993–2001	Oxford United	246	(38)
1997–1998	→ Scunthorpe United (loan)	3	(0)
2001–2002	Bury	9	(0)
2002–2003	Swansea City	12	(2)
2003	Kettering Town		
2003	King's Lynn		
2003–2004	Ford Sports		
2004–2005	Slough Town	41	(25)
2005–2007	Brackley Town		
2007–2008	Banbury United		
2008	Spalding United		
2008	Wellingborough Town		
2008–2009	Sileby		
2009–	Daventry United		
- * Club domestic league appearances and goals

Matt Murphy (born 20 August 1971) is an English former footballer who played 270 games in the Football League. In February 2009 he was appointed player/assistant manager of United Counties League club Daventry United.

== Club career ==
Murphy started his career in non-league football with Long Buckby, Cogenhoe United, Irthlingborough Diamonds and Corby Town, before joining Oxford United for a fee of £20,000. He played nearly 250 league games for Oxford, and spent time with Scunthorpe United, Bury and Swansea City before returning to non-league. He has since played for Kettering Town, King's Lynn, Ford Sports, Slough Town, Brackley Town, Banbury United, Spalding United, Wellingborough Town, Sileby, and Daventry United.
