= Joey Beauchamp =

English footballer (1971–2022)

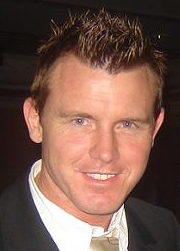

Personal information
- Full name: Joseph Daniel Beauchamp
- Date of birth: 13 March 1971
- Place of birth: Oxford, England
- Date of death: 19 February 2022 (aged 50)
- Place of death: Kidlington, England
- Height: 5 ft 10 in (1.78 m)
- Position: Midfielder

Youth career
- Summertown Stars
- Oxford United

Senior career*
Years	Team	Apps	(Gls)
1989–1994	Oxford United	124	(20)
1991	→ Swansea City (loan)	5	(2)
1994	West Ham United	0	(0)
1994–1995	Swindon Town	45	(3)
1995–2002	Oxford United	238	(43)
2004	Abingdon Town		
2004–2005	Didcot Town	9	(1)
2005–2007	Abingdon Town	8	(1)
- * Club domestic league appearances and goals

Joseph Daniel Beauchamp (/ˈbiːtʃəm/ BEE-chəm, 13 March 1971 – 19 February 2022) was an English professional footballer who played as a left midfielder. He played for most of his career at Oxford United but also had spells with West Ham United and Swindon Town as well as a short loan spell at Swansea City before moving into the lower leagues.

== Playing career ==
=== Oxford United ===
Beauchamp was born in Oxford and played for Summertown Stars boys team. He began his career with Oxford United as a youth-team player, living with his parents and two brothers in North Oxford. Beauchamp made 124 appearances for the club in his first spell in the yellow shirt, during which time he also made five appearances on loan at Swansea City.

=== West Ham United ===
Beauchamp was sold to Premier League side West Ham United in June 1994 for a fee of £1 million. He failed to settle and never played a competitive game for the Hammers, finding commuting from Oxford onerous and being unwilling to move to London. West Ham's manager at the time, Harry Redknapp, blamed the signing of Beauchamp for the departure of previous manager Billy Bonds. At the time, Bonds referred to Beauchamp as a wimp and Redknapp said he saw Beauchamp crying in his car on his first day of training. In his autobiography, Redknapp wrote: "Beauchamp turned up late, made no effort on the pitch and it was the final straw for Bill." Beauchamp said that he did not want the transfer but felt pressured by Oxford United as the club needed the money for wages and to prevent them from being in financial trouble.

Two months later Beauchamp was signed by Swindon Town manager John Gorman for a club-record combined fee of £850,000, which included defender Adrian Whitbread going in the opposite direction. Whitbread was valued at £750,000 in the deal. Harry Redknapp described Beauchamp's departure as "it was like a black cloud had been lifted".

=== Swindon Town ===
Beauchamp made his Swindon debut as a substitute in the second First Division game of 1994–95 and played more than 50 times in his first season. At the end of the season Swindon were relegated for the second season in succession. Manager Gorman had been replaced by Steve McMahon and Beauchamp fell out of favour, playing only four times (three as a substitute, one against Oxford) in the 1995–96 season before being sold back to his home-town club. In his fifteen-month stay with the Robins he made 60 appearances, scoring 4 goals in total.

=== Back to Oxford ===
Beauchamp returned to Oxford in the autumn of 1995. The deal was described as being "worth £300,000" to the club, though Swindon only received £75,000 (the rest was the saving of his wages for the remainder of his contract). Beauchamp scored against Swindon in Oxford's 3–0 victory the following March. In September 1999 he scored the goal which knocked Premier League side Everton out of the 1999–2000 Football League Cup 2–1 on aggregate.

He made a further 238 appearances in the yellow and blue, making him one of the club's longest-serving players. His goal against Blackpool in March 1996 was voted the greatest Oxford United goal by fans in 1999; he was also voted United's player of the 1990s.

=== Professional retirement ===
His professional career came to an end when he sustained several recurring injuries in 2002 that forced him to retire. He scored in his final game for the club, a 2–1 loss to Exeter City.

He then joined local part-timers Abingdon Town in 2004, where he played alongside his brother, Luke. In December 2004, Beauchamp signed for Didcot Town, before returning to Abingdon in July 2005. Following his second spell at Abingdon, Beauchamp joined Oxford Sunday League side Oxford Yellows in November 2006. He later played for Bletchingdon Reserves in the Oxford Sunday League.

=== After football ===
After his football career ended, Beauchamp became a professional gambler before finding work as a bookmaker. He battled with alcoholism and was convicted of drink-driving in 2009. He had depression for which he sought help from the charity Sporting Chance. In 2010, Beauchamp said that his battle with drink and depression had made him consider suicide. He was sectioned in 2020 after a suicide attempt.

== Death ==
Beauchamp died on 19 February 2022, at the age of 50. At the time of his death, he was tenth and fifth respectively in Oxford United's all-time lists having made 428 appearances and scored 80 goals for the club. The cause of death was suicide by hanging. In July 2022, following his death, a bar at Oxford Stadium was named after him.
