= A420 derby =

Rivalry between English association football clubs

- Location: Southern England
- Teams: Oxford United; Swindon Town
- First meeting: Swindon Town 0–0 Oxford United (21 August 1965) (1965–66 Third Division)
- Latest meeting: Swindon Town 1–2 Oxford United (9 March 2021) (2020–21 League One)
- Stadiums: Kassam Stadium (Oxford United); County Ground (Swindon Town)

Statistics
- Total meetings: 62
- Most wins: Swindon Town (25)
- Most player appearances: John Trollope (25)
- Top scorer: Steve White (6)
- All-time record: Swindon Town: 25; Draw: 20; Oxford United: 17

The A420 derby is a football match played between Oxford United and Swindon Town. It takes its name from A420 road, a primary road between both cities, which are only 30 miles (48 km) apart.

Although the clubs played friendly matches throughout the 1950s, the rivalry began when Oxford United replaced the bankrupt Accrington Stanley in the Football League. The rivalry was at its peak in the 1970s since both the teams were in the same divisions for the majority of the decade.

Occasionally, the derby has been marred by violence, especially during the 1970s, when football hooliganism was at its peak. The most notable incident occurred on 4 May 1982, when a smoke bomb was thrown onto the pitch by a Swindon Town fan with the score tied at 2–2. The match referee in confusion continued the game on a foggy pitch and Swindon scored the winning goal, the match ending 3–2 in Swindon's favour. After the final whistle, the referee was struck by a coin thrown by an Oxford fan and chaos ensued.

The teams have played 62 matches in all competitions, Swindon winning 24, Oxford 17 and remaining 21 having been drawn. Even though Swindon have won more derby matches than Oxford, the latter have an unbeaten streak of 18 years, spanning from 2002 to 2020.

== Head-to-head ==
=== Statistics ===
As of 26 April 2024

Competition	Oxford United wins	Draws	Swindon Town wins	Oxford United goals	Swindon Town goals
League	13	19	22	53	69
FA Cup	1	0	0	1	0
League Cup	1	0	0	1	0
Football League Trophy	2	1	1	4	3
Anglo-Italian Cup	0	0	1	1	3
Total	17	20	24	60	75

=== List of matches ===
As of 26 April 2024

#	Season	Date	Competition	Stadium	Home Team	Result	Away Team	Attendance	H2H
1	1965–66	21 August 1965	Division 3	County Ground	Swindon	0–0	Oxford	20,596	0
2	1965–66	29 January 1966	Division 3	Manor Ground	Oxford	0–3	Swindon	16,174	+1
3	1966–67	10 December 1966	Division 3	Manor Ground	Oxford	0–0	Swindon	10,117	+1
4	1966–67	6 May 1967	Division 3	County Ground	Swindon	3–0	Oxford	14,156	+2
5	1967–68	12 April 1968	Division 3	Manor Ground	Oxford	0–0	Swindon	18,012	+2
6	1967–68	16 April 1968	Division 3	County Ground	Swindon	1–1	Oxford	16,588	+2
7	1969–70	13 September 1969	Division 2	County Ground	Swindon	0–0	Oxford	–	+2
8	1969–70	24 September 1969	League Cup	Manor Ground	Oxford	1–0	Swindon	–	+1
9	1969–70	13 December 1969	Division 2	Manor Ground	Oxford	0–0	Swindon	–	+1
10	1970–71	21 November 1970	Division 2	Manor Ground	Oxford	0–0	Swindon	–	+1
11	1970–71	20 February 1971	Division 2	County Ground	Swindon	3–0	Oxford	–	+2
12	1971–72	6 November 1971	Division 2	Manor Ground	Oxford	1–1	Swindon	–	+2
13	1971–72	26 February 1972	Division 2	County Ground	Swindon	4–0	Oxford	–	+3
14	1972–73	16 December 1972	Division 2	Manor Ground	Oxford	1–0	Swindon	–	+2
15	1972–73	24 February 1973	Division 2	County Ground	Swindon	1–3	Oxford	–	+1
16	1973–74	20 October 1973	Division 2	County Ground	Swindon	1–0	Oxford	–	+2
17	1973–74	17 March 1974	Division 2	Manor Ground	Oxford	1–1	Swindon	–	+2
18	1976–77	27 December 1976	Division 3	County Ground	Swindon	1–0	Oxford	–	+3
19	1976–77	8 April 1977	Division 3	Manor Ground	Oxford	0–0	Swindon	–	+3
20	1977–78	26 December 1977	Division 3	Manor Ground	Oxford	3–3	Swindon	–	+3
21	1977–78	27 March 1978	Division 3	County Ground	Swindon	3–2	Oxford	–	+4
22	1978–79	16 April 1979	Division 3	Manor Ground	Oxford	0–1	Swindon	–	+5
23	1978–79	2 May 1979	Division 3	County Ground	Swindon	2–0	Oxford	–	+6
24	1979–80	6 February 1980	Division 3	Manor Ground	Oxford	2–2	Swindon	7,558	+6
25	1979–80	7 April 1980	Division 3	County Ground	Swindon	1–1	Oxford	10,342	+6
26	1980–81	16 September 1980	Division 3	County Ground	Swindon	1–0	Oxford	7,709	+7
27	1980–81	1 October 1980	Division 3	Manor Ground	Oxford	0–0	Swindon	6,071	+7
28	1981–82	7 April 1982	Division 3	Manor Ground	Oxford	5–0	Swindon	7,354	+6
29	1981–82	4 May 1982	Division 3	County Ground	Swindon	3–2	Oxford	7,880	+7
30	1983–84	22 February 1984	League Trophy	Manor Ground	Oxford	1–0	Swindon	4,774	+6
31	1988–89	5 October 1988	Division 2	Manor Ground	Oxford	1–1	Swindon	9,398	+6
32	1988–89	5 February 1989	Division 2	County Ground	Swindon	3–0	Oxford	10,227	+7
33	1989–90	17 October 1989	Division 2	County Ground	Swindon	3–0	Oxford	10,741	+8
34	1989–90	24 March 1990	Division 2	Manor Ground	Oxford	2–2	Swindon	8,382	+8
35	1990–91	22 September 1990	Division 2	Manor Ground	Oxford	2–4	Swindon	7,961	+9
36	1990–91	5 March 1991	Division 2	County Ground	Swindon	0–0	Oxford	9,058	+9
37	1991–92	1 October 1991	Full Members' Cup	County Ground	Swindon	3–3	Oxford	5,868	+9
38	1991–92	28 January 1992	Division 2	County Ground	Swindon	2–1	Oxford	8,926	+10
39	1991–92	7 March 1992	Division 2	Manor Ground	Oxford	5–3	Swindon	7,795	+9
40	1992–93	1 September 1992	Anglo-Italian Cup	Manor Ground	Oxford	1–3	Swindon	4,069	+10
41	1992–93	20 September 1992	Division 1	County Ground	Swindon	2–2	Oxford	7,717	+10
42	1992–93	9 January 1993	Division 1	Manor Ground	Oxford	0–1	Swindon	9,146	+11
43	1995–96	30 August 1995	Division 2	County Ground	Swindon	1–1	Oxford	13,556	+11
44	1995–96	19 March 1996	Division 2	Manor Ground	Oxford	3–0	Swindon	8,585	+10
45	1996–97	12 October 1996	Division 1	County Ground	Swindon	1–0	Oxford	11,251	+11
46	1996–97	19 April 1997	Division 1	Manor Ground	Oxford	2–0	Swindon	8,166	+10
47	1997–98	6 December 1997	Division 1	County Ground	Swindon	4–1	Oxford	11,408	+11
48	1997–98	11 April 1998	Division 1	Manor Ground	Oxford	2–1	Swindon	8,066	+10
49	1998–99	9 September 1998	Division 1	County Ground	Swindon	4–1	Oxford	8,305	+11
50	1998–99	13 February 1999	Division 1	Manor Ground	Oxford	2–0	Swindon	8,179	+10
51	2000–01	8 October 2000	Division 2	County Ground	Swindon	2–1	Oxford	7,975	+11
52	2000–01	10 March 2001	Division 2	Manor Ground	Oxford	0–2	Swindon	7,480	+12
53	2002–03	8 December 2002	FA Cup	Kassam Stadium	Oxford	1–0	Swindon	11,465	+11
54	2011–12	21 August 2011	League Two	County Ground	Swindon	1–2	Oxford	12,113	+10
55	2011–12	3 March 2012	League Two	Kassam Stadium	Oxford	2–0	Swindon	11,825	+9
56	2012–13	5 September 2012	League Trophy	Kassam Stadium	Oxford	1–0	Swindon	11,465	+8
57	2015–16	6 October 2015	League Trophy	Kassam Stadium	Oxford	2–0	Swindon	9,013	+7
58	2016–17	10 September 2016	League One	Kassam Stadium	Oxford	2–0	Swindon	11,042	+6
59	2016–17	4 October 2016	League Trophy	County Ground	Swindon	0–0	Oxford	2,698	+6
60	2016–17	5 February 2017	League One	County Ground	Swindon	1–2	Oxford	10,658	+5
61	2020–21	28 November 2020	League One	Kassam Stadium	Oxford	1–2	Swindon	0 (Note: Played behind closed doors due to COVID-19 restrictions.)	+6
62	2020–21	9 March 2021	League One	County Ground	Swindon	1–2	Oxford	0 (Note: Played behind closed doors due to COVID-19 restrictions.)	+5

== Statistics ==
=== Records ===
Comparative chart of yearly table positions of Oxford United and Swindon Town in the league.

- Widest winning margin: 5 goals – Oxford United 5–0 Swindon Town (7 April 1982, 1981–82 Third Division)
- Highest scoring match: 8 goals – Oxford United 5–3 Swindon Town (7 March 1992, 1991–92 Second Division)
- Longest winning streak: 6 matches – Oxford United (8 December 2002 – 10 September 2016)
- Longest unbeaten streak: 12 matches – Swindon Town (20 October 1973 – 1 October 1980)
- Highest attendance:
  - Swindon Town: 20,596 – Swindon Town 0–0 Oxford United (21 August 1965, 1965–66 Third Division)
  - Oxford United: 18,012 – Oxford United 0–0 Swindon Town (12 April 1968, 1967–68 Third Division)

=== Goal scoring ===
Nation	Player	Club(s)	Goals	Years
(England)	Steve White	Swindon Town	6	1986–1994
(England)	Peter Foley	Oxford United	5	1974–1983
(England)	Roy Carter	Swindon Town	4	1977–1983
(England)	David Moss	Swindon Town	4; 0	1971–1978; 1985–1986
(England)	Arthur Horsfield	Swindon Town	3	1969–1972
(England)	Joey Beauchamp	Oxford United; Swindon Town; Oxford United	3; 0; 0	1989–1994; 1994–1995; 1995–2002
(England)	George Ndah	Swindon Town	3	1997–1999
(Northern Ireland)	Jim Magilton	Oxford United	3	1990–1994

=== Appearances ===
Nation	Player	Club(s)	Apps.	Years
(England)	John Trollope	Swindon Town	25	1986–1994
(England)	Colin Clarke	Oxford United	16	1965–1978
(England)	Joey Beauchamp	Oxford United; Swindon Town; Oxford United	15; 0; 0	1989–1994; 1994–1995; 1995–2002
(England)	John Shuker	Oxford United	15	1962–1977
(Scotland)	Jimmy Allan	Swindon Town	14	1971–1984
(England)	Joe Butler	Swindon Town	14	1965–1976
(England)	Fraser Digby	Swindon Town	14	1986–1998
(England)	Don Rogers	Swindon Town	14	1962–1972; 1976–1977
(England)	Graham Atkinson	Oxford United	14	1962–1974

== Crossing the divide ==
List of players that played for both teams.

Player	Oxford United career			Swindon Town career		
Player	Span	League apps	League goals	Span	League apps	League goals
(England) Owen Medlock	1959–1963	110	0	1959	3	0
(England) Ken Skeen	1967–1974	270	40	1964–1967	14	4
(England) Jim Barron	1966–1970	152	0	1974–1977	79	0
(England) Mark Jones	1979–1986	129	7	1986–1990	40	9
(England) Alan Judge	1984–1991; 2003–2004	80; 2	0; 0	2002–2003	0	0
(England) Joey Beauchamp	1989–1994; 1995–2002	124; 238	20; 43	1994–1995	45	3
(England) Kevin Dearden	1989	0	0	1990	1	0
(England) Adi Viveash	2002–2003	11	0	1989–1995; 2003–2004	54; 15	3; 0
(England) Marcus Phillips	1997	1	0	1992–1995	0	0
(Wales) Sam Ricketts	2000–2003	45	1	2015	9	0
(France) Éric Sabin	2005–2006	29	7	2001–2003	73	9
(Republic of Ireland) Dominic Foley	2003	6	0	2002	7	1
(England) Brian Howard	2014	7	0	2003–2005	70	9
(England) Tommy Mooney	2004–2005	45	19	2003–2004	42	15
(England) Lee Holmes	2012	7	0	2004–2005; 2012	15; 10	1; 1
(England) Patrick Collins	2007–2008	2	0	2005	13	0
(England) Jamie Slabber	2006	3	0	2005	9	0
(England) Alex Rhodes	2009	4	0	2006	4	0
(Wales) Paul Evans	2008–2009	3	0	2006–2007	15	3
(England) Danny Rose	2007; 2007–2008; 2007–2008	22; 19; 82	1; 0; 6	2019–2020	29	1
(England) Ben Purkiss	2010–2012	23	0	2017–2018	41	0
(France) Mehdi Kerrouche	2012	4	0	2011–2012	13	6
(Colombia) Cristian Montaño	2012	9	2	2011	4	1
(England) Jonathan Obika	2017–2019	46	8	2011	5	0
(England) Daniel Boateng	2012	2	0	2012–2013	2	0
(England) Lee Cox	2012–2013	14	0	2012–2014	12	1
(England) Canice Carroll	2015–2018	16	1	2019	17	1
(England) Wes Thomas	2016–2018	50	13	2015–2016	6	2
(France) Jérémy Balmy	2015	0	0	2015–2016	12	0
(England) Jack Payne	2018–2019	28	3	2020–2022	78	17
