= Darren Patterson =

Northern Irish footballer and manager

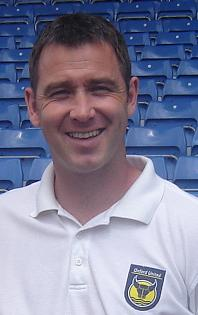
- Patterson with Oxford United

Personal information
- Full name: Darren James Patterson
- Date of birth: 15 October 1969 (age 57)
- Place of birth: Belfast, Northern Ireland
- Height: 6 ft 1 in (1.85 m)
- Position: Defender

Senior career*
Years	Team	Apps	(Gls)
1988–1989	West Bromwich Albion	0	(0)
1989–1992	Wigan Athletic	97	(6)
1992–1995	Crystal Palace	22	(1)
1995–1998	Luton Town	57	(0)
1996	→ Preston North End (loan)	2	(0)
1998–2000	Dundee United	30	(0)
2000–2001	York City	6	(0)
2001–2002	Oxford United	20	(1)
Total		234	(8)

International career
1994	Northern Ireland U21	1	(0)
	Northern Ireland B	3	(0)
1994–1999	Northern Ireland	17	(1)

Managerial career
- 2004: Oxford United (caretaker)
- 2006: Oxford United
- 2007–2008: Oxford United
- 2010–2011: Bristol Rovers (caretaker)
- 2012: Rotherham United (caretaker)
- * Club domestic league appearances and goals

Darren James Patterson (born 15 October 1969) is a Northern Irish football manager and former professional footballer.

As a player he was a defender, notably playing in the Premier League for Crystal Palace and in the Scottish Premier League for Dundee United. Most of his appearances however came in the Football League with spells at Wigan Athletic and Luton Town. He also played professionally for Preston North End, York City and Oxford United. He was capped by Northern Ireland on 17 occasions, scoring one goal.

Following retirement from playing, he switched to coaching and rejoined Oxford United where after a caretaker spell in charge he had two separate stints as first team manager. He later joined the coaching staff at Bristol Rovers where he also had a spell as the clubs interim first team manager. In 2011, he became Rotherham United's assistant manager again having a brief spell in temporary charge.

== Club career ==
Patterson began his playing career with West Bromwich Albion around the time of their relegation from the First Division in 1986, but failed to make a first-team appearance and was signed by Bryan Hamilton for Wigan Athletic early in the 1989–90 season.

Patterson proved a success in defence for Wigan, making 57 Third Division appearances and scored five goals before being transferred to Crystal Palace at the end of the 1991–92 season. Patterson enjoyed a longer spell at Palace and played for the club in the FA Premier League before joining Luton Town in a £230,000 deal in August 1995. During his time at Selhurst Park, he had seen Palace relegated from the inaugural Premier League in 1992–93, promoted back as Division One champions in 1993–94, and relegated back in 1994–95 at the end of a dramatic season in which Palace also reached the semi-finals of both major domestic cup competitions. He was sent off in the FA Cup semi-final for fighting with Manchester United midfielder Roy Keane.

He made 66 appearances for Luton (and also had a loan spell at Preston North End) before leaving on a Bosman ruling free transfer in the Summer of 1998 to join Dundee United. At Kenilworth Road he endured the disappointment of relegation from Division One in his first season and playoff defeat in Division Two during his second.

Whilst at Dundee United he scored once; his goal coming against Clydebank during United's run to the semi-finals of the 1998–99 Scottish Cup.

He returned south of the border in December 2000 when he signed for Division Three strugglers York City. 14 months later he signed for his final club Oxford United. At Oxford he scored once against Stoke City.

== International career ==
Patterson was capped once by the Northern Ireland national under-21 team, starting in a 0–0 home draw with Romania on 22 March 1994. He played for the Northern Ireland national team, earning 17 caps.

== Managerial and coaching career ==
After retiring from the game Patterson remained at Oxford as youth team coach. He served as caretaker manager of the club following the departure of Graham Rix, although he was ultimately overlooked for the job in favour of Ramón Díaz. He was finally appointed manager of the club on a full-time basis in March 2006 following the departure of Brian Talbot. However, no sooner had Patterson been appointed than he lost the job to Jim Smith following the sale of the club by Firoz Kassam to Nick Merry. Patterson managed the club for only eight days, and in doing so became perhaps the shortest-serving manager in the history of the English league. While Bill Lambton and Tim Ward both had periods in charge of a club that lasted three and seven days respectively, but neither man actually signed a contract to manage the club, whereas Patterson did. Leroy Rosenior later managed an even shorter stint at Torquay United in 2007, being fired only 10 minutes after signing his contract, but Torquay were no longer a League club by that point.

In December 2006, Patterson was offered the vacant manager's job at Brentford; however, caretaker manager Scott Fitzgerald was appointed on a permanent basis after Patterson declined their terms.

After becoming first team coach in April 2007, he was appointed Oxford's manager once again on 9 November 2007 after Jim Smith resigned. He was sacked on 30 November 2008 following a poor start to the 2008–09 season.

In May 2009 Patterson was appointed Head of Youth at League One side Bristol Rovers, looking after all young players from eight to 18 years of age. Following the sacking of Lennie Lawrence he took over as assistant manager to Paul Trollope in May 2010. He was appointed caretaker manager on 15 December following Trollope's sacking and he lasted in this position until 10 January 2011 when Dave Penney was appointed manager. Patterson became the assistant manager of Rotherham United on 10 June 2011. He was appointed as the club's caretaker manager in March 2012, after Andy Scott was sacked. Steve Evans was announced as the new manager of Rotherham on 9 April, hours before Ryan Cresswell scored a last minute winner against Cheltenham Town to ensure Patterson had led the club to four wins in five games during his brief time in charge.

== Managerial statistics ==
As of 9 April 2012.

Team	Nation	From	To	Matches	Won	Drawn	Lost	Win %	Ref
Oxford United (caretaker)	England	14 November 2004	9 December 2004	3	1	0	2	33.3	
Oxford United	England	14 March 2006	22 March 2006	3	1	2	0	33.3	
Oxford United	England	9 November 2007	30 November 2008	59	24	11	24	40.7	
Bristol Rovers (caretaker)	England	15 December 2010	10 January 2011	2	0	0	2	0.0	
Rotherham United (caretaker)	England	19 March 2012	11 April 2012	5	4	0	1	80.0	
Total				72	30	13	28	41.6	
