= Medlock =

Medlock may refer to:

- Medlock (surname)
- River Medlock, a river of Greater Manchester
- 19704 Medlock, an outer main-belt asteroid
- Chorlton-on-Medlock
