= New Oxford United Stadium =

Planned football stadium in Kidlington, England

- Interactive map of New Oxford United Stadium
- Location: The Triangle, Kidlington, Oxfordshire, England
- Coordinates: 51.80553035469939°N 1.278190645198567°W
- Owner: Oxford United F.C.
- Operator: Oxford United F.C.
- Capacity: 16,000
- Public transit: Oxford Parkway

Construction
- Opened: TBD
- Cost: £130m-150m (estimated)
- Architect: AFL Architects

Tenant
- Oxford United (planned)

Website
- oufcstadium.co.uk

The New Oxford United Stadium is a proposed multi-purpose stadium to be built in Kidlington, Oxfordshire. It would become the new home of EFL League One club Oxford United, replacing the club's current home, the Kassam Stadium, where they have played since 2001.

== Planning history ==
=== Stratfield Brake plan ===
Oxford United have been planning to move out of the Kassam Stadium for several years. In 2022, the club made a proposal for a new 18,000-capacity home at Stratfield Brake, near Kidlington. Over the next two months, Oxfordshire County Council consulted locals and received an 80% backing on the project. However, only 38% of respondents local to the proposed site were in favour of the plan. After talks continued into 2023, the club chose to move the project to a preferred adjacent site, known locally as 'the Triangle'.

=== The Triangle plan ===
==== 2023 – Early days ====
On 9 October 2023, the club released mock-up images of what the stadium might look like at the Triangle. The images also came with the news that the project's capacity had dropped to 16,000 spectators and had a completion deadline set for 2026, when the lease at the Kassam Stadium is set to end. Immediate reaction to the new plan were mixed, and three months later the design was changed to better align with public feedback.

==== 2024 – Adapting ====
A planning application was submitted on 15 February 2024, with the hope of being the first "all-electric" stadium in England. This would be achieved through the help of solar panels and a low carbon energy supply. The club's then chairman, Grant Ferguson, announced that the application had to be successful if it was to be ready for 2026. As the expiring lease at the current stadium cannot be extended, if the project is not completed in time, Oxford will have to move elsewhere. The first steps to reaching an agreement were made on 22 April 2024, but less than two months later the club were told the plans needed "more detail". The current plan includes not only the new stadium but a "180-bedroom hotel and 1,000 capacity conference and exhibition centre". As many as 1,000 jobs will be created as a result, whilst the project is hoping to generate approximately £32m annually through tourism.

==== 2025 – Resistance and breakthrough ====
In April 2025, whilst featuring on a podcast hosted by BBC Radio Oxford known as 'The Dub', the club's CEO, Tim Williams, was quoted as saying, "if we don't have a stadium, we don't have a football club". Three months later, on 3 July, an important planning hearing was held as Oxford's future hung in the balance. Ahead of the hearing, the club wrote an open letter to locals to highlight the benefits that the new stadium would bring to the area.

Another hearing with Cherwell District Council was set to be held on 31 July, but this was delayed after a decision was made in mid-July by Natural England to designate a woodland nearby to both the initial and new stadium site as ancient, and therefore protected by law. However, on 25 July, Natural England eventually concluded that the area was, in fact, not ancient woodland as it did not appear any on maps of Oxfordshire from the 18th and 19th centuries.

On 6 August, planners from Cherwell District Council recommended the stadium for approval ahead of the rescheduled hearing the following week. According to BBC News, they were quoted as saying that there were "very special circumstances" to justify the stadium's construction at the Triangle. On 14 August, the new stadium's planning application was approved by Cherwell District Council, after a final hearing that lasted four hours.

Final approval of the club's plans followed in February 2026. A Section 106 agreement required the club to pay at least £5.1m towards local infrastructure projects including improvements at Oxford Parkway station, reopening the Cowley Branch Line (with new stations at Cowley and Littlemore), and investments in bus services and a "mobility hub".

==== 2026 – Threat of a Judicial Review ====
In April 2026, the campaign group Friends of Stratfield Brake (FoSB) officially filed a claim in the High Court seeking a Judicial Review of Cherwell District Council's planning approval, citing non-compliance with Green Belt policy, flawed traffic reports and concerns that nearby woodland might be Ancient Woodland. In July 2026, the High Court ruled that the grounds for granting a Judicial Review were not reasonably arguable and refused permission. FoSB subsequently submitted an Oral Renewal Application which was heard at the Royal Courts of Justice on 24 September 2026, where High Court Judge Mr Justice Johnson upheld the refusal and concluded that the claimant's case was "unarguable", effectively ending the legal challenge in the High Court.

== Transport ==
Oxford Parkway station has been cited by the club as the main transport link for the new stadium. A proposal for a footbridge to connect the two together was not pursued as the traffic marshalling plans for the Oxford Road were deemed safer and more efficient.

East West Rail (EWR) will make the new stadium easily nationally accessible by rail via Milton Keynes Central on the West Coast Main Line. In addition to regular services from London and Oxford via the Chiltern Main Line, EWR will help Oxford United's stated aim of having 90% of fans travel to the Triangle by non-car means.
