= Ian Lenagan =

British businessman

Ian Lenagan (born 1946, Scholes, Wigan) is a business entrepreneur. He was the chairman of Wigan Warriors from 2006 to 2023.

== Early life ==
Born in Scholes, Wigan, Lenagan attended St Patrick's Primary School as a child and gained an appreciation for rugby league, playing for the local amateur club also named St Patrick's.

He was educated at West Park Grammar School in St Helens before eventually moving onto university. Lenagan attended both Manchester and Liverpool universities and graduated with a BSc in Mathematics and a MSc in Magnetohydrodynamics respectively.

== Career ==
=== Workplace Systems ===
In 1985 Lenagan set up his own business, Workplace Systems, in Milton Keynes, to develop and supply software products for workforce management. Following a contract with Asda, the business became expanded across Europe, Australasia, the US and the Middle East. Major retailers known to use Workplace Systems include Argos, Focus, Sports Café, Next and Morrisons. With the success of Workplace Systems, the company was floated on the London Stock Exchange in 2000 under the name Telework Systems PLC to incorporate another company founded by Lenagan in 1981, TeleWare, which focused on the telephony software products market.

A decline in the telephone market saw TeleWare sold off to its management in 2003 and the company change its name to WorkPlace Systems International plc, 49% owned by Ian Lenagan.

In December 2011, Workplace Systems was acquired by a Lloyds Banking Group-backed management buyout, and Lenagan stepped down from his role as chairman, receiving £19m from the buyout.

=== Theatre producer ===
Lenagan is also a successful theatre producer, with over 30 productions to his name. His most recent West End hit is a co-production of One Flew Over the Cuckoo's Nest starring Christian Slater.

=== Rugby league and football clubs ===
Lenagan is a rugby league fan. In July 2005 he took over as chairman and majority shareholder of Harlequins RL, buying 65% of the shares and also taking a place on the board of directors. He also became a major shareholder in Oxford United, who were controlled by long-time friend Nick Merry. In July 2012 he replaced Kelvin Thomas as chairman of the League Two club. Lenagan sold his interest in Oxford United and left the board in 2016 when he was appointed Chairman of the Football League.

In 2007 it was announced after months of speculation that Lenagan would become the new owner of Wigan Warriors rugby league club, his boyhood team. Lenagan bought the club from former JJB Sports magnate and Wigan Athletic chairman Dave Whelan. Lenagan also bought the training facilities at Edge Hall Road, the former stadium of Orrell R.U.F.C. as well as a 50-year lease on the JJB Stadium. Lenagan's first signings for Wigan were George Carmont and Richie Mathers, both from the NRL, and Karl Pryce, who returned to rugby league from rugby union club Gloucester. Lenagan also signed Cameron Phelps and Tim Smith during the 2008 season.

Lenagan ran Wigan Warriors as Chairman for 16 years, changing the club from poorly performing to the leading Super League club and winning 16 trophies over that period - Challenge Cups, Champions, League Leaders & World Club Challenge Winners. The squad compiled by Lenagan, Kris Radlinski and Mike Danson went on to win all 4 trophies in 2024 under Head Coach, Matt Peet, and was awarded the BBC SPOTY Team of the Year.

On 15 July 2023, it was announced that Lenegan would be resigning as Wigan chairman in November 2023, after 16 years at the club. Professor Chris Brookes (Warriors' club doctor) would take over as the new chairman, with Mike Danson the club's new owner.

=== Other businesses ===
In parallel with his football and rugby league business involvements and through his Lenagan Family business interests, Lenagan retained his creative involvement in the software industry since 2018 through Competence Development Ltd. Competence develop and support standard software products for Learning Management and Workforce Competencies and are successful within the Sports Sector and Education Sector.

To further advance their interests in these sectors, the Lenagan Family acquired the Awarding Organisation, Transcend Awards Ltd in 2022. Transcend are focused on creating Ofqual-regulated awards in the leisure & fitness, coaching, activity leadership and alternative education pathways areas. Lenagan became a non-Executive Director in 2024.

== See also ==
- List of Super League rugby league club owners
- List of owners of English football clubs
