= Kassam Stadium =

Football stadium in Oxford, United Kingdom

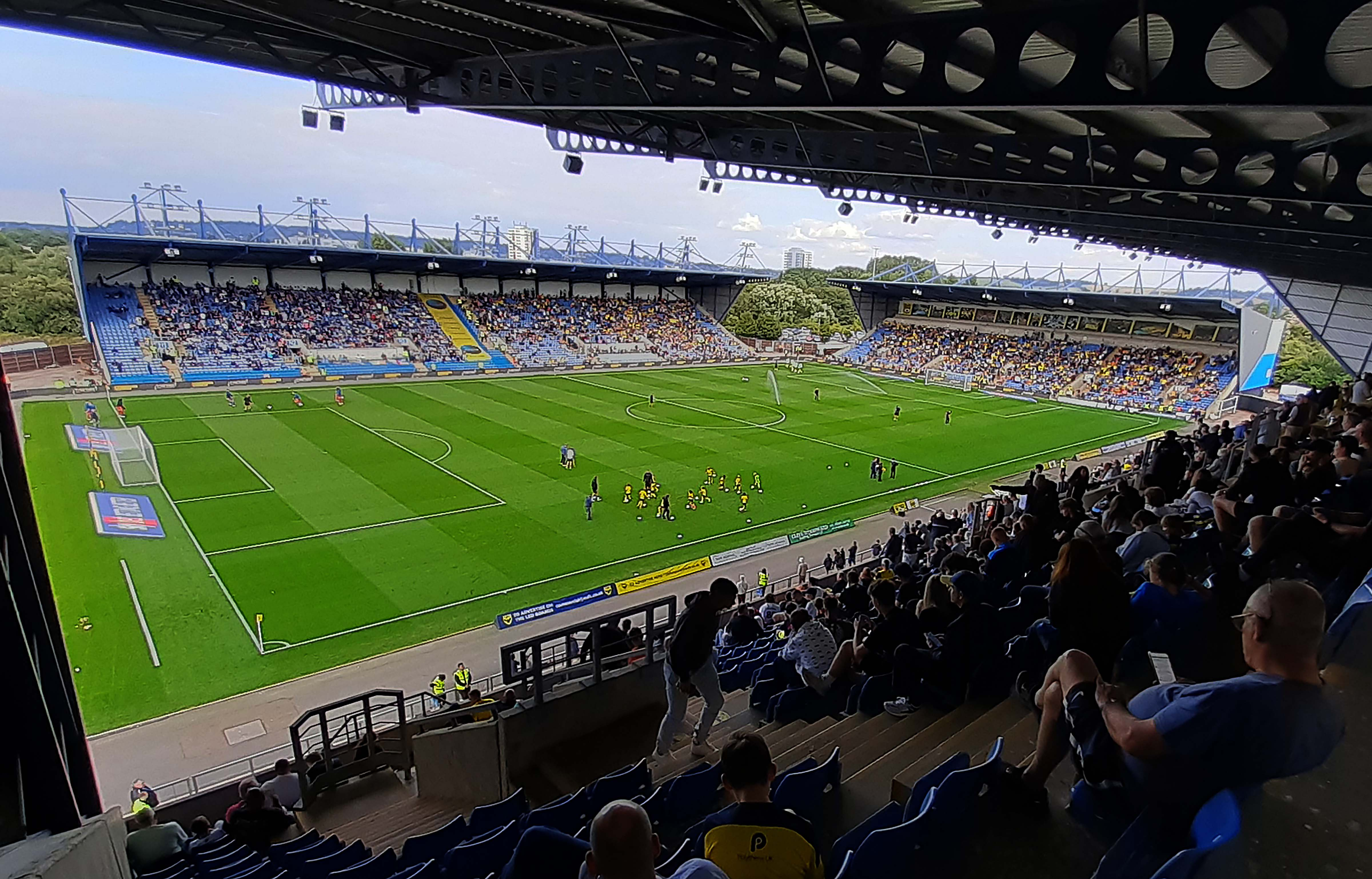
- Interactive map of Kassam Stadium
- Full name: Kassam Stadium
- Location: Grenoble Road, Littlemore, Oxford, England, OX4 4XP
- Coordinates: 51°42′59″N 1°12′29″W
- Owner: Firoka Group
- Operator: Oxford United F.C.
- Capacity: 12,500
- Surface: Grass
- Field size: 112 × 78 yards

Construction
- Built: 1997
- Opened: 2001
- Cost: £15m
- Architect: ACP Architecture Ltd

Tenants
- Oxford United (2001–present); London Welsh (2012–2015)

Website
- www.thekassamstadium.com

The Kassam Stadium (also known as Grenoble Road) is a football stadium in Oxford, England. It is the home of Oxford United Football Club, and is named after the ground's owner and former chairman of the football club, Firoz Kassam.

The Kassam Stadium was built whilst Oxford United played in Division Two (third tier); however, Oxford were relegated to Division Three (fourth tier) the season before the new stadium was built and were further relegated to the Conference National (fifth tier) in 2005–06. The club was previously based at The Manor Ground from 1925 until the opening of the Kassam Stadium in 2001. Following Oxford's promotion from League One at the end of the 2023–24 season, the stadium hosted Championship (second-tier) games for the first time in its history in the 2024–25 season.

== Construction ==
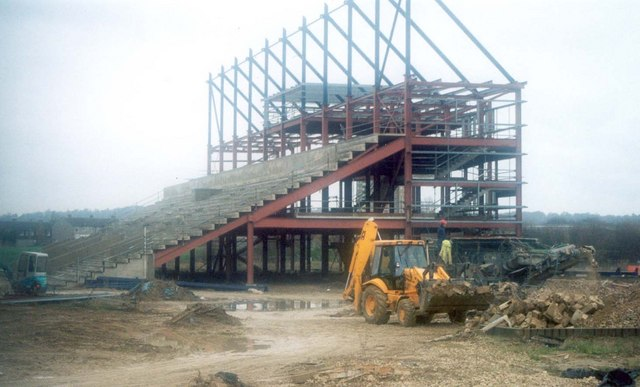
The East Stand under construction in November 2000

On 7 June 1995, directors of Oxford United Football Club announced that the cramped and outdated Manor Ground would be replaced by a new 16,000-seat stadium, situated in the Blackbird Leys area of the city, by the end of the decade.

Construction of the new stadium was begun in the summer of 1996 by Taylor Woodrow, but was suspended in December 1996 after financial problems meant the contractors weren't paid. Oxford United originally denied there was an issue with finance and contractors were on an extended Christmas break and continued with plans for the final game of the 1996–97 season being the farewell to The Manor Ground.

The stadium was originally known by its location, Minchery Farm. At this time, United's chairman was Robin Herd, and the club's chief executive was Keith Cox.

Ongoing money problems meant that no further work was done on the site until February 2000. This followed Firoz Kassam's purchase of the club in April 1999, and then many legal problems involving Oxford City Council, Nick Pentith, Thames Water, Morrells of Oxford, and local landowner Les Wells. By this time, the contractors had changed to Birse Construction, with Taylor Woodrow having had their debt settled by a Company Voluntary Arrangement, by which Firoz Kassam reduced most of the football club's unsecured debt by 90 per cent.

Oxford's fortunes on the pitch changed dramatically during this period of financial uncertainty, hardly helped by having to sell some of their best players in order to stay afloat. After winning promotion to Division One in 1996, they secured two mid-table finishes before being relegated back to Division Two in 1999 and falling into Division Three two years later – meaning that they would be a bottom division club in the 2001–02 season for the first time in more than 30 years.

== Opening and recent history ==
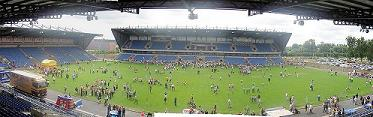
Panoramic view of the Kassam Stadium

The stadium is officially owned by one of Kassam's Firoka Group companies, and hosted its first football match on 4 August 2001. The game was a friendly match against Crystal Palace, which Oxford won on penalties following a 1–1 draw, and Paul Powell scored the club's first goal at the ground. The first competitive match at the ground took place one week later, on 11 August, against Rochdale, in the Football League Third Division (now Football League Two). United lost this match 2–1 in front of a crowd of 7,842 people; Jamie Brooks scored for Oxford. Since then, the ground has hosted rugby union games, as well as an under-17 International football tournament in 2002.

In March 2006, the Oxford United Supporters' Trust unofficially renamed the ground "The United Stadium" and urged fans to use this name, which they claimed signified the crisis at the club, with the chairman failing to choose the right option to take the club forward, and which also symbolised the unity of the fans. Despite the unofficial renaming of the stadium, most fans and local press still refer to the home ground as the Kassam Stadium.

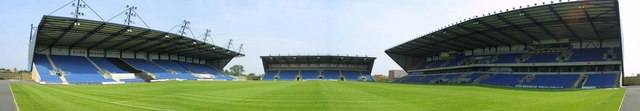
View from the open end of the Kassam Stadium

At the 2008 Annual General Meeting, club chairman Nick Merry said "The price is agreed for the stadium at £13 million. That is not negotiable but the valuation of the stadium is some way short of that so funding that deficit needs to make commercial sense. We are not prepared to put the future of Oxford United at risk. Any deal has to make sense for both the short term and long term future of this club."

In May 2012, rugby union club London Welsh applied to move their home ground to the Kassam Stadium following promotion from the RFU Championship, and their opening Premiership fixture was played there on 2 September 2012. The rugby club returned to their former home, Old Deer Park in Richmond-upon-Thames, after relegation from the Premiership at the end of the 2014–15 season.

=== New Oxford United stadium ===
In January 2022, a leaked letter suggested that Oxford United were considering leaving the Kassam Stadium for a proposed new stadium at Stratfield Brake near Kidlington.

In February 2023, Oxford United unveiled plans to build a new 'all-electric', 16,000-seat stadium, to open in 2026, on the Triangle site in Kidlington. Oxfordshire County Council's cabinet had consented to lease the proposed site to the club. South of Kidlington roundabout, the site is between Frieze Way and Oxford Road, with proposed pedestrian access from Oxford Parkway railway station. In June 2024, a decision on the application was postponed to early 2025 to allow further work on the proposals to "provide further clarity" for the planning committee. In May 2025, a short-term extension was agreed between the club and Firoka Group to allow them to play at the Kassam Stadium up to 2028, conditional on planning permission for the proposed new stadium being granted. On 14 August, Cherwell District Council granted planning permission for the new stadium, subject to approval by the Secretary of State for Housing, Communities and Local Government.

=== Records ===
The attendance record at the Kassam Stadium is 12,243. This was for Oxford's final match of the 2005–06 League Two season, a 3–2 defeat by Leyton Orient that sealed their relegation from the Football League. It beat the previous record of 12,177 for a 3–0 League Cup defeat by Aston Villa on 6 November 2002. During the summer of 2006, Oxford United hosted Manchester United in a friendly game that attracted 11,463 people, and on Boxing Day, 2006, the ground held a Conference Premier record attendance of 11,065 for the 0–0 draw against Woking. This was surpassed during the play-off 2nd leg on 3 May 2010, where the attendance was 11,963 for the visit of Rushden & Diamonds. In January 2016, a crowd of 11,673 watched a 3–2 FA Cup win against Swansea City, which was the biggest home gate for almost four years.

In June 2006, Sir Elton John played a concert to a crowd of around 16,500.

In 2006–07, when Oxford led the Conference National for most of the season before being overhauled by Dagenham & Redbridge and then being eliminated from the playoffs by Exeter City, the average attendance at the Kassam Stadium was 6,332. However, with Oxford's worse form in 2007–08 the average attendance slumped sharply to 4,728. Despite Oxford once again finishing mid-table in 2008–09 attendances rose marginally and the average attendance of that campaign was 4,879. Promotion back to the Football League was achieved via the playoffs in 2009–10, during which Oxford's average attendance enjoyed a dramatic rise and narrowly exceeded the 6,000 mark.

== Structure and facilities ==
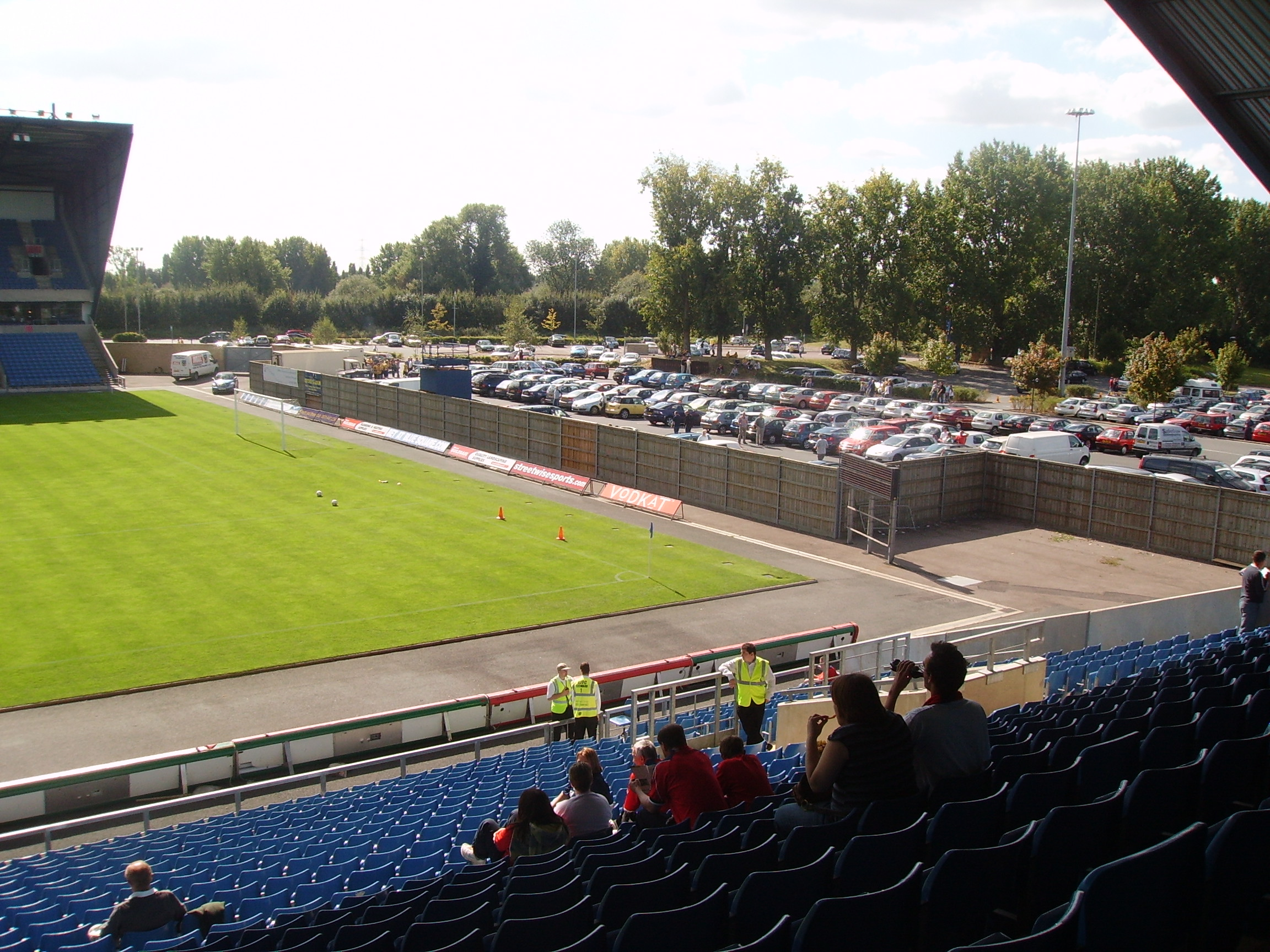
The undeveloped west end of the stadium

A distinctive feature of the stadium is a reflective glass panelling that makes up the main entrance. Sections of the panelling have been subject to vandalism.

The stadium offers a number of conference rooms to host corporate and non-corporate events. The stadium's South Stand is host to 28 private hospitality boxes with each box capable of holding up to 20 people.

The ground currently consists of three stands.

- The North Stand (formerly known as the Manor Hospital or Weber BBQ Stand) is divided for use by both home and away supporters and has a capacity of 5,026.
- The East Stand (formerly sponsored by the Oxford Mail newspaper, and still commonly known as the Oxford Mail Stand) is home to the more vocal home supporters and can hold 2,879 spectators.
- The South Stand (currently without a sponsor) is the main structure of the stadium, housing the Quadrangle conference centre, the Exhibition Bar, the club offices and changing rooms, and a row of 28 glass-fronted executive boxes. The South Stand is divided into two tiers, with the lower tier including the ground's Family Section. It has a total capacity of 4,495.

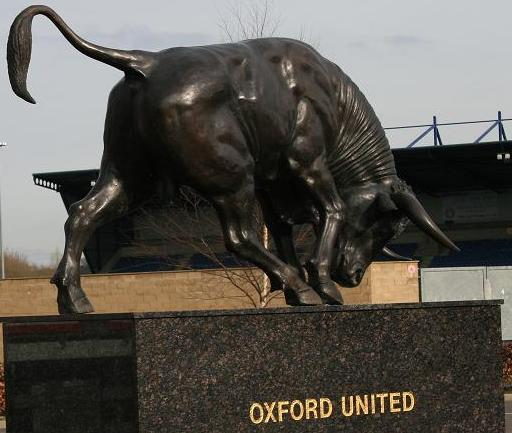
The bronze Ox outside the stadium

In March 2008 a bronze statue of an ox was erected outside the stadium. The unveiling was attended by the boardroom staff and a few fans. The club released a statement saying the reason for the unveiling not being more publicised was because of health and safety concerns if the unveiling took place on a match day. The statue was vandalised in January 2011.

== Rugby union ==
On 2 March 2003, the stadium was used as a neutral venue for the 2002–03 Powergen Cup semi-final between Northampton Saints and London Irish. Northampton defeated London Irish 38–9 in front of an attendance of 10,039.

On 30 May 2012, London Welsh RFC played the second leg of the 2011–12 RFU Championship play–off final against Cornish Pirates at the Kassam Stadium. London Welsh won the match 29–20 in front of a crowd of 3,456. The victory gave them an overall aggregate win of 66–41.

The stadium became London Welsh's home ground for the 2012–13 season in the English Premiership. London Welsh's promotion was initially rejected by the governing Rugby Football Union, but the decision was successfully appealed by the club. The move to the Kassam was a result of the Premiership's minimum capacity requirement of 10,000, which the side's former ground at Old Deer Park in Richmond did not meet. London Welsh played their opening fixture of the 2012–13 Aviva Premiership season against Leicester Tigers on 2 September 2012, losing by 38 points to 13, in front of a crowd of 6,850 people.

Despite the club's relegation from the Premiership at the end of the 2012–13 season, it was announced in June 2013 that the ground share would continue for the following season. In June 2015, the club announced that they had left the Kassam Stadium, moving back to Old Deer Park for the 2015–16 season, despite having signed a three-year contract in 2014.

== Transport ==
The car park at the stadium is limited as it is shared with the local Vue cinema and other attractions but a nearby overflow car park is ready to compensate for busier times.

Thames Travel offer special matchday buses to and from the stadium at selected points around the city at various times before and after kick-off.

== Other uses ==
In 2003, John Kelly, then County Emergency Planning Officer for Oxfordshire, confirmed in an interview with BBC News 24 that the stadium would be used under emergency powers which exist under contingency plans for the partial evacuation of London. The stadium provided accommodation for those having to be evacuated from Abingdon during floods in 2007. Each year the stadium plays host to the Oxfordshire Senior Cup final run by the Oxfordshire Football Association. The stadium has also hosted an Under-17 international football tournament and an Elton John music concert. In 2021, the stadium's conference centre served as a large-scale vaccination centre during the COVID-19 pandemic.

== Local legend ==
In 2001, Bishop of Oxford Richard Harries conducted an exorcism after the feeling of a malicious force and the team's loss of thirteen of their first seventeen games at the new stadium. The curse was blamed on a gypsy curse placed on the club by a Roma man who had been evicted from the site during construction.
