= Medlock (surname) =

Medlock or Medlocke is a surname. Notable people with these surnames include:

- Justin Medlock (born 1983), American football player
- Kevin Medlock (born 1954), Californian award-winning telescope and instrument maker, asteroid 19704 Medlock was named after him
- Mark Medlock (born 1978), German singer
- Owen Medlock (1938–2021), English footballer
- Shorty Medlocke (1912–1982), American musician (born Paul Robert Medlock)
  - Rickey Medlocke (born 1950), American musician, grandson of Shorty Medlocke
- Thomas T. Medlock (born 1934), American politician
