= Owen Medlock =

English footballer (1938–2021)

Personal information
- Full name: Owen Wilfred Medlock
- Date of birth: 8 March 1938
- Place of birth: Whittlesey, England
- Date of death: 17 October 2021 (aged 83)
- Position: Goalkeeper

Senior career*
Years	Team	Apps	(Gls)
1955–1959	Chelsea	0	(0)
1959	Swindon Town	3	(0)
1959–1963	Oxford United	110	(0)
1963–1968	Chelmsford City	136	(0)
Total		249	(0)
- * Club domestic league appearances and goals

Owen Wilfried Medlock (8 March 1938 – 17 October 2021) is an English former footballer who played for Oxford United, Chelsea and Swindon Town. He made a total of 133 appearances for Oxford, and was in goal for their first Football League fixture.
