= Firoz Kassam =

British businessman (born 1955)

- Born: 1955 (age 70–71); Tanzania
- Occupation: Businessman
- Known for: Ex-Owner of Oxford United F.C. Kassam Stadium

Firoz Kassam (born 1955) is a British businessman. Born and brought up in Tanzania, of Indian descent, he came to the UK at the age of 19. He owned Oxford United F.C. from 1999 to 2006, and was named the 309th wealthiest person in the UK in the Sunday Times Rich List 2009 with an estimated fortune of £180 million.

== Early life ==
Firoz Kassam was born in Tanzania, one of five children. His father had a small confectionery business, and his mother died when he was a child. They migrated to England when he was 19.

== Career ==
Starting out with a fish and chip shop, Kassam made his fortune as a slum hotelier and in the 1980s was labelled a "merchant of misery". He bought run-down London hostels and hotels and was paid by local councils to fill them with homeless people and asylum seekers, until the tenants rebelled over the conditions in which they were being housed.

In 1999, Kassam bought Oxford United F.C. for £1, also taking over its debts, estimated to be in the region of £13m. In 2000, he resumed building a 12,500-capacity stadium at Minchery Farm on the edge of Oxford, which he called the Kassam Stadium. Construction of this stadium had actually been in progress since 1997, but was suspended in the early stages due to the club's financial problems. The fourth side of the stadium was left empty due to Oxford's decline in the league, as they had dropped down two divisions while the stadium was being built. The development includes a hotel, cinema, bowling alley, gym, health centre and restaurants. Oxford United played its first game there on 18 August 2001, in Division Three of the Football League. Kassam sold the football club in 2006, but retained ownership of the stadium through his company Firoka with Oxford United (and later also London Welsh RFC) as tenants. Oxford United's old home, the Manor Ground in Headington, was sold by Kassam, first to his own holding company for £6 million, and then to developers for £12 million in 1999. The ground has since been demolished and developed into the Manor Hospital, which opened in October 2004.

Kassam also owns the historic mansion and grounds of Heythrop Park which he purchased in 1999 for £15m. The site underwent a £50 million rebuilding programme and has been developed into a luxury hotel and spa with an 18-hole championship golf course and restored landscape gardens. In August 2005, he purchased Studley Castle in Warwickshire, a hotel and conference centre formerly owned by Phoenix Venture Holdings, the consortium who owned carmaker MG Rover from 2000 until 2005.

In February 2006, Kassam's Firoka company was announced as the preferred bidder for the redevelopment of Alexandra Palace in London. The whole Palace would be given to Firoka on a 125-year lease for commercial uses. As it is held on a charitable trust, and Firoka is a private company, this proposal was controversial. It was subject to agreement of the Charity Commission, which received 350 objections to the lease to develop a multi-use exhibition, leisure and entertainment complex. On 5 October 2007 in the High Court, Mr Justice Sullivan granted an application by a member of the conservationist Save Ally Pally group to quash the Charity Commission's Order authorizing the lease.

== Net worth ==
In 2007, his net worth was estimated at £240 million. In the 2017 Sunday Times Rich List, his net worth was £315 million.
