= Oxford United F.C. =

Association football club in Oxford, England

- Full name: Oxford United Football Club
- Nicknames: The U's; Yellows
- Short name: OUFC
- Founded: 27 October 1893; 133 years ago (as Headington F.C.)
- Ground: Kassam Stadium
- Capacity: 12,573
- Owner: Erick Thohir
- Chairman: Dusan Bogdanovic
- Head coach: Aaron Ramsey
- League: EFL League One
- 2025–26: EFL Championship, 22nd of 24 (relegated)
- Website: oufc.co.uk
Home colours	Away colours	Third colours

Oxford United Football Club (/ˈɒksfərd/) is a professional football club based in Oxford, England. Its team compete in EFL League One, the third tier of English football, following relegation from the EFL Championship in 2025–26. Founded as Headington Football Club in 1893, the club adopted its current name in 1960. The team, nicknamed The U's, have played their home games at the Kassam Stadium since 2001; this replaced their previous home, the Manor Ground.

The club joined the Football League in 1962 after winning the Southern Football League, reaching the Second Division in 1968. After relegation in 1976, between 1984 and 1986 the club earned successive promotions into the First Division, and won the League Cup in 1986. However, Oxford were unable thereby to enter the 1987 UEFA Cup because of the UEFA ban on English clubs in European competitions. Relegation from the top flight in 1988 began an 18-year decline which saw the club relegated to the Conference in 2006, becoming the first winners of a major trophy to be relegated from the Football League. After four seasons, Oxford returned to League Two in 2010 via the play-offs, and six seasons later achieved promotion to League One, after finishing second in League Two in 2016. In 2024 they were promoted to the EFL Championship via the play-offs.

Notable players include Ron Atkinson, who holds the record for the most overall appearances (560); John Shuker, who holds the record for the most appearances in the Football League (478); and Ron's late brother Graham Atkinson who holds the record for the most goals scored (107). In total, nineteen players have made international appearances while playing for the club.

The team's traditional kit colours are yellow shirts, along with navy-coloured shorts and socks. Their crest showcases an ox, symbolizing both the name and historical background of the city, which was initially established as a market town for cattle located adjacent to a ford on the River Isis. Oxford have a long-standing and fierce rivalry with Swindon Town, with whom they contest the A420 derby.

== History ==
=== 1893–1960: Headington F.C. to Headington United ===
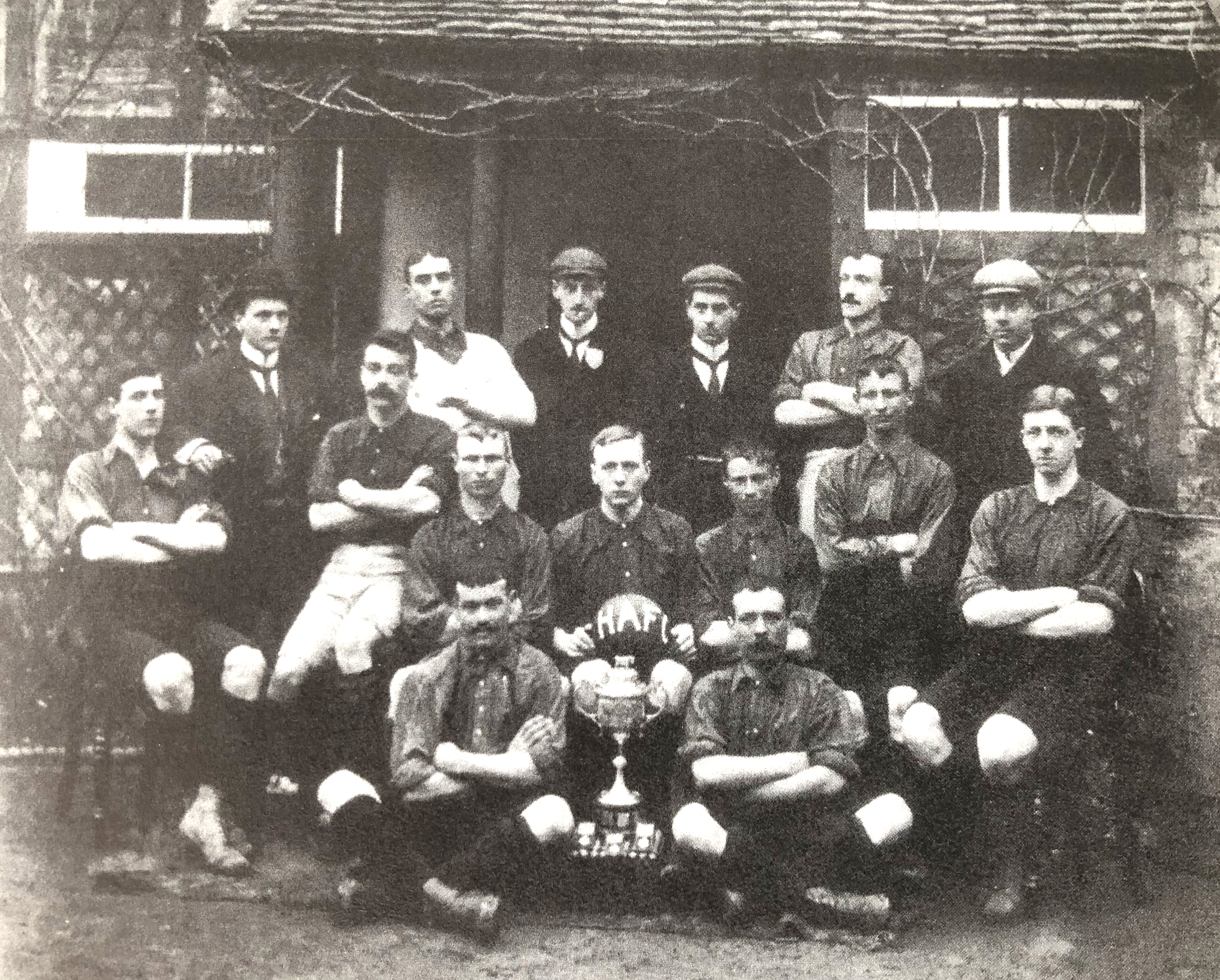
One of the earliest-known Headington F.C. club shots, from the 1897–98 season

Oxford United was founded on 27 October 1893 as Headington Football Club, in a meeting at the Britannia Inn, Headington. The meeting was called by a local doctor, Robert Hitchings, as a way for the cricketers of Headington Cricket Club to maintain their fitness during the winter break. The fellow founder was the Revd John Scott-Tucker, vicar at St. Andrew's Church, who was appointed first president of the club. The suffix United was added in 1911 after merging with Headington Quarry. The club's first football match played was against Cowley Barracks. Headington had no regular home until 1913; it was able to purchase Wootten's Field on London Road, but this was redeveloped in 1920, forcing the club to move. A permanent home was found in 1925, when the club purchased the Manor Ground site on London Road. The facility was used as a cricket pitch in the summer, and a football pitch in the winter. In 1899, six years after their formation, Headington United joined the Oxfordshire District League Second Division, where they competed until the outbreak of the First World War; the Second Division was renamed the Oxfordshire Junior League after the resumption of football in 1919. In 1921, the club was admitted into the Oxon Senior League. The first season included a 9–0 victory, with eight of those goals coming from P. Drewitt. This remains a record for the highest number of goals scored by an Oxford player in a first-team match. At this time a small rivalry existed with Cowley F.C., who were based a few miles south of Headington. During a league game on May Day, the referee gave two penalties to Cowley; supporters broke past security and players, resulting in the referee being "freely baited". The first FA Cup tie played was in 1931, against Hounslow F.C. in the Preliminary Round, ending in an 8–2 defeat for Headington. United spent two seasons in the Spartan League in 1947 and 1948, finishing fifth and fourth respectively. It was around this time that the cricket team left the Manor and moved to new premises near Cowley Barracks.

=== 1948–1960: Professional football ===
A move into professional football was first considered during the 1948–49 season. Vic Couling, the president at the time, had applied for Headington to become a member of a new Second Division in the Southern League. Other teams that applied included Weymouth, Kettering Town and future league side Cambridge United. Although the plans were postponed, the First Division was going to be expanded by two clubs; Weymouth and Headington were elected. It was later discovered that Llanelli had just one vote fewer than Headington. Oxford's first season in the Southern League was in 1949, the same year they turned professional. Former First Division forward Harry Thompson was hired as manager. In 1950, Headington United became the first professional club in Britain to install floodlights, and used them on 18 December against Banbury Spencer. They initially played in orange and blue shirts, but changed to yellow home shirts for the 1957–58 season. The reason for the change is unknown.

=== 1960–1985: Oxford United and Football League rise ===
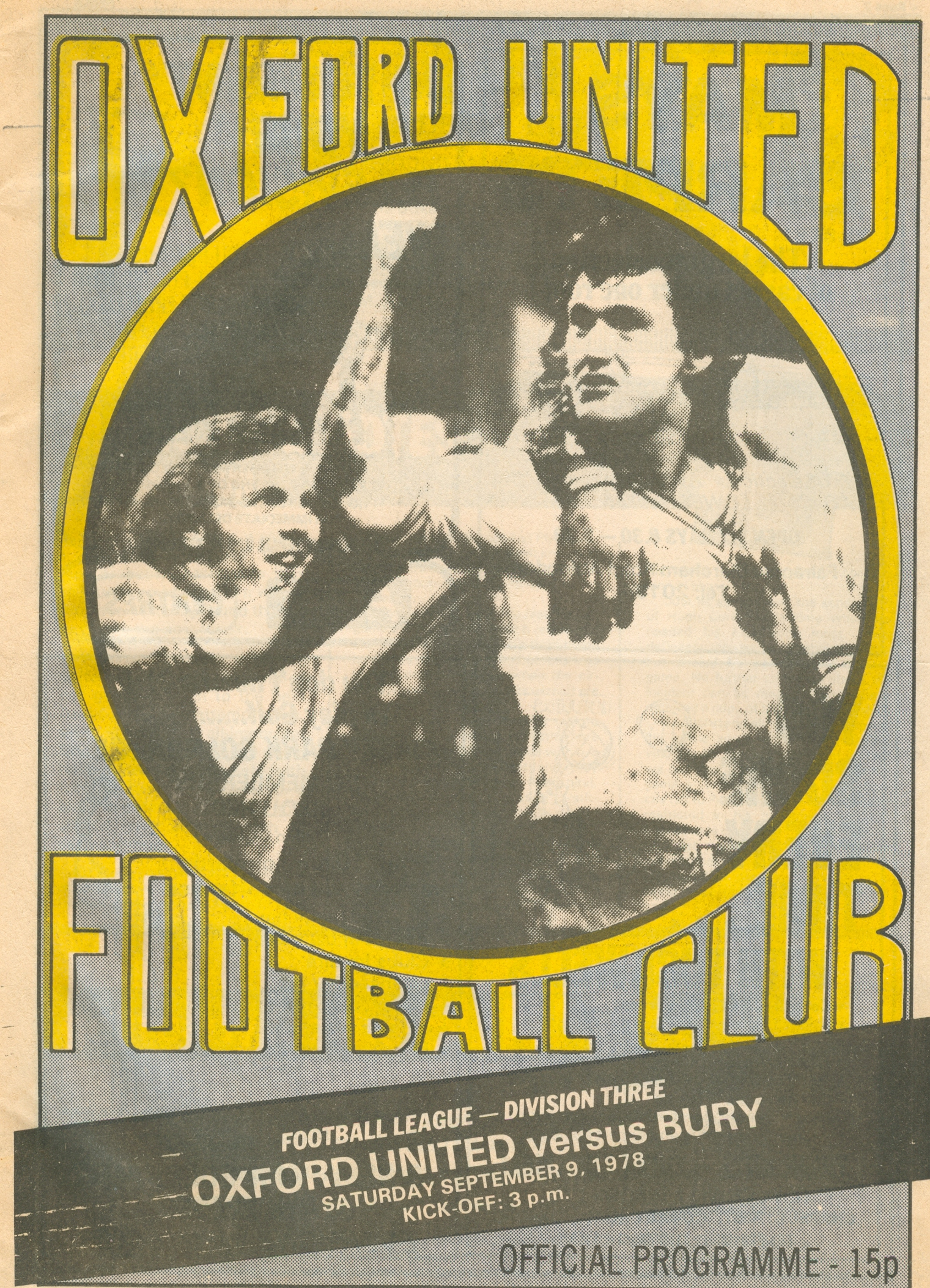
A matchday programme against Bury in 1978

In 1960, Headington United was renamed Oxford United, to give the club a higher profile. Two years later, in 1962, the club won the Southern League title for the second successive season and was elected to the Football League Fourth Division, occupying the vacant place left by bankrupt Accrington Stanley. Two successive eighteenth-place finishes followed, before promotion to the Third Division was achieved in 1965. A year before the promotion, Oxford became the first Fourth Division club to reach the sixth round of the FA Cup, but have not progressed that far in the competition since. Oxford won the Third Division title in 1967–68, their sixth season as a league club, but after eight years of relative stability the club was relegated from the Second Division in 1975–76.

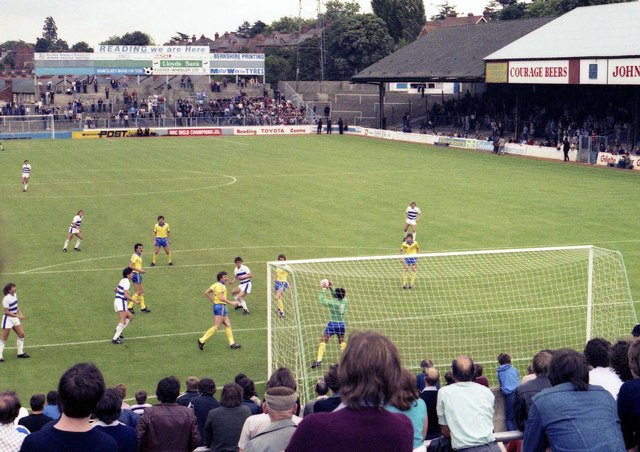
A Football League Group Cup match against Reading in 1981

In 1982, as a Third Division side, Oxford United faced closure because of the club's inability to service the debts owed to Barclays Bank, but were rescued when businessman Robert Maxwell took over the club. In April 1983, Maxwell proposed merging United with neighbours Reading, to form a new club called the Thames Valley Royals, to play at Didcot. Jim Smith would have managed the club and been assisted by Reading boss Maurice Evans. The merger was called off as a result of fans of both clubs protesting against the decision. Furthermore, the Reading chairman stepped down and was replaced by an opponent of the merger. Maxwell also threatened to fold the club if the merger did not go through. Oxford won the Third Division title after the 1983–84 season under the management of Jim Smith, who also guided them to the Second Division title the following year. This meant that Oxford United would be playing First Division football in the 1985–86 season, 23 years after joining the Football League. Smith moved to Queens Park Rangers shortly after the promotion success, and made way for chief scout Maurice Evans, who, several seasons earlier, had won the Fourth Division title with Reading.

=== 1985–1994: First Division and cup success ===
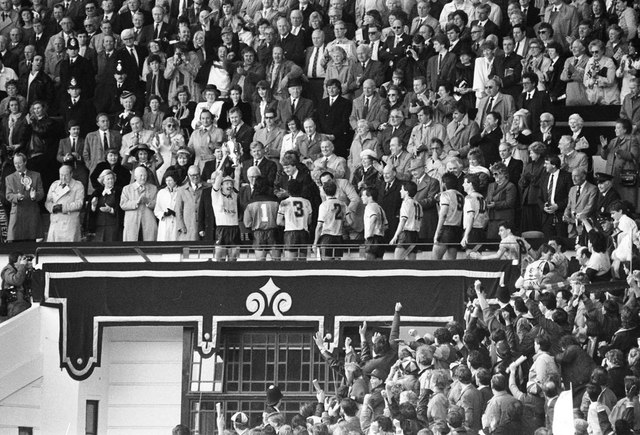
Oxford United players lifting the 1985–86 Football League Cup trophy

Oxford United finished eighteenth in the 1985–86 First Division, avoiding relegation on the last day of the season after defeating Arsenal 3–0. They also won the Football League Cup, known at the time as the Milk Cup under a sponsorship deal. As winners, Oxford would have qualified for the following season's UEFA Cup, had it not been for the ban on English teams that had resulted from the previous year's Heysel Stadium disaster. After beating fellow First Division side Aston Villa in the semi-final 4–3 on aggregate, Oxford faced Queens Park Rangers in the final, which was held at Wembley Stadium on 20 April 1986. The game finished 3–0 with goals from Trevor Hebberd, Ray Houghton and Jeremy Charles. After the match long-serving physiotherapist, 72-year-old Ken Fish, collected one of the winner's medals, instead of manager Maurice Evans. Evans felt that Fish deserved the medal for his service to the club, and so gave him his, in what was seen as an "unprecedented gesture". It was the last time the League Cup was played under the name "Milk Cup", sponsors Littlewoods taking over the following season. John Aldridge scored 23 goals across the season, while their survival was helped by the arrival of veteran Steve Perryman from Tottenham.

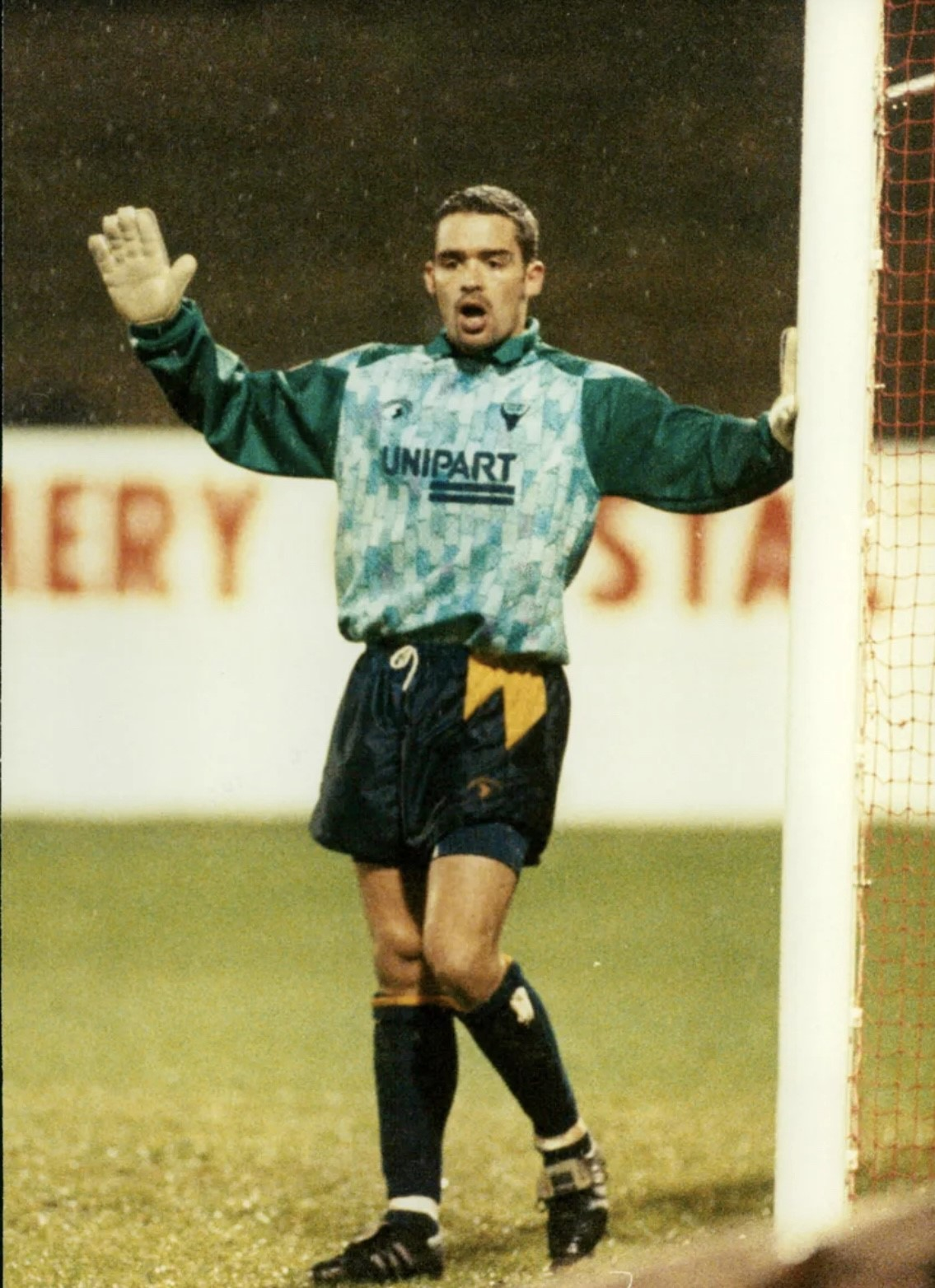
Goalkeeper Paul Reece in action during the 1991–92 season

The 1986–87 season saw Oxford United narrowly avoid relegation and stay in the First Division. Perryman left to become player-manager of Brentford, while Aldridge scored 15 times in 25 league games but was sold to Liverpool mid-season for £750,000 while Dean Saunders joined from Brighton for £60,000 and Martin Foyle was signed from Aldershot for £140,000. Robert Maxwell resigned as chairman in May 1987, to take over at Derby County, handing the club to his son Kevin. The cup-winning team continued to break up however, as captain Malcolm Shotton was sold to Portsmouth, Kevin Brock joined former manager Jim Smith at QPR and Welsh international Charles was forced to retire due to injury. Oxford started the season respectably and spent much of the early stages around the fringes of the top 10, though Houghton would follow Aldridge to Liverpool for £825,000. However, after November the team would fail to win another game, and Maurice Evans was sacked in March 1988 with Oxford bottom of the First Division. Former Liverpool defender Mark Lawrenson was named as Oxford's new manager, but was unable to prevent relegation to the Second Division. He was sacked three months into the 1988–89 Second Division campaign after a dispute with the chairman over the £1 million sale of striker Dean Saunders to Derby County; Derby were owned by Robert Maxwell, father of the then Oxford United chairman, Kevin Maxwell. Following Robert Maxwell's death in 1991, his personal estate, including the club, became insolvent. After a long search for a new owner, during which BioMass Recycling Ltd took over the club, Brian Horton was named as Oxford's new manager. He remained in charge until September 1993, when he moved to Manchester City in the recently formed FA Premier League. Horton led United to mid-table finishes during his management spell, apart from a 21st-place finish at the end of the 1991–92 season. A 2–1 win over Tranmere Rovers, and a win for Blackburn Rovers over Plymouth Argyle, meant United survived relegation by two points. Oxford, now in the renamed Football League Division One, briefly restored Maurice Evans as manager, before turning to Bristol City manager Denis Smith. Despite Smith's efforts, Oxford were relegated to Division Two at the end of the 1993–94 season, with just four wins in the last eleven games.

=== 1994–2001: Financial problems and dropping through the divisions ===
Denis Smith brought in two strikers who were experienced in the top division: Southampton's Paul Moody and Nottingham Forest's Nigel Jemson. Oxford finished seventh in 1994–95 season, and in the following season gained promotion by finishing runners-up to rivals Swindon Town, despite not winning an away game till the end of January. Robin Herd, co-owner of the March Racing Team, took control of the club in 1995. In June of that year, the board of directors unveiled plans for a new 16,000-seat stadium at Minchery Farm, to replace the dilapidated Manor Ground. The club had hoped to move into the new stadium near the Blackbird Leys housing estate by the start of the 1998–99 season, but construction was suspended during the preceding season, because construction company Taylor Woodrow had not been paid for the work already undertaken.

The 1996–97 season saw Oxford finish seventeenth, and included the sale of Scottish international defender Matt Elliott to Leicester City. Despite Smith's departure to West Bromwich Albion in December 1997, United finished twelfth the following season under his successor, and former captain, Malcolm Shotton. Shotton was previously the assistant manager of the Barnsley side that gained promotion to the Premier League. During October 1998, the backroom staff at the club went unpaid, due to United's financial situation with the new stadium, and the threat of administration caused a group of fans to set up a pressure group called Fighting for Oxford United's Life (FOUL). The group began to publicise the club's plight through a series of meetings and events, including a 'Scarf of Unity', which was a collection of scarves from various clubs which was long enough to stretch around the perimeter of the pitch. Chairman Robin Herd stepped down to concentrate on his engineering projects, and in April 1999 Firoz Kassam bought Herd's 89.9% controlling interest in Oxford United for £1, with which he also inherited the club's estimated £15 million debt. Kassam reduced £9 million of the debt to just £900,000, by virtue of a Company Voluntary Arrangement, by which unsecured creditors who were owed over £1,000 were reimbursed with 10p for every pound they were owed. Secured creditors were paid off when Kassam sold the Manor to another of his companies, for £6 million. Kassam set about completing the unfinished stadium, gaining planning permission for a bowling alley, multiplex cinema and hotel next to the stadium, following a series of legal battles which were eventually all settled. The season ended with relegation back to the Second Division.

Oxford's poor form continued into the 1999–2000 season and, with the team in the relegation zone, Shotton resigned in late October. After a few months with Mickey Lewis as player-manager, former manager Denis Smith returned to the club, managing a twentieth-place finish, one place clear of relegation. Smith's second spell didn't last long, and he was replaced by David Kemp a few weeks into the following campaign. At the end of the 2000–01 season, Oxford were relegated back to the Third Division for the first time in 35 years, with 100 goals conceded. They suffered 33 league defeats, the second-highest number of league defeats ever endured by a league club in a single season.

=== 2001–2006: New stadium and Division Three years ===
Oxford began the next season with a new manager and a new stadium, with the relocation to the Kassam Stadium completed after six years of speculation. Former Liverpool and England defender Mark Wright was given the manager's job, but resigned in late November, after being accused of making racist remarks to referee Joe Ross. Wright's successor, Ian Atkins, was unable to make an immediate impact and Oxford finished in 21st position in the league, at the time their lowest-ever league position. United missed out on the play-off places in the following season by one place and one point. Fifteen wins at the start of the 2003–04 season saw Oxford top of the table at the end of January. However, Ian Atkins was sacked in March 2004 after allegedly agreeing to take charge at rivals Bristol Rovers.

Atkins's replacement, Graham Rix, could only manage a ninth-place finish at the end of the season, and was sacked the following November. Oxford replaced him with Argentine Ramón Díaz, who managed the team to a mid-table finish. Diaz and his team of assistants left the club at the beginning of May 2005, after being banned from the ground by the chairman following failed negotiations. During his time at the club, Diaz brought in a number of South American players including his own sons, and Juan Pablo Raponi. Ex-England midfielder and former West Bromwich Albion manager Brian Talbot signed a two-year contract to replace Rix. Talbot found little success and was sacked in March 2006, with the club in 22nd place. He was replaced by youth team coach Darren Patterson.

On 21 March 2006, Firoz Kassam sold the club, including its debts, for approximately £2 million to Florida-based businessman Nick Merry, who had played for United's youth team in the mid-1970s. Merry immediately made changes to the club, including the hiring of former manager Jim Smith in his second spell. Despite signing five new players on his first day in charge, Smith was unable to prevent relegation at the end of the 2005–06 season. After 44 years in English league football, Oxford were relegated to the Conference National after finishing in 23rd place, becoming the first former winners of a major trophy to be relegated from the league. Coincidentally, Accrington Stanley, the club whose bankruptcy in 1962 allowed United to be elected into the League, was one of the two clubs promoted to replace them.

=== 2006–2010: Non-League football and Conference play-off winner ===
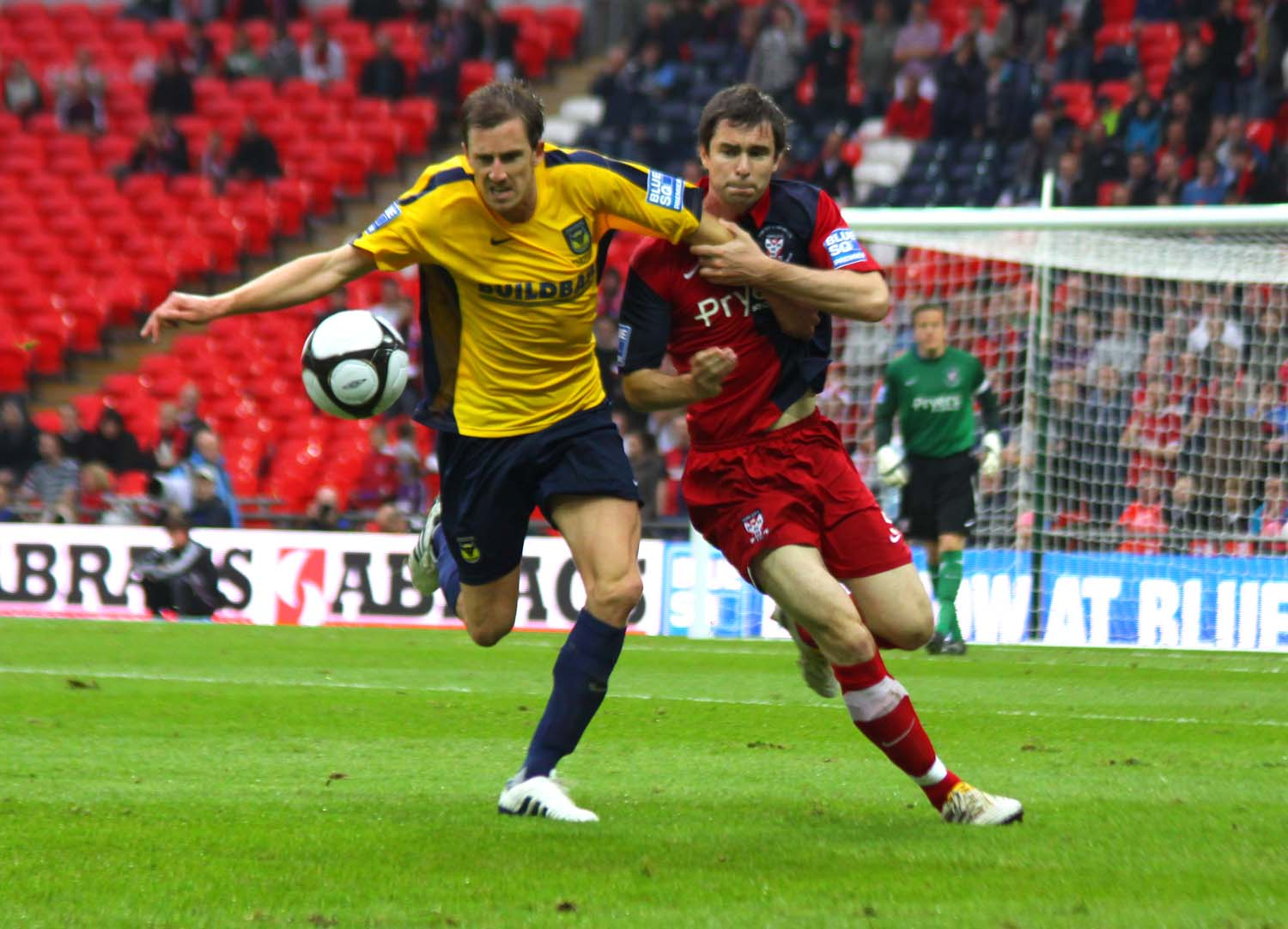
Jack Midson (left) in action against York City in the 2010 Conference Premier play-off final

Jim Smith was retained as manager for the following season, and it started positively for Oxford, with 14 wins and 8 draws from the opening 25 games. A run of eleven league games without a win followed, and saw United drop to second, where they remained until the end of the season. On Boxing Day 2006, a crowd of 11,065 watched United draw 0–0 with Woking at the Kassam Stadium, the largest-ever attendance for a Conference match (excluding play-offs). Oxford qualified for the play-offs by finishing second, but lost on penalties in the semi-final to Exeter City.

On 9 November 2007, Jim Smith resigned as manager and first-team coach Darren Patterson returned as manager. In a lacklustre season which included defeats to Droylsden and Tonbridge Angels, camouflaged by a belated run of eight wins in the last eleven games, Oxford finished ninth in the Conference National in 2007–08, 10 points off the last play-off place.

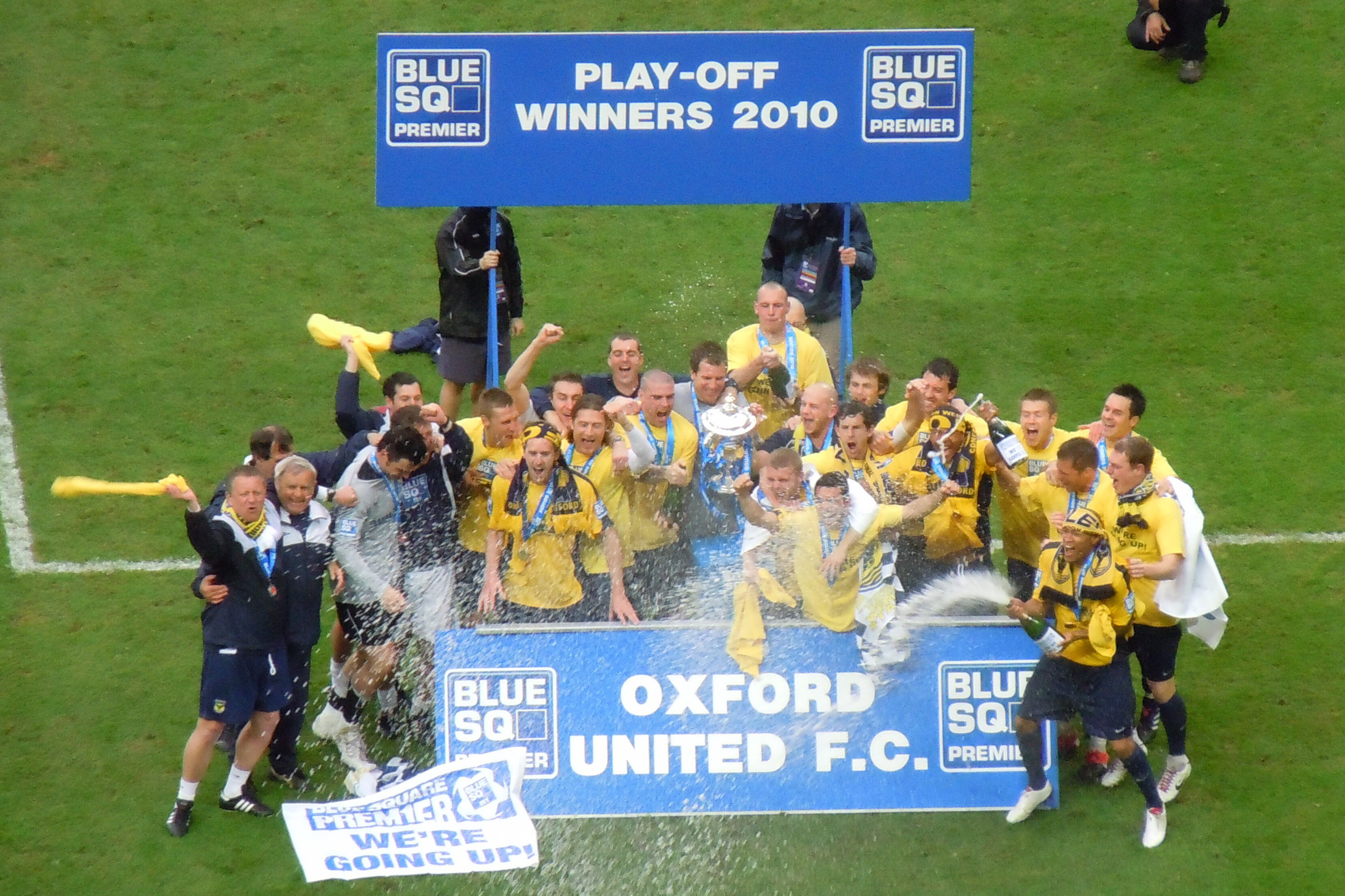
Oxford United players celebrated their Football Conference play-off winner at Wembley Stadium

On 2 October 2008, Nick Merry stepped down as chairman to be replaced by Kelvin Thomas, who had been part of the management team at the time of Merry's takeover. Just under two months later, Patterson was sacked after a poor run of form, and was replaced by former Halifax Town manager Chris Wilder. Following Wilder's arrival, the team won 15 of the remaining 21 league matches that season. A 5-point deduction for fielding an unregistered player resulted in a seventh-place finish, four points and two places short of the play-offs.

Oxford led the table for most of the first half of the 2009–10 season, but dropped into the play-off places after a poor run, finishing third. They beat Rushden & Diamonds over two legs to advance to the play-off final against York City on 16 May 2010. Oxford won the final 3–1, to return to the Football League for the 2010–11 season. The attendance was 42,669, a new record for the final, with around 33,000 being United fans.

=== 2010–2022: Return to the Football League ===
Oxford's first game back in the Football League was away to Burton, which finished in a 0–0 draw; their first League win was on 4 September against Morecambe at the Kassam Stadium, with James Constable scoring a hat-trick in a 4–0 victory. They finished the season in 12th place.

The team spent much of the 2011–12 season in or around the playoff places, and achieved the double over rivals (and eventual champions) Swindon Town for the first time since the 1973–74 season. However, they failed to win any of their last seven matches and finished the season in ninth place, two places and four points outside the play-offs.

Chairman Kelvin Thomas stepped down during the 2012 close season, to be replaced by owner Ian Lenagan. The 2012–13 season was blighted by injuries and patchy form: after opening the season with three wins and briefly heading the table, United lost their next six games, a pattern of inconsistency that was to continue throughout the season. United finished outside the play-offs for the third consecutive season, but manager Chris Wilder was given a further one-year contract in April 2013. Some Oxford fans were unhappy about the decision to renew Wilder's contract, having pressed for his sacking during the second half of the 2012–13 season.

After another bright start, Oxford led the table several times in the first half of the 2013–14 season. On 25 January 2014, with the club faltering though still in the play-off places, Wilder resigned as manager to take up the reins at relegation-threatened Northampton. Mickey Lewis subsequently became the caretaker manager for a second time for the club. On 22 March 2014, Gary Waddock was appointed the head coach of the club after a lengthy interview process, leaving his job as Head of Coaching at MK Dons. Under Lewis and Waddock, Oxford slipped out of the play-off places in the final few weeks of the season, finishing a disappointing eighth in the table, nine points off the last playoff place.

In July 2014, Waddock's contract was terminated after a change of ownership and he was replaced by Michael Appleton. Waddock's surprise sacking ensured he had the worst record of any Oxford manager, winning only once and losing seven times in his eight games in charge of the club. After an indifferent first season under Appleton, Oxford achieved promotion to League One in his second year in charge, finishing the 2015–16 season in second place with 86 points. They also reached the final of the League Trophy at Wembley Stadium, only the club's third appearance at the national stadium, but were defeated 3–2 by their League One opponents Barnsley. In 2016–17, having sold Kemar Roofe during the close season for a record £3m and signed Marvin Johnson for an undisclosed fee also thought to be a club record, Oxford finished eighth in League One, four points short of the playoff places, and again lost in the final of the League Trophy at Wembley, this time to relegation-bound Coventry City.

In June 2017, Appleton left the club to become assistant manager at Leicester City of the Premier League, and was replaced by Pep Clotet, formerly assistant manager at Leeds United. On 22 January 2018, Clotet was sacked, with the club in tenth place in League One after a home defeat to bottom club Bury.

In February 2018, the club was bought by Thai businessman Sumrith "Tiger" Thanakarnjanasuth, who replaced Darryl Eales as chairman; Thanakarnjanasuth had previously been part of the consortium that owned Reading F.C.

After a lengthy period under caretaker-manager Derek Fazackerley during which the team slipped to within 4 points of the relegation zone, Karl Robinson, former manager of Milton Keynes Dons and Charlton Athletic, was appointed on 22 March 2018. Robinson had to wait five games for his first win, but his aim of retaining the club's League One status was achieved with three wins from the last five games of the season. The club finished in 16th place on 56 points, six points above the relegation zone.

A 12th-place finished was achieved the following year, despite the club spending over half of the season in the relegation zone. An improved fourth-place finished followed in the shortened 2019–20 season, which was affected by the COVID-19 pandemic. When the season was suspended, Oxford were third in the table, but following an agreement from clubs to end the season early, the U's dropped one place to fourth after the final table was decided under an unweighted points per game system. The play-offs continued as normal, where United faced Portsmouth in the semi-final. Following a 1–1 draw in the first leg, United won 5–4 on penalties when the second game ended 1–1 after extra time. In the final behind closed doors at Wembley, Oxford lost 2–1 to Wycombe Wanderers, Joe Jacobson's penalty proving decisive in the tie.

=== 2022–present: Indonesian ownership and a two-year Championship return ===
Oxford made the play-offs again the following season, losing 6–3 on aggregate to Blackpool, who went on to win the final. In the 2021–22 season, United were the league's joint top scorers and finished in 8th place. During the season, the club's ownership changed hands again, with Indonesian businessmen and minority shareholders Erick Thohir and Anindya Bakrie taking control after a series of transactions. Thanakarnjanasuth's investment with the club remained, but he was replaced as chairman by Grant Ferguson.

Oxford were promoted to the Championship in the 2023–24 season, after beating Bolton Wanderers 2–0 in the play-off final, marking their return to the division after a 25-year absence. They finished 17th in their first season back in the Championship, but at the end of their second season were relegated back to League One.

== Colours and badge ==
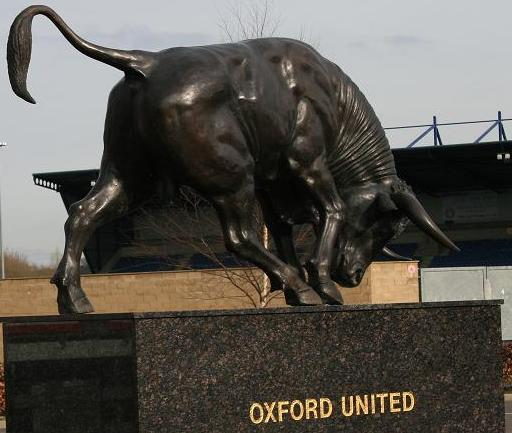
The bronze ox outside Kassam Stadium

Oxford United crest depicts an ox to symbolise the location. It reflects the name and history of the city, as Oxford was originally a market town situated near to a ford on the River Isis, which was used by cattle. The shape and design of the crest has changed numerous times since it was first produced. When playing as Headington and during the early years of Oxford United, the crest included a full ox crossing the ford, as well as the initials H.U.F.C. (pre-1962) or the name Oxford United (post name-change). In 1972, the crest became circular.

In 1979, zoologist Desmond Morris, who at the time was a club director, designed the current ox-head logo which was based on a Minoan-style bull's head. The first iteration of this design showed just the ox's head on a yellow and black background. The words 'Oxford United Football Club' were placed around the ox. For the next 17 years, the crest was simply the ox's head coloured blue, with various combinations of wording surrounding it. For example, in the 1987–88 season, the wording 25th Anniversary was placed under the crest. In 1996, the crest had a shield shape and contained the ox's head over the ford, on a yellow background. This version was retained until the move to the Kassam Stadium in 2001, when club steward Rob Alderman designed a new version. It has a similar design to the preceding crest, but the ox and ford were contained in a circle with a yellow background, with the remainder of the crest being coloured blue. This was used until 2016 when the club reverted to the ox head with no shield and no wording. In 2018 the crest was redesigned again to mark the club's 125th anniversary. This saw the return of the shield around the ox head with the name of the club above it. This is the version which remains in use currently.

In 2008, a bronze statue of an ox was unveiled outside of what would have been the west stand. It was subsequently vandalised in January 2011, being covered in pink paint and the club used the opportunity to raise money for a breast cancer charity.

While playing as Headington United, orange and blue striped shirts were worn with navy shorts and socks. The design of the shirt changed regularly, with the stripes being changed every few seasons. After joining the Southern League, the blue stripes were lost for good and a lighter shade of orange was used for the shirt. The yellow kit was first worn during the 1957–58 season, with black shorts and yellow socks. During the late 1970s and early 1980s, the black shorts were first replaced with yellow ones, and then with royal blue shorts. Since the early 1990s, the strip has been composed of the yellow shirt and navy coloured shorts and socks. A large variety of away kits has been used over the years, ranging from red and black stripes on the shirts, to a fully white kit. The first sponsor to appear on the shirt was Sunday Journal, a local newspaper, in 1982. Between 1983 and 1985, there were three sponsors: BPCC, Pergamon and the Sunday People. Following those were Wang Laboratories (1985 to 1989), Pergamon (1989 to 1991), Unipart (1991 to 2000), Domino (2000 to 2001) and Buildbase (from the move to the Kassam Stadium in 2001 to 2010).

Following the return to the Football League, Bridle Insurance became new shirt sponsors. The Bridle deal ended after the conclusion of the 2012–13 season. The home sponsor for the 2013–14 season was announced as Animalates, with the away kit being sponsored by Isinglass Consulting for that same season after winning an innovative prize draw. That one-year deal with Isinglass was extended for the 2014–15 season, again featuring on the away kits only. The home kit that season was sponsored by tyre company Black n Rounds. In July 2015, Oxford United announced a three-season deal with investment management company Liontrust Asset Management covering both home and away shirts. For the 2018–19 and 2019–20 season, the principal shirt sponsor was Thai beer firm Singha. The Tourism Authority of Thailand were announced as the new shirt sponsors, as part of a principle partnership agreement, in August 2020, using the brand name "Amazing Thailand".

=== Kit suppliers and shirt sponsors ===
Period	Kit manufacturer	Shirt sponsor
1973–1977	Umbro	—
1977–1980	Admiral Sportswear	—
1980–1982	Adidas	—
1982	Adidas	Sunday Journal
1982–1985	Spall	BPCC
1985–1989	Umbro	Wang Computers
1989–1990	Scoreline	—
1990–1991	Scoreline	Pergamon Press
1991–1994	Matchwinner	Unipart
1994–1996	Manor Leisure	Unipart
1996–1998	Own Brand	Unipart
1998–2000	New Balance	Unipart
2000–2001	New Balance	Domino
2001–2006	TFG Sports	Buildbase
2006–2009	Carlotti	Buildbase
2009–2010	Nike	Buildbase
2010–2013	Nike	Bridle Insurance
2013–2014	Nike	Animalates
2014–2015	Avec	Black 'n' Rounds
2015–2016	—	Liontrust
2016–2018	Starter	Liontrust
2018–2020	Puma	Singha
2020–2021	Puma	Visit Thailand
2021–2022	Puma	EB Charging
2022–2024	Macron	Bangkok Glass
2024–	Macron	Baxi

== Stadium ==
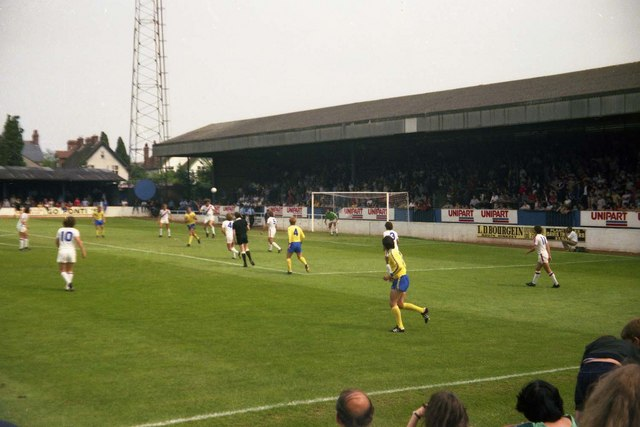
Oxford United match at the Manor Ground in 1980

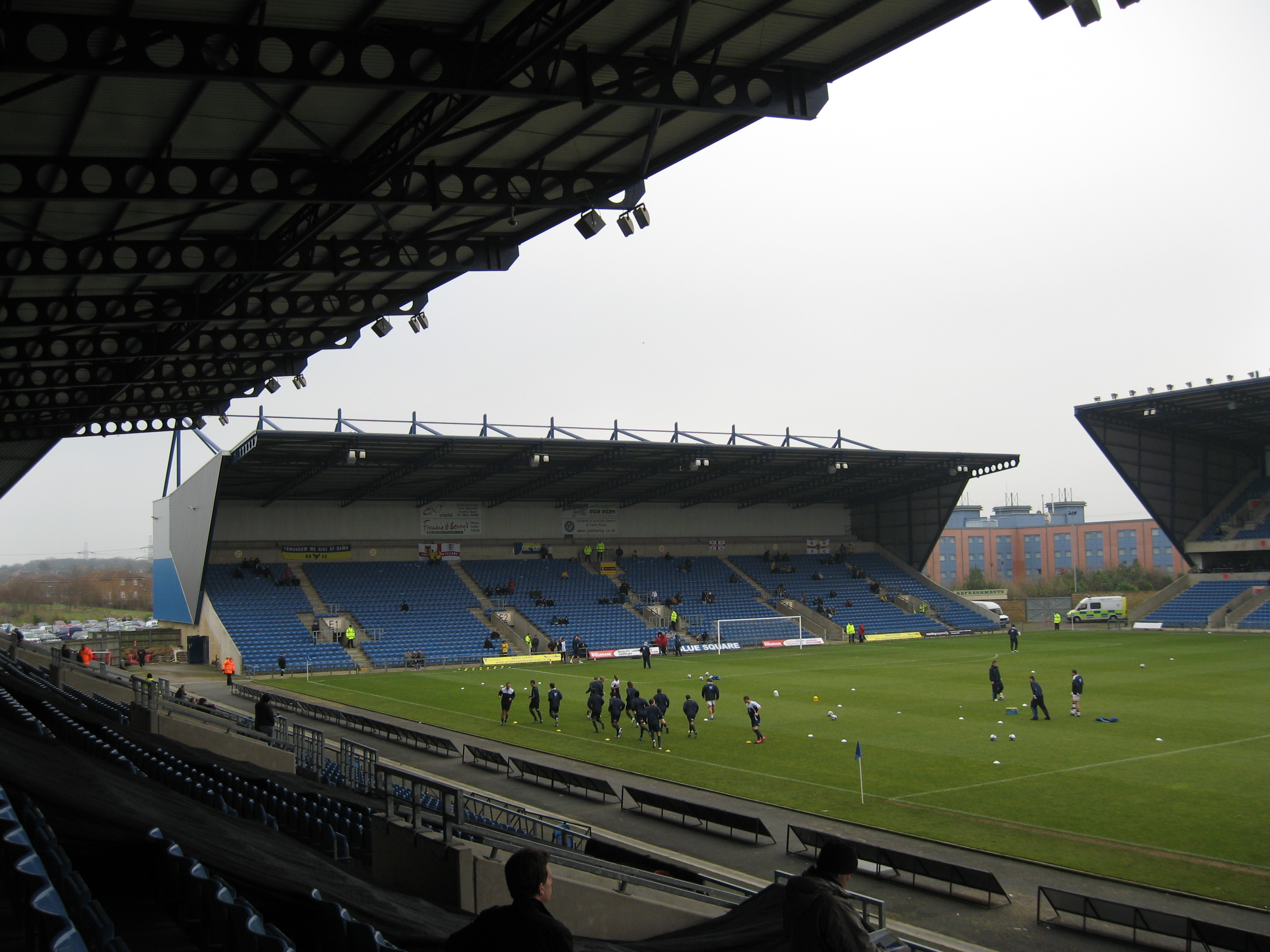
The East Stand, Kassam Stadium, Littlemore

Oxford United had no regular home until 1913, switching between the Quarry Recreation Ground, Wootten's Field (now Stephen Road), Sandy Lane (now Osler Road) and the Britannia Field (now the top end of Lime Walk), all in Headington. In 1913 they were able to purchase Wootten's Field on London Road, however, this was redeveloped in 1920 before a stadium could be built. Having purchased the Sandy Lane site, the club developed and played at the Manor Ground between 1925 and 2001. The ground was originally shared with Headington Cricket Club until 1949, when they moved to Cowley Barracks. The capacity at closure was 9,500, but hosted United's record crowd of 22,750 against Preston North End in an FA Cup sixth-round match on 29 February 1964. The four stands were named after the roads they were positioned on: The North, East, South and West stands were called Cuckoo Lane, Osler Road, London Road and Beech Road respectively.

In the 1990s, the Taylor Report was published calling for the improvement of football stadiums. The Manor Ground's terracing was becoming redundant and redeveloping the ground was too costly, so the club decided to move to a purpose-built all-seater stadium on the outskirts of the city, costing in the region of £15 million. Construction work began in the early part of 1997, but was suspended later that year due to the club's financial problems. Construction of the new stadium resumed in 1999 following a takeover deal and the last league match at the Manor on 1 May 2001 saw a 1–1 draw with Port Vale. The site was sold for £12 million and the stadium was later demolished. The land is now occupied by a private hospital.

Since 2001, Oxford United have played at the Kassam Stadium. The all-seater stadium has a capacity of 12,500 and has only three stands instead of the usual four; when first planned in 1995 it was originally going to have a 16,000-seat capacity, but by the time the stadium opened Oxford were playing in a lower division, so the smaller capacity was deemed adequate. Construction of the fourth stand is not expected to take place, with the club focussing its plans on building a new stadium instead, although it did seem like a possibly at one stage, with foundations having already been put in place. The record attendance is 12,243, which was achieved in the final game of the 2005–06 season, when a defeat against Leyton Orient condemned them to relegation from the Football League. The average attendance in the previous season was 7,415, which was the second highest in League Two and the thirty-fourth highest in the whole Football League. The average attendance was highest in the Conference in two out of the four years the team spent in the division, with the average in the other two years placing second, behind Exeter City and Cambridge United respectively. The stadium has also hosted rugby union matches, a woman's international football match (England v Sweden), an Under-17 international football tournament and music concerts.

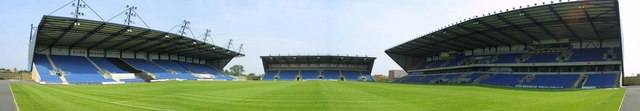
Oxford's current ground, Kassam Stadium, from the open end

In 2021, the club approached Oxfordshire County Council (OCC) and requested that it transfer c. 18 hectares (44.48 acres) of land for the development of a new 18,000-capacity football stadium with ancillary leisure and commercial facilities to include, hotel, retail, conference, and training/community grounds on Oxford Green Belt land at Stratfield Brake near Kidlington. On 18 January 2022, OCC recommended an engagement exercise be carried out first to gather feedback from the local community. The survey was heavily publicised by Oxvox with respondents completing the survey from areas such as Orkney Islands. Among local residents, 38 per cent were in favour, while 58 per cent were against.

In January 2023, the County Council Cabinet agreed to enter into negotiations on plans to build the stadium at a different site in Kidlington known as the Triangle, between Frieze Way and Oxford Road south of Kidlington roundabout and east of the original Stratfield Brake site. OCC's cabinet consented to lease the proposed site to the club and, in February 2024, Oxford United unveiled plans to build a new 'all-electric', 16,000-seat stadium on the site, with proposed pedestrian access from Oxford Parkway railway station, to open in 2026. The club's architect, AFL, submitted its full planning application for the scheme on 1 March 2024, with the new ground likely to cost up to £150 million. In June 2024, a decision on the application was postponed to early 2025 to allow further work on the proposals to "provide further clarity" for the planning committee. As a result, the club may need to find a temporary home after their lease at the Kassam expires. In May 2025, a short-term extension was agreed between the club and Firoka Group to allow them to play at the stadium up to 2028, conditional on planning permission for the proposed new stadium being granted (Cherwell District Council will not make a decision on the plans until June 2025 at the earliest). In July 2025, questions were raised about the Triangle location after a nearby area was initially designated as ancient woodland. On 6 August 2025, following an appeal to Natural England which found that the woodland in question could not be properly deemed "ancient" as it was not found on contemporary maps, Cherwell District Council recommended that the site be approved, and planning permission was granted on 14 August 2025. Final approval of the club's plans followed in February 2026.

== Support ==
Oxford's average league attendances since 1963

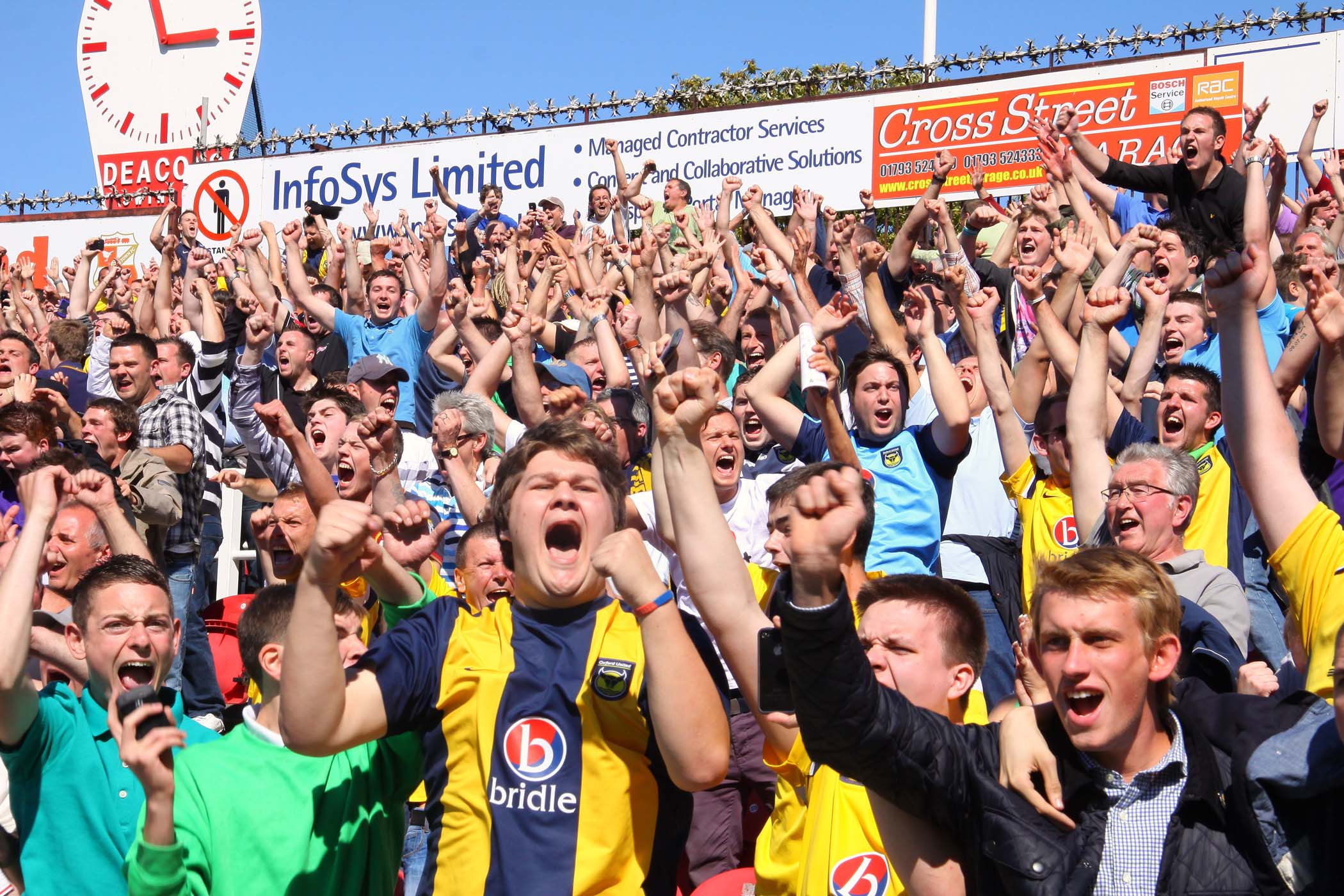
Oxford United supporters

Oxford have a number of independent supporters' clubs and groups such as OxVox (the Oxford United Supporters' Trust) with a current membership of over 400, and the Oxford United Exiles. OxVox was formed in 2002, to replace the disbanded FOUL group, which broke up after the immediate future of the club was secured. It was the fiftieth supporters trust created under the Supporters' trust banner. The club itself also runs a Juniors club, aimed at younger fans and offering a number of bonuses to the club's members such as birthday cards and a free T-shirt. The official matchday programme for home games costs £4 and was voted best Conference Premier Programme of the Year for the 2007–08 season. A number of songs are sung during home games, such as "Yellow Submarine" (with adapted lyrics) and songs relating to the old Manor Ground.

The club have a number of celebrity supporters, including Timmy Mallett, Tim Henman and Jim Rosenthal. The club's mascot is Ollie the Ox. United were the best-supported club in the Conference National before Luton Town joined the division, and the home match between Oxford and Luton, which drew a crowd of 10,600, was used to highlight the passion for English football during the 2018 World Cup bid. In 2009, a "12th man fund" was set up by a group of supporters in order to provide additional transfer funds to the club. As a result, the number 12 shirt was retired at the start of the 2009–10 season (though it was reintroduced in 2018–19). The fund raised over £40,000 and resulted in the signings of Mehdi Kerrouche (on loan) and Jamie Cook, amongst others.

=== Rivalries ===
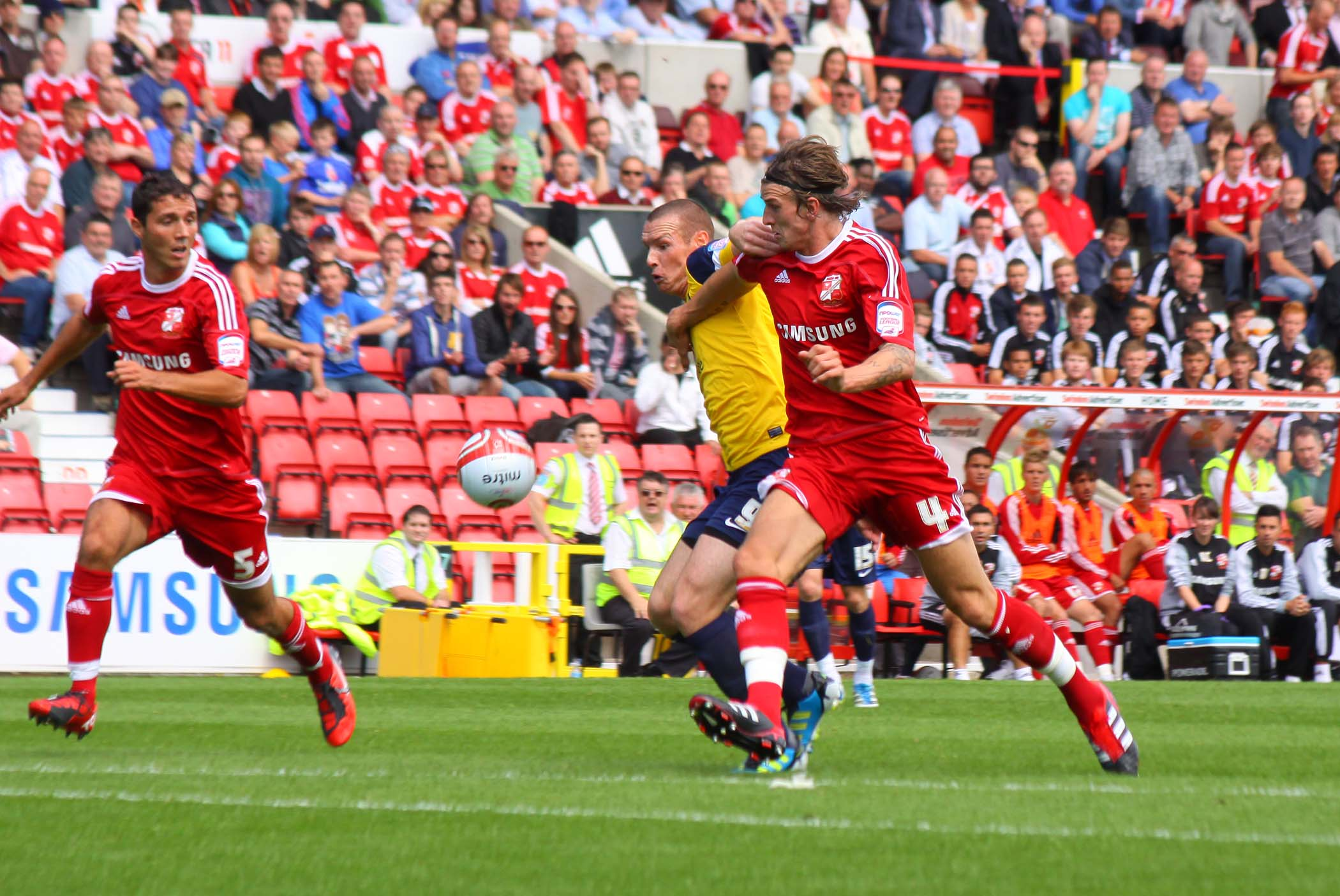
Oxford United playing against rivals Swindon Town, in a game known as the A420 derby, in August 2011

Oxford United's fiercest rivalry is with Swindon Town; matches between the two are referred to as the A420 derby, a primary road between both cities, which are only 30 miles (48 km) apart. There also exists a rivalry between Oxford and Reading. The rivalry with Swindon stems from the clubs' close proximity, as well as the fact they have played each other 55 times since 1962. Oxford and Swindon met a few times in non-competitive fixtures before 1962. The earliest match on record was a friendly in the 1950–51 season at Headington. They also played each other in 1954–55 both home and away, and at Headington during 1958–59. All programmes are fairly scarce, with the single sheet issued at Swindon being very rare. The 1962–63 game was a testimonial, with the first league meetings coming in 1965–66.

During the height of football hooliganism, trouble flared up between the sets of fans. In 1998, during a match at the County Ground, 19 Swindon supporters were arrested, while in 2002 there was an incident between supporters after Oxford fans returned from an away fixture. In 2011, vandals burned the initials STFC into the Kassam Stadium's pitch. Oxford fans refer to their Swindon rivals as moonrakers, in reference to the myth that they tried to rake the reflection of the moon out of a pond. The rivalry with Reading was heightened during the chairmanship of Robert Maxwell, because of his desire to merge the two clubs. This was met with strong opposition from both sets of fans, with United supporters staging a "sit-in" on the pitch before a game against Wigan in protest. Despite being the second team in the city, there is less rivalry with Oxford City because of their lower position in the pyramid system (there have been no competitive league matches between the two since 1959).

== Players ==
=== First-team squad ===
As of 28 October 2026

Note: Flags indicate national team as defined under FIFA eligibility rules; some limited exceptions apply. Players may hold more than one non-FIFA nationality.

No.	Pos.	Nation	Player
1	GK	ENG	Jamie Cumming
2	DF	ENG	Sam Long
3	DF	NIR	Ciaron Brown
4	MF	WAL	Kai Andrews (on loan from Coventry City)
5	DF	ENG	Frankie Kent
6	DF	POL	Michał Helik
7	FW	KOR	Jeon Jin-woo
8	MF	ENG	Cameron Brannagan (captain)
9	FW	WAL	Mark Harris
10	FW	IRL	Aidomo Emakhu
11	MF	IRL	Tyler Goodrham
12	DF	NED	Ruben Roosken
13	GK	ENG	Simon Eastwood
15	DF	NIR	Brodie Spencer

No.	Pos.	Nation	Player
18	MF	NIR	Jamie McDonnell
19	FW	ENG	Gatlin O'Donkor
20	FW	ENG	Luka Lynch (on loan from Aston Villa)
22	DF	JAM	Greg Leigh
23	FW	CIV	Siriki Dembélé
25	DF	IRL	James Golding
26	DF	ENG	Jack Currie
27	FW	ENG	Leo Snowden
30	DF	COD	Peter Kioso
32	MF	ENG	Louie Sibley
37	MF	ENG	Aidan Elliott-Wheeler
41	GK	ENG	Monty Marriott
44	MF	ENG	Harrison Bradney
57	FW	ENG	Mo Missanga

==== Out on loan ====
Note: Flags indicate national team as defined under FIFA eligibility rules; some limited exceptions apply. Players may hold more than one non-FIFA nationality.

No.	Pos.	Nation	Player
11	FW	IDN	Ole Romeny (at Fortuna Sittard until 30 June 2027)
14	MF	BEL	Brian De Keersmaecker (at Bristol City until 30 June 2027)

=== Reserves and academy ===
Note: Flags indicate national team as defined under FIFA eligibility rules; some limited exceptions apply. Players may hold more than one non-FIFA nationality.

No.	Pos.	Nation	Player
45	FW	ENG	Jack Lee
46	DF	ENG	Aaron Lacey
48	DF	WAL	Louis Griffiths
52	DF	ENG	Charlie Cramond
54	MF	ENG	Josh Holton
59	MF	ENG	Maeson Vaughan
65	DF	ENG	Albie Collins
—	GK	ENG	Ajae Patel
—	GK	ENG	Harry Jones
—	GK	ENG	Will Jackson

No.	Pos.	Nation	Player
—	DF	ENG	Rashane Maxwell
—	DF	ENG	Woodley Osborne
—	DF	ENG	Cameron Frederick
—	DF	ENG	Harley Gardner
—	MF	ENG	Calum Doyle
—	MF	ENG	Callum Palmer-Flynn
—	MF	ENG	Kevin Appiah
—	FW	ENG	Kasway Burton
—	FW	ENG	Kesh Purcell
—	FW	ENG	Riley Dourish

== Oxford United W.F.C. ==
Oxford United Women's Football Club was founded as Oxford Ladies F.C. in the 1991–92 season. Its inaugural season was in 1991–92, and it was formally affiliated to Oxford United F.C. before the start of the following season, at which point the name was changed to Oxford United Ladies. It was renamed Oxford United Women F.C. a year later. The team adopted a hybrid-professional model in June 2025.

The women's first XI currently plays in Women's National League South, and plays its homes games at Marsh Lane in Marston, the home of non-league Oxford City.

== Management and staff ==
=== Current staff ===
Position	Name
Head coach	(Wales) Aaron Ramsey
Assistant coaches	(Wales) Chris Gunter
Assistant coaches	(Wales) Tom Hutton
First-team goalkeeping coach	(Wales) Lewis Price
First-team coach analyst	(England) Joe Moore
Head of performance	(England) Nick Meace
First-team performance coaches	(England) Luke Taylor
First-team performance coaches	(England) Dwayne Peasah
First-team performance analyst	(England) Isaac Alder
Head of medical services	(England) Dan Simm
Club doctor	(England) James Baldock
Sport therapist	(England) John Elliot
Academy manager	(England) James Constable

=== Club personnel ===
Position	Name
Owner	(Indonesia) Erick Thohir
Chairman	(Serbia) Dusan Bogdanovic
Chief Executive Officer	(England) Tim Williams
Director of Football	(England) Ed Waldron
Football Adviser	(England) Derek Fazackerley
Secretary	(England) Vanessa Gomm

== Managers ==
The first manager appointed was Harry Thompson in July 1949, soon after the club turned professional. In a nine-year tenure he led the team to the Southern League title in 1953, as well as the Southern League Cup in 1953 and 1954. He was replaced by Arthur Turner in 1958, who would become the longest-serving manager in the club's history, serving more than a decade in charge. Turner led United to back-to-back Southern League titles, of which the second, in 1962, resulted in their election to the Football League. Promotion followed from the Fourth Division in 1965, and the club was crowned Third Division champions three years later. Turner left the club nine months after this success. Over the next thirteen years, five managers took charge. Ron Saunders was in charge for only a dozen games, moving to Norwich City at the end of the 1968–69 season. Gerry Summers was manager for six years, before being replaced by Mick Brown. During Brown's four-year run, United were relegated back to the Third Division after spending eight years in the Second.

Jim Smith started his first spell as manager in 1981, and led Oxford into the top tier of English football after consecutive promotions as champions in 1984 and 1985. However, he moved to Queens Park Rangers before the 1985–86 season. New manager, former chief scout Maurice Evans, had immediate success winning the 1986 League Cup, beating his predecessor's new club in the final. For the next 24 years, the only manager to guide the club to promotion was Denis Smith, who won promotion from the Second Division in 1996. Ramón Díaz, the club's first non-British manager, took charge for five months between December 2004 and May 2005. Jim Smith returned as manager in 2006, the year that Oxford United were relegated to the Football Conference after 44 years in the Football League. Having missed out on promotion in the 2006–07 season, Smith resigned and Darren Patterson was promoted to the post on 9 November 2007.

Patterson was dismissed in December 2008 and was replaced by Chris Wilder, who led the club back into the Football League by winning the 2010 Conference playoff Final and remained with the club for five years before resigning in January 2014. Gary Waddock was appointed head coach in March 2014, but was dismissed in July following a change of shareholding in the club, to be replaced by Michael Appleton. In his three seasons in charge, Appleton oversaw promotion to League One and two losing finals in the EFL Trophy, before leaving to become assistant manager at Leicester City. Spaniard Pep Clotet was appointed as his replacement but was dismissed midway through his first season in charge, to be replaced after a two-month spell under caretaker-manager Derek Fazackerley by former Charlton manager Karl Robinson in March 2018. Robinson was dismissed in February 2023 following a poor run of results and, after a short period under caretaker management and a brief period under the management of Liam Manning, Des Buckingham was appointed as manager and he led the club to promotion to the Championship after a 25-year absence. Buckingham was dismissed on 15 December 2024 later to be replaced by former Millwall manager Gary Rowett, who in turn was dismissed after a year in charge.

Since turning professional, the club has had 26 full-time managers, of whom three (Jim Smith, Denis Smith and Darren Patterson) have had more than one spell in the post, and 12 periods of caretaker-management.

== Statistics and records ==
Chart of historic table positions since election to the Football League

The largest recorded home attendance was during a match against Preston North End in the sixth round of the FA Cup, at the Manor Ground, on 29 February 1964. The attendance was 22,750, which exceeded the stadium's capacity, so scaffolding was needed in order to create temporary stands for the additional supporters. The largest attendance at the Kassam Stadium for a football match was 12,243 during the final game of the 2005–06 League Two season against Leyton Orient. Oxford's largest-ever scoreline was a 9–1 win in the FA Cup first round against Dorchester Town on 11 November 1995. In the league, their largest victory was a 7–0 win against Barrow in Division Four. Their largest defeat is 7–0 away to Sunderland in 1998 and to Wigan Athletic in 2017. Their longest unbeaten run in the league was 20 matches in 1984, with their record longest winning run of nine games in the 2020–21 season.

John Shuker holds the record for the most league appearances with 478 between 1962 and 1977. John Aldridge holds the record for most league goals scored in a season in the 1984–85 season, scoring 30. Graham Atkinson holds the record for the most league goals with 77, as well as most overall goals with 107. The most capped player in internationals is Jim Magilton, with 18 caps for Northern Ireland. The largest amount of money Oxford have received by selling a player was an estimated £3,000,000 for Kemar Roofe's transfer to Leeds United in July 2016. The largest transfer fee Oxford have paid was £470,000 for Dean Windass' transfer from Aberdeen in August 1998, though the undisclosed fee paid for Marvin Johnson at the start of the 2016–17 season is thought to have exceeded this figure. Oxford are the only team in history to have been promoted consecutively from Division Three to the First Division as champions.

== Honours ==
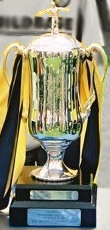
Club's first League Cup trophy from the 1985–86 edition

League

- Second Division (level 2)
  - Champions: 1984–85
- Third Division / Second Division / League One (level 3)
  - Champions: 1967–68, 1983–84
  - Runners-up: 1995–96
  - Play-off winners: 2024
- Fourth Division / League Two (level 4)
  - Runners-up: 2015–16
  - Promoted: 1964–65
- Conference (level 5)
  - Play-off winners: 2010
- Southern League
  - Champions: 1952–53, 1960–61, 1961–62
  - Runners-up: 1953–54, 1959–60

Cup

- League Cup
  - Winners: 1985–86
- Football League Trophy / EFL Trophy
  - Runners-up: 2015–16, 2016–17
- Southern League Cup
  - Winners: 1952–53, 1953–54
- Piala Presiden
  - Runners-up: 2025 Piala Presiden

== Bibliography ==
- Bickerton, Bob (1998). Club Colours. Hamlyn. ISBN 0-600-59542-0.
- Howland, Andy and Roger (1989). Oxford United: A Complete Record (1893–1989). Breedon Books. ISBN 0-907969-52-6.
- Brodetsky, Martin (2009). Oxford United: The Complete Record. Breedon Books. ISBN 978-1-85983-715-3.
