= Nick Merry =

British businessman

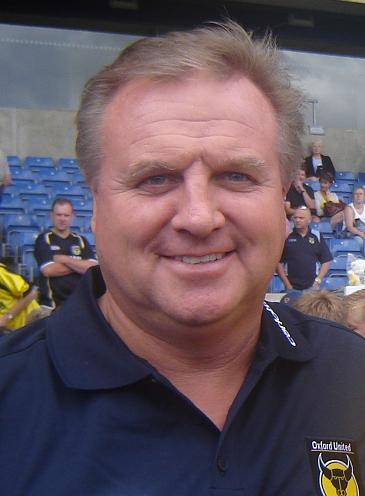

Personal information
- Full name: Nicholas Merry
- Date of birth: 1961 or 1962
- Place of birth: Woodstock, England

Senior career*
Years	Team	Apps	(Gls)
?–1979	Oxford United		
1979	Norwich City		
1979–1982	Witney Town		
1983–?	Kansas City Comets		
- * Club domestic league appearances and goals

Nicholas Merry is a British businessman who active in the United States who ran a now defunct Florida-based dental biotechnology company called MicroDenteX as well as investing in gemstones in Guinea.

Until 2 October 2008, Merry was chairman of Oxford United Football Club, the club he has supported all his life. He played youth football for the club in the 1970s before a knee injury ended his career prematurely. He also played football for England at schoolboy level.

Merry was part of Woodstock Partners Limited (or WPL), a consortium headed up by Ian Lenagan that bought the club for £1 from former chairman Firoz Kassam.
