= Manor Ground (Oxford) =

Former football stadium in Oxford, England

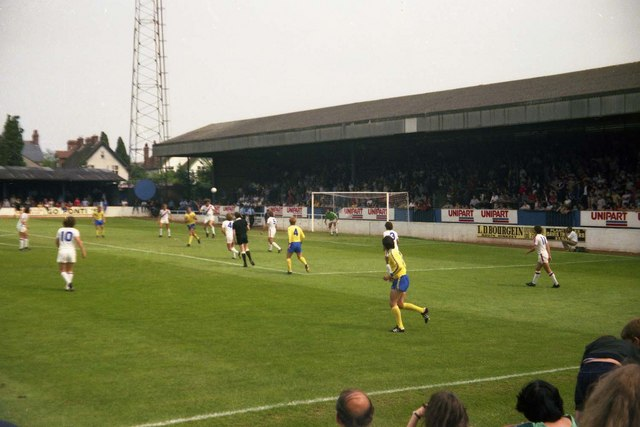
- London Road terrace

- Location within Oxfordshire
- Location: London Road, Headington, Oxford, England
- Coordinates: 51°45′38″N 1°12′55″W
- Owner: Oxford United F.C.
- Capacity: 9,500
- Surface: Grass

Construction
- Built: 1925
- Opened: 1925
- Expanded: 1946
- Closed: 2001
- Demolished: 2001

Tenant
- Oxford United F.C. (1925–2001)

The Manor Ground was a football stadium in Oxford, England, the home of Oxford United (previously known as Headington United) between 1925 and 2001. It hosted United's record crowd of 22,750 against Preston North End in an FA Cup 6th Round match on 29 February 1964.

The main seating stand was the Beech Road stand (on the west), the 'home' terracing was the London Road stand (south), the 'away' terracing was Cuckoo Lane (north), and on the fourth side was the Osler Road stand (east). In 1966, with the demolition of Sandfield Cottage, a new entrance to the ground was created onto London Road.

With the advent of the 1990s and the Taylor Report, the Manor Ground's terracing was rapidly becoming antiquated, and it gained a reputation amongst fans as one of the more dilapidated stadiums in English professional football. The location of the Manor Ground was unsuitable for conversion into an all-seater stadium, so the club decided to move to a purpose-built all-seater stadium (later to be named the Kassam Stadium) on the outskirts of the city, on land near the Blackbird Leys housing estate. Construction work began in the early part of 1997, but was suspended later that year because of the club's financial problems. Construction of the new stadium resumed in 1999 following a takeover deal and Oxford moved there in 2001.

The last league match at the Manor, on 1 May 2001, was a 1–1 draw with Port Vale. Andy Scott opened the scoring after 82 minutes as the Us looked set for a final home victory, but a minute from the end Tony Naylor equalised. Oxford's final season at the Manor Ground was one of the worst in their history: the club finished bottom of Division Two with 27 points and were relegated to Division Three, their lowest standing in 35 years.

The stadium was later demolished and is now the site of The Manor Hospital, a private hospital owned and operated by Nuffield Health.

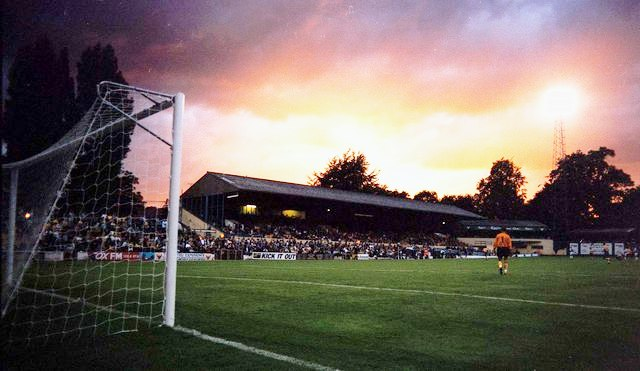
The Beech Road stand (seating)

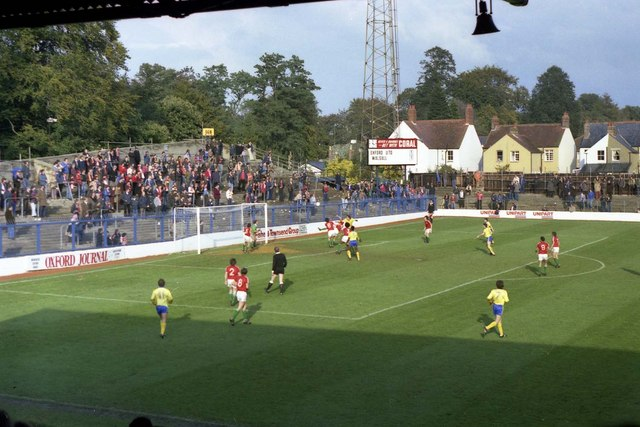
The Cuckoo Lane end
