= List of Oxford United F.C. players =

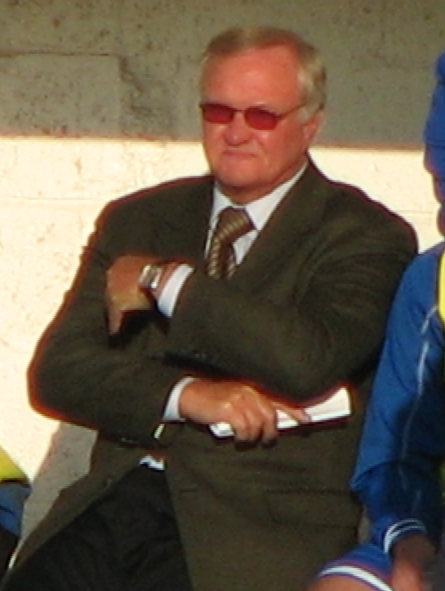
Ron Atkinson played a record 560 matches for Oxford United.

Oxford United Football Club is an English professional association football club based in Oxford. As of the 2022–23 season, the team plays in the League One, which is the third level of the English football league system. The club was formed in 1893 as Headington before adding the suffix United six years later to become Headington United F.C. The club retained this name until 1960, when it was changed to Oxford United to give it a higher profile. The club was elected into the Southern Football League in 1949, where they stayed until replacing Accrington Stanley in the Football League in 1962. The club spent 44 years in the Football League, reaching the First Division at the end of the 1984–85 season and spending three years in the top tier. Oxford United spent four years in non-league football, before being promoted through the play-offs at the end of the 2009–10 season.

Ron Atkinson made 560 appearances, including 125 matches in the Southern League (a semi-professional league). John Shuker, the man who succeeded Atkinson as captain, made a total of 534 appearances with 478 in the Football League. He holds the club record for the most league appearances and the most overall appearances since 1962, when Oxford joined the Football League. Graham Atkinson holds the record for league goals scored with 97, as well as being the all-time top goalscorer, netting 107 times. Irish forward John Aldridge holds two records, the first being the most league goals scored in a season with 30, and the second the most goals scored in a season with 34. Both of these were set during the 1984–85 season, the year Oxford was promoted to the First Division. David Sloan made his international debut in 1968 for Northern Ireland, becoming the first of twenty players to receive an international cap while playing for the club. Of the players in this list, 119 are from the United Kingdom, five from Ireland, and five are from the rest of the world.

== List of players ==
The list comprises players with 100 or more appearances and those who have received international caps while at the club or hold a club record, since 1949 when the club turned professional. Appearances and goals are for matches in the Football League, Conference National, Southern League, FA Cup, Football League Cup, Football League Trophy, Football League Group Cup, Anglo-Italian Cup, Full Members' Cup, FA Trophy and Southern League Cup. Substitute appearances are included. Statistics correct as of 21 March 2021. Players marked in bold are still playing for the club.

* International appearances while at club.
Club record holder.

Name	Nationality	Position^{[A]}	Oxford United career^{[B]}	Appearances	Goals	Records	Notes^{[C]}
John Aldridge	Republic of Ireland*	Forward	1984–1987	141	90	^{[E]}	
Chris Allen	England	Midfielder	1991–1996	181	17		
Jack Ansell	England	Goalkeeper	1952–1955	149	0		
Andre Arendse	South Africa*	Goalkeeper	1999–2000	19	0		^{[D]}
Jon Ashton	England	Defender	2003–2006	103	1		
Graham Atkinson	England	Forward	1959–1974	398	107	^{[F]}^{[G]}	
Ron Atkinson	England	Midfielder	1959–1971	560	21	^{[H]}	
Steve Aylott	England	Defender	1971–1975	167	9		
Shandon Baptiste	Grenada*	Midfielder	2017–2020	43	5		
Jim Barron	England	Goalkeeper	1966–1970	165	0		
Steve Basham	England	Forward	2002–2007	187	49		
Damian Batt	England	Defender	2009–2013	181	3		
Joey Beauchamp	England	Midfielder	1989–1994; 1995–2002	429	78		
Cyril Beavon	England	Defender	1959–1969	464	11		
Paul Berry	England	Midfielder	1977–1982	121	20		
Andy Bodel	Scotland	Defender	1975–1980	141	11		
Matthew Bound	England	Defender	2001–2004	111	2		
**Cameron Brannagan**	England	Midfielder	2018–	131	14		
Gary Briggs	England	Defender	1978–1989	508	22		
Max Briggs	England	Midfielder	1974–1977	105	1		
Kevin Brock	England	Midfielder	1979–1987	305	32		
Roy Burton	England	Goalkeeper	1971–1982	447	0		
Nigel Cassidy	England	Forward	1970–1974	135	34		
Jeremy Charles	Wales*	Forward	1985–1986	56	16		
Colin Clarke	Scotland	Defender	1966–1978	497	26		
Derek Clarke	England	Forward	1970–1976	195	40		
Ryan Clarke	England	Goalkeeper	2009–2015	267	0		
James Constable	England	Forward	2008–2014	280	106		
Jamie Cook	England	Forward	1997–2000; 2009–2010	104	10		^{[D]}
Bobby Craig	England	Defender	1951–1955	189	10		
Johnnie Crichton	England	Defender	1951–1955	185	24		
Andy Crosby	England	Defender	2001–2004	122	13		
Hugh Curran	Scotland	Forward	1972–1978	121	43		
Craig Davies	Wales*	Forward	2004–2006	55	8		^{[D]}
Geoff Denial	England	Defender	1956–1962	194	51		
Rob Dickie	England	Defender	2018–2020	113	13		
Bobby McDonald	Scotland	Defender	1983–1987	125	21		
Ben Duncan	England	Forward	1950–1955	187	30		
Colin Duncan	England	Midfielder	1974–1980	207	7		
John Durnin	England	Midfielder	1989–1993	180	47		
**Simon Eastwood**	England	Goalkeeper	2016–	215	0		
Matt Elliott	Scotland	Defender	1993–1997	181	24	^{[I]}	
Ceri Evans	New Zealand*	Defender	1989–1993	130	3		^{[D]}
John Evanson	England	Forward	1966–1974	179	11		
Harry Fearnley	England	Goalkeeper	1963–1966	104	0		
**Marselino Ferdinan**	Indonesia*	Midfielder	2024–	0	0		
David Fogg	England	Defender	1976–1985	336	21		
Peter Foley	England	Forward	1975–1983	321	90		
Bobby Ford	England	Midfielder	1993–1997; 2002–2003	190	12		
Mike Ford	England	Defender	1988–1998; 2000	339	22		
Luke Foster	England	Defender	2007–2010	117	3		^{[D]}
Steve Foster	England	Defender	1989–1992	113	12		
Martin Foyle	England	Forward	1987–1991	151	44		
Kevin Francis	Saint Kitts and Nevis*	Forward	1998–2000	35	7		^{[D]}
Ray Gaston	Northern Ireland*	Forward	1968–1969	13	2		
Adriel Jared George	Antigua and Barbuda*	Midfielder	2014–2016	4	0		
Phil Gilchrist	England	Defender	1995–1999; 2006–2007	248	12		
Martin Gray	England	Midfielder	1996–1999	134	4		
Phil Gray	Northern Ireland*	Forward	2000–2002	48	13		^{[D]}
Chris Hackett	England	Midfielder	2000–2006	142	9		
Rob Hall	England	Forward	2011; 2016–2021	112	25		
Billy Hamilton	Northern Ireland*	Forward	1984–1987	41	20		
Steve Hardwick	England	Goalkeeper	1983–1988	196	0		
Tony Harper	England	Defender	1955–1959	136	6		
Colin Harrington	England	Midfielder	1963–1971	260	30		
Trevor Hebberd	England	Midfielder	1982–1988	326	43		
James Henry	England	Midfielder	2017–2024	174	44		
Brian Houghton	England	Forward	1961–1963	114	75		
Ray Houghton	Republic of Ireland*	Midfielder	1985–1987	105	14		
Ernie Hudson	England	Defender	1952–1957	109	1		
Danny Hylton	England	Forward	2014–2016	101	30		
Billy Jeffrey	Scotland	Midfielder	1973–1982	356	26		
Nigel Jemson	England	Forward	1996–1998; 2000	100	33		
Mark Jones	England	Midfielder	1980–1986	157	7		
Tony Jones	England	Midfielder	1959–1967	356	100		
Alan Judge	England	Goalkeeper	1985–1991; 2003–2004	102	0		^{[D]}
Mick Kearns	Republic of Ireland*	Goalkeeper	1969–1972	78	0		
Paul Kee	Northern Ireland*	Goalkeeper	1989–1993	64	0		^{[D]}
Peter Knight	England	Midfielder	1960–1964	200	33		
Maurice Kyle	England	Defender	1959–1969	448	4		
David Langan	Republic of Ireland*	Defender	1984–1987	136	3		
George Lawrence	England	Midfielder	1982–1984	101	27		
Mickey Lewis	England	Defender	1988–2000	350	7		
**Sam Long**	England	Defender	2012–	120	6		
Johnny Love	England	Midfielder	1955–1963	316	40		
Dick Lucas	England	Defender	1967–1975	219	4		
John Lundstram	England	Midfielder	2015–2017	104	4		
Hugh McGrogan	England	Midfielder	1975–1980	141	15		
Jim Magilton	Northern Ireland*	Midfielder	1990–1994	173	42		
Stuart Massey	England	Midfielder	1994–1998	129	13		
Owen Medlock	England	Goalkeeper	1959–1963	133	0		
Andy Melville	Wales*	Defender	1990–1993	159	15		
Paul Moody	England	Forward	1994–1997; 2001–2002	197	75		^{[D]}
John Mousinho	England	Defender	2017–2023	132	3		
John Mullins	England	Defender	2012–2016	149	9		
Matt Murphy	England	Midfielder	1993–2001	290	55		
Curtis Nelson	England	Defender	2016–2019	121	8		
Callum O'Dowda	Republic of Ireland*	Midfielder	2013–2016	106	14		
Yemi Odubade	Nigeria	Forward	2006–2009	130	31		
David Penney	England	Forward	1989–1994	129	16		
Les Phillips	England	Midfielder	1984–1993	224	15		^{[D]}
Alfie Potter	England	Midfielder	2009–2015	194	28		
Paul Powell	England	Midfielder	1995–2003	200	23		
Pat Quartermain	England	Defender	1955–1967	306	0		
Barry Quinn	Republic of Ireland	Midfielder	2004–2009	199	6		
Frank Ramshaw	England	Defender	1950–1958	358	1		
Billy Rees	Wales	Forward	1955–1959	122	58		
Peter Rhoades-Brown	England	Midfielder	1984–1988	142	16		
Dave Roberts	Wales*	Defender	1971–1975	176	8		
Les Robinson	England	Defender	1990–2000	459	6		
Matthew Robinson	England	Defender	2002–2006	192	4		
Danny Rose	England	Midfielder	2007–2008; 2013–2016	143	10		
Josh Ruffels	England	Various	2013–2021	307	21		
David Rush	England	Forward	1994–1996	110	24		
Dean Saunders	Wales*	Forward	1987–1988	73	33		
Jason Seacole	England	Midfielder	1976–1982	134	26		
Liam Sercombe	England	Midfielder	2015–2017	101	22		
Malcolm Shotton	England	Defender	1980–1987	338	15		
John Shuker	England	Forward	1962–1977	534	47	^{[J]}	
Paul Simpson	England	Midfielder	1988–1992	168	50		
Joe Skarz	England	Defender	2015–2017	107	0		
Ken Skeen	England	Various	1967–1974	270	40		
Neil Slatter	Wales*	Defender	1985–1989	115	9		
David Sloan	Northern Ireland*	Forward	1968–1973	200	34	^{[K]}	
Gary Smart	England	Defender	1988–1994	204	0		^{[D]}
Dave Smith	England	Midfielder	1994–1999	231	4		
Jim Smith	England	Midfielder	1949–1955	143	22		
Tim Smithers	England	Midfielder	1980–1983	124	7		
Rodney Smithson	England	Midfielder	1965–1974	180	6		
Ronnie Steel	England	Midfielder	1952–1955	130	32		
Paul Tait	England	Midfielder	1999–2002	105	3		
Les Taylor	England	Midfielder	1975–1980	239	16		
Andy Thomas	England	Midfielder	1981–1986	150	45		
Cyril Toulouse	England	Midfielder	1950–1954	152	20		
John Trewick	England	Midfielder	1984–1987	142	4		
Billy Turley	England	Goalkeeper	2005–2010	186	0		^{[D]}
Paul Wanless	England	Midfielder	1991–1995; 2003–2005	109	7		
Mark Watson	Canada*	Defender	1998–2000	69	0		^{[D]}
Dean Windass	England	Forward	1998–1999	38	18	^{[L]}	
Andy Whing	England	Midfielder	2011–2015	111	2		
Dean Whitehead	England	Midfielder	1999–2004	136	9		
Phil Whitehead	England	Goalkeeper	1993–1998	238	0		
Gavin Whyte	Republic of Ireland*	Defender	2018–2019	47	9		
Alan Willey	England	Forward	1961–1966	128	48		
Andy Woodman	England	Goalkeeper	2002–2004	112	0		
Jake Wright	England	Defender	2010–2016	281	0		^{[M]}
Harry Yates	England	Midfielder	1952–1955	103	54		

== Footnotes ==
A. For a full description of positions see Association football positions.

B. The dates for the career represent the first and last first team appearances. When there are two sets of dates, the second set represents a player's second spell at the club.

C. Unless otherwise stated, appearances and goals taken from Howland, Andy and Roger (1989). Oxford United: A Complete Record (1893–1989). Breedon Books. ISBN 0-907969-52-6.

D. Statistics taken from Brodetsky, Martin (2009). Oxford United, The Complete Record. Breedon Books. ISBN 978-1-85983-715-3.

E. John Aldridge holds the club record for the most league goals scored in a season with 30, and the most goals scored in a season, 34, during the 1984–85 season.

F. Graham Atkinson holds the club record for the most goals scored with 107.

G. Graham Atkinson holds the club record for the most league goals scored with 97.

H. Ron Atkinson holds the club record for the most overall appearances in all competitions (including matches in the Southern League) with 560.

I. Matt Elliott holds the club record for the highest transfer fee received of £1,600,000 from Leicester City in 1997.

J. John Shuker holds the club record for the most league appearances, with 478, and the most overall appearances (excluding matches in the Southern League), with 534.

K. David Sloan was the first Oxford United player to play a full international, for Northern Ireland in 1968.

L. Dean Windass holds the club record for the highest transfer fee paid of £470,000 to Aberdeen in 1998.

M. Soccerbase does not include the three FA Trophy appearances.
