= List of Oxford United F.C. records and statistics =

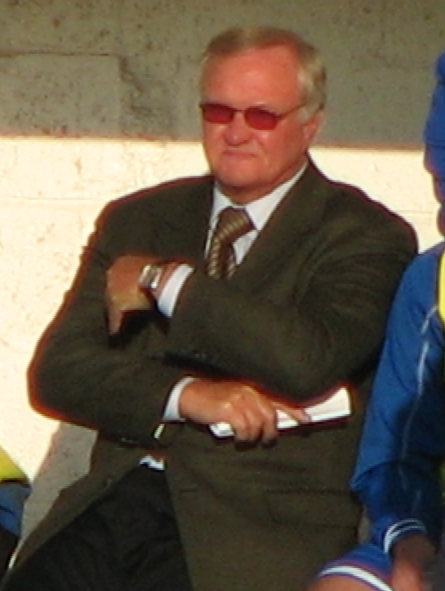
Ron Atkinson holds the club record for appearances, having made 560 between 1959 and 1971.

Oxford United is an English professional association football club based in Oxford, Oxfordshire. They play in The Championship, the second level of the English football league system, as of the 2024–25 season. The club was formed in 1893 as Headington United, before changing its name (to Oxford United) in 1960, and has played home matches at two stadiums throughout its history, the Manor Ground until 2001, and the Kassam Stadium since. In 1986 they won their only major^{[A]} trophy, the League Cup. The club joined the Oxfordshire Senior League in 1921, before joining the Spartan League in 1947. Two years later the club moved to the Southern League, before being elected to the Football League in 1962. Oxford spent three years in the First Division between August 1985 and May 1988. At the end of the 2005–06 season, after 44 years in the League, United were relegated to the Football Conference. They returned to the League after winning the Conference National Play-off Final in 2010.

The record for most games played for the club is held by Ron Atkinson, who made 560 appearances between 1959 and 1971. John Shuker holds the record for the most appearances since they joined the Football League. Graham Atkinson is the club's record goalscorer, scoring 107 goals including 97 in the league. Jim Magilton holds the record for the most international caps gained as an Oxford player, having made 18 appearances for Northern Ireland. The highest transfer fee ever paid by the club is the £470,000 paid to Aberdeen for Dean Windass in 1998, though it has been reported that the undisclosed fee paid for Marvin Johnson in 2016 exceeded this amount, and the highest fee received is the estimated £3,000,000 paid by Leeds United for Kemar Roofe in 2016. The highest attendance recorded at the Manor Ground was 22,750 for the visit of Preston North End in the FA Cup, while the highest attendance at the Kassam is 12,243 against Leyton Orient.

== Honours and achievements ==
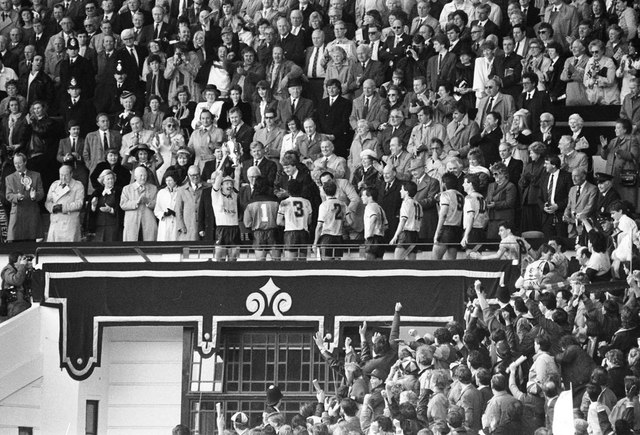
Malcolm Shotton lifts the League Cup at Wembley Stadium.

Oxford United's only major honour in English football is the League Cup, which the club won in the 1985–86 season, defeating Queen's Park Rangers in the final 3–0. The club has also won the Third Division championship twice and the Second Division championship once. The latter Third Division, Second Division and League Cup victories all occurred within the space of two years. United also achieved promotion from the Fourth Division after the 1964–65 season. Oxford's highest top-flight finish is eighteenth, which was achieved twice in two years, starting in 1986. Their most recent promotion occurred after the 2023–24 season, when they beat Bolton Wanderers 2–0 in the League One play-off final to secure promotion to the EFL Championship for the first time in 25 years.

Oxford's best performance in the FA Cup involved reaching the quarter-finals against Preston North End in the 1963–64 season. In doing so, they became the first team to reach that stage from the Fourth Division. Before the club were admitted to the Football League in 1962, they won the Southern Football League championship on three occasions, the final win occurring the season before election into the Fourth Division, and finished runner-up twice. They also won the Southern League Cup twice.

=== The Football League ===
- Before the Premier League
  - Second Division (level 2): Champions 1984–85
  - Third Division (level 3): Champions 1967–68, 1983–84
  - Fourth Division (level 4): Promoted (3rd) 1964–65
- After the formation of the Premier League
  - Division Two (level 3): Runners-up 1995–96
  - League Two (level 4): Runners-up 2015–16

=== Other honours ===
- Southern League
  - Premier Division: Champions 1952–53, 1960–61, 1961–62
  - Premier Division: Runners-up 1953–54, 1959–60
- Southern League Cup
  - Winners: 1952–53, 1953–54
- Football Conference
  - Conference National Play-off winners: 2009–10

=== National cup competitions ===
- FA Cup
  - Quarter finalists: 1963–64
- League Cup
  - Winners: 1986
- Football League Trophy
  - Runners-up: 2016, 2017

== Player records ==
=== Age ===
- Youngest first-team player: Leo Snowden, 15 years, 157 days (against Chelsea U21, 7 November 2023).
- Oldest first-team player: Alan Judge, 44 years, 176 days (against Southend United, 6 November 2004).

=== Appearances ===
Appearances are for matches in the Football League, Conference National, Southern League, FA Cup, Football League Cup, Football League Trophy, Football League Group Cup, Anglo-Italian Cup, Full Members Cup, FA Trophy and Southern League Cup. Substitute appearances are included in brackets. Statistics correct as of 8 March 2021.

#	Name	Position	Years	League^{a}	FA Cup	League Cup^{b}	Other^{c}	Total	Notes
1	Ron Atkinson	Midfielder	1959–1971	508 (1)	33 (0)	18 (0)	0 (0)	**559** (1)	
2	John Shuker	Defender	1962–1977	473 (5)	29 (0)	24 (0)	3 (0)	**529** (5)	
3	Gary Briggs	Defender	1978–1989	418 (2)	24 (0)	50 (0)	14 (0)	**506** (2)	
4	Colin Clarke	Defender	1966–1978	443 (1)	23 (0)	27 (0)	3 (0)	**496** (1)	
5	Cyril Beavon	Defender	1959–1969	416 (2)	27 (1)	18 (0)	0 (0)	**461** (3)	
6	Les Robinson	Defender	1990–2000	380 (5)	22 (0)	36 (0)	16 (0)	**454** (5)	
7	Maurice Kyle	Defender	1959–1969	403 (0)	26 (0)	19 (0)	0 (0)	**448** (0)	
8	Roy Burton	Goalkeeper	1971–1982	395 (0)	16 (0)	28 (0)	8 (0)	**447** (0)	
9	Joey Beauchamp	Midfielder	1989–1994; 1995–2002	321 (41)	21 (3)	26 (3)	9 (5)	**377** (52)	
10	Graham Atkinson	Forward	1959–1974	357 (4)	19 (0)	17 (0)	1 (0)	**394** (4)	

a. Includes Football League, Conference National and Southern Football League.
b. Includes Football League Cup and Southern League Cup.
c. Includes Football League Trophy, Football League Group Cup, Anglo-Italian Cup, Full Members Cup and FA Trophy.

=== Goalscorers ===
- Most goals in a season: Bud Houghton, 43 goals (including 39 Southern League goals) in the 1961–62 season.
- Most goals in a season during Football League membership: John Aldridge, 34 goals (including 30 League goals) in the 1984–85 season.
- Most Football League goals in a season: John Aldridge, 30 goals in Division Two in the 1984–85 season.
- Most goals in a Southern League match:
  - 5, Bud Houghton (against Boston United, 12 April 1961).
  - 5, Tony Jones (against Wisbech Town, 10 December 1960).
- Most goals in a Football League match: 4 goals, achieved by 6 players.

==== Top goalscorers ====
Goals are for matches in the Football League, Conference National, Southern League, FA Cup, Football League Cup, Football League Trophy, Football League Group Cup, Anglo-Italian Cup, Full Members Cup, FA Trophy, Conference League Cup and Southern League Cup. Appearances are included in brackets. Players in bold are current players. Statistics correct as of 23 May 2024.

#	Name	Position	Years	League^{a}	FA Cup	League Cup^{b}	Other^{c}	Total	Notes
1	Graham Atkinson	Forward	1959–1974	97 (361)	7 (19)	3 (17)	0 (1)	**107** (398)	
2	James Constable	Forward	2008–2014	90 (246)	7 (15)	2 (6)	7 (13)	**106** (280)	
3	Tony Jones	Midfielder	1959–1967	89 (318)	9 (24)	2 (14)	0 (0)	**100** (356)	
4	John Aldridge^{d}	Forward	1984–1987	72 (114)	2 (5)	14 (17)	2 (5)	**90** (141)	
5	Peter Foley	Forward	1975–1983	71 (277)	9 (13)	8 (27)	2 (14)	**90** (321)	
6	Joey Beauchamp	Midfielder	1989–1994; 1995–2002	64 (362)	4 (24)	10 (29)	0 (14)	**78** (429)	
7	Bud Houghton^{d}	Forward	1961–1963	69 (106)	5 (5)	1 (3)	0 (0)	**75** (114)	
8	Paul Moody	Forward	1994–1997; 2001–2002	63 (171)	5 (9)	4 (14)	3 (3)	**75** (197)	
9	Matty Taylor	Forward	2007–2009; 2019–2023	54 (123)	4 (10)	2 (5)	4 (11)	**64** (138)	
10	James Henry	Midfielder	2017–2024	51 (218)	3 (11)	1 (9)	3 (21)	**58** (259)	

a. Includes Football League, Conference National and Southern Football League.
b. Includes Football League Cup and Southern League Cup.
c. Includes Conference play-off, Football League Trophy, Football League Group Cup, Anglo-Italian Cup, Full Members Cup, FA Trophy and Conference League Cup.
d. Where two players scored the same number of goals, the player with the fewer appearances is listed first.

=== International caps ===
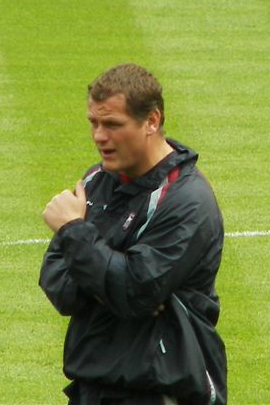
Jim Magilton, who made the most international appearances while at Oxford, with 18

- First capped player: David Sloan, for Northern Ireland on 10 September 1968 against Israel.
- Most international caps while an Oxford player: Jim Magilton, 18 for Northern Ireland

Player	Country	Caps while at club	Total caps
John Aldridge	(Republic of Ireland) Ireland	7	69
Andre Arendse	South Africa	11	67
Shandon Baptiste	Grenada	3	3
Ciaron Brown	Northern Ireland	16	23
Jeremy Charles	Wales	2	19
Craig Davies	Wales	2	7
Ceri Evans	New Zealand	7	85
Kevin Francis	(Saint Kitts and Nevis) St Kitts and Nevis	2	2
Ray Gaston	Northern Ireland	1	1
Adriel Jared George	Antigua and Barbuda	1	2
Phil Gray	Northern Ireland	2	26
Billy Hamilton	Northern Ireland	6	41
Ray Houghton	Republic of Ireland	12	73
Mick Kearns	Republic of Ireland	1	18
Paul Kee	Northern Ireland	7	9
Dave Langan	Republic of Ireland	11	25
Jim Magilton	Northern Ireland	18	52
Andy Melville	Wales	11	65
Callum O'Dowda	Republic of Ireland	1	5
Dave Roberts	Wales	6	17
Dean Saunders	Wales	6	75
Neil Slatter	Wales	12	22
David Sloan	Northern Ireland	2	2
Mark Watson	Canada	12	78
Gavin Whyte	Northern Ireland	4	10

=== Transfer fees ===
==== Record transfer fees paid ====
#	Player	From	Fee^{[B]}	Date	Notes
1	Siriki Dembélé	Birmingham City	£1–1.5 million	August 2024	
2	Marvin Johnson	Motherwell	£650,000	August 2016	^{[C]}
3	Dean Windass	Aberdeen	£470,000	July 1998	
4	Colin Greenall	Gillingham	£285,000	February 1988	
5	Andy Melville	Swansea City	£275,000	July 1990	
6	David Bardsley	Watford	£265,000	September 1987	
7	Richard Hill	Watford	£260,000	September 1987	
8	John Durnin	Liverpool	£250,000	February 1989	
9	Brian Wilsterman	Beerschot	£200,000	February 1997	
10	Paul Simpson	Manchester City	£200,000	October 1988	

==== Progressive transfer fee paid ====
Progressive transfer fee shows the chronological order in which the record transfer fee was set, and the transfer that set it.

Date	Player	Bought from	Fee
July 1949	Norman Aldridge	Northampton Town	£750
August 1949	Bert Kay	Bury	£1,000
March 1961	Bud Houghton	Southend United	£2,000
August 1962	Maurice Kyle	Wolves	£5,000^{[D]}
December 1962	Bernard Evans	QPR	£5,500
November 1963	Bill Calder	Bury	£8,500
June 1967	Mick Bullock	Birmingham City	£10,000
September 1968	Ray Gaston	Coleraine	£12,500
November 1970	Nigel Cassidy	Scunthorpe United	£20,000
September 1972	Hugh Curran	Wolves	£50,000
July 1974	Andy McCulloch	Cardiff City	£75,000
March 1982	Trevor Hebberd	Southampton	£80,000
January 1984	Peter Rhoades-Brown	Chelsea	£85,000
August 1984	Billy Hamilton	Burnley	£95,000
February 1985	Jeremy Charles	QPR	£100,000
July 1985	Neil Slatter	Bristol Rovers	£100,000
September 1985	Ray Houghton	Fulham	£147,000
December 1985	Dave Leworthy	Tottenham Hotspur	£200,000
September 1987	David Bardsley	Watford	£265,000
February 1988	Colin Greenall	Gillingham	£285,000
July 1998	Dean Windass	Aberdeen	£470,000

==== Record transfer fees received ====
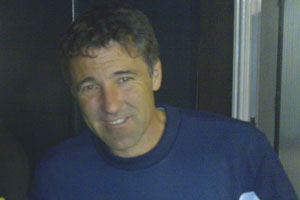
Dean Saunders was Oxford United's first million-pound sale.

#	Player	From	Fee^{[E]}	Date	Notes
1	Kemar Roofe	Leeds United	£3,000,000	July 2016	
2	Marvin Johnson	Middlesbrough	£2,500,000	August 2017	^{[C]}
3	Shandon Baptiste	Brentford	£2,250,000	January 2020	^{[C]}
4	Gavin Whyte	Cardiff City	£2,000,000	July 2019	^{[C]}
5	Rob Dickie	QPR	£1,800,000	September 2020	^{[C]}
6	Matt Elliott	Leicester City	£1,600,000	January 1997	
7	Joey Beauchamp	West Ham United	£1,000,000	June 1994	
8	Dean Saunders	Derby County	£1,000,000	October 1988	
9	Dean Windass	Bradford City	£1,000,000	March 1999	
10	Callum O'Dowda	Bristol City	£1,000,000	July 2016	

==== Progressive transfer fee received ====
Progressive transfer fee shows the chronological order in which the record transfer fee was set, and the transfer that set it.

Date	Player	Bought from	Fee
January 1951	Cliff Nugent	Cardiff City	£2,500
October 1963	Bud Houghton	Lincoln City	£6,000
February 1968	George Kerr	Scunthorpe United	£7,000
October 1968	Mick Bullock	Leyton Orient	£10,000
June 1970	Jim Barron	Nottingham Forest	£35,000
February 1974	John Evanson	Blackpool	£40,000
February 1975	Dave Roberts	Hull City	£70,000
November 1980	Les Taylor	Watford	£100,000
March 1982	Keith Cassells	Southampton	£115,000
March 1982	Mark Wright	Southampton	£115,000
January 1987	John Aldridge	Liverpool	£775,000
October 1987	Ray Houghton	Liverpool	£825,000
October 1988	Dean Saunders	Derby County	£1,000,000
January 1997	Matt Elliott	Leicester City	£1,600,000
July 2016	Kemar Roofe	Leeds United	£3,000,000

== Managerial records ==
- First professional manager: Harry Thompson (appointed in 1949)
- Longest serving manager: Arthur Turner, managed the club from 1959 until 1969
- Most spells as manager: 3, Darren Patterson and Jim Smith (each including one spell as caretaker manager)

== Club records ==
=== Goals ===
- Most Football League goals scored in a season: 91 in 46 matches, Division Three (level 3), 1983–84.
- Fewest Football League goals scored in a season: 34 in 42 matches, Division Two (level 2), 1968–69.
- Most Football League goals conceded in a season: 100 in 46 matches, Division Two (level 3), 2000–01.
- Fewest Football League goals conceded in a season: 36 in 42 matches, Division Two (level 2), 1984–85.
- Most league goals scored in a season at any level: 118 in 42 matches, Southern Football League. 1961–62.

=== Points ===
- Most points in a Football League season:
  - Two points for a win: 61 in 46 games, Division Four (level 4), 1964–65.
  - Three points for a win: 95 in 46 games,^{a} Division Three (level 3), 1983–84.
- Fewest points in a Football League season:
  - Two points for a win: 33 in 42 games, Division Two (level 2), 1975–76.
  - Three points for a win: 27 in 46 games,^{b} Division Two (level 3), 2000–01.

a. Also the most points won in a season at any level.
b. Also the fewest points won in a season at any level.

=== Matches ===
==== Firsts ====
- First match: Headington 1–2 Cowley Barracks, friendly, 25 November 1893.
- First FA Cup match: Headington United 2–8 Hounslow, extra preliminary qualifying round, 5 September 1931.
- First Spartan League match: Marlow 1–2 Headington United, 30 August 1947.
- First Southern League match: Hastings United 2–5 Headington United, 20 August 1949.
- First Football League match: Barrow 3–2 Oxford United, Division Four (level 4), 18 August 1962.
- First Football League Cup match: Torquay United 2–0 Oxford United, first round, 1 September 1962.

==== Record wins ====
- Record Football League home win: 7–0 against Barrow in Division Four (level 4), 19 December 1964.
- Record Football League away win: 6–0, against Lincoln City in League One (level 3), 21 September 2019, and against Crewe Alexandra, also in League One, 10 April 2021.
- Record FA Cup win: 9–1 against Dorchester Town, first round, 11 November 1995.
- Record League Cup win: 6–0 against Gillingham, second round first leg, 24 September 1986.
- Record win in any match: 9–0 against Wisbech Town in the Southern League, 10 December 1960.

==== Record defeat ====
- Record Football League defeat: 0–7 against Sunderland in Division One (level 2), 19 September 1998, and against Wigan Athletic in League One (level 3), 23 December 2017.
- Record League Cup defeat: 0–5 against Nottingham Forest, third round, 4 October 1978.

==== Sequences ====
- Successive wins in all competitions: 9, 2020–21 Season
- Successive wins in the Football League: 7, League One (level 3), 2020–21 Season
- Successive games unbeaten in all competitions: 19, 2006–07 Season
- Successive games unbeaten in the Football League: 15, 1990–91 Season

=== Attendances ===
- Largest home attendance
  - Manor Ground: 22,750 against Preston North End, FA Cup quarter-final, 29 February 1964.
  - Kassam Stadium: 12,243 against Leyton Orient, Football League Two (level 4), 6 May 2006.
- Highest home Football League attendance: 18,740 against Birmingham City, Division Two (level 2), 31 March 1972.
- Highest attendance played in front of anywhere: 90,396 against Queen's Park Rangers at Wembley Stadium, League Cup final, 20 April 1986.

== Footnotes ==
A. In this instance a major trophy refers to either the First Division/Premier League, the FA Cup or the League Cup.

B. Unless otherwise stated, Statistics taken from Brodetsky. Oxford United: The Complete Record, p. 365

C. Figures were undisclosed, but are believed to have been in the region of the amount stated.

D. Maurice Kyle was previously on loan from Wolves.

E. Unless otherwise stated, Statistics taken from Brodetsky. Oxford United: The Complete Record, p. 366
