= List of Oxford United F.C. seasons =

Oxford United Football Club is an English association football club originally formed in 1893 under the name Headington United. The club played in local Oxfordshire leagues until being elected into the Southern League in 1949. It was at this time the club turned professional. The club adopted its present name in 1960 and was elected into the Football League in 1962, replacing Accrington Stanley. Promotion to the Third Division followed in 1965, and the club were promoted again 3 years later and enjoyed an eight-year spell in the Football League Second Division, before being relegated. "The U's" reached the top tier of English football in 1985 after successive promotions, where they stayed for 3 years. During this time United won their only piece of major silverware, the 1986 Football League Cup.

Apart from relegation to the redesignated Second Division (the old Third Division after the creation of the Premier League) and subsequent promotion shortly afterwards, Oxford United remained in the second tier for eleven years until 1999. After this a decline set in, with two relegations in three years to the Football League Third Division, the fourth tier of English football. In 2006 Oxford became the first club to have reached the First Division and won a major trophy to be relegated from the Football League. One of the teams to be promoted were Conference champions Accrington Stanley, 44 years after Accrington lost their league status to Oxford. United gained promotion back to the Football League after beating York City 3–1 in the 2010 Conference Premier play-off final. After six seasons in League Two they finished 2nd in the table and were promoted to League One, the third tier of the English football pyramid.

== Seasons ==
Season	League									FA Cup	League Cup^{[A]}	Other		Top scorer(s)^{[B]}^{[C]}		Notes
Season	Division	P	W	D	L	F	A	Pts	Pos	FA Cup	League Cup^{[A]}	Other		Top scorer(s)^{[B]}^{[C]}		Notes
1893–94	Only friendlies were played															
1894–95	OCJ	Abandoned because of weather postponements														
1895–96	OCJ	12	4	1	7	18	27	9	^{[AC]}							
1896–97	OCJ	1	0	0	1	2	5	2	^{[AA]}							
1897–98	OCJ^{[AB]}	7	6	1	0	25	2	13	1st^{[AE]}							
1898–99	OCJ^{[AD]}	7	5	1	1	21	8	11	1st^{[AE]}					H. Knowles	8	
1899–1900	ODL^{[AF]}	9	3	2	4	19	13	8	3rd					H. Knowles	4	
1900–01	CJL^{[AG]}^{[AH]}	10	3	1	6	17	15	5^{[AI]}	4th			OSC	R1	S. Wakelin	4	
1901–02	ODL	8	4	2	2	18	6	10	3rd			OSC	F	C. Clinkard	4	
1902–03	ODL	1	1	0	0	6	0	2	^{[AJ]}					Six players	1	
1903–04	ODL	6	5	0	1	18	7	15	2nd					P. Tolley	5	
1904–05	Did not play senior league football this season															
1931–32	Oxon	22	16	0	6	72	33	48	4th	Expre		OSC	R1			
1932–33	Oxon	20	10	1	9	53	38	31	6th	Prelim		OSC	SF			
1933–34	Oxon	22	10	2	10	62	63	32	8th			OSC	R1			
1934–35	Oxon	22	8	2	12	49	49	26	7th	Expre		OSC	R2			
1935–36	Oxon	20	15	0	5	62	38	50	2nd	Expre		OSC	W			
1936–37	Oxon	24	16	2	6	94	50	50	3rd	Expre		OSC	SF			
1937–38	Oxon	26	19	3	4	83	38	60	2nd	Prelim		OSC	SF			
1938–39	Oxon	26	24	2	0	125	21	74	1st	QR1		OSC	F			
1939–40	Oxon	21	11	3	7	57	36	36	4th	^{[D]}		OSC	SF			
1940–41	Oxon	25	12	5	8	79	41	41	n/a							
1941–42	Oxon	18	11	3	4	69	41	36	3rd			OSC	F			
1942–43	Oxon	n/a^{[E]}										OSC	R2			
1943–44	Oxon	12	3	3	6	26	36	12	5th			OSC	R1			
1944–45	Oxon	18	10	2	6	46	29	32	4th			OSC	R2			
1945–46	Oxon	12	9	2	1	55	22	29	2nd	QR2		OSC	F			
1946–47	Oxon	Abandoned because of weather postponements								QR2		OSC	R2			
1947–48	SP1W^{[G]}	24	14	5	5	78	37	47	5th	Prelim		OSC	W			
1948–49	SP1W	26	16	1	9	87	48	49	4th	Prelim		OSC	SF			
1949–50	SL^{[H]}	46	15	7	24	72	97	37	21st	QR1		SLC	R1	Jim Smith	15	
1950–51	SL	44	18	11	15	84	83	47	7th	QR1		SLC	R1	Bill Rowstron	24	
1951–52	SL	42	16	11	15	55	53	43	11th	QR3^{[I]}		SLC	R1	Vic Barney	13	
1952–53	SL	42	23	12	7	93	50	58	1st	QR4		SLC	W	Norman Mills	22	
1953–54	SL	42	22	9	11	68	43	53	2nd	R4		SLC	W	Ken Smith	17	
1954–55	SL	42	18	7	17	82	62	43	10th	R1		SLC	R1	Harry Yates	25	
1955–56	SL	42	17	6	19	82	86	40	15th	QR4		SLC	QR2	Jimmy Smillie	25	
1956–57	SL	42	19	7	16	64	61	45	9th	QR4		SLC	R2	Lionel Phillips	13	
1957–58	SL	42	18	7	17	90	83	43	9th	QR4		SLC	QR1	Jack Cross	23	
1958–59	SL	34	16	3	15	76	61	35	10th	R2		SLC	R1	Joe Dickson	27	
1959–60	SLP	42	23	8	11	78	61	54	2nd	R1		SLC	R2	Geoff Denial	24	
1960–61	SLP	42	27	10	5	104	43	64	1st^{[I]}	R3		SLC	R2	Tony Jones	38	
1961–62	SLP	42	28	5	9	118	46	61	1st	R1		SLC	QR2	Bud Houghton	43	
1962–63	Div 4^{[K]}	46	13	15	18	70	71	41	18th	R3	R1			Bud Houghton	18	
1963–64	Div 4	46	14	13	19	59	63	41	18th	R6	R1			Arthur Longbottom	14	
1964–65	Div 4	46	23	15	8	87	44	61	4th	R1	R2			Colin Booth	23	
1965–66	Div 3	46	19	8	19	70	74	46	14th	R1	R1			Graham Atkinson	19	
1966–67	Div 3	46	15	13	18	61	66	43	16th	R2	R1			Graham Atkinson	15	
1967–68	Div 3	46	22	13	11	69	47	57	1st	R1	R3			Mick Bullock	16	
1968–69	Div 2	42	12	9	21	34	55	33	20th	R3	R1			John Shuker	8	
1969–70	Div 2	42	12	15	15	35	42	39	15th	R3	R5			Ken Skeen	13	
1970–71	Div 2	42	14	14	14	41	48	42	14th	R5	R3			Ken Skeen	9	
1971–72	Div 2	42	12	14	16	43	55	38	15th	R3	R3			Nigel Cassidy	13	
1972–73	Div 2	42	19	7	16	52	43	45	8th	R4	R2	AIC	Grp	Hugh Curran	17	
1973–74	Div 2	42	10	16	16	35	46	36	18th	R3	R2			Hugh Curran	14	
1974–75	Div 2	42	15	12	15	41	51	42	11th	R3	R1			Derek Clarke	9	
1975–76	Div 2	42	11	11	20	39	59	33	20th	R3	R2			Mick Tait	12	
1976–77	Div 3	46	12	15	19	55	65	39	17th	R1	R1			Peter Foley	13	
1977–78	Div 3	46	13	14	19	64	67	40	18th	R1	R2			Peter Foley	21	
1978–79	Div 3	46	14	18	14	44	50	46	11th	R1	R3			Jason Seacole	11	
1979–80	Div 3	46	14	13	19	57	62	41	17th	R1	R3			Paul Berry	14	
1980–81	Div 3	46	13	17	16	39	47	43	14th	R2	R3			Malcolm Shotton	7	
1981–82	Div 3	46	19	14	13	63	49	71	5th	R5	R3	FLGC	Grp	Keith Cassells	22	
1982–83	Div 3	46	22	12	12	71	53	78^{[L]}	5th	R3	R2	FLT^{[M]}	Grp	Mick Vinter	14	
1983–84	Div 3	46	28	11	7	91	50	95	1st	R5	R5	AMC	R1	Steve Biggins	24	
1984–85	Div 2	42	25	9	8	84	36	84	1st	R4	R4			John Aldridge	34	
1985–86	Div 1	42	10	12	20	62	80	42	18th	R3	W	FMC	F^{[N]}	John Aldridge	31	
1986–87	Div 1	42	11	13	18	44	69	46	18th	R3	R4	FMC	R3	John Aldridge	21	
1987–88	Div 1	40	6	13	21	44	80	31	21st	R4	SF	FMC	R2	Dean Saunders	21	
1988–89	Div 2	46	14	12	20	62	70	54	17th	R4	R2	FMC	R1	Martin Foyle	15	
1989–90	Div 2	46	15	9	22	57	66	54	17th	R4	R1	FMC	R1	John Durnin	15	
1990–91	Div 2	46	14	19	13	69	66	61	10th	R4	R4	FMC	R3	Paul Simpson	18	
1991–92	Div 2	46	13	11	22	66	73	50	21st	R4	R2	FMC	R1	Jim Magilton	13	
1992–93	Div 1^{[O]}	46	14	14	18	53	56	56	14th	R3	R2	AIC	Grp	Jim Magilton	13	
1993–94	Div 1	46	13	10	23	54	75	49	23rd	R5	R2	AIC	Grp	John Byrne	9	
1994–95	Div 2	46	21	12	13	66	52	73	7th	R1	R2	AMC	QF	Paul Moody	24	
1995–96	Div 2	46	24	11	11	76	39	83	2nd	R4	R2	AMC	R2	Paul Moody	24	
1996–97	Div 1	46	16	9	21	64	68	57	17th	R3	R4			Nigel Jemson	23	
1997–98	Div 1	46	16	10	20	60	64	58	12th	R3	R4			Joey Beauchamp	19	
1998–99	Div 1	46	10	14	22	48	71	44	23rd	R4	R1			Dean Windass	18	
1999–2000	Div 2	46	12	9	25	43	73	45	20th	R3	R3	AMC	QF	Matt Murphy	17	
1999–2000	Div 2	46	12	9	25	43	73	45	20th	R3	R3	FLT	R3	Matt Murphy	17	
2000–01	Div 2	46	7	6	33	53	100	27	24th	R2	R1	FLT	R1	Phil Gray	9	
2001–02	Div 3	46	11	14	21	53	62	47	21st	R1	R1	FLT	R1	Paul Moody	13	
2002–03	Div 3	46	19	12	15	57	47	69	8th	R3	R3	FLT	R1	Andy Scott	11	
2003–04	Div 3	46	18	17	11	55	44	71	9th	R1	R2	FLT	R1	Steve Basham	15	
2004–05	Lge 2^{[P]}	46	16	11	19	50	63	59	15th	R1	R1	FLT	R1	Tommy Mooney	15	
2005–06	Lge 2	46	11	16	19	43	57	49	23rd	R2	R1	FLT	AQF	Steve Basham	13	
2006–07	Conf Nat	46	22	15	9	66	33	81	2nd^{[Q]}	R1		FAT	R2	Robert Duffy	21	
2007–08	Conf Nat	46	20	11	15	56	48	71	9th	R2		FAT	R1	Yemi Odubade	11	
2007–08	Conf Nat	46	20	11	15	56	48	71	9th	R2		CLC	R4	Yemi Odubade	11	
2008–09	Conf Nat	46	24	10	12	72	51	77	7th	R2		FAT	R2	James Constable	26	
2008–09	Conf Nat	46	24	10	12	72	51	77	7th	R2		CLC	R3	James Constable	26	
2009–10	Conf Nat	44^{[AK]}	25	11	8	64	31	86	3rd^{[AL]}	R2		FAT	R4	James Constable	23	
2010–11	Lge 2	46	17	12	17	58	60	63	12th	R1	R2	FLT	R1	James Constable	17	
2011–12	Lge 2	46	17	17	12	59	48	68	9th	R1	R1	FLT	AQF	James Constable	11	
2012–13	Lge 2	46	19	8	19	60	61	65	9th	R3	R2	FLT	ASF	James Constable	14	
2013–14	Lge 2	46	16	14	16	53	50	62	8th	R3	R1	FLT	R2	James Constable	12	
2014–15	Lge 2	46	15	16	15	49	48	61	13th	R2	R2	FLT	R1	Danny Hylton	16	
2015–16	Lge 2	46	24	14	8	84	41	86	2nd	R4	R2	FLT	Final	Kemar Roofe	26	
2016–17	Lge 1	46	20	9	17	65	52	69	8th	R5	R2	FLT	Final	Chris Maguire	17	
2017–18	Lge 1	46	15	11	20	61	66	56	16th	R1	R1	FLT	R4	James Henry, Wes Thomas	11	
2018–19	Lge 1	46	15	15	16	58	64	60	12th	R3	R3	FLT	R4	James Henry	15	
2019–20	Lge 1	35	17	9	9	61	37	60	4th^{[AM]}	R4	QF	FLT	R2	Matty Taylor	17	
2020–21	Lge 1	46	22	8	16	77	56	74	6th	R1	R2	FLT	SF	Matty Taylor	13	
2021–22	Lge 1	46	22	10	14	82	59	76	8th	R1	R2	FLT	GRP	Matty Taylor	22	
2022–23	Lge 1	46	11	14	21	49	56	47	19th	R3	R2	FLT	GRP	Cameron Brannagan	12	
2023–24	Lge 1	46	22	11	13	79	56	77	5th^{[AN]}	R3	R1	FLT	R2	Mark Harris	19	
2024–25	Champ	46	13	14	19	49	65	53	17th	R3	R2			Mark Harris, Greg Leigh	6	
2025–26	Champ	46	11	14	21	45	59	47	22nd	R4	R2			Will Lankshear	12	

== Key ==
Division shown in bold when it changes because of promotion, relegation or league reorganisation. Top scorer shown in bold when he set or equalled a club record.

Key to league record:

- P = Played
- W = Games won
- D = Games drawn
- L = Games lost
- F = Goals for
- A = Goals against
- Pts = Points
- Pos = Final position

Key to divisions:

- Champ = EFL Championship
- Div 1 = Football League First Division
- Div 2 = Football League Second Division
- Div 3 = Football League Third Division
- Div 4 = Football League Fourth Division
- Lge 2 = Football League Two
- Conf Nat = Conference National
- OCJ = Oxfordshire City Junior A Division
- ODL = Oxfordshire District League
- OSC = Oxfordshire Senior Cup
- Oxon = Oxfordshire Senior Football League
- SLP = Southern Football League Premier
- SP1W = Spartan League Division 1 (Western)
- AIC = Anglo-Italian Cup
- AMC = Associate Members Cup
- CLC = Conference League Cup
- FAT = FA Trophy
- FLGC = Football League Group Cup
- FLT = Football League Trophy
- FMC = Full Members Cup
- SLC = Southern League Cup

Key to rounds:

- Expre = Extra Preliminary round
- Prelim = Preliminary round
- Q1 = Qualifying Round 1
- Q2 = Qualifying Round 2
- Q3 = Qualifying Round 3
- Q4 = Qualifying Round 4
- R1 = Round 1
- R2 = Round 2
- R3 = Round 3
- R4 = Round 4
- R5 = Round 5
- R6 = Round 6
- Grp = Group stage
- AQF = Area Quarter-finals
- QF = Quarter-finals
- ASF = Area Semi-finals
- SF = Semi-finals
- F = Southern Final
- Final = Runners-Up
- W = Winners

Champions	Runners-up	Promoted	Relegated

== Notes ==
A. The Football League Cup competition did not start until the 1960–61 season.
B. There are no complete records of scorers until 1898
C. Includes goals scored in the Oxon League, City Junior League, Oxfordshire District League, the Football League (including play-offs), FA Cup, Anglo-Italian Cup, Football League Cup, Associate Members' Cup/Football League Trophy, Conference National (including playoffs), FA Trophy and Conference League Cup.
D. The FA Cup was not held until 1945 because of World War 2.
E. The league records are incomplete.
G. Headington left the Oxfordshire Senior League and moved into the Spartan League.
H. Headington United were elected into the Southern League.
I. Headington United were disqualified following an appeal from Wycombe Wanderers.
J. Despite finishing as champions, Oxford United failed to be elected into the Football League.
K. Oxford United were elected into the football league, replacing the original Accrington Stanley.
L. From the 1981–82 season, points were allocated on the basis of 3 for a win and 1 for a draw; previously only two points had been given for a win.
M. The Football League Group Cup was renamed Football League Trophy for the 1982–83 season. The current tournament of the same name was originally the Associate Members Cup.
N. Oxford United reached the Southern Final round, but failed to reach the overall final.
O. Division Two re-designated Division One on formation of the F.A. Premier League.
P. Football League Division Three renamed "League Two" because of a sponsorship change.
Q. After qualifying for the play-offs, Oxford United lost on penalties in the semi-finals against Exeter City.
AA. Only one match was played before the competition was scrapped and replaced with a Junior Cup.
AB. A match against St Paul's was a walkover.
AC. No table was kept as a way of ordering the teams.
AD. A match against Cowley Juniors was a walkover.
AE. Oxford United went on to the league final, winning it in consecutive seasons.
AF. Oxford's application to join the second division of the Oxfordshire District League was accepted.
AG. Because of the Boer War, Oxford were forced to withdraw from the Oxfordshire District League as 10 members of the team were on active duty. However, the following season they returned to the league.
AH. A match against College Servants was a walkover.
AI. Oxford were deducted 2 points for fielding an illegible player.
AJ. After crowd trouble during a game against Victoria, Oxford were banned from playing matches within three miles of their ground, and such could not fulfill their league fixtures.
AK. Only 44 games were played because of the expulsion of Chester City halfway through the season.
AL. Oxford were promoted through the play-offs, beating York City 3–1 at Wembley Stadium.
AM. The League one season was suspended on 3 March 2020 because of the COVID-19 pandemic, with clubs voting to curtail the season three months later. Positions were decided based on points per game (PPG).
AN. Oxford were promoted through the play-offs, beating Bolton Wanderers 2–0 at Wembley Stadium.
