= Shuker =

Shuker is a surname. Notable people with the surname include:

- Abraham Shuker (1848–1909), cricketer
- Chris Shuker (born 1982), football coach and former football midfielder
- Gavin Shuker (born 1981), politician
- John Shuker (1942–2019), professional footballer
- Karl Shuker (born 1959), zoologist, cryptozoologist and author
- Lucy Shuker (born 1980), wheelchair tennis player
