= Seacole (surname) =

Seacole is an English surname. Notable people with the surname include:

- Jason Seacole (born 1960), English footballer
- Mary Seacole (1805–1881), British-Jamaican nurse, healer, and businesswoman
