= Alan Willey =

Alan Willey may refer to:

- Alan Willey (actor) (1909–1961), Australian-born American leading man; later stage name Alan Marshal
- Alan Willey (footballer, born 1941) (1941–2017), English forward
- Alan Willey (footballer, born 1956), English striker and American leading soccer player

== See also ==
- Alan Wiley (born 1960), English football referee
