= McGrogan =

McGrogan is a surname of Irish origin. Notable people with the surname include:

- Felix McGrogan (1914 - 1989), Scottish football player
- Hugh McGrogan (1957 - 1988), Scottish football player
- Joe McGrogan (born 1955), Scottish football player
