= David Sloan =

David Sloan may refer to:

- David Sloan (American football) (born 1972), former American football tight end
- David Sloan (footballer) (1941–2016), Northern Irish professional footballer
- David Sloan (politician), former MLA of Whitehorse West, Yukon

== See also ==
- David Sloan Wilson
