= Colin Harrington =

English footballer

Personal information
- Date of birth: 3 April 1943 (age 83)
- Place of birth: Bicester, England
- Position: Midfielder

Senior career*
Years	Team	Apps	(Gls)
–1962	Wolverhampton Wanderers	0	(0)
1962–1971	Oxford United	234	(29)
1971–1972	Mansfield Town	13	(0)
1972–?	Kettering Town	81	(12)
- * Club domestic league appearances and goals

Colin Harrington (born 3 April 1943) is an English former footballer who played for Oxford United, Wolverhampton Wanderers, Mansfield Town and Kettering Town. During his spell at Oxford, he played 234 league games. After leaving Oxford United, Harrington moved to Mansfield Town where he was signed to Kettering Town by Ron Atkinson.
