= Norman Aldridge =

English footballer

Personal information
- Date of birth: 21 February 1921
- Place of birth: Coventry, England
- Date of death: 14 January 2007 (aged 85)
- Place of death: Nuneaton, Warwickshire, England
- Position: Defender

Senior career*
Years	Team	Apps	(Gls)
- Foxford
1946–1947	West Bromwich Albion	1	(0)
1947–1948	Northampton Town	2	(0)
- Headington United
- * Club domestic league appearances and goals

Norman Aldridge (23 February 1921 – 14 January 2007) was an English footballer who played in the Football League for West Bromwich Albion and Northampton Town as a full-back.
