= Bert Kay =

Australian rules footballer

Personal information
- Full name: Albert Ezra Kay
- Born: 14 May 1877; Creswick, Victoria
- Died: 23 October 1960 (aged 83); Cheltenham, Victoria
- Original team: Caulfield Collegians

Playing career^{1}
Years	Club	Games (Goals)
1898	St Kilda	1 (0)
- ^{1} Playing statistics correct to the end of 1898.

Albert Ezra Kay (14 May 1877 – 23 October 1960) was an Australian rules footballer who played for the St Kilda Football Club in the Victorian Football League (VFL).
