= Dick Lucas (footballer) =

English footballer

Personal information
- Full name: Richard John Lucas
- Date of birth: 22 January 1948 (age 78)
- Place of birth: Witney, Oxfordshire, England
- Position: Defender

Youth career
- 1963–1965: Oxford United

Senior career*
Years	Team	Apps	(Gls)
1965–1975	Oxford United	191	(2)
1975–1978	Kettering Town	23	(1)
1978–1979	Aylesbury United	33	(0)
- * Club domestic league appearances and goals

Richard John Lucas (born 22 January 1948) is an English retired professional footballer who played for Oxford United, Kettering Town and Aylesbury United.

== Playing career ==
Born in Witney in 1948, Dick played his first game for Oxford United 'A' in January 1963, before signing his first professional contract in 1965. Dick played in 8 seasons for United, making a total of 219 appearances in all competitions, including 4 goals. A long term ankle injury ended his Football League career, with a move to Kettering Town following. Dick finished his playing career with a short spell at Aylesbury United, between 1978 and 1979.

== Retirement ==
After finishing his football career, Lucas founded the company Busby & Lucas, supplying, servicing and repairing white goods in Witney, Oxfordshire. He sold the business in February 2020.

== Career statistics ==
Club statistics
Club	Season	League			FA Cup		League Cup		Other		Total	
Club	Season	Division	Apps	Goals	Apps	Goals	Apps	Goals	Apps	Goals	Apps	Goals
Oxford United	1967–68	Third Division	2	0	0	0	0	0	0	0	2	0
Oxford United	1968–69	Second Division	9	0	0	0	0	0	0	0	9	0
Oxford United	1969–1970	Second Division	41	0	2	0	6	0	0	0	49	0
Oxford United	1970–71	Second Division	42	1	5	1	2	1	0	0	49	3
Oxford United	1971–72	Second Division	33	1	0	0	2	0	0	0	35	1
Oxford United	1972–73	Second Division	40	0	2	0	3	0	4 (Note: Played in the Anglo-Italian Cup)	0	49	0
Oxford United	1973–74	Second Division	19	0	1	0	0	0	0	0	20	1
Oxford United	1974–75	Second Division	5	0	0	0	1	0	0	0	6	0
Oxford United	Sub-Total		191	2	10	1	14	1	4	0	219	4
Kettering Town	1975–78	Southern League	23	1	0	0	0	0	0	0	23	1
Kettering Town	Sub-Total		23	1	0	0	0	0	0	0	23	1
Aylesbury United	1978–79	Southern League	29	0	3	0	0	0	8 (Note: Played in the FA Trophy, Southern League Cup and the Berks & Bucks Senior Cup)	0	40	0
Aylesbury United	1979–1980	Southern League	4	0	0	0	0	0	5	0	9	0
Aylesbury United	Sub-Total		33	0	3	0	0	0	13	0	49	0
Career total			247	3	13	1	14	1	17	0	291	5

== Honours ==
Oxford United

- Football League
  - Third Division: Champions 1967–68
