= Tim Smithers =

English footballer (born 1956)

Personal information
- Full name: Timothy Smithers
- Date of birth: 22 January 1956 (age 70)
- Place of birth: Ramsgate, England
- Position: Left back

Senior career*
Years	Team	Apps	(Gls)
1976–1980	Nuneaton Borough	?	(?)
1980–1983	Oxford United	99	(6)
1983–1987	Nuneaton Borough	126	(30)
1987–1990	Atherstone United	?	(?)
1991–1993	Bedworth United	?	(?)
1994–1995	VS Rugby	17	(0)

International career
1986	England C	1	(0)

Managerial career
- 1993: Bedworth United (caretaker manager)
- * Club domestic league appearances and goals

Timothy Smithers (born 22 January 1956 in Ramsgate) is an English former professional footballer who played in the Football League, as a left back.

== Club career ==
=== Early career ===
Before transitioning to professional football, Smithers worked with British Aerospace in Lutterworth for eight years as an aircraft fitter.

In 1976, he was signed by Nuneaton Borough from Coventry Sphinx's junior team. He debuted for Nuneaton Borough on April 6, 1976, against Margate, and scored two goals. The following season, he participated in the 1977–78 FA Cup, where Nuneaton defeated Football League side Oxford United in the first round. He also scored the winning goal in the 1978 Birmingham Senior Cup, where the club defeated Redditch United. Smithers would win his second Birmingham Senior Cup when Nuneaton defeated Lye Town in 1980. Following the club's success in the Birmingham Senior Cup, they secured additional silverware by winning the 1980 Midland Floodlit Cup against AP Leamington.

=== Oxford United ===
In February 1980, Smithers was linked with a possible move to Oxford United. He officially signed with Oxford in May 1980, along with Malcolm Shotton, for a reported transfer fee of £15,000. In his debut season in the Football League Third Division, he scored the lone goal against Millwall on August 30, 1981, which prevented the club from relegation.

Injuries and irregular playing time marked his first season with Oxford, and he would become a starter the following season. In the following season, as he became a starter, the club would also become promotion contenders. In his final season with Oxford, he was linked with a potential move back to Nuneaton Borough. Nuneaton Borough received Oxford's permission to negotiate with Smithers but failed to finalize a deal.

=== Nuneaton Town ===
In his final season with Oxford, he was relegated to the reserve side, which enabled Nuneaton Borough to pursue him. A month later, his contract with Oxford was mutually terminated, and he returned to his former club. Smithers helped the club finish as runners-up in the Alliance Premier League. The following season, he helped Nuneaton avoid relegation.

=== Atherstone United ===
In 1987, Smithers was loaned to Atherstone Town for a month to play in the Southern Football League . Following his months' trial with Atherstone, he signed permanently with the club on January 2, 1988. He re-signed with Atherstone for the 1988-1989 season. In his third season with the club, he was named the team's supporters player of the year and finished as the team's top goalscorer.

=== Bedworth United ===
After three years with Atherstone, he signed for Bedworth United in 1990. He was re-signed by the club the following season and was selected as the player-assistant coach and team captain. Throughout the 1991-1992 season, he managed a couple of matches as team manager while Brendon Phillips was on vacation. Once the season concluded, he was named the club's player of the year and the supporters' player of the year. Smithers was re-signed for the following campaign once more as the player-assistant coach. After the season concluded, he announced his retirement and declined to continue as the caretaker manager for Bedworth.

=== VS Rugby ===
Despite announcing his retirement, he resumed his career by signing with division rivals VS Rugby. Smithers re-signed with the club for the following season.

== International career ==
In 1985, he was selected by Kevin Verity to represent the England national football C team in the Four Nations Tournament.

== Managerial career ==
In 1985, while playing for Nuneaton Borough, Smithers served as an assistant coach to Richard Dixey. After the departure of Brendon Phillips, he was named the caretaker manager for Bedworth United in April 1993. He led Bedworth to secure the Midland Floodlit Cup by defeating Moor Green.

In 1995, Stewart Robson, the manager for VS Rugby, appointed Smithers as one of his coaches. However, he was released from his position a month later.

== Personal life ==
In 1978, Smithers married Carole Ledbrooke at St. James Church in Whitley, Coventry.

== Honors ==
=== Player ===
Nuneaton Borough

- Birmingham Senior Cup: 1978, 1980
- Midland Floodlit Cup: 1980

=== Manager ===
Bedworth United

- Midland Floodlit Cup: 1993
