= Maurice Kyle =

English footballer (1937–1981)

Personal information
- Date of birth: 8 November 1937
- Place of birth: Darlington, England
- Date of death: 16 January 1981 (aged 43)
- Place of death: Oxford, England
- Position: Defender

Youth career
- 1958–1959: Wolverhampton Wanderers

Senior career*
Years	Team	Apps	(Gls)
1959–1969	Oxford United	275	(2)
1969–1970	Southend United	8	(0)
- Worcester City
- Bath City
- * Club domestic league appearances and goals

Maurice Kyle (8 November 1937 – 16 January 1981) was an English footballer who played for Oxford United, Southend United, Worcester City and Bath City.

== Career ==
During his spell at Oxford, he played 275 league games, and he is seventh highest in the overall list of appearances. Although joining Oxford United in 1959, his transfer didn't officially go through until 1962 when the team joined The Football League.
