= AJ George =

Antiguan association football player

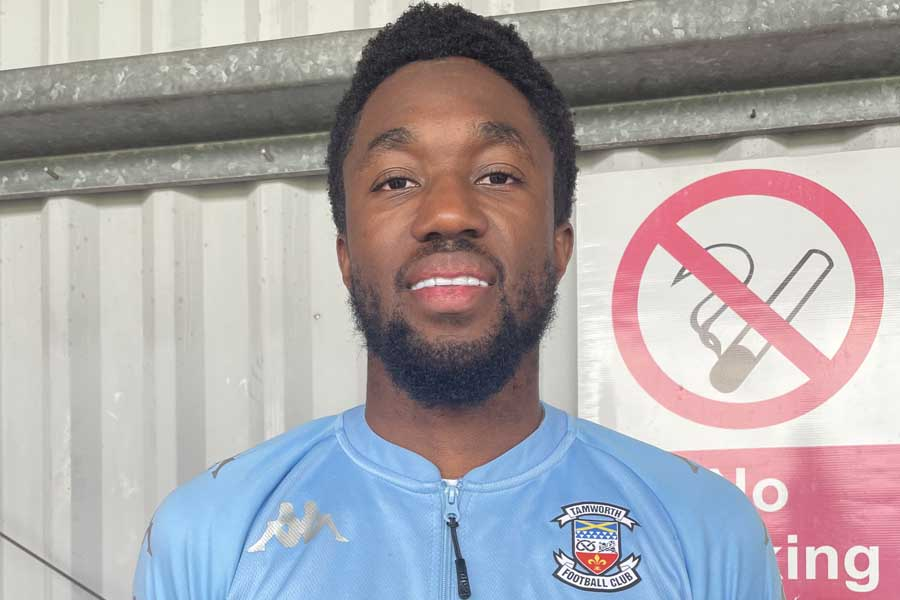
- George with Tamworth in September 2022

Personal information
- Full name: Adriel Jared George
- Date of birth: 6 December 1996 (age 29)
- Place of birth: St. Johns, Antigua
- Height: 1.79 m (5 ft 10 1/2 in)
- Position: Midfielder

Team information
- Current team: North Leigh

Youth career
- –2014: Oxford United

Senior career*
Years	Team	Apps	(Gls)
2014–2016	Oxford United	2	(0)
2014–2015	→ Banbury United (loan)	4	(0)
2016–2019	Mansfield Town	0	(0)
2017	→ Mickleover Sports (loan)		
2017	→ Hednesford Town (loan)		
2018	→ North Ferriby United (loan)	4	(0)
2019	Chippenham Town	11	(1)
2019–2021	Oxford City	8	(0)
2021	Slough Town	0	(0)
2021–2022	AFC Rushden & Diamonds	24	(0)
2022–2023	Tamworth	10	(0)
2023–	North Leigh	1	(0)

International career^{‡}
2014	Antigua and Barbuda U20		
2016–2018	Antigua and Barbuda	2	(1)
- * Club domestic league appearances and goals as of 18:03, 28 March 2023 (UTC) ‡ National team caps and goals as of 12:00, 26 June 2022 (UTC)

Adriel Jared George (born 6 December 1996) is an Antiguan footballer who plays for Combined Counties League Premier Division North side North Leigh and Antigua and Barbuda, where he plays as a midfielder.

== Club career ==
=== Oxford United ===
He made his Football League debut for Oxford United during their 1–0 defeat against Northampton Town in the 2015–16 season before being released by the club in May 2016.

=== Mansfield Town ===
He joined Mansfield Town in 2016, and played for the club's development teams. In February 2017 he joined Mickleover Sports on loan. In November 2017 he joined Hednesford Town on loan. In March 2018 he joined North Ferriby United on loan.

=== Chippenham Town ===
He signed for National League South side Chippenham Town in February 2019,

=== Oxford City ===
George moved to Oxford City on 16 December 2019.

=== Slough Town ===
George joined National League South side Slough Town on 24 September 2021, and was named as an unused substitute the following day in a National League South fixture away to Hungerford Town, with the match finishing 1-1.

=== AFC Rushden & Diamonds ===
AJ signed for Southern League Premier Division Central side AFC Rushden & Diamonds on 23 October 2021. George made his debut for AFC Rushden & Diamonds on 30 October 2021 in an FA Cup 3rd qualifying round fixture away to Matlock Town, with the home side winning the tie 2–1.

=== Tamworth ===
On 24 June 2022, AJ signed for Southern League Premier Division Central rivals Tamworth, and was reunited with his former AFC Rushden & Diamonds manager Andy Peaks.

=== North Leigh ===
In March 2023, George signed for North Leigh.

== International career ==
He made his international debut for Antigua and Barbuda in 2016 on 23 March in a Caribbean Cup Qualifying match against Aruba, where he also scored his first international goal.

=== International goals ===
Scores and results list Antigua and Barbuda's goal tally first.

Goal	Date	Venue	Opponent	Score	Result	Competition
1.	23 March 2016	Sir Vivian Richards Stadium, North Sound, Antigua and Barbuda	Aruba	2–1	2–1	2017 Caribbean Cup qualification

== Career statistics ==
=== Club ===
As of match played 23 April 2022

Club	Season	League			FA Cup		League Cup		Other		Total	
Club	Season	Division	Apps	Goals	Apps	Goals	Apps	Goals	Apps	Goals	Apps	Goals
Oxford United	2014–15	League Two	0	0	0	0	0	0	0	0	0	0
Banbury United (loan)	2014–15	Southern League Premier Division	4	0	0	0	—		0	0	4	0
Oxford United	2015–16	League Two	2	0	1	0	0	0	1 (Note: One appearance in EFL Trophy)	0	4	0
Mansfield Town	2016–17	League Two	0	0	0	0	0	0	0	0	0	0
Mickleover Sports (loan)	2016–17	Northern Premier League Premier Division	—		—		—		—		—	
Mansfield Town	2017–18	League Two	0	0	0	0	0	0	0	0	0	0
Hednesford Town (loan)	2017–18	Northern Premier League Premier Division	—		—		—		—		—	
North Ferriby United (loan)	2017–18	National League North	4	0	0	0	—		0	0	4	0
Mansfield Town	2018–19	League Two	0	0	0	0	0	0	0	0	0	0
Chippenham Town	2018–19	National League South	9	1	0	0	—		0	0	9	1
Chippenham Town	2019–20	National League South	2	0	1	0	—		0	0	3	0
Oxford City	2019–20	National League South	8	0	0	0	—		2 (Note: Two appearances in Oxfordshire Senior Cup)	0	10	0
Oxford City	2020–21	National League South	0	0	0	0	—		0	0	0	0
Oxford City	2021–22	National League South	0	0	0	0	—		0	0	0	0
Slough Town	2021–22	National League South	0	0	0	0	—		0	0	0	0
AFC Rushden & Diamonds	2021–22	Southern League Premier Division Central	24	0	0	0	—		4 (Note: One appearance in FA Trophy) (Note: Three appearances in Northamptonshire Senior Cup)	1 (Note: One goal in Northamptonshire Senior Cup)	28	1
Tamworth	2022–23	Southern League Premier Division Central	0	0	0	0	—		0	0	0	0
Career total			53	0	2	0	0	0	7	1	62	1
