= Paul Berry (footballer, born 1958) =

English footballer (1958–2026)

Personal information
- Date of birth: 8 April 1958
- Place of birth: Oxford, England
- Date of death: 11 April 2026 (aged 68)
- Positions: Midfielder; forward

Senior career*
| Years | Team | Apps | (Gls) |
| 1977–1982 | Oxford United | 108 | (20) |
| 1982–? | Witney United | | |

Managerial career
- Ardley United (joint)
- Bicester Town
- Carterton
- Abingdon Town
- * Club domestic league appearances and goals

Paul Berry (8 April 1958 – 11 April 2026) was an English professional footballer who played as a midfielder and forward for Oxford United and Witney United. He also had a brief spell at Norwich City before joining and playing full-time at Oxford.

After retiring from playing professional football he managed Ardley United, Carterton, Bicester Town and Abingdon Town. Berry died aged 68 on 11 April 2026.
