= Cyril Beavon =

English footballer

Personal information
- Date of birth: 27 September 1937
- Place of birth: Barnsley, England
- Date of death: 22 December 2017 (aged 80)
- Position: Defender

Senior career*
Years	Team	Apps	(Gls)
1956–1959	Wolverhampton Wanderers	0	(0)
1959–1969	Oxford United	461	(11)
1969–1972	Banbury United		
- * Club domestic league appearances and goals

Cyril Beavon (27 September 1937 – 22 December 2017) was an English footballer who played in the Football League for Oxford United.

== Career ==
Beavon joined Oxford United from Wolverhampton Wanderers in 1959, after failing to make an appearance for their first team. He spent a decade at the Manor Ground, helping the club to the Southern League championship in 1961–62, following which the club was elected to the Football League. Beavon played in every single game in that season.

Beavon left Oxford United for non-league Banbury United in 1969. Beavon was at Banbury United for three seasons before injury forced him to retire. Beavon did a number of jobs after football including a period as both a milkman and a postman.

== Personal life ==
Beavon was the father of former player Stuart Beavon Snr, and grandfather of Stuart Beavon Jnr. He died on 22 December 2017, aged 80.
