= Ray Gaston =

Northern Irish footballer

Personal information
- Date of birth: 22 December 1946 (age 79)
- Place of birth: Belfast, Northern Ireland
- Position: Forward

Senior career*
Years	Team	Apps	(Gls)
1964–1965	Coleraine	2	(1)
1965–1966	Wolverhampton Wanderers	0	(0)
1965–1968	Coleraine		
1968–1969	Oxford United	12	(2)
1969–1970	→ Lincoln City (loan)	4	(1)
1970	→ Coleraine (loan)		
1970–1972	Finn Harps	21	(13)
1972–1973	Coleraine		
1974–1975	Ballymena United		

International career
1968	Northern Ireland	1	(0)
1969	Northern Ireland U23	1	(0)
- * Club domestic league appearances and goals

Ray Gaston (born 22 December 1946) is a Northern Irish former footballer who played for Coleraine, Oxford United and Lincoln City. During his spell at Oxford, he played just 12 league games. Gaston also made one appearance for the Northern Ireland national side.

He made his Irish League debut for Coleraine F.C. in February 1965 scoring against Ards. Forming a potent partnership with Jimmy O'Neill (footballer born 1941) they helped win the Ulster Cup in 1968.

For Coleraine he scored 63 goals in 127 total appearances. He scored 14 goals in 26 total appearances for Harps. His son Paul also went on to play for Coleraine.

== Sources ==
- The Finn Harps Story by Bartley Ramsay (ISBN 0-9558-0890-1)
