= Roy Burton =

English footballer and property developer

Personal information
- Date of birth: 13 January 1951 (age 75)
- Place of birth: Wantage, England
- Height: 5 ft 9 in (1.75 m)
- Position: Goalkeeper

Senior career*
Years	Team	Apps	(Gls)
1971–1983	Oxford United	449	(0)
- Witney Town
- * Club domestic league appearances and goals

Roy Burton (born 13 March 1951 in Wantage, Berkshire) is an English former footballer and property developer.

He played as a goalkeeper, playing 449 games, in a thirteen and a half year spell for Oxford United, before moving on to Witney Town.
