= Hugh McGrogan =

Scottish footballer

Billy Jeffrey
Personal information
- Date of birth: 1 March 1957
- Place of birth: Dumbarton, Scotland
- Date of death: 1998 (aged 40–41)
- Position: Midfielder

Senior career*
Years	Team	Apps	(Gls)
1974–1980	Oxford United	126	(13)
1980–1981	Carlisle United	2	(0)
- * Club domestic league appearances and goals

Hugh McGrogan (1 March 1957 – 1998) was a Scottish former footballer who played for Oxford United and Carlisle United. During his spell at Oxford, he played 126 league games. McGrogan died in 1998.
