= Peter Rhoades-Brown =

English footballer

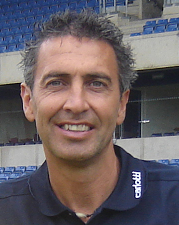
- Peter Rhoades-Brown at an Open Day in 2006

Personal information
- Date of birth: 2 January 1962 (age 64)
- Place of birth: Hampton, London, England
- Height: 5 ft 9 in (1.75 m)
- Position: Winger

Youth career
- Chelsea

Senior career*
Years	Team	Apps	(Gls)
1979–1984	Chelsea	96	(5)
1984–1989	Oxford United	112	(13)
1989–19??	Wycombe Wanderers		
19??–1997	Marlow		
1997–1998	Oxford City	19	(0)

Managerial career
- Marlow
- * Club domestic league appearances and goals

Peter Rhoades-Brown (born 2 January 1962) is an English retired footballer.

== Career ==
Rhoades-Brown played as a left-winger for Chelsea from 1979 to 1983; during his four years with Chelsea, he scored four League goals. When Chelsea signed winger Mickey Thomas in January 1984, Rhoades-Brown was sold to Third Division side Oxford United for £85,000.

He immediately gained a regular place with Oxford, helping them win promotion to the First Division for the first time. An untimely injury, coincidentally against Queen's Park Rangers (Oxford's Wembley opponents), prevented him from playing in the 1986 League Cup final, which the Yellows won 3–0 to claim their first major trophy.

Rhoades-Brown stayed with Oxford until 1989 when injury forced his retirement, his last game being at Bristol City on 11 October 1989. In total he played 87 League matches for Oxford (plus 25 substitute appearances), scoring 13 goals. In competitive games, he played 113 times (plus 29 as a substitute), scoring 16 goals.

Post-retirement, Rhoades-Brown returned to Oxford as Football in the Community Officer. He has also worked as a commentator for BBC Radio Oxford.

A testimonial match between an Oxford United XI and a Chelsea XI was held for him at the Kassam Stadium on 30 April 2007 in front of a crowd of 5,130. Among the players who appeared in the match were Rhoades-Brown's former Oxford teammates Ray Houghton, Joey Beauchamp and ex-England manager Steve McClaren.

In 2021, Rhoades-Brown received a special EFL Long Service Award from the English Football League.

== Honours ==
Oxford United

- Football League Third Division: 1983–84
