= Ken Skeen =

English footballer

Personal information
- Full name: Kenneth Albert Skeen
- Date of birth: 20 March 1942 (age 84)
- Place of birth: Cheltenham, England
- Position: Forward

Youth career
- Swindon Town

Senior career*
Years	Team	Apps	(Gls)
–1964	Trowbridge Town		
1964–1967	Swindon Town	14	(4)
1967–1974	Oxford United	270	(40)
1974	Cheltenham Town		
- * Club domestic league appearances and goals

Ken Skeen (born 20 March 1942) is an English former footballer who played for Oxford United, Cheltenham Town and Swindon Town. He made a total of 270 appearances for Oxford, scoring 40 goals.
