= Ron Atkinson =

Football player and manager (born 1939)

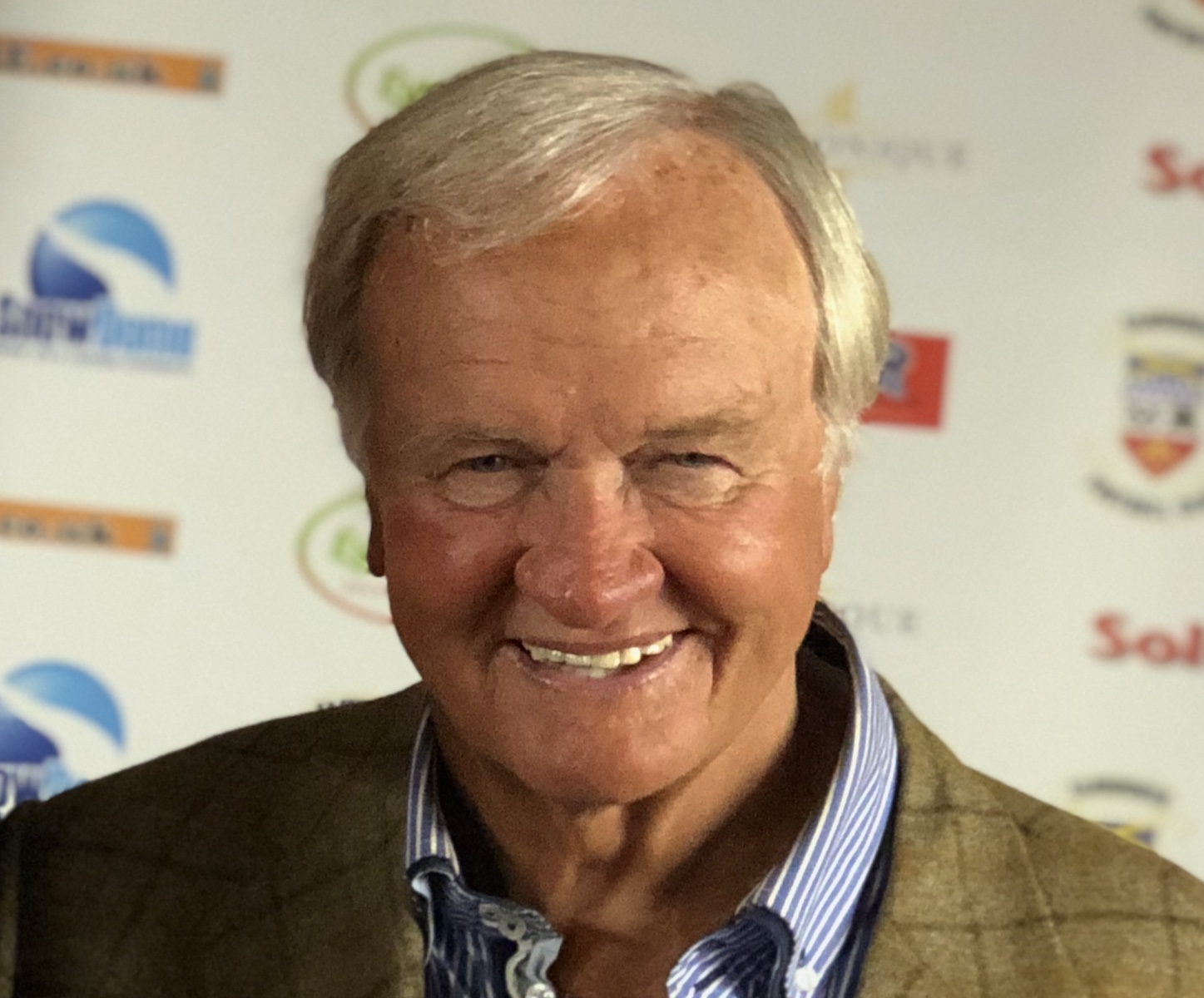
- Atkinson in 2019

Personal information
- Full name: Ronald Frederick Atkinson
- Date of birth: 18 March 1939 (age 87)
- Place of birth: Liverpool, England
- Position: Wing half

Youth career
- Wolverhampton Wanderers
- –1956: BSA Tools
- 1956–1959: Aston Villa

Senior career*
| Years | Team | Apps | (Gls) |
| 1959–1971 | Oxford United (Note: Changed name from Headington United to Oxford United in 1960) | 560 | (21) |

Managerial career
- 1971–1974: Kettering Town
- 1974–1978: Cambridge United
- 1978–1981: West Bromwich Albion
- 1981–1986: Manchester United
- 1987–1988: West Bromwich Albion
- 1988–1989: Atlético Madrid
- 1989–1991: Sheffield Wednesday
- 1991–1994: Aston Villa
- 1995–1996: Coventry City
- 1997–1998: Sheffield Wednesday
- 1999: Nottingham Forest
- * Club domestic league appearances and goals

Ronald Frederick Atkinson (born 18 March 1939) is an English former football player and manager. Nicknamed "Big Ron", he was regarded as one of Britain's best-known football pundits in the 1990s and early 2000s.

Nicknamed "The Tank" during his playing career, he represented Oxford United for twelve years, and still holds the club record for appearances. As a manager, he won the FA Cup with Manchester United in 1983 and 1985 and the Football League Cup with Sheffield Wednesday in 1991 and Aston Villa in 1994.

== Early life and playing career ==
Atkinson was born in Liverpool in the Old Swan area of the city as was his brother Graham Atkinson who was also a professional footballer. After a few years his family moved to Shard End (then in Warwickshire, now an area of Birmingham). He attended Lea Village Secondary School. After beginning his career as a ground staff boy at Wolverhampton Wanderers, he was signed by Aston Villa from works team BSA Tools at the age of 17. Atkinson has referred to then Villa coach Jimmy Hogan as his biggest influence. He never played a first-team match but team-mate Dennis Jackson noted "I played with Ron in about 100 reserve games. And according to Ron he was man of the match in at least 99 of them."

Atkinson was transferred to Headington United (renamed Oxford United in 1960) in the summer of 1959 on a free transfer. There he played alongside his younger brother Graham. He went on to make over 500 appearances in all competitions as a wing-half for the club, earning the nickname "The Tank" and scoring a total of fourteen goals. He was United's captain through their rise from the Southern League to the Second Division, achieved in only six years from 1962 to 1968. He was the first ever footballer to captain a club from the Southern League through three divisions of the Football League, and played three seasons in the Second Division.

== Managerial career ==
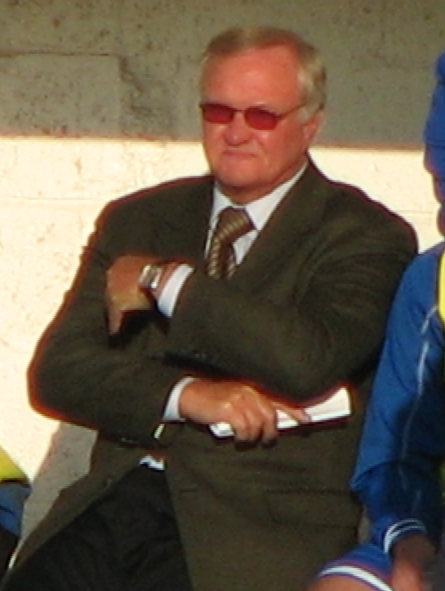
Atkinson in 2007.

=== Kettering Town and Cambridge United ===
After retiring from playing, Atkinson became manager player of non-league Kettering Town in 1971, aged only 32. His success there led to a move to the league with Cambridge United, in November 1974, going on to win the Fourth Division in 1977 and leaving them when they were on the verge of promotion to the Second Division, which they later achieved that season under Atkinson's assistant John Docherty.

=== West Bromwich Albion ===
In January 1978, Atkinson moved to manage First Division West Bromwich Albion. He soon signed Brendon Batson from his former club, to play alongside Laurie Cunningham and Cyrille Regis. Never before had a team in the top division of English football simultaneously fielded three black players on a regular basis.

Atkinson led West Bromwich Albion to third place in the league in the season 1978–79 and also to the UEFA Cup quarter-finals. On 30 December 1978, they achieved a famous 5–3 victory over Manchester United at Old Trafford. The club were second in the table at the time, only beaten off top spot from Liverpool by goal difference. They finished fourth in 1981, and shortly after this Atkinson was appointed the manager of Manchester United following the dismissal of Dave Sexton.

=== Manchester United ===
Atkinson was seen as the man who could bring the spark to Manchester United that had been so sorely lacking under his predecessor. Sexton had taken them to second place in the league in 1980 but did not win a major trophy in his four years at the club. United had finished eighth in the season before Atkinson's appointment, and Atkinson had actually missed out of the chance of overseeing a UEFA Cup campaign by departing from Albion and taking over at United.

In the 1981–82 season, United finished third in the First Division, to qualify for the UEFA Cup, though for much of the season they were one of several teams who topped the table before a late surge from Liverpool saw Bob Paisley's team seal the title. Early in the season he had paid a national record £1.5 million for Bryan Robson from his old club West Bromwich Albion, and shortly afterwards also added midfielder Remi Moses, also from West Brom, and Arsenal striker Frank Stapleton to his ranks. He also gave a debut to promising young forward Norman Whiteside in April 1982, just before the player's 17th birthday.

In the 1982–83 season, two appearances at Wembley, one of which was an FA Cup victory against Brighton & Hove Albion, coupled with another third-place finish in the league, fuelled speculation that United were back in a big way. During the first half of the season, they had topped the league more than once but a storming run of form by Liverpool beginning before Christmas meant that the title headed for Anfield for the second year running. 1982–83 also saw the breakthrough of Whiteside as one of the best performing players in the First Division. Whiteside was also on the scoresheet for the FA Cup final replay as United beat Brighton 4–0 after drawing the first game 2–2.

In the 1983–84 season, Atkinson's side reached the semi-finals of the European Cup Winners' Cup although their defence of the FA Cup ended at the first hurdle with a shock 2–0 defeat at Third Division team AFC Bournemouth. They finished fourth in the league, having topped the table at several stages once again, before injuries to key players counted against them and they dropped points. The end of the season saw the sale of key midfielder Ray Wilkins to A.C. Milan of Italy for £1.5 million, while the duration of the season had seen the breakthrough of young striker Mark Hughes. Rather than plunge into the transfer market for a big name, Atkinson shifted Norman Whiteside into midfield to fill the gap left by Wilkins and allowed Hughes to form a partnership with the experienced Frank Stapleton.

In the 1984–85 season, United again won the FA Cup. However, Atkinson and his team were denied the chance of another European Cup Winners Cup campaign as the Heysel disaster at the European Cup final that year resulted in an indefinite ban from European competitions for all English clubs.

In the 1985–86 season, they won their first ten games of the league season and were unbeaten after their first fifteen games to build a comfortable lead at the top of the table that lasted into the new year. However, their form tailed off badly and they again finished fourth, with Liverpool finishing the season as league champions. With the ban on English clubs in European competitions continuing, there was not even the consolation of a UEFA Cup place. United's title chances were not helped by the fact that captain Bryan Robson was only available for half of United's league games due to injuries.

There was more disappointment for United's fans when the sale of Mark Hughes to Spanish club Barcelona was announced at the end of the season. Atkinson had prepared for Hughes' departure in March 1986 by paying Nottingham Forest £570,000 for England striker Peter Davenport. Although Davenport was their top scorer in the 1986–87 season, he failed to achieve the same success as Hughes and was not a popular figure among fans.

Despite media speculation that Atkinson would be sacked in favour of Aberdeen manager Alex Ferguson or Barcelona manager Terry Venables, the 1986–87 season began with Atkinson still at the helm. His two FA Cup wins and five successive top four league finishes had made him the most successful United manager since Matt Busby, but the pressure to build on the earlier successes was becoming more intense than ever. The 1986–87 season began poorly with three successive defeats, and despite a minor upturn in September and October which included a 5–1 home win over Southampton in the league, the pressure on Atkinson remained intense and the board finally ran out of patience on 6 November 1986 when he was dismissed as manager two days after a 4–1 exit at the hands of Southampton in the League Cup. United were still in the bottom four of the First Division with a third of the season already gone.

=== Return to West Bromwich Albion ===
Atkinson returned to West Brom in the autumn of 1987, by which time they had fallen into the Second Division and were battling against relegation to the Third Division. Survival was achieved, as Albion finished the 1987–88 season in 20th place, and they began the 1988–89 season well, looking like serious promotion contenders.

=== Atlético Madrid ===
Following his time at Manchester United, Atkinson was due to take charge of Atlético Madrid, however internal politics at Atlético delayed his appointment, with Atkinson returning to manage West Brom in the meantime. In October 1988, Atkinson was finally appointed manager of Atlético Madrid, winning his first game in charge 6–1 against Espanyol.

Atkinson's tenure at Atlético was quite a turbulent one and despite relative moderate success in terms of league position, a clash of personalities with the then-owner of the club, Jesús Gil, led to Atkinson being sacked after just three months as manager. His right-hand man at West Bromwich Albion, Colin Addison, was appointed, much to the disdain of Atkinson, who went on record in the English media as saying Addison had "stabbed him in the back". The pair never worked together again following the events at Atlético.

=== Sheffield Wednesday ===
Atkinson went on to manage Sheffield Wednesday from February 1989 to June 1991. Although the club were relegated to the Second Division in May 1990 after a 3–0 home defeat against Nottingham Forest, Atkinson secured promotion back to the First Division the following season. They also won the League Cup that year, beating Manchester United 1–0 at Wembley. On 31 May 1991 Atkinson stated he would be remaining as Wednesday's manager, only to leave for Aston Villa a week later, a move that upset many Sheffield Wednesday fans.

=== Aston Villa ===
Taking over from Jozef Venglos, Atkinson led Aston Villa to second place in the inaugural FA Premier League season in 1992–93 and to victory in the League Cup in 1994, securing (ultimately short-lived) UEFA Cup campaigns for both of these successes. As of 2025, Atkinson's second place remains the highest-ever finish by an English manager in the Premier League, subsequently equalled by Kevin Keegan in 1995–96.

Despite leading Villa to their first major success since their 1982 European Cup triumph, a mutual dislike between Villa chairman Doug Ellis and Atkinson that developed from 1992, inevitably resulted in him being sacked on 10 November 1994 following a 4–3 defeat at the hands of Wimbledon – three days after Ellis had given Atkinson a "vote of confidence" in the media, stating that Atkinson was one of England's "top three football managers". By this stage, an ageing Villa side that had so nearly won the league title 18 months earlier were now among the relegation battlers. He was replaced by Brian Little, who kept Villa in the top flight and built a new, younger team.

=== Coventry City ===
Three months after being sacked by Villa, Atkinson became manager at Coventry City replacing Phil Neal, who was purposely and acrimoniously sacked to make way for him. He took over in mid-February 1995, with the Sky Blues just above the Premier League relegation zone. His new team managed some good results, including a 4–2 home win over local rivals Leicester City, a 3–2 away win over Liverpool and a point against a Blackburn Rovers side who ended the season as champions. With survival looking certain several games before the season ended, Atkinson was named Premier League Manager of the Month for March 1995. The penultimate game of the season brought another fine result when the Sky Blues travelled to North London and beat Tottenham Hotspur 3–1. Survival was finally confirmed as Atkinson guided the Sky Blues to a 16th-place finish.

In December 1995, Atkinson guided the Sky Blues to one of their best results of the 1990s, a 5–0 home win over defending champions Blackburn Rovers. During his spell as manager of Coventry, he brought in high-profile players including Gordon Strachan, Noel Whelan and Gary McAllister (although in his autobiography he states that this latter signing was Strachan's initiative and he was opposed for tactical reasons) but they continued to struggle in the Premier League and in November 1996 he became Director of Football, handing over managerial duties to Strachan, who by then had retired as a player and had become assistant manager.

=== Return to Sheffield Wednesday ===
In November 1997, he returned to Sheffield Wednesday following the sacking of David Pleat. Wednesday had made a poor start to the 1997–98 season, including a 7–2 loss at Blackburn and a 6–1 loss at Manchester United. Under Atkinson, Wednesday's form picked up immediately and they pulled well clear of relegation trouble, but he was not offered a permanent contract and left the club at the end of the season.

=== Nottingham Forest ===
Atkinson's last managerial job came with Nottingham Forest, for the final four months of the 1998–99 season. This spell was not a success and at his first home game against Arsenal he even climbed into the wrong dug-out. He also angered a number of Forest fans following an 8–1 defeat at home to Manchester United when he stated in an interview after the game that his team had given the fans a "nine-goal thriller".

Atkinson took over as manager on 11 January 1999 and Forest's relegation was confirmed on 24 April with a 2–0 defeat at his old club Aston Villa. He announced his resignation as manager within hours of the final whistle, with effect from the final game of the league season on 16 May and said that he would be retiring from football management altogether.

== Broadcasting career ==
=== TV work ===
Atkinson was already working as a pundit for ITV Sport and after leaving management he continued in this role. For a number of years, he covered most of the channel's live matches, sometimes as a studio guest, but more often as the "ex-football insider" member of a two-man commentary team. His commentaries with Brian Moore and then Clive Tyldesley provided the basis for the 1990s and early-2000s ITV Champions League nights. He was also the main co-commentator for ITV's coverage of the European Championships and the World Cup during this period. He also fronted two series of Extra Time with Ron Atkinson for Central Television, with Ron interviewing football personalities like Kevin Keegan, Terry Venables and Martin O'Neill.

In 1997, he appeared as manager of Harchester United in Dream Team.

Following his unsuccessful short spell at Nottingham Forest in the 1998-99 season, Atkinson chose to step away from football management and prioritise his media punditry and commentary duties.

In August 2013, Atkinson became a housemate on the twelfth series of Celebrity Big Brother. He was the second housemate to be evicted on Day 9 after receiving the fewest votes to save him against Charlotte Crosby, Courtney Stodden, Lauren Harries and Louie Spence.

=== Music ===
In 2002, Atkinson released a Christmas song, "It's Christmas – Let's Give Love a Try", but this failed to gain chart success. The following year, Atkinson was a guest on an episode of TV chat show Room 101 and host Paul Merton played the video as an outro to the show.

=== Racist comments ===
Following his sacking from Atlético Madrid, club president Jesús Gil claimed Atkinson had racially abused his own player Donato during his final game in charge of the club against Barcelona in January 1989.

Atkinson resigned from ITV on 21 April 2004, after he made a racist comment live on air about the black Chelsea player Marcel Desailly; believing the microphone to be switched off, he said, "...he [Desailly] is what is known in some schools as a fucking lazy, thick nigger". Although transmission in the UK had finished, the microphone gaffe meant that his comment was broadcast to various countries in the Middle East. He also left his job as a columnist for The Guardian "by mutual agreement" as a result of the comment.

Carlton Palmer, one of Atkinson's players while he was manager at Sheffield Wednesday, defended Atkinson by saying, "I'm black and I'm sitting here and I'm gonna stand up for Big Ron not because he's a friend of mine; I'm standing up for him because I know what he's like as a bloke. If we're going to deal with racism then let's deal with the bigger picture of racism not about a throwaway comment that wasn't meant in that manner." A BBC Radio documentary about Batson, Cunningham and Regis, entitled Three Degrees West, repeated on 16 May 2004, was cancelled owing to Atkinson's central contributions.

Also in 2004, Atkinson said to an audience at Hillsborough Stadium: "The Chinese people have the best contraception in the world - their women are so ugly. I can't understand why there are so many of them."

On Celebrity Big Brother in 2013, he jokingly asked a fellow contestant, Irish doctor Danielle Marr, "you're not carrying a bomb with you, are you?", when she draped her jumper over her head like a headscarf.

=== Other TV work ===
It was reported Atkinson was being brought in to support Iffy Onuora at Swindon Town in December 2005, and Atkinson and the club appeared to confirm this. It later transpired that Atkinson's role was as part of a Sky One documentary about the club being filmed at the County Ground. In late January 2006, Atkinson and Swindon Town parted company, with Swindon manager Onuora citing interference as the main reason for stopping the documentary from going ahead. Just a week later the cameras turned up at Peterborough United's ground, London Road, to begin filming for the documentary called Big Ron Manager. Peterborough were paid £100,000 to allow the filming to take place.

Atkinson spent the 2006 World Cup recording an amateur video blog and distributing it through the UK-based video sharing site SelfcastTV.com. He also provided commentary on the World Cup for the UK digital channel UKTV G2.

In 2005 he appeared as a pundit on Football Italia broadcast on Bravo. He left the programme when Bravo lost the broadcast rights to Italian football.

In 2006, Atkinson took part in the BBC Two programme Excuse My French. Atkinson, comedian Marcus Brigstocke and television presenter Esther Rantzen were immersed in the French language by staying in a remote town in the Provence region, being compelled to adapt to the French lifestyle and speak the language. His assignment at the end of the course was to provide a match analysis on a football match (Paris Saint-Germain – Monaco) in French for a French radio station.

In 2008, Atkinson brought out an autobiography 60 Minutes with Ron Atkinson, in which he talks about his controversial comments and his football career.

Atkinson returned to the screen on 16 August 2009 on the Channel 4 reality show Celebrity Wife Swap. When questioned about his controversial comments by swappee Tessa Sanderson, he refused to discuss it.

Atkinson was a pundit on William Hill's The Punt podcast and on Manchester United's channel MUTV. In October 2019, he made a return to broadcasting, commentating on the six-a-side World Cup final in Crete, alongside UK commentator John Gwynne.

== Director of football ==
On 23 January 2007, Atkinson returned to Kettering Town, the club he had managed more than thirty years previously, as director of football. It was announced on 19 April 2007 that he had left the post at the Conference North club following his disapproval over the sacking of manager Morell Maison.

== Leisure Leagues ==
In December 2018, Atkinson was announced as an ambassador for worldwide six-a-side football firm Leisure Leagues; as part of the deal, he was to act as Director Of Football for the England six-a-side team.

== Managerial statistics ==
Managerial record by team and tenure
| Team | From | To | Record | | | | |
| Team | From | To | P | W | D | L | Win % |
|---|---|---|---|---|---|---|---|
| Kettering Town | 14 December 1971 | 22 November 1974 | | | | | |
| Cambridge United | 22 November 1974 | 12 January 1978 | 146 | 68 | 36 | 42 | 46.6 |
| West Bromwich Albion | 12 January 1978 | 9 June 1981 | 159 | 70 | 36 | 53 | 44.0 |
| Manchester United | 9 June 1981 | 6 November 1986 | 292 | 146 | 67 | 79 | 50.0 |
| West Bromwich Albion | 3 September 1987 | 12 October 1988 | 53 | 15 | 23 | 15 | 28.3 |
| Atlético Madrid | 12 October 1988 | 16 January 1989 | 12 | 6 | 3 | 3 | 50.0 |
| Sheffield Wednesday | 14 February 1989 | 6 June 1991 | 118 | 49 | 34 | 35 | 41.5 |
| Aston Villa | 7 June 1991 | 10 November 1994 | 178 | 77 | 56 | 45 | 43.3 |
| Coventry City | 15 February 1995 | 5 November 1996 | 74 | 19 | 28 | 27 | 25.7 |
| Sheffield Wednesday | 14 November 1997 | 17 May 1998 | 27 | 9 | 11 | 7 | 33.3 |
| Nottingham Forest | 11 January 1999 | 16 May 1999 | 17 | 5 | 2 | 10 | 29.4 |
| Total | | | 1,078 | 464 | 306 | 308 | 43.0 |

== Honours ==
=== Manager ===
Kettering Town

- Southern League Premier Division: 1972–73
- Southern League Division One North: 1971–72
- Northants Senior Cup: 1972–73

Cambridge United

- Football League Fourth Division: 1976–77

Manchester United

- FA Cup: 1982–83, 1984–85
- FA Charity Shield: 1983
- Football League Cup runner-up: 1982–83

Sheffield Wednesday

- Football League Cup: 1990–91

Aston Villa

- Football League Cup: 1993–94

Individual

- Premier League Manager of the Month: March 1995

== See also ==
- List of football managers with the most matches
- Celebrity Big Brother (British series 12)
- List of FA Cup winning managers
