= Dave Roberts (Welsh footballer) =

English-born Welsh footballer (born 1949)

Personal information
- Full name: David Frazer Roberts
- Date of birth: 26 November 1949 (age 76)
- Place of birth: Southampton, England
- Height: 5 ft 11 in (1.80 m)
- Position: Defender

Senior career*
Years	Team	Apps	(Gls)
1968–1971	Fulham	22	(0)
1971–1975	Oxford United	161	(7)
1975–1978	Hull City	86	(4)
1977	→ Chicago Sting (loan)	13	(0)
1978–1981	Cardiff City	41	(2)
1981–?	Tsuen Wan	?	(?)
Total		301	(13)

International career
1973–1978	Wales	17	(0)
- * Club domestic league appearances and goals

David Frazer Roberts (born 26 November 1949) is a Welsh retired footballer who played for Fulham, Oxford United, Hull City, and Cardiff City. During his spell at Oxford United F.C, he played 161 league games. He made 17 appearances in the Welsh national team, 6 of those while at Oxford United.
