= Neil Slatter =

Welsh footballer

Personal information
- Full name: Neil John Slatter
- Date of birth: 30 May 1964 (age 62)
- Place of birth: Cardiff, Wales
- Position: Defender

Youth career
- Bristol Rovers

Senior career*
Years	Team	Apps	(Gls)
1980–1985	Bristol Rovers	148	(4)
1985–1990	Oxford United	91	(6)
1990	→ A.F.C. Bournemouth (loan)	6	(0)
Total		245	(10)

International career
	Wales Under-21	6	(0)
1983–1989	Wales	22	(2)
- * Club domestic league appearances and goals

Neil Slatter (born 30 May 1964, in Cardiff) is a Welsh former professional footballer, who played at left back. He began his career with Bristol Rovers in 1980, where he remained for five years before moving on to Oxford United. He also had a loan spell with A.F.C. Bournemouth in 1990, and ended his career after making a single appearance for Gloucester City.

Rise to fame

At the age of 16 Slatter furthered his career by being spotted and being chosen to play for the Wales national football team along with Ian Rush and Mark Hughes. Slatter became the youngest player to represent Wales at that time. In all, he was capped 21 times for his country.

Health Issues

Slatter suffered a severe knee injury which ended his career in 1991 at the age of 27.
