= Alan Willey (footballer, born 1941) =

English footballer

Personal information
- Date of birth: 16 September 1941
- Place of birth: Exeter, England
- Date of death: 28 April 2017 (aged 75)
- Position: Forward

Senior career*
Years	Team	Apps	(Gls)
19??–1960	Bridgwater Town		
1961–1966	Oxford United	128	(48)
1966–19??	Millwall	10	(0)
- * Club domestic league appearances and goals

Alan Willey (16 September 1941 – 28 April 2017) was an English professional footballer who played for Bridgwater Town, Millwall and Oxford United. Having started out in football as a groundstaff boy for Exeter City, he signed for Bridgwater Town before moving to Oxford United for £300. He joined Millwall in 1966.
