= Colin Clarke (footballer, born 1946) =

Scottish footballer and manager

Personal information
- Date of birth: 4 April 1946 (age 80)
- Place of birth: Glasgow, Scotland
- Height: 6 ft 1 in (1.85 m)
- Position: Central defender

Youth career
- –1963: Arthurlie

Senior career*
Years	Team	Apps	(Gls)
1963–1965	Arsenal	0	(0)
1965–1978	Oxford United	444	(23)
1978	Los Angeles Aztecs	17	(0)
1978–1979	Plymouth Argyle	35	(3)
1979–1982	Kettering Town	0	(0)
Total		496	(26)

Managerial career
- 1979–1982: Kettering Town
- * Club domestic league appearances and goals

Colin Clarke (born 4 April 1946) is a Scottish former professional football player and manager. Clarke, who played as a central defender, spent the majority of his career in England – minus a one-season stint in the North American Soccer League – and made nearly 500 career league appearances.

== Career ==
Born in Glasgow, Clarke began his career in his native Scotland with Arthurlie, before moving to English giants Arsenal in 1963. Clarke never made a league appearance for Arsenal, and later played for Oxford United, the Los Angeles Aztecs, and Plymouth Argyle before becoming player-manager of Kettering Town.

== Coaching career ==
Clarke spent three years in charge of Kettering Town. In July 1991, Clarke became assistant manager at Lincoln City. After six months in the role, the club activated a contractual clause to cancel his two-year contract following his failure to relocate his home to Lincoln as agreed. In July 1992 he became youth development officer at Reading but lasted just four months before departing with the Royals youth team bottom of the South East Counties League Division Two. He was then appointed youth team coach at Aston Villa in February 1993.

In 2003 he was appointed assistant head men's soccer coach at the University of Tulsa. He was named both the 2009 NSCAA Midwest Region Assistant Coach of the Year, and the 2009 National Soccer Coaches Association of America Assistant Coach of the Year. After nine seasons at Tulsa, the conclusion of the 2011 season saw Clarke announce his retirement from coaching.

== Honours ==
=== Oxford United ===
- Third Division – Winner 1968
