= Paul Kee =

Northern Irish footballer (born 1969)

Personal information
- Date of birth: 8 November 1969 (age 56)
- Place of birth: Belfast, Northern Ireland
- Height: 6 ft 3 in (1.91 m)
- Position: Goalkeeper

Senior career*
Years	Team	Apps	(Gls)
1987–1988	Ards	22	(0)
1988–1994	Oxford United	56	(0)
1992–1993	→ Wimbledon (loan)	0	(0)
1993–1994	Ards	4	(0)
1993–1994	Reading	0	(0)
1994–1998	Ards	54	(0)
1997–1998	Linfield	0	(0)
1992–1993	Cobh Ramblers	?	(0)
1998–2000	Carrick Rangers	53	(0)
2000–2001	Bangor	10	(0)
2001–2003	Crusaders	54	(0)
2003–2004	Glentoran	0	(0)
- Brantwood
- Greenwell Star F.C.

International career
1990–1994	Northern Ireland	9	(0)
1990	Northern Ireland U21	1	(0)
- * Club domestic league appearances and goals

Paul Kee (born 8 November 1969) is a Northern Irish former footballer who played for Oxford United, Ards and Reading. During his spell at Oxford, he played 56 league games. He made 9 appearances for Northern Ireland over a four-year period. Paul is currently employer as an Usher in the Northern Ireland Assembly.

== Career ==
A product of East-Belfast junior football, Paul Kee was one of the brightest young goalkeepers in the Irish League, picking up Northern Ireland caps at Under-15, Under-16 and Under-18 level. Following a short Irish League career with Ards, he joined Oxford United at the age of 18 in June 1988, making his League debut in a Division Two clash away to Middlesbrough on 25 November 1989. At 20, he made his full international debut in a friendly against Norway in March 1990. The game ended in a 3–2 defeat, and the following month he played in an Under-21 game against Israel in Coleraine.

During the 1990–91 season, Kee played in every one of Northern Ireland's games and during the 4–1 defeat by Yugoslavia in March 1991 he is reported to have gone to his gloves bag, pulled out a white handkerchief and waved it. A month later, there followed one of the most embarrassing results in Northern Ireland's history, a 1–1 home draw with minnows the Faroe Islands.

The following season, Kee had dropped down the pecking order at Oxford, and also lost his place in the Northern Ireland squad to Tommy Wright and Alan Fettis. Over the next few seasons he made intermittent appearances for Oxford and spent several spells out on loan, including back at Ards. He made his final League appearance for Oxford at home to Portsmouth on 14 September 1993, and the following summer he returned to Ards on a permanent deal.

Early in the 1994–95 season, Northern Ireland were suffering a goalkeeping crisis, and with both Fettis and Wright injured, Kee was recalled to the squad along with Linfield's Wes Lamont. In October 1994, Kee put in an excellent performance in 2–1 victory in Austria but a month later he was responsible for at least two of the goals in a 4–0 home defeat by the Republic of Ireland. The return to fitness of Alan Fettis in 1995 finally ended any hopes Kee had of winning further caps.

Kee spent the next decade playing football for a number of clubs all over Ireland. During a season at Cobh Ramblers, he took over the goalkeeping position from Nicky Byrne, who would later go on to find worldwide fame as a member of the pop group Westlife. He spent the latter part of the 2001 season as goalkeeping coach at Bohemians Kee announced his retirement from playing at the end of the 2002–03 season, though he agreed to act as back-up 'keeper for Glentoran through the following campaign. The form and fitness of Elliott Morris meant he was never called upon.

Kee went on to join the Glentoran staff as Goalkeeping Coach. He fulfilled the same role with Bangor and Brantwood FC as an outfield player, and from August 2010 with Ards until November 2011 joining Greenwell Star FC of the Down Area Winter League in Northern Ireland as Goalkeeping Coach and has also recently signed as a player. Paul was recently interviewed by former children's television presenter Timmy Mallett during his cycling tour of the United Kingdom and Northern Ireland and discussed his former footballing career and new role as a gatekeeper for the Stormont Assembly.
