= Tony Jones (footballer) =

English footballer

Personal information
- Date of birth: 12 November 1937
- Place of birth: Birmingham, England
- Date of death: 24 April 1990 aged 52
- Position: Midfielder

Youth career
- Birmingham City

Senior career*
Years	Team	Apps	(Gls)
1959–1968	Oxford United	319	(89)
1968–1969	Newport County	54	(9)
1969–?	Witney Town		
1969–1970	Cheltenham Town		
- * Club domestic league appearances and goals

Tony Jones (12 November 1937 – 1990) was an English footballer who played for Oxford United, Newport County and Witney Town. During his spell at Oxford, he played 319 league games, and he is eleventh highest in the overall list of appearances. Jones is also third in the all-time goalscoring list.
