= Hugh Curran =

Scottish footballer (1943–2026)

Personal information
- Full name: Hugh Patrick Curran
- Date of birth: 25 September 1943
- Place of birth: Carstairs, Lanarkshire, Scotland
- Date of death: 2 September 2026 (aged 82)
- Position: Forward

Youth career
- 1954–1960: Home Farm
- 1960–1962: Shamrock Rovers
- 1962: Manchester United

Senior career*
Years	Team	Apps	(Gls)
1962–1963	Third Lanark	9	(4)
1963–1964	Corby Town		
1964–1966	Millwall	57	(26)
1966–1969	Norwich City	112	(46)
1969–1972	Wolverhampton Wanderers	82	(40)
1972–1974	Oxford United	70	(28)
1974–1977	Bolton Wanderers	47	(13)
1977–1979	Oxford United	35	(11)
Total		412	(168)

International career
1969–1971	Scotland	5	(1)

Managerial career
- Banbury United
- * Club domestic league appearances and goals

Hugh Patrick Curran (25 September 1943 – 2 September 2026) was a Scottish footballer who played as a forward and spent the majority of his career in the English Football League. He played in five full international matches for Scotland between 1969 and 1971.

== Career ==
Curran began his career at Home Farm when his family moved to Dublin in 1954. After 6 years playing at all grades he moved to Shamrock Rovers to gain experience. After a period as an apprentice at Manchester United he was released and returned to his native Scotland with Third Lanark as a semi-pro where he struggled to see much first team action, instead joining Corby Town.

Spotted by Millwall, Curran signed professional forms at The Den in March 1964. Finishing his first full season with 19 goals, he was the club's leading scorer as they won promotion from the fourth tier in 1965. This proved to be his only full campaign for Millwall, as he moved to Norwich City in January 1966. Serving the Carrow Road club for three years in the second flight, Curran scored 53 goals in total and was voted their player of the year in 1968.

In January 1969, Curran joined Wolverhampton Wanderers in a £60,000 deal. He finished his first full season in the First Division as the leading goalscorer at Molineux with 23 goals, adding a further 20 in the following campaign. Curran scored the first goal in an English league match to be broadcast live in Norway, Denmark and Sweden, when he netted the only goal of a game against Sunderland on 29 November 1969.

During his time at Wolves, Curran was selected to represent the Scotland national team; making his debut on 5 November 1969 in a 2–0 World Cup qualifying loss in Austria. He won five caps in total, over an 18-month period, his one goal coming against England in a 3–1 defeat at Wembley in May 1971.

The emergence of John Richards at Wolves saw Curran's appearances limited to just eight matches during the 1971–72 season. His final game for the club was in the second leg of the 1972 UEFA Cup Final where they lost out on the trophy to their countrymen Tottenham Hotspur. Out of contention, Curran departed Wolves with the impressive tally of 47 goals from his 98 appearances.

He left Wolves in September 1972, joining second-flight Oxford United for £50,000. Despite being their leading scorer in both the 1972–73 and 1973–74 campaigns – with 17 and 14 goals respectively – he departed the Manor Ground in September 1974, joining Bolton Wanderers for £40,000. After three seasons, in which he featured more than 50 times for the Burnden Park club, Curran returned to Oxford United in 1977, where he remained until retiring due to injury in 1979.

== Later life and death ==
After football, Curran went into business in his native Carstairs Junction, before running a hotel with his brother Ronald in Carnwath, Lanarkshire. He then entered the licensing trade, running four pubs, all of which were called The Red Lion; three in Oxfordshire (Marston, Horton-cum-Studley and Islip) and one in London. After six months of retirement in 2005, Curran was "bored to tears" and decided to get a job as a supervisor at Oxford's Thornhill park-and-ride service.

Curran died on 2 September 2026, aged 82.

== Sources ==
- Davage, Mark; Eastwood, John; Platt, Kevin (2001). Canary Citizens. Jarrold Publishing. ISBN 0-7117-2020-7.
