= Peter Foley (footballer) =

Footballer (born 1956)

Peter Foley MBE
Personal information
- Date of birth: 10 September 1956 (age 70)
- Place of birth: Bicester, England
- Height: 5 ft 11 in (1.80 m)
- Position: Striker

Senior career*
| Years | Team | Apps | (Gls) |
| 1974–1983 | Oxford United | 277 | (71) |
| 1982–1983 | → Gillingham (loan) | 5 | (0) |
| 1983–1984 | Bulova SA | | |
| 1984–1985 | Aldershot | 9 | (2) |
| 1985–1986 | Witney Town | | |
| 1986–1987 | Exeter City | 1 | (0) |
| 1990–1993 | Oxford City | 18 | (1) |
| Total | | 292 | (73) |

International career
- Republic of Ireland U21

Managerial career
- 1991–1994: Oxford City
- 2000–2002: Marlow
- 2002–2004: Brackley Town
- 2004: Didcot Town
- * Club domestic league appearances and goals

Peter Foley (born 10 September 1956) is a retired footballer who played as striker. Born in England, he went on to captain the Republic of Ireland U21 national team. He was selected to represent Ireland at full international level, however a clash of fixtures with his club prevented him from doing so.

== Career ==
Born in Bicester, England, Foley is Oxford United's joint fourth leading goalscorer of all time. He also captained the Republic of Ireland under-21 national team. He had to pull out of playing against Malta for the first team due to Oxford playing a vital league match the same evening and the club would not release him to represent his country. He also played for Gillingham, on loan from Oxford, Bulova in Hong Kong, Iggesund HIF in Sweden, and Exeter City.

He later managed at non-league level taking Isthmian League Premier Division side Marlow to the 3rd round proper of the FA Cup beating his old club Oxford United 2–0 in the first round.
