= David Sloan (footballer) =

Northern Ireland footballer

Personal information
- Date of birth: 28 October 1941
- Place of birth: Lisburn, Northern Ireland
- Date of death: 4 February 2016 (aged 74)
- Height: 5 ft 7 in (1.70 m)
- Position: Midfielder

Senior career*
| Years | Team | Apps | (Gls) |
| 1961–1963 | Bangor | | |
| 1963–1967 | Scunthorpe United | 136 | (42) |
| 1967–1973 | Oxford United | 174 | (29) |
| 1973–1975 | Walsall | 49 | (3) |
| Total | | 359 | (74) |

International career
| 1968–1970 | Northern Ireland | 2 | (0) |
- * Club domestic league appearances and goals

David Sloan (28 October 1941 – 4 February 2016) was a Northern Irish professional footballer who played for Scunthorpe United, Oxford United and Walsall. He also made two international appearances for Northern Ireland while at Oxford United, in the process becoming the first player to receive an international cap whilst at the club.
