= Graham Atkinson =

English footballer

Personal information
- Date of birth: 17 May 1943
- Place of birth: Liverpool, England
- Date of death: 5 January 2017 (aged 73)
- Position: Striker

Youth career
- 1958–1962: Aston Villa

Senior career*
Years	Team	Apps	(Gls)
1962–1974	Oxford United	356	(77)
- * Club domestic league appearances and goals

Graham Atkinson (17 May 1943 – 5 January 2017) was an English footballer. He was a stalwart at Oxford United in their initial years in the Football League (1962–1974). His brother is Ron Atkinson.

== Playing career ==
Graham Atkinson was born in Liverpool four years after his brother Ron Atkinson and joined Aston Villa's groundstaff at the age of 15 but, like his brother Ron, failed to make the first team. He was released for the occasional game for Headington United (the team later to become Oxford United) during 1959–60 and before reaching his 17th birthday (when he could have signed full-time for Aston Villa), he signed for the Southern Leaguers. He developed in the Reserves during his first season, but came to the fore at inside-right in the second of the two successive championship years (1961–62).

Atkinson made history by scoring Oxford United's first goal in the Football League on 18 August 1962 at Barrow. He often found it difficult to score consistently and received criticism from sections of the home crowd. After being tried at right-half in the Reserves, he left in April 1963 for a loan spell at Cambridge United. He missed out on Oxford United's F.A. Cup glories of 1963–64, but after his return from loan, midway through the following term, he was a revelation.

He was a far more complete striker and for four years was the mainstay of the goalscoring department. From 1968, Atkinson's vision and passing ability were used to excellent effect in the Second Division. The bulk of the 1972–73 season was lost to injury, but he came back as good as ever until he left at the end of the 1973–74 season to join Ron Atkinson at Kettering Town. He remains Oxford United's leading goalscorer, with 77 league goals, and 107 in all competitions.

== Death ==
Atkinson died from cancer on 5 January 2017.
