= Jason Seacole =

English footballer

Personal information
- Date of birth: 11 April 1960 (age 66)
- Place of birth: Oxford, England
- Position: Midfielder

Senior career*
Years	Team	Apps	(Gls)
1976–1982	Oxford United	120	(22)
1982–1986	Witney Town		
1986–1988	Wycombe Wanderers	57	(14)
1988–	Witney Town		

International career
1975	England Schoolboys	9	(6)
1977–78	England Youth	6	(2)
- * Club domestic league appearances and goals

Jason Seacole (born 11 April 1960) is an English former footballer who played for Oxford United and Wycombe Wanderers. During his spell at Oxford, he became the youngest player to play for the club since it joined the Football League, making his debut as a substitute in a Third Division fixture against Mansfield Town on 7 September 1976 aged just 16 years and 149 days. He is also the club's youngest scorer in the league.
