= Bud Houghton =

English footballer (1936–1994)

Personal information
- Full name: Harry Brian Houghton
- Date of birth: 1 September 1936
- Place of birth: Madras, British India
- Date of death: 1994 (aged 57–58)
- Position(s): Forward

Senior career*
Years	Team	Apps	(Gls)
1954–1957	Bradford Park Avenue	28	(7)
1957–1958	Birmingham City	4	(1)
1958–1961	Southend United	68	(32)
1961–1963	Oxford United	106	(69)
1963–1965	Lincoln City	54	(22)
1965–1967	Chelmsford City		
- Cambridge United
- Wellington Town
- Cheltenham Town
- Morris Motors
- *Club domestic league appearances and goals

Harry Brian "Bud" Houghton (1 September 1936 – 1994), also known as Harry Houghton, was an English professional footballer who played as a forward. He scored 79 goals in 207 appearances in the Football League playing for Bradford Park Avenue, Birmingham City, Southend United, Oxford United and Lincoln City.

== Career ==
Houghton was born in Madras to an Anglo-Indian family who emigrated to England in 1947 when India gained independence from British rule. He joined Bradford Park Avenue as an amateur in 1954, and turned professional the following year. In 1957 First Division club Birmingham City paid £5,250 for his services, but he rarely appeared; a burly man, his bustling style did not answer Birmingham's need for a more mobile centre forward. A year later he moved on to Southend United, where he had more playing time. In two and a half years he played 73 games in all competitions and scored 33 goals, and was leading scorer in the 1958–59 season with 20 goals.

Arthur Turner, who had signed Houghton for Birmingham and was then managing Oxford United, paid £2,000 for his services in March 1961. In what remained of the 1960–61 season, Houghton scored 13 goals, including 5 in a 7–2 defeat of Boston United, as Oxford won the championship of the Southern League. He continued in prolific vein: the 1961–62 season brought 39 goals from 39 league games, and 43 from 42 games in all competitions, as Oxford won the Southern League title for the second year running and were elected to the Football League for the first time. Houghton was unable to maintain that rate of scoring in the Football League, though he finished leading scorer for the second consecutive season, with 16 league goals, and scored in Oxford's first ever game in the Football League, on the opening day of the 1962–63 season against Barrow.

In October 1963, Houghton joined fellow Fourth Division side Lincoln City for a fee of £6,000. He was made captain, but after a poor start to the 1964–65 season, Lincoln's directors took over team selection duties from manager Bill Anderson and relieved Houghton of the captaincy in favour of Brian Jackson. He scored 25 goals in 61 games in all competitions during an 18-month stay, and then returned to the Southern League with successively Chelmsford City, Cambridge United, Wellington Town and Cheltenham Town.

He died in 1994.

== Honours ==
Oxford United

- Southern League: 1960–61, 1961–62
