= John Shuker =

English footballer (1942–2019)

Personal information
- Date of birth: 8 May 1942
- Place of birth: Eccles, Greater Manchester, England
- Date of death: 29 December 2019 (aged 77)
- Position: Defender

Senior career*
Years	Team	Apps	(Gls)
1962–1977	Oxford United	478	(46)

Managerial career
- Clanfield
- 2001–02: Witney Academy
- * Club domestic league appearances and goals

John Shuker (8 May 1942 – 29 December 2019) was an English professional footballer, notable for holding the club record of league appearances for Oxford United. He was with the club on their election to the Football League in 1962 and over the next 15 years played 478 times in the Second, Third and Fourth Divisions.

Shuker was born in Eccles, Greater Manchester. He joined Oxford in 1961, originally playing as a winger. He made his debut in August 1962 and went on to captain the side, playing in a variety of positions. He was awarded a testimonial in 1972, culminating in a match between Oxford and Manchester City at the Manor Ground on 5 May 1972.

His last game for Oxford came in April 1977.

He was a manager for Clanfield.

In May 2001, Shuker was appointed as Director of Football at Milton United. In August 2001, Shuker was appointed as manager of Hellenic League side Witney Academy, staying until February 2002 when the club folded after months after problems with player availability.
