= 2024–25 Oxford United F.C. season =

English football club season

Oxford United
2024–25 season
- Owner: Sumrith Thanakarnjanasuth
- Chairman: Grant Ferguson
- Head Coach: Des Buckingham (until 15 December); Gary Rowett (from 20 December)
- Stadium: Kassam Stadium
- Championship: 17th
- FA Cup: Third round
- EFL Cup: Second round
- Top goalscorer: League: Mark Harris (6 goals); All: Mark Harris (6 goals)
- Average home league attendance: 11,358
Home colours	Away colours	Third colours

The 2024–25 season was the 131st season in the history of Oxford United Football Club. It was their first season back in the Championship (the second tier of English football) since the 1998–99 season, following their promotion from League One via the play-offs the previous season. In addition to the domestic league, the club also participated in the FA Cup, and the EFL Cup. The club guaranteed Championship survival with a game to spare and finished the season in 17th place in the division.

== Players ==
As of 10 January 2025

No.	Player	Position	Nationality	Place of birth	Date of birth (age)	Signed from	Date signed	Fee	Contract end
Goalkeepers
1	Jamie Cumming	GK	(England)	Winchester	4 September 1999 (age 27)	Chelsea	27 June 2024	Undisclosed	
13	Simon Eastwood	GK	(England)	Luton	26 June 1989 (age 37)	Blackburn Rovers	1 July 2016	Free transfer	30 June 2025
21	Matt Ingram	GK	(England)	High Wycombe	18 December 1993 (age 32)	Hull City	19 July 2024	Undisclosed	–
Defenders
2	Sam Long	RB	(England)	Oxford	16 January 1995 (age 31)	Academy	1 July 2013	–	30 June 2026
3	Ciaron Brown	LB	(Northern Ireland)	(England) Hillingdon	14 January 1998 (age 28)	(Wales) Cardiff City	1 July 2022	Free transfer	30 June 2025
5	Elliott Moore	CB	(England)	Coalville	16 March 1997 (age 29)	Leicester City	1 August 2019	Undisclosed	–
12	Joe Bennett	LB	(England)	Rochdale	28 March 1990 (age 36)	Free agent	30 November 2023	Free transfer	30 June 2024
16	Ben Nelson	CB	(England)	Northampton	18 March 2004 (age 22)	Leicester City	30 August 2024	Loan	30 June 2025
22	Greg Leigh	LB	(Jamaica)	(England) Manchester	30 September 1994 (age 32)	Ipswich Town	24 August 2023	Undisclosed	–
24	Hidde ter Avest	RB	(Netherlands)	Wierden	20 May 1997 (age 29)	FC Utrecht	19 August 2024	Free transfer	-
30	Peter Kioso	RB	(Democratic Republic of the Congo)	Dublin	15 August 1999 (age 27)	(England) Rotherham United	24 June 2024	Undisclosed	
34	Jordan Thorniley	CB	(England)	Warrington	24 November 1996 (age 29)	Blackpool	1 July 2023	Free transfer	–
35	James Golding	CB	(Republic of Ireland)	(England) Sutton	10 August 2004 (age 22)	Academy	1 July 2023	N/A	30 June 2027
Midfielders
4	Will Vaulks	MF	(Wales)	Wirral	13 September 1993 (age 33)	Sheffield Wednesday	1 July 2024	Free transfer	
6	Josh McEachran	CM	(England)	Oxford	1 March 1993 (age 33)	MK Dons	1 July 2023	Free transfer	–
8	Cameron Brannagan	CM	(England)	Manchester	9 May 1996 (age 30)	Liverpool	11 January 2018	Undisclosed	–
14	Louie Sibley	CM	(England)	Burton upon Trent	13 December 2001 (age 24)	Derby County F.C.	3 July 2024	Free transfer	–
15	Idris El Mizouni	CM	(Tunisia)	(France) Paris	26 September 2000 (age 26)	Ipswich Town	9 July 2024	£400,000	
18	Alex Matos	CM	(England)	Bedford	3 October 2004 (age 22)	Chelsea	10 January 2025	Loan	30 June 2025
19	Tyler Goodrham	RM	(Republic of Ireland)	(England) High Wycombe	7 August 2003 (age 23)	Academy	1 July 2021	N/A	30 June 2027
29	Kyle Edwards	AM	(England)	Dudley	17 February 1998 (age 28)	Oxford United (Note: Edwards suffered a season-ending injury during the previous campaign but he stayed at Oxford United through his recovery. His contract was allowed to lapse at the end of the season but he re-signed for the club two months later.)	3 September 2024	Free	1 January 2025
Forwards
7	Przemysław Płacheta	LW	(Poland)	Łowicz	23 March 1998 (age 28)	(Wales) Swansea City	15 July 2024	Free transfer	–
9	Mark Harris	ST	(Wales)	Swansea	29 December 1998 (age 27)	(Wales) Cardiff City	11 July 2023	Free transfer	30 June 2026
10	Matt Phillips	LW	(Scotland)	(England) Aylesbury	31 March 1991 (age 35)	West Bromwich Albion	1 August 2024	Free transfer	–
11	Ole Romeny	FW	(Indonesia)	Nijmegen	20 June 2000 (age 26)	FC Utrecht	5 January 2025	Undisclosed	-
17	Owen Dale	RW	(England)	Warrington	1 November 1998 (age 28)	Blackpool	1 February 2024	Undisclosed	–
20	Rúben Rodrigues	ST	(Portugal)	Oliveira de Azeméis	2 September 1996 (age 30)	Notts County	1 July 2023	Free transfer	–
23	Siriki Dembélé	ST	(Scotland)	(Ivory Coast) Bouaflé	7 September 1996 (age 30)	Birmingham City	29 August 2024	Undisclosed	–
25	Will Goodwin	ST	(England)	Tarporley	7 May 2002 (age 24)	Cheltenham Town	19 January 2024	£400,000	–
27	Max Woltman	ST	(England)	Wirral	20 August 2003 (age 23)	Liverpool	30 August 2023	Undisclosed	–
28	Marselino Ferdinan	FW	(Indonesia)	Jakarta	9 September 2004 (age 22)	K.M.S.K. Deinze	19 August 2024	Free transfer	–
44	Dane Scarlett	ST	(England)	Hillingdon	24 March 2004 (age 22)	Tottenham Hotspur	12 August 2024	30 June 2025	–
Out on loan
–	Stuart Findlay	CB	(Scotland)	Rutherglen	14 September 1995 (age 31)	(United States) Philadelphia Union	19 July 2022	Undisclosed	30 June 2026
28	Stephan Negru	CB	(Republic of Ireland)	Dublin	24 July 2002 (age 24)	(Ireland) Shelbourne	1 January 2023	Undisclosed	30 June 2026
-	Edward McGinty	GK	(Republic of Ireland)	Motherwell	5 August 1999 (age 27)	Sligo Rovers	21 July 2022	Undisclosed	30 June 2025
31	Eddie Brearey	GK	(England)	Chipping Norton	9 June 2004 (age 22)	Academy	1 July 2022	N/A	–
33	Jacob Knightbridge	GK	(England)	Brentwood	25 January 2004 (age 22)	West Ham United	1 July 2024	Free transfer	–
36	Josh Johnson	CM	(England)	Westminster	26 September 2004 (age 22)	Academy	21 October 2022	N/A	30 June 2025
39	Gatlin O'Donkor	FW	(England)	Reading	14 October 2004 (age 22)	Academy	August 2022	N/A	–
26	Jack Currie	LB	(England)	Kingston upon Thames	16 December 2001 (age 24)	(England) AFC Wimbledon	5 July 2024	Undisclosed	

== Transfers ==
=== In ===
Date	Pos.	Player	From	Fee	Ref.
1 July 2024 (Note: The transfer was announced on 12 June, and would become official on July 1 once his West Ham United contract expired)	GK	Jacob Knightbridge (ENG)	West Ham United (ENG)	Free	
1 July 2024 (Note: The transfer was announced on 11 June, and would become official on July 1 once his Sheffield Wednesday contract expired)	DM	Will Vaulks (WAL)	Sheffield Wednesday (ENG)	Free	
3 July 2024	CM	Louie Sibley (ENG)	Derby County (ENG)	Free	
5 July 2024	LB	Jack Currie (ENG)	AFC Wimbledon (ENG)	Undisclosed	
9 July 2024	CM	Idris El Mizouni (TUN)	Ipswich Town (ENG)	£400,000	
15 July 2024	LW	Przemysław Płacheta (POL)	Swansea City (WAL)	Free	
19 July 2024	GK	Matt Ingram (ENG)	Hull City (ENG)	Undisclosed	
1 August 2024	RW	Matt Phillips (SCO)	West Bromwich Albion (ENG)	Free	
19 August 2024	AM	Marselino Ferdinan (IDN)	Deinze (BEL)	Free	
19 August 2024	RB	Hidde ter Avest (NED)	FC Utrecht (NED)	Free	
29 August 2024	LW	Siriki Dembélé (SCO)	Birmingham City (ENG)	Undisclosed	
3 September 2024	AM	Kyle Edwards (ENG)		Free	
5 January 2025	RW	Ole Romeny (IDN)	Utrecht (NED)	Undisclosed	
16 January 2025	CF	Tom Bradshaw (WAL)	Millwall (ENG)	Undisclosed	
17 January 2025	CB	Michał Helik (POL)	Huddersfield Town (ENG)	Undisclosed	
31 January 2025	RW	Stanley Mills (ENG)	Everton (ENG)	Undisclosed	

=== Out ===
Date	Pos.	Player	To	Fee	Ref.
23 August 2024	DM	Marcus McGuane (ENG)	Bristol City (ENG)	Undisclosed	
6 January 2025	CM	Tobias Brenan (ENG)	Wigan Athletic (ENG)	Free	
3 February 2025	LW	Kyle Edwards (ENG)	Stevenage (ENG)	Free	

=== Loaned in ===
Date	Pos.	Player	From	Date unil	Ref.
2 August 2024	RW	Malcolm Ebiowei (ENG)	Crystal Palace (ENG)	3 January 2025 (Note: On 3 January, Ebiowei was recalled to Crystal Palace)	
12 August 2024	CF	Dane Scarlett (ENG)	Tottenham Hotspur (ENG)	20 January 2025 (Note: On 20 January, Scarlett was recalled to Tottenham)	
30 August 2024	CB	Ben Nelson (ENG)	Leicester City (ENG)	End of Season	
10 January 2025	CM	Alex Matos (ENG)	Chelsea (ENG)	End of Season	

=== Loaned out ===
Date	Pos.	Player	To	Date until	Ref.
1 July 2024 (Note: The loan was announced on 4 June, and would officially commence on July 1)	CB	Stuart Findlay (SCO)	Kilmarnock (SCO)	End of Season	
1 July 2024 (Note: The loan was announced on 29 June, and would officially commence on July 1)	CB	Stephan Negru (IRL)	Salford City (ENG)	9 January 2025 (Note: On 9 January, Negru was recalled from his loan with Salford)	
24 January 2024	GK	Edward McGinty (IRL)	Sligo Rovers (IRL)	1 November 2024 (Note: The League of Ireland is a summer league and McGinty's loan was extended at the end of the English season to allow him to remain at the club until the end of the Irish season)	
23 July 2024	GK	Jacob Knightbridge (ENG)	Braintree Town (ENG)	23 January 2025	
5 August 2024	GK	Eddie Brearey (ENG)	Beaconsfield Town (ENG)	1 July 2025	
7 August 2024	MF	Joshua Johnson (ENG)	Maidenhead United (ENG)	1 July 2025	
30 August 2024	CF	Gatlin O'Donkor (ENG)	Bristol Rovers (ENG)	End of Season	
30 August 2024	DF	Jack Currie (ENG)	Leyton Orient (ENG)	End of Season	
5 September 2024	CB	James Golding (IRL)	Maidenhead United (ENG)	1 January 2025	
5 January 2025	CF	Will Goodwin (ENG)	Wigan Athletic (ENG)	End of Season	
23 January 2025	CB	Stephan Negru (IRL)	Salford City (ENG)	End of Season	
24 January 2025	CM	Louie Sibley (ENG)	Rotherham United (ENG)	End of Season	
3 February 2025	RW	Owen Dale (ENG)	Wigan Athletic (ENG)	End of Season	

=== Released or out of contract ===
Date	Pos.	Player	Subsequent club	Join date	Ref.
30 June 2024	LW	Josh Murphy (ENG)	Portsmouth (ENG)	1 July 2024	
30 June 2024	LB	Steve Seddon (ENG)	Motherwell (SCO)	2 July 2024	
30 June 2024	RW	Billy Bodin (WAL)	Burton Albion (ENG)	8 July 2024	
30 June 2024	RM	James Henry (ENG)	Aldershot Town (ENG)	3 August 2024	
30 June 2024	AM	Marcus Browne (ENG)	AFC Wimbledon (ENG)	14 January 2025	
30 June 2024	AM	Kyle Edwards (ENG)	Oxford United (ENG)	3 September 2024	

== Pre-season and friendlies ==
On 31 May, Oxford United announced their first pre-season friendly, against Oxford City. Five days later, a behind closed doors fixture versus Exeter City was confirmed. On 25 June, it was confirmed the club would also travel to face Mansfield Town. Three days later, two further friendlies wers added, against Palermo and Solihull Moors.

Win Draw Loss Fixtures

11 July 2024 Friendly	Académico de Viseu	1–0	Oxford United	Alicante
	André Clóvis 8'	Report		Attendance: 0 (behind closed doors)

19 July 2024 Friendly	Oxford City	0–3	Oxford United	Oxford
19:30 BST		Report	Sibley 11'; Goodwin 25'; Brannagan 83'	Stadium: Court Place Farm; Attendance: 2,062

20 July 2024 Friendly	Solihull Moors	0–3	Oxford United	Solihull
13:00 BST		Report	Brannagan 17'; Goodrham 35'; Golding 90'	Stadium: Damson Park

24 July 2024 Friendly	Oxford United	0–1	Exeter City	Oxford
15:00 BST		Report	Magennis 19'	Stadium: Oxford Sports Park; Attendance: 0 (behind closed doors)

27 July 2024 Friendly	Mansfield Town	1–0	Oxford United	Mansfield
15:00 BST	Keillor-Dunn 58'	Report		Stadium: Field Mill; Attendance: 2,455

31 July 2024 Friendly	Oxford United	2–0	Southampton	Oxford
19:30 BST	Harris 35'; Rodrigues 43'	Report		Stadium: Kassam Stadium; Attendance: 5,273

3 August 2024 Friendly	Oxford United	0–2	Palermo	Oxford
15:00 BST		Report	Šarić 62'; Insigne 64'	Stadium: Kassam Stadium; Attendance: 3,539

== Competitions ==
=== Championship ===
==== League table ====
Pos	Team	Pld	W	D	L	GF	GA	GD	Pts
15	Queens Park Rangers	46	14	14	18	53	63	−10	56
16	Portsmouth	46	14	12	20	58	71	−13	54
17	Oxford United	46	13	14	19	49	65	−16	53
18	Stoke City	46	12	15	19	45	62	−17	51
19	Derby County	46	13	11	22	48	56	−8	50

Source: English Football League
Rules for classification: 1) Points; 2) Goal difference; 3) Number of goals scored; 4) Head-to-head results; 5) Wins; 6) Away goals; 7) Penalty points (sec 9.5); 8) Number of 12-point sending off offences; 9) Play-off (only if needed to determine promotion/relegation)

==== Results summary ====
Overall								Home						Away					
Pld	W	D	L	GF	GA	GD	Pts	W	D	L	GF	GA	GD	W	D	L	GF	GA	GD
46	13	14	19	49	65	−16	53	11	5	7	31	29	+2	2	9	12	18	36	−18

Last updated: complete.
Source: Soccerway

==== Results by round ====
Round	1	2	3	4	5	6	7	8	9	10	11	12	13	14	15	16	17	18	20	21	22	23	24	25	26	19^{1}	27	28	29	30	31	32	33	34	35	36	37	38	39	40	41	42	43	44	45	46
Ground	H	A	A	H	H	A	H	A	A	H	H	A	H	H	A	H	A	H	A	H	A	H	H	A	A	A	H	H	A	H	A	A	H	A	H	A	A	H	A	H	H	A	H	A	H	A
Result	W	L	L	W	W	L	D	D	D	D	D	L	L	W	L	L	L	D	L	L	L	W	W	W	D	D	W	W	D	D	L	D	L	L	L	D	L	W	L	W	L	W	L	D	W	D
Position	6	8	12	8	7	9	11	12	12	11	12	14	19	16	16	18	18	17	20	20	23	20	20	18	17	17	15	14	15	16	16	16	16	18	18	18	20	18	19	18	18	17	19	19	17	17
Points	3	3	3	6	9	9	10	11	12	13	14	14	14	17	17	17	17	18	18	18	18	21	24	27	28	29	32	35	36	37	37	38	38	38	38	39	39	42	42	45	45	48	48	49	52	53

Source: EFL
A = Away; H = Home; W = Win; D = Draw; L = Loss; P = Postponed
Notes:
- ^{1} Matchday 19 (vs. Plymouth Argyle) was postponed because of severe weather conditions.

==== Matches ====
On 26 June, the Championship fixtures were announced.

Win Draw Loss Fixtures

10 August 2024 1	Oxford United	2–0	Norwich City	Oxford
12:30 BST	Harris 28'; Brannagan 58'; Rodrigues (yellow card) 74'	Report	Sargent (yellow card) 45+1'; Forson (yellow card) 55'; Sørensen (yellow card) 87'	Stadium: Kassam Stadium; Attendance: 11,333; Referee: Andrew Kitchen

16 August 2024 2	Coventry City	3–2	Oxford United	Coventry
20:00 BST	Wright 15', 90+6'; Van Ewijk 31'	Report	Bennett (yellow card) 16'; Brown 22'; Harris 55'; Goodrham (yellow card) 59'	Stadium: Coventry Building Society Arena; Attendance: 28,051; Referee: David Coote
Note: Fixture was initially scheduled for 17 August, but was moved for live Sky Sports broadcast.

24 August 2024 3	Blackburn Rovers	2–1	Oxford United	Blackburn
15:00 BST	Tronstad (yellow card) 37'; Rankin-Costello 45+2'; Travis (yellow card) 77'; Sigurðsson 83'	Report	Harris 44'; Kioso (yellow card) 57'	Stadium: Ewood Park; Attendance: 14,769; Referee: Lewis Smith

31 August 2024 4	Oxford United	3–1	Preston North End	Oxford
15:00 BST	Harris 20'; Rodrigues (yellow card) 45+3'; Goodrham 54'; Leigh 71'	Report	Riis 3'; Greenwood (yellow card) 22'; Lindsay (yellow card) 52' (yellow-red card) 70'; Brady (yellow card) 76'; McCann (yellow card) 90+6'	Stadium: Kassam Stadium; Attendance: 11,403; Referee: Keith Stroud

14 September 2024 5	Oxford United	1–0	Stoke City	Oxford
15:00 BST	El Mizouni 48'	Report	Tchamadeu (yellow card) 79'	Stadium: Kassam Stadium; Attendance: 11,507; Referee: Dean Whitestone
Note: Fixture was initially scheduled for a 15:00 kick-off, but was moved for live Sky Sports broadcast.

21 September 2024 6	Bristol City	2–1	Oxford United	Ashton Gate
15:00 GMT	Williams (yellow card) 10'; Armstrong 57'; Wells 76' (pen.)	Report	El Mizouni (yellow card) 11'; Rodrigues 28'; Brown (yellow card) 53'; Moore (yellow card) 66'; Vaulks (yellow card) 74'	Stadium: Ashton Gate; Attendance: 28,125; Referee: Will Finnie

28 September 2024 7	Oxford United	0–0	Burnley	Oxford
15:00 BST	Goodrham (yellow card) 71'	Report	Lucas Pires (yellow card) 53'; Brownhill (yellow card) 70'	Stadium: Kassam Stadium; Attendance: 11,517; Referee: Robert Madley

1 October 2024 8	Luton Town	2–2	Oxford United	Luton
19:45 GMT	Clark 10'; Krauß 37'; Doughty (yellow card) 56'; Walsh (red card); Mpanzu (yellow card) 90+6'; Burke (yellow card) 90+7'	Report	Goodrham 45'; Kioso (yellow card) 48'; Rodrigues 54'; El Mizouni (yellow card) 68'; Moore (yellow card) 89'	Stadium: Kenilworth Road; Attendance: 11,397; Referee: James Bell

5 October 2024 9	Portsmouth	1–1	Oxford United	Portsmouth
12:30 GMT	O'Mahony 58'	Report	Kioso (yellow card) 67'; Sibley 72'	Stadium: Fratton Park; Attendance: 20,125; Referee: Lewis Smith
Note: Fixture was initially scheduled for a 15:00 kick-off, but was moved for live Sky Sports broadcast.

19 October 2024 10	Oxford United	1–1	West Bromwich Albion	Oxford
12:30 GMT	Nelson (yellow card) 63'; Sibley (yellow card) 75'; Scarlett 90+2'; Ebiowei (yellow card) 90+4'	Report	Grant 29'; Mowatt (yellow card) 66'	Stadium: Kassam Stadium; Attendance: 11,453; Referee: Leigh Doughty
Note: Fixture was initially scheduled for a 15:00 kick-off, but was moved for live Sky Sports broadcast.

22 October 2024 11	Oxford United	1–1	Derby County	Littlemore
19:45 BST	Scarlett 12'; Goodrham (yellow card) 19'	Report	Osborn (yellow card) 38'; Elder (yellow card) 45+1'; Blackett-Taylor (yellow card) 50'; Yates (yellow card) 52'; Mendez-Laing 55'; Cashin (yellow card) 76'	Stadium: Kassam Stadium; Attendance: 11,423; Referee: Gavin Ward

26 October 2024 12	Sunderland	2–0	Oxford United	Sunderland
15:00 BST	Bellingham 16'; Mepham (yellow card) 23'; Isidor (yellow card) 37', (goal) 63'	Report	Scarlett (yellow card) 51'; Sibley (yellow card) 77'	Stadium: Stadium of Light; Attendance: 40,654; Referee: Oliver Langford

2 November 2024 13	Oxford United	1–2	Swansea City	Oxford
12:30 GMT	Sibley (yellow card) 32'; Scarlett 88'	Report	Vipotnik 38'; Bianchini 80'; Tymon (yellow card) 84'	Stadium: Kassam Stadium; Attendance: 11,454; Referee: Michael Salisbury
Note: Fixture was initially scheduled for a 15:00 kick-off, but was moved for live Sky Sports broadcast.

5 November 2024 14	Oxford United	1–0	Hull City	Littlemore
19:45 GMT	Brown (yellow card) 50'; ter Avest 55'; Moore (yellow card) 58'	Report	Hughes (yellow card) 90'	Stadium: Kassam Stadium; Attendance: 10,213; Referee: Will Finnie

8 November 2024 15	Watford	1–0	Oxford United	Watford
20:00 GMT	Porteous (yellow card) 34'; Baah (yellow card) 38'; Bayo 54', (yellow card) 75'; Morris (yellow card) 90+3'		McEachran (yellow card) 45+1'; Moore (yellow card) 75'	Stadium: Vicarage Road
Note: Fixture was initially scheduled for 9 November, but was moved for live Sky Sports broadcast.

23 November 2024 16	Oxford United	2–6	Middlesbrough	Littlemore
15:00 GMT	Leigh 24'; Moore (yellow card) 35'; Scarlett 72'	Report	Azaz (yellow card) 27', (goal) 42', 83'; Latte Lath 37' (pen.), 45', 49'; Borges (yellow card) 60'; Conway 80'; Edmundson (yellow card) 90+3'	Stadium: Kassam Stadium; Attendance: 11,442; Referee: Josh Smith

26 November 2024 17	Sheffield United	3–0	Oxford United	Sheffield
19:45 GMT	O'Hare 10'; Campbell 26'; Rak-Sakyi 58'; Seriki (yellow card) 87'	Report	Goodrham (yellow card) 33'	Stadium: Bramall Lane; Attendance: 25,574; Referee: Leigh Doughty

30 November 2024 18	Oxford United	1–1	Millwall	Oxford
12:30 GMT	Goodrham 85'	Report	Tanganga (yellow card) 3', (goal) 45'; Leonard (yellow card) 59'; Bryan (yellow card) 64'; Saville (yellow card) 90+1'	Stadium: Kassam Stadium; Attendance: 10,990; Referee: Anthony Backhouse
Note: Fixture was initially scheduled for a 15:00 kick-off, but was moved for live Sky Sports broadcast.

11 December 2024 20	Queens Park Rangers	2–0	Oxford United	Shepherd's Bush
19:45 GMT	Field 53', 68'; Fox (yellow card) 90+1'; Lloyd (yellow card) 90+3'	Report	Brannagan (yellow card) 13'; Moore (yellow card) 27'	Stadium: Loftus Road; Attendance: 14,440; Referee: Adam Herczeg

14 December 2024 21	Oxford United	1–3	Sheffield Wednesday	Littlemore
15:00 GMT	Leigh 17'	Report	Windass 28'; Lowe 49'; Gassama 61', (yellow card) 72'	Stadium: Kassam Stadium; Attendance: 11,567; Referee: Stephen Martin

21 December 2024 22	Leeds United	4–0	Oxford United	Leeds
15:00 GMT	James 9'; Bogle 57'; Aaronson 67'; Solomon 73'	Report	Harris (yellow card) 27'	Stadium: Elland Road; Attendance: 36,646; Referee: James Bell

26 December 2024 23	Oxford United	3–2	Cardiff City	Littlemore
15:00 GMT	Harris 41'; Brown 53'; Placheta 57'; Dembélé (yellow card) 83'	Report	Robertson (yellow card) 80'; Ashford 82'; Robinson 90+5'	Stadium: Kassam Stadium; Attendance: 11,494; Referee: Gavin Ward

29 December 2024 24	Oxford United	2–0	Plymouth Argyle	Littlemore
15:00 GMT	Brown 14'; Płacheta 61'	Report	Sorinola (yellow card) 65'; Roberts (yellow card) 73'	Stadium: Kassam Stadium; Attendance: 11,438; Referee: David Webb

1 January 2025 25	Millwall	0–1	Oxford United	Bermondsey
13:00 GMT		Report	Rodrigues 57'; Brannagan (yellow card) 64'	Stadium: The Den; Attendance: 14,964; Referee: Ruebyn Ricardo
Note: Fixture was initially scheduled for a 15:00 kick-off, but was moved for live Sky Sports broadcast.

4 January 2025 26	Preston North End	1–1	Oxford United	Preston
15:00 GMT	Lindsay (yellow card) 20'; Storey (yellow card) 63'; Keane 69'; Whiteman (yellow card) 86'	Report	Rodrigues 21'; Long (yellow card) 32'; Cumming (yellow card) 60'; Dembélé (yellow card) 90+4'	Stadium: Deepdale; Attendance: 14,749; Referee: Ben Toner

14 January 2025 19	Plymouth Argyle	1–1	Oxford United	Plymouth
19:45 GMT	Al Hajj 63'; Gyabi (yellow card) 78'	Report	Vaulks 44'; Brown (yellow card) 61'	Stadium: Home Park; Attendance: 15,933; Referee: Sam Allison
Note: Fixture was originally scheduled for 7 December, but was postponed due to severe weather conditions.

18 January 2025 27	Oxford United	1–0	Blackburn Rovers	Oxford
15:00 GMT	Helik (yellow card) 21'; Brannagan 67'	Report	Gueye (yellow card) 33'; Cantwell (yellow card) 53'; Brittain (yellow card) 65'	Stadium: Kassam Stadium; Attendance: 11,207; Referee: Will Finnie

21 January 2025 28	Oxford United	3–2	Luton Town	Oxford
19:45 GMT	Phillips (yellow card) 10'; Helik 22'; Brown 59'; Leigh 69'; Brannagan (yellow card) 83'; Long (yellow card) 85'	Report	Krauß 11', (yellow card) 38'; Nelson (yellow card) 24'; McGuinness 26'; Jones (yellow card) 50'	Stadium: Kassam Stadium; Attendance: 11,035; Referee: Stephen Martin

25 January 2025 29	Stoke City	0–0	Oxford United	Stoke-on-Trent
12:30 GMT	Rose (yellow card) 46'; Stevens (yellow card) 76'; Lowe (yellow card) 90+1'	Report	Brannagan (yellow card) 34'; Bradshaw (yellow card) 39'; Kioso (yellow card) 81'; Matos (yellow card) 90'	Stadium: Bet365 Stadium; Attendance: 22,911; Referee: Farai Hallam

1 February 2025 30	Oxford United	1–1	Bristol City	Oxford
12:30 GMT	Leigh (yellow card) 19', (goal) 59'; Brannagan (yellow card) 30'; Helik (yellow card) 64'; Matos (yellow card) 84'	Report	McCrorie (yellow card) 4' (yellow-red card) 86'; Williams (red card) 31'; Sykes 65'; Bird (yellow card) 81'; O'Leary (yellow card) 90+4'	Stadium: Kassam Stadium; Attendance: 11,430; Referee: Oliver Langford

4 February 2025 31	Burnley	1–0	Oxford United	Burnley
19:45 GMT	Helik 33' (o.g.); Roberts (yellow card) 59'; Hannibal (yellow card) 64'	Report	Vaulks (yellow card) 43'; Brannagan (yellow card) 70'	Stadium: Turf Moor; Attendance: 18,187; Referee: James Bell
Note: Fixture was initially scheduled for 8 February, but was brought forward due to Burnley's FA Cup involvements.

11 February 2025 32	Derby County	0–0	Oxford United	Derby
19:45 GMT	Harness (yellow card) 90+1'	Report		Stadium: Pride Park Stadium; Attendance: 25,999; Referee: Stephen Martin

15 February 2025 33	Oxford United	0–2	Portsmouth	Oxford
12:30 GMT		Report	Dozzell (yellow card) 45+1', (goal) 47'; O'Mahony (yellow card) 87', (goal) 90+6'	Stadium: Kassam Stadium; Attendance: 11,423; Referee: Will Finnie

22 February 2025 34	West Bromwich Albion	2–0	Oxford United	West Bromwich
15:00 GMT	Mowatt 11', (yellow card) 45+1'; Styles (yellow card) 79'; Swift 90+11'	Report	Kioso (yellow card) 50'; Matos (yellow card) 58'; Brannagan (yellow card) 82'	Stadium: The Hawthorns; Attendance: 25,951; Referee: Sam Allison

1 March 2025 35	Oxford United	2–3	Coventry City	Oxford
12:30 GMT	Brannagan (yellow card) 41'; Brown (yellow card) 45+4'; Romeny 53', (yellow card) 57'; Moore 62'	Report	Rudoni 7'; Sakamoto (yellow card) 18', (goal) 71'; Mason-Clark 58'; Simms (penalty missed) 67'; Kitching (yellow card) 87'; Dovin (yellow card) 89'	Stadium: Kassam Stadium; Attendance: 11,405; Referee: Jeremy Simpson
Note: Fixture was initially scheduled for a 15:00 kick-off, but was moved for live Sky Sports broadcasting.

7 March 2025 36	Norwich City	1–1	Oxford United	Norwich
20:00 GMT	Sargent 5'	Report	Harris 18'; Moore (yellow card) 69'; Brown (yellow card) 72'	Stadium: Carrow Road; Attendance: 25,996; Referee: James Bell
Note: Fixture was initially scheduled for 8 March, but was moved for live Sky Sports broadcasting.

12 March 2025 37	Hull City	2–1	Oxford United	Kingston upon Hull
19:45 GMT	Gelhardt (yellow card) 45+1', (goal) 73'; Cumming 76' (o.g.); Hughes (yellow card) 80'; Puerta (yellow card) 82' (yellow-red card) 90+7'	Report	Brown (yellow card) 45+2'; Helik 66'	Stadium: MKM Stadium; Attendance: 19,024; Referee: Josh Smith

15 March 2025 38	Oxford United	1–0	Watford	Oxford
15:00 GMT	Płacheta (yellow card) 67'; Dembélé 82'	Report	Sierralta (yellow card) 51'; Abankwah (yellow card) 67' (yellow-red card) 79'	Stadium: Kassam Stadium; Attendance: 11,535; Referee: Bobby Madley

29 March 2025 39	Middlesbrough	2–1	Oxford United	Middlesbrough
15:00 GMT	Iheanacho 48'; Borges 80'	Report	Helik 38'; Harris (yellow card) 58'; Romeny (yellow card) 87'	Stadium: Riverside Stadium; Attendance: 24,624; Referee: Matthew Donohue

5 April 2025 40	Oxford United	1–0	Sheffield United	Oxford
15:00 BST	Dembélé 38'; ter Avest (yellow card) 52'; Płacheta (yellow card) 74'	Report	Ahmedhodžić (yellow card) 60'; Robinson (yellow card) 90+4'; Hamer (yellow card) 90+6'	Stadium: Kassam Stadium; Attendance: 11,496; Referee: James Linington

9 April 2025 41	Oxford United	1–3	Queens Park Rangers	Oxford
19:45 BST	Mills 62', (yellow card) 64'; Brannagan (yellow card) 87'	Report	Edwards 7'; Romeny 42' (o.g.); Andersen (yellow card) 85'; Nardi (yellow card) 89'; Yang Min-hyeok 90+1'; Colback (yellow card) 90+7'	Stadium: Kassam Stadium; Attendance: 11,509; Referee: Elliot Bell

12 April 2025 42	Sheffield Wednesday	0–1	Oxford United	Owlerton
15:00 BST	Windass (yellow card) 83'	Report	Harris (yellow card) 74'; Long 79'; Phillips (yellow card) 90+2'	Stadium: Hillsborough Stadium; Attendance: 25,646; Referee: Andy Davies

18 April 2025 43	Oxford United	0–1	Leeds United	Oxford
20:00 BST	Płacheta (yellow card) 42'; Vaulks (yellow card) 59'; Helik (yellow card) 61'; Mills (yellow card) 84'	Report	Solomon 33'; Gruev (yellow card) 62'; Bogle (yellow card) 90+2'	Stadium: Kassam Stadium; Attendance: 11,537; Referee: Dean Whitestone
Note: Fixture was initially scheduled for a 15:00 kick-off, but was moved for live Sky Sports broadcasting.

21 April 2025 44	Cardiff City	1–1	Oxford United	Leckwith
15:00 BST	Salech 56'; Mannsverk (yellow card) 79'	Sky report	Płacheta (yellow card) 40'; Helik (yellow card) 51'; Matos (yellow card) 59'; Brannagan 79'	Stadium: Cardiff City Stadium; Attendance: 23,407; Referee: Farai Hallam

26 April 2025 45	Oxford United	2–0	Sunderland	Oxford
15:00 BST	Goodrham (yellow card) 14'; Rodrigues (yellow card) 28'; Nelson 29'; Helik 48'; Vaulks (yellow card) 64'	Report	Mepham (yellow card) 42'	Stadium: Kassam Stadium; Attendance: 11,431; Referee: Tim Robinson

3 May 2025 46	Swansea City	3–3	Oxford United	Landore
12:30 BST	Eom Ji-sung 23'; Ronald 57'; Cullen 82'	Report	Leigh 40'; Matos (yellow card) 48'; Helik 62'; Płacheta 90+3'; Brannagan (yellow card) 90+5'	Stadium: Swansea.com Stadium; Attendance: 19,672; Referee: James Bell
Note: Fixture was initially scheduled for a 15:00 kick-off, but all EFL Championship final matchday fixtures were moved to an earlier kick-off.

=== FA Cup ===
Oxford United entered the FA Cup at the third round stage, and were drawn away to Exeter City.

Win Draw Loss Fixtures

11 January 2025 Third round	Exeter City	3–1	Oxford United	Exeter
15:00 GMT	Mitchell 22', 40'; Harper 64'; Richards (yellow card) 82'	Report	Phillips 14'; Scarlett (yellow card) 71'; Goodrham (red card) 81'; Sibley (yellow card) 85'; Ferdinan (yellow card) 90+5'	Stadium: St James Park; Attendance: 6,149; Referee: Scott Oldham

=== EFL Cup ===
On 27 June, the draw for the first round was made, with Oxford being drawn at home against Peterborough United. In the second round, they were drawn away to Coventry City.

Win Draw Loss Fixtures

13 August 2024 First round	Oxford United	2–0	Peterborough United	Oxford
19:45 BST	Goodrham 20' (yellow card) 33'; Phillips 41'	Report	Curtis (yellow card) 65'	Stadium: Kassam Stadium; Attendance: 3,693

27 August 2024 Second round	Coventry City	1–0	Oxford United	Coventry
19:45 BST	Thomas-Asante 57'	Report		Stadium: Coventry Building Society Arena; Attendance: 11,808; Referee: Will Finnie

== Statistics ==
=== Appearances and goals ===
Players with no appearances are not included on the list
Italics indicate a loaned in player

No.	Pos	Nat	Player	Total		Championship		FA Cup		EFL Cup	
No.	Pos	Nat	Player	Apps	Goals	Apps	Goals	Apps	Goals	Apps	Goals
1	GK	(England) ENG	Jamie Cumming	45	0	45+0	0	0+0	0	0+0	0
2	DF	(England) ENG	Sam Long	27	1	18+6	1	1+0	0	2+0	0
3	DF	(England) ENG	Ciaron Brown	41	4	40+0	4	0+0	0	1+0	0
4	MF	(Wales) WAL	Will Vaulks	46	1	38+6	1	0+0	0	0+2	0
5	DF	(England) ENG	Elliott Moore	27	1	24+2	1	0+0	0	0+1	0
6	MF	(England) ENG	Josh McEachran	15	0	6+6	0	1+0	0	2+0	0
7	FW	(Poland) POL	Przemysław Płacheta	33	3	27+5	3	0+1	0	0+0	0
8	MF	(England) ENG	Cameron Brannagan	35	3	33+0	3	0+0	0	1+1	0
9	FW	(Wales) WAL	Mark Harris	46	6	33+12	6	0+0	0	0+1	0
10	FW	(Scotland) SCO	Matt Phillips	31	2	11+18	0	1+0	1	1+0	1
11	FW	(Indonesia) IDN	Ole Romeny	14	1	7+7	1	0+0	0	0+0	0
12	DF	(England) ENG	Joe Bennett	12	0	8+4	0	0+0	0	0+0	0
14	MF	(England) ENG	Louie Sibley	14	1	1+10	1	1+0	0	2+0	0
15	MF	(Tunisia) TUN	Idris El Mizouni	31	1	12+16	1	1+0	0	1+1	0
16	DF	(England) ENG	Ben Nelson	17	1	16+1	1	0+0	0	0+0	0
17	FW	(England) ENG	Owen Dale	12	0	4+7	0	0+0	0	1+0	0
18	MF	(England) ENG	Alex Matos	21	0	10+10	0	0+1	0	0+0	0
19	FW	(Republic of Ireland) IRL	Tyler Goodrham	44	4	33+8	3	0+1	0	1+1	1
20	FW	(Portugal) POR	Rúben Rodrigues	41	4	28+11	4	0+0	0	1+1	0
21	GK	(England) ENG	Matt Ingram	4	0	1+0	0	1+0	0	2+0	0
22	DF	(Jamaica) JAM	Greg Leigh	37	6	24+10	6	1+0	0	2+0	0
23	FW	(Scotland) SCO	Siriki Dembélé	26	2	15+10	2	1+0	0	0+0	0
24	DF	(Netherlands) NED	Hidde ter Avest	22	1	10+11	1	1+0	0	0+0	0
25	FW	(England) ENG	Will Goodwin	3	0	0+3	0	0+0	0	0+0	0
28	MF	(Indonesia) IDN	Marselino Ferdinan	2	0	0+1	0	0+1	0	0+0	0
30	DF	(Republic of Ireland) IRL	Peter Kioso	33	0	26+4	0	0+1	0	2+0	0
34	DF	(England) ENG	Jordan Thorniley	4	0	0+2	0	1+0	0	1+0	0
39	FW	(England) ENG	Gatlin O'Donkor	2	0	0+1	0	0+0	0	0+1	0
44	FW	(England) ENG	Stanley Mills	11	1	3+8	1	0+0	0	0+0	0
47	DF	(Poland) POL	Michał Helik	20	5	20+0	5	0+0	0	0+0	0
50	FW	(Wales) WAL	Tom Bradshaw	11	0	4+7	0	0+0	0	0+0	0
Player(s) who featured whilst on loan but returned to parent club during the season:
11	FW	(England) ENG	Malcolm Ebiowei	6	0	0+4	0	0+0	0	1+1	0
44	FW	(England) ENG	Dane Scarlett	22	4	7+13	4	1+0	0	1+0	0
Player(s) who featured but departed the club permanently during the season:
29	FW	(England) ENG	Kyle Edwards	7	0	1+6	0	0+0	0	0+0	0
