= Joshua Johnson (footballer, born 2004) =

English footballer (born 2004)

Personal information
- Full name: Joshua Emmanuel Johnson
- Date of birth: 26 September 2004 (age 22)
- Place of birth: Westminster, England
- Position: Midfielder

Team information
- Current team: Maidenhead United
- Number: 8

Youth career
- –2020: Fulham
- 2021: Oxford United

Senior career*
Years	Team	Apps	(Gls)
2021–2026	Oxford United	0	(0)
2022	→ Dartford (loan)	5	(1)
2023	→ Dartford (loan)	1	(1)
2024	→ Welling United (loan)	3	(0)
2024	→ Banbury United (loan)	5	(0)
2024–2025	→ Maidenhead United (loan)	22	(1)
2026–	Maidenhead United	10	(0)
- * Club domestic league appearances and goals as of 20:35, 10 October 2026 (UTC)

Joshua Emmanuel Johnson (born 26 September 2004) is an English professional footballer who plays as a midfielder for Maidenhead United.

== Career ==
=== Oxford United ===
Johnson made his first-team debut for Oxford United at the age of sixteen, coming on as a 76th-minute substitute for Marcus McGuane in an EFL Cup first round tie at Burton Albion, and provided a pass to Anthony Forde that led to an Oxford goal. He played three further cup games in the 2021–22 campaign. On 23 August 2022, he started in a 2–0 defeat to Crystal Palace in an EFL Cup game at the Kassam Stadium; he said he enjoyed the match and thought the team supported him well. He signed his first professional two-year contract with the club the following month, describing it as a "dream come true". Manager Karl Robinson hailed him as a "terrific prospect". On 11 May 2026 Oxford said the player would leave in the summer when his contract expired. He made seven appearances in all competitions for Oxford.

==== Dartford (loans) ====
On 21 October, Johnson joined National League South club Dartford on a one-month loan.

On 6 October 2023, Johnson returned to Dartford for a second loan spell.

==== Welling United (loan) ====
On 22 January 2024, Johnson joined Welling United on loan, where he scored once in four appearances.

==== Banbury United (loan) ====
On 24 February 2024, Johnson joined Banbury United on loan, where he made five appearances.

==== Maidenhead United (loan) ====
On 7 August 2024, Johnson joined Maidenhead United on loan.

=== Maidenhead United ===
Johnson signed for Maidenhead United in June 2026.

== Style of play ==
Johnson is a midfielder who can play the holding role or further forward.

== Career statistics ==
As of 10 October 2026

Appearances and goals by club, season and competition
Club	Season	League			FA Cup		EFL Cup		Other		Total	
Club	Season	Division	Apps	Goals	Apps	Goals	Apps	Goals	Apps	Goals	Apps	Goals
Oxford United	2021–22	League One	0	0	0	0	2	0	2 (Note: Two appearances in the EFL Trophy)	0	4	0
Oxford United	2022–23	League One	0	0	1	0	1	0	0	0	2	0
Oxford United	2023–24	League One	0	0	0	0	0	0	1	0	1	0
Oxford United	2024–25	Championship	0	0	0	0	0	0	0	0	0	0
Oxford United	2025–26	Championship	0	0	0	0	0	0	0	0	0	0
Oxford United	Total		0	0	1	0	3	0	3	0	7	0
Dartford (loan)	2022–23	National League South	5	1	0	0	0	0	1 (Note: One appearance in the FA Trophy)	0	6	1
Dartford (loan)	2023–24	National League South	1	1	0	0	0	0	0	0	1	1
Welling United (loan)	2023–24	National League South	3	0	0	0	0	0	2 (Note: One appearance in the London Senior Cup, one appearance in the FA Trophy)	1	5	1
Banbury United (loan)	2023–24	National League North	5	0	0	0	0	0	0	0	5	0
Maidenhead United (loan)	2024–25	National League	22	1	0	0	0	0	1 (Note: Appearances in National League Cup)	0	23	1
Maidenhead United	2026–27	National League South	10	0	1	0	0	0	1 (Note: Appearances in Berks & Bucks Senior Cup)	1	12	1
Career total			46	3	2	0	3	0	8	2	59	5
