= Michael Elechi =

English footballer

Personal information
- Full name: Chickanele Michael Elechi
- Date of birth: 10 October 2001 (age 25)
- Place of birth: Westminster, England
- Height: 6 ft 1 in (1.85 m)
- Position: Defender

Team information
- Current team: Raynes Park Vale

Youth career
- 2016–2018: Manchester United
- 2018–2020: Oxford United

Senior career*
Years	Team	Apps	(Gls)
2020–2022	Oxford United	0	(0)
2020	→ Gosport Borough (loan)	4	(0)
2021	→ Oxford City (loan)	2	(0)
2021	→ Chippenham Town (loan)	3	(0)
2021–2022	→ Salisbury (loan)	4	(0)
2022–2024	Leatherhead	28	(1)
2024–2025	Lewes	2	(0)
2025–	Raynes Park Vale	4	(0)
- * Club domestic league appearances and goals as of 16:38, 7 March 2025 (UTC)

Chickanele Michael Elechi (born 10 October 2001) is an English professional footballer who plays as a defender for Isthmian League South Central Division club Raynes Park Vale.

== Career ==
Born in Westminster, Elechi started his youth career at Manchester United, joining their academy in 2016, but was released in 2018. He subsequently joined Oxford United and signed his first professional contract with them in December 2018, lasting until summer 2021.

On 1 February 2020, Elechi joined Southern League Premier Division South side Gosport Borough on a one-month loan deal. On 3 March 2020, the loan spell was extended by a further month.

He made his debut for Oxford United on 6 October 2020 in a 1–1 EFL Trophy draw with Bristol Rovers, in which Oxford won the resultant penalty shoot-out.

On 5 February 2021, Elechi joined National League South side Oxford City on a one-month loan, with an option to extend to the end of the season. He made 2 league appearances on loan at Oxford City, before the Coronavirus pandemic curtailed the season. On 9 September 2021, Elechi returned to the National League South, joining Chippenham Town on an initial one-month loan. In November of the same year he was loaned to Southern League Premier Division South side Salisbury for a month. On 14 December 2021, his loan spell at Salisbury was extended by a further month. Elechi was released by Oxford at the end of the 2021–22 season.

On 21 October 2022, Elechi signed for Isthmian League South Central Division club Leatherhead.

In February 2025, following a short spell with Lewes, Elechi joined Raynes Park Vale.

== Personal life ==
Born in England, Elechi is of Nigerian descent.
