= 2021–22 Oxford United F.C. season =

English football club season

Oxford United
2021–22 season
- Chairman: Sumrith Thanakarnjanasuth
- Manager: Karl Robinson
- Stadium: Kassam Stadium
- League One: 8th
- FA Cup: First round
- EFL Cup: Second round
- EFL Trophy: Group stage
- Top goalscorer: League: Matty Taylor (20); All: Matty Taylor (22)
Home colours

The 2021–22 season is Oxford United's 128th year in their history and sixth consecutive season in League One. Along with the league, the club will also compete in the FA Cup, the EFL Cup and the EFL Trophy. The season covers the period from 1 July 2021 to 30 June 2022.

== Transfers ==
=== Transfers in ===
| Date | Position | Nationality | Name | From | Fee | Ref. |
|---|---|---|---|---|---|---|
| 1 July 2021 | LW | (Wales) | Billy Bodin | (England) Preston North End | Free transfer | |
| 1 July 2021 | CM | (England) | Marcus McGuane | (England) Nottingham Forest | Undisclosed | |
| 1 July 2021 | RM | (Australia) | Ryan Williams | (England) Portsmouth | Free transfer | |
| 1 July 2021 | CB | (Albania) | Erion Zabeli | (England) Watford | Free transfer | |
| 22 July 2021 | LB | (England) | Steve Seddon | (England) Birmingham City | Undisclosed | |
| 27 August 2021 | GK | (England) | Mackenzie Chapman | (England) Oldham Athletic | Free transfer | |
| 31 August 2021 | CM | (Thailand) | Ben Davis | (England) Fulham | Undisclosed | |
| 31 January 2022 | AM | (England) | Marcus Browne | (England) Middlesbrough | Undisclosed | |
| 31 January 2022 | AM | (Northern Ireland) | Oisin Smyth | (Northern Ireland) Dungannon Swifts | Undisclosed | |
| 4 February 2022 | CF | (England) | Sam Baldock | (England) Derby County | Free transfer | |

=== Loans in ===
| Date from | Position | Nationality | Name | From | Date until | Ref. |
|---|---|---|---|---|---|---|
| 29 July 2021 | LW | (England) | Nathan Holland | (England) West Ham United | End of season | |
| 31 July 2021 | RW | (Northern Ireland) | Gavin Whyte | (Wales) Cardiff City | End of season | |
| 1 August 2021 | CB | (England) | Jordan Thorniley | (England) Blackpool | 24 January 2022 (Note: On 24 January, Thorniley was recalled by Blackpool.) | |
| 30 August 2021 | CM | (England) | Herbie Kane | (England) Barnsley | End of season | |
| 23 November 2021 | GK | (England) | Connal Trueman | (England) Birmingham City | 30 November 2021 | |
| 31 January 2022 | CB | (Northern Ireland) | Ciaron Brown | (Wales) Cardiff City | End of season | |

=== Loans out ===
| Date from | Position | Nationality | Name | To | Date until | Ref. |
|---|---|---|---|---|---|---|
| 6 September 2021 | MF | (England) | Tyler Goodrham | (England) Hayes & Yeading United | November 2021 | |
| 7 September 2021 | LB | (England) | Michael Elechi | (England) Chippenham Town | November 2021 | |
| 16 September 2021 | CB | (England) | Benjamin Watt | (England) Stratford Town | | |
| 1 October 2021 | CM | (England) | Leon Chambers-Parillon | (England) Gloucester City | November 2021 | |
| 5 October 2021 | MF | (England) | Adam Smith | (England) Weston-super-Mare | November 2021 | |
| 26 October 2021 | GK | (England) | Mackenzie Chapman | (England) Banbury United | November 2021 | |
| 3 November 2021 | CM | (England) | Leon Chambers-Parillon | (England) Havant & Waterlooville | | |
| 12 November 2021 | LB | (England) | Michael Elechi | (England) Salisbury | December 2021 | |
| 5 December 2021 | GK | (England) | Mackenzie Chapman | (England) St Ives Town | January 2022 | |
| 16 December 2021 | MF | (England) | Tyler Goodrham | (England) Slough Town | 26 February 2022 (Note: On 27 January, Goodrham's loan at Slough was extended by a further month.) | |
| 16 December 2021 | CB | (England) | Benjamin Watt | (England) St Ives Town | January 2022 | |
| 11 January 2022 | DF | (Republic of Ireland) | James Golding | (England) Banbury United | February 2022 | |
| 27 January 2022 | LM | (Northern Ireland) | Joel Cooper | (England) Port Vale | End of season | |
| 5 March 2022 | CF | (England) | Gatlin O'Donkor | (England) Oxford City | Work experience | |
| 5 March 2022 | GK | (England) | Kie Plumley | (England) Faversham Town | | |

=== Transfers out ===
| Date | Position | Nationality | Name | To | Fee | Ref. |
|---|---|---|---|---|---|---|
| 30 June 2021 | CF | (England) | Dylan Asonganyi | (England) Maidenhead United | Released | |
| 30 June 2021 | RW | (England) | Robert Hall | (England) Barnet | Released | |
| 30 June 2021 | CB | (Republic of Ireland) | Nico Jones | (England) Brentford | Released | |
| 30 June 2021 | CF | (Portugal) | Fábio Lopes | | Released | |
| 30 June 2021 | LB | (England) | Josh Ruffels | (England) Huddersfield Town | Free transfer | |
| 30 June 2021 | MF | (England) | Fabio Sole | | Released | |
| 1 July 2021 | CF | (England) | Callum Crook | (England) North Leigh | Free transfer | |
| 3 July 2021 | CB | (England) | Robert Atkinson | (England) Bristol City | Undisclosed | |
| 6 July 2021 | RM | (England) | Kyran Lofthouse | (England) Woking | Undisclosed | |
| 20 July 2021 | CM | (England) | Sean Clare | (England) Charlton Athletic | Undisclosed | |
| 1 September 2021 | CF | (France) | Derick Osei | (England) AFC Wimbledon | Mutual consent | |
| 1 September 2021 | FW | (Wales) | Jack Stevens | (England) Hayes & Yeading United | Free transfer | |
| 28 January 2022 | CF | (England) | Dan Agyei | (England) Crewe Alexandra | Undisclosed | |

== Pre-season friendlies ==
Oxford United announced they would play friendlies against Oxford City, Hayes & Yeading United, Banbury United, a double header against Peterborough United and Bristol Rovers as part of their pre-season preparations. A planned fixture against Birmingham City was called off following an outbreak of COVID-19 among the Oxford squad.

| 16 July 2021 Friendly | Oxford City | 2–3 | Oxford United | Marston |
| 19:00 BST | Coyle 84', 89' | Report | Agyei 18'; Taylor 55'; Rodríguez 90' | Stadium: Court Place Farm |

| 17 July 2021 Friendly | Oxford United | 6–1 | Salford City | Horspath |
| 14:00 BST | Taylor ?', 77'; O'Donkor 92', ?', ?'; Smith ?' | Report | 12' | Stadium: Oxford Sports Park; Attendance: 0 (behind-closed-doors) |

| 20 July 2021 Friendly | Hayes & Yeading United | 0–9 | Oxford United | Thame |
| 19:30 BST | | Report | Taylor 12', 29', 34', 52'; Elechi 17'; Goodrham 57'; Cooper 69', ?'; Osei 73' | Stadium: The ASM Stadium |

| 21 July 2021 Friendly | Banbury United | 0–3 | Oxford United | Banbury |
| 19:45 BST | | Report | O'Donkor 47'; Osei 54' (pen.); Goodrham 63' | Stadium: Spencer Stadium |

| 28 July 2021 Friendly | Oxford United | 2–2 | Peterborough United | Horspath |
| 13:00 BST | Forde 30'; Agyei 31' | Report | Kanu ?', ?' | Stadium: Oxford Sports Park; Attendance: 0 (Behind-closed-doors) |

| 28 July 2021 Friendly | Oxford United | 2–2 | Peterborough United | Horspath |
| 13:00 BST | Sykes 30' (pen.); Trialist | Report | Burrows ?'; Hamilton ?' (pen.) | Stadium: Oxford Sports Park; Attendance: 0 (Behind-closed-doors) |

| 31 July 2021 Friendly | Bristol Rovers | 3–2 | Oxford United | Horfield |
| 13:00 BST | Thomas 45+2' (pen.); Pitman 83', 88' | Report | Seddon 16'; Henry 48' | Stadium: Memorial Stadium |

| 3 August 2021 Friendly | Oxford United | 1–1 | Barnet | Horspath |
| BST | Whyte ?' | Report | | Stadium: Oxford Sports Park; Attendance: 0 (Behind-closed-doors) |

== Competitions ==
=== League One ===
==== League table ====
| Pos | Team | Pld | W | D | L | GF | GA | GD | Pts | Promotion, qualification or relegation |
|---|---|---|---|---|---|---|---|---|---|---|
| 4 | Sheffield Wednesday | 46 | 24 | 13 | 9 | 78 | 50 | +28 | 85 | Qualification for League One play-offs |
| 5 | Sunderland (O, P) | 46 | 24 | 12 | 10 | 79 | 53 | +26 | 84 | Qualification for League One play-offs |
| 6 | Wycombe Wanderers | 46 | 23 | 14 | 9 | 75 | 51 | +24 | 83 | Qualification for League One play-offs |
| 7 | Plymouth Argyle | 46 | 23 | 11 | 12 | 68 | 48 | +20 | 80 | |
| 8 | Oxford United | 46 | 22 | 10 | 14 | 82 | 59 | +23 | 76 | |
| 9 | Bolton Wanderers | 46 | 21 | 10 | 15 | 74 | 57 | +17 | 73 | |
| 10 | Portsmouth | 46 | 20 | 13 | 13 | 68 | 51 | +17 | 73 | |
| 11 | Ipswich Town | 46 | 18 | 16 | 12 | 67 | 46 | +21 | 70 | |
| 12 | Accrington Stanley | 46 | 17 | 10 | 19 | 61 | 80 | −19 | 61 | |

Source: EFL Official Website
Rules for classification: 1) Points; 2) Goal difference; 3) Number of goals scored; 4) Head-to-head results; 5) Wins; 6) Away goals; 7) Penalty points based on yellow and red cards received excluding the last four games of the season (sec 9.5); 8) 12-point sending off offences; 9) If the tie affects the automatic promotion or relegation places, a play-off game or games would be held between the two tied teams
(O) Play-off winners; (P) Promoted

==== Results summary ====
| Overall | | | | | | | | Home | | | | | | Away | | | | | |
| Pld | W | D | L | GF | GA | GD | Pts | W | D | L | GF | GA | GD | W | D | L | GF | GA | GD |
|---|---|---|---|---|---|---|---|---|---|---|---|---|---|---|---|---|---|---|---|
| 46 | 22 | 10 | 14 | 82 | 59 | +23 | 76 | 13 | 6 | 4 | 47 | 27 | +20 | 9 | 4 | 10 | 35 | 32 | +3 |

Last updated: 30 April 2022.

==== Results by matchday ====
| Matchday | 1 | 2 | 3 | 4 | 5 | 6 | 7 | 8 | 9 | 10 | 11 | 12 | 13 | 14 | 15 | 16 | 17 | 18 | 19 | 20 | 21 | 22 | 23 | 24 | 25 | 26 | 27 | 28 | 29 | 30 | 31 | 32 | 33 | 34 | 35 | 36 | 37 | 38 | 39 | 40 | 41 | 42 | 43 | 44 | 45 | 46 |
|---|---|---|---|---|---|---|---|---|---|---|---|---|---|---|---|---|---|---|---|---|---|---|---|---|---|---|---|---|---|---|---|---|---|---|---|---|---|---|---|---|---|---|---|---|---|---|
| Ground | A | H | H | A | H | A | H | A | H | H | A | H | H | A | H | A | H | H | A | A | A | H | H | H | A | A | H | A | A | H | A | H | A | A | H | A | H | A | H | A | A | H | A | H | A | H |
| Result | D | W | W | L | W | L | D | L | D | W | W | L | W | W | W | D | W | D | D | W | W | L | W | D | L | L | W | W | D | W | L | L | W | W | W | L | W | W | D | L | L | L | W | W | L | D |
| Position | 16 | 9 | 5 | 10 | 3 | 7 | 10 | 14 | 13 | 8 | 8 | 9 | 8 | 6 | 6 | 6 | 7 | 8 | 7 | 5 | 5 | 6 | 5 | 5 | 5 | 7 | 6 | 6 | 6 | 5 | 5 | 7 | 4 | 4 | 4 | 4 | 4 | 4 | 5 | 7 | 8 | 8 | 8 | 8 | 8 | 8 |

Updated to match(es) played on 30 April 2022. Source: Statto.com
A = Away; H = Home; W = Win; D = Draw; L = Loss

==== Matches ====
Oxford United's fixtures were announced on 24 June 2021.

| 7 August 2021 1 | Cambridge United | 1–1 | Oxford United | Cambridge |
| 15:00 BST | O'Neil (yellow card) 31'; Ironside 78' (pen.) | Report | Williams (yellow card) 30'; Seddon 42', (yellow card) 88' | Stadium: Abbey Stadium; Attendance: 6,444 (1,428 away); Referee: David Rock |

| 14 August 2021 2 | Oxford United | 2–1 | Charlton Athletic | Oxford |
| 15:00 BST | Williams 23'; Brannagan 31'; Rodríguez (yellow card) 37'; Taylor (yellow card) 89' | Report | Washington 36' (pen.); Stockley (yellow card) 67'; Famewo (yellow card) 87' | Stadium: Kassam Stadium; Attendance: 8,440 (1,373 away); Referee: Thomas Bramall |

| 17 August 2021 3 | Oxford United | 1–0 | Crewe Alexandra | Oxford |
| 19:45 BST | Henry 33' (pen.), (yellow card) 90+1'; Rodríguez (yellow card) 51' | Report | Offord (yellow card) 79'; Lundstram (yellow card) 82'; Griffiths (yellow card) 90+5' | Stadium: Kassam Stadium; Attendance: 6,757 (204 away); Referee: Bobby Madley |

| 21 August 2021 4 | Bolton Wanderers | 2–1 | Oxford United | Horwich |
| 15:00 BST | Afolayan 45'; Doyle 63' | Report | Taylor 11', (yellow card) 39'; McGuane (yellow card) 85'; Forde (yellow card) 90+2' | Stadium: University of Bolton Stadium; Attendance: 15,073 (804 away); Referee: Neil Hair |

| 28 August 2021 5 | Oxford United | 3–1 | Lincoln City | Oxford |
| 15:00 BST | Henry 12', 24', 73' (pen.) | Report | Bridcutt (yellow card) 64'; Scully 87' (pen.) | Stadium: Kassam Stadium; Attendance: 7,045 (576 away); Referee: Will Finnie |

| 4 September 2021 6 | AFC Wimbledon | 3–1 | Oxford United | Wimbledon |
| 15:00 BST | Guinness-Walker (yellow card) 37'; Heneghan (yellow card) 54'; Rudoni 55', 81'; Nightingale 78'; Chislett (yellow card) 79' | Report | Seddon (yellow card) 13'; Sykes 45+1' | Stadium: Plough Lane; Referee: Brett Huxtable |

| 11 September 2021 7 | Oxford United | 0–0 | Wycombe Wanderers | Oxford |
| 15:00 BST | Taylor (yellow card) 87'; Stevens (yellow card) 89'; Brannagan (yellow card) 90+7'; Rodríguez (yellow card) 90+9' | Report | Thompson (yellow card) 90+7' | Stadium: Kassam Stadium; Attendance: 9,082 (1,505 away); Referee: Martin Coy |

| 18 September 2021 8 | Cheltenham Town | 1–0 | Oxford United | Cheltenham |
| 15:00 BST | Thomas (yellow card) 65'; May 68'; Blair (yellow card) 88' | Report | Long (yellow card) 90+4' | Stadium: Jonny-Rocks Stadium; Attendance: 5,004 (1,452 away); Referee: Paul Howard |

| 25 September 2021 9 | Oxford United | 1–1 | Gillingham | Oxford |
| 15:00 BST | Taylor 5' | Report | MacDonald 30'; Tucker (yellow card) 44'; Cumming (yellow card) 85' | Stadium: Kassam Stadium; Attendance: 6,664 (362 away); Referee: Darren Drysdale |

| 28 September 2021 10 | Oxford United | 5–1 | Accrington Stanley | Oxford |
| 19:45 BST | Holland 18', 24'; Taylor 50'; Seddon (yellow card) 56'; Sykes 71'; Kane (yellow card) 79'; Moore (yellow card) 81'; Williams (yellow card) 90'; Nottingham 90+4' (o.g.) | Report | Sykes (yellow card) 45+3'; Hamilton 61'; McConville (yellow card) 81' | Stadium: Kassam Stadium; Attendance: 5,654 (81 away); Referee: Robert Lewis |

| 2 October 2021 11 | Sheffield Wednesday | 1–2 | Oxford United | Owlerton |
| 15:00 BST | Paterson (yellow card) 61', (goal) 73'; Palmer (yellow card) 85' | Report | Brannagan 12'; Seddon (yellow card) 61'; Rodríguez (yellow card) 80'; Henry 90+3' | Stadium: Hillsborough; Attendance: 22,060; Referee: Andy Haines |

| 16 October 2021 12 | Oxford United | 1–3 | Plymouth Argyle | Oxford |
| 15:00 BST | Taylor 5' | Report | Garrick 11'; Scarr (yellow card) 31'; Camará 39', 84' | Stadium: Kassam Stadium; Attendance: 8,877 (1,784 away); Referee: James Bell |

| 19 October 2021 13 | Oxford United | 2–0 | Shrewsbury Town | Oxford |
| 19:45 GMT | Sykes 46'; Brannagan 87' | Report | | Stadium: Kassam Stadium; Attendance: 5,763 (221 away); Referee: Craig Hicks |

| 23 October 2021 14 | Burton Albion | 1–3 | Oxford United | Burton upon Trent |
| 15:00 BST | Bostwick (yellow card) 38'; Akins (yellow card) 53'; Lakin 80'; Hemmings (yellow card) 86' | Report | Taylor 1'; Bostwick 43' (o.g.); Brannagan (yellow card) 68'; Henry 84' (pen.) | Stadium: Pirelli Stadium; Attendance: 3,391; Referee: Sam Barrott |

| 30 October 2021 15 | Oxford United | 3–1 | Morecambe | Oxford |
| 15:00 BST | Seddon 29'; Henry (penalty missed) 52'; Sykes 73'; Taylor 87' | Report | Andrésson (yellow card) 51'; Stockton 64' | Stadium: Kassam Stadium; Attendance: 8,766 (228 away); Referee: Lee Swabey |

| 13 November 2021 16 | Ipswich Town | 0–0 | Oxford United | Ipswich |
| 15:00 GMT | Morsy (yellow card) 80'; Clements (yellow card) 90+1' | Report | Brannagan (yellow card) 40' | Stadium: Portman Road; Attendance: 21,322 (922 away); Referee: Scott Oldham |

| 23 November 2021 17 | Oxford United | 3–1 | Fleetwood Town | Oxford |
| 19:45 GMT | McNally 5'; Brannagan 13'; Holland 69'; Whyte (yellow card) 89' | Report | Matete 40' (yellow card) 84'; Clark (yellow card) 52'; Batty (yellow card) 65' | Stadium: Kassam Stadium; Attendance: 5,708 (59 away); Referee: Ollie Yates |

| 27 November 2021 18 | Oxford United | 0–0 | Rotherham United | Oxford |
| 15:00 GMT | Seddon (yellow card) 68' | Report | Barlaser (yellow card) 37'; Miller (yellow card) 48'; Rathbone (yellow card) 64'; Wiles (yellow card) 69'; Harding (yellow card) 90+1' | Stadium: Kassam Stadium; Attendance: 7,620 (1,001 away); Referee: Sam Purkiss |

| 4 December 2021 19 | Sunderland | 1–1 | Oxford United | Sunderland |
| 15:00 GMT | Dajaku 7'; Wright (yellow card) 13'; Wright (yellow card) 13'; Neil (yellow card) 40' | Report | Brannagan (yellow card) 5'; Taylor (yellow card) 13', (goal) 36' | Stadium: Stadium of Light; Attendance: 26,634; Referee: Jeremy Simpson |

| 7 December 2021 20 | Doncaster | 1–2 | Oxford United | Doncaster |
| 19:45 GMT | Jones (yellow card) 23'; Smith (yellow card) 69'; Horton 74'; Rowe (yellow card) 76' | Report | Sykes 16'; Henry 87' | Stadium: Keepmoat Stadium; Attendance: 5,785 (424 away); Referee: James Oldham |

| 11 December 2021 21 | Milton Keynes Dons | 1–2 | Oxford United | Denbigh |
| 15:00 GMT | Boateng 11'; McEachran (yellow card) 90+2' | Report | Henry (yellow card) 42'; Taylor 65'; Thorniley (yellow card) 70' (yellow-red card) 90+7'; Sykes 79', (yellow card) 80'; Long (yellow card) 90+2' | Stadium: Stadium MK; Attendance: 9,914 (2,192 away); Referee: Tom Reeves |

| 18 December 2021 22 | Oxford United | 2–3 | Wigan Athletic | Oxford |
| 15:00 GMT | Williams 33'; Taylor (yellow card) 36', (goal) 59'; McGuane (yellow card) 90+1' | Report | Keane 8'; Darikwa (yellow card) 30'; Power 32', (yellow card) 36'; Naylor (yellow card) 44'; Whatmough (yellow card) 72'; McClean 86', (yellow card) 90' | Stadium: Kassam Stadium; Attendance: 8,354 (942 away); Referee: James Bell |

| 29 December 2021 23 | Oxford United | 3–0 | AFC Wimbledon | Oxford |
| 19:45 GMT | Sykes 27'; Taylor 38'; Kane (yellow card) 43'; Long 60'; Moore (yellow card) 76' | Report | Csóka (yellow card) 62'; Woodyard (yellow card) 72'; Marsh (yellow card) 75' | Stadium: Kassam Stadium; Attendance: 7,915 (780 away); Referee: Trevor Kettle |

| 1 January 2022 24 | Oxford United | 1–1 | Cheltenham Town | Oxford |
| 15:00 GMT | Taylor (penalty missed) 29'; Sykes (yellow card) 32', (goal) 82' | Report | Thomas (yellow card) 45'; Wright 48'; Blair (yellow card) 58'; Freestone (yellow card) 71'; Evans (yellow card) 72'; Raglan (yellow card) 77' | Stadium: Kassam Stadium; Attendance: 8,251 (508 away); Referee: Carl Brook |

| 8 January 2022 25 | Lincoln City | 2–0 | Oxford United | Lincoln |
| 15:00 GMT | Scully 40'; Whittaker 56' | Report | Kane (red card) 77' | Stadium: LNER Stadium; Attendance: 8,053 (748 away); Referee: Seb Stockbridge |

| 15 January 2022 26 | Wycombe Wanderers | 2–0 | Oxford United | High Wycombe |
| 15:00 GMT | Thompson 33'; Hanlan (yellow card) 52', (goal) 60'; McCleary (yellow card) 64' | Report | Sykes (yellow card) 77'; Brannagan (yellow card) 90+1' | Stadium: Adams Park; Attendance: 8,005 (1,808 away); Referee: Anthony Backhouse |

| 22 January 2022 27 | Oxford United | 3–2 | Sheffield Wednesday | Oxford |
| 15:00 GMT | Taylor 45+1', (yellow card) 45+4', (goal) 62'; Winnall 84' | Report | Bannan 7', (yellow card) 80'; Hunt (yellow card) 14'; Windass 60' | Stadium: Kassam Stadium; Attendance: 10,071 (1,444 away); Referee: Alan Young |

| 29 January 2022 28 | Gillingham | 2–7 | Oxford United | Gillingham |
| 15:00 GMT | Lee (yellow card) 11'; Carayol (yellow card) 18'; Dahlberg (yellow card) 47'; Lloyd 62'; McKenzie 85' | Report | Bodin 8'; Brannagan 12' (pen.), 48' (pen.), 55' (pen.), 83' (pen.); Taylor 19'; Forde 89' | Stadium: Priestfield; Attendance: 4,985 (650 away); Referee: Bobby Madley |

| 1 February 2022 29 | Wigan Athletic | 1–1 | Oxford United | Wigan |
| 19:45 GMT | Lang 36' (yellow card) 65'; Shinnie (yellow card) 49' | Report | Taylor 23'; Moore (yellow card) 34'; Kane (yellow card) 45+2'; Brannagan (yellow card) 65'; McNally (yellow card) 69' | Stadium: DW Stadium; Attendance: 9,958 (571 away); Referee: Andrew Kitchen |

| 5 February 2022 30 | Oxford United | 3–2 | Portsmouth | Oxford |
| 15:00 GMT | McNally 6'; Brannagan (yellow card) 64', (goal) 82'; Seddon (yellow card) 77'; Kane (yellow card) 80'; Moore (yellow card) 90+4'; Holland 90+6' | Report | Jacobs 10', (yellow card) 24'; Morrell (red card) 16'; Hirst (yellow card) 28'; Hume (yellow card) 45+4'; Curtis 51', (yellow card) 81'; Bazunu (yellow card) 88'; Tunnicliffe (yellow card) 90+2'; Raggett (yellow card) 90+11' | Stadium: Kassam Stadium; Attendance: 10,373 (1,754 away); Referee: Sam Barrott |

| 8 February 2022 31 | Accrington Stanley | 2–0 | Oxford United | Accrington |
| 19:45 GMT | O'Sullivan 28'; Leigh (yellow card) 47'; Hamilton 90+1' | Report | Williams (yellow card) 49'; Brannagan (yellow card) 75' | Stadium: Wham Stadium; Attendance: 1,883 (307 away); Referee: Martin Coy |

| 12 February 2022 32 | Oxford United | 2–3 | Bolton Wanderers | Oxford |
| 15:00 GMT | Bodin 9', 32'; Moore (yellow card) 26'; Kane (yellow card) 70'; Seddon (yellow card) 75' | Report | John 10'; Fossey 38'; Afolayan (yellow card) 74'; Bakayoko 86' | Stadium: Kassam Stadium; Attendance: 10,027 (1,750 away); Referee: Gavin Ward |

| 19 February 2022 33 | Charlton Athletic | 0–4 | Oxford United | Charlton |
| 15:00 GMT | Leko (yellow card) 10'; Jaiyesimi (yellow card) 23'; Purrington (yellow card) 24'; Clare (red card) 62'; Inniss (yellow card) 63'; Morgan (yellow card) 77'; Famewo (yellow card) 82' | Report | Taylor 21', 28', (yellow card) 63'; Moore (yellow card) 29'; Sykes (yellow card) 53'; Baldock 54'; Brown (yellow card) 72'; Brannagan 83' | Stadium: The Valley; Attendance: 14,029 (1,987 away); Referee: Carl Boyeson |

| 22 February 2022 34 | Crewe Alexandra | 0–1 | Oxford United | Crewe |
| 19:45 GMT | Offord (yellow card) 57'; Lowery (yellow card) 63' | Report | Taylor (yellow card) 48'; Kane (yellow card) 59'; Brown 65' | Stadium: Mornflake Stadium; Attendance: 3,968 (648 away); Referee: Scott Oldham |

| 26 February 2022 35 | Oxford United | 4–2 | Cambridge United | Oxford |
| 15:00 GMT | Brannagan (yellow card) 9', (goal) 64', 90'; Taylor 36'; Whyte (yellow card) 45+1'; Baldock 72' | Report | Smith 6', 56'; Brophy (yellow card) 10'; Dunk (yellow card) 21'; O'Neil (yellow card) 90+2' | Stadium: Kassam Stadium; Attendance: 10,004 (646 away); Referee: Charles Breakspear |

| 1 March 2022 36 | Portsmouth | 3–2 | Oxford United | Milton |
| 19:45 GMT | Raggett 42'; Hirst 45+2'; Carter 58', (yellow card) 74' | Report | Browne 3'; McNally 81'; Long (yellow card) 86' | Stadium: Fratton Park; Attendance: 15,113 (1,370 away); Referee: Sam Allison |

| 5 March 2022 37 | Oxford United | 4–1 | Burton Albion | Oxford |
| 15:00 GMT | Baldock 7', 40'; Whyte 35'; Taylor 45' | Report | Saydee (yellow card) 29'; Guedioura 45+2' | Stadium: Kassam Stadium; Attendance: 7,631 (217 away); Referee: Sam Purkiss |

| 12 March 2022 38 | Shrewsbury Town | 1–2 | Oxford United | Shrewsbury |
| 15:00 GMT | Bowman 60'; Pennington (yellow card) 82' | Report | Taylor 11'; Brannagan 82' (pen.) | Stadium: Montgomery Waters Meadow; Attendance: 7,302 (1,231 away); Referee: Andy Davies |

| 19 March 2022 39 | Oxford United | 1–1 | Ipswich Town | Oxford |
| 15:00 GMT | Williams (yellow card) 90+2'; McNally 90+5'; Sykes (yellow card) 90+6' | Report | Burns (yellow card) 56'; Celina 70'; Bonne (yellow card) 90+4' | Stadium: Kassam Stadium; Attendance: 11,029 (1,787 away); Referee: Marc Edwards |

| 2 April 2022 40 | Plymouth Argyle | 1–0 | Oxford United | Plymouth |
| 15:00 BST | Edwards 56'; Cooper (yellow card) 90+4' | Report | Brown (yellow card) 45+1'; Bodin (yellow card) 76'; Taylor (yellow card) 82' | Stadium: Home Park; Attendance: 15,826 (1,485 away); Referee: Ollie Yates |

| 5 April 2022 41 | Morecambe | 2–1 | Oxford United | Morecambe |
| 19:45 BST | Wildig 14'; Stockton 25'; McLaughlin (yellow card) 42'; Fané (yellow card) 47' | Report | Taylor 3'; Williams (yellow card) 44' | Stadium: The Mazuma Stadium; Attendance: 3,882 (304 away); Referee: Robert Lewis |

| 9 April 2022 42 | Oxford United | 1–2 | Sunderland | Oxford |
| 15:00 BST | Moore 35' | Report | Evans 16'; Matete (yellow card) 73'; Cirkin (yellow card) 81'; Embleton 89' | Stadium: Kassam Stadium; Attendance: 11,690 (1,782 away); Referee: Ben Toner |

| 15 April 2022 43 | Fleetwood Town | 2–3 | Oxford United | Fleetwood |
| 15:00 BST | Harrison 39' (pen.), (yellow card) 52'; Hayes 53' | Report | Holland 2'; Brannagan 7', (yellow card) 71'; Bodin 16'; Stevens (yellow card) 90+6' | Stadium: Highbury Stadium; Attendance: 2,589 (739 away); Referee: Bobby Madley |

| 19 April 2022 44 | Oxford United | 1–0 | Milton Keynes Dons | Oxford |
| 19:45 BST | McNally (yellow card) 43'; Bodin 86'; Taylor (yellow card) 90+1'; Brannagan (yellow card) 90+5' | Report | | Stadium: Kassam Stadium; Attendance: 9,685 (1,608 away); Referee: Anthony Backhouse |

| 23 April 2022 45 | Rotherham United | 2–1 | Oxford United | Rotherham |
| 15:00 BST | Harding (yellow card) 29'; Edmonds-Green 45+3'; Barlaser 66' (pen.). (yellow card) 72'; Osei-Tutu (yellow card) 83' | Report | Barlaser 10' (o.g.); Williams (yellow card) 20'; Taylor (yellow card) 44' | Stadium: AESSEAL New York Stadium; Attendance: 10,415; Referee: Charles Breakspear |

| 30 April 2022 46 | Oxford United | 1–1 | Doncaster Rovers | Littlemore |
| 12:30 BST | Bodin 23' | Report | Jackson (yellow card) 55'; Martin 67' | Stadium: The Kassam Stadium; Attendance: 9,139; Referee: Trevor Kettle |

=== FA Cup ===
Oxford were drawn at home to Bristol Rovers in the first round.

| 7 November 2021 First round | Oxford United | 2–2 | Bristol Rovers | Oxford |
| 13:00 GMT | Taylor 11', (yellow card) 32'; McGuane 51' | Report | Finley (yellow card) 33', (goal) 45+2'; Coutts (yellow card) 45'; Evans 87' (pen.) | Stadium: Kassam Stadium; Attendance: 5,083 (797 away); Referee: Paul Howard |

| 16 November 2021 First round replay | Bristol Rovers | 4–3 (a.e.t.) | Oxford United | Horfield, Bristol |
| 19:00 GMT | Finley 48'; Evans (yellow card) 50'; Spence (yellow card) 105', (goal) 110', 118'; Collins 115' | Report | Kane (yellow card) 4'; Bodin (yellow card) 38', (goal) 91'; Taylor 57' (pen.); Seddon 93' | Stadium: Memorial Stadium; Attendance: 4,918 (684 away); Referee: Neil Hair |

=== EFL Cup ===
Oxford United were drawn away to Burton Albion in the first round and Queens Park Rangers in the second round.

| 11 August 2021 First round | Burton Albion | 1–1 (2–4 p) | Oxford United | Burton upon Trent |
| 19:45 BST | Mousinho 90+6' (o.g.) | Report | Bodin (yellow card) 76'; Holland 85' | Stadium: Pirelli Stadium; Attendance: 1,868 (429 away); Referee: Seb Stockbridge |
| | Penalties |
| | Akins (penalty missed); Shaughnessy (penalty scored); O'Connor (penalty missed); Blake-Tracy (penalty scored) | | Sykes (penalty scored); Forde (penalty scored); Agyei (penalty scored); Mousinho (penalty scored) |

| 24 August 2021 Second round | Queens Park Rangers | 2–0 | Oxford United | White City |
| 19:45 BST | Dickie 26'; Chambers-Parillon 40' (o.g.); Chair (yellow card) 66' | Report | Sykes (yellow card) 59'; Johnson (yellow card) 76' | Stadium: Kiyan Prince Foundation Stadium; Attendance: 8,154 (2058 away); Referee: Tom Nield |

=== EFL Trophy ===
The U's were drawn into Southern Group H alongside Cambridge United, Stevenage and Tottenham Hotspur U21s. On 7 July, the fixtures for the group stage round was revealed.

| Pos | Div | Team | Pld | W | PW | PL | L | GF | GA | GD | Pts | Qualification |
|---|---|---|---|---|---|---|---|---|---|---|---|---|
| 1 | L1 | Cambridge United | 3 | 2 | 0 | 0 | 1 | 5 | 2 | +3 | 6 | Advance to Round 2 |
| 2 | L2 | Stevenage | 3 | 2 | 0 | 0 | 1 | 6 | 5 | +1 | 6 | Advance to Round 2 |
| 3 | ACA | Tottenham Hotspur U21 | 3 | 1 | 0 | 0 | 2 | 6 | 7 | −1 | 3 | |
| 4 | L1 | Oxford United | 3 | 1 | 0 | 0 | 2 | 5 | 8 | −3 | 3 | |

Source: EFL.com

| 31 August 2021 Group game 1 | Cambridge United | 4–1 | Oxford United | Cambridge |
| 19:00 BST | Smith 45' 45+3'; May (yellow card) 63'; Knibbs 80'; Yearn (yellow card) 90+2' | Report | Cooper (yellow card) 42'; McNally (red card) 45+1'; Johnson (yellow card) 53'; Agyei 71' | Stadium: Abbey Stadium; Attendance: 1,390 (133 away); Referee: Sam Allison |

| 5 October 2021 Group game 2 | Oxford United | 1–2 | Stevenage | Oxford |
| 19:45 BST | Agyei 11'; Henry (yellow card) 62' | Report | Reid 75'; Norris 90' | Stadium: Kassam Stadium; Attendance: 1,712; Referee: Ben Toner |

| 26 October 2021 Group game 3 | Oxford United | 3–2 | Tottenham Hotspur U21 | Oxford |
| 19:45 BST | Cooper 2', 28'; Rodríguez (yellow card) 16', (goal) 65'; McNally (yellow card) 23' (yellow-red card) 73' | Report | Scarlett 24' (pen.); Clarke 90' | Stadium: Kassam Stadium; Attendance: 1,702; Referee: Christopher Pollard |

=== Appearances and goals ===
As of 19 April 2022

| No. | Pos | Nat | Player | Total | | League One | | FA Cup | | League Cup | | FL Trophy | |
| No. | Pos | Nat | Player | Apps | Goals | Apps | Goals | Apps | Goals | Apps | Goals | Apps | Goals |
|---|---|---|---|---|---|---|---|---|---|---|---|---|---|
| 1 | GK | (England) ENG | Simon Eastwood | 21 | 0 | 14 | 0 | 2 | 0 | 2 | 0 | 3 | 0 |
| 2 | DF | (England) ENG | Sam Long | 35 | 1 | 31+1 | 1 | 1+1 | 0 | 0 | 0 | 0+1 | 0 |
| 4 | DF | (England) ENG | Jordan Thorniley | 25 | 0 | 21 | 0 | 2 | 0 | 1 | 0 | 1 | 0 |
| 5 | DF | (England) ENG | Elliott Moore | 34 | 1 | 31 | 1 | 1 | 0 | 1 | 0 | 1 | 0 |
| 6 | MF | (Spain) ESP | Alex Gorrin | 17 | 1 | 11+2 | 0 | 1 | 0 | 2 | 0 | 1 | 1 |
| 7 | MF | (Australia) AUS | Ryan Williams | 34 | 2 | 21+10 | 2 | 1+1 | 0 | 0 | 0 | 1 | 0 |
| 8 | MF | (England) ENG | Cameron Brannagan | 41 | 14 | 38 | 14 | 1 | 0 | 0+1 | 0 | 1 | 0 |
| 9 | FW | (England) ENG | Matty Taylor | 44 | 22 | 41+1 | 20 | 1+1 | 2 | 0 | 0 | 0 | 0 |
| 10 | MF | (Republic of Ireland) IRL | Mark Sykes | 44 | 8 | 35+4 | 8 | 2 | 0 | 2 | 0 | 1 | 0 |
| 11 | FW | (England) ENG | Sam Winnall | 21 | 1 | 1+18 | 1 | 0 | 0 | 2 | 0 | 0 | 0 |
| 12 | FW | (England) ENG | Marcus Browne | 3 | 1 | 1+2 | 1 | 0 | 0 | 0 | 0 | 0 | 0 |
| 13 | GK | (England) ENG | Jack Stevens | 28 | 0 | 28 | 0 | 0 | 0 | 0 | 0 | 0 | 0 |
| 14 | MF | (Republic of Ireland) IRL | Anthony Forde | 16 | 1 | 9+3 | 1 | 1+1 | 0 | 1 | 0 | 1 | 0 |
| 15 | DF | (England) ENG | John Mousinho | 10 | 0 | 1+5 | 0 | 1 | 0 | 0+1 | 0 | 2 | 0 |
| 16 | DF | (Republic of Ireland) IRL | Luke McNally | 31 | 4 | 24+2 | 4 | 1 | 0 | 2 | 0 | 2 | 0 |
| 17 | MF | (England) ENG | James Henry | 26 | 7 | 16+8 | 7 | 0+1 | 0 | 0 | 0 | 1 | 0 |
| 18 | MF | (England) ENG | Marcus McGuane | 31 | 1 | 11+15 | 0 | 2 | 1 | 2 | 0 | 1 | 0 |
| 19 | FW | (England) ENG | Dan Agyei | 20 | 2 | 0+13 | 0 | 1+1 | 0 | 2 | 0 | 3 | 2 |
| 19 | FW | (England) ENG | Sam Baldock | 7 | 4 | 4+3 | 4 | 0 | 0 | 0 | 0 | 0 | 0 |
| 20 | DF | (England) ENG | Jamie Hanson | 3 | 0 | 1 | 0 | 0+1 | 0 | 0 | 0 | 1 | 0 |
| 21 | FW | (Northern Ireland) NIR | Gavin Whyte | 36 | 1 | 26+8 | 1 | 1 | 0 | 0+1 | 0 | 0 | 0 |
| 22 | FW | (Northern Ireland) NIR | Joel Cooper | 4 | 2 | 0+1 | 0 | 0 | 0 | 0 | 0 | 3 | 2 |
| 23 | FW | (Wales) WAL | Billy Bodin | 22 | 6 | 12+7 | 5 | 1 | 1 | 1 | 0 | 1 | 0 |
| 24 | DF | (Northern Ireland) NIR | Ciaron Brown | 12 | 1 | 10+2 | 1 | 0 | 0 | 0 | 0 | 0 | 0 |
| 26 | FW | (England) ENG | Herbie Kane | 36 | 0 | 32+1 | 0 | 1+1 | 0 | 0 | 0 | 1 | 0 |
| 27 | FW | (England) ENG | Nathan Holland | 37 | 6 | 20+13 | 5 | 0 | 0 | 1+1 | 1 | 1+1 | 0 |
| 28 | GK | (England) ENG | Connal Trueman | 2 | 0 | 2 | 0 | 0 | 0 | 0 | 0 | 0 | 0 |
| 29 | DF | (Thailand) THA | Ben Davis | 1 | 0 | 0 | 0 | 0 | 0 | 0 | 0 | 0+1 | 0 |
| 33 | DF | (England) ENG | Michael Elechi | 1 | 0 | 0 | 0 | 0 | 0 | 0 | 0 | 0+1 | 0 |
| 37 | MF | (England) ENG | Tyler Goodrham | 1 | 0 | 0 | 0 | 0 | 0 | 0 | 0 | 1 | 0 |
| 38 | MF | (England) ENG | Leon Chambers-Parillon | 3 | 0 | 0 | 0 | 0 | 0 | 2 | 0 | 1 | 0 |
| 42 | FW | (England) ENG | Steve Seddon | 38 | 3 | 33+1 | 2 | 1+1 | 1 | 1 | 0 | 1 | 0 |
| 43 | DF | (Republic of Ireland) IRL | James Golding | 1 | 0 | 0 | 0 | 0 | 0 | 0 | 0 | 0+1 | 0 |
| 46 | MF | (England) ENG | Josh Anifowose | 1 | 0 | 0 | 0 | 0 | 0 | 0 | 0 | 0+1 | 0 |
| 45 | DF | (England) ENG | Clinton Nosakhare | 2 | 0 | 0 | 0 | 0 | 0 | 0 | 0 | 0+2 | 0 |
| 49 | FW | (England) ENG | Gatlin O'Donkor | 2 | 0 | 0 | 0 | 0 | 0 | 0 | 0 | 0+2 | 0 |
| 51 | MF | (England) ENG | Josh Johnson | 4 | 0 | 0 | 0 | 0 | 0 | 0+2 | 0 | 2 | 0 |

== Top scorers ==
As of 19 April 2022

| Place | Position | Nation | Number | Name | League One | FA Cup | League Cup | FL Trophy | Total |
|---|---|---|---|---|---|---|---|---|---|
| 1 | FW | (England) | 9 | Matty Taylor | 20 | 2 | 0 | 0 | 22 |
| 2 | MF | (England) | 8 | Cameron Brannagan | 14 | 0 | 0 | 0 | 14 |
| 3 | MF | (Republic of Ireland) | 10 | Mark Sykes | 8 | 0 | 0 | 0 | 8 |
| 4 | MF | (England) | 17 | James Henry | 7 | 0 | 0 | 0 | 7 |
| 5= | MF | (England) | 23 | Billy Bodin | 5 | 1 | 0 | 0 | 6 |
| 5= | FW | (England) | 27 | Nathan Holland | 5 | 0 | 1 | 0 | 6 |
| 7= | FW | (England) | 19 | Sam Baldock | 4 | 0 | 0 | 0 | 4 |
| 7= | DF | (Republic of Ireland) | 18 | Luke McNally | 4 | 0 | 0 | 0 | 4 |
| 9 | DF | (England) | 42 | Steve Seddon | 2 | 1 | 0 | 0 | 3 |
| 10= | MF | (Australia) | 7 | Ryan Williams | 2 | 0 | 0 | 0 | 2 |
| 10= | FW | (England) | 19 | Dan Agyei | 0 | 0 | 0 | 2 | 2 |
| 10= | FW | (Northern Ireland) | 22 | Joel Cooper | 0 | 0 | 0 | 2 | 2 |
| 10= | Own goal | | | | 2 | 0 | 0 | 0 | 2 |
| 14= | DF | (England) | 2 | Sam Long | 1 | 0 | 0 | 0 | 1 |
| 14= | DF | (Northern Ireland) | 4 | Ciaron Brown | 1 | 0 | 0 | 0 | 1 |
| 14= | DF | (England) | 5 | Elliott Moore | 1 | 0 | 0 | 0 | 1 |
| 14= | MF | (Spain) | 6 | Alex Gorrin | 0 | 0 | 0 | 1 | 1 |
| 14= | FW | (England) | 12 | Marcus Browne | 1 | 0 | 0 | 0 | 1 |
| 14= | MF | (Republic of Ireland) | 14 | Anthony Forde | 1 | 0 | 0 | 0 | 1 |
| 14= | MF | (England) | 11 | Sam Winnall | 1 | 0 | 0 | 0 | 1 |
| 14= | MF | (England) | 18 | Marcus McGuane | 0 | 1 | 0 | 0 | 1 |
| 14= | FW | (Northern Ireland) | 21 | Gavin Whyte | 1 | 0 | 0 | 0 | 1 |
| TOTALS | | | | | 80 | 5 | 1 | 5 | 91 |

=== Disciplinary record ===
As of 19 April 2022

| Number | Nation | Position | Name | League One | | FA Cup | | League Cup | | FL Trophy | | Total | |
| Number | Nation | Position | Name | Booked | Sent off (straight red) | Booked | Sent off (straight red) | Booked | Sent off (straight red) | Booked | Sent off (straight red) | Booked | Sent off (straight red) |
| 2 | (England) | DF | Sam Long | 3 | 0 | 0 | 0 | 0 | 0 | 0 | 0 | 3 | 0 |
| 4 | (England) | DF | Jordan Thorniley | 1 | 0 | 0 | 0 | 0 | 0 | 0 | 0 | 1 | 0 |
| 4 | (Northern Ireland) | DF | Ciaron Brown | 2 | 0 | 0 | 0 | 0 | 0 | 0 | 0 | 2 | 0 |
| 5 | (England) | DF | Elliott Moore | 6 | 0 | 0 | 0 | 0 | 0 | 0 | 0 | 6 | 0 |
| 6 | (Spain) | MF | Alex Gorrin | 4 | 0 | 0 | 0 | 0 | 0 | 1 | 0 | 5 | 0 |
| 7 | (Australia) | MF | Ryan Williams | 5 | 0 | 0 | 0 | 0 | 0 | 0 | 0 | 5 | 0 |
| 8 | (England) | MF | Cameron Brannagan | 9 | 0 | 0 | 0 | 0 | 0 | 0 | 0 | 9 | 0 |
| 9 | (England) | FW | Matty Taylor | 9 | 0 | 1 | 0 | 0 | 0 | 0 | 0 | 10 | 0 |
| 10 | (Republic of Ireland) | MF | Mark Sykes | 5 | 0 | 0 | 0 | 1 | 0 | 0 | 0 | 6 | 0 |
| 13 | (Republic of Ireland) | GK | Jack Stevens | 2 | 0 | 0 | 0 | 1 | 0 | 0 | 0 | 2 | 0 |
| 14 | (Republic of Ireland) | MF | Anthony Forde | 1 | 0 | 0 | 0 | 0 | 0 | 0 | 0 | 1 | 0 |
| 16 | (Republic of Ireland) | MF | Luke McNally | 2 | 0 | 0 | 0 | 0 | 0 | 2 | 2 | 4 | 2 |
| 17 | (England) | MF | James Henry | 2 | 0 | 0 | 0 | 0 | 0 | 1 | 0 | 3 | 0 |
| 18 | (England) | MF | Marcus McGuane | 2 | 0 | 0 | 0 | 0 | 0 | 0 | 0 | 2 | 0 |
| 21 | (Northern Ireland) | FW | Gavin Whyte | 2 | 0 | 0 | 0 | 0 | 0 | 0 | 0 | 2 | 0 |
| 22 | (Northern Ireland) | FW | Joel Cooper | 0 | 0 | 0 | 0 | 1 | 0 | 0 | 0 | 1 | 0 |
| 23 | (Wales) | FW | Billy Bodin | 1 | 0 | 1 | 0 | 1 | 0 | 0 | 0 | 3 | 0 |
| 26 | (England) | MF | Herbie Kane | 6 | 1 | 1 | 0 | 0 | 0 | 0 | 0 | 7 | 1 |
| 42 | (England) | DF | Steve Seddon | 6 | 0 | 0 | 0 | 0 | 0 | 0 | 0 | 6 | 0 |
| 51 | (England) | MF | Josh Johnson | 0 | 0 | 0 | 0 | 1 | 0 | 1 | 0 | 2 | 0 |
| TOTALS | | | | 65 | 1 | 3 | 0 | 3 | 0 | 5 | 2 | 79 | 3 |

== See also ==
- 2021–22 EFL League One
