= James Golding (footballer) =

English footballer (born 2004)

Personal information
- Full name: James Anthony Golding
- Date of birth: 10 August 2004 (age 22)
- Place of birth: Sutton, England
- Height: 6 ft 2 in (1.88 m)
- Position: Centre back

Team information
- Current team: Oxford United
- Number: 35

Youth career
- 2012–2020: AFC Wimbledon
- 2020–2022: Oxford United

Senior career*
Years	Team	Apps	(Gls)
2021–	Oxford United	3	(0)
2022	→ Banbury United (loan)	11	(2)
2023	→ Banbury United (loan)	3	(0)
2023	→ Dartford (loan)	9	(1)
2023	→ Maidenhead United (loan)	10	(0)
2024	→ Maidenhead United (loan)	7	(2)
2024–2025	→ Southend United (loan)	14	(3)
2025–2026	→ Crewe Alexandra (loan)	12	(0)
2026–	→ Southend United (loan)	16	(2)

International career
2022–2023	Republic of Ireland U19	4	(0)
- * Club domestic league appearances and goals as of 20:14, 28 April 2026 (UTC)

James Anthony Golding (born 10 August 2004) is a professional footballer who plays as a defender for EFL League One club Oxford United.

== Club career ==
=== Oxford United ===
On 26 October 2021, Golding made his professional debut, coming on as a substitute for Jamie Hanson in the 78th minute in a 3–2 win against Tottenham Hotspur Academy in the EFL Trophy.

On 11 January 2022, Golding joined Banbury United on an initial month long loan, with the loan later being extended to the end of the season.

On 23 March, Golding signed his first professional contract with United. On 30 April, the final game of the 2021–22 season, Golding was given his first League One start in a 1–1 draw against Doncaster Rovers.

On 11 August 2023, Golding joined Dartford on a one-month loan. He then joined Maidenhead United on loan on 26 September.

On 5 September 2024, Golding returned to Maidenhead United on loan until January 2025. On 6 December 2024, he joined fellow National League side Southend United on a short-term loan deal.

On 11 August 2025, Golding joined League Two club Crewe Alexandra on a season-long loan, making his debut the following day in Crewe's 3–1 first round EFL Cup defeat at Stockport County. Injured in a 2–1 defeat at Cambridge United on 29 November 2025, Golding was recalled by Oxford on 3 January 2026.

== International career ==
Golding received his first call up to the Republic of Ireland U19 squad on 30 May 2022, ahead of two friendlies against Iceland U19 in Spain. He made his debut on 1 June, coming on in the 77th minute in a 3–0 win.

== Personal life ==
Golding is the brother of fellow professional footballer Michael Golding and scholar Aidan Golding.

== Career statistics ==
As of match played 29 November 2025

Appearances and goals by club, season and competition
Club	Season	League			FA Cup		EFL Cup		Other		Total	
Club	Season	Division	Apps	Goals	Apps	Goals	Apps	Goals	Apps	Goals	Apps	Goals
Oxford United	2021–22	League One	1	0	0	0	0	0	1 (Note: Appearance in EFL Trophy)	0	2	0
Oxford United	2022–23	League One	2	0	0	0	2	0	2	0	6	0
Oxford United	2023–24	League One	0	0	0	0	0	0	1	0	1	0
Oxford United	2024–25	Championship	0	0	0	0	0	0	–		0	0
Oxford United	2025–26	Championship	0	0	0	0	0	0	–		0	0
Oxford United	Total		3	0	0	0	2	0	4	0	9	0
Banbury United (loan)	2021–22	SFL Premier Division Central	14	2	—		—		1 (Note: Appearance in Southern League Cup)	0	15	2
Dartford (loan)	2023–24	National League South	9	1	1	0	–		0	0	10	1
Maidenhead United (loan)	2023–24	National League	10	0	0	0	–		1 (Note: Appearance in Berks & Bucks Senior Cup)	0	11	0
Maidenhead United (loan)	2024–25	National League	7	2	3	0	–		0	0	10	2
Southend United (loan)	2024–25	National League	14	3	0	0	–		1 (Note: Appearance in FA Trophy)	0	15	3
Crewe Alexandra (loan)	2025–26	League Two	12	0	0	0	1	0	2	0	15	0
Career total			69	8	4	0	3	0	9	0	85	8

== Honours ==
Southend United

- FA Trophy: 2025–26
