= Nathan Holland =

English footballer (born 1998)

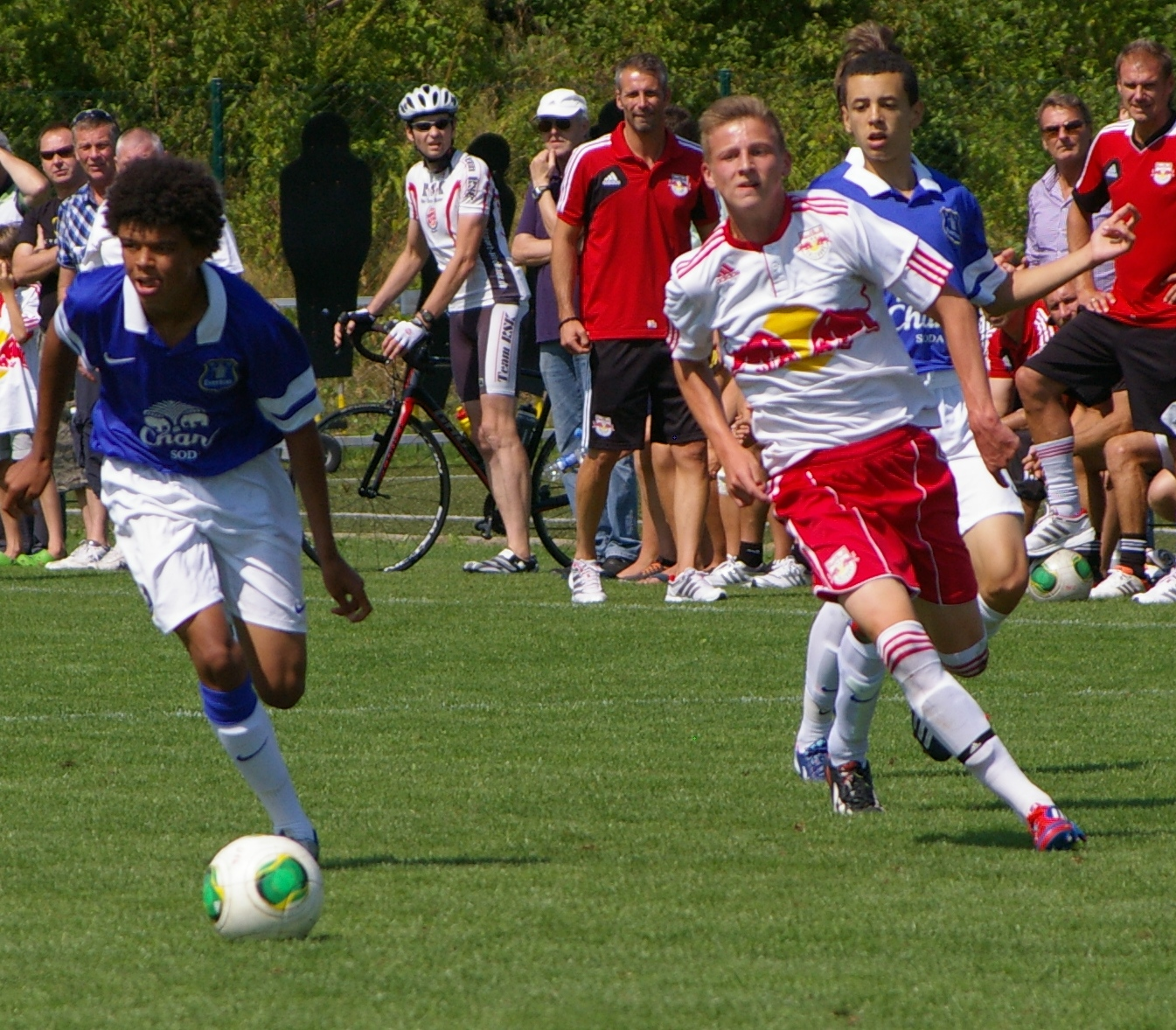
- Holland (right) playing for Everton in 2013.

Personal information
- Full name: Nathan Elliot Holland
- Date of birth: 19 June 1998 (age 28)
- Place of birth: Wythenshawe, England
- Height: 5 ft 10 in (1.78 m)
- Position: Midfielder

Youth career
- 2007–2016: Everton

Senior career*
Years	Team	Apps	(Gls)
2016–2017	Everton	0	(0)
2017–2022	West Ham United	2	(0)
2020	→ Oxford United (loan)	10	(2)
2021–2022	→ Oxford United (loan)	35	(5)
2022–2023	Milton Keynes Dons	29	(1)
2023–2024	Forest Green Rovers	3	(0)

International career
2014	England U16	4	(0)
2014–2015	England U17	15	(2)
2015–2016	England U18	5	(0)
2016	England U19	2	(0)
- * Club domestic league appearances and goals as of 13:59, 30 April 2024 (UTC)

Nathan Elliot Holland (born 19 June 1998) is an English professional footballer. He last played as a midfielder for National League club Forest Green Rovers.

He previously played for Everton, West Ham United and Milton Keynes Dons and had two loan spells with Oxford United.

== Club career ==
=== Everton ===
Holland joined the academy of Premier League club Everton at the age of nine. He progressed through several age groups and signed his first professional contract in January 2016.

=== West Ham United ===
On 22 January 2017, Holland joined West Ham United, signing a three-and-a-half-year deal. He made his first team debut on 19 September 2017 in a 3–0 EFL Cup third round home win over Bolton Wanderers, coming on as a 61st-minute substitute. Holland went on to feature regularly for the club's U23 side in both Premier League 2 and the EFL Trophy, and in May 2019 signed a new three-year contract keeping him at West Ham until 2022. On 4 December 2019, he made his Premier League debut as a 71st-minute substitute in a 2–0 defeat away to Wolverhampton Wanderers.

On 8 January 2020, Holland joined EFL League One club Oxford United on loan for the remainder of the 2019–20 season. He scored his first senior professional goal on 4 February 2020 in a 3–2 FA Cup fourth round defeat at home to Newcastle United. Holland's loan spell was cut short in March 2020 after sustaining a hamstring injury which ruled him out for the remainder of the season. In July 2021, he returned to Oxford United for a second loan spell ahead of the 2021–22 season. Following his return to West Ham at the conclusion of the season, Holland was one of several players released by the club.

=== Milton Keynes Dons ===
On 22 June 2022, Holland joined League One club Milton Keynes Dons on a permanent deal following his release from West Ham. He made his debut on 30 July 2022 in a 1–0 defeat away to Cambridge United. Holland went on to make 35 appearances in all competitions in his debut season, scoring 2 goals.

=== Forest Green Rovers ===
On 24 August 2023, Holland joined League Two club Forest Green Rovers for an undisclosed fee.

Following relegation at the end of the 2023–24 season, Holland was released.

He was subsequently drafted into the Baller League.

== International career ==
As well as England, Holland is eligible to represent Barbados. He made 26 appearances for England at U16 to U19 level, including 15 appearances and 2 goals for the U17 side.

== Honours ==
Individual

- West Ham United Young Player of the Year: 2019–20

== Career statistics ==
As of end of 2023–24 season

Appearances and goals by club, season and competition
Club	Season	League			National Cup		League Cup		Other		Total	
Club	Season	Division	Apps	Goals	Apps	Goals	Apps	Goals	Apps	Goals	Apps	Goals
West Ham United U21	2017–18	—							2 (Note: Appearances in the EFL Trophy)	0	2	0
West Ham United	2017–18	Premier League	0	0	0	0	1	0	—		1	0
West Ham United	2018–19	Premier League	0	0	0	0	0	0	—		0	0
West Ham United	2019–20	Premier League	2	0	0	0	1	0	—		3	0
West Ham United	2020–21	Premier League	0	0	0	0	0	0	—		0	0
West Ham United	2021–22	Premier League	0	0	0	0	0	0	0	0	0	0
West Ham United	Total		2	0	0	0	2	0	0	0	4	0
Oxford United (loan)	2019–20	League One	10	2	2	1	—		—		12	3
Oxford United (loan)	2021–22	League One	35	5	0	0	2	1	2	0	39	6
Oxford United (loan)	Total		45	7	2	1	2	1	2	0	51	9
Milton Keynes Dons	2022–23	League One	28	1	2	0	2	0	3	1	35	2
Milton Keynes Dons	2023–24	League Two	1	0	—		1	0	0	0	2	0
Milton Keynes Dons	Total		29	1	2	0	3	0	3	1	37	2
Forest Green Rovers	2023–24	League Two	4	0	0	0	—		2	0	6	0
Career total			80	8	4	1	7	1	9	1	100	11
