= Ciaron Brown =

Northern Ireland international footballer (born 1998_

Personal information
- Full name: Ciaron Maurice Brown
- Date of birth: 14 January 1998 (age 28)
- Place of birth: Hillingdon, London, England
- Height: 6 ft 1 in (1.85 m)
- Position: Defender

Team information
- Current team: Oxford United
- Number: 3

Senior career*
Years	Team	Apps	(Gls)
2015–2016	Bedfont Sports	34	(2)
2016–2018	Wealdstone	46	(2)
2018–2022	Cardiff City	17	(0)
2019	→ Livingston (loan)	5	(0)
2020–2021	→ Livingston (loan)	25	(1)
2022	→ Oxford United (loan)	13	(1)
2022–	Oxford United	178	(15)

International career^{‡}
2019–2020	Northern Ireland U21	4	(0)
2019–	Northern Ireland	36	(2)
- * Club domestic league appearances and goals as of 28 October 2026 (UTC) ‡ National team caps and goals as of 18 November 2026

Ciaron Maurice Brown (born 14 January 1998) is a professional footballer who plays as a defender for EFL League One club Oxford United. Born in England, he plays for the Northern Ireland national team.

== Club career ==
=== Early career ===
Brown enjoyed a stint at amateur side Bedfont Sports before moving to National League South club Wealdstone. He made over 50 appearances for the Ruislip-based club, scoring twice.

=== Cardiff City ===
After a successful trial period, Brown was signed by Cardiff City on 9 January 2018. He was an unused substitute in Cardiff's 3–1 defeat to Norwich City in the EFL Cup.

On 24 January 2019, Livingston confirmed the signing of Brown on loan from Cardiff. He played his first league game on 23 February 2019, playing 63 minutes against Kilmarnock. He was again loaned to Livingston in January 2020. On 21 July 2020, he rejoined Livingston on a one-year loan, making his third spell at the club. On 31 January 2021, Brown was recalled following an impressive string of displays.

On 31 January 2022, Brown joined EFL League One club Oxford United on loan until the end of the 2021–22 season. On June 10, 2022, Cardiff announced Brown would leave the club when his contract expired on June 30.

=== Oxford United ===
On 26 June 2022, Brown signed for Oxford United on a two-year deal. On 17 October 2023, Brown signed a contract extension of undisclosed length. His contract was again renewed in June 2025.

In January 2023, The Football Association opened an investigation into suspicious betting patterns related to the booking of Brown in Oxford's FA Cup defeat against Arsenal on 9 January 2023. The investigation was closed in May 2023 with no action being taken.

== International career ==
Born in the London Borough of Hillingdon, he qualifies for Northern Ireland through his mother, who is from Belfast. In September 2019, he was called up to the under-21 side for the 2021 UEFA European Under-21 Championship qualifiers against Malta and Finland. Six days later he was drafted into the senior squad and made his debut against Luxembourg in a friendly.

== Career statistics ==
=== Club ===
As of match played 6 March 2026

Appearances and goals by club, season and competition
Club	Season	League			National cup (Note: Includes FA Cup, Scottish Cup)		League cup (Note: Includes EFL Cup, Scottish League Cup)		Other		Total	
Club	Season	Division	Apps	Goals	Apps	Goals	Apps	Goals	Apps	Goals	Apps	Goals
Bedfont Sports	2015–16	CCL Premier Division	34	1	0	0	—		0	0	34	1
Wealdstone	2016–17	National League South	28	1	1	0	—		3 (Note: Appearances in FA Trophy)	0	32	1
Wealdstone	2017–18	National League South	18	1	0	0	—		1	0	19	1
Wealdstone	Total		46	2	1	0	0	0	4	0	51	2
Cardiff City	2017–18	Championship	0	0	0	0	0	0	—		0	0
Cardiff City	2018–19	Premier League	0	0	0	0	0	0	—		0	0
Cardiff City	2019–20	Championship	0	0	0	0	1	0	0	0	1	0
Cardiff City	2020–21	Championship	12	0	0	0	0	0	—		12	0
Cardiff City	2021–22	Championship	5	0	1	0	0	0	—		6	0
Cardiff City	Total		17	0	1	0	1	0	0	0	19	0
Livingston (loan)	2018–19	Scottish Premiership	5	0	0	0	0	0	—		5	0
Livingston (loan)	2019–20	Scottish Premiership	9	0	2	0	0	0	—		11	0
Livingston (loan)	2020–21	Scottish Premiership	16	1	0	0	2	0	—		18	1
Livingston (loan)	Total		30	1	2	0	2	0	—		34	1
Oxford United (loan)	2021–22	League One	13	1	0	0	0	0	0	0	13	1
Oxford United	2022–23	League One	44	2	2	0	2	0	1 (Note: Appearance in EFL Trophy)	0	49	2
Oxford United	2023–24	League One	45	5	3	0	1	0	5 (Note: 3 appearances in League One play-offs and 2 appearances in EFL Trophy)	0	54	5
Oxford United	2024–25	Championship	41	4	0	0	1	0	0	0	42	4
Oxford United	2025–26	Championship	27	3	1	0	0	0	—		28	3
Oxford United	Total		157	14	6	0	4	0	6	0	173	14
Career total			297	19	10	0	7	0	10	0	324	19

=== International ===
As of match played 2 October 2026

Scores and results list Northern Ireland's goal tally first, score column indicates score after each Brown goal.

List of international goals scored by Ciaron Brown
No.	Date	Venue	Opponent	Score	Result	Competition
1	2 October 2026	Anton Malatinský Stadium, Trnava, Slovakia	Ukraine	1–0	3–0	2026–27 UEFA Nations League B
2	2 October 2026	Anton Malatinský Stadium, Trnava, Slovakia	Ukraine	3–0	3–0	2026–27 UEFA Nations League B

== Honours ==
Oxford United

- EFL League One play-offs: 2024

Individual

- Oxford United Player of the Year: 2022–23, 2024–25
