= Cameron Brannagan =

English footballer (born 1996)

- Brannagan being interviewed as an Oxford United player in 2026

Personal information
- Full name: Cameron Mark Thomas Brannagan
- Date of birth: 9 May 1996 (age 30)
- Place of birth: Manchester, England
- Height: 5 ft 11 in (1.80 m)
- Position: Midfielder

Team information
- Current team: Oxford United
- Number: 8

Youth career
- 2001–2014: Liverpool

Senior career*
Years	Team	Apps	(Gls)
2014–2018	Liverpool	3	(0)
2017	→ Fleetwood Town (loan)	13	(0)
2018–	Oxford United	325	(56)

International career
2014	England U18	2	(0)
2015	England U20	2	(0)
- * Club domestic league appearances and goals as of 19:17, 21 November 2026 (UTC)

Cameron Mark Thomas Brannagan (born 9 May 1996) is an English professional footballer who plays as a midfielder for EFL League One club Oxford United. He is the team's captain.

An academy graduate of Liverpool, Brannagan made his senior debut in 2015 but managed just nine appearances for the club. He joined Fleetwood Town on loan in 2017 before signing for Oxford United on a permanent deal the following year.

== Club career ==
=== Liverpool ===
Born in Manchester, Brannagan was raised in Boothstown, Salford. Despite growing up supporting Manchester United, as did his family, he joined Liverpool as a child, having previously been at Manchester City and Manchester United's academies.

Having previously played extensively for the under-21s, Brannagan then featured in the reserve side for most of the 2015-16 season. While still playing for the reserve side, on 17 September 2015, he made his senior Reds debut as a substitute in their opening UEFA Europa League group stage fixture against Bordeaux. On 15 May 2016, he made his first Premier League start, in the last game of the season, a 1–1 draw against West Bromwich Albion. By the end of the 2015–16 season, Brannagan had made a total of nine first-team appearances in all competitions.

In May 2016, it was reported that Brannagan was in a contract negotiations with Liverpool over a new deal. However, the contract negotiations resulted in a disagreement between the parties over his pathway to the first team over the summer of 2017 and he was dropped from the club's pre-season tour as a result. Brannagan spent the first half of the season in the reserve team, despite suffering a broken hand. In the last two remaining matches for the club's reserves, Brannagan scored two goals in two matches, against Sunderland U23 and Swansea City U23.

==== Loan to Fleetwood Town ====
On 5 July 2016, Liverpool rejected an offer in excess of £1,000,000 for Brannagan from newly promoted Championship side Wigan Athletic. After this, Brannagan expected to leave Liverpool on loan to gain first-team experience, as Wigan Athletic, having had their transfer bid rejected, tried to sign him on loan instead, but it fell through. On 27 January 2017, after injuries starved Brannagan of first-team action at Liverpool, he was loaned out to League One side Fleetwood Town for the remainder of the season.

Brannagan made his Fleetwood Town debut, coming on as a second-half substitute, in a 1–1 draw against Charlton Athletic on 4 February 2017. He was praised after his debut for his "creativity and quality" by manager Uwe Rösler. Manager Rösler placed him "in a number 10 role up front with Devante Cole", though he appeared on the substitute bench. He played a role in a 1–0 win over Walsall on 14 March 2017 when he set up Cian Bolger to score the only goal of the game. Brannagan also appeared once in the play-offs, in a 0–0 draw against Bradford City, a game that saw Fleetwood Town eliminated on aggregate after defeat in the first leg.

At the end of the 2016–17 season, having made 14 appearances in all competitions, he returned to his parent club.

=== Oxford United ===
Brannagan signed for League One side Oxford United on a 3 1/2-year deal for an undisclosed fee on 11 January 2018, the move ending his 16-year association with Liverpool. However, his Oxford United career suffered an early setback when he injured his ankle. He made his debut in a 2–1 league defeat away at AFC Wimbledon on 10 March 2018. The following season, on 29 September 2018 and against the same opponents, Brannagan scored his first goal for Oxford, though the result was another 2–1 victory for Wimbledon. He won the Players' Player of the Year Award for the 2018–19 season.

On 29 January 2022, Brannagan scored a first career hat-trick in a 7–2 away defeat of Gillingham, scoring all four of his goals from the penalty spot, becoming the first player in the league's 138-year history to score four penalties in a match. At the end of the 2021–22 season he won both the supporters' and players' Player of the Year awards.

On the morning of 28 July 2022, it was reported that Blackpool had triggered Brannagan's release clause and that he was travelling up to the North-West to sign for the Championship club. Despite seemingly being set to sign, Brannagan signed a new three-year contract with Oxford that evening.

During his long tenure at the Kassam Stadium, Brannagan became widely regarded as a talismanic player, playing his 250th game for the club in 2023. United finished that season in the play-offs, beating Peterborough United 2-1 on aggregate in the semi-final. Brannagan scored what proved to be the winning goal from the penalty spot in the second leg at Peterborough's London Road stadium.

Brannagan was in the starting line-up for Oxford's 2-0 victory over Bolton in the 2024 EFL League One play-off final at Wembley Stadium, but an injury in the 64th minute meant he had to be replaced by Marcus McGuane.

Oxford survived their first season in the Championship, and following the departure of Elliott Moore during the summer of 2025, Brannagan was given the captain's armband.

== International career ==
Brannagan has represented England at under-18 level. He earned two caps for the U18s in March 2014, both against Croatia.

A year later in August 2015, Brannagan was called up to the England U20 squad. He earned two caps for the U20s in September 2014, both against Czech Republic U20.

== Career statistics ==
As of match played 27 October 2026

Appearances and goals by club, season and competition
Club	Season	League			FA Cup		League Cup		Other		Total	
Club	Season	Division	Apps	Goals	Apps	Goals	Apps	Goals	Apps	Goals	Apps	Goals
Liverpool	2015–16	Premier League	3	0	3	0	1	0	2 (Note: Appearances in the Europa League)	0	9	0
Liverpool	2016–17	Premier League	0	0	0	0	0	0	0	0	0	0
Liverpool	2017–18	Premier League	0	0	0	0	0	0	0	0	0	0
Liverpool	Total		3	0	3	0	1	0	2	0	9	0
Fleetwood Town (loan)	2016–17	League One	13	0	0	0	0	0	1 (Note: Appearance in the League One play-offs)	0	14	0
Oxford United	2017–18	League One	12	0	0	0	0	0	0	0	12	0
Oxford United	2018–19	League One	41	3	3	1	3	0	6 (Note: Appearances in Football League Trophy)	2	53	6
Oxford United	2019–20	League One	30	5	1	0	3	1	5 (Note: Two appearances and one goal in the Football League Trophy and three appearances in the League One play-offs)	1	39	7
Oxford United	2020–21	League One	31	1	0	0	2	1	7 (Note: Five appearances in the Football League Trophy and two appearances in the League One play-offs)	0	40	2
Oxford United	2021–22	League One	41	14	1	0	1	0	1 (Note: One appearance in the Football League Trophy)	0	44	14
Oxford United	2022–23	League One	44	9	3	1	2	1	2	1	51	12
Oxford United	2023–24	League One	43	12	3	0	1	0	4 (Note: Appearance in the Football League Trophy and three appearances, 1 goal in the League One play-offs)	1	51	13
Oxford United	2024–25	Championship	33	3	0	0	2	0	0	0	35	3
Oxford United	2025–26	Championship	37	6	2	0	2	0	0	0	41	6
Oxford United	2026–27	League One	11	2	0	0	1	0	1	0	13	2
Oxford United	Total		323	55	13	2	17	3	26	5	379	65
Career total			339	55	16	2	18	3	29	5	402	65

== Honours ==
Oxford United

- EFL League One play-offs: 2024

Individual

- PFA Team of the Year: 2019–20 League One, 2021–22 League One, 2023–24 League One
- Oxford United Player of the Year: 2021–22
