= Gatlin O'Donkor =

English footballer (born 2004)

Personal information
- Full name: Gatlin Teye O'Donkor
- Date of birth: 14 October 2004 (age 22)
- Place of birth: Reading, England
- Position: Forward

Team information
- Current team: Oxford United
- Number: 19

Youth career
- –2020: Oxford United

Senior career*
Years	Team	Apps	(Gls)
2020–	Oxford United	64	(6)
2022	→ Oxford City (loan)	4	(1)
2024	→ Barnet (loan)	13	(5)
2024–2025	→ Bristol Rovers (loan)	28	(4)
- * Club domestic league appearances and goals as of 23:01, 4 November 2026 (UTC)

Gatlin Teye O'Donkor (born 14 October 2004) is an English footballer who plays as a forward for EFL League One club Oxford United.

== Career ==
O'Donkor set the record for the youngest ever Oxford United player at the age of 16 years and 55 days when he made his debut on 8 December 2020 in an EFL Trophy tie against Forest Green Rovers. After the match was drawn 1–1, he scored Oxford United's opening penalty in the penalty shoot-out as they won 4–1 on penalties.

On 5 March 2022, O'Donkor joined National League South side Oxford City on an initial one-month loan deal. He made his debut that day, scoring the third in a 5–0 defeat of Tonbridge Angels. He returned to his parent club and made his league debut for Oxford United as a second-half substitute in the last game of the 2021–22 season, a 1–1 draw with Doncaster Rovers, on 30 April 2022. He signed his first professional contract with the club in August 2022. His first senior start came in a 2nd-round EFL Cup defeat to Crystal Palace on 23 August 2022, and his first League start in a 2–1 home victory over Burton Albion on 3 September 2022. He scored his first senior goal for the club having come on as a half-time substitute in a League One fixture against Fleetwood Town on 1 November 2022; the game ended in a 1–1 draw.

On 9 February 2024, O'Donkor joined Barnet on loan until the end of the season.

On 30 August 2024, O'Donkor joined League One club Bristol Rovers on a season-long loan deal. He made his debut the following day as a late substitute in a 2–0 victory over Cambridge United. On 21 September 2024, he scored his first goal for the club in a 3–2 defeat to Peterborough United.

== Personal life ==
Born in England, O'Donkor is of Ghanaian descent.

== Career statistics ==
As of match played 4 November 2026

Appearances and goals by club, season and competition
Club	Season	League			FA Cup		EFL Cup		Other		Total	
Club	Season	Division	Apps	Goals	Apps	Goals	Apps	Goals	Apps	Goals	Apps	Goals
Oxford United	2020–21	League One	0	0	0	0	0	0	1 (Note: Appearance(s) in EFL Trophy)	0	1	0
Oxford United	2021–22	League One	1	0	0	0	0	0	3 (Note: Appearance(s) in EFL Trophy and Oxfordshire Senior Cup)	0	4	0
Oxford United	2022–23	League One	29	2	3	0	1	0	2	0	35	2
Oxford United	2023–24	League One	20	0	2	0	1	0	3	0	26	0
Oxford United	2024–25	Championship	1	0	0	0	1	0	—		2	0
Oxford United	2025–26	Championship	1	0	0	0	1	0	—		2	0
Oxford United	2026–27	League One	12	4	0	0	1	0	1	0	14	4
Oxford United	Total		57	5	5	0	5	0	9	0	76	5
Oxford City (loan)	2021–22	National League South	4 (Note: Soccerway credits O'Donkor with a 5th appearance v Dulwich Hamlet on 9 April 2022 but the Oxford City website lists him as an unused substitute.)	1	—		—		0	0	4	1
Barnet (loan)	2023–24	National League	13	5	—		—		2 (Note: Appearance(s) in FA Trophy)	1	15	6
Bristol Rovers (loan)	2024–25	League One	28	4	2	0	0	0	1	0	31	4
Career total			102	15	7	0	5	0	12	1	126	16
