= Steve Seddon =

English footballer

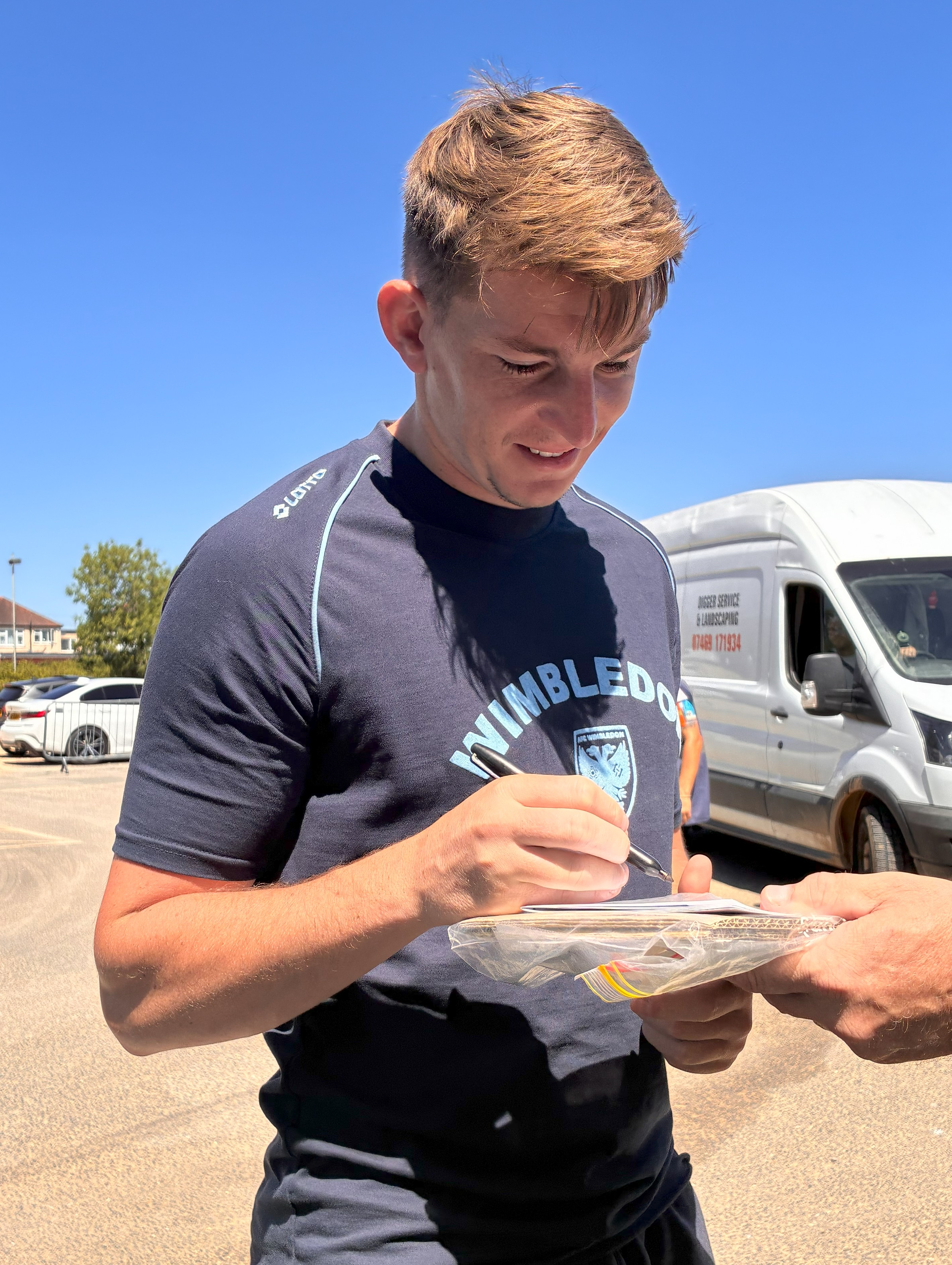
- Seddon with AFC Wimbledon in 2025.

Personal information
- Full name: Steven Jeffrey Seddon
- Date of birth: 25 December 1997 (age 28)
- Place of birth: Berkshire, England
- Height: 1.79 m (5 ft 10 in)
- Positions: Left-back; left wing-back

Team information
- Current team: AFC Wimbledon
- Number: 3

Youth career
- Twyford Comets
- 20??–2014: Reading
- 2014–2016: Birmingham City

Senior career*
Years	Team	Apps	(Gls)
2016–2021	Birmingham City	11	(0)
2018–2019	→ Stevenage (loan)	23	(3)
2019	→ AFC Wimbledon (loan)	18	(3)
2020	→ Portsmouth (loan)	12	(1)
2020–2021	→ AFC Wimbledon (loan)	16	(1)
2021–2024	Oxford United	49	(3)
2023	→ Cambridge United (loan)	10	(0)
2023–2024	→ Burton Albion (loan)	36	(3)
2024–2025	Motherwell	14	(0)
2025–	AFC Wimbledon	59	(1)
- * Club domestic league appearances and goals as of 1 November 2026 (UTC)

Steven Jeffrey Seddon (born 25 December 1997) is an English professional footballer who plays as a left-back or left wing-back for EFL League One club AFC Wimbledon.

Seddon was on the books of Reading as a youngster before joining Birmingham City in 2014 when he left school. He spent the first half of the 2018–19 season on loan to League Two club Stevenage, for whom he made his Football League debut, and the second half on loan to AFC Wimbledon of League One. In 2019–20 he was loaned to Portsmouth and he spent the first half of the 2020–21 season back with AFC Wimbledon. He made 12 appearances for Birmingham before leaving for Oxford United in 2021. He played regularly for his first season and then spent time on loan at Cambridge United and Burton Albion. Seddon returned to Wimbledon in the summer of 2025 following the expiration of his contract with Motherwell.

== Career ==
=== Early life and career ===
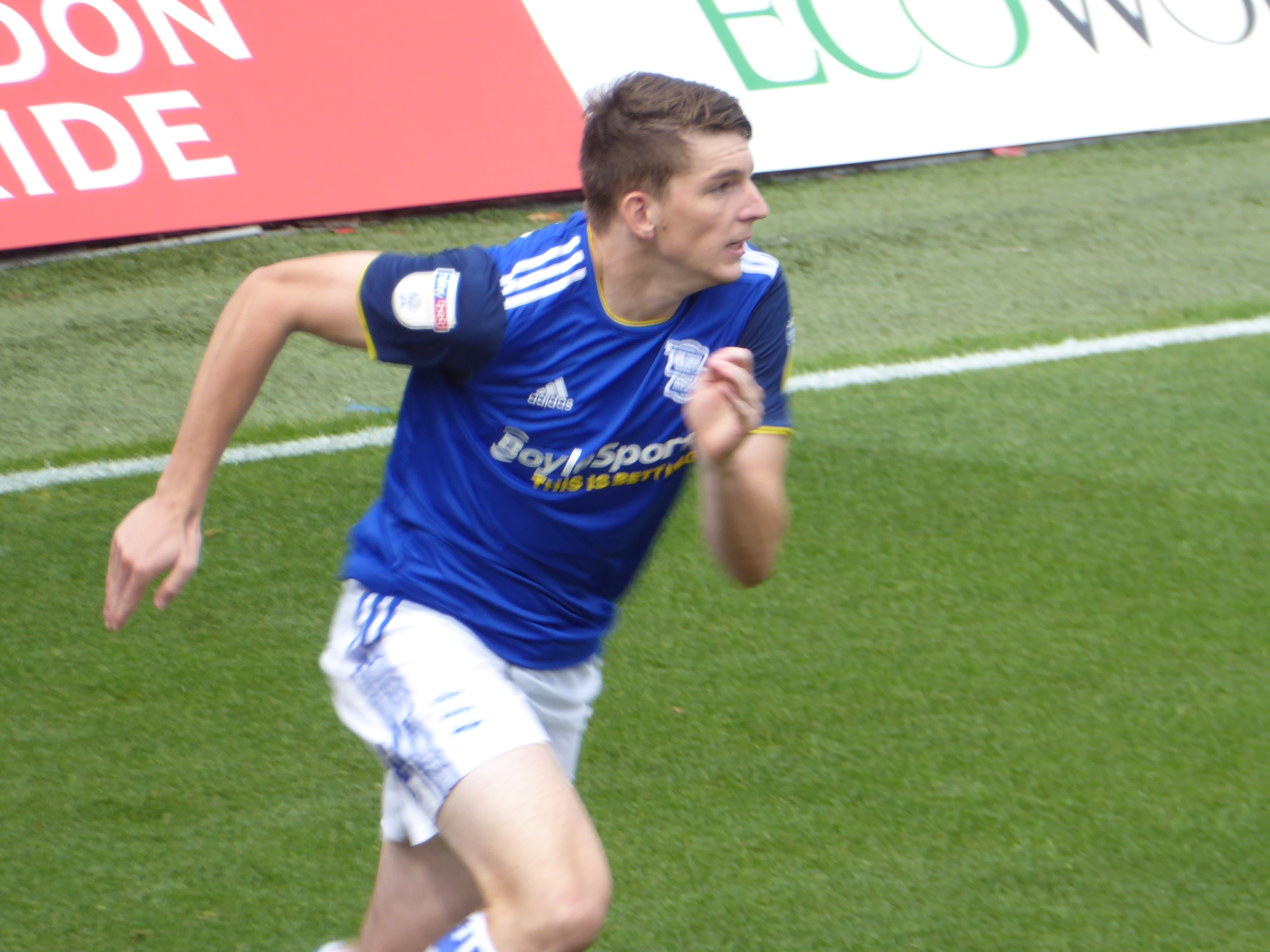
Seddon with Birmingham City in 2019.

Seddon was born in Berkshire. An older brother is the British steeplechaser Zak Seddon, who is coached by their father, Jeff. They have another brother, Matthew. Seddon attended The Piggott School in Wargrave and then The Forest School, Winnersh, the partner school of Reading F.C.'s academy. While at school, he was a classmate of future AFC Wimbledon teammate Matty Stevens.

He joined Reading after being spotted when playing for Twyford Comets. After a trial with Birmingham City in 2014, he took up a scholarship with the club that summer. Interviewed later that year, he assessed his strength as his left foot, and felt he needed to improve his tackling.

He signed his first professional contract, of two years, in April 2016. In the 2017–18 season, he trained with the first team on occasion, and was included in the travelling squad for first-team fixtures, although did not make the bench. In December, with centre-back Harlee Dean suspended, Seddon was suggested by the Birmingham Mail as a possible addition to the squad for the visit to Fulham, and on 27 January 2018, he was given a squad number and included among the substitutes for the FA Cup fourth-round visit to Premier League club Huddersfield Town. He remained unused, and later in the season was an unused substitute for two Championship matches.

In May 2018, Seddon signed a new one-year deal, with the option of a second year. He was a member of the first-team squad for their pre-season training camp in Austria, and was given a squad number for the 2018–19 season. He was an unused substitute for the 2018–19 EFL Cup first-round defeat away to Reading.

=== Stevenage (loan) ===
Seddon joined League Two club Stevenage on 30 August 2018 on loan until 15 January 2019. He made his Football League debut two days later in the starting eleven for the match at home to Cambridge United; he was substituted at half-time as his team went on to lose 1–0. Seddon made 25 appearances during his loan spell, of which 23 were in league competition.

=== AFC Wimbledon (loan) ===
The day after his loan at Stevenage expired, Seddon joined AFC Wimbledon of League One on loan until the end of the season. He went straight into the starting eleven, playing the whole of a 4–1 defeat at home to Barnsley, but suffered a minor hamstring injury that kept him out of the next match. He returned to the starting eleven for the visit to Sunderland, and stayed in it for the remaining 16 league matches, finishing with a 12-match unbeaten run that secured his team's League One status for the 2019–20 season.

=== First-team football with Birmingham City ===
Seddon made his first competitive appearance for Birmingham in the starting eleven for the opening fixture of the 2019–20 season, a visit to Brentford in the Championship. He marked his debut with a run and cross to set up Kristian Pedersen's matchwinning header. He started twice more in the league, and provided the assist for Álvaro Giménez' first goal for the club, in a 2–0 win against Barnsley, but played no part in the matchday squad after the end of August.

=== Portsmouth (loan) ===
Seddon joined League One club Portsmouth on 2 January 2020 on loan until the end of the season.

=== Return to AFC Wimbledon ===
Seddon was an unused substitute for two of Birmingham's first three matches of the 2020–21 season, before returning to AFC Wimbledon on 24 September on loan for the rest of the campaign. He marked his second debut, two days later away to Fleetwood Town, with the only goal of the match after "a determined charge from the back". He had made 19 appearances in all competitions when he was recalled from loan on 31 December 2020.

=== Return to Birmingham ===
Birmingham's head coach, Aitor Karanka, recalled Seddon to assess his readiness to play a part in the first team, particularly as regular left-back Pedersen was injured. He was an unused substitute on 2 January, but that was the last time Karanka included him in the matchday squad. Incoming head coach Lee Bowyer selected him on the bench for his first match in charge, gave him a few minutes at the end, and then included him in the starting eleven for the visit of Swansea City on 2 April. Despite a rash first-half booking (attributed by Bowyer to nerves and enthusiasm) and replacement at half-time by the experienced George Friend, Seddon started three of the next five matches as Birmingham secured their Championship survival, and the club took up the one-year option on his contract.

=== Oxford United ===
Seddon signed a three-year contract with League One club Oxford United on 22 July 2021; the fee was undisclosed. He made his debut on the opening day of the season, playing the whole of the visit to Cambridge United. After 42 minutes, he "arrived at the back post to meet Ryan Williams's cross and lashed an effort" past the goalkeeper to open the scoring; the match ended 1–1.

He played regularly during his first season, but spent most of the remainder of his contract out on loan, and was released at the end of the 2023–24 season.

==== Cambridge United (loan) ====
Seddon joined League One club Cambridge United on 6 January 2023 on loan until the end of the season. He went straight into the starting eleven for the next day's match at home to Bristol Rovers, but lasted only until first-half stoppage-time when he was stretchered off with a head injury after colliding with his own goalkeeper.

==== Burton Albion (loan) ====
On 14 July 2023, Seddon joined League One club Burton Albion on a season-long loan.

=== Motherwell ===
Seddon joined Scottish Premiership club Motherwell on 2 July 2024 on a one-year contract with an option for a second year.

=== AFC Wimbledon ===
On 24 June 2025, Seddon signed a one-year contract with newly promoted EFL League One club AFC Wimbledon, marking his third spell with the club following two previous loans. He re-signed with the club for a further year in June 2026.

== Career statistics ==
As of end of 2025–26 season

Appearances and goals by club, season and competition
Club	Season	League			National cup (Note: Includes FA Cup, Scottish Cup)		League cup (Note: Includes EFL Cup, Scottish League Cup)		Other		Total	
Club	Season	Division	Apps	Goals	Apps	Goals	Apps	Goals	Apps	Goals	Apps	Goals
Birmingham City	2017–18	Championship	0	0	0	0	0	0	—		0	0
Birmingham City	2018–19	Championship	0	0	0	0	0	0	—		0	0
Birmingham City	2019–20	Championship	4	0	0	0	1	0	—		5	0
Birmingham City	2020–21	Championship	7	0	—		0	0	—		7	0
Birmingham City	Total		11	0	0	0	1	0	—		12	0
Stevenage (loan)	2018–19	League Two	23	3	1	0	—		1 (Note: Appearance(s) in EFL Trophy)	0	25	3
AFC Wimbledon (loan)	2018–19	League One	18	3	—		—		—		18	3
Portsmouth (loan)	2019–20	League One	12	1	3	0	—		3 (Note: Two appearances in EFL Trophy, one in EFL League One play-offs)	0	18	1
AFC Wimbledon (loan)	2020–21	League One	16	1	2	0	—		1	0	19	1
Oxford United	2021–22	League One	36	2	2	1	1	0	1	0	40	3
Oxford United	2022–23	League One	13	1	1	0	2	0	2	0	18	1
Oxford United	2023–24	League One	0	0	0	0	0	0	0	0	0	0
Oxford United	Total		49	3	3	1	3	0	3	0	58	4
Cambridge United (loan)	2022–23	League One	10	0	—		—		—		10	0
Burton Albion (loan)	2023–24	League One	36	3	1	0	1	0	4	0	42	3
Motherwell	2024–25	Scottish Premiership	14	0	0	0	3	0	—		17	0
AFC Wimbledon	2025-26	League One	46	1	1	0	2	0	4	0	53	1
AFC Wimbledon	AFC Wimbledon Total		80	5	3	0	2	0	5	0	90	5
Career total			235	15	11	1	10	0	17	0	272	16
