= Marcus McGuane =

English footballer (born 1999)

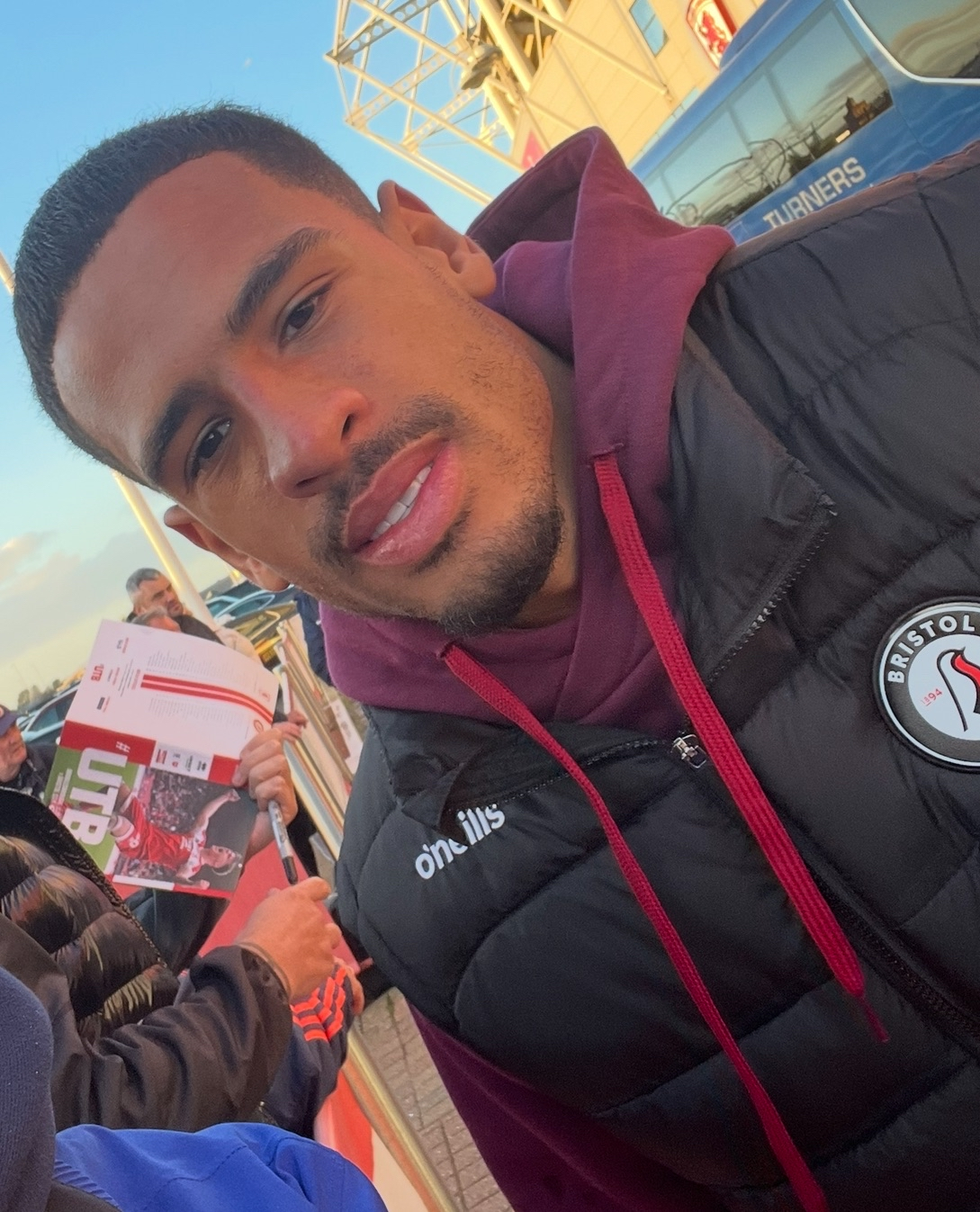
- McGuane in 2024.

Personal information
- Full name: Marcus Samuel Michael McGuane
- Date of birth: 2 February 1999 (age 27)
- Place of birth: Greenwich, England
- Height: 5 ft 10 in (1.78 m)
- Position: Central midfielder

Team information
- Current team: Huddersfield Town
- Number: 17

Youth career
- 2005–2017: Arsenal

Senior career*
Years	Team	Apps	(Gls)
2017–2018	Arsenal	0	(0)
2018–2020	Barcelona B	24	(0)
2019–2020	→ Telstar (loan)	14	(1)
2020–2021	Nottingham Forest	0	(0)
2020–2021	→ Oxford United (loan)	15	(0)
2021–2024	Oxford United	113	(1)
2024–2025	Bristol City	21	(0)
2025–	Huddersfield Town	13	(0)

International career
2015–2016	Republic of Ireland U17	3	(0)
2015–2016	England U17	8	(0)
2016–2017	England U18	8	(0)
2017–2018	England U19	4	(0)
- * Club domestic league appearances and goals as of 14 August 2026 (UTC)

Marcus Samuel Michael McGuane (/məˈɡweɪn/ mə-GWAYN; born 2 February 1999) is an English professional footballer who plays as a central midfielder for EFL League One club Huddersfield Town.

== Club career ==
=== Arsenal ===
Born in Greenwich, London, McGuane is a product of Arsenal's Hale End Academy having joined at the under-6 level. He was the captain of the Arsenal under-18s and a regular for the under-23 side. On 28 September 2017, McGuane was named on the bench for Arsenal's UEFA Europa League match against BATE Borisov. He came on as a 79th-minute substitute for Reiss Nelson as Arsenal won 4–2.

=== Barcelona ===
On 30 January 2018, McGuane signed with FC Barcelona, being assigned to their B-team in the Spanish second tier. His buyout clause was set at €25 million. On 7 March 2018, McGuane played for the Barcelona first team in the Supercopa de Catalunya, coming on as a 77th-minute substitute for Aleix Vidal, and becoming the first English player to represent Barça in 29 years, after Gary Lineker. His team defeated RCD Espanyol on penalties after a goalless draw.

On 2 September 2019, McGuane joined Eerste Divisie side Telstar on a season-long loan deal.

=== Nottingham Forest ===
On 26 February 2020, McGuane returned to England with EFL Championship side Nottingham Forest on a two-and-a-half-year deal, initially joining their Under-23s squad.

=== Oxford United ===
McGuane joined Oxford United on a season-long loan on 15 August 2020, making his league debut for the club on 12 September in a 2–0 defeat at Lincoln City.

On 6 May 2021, McGuane signed a three-year contract at the club, for an undisclosed fee. In January 2024 he was linked to a move to Polish side Legia Warsaw.

=== Bristol City ===
On 23 August 2024, McGuane joined fellow Championship side Bristol City for an undisclosed fee, signing a two-year deal.

=== Huddersfield Town ===
On 23 July 2025, McGuane joined League One club Huddersfield Town, signing a three-year contract for an undisclosed fee.

== International career ==
McGuane was eligible for both England and the Republic of Ireland at international level, qualifying for England through birth and the Republic of Ireland through his maternal grandparents who were born in Portlaoise and County Cork. McGuane is also of Ghanaian descent.

McGuane represented the Republic of Ireland at the 2015 UEFA European Under-17 Championship, including an appearance against England on 13 May 2015.

However, in November 2015, McGuane made his first appearance for England under-17s against Germany, going on to appear for England at the 2016 UEFA European Under-17 Championship.

== Career statistics ==
As of match played 12 May 2025

Appearances and goals by club, season and competition
Club	Season	League			National cup (Note: Includes KNVB Cup, FA Cup)		League cup (Note: Includes EFL Cup)		Continental		Other		Total	
Club	Season	Division	Apps	Goals	Apps	Goals	Apps	Goals	Apps	Goals	Apps	Goals	Apps	Goals
Arsenal	2017–18	Premier League	0	0	0	0	0	0	2 (Note: Appearances in the 2017–18 Europa League)	0	—		2	0
Barcelona B	2017–18	Segunda División	8	0	—		—		—		—		8	0
Barcelona B	2018–19	Segunda División B	16	0	—		—		—		—		16	0
Barcelona B	Total		24	0	—		—		—		—		26	0
Telstar (loan)	2019–20	Eerste Divisie	14	1	2	0	—		—		—		16	1
Nottingham Forest	2020–21	Championship	0	0	0	0	0	0	0	0	—		0	0
Oxford United (loan)	2020–21	League One	15	0	1	0	2	0	3 (Note: Appearances in the Football League Trophy)	0	—		21	0
Oxford United	2021–22	League One	30	0	2	1	2	0	1	0	—		35	1
Oxford United	2022–23	League One	44	0	3	0	1	0	0	0	—		48	0
Oxford United	2023–24	League One	21	1	2	1	1	0	0	0	—		24	2
Oxford United	Total		95	1	7	2	4	0	1	0	0	0	107	3
Bristol City	2024–25	EFL Championship	21	0	0	0	0	0	0	0	2 (Note: Appearances in EFL Championship play-offs)	0	23	0
Career total			169	2	10	2	6	0	6	0	2	0	193	4

== Honours ==
Oxford United

- EFL League One play-offs: 2024
