= 2020–21 EFL League One =

English football league season

EFL League One
- Season: 2020–21
- Dates: 12 September 2020 – 9 May 2021
- Champions: Hull City
- Promoted: Hull City; Peterborough United; Blackpool
- Relegated: Rochdale; Northampton Town; Swindon Town; Bristol Rovers
- Matches: 552
- Goals: 1,447 (2.62 per match)
- Top goalscorer: Jonson Clarke-Harris (31 goals)
- Biggest home win: Peterborough United 7–0 Accrington Stanley (27 March 2021)
- Biggest away win: Crewe Alexandra 0–6 Oxford United (10 April 2021); Plymouth Argyle 0–6 Charlton Athletic (20 April 2021)
- Highest scoring: AFC Wimbledon 4–4 Plymouth Argyle (19 September 2020); Charlton Athletic 4–4 Rochdale (12 January 2021)
- Longest winning run: Oxford United (7 games)
- Longest unbeaten run: Blackpool (16 games)
- Longest winless run: Burton Albion, Northampton Town, AFC Wimbledon (11 games)
- Longest losing run: Plymouth Argyle (6 games)
- Highest attendance: 3,204; Oxford United vs Blackpool (18 May 2021)
- Lowest attendance: 1,000; Shrewsbury Town vs Northampton Town (19 September 2020)
- Total attendance: 53,321
- Average attendance: 1,904
- All statistics correct as of 24 April 2021.

The 2020–21 EFL League One (referred to as the Sky Bet League One for sponsorship reasons) was the 17th season of Football League One under its current title and the 29th season under its current league division format.

== Team changes ==
The following teams have changed division since the 2019–20 season.

=== To League One ===
Promoted from League Two

- Swindon Town
- Crewe Alexandra
- Plymouth Argyle
- Northampton Town

Relegated from Championship

- Charlton Athletic
- Wigan Athletic (Note: Wigan Athletic were deducted 12 points by the EFL for entering administration. The club appealed against the decision, and it was confirmed on 4 August 2020 that it had not been upheld. Therefore, Wigan will not be reprieved from relegation.)
- Hull City

=== From League One ===
Promoted to Championship

- Coventry City
- Rotherham United
- Wycombe Wanderers

Relegated to League Two

- Bolton Wanderers
- Southend United
- Tranmere Rovers

Expelled from the EFL

- Bury

== Stadiums ==
Locations of the confirmed 2020–21 EFL League One teams

Team	Location	Stadium	Capacity
Accrington Stanley	Accrington	Crown Ground	5,057
AFC Wimbledon	London (Wimbledon)	Plough Lane	9,300
Blackpool	Blackpool	Bloomfield Road	17,338
Bristol Rovers	Bristol	Memorial Stadium	12,300
Burton Albion	Burton upon Trent	Pirelli Stadium	6,912
Charlton Athletic	London (Charlton)	The Valley	27,111
Crewe Alexandra	Crewe	Gresty Road	10,180
Doncaster Rovers	Doncaster	Keepmoat Stadium	15,231
Fleetwood Town	Fleetwood	Highbury Stadium	5,327
Gillingham	Gillingham	Priestfield Stadium	11,582
Hull City	Kingston upon Hull	KCOM Stadium	25,586
Ipswich Town	Ipswich	Portman Road	30,311
Lincoln City	Lincoln	LNER Stadium	10,120
Milton Keynes Dons	Milton Keynes	Stadium MK	30,500
Northampton Town	Northampton	PTS Academy Stadium	7,798
Oxford United	Oxford	Kassam Stadium	12,500
Peterborough United	Peterborough	Weston Homes Stadium	15,314
Plymouth Argyle	Plymouth	Home Park	17,300
Portsmouth	Portsmouth	Fratton Park	19,669
Rochdale	Rochdale	Crown Oil Arena	10,500
Shrewsbury Town	Shrewsbury	Montgomery Waters Meadow	9,875
Sunderland	Sunderland	Stadium of Light	48,707
Swindon Town	Swindon	County Ground	15,728
Wigan Athletic	Wigan	DW Stadium	25,133

== Personnel and sponsoring ==
Team	Manager^{1}	Captain	Kit manufacturer	Sponsor
Accrington Stanley	(England) John Coleman	(Republic of Ireland) Séamus Conneely	Adidas	Wham
AFC Wimbledon	(England) Mark Robinson	(England) Alex Woodyard	Puma	Sports Interactive
Blackpool	(England) Neil Critchley	(Wales) Chris Maxwell	Puma	Blackpool Council; Home: "VisitBlackpool.com"; Away: "Get Vocal"
Bristol Rovers	(England) Joey Barton	(Germany) Max Ehmer	Macron	Utilita
Burton Albion	(Netherlands) Jimmy Floyd Hasselbaink	(England) John Brayford	TAG	Prestec UK Ltd
Charlton Athletic	(England) Nigel Adkins	(England) Jason Pearce	Hummel	Children with Cancer UK
Crewe Alexandra	(Gibraltar) David Artell	(England) Harry Pickering	FBT	Mornflake
Doncaster Rovers	(England) Andy Butler (interim)	(England) Tom Anderson	Elite Pro Sports	LNER
Fleetwood Town	(England) Simon Grayson	(England) Callum Connolly	Hummel	BES Utilities
Gillingham	(Scotland) Steve Evans	(England) Kyle Dempsey	Macron	MEMS Power Generation
Hull City	(Northern Ireland) Grant McCann	(England) Richie Smallwood	Umbro	Giacom
Ipswich Town	(England) Paul Cook	(England) Luke Chambers	Adidas	Carers Trust
Lincoln City	(England) Michael Appleton	(Scotland) Liam Bridcutt	Erreà	Peregrine Holdings
Milton Keynes Dons	(Scotland) Russell Martin	(England) Dean Lewington	Erreà	Suzuki
Northampton Town	(Australia) Jon Brady	(Republic of Ireland) Cian Bolger	Hummel	University of Northampton
Oxford United	(England) Karl Robinson	(England) John Mousinho	Puma	Amazing Thailand
Peterborough United	(Scotland) Darren Ferguson	(England) Mark Beevers	Puma	Mick George Group
Plymouth Argyle	(England) Ryan Lowe	(England) Gary Sawyer	Puma	Ginsters
Portsmouth	(England) Danny Cowley	(England) Tom Naylor	Nike	University of Portsmouth
Rochdale	(Republic of Ireland) Brian Barry-Murphy	(Republic of Ireland) Eoghan O'Connell	Erreà	Crown Oil Ltd
Shrewsbury Town	(England) Steve Cotterill	(Grenada) Oliver Norburn	Admiral	Tuffins Supermarkets (Home); Shropshire Homes (Away)
Sunderland	(England) Lee Johnson	(England) Max Power	Nike	Great Annual Savings Group
Swindon Town	(Scotland) Tommy Wright (interim)	(England) Dion Conroy	Puma	Imagine Cruising
Wigan Athletic	(England) Leam Richardson	(England) Jamie Jones	Puma	Wigan Athletic Official Supporters Club

== Managerial changes ==
Team	Outgoing manager	Manner of departure	Date of vacancy	Position in table	Incoming manager	Date of appointment
Wigan Athletic	(England) Paul Cook	Resigned	29 July 2020	Pre-season	(Republic of Ireland) John Sheridan	11 September 2020
Swindon Town	(England) Richie Wellens	Signed by Salford City	4 November 2020	20th	(Republic of Ireland) John Sheridan	13 November 2020
Wigan Athletic	(Republic of Ireland) John Sheridan	Signed by Swindon Town	13 November 2020	24th	(England) Leam Richardson (Note: Richardson was originally appointed as caretaker manager before being permanently appointed as manager on 21 April 2021)	13 November 2020
Bristol Rovers	(England) Ben Garner	Sacked	14 November 2020	18th	(England) Paul Tisdale	19 November 2020
Shrewsbury Town	(Wales) Sam Ricketts	Sacked	25 November 2020	23rd	(England) Steve Cotterill	27 November 2020
Sunderland	(England) Phil Parkinson	Sacked	29 November 2020	8th	(England) Lee Johnson	5 December 2020
Burton Albion	(England) Jake Buxton	Sacked	29 December 2020	24th	(Netherlands) Jimmy Floyd Hasselbaink	1 January 2021
Fleetwood Town	(England) Joey Barton	Sacked	4 January 2021	10th	(England) Simon Grayson	31 January 2021
AFC Wimbledon	(Wales) Glyn Hodges	Mutual consent	30 January 2021	21st	(England) Mark Robinson	17 February 2021
Bristol Rovers	(England) Paul Tisdale	Sacked	10 February 2021	20th	(England) Joey Barton	22 February 2021
Northampton Town	(England) Keith Curle	Sacked	10 February 2021	23rd	(Australia) Jon Brady	11 February 2021
Ipswich Town	(Scotland) Paul Lambert	Mutual consent	28 February 2021	8th	(England) Paul Cook	2 March 2020
Doncaster Rovers	(Jamaica) Darren Moore	Signed by Sheffield Wednesday	1 March 2021	6th	(England) Andy Butler (interim)	1 March 2021
Portsmouth	(Wales) Kenny Jackett	Sacked	14 March 2021	7th	(England) Danny Cowley	19 March 2021
Charlton Athletic	(England) Lee Bowyer	Resigned	15 March 2021	8th	(England) Nigel Adkins	18 March 2021
Swindon Town	(Republic of Ireland) John Sheridan	Resigned	18 April 2021	24th	(Scotland) Tommy Wright (interim)	18 April 2021

== League table ==
Pos	Team	Pld	W	D	L	GF	GA	GD	Pts	Promotion, qualification or relegation
1	Hull City (C, P)	46	27	8	11	80	38	+42	89	Promotion to the EFL Championship
2	Peterborough United (P)	46	26	9	11	83	46	+37	87	Promotion to the EFL Championship
3	Blackpool (O, P)	46	23	11	12	60	37	+23	80	Qualification for League One play-offs
4	Sunderland	46	20	17	9	70	42	+28	77	Qualification for League One play-offs
5	Lincoln City	46	22	11	13	69	50	+19	77	Qualification for League One play-offs
6	Oxford United	46	22	8	16	77	56	+21	74	Qualification for League One play-offs
7	Charlton Athletic	46	20	14	12	70	56	+14	74	
8	Portsmouth	46	21	9	16	65	51	+14	72	
9	Ipswich Town	46	19	12	15	46	46	0	69	
10	Gillingham	46	19	10	17	63	60	+3	67	
11	Accrington Stanley	46	18	13	15	63	68	−5	67	
12	Crewe Alexandra	46	18	12	16	56	61	−5	66	
13	Milton Keynes Dons	46	18	11	17	64	62	+2	65	
14	Doncaster Rovers	46	19	7	20	63	67	−4	64	
15	Fleetwood Town	46	16	12	18	49	46	+3	60	
16	Burton Albion	46	15	12	19	61	73	−12	57	
17	Shrewsbury Town	46	13	15	18	50	57	−7	54	
18	Plymouth Argyle	46	14	11	21	53	80	−27	53	
19	AFC Wimbledon	46	12	15	19	54	70	−16	51	
20	Wigan Athletic	46	13	9	24	54	77	−23	48	
21	Rochdale (R)	46	11	14	21	61	78	−17	47	Relegation to EFL League Two
22	Northampton Town (R)	46	11	12	23	41	67	−26	45	Relegation to EFL League Two
23	Swindon Town (R)	46	13	4	29	55	89	−34	43	Relegation to EFL League Two
24	Bristol Rovers (R)	46	10	8	28	40	70	−30	38	Relegation to EFL League Two

Source: EFL Official Website
Rules for classification: 1) Points; 2) Goal difference; 3) Number of goals scored; 4) Head-to-head results; 5) Wins; 6) Away goals; 7) Penalty points (sec 9.5); 8) 12-point sending off offences
(C) Champions; (O) Play-off winners; (P) Promoted; (R) Relegated

== Play-offs ==
Semi-finals
3	Blackpool	3	3	6
6	Oxford United	0	3	3
4	Sunderland	0	2	2
5	Lincoln City	2	1	3

Final
3	Blackpool	2
5	Lincoln City	1

First leg

18 May 2021
18:00

Oxford United	0–3	Blackpool
	Report	Turton 23'; Simms 26', 74'

Kassam Stadium, Oxford
Attendance: 3,224
Referee: Bobby Madley
19 May 2021
18:00

Lincoln City	2–0	Sunderland
Hopper 51'; Johnson 77'	Report

Sincil Bank, Lincoln
Attendance: 3,145
Referee: Craig Hicks

Second leg

21 May 2021
19:45

Blackpool	3–3	Oxford United
Embleton 11'; Dougall 13'; Yates 54'	Report	Taylor 7'; Atkinson 52'; Shodipo 74'

Bloomfield Road, Blackpool
Attendance: 4,000
Referee: Keith Stroud
22 May 2021
15:00

Sunderland	2–1	Lincoln City
Stewart 13'; Wyke 33'	Report	Hopper 56'

Stadium of Light, Sunderland
Attendance: 10,000
Referee: Michael Salisbury

Final

30 May 2021
15:00 BST

Blackpool	2–1	Lincoln City
Dougall 34', 54'	Report	Turton 1' (o.g.)

Wembley Stadium, London
Attendance: 9,751
Referee: Tony Harrington

== Results ==
Home \ Away	ACC	WIM	BLA	BRI	BRT	CHA	CRE	DON	FLE	GIL	HUL	IPS	LIN	MKD	NOR	OXF	PET	PLY	POR	ROC	SHR	SUN	SWI	WIG
Accrington Stanley	—	1–5	0–0	6–1	0–0	1–1	1–0	2–1	1–0	0–1	2–0	1–2	0–0	2–1	0–0	1–4	2–0	0–1	3–3	2–1	1–1	0–2	2–1	3–1
AFC Wimbledon	1–2	—	1–0	2–4	0–1	2–2	1–2	2–2	0–1	1–0	0–3	3–0	1–2	0–2	1–0	2–1	2–1	4–4	1–3	3–3	0–1	0–3	4–1	1–1
Blackpool	0–0	1–1	—	1–0	1–1	0–1	1–1	2–0	0–0	4–1	3–2	1–4	2–3	1–0	2–0	0–0	3–1	2–2	1–0	1–0	0–1	1–0	2–0	1–0
Bristol Rovers	4–1	0–0	2–1	—	1–1	0–1	0–1	2–1	1–4	0–2	1–3	0–2	0–1	0–2	2–0	0–2	0–2	3–0	3–1	1–2	2–1	0–1	0–1	1–2
Burton Albion	2–1	1–1	1–2	1–0	—	4–2	1–1	1–3	5–2	1–1	1–0	0–1	0–1	1–2	1–3	1–5	2–1	1–1	2–4	0–1	1–2	0–3	2–1	3–4
Charlton Athletic	0–2	5–2	0–3	3–2	1–2	—	2–2	1–3	3–2	2–3	1–0	0–0	3–1	0–1	2–1	2–0	0–1	2–2	1–3	4–4	1–1	0–0	2–2	1–0
Crewe Alexandra	2–0	1–1	1–1	3–2	0–3	0–2	—	1–0	1–1	0–1	1–2	1–1	0–1	2–0	2–1	0–6	2–0	2–1	0–0	1–1	3–2	2–2	4–2	3–0
Doncaster Rovers	0–1	2–0	3–2	4–1	0–3	0–1	1–2	—	0–1	2–1	3–3	4–1	1–0	1–1	0–0	3–2	1–4	2–1	2–1	1–0	0–1	1–1	2–1	1–4
Fleetwood Town	1–1	0–1	0–1	0–0	2–1	1–1	0–2	3–1	—	1–0	4–1	2–0	0–0	1–1	0–0	2–0	0–1	5–1	0–1	1–0	1–0	1–1	0–2	1–1
Gillingham	0–2	2–1	2–0	2–0	0–1	1–1	4–1	2–2	0–2	—	0–2	3–1	0–3	3–2	2–2	3–1	1–3	1–0	0–2	2–2	0–0	0–2	2–0	1–0
Hull City	3–0	1–0	1–1	2–0	2–0	2–0	1–0	2–1	2–1	1–1	—	0–1	0–0	0–1	3–0	2–0	1–2	1–0	0–2	2–0	0–1	2–2	1–0	3–1
Ipswich Town	2–0	0–0	2–0	2–1	2–1	0–2	1–0	2–1	3–1	1–0	0–3	—	1–1	0–0	0–0	0–0	0–1	1–0	0–2	2–0	2–1	0–1	2–3	2–0
Lincoln City	2–2	0–0	2–2	1–2	5–1	2–0	3–0	0–1	1–2	0–3	1–2	1–0	—	4–0	2–1	2–0	1–1	2–0	1–3	1–2	0–1	0–4	2–2	2–1
Milton Keynes Dons	3–2	1–1	0–1	2–0	1–1	0–1	0–2	1–0	3–1	2–0	1–3	1–1	1–2	—	4–3	1–1	1–1	2–1	1–0	0–3	2–2	2–2	5–0	2–0
Northampton Town	0–1	2–2	0–3	1–1	0–2	0–2	0–1	0–2	1–0	3–1	0–2	3–0	0–4	0–0	—	1–0	0–2	2–0	4–1	0–0	1–0	0–0	2–1	0–1
Oxford United	1–2	2–0	0–2	2–0	4–0	0–0	0–2	3–0	1–0	3–2	1–1	0–0	2–1	3–2	4–0	—	0–0	3–1	0–1	3–1	4–1	0–2	1–2	2–1
Peterborough United	7–0	3–0	1–2	0–0	2–2	2–1	2–0	2–2	2–1	0–1	1–3	2–1	3–3	3–0	3–1	2–0	—	1–0	1–0	4–1	5–1	1–1	3–1	2–1
Plymouth Argyle	2–2	1–0	1–0	2–0	2–0	0–6	1–1	2–1	1–0	1–0	0–3	1–2	4–3	1–0	2–1	2–3	0–3	—	2–2	0–4	1–1	1–3	4–2	0–2
Portsmouth	0–1	4–0	0–1	1–0	1–2	0–2	4–1	0–1	0–0	1–1	0–4	2–1	0–1	2–1	4–0	1–1	2–0	2–2	—	2–1	0–0	0–2	2–0	1–2
Rochdale	3–1	0–1	1–0	1–1	0–2	0–2	3–3	1–2	2–1	1–4	0–3	0–0	0–2	1–4	1–1	3–4	3–3	0–0	0–0	—	0–2	2–2	2–1	3–3
Shrewsbury Town	2–2	1–1	1–0	0–1	1–1	1–1	0–1	0–2	0–2	1–1	1–1	0–0	0–1	4–2	1–2	2–3	2–0	3–0	1–2	1–2	—	2–1	3–3	1–2
Sunderland	3–3	1–1	0–1	1–1	1–1	1–2	1–0	4–1	2–0	2–2	1–1	2–1	1–1	1–2	1–1	3–1	1–0	1–2	1–3	2–0	1–0	—	1–0	0–1
Swindon Town	0–3	0–1	0–2	1–0	4–2	2–2	2–1	1–2	0–1	1–3	2–1	1–2	0–1	1–4	2–1	1–2	0–3	0–2	3–1	3–1	0–1	0–2	—	1–0
Wigan Athletic	4–3	2–3	0–5	0–0	1–1	0–1	2–0	1–0	0–0	2–3	0–5	0–0	1–2	3–0	2–3	1–2	0–1	1–1	0–1	0–5	1–1	2–1	3–4	—

Updated to match(es) played on 9 May 2021. Source: https://www.bbc.co.uk/sport/football/league-one/table
Legend: Blue = home team win; Yellow = draw; Red = away team win.
For upcoming matches, an "a" indicates there is an article about the rivalry between the two participants.

== Season statistics ==
=== Top scorers ===
As of 9 May 2021

Rank	Player	Club	Goals
1	(Jamaica) Jonson Clarke-Harris	Peterborough United	31
2	(England) Charlie Wyke	Sunderland	25
3	(England) Joe Pigott	AFC Wimbledon	20
3	(England) Jerry Yates	Blackpool	20
5	(Northern Ireland) Dion Charles	Accrington Stanley	19
5	(England) Mallik Wilks	Hull City	19
7	(Northern Ireland) Josh Magennis	Hull City	18
7	(England) Matty Taylor	Oxford United	18
9	(England) Vadaine Oliver	Gillingham	17
10	(Wales) Luke Jephcott	Plymouth Argyle	16
10	(England) John Marquis	Portsmouth	16

=== Hat-tricks ===
As of 24 April 2021

Player	For	Against	Result	Date
(Republic of Ireland) Marcus Harness	Portsmouth	Burton Albion	2–4	30 October 2020
(Scotland) Siriki Dembélé	Peterborough United	Shrewsbury Town	5–1	31 October 2020
(England) Jonson Clarke-Harris	Peterborough United	Rochdale	4–1	12 December 2020
(Scotland) Kyle Joseph	Wigan Athletic	Burton Albion	4–3	29 December 2020
(England) Charlie Wyke	Sunderland	AFC Wimbledon	3–0	16 January 2021
(Republic of Ireland) Joe Mason	Milton Keynes Dons	Fleetwood Town	3–1	19 January 2021
(Northern Ireland) Dion Charles	Accrington Stanley	Bristol Rovers	6–1	2 February 2021
(England) Charlie Wyke	Sunderland	Doncaster Rovers	4–1	13 February 2021
(England) Mallik Wilks	Hull City	Wigan Athletic	5–0	17 February 2021
(England) Kane Hemmings	Burton Albion	Crewe Alexandra	3–0	13 March 2021
(Jamaica) Jonson Clarke-Harris	Peterborough United	Accrington Stanley	7–0	27 March 2021
(Northern Ireland) Will Grigg	Milton Keynes Dons	Swindon Town	5–0 (Note: Player scored 4 goals)	24 April 2021

== Awards ==
=== Monthly ===
Month	Manager of the Month		Player of the Month		Reference
September	(Scotland) Paul Lambert	Ipswich Town	(Spain) Madger Gomes	Doncaster Rovers	
October	(Scotland) Darren Ferguson	Peterborough United	(England) Ben Amos	Charlton	
November	(England) John Coleman	Accrington Stanley	(Northern Ireland) Callum Camps	Fleetwood Town	
December	(England) Steve Cotterill	Shrewsbury Town	(England) Owen Dale	Crewe Alexandra	
January	(Northern Ireland) Grant McCann	Hull City	(Northern Ireland) Matty Lund	Rochdale	
February	(Scotland) Darren Ferguson	Peterborough United	(Jamaica) Jonson Clarke-Harris	Peterborough United	
March	(Scotland) Steve Evans	Gillingham	(England) Vadaine Oliver	Gillingham	
April	(Northern Ireland) Grant McCann	Hull City	(Northern Ireland) Josh Magennis	Hull City	

=== Annual ===
Award	Winner	Club
Player of the Season	(Jamaica) Jonson Clarke-Harris	Peterborough United

EFL League One Team of the season

Pos.	Player	Club	Ref.
GK	(England) Lee Burge	Sunderland	
DF	(England) Luke O'Nien	Sunderland	
DF	(England) Robert Atkinson	Oxford United	
DF	(England) Mark Beevers	Peterborough United	
DF	(Australia) Callum Elder	Hull City	
MF	(England) Joe Ward	Peterborough United	
MF	(England) George Honeyman	Hull City	
MF	(England) Jorge Grant	Lincoln City	
FW	(Republic of Ireland) Aiden McGeady	Sunderland	
FW	(Jamaica) Jonson Clarke-Harris	Peterborough United	
FW	(England) Charlie Wyke	Sunderland	
Manager	(Northern Ireland) Grant McCann	Hull City	
