= 2020–21 Oxford United F.C. season =

English football club season

Oxford United
2020–21 season
- Chairman: Sumrith Thanakarnjanasuth
- Manager: Karl Robinson
- Stadium: Kassam Stadium
- League One: 6th
- FA Cup: First round
- EFL Cup: Second round
- EFL Trophy: Semi-finals
- Top goalscorer: Matty Taylor (18)
Home colours	Away colours

The 2020–21 season was Oxford United F.C.'s 127th year in existence and their fifth consecutive season in League One, the third tier of English football. As well as competing in League One, the club also participated in the FA Cup, EFL Cup and EFL Trophy. The season covers the period from 1 July 2020 to 30 June 2021.

Oxford finished 6th in League One but were defeated 6–3 on aggregate over two legs in the first round of the play-offs by Blackpool, who had finished 3rd and were ultimately promoted to the Championship. They were eliminated in the early rounds of the FA Cup and EFL Cup, but reached the semi-final of the EFL Trophy before being beaten by Tranmere Rovers.

== Transfers ==
=== Transfers in ===
Date	Position	Nationality	Name	From	Fee	Ref.
1 July 2020	CB	(England)	Benjamin Watt	(England) Tottenham Hotspur	Free transfer	
23 July 2020	LW	(Northern Ireland)	Joel Cooper	(Northern Ireland) Linfield	Undisclosed	
31 July 2020	CF	(England)	Matty Taylor	(England) Bristol City	Free transfer	
6 August 2020	CM	(England)	Sean Clare	(Scotland) Heart of Midlothian	Undisclosed	
18 August 2020	CF	(England)	Dylan Asonganyi	(England) Milton Keynes Dons	Free transfer	
21 August 2020	CF	(France)	Derick Osei	(France) Stade Brestois	Free transfer	
11 September 2020	CF	(England)	Sam Winnall	(England) Sheffield Wednesday	Free transfer	
9 November 2020	LB	(England)	Jordan Obita	(England) Reading	Free transfer	
29 January 2021	CB	(Republic of Ireland)	Luke McNally	(Republic of Ireland) St Patrick's Athletic	Undisclosed	

=== Loans in ===
Date from	Position	Nationality	Name	From	Date until	Ref.
15 August 2020	CM	(England)	Marcus McGuane	(England) Nottingham Forest	End of season	
21 August 2020	CM	(Republic of Ireland)	Liam Kelly	(Netherlands) Feyenoord	End of season	
16 October 2020	LW	(Republic of Ireland)	Olamide Shodipo	(England) Queens Park Rangers	End of season	
1 February 2021	LW	(England)	Brandon Barker	(Scotland) Rangers	End of season	
1 February 2021	CB	(England)	Joe Grayson	(England) Blackburn Rovers	End of season	
1 February 2021	CF	(England)	Elliot Lee	(England) Luton Town	End of season	

=== Loans out ===
Date from	Position	Nationality	Name	To	Date until	Ref.
2 October 2020	AM	(England)	Malachi Napa	(England) Woking	2 November 2020	
2 October 2020	FW	(England)	Slavi Spasov	(England) Woking	8 February 2021	
26 October 2020	RW	(England)	Kyran Lofthouse	(England) Woking	End of season	
11 December 2020	CM	(England)	Leon Chambers-Parillon	(England) Havant & Waterlooville	January 2021	
18 December 2020	LM	(Northern Ireland)	Joel Cooper	(Northern Ireland) Linfield	End of season	
12 January 2021	CM	(England)	Sean Clare	(England) Burton Albion	End of season	
22 January 2021	AM	(England)	Malachi Napa	(England) Woking	22 February 2021	
1 February 2021	CF	(France)	Derick Osei	(England) Walsall	End of season	
5 February 2021	DF	(Republic of Ireland)	Nico Jones	(England) Havant & Waterlooville	March 2021	

=== Transfers out ===
Date	Position	Nationality	Name	To	Fee	Ref.
1 July 2020	CB	(England)	Sam Allardyce	Unattached	Released	
1 July 2020	FW	(England)	Jordan Edwards	Unattached	Released	
1 July 2020	GK	(England)	Max Evans	(England) Yeovil Town	Released	
1 July 2020	MF	(England)	Aaron McCreadie	(England) Gosport Borough	Released	
1 July 2020	CB	(England)	Viktor Milton	Unattached	Released	
1 July 2020	RB	(Pakistan)	Kashif Siddiqi	Unattached	Released	
21 July 2020	CF	(Scotland)	Jamie Mackie	Retired		
12 August 2020	DM	(England)	George Thorne	Unattached	Released	
1 September 2020	CB	(England)	Robert Dickie	(England) Queens Park Rangers	Undisclosed (Note: Fee reported to be £2,430,000)	
3 September 2020	GK	(England)	Max Harris	(England) Cheltenham Town	Free transfer	
6 October 2020	LB	(England)	Kevin Berkoe	(England) Salford City	Free transfer	
29 January 2021	LB	(England)	Jordan Obita	(England) Wycombe Wanderers	Undisclosed	
25 March 2021	MF	(England)	Malachi Napa	(England) Woking	Free transfer	

== Pre-season ==
21 August 2020 Friendly	Oxford United	4–0	Woking F.C.	Oxford
	Sykes; Osei Yaw; Taylor; Ruffels	Report		Stadium: Oxford Sports Park

22 August 2020 Friendly	Oxford United	5–0	Banbury United F.C.	Oxford
	Agyei; Asonganyi; Osei Yaw; Ruffels	Report		Stadium: Oxford Sports Park

23 August 2020 Friendly	Oxford United	3–0	Oxford City F.C.	Oxford
	Taylor; Brannagan	Report		Stadium: Oxford Sports Park

25 August 2020 Friendly	Crystal Palace	2–1	Oxford United	Selhurst
17:30 BST	Zaha 51'; McArthur 54'	Report	Brannagan 12'	Stadium: Selhurst Park

29 August 2020 Friendly	Oxford United	1–0	Queens Park Rangers	Oxford
	Taylor 61'	Report		Stadium: Kassam Stadium; Referee: John Busby

1 September 2020 Friendly	Brentford	2–2	Oxford United	Brentford
	Canós 55' 72'	Report	Osei Yaw 83' 86'	Stadium: Brentford Community Stadium

== Competitions ==
=== EFL League One ===
==== League table ====
Pos	Team	Pld	W	D	L	GF	GA	GD	Pts	Promotion, qualification or relegation
2	Peterborough United (P)	46	26	9	11	83	46	+37	87	Promotion to the EFL Championship
3	Blackpool (O, P)	46	23	11	12	60	37	+23	80	Qualification for League One play-offs
4	Sunderland	46	20	17	9	70	42	+28	77	Qualification for League One play-offs
5	Lincoln City	46	22	11	13	69	50	+19	77	Qualification for League One play-offs
6	Oxford United	46	22	8	16	77	56	+21	74	Qualification for League One play-offs
7	Charlton Athletic	46	20	14	12	70	56	+14	74	
8	Portsmouth	46	21	9	16	65	51	+14	72	
9	Ipswich Town	46	19	12	15	46	46	0	69	
10	Gillingham	46	19	10	17	63	60	+3	67	

Source: EFL Official Website
Rules for classification: 1) Points; 2) Goal difference; 3) Number of goals scored; 4) Head-to-head results; 5) Wins; 6) Away goals; 7) Penalty points (sec 9.5); 8) 12-point sending off offences
(O) Play-off winners; (P) Promoted

==== Results summary ====
Overall								Home						Away					
Pld	W	D	L	GF	GA	GD	Pts	W	D	L	GF	GA	GD	W	D	L	GF	GA	GD
46	22	8	16	77	56	+21	74	13	4	6	39	21	+18	9	4	10	38	35	+3

Last updated: 9 May 2021.
Source: BBC

==== Results by matchday ====
Matchday	1	2	3	4	5	6	7	8	9	10	11	12	13	14	15	16	17	18	19	20	21	22	23	24	25	26	27	28	29	30	31	32	33	34	35	36	37	38	39	40	41	42	43	44	45	46
Ground	A	H	A	A	A	H	A	A	H	H	A	A	H	H	H	A	H	H	A	A	H	A	H	A	A	H	A	H	A	H	H	A	A	H	H	A	H	A	H	A	H	H	A	H	A	H
Result	L	L	W	L	L	W	L	L	W	L	W	D	L	D	D	D	W	W	W	W	W	W	W	L	W	W	D	L	D	D	D	W	L	W	L	L	W	L	L	W	W	W	L	W	W	W
Position	22	24	12	21	24	20	23	24	21	21	19	18	19	20	21	19	17	16	15	12	11	11	8	11	9	7	8	8	9	10	10	9	9	8	11	11	8	11	12	9	7	6	7	5	7	6

Updated to match(es) played on 9 May 2021. Source: 11v11 for league tables and fixtures
A = Away; H = Home; W = Win; D = Draw; L = Loss

==== Matches ====
Win Draw Loss Postponed

The 2020–21 season fixtures were released on 21 August.

12 September 2020 1	Lincoln City	2–0	Oxford United	Lincoln
15:00 BST	Scully 7'; Jackson 74'	Report	Clare (yellow card) 57'; Atkinson (yellow card) 77' ( (red card) 90+5' overturned on appeal)	Stadium: LNER Stadium; Attendance: 0 Referee: Andy Davies

19 September 2020 2	Oxford United	0–2	Sunderland	Oxford
15:00 BST	Kelly (yellow card) 41'	Report	Power (yellow card) 24'; O'Nien 47'; Gooch 82'	Stadium: Kassam Stadium; Attendance: 0 Referee: Darren Drysdale

26 September 2020 3	Accrington Stanley	1–4	Oxford United	Accrington
15:00 BST	Rodgers (yellow card) 44'; Hughes (yellow card) 55'; Cassidy 72' (pen.); Charles (red card) 75'; Pritchard (yellow card) 90'	Report	Henry 45'; Pritchard 73' (o.g.); Taylor 85' 87'	Stadium: Crown Ground; Attendance: 0 Referee: Ross Joyce

10 October 2020 4	Gillingham	3–1	Oxford United	Gillingham
13:00 BST	Oliver 18'; Mellis 22'; Drysdale (yellow card) 24'; Graham (yellow card) 63' (goal) 70'	Report	Agyei 48'	Stadium: Priestfield Stadium; Attendance: 0 Referee: Thomas Bramall

17 October 2020 5	Peterborough United	2–0	Oxford United	Peterborough
15:00 BST	Ward (yellow card) 27' (goal) 43'; Dembélé 65' (yellow card) 67'; Butler (yellow card) 88'	Report	Clare (yellow card) 23'; Henry (yellow card) 58'	Stadium: London Road Stadium; Attendance: 0 Referee: Carl Boyeson

20 October 2020 6	Oxford United	3–2	Milton Keynes Dons	Oxford
19:00 BST	Taylor 6' (yellow card) 82'; Henry (yellow card) 45+4'; Long 58'; Shodipo 88'	Report	Jerome 11'; Kasumu (yellow card) 19'; Houghton (yellow card) 37'; Lewington (yellow card) 74'; Gladwin 90+2'	Stadium: Kassam Stadium; Attendance: 0 Referee: Kevin Johnson

27 October 2020 7	Charlton Athletic	2–0	Oxford United	Charlton
19:00 GMT	Washington 32'; Shinnie 45+1'; Watson (yellow card) 47'; Inniss (yellow card) 61' (yellow-red card) 66'; Gunter (yellow card) 66'	Report	Rodríguez (yellow card) 25'; Taylor (yellow card) 62'; Moore (yellow card) 87'; Kelly (yellow card) 90+1'	Stadium: The Valley; Attendance: 0 Referee: Craig Hicks

31 October 2020 8	Fleetwood Town	2–0	Oxford United	Fleetwood
15:00 GMT	Camps 1'; Madden 76'; Duffy (yellow card) 90+4'	Report	Henry (penalty missed) 10'; Ruffels (yellow card) 53'; Long (yellow card) 87'	Stadium: Highbury Stadium; Attendance: 0 Referee: Robert Lewis

3 November 2020 9	Oxford United	3–1	Rochdale	Oxford
19:00 GMT	Moore 35', 82'; Shodipo 58'; Henry (yellow card) 72'; Clare (yellow card) 90+5'	Report	Lund 42' (pen.); Ryan (yellow card) 45'; Rathbone (yellow card) 56'	Stadium: Kassam Stadium; Attendance: 0 Referee: David Rock

17 November 2020 10	Oxford United	0–2	Crewe Alexandra	Oxford
19:00 GMT	Shodipo (yellow card) 67'; Clare (yellow card) 78'; Rodríguez (yellow card) 90'	Report	Mandron 28'; Offord (yellow card) 68'; Dale (yellow card) 79' (goal) 90+2'	Stadium: Kassam Stadium; Attendance: 0 Referee: Will Finnie

21 November 2020 11	Wigan Athletic	1–2	Oxford United	Wigan
15:00 GMT	James (yellow card) 82'; Aasgaard 89'; Merrie (yellow card) 90+3'	Report	Taylor 61'; Henry 86'; Rodríguez (yellow card) 90'	Stadium: DW Stadium; Attendance: 0 Referee: Paul Howard

24 November 2020 12	Portsmouth	1–1	Oxford United	Milton
19:00 GMT	Raggett 19' (yellow card) 90+1'; Cannon (yellow card) 73'	Report	Clare (yellow card) 52'; Rodríguez 69' (pen.); Taylor (yellow card) 90+2'	Stadium: Fratton Park; Attendance: 0 Referee: Tim Robinson

28 November 2020 13	Oxford United	1–2	Swindon Town	Oxford
15:00 GMT	Taylor 15'; Obita (yellow card) 64'; Sykes (yellow card) 77'; Eastwood (yellow card) 79'; Shodipo (yellow card) 84'; Long (yellow card) 90+5'	Report	Smith (yellow card) 23' (goal) 90+1'; Broadbent 85'; Grant (yellow card) 90+5'	Stadium: Kassam Stadium; Attendance: 0 Referee: Carl Boyeson

1 December 2020 14	Oxford United	0–0	Ipswich Town	Oxford
19:00 GMT		Report	Dozzell (yellow card) 85'	Stadium: Kassam Stadium; Attendance: 0 Referee: Bobby Madley

5 December 2020 15	Oxford United	1–1	Hull City	Oxford
15:00 GMT	Henry 10'; Rodríguez (yellow card) 38'; Obita (yellow card) 56'; McGuane (yellow card) 63'; Agyei (yellow card) 90'	Report	Docherty 68'	Stadium: Kassam Stadium; Attendance: 1,000; Referee: Andy Woolmer

12 December 2020 16	Blackpool	0–0	Oxford United	Blackpool
15:00 GMT		Report	Kelly (yellow card) 32'	Stadium: Bloomfield Road; Attendance: 0 Referee: Martin Coy

15 December 2020 17	Oxford United	4–0	Northampton Town	Oxford
19:45 GMT	Taylor 49', 89' (yellow card) 90+6'; Shodipo 65'; Kelly (yellow card) 72'; Agyei 90+3'	Report	Holmes (yellow card) 44'	Stadium: Kassam Stadium; Attendance: 2,000; Referee: Declan Bourne

26 December 2020 18	Oxford United	2–0	AFC Wimbledon	Oxford
15:00 GMT	Obita 13'; Taylor 22'; Rodríguez (yellow card) 50'; Agyei (yellow card) 83'	Report	Thomas (yellow card) 21'; Csóka (yellow card) 45+3'	Stadium: Kassam Stadium; Attendance: 0 Referee: Sam Purkiss

29 December 2020 19	Plymouth Argyle	2–3	Oxford United	Plymouth
19:45 GMT	Camará 12'; Jephcott (yellow card) 65' (goal) 84' (pen.); Macleod (yellow card) 80'	Report	Kelly (yellow card) 32'; Ruffels 37'; Long 74' (yellow card) 90+1'; Clare (yellow card) 79'; Shodipo 82' (pen.); Moore (yellow card) 83'	Stadium: Home Park; Attendance: 2,000; Referee: Kevin Johnson

2 January 2021 20	Burton Albion	1–5	Oxford United	Burton upon Trent
15:00 GMT	Quinn (yellow card) 5'; Hemmings 41'	Report	Taylor 9'; Shodipo 18', 31'; Ruffels 56', 63'	Stadium: Pirelli Stadium; Attendance: 0 Referee: Peter Wright

23 January 2021 21	Oxford United	2–0	Bristol Rovers	Oxford
15:00 GMT	Taylor 32', (yellow card) 60', (goal) 73'; Winnall (yellow card) 90+8'	Report	Leahy (yellow card) 27'; Grant (yellow card) 90+3'	Stadium: Kassam Stadium; Attendance: 0 Referee: David Rock

26 January 2021 22	Rochdale	3–4	Oxford United	Rochdale
19:00 GMT	Done (yellow card) 6' (goal) 22'; Humphrys 30' (yellow card) 77'; Rathbone (yellow card) 48'; Lund 64'	Report	Agyei 12'; Moore 49'; Brannagan (yellow card) 60'; Henry 62'; Shodipo 90+2'	Stadium: Spotland Stadium; Attendance: 0 Referee: Ross Joyce

30 January 2021 23	Oxford United	1–0	Fleetwood Town	Oxford
15:00 GMT	Ruffels 28'; Rodríguez (yellow card) 38'; Winnall (yellow card) 66'; Agyei (yellow card) 76'	Report	Mulgrew (red card) 6'; Andrew (yellow card) 82'	Stadium: Kassam Stadium; Attendance: 0 Referee: Sam Barrott

6 February 2021 24	Doncaster Rovers	3–2	Oxford United	Doncaster
15:00 GMT	Anderson (yellow card) 27'; Taylor 31'; Okenabirhie 47'; Richards 51'; Wright (yellow card) 81'	Report	Rodríguez (yellow card) 29'; Long 41'; Shodipo 70'; Moore (yellow card) 90+8'	Stadium: The Keepmoat Stadium; Attendance: 0 Referee: James Bell

9 February 2021 25	Bristol Rovers	0–2	Oxford United	Horfield
19:00 GMT	Ayunga (yellow card) 90'	Report	Lee 29'; Sykes (yellow card) 82'; Barker 90+2'; Brannagan (yellow card) 90+7'	Stadium: Memorial Stadium; Attendance: 0 Referee: Lee Swabey

14 February 2021 26	Oxford United	2–1	Wigan Athletic	Oxford
16:00 GMT	Winnall 72'; Moore 83'	Report	Lang 57'	Stadium: Kassam Stadium; Attendance: 0 Referee: Brett Huxtable

20 February 2021 27	Ipswich Town	0–0	Oxford United	Ipswich
15:00 GMT	Kenlock (yellow card) 76'	Report	Rodríguez (yellow card) 23'; Forde (yellow card) 48'; Winnall (yellow card) 90+4'	Stadium: Portman Road; Attendance: 0 Referee: Marc Edwards

23 February 2021 28	Oxford United	0–1	Portsmouth	Oxford
19:00 GMT	Brannagan (yellow card) 45+1'	Report	Curtis (yellow card) 14'; Harness (yellow card) 45+1'; White 48'	Stadium: Kassam Stadium; Attendance: 0 Referee: Graham Salisbury

27 February 2021 29	Milton Keynes Dons	1–1	Oxford United	Denbigh
15:00 GMT	Surman 13'; Mason (yellow card) 48'; Fisher (yellow card) 84'; Gladwin (yellow card) 90'; Laird (yellow card) 90+3'	Report	Lee 90+7'	Stadium: Stadium:mk; Attendance: 0 Referee: James Oldham

2 March 2021 30	Oxford United	0–0	Peterborough United	Oxford
19:00 GMT	Rodríguez (yellow card) 75'; Moore (yellow card) 77'	Report		Stadium: Kassam Stadium; Attendance: 0 Referee: Alan Young

6 March 2021 31	Oxford United	0–0	Charlton Athletic	Oxford
15:00 GMT		Report	Aneke (yellow card) 45+1'; Watson (yellow card) 71'	Stadium: Kassam Stadium; Attendance: 0 Referee: Tom Nield

9 March 2021 32	Swindon Town	1–2	Oxford United	Swindon
19:00 GMT	Lyden (yellow card) 9'; Thompson (yellow card) 33'; Conroy (yellow card) 51'; Pitman (penalty missed) 72'; Curran 90+2'	Report	Barker 3'; Sykes (yellow card) 34'; Forde (yellow card) 76'; Agyei 82', (yellow card) 88'	Stadium: The County Ground; Attendance: 0 Referee: Charles Breakspear

13 March 2021 33	Hull City	2–0	Oxford United	Kingston upon Hull
15:00 GMT	Lewis-Potter 22', 71'; Docherty (yellow card) 40'	Report		Stadium: KCOM Stadium; Attendance: 0 Referee: Anthony Backhouse

16 March 2021 34	Oxford United	3–0	Doncaster Rovers	Oxford
19:00 GMT	Taylor 19' 41'; Shodipo 45'; Hanson (yellow card) 72'; Stevens (yellow card) 86'	Report	Anderson (yellow card) 46'	Stadium: Kassam Stadium; Referee: Ben Toner

20 March 2021 35	Oxford United	0–2	Blackpool	Oxford
15:00 GMT	Brannagan (yellow card) 88'	Report	Dougall 16'; Ballard 42'; Garbutt (yellow card) 76'; Yates (yellow card) 90'	Stadium: Kassam Stadium; Referee: Peter Wright

23 March 2021 36	Northampton Town	1–0	Oxford United	Northampton
19:00 GMT	Hoskins (yellow card) 33', (goal) 55'	Report		Stadium: PTS Academy Stadium; Attendance: 0 Referee: Christopher Pollard

26 March 2021 37	Oxford United	2–1	Lincoln City	Oxford
19:45 GMT	Forde 29'; Stevens (yellow card) 43'; Hanson (yellow card) 45+4'; Taylor 57'	Report	Scully 4'; Edun (yellow card) 56'	Stadium: The Kassam Stadium; Attendance: 0 Referee: Scott Oldham

2 April 2021 38	Sunderland	3–1	Oxford United	Sunderland
15:00 BST	McLaughlin (yellow card) 19'; Gooch 45+2'; McGeady 81'; Stewart (yellow card) 89'; Power 90+4', (yellow card) 90+5'	Report	Henry 21', (yellow card) 54'; Sykes (yellow card) 25' (yellow-red card) 61'; Barker (yellow card) 25'; Moore (yellow card) 81'	Stadium: Stadium of Light; Attendance: 0 Referee: Trevor Kettle

5 April 2021 39	Oxford United	1–2	Accrington Stanley	Oxford
15:00 BST	Lee 25', (yellow card) 54'; Taylor (yellow card) 88'	Report	Smyth 16'; Butcher (yellow card) 58'; Nottingham 70'; Rodgers (yellow card) 87'	Stadium: The Kassam Stadium; Attendance: 0 Referee: Ollie Yates

10 April 2021 40	Crewe Alexandra	0–6	Oxford United	Crewe
15:00 BST	Beckles (yellow card) 87'	Report	Ruffels 36'; Henry 40'; Moore 45+2'; Barker 47'; Brannagan (penalty missed) 50', 50'; Winnall 84'	Stadium: Alexandra Stadium; Attendance: 0 Referee: Paul Howard

13 April 2021 41	Oxford United	4–1	Shrewsbury Town	Oxford
19:00 BST	Atkinson 13'; Lee 36'; Taylor 66'; Brannagan (yellow card) 74'; Long 77'	Report	Chapman 51'; Vela (yellow card) 64'; Norburn (yellow card) 74'	Stadium: The Kassam Stadium; Attendance: 0 Referee: Sam Purkiss

17 April 2021 42	Oxford United	3–2	Gillingham	Oxford
17:30 BST	Winnall 74'; Long 84', 90+3'; Taylor (yellow card) 90+6'	Report	Oliver 39'; Jackson (yellow card) 66'; Cundy 72'	Stadium: The Kassam Stadium; Attendance: 0 Referee: Robert Lewis

20 April 2021 43	AFC Wimbledon	2–1	Oxford United	Wimbledon
19:00 BST	Pigott (yellow card) 58', (goal) 62' (pen.); Woodyard 64'; Guinness-Walker (yellow card) 81'	Report	Ruffels 52'; Henry (red card) 62'	Stadium: Plough Lane; Attendance: 0 Referee: Andy Davies

24 April 2021 44	Oxford United	3–1	Plymouth Argyle	Oxford
15:00 BST	Edwards 29' (o.g.); Taylor 69', 80'	Report	Ennis 65'; Edwards (yellow card) 76'	Stadium: The Kassam Stadium; Attendance: 0 Referee: Brett Huxtable

1 May 2021 45	Shrewsbury Town	2–3	Oxford United	Shrewsbury
15:00 BST	Pennington 16'; Vela 25'; Walker (yellow card) 62'	Report	Lee 3'; Henry 68'; Agyei 85', (yellow card) 90+6'	Stadium: Montgomery Waters Meadow; Attendance: 0 Referee: Sam Barrott

9 May 2021 46	Oxford United	4–0	Burton Albion	Oxford
12:00 BST	Shodipo 10'; Taylor 28'; Lee 57'; Winnall 90+2'	Report	Mancienne (yellow card) 11'; Taylor (yellow card) 56'; Carter (yellow card) 79'	Stadium: The Kassam Stadium; Attendance: 0 Referee: Thomas Bramall

==== Play-offs ====
18 May 2021 Semi-final first leg	Oxford United	0–3	Blackpool	Oxford
18:00 BST		Report	Husband (yellow card) 3'; Turton 23'; Simms 26', 74'; Anderson (yellow card) 45'; Stewart (yellow card) 59'	Stadium: The Kassam Stadium; Attendance: 3,204; Referee: Bobby Madley

21 May 2021 Semi-final second leg	Blackpool	3–3 (6–3 agg.)	Oxford United	Blackpool
19:45 BST	Embleton 11'; Dougall 13'; Maxwell (yellow card) 40'; Yates 54'; Stewart (yellow card) 65'; Turton (yellow card) 90+2'	Report	Taylor 7', (yellow card) 55'; Brannagan (yellow card) 12'; Atkinson 52'; Shodipo 74'; Sykes (yellow card) 90+5'	Stadium: Bloomfield Road; Attendance: 4,000; Referee: Keith Stroud

=== FA Cup ===
The draw for the first round was made on Monday 26, October.

Win Draw Loss

7 November 2020 First round	Oxford United	1–2	Peterborough United	Oxford
15:00 GMT	Long (yellow card) 12'; Ruffels 45+2'; Shodipo (yellow card) 53'	Report	Dembélé 23'; Taylor 63'; Hamilton (yellow card) 75'	Stadium: Kassam Stadium; Attendance: 0 Referee: Ben Speedie

=== EFL Cup ===
Win Draw Loss

The first round draw was made on 18 August, live on Sky Sports, by Paul Merson. The draw for both the second and third round were confirmed on September 6, live on Sky Sports by Phil Babb.

5 September 2020 First round	Oxford United	1–1 (4–3 p)	AFC Wimbledon	Oxford
15:00 BST	Brannagan 63'	Report	Hartigan (yellow card) 61' (penalty missed) 84'; Taylor 67' (o.g.)	Stadium: The Kassam Stadium; Attendance: 0 Referee: Lee Swabey
	Penalties
	Forde (penalty scored); McGuane (penalty scored); Henry (penalty missed); Taylor (penalty scored); Brannagan (penalty scored)		O'Neill (penalty scored); Reilly (penalty missed); Guinness-Walker (penalty missed); Alexander (penalty scored); Pigott (penalty scored)

15 September 2020 Second round	Oxford United	1–1 (0–3 p)	Watford	Oxford
19:00 BST	Hall 26'	Report	Navarro (yellow card) 72'; Sema 89'	Stadium: Kassam Stadium; Attendance: 0 Referee: Leigh Doughty
	Penalties
	Forde (penalty missed); McGuane (penalty missed); Hall (penalty missed)		Sema (penalty scored); Quina (penalty scored); Perica (penalty scored)

=== EFL Trophy ===
Win Draw Loss

The regional group stage draw was confirmed on 18 August. The second round draw was made by Matt Murray on 20 November, at St Andrew's. The third round was made on 10 December 2020 by Jon Parkin. The draw for the semi-final was announced on 5 February.

Pos	Div	Team	Pld	W	PW	PL	L	GF	GA	GD	Pts	Qualification
1	L1	Oxford United	3	2	1	0	0	4	2	+2	8	Advance to Round 2
2	L1	Bristol Rovers	3	1	0	2	0	7	6	+1	5	Advance to Round 2
3	L2	Walsall	3	0	1	1	1	3	4	−1	3	
4	ACA	Chelsea U21	3	0	1	0	2	5	7	−2	2	

Source: EFL.com

8 September 2020 Group stage	Oxford United	2–1	Chelsea U21	Oxford
19:00 BST	Agyei 17'; Osei 45+2'	Report	Russell 53'	Stadium: The Kassam Stadium; Attendance: 0 Referee: Trevor Kettle

6 October 2020 Group stage	Oxford United	1–1 (4–3 p)	Bristol Rovers	Oxford
19:00 BST	Atkinson (yellow card) 52'; Brannagan (yellow card) 75'; Jones (yellow card) 85'; Osei 89'	Report	Mehew 12'; Baldwin (yellow card) 62'; Leahy (yellow card) 90+7'	Stadium: Kassam Stadium; Attendance: 0 Referee: Neil Hair
	Penalties
	Osei (penalty scored); Agyei (penalty missed); McGuane (penalty scored); Hall (penalty scored); Brannagan (penalty scored)		Leahy (penalty scored); Upson (penalty missed); Hare (penalty scored); Hargreaves (penalty scored); Baldwin (penalty missed)

10 November 2020 Group stage	Walsall	0–1	Oxford United	Bescot
19:00 GMT	Cockerill-Mollett (yellow card) 55'; Osadebe (yellow card) 76'	Report	Cooper (yellow card) 35'; Osei 87'	Stadium: Banks's Stadium; Attendance: 0 Referee: Carl Brook

8 December 2020 Second round	Oxford United	1–1 (4–1 p)	Forest Green Rovers	Oxford
19:45 GMT	Shodipo 64'	Report	Bailey 45+1'	Stadium: Kassam Stadium; Attendance: 1,036; Referee: Craig Hicks
	Penalties
	O'Donkor (penalty scored); Clare (penalty scored); Shodipo (penalty scored); Mousinho (penalty scored)		Collins (penalty missed); Bailey (penalty scored); Godwin-Malife (penalty missed)

12 January 2021 Third round	Oxford United	1–0	Cambridge United	Oxford
19:00 GMT	Hall 74'; Kelly (yellow card) 90+2'	Report	Davies (yellow card) 64'; Darling (yellow card) 73'	Stadium: Kassam Stadium; Attendance: 0 Referee: Charles Breakspear

2 February 2021 Quarter-finals	Oxford United	3–1	AFC Wimbledon	Oxford
19:00 GMT	Winnall 13', 29'; Shodipo 52'	Report	Chislett 78'; Longman (yellow card) 82'	Stadium: Kassam Stadium; Attendance: 0 Referee: Darren Drysdale

16 February 2021 Semi-finals	Oxford United	0–2	Tranmere Rovers	Oxford
18:00 GMT	Grayson (yellow card) 37'; Taylor (penalty missed) 50', (yellow card) 75'	Report	Macdonald (yellow card) 17'; Woolery 35'; Morris 66'; Feeney (yellow card) 90+1'	Stadium: The Kassam Stadium; Attendance: 0 Referee: Craig Hicks

=== Appearances and goals ===
As of 9 May 2021

No.	Pos	Nat	Player	Total		League One		FA Cup		League Cup		FL Trophy	
No.	Pos	Nat	Player	Apps	Goals	Apps	Goals	Apps	Goals	Apps	Goals	Apps	Goals
1	GK	(England) ENG	Simon Eastwood	18	0	13	0	0	0	1	0	4	0
2	DF	(Scotland) SCO	Sean Clare	20	0	10+7	0	0	0	1	0	2	0
3	DF	(England) ENG	Josh Ruffels	43	7	39	6	1	1	1	0	2	0
4	DF	(Republic of Ireland) IRL	Luke McNally	0	0	0	0	0	0	0	0	0	0
5	DF	(England) ENG	Elliott Moore	52	5	46	5	1	0	2	0	3	0
6	MF	(Spain) ESP	Alex Gorrin	38	1	27+7	1	0	0	1	0	2+1	0
7	FW	(England) ENG	Robert Hall	20	2	3+8	0	1	0	1	1	7	1
8	MF	(England) ENG	Cameron Brannagan	37	2	28+2	1	0	0	2	1	2+3	0
9	FW	(England) ENG	Matty Taylor	50	18	39+7	18	1	0	1	0	1+1	0
10	MF	(Northern Ireland) NIR	Mark Sykes	40	0	21+11	0	1	0	1	0	6	0
11	FW	(England) ENG	Sam Winnall	28	6	3+20	4	0+1	0	0	0	3+1	2
12	DF	(England) ENG	Sam Long	44	6	35+1	6	1	0	2	0	4+1	0
13	GK	(England) ENG	Jack Stevens	38	0	33	0	1	0	1	0	3	0
14	MF	(Republic of Ireland) IRL	Anthony Forde	41	1	16+17	1	1	0	1+1	0	4+1	0
15	DF	(England) ENG	John Mousinho	11	0	1+6	0	0	0	1	0	3	0
16	FW	(Northern Ireland) NIR	Joel Cooper	7	0	0+4	0	0+1	0	1	0	1	0
17	MF	(England) ENG	James Henry	41	7	34+3	7	0	0	1	0	2+1	0
18	MF	(England) ENG	Marcus McGuane	21	0	13+2	0	1	0	1+1	0	1+2	0
19	FW	(England) ENG	Dan Agyei	45	6	11+28	5	0	0	1	0	3+2	1
20	DF	(England) ENG	Jamie Hanson	29	0	9+15	0	0	0	0	0	4+1	0
21	MF	(England) ENG	Malachi Napa	1	0	0	0	0	0	0	0	0+1	0
22	DF	(England) ENG	Rob Atkinson	39	1	36	1	0	0	1	0	1+1	0
23	FW	(England) ENG	Dylan Asonganyi	1	0	0	0	1	0	0	0	0	0
24	DF	(England) ENG	Jordan Obita	15	1	6+6	1	1	0	0	0	2	0
24	DF	(England) ENG	Joe Grayson	4	0	1+2	0	0	0	0	0	1	0
25	FW	(Republic of Ireland) IRL	Olamide Shodipo	44	12	24+15	10	1	0	0	0	3+1	2
27	FW	(England) ENG	Elliot Lee	18	5	15+3	5	0	0	0	0	0	0
28	MF	(Republic of Ireland) IRL	Liam Kelly	33	0	19+5	0	1	0	0+2	0	4+2	0
29	FW	(France) FRA	Derick Osei Yaw	10	3	1+2	0	0	0	1+1	0	3+2	3
30	MF	(England) ENG	Brandon Barker	20	3	14+5	3	0	0	0	0	0+1	0
32	FW	(England) ENG	Kyran Lofthouse	2	0	0	0	0	0	0+1	0	1	0
33	DF	(England) ENG	Michael Elechi	2	0	0	0	0	0	0	0	2	0
35	DF	(Republic of Ireland) IRL	Nico Jones	4	0	0	0	0	0	0	0	3+1	0
38	DF	(England) ENG	Leon Chambers-Parillon	5	0	0+3	0	0	0	0	0	0+2	0
49	FW	(England) ENG	Gatlin O'Donkor	1	0	0	0	0	0	0	0	0+1	0

== Top scorers ==
As of 9 May 2021

Place	Position	Nation	Number	Name	League One	FA Cup	League Cup	FL Trophy	Total
1	FW	(England)	9	Matty Taylor	18	0	0	0	18
2	FW	(Republic of Ireland)	25	Olamide Shodipo	10	0	0	2	12
3=	MF	(England)	3	Josh Ruffles	6	1	0	0	7
3=	MF	(England)	10	James Henry	7	0	0	0	7
5=	DF	(England)	12	Sam Long	6	0	0	0	6
5=	FW	(England)	11	Sam Winnall	4	0	0	2	6
5=	FW	(England)	19	Dan Agyei	5	0	0	1	6
8=	DF	(England)	5	Elliott Moore	5	0	0	0	5
8=	FW	(England)	27	Elliot Lee	5	0	0	0	5
10=	FW	(France)	29	Derick Osei Yaw	0	0	0	3	3
10=	MF	(England)	30	Brandon Barker	3	0	0	0	3
12=	MF	(England)	7	Rob Hall	0	0	1	1	2
12=	MF	(England)	8	Cameron Brannagan	1	0	1	0	2
12=	Own goal				2	0	0	0	2
15=	MF	(Spain)	6	Alex Gorrin	1	0	0	0	1
15=	MF	(Republic of Ireland)	14	Anthony Forde	1	0	0	0	1
15=	DF	(England)	22	Rob Atkinson	1	0	0	0	1
15=	DF	(England)	24	Jordan Obita	1	0	0	0	1
TOTALS					79	1	2	9	89

=== Disciplinary record ===
As of 9 May 2021

Number	Nation	Position	Name	League One		FA Cup		League Cup		FL Trophy		Total	
Number	Nation	Position	Name	Booked	Sent off (straight red)	Booked	Sent off (straight red)	Booked	Sent off (straight red)	Booked	Sent off (straight red)	Booked	Sent off (straight red)
1	(England)	GK	Simon Eastwood	1	0	0	0	0	0	0	0	1	0
2	(Scotland)	DF	Sean Clare	6	0	0	0	0	0	0	0	6	0
5	(England)	DF	Josh Ruffels	1	0	0	0	0	0	0	0	1	0
5	(England)	DF	Elliott Moore	5	0	0	0	0	0	0	0	5	0
6	(England)	MF	Alex Gorrin	9	0	0	0	0	0	0	0	9	0
8	(England)	MF	Cameron Brannagan	5	0	0	0	0	0	1	0	6	0
9	(England)	FW	Matty Taylor	6	0	0	0	0	0	1	0	7	0
10	(Northern Ireland)	MF	Mark Sykes	4	1	0	0	0	0	0	0	4	1
11	(England)	FW	Sam Winnall	3	0	0	0	0	0	0	0	3	0
12	(England)	DF	Sam Long	3	0	1	0	0	0	0	0	3	0
13	(England)	GK	Sam Long	3	0	1	0	0	0	0	0	3	0
14	(Republic of Ireland)	MF	Jack Stevens	2	0	0	0	0	0	0	0	2	0
16	(Northern Ireland)	FW	Joel Cooper	0	0	0	0	0	0	0	0	1	0
17	(England)	MF	James Henry	4	1	0	0	0	0	0	0	4	1
18	(England)	MF	Marcus McGuane	1	0	0	0	0	0	0	0	1	0
19	(England)	MF	Dan Agyei	5	0	0	0	0	0	0	0	5	0
20	(England)	DF	Jamie Hanson	2	0	0	0	0	0	0	0	2	0
22	(England)	DF	Rob Atkinson	1	0	0	0	0	0	1	0	2	0
24	(England)	DF	Jordan Obita	2	0	0	0	0	0	0	0	2	0
24	(England)	DF	Joe Grayson	0	0	0	0	0	0	1	0	1	0
25	(Republic of Ireland)	FW	Olamide Shodipo	2	0	1	0	0	0	0	0	3	0
27	(England)	FW	Elliot Lee	1	0	0	0	0	0	0	0	1	0
28	(Republic of Ireland)	MF	Liam Kelly	5	0	0	0	0	0	1	0	6	0
30	(England)	MF	Brandon Barker	1	0	0	0	0	0	0	0	1	0
35	(Republic of Ireland)	DF	Nico Jones	0	0	0	0	0	0	1	0	1	0
TOTALS				70	2	2	0	0	0	7	0	79	2
