= Brandon Barker =

English footballer (born 1996)

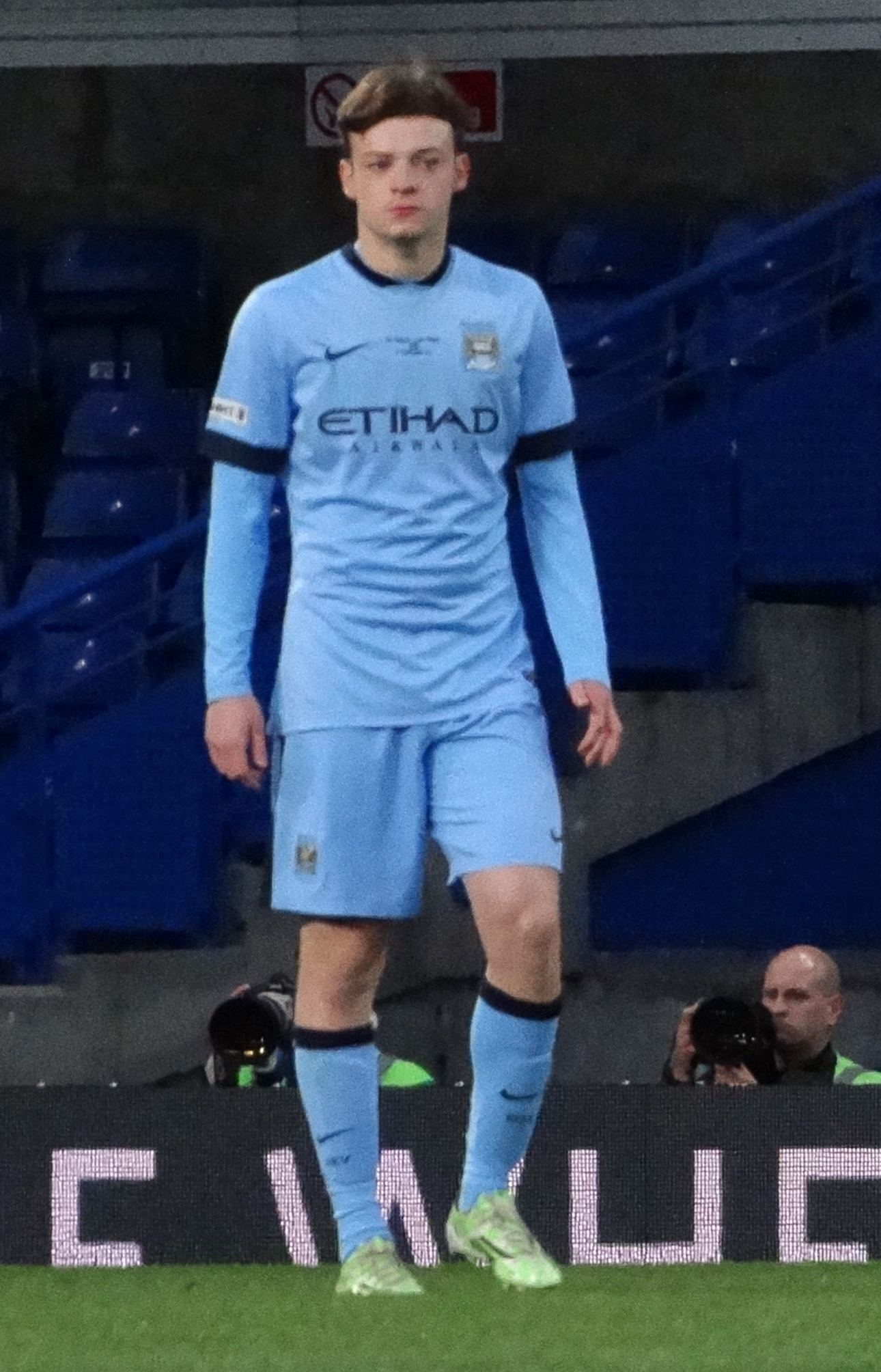
- Barker with Manchester City in 2015

Personal information
- Full name: Brandon Lee Colin Barker
- Date of birth: 4 October 1996 (age 30)
- Place of birth: Manchester, England
- Height: 5 ft 9 in (1.75 m)
- Position: Winger

Youth career
- 2004–2015: Manchester City

Senior career*
Years	Team	Apps	(Gls)
2015–2019	Manchester City	0	(0)
2015	→ Rotherham United (loan)	4	(1)
2016–2017	→ NAC Breda (loan)	22	(2)
2017–2018	→ Hibernian (loan)	27	(2)
2018–2019	→ Preston North End (loan)	16	(0)
2019–2022	Rangers	16	(3)
2021	→ Oxford United (loan)	19	(3)
2022	Reading	4	(0)
2022–2023	Omonia	17	(1)
2024	Morecambe	2	(0)
2025	Avro	9	(0)
2025	Kettering Town	4	(0)

International career
2013–2014	England U18	4	(0)
2014	England U19	5	(3)
2015–2016	England U20	8	(3)
- * Club domestic league appearances and goals as of 15:24, 14 October 2025 (UTC)

Brandon Lee Colin Barker (born 4 October 1996) is an English professional footballer who plays as a left sided winger.

Barker has previously played for Manchester City, Rotherham United, NAC Breda, Hibernian, Preston North End, Reading and Oxford United and Rangers. He has also represented England at the under-18, under-19 and under-20 international levels.

== Club career ==
=== Manchester City ===
Barker joined the Manchester City academy at the age of eight. He was the winner of the Academy Players' Player of the Year award in the 2013–14 season and signed his first professional contract with Manchester City in July 2014. In the opening months of the 2015–16 season he appeared on the first team bench for a number of times but did not manage to make an appearance. Barker made his first-team debut for City on 21 February 2016, coming on as a substitute for Bersant Celina in a 5–1 defeat against Chelsea in the fifth round of the FA Cup.

On 6 November 2015, Barker signed for Rotherham United of the Championship on a loan with an initial length of two months. The next day he made his professional debut, playing 90 minutes and scoring in a 5–2 loss to Ipswich. On 15 December 2015, Barker was recalled from his loan by Manchester City.

In August 2016, Barker was sent to NAC Breda of the Dutch Eerste Divisie on loan for the 2016-17 season. He made his debut on 19 August, as a substitute in a 2–1 loss to Maastricht. His first goal came on 21 October, in a 3–1 win over Fortuna Sittard.

On 17 August 2017, Barker was loaned to Scottish Premiership side Hibernian for the 2017–18 season. Barker said in November that he had been encouraged to move to Scotland by the example of Patrick Roberts, a winger who had moved on loan from Manchester City to Celtic. Barker scored his first goal for Hibs in a 2–1 win against Motherwell on 31 January, but then suffered a torn hamstring in his next match. Towards the end of the season, Barker said he expected to be loaned out again by Manchester City and that he would be interested in returning to Hibs.

Barker joined Preston North End on loan for the 2018–19 season. Barker's first goal for Preston North End came in a 3–1 win over Morecambe in the EFL Cup on 14 August 2018.

=== Rangers ===
Barker signed for Rangers in August 2019. He scored his first goal for the club in his league debut at Ibrox against Livingston on 14 September 2019, scoring the third goal in a 3–1 victory. On 31 January 2022, Barker departed Rangers by mutual consent.

==== Oxford United (loan) ====
Barker joined Oxford United on loan until the end of the season on 1 February 2021. He scored three league goals for United during the 2020–21 season; his goal against Crewe on 10 April 2021 was voted the club's Goal of the Season.

=== Reading ===
On 15 February 2022, Barker joined EFL Championship side Reading on a short-term deal until the end of the 2021–22 season. On 20 May, Reading confirmed that Barker would leave the club upon the expiration of his contract.

=== Omonia ===
On 30 June 2022, Barker joined Cypriot club Omonia. Despite scoring in the first game he started for the club in the Europa League qualifiers, after manager Neil Lennon's sacking, Barker failed to impress Omonia's new coach and was dropped from the squad. He was released in August 2023.

=== Morecambe ===
In January 2024, Barker returned to England, joining League Two club Morecambe on a short-term contract until the end of the season.

=== Non-League ===
On 21 February 2025, Barker joined Northern Premier League Division One West club Avro.

In August 2025, he joined Southern League Premier Division Central club Kettering Town. He departed the club in October 2025.

== International career ==
Barker made his international debut for England under-18 in October 2013 and went on to play for his country at under-19 and under-20 levels.

== Career statistics ==
As of 14 October 2025

Appearances and goals by club, season and competition
Club	Season	League			Domestic Cup		League Cup		Other		Total	
Club	Season	Division	Apps	Goals	Apps	Goals	Apps	Goals	Apps	Goals	Apps	Goals
Manchester City	2015–16	Premier League	—		1	0	—		—		1	0
Rotherham United (loan)	2015–16	Championship	4	1	—		—		—		4	1
NAC Breda (loan)	2016–17	Eerste Divisie	22	2	1	0	—		—		23	2
Hibernian (loan)	2017–18	Scottish Premiership	27	2	1	0	2	0	—		30	2
Preston North End (loan)	2018–19	Championship	16	0	1	0	3	2	—		20	2
Rangers	2019–20	Scottish Premiership	6	1	1	0	2	0	4 (Note: Appearances and goals in the UEFA Europa League)	0	13	1
Rangers	2020–21	Scottish Premiership	10	2	0	0	1	0	2	0	13	2
Rangers	2021–22	Scottish Premiership	0	0	1	0	0	0	0	0	1	0
Rangers	Total		16	3	2	0	3	0	6	0	27	3
Oxford United (loan)	2020–21	League One	19	3	0	0	0	0	3 (Note: Appearance in EFL Trophy and two appearances in the EFL League One play-offs)	0	22	3
Reading	2021–22	Championship	4	0	0	0	0	0	—		4	0
Omonia	2022–23	Cyta Championship	17	1	1	0	—		7 (Note: Includes appearance in the Cypriot Super Cup and appearances in the UEFA Europa League)	1	25	1
Morecambe	2023–24	League Two	2	0	0	0	0	0	0	0	2	0
Avro	2024–25	Northern Premier League Division One West	9	0	—		—		0	0	9	0
Kettering Town	2025–26	Southern League Premier Division Central	4	0	1	0	—		0	0	5	0
Career total			140	12	8	0	8	2	16	1	172	15

== Honours ==
Rangers

- Scottish Premiership: 2020–21

Omonia

- Cypriot Cup: 2022–23

Individual

- Manchester City EDS Player of the Year: 2013–14
