= Derick Osei =

French footballer (born 1998)

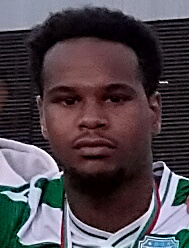

Personal information
- Full name: Derick Osei Yaw
- Date of birth: 10 September 1998 (age 28)
- Place of birth: Toulouse, France
- Height: 1.88 m (6 ft 2 in)
- Position: Forward

Youth career
- 2004–2008: Toulouse Mirail
- 2008–2018: Toulouse

Senior career*
Years	Team	Apps	(Gls)
2016–2019	Toulouse II	51	(15)
2019–2020	Brest II	7	(2)
2019–2020	Brest	3	(0)
2020	→ Béziers (loan)	7	(1)
2020–2021	Oxford United	3	(0)
2021	→ Walsall (loan)	11	(0)
2022	AFC Wimbledon	6	(0)
2022–2023	Dundee	6	(1)
2024	Nîmes	2	(0)
2025	Cherno More	12	(1)

International career
2016–2017	France U19	6	(1)
2017–2018	France U20	3	(0)
- * Club domestic league appearances and goals as of 27 May 2025

Derick Osei Yaw (born 10 September 1998) is a French professional footballer who plays as a striker.

== Early life ==
Derick Osei Yaw was born in Toulouse, in the South of France, to Ghanaian parents. His father was born in Kumasi and his mother in Accra. He acquired French nationality on 11 January 1999 through the collective effect of his parents' naturalization.

== Club career ==
=== Early career ===
On 30 January 2019, Osei signed for Stade Brestois 29 on a two-year contract, joining from Toulouse FC. He made his professional debut for Brest in a 1–1 Ligue 2 tie with Gazélec Ajaccio on 15 February 2019.

On 2 July 2020, he left the French club.

=== Oxford United ===
On 21 August 2020, Osei Yaw signed with English club Oxford United on a two-year contract. He made his debut for the club on 5 September as a late substitute in an EFL Cup tie against AFC Wimbledon, which Oxford won 4–3 on penalties after the game finished 1–1. On 8 September, he scored his first goal for the club in a 2–1 win over Chelsea U21s in an EFL Trophy tie, and on 10 November 2020 he scored the winning goal as Oxford beat League Two side Walsall 0–1 to go through to the knockout stages of the same competition. On 1 February 2021, Osei Yaw joined Walsall on loan for the remainder of the 2020–21 season. On 2 September 2021, Osei Yaw left Oxford by mutual consent.

=== AFC Wimbledon ===
On 19 March 2022, Osei signed for EFL League One side AFC Wimbledon on a short-term contract until the end of the 2021–2022 season. He departed the Dons at the end of the season.

=== Dundee ===
On 6 October 2022, Osei signed for Scottish Championship side Dundee until the end of the season. Osei made his debut off the bench in a Scottish League Cup game against Rangers. Osei scored his first goal for the Dark Blues on 28 October, scoring a late equaliser against Queen's Park. He would net two goals coming off the bench in a 6–2 Scottish Cup win over Airdrieonians the following month. On 16 January 2023, Osei left Dundee after the club activated a break clause in his contract.

=== Nîmes Olympique ===
On 21 August 2024, Osei returned to French football with Championnat National club Nîmes Olympique. Osei made his debut for Les Crocodiles off the bench on 30 August, in a league defeat away to Valenciennes. In November 2024, it was reported that Osei's deal with Nîmes had ended after playing 4 games for the club.

=== Cherno More Varna ===
On 28 February 2025, Osei joined Bulgarian First League side PFC Cherno More Varna on a short-term deal until the end of the season. On 15 March, Osei made his debut for The Sailors as a substitute in an away draw against CSKA Sofia. On 19 April, Osei scored his first goal for Cherno More in a league draw at home to PFC Beroe Stara Zagora.

== International career ==
Osei Yaw is a youth international for France, and represented the U20s at the 2017 Toulon Tournament.

== Career statistics ==
As of 26 May 2025

Club	Season	League			National Cup		League Cup		Other		Total	
Club	Season	Division	Apps	Goals	Apps	Goals	Apps	Goals	Apps	Goals	Apps	Goals
Brest	2018–19	Ligue 2	3	0	0	0	0	0	—		3	0
Brest	2019–20	Ligue 1	0	0	0	0	0	0	—		0	0
Brest	Total		3	0	0	0	0	0	0	0	3	0
AS Béziers (loan)	2019–20	Championnat National	7	0	0	0	0	0	—		7	0
Oxford United	2020–21	EFL League One	3	0	0	0	2	0	5 (Note: Appearance(s) in the Football League Trophy)	3	10	3
Walsall (loan)	2020–21	EFL League Two	11	0	0	0	0	0	0	0	11	0
AFC Wimbledon	2021–22	EFL League One	6	0	0	0	0	0	0	0	6	0
Dundee	2022–23	Scottish Championship	6	1	1	2	1	0	1 (Note: Appearances in the Scottish Challenge Cup)	0	9	3
Nîmes	2024–25	Championnat National	2	0	2	0	0	0	0	0	4	0
Cherno More Varna	2024–25	Bulgarian First League	12	1	2	0	—		0	0	14	1
Career total			50	2	5	2	3	0	6	3	64	7
