= Dylan Asonganyi =

English footballer

Personal information
- Full name: Dylan Defang Asonganyi
- Date of birth: 10 December 2000 (age 25)
- Place of birth: Sheffield, England
- Position: Forward

Youth career
- –2017: Milton Keynes Dons

Senior career*
Years	Team	Apps	(Gls)
2017–2020	Milton Keynes Dons	6	(0)
2020	→ Maidenhead United (loan)	1	(0)
2020–2021	Oxford United	0	(0)
2020–2021	→ Chelmsford City (loan)	7	(0)
2021–2022	Maidenhead United	8	(0)
2022	→ Kings Langley (loan)	3	(0)
2022	Cambridge City	3	(0)
2023–2024	Cranfield United	12	(0)
2024	Biggleswade	2	(0)
- * Club domestic league appearances and goals as of 08:10, 11 August 2024 (UTC)

Dylan Defang Asonganyi (born 10 December 2000) is an English professional footballer who plays as a forward.

== Club career ==
=== Milton Keynes Dons ===
Asonganyi joined Milton Keynes Dons' academy at a young age, progressing through various age groups and into the club's development squad. Following a productive start to the 2017–18 season with the club's under-18 team, in which he scored 9 goals in 7 appearances, Asonganyi was reportedly gaining interest from Premier League clubs including Arsenal, Liverpool and Manchester United. As a 16-year-old, he was named as a substitute for the first team in a 0–0 EFL Trophy group stage fixture against Stevenage on 3 October 2017.

On 30 December 2017, Asonganyi signed professional terms with the club, signing a two-and-a-half-year deal. After missing the latter half of the 2017–18 season through injury, Asonganyi made his professional debut on 11 August 2018, being named in the starting lineup in a 1–0 home league victory over Bury. Three days later, Asonganyi scored his first professional goal for the club in a 3–0 EFL Cup first round home win over Charlton Athletic. Asonganyi joined Maidenhead United on loan on 13 March 2020. He played a single game before his loan was cut short due to the COVID-19 pandemic. Following the conclusion of the 2019–20 season, Asonganyi was one of nine players released by Milton Keynes Dons.

=== Oxford United ===
On 18 August 2020, Asonganyi joined League One club Oxford United following a successful trial. On 3 December 2020, Asonganyi joined National League South club Chelmsford City on a one-month loan. On 3 February 2021, the loan was extended to the end of the 2020–21 season. He was released by Oxford at the end of the 2020–21 season.

=== Non-league ===
Asonganyi joined Maidenhead for the 2021–22 season. He joined Kings Langley on loan in February 2022. He left the Magpies at the end of the 2021–22 season after eight appearances.

In August 2022 he joined Cambridge City.

== Club statistics ==
As of 5 December 2023.

Appearances and goals by club, season and competition
Club	Season	League			FA Cup		League Cup		Other		Total	
Club	Season	Division	Apps	Goals	Apps	Goals	Apps	Goals	Apps	Goals	Apps	Goals
Milton Keynes Dons	2017–18	League One	0	0	0	0	0	0	0	0	0	0
Milton Keynes Dons	2018–19	League Two	3	0	0	0	1	1	0	0	4	1
Milton Keynes Dons	2019–20	League One	3	0	0	0	1	0	2 (Note: Appearance(s) in the Football League Trophy)	0	6	0
Milton Keynes Dons	Total		6	0	0	0	2	1	2	0	10	1
Maidenhead United (loan)	2019–20	National League	1	0	0	0	—		0	0	1	0
Oxford United	2020–21	League One	0	0	1	0	0	0	0	0	1	0
Chelmsford City (loan)	2020–21	National League South	7	0	0	0	—		1 (Note: Appearance(s) in the FA Trophy)	1	8	1
Maidenhead United	2021–22	National League	8	0	2	0	—		0	0	10	0
Kings Langley (loan)	2021–22	SFL Premier Division South	3	0	0	0	—		0	0	3	0
Cambridge City	2022–23	NPL Division One Midlands	3	0	0	0	—		1	0	4	0
Cranfield United	2023–24	SSML Division One	10	0	0	0	—		3 (Note: Two appearances and one goal in Bedfordshire Senior Trophy, one appearance in SSML Challenge Trophy)	1	13	1
Career total			38	0	3	0	2	1	7	2	50	3
