= Robert Atkinson (footballer, born 1998) =

English footballer

Personal information
- Full name: Robert Philip Atkinson
- Date of birth: 13 July 1998 (age 28)
- Place of birth: Chesterfield, England
- Height: 6 ft 4 in (1.93 m)
- Position: Defender

Team information
- Current team: Bristol City
- Number: 5

Youth career
- Cannes

Senior career*
Years	Team	Apps	(Gls)
2016–2017	Basingstoke Town	30	(2)
2017–2019	Fulham	0	(0)
2019	→ Braintree Town (loan)	15	(0)
2019–2020	Eastleigh	20	(1)
2020–2021	Oxford United	39	(1)
2020	→ Eastleigh (loan)	4	(0)
2021–	Bristol City	85	(9)
2025	→ Portsmouth (loan)	14	(2)
- * Club domestic league appearances and goals as of 20:58, 2 May 2026 (UTC)

Robert Philip Atkinson (born 13 July 1998) is an English professional footballer who plays as a defender for EFL Championship side Bristol City.

After playing youth football with AS Cannes, he started his senior career with Basingstoke Town in 2016, before signing for Fulham in 2017. He had a loan spell with Braintree Town in 2019, and joined Eastleigh on a permanent basis later that year. He joined Oxford United in January 2020, and Bristol City in July 2021.

== Club career ==
Atkinson was born in Chesterfield, and spent much of his youth in France, playing for the academy of AS Cannes. He played for Knaphill U18s and first team before starting his senior football career at Basingstoke Town in the 2016–17 season, where he made thirty league appearances, scoring twice. He joined Fulham in September 2017 for a fee of £30,000 after a trial period with the club; he initially played for the club's under-23 side. He joined Braintree Town on loan in January 2019, and made 15 appearances for the club.

In June 2019, he signed for National League side Eastleigh, making 24 appearances in total for the Spitfires and impressing with the National League side.

=== Oxford United ===
In January 2020, he signed for League One side Oxford United for an undisclosed fee on a three-and-a-half-year contract, though he returned to Eastleigh on loan until the end of the season as part of the deal. He was recalled by Oxford United in February 2020 as a result of an injury to John Mousinho and a suspension for Robert Dickie. He made his professional debut on 5 October 2020, in a 1–1 EFL Cup draw with AFC Wimbledon, in which Oxford won on penalties. He scored his first league goal, and his first goal for Oxford, in a 4–1 home victory over Shrewsbury Town on 13 April 2021. Atkinson had a successful 2020–21 season, scoring once in 39 league appearances as the club finished 6th, qualifying for the play-offs, with Atkinson named in the EFL League One Team of the Season. Despite a goal for Atkinson in the play-off semi-final second leg against Blackpool, the club were eliminated from the play-offs after a 6–3 aggregate defeat.

=== Bristol City ===
Atkinson signed for Bristol City for an undisclosed seven-figure fee in July 2021. On 28 April 2023, it was announced that Atkinson had signed a new three-year deal with Bristol City.

On 3 January 2025, Atkinson joined Portsmouth on loan until the 31 May 2025.

On 23 June 2025 Atkinson signed a contract extension with Bristol City until 2028.

== Career statistics ==
As of end of 2025–26 season

Appearances and goals by club, season and competition
Club	Season	League			FA Cup		League Cup		Other		Total	
Club	Season	Division	Apps	Goals	Apps	Goals	Apps	Goals	Apps	Goals	Apps	Goals
Basingstoke Town	2016–17	Southern League Premier Division	30	2	2	0	—		7 (Note: 3 appearances in FA Trophy, 1 appearance in Southern League Cup and 3 appearances in Hampshire Senior Cup)	0	39	2
Fulham	2017–18	Championship	0	0	0	0	0	0	0	0	0	0
Fulham	2018–19	Premier League	0	0	0	0	0	0	—		0	0
Fulham	Total		0	0	0	0	0	0	0	0	0	0
Braintree Town (loan)	2018–19	National League	15	0	0	0	—		0	0	15	0
Eastleigh	2019–20	National League	20	1	6	0	—		0	0	26	1
Oxford United	2019–20	League One	0	0	0	0	0	0	0	0	0	0
Oxford United	2020–21	League One	39	1	0	0	1	0	4 (Note: 2 appearances in EFL Trophy, 2 appearances and 1 goal in League One play-offs)	1	44	2
Oxford United	Total		39	1	0	0	1	0	4	1	44	2
Eastleigh (loan)	2019–20	National League	4	0	0	0	—		0	0	4	0
Bristol City	2021–22	Championship	34	2	1	0	0	0	—		35	2
Bristol City	2022–23	Championship	26	4	3	0	2	0	—		31	4
Bristol City	2023–24	Championship	0	0	0	0	0	0	—		0	0
Bristol City	2024–25	Championship	0	0	0	0	0	0	0	0	0	0
Bristol City	2025–26	Championship	25	3	1	1	0	0	—		26	4
Bristol City	Total		85	9	5	1	2	0	—		92	10
Portsmouth (loan)	2024–25	Championship	14	2	1	0	—		—		15	2
Career total			207	15	14	1	3	0	11	1	235	17

== Honours ==
Individual

- PFA Team of the Year: 2020–21 League One
- EFL League One Team of the Season: 2020–21
