= Malachi Napa =

English footballer (born 1999)

Personal information
- Full name: Malachi Tyrese Mthokozisi Napa
- Date of birth: 26 May 1999 (age 27)
- Height: 5 ft 6 in (1.68 m)
- Position: Midfielder

Team information
- Current team: Aveley

Youth career
- Reading
- 2015–2017: Oxford United

Senior career*
Years	Team	Apps	(Gls)
2017–2021	Oxford United	14	(0)
2017	→ North Leigh (loan)	9	(0)
2017	→ Hampton & Richmond Borough (loan)	13	(2)
2018–2019	→ Macclesfield Town (loan)	15	(0)
2020	→ Woking (loan)	4	(1)
2021	→ Woking (loan)	10	(0)
2021	Woking	5	(0)
2021–2022	Maldon & Tiptree	23	(6)
2022–2023	Wealdstone	9	(0)
2022–2023	→ Dartford (loan)	20	(3)
2023	Billericay Town	7	(0)
2024–2026	Redbridge	61	(32)
2026	Ramsgate	5	(0)
2026–	Maldon & Tiptree	2	(1)
- * Club domestic league appearances and goals as of 14:37, 22 March 2026 (UTC)

Malachi Tyrese Mthokozisi Napa (born 26 May 1999) is an English professional footballer who plays as a midfielder for Isthmian League Premier Division club Maldon & Tiptree.

== Club career ==
Napa was born in London and grew up in North Woolwich. He played youth football with Reading and Oxford United's Academy before signing his first professional contract with Oxford United in May 2017. After a loan period with Hampton & Richmond Borough, he made his senior Oxford debut as a 65th-minute substitute in an EFL Trophy win over Gillingham in December 2017, providing the assist for Alex Mowatt to score the injury-time winner. His league debut was also as a substitute, in a home victory over Milton Keynes Dons on 1 January 2018. His first start was in Karl Robinson's first match in charge, a televised 3–0 league defeat at Portsmouth on 25 March 2018.

In August 2018 he signed a new three-year contract with Oxford, and joined Macclesfield Town on loan until January 2019. After playing 22 games (in all competitions) at the start of the season, his appearances became less frequent under new manager Sol Campbell, and he returned to his parent club in early 2019 to recover from a virus.

On his return to the Oxford first team in an EFL Cup first-round match against Peterborough United on 13 August 2019, Napa suffered a broken leg.

On 2 October 2020 he went on a short-term loan to National League side Woking.

On 22 January 2021, Napa returned to Woking on a one-month loan, following a prolonged injury lay-off. On 25 March 2021, the loan was made permanent, with Napa signing a deal until the end of the 2020–21 campaign.

On 13 August 2021, following his release from Woking, Napa opted to join Isthmian League North Division side Maldon & Tiptree and went onto score on his debut during a 7–0 victory over Romford, a day later.

On 15 July 2022, Napa agreed to return to the National League to join Wealdstone following a successful trial period.

On 9 December 2022, Napa joined Dartford on an initial one-month loan.

At the end of the 2022–23 season Napa was released by Wealdstone. Following his release, he joined Billericay Town.

In March 2026, following a short spell with Ramsgate, Napa returned to Isthmian League North Division side Maldon & Tiptree.

== Personal life ==
Napa is of Zimbabwean Shona and South African descent.

== Career statistics ==
As of match played 7 March 2026

Appearances and goals by club, season and competition
Club	Season	League			FA Cup		League Cup		Other		Total	
Club	Season	Division	Apps	Goals	Apps	Goals	Apps	Goals	Apps	Goals	Apps	Goals
Oxford United	2016–17	League One	0	0	0	0	0	0	0	0	0	0
Oxford United	2017–18	League One	14	0	—		0	0	3 (Note: Appearances in the EFL Trophy)	0	17	0
Oxford United	2018–19	League One	0	0	—		0	0	0	0	0	0
Oxford United	2019–20	League One	0	0	0	0	1	0	0	0	1	0
Oxford United	2020–21	League One	0	0	0	0	0	0	1	0	1	0
Oxford United	Oxford United total		14	0	0	0	1	0	4	0	19	0
North Leigh (loan)	2016–17	Southern League Division One South & West	9	0	—		—		—		9	0
Hampton & Richmond Borough (loan)	2017–18	National League South	13	2	4	1	—		0	0	17	3
Macclesfield Town (loan)	2018–19	League Two	15	0	1	0	3	0	3	0	22	0
Woking (loan)	2020–21	National League	14	1	1	0	—		2 (Note: Appearances in the FA Trophy)	1	17	2
Woking	2020–21	National League	5	0	—		—		1	0	6	0
Maldon & Tiptree	2021–22	Isthmian League North Division	23	6	1	0	—		3 (Note: One appearance in the FA Trophy, two appearances and one goal in the Alan Turvey Trophy)	1	27	7
Wealdstone	2022–23	National League	9	0	0	0	—		0	0	9	0
Dartford (loan)	2022–23	National League South	20	3	—		—		2 (Note: One appearance in the Kent Senior Cup) (Note: One appearance in the London Senior Cup)	0	22	3
Billericay Town	2023–24	Isthmian League Premier Division	7	0	2	0	—		0	0	9	0
Redbridge	2024–25	Isthmian League North Division	32	11	0	0	—		0	0	32	11
Redbridge	2025–26	Isthmian League North Division	29	21	3	0	—		5 (Note: One appearance in FA Trophy, three appearances and four goals in Alan Turvey Trophy, one appearance and one goal in London Senior Cup)	5	37	26
Total		61	176	44	12	1	3	0	5	69	37	52
Ramsgate	2025–26	Isthmian League Premier Division	5	0	—		—		0	0	5	0
Career total			195	44	12	1	4	0	20	7	231	52
