= Charlie Pattison =

English footballer

Personal information
- Full name: Charlie George Pattison
- Date of birth: 28 December 2000 (age 25)
- Place of birth: Bedford, England
- Position: Midfielder

Youth career
- –2019: Milton Keynes Dons

Senior career*
Years	Team	Apps	(Gls)
2019–2020	Milton Keynes Dons	0	(0)
2019	→ Welwyn Garden City (loan)	15	(1)
2019	→ Kings Langley (loan)	5	(1)
2019–2020	→ Biggleswade Town (loan)	6	(0)
- * Club domestic league appearances and goals as of 12:25, 6 July 2020 (UTC)

Charlie George Pattison (born 28 December 2000) is an English former professional footballer who played as a midfielder.

== Career ==
=== Milton Keynes Dons ===
Pattison joined Milton Keynes Dons' academy at under-9 level, progressing through various age groups and into the club's development squad eventually going on to captain the club's U18 team. On 4 September 2018, whilst still an academy player, Pattison featured for the first team as an 81st-minute substitute against Peterborough United in an EFL Trophy group stage fixture.

Following a spell on loan with non-league Welwyn Garden City, Pattison signed professional terms with Milton Keynes Dons in June 2019. During the 2019–20 season, Pattison enjoyed short spells on loan with non-league sides Kings Langley and Biggleswade Town. However, at the conclusion of the campaign, Pattison was one of nine players released from the club following limited opportunities.

After being released by MK Dons, Pattison had a spell with Banbury United FC and then one with AFC Dunstable. On 13 January 2023, his signing by AFC Rushden & Diamonds was announced.

== Career statistics ==
As of 10 June 2020.

Appearances and goals by club, season and competition
Club	Season	League			FA Cup		League Cup		Other		Total	
Club	Season	Division	Apps	Goals	Apps	Goals	Apps	Goals	Apps	Goals	Apps	Goals
Milton Keynes Dons	2018–19	League Two	0	0	0	0	0	0	1 (Note: Appearance(s) in EFL Trophy.)	0	1	0
Milton Keynes Dons	2019–20	League One	0	0	—		0	0	0	0	0	0
Milton Keynes Dons	Total		0	0	0	0	0	0	1	0	1	0
Welwyn Garden City (loan)	2018–19	Southern Division 1C	15	1	—		—		—		15	1
Kings Langley (loan)	2019–20	Southern Premier Central	5	1	4	0	—		2 (Note: One appearance each in FA Trophy and Southern League Cup.)	0	11	1
Biggleswade Town (loan)	2019–20	Southern Premier Central	6	0	—		—		0	0	6	0
Career total			26	2	4	0	0	0	3	0	33	2

== Honours ==
- Welwyn Garden City Young Player of the Year: 2018–19
- Milton Keynes Dons Academy Player of the Year: 2018–19
