= 2019–20 Milton Keynes Dons F.C. season =

Milton Keynes Dons
2019–20 season
- Chairman: Pete Winkelman
- Manager: Paul Tisdale (until 2 November); Russell Martin (from 3 November)
- Stadium: Stadium MK
- League One: 19th
- FA Cup: First round
- EFL Cup: Third round
- EFL Trophy: Third round
- Top goalscorer: League: Rhys Healey (11); All: Rhys Healey (12)
- Highest home attendance: 28,521 (vs Liverpool); 25 September 2019, EFL Cup R3
- Lowest home attendance: 1,101 (vs Wycombe Wanderers); 12 November 2019, EFL Trophy Group G
- Average home league attendance: 9,246
- Biggest win: 4–1 (vs Southend United); 27 August 2019, EFL Cup R2
- Biggest defeat: 0–4 (vs Peterborough United); 24 August 2019, League One
Home colours	Away colours	Third colours

Milton Keynes Dons played their 16th season in 2019–20, which was the club's first season back in League One following promotion from League Two at the end of the 2018–19 season. Along with competing in League One, the club also competed in the FA Cup, EFL Cup and EFL Trophy.

Fixtures were suspended on 13 March 2020 due to the COVID-19 pandemic. Clubs later voted to end the season prematurely with immediate effect on 9 June 2020, with the final table decided upon by an unweighted points-per-game system resulting in the club finishing the season in 19th place.

The season covered the period from 1 July 2019 to 30 June 2020.

== Competitions ==
=== League One ===
Final table

Pos	Team	Pld	W	D	L	GF	GA	GD	Pts	PPG
19	Milton Keynes Dons	35	10	7	18	36	47	−11	37	1.06
20	AFC Wimbledon	35	8	11	16	39	52	−13	35	1.00
21	Tranmere Rovers (R)	34	8	8	18	36	60	−24	32	0.94
22	Southend United (R)	35	4	7	24	39	85	−46	19	0.54
23	Bolton Wanderers (R)	34	5	11	18	27	66	−39	14 (Note: Bolton Wanderers deducted 12 points under EFL Regulations (12pts).)	0.41

Source: Sky Sports

Matches

Win	Draw	Loss

Date	Opponent	Venue	Result	Scorers	Attendance	Ref
10 August 2019 – 15:00	Shrewsbury Town	Home	1–0	Healey	7,967	
17 August 2019 – 15:00	Wycombe Wanderers	Away	2–3	Bowery, Houghton	5,243	
20 August 2019 – 19:45	Lincoln City	Home	2–1	Brittain, Williams	8,166	
24 August 2019 – 15:00	Peterborough United	Home	0–4		9,402	
31 August 2019 – 15:00	Accrington Stanley	Away	1–2	Agard	2,218	
6 September 2019 – 12:00	AFC Wimbledon	Home	2–1	Nombe, Healey	8,627	
14 September 2019 – 15:00	Blackpool	Away	3–0	Martin, Houghton, Kasumu	8,283	
17 September 2019 – 19:45	Ipswich Town	Home	0–1		10,167	
21 September 2019 – 15:00	Southend United	Home	0–1		7,493	
28 September 2019 – 15:00	Sunderland	Away	1–2	Bowery	29,954	
5 October 2019 – 15:00	Burton Albion	Home	0–3		9,111	
12 October 2019 – 15:00	Bristol Rovers	Away	0–1		7,864	
19 October 2019 – 15:00	Coventry City	Home	0–0		13,621	
22 October 2019 – 19:45	Rochdale	Away	0–2		2,286	
26 October 2019 – 15:00	Fleetwood Town	Away	0–1		2,722	
2 November 2019 – 15:00	Tranmere Rovers	Home	1–3	Reeves	7,171	
16 November 2019 – 15:00	Bolton Wanderers	Away	0–1		11,819	
23 November 2019 – 15:00	Rotherham United	Home	2–3	Gilbey, Mason	7,811	
7 December 2019 – 15:00	Doncaster Rovers	Away	1–1	Gilbey	7,193	
14 December 2019 – 15:00	Oxford United	Home	1–0	Mason	10,031	
21 December 2019 – 15:00	Gillingham	Away	1–3	Gilbey	4,739	
26 December 2019 – 15:00	Southend United	Away	2–2	Mason, Healey	6,189	
29 December 2019 – 15:00	Portsmouth	Home	3–1	Healey, McGrandles, Gilbey	12,788	
1 January 2020 – 15:00	Bristol Rovers	Home	3–0	Healey, Nombe, Agard	8,236	
11 January 2020 – 15:00	Coventry City	Away	1–1	Morris	6,666	
14 January 2020 – 19:45	Burton Albion	Away	0–1		2,005	
18 January 2020 – 15:00	Sunderland	Home	0–1		13,327	
28 January 2020 – 19:45	Rochdale	Home	2–1	Morris, Healey	6,393	
1 February 2020 – 15:00	Wycombe Wanderers	Home	2–0	Healey, Gladwin	9,699	
8 February 2020 – 15:00	Shrewsbury Town	Away	1–1	Healey	5,791	
11 February 2020 – 19:45	Lincoln City	Away	1–1	Healey	7.783	
22 February 2020 – 15:00	Bolton Wanderers	Home	1–0	Healey	8,539	
25 February 2020 – 19:45	Portsmouth	Away	1–3	Gilbey	16,577	
29 February 2020 – 15:00	Rotherham United	Away	1–1	Healey	8,883	
7 March 2020 – 15:00	Doncaster Rovers	Home	0–1		7,880	

=== FA Cup ===
Matches

Win	Draw	Loss

Date	Round	Opponent	Venue	Result	Scorers	Attendance	Ref
9 November 2019 – 15:00	First round	Port Vale	Home	0–1		3,598	

=== EFL Cup ===
Matches

Win	Draw	Loss

Date	Round	Opponent	Venue	Result	Scorers	Attendance	Ref
13 August 2019 – 19:45	First round	AFC Wimbledon	Away	2–2 (Note: After 90 minutes. MK Dons won 4–2 on penalties.)	McGrandles, Kasumu	2,191	
27 August 2019 – 19:45	Second round	Southend United	Away	4–1	Healey, Brittain, Boateng, Nombe	2,433	
25 September 2019 – 19:45	Third round	Liverpool	Home	0–2		28,521	

=== EFL Trophy ===
Southern Group G Table

Pos	Div	Team	Pld	W	PW	PL	L	GF	GA	GD	Pts	Qualification
1	L1	Milton Keynes Dons	3	2	0	0	1	5	2	+3	6	Advance to Round 2
2	L2	Stevenage	3	1	1	0	1	2	4	−2	5	Advance to Round 2
3	ACA	Fulham U21	3	1	0	1	1	3	3	0	4	
4	L1	Wycombe Wanderers	3	1	0	0	2	3	4	−1	3	

Source: EFL.com

Matches

Win	Draw	Loss

Date	Round	Opponent	Venue	Result	Scorers	Attendance	Ref
3 September 2019 – 19:45	Group stage	Stevenage	Away	3–0	McGrandles, Nombe (2)		
1 October 2019 – 19:45	Group stage	Fulham U21	Home	1–0	Agard		
12 November 2019 – 19:45	Group stage	Wycombe Wanderers	Home	1–2	Dickenson	1,101	
3 December 2019 – 19:45	Second round	Coventry City	Home	2–0	Agard, Mason	1,686	
7 January 2020 – 19:30	Third round	Newport County	Away	0–3		767	

== Player details ==
Note: Players' ages as of the club's opening fixture of the 2019–20 season.

#	Name	Nationality	Position	Date of birth (age)	Signed from	Signed in	Transfer fee
Goalkeepers
1	Lee Nicholls	(England)	GK	5 October 1992 (aged 26)	Free agent	2016	Free
13	Andy Fisher	(England)	GK	12 February 1998 (aged 21)	(England) Blackburn Rovers	2020	Loan
Defenders
2	George Williams	(England)	RB	14 April 1993 (aged 26)	(England) Barnsley	2016	Free
3	Dean Lewington	(England)	LB	18 May 1984 (aged 35)	(England) Wimbledon	2004	Free
4	Joe Walsh	(Wales)	CB	13 May 1992 (aged 27)	(England) Crawley Town	2015	Undisclosed
5	Regan Poole	(Wales)	CB	18 June 1998 (aged 21)	(England) Manchester United	2019	Free
6	Baily Cargill	(England)	CB	5 July 1995 (aged 24)	Free agent	2018	Free
15	Jordan Moore-Taylor	(England)	CB	24 January 1994 (aged 25)	(England) Exeter City	2018	Free
16	Russell Martin	(Scotland)	CB	4 January 1986 (aged 33)	Free agent	2019	Free
25	Callum Brittain	(England)	RB	12 March 1998 (aged 21)	Academy	2016	Trainee
Midfielders
7	Ben Reeves	(Northern Ireland)	AM	19 November 1991 (aged 27)	Free agent	2019	Free
8	Alex Gilbey	(England)	AM	9 December 1994 (aged 24)	(England) Wigan Athletic	2017	Undisclosed
17	Ben Gladwin	(England)	CM	8 June 1992 (aged 27)	Free agent	2020	Free
18	Conor McGrandles	(Scotland)	CM	21 October 1999 (aged 19)	(England) Norwich City	2017	Free
19	Louis Thompson	(Wales)	DM	19 December 1994 (aged 24)	(England) Norwich City	2020	Loan
24	Jordan Houghton	(England)	DM	5 November 1995 (aged 23)	Free agent	2018	Free
26	Hiram Boateng	(England)	AM	8 January 1996 (aged 23)	(England) Exeter City	2019	Compensation
29	David Kasumu	(Nigeria)	CM	5 October 1999 (aged 19)	Academy	2017	Trainee
33	Ryan Harley	(England)	AM	22 January 1985 (aged 34)	(England) Exeter City	2018	Free
38	Charlie Pattison	(England)	AM	28 December 2000 (aged 18)	Academy	2019	Trainee
Forwards
9	Jordan Bowery	(England)	CF	2 July 1991 (aged 28)	(England) Crewe Alexandra	2019	Free
10	Rhys Healey	(England)	CF	6 December 1994 (aged 24)	(Wales) Cardiff City	2019	Undisclosed
14	Kieran Agard	(England)	CF	10 October 1989 (aged 29)	(England) Bristol City	2016	Undisclosed
20	Joe Mason	(Republic of Ireland)	CF	13 May 1991 (aged 28)	Free agent	2019	Free
23	Carlton Morris	(England)	CF	16 December 1995 (aged 23)	(England) Norwich City	2020	Loan
27	Sam Nombe	(England)	CF	22 October 1998 (aged 20)	Academy	2017	Trainee
Out on loan
12	Laurie Walker	(England)	GK	14 October 1989 (aged 29)	Free agent	2019	Free
37	Dylan Asonganyi	(England)	CF	10 December 2000 (aged 18)	Academy	2017	Trainee
39	Jay Bird	(England)	CF	6 May 2001 (aged 18)	Academy	2019	Trainee
40	Matthew Sorinola	(England)	LWB	19 February 2001 (aged 18)	Academy	2019	Trainee
Left club during season
11	Brennan Dickenson	(England)	LW	26 February 1993 (aged 26)	(England) Colchester United	2019	Free

== Transfers ==
=== Transfers in ===
Date from	Position	Name	From	Fee	Ref.
1 July 2019	DM	(England) Hiram Boateng	Exeter City	Compensation	
1 July 2019	CF	(England) Jordan Bowery	Crewe Alexandra	Free transfer	
1 July 2019	LM	(England) Brennan Dickenson	Colchester United	Free transfer	
1 July 2019	CF	(Republic of Ireland) Joe Mason	Free agent (Note: Previous club: Wolverhampton Wanderers.)	Free transfer	
1 July 2019	CB	(Wales) Regan Poole	Manchester United	Free transfer	
1 July 2019	GK	(England) Laurie Walker	Free agent (Note: Previous club: Hemel Hempstead Town.)	Free transfer	
16 July 2019	CF	(England) Rhys Healey	Cardiff City	Undisclosed	
1 August 2019	AM	(Northern Ireland) Ben Reeves	Free agent	Free transfer	
10 January 2020	CM	(England) Ben Gladwin	Free agent	Free transfer	

=== Transfers out ===
Date from	Position	Name	To	Fee	Ref.
1 July 2019	CF	(England) Chuks Aneke	Charlton Athletic	Free transfer	
1 July 2019	CB	(France) Mathieu Baudry	Swindon Town	Free transfer	
1 July 2019	DM	(Mali) Ousseynou Cissé	Gillingham	Free transfer	
1 July 2019	CM	(England) Lawson D'Ath	Released (Note: Joined Yeovil Town on 3 August 2019.)		
1 July 2019	LB	(England) Mitch Hancox	Solihull Moors	Free transfer	
1 July 2019	CB	(England) Oran Jackson	Released (Note: Joined ÍBV on 18 July 2019.)		
1 July 2019	CF	(England) Robbie Simpson	Released (Note: Joined Chelmsford City on 15 August 2019.)		
1 July 2019	CM	(England) Liam Sole	Released (Note: Joined Nottingham Forest on 28 October 2019.)		
1 July 2019	CB	(England) Finn Tapp	Released (Note: Joined Oxford City on 19 July 2019.)		
1 July 2019	LW	(Ghana) Brandon Thomas-Asante	Released (Note: Joined Ebbsfleet United on 9 August 2019.)		
1 July 2019	DM	(England) Ryan Watson	Northampton Town	Free transfer	
17 January 2020	LM	(England) Brennan Dickenson	Exeter City	Free transfer	

=== Loans in ===
Start date	Position	Name	From	End date	Ref.
8 January 2020	CF	(England) Carlton Morris	Norwich City	End of season	
16 January 2020	DM	(Wales) Louis Thompson	Norwich City	End of season	
31 January 2020	GK	(England) Andrew Fisher	Blackburn Rovers	End of season	

=== Loans out ===
Start date	Position	Name	To	End date	Ref.
5 July 2019	GK	(England) Laurie Walker	Hampton & Richmond Borough	End of season	
9 August 2019	CF	(England) Jay Bird	Hitchin Town	End of season	
5 September 2019	CM	(England) Charlie Pattison	Kings Langley	2 November 2019	
30 November 2019	CM	(England) Charlie Pattison	Biggleswade Town	3 January 2020	
3 January 2020	CM	(England) Charlie Pattison	Biggleswade Town	1 February 2020	
14 February 2020	LB	(England) Matthew Sorinola	Beaconsfield Town	End of season	
13 March 2020	CF	(England) Dylan Asonganyi	Maidenhead United	End of season	

== Awards ==
- EFL League One Player of the Month (December 2019): Alex Gilbey
