= Olamide Shodipo =

Irish footballer (born 1997)

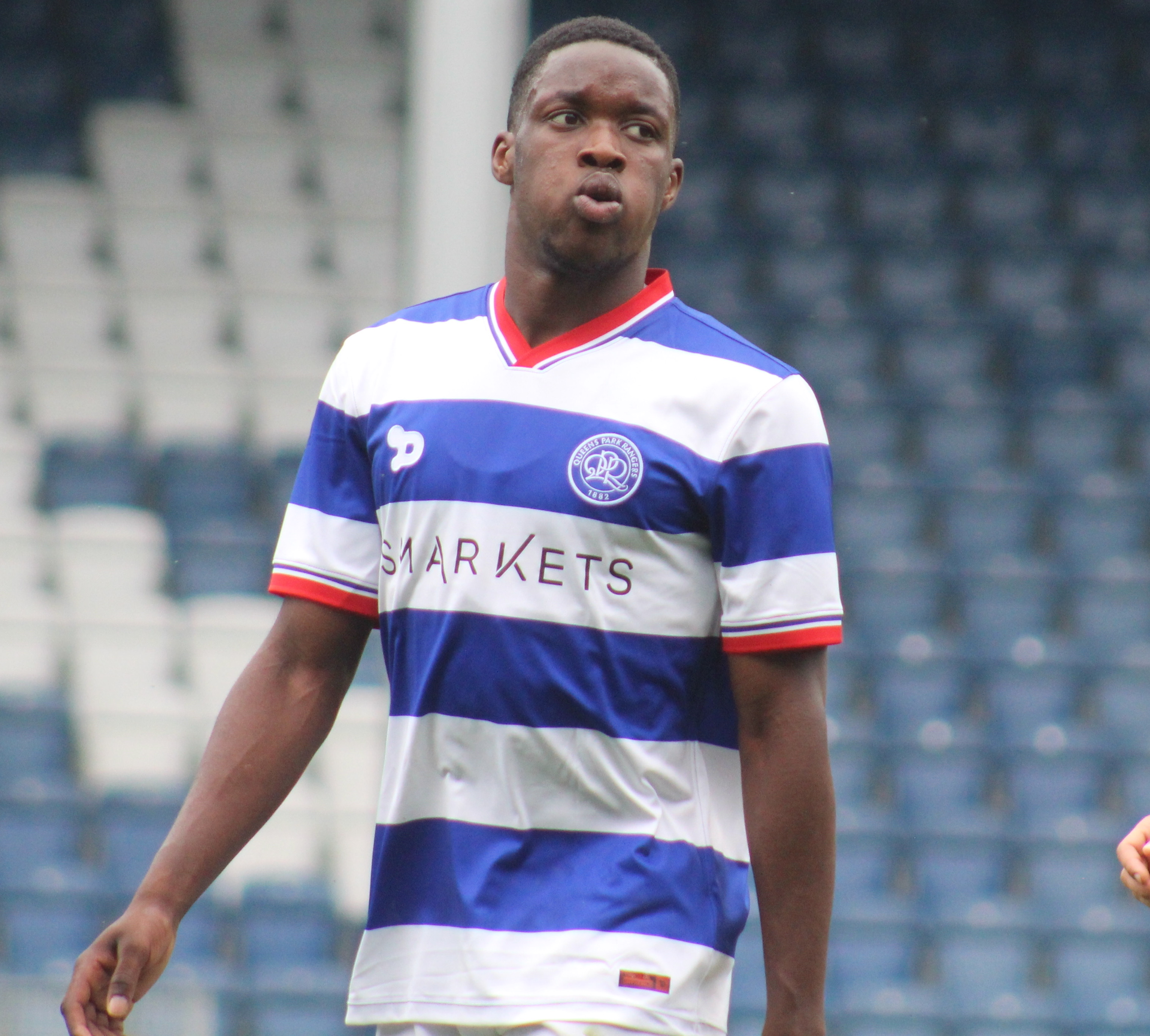
- Shodipo pictured in July 2016.

Personal information
- Full name: Olamide Oluwatimilehin Babatunde Oluwaka Shodipo
- Date of birth: 5 July 1997 (age 29)
- Place of birth: Leixlip, Ireland
- Height: 1.76 m (5 ft 9 in)
- Position: Winger

Youth career
- 2012–2015: Queens Park Rangers

Senior career*
Years	Team	Apps	(Gls)
2015–2023	Queens Park Rangers	38	(0)
2017	→ Port Vale (loan)	6	(0)
2018	→ Colchester United (loan)	6	(0)
2020–2021	→ Oxford United (loan)	39	(10)
2021–2022	→ Sheffield Wednesday (loan)	15	(1)
2023	→ Lincoln City (loan)	20	(2)
2023–2024	Lincoln City	6	(1)
2024–2025	Feirense	28	(3)
2026	Sanjoanense	3	(0)

International career
2015	Republic of Ireland U19	4	(0)
2016–2018	Republic of Ireland U21	6	(1)
- * Club domestic league appearances and goals as of 7 May 2026

Olamide Oluwatimilehin Babatunde Oluwaka Shodipo (born 5 July 1997) is an Irish professional footballer who plays as a winger.

Shodipo made his first-team debut for Queens Park Rangers in August 2016 and has been capped by the Republic of Ireland at under-19 and under-21 levels. He joined Port Vale on loan in January 2017 and joined Colchester United on loan in January 2018. He made 13 appearances for QPR during the 2019–20 season, though he spent the following season on loan at Oxford United and was loaned out to Sheffield Wednesday for the 2021–22 campaign. He joined Lincoln City on loan for the second half of the 2022–23 season and then signed for the club on a short-term deal in October 2023. He joined Portuguese club Feirense in January 2024. He joined Sanjoanense in 2026.

== Club career ==
=== Queens Park Rangers ===
Shodipo was born in Leixlip, on the outskirts of Dublin, Ireland, before moving to London at the age of two. He signed a two-year contract extension with Queens Park Rangers in April 2016. He made his senior debut in the opening game of the 2016–17 EFL Championship season on 7 August 2016, in a 3–0 win over Leeds United at Loftus Road; he was named in the starting lineup, and was later substituted in the 68th minute for Abdenasser El Khayati. Manager Jimmy Floyd Hasselbaink later said that Shodipo had "that rawness... that streetness and that fight" and said "we will definitely be putting him in and around the team regularly". On 30 November, Shodipo signed a new two-and-a-half-year contract with QPR, tying him to the club until 2019. However, new manager Ian Holloway left him out of the team in favour of new signing Kazenga LuaLua, explaining his decision by saying "every time I've put him on, unfortunately the team has let a goal in"; Holloway said "he would benefit massively from a loan spell", which he hoped would improve the defensive and tactical side of his game.

On 30 January 2017, Shodipo signed with EFL League One side Port Vale on loan until the end of the 2016–17 season. He made six appearances for the "Valiants" before being ruled out for the rest of the season after picking up a tendinitis injury on international duty in March 2017.

On 31 January 2018, he joined EFL League Two side Colchester United on loan until the end of the 2017–18 season. He came off the bench to make his debut on 10 March in the "U's" 1–1 draw at Mansfield Town. However, he was limited to just two starts and four substitute appearances by manager John McGreal during his time at the Colchester Community Stadium.

He suffered a significant tear to his thigh muscle in September 2018 and was ruled out of action for four months. He was praised by manager Steve McClaren upon his return to playing and featured four times for QPR during the 2018–19 season, before having his contract extended by a further 12 months in May 2019. Director of football Les Ferdinand said that "He's had a tough time with injuries in the last couple of years but hopefully that is behind him now and we are looking forward to seeing him out on the pitch next season." He was handed a new contract by new manager Mark Warburton in September 2019, keeping him at the club until summer 2022.

On 16 October 2020, he joined League One side Oxford United on loan for the 2020–21 season; manager Karl Robinson said that "he is an exciting player to watch, very unpredictable but always a threat because he has so much pace and a willingness to take people on". He came off the bench to score the winning goal on his debut for the "U's" three days later, in a 3–2 win over Milton Keynes Dons at the Kassam Stadium. He was nominated for January's PFA January Player of the Month award. He scored ten goals from 39 League One games, including one goal that helped to secure a play-off place on the final day of the campaign. He also scored against Blackpool in the play-off semi-finals, though Oxford lost 6–3 on aggregate.

On 11 July 2021, he signed for League One club Sheffield Wednesday on a season-long loan deal. On arriving at the club, Shodipo said that "the fans are immense and I'm looking forward to working with Darren Moore. I want to come and help the team as much as possible and aim for promotion". He would make his competitive debut for the "Owls" on 1 August, in an EFL Cup tie with Huddersfield Town at Hillsborough, however, an injury would see him replaced in the first half. He would make his return from his injury against Huddersfield Town, coming off the bench on 11 September 2021, against Plymouth Argyle. He would score his first goal for the "Owls" in a 2–2 home draw with Wycombe Wanderers on 27 November. However, he picked up a long-term injury, reported to be hamstring related, the following month. Moore did not include Shodipo in the EFL squad list in January, though said that he could be re-added before the 24 March deadline. Shodipo did make two final substitute appearances in April to take his final total at Sheffield Wednesday to 21 appearances, including only seven league starts. With his contract at QPR expiring in summer 2022, he was reportedly in contract negotiations at Loftus Road.

He had made eleven Championship appearances for QPR in the first half of the 2022–23 campaign before new manager Neil Critchley decided he was not in his first-team plans. Shodipo was released by Queens Park Rangers at the end of the season. He went on trial at Reading in July 2023.

=== Lincoln City ===
On 14 January 2023, Shodipo joined League One side Lincoln City on loan for the remainder of the 2022–23 season, making his debut the same day against Milton Keynes Dons. He scored two goals in twenty games for Lincoln.

On 6 October 2023, Shodipo signed a short-term contract with Lincoln to run until early January, with director of football Jez George citing "significant injuries to Ben House and Tyler Walker". He made his permanent debut coming off the bench against Peterborough United the next day. On 5 January 2024, it was confirmed his short-term deal had come to an end.

=== Feirense ===
On 30 January 2024, Shodipo joined Liga Portugal 2 club Feirense. He scored two goals in 13 games in the second half of the 2023–24 season. He played 16 times in the 2024–25 campaign before being released.

Shodipo returned to England and was part of the 40-man Professional Footballers' Association (PFA) free agent squad that played friendly matches in July 2025. He played two games for Liga 3 side Sanjoanense in February 2026. He was again in the PFA squad in June 2026.

== International career ==
Also eligible to play for Nigeria, Shodipo made his debut for the Republic of Ireland under-19 team in October 2015 and made his debut for the under-21 team in September 2016.

== Style of play ==
Speaking in January 2017, Ian Holloway praised Shodipo's dribbling and crossing skills, though he said he had work to do to improve his defensive game.

== Career statistics ==
As of match played 26 April 2026

Appearances and goals by club, season and competition
Club	Season	League			National cup (Note: Includes FA Cup, Taça de Portugal)		League cup (Note: Includes EFL Cup, Taça da Liga)		Other		Total	
Club	Season	Division	Apps	Goals	Apps	Goals	Apps	Goals	Apps	Goals	Apps	Goals
Queens Park Rangers	2015–16	Championship	0	0	0	0	0	0	—		0	0
Queens Park Rangers	2016–17	Championship	11	0	1	0	2	0	—		14	0
Queens Park Rangers	2017–18	Championship	0	0	0	0	0	0	—		0	0
Queens Park Rangers	2018–19	Championship	4	0	0	0	0	0	—		4	0
Queens Park Rangers	2019–20	Championship	12	0	1	0	0	0	—		13	0
Queens Park Rangers	2020–21	Championship	0	0	0	0	1	0	—		1	0
Queens Park Rangers	2021–22	Championship	0	0	0	0	0	0	—		0	0
Queens Park Rangers	2022–23	Championship	11	0	0	0	1	0	—		12	0
Queens Park Rangers	Total		38	0	2	0	4	0	—		44	0
Port Vale (loan)	2016–17	League One	6	0	—		—		—		6	0
Colchester United (loan)	2017–18	League Two	6	0	—		—		—		6	0
Oxford United (loan)	2020–21	League One	39	10	1	0	—		6 (Note: 4 appearances and two goals in the EFL Trophy and 2 appearances and 1 goal in the play-offs.)	3	46	13
Sheffield Wednesday (loan)	2021–22	League One	15	1	2	0	1	0	3 (Note: Appearances in the EFL Trophy)	0	21	1
Lincoln City (loan)	2022–23	League One	20	2	—		—		—		20	2
Lincoln City	2023–24	League One	6	1	0	0	0	0	3	0	9	1
Lincoln City	Total		26	3	0	0	0	0	3	0	29	3
Feirense	2023–24	Liga Portugal 2	12	2	0	0	0	0	1 (Note: Appearances in the play-offs)	0	13	2
Feirense	2024–25	Liga Portugal 2	16	1	0	0	0	0	0	0	16	1
Feirense	Total		28	3	0	0	0	0	1	0	29	3
Sanjoanense	2025–26	Liga 3	3	0	0	0	0	0	0	0	3	0
Career total			161	17	5	0	5	0	13	3	184	20
