= Matty Taylor (footballer, born 1990) =

English footballer

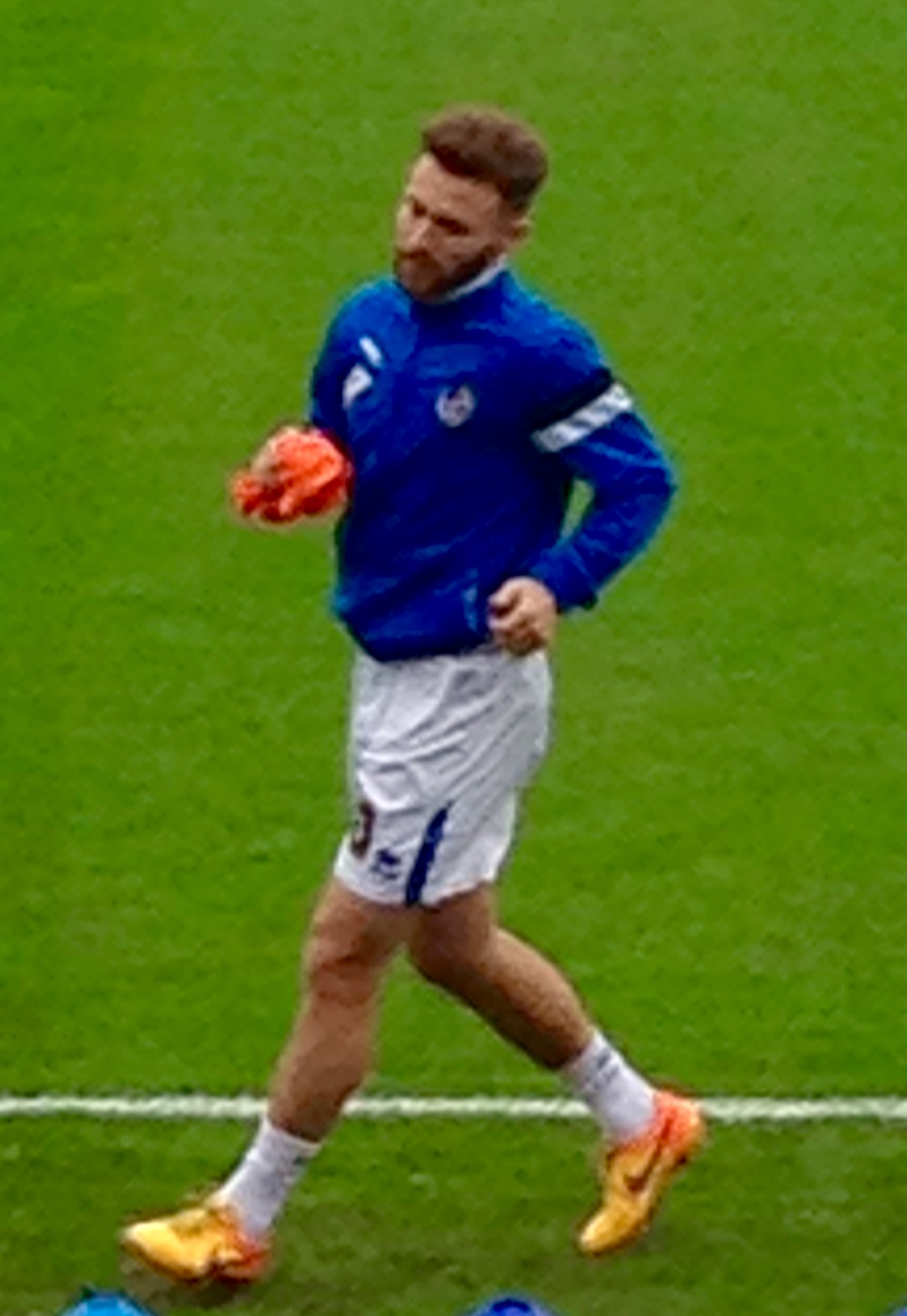
- Taylor warming up for Bristol Rovers in 2015

Personal information
- Full name: Matthew James Taylor
- Date of birth: 30 March 1990 (age 36)
- Place of birth: Kidlington, England
- Height: 5 ft 9 in (1.76 m)
- Position: Striker

Team information
- Current team: Oxford City

Youth career
- 1998–2007: Oxford United

Senior career*
| Years | Team | Apps | (Gls) |
| 2007–2009 | Oxford United | 7 | (0) |
| 2008 | → Abingdon United (loan) | | |
| 2009 | Didcot Town | | |
| 2009–2011 | North Leigh | | |
| 2011–2014 | Forest Green Rovers | 96 | (22) |
| 2014 | → Chester (loan) | 7 | (6) |
| 2014–2017 | Bristol Rovers | 118 | (61) |
| 2017–2020 | Bristol City | 67 | (7) |
| 2019–2020 | → Oxford United (loan) | 26 | (13) |
| 2020–2023 | Oxford United | 112 | (41) |
| 2023 | → Port Vale (loan) | 14 | (4) |
| 2023–2024 | Forest Green Rovers | 17 | (2) |
| 2024–2025 | Cheltenham Town | 50 | (12) |
| 2025–2026 | Salisbury | 20 | (2) |
| 2026– | Oxford City | 12 | (5) |

International career
| 2014 | England C | 2 | (3) |
- * Club domestic league appearances and goals as of 19:02, 1 May 2026 (UTC)

Matthew James Taylor (born 30 March 1990) is an English footballer who plays as a striker for National League North club Oxford City, whilst coaching in the academy at EFL League One club Oxford United.

Taylor made his debut in the Conference Premier at Oxford United during the 2007–08 season and went on to spend time on loan at Abingdon United, before joining Didcot Town on a free transfer in June 2009. He moved on to North Leigh later in the year, where his scoring record in the Southern League earned him a return to the Conference Premier with Forest Green Rovers in September 2011. He played over 100 games for the club and also scored six goals in seven games on loan at Chester and won a cap for the England C team, before signing with Bristol Rovers in June 2014. He helped Rovers to win promotion into the Football League via the play-offs in 2015. A second successive promotion was secured in the 2015–16 campaign, and he was named on the PFA Team of the Year after finishing as League Two's top scorer with 27 goals.

After scoring 19 goals for Bristol Rovers in the first half of the 2016–17 season, he transferred to local derby rivals Bristol City for a fee of around £300,000 in January 2017. He was limited to nine Championship goals in a three-year stay, though he did feature in the club's run to the semi-finals of the EFL Cup in the 2017–18 campaign. He rejoined Oxford United on loan in August 2019 and signed a permanent deal with the club in July 2020. He finished as Oxford's top scorer for three successive League One campaigns between 2019–20 and 2021–22, scoring 64 goals in 164 league and cup appearances. He joined Port Vale on loan for the second half of the 2022–23 season and rejoined Forest Green Rovers in July 2023. He signed with Cheltenham Town in February 2024, before he returned to non-League football with Salisbury in July 2025.

== Club career ==
=== Early career ===
Taylor was born in Kidlington, Oxfordshire, and attended Gosford Hill School and Oxford & Cherwell Valley College. His football career started at Conference Premier club Oxford United, having been in the academy since the age of eight. He played four games in the 2007–08 season and seven in the 2008–09 campaign. In 2008, he had a loan spell at Southern League Division One South & West club Abingdon United. In June 2009, he signed for newly promoted Southern League Premier Division club Didcot Town on a free transfer, following his release from Oxford days after helping the team lift the Oxfordshire Senior Cup. In 2009, he moved on to Southern League South & West Division club North Leigh. He was one of the Southern League's top scorers during the 2010–11 season, with a hat-trick against Bridgwater Town taking him to 22 league goals by March. He went on to score 40 goals in all competitions that season, leaving him with a final total of 80 goals in 92 games for the club, and turned down the offer of a full-time contract from Newport County to sign a new part-time contract with North Leigh in July 2011. He missed the start of the new season with a minor knee injury.

=== Forest Green Rovers ===
In September 2011, Taylor had a trial with Cheltenham Town but went on to sign for Forest Green Rovers. Taylor was scouted by the club's academy boss Scott Bartlett, and manager Dave Hockaday said he could become a "big asset" for the club. His first goals for the Nailsworth club came in the form of a hat-trick in a 4–1 win over Alfreton Town at The New Lawn. He signed a new contract in March 2012. He went on to score ten goals from 32 games as Forest Green finished tenth in the Conference Premier at the end of the 2011–12 season. He scored 11 goals from 47 appearances in the 2012–13 campaign, with Rovers again finishing tenth, and had his contract extended for another year.

He struggled for form early in the 2013–14 season, being limited to three goals in eight starts and five substitute appearances, and on 31 January was loaned out to fellow Conference Premier club Chester until the end of the season. He continued to train with Rovers in the week as Chester were a part-time club, returning to the Deva Stadium for Chester's weekly training session and for matches. Having scored six times in seven matches for Steve Burr's side, he was recalled by Adrian Pennock at his parent club. He failed to add to his goal tally from another 14 games for Forest Green as the club finished tenth for a third consecutive season. He rejected the club's offer of a new contract.

=== Bristol Rovers ===
On 16 June 2014, Taylor signed a pre-contract agreement with recently relegated Conference Premier club Bristol Rovers, reportedly rejecting offers from former clubs Oxford United and Chester, as well as Mansfield Town and Kidderminster Harriers. He finished the 2014–15 season with 21 goals in 51 games, including one in each of the play-off semi-final matches against former club Forest Green Rovers. He played the full 120 minutes of the play-off final and scored Rovers' second penalty of the shoot-out victory as they secured an immediate return to the Football League.

Taylor scored his first Football League goal in a 3–1 win over Barnet at the Memorial Stadium on 22 August 2015. He was nominated for the League Two Player of the Month award for October after scoring four goals. On 1 December, he scored a 12-minute second-half hat-trick in a 3–0 win over Wycombe Wanderers. He earned another Player of the Month nomination after scoring four goals and providing two assists in December. He scored another hat-trick on 1 March, in a 4–1 win over Hartlepool United. He finally won the Player of the Month award for March after scoring eight goals in seven games. Between 8 March and 16 April he scored in eight successive games, including a brace against Crawley Town. On the final day of the 2015–16 season, Bristol Rovers achieved promotion out of League Two by scoring a dramatic winner in the 92nd-minute; Lee Brown scored the decisive goal after Taylor himself hit the post. Taylor finished the season with 28 goals and nine assists in 50 appearances. He was League Two's top scorer and was voted onto the PFA Team of the Year.

Taylor signed a new contract in July 2016 and stated that if he were to leave the club then Rovers would receive a fee and he could therefore "leave by the front door, with my head held high". He proceeded to score on his League One debut in a 3–1 defeat at Scunthorpe United on 6 August. On 18 October, he scored a second-half hat-trick to earn a point for Rovers in a 3–3 draw with Milton Keynes Dons. He made 33 appearances in the 2016–17 campaign, scoring 19 goals, before his departure in January.

=== Bristol City ===
On 31 January 2017, Taylor left Bristol Rovers to join local derby rivals Bristol City, who activated his release clause, reported to be £300,000. Taylor became the first player to move directly from Bristol Rovers to Bristol City since Trevor Morgan in 1987. In October 2017, as part of an interview for the BBC Points West programme, Bristol City manager Lee Johnson described how he received a death threat during the 2016–17 season after signing Taylor. During this episode, Johnson moved house after his family's home address was put online. On 11 February 2017, Taylor made his first start for Bristol City, in a league match away to Derby County. He scored his first goal for the club in the 14th minute, firing home from close range after teammate Aden Flint saw his header cleared off the line. Taylor would go on to play a key role in City's next two goals, the match eventually ending 3–3. On-loan youngster Tammy Abraham was the club's main striker, whilst Lee Tomlin and Aaron Wilbraham provided strong competition up front, which limited Taylor to nine starts and six substitute appearances as the 2016–17 campaign drew to a close; he nevertheless scored two goals and provided five assists.

During the 2017–18 season, Bristol City reached the semi-finals of the EFL Cup and Taylor scored in the victories against Premier League opponents Stoke City and Crystal Palace, as well as setting up the 93rd-minute winner in the quarter-final victory over cup holders Manchester United. However, he was limited to just four starts in the Championship as Johnson preferred to use Famara Diédhiou and Bobby Decordova-Reid. He was again restricted mainly to appearances off the bench in 2018–19, contributing four goals and five assists from ten starts and 23 substitute appearances in the league. Johnson looked to move Taylor on in the summer of 2019 after the acquisition of Benik Afobe and Antoine Semenyo's elevation to the first team.

=== Oxford United ===
On 19 August 2019, Taylor joined Oxford United – by now in League One – on loan until the end of the 2019–20 season. He made his debut the following day in a 4–2 defeat to Burton Albion, and scored his first goal in a 6–0 win at Lincoln City on 21 September. On 25 September, he scored a goal and provided an assist in a 4–0 win over Premier League West Ham United at the Kassam Stadium in the third round of the EFL Cup. Oxford were eliminated at the quarter-finals by eventual winners Manchester City, with Taylor scoring Oxford's goal in a 3–1 home defeat. He was named as the EFL League One Player of the Month for February, having scored seven goals in as many games, helping Oxford to make a late push for the play-offs. He finished the COVID-affected 2019–20 season as top scorer for the club, scoring 17 goals in 37 games. United reached the play-off final, losing 2–1 to Wycombe Wanderers behind closed doors at Wembley Stadium.

On 31 July 2020, he signed a three-year permanent deal with Oxford. He was again the club's top scorer in the 2020–21 season with a total of 19 goals in 52 appearances, including a strike against Blackpool in the play-off semi-final, which ended in a 6–3 aggregate defeat. He scored 22 goals in 46 games in the 2021–22 campaign, though this time Oxford missed out on the play-offs after an eighth-place finish. On 22 October 2022, he was sent off in a 2–1 home defeat to Peterborough United.

He was deemed surplus to requirements by head coach Karl Robinson after Ateef Konaté and Tyler Smith were signed in the January 2023 transfer window to compete with Gatlin O'Donkor, Kyle Joseph, Billy Bodin, Sam Baldock and Marcus Browne for a starting place. On 31 January, Taylor joined League One rivals Port Vale on loan until the end of the 2022–23 season. He had scored six goals in 29 games during the first half of the campaign, including a brace in a 4–0 win over the Vale. The move reunited him with Darrell Clarke, his former manager at Bristol Rovers, who needed reinforcements up front following injury concerns to James Wilson, Ellis Harrison and Jamie Proctor; as well as previously under Clarke, Taylor had been good friends with Harrison for many years and was pleased to finally become a teammate. He made his debut at Vale Park two weeks later as a substitute, after having recovered from an impact injury picked up at Rovers. It took him six games to score his first goal at Port Vale, though he was praised for his "clear know-how and understanding of the level". Taylor's contract with Oxford was not renewed at the end of the 2022–23 season; head coach Liam Manning stated that "Matty Taylor is a club legend and has been here in two spells since he was just a kid, so I am sure the fans will join us in thanking him for everything he has done for the club".

=== Return to Forest Green Rovers ===
On 17 July 2023, Taylor rejoined Forest Green Rovers, now in League Two. He scored two goals in 18 games in his second spell for the club.

=== Cheltenham Town ===
On 1 February 2024, Taylor returned to League One on a two-and-a-half-year contract with Cheltenham Town in a move that again reunited him with manager Darrell Clarke, who had reportedly made him his number one priority for the transfer window. He scored on his debut at Whaddon Road, a 3–1 defeat to Wycombe Wanderers, and also scored in the following game to secure a 1–0 victory at Cambridge United. He scored four goals in eight games before being sidelined with a hamstring injury. He recovered to finish the campaign with seven goals, though this was not enough to prevent the club from being relegated into League Two. On 15 February 2025, he came off the bench to score a brace at Whaddon Road, securing a 3–2 home win over Barrow. He ended the 2024–25 campaign with seven goals in 45 appearances.

=== Later career ===
On 18 July 2025, Taylor joined National League South club Salisbury, managed by former Bristol Rovers assistant Brian Dutton. He left the club by mutual consent in February 2026 after four goal contributions in 20 appearances, shortly afterwards taking up a coaching role at Oxford United and joining the playing staff of Oxford City. He scored five goals in 12 games for City during the 2025–26 campaign.

== International career ==
On 21 May 2014, Taylor scored two goals for England C in a 2–2 draw with Sparta Prague B in a behind closed doors friendly match in which no caps were awarded. He scored in a 4–2 defeat to Hungary U19 seven days later.

== Coaching career ==
After leaving Salisbury in February 2026, Taylor returned to Oxford United to take up a role as an academy coach.

== Career statistics ==
As of match played 25 April 2026

Appearances and goals by club, season and competition
| Club | Season | League | | | FA Cup | | League Cup | | Other | | Total | |
| Club | Season | Division | Apps | Goals | Apps | Goals | Apps | Goals | Apps | Goals | Apps | Goals |
|---|---|---|---|---|---|---|---|---|---|---|---|---|
| Oxford United | 2007–08 | Conference Premier | 3 | 0 | 0 | 0 | — | | 1 (Note: Appearance in Conference League Cup) | 0 | 4 | 0 |
| Oxford United | 2008–09 | Conference Premier | 4 | 0 | 2 | 0 | — | | 1 | 0 | 7 | 0 |
| Oxford United | Total | | 7 | 0 | 2 | 0 | 0 | 0 | 2 | 0 | 11 | 0 |
| Forest Green Rovers | 2011–12 | Conference Premier | 29 | 10 | 1 | 0 | — | | 2 (Note: Appearance(s) in FA Trophy) | 0 | 32 | 10 |
| Forest Green Rovers | 2012–13 | Conference Premier | 42 | 9 | 3 | 1 | — | | 2 | 1 | 47 | 11 |
| Forest Green Rovers | 2013–14 | Conference Premier | 25 | 3 | 0 | 0 | — | | 2 | 0 | 27 | 3 |
| Forest Green Rovers | Total | | 96 | 22 | 4 | 1 | 0 | 0 | 6 | 1 | 106 | 24 |
| Chester (loan) | 2013–14 | Conference Premier | 7 | 6 | 0 | 0 | — | | 0 | 0 | 7 | 6 |
| Bristol Rovers | 2014–15 | Conference Premier | 45 | 18 | 2 | 1 | — | | 4 (Note: One appearance in FA Trophy, three appearances and two goals in Conference Premier play-offs) | 2 | 51 | 21 |
| Bristol Rovers | 2015–16 | League Two | 46 | 27 | 1 | 0 | 1 | 0 | 2 (Note: Appearance(s) in Football League Trophy / EFL Trophy) | 1 | 50 | 28 |
| Bristol Rovers | 2016–17 | League One | 27 | 16 | 2 | 2 | 2 | 0 | 2 | 1 | 33 | 19 |
| Bristol Rovers | Total | | 118 | 61 | 5 | 3 | 3 | 0 | 8 | 4 | 134 | 68 |
| Bristol City | 2016–17 | Championship | 15 | 2 | 0 | 0 | 0 | 0 | — | | 15 | 2 |
| Bristol City | 2017–18 | Championship | 18 | 1 | 1 | 0 | 4 | 2 | — | | 23 | 3 |
| Bristol City | 2018–19 | Championship | 33 | 4 | 2 | 0 | 1 | 0 | — | | 36 | 4 |
| Bristol City | 2019–20 | Championship | 1 | 0 | 0 | 0 | 0 | 0 | — | | 1 | 0 |
| Bristol City | Total | | 67 | 7 | 3 | 0 | 5 | 2 | 0 | 0 | 75 | 9 |
| Oxford United (loan) | 2019–20 | League One | 26 | 13 | 4 | 1 | 3 | 2 | 4 (Note: One appearance and one goal in EFL Trophy, three appearances in League One play-offs) | 1 | 37 | 17 |
| Oxford United | 2020–21 | League One | 46 | 18 | 1 | 0 | 1 | 0 | 4 (Note: Two appearances in the EFL Trophy, two appearances and one goal in League One play-offs) | 1 | 52 | 19 |
| Oxford United | 2021–22 | League One | 44 | 20 | 2 | 2 | 0 | 0 | 0 | 0 | 46 | 22 |
| Oxford United | 2022–23 | League One | 22 | 3 | 3 | 1 | 1 | 0 | 3 | 2 | 29 | 6 |
| Oxford United | Total | | 138 | 54 | 10 | 4 | 5 | 2 | 11 | 4 | 164 | 64 |
| Port Vale (loan) | 2022–23 | League One | 14 | 4 | — | | — | | — | | 14 | 4 |
| Forest Green Rovers | 2023–24 | League Two | 17 | 2 | 0 | 0 | 0 | 0 | 1 | 0 | 18 | 2 |
| Cheltenham Town | 2023–24 | League One | 13 | 7 | — | | — | | — | | 13 | 7 |
| Cheltenham Town | 2024–25 | League Two | 37 | 5 | 2 | 0 | 1 | 0 | 5 | 2 | 45 | 7 |
| Cheltenham Town | Total | | 50 | 12 | 2 | 0 | 1 | 0 | 5 | 2 | 58 | 14 |
| Salisbury | 2025–26 | National League South | 20 | 2 | 0 | 0 | — | | 0 | 0 | 20 | 2 |
| Oxford City | 2025–26 | National League North | 12 | 5 | — | | — | | — | | 12 | 5 |
| Career total | | | 546 | 175 | 26 | 8 | 14 | 4 | 33 | 11 | 619 | 198 |

== Honours ==
Bristol Rovers

- Football League Two third-place promotion: 2015–16
- Conference Premier play-offs: 2015

Individual

- Football League Two Player of the Month: March 2016
- Bristol Rovers Player of the Year: 2015–16
- PFA Team of the Year: 2015–16 League Two
- EFL League One Player of the Month: February 2020
