= 2025–26 Oxford United F.C. season =

English football club season

Oxford United
2025–26 season
- Owner: Erick Thohir
- Chairman: Grant Ferguson
- Head coach: Gary Rowett (until 23 December); Matt Bloomfield (from 9 January)
- Stadium: Kassam Stadium
- Championship: 22nd (relegated)
- FA Cup: Fourth round
- EFL Cup: Second round
- Top goalscorer: League: Will Lankshear (11); All: Will Lankshear (12)
Home colours	Away colours	Third colours

The 2025–26 season was the 132nd season in the history of Oxford United Football Club and their second consecutive season in the Championship following promotion in the 2023–24 season. In addition to competing in the domestic league, the club also participated in the FA Cup and the EFL Cup. The club finished 23rd in the league table, relegating them to League One.

== Managerial changes ==
On 23 December, Gary Rowett was sacked as head coach after fifty games in charge and a win ratio of 28%. Seventeen days later, the club appointed Matt Bloomfield as the new head coach.

== Transfers ==
=== In ===
Date	Pos.	Player	From	Fee	Ref.
1 July 2025	CDM	(Belgium) Brian De Keersmaecker	(Netherlands) Heracles Almelo	Undisclosed	
10 July 2025	RB	(Northern Ireland) Brodie Spencer	(England) Huddersfield Town	Undisclosed	
24 November 2025	MF	(England) Kaya Halil	(England) Brentford	Free	
9 January 2026	CAM	(England) Myles Peart-Harris	(England) Brentford	Undisclosed	
18 January 2026	CDM	(Northern Ireland) Jamie McDonnell	(England) Nottingham Forest	Undisclosed	
20 January 2026	RW	(South Korea) Jeon Jin-woo	(South Korea) Jeonbuk Hyundai Motors	Undisclosed	
3 February 2026	LW	(Republic of Ireland) Aidomo Emakhu	(England) Millwall	Undisclosed	
24 February 2026	CF	(Slovenia) Nik Prelec	(Italy) Cagliari	Free Transfer	

=== Out ===
Date	Pos.	Player	To	Fee	Ref.
26 June 2025	AM	(Portugal) Rúben Rodrigues	(Brazil) Vitória	Undisclosed	
4 July 2025	CM	(Tunisia) Idris El Mizouni	(England) Leyton Orient	Undisclosed	

=== Loaned in ===
Date	Pos.	Player	From	Date unil	Ref.
25 July 2025	CAM	(Wales) Luke Harris	(England) Fulham	7 January 2026 (Note: On 7 January, Harris was recalled to Fulham to end his initial season-long loan)	
2 August 2025	CF	(Slovenia) Nik Prelec	(Italy) Cagliari	24 February 2026 (Note: On 24 February, Prelec signed on a permanent deal)	
5 August 2025	CF	(England) Will Lankshear	(England) Tottenham Hotspur	31 May 2026	
23 August 2025	CB	(England) Ben Davies	(Scotland) Rangers	31 May 2026	
1 September 2025	LW	(Bulgaria) Filip Krastev	(Belgium) Lommel	5 February 2026 (Note: On 5 February, Krastev was recalled to Lommel from his initial season-long loan)	
2 January 2026	CAM	(Northern Ireland) Jamie Donley	(England) Tottenham Hotspur	31 May 2026	
15 January 2026	CDM	(Turkey) Yunus Konak	(England) Brentford	31 May 2026	
31 January 2026	CB	(Republic of the Congo) Christ Makosso	(England) Luton Town	31 May 2026 (Note: Option to buy)	
2 February 2026	LB	(Netherlands) Ruben Roosken	(England) Huddersfield Town	31 May 2026 (Note: Obligation to buy should certain conditions be met)	

=== Loaned out ===
Date	Pos.	Player	To	Date until	Ref.
19 June 2025	CB	(Scotland) Stuart Findlay	(Scotland) Heart of Midlothian	31 May 2026	
9 July 2025	CF	(England) Will Goodwin	(England) Colchester United	31 May 2026	
17 July 2025	CB	(England) Jordan Thorniley	(England) Northampton Town	5 January 2026 (Note: On 5 January, Thorniley was recalled from his season-long loan at Northampton to continue his rehabilitation from injury)	
11 August 2025	CB	(Republic of Ireland) James Golding	(England) Crewe Alexandra	3 January 2026 (Note: On 3 January, Golding was recalled from his loan at Crewe)	
22 August 2025	RB	(Democratic Republic of the Congo) Peter Kioso	(England) Peterborough United	31 May 2026	
1 September 2025	RW	(England) Owen Dale	(England) Plymouth Argyle	31 May 2026	
1 September 2025	CB	(Republic of Ireland) Stephan Negru	(England) Bristol Rovers	6 January 2026 (Note: On 6 January, Negru was recalled from his season-long loan at Bristol Rovers)	
6 September 2025	CAM	(Indonesia) Marselino Ferdinan	(Slovakia) AS Trenčín	31 May 2026	
26 November 2025	CF	(England) Aidan Elliott-Wheeler	(England) Gateshead	28 February 2026 (Note: On 6 January, Elliott-Wheeler's loan at Gateshead was extended until the end of the season. Then on 28 February he was recalled and subsequently joined Brackley Town on loan)	
19 December 2025	GK	(England) Jacob Knightbridge	(England) AFC Totton	17 January 2026	
2 January 2026	CM	(England) Louie Sibley	(England) Bradford City	31 May 2026	
2 February 2026	CF	(Wales) Tom Bradshaw	(England) Barnsley	31 May 2026	
2 February 2026	CB	(Republic of Ireland) Stephan Negru	(England) Tranmere Rovers	31 May 2026	
16 February 2026	CB	(Republic of Ireland) James Golding	(England) Southend United	31 May 2026	
28 February 2026	RB	(England) Aidan Elliott-Wheeler	(England) Brackley Town	31 May 2026	
27 March 2026	MF	(England) Kaya Halil	(England) Cheshunt	31 May 2026	

=== Released / out of contract ===
Date	Pos.	Player	Subsequent club	Join date	Ref.
30 June 2025	GK	(England) Eddie Brearey	(England) Leamington	1 July 2025	
30 June 2025	CM	(England) Josh McEachran	(England) Bristol Rovers	1 July 2025	
30 June 2025	CM	(England) George Franklin	(England) Bracknell Town	September 2025	
30 June 2025	LB	(England) Joe Bennett	(England) Walton & Hersham	October 2025	
30 June 2025	CF	(England) Max Woltman	(England) Macclesfield	October 2025	
1 September 2025	CB	(England) Elliott Moore	(England) Northampton Town	10 January 2026	
2 February 2026	RW	(Scotland) Matt Phillips	(England) Stevenage	13 February 2026	
3 February 2026	CB	(England) Jordan Thorniley			

=== New contract ===
Date	Pos.	Player	Contract until	Ref.
30 May 2025	CB	(Republic of Ireland) James Golding	Undisclosed	
30 May 2025	CM	(England) Joshua Johnson	Undisclosed	
2 June 2025	RB	(England) Sam Long	Undisclosed	
13 June 2025	CB	(Northern Ireland) Ciaron Brown	Undisclosed	
19 June 2025	GK	(England) Matt Ingram	Undisclosed	
20 June 2025	CF	(Wales) Mark Harris	Undisclosed	
28 June 2025	CF	(England) Leo Snowden	Undisclosed (Note: First professional contract)	
30 June 2025	GK	(England) Jamie Cumming	Undisclosed	
2 July 2025	RW	(Republic of Ireland) Tyler Goodrham	Undisclosed	
27 July 2025	CF	(England) Jack Lee	Undisclosed	
28 August 2025	CB	(England) Aaron Lacey	Undisclosed	
2 September 2025	CF	(England) Kasway Burton	Undisclosed	
18 February 2026	RB	(England) Aidan Elliott-Wheeler	Undisclosed	
31 March 2026	RB	(England) Sam Long	Undisclosed	

== Pre-season and friendlies ==
On 28 May, it was announced that Oxford United would face Maidenhead United in a behind-closed-doors fixture during pre-season. A fortnight later, a second friendly was added, against Mansfield Town. On 17 June, two home pre-season friendlies were announced, against Bristol Rovers and Leganés. A tour to Indonesia was also announced, with fixtures against a Liga Indonesia XI and Arema.

Win Draw Loss Fixtures

6 July 2025 Friendly (Piala Presiden)	Liga Indonesia XI	3–6	Oxford United	Jakarta, Indonesia
19:30 WIB	Simanjuntak 14'; Dwi Febrianto 76'; Runtukahu 80'	Report	M. Harris 3', 30'; Helik 43'; Bradshaw 50'; Płacheta 57'; De Keersmaecker 68'	Stadium: Gelora Bung Karno Main Stadium; Attendance: 41,065

10 July 2025 Friendly (Piala Presiden)	Arema	0–4	Oxford United	Soreang, Indonesia
19:30 WIB		Report	Płacheta 6'; Romeny 10'; Snowden 43'; O'Donkor 70'	Stadium: Jalak Harupat Stadium

13 July 2025 Friendly (Piala Presiden)	Port	2–1	Oxford United	Soreang, Indonesia
19:30 WIB	Teerasak 44'; Perea 48'	Report	M. Harris 8'	Stadium: Jalak Harupat Stadium

15 July 2025 Friendly	Oxford United	v	Maidenhead United	Oxford
12:00 BST				Stadium: Oxford Sports Park; Attendance: 0 (behind closed doors)

22 July 2025 Friendly	Mansfield Town	0–1	Oxford United	Mansfield
19:30 BST		Report	Bradshaw 2'	Stadium: Field Mill; Attendance: 1,476 (90 Away)

26 July 2025 Friendly	Oxford United	0–1	Bristol Rovers	Oxford
15:00 BST		Report	Anthony 77'	Stadium: Kassam Stadium

29 July 2025 Friendly	Oxford United	1–1	Leganés	Oxford
19:00 BST	Bradshaw 25'	Report	Miquel 32'	Stadium: Kassam Stadium; Attendance: 2,085 (106 away)

2 August 2025 Friendly	Oxford United	3–0	Málaga CF	Oxford
15:00 BST	Mills 30'; Brannagan 82' (pen.); Moore 85'	Report		Stadium: Kassam Stadium; Attendance: 3,407

== Competitions ==
=== Overall record ===
Competition	First match	Last match	Starting round	Final position	Record							
Competition	First match	Last match	Starting round	Final position	Pld	W	D	L	GF	GA	GD	Win %
Championship	9 August 2025	2 May 2026	Matchday 1	22nd	45	11	14	20	45	57	−12	24.44
FA Cup	9 January 2026	15 February 2026	Third round	Fourth round	2	0	1	1	1	2	−1	0.00
EFL Cup	12 August 2025	27 August 2025	First round	Second round	2	1	0	1	1	6	−5	50.00
Total					49	12	15	22	47	65	−18	24.49

Last updated: 11 March 2026
Source: Soccerway

=== Championship ===
==== League table ====
Pos	Team	Pld	W	D	L	GF	GA	GD	Pts	Promotion, qualification or relegation
20	Blackburn Rovers	46	13	13	20	42	56	−14	52	
21	West Bromwich Albion	46	13	14	19	48	58	−10	51 (Note: West Bromwich Albion were deducted two points on 24 April 2026 for breaching PSR rules.)	
22	Oxford United (R)	46	11	14	21	45	59	−14	47	Relegation to EFL League One
23	Leicester City (R)	46	12	16	18	58	68	−10	46 (Note: Leicester City were deducted six points on 5 February 2026 for breaching PSR rules.)	Relegation to EFL League One
24	Sheffield Wednesday (R)	46	2	12	32	29	89	−60	0 (Note: Sheffield Wednesday were deducted twelve points due to filing for administration on 24 October 2025, then deducted a further six points on 1 December 2025 for failing to fulfil payment obligations.)	Relegation to EFL League One

Source: EFL Official Website
Rules for classification: 1) Points; 2) Goal difference; 3) Number of goals scored; 4) Head-to-head results; 5) Wins; 6) Away goals; 7) Penalty points (sec 9.5); 8) Number of 12-point sending off offences; 9) Play-off (only if needed to determine promotion/relegation)
(R) Relegated

==== Results summary ====
Overall								Home						Away					
Pld	W	D	L	GF	GA	GD	Pts	W	D	L	GF	GA	GD	W	D	L	GF	GA	GD
46	11	14	21	45	59	−14	47	7	8	8	24	27	−3	4	6	13	21	32	−11

Last updated: complete.
Source: Soccerway

==== Results by round ====
Round	1	2	3	4	5	6	7	8	9	10	11	12	13	14	15	16	17	18	19	20	21	22	23	24	25	27	28	29	30	26^{1}	31	32	33	34	35	36	37	38	39	40	41	42	43	44	45	46
Ground	H	A	A	H	H	A	H	A	A	H	A	A	H	H	A	H	A	H	A	A	H	A	H	H	A	H	H	A	H	A	A	H	A	A	H	A	H	H	A	H	A	H	A	H	H	A
Result	L	L	L	D	D	W	L	D	L	W	L	W	D	L	L	D	D	W	L	D	L	L	W	L	L	D	D	W	L	L	D	L	D	L	W	W	W	D	L	D	D	W	L	L	W	L
Position	20	20	23	22	22	20	22	21	22	19	20	19	20	21	21	21	21	20	21	21	22	22	21	22	23	23	23	23	23	23	23	23	23	23	23	23	22	22	23	23	23	22	22	22	22	22
Points	0	0	0	1	2	5	5	6	6	9	9	12	12	12	13	14	15	18	18	19	19	19	22	22	22	23	24	27	27	27	28	28	29	29	32	35	38	39	39	40	41	44	44	44	47	47

Source: EFL
A = Away; H = Home; W = Win; D = Draw; L = Loss; P = Postponed
Notes:
- ^{1} Matchday 26 (vs Sheffield United) was postponed due to a frozen pitch.

==== Matches ====
On 26 June, the Championship fixtures were announced.

Win Draw Loss Fixtures

9 August 2025 1	Oxford United	0–1	Portsmouth	Oxford
15:00 BST	Goodrham (yellow card) 64'	Report	Segečić 38'; Swift (yellow card) 41'; Ogilvie (yellow card) 63'	Stadium: Kassam Stadium; Attendance: 11,492 (1,490 away); Referee: Dean Whitestone

17 August 2025 2	Hull City	3–2	Oxford United	Kingston upon Hull
15:00 BST	Gelhardt 2'; Crooks 20'; McBurnie 90+3'; Crooks (yellow card) 27'	Report	Lankshear 9'; Brannagan 26'; Spencer (yellow card) 12'	Stadium: MKM Stadium; Attendance: 20,667; Referee: Andrew Kitchen
Note: Fixture was originally scheduled for 16 August, but was moved due to a clash of events at the stadium.

23 August 2025 3	Birmingham City	1–0	Oxford United	Bordesley
15:00 BST	Paik Seung-ho 41'	Report		Stadium: St. Andrew's; Attendance: 27,342; Referee: Robert Jones

30 August 2025 4	Oxford United	2–2	Coventry City	Oxford
15:00 BST	Lankshear 19'; Brannagan (yellow card) 55', (goal) 75'	Report	Wright 12'; Torp 37', (yellow card) 88'; Thomas (yellow card) 49'	Stadium: Kassam Stadium; Attendance: 11,229 (1,514 away); Referee: Ruebyn Ricardo

13 September 2025 5	Oxford United	2–2	Leicester City	Oxford
12:30 BST	Lankshear 9'; Soumaré 44' (o.g.); Long (yellow card) 63'	Report	Soumaré (yellow card) 3'; Ayew 13'; Ramsey (red card) 24'; Vestergaard (yellow card) 50'; Pereira 55'	Stadium: Kassam Stadium; Attendance: 11,362; Referee: Ben Toner
Note: Fixture was originally scheduled for a 15:00 kick-off, but was moved for live Sky Sports broadcasting.

21 September 2025 6	Bristol City	1–3	Oxford United	Bristol
15:00 BST	Mehmeti 54'; Knight (yellow card) 55'; Vítek (yellow card) 74'; Vyner (yellow card) 76'; Dickie (yellow card) 89'	Report	Prelec 19'; Płacheta 45+2'; Vaulks (yellow card) 76'; Leigh 90'	Stadium: Ashton Gate; Attendance: 23,440; Referee: John Brooks
Note: Fixture was originally scheduled for 20 September, but was moved due to a clash of events at the stadium.

27 September 2025 7	Oxford United	0–1	Sheffield United	Oxford
15:00 BST	Vaulks (yellow card) 84'	Report	O'Hare 65'; Burrows (yellow card) 75'	Stadium: Kassam Stadium; Attendance: 11,352 (1,439 away); Referee: Benjamin Speedie

30 September 2025 8	Queens Park Rangers	0–0	Oxford United	Shepherd's Bush
20:00 BST	Mbengue (yellow card) 74'; Burrell (yellow card) 87'; Norrington-Davies (yellow card) 90+3'	Report	L. Harris (yellow card) 85'	Stadium: Loftus Road; Attendance: 15,470; Referee: Ruebyn Ricardo
Note: Fixture was originally scheduled for a 19:45 kick-off, but was moved due for live Sky Sports broadcasting.

4 October 2025 9	Watford	2–1	Oxford United	Watford
15:00 BST	Keben (yellow card) 39'; Ngakia 45', 45+4'; Kjerrumgaard (yellow card) 49'; Louza (yellow card) 53'	Report	Alleyne 3' (o.g.); Brannagan (yellow card) 5'; Mills (yellow card) 30'; Helik (yellow card) 45+5'; Currie (yellow card) 90+2'	Stadium: Vicarage Road; Attendance: 19,187; Referee: Lewis Smith

18 October 2025 10	Oxford United	1–0	Derby County	Oxford
12:30 BST	Mills 24'; Currie (yellow card) 43'; Vaulks (yellow card) 55'; Brannagan (yellow card) 72'; Brown (yellow card) 86'	Report	Clarke (yellow card) 59'	Stadium: Kassam Stadium; Attendance: 11,197 (1,484 away); Referee: Gavin Ward
Note: Fixture was originally scheduled for a 15:00 kick-off, but was moved due for live Sky Sports broadcasting.

21 October 2025 11	Wrexham	1–0	Oxford United	Wrexham
19:45 BST	Broadhead 14'; Hyam (yellow card) 37'; Doyle (red card) 67'; Moore (yellow card) 83'; Smith (yellow card) 90+6'	Report	Dembélé (yellow card) 65'	Stadium: Racecourse Ground; Attendance: 10,547; Referee: Elliot Bell

25 October 2025 12	Sheffield Wednesday	1–2	Oxford United	Owlerton
15:00 BST	Fusire 53'	Report	Lankshear 12'; Brannagan 36'	Stadium: Hillsborough Stadium; Attendance: 27,261; Referee: Paul Tierney

1 November 2025 13	Oxford United	2–2	Millwall	Oxford
15:00 GMT	Branangan 45'; Płacheta 90+6'	Report	Ballo 11'; Cooper 66'	Stadium: Kassam Stadium; Attendance: 11,023 (1,478 away); Referee: Farai Hallam

4 November 2025 14	Oxford United	0–3	Stoke City	Oxford
19:45 GMT	Brown (yellow card) 40'	Report	Baker 10', 48'; Nzonzi 32', (yellow card) 59'; Phillips (yellow card) 74'; Tchamadeu (yellow card) 83'	Stadium: Kassam Stadium; Attendance: 10,362 (1,396 away); Referee: Leigh Doughty

8 November 2025 15	West Bromwich Albion	2–1	Oxford United	West Bromwich
15:00 GMT	Leigh 56' (o.g.); Heggebø 70'	Report	Lankshear 54'	Stadium: The Hawthorns; Attendance: 22,898; Referee: Jacob Miles

22 November 2025 16	Oxford United	1–1	Middlesbrough	Oxford
15:00 GMT	L. Harris (yellow card) 15', (goal) 28'; De Keersmaecker (yellow card) 40'; M. Harris (yellow card) 83'	Report	Browne (yellow card) 34'; Whittaker 54'; Sène (yellow card) 87'	Stadium: Kassam Stadium; Attendance: 11,138 (1,476 away); Referee: Ben Toner

25 November 2025 17	Norwich City	1–1	Oxford United	Norwich
19:45 GMT	Makama 29'; Fisher (yellow card) 89'	Report	Krastev 90+5'	Stadium: Carrow Road; Attendance: 24,922; Referee: Tom Reeves
Note: Fixture was originally scheduled for 26 November, but was moved due to also playing on the Friday.

28 November 2025 18	Oxford United	2–1	Ipswich Town	Oxford
20:00 GMT	M. Harris 24'; Płacheta 77'	Report	Davis 53'	Stadium: Kassam Stadium; Attendance: 11,307 (1,498 away); Referee: Matt Donohue
Note: Fixture was originally scheduled for 29 November, but was moved for live Sky Sports broadcasting.

6 December 2025 19	Swansea City	2–0	Oxford United	Landore
15:00 GMT	Stamenić 40'; Tymon (yellow card) 43', (goal) 45+4'; Franco (yellow card) 61'	Report	L. Harris (yellow card) 43'; Krastev (yellow card) 45'; Currie (yellow card) 75'; Lankshear (yellow card) 84'	Stadium: Swansea.com Stadium; Attendance: 17,318; Referee: Anthony Backhouse

9 December 2025 20	Blackburn Rovers	1–1	Oxford United	Blackburn
19:45 GMT	Tavares (yellow card) 56'; Cantwell 78' (pen.)	Report	De Keersmaecker (yellow card) 41'; Brown 45+1'; M. Harris (yellow card) 87'	Stadium: Ewood Park; Attendance: 10,255; Referee: Leigh Doughty

13 December 2025 21	Oxford United	1–2	Preston North End	Oxford
12:30 GMT	Vaulks (yellow card) 43'; De Keersmaecker 53'	Report	Storey 26'; Jebbison 49', (yellow card) 78'; Whiteman (yellow card) 90'	Stadium: Kassam Stadium; Attendance: 10,379; Referee: James Linington
Note: Fixture was originally scheduled for a 15:00 kick-off, but was moved for live Sky Sports broadcasting.

20 December 2025 22	Charlton Athletic	1–0	Oxford United	Charlton
15:00 GMT	Kelman 78'; Jones (yellow card) 80'; Leaburn (yellow card) 90+8'	Report	De Keersmaecker (yellow card) 31'	Stadium: The Valley; Attendance: 19,594; Referee: Elliot Bell

26 December 2025 23	Oxford United	2–1	Southampton	Oxford
15:00 GMT	Spencer (yellow card) 8'; Goodrham 23'; Mills 89', (yellow card) 90'	Report	Harwood-Bellis 29'; Downes (yellow card) 37'	Stadium: Kassam Stadium; Attendance: 11,500; Referee: Leigh Doughty

29 December 2025 24	Oxford United	0–1	Swansea City	Oxford
19:45 GMT	Goodrham (yellow card) 13'; Currie (yellow card) 69'	Report	Vipotnik 13'; Widell (yellow card) 35'; Inoussa (yellow card) 53'; Stamenić (yellow card) 73'; Eom Ji-sung (yellow card) 75'	Stadium: Kassam Stadium; Attendance: 11,413 (1,422 away); Referee: Adam Herczeg

1 January 2026 25	Ipswich Town	2–1	Oxford United	Ipswich
15:00 GMT	Philogene 17'; Akpom 40', (yellow card) 56'	Report	Dembélé (yellow card) 27'; Lankshear 34'; Brown (yellow card) 56'; Helik (yellow card) 61'; Vaulks (yellow card) 75'	Stadium: Portman Road; Attendance: 28,199; Referee: Will Finnie

17 January 2026 27	Oxford United	0–0	Bristol City	Oxford
15:00 GMT	Mills (yellow card) 18'; Konak (yellow card) 29'	Report	Morsy (yellow card) 25'; Dickie (yellow card) 53'; Pring (yellow card) 79'	Stadium: Kassam Stadium; Attendance: 11,160 (1,492 away); Referee: Tim Robinson

20 January 2026 28	Oxford United	0–0	Queens Park Rangers	Oxford
19:45 GMT	Vaulks (yellow card) 58'	Report	Dembélé (yellow card) 55'; Smyth (yellow card) 58'	Stadium: Kassam Stadium; Attendance: 10,478 (1,498 away); Referee: Will Finnie

24 January 2026 29	Leicester City	1–2	Oxford United	Leicester
15:00 GMT	Fatawu 84'	Report	Long 4'; Brannagan (yellow card) 44'; Currie (yellow card) 59'; Harris 71'; Phillips (yellow card) 85'	Stadium: King Power Stadium; Referee: James Linington

31 January 2026 30	Oxford United	0–2	Birmingham City	Oxford
15:00 GMT	Spencer (yellow card) 22'; McDonnell (yellow card) 41'	Report	Peart-Harris 23' (o.g.); Stansfield (yellow card) 57'; Iwata (yellow card) 61'; Ducksch 66'	Stadium: Kassam Stadium; Attendance: 11,509 (1,515 away); Referee: Stephen Martin

3 February 2026 26	Sheffield United	3–1	Oxford United	Sheffield
19:45 GMT	Arblaster (yellow card) 17'; Peck 41', (yellow card) 90+1'; Brooks 66'; Ogbene 83'; Cannon (yellow card) 88'	Report	Peart-Harris 13'; Vaulks (yellow card) 43'; Brannagan (yellow card) 76'; Makosso (yellow card) 80'; Konak (yellow card) 90+1'	Stadium: Bramall Lane; Attendance: 26,436; Referee: Anthony Backhouse
Note: Fixture was originally scheduled for 4 January, but it was postponed due to a frozen pitch.

7 February 2026 31	Coventry City	0–0	Oxford United	Coventry
15:00 GMT	Sakamoto (yellow card) 41'	Report	Brown (yellow card) 34'; Long (yellow card) 45'; Brannagan (yellow card) 49'; Lankshear (yellow card) 59' (yellow-red card) 77'; Cumming (yellow card) 67'; Spencer (yellow card) 73'; Romeny (yellow card) 89'	Stadium: Coventry Building Society Arena; Attendance: 30,218; Referee: Ruebyn Ricardo

10 February 2026 32	Oxford United	0–3	Norwich City	Oxford
19:45 GMT	Peart-Harris (yellow card) 90+3'	Report	Touré 1', 19', 47'; Chrisene (yellow card) 53'	Stadium: Kassam Stadium; Attendance: 10,211; Referee: Sam Allison
Note: Fixture was initially scheduled for 14 February, but was rearranged due to both clubs' participation in the FA Cup fourth round.

21 February 2026 33	Middlesbrough	0–0	Oxford United	Middlesbrough
15:00 GMT	Morris (yellow card) 39'; Targett (yellow card) 75'; Gilbert (yellow card) 86'	Report	Brannagan (yellow card) 62'	Stadium: Riverside Stadium; Attendance: 28,918; Referee: Oliver Langford

25 February 2026 34	Stoke City	2–1	Oxford United	Stoke-on-Trent
20:00 GMT	Talovierov (yellow card) 10'; Cissé 36'; Wilmot (yellow card) 53'; Rak-Sakyi 57'	Report	Brown 44'; Vaulks (yellow card) 89'	Stadium: bet365 Stadium; Attendance: 20,153; Referee: James Linington
Note: Fixture was initially scheduled for a 15:00 kick-off, but was rescheduled for live Sky Sports broadcasting.

28 February 2026 35	Oxford United	2–1	West Bromwich Albion	Oxford
15:00 GMT	Mills 14'; Lankshear 26'	Report	Bostock 33'; Wallace (yellow card) 36'; Bielik (yellow card) 90+6'	Stadium: Kassam Stadium; Attendance: 11,054 (1,493 away); Referee: Matt Corlett

6 March 2026 36	Preston North End	1–3	Oxford United	Preston
20:00 GMT	Osmajić 12'; Storey (yellow card) 90+4'	Report	Helik 5'; Brown (yellow card) 22', (goal) 61'; Lankshear 55'	Stadium: Deepdale; Attendance: 14,009; Referee: Andrew Kitchen
Note: Fixture was originally scheduled for 7 March, but was brought forward a day for live Sky Sports broadcasting.

11 March 2026 37	Oxford United	1–0	Blackburn Rovers	Oxford
19:45 GMT	Donley 34'	Report	McLoughlin (yellow card) 27'; Carter (yellow card) 89'	Stadium: Kassam Stadium; Attendance: 9,993 (720 away); Referee: David Webb

14 March 2026 38	Oxford United	1–1	Charlton Athletic	Oxford
12:30 GMT	Helik (yellow card) 38'; Brannagan 57' (pen.); Mills (yellow card) 77'; Brown (yellow card) 90+1'	Report	Chambers (yellow card) 30'; Clarke (yellow card) 50'; Bell (yellow card) 66'; Kelman 90+3' (pen.); Rankin-Costello (yellow card) 90+5'	Stadium: Kassam Stadium; Attendance: 11,325 (1,506 away); Referee: Matthew Donohue
Note: Fixture was initially scheduled for a 15:00 kick-off, but was brought forward for Sky Sports broadcasting.

21 March 2026 39	Southampton	2–0	Oxford United	Southampton
15:00 GMT	Larin 6'; Charles 13'	Report	Mills (yellow card) 31'; Spencer (yellow card) 79'; Helik (yellow card) 89'	Stadium: St Mary's Stadium; Attendance: 30,428; Referee: Ben Toner

3 April 2026 40	Oxford United	1–1	Hull City	Oxford
15:00 GMT	Brannagan 13' (pen.)	Report	Belloumi 4'; Hughes (yellow card) 12'	Stadium: Kassam Stadium; Attendance: 11,477 (1,467 away); Referee: Oliver Langford

6 April 2026 41	Portsmouth	2–2	Oxford United	Milton
12:30 BST	Anderson 9'; Ogilvie (red card) 17'; Dozzell (yellow card) 62', (goal) 87'; Pack (yellow card) 65'	Report	Spencer 48', (yellow card) 59'; Vaulks (yellow card) 61'; Helik (yellow card) 78'; Lankshear 81'	Stadium: Fratton Park; Attendance: 20,356 (2,196 away); Referee: Josh Smith
Note: Fixture was initially scheduled for a 15:00 kick-off, but was brought forward for Sky Sports broadcasting.

11 April 2026 42	Oxford United	2–0	Watford	Oxford
15:00 BST	Peart-Harris 19', (yellow card) 59'; Harris 90+2'	Report	Irankunda (yellow card) 57'; Louza (yellow card) 71'	Stadium: Kassam Stadium; Attendance: 11,223 (1,400 away); Referee: Stephen Martin

18 April 2026 43	Derby County	1–0	Oxford United	Derby
12:30 BST	Banel 22'; Ozoh (yellow card) 26'; Szmodics (yellow card) 76'; Fraulo (yellow card) 87'; Murkin (yellow card) 88'	Report	Brannagan (yellow card) 80'	Stadium: Pride Park Stadium; Attendance: 29,281; Referee: Sam Allison
Note: Fixture was initially scheduled for a 15:00 kick-off, but was brought forward for Sky Sports broadcasting.

21 April 2026 44	Oxford United	0–1	Wrexham	Oxford
19:45 BST	Emakhu (yellow card) 62'; Mills (yellow card) 90+2'	Report	Longman (yellow card) 32'; Windass 40'; Kaboré (yellow card) 66'; Dobson (yellow card) 90+4'	Stadium: Kassam Stadium; Attendance: 11,128 (1,159 away); Referee: Matthew Donohue

25 April 2026 45	Oxford United	4–1	Sheffield Wednesday	Oxford
15:00 BST	Lankshear 5', 27'; Vaulks 67'; Peart-Harris 73'; Spencer (yellow card) 82'	Report	Grainger 72'	Stadium: Kassam Stadium; Attendance: 11,476 (1,500 away); Referee: Bobby Madley

2 May 2026 46	Millwall	2–0	Oxford United	Bermondsey
12:30 BST	Azeez 34', 48'; Ballo (yellow card) 39'	Report		Stadium: The Den; Attendance: 18,043; Referee: Anthony Backhouse

=== FA Cup ===
Oxford were drawn away to Milton Keynes Dons in the third round and at home to Sunderland in the fourth round.

Win Draw Loss Fixtures

9 January 2026 Third round	Milton Keynes Dons	1–1 (a.e.t.) (3–4 p)	Oxford United	Denbigh
19:30 GMT	Collins 34'; Paterson (yellow card) 96'	Report	Lankshear 52'	Stadium: Stadium MK; Attendance: 5,902 (2,080 away); Referee: Paul Howard
	Penalties
	Sanders (penalty scored); Leko (penalty missed); Matete (penalty scored); Paterson (penalty scored); Lemonheigh-Evans (penalty missed)		Romeny (penalty scored); Harris (penalty scored); Peart-Harris (penalty scored); Phillips (penalty scored)

15 February 2026 Fourth round	Oxford United	0–1	Sunderland	Littlemore
14:00 GMT	Vaulks (yellow card) 40'; Brannagan (yellow card) 61'	Report	Diarra 32' (pen.); Le Fée (yellow card) 33'; Hume (yellow card) 36'; Isidor (yellow card) 50'; O'Nien (yellow card) 69'; Sadiki (yellow card) 90+4'	Stadium: Kassam Stadium; Attendance: 9,879; Referee: Thomas Kirk

=== EFL Cup ===
Oxford were drawn at home to Colchester United in the first round and to Brighton & Hove Albion in the second round.

Win Draw Loss Fixtures

12 August 2025 First round	Oxford United	1–0	Colchester United	Oxford
19:45 BST	Goodrham 9'; Brannagan (yellow card) 83'; M. Harris (yellow card) 89'; Spencer (yellow card) 90+1'	Report	Perry (yellow card) 58'; Tovide (yellow card) 83'; Lisbie (yellow card) 90+2'	Stadium: Kassam Stadium; Attendance: 3,452 (483 away); Referee: Jacob Miles

27 August 2025 Second round	Oxford United	0–6	Brighton & Hove Albion	Oxford
19:45 BST	Mills (yellow card) 40'	Report	Boscagli 13'; Gruda 20'; Gómez 60'; Tzimas 71', 77'; Watson 86'	Stadium: Kassam Stadium; Attendance: 9,010 (1,460 away); Referee: Oliver Langford

== Statistics ==
=== Appearances and goals ===
Players with no appearances are not included on the list, italics indicate a loaned in player

No.	Pos	Nat	Player	Total		Championship		FA Cup		EFL Cup	
No.	Pos	Nat	Player	Apps	Goals	Apps	Goals	Apps	Goals	Apps	Goals
1	GK	(England) ENG	Jamie Cumming	47	0	46+0	0	0+0	0	1+0	0
2	DF	(England) ENG	Sam Long	43	1	34+6	1	1+0	0	2+0	0
3	DF	(Northern Ireland) NIR	Ciaron Brown	38	3	37+0	3	1+0	0	0+0	0
4	MF	(Wales) WAL	Will Vaulks	42	1	18+21	1	2+0	0	1+0	0
5	MF	(Turkey) TUR	Yunus Emre Konak	16	0	12+4	0	0+0	0	0+0	0
6	DF	(Poland) POL	Michał Helik	45	1	42+1	1	1+0	0	1+0	0
7	FW	(Poland) POL	Przemysław Płacheta	27	3	14+11	3	0+1	0	1+0	0
8	MF	(England) ENG	Cameron Brannagan	40	6	35+1	6	2+0	0	2+0	0
9	FW	(Wales) WAL	Mark Harris	41	3	10+28	3	0+1	0	1+1	0
10	FW	(Republic of Ireland) IRL	Aidomo Emakhu	12	0	5+6	0	0+1	0	0+0	0
11	FW	(Indonesia) IDN	Ole Romeny	18	0	2+14	0	0+2	0	0+0	0
12	DF	(Netherlands) NED	Ruben Roosken	4	0	2+1	0	0+1	0	0+0	0
14	MF	(Belgium) BEL	Brian De Keersmaecker	28	2	25+1	2	0+1	0	0+1	0
15	DF	(Northern Ireland) NIR	Brodie Spencer	32	1	23+6	1	1+0	0	1+1	0
16	FW	(Slovenia) SLO	Nik Prelec	25	1	12+12	1	0+0	0	0+1	0
17	FW	(England) ENG	Stanley Mills	46	3	29+14	3	2+0	0	1+0	0
18	MF	(England) ENG	Louie Sibley	5	0	0+3	0	0+0	0	0+2	0
19	FW	(Republic of Ireland) IRL	Tyler Goodrham	14	2	9+4	1	0+0	0	1+0	1
20	FW	(Wales) WAL	Tom Bradshaw	7	0	0+5	0	0+0	0	1+1	0
21	GK	(England) ENG	Matt Ingram	3	0	0+0	0	2+0	0	1+0	0
22	DF	(Jamaica) JAM	Greg Leigh	16	1	10+6	1	0+0	0	0+0	0
23	FW	(Scotland) SCO	Siriki Dembélé	21	0	4+15	0	1+0	0	1+0	0
24	DF	(Netherlands) NED	Hidde ter Avest	14	0	7+6	0	0+0	0	1+0	0
26	DF	(England) ENG	Jack Currie	34	0	25+5	0	2+0	0	2+0	0
27	FW	(England) ENG	Will Lankshear	47	12	34+10	11	2+0	1	1+0	0
29	DF	(England) ENG	Ben Davies	11	0	7+3	0	1+0	0	0+0	0
32	FW	(South Korea) KOR	Jeon Jin-woo	8	0	2+5	0	1+0	0	0+0	0
33	MF	(Northern Ireland) NIR	Jamie Donley	15	1	10+3	1	2+0	0	0+0	0
37	DF	(Republic of the Congo) CGO	Christ Makosso	7	0	5+1	0	1+0	0	0+0	0
38	MF	(Northern Ireland) NIR	Jamie McDonnell	12	0	6+5	0	0+1	0	0+0	0
39	FW	(England) ENG	Gatlin O'Donkor	2	0	0+1	0	0+0	0	0+1	0
44	MF	(Jamaica) JAM	Myles Peart-Harris	20	3	18+1	3	0+1	0	0+0	0
Players who featured but departed the club during the season:
5	DF	(England) ENG	Elliott Moore	4	0	2+0	0	0+0	0	1+1	0
10	FW	(Scotland) SCO	Matt Phillips	11	0	3+5	0	0+1	0	2+0	0
12	MF	(Wales) WAL	Luke Harris	16	1	7+8	1	0+0	0	0+1	0
50	FW	(Bulgaria) BUL	Filip Krastev	17	1	10+6	1	0+1	0	0+0	0
