= Stephan Negru =

Irish footballer (born 2002)

Personal information
- Full name: Stephan Negru
- Date of birth: 24 July 2002 (age 24)
- Place of birth: Dublin, Ireland
- Height: 1.86 m (6 ft 1 in)
- Position: Defender

Team information
- Current team: Swindon Town
- Number: 5

Youth career
- Lourdes Celtic
- 2017–2022: Shelbourne

Senior career*
| Years | Team | Apps | (Gls) |
| 2022 | Shelbourne | 6 | (1) |
| 2023–2026 | Oxford United | 15 | (0) |
| 2024–2025 | → Salford City (loan) | 20 | (0) |
| 2025 | → Salford City (loan) | 10 | (0) |
| 2025–2026 | → Bristol Rovers (loan) | 5 | (0) |
| 2026 | → Tranmere Rovers (loan) | 14 | (0) |
| 2026– | Swindon Town | 14 | (0) |

International career^{‡}
| 2026– | Moldova | 2 | (0) |
- * Club domestic league appearances and goals as of 13:36, 22 November 2026 (UTC) ‡ National team caps and goals as of 16 November 2026

Stephan Negru (born 24 July 2002) is a professional footballer who plays as a defender for EFL League Two club Swindon Town. Born in Ireland, he plays for the Moldova national team.

== Club career ==
=== Early career ===
Born in Dublin, Negru started his career with Lourdes Celtic, before moving to Shelbourne in 2017. Having spent six years playing youth football for Shelbourne, he made his debut in August 2022, playing 90 minutes in a 4–0 FAI Cup win over Bonagee United. He marked his debut in the League of Ireland Premier Division with a goal; the equaliser in a 1–1 draw with Finn Harps.

=== Oxford United ===
On 15 December 2022, it was announced that Negru would join EFL League One side Oxford United on 1 January 2023. Upon joining, he stated his intention to progress to the first team as soon as possible. He was named on the bench for Oxford United's FA Cup tie against Arsenal, but did not feature as his side lost 3–0. He made his first-team and League One debut as a second-half substitute in a 1–1 draw with Sheffield Wednesday on 7 April 2023, and his full debut in the following match, a goalless away draw at Port Vale on 9 April, in which he suffered a suspected broken nose, though later scans showed there was no fracture.

After an injury to Jordan Thorniley early in the 2023–24 season led to a run of first-team appearances, Negru's promising form reportedly attracted interest from Premier League teams, prompting the club to extend his contract in September 2023.

In June 2024 he signed on loan for Salford City for the 2024–25 season. On 8 January 2025 his season-long loan was terminated and he was recalled to Oxford United amid a defensive injury crisis at his parent club. On 23 January however, he returned on loan to Salford City for the remainder of the season.

On 1 September 2025, Negru joined League Two club Bristol Rovers on a season-long loan. In February 2026 he moved on loan to Tranmere Rovers.

On 11 May 2026 Oxford said the player would leave in the summer when his contract expired.

=== Swindon Town ===
Following his release from Oxford, he signed for Swindon Town on 23 June 2026, with effect from 1 July.

== International career ==
Born in Ireland, Negru is of Moldovan descent.

On 18 March 2026, Negru received his first call up to the senior Moldova squad for the friendly matches against Lithuania and Cyprus. On 30 March 2026, Negru made his international debut for Moldova, coming on as a second-half substitute in a 2–3 loss to Cyprus.

== Style of play ==
An aggressive defender, who describes his defending style as "old-school", Negru lists John Terry as a player he models his game on. He is noted for his heading and tackling abilities, and is described as a physical player. Swindon manager Ian Holloway described him as a "combative centre-back who is also very comfortable on the ball".

== Personal life ==
Regarding his Moldovan heritage, his surname Negru literally means "black" in the Romanian language. This became a center of discussion when, on 24 September 2023, IShowSpeed called Negru via Instagram during a livestream. The two engaged in a comical conversation regarding FIFA cards and his surname, to which Negru clarified the pronunciation of his name and his background. The call concluded with the two playfully barking at each other, IShowSpeed's well-known signature. During the call, however, Negru's number was accidentally leaked to the audience.

== Career statistics ==
As of match played 21 November 2026

Appearances and goals by club, season and competition
| Club | Season | League | | | National cup (Note: Includes FAI Cup & FA Cup) | | League cup (Note: Includes EFL Cup) | | Other | | Total | |
| Club | Season | Division | Apps | Goals | Apps | Goals | Apps | Goals | Apps | Goals | Apps | Goals |
|---|---|---|---|---|---|---|---|---|---|---|---|---|
| Shelbourne | 2022 | LOI Premier Division | 6 | 1 | 3 | 0 | – | | – | | 9 | 1 |
| Oxford United | 2022–23 | League One | 2 | 0 | 0 | 0 | 0 | 0 | 0 | 0 | 2 | 0 |
| Oxford United | 2023–24 | League One | 13 | 0 | 1 | 0 | 1 | 0 | 4 (Note: Appearance(s) in the EFL Trophy.) | 0 | 19 | 0 |
| Oxford United | 2024–25 | Championship | 0 | 0 | 0 | 0 | 0 | 0 | – | | 0 | 0 |
| Oxford United | 2025–26 | Championship | 0 | 0 | 0 | 0 | 0 | 0 | – | | 0 | 0 |
| Oxford United | Total | | 15 | 0 | 1 | 0 | 1 | 0 | 4 | 0 | 21 | 0 |
| Salford City (loan) | 2024–25 | League Two | 30 | 0 | 0 | 0 | 1 | 0 | 1 | 0 | 32 | 0 |
| Bristol Rovers (loan) | 2025–26 | League Two | 5 | 0 | 2 | 0 | 0 | 0 | 3 | 0 | 10 | 0 |
| Tranmere Rovers (loan) | 2025–26 | League Two | 14 | 0 | 0 | 0 | 0 | 0 | 0 | 0 | 14 | 0 |
| Swindon Town | 2026–27 | League Two | 14 | 0 | 1 | 0 | 1 | 0 | 1 | 0 | 17 | 0 |
| Career total | | | 84 | 1 | 7 | 0 | 3 | 0 | 9 | 0 | 103 | 1 |
