= Brian De Keersmaecker =

Belgian footballer (born 2000)

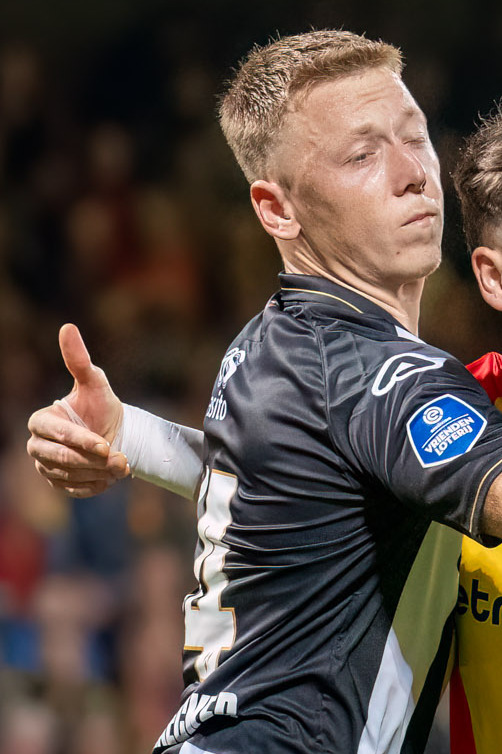
- De Keersmaecker with Heracles Almelo in 2023

Personal information
- Full name: Brian De Keersmaecker
- Date of birth: 6 May 2000 (age 26)
- Place of birth: Bornem, Belgium
- Height: 1.82 m (6 ft 0 in)
- Position: Midfielder

Team information
- Current team: Bristol City (loan from Oxford United)
- Number: 6

Youth career
- Willebroek-Meerhof
- 2008–2013: Beerschot
- 2013–2018: Club Brugge
- 2017–2020: Beerschot

Senior career*
Years	Team	Apps	(Gls)
2019–2021	Beerschot	16	(2)
2020–2021	→ Eindhoven (loan)	26	(3)
2021–2023	Eindhoven	64	(2)
2023–2025	Heracles Almelo	64	(7)
2025–	Oxford United	26	(1)
2026–	→ Bristol City (loan)	1	(0)

International career
2016	Belgium U16	3	(1)
- * Club domestic league appearances and goals as of 23:59, 10 October 2026 (UTC)

Brian De Keersmaecker (born 6 May 2000) is a Belgian professional footballer who plays as a midfielder for EFL Championship club Bristol City, on loan from EFL League One club Oxford United.

== Club career ==
De Keersmaecker made his professional debut with Beerschot in a Europa League Playoff 2–0 win over K.A.S. Eupen on 13 April 2020, scoring in the match. On 2 May 2019, De Keersmaecker signed his first professional contract with Beerschot.

He was sent on a one-season loan to Dutch second-tier Eerste Divisie club FC Eindhoven on 5 October 2020. In May 2021 Beerschot decided not to renew his contract, making him a free agent in July.

On 4 June 2021 he moved to Eindhoven on a permanent basis and signed a two-year contract.

In June 2023, De Keersmaecker signed for Heracles Almelo on a four-year contract.

On 1 July 2025, De Keersmaecker signed for EFL Championship club Oxford United for an undisclosed fee. He made his debut for the club on 23 August 2025, in a 1–0 defeat to Birmingham City. He scored his first goal for the club on 13 December 2025, in a 2–1 defeat to Preston North End.

On 2 September 2026, De Keersmaecker signed for EFL Championship club Bristol City on a loan deal with an option to buy.

== Career statistics ==
As of match played 26 January 2026

Appearances and goals by club, season and competition
Club	Season	League			National cup (Note: Includes Belgian Cup, KNVB Cup, FA Cup)		League cup (Note: Includes EFL Cup)		Other		Total	
Club	Season	Division	Apps	Goals	Apps	Goals	Apps	Goals	Apps	Goals	Apps	Goals
Beerschot	2018-19	Challenger Pro League	6	1	0	0	—		—		6	1
Beerschot	2019-20	Challenger Pro League	10	1	1	0	—		—		11	1
Beerschot	Total		16	2	1	0	—		—		17	2
Eindhoven	2020–21	Eerste Divisie	26	3	1	0	—		0	0	27	3
Eindhoven	2021–22	Eerste Divisie	36	1	1	0	—		4 (Note: Appearances in Eredivisie promotion/relegation play-offs)	0	41	1
Eindhoven	2022–23	Eerste Divisie	28	1	1	0	—		2	0	31	1
Eindhoven	Total		90	5	3	0	—		6	0	99	5
Heracles Almelo	2023–24	Eredivisie	33	2	1	0	—		—		34	2
Heracles Almelo	2024–25	Eredivisie	31	5	5	0	—		—		36	5
Heracles Almelo	Total		64	7	6	0	—		—		70	7
Oxford United	2025–26	Championship	26	1	1	0	1	0	—		28	1
Career total			196	15	11	0	1	0	6	0	214	15
