= Tyler Goodrham =

English footballer (born 2003)

Personal information
- Full name: Tyler Charlie Goodrham
- Date of birth: 7 August 2003 (age 23)
- Place of birth: High Wycombe, Buckinghamshire, England
- Position: Midfielder

Team information
- Current team: Oxford United
- Number: 19

Youth career
- Reading
- –2021: Oxford United

Senior career*
Years	Team	Apps	(Gls)
2019–	Oxford United	136	(15)
2021	→ Hayes & Yeading United (loan)	6	(1)
2021–2022	→ Slough Town (loan)	18	(3)
- * Club domestic league appearances and goals as of 06:58, 5 October 2026 (UTC)

Tyler Charlie Goodrham (born 7 August 2003) is a professional footballer who plays as a midfielder for EFL League One club Oxford United. Born in England, he represents the Republic of Ireland at youth level.

== Club career ==
On 12 November 2019, after graduating from Oxford United's academy, Goodrham made his debut for the club in a 4–1 EFL Trophy win against Crawley Town, becoming Oxford's youngest ever player in the process, aged 16 years and 98 days. In September 2021 he had his first senior loan when he joined Southern Football League Premier Division South side Hayes & Yeading United. He was recalled on 18 November after a successful loan spell with Hayes reaching the first round of the FA Cup and the team challenging at the top of the table.

On 16 December 2021, Goodrham joined National League South side Slough Town on a one-month loan deal.

Goodrham made his League One debut for Oxford as a late substitute against Cambridge United on 6 August 2022 and scored the winning goal in injury time.

== International career ==
On 31 August 2023, Goodrham received his first call up to the Republic of Ireland U21 squad for their 2025 UEFA European Under-21 Championship qualification fixtures against Turkey U21 and San Marino U21 on 8 and 12 September 2023.

== Career statistics ==
As of match played 19 September 2026

Appearances and goals by club, season and competition
Club	Season	League			FA Cup		League Cup		Other		Total	
Club	Season	Division	Apps	Goals	Apps	Goals	Apps	Goals	Apps	Goals	Apps	Goals
Oxford United	2019–20	League One	0	0	0	0	0	0	1 (Note: Appearance(s) in the Football League Trophy)	0	1	0
Oxford United	2020–21	League One	0	0	0	0	0	0	0	0	0	0
Oxford United	2021–22	League One	0	0	0	0	0	0	1	0	1	0
Oxford United	2022–23	League One	36	3	3	1	2	0	3	0	44	4
Oxford United	2023–24	League One	40	8	3	1	1	0	7 (Note: Four appearance(s) in the Football League Trophy and three appearances in the League One playoffs)	1	51	10
Oxford United	2024–25	Championship	41	3	1	0	2	1	0	0	44	4
Oxford United	2025–26	Championship	13	1	0	0	1	1	0	0	14	2
Oxford United	2026–27	League One	6	0	0	0	1	0	0	0	7	0
Oxford United	Total		136	15	7	2	7	2	12	1	163	20
Hayes & Yeading United (loan)	2021–22	SFL – Premier Division South	6	1	5	1	—		4 (Note: Two appearances in the FA Trophy, one appearance in the Southern League Cup and one appearance in the Middlesex Senior Cup)	1	15	3
Slough Town (loan)	2021–22	National League South	17	3	0	0	—		0	0	17	3
Career total			159	19	12	3	7	2	16	2	185	26

== Honours ==
Oxford United

- EFL League One play-offs: 2024
