= Stanley Mills (footballer) =

English association football player

- Mills with Preston North End in 2026

Personal information
- Full name: Stanley Mills
- Date of birth: 25 October 2003 (age 23)
- Place of birth: Norwich, England
- Height: 1.80 m (5 ft 11 in)
- Position: Winger

Team information
- Current team: Preston North End
- Number: 17

Youth career
- –2018: Leeds United
- 2018–2022: Everton

Senior career*
| Years | Team | Apps | (Gls) |
| 2022–2025 | Everton | 0 | (0) |
| 2023–2024 | → Oxford United (loan) | 21 | (1) |
| 2025–2026 | Oxford United | 55 | (4) |
| 2026– | Preston North End | 11 | (0) |
- * Club domestic league appearances and goals as of 15:09, 13 November 2026 (UTC)

Stanley Mills (born 25 October 2003) is an English professional footballer who plays as a winger for EFL Championship club Preston North End.

== Career ==
Mills joined Everton from Leeds United in 2018. In July 2021, he signed his first professional contract, signing a two-year deal. In July 2022, he made the first team squad for a pre-season tour of the USA. The following month, after making his first team debut on tour, he extended his contract until 2025. On 23 August 2022, he made his professional debut as a substitute in a 1–0 win over Fleetwood Town in the EFL Cup.

On 27 July 2023, Mills joined League One club Oxford United on a season-long loan deal. The loan deal was cut short in January 2024 after he suffered a serious knee injury and returned to Everton for treatment.

=== Oxford United ===
On 31 January 2025, Mills returned to Oxford on a permanent deal.

Although the season ended in disappointment as Oxford United were relegated from the Championship, Mills was named Player of the Season for the 2025–26 season.

On 14 August 2026, it was announced that Mills would be joining Preston North End in January 2027. However, two weeks later, Mills completed his move early for an undisclosed fee, signing a three-year deal to immediately join his new side.

== Personal life ==
Mills is the son of former England international Danny Mills. His brother is British runner George Mills.

== Career statistics ==
=== Club ===
As of match played 7 November 2026

Appearances and goals by club, season and competition
| Club | Season | League | | | FA Cup | | League Cup | | Other | | Total | |
| Club | Season | Division | Apps | Goals | Apps | Goals | Apps | Goals | Apps | Goals | Apps | Goals |
|---|---|---|---|---|---|---|---|---|---|---|---|---|
| Everton | 2022–23 | Premier League | 0 | 0 | 0 | 0 | 2 | 0 | — | | 2 | 0 |
| Oxford United (loan) | 2023–24 | EFL League One | 21 | 1 | 3 | 0 | 1 | 0 | 2 (Note: Appearances in Football League Trophy) | 0 | 27 | 1 |
| Oxford United | 2024–25 | EFL Championship | 11 | 1 | 0 | 0 | 0 | 0 | — | | 11 | 1 |
| Oxford United | 2025–26 | EFL Championship | 43 | 3 | 2 | 0 | 1 | 0 | — | | 46 | 3 |
| Oxford United | Total | | 54 | 4 | 2 | 0 | 1 | 0 | — | | 57 | 4 |
| Preston North End | 2026–27 | EFL Championship | 11 | 0 | 0 | 0 | 0 | 0 | — | | 11 | 0 |
| Career total | | | 86 | 5 | 5 | 0 | 4 | 0 | 2 | 0 | 97 | 5 |

== Honours ==
Individual

- Oxford United Player of the Season: 2025–26
