= Nik Prelec =

Slovenian footballer (born 2001)

Personal information
- Date of birth: 10 June 2001 (age 25)
- Place of birth: Maribor, Slovenia
- Height: 1.86 m (6 ft 1 in)
- Position: Forward

Team information
- Current team: Jagiellonia Białystok
- Number: 99

Youth career
- –2013: Kovinar Tezno
- 2014–2017: Aluminij
- 2017–2021: Sampdoria

Senior career*
Years	Team	Apps	(Gls)
2020–2022	Sampdoria	0	(0)
2022	→ Olimpija Ljubljana (loan)	11	(1)
2022–2023	WSG Tirol	13	(6)
2023–2026	Cagliari	12	(0)
2023–2024	→ WSG Tirol (loan)	32	(8)
2024–2025	→ Austria Wien (loan)	31	(6)
2025–2026	→ Oxford United (loan)	18	(1)
2026	Oxford United	6	(0)
2026–	Jagiellonia Białystok	13	(5)

International career
2016	Slovenia U15	7	(5)
2017	Slovenia U16	5	(3)
2016–2018	Slovenia U17	23	(8)
2018	Slovenia U18	2	(0)
2018–2020	Slovenia U19	20	(10)
2020–2022	Slovenia U21	10	(2)
- * Club domestic league appearances and goals as of 22 November 2026

Nik Prelec (born 10 June 2001) is a Slovenian professional footballer who plays as a forward for Ekstraklasa club Jagiellonia Białystok.

== Career ==
Prelec started his senior career with Serie A side Sampdoria. Before the second half of the 2021–22 season, he was sent on loan to Olimpija Ljubljana in Slovenia. In July 2022, Prelec signed for Austrian club WSG Tirol.

On 31 January 2023, Prelec signed a three-and-a-half-year contract with Cagliari in Italy. On 1 July 2023, he returned to WSG Tirol on a season-long loan. On 12 July 2024, he signed a new contract with Cagliari until 2027 and was subsequently loaned out to Austrian side Austria Wien.

On 1 August 2025, Prelec joined EFL Championship club Oxford United on loan for the 2025–26 season with an option to buy. In February 2026, Oxford triggered the option and signed him on a permanent contract.

== Career statistics ==
As of match played 20 September 2026

Appearances and goals by club, season and competition
Club	Season	League			National cup (Note: Includes Austrian Cup)		League cup (Note: Includes EFL Cup)		Europe		Other		Total	
Club	Season	Division	Apps	Goals	Apps	Goals	Apps	Goals	Apps	Goals	Apps	Goals	Apps	Goals
Sampdoria	2021–22	Serie A	0	0	0	0	—		—		—		0	0
Olimpija Ljubljana (loan)	2021–22	Slovenian PrvaLiga	11	1	0	0	—		—		—		11	1
WSG Tirol	2022–23	Austrian Bundesliga	13	6	2	0	—		—		—		15	6
Cagliari	2022–23	Serie B	12	0	0	0	—		—		4 (Note: Appearances in Serie B play-offs)	0	16	0
WSG Tirol (loan)	2023–24	Austrian Bundesliga	32	8	2	1	—		—		—		34	9
Austria Wien (loan)	2024–25	Austrian Bundesliga	31	6	5	2	—		2 (Note: Appearances in UEFA Conference League)	1	—		38	9
Oxford United (loan)	2025–26	EFL Championship	18	1	0	0	1	0	—		—		19	1
Oxford United	2025–26	EFL Championship	6	0	—		—		—		—		6	0
Oxford United	Total		24	1	0	0	1	0	—		—		25	1
Jagiellonia Białystok	2026–27	Ekstraklasa	8	3	0	0	—		5 (Note: Appearances in UEFA Europa League)	1	—		13	4
Career total			131	25	9	3	1	0	7	2	4	0	152	30
