= Mark Harris (Welsh footballer) =

Welsh footballer (born 1998)

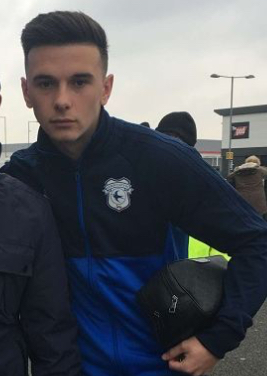
- Harris at Cardiff City in 2018

Personal information
- Full name: Thomas Mark Harris
- Date of birth: 29 December 1998 (age 27)
- Place of birth: Swansea, Wales
- Height: 6 ft 0 in (1.82 m)
- Positions: Striker; winger

Team information
- Current team: Oxford United
- Number: 9

Youth career
- 2006–2017: Cardiff City

Senior career*
Years	Team	Apps	(Gls)
2017–2023	Cardiff City	87	(9)
2018–2019	→ Newport County (loan)	16	(2)
2019	→ Port Vale (loan)	6	(0)
2019–2020	→ Wrexham (loan)	24	(3)
2023–	Oxford United	140	(31)

International career^{‡}
2014–2015	Wales U17	5	(2)
2016–2017	Wales U19	6	(2)
2017	Wales U20	3	(0)
2017–2020	Wales U21	20	(3)
2021–	Wales	20	(0)
- * Club domestic league appearances and goals as of 23:50, 21 November 2026 (UTC) ‡ National team caps and goals as of 19:19, 14 November 2026 (UTC)

Thomas Mark Harris (born 29 December 1998) is a Welsh professional footballer who plays for EFL League One club Oxford United and the Wales national team. A versatile forward, he can play as a winger or striker.

Harris represented Wales at under-17, under-19, under-20 and under-21 level. He turned professional at Cardiff City in December 2016 and spent the 2018–19 season on loan at Newport County and Port Vale. He spent the first half of the 2019–20 season on loan at Wrexham before breaking into the Cardiff first team during the 2020–21 campaign, though he was released in June 2023. He joined Oxford United the following month and was promoted from League One via the play-offs in 2024.

== Club career ==
=== Cardiff City ===
Harris began his career at Cardiff City and was offered his first professional contract at the club in December 2016. He made his first-team debut on 8 January 2017, coming on as a substitute for Greg Halford in a 2–1 defeat to Fulham in the FA Cup. A series of illnesses and injuries throughout the Cardiff squad gave Harris the chance to make his Championship debut on 22 April, playing in a five-man midfield in a 0–0 draw at Wigan Athletic. Speaking after the match, manager Neil Warnock said that "I thought he did okay but I felt sorry for him because we were so poor in that area". He made one further appearance in the 2016–17 season, though did not feature in the "Bluebirds" 2017–18 promotion campaign.

On 2 August 2018, Harris joined League Two side Newport County on an initial six-month loan deal. He made his debut for the "Exiles" on 11 August, in a 1–0 victory over Crewe Alexandra at Rodney Parade. He scored his first goal for the club seven days later, in a 1–1 draw at Exeter City. After initially establishing himself in the first team, Harris suffered a concussion while on international duty and was unable to regain his place on his return because of the form of fellow forwards Jamille Matt and Pádraig Amond. He made a total of 20 appearances in all competitions during his loan spell, scoring three times, before returning to the Cardiff City Stadium in January 2019 despite Newport manager Mike Flynn's statement that he was confident of extending the loan deal.

On 23 January 2019, he signed for struggling League Two side Port Vale on loan for the remainder of the 2018–19 season. He made three starts and three substitute appearances for the "Valiants" before being allowed to return to Cardiff early by manager John Askey after going five weeks without a first-team game.

On 24 June 2019, Harris signed for National League club Wrexham on a season-long loan. "Red Dragons" manager Bryan Hughes commented that "he'll fit in well to our system. He can play across front three and he is an exciting talent". Harris scored his first goal in his second game for Wrexham, in their 2–2 draw at Boreham Wood on 6 August. He then followed that up with goals in the next two games, in a 2–1 loss at Dover Athletic and then getting the only goal of the game against FC Halifax Town at the Racecourse Ground. However, he lost his first-team place under new manager Dean Keates and his loan was terminated early on 7 January.

Harris came off the bench to make his first appearance of the 2020–21 Cardiff City season in a 3–2 defeat away at Queens Park Rangers on 31 October. On 28 November, Harris started his first game of the season and scored his side's second goal in a 4–0 victory over Luton Town, his first senior goal for the club. With Neil Harris favouring his namesake over £5.5 million signing Robert Glatzel, his inclusion in the starting eleven was seen as a gamble by Harris. His partnership with Kieffer Moore was effective, however, until Moore was side lined with injury after six games. Harris then faced stiff competition in the second half of the campaign after new manager Mick McCarthy signed Max Watters and used wingers Josh Murphy and Sheyi Ojo as strikers. He went on to score impressive goals in comfortable wins over Preston North End and Birmingham City to end the season with three goals in 17 appearances.

He made 17 starts and 17 substitute appearances in the 2021–22 Championship campaign as Cardiff looked to integrate more Welsh players into the first team. Speaking in February, manager Steve Morison said that he was giving Harris a run in the starting eleven because of his impressive work in training and was rewarded as he scored his fourth goal of the campaign. He was linked with a move to Millwall in August 2023. However, Morison denied having received any offers for Harris. He featured 38 times in the 2022–23 season, scoring three goals. Harris was offered a new contract by new manager Sabri Lamouchi in May 2023 but contract talks stalled and he left the club after the expiration of his contract.

=== Oxford United ===
On 11 July 2023, Harris joined EFL League One club Oxford United on a "long term deal". Manager Liam Manning said that "signing a full international with his best years ahead of him is a big thing for us". He was sent off for the first time in his career on 2 September after elbowing Nathan Smith in an off-the-ball incident during a 2–1 defeat to former club Port Vale. Following a strong end to the season, scoring six goals in as many matches as Oxford secured their place in the play-offs, Harris was awarded the EFL League One Player of the Month for April 2024. He scored 15 goals in 43 league games in total and went on to say that he had made the right move in joining the club. He hoped his good form would earn him a recall to the Wales squad. He played at Wembley Stadium in the play-off final victory over Bolton Wanderers.

Harris continued his form into the 2024–25 season, scoring four goals in his first four matches, being named EFL Championship Player of the Month for August. He was later also nominated for the EFL Goal of the Season for his strike against Blackburn Rovers. Speaking in February, Harris said that new manager Gary Rowett had made the team harder to beat. His six goals in the campaign won him the club's Golden Boot award, and he signed a new contract of undisclosed length.

He scored three goals in the 2025 edition of the Piala Presiden to claim the top-scorer award, with Oxford finishing runners-up to Thai club Port in the pre-season tournament. He scored three goals in 40 games across the 2025–26 season, which culminated in relegation.

== International career ==
Harris represented Wales at under-17 level, scoring the winning goal against Montenegro in Minsk to secure Wales a place in the Elite Round of qualification for the 2015 UEFA European Under-17 Championship. He went on to be called up to the under-19 team and on 12 November 2016 he scored Wales' second goal of a 3–2 victory over England, only to score an own goal two minutes later; despite the victory Wales failed to qualify for the 2017 UEFA European Under-19 Championship. In May 2017, Rob Page named Harris in the Wales under-20 squad for the 2017 Toulon Tournament. After making his debut for the side in the tournament opener against Ivory Coast as a substitute in place of Tyler Roberts, Harris was named in the starting line-up in Wales' remaining two group matches against France and Bahrain as Wales were eliminated in the group stage. He made a total of two appearances for the under-17s, five appearances for the under-19s and three appearances for the under-20s. Harris made his debut for the under-21 side on 1 September 2017, coming on as a substitute in place of Tyler Roberts in a 3–0 victory over Switzerland.

On 30 August 2021, Harris received his first call up to the senior squad as manager Rob Page sought replacements for the injured Aaron Ramsey, Joe Rodon, George Thomas and Neco Williams. He made his debut on 5 September, replacing clubmate Rubin Colwill in the 57th-minute of a 3–2 victory against Belarus in a 2022 FIFA World Cup qualification game. In November 2022, he was named in the Wales squad for the 2022 FIFA World Cup in Qatar.

== Style of play ==
Harris is a versatile forward, able to play as a striker, winger, or behind the striker. Harris has said "I don't mind playing up front in a two, my main strength I would say is running in behind and getting at defenders". Newport County manager Mike Flynn stated that "he's a good finisher, makes intelligent runs, and is very quick".

== Career statistics ==
=== Club ===
As of match played 2 May 2026

Appearances and goals by club, season and competition
Club	Season	League			FA Cup		EFL Cup		Other		Total	
Club	Season	Division	Apps	Goals	Apps	Goals	Apps	Goals	Apps	Goals	Apps	Goals
Cardiff City	2016–17	Championship	2	0	1	0	0	0	—		3	0
Cardiff City	2017–18	Championship	0	0	0	0	0	0	—		0	0
Cardiff City	2018–19	Premier League	0	0	0	0	0	0	—		0	0
Cardiff City	2019–20	Championship	0	0	0	0	0	0	—		0	0
Cardiff City	2020–21	Championship	16	3	1	0	0	0	—		17	3
Cardiff City	2021–22	Championship	34	3	2	1	1	0	—		37	4
Cardiff City	2022–23	Championship	35	3	2	0	1	0	—		38	3
Cardiff City	Total		87	9	6	1	2	0	0	0	95	10
Newport County (loan)	2018–19	League Two	16	2	1	0	0	0	3 (Note: Appearances in EFL Trophy)	1	20	3
Port Vale (loan)	2018–19	League Two	6	0	—		—		—		6	0
Wrexham (loan)	2019–20	National League	24	3	3	0	—		1 (Note: Appearances in FA Trophy)	0	28	3
Oxford United	2023–24	League One	43	15	3	1	1	0	8 (Note: 5 appearances and 3 goals in EFL Trophy and 3 appearances in EFL League One play-offs)	3	55	19
Oxford United	2024–25	Championship	46	6	0	0	1	0	—		47	6
Oxford United	2025–26	Championship	37	3	1	0	2	0	—		40	3
Oxford United	2026–27	League One	0	0	0	0	0	0	0	0	0	0
Oxford United	Total		126	24	4	1	4	0	8	3	142	28
Career total			259	38	14	2	6	0	12	4	291	44

=== International ===
As of match played 14 November 2026

Appearances and goals by national team and year
National team	Year	Apps	Goals
Wales	2021	3	0
Wales	2022	2	0
Wales	2023	0	0
Wales	2024	4	0
Wales	2025	7	0
Wales	2026	4	0
Total		20	0

== Honours ==
Oxford United

- EFL League One play-offs: 2024

Individual

- EFL Championship Player of the Month: August 2024
- EFL League One Player of the Month: April 2024
- Piala Presiden Top scorer: 2025
