= Greg Leigh =

Jamaica international footballer (born 1994)

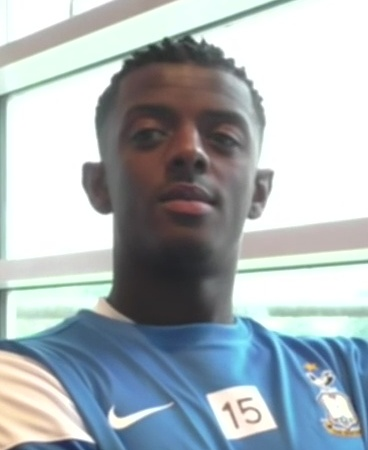
- Leigh with Bradford City in 2015

Personal information
- Full name: Gregory Alex Leigh
- Date of birth: 30 September 1994 (age 32)
- Place of birth: Sale, England
- Height: 1.80 m (5 ft 11 in)
- Position: Left-back

Team information
- Current team: Oxford United
- Number: 22

Youth career
- Sale United
- 2004–2014: Manchester City

Senior career*
Years	Team	Apps	(Gls)
2014–2015	Manchester City	0	(0)
2014–2015	→ Crewe Alexandra (loan)	38	(1)
2015–2016	Bradford City	6	(1)
2016–2018	Bury	86	(2)
2018–2020	NAC Breda	16	(1)
2019–2020	→ Aberdeen (loan)	18	(1)
2020–2021	Aberdeen	8	(0)
2021–2022	Morecambe	36	(2)
2022–2023	Ipswich Town	15	(0)
2023–	Oxford United	81	(13)

International career^{‡}
2013	England U19	4	(0)
2020–	Jamaica	31	(1)
Medal record
Men's football
Representing Jamaica
CONCACAF Nations League
Bronze medal – third place	2024 United States	Team
- * Club domestic league appearances and goals as of 23:38, 16 November 2026 (UTC) ‡ National team caps and goals as of 23:16, 18 November 2025 (UTC)

Gregory Alex Leigh (born 30 September 1994) is a professional footballer who plays as a left-back for EFL League One club Oxford United. Born in England, he represents the Jamaica national team.

Having come through the Manchester City Academy, Leigh has previously played for Crewe Alexandra, Bradford City, Bury, Aberdeen, Dutch club NAC Breda, Morecambe and Ipswich Town.

== Club career ==
=== Manchester City ===
Born in Sale, Greater Manchester, Leigh joined Manchester City Academy in 2004 at age nine, after he was spotted by scouts whilst playing for Sale United. Initially, he joined the club as a striker before converting into a left–back position and progressed through the youth ranks for the side. He was nominated for the 2012–13 Academy player of the season award.

Leigh was included in Manchester City's squad for the 2014–15 pre-season friendly tour and appeared in several friendly matches. On 12 August 2014, it was announced that Leigh would join League One club Crewe Alexandra on loan, initially until January 2015, later extended to the end of the 2014–2015 season. Leigh made his professional debut in the League Cup against Barnsley on 12 August 2014; he started the match but was substituted by Jon Guthrie in the 62nd minute. He scored his first league goal, opening the scoring in a 2–0 win over Scunthorpe on 7 March 2015. This goal was voted the goal of the season for Crewe Alexandra by fans.

After his loan spell at Crewe Alexandra ended, having made forty-two appearances in all competitions, Leigh was released by Manchester City. Crewe manager Steve Davis was keen to sign him on a permanent basis, but Leigh turned down the offer of a deal.

=== Bradford City ===
After Crewe Alexandra's attempts to sign him failed, Leigh went on trial at Bradford City. Following a successful trial, he signed a one-year deal on 6 August 2015.

Leigh struggled to secure a first-team place and spent most of the season as an unused substitute. He got his first-team breakthrough when his fellow team-mate James Meredith was absent because of international commitments, and made his Bradford City debut on 13 October 2015, in the second round of the Football League Trophy, in a 2–1 loss against Barnsley. After continuously spending time on the substitutes' bench, Leigh made his league debut for the club on 14 November 2015 against his former club, Crewe Alexandra, following Meredith's absence and Bradford City won 2–0. He then scored his first Bradford City goal five days later in an FA Cup first round replay, in a 2–0 win over Aldershot Town. Three days later on 21 November 2015, Leigh scored his first league goal for the club, in a 2–0 win over Scunthorpe United. Following Merderith's return to the first team, Leigh lost his first-team place once again and only made a total of six league appearances for the club.

=== Bury ===
Despite being offered a new contract by Bradford City, Leigh opted to move to Bury on 1 July 2016, signing a two-year contract and joining his team-mate Ben Williams. Upon joining the club, Leigh was given the number 3 shirt ahead of the new season.

Leigh made his Bury debut in the opening game of the season, playing in the left-back position for 90 minutes, in a 2–0 win over Charlton Athletic. He quickly established himself in the left–back position in the starting eleven. He played in a 5–3–2 formation under the management of Lee Clark. He started in every match until he was sent off for a second bookable offence, in a 1–0 defeat against Sheffield United on 22 November 2016. After serving a one-match suspension, he returned to the first team, regaining his place for a 4–2 loss against Bristol Rovers on 10 December 2016. In a match against Oxford United on 17 December 2016, he scored an own goal, in a 3–2 loss. It wasn't until 14 March 2017 that Leigh scored his first goal for the club, as well as setting up two goals including a penalty, in a 3–0 win over Bristol Rovers. At the end of the 2016–17 season, having made 51 appearances and scoring once in all competitions, Leigh was named the disabled supporters' player of the year after a strong season at Bury.

At the start of the 2017–18 season, Leigh continued to establish himself in the starting eleven, regaining his place in the left-back position. Despite the club's poor results, which resulted in Clark's sacking, Leigh remained a standout for the side throughout the season. He then scored his first goal of the season, in a 3–1 win over Stoke City U23 on 8 November 2017. Then, on 21 November 2017, Leigh scored again, in a 1–0 win over Shrewsbury Town. Despite suffering from an injury he returned to the first team, as Bury were relegated from League One after finishing in 24th place at the end of the season.

Leigh was offered a new contract by Bury at the end of the 2017–18 season.

=== NAC Breda ===
Leigh moved abroad for the first time in his career when he opted to join Eredivisie side NAC Breda on a three-year deal in June 2018.

=== Aberdeen ===
Leigh was loaned to Scottish Premiership club Aberdeen in June 2019. After he negotiated his release from NAC Breda, Leigh signed a short-term contract with Aberdeen in October 2020. He extended the contract in January to stay until the end of the season, but suffered a hamstring injury in February 2021 that ruled him out for the remainder of the season. He was released by Aberdeen at the end of the season.

=== Morecambe ===
In July 2021, Leigh signed for League One side Morecambe on a one-year deal. At the end of the season Leigh was released by the club.

=== Ipswich Town ===
On 20 June 2022, Leigh signed a two-year contract with Ipswich Town and in the 2–2 draw on with Sheffield Wednesday on 17 September 2022 he broke his leg.

=== Oxford United ===
On 24 August 2023, Leigh joined League One side Oxford United for an undisclosed fee. He made his debut on 26 August as a 78th-minute substitute in a 2–1 home victory over Charlton Athletic. Across September, he scored three goals for his new club, being awarded with the EFL League One Player of the Month award for his efforts.

== International career ==
Leigh is eligible to represent England or Jamaica internationally.

On 17 January 2013, Leigh was called up by England U19 for the first time. Weeks later on 5 February 2013, Leigh made his England U19 debut, playing 90 minutes, in a 3–1 win over Denmark U19.

Leigh debuted with the Jamaica national team in a 3–0 friendly loss to Saudi Arabia on 14 November 2020.

== Career statistics ==
=== Club ===
As of match played 8 November 2025

Appearances and goals by club, season and competition
Club	Season	League			National cup (Note: Includes FA Cup, Scottish Cup.)		League cup (Note: Includes English League Cup, Scottish League Cup.)		Other		Total	
Club	Season	Division	Apps	Goals	Apps	Goals	Apps	Goals	Apps	Goals	Apps	Goals
Manchester City	2014–15	Premier League	0	0	0	0	0	0	0	0	0	0
Crewe Alexandra (loan)	2014–15	League One	38	1	2	0	2	0	0	0	42	1
Bradford City	2015–16	League One	6	1	2	1	0	0	1 (Note: Appearance in Football League Trophy)	0	9	2
Bury	2016–17	League One	45	1	2	0	1	0	3 (Note: Appearances in EFL Trophy)	0	51	1
Bury	2017–18	League One	41	1	2	0	1	0	5	1	49	2
Bury	Total		86	2	4	0	2	0	8	1	100	3
NAC Breda	2018–19	Eredivisie	16	1	0	0	0	0	0	0	16	1
NAC Breda	2019–20	Eerste Divisie	0	0	0	0	0	0	0	0	0	0
NAC Breda	Total		16	1	0	0	0	0	0	0	16	1
Aberdeen (loan)	2019–20	Scottish Premiership	18	1	1	0	2	0	3 (Note: Appearances in UEFA Europa League)	1	24	2
Aberdeen	2020–21	Scottish Premiership	8	0	0	0	1	0	0	0	9	0
Morecambe	2021–22	League One	36	2	3	0	2	0	0	0	41	2
Ipswich Town	2022–23	League One	14	0	3	0	1	0	2	1	20	1
Ipswich Town	2023–24	Championship	1	0	0	0	1	0	—		2	0
Ipswich Town	Total		15	0	3	0	2	0	2	1	22	1
Oxford United	2023–24	League One	33	6	1	0	0	0	3 (Note: One appearance in EFL Trophy, two appearances in EFL League One play-offs)	0	37	6
Oxford United	2024–25	Championship	34	6	1	0	2	0	—		37	6
Oxford United	2025–26	Championship	11	1	0	0	0	0	—		11	1
Oxford United	Total		78	13	2	0	2	0	3	0	85	13
Career total			296	20	17	1	13	0	17	3	348	25

=== International ===
As of match played 18 November 2025

Appearances and goals by national team and year
National team	Year	Apps	Goals
Jamaica	2020	2	0
Jamaica	2021	1	0
Jamaica	2022	5	0
Jamaica	2023	4	0
Jamaica	2024	11	1
Jamaica	2025	8	0
Total		31	1

International goals

As of match played 23 March 2024
Jamaica score listed first, score column indicates score after each Leigh goal.

International goals by date, venue, cap, opponent, score, result and competition
No.	Date	Venue	Cap	Opponent	Score	Result	Competition	Ref
1	21 March 2024	AT&T Stadium, Arlington, Texas	13	United States	1–0	1–3	2023–24 CONCACAF Nations League A	

== Honours ==
Ipswich Town

- EFL League One second-place promotion: 2022–23

Oxford United

- EFL League One play-offs: 2024

Jamaica

- CONCACAF Nations League third place: 2024

Individual

- EFL League One Player of the Month: September 2023
