= Negru =

The Romanian-language surname Negru literally means "black" and may refer to:

- Dan Negru, Romanian TV presenter and host
- Natalia Negru, Romanian poet and writer
- Nicolae Negru, Moldovan writer and journalist
- Stephan Negru, Irish football player of Moldovan descent
- Tudor Negru, Moldovan politician
- Valentin Negru, Romanian football player

== Others ==
- Radu Negru, Radu the Black, a mythical early ruler of Wallachia
- Râul Negru, river in Romania
