= 2023–24 Oxford United F.C. season =

English football club season

Oxford United
2023–24 season
- Owner: Erick Thohir and Anindya Bakrie
- Chairman: Grant Ferguson
- Head Coach: Liam Manning (until 7 November); Craig Short (caretaker 7 November – 16 November); Des Buckingham (from 16 November)
- Stadium: Kassam Stadium
- League One: 5th
- Play-offs: Winners
- FA Cup: Third round
- EFL Cup: First round
- EFL Trophy: Round of 16
- Top goalscorer: League: Mark Harris (15); All: Mark Harris (19)
- Highest home attendance: 11,219 (v Derby County, 29 December 2023, EFL League One)
- Lowest home attendance: 1,298 (v Chelsea U21, 7 November 2023, EFL Trophy)
- Average home league attendance: 9,021
- Biggest win: 5–0 v Chelsea U21 (Home, 7 November 2023, EFL Trophy); 5–0 v Peterborough United (Home, 13 April 2024, EFL League One)
- Biggest defeat: 5–0 v Bolton Wanderers (Home, 12 March 2024, EFL League One)
Home colours	Away colours	Third colours

The 2023–24 season is the 130th season in the history of Oxford United and their eighth consecutive season in League One. The club participated in League One, the FA Cup, the EFL Cup, and the 2023–24 EFL Trophy.

Oxford finished 5th in the league table, but were promoted back to the EFL Championship via the play-offs, beating Bolton Wanderers 2–0 in the play-off final to return to the second tier of English football for the first time in 25 years.

It was the club's 130th year in existence, their 124th of competitive football and their 75th since turning professional. This article covers the period from 1 July 2023 to 30 June 2024.

== Current squad ==
As of 27 March 2024

No.	Name	Position	Nationality	Place of birth	Date of birth (age)	Previous club	Date signed	Fee	Contract end
Goalkeepers
1	Jamie Cumming	GK	(England)	Winchester	4 September 1999 (age 27)	Chelsea	11 January 2024	Loan	30 June 2024
13	Simon Eastwood	GK	(England)	Luton	26 June 1989 (age 37)	Blackburn Rovers	1 July 2016	Free	30 June 2026
31	Eddie Brearey	GK	(England)		9 June 2004 (age 22)	Academy	1 July 2022	Trainee	30 June 2024
41	Monty Marriott	GK	(England)			Academy	6 November 2023	Trainee	30 June 2024
Defenders
2	Sam Long	RB	(England)	Bicester	16 January 1995 (age 31)	Academy	1 July 2013	Trainee	30 June 2026
3	Ciaron Brown	LB	(Northern Ireland)	(England) Hillingdon	14 January 1998 (age 28)	(Wales) Cardiff City	1 July 2022	Free	30 June 2025
4	Jordan Thorniley	CB	(England)	Warrington	24 November 1996 (age 29)	Blackpool	1 July 2023	Free	30 June 2026
5	Elliott Moore	CB	(England)	Coalville	16 March 1997 (age 29)	Leicester City	1 August 2019	Undisclosed	30 June 2026
12	Joe Bennett	LB	(England)	Rochdale	28 March 1990 (age 36)	Wigan Athletic	30 November 2023	Free	30 June 2024 (Note: Bennett joined in December on a short-term deal but on 10 January extended his contract to run until the end of the season.)
15	Fin Stevens	RB	(Wales)	(England) Brighton	10 April 2003 (age 23)	Brentford	1 July 2023	Loan	31 May 2024
22	Greg Leigh	LB	(Jamaica)	(England) Sale	30 September 1994 (age 32)	Ipswich Town	24 August 2023	Undisclosed	30 June 2025
26	James Golding	RB	(Republic of Ireland)	(England) Sutton	10 August 2004 (age 22)	Academy	23 March 2022	Trainee	30 June 2027
28	Stephan Negru	CB	(Republic of Ireland)	(Moldova) Florești	24 July 2002 (age 24)	(Republic of Ireland) Shelbourne	1 January 2023	Undisclosed	30 June 2026
Midfielders
6	Josh McEachran	CM	(England)	Oxford	1 March 1993 (age 33)	Milton Keynes Dons	1 July 2023	Free	30 June 2025
8	Cameron Brannagan	CM	(England)	Manchester	6 May 1996 (age 30)	Liverpool	11 January 2018	Undisclosed	30 June 2025
14	Oisin Smyth	AM	(Northern Ireland)	Derrytrasna	5 May 2000 (age 26)	(Northern Ireland) Dungannon Swifts	31 January 2022	Undisclosed	30 June 2025
17	James Henry	RM	(England)	Reading	10 June 1989 (age 37)	Wolverhampton Wanderers	12 July 2017	Free	30 June 2024
18	Marcus McGuane	DM	(England)	Greenwich	2 February 1999 (age 27)	Nottingham Forest	1 July 2021	Undisclosed	30 June 2024
19	Tyler Goodrham	MF	(England)	High Wycombe	7 August 2003 (age 23)	Academy	1 July 2022	Trainee	30 June 2027
34	George Franklin	DM	(England)		9 September 2004 (age 22)	Academy	1 July 2023	Trainee	30 June 2024
44	Zaide Took-Oxley	CM	(England)			Academy	9 August 2023	Trainee	30 June 2024
Forwards
9	Mark Harris	CF	(Wales)	Swansea	29 December 1998 (age 27)	(Wales) Cardiff City	11 July 2023	Free	30 June 2026
10	Billy Bodin	CF	(Wales)	(England) Swindon	24 March 1992 (age 34)	Preston North End	30 June 2021	Free	30 June 2024
11	Marcus Browne	CF	(England)	Tower Hamlets	18 December 1997 (age 28)	Middlesbrough	31 January 2022	Undisclosed	30 June 2024
16	Tyler Burey	FW	(England)	Hillingdon	9 January 2001 (age 25)	(Denmark) Odense Boldklub	10 January 2024	Loan	30 June 2024
20	Rúben Rodrigues	CF	(Portugal)	Oliveira de Azeméis	2 August 1996 (age 30)	Notts County	1 July 2023	Free	30 June 2026
23	Josh Murphy	LW	(England)	Wembley	24 February 1995 (age 31)	(Wales) Cardiff City	26 July 2022	Free	30 June 2024
25	Will Goodwin	CF	(England)	Tarporley	7 May 2002 (age 24)	Cheltenham Town	19 January 2024	Undisclosed	30 June 2026
27	Max Woltman	CF	(England)	Wirral	20 August 2003 (age 23)	Liverpool	3 August 2023	Undisclosed	30 June 2026
30	Owen Dale	RW	(England)	Warrington	1 November 1998 (age 28)	Blackpool	1 February 2024	Undisclosed	30 June 2025
39	Gatlin O'Donkor	CF	(England)	Oxford	14 October 2004 (age 22)	Academy	1 July 2022	Trainee	30 June 2026
47	Aidan Elliott-Wheeler	CF	(England)	Oxford	31 August 2007 (age 19)	Academy	1 July 2023	Trainee	30 June 2024
48	Leo Snowden	CF	(England)			Academy	6 November 2023	Trainee	30 June 2024
50	Louis Griffiths	LW	(Wales)		3 September 2007 (age 19)	Academy	5 September 2023	Trainee	30 June 2024
59	Kasway Burton	CF	(England)			Academy	5 September 2023	Trainee	30 June 2024
—	Kyle Edwards	LW	(England)	Dudley	17 February 1998 (age 28)	Ipswich Town	16 January 2024	Free	30 June 2024
Out on Loan
4	Stuart Findlay	CB	(Scotland)	Carmyle	14 September 1995 (age 31)	(United States) Philadelphia Union	19 July 2022	Undisclosed	30 June 2026
42	Steve Seddon	LB	(England)	Reading	25 December 1997 (age 28)	Birmingham City	22 July 2021	Undisclosed	30 June 2024
43	Richard McIntyre	LB	(England)		16 July 2006 (age 20)	Academy	9 January 2024	Trainee	30 June 2024

== Transfers ==
=== In ===
Date	Pos	Player	Transferred from	Fee	Ref.
1 July 2023	CM	Josh McEachran (ENG)	Milton Keynes Dons (ENG)	Free transfer	
1 July 2023	CF	Rúben Rodrigues (POR)	Notts County (ENG)	Free transfer	
1 July 2023	CB	Jordan Thorniley (ENG)	Blackpool (ENG)	Free transfer	
11 July 2023	CF	Mark Harris (WAL)	Cardiff City (WAL)	Free transfer	
3 August 2023	CF	Max Woltman (ENG)	Liverpool (ENG)	Undisclosed	
24 August 2023	LB	Greg Leigh (JAM)	Ipswich Town (ENG)	Undisclosed	
10 October 2023	CF	Cammy Cooper (SCO)	Free agent	—N/a	
20 October 2023	DM	Alex Rodríguez (SPA)	Free agent (Note: Gorrín's contract with Oxford United expired in summer 2023 but he remained at the club as a free agent while he recovered from an injury before eventually re-signing)	—N/a	
30 November 2023	LB	Joe Bennett (ENG)	Free agent	—N/a	
16 January 2024	LW	Kyle Edwards (ENG)	Free agent	—N/a	
19 January 2024	CF	Will Goodwin (ENG)	Cheltenham Town (ENG)	Undisclosed	
1 February 2024	RW	Owen Dale (ENG)	Blackpool (ENG)	Undisclosed	
24 June 2024	RB	Peter Kioso (IRL)	Rotherham United (ENG)	Undisclosed	
27 June 2024	GK	Jamie Cumming (ENG)	Chelsea (ENG)	Undisclosed	

=== Out ===
Date	Pos	Player	Transferred to	Fee	Ref.
30 June 2023	RB	Djavan Anderson (SUR)	Free agent	Released	
30 June 2023	AM	Ben Davis (THA)	Chonburi F.C. (THA)	Released	
30 June 2023	RW	Jodi Jones (MLT)	Notts County (ENG)	Released	
30 June 2023	LW	Will Owens (ENG)	Free agent	Released	
30 June 2023	GK	Kie Plumley (ENG)	Manchester United Under-21s (ENG)	Released	
30 June 2023	RB	Yoav Sade (ISR)	Free agent	Released	
30 June 2023	CF	Slavi Spasov (BUL)	Hungerford Town (ENG)	Released	
30 June 2023	GK	Jack Stevens (ENG)	Cambridge United (ENG)	Free transfer	
30 June 2023	CF	Matty Taylor (ENG)	Forest Green Rovers (ENG)	Released	
5 July 2023	DF	Erion Zabeli (ALB)	Brentford (ENG)	Undisclosed	
18 August 2023	LW	Yanic Wildschut (SUR)	Exeter City (ENG)	Mutual consent	
5 September 2023	GK	Fraser Barnsley (ENG)	Everton (ENG)	Undisclosed	
14 September 2023	CF	Sam Baldock (ENG)	Retired		
21 December 2023	DF	Teddy Mfuni (ENG)	Free agent	Released	
12 January 2024	DM	Alex Rodríguez (SPA)	Forest Green Rovers (ENG)	Undisclosed	
14 June 2024	MF	Oisin Smyth (NIR)	St Mirren (SCO)	Undisclosed	
27 June 2024	CF	Cammy Cooper (SCO)	Airdrieonians F.C. (SCO)	Undisclosed	

=== Loaned in ===
Date	Pos	Player	Loaned from	Date until	Ref.
1 July 2023	GK	James Beadle (ENG)	Brighton & Hove Albion (ENG)	8 January 2024 (Note: On 8 January, Beadle was recalled to Brighton from his season-long loan and was sent out on loan to Sheffield Wednesday.)	
1 July 2023	RB	Fin Stevens (WAL)	Brentford (ENG)	End of season	
27 July 2023	RW	Stanley Mills (ENG)	Everton (ENG)	8 January 2024 (Note: On 8 January, Mills returned to Everton early from his season-long loan because of injury.)	
25 August 2023	CF	Sonny Perkins (ENG)	Leeds United (ENG)	2 January 2024 (Note: On 2 January, Perkins was recalled to Leeds early from his season-long loan.)	
1 September 2023	LW	Kyle Edwards (ENG)	Ipswich Town (ENG)	8 January 2024 (Note: On 8 January, Edwards had his loan deal terminated early because of injury but he remained at Oxford United to recover, with Ipswich Town terminating his contract on 11 January.)	
10 January 2024	FW	Tyler Burey (ENG)	Odense Boldklub (DEN)	End of season	
11 January 2024	GK	Jamie Cumming (ENG)	Chelsea (ENG)	End of season	
1 February 2024	CM	Jay Matete (ENG)	Sunderland (ENG)	27 March 2024 (Note: On 27 March, Matete's loan from Sunderland was cut-short due to a knee injury.)	

=== Loaned out ===
Date	Pos	Player	Loaned to	Date until	Ref.
14 July 2023	CB	Stuart Findlay (SCO)	Kilmarnock (SCO)	End of season	
14 July 2023	LB	Steve Seddon (ENG)	Burton Albion (ENG)	End of season	
31 July 2023	GK	Eddie Brearey (ENG)	St Ives Town (ENG)	1 January 2024	
11 August 2023	RB	James Golding (IRL)	Dartford (ENG)	8 September 2023	
6 October 2023	CM	Joshua Johnson (ENG)	Dartford (ENG)	4 November 2023	
12 January 2023	CM	Zaide Took-Oxley (ENG)	Salisbury (ENG)	20 February 2024 (Note: On 20 February, Took-Oxley was recalled from his loan at Salisbury.)	
12 January 2023	RB	Richard McIntyre (ENG)	Salisbury (ENG)	End of season	
24 January 2024	GK	Edward McGinty (IRL)	Sligo Rovers F.C. (IRL)	End of season	

== Pre-season and friendlies ==
On May 11, The U's announced their first pre-season friendly, against Swansea City at home. A week later, a second fixture was confirmed, against Bristol City. A third pre-season match was announced on 23 May, against Eastleigh. A day later, a fourth friendly was confirmed by the club, against Queens Park Rangers.

Win Draw Loss Fixtures

15 July 2023 Friendly	Oxford United	3–1	Southampton U21	Horspath
12:00 BST	Bodin 22'; O'Donkor 27'; Trialist 88'	Report	Bragg 51'	Stadium: Oxford Sports Park; Attendance: 0 (behind-closed-doors)

18 July 2023 Friendly	Eastleigh	0–0	Oxford United	Eastleigh
19:45 BST		Report		Stadium: Silverlake Stadium

21 July 2023 Friendly	Oxford United	1–0	Swansea City	Littlemore
19:30 BST	Browne 6'	Report		Stadium: Kassam Stadium; Attendance: 3,206 (615 away)

22 July 2023 Friendly	Bristol City	4–1	Oxford United	Bristol
15:00 BST	Conway 13', 54'; Weimann 27'; Knight 50'	Report	O'Donkor 15'	Stadium: Robins High Performance Centre

29 July 2023 Friendly	Oxford United	5–0	Queens Park Rangers	Littlemore
15:00 BST	Brannagan 34'; Harris 59'; Browne 66'; Mills 72'; Thorniley 82'	Report		Stadium: Kassam Stadium; Attendance: 4,587 (1,777 away)

== Competitions ==
=== Overall record ===
Competition	Starting round	Final position	Record							
Competition	Starting round	Final position	Pld	W	D	L	GF	GA	GD	Win %
League One	Matchday 1	5th (play offs)	46	22	11	13	79	56	+23	47.83
FA Cup	First round	Third round	3	2	0	1	6	6	+0	66.67
EFL Cup	First round	First round	1	0	0	1	1	5	−4	0.00
EFL Trophy	Group stage	Round of 16	5	3	0	2	9	4	+5	60.00
Total			55	27	11	17	95	71	+24	49.09

Last updated: 30 April 2024
Source: Soccerway

=== League One ===
==== League table ====
Pos	Team	Pld	W	D	L	GF	GA	GD	Pts	Promotion, qualification or relegation
2	Derby County (P)	46	28	8	10	78	37	+41	92	Promotion to EFL Championship
3	Bolton Wanderers	46	25	12	9	86	51	+35	87	Qualification for League One play-offs
4	Peterborough United	46	25	9	12	89	61	+28	84	Qualification for League One play-offs
5	Oxford United (O, P)	46	22	11	13	79	56	+23	77	Qualification for League One play-offs
6	Barnsley	46	21	13	12	82	64	+18	76	Qualification for League One play-offs
7	Lincoln City	46	20	14	12	65	40	+25	74	
8	Blackpool	46	21	10	15	65	48	+17	73	

Source: EFL Official Website
Rules for classification: 1) Points; 2) Goal difference; 3) Number of goals scored; 4) Head-to-head results; 5) Wins; 6) Away goals; 7) Penalty points (sec 9.5); 8) 12-point sending off offences
(O) Play-off winners; (P) Promoted

==== Results summary ====
Overall								Home						Away					
Pld	W	D	L	GF	GA	GD	Pts	W	D	L	GF	GA	GD	W	D	L	GF	GA	GD
46	22	11	13	79	56	+23	77	11	7	5	44	24	+20	11	4	8	35	32	+3

Last updated: 29 April 2024.
Source: Soccerway

==== Results by round ====
Round	1	2	3	4	5	6	8	9	10	11	12	14	15	16	7^{1}	17	19	20	21	22	13^{2}	21	24	25	26	28	27^{4}	30	18^{3}	31	32	33	34	29^{5}	35	36	37	38	39	40	41	42	43	44	45	46
Ground	A	H	A	A	H	H	A	H	A	H	H	H	A	H	A	A	A	H	A	A	H	A	H	H	A	A	H	A	H	H	A	H	A	H	H	A	H	A	A	A	H	A	H	H	H	A
Result	L	W	W	W	W	L	W	W	W	W	W	D	L	D	W	W	L	D	L	D	W	L	W	L	W	W	L	L	D	D	D	W	D	D	L	L	W	L	W	D	W	W	W	L	D	W
Position	20	12	6	4	1	7	3	2	2	2	2	2	2	2	2	2	3	3	6	5	3	5	5	5	5	5	6	7	6	7	7	6	6	5	6	7	7	8	6	7	7	6	6	6	7	5

Updated to match(es) played on 16 April 2024. Source: Soccerway
A = Away; H = Home; W = Win; D = Draw; L = Loss; P = postponed
Notes:
- ^{1} Matchday 7 (vs Lincoln City) postponed because of international call-ups.
- ^{2} Matchday 13 (vs Reading) postponed because of international call-ups.
- ^{3} Matchday 18 (vs Portsmouth) postponed because of international call-ups.
- ^{4} Matchday 27 (vs Barnsley) postponed because of FA Cup involvement.
- ^{5} Matchday 29 (vs Northampton Town) postponed because of a frozen pitch.

==== Matches ====
On 22 June, the EFL League One fixtures were released.

Win Draw Loss Fixtures

5 August 2023 1	Cambridge United	2–0	Oxford United	Cambridge
15:00 BST	Brophy (yellow card) 10'; Lankester 15' (yellow card) 43'; Ahadme 28'; Janneh (yellow card) 44'; Kachunga (yellow card) 90+5'	Report	Rodrigues (yellow card) 12'	Stadium: Abbey Stadium; Attendance: 7,435; Referee: Sunny Sukhvir Gill

12 August 2023 2	Oxford United	1–0	Carlisle United	Oxford
15:00 BST	Harris 76'	Report	Guy (yellow card) 51'; McCalmont (yellow card) 60'; Back (yellow card) 62'; Huntington (yellow card) 73'	Stadium: Kassam Stadium; Attendance: 7,964; Referee: Jeremy Simpson

15 August 2023 3	Derby County	1–2	Oxford United	Derby
19:45 BST	Collins (yellow card) 27'; Bird (yellow card) 37'; Hourihane (yellow card) 42'; Wilson (yellow card) 68'; Cashin (yellow card) 82'; Waghorn 87'	Report	Harris 32' 72'; Long (yellow card) 52'; Beadle (yellow card) 91'	Stadium: Pride Park Stadium; Attendance: 25,292; Referee: Ben Toner

19 August 2023 4	Barnsley	1–3	Oxford United	Barnsley
15:00 BST	Styles (yellow card) 5'; de Gevigney (yellow card) 22'; Cole 70'; Williams (yellow card) 80'	Report	Brannagan 8' (pen.) (yellow card) 78'; Williams 54' (o.g.); Brown (yellow card) 55'; Goodrham 88'	Stadium: Oakwell Stadium; Attendance: 11,753; Referee: Martin Coy

26 August 2023 5	Oxford United	2–1	Charlton Athletic	Oxford
15:00 BST	Goodrham 10' 85'; McGuane (yellow card) 55'; Brannagan (yellow card) 78'; Mills (yellow card) 83'	Report	Asiimwe (yellow card) 7'; Dobson (yellow card) 29'; Kanu (yellow card) 45+3'; Anderson (yellow card) 61'; May 63'; Jones (yellow card) 73'; Hector (yellow card) 76'	Stadium: Kassam Stadium; Attendance: 8,898; Referee: Adam Herczeg

2 September 2023 6	Oxford United	1–2	Port Vale	Oxford
15:00 BST	Harris (red card) 63'; Leigh 90+3' (yellow card) 20' (yellow-red card) 90+5'; Stevens (yellow card) 90+8'	Report	Ojo (yellow card) 14'; Iacovitti 74'; Devine 90+6' (pen.)	Stadium: Kassam Stadium; Attendance: 8,835; Referee: Sam Purkiss

16 September 2023 8	Fleetwood Town	0–3	Oxford United	Fleetwood
15:00 BST	Robertson (yellow card) 37'; Vela (yellow card) 65'	Report	Mills 16'; Bodin 27'; Edwards 60'	Stadium: Highbury Stadium; Attendance: 3,744; Referee: Will Finnie

23 September 2023 9	Oxford United	3–0	Exeter City	Oxford
15:00 BST	Rodrigues 8'; Brannagan 83' (pen.) 90+4' (pen.)	Report		Stadium: Kassam Stadium; Attendance: 10,022; Referee: Daniel Middleton

30 September 2023 10	Stevenage	1–3	Oxford United	Stevenage
15:00 BST	Reid 15'; Butler (yellow card) 65'	Report	Leigh 23' 55'; Moore (yellow card) 45+4' (goal) 82'; Beadle (yellow card) 90+5'	Stadium: Lamex Stadium; Attendance: 5,512; Referee: Carl Brook

3 October 2023 11	Oxford United	3–0	Shrewsbury Town	Oxford
19:45 BST	Stevens 17'; Brown 59'; Leigh (yellow card) 71' (goal) 90+6'; Goodrham (yellow card) 80'; McEachran (yellow card) 88'	Report	Anderson (yellow card) 47' (yellow-red card) 58'	Stadium: Kassam Stadium; Attendance: 7,212; Referee: Charles Breakspear

7 October 2023 12	Oxford United	2–1	Bristol Rovers	Oxford
12:30 BST	Bodin 13'; Brannagan (yellow card) 15'; Moore (yellow card) 46'; Long 81'; Smyth (yellow card) 90' (yellow-red card) 90+5'; Mills (red card) 90+6'	Report	Martin (yellow card) 48'; Brown (yellow card) 57' (yellow-red card) 63'; Finley (yellow card) 78'; Collins 89'	Stadium: Kassam Stadium; Attendance: 9,439; Referee: Simon Mather

21 October 2023 14	Oxford United	1–1	Blackpool	Oxford
15:00 BST	Leigh 36'	Report	Oakley-Boothe (yellow card) 31'; Dougall (yellow card) 48'; Dale (yellow card) 76'; Rhodes 90+2' (yellow card) 90+5'; Husband (yellow card) 90+7'	Stadium: Kassam Stadium; Attendance: 9,417; Referee: Thomas Kirk

24 October 2023 15	Wigan Athletic	2–0	Oxford United	Wigan
19:45 BST	Humphrys 17'; Adeeko (yellow card) 20'; Shaw (yellow card) 60'; Lang 80' (yellow card) 84'	Report	Gorrín (yellow card) 79'; Beadle (yellow card) 82'	Stadium: DW Stadium; Attendance: 9,108; Referee: David Rock

28 October 2023 16	Oxford United	2–2	Wycombe Wanderers	Oxford
15:00 BST	McGuane (yellow card) 19'; Rodrigues 25'; Long (yellow card) 77'; Moore (yellow card) 90+2'; Brannagan 90+6' (pen.)	Report	Potts (yellow card) 34'; Low (yellow card) 36'; Leahy 56' (pen.) 81' (pen.) (yellow card) 90+1'; Taylor (yellow card) 64'; Pattenden (yellow card) 83'	Stadium: Kassam Stadium; Attendance: 10,168; Referee: Seb Stockbridge

31 October 2023 7	Lincoln City	0–2	Oxford United	Lincoln
19:45 GMT		Report	Brown 13'; Rodrigues (yellow card) 40'; Jensen 64' (o.g.); O'Donkor (yellow card) 89'	Stadium: LNER Stadium; Attendance: 7,114; Referee: Scott Tallis
Note: Fixture was previously postponed because of international call-ups.

11 November 2023 17	Leyton Orient	2–3	Oxford United	Leyton
15:00 BST	Stevens 17' (o. g.); Sotiriou 64'; Brown (yellow card) 67'; Pratley (yellow card) 78'	Report	Rodrigues 32' 47'; Bodin 45+2'; Harris (yellow card) 59'; Moore (yellow card) 66'	Stadium: Brisbane Road; Attendance: 8,614; Referee: Declan Bourne

15 November 2023 19	Cheltenham Town	2–0	Oxford United	Cheltenham
15:00 GMT	Street 34' (red card) 45+2'; Williams (yellow card) 48'; Bevan (yellow card) 72'; Goodwin 76'; Pett (yellow card) 86'	Report	Thorniley (yellow card) 32'; Rodrigues (yellow card) 55' (yellow-red card) 68'; Brannagan (yellow card) 72'	Stadium: The Completely-Suzuki Stadium; Attendance: 5,049; Referee: Scott Simpson

28 November 2023 20	Oxford United	0–0	Bolton Wanderers	Oxford
19:45 BST	Mills (yellow card) 37'; Bodin (yellow card) 45+3'	Report	Thomason (yellow card) 25'; Baxter (yellow card) 45+3'	Stadium: Kassam Stadium; Attendance: 8,899; Referee: Sam Purkiss

9 December 2023 21	Peterborough United	3–0	Oxford United	Peterborough
15:00 GMT	Kyprianou 24'; Jones 34'; Kioso (yellow card) 60'; de Havilland 90+2'	Report	Bodin (yellow card) 63'	Stadium: Weston Homes Stadium; Attendance: 7,921; Referee: James Linington

12 December 2023 13	Reading	1–1	Oxford United	Reading
20:00 BST	Craig (yellow card) 19'; Smith 43'; Holmes (yellow card) 51'	Report	Thorniley (yellow card) 37'; Brown 39'	Stadium: Select Car Leading Stadium; Attendance: 14,397; Referee: Carl Brook

16 December 2023 22	Oxford United	3–0	Burton Albion	Oxford
15:00 BST	Rodrigues 25' 83'; McGuane 89'	Report	Gordon (yellow card) 74'	Stadium: Kassam Stadium; Attendance: 7,438; Referee: Martin Woods

23 December 2023 23	Northampton Town	2–1	Oxford United	Northampton
15:00 GMT	Bowie 50'; Brough (yellow card) 66'; Simpson 90+7' (yellow card) 90+8'	Report	Brannagan 62' (pen.); Brown (yellow card) 90+2'	Stadium: Sixfields Stadium; Attendance: 7,581; Referee: Craig Hicks

26 December 2023 24	Oxford United	2–1	Cambridge United	Oxford
15:00 GMT	Goodrham 54'; Brown (yellow card) 44' (goal) 90+5'; Brannagan (yellow card) 72'	Report	Cousins 30'; Thomas (yellow card) 53'; May (yellow card) 74'; Stevens (yellow card) 90+2'; Brophy (yellow card) 90+4'	Stadium: Kassam Stadium; Attendance: 10,407; Referee: Tom Nield

29 December 2023 25	Oxford United	2–3	Derby County	Oxford
19:45 GMT	Brannagan 2' (pen.), 13'; Beadle (yellow card) 67'	Report	Wildsmith (yellow card) 2'; Bird (yellow card) 24'; Forsyth 45+3'; Barkhuizen (yellow card) 59'; John-Jules (yellow card) 71'; Thompson 81'; Cashin 86'	Stadium: Kassam Stadium; Attendance: 11,219; Referee: Will Finnie

1 January 2024 26	Charlton Athletic	1–2	Oxford United	Charlton
15:00 GMT	Campbell 5'; Jones (yellow card) 60'; Anderson (yellow card) 89'	Report	Harris 22'; McGuane (yellow card) 45+6'; McEachran (yellow card) 53'; Smyth 85'	Stadium: The Valley; Attendance: 13,955; Referee: Alex Chilowicz

13 January 2024 28	Carlisle United	1–3	Oxford United	Carlisle
15:00 GMT	Moxon (yellow card) 27'; Neal (yellow card) 31'; Mellish (yellow card) 43'; McCalmont 71'; Garner (yellow card) 72'	Report	Harris 39' 47'; Bennett (yellow card) 53'; Goodrham 68'; Smyth (yellow card) 72'	Stadium: Brunton Park; Attendance: 7,827; Referee: Jacob Miles

23 January 2024 27	Oxford United	0–1	Barnsley	Oxford
19:45 GMT	Brown (yellow card) 49'; Smyth (yellow card) 88'; Rodrigues (yellow card) 89'	Report	Long 29' (o.g.); Russell (yellow card) 37'; de Gevigney (yellow card) 64'; Cosgrove (yellow card) 77'; O'Keeffe (yellow card) 82'	Stadium: Kassam Stadium; Attendance: 6,703; Referee: Lee Swabey
Note: Fixture was originally scheduled for 6 January, but was postponed because of FA Cup involvement.

27 January 2024 30	Bristol Rovers	3–1	Oxford United	Horfield
15:00 GMT	Martin 16'; Thomas 22'; Wilson (yellow card) 34'; Vale 77'	Report	Stevens (yellow card) 45+2'; Harris 58'	Stadium: Memorial Stadium; Attendance: 9,363 (915 away)

30 January 2024 18	Oxford United	2–2	Portsmouth	Oxford
19:45 BST	Goodrham 45'; Henry 90'	Report	Bishop (yellow card) 58' (goal) 69'; Lang 80'; Peart-Harris (yellow card) 81'	Stadium: Kassam Stadium; Attendance: 8,864; Referee: Darren Drysdale
Note: Fixture was postponed because of international call-ups within the Portsmouth squad.

3 February 2024 31	Oxford United	1–1	Reading	Oxford
12:30 GMT	Harris 32'; Goodrham (yellow card) 65'	Report	Craig (yellow card) 24'; Yiadom (yellow card) 63'; Azeez (yellow card) 71'; Brown 76' (o.g.)	Stadium: Kassam Stadium; Attendance: 10,897; Referee: Scott Oldham
Note: Fixture was moved forward from a 15:00 kick-off after consultation with Thames Valley Police.

10 February 2024 32	Blackpool	1–1	Oxford United	Blackpool
15:00 GMT	Pennington 18'; Lavery (yellow card) 23'; Husband (yellow card) 51'; Byers (yellow card) 87'	Report	Harris 21'; Long (yellow card) 54'	Stadium: Bloomfield Road; Attendance: 10,485; Referee: Paul Howard

13 February 2024 33	Oxford United	4–2	Wigan Athletic	Oxford
19:45 GMT	Dale (yellow card) 39'; Murphy 45+3'; Brannagan 55' (yellow card) 71'; Moore (yellow card) 64'; Rodrigues 76'; Goodrham 90+4'	Report	Hughes (yellow card) 12'; Adeeko (yellow card) 23'; Jones 41' (yellow card) 42'; Sze (yellow card) 69'; Aasgaard 80'	Stadium: The Kassam Stadium; Attendance: 7,320; Referee: Jeremy Simpson

17 February 2024 34	Wycombe Wanderers	0–0	Oxford United	High Wycombe
15:00 GMT		Report	Brannagan (yellow card) 45+2'; Goodrham (yellow card) 52'; Rodrigues (yellow card) 86'	Stadium: Adams Park; Attendance: 6,781; Referee: Simon Mather

20 February 2024 29	Oxford United	2–2	Northampton Town	Oxford
19:45 GMT	Murphy 6'; Goodwin 81'; Rodrigues (yellow card) 89'	Report	Hondermarck 35', (yellow card) 74'; Simpson (yellow card) 78'; Pinnock (yellow card) 82'; Hoskins (yellow card) 90'; Springett 90+2'	Stadium: Kassam Stadium; Attendance: 8,732; Referee: Charles Breakspear
Note: Fixture was originally scheduled for 20 January, but was postponed due to a frozen pitch.

24 February 2024 35	Oxford United	1–2	Leyton Orient	Oxford
15:00 GMT	Murphy (yellow card) 4'; Goodrham 20'; Brown (yellow card) 57'	Report	O'Neill (yellow card) 4', (goal) 51'; El Mizouni (yellow card) 18'; Sotiriou (yellow card) 45+4'; Cooper (yellow card) 50'; Moncur 77'; Forde (yellow card) 81'; Sanders (yellow card) 90+10'	Stadium: The Kassam Stadium; Attendance: 8,884; Referee: Martin Woods

2 March 2024 36	Portsmouth	2–1	Oxford United	Portsmouth
15:00 GMT	Lang 2' (yellow card) 28'; Ogilvie (yellow card) 65'; Saydee 67'; Kamara (yellow card) 81'; Bishop (yellow card) 86'	Report	Brannagan 6' (pen.); Harris (yellow card) 30'; Rodrigues (yellow card) 42'; Henry (yellow card) 90+5'	Stadium: Fratton Park; Attendance: 20,303; Referee: Ben Toner

9 March 2024 37	Oxford United	2–1	Cheltenham Town	Oxford
15:00 GMT	Murphy 45+3'; Brown (yellow card) 76'; Leigh 88'	Report	Sercombe (yellow card) 20'; Davies (yellow card) 61'; Harrop (yellow card) 73'; Ferry 80'	Stadium: The Kassam Stadium; Attendance: 8,738; Referee: Marc Edwards

12 March 2024 38	Bolton Wanderers	5–0	Oxford United	Horwich
20:00 GMT	Ogbeta 19'; Dacres-Cogley 27'; Thomason 59'; Collins 65'; Sheehan 69'	Report	Dale (yellow card) 55'; Brannagan (yellow card) 63'; Brown (yellow card) 72'	Stadium: Toughsheet Community Stadium; Attendance: 19,134; Referee: Sunny Singh Gill
Note: Fixture was initially scheduled for a 19:45 kick-off, but was moved for live Sky Sports coverage.

16 March 2024 39	Port Vale	0–2	Oxford United	Burslem
15:00 GMT	Lowe (yellow card) 20'; Clark (yellow card) 28'	Report	Brown 16'; Murphy 49'	Stadium: Vale Park; Attendance: 5,627; Referee: Jeremy Simpson

29 March 2024 40	Shrewsbury Town	1–1	Oxford United	Shrewsbury
15:00 GMT	Winchester (yellow card) 67'; Price 82' (yellow card) 87'; Flanagan (yellow card) 87'; Maroši (yellow card) 90+2'	Report	Bodin 53'	Stadium: New Meadow; Attendance: 7,340; Referee: Sam Purkiss

1 April 2024 41	Oxford United	4–0	Fleetwood Town	Oxford
15:00 BST	Brannagan 14'; Harris 30', 83'; Dale 43'	Report	Sarpong-Wiredu (yellow card) 35'; Lawal (yellow card) 48'	Stadium: Kassam Stadium; Attendance: 8,631; Referee: Scott Jackson

6 April 2024 42	Burton Albion	0–4	Oxford United	Burton upon Trent
15:00 BST	Powell (yellow card) 50'; Brayford (yellow card) 83'	Report	Harris 24', 57'; Murphy 62'; Henry 69'	Stadium: Pirelli Stadium; Attendance: 3,700; Referee: Will Finnie

13 April 2024 43	Oxford United	5–0	Peterborough United	Oxford
15:00 BST	Harris 19' (pen.); Murphy 31'; Rodrigues 38', 58'; Bodin 89'	Report		Stadium: Kassam Stadium; Attendance: 10,046; Referee: Andy Davies

16 April 2024 44	Oxford United	0–1	Lincoln City	Oxford
19:45 BST	Rodrigues (yellow card) 63'; Browne (yellow card) 73'; McGuane (yellow card) 89'; Brannagan (yellow card) 90+3'	Report	Mitchell (yellow card) 16'; Duffy (yellow card) 20' (yellow-red card) 83'; Mandroiu 47' (pen.), (yellow card) 79'; O'Connor (yellow card) 49'; Taylor (yellow card) 75'; House (yellow card) 90+5'; Erhahon (yellow card) 90+6'	Stadium: Kassam Stadium; Attendance: 9,587; Referee: Lee Swabey

19 April 2024 45	Oxford United	1–1	Stevenage	Oxford
20:00 BST	Brannagan 58' (pen.)	Report	Vancooten (yellow card) 10'; Long 32' (o.g.); Guinness-Walker (yellow card) 71'; Smith (yellow card) 88'	Stadium: Kassam Stadium; Attendance: 9,174; Referee: Tom Nield
Note: Fixture was initially scheduled for 20 April, but was moved for live Sky Sports coverage.

27 April 2024 46	Exeter City	1–2	Oxford United	Exeter
12:30 BST	Alli 52'	Report	Harris 12'; Brannagan 40' (pen.)	Stadium: St James Park; Attendance: 8,123; Referee: Tom Reeves

==== Play-offs ====
Oxford United finished 5th in the regular 2023–24 EFL League One season, so were drawn against 4th-placed Peterborough United in the play-off semi final. As the side which finished lower in the league, Oxford hosted the first round at their home ground, the Kassam Stadium, with the second round held at Peterborough's home ground, the London Road Stadium.

4 May 2024 Semi-Final, First leg	Oxford United	1–0	Peterborough United	Oxford
19:45 BST	Rodrigues (yellow card) 30'; Bennett (yellow card) 44'; Moore 53'	Report	Mason-Clarke (yellow card) 77'; Katongo (yellow card) 90+3'	Stadium: Kassam Stadium; Attendance: 11,125; Referee: Lewis Smith

8 May 2024 Semi-Final, Second leg	Peterborough United	1–1 (1–2 agg.)	Oxford United	Peterborough
20:00 BST	Knight 41'	Report	Brannagan 45+3' (pen.)	Stadium: London Road Stadium; Referee: Andrew Kitchen

18 May 2024 Final	Bolton Wanderers	0–2	Oxford United	London
16:15 BST	Jones (yellow card) 47'; Dempsey (yellow card) 68'; Baxter (yellow card) 72'; Thomason (yellow card) 77'	Report	Murphy 31', 42'; Goodrham (yellow card) 90+8'	Stadium: Wembley Stadium; Attendance: 70,472; Referee: Sam Barrott

=== FA Cup ===
The U's were drawn at home to Maidenhead United in the first round and away to Coventry City in the third round.

Win Draw Loss Fixtures

4 November 2023 First Round	Oxford United	2–0	Maidenhead United	Oxford
15:00 GMT	Bodin 15' 83'; Rodrigues (yellow card) 85'	Report	Mitchell-Lawson (yellow card) 46'	Stadium: Kassam Stadium; Attendance: 4,094; Referee: Dale Baines

2 December 2023 Second Round	Oxford United	2–0	Grimsby Town	Oxford
15:00 GMT	McGuane 11'; Bodin 75'	Report	Hunt (yellow card) 62'	Stadium: Kassam Stadium; Attendance: 4,149; Referee: Darren Bond

6 January 2024 Third round	Coventry City	6–2	Oxford United	Coventry
12:30 GMT	Latibeaudiere 8'; Sheaf 11' (yellow card) 90+1' Palmer 17' O'Hare 50' (pen.) Godden 84' 88'	Report	Harris 10'; Brannagan (yellow card) 15' Rodrigues (yellow card) 30' McEachran (yellow card) 32' Goodrham 79'	Stadium: Coventry Building Society Arena; Attendance: 18,211; Referee: Josh Smith

=== EFL Cup ===
Oxford were drawn away to Bristol City in the first round.

Win Draw Loss Fixtures

9 August 2023 First round	Bristol City	5–1	Oxford United	Ashton Gate
19:45 BST	Cornick 15'; Knight 35', 47'; Wells 51'; Dickie (yellow card) 55'; Naismith 62'; Roberts (yellow card) 90+7'	Report	Bodin 30'; Brown (yellow card) 45+4'; Murphy (yellow card) 70'; Rodrigues (yellow card) 89'	Stadium: Ashton Gate Stadium; Attendance: 9,661; Referee: Ollie Yates

=== EFL Trophy ===
The Group stage draw was finalised on 22 June 2023. After coming second in the group, Oxford were drawn away to Forest Green Rovers in the second round and to either Portsmouth or AFC Wimbledon in the third round.

Pos	Div	Team	Pld	W	PW	PL	L	GF	GA	GD	Pts	Qualification
1	L2	Milton Keynes Dons	3	3	0	0	0	8	3	+5	9	Advance to Round 2
2	L1	Oxford United	3	2	0	0	1	8	2	+6	6	Advance to Round 2
3	ACA	Chelsea U21	3	0	1	0	2	3	11	−8	2	
4	L1	Northampton Town	3	0	0	1	2	5	8	−3	1	

Updated to match(es) played on 7 November 2023. Source: EFL.com

Win Draw Loss Fixtures

5 September 2023 Group stage	Northampton Town	1–3	Oxford United	Northampton
19:00 BST	Simpson 4' (pen.); McWilliams (yellow card) 32'; McGowan (yellow card) 58'; Dyche (red card) 76'	Report	Harris 15' (pen.), 61'; Murphy (yellow card) 44'; Edwards 48'	Stadium: Sixfields Stadium; Attendance: 1,608; Referee: Garreth Rhodes

19 September 2023 Group stage	Oxford United	0–1	Milton Keynes Dons	Oxford
19:00 BST	McEachran (yellow card) 49'	Report	Stewart (yellow card) 4'; Tomlinson (yellow card) 39'; Lewington (yellow card) 45'; Payne 56' (pen.); Tripp (yellow card) 67'; Harvie (yellow card) 69'	Stadium: Kassam Stadium; Attendance: 1,588; Referee: Alan Young

7 November 2023 Group stage	Oxford United	5–0	Chelsea U21	Oxford
19:00 GMT	Perkins 15'; Thorniley 18' (yellow card) 88'; Murphy 71', 78'; Harris 90+1'	Report	Gee (yellow card) 82'	Stadium: Kassam Stadium; Attendance: 1,298; Referee: James Durkin

5 December 2023 Round of 32	Forest Green Rovers	0–1	Oxford United	Nailsworth
19:00 GMT	Inniss (yellow card) 13'; Omotoye (yellow card) 39'	Report	Goodrham 49'; Gorrín (yellow card) 53'; Negru (yellow card) 82'	Stadium: The New Lawn; Attendance: 494; Referee: Ollie Yates

9 January 2024 Round of 16	AFC Wimbledon	2–0	Oxford United	Wimbledon
19:45 GMT	Tilley 21', 50'; Johnson (yellow card) 67'; Kalambayi (yellow card) 74'	Report	Eastwood (red card) 89'	Stadium: Plough Lane; Attendance: 1,316; Referee: Declan Bourne

== Top scorers ==
As of 19 May 2024

Place	Position	Nation	Number	Name	League One	FA Cup	League Cup	FL Trophy	Total
1	FW	(Wales)	9	Mark Harris	15	1	0	3	19
2	MF	(England)	8	Cameron Brannagan	13	0	0	0	13
3	MF	(England)	19	Tyler Goodrham	8	1	0	1	10
3	MF	(England)	23	Josh Murphy	8	0	0	2	10
4	FW	(Wales)	10	Billy Bodin	5	3	1	0	9
5	FW	(Portugal)	20	Rúben Rodrigues	8	0	0	0	8
7	DF	(Jamaica)	22	Greg Leigh	6	0	0	0	6
8	DF	(Northern Ireland)	3	Ciaron Brown	4	0	0	0	4
9	FW	(England)	29	Kyle Edwards	1	0	0	1	2
9	MF	(England)	18	Marcus McGuane	1	1	0	0	2
9	MF	(Northern Ireland)	17	James Henry	2	0	0	0	2
9	DF	(England)	5	Elliott Moore	2	0	0	0	2
12	FW	(England)	7	Stanley Mills	1	0	0	0	1
12	DF	(Wales)	15	Fin Stevens	1	0	0	0	1
12	DF	(England)	2	Sam Long	1	0	0	0	1
12	DF	(England)	4	Jordan Thorniley	0	0	0	1	1
12	FW	(England)	16	Sonny Perkins	0	0	0	1	1
12	MF	(Northern Ireland)	14	Oisin Smyth	1	0	0	0	1
12	FW	(England)	25	Will Goodwin	1	0	0	0	1
12	FW	(England)	30	Owen Dale	1	0	0	0	1
TOTALS					70	6	1	9	95
