= Jordan Thorniley =

English footballer (born 1996)

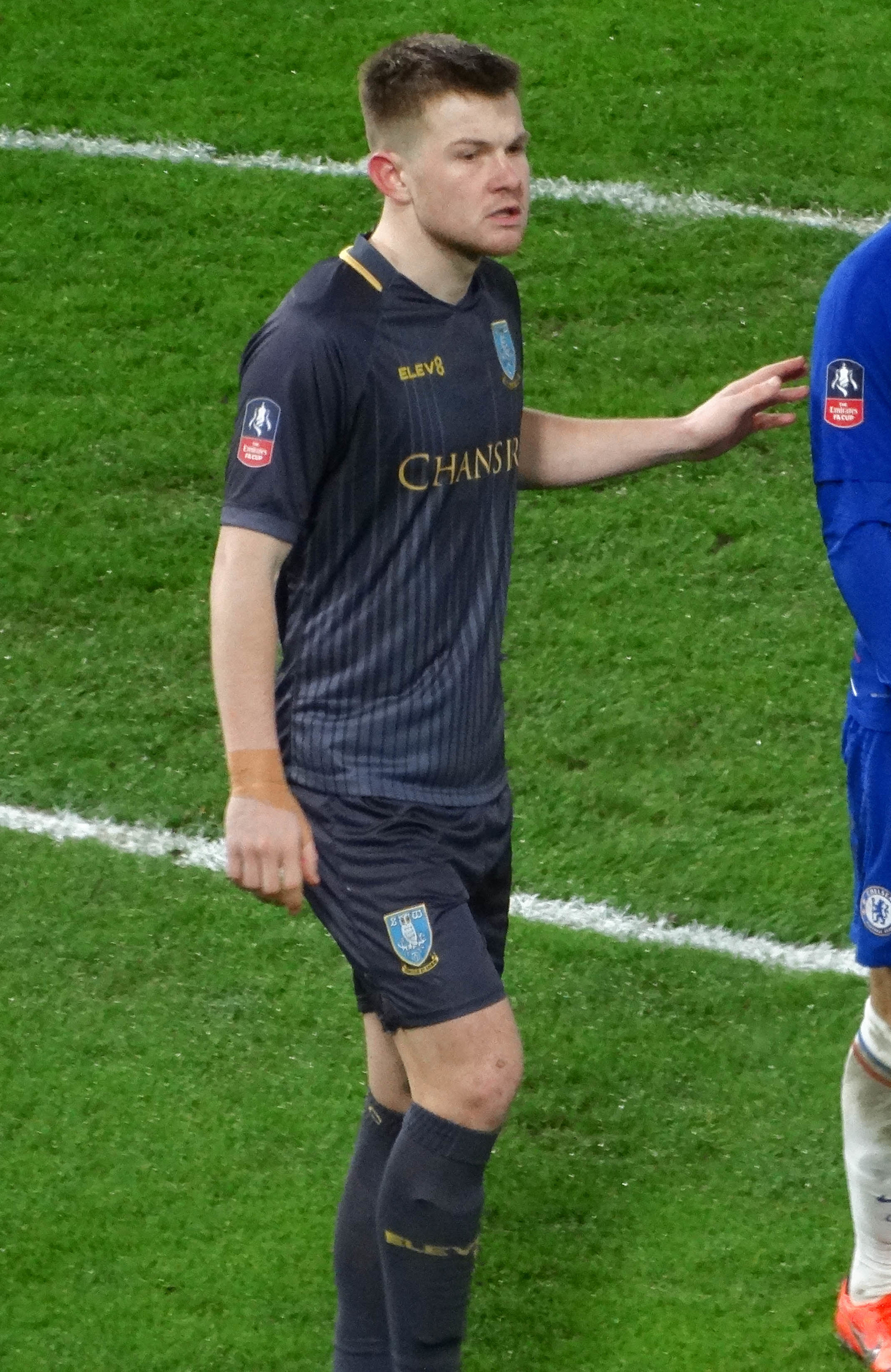
- Thorniley in 2019

Personal information
- Full name: Jordan Luke Thorniley
- Date of birth: 24 November 1996 (age 29)
- Place of birth: Warrington, England
- Height: 5 ft 11 in (1.81 m)
- Position: Centre-back

Youth career
- –2015: Everton

Senior career*
| Years | Team | Apps | (Gls) |
| 2015–2016 | Everton | 0 | (0) |
| 2015 | → Stockport County (loan) | 10 | (0) |
| 2016–2020 | Sheffield Wednesday | 31 | (0) |
| 2017–2018 | → Accrington Stanley (loan) | 14 | (0) |
| 2020–2023 | Blackpool | 65 | (1) |
| 2021–2022 | → Oxford United (loan) | 21 | (0) |
| 2023–2026 | Oxford United | 10 | (0) |
| 2025–2026 | → Northampton Town (loan) | 17 | (0) |
- * Club domestic league appearances and goals as of 16:14, 30 December 2025 (UTC)

Jordan Luke Thorniley (born 24 November 1996) is an English professional footballer who plays as a centre-back.

== Career ==
=== Everton ===
Thorniley began playing football at Rope and Anchor JFC Warrington, for whom he played in the U6 to U11 sides. He then joined Everton at the age of 10 and progressed through the ranks of their youth academy. While at the academy, Thorniley captained Everton Under-18s side and helped the side win the Premier League title for the second time in a row.

At the end of the 2014–15 season, Thorniley was offered a new contract, leading him to turning professional in July 2015. Shortly after signing a professional contract with Everton, he moved on loan to Stockport County that same month. He made his Stockport County debut on 10 August 2015, where he played 90 minutes, in a 2–1 win over Boston United. Thorniley went on to make 10 appearances for the side before returning to his parent club in October 2015.

After his loan spell at Stockport County came to an end, Thorniley then featured for the U21 side for the remainder of the season. At the end of the 2015–16 season, Thorniley was released by the club. Following his release, he reflected his time at Everton, saying: "Everton are a well run club. It was a good environment to be in. It didn't go to plan my first year as a pro but other than that I can't fault it. It probably laid down the foundations of where I am now as well as a lot of help from Sheffield Wednesday. They laid down the pillars if you like for me to develop."

=== Sheffield Wednesday ===
After being released by Everton, Thorniley signed for Championship side Sheffield Wednesday in July 2016,

Although he first appeared as unused substitute for the match against Cambridge United, which they lost 2–1 in extra time in the first round of the League Cup, Thorniley spent most of the 2016–17 season playing for the side. He then was featured under Carlos Carvalhal throughout the pre-season ahead of the 2017–18 season.

On 29 August 2017, Thorniley was loaned out to League Two side Accrington Stanley until January. Thorniley made his Accrington Stanley debut, where he started the whole game in the left-back position, in a 2–1 win over Morecambe on 2 September 2017. Since making his debut for the club, he quickly established himself in the starting eleven, in which he played in the left-back position. He continued starting the side until he suffered an injury in late-December. As result, Thorniley returned to his parent club on 4 January 2018.

Shortly after his loan spell at Accrington Stanley came to an end, Thorniley appeared as an unused substitute in a 0–0 draw against rivals Sheffield United on 12 January 2018. He then made his Sheffield Wednesday debut, starting alongside Frederico Venâncio and Daniel Pudil in a three-man defence, in a 0–0 draw against Cardiff City on 20 January 2018. After the match, his debut performance was praised by Manager Jos Luhukay. Thorniley was then given a handful of first team opportunities for the next five matches. As a result, on 15 February 2018, Thorniley signed a new contract with the club, keeping him until 2021. However, in a 2–1 loss against Millwall on 20 February 2018, Thorniley collided with Jed Wallace in the lead up to the Lions' second goal, leading him to be taken off on a stretcher and was substituted as a result. After treatment at the hospital, it was concluded that Thorniley's injury was not as serious as first feared.

In the 2018–19 season, Thorniley returned to training in the club's pre-season. It wasn't until on 11 August 2018 when he made his first appearance of the season, coming on as a substitute for Morgan Fox in the 44th minutes, in a 1–1 draw against Hull City. Since returning to the first team, Thorniley received a handful of first team appearances for the side, playing in either the centre-back and left-back positions. However, he suffered a calf injury and was substituted as a result during a 2–1 loss against Nottingham Forest on 19 September 2018. After missing one match, Thorniley returned to the starting line-up, starting the whole game, in a 1–1 draw against Leeds United on 28 September 2018. However, after returning to the first team, he found himself placed on the substitute bench, due to a strong competitions in the club's defence. Between 9 February 2019 and 16 February 2019, Thorniley started three matches, playing all in the centre-back position. Following this, he found himself back to the sidelined, due to his fitness concern and placed on the substitute bench for the rest of the 2018–19 season. Despite this, Thorniley went on to make twenty-two appearances in all competitions.

Ahead of the 2019–20 season, Thorniley left the club's pre-season training camp in Portugal after picking up an injury. Thorniley responded to claims that he's not injury as a reason for leaving the club's pre-season training camp in Portugal but rather personal reason. However, Thorniley found himself behind the pecking order in the club's defence competitions. Despite this, he made two appearances for the side this season, both coming from the League Cup.

=== Blackpool ===
On 1 January 2020, Thorniley joined Blackpool for an undisclosed fee, on a two-and-a-half-year contract, with Blackpool having an option to extend it by a further year. Upon joining Blackpool, he cited first team football for the reason to join the club and was given a number four shirt.

In August 2021, he moved on loan to Oxford United. He returned to Blackpool on 24 January 2022.

On 14 March 2023, Thorniley scored his first professional goal in Blackpool's 6–1 win against Queens Park Rangers.

=== Oxford United ===
In June 2023, it was announced that he would sign for Oxford United on 1 July 2023.

On 17 July 2025, Thorniley joined League One side Northampton Town on a season-long loan deal. On 5 January 2026, it was announced that he had been recalled from loan. His contract with Oxford was terminated by mutual consent in February 2026.

== Personal life ==
Thorniley is a son of former rugby player Tony Thorniley, who played for Warrington Wolves.

== Career statistics ==
As of 29 December 2025

Appearances and goals by club, season and competition
| Club | Season | League | | | FA Cup | | League Cup | | Other | | Total | |
| Club | Season | Division | Apps | Goals | Apps | Goals | Apps | Goals | Apps | Goals | Apps | Goals |
|---|---|---|---|---|---|---|---|---|---|---|---|---|
| Everton | 2015–16 | Premier League | 0 | 0 | 0 | 0 | 0 | 0 | 0 | 0 | 0 | 0 |
| Stockport County (loan) | 2015–16 | National League North | 10 | 0 | 0 | 0 | — | | 0 | 0 | 10 | 0 |
| Sheffield Wednesday | 2016–17 | Championship | 0 | 0 | 0 | 0 | 0 | 0 | 0 | 0 | 0 | 0 |
| Sheffield Wednesday | 2017–18 | Championship | 11 | 0 | 0 | 0 | 0 | 0 | 0 | 0 | 11 | 0 |
| Sheffield Wednesday | 2018–19 | Championship | 20 | 0 | 2 | 0 | 0 | 0 | 0 | 0 | 22 | 0 |
| Sheffield Wednesday | Total | | 31 | 0 | 2 | 0 | 0 | 0 | 0 | 0 | 33 | 0 |
| Accrington Stanley (loan) | 2017–18 | League Two | 14 | 0 | 2 | 0 | 0 | 0 | 1 (Note: Appearances in the EFL Trophy.) | 0 | 17 | 0 |
| Blackpool | 2019–20 | League One | 2 | 0 | 0 | 0 | 0 | 0 | 0 | 0 | 2 | 0 |
| Blackpool | 2020–21 | League One | 19 | 0 | 1 | 0 | 1 | 0 | 6 (Note: 4 appearances in the EFL Trophy; 2 appearances in the play-offs.) | 0 | 27 | 0 |
| Blackpool | 2021–22 | Championship | 14 | 0 | 0 | 0 | 0 | 0 | 0 | 0 | 14 | 0 |
| Blackpool | 2022–23 | Championship | 30 | 1 | 2 | 0 | 1 | 0 | 0 | 0 | 33 | 1 |
| Blackpool | Total | | 65 | 1 | 3 | 0 | 2 | 0 | 6 | 0 | 76 | 1 |
| Oxford United (loan) | 2021–22 | League One | 21 | 0 | 2 | 0 | 1 | 0 | 1 | 0 | 25 | 0 |
| Oxford United | 2023–24 | League One | 8 | 0 | 3 | 0 | 1 | 0 | 5 | 1 | 17 | 1 |
| Oxford United | 2024–25 | Championship | 2 | 0 | 1 | 0 | 1 | 0 | 0 | 0 | 4 | 0 |
| Oxford United | 2025–26 | Championship | 0 | 0 | 0 | 0 | 0 | 0 | 0 | 0 | 0 | 0 |
| Oxford United | Total | | 10 | 0 | 4 | 0 | 2 | 0 | 5 | 1 | 21 | 1 |
| Northampton Town (loan) | 2025–26 | League One | 17 | 0 | 1 | 0 | 0 | 0 | 3 | 0 | 21 | 0 |
| Career total | | | 170 | 1 | 5 | 0 | 5 | 0 | 16 | 1 | 202 | 2 |

== Honours ==
Accrington Stanley

- EFL League Two: 2017–18

Blackpool

- EFL League One play-offs: 2021
