= Max Woltman =

English footballer (born 2003)

Personal information
- Full name: Max Reuben Woltman
- Date of birth: 20 August 2003 (age 23)
- Place of birth: Wirral, England
- Positions: Forward; attacking midfielder

Team information
- Current team: Buxton

Youth career
- 2010–2021: Liverpool

Senior career*
Years	Team	Apps	(Gls)
2021–2023	Liverpool	0	(0)
2022–2023	→ Doncaster Rovers (loan)	13	(0)
2023–2025	Oxford United	0	(0)
2025–2026	Macclesfield	8	(0)
2026	Southport	11	(0)
2026–	Buxton	0	(0)
- * Club domestic league appearances and goals as of 10:30, 30 June 2026 (UTC)

Max Reuben Woltman (born 20 August 2003) is an English footballer who plays as a forward or attacking midfielder for National League North club Buxton.

== Career ==
Woltman joined Liverpool as a seven-year-old, moving through the club's youth structure until he joined the under-18 team for the 2019–20 season. In January 2021 he signed his first professional contract with the club. In the 2021–22 season he became a regular for the under-23 team in the Premier League 2. On 7 December 2021, Woltman made his debut for Liverpool as a late substitute during a 2–1 win in the club's final Champions League group match against Milan.

On 1 September 2022 he joined Doncaster Rovers on a season-long loan. His loan spell was cut short when Woltman was recalled to Liverpool on 16 January 2023.

On 3 August 2023 he signed for Oxford United for an undisclosed fee. He made his debut in an away victory over Northampton Town in the group stage of the EFL Trophy on 5 September 2023. He departed the club upon the expiry of his contract at the end of the 2024–25 season.

In October 2025, Woltman joined National League North club Macclesfield on a short-term deal. He made his Silkmen debut on 1 November 2025, in a 6–3 win over AFC Totton at the Leasing.com Stadium in the first round of the 2025–26 FA Cup.

Woltman left Macclesfield to sign for fellow National League North side Southport in February 2026. He made his debut for the club in a 5–1 home league win against Hereford at Haig Avenue on 15 February 2026.

In June 2026, he moved to National League North club Buxton.

== Career statistics ==
As of match played 18 April 2026

Appearances and goals by club, season and competition
Club	Season	League			FA Cup		EFL Cup		Europe		Other		Total	
Club	Season	Division	Apps	Goals	Apps	Goals	Apps	Goals	Apps	Goals	Apps	Goals	Apps	Goals
Liverpool U21	2021–22	—			—		—		—		3 (Note: Appearance(s) in the EFL Trophy)	0	3	0
Liverpool U21	2022–23	—			—		—		—		1	0	1	0
Liverpool U21	Total		0	0	0	0	0	0	0	0	4	0	4	0
Liverpool	2021–22	Premier League	0	0	1	0	0	0	1 (Note: Appearance in UEFA Champions League)	0	—		2	0
Doncaster Rovers (loan)	2022–23	League Two	13	0	1	0	0	0	—		0	0	14	0
Oxford United	2023–24	League One	0	0	0	0	0	0	—		3	0	3	0
Oxford United	2024–25	Championship	0	0	0	0	0	0	—		—		0	0
Oxford United	Total		0	0	0	0	0	0	0	0	3	0	3	0
Macclesfield	2025–26	National League North	8	0	2	0	—		—		2 (Note: Appearances in FA Trophy)	0	12	0
Southport	2025–26	National League North	11	0	—		—		—		0	0	11	0
Career total			32	0	4	0	0	0	1	0	9	0	46	0
