= 2009–10 Oxford United F.C. season =

English football club season

Oxford United F.C.
2009–10 season
- Chairman: Kelvin Thomas
- Manager: Chris Wilder
- Stadium: Kassam Stadium
- Conference Premier: 3rd (promoted through play-offs)
- FA Cup: Second round
- FA Trophy: Fourth round
- Top goalscorer: League: James Constable (22); All: James Constable (24)
- Highest home attendance: 11,963 (v Rushden & Diamonds 3 May 2010 (League Play-off Semi-final second leg))
- Lowest home attendance: 3,296 (v Thurrock 24 October 2009 (FA Cup))

Oxford United F.C. season 2009–10 was the 61st season since Oxford United Football Club turned professional and their 4th season in the Conference Premier. It was their 116th year in existence as a football club and their 110th season of competitive football. In the previous season Oxford United finished seventh in the Conference Premier, four points and two places outside the play-offs after being docked five points for fielding an unregistered player. This article covers the period from 1 July 2009 to 30 June 2010.

During the pre-season, Alfie Potter was brought in on a season-long loan, Rhys Day was signed on a free transfer, and Andy Melville returned as first-team coach. The club also received a large cash windfall of at least £668,000 following the transfer of former player Dean Whitehead from Sunderland to Stoke City. United spent twenty games at the top of the table following seventeen victories from their first twenty-four games. However, only nine wins from the remaining games saw the team fall back into the play-off places, eventually finishing third. A 3–1 aggregate victory over Rushden & Diamonds in the play-offs saw United return to Wembley for the first time in 24 years to face York City. Goals from Matt Green, James Constable and Potter earned United a 3–1 victory that saw them return to the Football League.

Once again James Constable was the club's top goalscorer in all competitions, scoring 24 times, 22 of those coming in the league, one in the FA Cup and one in the play-off final. Thirty-three players represented Oxford throughout the season, with five different nationalities represented. The attendance of 11,963 against Rushden & Diamonds in the play-off semi-final second leg was the highest home attendance of the season, as well as being the second highest ever recorded at the Kassam Stadium.

== Review ==
=== Pre-season ===
Oxford announced a number of pre-season fixtures, including a two-game tour to Scotland to face Morton and Rangers. Other pre-season fixtures included games at home to Queens Park Rangers and Peterborough United, a visit to local rivals Oxford City and finally a match against an Aston Villa XI. Joe Burnell was released on 2 July, and was signed by Exeter City eight days later. Alfie Potter was signed on a season-long loan from Peterborough United on 3 July, and ten days later former defender and Welsh international Andy Melville returned to the club as first-team coach. Rhys Day also joined in July, signing on a two-year deal. A welcome windfall to the club was announced on 24 July after the sale of former player Dean Whitehead, from Sunderland to Stoke City. Oxford received 25% of the transfer fee, at least £668,750.

=== August ===
Oxford started off the season with a 2–1 home win against York City, the two goals coming in the last three minutes. This was followed by a 1–1 draw away at Kettering Town. Another away game followed, this time a 4–3 victory against Histon. Oxford went top of the league after a 4–0 win against Chester City, followed by a 2–1 home win against Stevenage Borough. Ross Perry and Steven Kinniburgh were signed on loan from Rangers, while Chris Carruthers was loaned out to Crawley Town. A 1–0 win away to AFC Wimbledon, followed by a goalless draw with Forest Green Rovers, kept Oxford unbeaten, and manager Chris Wilder was awarded manager of the month.

=== September ===
Jamie Cook was signed on the transfer deadline using a 12th Man scheme where supporters helped to pay the transfer fee. A 2–0 win over Ebbsfleet United maintained Oxford's lead at the top of the Conference. Luton Town were the next visitors to the Kassam Stadium, the game being delayed by fifteen minutes due to crowd congestion. A crowd of over 10,000 saw United win 2–0, despite a missed Constable penalty in the third minute. Youngster Sam Deering was loaned out to Conference South team Newport County for one month to regain full fitness after breaking his leg last year. This was followed up with a 1–0 win at Wrexham. On 16 September, it was announced that the 68 clubs playing in the Conference would each receive a share of £1,000,000 from the Premier League. A 4–0 win against Eastbourne Borough sent United eight points clear at the top of the table, before they fell to their first defeat of the season, away at Mansfield Town. Oxford next travelled to the North East, where they beat Gateshead 1–0 thanks to a Matt Green goal. The U's rounded off September with a 3–1 win over Crawley Town.

=== October ===
At the start of the month Chris Wilder was once again awarded manager of the month, with Ryan Clarke awarded player of the month after keeping five clean sheets out of seven games. The lead at the top was reduced to 6 points after a 1–1 draw at Barrow. A behind-the-scenes friendly was played against Watford mid-week to give players without game time a run out, the result being 1–0 to Oxford. The biggest winning margin of the season followed, with a 5–0 thrashing of Grays Athletic. A late equaliser from Simon Clist gave United a 1–1 draw away at York City. The fourth qualifying round of the FA Cup followed, with a 2–0 win over Thurrock. Damian Batt's first goal for the club gave the U's a 1–0 win over Altrincham. Before the FA Cup tie against Yeovil Town, Oxford beat Leicester City 4–0 in a behind-closed-doors friendly, and on the same day Shane Killock and Alex Rhodes left the club.

=== November ===
This was followed, at the start of November, by progress into the second round of the FA Cup after taking the League scalp of Yeovil Town 1–0. United then fell to only their second defeat of the season, losing 3–1 at Kidderminster. Oxford bounced back with 1–0 wins at home against Barrow, and away at Forest Green Rovers. Strikers Francis Green and Onome Sodje were brought in on loan to cover for the slight shortages in strikers. Neither loanee featured in Oxford's 1–1 home draw against Barrow in the FA Cup, which meant a replay at Holker Street, the third fixture between the two sides in as many weeks.

=== December ===
At half-time on 1 December, United's long stay at the top of the table looked to be coming to an end. United were 1–0 down at Crawley, and Stevenage, just two points behind at the start of play, were winning 1–0. But in an eventful last ten minutes United equalised in the 83rd minute, James Constable had a penalty saved and then made amends with a winning goal in the 4th minute of injury time. Meanwhile, Stevenage had conceded two second-half goals to lose their game, leaving them five points behind United. Oxford maintained this lead, and their winning run, with a comfortable 4–2 home victory over Ebbsfleet, but in their FA Cup replay at Barrow they were comprehensively and uncharacteristically beaten 3–1, denying them a lucrative 3rd-round tie with Premiership side Sunderland. A home victory over Hayes and Yeading in the 1st round of the FA Trophy was scant consolation, though it provided competitive match action for some of United's squad players. Cold weather meant that the away fixture against Cambridge United and the home game on Boxing Day against Rushden & Diamonds were postponed, the latter somewhat controversially and with a large crowd expected. Wilder's first year in charge had ended with a remarkable record of 33 wins from 46 league games. In their final match of the year, and their first league game for more than three weeks, United drew 1–1 away at Salisbury City to finish the year two points clear at the top of the table with games in hand over their nearest rivals.

=== January ===
This was a frustrating month for Oxford United. Heavy snow and freezing temperatures meant that several of their games were postponed. Oxford played just one league game between 5 December and 16 January, the 1–1 draw with Salisbury. They ultimately lost top spot in the league, though gaining games in hand. Oxford's first game of 2010 was also their first home loss of the season, against Tamworth. Despite beating Grays Athletic in their second and last league game of January, Oxford failed to regain first position, due to Stevenage's results. They made progress in the FA Trophy, however, beating Woking at home and Chelmsford City away to reach the fourth round. Oxford also progressed to the semi-finals of the Oxfordshire Senior Cup by beating Kidlington.

=== February ===
A goalless draw at home to Kidderminster was enough to see United back to the top of the table on goal difference. After 90 minutes Oxford led 1–0 in the crunch fixture at Luton, but two goals in injury time, the second direct from a corner kick, saw the home team gain an important victory. As before this season, Oxford followed a rare defeat with a run of good results, in this case home wins against Histon, Rushden & Diamonds and AFC Wimbledon, which saw them reopen some breathing space at the top of the table. During that league run United were, however, knocked out of the FA Trophy by Kidderminster.

=== March ===
United's fortunes dipped dramatically in March, though there had already been signs in 2010 that their dominance of the league was waning. A draw away at Cambridge was followed by a shock home defeat to part-time Hayes and Yeading (both Hayes goals scored by former Oxford striker Steve Basham), then further lacklustre draws with Kettering, Tamworth and Rushden & Diamonds. A 2–1 home victory over Gateshead on 27th was United's first win in March and boosted the supporters' hopes for the upcoming "six-pointer" against in-form Stevenage. These hopes were dashed when Stevenage won by a penalty, leaving United 8 points behind the new leaders. United's poor form was compounded by impressively consistent results from their nearest rivals: United's return from the month was a mere 7 points from a potential 21, whereas Stevenage earned a maximum 21 from 21 and Luton 22 from 24. Luton also benefited from the confirmed expulsion of Chester City from the league on 8 March; having drawn home and away with Chester earlier in the season they dropped just 2 points, whereas Oxford lost 3 points, and Stevenage 6.

=== April ===
United lost again to Hayes & Yeading in the away fixture. The part-timers (beaten 8–0 by Luton in their previous fixture) thus completed an unlikely league double over the former league leaders. This was the first time United had lost consecutive league games all season. They secured a much-needed home win over Salisbury with a late Alfie Potter goal on 5 April, and were boosted by AFC Wimbledon's failure to beat York City on 7th, ensuring a play-off place for United, though their chance of automatic promotion as champions looked to be gone as the end of the season loomed. With the pressure eased, United's form improved as the month progressed; after the Salisbury match they won three of their next four fixtures (beating Altrincham away and Mansfield and Wrexham at home, and drawing at Cambridge). An experimental eleven lost 1–0 to Eastbourne, ending a run of 5 matches without conceding, on the last day of the regular season. United thus finished in third place in the table, behind Luton and promoted Stevenage, and due to play fourth-placed Rushden and Diamonds in the play-off semi-finals.

=== Play-offs ===
United took the lead through James Constable in the first leg of their play-off semi-final away to Rushden & Diamonds, before the home side equalised; the game finished 1–1. In the second leg at the Kassam Stadium, second-half goals from Constable and Matt Green confirmed Oxford's place in the Wembley final. In the other semi-final, fifth-placed York City beat league runners-up Luton Town 1–0 in both legs.

Over 33,000 Oxford supporters travelled to Wembley to see Oxford take on York on 16 May. United were two up after 21 minutes, through Green and Constable, before an own goal by goalkeeper Ryan Clarke shortly before half-time made it 2–1. United sealed a 3–1 victory through a breakaway goal in stoppage time, scored by Alfie Potter. Tens of thousands of fans turned up for an open-top bus parade through Oxford two days later.

== Team kit ==
This season's team kit supplier was the American brand Nike, via JustSport, this season being the first in a three-year deal. The club's main sponsor was Buildbase, a UK-based building company in their 9th year of sponsorship.

Home colours	Away colours	Home goalkeeper

== Match fixtures & results ==
=== Legend ===
Win	Draw	Loss

Oxford United results are given first

=== Friendlies ===
Date	Opponents	Venue	Result	Scorers	Attendance	Notes
14 July 2009	Oxford City	Away	1–2	Midson	1,710	
19 July 2009	Morton	Away	3–0	Midson, Deering, Constable	N/A	
21 July 2009	Rangers	Away	0–2		N/A	
24 July 2009	QPR	Home	2–2	M. Green, Midson	N/A	
1 August 2009	Peterborough United	Home	0–3		N/A	
4 August 2009	Aston Villa XI	Home	2–0	Potter (2)	N/A	
6 October 2009	Watford	Home	1–0	Cook	N/A	
3 November 2009	Leicester City	Away	4–0	Deering, Chapman, Potter, Constable	N/A	

=== Conference Premier ===
Oxford United's home games are played at the Kassam Stadium.

==== Results summary ====
Overall								Home						Away					
Pld	W	D	L	GF	GA	GD	Pts	W	D	L	GF	GA	GD	W	D	L	GF	GA	GD
44	25	11	8	64	31	+33	86	16	4	2	37	10	+27	9	7	6	27	21	+6

Last updated: 24 April 2010.
Source: Football Conference

Chester City F.C. were expelled from the league on 26 February 2010. Oxford, by this time, had already played Chester once. This match, which Oxford won 4–0 at home, was expunged from the records on 8 March 2010.

==== Results by round ====
Round	1	2	3	4	5	6	7	8	9	10	11	12	13	14	15	16	17	18	19	20	21	22	23	24	25	26	27	28	29	30	31	32	33	34	35	36	37	38	39	40	41	42	43	44	45
Ground	H	A	A	H	H	A	H	A	H	A	H	A	A	H	A	H	A	H	A	H	A	A	H	A	H	A	H	A	H	H	H	A	H	H	A	A	H	A	A	H	A	H	H	H	A
Result	W	D	W	W	W	W	D	W	W	W	W	L	W	W	D	W	D	W	L	W	W	W	W	D	L	W	D	L	W	W	W	D	L	D	D	D	W	L	L	W	W	D	W	W	L
Position	7	6	3	1	1	1	1	1	1	1	1	1	1	1	1	1	1	1	1	1	1	1	1	1	2	2	1	2	1	1	1	1	2	2	3	2	2	3	3	3	3	3	3	3	3

Updated to match(es) played on 24 April 2010. Source: see below
A = Away; H = Home; W = Win; D = Draw; L = Loss
Notes: Chester City F.C. were expelled from the league on 26 February 2010 and their results were expunged on 8 March. This meant that the league was 44 games long. Oxford United had already played Chester once in the season (match 4), a game which they had won 4–0

Game	Date	Opponents	Venue	Result	Scorers	Attendance	Notes
1	8 August 2009	York City	Home	2–1	M. Green, Creighton	6,403	Match Report
2	11 August 2009	Kettering Town	Away	1–1	Sandwith	2,240	Match Report
3	15 August 2009	Histon	Away	4–3	M. Green, Clist, Constable (2)	1,433	Match Report
4*	18 August 2009	Chester City	Home	4–0	M. Green, Constable (3)	5,135	Match Report
5	22 August 2009	Stevenage Borough	Home	2–1	Potter, Murray	5,775	Match Report
6	29 August 2009	AFC Wimbledon	Away	1–0	Conroy (o.g.)	4,304	Match Report
7	31 August 2009	Forest Green	Home	0–0		6,338	Match Report
8	5 September 2009	Ebbsfleet United	Away	2–0	M. Green, Clist	1,468	Match Report
9	9 September 2009	Luton Town	Home	2–0	Constable, Cook	10,613	Match Report
10	12 September 2009	Wrexham	Away	1–0	Constable	3,628	Match Report
11	19 September 2009	Eastbourne Borough	Home	4–0	M. Green, Constable, Cook, Midson	5,688	Match Report
12	22 September 2009	Mansfield Town	Away	1–2	Constable	3,933	Match Report
13	26 September 2009	Gateshead	Away	1–0	M. Green	1,144	Match Report
14	29 September 2009	Crawley Town	Home	3–1	Chapman, Kinniburgh, Midson	5,675	Match Report
15	3 October 2009	Barrow	Away	1–1	Foster	1,561	Match Report
16	10 October 2009	Grays Athletic	Home	5–0	Constable (2), Jamie Cook, Midson (2)	6,150	Match Report
17	17 October 2009	York City	Away	1–1	Clist	4,302	Match Report
18	31 October 2009	Altrincham	Home	1–0	Batt	5,609	Match Report
19	14 November 2009	Kidderminster	Away	1–3	Constable	3,569	Match Report
20	21 November 2009	Barrow	Home	1–0	Constable	5,629	Match Report
21	24 November 2009	Forest Green	Away	1–0	Constable	1,610	Match Report
22	1 December 2009	Crawley Town	Away	2–1	Constable, Chapman	1,319	Match Report
23	5 December 2009	Ebbsfleet	Home	4–2	Potter (2), Constable (2)	5,188	Match Report
24	28 December 2009	Salisbury City	Away	1–1	Sodje	2,677	Match Report
25	16 January 2010	Tamworth	Home	0–1		5,690	Match Report
26	23 January 2010	Grays Athletic	Away	4–0	Clist, Potter, Constable, M. Green	1,136	Match Report
27	6 February 2010	Kidderminster	Home	0–0		5,802	Match Report
28	9 February 2010	Luton Town	Away	1–2	M. Green	8,860	Match Report
29	13 February 2010	Histon	Home	2–0	Deering, F. Green	5,365	Match Report
30	16 February 2010	Rushden & Diamonds	Home	1–0	Chapman	7,625	Match Report
31	23 February 2010	AFC Wimbledon	Home	2–0	Constable (2)	6,250	Match Report
32	2 March 2010	Cambridge United	Away	1–1	M. Green	3,002	Match Report
33	9 March 2010	Hayes & Yeading	Home	1–2	Clist	5,045	Match Report
34	13 March 2010	Kettering Town	Home	1–1	F. Green	5,836	Match Report
35	21 March 2010	Tamworth	Away	0–0		1,572	Match Report
36	24 March 2010	Rushden & Diamonds	Away	1–1	Deering	2,970	Match Report
37	27 March 2010	Gateshead	Home	2–1	Constable, M. Green	5,986	Match Report
38	30 March 2010	Stevenage Borough	Away	0–1		5,744	Match Report
39	2 April 2010	Hayes & Yeading	Away	1–2	Constable	1,655	Match Report
40	5 April 2010	Salisbury City	Home	1–0	Potter	5,741	Match Report
41	10 April 2010	Altrincham	Away	0–1	Constable	1,356	Match Report
42	13 April 2010	Cambridge United	Home	0–0		5,219	Match Report
43	17 April 2010	Mansfield Town	Home	2–0	Constable (2)	5,712	Match Report
44	20 April 2010	Wrexham	Home	1–0	Sandwith	4,745	Match Report
45	24 April 2010	Eastbourne Borough	Away	0–1		2,634	Match Report

^{*}Chester City F.C. were expelled from the league on 26 February 2010 and their results were expunged from the record on 8 March. Oxford, by this time, had already played Chester once. The match result and details remain here, though they did not count towards Oxford's final league position

==== Play-offs ====
The first leg of the play-offs took place on 29 April, when Oxford took on Rushden & Diamonds at Nene Park and drew 1–1. Oxford played Rushden at home on 3 May and won 2–0. This meant that Oxford went through to the play-off final against York on 16 May, when they won 3–1. As a result, Oxford were promoted back to the Football League for the first time since 2006.

Semifinals
2	Luton Town	0	0	0
5	York City	1	1	2
3	Oxford United	1	2	3
4	Rushden & Diamonds	1	0	1

Final at Wembley
5	York City	1
3	Oxford United	3

=== League table ===
Pos	Team	Pld	W	D	L	GF	GA	GD	Pts	Promotion, qualification or relegation
1	Stevenage Borough (C, P)	44	30	9	5	79	24	+55	99	Promotion to Football League Two
2	Luton Town	44	26	10	8	84	40	+44	88	Qualification for the Conference Premier play-offs
3	Oxford United (O, P)	44	25	11	8	64	31	+33	86	Qualification for the Conference Premier play-offs
4	Rushden & Diamonds	44	22	13	9	77	39	+38	79	Qualification for the Conference Premier play-offs
5	York City	44	22	12	10	62	35	+27	78	Qualification for the Conference Premier play-offs

Source: Football Conference
Rules for classification: 1) points; 2) goal difference; 3) number of goals scored.
(C) Champions; (O) Play-off winners; (P) Promoted

=== FA Cup ===
The draw for the fourth qualifying round took place on 12 October, pitting Oxford United against promotion chasing Thurrock from the Conference South. A 2–0 win put United through to the first round proper, where they beat Yeovil Town 1–0. Oxford were eliminated in the second round replay by Barrow, thus missing out on the chance to play Sunderland in the third round.

Round	Date	Opponents	Venue	Result	Scorers	Attendance	Notes
4th Q	24 October 2009	Thurrock	Home	2–0	Creighton, Clist	3,296	Match Report
1st	7 November 2009	Yeovil Town	Home	1–0	Midson	6,144	Match Report
2nd	28 November 2009	Barrow	Home	1–1	Cook	6,082	Match Report
2nd R	8 December 2009	Barrow	Away	1–3	Constable	2,754	Match Report

=== FA Trophy ===
The draw for the first round took place on 23 November 2009 and the first round took place on 12 December. Oxford progressed by beating Hayes & Yeading United 1–0. The second round was expected to take place on 9 January, but was postponed twice due to bad weather, the match eventually being played on 19 January. Oxford advanced by beating Woking 1–0. In the third round they beat Chelmsford City 3–1 and faced Kidderminster at home in the fourth round, a game which Oxford lost 2–1.

Round	Date	Opponents	Venue	Result	Scorers	Attendance	Notes
1st	12 December 2009	Hayes & Yeading United	Home	1–0	Midson	1,663	Match Report
2nd	19 January 2010	Woking	Home	1–0	M. Green	1,581	Match Report
3rd	30 January 2010	Chelmsford City	Away	3–1	F. Green, Midson (2)	1,347	Match Report
4th	20 February 2010	Kidderminster Harriers	Home	1–2	M. Green	3,358	Match Report

=== Conference League Cup ===
Due to sponsor Setanta's GB division entering bankruptcy the Conference League Cup was not contested during the 2009–10 season.

=== Oxfordshire Senior Cup ===
The quarter-final took place on 27 January. Oxford drew Kidlington F.C. away and won 2–3 after extra time. They subsequently faced Oxford City in the semi-final and won 2–1, progressing to the final which they won 3–1.

Round	Date	Opponents	Venue	Result	Scorers	Attendance	Notes
QF	27 January 2010	Kidlington F.C.	Away	3–2 (aet)	Cook, F. Green (2)		Match Report
SF	3 March 2010	Oxford City	Away	2–1	Cook, Cain	261	Match Report
F	8 April 2010	Banbury United	Home	3–1	M. Green (3)	650	Match Report

== Player details ==
As of 24 April 2010. (Does not include Oxfordshire County Cup matches or friendlies)

No.	Pos.	Name	League		FA Cup		FA Trophy		CL Cup		Total		Discipline	
No.	Pos.	Name	Apps	Goals	Apps	Goals	Apps	Goals	Apps	Goals	Apps	Goals	Yellow card	Red card
1	GK	Billy Turley	1 (1)	0	0	0	2	0	0	0	3 (1)	0	0	0
2	DF	Damian Batt	31 (6)	1	2 (1)	0	2	0	0	0	35 (7)	1	10	1
3	DF	Kevin Sandwith	16 (5)	2	0	0	4	0	0	0	20 (5)	2	1	0
4	MF	Dannie Bulman	41 (1)	0	4	0	3	0	0	0	48 (1)	0	4	0
5	DF	Luke Foster	20 (1)	1	4	0	1	0	0	0	25 (1)	1	3	1
5	MF	Chris Hargreaves	9 (1)	0	0	0	0 (1)	0	0	0	9 (2)	0	0	0
6	DF	Mark Creighton	31 (3)	1	4	1	1 (2)	0	0	0	36 (5)	2	6	0
7	MF	Adam Chapman	21 (16)	3	3	0	2	0	0	0	26 (16)	3	2	0
8	MF	Adam Murray	21	1	3	0	1	0	0	0	25	1	4	0
9	FW	James Constable	35 (2)	22	2	1	2	0	0	0	39 (2)	23	11	0
10	FW	Jack Midson	18 (17)	4	3 (1)	1	2 (1)	3	0	0	23 (19)	8	3	0
11	MF	Simon Clist	41	5	4	1	4	0	0	0	49	6	2	0
14	MF	Marcus Kelly	2 (1)	0	0	0	0	0	0	0	2 (1)	0	0	0
14	DF	Jake Wright	20	0	0	0	3	0	0	0	23	0	6	0
15	MF	Alfie Potter	12 (10)	5	2	0	3	0	0	0	17 (10)	5	3	0
16	DF	Rhys Day	15 (3)	0	0	0	3	0	0	0	18 (3)	0	0	0
17	DF	Ross Perry	2 (4)	0	0 (1)	0	0	0	0	0	2 (5)	0	0	0
17	MF	Lewis Chalmers	6 (2)	0	0	0	0	0	0	0	6 (2)	0	2	0
18	FW	Alex Rhodes	0 (3)	0	0	0	0	0	0	0	0 (3)	0	0	0
18	FW	Onome Sodje	1 (3)	1	0	0	1	0	0	0	2 (3)	1	0	0
18	DF	Anthony Tonkin	17	0	0	0	0	0	0	0	17	0	0	1
19	DF	Shane Killock	0	0	0	0	0	0	0	0	0	0	0	0
19	FW	Francis Green	10 (4)	1	0	0	3	1	0	0	13 (4)	2	1	0
20	MF	Sam Deering	15 (8)	2	(2)	0	1 (3)	0	0	0	16 (13)	2	1	0
21	GK	Ryan Clarke	43	0	4	0	3	0	0	0	50	0	0	0
22	DF	Steven Kinniburgh	12	1	2	0	0	0	0	0	14	1	1	2
22	MF	Ashley Cain	(1)	0	0	0	(1)	0	0	0	(2)	0	0	0
23	DF	Chris Carruthers	1	0	0	0	0	0	0	0	1	0	0	0
23	FW	John Grant	4 (4)	0	0	0	0	0	0	0	4 (4)	0	0	0
24	FW	Matt Green	24 (14)	10	1 (1)	0	3 (1)	2	0	0	28 (16)	12	10	1
25	FW	Jamie Cook	14 (2)	3	3 (1)	1	1	0	0	0	18 (3)	4	2	0
26	FW	Aaron Woodley	0 (3)	0	0	0	0	0	0	0	0 (3)	0	0	0
27	DF	Richard Groves	0 (1)	0	0 (1)	0	0	0	0	0	0 (2)	0	0	0
28	DF	Ian Sampson	0	0	0	0	0	0	0	0	0	0	0	0

=== Starting 11 ===
Most used team of 2009–10 Football Conference season.

Pos.	Name	Starts
GK	Ryan Clarke	43
RB	Damian Batt	31
CB	Luke Foster	20
CB	Mark Creighton	31
LB	Anthony Tonkin	17
CM	Adam Chapman	21
CM	Dannie Bulman	41
CM	Simon Clist	41
ST	Jack Midson	18
ST	James Constable	35
ST	Matt Green	24

== Transfers ==
=== In ===
Date	Player	From	Fee	Notes
23 July 2009	Rhys Day	Aldershot Town	Free	
31 August 2009	Jamie Cook	Crawley Town	Undisc	
30 December 2009	Lee Fowler	Unattached	Free	
4 January 2010	Francis Green	Kettering Town	Undisc	
5 January 2010	Anthony Tonkin	Cambridge United	Undisc	
29 January 2010	Chris Hargreaves	Torquay United	Free	
20 May 2010	Asa Hall	Unattached	Free	
21 May 2010	Alfie Potter	Peterborough United	Undisc	
21 May 2010	Ben Purkiss	York City	Undisc	
24 May 2010	Steven Kinniburgh	Unattached	Free	
2 June 2010	Matt Green	Torquay United	Undisc	
4 June 2010	Simon Eastwood	Huddersfield Town	Free	
9 June 2010	Simon Heslop	Unattached	Free	
14 June 2010	Mitchell Cole	Stevenage Borough	Undisc	
30 June 2010	Jake Wright	Brighton & Hove Albion	Free	

=== Out ===
Date	Player	To	Fee	Notes
9 July 2009	Joe Burnell	Exeter City	Free	
3 November 2009	Shane Killock	Telford United	Free	
3 November 2009	Alex Rhodes	Released	Free	
1 January 2010	Chris Carruthers	York	Free	
1 January 2010	Marcus Kelly	Kettering Town	Free	
20 January 2010	Luke Foster	Mansfield Town	Undisc	
8 March 2010	Lee Fowler	Released	Free	
20 May 2010	Billy Turley	Released	Free	
20 May 2010	Kevin Sandwith	Released	Free	
20 May 2010	Chris Hargreaves	Released	Free	
20 May 2010	Francis Green	Released	Free	
30 June 2010	Jamie Cook	Crawley Town	Free	

=== Loans in ===
Date	Player	From	End date	Notes
3 July 2009	Alfie Potter	Peterborough United	30 June 2010	
28 August 2009	Ross Perry	Rangers	1 January 2010	
28 August 2009	Steven Kinniburgh	Rangers	1 January 2010	
23 November 2009	Onome Sodje	Barnsley	1 January 2010	
24 November 2009	Francis Green	Kettering Town	N/A	
31 December 2009	Jake Wright	Brighton and Hove Albion	30 June 2010	
19 February 2010	Ashley Cain	Coventry City	19 March 2010	
23 February 2010	John Grant	Aldershot Town	30 June 2010	

=== Loans out ===
Date	Player	To	End date	Notes
28 August 2009	Chris Carruthers	York City	1 January 2010	
10 September 2009	Sam Deering	Newport County	10 October 2009	
28 September 2009	Shane Killock	A.F.C. Telford United	28 October 2009	
24 November 2009	Marcus Kelly	Kettering Town	1 January 2010	
19 February 2010	Richard Groves	Tiverton Town	19 March 2010	

== See also ==
- 2009–10 in English football
- 2009–10 Football Conference
