= 2010 Conference Premier play-off final =

Oxford United	York City
3	1
- Date: 16 May 2010
- Venue: Wembley Stadium, London
- Referee: Michael Naylor
- Attendance: 42,669

The 2010 Conference Premier play-off final, known as the 2010 Blue Square Premier play-off final for sponsorship purposes, was a football match between Oxford United and York City on 16 May 2010 at Wembley Stadium in London. It was the eighth Conference Premier play-off final and the fourth to be played at Wembley Stadium. The 2010 Final set a new Conference Premier play-off final attendance record of 42,669 (158 more than the existing record set by Cambridge United and Exeter City two seasons before) with ticket sales suggesting Oxford brought over 33,000 of these.

Oxford won the match 3–1 to secure promotion to League Two, thus returning to the Football League after a four-year absence.

== Match ==
=== Details ===
16 May 2010
17:00 BST

Oxford United	3–1	York City
Green 15'; Constable 20'; Potter 90'	Report	Clarke 42' (o.g.)

Wembley Stadium, London
Attendance: 42,669
Referee: Michael Naylor

Oxford United	York City

GK	21	Ryan Clarke
RB	2	Damian Batt
CB	6	Mark Creighton
CB	14	Jake Wright
LB	18	Anthony Tonkin
RM	4	Dannie Bulman
CM	7	Adam Chapman (Man of the Match)	(substituted off) 87'
LM	11	Simon Clist
FW	10	Jack Midson	(substituted off) 79'
FW	9	James Constable (c)
FW	24	Matt Green	(substituted off) 68'
Substitutes:
GK	1	Billy Turley
DF	3	Kevin Sandwith
MF	15	Alfie Potter	(substituted in) 68'
DF	16	Rhys Day	(substituted in) 87'
MF	20	Sam Deering	(substituted in) 79'
Manager:
Chris Wilder

GK	24	Michael Ingham (c)
RB	2	Ben Purkiss
CB	5	David McGurk
CB	26	Luke Graham
LB	3	James Meredith
RM	12	Alex Lawless	Booked
CM	14	Neil Barrett		(substituted off) 81'
CM	17	Levi Mackin
LM	23	Chris Carruthers		(substituted off) 73'
FW	16	Richard Brodie
FW	15	Michael Rankine		(substituted off) 70'
Substitutes:
GK	13	Josh Mimms
FW	9	Michael Gash		(substituted in) 70'
DF	6	Daniel Parslow
DF	21	Djoumin Sangaré		(substituted in) 81'
MF	28	Courtney Pitt		(substituted in) 73'
Manager:
Martin Foyle
