= 2010–11 Oxford United F.C. season =

English football club season

Oxford United
2010–11 season
- Chairman: Kelvin Thomas
- Manager: Chris Wilder
- Stadium: Kassam Stadium
- League Two: 12th
- FA Cup: First round
- League Cup: Second round
- Football League Trophy: First round
- Top goalscorer: League: James Constable, Tom Craddock (15); All: James Constable (17)
- Highest home attendance: 9,440 (v Macclesfield Town 28 December 2010 (Football League Two))
- Lowest home attendance: 5,008 (v Bristol Rovers 10 August 2010 (Football League Cup))

Oxford United F.C. season 2010–11 marked the club's return to League Two after a four-year absence. Oxford United finished 12th in the division, having achieved promotion from the Football Conference via the playoffs the previous season. It was the club's 117th year in existence, their 111th of competitive football and their 62nd since turning professional. This article covers the period from 1 July 2010 to 30 June 2011.

United's first season back in the League began with a 1–1 draw at Burton Albion, and their first League win came in their 5th game, a 4–0 defeat of Morecambe. However, this convincing victory was one of only 4 wins in their initial 17 matches, and the team had dropped to 21st in the table by late November. A turnaround in fortunes saw them win 9 of the next 15 games, more-or-less guaranteeing safety from relegation and prompting hopes of a playoff place. However, a return to early-season form from the end of February onwards resulted in a mid-table position at the end of the season.

Oxford were eliminated from the FA Cup by fellow League Two side Burton Albion, but achieved an eye-catching 6–1 victory over Bristol Rovers of League One in the first round of the League Cup, before bowing out to a late goal that gave Premier League outfit West Ham a narrow home victory in the second round. They won the Oxfordshire Senior Cup for the third year running. James Constable was the club's leading scorer, also for the third season running, with 17 goals (which was to be his highest tally for Oxford outside the Football Conference).

== Team kit ==
This season's team kit supplier was the American brand Nike, via JustSport, this season being the second in a three-year deal. The club's main sponsor for the 2010–11 season was Bridle Insurance, an Oxfordshire-based insurance company who replaced Buildbase, who had sponsored Oxford United for a decade.

Home colours	Away colours	Home goalkeeper

== Match fixtures & results ==
=== Legend ===
Win	Draw	Loss

=== Friendlies ===
Date	Opponents	Venue	Result	Scorers	Attendance	Notes
13 July 2010	Didcot Town	Away	6–2	Green, Owen, Crockford, Cole (2), Constable		
17 July 2010	Dumbarton F.C.	Away	0–2	Potter, Deering		
20 July 2010	Livingstone F.C.	Away	0–0			
24 July 2010	Leicester City	Home	1–1	Constable	2,770	
26 July 2010	Brackley Town	Away	1–0			
27 July 2010	Manchester United XI	Home	2–1	Constable	6,082	
30 July 2010	Oxford City	Away	1–0		1,010	
2 August 2010	Banbury United	Away	3–0	Deering, Philliskirk, Cole	369	
18 January 2011	Thame United	Away	3–1	Green, Deering, McDonagh	1,382	

=== Football League Two ===
For information on this season's Football League Two, see 2010–11 Football League Two. Oxford United's home games are played at the Kassam Stadium.

==== Results summary ====
Overall								Home						Away					
Pld	W	D	L	GF	GA	GD	Pts	W	D	L	GF	GA	GD	W	D	L	GF	GA	GD
46	17	12	17	58	60	−2	63	11	4	8	32	25	+7	6	8	9	26	35	−9

Last updated: 8 May 2011.
Source: BBC Sport

==== Results by round ====
Round	1	2	3	4	5	6	7	8	9	10	11	12	13	14	15	16	17	18	19	20	21	22	23	24	25	26	27	28	29	30	31	32	33	34	35	36	37	38	39	40	41	42	43	44	45	46
Ground	A	H	A	H	H	A	H	A	A	H	H	A	H	A	H	A	H	A	H	H	H	A	A	H	A	H	H	A	A	H	A	A	H	A	A	A	H	H	H	A	H	A	H	A	H	A
Result	D	L	D	D	W	W	L	D	D	W	L	L	W	L	L	L	L	W	W	W	L	W	W	W	L	W	D	L	D	W	D	W	L	L	L	W	L	W	W	L	D	D	D	D	W	L
Position	17	19	18	18	13	7	10	9	12	9	11	14	11	14	15	18	21	18	12	11	13	12	10	9	10	7	9	10	9	8	8	8	9	9	10	9	11	10	10	11	11	11	13	12	11	12

Updated to match(es) played on 8 May 2011. Source: see below
A = Away; H = Home; W = Win; D = Draw; L = Loss

Game	Date	Opponents	Venue	Result	Scorers	Attendance	Notes
1	7 August 2010	Burton Albion	Away	0–0		4,321	
2	14 August 2010	Bury	Home	1–2	Midson	7,552	
3	21 August 2010	Wycombe Wanderers	Away	0–0		6,983	
4	28 August 2010	Accrington Stanley	Home	0–0		6,428	
5	4 September 2010	Morecambe	Home	4–0	Heslop, Constable (3)	6,237	
6	11 September 2010	Hereford United	Away	0–2	Constable, Craddock	2,980	
7	18 September 2010	Stockport County	Home	0–1		7,033	
8	25 September 2010	Crewe Alexandra	Away	1–1	Constable	4,584	
9	28 September 2010	Cheltenham Town	Away	1–1	Midson	4,349	
10	2 October 2010	Port Vale	Home	2–1	Craddock, Green	7,947	
11	9 October 2010	Aldershot Town	Home	0–1		7,808	
12	16 October 2010	Macclesfield Town	Away	3–2	Constable, Craddock	1,395	
13	23 October 2010	Northampton Town	Home	3–1	Potter, Payne, Craddock (pen)	7,647	
14	30 October 2010	Bradford City	Away	5–0		11,376	
15	2 November 2010	Torquay United	Home	0–2		6,401	
16	13 November 2010	Rotherham United	Away	2–1	Clist	3,891	
17	20 November 2010	Gillingham	Home	0–1		7,144	
18	23 November 2010	Chesterfield	Away	1–2	Craddock, MacLean	5,929	
19	4 December 2010	Barnet	Home	2–1	Uddin (og), Constable	6,004	
20	28 December 2010	Macclesfield Town	Home	2–1	Heslop, Constable	9,440	
21	1 January 2011	Southend United	Home	0–2		7,362	
22	3 January 2011	Torquay United	Away	3–4	Craddock, Midson (3)	3,021	
23	8 January 2011	Aldershot Town	Away	1–2	Charles (og), Craddock	3,129	
24	15 January 2011	Bradford City	Home	2–1	MacLean, Craddock	7,068	
25	22 January 2011	Northampton Town	Away	2–1	Craddock	6,097	
26	25 January 2011	Shrewsbury Town	Home	3–1	Hall, Constable (2)	6,264	
27	29 January 2011	Cheltenham Town	Home	1–1	Craddock	7,738	
28	1 February 2011	Southend United	Away	2–1	Constable	4,944	
29	5 February 2011	Gillingham	Away	0–0		5,364	
30	12 February 2011	Rotherham United	Home	2–1	Heslop, MacLean	6,615	
31	15 February 2011	Stevenage	Away	0–0		2,590	
32	19 February 2011	Morecambe	Away	0–3	Hall (2), McLaren	2,171	
33	26 February 2011	Hereford United	Home	0–2		7,807	
34	1 March 2011	Lincoln City	Away	3–1	MacLean	2,261	
35	5 March 2011	Stockport County	Away	2–1	Craddock	4,119	
36	12 March 2011	Port Vale	Away	1–2	Midson, Worley	5,661	
37	15 March 2011	Stevenage	Home	1–2	Craddock (pen)	6,018	
38	19 March 2011	Crewe Alexandra	Home	2–1	Constable (2)	6,751	
39	27 March 2011	Burton Albion	Home	3–0	MacLean (2), Craddock (pen)	7,127	
40	2 April 2011	Bury	Away	3–0		3,515	
41	9 April 2011	Wycombe Wanderers	Home	2–2	Potter, Winfield (og)	9,309	
42	16 April 2011	Accrington Stanley	Away	0–0		2,066	
43	23 April 2011	Chesterfield	Home	0–0		8,195	
44	25 April 2011	Barnet	Away	2–2	Constable (2)	3,425	
45	2 May 2011	Lincoln City	Home	2–1	Hall, Craddock	7,485	
46	8 May 2011	Shrewsbury Town	Away	3–0		8,817	

==== League table ====
Pos	Team	Pld	W	D	L	GF	GA	GD	Pts
10	Crewe Alexandra	46	18	11	17	87	65	+22	65
11	Port Vale	46	17	14	15	54	49	+5	65
12	Oxford United	46	17	12	17	58	60	−2	63
13	Southend United	46	16	13	17	62	56	+6	61
14	Aldershot Town	46	14	19	13	54	54	0	61

Updated to match(es) played on 28 May 2011. Source: The Football League
Rules for classification: 1) points; 2) goal difference; 3) number of goals scored.

=== FA Cup ===
Round	Date	Opponents	Venue	Result	Scorers	Attendance	Notes
1st	7 November 2010	Burton Albion	Away	1–0		2,483	

=== League Cup ===
Round	Date	Opponents	Venue	Result	Scorers	Attendance	Notes
1st	10 August 2010	Bristol Rovers	Home	6–1	Heslop (2), Green, Constable (2), Midson	5,008	
2nd	24 August 2010	West Ham United	Away	1–0		20,902	

=== Football League Trophy ===
Round	Date	Opponents	Venue	Result	Scorers	Attendance	Notes
1st	31 August 2010	Aldershot Town	Away	2–0		1,607	

=== Oxfordshire Senior Cup ===
Round	Date	Opponents	Venue	Result	Scorers	Attendance	Notes
QF	2 March 2011	North Leigh	ASM Stadium, Thame	9–3	Sangaré, Clist, Potter, Midson (3), West, Hackney (2)	212	
SF	29 March 2011	Banbury United	ASM Stadium, Thame	2–0	Potter, Hackney		
Final	12 April 2011	Kidlington	Kassam Stadium	4–0	Hanson, Burge, Heslop, Potter	1200	

== Player details ==
As of 9 May 2011 (does not include Oxfordshire Senior Cup matches or friendlies).

No.	Pos.	Name	League		FA Cup		League Cup		JP Trophy		Total		Discipline	
No.	Pos.	Name	Apps	Goals	Apps	Goals	Apps	Goals	Apps	Goals	Apps	Goals	Yellow card	Red card
1	GK	Ryan Clarke	46	0	1	0	2	0	1	0	50	0	1	0
2	DF	Damian Batt	27 (1)	0	1	0	1	0	0	0	29 (1)	0	1	1
3	DF	Anthony Tonkin	37 (2)	0	1	0	2	0	1	0	41 (2)	0	3	1
4	MF	Dannie Bulman	4 (1)	0	0	0	2	0	(1)	0	6 (1)	0	1	0
4	MF	Paul McLaren	24	1	0	0	0	0	0	0	24	1	5	0
5	DF	Mark Creighton	5 (2)	0	1	0	0	0	1	0	7 (2)	0	4	1
5	DF	Djoumin Sangaré	2 (2)	0	0	0	0	0	0	0	2 (2)	0	0	0
6	DF	Jake Wright	33 (2)	0	0	0	2	0	1	0	36 (2)	0	6	1
8	MF	Simon Heslop	30 (8)	3	0	0	2	2	0	0	32 (8)	5	7	0
9	FW	James Constable	35 (9)	15	0	0	2	2	0	0	37 (9)	17	5	1
10	FW	Jack Midson	11 (10)	6	0	0	1	1	(1)	0	12 (11)	7	1	0
11	MF	Simon Clist	16 (7)	1	(1)	0	(2)	0	1	0	17 (10)	1	1	0
14	MF	Asa Hall	34 (7)	4	(1)	0	2	0	0	0	36 (8)	4	5	0
15	MF	Alfie Potter	16 (22)	2	1	0	1 (1)	0	1	0	19 (23)	2	0	0
16	MF	Simon Hackney	2 (11)	0	0	0	0	0	0	0	2 (11)	0	0	0
17	MF	Mitchell Cole	(4)	0	0	0	1	0	1	0	2 (4)	0	0	0
17	FW	Ryan Doble	1 (2)	0	0	0	0	0	0	0	1 (2)	0	0	0
18	MF	Steven Kinniburgh	10 (1)	0	1	0	0	0	0	0	11 (1)	0	2	0
19	MF	Richie Baker	(6)	0	0	0	1	0	1	0	2 (6)	0	0	0
19	MF	Ryan Burge	5	0	0	0	0	0	0	0	5	0	0	0
20	FW	Sam Deering	(6)	0	(1)	0	(1)	0	(1)	0	(9)	0	0	0
22	DF	Harry Worley	41 (2)	1	1	0	2	0	0	0	44 (2)	1	10	0
23	DF	Ben Purkiss	19 (4)	0	1	0	1	0	1	0	21 (4)	0	1	0
24	FW	Matt Green	9 (8)	1	1	0	1 (1)	1	1	0	12 (9)	2	2	0
26	DF	Leigh Franks	4 (1)	0	0	0	0	0	0	0	4 (1)	0	2	0
27	FW	Danny Philliskirk	(1)	0	0	0	0	0	0	0	(1)	0	0	0
27	MF	Paul Wotton	4	0	0	0	0	0	0	0	4	0	0	0
28	MF	Josh Payne	23 (5)	1	1	0	0	0	1	0	25 (5)	1	7	0
29	FW	Tom Craddock	36 (3)	15	1	0	0	0	0	0	37 (3)	15	6	0
30	DF	Ben Futcher	6	0	0	0	0	0	0	0	6	0	3	0
30	DF	Mitchell Hanson	(2)	0	0	0	0	0	0	0	(2)	0	0	0
32	FW	Steve MacLean	26 (5)	6	0	0	0	0	0	0	26 (5)	6	4	0

== Awards ==
End of Season Awards	Winner
Andrew Knapton Supporters' Player of the Year	James Constable
Oxford Mail Supporters' Man-of-the-Match	Harry Worley
Players' Player of the Year	Ryan Clarke
Young Player of the Year	Harry Worley
Jack FM 'Big Banana' Award	Ryan Clarke
Media Moment of the Year	Tom Craddock (for his winner vs Port Vale, 2 October 2010)
Goal of the Season	Tom Craddock (vs Hereford United, 11 September 2010)

== Transfer ==
=== In ===
Date	Player	From	Fee	Notes
1 July 2010	Richie Baker	Bury	Free	
22 July 2010	Harry Worley	Leicester City	Free	
31 August 2010	Tom Craddock	Luton Town	Undisc	
21 December 2010	Laurence Gaughan	Unattached	Free	
31 December 2010	Paul McLaren	Unattached	Free	
1 January 2011	Josh Payne	Doncaster Rovers	Free	
13 January 2011	Djoumin Sangaré	Unattached	Free	
2 April 2011	Mitchell Hanson	Unattached	Free	

=== Out ===
Date	Player	To	Fee	Notes
5 July 2010	Adam Murray	Luton Town	Free	
1 January 2011	Dannie Bulman	Crawley Town	Free	
4 January 2011	Richie Baker	Barrow	Free	
6 January 2011	Rhys Day	Mansfield Town	Free	
8 January 2011	Mark Creighton	Wrexham	Free	
7 February 2011	Mitchell Cole	Retired	Free	

=== Loan in ===
Date	Player	From	End date	Notes
28 July 2010	Leigh Franks	Huddersfield Town	31 January 2011	
2 August 2010	Danny Philliskirk	Chelsea	27 August 2010	
31 August 2010	Josh Payne	Doncaster Rovers	30 January 2010	
8 November 2010	Paul Wotton	Southampton F.C.	31 December 2010	
11 November 2010	Ben Futcher	Bury F.C.	4 January 2011	
11 November 2010	Steve MacLean	Plymouth Argyle	30 June 2011	
31 January 2011	Simon Hackney	Colchester United	30 June 2011	
17 March 2011	Ryan Burge	Doncaster Rovers	18 April 2011	
22 March 2011	Ryan Doble	Southampton	30 June 2011	

=== Loan out ===
Date	Player	To	End date	Notes
25 September 2010	Dannie Bulman	Crawley Town	31 December 2010	
27 September 2010	Aaron Woodley	Oxford City	27 October 2010	
15 October 2010	Rhys Day	Mansfield Town	6 January 2010	
5 November 2010	Jack Midson	Southend United	28 December 2010	
13 November 2010	Mark Creighton	Wrexham F.C.	4 January 2011	
19 November 2010	Sam Deering	Newport County	4 January 2011	
31 January 2010	Matt Green	Cheltenham Town	30 June 2011	
8 February 2011	Sam Deering	Barnet	30 June 2011	
21 March 2011	Jack Midson	Barnet	30 June 2011	

== See also ==
- 2010–11 in English football
- 2010–11 Football League Two
