= Ryan Clarke (English footballer) =

English footballer (born 1982)

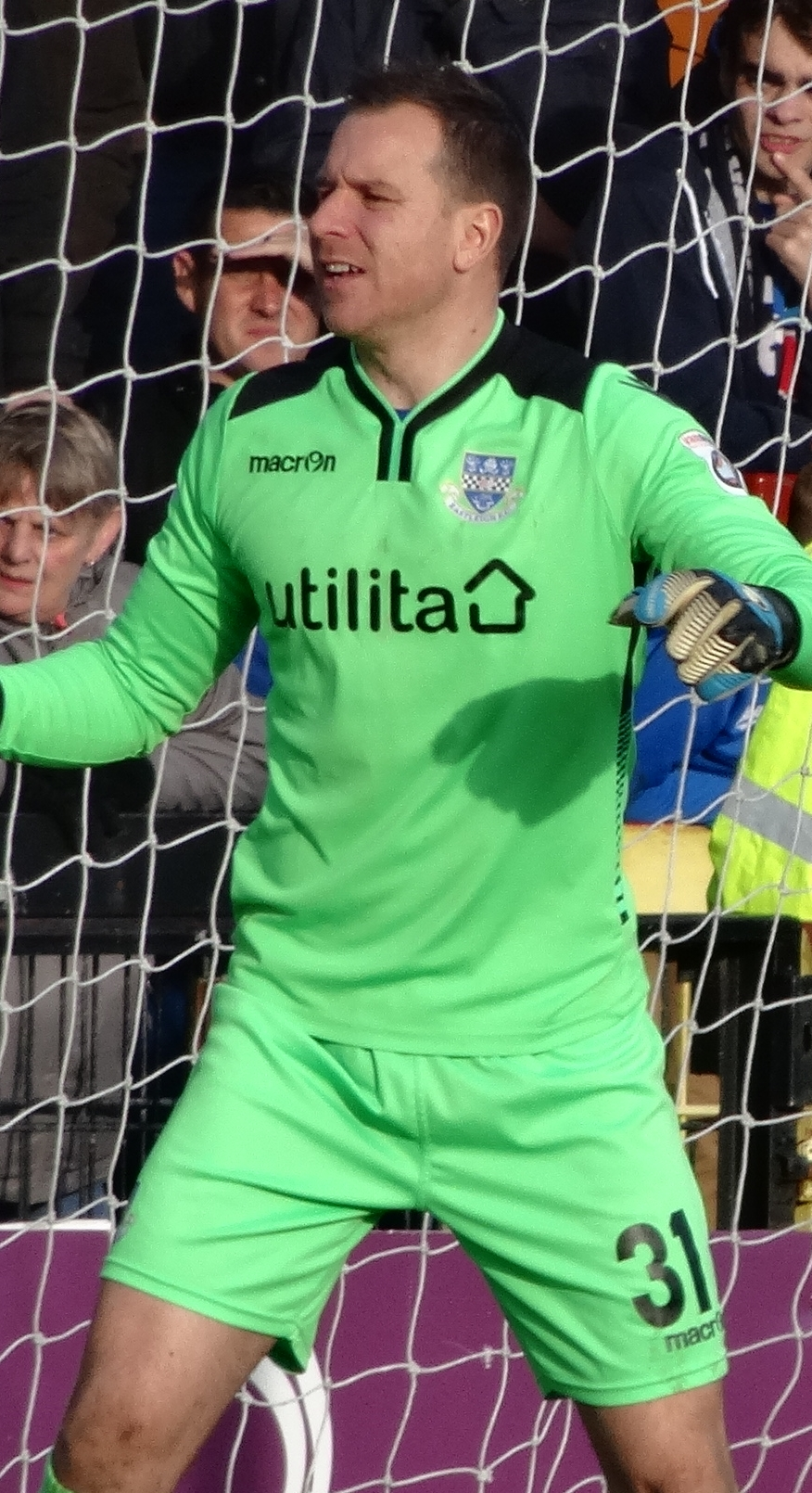
- Clarke playing for Eastleigh in 2017

Personal information
- Full name: Ryan James Clarke
- Date of birth: 30 April 1982 (age 44)
- Place of birth: Bristol, England
- Height: 6 ft 1 in (1.85 m)
- Position: Goalkeeper

Team information
- Current team: Hungerford Town

Youth career
- –2000: Bristol Rovers

Senior career*
Years	Team	Apps	(Gls)
2000–2006	Bristol Rovers	23	(0)
2004	→ Southend United (loan)	1	(0)
2004	→ Kidderminster Harriers (loan)	6	(0)
2005–2006	→ Forest Green Rovers (loan)	42	(0)
2006–2009	Salisbury City	87	(0)
2008–2009	→ Northwich Victoria (loan)	23	(0)
2009–2015	Oxford United	232	(0)
2015–2016	Northampton Town	0	(0)
2016	AFC Wimbledon	7	(0)
2016–2017	Eastleigh	11	(0)
2017–2018	Torquay United	10	(0)
2018–2023	Bath City	121	(0)
2023–2025	Hungerford Town	70	(0)
2025–2026	Corsham Town	38	(0)
2026–	Hungerford Town	0	(0)
- * Club domestic league appearances and goals as of 18:37, 2 June 2026 (UTC)

Ryan James Clarke (born 30 April 1982) is an English professional footballer who plays as a goalkeeper for Southern League Division One South club Hungerford Town. He previously trained with the England under-18 squad in La Manga.

== Career ==
=== Bristol Rovers ===
Born in Bristol, Clarke started his career with Bristol Rovers; during his time on Rovers' books he had spells on loan at Kidderminster Harriers, Southend United and Forest Green Rovers, where he worked with former England wicketkeeper Jack Russell as his goalkeeper coach.

=== Salisbury City ===
Clarke joined Salisbury City from Bristol Rovers in August 2006.

In the summer of 2008, he broke a metatarsal while on holiday. This setback lead to James Bittner claiming the number one shirt from him, and Clarke was then loaned out to Northwich Victoria to reduce the club's wage bill.

=== Oxford United ===
Clarke joined Oxford United on 26 May 2009. He was their regular goalkeeper in the 2009–10 campaign and, despite his scoring an own goal in the 2010 Conference Premier play-off final against York City on 16 May, his Oxford side still secured a return to the Football League after a four-year exile as 3–1 winners. At the end of the season, Clarke was voted Player of the Year by the Oxford supporters for his feats between the posts.

On 12 January 2011, Oxford United announced that Clarke had signed a three-and-a-half-year contract, meaning he would stay at the club until 2014. On 30 January 2014, he signed another three-year deal, keeping him at the club until 2017.

=== Northampton Town ===
Clarke signed for League Two club Northampton Town on a two-year contract on 2 July 2015.

=== AFC Wimbledon and Eastleigh ===
On 21 June 2016, Clarke joined League One newcomers AFC Wimbledon on a one-year contract. On 21 September Clarke moved to Eastleigh on a two-year deal. In April 2017 Clarke's contract with Eastleigh was terminated with mutual consent.

=== Torquay United ===
On 24 June 2017, Clarke signed for National League club Torquay United. He was transfer-listed by Torquay at the end of the 2017–18 season.

=== Hungerford Town ===
In May 2023, he joined recently relegated Southern Premier Division South club Hungerford Town.

He departed the club at the end of the 2024–25 season.

=== Corsham Town ===
In May 2025, Clarke agreed to join Hellenic League Premier Division side Corsham Town.

On 2 June 2026, the club announced his departure.

=== Return to Hungerford Town ===
On 29 June 2026, Clarke returned to Hungerford Town, now playing in the Southern League Division One South.

== Career statistics ==
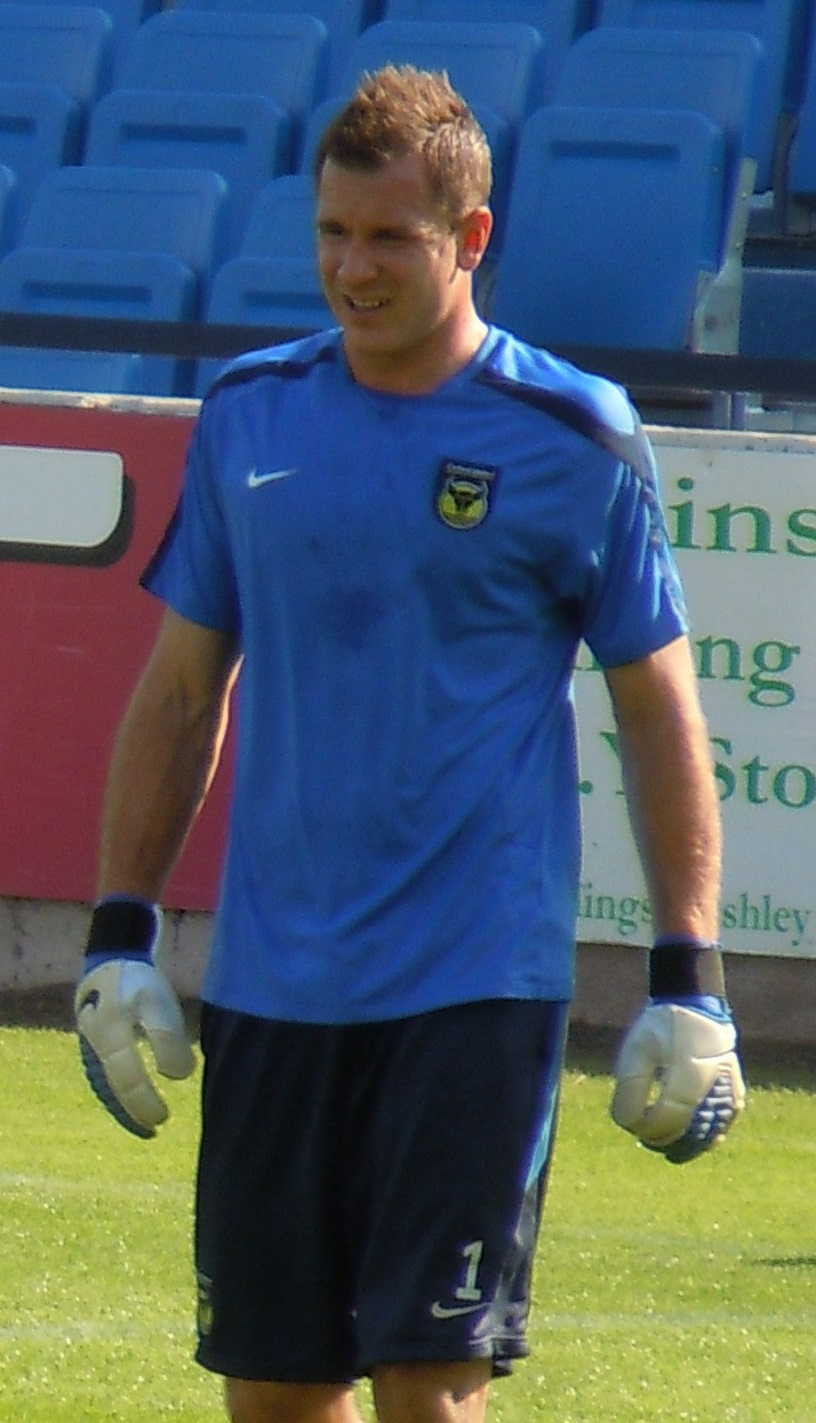
Clarke warming up for Oxford United in 2011

As of end of 2024–25 season

Appearances and goals by club, season and competition
Club	Season	League			FA Cup		League Cup		Other		Total	
Club	Season	Division	Apps	Goals	Apps	Goals	Apps	Goals	Apps	Goals	Apps	Goals
Bristol Rovers	2000–01	Second Division	0	0	0	0	0	0	0	0	0	0
Bristol Rovers	2001–02	Third Division	1	0	0	0	0	0	0	0	1	0
Bristol Rovers	2002–03	Third Division	2	0	0	0	0	0	1 (Note: Appearance(s) in Football League Trophy)	0	3	0
Bristol Rovers	2003–04	Third Division	2	0	0	0	0	0	0	0	2	0
Bristol Rovers	2004–05	League Two	18	0	—		0	0	2	0	20	0
Bristol Rovers	Total		23	0	0	0	0	0	3	0	26	0
Southend United (loan)	2004–05	League Two	1	0	—		—		—		1	0
Kidderminster Harriers (loan)	2004–05	League Two	6	0	1	0	—		—		7	0
Forest Green Rovers (loan)	2005–06	Conference National	42	0	1	0	—		3 (Note: Appearance(s) in FA Trophy)	0	46	0
Salisbury City	2006–07	Conference South	41	0	4	0	—		7 (Note: Four appearances in FA Trophy, three in Conference South play-offs)	0	52	0
Salisbury City	2007–08	Conference Premier	46	0	2	0	—		2 (Note: One appearance in FA Trophy, one in Conference League Cup)	0	50	0
Salisbury City	2008–09	Conference Premier	0	0	0	0	—		0	0	0	0
Salisbury City	Total		87	0	6	0	—		9	0	102	0
Northwich Victoria (loan)	2008–09	Conference Premier	23	0	—		—		1	0	24	0
Oxford United	2009–10	Conference Premier	43	0	4	0	—		5 (Note: Two appearances in FA Trophy, three in Conference Premier play-offs)	0	52	0
Oxford United	2010–11	League Two	46	0	1	0	2	0	1	0	50	0
Oxford United	2011–12	League Two	42	0	1	0	1	0	0	0	44	0
Oxford United	2012–13	League Two	24	0	4	0	2	0	4	0	34	0
Oxford United	2013–14	League Two	46	0	5	0	1	0	1	0	53	0
Oxford United	2014–15	League Two	31	0	3	0	0	0	0	0	34	0
Oxford United	Total		232	0	18	0	6	0	11	0	267	0
Northampton Town	2015–16	League Two	0	0	0	0	2	0	2	0	4	0
AFC Wimbledon	2016–17	League One	7	0	—		1	0	1 (Note: Appearance in EFL Trophy)	0	9	0
Eastleigh	2016–17	National League	11	0	3	0	—		0	0	14	0
Torquay United	2017–18	National League	10	0	0	0	—		1	0	11	0
Bath City	2018–19	National League South	42	0	3	0	—		2 (Note: One appearance in FA Trophy, one appearance in National League South play-offs)	0	47	0
Bath City	2019–20	National League South	29	0	2	0	—		6 (Note: Five appearances in FA Trophy, one appearance in National League South play-offs)	0	37	0
Bath City	2020–21	National League South	11	0	3	0	—		0	0	14	0
Bath City	2021–22	National League South	36	0	1	0	—		5 (Note: One appearance in FA Trophy, four appearances in Somerset Premier Cup)	0	42	0
Bath City	2022–23	National League South	3	0	0	0	—		3	0	6	0
Bath City	Total		121	0	9	0	—		16	0	146	0
Hungerford Town	2023–24	Southern League Premier Division South	35	0	3	0	—		3	0	41	0
Hungerford Town	2024–25	Southern League Premier Division South	35	0	3	0	—		5 (Note: Two appearances in FA Trophy, three appearances in Berks & Bucks Senior Cup)	0	43	0
Hungerford Town	Total		70	0	6	0	0	0	8	0	84	0
Career total			633	0	44	0	9	0	55	0	741	0

== Honours ==
Salisbury City

- Conference South play-offs: 2007

Oxford United

- Conference Premier play-offs: 2010

Individual

- National League South Team of the Year: 2018–19
