= Chris Carruthers =

English footballer (born 1983)

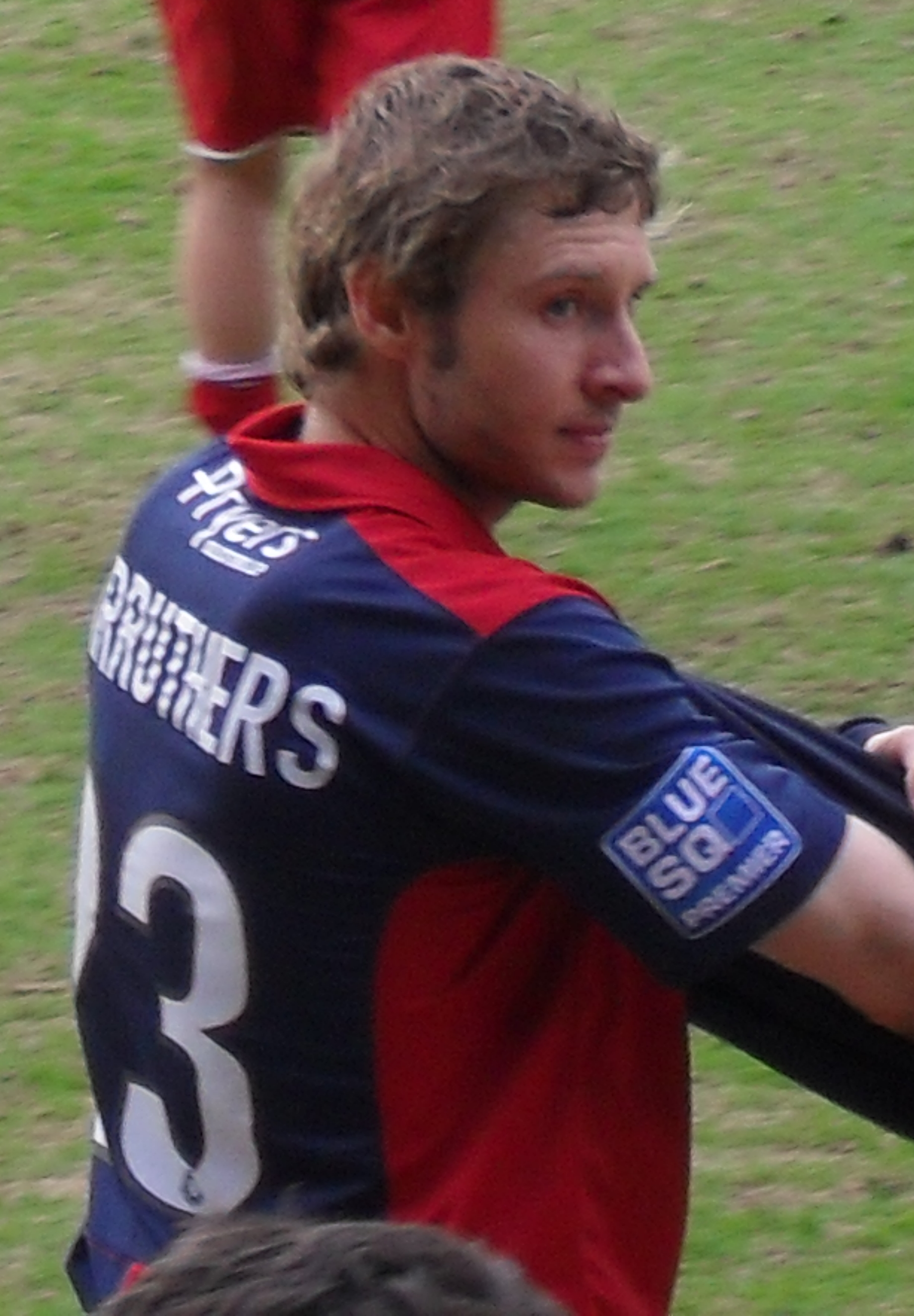
- Carruthers playing for York City in 2010

Personal information
- Full name: Christopher Paul Carruthers
- Date of birth: 19 August 1983 (age 43)
- Place of birth: Kettering, England
- Height: 6 ft 1 in (1.85 m)
- Position: Left-back

Youth career
- –199?: Harborough Town
- 199?–2000: Northampton Town

Senior career*
Years	Team	Apps	(Gls)
2000–2005	Northampton Town	74	(1)
2004	→ Hornchurch (loan)	3	(0)
2005	→ Kettering Town (loan)	2	(0)
2005	→ Bristol Rovers (loan)	5	(0)
2005–2008	Bristol Rovers	95	(1)
2008–2010	Oxford United	36	(0)
2009	→ Crawley Town (loan)	7	(1)
2009–2010	→ York City (loan)	10	(1)
2010–2011	York City	42	(2)
2011–2012	Gateshead	21	(0)
2012–2013	Hereford United	21	(1)
2013–2014	Corby Town	40	(4)
2014–2015	Brackley Town	27	(0)
2015	Corby Town	14	(0)
2015–2016	Kettering Town	27	(0)
Total		424	(11)

International career
2002–2003	England U20	11	(0)
- * Club domestic league appearances and goals

Christopher Paul Carruthers (born 19 August 1983) is an English former professional footballer who played as a left-back. He played in the Football League for Northampton Town and Bristol Rovers.

Carruthers started his career with the Northampton Town youth system and made his first-team debut in 2001. He had loans with Hornchurch, Kettering Town, and Bristol Rovers, joining the latter permanently in 2005 after making over 80 appearances for Northampton. His three seasons with the club included an appearance in the successful 2007 League Two play-off final, which came before his release in 2008. He signed for Conference Premier club Oxford United and after one season was loaned to Crawley Town. He then joined Oxford's divisional rivals York City on loan and signed for them permanently in 2010.

After his release by York, Carruthers joined Conference Premier club Gateshead in 2011. He was released after one season with Gateshead, joining Hereford United before dropping down to the Southern League Premier Division with Corby Town in 2013. He was named the Players' Player of the Year in 2013–14 before joining Brackley Town of the Conference North. He rejoined Corby after their promotion to the National League North in 2015. Later that year, he rejoined Southern League Premier Division club Kettering Town, before leaving in 2016. He also represented the England national under-20 team and played at the 2003 Toulon Tournament and the 2003 FIFA World Youth Championship. He earned 11 caps for the team.

== Early and personal life ==
Christopher Paul Carruthers was born on 19 August 1983 in Kettering, Northamptonshire, and attended Raunds Manor School from 1994 to 1999. He has been the owner of Carruthers Property Services since April 2010 and a director of Players Taxback since September 2012. He has worked in various roles for Travis Perkins since October 2013.

== Club career ==
=== Northampton Town ===
Carruthers played for Raunds Tigers before joining Harborough Town aged 13. He soon joined Northampton Town in their youth system after a two-week trial. He was named in the first-team squad for the 2000–01 season, when Northampton were in the Second Division following their promotion. He made his debut at the age of 17 as a half-time substitute in a 2–0 home defeat to Port Vale on 26 April 2001 and his first start came in a 3–0 home defeat to Walsall on 5 May, finishing the season with three appearances. He signed his first professional contract with the club on 9 April 2002. He scored his first goal for the club with a "spectacular" long-range volley on 84 minutes in a 4–1 win against Wycombe Wanderers. This season, 2001–02, Carruthers was able to make more of an impact, playing in 14 matches and scoring 1 goal. He received the first yellow card of his career in a 2–2 away draw with Cambridge United in the FA Cup second round on 7 December. During 2002–03, he cemented his place in the first team, playing 38 matches.

He played for Northampton in a 3–0 home defeat to Premier League team Manchester United in the FA Cup fourth round on 25 January 2004, in which he conceded a penalty kick after two minutes and then was stretchered off in the second half with a neck injury. He signed a new contract with Northampton in February, which would expire in June 2006. He finished 2003–04 with 31 appearances. However, in 2004–05, Carruthers fell out of favour at Northampton and he was made available to other clubs on loan. He joined Conference South club Hornchurch on 19 November on a one-month loan, and after making his debut in a 2–1 home defeat to Grays Athletic he finished the loan with four appearances. He joined Conference North leaders Kettering Town, his hometown club, on a one-month loan on 21 January 2005. His debut came in a 5–0 home defeat to Southport and made one further appearance, completing the loan with two appearances before returning to Northampton.

=== Bristol Rovers ===
After returning he only managed to play one match before being loaned out again on 24 March 2005, this time to League Two club Bristol Rovers, until the end of the season. He made his debut two days later as a substitute on 79 minutes in a 2–1 victory away to Notts County. He stated his desire to stay at the club long-term in April, saying "I do need a change, just to get myself going again really because it has been disappointing not playing." He made his first start for the club in a 4–0 away defeat against Scunthorpe United on 30 April. The loan expired in May after playing five times and he again expressed his desire to stay at the club. Wycombe Wanderers agreed to sign Carruthers on a two-year contract on a free transfer on 16 June and Rovers manager Ian Atkins revealed his disappointment at not signing him, saying "He was high on my list. There are not many players who can play left-back, wing-back or as out-and-out wingers". However, after speaking to Atkins and being guaranteed regular football, he decided to join Rovers instead on 29 June.

Carruthers scored for the first time in 2005–06 with the winning goal in a 1–0 victory away to Grimsby Town on 10 December 2005 after scoring from a free kick on 80 minutes. He played regularly after signing permanently, appearing in 45 matches and scoring once in his first full season at the club. Ahead of 2006–07, Carruthers said "We've got a good set of players and have proved that – especially away against some of the top sides. We're capable of getting results; we just need to get that consistency". He played in an FA Cup fourth round match against Championship team Derby County on 27 January 2007, in which he cleared a header by Arturo Lupoli off the line, although Rovers lost 1–0. He played in both legs of Rovers' play-off semi-final victory over Lincoln City, which finished 7–4 on aggregate. He played in the 2007 League Two play-off final at Wembley Stadium on 26 May, which Rovers won 3–1 against Shrewsbury Town, thus earning promotion to League One. He finished the season with 54 appearances and agreed a new one-year contract with the club in July.

Carruthers came on as a substitute on 76 minutes in a 2–2 draw away to Premier League team Fulham on 6 January 2008. By February, he had been dislodged at left-back by Joe Jacobson, although he made a return to the team for a 2–0 home victory over Cheltenham Town after Jacobson was unavailable for selection. He made one more appearance before the end of 2007–08, a 1–1 draw at home to Northampton on 12 March, finishing the season with 24 appearances. He was released by the club in May.

=== Oxford United ===
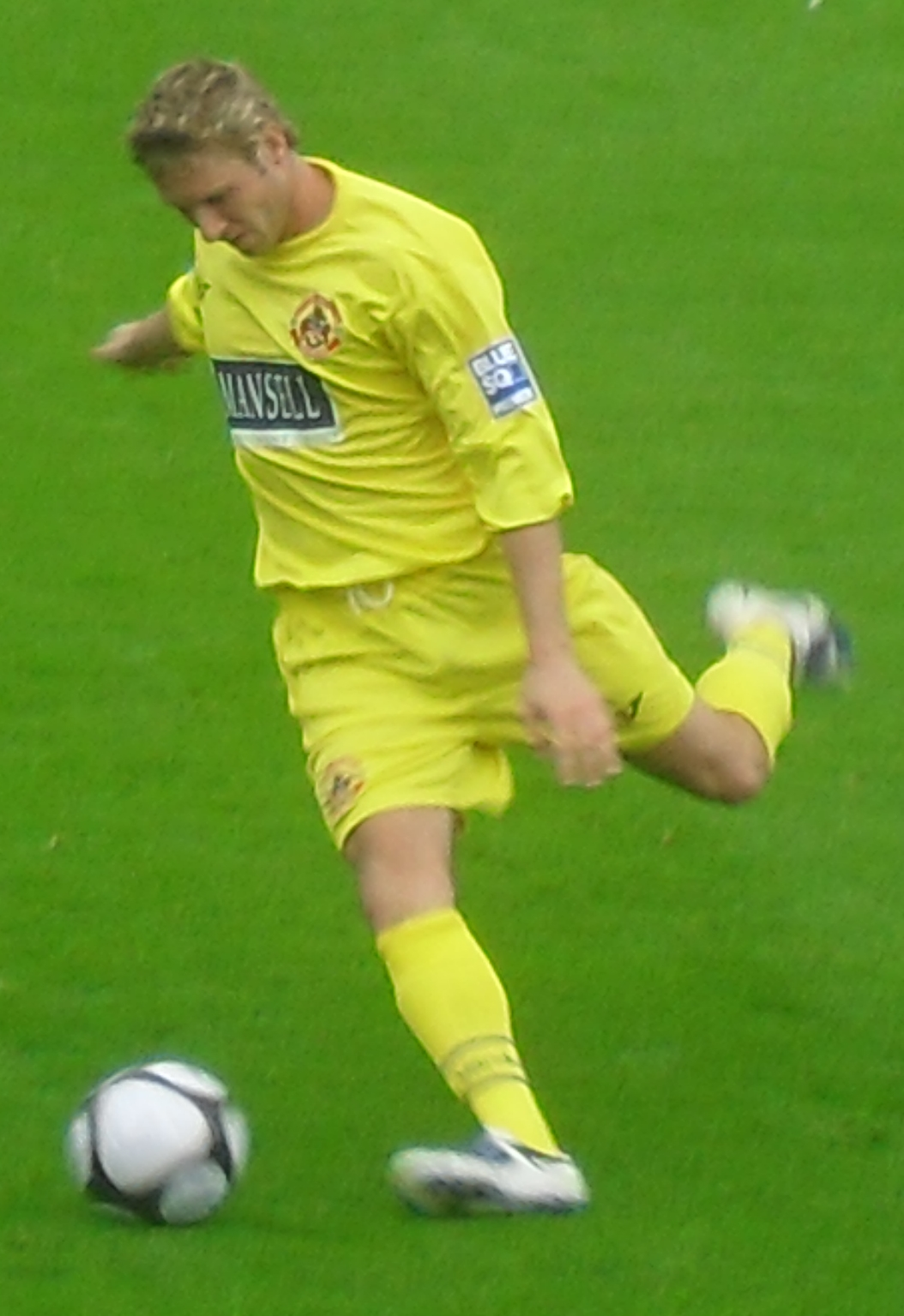
Carruthers playing for Crawley Town in 2009

He signed for Conference Premier club Oxford United on 4 July 2008, with manager Darren Patterson describing him as "another great pro who has bags of experience considering his age". He was placed on the transfer list in September, but was removed less than two weeks later. He finished 2008–09 with 42 appearances. Manager Chris Wilder said in June 2009 that Carruthers was not part of his plans. He joined Oxford's fellow Conference Premier club Crawley Town on 28 August on a one-month loan, having made one appearance for Oxford up to that point in 2009–10. He made his debut as a substitute on 21 minutes in a 1–1 home draw with Grays on 29 August, nearly scoring after 11 minutes of being on the field after forcing a save from goalkeeper Preston Edwards, and this was followed by his first start in a 3–0 defeat away to Luton Town on 1 September. His first goal came with the opener in a 2–0 home victory against Histon on 8 September with an "unstoppable shot into the top right corner". He finished the loan with seven appearances and one goal after it expired on 26 September.

=== York City ===
Carruthers joined Conference Premier club York City on 28 September 2009 on a one-month loan to provide competition for the left-side. He made his debut in a 1–1 home draw with Stevenage Borough on 3 October, after coming on as a 76th-minute substitute. In November, the loan was extended until 2 January 2010. Carruthers scored his first York goal with the opening goal in a 2–1 home victory over Wrexham on 5 December after heading in a cross by Michael Rankine. After the loan spell concluded, he was offered a one-and-a-half-year contract by York and was subsequently released by Oxford. He signed for York permanently on 6 January. He scored in his first match after signing, opening the scoring in a 4–1 home win over Hayes & Yeading United on 16 January, converting from a Richard Brodie cross.

He picked up an ankle injury seven minutes into a 2–1 home defeat to Salisbury City on 9 March 2010, and made his return in a 1–1 home draw with Tamworth on 27 March. He played in both legs of York's play-off semi-final victory over Luton, which finished 2–0 on aggregate, and scored the goal in the 1–0 away win in the second leg with a clipped shot from three yards after goalkeeper Mark Tyler parried Rankine's free kick. Following the match, he was hit by a coin with the York squad being forced to leave the ground through the back of a stand after having missiles thrown at them by a section of Luton fans. He started in the 2010 Conference Premier play-off final at Wembley Stadium on 16 May, being substituted on 74 minutes, as York lost 3–1 to Oxford. He finished the season with 39 appearances and 3 goals for York.

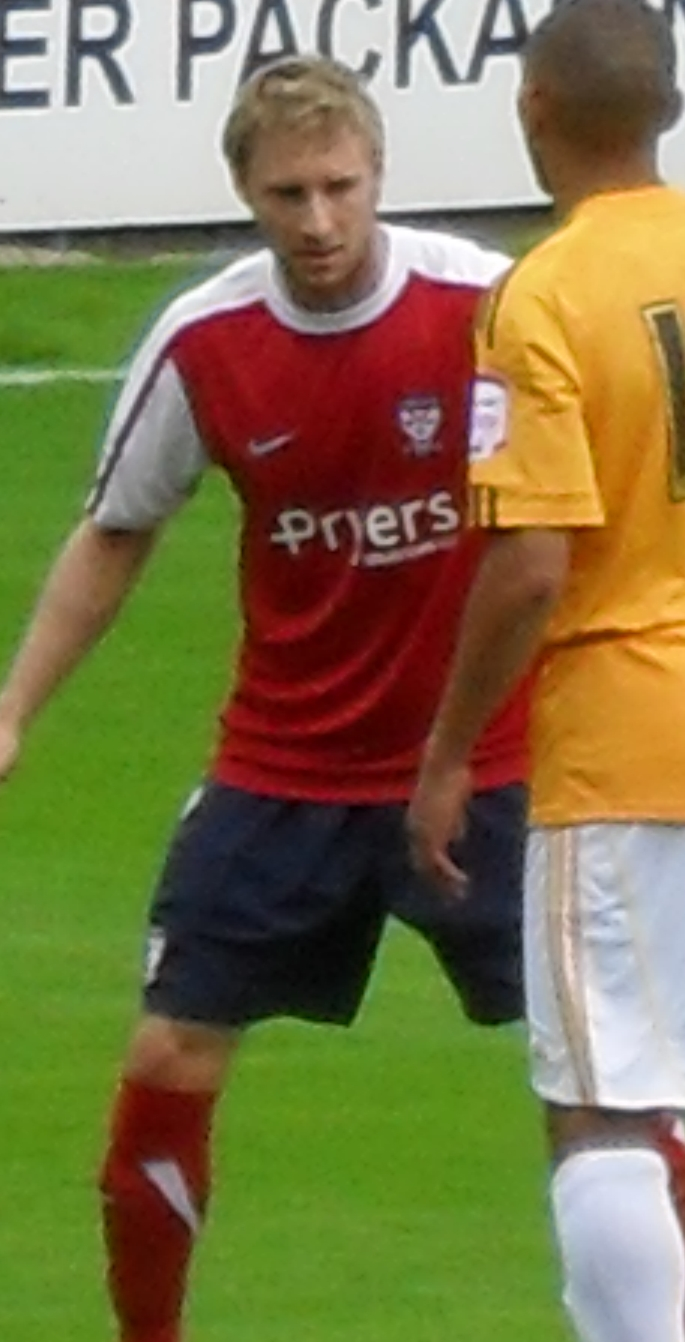
Carruthers playing for York City in 2010

Carruthers made his first appearance of 2010–11 in the opening match, a 2–1 home defeat to Kidderminster Harriers on 14 August 2010, in which he was substituted in the 65th minute. He suffered a knee injury in a 3–0 home victory over Altrincham on 28 August and it was believed this would keep him out of the team for a month. Carruthers made his return as an 81st-minute substitute in a 2–0 victory away to Kidderminster in the FA Cup fourth qualifying round on 23 October. His first start since August came on 17 November in a 3–0 home victory over League Two club Rotherham United in an FA Cup first round replay. He scored his first goal of the season in the 87th minute of a 2–1 defeat away to Darlington on 23 April 2011. His season finished with 29 appearances and 1 goal and was released by York on 23 June.

=== Gateshead and Hereford United ===
On 27 July 2011, Carruthers joined Conference Premier club Gateshead on a one-year contract. He made his debut on 13 August in a 3–2 away win over Kidderminster. Carruthers was released by Gateshead on 30 April 2012.

He went on trial with newly relegated Conference Premier club Hereford United in July 2012, who were managed by his former York manager Martin Foyle. During a pre-season friendly against Evesham United, Carruthers clashed heads with teammate Greg Tindle and required seven stitches, with the match being abandoned. He signed for the club on 20 July.

=== Later career ===
Carruthers signed for newly relegated Southern League Premier Division club Corby Town on 21 June 2013. He scored 5 goals in 50 appearances for Corby in 2013–14, while they finished in 11th place in the Southern League Premier Division table. He was the club captain that season and won the Players' Player of the Year award.

Carruthers signed for Conference North club Brackley Town on 7 July 2014 on a one-year contract. Carruthers made 27 appearances in 2014–15 for a Brackley team that ranked 18th in the Conference North table. He re-signed for Corby Town on 9 June 2015 following their promotion to the National League North. Having made 14 appearances for Corby, he was allowed to leave to seek regular football, and joined Southern League Premier Division club Kettering on dual registration on 13 November. Having been limited by injuries and family and work commitments, Carruthers left Kettering on 12 September 2016. He later retired from football.

== International career ==
Carruthers represented the England national under-20 team over a period of two years, first being called into the squad for a match against Switzerland in November 2002. Carruthers made his debut in this match, starting in a 2–0 defeat at home on 12 December. He played at the 2003 Toulon Tournament, marking Cristiano Ronaldo when the team played Portugal, with Carruthers saying in retrospect "I did okay against him though." He started in all four of England's match in the tournament, which they were knocked out of following a 1–0 defeat to Japan. He was named in the squad for a friendly against the Czech Republic on 9 October 2003 and entered the match as a half-time substitute before being forced to leave after around 60 minutes due to an injury. He was selected in the squad for the 2003 FIFA World Youth Championship and played in two of England's three matches at the tournament. He earned 11 caps for the team from 2002 to 2003.

== Style of play ==
Carruthers was left footed and versatile, being able to play as a left-back, left wing-back and left midfielder. He also played in a more attacking role as a left winger. However, he stated his strongest position was at left-back. He predominantly played as a left-back for Northampton and Bristol Rovers, but on his arrival at York he was converted to playing in left midfield.

== Career statistics ==
Appearances and goals by club, season and competition
Club	Season	League			FA Cup		League Cup		Other		Total	
Club	Season	Division	Apps	Goals	Apps	Goals	Apps	Goals	Apps	Goals	Apps	Goals
Northampton Town	2000–01	Second Division	3	0	0	0	0	0	0	0	3	0
Northampton Town	2001–02	Second Division	13	1	0	0	0	0	1 (Note: Appearance(s) in Football League Trophy)	0	14	1
Northampton Town	2002–03	Second Division	33	0	3	0	1	0	1	0	38	0
Northampton Town	2003–04	Third Division	24	0	4	0	1	0	2	0	31	0
Northampton Town	2004–05	League Two	1	0	0	0	1	0	1	0	3	0
Northampton Town	Total		74	1	7	0	3	0	5	0	89	1
Hornchurch (loan)	2004–05	Conference South	3	0	—		—		1 (Note: Appearance(s) in FA Trophy)	0	4	0
Kettering Town (loan)	2004–05	Conference North	2	0	—		—		—		2	0
Bristol Rovers (loan)	2004–05	League Two	5	0	—		—		—		5	0
Bristol Rovers	2005–06	League Two	40	1	3	0	1	0	1	0	45	1
Bristol Rovers	2006–07	League Two	38	0	5	0	1	0	10 (Note: Seven appearances in Football League Trophy, three in League Two play-offs)	0	54	0
Bristol Rovers	2007–08	League One	17	0	4	0	2	0	1	0	24	0
Bristol Rovers	Total		100	1	12	0	4	0	12	0	128	1
Oxford United	2008–09	Conference Premier	35	0	4	0	—		3 (Note: One appearance in Conference League Cup, two in FA Trophy)	0	42	0
Oxford United	2009–10	Conference Premier	1	0	—		—		—		1	0
Oxford United	Total		36	0	4	0	—		3	0	43	0
Crawley Town (loan)	2009–10	Conference Premier	7	1	—		—		—		7	1
York City	2009–10	Conference Premier	26	2	4	0	—		9 (Note: Six appearances in FA Trophy, three appearances and one goal in Conference Premier play-offs)	1	39	3
York City	2010–11	Conference Premier	26	1	3	0	—		0	0	29	1
York City	Total		52	3	7	0	—		9	1	68	4
Gateshead	2011–12	Conference Premier	21	0	3	0	—		2	0	26	0
Hereford United	2012–13	Conference Premier	21	1	0	0	—		0	0	21	1
Corby Town	2013–14	Southern League Premier Division	40	4	6	1	—		4 (Note: One appearance in FA Trophy, two in Northamptonshire Senior Cup, one in Southern League Cup)	0	50	5
Brackley Town	2014–15	Conference North	27	0	0	0	—		0	0	27	0
Corby Town	2015–16	National League North	14	0	2	1	—		1 (Note: Appearance in Northamptonshire Senior Cup)	0	17	1
Kettering Town	2015–16	Southern League Premier Division	26	0	—		—		1	0	27	0
Kettering Town	2016–17	Southern League Premier Division	1	0	0	0	—		—		1	0
Kettering Town	Total		27	0	0	0	—		1	0	28	0
Career total			424	11	41	2	7	0	38	1	510	14

== Honours ==
Bristol Rovers

- Football League Two play-offs: 2007
- Football League Trophy runner-up: 2006–07
