= Adam Chapman =

Northern Irish footballer (born 1989)

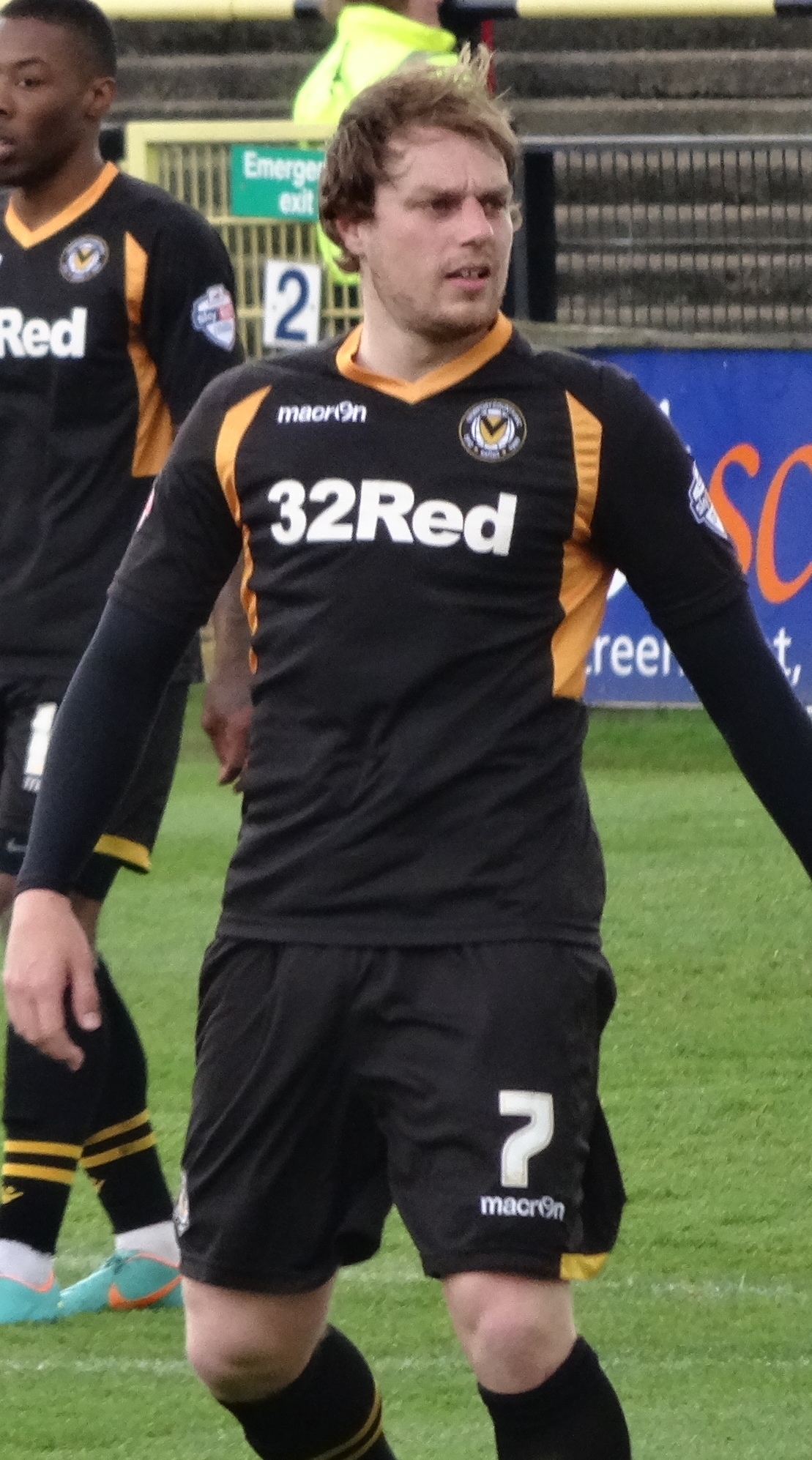
- Chapman playing for Newport County in 2014

Personal information
- Full name: Adam Henry Chapman
- Date of birth: 29 November 1989 (age 36)
- Place of birth: Doncaster, England
- Height: 5 ft 10 in (1.78 m)
- Position: Midfielder

Team information
- Current team: Retford FC

Youth career
- 2005–2007: Sheffield United

Senior career*
Years	Team	Apps	(Gls)
2007–2009	Sheffield United	0	(0)
2009	→ Oxford United (loan)	20	(2)
2009–2013	Oxford United	77	(5)
2012	→ Newport County (loan)	5	(0)
2013	→ Mansfield Town (loan)	11	(4)
2013–2015	Newport County	75	(5)
2015–2016	Mansfield Town	37	(2)
2016–2017	Gainsborough Trinity	3	(0)
2017	Boston United	25	(4)
2017–2020	Sheffield	81	(14)
2020–2021	Handsworth		
2021	Grantham Town	4	(1)
2021–2022	Ilkeston Town	15	(4)
2022–2023	Basford United		
2023–	Retford United		

International career
2007–2009	Northern Ireland U21	7	(0)
- * Club domestic league appearances and goals as of 28 February 2023

Adam Henry Chapman (born 29 November 1989) is a Northern Irish professional footballer who plays as a midfielder for Retford FC.

Born in Doncaster, he started his career with Sheffield United but failed to break into the first team and was loaned to Oxford United before joining them on a permanent basis in 2009. Chapman served a prison sentence in 2010 after being found guilty of causing a death by dangerous driving but rejoined Oxford on his release. He was subsequently loaned to Newport County and Mansfield Town before joining Newport on a permanent basis in 2013. He signed for Mansfield Town on a permanent basis for the 2015–16 season, playing for one season before moving into non-league football.

== Career ==
Scouted by Sheffield United as a youngster, Chapman went on to sign a professional deal with the club in the summer of 2007. He established himself as a regular in the reserve side, while also captaining the team. In January 2009, he joined Oxford United of the Conference Premier on a month's loan, which was later extended to the end of the 2008–09 season. He scored a 68th-minute free-kick in the 1–0 victory over Burton Albion in the penultimate game of the season, which prevented Burton winning the league until the final day. In March 2009 Chapman indicated that his future could lie away from Sheffield United, and that it was up to them to decide his future at the end of the season.

After failing to break into the Blades' first team he signed for Oxford United at the end of the 2008–09 season for a fee of £15,000 with a 50% sell-on clause. Chapman was named Man of the Match in Oxford's Football Conference play-off victory at Wembley on 16 May 2010, while awaiting sentencing for causing death by dangerous driving.

Shortly after his return to Oxford United in September 2011, he sustained an ankle injury in a friendly game. He made his first first-team appearance in the Football League as a late substitute against Morecambe on 10 December 2011. In January 2012 he went on trial with Blue Square Premier side Mansfield Town, with a view to a loan move, which did not materialise. At the end of the month he joined Newport County on a month's loan. Oxford agreed to extend the loan, but then recalled him after an injury to Jake Wright. Chapman made 13 League appearances for Oxford following his recall, scoring once, directly from a corner against Torquay on 9 April 2012. In July 2012 he signed a further two-year deal with the club, having turned down two earlier contract offers.

On 6 March 2013, he was loaned to Mansfield Town to the end of the season with a view to a permanent move. In his second appearance for Mansfield, and on his home debut, he scored a hat-trick against Stockport County. Mansfield were promoted to League Two at the end of the 2012–13 season but Chapman chose to sign for Newport County, who had also been promoted to League Two as Conference Premier play-off winners, for an undisclosed transfer fee. He was offered a new contract by Newport in May 2015 but chose to move on, signing a permanent one-year deal with Mansfield on 14 May. Chapman left Mansfield by mutual consent in September 2016.

On 22 November 2016, Chapman signed for Gainsborough Trinity of the National League North. In January 2017 he moved to Gainsborough's Lincolnshire neighbours Boston United, and in November the same year he moved on to Sheffield FC. In July 2020, he signed for Northern Counties East Football League Premier Division side Handsworth. In August 2021, he signed for Northern Premier League Premier Division side Grantham Town. In October 2021, he dropped down a division to sign for Northern Premier League Division One East side Ilkeston Town. Following a spell with Basford United, in February 2023, Chapman joined Central Midlands League North Division club Retford United in order to be closer to his home.

== Personal life ==
Chapman pleaded guilty to causing the death of Tom Bryan by driving dangerously in his Vauxhall Corsa on 9 May 2009. On 4 June 2010 he was sentenced to 30 months in a Young Offenders Institute. Upon his release on 2 September 2011, Chapman rejoined Oxford on a contract to the end of the 2011–12 season.

In October 2012, while shaking his baby's milk, he left the cap off the bottle and the boiling milk spilled onto his chest, scalding his nipple. He went to A&E, but recovered to play in Oxford's 3–1 away win against Wycombe Wanderers the following day.

== Career statistics ==
As of match played 16 December 2017

Appearances and goals by club, season and competition
Club	Season	League			FA Cup		League Cup		Other		Total	
Club	Season	Division	Apps	Goals	Apps	Goals	Apps	Goals	Apps	Goals	Apps	Goals
Oxford United	2008–09	Conference Premier	20	2	0	0	—		0	0	20	2
Oxford United	2009–10	Conference Premier	37	3	3	0	—		5 (Note: Two appearances in the FA Trophy and three in the Conference Premier play-offs)	0	45	3
Oxford United	2011–12	League Two	14	1	0	0	0	0	0	0	14	1
Oxford United	2012–13	League Two	26	1	3	0	2	0	3	0	34	1
Oxford United	Total		97	7	6	0	2	0	8	0	113	7
Newport County (loan)	2011–12	Conference Premier	5	0	0	0	—		0	0	5	0
Mansfield Town (loan)	2012–13	Conference Premier	11	4	0	0	—		0	0	11	4
Newport County	2013–14	League Two	39	2	3	0	2	0	2	1	46	3
Newport County	2014–15	League Two	36	3	0	0	1	0	1	0	38	3
Newport County	Total		75	5	3	0	3	0	3	1	84	6
Mansfield Town	2015–16	League Two	37	2	2	0	1	0	1	0	41	2
Mansfield Town	2016–17	League Two	5	0	0	0	1	0	1	0	7	0
Mansfield Town	Total		42	2	2	0	2	0	2	0	48	2
Gainsborough Trinity	2016–17	National League North	3	0	0	0	—		0	0	3	0
Boston United	2016–17	National League North	14	3	0	0	—		0	0	14	3
Boston United	2017–18	National League North	11	1	0	0	—		0	0	11	1
Boston United	Total		25	4	0	0	0	0	0	0	25	4
Career total			258	22	11	0	7	0	13	1	289	23

== Honours ==
Oxford United

- Conference Premier play-offs: 2010
