= Sam Deering =

English footballer (born 1991)

Personal information
- Full name: Sam Deering
- Date of birth: 26 February 1991 (age 35)
- Place of birth: Stepney, England
- Height: 1.65 m (5 ft 5 in)
- Position: Midfielder

Team information
- Current team: Saffron Walden Town

Youth career
- Chelsea
- Charlton Athletic
- 2006–2008: Oxford United

Senior career*
Years	Team	Apps	(Gls)
2008–2011	Oxford United	48	(4)
2009	→ Newport County (loan)	4	(0)
2010	→ Newport County (loan)	3	(0)
2011	→ Barnet (loan)	16	(2)
2011–2012	Barnet	44	(3)
2012–2014	Cheltenham Town	67	(0)
2014–2016	Whitehawk	60	(15)
2016–2017	Ebbsfleet United	43	(8)
2017–2019	Billericay Town	80	(15)
2019–2021	Dagenham & Redbridge	27	(2)
2021–2023	Farnborough	57	(4)
2023	Bishop's Stortford	16	(2)
2023–2024	Brentwood Town	9	(1)
2023	→ Romford (dual registration)	8	(4)
2024–	Saffron Walden Town	69	(16)

International career^{‡}
2010	England C	2	(0)
- * Club domestic league appearances and goals as of 12:00, 4 February 2023 (UTC) ‡ National team caps and goals as of 19:52, 26 July 2011 (UTC)

Sam Deering (born 26 February 1991) is an English footballer who plays as a midfielder for Saffron Walden Town.

== Playing career ==
Deering spent time as a youth team player with Chelsea and Charlton Athletic before joining Oxford United's academy in 2006.

He was promoted to the first team in 2008 and went on to make his first team debut against Weymouth on 12 August of that year. Deering scored twice in December 2008 before breaking his leg against Salisbury City. He was fined and warned about his future conduct later that week after making racist comments on a social networking website. In a club statement, the Oxford United chairman Kelvin Thomas said: "We take this issue very seriously. I have spoken to Sam personally and he has been made aware that we will not tolerate such comments." Thomas added: "Knowing Sam and his background I am confident he is not a racist. He must understand he is a role model and even his throwaway comments have an impact on people's lives."

Upon returning to action in September 2009, Deering joined Newport County on loan for a month, making four league appearances during his stay with the club.

He made his first appearance for Oxford in ten months against Altrincham on 31 October, and scored his first goal of the 2009–10 season against Histon on 13 February 2010. Deering signed a new contract in March 2010, and helped the club win promotion back to the Football League in the 2010 Conference play-off final at Wembley Stadium, most notably by setting up the final and third goal.

In November 2010, he rejoined Newport County on loan. He returned to Oxford on 4 January 2011, having made three appearances whilst on loan. In February 2011, he was loaned to Barnet for the remainder of the season, where he helped them avoid relegation. The move was made permanent at the end of the season.

Deering joined Cheltenham Town on 5 July 2012, spending two years at Whaddon Road before moving to Conference South side Whitehawk in 2014. Deering was named in the Conference South team of the season for 2014–15 alongside teammates Nick Arnold and Lee Hills.

Shortly after Steve King's departure as manager at Whitehawk, with his contract due to expire at the end of the season, Deering joined Ebbsfleet United for an undisclosed fee in March 2016. Deering joined Billericay Town for the 2017–18 season.

On 14 November 2019, he went back full-time when he signed for National League side Dagenham & Redbridge on a two-year deal. He was released by Dagenham along with five others in June 2021 following the expiration of his contract.

Deering joined Farnborough in July 2021. He went on to win the 2021–22 Southern League Playoffs with Farnborough, scoring the winner in the 86th minute to make it 2–1 against Hayes & Yeading United in the playoff final, earning Farnborough promotion to the National League South.

On 2 February 2023, Deering signed for Bishop's Stortford.

On 10 August 2023, Deering signed for Brentwood Town. Six days later, Romford announced Deering had joined the club on a dual registration deal. At the end of that season, he helped Romford win the 2024 FA Vase final, scoring the second goal in a 3–0 win over Great Wakering Rovers at Wembley Stadium, in which he won Man of the match.

Deering signed for Saffron Walden Town on 23 June 2024, later becoming player/assistant manager at the club.

== Career statistics ==
As of 8 June 2026

Appearances and goals by club, season and competition
Club	Season	League			FA Cup		EFL Cup		Other		Total	
Club	Season	Division	Apps	Goals	Apps	Goals	Apps	Goals	Apps	Goals	Apps	Goals
Oxford United	2008–09	Conference Premier	19	2	4	0	—		1 (Note: Appearance(s) in EFL Trophy)	0	24	2
Oxford United	2009–10	Conference Premier	23	2	3	0	—		6 (Note: Four appearances in FA Trophy, two in Conference Premier play-offs)	0	32	2
Oxford United	2010–11	League Two	6	0	1	0	1	0	1	0	9	0
Oxford United	Total		48	4	8	0	1	0	8	0	65	4
Newport County (loan)	2009–10	Conference South	4	0	—		—		—		4	0
Newport County (loan)	2010–11	Conference Premier	3	0	—		—		2 (Note: Appearances in FA Trophy)	0	5	0
Newport County (loan)	Total		7	0	—		—		2	0	9	0
Barnet (loan)	2010–11	League Two	16	2	—		—		—		16	2
Barnet	2011–12	League Two	44	3	2	0	1	0	6	0	53	3
Barnet	Total		60	5	2	0	1	0	6	0	69	5
Cheltenham Town	2012–13	League Two	32	0	3	0	1	0	3 (Note: One appearance in EFL Trophy, two in League Two play-offs)	0	39	0
Cheltenham Town	2013–14	League Two	35	0	1	0	2	0	1	0	39	0
Cheltenham Town	Total		67	0	4	0	3	0	4	0	78	0
Whitehawk	2014–15	Conference South	36	9	3	0	—		4 (Note: Three appearances and one goal in National League South play-offs, one in FA Trophy)	1	43	10
Whitehawk	2015–16	National League South	24	6	7	4	—		1	1	32	11
Whitehawk	Total		60	15	10	4	—		5	2	75	21
Ebbsfleet United	2015–16	National League South	6	0	—		—		3 (Note: Appearances in National League South play-offs)	0	9	0
Ebbsfleet United	2016–17	National League South	37	8	3	0	—		6 (Note: Three appearances in FA Trophy, three in National League South play-offs)	0	46	8
Ebbsfleet United	Total		43	8	3	0	—		9	0	55	8
Billericay Town	2017–18	IL Premier Division	43	12	8	1	—		8	2	59	15
Billericay Town	2018–19	National League South	28	2	6	3	—		2	0	36	5
Billericay Town	2019–20	National League South	9	1	5	1	—		—		14	2
Billericay Town	Total		80	15	19	5	—		10	2	109	22
Dagenham & Redbridge	2019–20	National League	9	0	—		—		1	0	10	0
Dagenham & Redbridge	2020–21	National League	18	2	3	0	—		1	0	22	2
Dagenham & Redbridge	Total		27	2	3	0	—		2	0	32	2
Farnborough	2021–22	SFL Premier Division South	41	4	3	0	—		5 (Note: Three appearances in FA Trophy, two appearances and one goal in SFL Premier Division South play-offs)	1	49	5
Farnborough	2022–23	National League South	16	0	6	0	—		1	0	23	0
Farnborough	Total		57	4	9	0	—		6	0	72	5
Bishop's Stortford	2022-23	Isthmian League Premier Division	16	2	0	0	---		0	0	16	2
Brentwood Town	2023-24	Isthmian League North Division	18	1	1	1	---		1	0	20	2
Romford	2023-24	Essex Senior League	11	7	0	0	---		7	1	18	8
Saffron Walden Town	2024-25	Essex Senior League	29	4	3	0	---		0	0	32	4
Saffron Walden Town	2025-26	Essex Senior League	37	16	2	0	---		4	0	43	16
Saffron Walden Town	Total		66	20	5	0	--		4	0	75	20
Career total			560	83	64	10	5	0	64	6	693	99

== Honours ==
Romford

- FA Vase: 2023–24
