= Marcus Kelly =

English footballer (born 1986)

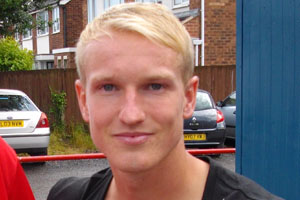
- Kelly in 2012

Personal information
- Full name: Marcus Philip Kelly
- Date of birth: 16 March 1986 (age 40)
- Place of birth: Kettering, England
- Height: 1.70 m (5 ft 7 in)
- Position: Midfielder

Youth career
- –2004: Rushden & Diamonds

Senior career*
Years	Team	Apps	(Gls)
2004–2009	Rushden & Diamonds	157	(12)
2009–2010	Oxford United	3	(0)
2009	→ Kettering Town (loan)	2	(0)
2010–2012	Kettering Town	84	(4)
2011–2012	→ Mansfield Town (loan)	1	(0)
2012–2013	Tamworth	35	(1)
2013–2017	Forest Green Rovers	124	(11)
2017–2018	Wrexham	43	(2)
2018–2020	Kettering Town		
2020–2021	Nuneaton Borough		
2021	Peterborough Sports		

International career
2007	England C	1	(0)
- * Club domestic league appearances and goals as of 07:07, 1 May 2018 (UTC)

Marcus Philip Kelly (born 16 March 1986) is an English footballer who plays as a midfielder.

== Career ==
=== Rushden & Diamonds ===
Born in Kettering, Northamptonshire, Kelly began his career playing for Second Division side Rushden & Diamonds. After impressing in the reserve team, he made his debut in a 3–0 home defeat to AFC Bournemouth on 27 March 2004.

=== Kettering Town ===
Kelly completed his permanent transfer to his hometown club Kettering Town on 7 January 2010.

=== Tamworth ===
On 5 July 2012, Kelly signed for Tamworth, along with former Kettering teammate Adam Cunnington and Tommy Wright, with Kelly and Cunnington teaming up with their former manager at Kettering, Marcus Law. Kelly scored his first goal for Tamworth away at Hyde in a 2–1 defeat. He scored a hat-trick in the FA Trophy first round against Lincoln City to ensure Tamworth progressed to the second round.

=== Forest Green Rovers ===
Kelly signed a one-year deal at Forest Green Rovers on 17 July 2013, after impressing management while on trial during pre-season – including a 2–0 win over League One side Swindon Town having been recommended to the club by Marcus Law. He made his debut for the club on 10 August 2013 where he scored a hat-trick in an 8–0 win over Hyde. In February 2014, he signed a contract extension keeping him at the club until the summer of 2015.

At the end of his first season at the club, he was voted Supporters Player of the Year, Players Player of the Year and won the club's Goal of the Season award. In February 2015, he agreed a new one-year contract with Forest Green, keeping him at The New Lawn until the end of the 2015–16 season. He made his hundredth league appearance for the club on 9 April 2016 in a 1–1 away draw against Braintree Town.

=== Wrexham ===
On 23 June 2017, Kelly joined Wrexham on a one-year deal.

Kelly was released by Wrexham in May 2018.

=== Return to Kettering Town ===
Following his release from Wrexham, Kelly would drop two levels down the football pyramid to rejoin Kettering Town on 13 July 2018, the team now playing in the Southern Football League Premier Central. At the end of the 2018–19 season he helped Kettering to achieve promotion to the National League North as champions.

=== Nuneaton Borough ===
At the end of the curtailed 2019–20 season Kelly was released by Kettering and signed for Nuneaton Borough

=== Peterborough Sports ===
After leaving Nuneaton Borough in September 2021, Kelly signed for league rivals Peterborough Sports in October 2021.

== Career statistics ==
As of 28 April 2018

Appearances and goals by club, season and competition
Club	Season	League			FA Cup		League Cup		Other		Total	
Club	Season	Division	Apps	Goals	Apps	Goals	Apps	Goals	Apps	Goals	Apps	Goals
Rushden & Diamonds	2003–04	Second Division	8	0	0	0	0	0	0	0	8	0
Rushden & Diamonds	2004–05	League Two	11	0	1	0	1	0	0	0	13	0
Rushden & Diamonds	2005–06	League Two	41	3	3	0	1	0	2	0	47	3
Rushden & Diamonds	2006–07	Conference National	34	5	2	0	–		1	0	37	5
Rushden & Diamonds	2007–08	Conference National	24	0	2	1	–		0	0	26	1
Rushden & Diamonds	2008–09	Conference National	39	3	0	0	–		0	0	39	3
Rushden & Diamonds	Total		157	11	8	1	2	0	3	0	170	12
Oxford United	2009–10	Conference National	3	0	0	0	0	0	0	0	3	0
Kettering Town (loan)	2009–10	Conference National	4	0	0	–		0	0	0	4	0
Kettering Town	2009–10	Conference National	13	2	0	0	–		0	0	13	2
Kettering Town	2010–11	Conference National	40	2	1	0	–		2	0	43	2
Kettering Town	2011–12	Conference National	27	0	4	0	–		0	0	31	0
Kettering Town	Total		84	4	5	0	–		2	0	91	4
Mansfield Town (loan)	2011–12	Conference National	3	0	0	0	–		1	0	4	0
Tamworth	2012–13	Conference National	35	1	1	0	–		4	3	40	5
Forest Green Rovers	2013–14	Conference National	33	9	1	0	–		2	0	36	9
Forest Green Rovers	2014–15	Conference National	41	2	2	0	–		3	1	46	3
Forest Green Rovers	2015–16	National League	30	0	2	0	–		1	0	34	0
Forest Green Rovers	2016–17	National League	20	0	0	0	–		3	2	23	2
Forest Green Rovers	Total		124	11	5	0	–		9	3	139	14
Wrexham	2017–18	National League	43	2	1	0	–		0	0	44	2
Career total			449	29	20	1	2	0	19	6	490	36
