= Damian Batt =

English footballer (born 1984)

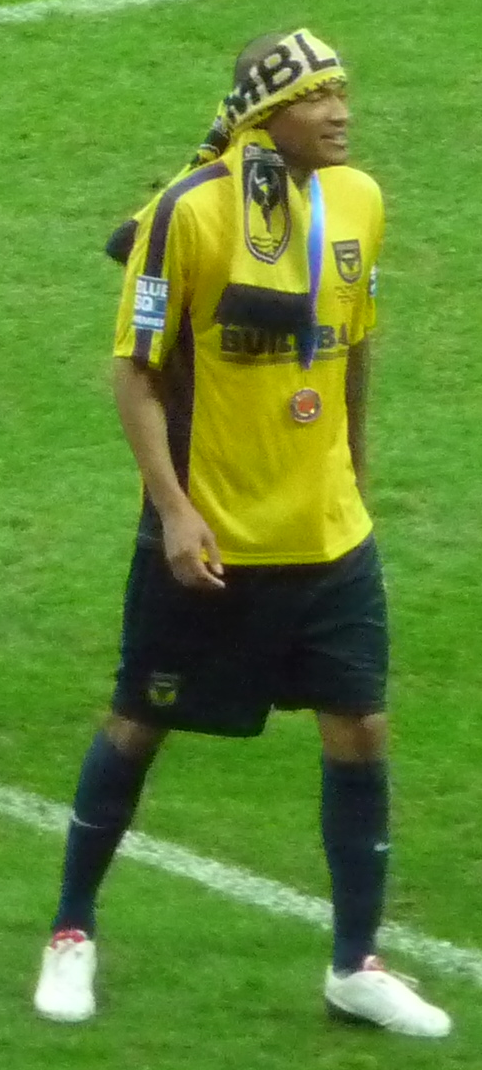
- Batt with Oxford United following the 2010 Conference National play-off final

Personal information
- Full name: Damian Alexander Nathaniel Batt
- Date of birth: 16 September 1984 (age 42)
- Place of birth: Welwyn Garden City, England
- Height: 5 ft 10 in (1.78 m)
- Position: Defender

Youth career
- 2001–2004: Norwich City

Senior career*
| Years | Team | Apps | (Gls) |
| 2004 | Redbridge | 1 | (0) |
| 2004–2006 | Barnet | 37 | (1) |
| 2006–2007 | St Albans City | 22 | (2) |
| 2007–2008 | Stevenage Borough | 10 | (0) |
| 2007 | → St Albans City (loan) | 8 | (1) |
| 2008 | → Woking (loan) | 13 | (1) |
| 2008 | Fisher Athletic | 7 | (1) |
| 2008–2009 | Grays Athletic | 10 | (0) |
| 2009–2013 | Oxford United | 158 | (3) |
| 2013–2014 | Eastleigh | 15 | (0) |
| 2014–2015 | Dagenham & Redbridge | 28 | (0) |
| Total | | 309 | (9) |
- * Club domestic league appearances and goals

Damian Alexander Nathaniel Batt (born 16 September 1984) is an English footballer who most recently played for Dagenham & Redbridge.

== Career ==
Batt was born in Welwyn Garden City, Hertfordshire. He started his career in the youth system at Norwich City, even though his signature was sought by many London clubs. He scored Norwich's first goal in the 2-1 FA Youth Cup victory over the previous season's champions Aston Villa in December 2002. He accompanied the first team during the 2003 pre-season tour to the Netherlands and prior to the signing of Marc Edworthy, was acting as second choice right back behind Keith Briggs. In January 2004, it was announced that he would not be offered a new professional deal by the Canaries after 8 years at the club. In September 2004, he signed for Barnet, making his debut in a 3–1 win over Stevenage Borough in the EFL Trophy. Barnet won the Conference title in his first season with the club, gaining promotion to EFL League Two. In May 2005, he signed a new one-year contract with the club after making nineteen appearances in the previous campaign, scoring once in the 7–1 rout against Farnborough Town. He failed to secure a regular starting place for the club in the Football League and Barnet announced in May 2006 that he would not be retained.

He subsequently signed for newly promoted Conference National side St Albans City on a non-contract basis in August 2006. His debut came in September, a 2–1 win over Oxford United. He impressed for St Albans and was signed by Stevenage Borough on a free transfer in January 2007. In September 2007, after a couple of bad injuries including a broken ankle he re-joined his former club St Albans on loan for three months. In February 2008 upon his return to Stevenage, he was loaned out again to fellow Conference National side Woking, where he stayed until the end of the season.

In the summer of 2008, Batt decided to leave the club. His stay at the south London club was only brief and he signed for Conference Premier side Grays Athletic on a non-contract basis in October 2008. He impressed during his short spell with the club and despite the offer of a new contract, he signed for fellow Conference Premier side Oxford United in January 2009. He played a major part in the club's success featuring in the 2010 Conference National play-off final win over York City at Wembley Stadium, gaining promotion to League Two. In the summer of 2010, he signed a two-year contract extension on a deal until 2013. The following season, he was included in the League Two PFA Team of the Year after making thirty appearances. In May 2013, he decided to leave Oxford United, making 180 appearances and scoring three times.

In July 2013, he joined Major League Soccer side Vancouver Whitecaps FC. However, after a 6-month stay and longer contracts talks a long term move failed to materialise and in September 2013 he announced that he retired from professional football, which he described as "the hardest decision of my life", in order to pursue his business interests. Later on in the month he signed for part-time Conference South side Eastleigh, despite several offers from other clubs. He found his opportunities limited at the club making only twelve starts and departed Eastleigh in January 2014.

In June 2014, he came out of retirement and returned to full-time football with League Two side Dagenham & Redbridge penning a two-year contract. Dagenham released Batt from his contract on 20 April 2015.

== Personal life ==
His younger brother Shaun is also a professional footballer who has played in the Football League most notably for Peterborough United, Millwall and Leyton Orient.

== Career statistics ==
As of match played 3 April 2015.

Appearances and goals by club, season and competition
| Club | Season | League | | | FA Cup | | League Cup | | Other | | Total | |
| Club | Season | Division | Apps | Goals | Apps | Goals | Apps | Goals | Apps | Goals | Apps | Goals |
|---|---|---|---|---|---|---|---|---|---|---|---|---|
| Redbridge | 2004–05 | Conference South | 1 | 0 | — | | — | | — | | 1 | 0 |
| Barnet | 2004–05 | Conference National | 15 | 1 | 0 | 0 | — | | 4 (Note: Two appearances in EFL Trophy, two in FA Trophy) | 0 | 19 | 1 |
| Barnet | 2005–06 | League Two | 22 | 0 | 1 | 0 | 2 | 0 | 2 (Note: Appearance(s) in EFL Trophy) | 0 | 27 | 0 |
| Barnet | Total | | 37 | 1 | 1 | 0 | 2 | 0 | 6 | 0 | 46 | 1 |
| St Albans City | 2006–07 | Conference National | 22 | 2 | 0 | 0 | — | | 1 (Note: Appearance(s) in FA Trophy) | 0 | 23 | 2 |
| Stevenage Borough | 2006–07 | Conference National | 8 | 0 | 0 | 0 | — | | 0 | 0 | 8 | 0 |
| Stevenage Borough | 2007–08 | Conference Premier | 2 | 0 | 0 | 0 | — | | 2 (Note: One appearance in FA Trophy, one in Conference League Cup) | 0 | 4 | 0 |
| Stevenage Borough | Total | | 10 | 0 | 0 | 0 | — | | 2 | 0 | 12 | 0 |
| St Albans City (loan) | 2007–08 | Conference South | 8 | 1 | 0 | 0 | — | | 0 | 0 | 8 | 1 |
| Woking (loan) | 2007–08 | Conference Premier | 13 | 1 | — | | — | | 3 (Note: One appearance in Conference League Cup, two in Surrey Senior Cup) | 0 | 16 | 1 |
| Fisher Athletic | 2008–09 | Conference South | 7 | 1 | 1 | 0 | — | | — | | 8 | 1 |
| Grays Athletic | 2008–09 | Conference Premier | 10 | 0 | — | | — | | 2 (Note: One appearance in FA Trophy, one in Essex Senior Cup) | 0 | 12 | 0 |
| Oxford United | 2008–09 | Conference Premier | 16 | 0 | — | | — | | — | | 16 | 0 |
| Oxford United | 2009–10 | Conference Premier | 37 | 1 | 3 | 0 | — | | 5 (Note: Two appearances in FA Trophy, three in Conference Premier play-offs) | 0 | 45 | 1 |
| Oxford United | 2010–11 | League Two | 28 | 0 | 1 | 0 | 1 | 0 | 0 | 0 | 30 | 0 |
| Oxford United | 2011–12 | League Two | 40 | 1 | 1 | 0 | 1 | 0 | 2 | 0 | 44 | 1 |
| Oxford United | 2012–13 | League Two | 37 | 1 | 3 | 0 | 2 | 0 | 3 | 0 | 45 | 1 |
| Oxford United | Total | | 158 | 3 | 8 | 0 | 4 | 0 | 10 | 0 | 180 | 3 |
| Eastleigh | 2013–14 | Conference South | 15 | 0 | 1 | 0 | — | | 4 | 0 | 20 | 0 |
| Dagenham & Redbridge | 2014–15 | League Two | 28 | 0 | 2 | 0 | 1 | 0 | 1 | 0 | 32 | 0 |
| Career total | | | 309 | 9 | 13 | 0 | 7 | 0 | 29 | 0 | 358 | 9 |

== Honours ==
Barnet

- Conference National: 2004–05

Oxford United

- Conference Premier play-offs: 2009–10

Individual

- PFA Team of the Year: 2010–11 Football League Two
