= Alfie Potter =

English footballer (born 1989)

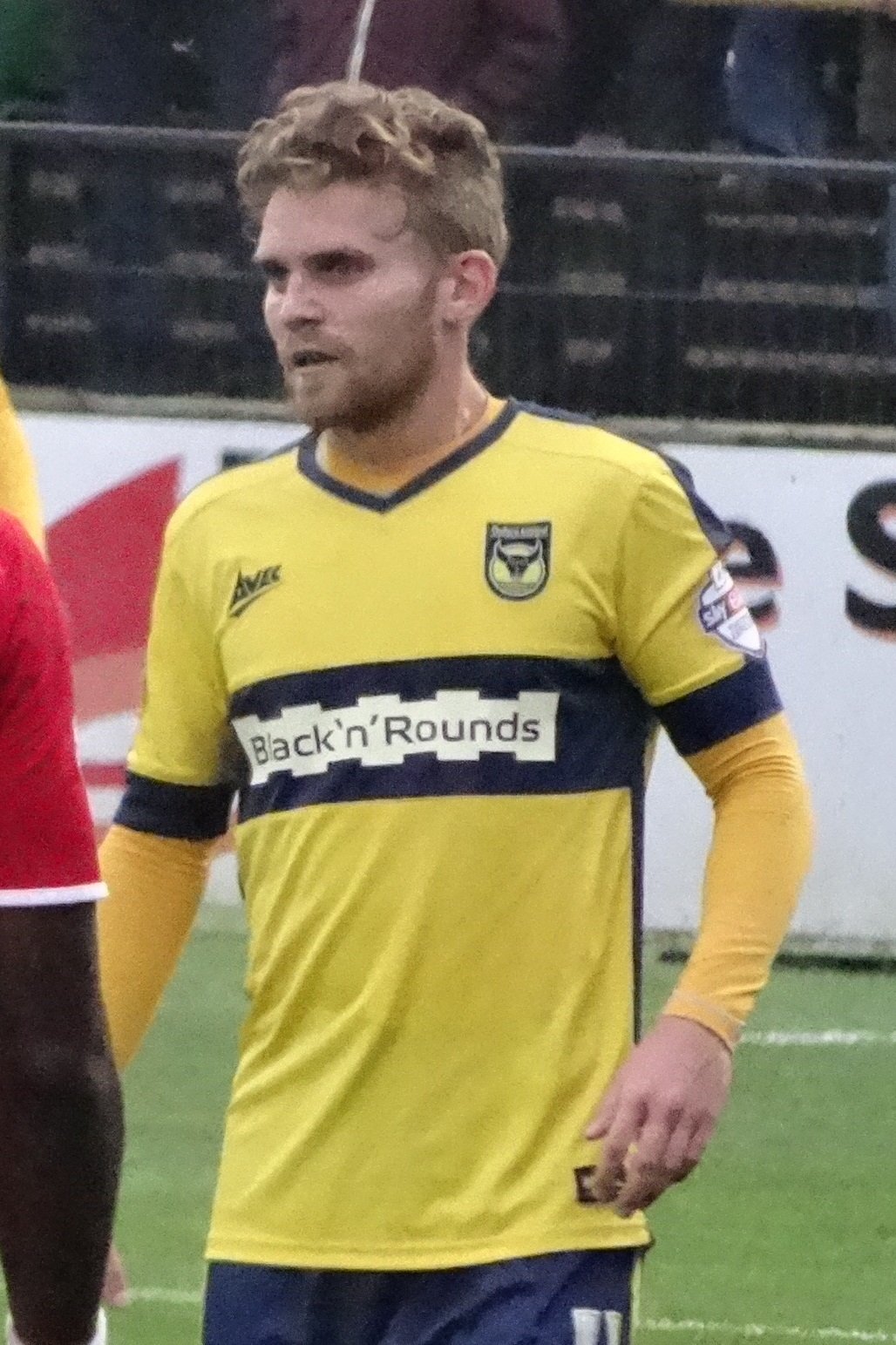
- Potter playing for Oxford United in 2014

Personal information
- Full name: Alfie James Potter
- Date of birth: 9 January 1989 (age 37)
- Place of birth: Islington, England
- Height: 5 ft 7 in (1.70 m)
- Position: Midfielder

Team information
- Current team: Oxford City
- Number: 16

Youth career
- 2003: Wimbledon
- 2003–2006: Millwall

Senior career*
Years	Team	Apps	(Gls)
2006–2007	Waltham Forest	1	(0)
2007–2010	Peterborough United	2	(0)
2007	→ Kvinesdal (loan)	0	(0)
2007	→ Grays Athletic (loan)	1	(0)
2007–2008	→ Havant & Waterlooville (loan)	15	(2)
2008	→ AFC Wimbledon (loan)	4	(1)
2008–2009	→ Kettering Town (loan)	39	(1)
2009–2010	→ Oxford United (loan)	25	(6)
2010–2015	Oxford United	145	(20)
2015	AFC Wimbledon	15	(1)
2015–2017	Northampton Town	32	(1)
2017–2018	Mansfield Town	39	(5)
2018–2020	Billericay Town	1	(0)
2020–	Oxford City	66	(7)
- * Club domestic league appearances and goals as of 20 April 2024 (UTC)

Alfie James Potter (born 9 January 1989) is an English professional footballer who plays for Oxford City as a midfielder.

== Career ==
Potter came through the youth team ranks at Peterborough United, after being released by Wimbledon at the age of 14, then by Millwall aged 17. Before joining Peterborough he spent a few months at the Barking Abbey Centre for Football Excellence, where he made several first-team appearances for Waltham Forest in the Isthmian League. He signed his first professional contract with Peterborough on 1 June 2007, signing a one-year deal.

He joined Kvinesdal of the Norwegian 4th tier on loan in the summer of 2007, but failed to make any appearances. In September 2007 he had a month's loan spell at Grays Athletic. He made just one appearance, coming on as a substitute against Exeter City.

In November 2007 he made a loan move to Conference South side Havant & Waterlooville, for the rest of the season. He played in Havant's 5–2 fourth-round FA Cup defeat to Premier League side Liverpool on 26 January 2008. Potter played a big part in Havant's second goal to put Havant 2–1 ahead when his shot took a deflection off Martin Škrtel. For this feat, Potter was named "Player of the Round".

In December 2007, he was offered at new two-and-a-half-year deal by Peterborough, and, on 29 January 2008, he was recalled from his loan spell at Havant & Waterlooville.

On 29 February 2008, Potter was loaned to Isthmian League Premier Division side AFC Wimbledon, for a month. He made his first appearances for the Posh in the League upon his return. In July 2008, Potter was close to signing on loan for Conference National newcomers Kettering Town. However, Peterborough initially stalled the deal because of injury worries, but he finally completed his loan move to Kettering on 1 August 2008.

In May 2009, it was revealed that Lincoln City had enquired about Potter and his teammate Liam Hatch.

=== Oxford United ===
On 3 June 2009, Potter signed for Oxford United on a season-long loan. He scored five goals in 20 Conference National games as Oxford finished third and went on to win the playoff final 3–1 against York City, his last-minute goal at Wembley Stadium securing Oxford's return to the Football League after a four-year exile. At the end of the season he joined Oxford permanently for an undisclosed fee. His debut league goal, a "fine strike", came in a 2–2 draw against Wycombe on 9 April 2011, one of two goals he scored in the 2010–11 season. He scored twice more in the first half of the following season, before breaking his ankle in February 2012 and missing the rest of the season.

He returned for the start of the 2012–13 season, and on 5 September 2012 came off the bench to score an 88th-minute winner against local rivals Swindon Town in a first-round Football League Trophy match. He finished the season with a career-best haul of 11 goals (10 in the league).

On 16 January 2015, Potter left the club by mutual consent, having spent five and a half years with the U's. Later that day he returned to AFC Wimbledon.

=== Northampton Town ===
On 20 May 2015, it was announced that Potter would be reunited with former manager Chris Wilder by joining Northampton Town on a two-year contract. He scored his first and what turned out to be only goal for Northampton in a 2–1 win over Stevenage on 24 October 2015.

=== Mansfield Town ===
Potter signed for Mansfield Town in January 2017. He scored his first goal for the club in a 1–1 draw with Luton Town on 17 April 2017.

He was released by Mansfield at the end of the 2017–18 season.

=== Billericay Town ===
On 6 August 2018 he signed for Billericay Town of the National League South.

=== Oxford City ===
On 11 December 2020, Potter signed for National League South side Oxford City.

== Career statistics ==
As of match played 30 April 2017

Appearances and goals by club, season and competition
Club	Season	League			FA Cup		League Cup		Other		Total	
Club	Season	Division	Apps	Goals	Apps	Goals	Apps	Goals	Apps	Goals	Apps	Goals
Peterborough United	2007–08	League Two	2	0	0	0	1	0	0	0	3	0
Peterborough United	2008–09	League One	0	0	0	0	0	0	0	0	0	0
Peterborough United	Total		2	0	0	0	1	0	0	0	3	0
Grays Athletic (loan)	2007–08	Conference Premier	1	0	0	0	0	0	0	0	1	0
Havant & Waterlooville (loan)	2007–08	Conference South	15	2	4	0	0	0	0	0	19	2
AFC Wimbledon (loan)	2008–09	Conference South	4	1	0	0	0	0	0	0	4	1
Kettering Town (loan)	2008–09	Conference Premier	39	1	6	0	0	0	0	0	45	1
Oxford United (loan)	2009–10	Conference Premier	25	6	2	0	0	0	0	0	27	6
Oxford United	2010–11	League Two	38	2	1	0	2	0	1	0	42	2
Oxford United	2011–12	League Two	25	2	0	0	1	0	1	0	27	2
Oxford United	2012–13	League Two	43	10	4	0	2	0	3	1	52	11
Oxford United	2013–14	League Two	24	4	0	0	1	0	1	0	26	4
Oxford United	2014–15	League Two	15	2	3	1	1	0	1	0	20	3
Oxford United	Total		170	26	10	1	7	0	7	1	194	28
AFC Wimbledon	2014–15	League Two	15	1	0	0	0	0	0	0	15	1
Northampton Town	2015–16	League Two	21	1	2	0	2	0	1	0	26	1
Northampton Town	2016–17	League One	11	0	1	0	3	0	1	0	16	0
Northampton Town	Total		32	1	3	0	5	0	2	0	42	1
Mansfield Town	2016–17	League Two	12	1	0	0	0	0	0	0	12	1
Career total			290	33	23	1	13	0	9	1	335	35

== Honours ==
Northampton Town

- Football League Two: 2015–16
