= Kevin Sandwith =

English footballer

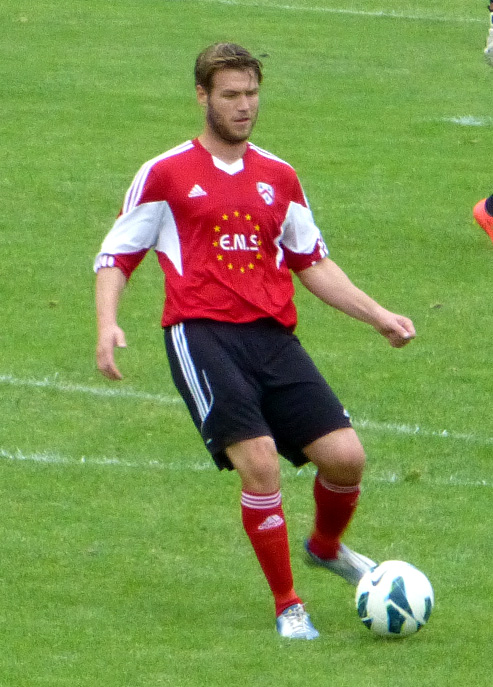
- Sandwith playing for AFC Wulfrunians

Personal information
- Date of birth: 30 April 1978 (age 48)
- Place of birth: Workington, England
- Positions: Defender; midfielder

Senior career*
Years	Team	Apps	(Gls)
1995–1999	Carlisle United	3	(0)
1999–2001	Telford United	38	(1)
2001–2002	Doncaster Rovers	12	(0)
2002–2004	Halifax Town	51	(2)
2004–2005	Lincoln City	40	(2)
2005–2006	Macclesfield Town	35	(3)
2006–2008	Chester City	54	(3)
2008–2009	Weymouth	30	(0)
2009–2010	Oxford United	32	(3)
2010–2011	Mansfield Town	24	(1)
2011–2012	Gainsborough Trinity	25	(1)
2012–2013	Buxton	0	(0)
2014	AFC Wulfrunians	1	(0)
Total		345	(16)
- * Club domestic league appearances and goals

Kevin Sandwith (born 30 April 1978) is an English retired professional footballer who played as a defender and midfielder for Northern Premier League Premier Division side Buxton.

He has previously played for Carlisle United, Telford United, Doncaster Rovers, Halifax Town, Lincoln City, Macclesfield Town, Chester City, Weymouth, Oxford United, Mansfield Town and Gainsborough Trinity.

== Career ==
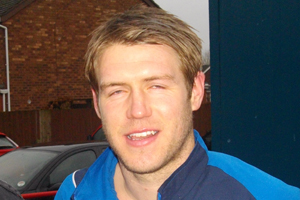
Kevin Sandwith

Sandwith began his career as a Youth Trainee at Carlisle United and went on to sign professional terms with them, making his league debut in October 1997. However, after only three further appearances, he was released by the Cumbrians in May 1998 and joined non-league Barrow. He made 14 appearances for Barrow, scoring three times, before moving to join Telford United. Comfortable either at left-back or in midfield, Sandwith stayed at Telford until the summer of 2001 without every really fully establishing himself. He moved on to Doncaster Rovers but, after starting the season as the regular left-back, a broken foot kept him on the sidelines for three months and he found it hard to regain a regular starting position. In November 2002, he moved on to Halifax Town and cemented a regular starting berth. A series of impressive performances began to draw attention and, having scored against them in the Football League Trophy earlier in the season, Lincoln City paid £10,000 for his services in March 2004. He spent a season and a half at Sincil Bank before a move to Macclesfield Town where he spent a season before joining Chester City. His first Chester goal ironically came against Macclesfield in September 2006.

Ex-Chester manager Mark Wright was a big admirer of Sandwith, stating that he is "undoubtedly one of the best players in this league at delivering a ball with his left foot, from free-kicks and corners".

On 28 December 2007, it was announced Sandwith was no longer in the club's plans and was available for sale. However, he returned to the starting line-up against Notts County on 19 January 2008 and he regularly figured in the first–team in the closing months of the season, leading to him being offered a new contract at the end of the campaign. But he turned down the contract and left the club. Sandwith signed for Weymouth on 1 July 2008, before moving to Oxford United in February 2009. Sandwith joined Mansfield Town by signing a one-year deal on 28 May 2010 after his release from Oxford United. Sandwith was released on 31 May 2011.

After spending the pre-season training with Eastwood Town, Sandwith joined Gainsborough Trinity in August 2011, debuting in the club's 3–1 Conference North victory at home to Solihull Moors on 13 August 2011. Sandwith was not amongst those players retained at the end of the 2011–12 season and thus left the club.

In June 2012 he joined Worcester City on trial but opted not to sign a new deal because of the distance the city is from his home. On 17 July he joined Buxton. On 30 March 2013 Sandwith Played his last game for Buxton losing 3–2 to Hednesford at Keys Park. In September 2014 he played once for AFC Wulfrunians.

=== Management ===
Sandwith regularly partners with fellow knob head Jamie Haynes in management, with Sandwith in an assistant management role, a position he held at Ellesmere Rangers in 2018. Sandwith also works with Joshy Green and Lukey Hughes at Crossbar Coaching. and held between 2021 and 2023 at Shifnal Town. Sandwith was first team coach to Haynes' assistant manager at Telford United.
