= Steven Kinniburgh =

Scottish footballer and manager

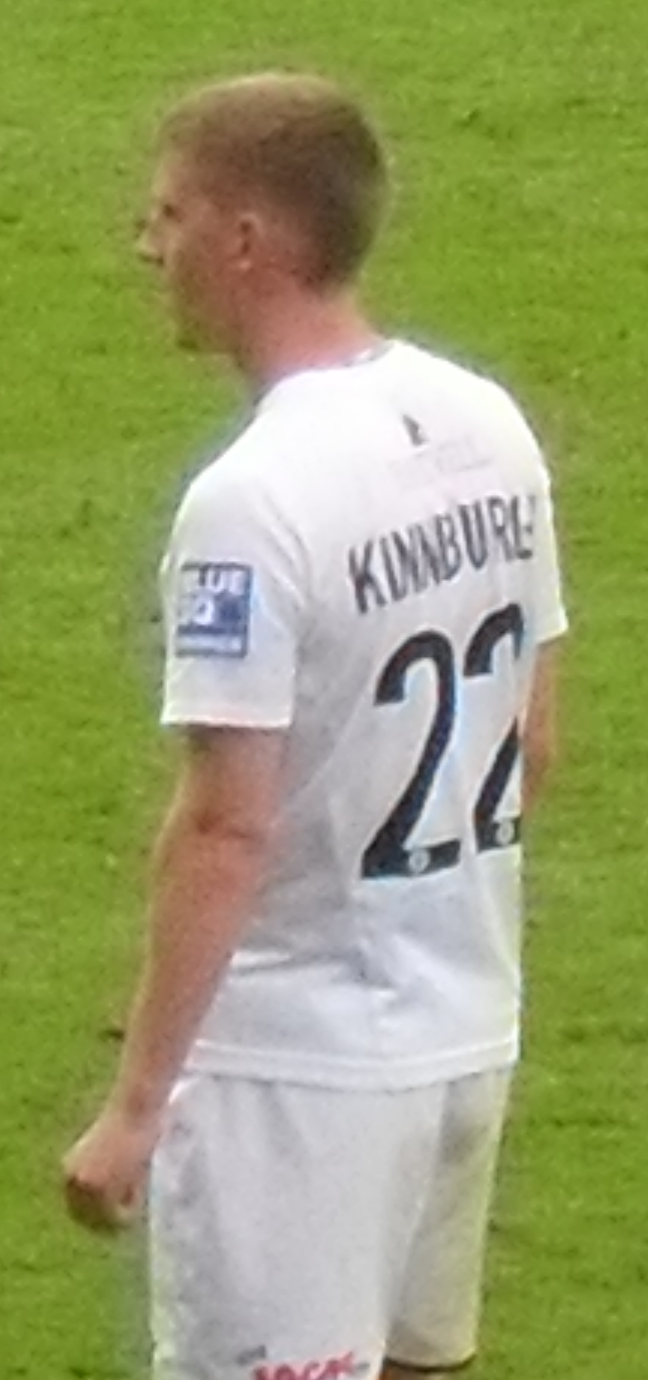
- Kinniburgh playing for Oxford United in 2009

Personal information
- Full name: Steven Steel Kinniburgh
- Date of birth: 13 June 1989 (age 37)
- Place of birth: Glasgow, Scotland
- Height: 6 ft 0 in (1.83 m)
- Position: Defender

Youth career
- 2001–2007: Rangers

Senior career*
Years	Team	Apps	(Gls)
2007–2010	Rangers	0	(0)
2008–2009	→ Queen of the South (loan)	2	(0)
2009	→ St Johnstone (loan)	0	(0)
2009	→ Oxford United (loan)	12	(1)
2010–2012	Oxford United	12	(0)
2011	→ Cambridge United (loan)	3	(0)
2012	AFC Telford United	1	(0)
2013	Bedford Town	?	(?)
2013–2016	Kettering Town	94	(5)
2016–2019	Corby Town	0	(0)

Managerial career
- 2017–2019: Corby Town
- 2019: Kettering Town (caretaker)
- * Club domestic league appearances and goals

Steven Steel Kinniburgh (born 13 June 1989) is a Scottish former professional footballer who played as a defender. He is the Academy Manager at Oxford United.

== Career ==
Born in Glasgow, Kinniburgh began his career with Rangers, and in December 2008 he joined Queen of the South on loan for two months. He made his debut against Livingston on 20 December. He then joined St Johnstone on loan in March 2009, until the end of the season.

In August 2009, he joined Oxford United on loan along with fellow Rangers reserve player Ross Perry. He returned to Rangers early, on 4 December, after picking up a knee injury that would rule him out until February. Kinniburgh was then released by Rangers at the end of the season. A couple of days later, he signed for Oxford United on a permanent basis.

On 5 August 2011, Kinniburgh joined Cambridge United on loan. He returned to his parent club after the loan ended, but on 27 January 2012, it was announced that his contract with Oxford would be cancelled by mutual agreement.

Kinniburgh then joined AFC Telford United on 16 March 2012. On 17 August 2012, he signed for Bedford Town.

On 6 June 2013, Kinniburgh moved to Kettering Town where he finished the 2013/14 season as club captain and appeared in all 42 league matches.

== Coaching career ==
On 17 December 2016 it was announced, that Kinniburgh had signed for Corby Town as a player-coach for the first team under manager Gary Mills. As well as being a player-coach for the first team, he also took the director of academy at the club.

After manager, Gary Mills, got fired on 9 April 2017, Kinniburgh was appointed as caretaker until they had signed a new manager, and was later given the job permanently. He resigned from the role in July 2019.

On 25 September 2019, Kinniburgh was named joint caretaker manager for Kettering Town together with Kettering player Luke Graham. Kinniburgh and Graham was replaced on 25 October 2019.

On 2 November 2022, Kinniburgh returned to Oxford United by replacing Dan Harris as the club's Academy Manager.

== Personal life ==
He is the younger brother of fellow footballer William Kinniburgh.
