= Mark Creighton =

English footballer

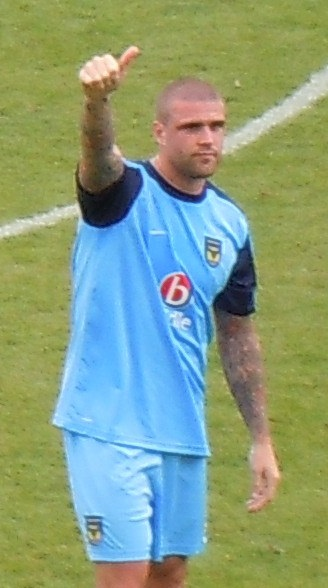
- Creighton playing for Oxford United in 2010

Personal information
- Full name: Mark Adam Creighton
- Date of birth: 8 October 1981 (age 45)
- Place of birth: Birmingham, England
- Position: Defender

Youth career
- 1999–2001: Kidderminster Harriers

Senior career*
Years	Team	Apps	(Gls)
2006–2009	Kidderminster Harriers	133	(4)
2009–2011	Oxford United	41	(1)
2010	→ Wrexham (loan)	6	(0)
2011–2013	Wrexham	78	(4)
Total		258	(9)
- * Club domestic league appearances and goals

Mark Adam Creighton (born 8 October 1981) is an English former professional footballer. He last played for Wrexham as a defender as well as being part of the club's coaching team. Creighton announced his retirement from playing on 23 December 2013. During his career, Creighton was affectionately nicknamed "The Beast" due to his stature and physical presence.

== Playing career ==
=== Kidderminster Harriers ===
Creighton began his career in the youth team at Kidderminster Harriers, before spending a number of years moving between non-league, amateur clubs in the Midlands including Moor Green, Paget Rangers and Halesowen Town. He eventually ended up at Redditch United where he became captain and won numerous awards. His success at Redditch secured him a return to the Harriers in 2006. During his three seasons at Aggborough Creighton became club captain and appeared 133 times for the club.

=== Oxford United ===
After three seasons at Kidderminster, in May 2009 Creighton joined Oxford United, where he became a regular starter. In 2010, he helped Oxford gain promotion out of the Conference Premier and into League Two. Although he was a regular in the first team with the Us he was selected less often during Oxford's first season back in the Football League and was subsequently loaned out at the end of 2010.

=== Wrexham ===
In November 2010, Creighton went out on loan to Conference Premier side Wrexham where, after a successful loan spell, he signed an 18-month contract. Creighton became a huge influence in the Wrexham side during the 2010/2011 season and played in the side that lost to Luton Town in the Conference Premier play-off semi-finals. In the 2011/2012 season Creighton again proved to be influential in the Wrexham defence playing a part in breaking the club record for the most clean sheets in a row for the club; goalkeeper Joslain Mayebi gave credit to his regular defence (Nathaniel Knight-Percival, Neil Ashton and Chris Westwood). Creighton played in massive matches for the Dragons during the 2011/2012 season including the FA Cup 3rd Round draw away to Brighton & Hove Albion and in the replay back at The Racecourse which Wrexham lost on penalties. He also took part in another play-off semi-final against Luton, which Wrexham lost for a second year running. In February 2012 Creighton signed a new two-year deal to keep him at the Racecourse until 2014. Creighton continued a successful pre-season into the 2012/2013 season, scoring against Woking on the first day of the season in a 3–1 win. But just three matches into the season he picked up a season-ending injury 6 minutes into an away match at Ebbsfleet United. During his time off the pitch Creighton set up his own business, Raw Ink Tattoo studio in nearby Coedpoeth. As well as his tattooing business Creighton also joined Welsh Premier League side Bala Town FC as a voluntary coach in January 2013. Creighton returned from injury on the final day of the 2012/2013 season in a match away to Mansfield Town. He took part in the following pre-season and started the first game of the 2013/2014 season against Welling United. His second game of the season came in the cross border derby against Chester, but in the first half he picked up another injury setting himself back once again. He returned from injury once again in a 1–3 loss away to his former club Kidderminster, coming on as a sub for Robert Ogleby in the 84th minute. He went on to play further games against Dartford FC and Forest Green Rovers, coming on as a sub in both matches. Creighton's first start since August game in the FA Trophy against Gresley F.C., but after 20 minutes he picked up a recurring hamstring injury and was replaced by Kyle Parle. This proved to be Creighton's last match in professional football. He announced his retirement from playing on 23 December 2013. He made 78 league appearances scoring four times for Wrexham in the league, and made 89 Reds appearances in all competitions and 258 league appearances in his professional career scoring 9 times.

== Managerial career ==
=== Southport ===
Creighton joined Southport on 26 August 2016, as assistant manager to former Wrexham teammate Andy Bishop.

== Honours ==
Oxford United

- Conference Premier play-offs: 2009–10

Wrexham

- FA Trophy: 2012–13
