= Simon Clist =

English footballer

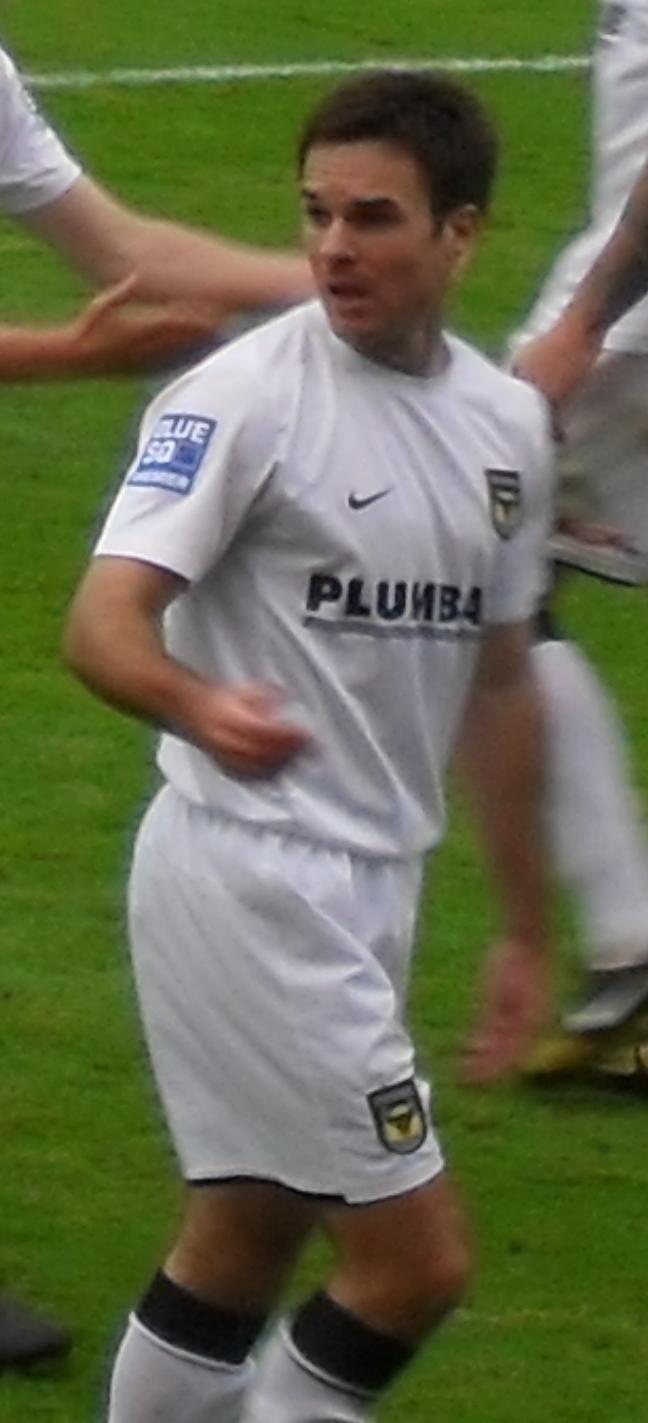
- Clist in 2009

Personal information
- Full name: Simon James Clist
- Date of birth: 13 June 1981 (age 45)
- Place of birth: Bournemouth, England
- Height: 5 ft 9 in (1.75 m)
- Position: Midfielder

Senior career*
| Years | Team | Apps | (Gls) |
| 1999–2004 | Bristol City | 71 | (6) |
| 2003 | → Torquay United (loan) | 11 | (2) |
| 2004–2006 | Barnet | 68 | (1) |
| 2006–2009 | Forest Green Rovers | 105 | (11) |
| 2009–2012 | Oxford United | 80 | (9) |
| 2011 | → Hereford United (loan) | 19 | (0) |
| 2012–2013 | Hereford United | 25 | (0) |
| Total | | 379 | (29) |
- * Club domestic league appearances and goals

Simon James Clist (born 13 June 1981) is an English footballer who plays as a midfielder. He began his career at Tottenham Hotspur and went on to play for Bristol City, Torquay United, Barnet, Hereford United, Oxford United and Forest Green Rovers.

== Career ==
Born in Bournemouth, Dorset, Clist began his career as a trainee with Tottenham Hotspur as a TYS before transferring to Bristol City, turning professional in July 1999. His first-team debut came on 25 January 2000, in the Football League Trophy game at home to AFC Bournemouth (a 1–1 draw). His league debut came four days later in a goalless draw away to Bury. He was one five players transfer-listed by City manager Danny Wilson in April 2002 after City had failed to reach the end-of-season promotion play-offs.

He joined Torquay United on loan on 20 February 2003, playing 11 times and scoring twice as he stayed at Plainmoor until the end of the season.

Clist returned to Ashton Gate, but was again transfer-listed by City manager Wilson in August 2003. He left City in January 2004, joining Barnet on a free transfer, with a contract until the end of the season, when he was given a further contract for the following season. He helped Barnet to the Conference title in 2005, having switched from midfield to full-back, and signed a new 12-month contract in May 2005. He was released by Barnet in May 2006, and was signed by Gary Owers for Forest Green Rovers later that month, having been a trainee at Bristol City, while Owers was a player there. Clist played at Forest Green making over 100 appearances whilst being involved in some of the club's most successful seasons in its history including cup runs and record high league finishes.

He signed for Oxford United on 2 February 2009 on the last day of the transfer window for a nominal fee. On 18 August 2011 he was loaned to Hereford United until 3 January 2012, linking up with his former Forest Green Rovers teammate Jamie Pitman who managed Hereford. Clist made his Hereford debut in a 1–1 away draw with AFC Wimbledon on 20 August 2011. He signed for the Bulls on a permanent basis, signing an 18-month deal in January 2012 after leaving Oxford United.

After not featuring for the final four months of the campaign, Clist was released by Hereford United at the end of the 2012–13 season.

== Honours ==
Barnet

- Conference National: 2004–05

Oxford United

- Conference Premier play-offs: 2009–10
