= 2011–12 Oxford United F.C. season =

English football club season

Oxford United
2011–12 season
- Chairman: Kelvin Thomas
- Manager: Chris Wilder
- Stadium: Kassam Stadium
- Football League Two: 9th
- FA Cup: 1st Round
- League Cup: 1st Round
- Football League Trophy: 3rd Round
- Top goalscorer: League: James Constable (11); All: James Constable (11)
- Highest home attendance: 11,825 (v Swindon Town 3 March 2012 (Football League Two))
- Lowest home attendance: 5,435 (v Cardiff City 10 August 2011 (Football League Cup))

Oxford United F.C. season 2011–12 was the club's second season in League Two after returning from the Conference. It was the club's 118th year in existence, their 112th of competitive football and their 63rd since turning professional. This article covers the period from 1 July 2011 to 30 June 2012.

After consolidation of the club's newly regained League status the season before (Oxford had finished 12th in League Two in 2010–11), and an unbeaten pre-season campaign that included victories over higher-division opposition in the shape of MK Dons and Birmingham City, hopes for the new season were high, but United started with an away defeat to Rotherham United on the opening day. Results improved, however, and the club briefly reached the automatic promotion places in October. They spent most of the remainder of the season in the playoff places, but a seven-match winless streak at the end of the season meant they finished outside of the playoffs in 9th place, a pattern that was to be repeated for the following two seasons under manager Chris Wilder. Doing the double (victories home and away) over local rivals Swindon Town, the eventual League champions, for the first time since 1973 offered some consolation to the Oxford United faithful. A long-range goal from midfielder Peter Leven in a home victory over Port Vale in October was another highlight of the season.

United were eliminated in the first round of both major cup competitions by higher-division opposition: League One side Sheffield United in the FA Cup and Cardiff City of the Championship in the League Cup. James Constable was the club's leading scorer for the fourth consecutive season, with 11 goals, but this was to be his least prolific season at the club.

== Team kit ==
This season's team kit supplier is the American brand Nike, via JustSport, with this season being the third in a three-year deal. The club's main sponsor for the 2011–12 season is Bridle Insurance, an Oxfordshire-based insurance company.

Home colours	Away colours	Home goalkeeper

== Match fixtures and results ==
=== Pre-season friendlies ===
==== July ====
9 July 2011	Didcot Town	0–6	Oxford United	Loop Meadow Stadium, Didcot
15:00			Pittman; Payne; Potter; Smalley; Woodley

14 July 2011	Seacoast United	1–1	Oxford United	Bill Ball Stadium, Exeter, New Hampshire
00:00	Palumbo 20' (pen.)		Potter 4'

16 July 2011	Mass United	0–2	Oxford United	William Ball Stadium, Exeter, New Hampshire
20:00			Potter 22'; Smalley 51'

18 July 2011	Seacoast United	1–3	Oxford United	Bill Ball Stadium, Exeter, New Hampshire
00:00	Barima 41'		Pittman 18'; Smalley 50', 54'

23 July 2011	Oxford United	1–0	Milton Keynes Dons	Kassam Stadium, Oxford
15:00	Hall 20'			Attendance: 1,751

26 July 2011	Oxford United	2–0	Birmingham City	Kassam Stadium, Oxford
19:45	James 60'; Potter 80'			Attendance: 2,743

27 July 2011	Brackley Town	0–1	Oxford United	St. James Park, Brackley
19:30			Woodley 70'

29 July 2011	Oxford United	1–0	Everton XI	Kassam Stadium, Oxford
19:45	Constable 55'			Attendance: 2,461

=== League Two ===
For more information on this season's Football League Two, see 2011–12 Football League Two. Oxford United's home games are played at the Kassam Stadium

==== Results ====
===== August =====
6 August 2011 1	Rotherham United	1–0	Oxford United	Don Valley Stadium, Rotherham
15:00	Grabban 48'	BBC Sport		Attendance: 4,485

13 August 2011 2	Oxford United	1–1	Bradford City	Kassam Stadium, Oxford
15:00	Heslop 29'	BBC Sport	Hannah 78'	Attendance: 6,523

16 August 2011 3	Oxford United	2–0	Shrewsbury Town	Kassam Stadium, Oxford
19:45	Heslop 8'; Guy 52'	BBC Sport		Attendance: 6,102

21 August 2011 4	Swindon Town	1–2	Oxford United	County Ground, Swindon
13:00	Ritchie 20'	BBC Sport	Constable 12' 43'	Attendance: 12,113

27 August 2011 5	Oxford United	1–1	Aldershot Town	Kassam Stadium, Oxford
15:00	Constable 21'	BBC Sport	Guttridge 66'	Attendance: 6,673

===== September =====
3 September 2011 6	Crewe Alexandra	3–1	Oxford United	Alexandra Stadium, Crewe
15:00	Miller 30', 37'; Leitch-Smith 65'	BBC Sport	Davis 77'	Attendance: 3,680

10 September 2011 7	Oxford United	2–2	Burton Albion	Kassam Stadium, Oxford
15:00	Potter 45+2'; Leven 53'	BBC Sport	Richards 55' (pen.) 66'	Attendance: 8,043

13 September 2011 8	Dagenham & Redbridge	0–1	Oxford United	Victoria Road, Dagenham
19:45		BBC Sport	R. Hall 41'	Attendance: 1,921

17 September 2011 9	Barnet	0–2	Oxford United	Underhill Stadium, Barnet
15:00		BBC Sport	Heslop 33' Davis 38'	Attendance: 2,812

24 September 2011 10	Oxford United	1–1	Accrington Stanley	Kassam Stadium, Oxford
15:00	McLaren 35'	BBC Sport	Murphy 62'	Attendance: 6,472

===== October =====
1 October 2011 11	Hereford United	0–1	Oxford United	Edgar Street, Hereford
15:00		BBC Sport	R. Hall 32'	Attendance: 2,502

8 October 2011 12	Oxford United	3–0	Bristol Rovers	Kassam Stadium, Oxford
15:00	Constable 16', 84', Leven 32' (pen.)	BBC Sport		Attendance: 9,291

15 October 2011 13	Macclesfield Town	1–1	Oxford United	Moss Rose, Macclesfield
15:00	Tony Diagne 60'	BBC Sport	R. Hall 90+4'	Attendance: 2,293

22 October 2011 14	Gillingham	1–0	Oxford United	Priestfield Stadium, Gillingham
15:00	Montrose 45'	BBC Sport		Attendance: 5,819

25 October 2011 15	Oxford United	5–1	Plymouth Argyle	Kassam Stadium, Oxford
19:45	R Hall 15' 67' Constable 71', 90+3', Leven 77'	BBC Sport	Walton 55' (pen.)	Attendance: 7,802

29 October 2011 16	Oxford United	2–1	Port Vale	Kassam Stadium, Oxford
15:00	Duberry 11' Leven 64'	BBC Sport	Richards 62'	Attendance: 8,027

===== November =====
5 November 2011 17	Southend	2–1	Oxford United	Roots Hall, Southend-on-Sea
15:00	Phillips 45+2'; Hall 67'	BBC Sport	Batt 62'	Attendance: 6,157

19 November 2011 18	Crawley Town	4–1	Oxford United	Broadfield Stadium, Crawley
15:00	Barnett 4' 14'; Drury 45+3' Howell 52'	BBC Sport	Constable 30'	Attendance: 4,042

26 November 2011 19	Oxford United	1–3	Cheltenham Town	Kassam Stadium, Oxford
15:00	Leven 82'	BBC Sport	Jombati 8'; Spencer 56'; Mohamed 86'	Attendance: 8,037

===== December =====
10 December 2011 20	Morecambe	0–0	Oxford United	Globe Arena, Morecambe
15:00		BBC Sport		Attendance: 1,914

17 December 2011 21	Oxford United	2–0	Northampton Town	Kassam Stadium, Oxford
15:00	Craddock 50' Smalley 87'	BBC Sport		Attendance: 7,517

26 December 2011 22	AFC Wimbledon	0–2	Oxford United	Kingsmeadow, Kingston upon Thames
12:15		BBC Sport	Constable 18' A Hall 44'	Attendance: 4,547

31 December 2011 23	Torquay United	0–0	Oxford United	Plainmoor, Torquay
13:00		BBC Sport		Attendance: 3,043

===== January =====
2 January 2012 24	Oxford United	1–1	Crawley Town	Kassam Stadium, Oxford
15:00	Pittman 55'	BBC Sport	Barnett 90'	Attendance: 9,004

7 January 2012 25	Aldershot Town	0–3	Oxford United	Recreation Ground, Aldershot
15:00		BBC Sport	Pittman 8', Duberry 38', Leven 45+3'	Attendance: 3,194

14 January 2012 26	Oxford United	0–1	Crewe Alexandra	Kassam Stadium, Oxford
15:00		BBC Sport	Pearson 89'	Attendance: 7,052

21 January 2012 27	Oxford United	2–2	Hereford United	Kassam Stadium, Oxford
15:00	Pittman 12' Duberry 90'	BBC Sport	Duberry 32' (o.g.) 86' (o.g.)	Attendance: 6,630

29 January 2012 28	Burton Albion	1–1	Oxford United	Pirelli Stadium, Burton-on-Trent
15:00	Bolder 13'	BBC Sport	Potter 59'	Attendance: 3,189

===== February =====
14 February 2012 29	Oxford United	2–1	Dagenham & Redbridge	Kassam Stadium, Oxford
19:45	Johnson 51', Constable 79'	BBC Sport	Arber 72'	Attendance: 5,653

18 February 2012 30	Bristol Rovers	0–0	Oxford United	Memorial Stadium, Bristol
15:00		BBC Sport		Attendance: 6,512

21 February 2012 31	Oxford United	2–1	Barnet	Kassam Stadium, Oxford
19:45	Rendell 43', Constable 56'	BBC Sport	Hector 16'	Attendance: 5,848

25 February 2012 32	Oxford United	1–1	Macclesfield	Kassam Stadium, Oxford
15:00	Johnson 42'	BBC Sport	Duberry 9' (o.g.)	Attendance: 6,189

===== March =====
3 March 2012 33	Oxford United	2–0	Swindon Town	Kassam Stadium, Oxford
12:00	A Hall 16', Johnson 18'	BBC Sport		Attendance: 11,825

6 March 2012 34	Shrewsbury Town	2–2	Oxford United	New Meadow, Shrewsbury
19:45	Wright 54' Richards 90'	BBC Sport	Holmes 1', 38'	Attendance: 5,205

10 March 2012 35	Bradford City	2–1	Oxford United	Valley Parade, Bradford
15:00	Fagan 57' Hanson 67'	BBC Sport	A Hall 72'	Attendance: 10,059

17 March 2012 36	Oxford United	2–1	Rotherham United	Kassam Stadium, Oxford
15:00	Rendell 45', A Hall 52'	BBC Sport	Grabban 83' (pen.)	Attendance: 6,756

20 March 2012 37	Oxford United	1–0	AFC Wimbledon	Kassam Stadium, Oxford
19:45	Morgan 57'	BBC Sport		Attendance: 6,366

24 March 2012 38	Cheltenham Town	0–0	Oxford United	Whaddon Road, Cheltenham
15:00		BBC Sport		Attendance: 4,365

27 March 2012 39	Accrington Stanley	0–2	Oxford United	Crown Ground, Accrington
19:45		BBC Sport	A Hall 42', 73'	Attendance: 1,408

31 March 2012 40	Oxford United	1–2	Morecambe	Kassam Stadium, Oxford
15:00	Rendell 5'	BBC Sport	Curran 3' Drummond 74'	Attendance: 7,023

===== April =====
6 April 2012 41	Northampton Town	2–1	Oxford United	Sixfields Stadium, Northampton
19:45	Guttridge 1' Williams 90'	BBC Sport	Montaño 50'	Attendance: 6,860

9 April 2012 42	Oxford United	2–2	Torquay United	Kassam Stadium, Oxford
15:00	Chapman 59' Montaño 68'	BBC Sport	Howe 17' Atieno 90'	Attendance: 7,867

16 April 2012 43	Oxford United	0–0	Gillingham	Kassam Stadium, Oxford
15:00		BBC Sport		Attendance: 7,322

21 April 2012 44	Plymouth Argyle	1–1	Oxford United	Home Park, Plymouth
15:00	Williams 2'	BBC Sport	Hall 36'	Attendance: 8,668

28 April 2012 45	Oxford United	0–2	Southend United	Kassam Stadium, Oxford
15:00		BBC Sport	Hall 19' Mohsni 31'	Attendance: 9,356

===== May =====
5 May 2012 46	Port Vale	3–0	Oxford United	Vale Park, Stoke-on-Trent
15:00	Richard 41' Rigg 69' Williamson 90'	BBC Sport		Attendance: 5,621

==== Results summary ====
Overall								Home						Away					
Pld	W	D	L	GF	GA	GD	Pts	W	D	L	GF	GA	GD	W	D	L	GF	GA	GD
46	17	17	12	59	48	+11	68	10	9	4	36	24	+12	7	8	8	23	24	−1

Last updated: 5 May.
Source: BBC Sport

==== Results by round ====
Round	1	2	3	4	5	6	7	8	9	10	11	12	13	14	15	16	17	18	19	20	21	22	23	24	25	26	27	28	29	30	31	32	33	34	35	36	37	38	39	40	41	42	43	44	45	46
Ground	A	H	H	A	H	A	H	A	A	H	A	H	A	A	H	H	A	A	H	A	H	A	A	H	A	H	H	A	H	A	H	H	H	A	A	H	H	A	A	H	A	H	H	A	H	A
Result	L	D	W	W	D	L	D	W	W	D	W	W	D	L	W	W	L	L	L	D	W	W	D	D	W	L	D	D	W	D	W	D	W	D	L	W	W	D	W	L	L	D	D	D	L	L
Position	23	20	11	8	9	13	14	11	7	8	6	5	3	7	5	4	7	9	9	10	8	8	8	8	7	6	7	7	7	7	7	7	7	7	7	7	7	7	6	6	7	7	7	8	8	9

Updated to match(es) played on 5 May 2012. Source: see below
A = Away; H = Home; W = Win; D = Draw; L = Loss

=== League table ===
Pos	Team	Pld	W	D	L	GF	GA	GD	Pts	Promotion, qualification or relegation
7	Crewe Alexandra (O, P)	46	20	12	14	67	59	+8	72	Qualification for League Two play-offs (Note: Four teams play for one spot and promotion to Football League One.)
8	Gillingham	46	20	10	16	79	62	+17	70	
9	Oxford United	46	17	17	12	59	48	+11	68	
10	Rotherham United	46	18	13	15	67	63	+4	67	
11	Aldershot Town	46	19	9	18	54	52	+2	66	

Updated to match(es) played on 5 May 2012. Source: BBC Sport
Rules for classification: 1) Points; 2) Goal difference; 3) Number of goals scored
(O) Play-off winners; (P) Promoted

=== FA Cup ===
12 November 2011 1st	Sheffield United	3–0	Oxford United	Bramall Lane
15:00	Evans 12' 19' Flynn 71'	BBC Sport		Attendance: 7,991

=== Football League Cup ===
10 August 2011 1st	Oxford United	1–3 (a.e.t.)	Cardiff City	Kassam Stadium
19:45	Clist 30'	BBC Sport	Conway 12'; Whittingham 98'; Jarvis 120+1'	Attendance: 5,435

=== Football League Trophy ===
1st	Bye

4 October 2011 2nd	Aldershot Town	1–2	Oxford United	Recreation Ground
19:45	R Hall 49' Smalley 52'	BBC Sport	Hylton 76'	Attendance: 1,429

8 November 2011 QF	Oxford United	0–1	Southend United	Kassam Stadium, Oxford
19:45		BBC Sport	Hall 15'	Attendance: 2,415

=== Oxfordshire Senior Cup ===
31 January 2012 QF	North Leigh	4–1	Oxford United	Eynsham Hall Sports Park, North Leigh
19:45	Hole, Osbourne-Rickett, Hopkins, Willoughby	Oxford United	og	Attendance: 245

== Squad statistics ==
=== Appearances and goals ===
As of 5 May 2012

No.	Pos	Nat	Player	Total		League Two		FA Cup		League Cup		JP Trophy	
No.	Pos	Nat	Player	Apps	Goals	Apps	Goals	Apps	Goals	Apps	Goals	Apps	Goals
1	GK	(England) ENG	Ryan Clarke	44	0	42+0	0	1+0	0	1+0	0	0+0	0
2	DF	(England) ENG	Damian Batt	44	1	34+6	1	1+0	0	1+0	0	2+0	0
3	DF	(England) ENG	Anthony Tonkin	14	0	6+8	0	0+0	0	0+0	0	0+0	0
4	MF	(England) ENG	Paul McLaren	21	1	16+2	1	1+0	0	0+0	0	1+1	0
5	DF	(England) ENG	Michael Duberry	37	3	36+0	3	0+0	0	1+0	0	0+0	0
6	DF	(England) ENG	Jake Wright	47	0	43+0	0	1+0	0	1+0	0	2+0	0
7	MF	(Northern Ireland) NIR	Adam Chapman	14	1	10+4	1	0+0	0	0+0	0	0+0	0
8	MF	(England) ENG	Simon Heslop	29	3	25+1	3	1+0	0	0+0	0	2+0	0
9	FW	(England) ENG	James Constable	43	11	32+8	11	0+1	0	1+0	0	0+1	0
10	FW	(England) ENG	Deane Smalley	26	2	7+15	1	1+0	0	0+1	0	2+0	1
11	FW	(England) ENG	Jon-Paul Pittman	16	3	6+9	3	0+0	0	1+0	0	0+0	0
14	MF	(England) ENG	Asa Hall	38	7	24+10	7	1+0	0	1+0	0	2+0	0
15	MF	(England) ENG	Alfie Potter	26	2	20+4	2	0+0	0	1+0	0	1+0	0
16	DF	(England) ENG	Andy Whing	45	0	36+5	0	1+0	0	1+0	0	1+1	0
17	DF	(Northern Ireland) NIR	Tony Capaldi	1	0	1+0	0	0+0	0	0+0	0	0+0	0
18	FW	(England) ENG	Dean Morgan	10	1	10+0	1	0	0	0+0	0	0+0	0
19	FW	(England) ENG	Oli Johnson	17	3	8+9	3	0	0	0+0	0	0+0	0
20	MF	(Scotland) SCO	Peter Leven	42	6	36+3	6	1+0	0	0+1	0	1+0	0
21	GK	(England) ENG	Wayne Brown	4	0	2+0	0	0+0	0	0+0	0	2+0	0
22	DF	(England) ENG	Harry Worley	12	0	6+4	0	0+1	0	0+0	0	1+0	0
23	FW	(England) ENG	Scott Rendell	17	3	14+3	3	0	0	0+0	0	0	0
24	MF	(England) ENG	Mark Wilson	7	0	4+3	0	0	0	0+0	0	0	0
26	MF	(England) ENG	Liam Davis	46	2	41+3	2	0+0	0	1+0	0	1+0	0
27	FW	(Colombia) COL	Cristian Montaño	9	2	6+3	2	0	0	0	0	0	0
29	FW	(England) ENG	Tom Craddock	9	1	5+3	1	0+0	0	0+0	0	0+1	0
Players no longer at the club:
—	MF	(England) ENG	Simon Clist	1	1	0+0	0	0+0	0	1+0	1	0+0	0
—	DF	(Scotland) SCO	Steven Kinniburgh	3	0	0+1	0	1+0	0	0+0	0	1+0	0
—	MF	(England) ENG	Josh Payne	9	0	2+4	0	0+1	0	0+0	0	1+1	0
Loan players no longer at the club:
27	MF	(England) ENG	Lee Holmes	7	2	5+2	2	0	0	0+0	0	0	0
28	FW	(England) ENG	Jonathan Franks	3	0	0+1	0	1+0	0	0+0	0	1+0	0
30	FW	(England) ENG	Robert Hall	14	6	11+2	5	0+0	0	0+0	0	1+0	1
31	FW	(England) ENG	Lewis Guy	9	1	8+0	1	0+0	0	0+1	0	0+0	0
33	FW	(England) ENG	Danny Philliskirk	4	0	2+2	0	0+0	0	0+0	0	0+0	0
39	FW	(Algeria) ALG	Mehdi Kerrouche	4	0	1+3	0	0	0	0+0	0	0	0
	MF	(England) ENG	Andy Haworth	4	0	2+2	0	0+0	0	0+0	0	0+0	0
31	GK	(England) ENG	Connor Ripley	1	0	1+0	0	0+0	0	0+0	0	0	0
31	GK	(Argentina) ARG	Damián Martinez	1	0	1+0	0	0+0	0	0+0	0	0	0

=== Top scorers ===
As of 5 May 2012

Place	Position	Nation	Number	Name	League Two	FA Cup	League Cup	JP Trophy	Total
1	FW	(England)	9	James Constable	11	0	0	0	11
2	MF	(England)	14	Asa Hall	7	0	0	0	7
3	FW	(England)	30	Robert Hall	5	0	0	1	6
=	MF	(Scotland)	20	Peter Leven	6	0	0	0	6
5	DF	(England)	5	Michael Duberry	3	0	0	0	3
=	MF	(England)	8	Simon Heslop	3	0	0	0	3
=	FW	(England)	19	Oli Johnson	3	0	0	0	3
=	FW	(England)	15	Jon-Paul Pittman	3	0	0	0	3
=	FW	(England)	23	Scott Rendell	3	0	0	0	3
10	MF	(England)	26	Liam Davis	2	0	0	0	2
=	MF	(England)	27	Lee Holmes	2	0	0	0	2
=	MF	(Colombia)	27	Cristian Montaño	2	0	0	0	2
=	MF	(England)	11	Alfie Potter	2	0	0	0	2
=	FW	(England)	10	Deane Smalley	1	0	0	1	2
14	DF	(England)	2	Damian Batt	1	0	0	0	1
=	MF	(Northern Ireland)	7	Adam Chapman	1	0	0	0	1
=	MF	(England)	23	Simon Clist	0	0	1	0	1
=	FW	(England)	15	Tom Craddock	1	0	0	0	1
=	FW	(England)	27	Lewis Guy	1	0	0	0	1
=	MF	(England)	4	Paul McLaren	1	0	0	0	1
=	FW	(England)	18	Dean Morgan	1	0	0	0	1
				TOTALS	58	0	1	2	62

=== Disciplinary record ===
As of 5 May 2012

Number	Nation	Position	Name	League Two		FA Cup		League Cup		JP Trophy		Total	
Number	Nation	Position	Name	Yellow card	Red card	Yellow card	Red card	Yellow card	Red card	Yellow card	Red card	Yellow card	Red card
2	(England)	DF	Damian Batt	8	1	1	0	0	0	1	0	10	1
5	(England)	DF	Michael Duberry	6	1	0	0	1	0	0	0	7	1
6	(England)	DF	Jake Wright	6	1	0	0	0	0	0	0	6	1
9	(England)	FW	James Constable	5	1	0	0	0	0	0	0	5	1
26	(England)	MF	Liam Davis	4	1	0	0	0	0	0	0	4	1
29	(England)	FW	Tom Craddock	1	0	0	0	0	0	0	1	1	1
21	(England)	GK	Wayne Brown	0	0	0	0	0	0	0	1	0	1
16	(England)	DF	Andy Whing	9	0	0	0	0	0	0	0	9	0
14	(England)	MF	Asa Hall	5	0	0	0	0	0	0	0	5	0
19	(England)	FW	Oli Johnson	4	0	0	0	0	0	0	0	4	0
20	(Scotland)	MF	Peter Leven	4	0	0	0	0	0	0	0	4	0
8	(England)	MF	Simon Heslop	2	0	0	0	0	0	1	0	3	0
1	(England)	GK	Ryan Clarke	2	0	0	0	0	0	0	0	2	0
30	(England)	FW	Robert Hall	2	0	0	0	0	0	0	0	2	0
31	(England)	MF	Andy Haworth	2	0	0	0	0	0	0	0	2	0
27	(England)	MF	Lee Holmes	2	0	0	0	0	0	0	0	2	0
4	(England)	MF	Paul McLaren	2	0	0	0	0	0	0	0	2	0
11	(England)	FW	Jon-Paul Pittman	2	0	0	0	0	0	0	0	2	0
15	(England)	MF	Alfie Potter	2	0	0	0	0	0	0	0	2	0
23	(England)	FW	Scott Rendell	2	0	0	0	0	0	0	0	2	0
22	(England)	DF	Harry Worley	1	0	0	0	0	0	1	0	2	0
27	(England)	FW	Lewis Guy	1	0	0	0	0	0	0	0	1	0
39	(Algeria)	FW	Mehdi Kerrouche	1	0	0	0	0	0	0	0	1	0
27	(Colombia)	FW	Cristian Montaño	1	0	0	0	0	0	0	0	1	0
18	(England)	FW	Dean Morgan	1	0	0	0	0	0	0	0	1	0
33	(England)	FW	Danny Philliskirk	1	0	0	0	0	0	0	0	1	0
3	(England)	DF	Anthony Tonkin	1	0	0	0	0	0	0	0	1	0
			TOTALS	75	5	1	0	1	0	3	2	80	7

== Transfers ==
Players transferred in
Date	Pos.	Name	Previous club	Fee	Ref.
11 July 2011	MF	(Scotland) Peter Leven	(England) Milton Keynes Dons	Free	
28 July 2011	GK	(England) Wayne Brown	(South Africa) Supersport United	Free	
29 July 2011	MF	(England) Liam Davis	(England) Northampton Town	Free	
20 January 2012	FW	(England) Oli Johnson	(England) Norwich City	Free	
31 January 2012	MF	(England) Mark Wilson	(England) Doncaster Rovers	Free	
22 May 2012	MF	(England) Sean Rigg	(England) Port Vale	Undisc	
Players transferred out
Date	Pos.	Name	To	Fee	Ref.
1 July 2011	DF	(France) Djoumin Sangaré	(England) Kettering Town		
1 July 2011	DF	(England) Mitchell Hanson	(England) Eastwood Town		
1 January 2012	FW	(England) Matt Green	(England) Mansfield Town		
3 January 2012	MF	(England) Simon Clist	(England) Hereford United		
24 January 2012	DF	(England) Ben Purkiss	(England) Hereford United		
27 January 2012	DF	(Scotland) Steven Kinniburgh	Released		
5 March 2012	MF	(England) Josh Payne	(England) Aldershot Town	Free	
Players loaned in
Date from	Pos.	Name	From	Date to	Ref.
9 August 2011	FW	(England) Lewis Guy	(England) Milton Keynes Dons	2 January 2012	
31 August 2011	FW	(England) Jonathan Franks	(England) Middlesbrough	1 January 2012	
12 September 2011	FW	(England) Robert Hall	(England) West Ham United	14 January 2012	
16 September 2011	MF	(England) Andy Haworth	(England) Bury	5 November 2011	
21 October 2011	FW	(England) Danny Philliskirk	(England) Sheffield United	n/k	
31 January 2012	FW	(England) Scott Rendell	(England) Wycombe Wanderers	end of season	
9 February 2012	FW	(Algeria) Mehdi Kerrouche	(England) Swindon Town	12 March 2012	
14 February 2012	MF	(England) Lee Holmes	(England) Southampton	14 March 2012	
8 March 2012	FW	(England) Dean Morgan	(England) Chesterfield	end of season	
16 March 2012	FW	(Colombia) Cristian Montaño	(England) West Ham	end of season	
Players loaned out
Date from	Pos.	Name	To	Date to	Ref.
22 July 2011	FW	(England) Matt Green	(England) Mansfield Town	31 December 2011	
5 August 2011	DF	(England) Ben Purkiss	(England) Darlington	9 November 2011	
12 August 2011	FW	(England) Aaron Woodley	(England) Banbury United	1 January 2012	
18 August 2011	MF	(England) Simon Clist	(England) Hereford United	3 January 2012	
12 September 2011	FW	(England) Jon-Paul Pittman	(England) Crawley Town	12 December 2011	
12 January 2012	MF	(England) Josh Payne	(England) Aldershot Town	5 March 2012	
19 January 2012	FW	(England) Deane Smalley	(England) Bradford City	end of season	
27 January 2012	MF	(Northern Ireland) Adam Chapman	(Wales) Newport County	27 February 2012	
