= Asa Hall =

English footballer (born 1986)

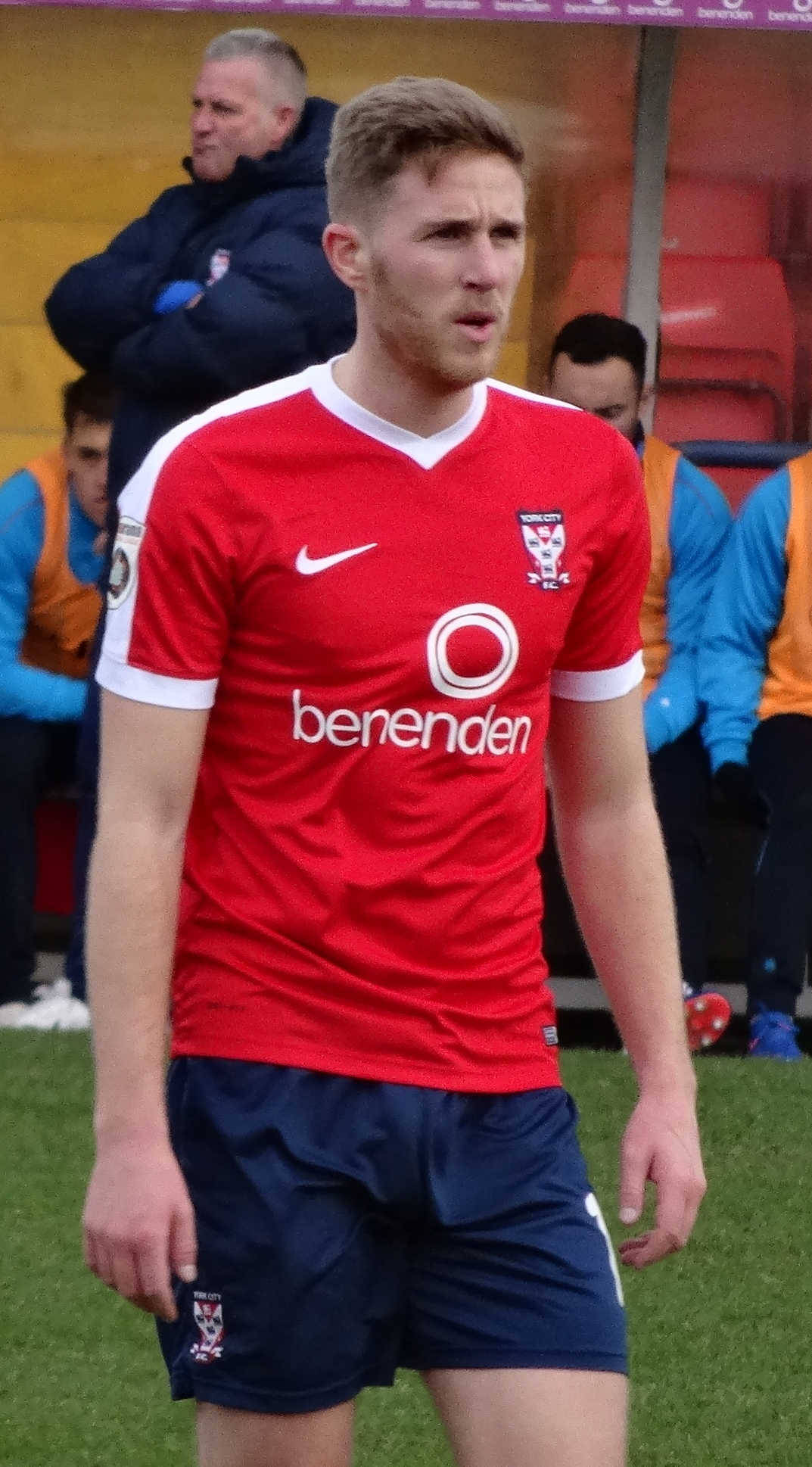
- Hall playing for York City in 2017

Personal information
- Full name: Asa Philip Hall
- Date of birth: 29 November 1986 (age 39)
- Place of birth: Dudley, England
- Height: 6 ft 2 in (1.88 m)
- Position: Midfielder

Team information
- Current team: Tiverton Town (player-manager)

Youth career
- Wolverhampton Wanderers
- –2004: Birmingham City

Senior career*
Years	Team	Apps	(Gls)
2004–2008	Birmingham City	0	(0)
2006	→ Boston United (loan)	12	(0)
2007	→ Ashford Town (Kent) (loan)	10	(1)
2008	→ Shrewsbury Town (loan)	15	(3)
2008–2010	Luton Town	74	(15)
2010–2012	Oxford United	75	(11)
2012–2014	Shrewsbury Town	32	(2)
2013	→ Aldershot Town (loan)	16	(0)
2013	→ Oxford United (loan)	19	(3)
2014–2017	Cheltenham Town	45	(3)
2017	→ York City (loan)	13	(1)
2017–2018	Barrow	37	(3)
2018–2024	Torquay United	174	(39)
2024–	Tiverton Town	35	(3)

International career
2005	England U19	1	(0)
2005	England U20	1	(0)

Managerial career
- 2025–: Tiverton Town (player-manager)
- * Club domestic league appearances and goals as of 13:46, 30 March 2025 (UTC)

Asa Philip Hall (born 29 November 1986) is an English professional footballer who plays as a midfielder for Southern League Division One South club Tiverton Town where he holds the role of player-manager.

Hall turned professional with Birmingham City, but never played for their first team. He went on to play in the Football League for Boston United, Shrewsbury Town (on loan), Luton Town and Oxford United before rejoining Shrewsbury Town in 2012. He spent time on loan at Aldershot Town and back at Oxford United in 2013.

He represented England at under-19 and under-20 level.

== Career ==
=== Birmingham City ===
Hall was born in Dudley, West Midlands. He played football in the youth system at Wolverhampton Wanderers before moving to Birmingham City, where he signed his first professional contract at the age of 17. By 18 he was a regular in the reserve team. Birmingham's Academy director Stewart Hall described him as "the outstanding prospect in the under-18 group" and he was expected to challenge for a first team place. In March 2005 he made his debut for England under-19s, and in May, he was named Birmingham's young player of the 2004–05 season. Later that year he played for England under-20s.

==== Loan spells ====
Hall made 12 appearances during three months spent on loan at League Two club Boston United in the 2005–06 season. He signed a one-year contract with Birmingham before the 2006–07 season, spent the last month of the season on loan at Ashford Town (Kent), and signed a further year's contract with Birmingham before the 2007–08 season.

In January 2008, Hall joined Shrewsbury Town of League Two on loan for the remainder of the season. He made his debut for the Shrews on 19 January against Morecambe, and scored the first goal in a 2–0 win. Hall was offered a permanent deal with Shrewsbury by their manager Gary Peters before his sacking in March. In May, when Hall was released by Birmingham, Peters' replacement Paul Simpson also offered him a contract. The player appeared keen to sign but eventually rejected the offer.

=== Luton Town ===
Hall signed for Luton Town in August 2008. He was a regular member of the first team, and helped the club reach the 2009 Football League Trophy Final, scoring in the penalty shoot-out to defeat Brighton & Hove Albion in the semi-final. The next season, Hall was again a regular player, though the arrival of Simon Heslop in March saw him demoted to the bench by new Luton manager Richard Money. Hall was released from his Luton contract at the end of the season, having made 89 appearances and scored 17 goals in his time at the club.

=== Oxford United ===
On 20 May 2010, Hall signed for Oxford United, newly promoted back to the Football League, on a two-year deal.

Hall decided not to renew his contract with Oxford, preferring to return nearer his Midlands home.

=== Shrewsbury Town ===
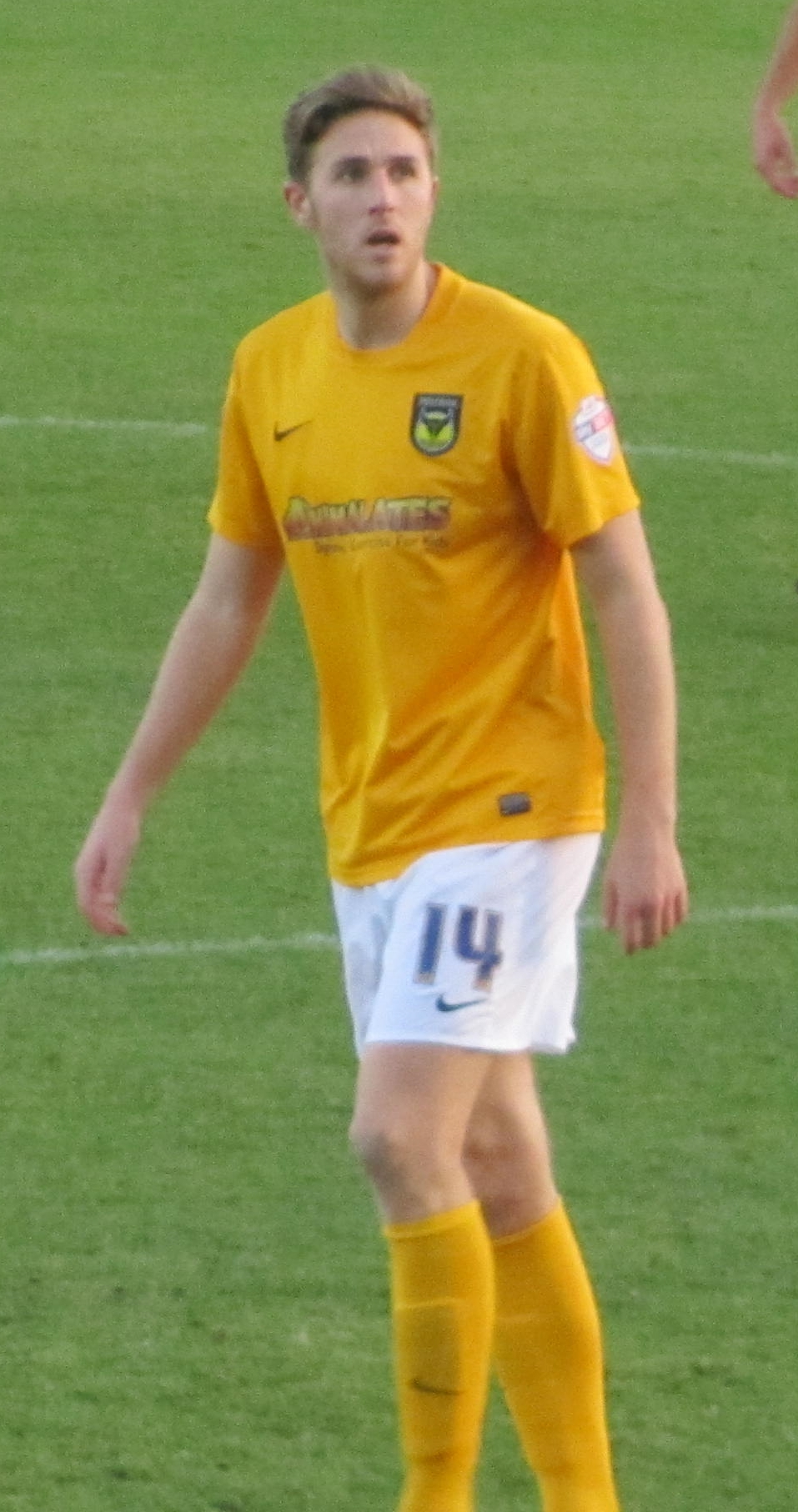
Hall playing for Oxford United in 2013

In May 2012, Hall agreed to rejoin Shrewsbury Town in July after his Oxford contract expired, and made his second Shrewsbury debut as a substitute in a League Cup match against Leeds United on 11 August. In February 2013 Hall moved to Aldershot Town on loan; he made 16 league appearances before returning to Shrewsbury at the end of the season. In May 2013, Shrewsbury manager Graham Turner said he intended to talk to Hall about his future with the club, and he was sent on another loan spell at Oxford United on 3 July.

Hall returned to Shrewsbury at the end of his loan in January 2014, with Turner indicating he was no longer part of his plans and was available for transfer. Despite this, he was allocated a squad number and appeared as a substitute in Shrewsbury's next match against Leyton Orient. With Turner departing the club later that month, Hall expressed his desire to stay at Shrewsbury and fight for his place, despite interest from his former Oxford manager Chris Wilder to sign him at his new club Northampton Town.

Following Shrewsbury's relegation, Hall was released at the end of his contract.

=== Cheltenham Town ===
On 28 May 2014, Hall signed for League Two club Cheltenham Town on a two-year contract. He tore his calf four minutes into his debut, and complications from that injury kept him out for a year.

On 23 February 2017, Hall joined National League club York City on a one-month loan. On 21 May 2017, he started as York beat Macclesfield Town 3–2 at Wembley Stadium in the 2017 FA Trophy Final. Hall was released by Cheltenham at the end of 2016–17.

=== Barrow ===
Hall signed for National League club Barrow on 23 June 2017. He was made available for transfer at the end of the 2017–18 season.

=== Torquay United ===
Hall signed for newly relegated National League South club Torquay United on 21 June 2018.

=== Tiverton Town ===
Hall signed for Tiverton Town in June 2024. He briefly took on the role of interim manager alongside fellow Tiverton Town player Niall Thompson after the sacking of Leigh Robinson and Ben Gerring.

In March 2025, Hall was appointed player-manager on a deal until the end of the season.

== Career statistics ==
As of match played 28 March 2025

Appearances and goals by club, season and competition
Club	Season	League			FA Cup		League Cup		Other		Total	
Club	Season	Division	Apps	Goals	Apps	Goals	Apps	Goals	Apps	Goals	Apps	Goals
Birmingham City	2005–06	Premier League	0	0	0	0	0	0	—		0	0
Boston United (loan)	2005–06	League Two	12	0	—		—		—		12	0
Ashford Town (Kent) (loan)	2006–07	Isthmian League Division One South	10	1	—		—		—		10	1
Shrewsbury Town (loan)	2007–08	League Two	15	3	—		—		—		15	3
Luton Town	2008–09	League Two	42	10	2	0	2	0	5 (Note: Appearance(s) in Football League Trophy)	1	51	11
Luton Town	2009–10	Conference Premier	32	5	5	1	—		1 (Note: Appearance in Conference Premier play-offs)	0	38	6
Luton Town	Total		74	15	7	1	2	0	6	1	89	17
Oxford United	2010–11	League Two	41	4	1	0	2	0	0	0	44	4
Oxford United	2011–12	League Two	34	7	1	0	1	0	2	0	38	7
Oxford United	Total		75	11	2	0	3	0	2	0	82	11
Shrewsbury Town	2012–13	League One	15	2	1	0	1	0	1	1	18	3
Shrewsbury Town	2013–14	League One	17	0	—		—		—		17	0
Shrewsbury Town	Total		32	2	1	0	1	0	1	1	35	3
Aldershot Town (loan)	2012–13	League Two	16	0	—		—		—		16	0
Oxford United (loan)	2013–14	League Two	19	3	0	0	1	0	1	0	21	3
Cheltenham Town	2014–15	League Two	1	0	0	0	0	0	0	0	1	0
Cheltenham Town	2015–16	National League	34	2	2	0	—		1 (Note: Appearance(s) in FA Trophy)	0	37	2
Cheltenham Town	2016–17	League Two	10	1	0	0	1	0	2 (Note: Appearance in EFL Trophy)	0	13	1
Cheltenham Town	Total		45	3	2	0	1	0	3	0	51	3
York City (loan)	2016–17	National League	13	1	—		—		3	0	16	1
Barrow	2017–18	National League	37	3	0	0	—		1	0	38	3
Torquay United	2018–19	National League South	32	6	3	1	—		1	0	36	7
Torquay United	2019–20	National League	19	4	0	0	—		1	0	20	4
Torquay United	2020–21	National League	38	10	2	3	—		4 (Note: Two appearances and one goal in FA Trophy, two appearances and one goal in National League play-offs)	2	44	15
Torquay United	2021–22	National League	30	6	0	0	—		0	0	30	6
Torquay United	2022–23	National League	30	8	4	1	—		0	0	34	9
Torquay United	2023–24	National League South	25	5	1	0	—		2	0	28	5
Torquay United	Total		174	39	10	5	—		8	2	192	46
Tiverton Town	2024–25	Southern League; Premier Division South	35	3	1	0	—		1	0	37	3
Career total			557	84	23	6	8	0	26	4	614	94

== Honours ==
Luton Town

- Football League Trophy: 2008–09

Cheltenham Town

- National League: 2015–16

York City

- FA Trophy: 2016–17

Individual

- National League South Team of the Year: 2018–19
