= 2013–14 Oxford United F.C. season =

English football club season

Oxford United
2013–14 season
- Chairman: Ian Lenagan
- Manager: Chris Wilder (until 25 January 2014); Mickey Lewis (caretaker); Gary Waddock (from 22 March 2014)
- Stadium: Kassam Stadium
- Football League Two: 8th
- FA Cup: Third round
- League Cup: First round
- Football League Trophy: Second round
- Top goalscorer: League: James Constable (10); All: Constable (12)
- Highest home attendance: 10,049 (v Plymouth Argyle 26 December 2013 (Football League Two))
- Lowest home attendance: 3,114 (v Gateshead 9 November 2013 (FA Cup))

The 2013–14 season was Oxford United's fourth season in League Two after returning from the Conference. They finished 8th in the League, one place better than the previous season but again failing to secure a play-off place after a promising start.

In the first half of the season Oxford led the table several times and were rarely outside the automatic promotion places, mainly thanks to an impressive points haul away from home (they were the last team in the top four divisions to be beaten away from home, not losing an away match in the league until defeat at Newport County in February). On 25 January 2014, with the club faltering though still in the play-off places, Chris Wilder resigned as manager to take up the reins at relegation-threatened Northampton Town. Mickey Lewis subsequently became the caretaker manager for a second time for the club. On 22 March 2014, Gary Waddock was appointed the head coach of the club after a lengthy interview process, leaving his job as Head of Coaching at MK Dons. Neither Lewis nor Waddock managed to halt the Us' loss of form and they slipped out of the play-off places in the final few weeks of the season, losing 11 of their last 15 league fixtures and finishing a disappointing eighth in the table, 9 points off the last play-off place.

United were knocked out of both the League Cup and FA Cup by Championship side Charlton Athletic. At half-time in the FA Cup 3rd round an upset had seemed likely when Oxford were beating their higher-division opponents 2–0, but they conceded two goals to the home side in the second half and were beaten 3–0 in the subsequent replay at the Kassam Stadium.

It was the club's 120th year in existence, their 114th of competitive football and their 65th since turning professional. This article covers the period from 1 July 2013 to 30 June 2014.

== Team kit ==
Home colours	Away colours	Home goalkeeper

== Match fixtures and results ==
=== Pre-season friendlies ===
6 July 2013	Ardley United	1–2	Oxford United	The Playing Fields, Ardley
15:00	Brooks 74' (pen.)	Report	Potter 48'; Smalley 90'	Attendance: 604

10 July 2013	Alloa Athletic	1–1	Oxford United	Recreation Park, Alloa
19:45	Ferns 90'	Report	Smalley 7'	Attendance: 245

13 July 2013	Berwick Rangers	1–2	Oxford United	Shielfield Park, Berwick-upon-Tweed
15:00	Morris 2'	Report	Hall 63' (pen.); Rigg 71'	Attendance: 247

20 July 2013	Oxford United	1–1	Birmingham City	Kassam Stadium
15:00	Smalley 25'	Report	McGurk 43'	Attendance: 2,394 (844 away)

23 July 2013	Oxford City	5–1	Oxford United	Court Place Farm, Oxford
19:30	Skendi 25', 34'; Benjamin 32'; Winters 39'; Green 76'	Report	Hall 3' (pen.)	Attendance: 1,005

27 July 2013	Oxford United	1–0	Coventry City	Kassam Stadium
15:00	Constable 46'	Report		Attendance: 1,557

29 July 2013	Truro City	1–1	Oxford United	Treyew Road, Truro
19:30	Cooke 57'	Report	O'Dowda 40'

=== League Two ===
For more information on this season's Football League Two, see 2013–14 Football League Two. Oxford United's home games are played at the Kassam Stadium.

==== Results ====
3 August 2013 1	Portsmouth	1–4	Oxford United	Fratton Park, Portsmouth
15:00	Agyemang 25'	Report	Smalley 34', 62'; Potter 38', 64'	Attendance: 18,181; Referee: Ward

10 August 2013 2	Oxford United	2–1	Bury	Kassam Stadium
15:00	Rose 34'; Mullins 82'	Report	Soares 70'	Attendance: 5,774; Referee: Linington

17 August 2013 3	Torquay United	1–3	Oxford United	Plainmoor, Torquay
15:00	Chapell 70'	Report	Smalley 49'; Constable 63'; Hall 77'	Attendance: 3,176; Referee: Gibbs

24 August 2013 4	Oxford United	2–2	Wycombe Wanderers	Kassam Stadium
15:00	Rose 51'; Mullins 96'	Report	Morgan 44' 59' (pen.)	Attendance: 7,100; Referee: D'Urso

31 August 2013 5	Oxford United	1–1	Rochdale	Kassam Stadium
15:00	Constable 24'	Report	Lund 51'	Attendance: 5,260; Referee: Graham

7 September 2013 6	Burton Albion	0–2	Oxford United	Pirelli Stadium, Burton-on-Trent
15:00		Report	Potter 49'; Rose 85'	Attendance: 3,416; Referee: Bull

14 September 2013 7	Cheltenham Town	2–2	Oxford United	Whaddon Road, Cheltenham
15:00	Harrison 8'; Gornell 51'	Report	Kitson 34'; Mullins 57'	Attendance: 3,906; Referee: Robinson

21 September 201 8	Oxford United	0–1	Chesterfield	Kassam Stadium
15:00		Report	Humphreys 30'	Attendance: 7,187; Referee: Kettle

28 September 2013 9	Hartlepool United	1–3	Oxford United	Victoria Park, Hartlepool
15:00	James 48'	Report	Williams 5'; Smalley 67'; Hall 90' (pen.)	Attendance: 3,799; Referee: Simpson

6 October 2013 10	Oxford United	0–2	Southend United	Kassam Stadium
15:00		Report	Clifford 14'; Prosser 30'	Attendance: 5,578; Referee: Steve Martin

12 October 2013 11	Oxford United	2–0	Northampton Town	Kassam Stadium
15:00	Constable 44'; Rose 45' (pen.)	Report		Attendance: 6,177; Referee: Darren Deadman

19 October 2013 12	Accrington Stanley	0–0	Oxford United	Crown Ground, Accrington
15:00		Report		Attendance: 1,476; Referee: Boyeson

22 October 2013 13	Oxford United	0–0	Exeter City	Kassam Stadium
19:45		Report		Attendance: 5,083; Referee: Stroud

26 October 2013 14	AFC Wimbledon	0–2	Oxford United	Kingsmeadow, Kingston upon Thames, London
15:00		Report	Constable 6'; Smalley 82' (pen.)	Attendance: 4,685; Referee: Whitestone

2 November 2013 15	Oxford United	0–1	Bristol Rovers	Kassam Stadium
15:00		Report	O'Toole 71' (pen.)	Attendance: 6,374; Referee: Brown

16 November 2013 16	Mansfield Town	1–3	Oxford United	Field Mill, Mansfield
15:00	Stevenson 45'	Report	Rigg 12'; Constable 45'; Williams 66'	Attendance: 3,831; Referee: Breakspear

23 November 2013 17	Oxford United	3–0	Morecambe F.C.	Kassam Stadium
15:00	Constable 16'; Rigg 25'; Williams 31'	Report		Attendance: 4,871; Referee: Sutton

26 November 2013 18	Oxford United	0–0	Newport County	Kassam Stadium
19:45		Report		Attendance: 5,042; Referee: Sheldrake

30 November 2013 19	Fleetwood Town	1–1	Oxford United	Highbury Stadium, Fleetwood
15:00	Schumacher 12'	Report	Kitson 89'	Attendance: 2,739; Referee: Bond

14 December 2013 20	Oxford United	2–1	Dagenham & Redbridge	Kassam Stadium
15:00	Constable 8'; Kitson 90'	Report	Murphy 45'	Attendance: 4,901; Referee: Heywood

21 December 2013 21	York City	0–0	Oxford United	Bootham Crescent, York
15:00		Report		Attendance: 3,526; Referee: Keith Hill

26 December 2013 22	Oxford United	2–3	Plymouth Argyle	Kassam Stadium
15:00	Hall 66'; Trotman 88' (o.g.)	Report	Lavery 46'; Reid 81' (pen.), 87'	Attendance: 10,049; Referee: Andy Davies

29 December 2013 23	Oxford United	0–2	Scunthorpe United	Kassam Stadium
15:00		Report	Burton 11'; Syers 72'	Attendance: 6,009; Referee: Andy Madley

11 January 2014 24	Oxford United	0–0	Portsmouth	Kassam Stadium
15:00		Report		Attendance: 8,443; Referee: Mark Heywood

18 January 2014 25	Wycombe Wanderers	0–1	Oxford United	Adams Park, High Wycombe
15:00		Report	Wroe 87'	Attendance: 5,751; Referee: Brendan Malone

25 January 2014 26	Oxford United	1–0	Torquay United	Kassam Stadium
15:00	Smalley 6'	Report		Attendance: 4,744; Referee: Carl Berry

28 January 2014 27	Exeter City	0–0	Oxford United	St James Park, Exeter
19:45		Report		Attendance: 2,798; Referee: Chris Sarginson

1 February 2014 28	Oxford United	2–1	AFC Wimbledon	Kassam Stadium
15:00	Newey 39'; Connolly 56'	Report	Wyke 75'	Attendance: 5,748; Referee: Andy D'Urso

4 February 2014 29	Bury	1–1	Oxford United	Gigg Lane, Bury
19:45	Jones 56'	Report	Ruffels 58'	Attendance: 2,303; Referee: Graham Horwood

8 February 2014 30	Bristol Rovers	1–1	Oxford United	Memorial Stadium, Bristol
15:00	O'Toole 84'	Report	Constable 10'	Attendance: 6,493; Referee: Lee Collins

15 February 2014 31	Oxford United	3–0	Mansfield Town	Kassam Stadium
15:00	Connolly 27'; Wroe 53'; Smalley 69'	Report		Attendance: 5,108; Referee: Fred Graham

18 February 2014 32	Newport County	3–2	Oxford United	Rodney Parade, Newport
19:45	Howe 45'; Burge 71'; Zebroski 83'	Report	Constable 14'; Potter 88'	Attendance: 3,757; Referee: Oliver Langford

22 February 2014 33	Morecambe	1–1	Oxford United	Globe Arena, Morecambe
15:00	Threlfall 90'	Report	Connolly 13'	Attendance: 1,614; Referee: David Webb

1 March 2014 34	Rochdale	3–0	Oxford United	Spotland, Rochdale
15:00	Hogan 45', 50', 62'	Report		Attendance: 3,429; Referee: Eddie Ilderton

8 March 2014 35	Oxford United	1–2	Burton Albion	Kassam Stadium
15:00	Williams 52'	Report	Knowles 10'; Ismail 26'	Attendance: 5,413; Referee: Andy Woolmer

11 March 2014 36	Oxford United	1–1	Cheltenham Town	Kassam Stadium
19:45	Williams 78'	Report	Cureton 84'	Attendance: 4,606; Referee: Tim Robinson

15 March 2014 37	Chesterfield	3–0	Oxford United	Proact Stadium, Chesterfield
15:00	Banks 8'; Roberts 16' (pen.), 90'	Report		Attendance: 6,246; Referee: Paul Tierney

21 March 2014 38	Oxford United	1–0	Hartlepool United	Kassam Stadium
19:45	Connolly 78'	Report		Attendance: 4,954; Referee: Andy Davies

24 March 2014 39	Southend United	3–0	Oxford United	Roots Hall, Southend-on-Sea
19:45	Atkinson 9'; Barnard 17' (pen.); Loza 86'	Report		Attendance: 6,078; Referee: Dean Whitestone

29 March 2014 40	Dagenham & Redbridge	1–0	Oxford United	Victoria Road, Dagenham
15:00	Howell 90'	Report		Attendance: 1,893; Referee: Trevor Kettle

5 April 2014 41	Oxford United	0–2	Fleetwood Town	Kassam Stadium
15:00		Report	Ball 34'; Sarcevic 52'	Attendance: 5,679; Referee: Brendan Malone

12 April 2014 42	Plymouth Argyle	0–2	Oxford United	Home Park, Plymouth
15:07		Report	Kitson 33'; Constable 63'	Attendance: 8,161; Referee: Mick Russell

18 April 2014 43	Oxford United	0–1	York City	Kassam Stadium
15:00		Report	Coulson 48' (pen.)	Attendance: 7,118; Referee: Oliver Langford

21 April 2014 44	Scunthorpe United	1–0	Oxford United	Glanford Park, Scunthorpe
15:00	Sparrow 15'	Report		Attendance: 5,241; Referee: Scott Mathieson

26 April 2014 45	Oxford United	1–2	Accrington Stanley	Kassam Stadium
15:00	Williams 67'	Report	Odejayi 18'; Gray 54'	Attendance: 5,022; Referee: Keith Hill

3 May 2014 46	Northampton Town	3–1	Oxford United	Sixfields Stadium, Northampton
15:00	Marquis 29'; Toney 33'; Kouo-Doumbé 51'	Report	Williams 7'	Attendance: 7,529; Referee: Scott Duncan

==== Results summary ====
Overall								Home						Away					
Pld	W	D	L	GF	GA	GD	Pts	W	D	L	GF	GA	GD	W	D	L	GF	GA	GD
46	16	14	16	53	50	+3	62	8	6	9	24	23	+1	8	8	7	29	27	+2

Last updated: 3 May 2014.
Source: BBC Sport

==== Results by round ====
Round	1	2	3	4	5	6	7	8	9	10	11	12	13	14	15	16	17	18	19	20	21	22	23	24	25	26	27	28	29	30	31	32	33	34	35	36	37	38	39	40	41	42	43	44	45	46
Ground	A	H	A	H	H	A	A	H	A	H	H	A	H	A	H	A	H	H	A	H	A	H	H	H	A	H	A	H	A	A	H	A	A	A	H	H	A	H	A	A	H	A	H	A	H	A
Result	W	W	W	D	D	W	D	L	W	L	W	D	D	W	L	W	W	D	D	W	D	L	L	D	W	W	D	W	D	D	W	L	D	L	L	D	L	W	L	L	L	W	L	L	L	L
Position	2	1	1	1	2	2	2	4	2	4	3	4	4	1	2	1	1	1	1	1	2	2	5	7	7	6	5	3	3	3	3	3	4	5	6	6	6	6	6	7	8	7	8	8	8	8

Updated to match(es) played on 3 May 2014 (UTC). Source: see below
A = Away; H = Home; W = Win; D = Draw; L = Loss

==== League table ====
Pos	Team	Pld	W	D	L	GF	GA	GD	Pts	Promotion, qualification or relegation
6	Burton Albion	46	19	15	12	47	42	+5	72	Qualification for League Two play-offs
7	York City	46	18	17	11	52	41	+11	71	Qualification for League Two play-offs
8	Oxford United	46	16	14	16	53	50	+3	62	
9	Dagenham & Redbridge	46	15	15	16	53	59	−6	60	
10	Plymouth Argyle	46	16	12	18	51	58	−7	60	

Updated to match(es) played on 3 May 2014. Source: BBC Sport
Rules for classification: 1) Points; 2) Goal difference; 3) Number of goals scored

=== FA Cup ===
9 November 2013 1	Oxford United	2–2	Gateshead	Kassam Stadium
15:00	Smalley 77'; Rose 90'	Report	Marwood 18'; Chandler 51'	Attendance: 3,114; Referee: Jeremy Simpson

6 December 2013 1R	Gateshead	0–1	Oxford United	Gateshead International Stadium, Gateshead
19:45		Report	Smalley 116' (pen.)	Attendance: 2,632; Referee: Paul Tierney

9 December 2013 2	Wrexham	1–2	Oxford United	Racecourse Ground, Wrexham
19:45	Clarke 29'	Report	Constable 54'; Williams 56'	Attendance: 2,906; Referee: Gavin Ward

14 January 2014 3	Charlton Athletic	2–2	Oxford United	The Valley
	Morrison 54'; Kermorgant 82'	Report	Mullins 13'; Davies 24'	Attendance: 5,566; Referee: Steve Martin

21 January 2014 3R	Oxford United	0–3	Charlton Athletic	Kassam Stadium
		Report	Kermorgant 35' 58'; Green 38'	Attendance: 3,225; Referee: David Coote

=== Football League Cup ===
6 August 2013 1	Charlton Athletic	4–0	Oxford United	The Valley, London
19:45	Church 18', 57'; Green 49'; Pigott 90' (pen.)	Report		Attendance: 4,935; Referee: Andy Davies

=== Football League Trophy ===
1	Bye

8 October 2013 2	Oxford United	1–2	Portsmouth	Kassam Stadium
19:45	Constable 90'	Report	Agyemang 66'; Marquis 83'	Attendance: 3,697; Referee: Iain Williamson

=== Oxfordshire Senior Cup ===
1	Bye

2	Bye

3	Bye

11 February 2014 QF	Thame United	0–2	Oxford United	ASM Stadium, Thame
19:45		Report	Aidan Hawtin (2)

9 April 2014 SF	Kidlington	0–0 (a.e.t.) (4–3 p)	Oxford United	Yarnton Road, Kidlington
		Report
	Penalties
			(penalty missed) Rose; (penalty scored) Josh Shama; (penalty missed) Marsh; (penalty scored) O'Dowda; (penalty scored) Bevans

== Squad statistics ==
=== Appearances and goals ===
As of 3 May 2014

No.	Pos	Nat	Player	Total		League Two		FA Cup		League Cup		JP Trophy	
No.	Pos	Nat	Player	Apps	Goals	Apps	Goals	Apps	Goals	Apps	Goals	Apps	Goals
1	GK	(England) ENG	Ryan Clarke	53	0	46	0	5	0	1	0	1	0
3	DF	(England) ENG	Tom Newey	48	1	41	1	5	0	1	0	1	0
4	DF	(England) ENG	Michael Raynes	30	0	24+2	0	3	0	0	0	1	0
6	DF	(England) ENG	Jake Wright	35	0	31	0	3	0	1	0	0	0
7	MF	(England) ENG	Sean Rigg	32	2	21+7	2	3	0	0+1	0	0	0
8	FW	(England) ENG	Dave Kitson	36	4	28+4	4	4	0	0	0	0	0
9	FW	(England) ENG	James Constable	50	12	35+9	10	4+1	1	0	0	1	1
10	FW	(England) ENG	Deane Smalley	39	9	24+8	7	3+2	2	0+1	0	0+1	0
11	MF	(England) ENG	Alfie Potter	26	4	16+8	4	0	0	0+1	0	1	0
13	DF	(England) ENG	David Hunt	53	0	46	0	5	0	1	0	1	0
14	MF	(England) ENG	Asa Hall	19	3	15+3	3	0	0	0	0	0+1	0
15	MF	(Australia) AUS	Ryan Williams	43	8	28+9	7	2+2	1	1	0	1	0
16	DF	(England) ENG	Andy Whing	20	0	18+1	0	0	0	1	0	0	0
17	MF	(England) ENG	Danny Rose	44	5	38+2	4	3	1	1	0	0	0
18	MF	(England) ENG	Scott Davies	26	1	8+12	0	5	1	0	0	1	0
19	DF	(England) ENG	Johnny Mullins	40	4	34	3	4	1	1	0	1	0
20	FW	(England) ENG	Tyrone Marsh	7	0	0+5	0	1+1	0	0	0	0	0
21	GK	(New Zealand) NZL	Max Crocombe	0	0	0	0	0	0	0	0	0	0
22	MF	(England) ENG	Nicky Wroe	18	2	17+1	2	0	0	0	0	0	0
24	MF	(England) ENG	David Connolly	16	4	8+8	4	0	0	0	0	0	0
25	GK	(England) ENG	Shwan Jalal	0	0	0	0	0	0	0	0	0	0
30	MF	(England) ENG	Sam Long	5	0	3	0	0+2	0	0	0	0	0
32	DF	(England) ENG	David Lynn	1	0	0	0	1	0	0	0	0	0
34	DF	(England) ENG	Matt Bevans	12	0	9+1	0	2	0	0	0	0	0
35	FW	(England) ENG	Callum O'Dowda	12	0	4+6	0	0	0	1	0	1	0
37	MF	(England) ENG	Josh Ruffels	34	1	21+7	1	4+1	0	0	0	1	0
-	GK	(England) ENG	Wayne Brown	0	0	0	0	0	0	0	0	0	0
-	DF	(Wales) WAL	Jonathan Meades	0	0	0	0	0	0	0	0	0	0

=== Top scorers ===
As of 3 May 2014

Place	Position	Nation	Number	Name	League Two	FA Cup	League Cup	JP Trophy	Total
1	FW	(England)	9	James Constable	10	1	0	1	12
2	FW	(England)	10	Deane Smalley	7	2	0	0	9
3	MF	(Australia)	15	Ryan Williams	7	1	0	0	8
4	MF	(England)	17	Danny Rose	4	1	0	0	5
5=	FW	(England)	24	David Connolly	4	0	0	0	4
5=	FW	(England)	8	Dave Kitson	4	0	0	0	4
5=	DF	(England)	19	Johnny Mullins	3	1	0	0	4
5=	MF	(England)	11	Alfie Potter	4	0	0	0	4
9	MF	(England)	14	Asa Hall	3	0	0	0	3
10=	MF	(England)	7	Sean Rigg	2	0	0	0	2
10=	MF	(England)	22	Nicky Wroe	2	0	0	0	2
12=	MF	(England)	18	Scott Davies	0	1	0	0	1
12=	DF	(England)	3	Tom Newey	1	0	0	0	1
12=	MF	(England)	37	Josh Ruffels	1	0	0	0	1
				TOTALS	51	7	0	1	59

=== Disciplinary record ===
As of 3 May 2014

Number	Nation	Position	Name	League Two		FA Cup		League Cup		JP Trophy		Total	
Number	Nation	Position	Name	Booked	Sent off (straight red)	Booked	Sent off (straight red)	Booked	Sent off (straight red)	Booked	Sent off (straight red)	Booked	Sent off (straight red)
3	(England)	DF	Tom Newey	9	1	0	0	1	0	0	0	10	1
4	(England)	DF	Michael Raynes	4	1	0	0	0	0	1	0	5	1
6	(England)	DF	Jake Wright	6	0	0	0	0	0	0	0	6	0
7	(England)	MF	Sean Rigg	4	0	0	0	1	0	0	0	5	0
8	(England)	FW	Dave Kitson	10	1	1	0	0	0	0	0	11	1
9	(England)	FW	James Constable	2	0	0	0	0	0	0	0	2	0
10	(England)	FW	Deane Smalley	3	0	0	0	0	0	1	0	4	0
11	(England)	MF	Alfie Potter	1	0	0	0	0	0	0	0	1	0
13	(England)	DF	David Hunt	6	0	0	0	0	0	0	0	6	0
14	(England)	MF	Asa Hall	3	0	0	0	0	0	0	0	3	0
15	(Australia)	MF	Ryan Williams	5	1	0	0	0	0	0	0	5	1
16	(England)	DF	Andy Whing	2	1	0	0	0	0	0	0	2	1
17	(England)	MF	Danny Rose	4	0	0	0	0	0	0	0	4	0
18	(England)	MF	Scott Davies	1	0	0	0	0	0	0	0	1	0
19	(England)	DF	Johnny Mullins	3	0	1	0	0	0	0	0	4	0
22	(England)	MF	Nicky Wroe	3	0	0	0	0	0	0	0	3	0
35	(England)	FW	Callum O'Dowda	1	0	0	0	0	0	1	0	2	0
37	(England)	MF	Josh Ruffels	1	0	0	0	0	0	0	0	1	0
			TOTALS	68	5	2	0	2	0	3	0	75	5

== Transfers ==
Players transferred in
Date	Pos.	Name	Previous club	Fee	Ref.
4 July 2013	DF	Tom Newey	Scunthorpe United	Free	
8 July 2013	DF	Kenzer Lee	West Ham United	Free	
8 July 2013	DF	Matt Bevans	Watford	Free	
22 July 2013	DF	Johnny Mullins	Rotherham United	Undisclosed	
30 July 2013	MF	Josh Ruffels	Coventry City	Free	
Players transferred out
Date	Pos.	Name	To	Fee	Ref.
30 July 2013	MF	Liam Davis	Yeovil Town	Free	
Players loaned in
Date from	Pos.	Name	From	Date to	Ref.
4 July 2013	MF	Asa Hall	Shrewsbury Town	January 2014	
3 August 2013	MF	Ryan Williams	Fulham	end of season	
12 September 2013	GK	Shwan Jalal	A.F.C. Bournemouth	2 October 2013	
10 January 2014	MF	Nicky Wroe	Preston North End	end of season	
10 January 2014	GK	Jonathan Henly	Reading	March 2014	
31 January 2014	FW	David Connolly	Portsmouth	end of season	
Players loaned out
Date from	Pos.	Name	To	Date to	Ref.
