= Andy Whing =

English footballer and manager (born 1984)

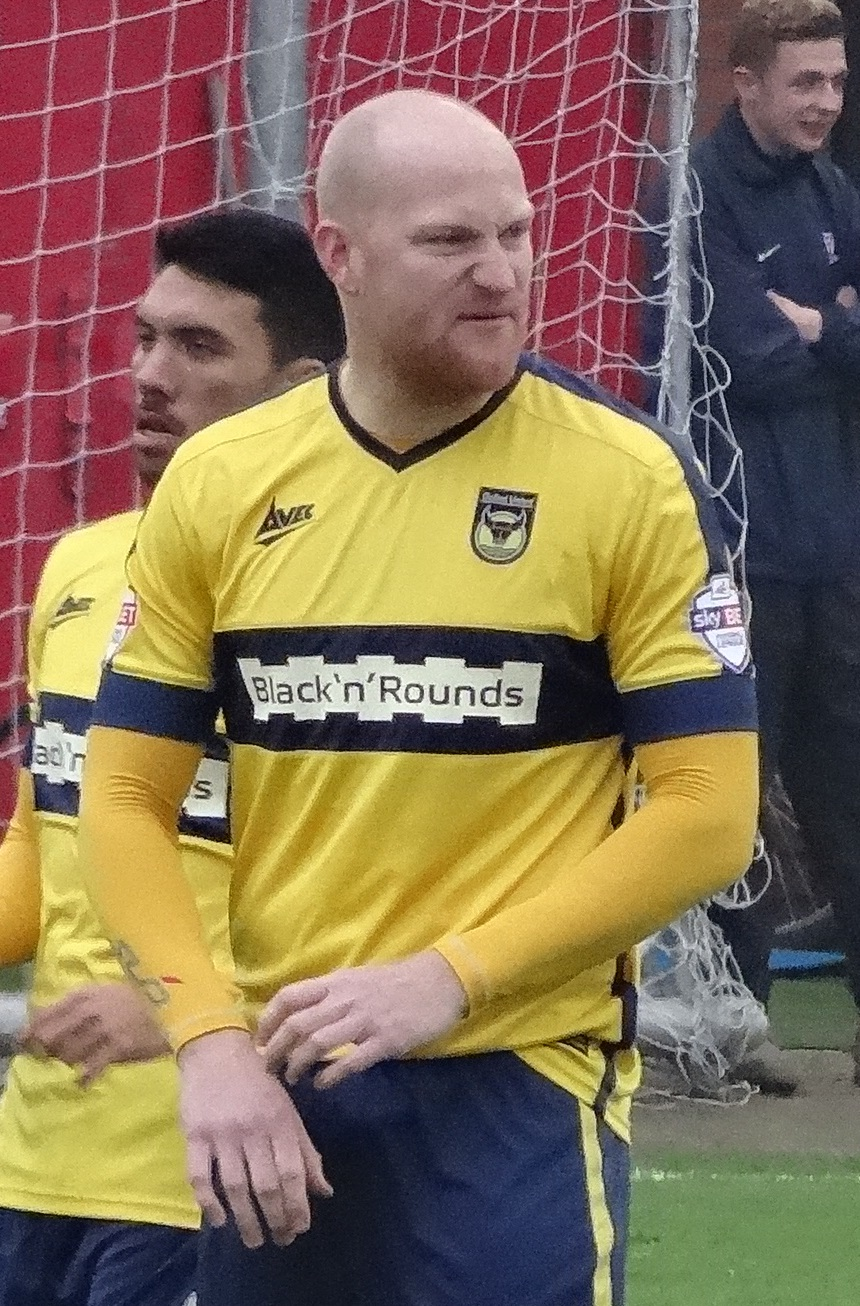
- Whing playing for Oxford United in 2014

Personal information
- Full name: Andrew John Whing
- Date of birth: 20 September 1984 (age 42)
- Place of birth: Birmingham, England
- Height: 6 ft 0 in (1.83 m)
- Position: Right back

Senior career*
Years	Team	Apps	(Gls)
2003–2007	Coventry City	106	(2)
2006	→ Brighton & Hove Albion (loan)	12	(0)
2007–2011	Brighton & Hove Albion	91	(0)
2010	→ Chesterfield (loan)	11	(0)
2010–2011	→ Leyton Orient (loan)	5	(0)
2011	Leyton Orient	19	(2)
2011–2015	Oxford United	102	(2)
Total		346	(6)

Managerial career
- 2020–2023: Banbury United
- 2023–2025: Solihull Moors
- 2025: Barrow
- 2026: Brackley Town
- * Club domestic league appearances and goals

Andrew John Whing (born 20 September 1984) is an English football manager and former professional footballer who played as a right back. He was most recently the manager of National League club Brackley Town.

== Playing career ==
=== Coventry City ===
Whing was born in Birmingham, West Midlands. He grew up supporting Aston Villa and had trials at Birmingham City and Derby County before joining Coventry City at the age of thirteen. While progressing at the club's academy, Whing was released and then re-signed. Whing eventually came through the ranks at Coventry and was appointed captain at the club's academy.

Whing made his first-team debut at Highfield Road in a Division One game against Burnley in February 2003. Following a string of first-team appearances, Whing signed his first professional contract, keeping him until 2005.

Ahead of the 2003–04 season, Whing changed shirt from 40 to 2. His first goal for Coventry came in a 3–1 home defeat against Nottingham Forest in August 2003. During the season, he made more first-team appearances, rewarded by a four-year contract and praise from manager Eric Black. Whing established himself in the first-team squad during the 2003–04 season, in which he made a total of 31 appearances in all competitions.

However, he made fewer starts the following season after a hernia operation and losing his right-back position to new signing Louis Carey. He did, however, provide a moment that will never be forgotten by Coventry fans in scoring the last ever goal for Coventry at Highfield Road in the 6–2 win over Derby County in the 2004–05 season. He was the recipient of the goal of the season award and a special award for the historic goal. His running high-five celebration became the moment that almost all Coventry fans remember him for. This helped the full-back's return to the regular first-team selection during the first season at the Ricoh Arena, in which he played 36 times in all competitions.

The 2005–06 season proved to be the high-water mark of Whing's Coventry career. Some poor performances the following season saw him loaned and then sold to Brighton & Hove Albion, who were managed by his former manager Micky Adams. After being recalled by Coventry in late December, Whing made his first appearance in a 1–1 draw against Southend United, but was rarely selected for the first team and played in the reserves throughout the season. At the end of the season, he was among four players to be released by Coventry. After the announcement of his release, Whing was given a farewell lap of honour after the final home match of the season, having made over 100 appearances for the club.

=== Brighton & Hove Albion ===
Whing initially joined Brighton & Hove Albion on loan on 8 October 2006, initially for one month. He made his Brighton & Hove Albion debut, as a right-back, in a 3–0 loss against Blackpool. Club and fans alike were impressed by what they saw of Whing and the club extended his spell at the Withdean twice more. Despite his wishes to extend his loan deal at Brighton, Whing was recalled by Coventry on 27 December, as the team looked to reinvigorate themselves following a run of three straight defeats. Brighton then tried unsuccessfully to sign Whing on a permanent basis during the January transfer window.

Whing eventually joined Brighton permanently during the summer of 2007 after his contract ended at Coventry. On signing, Whing said joining the club was an easy decision. His first game after signing for the club on a permanent basis came in the opening game of the season, a 2–1 defeat to Crewe. He was sent off two weeks later after a second bookable offence, in a 2–0 loss against Tranmere Rovers. He remained in the first team throughout the 2007–08 season, making 42 appearances.

Whing retained his starting position at right-back at the start of the 2008–09 season, until he was dropped from the first team for one game in late November following a blunder that resulted a winning goal, in a 1–0 loss against Huddersfield Town. After making his return against Oldham Athletic, Whing hoped his good performance would keep him in the first team. Whing went on to make forty appearances for the club and, after helping them avoid relegation, was overwhelmingly voted Brighton's player of the year for the 2008–09 season, receiving 77% of the vote. With his contract expiring at the end of the 2008–09 season, Whing attracted interest from Walsall and Leeds United, around the same time he was offered a new contract. After his move to Leeds United stalled, Whing signed a new two-year contract with Brighton.

In the first half of the 2009–10 season, Whing remained in the right-back position for the first seven matches until he suffered a dead leg and was substituted, in a 1–0 defeat to Wycombe Wanderers. After being sidelined for two months, he made his return from injury for the club's reserves on 11 November 2009 against Millwall's reserves and returned to the first team four days later, in a 3–1 win over Southampton.

However, under new manager Gus Poyet, Whing found first-team opportunities at Brighton very limited; therefore, on 5 March 2010, he was allowed to join League Two side Chesterfield on loan until the end of the season. He made his Chesterfield debut four days later, coming on as a substitute for Dan Gray in a 1–0 loss against Notts County. Whing went on to make eleven appearances for the club.

=== Leyton Orient ===
On 28 October 2010, Whing signed for Leyton Orient on a two-month loan deal. He made his Leyton Orient debut five days later, on 2 November 2010, in a 3–2 loss against Colchester United.

After impressing Os boss Russell Slade with five appearances, Whing signed for Orient until the end of the season, and his Brighton contract was cancelled by mutual consent. On 12 February 2011, he scored his first goal in several years in Orient's 4–1 victory over Bristol Rovers. Three weeks later on 5 March 2011, he scored his second goal, in a 2–0 win over Notts County. After making 19 appearances and scoring twice, Whing was offered a one-year contract extension.

=== Oxford United ===
Instead, Whing signed a two-year deal with Oxford United when his contract with Leyton Orient expired in the summer of 2011. He said of Oxford: "This is a fantastic club with a lovely stadium and it gets great attendances that are worthy of a Championship side and it shows the potential here."

Whing made his Oxford United debut in the opening game of the 2011–12 season, a 1–0 loss against Rotherham United, on 6 August 2011. Apart from a minor illness, he remained in the first team throughout the season. After initial criticism, he won the Supporters Player of the Year Award at the end of the season.

In the 2012–13 season Whing retained his number 16 shirt. However, he suffered a groin injury that kept him out of the team for the first part of the season. By early October, he had returned to training and returned to the first team on 15 October 2012, coming on as a substitute in the 82nd minute for Tom Craddock, in a 3–0 loss against Port Vale. He scored his first goal for Oxford in a 2–2 draw at Barnet on 20 November 2012. He subsequently suffered an injury to his knee and ankle during a FA Cup match against Accrington Stanley on 1 December 2012. After making a recovery in early February, he returned to the first team, coming on as a substitute for Adam Chapman in the final minutes of a 3–0 loss against Plymouth Argyle on 16 February 2013. His second Oxford goal was an uncharacteristic scissor-kick against Rochdale that left keeper Josh Lillis stunned. Despite being restricted by injury to 22 appearances, Whing signed a contract with the club keeping him until 2016. At the end of the season, Whing was awarded Goal of the Season for his goal against Rochdale.

At the start of the 2013–14 season, Whing regained his right-back position. In the absence of captain Jake Wright, he was made captain for the match against Cheltenham Town on 14 September 2013, which ended 2–2. After the match, Whing described the award of the captain's armband as a "privilege". In the next game, a 1–0 defeat to Chesterfield, Whing was sent off in the 67th minute for a professional foul on Eoin Doyle. After serving a suspension and making his return, Whing suffered an ankle injury during a match against Mansfield Town, which led to his being sidelined until January. An operation further extended his period out of the team, and he remained on the sidelines until 21 March 2014, when he made his return to the starting eleven in a 1–0 win over Hartlepool United. Whing went on to make eighteen appearances for the club in 2013–14.

Shortly after the end of the 2013–14 season, Whing had an operation on his hip, resulting in him missing the start of the 2014–15 season. After playing his first match of the season in the reserve side, Whing made his first appearance of the 2014–15 season, coming on as a substitute for Brian Howard in the 57th minute of a televised 5–1 defeat to Cambridge United on 11 October 2014. He expressed "delight" on making his return, and remained in midfield in the first team, before suffering a hip injury during a reserve match against Southend United. He made three more appearances towards the end of the season, in which he made 23 appearances in total.

At the end of the season, Whing announced that he would not be signing a new playing contract with Oxford, although he was in talks over a new role at the club. He had previously hinted about his retirement from professional football, citing his injury, and had already started a UEFA B Licence course. In late November, Whing was appointed jointly with Leon Blackmore-Such as the club's under-18 coach. In September 2017 he left, after six years as a player and coach with the club, to become head coach of the under-23 side at Kidderminster Harriers.

During his time at Oxford United, Whing became something of a cult hero on the Oxford terraces.

== Coaching and managerial career ==
On 18 September 2017, Whing was announced as the new head coach of Kidderminster Harriers' under-23 team.

In September 2019, Whing joined National League North club Hereford and was re-united with former manager Russell Slade.

Whing was appointed as manager of Southern League Premier Division Central club Banbury United on 12 May 2020, with his former Oxford United teammate James Constable as his assistant. Whing led Banbury to the Southern League Premier Division Central Title during the 2021–22 season, promotion being secured on 2 April 2022 with four matches remaining, the club earning promotion to the National League for the first time in their history, to be playing in either the North or South division. Following survival in their first season in the National League North, he resigned from his role in May 2023.

On 28 June 2023, Whing was appointed head coach of National League club Solihull Moors. Having ended August top of the league, he was awarded the National League Manager of the Month award.

On 20 January 2025, Whing was appointed head coach of League Two club Barrow on a two-and-a-half year deal. On 10 December 2025, after almost 11 months in charge, Whing was sacked by Barrow with the club 18th in League Two.

Whing was appointed manager of National League club Brackley Town on 17 February 2026.

== Personal life ==
From August 2008 to April 2009, Whing was a columnist for the Worthing Herald newspaper.

== Career statistics ==
As of match played 2 May 2015

Appearances and goals by club, season and competition
Club	Season	League			FA Cup		EFL Cup		Other		Total	
Club	Season	Division	Apps	Goals	Apps	Goals	Apps	Goals	Apps	Goals	Apps	Goals
Coventry City	2002–03	First Division	14	0	0	0	0	0	—		14	0
Coventry City	2003–04	First Division	28	1	2	0	1	0	—		31	1
Coventry City	2004–05	Championship	16	1	0	0	3	0	—		19	1
Coventry City	2005–06	Championship	32	0	2	0	2	0	—		36	0
Coventry City	2006–07	Championship	16	0	2	0	1	0	—		19	0
Coventry City	Total		106	2	6	0	7	0	0	0	119	2
Brighton & Hove Albion (loan)	2006–07	League One	12	0	—		—		3 (Note: Appearances in Football League Trophy / EFL Trophy)	0	15	0
Brighton & Hove Albion	2007–08	League One	42	0	3	0	1	0	2	0	48	0
Brighton & Hove Albion	2008–09	League One	40	0	2	0	3	0	6	0	51	0
Brighton & Hove Albion	2009–10	League One	9	0	1	0	1	0	0	0	11	0
Brighton & Hove Albion	2010–11	League One	0	0	0	0	1	0	0	0	1	0
Brighton & Hove Albion	Total		91	0	6	0	6	0	8	0	111	0
Chesterfield (loan)	2009–10	League Two	11	0	—		—		0	0	11	0
Leyton Orient (loan)	2010–11	League One	5	0	0	0	—		0	0	5	0
Leyton Orient	2010–11	League One	19	2	4	0	—		0	0	23	2
Oxford United	2011–12	League Two	41	0	1	0	1	0	2	0	45	0
Oxford United	2012–13	League Two	22	2	2	0	0	0	1	0	25	2
Oxford United	2013–14	League Two	18	0	0	0	1	0	0	0	19	0
Oxford United	2014–15	League Two	21	0	2	0	0	0	0	0	23	0
Oxford United	Total		102	2	5	0	2	0	3	0	112	2
Careet total			346	6	21	0	15	0	14	0	396	6

== Managerial statistics ==
As of match played 17 September 2026

Managerial record by team and tenure
Team	From	To	Record					Ref.
Team	From	To	P	W	D	L	Win %	Ref.
Banbury United	12 May 2020	22 May 2023	118	63	25	30	53.4	
Solihull Moors	28 June 2023	20 January 2025	89	41	23	25	46.1	
Barrow	20 January 2025	10 December 2025	46	15	13	18	32.6	
Brackley Town	17 February 2026	17 September 2026	24	3	5	16	12.5	
Total			277	122	66	89	44.0	

== Honours ==
=== As a manager ===
Solihull Moors

- FA Trophy runner-up: 2023–24

Individual

- National League Manager of the Month: August 2023
