= James Constable =

English association football player

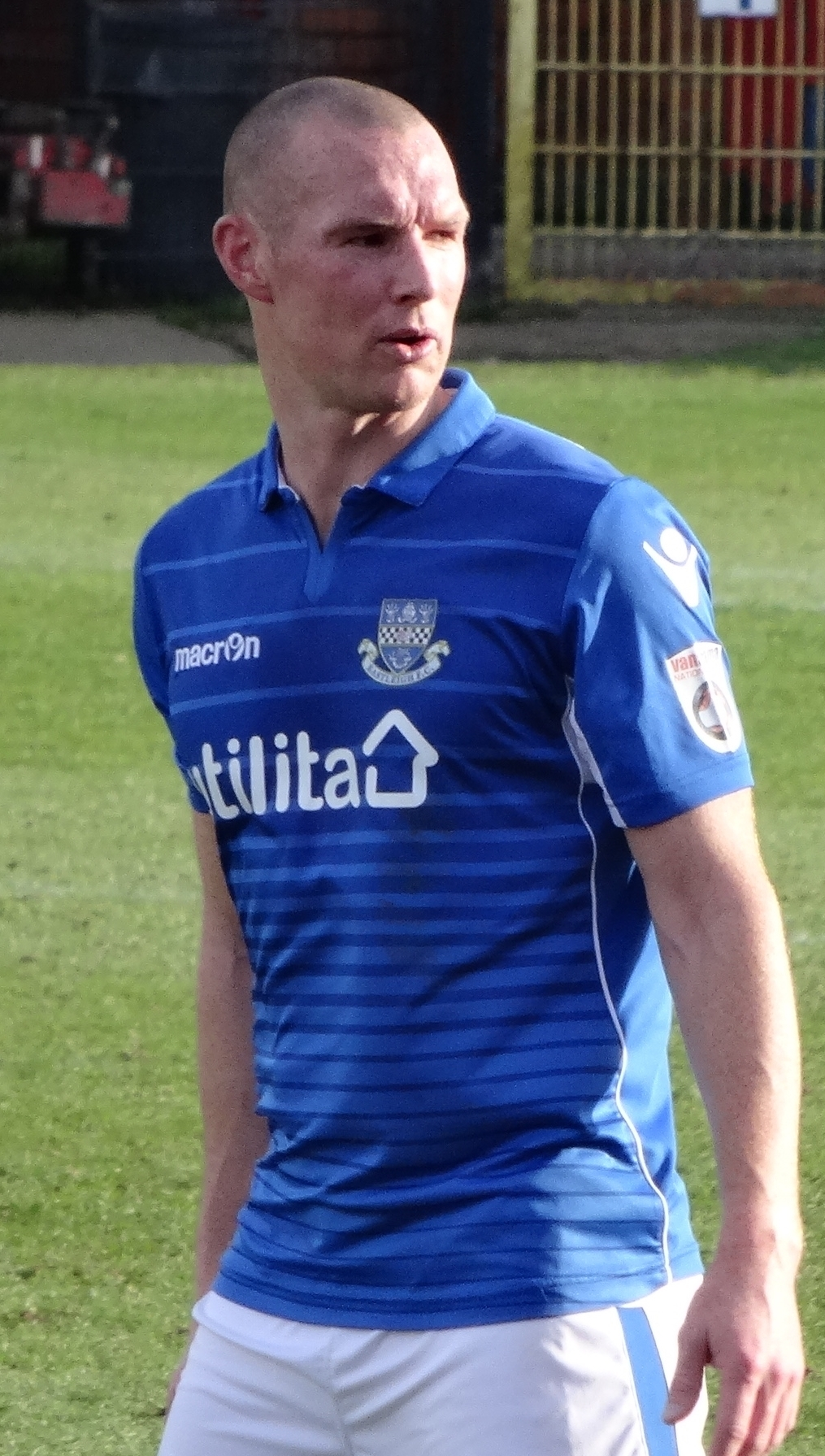
- Constable playing for Eastleigh in 2017

Personal information
- Full name: James Ashley Constable
- Date of birth: 4 October 1984 (age 42)
- Place of birth: Malmesbury, England
- Height: 6 ft 2 in (1.88 m)
- Position: Striker

Team information
- Current team: Oxford United (first-team player liaison manager)

Youth career
- Cirencester Town

Senior career*
Years	Team	Apps	(Gls)
–2003	Cirencester Town		
2003–2006	Chippenham Town	66	(29)
2005–2006	→ Walsall (loan)	6	(2)
2006–2007	Walsall	17	(1)
2006–2007	→ Kidderminster Harriers (loan)	9	(5)
2007–2008	Kidderminster Harriers	38	(12)
2008–2009	Shrewsbury Town	14	(4)
2008–2009	→ Oxford United (loan)	42	(23)
2009–2014	Oxford United	204	(67)
2014–2019	Eastleigh	161	(39)
2018	→ Poole Town (loan)	10	(2)
2018–2019	→ Poole Town (loan)	25	(13)
2019	Hungerford Town	17	(3)
2020–2021	Banbury United	5	(0)
Total		654	(200)

International career
2007–2009	England C	3	(1)

Managerial career
- 2021–2023: Banbury United (player-assistant)
- * Club domestic league appearances and goals as of 23:37, 19 June 2021 (UTC)

James Ashley Constable (born 4 October 1984) is an English former professional footballer and coach who played as a striker. He played in the Football League for Walsall, Shrewsbury Town and Oxford United. He is first-team player liaison manager at Oxford United.

Constable started his career with the Cirencester Town youth system, before breaking into the first team during the 2002–03 season. He moved to Chippenham Town in 2003, before signing for Walsall in the Football League in 2005. He moved out on loan to Kidderminster Harriers of the Conference National in 2006, before signing permanently in 2007. After a year at the club, during which he scored the first club goal at the new Wembley Stadium in the 2007 FA Trophy final, he returned to the League with Shrewsbury Town. After spending 2008–09 on loan at Oxford United, he signed for the club permanently in 2009. Constable scored the second goal in Oxford's 3–1 2010 Conference Premier play-off final victory over York City in 2010, which secured Oxford's promotion into League Two. He was leading goalscorer in each of his six seasons at the club, and when he left after 2013–14 he had scored 106 goals, one short of the club record.

He has played for the England national C team, who represent England at non-League level, making his debut in 2007 in a 2–0 victory over Finland in the International Challenge Trophy. He scored the goal in a 2–2 draw with Italy in 2008 that took England to the International Challenge Trophy final, which Constable played in as England were defeated 1–0 by the Belgium under-21 team in 2009.

== Club career ==
=== Early life and career ===
Constable was born in Malmesbury, Wiltshire, and grew up in the town as a Tottenham Hotspur supporter. He played for Malmesbury Youth before starting his career with Cirencester Town after progressing through their youth system, playing for the academy and making several first-team appearances as a substitute in the 2002–03 season. He progressed to being a regular in the team and signed for Southern League Premier Division club Chippenham Town in December 2003. He made his debut in a 3–1 defeat to Tiverton Town on 1 January 2004, scoring in the following match against Nuneaton Borough with the opening goal in a 1–1 draw He finished 2003–04 with 19 appearances and 9 goals for Chippenham. He made 37 appearances and scored 13 goals in 2004–05. He scored for Chippenham with the opening goal in a 1–1 draw against Worcester City in the FA Cup first round in November 2005. While playing as a semi-professional at Chippenham, he worked in an undergarment lining factory.

=== Walsall ===
Football League clubs Bristol City, Swansea City, Swindon Town and Walsall all made enquiries for Constable in November 2005. He eventually signed for League One team Walsall on 21 November 2005 on loan until 1 January 2006, when he would sign permanently for a fee of £4,000 on a contract until June 2007, having made 14 appearances and scored 8 goals for Chippenham up to that point in 2005–06. He made his debut as an 82nd-minute substitute in a 1–0 victory over AFC Bournemouth in the Football League Trophy on 22 November 2005. This was followed by his Football League debut four days later after being introduced as an 89th-minute substitute in a 3–1 victory over Rotherham United.

He scored his first goal for Walsall in a 3–2 victory over Wycombe Wanderers in the Trophy on 20 December with a "fine drive", which drew the teams at 1–1. Constable scored two goals in seven minutes to help Walsall to a 2–0 victory over Blackpool. His first appearance after signing permanently came in a 3–0 defeat to Bristol City on 2 January 2006. He scored Walsall's second equaliser in a 2–2 draw against Swansea City in the Football League Trophy, which was lost 6–5 on a penalty shoot-out. Chippenham failed in an attempt to re-sign Constable on loan for the remainder of 2005–06 in February 2006. He scored his last goal of 2005–06 with a shot from Dean Keates' cross, which was the opening goal in a 1–1 draw with Port Vale on 15 April 2006. He finished the season with 5 goals in 20 appearances for Walsall.

=== Kidderminster Harriers ===
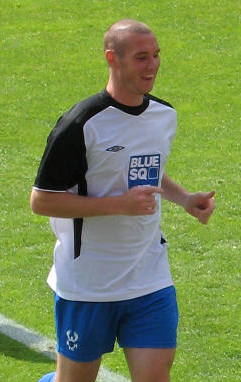
Constable warming up for Kidderminster Harriers in 2007

He joined Conference National club Kidderminster Harriers on 24 November 2006 on a two-month loan, having made nine appearances for Walsall up to that point in 2006–07. After arriving at Kidderminster, he made "a mammoth impact". He made his debut in a 2–1 defeat to Stevenage Borough, and manager Mark Yates praised him, saying "I thought James was excellent, bar taking the couple of chances that fell his way he can be well pleased with himself." He scored his first goal in the following match, a 3–1 victory over Gravesend & Northfleet, with a "clinical finish" from a Michael Blackwood cross. He scored two goals against Stafford Rangers after he "coolly slotted home" and scored with "ease into the bottom-right corner", which gave Kidderminster a 2–1 victory on 26 December 2006. His hat-trick in a 4–0 victory against Vauxhall Motors in the first round of the FA Trophy in January 2007 was the first for a Kidderminster player since Bo Henriksen in 2003. After impressing during the loan, he moved to the club permanently on 31 January 2007 on a two-and-a-half-year contract for an undisclosed fee. He scored Kidderminster's equaliser in a 1–1 draw against St Albans City on 24 March 2007, before being sent off for a "wild" challenge on Ahmed Deen. In the 2007 FA Trophy final, Constable scored the first and second goals for an English club at the new Wembley Stadium, although his efforts were in vain as Kidderminster lost 3–2 to Stevenage Borough. He finished the season as Kidderminster's top scorer with 16 goals in 32 appearances.

He scored his first goals of 2007–08 with a hat-trick in a 4–0 victory over Exeter City on 1 September 2007. After two matches without scoring, he scored a second hat-trick for Kidderminster in a 5–4 defeat to Ebbsfleet United. He was substituted at half-time in Kidderminster's 2–1 defeat to Histon in October 2007, after picking up a hamstring injury. He made his return in a 2–0 victory over Ware in the FA Cup in November 2007, scoring the first goal with a shot from 18 yards. He was sent off in a 2–0 defeat against Oxford United on 24 November 2007 for elbowing James Clarke, and after having an appeal rejected, was given a three-match suspension. He made his return in a 2–1 away win over Hinckley United in the Conference League Cup on 22 December 2007.

=== Shrewsbury Town ===
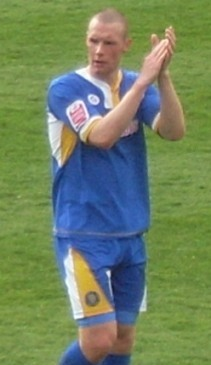
Constable playing for Shrewsbury Town in 2008

Constable transferred to League Two club Shrewsbury Town on 31 January 2008, transfer deadline day, along with Harriers teammate Scott Bevan, being billed as "the striker to help Shrewsbury Town push for the play-offs." He made his debut two days later, coming on as a 50th-minute substitute in a 2–1 defeat to Lincoln City. A week later, Constable scored his first goal for Shrewsbury with a 79th-minute equaliser in a 1–1 away draw with Brentford, his deflected cross-shot rolling in off the far post. He made his first start in the next match on 12 February 2008, scoring twice as his team came back from 3–0 down to draw 3–3 at home to Milton Keynes Dons. He scored one more goal before the end of the season, in a 3–0 victory over Wrexham, which he finished with 14 appearances and 4 goals for Shrewsbury. The signings of Grant Holt and Richard Walker during the summer resulted in Constable falling down the pecking order at Shrewsbury.

=== Oxford United ===
Constable returned to the Conference Premier after signing for Oxford United on 8 July 2008 on a season-long loan for 2008–09. He made his debut in a 3–0 defeat by Barrow on 8 August 2008, scoring his first goals in a 6–3 victory over Eastbourne Borough a week later, scoring twice and providing an assist. He scored both goals in a 2–1 victory over Northwich Victoria on 2 September 2008, which was Oxford's first away victory of the season. He picked up a groin strain during a 1–1 draw with Kettering Town, and was expected to be out of action for two to three weeks. He did not miss any matches through this injury, playing in a 1–0 defeat to former club Kidderminster. He scored the winning goal in a 2–1 victory over Burton Albion on 18 October 2008, which he said "was an absolutely massive result". Manager Chris Wilder said in January 2009 he wanted to extend Constable's stay the club, claiming he "epitomises what I am trying to build here at the club". With regard to extending his stay at Oxford, Constable said he was "open to offers". He gathered further praise from Wilder later in the month and there were calls from Oxford fans for Constable to be signed permanently.

Constable had a run of scoring five goals in as many matches from 28 December 2008 to 20 January 2009, which constituted four home victories for Oxford. Following this, he went seven matches without a goal, before scoring two in a 3–3 draw with Forest Green Rovers on 7 March 2009. Oxford announced he had agreed a permanent contract with the club in April 2009, although this was denied by Shrewsbury, who stated the transfer was not yet complete. He scored the winning goal for Oxford in a 1–0 victory over Wrexham on 11 April 2009 with a header in the fourth minute of stoppage time, which was described as "one of the most dramatic late goals in Oxford United's history". He finished the season with 49 appearances and 26 goals, after which he claimed Oxford's Supporters' Player of the Year and the Players' Player of the Year awards. Constable's permanent transfer to Oxford eventually took place on 28 April 2009, signing a three-year contract for an undisclosed fee. After the end of the season, he won the Conference Premier's Player of the Year and Fans' Player of the Year awards.

He started 2009–10 with a "flood of goals", scoring 6 times in his first 11 appearances, with his first goals of the season coming in a 4–3 victory over Histon on 15 August 2009. In the following match, he scored his first hat-trick for Oxford in a 4–0 victory over Chester City. However, following Chester's expulsion from the Football Conference in March 2010, these goals were discounted from the records as their results were expunged. He said in February 2010 that he was considering stepping aside as Oxford's penalty kick taker, having missed three over the season. Constable suffered an ankle injury in March 2010, meaning he missed three matches, with manager Wilder saying "I wouldn't put the long-term health of James in jeopardy". He made his return in a 0–0 draw with Tamworth on 21 March 2010. Constable scored for Oxford in a 1–1 draw at Rushden & Diamonds in their play-off semi-final first leg on 29 April 2010, giving them the lead on 29 minutes with a 12-yard volley before Mark Byrne equalised for Rushden. He scored the second goal in the 2–0 victory over Rushden in the second leg, meaning the tie was won 3–1 on aggregate. He scored Oxford's second goal as they defeated York City 3–1 in the 2010 Conference Premier play-off final at Wembley Stadium to end their four-year exile from the Football League. At the Football Conference's Annual Presentation Dinner, he was named in the Conference Premier Team of the Year, having finished the season with 26 goals in 44 appearances.

Having acted as captain during the previous season following an injury to Adam Murray, Constable was appointed captain permanently ahead of 2010–11. He played in Oxford's first Football League match since promotion, a 0–0 draw with Burton on 7 August. His first goals of the season came after he scored two in a 6–1 victory over League One team Bristol Rovers on 10 August. Constable finished the season with 17 goals in 46 appearances.

Oxford accepted an improved offer for Constable from local rivals Swindon Town on 19 January 2012. Oxford allowed Constable to talk to the club, although he refused the opportunity to discuss the move with Swindon manager Paolo Di Canio.

On 16 November 2013, Constable scored his 100th goal for Oxford in a 3–1 away victory at Mansfield Town.

=== Eastleigh ===
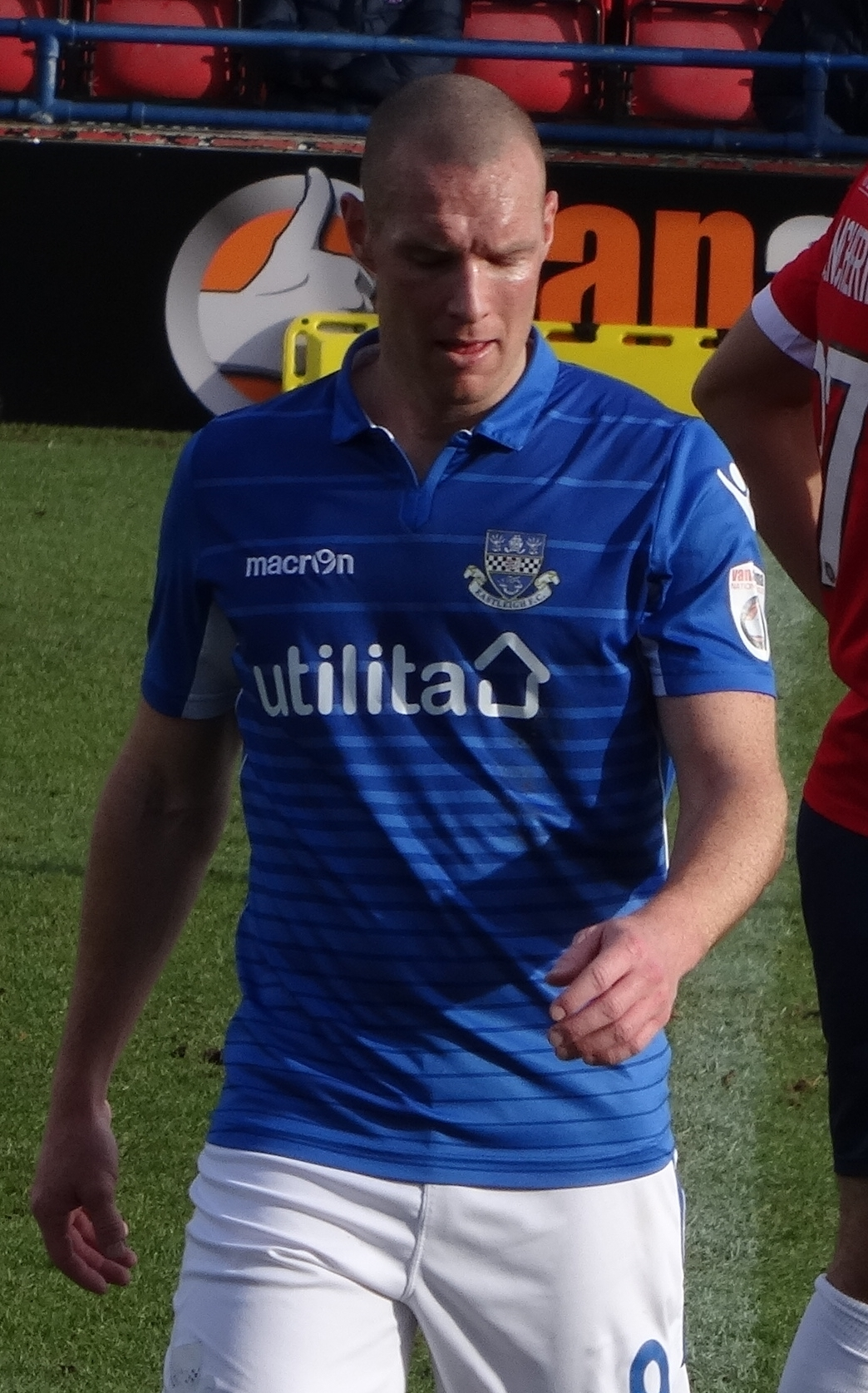
Constable playing for Eastleigh in 2017

Having been one goal short of equalling Oxford's club record for goals scored of 107, Constable turned down a new contract with the club to sign for newly promoted Conference Premier team Eastleigh on 21 May 2014 on a two-year contract. He made his debut in a 3–0 away victory over Nuneaton Town on the opening day of 2014–15 on 9 August 2014.

Constable joined National League South club Poole Town on 23 February 2018 on a one-month loan. He made his debut a day later, starting in a 1–0 defeat away to Braintree Town. He scored two goals from 10 appearances as Poole were relegated with a 20th-place finish in the table.

Constable re-joined Poole Town on 7 December 2018 on a one-month loan, with the club now in the Southern League Premier Division South. The loan was later extended until the end of the 2018–19 season. He announced his retirement from full-time football in February 2019.

=== Later career ===
Constable signed for National League South club Hungerford Town on 29 June 2019 as a player-coach. In October, while still a Hungerford player, he signed for ice hockey club Oxford City Stars of the NIHL South Division 1. He left Hungerford by mutual consent on 25 November.

Constable signed for Southern League Premier Division Central club Banbury United on 12 May 2020 as a player and as the assistant to newly appointed manager Andy Whing.

== International career ==
Constable was named in the England national C team, who represent England at non-League level, in November 2007, for a 2007–09 International Challenge Trophy match against Finland. He made his debut after starting the match and England won 2–0. He was called up again in October 2008 for a match against Italy, scoring the goal that sent England to the International Challenge Trophy final in a 2–2 draw at the Stadio Santa Colomba. Constable was called up to the team for this match against the Belgium under-21 team, saying "It's an incredibly proud feeling to be representing my country at this level." He started the match, which was played at Oxford's Kassam Stadium, and England lost 1–0, during which he had a frustrating performance. He earned three caps and scored one goal for England C from 2007 to 2009.

== Style of play ==
Constable plays as a striker and is "a big, powerful frontman with bags of pace". He has been described as being a prolific goalscorer, leading to remarks of him being a "hot-shot" and a "goal machine". He was described as a "young, hungry player with bags of potential" by Kidderminster manager Mark Yates in 2007. His strike partnership at Oxford United with Matt Green and Jamie Cook was described as "devastating" in 2009.

== Post-playing career ==
In September 2023, Constable returned to former club Oxford United as Head of Player Care in the club's academy. He became first-team player liaison manager in July 2024.

== Career statistics ==
As of 7 November 2020

Appearances and goals by club, season and competition
Club	Season	League			FA Cup		League Cup		Other		Total	
Club	Season	Division	Apps	Goals	Apps	Goals	Apps	Goals	Apps	Goals	Apps	Goals
Chippenham Town	2003–04	Southern League; Premier Division	19	9	0	0	—		0	0	19	9
Chippenham Town	2004–05	Southern League; Premier Division	35	13	0	0	—		2 (Note: Appearances in Southern League Premier Division play-offs)	0	37	13
Chippenham Town	2005–06	Southern League; Premier Division	12	7	2	1	—		0	0	14	8
Chippenham Town	Total		66	29	2	1	—		2	0	70	30
Walsall	2005–06	League One	17	3	—		—		3 (Note: Appearance(s) in Football League Trophy)	2	20	5
Walsall	2006–07	League Two	6	0	1	0	1	0	1	0	9	0
Walsall	Total		23	3	1	0	1	0	4	2	29	5
Kidderminster Harriers	2006–07	Conference National	23	6	—		—		9 (Note: Appearance(s) in FA Trophy)	10	32	16
Kidderminster Harriers	2007–08	Conference Premier	24	11	1	1	—		3 (Note: One appearance and one goal in Conference League Cup, two appearances and one goal in FA Trophy)	2	28	14
Kidderminster Harriers	Total		47	17	1	1	—		12	12	60	30
Shrewsbury Town	2007–08	League Two	14	4	—		—		—		14	4
Oxford United (loan)	2008–09	Conference Premier	42	23	4	2	—		3 (Note: One appearance in Conference League Cup, two appearances and one goal in FA Trophy)	1	49	26
Oxford United	2009–10	Conference Premier	37	22	2	1	—		5 (Note: Two appearances in FA Trophy, three appearances and three goals in Conference Premier play-offs)	3	44	26
Oxford United	2010–11	League Two	44	15	0	0	2	2	0	0	46	17
Oxford United	2011–12	League Two	40	11	1	0	1	0	1	0	43	11
Oxford United	2012–13	League Two	39	9	3	3	2	0	3	2	47	14
Oxford United	2013–14	League Two	44	10	5	1	1	0	1	1	51	12
Oxford United	Total		246	90	15	7	6	2	13	7	280	106
Eastleigh	2014–15	Conference Premier	43	18	3	1	—		2 (Note: Appearances in Conference Premier play-offs)	0	48	19
Eastleigh	2015–16	National League	36	15	4	1	—		2	1	42	17
Eastleigh	2016–17	National League	42	4	5	1	—		0	0	47	5
Eastleigh	2017–18	National League	26	2	1	0	—		1	0	28	2
Eastleigh	2018–19	National League	14	0	1	0	—		0	0	15	0
Eastleigh	Total		161	39	14	3	—		5	1	180	43
Poole Town (loan)	2017–18	National League South	10	2	—		—		—		10	2
Poole Town (loan)	2018–19	Southern League; Premier Division South	25	13	—		—		3 (Note: One appearance in Dorset Senior Cup, two in Southern League Premier Division South play-offs)	0	28	13
Poole Town (loan)	Total		35	15	—		—		3	0	38	15
Hungerford Town	2019–20	National League South	17	3	2	1	—		0	0	19	4
Banbury United	2020–21	Southern League; Premier Division Central	5	0	3	0	—		0	0	8	0
Career total			654	200	38	13	7	2	39	22	698	237

== Honours ==
Oxford United

- Conference Premier play-offs: 2010

Individual

- Oxford United Player of the Year: 2008–09
- Conference Premier Player of the Year: 2008–09
- Conference Premier Team of the Year: 2009–10
