= Matt Bevans =

English footballer (born 1993)

Personal information
- Full name: Matthew David Charles Bevans
- Date of birth: 19 September 1993 (age 33)
- Place of birth: Enfield, England
- Position: Defender

Team information
- Current team: Plymouth Argyle (first-team coach)

Youth career
- 2010–2012: Watford

Senior career*
Years	Team	Apps	(Gls)
2012–2013	Watford	0	(0)
2012	→ Chesham United (loan)	11	(0)
2013–2015	Oxford United	22	(0)
2014	→ Farnborough (loan)	7	(0)
2015	Wealdstone	?	(?)
2015–?	Oxford City	?	(?)
- * Club domestic league appearances and goals as of 20:05, 23 December 2015 (UTC)

Matthew David Charles Bevans (born 19 September 1993) is an English professional football coach and former player who is first-team coach of EFL League One club Plymouth Argyle.

== Career ==
Bevans started a two-year scholarship at Watford in the summer of 2010. In September 2011 he suffered a knee injury against Southampton's Academy which was anticipated to rule him out for the rest of the season. in April 2012.

On 16 November 2012, Bevans joined Chesham United of the Southern Football League Premier Division on loan for thirty days. This was subsequently lengthened to the end of January, and his contract at Watford was extended until the end of the 2012–13 season.

Bevans was released by Watford in June 2013. He subsequently joined League Two side Oxford United for the 2013–14 season. Bevans made his professional debut on 5 December 2013 in a 1–0 FA Cup win over Gateshead. His league debut followed on 28 January 2014, when he came on as a half-time substitute at Exeter City, and his first league start and first home appearance was in a 2–1 victory over AFC Wimbledon on 1 February 2014. In total Bevans played 22 times for Oxford in 2013-14 and the end of the season the club activated a clause in his contract to extend it for another year.

On 29 August 2014, Bevans was loaned to Conference South side Farnborough for a month, with the deal later extended by a further two months in late September. However, while playing for Farnborough Bevans suffered a knee injury and after undergoing surgery in October, it was announced that he would be out for six to nine months. Bevans made his return to Oxford United's development squad in a 0–0 draw against Northampton Town's reserves on 20 April 2015.

At the end of the 2014–15 season, Oxford announced that Bevans would not be offered a new contract at the club. In August National League South side Wealdstone announced they had signed Bevans for the 2015–16 season. In December he moved to another NL South side, Oxford City.

By October 2018 Bevans had returned to Chesham, leaving that month for another spell at Farnborough. In March 2019 he suffered an torn anterior cruciate ligament and Farnborough opened a fund for his treatment.

== Coaching career ==
On 23 May 2024, Bevans was appointed Under-18s lead coach at his former club, Watford.

In June 2025, Bevans joined League One club Plymouth Argyle as first-team coach.

== Professional career statistics ==
As of match played 3 May 2014.

Appearances and goals by club, season and competition
Club	Season	League			FA Cup		League Cup		Other		Total	
Club	Season	Division	Apps	Goals	Apps	Goals	Apps	Goals	Apps	Goals	Apps	Goals
Oxford United	2013–14	League Two	18	0	2	0	0	0	0	0	20	0
Career total			10	0	2	0	0	0	0	0	12	0
