= 2004–05 Coventry City F.C. season =

Coventry City F.C.
2004–05 season
- Manager: Peter Reid
- Stadium: Highfield Road
- Championship: 19th
- FA Cup: OUT – Newcastle United; Fourth Round 29.01.05
- League Cup: OUT – Middlesbrough; Third Round 27.10.04
- Top goalscorer: League: All: Gary McSheffrey (14)
- Highest home attendance: 22,728 v Derby County 30.04.05 Cup: 8,362 v Sheffield Wednesday 22.09.04
- Lowest home attendance: 11,966 v Gillingham 15.09.04 Cup: 6,180 v Torquay United 25.08.04
- Average home league attendance: 16,046

This article describes Coventry City Football Club's progress in the 2004–05 season, during which the Sky Blues competed in the Football League Championship, the FA Cup (entering in the Third Round) and the League Cup (entering from the First Round). The 2004–05 season was the last season in which the club played their home games at Highfield Road before their move to the Ricoh Arena.

== Matches ==
=== Championship ===
7 August 2004 1	Coventry City	2–0	Sunderland	Coventry
17:35	Suffo 84' (pen.); Johnson 90'	report		Stadium: Highfield Road; Attendance: 16,460; Referee: Richard Beeby

10 August 2004 2	Cardiff City	2–1	Coventry City	Cardiff
19:45	Earnshaw 54'; Lee 60'	report	Barrett 29'	Stadium: Ninian Park; Attendance: 14,031; Referee: Iain Williamson

14 August 2004 3	Brighton & Hove Albion	1–1	Coventry City	Brighton
15:00	Virgo 88'	report	Hughes 68'	Stadium: Withdean Stadium; Attendance: 6,368; Referee: Phil Joslin

21 August 2004 4	Coventry City	0–1	Millwall	Coventry
15:00		report	Dichio 78'	Stadium: Highfield Road; Attendance: 13,910; Referee: Martin Atkinson

28 August 2004 5	Nottingham Forest	1–4	Coventry City	Nottingham
15:00	Johnson 73'	report	Morrell 39', 50'; Johnson 68'; Hughes 69'	Stadium: City Ground; Attendance: 23,041; Referee: Michael Ryan

30 August 2004 6	Coventry City	2–1	West Ham United	Coventry
15:00	Doyle 45'; Morrell 76'	report	Sheringham 40'	Stadium: Highfield Road; Attendance: 17,404; Referee: Colin Webster

11 September 2004 7	Leeds United	3–0	Coventry City	Leeds
15:00	Carlisle 39'; Joachim 70'; Pugh 90+2'	report		Stadium: Elland Road; Attendance: 26,725; Referee: Paul Robinson

15 September 2004 8	Coventry City	2–2	Gillingham	Coventry
19:45	Morrell 30'; John 47' (pen.)	report	Agyemang 64', 76'	Stadium: Highfield Road; Attendance: 11,966; Referee: Mike Pike

18 September 2004 9	Coventry City	0–0	Rotherham United	Coventry
15:00		report		Stadium: Highfield Road; Attendance: 13,834; Referee: Phil Crossley

25 September 2004 10	Sheffield United	1–1	Coventry City	Sheffield
15:00	Black 29'	report	Morrell 14'	Stadium: Bramall Lane; Attendance: 16,337; Referee: Graham Laws

28 September 2004 11	Queens Park Rangers	4–1	Coventry City	London
19:45	Cureton 32', 40', 73'; Furlong 89'	report	Barrett 48'	Stadium: Loftus Road; Attendance: 14,680; Referee: Alan Kaye

3 October 2004 12	Coventry City	1–2	Ipswich Town	Coventry
13:00	Suffo 76'	report	Bowditch 69'; Mills 87' (o.g.)	Stadium: Highfield Road; Attendance: 12,608; Referee: Clive Penton

16 October 2004 13	Coventry City	1–1	Leicester City	Coventry
15:00	Makin 79' (o.g.)	report	Dublin 69'	Stadium: Highfield Road; Attendance: 18,054; Referee: Chris Foy

19 October 2004 14	Burnley	2–2	Coventry City	Burnley
19:45	Blake 63' (pen.); Branch 72'	report	Johnson 62'; Barrett 69'	Stadium: Turf Moor; Attendance: 10,919; Referee: Scott Mathieson

23 October 2004 15	Wigan Athletic	4–1	Coventry City	Wigan
15:00	Mahon 14'; Graham 52'; Ellington 61'; Flynn 90+2'	report	Johnson 30'	Stadium: JJB Stadium; Attendance: 9,632; Referee: Phil Crossley

30 October 2004 16	Coventry City	3–2	Reading	Coventry
15:00	John 13' (pen.); Morrell 50'; Johnson 65'	report	Owusu 10'; Kitson 70'	Stadium: Highfield Road; Attendance: 13,663; Referee: Graham Salisbury

3 November 2004 17	Coventry City	1–1	Preston North End	Coventry
19:45	Suffo 49' (pen.)	report	Lewis 68'	Stadium: Highfield Road; Attendance: 12,478; Referee: Kevin Wright

8 November 2004 18	Leicester City	3–0	Coventry City	Leicester
19:45	Nalis 26'; Tiatto 46'; Heath 71'	report		Stadium: Walkers Stadium; Attendance: 22,479; Referee: Mark Clattenburg

13 November 2004 19	Coventry City	2–1	Plymouth Argyle	Coventry
15:00	Hughes 7'; Barrett 14'	report	Evans 47'	Stadium: Highfield Road; Attendance: 15,314; Referee: Mike Jones

20 November 2004 20	Wolverhampton Wanderers	0–1	Coventry City	Wolverhampton
12:30		report	McSheffrey 61'	Stadium: Molineux; Attendance: 26,291; Referee: Martin Atkinson

27 November 2004 21	Coventry City	0–1	Crewe Alexandra	Coventry
15:00		report	Ashton 24' (pen.)	Stadium: Highfield Road; Attendance: 12,823; Referee: Paul Taylor

4 December 2004 22	Derby County	2–2	Coventry City	Derby
15:00	Rasiak 87'; Peschisolido 90'	report	Hughes 21'; Adebola 79'	Stadium: Pride Park Stadium; Attendance: 22,648; Referee: Phil Joslin

11 December 2004 23	Stoke City	1–0	Coventry City	Stoke-on-Trent
15:00	Akinbiyi 21'	report		Stadium: Britannia Stadium; Attendance: 15,744; Referee: Clive Penton

18 December 2004 24	Coventry City	1–0	Watford	Coventry
15:00	McSheffrey 45'	report		Stadium: Highfield Road; Attendance: 14,493; Referee: Colin Webster

26 December 2004 25	Coventry City	1–2	Sheffield United	Coventry
15:00	John 18'	report	Morgan 31'; Gray 39'	Stadium: Highfield Road; Attendance: 21,146; Referee: Mike Dean

28 December 2004 26	Gillingham	3–1	Coventry City	Gillingham
15:00	Byfield 14'; Cox 47', 48'	report	Adebola 36'	Stadium: Priestfield Stadium; Attendance: 8,734; Referee: Phil Joslin

1 January 2005 27	Rotherham United	1–2	Coventry City	Rotherham
15:00	Júnior 38'	report	John 57'; Williams 75'	Stadium: Millmoor; Attendance: 5,742; Referee: Lee Mason

3 January 2005 28	Coventry City	1–2	Leeds United	Coventry
15:00	McSheffrey 81'	report	Blake 27'; Healy 64'	Stadium: Highfield Road; Attendance: 19,084; Referee: Nigel Miller

15 January 2005 29	Ipswich Town	3–2	Coventry City	Ipswich
15:00	Bent 44', 58'; Kuqi 78'	report	John 11'; McSheffrey 60' (pen.)	Stadium: Portman Road; Attendance: 23,670; Referee: Mike Russell

22 January 2005 30	Coventry City	1–2	Queens Park Rangers	Coventry
15:00	Williams 59'	report	Cureton 13'; Furlong 90+2'	Stadium: Highfield Road; Attendance: 16,595; Referee: Mark Clattenburg

5 February 2005 31	Preston North End	3–2	Coventry City	Preston
15:00	Alexander 22' (pen.); Cresswell 23'; Lucketti 48'	report	Jørgensen 14'; McSheffrey 72'	Stadium: Deepdale; Attendance: 13,691; Referee: Russell Booth

12 February 2005 32	Coventry City	0–2	Burnley	Coventry
15:00		report	Oster 64'; Thomas-Moore 69'	Stadium: Highfield Road; Attendance: 13,236; Referee: Steve Tanner

19 February 2005 33	Reading	1–2	Coventry City	Reading
15:00	Ferdinand 8'	report	McSheffrey 63'; John 72'	Stadium: Madejski Stadium; Attendance: 15,904; Referee: Graham Salisbury

23 February 2005 34	Coventry City	1–2	Wigan Athletic	Coventry
19:45	McSheffrey 22' (pen.)	report	Teale 9'; Ellington 68'	Stadium: Highfield Road; Attendance: 12,130; Referee: Richard Beeby

26 February 2005 35	Coventry City	0–0	Stoke City	Coventry
15:00		report		Stadium: Highfield Road; Attendance: 13,871; Referee: Jarnail Singh

5 March 2005 36	Watford	2–3	Coventry City	Watford
15:00	Dyer 32'; Webber 84'	report	Benjamin 14'; Jørgensen 54'; Doyle 78'	Stadium: Vicarage Road; Attendance: 13,794; Referee: Mike Thorpe

12 March 2005 37	Coventry City	1–1	Cardiff City	Coventry
15:00	John 16'	report	Bullock 19'	Stadium: Highfield Road; Attendance: 17,059; Referee: Lee Mason

15 March 2005 38	Millwall	1–1	Coventry City	London
19:45	Morris 69'	report	Jørgensen 89'	Stadium: The Den; Attendance: 8,835; Referee: Clive Penton

19 March 2005 39	Sunderland	1–0	Coventry City	Sunderland
15:00	Brown 76'	report		Stadium: Stadium of Light; Attendance: 29,424; Referee: Alan Wiley

2 April 2005 40	Coventry City	2–1	Brighton & Hove Albion	Coventry
15:00	McSheffrey 47' (pen.); Staunton 84'	report	Virgo 62'	Stadium: Highfield Road; Attendance: 18,606; Referee: Mark Cowburn

6 April 2005 41	Coventry City	2–0	Nottingham Forest	Coventry
19:45	McSheffrey 24' (pen.); Adebola 41'	report		Stadium: Highfield Road; Attendance: 22,221; Referee: Andy D'Urso

9 April 2005 42	West Ham United	3–0	Coventry City	London
15:00	Shaw 76' (o.g.); Sheringham 89' (pen.); Zamora 90'	report		Stadium: Upton Park; Attendance: 26,839; Referee: Iain Williamson

16 April 2005 43	Coventry City	2–2	Wolverhampton Wanderers	Coventry
15:00	McSheffrey 19' (pen.); John 90'	report	Clarke 15'; Naylor 79'	Stadium: Highfield Road; Attendance: 19,412; Referee: Grant Hegley

23 April 2005 44	Plymouth Argyle	1–1	Coventry City	Plymouth
15:00	Capaldi 90+6'	report	John 45+1'	Stadium: Home Park; Attendance: 18,443; Referee: Lee Probert

30 April 2005 45	Coventry City	6–2	Derby County	Coventry
15:00	McSheffrey 20', 29' (pen.); Adebola 37'; John 40', 55'; Whing 68'	report	Bolder 51'; Peschisolido 63'	Stadium: Highfield Road; Attendance: 22,728; Referee: Mick Fletcher

8 May 2005 46	Crewe Alexandra	2–1	Coventry City	Crewe
13:00	Higdon 54'; Jones 72'	report	Adebola 23'	Stadium: Alexandra Stadium; Attendance: 9,269; Referee: Alan Kaye

=== League Cup ===
25 August 2004 R1	Coventry City	4–1	Torquay United	Coventry
19:45	Hughes 52'; Suffo 62', 65'; Morrell 82'	report	Kuffour 73'	Stadium: Highfield Road; Attendance: 6,180; Referee: Andy Penn

22 September 2004 R2	Coventry City	1–0	Sheffield Wednesday	Coventry
19:45	Doyle 35'	report		Stadium: Highfield Road; Attendance: 8,362; Referee: Paul Armstrong

27 October 2004 R3	Middlesbrough	3–0	Coventry City	Middlesbrough
20:00	Németh 4'; Morrison 24'; Graham 70'	report		Stadium: Riverside Stadium; Attendance: 11,833; Referee: Uriah Rennie

=== FA Cup ===
8 January 2005 R3	Coventry City	3–0	Crewe Alexandra	Coventry
15:00	McSheffrey 25', 69'; John 45'	report		Stadium: Highfield Road; Attendance: 7,629; Referee: Iain Williamson

29 January 2005 R4	Newcastle United	3–1	Coventry City	Newcastle upon Tyne
15:00	Shearer 37'; Ameobi 42'; Bakayogo 52'	report	Adebola 45+2'	Stadium: St James' Park; Attendance: 44,044; Referee: Neale Barry

== Championship data ==
=== League table ===
Pos	Team	Pld	W	D	L	GF	GA	GD	Pts
17	Plymouth Argyle	46	14	11	21	52	64	−12	53
18	Watford	46	12	16	18	52	59	−7	52
19	Coventry City	46	13	13	20	61	73	−12	52
20	Brighton & Hove Albion	46	13	12	21	40	65	−25	51
21	Crewe Alexandra	46	12	14	20	66	86	−20	50

Updated to match(es) played on 9 December 2011. Source: Football League Tables
Rules for classification: 1) points; 2) goal difference; 3) number of goals scored.

=== Results summary ===
Overall								Home						Away					
Pld	W	D	L	GF	GA	GD	Pts	W	D	L	GF	GA	GD	W	D	L	GF	GA	GD
46	13	13	20	61	73	−12	52	8	7	8	32	28	+4	5	6	12	29	45	−16

Last updated: 8 May 2005.
Source: CCFC Championship Results

=== Round by round ===
Round	1	2	3	4	5	6	7	8	9	10	11	12	13	14	15	16	17	18	19	20	21	22	23	24	25	26	27	28	29	30	31	32	33	34	35	36	37	38	39	40	41	42	43	44	45	46
Ground	H	A	A	H	A	H	A	H	H	A	A	H	H	A	A	H	H	A	H	A	H	A	A	H	H	A	A	H	A	H	A	H	A	H	H	A	H	A	A	H	H	A	H	A	H	A
Result	W	L	D	L	W	W	L	D	D	D	L	L	D	D	L	W	D	L	W	W	L	D	L	W	L	L	W	L	L	L	L	L	W	L	D	W	D	D	L	W	W	L	D	D	W	L
Position	1	7	7	15	9	5	11	10	11	10	17	18	19	18	19	18	16	20	17	16	18	18	19	18	19	19	19	20	20	21	21	21	20	21	21	21	21	21	22	19	17	17	18	19	17	19

Updated to match(es) played on 8 May 2005. Source: Championship Results
A = Away; H = Home; W = Win; D = Draw; L = Loss

=== Scores Overview ===
Opposition	Home Score	Away Score	Double
Brighton & Hove Albion	2–1	1–1	✗
Burnley	0–2	2–2	✗
Cardiff City	1–1	1–2	✗
Crewe Alexandra	0–1	1–2	✗
Derby County	6–2	2–2	✗
Gillingham	2–2	1–3	✗
Ipswich Town	1–2	2–3	✗
Leeds United	1–2	0–3	✗
Leicester City	1–1	0–3	✗
Millwall	0–1	1–1	✗
Nottingham Forest	2–0	4–1	✓
Plymouth Argyle	2–1	1–1	✗
Preston North End	1–1	2–3	✗
Queens Park Rangers	1–2	1–4	✗
Reading	3–2	2–1	✓
Rotherham United	0–0	2–1	✗
Sheffield United	1–2	1–1	✗
Stoke City	0–0	0–1	✗
Sunderland	2–0	0–1	✗
Watford	1–0	3–2	✓
West Ham United	2–1	0–3	✗
Wigan Athletic	1–2	1–4	✗
Wolverhampton Wanderers	2–2	1–0	✗

== Season statistics ==
=== Stats and goals ===
No.	Pos	Nat	Player	Total		Championship		League Cup		FA Cup	
No.	Pos	Nat	Player	Apps	Goals	Apps	Goals	Apps	Goals	Apps	Goals
1	GK	(Scotland) SCO	Scott Shearer	9	0	8+0	0	1+0	0	0+0	0
2	DF	(England) ENG	Andy Whing	19	1	9+7	1	0+3	0	0+0	0
3	DF	(Republic of Ireland) IRL	Steve Staunton	37	1	32+3	1	1+0	0	1+0	0
4	MF	(England) ENG	Lloyd Dyer	6	0	6+0	0	0+0	0	0+0	0
5	DF	(Wales) WAL	Ady Williams	23	2	21+0	2	0+0	0	2+0	0
6	MF	(England) ENG	Stephen Hughes	44	5	39+1	4	2+0	1	2+0	0
8	DF	(Wales) WAL	Richard Duffy	15	0	14+0	0	0+0	0	1+0	0
9	FW	(Nigeria) NGA	Dele Adebola	26	6	19+6	5	0+0	0	0+1	1
10	FW	(England) ENG	Gary McSheffrey	41	14	31+6	12	1+1	0	2+0	2
11	FW	(Republic of Ireland) IRL	Graham Barrett	26	4	13+11	4	1+1	0	0+0	0
12	FW	(England) ENG	Andy Morrell	38	7	24+10	6	2+0	1	2+0	0
14	MF	(England) ENG	Tim Sherwood	11	0	10+1	0	0+0	0	0+0	0
15	MF	(Faroe Islands) FRO	Claus Bech Jørgensen	20	3	11+6	3	0+1	0	0+2	0
16	FW	(England) ENG	Eddie Johnson	29	5	22+4	5	1+1	0	0+1	0
17	MF	(Republic of Ireland) IRL	Michael Doyle	49	3	43+1	2	3+0	1	2+0	0
18	MF	(England) ENG	Neil Wood	16	0	6+7	0	2+0	0	1+0	0
19	FW	(Jamaica) JAM	Trevor Benjamin	12	1	6+6	1	0+0	0	0+0	0
20	DF	(England) ENG	Richard Shaw	37	0	30+3	0	3+0	0	1+0	0
21	DF	(England) ENG	Dean Leacock	16	0	12+1	0	1+0	0	1+1	0
24	FW	(Trinidad and Tobago) TRI	Stern John	33	12	25+5	11	1+0	0	2+0	1
25	MF	(England) ENG	Isaac Osbourne	9	0	7+2	0	0+0	0	0+0	0
26	DF	(England) ENG	Stuart Giddings	15	0	11+1	0	2+0	0	1+0	0
27	DF	(England) ENG	Marcus Hall	10	0	10+0	0	0+0	0	0+0	0
28	DF	(Wales) WAL	Rob Page	9	0	9+0	0	0+0	0	0+0	0
30	FW	(Bermuda) BER	Shaun Goater	6	0	4+2	0	0+0	0	0+0	0
33	GK	(England) ENG	Luke Steele	36	0	32+0	0	2+0	0	2+0	0
Players who featured for Coventry but left before the end of the season:
	GK	(England) ENG	Ian Bennett	6	0	6+0	0	0+0	0	0+0	0
	DF	(Scotland) SCO	Louis Carey	27	0	23+0	0	3+0	0	1+0	0
	DF	(England) ENG	Calum Davenport	7	0	6+0	0	1+0	0	0+0	0
	DF	(France) FRA	Éric Deloumeaux	3	0	1+1	0	1+0	0	0+0	0
	DF	(France) FRA	Florent Laville	6	0	5+1	0	0+0	0	0+0	0
	DF	(England) ENG	Matt Mills	5	0	4+0	0	1+0	0	0+0	0
	MF	(Iceland) ISL	Bjarni Guðjónsson	13	0	3+7	0	3+0	0	0+0	0
	MF	(France) FRA	Christian Negouai	2	0	1+0	0	0+0	0	1+0	0
	MF	(England) ENG	Rohan Ricketts	6	0	5+1	0	0+0	0	0+0	0
	FW	(Cameroon) CMR	Patrick Suffo	25	5	2+19	3	1+2	2	0+1	0

=== Goalscorers ===
No.	Flag	Pos	Name	Championship	League Cup	FA Cup	Total
10	(England)	FW	Gary McSheffrey	12	0	2	14
24	(Trinidad and Tobago)	FW	Stern John	11	0	1	12
12	(England)	FW	Andy Morrell	6	1	0	7
9	(Nigeria)	FW	Dele Adebola	5	0	1	6
6	(England)	MF	Stephen Hughes	4	1	0	5
16	(England)	FW	Eddie Johnson	5	0	0	5
	(Cameroon)	FW	Patrick Suffo	3	2	0	5
11	(Republic of Ireland)	FW	Graham Barrett	4	0	0	4
17	(Republic of Ireland)	MF	Michael Doyle	2	1	0	3
15	(Faroe Islands)	MF	Claus Bech Jørgensen	3	0	0	3
5	(Wales)	DF	Ady Williams	2	0	0	2
19	(Jamaica)	FW	Trevor Benjamin	1	0	0	1
3	(Republic of Ireland)	DF	Steve Staunton	1	0	0	1
2	(England)	DF	Andy Whing	1	0	0	1

=== Overall ===
Games played	51 (46 Championship, 3 League Cup, 2 FA Cup)
Games won	16 (13 Championship, 2 League Cup, 1 FA Cup)
Games drawn	13 (13 Championship, 0 League Cup, 0 FA Cup)
Games lost	22 (20 Championship, 1 League Cup, 1 FA Cup)
Goals scored	70 (61 Championship, 5 League Cup, 4 FA Cup)
Goals conceded	80 (73 Championship, 4 League Cup, 3 FA Cup)
Goal difference	−10
Best result	W 6–2 (H) v Derby County – Championship – 30 April 2005
Worst result	L 1–4 (A) v Queens Park Rangers – Championship – 28 September 2004; L 1–4 (A) v Wigan Athletic – Championship – 23 October 2004
Most appearances	(Republic of Ireland) Michael Doyle (49 appearances)
Top scorer	(England) Gary McSheffrey (14 goals)
Points	52 / 138 (37.68%)
