= Deane Smalley =

English footballer (born 1988)

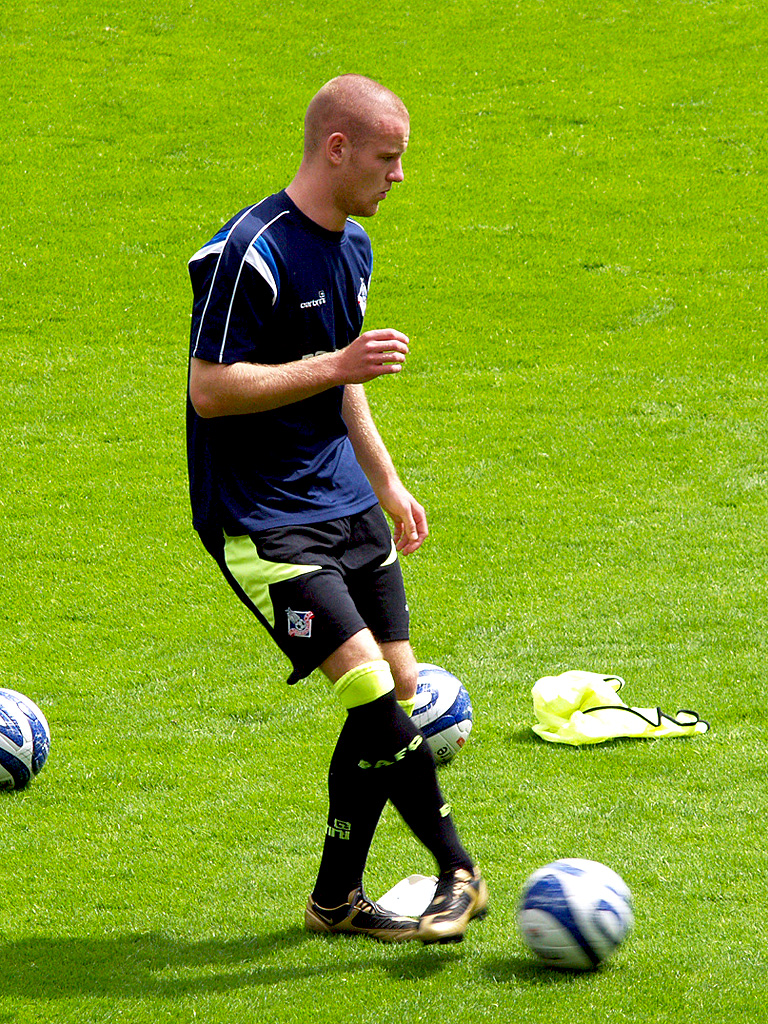
- Smalley with Oldham Athletic in 2009

Personal information
- Full name: Deane Alfie Michael Smalley
- Date of birth: 5 September 1988 (age 38)
- Place of birth: Chadderton, England
- Height: 6 ft 0 in (1.83 m)
- Position: Forward

Team information
- Current team: Avro

Youth career
- –2007: Oldham Athletic

Senior career*
Years	Team	Apps	(Gls)
2007–2011	Oldham Athletic	105	(10)
2010	→ Rochdale (loan)	3	(0)
2010–2011	→ Chesterfield (loan)	28	(12)
2011–2014	Oxford United	81	(13)
2012	→ Bradford City (loan)	13	(0)
2014–2016	Plymouth Argyle	19	(2)
2016	→ Newport County (loan)	3	(0)
2018–2019	Chester	17	(1)
2019	Hyde United	8	(2)
2019–2020	Abbey Hey		
2020–2023	Wythenshawe Town		
2023–	Avro	13	(2)
- * Club domestic league appearances and goals as of 14:25, 6 December 2023 (UTC)

Deane Alfie Michael Smalley (born 5 September 1988) is an English professional footballer who is currently signed to Avro. His career saw him play as a striker before converting to playing as a centre-back later in his career.

== Career ==
Born in Chadderton, Greater Manchester, Smalley began his career with Oldham Athletic and regularly featured in the reserve squad, before making two appearances with the first at the end of the 2006–07 season. His first team debut came on 24 February 2007 in a 1–0 loss to Blackpool.

Smalley's first goal for the club came on 14 August 2007 in a 4–1 win versus Mansfield Town in the League Cup. On 28 August 2007, Smalley made his first start in a 3–0 loss to Burnley in the League Cup. On 26 April 2008, Smalley scored his first league goal for Oldham Athletic in a 2–1 win versus Cheltenham Town.

He joined Rochdale on a month-long loan on 23 September 2010 before joining Chesterfield on loan on 1 November.

At the end of the 2010–11 season he was offered a new contract by Oldham, but instead he rejected it to sign for Oxford United on a two-year contract. As Smalley was under the age of 24, Oldham Athletic were entitled to compensation from Oxford and agreed an undisclosed figure with the club.

He signed on loan for Bradford City in January 2012. He made his debut against Burton Albion, coming on as a 72nd-minute substitute for Nahki Wells. He returned to Oxford at the end of the season after making 13 appearances for Bradford.

On 25 August 2012, he scored twice as Oxford beat Plymouth Argyle 2–1 at the Kassam Stadium. After a poor injury-hit season, Smalley signed a new one-year deal with Oxford on reduced terms. He repaid the faith shown in him by scoring two goals in a 4–1 away victory over Portsmouth on the opening day of the 2013–14 season.

He signed for Plymouth Argyle on 20 May 2014, scoring his first goal for the club in a 1-1 League 2 draw with Stevenage. In December 2014 he suffered cruciate ligament injuries and only returned to the match day squad in November 2015, 11 months later, in a league game against Leyton Orient.

On 21 January 2016 Smalley joined Newport County on loan until the end of the 2015–16 season. He made his Newport debut in the starting line up versus Dagenham & Redbridge on 23 January 2016.

In the summer of 2018 he signed for Chester after a successful trial with the club.

On 13 February 2019, Smalley signed with Hyde United where he linked up with his brother Dom Smalley. He played 8 games for the club, scoring two goals, before joining Abbey Hey on 3 August 2019. In December 2020, he switched to North West Counties Football League Premier Division rivals Wythenshawe Town.

On the 4th July 2023, Smalley signed for Avro FC along with his brother Dom. https://www.avrofc.co.uk/smalleys-sign-up-for-2023-24-season/

== Career statistics ==
As of 26 October 2013

Club	Season	League		FA Cup		League Cup		Other		Total	
Club	Season	Apps	Goals	Apps	Goals	Apps	Goals	Apps	Goals	Apps	Goals
Oldham Athletic	2006–07	2	0	0	0	0	0	0	0	2	0
Oldham Athletic	2007–08	37	2	5	0	2	1	0	0	44	3
Oldham Athletic	2008–09	34	5	2	0	2	0	1	0	39	5
Oldham Athletic	2009–10	29	3	1	0	0	0	0	0	30	3
Oldham Athletic	2010–11	3	0	0	0	0	0	1	0	4	0
Rochdale (loan)	2010–11	3	0	0	0	0	0	0	0	3	0
Chesterfield (loan)	2010–11	28	12	1	0	0	0	0	0	29	12
Oxford United	2011–12	22	1	1	0	1	0	2	1	26	2
Bradford City (loan)	2011–12	13	0	0	0	0	0	0	0	13	0
Oxford United	2012–13	27	5	0	0	1	0	0	0	28	5
Oxford United	2013–14	32	7	5	2	1	0	1	0	39	9
Career total		230	35	15	2	7	1	5	1	257	39

== Honours ==
Chesterfield

- Football League Two: 2010–11
