= 2025–26 Coventry City F.C. season =

English football club season

Coventry City
2025–26 season
- Owner: Doug King
- Executive chairman: Doug King
- Head coach: Frank Lampard
- Stadium: Coventry Building Society Arena
- Championship: 1st (promoted)
- FA Cup: Third round
- EFL Cup: Second round
- Top goalscorer: League: Haji Wright (17); All: Haji Wright (18)
- Highest home attendance: 31,647 v Sheffield Wednesday; 11 April 2026, Championship
- Lowest home attendance: 10,595 v Luton Town; 12 August 2025, League Cup
- Average home league attendance: 29,403
- Biggest win: 7–1 v Queens Park Rangers (H); 23 August 2025, Championship
- Biggest defeat: 0–3 v Ipswich Town (A); 6 December 2025, Championship
Home colours	Away colours

The 2025–26 season was the 142nd season in the history of Coventry City Football Club and their sixth consecutive season in the Championship. In addition to the domestic league, the club also participated in the FA Cup and the EFL Cup.

On 17 April 2026, Coventry officially confirmed their promotion back to the Premier League with three matches to spare following a 1–1 draw at Blackburn Rovers, marking their return to the top flight for the first time since 2001.

== Pre-season and friendlies ==
On 3 June, Coventry City announced their first pre-season friendly, away against Bristol Rovers. Their second pre-season friendly was announced later that day, a home tie against La Liga side Real Betis. On 4 July it was announced that Coventry City will face German Bundesliga team FC St. Pauli in their final pre-season game, a home friendly. On 10 July Coventry City announced they would face AS Monaco of the Ligue 1 in a behind closed doors friendly on 16 July at St George's Park Coventry kicked off their pre-season with a behind closed doors game against Liga Portugal 2 side Portimonense to wrap up their training trip to Portugal.

Win Draw Loss Fixtures

12 July 2025 Friendly	(Portugal) Portimonense	2–0	Coventry City	Portimão
17:00	Lobato 48'; Kim Tae-won 74'	Report		Stadium: Estádio Municipal

16 July 2025 Friendly	Coventry City	0–5	(France) Monaco	Burton upon Trent
17:00			Ouattara 28'; Biereth 74'; Akliouche 61', 70', 87'	Stadium: St George's Park

23 July 2025 Friendly	Bristol Rovers	0–2	Coventry City	Bristol
19:00	Sparkes (yellow card) 12'	Report	Raphael 63'; Kesler-Hayden 81'	Stadium: Memorial Stadium; Attendance: 4,194; Referee: Steve Martin

26 July 2025 Friendly	Brighton & Hove Albion	2–0	Coventry City	Brighton
16:00	Ayari 23'; Sima 78'	Report		Stadium: AMEX Elite Football Performance Centre; Attendance: 0

30 July 2025 Friendly	Coventry City	1–1	(Spain) Real Betis	Coventry
19:00	Rudoni 25'	Report	García 46'	Stadium: Coventry Building Society Arena

2 August 2025 Friendly	Coventry City	2–2	(Germany) FC St. Pauli	Coventry
15:30	Thomas-Asante 25'; Simms 75'	Report	Hountondji 43'; Sinani 82'	Stadium: Coventry Building Society Arena

== Competitions ==
=== Overall record ===
Competition	First match	Last match	Starting round	Final position	Record							
Competition	First match	Last match	Starting round	Final position	Pld	W	D	L	GF	GA	GD	Win %
EFL Championship	9 August 2025	2 May 2026	Matchday 1	Winners	46	28	11	7	97	45	+52	60.87
FA Cup	10 January 2026		Third round	Third round	1	0	0	1	0	1	−1	0.00
EFL Cup	12 August 2025	26 August 2025	First round	Second round	2	1	0	1	2	2	+0	50.00
Total					49	29	11	9	99	48	+51	59.18

Source: Soccerway

=== Championship ===
==== League table ====
Pos	Team	Pld	W	D	L	GF	GA	GD	Pts	Promotion, qualification or relegation
1	Coventry City (C, P)	46	28	11	7	97	45	+52	95	Promotion to the Premier League
2	Ipswich Town (P)	46	23	15	8	80	47	+33	84	Promotion to the Premier League
3	Millwall	46	24	11	11	64	49	+15	83	Qualification for the Championship play-offs
4	Southampton (Note: Southampton qualified for the play-offs and defeated Middlesbrough to qualify for the final, but were subsequently disqualified for multiple breaches of EFL regulations related to the unauthorised filming of other clubs' training, with Middlesbrough taking their place in the play-off final.) (D)	46	22	14	10	82	56	+26	80	Qualification for the Championship play-offs
5	Middlesbrough	46	22	14	10	72	47	+25	80	Qualification for the Championship play-offs

Source: EFL Official Website
Rules for classification: 1) Points; 2) Goal difference; 3) Number of goals scored; 4) Head-to-head results; 5) Wins; 6) Away goals; 7) Penalty points (sec 9.5); 8) Number of 12-point sending off offences; 9) Play-off (only if needed to determine promotion/relegation)
(C) Champions; (D) Disqualified; (P) Promoted

==== Results summary ====
Overall								Home						Away					
Pld	W	D	L	GF	GA	GD	Pts	W	D	L	GF	GA	GD	W	D	L	GF	GA	GD
46	28	11	7	97	45	+52	95	17	4	2	51	19	+32	11	7	5	46	26	+20

Source: Soccerway

==== Results by round ====
Round	1	2	3	4	5	6	7	8	9	10	11	12	13	14	15	16	17	18	19	20	21	22	23	24	25	26	27	28	29	30	31	32	33	34	35	36	37	38	39	40	41	42	43	44	45	46
Ground	H	A	H	A	H	A	H	A	A	A	A	H	A	H	A	H	A	H	A	A	H	A	H	H	A	A	H	H	A	A	H	H	A	A	H	A	H	H	A	H	A	H	A	H	H	A
Result	D	W	W	D	D	D	W	W	W	W	W	W	L	W	W	W	W	W	L	D	W	D	W	L	D	L	W	W	L	L	D	W	W	W	W	W	W	L	W	W	D	D	D	W	W	W
Position	14	5	3	5	6	6	2	2	1	1	1	1	1	1	1	1	1	1	1	1	1	1	1	1	1	1	1	1	1	1	2	1	1	1	1	1	1	1	1	1	1	1	1	1	1	1
Points	1	4	7	8	9	10	13	16	19	22	25	28	28	31	34	37	40	43	43	44	47	48	51	51	52	52	55	58	58	58	59	62	65	68	71	74	77	77	80	83	84	85	86	89	92	95

Source: EFL
A = Away; H = Home; W = Win; D = Draw; L = Loss; P = Postponed

==== Matches ====
The league fixtures were released on 26 June 2025.

Win Draw Loss Fixtures

9 August 2025 1	Coventry City	0–0	Hull City	Coventry
12:30 BST	Van Ewijk (yellow card) 57'; Dasilva (yellow card) 65'; Rushworth (yellow card) 90+1'	Report	Slater (yellow card) 66'; Crooks (yellow card) 90+1'; McBurnie (yellow card) 90+1'	Stadium: Coventry Building Society Arena; Attendance: 29,052; Referee: Bobby Madley

16 August 2025 2	Derby County	3–5	Coventry City	Derby
12:30 BST	Elder 12'; Clarke (yellow card) 45+1'; Morris 45+2' (pen.); Adams 50'; Nyambe (yellow card) 62'	Report	Thomas 7', (yellow card) 45+1'; Wright 25' (pen.), (yellow card) 76'; Grimes (yellow card) 55'; Thomas-Asante 72'; Mason-Clark 75'; Torp 79'; Van Ewijk (yellow card) 83'; Rushworth (yellow card) 90'	Stadium: Pride Park Stadium; Attendance: 30,465; Referee: Anthony Backhouse
Note: Fixture was initially scheduled for a 15:00 kick-off, but was moved for live Sky Sports broadcast.

23 August 2025 3	Coventry City	7–1	Queens Park Rangers	Coventry
15:00 BST	Wright 12', 37'; Thomas-Asante 23'; Rudoni 35', 43'; Torp 47', 66'; Kitching (yellow card) 90'	Report	Dunne (yellow card) 28'; Mbengue (yellow card) 75'; Kone 90+1'	Stadium: Coventry Building Society Arena; Attendance: 29,015; Referee: Adam Herczeg

30 August 2025 4	Oxford United	2–2	Coventry City	Oxford
15:00 BST	Lankshear 19'; Brannagan 55', (yellow card) 75'	Report	Wright 12'; Torp 37', (yellow card) 88'; Thomas (yellow card) 49'	Stadium: Kassam Stadium; Attendance: 11,279; Referee: Ruebyn Ricardo

13 September 2025 5	Coventry City	1–1	Norwich City	Coventry
15:00 BST	Thomas (yellow card) 36'; Kitching (yellow card) 54'; Wright 90+6'	Report	Kvistgaarden 17'; Fisher (yellow card) 34'; Kovačević (yellow card) 44'; Diallo (yellow card) 53'; Topić (yellow card) 71'; Medić (yellow card) 90+5'; Crnac (yellow card) 90+9'	Stadium: Coventry Building Society Arena; Attendance: 30,547; Referee: Gavin Ward

20 September 2025 6	Leicester City	0–0	Coventry City	Leicester
12:30 BST		Report	Dasilva (yellow card) 55'; Bidwell (yellow card) 90+2'; Eccles (yellow card) 90+4'	Stadium: King Power Stadium; Attendance: 30,857; Referee: Oliver Langford
Note: Fixture was initially scheduled for a 15:00 kick-off, but was moved for live Sky Sports broadcast.

27 September 2025 7	Coventry City	3–0	Birmingham City	Coventry
12:30 BST	Thomas-Asante 16'; Wright (yellow card) 45+2'; Osayi-Samuel 49' (o.g.); Torp 78'	Report	Robinson (red card) 42'; Iwata (yellow card) 48'; Stansfield (yellow card) 64'	Stadium: Coventry Building Society Arena; Attendance: 30,585; Referee: Thomas Kirk
Note: Fixture was initially scheduled for a 15:00 kick-off, but was moved for live Sky Sports broadcast.

1 October 2025 8	Millwall	0–4	Coventry City	Bermondsey
20:00 BST	Bryan (yellow card) 17'; Mitchell (yellow card) 46'	Report	Wright 29', 66', (yellow card) 42'; Simms 81'; Van Ewijk (yellow card) 85'; Kesler-Hayden 87'	Stadium: The Den; Attendance: 14,802; Referee: Lewis Smith

4 October 2025 9	Sheffield Wednesday	0–5	Coventry City	Sheffield
12:30 BST	Iorfa (yellow card) 45+5'	Report	Thomas-Asante 3', 33'; Wright 45+6'; Dasilva (yellow card) 62'; Simms 68'; Sakamoto 75'	Stadium: Hillsborough Stadium; Attendance: 22,224; Referee: Adam Herczeg
Note: Fixture was initially scheduled for a 15:00 kick-off, but was moved for live Sky Sports broadcast.

18 October 2025 10	Coventry City	2–0	Blackburn Rovers	Coventry
15:00 BST	Torp 57'; Thomas-Asante 59'	Report	Tronstad (yellow card) 18'; Hedges (yellow card) 56'	Stadium: Coventry Building Society Arena; Attendance: 29,606; Referee: Sam Allison

21 October 2025 11	Portsmouth	1–2	Coventry City	Portsmouth
19:45 BST	Swift (yellow card) 85'; Kirk 90+6'	Report	Thomas-Asante 30', 56'; Van Ewijk (yellow card) 50'	Stadium: Fratton Park; Attendance: 20,321; Referee: Gavin Ward

25 October 2025 12	Coventry City	3–1	Watford	Coventry
12:30 BST	Thomas-Asante 3'; Allen 7'; Sakamoto 42'; Woolfenden (yellow card) 62'; Van Ewijk (yellow card) 76'; Kitching (yellow card) 85'	Report	Abankwah (red card) 44'; Doumbia (yellow card) 45+3'; Louza 69' (pen.); Irankunda (yellow card) 90+2'	Stadium: Coventry Building Society Arena; Attendance: 30,109; Referee: Dean Whitestone
Note: Fixture was initially scheduled for a 15:00 kick-off, but was moved for live Sky Sports broadcast.

31 October 2025 13	Wrexham	3–2	Coventry City	Wrexham
20:00 GMT	Sheaf (yellow card) 43'; Moore (yellow card) 54', (goal) 60', 69', 83'	Report	Mason-Clark 22'; Kitching (yellow card) 54'; Sakamoto 88'	Stadium: Racecourse Ground; Attendance: 10,617; Referee: Anthony Backhouse
Note: Fixture was initially scheduled for 1 November, but was moved for live Sky Sports broadcast.

4 November 2025 14	Coventry City	3–1	Sheffield United	Coventry
20:00 GMT	Dasilva (yellow card) 27'; Sakamoto (yellow card) 37', (goal) 49'; Thomas 60'; Torp (yellow card) 88'; Thomas-Asante 90+5'	Report	McCallum (yellow card) 11', (goal) 25'; Mee (yellow card) 68'	Stadium: Coventry Building Society Arena; Attendance: 29,589; Referee: James Linington
Note: Fixture was initially scheduled for a 19:45 kick-off, but was moved for live Sky Sports broadcast.

8 November 2025 15	Stoke City	0–1	Coventry City	Stoke-on-Trent
15:00 GMT	Thomas (yellow card) 32'; Pearson (yellow card) 67'; Tchamadeu (yellow card) 90+13'	Report	Wright (yellow card) 30'; Torp (yellow card) 81'; Mason-Clark 86'; Kesler-Hayden (yellow card) 90+8'	Stadium: Bet365 Stadium; Attendance: 27,421; Referee: John Busby

22 November 2025 16	Coventry City	3–2	West Bromwich Albion	Coventry
12:30 GMT	Torp (yellow card) 28', (goal) 61'; Mason-Clark (yellow card) 31'; Eccles 41'; Simms 56'	Report	Heggebø 9', 32'; Molumby (yellow card) 31' (yellow-red card) 49'; Phillips (yellow card) 69'	Stadium: Coventry Building Society Arena; Attendance: 29,216; Referee: Andrew Kitchen
Note: Fixture was initially scheduled for a 15:00 kick-off, but was moved for live Sky Sports broadcast.

25 November 2025 17	Middlesbrough	2–4	Coventry City	Middlesbrough
19:45 GMT	Whittaker 32'; Thomas 49' (o.g.)	Report	Simms 10', 86'; Kitching 14', 85'	Stadium: Riverside Stadium; Attendance: 26,726; Referee: Matt Donohue

29 November 2025 18	Coventry City	3–1	Charlton Athletic	Coventry
15:00 GMT	Eccles 40'; Simms 44', 76'; Thomas (yellow card) 89'	Report	Knibbs 13'; Ramsay (yellow card) 14'	Stadium: Coventry Building Society Arena; Attendance: 31,141; Referee: David Webb

6 December 2025 19	Ipswich Town	3–0	Coventry City	Ipswich
15:00 GMT	Hirst (yellow card) 15', (goal) 60'; Egeli 43', (yellow card) 56'; Walton (yellow card) 53'; Kipré (yellow card) 57'; Furlong (yellow card) 86'; Azón 90+5'	Report	Eccles (yellow card) 17'; Grimes (yellow card) 40'	Stadium: Portman Road; Attendance: 29,025; Referee: Paul Tierney

9 December 2025 20	Preston North End	1–1	Coventry City	Preston
19:45 GMT	Lindsay (red card) 39'; Jebbison (yellow card) 43', (goal) 76'	Report	Hughes 70' (o.g.)	Stadium: Deepdale; Attendance: 18,477; Referee: Ben Toner

13 December 2025 21	Coventry City	1–0	Bristol City	Coventry
15:00 GMT	Van Ewijk (yellow card) 57'; Mason-Clark 64'	Report	Borges (yellow card) 67'; Roberts (yellow card) 70'; Mehmeti (yellow card) 73'	Stadium: Coventry Building Society Arena; Attendance: 29,505; Referee: Stephen Martin

20 December 2025 22	Southampton	1–1	Coventry City	Southampton
12:30 GMT	Harwood-Bellis (yellow card) 36'; Wood 56'	Report	Grimes (yellow card) 26'; Mason-Clark 44'; Dasilva (red card) 47'	Stadium: St Mary's Stadium; Attendance: 30,584; Referee: Adam Herczeg
Note: Fixture was initially scheduled for a 15:00 kick-off, but was moved for live Sky Sports broadcast.

26 December 2025 23	Coventry City	1–0	Swansea City	Coventry
15:00 GMT	Mason-Clark 44'	Report	Stamenić (yellow card) 11'; Inoussa (yellow card) 63'	Stadium: Coventry Building Society Arena; Attendance: 30,139; Referee: Sam Allison

29 December 2025 24	Coventry City	0–2	Ipswich Town	Coventry
18:00 GMT	Kitching (yellow card) 18'	Report	Taylor (yellow card) 63'; J. Clarke 72'; Burns 83'; Furlong (yellow card) 88'	Stadium: Coventry Building Society Arena; Attendance: 31,213; Referee: Anthony Backhouse
Note: Fixture was initially scheduled for a 19:45 kick-off, but was moved for live Sky Sports broadcast.

1 January 2026 25	Charlton Athletic	1–1	Coventry City	Charlton
15:00 GMT	Burke (yellow card) 27'; Rankin-Costello 69'; Knibbs (yellow card) 73'; Bree (yellow card) 90+5'	Report	Simms 3'; Kitching (yellow card) 15'; Van Ewijk (yellow card) 42'	Stadium: The Valley; Attendance: 20,789; Referee: Josh Smith

4 January 2026 26	Birmingham City	3–2	Coventry City	Birmingham
12:00 GMT	Ducksch 6', 63', (yellow card) 36'; Koumas 17'; Wagner (yellow card) 51'; Beadle (yellow card) 88'	Report	Eccles 8', (yellow card) 86'; Simms 60'; Thomas (red card) 90+5'	Stadium: St Andrew's; Attendance: 27,932; Referee: James Linington
Note: Fixture was initially scheduled for a 15:00 kick-off, but was moved for live Sky Sports broadcast.

17 January 2026 27	Coventry City	2–1	Leicester City	Coventry
12:30 GMT	Simms 47'; Wright 85'; Dasilva (yellow card) 90+7'	Report	James 10', (yellow card) 90+5'; Monga (yellow card) 85'; Okoli (yellow card) 88'; Thomas (yellow card) 90+5'	Stadium: Coventry Building Society Arena; Attendance: 31,410; Referee: Lewis Smith
Note: Fixture was initially scheduled for a 15:00 kick-off, but was rescheduled for live Sky Sports broadcasting.

20 January 2026 28	Coventry City	2–1	Millwall	Coventry
19:45 GMT	Esse 11', (yellow card) 19'; Eccles (yellow card) 67'; Wright 78'	Report	Ivanović 29'; Sturge (yellow card) 73'	Stadium: Coventry Building Society Arena; Attendance: 28,605; Referee: Andrew Kitchen

26 January 2026 29	Norwich City	2–1	Coventry City	Norwich
20:00 GMT	Ben Slimane 46'; Córdoba (yellow card) 55'; Ahmed 67'; Chrisene (yellow card) 90+7'	Report	Esse (yellow card) 18', (goal) 38'	Stadium: Carrow Road; Attendance: 25,452; Referee: Thomas Kirk
Note: Fixture was initially scheduled for 24 January, but was rescheduled for live Sky Sports broadcasting.

31 January 2026 30	Queens Park Rangers	2–1	Coventry City	Shepherd's Bush
15:00 GMT	Kone (yellow card) 25', (goal) 66'; Norrington-Davies (yellow card) 62'; Madsen 73'	Report	Eccles 53'; Kitching (yellow card) 90+2'; Thomas (yellow card) 90+5'	Stadium: Loftus Road; Attendance: 17,321; Referee: Josh Smith

7 February 2026 31	Coventry City	0–0	Oxford United	Coventry
15:00 GMT	Sakamoto (yellow card) 41'	Report	Brown (yellow card) 34'; Long (yellow card) 45'; Brannagan (yellow card) 49'; Lankshear (yellow card) 59' (yellow-red card) 77'; Cumming (yellow card) 67'; Spencer (yellow card) 73'; Romenij (yellow card) 89'	Stadium: Coventry Building Society Arena; Attendance: 30,218; Referee: Ruebyn Ricardo

16 February 2026 32	Coventry City	3–1	Middlesbrough	Coventry
20:00 GMT	Wright 21', 55', 71' (pen.); Onyeka (yellow card) 27'; Sakamoto (yellow card) 49'; Grimes (yellow card) 72'	Report	Morris (yellow card) 22'; McGree 67'; Ayling (yellow card) 70'	Stadium: Coventry Building Society Arena; Attendance: 30,908; Referee: Thomas Bramall
Note: Fixture was initially scheduled for 14 February, but was rescheduled for live Sky Sports broadcasting.

21 February 2026 33	West Bromwich Albion	0–2	Coventry City	West Bromwich
12:30 GMT		Report	Mason-Clark 5'; Van Ewijk (yellow card) 16'; Sakamoto (yellow card) 17'; Rudoni 32'; Thomas (yellow card) 38'	Stadium: The Hawthorns; Attendance: 23,479; Referee: James Linington
Note: Fixture was initially scheduled for a 15:00 kick-off, but was rescheduled for live Sky Sports broadcasting.

25 February 2026 34	Sheffield United	1–2	Coventry City	Sheffield
19:45 GMT	Tanganga (yellow card) 9'; Burrows 48'; Brooks (yellow card) 83'; Campbell (yellow card) 84'	Report	Mason-Clark (yellow card) 9'; Wright 52'; Rudoni 57'; Dasilva (yellow card) 59'	Stadium: Bramall Lane; Attendance: 27,696; Referee: John Busby

28 February 2026 35	Coventry City	2–1	Stoke City	Coventry
15:00 GMT	Wright 12'; Thomas (yellow card) 90+1'; Rudoni 90+4'	Report	Gibson 45+4'; Simkin (yellow card) 90+3'	Stadium: Coventry Building Society Arena; Attendance: 31,516; Referee: Andrew Kitchen

7 March 2026 36	Bristol City	0–2	Coventry City	Bristol
15:00 GMT	Randell (yellow card) 29' (yellow-red card) 56'; Borges (yellow card) 45+7'; Eile (yellow card) 90+6'	Report	Sakamoto 37'; Latibeaudiere (red card) 43'; Mason-Clark (yellow card) 45'; Wright 45+6'; Grimes (yellow card) 78'	Stadium: Ashton Gate; Attendance: 23,492; Referee: Matt Donohue

11 March 2026 37	Coventry City	3–0	Preston North End	Coventry
20:00 GMT	Sakamoto 17'; Thomas-Asante 34'; Grimes 50' (pen.)	Report		Stadium: Coventry Building Society Arena; Attendance: 27,835; Referee: Lewis Smith
Note: Fixture was originally scheduled for a 19:45 kick-off, but was pushed back fifteen minutes for live Sky Sports broadcasting.

14 March 2026 38	Coventry City	1–2	Southampton	Coventry
12:30 GMT	Kitching (yellow card) 53'; Woolfenden (yellow card) 80'; Simms (yellow card) 86'; Torp 90+2' (pen.)	Report	Downes 48'; Matsuki 85'; Archer (yellow card) 86'; Peretz (yellow card) 90+1'	Stadium: Coventry Building Society Arena; Attendance: 31,281; Referee: Farai Hallam
Note: Fixture was initially scheduled for a 15:00 kick-off, but was brought forward for live Sky Sports broadcasting.

21 March 2026 39	Swansea City	0–3	Coventry City	Swansea
17:15 GMT	Galbraith (yellow card) 30'; Fulton (yellow card) 31'; Stamenić (yellow card) 89'	Report	Thomas-Asante 32' (pen.); Grimes 38'; Sakamoto 43'; Onyeka (yellow card) 72'	Stadium: Swansea.com Stadium; Attendance: 17,732; Referee: Stephen Martin
Note: Fixture was initially scheduled for a 15:00 kick-off, but was pushed back for Sky Sports broadcasting.

3 April 2026 40	Coventry City	3–2	Derby County	Coventry
20:00 BST	Onyeka 13'; Rudoni 68', 80'	Report	Travis (yellow card) 29'; Brereton 38', 77' (pen.); Agyemeng (yellow card) 81'	Stadium: Coventry Building Society Arena; Attendance: 31,349; Referee: Tom Nield
Note: Fixture was initially scheduled for a 15:00 kick-off, but was pushed back for Sky Sports broadcasting.

6 April 2026 41	Hull City	0–0	Coventry City	Kingston upon Hull
20:00 BST	Coyle (yellow card) 53'	Report	Grimes (yellow card) 61'	Stadium: MKM Stadium; Attendance: 22,507; Referee: David Webb
Note: Fixture was initially scheduled for a 15:00 kick-off, but was pushed back for Sky Sports broadcasting.

11 April 2026 42	Coventry City	0–0	Sheffield Wednesday	Coventry
12:30 BST		Report	Ingelsson (yellow card) 37'; Yates (yellow card) 54'; Charles (yellow card) 78'	Stadium: Coventry Building Society Arena; Attendance: 31,647; Referee: Matt Donohue
Note: Fixture was initially scheduled for a 15:00 kick-off, but was brought forward for live Sky Sports broadcasting.

17 April 2026 43	Blackburn Rovers	1–1	Coventry City	Blackburn
20:00 BST	Ohashi (yellow card) 7'; Ribeiro (yellow card) 51'; Morishita 54', (yellow card) 65'; Gardner-Hickman (yellow card) 65'	Report	Onyeka (yellow card) 51'; Thomas 84'	Stadium: Ewood Park; Attendance: 19,657; Referee: Lewis Smith
Note: Fixture was initially scheduled for 18 April, but was brought forward a day for live Sky Sports broadcasting.

21 April 2026 44	Coventry City	5–1	Portsmouth	Coventry
19:45 BST	Wright 12'; Mason-Clark 47', 76'; Poole 50' (o.g.); Kesler-Hayden 90+1'	Report	Dia (yellow card) 35'; Segečić 69'	Stadium: Coventry Building Society Arena; Attendance: 31,182; Referee: Andrew Kitchen

26 April 2026 45	Coventry City	3–1	Wrexham	Coventry
12:00 BST	Thomas-Asante 19'; Onyeka (yellow card) 29'; Eccles (yellow card) 50'; Torp 80'; Mason-Clark 90+4'	Report	Rathbone 25', (yellow card) 53'; M. James (yellow card) 40'	Stadium: Coventry Building Society Arena; Attendance: 31,003; Referee: Sam Allison
Note: Fixture was initially scheduled for 25 April, but was pushed back a day for live Sky Sports broadcasting.

2 May 2026 46	Watford	0–4	Coventry City	Watford
12:30 BST	Louza (yellow card) 25'; Irankunda (yellow card) 78'	Report	Simms 19', 43', 58'; Latibeaudiere (yellow card) 25'; Torp 85'	Stadium: Vicarage Road; Attendance: 19,174; Referee: Ruebyn Ricardo

=== FA Cup ===
Coventry were drawn away to Stoke City in the third round.

Win Draw Loss Fixtures

10 January 2026 Third round	Stoke City	1–0	Coventry City	Stoke-on-Trent
15:00 GMT	Talovierov (yellow card) 34'; Pearson (yellow card) 39'; Seko (yellow card) 43'; Cissé (yellow card) 67', (goal) 88'	Report	Kitching (yellow card) 37'	Stadium: Bet365 Stadium; Attendance: 13,894; Referee: Tom Niels

=== EFL Cup ===
Coventry were drawn at home against Luton Town in the first round and away to Millwall in the second round.

Win Draw Loss Fixtures

12 August 2025 First round	Coventry City	1–0	Luton Town	Coventry
19:45 BST	Simms 57'	Report	Holmes (yellow card) 40'	Stadium: Coventry Building Society Arena; Attendance: 10,595; Referee: Leigh Doughty

26 August 2025 Second round	Millwall	2–1	Coventry City	Bermondsey
19:45 BST	Grant (yellow card) 17', (goal) 76'; Luongo 33'; Mayor (yellow card) 71'	Report	Raphael (yellow card) 59'; Kitching (yellow card) 73'; Wright 89' (pen.)	Stadium: The Den; Attendance: 7,048; Referee: Stephen Martin

== Transfers and contracts ==
=== Transfers in ===
Date	Pos.	Nat.	Player	From	Fee	Ref.
1 July 2025 (Note: The transfer was announced on 19 June, and would become official on July 1 once his contract at Granada expired)	LB	(Spain)	Miguel Ángel Brau	(Spain) Granada	Free	
1 July 2025	RB	(England)	Kaine Kesler-Hayden	(England) Aston Villa	£3,500,000	
4 July 2025	GK	(England)	Oscar Varney	(England) Fulham	Free	
1 September 2025	CB	(England)	Luke Woolfenden	(England) Ipswich Town	£4,000,000	
23 January 2026	CB	(England)	Shay Dunn	(England) Merstham	Free	
27 January 2026	RW	(Suriname)	Jahnoah Markelo	(Switzerland) Zürich	Undisclosed	

Expenditure: ▼£7,500,000

=== Transfers out ===
Date	Pos.	Nat.	Player	To	Fee	Ref.
29 July 2025	CB	(England)	Luis Binks	(Denmark) Brøndby IF	£2,600,000	
1 September 2025	CDM	(England)	Ben Sheaf	(Wales) Wrexham	£6,500,000	
19 January 2026	CF	(Trinidad and Tobago)	Justin Obikwu	(England) Queens Park Rangers	£500,000	

Income: ▲£9,600,000

=== Loans in ===
Date	Pos.	Nat.	Player	From	Until	Ref.
24 July 2025	GK	(England)	Carl Rushworth	(England) Brighton & Hove Albion	31 May 2026	
6 January 2026	RW	(South Korea)	Yang Min-hyeok	(England) Tottenham Hotspur	31 May 2026	
7 January 2026	RW	(England)	Romain Esse	(England) Crystal Palace	31 May 2026	
2 February 2026	CM	(Nigeria)	Frank Onyeka	(England) Brentford	31 May 2026 (Note: Includes an obligation to buy)	

=== Loans out ===
Date	Pos.	Nat.	Player	To	Until	Ref.
10 July 2025	CM	(England)	Isaac Moore	(England) Forest Green Rovers	27 January 2026 (Note: On 27 January, Moore was recalled from his initial season-long loan at Forest Green Rovers)	
15 July 2025	LB	(England)	Harvey Broad	(England) Dagenham & Redbridge	31 May 2026	
4 August 2025	FW	(United States)	Aidan Dausch	(England) Forest Green Rovers	9 January 2026 (Note: On 9 January, Dausch was recalled from his season-long loan at Forest Green Rovers)	
29 August 2025	MF	(England)	Kai Yearn	(England) Maidenhead United	5 January 2026	
29 August 2025	GK	(England)	Bradley Collins	(England) Burton Albion	31 May 2026	
1 September 2025	FW	(Belgium)	Norman Bassette	(France) Reims	6 January 2026 (Note: On 6 January, Bassette was recalled from his season-long loan at Reims and subsequently joined 1. FC Kaiserslautern on loan.)	
1 September 2025	FW	(Trinidad and Tobago)	Justin Obikwu	(England) Lincoln City	17 January 2026 (Note: On 17 January, Obikwu was recalled from his initial season-long loan at Lincoln City)	
1 September 2025	RW	(Australia)	Raphael Borges Rodrigues	(England) Wigan Athletic	31 May 2026	
21 October 2025	FW	(England)	Elliot Betjemann	(England) St Albans City	2 January 2026	
23 October 2025	RB	(Grenada)	Greg Sandiford	(England) Bedford Town	31 May 2026 (Note: On 23 December, Sandiford's loan at Bedford was extended until the end of season.)	
6 January 2026	FW	(Belgium)	Norman Bassette	(Germany) 1. FC Kaiserslautern	31 May 2026	
15 January 2026	CB	(England)	Callum Perry	(England) Rochdale	31 May 2026 (Note: On 9 February, Perry's loan at Rochdale was extended until the end of the season)	
16 January 2026	CB	(England)	David Mantle	(England) Maidenhead United	31 May 2026	
21 January 2026	CAM	(England)	Kai Yearn	(England) Chesham United	20 March 2026 (Note: On 20 February, Yearn's loan at Chesham United was extended for another month)	
24 January 2026	LW	(England)	Rylie Siddall	(England) Gloucester City	31 May 2026 (Note: On 20 February, Siddall's loan at Gloucester City was extended until the end of the season)	
29 January 2026	CM	(Wales)	Kai Andrews	(Scotland) Hibernian	31 May 2026	
7 February 2026	FW	(United States)	Aidan Dausch	(England) Scunthorpe United	31 May 2026	
17 February 2026	CM	(England)	Isaac Moore	(England) Solihull Moors	31 May 2026 (Note: On 18 March, Moore's loan at Solihull Moors was extended until the end of the season)	
6 March 2026	CM	(England)	MacKenzie Stretton	(England) Gloucester City	31 May 2026	

=== Released / out of contract ===
Date	Pos.	Nat.	Player	Subsequent club	Join date	Ref.
30 June 2025	RB	(Scotland)	Jack Burroughs	(England) Northampton Town	1 July 2025	
30 June 2025	AM	(England)	Jamie Paterson	(England) Plymouth Argyle	1 July 2025	
30 June 2025	CF	(Portugal)	Fábio Tavares	(England) Burton Albion	1 July 2025	
30 June 2025	CM	(Wales)	Ryan Howley	(England) Bristol Rovers	8 July 2025	
30 June 2025	GK	(Wales)	Luis Lines	(England) Norwich City	11 July 2025	
30 June 2025	FW	(England)	Aston Ellard	(England) Barnsley	15 July 2025	
30 June 2025	GK	(England)	Dan Rachel	(England) Nuneaton Town	23 August 2025	
30 June 2025	DF	(England)	Jayden Smith	(United States) Fort Wayne	4 February 2026	
30 June 2025	DF	(England)	Kain Ryan	Unattached	Released	
30 June 2025	GK	(Wales)	Cian Tyler	Retired	Released	

=== New contracts ===
Date	Pos.	Nat.	Player	Contracted until	Ref.
28 May 2025	CM	(England)	Jamie Allen	30 June 2026	
28 May 2025	GK	(England)	Luke Bell	30 June 2026	
30 June 2025	CB	(England)	Tristen Batanwi	30 June 2026	
30 June 2025	CF	(England)	Elliot Betjemann	30 June 2026	
30 June 2025	CB	(England)	Riccardo Di Trolio	30 June 2026	
30 June 2025	CM	(England)	Charlie Finney	30 June 2026	
30 June 2025	CM	(England)	Isaac Moore	30 June 2028	
30 June 2025	RB	(Grenada)	Greg Sandiford	30 June 2026	
30 June 2025	LW	(England)	Rylie Siddall	30 June 2026	
30 June 2025	AM	(England)	Kai Yearn	30 June 2026	
4 July 2025	LW	(England)	Conrad Ambursley	30 June 2026	
4 July 2025	CB	(England)	Joshua Gordon	30 June 2026	
4 July 2025	CM	(England)	Jack James	30 June 2026	
4 July 2025	CB	(England)	David Mantle	30 June 2026	
4 July 2025	CM	(England)	Joseph McCallum	30 June 2026	
4 July 2025	CM	(England)	MacKenzie Stretton	30 June 2026	
19 February 2026	LB	(Wales)	Jay Dasilva	Undisclosed	
19 February 2026	CB	(England)	Liam Kitching	Undisclosed	
19 February 2026	RB	(Netherlands)	Milan van Ewijk	Undisclosed	

== Squad information ==
=== Squad details ===
No.	Player	Position	Nationality	Place of birth	Date of birth (age) *	Club apps *	Club goals *	Signed from	Date signed	Fee	Contract end
Goalkeepers
1	Oliver Dovin	GK	(Sweden) (England)	London	8 July 2002 (aged 22)	30	0	Hammarby IF	19 July 2024	Undisclosed	30 June 2028
13	Ben Wilson	GK	(England)	Stanley	9 August 1992 (aged 32)	120	1	Bradford City	1 July 2019	Free	30 June 2027
19	Carl Rushworth	GK	(England)	Halifax	2 July 2001 (aged 23)	0	0	Brighton & Hove Albion	24 July 2025	Loan	30 June 2027
48	Luke Bell	GK	(England)		1 March 2004 (aged 21)	0	0	Academy	1 July 2022	—N/a	30 June 2027
51	Oscar Varney	GK	(England)		1 October 2006 (aged 18)	0	0	Fulham	4 July 2015	—N/a	30 June 2027
Defenders
3	Jay Dasilva	LB	(Wales) (England)	Luton	22 April 1998 (aged 27)	79	0	Bristol City	1 July 2023	Free	30 June 2027
4	Bobby Thomas	CB	(England)	Chester	30 January 2001 (aged 24)	94	7	Burnley	22 July 2023	Undisclosed	30 June 2027
15	Liam Kitching	CB	(England) (Republic of Ireland)	Harrogate	25 October 1999 (aged 25)	65	2	Barnsley	1 September 2023	Undisclosed	30 June 2027
20	Kaine Kesler-Hayden	RB	(England)	Birmingham	22 October 2002 (aged 22)	0	0	Aston Villa	1 July 2025	£3,500,000	30 June 2029
21	Jake Bidwell	LB	(England)	Southport	21 March 1993 (aged 32)	136	3	Swansea City	17 January 2022	Free	30 June 2027
22	Joel Latibeaudiere	CB	(Jamaica) (England)	Doncaster	6 January 2000 (aged 25)	84	4	Swansea City	18 July 2023	Compensation	30 June 2027
26	Luke Woolfenden	CB	(England)	Ipswich	21 October 1998 (aged 26)	0	0	Ipswich Town	1 September 2025	£4,000,000	30 June 2028
27	Milan van Ewijk	RB	(Netherlands) (Suriname)	Amsterdam	8 September 2000 (aged 24)	100	4	Heerenveen	27 July 2023	Undisclosed	30 June 2027
33	Miguel Ángel Brau	LB	(Spain)	Cartagena	27 December 2001 (aged 23)	0	0	Granada	1 July 2025	Free	30 June 2029
50	Riccardo Di Trolio	CB	(Italy) (England)	Camden	14 August 2005 (aged 19)	0	0	St Albans City	26 January 2023	Free	30 June 2026
53	Greg Sandiford	RB	(Grenada) (England)	Luton	7 May 2005 (aged 20)	0	0	Cambridge United	3 July 2024	Free	30 June 2026
Midfielders
5	Jack Rudoni	CM	(England)	Carshalton	14 June 2001 (aged 24)	50	10	Huddersfield Town	20 June 2024	Undisclosed	30 June 2028
6	Matt Grimes	CM	(England)	Exeter	15 July 1995 (aged 29)	18	2	Swansea City	31 January 2025	Undisclosed	30 June 2028
7	Tatsuhiro Sakamoto	RW	(Japan)	Tokyo	22 October 1996 (aged 28)	80	11	KV Oostende	10 July 2023	Undisclosed	30 June 2027
8	Jamie Allen	CM	(England)	Rochdale	29 January 1995 (aged 30)	175	11	Burton Albion	1 July 2019	Undisclosed	30 June 2026
10	Ephron Mason-Clark	LW	(Jamaica) (England)	Lambeth	25 August 1999 (aged 25)	34	6	Peterborough United	1 February 2024	Undisclosed	30 June 2028
14	Romain Esse	RW	(England) (Ivory Coast)	Lambeth	13 May 2005 (aged 20)	0	0	Crystal Palace	7 January 2026	Loan	30 June 2026
16	Frank Onyeka	DM	(Nigeria)	Abuja	16 January 2000 (aged 25)	0	0	Brentford	2 February 2026	Loan	30 June 2026
18	Yang Min-hyeok	RW	(South Korea)	Gwangju	16 April 2006 (aged 19)	0	0	Tottenham Hotspur	6 January 2026	Loan	30 June 2026
24	Jahnoah Markelo	RB	(Suriname) (Netherlands)	Amsterdam	4 October 2003 (aged 21)	0	0	Zürich	27 January 2026	Undisclosed	30 June 2030
28	Josh Eccles	CM	(England)	Coventry	6 April 2000 (aged 25)	162	5	Academy	1 July 2018	—N/a	30 June 2028
29	Victor Torp	CM	(Denmark)	Lemvig	30 July 1999 (aged 25)	61	7	Sarpsborg	11 January 2024	Undisclosed	30 June 2028
50	George Shepherd	AM	(England)	Coventry		0	0	Academy	1 July 2025	—N/a	30 June 2026
54	Kai Andrews	LW	(Wales) (England)	Birmingham	6 August 2006 (aged 18)	2	0	Academy	1 July 2022	—N/a	30 June 2026
Forwards
9	Ellis Simms	CF	(England)	Oldham	5 January 2001 (aged 24)	99	26	Everton	7 July 2023	Undisclosed	30 June 2027
11	Haji Wright	FW	(United States) (Liberia)	Los Angeles	27 March 1998 (aged 27)	81	31	Antalyaspor	4 August 2023	£7,700,000	30 June 2027
23	Brandon Thomas-Asante	FW	(Ghana) (England)	Milton Keynes	29 December 1998 (aged 26)	43	6	West Bromwich Albion	1 August 2024	Undisclosed	30 June 2028
Out on loan
17	Raphael	RW	(Australia) (Brazil)	Maastricht	11 September 2003 (aged 21)	5	0	Macarthur	14 June 2024	Undisclosed	30 June 2028
37	Norman Bassette	FW	(Belgium)	Arlon	9 November 2004 (aged 20)	29	2	Caen	21 August 2024	Undisclosed	30 June 2028
40	Bradley Collins	GK	(England)	Southampton	18 February 1997 (aged 28)	46	0	Barnsley	17 July 2023	Undisclosed	30 June 2026
51	Harvey Broad	LB	(England)		1 September 2005 (aged 19)	0	0	Chatham Town	11 July 2024	Undisclosed	30 June 2026
59	Aidan Dausch	FW	(England) (United States)	London	1 June 2006 (aged 19)	2	0	Academy	1 July 2023	—N/a	30 June 2026
Left before the end of the season
14	Ben Sheaf	DM	(England)	Dartford	5 February 1998 (aged 27)	176	9	Arsenal	1 July 2021	Undisclosed	30 June 2026
49	Justin Obikwu	CF	(Trinidad and Tobago) (England)	Brent	18 February 2004 (aged 21)	0	0	Academy	1 July 2022	—N/a	30 June 2026

Last updated: 1 August 2025.
Source: Coventry City

* Player age and appearances/goals for the club as of beginning of 2025–26 season.

=== Appearances ===
As of match played 2 May 2026

Players with no appearances are not included on the list

Number	Nationality	Player	Position	Championship	FA Cup	EFL Cup	Total
3	(Wales)	Jay Dasilva	DF	41+1		0+1	43
4	(England)	Bobby Thomas	DF	33		2	35
5	(England)	Jack Rudoni	MF	24+6	1	0+2	33
6	(England)	Matt Grimes	MF	46		1+1	48
7	(Japan)	Tatsuhiro Sakamoto	MF	29+6	0+1	0+1	37
8	(England)	Jamie Allen	MF	4+19		2	25
9	(England)	Ellis Simms	FW	15+28	0+1	2	46
10	(Jamaica)	Ephron Mason-Clark	MF	36+6	0+1		43
11	(United States)	Haji Wright	FW	31+9	1	1+1	43
13	(England)	Ben Wilson	GK		1	2	3
14	(England)	Romain Esse	MF	8+9	1		18
15	(England)	Liam Kitching	DF	37+1	1	0+2	41
16	(Nigeria)	Frank Onyeka	MF	13+1			14
17	(Australia)	Raphael	MF	0+2		2	4
18	(South Korea)	Yang Min-hyeok	MF	0+3	1		4
19	(England)	Carl Rushworth	GK	46			46
20	(England)	Kaine Kesler-Hayden	DF	5+17		2	24
21	(England)	Jake Bidwell	DF	3+8	1	2	14
22	(Jamaica)	Joel Latibeaudiere	DF	15	1		16
23	(Ghana)	Brandon Thomas-Asante	FW	21+11		1+1	34
24	(Suriname)	Jahnoah Markelo	MF	0+5			5
26	(England)	Luke Woolfenden	DF	11+6	1		18
27	(Netherlands)	Milan van Ewijk	DF	43+1	0+1		45
28	(England)	Josh Eccles	MF	19+15	1		35
29	(Denmark)	Victor Torp	MF	25+14		1+1	41
33	(Spain)	Miguel Ángel Brau	DF	1+8		2	11
54	(Wales)	Kai Andrews	MF	0+7	1	2	10
Player(s) who featured but departed the club permanently during the season:
14	(England)	Ben Sheaf	MF	0+1			1

=== Goalscorers ===
As of match played 2 May 2026

Number	Nationality	Player	Position	Championship	FA Cup	EFL Cup	Total
11	(United States)	Haji Wright	FW	17	0	1	18
9	(England)	Ellis Simms	FW	13	0	1	14
23	(Ghana)	Brandon Thomas-Asante	FW	13	0	0	13
10	(Jamaica)	Ephron Mason-Clark	MF	10	0	0	10
29	(Denmark)	Victor Torp	MF	10	0	0	10
5	(England)	Jack Rudoni	MF	7	0	0	7
7	(Japan)	Tatsuhiro Sakamoto	MF	7	0	0	7
28	(England)	Josh Eccles	MF	4	0	0	4
4	(England)	Bobby Thomas	DF	3	0	0	3
6	(England)	Matt Grimes	MF	2	0	0	2
14	(England)	Romain Esse	MF	2	0	0	2
15	(England)	Liam Kitching	DF	2	0	0	2
20	(England)	Kaine Kesler-Hayden	DF	2	0	0	2
8	(England)	Jamie Allen	MF	1	0	0	1
16	(Nigeria)	Frank Onyeka	MF	1	0	0	1
Own goals				3	0	0	3
Totals				97	0	2	99

=== Yellow cards ===
As of match played 2 May 2026

Number	Nationality	Player	Position	Championship	FA Cup	EFL Cup	Total
15	(England)	Liam Kitching	DF	7	1	1	9
27	(Netherlands)	Milan van Ewijk	DF	8	0	0	8
4	(England)	Bobby Thomas	DF	7	0	0	7
3	(Wales)	Jay Dasilva	DF	6	0	0	6
6	(England)	Matt Grimes	MF	6	0	0	6
28	(England)	Josh Eccles	MF	6	0	0	6
7	(Japan)	Tatsuhiro Sakamoto	FW	4	0	0	4
11	(United States)	Haji Wright	FW	4	0	0	4
29	(Denmark)	Victor Torp	MF	4	0	0	4
16	(Nigeria)	Frank Onyeka	MF	4	0	0	4
10	(Jamaica)	Ephron Mason-Clark	MF	3	0	0	3
14	(England)	Romain Esse	MF	2	0	0	2
19	(England)	Carl Rushworth	DF	2	0	0	2
26	(England)	Luke Woolfenden	DF	2	0	0	2
9	(England)	Ellis Simms	FW	1	0	0	1
17	(Australia)	Raphael	FW	0	0	1	1
20	(England)	Kaine Kesler-Hayden	DF	1	0	0	1
21	(England)	Jake Bidwell	DF	1	0	0	1
22	(Jamaica)	Joel Latibeaudiere	DF	1	0	0	1
Totals				68	1	2	72

=== Red cards ===
As of match played 7 March 2026

Number	Nationality	Player	Position	Championship	FA Cup	EFL Cup	Total
3	(Wales)	Jay Dasilva	DF	1	0	0	1
4	(England)	Bobby Thomas	DF	1	0	0	1
22	(Jamaica)	Joel Latibeaudiere	DF	1	0	0	1
Totals				3	0	0	3

=== Captains ===
As of match played 2 May 2026

Number	Nationality	Player	Position	Championship	FA Cup	EFL Cup	Total
6	(England)	Matt Grimes	MF	42	0	0	42
15	(England)	Liam Kitching	DF	4	1	0	5
21	(England)	Jake Bidwell	DF	0	0	2	2
Totals				46	1	2	49

=== Penalties awarded ===
Number	Nationality	Player	Position	Date	Opponents	Ground	Success
11	(United States)	Haji Wright	FW	16 August 2025	Derby County	Pride Park Stadium	✓
11	(United States)	Haji Wright	FW	26 August 2025	Millwall	The Den	✓
11	(United States)	Haji Wright	FW	16 February 2026	Middlesbrough	Coventry Building Society Arena	✓
6	(England)	Matt Grimes	MF	11 March 2026	Preston North End	Coventry Building Society Arena	✓
29	(Denmark)	Victor Torp	MF	14 March 2026	Southampton	Coventry Building Society Arena	✓
23	(Ghana)	Brandon Thomas-Asante	FW	21 March 2026	Swansea City	Swansea.com Stadium	✓

=== Hat-tricks ===
Number	Nationality	Player	Position	Date	Opponents	Ground	Result
11	(United States)	Haji Wright	FW	16 February 2026	Middlesbrough	Coventry Building Society Arena	3–1
9	(England)	Ellis Simms	FW	2 May 2026	Watford	Vicarage Road	0–4

=== Suspensions served ===
Number	Nationality	Player	Position	Date suspended	Reason	Matches missed
27	(Netherlands)	Milan van Ewijk	DF	31 October 2025	5 yellow cards	Wrexham (A)
3	(Wales)	Jay Dasilva	DF	20 December 2025	1 red card vs. Southampton	Swansea City (H); Ipswich Town (H); Charlton Athletic (A)
4	(England)	Bobby Thomas	DF	17 January 2026	1 red card vs. Birmingham City	Stoke City (A); Leicester City (H); Millwall (H)
23	(Ghana)	Brandon Thomas-Asante	FW	30 January 2026	Retrospective vs. Norwich City	Queens Park Rangers (A); Oxford City (H); Middlesbrough (H)
22	(Jamaica)	Joel Latibeaudiere	DF	7 March 2026	1 red card vs. Bristol City	Preston North End (H)

=== Monthly & weekly awards ===
Number	Nationality	Player	Position	Date	Award	Ref
10	(Jamaica)	Ephron Mason-Clark	MF	18 August 2025	EFL Championship Team of the Week	
5	(England)	Jack Rudoni	MF	26 August 2025	EFL Championship Team of the Week	
11	(United States)	Haji Wright	FW	26 August 2025	EFL Championship Team of the Week	
23	(Ghana)	Brandon Thomas-Asante	FW	26 August 2025	EFL Championship Team of the Week	
29	(Denmark)	Victor Torp	MF	26 August 2025	EFL Championship Team of the Week	
19	(England)	Carl Rushworth	GK	23 September 2025	EFL Championship Team of the Week	
4	(England)	Bobby Thomas	DF	6 October 2025	EFL Championship Team of the Week	
6	(England)	Matt Grimes	MF	6 October 2025	EFL Championship Team of the Week	
11	(United States)	Haji Wright	FW	6 October 2025	EFL Championship Team of the Week	
23	(Ghana)	Brandon Thomas-Asante	FW	6 October 2025	EFL Championship Team of the Week	
23	(Ghana)	Brandon Thomas-Asante	FW	20 October 2025	EFL Championship Team of the Week	
27	(Netherlands)	Milan van Ewijk	DF	20 October 2025	EFL Championship Team of the Week	
29	(Denmark)	Victor Torp	MF	20 October 2025	EFL Championship Team of the Week	
7	(Japan)	Tatsuhiro Sakamoto	FW	3 November 2025	EFL Championship Team of the Week	
4	(England)	Bobby Thomas	DF	6 November 2025	EFL Championship Team of the Week	
11	(United States)	Haji Wright	FW	6 November 2025	EFL Championship Team of the Week	
	(England)	Frank Lampard	Manager	14 November 2025	EFL Championship Manager of the Month	
23	(Ghana)	Brandon Thomas-Asante	FW	14 November 2025	EFL Championship Player of the Month	
9	(England)	Ellis Simms	FW	2 December 2025	EFL Championship Team of the Week	
29	(Denmark)	Victor Torp	MF	2 December 2025	EFL Championship Team of the Week	
	(England)	Frank Lampard	Manager	14 November 2025	EFL Championship Manager of the Month	
9	(England)	Ellis Simms	FW	14 November 2025	EFL Championship Player of the Month	
10	(Jamaica)	Ephron Mason-Clark	MF	16 December 2025	EFL Championship Team of the Week	
19	(England)	Carl Rushworth	GK	16 December 2025	EFL Championship Team of the Week	
19	(England)	Carl Rushworth	GK	22 December 2025	EFL Championship Team of the Week	
19	(England)	Carl Rushworth	GK	19 January 2026	EFL Championship Team of the Week	
11	(United States)	Haji Wright	FW	17 February 2026	EFL Championship Team of the Week	
16	(Nigeria)	Frank Onyeka	MF	27 April 2026	EFL Championship Team of the Week	

=== End-of-season awards ===
Number	Nationality	Player	Position	Date	Award	Ref
6	(England)	Matt Grimes	MF	19 April 2026	EFL Awards Team of the Season	
11	(United States)	Haji Wright	FW	19 April 2026	EFL Awards Team of the Season	
19	(England)	Carl Rushworth	GK	19 April 2026	EFL Awards Team of the Season	
27	(Netherlands)	Milan van Ewijk	DF	19 April 2026	EFL Awards Team of the Season	
	(England)	Frank Lampard	Manager	19 April 2026	EFL Awards Manager of the Season	
6	(England)	Matt Grimes	MF	28 April 2026	CCFPA Player of the Season Award	
11	(United States)	Haji Wright	FW	3 May 2026	CCFC Top Goalscorer	
19	(England)	Carl Rushworth	GK	3 May 2026	CCFC Player of the Season	
19	(England)	Carl Rushworth	GK	3 May 2026	CCFC Players' Player of the Season	
19	(England)	Carl Rushworth	GK	3 May 2026	CCFC Young Player of the Season	
20	(England)	Kaine Kesler-Hayden	DF	3 May 2026	CCFC Community Player of the Season	
9	(England)	Ellis Simms	FW	3 May 2026	CCFC Goal of the Season	
	(England)	Frank Lampard	Manager	26 May 2026	LMA Awards Manager of the Year (Championship)	
	(England)	Frank Lampard	Manager	26 May 2026	LMA Awards Manager of the Year (Overall)	
4	(England)	Bobby Thomas	DF	25 August 2026	PFA Championship Team of the Year	
5	(England)	Jack Rudoni	MF	25 August 2026	PFA Championship Team of the Year	
6	(England)	Matt Grimes	MF	25 August 2026	PFA Championship Team of the Year	
11	(United States)	Haji Wright	FW	25 August 2026	PFA Championship Team of the Year	
19	(England)	Carl Rushworth	GK	25 August 2026	PFA Championship Team of the Year	
27	(Netherlands)	Milan van Ewijk	DF	25 August 2026	PFA Championship Team of the Year	
