= 2026–27 Coventry City F.C. season =

Coventry City
2026–27 season
- Owner: Doug King
- Executive chairman: Doug King
- Head coach: Frank Lampard
- Stadium: Coventry Building Society Arena
- Premier League: 17th
- FA Cup: Third round
- EFL Cup: Third round
- Top goalscorer: League: Jack Rudoni (3); All: Jack Rudoni (4)
- Highest home attendance: 31,492 v Brighton & Hove Albion; 13 September 2026, Premier League
- Lowest home attendance: 24,577 v Aston Villa; 16 September 2026, EFL Cup
- Biggest win: 4–1 v Newcastle United (H); 12 October 2026, Premier League
- Biggest defeat: 0–5 v Brighton & Hove Albion (H); 13 September 2026, Premier League
Home colours	Away colours	Third colours

The 2026–27 season is the 143rd season in the history of Coventry City Football Club and their first season back in the Premier League, marking their return to the top flight for the first time since 2001. In addition to the domestic league, the club is also participating in the FA Cup and the EFL Cup.

== Pre-season friendlies ==
On 13 May, Coventry announced their first pre-season fixture, against Northampton Town. On 2 July, a home friendly against Espanyol was confirmed. On 17 July, a second home friendly was added against Ligue 1 side Monaco.

Win Draw Loss Fixtures

12 July 2026 Friendly	AFC Wimbledon	3–2	Coventry City	Marbella, Spain
13:00 CEST	Browne; Sasu; Hedges	Report	Bassette; van Ewijk	Stadium: Marbella Football Center; Attendance: 0 (BCD)

18 July 2026 Friendly	Northampton Town	0–0	Coventry City	Sixfields
14:00 BST		Report		Stadium: Sixfields Stadium

1 August 2026 Friendly	Leicester City	0–1	Coventry City	Seagrave
16:00 BST		Report	Latibeaudiere 80'	Stadium: LCFC Training Facility; Attendance: 0 (Behind Closed Doors)

4 August 2026 Friendly	West Bromwich Albion	1–1	Coventry City	West Bromwich
TBD BST	Morgan 41'	Report	Tchaouna 26'	Stadium: The Hawthorns; Attendance: 0 (Behind Closed Doors)

8 August 2026 Friendly	Coventry City	3–1	(Spain) Espanyol	Coventry
17:30 BST	Sakamoto 69'; Eccles 75'; Simms 84'	Report	Fernández 26'	Stadium: Coventry Building Society Arena; Referee: Peter Bankes

14 August 2026 Friendly	Coventry City	2–0	(France) Monaco	Coventry
19:00 BST	Simms 12'; Tchaouna 32'	Report		Stadium: Coventry Building Society Arena; Attendance: 14,875

== Competitions ==
=== Overall record ===
Competition	First match	Last match	Starting round	Final position	Record							
Competition	First match	Last match	Starting round	Final position	Pld	W	D	L	GF	GA	GD	Win %
Premier League	21 August 2026	30 May 2027	Matchday 1	TBD	10	3	0	7	10	19	−9	30.00
FA Cup	8–11 January 2027	TBD	Third round	TBD	0	0	0	0	0	0	+0	—
EFL Cup	25 August 2026	16 September 2026	Second round	Third round	2	1	0	1	5	5	+0	50.00
Total					12	4	0	8	15	24	−9	33.33

Last updated: 6 November 2026
Source: Soccerway

=== Premier League ===
==== League table ====
Pos	Team	Pld	W	D	L	GF	GA	GD	Pts
11	Aston Villa	11	3	5	3	14	17	−3	14
12	Newcastle United	11	3	4	4	15	18	−3	13
13	Coventry City	11	4	0	7	13	21	−8	12
14	Hull City	10	2	5	3	11	11	0	11
15	Fulham	11	2	5	4	11	13	−2	11

Updated to match(es) played on 21 November 2026. Source: Premier League
Rules for classification: 1) Points; 2) Goal difference; 3) Goals scored; 4) If the champions, relegated teams or qualified teams for UEFA competitions cannot be determined by rules 1 to 3 following the completion of the competition, rules 4.1 to 4.3 are applied between such teams – 4.1) Head-to-head points; 4.2) Head-to-head away goals; 4.3) Play-off at a neutral site.

==== Results summary ====
Overall								Home						Away					
Pld	W	D	L	GF	GA	GD	Pts	W	D	L	GF	GA	GD	W	D	L	GF	GA	GD
11	4	0	7	13	21	−8	12	3	0	3	10	11	−1	1	0	4	3	10	−7

Last updated: 21 November 2026.
Source: Soccerway

==== Results by round ====
Round	1	2	3	4	5	6	7	8	9	10	11	12	13	14	15	16	17	18	19	20	21	22	23
Ground	A	H	A	H	A	H	A	H	H	A	H	A	H	A	H	A	H	H	A	A	H	A	H
Result	L	L	L	L	W	W	L	L	W	L	W												
Position	18	17	20	20	18	14	17	19	16	17													
Points	0	0	0	0	3	6	6	6	9	9	12												

Updated to match(es) played on 21 November 2026. Source: Premier League
A = Away; H = Home; W = Win; D = Draw; L = Loss; P = Postponed

==== Matches ====
The Premier League fixtures were released on 19 June 2026.

Win Draw Loss Fixtures

21 August 2026 1	Arsenal	3–0	Coventry City	Holloway
20:00 BST	Havertz 15'; Saka 23'; Gabriel (yellow card) 34'; Ødegaard 49'	Report	Yirenkyi (yellow card) 27'	Stadium: Emirates Stadium; Attendance: 60,098; Referee: Thomas Bramall

29 August 2026 2	Coventry City	0–1	Hull City	Coventry
15:00 BST	Amenda (yellow card) 84'	Report	Coyle (yellow card) 10'; Slater (yellow card) 51'; Stroud (yellow card) 54'; McBurnie (yellow card) 68'; Millar 82'	Stadium: Coventry Building Society Arena; Attendance: 31,239; Referee: Josh Smith

5 September 2026 3	Manchester City	1–0	Coventry City	Manchester
15:00 BST	Haaland 26'; Khusanov (yellow card) 90+5'	Report	Van Ewijk (yellow card) 19'; Pinnock (yellow card) 90+2'	Stadium: Etihad Stadium; Attendance: 60,765; Referee: Paul Tierney

13 September 2026 4	Coventry City	0–5	Brighton & Hove Albion	Coventry
14:00 BST	Awoniyi (red card) 53'	Report	Kostoulas 35'; Yalcouyé 51'; Groß 70' (pen.); Dunk 83'; Ayari 90+4'	Stadium: Coventry Building Society Arena; Attendance: 31,492; Referee: Tony Harrington
Note: Fixture was initially scheduled for 12 September, but was rescheduled for live Sky Sports.

19 September 2026 5	Nottingham Forest	0–1	Coventry City	West Bridgford
17:30 BST	Delap (yellow card) 59'; Jair (yellow card) 90+4'	Report	Dasilva 55'	Stadium: City Ground; Attendance: 30,666; Referee: Jarred Gillett
Note: Fixture was initially scheduled for a 15:00 kick-off, but was pushed back for live Sky Sports.

12 October 2026 6	Coventry City	4–1	Newcastle United	Coventry
20:00 BST	Rudoni 6' (pen.); Cherif 48'; Van Ewijk (yellow card) 66'; Simms 81'; Mfuni 86'	Report	Botman 70'; Joelinton (yellow card) 81'	Stadium: Coventry Building Society Arena; Attendance: 30,811; Referee: John Brooks
Note: Fixture was initially scheduled for 10 October, but was rescheduled for live Sky Sports.

19 October 2026 7	Tottenham Hotspur	3–1	Coventry City	Tottenham
20:00 BST	Maddison 14'; Solanke (yellow card) 22'; Marmoush 58'; Davies 90+6'	Report	Yirenkyi (yellow card) 20'; Dasilva (yellow card) 45'; Rudoni 49', (yellow card) 64'	Stadium: Tottenham Hotspur Stadium; Attendance: 60,913; Referee: Andy Madley
Note: Fixture was initially scheduled for 17 October, but was rescheduled for live Sky Sports.

24 October 2026 8	Coventry City	0–1	Fulham	Coventry
15:00 BST		Report	Charles (yellow card) 36'; Bobb 80'; Robinson (yellow card) 82'	Stadium: Coventry Building Society Arena; Attendance: 31,449; Referee: Adam Herczeg

31 October 2026 9	Coventry City	3–1	Sunderland	Coventry
15:00 GMT	Torp (yellow card) 7'; Sakamoto 17', (yellow card) 55'; Awoniyi 37'; Rudoni 52'	Report	Le Fée 67' (pen.); Alderete (yellow card) 90+4' (yellow-red card) 90+9'	Stadium: Coventry Building Society Arena; Attendance: 31,455; Referee: Simon Hooper

6 November 2026 10	Everton	3–1	Coventry City	Liverpool
20:00 GMT	Barry 56', 61'; Dewsbury-Hall 81'; Branthwaite (yellow card) 88'	Report	Gboho 52'; Yirenkyi (yellow card) 89'	Stadium: Hill Dickinson Stadium; Attendance: 52,395; Referee: Stuart Attwell
Note: Fixture was initially scheduled for 7 November, but was brought forward to the night prior for live Sky Sports broadcasting.

21 November 2026 11	Coventry City	3–2	Crystal Palace	Coventry
15:00 GMT	Awoniyi 5'; Sakamoto 30'; Grimes (yellow card) 61'; McNeil 85' (o.g.)	Report	Pino 13', (yellow card) 75'; Wharton (yellow card) 36'; Larsen 45+1'	Stadium: Coventry Building Society Arena; Attendance: 31,209; Referee: Darren England

28 November 2026 12	Leeds United	v	Coventry City	Leeds
15:00 GMT		Report		Stadium: Elland Road

1 December 2026 13	Coventry City	v	Ipswich Town	Coventry
20:00 GMT		Report		Stadium: Coventry Building Society Arena
Note: Fixture was initially scheduled for 2 December, but was brought forward a day for live Sky Sports broadcasting.

5 December 2026 14	Manchester United	v	Coventry City	Trafford
15:00 GMT		Report		Stadium: Old Trafford

13 December 2026 15	Coventry City	v	Aston Villa	Coventry
16:30 GMT				Stadium: Coventry Building Society Arena
Note: Fixture was initially scheduled for 12 December, but was pushed back a day for live Sky Sports broadcasting.

19 December 2026 16	Bournemouth	v	Coventry City	Bournemouth
15:00 GMT				Stadium: Dean Court

26 December 2026 17	Coventry City	v	Chelsea	Coventry
15:00 GMT				Stadium: Coventry Building Society Arena
Note: Fixture was initially scheduled for 26 December, but was pushed back a day for live Sky Sports broadcasting.

30 December 2026 18	Coventry City	v	Brentford	Coventry
19:30 GMT				Stadium: Coventry Building Society Arena
Note: Fixture was initially scheduled for a 15:00 kick-off, but was pushed back for live Sky Sports broadcasting.

2 January 2027 19	Liverpool	v	Coventry City	Liverpool
15:00 GMT				Stadium: Anfield

6 January 2027 20	Ipswich Town	v	Coventry City	Ipswich
19:30 GMT				Stadium: Portman Road
Note: Fixture was initially scheduled for a 15:00 kick-off, but was pushed back for live Sky Sports broadcasting.

16 January 2026 21	Coventry City	v	Everton	Coventry
12:30 GMT				Stadium: Coventry Building Society Arena
Note: Fixture was initially scheduled for a 15:00 kick-off, but was brought forward for live TNT Sports broadcasting.

24 January 2027 22	Sunderland	v	Coventry City	Sunderland
14:00 GMT				Stadium: Stadium of Light
Note: Fixture was initially scheduled for 23 January, but was pushed back a day due to Sunderland's participation in the UEFA Europa League the preceding Thursday.

31 January 2027 23	Coventry City	v	Leeds United	Coventry
14:00 GMT				Stadium: Coventry Building Society Arena
Note: Fixture was initially scheduled for 30 January, but was pushed back a day for live Sky Sports broadcasting.

=== EFL Cup ===
Coventry City entered the EFL Cup in the second round, and were drawn away against Plymouth Argyle. They were then drawn at home to Aston Villa in the third round.

Win Draw Loss Fixtures

25 August 2026 Second round	Plymouth Argyle	2–4	Coventry City	Plymouth
19:45 BST	Irow 21'; Amaechi 54', (yellow card) 62'	Report	Awoniyi 3'; Rudoni 5'; Latibeaudiere (yellow card) 12'; Mason-Clark 67'; Torp 78' (pen.); Eccles (yellow card) 85'	Stadium: Home Park; Attendance: 14,210; Referee: Elliott Swallow

16 September 2026 Third round	Coventry City	1–3	Aston Villa	Coventry
20:00 BST	Mfuni (yellow card) 23'; Torp 27'; Yirenkyi (yellow card) 46'; Onyeka (yellow card) 87'	Report	Abraham 7', 59'; Barkley (yellow card) 26', (goal) 40'; Wan-Bissaka (yellow card) 43'; Buendía (yellow card) 90'	Stadium: Coventry Building Society Arena; Attendance: 24,577; Referee: Robert Jones

== Transfers and contracts ==
=== Transfers in ===
Date	Pos.	Nat.	Player	From	Fee	Ref.
29 June 2026	CM	(Nigeria)	Frank Onyeka	(England) Brentford	£6,800,000	
11 July 2026	RW	(France)	Loum Tchaouna	(England) Burnley	£20,000,000	
16 July 2026	CB	(Switzerland)	Aurèle Amenda	(Germany) Eintracht Frankfurt	£15,400,000 (Note: A potential further £1,700,000 in add-ons.)	
23 July 2026	CF	(England)	Nsemi Bassega	(England) Wycombe Wanderers	Free	
23 July 2026	CF	(England)	Elijah Briscoe	(England) Aston Villa	Free	
23 July 2026	LB	(England)	Billy-Ray Cullinane	(England) Brighton & Hove Albion	Free	
23 July 2026	CAM	(England)	Harrison Gray	(England) Swindon Town	Free	
23 July 2026	CB	(England)	Jimmy Holman	(England) Eastbourne Town	Free	
23 July 2026	CB	(England)	Victor Madu	(England) Norwich City	Free	
23 July 2026	GK	(Wales)	Jack Ruddy	(England) Norwich City	Free	
4 August 2026	GK	(England)	Carl Rushworth	(England) Brighton & Hove Albion	£22,500,000 (Note: A potential further £7,500,000 in add-ons.)	
7 August 2026	CM	(Ghana)	Caleb Yirenkyi	(Denmark) Nordsjælland	£23,100,000 (Note: A potential further £2,900,000 in add-ons.)	
11 August 2026	CM	(Netherlands)	Gustavo Hamer	(England) Sheffield United	£6,000,000 (Note: A potential further £2,000,000 in add-ons.)	
17 August 2026	CF	(Nigeria)	Taiwo Awoniyi	(England) Nottingham Forest	£9,000,000	
19 August 2026	CF	(Guinea)	Sidiki Cherif	(Turkey) Fenerbahçe	£20,500,000	
21 August 2026	GK	(England)	Dan Bentley	(England) Wolverhampton Wanderers	Free	
26 August 2026	CB	(Jamaica)	Ethan Pinnock	(England) Brentford	£5,000,000 (Note: A potential further £1,000,000 in add-ons.)	
4 September 2026	AM	(Ivory Coast)	Yann Gboho	(France) Toulouse	£10,300,000	

Expenditure: ▼£138,600,000

=== Transfers out ===
Date	Pos.	Nat.	Player	To	Fee	Ref.
8 August 2026	RW	(Suriname)	Jahnoah Markelo	(United Arab Emirates) Shabab Al Ahli	£4,400,000	

Income: ▲£4,400,000

=== Loans in ===
Date	Pos.	Nat.	Player	From	Until	Ref.
30 August 2026	CB	(England)	Stephen Mfuni	(England) Manchester City	End of Season	

=== Loans out ===
Date	Pos.	Nat.	Player	To	Until	Ref.
7 July 2026	CM	(England)	Isaac Moore	(England) Walsall	End of season	
21 July 2026	CB	(England)	Callum Perry	(England) Cambridge United	End of season	
22 July 2026	CF	(Belgium)	Norman Bassette	(Belgium) KVC Westerlo	End of season	
7 August 2026	CF	(England)	Joshua Toluwaloju	(England) Brackley Town	4 September 2026	
13 August 2026	LB	(England)	Harvey Broad	(England) AFC Fylde	End of season	
28 August 2026	LB	(Spain)	Miguel Ángel Brau	(Portugal) Académico de Viseu	End of season	
28 August 2026	CM	(Wales)	Kai Andrews	(England) Oxford United	End of season	
29 August 2026	GK	(England)	Oscar Varney	(England) Evesham United	26 September 2026	
29 August 2026	CM	(England)	MacKenzie Stretton	(England) Evesham United	26 September 2026	
12 September 2026	CF	(England)	Joshua Toluwaloju	(England) Bromsgrove Sporting	4 October 2026	
1 September 2026	CB	(Republic of Ireland)	Liam Kitching	(England) Sheffield United	End of season	
1 September 2026	GK	(Sweden)	Oliver Dovin	(England) Leyton Orient	End of season	
1 September 2026	RW	(Australia)	Raphael	(England) Burton Albion	End of season	
12 September 2026	CB	(England)	David Mantle	(England) Maidenhead United	5 December 2026	
20 September 2026	RB	(England)	Tionne Critchlow-Woyo	(England) Spalding United	17 October 2026	
10 October 2026	CF	(England)	Joshua Toluwaloju	(England) Harborough Town	7 November 2026	
23 October 2026	RB	(England)	Tionne Critchlow-Woyo	(England) Stratford Town	23 November 2026	
23 October 2026	CF	(England)	Joshua Stidder	(England) Stratford Town	23 November 2026	
29 October 2026	LB	(England)	Shay Dunn	(England) Nuneaton Town	29 November 2026	
6 November 2026	CB	(England)	Jimmy Holman	(England) Banbury United	6 December 2026	
19 November 2026	CM	(England)	MacKenzie Stretton	(England) Leamington	19 December 2026	

=== Released / out of contract ===
Date	Pos.	Nat.	Player	Subsequent club	Joined date	Ref.
30 June 2026	CAM	(England)	Charlie Finney	(England) Alfreton Town	1 July 2026	
30 June 2026	LW	(England)	Rylie Siddall	(United States) UAB Blazers	1 July 2026	
30 June 2026	GK	(England)	Bradley Collins	(England) Bristol City	11 July 2026	
30 June 2026	LW	(England)	Conrad Ambursley	(United States) Phoenix Rising	16 July 2026	
30 June 2026	CAM	(England)	Kai Yearn	(England) Brackley Town	24 July 2026	
30 June 2026	CM	(England)	Jamie Allen	(England) Rochdale	13 November 2026	
30 June 2026	CM	(England)	Jack James	(England) Coventry United	9 September 2026	
30 June 2026	CB	(England)	Caleb McBride	(England) Boston United	1 August 2026	
30 June 2026	RB	(Grenada)	Greg Sandiford	(Northern Ireland) Larne	30 August 2026	
30 June 2026	LB	(England)	Callum Witts	(England) Hereford	28 August 2026	
30 June 2026	CF	(England)	Success Nidjebu	(England) Bedworth United	28 August 2026	
15 January 2027	CF	(England)	Joshua Toluwaloju			

=== New contracts ===
Date	Pos.	Nat.	Player	Contracted until	Ref.
29 May 2026	CB	(England)	Bobby Thomas	Undisclosed	
29 May 2026	CM	(Denmark)	Victor Torp	Undisclosed	
26 June 2026	CB	(England)	Callum Perry	Undisclosed	
23 July 2026	LB	(England)	Tionne Critchlow-Woyo	Undisclosed (Note: First professional contract.)	
23 July 2026	GK	(Wales)	Eliot Meredith	Undisclosed	
9 November 2026	CB	(England)	Devon West	Undisclosed	

== Squad information ==
No.	Player	Position	Nationality	Place of birth	Date of birth (age) *	Club apps *	Club goals *	Signed from	Date signed	Fee	Contract end
Goalkeepers
13	Ben Wilson	GK	(England)	Stanley	9 August 1992 (aged 33)	123	1	Bradford City	1 July 2019	Free	30 June 2027
19	Carl Rushworth	GK	(England)	Halifax	July 2, 2001 (aged 24)	46	0	Brighton & Hove Albion	4 August 2026	£22,500,000	31 June 2031
25	Dan Bentley	GK	(England)	Basildon	13 July 1993 (aged 32)	0	0	Wolverhampton Wanderers	21 August 2026	Free	30 June 2028
48	Luke Bell	GK	(England)	Kidderminster	1 March 2004 (aged 22)	0	0	Academy	1 July 2022	—N/a	30 June 2027
51	Oscar Varney	GK	(England)		1 October 2006 (aged 19)	0	0	Fulham	4 July 2015	—N/a	30 June 2027
Defenders
2	Ethan Pinnock	DF	(Jamaica) (England)	London	29 May 1993 (aged 33)	0	0	Brentford	26 August 2026	£5,000,000	30 June 2028
3	Jay Dasilva	LB	(Wales) (England)	Luton	22 April 1998 (aged 28)	122	0	Bristol City	1 July 2023	Free	30 June 2028
4	Bobby Thomas	CB	(England)	Chester	30 January 2001 (aged 25)	129	10	Burnley	22 July 2023	Undisclosed	30 June 2029
12	Stephen Mfuni	DF	(England) (Democratic Republic of the Congo)	Wigan	16 January 2008 (aged 18)	0	0	Manchester City	30 August 2026	Loan	31 May 2027
20	Kaine Kesler-Hayden	RB	(England)	Birmingham	22 October 2002 (aged 23)	24	2	Aston Villa	1 July 2025	£3,500,000	30 June 2029
21	Jake Bidwell	LB	(England)	Southport	21 March 1993 (aged 33)	150	3	Swansea City	17 January 2022	Free	30 June 2027
22	Joel Latibeaudiere	CB	(Jamaica) (England)	Doncaster	6 January 2000 (aged 26)	100	4	Swansea City	18 July 2023	Compensation	30 June 2027
24	Aurèle Amenda	CB	(Switzerland) (Cameroon)	Biel/Bienne	31 July 2003 (aged 22)	0	0	Eintracht Frankfurt	16 July 2026	£15,400,000	30 June 2030
26	Luke Woolfenden	CB	(England)	Ipswich	21 October 1998 (aged 27)	18	0	Ipswich Town	1 September 2025	£4,000,000	30 June 2028
27	Milan van Ewijk	RB	(Netherlands) (Suriname)	Amsterdam	8 September 2000 (aged 25)	145	4	Heerenveen	27 July 2023	Undisclosed	30 June 2029
44	Riccardo Di Trolio	CB	(Italy) (England)	Camden	14 August 2005 (aged 20)	0	0	St Albans City	26 January 2023	Free	30 June 2027
Midfielders
5	Jack Rudoni	CM	(England) (United States)	Carshalton	14 June 2001 (aged 25)	83	17	Huddersfield Town	20 June 2024	Undisclosed	30 June 2028
6	Matt Grimes	CM	(England)	Exeter	15 July 1995 (aged 30)	66	4	Swansea City	31 January 2025	Undisclosed	30 June 2028
7	Tatsuhiro Sakamoto	RW	(Japan)	Tokyo	22 October 1996 (aged 29)	117	18	KV Oostende	10 July 2023	Undisclosed	30 June 2027
8	Caleb Yirenkyi	CM	(Ghana)	Bechem	January 15, 2006 (aged 20)	0	0	Nordsjælland	7 August 2026	£23,100,000	30 June 2030
10	Ephron Mason-Clark	LW	(Jamaica) (England)	Lambeth	25 August 1999 (aged 26)	77	16	Peterborough United	1 February 2024	Undisclosed	30 June 2028
16	Frank Onyeka	DM	(Nigeria)	Abuja	16 January 2000 (aged 26)	14	1	Brentford	29 June 2026	£6,800,000	30 June 2030
28	Josh Eccles	CM	(England)	Coventry	6 April 2000 (aged 25)	197	9	Academy	1 July 2018	—N/a	30 June 2028
29	Victor Torp	CM	(Denmark)	Lemvig	30 July 1999 (aged 26)	102	17	Sarpsborg	11 January 2024	Undisclosed	30 June 2028
34	Yann Gboho	LW	(Ivory Coast) (France)	Man	14 January 2001 (aged 25)	0	0	Toulouse	4 September 2026	Undisclosed	30 June 2030
38	Gustavo Hamer	CM	(Netherlands) (Brazil)	Feyenoord	June 24, 1997 (aged 29)	132	19	Sheffield United	11 August 2026	£6,000,000	30 June 2030
50	George Shepherd	AM	(England)	Coventry	December 9, 2008 (aged 17)	0	0	Academy	1 July 2025	—N/a	30 June 2027
Forwards
9	Ellis Simms	CF	(England) (Poland)	Oldham	5 January 2001 (aged 25)	145	40	Everton	7 July 2023	Undisclosed	30 June 2027
11	Haji Wright	FW	(United States) (Liberia)	Los Angeles	27 March 1998 (aged 28)	124	49	Antalyaspor	4 August 2023	£7,700,000	30 June 2027
14	Taiwo Awoniyi	FW	(Nigeria)	Ilorin	12 August 1997 (aged 28)	0	0	Nottingham Forest	17 August 2026	£9,000,000	30 June 2031
17**	Loum Tchaouna	RW	(France) (Chad)	N'Djamena	8 September 2003 (aged 22)	0	0	Burnley	11 July 2026	£20,000,000	30 June 2031
23	Brandon Thomas-Asante	FW	(Ghana) (England)	Milton Keynes	29 December 1998 (aged 27)	77	19	West Bromwich Albion	1 August 2024	Undisclosed	30 June 2028
49	Sidiki Cherif	FW	(Guinea) (France)	Dubréka	6 February 2007 (aged 19)	0	0	Fenerbahçe	19 August 2026	£20,500,000	30 June 2032
59	Aidan Dausch	FW	(England) (United States)	London	1 June 2006 (aged 20)	2	0	Academy	1 July 2023	—N/a	30 June 2027
Out on loan
1	Oliver Dovin	GK	(Sweden) (England)	London	8 July 2002 (aged 23)	30	0	Hammarby IF	19 July 2024	Undisclosed	30 June 2028
15	Liam Kitching	CB	(Republic of Ireland) (England)	Harrogate	25 October 1999 (aged 26)	106	4	Barnsley	1 September 2023	Undisclosed	30 June 2028
17	Raphael	RW	(Australia) (Brazil)	Maastricht	11 September 2003 (aged 22)	9	0	Macarthur	14 June 2024	Undisclosed	30 June 2028
33	Miguel Ángel Brau	LB	(Spain)	Cartagena	27 December 2001 (aged 24)	11	0	Granada	1 July 2025	Free	30 June 2029
36	Isaac Moore	CM	(England)		April 15, 2006 (aged 20)	0	0	Academy	1 July 2023	—N/a	30 June 2028
37	Norman Bassette	FW	(Belgium)	Arlon	9 November 2004 (aged 21)	29	2	Caen	21 August 2024	Undisclosed	30 June 2028
41	Callum Perry	CB	(England)		October 5, 2005 (aged 20)	0	0	Academy	1 July 2023	—N/a	31 June 2030
51	Harvey Broad	LB	(England)	Chatham	1 September 2005 (aged 20)	0	0	Chatham Town	11 July 2024	Undisclosed	30 June 2027
54	Kai Andrews	CM	(Wales) (England)	Birmingham	6 August 2006 (aged 19)	12	0	Academy	1 July 2022	—N/a	30 June 2028
Left before the end of the season

Last updated: 22 August 2026.
Source: Coventry City

* Player age and appearances/goals for the club as of beginning of 2026–27 season.
** Loum Tchaouna originally had squad number 18 but later changed this to 17.

== Statistics ==
=== Appearances ===
As of match played 21 November 2026

Players with no appearances are not included on the list

Number	Nationality	Player	Position	Premier League	FA Cup	EFL Cup	Total
2	(Jamaica)	Ethan Pinnock	DF	9+1	0	0+1	11
3	(Wales)	Jay Dasilva	DF	10	0	0	10
4	(England)	Bobby Thomas	DF	9	0	2	11
5	(England)	Jack Rudoni	MF	10+1	0	1	12
6	(England)	Matt Grimes	MF	9+2	0	0	11
7	(Japan)	Tatsuhiro Sakamoto	MF	5+2	0	2	9
8	(Ghana)	Caleb Yirenkyi	MF	8+2	0	2	12
9	(England)	Ellis Simms	FW	1+3	0	0+1	5
10	(Jamaica)	Ephron Mason-Clark	MF	5+2	0	0+1	8
12	(England)	Stephen Mfuni	DF	4+2	0	1	7
14	(Nigeria)	Taiwo Awoniyi	FW	6+3	0	1	10
15	(Republic of Ireland)	Liam Kitching	DF	0	0	1	1
16	(Nigeria)	Frank Onyeka	MF	4+4	0	0+1	9
17	(France)	Loum Tchaouna	FW	2+3	0	0+1	6
19	(England)	Carl Rushworth	GK	11	0	0	11
20	(England)	Kaine Kesler-Hayden	DF	0+1	0	0	1
21	(England)	Jake Bidwell	DF	0	0	1+1	2
22	(Jamaica)	Joel Latibeaudiere	DF	0+1	0	2	3
23	(Ghana)	Brandon Thomas-Asante	FW	5+6	0	0+1	12
24	(Switzerland)	Aurèle Amenda	DF	4	0	1+1	6
25	(England)	Dan Bentley	GK	0	0	2	2
27	(Netherlands)	Milan van Ewijk	DF	10	0	0	10
28	(England)	Josh Eccles	MF	0	0	0+1	1
29	(Denmark)	Victor Torp	MF	3+4	0	2	9
34	(Ivory Coast)	Yann Gboho	MF	3	0	1	4
38	(Netherlands)	Gustavo Hamer	MF	0+7	0	2	9
49	(Guinea)	Sidiki Cherif	FW	3+4	0	1+1	9

=== Goalscorers ===
As of match played 21 November 2026

Number	Nationality	Player	Position	Premier League	FA Cup	EFL Cup	Total
5	(England)	Jack Rudoni	MF	3	0	1	4
14	(Nigeria)	Taiwo Awoniyi	FW	2	0	1	3
29	(Denmark)	Victor Torp	MF	0	0	2	2
7	(Japan)	Tatsuhiro Sakamoto	MF	2	0	0	2
3	(Wales)	Jay Dasilva	DF	1	0	0	1
9	(England)	Ellis Simms	FW	1	0	0	1
10	(Jamaica)	Ephron Mason-Clark	MF	0	0	1	1
12	(England)	Stephen Mfuni	DF	1	0	0	1
34	(Ivory Coast)	Yann Gboho	MF	1	0	0	1
49	(Guinea)	Sidiki Cherif	FW	1	0	0	1
Own goals				1	0	0	1
Totals				13	0	5	18

=== Yellow cards ===
As of match played 21 November 2026

Number	Nationality	Player	Position	Premier League	FA Cup	EFL Cup	Total
8	(Ghana)	Caleb Yirenkyi	MF	3	0	1	4
27	(Netherlands)	Milan van Ewijk	DF	2	0	0	2
2	(Jamaica)	Ethan Pinnock	DF	1	0	0	1
3	(Wales)	Jay Dasilva	DF	1	0	0	1
5	(England)	Jack Rudoni	MF	1	0	0	1
6	(England)	Matt Grimes	MF	1	0	0	1
7	(Japan)	Tatsuhiro Sakamoto	MF	1	0	0	1
12	(England)	Stephen Mfuni	DF	0	0	1	1
16	(Nigeria)	Frank Onyeka	MF	0	0	1	1
22	(Jamaica)	Joel Latibeaudiere	DF	0	0	1	1
24	(Switzerland)	Aurèle Amenda	DF	1	0	0	1
28	(England)	Josh Eccles	MF	0	0	1	1
29	(Denmark)	Victor Torp	MF	1	0	0	1
Totals				12	0	5	17

=== Red cards ===
As of match played 13 September 2026

Number	Nationality	Player	Position	Premier League	FA Cup	EFL Cup	Total
14	(Nigeria)	Taiwo Awoniyi	FW	1	0	0	1
Totals				1	0	0	1

=== Captains ===
As of match played 21 November 2026

Number	Nationality	Player	Position	Premier League	FA Cup	EFL Cup	Total
6	(England)	Matt Grimes	MF	9	0	0	9
2	(Jamaica)	Ethan Pinnock	DF	2	0	0	2
4	(England)	Bobby Thomas	DF	0	0	1	1
15	(Republic of Ireland)	Liam Kitching	DF	0	0	1	1
Totals				11	0	2	13

=== Penalties awarded ===
Number	Nationality	Player	Position	Date	Opponents	Ground	Success
29	(Denmark)	Victor Torp	MF	25 August 2026	Plymouth Argyle	Home Park	✓
5	(England)	Jack Rudoni	MF	12 October 2026	Newcastle United	Coventry Building Society Arena	✓

=== Suspensions served ===
Number	Nationality	Player	Position	Date suspended	Reason	Matches missed
14	(Nigeria)	Taiwo Awoniyi	FW	16 September 2026	1 red card vs. Brighton & Hove Albion	Aston Villa (H); Nottingham Forest (A); Newcastle United (H)

== Awards ==
=== Player awards ===
==== Premier League Player of the Month ====
Month	Pos.	Player	G	A	CS	S	Result	Ref.
October	MF	(England) Jack Rudoni	3	0	—	—	Nominated	
