= Haji Wright =

American soccer player (born 1998)

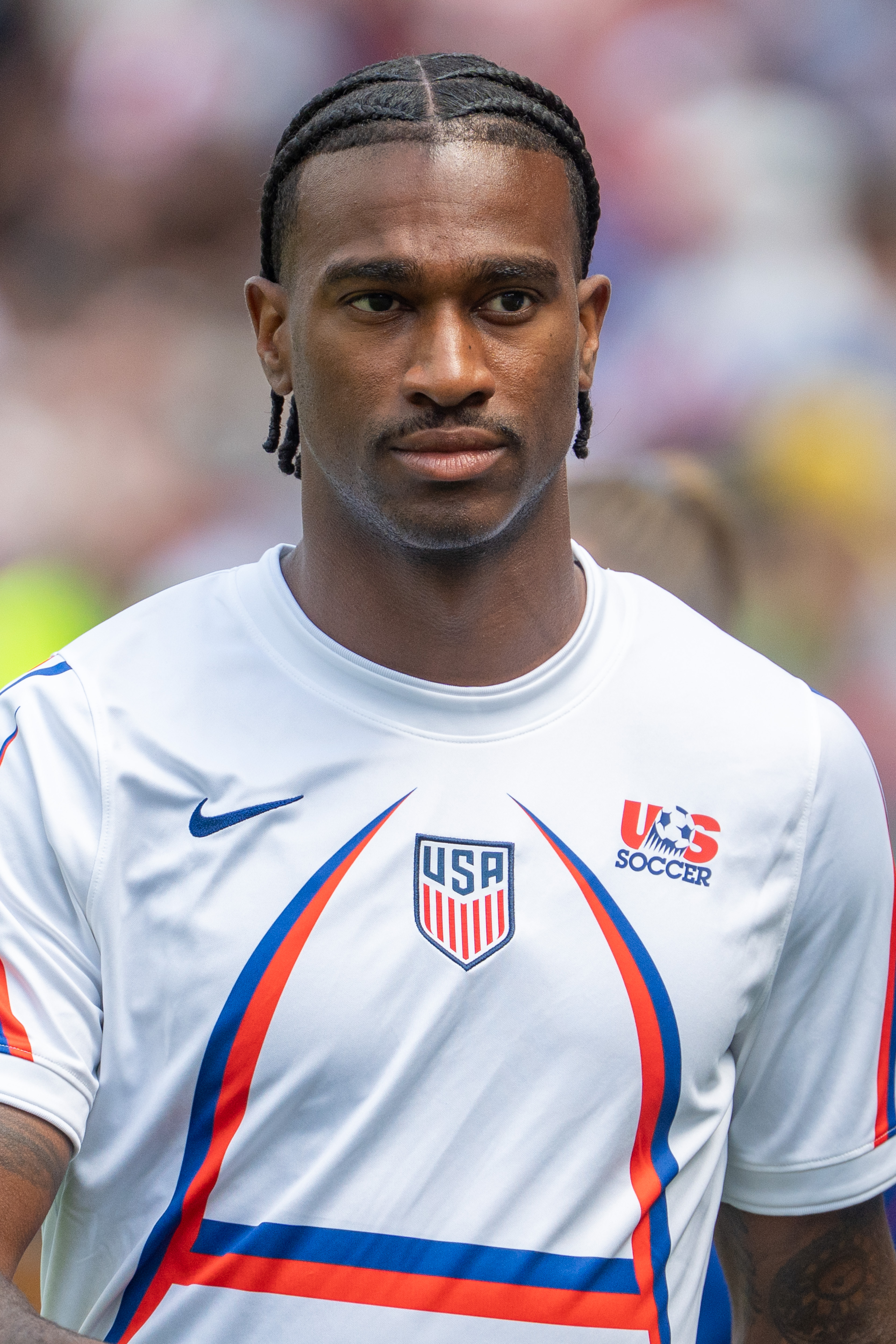
- Wright with the United States in 2026

Personal information
- Full name: Haji Amir Wright
- Date of birth: March 27, 1998 (age 28)
- Place of birth: Los Angeles, California, U.S.
- Height: 6 ft 4 in (1.93 m)
- Positions: Forward; winger

Team information
- Current team: Coventry City
- Number: 11

Youth career
- 2012–2015: LA Galaxy
- 2016–2017: Schalke 04

Senior career*
Years	Team	Apps	(Gls)
2015	New York Cosmos	3	(0)
2017–2019	Schalke 04 II	22	(14)
2016–2019	Schalke 04	7	(1)
2017–2018	→ SV Sandhausen (loan)	15	(1)
2019–2020	VVV-Venlo	22	(0)
2020–2022	Sønderjyske	29	(11)
2021–2022	→ Antalyaspor (loan)	32	(14)
2022–2023	Antalyaspor	28	(15)
2023–	Coventry City	111	(44)

International career^{‡}
2013	United States U15	10	(2)
2013–2015	United States U17	34	(27)
2014–2015	United States U18	5	(2)
2016	United States U19	2	(0)
2019	United States U23	2	(0)
2022–	United States	22	(7)
Medal record
Men's soccer
Representing United States
CONCACAF Gold Cup
Runner-up	2025 Canada–United States
CONCACAF Nations League
Winner	2024 United States
- * Club domestic league appearances and goals as of 04:11, May 2, 2026 (UTC) ‡ National team caps and goals as of July 6, 2026

Haji Amir Wright (born March 27, 1998) is an American professional soccer player who plays as a forward or winger for Premier League club Coventry City and the United States national team.

After making his professional debut with the New York Cosmos in 2015, Wright has spent most of his career in Europe, with Schalke 04 in the German Bundesliga, VVV-Venlo in the Dutch Eredivisie, SønderjyskE in the Danish Superliga and Antalyaspor in the Turkish Süper Lig.

Wright made his senior debut for the United States national team in 2022, and played at the FIFA World Cup in 2022 and 2026.

== Youth soccer ==
Known for his finishing, ability to win headers, and quickness, Wright was dubbed by many media outlets as one of the top prospects in the United States youth system. His success with the under-17 national team prompted him to train with Schalke 04's academy.

== Club career ==
=== New York Cosmos ===
In March 2015, Wright officially signed with NASL club New York Cosmos for an undisclosed fee and contract length. He made his professional debut on May 27 in the third round of the U.S. Open Cup, as a 79th-minute substitute for Sebastián Guenzatti in a 3–0 home win over the Jersey Express, and then played three league games for a total of 80 minutes, starting with the game versus Indy Eleven on July 26. Wright's contract expired following the season, and he did not re-sign.

=== Schalke 04 ===
In April 2016, Wright signed with Schalke 04. In his debut with the Schalke under-19 team on April 16, Wright scored a brace against Borussia Mönchengladbach U19.

Wright was promoted to the Schalke first team in May 2017. He was named on the bench against FC Ingolstadt 04 on May 20, 2017. In July 2018, Wright underwent a trial period with 2. Bundesliga club Union Berlin. On November 24, 2018, Wright made his debut for Schalke first team when he replaced Steven Skrzybski in the 88th minute of the 5–2 win against 1. FC Nürnberg. He played seven games for the team from Gelsenkirchen, all in the league, and scored a consolation goal in a 2–1 home loss to Bayer Leverkusen on December 19; the goal was assisted by compatriot Weston McKennie.

=== VVV-Venlo ===
In July 2019, Wright joined VVV-Venlo on a free transfer. He played 22 Eredivisie games without scoring, but scored in the first round of the KNVB Cup on October 30; coming on in the last minute, he tied the game at 2–2 at fourth-tier RKSV Groene Ster, but missed the decisive attempt in a penalty shootout defeat.

=== SønderjyskE ===
In August 2020, Wright joined SønderjyskE on a free transfer. He got off to a strong start in the league, with six goals in eight appearances by early November, and his performances led to him being named as the Danish Superliga Player of the Month for October 2020.

In July 2021, Wright wanted to move on from SønderjyskE and failed to report back for pre-season training. On July 21, Turkish club Antalyaspor confirmed that they had signed Wright on loan from SønderjyskE with an option to buy. However, later on the same day, SønderjyskE went out and denied that the deal had gone through because they had not yet received any payment. However, on July 28, SønderjyskE confirmed that he had been loaned out to Antalyaspor for the 2021–22 season and also signed a new deal with Sønderjyske until June 2024.

=== Antalyaspor ===
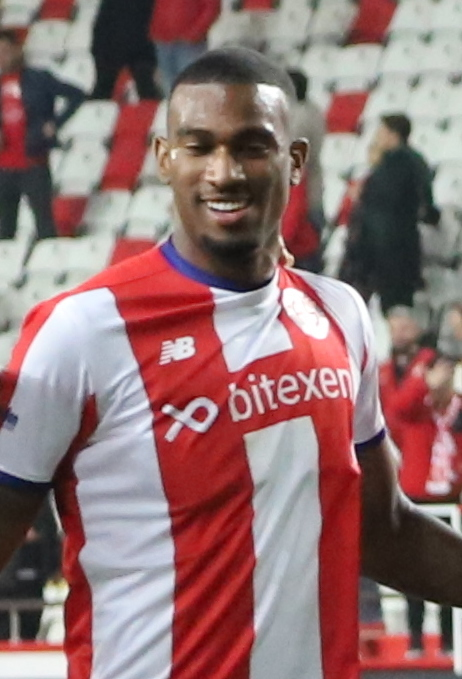
Wright playing for Antalyaspor in 2021

Wright opened his account for Antalyaspor in his third game on August 28, 2021, in which he scored a hat-trick in a 3–2 home win over Çaykur Rizespor, concluding with a penalty kick in the tenth minute of added time. He scored 14 goals in 31 games in the 2021–22 Süper Lig, including eight over seven consecutive games, and nine in the last ten games.

On July 19, 2022, Wright signed for Antalyaspor permanently on a three-year deal. He scored 16 goals in all competitions for the club as they finished 13th in the Süper Lig.

=== Coventry City ===
Wright joined EFL Championship club Coventry City on August 4, 2023, on a four-year contract for a club-record transfer fee of €9 million. On August 12, 2023, he scored his first goal for the club on his home debut in a 3–0 win against Middlesbrough. On March 16, 2024, Wright converted a 100th minute stoppage time goal for Coventry in the quarter-finals of the 2023–24 FA Cup against Wolverhampton Wanderers, helping the club progress beyond the round for the first time since Coventry's 1986–87 FA Cup victory. In the semi-final against Manchester United at Wembley Wright scored a 95th minute equalizing penalty to complete a comeback from 3–0 down and take the game to extra time. He then provided an assist for a 121st minute goal by Victor Torp, but this was disallowed by VAR for offside and Coventry were eliminated on penalties. He finished the 2023–24 season with 19 goals in all competitions, including 16 in the Championship.

Wright scored his first goals of the 2024–25 season against Oxford United in a 3–2 win on August 16, including an injury time winner after an error by Will Vaulks. During a 2–2 draw against Sunderland on November 9, Wright picked up an ankle ligament injury, which kept him out of action for four months. On March 15, Wright scored a hat-trick against Sunderland in a 3–0 victory for Coventry, these were his first goals since returning from injury, and it was also his first hat-trick for the club. He scored a second hat-trick on February 16, 2026, in a crucial 3–1 home win over Middlesbrough.

== International career ==
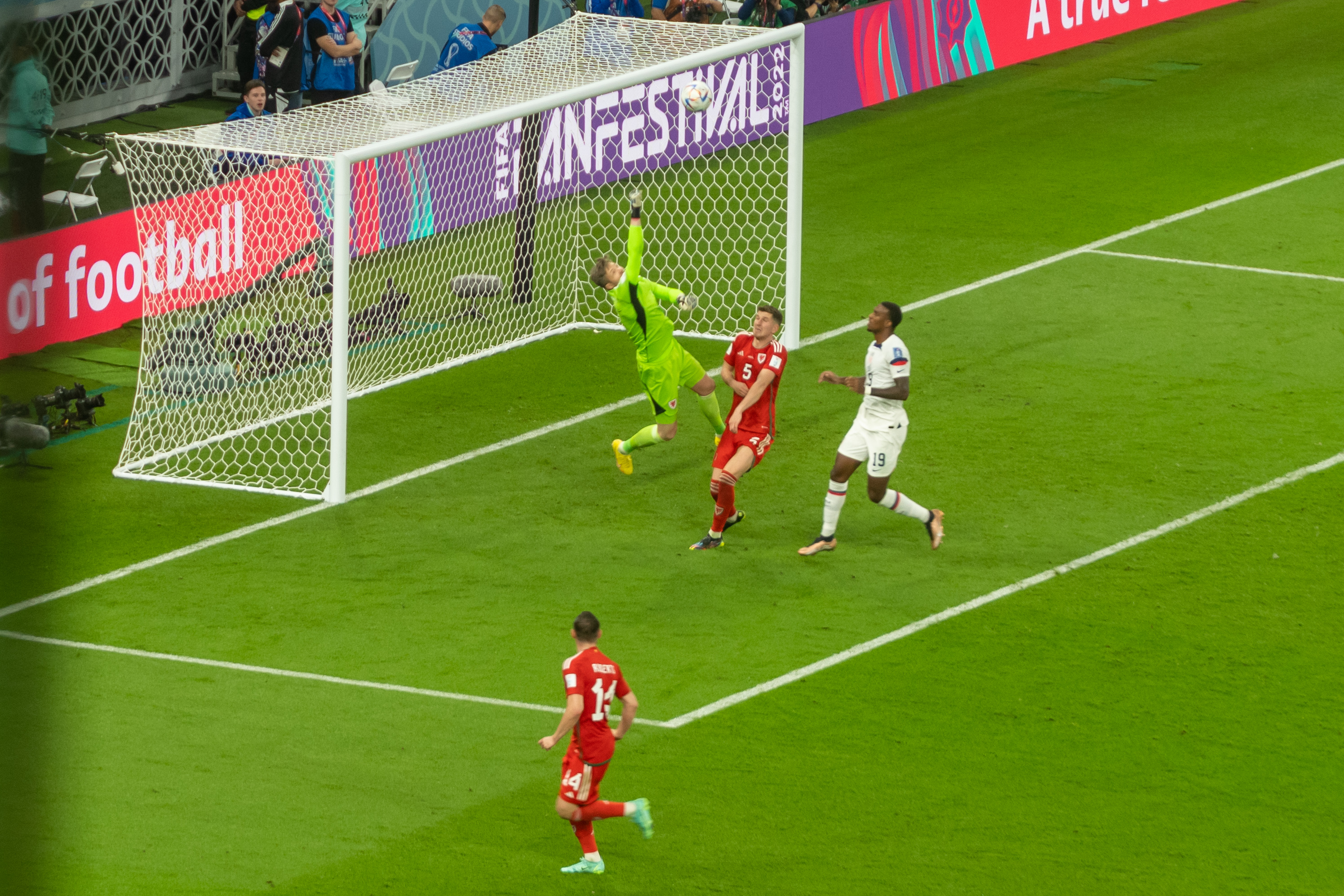
Wright (in white) playing against Wales at the 2022 FIFA World Cup

Wright is of Liberian and Ghanaian descent. He has represented the United States at all levels. In May 2022, Wright was called into the United States senior camp by Gregg Berhalter for a CONCACAF Nations League window.

Wright scored his first international goal on his senior debut for the United States on June 1, 2022, in a 3–0 friendly victory against Morocco. In November 2022, Wright was named to the squad for the 2022 FIFA World Cup. He scored for the United States in their 3–1 loss to the Netherlands in the round of 16.

On March 17, 2024, Wright was called up to the national team as an injury replacement for Josh Sargent to compete in the 2024 CONCACAF Nations League Finals. On March 21, he scored an extra-time brace against Jamaica in a 3–1 win.

On May 26, 2026, Wright was selected in the 26-man squad for the 2026 FIFA World Cup.

== Personal life ==
Haji's brother Hanif played on the under-19 team of Bonner SC in 2017. Haji's cousins are also active in athletics: Joseph Putu played cornerback for the Florida Gators, his second cousin, Isaac Nana Addai, played for the Liberia national under-23 team as well as Boston City FC, and his third cousin, Joseph Addai, won Super Bowl XLI in 2007 with the Indianapolis Colts.

== Career statistics ==
=== Club ===
As of match played May 2, 2026

Appearances and goals by club, season and competition
Club	Season	League			National cup (Note: Includes U.S. Open Cup, KNVB Cup, Danish Cup, Turkish Cup, FA Cup)		League cup (Note: Includes EFL Cup)		Continental		Other		Total	
Club	Season	Division	Apps	Goals	Apps	Goals	Apps	Goals	Apps	Goals	Apps	Goals	Apps	Goals
New York Cosmos	2015	NASL	3	0	1	0	—		—		—		4	0
Schalke 04	2016–17	Bundesliga	0	0	—		—		—		—		0	0
Schalke 04	2018–19	Bundesliga	7	1	—		—		—		—		7	1
Schalke 04	Total		7	1	0	0	0	0	0	0	0	0	7	1
SV Sandhausen (loan)	2017–18	2. Bundesliga	15	1	—		—		—		—		15	1
Schalke 04 II	2018–19	Oberliga Westfalen	22	14	—		—		—		—		22	14
VVV-Venlo	2019–20	Eredivisie	22	0	1	1	—		—		—		23	1
SønderjyskE	2020–21	Danish Superliga	29	11	7	2	—		1 (Note: Appearance in UEFA Europa League)	0	—		37	13
Antalyaspor (loan)	2021–22	Süper Lig	32	14	3	1	—		—		—		35	15
Antalyaspor	2022–23	Süper Lig	28	15	1	1	—		—		—		29	16
Coventry City	2023–24	Championship	44	16	5	3	1	0	—		—		50	19
Coventry City	2024–25	Championship	27	12	—		2	0	—		2 (Note: Appearances in Championship play-offs)	0	31	12
Coventry City	2025–26	Championship	40	17	1	0	2	1	—		—		43	18
Coventry City	2026–27	Premier League	0	0	0	0	0	0	—		—		0	0
Coventry City	Total		111	45	6	3	5	1	0	0	2	0	124	49
Career total			269	101	19	8	5	1	1	0	2	0	296	110

=== International ===
As of match played July 6, 2026

Appearances and goals by national team and year
National team	Year	Apps	Goals
United States	2022	7	2
United States	2023	0	0
United States	2024	8	2
United States	2025	5	3
United States	2026	2	0
Total		22	7

Scores and results list United States' goal tally first, score column indicates score after each Wright goal.

List of international goals scored by Haji Wright
No.	Date	Venue	Cap	Opponent	Score	Result	Competition
1	June 1, 2022	TQL Stadium, Cincinnati, United States	1	Morocco	3–0	3–0	Friendly
2	December 3, 2022	Khalifa International Stadium, Al Rayyan, Qatar	7	Netherlands	1–2	1–3	2022 FIFA World Cup
3	March 21, 2024	AT&T Stadium, Arlington, United States	8	Jamaica	2–1	3–1 (a.e.t.)	2024 CONCACAF Nations League Finals
4	March 21, 2024	AT&T Stadium, Arlington, United States	8	Jamaica	3–1	3–1 (a.e.t.)	2024 CONCACAF Nations League Finals
5	June 15, 2025	PayPal Park, San Jose, United States	17	Trinidad and Tobago	5–0	5–0	2025 CONCACAF Gold Cup
6	October 14, 2025	Dick's Sporting Goods Park, Commerce City, United States	19	Australia	1–1	2–1	Friendly
7	October 14, 2025	Dick's Sporting Goods Park, Commerce City, United States	19	Australia	2–1	2–1	Friendly

== Honors ==
New York Cosmos

- North American Soccer League: 2015

Coventry City

- EFL Championship: 2025–26

United States

- CONCACAF Nations League: 2023–24

Individual

- CONCACAF Nations League Finals Best XI: 2024
- Superliga Player of the Month: October 2020
- EFL Championship Team of the Year: 2025–26
- PFA Team of the Year: 2025–26 Championship
