= Carl Rushworth =

English footballer (born 2001)

Personal information
- Full name: Carl Andrew Rushworth
- Date of birth: 2 July 2001 (age 25)
- Place of birth: Halifax, West Yorkshire, England
- Height: 6 ft 2 in (1.88 m)
- Position: Goalkeeper

Team information
- Current team: Coventry City
- Number: 19

Youth career
- –2017: Huddersfield Town
- 2017–2019: FC Halifax Town
- 2019: Brighton & Hove Albion

Senior career*
Years	Team	Apps	(Gls)
2019–2026	Brighton & Hove Albion	0	(0)
2019–2020	→ Worthing (loan)	23	(0)
2021–2022	→ Walsall (loan)	43	(0)
2022–2023	→ Lincoln City (loan)	42	(0)
2023–2024	→ Swansea City (loan)	46	(0)
2024–2025	→ Hull City (loan)	2	(0)
2025–2026	→ Coventry City (loan)	46	(0)
2026–	Coventry City	11	(0)

International career
2023	England U21	1	(0)
Medal record
Representing England
UEFA European Under-21 Championship
Winner	2023
- * Club domestic league appearances and goals as of 08:36, 22 November 2026 (UTC)

Carl Andrew Rushworth (born 2 July 2001) is an English professional footballer who plays as a goalkeeper for Premier League club Coventry City.

Rushworth spent his early career with the youth teams of Huddersfield Town and FC Halifax Town before joining Brighton & Hove Albion in 2019, where he had spent loan spells at Worthing, Walsall, Lincoln City, Swansea City, Hull City and Coventry City. He joined Coventry permanently in August 2026.

== Club career ==
Rushworth started his career with Huddersfield Town before being released at 16; he subsequently joined the academy of FC Halifax Town before being signed by Brighton & Hove Albion in 2019. He signed for Worthing on a season-long loan in August 2019. He made 30 appearances in all competitions for the seventh-tier side.

He signed a new three-year contract with Brighton in July 2020.

Rushworth moved on a season-long loan to League Two side Walsall in July 2021. He made his debut for the club on 7 August 2021 in the 1–0 away loss at Tranmere in the opening game of the 2021–22 season, which was also his Football League debut. On 5 January 2022, whilst on loan at Walsall, Rushworth signed a new contract with Brighton, committing to the club until 2025.

On 8 July 2022, Rushworth joined League One side Lincoln City on a season-long loan deal. He made his Lincoln debut on the opening day of the season against Exeter City.

He signed on loan for Championship outfit Swansea City on 31 July 2023 for the 2023–24 season. He made his debut five days later, denying a late Ivan Šunjić winner with a superb save in the 1–1 home draw against Birmingham City. In Rushworth's second Championship game for the "Swans", he scored an own goal after the ball rebounded off the crossbar into him, putting West Bromwich Albion back ahead in the eventual 3–2 away loss. At the end of the 2023–24 season, he was named both Supporters' Player of the Year and Players' Player of the Year.

On 30 August 2024, Rushworth moved to the Championship again, joining Hull City on a season-long loan. He made his debut for The Tigers on 12 January 2025 in the FA Cup, in a 1–1 draw with Doncaster Rovers, which Hull lost on penalties. Brighton recalled him in January 2025.

On 24 July 2025, he joined Coventry City on a season-long loan. He made his debut for the club on 9 August 2025, in a 0–0 draw with Hull City. At the end of the 2025–26 season, Rushworth was awarded Fans' Player of the Season, Player's Player of the Season, and Young Player of the Season by the club.

After Brighton rejected an initial transfer bid in June 2026, Rushworth joined Coventry permanently on 4 August 2026 for a club-record fee of roughly £22.5 million.

== International career ==
In November 2019, Rushworth earned his first international call-up when he was selected in Paul Simpson's squad for England U19's three UEFA European U19 Championship qualifiers against Luxembourg, Macedonia and Bosnia and Herzegovina, although he did not play.

He was part of the England U20 squads in October and November 2020, but did not play.

On 5 October 2021, Rushworth received his first call-up to the England U21s as a replacement for Josh Griffiths. He was recalled in March 2022 for 2023 European Under-21 Championship qualifying matches against Andorra and Albania.

On 10 June 2023, Rushworth made his England U21 debut during a 2–0 defeat to Japan at St. George's Park. On 14 June, he was included in the England squad for the 2023 UEFA European Under-21 Championship; a tournament the Young Lions ultimately went on to win.

== Career statistics ==
As of match played 21 November 2026

Appearances and goals by club, season and competition
Club	Season	League			FA Cup		EFL Cup		Other		Total	
Club	Season	Division	Apps	Goals	Apps	Goals	Apps	Goals	Apps	Goals	Apps	Goals
Brighton & Hove Albion U21	2020–21	—			—		—		3 (Note: Appearance(s) in the EFL Trophy.)	0	3	0
Brighton & Hove Albion	2019–20	Premier League	0	0	0	0	0	0	—		0	0
Brighton & Hove Albion	2020–21	Premier League	0	0	0	0	0	0	—		0	0
Brighton & Hove Albion	2021–22	Premier League	0	0	0	0	0	0	—		0	0
Brighton & Hove Albion	2022–23	Premier League	0	0	0	0	0	0	—		0	0
Brighton & Hove Albion	2023–24	Premier League	0	0	0	0	0	0	—		0	0
Brighton & Hove Albion	2024–25	Premier League	0	0	0	0	0	0	—		0	0
Brighton & Hove Albion	2025–26	Premier League	0	0	0	0	0	0	—		0	0
Brighton & Hove Albion	Total		0	0	0	0	0	0	0	0	0	0
Worthing (loan)	2019–20	Isthmian League; Premier Division	23	0	0	0	—		7 (Note: Two appearances in FA Trophy, three appearances in Alan Turvey Trophy, and two appearances in Sussex Senior Challenge Cup)	0	30	0
Walsall (loan)	2021–22	League Two	43	0	2	0	1	0	0	0	46	0
Lincoln City (loan)	2022–23	League One	42	0	0	0	3	0	1	0	46	0
Swansea City (loan)	2023–24	Championship	46	0	0	0	2	0	—		48	0
Hull City (loan)	2024–25	Championship	2	0	1	0	0	0	—		3	0
Coventry City (loan)	2025–26	Championship	46	0	0	0	0	0	—		46	0
Coventry City	2026–27	Premier League	11	0	0	0	0	0	—		11	0
Career total			213	0	3	0	6	0	11	0	233	0

== Honours ==
Coventry City

- EFL Championship: 2025–26

England U21

- UEFA European Under-21 Championship: 2023

Individual

- EFL Championship Team of the Year: 2025–26
- EFL Championship Golden Glove: 2025–26
- PFA Team of the Year: 2025–26 Championship
