= Jay Dasilva =

Wales international footballer (born 1998)

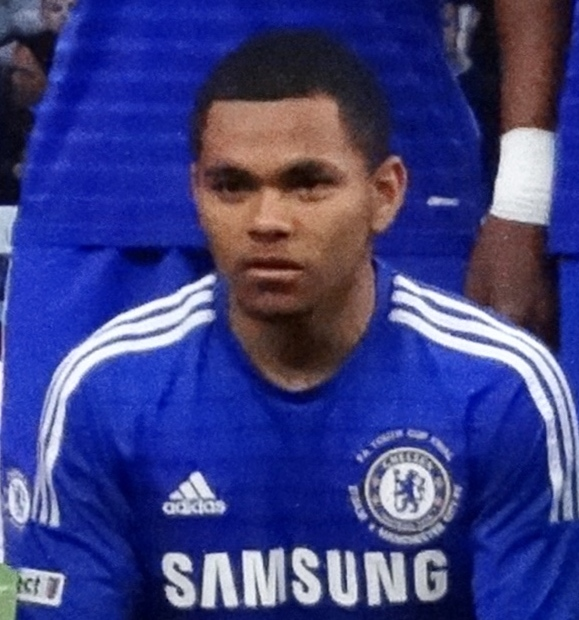
- Dasilva playing for Chelsea U18 in 2015

Personal information
- Full name: Jay Rhys Dasilva
- Date of birth: 22 April 1998 (age 28)
- Place of birth: Luton, Bedfordshire, England
- Height: 5 ft 7 in (1.70 m)
- Position: Defender

Team information
- Current team: Coventry City
- Number: 3

Youth career
- 2007–2012: Luton Town
- 2012–2016: Chelsea

Senior career*
| Years | Team | Apps | (Gls) |
| 2016–2019 | Chelsea | 0 | (0) |
| 2017 | → Charlton Athletic (loan) | 10 | (0) |
| 2017–2018 | → Charlton Athletic (loan) | 38 | (0) |
| 2018–2019 | → Bristol City (loan) | 28 | (0) |
| 2019–2023 | Bristol City | 105 | (2) |
| 2023– | Coventry City | 117 | (1) |

International career^{‡}
| 2012–2013 | England U16 | 4 | (0) |
| 2013–2015 | England U17 | 21 | (1) |
| 2015–2016 | England U18 | 4 | (0) |
| 2016–2017 | England U19 | 15 | (0) |
| 2017–2018 | England U20 | 6 | (0) |
| 2018–2019 | England U21 | 13 | (0) |
| 2024– | Wales | 15 | (0) |
- * Club domestic league appearances and goals as of 13 October 2026 ‡ National team caps and goals as of 22:09, 17 November 2026 (UTC)

Jay Rhys Dasilva (born 22 April 1998) is a professional footballer who plays as a defender for Premier League club Coventry City and the Wales national team. He was also capped 63 times as an England youth international at all levels (from U16 to U21).

== Club career ==
=== Chelsea ===
Dasilva joined Chelsea from Luton Town in 2012, aged just thirteen, and was quickly integrated into the club's youth setup, making his under-16 debut as an under-15 the following year. The following season, he made 23 appearances for the youth team, including scoring in the 2013–14 FA Youth Cup final first leg against Fulham.

During his second full season with the under-18s, Dasilva won the 2014–15 FA Youth Cup, as well as the 2014–15 UEFA Youth League, playing all but one game in the UEFA Youth League. He signed his first professional contract in July 2015, having forced himself into Chelsea's under-21 side, where he established himself as a key player over the next year. He became one of the only players in history to win three FA Youth Cups, alongside teammate Jake Clarke-Salter and five of the famed Busby Babes, when he was part of the Chelsea side that lifted the 2015–16 FA Youth Cup. He was also a member of the Chelsea side that claimed the 2015–16 UEFA Youth League, however he was an unused substitute in the final victory against PSG.

==== Charlton Athletic (loan) ====
On 30 December 2016, Dasilva was loaned to League One side Charlton Athletic. He made his debut for The Addicks on 14 January 2017, coming on as a substitute for Lewis Page against Millwall. He was brought on in the 28th minute, but was later substituted in the 80th minute of the game. On 4 April 2017, Dasilva was given his first start for Charlton by manager Karl Robinson, in their 2–0 home defeat against Milton Keynes Dons, featuring for the entire 90 minutes.

On 21 July 2017, Dasilva signed a new contract with Chelsea until 2021 and rejoined Charlton Athletic for a second loan spell.

On 7 May 2018, Dasilva was voted the 2017–18 Fans Player of the Year.

=== Bristol City ===
On 9 August 2018, Dasilva joined Bristol City on a season long loan from Chelsea. He signed for Bristol City permanently on 26 June 2019 on a four-year contract for an undisclosed fee. He scored his first goal for Bristol City, and his first professional goal, in a 2–1 win against Huddersfield Town on 3 November 2020.

In May 2023, Dasilva was released from Bristol City.

=== Coventry City ===
On 30 May 2023, Coventry announced the signing of Dasilva on a free transfer and a four-year deal after he was released by Bristol City. On 19 September 2026, he scored his first goal and the first goal for Coventry after their return to the Premier League.

== International career ==
Dasilva has represented England at under-16, under-17, under-18, under-19, under-20 and under-21 youth levels.

He was called up to the England under-16 team shortly after joining Chelsea's youth ranks for a Victory Shield game against Scotland. He made 4 appearances in total at this age level.

He was later called up to the England under-17 team for 2015 UEFA European Under-17 Championship qualification in 2014. He scored his first and only goal at this age group, described as a 'brilliant solo effort', in a 3–1 victory over France. He maintained his place in the squad for the full tournament, and played in every game as England were knocked out by eventual semi-finalists Russia. His last match for the under-17s came in a 0–0 draw with South Korea at the 2015 FIFA U-17 World Cup.

In March 2017, Dasilva was called up to the England under-19 team for 2017 UEFA European Under-19 Championship qualification. In July 2017, Dasilva captained the England under-19 team to victory at the 2017 UEFA European Under-19 Championship.

On 27 May 2019, Dasilva was included in England's 23-man squad for the 2019 UEFA European Under-21 Championship.

On 12 November 2023, Dasilva was called up to the Wales senior squad for the first time. He qualifies to play for Wales as his grandmother was born in Pontypridd. Dasilva made his international debut on 6 June 2024 in a friendly against Gibraltar at the Estádio Algarve in Portugal. He played the full game as it ended in a goalless draw.

== Personal life ==
Jay Dasilva is the brother of twins who are also footballers; Cole Dasilva and Rio Dasilva. He has English, Welsh, Jamaican and Vincentian heritage.

== Career statistics ==
=== Club ===
As of match played on 6 November 2026

Appearances and goals by club, season and competition
| Club | Season | League | | | FA Cup | | EFL Cup | | Other | | Total | |
| Club | Season | Division | Apps | Goals | Apps | Goals | Apps | Goals | Apps | Goals | Apps | Goals |
|---|---|---|---|---|---|---|---|---|---|---|---|---|
| Chelsea | 2016–17 | Premier League | 0 | 0 | 0 | 0 | 0 | 0 | — | | 0 | 0 |
| Chelsea | 2018–19 | Premier League | — | | — | | — | | 0 | 0 | 0 | 0 |
| Chelsea | Total | | 0 | 0 | 0 | 0 | 0 | 0 | 0 | 0 | 0 | 0 |
| Chelsea U23 | 2016–17 | — | | | — | | — | | 2 (Note: Appearances in EFL Trophy) | 0 | 2 | 0 |
| Charlton Athletic (loan) | 2016–17 | League One | 10 | 0 | — | | — | | — | | 10 | 0 |
| Charlton Athletic (loan) | 2017–18 | League One | 38 | 0 | 2 | 0 | 1 | 0 | 3 (Note: One appearance in EFL Trophy, two appearances in League One play-offs) | 0 | 44 | 0 |
| Charlton Athletic (loan) | Total | | 48 | 0 | 2 | 0 | 1 | 0 | 3 | 0 | 54 | 0 |
| Bristol City (loan) | 2018–19 | Championship | 28 | 0 | 3 | 0 | 1 | 0 | — | | 32 | 0 |
| Bristol City | 2019–20 | Championship | 24 | 0 | 1 | 0 | 0 | 0 | — | | 25 | 0 |
| Bristol City | 2020–21 | Championship | 11 | 1 | 0 | 0 | 1 | 0 | — | | 12 | 1 |
| Bristol City | 2021–22 | Championship | 36 | 1 | 1 | 0 | 0 | 0 | — | | 37 | 1 |
| Bristol City | 2022–23 | Championship | 34 | 0 | 3 | 0 | 1 | 0 | — | | 38 | 0 |
| Bristol City | Bristol total | | 133 | 2 | 8 | 0 | 3 | 0 | — | | 144 | 2 |
| Coventry City | 2023–24 | Championship | 37 | 0 | 5 | 0 | 0 | 0 | — | | 42 | 0 |
| Coventry City | 2024–25 | Championship | 31 | 0 | 2 | 0 | 2 | 0 | 2 (Note: Appearances in EFL Championship play-offs) | 0 | 37 | 0 |
| Coventry City | 2025–26 | Championship | 42 | 0 | 0 | 0 | 1 | 0 | — | | 43 | 0 |
| Coventry City | 2026–27 | Premier League | 10 | 1 | 0 | 0 | 0 | 0 | — | | 10 | 1 |
| Coventry City | Total | | 120 | 1 | 7 | 0 | 3 | 0 | 2 | 0 | 132 | 1 |
| Career total | | | 301 | 3 | 17 | 0 | 7 | 0 | 7 | 0 | 332 | 3 |

=== International ===
As of match played 17 November 2026

Appearances and goals by national team and year
| National team | Year | Apps | Goals |
|---|---|---|---|
| Wales | 2024 | 2 | 0 |
| Wales | 2025 | 5 | 0 |
| Wales | 2026 | 8 | 0 |
| Total | | 15 | 0 |

== Honours ==
Chelsea Reserves

- FA Youth Cup: 2013–14, 2014–15, 2015–16
- UEFA Youth League: 2014–15, 2015–16

Coventry City

- EFL Championship: 2025–26

England U19

- UEFA European Under-19 Championship: 2017

England U21

- Toulon Tournament: 2018

Individual

- Charlton Athletic Fans' Player of the Year: 2017–18
