= Matt Grimes =

English footballer (born 1995)

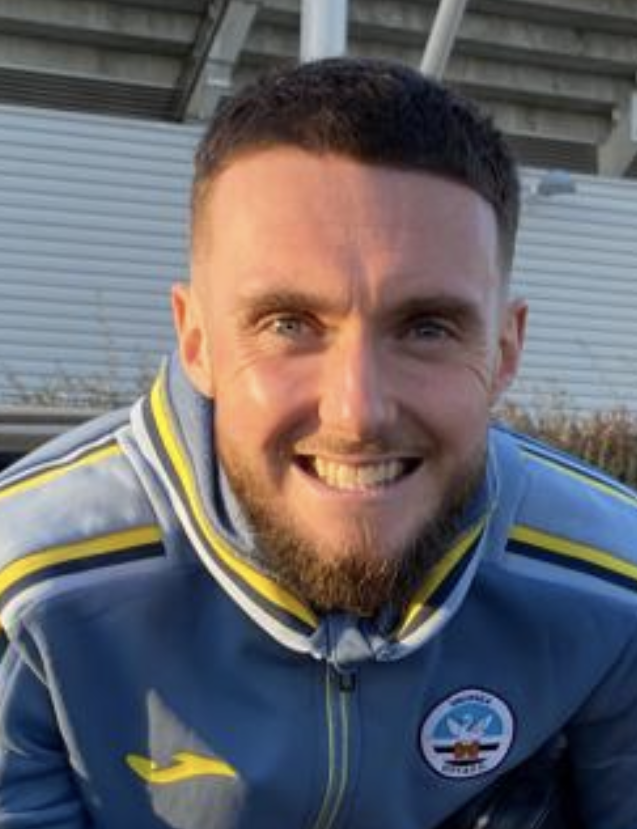
- Grimes with Swansea City in 2022

Personal information
- Full name: Matthew Jacob Grimes
- Date of birth: 15 July 1995 (age 31)
- Place of birth: Exeter, Devon, England
- Height: 5 ft 11 in (1.81 m)
- Position: Midfielder

Team information
- Current team: Coventry City
- Number: 6

Youth career
- –2013: Exeter City

Senior career*
Years	Team	Apps	(Gls)
2013–2015	Exeter City	58	(5)
2015–2025	Swansea City	305	(10)
2016	→ Blackburn Rovers (loan)	13	(0)
2016–2017	→ Leeds United (loan)	7	(0)
2017–2018	→ Northampton Town (loan)	44	(4)
2025–	Coventry City	73	(4)

International career
2014–2015	England U20	12	(1)
2016	England U21	4	(0)
- * Club domestic league appearances and goals as of 13 October 2026

Matthew Jacob Grimes (born 15 July 1995) is an English professional footballer who plays as a midfielder for and is the captain of Premier League club Coventry City.

He began his career at Exeter City, where he made his professional debut in League Two in August 2013. In January 2015, he was signed by Premier League club Swansea for an undisclosed fee believed to be around £1.75 million. Grimes has also represented England at under-20 and under-21 level.

== Club career ==
=== Exeter City ===
Born in Exeter, Devon, Grimes came through his hometown club Exeter City's academy and was given a professional contract by the club in April 2013. He made his League Two debut on 17 August 2013 in a 2–0 victory over AFC Wimbledon at St James Park. In February 2014, Exeter City manager Paul Tisdale described Grimes as the best young player he had seen in his 8 years at the club praising his technical ability and reading of the game. On 18 April, away at Chesterfield's Proact Stadium, he scored his first professional goal for relegation-threatened Exeter, a deflected free kick in the 18th minute to open a 1–1 draw against the highly ranked opponents. Grimes won Exeter's player of the season award at the end of the 2013–14 season and that summer committed his immediate future to the club despite reported interest from various Premier League sides.

Despite leaving the division halfway through the season when he signed for Swansea, Grimes was chosen in League Two's PFA Team of the Year for the 2014–15 season.

=== Swansea City ===
On 2 January 2015, Grimes signed for Premier League side Swansea City with Exeter City receiving an undisclosed club record fee, believed to be in the region of £1.75 million. He completed 90 minutes for the Swansea under-21 side in a 2–1 win against Queens Park Rangers on 27 January. On 1 February, Grimes was called up a Swansea matchday squad for the first time, remaining an unused substitute as they won 1–0 away to Southampton. His debut for the team came on 4 April, as a 90th-minute substitute for Jonjo Shelvey in a 3–1 win over Hull City at the Liberty Stadium. He scored his first goal for the club against York City in a 3–0 home win in the League Cup second round on 25 August 2015.

==== Blackburn Rovers (loan) ====
On 13 February 2016, Grimes joined Championship club Blackburn Rovers on a loan deal lasting until the end of the season, making 12 appearances.

==== Leeds United loan spell (2016–17) ====
On 6 July, Grimes returned to the Championship, joining Leeds United on a season-long loan, signed by his former Swansea manager Garry Monk and assistant Pep Clotet. On 5 August, Grimes was given the squad number 16 shirt for the 2016–17 season. On 7 August, Grimes made his Leeds debut against QPR in a 3–0 defeat. His last appearance for Leeds, was against Sutton United on 29 January 2017 in the FA Cup in Leeds' shock cup exit.

On 17 May 2017, after failing to break into the Leeds team, it was announced that Grimes would be returning to Swansea upon the expiry of his loan deal. After the spell Grimes described his time at the club, "I took a bit of a knocking going to Leeds, it just didn't happen for me."

==== Northampton Town loan spell (2017–18) ====
On 18 August 2017, it was confirmed that Grimes would be playing football for Northampton Town for the rest of the season. He made 47 appearances in all competitions scoring 4 goals during his season at Northampton, after being unable to help them avoid relegation from EFL League One.

==== Return to Swansea City ====
Grimes was recalled to play for Swansea following the club's relegation from the Premier League. He scored his first goal of the season in a 3–2 loss against Manchester City in the FA Cup. Before the start of the 2019–20 season, Grimes was named club captain, replacing the departing Leroy Fer. Grimes went on to make his 200th appearance across all competitions for Swansea City on 15 April 2022 in a 1–1 draw with Barnsley. On 27 April 2024, he made his 300th appearance for the club and scored the tying goal on a penalty kick in a 2–2 draw with Norwich City.

=== Coventry City ===
On 31 January 2025, Grimes signed for Championship side Coventry City on a three-and-a-half year deal for an undisclosed fee, reported to be between £3.5 million and £4 million, the fee broken down into installments paid over 40 months. On 14 April, he scored his first goal for the club in a 1–1 away draw against Hull City. Later that year, on 11 September, he was named as club captain following the departure of Ben Sheaf.

== International career ==
On 28 August 2014, Grimes received his first call-up to the England national under-20 team for the friendly match against Romania. In March 2015, Grimes came off the bench to captain the Under 20s in a win against Mexico. He also scored a penalty in the eventual shoot-out following a 1–1 draw. 4 days later, he started as captain at Home Park in 2–1 win over the United States, wearing the number 7 shirt.

In February 2025, the Football Association of Wales expressed an interest in selecting Grimes for international duty if eligibility rules changed to allow it. Under the home nations agreement, Grimes is currently ineligible to represent Wales as he was not born in the territory, has no parents or grandparents born in the territory, and did not have at least 5 years of education before the age of 18 in the territory. Under the FAW's proposals, a player would become eligible to represent a home nation if he is registered as a player for at least 5 years with a club within the relevant territory. The proposal would need the support of The Football Association, Scottish Football Association and Irish Football Association to pass.

== Personal life ==
As a 15-year-old he was part of St Peter's AirBadgers Ultimate Frisbee team that won the Junior National Championships for the third year in a row in 2011. He was voted the most valuable player as AirBadgers beat Brighton in the final 13–1.

Matt has a younger brother - Nick, who is a semi-professional footballer, playing as a defender. Nick Grimes is currently the captain for Southern Football League side Taunton Town.

== Career statistics ==
As of match played 21 November 2026

Appearances and goals by club, season and competition
Club	Season	League			FA Cup		League Cup		Other		Total	
Club	Season	Division	Apps	Goals	Apps	Goals	Apps	Goals	Apps	Goals	Apps	Goals
Exeter City	2013–14	League Two	35	1	1	0	0	0	1 (Note: Appearances in the EFL Trophy)	0	37	1
Exeter City	2014–15	League Two	23	4	1	0	1	0	—		25	4
Exeter City	Total		58	5	2	0	1	0	1	0	62	5
Swansea City	2014–15	Premier League	3	0	0	0	0	0	—		3	0
Swansea City	2015–16	Premier League	1	0	1	0	2	1	—		4	1
Swansea City	2016–17	Premier League	0	0	0	0	0	0	—		0	0
Swansea City	2017–18	Premier League	0	0	0	0	0	0	—		0	0
Swansea City	2018–19	Championship	45	1	4	1	1	0	—		50	2
Swansea City	2019–20	Championship	46	0	0	0	1	0	2 (Note: Appearances in the EFL Championship play-offs)	0	49	0
Swansea City	2020–21	Championship	45	2	2	2	1	0	3	1	51	5
Swansea City	2021–22	Championship	46	0	1	0	1	0	—		48	0
Swansea City	2022–23	Championship	44	1	2	0	0	0	—		46	1
Swansea City	2023–24	Championship	46	4	2	0	2	1	—		50	5
Swansea City	2024–25	Championship	29	2	1	0	2	0	—		32	2
Swansea City	Total		305	10	13	3	10	2	5	1	333	16
Blackburn Rovers (loan)	2015–16	Championship	13	0	—		—		—		13	0
Leeds United (loan)	2016–17	Championship	7	0	2	0	3	0	—		12	0
Northampton Town (loan)	2017–18	League One	44	4	0	0	0	0	3	0	47	4
Coventry City	2024–25	Championship	16	2	—		—		2	0	18	2
Coventry City	2025–26	Championship	46	2	0	0	2	0	—		48	2
Coventry City	2026–27	Premier League	11	0	0	0	0	0	—		11	0
Coventry City	Total		73	4	0	0	2	0	2	0	77	4
Career total			500	23	17	3	16	2	11	1	544	29

== Honours ==
Coventry City

- EFL Championship: 2025–26

England U21

- Toulon Tournament: 2016

Individual

- PFA Team of the Year: 2014–15 League Two, 2025–26 Championship
- Exeter City Player of the Season: 2013–14
- Swansea City Player of the Year: 2018–19
- EFL Championship Team of the Year: 2025–26
