= Victor Torp =

Danish footballer (born 1999)

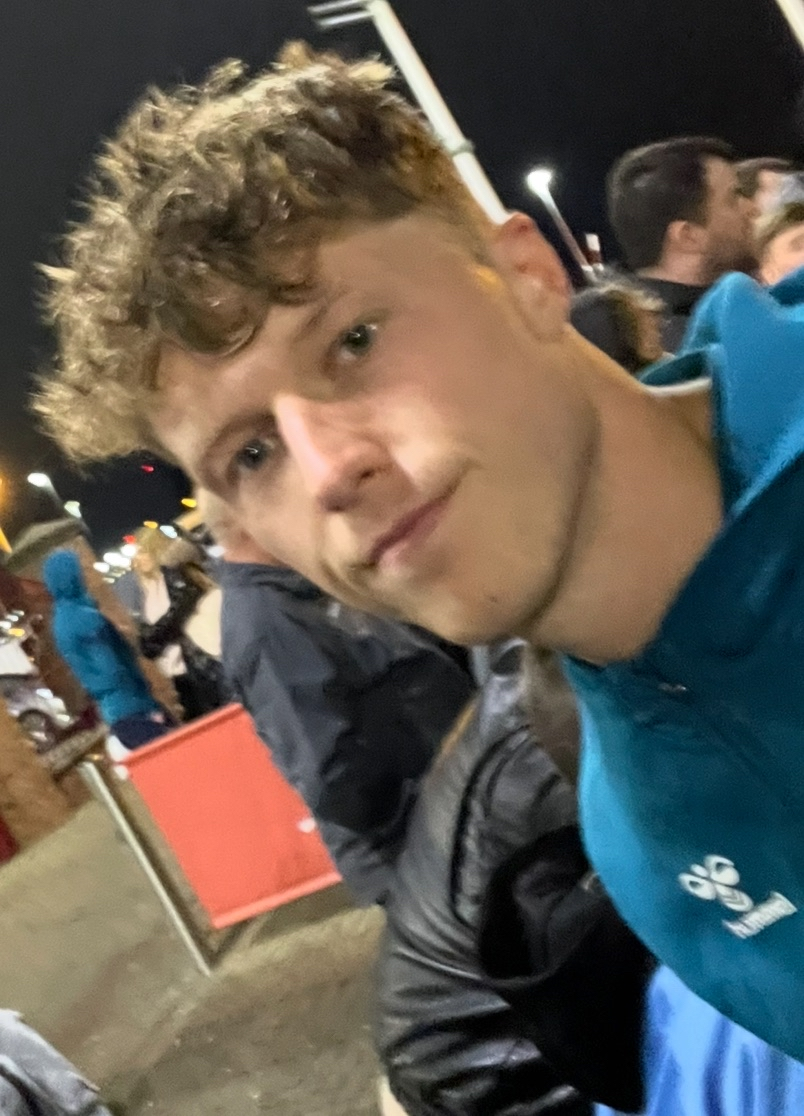
- Torp in 2024

Personal information
- Full name: Victor Torp Overgaard
- Date of birth: 30 July 1999 (age 27)
- Place of birth: Lemvig, Denmark
- Height: 1.78 m (5 ft 10 in)
- Positions: Midfielder; forward

Team information
- Current team: Coventry City
- Number: 29

Youth career
- Lemvig GF
- Midtjylland

Senior career*
Years	Team	Apps	(Gls)
2018–2022	Midtjylland	1	(0)
2018–2019	→ Fredericia (loan)	19	(4)
2020	→ Fredericia (loan)	15	(5)
2020–2021	→ Lyngby (loan)	30	(4)
2021–2022	→ Kortrijk (loan)	9	(0)
2022–2024	Sarpsborg 08	43	(8)
2024–	Coventry City	97	(16)

International career
2016	Denmark U17	8	(1)
2016–2017	Denmark U18	5	(0)
2017–2018	Denmark U19	12	(2)
2018	Denmark U20	2	(0)
- * Club domestic league appearances and goals as of 21 November 2026

Victor Torp Overgaard (born 30 July 1999) is a Danish professional footballer who plays as a midfielder or forward for Premier League club Coventry City. He is a former Denmark youth international.

== Club career ==
=== Midtjylland ===
Torp started playing football in Lemvig, northwest Jutland, on the banks of the Limfjord when he joined Lemvig GF. Later he was scouted to the youth team of Midtjylland.

==== Fredericia (loans) ====
Shortly before his 19th birthday, Torp and his two teammates Sebastian Buch Jensen and Henry Uzochukwu were sent on loan to the second division club Fredericia.

On 29 July 2018, he made his senior debut when he was in the starting line-up in the 3–2 defeat at Næstved, in which he scored a goal in the 37th minute for the temporary 2–1 lead. In the first half of the season, Torp, mostly used as a right midfielder, was utilised in every game, but in the training camp before the start of the second half of the season he suffered an abdominal injury and then fell out because of an inflammation in the lower part of the abdomen around the pubic bone.

His loan deal then expired and he returned to Midtjylland. However, Torp did not make a competitive appearance for Midtjylland. In January 2020, he was sent on loan again to Fredericia. After he had recovered, Torp played regularly and was used in all games.

==== Lyngby (loan) ====
After his loan expired, he returned to Midtjylland, but was then loaned out once again, this time to league rivals Lyngby. Mostly playing as a central midfielder, Torp quickly became a starter for the relegation candidate. On 1 December 2020, he scored his first goal in the Danish Superliga in a 2–2 away draw against Copenhagen.

He suffered relegation to the Danish 1st Division with the club on 9 May 2021 after a loss to last placed Horsens, before returning to Midtjylland.

==== Kortrijk (loan) ====
On 31 August 2021, Torp was loaned out to Belgian First Division A club Kortrijk for the 2021–22 season.

=== Sarpsborg 08 ===
On 8 June 2022, 22-year old Torp signed a three-year deal with Norwegian Eliteserien club Sarpsborg 08. Torp scored on his league debut against Strømsgodset on 7 August, his team's only goal in a 3–1 away loss. The club concluded the season in eight place, and Torp played as a starter in the second half of the season, contributing with two goals in 13 appearances.

Torp emerged as a pivotal figure in the midfield for Sarpsborg in the subsequent season, registering seven goals in 33 overall appearances. Among these, he started in 30 matches, contributing significantly to the team's eighth-place finish in the league table.

=== Coventry City ===
On 11 January 2024, Torp officially signed a four-and-a-half-year deal for £2 million with EFL Championship club Coventry City. His transfer was contingent upon receiving international clearance. On 26 January, Torp scored his first goal on his debut for the club in a FA Cup fourth round match against Sheffield Wednesday which the result ended in a 1–1 draw. On 26 October 2024, Torp scored his first Championship goal for Coventry City in a 3–2 home win against Luton Town.

On 29 May 2026, after Coventry won promotion to the Premiership, the club announced Torp had signed a new contract.

== International career ==
Torp gained eight caps for the Denmark under-17 team in 2016, scoring one goal, and took part in the 2016 UEFA European Under-17 Championship in Azerbaijan at that age level. There, Denmark were eliminated after the group stage; Torp was utilised in all games. From 2016 to 2017, he played in five friendly matches for the under-18 team.

He was part of the Danish under-19 team from 2017 to 2018 and played 12 games in which he scored two goals. He also took part in the 2018 UEFA European Under-19 Championship qualification for the tournament in Finland, which Denmark missed out on. In 2018, Torp played two friendlies for the under-20 team.

On 14 November 2020, he received his first call-up for the Denmark U21 team, when he was selected for the squad for the 2021 European Under-21 Championship qualifier against Romania.

== Career statistics ==
As of match played 21 November 2026

Appearances and goals by club, season and competition
Club	Season	League			National cup (Note: Includes Danish Cup, Belgian Cup, Norwegian Cup, FA Cup)		League cup (Note: Includes EFL Cup)		Other		Total	
Club	Season	Division	Apps	Goals	Apps	Goals	Apps	Goals	Apps	Goals	Apps	Goals
Midtjylland	2021–22	Danish Superliga	1	0	—		—		0	0	1	0
Fredericia (loan)	2018–19	Danish 1st Division	19	4	0	0	—		—		19	4
Fredericia (loan)	2019–20	Danish 1st Division	15	5	0	0	—		—		15	5
Fredericia (loan)	Total		34	9	0	0	—		—		34	9
Lyngby (loan)	2020–21	Danish Superliga	30	4	1	0	—		—		31	4
Kortrijk (loan)	2021–22	Belgian Pro League	9	0	2	0	—		—		11	0
Sarpsborg 08	2022	Eliteserien	13	2	0	0	—		—		13	2
Sarpsborg 08	2023	Eliteserien	30	6	3	1	—		—		33	7
Sarpsborg 08	Total		43	8	3	1	—		—		46	9
Coventry City	2023–24	Championship	15	0	5	1	—		—		20	1
Coventry City	2024–25	Championship	36	6	2	0	3	0	0	0	41	6
Coventry City	2025–26	Championship	39	10	0	0	2	0	—		41	10
Coventry City	2026–27	Premier League	7	0	0	0	2	2	—		9	2
Coventry City	Total		97	16	7	1	7	2	0	0	111	19
Career total			214	37	13	2	7	2	0	0	234	41

== Honours ==
FC Midtjyland U19

- U19 Ligaen: 2015–16, 2017–18

Coventry City

- EFL Championship: 2025–26
