= Greg Sandiford =

Grenadian footballer (born 2005)

Personal information
- Full name: Gregory Sandiford Junior
- Date of birth: 7 May 2005 (age 21)
- Place of birth: Luton, England
- Height: 1.78 m (5 ft 10 in)
- Position: Right-back

Youth career
- Cambridge United

Senior career*
Years	Team	Apps	(Gls)
2022–2024	Cambridge United	0	(0)
2022	→St Ives Town (loan)	0	(0)
2023	→Biggleswade Town (loan)	10	(0)
2023–2024	→Royston Town (loan)	20	(1)
2024	→Berkhamsted (loan)	12	(0)
2024–2026	Coventry City	0	(0)
2025–2026	→Bedford Town (loan)	34	(0)
2026–	Larne	0	(0)

International career^{‡}
2024–	Grenada	3	(0)
- * Club domestic league appearances and goals as of 20:25, 18 April 2026 (UTC) ‡ National team caps and goals as of 20:25, 18 April 2026 (UTC)

Gregory Sandiford Junior (born 7 May 2005) is a professional footballer who plays as a right-back for NIFL Premiership club Larne. Born in England, he plays for the Grenada national team.

== Club career ==
A youth product of Cambridge United, Sandiford began his senior career on loan with St Ives Town in 2022 and Biggleswade Town in 2023 in the Southern Football League. On 28 June 2023, he signed a professional contract with Cambridge United for a season. From there, he went on loan to Royston Town and then Berkhamsted again in the Southern Football League on 2 March 2023.

Sandiford signed a professional contract with Coventry City on 3 July 2024 and was assigned to their U21s. On 1 July 2025 extended his contract with the club for another season. In the summer of 2025, he joined Bedford Town on a short-term loan in the National League North, and on 23 December 2025 extended his loan for the rest of the 2025–26 season.

== International career ==
Born in England, Sandiford is of Grenadian descent. He was called up to the Grenada national team for a set of 2024–25 CONCACAF Nations League matches in September 2024. On 24 March 2026, he was called up to Grenada for a set of 2026 FIFA Series matches.
