= Miguel Ángel Brau =

Spanish footballer (born 2001)

Personal information
- Full name: Miguel Ángel Brau Blánquez
- Date of birth: 27 December 2001 (age 24)
- Place of birth: Cartagena, Spain
- Height: 1.83 m (6 ft 0 in)
- Position: Left-back

Team information
- Current team: Académico de Viseu (on loan from Coventry City)
- Number: 3

Youth career
- Torre Pacheco
- 2019–2020: Granada

Senior career*
Years	Team	Apps	(Gls)
2020–2024	Granada B	51	(0)
2022–2023	→ Talavera (loan)	31	(2)
2024–2025	Granada	27	(2)
2025–	Coventry City	9	(0)
2026–	→ Académico de Viseu (loan)	1	(0)
- * Club domestic league appearances and goals as of 6 September 2026

Miguel Ángel Brau Blánquez (born 27 December 2001) is a Spanish professional footballer who plays as a left-back for Primeira Liga club Académico de Viseu, on loan from Premier League club Coventry City.

== Career ==
=== Granada ===
Born in Cartagena, Region of Murcia, Brau joined Granada's youth sides in 2019, from EF Torre Pacheco. He made his senior debut with the reserves on 8 November 2020, starting in a 1–1 Segunda División B home draw against Córdoba.

On 11 February 2021, Brau renewed his contract with the Nazaríes until 2023. On 2 September 2022, he was loaned to Primera Federación side Talavera for the season.

A regular starter as Talavera suffered relegation, Brau suffered a knee injury in May and returned to Granada in July 2023, being back to the B-side now also in the third division. After returning to action in March 2024, he made his first team – and La Liga – debut on 24 May, coming on as a second-half substitute for Faitout Maouassa in a 7–0 away loss to Girona.

Brau scored his first professional goal on 22 October 2024, netting his team's second in a 3–2 away win over Castellón.

=== Coventry City ===
Brau moved abroad for the first time in his career on 19 June 2025, after agreeing to a four-year contract with EFL Championship club Coventry City.

==== Loan to Académico de Viseu ====
On 28 August 2026, Beau joined Portuguese Primeira Liga club Académico de Viseu on a season-long loan.

== Personal life ==
Brau's father, also named Miguel Ángel, was also a footballer. A centre-back, he played in the top tier with Albacete and in the Segunda División with Atlético Madrid B.

== Honours ==
Coventry City

- EFL Championship: 2025–26
