= Jahnoah Markelo =

Dutch footballer (born 2003)

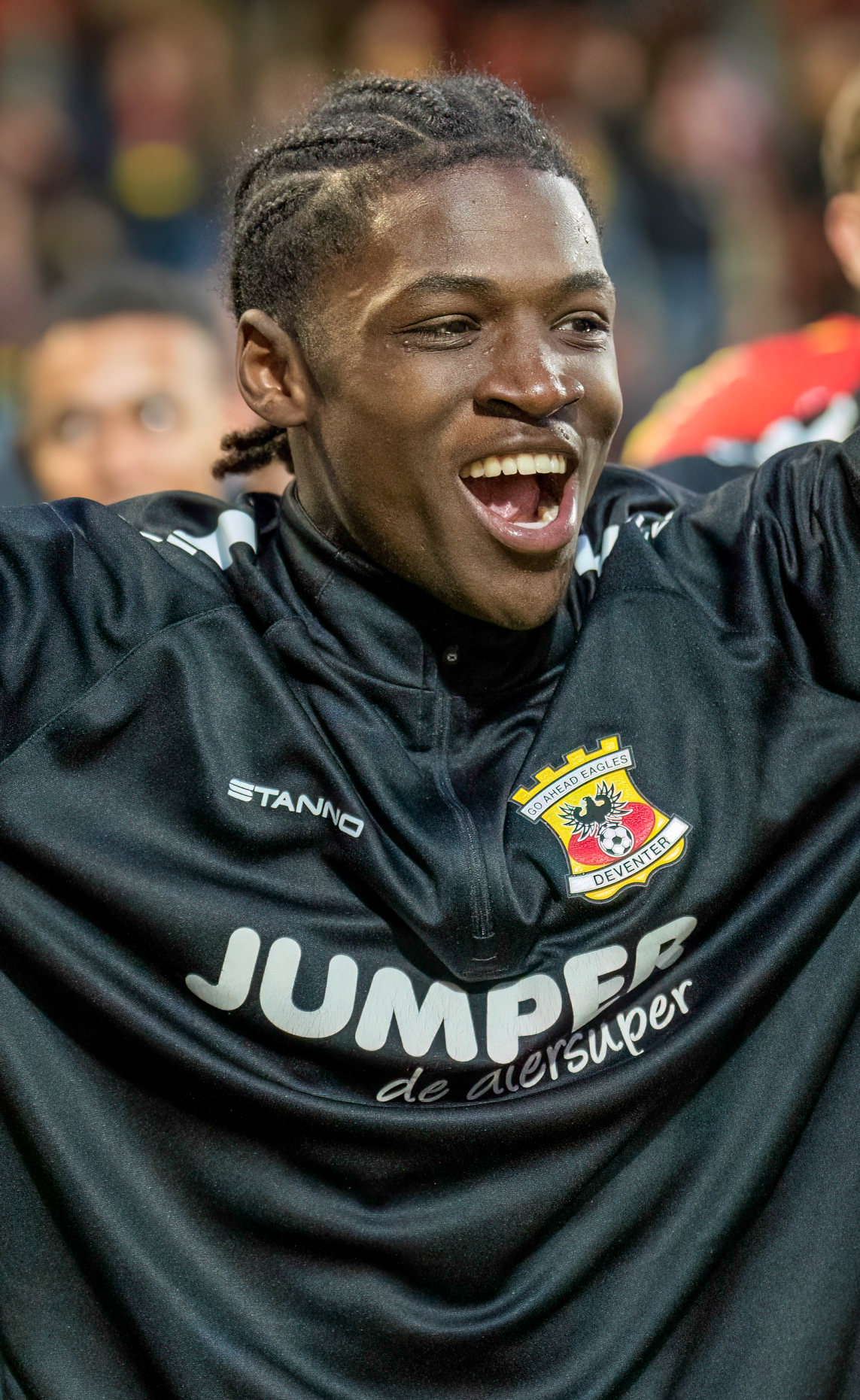
- Markelo in 2023

Personal information
- Full name: Jahnoah Guevara Markelo
- Date of birth: 4 January 2003 (age 23)
- Place of birth: Amsterdam, Netherlands
- Height: 1.72 m (5 ft 8 in)
- Position: Winger

Team information
- Current team: Shabab Al Ahli

Youth career
- ASV De Dijk
- –2013: AVV Zeeburgia
- 2013–2019: Ajax
- 2019–2021: Twente

Senior career*
Years	Team	Apps	(Gls)
2021–2022	Twente	0	(0)
2022–2023	Go Ahead Eagles	5	(0)
2023–2024	Kustošija	18	(7)
2024	Celje	0	(0)
2024	Zürich II	6	(1)
2024–2026	Zürich	40	(6)
2026	Coventry City	5	(0)
2026–	Shaban Al Ahli	1	(0)
- * Club domestic league appearances and goals as of 10:20, 21 August 2026 (UTC)

Jahnoah Guevara Markelo (born 4 January 2003) is a Dutch professional football player who plays as a winger for UAE Pro League club Shabab Al Ahli.

== Club career ==
On 19 May 2022, Markelo signed a three-year contract with Go Ahead Eagles.

He made his Eredivisie debut for Go Ahead Eagles on 27 August 2022 in a game against Sparta Rotterdam.

In summer 2024, Markelo moved to Slovenian PrvaLiga club NK Celje, but already on 10 September 2024, he moved to Swiss Super League club FC Zürich starting of their reserve team. However, he quickly became part of the first team, playing 26 league games and scoring 4 goals in the season for FC Zürich. In September 2025, he extended his contract with Zürich until 2030.

On 27 January 2026, Markelo joined Championship side Coventry City for an undisclosed fee signing a four-and-a-half year deal.

On 8 August 2026, Markelo joined Shabab Al Ahli in the United Arab Emirates on a four-year contract.

== International career ==
Markelo was called up to the Suriname national team for a set of 2026 FIFA World Cup qualification matches in November 2025.

== Personal life ==
Markelo was born in the Netherlands to a Curaçaoan-born father and half-Surinamese mother. His older brother Nathangelo Markelo is also a footballer.

== Honours ==
Coventry City

- EFL Championship: 2025–26
