= 2024–25 Coventry City F.C. season =

Coventry City
2024–25 season
- Owner: Doug King
- Executive chairman: Doug King
- Head coach: Mark Robins (until 7 November); Rhys Carr (caretaker, 7–28 Nov); Frank Lampard (from 28 November)
- Stadium: Coventry Building Society Arena
- Championship: 5th
- FA Cup: Fourth round
- EFL Cup: Third round
- Top goalscorer: League: Haji Wright (12); All: Haji Wright (12)
- Highest home attendance: 31,452 (Middlesbrough; 3 May 2025, Championship)
- Lowest home attendance: 11,808 (Oxford United; 27 August 2024, League Cup)
- Average home league attendance: 27,647
- Biggest win: 4–0 Plymouth Argyle (H); 26 December 2024, Championship
- Biggest defeat: 3–0 Leeds United (A); 28 September 2024, Championship; 4–1 Portsmouth (A); 21 December 2024, Championship; 4–1 Ipswich Town (H); 8 February 2025, FA Cup
Home colours	Away colours	Third colours

The 2024–25 season was the 141st season in the history of Coventry City Football Club and their fifth consecutive season in the Championship. In addition to the domestic league, the club would also participate in the FA Cup, and the EFL Cup.

== Pre-season and friendlies ==
On 24 May, Coventry City announced their first pre-season friendly, away against SV Darmstadt 98. Their second pre-season friendly was announced on 29 May, a home tie against SV Werder Bremen. On 6 June, it was announced that Coventry City would host Everton. On 14 June, it was announced that Coventry City would travel to Stevenage. On 9 July, Coventry City announced that they would travel to Getafe for a game to be played behind closed doors. Coventry City kicked of their pre season calendar with a previously unannounced behind closed doors game against Port Vale.

Win Draw Loss Fixtures

13 July 2024 Friendly	Coventry City	3–0	Port Vale	Loughborough
	Simms 14'; Rudoni 74'; Obikwu 80'	Report		Stadium: Loughborough University

19 July 2024 Friendly	(Spain) Getafe	0–0	Coventry City	Valencia
19:00 CEST		Report		Stadium: Oliva Nova Resort

23 July 2024 Friendly	Stevenage	1–3	Coventry City	Stevenage
19:00 BST	Phillips 2'	Report	Obikwu 18' (pen.); Thomas 22'; Tavares 43'	Stadium: Lamex Stadium

27 July 2024 Friendly	(Germany) Darmstadt 98	2–0	Coventry City	Darmstadt
13:30 CEST	Vukotić 75'; Lakenmacher 81'	Report	Eccles (yellow card) 40'; Latibeaudiere (yellow card) 68'	Stadium: Merck-Stadion am Böllenfalltor

30 July 2024 Friendly	Coventry City	3–0	Everton	Coventry
19:45 BST	Simms 22'; Mason-Clark 62'; Torp 76'	Report		Stadium: Coventry Building Society Arena

3 August 2024 Friendly	Coventry City	1–2	(Germany) Werder Bremen	Coventry
15:00 BST	Rudoni 29'	Report	Topp 5'; Stage 85'	Stadium: Coventry Building Society Arena

6 August 2024 Friendly	Coventry City	Cancelled	(Italy) AS Roma	Burton upon Trent
16:00 BST				Stadium: St George's Park

== Competitions ==
=== Overall record ===
Competition	First match	Last match	Starting round	Record							
Competition	First match	Last match	Starting round	Pld	W	D	L	GF	GA	GD	Win %
EFL Championship	10 August 2024	3 May 2025	Matchday 1	46	20	9	17	64	58	+6	43.48
FA Cup	10 January 2025	8 February 2025	Third round	1	0	1	0	1	1	+0	0.00
EFL Cup	13 August 2024	18 September 2024	First round	3	2	0	1	3	2	+1	66.67
Total				50	22	10	18	68	61	+7	44.00

Last updated: 3 May 2025
Source: Soccerway

=== Championship ===
==== League table ====
Pos	Team	Pld	W	D	L	GF	GA	GD	Pts	Promotion, qualification or relegation
3	Sheffield United	46	28	8	10	63	36	+27	90 (Note: Sheffield United were deducted two points for defaulting on payments to other clubs during the 2022–23 and 2023–24 seasons, with a further two points suspended.)	Qualified for the Championship play-offs
4	Sunderland (O, P)	46	21	13	12	58	44	+14	76	Qualified for the Championship play-offs
5	Coventry City	46	20	9	17	64	58	+6	69	Qualified for the Championship play-offs
6	Bristol City	46	17	17	12	59	55	+4	68	Qualified for the Championship play-offs
7	Blackburn Rovers	46	19	9	18	53	48	+5	66	

Source: English Football League
Rules for classification: 1) Points; 2) Goal difference; 3) Number of goals scored; 4) Head-to-head results; 5) Wins; 6) Away goals; 7) Penalty points (sec 9.5); 8) Number of 12-point sending off offences; 9) Play-off (only if needed to determine promotion/relegation)
(O) Play-off winners; (P) Promoted

==== Results summary ====
Overall								Home						Away					
Pld	W	D	L	GF	GA	GD	Pts	W	D	L	GF	GA	GD	W	D	L	GF	GA	GD
46	20	9	17	64	58	+6	69	14	3	6	40	24	+16	6	6	11	24	34	−10

Last updated: 3 May 2025.
Source: Soccerway

==== Results by round ====
Round	1	2	3	4	5	6	7	8	9	10	11	12	13	14	15	16	17	18	19	20	21	22	23	24	25	26	27	28	29	30	31	32	33	34	35	36	37	38	39	40	41	42	43	44	45	46
Ground	A	H	A	H	A	H	A	H	H	A	A	H	A	H	A	H	A	H	A	A	H	A	H	H	A	A	H	A	H	A	H	H	A	H	A	H	A	H	A	H	H	A	H	A	A	H
Result	L	W	D	L	D	L	L	W	L	L	D	W	W	L	D	D	L	D	W	L	W	L	W	D	D	L	W	W	W	W	L	W	W	W	W	W	L	W	L	L	W	D	W	L	L	W
Position	16	10	9	15	14	19	21	17	20	21	22	18	13	17	17	17	17	16	14	16	15	17	15	15	14	15	14	13	12	11	11	10	7	7	5	5	6	5	5	7	6	6	6	6	6	5

Source: EFL
A = Away; H = Home; W = Win; D = Draw; L = Loss; P = Postponed

==== Matches ====
The league fixtures were announced on 26 June 2024.

Win Draw Loss Fixtures

10 August 2024 1	Stoke City	1–0	Coventry City	Stoke-on-Trent
12:30 BST	Thompson (yellow card) 69'; Baker 78'; Laurent (yellow card) 90+1'	Report	Binks (yellow card) 3'	Stadium: Bet365 Stadium; Attendance: 25,037; Referee: Gavin Ward

16 August 2024 2	Coventry City	3–2	Oxford United	Coventry
20:00 BST	Wright 15', 90+6'; Van Ewijk 31'	Report	Bennett (yellow card) 16'; Brown 22'; Harris 55'; Goodrham (yellow card) 59'	Stadium: Coventry Building Society Arena; Attendance: 28,051; Referee: David Coote
Note: Fixture was initially scheduled for 17 August, but was moved for live Sky Sports broadcast.

24 August 2024 3	Bristol City	1–1	Coventry City	Bristol
12:30 BST	Tanner 45+2', (yellow card) 74'; Williams (yellow card) 77'	Report	Bidwell (yellow card) 40'; Palmer 76', (yellow card) 87'; Wright (yellow card) 77'; Binks (yellow card) 81'	Stadium: Ashton Gate; Attendance: 21,545; Referee: Andrew Kitchen
Note: Fixture was initially scheduled for a 15:00 kick-off, but was moved for live Sky Sports broadcast.

31 August 2024 4	Coventry City	0–1	Norwich City	Coventry
12:30 BST	Latibeaudiere (yellow card) 45+2'; Binks (yellow card) 64'; Bassette (yellow card) 70'; Eccles (yellow card) 82'	Report	Sainz 49', (yellow card) 64'; Slimane (yellow card) 90+2'; Gunn (yellow card) 90+3'	Stadium: Coventry Building Society Arena; Attendance: 27,353; Referee: Andy Davies
Note: Fixture was initially scheduled for a 15:00 kick-off, but was moved for live Sky Sports broadcast.

14 September 2024 5	Watford	1–1	Coventry City	Watford
15:00 BST	Pollock (yellow card) 38'; Dele-Bashiru 67'; Porteous (yellow card) 90+12'	Report	Simms 4'; Torp (yellow card) 44'; Latibeaudiere (yellow card) 45'	Stadium: Vicarage Road; Attendance: 19,441; Referee: Bobby Madley

21 September 2024 6	Coventry City	1–2	Swansea City	Coventry
15:00 BST	Ronald 34' (o.g.); Thomas-Asante (yellow card) 52'; Eccles (yellow card) 90'	Report	Cullen 8'; Cooper 32'; Tymon (yellow card) 86'; Franco (yellow card) 86'; Fulton (yellow card) 90+5'	Stadium: Coventry Building Society Arena; Attendance: 26,273; Referee: James Linington

28 September 2024 7	Leeds United	3–0	Coventry City	Leeds
15:00 BST	Gnonto 16'; Bogle 49'; Rodon (yellow card) 76'; Piroe 79'	Report	Latibeaudiere (yellow card) 84'; Eccles (yellow card) 90+5'	Stadium: Elland Road; Attendance: 36,625; Referee: Gavin Ward

1 October 2024 8	Coventry City	3–0	Blackburn Rovers	Coventry
19:45 GMT	Bidwell 11'; Wright 48'; Sheaf (yellow card) 58'; Thomas-Asante 84'	Report	Cantwell (yellow card) 60'; Carter (yellow card) 67'; Buckley (yellow card) 81'	Stadium: Coventry Building Society Arena; Attendance: 24,583; Referee: John Busby

5 October 2024 9	Coventry City	1–2	Sheffield Wednesday	Coventry
15:00 BST	Rudoni 26'; Bidwell (yellow card) 38'; Sheaf (yellow card) 43'; Eccles (yellow card) 45'; Thomas-Asante (yellow card) 87'	Report	Gassama 45+2'; Charles (yellow card) 77' (goal) 90+3'; Famewo (yellow card) 87'; Valery (yellow card) 89'	Stadium: Coventry Building Society Arena; Attendance: 28,571; Referee: Dean Whitestone

19 October 2024 10	Preston North End	1–0	Coventry City	Preston
12:30 BST	Ledson (yellow card) 4'; Riis Jakobsen (yellow card) 39', (goal) 72'; Hughes (yellow card) 42'; Woodman (yellow card) 84'	Report		Stadium: Deepdale; Attendance: 15,907; Referee: Josh Smith
Note: Fixture was initially scheduled for a 15:00 kick-off, but was moved for live Sky Sports broadcast.

22 October 2024 11	Queens Park Rangers	1–1	Coventry City	Shepherd's Bush
20:00 BST	Dembélé (yellow card) 9'; Morgan 63'; Clarke-Salter (yellow card) 75'	Report	Wright 4'; Dasilva (yellow card) 45+1'	Stadium: Loftus Road; Attendance: 14,173; Referee: James Bell
Note: Fixture was initially scheduled for a 15:00 kick-off, but was moved for live Sky Sports broadcast.

26 October 2024 12	Coventry City	3–2	Luton Town	Coventry
12:30 BST	Kitching (yellow card) 13'; Simms 59'; Torp 76'; Sheaf (yellow card) 80'; Wright 90+2'	Report	Morris 15', (yellow card) 18'; Doughty (yellow card) 17'; McGuinness (yellow card) 22'; Adebayo 37'; Holmes; Holmes (yellow card) 54' (yellow-red card) 90'	Stadium: Coventry Building Society Arena; Attendance: 26,409; Referee: Robert Madley
Note: Fixture was initially scheduled for a 15:00 kick-off, but was moved for live Sky Sports broadcast.

2 November 2024 13	Middlesbrough	0–3	Coventry City	Middlesbrough
15:00 GMT	Hackney (yellow card) 12' (yellow-red card) 22'; Edmundson (yellow card) 85'	Report	Rudoni (yellow card) 25'; Thomas-Asante (yellow card) 33'; Thomas 42', (yellow card) 45+1'; Wright 76'; Eccles 81'	Stadium: Riverside Stadium; Referee: Thomas Bramall

6 November 2024 14	Coventry City	1–2	Derby County	Coventry
19:45 GMT	Sakamoto 77'; Eccles (yellow card) 78'	Report	Yates 11'; Cashin (yellow card) 34'; Adams (yellow card) 59'; Thomas 73' (o.g.)	Stadium: Coventry Building Society Arena; Attendance: 27,243; Referee: Sam Allison

9 November 2024 15	Sunderland	2–2	Coventry City	Sunderland
15:00 GMT	Roberts (yellow card) 15'; Isidor 16', (yellow card) 69'; Cirkin 35'; Hume (yellow card) 69'	Report	Wright 62'; Latibeaudiere (yellow card) 64'; Binks (yellow card) 69'; Rudoni 84'; Sakamoto (yellow card) 90+6'; Bassette (yellow card) 90+8'	Stadium: Stadium of Light; Attendance: 43,374; Referee: Leigh Doughty

23 November 2024 16	Coventry City	2–2	Sheffield United	Coventry
12:30 GMT	Bassette 22' (yellow card) 45'; Thomas 80'; Thomas-Asante (yellow card) 60'; Eccles (yellow card) 72'; Rudoni (yellow card) 81'	Report	Canpbell 13'; Rak-Sakyi 80'; Ahmedhodžić (red card) 44'; Burrows (yellow card) 60'; Peck (yellow card) 79'	Stadium: Coventry Building Society Arena; Attendance: 28,057; Referee: Darren Bond
Note: Fixture was initially scheduled for a 15:00 kick-off, but was moved for live Sky Sports broadcast.

26 November 2024 17	Burnley	2–0	Coventry City	Burnley
19:45 GMT	Sarmiento 47'; Egan-Riley 80'; Trafford (yellow card) 90+4'	Report	Bassette (yellow card) 29'	Stadium: Turf Moor; Attendance: 18,293; Referee: Anthony Blackhouse

30 November 2024 18	Coventry City	2–2	Cardiff City	Coventry
15:00 GMT	Mason-Clark 7'; Torp 88' (pen.); Sakamoto (yellow card) 45+1'	Report	Meite 4'; Robertson 48' (yellow card) 88'; O'Dowda (yellow card) 11'; Turnbull (yellow card) 39'; Chambers (yellow card) 58'; Alnwick (yellow card) 88'	Stadium: Coventry Building Society Arena; Attendance: 27,137; Referee: James Bell

7 December 2024 19	Millwall	0–1	Coventry City	Bermondsey
15:00 GMT	Leonard (yellow card) 51'; McNamara (yellow card) 82'	Report	Bidwell (yellow card) 50'; Mason-Clark 63'	Stadium: The Den; Attendance: 16,460; Referee: Thomas Bramall

11 December 2024 20	West Bromwich Albion	2–0	Coventry City	West Bromwich
20:00 GMT	Mowatt 11'; Styles (yellow card) 22'; Grant 74'	Report	Thomas (yellow card) 20'	Stadium: The Hawthorns; Attendance: 24,859; Referee: John Busby
Note: Fixture was initially scheduled for a 19:45 kick-off, but was moved for live Sky Sports broadcast.

14 December 2024 21	Coventry City	2–1	Hull City	Coventry
12:30 GMT	Mason-Clark 52' (yellow card) 43'; Rudoni 72'; Torp (penalty missed) 66'; Binks (yellow card) 54'; Bassette (yellow card) 69'	Report	João Pedro 43' (yellow card) 45+4'; Pandur (yellow card) 32'; Hughes (yellow card) 54'	Stadium: Coventry Building Society Arena; Attendance: 25,528; Referee: Bobby Madley
Note: Fixture was initially scheduled for a 15:00 kick-off, but was moved for live Sky Sports broadcast.

21 December 2024 22	Portsmouth	4–1	Coventry City	Portsmouth
12:30 GMT	Lang 14', 43', 48', 55'; Pack (yellow card) 32'	Report	Bassette 3'	Stadium: Fratton Park; Attendance: 20,330; Referee: Dean Whitestone
Note: Fixture was initially scheduled for a 15:00 kick-off, but was moved for live Sky Sports broadcast.

26 December 2024 23	Coventry City	4–0	Plymouth Argyle	Coventry
15:00 GMT	Sakamoto 5'; Eccles 20', 45'; Mason-Clark 39'	Report	Szűcs (yellow card) 85'; Wright (red card) 87'	Stadium: Coventry Building Society Arena; Attendance: 29,420; Referee: Adam Herczeg

29 December 2024 24	Coventry City	0–0	Millwall	Coventry
15:00 GMT		Report	De Norre (yellow card) 85'	Stadium: Coventry Building Society Arena; Attendance: 28,216; Referee: Andrew Kitchen

1 January 2025 25	Cardiff City	1–1	Coventry City	Cardiff
15:00 GMT	Robertson 6'; Robinson (red card) 47'; Ng (yellow card) 83'; Alnwick (yellow card) 90+4'	Report	Sakamoto 46'	Stadium: Cardiff City Stadium; Attendance: 19,045; Referee: Geoff Eltringham

4 January 2025 26	Norwich City	2–1	Coventry City	Norwich
15:00 GMT	Amankwah 90+1', 90+5'; Marcondes (yellow card) 90+5'	Report	Van Ewijk 24'; Sheaf (yellow card) 34'; Eccles (yellow card) 68'	Stadium: Carrow Road; Attendance: 26,682; Referee: James Bell

18 January 2025 27	Coventry City	1–0	Bristol City	Coventry
15:00 GMT	Thomas-Asante 60'	Report		Stadium: Coventry Building Society Arena; Attendance: 26,695; Referee: Lewis Smith

21 January 2025 28	Blackburn Rovers	0–2	Coventry City	Blackburn
19:45 GMT		Report	Binks (yellow card) 37'; Simms 41'; Thomas-Asante 48'	Stadium: Ewood Park; Attendance: 12,819; Referee: Oliver Langford

25 January 2025 29	Coventry City	2–1	Watford	Coventry
15:00 GMT	Torp 32', 75' (yellow card) 50'; Rudoni (yellow card) 87'; Kitching (yellow card) 90'	Report	Kitching 82' (o.g.); Kayembe (yellow card) 21'; Morris (yellow card) 51'; Larouci (yellow card) 64'; Sissoko (yellow card) 90+7'	Stadium: Coventry Building Society Arena; Attendance: 27,078; Referee: Martin Coy

1 February 2025 30	Swansea City	0–2	Coventry City	Swansea
15:00 GMT	Delcroix (yellow card) 12'; Christie (yellow card) 41'	Report	Simms 17'; Thomas-Asante 44'	Stadium: Swansea.com Stadium; Attendance: 15,189; Referee: Sam Allison

5 February 2025 31	Coventry City	0–2	Leeds United	Coventry
19:45 GMT	Bidwell (yellow card) 39'; Sakamoto (yellow card) 90+4'	Report	Piroe 17'; Bogle 26'; Ampadu (yellow card) 39'	Stadium: Coventry Building Society Arena; Attendance: 28,008; Referee: Dean Whitestone
Note: Fixture was initially scheduled for 8 February, but was moved due to both sides involvements in the FA Cup.

11 February 2025 32	Coventry City	1–0	Queens Park Rangers	Coventry
19:45 GMT	Thomas 90+4'; Kitching (yellow card) 11'; Grimes (yellow card) 62'; Mason-Clark (yellow card) 90+2'	Report	Paal (yellow card) 25'; Dunne (yellow card) 90+2'	Stadium: Coventry Building Society Arena; Attendance: 24,600; Referee: Will Finnie

15 February 2025 33	Sheffield Wednesday	1–2	Coventry City	Sheffield
15:00 GMT	Latibeaudiere 62' (o.g.)	Report	Simms 16', 90+2', (yellow card) 83'	Stadium: Hillsborough Stadium; Attendance: 28,121; Referee: Josh Smith

22 February 2025 34	Coventry City	2–1	Preston North End	Coventry
15:00 GMT	Rudoni 30'; Thomas 37'	Report	Keane 82'	Stadium: Coventry Building Society Arena; Attendance: 26,493; Referee: Oliver Langford

1 March 2025 35	Oxford United	2–3	Coventry City	Oxford
12:30 GMT	Brannagan (yellow card) 41'; Brown (yellow card) 45+4'; Romeny 53', (yellow card) 57'; Moore 62'	Report	Rudoni 7'; Sakamoto (yellow card) 18', (goal) 71'; Mason-Clark 58'; Simms (penalty missed) 67'; Kitching (yellow card) 87'; Dovin (yellow card) 89'	Stadium: Kassam Stadium; Attendance: 11,405; Referee: Jeremy Simpson
Note: Fixture was initially scheduled for a 15:00 kick-off, but was moved for live Sky Sports broadcasting.

8 March 2025 36	Coventry City	3–2	Stoke City	Coventry
12:30 GMT	Torp 22', 31'; Thomas 90+7'; Grimes (yellow card) 89'	Report	Gallagher 65', 86'; Phillips (yellow card) 77'; Burger (yellow card) 90'; Tchamadeu (yellow card) 90+6'	Stadium: Coventry Building Society Arena; Attendance: 30,011; Referee: David Webb
Note: Fixture was initially scheduled for a 15:00 kick-off, but was moved for live Sky Sports broadcasting.

11 March 2025 37	Derby County	2–0	Coventry City	Derby
19:45 GMT	Clarke 23'; Armstrong (yellow card) 28'; Harness 48', (yellow card) 54'	Report	Bidwell (yellow card) 46'	Stadium: Pride Park Stadium; Attendance: 28,879; Referee: Sam Allison

15 March 2025 38	Coventry City	3–0	Sunderland	Coventry
15:00 GMT	Wright 21', 29' (pen.), 73'; Kitching (yellow card) 65'	Report	Hume (yellow card) 54'; Rigg (yellow card) 56'	Stadium: Coventry Building Society Arena; Attendance: 30,219; Referee: Dean Whitestone

28 March 2025 39	Sheffield United	3–1	Coventry City	Sheffield
20:00 GMT	Hamer 18'; Campbell 30'; Brewster 62'; Brereton Díaz (yellow card) 65'	Report	Rudoni 90+2'; Thomas (yellow card) 17'; Allen (yellow card) 65'	Stadium: Bramall Lane; Attendance: 30,803; Referee: Oliver Langford
Note: Fixture was initially scheduled for 29 March, but was moved for live Sky Sports broadcasting.

5 April 2025 40	Coventry City	1–2	Burnley	Coventry
12:30 BST	Wright 5'; Kitching (yellow card) 18'; Van Ewijk (yellow card) 90+1'	Report	Anthony 16', 46'; Brownhill (yellow card) 19'; Egan-Riley (yellow card) 70'; Mejbri (yellow card) 85'; Laurent (yellow card) 90+7'	Stadium: Coventry Building Society Arena; Attendance: 28,704; Referee: James Bell
Note: Fixture was initially scheduled for a 15:00 kick-off, but was moved for live Sky Sports broadcasting.

9 April 2025 41	Coventry City	1–0	Portsmouth	Coventry
20:00 BST	Paterson 90+4', (yellow card) 90+6'	Report	Murphy (yellow card) 37'; Ogilvie (yellow card) 69'; Bramall (yellow card) 90+2'	Stadium: Coventry Building Society Arena; Attendance: 28,411; Referee: Gavin Ward
Note: Fixture was initially scheduled for a 19:45 kick-off, but was moved for live Sky Sports broadcasting.

14 April 2025 42	Hull City	1–1	Coventry City	Hull
20:00 BST	Kamara 82'	Report	Grimes 46'; Collins (yellow card) 76'	Stadium: MKM Stadium; Attendance: 21,659; Referee: Andrew Kitchen
Note: Fixture was initially scheduled for 12 April with a 15:00 kick-off, but was moved for live Sky Sports broadcasting.

18 April 2025 43	Coventry City	2–0	West Bromwich Albion	Coventry
15:00 BST	Rudoni 6'; Grimes (yellow card) 11', (goal) 48'; Dasilva (yellow card) 43'; Kitching (yellow card) 53'	Report	Styles (yellow card) 28' (yellow-red card) 51'	Stadium: Coventry Building Society Arena; Attendance: 31,167; Referee: Craig Pawson

21 April 2025 44	Plymouth Argyle	3–1	Coventry City	Plymouth
15:00 BST	Bundu (yellow card) 27', (goal) 40', 65'; Hardie 43'	Report	Wright 45'; Latibeaudiere (yellow card) 84'	Stadium: Home Park; Attendance: 16,974; Referee: Andy Davies

26 April 2025 45	Luton Town	1–0	Coventry City	Luton
12:30 BST	Walsh (red card) 68'; Baptiste 90'	Report	Dasilva (red card) 13'	Stadium: Kenilworth Road; Attendance: 11,965; Referee: Oliver Langford
Note: Fixture was initially scheduled for a 15:00 kick-off, but was moved for live Sky Sports broadcasting.

3 May 2025 46	Coventry City	2–0	Middlesbrough	Coventry
12:30 BST	Rudoni 44', 87'; Sheaf (yellow card) 74' van Ewijk (yellow card) 77'; Wilson (yellow card) 84'	Report	Hackney (yellow card) 17'	Stadium: Coventry Building Society Arena; Attendance: 31,452; Referee: Stuart Attwell
Note: Fixture was initially scheduled for a 15:00 kick-off, but it was later confirmed that all final EFL Championship matchday fixtures begin earlier.

==== Play-offs ====
Coventry City finished 5th, in the regular season and were drawn against 4th place Sunderland.

9 May 2025 Semi final (1st leg)	Coventry City	1–2	Sunderland	Coventry
20:00 GMT	Sheaf (yellow card) 55'; Van Ewijk (yellow card) 59'; Kitching (yellow card) 63'; Rudoni 70'	Report	Cirkin (yellow card) 21'; Isidor 68'; Mayenda 88'	Stadium: Coventry Building Society Arena; Attendance: 31,293; Referee: John Busby

13 May 2025 Semi final (2nd leg)	Sunderland	1–1 (a.e.t.) (3–2 agg.)	Coventry City	Sunderland
20:00 GMT	Isidor (yellow card) 12'; Roberts (yellow card) 31'; Bellingham (yellow card) 68'; Le Fée (yellow card) 78'; Rigg (yellow card) 109'; Ballard 120+3', (yellow card) 120+4'	Report	Sheaf (yellow card) 24'; Thomas (yellow card) 33'; Wilson (yellow card) 68'; Mason-Clark 76'	Stadium: Stadium of Light; Attendance: 46,530; Referee: Andrew Madley

=== FA Cup ===
Coventry City entered the FA Cup in the third round, and were drawn at home to Sheffield Wednesday and then to Ipswich Town in the fourth round.

Win Draw Loss Fixtures

11 January 2025 Third round	Coventry City	1–1 (a.e.t.) (4–3 p)	Sheffield Wednesday	Coventry
18:00 GMT	Rudoni (yellow card) 6'; Kitching 26'; Allen (yellow card) 82'; Thomas (yellow card) 98'; Eccles (yellow card) 104'	Report	Kobacki (yellow card) 84'; Musaba 90+3'	Stadium: Coventry Building Society Arena; Attendance: 20,906; Referee: Thomas Kirk
	Penalties
	Torp (penalty scored); Bidwell (penalty missed); Eccles (penalty scored); Rudoni (penalty scored); Bassette (penalty scored)		(penalty scored) Windass; (penalty scored) Bannan; (penalty missed) Lowe; (penalty scored) Charles; (penalty missed) Kobacki

8 February 2025 Fourth round	Coventry City	1–4	Ipswich Town	Coventry
15:00 GMT	Latibeaudiere 8'	Report	Hirst 2' (pen.); Clarke 28', 37'; Philogene 63'	Stadium: Coventry Building Society Arena; Attendance: 30,055; Referee: Ben Toner

=== EFL Cup ===
As an EFL Championship side, Coventry entered the EFL Cup in the first round, where they were drawn away against Bristol City on 27 June. In the second round, they were drawn at home against Oxford United on 14 August. On 28 August Coventry City were drawn at home in the third round, against Tottenham Hotspur.

Win Draw Loss Fixtures

13 August 2024 First round	Bristol City	0–1	Coventry City	Bristol
19:45 BST	Naismith (yellow card) 29'; Armstrong (yellow card) 90+4'	Report	Dasilva (yellow card) 7'; Simms 65'; Palmer (yellow card) 89'	Stadium: Ashton Gate; Attendance: 10,940; Referee: James Bell

27 August 2024 Second round	Coventry City	1–0	Oxford United	Coventry
19:45 BST	Thomas-Asante 57'	Report		Stadium: Coventry Building Society Arena; Attendance: 11,808; Referee: Will Finnie

18 September 2024 Third round	Coventry City	1–2	Tottenham Hotspur	Coventry
20:00 BST	Binks (yellow card) 25'; Allen (yellow card) 57'; Thomas-Asante 63', (yellow card) 90+4'; Kitching (yellow card) 86'	Report	Spence 88'; Maddison (yellow card) 90'; Johnson 90+2'	Stadium: Coventry Building Society Arena; Attendance: 24,616; Referee: Darren England

== Transfers ==
=== Transfers in ===
Date	Pos	Nat	Name	From	Fee	Ref.
14 June 2024 (Note: The transfer was announced on 24 May, and would become official on June 14 once the transfer window re-opened)	LW	(Australia)	Raphael	(Australia) Macarthur	Undisclosed	
17 June 2024	FW	(England)	Aston Ellard (Note: Signed initially for the Under-21s)	(England) Conquest Academy	Free Transfer	
19 June 2024	CB	(England)	Luis Binks	(Italy) Bologna	Undisclosed	
20 June 2024	CM	(England)	Jack Rudoni	(England) Huddersfield Town	Undisclosed	
3 July 2024	RB	(Grenada)	Greg Sandiford	(England) Cambridge United	Free Transfer	
3 July 2024	AM	(England)	Kai Yearn	(England) Cambridge United	Free Transfer	
11 July 2024	LB	(England)	Harvey Broad	(England) Chatham Town	Undisclosed	
19 July 2024	GK	(Sweden)	Oliver Dovin	(Sweden) Hammarby IF	Undisclosed	
1 August 2024	FW	(Ghana)	Brandon Thomas-Asante	(England) West Bromwich Albion	Undisclosed	
21 August 2024	FW	(Belgium)	Norman Bassette	(France) Caen	Undisclosed	
31 January 2025	DM	(England)	Matt Grimes	(Wales) Swansea City	Undisclosed	
14 February 2025	FW	(England)	Jamie Paterson	(United States) Charlotte	Free Transfer	

=== Loans out ===
Date	Pos	Nat	Name	To	Until	Ref.
20 August 2024	RB	(Scotland)	Jack Burroughs	(Scotland) Kilmarnock	17 January 2025 (Note: On 17 January, Burroughs was recalled from his planned season-long loan at Kilmarnock)	
28 August 2024	CM	(Wales)	Ryan Howley	(Scotland) Ayr United	16 January 2025 (Note: On 16 January, Howley was recalled from his planned season-long loan at Ayr)	
30 August 2024	CF	(Trinidad and Tobago)	Justin Obikwu	(England) Grimsby Town	End of Season	
20 December 2024	CB	(England)	Kain Ryan	(England) Rushall Olympic	20 January 2025	
20 December 2024	CM	(England)	Charlie Finney	(England) Rushall Olympic	20 January 2025	
31 December 2024	CB	(Italy)	Riccardo Di Trolio	(England) Welling United	31 January 2025	
7 January 2025	FW	(Wales)	Kai Andrews	(Scotland) Motherwell	End of Season	
31 January 2025	FW	(Portugal)	Fábio Tavares	(England) Burton Albion	End of Season	
7 February 2025	GK	(England)	Luke Bell	(England) Gloucester City	7 March 2025	

=== Transfers out ===
Date	Pos.	Nat	Name	To	Fee	Ref.
15 June 2024	MF	(Romania)	Marco Rus	(Scotland) Ayr United	Undisclosed	
21 June 2024	AM	(Austria)	Evan Eghosa	(Austria) Floridsdorfer AC	Mutual Consent	
30 June 2024	DM	(Scotland)	Liam Kelly	(England) Rotherham United	Released	
30 June 2024	GK	(England)	Simon Moore	(England) Sunderland	Released	
30 June 2024	DF	(England)	Dermi Lusala	(England) Buxton	Released	
30 June 2024	FW	(England)	Bradley Stretton	(England) Oxford City	Released	
30 June 2024	AM	(England)	Callum O'Hare	(England) Sheffield United	Contract Expiry	
3 July 2024	FW	(England)	Matt Godden	(England) Charlton Athletic	Undisclosed	
30 August 2024	AM	(Jamaica)	Kasey Palmer	(England) Hull City	Undisclosed	
30 August 2024	DF	(England)	Marlow Barrett	(England) Manchester City	Compensation	

== Squad information ==
=== Squad details ===
No.	Name	Position	Nationality	Place of birth	Date of birth (age) *	Club apps *	Club goals *	Signed from	Date signed	Fee	Contract end
Goalkeepers
1	Oliver Dovin	GK	(Sweden)	London	8 July 2002 (aged 21)	0	0	Hammarby IF	19 July 2024	Undisclosed	30 June 2028
13	Ben Wilson	GK	(England)	Stanley	9 August 1992 (aged 31)	111	1	Bradford City	1 July 2019	Free Transfer	30 June 2027
40	Bradley Collins	GK	(England)	Southampton	18 February 1997 (aged 27)	31	0	Barnsley	17 July 2023	Undisclosed	30 June 2026
44	Cian Tyler	GK	(Wales) (England)	Coventry	22 March 2002 (aged 22)	0	0	Academy	10 November 2016	—N/a	30 June 2025
48	Luke Bell	GK	(England)		1 March 2004 (aged 20)	0	0	Academy	1 July 2022	—N/a	30 June 2025
Defenders
2	Luis Binks	CB	(England)	Gillingham	2 September 2001 (aged 22)	23	1	Bologna	19 June 2024	Undisclosed	30 June 2028
3	Jay Dasilva	LB	(Wales) (England)	Luton	22 April 1998 (aged 26)	42	0	Bristol City	1 July 2023	Free Transfer	30 June 2027
4	Bobby Thomas	CB	(England)	Chester	30 January 2001 (aged 23)	49	2	Burnley	22 July 2023	Undisclosed	30 June 2027
15	Liam Kitching	CB	(England)	Harrogate	25 October 1999 (aged 24)	32	1	Barnsley	1 September 2023	Undisclosed	30 June 2027
21	Jake Bidwell	LB	(England)	Southport	21 March 1993 (aged 31)	105	2	Swansea City	17 January 2022	Free Transfer	30 June 2027
22	Joel Latibeaudiere	CB	(Jamaica) (England)	Doncaster	6 January 2000 (aged 24)	48	3	Swansea City	18 July 2023	Compensation	30 June 2027
27	Milan van Ewijk	RB	(Netherlands)	Amsterdam	8 September 2000 (aged 23)	49	2	Heerenveen	27 July 2023	Undisclosed	30 June 2027
32	Jack Burroughs	RB	(Scotland) (England)	Coventry	21 March 2001 (aged 23)	20	0	Academy	7 August 2017	—N/a	30 June 2025
50	Riccardo Di Trolio	CB	(Italy) (England)	Camden	14 August 2005 (aged 18)	0	0	St Albans City	26 January 2023	Free Transfer	30 June 2025
51	Harvey Broad	LB	(England)		1 September 2005 (aged 18)	0	0	Chatham Town	11 July 2024	Undisclosed	30 June 2025
53	Greg Sandiford	RB	(Grenada)	Luton	7 May 2005 (aged 19)	0	0	Cambridge United	3 July 2024	Free Transfer	30 June 2025
Midfielders
5	Jack Rudoni	CM	(England)	Carshalton	14 June 2001 (aged 23)	0	0	Huddersfield Town	20 June 2024	Undisclosed	30 June 2028
6	Matt Grimes	CM	(England)	Exeter	15 July 1995 (aged 28)	0	0	Swansea City	31 January 2025	Undisclosed	30 June 2028
7	Tatsuhiro Sakamoto	RW	(Japan)	Tokyo	22 October 1996 (aged 27)	32	7	KV Oostende	10 July 2023	Undisclosed	30 June 2027
8	Jamie Allen	CM	(England)	Rochdale	29 January 1995 (aged 29)	147	11	Burton Albion	1 July 2019	Undisclosed	30 June 2025
10	Ephron Mason-Clark	LW	(England)	Lambeth	25 August 1999 (aged 24)	0	0	Peterborough United	1 February 2024	Undisclosed	30 June 2028
14	Ben Sheaf	DM	(England)	Dartford	5 February 1998 (aged 26)	143	9	Arsenal	1 July 2021	Undisclosed	30 June 2026
17	Raphael	LW	(Australia) (Brazil)	Maastricht	11 September 2003 (aged 20)	0	0	Macarthur	14 June 2024	Undisclosed	30 June 2028
28	Josh Eccles	CM	(England)	Coventry	6 April 2000 (aged 24)	117	2	Academy	1 July 2018	—N/a	30 June 2028
29	Victor Torp	CM	(Denmark)	Lemvig	30 July 1999 (aged 24)	20	1	Sarpsborg	11 January 2024	Undisclosed	30 June 2028
36	Ryan Howley	CM	(Wales) (England)	Nuneaton	23 November 2003 (aged 20)	8	0	Academy	1 July 2021	—N/a	30 June 2025
Forwards
9	Ellis Simms	CF	(England)	Oldham	5 January 2001 (aged 23)	53	19	Everton	7 July 2023	Undisclosed	30 June 2027
11	Haji Wright	FW	(United States)	Los Angeles	27 March 1998 (aged 26)	50	19	Antalyaspor	4 August 2023	£7,700,000	30 June 2027
12	Jamie Paterson	FW	(England)	Coventry	20 December 1991 (aged 32)	0	0	Charlotte	14 February 2025	Free Transfer	30 June 2025
23	Brandon Thomas-Asante	FW	(Ghana) (England)	Milton Keynes	29 December 1998 (aged 25)	0	0	West Bromwich Albion	1 August 2024	Undisclosed	30 June 2028
37	Norman Bassette	FW	(Belgium)	Arlon	9 November 2004 (aged 19)	0	0	Caen	21 August 2024	Undisclosed	30 June 2028
59	Aidan Dausch	FW	(England) (United States)	London	1 June 2006 (aged 18)	2	0	Academy	1 July 2023	—N/a	30 June 2025
Out on loan
30	Fábio Tavares	FW	(Portugal) (England)	Matosinhos	22 January 2001 (aged 23)	28	4	Rochdale	1 February 2021	Undisclosed	30 June 2025
49	Justin Obikwu	CF	(Trinidad and Tobago) (England)	Brent	18 February 2004 (aged 20)	0	0	Academy	1 July 2022	—N/a	30 June 2025
54	Kai Andrews	FW	(Wales) (England)	Birmingham	6 August 2006 (aged 17)	2	0	Academy	1 July 2022	—N/a	30 June 2026
Left before the end of the season
45	Kasey Palmer	AM	(Jamaica) (England)	Lewisham	9 November 1996 (aged 27)	70	8	Bristol City	1 July 2022	Free Transfer	30 June 2025

Last updated: 31 January 2025.
Source: Coventry City

* Player age and appearances/goals for the club as of beginning of 2024–25 season.

=== Appearances ===
As of match played 13 May 2025

Players with no appearances are not included on the list

Number	Nationality	Player	Position	Championship	FA Cup	EFL Cup	Championship Play-offs	Total
1	(Sweden)	Oliver Dovin	GK	28	2			30
2	(England)	Luis Binks	DF	21+1	2	1		25
3	(Wales)	Jay Dasilva	DF	20+11	2	2	2	37
4	(England)	Bobby Thomas	DF	37+1	2	3	2	45
5	(England)	Jack Rudoni	MF	40+3	2	1+2	2	50
6	(England)	Matt Grimes	MF	15+1			2	18
7	(Japan)	Tatsuhiro Sakamoto	MF	30+12	1+1	0+2	2	48
8	(England)	Jamie Allen	MF	12+9	2	2+1	0+2	28
9	(England)	Ellis Simms	FW	26+17	1	0+2		46
10	(England)	Ephron Mason-Clark	MF	17+13		1+1	1+1	34
11	(United States)	Haji Wright	FW	21+6		2	2	31
12	(England)	Jamie Paterson	FW	0+8				8
13	(England)	Ben Wilson	GK	4		3	2	9
14	(England)	Ben Sheaf	MF	23+6		0+2	2	33
15	(England)	Liam Kitching	DF	26+1	2	2	2	33
17	(Australia)	Raphael	MF	0+3	0+2			5
21	(England)	Jake Bidwell	DF	23+6	0+1	1		31
22	(Jamaica)	Joel Latibeaudiere	DF	29+4	1	2		36
23	(Ghana)	Brandon Thomas-Asante	FW	14+22	2	3	1+1	43
27	(Netherlands)	Milan van Ewijk	DF	45	1	1+2	2	51
28	(England)	Josh Eccles	MF	25+14	1+1	3	0+1	45
29	(Denmark)	Victor Torp	MF	25+11	1+1	1+2		41
30	(Portugal)	Fábio Tavares	FW	0+1		1		2
32	(Scotland)	Jack Burroughs	DF		0+1			1
37	(Belgium)	Norman Bassette	FW	11+14	0+2	2		29
40	(England)	Bradley Collins	GK	14+1				15
Players who featured but departed the club permanently during the season:
45	(Jamaica)	Kasey Palmer	MF	0+3		2		5

=== Goalscorers ===
Correct as of 13 May 2025

Number	Nationality	Player	Position	Championship	FA Cup	EFL Cup	Championship Play-offs	Total
11	(United States)	Haji Wright	FW	12	0	0	0	12
5	(England)	Jack Rudoni	MF	9	0	0	1	10
9	(England)	Ellis Simms	FW	6	0	1	0	7
10	(England)	Ephron Mason-Clark	MF	5	0	0	1	6
23	(Ghana)	Brandon Thomas-Asante	FW	4	0	2	0	6
29	(Denmark)	Victor Torp	MF	6	0	0	0	6
4	(England)	Bobby Thomas	DF	5	0	0	0	5
7	(Japan)	Tatsuhiro Sakamoto	MF	4	0	0	0	4
28	(England)	Josh Eccles	MF	3	0	0	0	3
6	(England)	Matt Grimes	MF	2	0	0	0	2
27	(Netherlands)	Milan van Ewijk	DF	2	0	0	0	2
37	(Belgium)	Norman Bassette	FW	2	0	0	0	2
12	(England)	Jamie Paterson	FW	1	0	0	0	1
15	(England)	Liam Kitching	DF	0	1	0	0	1
21	(England)	Jake Bidwell	DF	1	0	0	0	1
22	(Jamaica)	Joel Latibeaudiere	DF	0	1	0	0	1
45	(Jamaica)	Kasey Palmer	MF	1	0	0	0	1
Own Goals				1	0	0	0	1
Totals				64	2	3	2	71

=== Yellow cards ===
Correct as of 13 May 2025

Number	Nationality	Player	Position	Championship	FA Cup	EFL Cup	Championship Play-offs	Total
15	(England)	Liam Kitching	DF	7	0	1	1	9
28	(England)	Josh Eccles	MF	8	1	0	0	9
2	(England)	Luis Binks	DF	7	0	1	0	8
14	(England)	Ben Sheaf	MF	6	0	0	2	8
4	(England)	Bobby Thomas	DF	4	1	0	1	6
21	(England)	Jake Bidwell	DF	5	0	0	0	5
22	(Jamaica)	Joel Latibeaudiere	DF	5	0	0	0	5
37	(Belgium)	Norman Bassette	FW	5	0	0	0	5
5	(England)	Jack Rudoni	MF	3	1	0	0	4
6	(England)	Matt Grimes	FW	4	0	0	0	4
7	(Japan)	Tatsuhiro Sakamoto	MF	4	0	0	0	4
23	(Ghana)	Brandon Thomas-Asante	FW	3	0	1	0	4
3	(Wales)	Jay Dasilva	DF	2	0	1	0	3
8	(England)	Jamie Allen	MF	1	1	1	0	3
27	(Netherlands)	Milan van Ewijk	DF	2	0	0	1	3
10	(England)	Ephron Mason-Clark	MF	2	0	0	0	2
13	(England)	Ben Wilson	GK	1	0	0	1	2
29	(Denmark)	Victor Torp	MF	2	0	0	0	2
40	(England)	Bradley Collins	GK	2	0	0	0	2
1	(Sweden)	Oliver Dovin	GK	1	0	0	0	1
9	(England)	Ellis Simms	FW	1	0	0	0	1
11	(United States)	Haji Wright	FW	1	0	0	0	1
12	(England)	Jamie Paterson	FW	1	0	0	0	1
45	(Jamaica)	Kasey Palmer	MF	0	0	1	0	1
Totals				76	4	6	6	92

=== Red cards ===
Correct as of 26 April 2025

Number	Nationality	Player	Position	Championship	FA Cup	EFL Cup	Championship Play-offs	Total
3	(Wales)	Jay Dasilva	DF	1	0	0	0	1
Totals				1	0	0	0	1

=== Captains ===
Correct as of 13 May 2025

Number	Nationality	Player	Position	Championship	FA Cup	EFL Cup	Championship Play-offs	Total
14	(England)	Ben Sheaf	MF	23	0	0	2	25
8	(England)	Jamie Allen	MF	9	2	0	0	11
22	(Jamaica)	Joel Latibeaudiere	DF	6	0	2	0	8
15	(England)	Liam Kitching	DF	4	0	0	0	4
21	(England)	Jake Bidwell	DF	3	0	0	0	3
28	(England)	Josh Eccles	MF	1	0	1	0	2
Totals				46	2	3	2	53

=== Penalties awarded ===
Number	Nationality	Player	Position	Date	Opponents	Ground	Success
29	(Denmark)	Victor Torp	MF	30 November 2024	Cardiff City	Coventry Building Society Arena	✓
29	(Denmark)	Victor Torp	MF	14 December 2024	Hull City	Coventry Building Society Arena	✗
9	(England)	Ellis Simms	FW	1 March 2025	Oxford United	Kassam Stadium	✗
11	(United States)	Haji Wright	FW	15 March 2025	Sunderland	Coventry Building Society Arena	✓

=== Hat-tricks ===
Number	Nationality	Player	Position	Date	Opponents	Ground	Result
11	(United States)	Haji Wright	FW	15 March 2025	Sunderland	Coventry Building Society Arena	3–0

=== Suspensions served ===
Number	Nationality	Player	Position	Date suspended	Reason	Matches missed
15	(England)	Liam Kitching	DF	27 April 2024	1 red card	Stoke City (A)
28	(England)	Josh Eccles	MF	6 November 2024	5 yellow cards	Sunderland (A)
3	(Wales)	Jay Dasilva	DF	26 April 2025	1 red card	Middlesbrough (H)

=== Monthly & weekly awards ===
Number	Nationality	Player	Position	Date	Award	Ref
11	(United States)	Haji Wright	FW	19 August 2024	EFL Championship Team of the Week	
5	(England)	Jack Rudoni	MF	16 September 2024	EFL Championship Team of the Week	
11	(United States)	Haji Wright	FW	3 October 2024	EFL Championship Team of the Week	
21	(England)	Jake Bidwell	DF	3 October 2024	EFL Championship Team of the Week	
11	(United States)	Haji Wright	FW	28 October 2024	EFL Championship Team of the Week	
4	(England)	Bobby Thomas	DF	4 November 2024	EFL Championship Team of the Week	
11	(United States)	Haji Wright	FW	4 November 2024	EFL Championship Team of the Week	
11	(United States)	Haji Wright	FW	11 November 2024	EFL Championship Team of the Week	
4	(England)	Bobby Thomas	DF	9 December 2024	EFL Championship Team of the Week	
5	(England)	Jack Rudoni	MF	9 December 2024	EFL Championship Team of the Week	
5	(England)	Jack Rudoni	MF	16 December 2024	EFL Championship Team of the Week	
10	(England)	Ephron Mason-Clark	MF	16 December 2024	EFL Championship Team of the Week	
22	(Jamaica)	Joel Latibeaudiere	DF	27 December 2024	EFL Championship Team of the Week	
28	(England)	Josh Eccles	MF	27 December 2024	EFL Championship Team of the Week	
10	(England)	Ephron Mason-Clark	MF	10 January 2025	EFL Championship Player of the Month	
1	(Sweden)	Oliver Dovin	GK	23 January 2025	EFL Championship Team of the Week	
29	(Denmark)	Victor Torp	MF	28 January 2025	EFL Championship Team of the Week	
23	(Ghana)	Brandon Thomas-Asante	FW	4 February 2025	EFL Championship Team of the Week	
1	(Sweden)	Oliver Dovin	GK	13 February 2025	EFL Championship Team of the Week	
4	(England)	Bobby Thomas	DF	13 February 2025	EFL Championship Team of the Week	
4	(England)	Bobby Thomas	DF	25 February 2025	EFL Championship Team of the Week	
7	(Japan)	Tatsuhiro Sakamoto	MF	3 March 2025	EFL Championship Team of the Week	
10	(England)	Ephron Mason-Clark	MF	3 March 2025	EFL Championship Team of the Week	
29	(Denmark)	Victor Torp	MF	11 March 2025	EFL Championship Team of the Week	
11	(United States)	Haji Wright	FW	17 March 2025	EFL Championship Team of the Week	
29	(Denmark)	Victor Torp	MF	17 March 2025	EFL Championship Team of the Week	
6	(England)	Matt Grimes	MF	15 April 2025	EFL Championship Team of the Week	
4	(England)	Bobby Thomas	DF	4 May 2025	EFL Championship Team of the Week	
5	(England)	Jack Rudoni	MF	4 May 2025	EFL Championship Team of the Week	
13	(England)	Ben Wilson	GK	4 May 2025	EFL Championship Team of the Week	

=== End-of-season awards ===
Number	Nationality	Player	Position	Date	Award	Ref
5	(England)	Jack Rudoni	MF	3 May 2025	CCFPA Player of the Season Award	
	(England)	David Busst		3 May 2025	PFA Lifetime Achievement Award	
11	(United States)	Haji Wright	FW	13 May 2025	CCFC Top Goalscorer	
13	(England)	Ben Wilson	GK	2 June 2025	PFA Player in the Community Award	
5	(England)	Jack Rudoni	MF	8 July 2025	CCFC Player of the Season	
		Not announced			CCFC Players' Player of the Season	
		Not announced			CCFC Young Player of the Season	
		Not announced			CCFC Community Player of the Season	
		Not announced			CCFC Michelle Ridley Award	
		Not announced			CCFC JSB Player of the Season	
		Not announced			CCFC Goal of the Season	
		Not announced			CCFC Match of the Season	
