= 2023–24 Coventry City F.C. season =

140th season in existence of Coventry City FC

Coventry City
2023–24 season
- Owner: Doug King
- Executive chairman: Doug King
- Manager: Mark Robins
- Stadium: CBS Arena
- Championship: 9th
- FA Cup: Semi-finals
- EFL Cup: First round
- Top goalscorer: League: Haji Wright (16); All: Ellis Simms; Haji Wright (19 each)
- Biggest win: 5–0 Maidstone United (H) 26 February 2024, FA Cup
- Biggest defeat: 0–2 Rotherham United (A) 25 October 2023, Championship
Home colours	Away colours	Third colours

The 2023–24 season was the 140th season in the history of Coventry City and their fourth consecutive season in the Championship. The club participated in the Championship, the FA Cup, and the EFL Cup.

== Pre-season and friendlies ==
On 1 June, Coventry City announced their first pre-season friendly, against Exeter City. A day later, a second pre-season trip was confirmed, to Milton Keynes Dons. A third friendly was also added to the schedule, against Forest Green Rovers. A week later, a fourth fixture was confirmed, against Shrewsbury Town.

Win Draw Loss Fixtures

18 July 2023 Friendly	Forest Green Rovers	0–4	Coventry City	Nailsworth
19:00 BST		Report	Simms 6', 30'; Palmer 7'; Obikwu 46'	Stadium: New Lawn Stadium

22 July 2023 Friendly	Shrewsbury Town	1–1	Coventry City	Shrewsbury
15:00 BST	Bowman 12'	Report	Palmer 32'	Stadium: Montgomery Waters Meadow

25 July 2023 Friendly	Milton Keynes Dons	1–5	Coventry City	Denbigh
19:00 BST	Leko 1' (pen.)	Report	Simms 42', 43'; Eccles 60'; Palmer 72'; Stretton 90'	Stadium: Stadium MK

29 July 2023 Friendly	Exeter City	1–2	Coventry City	Exeter
15:00 BST	Harper 81'	Report	Godden 67'; Sheaf 90+3'	Stadium: St James Park

== Competitions ==
=== Overall record ===
Competition	Starting round	Final position	Record							
Competition	Starting round	Final position	Pld	W	D	L	GF	GA	GD	Win %
Championship	Matchday 1	9th	42	17	12	13	66	52	+14	40.48
FA Cup	Third round	Semi Final	6	4	1	1	22	9	+13	66.67
EFL Cup	First round	First round	1	0	0	1	1	2	−1	0.00
Total			49	21	13	15	89	63	+26	42.86

Last updated: 21 April 2023
Source: Soccerway

=== Championship ===
==== League table ====
Pos	Team	Pld	W	D	L	GF	GA	GD	Pts	Promotion, qualification or relegation
6	Norwich City	46	21	10	15	79	64	+15	73	Qualified for the Championship play-offs
7	Hull City	46	19	13	14	68	60	+8	70	
8	Middlesbrough	46	20	9	17	71	62	+9	69	
9	Coventry City	46	17	13	16	70	59	+11	64	
10	Preston North End	46	18	9	19	56	67	−11	63	
11	Bristol City	46	17	11	18	53	51	+2	62	
12	Cardiff City	46	19	5	22	53	70	−17	62	

Source: EFL official website
Rules for classification: 1) Points; 2) Goal difference; 3) Number of goals scored; 4) Head-to-head results; 5) Wins; 6) Away goals; 7) Penalty points (sec 9.5); 8) Number of 12-point sending off offences; 9) Play-off (only if needed to determine promotion/relegation)

==== Results summary ====
Overall								Home						Away					
Pld	W	D	L	GF	GA	GD	Pts	W	D	L	GF	GA	GD	W	D	L	GF	GA	GD
46	17	13	16	70	59	+11	64	9	8	6	36	27	+9	8	5	10	34	32	+2

Last updated: 4 May 2024.
Source: Soccerway

==== Results by round ====
Round	1	2	3	4	5	6	7	8	9	10	11	12	13	14	15	16	17	18	19	20	21	22	23	24	25	26	27	28	29	30	31	32	33	34	35	36	37	39	40	41	42	43	38^{1}	45	44^{2}	46
Ground	A	H	A	H	H	A	A	H	A	H	H	A	A	H	A	H	A	H	A	H	H	A	A	H	H	A	H	A	H	A	H	A	A	H	A	H	A	A	H	H	A	A	H	A	H	H
Result	L	W	D	D	D	D	L	D	W	W	D	L	L	L	L	D	W	W	L	W	D	D	W	W	D	W	W	W	D	L	W	D	W	L	L	W	W	W	L	W	L	L	L	D	L	L
Position	16	11	10	12	14	15	17	18	14	13	13	16	20	20	20	20	20	15	17	15	14	15	15	13	12	8	6	6	6	7	6	6	7	9	9	8	8	7	7	7	7	8	9	9	9	9

Updated to match(es) played on 4 May 2024. Source: Soccerway
A = Away; H = Home; W = Win; D = Draw; L = Loss; P = Postponed
Notes:
- ^{1} Matchday 38 (vs Hull City) was postponed due to FA Cup involvements.
- ^{2} Matchday 44 (vs Ipswich Town) was postponed due to FA Cup involvements.

==== Matches ====
The League fixtures were announced on 22 June 2023. Coventry's first fixture was an away fixture at King Power Stadium for a Sky Sports televised game against newly relegated Leicester

Win Draw Loss Fixtures

6 August 2023 1	Leicester City	2–1	Coventry City	Leicester
12:00 BST	Vestergaard (yellow card) 52'; Doyle (yellow card) 68'; Dewsbury-Hall 77', 87'; Winks (yellow card) 90+2'	Report	McFadzean 47'; Sheaf (yellow card) 89'; Palmer (yellow card) 90'	Stadium: King Power Stadium; Attendance: 31,763; Referee: Darren Bond
Note: Live on Sky Sports

12 August 2023 2	Coventry City	3–0	Middlesbrough	Coventry
12:30 BST	Godden 11'; Latibeaudiere (yellow card) 47'; Wright 70'; Lenihan 90+1' (o.g.)	Report	Hackney (yellow card) 81'	Stadium: Coventry Building Society Arena; Attendance: 24,080; Referee: Dean Whitestone
Note: Live on Sky Sports

19 August 2023 3	Swansea City	1–1	Coventry City	Swansea
15:00 BST	Yates 41'; Allen (yellow card) 88'; Grimes (yellow card) 90+3'	Report	Godden 39'; Latibeaudiere (yellow card) 58'	Stadium: Swansea.com Stadium; Attendance: 16,736; Referee: Bobby Madley

26 August 2023 4	Coventry City	0–0	Sunderland	Coventry
15:00 BST	Palmer (yellow card) 21'	Report	Ekwah (yellow card) 10'; O'Nien (yellow card) 14'; Cirkin (yellow card) 65'; Pritchard (yellow card) 90+5'	Stadium: Coventry Building Society Arena; Attendance: 25,714; Referee: Keith Stroud

2 September 2023 5	Coventry City	3–3	Watford	Coventry
15:00 BST	Godden (penalty missed) 20' 87'; Eccles (yellow card) 24'; van Ewijk 41'; McFadzean (yellow card) 60'; Hoedt 64' (o.g.); Sheaf (yellow card) 76'	Report	Porteous (yellow card) 30'; Rajović 35', 79'; Sierralta (yellow card) 40'; Martins 52'; Hoedt (yellow card) 90+4'	Stadium: Coventry Building Society Arena; Attendance: 24,539; Referee: David Webb

15 September 2023 6	Hull City	1–1	Coventry City	Kingston upon Hull
19:45 BST	Connolly 87', (yellow card) 90'; Delap (yellow card) 90+2'	Report	Latibeaudiere 27', (yellow card) 89'; McFadzean (yellow card) 81'; Bidwell (yellow card) 83'; Eccles (yellow card) 85'; Binks (yellow card) 90'	Stadium: MKM Stadium; Attendance: 21,888; Referee: Tony Harrington

19 September 2023 7	Cardiff City	3–2	Coventry City	Cardiff
19:45 BST	Goutas 9'; Grant 62'; Collins (yellow card) 66'; Etete 85'	Report	Godden 35', 90+6', (yellow card) 82'; Latibeaudiere (yellow card) 90'; McFadzean (yellow card) 90+9'	Stadium: Cardiff City Stadium; Attendance: 18,297; Referee: Samuel Allison

25 September 2023 8	Coventry City	1–1	Huddersfield Town	Coventry
20:00 BST	Ayari 27'; Dasilva (yellow card) 41'; Binks (yellow card) 82'	Report	Koroma (yellow card) 66'; Helik (yellow card) 79', (goal) 90+5'; Rudoni (yellow card) 85'	Stadium: Coventry Building Society Arena; Attendance: 22,257; Referee: Oliver Langford

30 September 2023 9	Queens Park Rangers	1–3	Coventry City	London
15:00 BST	Smyth (yellow card) 53'; Armstrong (yellow card) 63'; Cook (yellow card) 65'; Dozzell (yellow card) 77'; Paal 90'	Report	Dasilva (yellow card) 51'; Simms 56', 68'; Eccles 60'; Allen (yellow card) 75'	Stadium: Loftus Road; Attendance: 16,293; Referee: Tom Nield

4 October 2023 10	Coventry City	1–0	Blackburn Rovers	Coventry
19:45 BST	Binks (yellow card) 60'; Eccles (yellow card) 67'; Wright 85'	Report	Hill (yellow card) 66'	Stadium: Coventry Building Society Arena; Attendance: 22,370; Referee: Jeremy Simpson

7 October 2023 11	Coventry City	1–1	Norwich City	Coventry
15:00 BST	Gibson 88' (o.g.); Ayari (yellow card) 90+1'	Report	Rowe 41', (yellow card) 74'	Stadium: Coventry Building Society Arena; Attendance: 26,548; Referee: Dean Whitestone

21 October 2023 12	Bristol City	1–0	Coventry City	Bristol
15:00 BST	Dickie 45'; Weimann (yellow card) 55'; Yeboah (yellow card) 90+5'	Report	Eccles (yellow card) 75'; Ayari (yellow card) 81'; Dasilva (yellow card) 89'	Stadium: Ashton Gate; Attendance: 22,718; Referee: David Webb

25 October 2023 13	Rotherham United	2–0	Coventry City	Rotherham
19:45 BST	Peltier 51'; Cafú (yellow card) 60'; Lembikisa (yellow card) 66'; Rathbone 90+4'	Report	Thomas (yellow card) 90+2'	Stadium: New York Stadium; Attendance: 10,553; Referee: Lewis Smith

30 October 2023 14	Coventry City	0–2	West Bromwich Albion	Coventry
20:00 GMT	van Ewijk (yellow card) 55'; Kitching (yellow card) 73'	Report	Diangana 17'; Chalobah (yellow card) 37'; Kipré (yellow card) 45'; Bartley (yellow card) 68'; Thomas-Asante 69'; Yokuşlu (yellow card) 73'; Pieters (yellow card) 75'; Phillips (yellow card) 90+2'	Stadium: Coventry Building Society Arena; Attendance: 23,971; Referee: Peter Bankes

4 November 2023 15	Preston North End	3–2	Coventry City	Preston
15:00 GMT	Holmes 38'; Browne 41' (pen.); Frøkjær-Jensen (yellow card) 46'; Osmajić 71'; Brady (yellow card) 90+4'	Report	Wright 34', 83'; McFadzean (yellow card) 40'; Bidwell (yellow card) 90+8'	Stadium: Deepdale; Attendance: 16,716; Referee: Anthony Taylor

11 November 2023 16	Coventry City	0–0	Stoke City	Coventry
15:00 GMT	Kitching (yellow card) 79'	Report	Léris (yellow card) 61'	Stadium: Coventry Building Society Arena; Attendance: 25,003; Referee: Anthony Backhouse

25 November 2023 17	Millwall	0–3	Coventry City	London
15:00 GMT	Saville (yellow card) 22'; Wallace (yellow card) 76'	Report	Godden 30'; Sakamoto 66'; Thomas (yellow card) 86'; Sheaf 88'	Stadium: The Den; Attendance: 18,067; Referee: Darren England

28 November 2023 18	Coventry City	1–0	Plymouth Argyle	Coventry
19:45 GMT	Wright 75'; Bidwell (yellow card) 90+3'	Report	Houghton (yellow card) 75'; Cooper (yellow card) 76'; Gibson (yellow card) 81'	Stadium: Coventry Building Society Arena; Attendance: 22,790; Referee: Andy Davies

2 December 2023 19	Ipswich Town	2–1	Coventry City	Ipswich
15:00 GMT	Hirst 6'; Luongo (yellow card) 39'; Burns 41'; Williams (yellow card) 89'	Report	Godden (penalty missed) 72'; Sakamoto (yellow card) 79'; Williams 90+6' (o.g.)	Stadium: Portman Road; Attendance: 29,378; Referee: Andrew Kitchen

8 December 2023 20	Coventry City	2–0	Birmingham City	Coventry
20:00 GMT	O'Hare 30', 77'	Report	Bacuna (yellow card) 9'; Dembélé (yellow card) 56'; Aiwu (yellow card) 70'; Jutkiewicz (yellow card) 75'	Stadium: Coventry Building Society Arena; Attendance: 26,729; Referee: Samuel Allison

13 December 2023 21	Coventry City	1–1	Southampton	Coventry
19:45 GMT	Wright 50'	Report	Walker-Peters (yellow card) 37'; Edozie 67'; Bednarek (yellow card) 70'; Aribo (yellow card) 90+5'	Stadium: The Coventry Building Society Arena; Attendance: 23,996; Referee: Ben Toner

16 December 2023 22	Leeds United	1–1	Coventry City	Leeds
15:00 GMT	Summerville (yellow card) 50', (goal) 58'; Meslier (yellow card) 66'; Ampadu (yellow card) 75'	Report	Thomas 66'; Simms (yellow card) 66'; Collins (yellow card) 82'; Eccles (yellow card) 88'; Palmer (yellow card) 88'; Sheaf (yellow card) 90+7'	Stadium: Elland Road; Attendance: 36,700; Referee: Geoff Eltringham

23 December 2023 23	Sunderland	0–3	Coventry City	Sunderland
15:00 GMT	Hume (yellow card) 26'; O'Nien (yellow card) 45+4'; Neil (yellow card) 88'	Report	Sakamoto 45+1'; Collins (yellow card) 54'; Bidwell (yellow card) 64'; O'Hare 67'; Palmer 70'	Stadium: The Stadium of Light; Attendance: 41,216; Referee: Matt Donohue

26 December 2023 24	Coventry City	2–0	Sheffield Wednesday	Coventry
15:00 GMT	Sakamoto 20', 89'; Latibeaudiere (yellow card) 55'; Kitching (red card) 90+6'	Report	Famewo (yellow card) 70'; Diaby (red card) 90+6'	Stadium: The Coventry Building Society Arena; Attendance: 29,208; Referee: Oliver Langford

29 December 2023 25	Coventry City	2–2	Swansea City	Coventry
19:45 GMT	Wright 10'; Binks (yellow card) 26'; Simms 65'	Report	Walsh 7', (yellow card) 36'; Grimes (yellow card) 39'; Tymon (yellow card) 68'; Lowe (yellow card) 79'; Cullen 90+3'	Stadium: The Coventry Building Society Arena; Attendance: 25,807; Referee: Thomas Kirk

1 January 2024 26	Middlesbrough	1–3	Coventry City	Middlesbrough
15:00 GMT	Coburn 31'; Greenwood (yellow card) 67'; Rogers (yellow card) 90+1'	Report	Sakamoto 34', 69'; Wright 58', (yellow card) 82'; Eccles (yellow card) 65'	Stadium: Riverside Stadium; Attendance: 28,409; Referee: David Webb

13 January 2024 27	Coventry City	3–1	Leicester City	Coventry
12:30 GMT	Palmer (yellow card) 37'; Thomas (yellow card) 43'; Sakamoto (yellow card) 43'; O'Hare 78', 90+4'; Van Ewijk 88', (yellow card) 90+4'; Dasilva (yellow card) 90+3'	Report	Dewsbury-Hall 44' (pen.); Fatawu (red card) 47'; Winks (yellow card) 78'; Cannon (yellow card) 83'; Casadei (yellow card) 84'	Stadium: The Coventry Building Society Arena; Attendance: 29,914; Referee: Darren England
Note: Fixture was originally due to kick off at 15:00, but was brought forward due to TV coverage.

20 January 2024 28	Sheffield Wednesday	1–2	Coventry City	Sheffield
15:00 GMT	Ihiekwe (yellow card) 14'; Gassama (yellow card) 36'; Windass 68'; Bannan (yellow card) 87'; Johnson (yellow card) 89'	Report	Sheaf 40', 57', (yellow card) 43'; Sakamoto (yellow card) 53' van Ewijk (yellow card) 59'; Godden (yellow card) 66'; Palmer (yellow card) 84'	Stadium: Hillsborough Stadium; Attendance: 28,129; Referee: Anthony Backhouse

30 January 2024 29	Coventry City	2–2	Bristol City	Coventry
19:45 GMT	Sakamoto 27'; Simms 86' van Ewijk (yellow card) 90+1'	Report	Dickie 45+1'; Wells 83'; Pring (yellow card) 85'; McCrorie (yellow card) 90+3'	Stadium: The Coventry Building Society Arena; Attendance: 22,724; Referee: Leigh Doughty
Note: Fixture was originally scheduled for 27 January, but was postponed due to FA Cup involvement.

3 February 2024 30	Norwich City	2–1	Coventry City	Norwich
15:00 GMT	Núñez (yellow card) 22'; McLean (yellow card) 45'; Sargent 60'; Sainz 84'	Report	Kitching (yellow card) 36' (yellow-red card) 71'; O'Hare 48'; Thomas (yellow card) 90+7'	Stadium: Carrow Road; Attendance: 26,306; Referee: Gavin Ward

11 February 2024 31	Coventry City	2–1	Millwall	Coventry
12:00 GMT	Wright 67' (pen.), 70'	Report	Esse 12' (yellow card) 23'	Stadium: The Coventry Building Society Arena; Referee: Andrew Kitchen
Note: Fixture was originally scheduled for 10 February, but was moved to a day later for live Sky Sports coverage.

14 February 2024 32	Plymouth Argyle	2–2	Coventry City	Plymouth
19:45 GMT	Randell (yellow card) 18'; Whittaker 55'; Miller 68'	Report	Simms (yellow card) 63', (goal) 66'; Latibeaudiere (yellow card) 75'; Thomas (yellow card) 85'; Kitching 90+6'	Stadium: Home Park; Attendance: 16,799; Referee: Keith Stroud

17 February 2024 33	Stoke City	0–1	Coventry City	Stoke-on-Trent
15:00 GMT	Thompson (yellow card) 8'; Baker (yellow card) 45'	Report	Simms 51'; O'Hare (yellow card) 86'	Stadium: bet365 Stadium; Attendance: 22,866; Referee: James Bell

23 February 2024 34	Coventry City	0–3	Preston North End	Coventry
19:45 GMT	Thomas (yellow card) 71'	Report	Jakobsen 1'; Keane 20'; Thomas 36' (o.g.); Whiteman (yellow card) 43'; Storey (yellow card) 54'; Woodburn (yellow card) 90'	Stadium: The Coventry Building Society Arena; Attendance: 24,500; Referee: Andy Davies
Note: Fixture was originally scheduled for 24 February, but was moved due to FA Cup progression.

1 March 2024 35	West Bromwich Albion	2–1	Coventry City	West Bromwich
20:00 GMT	Johnston 6'; Townsend (yellow card) 21'; Diangana 36'; Reach (yellow card) 90+2'	Report	Palmer (yellow card) 49'; Wright 73' (pen.)	Stadium: The Hawthorns; Referee: Lewis Smith
Note: Fixture was originally scheduled for 2 March, but was moved to a day earlier for live Sky Sports coverage.

5 March 2024 36	Coventry City	5–0	Rotherham United	Coventry
19:45 GMT	Simms 5', 27', 37'; Latibeaudiere 23'; Tavares 90+1'	Report	Hugill (yellow card) 54'	Stadium: The Coventry Building Society Arena; Attendance: 22,092; Referee: John Busby

9 March 2024 37	Watford	1–2	Coventry City	Watford
15:00 GMT	Porteous 20'; Hoedt (yellow card) 26'	Report	Kelly (yellow card) 19'; Palmer (yellow card) 23'; Wright 40' (pen.), 72', (yellow card) 88'; Bidwell (yellow card) 45+1'; Thomas (yellow card) 66'	Stadium: Vicarage Road; Attendance: 18,907; Referee: Bobby Madley

29 March 2024 39	Huddersfield Town	1–3	Coventry City	Huddersfield
15:00 GMT	Balker (yellow card) 14'; Healey 79'	Report	Kitching (yellow card) 3'; Simms 16', 22'; Sheaf (yellow card) 45'; Thomas (yellow card) 87'; Wright 90+4'	Stadium: Kirklees Stadium; Attendance: 20,530; Referee: Adam Herczeg

1 April 2024 40	Coventry City	1–2	Cardiff City	Coventry
15:00 BST	Simms 22'; Wright (yellow card) 65'	Report	Kitching 29', 67' (o.g.); Turnbull (yellow card) 35'	Stadium: Coventry Building Society Arena; Attendance: 28,529; Referee: Leigh Doughty

6 April 2024 41	Coventry City	2–1	Leeds United	Coventry
15:00 BST	Simms 9' (yellow card) 88'; Wright 49'; Bidwell (yellow card) 62'; Sheaf (yellow card) 71'; Eccles (yellow card) 90+2'	Report	Gruev (yellow card) 8'; Piroe 76'; Ampadu (yellow card) 88'	Stadium: Coventry Building Society Arena; Attendance: 30,232; Referee: Tom Nield

9 April 2024 42	Southampton	2–1	Coventry City	Southampton
19:45 BST	Walker-Peters 18'; Adams 38'; Downes (yellow card) 42'	Report	Latibeaudiere (yellow card) 3'; Eccles (yellow card) 40'; Bidwell 68'	Stadium: St Mary's Stadium; Attendance: 28,564; Referee: James Linington

13 April 2024 43	Birmingham City	3–0	Coventry City	Birmingham
15:00 BST	Thomas 12' (o.g.); Šunjić 41' (yellow card) 18'; Stansfield 59' (yellow card) 54'; Miyoshi (yellow card) 79'	Report	Latibeaudiere (yellow card) 54'; Eccles (yellow card) 72'	Stadium: St Andrew's; Attendance: 26,811; Referee: Thomas Bramall

24 April 2024 38	Coventry City	2–3	Hull City	Coventry
19:45 BST	Palmer 36'; Thomas 58'; Eccles (yellow card) 45+2'; Sheaf (yellow card) 45+2'	Report	Philogene 31' (yellow card) 45+3'; Carvalho 45+1' (pen.) (yellow card) 45+3'; Ohio 78'; Morton (yellow card) 42'; Jones (yellow card) 68'	Stadium: The Coventry Building Society Arena; Attendance: 25,023; Referee: Leigh Doughty
Note: Fixture was originally scheduled for 16 March, but was postponed due to FA Cup involvements.

27 April 2024 45	Blackburn Rovers	0–0	Coventry City	Blackburn
15:00 BST		Report	Kitching (red card) 62'; Palmer (yellow card) 50'	Stadium: Ewood Park; Attendance: 20,026; Referee: Anthony Backhouse

30 April 2024 44	Coventry City	1–2	Ipswich Town	Coventry
20:00 BST	Wright 64'; O'Hare (yellow card) 90+13'	Report	Moore 8'; Burgess 69'; Morsy (yellow card) 75'	Stadium: Coventry Building Society Arena; Attendance: 26,457; Referee: James Bell
Note: Fixture was initially scheduled for 20 April, but was postponed due to FA Cup involvements.

4 May 2024 46	Coventry City	1–2	Queens Park Rangers	Coventry
12:30 BST	Allen 83'; Thomas (yellow card) 40'; Eccles (yellow card) 73'	Report	Chair 33'; Fox 40'; Dykes (yellow card) 22'; Paal (yellow card) 70'	Stadium: Coventry Building Society Arena; Attendance: 29,102; Referee: Josh Smith

=== FA Cup ===
As a Championship side, Coventry entered in the third round and were drawn at home against Oxford United. In the fourth round, they were drawn away to Sheffield Wednesday. In the fifth round, they were drawn at home against Maidstone United. A trip to Wolverhampton Wanderers was confirmed in the quarter-finals. Coventry were knocked out of the competition at Wembley to eventual winner Manchester United in the semifinal losing on a penalty shootout following 3–3 draw after extra-time having fought back after United had taken a three-goal lead inside 58 minutes.

Win Draw Loss Fixtures

6 January 2024 Third round	Coventry City	6–2	Oxford United	Coventry
12:30 GMT	Latibeaudiere 8'; Sheaf 11', (yellow card) 90+1'; Palmer 17'; O'Hare 50' (pen.); Godden 84', 88'	Report	Harris 10'; Brannagan (yellow card) 15'; Rodrigues (yellow card) 30'; McEachran (yellow card) 32'; Goodrham 79'	Stadium: Coventry Building Society Arena; Attendance: 18,211; Referee: Josh Smith

26 January 2024 Fourth round	Sheffield Wednesday	1–1	Coventry City	Sheffield
19:45 GMT	Famewo (yellow card) 52'; Bernard (yellow card) 78'; Gassama 84'	Report	Torp 45'; Palmer (yellow card) 47'; Dasilva (yellow card) 64'; Kitching (yellow card) 79'	Stadium: Hillsborough Stadium; Attendance: 14,215; Referee: Darren Bond

6 February 2024 Fourth round Replay	Coventry City	4–1	Sheffield Wednesday	Coventry
19:45 GMT	Palmer 3'; O'Hare 50', 56'; Wright 57'	Report	Cadamarteri 10'; Siqueira (yellow card) 19'; Wilks (yellow card) 45'; Diaby (yellow card) 53'; Fletcher (yellow card) 90+2'	Stadium: Coventry Building Society Arena; Attendance: 19,359; Referee: Chris Kavanagh

26 February 2024 Fifth round	Coventry City	5–0	Maidstone United	Coventry
19:45 GMT	Simms 9', 14', 35'; Tavares 88', 90+1'	Report		Stadium: Coventry Building Society Arena; Attendance: 26,857; Referee: Michael Salisbury

16 March 2024 Quarter-finals	Wolverhampton Wanderers	2–3	Coventry City	Wolverhampton
12:15 GMT	Aït-Nouri (yellow card) 7', (goal) 83'; Sarabia (yellow card) 81'; H. Bueno 88'	Report	Simms 53', 90+7'; Wright 90+10'; Palmer (yellow card) 90+11'	Stadium: Molineux Stadium; Attendance: 31,262; Referee: Sam Barrott

21 April 2024 Semi-finals	Coventry City	3–3 (a.e.t.) (2–4 p)	Manchester United	Wembley
15:30 BST	Simms 71'; O'Hare 79'; Thomas (yellow card) 82'; Wright 90+5' (pen.); Dasilva (yellow card) 111'; Collins (yellow card) PSO	Report	McTominay 23'; Maguire 45+1'; Fernandes 58'; Onana (yellow card) 85' (yellow card) PSO	Stadium: Wembley Stadium; Attendance: 86,372; Referee: Robert Jones
	Penalties
	Wright (penalty scored); Torp (penalty scored); O'Hare (penalty missed); Sheaf (penalty missed)		(penalty missed) Casemiro; (penalty scored) Dalot; (penalty scored) Eriksen; (penalty scored) Fernandes; (penalty scored) Højlund

=== EFL Cup ===
Coventry were drawn away to AFC Wimbledon in the first round.

Win Draw Loss Fixtures

9 August 2023 First round	AFC Wimbledon	2–1	Coventry City	London
19:45 BST	Bugiel 86'; McLean 90+2'; Lewis (yellow card) 17'; Tilley (yellow card) 28'; Ball (yellow card) 61'	Report	Godden 17' (pen.); Howley (yellow card) 45+3'	Stadium: Cherry Red Records Stadium; Attendance: 4,781; Referee: Andrew Kitchen

== Squad information ==
=== Squad details ===
As of 16 May 2024

No.	Name	Position	Nationality	Place of birth	Date of birth (age) *	Club apps *	Club goals *	Signed from	Date signed	Fee	Contract end
Goalkeepers
1	Simon Moore	GK	(England)	Sandown	19 May 1990 (aged 33)	46	0	Sheffield United	3 July 2021	Free Transfer	30 June 2024
13	Ben Wilson	GK	(England)	Stanley	9 August 1992 (aged 30)	93	1	Bradford City	1 July 2019	Free Transfer	30 June 2025
40	Bradley Collins	GK	(England)	Southampton	18 February 1997 (aged 26)	31	0	Barnsley	17 July 2023	Undisclosed	30 June 2026
44	Cian Tyler	GK	(Wales) (England)	Coventry	22 March 2002 (aged 21)	0	0	Academy	10 November 2016	—N/a	30 June 2025
48	Luke Bell	GK	(England)		1 March 2004 (aged 19)	0	0	Academy	1 July 2022	—N/a	30 June 2024
Defenders
2	Luis Binks	CB	(England)	Gillingham	2 September 2001 (aged 21)	28	0	Bologna	28 July 2023	Loan	31 May 2024
3	Jay Dasilva	LB	(Wales) (England)	Luton	22 April 1998 (aged 25)	42	0	Bristol City	1 July 2023	Free Transfer	30 June 2027
4	Bobby Thomas	CB	(England)	Chester	30 January 2001 (aged 22)	48	2	Burnley	22 July 2023	Undisclosed	30 June 2027
15	Liam Kitching	CB	(England)	Harrogate	25 October 1999 (aged 23)	32	1	Barnsley	1 September 2023	Undisclosed	30 June 2027
21	Jake Bidwell	LB	(England)	Southport	21 March 1993 (aged 30)	105	2	Swansea City	17 January 2022	Free Transfer	30 June 2025
22	Joel Latibeaudiere	CB	(Jamaica) (England)	Doncaster	6 January 2000 (aged 23)	44	3	Swansea City	18 July 2023	Compensation	30 June 2027
27	Milan van Ewijk	RB	(Netherlands)	Amsterdam	8 September 2000 (aged 22)	47	2	Heerenveen	27 July 2023	Undisclosed	30 June 2027
41	Dermi Lusala	RB	(England)	Edmonton	16 January 2003 (aged 20)	0	0	Tottenham Hotspur	1 July 2022	Free Transfer	30 June 2024
Midfielders
6	Liam Kelly	DM	(Scotland) (England)	Newport Pagnell	10 February 1990 (aged 33)	180	3	Leyton Orient	1 July 2017	Free Transfer	30 June 2024
7	Tatsuhiro Sakamoto	RW	(Japan)	Tokyo	22 October 1996 (aged 26)	33	7	KV Oostende	10 July 2023	Undisclosed	30 June 2026
8	Jamie Allen	CM	(England)	Rochdale	29 January 1995 (aged 28)	147	11	Burton Albion	1 July 2019	Undisclosed	30 June 2025
10	Callum O'Hare	AM	(England)	Solihull	1 May 1998 (aged 25)	142	18	Aston Villa	15 July 2020	Free Transfer	30 June 2024
14	Ben Sheaf	DM	(England)	Dartford	5 February 1998 (aged 25)	110	9	Arsenal	1 July 2021	Undisclosed	30 June 2026
28	Josh Eccles	CM	(England)	Coventry	6 April 2000 (aged 23)	117	2	Academy	1 July 2018	—N/a	30 June 2027
29	Victor Torp	CM	(Denmark)	Lemvig	30 July 1999 (aged 23)	20	1	Sarpsborg	11 January 2024	Undisclosed	30 June 2028
45	Kasey Palmer	AM	(Jamaica) (England)	Lewisham	9 November 1996 (aged 26)	69	8	Bristol City	1 July 2022	Free Transfer	30 June 2025
47	Evan Eghosa	AM	(Austria) (England)	Linz	5 August 2005 (aged 17)	0	0	Academy	1 July 2022	—N/a	30 June 2025
Forwards
9	Ellis Simms	CF	(England)	Oldham	5 January 2001 (aged 22)	53	19	Everton	7 July 2023	Undisclosed	30 June 2027
11	Haji Wright	FW	(United States)	Los Angeles	27 March 1998 (aged 25)	50	19	Antalyaspor	4 August 2023	£7,700,000	30 June 2027
24	Matt Godden	CF	(England)	Canterbury	29 July 1991 (aged 31)	156	50	Peterborough United	6 August 2019	£750,000	30 June 2025
30	Fábio Tavares	FW	(Portugal) (England)	Matosinhos	22 January 2001 (aged 22)	28	4	Rochdale	1 February 2021	Undisclosed	30 June 2025
46	Bradley Stretton	RW	(England)	Coventry	9 September 2004 (aged 18)	0	0	Academy	1 July 2023	—N/a	30 June 2024
54	Kai Andrews	FW	(Wales)		6 August 2006 (aged 16)	0	0	Academy	1 July 2022	—N/a	30 June 2026
59	Aidan Dausch	FW	(England)	London	1 June 2006 (aged 17)	1	0	Academy	1 July 2023	—N/a	30 June 2025
Out on loan
32	Jack Burroughs	RB	(Scotland) (England)	Coventry	21 March 2001 (aged 22)	20	0	Academy	7 August 2017	—N/a	30 June 2025
36	Ryan Howley	CM	(Wales) (England)	Nuneaton	23 November 2003 (aged 19)	7	0	Academy	1 July 2021	—N/a	30 June 2025
43	Marco Rus	MF	(Romania) (England)	Florești	23 January 2003 (aged 20)	0	0	Southampton	17 July 2021	Free Transfer	30 June 2025
49	Justin Obikwu	CF	(Trinidad and Tobago) (England)		18 February 2004 (aged 19)	0	0	Academy	1 July 2022	—N/a	30 June 2025
50	Riccardo Di Trolio	CB	(Italy) (England)		14 August 2005 (aged 17)	0	0	St Albans City	26 January 2023	Free Transfer	30 June 2025
—N/a	Ephron Mason-Clark	LW	(England)	Lambeth	25 August 1999 (age 27)	0	0	Peterborough United	1 February 2024	Undisclosed	30 June 2028
Left before the end of the season
5	Kyle McFadzean	CB	(England)	Sheffield	20 February 1987 (aged 36)	156	7	Burton Albion	1 July 2019	Free Transfer	30 June 2024
26	Yasin Ayari	CM	(Sweden)	Solna	6 October 2003 (aged 19)	0	0	Brighton & Hove Albion	21 August 2023	Loan	31 May 2024
35	Danny Cashman	FW	(England)	Crawley	8 January 2001 (aged 22)	0	0	Brighton & Hove Albion	6 August 2021	Free Transfer	30 June 2024
37	Tom Costello	CF	(England)		23 February 2003 (aged 20)	0	0	Wigan Athletic	1 July 2022	Free Transfer	30 June 2024
38	Gustavo Hamer	CM	(Netherlands) (Brazil)	Itajaí	24 June 1997 (aged 26)	130	19	PEC Zwolle	3 July 2020	£1,300,000	30 June 2024

* Player age and appearances/goals for the club as of beginning of 2023–24 season.

=== Appearances ===
Correct as of 4 May 2024

Number	Nationality	Player	Position	Championship	FA Cup	EFL Cup	Total
1	(England)	Simon Moore	GK				
2	(England)	Luis Binks	DF	15+3	3+1	1	23
3	(Wales)	Jay Dasilva	DF	25+12	2+3		42
4	(England)	Bobby Thomas	DF	42+2	3+2		49
6	(Scotland)	Liam Kelly	MF	11+5	1+1	1	19
7	(Japan)	Tatsuhiro Sakamoto	MF	20+9	2	1	32
8	(England)	Jamie Allen	MF	14+8	0+3		25
9	(England)	Ellis Simms	FW	30+16	5+1	0+1	53
10	(England)	Callum O'Hare	MF	18+13	3+2		36
11	(United States)	Haji Wright	FW	31+13	4+1	1	50
13	(England)	Ben Wilson	GK	18	4		22
14	(England)	Ben Sheaf	MF	30+1	4	0+1	36
15	(England)	Liam Kitching	DF	25+3	4		32
21	(England)	Jake Bidwell	DF	24+9	4	1	38
22	(Jamaica)	Joel Latibeaudiere	DF	28+13	6	1	48
24	(England)	Matt Godden	FW	23+12	1+4	1	41
27	(Netherlands)	Milan van Ewijk	DF	34+8	4+2	1	49
28	(England)	Josh Eccles	MF	38+6	5+1	0+1	51
29	(Denmark)	Victor Torp	MF	8+7	3+2		20
30	(Portugal)	Fábio Tavares	FW	1+4	1+4		10
32	(Scotland)	Jack Burroughs	DF				
36	(Wales)	Ryan Howley	MF			1	1
40	(England)	Bradley Collins	GK	28	2	1	31
41	(England)	Dermi Lusala	DF				
43	(Romania)	Marco Rus	MF				
44	(Wales)	Cian Tyler	GK				
45	(Jamaica)	Kasey Palmer	MF	21+11	5	0+1	38
46	(England)	Bradley Stretton	FW				
47	(Austria)	Evan Eghosa	MF				
48	(England)	Luke Bell	GK				
49	(Trinidad and Tobago)	Justin Obikwu	FW				
50	(Italy)	Riccardo Di Trolio	DF				
54	(Wales)	Kai Andrews	FW	0+2			2
59	(England)	Aidan Dausch	FW	0+2			2
	(England)	Ephron Mason-Clark	MF				
Left before the end of the season
5	(England)	Kyle McFadzean	DF	15			15
26	(Sweden)	Yasin Ayari	MF	6+7			13
35	(England)	Danny Cashman	FW				
37	(England)	Tom Costello	FW				
38	(Netherlands)	Gustavo Hamer	MF	1		1	2

=== Goalscorers ===
Correct as of 4 May 2024

Number	Nationality	Player	Position	Championship	FA Cup	EFL Cup	Total
9	(England)	Ellis Simms	FW	13	6	0	19
11	(United States)	Haji Wright	FW	16	3	0	19
10	(England)	Callum O'Hare	MF	6	4	0	10
24	(England)	Matt Godden	FW	6	2	1	9
7	(Japan)	Tatsuhiro Sakamoto	MF	7	0	0	7
14	(England)	Ben Sheaf	MF	3	1	0	4
45	(Jamaica)	Kasey Palmer	MF	2	2	0	4
22	(Jamaica)	Joel Latibeaudiere	DF	2	1	0	3
30	(Portugal)	Fabio Tavares	FW	1	2	0	3
4	(England)	Bobby Thomas	DF	2	0	0	2
27	(Netherlands)	Milan van Ewijk	DF	2	0	0	2
5	(England)	Kyle McFadzean	DF	1	0	0	1
8	(England)	Jamie Allen	MF	1	0	0	1
15	(England)	Liam Kitching	DF	1	0	0	1
21	(England)	Jake Bidwell	DF	1	0	0	1
26	(Sweden)	Yasin Ayari	MF	1	0	0	1
28	(England)	Josh Eccles	MF	1	0	0	1
29	(Denmark)	Victor Torp	MF	0	1	0	1
Own Goals				4	0	0	4
Totals				70	22	1	93

=== Yellow cards ===
Correct as of 4 May 2024

Number	Nationality	Player	Position	Championship	FA Cup	EFL Cup	Total
28	(England)	Josh Eccles	MF	12	0	0	12
45	(Jamaica)	Kasey Palmer	MF	9	2	0	11
4	(England)	Bobby Thomas	DF	9	1	0	10
14	(England)	Ben Sheaf	MF	7	1	0	8
22	(Jamaica)	Joel Latibeaudiere	DF	8	0	0	8
3	(Wales)	Jay Dasilva	DF	4	2	0	6
21	(England)	Jake Bidwell	DF	6	0	0	6
2	(England)	Luis Binks	DF	4	0	0	4
5	(England)	Kyle McFadzean	DF	4	0	0	4
15	(England)	Liam Kitching	DF	3	1	0	4
27	(Netherlands)	Milan van Ewijk	DF	4	0	0	4
40	(England)	Bradley Collins	GK	3	1	0	4
7	(Japan)	Tatsuhiro Sakamoto	MF	3	0	0	3
9	(England)	Ellis Simms	FW	3	0	0	3
11	(United States)	Haji Wright	FW	3	0	0	3
24	(England)	Matt Godden	FW	2	0	0	2
26	(Sweden)	Yasin Ayari	MF	2	0	0	2
6	(Scotland)	Liam Kelly	MF	1	0	0	1
8	(England)	Jamie Allen	MF	1	0	0	1
10	(England)	Callum O'Hare	MF	1	0	0	1
36	(Wales)	Ryan Howley	MF	0	0	1	1
Totals				89	8	1	98

=== Red cards ===
Correct as of 27 April 2024

Number	Nationality	Player	Position	Championship	FA Cup	EFL Cup	Total
15	(England)	Liam Kitching	DF	3	0	0	3
Totals				3	0	0	3

=== Captains ===
Correct as of 4 May 2024

Number	Nationality	Player	Position	Championship	FA Cup	EFL Cup	Total
14	(England)	Ben Sheaf	MF	15	4	0	18
6	(Scotland)	Liam Kelly	MF	11	1	1	13
5	(England)	Kyle McFadzean	DF	10	0	0	10
22	(Jamaica)	Joel Latibeaudiere	DF	5	1	0	6
24	(England)	Matt Godden	FW	4	0	0	4
8	(England)	Jamie Allen	MF	1	0	0	1
Totals				46	6	1	53

=== Penalties awarded ===
Number	Nationality	Player	Position	Date	Opponents	Ground	Success
24	(England)	Matt Godden	FW	9 August 2023	AFC Wimbledon	Plough Lane	✓
24	(England)	Matt Godden	FW	2 September 2023	Watford	Coventry Building Society Arena	✗
24	(England)	Matt Godden	FW	2 December 2023	Ipswich Town	Portman Road	✗
10	(England)	Callum O'Hare	MF	6 January 2024	Oxford United	Coventry Building Society Arena	✓
11	(United States)	Haji Wright	FW	11 February 2024	Millwall	Coventry Building Society Arena	✓
11	(United States)	Haji Wright	FW	1 March 2024	West Bromwich Albion	The Hawthorns	✓
11	(United States)	Haji Wright	FW	9 March 2024	Watford	Vicarage Road	✓
11	(United States)	Haji Wright	FW	9 April 2024	Southampton	St Mary's Stadium	✗
11	(United States)	Haji Wright	FW	21 April 2024	Manchester United	Wembley Stadium	✓

=== Hat-tricks ===
Number	Nationality	Player	Position	Date	Opponents	Ground	Result
9	(England)	Ellis Simms	FW	26 February 2024	Maidstone United	Coventry Building Society Arena	5–0
9	(England)	Ellis Simms	FW	5 March 2024	Rotherham United	Coventry Building Society Arena	5–0

=== Suspensions served ===
Number	Nationality	Player	Position	Date suspended	Reason	Matches missed
15	(England)	Liam Kitching	DF	26 December 2023	1 red card	Swansea City (H); Middlesbrough (A); Oxford United (H)
15	(England)	Liam Kitching	DF	3 February 2024	1 red card	Sheffield Wednesday (H); Millwall (H)
45	(Jamaica)	Kasey Palmer	MF	16 March 2024	2 yellow cards	Manchester United (neutral)
15	(England)	Liam Kitching	DF	27 April 2024	1 red card	Ipswich Town (H); Queens Park Rangers (H) + 1 game TBC

=== Monthly & weekly awards ===
Number	Nationality	Player	Position	Date	Award	Ref
	(England)	Mark Robins	Manager	14 August 2023	EFL Championship Team of the Week	
14	(England)	Ben Sheaf	MF	14 August 2023	EFL Championship Team of the Week	
24	(England)	Matt Godden	FW	21 September 2023	EFL Championship Team of the Week	
9	(England)	Ellis Simms	FW	2 October 2023	EFL Championship Team of the Week	
4	(England)	Bobby Thomas	DF	5 October 2023	EFL Championship Team of the Week	
28	(England)	Josh Eccles	MF	9 October 2023	EFL Championship Team of the Week	
14	(England)	Ben Sheaf	MF	26 November 2023	EFL Championship Team of the Week	
21	(England)	Jake Bidwell	DF	26 November 2023	EFL Championship Team of the Week	
28	(England)	Josh Eccles	MF	26 November 2023	EFL Championship Team of the Week	
40	(England)	Bradley Collins	GK	26 November 2023	EFL Championship Team of the Week	
27	(Netherlands)	Milan van Ewijk	DF	30 November 2023	EFL Championship Team of the Week	
40	(England)	Bradley Collins	GK	30 November 2023	EFL Championship Team of the Week	
10	(England)	Callum O'Hare	MF	11 December 2023	EFL Championship Team of the Week	
27	(Netherlands)	Milan van Ewijk	DF	11 December 2023	EFL Championship Team of the Week	
10	(England)	Callum O'Hare	MF	14 December 2023	EFL Championship Team of the Week	
4	(England)	Bobby Thomas	DF	19 December 2023	EFL Championship Team of the Week	
	(England)	Mark Robins	Manager	24 December 2023	EFL Championship Team of the Week	
7	(Japan)	Tatsuhiro Sakamoto	MF	24 December 2023	EFL Championship Team of the Week	
10	(England)	Callum O'Hare	MF	24 December 2023	EFL Championship Team of the Week	
40	(England)	Bradley Collins	GK	24 December 2023	EFL Championship Team of the Week	
7	(Japan)	Tatsuhiro Sakamoto	MF	27 December 2023	EFL Championship Team of the Week	
	(England)	Mark Robins	Manager	2 January 2024	EFL Championship Team of the Week	
7	(Japan)	Tatsuhiro Sakamoto	MF	2 January 2024	EFL Championship Team of the Week	
10	(England)	Callum O'Hare	MF	15 January 2024	EFL Championship Team of the Week	
14	(England)	Ben Sheaf	MF	23 January 2024	EFL Championship Team of the Week	
11	(United States)	Haji Wright	FW	12 February 2024	EFL Championship Team of the Week	
	(England)	Mark Robins	Manager	7 March 2024	EFL Championship Team of the Week	
9	(England)	Ellis Simms	FW	7 March 2024	EFL Championship Team of the Week	
22	(Jamaica)	Joel Latibeaudiere	DF	7 March 2024	EFL Championship Team of the Week	
9	(England)	Ellis Simms	FW	30 March 2024	EFL Championship Team of the Week	
28	(England)	Josh Eccles	MF	8 April 2024	EFL Championship Team of the Week	
40	(England)	Bradley Collins	GK	30 April 2024	EFL Championship Team of the Week	

=== End-of-season awards ===
Number	Nationality	Player	Position	Date	Award	Ref
14	(England)	Ben Sheaf	MF	3 May 2024	CCFPA Player of the Season Award	
9	(England)	Ellis Simms	FW	5 May 2024	CCFC Top Goalscorer	
11	(United States)	Haji Wright	FW	5 May 2024	CCFC Top Goalscorer	
21	(England)	Jake Bidwell	DF	5 May 2024	Nuneaton & Bedworth Supporter's Club Player of the Season	
27	(Netherlands)	Milan van Ewijk	DF	5 May 2024	London Supporter's Club Player of the Season	
9	(England)	Ellis Simms	FW	5 May 2024	CCFC Young Player of the Season	
14	(England)	Ben Sheaf	MF	5 May 2024	CCFC Community Player of the Season	
	(England)	Mark Robins	Manager	5 May 2024	CCFC Michelle Ridley Award	
9	(England)	Ellis Simms	FW	5 May 2024	CCFC JSB Player of the Season	
11	(United States)	Haji Wright	FW	5 May 2024	CCFC Goal of the Season	
	Coventry City vs Manchester United (FA Cup semi-final)			5 May 2024	CCFC Match of the Season	
14	(England)	Ben Sheaf	MF	5 May 2024	CCFC Players' Player of the Season	
14	(England)	Ben Sheaf	MF	5 May 2024	CCFC Player of the Season	

== Transfers ==
=== Transfers in ===
Date	Position	Nationality	Name	From	Fee	Ref.
1 July 2023	LB	(Wales)	Jay Dasilva	(England) Bristol City	Free Transfer	
7 July 2023	CF	(England)	Ellis Simms	(England) Everton	Undisclosed	
10 July 2023	RW	(Japan)	Tatsuhiro Sakamoto	(Belgium) KV Oostende	Undisclosed	
17 July 2023	GK	(England)	Bradley Collins	(England) Barnsley	Undisclosed	
18 July 2023	CB	(Jamaica)	Joel Latibeaudiere	(Wales) Swansea City	Compensation	
22 July 2023	CB	(England)	Bobby Thomas	(England) Burnley	Undisclosed	
27 July 2023	RB	(Netherlands)	Milan van Ewijk	(Netherlands) Heerenveen	Undisclosed	
4 August 2023	FW	(United States)	Haji Wright	(Turkey) Antalyaspor	£7,700,000	
1 September 2023	CB	(England)	Liam Kitching	(England) Barnsley	Undisclosed	
11 January 2024	CM	(Denmark)	Victor Torp	(Norway) Sarpsborg	Undisclosed	
1 February 2024	LW	(England)	Ephron Mason-Clark	(England) Peterborough United	Undisclosed	
11 March 2024	CB	(England)	Kain Ryan	(England) Brighton & Hove Albion	Free Transfer	

=== Loans in ===
Date	Position	Nationality	Name	From	Until	Ref.
28 July 2023	CB	(England)	Luis Binks	(Italy) Bologna	End of Season	
21 August 2023	CM	(Sweden)	Yasin Ayari	(England) Brighton & Hove Albion	5 January 2024	(Note: On 5 January, Ayari was recalled to Brighton & Hove Albion, originally intended to be a season-long loan.)

=== New contracts ===
Date	Position	Nationality	Player	Contract Length	Contract Type	Team	Ref.
2 June 2023	DF	(Scotland)	Jack Burroughs	2 year (30 June 2025)	Contract Extension	First Team	
5 June 2023	MF	(Wales)	Ryan Howley	2 year (30 June 2025)	Contract Extension	First Team	
19 June 2023	MF	(Romania)	Marco Rus	2 year (30 June 2025)	Contract Extension	Academy	
30 June 2023	MF	(Scotland)	Liam Kelly	1 year (30 June 2024)	Contract Extension	First Team	
20 July 2023	FW	(Trinidad and Tobago)	Justin Obikwu	1 year (30 June 2024)	First professional contract	Academy	
31 July 2023	MF	(England)	Isaac Moore	3 year (30 June 2026)	First professional contract	Academy	
31 July 2023	MF	(Austria)	Evan Eghosa	2 year (30 June 2025)	First professional contract	Academy	
9 August 2023	FW	(England)	Matt Godden	2 year (30 June 2025)	Contract Extension	First Team	
12 January 2024	FW	(Wales)	Kai Andrews	2.5 year (30 June 2026)	First professional contract	Academy	
12 January 2024	FW	(Trinidad and Tobago)	Justin Obikwu	1.5 year (30 June 2025)	Contract Extension	Academy	

=== Loans out ===
Date	Position	Nationality	Name	To	Until	Ref.
10 August 2023	RB	(Scotland)	Jack Burroughs	(England) Lincoln City	End of Season	
24 August 2023	CF	(England)	Tom Costello	(England) Southport	26 November 2023	
28 August 2023	CM	(Wales)	Ryan Howley	(Scotland) Dundee	End of Season	
9 December 2023	MF	(Romania)	Marco Rus	(England) Chorley	8 January 2024	
23 December 2023	CB	(Italy)	Riccardo Di Trolio	(England) Bishop's Stortford	22 January 2024	
12 January 2024	CF	(Trinidad and Tobago)	Justin Obikwu	(England) Grimsby Town	End of Season	
1 February 2024	LW	(England)	Ephron Mason-Clark	(England) Peterborough United	End of Season	
14 February 2024	MF	(Romania)	Marco Rus	(Romania) Universitatea Cluj	End of Season	
2 March 2024	CB	(Italy)	Riccardo Di Trolio	(England) Welling United	End of Season	

=== Transfers out ===
Date	Position	Nationality	Name	To	Fee	Ref.
26 June 2023	LB	(Scotland)	Josh Reid	(Scotland) Ross County	Undisclosed	
30 June 2023	LW	(England)	Will Bapaga	(England) Buxton	Released	
30 June 2023	GK	(England)	Tom Billson	Retired	Released	
30 June 2023	DF	(Scotland)	George Burroughs	(England) Altrincham	Released	
30 June 2023	RB	(England)	Fankaty Dabo	(England) Forest Green Rovers	Released	
30 June 2023	RB	(France)	Julien Dacosta	(France) Sochaux	Released	
30 June 2023	LW	(Republic of Ireland)	Ricardo Dinanga	(England) Telford United	Released	
30 June 2023	CM	(Republic of Ireland)	Aidan Finnegan	(Northern Ireland) H&W Welders	Released	
30 June 2023	RB	(England)	Todd Kane	(Gibraltar) Manchester 62	Released	
30 June 2023	CF	(Republic of Ireland)	Sean Maguire	(England) Carlisle United	Released	
30 June 2023	CB	(Republic of Ireland)	Jay McGrath	(Republic of Ireland) St Patrick's Athletic	Released	
30 June 2023	CF	(England)	Harrison Nee	(England) Peterborough Sports	Released	
30 June 2023	CB	(England)	Malakai Reeve	(England) Barrow	Released	
30 June 2023	CB	(Scotland)	Michael Rose	(England) Stoke City	Released	
30 June 2023	RB	(England)	Blaine Rowe	(England) Barwell	Released	
30 June 2023	CF	(England)	Martyn Waghorn	(England) Derby County	Released	
30 June 2023	CF	(England)	Tyler Walker	(England) Lincoln City	Released	
13 July 2023	CF	(Sweden)	Viktor Gyökeres	(Portugal) Sporting CP	Undisclosed	
1 August 2023	CB	(Republic of Ireland)	Abel Alabi	(England) Alvechurch	Released	
12 August 2023	CM	(Netherlands)	Gustavo Hamer	(England) Sheffield United	Undisclosed	
1 September 2023	FW	(England)	Danny Cashman	(England) Worthing	Released	
31 January 2024	CB	(England)	Kyle McFadzean	(England) Blackburn Rovers	Free Transfer	
31 January 2024	CF	(England)	Tom Costello	(Republic of Ireland) Galway United	Free Transfer	
2 May 2024	RW	(England)	Rylie Siddall	(United States) Bowling Green SU	Free Transfer	
