= Ellis Simms =

English footballer (born 2001)

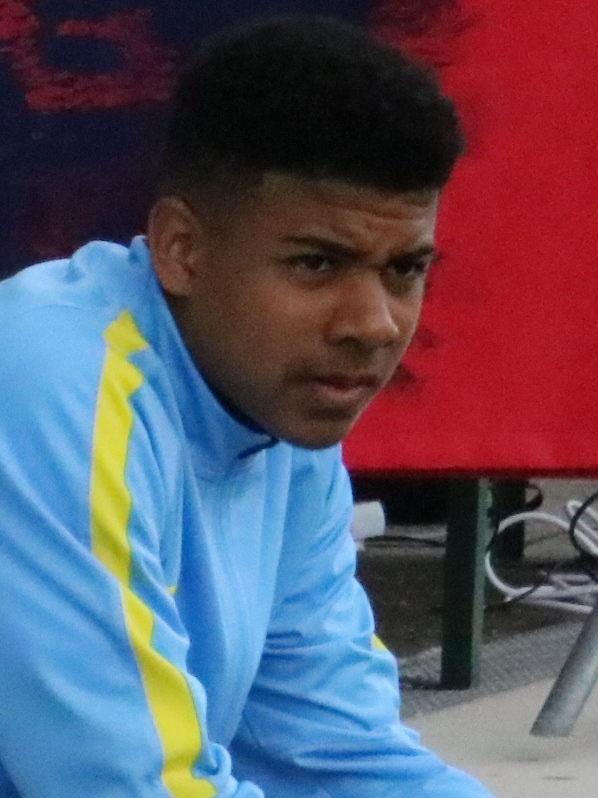
- Simms in 2016

Personal information
- Full name: Ellis Reco Simms
- Date of birth: 5 January 2001 (age 25)
- Place of birth: Oldham, England
- Height: 6 ft 3 in (1.91 m)
- Position: Striker

Team information
- Current team: Coventry City
- Number: 9

Youth career
- Blackburn Rovers
- Manchester City
- 2017–2020: Everton

Senior career*
Years	Team	Apps	(Gls)
2020–2023	Everton	12	(1)
2021	→ Blackpool (loan)	21	(8)
2022	→ Heart of Midlothian (loan)	17	(5)
2022	→ Sunderland (loan)	17	(7)
2023–	Coventry City	136	(33)
- * Club domestic league appearances and goals as of 17:18, 13 October 2026 (UTC)

Ellis Reco Simms (born 5 January 2001) is an English professional footballer who plays as a striker for Premier League club Coventry City.

== Club career ==
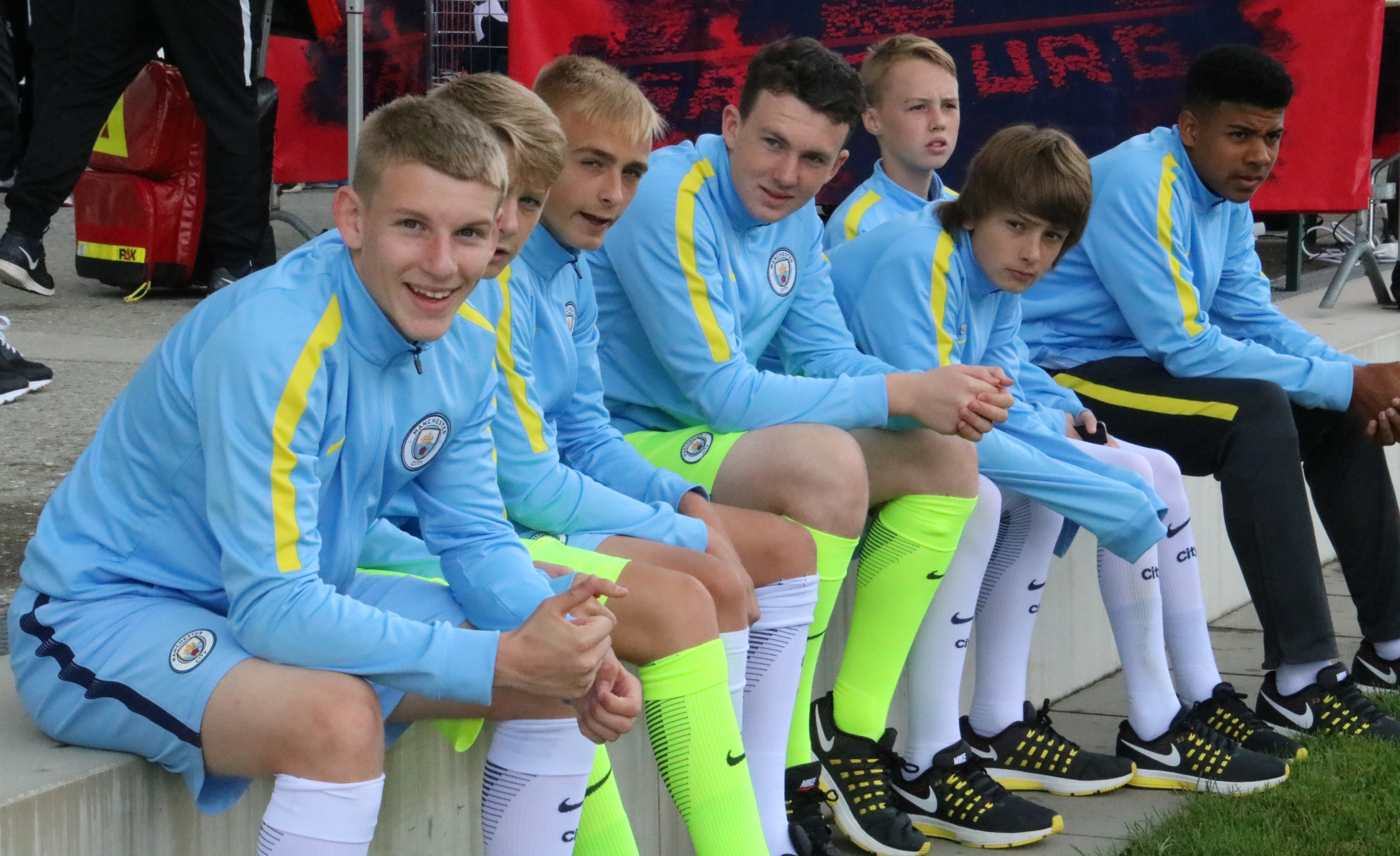
Simms (far right) pictured during his time at Manchester City in 2016.

=== Everton ===
Simms was born in Oldham, Greater Manchester. After playing for Blackburn Rovers and Manchester City as a youth, he signed for Everton at the age of 16. In July 2017, Simms won the golden boot at the CEE Cup in Czech Republic with six goals in four games. He turned professional in 2019 after scoring 46 goals in his final academy season.

In January 2021, Simms moved on loan to Blackpool, making his debut on 23 January 2021 in the FA Cup as a substitute against Brighton & Hove Albion in a 2–1 loss. In his second appearance and his league debut the following week, again as a substitute, he scored his first professional goals when he scored twice in a 5–0 win over Wigan Athletic.

On 26 January 2022, Simms joined Scottish Premiership side Heart of Midlothian on loan for the remainder of the 2021–22 season. He made his league debut the same day in a 2–1 loss at home to Celtic, coming off the bench at half time to replace Josh Ginnelly. He scored his first goal for Hearts three days later in a 2–0 home win against Motherwell.

On 29 July 2022, Simms signed for EFL Championship club Sunderland on loan for the duration of the 2022–23 season. He was recalled on 31 December 2022. He scored his first goal for Everton on 18 March 2023, scoring a late equaliser in a 2–2 draw away at Chelsea.

In June 2023, reports began to emerge that newly promoted EFL Championship club Ipswich Town were interested in signing Simms, with an initial bid of up to £4m believed to have been rejected by Everton.

=== Coventry City ===
In July 2023 he was linked with a transfer to Coventry City, and signed for the club later that month on a four-year contract for an undisclosed fee.

On 26 February 2024, Simms scored his first career hat trick in the first half of the fifth round of the 2023–24 FA Cup in a 5–0 rout of Maidstone United. After scoring his first goal, Simms held up his jersey to reveal a shirt bearing the name of his teammate, Tatsuhiro Sakamoto, who had been hospitalized due to an injury sustained during a game against Preston North End three days earlier. On 16 March, Simms scored a brace, including an equalizing stoppage time goal, against Wolverhampton Wanderers in the quarter-finals of the FA Cup, ending the game 3–2 in Coventry City's favour and helping the team progress beyond the quarter-finals for the first time since the 1986–87 FA Cup.

Simms was named EFL Championship Player of the Month for November 2025 having scored five goals in three matches.

== International career ==
Simms is eligible to play internationally for England, Poland, and Jamaica. On 6 November 2020, he was called up to the England U20 squad for a training camp. The following week, he played for England U20s as a second-half substitute in an unofficial friendly match against Aston Villa. In 2026, he received Polish citizenship.

== Career statistics ==
As of match played 12 October 2026

Appearances and goals by club, season and competition
Club	Season	League			National cup (Note: Includes FA Cup, Scottish Cup)		League cup (Note: Includes EFL Cup, Scottish League Cup)		Other		Total	
Club	Season	Division	Apps	Goals	Apps	Goals	Apps	Goals	Apps	Goals	Apps	Goals
Everton U21	2018–19	—	—		—		—		1 (Note: Appearance(s) in EFL Trophy)	0	1	0
Everton U21	2019–20	—	—		—		—		4	1	4	1
Everton U21	Total		—		—		—		5	1	5	1
Everton	2020–21	Premier League	0	0	0	0	0	0	—		0	0
Everton	2021–22	Premier League	1	0	0	0	0	0	—		1	0
Everton	2022–23	Premier League	11	1	0	0	—		—		11	1
Everton	Total		12	1	0	0	0	0	—		12	1
Blackpool (loan)	2020–21	League One	21	8	1	0	—		2 (Note: Appearances in League One play-offs)	2	24	10
Heart of Midlothian (loan)	2021–22	Scottish Premiership	17	5	4	2	0	0	—		21	7
Sunderland (loan)	2022–23	Championship	17	7	—		0	0	—		17	7
Coventry City	2023–24	Championship	46	13	6	6	1	0	—		53	19
Coventry City	2024–25	Championship	43	6	1	0	2	1	0	0	46	7
Coventry City	2025–26	Championship	43	13	1	0	2	1	—		46	14
Coventry City	2026–27	Premier League	4	1	0	0	1	0	—		5	1
Coventry City	Total		136	33	8	6	6	2	0	0	150	41
Career total			203	54	13	8	6	2	7	3	229	67

== Honours ==
Coventry City

- EFL Championship: 2025–26

Individual

- EFL Championship Player of the Month: November 2025
