= Joel Latibeaudiere =

Jamaican footballer (born 2000)

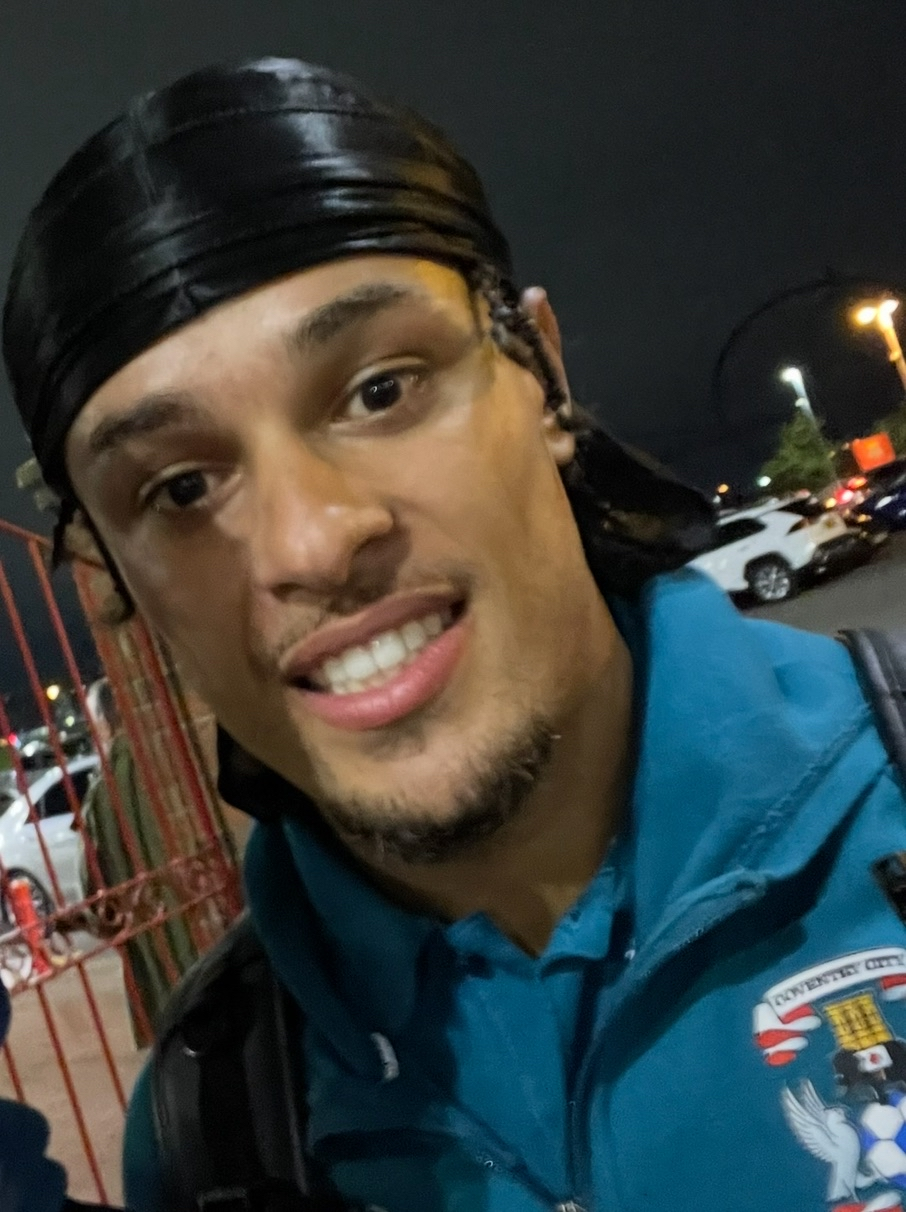
- Latibeaudiere in 2024

Personal information
- Full name: Joel Owen Latibeaudiere
- Date of birth: 6 January 2000 (age 26)
- Place of birth: Doncaster, England
- Height: 1.80 m (5 ft 11 in)
- Positions: Centre back; right back

Team information
- Current team: Coventry City
- Number: 22

Youth career
- 2013–2018: Manchester City

Senior career*
Years	Team	Apps	(Gls)
2018–2020	Manchester City	0	(0)
2019–2020	→ FC Twente (loan)	5	(1)
2020–2023	Swansea City	71	(3)
2023–	Coventry City	97	(2)

International career^{‡}
2016	England U16	4	(0)
2016–2017	England U17	16	(0)
2017–2018	England U18	5	(0)
2019	England U20	5	(0)
2023–	Jamaica	34	(0)
Medal record
Men's football
Representing England
FIFA U-17 World Cup
Winner	2017 India
UEFA European Under-17 Championship
Runner-up	2017 Croatia
Representing Jamaica
CONCACAF Nations League
Bronze medal – third place	2024 United States	Team
- * Club domestic league appearances and goals as of 17:04, 19 September 2026 (UTC) ‡ National team caps and goals as of 23:17, 2 October 2026 (UTC)

Joel Owen Latibeaudiere (born 6 January 2000) is a professional footballer who plays as a defender for Premier League club Coventry City. Born in England, he plays for the Jamaica national team.

== Club career ==
=== Manchester City ===
Latibeaudiere joined Manchester City at the age of thirteen but did not make a senior appearance at the club. He captained City's under-18s to the Premier League North title, and was part of the side that reached the FA Youth Cup final. He went on loan to FC Twente for the 2019–20 Eredivisie season, where he made five appearances and scored once.

=== Swansea City ===
In October 2020, Latibeaudiere joined Swansea City on a three-year contract. He scored his first goal for the club in an EFL Cup tie against Reading on 10 August 2021.

=== Coventry City ===
In July 2023, Latibeaudiere became Sky Blues manager Mark Robins fifth signing of the close season.

== International career ==
=== England ===
Born in England, Latibeaudiere is of Jamaican descent. He was a member of the side that finished runners up to Spain at the 2017 UEFA European Under-17 Championship and missed a penalty in the final. In October 2017 he was included in the squad for the 2017 FIFA U-17 World Cup and played the full game in the final as England defeated Spain to lift the trophy.

=== Jamaica ===
Latibeaudiere was called up to the Jamaica national team in May 2022. He made his unofficial debut in a 6–0 friendly defeat to Catalonia on 25 May.

In June 2023, Latibeaudiere was named to Jamaica's squad for the 2023 CONCACAF Gold Cup. He made his official debut for Jamaica in the tournament opener against the USA.

== Career statistics ==
=== Club ===
As of match played 19 September 2026

Appearances and goals by club, season and competition
Club	Season	League			National cup (Note: Includes KNVB Cup, FA Cup)		EFL Cup		Other		Total	
Club	Season	Division	Apps	Goals	Apps	Goals	Apps	Goals	Apps	Goals	Apps	Goals
Manchester City U23	2017–18	—			—		—		1 (Note: Appearance in EFL Trophy)	0	1	0
Manchester City U23	2018–19	—			—		—		1	0	1	0
Manchester City U23	Total		—		—		—		2	0	2	0
FC Twente (loan)	2019–20	Eredivisie	5	1	1	0	—		—		6	1
Swansea City	2020–21	Championship	8	0	2	0	0	0	—		10	0
Swansea City	2021–22	Championship	29	0	0	0	3	1	—		32	1
Swansea City	2022–23	Championship	34	2	2	0	1	0	—		37	2
Swansea City	Total		71	3	4	0	4	1	0	0	79	3
Coventry City	2023–24	Championship	45	2	6	1	1	0	0	0	48	3
Coventry City	2024–25	Championship	36	0	1	1	2	0	0	0	36	1
Coventry City	2025–26	Championship	15	0	1	0	0	0	—		15	0
Coventry City	2026–27	Premier League	1	0	0	0	2	0	—		3	0
Coventry City	Total		97	2	8	2	5	0	0	0	102	4
Career total			170	5	13	2	9	1	2	0	187	8

=== International ===
As of match played 2 October 2026

Appearances and goals by national team and year
National team	Year	Apps	Goals
Jamaica	2023	12	0
Jamaica	2024	11	0
Jamaica	2025	6	0
Jamaica	2026	5	0
Total		34	0

== Honours ==
Coventry City

- EFL Championship: 2025–26

England U17

- FIFA U-17 World Cup: 2017
- UEFA European Under-17 Championship runner-up: 2017
