= Kai Andrews =

Wales international footballer (born 2006)

Personal information
- Full name: Kai Bernard James Andrews
- Date of birth: 6 August 2006 (age 20)
- Place of birth: Birmingham, England
- Height: 1.86 m (6 ft 1 in)
- Positions: Central midfielder; right-back

Team information
- Current team: Oxford United
- Number: 4

Youth career
- 2017–2023: Coventry City

Senior career*
Years	Team	Apps	(Gls)
2023–	Coventry City	9	(0)
2024-2025	→ Motherwell (loan)	11	(0)
2025-2026	→ Hibernian (loan)	10	(1)
2026-	→ Oxford United (loan)	7	(1)

International career^{‡}
2023–2024	Wales U19	12	(2)
2025–	Wales U21	7	(0)
2025–	Wales	3	(0)
- * Club domestic league appearances and goals as of 22:54, 20 October 2026 (UTC) ‡ National team caps and goals as of 15:22, 8 October 2026 (UTC)

Kai Bernard James Andrews (born 6 August 2006) is a professional footballer who plays as a central midfielder for EFL League One club Oxford United on loan from Premier League club Coventry City, and the Wales national team.

== Club career ==
=== Coventry City ===
Andrews joined the youth academy of Coventry City at the age of 11. He made his professional debut, aged 17, on 12 August 2023 in a 3–0 Championship win against Middlesbrough, coming on as a substitute to replace Matt Godden after 98 minutes. On 12 January 2024, he signed his first professional contract with the club until 2026.

==== Loan to Motherwell ====
On 7 January 2025, Andrews joined Scottish Premiership club Motherwell on loan for the remainder of the 2024–25 season.

==== Loan to Hibernian ====
He returned to Scotland on loan in January 2026, joining Hibernian. Andrews scored his first goal for Hibs, and his first in professional football, in a 2–1 win against Celtic on 22 February.

==== Loan to Oxford United ====
On 28 August 2026, Andrews joined EFL League One side Oxford United on a five-month loan.

== International career ==
Born in England, Andrews is of Welsh descent through his mother, and Vincentian descent through his father. He qualifies for Wales through his maternal grandmother who was born in Abercarn.

In March 2025 Andrews was called up to the Wales senior squad for the first time for the World Cup qualifying matches against Kazakhstan and North Macedonia. On 6 June 2025 Andrews made his Wales under-21 debut in a friendly match against Norway.

He made his senior debut in a 1–0 friendly defeat to Canada on 9 September 2025.

== Career statistics ==
As of 11 April 2026

Club	Season	League			National cup (Note: Includes Scottish Cup, FA Cup)		League cup (Note: Includes Scottish League Cup, EFL Cup)		Other		Total	
Club	Season	Division	Apps	Goals	Apps	Goals	Apps	Goals	Apps	Goals	Apps	Goals
Coventry City	2023–24	Championship	2	0	0	0	0	0	0	0	2	0
Coventry City	2024–25	Championship	0	0	0	0	0	0	0	0	0	0
Coventry City	2025–26	Championship	7	0	1	0	2	0	—		10	0
Coventry City	Total		9	0	1	0	2	0	0	0	12	0
Motherwell (loan)	2024–25	Scottish Premiership	11	0	1	0	0	0	0	0	12	0
Hibernian (loan)	2025–26	Scottish Premiership	10	1	0	0	0	0	—		10	1
Career total			30	1	2	0	2	0	0	0	34	1

=== International ===
As of match played 6 June 2026

Appearances and goals by national team and year
National team	Year	Apps	Goals
Wales	2025	1	0
Wales	2026	2	0
Total		3	0
