= Josh Eccles =

English footballer

Personal information
- Full name: Joshua Elliot Eccles
- Date of birth: 6 April 2000 (age 26)
- Place of birth: Coventry, England
- Height: 1.81 m (5 ft 11 in)
- Positions: Midfielder; right-back

Team information
- Current team: Coventry City
- Number: 28

Youth career
- 2007–2018: Coventry City

Senior career*
| Years | Team | Apps | (Gls) |
| 2018– | Coventry City | 166 | (9) |
| 2020–2021 | → Gillingham (loan) | 12 | (0) |
- * Club domestic league appearances and goals as of 18:23, 4 May 2026 (UTC)

Joshua Elliot Eccles (born 6 April 2000) is an English professional footballer who plays as a midfielder for Premier League club Coventry City.

== Career ==
=== Coventry City ===
Eccles joined the youth system at Coventry City at the age of seven and progressed through the club's academy. He signed his first professional contract in July 2018 and made his senior debut in an EFL Trophy match against Cheltenham Town in November 2018.

During the 2019–20 season, Eccles made his first appearances in the senior team as Coventry won the EFL League One title and secured promotion to the EFL Championship. He made three league appearances during the campaign, alongside appearances in domestic cup competitions.

=== Loan to Gillingham ===
On 17 September 2020, Eccles joined Gillingham on a season-long loan in EFL League One. The move followed his performance against Gillingham in the EFL Cup, a match which Coventry lost on penalties. Gillingham manager Steve Evans praised Eccles' performance and highlighted his passing, physical strength and energy in midfield.

Eccles made 14 appearances in all competitions for Gillingham, including 12 league appearances, before being recalled by Coventry on 6 January 2021.

=== Return to Coventry City ===
After returning from his loan spell, Eccles continued to establish himself in Coventry's first-team squad. He signed a contract extension on 13 January 2023, committing his future to the club until June 2027.

On 29 April 2023, Eccles scored his first senior goal for Coventry in a 2–0 victory over Birmingham City. He became a more regular member of the side during the 2022–23 season, making 34 Championship appearances as Coventry reached the play-offs. Coventry were beaten by Luton Town in the final after a penalty shoot-out.

Eccles continued to feature regularly in midfield during the 2023–24 season, making 44 league appearances. He also played in Coventry's run to the semi-finals of the 2023–24 FA Cup, in which they were eliminated by Manchester United on penalties after a 3–3 draw.

During the 2024–25 season, Eccles made 39 Championship appearances and scored three goals. He remained an important option in Coventry's midfield as the team competed for a place in the play-offs in which they lost 3–2 on aggregate to Sunderland in the semi-final.

In the 2025–26 season, Eccles made 34 Championship appearances and scored four goals as Coventry won the Championship title and secured promotion to the Premier League. He contributed both as a starter and from the bench during the campaign.

== Career statistics ==
As of 25 August 2026

Appearances and goals by club, season and competition
| Club | Season | League | | | FA Cup | | League Cup | | Other | | Total | |
| Club | Season | Division | Apps | Goals | Apps | Goals | Apps | Goals | Apps | Goals | Apps | Goals |
|---|---|---|---|---|---|---|---|---|---|---|---|---|
| Coventry City | 2018–19 | League One | 0 | 0 | 0 | 0 | 0 | 0 | 1 (Note: Appearances in EFL Trophy) | 0 | 1 | 0 |
| Coventry City | 2019–20 | League One | 3 | 0 | 2 | 0 | 2 | 0 | 4 | 0 | 11 | 0 |
| Coventry City | 2020–21 | Championship | 7 | 0 | 1 | 0 | 1 | 0 | — | | 9 | 0 |
| Coventry City | 2021–22 | Championship | 5 | 0 | 2 | 0 | 0 | 0 | — | | 7 | 0 |
| Coventry City | 2022–23 | Championship | 34 | 1 | 0 | 0 | 1 | 0 | 3 (Note: Appearances in EFL Championship play-offs) | 0 | 38 | 1 |
| Coventry City | 2023–24 | Championship | 44 | 1 | 6 | 0 | 1 | 0 | — | | 51 | 1 |
| Coventry City | 2024–25 | Championship | 39 | 3 | 2 | 0 | 3 | 0 | 1 | 0 | 45 | 3 |
| Coventry City | 2025–26 | Championship | 34 | 4 | 1 | 0 | 0 | 0 | — | | 35 | 4 |
| Coventry City | 2026–27 | Premier League | 0 | 0 | 0 | 0 | 1 | 0 | — | | 1 | 0 |
| Coventry City | Total | | 166 | 9 | 14 | 0 | 9 | 0 | 9 | 0 | 198 | 9 |
| Gillingham (loan) | 2020–21 | League One | 12 | 0 | 0 | 0 | 0 | 0 | 2 | 0 | 14 | 0 |
| Career total | | | 178 | 9 | 14 | 0 | 9 | 0 | 11 | 0 | 212 | 9 |

== Honours ==
Coventry City

- EFL Championship: 2025–26
