= Dermi Lusala =

English footballer

Personal information
- Full name: Dermi Lusala
- Date of birth: 16 January 2003 (age 23)
- Place of birth: Edmonton, England
- Height: 1.85 m (6 ft 1 in)
- Position: Right back

Team information
- Current team: Maidstone United
- Number: 2

Youth career
- Chettle Court Rangers
- –2016: Brentford
- 2016–2022: Tottenham Hotspur

Senior career*
| Years | Team | Apps | (Gls) |
| 2022–2024 | Coventry City | 0 | (0) |
| 2022–2023 | → Barwell (loan) | 4 | (0) |
| 2024–2025 | Buxton | 27 | (0) |
| 2024 | → Matlock Town (loan) | 3 | (0) |
| 2025–2026 | Dagenham & Redbridge | 34 | (3) |
| 2026– | Maidstone United | 1 | (0) |

International career
| 2017 | England U15 | 1 | (0) |
| 2018–2019 | England U16 | 5 | (1) |
- * Club domestic league appearances and goals as of 15:01, 1 September 2026 (UTC)

Dermi Lusala (born 16 January 2003) is an English professional footballer who plays as a right back for National League South club Maidstone United.

Lusala is a product of the Tottenham Hotspur and Brentford academies and transferred to Coventry City in 2022. After failing to break into the first team squad, he dropped into non-League football after his release in 2024. Lusala was capped by England at U16 level.

== Club career ==
=== Youth years ===
A right back, Lusala began his career in the Brentford Academy and was a part of the U13 team which won the 2016 Elite Neon Cup. Following the closure of the academy at the end of the 2015–16 season, Lusala transferred into the Tottenham Hotspur Academy. He progressed to sign a one-year professional contract at the end of the 2020–21 season. Following an injury-plagued season in the Development Squad, during which he participated in first team training sessions, Lusala was released when his contract expired.

=== Coventry City ===
On 1 July 2022, Lusala signed a two-year contract with Championship club Coventry City on a free transfer. On 25 November 2022, he joined Southern League Premier Division Central club Barwell on a one-month loan and made four appearances. Lusala was a part of the Coventry City U21 team which reached the final of the 2022–23 Birmingham Senior Cup.

During the 2023–24 pre-season, Lusala was included in the first team squad for its training camp in Portugal. Lusala was an unused substitute on 16 occasions during the 2023–24 season and was released when his contract expired.

=== Buxton ===
After a successful trial, Lusala transferred to National League North club Buxton on 10 August 2024 and signed a one-year contract, with the option of a further year. He made eight appearances, before succumbing to injury. In order to build match fitness after his recovery, Lusala joined Northern Premier League Premier Division club Matlock Town on a one-month loan on 15 November and made three appearances. He made 29 appearances during a 2024–25 season which concluded with defeat in the National League North playoff quarter-finals. The club exercised its option on Lusala's contract for the 2025–26 season, but he elected to transfer away in June 2025.

=== Dagenham & Redbridge ===
On 27 June 2025, Lusala signed a two-year contract with National League South club Dagenham & Redbridge for an undisclosed fee. He made 38 appearances and scored three goals during a mid-table 2025–26 season and had his contract terminated by mutual consent in June 2026.

=== Maidstone United ===
On 19 June 2026, Lusala signed an undisclosed-length contract with National League South club Maidstone United.

== International career ==
Lusala was capped by England at under-15 and under-16 level.

== Personal life ==
Lusala attended St Ignatius College, Enfield.

== Career statistics ==
As of match played 31 August 2026

Appearances and goals by club, season and competition
| Club | Season | League | | | FA Cup | | EFL Cup | | Other | | Total | |
| Club | Season | Division | Apps | Goals | Apps | Goals | Apps | Goals | Apps | Goals | Apps | Goals |
|---|---|---|---|---|---|---|---|---|---|---|---|---|
| Coventry City | 2023–24 | Championship | 0 | 0 | 0 | 0 | 0 | 0 | ― | | 0 | 0 |
| Barwell (loan) | 2022–23 | SL Premier Division Central | 4 | 0 | ― | | ― | | ― | | 4 | 0 |
| Buxton | 2024–25 | National League North | 27 | 0 | 0 | 0 | ― | | 2 (Note: 1 appearance in National League North play-offs, 1 appearance in Derbyshire Senior Cup) | 0 | 29 | 0 |
| Matlock Town (loan) | 2024–25 | NPL Premier Division | 3 | 0 | ― | | ― | | ― | | 3 | 0 |
| Dagenham & Redbridge | 2025–26 | National League South | 34 | 3 | 2 | 0 | ― | | 2 (Note: Appearances in FA Trophy) | 0 | 38 | 3 |
| Maidstone United | 2026–27 | National League South | 1 | 0 | 0 | 0 | ― | | 0 | 0 | 1 | 0 |
| Career total | | | 69 | 3 | 2 | 0 | 0 | 0 | 4 | 0 | 75 | 3 |
