= Tatsuhiro Sakamoto =

Japanese footballer

Tatsuhiro Sakamoto 坂元 達裕
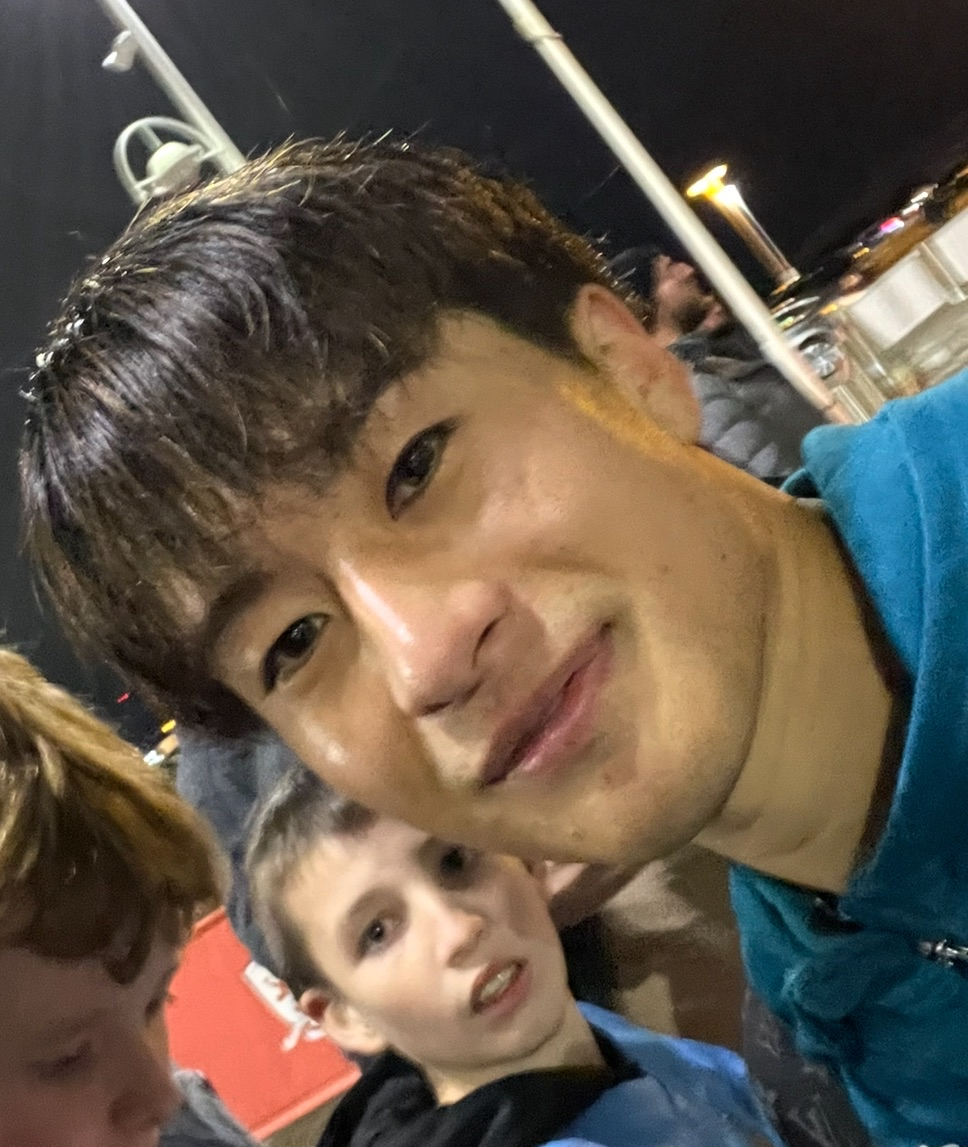
- Sakamoto in 2024

Personal information
- Date of birth: 22 October 1996 (age 30)
- Place of birth: Tokyo, Japan
- Height: 1.70 m (5 ft 7 in)
- Position: Winger

Team information
- Current team: Coventry City
- Number: 7

Youth career
- Aoba FC
- –2011: FC Tokyo
- 2012–2014: Maebashi Ikuei High School

College career
Years	Team	Apps	(Gls)
2015–2018	Toyo University		

Senior career*
Years	Team	Apps	(Gls)
2019	Montedio Yamagata	44	(7)
2020–2022	Cerezo Osaka	66	(8)
2022	→ KV Oostende (loan)	12	(0)
2022–2023	KV Oostende	30	(0)
2023–	Coventry City	113	(20)

International career^{‡}
2021–	Japan	3	(1)
- * Club domestic league appearances and goals as of 21 November 2026 ‡ National team caps and goals as of 14 November 2026

Tatsuhiro Sakamoto (坂元 達裕, Sakamoto Tatsuhiro; born 22 October 1996) is a Japanese professional footballer who plays as a winger for Premier League club Coventry City and the Japan national team.

== Club career ==
=== Early career ===
Starting out playing for Toyo University, Sakamoto was a specially designated player for Montedio Yamagata in the 2018 season. Despite not making an appearance during this time, Sakamoto fully joined Montedio Yamagata for the 2019 season playing in the J2 League. Sakamoto appeared in every single league game that Montedio Yamagata played in the 2019 season, scoring seven goals in the process. The team also advanced into the second round of the promotion playoffs but were beaten 1–0 by Tokushima Vortis.

=== Cerezo Osaka ===
After a successful debut season in the J2 League, Sakamoto was signed by Cerezo Osaka for the 2020 season. He went on to appear in 33 of their 38 league games and cement himself as part of the team.

=== KV Oostende ===
On 5 January 2022, Sakamoto joined Belgian club KV Oostende on loan until the end of the season, with an option to buy. This option was triggered later in 25 May, with Oostende signing him on a contract transfer lasting to 2025.

=== Coventry City ===
On 10 July 2023, Sakamoto signed for EFL Championship team Coventry City in a three-year deal. The transfer fee was undisclosed.

On 6 August, he made his debut for Coventry as a late substitute in a 2–1 loss at Leicester City. He scored his first goal in English football in a 3–0 win at Millwall on 25 November, becoming the first Japanese player to score for Coventry.

On 7 April 2025, Sakamoto signed a new two-year contract with Coventry.

== Playing style ==
Sakamoto primarily operates as a right winger. He is known for his dribbling ability, particularly his sharp changes of direction, which allow him to beat opposing defenders and create attacking opportunities from wide areas. His attacking style combines dangerous crosses with shots using his left foot. He is also noted for his defensive work rate, including immediately pressing opponents and tracking back persistently after his team loses possession.

His ability to vary his attacking approach was demonstrated during his time at Cerezo Osaka. A 2020 match report highlighted how he used a sharp change of direction to evade a defender on the right flank before advancing towards the byline and delivering a cross with his right foot.

Sakamoto has also described his dribbling as having an individual rhythm. In an interview, he explained that his playing style developed through incorporating techniques and ideas he had learned from other players while maintaining his own sense of play.

== International career ==
He made his debut for Japan national team on 7 June 2021 in a World Cup qualifier against Tajikistan.

In November 2026, Sakamoto earned a first international call-up in five years. On 14 November, he scored his first international goal with a 91st minute winner in a 3–2 victory over Brazil.

== Career statistics ==
=== Club ===
As of match played 21 November 2026

Appearances and goals by club, season and competition
Club	Season	League			National cup (Note: Includes Emperor's Cup, Belgian Cup, FA Cup)		League cup (Note: Includes J.League Cup, EFL Cup)		Other		Total	
Club	Season	Division	Apps	Goals	Apps	Goals	Apps	Goals	Apps	Goals	Apps	Goals
Montedio Yamagata	2019	J2 League	44	7	0	0	—		—		44	7
Cerezo Osaka	2020	J1 League	33	2	—		3	0	—		36	2
Cerezo Osaka	2021	J1 League	33	6	2	0	5	0	—		40	6
Cerezo Osaka	Total		66	8	2	0	8	0	—		76	8
KV Oostende (loan)	2021–22	Belgian Pro League	12	0	0	0	—		—		12	0
KV Oostende	2022–23	Belgian Pro League	30	0	2	0	—		—		32	0
Coventry City	2023–24	Championship	29	7	2	0	1	0	—		32	7
Coventry City	2024–25	Championship	42	4	2	0	2	0	2 (Note: Appearances in Championship play-offs)	0	48	4
Coventry City	2025–26	Championship	35	7	1	0	1	0	—		37	7
Coventry City	2026–27	Premier League	7	2	0	0	2	0	—		9	2
Coventry City	Total		113	20	5	0	5	0	2	0	126	20
Career total			265	35	9	0	13	0	2	0	290	35

=== International ===
As of match played 14 November 2026

Appearances and goals by national team and year
National team	Year	Apps	Goals
Japan	2021	2	0
Japan	2026	1	1
Total		3	1

Scores and results list Japan's goal tally first, score column indicates score after each Sakamoto goal.

List of international goals scored by Tatsuhiro Sakamoto
No.	Date	Venue	Opponent	Score	Result	Competition
1	14 November 2026	National Stadium, Kallang, Singapore	Brazil	3–2	3–2	2026 Mizuho Blue Challenge

== Honours ==
Coventry City

- EFL Championship: 2025–26
