= Rhys Carr =

Welsh football coach

Personal information
- Date of birth: 16 November 1986 (age 39)
- Place of birth: Cardiff, Wales
- Position: Right-back

Senior career*
Years	Team	Apps	(Gls)
- Cardiff Grange Quins
- Llanelli Town
- Pontypridd Town
- Barry Town
- Bridgend Town

Managerial career
- 2024: Coventry City (interim)
- * Club domestic league appearances and goals

Rhys Carr (born 16 November 1986) is a Welsh football coach and former player.

== Career ==
Carr played in the Cymru Premier for Cardiff Grange Quins and Llanelli Town. He also featured for Pontypridd Town, Barry Town and Bridgend Town.

Carr had positions in coaching at Swansea City and Cardiff City, prior to spending five years at Bristol City. He ended a two-year spell at Sheffield United in 2021 to return to his wife and children in Wales.

At the start of 2022, Carr was hired at Bristol Rovers as U21 and U18 Head Coach. He left that June for Wolverhampton Wanderers in the Premier League, for a development coaching role, working with individuals on the fringe of the first team. He was also an assistant manager for the Republic of Ireland women's national football team, and moved in July 2024 into the staff of Mark Robins at EFL Championship club Coventry City. He and former Coventry midfielder George Boateng were brought in as assistants after Adi Viveash left the club.

Robins was sacked on 7 November 2024 after over seven years in charge, with Coventry in 17th place. Carr was put in interim charge. He led the team to two draws and a loss against, at the time, the top 3 teams in the division before Frank Lampard was appointed on 28 November; Carr remained as first-team coach. He departed on 30 January 2025, as Lampard was forming his staff.

In June 2025, Carr returned to Bristol Rovers as assistant head coach to the returning Darrell Clarke. He departed the club in January 2026.

== Managerial statistics ==
As of match played 26 November 2024

Managerial record by team and tenure
Team	From	To	Record					Ref.
Team	From	To	P	W	D	L	Win %	Ref.
Coventry City (interim)	7 November 2024	27 November 2024	3	0	2	1	0.00	
Total			3	0	2	1	0.00	
