= Aidan Dausch =

American soccer player (born 2006)

Personal information
- Full name: Aidan William Dausch
- Date of birth: June 1, 2006 (age 20)
- Place of birth: London, England
- Height: 1.87 m (6 ft 2 in)
- Position: Forward

Team information
- Current team: Coventry City
- Number: 59

Youth career
- Luton Town
- 2021–2024: Coventry City

Senior career*
Years	Team	Apps	(Gls)
2024–	Coventry City	2	(0)
2025–2025	→ St Albans City (loan)	9	(2)
2025–2026	→ Forest Green Rovers (loan)	8	(0)
2026	→ Scunthorpe United (loan)	16	(0)

International career^{‡}
2024	United States U20	2	(0)
- * Club domestic league appearances and goals as of April 25, 2026 ‡ National team caps and goals as of October 15, 2024

Aidan William Dausch (born June 1, 2006) is a professional soccer player who plays as a forward for Premier League club Coventry City. Born in England, he is a youth international for the United States.

== Club career ==
Dausch joined the Coventry City Academy when he was 16 years old.

Dausch made his professional debut, aged 17, on April 27, 2024, in a 0–0 Championship draw with Blackburn Rovers, coming on as a substitute to replace Haji Wright after 86 minutes. Dausch came on again in the following game against Ipswich Town to replace Kasey Palmer after 96 minutes.

On June 17, 2024, it was announced that Dausch had signed his first professional contract with Coventry City.

On February 8, 2025, Dausch joined National League South side St Albans City on an initial twenty-eight day loan, later extended until the end of the season.

On August 4, 2025, Dausch joined National League club Forest Green Rovers on a season-long loan deal. Dausch scored his first goal for the club in their FA Cup first round match against Luton Town. He was recalled by Coventry on January 9, 2026. A month later, he returned to the National League on loan, this time joining Scunthorpe United until the end of the season.

== International career ==
Dausch is eligible to represent the England through birth, France through his maternal grandfather. He holds French citizenship. In October 2024, he was called up to the United States U20s for a set of friendlies.

== Career statistics ==
As of April 18, 2026

Club	Season	League			FA Cup		League Cup		Other		Total	
Club	Season	Division	Apps	Goals	Apps	Goals	Apps	Goals	Apps	Goals	Apps	Goals
Coventry City	2023–24	Championship	2	0	0	0	0	0	0	0	2	0
St Albans City (loan)	2024–25	National League	9	2	0	0	—		—		9	2
Forest Green Rovers (loan)	2025–26	National League	8	0	1	1	—		—		9	1
Scunthorpe United (loan)	2025–26	National League	15	0	0	0	—		—		15	0
Career total			34	2	1	1	0	0	0	0	35	3

== Honours ==
Coventry City

- EFL Championship: 2025–26
