= Filippini =

Filippini is an Italian surname. Notable people with the surname include:

- Alberto Filippini (born 1987) Italian footballer
- Alfredo Filippini (1924–2020) was an Italian sculptor, painter, and illustrator.
- André Filippini (1924–2013), Swiss bobsledder
- Ange Michel Filippini (1834–1887), French public servant, Governor of Cochinchina
- Antonio Filippini (born 1973), Italian footballer
- Bruno Filippini (1945–2013), Italian singer
- Eduardo Filippini (born 1983), Argentine footballer
- Emanuele Filippini (born 1973), Italian footballer
- Francesco Filippini (1853–1895), Italian painter
- Giancarlo Filippini (born 1968), Italian footballer
- Gino Filippini (1900–1962), Italian composer
- Jacques Filippini (born 1950), French rower
- Jérôme Filippini (born 1968), French civil servant
- Lorenzo Filippini (born 1995), Italian footballer
- Lucy Filippini (1672–1732), Italian pedagogue and co-founder of the current Religious Teachers Filippini
- Marcelo Filippini (born 1967), Uruguayan tennis player
- Marco Filippini (born 1988), Italian footballer
- Nicholas Tonti-Filippini (1956–2014), Australian bioethicist
- Ramon Filippini (1928–2008), Swedish former footballer of Italian descent
- Rocco Filippini (1943–2021), Italian classical cellist
- Silvia Filippini-Fantoni (born 1974), Italian US-based museum director

== See also ==
- Oratorio dei Filippini, Rome
- Church of the Philippine Fathers, Roman Catholic church located in Verona, Italy
