= Jaylon =

- Pronunciation: ja(y)-lon

Other names
- Related names: Jalen, Jalon, Jaylen

Jaylon is a unisex given name. Notable people with the name include:

- Jaylon Bather (born 1992), Bermudian footballer
- Jaylon Brown (born 1994), American basketball player
- Jaylon Carlies (born 2001), American college football player
- Jaylon Ferguson (1995–2022), American football player
- Jaylon Guilbeau (born 2004), American football player
- Jaylon Hadden (born 1998), Costa Rican footballer
- Jaylon Henderson (born 1997), American football player
- Jaylon Hutchings (born 1999), American football player
- Jaylon Johnson (born 1999), American football player
- Jaylon Jones (disambiguation), multiple people
- Jaylon McClain-Sapp (born 1998), American football player
- Jaylon Moore (disambiguation), multiple people
- Jaylon Scott (born 2000), American basketball player
- Jaylon Smith (born 1995), American football player
- Jaylon Tate (born 1995), American basketball player
- Jaylon Thomas (born 2000), American football player
- Jaylon Tyson (born 2002), American basketball player

== See also ==
- Jalen
- Jalon (disambiguation)
- Jaylen
- Jaylin/Jaelyn
