= Jalen =

Jalen is both a surname and given name. The given name, as well as variants like Jaylen and Jaylin, rose in popularity in the 1990s due to the success of basketball player Jalen Rose (named for his father James and uncle Leonard). Notable people with the name include:

== Given name ==
=== A ===
- Jalen Adams (born 1995), American basketball player
- Jalen Adaway (born 1998), American basketball player

=== B ===
- Jalen Beeks (born 1993), American baseball player
- Jalen Berger (born 2001), American football player
- Jalen Billups (born 1992), American basketball player
- Jalen Blesa (born 2001), Spanish footballer
- Jalen Brewster, American football player
- Jalen Bridges (born 2001), American basketball player
- Jalen Brooks (born 2000), American football player
- Jalen Brown (born 1995), American soccer player
- Jalen Brunson (born 1996), American basketball player

=== C ===
- Jalen Camp (born 1998), American football player
- Jalen Cannon (born 1993), American basketball player
- Jalen Carter (born 2001), American football player
- Jalen Catalon (born 2001), American football player
- Jalen Chatfield (born 1996), American ice hockey player
- Jalen Coker (born 2001), American football player
- Jalen Collins (born 1993), American football player
- Jalen Crisler (born 1994), American soccer player
- Jalen Cropper (born 2001), American football player
- Jalen Crutcher (born 1999), American basketball player

=== D ===
- Jalen Dalton (born 1997), American football player
- Jalen Davis (born 1996), American football player
- Jalen Duren (born 2003), American basketball player

=== E ===
- Jalen Elliott (born 1998), American football player

=== F ===
- Jalen Farmer (born 2004), American football player

=== G ===
- Jalen Graham (born 2001), American football player
- Jalen Green (born 2002), American basketball player
- Jalen Guyton (born 1997), American football player

=== H ===
- Jalen Haralson (born 2007), American basketball player
- Jalen Harris (born 1998), American basketball player
- Jalen Harris (American football) (born 1999), American football player
- Jalen Hawkins (born 2001), American soccer player
- Jalen Henry (born 1996), American basketball player
- Jalen Hood-Schifino (born 2003), American basketball player
- Jalen Hudson (born 1996), American basketball player
- Jalen Hurd (born 1995), American football player
- Jalen Hurts (born 1998), American football player
- Jalen Huskey (born 2003), American football player

=== J ===
- Jalen James (born 2000), American soccer player
- Jalen Jelks (born 1997), American football player
- Jalen Johnson (born 2001), American basketball player
- Jalen Jones (born 1993), American basketball player
- Jalen Jones (footballer) (born 1998), English footballer

=== K ===
- Jalen Kimber (born 2001), American football player
- Jalen Kitna (born 2003), American football player

=== L ===
- Jalen Lecque (born 2000), American basketball player
- Jalen Lott, American football player

=== M ===
- Jalen Mack (born 2005), American stock car racing driver
- Jalen Mayden (born 2000), American football player
- Jalen Mayfield (born 2000), American football player
- Jalen Mayo, American football player
- Jalen McDaniels (born 1998), American basketball player
- Jalen McLeod (born 2002), American football player
- Jalen McMillan (born 2001), American football player
- Jalen McMurray (born 2003), American football player
- Jalen Mills (born 1994), American football player
- Jalen Milroe (born 2002), American football player
- Jalen Moore (disambiguation), multiple people
- Jalen Morton (born 1997), American football player
- Jalen Myrick (born 1995), American football player

=== N ===
- Jalen Nailor (born 1999), American football player
- Jalen Neal (born 2003), American soccer player
- Jalen Ngonda (born 1994), American musician

=== P ===
- Jalen Parmele (born 1985), American football player
- Jalen Philpot (born 2000), Canadian football player
- Jalen Pickett (born 1999), American basketball player
- Jalen Pitre (born 1999), American football player
- Jalen Pokorn (born 1979), Slovenian footballer

=== R ===
- Jalen Ramsey (born 1994), American football player
- Jalen Rayam (born 2000), Canadian football player
- Jalen Reagor (born 1999), American football player
- Jalen Redmond (born 1999), American football player
- Jalen Reeves-Maybin (born 1995), American football player
- Jalen Reynolds (born 1992), American basketball player
- Jalen Richard (born 1993), American football player
- Jalen Riley (born 1993), American basketball player
- Jalen Rivers (born 2002), American football player
- Jalen Robinson (born 1994), American soccer player
- Jalen Rose (born 1973), American basketball player and sportscaster
- Jalen Royals (born 2003), American football player

=== S ===
- Jalen Saunders (born 1992), American football player
- Jalen Seegars (born 1998), American basketball player
- Jalen Slawson (born 1999), American basketball player
- Jalen Smith (born 2000), American basketball player
- Jalen Stroman (born 2003), American football player
- Jalen Suggs (born 2001), American basketball player
- Jalen Sundell (born 1999), American football player

=== T ===
- Jalen Tabor (born 1995), American football player
- Jalen Tate (born 1998), American basketball player
- Jalen Thompson (born 1998), American football player
- Jalen Tolbert (born 1999), American football player
- Jalen Tolliver (born 1995), American football player
- Jalen Tompkins (born 1997), American soccer player
- Jalen Travis (born 2002), American football player

=== V ===
- Jalen Virgil (born 1998), American football player

=== W ===
- Jalen Watson (born 2000), Canadian soccer player
- Jalen Wayne (born 1999), American football player
- Jalen White (born 2002), American football player
- Jalen Wilkerson (born 1995), American football player
- Jalen Williams (born 2001), American basketball player
- Jalen Wilson (born 2000), American basketball player
- Jalen Wydermyer (born 2000), American football player

== Surname ==
- Janez Jalen (1891–1966), Slovene writer and priest

== See also ==
- Jalon (disambiguation)
- Jaelen
- Jaelin
- Jaylan
- Jaylen
- Jaylin
- Jaylon
