= List of Swedish footballers in Serie A =

Listed are all the Swedish players that have appeared at least once for a team in Italy's Serie A. In bold are the players still active in current season and their teams for this.

== A ==
- Marcus Allbäck – Bari – 1997–98
- **Pontus Almqvist** – Lecce, **Parma** – 2023–
- Andreas Andersson – Milan – 1997–98
- Daniel Andersson – Bari, Venezia, Chievo, Ancona – 1998–2004
- Kennet Andersson – Bari, Bologna, Lazio – 1995–2000
- Kurt Andersson – Udinese, Varese – 1961–62, 1964–66
- Sune Andersson – Roma – 1950–51
- Mikael Antonsson – Bologna – 2011–14
- Samuel Armenteros – Benevento – 2017–18
- Jan Aronsson – Vicenza – 1956–58

== B ==
- Pär Bengtsson – Torino – 1949–50
- Orvar Bergmark – Roma – 1962–63
- Joachim Björklund – Vicenza, Venezia – 1995–96, 2001–02
- Jesper Blomqvist – Milan, Parma – 1996–98
- Rune Börjesson – Palermo – 1961–63
- Tomas Brolin – Parma – 1990–95, 1996–97
- Arvid Brorsson – Monza' – 2024–25

== C ==
- Mervan Celik – Pescara – 2012–13
- Dan Corneliusson – Como – 1984–89
- Jens Cajuste – Napoli – 2023–24

== D ==
- Samuel Dahl – Roma – 2024–25
- Martin Dahlin – Roma – 1996–97

== E ==
- Ivar Eidefjäll – Legnano, Novara – 1951–52, 1953–56
- Albin Ekdal – Juventus, Siena, Bologna, Cagliari, Sampdoria, Spezia – 2008–15, 2018–23
- Dan Ekner – Fiorentina, Spal – 1951–54
- Emmanuel Ekong – Empoli – 2022–25
- Joel Ekstrand – Udinese – 2010–12
- Johnny Ekström – Empoli, Reggiana – 1986–88, 1993–94
- Sebastian Eriksson – Cagliari – 2011–14

== F ==
- Alexander Farnerud – Torino – 2013–16
- **Amar Fatah** – **Lecce** – 2026–
- Ramon Filippini – Legnano – 1951–52
- Erik Friberg – Bologna – 2013–14

== G ==
- Riccardo Gagliolo – Carpi, Parma, Salernitana – 2015–16, 2018–22
- Ingvar Gärd – Sampdoria – 1950–51
- Andreas Granqvist – Genoa – 2011–13
- Gunnar Gren – Milan, Fiorentina, Genoa – 1949–56
- Samuel Gustafson – Torino – 2016–18
- Bengt Gustavsson – Atalanta – 1956–58, 1959–61

== H ==
- Melker Hallberg – Udinese – 2014–15
- Linus Hallenius – Genoa – 2012–13
- Kurt Hamrin – Juventus, Padova, Fiorentina, Milan, Napoli – 1956–71
- Magnus Hedman – Ancona – 2003–04
- Filip Helander – Verona, Bologna – 2015–19
- **Isak Hien** – Verona, **Atalanta** – 2022–
- Oscar Hiljemark – Palermo, Genoa – 2015–19
- Åke Hjalmarsson – Torino – 1949–50, 1951–52
- **Emil Holm** – Spezia, Atalanta, **Bologna**, Juventus – 2022–
- Hans Holmqvist – Cesena – 1988–90
- Glenn Hysén – Fiorentina – 1987–89

== I ==
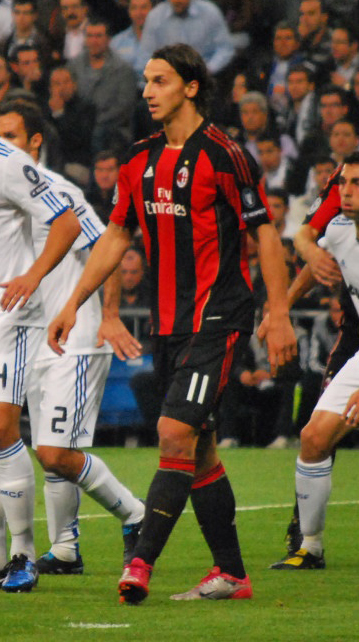
Zlatan Ibrahimović playing for Milan. He was the Serie A top scorer twice, once for Inter (2008–09) and the other for Milan (2011–12), and he also played for Juventus. He won the Serie A 7 times (5 officially), and scored 155 goals in the league.

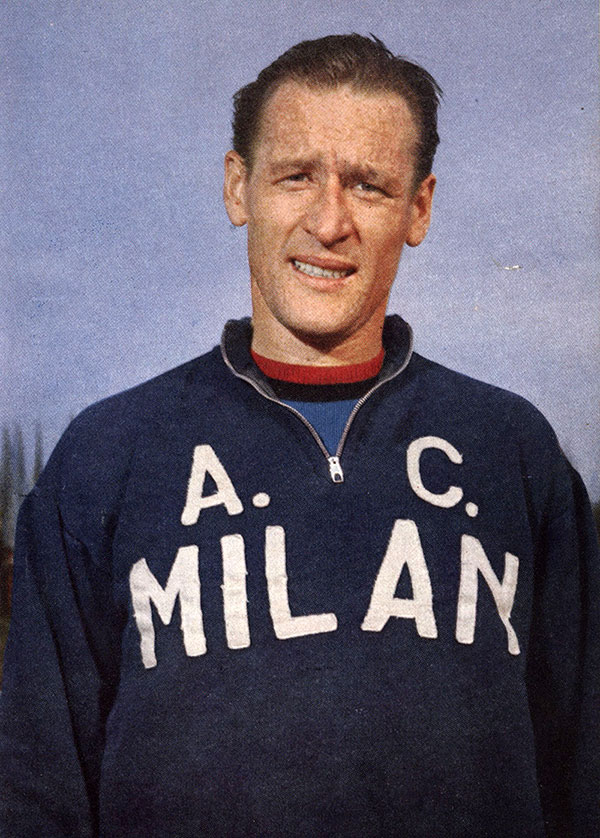
Nils Liedholm in 1959. He played and coached Milan

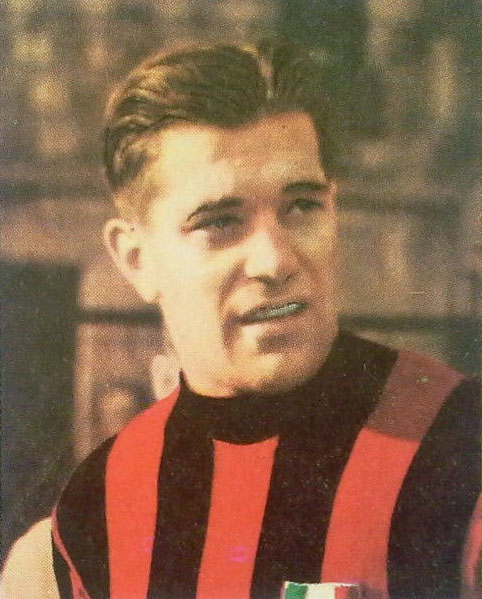
Gunnar Nordahl with Milan. He is the foreign player who scored more goals in Serie A (225) and the 3rd best scorer in the history of the league.

- Zlatan Ibrahimović – Juventus, Inter, Milan – 2004–09, 2010–12, 2019–23
- Klas Ingesson – Bari, Bologna, Lecce – 1995–96, 1997–2001
- Svante Ingelsson – Udinese – 2017–19

== J ==
- Pontus Jansson – Torino – 2014–16
- Hans Jeppson – Atalanta, Napoli, Torino – 1951–57
- Torbjörn Jonsson – Fiorentina, Roma, Mantova – 1961–65, 1966–67

== K ==
- Jesper Karlsson – Bologna, Lecce – 2023–25
- **Jesper Karlström** – **Udinese** – 2024–
- Emil Krafth – Bologna – 2015–18
- Dejan Kulusevski – Atalanta, Parma, Juventus – 2018–22

== L ==
- **Adrian Lahdo** – **Como** – 2026–
- Valentino Lai – Venezia – 2001–02
- Lars Larsson – Atalanta – 1984–85
- Nils Liedholm – Milan – 1949–61
- Anders Limpar – Cremonese – 1989–90
- Bengt Lindskog – Udinese, Inter, Lecco – 1956–62
- Sigvard Löfgren – Lazio, Spal – 1951–52, 1953–56
- Teddy Lučić – Bologna – 1998–2000

== M ==
- Bror Mellberg – Genoa – 1950–51
- Olof Mellberg – Juventus – 2008–09

== N ==
- Stellan Nilsson – Genoa – 1950–52
- **Alieu Njie** – **Torino**, **Fiorentina** – 2024–
- Bertil Nordahl – Atalanta – 1948–51
- Gunnar Nordahl – Milan, Roma – 1948–58
- Knut Nordahl – Roma – 1950–51

== O ==
- Joakim Olausson – Atalanta – 2013–14
- Robin Olsen – Roma, Cagliari – 2018–20
- Jacob Ondrejka – Parma – 2024–26
- Yksel Osmanovski – Bari, Torino – 1998–2003

== P ==
- Karl-Erik Palmér – Legnano, Juventus – 1951–52, 1953–54, 1958–59
- Joakim Persson – Atalanta – 1996–97
- Robert Prytz – Atalanta, Verona – 1988–90, 1991–92

== Q ==
- Robin Quaison – Palermo – 2014–17

== R ==
- Mathias Ranégie – Udinese – 2012–14
- Marcus Rohdén – Crotone – 2016–18
- Kjell Rosén – Torino, Novara – 1950–53
- Jonas Rouhi – Juventus – 2024–25

== S ==
- Nils-Åke Sandell – Spal – 1956–58
- Amin Sarr – Verona – 2024–26
- Stefan Schwarz – Fiorentina – 1995–98
- Arne Selmosson – Udinese, Lazio, Roma – 1954–62
- Ken Sema – Udinese – 2019–20
- Stefan Silva – Palermo – 2016–17
- Lennart Skoglund – Inter, Sampdoria, Palermo – 1950–63
- Glenn Strömberg – Atalanta – 1984–87, 1988–92
- Stig Sundqvist – Roma – 1950–53
- Mattias Svanberg – Bologna – 2018–22

== T ==
- Borje Tapper – Genoa – 1950–51
- Jonas Thern – Napoli, Roma – 1992–97
- **Noel Törnqvist** – **Monza** – 2026–

== V ==
- Joel Voelkerling Persson – Lecce – 2022–23

== W ==
- Christian Wilhelmsson – Roma – 2006–07

== Z ==
- Nils Zätterström - Genoa - 2025–26

== See also ==
- List of foreign Serie A players
- Foreign Serie A Footballer of the Year

== Notes ==
1. Born in Iraq
2. Born in Italy
3. Capped for the North Macedonia national under-16 football team
