= Olaf Kobacki =

Polish footballer

Personal information
- Date of birth: 10 July 2001 (age 25)
- Place of birth: Poznań, Poland
- Height: 1.78 m (5 ft 10 in)
- Position: Forward

Team information
- Current team: Wisła Płock
- Number: 7

Youth career
- –2017: Lech Poznań
- 2017–2022: Atalanta

Senior career*
| Years | Team | Apps | (Gls) |
| 2021–2022 | Atalanta | 0 | (0) |
| 2021–2022 | → Arka Gdynia (loan) | 26 | (6) |
| 2022–2024 | Arka Gdynia | 32 | (13) |
| 2022–2023 | → Miedź Legnica (loan) | 24 | (1) |
| 2022 | → Miedź Legnica II (loan) | 1 | (0) |
| 2024–2026 | Sheffield Wednesday | 25 | (0) |
| 2026– | Wisła Płock | 13 | (2) |

International career
| 2016–2017 | Poland U16 | 8 | (0) |
| 2017–2018 | Poland U17 | 15 | (5) |
| 2018–2019 | Poland U18 | 5 | (0) |
| 2021–2022 | Poland U20 | 4 | (0) |
- * Club domestic league appearances and goals as of 18:30, 22 November 2026 (UTC)

Olaf Kobacki (born 10 July 2001) is a Polish professional footballer who plays as a forward for Ekstraklasa club Wisła Płock.

== Club career ==
As a youth player, Kobacki joined the youth academy of Polish side Lech Poznań.

In 2021, he was sent on loan from Italian Serie A club Atalanta to Polish I liga side Arka Gdynia. On 14 August 2021, he made his debut in a 1–0 win over Stomil Olsztyn. On 18 August 2021, Kobacki scored his first 2 goals for the club in a 3–1 win over Widzew Łódź. On 29 April 2022, he joined Arka on a permanent basis, signing a three-year contract.

On 5 July 2022, Kobacki extended his contract with Arka until 2026 and joined Miedź Legnica on a one-year loan.

During the 2023–24 Poland second-tier season, he scored 13 goals in 32 appearances for Arka.

On 3 July 2024, Kobacki joined English club Sheffield Wednesday for an undisclosed fee, signing a four-year contract with the club. He made his Wednesday debut against Plymouth Argyle on 11 August 2024, coming off the bench for Djeidi Gassama in a 4–0 victory. The following season he would pick up a groin injury against Grimsby Town which would rule him out until after the following international break.

On 1 July 2026, Kobacki returned to Poland, joining Ekstraklasa club Wisła Płock for an undisclosed fee, signing a contract until 2028 with a club option to extend his contract.

== Career statistics ==
As of 22 November 2026

Appearances and goals by club, season and competition
| Club | Season | League | | | National cup (Note: Includes Polish Cup, FA Cup) | | League cup (Note: Includes EFL Cup) | | Other | | Total | |
| Club | Season | Division | Apps | Goals | Apps | Goals | Apps | Goals | Apps | Goals | Apps | Goals |
|---|---|---|---|---|---|---|---|---|---|---|---|---|
| Atalanta | 2021–22 | Serie A | 0 | 0 | 0 | 0 | — | | — | | 0 | 0 |
| Arka Gdynia (loan) | 2021–22 | I liga | 26 | 6 | 1 | 0 | — | | 1 (Note: Appearance(s) in I liga promotion play-offs) | 0 | 28 | 6 |
| Arka Gdynia | 2022–23 | I liga | 0 | 0 | 0 | 0 | — | | — | | 0 | 0 |
| Arka Gdynia | 2023–24 | I liga | 32 | 13 | 3 | 1 | — | | 2 | 2 | 37 | 16 |
| Arka Gdynia | Total | | 32 | 13 | 3 | 1 | 0 | 0 | 2 | 2 | 37 | 22 |
| Miedź Legnica (loan) | 2022–23 | Ekstraklasa | 24 | 1 | 1 | 0 | — | | — | | 25 | 1 |
| Sheffield Wednesday | 2024–25 | EFL Championship | 12 | 0 | 1 | 0 | 2 | 0 | — | | 15 | 0 |
| Sheffield Wednesday | 2025–26 | EFL Championship | 13 | 0 | 0 | 0 | 2 | 0 | — | | 15 | 0 |
| Sheffield Wednesday | Total | | 25 | 0 | 1 | 0 | 4 | 0 | 0 | 0 | 30 | 0 |
| Wisła Płock | 2026–27 | Ekstraklasa | 13 | 2 | 1 | 0 | — | | — | | 14 | 2 |
| Career total | | | 120 | 22 | 7 | 1 | 4 | 0 | 3 | 2 | 134 | 25 |

== Honours ==
Individual

- Ekstraklasa Young Player of the Month: September 2022
- I liga Player of the Month: October 2023
- Polish Union of Footballers' I liga Team of the Season: 2023–24
