= Jalon =

Jalon may refer to:

== People ==
- Jalon Calhoun (born 2000), American football player
- Jalon Daniels (born 2002), American football player
- Jalon Linton, a cricketer from the Cayman Islands
- Jalon Walker (born 2004), American football player
- Jalon (biblical figure), a minor biblical figure
- Éric Jalon (born 1971), French civil servant

== Places ==
- Jalón, a municipality in Alicante province, Spain
- Jalón (river), a tributary of the river Ebro in Spain
- Jalón de Cameros, a municipality in La Rioja, Spain

== See also ==
- Jaylon
- Jalen
- Jâlons, a commune in the Marne department, France
