= Jaylen =

Jaylen is a given name. Notable people with the name include:

- Jaylen Adams (born 1996), American basketball player
- Jaylen Bacon (born 1996), American track and field athlete
- Jaylen Barford (born 1996), American basketball player
- Jaylen Barron (born 1997), American actress
- Jaylen Bland (born 1993), American basketball player
- Jaylen Bond (born 1993), American basketball player
- Jaylen Brown (born 1996), American basketball player
- Jaylen Brown (wheelchair basketball) (born 2004), Australian wheelchair basketball player
- Jaylen Clark (born 2001), American basketball player
- Jaylen Crim (born 1998), American soccer player
- Jaylen Hands (born 1999), American basketball player
- Jaylen Harrell (born 2002), American football player
- Jaylen Henderson (born 2003), American football player
- Jaylen Hill (born 1994), American football player
- Jaylen Hoard (born 1999), French-American basketball player
- Jaylen Johnson (born 1996), American basketball player
- Jaylen Johnson (American football) (born 2000), American football player
- Jaylen Key (born 2000), American football player
- Jaylen Mahoney (born 2000), American football player
- Jaylen Martin (born 2004), American basketball player
- Jaylen Mbakwe (born 2005), American football player
- Jaylen McClain (born 2006), American football player
- Jaylen McCollough (born 2000), American football player
- Jaylen Moody (born 1998), American football player
- Jaylen Morris (born 1995), American basketball player
- Jaylen Nowell (born 1999), American basketball player
- Jaylen Raynor (born 2001), American football player
- Jaylen Reed (born 2003), American football player
- Jaylen Robinson or Rob Stone (born 1995), American rapper
- Jaylen Samuels (born 1996), American football player
- Jaylen Sims (born 1998), American basketball player
- Jaylen Smith (disambiguation), multiple people
- Jaylen Sneed (born 2004), American football player
- Jaylen Twyman (born 1999), American football player
- Jaylen Waddle (born 1998), American football player
- Jaylen Warren (born 1998), American football player
- Jaylen Watkins (born 1991), American football player
- Jaylen Watson (born 1998), American football player
- Jaylen Wells (born 2003), American basketball player
- Jaylen Wright (born 2003), American football player
- Jaylen Yearwood (born 2004), Trinidadian footballer

== See also ==
- Jalen, given name and surname
- Jaylin, given name
- Jaylon, given name
- Jayden, given name
