= Jaleen =

Jaleen is a unisex given name, a variant of Jalen, which is an amalgamation of the names James and Leonard. Notable people with the given name include:

- Jaleen Roberts (born 1998), American track and field athlete
- Jaleen Smith (born 1994), American-born Croatian professional basketball player
