= Pierce Charles =

Northern Ireland association football player

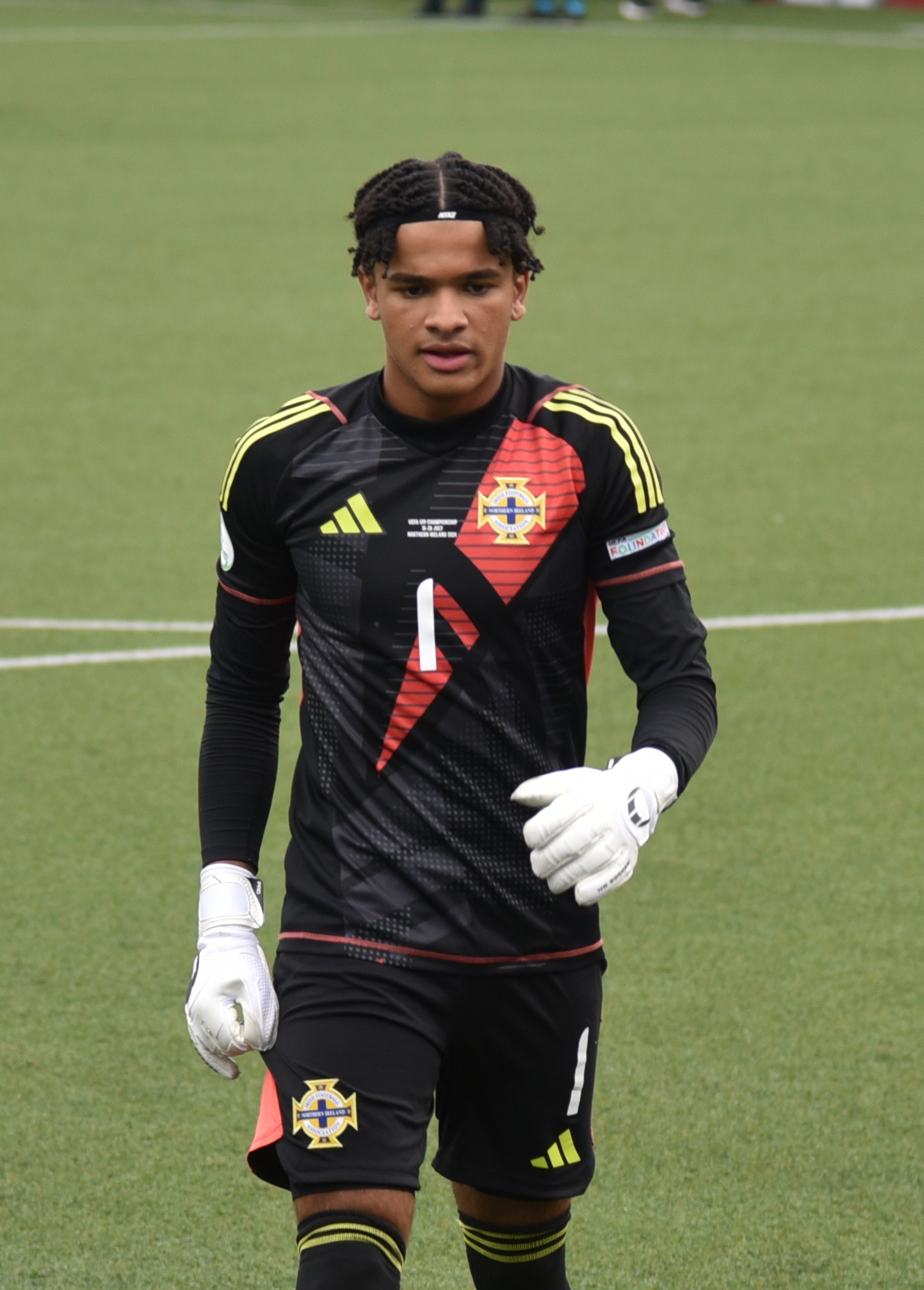
- Pierce Charles playing for Northern Ireland in 2024

Personal information
- Full name: Pierce Joseph Charles
- Date of birth: 21 July 2005 (age 21)
- Place of birth: Manchester, England
- Height: 1.86 m (6 ft 1 in)
- Position: Goalkeeper

Team information
- Current team: Queens Park Rangers (on loan from Manchester City)
- Number: 1

Youth career
- –2021: Manchester City
- 2021–2024: Sheffield Wednesday

Senior career*
Years	Team	Apps	(Gls)
2024–2026	Sheffield Wednesday	27	(0)
2026–	Manchester City	0	(0)
2026–	→ Queens Park Rangers (loan)	16	(0)

International career^{‡}
2021	Northern Ireland U17	2	(0)
2023–2024	Northern Ireland U19	7	(0)
2024	Northern Ireland U21	4	(0)
2024–	Northern Ireland	18	(0)
- * Club domestic league appearances and goals as of 14:30, 21 November 2026 (UTC) ‡ National team caps and goals as of 00:10, 18 November 2026 (UTC)

Pierce Joseph Charles (born 21 July 2005) is a professional footballer who plays as a goalkeeper for EFL Championship club Queens Park Rangers on loan from Premier League club Manchester City. Born in England, he plays for the Northern Ireland national team.

== Club career ==
=== Sheffield Wednesday ===
Charles was in the youth set-up at Manchester City prior to joining up with Sheffield Wednesday in 2021. From the age of 16 years–old he began to train occasionally with the Sheffield Wednesday first team during the 2021–22 season and was subsequently included in the senior squad summer training camps in 2022. In October 2022, he signed a three–year professional contract with the club. On 25 January 2024, manager Danny Röhl confirmed Charles would make his debut in the FA Cup against Coventry City, due to the injury of senior goalkeeper Cameron Dawson and cup-tied James Beadle. On his senior debut, Wednesday drew 1–1 with Coventry. Following the end of the 2023–24 season, Charles signed a new contract with the club.

He made his league debut on 29 March 2025, playing the full game in a 1–1 draw against Cardiff City. After the game, manager Danny Röhl said the club have "two number ones now" suggesting Charles would be number 1 with James Beadle for the remainder of the season. He played six times in April, winning the club's player of the month award for that month, with his composure in possession and shot-stopping abilities being highlighted.

Ahead of the 2025–26 season, he was handed the number 1 shirt. After starting the first 3 games of the season, Charles picked up a shoulder injury which would require surgery, resulting in a spell on the sidelines. He made his league return against Blackburn Rovers in December, however the game was abandoned due to rain. In January 2026, Charles picked up another shoulder injury in the FA Cup game against Brentford, the opposite shoulder which required surgery earlier in the season. It was expected that this injury would see him out for a further two months of the season. On 7 March, Charles returned to the starting lineup for the first time since January against Derby County.

=== Manchester City ===
On 10 July 2026, Charles returned to Manchester City five years after leaving the club. He signed a five-year deal for an undisclosed fee, believed to be initially £3 million, potentially raising to beyond £10 million. He was immediately loaned out to Championship club Queens Park Rangers for the 2026–27 season. He made his QPR debut in the EFL Cup against Millwall, where he would save two penalties in a shootout which they eventually lost.

== International career ==
A Northern Ireland youth international, being eligible via his Northern Irish mother, he made his debut for the Northern Ireland U19 side in March 2023, against Norway U19. He received his first senior Northern Ireland call up on 20 May 2024, subsequently making his senior debut against Belarus on 12 October 2024.

== Personal life ==
His older brother Shea, is also a professional footballer.

== Career statistics ==
=== Club ===
As of 21 November 2026

Appearances and goals by club, season and competition
Club	Season	League			FA Cup		EFL Cup		Other		Total	
Club	Season	Division	Apps	Goals	Apps	Goals	Apps	Goals	Apps	Goals	Apps	Goals
Sheffield Wednesday	2023–24	Championship	0	0	2	0	0	0	—		2	0
Sheffield Wednesday	2024–25	Championship	8	0	1	0	4	0	—		13	0
Sheffield Wednesday	2025–26	Championship	19	0	1	0	1	0	—		21	0
Sheffield Wednesday	Total		27	0	4	0	5	0	—		36	0
Manchester City	2026–27	Premier League	0	0	0	0	0	0	—		0	0
Queens Park Rangers (loan)	2026–27	Championship	16	0	0	0	1	0	—		17	0
Career total			43	0	4	0	6	0	0	0	53	0

=== International ===
As of 17 November 2026

Appearances and goals by national team and year
National team	Year	Apps	Goals
Northern Ireland	2024	4	0
Northern Ireland	2025	4	0
Northern Ireland	2026	10	0
Total		18	0
