= Éric Jalon =

French civil servant (born 1971)

Prefect of Corsica
- Incumbent
- Assumed office 25 August 2025
- Preceded by: Jérôme Filippini

Personal details
- Born: 21 June 1971 (age 54)

Éric Jalon (born 21 June 1971) is a French civil servant who has been serving as prefect of Corsica since 2025. From 2020 to 2022, he served as prefect of Essonne. From 2015 to 2017, he served as prefect of Charente-Maritime. From 2012 to 2015, he served as prefect of Savoie.
