= Jaelen =

Jaelen is a male given name. Notable people with the name include:

- Jaelen Feeney (born 1994), Australian rugby league player
- Jaelen Gill (born 1999), American football player
- Jaelen Strong (born 1994), American football player

== See also ==
- Jaelin
- Jalen
