= Killian Barrett =

Irish association football player (born 2004)

Personal information
- Full name: Killian Robert Barrett
- Date of birth: 15 March 2004 (age 22)
- Place of birth: Sligo, Ireland
- Height: 1.90 m (6 ft 3 in)
- Position: Goalkeeper

Team information
- Current team: Slough Town (on loan from Barrow)

Youth career
- Ballisodare United

Senior career*
| Years | Team | Apps | (Gls) |
- Hartley Wintney
- Woodley United
| 2023–2024 | Binfield | 21 | (0) |
| 2024–2026 | Sheffield Wednesday | 0 | (0) |
| 2024–2025 | → Solihull Moors (loan) | 9 | (0) |
| 2025 | → Rochdale (loan) | 9 | (0) |
| 2025–2026 | → Boston United (loan) | 3 | (0) |
| 2026– | Barrow | 1 | (0) |
| 2026– | → Slough Town (loan) | 0 | (0) |
- * Club domestic league appearances and goals as of 16:13, 2 May 2026 (UTC)

Killian Robert Barrett (born 15 March 2004) is an Irish professional footballer who plays as a goalkeeper for Slough Town, on loan from National League club Barrow.

== Early life ==
From Collooney in County Sligo, he attended Summerhill College and won a Connacht Schools senior cup title with the school in 2020. He played youth football with Ballisodare United, and was part of the Sligo Leitrim Emerging Talent set-up, and then in Mayo's League of Ireland academy. In 2020, he moved to England at the age of 16 years old, having been offered a place at the iDFA Football and Education academy in Reading.

== Club career ==
=== Early career ===
He played non-league football in England as a teenager for Hartley Wintney, Woodley United in the Combined Counties League and Binfield for whom he kept six clean sheets in 21 matches to help keep them in the South Central Division of the Isthmian League during the 2023–24 season, and won Supporters' Player of the Season.

=== Sheffield Wednesday ===
After a brief trial period, he signed for EFL Championship club Sheffield Wednesday in July 2024. He was included on the substitutes bench for the Sheffield Wednesday first-team for the first time for their EFL Cup match against Brentford in October 2024. He joined National League club Solihull Moors on a short-term loan in December 2024. After keeping two clean sheets in his first five matches his loan spell at Solihull Moors was extended for an extra month into 2025. Later that season he featured on loan in the National league for Rochdale, playing for the club in the National League promotion play-offs in May 2025. On 15 November 2025, he joined Boston United on an initial one-month loan deal. His loan was extended in December for another month.

=== Barrow ===
On 12 January 2026, Barrett joined League Two club Barrow, signing an 18-month contract, with the option of a further year for an undisclosed fee.

On 9 October 2026, he joined National League South club Slough Town on a one-month loan deal.

== Personal life ==
His father Adrian was a teacher at Summerhill College in Sligo whilst Barrett was a pupil there. After being scouted playing non-league football by Steve Coppell in Berkshire, he signed with football agent Stephen Hunt, a former player who played under Coppell for Reading.

== International career ==
On 21 May 2025, he received his first call up to the Republic of Ireland U21 side for their June friendly fixtures against Croatia U21 and Qatar U23 in Croatia.

== Career statistics ==
As of 2 May 2026

Appearances and goals by club, season and competition
| Club | Season | League | | | FA Cup | | League Cup | | Other | | Total | |
| Club | Season | Division | Apps | Goals | Apps | Goals | Apps | Goals | Apps | Goals | Apps | Goals |
|---|---|---|---|---|---|---|---|---|---|---|---|---|
| Sheffield Wednesday | 2024–25 | Championship | 0 | 0 | 0 | 0 | 0 | 0 | – | | 0 | 0 |
| Sheffield Wednesday | 2025–26 | Championship | 0 | 0 | 0 | 0 | 0 | 0 | – | | 0 | 0 |
| Sheffield Wednesday | Total | | 0 | 0 | 0 | 0 | 0 | 0 | 0 | 0 | 0 | 0 |
| Solihul Moors (loan) | 2024–25 | National League | 9 | 0 | 0 | 0 | – | | – | | 9 | 0 |
| Rochdale (loan) | 2024–25 | National League | 9 | 0 | 0 | 0 | – | | 1 (Note: Appearance in the National League play-offs.) | 0 | 10 | 0 |
| Boston United (loan) | 2025–26 | National League | 3 | 0 | – | | – | | 1 (Note: Appearance in the FA Trophy.) | 0 | 4 | 0 |
| Barrow | 2025–26 | League Two | 1 | 0 | – | | – | | – | | 1 | 0 |
| Career total | | | 22 | 0 | 0 | 0 | 0 | 0 | 2 | 0 | 24 | 0 |
