= 2024–25 Sheffield Wednesday F.C. season =

English football club season

Sheffield Wednesday
2024–25 season
- Owner: Dejphon Chansiri
- Manager: Danny Röhl
- Stadium: Hillsborough Stadium
- Championship: 12th
- FA Cup: Third round (vs Coventry City)
- EFL Cup: Fourth round (vs Brentford)
- Top goalscorer: League: Josh Windass (13); All: Josh Windass (13)
- Highest home attendance: 33,827 (vs Sheffield United; Championship)
- Lowest home attendance: 22,452 (vs Swansea City; Championship)
- Average home league attendance: 26,636
- Biggest win: 5–1 (vs Grimsby Town; EFL Cup)
- Biggest defeat: 2–6 (vs Watford; Championship)
Home colours	Away colours	Third colours

The 2024–25 season was the 157th season in the existence of Sheffield Wednesday, and the club's second consecutive season in the Championship. In addition to the domestic league, the club also competed in the FA Cup and the EFL Cup.

== Season overview ==
=== June ===
On 14 June, coach Chris Powell was awarded an MBE for his services to football.

On 29 June, Niklas Lanwehr joined the club as a performance analyst.

=== July ===
On 11 July, Pierce Charles was called up to the Northern Ireland U19 squad for the 2024 UEFA European Under-19 Championship.

On 17 July, the club was fined £12,500 by The Football Association for fan conduct in the Championship fixture against Coventry City the previous season.

=== August ===
On 6 August, Wednesday announced their new first year scholars of; Aodhan Sopala, Charlie Hobbs, Daniel Da Costa, Liam Clayton, Kailen Hatfield and Jacob Jessop.

On 22 August, Pierce Charles was called up to the Northern Ireland U21 squad.

On 29 August, Shea Charles was called up for the Northern Ireland squad.

On 30 August, James Beadle was called up for the England U21 squad.

On 30 August, Ben King joined the first team staff from Accrington Stanley.

On 30 August, Di'Shon Bernard was called up to the Jamaica squad.

On 30 August, Will Grainger was called up to the Wales U17 squad.

=== September ===
On 2 September, Jamal Lowe was called up to the Jamaica squad.

On 26 September, it was confirmed the kick-off time for the Steel City derby was pushed back so fans can mark their respects on Remembrance Sunday.

On 26 September, Danny Röhl confirmed performance analyst Niklas Lanwehr had left the club, whilst Andy Parslow had joined the club as the new set piece coach.

=== October ===
On 3 October, Pierce and Shea Charles were called up for the Northern Ireland squad.

On 4 October, James Beadle was called up for the England U21 squad.

On 4 October, Di'Shon Bernard was called up to the Jamaica squad.

On 10 October, Di'Shon Bernard withdrew from the Jamaica squad.

On 31 October, the club were placed under a registration embargo by the EFL over amounts owed to HM Revenue and Customs.

=== November ===
On 5 November, Pierce and Shea Charles were called up for the Northern Ireland squad.

On 7 November, Gabriel Otegbayo was called up to the Republic of Ireland U21 squad.

On 8 November, James Beadle was called up for the England U21 squad.

On 9 November, Di'Shon Bernard was called up to the Jamaica squad.

On 14 November, the tax bill was paid to HM Revenue and Customs and were removed from the registration embargo by the EFL.

On 14 November, the club announced that Academy Manager Steve Haslam would be departing the club.

=== December ===
On 20 December, Jonathan Pepper was confirmed as the new Academy Manager.

On 28 December, the club published their annual accounts for the year ending 31 July 2024.

=== January ===
On 29 January, the club confirmed they appointed Lee Jackson as the new Head Groundsperson the previous week.

=== February ===
On 18 February, Will Grainger was called up to the Wales U19 squad.

On 18 February, Caelan Cadamarteri was called up to the Scotland U16 squad.

=== March ===
On 11 March, Pierce and Shea Charles were called up for the Northern Ireland squad.

On 11 March, Will Grainger was called up to the Wales U17 squad.

On 13 March, Gabriel Otegbayo was called up to the Republic of Ireland U21 squad.

On 14 March, James Beadle was called up for the England U21 squad.

On 31 March, the club failed to pay their players' wages for March due to cashflow problems by owner Dejphon Chansiri.

=== April ===
On 7 April, the club confirmed the outstanding wages to players and staff had been made.

=== May ===
On 3 May, Josh Windass became the clubs leading goalscorer in the 21st century, overtaking Marcus Tudgay with 53 goals.

On 15 May, the club announced their retained list following the end of the season.

On 16 May, the club announced their academy retained list following the end of the season.

On 19 May, Wednesday announced their new first year scholars of; Yisa Alao, Jack Barraclough, Harry Chadbourne, Kleven De Oliveira, Noah Dixon, Will Grainger, James Kay, Perry Ridge, Charlie Robinson, Reuben Selby, Thomas Streets.

On 21 May, Killian Barrett and Gabriel Otegbayo were called up to the Republic of Ireland U21 squad.

On 22 May, Pierce Charles were called up for the Northern Ireland squad.

On 25 May, Yan Valery was called up for the Tunisia squad.

On 30 May, it was revealed that players and staff hadn't been paid for a second time in three months.

== Kits ==
Wednesday confirmed their new home strip for the 2024–25 season on 24 June, whilst their away kit was confirmed on 2 July. On 9 August, Wednesday confirmed their season squad numbers. as well as 'Mr Vegas' being their back of shirt sponsor for the season. On 14 August, Wednesday confirmed their third strip for the 2024–25 season. They played with the Chansiri front of shirt sponsor, until the 18 October, when Mockba Modular replaced it.

Home	Away	Third	Home alt	Away alt 1	Away alt 2	Third alt

== First-team squad ==
As of 28 May 2025

No.	Player	Position	Nationality	Place of birth	Date of birth (age)	Signed from	Date signed	Fee	Contract end
Goalkeepers
1	James Beadle	GK	(England)	Bexley	16 July 2004 (age 22)	Brighton & Hove Albion	4 July 2024	Loan	31 May 2025
26	Ben Hamer	GK	(England)	Chard	20 November 1987 (age 38)	Watford	1 July 2024	Free Transfer	30 June 2025
47	Pierce Charles	GK	(Northern Ireland)	Manchester	21 July 2005 (age 21)	Manchester City	14 October 2022	Free Transfer	30 June 2027
Defenders
2	Liam Palmer	RB	(Scotland)	Worksop	19 September 1991 (age 35)	Academy	1 July 2010	—N/a	30 June 2026
3	Max Lowe	LB	(England)	South Normanton	11 May 1997 (age 29)	Sheffield United	1 July 2024	Free Transfer	30 June 2026
5	Di'Shon Bernard	CB	(Jamaica)	Wandsworth	14 October 2000 (age 26)	Manchester United	31 July 2023	Free Transfer	30 June 2027
6	Dominic Iorfa	CB	(England)	Southend-on-Sea	24 June 1995 (age 31)	Wolverhampton Wanderers	31 January 2019	Undisclosed	30 June 2026
14	Pol Valentín	RB	(Spain)	Avinyonet de Puigventós	21 February 1997 (age 29)	Sporting Gijón	27 July 2023	Undisclosed	30 June 2025
18	Marvin Johnson	LB	(England)	Birmingham	1 December 1990 (age 35)	Middlesbrough	5 August 2021	Free Transfer	30 June 2025
20	Michael Ihiekwe	CB	(England)	Liverpool	20 November 1992 (age 33)	Rotherham United	1 July 2022	Free Transfer	30 June 2025
23	Akin Famewo	CB	(England)	Lewisham	9 November 1998 (age 28)	Norwich City	6 July 2022	Undisclosed	30 June 2025
27	Yan Valery	RB	(Tunisia)	Champigny-sur-Marne	22 February 1999 (age 27)	Angers	21 June 2024	Undisclosed	30 June 2027
28	Ryō Hatsuse	LB	(Japan)	Kishiwada	10 July 1997 (age 29)	Vissel Kobe	6 February 2025	Free Transfer	30 June 2025
33	Gabriel Otegbayo	CB	(Republic of Ireland)	Cork	11 February 2005 (age 21)	Burnley	1 March 2024	Free Transfer	30 June 2026
Midfielders
4	Nathaniel Chalobah	DM	(England)	Freetown	12 December 1994 (age 31)	West Bromwich Albion	13 July 2024	Free Transfer	30 June 2026
8	Svante Ingelsson	CM	(Sweden)	Kalmar	14 June 1998 (age 28)	Hansa Rostock	1 July 2024	Free Transfer	30 June 2026
10	Barry Bannan	CM	(Scotland)	Airdrie	1 December 1989 (age 36)	Crystal Palace	31 August 2015	Undisclosed	30 June 2025
40	Stuart Armstrong	CM	(Scotland)	Inverness	30 March 1992 (age 34)	Vancouver Whitecaps	31 January 2025	Undisclosed	30 June 2025
44	Shea Charles	DM	(Northern Ireland)	Manchester	5 November 2003 (age 23)	Southampton	27 August 2024	Loan	31 May 2025
Forwards
9	Jamal Lowe	RW	(Jamaica)	Harrow	21 July 1994 (age 32)	AFC Bournemouth	1 July 2024	Free Transfer	30 June 2026
11	Josh Windass	SS	(England)	Kingston upon Hull	9 January 1994 (age 32)	Wigan Athletic	2 September 2020	Undisclosed	30 June 2026
12	Iké Ugbo	CF	(Canada)	Lewisham	21 September 1998 (age 28)	Troyes	8 August 2024	Undisclosed	30 June 2028
13	Callum Paterson	CF	(Scotland)	London	13 October 1994 (age 32)	Cardiff City	30 September 2020	Undisclosed	30 June 2025
16	Ibrahim Cissoko	LW	(Netherlands)	Nijmegen	26 March 2003 (age 23)	Toulouse	1 February 2025	Loan	31 May 2025
17	Charlie McNeill	CF	(England)	Droylsden	9 September 2003 (age 23)	Manchester United	10 July 2024	Free Transfer	30 June 2027
19	Olaf Kobacki	LW	(Poland)	Poznań	10 July 2001 (age 25)	Arka Gdynia	3 July 2024	Undisclosed	30 June 2028
24	Michael Smith	CF	(England)	Wallsend	17 October 1991 (age 35)	Rotherham United	1 July 2022	Free Transfer	30 June 2026
39	Favour Onukwuli	LW	(England)		9 April 2005 (age 21)	Volenti Academy	30 January 2023	Free Transfer	30 June 2026
41	Djeidi Gassama	LW	(France)	Nieleba Haouisse	10 September 2003 (age 23)	Paris Saint-Germain	15 August 2023	Undisclosed	30 June 2026
45	Anthony Musaba	RW	(Netherlands)	Beuningen	6 December 2000 (age 25)	Monaco	3 August 2023	Undisclosed	30 June 2026
Out on loan
7	Mallik Wilks	RW	(England)	Leeds	15 December 1998 (age 27)	Hull City	22 August 2022	Undisclosed	30 June 2025
30	Sean Fusire	CM	(Zimbabwe)	Sheffield	31 May 2005 (age 21)	Academy	9 December 2022	—N/a	30 June 2027
31	Rio Shipston	CM	(England)	Sheffield	7 November 2004 (age 22)	Academy	14 December 2022	—N/a	30 June 2026
32	Sam Reed	LB	(England)	Sheffield	27 March 2003 (age 23)	Brighouse Town	20 July 2023	Free Transfer	30 June 2025
34	Killian Barrett	GK	(Republic of Ireland)	Ballisodare	15 March 2004 (age 22)	Binfield	31 July 2024	Free Transfer	30 June 2026
36	Mackenzie Maltby	CB	(England)	Chesterfield	4 December 2004 (age 21)	Academy	1 July 2023	—N/a	30 June 2026
42	Bailey Cadamarteri	CF	(England)	Leeds	9 May 2005 (age 21)	Academy	8 June 2022	—N/a	30 June 2028
46	Jack Hall	GK	(England)	Worksop	10 October 2004 (age 22)	Academy	14 October 2021	—N/a	30 June 2025

== Pre-season and friendlies ==
The club announced their first friendly against Alfreton Town as well as two training camps in St George's Park and in Germany on 18 June. On 1 July, Wednesday confirmed a testimonial match for Liam Palmer against CD Leganés. On 28 June, the players reported back for pre-season training. On 8 July, the club confirmed two friendlies in Austria during their training camp in Germany, against RB Salzburg and Werder Bremen.

6 July 2024 Friendly	Alfreton Town	0–2	Sheffield Wednesday	Alfreton
13:00 BST		Report	Windass 33'; Wilks 51'	Stadium: Impact Arena
Note: Fixture was initially scheduled for a 15:00 kick-off, but was moved to allow supporters sufficient time after the game to watch England in UEFA Euro 2024.

17 July 2024 Friendly	Brighton & Hove Albion	3–0	Sheffield Wednesday
		Report		Attendance: Behind closed doors

20 July 2024 Friendly	RB Salzburg	4–0	Sheffield Wednesday	Wals-Siezenheim, Austria
15:00 BST	Dedić 11'; Kjærgaard 34'; Konaté 59'; Daghim 64'	Report		Stadium: Red Bull Arena; Attendance: 0 (Played behind closed doors)

26 July 2024 Friendly	Werder Bremen	2–2	Sheffield Wednesday	Zell am Ziller, Austria
14:00 BST	Kownacki 31'; Topp 49'	Report	Musaba 83'; Gassama 97'	Stadium: Parkstadion; Attendance: 1,800
Note: Fixture was played as four 30 minute sessions.

3 August 2024 Friendly	Sheffield Wednesday	0–0	CD Leganés	Sheffield
13:00 BST		Report		Stadium: Hillsborough Stadium

== Competitions ==
=== EFL Championship ===
==== League table ====
Pos	Team	Pld	W	D	L	GF	GA	GD	Pts
10	Middlesbrough	46	18	10	18	64	56	+8	64
11	Swansea City	46	17	10	19	51	56	−5	61
12	Sheffield Wednesday	46	15	13	18	60	69	−9	58
13	Norwich City	46	14	15	17	71	68	+3	57
14	Watford	46	16	9	21	53	61	−8	57

Source: English Football League
Rules for classification: 1) Points; 2) Goal difference; 3) Number of goals scored; 4) Head-to-head results; 5) Wins; 6) Away goals; 7) Penalty points (sec 9.5); 8) Number of 12-point sending off offences; 9) Play-off (only if needed to determine promotion/relegation)

==== Results summary ====
Overall								Home						Away					
Pld	W	D	L	GF	GA	GD	Pts	W	D	L	GF	GA	GD	W	D	L	GF	GA	GD
46	15	13	18	60	69	−9	58	6	8	9	30	32	−2	9	5	9	30	37	−7

Last updated: 3 May 2025.
Source: Soccerway

==== Results by round ====
Round	1	2	3	4	5	6	7	8	9	10	11	12	13	14	15	16	17	18	19	20	21	22	23	24	25	26	27	28	29	30	31	32	33	34	35	36	37	38	39	40	41	42	43	44	45	46
Ground	H	A	H	A	H	A	H	A	A	H	H	A	H	H	A	H	A	A	H	H	A	H	A	A	H	H	A	H	A	H	A	A	H	A	H	A	A	H	A	H	A	H	A	H	H	A
Result	W	L	L	L	D	L	W	D	W	L	D	W	L	W	L	D	W	W	D	L	W	W	D	L	W	D	L	D	W	D	L	W	L	L	L	W	W	L	D	L	D	L	L	W	D	D
Position	1	9	16	20	20	22	18	19	15	18	18	13	18	15	15	15	13	12	9	12	9	9	9	11	9	10	10	11	10	10	11	8	9	12	13	13	11	12	12	13	13	14	15	13	12	12
Points	3	3	3	3	4	4	7	8	11	11	12	15	15	18	18	19	22	25	26	26	29	32	33	33	36	37	37	38	41	42	42	45	45	45	45	48	51	51	52	52	53	53	53	56	57	58

Source: EFL
A = Away; H = Home; W = Win; D = Draw; L = Loss; P = Postponed

==== Matches ====
On 26 June, the EFL Championship fixtures were released.

11 August 2024 1	Sheffield Wednesday	4–0	Plymouth Argyle	Sheffield
16:00 BST	J. Lowe 35', (yellow card) 45'; Galloway 52' (o.g.); Windass 82'; Smith 90+6'	Report	Cissoko (yellow card) 45+2'	Stadium: Hillsborough Stadium; Attendance: 29,535; Referee: Lewis Smith
Note: Live on Sky Sports

18 August 2024 2	Sunderland	4–0	Sheffield Wednesday	Sunderland
12:00 BST	Cirkin 11'; Mayenda 15', 47'; O'Nien 24'	Report	Ingelsson (yellow card) 26'; Bernard (yellow card) 82'; Palmer (yellow card) 85'	Stadium: Stadium of Light; Attendance: 40,022; Referee: Dean Whitestone
Note: Live on Sky Sports

23 August 2024 3	Sheffield Wednesday	0–2	Leeds United	Sheffield
20:00 BST	Bernard (yellow card) 54'; Iorfa (yellow card) 85'	Report	Aaronson 24'; Gnonto (yellow card) 28'; James 48', (yellow card) 48'; Ampadu (yellow card) 82'	Stadium: Hillsborough Stadium; Attendance: 28,800; Referee: Simon Hooper
Note: Live on Sky Sports

31 August 2024 4	Millwall	3–0	Sheffield Wednesday	Bermondsey
15:00 BST	Tangaga (yellow card) 43'; Coburn 58'; Watmore 71'; Esse (yellow card) 82'; Cooper 88'	Report	Bannan (yellow card) 61'	Stadium: The Den; Attendance: 14,905; Referee: Leigh Doughty

14 September 2024 5	Sheffield Wednesday	1–1	Queens Park Rangers	Sheffield
15:00 BST	Bannan 90+3'	Report	Field (yellow card) 22'; Dunne (yellow card) 25'; Dembele (yellow card) 70'; Lloyd 90+6'	Stadium: Hillsborough Stadium; Attendance: 26,283; Referee: Oliver Langford

21 September 2024 6	Luton Town	2–1	Sheffield Wednesday	Luton
15:00 BST	Morris 77' (pen.), 88'; Burke (yellow card) 80'	Report	Bannan 52'; Bernard (yellow card) 67' (red card) 74'; Ingelsson (yellow card) 71'	Stadium: Kenilworth Road; Attendance: 11,805; Referee: Gavin Ward

28 September 2024 7	Sheffield Wednesday	3–2	West Bromwich Albion	Sheffield
12:30 BST	Furlong 9' (o.g.); Windass 23' (yellow card) 27'; Valery (yellow card) 38'; Famewo (yellow card) 57'; Bannan (yellow card) 60'; Smith (yellow card) 72'; Musaba 86'; Beadle (yellow card) 90+1'	Report	Račić (yellow card) 59'; Maja 65'; Swift (yellow card) 70'; Diangana (yellow card) 77'; Mowatt 84'	Stadium: Hillsborough Stadium; Attendance: 26,308; Referee: Ben Toner
Note: Live on Sky Sports

2 October 2024 8	Bristol City	0–0	Sheffield Wednesday	Bristol
20:00 BST	Williams (yellow card) 48'; Sykes (yellow card) 82'	Report	Windass (yellow card) 36'	Stadium: Ashton Gate; Attendance: 20,293; Referee: Anthony Backhouse
Note: Live on Sky Sports

5 October 2024 9	Coventry City	1–2	Sheffield Wednesday	Coventry
15:00 BST	Rudoni 26'; Bidwell (yellow card) 38'; Sheaf (yellow card) 43'; Eccles (yellow card) 45'; Thomas-Asante (yellow card) 87'	Report	Gassama 45+2'; S. Charles (yellow card) 77', (goal) 90+3'; Famewo (yellow card) 87'; Valery (yellow card) 89'	Stadium: Coventry Building Society Arena; Attendance: 28,571; Referee: Dean Whitestone

19 October 2024 10	Sheffield Wednesday	0–2	Burnley	Sheffield
15:00 BST	S. Charles (yellow card) 65'	Report	Anthony 37'; Brownhill 50'; Koleosho (yellow card) 55'; Sarmiento (yellow card) 87'	Stadium: Hillsborough Stadium; Attendance: 28,105; Referee: Michael Salisbury

22 October 2024 11	Sheffield Wednesday	0–0	Swansea City	Sheffield
19:45 BST		Report	Ronald (yellow card) 7'; Fulton (yellow card) 66'; Darling (yellow card) 87'; Peart-Harris (yellow card) 90+4'	Stadium: Hillsborough Stadium; Attendance: 22,452; Referee: Matt Donohue

25 October 2024 12	Portsmouth	1–2	Sheffield Wednesday	Portsmouth
20:00 BST	Ogilvie 44'; Lang (yellow card) 72'	Report	Bernard (yellow card) 42'; Windass 54'; Smith 71'; Palmer (yellow card) 79'; Valery (yellow card) 87'	Stadium: Fratton Park; Attendance: 20,262; Referee: Tim Robinson
Note: Live on Sky Sports

2 November 2024 13	Sheffield Wednesday	2–6	Watford	Sheffield
15:00 GMT	Smith (yellow card) 26', (goal) 34'; Iorfa (yellow card) 57'; Valentín 82'; J. Lowe (yellow card) 83'	Report	Porteous (yellow card) 25', (goal) 29'; Pollock (yellow card) 42'; Ince 52' (pen.); Bayo 58' (pen.), 67', 85', 88'	Stadium: Hillsborough Stadium; Attendance: 25,693; Referee: Sam Allison

5 November 2024 14	Sheffield Wednesday	2–0	Norwich City	Sheffield
19:45 GMT	Windass 12'; Iorfa 34'	Report		Stadium: Hillsborough Stadium; Attendance: 22,731; Referee: Stephen Martin

10 November 2024 15	Sheffield United	1–0	Sheffield Wednesday	Sheffield
12:30 GMT	Burrows (yellow card) 26'; Campbell 50'	Report	Bannan (yellow card) 41'; Valery (yellow card) 57'; S. Charles (yellow card) 90'	Stadium: Bramall Lane; Attendance: 31,127; Referee: Lewis Smith
Note: Live on Sky Sports

23 November 2024 16	Sheffield Wednesday	1–1	Cardiff City	Sheffield
12:30 GMT	Bernard 36'	Report	Tanner 34'; Siopis (yellow card) 85'	Stadium: Hillsborough Stadium; Attendance: 23,974; Referee: Andrew Kitchen
Note: Live on Sky Sports

26 November 2024 17	Hull City	0–2	Sheffield Wednesday	Kingston upon Hull
19:45 GMT	Hughes (yellow card) 45+3'	Report	Windass 37' (pen.); Ugbo (yellow card) 45+3'; Bernard (yellow card) 69'; Smith 84'	Stadium: MKM Stadium; Attendance: 21,297; Referee: Oliver Langford
Note: Live on Sky Sports

1 December 2024 18	Derby County	1–2	Sheffield Wednesday	Derby
15:00 GMT	Adams 9', (yellow card) 37'; Harness (yellow card) 47'; Osborn (yellow card) 71'; Elder (yellow card) 85'; Jackson (yellow card) 90+5'	Report	Bannan (yellow card) 21', (goal) 64'; J. Lowe 90+4'	Stadium: Pride Park Stadium; Attendance: 29,212; Referee: John Busby
Note: Live on Sky Sports

7 December 2024 19	Sheffield Wednesday	1–1	Preston North End	Sheffield
12:30 GMT	Palmer (yellow card) 36'; Windass (penalty missed) 53'; S. Charles (yellow card) 69'; Johnson (yellow card) 70'; Smith 76'; Chalobah (yellow card) 78'	Report	Riis 14'; McCann (yellow card) 63'; Þórðarson (yellow card) 80'	Stadium: Hillsborough Stadium; Attendance: 23,927; Referee: Robert Madley
Note: Live on Sky Sports

10 December 2024 20	Sheffield Wednesday	0–1	Blackburn Rovers	Sheffield
19:45 GMT		Report	Gueye 68'; Cantwell (yellow card) 84'; Travis (yellow card) 90+4'	Stadium: Hillsborough Stadium; Attendance: 22,703; Referee: Josh Smith
Note: Live on Sky Sports

14 December 2024 21	Oxford United	1–3	Sheffield Wednesday	Littlemore
15:00 GMT	Leigh 17'	Report	Windass 28'; J. Lowe 49'; Gassama 61', (yellow card) 72'	Stadium: Kassam Stadium; Referee: Stephen Martin

21 December 2024 22	Sheffield Wednesday	2–0	Stoke City	Sheffield
12:30 GMT	Bernard (yellow card) 31' (yellow-red card) 41'; S. Charles (yellow card) 36'; Windass 52'; Paterson 76'; M. Lowe (yellow card) 81'	Report	Koumas (yellow card) 38'; Tchamadeu (yellow card) 74'; Cannon (penalty missed) 82'	Stadium: Hillsborough Stadium; Attendance: 26,743; Referee: Sam Allison
Note: Live on Sky Sports

26 December 2024 23	Middlesbrough	3–3	Sheffield Wednesday	Middlesbrough
15:00 GMT	Doak 5'; Azaz 15', 30' van den Berg (yellow card) 39' (yellow-red card) 56'	Report	Ingelsson 47'; Windass 54'; Valery 61', (yellow card) 71'; Gassama (yellow card) 78'	Stadium: Riverside Stadium; Attendance: 32,147; Referee: Anthony Backhouse
Note: Live on Sky Sports

29 December 2024 24	Preston North End	3–1	Sheffield Wednesday	Preston
12:30 GMT	Riis 29', 79'; Greenwood 64' (pen.); Holmes (yellow card) 85'; Frøkjær-Jensen (yellow card) 90+7'	Report	Windass 59'	Stadium: Deepdale; Attendance: 19,950; Referee: Sunny Gill
Note: Live on Sky Sports

1 January 2025 25	Sheffield Wednesday	4–2	Derby County	Sheffield
15:00 GMT	Bannan 8'; Windass 61'; Gassama 63'; Musaba 74'; S. Charles (yellow card) 85'	Report	Adams (yellow card) 32', (goal) 90+1'; Goudmijn (yellow card) 34'; Yates 68'	Stadium: Hillsborough Stadium; Attendance: 31,056; Referee: Lewis Smith
Note: Live on Sky Sports

4 January 2025 26	Sheffield Wednesday	2–2	Millwall	Sheffield
15:00 GMT	Valery 6'; Ugbo (penalty missed) 42'; Bannan (yellow card) 64'; Otegbayo 85'	Report	Leonard (yellow card) 23'; Azeez (yellow card) 60'; Saville (yellow card) 62'; Honeyman 65'; Wintle 83'	Stadium: Hillsborough Stadium; Attendance: 25,208; Referee: Robert Jones

19 January 2025 27	Leeds United	3–0	Sheffield Wednesday	Beeston
12:00 GMT	Solomon 3'; Bogle (yellow card) 68'; Ramazani 88'; Tanaka 90+6'	Report	S. Charles (yellow card) 64'; Bernard (yellow card) 90+3'	Stadium: Elland Road; Attendance: 36,685; Referee: David Webb
Note: Live on Sky Sports & ITV

22 January 2025 28	Sheffield Wednesday	2–2	Bristol City	Sheffield
19:45 GMT	Gassama 16'; S. Charles (yellow card) 27'; Bernard 53'; Valentín (yellow card) 78'	Report	Twine (yellow card) 27'; Wells 51'; Vyner (yellow card) 57'; McCrorie 86'	Stadium: Hillsborough Stadium; Attendance: 22,774; Referee: James Linington
Note: Live on Sky Sports

25 January 2025 29	Queens Park Rangers	0–2	Sheffield Wednesday	Shepherd's Bush
15:00 GMT	Chair (yellow card) 46'; Smyth (yellow card) 68'	Report	Smith 72'; Valery (yellow card) 80'; Paterson 88'	Stadium: MATRADE Loftus Road Stadium; Attendance: 17,352; Referee: Sam Allison

1 February 2025 30	Sheffield Wednesday	1–1	Luton Town	Sheffield
15:00 GMT	Smith 60' (pen.); Bernard (yellow card) 75'	Report	Doughty 31'; Kaminski (yellow card) 67'	Stadium: Hillsborough Stadium; Attendance: 27,437; Referee: Ben Toner

8 February 2025 31	West Bromwich Albion	2–1	Sheffield Wednesday	West Bromwich
12:30 GMT	Armstrong 74'; Furlong (yellow card) 84'; Molumby 90+6', (yellow card) 90+7'; Bartley (red card) 90+9'	Report	Valentín (yellow card) 78'; Windass (yellow card) 81'; Paterson 90+3'; Ihiekwe (yellow card) 90+9'	Stadium: The Hawthorns; Attendance: 25,452; Referee: Tom Nield
Note: Live on Sky Sports

12 February 2025 32	Swansea City	0–1	Sheffield Wednesday	Landore
19:45 GMT		Report	Smith 66'; Cissoko (yellow card) 89'; Chalobah (yellow card) 90'	Stadium: Swansea.com Stadium; Attendance: 14,149; Referee: Elliot Bell
Note: Live on Sky Sports

15 February 2025 33	Sheffield Wednesday	1–2	Coventry City	Sheffield
15:00 GMT	Latibeaudiere 62' (o.g.)	Report	Simms 16', 90+2', (yellow card) 83'	Stadium: Hillsborough Stadium; Attendance: 28,121; Referee: Josh Smith

21 February 2025 34	Burnley	4–0	Sheffield Wednesday	Burnley
20:00 GMT	Lucas Pires (yellow card) 30'; Edwards 43'; Brownhill 62'; Laurent (yellow card) 64'; Roberts 70'; Benson 90+5', (yellow card) 90+6'	Report	Johnson (yellow card) 17'; Windass (yellow card) 42'; S. Charles (yellow card) 50'; Gassama (yellow card) 79'	Stadium: Turf Moor; Attendance: 20,675; Referee: Stephen Martin
Note: Live on Sky Sports

28 February 2025 35	Sheffield Wednesday	1–2	Sunderland	Sheffield
20:00 GMT	Paterson 48'; Hatsuse (yellow card) 52'	Report	Mayenda 34', 71', (yellow card) 72'	Stadium: Hillsborough Stadium; Attendance: 27,954; Referee: Will Finnie
Note: Live on Sky Sports

8 March 2025 36	Plymouth Argyle	0–3	Sheffield Wednesday	Plymouth
15:00 GMT	Pleguezuelo (yellow card) 38'; Katić (yellow card) 51'; Gyabi (yellow card) 75'	Report	Ogbeta 15' (o.g.); Windass (yellow card) 24'; M. Lowe (yellow card) 29'; Beadle (yellow card) 31'; Bannan (yellow card) 32'; Paterson 41'; Gassama 68'; Kobacki (yellow card) 79'	Stadium: Home Park; Attendance: 16,981; Referee: Oliver Langford

11 March 2025 37	Norwich City	2–3	Sheffield Wednesday	Norwich
19:45 GMT	Sainz 16'; Crnac 35'	Report	Valentín (yellow card) 29'; Ihiekwe (yellow card) 42', (goal) 64'; Chalobah (yellow card) 57'; Windass 72', (yellow card) 78'; Gassama 76'	Stadium: Carrow Road; Attendance: 25,498; Referee: Ben Speedie
Note: Live on Sky Sports

16 March 2025 38	Sheffield Wednesday	0–1	Sheffield United	Sheffield
12:30 GMT	Paterson (yellow card) 18'; Gassama (yellow card) 59'; Johnson (yellow card) 86'	Report	Brereton Díaz (yellow card) 18'; Seriki (yellow card) 56'; Brewster 64'; Ahmedhodžić (yellow card) 89'	Stadium: Hillsborough Stadium; Attendance: 33,827; Referee: Andrew Kitchen
Note: Live on Sky Sports

29 March 2025 39	Cardiff City	1–1	Sheffield Wednesday	Leckwith
15:00 GMT	O'Dowda (yellow card) 4'; Davies 21', (yellow card) 76'	Report	Ihiekwe 61'; S. Charles (yellow card) 76'	Stadium: Cardiff City Stadium; Referee: Sam Allison

5 April 2025 40	Sheffield Wednesday	0–1	Hull City	Sheffield
15:00 BST	Bannan (yellow card) 87'; Iorfa (yellow card) 90+3'	Report	Coyle (yellow card) 88'; Hughes 90+4'	Stadium: Hillsborough Stadium; Attendance: 27,342; Referee: Oliver Langford

8 April 2025 41	Blackburn Rovers	2–2	Sheffield Wednesday	Blackburn
19:45 BST	Hyam (yellow card) 23'; Dolan 51'; Ōhashi (yellow card) 73', (goal) 85'; Travis (yellow card) 82'	Report	Valery 16'; Gassama 38'; Valentín (yellow card) 44'; Ingelsson (yellow card) 71'; P. Charles (yellow card) 73'; Windass (yellow card) 86'	Stadium: Ewood Park; Attendance: 15,575; Referee: Will Finnie
Note: Live on Sky Sports

12 April 2025 42	Sheffield Wednesday	0–1	Oxford United	Sheffield
15:00 BST	Windass (yellow card) 83'	Report	Harris (yellow card) 74'; Long 79'; Phillips (yellow card) 90+2'	Stadium: Hillsborough Stadium; Attendance: 25,646; Referee: Andy Davies

18 April 2025 43	Stoke City	2–0	Sheffield Wednesday	Stoke-on-Trent
15:00 BST	Pearson (yellow card) 2'; Manhoef 21'; Wilmot (yellow card) 53', (goal) 61'	Report	Iorfa (yellow card) 3'; Bannan (yellow card) 66'	Stadium: Bet365 Stadium; Attendance: 29,163; Referee: Stephen Martin
Note: Live on Sky Sports

21 April 2025 44	Sheffield Wednesday	2–1	Middlesbrough	Sheffield
15:00 BST	Smith (yellow card) 13'; Ingelsson (yellow card) 21'; Paterson (yellow card) 51'; Windass 54'; Musaba 89'	Report	Azaz 11', (yellow card) 84'; Conway (penalty missed) 22'; Hackney (yellow card) 36'; Travers (yellow card) 55' van den Berg (yellow card) 69'	Stadium: Hillsborough Stadium; Attendance: 27,668; Referee: Bobby Madley
Note: Live on Sky Sports

26 April 2025 45	Sheffield Wednesday	1–1	Portsmouth	Sheffield
15:00 BST	Paterson 9'; Ingelsson (yellow card) 90+1'	Report	Blair 23'; Shaughnessy (yellow card) 37'; Dozzell (yellow card) 67'	Stadium: Hillsborough Stadium; Attendance: 28,346; Referee: Leigh Doughty

3 May 2025 46	Watford	1–1	Sheffield Wednesday	Watford
15:00 BST	Sissoko 45+1'	Report	Windass 29'; Valery (yellow card) 65'	Stadium: Vicarage Road; Attendance: 20,657; Referee: Stephen Martin

=== FA Cup ===
Sheffield Wednesday entered the FA Cup in the third round, and were drawn away to Coventry City.

11 January 2025 Third round	Coventry City	1–1 (a.e.t.) (4–3 p)	Sheffield Wednesday	Coventry
18:00 GMT	Rudoni (yellow card) 6'; Kitching 26'; Allen (yellow card) 82'; Thomas (yellow card) 98'; Eccles (yellow card) 104'	Report	Kobacki (yellow card) 84'; Musaba 90+3'	Stadium: Coventry Building Society Arena; Attendance: 20,906; Referee: Thomas Kirk
	Penalties
	Torp (penalty scored); Bidwell (penalty missed); Eccles (penalty scored); Rudoni (penalty scored); Bassette (penalty scored)		(penalty scored) Windass; (penalty scored) Bannan; (penalty missed) J. Lowe; (penalty scored) S. Charles; (penalty missed) Kobacki

=== EFL Cup ===
On 27 June, the draw for the first round was made, with Sheffield Wednesday being drawn away against Hull City. The second round was drawn straight after the win against Hull City, with Sheffield Wednesday being drawn against Grimsby Town. On 28 August, Wednesday were drawn away to Blackpool in the third round. On 25 September 2025, the fourth round draw took place which saw them drawn against Brentford.

14 August 2024 First round	Hull City	1–2	Sheffield Wednesday	Kingston upon Hull
19:45 BST	Mehlem 9'; McLoughlin (yellow card) 90+1'	Report	McNeill 1', 10'; Ihiekwe (yellow card) 36'; Valentín (yellow card) 86'	Stadium: MKM Stadium; Attendance: 9,281; Referee: Tom Nield

27 August 2024 Second round	Grimsby Town	1–5	Sheffield Wednesday	Cleethorpes
19:45 BST	McJannet 18'; Hume (yellow card) 38'; Carson (yellow card) 80'	Report	Ihiekwe (yellow card) 27'; Ugbo 53'; J. Lowe 54'; Windass (yellow card) 68'; Paterson 72', 81'; Valentín 90+3'	Stadium: Blundell Park; Attendance: 6,364; Referee: Matthew Corlett

17 September 2024 Third round	Blackpool	0–1	Sheffield Wednesday	Blackpool
19:45 BST	Beesley (yellow card) 63'; Morgan (yellow card) 68'	Report	Musaba (yellow card) 31'; Bernard 34'; Valentín (yellow card) 74'; P. Charles (yellow card) 88'; Gassama (yellow card) 90+1'	Stadium: Bloomfield Road; Attendance: 5,429; Referee: Thomas Kirk

29 October 2024 Fourth round	Brentford	1–1 (5–4 p)	Sheffield Wednesday	Brentford
20:00 GMT	Schade 11'	Report	Gassama 57'; Smith (yellow card) 90'	Stadium: Brentford Community Stadium; Attendance: 16,701; Referee: Will Finnie
	Penalties
	Mbeumo (penalty scored); Lewis-Potter (penalty scored); Damsgaard (penalty scored); Wissa (penalty scored); Janelt (penalty scored)		(penalty scored) Smith; (penalty scored) Windass; (penalty scored) J. Lowe; (penalty scored) Johnson; (penalty missed) Palmer

== Transfers & contracts ==
=== In ===
Date	Pos.	Player	From	Fee	Ref.
21 June 2024	RB	(Tunisia) Yan Valery	(France) Angers	Undisclosed	
1 July 2024 (Note: The transfer was announced on 14 June, and would become official on July 1 once his Watford contract expired)	GK	(England) Ben Hamer	(England) Watford	Free	
1 July 2024 (Note: The transfer was announced on 28 June, and would become official on July 1 once his Hansa Rostock contract expired)	CM	(Sweden) Svante Ingelsson	(Germany) Hansa Rostock	Free	
1 July 2024 (Note: The transfer was announced on 30 June, and would become official on July 1 once his AFC Bournemouth contract expired)	RW	(Jamaica) Jamal Lowe	(England) AFC Bournemouth	Free	
1 July 2024 (Note: The transfer was announced on 15 June, and would become official on July 1 once his Sheffield United contract expired)	LB	(England) Max Lowe	(England) Sheffield United	Free	
3 July 2024	LW	(Poland) Olaf Kobacki	(Poland) Arka Gdynia	Undisclosed	
10 July 2024	CF	(England) Charlie McNeill	(England) Manchester United	Free	
13 July 2024	DM	(England) Nathaniel Chalobah	(England) West Bromwich Albion	Free	
31 July 2024	GK	(Republic of Ireland) Killian Barrett †	(England) Binfield	Free	
8 August 2024	CF	(Canada) Iké Ugbo	(France) Troyes	Undisclosed	
6 September 2024	CF	(England) George Brown †	(England) Leeds UFCA	Free	
29 November 2024	RW	(England) Junior Kamwa †	(England) Bradford City	Free	
31 January 2025	CM	(Scotland) Stuart Armstrong	(Canada) Vancouver Whitecaps	Undisclosed	
6 February 2025	LB	(Japan) Ryō Hatsuse	(Japan) Vissel Kobe	Free	

† Signed for the academy

=== Out ===
Date	Pos.	Player	To	Fee	Ref.
22 August 2024	CB	(Senegal) Bambo Diaby	(Spain) Elche	Undisclosed	

=== Loaned in ===
Date	Pos.	Player	Loaned from	Until	Ref.
4 July 2024	GK	(England) James Beadle	(England) Brighton & Hove Albion	End of Season	
27 August 2024	DM	(Northern Ireland) Shea Charles	(England) Southampton	End of Season (Note: Shea Charles’s was recalled on 15 January but was eligible to play the next two games until 22 January. The two clubs agreed a new deal on 24 January until the end of the season)	
1 February 2025	LW	(Netherlands) Ibrahim Cissoko	(France) Toulouse	End of Season	

=== Loaned out ===
Date	Pos.	Player	Loaned to	Until	Ref.
15 August 2024	RW	(England) Mallik Wilks	(England) Rotherham United	End of Season	
28 August 2024	CF	(England) Bailey Cadamarteri	(England) Lincoln City	End of Season	
30 August 2024	CB	(England) Mackenzie Maltby	(England) Scarborough Athletic	26 December 2024 (Note: Mackenzie Maltby’s loan was extended on 27 September 2024)	
4 October 2024	GK	(England) Jack Hall	(England) Bradford (Park Avenue)	1 January 2025 (Note: Jack Hall returned from his loan on 1 January 2025 after initially signing a one-month loan)	
26 November 2024	LB	(England) Sam Reed	(England) Boston United	8 January 2025	
9 December 2024	GK	(Republic of Ireland) Killian Barrett	(England) Solihull Moors	1 February 2025 (Note: Killian Barret's loan was extended on 9 January 2025 for an additional month)	
7 January 2025	CM	(England) Sean Fusire	(England) Carlisle United	End of Season	
13 January 2025	CM	(England) Rio Shipston	(Republic of Ireland) Cork City	End of Season	
4 February 2025	CB	(England) Mackenzie Maltby	(England) Scarborough Athletic	End of Season	
13 February 2025	LB	(England) Sam Reed	(England) Scarborough Athletic	End of Season	
17 February 2025	GK	(England) Jack Hall	(England) Bridlington Town	End of Season	
18 February 2025	CF	(England) Dom Weston	(England) Liversedge	18 March 2025	
28 March 2025	GK	(Republic of Ireland) Killian Barrett	(England) Rochdale	End of Season	

=== Released / Out of Contract ===
Date	Pos.	Player	Subsequent club	Join date	Ref.
30 June 2024	CM	(England) Tyreeq Bakinson	(England) Wycombe Wanderers	1 July 2024	
30 June 2024	CB	(Republic of Ireland) Ciaran Brennan	(Wales) Newport County	1 July 2024	
30 June 2024	GK	(England) Cameron Dawson	(England) Rotherham United	1 July 2024	
30 June 2024	CF	(England) Lee Gregory	(England) Mansfield Town	1 July 2024	
30 June 2024	LB	(England) Reece James	(England) Rotherham United	1 July 2024	
30 June 2024	CM	(Wales) Will Vaulks	(England) Oxford United	1 July 2024	
30 June 2024	RB	(Chile) Juan Delgado	(Chile) Everton	2 July 2024	
30 June 2024	CB	(Republic of Ireland) Adam Alimi-Adetoro	(England) FC Halifax Town	9 July 2024	
30 June 2024	CM	(Scotland) George Byers	(England) Port Vale	9 July 2024	
30 June 2024	CM	(England) Jay Glover	(England) Matlock Town	9 August 2024	
30 June 2024	CF	(England) Luke Cook	(England) Chipstead	29 September 2024	
30 June 2024	GK	(England) Luke Jackson	(England) Liversedge	8 November 2024	
30 June 2024	LB	(England) Tyrell Dawes	(England) Liversedge	7 February 2025	
30 June 2024	LB	(Portugal) Carlos Rodrigues	(England) Emley	8 August 2025	

=== Contracts ===
Date	Pos.	Player	Length	Expiry	Ref.
2 July 2024	SS	(England) Josh Windass	–	–	
3 July 2024	CM	(Portugal) Bruno Fernandes	–	–	
3 July 2024	GK	(England) Jack Hall	–	–	
3 July 2024	CB	(England) Dominic Iorfa	–	–	
3 July 2024	LB	(England) Reece Johnson	–	–	
3 July 2024	CB	(England) Mackenzie Maltby	–	–	
3 July 2024	CF	(Northern Ireland) Devlan Moses	–	–	
3 July 2024	GK	(England) Jack Phillips	–	–	
3 July 2024	CM	(England) Jarvis Thornton	–	–	
18 July 2024	CB	(Jamaica) Di'Shon Bernard	–	–	
3 January 2025	CM	(England) Sean Fusire	–	–	
3 February 2025	CB	(Republic of Ireland) Gabriel Otegbayo	—	—	
15 May 2025	RW	(Netherlands) Anthony Musaba	One-year option	June 2026	
15 May 2025	CF	(England) Michael Smith	One-year option	June 2026	
15 May 2025	SS	(England) Josh Windass	One-year option	June 2026	

== Squad statistics ==
=== Appearances ===
As of 3 May 2025

No.	Pos	Nat	Player	Total		Championship		FA Cup		EFL Cup	
No.	Pos	Nat	Player	Apps	Goals	Apps	Goals	Apps	Goals	Apps	Goals
1	GK	(England) ENG	James Beadle	38	0	38	0	0	0	0	0
2	DF	(Scotland) SCO	Liam Palmer	27	0	7+16	0	0	0	2+2	0
3	DF	(England) ENG	Max Lowe	37	0	31+3	0	1	0	2	0
4	MF	(England) ENG	Nathaniel Chalobah	18	0	4+12	0	1	0	1	0
5	DF	(Jamaica) JAM	Di'Shon Bernard	31	3	26+1	2	1	0	1+2	1
6	DF	(England) ENG	Dominic Iorfa	23	1	17+5	1	0	0	1	0
8	MF	(Sweden) SWE	Svante Ingelsson	38	1	19+16	1	1	0	2	0
9	FW	(Jamaica) JAM	Jamal Lowe	28	4	12+12	3	0+1	0	1+2	1
10	MF	(Scotland) SCO	Barry Bannan	45	4	40+1	4	0+1	0	0+3	0
11	FW	(England) ENG	Josh Windass	47	13	38+6	13	0+1	0	0+2	0
12	FW	(Canada) CAN	Iké Ugbo	38	1	15+19	0	1	0	2+1	1
13	FW	(Scotland) SCO	Callum Paterson	31	8	14+13	6	0	0	4	2
14	DF	(Spain) ESP	Pol Valentín	37	2	13+21	1	0	0	2+1	1
16	FW	(Netherlands) NED	Ibrahim Cissoko	5	0	0+5	0	0	0	0	0
17	FW	(England) ENG	Charlie McNeill	7	2	0+4	0	0	0	2+1	2
18	DF	(England) ENG	Marvin Johnson	44	0	30+11	0	0	0	3	0
19	FW	(Poland) POL	Olaf Kobacki	15	0	4+8	0	0+1	0	2	0
20	DF	(England) ENG	Michael Ihiekwe	25	2	20+2	2	0+1	0	2	0
23	DF	(England) ENG	Akin Famewo	15	0	11+2	0	0	0	1+1	0
24	FW	(England) ENG	Michael Smith	44	8	16+25	8	0	0	2+1	0
27	DF	(Tunisia) TUN	Yan Valery	40	3	38+1	3	1	0	0	0
28	DF	(Japan) JPN	Ryō Hatsuse	6	0	5+1	0	0	0	0	0
33	DF	(Republic of Ireland) IRL	Gabriel Otegbayo	15	1	4+7	1	1	0	2+1	0
40	MF	(Scotland) SCO	Stuart Armstrong	11	0	6+5	0	0	0	0	0
41	FW	(France) FRA	Djeidi Gassama	47	8	36+7	7	1	0	1+2	1
44	MF	(Northern Ireland) NIR	Shea Charles	44	1	42+1	1	1	0	0	0
45	FW	(Netherlands) NED	Anthony Musaba	32	4	12+17	3	1	1	2	0
47	GK	(Northern Ireland) NIR	Pierce Charles	13	0	8	0	1	0	4	0
Players out on loan:
30	MF	(England) ENG	Sean Fusire	4	0	0	0	0	0	4	0
42	FW	(England) ENG	Bailey Cadamarteri	1	0	0	0	0	0	0+1	0
Players that left the club mid-season:
15	DF	(Spain) ESP	Bambo Diaby	1	0	0	0	0	0	1	0

=== Goalscorers ===
As of 3 May 2025

Rank	Pos.	Nat.	No.	Player	Championship	FA Cup	EFL Cup	Total
1	FW	(England)	11	Josh Windass	13	0	0	13
2	FW	(Scotland)	13	Callum Paterson	6	0	2	8
2	FW	(England)	24	Michael Smith	8	0	0	8
2	FW	(France)	41	Djeidi Gassama	7	0	1	8
3	FW	(Jamaica)	9	Jamal Lowe	3	0	1	4
3	MF	(Scotland)	10	Barry Bannan	4	0	0	4
3	FW	(Netherlands)	45	Anthony Musaba	3	1	0	4
4	DF	(Jamaica)	5	Di'Shon Bernard	2	0	1	3
4	DF	(Tunisia)	27	Yan Valery	3	0	0	3
5	DF	(Spain)	14	Pol Valentín	1	0	1	2
5	FW	(England)	17	Charlie McNeill	0	0	2	2
5	DF	(England)	20	Michael Ihiekwe	2	0	0	2
6	DF	(England)	6	Dominic Iorfa	1	0	0	1
6	MF	(Sweden)	8	Svante Ingelsson	1	0	0	1
6	FW	(Canada)	12	Iké Ugbo	0	0	1	1
6	DF	(Republic of Ireland)	33	Gabriel Otegbayo	1	0	0	1
6	MF	(Northern Ireland)	44	Shea Charles	1	0	0	1
6	Own goals				4	0	0	4
Total					60	1	9	70

=== Assists ===
As of 3 May 2025

Rank	Pos.	Nat.	No.	Player	Championship	FA Cup	EFL Cup	Total
1	MF	(Scotland)	10	Barry Bannan	5	0	1	6
1	FW	(England)	11	Josh Windass	5	1	0	6
1	FW	(England)	24	Michael Smith	4	0	2	6
1	FW	(Netherlands)	45	Anthony Musaba	6	0	0	6
2	MF	(Sweden)	8	Svante Ingelsson	5	0	0	5
2	MF	(Northern Ireland)	44	Shea Charles	5	0	0	5
3	DF	(Tunisia)	27	Yan Valery	4	0	0	4
4	DF	(England)	18	Marvin Johnson	2	0	1	3
5	FW	(Jamaica)	9	Jamal Lowe	2	0	0	2
5	FW	(Scotland)	13	Callum Paterson	2	0	0	2
6	FW	(Canada)	12	Iké Ugbo	0	0	1	1
6	DF	(Spain)	14	Pol Valentín	0	0	1	1
6	FW	(Poland)	19	Olaf Kobacki	0	0	1	1
6	DF	(England)	23	Akin Famewo	1	0	0	1
6	MF	(Scotland)	40	Stuart Armstrong	1	0	0	1
6	FW	(France)	41	Djeidi Gassama	1	0	0	1
Total					43	1	7	51

=== Disciplinary record ===
As of 3 May 2025

No.	Pos.	Player	Championship		FA Cup		EFL Cup		Total	
No.	Pos.	Player	Yellow card	Red card	Yellow card	Red card	Yellow card	Red card	Yellow card	Red card
1	GK	James Beadle	2	0	0	0	0	0	2	0
2	DF	Liam Palmer	3	0	0	0	0	0	3	0
3	DF	Max Lowe	2	0	0	0	0	0	2	0
4	MF	Nathaniel Chalobah	3	0	0	0	0	0	3	0
5	DF	Di'Shon Bernard	8	2	0	0	0	0	8	2
6	DF	Dominic Iorfa	4	0	0	0	0	0	4	0
8	MF	Svante Ingelsson	5	0	0	0	0	0	5	0
9	FW	Jamal Lowe	2	0	0	0	0	0	2	0
10	MF	Barry Bannan	8	0	0	0	0	0	8	0
11	FW	Josh Windass	8	0	0	0	1	0	9	0
12	FW	Iké Ugbo	1	0	0	0	0	0	1	0
13	FW	Callum Paterson	2	0	0	0	0	0	2	0
14	DF	Pol Valentín	4	0	0	0	2	0	6	0
16	FW	Ibrahim Cissoko	1	0	0	0	0	0	1	0
18	DF	Marvin Johnson	3	0	0	0	0	0	3	0
19	FW	Olaf Kobacki	1	0	1	0	0	0	2	0
20	DF	Michael Ihiekwe	1	0	0	0	2	0	3	0
23	DF	Akin Famewo	2	0	0	0	0	0	2	0
24	FW	Michael Smith	3	0	0	0	1	0	4	0
27	DF	Yan Valery	7	0	0	0	0	0	7	0
28	DF	Ryō Hatsuse	1	0	0	0	0	0	1	0
41	FW	Djeidi Gassama	4	0	0	0	1	0	5	0
44	MF	Shea Charles	10	0	0	0	0	0	10	0
45	FW	Anthony Musaba	0	0	0	0	1	0	1	0
47	GK	Pierce Charles	1	0	0	0	1	0	2	0

=== Clean sheets ===
As of 3 May 2025

No.	Nat.	Player	Matches played	Clean sheet %	Championship	FA Cup	EFL Cup	Total
1	(England)	James Beadle	38	23.68%	9	0	0	9
47	(Northern Ireland)	Pierce Charles	13	7.69%	0	0	1	1

== Awards ==
=== Club Player of the Month ===
Player of the Month awards for the 2024–25 season.

Month	First	%	Second	%	Third	%	Ref
August	(Sweden) Svante Ingelsson	20%	(Scotland) Callum Paterson	15%	(Spain) Pol Valentín	10%	
September	(Scotland) Barry Bannan	60%	(England) James Beadle	15%	(Northern Ireland) Shea Charles	10%	
October	(Northern Ireland) Shea Charles	–	(England) Akin Famewo	–	(England) Michael Smith	–	
November	(England) Michael Smith	25%	(Northern Ireland) Shea Charles	15%	(Jamaica) Di'Shon Bernard	14%	
December	(England) Josh Windass	42%	(England) James Beadle	34%	(Northern Ireland) Shea Charles	8%	
January	(France) Djeidi Gassama	45%	(England) Max Lowe	23%	(Northern Ireland) Shea Charles	13%	
February	(Scotland) Callum Paterson	–					
March	(England) Michael Ihiekwe	35%	(Scotland) Callum Paterson	24%	(France) Djeidi Gassama	13%	
April	(Northern Ireland) Pierce Charles	46%	(Scotland) Callum Paterson	23%	(Northern Ireland) Shea Charles	11%	

=== Club Player of the Year ===
Player of the Year award for the 2024–25 season.

Winner	Ref
(Northern Ireland) Shea Charles	

=== Wise Old Owl Player of the Year ===
Player		Ref
(France) Djeidi Gassama	Winner	

=== Rainbow Owls Player of the Season ===
Player		Ref
(England) Josh Windass	Winner	

=== Michael Plumb Player of the Year ===
Player		Ref
(France) Djeidi Gassama	Winner	

=== Sky Bet Championship Manager of the Month ===
Month	Manager		Ref
December	(Germany) Danny Röhl	Nomination	

=== Sky Bet Championship Player of the Month ===
Month	Player		Ref
September	(Scotland) Barry Bannan	Nomination	
March	(England) Michael Ihiekwe	Nomination	

=== EFL Championship Young Player of the Season ===
Player		Ref
(Northern Ireland) Shea Charles	Nomination	

=== Sky Bet Championship Goal of the Month ===
Month	Player	Goal		Ref
September	(Scotland) Barry Bannan	90+3' vs Queens Park Rangers, 14 September	Nomination	
October	(England) Michael Smith	71' vs Portsmouth, 25 October	Winner	
December	(Scotland) Barry Bannan	64' vs Derby County, 1 December	Winner	
January	(England) Josh Windass	61' vs Derby County, 1 January	Winner	

=== EFL Goal of the Season ===
Player	Goal		Ref
(England) Josh Windass	61' vs Derby County, 1 January	Nomination	
