= Shea Charles =

Northern Irish footballer (born 2003)

- Charles with Fulham in 2026

Personal information
- Full name: Shea Emmanuel Charles
- Date of birth: 5 November 2003 (age 23)
- Place of birth: Manchester, England
- Height: 6 ft 2 in (1.89 m)
- Position: Midfielder

Team information
- Current team: Fulham
- Number: 19

Youth career
- 2011–2023: Manchester City

Senior career*
Years	Team	Apps	(Gls)
2023	Manchester City	1	(0)
2023–2026	Southampton	63	(3)
2024–2025	→ Sheffield Wednesday (loan)	43	(1)
2026–	Fulham	10	(0)

International career^{‡}
2018	Northern Ireland U16	2	(0)
2021	Northern Ireland U19	4	(0)
2022	Northern Ireland U21	2	(0)
2022–	Northern Ireland	41	(2)
- * Club domestic league appearances and goals as of 06:05, 10 November 2026 (UTC) ‡ National team caps and goals as of 00:10, 18 November 2026 (UTC)

Shea Emmanuel Charles (born 5 November 2003) is a professional footballer who plays as a midfielder for Premier League club Fulham. Born in England, he represents the Northern Ireland national team.

Charles is a product of the Manchester City academy and made his professional debut for the club in May 2023. He moved to Southampton in July 2023. Charles spent the 2024–25 season on loan at Sheffield Wednesday. He has represented Northern Ireland at youth and full international level.

== Early life ==
Shea Emmanuel Charles was born on 5 November 2003 in Manchester. He is of Northern Irish descent through his mother. He joined the Manchester City academy as a seven year old.

== Club career ==
=== Manchester City ===
Progressing through the City youth teams, he became a key player for the under-23 squad during the 2021–22 season, winning the Premier League 2, whilst still playing with the under-18, as they also won the national competition. During that season, the young player was also first called by Pep Guardiola to train with the Premier League squad.

On 22 February 2023, Charles was named as a substitute for City's UEFA Champions League last-16 tie away at RB Leipzig. On 28 May 2023, Charles made his Premier League debut coming on as a substitute in the 63rd minute in the last game of the season against Brentford in a 1–0 defeat.

=== Southampton ===
==== 2023–2024 ====
On 12 July 2023, Charles joined EFL Championship side Southampton on a four-year contract. He made his professional debut for the club on 8 August 2023 in a 3–1 defeat to Gillingham in the EFL Cup. On 12 August 2023, Charles made his first appearance in the league for Southampton in a 4–4 draw against Norwich City, replacing Stuart Armstrong in the 65th minute. During a 1–0 away victory against Queens Park Rangers on 23 December 2023, he received a red card following a second bookable offence for a foul on Albert Adomah.

==== 2024–2025: Loan to Sheffield Wednesday ====
On 27 August 2024, Charles signed for Championship side Sheffield Wednesday on a season-long loan, joining his younger brother Pierce Charles at the club. Charles made his debut starting against Millwall in the 3–0 defeat on 31 August 2024. He scored his first professional goal in the 93rd minute to beat Coventry City 2–1 on 5 October 2024. The same month he won Wednesday's player of the month award. On 15 January, Sheffield Wednesday chairman Dejphon Chansiri confirmed during a fans forum, that Charles was being recalled by Southampton but would still be available for their next two games. On 24 January 2025, it was confirmed that Charles had returned to Wednesday for the remainder of the season. He received a nomination for the EFL Championship Young Player of the Year in April alongside Jobe Bellingham and CJ Egan-Riley. He was presented with Sheffield Wednesday's Player of the Year at the final home game of the season.

==== 2025–2026 ====
On 25 October 2025, in a 2–1 defeat at Blackburn Rovers, Charles suffered a hamstring injury which was expected to prevent him playing until "late December". He returned to action as a substitute on 21 January 2026 in a 1–0 victory over Sheffield United, and scored his first league goal for Southampton on 10 February 2026, a dramatic late winner in a 4–3 victory at Leicester City. On 17 April 2026, Charles was awarded the EFL Championship Goal of the Month for March after he scored from 35-yards against Oxford United.

=== Fulham ===
On 11 August 2026, Charles joined Fulham on a five-year contract. The fee was reported as £30 million, making him the most expensive Northern Ireland footballer ever.

== International career ==
Shea Charles was capped by Northern Ireland from the under-16 to the under-21 level. He played two games with the under-16 side before becoming a key player with the under-19s. With the under-21 side, he played in matches against Slovakia and France in March 2022.

First called to the senior team by Ian Baraclough in May 2022, Charles made his international debut for Northern Ireland on 2 June, coming on as a substitute for George Saville in the 79th minute of the UEFA Nations League match against Greece. He made his first start three days later on 5 June, in another Nations League match against Cyprus.

== Style of play ==
Able to play as a defensive midfielder, a centre-back, a centre midfielder or a full-back, Charles is described as an athletic and technical player, already showing a great mentality from an early age.

== Personal life ==
His younger brother Pierce, is also a professional footballer who plays as a goalkeeper.

== Career statistics ==
=== Club ===
As of match played 7 November 2026

Appearances and goals by club, season and competition
Club	Season	League			FA Cup		EFL Cup		Europe		Other		Total	
Club	Season	Division	Apps	Goals	Apps	Goals	Apps	Goals	Apps	Goals	Apps	Goals	Apps	Goals
Manchester City U21	2021–22	—			—		—		—		2 (Note: Appearances in EFL Trophy)	0	2	0
Manchester City U21	2022–23	—			—		—		—		3	0	3	0
Manchester City U21	Total		—		—		—		—		5	0	5	0
Manchester City	2022–23	Premier League	1	0	0	0	0	0	0	0	0	0	1	0
Southampton	2023–24	Championship	32	0	4	0	1	0	—		1 (Note: Appearance(s) in Championship play-offs)	0	38	0
Southampton	2024–25	Premier League	0	0	—		0	0	—		—		0	0
Southampton	2025–26	Championship	31	3	2	1	3	1	—		2	1	38	6
Southampton	Total		63	3	6	1	4	1	—		3	1	76	6
Sheffield Wednesday (loan)	2024–25	Championship	43	1	1	0	0	0	—		—		44	1
Fulham	2026–27	Premier League	10	0	0	0	1	0	—		—		11	0
Career total			117	4	7	1	5	1	0	0	8	1	137	7

=== International ===
As of match played 17 November 2026

Appearances and goals by national team and year
National team	Year	Apps	Goals
Northern Ireland	2022	4	0
Northern Ireland	2023	9	0
Northern Ireland	2024	10	0
Northern Ireland	2025	8	1
Northern Ireland	2026	10	1
Total		41	2

Scores and results list Northern Ireland's goal tally first.

List of international goals scored by Shea Charles
No.	Date	Venue	Opponent	Score	Result	Competition
1	4 September 2025	Stade de Luxembourg, Luxembourg City, Luxembourg	Luxembourg	2–1	3–1	2026 FIFA World Cup qualification
2	25 September 2026	Boris Paichadze Dinamo Arena, Tbilisi, Georgia	Georgia	1–0	1–0	2026–27 UEFA Nations League B

== Honours ==
Southampton

- EFL Championship play-offs: 2024

Individual

- Sheffield Wednesday Player of the Year: 2024–25
