= Jaelin =

Jaelin is a given name. Notable people with the name include:

- Jaelin Howell (born 1999), American soccer player
- Jaelin Kauf (born 1996), American freestyle skier

== See also ==
- Jaelen
- Jaelyn
