= Anthony Musaba =

Association football player (born 2000)

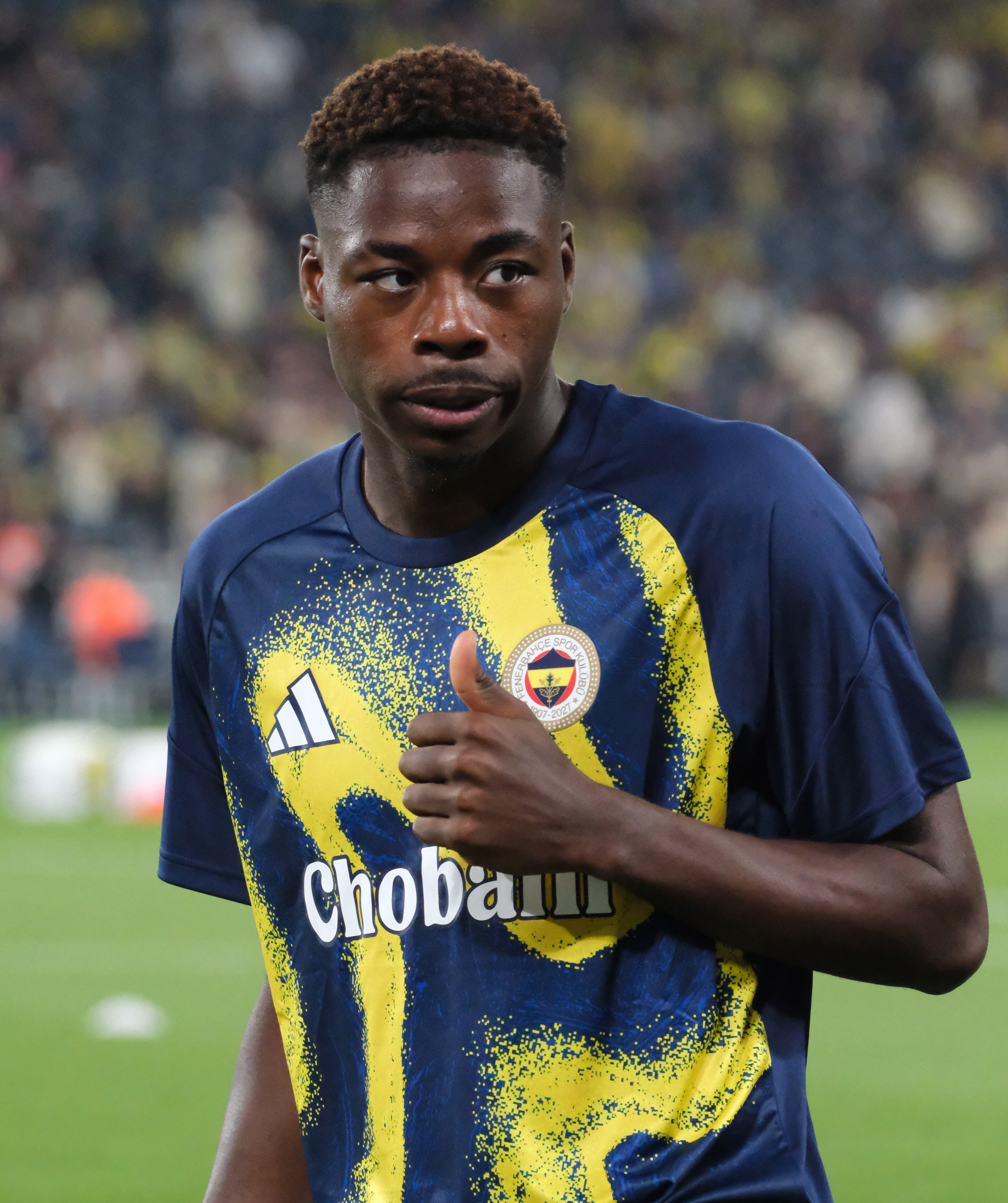
- Musaba with Fenerbahçe in 2026

Personal information
- Full name: Anthony Tite Emmanuel Musaba
- Date of birth: 6 December 2000 (age 25)
- Place of birth: Beuningen, Netherlands
- Height: 1.82 m (6 ft 0 in)
- Position: Winger

Team information
- Current team: Norwich City (on loan from Fenerbahçe)
- Number: 49

Youth career
- 2006–2009: VV Ewijk
- 2009–2014: NEC
- 2014–2018: Vitesse
- 2018–2019: NEC

Senior career*
Years	Team	Apps	(Gls)
2019–2020	NEC	28	(7)
2020–2023	Monaco	0	(0)
2020–2021	→ Cercle Brugge (loan)	29	(6)
2021–2022	→ Heerenveen (loan)	29	(1)
2022	→ Metz (loan)	7	(0)
2023	→ NEC (loan)	16	(1)
2023–2025	Sheffield Wednesday	72	(10)
2025–2026	Samsunspor	15	(4)
2026–	Fenerbahçe	15	(1)
2026–	→ Norwich City (loan)	13	(3)

International career^{‡}
2021	Netherlands U21	3	(0)
- * Club domestic league appearances and goals as of 7 November 2026 ‡ National team caps and goals as of 15 November 2021

Anthony Tite Emmanuel Musaba (born 6 December 2000) is a Dutch professional footballer who plays as a winger for EFL Championship club Norwich City, on loan from Süper Lig club Fenerbahçe.

== Club career ==
=== NEC Nijmegen ===
In early April 2019, after making the first-team squad during the season, Musaba was one of four trainees to sign a new contract with NEC. In the same month, he made his professional debut in an Eerste Divisie match against Volendam.

He scored seven goals and made five assists in 25 Eerste Divisie appearances in the 2019–20 season, which was cut short due to the COVID-19 pandemic and which was his first full season.

=== Monaco ===
In June 2020, Ligue 1 club Monaco announced the signing of Musaba on a five-year contract. The transfer fee paid to NEC was reported as €2-2.5 million.

On 3 August 2021, he made his debut as a late substitute in a UEFA Champions League qualifying third round first match against Sparta Prague in 2–0 away win.

==== Loan years ====
On 24 August 2020, he was loaned to Cercle Brugge until the end of 2020–21 season. On 29 August 2020, he made his Belgian Pro League debut as a substitute against KV Kortrijk, in a 1–0 home loss.

On 31 August 2021, he was loaned to Heerenveen until the end of 2021–22 season. 18 September 2021, he made his debut with the team in a Eredivisie 1–0 home win against Fortuna Sittard.

On 29 August 2022, he joined Metz on loan with an option to buy. On 3 September 2022, he played and scored for Metz B in a Championnat National 2 Group B match against Créteil in a 2–1 home loss. On 12 September 2022, he made his Ligue 2 debut as a substitute against Guingamp, in a 6–3 home loss.

On 4 January 2023, Musaba returned to NEC on loan.

=== Sheffield Wednesday ===
On 3 August 2023, Musaba joined EFL Championship side Sheffield Wednesday for an undisclosed fee. He made his debut coming off the bench against Southampton on 4 August 2023. He scored his first goal against Mansfield Town in the EFL Cup heading in from close range. His first league goal came against Middlesbrough when Di'Shon Bernard cut into the box from the right and pulled back for Musaba to calmly slot the ball into the net.

Musaba enjoyed a strong debut season and chipped in with eight goals in all competitions, seven in the Championship, and five assists. Following the end of the 2024–25 season an option was taken on his contract.

=== Samsunspor ===
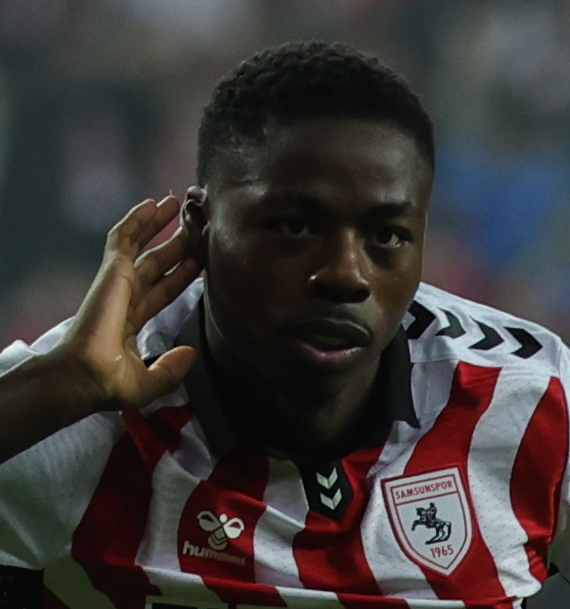
Musaba in 2025

During pre-season for the 2025–26 season, Musaba was heavily linked to Süper Lig side Samsunspor. On 12 July 2025, he joined the club, signing a four-year contract for an undisclosed fee.

On 28 August 2025, he made his debut with the team in a UEFA Europa League play-off match against Panathinaikos. Three days later, he made his Süper Lig debut as a starter against Trabzonspor in a 0–0 away draw.

=== Fenerbahçe ===
On 3 January 2026, Musaba joined Fenerbahçe on a four-and-a-half-year contract. The deal was sealed by triggering his release clause of €6 million. On 6 January 2026, he made his debut in the semi-finals of the Turkish Super Cup against his former club Samsunspor, and assisted both goals in a 2–0 victory. On 18 January 2026, he played in his first Süper Lig match against Alanyaspor, scoring one goal and providing one assist in 3–2 away win.

=== Norwich ===
On 19 August 2026, Musaba signed on a season-long loan for EFL Championship team Norwich City. Musaba scored his first goal for the club on 5 September 2026 in a 3–1 away victory against Sheffield Utd.

== International career ==
He is a Netherlands youth international, having represented the U21 team.

Musaba was one of the players who were called up with the DR Congo national team by head coach Sébastien Desabre for the 2027 Africa Cup of Nations qualification matches against Equatorial Guinea (24 September 2026), Zimbabwe (28 September) and the 2 friendlies against Uganda (2 and 5 October).

== Personal life ==
Musaba was born to Congolese parents. His twin brother Richie is also a professional footballer.

== Career statistics ==
As of 7 November 2026

Appearances and goals by club, season and competition
Club	Season	League			National cup (Note: Includes KNVB Cup, Belgian Cup, Coupe de France, FA Cup)		League cup (Note: Includes EFL Cup)		Continental		Other		Total	
Club	Season	Division	Apps	Goals	Apps	Goals	Apps	Goals	Apps	Goals	Apps	Goals	Apps	Goals
NEC	2018–19	Eerste Divisie	3	0	0	0	—		—		2 (Note: Appearances in Eredivisie promotion play-offs)	0	5	0
NEC	2019–20	Eerste Divisie	25	7	1	2	—		—		—		26	9
NEC	Total		28	7	1	2	0	0	0	0	2	0	31	9
Monaco	2020–21	Ligue 1	0	0	0	0	—		0	0	—		0	0
Monaco	2021–22	Ligue 1	0	0	0	0	—		1 (Note: Appearance(s) in UEFA Champions League)	0	—		1	0
Monaco	2022–23	Ligue 1	0	0	0	0	—		0	0	—		0	0
Monaco	Total		0	0	0	0	0	0	1	0	0	0	1	0
Cercle Brugge (loan)	2020–21	Belgian Pro League	29	6	2	0	—		—		—		31	6
Heerenveen (loan)	2021–22	Eredivisie	29	1	3	0	—		—		2 (Note: Appearances in UEFA Conference League play-offs)	0	34	1
Metz (loan)	2022–23	Ligue 2	7	0	2	1	—		—		1 (Note: Appearance in Championnat National 2 Group B)	1	10	2
NEC (loan)	2022–23	Eredivisie	16	1	2	1	—		—		—		18	2
Sheffield Wednesday	2023–24	EFL Championship	43	7	3	0	2	1	—		—		48	8
Sheffield Wednesday	2024–25	EFL Championship	29	3	1	1	2	0	—		—		32	4
Sheffield Wednesday	Total		72	10	4	1	4	1	0	0	0	0	80	12
Samsunspor	2025–26	Süper Lig	15	4	0	0	—		7 (Note: One appearance in UEFA Europa League, six appearance and two goals in UEFA Conference League)	2	0	0	22	6
Fenerbahçe	2025–26	Süper Lig	15	1	4	1	—		0	0	2 (Note: Appearance(s) in Turkish Super Cup)	0	21	2
Fenerbahçe	2026–27	Süper Lig	0	0	0	0	—		1	0	0	0	1	0
Fenerbahçe	Total		15	1	4	1	0	0	1	0	0	0	22	2
Norwich City (loan)	2026–27	EFL Championship	13	3	0	0	2	0	—		—		14	3
Career total			223	33	18	6	6	1	9	2	7	1	262	43

== Honours ==
Fenerbahçe

- Turkish Super Cup: 2025
