= Jaylan =

Jaylan is a given name. Notable people with the name include:

- Jaylan Ford (born 2001), American football linebacker
- Jaylan Hankins (born 2000), Gibraltarian footballer
- Jaylan Pearman (born 2006), Australian soccer player
