= Svante Ingelsson =

Swedish footballer

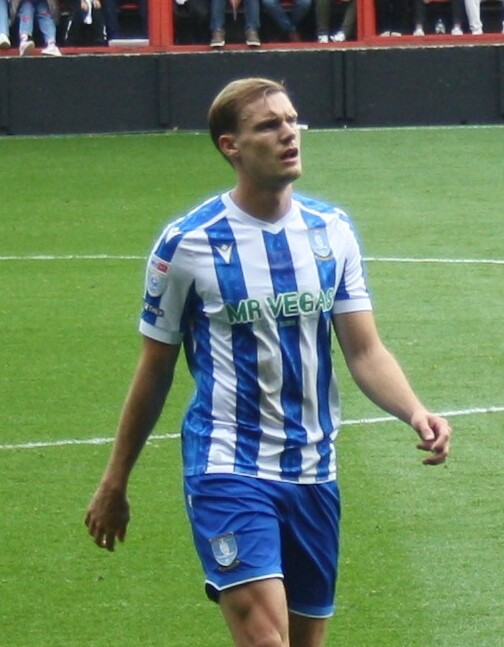
- Ingelsson with Sheffield Wednesday in 2025

Personal information
- Full name: Svante Ulf Ingel Ingelsson
- Date of birth: 14 June 1998 (age 28)
- Place of birth: Kalmar, Sweden
- Height: 1.89 m (6 ft 2 in)
- Position: Midfielder

Team information
- Current team: Stoke City
- Number: 6

Youth career
- 2002–2012: IFK Berga
- 2012–2015: Kalmar FF

Senior career*
Years	Team	Apps	(Gls)
2015–2017	Kalmar FF	26	(1)
2017–2021	Udinese	10	(1)
2019–2020	→ Pescara (loan)	4	(0)
2020	→ Kalmar FF (loan)	18	(2)
2020–2021	→ SC Paderborn (loan)	32	(0)
2021–2024	Hansa Rostock	82	(3)
2024–2026	Sheffield Wednesday	75	(2)
2026–	Stoke City	5	(0)

International career
2014–2015	Sweden U17	17	(2)
2015–2017	Sweden U19	14	(2)
2017–2020	Sweden U21	14	(2)
- * Club domestic league appearances and goals as of 17:17, 21 November 2026 (UTC)

Svante Ulf Ingel Ingelsson (born 14 June 1998) is a Swedish professional footballer who plays as a midfielder for EFL Championship club Stoke City.

== Club career ==
=== Kalmar FF ===
Born in Kalmar, Svante Ingelsson played in there from 2002 to 2017, starting as a four-year-old in IFK Berga, before moving to Kalmar FF ten years later in 2012. Being a key player in the Sweden U17 team and Kalmar's U17 and U19 teams, he was offered a senior contract in July 2015, a month after he turned 17. He made his Allsvenskan debut in September later that year, coming on as a substitute in the 82nd minute in Kalmar's draw away against Åtvidabergs FF. Ingelsson played three more games of the 2015 season, all of them as a substitute, and signed an extension of his contract that would keep him at the club for another three years. His first goal in the Allsvenskan came on 27 May 2017 in a 3–0 home victory over GIF Sundsvall. His goal, which was the second of the match, came in the 20th minute.

=== Udinese ===
On 1 July 2017, Ingelsson joined Udinese from Kalmar FF for an undisclosed transfer fee, signing a four-year contract due to run until 29 June 2021. He made his league debut for the club on 29 October 2017 in a 2–1 home victory over Atalanta. He was subbed off in the 62nd minute, and was replaced by Emil Hallfreðsson. His first league goal for the club came on 18 April 2018 in a 4–2 away loss to Napoli. His goal, assisted by Francesco Zampano, came in the 55th minute.

==== Loan to Pescara ====
On 30 August 2019, he joined Pescara on loan.

==== Loan to Kalmar FF ====
On 23 January 2020, he returned to Kalmar FF on loan until summer 2020.

==== Loan to SC Paderborn ====
On 23 September 2020, he joined German club SC Paderborn on loan for the 2020–21 season.

=== Hansa Rostock ===
In June 2021, it was announced that Ingelsson would join Hansa Rostock, newly promoted to the 2. Bundesliga for the 2021–22 season.

=== Sheffield Wednesday ===
On 28 June 2024, Sheffield Wednesday announced Ingelsson would join the club on 1 July. He made his Wednesday debut against Plymouth Argyle on 11 August 2024, starting the game in a 4–0 victory. After featuring in the first four games of the season, and his assist against Plymouth Argyle, he was awarded the clubs player of the month for August. He scored his first goal for Wednesday away at Middlesbrough on Boxing Day, scoring the first goal in a dramatic comeback after Wednesday went 3–0 down.

The following season he won the clubs August, October and February player of the month awards and was subsequently awarded the club's player of the season for the 2025–26 season. Following the end of the 2025–26 season, the new ownership at Sheffield Wednesday exercised their one year option to keep him at the club until 2027.

=== Stoke City ===
On 1 July 2026, Ingelsson joined EFL Championship club Stoke City, in a deal that could exceed £1million, signing a three-year contract.

== International career ==
Ingelsson represented the Sweden U17 team 17 times between 2013 and 2015, in which he scored two goals. In 2015, Ingelsson played his first game for the Sweden U19 team.

== Career statistics ==
=== Club ===
As of match played 21 November 2026

Appearances and goals by club, season and competition
Club	Season	League			National cup (Note: Includes Svenska Cupen, Coppa Italia, DFB-Pokal, FA Cup)		League cup (Note: Includes EFL Cup)		Total	
Club	Season	Division	Apps	Goals	Apps	Goals	Apps	Goals	Apps	Goals
Kalmar	2015	Allsvenskan	4	0	0	0	—		4	0
Kalmar	2016	Allsvenskan	11	0	3	0	—		14	0
Kalmar	2017	Allsvenskan	11	1	3	0	—		14	1
Kalmar	Total		26	1	6	0	—		32	1
Udinese	2017–18	Serie A	7	1	1	1	—		8	2
Udinese	2018–19	Serie A	3	0	0	0	—		3	0
Udinese	Total		10	1	1	1	—		11	2
Pescara (loan)	2019–20	Serie B	4	0	0	0	—		4	0
Kalmar (loan)	2020	Allsvenskan	18	2	3	0	—		21	2
SC Paderborn (loan)	2020–21	2. Bundesliga	32	0	2	0	—		34	0
Hansa Rostock	2021–22	2. Bundesliga	28	1	2	0	—		30	1
Hansa Rostock	2022–23	2. Bundesliga	24	1	1	0	—		25	1
Hansa Rostock	2023–24	2. Bundesliga	30	1	2	0	—		32	1
Hansa Rostock	Total		82	3	5	0	—		87	3
Sheffield Wednesday	2024–25	EFL Championship	35	1	1	0	2	0	38	1
Sheffield Wednesday	2025–26	EFL Championship	40	1	1	0	0	0	41	1
Sheffield Wednesday	Total		75	2	2	0	2	0	79	2
Stoke City	2026–27	EFL Championship	5	0	0	0	1	0	6	0
Career total			252	9	17	1	3	0	274	10

== Honours ==
Individual

- Sheffield Wednesday Player of the Year: 2025–26
