= Jaylon Moore =

Jaylon Moore may refer to:

- Jaylon Moore (offensive lineman) (born 1998), American football player
- Jaylon Moore (wide receiver) (born 1997), American football player
