= Jaylon Jones =

Jaylon Jones may refer to:

- Jaylon Jones (American football, born 1997), American football cornerback for the Jacksonville Jaguars
- Jaylon Jones (American football, born 2002), American football cornerback for the Tennessee Titans
