= Giancarlo Filippini =

Italian footballer

Personal information
- Date of birth: 27 December 1968 (age 57)
- Place of birth: Domodossola, Italy
- Height: 1.80 m (5 ft 11 in)
- Position: Defender

Senior career*
Years	Team	Apps	(Gls)
1985–1986	Juventus Domo	0	(0)
1986–1987	AC Milan	0	(0)
1987–1989	Pro Sesto	51	(2)
1989–1993	Venezia	112	(4)
1993–1994	Ravenna	25	(0)
1994–1998	Venezia	108	(2)
1998–2003	Hellas Verona	77	(0)
2001	→ Nice (loan)	9	(2)
2003–2005	Sambonifacese	53	(12)
2005–2006	Castellana	31	(0)
2006–2009	Domegliara	60	(6)
Total		526	(28)
- * Club domestic league appearances and goals

Giancarlo Filippini (born 27 December 1968) is an Italian former professional footballer who played as a defender.

== Career ==
Filippini stood out especially playing for Venezia, a team where he played for eight seasons and was Serie B champion in 1998–99. In 2001, a time when Italian football was still at its peak, he had an unusual loan from Hellas Verona to Nice, at the time in the Ligue 2. At the end of his career, he played for Domegliara, a team from the Veneto region, where he won the Eccellenza title.

== Honours ==
Venezia

- Serie B: 1998–99

Domegliara

- Eccellenza: 2006–07 (Veneto, group A)
