= Padri Filippini, Verona =

Neoclassical church in Verona, Italy

Coordinates: 45°26′12.86″N 10°59′58.14″E

Church of the Padri Filippini
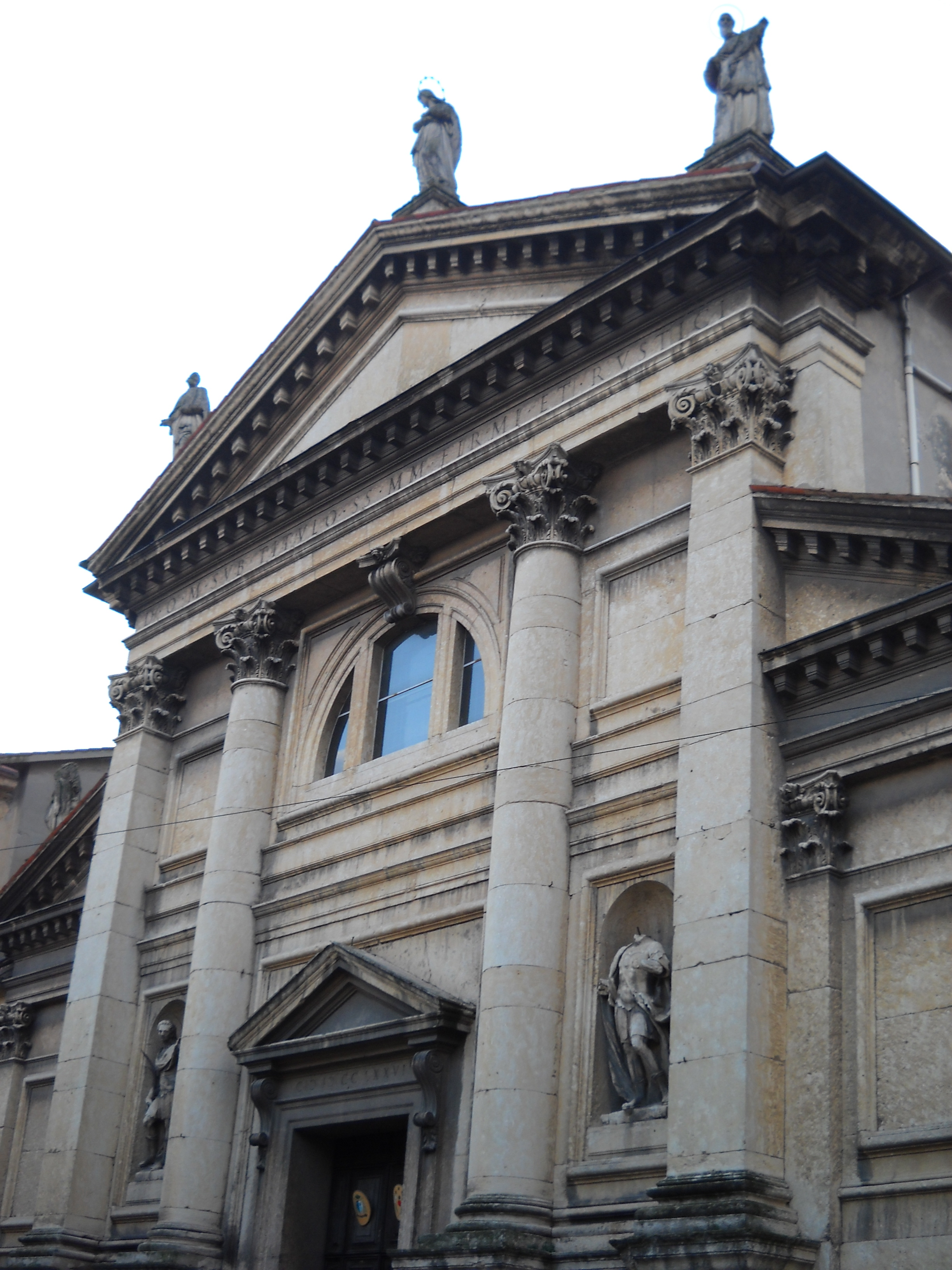

Religion
- Affiliation: Roman Catholic

Location
- Location: Via Filippini, Verona, Veneto, Italy
- Interactive map of Church of the Padri Filippini

Architecture
- Architect: Andrea Camerata
- Type: Church
- Style: Neoclassic
- Groundbreaking: 1759
- Completed: 1791

The church of Padri Filippini, also known as the Church of the Filippini, is a Neoclassical Catholic church in Verona, which like the older and neighbouring church of San Fermo Maggiore is dedicated to the saints Fermo and Rustico.

== History ==
Finding the older church of San Fermo Minore too narrow and cramped, the Oratorians in 1746 decided to replace it with this larger structure using plans by Andrea Camerata. The adjacent oratory was designed by Adriano Cristofali. Construction of the church was completed in 1791. The neoclassical church was decorated with works transferred from the San Fermo Minore, when that church was destroyed.

The present Filippini church was heavily damaged during the Second World War and subsequently rebuilt. The belltower contains a ring of 6 bells in G, cast in 1931 and rung with the Veronese bellringing art.
