= Jaylen Smith =

Jaylen Smith may refer to:

- Jaylen Smith (politician) (born c. 2004), American politician and mayor of Earle, Arkansas
- Jaylen Smith (tight end) (born 1997), American football player
- Jaylen Smith (linebacker) (born 2002), Canadian football player

== See also ==
- Jaylon Smith (born 1995), American football linebacker
- Jalen Smith (born 2000), American professional basketball player
