= Djeidi Gassama =

Mauritanian footballer (born 2003)

Personal information
- Full name: Djeidi Hamara Gassama
- Date of birth: 10 September 2003 (age 23)
- Place of birth: Niéléba Haouissé, Mauritania
- Height: 1.77 m (5 ft 10 in)
- Position: Left winger

Team information
- Current team: Rangers
- Number: 23

Youth career
- 2012–2014: AS Carrières Grésillons
- 2014–2017: Poissy
- 2017–2018: Mantes
- 2018–2019: Brest
- 2019–2022: Paris Saint-Germain

Senior career*
Years	Team	Apps	(Gls)
2022	Paris Saint-Germain B	1	(0)
2022–2023	Paris Saint-Germain	1	(0)
2022–2023	→ Eupen (loan)	19	(2)
2023–2025	Sheffield Wednesday	78	(10)
2025–	Rangers	50	(3)

International career^{‡}
2022	France U20	2	(0)
2026–	Mauritania	7	(0)
- * Club domestic league appearances and goals as of 23:00, 7 November 2026 (UTC) ‡ National team caps and goals as of 22:00, 17 November 2026 (UTC)

Djeidi Hamara Gassama (born 10 September 2003) is a Mauritanian professional footballer who plays as a winger for Scottish Premiership club Rangers and the Mauritania national team. He has also represented France at youth international level.

== Club career ==
=== Paris Saint-Germain ===
A former youth academy player of Brest, Gassama joined Paris Saint-Germain (PSG) in 2019. He signed his first professional contract with the club in July 2020. On 14 May 2022, he made his professional debut in a 4–0 league win against Montpellier.

On 6 September 2022, Gassama joined Belgian club Eupen on a season-long loan deal.

=== Sheffield Wednesday ===
On 15 August 2023, Gassama joined EFL Championship club Sheffield Wednesday. He made his debut on 19 August 2023 against Preston North End coming off the bench. His first goal came on 1 January 2024 against Hull City with a fine effort from 25 yards.

The following season, he won the clubs player of the month for January scoring twice. He finished the season winning the Wise Old Owl Player of the Year award. During pre-season for the 2025–26 season, Gassama was heavily linked with a move to Rangers, with manager Russell Martin saying the move was "all done at our end."

=== Rangers ===
On 15 July 2025, Gassama joined Scottish Premiership club Rangers on a four-year deal. A week later, he made his debut as a second-half substitute and subsequently scored on his debut in Rangers' UEFA Champions League qualifier against Panathinaikos in a 2–0 victory.

== International career ==
Born in Mauritania, Gassama represented France at youth international level. In September 2022, he was called up to the France under-20 team for two friendly matches against Tunisia.

In March 2026, Gassama received his first call-up to the Mauritania national team. On 27 March 2026, he made his debut for Mauritania in a 2–1 loss to Argentina.

== Career statistics ==
=== Club ===
As of 20 August 2026

Appearances and goals by club, season and competition
Club	Season	League			National cup (Note: Includes Belgian Cup, FA Cup, Scottish Cup)		League cup (Note: Includes EFL Cup, Scottish League Cup)		Continental		Total	
Club	Season	Division	Apps	Goals	Apps	Goals	Apps	Goals	Apps	Goals	Apps	Goals
Paris Saint-Germain B	2021–22	National 3	1	0	—		—		—		1	0
Paris Saint-Germain	2021–22	Ligue 1	1	0	0	0	—		—		1	0
Eupen (loan)	2022–23	Belgian First Division A	19	2	1	0	—		—		20	2
Sheffield Wednesday	2023–24	Championship	35	3	2	1	0	0	—		37	4
Sheffield Wednesday	2024–25	Championship	43	7	1	0	3	1	—		47	8
Sheffield Wednesday	Total		78	10	3	1	3	1	—		84	12
Rangers	2025–26	Scottish Premiership	38	3	2	0	2	0	14 (Note: 6 appearances and 4 goals in UEFA Champions League & 8 appearances and 2 goals in UEFA Europa League)	6	56	9
Rangers	2026–27	Scottish Premiership	2	0	0	0	1	1	2 (Note: 1 appearance in UEFA Europa League & 1 appearance in UEFA Conference League)	0	5	1
Rangers	Total		40	3	2	0	3	1	16	6	61	10
Career total			139	15	6	1	6	2	16	6	167	24

=== International ===
As of match played 17 November 2026

Appearances and goals by national team and year
National team	Year	Apps	Goals
Mauritania	2026	7	0
Total		7	0

== Honours ==
Paris Saint-Germain

- Ligue 1: 2021–22
