= James Beadle =

English footballer (born 2004)

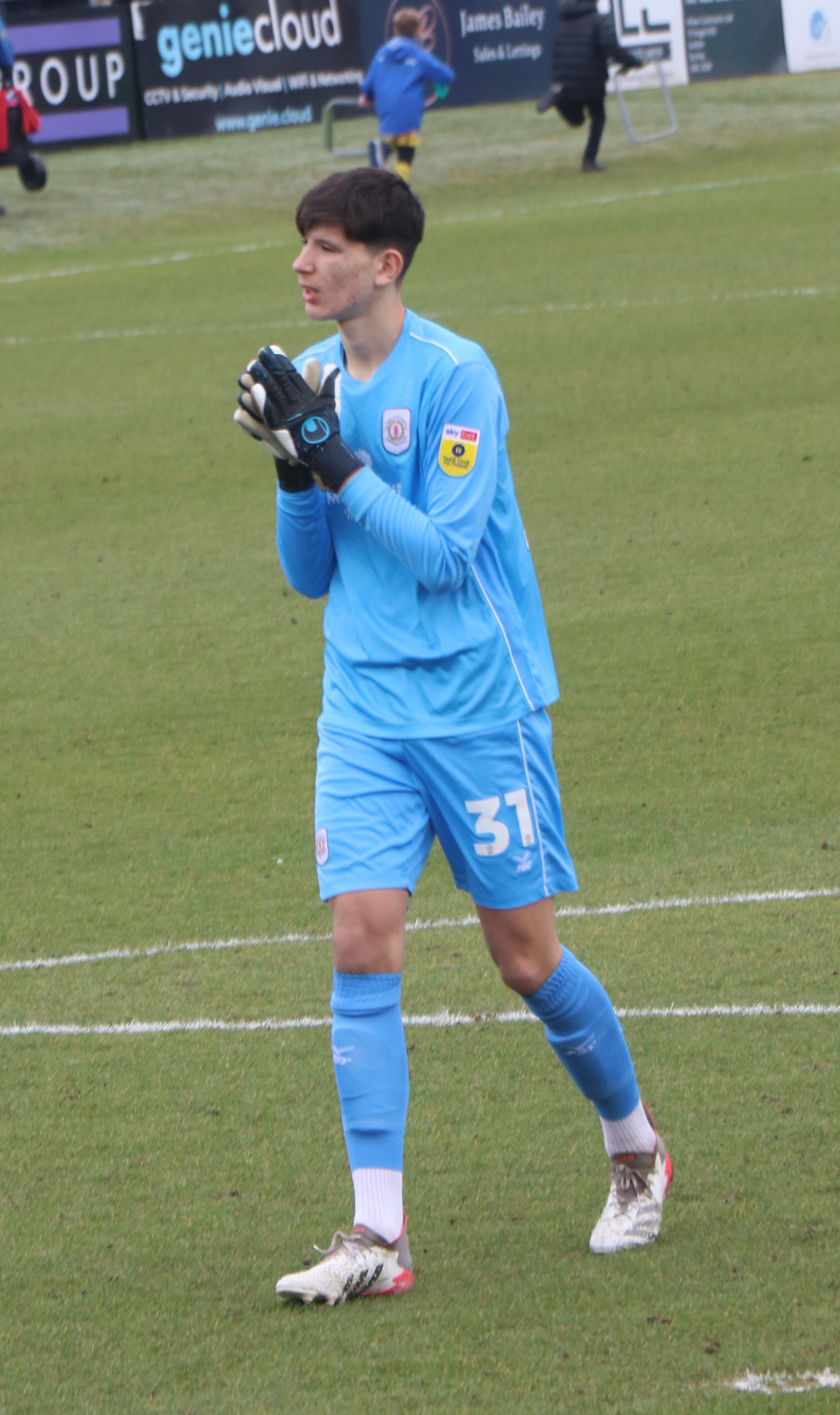
- Beadle playing for Crewe Alexandra in 2023

Personal information
- Full name: James Giles Beadle
- Date of birth: 16 July 2004 (age 22)
- Place of birth: Bexley, England
- Height: 2.01 m (6 ft 7 in)
- Position: Goalkeeper

Team information
- Current team: Birmingham City (on loan from Brighton & Hove Albion)
- Number: 1

Youth career
- 2013–2022: Charlton Athletic
- 2022–2023: Brighton & Hove Albion

Senior career*
Years	Team	Apps	(Gls)
2023–	Brighton & Hove Albion	0	(0)
2023	→ Crewe Alexandra (loan)	9	(0)
2023–2024	→ Oxford United (loan)	25	(0)
2024	→ Sheffield Wednesday (loan)	19	(0)
2024–2025	→ Sheffield Wednesday (loan)	38	(0)
2025–2026	→ Birmingham City (loan)	35	(0)
2026–	→ Birmingham City (loan)	14	(0)

International career^{‡}
2019	England U15	3	(0)
2019	England U16	1	(0)
2021–2022	England U18	3	(0)
2022–2023	England U19	6	(0)
2023	England U20	6	(0)
2024–	England U21	18	(0)
Medal record
Men's football
Representing England
UEFA European Under-21 Championship
Winner	2025 Slovakia
- * Club domestic league appearances and goals as of 08:24, 22 November 2026 (UTC) ‡ National team caps and goals as of 2 October 2026

James Giles Beadle (born 16 July 2004) is an English professional footballer who plays as a goalkeeper for EFL Championship club Birmingham City, on loan from Premier League club Brighton & Hove Albion, and the England U21 national team.

== Club career ==
=== Brighton & Hove Albion ===
Born in Bexley, Beadle played youth football for Charlton Athletic and Brighton & Hove Albion before signing professionally with the latter.

==== Crewe Alexandra (loan) ====
Beadle moved on loan to League Two side Crewe Alexandra from Brighton in January 2023. He made his senior debut, keeping a clean sheet, in Crewe's goalless draw at Walsall on 21 February 2023. During his ninth Crewe appearance, at Colchester United on 10 April 2023, Beadle injured his ankle and subsequently returned to his home club, Brighton.

==== Oxford United (loan) ====
In June 2023, it was announced that he would join Oxford United of League One on loan on 1 July 2023. He made his debut on the opening weekend of the season on 5 August.

==== Sheffield Wednesday (loans) ====
On 8 January 2024, he was recalled from his loan at Oxford United and then joined Championship club Sheffield Wednesday on loan for the remainder of the season. He made his debut in the 2–1 defeat against Coventry City on 20 January.

On 4 July 2024, Beadle returned to Sheffield Wednesday on another season-long loan. He made his second Wednesday debut against Plymouth Argyle on 11 August 2024, starting the game in a 4–0 victory.

==== Birmingham City (loans) ====
On 1 July 2025, Beadle signed a season long loan deal with newly promoted Championship club Birmingham City.

On 17 July 2026, after signing a new four-year contract with Brighton, Beadle returned to Birmingham for a second season-long loan.

== International career ==
Beadle has played for England at under-15, under-16 and under-18 youth levels. In September 2022 he represented the under-19 team in qualifying games.

On 10 May 2023, Beadle was included in the England squad for the 2023 FIFA U-20 World Cup. He made his U20 debut during the 0–0 draw with Iraq on 28 May 2023.

On 9 September 2024, Beadle made his England U21 debut during a 4–1 win over Austria at Kenilworth Road. He was later included in the England squad for the 2025 UEFA European Under-21 Championship, starting in the final as the Young Lions went on to win the tournament.

== Career statistics ==
As of match played 21 November 2026

Appearances and goals by club, season and competition
Club	Season	League			FA Cup		EFL Cup		Other		Total	
Club	Season	Division	Apps	Goals	Apps	Goals	Apps	Goals	Apps	Goals	Apps	Goals
Brighton & Hove Albion U21s	2022–23	—							3 (Note: Appearance(s) in the EFL Trophy.)	0	3	0
Brighton & Hove Albion	2022–23	Premier League	0	0	0	0	0	0	0	0	0	0
Brighton & Hove Albion	2023–24	Premier League	0	0	0	0	0	0	0	0	0	0
Brighton & Hove Albion	2024–25	Premier League	0	0	0	0	0	0	0	0	0	0
Brighton & Hove Albion	2025–26	Premier League	0	0	0	0	0	0	0	0	0	0
Brighton & Hove Albion	2026–27	Premier League	0	0	0	0	0	0	0	0	0	0
Brighton & Hove Albion	Total		0	0	0	0	0	0	0	0	0	0
Crewe Alexandra (loan)	2022–23	League Two	9	0	0	0	0	0	—		9	0
Oxford United (loan)	2023–24	League One	25	0	1	0	1	0	1	0	28	0
Sheffield Wednesday (loan)	2023–24	Championship	19	0	0	0	0	0	—		19	0
Sheffield Wednesday (loan)	2024–25	Championship	38	0	0	0	0	0	—		38	0
Birmingham City (loan)	2025–26	Championship	35	0	1	0	2	0	—		38	0
Birmingham City (loan)	2026–27	Championship	14	0	0	0	1	0	—		15	0
Career total			140	0	2	0	4	0	4	0	150	0

== Honours ==
England U21

- UEFA European Under-21 Championship: 2025

Individual

- UEFA European Under-21 Championship Team of the Tournament: 2025
