= Ramon Filippini =

Swedish footballer

Personal information
- Full name: Ramon Filippini
- Date of birth: 17 November 1928
- Place of birth: Malmö, Sweden
- Date of death: 22 June 2008 (aged 79)
- Position: Forward

Senior career*
Years	Team	Apps	(Gls)
1950–1951	Malmö FF	12	(3)
1951–1952	AC Legnano	12	(1)
- * Club domestic league appearances and goals

Ramon Filippini (17 November 1928 – 22 June 2008) was a Swedish footballer who played as a forward.

He played 12 games and scored 3 goals for Malmö FF when they won 1950–51 Allsvenskan.
