= Jérôme Filippini =

French civil servant (born 1968)

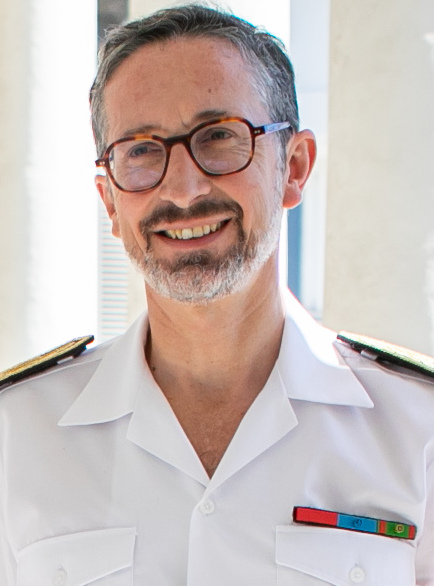
- Filippini in 2023

Prefect of Réunion
- In office 23 August 2022 – 10 October 2024
- President: Emmanuel Macron
- Preceded by: Jacques Billant
- Succeeded by: Patrice Latron

Personal details
- Born: 6 November 1968 (age 57)

Jérôme Filippini (born 6 November 1968) is a French civil servant. From 2024 to 2025, he served as prefect of Corsica. From 2022 to 2024, he served as prefect of Réunion. From 2020 to 2022, he served as prefect of Eure. From 2017 to 2019, he served as prefect of Lot.
