= Jaylin =

Jaylin, Jaylinn, or Jaelyn is a given name. Notable people with the name include:

== Athletes ==
- Jaelyn Brown (born 1998), American basketball player
- Jaelyn Duncan (born 2000), American football player
- Jaylin Bosak (born 1998), American soccer player
- Jaylin Davis (born 1994), American baseball player
- Jaylin Lane (born 2002), American football player
- Jaylin Lindsey (born 2000), American soccer player
- Jaylin Lucas (born 2004), American football player
- Jaylin Noel (born 2002), American football player
- Jaylin Simpson (born 2000), American football player
- Jaylin Smith (born 2003), American football player
- Jaylin Stewart (born 2005), American basketball player
- Jaylin Williams (basketball, born 2000), American basketball player
- Jaylin Williams (basketball, born 2002), American basketball player
- Jaylinn Hawkins (born 1997), American football player

== Other ==
- Jaelyn Young, American convicted of terrorist charges

== See also ==
- List of people starting with "Jaelyn"
- List of people starting with "Jaylin"
- Jaylen, given name
