= List of people with surname Moore =

Moore is a common surname in many English-speaking countries and is of Gaelic/English origin. This surname is shared by many notable people, among them being:

== A–B ==
- A. Moore Jr. (1846–1929), American politician and lawyer from Virginia
- A. J. Moore (born 1995), American football player
- A. L. Moore (Arthur Louis Moore; 1849–1939), English stained glass designer and manufacturer
- A. W. Moore (philosopher) (Adrian W. Moore, born 1956), English professor of philosophy at the University of Oxford
- Abra Moore (born 1969), Irish-American singer-songwriter
- Abraham Moore (1766–1822), English politician
- Adam Moore (born 1984), American baseball player
- Addison Webster Moore (1866–1930), American professor of philosophy at the University of Chicago
- Al Moore (disambiguation), multiple people
- Alan Moore (born 1953), English comic book writer and novelist
- Albert Joseph Moore (1841–1893), English decorative painter
- Albert Moore (Medal of Honor) (1862–1916), United States Marine
- Albert Moore (footballer, born 1863) (1863–?), English footballer for Notts County
- Albert Moore (footballer, born 1898) (1898–?), English footballer for Stoke
- Alecia Beth Moore, better known as Pink (born 1979), American pop/rock/R&B singer
- Alfred Moore (1755–1810), associate justice of the US Supreme Court
- Alicia Moore (1790-1873), English novelist
- Alvin Moore (disambiguation), multiple people
- Anne Carroll Moore, American educator, writer, and children's library advocate.
- Ann Moore (equestrian) (born 1950), 1972 Olympic silver medalist in show jumping
- Ann Moore (impostor) (1761–1813), notorious as the fasting-woman of Tutbury
- Ann Moore (inventor) (born 1940), inventor of the Snugli
- Ann S. Moore (born 1950), CEO of Time Inc.
- Anna Moore, astronomer
- Anne Elizabeth Moore, editor, artist, and author
- Annie May Moore: see May and Mina Moore (1882–1957), Australian photographers
- Anthony Moore (born 1948), British musician and composer
- Aoife Moore (fl. 2020's), Northern Irish journalist
- Arch A. Moore Jr. (1923–2015), twice Governor of West Virginia
- Archie Moore (1916–1998), American world boxing champion
- Arnold Moore (1914–2004), American blues singer
- Arthur A. C. Moore (1880–1935), Canadian ice hockey player
- Arthur Cotton Moore (1935–2022), American architect
- Arthur William Moore (1853–1909), Manx historian, antiquarian, linguist, folklorist and politician
- Aubertine Woodward Moore (1841–1929; pseudonym, "Auber Forestier"), American musician, writer
- Barbara Moore (athlete) (born 1957), New Zealand long-distance runner
- Barbara Moore (vegetarian) (1903-1977), Russian-born long-distance walker
- Barbara Moore Pointon (1939-2020), British composer and activist
- Ben Moore (basketball) (born 1995), American basketball player in the Israeli Basketball Premier League
- Benjamin E. Moore, New York assemblyman 1914
- Benjamin Moore (bishop) (1748–1816), American Protestant Episcopal bishop
- Bill Moore (disambiguation), multiple people
- Billie Moore (1943–2022), American basketball coach
- Bob Moore (disambiguation), multiple people
- Bobby Moore (1941–1993), English footballer
- Brian Moore (disambiguation), multiple people
- Brian Michael Moore, American tenor
- Briley Moore (born 1998), American football player
- Brittany Chrishawn Moore (fl 2010s), Jamaican-American film producer
- Bucky Moore (1905–1980), American football player
- Butch Moore (James Augustine Moore, 1938–2001), Irish showband icon during the 1960s
- Byron Moore (born 1988), English (soccer) football player

== C–D ==
- C. Ellis Moore (1884–1941), U.S. Representative from Ohio
- C. J. Moore (born 1995), American football player
- C. L. Moore, Catherine L. Moore (1911–1987), American science fiction and fantasy writer
- Carissa Moore (born 1992), American professional surfer
- Carlos Moore (1906–1958), American baseball player
- Carlos Moore (writer) (born 1942), Cuban writer, journalist and academic
- Carmen Moore (born 1972), Canadian actress
- Carmen Moore (American actress) (1986–2018)
- Carrie Moore (basketball) (born 1985), American basketball player and coach
- Cecil Moore (disambiguation), multiple people
- Chandler Moore (born 1995), American Christian singer, songwriter, and worship leader
- Chanté Moore (born 1967), American singer
- Charles Moore (disambiguation), multiple people
- Charlie Moore (disambiguation), multiple people
- Charlotte Moore (disambiguation), multiple people
- Christine Moore (disambiguation), multiple people
- Christopher Moore (author) (born 1957), American absurdist writer
- Christy Moore (born 1945), Irish folk singer, songwriter, and guitarist
- Chuck Moore (American football) (born 1940), former American football offensive lineman
- Cinthia Zermeño Moore, American politician
- Claire Moore (disambiguation), multiple people
- Clara Jessup Moore (1824–1899), American philanthropist and writer
- Clarence Bloomfield Moore (1852–1936), American archaeologist
- Clarence Lemuel Elisha Moore (1876–1931), American mathematician
- Clayton Moore (1914–1999), American actor
- Clement Clarke Moore (1779–1863), American professor and writer
- Clifford Herschel Moore (1866–1931), American Latin scholar
- Clover Moore (born 1945), Australian politician and Lord Mayor of Sydney, Australia
- Constance Moore (1920–2005), American singer and actress
- Corey Moore (safety) (born 1993), American football player
- Cowboy Jimmy Moore (born James William Moore, 1910–1999), pool champion
- Craig Moore (born 1975), Australian soccer player
- Cristopher Moore (born 1968), American computer scientist, mathematician, and physicist
- D. C. Moore (born 1980), British playwright
- Dakorien Moore (born 2007), American football player
- D. J. Moore (disambiguation), multiple people
  - D. J. Moore (born 1997), American football player
  - D. J. Moore (cornerback) (born 1987), American football player
- Damontre Moore (born 1992), American football player
- Dana Moore (born 1961), American football player
- Daniel Moore (disambiguation), multiple people
- Dante Moore (born 2005), American football player
- Darius A. Moore (1833–1905), New York politician
- Darren Moore (born 1974), English football player and coach
- Davey Moore (disambiguation)
  - Davey Moore (boxer, born 1933) (1933–1963), American world champion boxer
  - Davey Moore (boxer, born 1959) (1959–1988), American world champion boxer
- David Moore (disambiguation), multiple people
- Deacon John Moore (born 1941), American musician, singer, and bandleader
- DeAndre Moore Jr. (born 2004), American football player
- Demi Moore (born 1962), American actress
- Dennis Moore (politician) (1945–2021), American politician
- Derland Moore (1953-2010), American football player
- Derrick Moore (disambiguation), multiple people
- Devin Moore (murderer), American murderer
- Dickie Moore (actor) (1925–2015), American actor
- Dickie Moore (ice hockey) (1931–2015), Canadian ice hockey player
- Dominic Moore (born 1980), Canadian ice hockey player
- Donald Moore (disambiguation), multiple people
- Donnie Moore (1954–1989), American baseball player
- Doris Langley Moore (1902–1989), British female fashion historian
- Dorothea Rhodes Lummis Moore (1857–1942), American physician, writer, newspaper editor, activist
- Douglas Moore (1893–1969), American composer, and president, National Institute and American Academy of Arts & Letters
- Dudley Moore (1935–2002), English actor and comedian
- Dylan Moore (born 1992), American baseball player

== E–I ==
- E. Blackburn Moore (1897–1980) Speaker of the Virginia House of Delegates
- E. H. Moore (1862–1932), American mathematician
- Edward Moore (disambiguation), multiple people
- Edwin Ward Moore (1810–1865), American-born Texan commander of the Texas Navy
- Eleanor May Moore (1875–1949), Australian pacifist
- Elexie Moore, American politician from Alaska
- Elijah Moore (born 2000), American football player
- Elizabeth Moore (historian), (1894 – 1976), American local historian and preservationist
- Ellen Bryan Moore (1912–1999), Louisiana politician
- Emily Moore (footballer), (born 1998), Canadian soccer player
- Ennio Girolami (1935–2013), sometimes credited as Thomas Moore, Italian actor
- Enoch Moore (loyalist turned rebel) (1779–1841), American Revolution
- Erica Moore (born 1988), American middle-distance runner
- Esther Moore (1857–1934), English artist
- Ethel Moore (1872-1920), American civic, education, and national defense work leader
- Eva Moore (1870–1955), English actress
- Francis Daniels Moore (1913–2001), American surgeon
- Frank Moore (disambiguation), multiple people
- Fred Moore (animator) (1911-1952), animator
- Freddie Moore (1900–1992), American jazz drummer, washboarder, and singer
- Freddy Moore (1950–2022), American musician
- Frederic Moore (1830–1907), British Indian Lepidopterist
- Fredrick Moore (born 2005), American football player
- G. E. Moore (1873–1958), British philosopher
- Gareth Moore (born 1989), British rugby player
- Garry Moore (mayor) (born 1951), former mayor of Christchurch, New Zealand
- Garry Moore (1915–1993), American television host
- Gary Moore (1952–2011), Northern Irish guitarist
- Gaston Moore (born 1945), Canadian politician
- Gaston Moore (American football) (born 2002), American football player
- George Moore (disambiguation), multiple people
- Gerald Moore (disambiguation), multiple people
  - Gerald Moore (1899–1987), English classical pianist
  - Gerald Moore (journalist) (born 1938), American journalist
  - Gerald Moore (scholar) (1924–2022), English scholar
  - Gerald Moore (surgeon) (1926–2018), British oral surgeon and child actor
- Gillian Moore (headteacher), retired Australian school principal
- Gillian Moore (born 1944), English chess player
- Gordon Moore (1929–2023), American co-founder of Intel Corporation and the author of Moore's law
- Gordon Moore (Royal Navy officer) (1862–1934)
- Grace Moore (1898–1947), American soprano and actress
- Vice-Admiral Sir Graham Moore (Royal Navy officer) (1764–1843), career officer
- Greg Moore (racing driver) (1975–1999), Canadian racing driver
- Guy Borthwick Moore (1895–1918), Canadian World War I flying ace
- Gwen Moore (born 1951), US Congresswomen from Wisconsin
- Gwen Moore (California politician), (1940-2020), California state legislator
- H. Byron Moore (1839–1925), Australian horse racing official
- Hal Moore (1922–2017), American Lieutenant General in the U.S. Army
- Hannah Moore (paratriathlete) (born 1996), British paratriathlete
- Harry Moore (disambiguation), multiple people
- Harvey T. Moore (1809–1878), American politician
- Hayden Moore (born 1995), American football player
- Helen Moore (literary scholar) (born 1970), British literary scholar
- Henrietta G. Moore (1844–1940), American Universalist minister, educator, temperance activist, suffragist
- Henry Moore (1898–1986), English artist and sculptor
- Henry Moore (disambiguation), multiple people
- Henson Moore (William Henson Moore III, born 1939), American lawyer and politician, U.S. Representative from Louisiana
- Ian Moore (disambiguation), multiple people
- Irving J. Moore (1919–1993), American television director

== J–M ==
- J Strother Moore, American computer scientist
- J. Washington Moore (1866–1965), American politician
- Jackie Moore (singer) (1946–2019), American jazz singer from Florida
- Jade Moore (born 1990), English association footballer
- Jacqueline Moore (born 1964), American professional wrestler
- Jacqueline S. Moore (1926–2002), American poet
- Jalen Moore (disambiguation), multiple people
- James Moore (disambiguation), multiple people
- Jason Moore (disambiguation), multiple people
- Jaylon Moore (disambiguation), multiple people
- Jennifer Moore (1988–2006), American murder victim
- Jerrie Moore (1855–1890), Canadian baseball player
- Jerry A. Moore Jr. (1918–2017), American politician
- Jessica Moore (journalist) (born 1982), American journalist
- J'Mon Moore (born 1995), American football player
- Joe Moore (television journalist), American news anchor in Hawaii
- Joel David Moore (born 1977), American actor
- John Moore (disambiguation), multiple people
- Jonas Moore (1617–1679), English mathematician
- Jordan Moore (born 1994), Scottish footballer
- Jordan Moore (American football) (born 2002), American football player
- Joseph Moore (disambiguation), multiple people
- Juanita Moore (1914–2014), American actress
- Julianne Moore (born 1960), American actress
- Justin P. Moore (1841–1923), American mycologist
- Kamrin Moore (born 1996), American football player
- Karl Moore (academic), Canadian professor of business management
- Karl Moore (footballer) (born 1988), Irish footballer
- Kathy Wolfe Moore (born 1957), American politician
- Kayla Moore, American president of Foundation of Moral Law
- Kellen Moore (born 1988), American football player and coach
- Kendra Moore, American politician
- Kennedy Moore, American politician
- Kenny Moore II (born 1995), American football player
- Kenny Moore (1943–2022), American athlete
- Kenya Moore (born 1971), American actress, television personality and former Miss USA 1993
- Kevin Moore (born 1967), American musician
- Kip Moore (born 1980), American country music singer-songwriter
- Lecrae, (born Lecrae Moore, 1979), American Christian hip hop artist and music executive
- Leo M. Moore, American politician
- Lena L. Moore, American politician
- Lewis Baxter Moore (1866–1928) American classicist, teacher, minister
- Libby Moore (born 2001), American soccer player
- Lilian Moore (1909–2004), American author of children's books, teacher and poet
- Lindsey Moore (born 1991), American basketball player
- Lindsey Lee Moore (1892–1983), American politician from Virginia
- Lisa Moore (disambiguation), multiple people
- Lonnie R. Moore (1920-1956), United States military aviator
- Louis Moore (disambiguation), multiple people
- Lucy Moore (historian) (born 1970), historian
- Luke Moore (born 1986), English footballer
- Madge Moore (1922-2016), American aviator
- Malachi Moore (born 2001), American football player
- Mandy Moore (disambiguation), multiple people, including:
  - Mandy Moore (born 1984), American pop-singer and actress
  - Mandy Moore (choreographer) (born 1976), American dancer and choreographer
- Manfred Moore (1950–2020), American football player
- Margaret Moore (novelist), Canadian author of romance novels
- Marguerite Moore (1849–?), Irish-Catholic orator, patriot, activist
- Marianne Moore (1887–1972), American poet
- Marie Moore (born 1967), former international butterfly swimmer from Canada
- Marshall Moore (born 1970), American author
- Marshall W. Moore (1929-2022), American politician and civil engineer
- Martha Moore, birthname of Martha Ballard, American midwife and healer
- Mary Lambeth Moore (born 1958), American writer and podcaster
- Mary Tyler Moore (1936–2017), American actress and comedian
- Matt Moore (actor) (1888–1960), Irish-born American silent film actor
- Matt Moore (baseball) (born 1989), American baseball player
- Maurice Moore (disambiguation), multiple people
- May Moore or Mina Moore: see May and Mina Moore, Australian photographers
- Maya Moore (born 1989), American basketball player
- McKenzie Moore (born 1992), American player in the Israeli Basketball Premier League
- McKinley Moore (born 1998), American baseball player
- Melissa Moore (actress) (born 1963), American movie actress and equestrian
- Melissa Moore (athlete) (born 1968), Australian Olympic sprinter
- Mica Moore (born 1992), British bobsledder and sprinter
- Michael Moore (born 1954), American social critic and documentary film director
- Michael Moore (disambiguation), multiple people (Michael, Mike)
- Michel Moore, LAPD Chief
- Milcah Martha Moore (1740–1829), American poet
- Minnie Louise Moore: see May and Mina Moore (1882–1957), Australian photographers
- Mitchell Moore (1988–2009), American murder victim
- Mona Moore (1917–2000), English artist

== N–S ==
- Nathaniel Moore (disambiguation), multiple people (Nat, Nathan, Nathaniel)
- Navonda Moore (born 1984) American basketball player
- Newton Moore (1870–1936), Australian politician
- Nicholas Moore (disambiguation), multiple people
- Oliver Moore (disambiguation), multiple people
- Owen Moore (1886–1939), Irish-born American silent film actor
- Patrick Moore (1923–2012), English astronomer
- Patrick Moore (disambiguation), multiple people
- Paul Moore (disambiguation), multiple people
- Pauline Moore (1914–2002), American actress
- Peter Moore (disambiguation), multiple people
- Pippa Moore, English ballet dancer
- Powell A. Moore (1928–2018), American politician and public servant
- R. I. Moore (1941–2025), British historian and author
- Rahim Moore (born 1990), American football player
- Ramona Moore (1978–2012), American homicide victim
- Raymond Cecil Moore (1892–1974), American geologist and paleontologist
- Randle T. Moore (1874–1957), American businessman
- Ransom Asa Moore, an agronomist and professor at the University of Wisconsin-Madison
- Ransom B. Moore, California pioneer and Arizona Territory legislator
- Rebecca Moore (pageant titleholder) (born 1988), American beauty pageant winner
- Reggie Moore (1981–2023), American-born Angolan basketball player
- Richard Moore (disambiguation), multiple people (includes Richard, Rich, Dick, Dickie)
- Ricky Moore (disambiguation), multiple people
- Robert Moore (disambiguation), multiple people
- Robin Moore (1925–2008), American writer
- Rodrick Moore Jr., better known as Roddy Ricch, American rapper, singer, and songwriter
- Roger Moore (1927–2017), English actor best known for James Bond
- Roger Moore (computer scientist) (1939–2019), American computer scientist
- Romona Moore (1981–2003), American murder victim
- Ronald Moore (disambiguation), multiple people
- Rondale Moore (2000–2026), American football player
- Roy Moore (disambiguation), multiple people
  - Roy Moore (born 1947), American politician, lawyer, and jurist
- Rudy Ray Moore (1927–2008), African-American singer, comedian and cult-film maker
- Saiphin Moore, Thai chef and business owner
- Samuel Moore (disambiguation), multiple people
- Sam Walton (Samuel Moore Walton), American business magnate
- Sara Jane Moore (1930–2025), American failed assassin
- Scott Moore (disambiguation), multiple people
- Scotty Moore (1931–2016), American blues and rock guitarist
- Shannon Moore (born 1979), American professional wrestler
- Shemar Moore (born 1970), American actor
- Sherrone Moore (born 1986), American football coach
- Skai Moore (born 1995), American football player
- Sonny Moore, better known as Skrillex (born 1988), American songwriter and electronic music producer
- Spence Moore II (born 1997), American actor
- Stanton Moore (born 1972), American drummer
- Stephen Moore (disambiguation), multiple people
- Sterling Moore (born 1990), American football player
- Steve Moore (disambiguation), multiple people
- Steven Moore (disambiguation), multiple people
- Susanna Moore (born 1945), American crime writer
- Susanne Vandegrift Moore (1848–1926), American editor, publisher

== T–Z ==
- Tanya Moore (died 1986), American murder victim
- Tarvarius Moore (born 1996), American football player
- Taylor Moore (born 1997), English footballer
- Thomas Moore (disambiguation), multiple people (Thomas, Tom, Tommy)
- Thurston Moore (born 1958), American guitarist and experimental musician
- Tiffany Moore (1976–1988), American 12-year-old girl who was murdered in 1988
- T. J. Moore (born 2006), American football player
- Tracey Moore (born 1960), Canadian voice actress
- Trevor Moore (disambiguation), multiple people
- Tyria Moore (born 1965), involved with American serial killer Aileen Wuornos
- Vinnie Moore (born 1964), American musician
- Walter Moore (disambiguation), multiple people
- Walthall M. Moore (1886–1960), American politician, black state representative in Missouri
- Warren "Pete" Moore (1938–2017), singer
- Wendell Moore (disambiguation), multiple people
- Wes Moore (born 1978), 63rd and incumbent Governor of Maryland
- Whistlin' Alex Moore (1899–1989), American blues pianist, singer and whistler
- Wilcy Moore (1897–1963), American baseball player
- Wild Bill Moore (1918–1983), tenor saxophone player
- Will Moore (gridiron football) (born 1970), American football wide receiver
- William Moore (disambiguation), multiple people
- Willie Moore (Cork hurler) (1931–2003), Irish hurler for Cork
- Willie Moore (Limerick hurler) (born 1950), Irish hurler for Limerick
- Zephaniah Swift Moore (1770–1823), American clergyman and educator

== Other people ==
- Moore Brothers (disambiguation)

== Fictional characters ==
- Olivia Moore, a character in the TV series iZombie
- Rachel Moore, a character in the anime and manga Case Closed
- Richard Moore, a character from the detective manga and anime series Case Closed
