= Elizabeth Moore =

Elizabeth Moore may refer to:

- Elisabeth Moore (1876–1959), American tennis champion
- Elizabeth Moore Aubin, American diplomat
- Elisabeth Luce Moore (1903–2002), American philanthropist, educator, and volunteer
- Elizabeth Moore (educator) (1832–1930), seminary principal in West Virginia
- Betty R. Moore (born 1934), Australian athlete who ran for Great Britain
- Beth Moore (born 1957), founder of Living Proof Ministries, an evangelical Christian organization for women
- Elizabeth Moore (historian) (1894–1976), American local historian
