= Charles W. Moore =

Charles W. Moore may refer to:

- Charles Moore (architect), American architect and educator
- Charles W. Moore (American football), American football coach and player
- Charles W. Moore Jr., U.S. Navy admiral

== See also ==
- Charles Moore (disambiguation)
