= Samuel Moore =

Samuel Moore may refer to:

== Politicians ==
- Samuel B. Moore (1789–1846), governor of Alabama
- Samuel M. Moore (1796–1875), U.S. representative from Virginia
- Samuel Edward Moore (1803–1849), Western Australian politician
- Samuel Moore (colonial official) (1630–1688), New Jersey politician
- Samuel Moore (congressman) (1774–1861), U.S. representative from Pennsylvania
- Samuel Wilkinson Moore (1854–1935), New South Wales parliamentarian and minister
- Sam Moore (Georgia politician) (born 1976), member of the Georgia House of Representatives
- Samuel Joseph Fortescue Moore, member of the Western Australian Legislative Assembly in the early 1900s
- Sam Crowther Moore (1870–1926), British socialist activist

== Sportspeople ==
- Sam Moore (gridiron football) (born 1964), American player of gridiron football
- Sammy Moore (born 1987), English footballer
- Sammy Moore (water polo) (1900–1989), Irish water polo player
- Sam Moore (rugby union) (born 1998), rugby union player

== Other people ==
- Sam Moore (1935–2025), singer from the soul duo Sam & Dave
- Sam Moore (publisher) (1929–2018), CEO of Thomas Nelson
- Samuel P. Moore (1813–1889), U.S. Army doctor and Confederate Army surgeon general
- Samuel Preston Moore (1710–1785), American physician and public official
- Samuel N. Moore (1891–1942), U.S. Navy officer, namesake for the destroyer USS Samuel N. Moore
  - USS Samuel N. Moore
- Samuel Moore (Quaker leader) (1742–1821), early Quaker leader in Maritime Canada
- Samuel J. Moore (1859–1948), Canadian businessman, founder of Moore Business Forms
- Samuel Moore (translator) (1838–1911), translator of the 1887 English edition of Das Kapital

== See also ==
- Samuel More (1593–1662), landowner
- Samuel More (apothecary) (1726–1799)
- Samuel More (MP), member of parliament (MP) for Shropshire
