= DJ (disambiguation) =

DJ, or disc jockey, is a person who plays recorded music for an audience.

DJ may also refer to:

== Businesses ==
- Dow Jones Industrial Average, a stock market index
- Dansk Jernbane, a Danish freight company
- David Jones (department store), an Australian retailer
- Virgin Blue (IATA code DJ), Australia-based airline prior to rebranding as Virgin Australia
- Disney Jr., formerly known as Disney Junior

== In arts and entertainment ==
=== Fictional characters ===
- DJ (Cars), a character from the Pixar franchise Cars
- DJ (comics), a Marvel character
- DJ Conner, a Roseanne character
- D.J. Tanner, a Full House character
- Dee Jay, a Street Fighter character
- D.J., on the TV series The O.C.
- DJ, a Rang De Basanti character
- DJ (Transformers), one of the Jointron Brothers
- Dee-Jay (G.I. Joe), a Battleforce 2000 character in the G.I. Joe universe
- DJ (Star Wars), character from the 2017 Star Wars film The Last Jedi, played by actor Benicio Del Toro
- DJ, a character in the Total Drama series
- DJay, the protagonist in the film Hustle & Flow
- Dustin James "D.J." Walters, the protagonist of the film Monster House

=== Music ===
- "DJ" (Alphabeat song), 2009
- "DJ" (David Bowie song), 1979
- "DJ" (H & Claire song), 2002
- "DJ" (Jamelia song), 2004
- "DJ" (Marianta Pieridi song), 2006
- D'Jais, D'Jais Bar & Grill, a popular dance club and restaurant in Belmar, New Jersey, USA
- Deejay (Jamaican), a type of reggae or dancehall rapper
- Dell Digital Jukebox, a digital audio player
- "DJ", a song by Amanda Blank on the album I Love You
- "DJ", a song by NCT 127 from Ay-Yo (2023)
- "DJ", a song by Sunidhi Chauhan ft. Ali Zafar, for the 2015 film Hey Bro
- "DJ Song", a song by Miss Kittin & The Hacker from First Album

=== In other media ===
- DJ Magazine, a British monthly magazine
- Disc Jockey, a 1951 film starring Ginny Simms, Tom Drake, George Shearing and Sarah Vaughan
- DJ: Duvvada Jagannadham, a 2017 Indian Telugu-language film

== In language ==
- Đ (D with stroke), a letter in several alphabets
- đ, a representation of the digraph ⟨dj⟩ in some versions of Gaj's Latin alphabet

== People ==
- DJ Ashba (born 1972), American musician, producer, and songwriter
- D. J. Augustin (born 1987), American basketball player
- DJ Brewton (born 2000), American basketball player in the Israeli Basketball Premier League
- DJ Burks, American football player
- DJ Campbell (born 1981), English footballer
- D. J. Carey (born 1970), Irish hurler
- D. J. Cooper (born 1990), American basketball player in the Israeli Basketball Premier League
- D. J. Dale (born 2000), American football player
- DJ Davidson (born 1997), American football player
- DJ Delorie, software developer
- DJ Gasso (born 1995), American softball coach
- D. J. Herman (born 2002), American football player
- DJ Horne (born 2000), American college basketball player
- D. J. Ivey (born 2000), American football player
- D. J. Johnson, disambiguation page
- DJ LeMahieu (born 1988), American baseball player
- DJ McKinney (born 2004), American football player
- D. J. Moore (disambiguation), multiple people
- D.J. Peterson (1959–1993), former American professional wrestler
- D. J. Peterson (baseball) (born 1991), American baseball player
- DJ Pickett, American football player
- DJ Pryor, American stand-up comedian and actor
- DJ Qualls (born 1978), American actor
- D. J. Seeley (born 1989), American basketball player
- DJ Steward (born 2001), American basketball player
- DJ Stewart (born 1993), American baseball player
- D.J. Stewart Jr. (born 1999), American basketball player
- DJ Thomas-Jones (born 2002), American football player
- D. J. Turner (cornerback) (born 2000), American football player
- D. J. Turner (wide receiver) (born 1997), American football player
- DJ Uiagalelei (born 2001), American football player
- DJ Vonnahme (born 2006), American football player
- D. J. Woods (born 1989), American football player

== Places ==
- Djibouti, ISO 3166-1 country code
  - .dj, a top-level domain for Djibouti
- Dolj County, Romania, abbreviated DJ on car number plates

== In science and technology ==
- Decijoule, a measurement of energy
- Deterministic jitter, a telecommunications term
- Jeep DJ, a two-wheel-drive variant of the CJ series

== Other uses ==
- Declaratory judgment, a type of court ruling that seeks to clarify legal context
- Deutsches Jungvolk, the junior section of the Hitler Youth for boys from 10 to 14 years old
- Dinner jacket, a suit also known as a tuxedo
- DJ Mag 100, an annual ranking poll for DJs by DJ Magazine
- Dust jacket, the detachable outer cover of a book, with folded flaps

== See also ==
- Deejay (disambiguation)
- Djay (disambiguation)
- DJ & the Fro, an animated series that aired on MTV
