= Lewis Moore =

Lewis Moore may refer to:

- Lewis Moore (footballer) (born 1998), Scottish footballer
- Lewis H. Moore (born 1958), American politician, member of the Oklahoma House of Representatives
- Lewis Baxter Moore (1866–1928), American classicist, scholar, and Presbyterian pastor
- Lou Moore (Lewis Henry Moore, 1904–1956), American racing driver and team owner

== See also ==
- Louis Moore (disambiguation)
- Kapron Lewis-Moore (born 1990), American football player
