= Samuel Preston Moore =

Samuel Preston Moore may refer to:

- Samuel Preston Moore (1710–1785), physician and public official
- Samuel P. Moore (1813–1889), Confederate surgeon general
