= Richard More =

Richard More may refer to:

- Richard More (cricketer), English cricketer and colonial administrator
- Richard More (fl.1402), probably Richard More, MP for Plympton Erle in 1402
- Richard More (died 1595), MP for Grantham and Plympton Erle
- Richard More (died 1635), MP
- Richard More (died 1698), MP for Bishop's Castle
- Richard More (Parliamentarian) (1576–1643), English landowner and politician
- Richard More (Mayflower passenger) (1614–c. 1694/96)
- Richard More (priest) (fl. 1505–1515), archdeacon of Exeter

== See also ==
- Richard de la More, medieval clergyman
- Richard Moore (disambiguation)
