= Gerald Moore (disambiguation) =

Gerald Moore (1899–1987) was an English pianist.

Gerald Moore may also refer to:

- Gerald Moore (journalist) (born 1938), American journalist
- Gerald Moore (scholar) (1924–2022), English scholar
- Gerald Moore (surgeon) (1926–2018), British oral surgeon and child actor
- G.T. Moore (Gerald Thomas Moore, born 1949), English singer, composer and multi-instrumentalist
- Gerry Moore (Gerald Asher Moore, 1903–1993), English jazz pianist
