= David Moore =

David Moore or Dave Moore may refer to:

== Politics ==
- David E. Moore (1798-1875), American politician in Virginia
- David Moore (Australian politician) (1824–1898), politician in Sandridge, Victoria, Australia
- David Moore (Manx politician), member of the House of Keys, 1978–1986
- David H. Moore (born 1966), member of the Chicago City Council
- David R. Moore (1856–1926), physician and political figure in New Brunswick, Canada

== Science ==
- David Moore (botanist born 1808) (1808–1879), Scottish botanist
- David Moore (botanist born 1933) (1933–2013), English botanist
- David Moore (psychologist) (born 1960), American psychologist
- David Moore (biologist) (born 1952), American molecular biologist
- David Cresap Moore (1925–2001), American historian

== Sports ==
- David Moore (footballer, born 1959), English former footballer, football manager and physiotherapist
- D. J. Moore (cornerback) (David James Moore, born 1987), American football player
- David Moore (wide receiver) (born 1995), American football player
- David Moore (cricket coach) (born 1964), Australian cricketer and coach
- David Moore (footballer, born 1985), English former football striker
- David Mead (rugby league) (David Moore, born 1988), Papua New Guinean rugby league footballer
- David Moore (rugby union) (born 1987), rugby union player
- David Moore (sport shooter) (born 1953), Australian pistol shooter and Olympic athlete
- Davey Moore (boxer, born 1933) (1933–1963), American boxer
- Dave Moore (tight end) (David Edward Moore, born 1969), American football tight end
- Dave Moore (basketball) (born 1975), American college basketball coach
- David Moore (runner) (born 1967), American middle-distance runner, 1990 800 m All-American for the Pittsburgh Panthers track and field team

== Other ==
- David Moore (military officer) (1817–1893), American military officer
- Dave Moore (newscaster) (1924–1998), American newscaster on Minnesota television
- David Moore (Australian photographer) (1927–2003), Australian photojournalist
- Dave Moore (singer-songwriter) (born 1951), American singer, songwriter and instrumentalist based in Iowa
- David Moore (British photographer) (born 1961)
- Dave Moore (motorsport commentator) (born 1966), television motorsport commentator
- David Moore (restaurateur) (born 1964), restaurateur in the UK
- David Hastings Moore (1838–1915), American bishop of the Methodist Episcopal Church
- D. C. Moore (born 1980), British playwright
- David J. Moore, American businessman
- David S. Moore, American statistician
- David Barclay Moore, American filmmaker and writer

== See also ==
- Davey Moore (disambiguation)
- David More, Scottish botanical illustrator
- David Moor, British general practitioner
