= Charles Mohr =

Charles or Charlie Mohr may refer to:

- Charles T. Mohr (1824–1901), German-born American author of botanical studies
- Charles Mohr (journalist) (1929–1989), American reporter for Time and The New York Times
- Charlie Mohr (1938–1960), American middleweight whose death terminated college boxing

== See also ==
- Charles Moore (disambiguation)
