= Jalen Moore =

Jalen Moore may refer to:

- Jalen Moore (basketball, born 1995), American basketball player from Utah
- Jalen Moore (basketball, born 1999), American basketball player who plays for a Kosovar team

== See also ==
- List of people with surname Moore
