= Djay =

Djay may refer to:

- Djay Brawner (born 1981), American music video, film, and television director
- djay (software), a digital music mixing software
- DJay, a character in Hustle & Flow

== See also ==
- DJ (disambiguation)
- Deejay (disambiguation)
