= Donald Moore =

Donald Moore may refer to:

- Donald Willard Moore (1891–1994), Black Canadian civil rights activist
- Don W. Moore (1904–1986), American comics writer and screenwriter
- Dudey Moore (Donald W. Moore, 1910–1984), American basketball player and coach
- Don A. Moore (politician) (1928–2012), American judge, lawyer, and politician in Illinois
- Don Moore (politician) (1928–2017), American politician, member of the Tennessee House of Representative and Tennessee Senate
- Don Moore (musician) (1938–2025), American jazz bassist
- Donnie Moore (1954–1989), American baseball pitcher
- Don A. Moore (academic) (born 1970), American academic
- Matt Moore (politician) (Donald Matthew Moore, born 1982), American political strategist
