= Shaw Blackmon =

American politician from Georgia

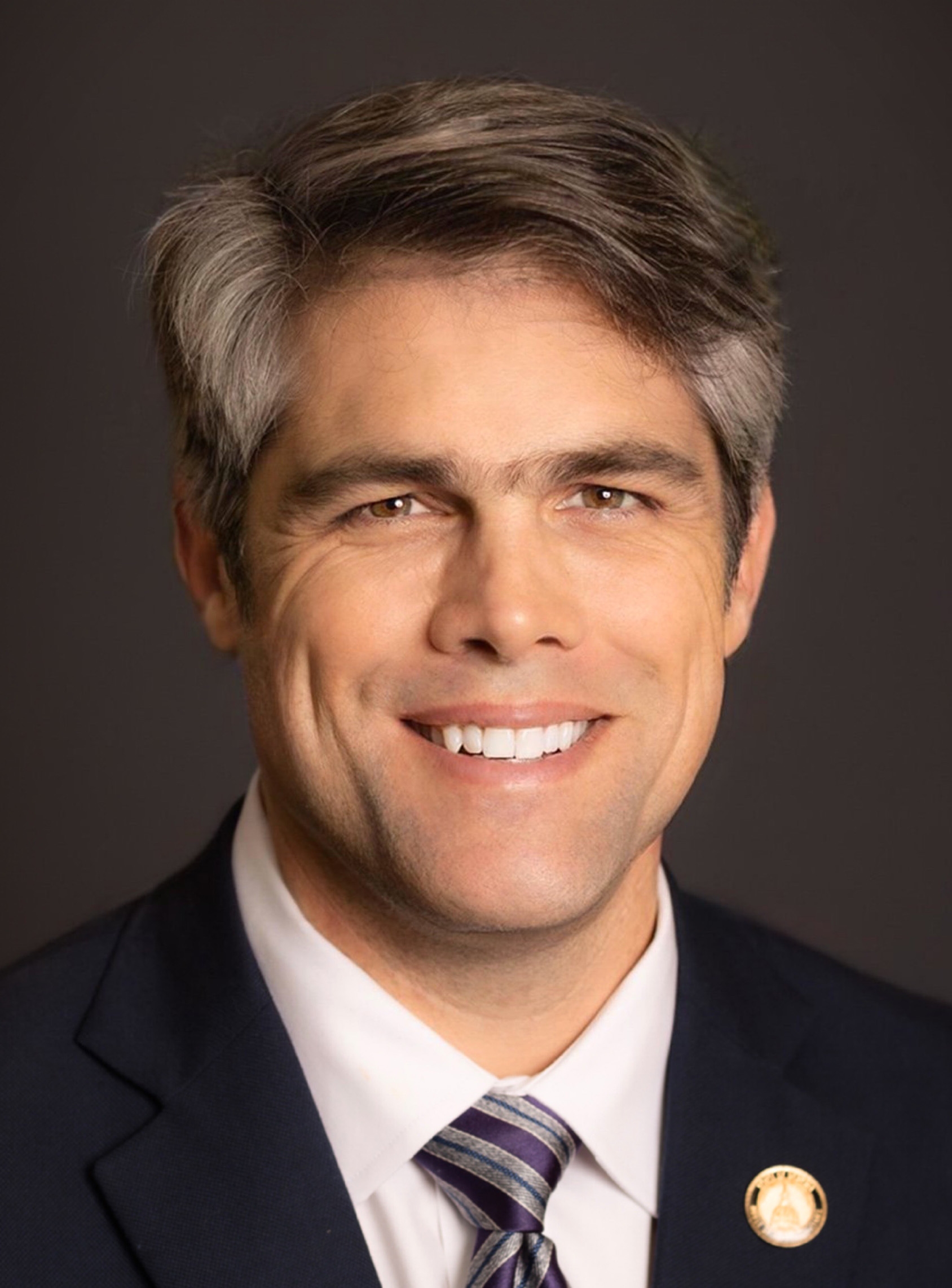
- Official headshot

Member of the Georgia House of Representatives from the 146th district
- Incumbent
- Assumed office August 20, 2015
- Preceded by: Larry O'Neal

Personal details
- Born: Zell Shaw Blackmon; May 27, 1973 (age 53) Florida, U.S.
- Party: Republican
- Education: University of Georgia

Zell Shaw Blackmon (born May 27, 1973) is an American politician serving as a Republican member of the Georgia House of Representatives from the 146th district since 2015.

== Biography ==
Born in Florida, Blackmon and his family moved to Warner Robins, Georgia when Blackmon was six weeks old. He graduated from Warner Robins High School, winning a golf state championship, and went to the University of Georgia on a golf scholarship where he was a four-year letterman. He graduated with a degree in Management Information Systems. He moved back to Warner Robins after graduating and worked for his father's company, National Bank Products, as a salesman. He eventually became president and CEO of the company.

== Gallery ==
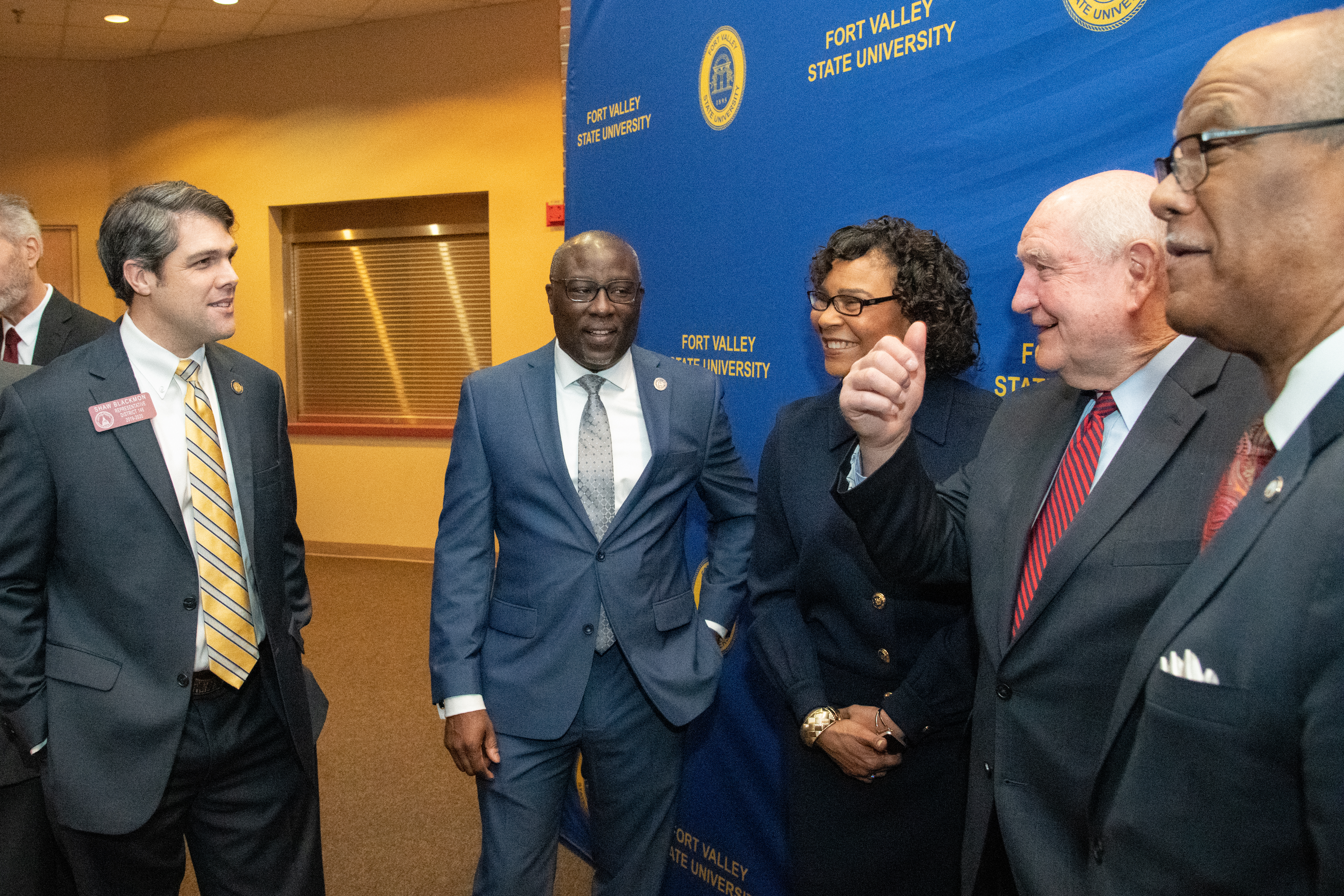
Blackmon with U.S. Secretary of Agriculture (USDA) Secretary Sonny Perdue meet and other leaders at the Fort Valley State University (FVSU) Ham and Egg Legislative Breakfast (2019)
