= D. J. Moore (disambiguation) =

D. J. Moore (born 1997 as Denniston Oliver Moore Jr.) is U.S. American football wide receiver.

D. J. Moore may also refer to:

== Sports ==
- D. J. Moore (cornerback) (born 1987 as David James Moore), U.S. American football cornerback
- David Moore (wide receiver) (born 1995 as David James Moore), U.S. American football wide receiver
- David Moore (cricket coach) (born 1964 as David John Arthur Moore), Australian cricketer and coach

== Other ==
- David J. Moore, U.S. businessman
- Deacon John Moore (born 1941), U.S. musician
- Dudley Moore (1935–2002, born Dudley Stuart John Moore), UK actor

== See also ==
- List of people with surname Moore
- Moore (disambiguation)
- DJ (disambiguation)
