= Elizabeth Moore Hall =

- U.S. National Register of Historic Places
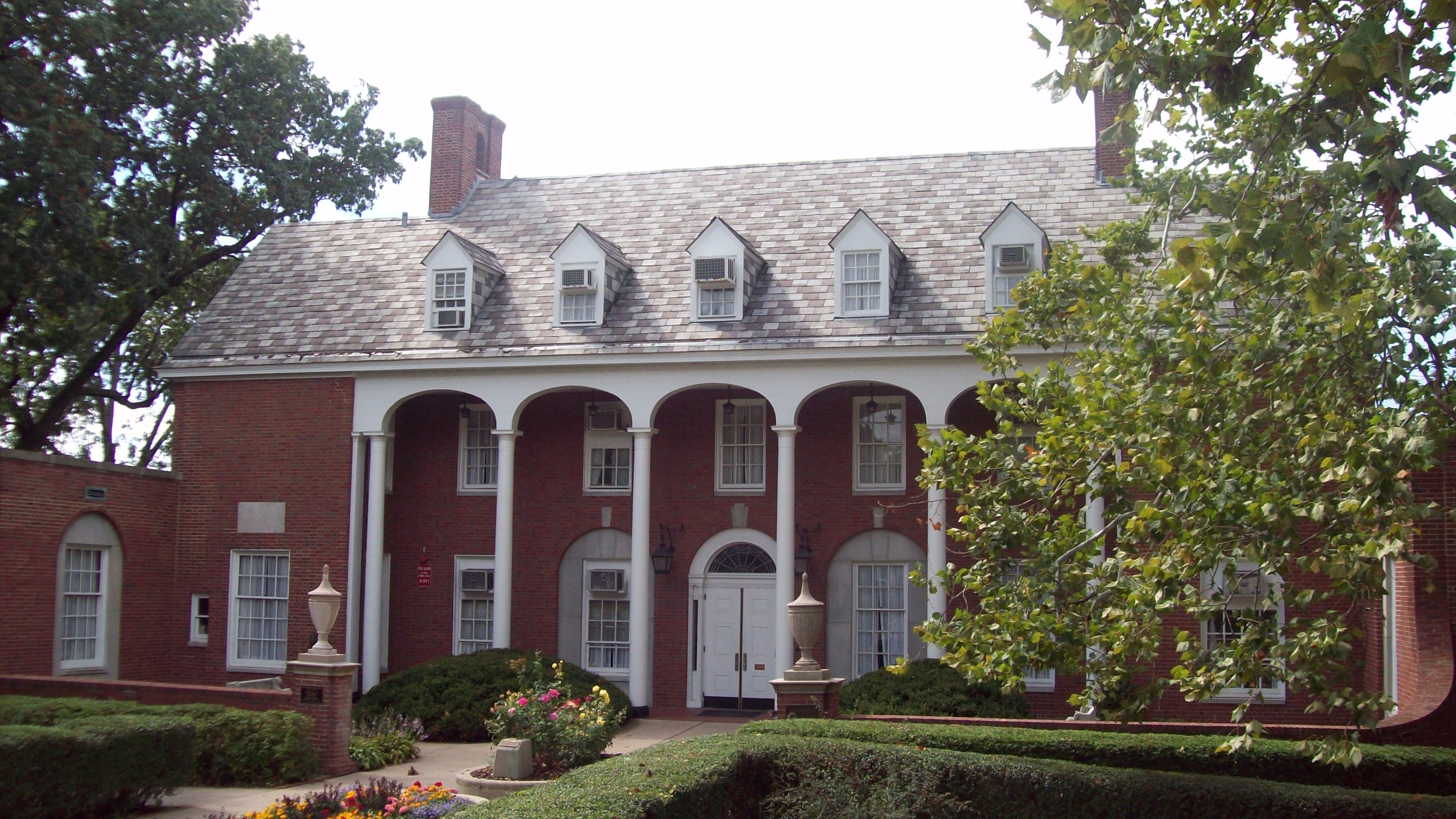
- Elizabeth Moore Hall, September 2012

- Location within West Virginia Location within the United States
- Location: University Ave., Morgantown, West Virginia
- Coordinates: 39°38′6″N 79°57′20″W
- Area: 0.5 acres (0.20 ha)
- Built: 1926
- Architect: David, Dunlap & Barney
- Architectural style: Colonial Revival, Other, Georgian Revival
- MPS: West Virginia University Neo-Classical Revival Buildings TR
- NRHP reference No.: 85003208
- Added to NRHP: December 19, 1985

Elizabeth Moore Hall is a historic women's physical education building associated with West Virginia University and located in Morgantown, Monongalia County, West Virginia. It was built between 1926 and 1928, and is a three-story, red brick building with Georgian Revival detailing. An addition was completed in 1962. It has a slate covered gable roof. The front facade features five arches supported by six Doric order columns. It also has balconies with cast iron balustrades. The building is named for Elizabeth Moore, principal of Woodburn Female Seminary from 1865 to 1866.

The building currently houses the offices for the dean of students and the Dance Program in the School of Theatre & Dance. With offices in the front part of the building, the back section is over six stories tall and has three levels: a swimming pool, a gymnasium (G1), and a dance studio (210).

It was listed on the National Register of Historic Places in 1985.

== See also ==
- National Register of Historic Places listings at colleges and universities in the United States
