= Maurice Kilgore =

American bowler

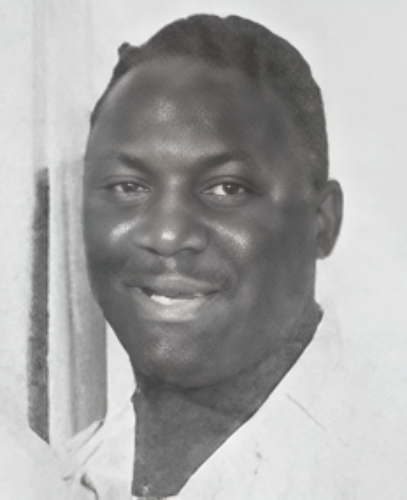

Personal information
- Born: c. 1920 Detroit, Michigan
- Years active: 1950s

Sport
- Country: United States
- Sport: Ten-pin bowling

Maurice Kilgore was an American bowler, notable for being the first African American bowler to compete in a nationally televised tournament. He was also a member of the first team of African American bowlers to play in an American Bowling Congress tournament, a milestone that has been credited with breaking the color barrier in bowling.

== Career ==
Kilgore was born around 1920 and grew up in Detroit. In the early 1900s, Detroit was credited with having an unusually large and active African American bowling community.

In 1950, Kilgore won a National Singles Championship in bowling. Until that year (or the following one), the American Bowling Congress, which organized bowling tournaments and frequently broadcast the sport nationally on television, had a whites only clause which forbade nonwhite athletes from competing in its bowling tournaments. A few years after that clause was repealed, the first team of African American bowlers to compete in an American Bowling Congress tournament was the Allen Supermarket team composed of the bowlers Maurice Kilgore, Lafayette Allen Jr., Lavert Griffin, Bill Rhodman, and Clarence W. Williams Jr. They broke this record by competing in a tournament in Saint Paul, Minnesota. Because of this milestone, the team has been credited with helping to break the color barrier in bowling. Two of Kilgore's teammates became members of the United States Bowling Congress Hall of Fame.

In 1953, the Cleveland Courier named Kilgore part of its "all star team" of the nation's best African American bowlers.

In 1958, Kilgore competed with the Chicago bowler Stan Gifford at the Faetz-Niesen Bowling Alley in a game broadcast nationally as part of an American Bowling Congress television program. This made him the first African American bowler to compete in a nationwide television broadcast.

As of 1958, Kilgore had long been active in the National Bowling Association, and he had a 209 average in Motor City's Michigan Chronicle League. In 1959, he held the national all-time record for a 3-game cumulative score of 789, and by that time was averaging 202 points per game.

By 1960, Kilgore had become a feature in the bowling scene of Chicago. Kilgore's accomplishments were document by the historian Louis Moore in his 2017 book We Will Win the Day: the Civil Rights Movement, the Black Athlete, and the Quest for Equality.
