= Georgia's 146th House of Representatives district =

State district in Georgia, USA

Georgia's 146th State House of Representatives district
Representative
Shaw Blackmon; R–Bonaire
- Demographics: 61.4% White; 25.5% Black; 6.1% Hispanic; 3.8% Asian
- Population: 58,085

District 146 elects one member of the Georgia House of Representatives. It contains parts of Houston County.

== Members ==
- Jerry Keen (until 2001)
- Larry O'Neal (2001–2015)
- Shaw Blackmon (since 2025)
