= Deejay (disambiguation) =

A deejay or disc jockey is a person who hosts recorded music for an audience.

Deejay may also refer to:

- DeeJay TV, an Italian entertainment channel
- Deejay (Jamaican music), a person who verbalizes with music in the Jamaican style
- Deejay Kriel (born 1995), South African professional boxer
- Dee Jay, a fictional character in the Street Fighter series

== See also ==
- DJ (disambiguation)
- Djay (disambiguation)
