= Louis Moore =

Louis Moore may refer to:

- Louis Moore (American football) (born 2001), American football player
- Louis Moore (historian), American historian
- Louis T. Moore (1885–1961), preservationist, author, historian, photographer, and civic promoter

== See also ==
- Lewis Moore (disambiguation)
