= Nathaniel Moore =

Nat, Nathan, or Nathaniel Moore may refer to:

- Nathaniel Moore (golfer) (1884–1910), American Olympic golfer
- Nat Moore (born 1951), American football player
- Nathan Moore (American musician) (born 1970), American musician of ThaMuseMeant and Surprise Me Mr. Davis
- Nathan Moore (English musician) (born 1965), English singer, member of Brother Beyond
- Nathaniel Fish Moore (1782–1872), president of Columbia College
- Nathaniel G. Moore (born 1974), Canadian writer
- Nathan A. Moore (born 1970), United States Coast Guard admiral
- Nathaniel Moore (politician), Trinidad and Tobago politician

== Places ==
- Nathan G. Moore House
- Nathaniel Moore Banta House
