= Charles Moore =

Charles Moore may refer to:

== Arts and entertainment ==
- Charles Herbert Moore (1840–1930), American artist and historian
- Charles R. Moore (actor) (1893–1947), American actor
- Charles Moore (dancer) (1928–1986), founder of the Charles Moore Dance Theatre
- Charles Moore (photographer) (1931–2010), American photographer who documented the Civil Rights Era
- Charles Moore (architect) (1925–1993), American architect

== Journalism ==
- Charles Moore (city planner) (1855–1942), journalist and city planner in Detroit, Michigan
- Charles Moore, Baron Moore of Etchingham (born 1956), British journalist, former editor of The Spectator, The Sunday Telegraph and The Daily Telegraph

== Politics ==
- Charles Moore, Viscount Moore (1676–1714), member of the Irish parliament for Drogheda
- Charles Moore, 2nd Viscount Moore of Drogheda (1603–1643), Irish aristocrat
- Charles Moore, 1st Earl of Charleville (1712–1764), Irish peer
- Charles Moore, 1st Marquess of Drogheda (1730–1821), British peer and military officer
- Charles Moore, 2nd Marquess of Drogheda (1770–1837), Irish peer
- Charles Moore (English politician) (1771–1826), member of parliament 1799–1802, 1802–1806 and 1807–1812
- Charles Moore (Irish MP) (1804–1869), Irish politician, member of parliament for Tipperary 1865–1869
- Charles Moore (Australian politician) (1820–1895), New South Wales parliamentarian and mayor of Sydney
- Charles S. Moore (1857–1915), American politician in Oregon
- Charles C. Moore (1866–1958), governor of Idaho
- C. Ellis Moore (1884–1941), U.S. representative from Ohio
- Charles Moore, 11th Earl of Drogheda (1910–1989), British peer
- Charles M. Moore (1923–1991), American politician in Maryland

== Science ==
- Charles B. Moore (1920–2010), American meteorologist and balloonist
- Charles J. Moore, oceanographer, environmentalist and racing yacht captain
- Charles Moore (botanist) (1820–1905), director of the Royal Botanic Gardens, Sydney
- Charles Moore (geologist) (1815–1881), English geologist

== Sports ==
- Charles Moore (hurdler) (1929–2020), American Olympic hurdler
- Charles Harold Moore (born c. 1832), English one-legged swimmer.
- Chuck Moore (American football) (born 1940), former American football offensive lineman
- Charles W. Moore (American football) (c. 1939/1940–2024), American football coach and player

== Technology ==
- Charles H. Moore (born 1938), inventor of the Forth programming language
- Charles R. Moore (computer engineer) (1961–2012), chief engineer of the PowerPC 601 microprocessor

== Other ==
- Charles Leonard Moore (1854–1925), lawyer and poet born in Philadelphia
- Charles Napoleon Moore (1882–1967), American mathematician at Bowling Green State University
- Charles A. Moore (1901–1967), American professor of comparative philosophy
- Charles E. Moore (1894–1953), American industrialist
- Charles R. Moore (minister) (1934–2014), American Methodist minister
- Charles Chilton Moore (1837–1906), American atheist and newspaper editor
- Charles Page Thomas Moore (1831–1904), joint founder of Phi Kappa Psi fraternity
- Charles W. Moore Jr. (born 1946), U.S. Navy admiral
- Charles Brainard Taylor Moore (1853–1923), U.S. Navy admiral and governor of American Samoa
- Charles Johnes Moore (1889–1974), U.S. Navy admiral
- Charles L. Moore (born 1966), United States Air Force general
- Charles Moore and Co., Australian department store chain

== See also ==
- Charlie Moore (disambiguation)
