= Lisa Moore =

Lisa Moore may refer to:

- Lisa Moore (musician) (born 1960), Australian classical musician
- Lisa Moore (writer) (born 1964), Canadian writer
- Lisa Bronwyn Moore (1965–1989), Canadian actress
- Lisa C. Moore, American publisher and editor
- Lisa Jean Moore (born 1967), professor of sociology and gender studies
- Lisa L. Moore, Canadian-American academic
- Lisa Schulte Moore, American landscape ecologist
- Lisa Moore (figure skater), American pairs figure skater, see 2006 United States Figure Skating Championships
- Lisa Moore, a character in the American comic strip Funky Winkerbean
