= Albert Moore =

Albert Moore may refer to:

- Albert Joseph Moore (1841–1893), English painter
- T. Albert Moore (1860–1940), 5th Moderator of United Church of Canada
- Albert Moore (marine) (1862–1916), US Marine
- Albert Moore (footballer, born 1863) (1863–?), English football player for Notts County
- Albert Moore (footballer, born 1898) (1898–?), English football player for Stoke
- Al Moore (baseball) (1902–1974), baseball player
- Al Moore (American football) (1908–1991), American football player

== See also ==
- Al Moore (disambiguation)
