= Odette Tchernine =

British author and journalist (c. 1897–1992)

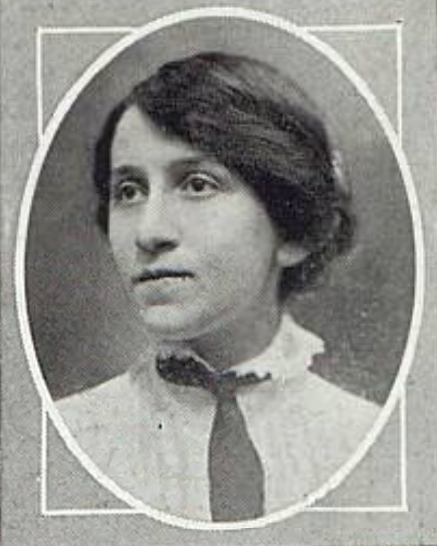
- Born: c. 1897; Paris
- Died: 1992
- Occupations: Author, journalist

Odette Tchernine (c. 1897–1992) was a British author, cryptozoologist, novelist and journalist.

== Biography ==
Tchernine was born in Paris to a Russian financier father, Dimitri Tchernine (Dmitry Chernin), and a French mother, Yvonne, from Toulouse. She grew up in Kensington. She had a younger brother, Serge Tchernine. Her second novel, published in 1922, was about the Australian bush.

== Cryptozoology ==
Tchernine is best known for writing several books on the abominable snowman or yeti, such as In Pursuit of the Abominable Snowman, Taplinger Publishing, 1971. Before In Pursuit, she published The Snowman and Company. Initially a socialite and novelist, she earned a reputation from the 1950s through the 1970s "as one of Britain's most formidable monster hunters."

Tchernine's books on the yeti were criticized by academics. Richard Carrington wrote that the treatment of the yeti in Tchernine's The Snowman and Company is uncritical and she presented no reliable evidence for its existence. He concluded that the book was well written but only the credulous or romantic reader will find it entertaining. Christoph von Fürer-Haimendorf stated that Tchernine's data on the yeti that she took from Russian sources are too contradictory and vague to be regarded as reliable evidence.

Tchernine's In Pursuit of the Abominable Snowman was negatively reviewed by Jane M. Oppenheimer who commented that the evidence collected for the yeti was mostly taken from dubious Russian sources which are anecdotal or suggestive and that a specialist will demand much stronger evidence.

== Selected publications ==
- Thou Shalt Not Fail (1916)
- Explorers' and Travellers' Tales (1958)
- The Snowman and Company (with a foreword by Eric Shipton, 1961)
- Explorers Remember (1967)
- The Yeti (1970)
- In Pursuit of the Abominable Snowman (1971)
- The Singing Dust (1976, with Gerald Moore)
