= Moore Brothers =

The Moore Brothers were three Irish born brothers who became famous in the motion picture business in early Hollywood.

- Tom Moore (actor) (1883–1955)
- Owen Moore (1886–1939)
- Matt Moore (actor) (1888–1960)

== See also ==
- List of people with surname Moore
