= Larry O'Neal =

American politician

Member of the Georgia House of Representatives from the 146th district
- In office 2001–2015
- Preceded by: Jerry Keen
- Succeeded by: Shaw Blackmon

Personal details
- Born: May 5, 1949 (age 77) Jacksonville, Florida, U.S.
- Party: Republican

Larry O'Neal (born May 5, 1949) is an American politician from Georgia. O'Neal is a Republican member of the Georgia House of Representatives from the 146th district, serving since 2001.

== See also ==
- 2013 - 152nd Georgia General Assembly
