= Richard Moore =

Richard, Rich, Dick, Dickie, or Dicky Moore may refer to:

== Entertainment ==
- Richard O. Moore (1920–2015), American poet
- Dickie Moore (actor) (1925–2015), American actor, child actor in Our Gang
- Richard Moore (cinematographer) (1925–2009), American cinematographer and founder of Panavision
- Richard Moore (actor) (born 1942), English actor who played Jarvis Skelton on ITV's Emmerdale
- Rich Moore (born 1963), American animation director
- Richard Moore (comics) (born 1966), American comic book writer and creator
- Dicky Moore (born 1978), English guitarist with Scintillate and Scritti Politti
- Richard Moore (Case Closed) (Kogoro Mori), detective in the anime and manga Case Closed
- Father Richard Moore, priest in the film The Exorcism of Emily Rose

== Politics ==
- Richard Moore (governor), first Governor of Bermuda, 1612–1616
- Richard Moore (Irish politician) (1725–1761), Irish Member of Parliament for Clonmel, 1761
- Richard Moore (radical) (1810–1878), English Chartist
- Richard Moore (New Zealand politician) (1849–1936), New Zealand Member of Parliament
- Richard B. Moore (1893–1978), Barbadian civil rights activist and communist
- Richard A. Moore (1914–1995), United States Ambassador to Ireland, 1989–1992
- Richard Moore (Liberal politician) (1931–2019), British journalist and political aide
- Richard T. Moore (born 1943), American politician, former member of the Massachusetts State Senate
- Richard H. Moore (born 1960), American politician, North Carolina State Treasurer
- Richard Lee Moore (born 1971), American politician, North Carolina House of Representatives
- Richard Moore (Australian politician) (1878–1966), Mayor of Kalgoorlie, member of the Western Australian Legislative Council

== Religion ==
- Richard Moore (Roman Catholic priest) (fl. 1402), Irish Archdeacon of Armagh
- Richard Channing Moore (1762–1841), American Episcopal Bishop of Virginia
- Richard Moore (Church of Ireland priest) (died 1818), Dean of Emly

== Sports ==
- Dick Moore (cricketer) (1913–2002), English cricketer
- Dickie Moore (ice hockey) (1931–2015), Canadian ice hockey player and Hockey Hall of Fame member
- Richie Moore (born 1945), American basketball player
- Rich Moore (American football) (born 1947), American football player
- Richard Moore (rugby league) (born 1981), English rugby league player
- Rick Moore (born 1989), English cricketer
- Richard Moore (racing driver) (born 1991), racing driver from New Zealand

== Other ==
- Richard Moore (Irish lawyer) (1783–1857), Irish lawyer and judge
- Richard Moore (abolitionist) (1793–1874), American abolitionist and Underground Railroad stationmaster
- Richard Moore (sailor) (1910–2005), American sailor
- Dick Moore (Royal Navy officer) (1916–2003), British Royal Navy officer awarded the George Cross in World War II
- Richard Moore (engineer) (1923–2012), professor of computer and electrical engineering at the University of Kansas
- Richard W. Moore (born 1952), American lawyer and government official
- Richard Moore (journalist) (1972–2022), British journalist and author
- Richard Moore (diplomat) (born 1963), British diplomat
- Richard V. Moore (1906–1994), American educator and president of Bethune-Cookman College
- Richard Bernard Moore (1965–2024), American man executed in South Carolina

== See also ==
- Freddy Moore (1950–2022), singer-songwriter known as Rick "Skogie" Moore
- Ricky Moore (disambiguation)
- Rickie D. Moore, theologian
- Richard More (disambiguation)
