= Paul Moore =

Paul Moore may refer to:

- Paul Moore Sr. (1886–1959), American businessman
- Paul Moore Jr. (1919–2003), bishop of the Episcopal Church
- Paul Moore (banking manager) (1958–2020), banker and whistleblower from UK bank HBOS
- Paul J. Moore (1868–1938), American politician
- Bud Moore (racing driver) (1941–2017), American NASCAR driver
- Paul Moore (soccer), Canadian soccer player
- Paul Moore (priest) (born 1959), Anglican archdeacon
- Paul Moore (cricketer) (born 1961), Irish cricketer
- Paul Moore (American football) (1918–1975), American football player
- Paul Moore (runner) (born 1916), American middle-distance runner, two-time 800 m All-American for the Stanford Cardinal track and field team

== See also ==
- Paul Moer (1916–2010), American jazz pianist
- Paul Moor (born 1978), English ten-pin bowler
