= Louis T. Moore =

Louis Toomer Moore (1885–1961), was a prominent preservationist, author, historian, photographer, and civic promoter in coastal North Carolina.

== Biography ==
Born in Wilmington, NC, on May 17, 1885, Moore was a son of Roger Moore, an officer in the Confederate States Army during the American Civil War. Louis T. Moore was educated in the Wilmington public schools and at the University of North Carolina at Chapel Hill. While at UNC, Moore served as a corresponding journalist for the Raleigh Evening News, wrote articles for the Daily Tar Heel student paper, and served as Chief Cheerer for UNC athletic events.

After finishing college in 1906, Moore returned to Wilmington and became City Editor of the Wilmington Dispatch. During World War I, a paralyzed foot from a polio inflection disqualified Moore from service in the armed forces. On July 1, 1921, Moore was appointed executive secretary of the Wilmington Chamber of Commerce, a position he held until 1941.

In 1929 and 1930, Moore held weekly broadcasts over KDKA radio in Pittsburgh to promote Wilmington and the North Carolina highway system. He published articles about Wilmington in magazines such as Popular Mechanics, Better Homes and Gardens and Literary Digest. Moore took over 1,000 panoramic pictures during the 1920s and 1930s.

Moore also lobbied for a modern ferry system for the coastal areas, a deeper port for Wilmington, and a protected inland passage on the US East Coast for shipping. Moore was a supporter of the Atlantic Coast Line Railroad, then headquartered in Wilmington.

Moore was a conservationist who pushed efforts to preserve the environment of Southeastern North Carolina. Moore worked to stop the cutting of Wilmington's live oaks by developers and city officials, taking this fight to the North Carolina State Legislature in Raleigh, North Carolina.

From 1941 until his death in 1961, Moore continued to research, promote, and protect the historical integrity and natural beauty of his hometown. Moore published many historical essays and articles, which were frequently quoted and reprinted without him receiving a byline or any other credit. His photos were printed in newspapers, magazines and postcards across the country. Moore published a book entitled Stories Old and New of the Cape Fear Region, in 1956, and authored several brochures during his retirement.

During his last 14 years, Moore headed the Wilmington Historical Commission. In 1960, he received the Charles A. Cannon Cup award from the North Carolina Society for the Preservation of Antiquities.

Louis T. Moore died on November 30, 1961. In 2001, the book Wilmington Through the Lens of Louis T. Moore was published.
