= Ian Moore =

Ian Moore may refer to:

- Ian Moore (cricketer) (1941–2010), English cricketer
- Ian Moore (cyclist) (born 1938), Irish cyclist
- Ian Moore (ice hockey) (born 2002), American ice hockey player
- Ian Moore (musician) (born 1968), American guitarist and singer-songwriter
  - Ian Moore (album), 1993
- Ian Thomas-Moore (born 1976), English footballer, known as Ian Moore
- Ian Moore (author) (born 1970), English author, comedian, TV and radio performer
- Ian Moore (American football) (born 2005), American football player

== See also ==
- Ian Storey-Moore (born 1945), former English footballer
- Ian Moores (1954–1998), English footballer
