= ... More =

English politician

... More, probably Richard More (fl. 1402) was an English politician.

== Life ==
Very little is recorded of More, apart from his surname and the year in which he was an MP. It is thought that More is the Richard More who was mainpernor for the 1406 Plympton MPs.

== Career ==
He was a Member of the Parliament of England in 1402 for Plympton Erle, Devon.
