= Sam Moore (Georgia politician) =

American politician

Member of the Georgia House of Representatives from the 22nd district
- In office February 11, 2014 – January 2015
- Preceded by: Calvin Hill
- Succeeded by: Wes Cantrell

Personal details
- Born: May 12, 1976 (age 50)
- Party: Republican
- Spouse: Galina Dribinski
- Education: Georgia Institute of Technology
- Website: house.ga.gov/...

Sam Moore (born May 12, 1976) is a Republican former member of the Georgia House of Representatives, representing the 22nd House District from February 2014 through January 2015. The district primarily includes parts of Cherokee County and also includes parts of Forsyth County and Fulton county.

== Education and early career ==
Moore grew up in Cherokee County and attended Sequoyah High School. Moore graduated from Georgia Tech in 2000 with a degree in Computer Science. After graduating, he worked in the computer industry in the Atlanta Metropolitan Area. In 2013 he retired from the computer industry.

== Georgia House of Representatives ==
=== Special election 2014 ===
The sitting house district 22 representative, Calvin Hill, died from Leukemia on October 30, 2013 and a special election was called for January 7, 2014. On November 20, 2013, Sam Moore qualified to run for the state house district 22 along with 3 other candidates – Meagan Biello, Jeff Duncan and Nate Cochran. Moore won a plurality of the special election with 38 percent of the 2,433 votes cast. Meagan Biello came in second with 24 percent of the vote. Moore defeated Biello at the runoff with 57.7 percent of the 2,632 votes cast on February 4, 2014 after running a campaign on fighting for liberty and fighting corruption in the Georgia State Government.

=== Tenure ===
Moore was sworn into the Georgia House of Representatives on February 11, 2014. By the time he was sworn in, the Legislative session was half over and "Crossover Day" on March 3, 2014 was rapidly approaching. During his short tenure as part of the 152nd Georgia General Assembly, Sam Moore authored or cosponsored 15 different bills and 3 house resolutions.

==== Controversy ====
On Wednesday, February 19, 2014, Moore introduced House Bill 1033 which repealed Georgia's Loitering Laws. However, by removing the Georgia loitering laws, the bill also removed restrictions on Sex Offenders from loitering near schools and playgrounds.

On Friday February 21, 2014, an article was printed in the Cherokee Tribune discussing HB 1033. In that article Mr. Moore admitted to turning in a bill that made it legal for "registered sex offenders who aren't otherwise barred from going to schools or places children gather (so that sex offenders) could go to those places freely." Representative Moore was quoted in the article as saying, "I am OK with that...Am I saying it's not creepy? It's definitely creepy." Cherokee Sheriff Roger Garrison called the bill "simply insane." and went on to say, "In my 34 years of law enforcement I have never heard of such an insane law having been introduced," Garrison said Friday. "Sexual predators are one of this country's most violent (type of) offenders. If there's any equal it would be an out-and-out serial killer."

On Friday February 21, 2014, the Republican Leadership publicly denounced HB 1033. The speaker of the house, David Ralston stated "The Republican majority in the House chose to stand with Georgia's families and with children. That bill chooses to stand with sex offenders and pedophiles. And that's something that I can't fathom." Moore defended his bill stating: "There's already laws on the books to handle everything that I've heard thus far as far as child molesters or whatever they're worried about attacking children, or whatever; there's already existing laws for that. This is kind of a vague blanket law that applies to everyone, so I didn't see a problem with removing it, and until I hear something specific I still don't have a problem."

On Monday, February 24, 2014, Sam Moore withdrew his bill and publicly apologized for his bill in what the Atlanta Journal And Constitution described as "an extraordinary speech delivered on the House floor." Moore stated "In hindsight, this rookie mistake was silly. I am mature enough to admit that. At the time though, I believed that I was fulfilling a campaign promise to hit the ground running."

According to current Georgia Law, O.C.G.A. 16-11-36, Title 20, Section 20-2-1180: Child Protection Act, 42-1-15, State Sexual Offender Registry, 42-1-14 Sexual Offender Registry. According to 20-2-1180 Loitering upon school premises or within a school safety zone: Parents of children attending Georgia School's are not allowed to be on school property, without first checking into the front office. The law clearly defines, in Section A thru F, that the facilitators of the school are directed to demand that any unauthorized person leave school grounds.
