= Walter Moore =

Walter Moore may refer to:

- Walter Moore (politician) (born 1959), American lawyer, businessman and community activist in Los Angeles, California
- Walter Moore (footballer, born 1899) (1899–1949), English football player for Nelson FC
- Walter Moore (footballer, born 1984), Guyanese international football player
- Dobie Moore (Walter Moore, 1896–1947), American baseball player
- Walter Cecil Moore (1900–1967), English mycologist and plant pathologist
- W. E. C. Moore (Walter Edward Cladek Moore, 1927–1996), American microbiologist
- Walter Scott Moore (1853–1919), president of the Los Angeles, California, Common Council
- Walter Vernon Moore (1927–1976), American politician and state legislator in Mississippi

== See also ==
- Walter P Moore, an engineering company
