= Charles Leonard Moore =

American poet and essayist

Charles Leonard Moore (March 16, 1854 –1925) was an American poet and essayist, born in Philadelphia. He became a lawyer and in 1878–79 served as United States Consul at San Antonio, Brazil. Besides contributing critically to the Chicago Dial, he published:

- Atlas (1881)
- Poems Antique and Modern (1883)
- Book of Day Dreams (1883)
- Banquet of Palacios (1889), a comedy
- Odes (1896)
- The Ghost of Rosalys (1900), a political drama
- The Red Branch Cresta - A Trilogy (1904)
