= Paul Moore (priest) =

Anglican priest

Paul Henry Moore (born 1959) is the first Anglican archdeacon not to be assigned part of a diocese to look after. Instead he is responsible for "mission development" in the Diocese of Winchester.

Moore was educated at Balliol College, Oxford and Wycliffe Hall, Oxford. After a curacy at St Andrew's Church, Oxford, he was vicar of Kildwick and then Cowplain. He was Rural Dean of Havant from 2004 to 2009 and was an honorary canon of Portsmouth Cathedral in 2013. The first "Messy Church" for families was developed and launched by a team in his parish in April 2004.
