= Elizabeth Moore (educator) =

West Virginian educator (1832–1930)

Elizabeth Irwin Moore
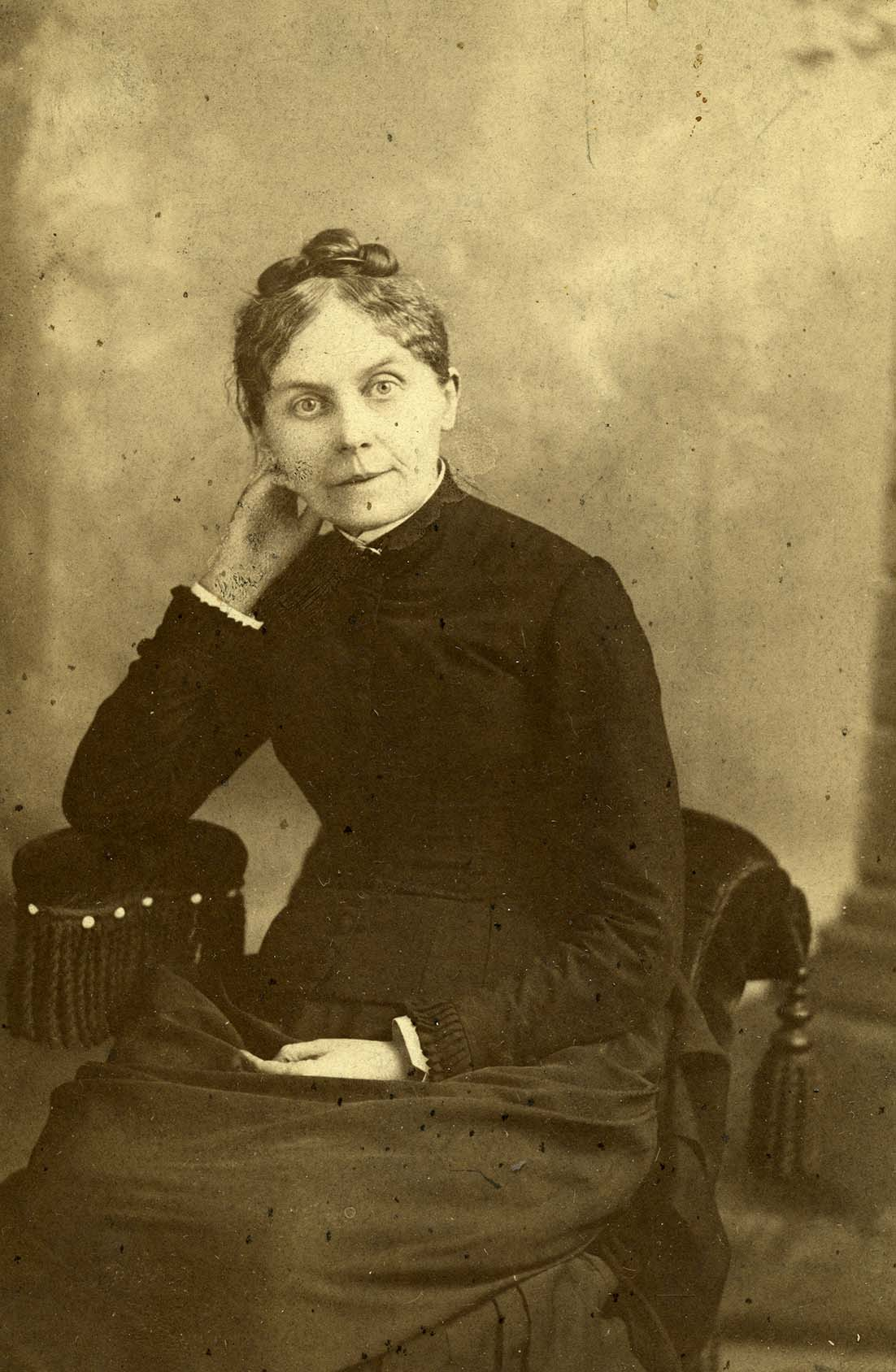
- Moore c. 1875
- Occupation: Seminary principal
- Spouse: James Robertson Moore
- Children: 1

Elizabeth Irwin Moore (1832–1930) was an American educator and principal of the Woodburn Female Seminary in Morgantown, West Virginia from 1865–1866.

== Career ==
=== Civil War ===
In 1863, Moore invited Confederate troops intent on invading Morgantown to obtain horses, in for "bread, butter, and coffee". Her action was credited with saving the Woodburn Female Seminary from being burned.

While working as the principal at Woodburn Female Seminary, Mrs. Elizabeth I Moore was cited to be one of the only female teachers at the school. In the 1870 Morgantown census, Moore was only one of the very few working women mentioned, alongside Prissie Clark, to be working in a field other than housework. This opportunity to work outside the house was rarely granted to women at this time, making Moore's accomplishments extremely revolutionary in 1870's West Virginia.

== Legacy and ghost ==
Jason Burns, educator, journalist and West Virginia storyteller, calls Elizabeth Moore a figurehead symbolizing the women's rights movement in West Virginia.

The construction of Elizabeth Moore Hall marked an increase in "the role of women," ... and the "need for facilities for women students and the new realization of their role" at West Virginia University.

The ghost of Elizabeth I. Moore is repeatedly reported to appear to women in Elizabeth Moore Hall, the building named for her.

== Resources ==
- Doherty, William T. (2013). West Virginia University, symbol of unity in a sectionalized state.
