= Charlotte Moore =

Charlotte Moore may refer to:

- Charlotte Moore (TV executive) (born 1968), British television executive
- Charlotte Moore (actress) (born c. 1958), Canadian actress
- Charlotte Moore Sitterly (1898–1990), American astronomer
- Charlotte Moore (runner) (born 1985), participant in the 2003 World Championships in Athletics
- Charlotte Moore (wheelchair basketball) (born 1998), British wheelchair racer and wheelchair basketball player
- Charlotte Moore (theater director) (born 1939), American actress and theater director
- Charlotte Moore (BoJack Horseman), a character on BoJack Horseman voiced by Olivia Wilde
- Charlotte Moore, a character in The Shrike (film) played by Joy Page
- Charlotte Moore (died 2010), wife of Mal Moore
