= Trevor Moore (disambiguation) =

Trevor Moore (1980–2021) was an American comedian, actor, and writer.

Trevor Moore may also refer to:

- Trevor Moore (sailor) (born c. 1985), American sailor who competed at the 2012 Summer Olympics
- Trevor Moore (ice hockey) (born 1995), American ice hockey player
