= Maurice Moore =

Maurice Moore could refer to:

- Maurice George Moore (1854–1939), Irish author, soldier and politician
- Maurice Moore (Irish republican) (1894–1921)
- Molly Moore (baseball), American baseball player
