= Scott Moore =

Scott Moore may refer to:

- Scott Moore (baseball) (born 1983), American baseball player
- Scott Moore (Nebraska politician) (born 1960), former Nebraska Secretary of State and Union Pacific executive
- Scott Moore (South Dakota politician), member of the South Dakota House of Representatives
- Scott Moore (rugby league) (born 1988), English rugby league footballer
- Scott Moore (filmmaker), American screenwriter and film director
- Scott Moore (sergeant), American Marine who made an online request for actress Mila Kunis to accompany him to the United States Marine Corps Ball
- Scott Moore (television executive), Canadian television executive
- Scott P. Moore, retired Rear Admiral of the U.S. Navy and an Admiral Circle member for SEAL: The Unspoken Sacrifice
- Scotty Moore (1931–2016), guitarist best known for his work with Elvis Presley's early career
- Scott Moore, trans man best known for being one of the first trans men who gave birth; see male pregnancy
