= Ronald Moore =

Ronald Moore or Ron Moore may refer to:

== Sports ==
- Ron Moore (rugby), English rugby union and rugby league footballer of the 1930s
- Ronnie Moore (speedway rider) (1933–2018), New Zealand motorcycle speedway rider
- Ronnie Moore (born 1953), English football player and manager
- Ron Moore (basketball) (born 1962), American basketball player
- Ronald Moore (American football) (born 1970), running back
- Ron Moore (defensive tackle) (born 1977), American football defensive tackle
- Ronald Moore (basketball) (born 1988), American basketball player

== Other ==
- Ron Moore (boat builder), creator of the Moore 24 ULDB in Santa Cruz
- Ronald Moore (Alberta politician) (1925–2010), Lacombe MLA Alberta, Canada
- Ronald Moore (Manitoba politician) (1913–2003), Canadian politician from Manitoba
- Ronald B. Moore, American visual effects producer
- Ronald D. Moore (born 1964), screenwriter and television producer
- Ronald Joseph Moore (1915–1992), New Zealand soldier
- Ronald Lee Moore (1967–2008), American murderer

== See also ==
- Roland Moore, British screenwriter, playwright and author
