= Wendell Moore =

Wendell Moore may refer to:

- Wendell Moore (footballer) (born 1964), Trinidadian footballer
- Wendell Moore Jr. (born 2001), American basketball player
- Wendell F. Moore (1918–1969), American engineer and inventor
