= CFL Cargo Denmark =

Private freight railway company in Denmark

CFL Cargo Danmark
- Formerly: Dansk Jernbane ApS
- Founded: August 2004 in Tønder, Denmark
- Headquarters: Padborg, Denmark
- Website: www.cflcargo.dk

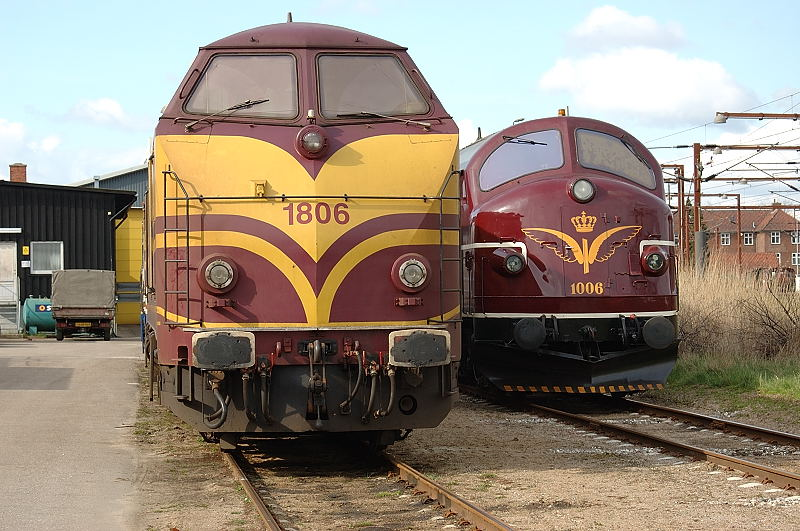
CFL rolling stock

CFL Cargo Danmark (CFLCD) is a private freight railway company in Denmark. It is presently a subsidiary of Luxembourg's CFL Cargo, which is in turn owned by the national railway company of Luxembourg, Société Nationale des Chemins de Fer Luxembourgeois (CFL) and ArcelorMittal.

== History ==
The company was established in August 2004 as Dansk Jernbane ApS (abbreviated DJ and stylized DJ=) as an affiliate to the CFL-owned German company Norddeutsche Eisenbahngesellschaft Niebüll GmbH (neg) by the CFL subsidiary EuroLuxCargo. On 24 January 2005, Rail Net Denmark issued the first operator safety certificate to Dansk Jernbane, permitting the operation of freight services by the company on the Danish railway network west of the Great Belt. This certificate was expanded on 1 August 2005 to allow Dansk Jernbane to operate on any line in Denmark. EuroLuxCargo was restructured into the CFL/Arcelor Profil Luxembourg joint venture CFL Cargo during 2006, consequently, Dansk Jernbane was rebranded as CFL Cargo Danmark in January 2007.

Early on, CFL Cargo Danmark was able to secure a number of customers throughout the country; its fortunes have been contrasted against DB Schenker Rail's service reductions in Denmark on non-transit freight traffic. They have mainly been operating on the two axes, the East Jutland Railway between Padborg in The South and Frederikshavn in The North, and the west–east route between Esbjerg and Nyborg. They have done aluminum transports between Grenå and Tønder for Hydro Aluminium, and have operated east of the Great Belt between Odense and Naestved.

== See also ==
- Rail transport in Denmark
