= Steve Moore =

Steve Moore may refer to:

- Steve Moore (writer) (born 1960), writer and economic policy analyst
- Steve Moore (ice hockey) (born 1978), former National Hockey League player
- Steve Moore (playwright), American playwright
- Steve Moore (cartoonist) (born 1965), American cartoonist, screenwriter, and producer
- Steve Moore (comics) (1949–2014), British comics writer
- Steve Moore (comedian) (1954–2014), American stand-up comedian
- Steve Moore (American football) (1960–1989), American football player
- Steve Moore (footballer) (born 1969), former Chester City footballer
- Steve Moore (racing driver) (1958–2024), American former NASCAR driver
- Steve Moore (musician), keyboardist and bass guitarist of Zombi
- Steve Moore (basketball) (born 1952), college basketball head coach
- Steve Moore (rugby union) (born 1972), Wales rugby union player
- R. Stevie Moore (born 1952), American singer/songwriter and musician
- Detective Sergeant Steve Moore, member of the Train Robbery Squad related to the Great Train Robbery

== See also ==
- Steven Moore (disambiguation)
- Stephen Moore (disambiguation)
