= Nicholas Moore (disambiguation) =

Nicholas Moore (1918–1986) was an English poet.

Nicholas or Nick Mo(o)re may also refer to:

- Nicholas Moore (priest) (1887–1985), New Zealand Catholic priest
- Nicholas R. Moore (1756–1816), U.S. Representative
- pseudonym of Mario Bianchi (1939–2022), Italian film director
- Nick Moore (Canadian football) (born 1986), Canadian football player
- Nick Moore (musician) (born 1983), American musician
- Nick Moore (filmmaker), British film director
- Nicholas More (died 1689), first chief justice of the Province of Pennsylvania
- Nicholas More (MP) (fl. 1390–1397), English politician from Wells, Somerset
- Nick Moore (American football) (born 1992), NFL long snapper
- Nicky Moore (1947–2022), English singer
