= Oliver Moore (disambiguation) =

Oliver Moore (born 2005) is a U.S. hockey player.

Oliver Moore may also refer to:

- Oliver J. Moore, UK sinologist
- Denniston Oliver Moore Jr. (born 1997), U.S. American football player
- Simon Oliver Moore (born 1974), UK cricketer

== See also ==
- Oliver Moors (born 1996), British cyclist
- Olive Moore (1901–1979; Miriam Constance Beaumont Vaughan), British novelist
- Oliver (disambiguation)
- Moore (disambiguation)
