= Ricky Moore =

Ricky Moore may refer to:

- Ricky Moore (American football) (born 1963), American former football running back in the National Football League (NFL)
- Ricky Moore (basketball) (born 1976), American retired basketball player and coach
- Ricky Moore (chef), American chef who owns Saltbox Seafood Joint in Durham, North Carolina

== See also ==
- Rickie D. Moore, theologian
- Richard Moore (disambiguation)
