= Stephen Moore =

Stephen Moore may refer to:

== People ==
=== Writers and actors ===
- Stephen Moore (writer) (born 1960), American economic writer
- Stephen Moore (actor) (1937–2019), English actor, voice of Marvin the Paranoid Android
- Stephen Campbell Moore (born 1979), English actor

=== Politics ===
- Stephen Moore, 1st Viscount Mount Cashell (1696–1766), Anglo-Irish aristocrat and politician
  - Stephen Moore, 1st Earl Mount Cashell (1730–1790), Anglo-Irish aristocrat and politician, his son
  - Stephen Moore, 2nd Earl Mount Cashell (1770–1822), Anglo-Irish aristocrat and politician, his grandson
  - Stephen Moore, 3rd Earl Mount Cashell (1792–1883), Anglo-Irish aristocrat, and politician, his great-grandson
  - Stephen Moore, 4th Earl Mount Cashell (1825–1889)
- Stephen Moore (MP) (1836–1897), Irish politician
- Stephen Moore (Canadian politician), candidate in the 2008 Canadian federal election

=== Sport ===
- Stephen Moore (athlete) (born 1975), American decathlete
- Stephen Moore (cricketer) (born 1980), English cricketer
- Stephen Moore (judoka) (born 1969), American Paralympic judoka
- Stephen Moore (rugby union) (born 1983), Australian rugby footballer

=== Other people ===
- Stephen Moore (fl. 1998), executive at One.Tel
- Stephen Moore, murdered in 2013 by his ex-wife Kathleen Dorsett

== Fictional characters ==
- Stephen Moore, character in 13Hrs

== See also ==
- Steve Moore (disambiguation)
- Steven Moore (disambiguation)
- Stevon Moore (born 1967), former American football player
