= Joseph Moore =

Joseph Moore or Joe Moore may refer to:

== Politics and government ==
- Joseph Moore (peace rider) (1732–1793), mediator between US and the Western Confederacy at Sandusky, Ohio in 1793
- Joseph Lytle Moore (1826–1871), Irish-born lawyer and political figure in New Brunswick
- Joseph B. Moore (Michigan judge) (1845–1930), Michigan Supreme Court justice
- J. Hampton Moore (1864–1950), mayor of Philadelphia and U.S. Representative for Pennsylvania
- Joseph Moore (Newfoundland politician) (1869–1946), Newfoundland politician
- Joe Moore (politician) (born 1958), Chicago alderman

== Entertainment and media ==
- Joe Moore (actor) (1894–1926), Irish-born American actor
- Joe Moore (television journalist), television actor and Hawaii news anchor
- Joseph Patrick Moore (born 1969), American bassist
- Joe Moore (musician) (born 1991), Australian singer-songwriter

== Sports ==
- Joe Moore (speed skater) (1901–1982), American Olympic speed skater
- Jo-Jo Moore (Joseph Gregg Moore, Sr., 1908–2001), American left fielder in Major League Baseball
- Joe Moore (American football coach) (1932–2003), American football coach
- Joe Moore (running back) (born 1949), first-round pick of the NFL Chicago Bears in 1971
- Joseph Moore (cricketer) (1880–?), Barbadian cricketer

== Other ==
- Joseph Haines Moore (1878–1949), American astronomer
- Joseph B. Moore (American educator) (born 1950), American educator and academic administrator
- Joseph Curtis Moore (1914–1995), American zoologist
- Joseph Harold Moore (1914–2006), US Air Force general during the Vietnam War, known for commanding Operation Rolling Thunder
- Joseph Moore (medallist) (1817–1892), English medallist
- Joseph Moore (priest) (1802–1886), Archdeacon of Man
- Joseph Michael John Moore, British World War I flying ace

== See also ==
- Joe-Max Moore (born 1971), former American soccer forward
