= Steven Moore =

Steven Moore may refer to:

- Steven Moore (water skier), British former water skier
- Steven Moore (author) (born 1951), American author and literary critic
- Steven Dean Moore, American animation director
- Steven A. Moore (1945–2023), professor of architecture

== See also ==
- Steve Moore (disambiguation)
- Stephen Moore (disambiguation)
- Stevon Moore (born 1967), former American football player
