= Mandy Moore (disambiguation) =

Mandy Moore (born 1984) is an American singer-songwriter-actress.

- Mandy Moore (album), her self-titled album.

Mandy Moore may also refer to:

- Mandee Moore or Amanda O'Leary (born 1967), American lacrosse coach
- Mandy Moore (choreographer) (born 1976), American choreographer
