= Patrick Moore (disambiguation) =

Sir Patrick Moore (1923–2012) was an English astronomer, co-founder of the Society for Popular Astronomy.

Patrick, Paddy or Pat Moore may also refer to:

== Politicians ==
- Patrick J. Moore (1863–1936), member of the Massachusetts House of Representatives
- Pat Moore (Alabama politician), member of the Alabama House of Representatives, 2006–2010
- Pat Moore (Louisiana politician), member of the Louisiana House of Representatives

== Sportspeople ==
- Patrick Moore (Gaelic footballer) (1867–after 1892), Irish winner of All-Ireland and Munster medals
- Paddy Moore (1909–1951), Irish footballer for Shamrock Rovers and Aberdeen
- Pat Moore (cricketer) (born 1931), New Zealand player in 1961 and 1966 Test matches
- Patrick Moore (golfer) (born 1970), American professional golfer

== Writers ==
- Patrick Eisdell Moore (1918–2015), New Zealand surgeon, medical researcher and author
- Patrick Moore (consultant) (born 1947), Canadian environmental consultant and former president of Greenpeace Canada
- Patrick S. Moore (born 1956), American virologist, epidemiologist and science writer
- Patrick Moore (born 1958), English historian and biographer, pen name Philip Hoare

== Others ==
- Patrick Theodore Moore (1821–1883), Confederate Army brigadier general in the American Civil War

== See also ==
- Patricia Moore (born 1952), American industrial designer, gerontologist and author
- Mary-Pat Moore (born 1961), Irish cricketer
- Patsy Moore (born 1964), Antigua-born American singer/songwriter, poet, essayist and educator
