= David Cresap Moore =

American historian

David Cresap Moore (1925 – December 27, 2001) was an American historian of nineteenth century British political history.

== Early life and education ==
He was born in Leavenworth, Kansas, the son of an army colonel. He was educated at Shady Hill School, Choate Rosemary Hall and Institut Le Rosey, before enrolling in Princeton University in 1943. During World War II and in 1946, he served in the United States Navy in the South Pacific. Afterwards, he attended Columbia University and achieved a BS in history in 1950. After a two-year period of study at Cambridge University as a member of the Fulbright Program, in 1958 Moore was awarded a PhD.

== Academic career ==
His early academic career was spent at Rutgers University, Wesleyan University, Binghamton University and Yale University. From 1961 until his retirement in 1981, he worked for the University of California, Los Angeles. He was then an associate at the Center for European Studies at Harvard University.

His 1961 article in Victorian Studies, "The Other Face of Reform", was an important revisionist work that reinterpreted the Reform Act 1832. Moore was the first historian to analyse pollbooks and he used this research to expound his thesis that voters in rural constituencies were generally deferential to local landed families. Moore also argued that aspects of the Reform Act, such as the borough freeholder clause and the redrawing of electoral boundaries, were viewed as a solution to the apparent decline of the landed interest rather than as concessions to the middle class.

In his 1976 work, The Politics of Deference, Moore elaborated these ideas to include an analysis of the Reform Act 1867. In 1994, he published a second edition, where he responded to critics who were sceptical about his claims for a deferential electorate. The historian Anthony Brundage has said: "Whatever one's views of the merits of his thesis, it cannot be doubted that he had launched an extraordinarily fruitful debate and permanently transformed scholarly thinking about the 19th-century British political system."

== Personal life ==
He was married to Sally Falk Moore, an anthropologist, and they had two daughters.

== Works ==
- 'The Other Face of Reform', Victorian Studies, Vol. 5, No. 1 (Sep., 1961), pp. 7–34.
- 'The Corn Laws and High Farming', The Economic History Review, New Series, Vol. 18, No. 3 (1965), pp. 544–561.
- 'Concession or Cure: The Sociological Premises of the First Reform Act', The Historical Journal, Vol. 9, No. 1 (1966), pp. 39–59.
- 'Social Structure, Politics Structure, and Public Opinion in Mid-Victorian England', in Robert Robson (ed.), Ideas and Institutions of Victorian England: Essays in Honour of George Kitson Clark (London: HarperCollins, 1967).
- 'Political Morality in Mid-Nineteenth Century England: Concepts, Norms, Violations', Victorian Studies, Vol. 13, No. 1 (Sep., 1969), pp. 5–36.
- (with E. P. Hennock), 'The Sociological Premises of the First Reform Act: A Critical Note', Victorian Studies, Vol. 14, No. 3 (Mar., 1971), pp. 321–337.
- 'The Matter of the Missing Contests: Towards a Theory of the Mid-19th Century British Political System', Albion: A Quarterly Journal Concerned with British Studies, Vol. 6, No. 2 (Summer, 1974), pp. 93–119.
- The Politics of Deference: A Study of the Mid-Nineteenth Century English Political System (Hassocks: Harvester Press, 1976).
- 'Is "The Other Face of Reform" in Bucks an "Hallucination"?', Journal of British Studies, Vol. 15, No. 2 (Spring, 1976), pp. 150–158.
- 'Some Thoughts on Thoroughness and Carefulness Suggested by Comparing the Reports of the Aylesbury Meeting of 24 February 1830 in the Times and the Bucks Gazette', Journal of British Studies, Vol. 17, No. 1 (Autumn, 1977), pp. 141–142.
