= D. J. Johnson =

D. J. Johnson may refer to:

- D. J. Johnson (basketball) (born 1993), American basketball player
- D. J. Johnson (cornerback, born 1966), American football player
- D. J. Johnson (cornerback, born 1985), American football player
- D. J. Johnson (defensive end) (born 1998), American football player
- Darrien Johnson (born 1980), American football player
- DJ Johnson (baseball) (born 1989), American baseball player
- DJ Johnson (politician) (born 1957), American politician from Kentucky
- Donald "DJ" Johnson (born 1976), American drummer for Khruangbin
