= Donald Willard Moore =

Canadian civil rights activist

- Born: Donald Willard Moore; November 2, 1891; Saint Michael Parish, Barbados
- Died: August 22, 1994 (aged 102); Toronto, Ontario, Canada
- Education: Dalhousie University, Faculty of Dentistry (left before completion)
- Years active: 1920s–1975
- Known for: Civil Rights and Immigration Activism
- Spouse: Kay Moore
- Children: 4

Donald Willard Moore (1891–1994), known also as "Uncle Don", was a Black Canadian civil rights activist who fought to change Canada’s immigration laws. He is known for his involvement in several civil rights organizations and for leading a delegation in Ottawa that successfully managed to push the Government of Canada to revise discriminatory immigration laws affecting non-white immigrants.

== Early life and education ==
Donald Willard Moore was born in Saint Michael, Barbados on November 2, 1891, to Charles Alexander Moore, a cabinetmaker and member of the Barbados Harbour Police Force, and Ruth Elizabeth Moore. Moore had learned the skills of a tailor in Barbados and had begun to ply his trade. In 1913, when he was 21, Moore emigrated to New York City, and then moved again to Montreal shortly afterwards. Moore attempted to find work as a tailor but could not work in that field due to racism. He worked as a pullman porter, one of the few occupations available to Black men in Canada at the time.

Moore's work brought him to Toronto by the spring of 1913. He enrolled at the Dominion Business College at 357 College Street. During his time at the college, Moore completed courses necessary to enroll in the dentistry program at Dalhousie University in Halifax, Nova Scotia. After saving enough money, Moore entered the dentistry program at Dalhousie in 1918. However, Moore caught tuberculosis during his dentistry education and had to leave his studies, abruptly ending his plans to become a dentist. Moore spent 18 months in a hospital recovering from tuberculosis. Moore returned to Toronto shortly after his recovery.

in 1920, Moore started working as a tailor at Occidental Cleaners and Dyers, eventually buying the business after saving enough money. Moore became heavily involved in the local Black and West Indian communities. He served as the secretary of the Black Community Church of Canada, and opened up the church gym to Black youth for activities such as rollerblading and boxing that were otherwise inaccessible for them due to racism. Moore's business became important to the local West Indian community, becoming the founding place for the Toronto chapter of the Universal Negro Improvement Association and African Communities League. Moore would continue to administrate his business until retirement in 1975.

== Activism ==
=== Early activism ===
Moore was a prominent community leader and civil rights activist in the West Indian-Canadian and Black Canadian communities. In the 1920s, Moore met and was influenced by Marcus Garvey, the founder of the Universal Negro Improvement Association (UNIA). Moore subsequently became a founding member of the Toronto chapter of the UNIA. Additionally, Moore's dry-cleaning business became a gathering spot for the UNIA. In 1944, Moore became a founding member of the first Black credit union. Moore was also a key player in the formation of the West Indian Progressive Association, which later became the West Indian Trading Association.

In 1950, Moore met Bromley Armstrong the two began talking. In 1951, Moore and Armstrong, among others, founded the Negro Citizenship Association (NCA) in response to the Government of Canada's increasingly strict immigration measures against Black people. Moore became the association's first director, with his dry-cleaning and tailoring business becoming the NCA's first headquarters . The NCA challenged exclusionary immigration laws that denied the legal entry of Black West Indians into Canada.

=== Ottawa delegation ===
On April 27, 1954, Moore led a delegation to Ottawa, consisting of representatives from the NCA, unions, labor councils, and community organizations to protest these exclusionary and discriminatory immigration policies. Specifically, the delegation was concerned with how the Canadian Immigration Act maintained a race-based hierarchy of "British subjects" within the commonwealth who wished to immigrate to Canada. White immigrants within the commonwealth were favored while Black immigrants would be denied because, according to the act, they “could not adjust to Canada’s rigid climate or assimilate well into the society". The delegation also presented a brief outlining their concerns with immigration policy to Minister of Immigration and Citizenship, Walter Edward Harris. The brief gained widespread attention by drawing the public eye to Canada's discriminatory immigration laws, describing the harmful impact of these laws on non-white immigrants, while also recommending changes. One excerpt from the brief reads:

"The Immigration Act since 1923 seems to have been purposely written and revised to deny equal immigration status to those areas of the Commonwealth where coloured peoples constitute a large part of the population. This is done by creating a rigid definition of British Subject: ‘British subjects by birth or by naturalization in the United Kingdom, Australia, New Zealand or the Union of South Africa and citizens of Ireland.’ This definition excludes from the category of ‘British subject’ those who are in all other senses British subjects, but who come from such areas as the British West Indies, Bermuda, British Guiana, Ceylon, India, Pakistan, Africa, etc…Our delegation claims this definition of British subject is discriminatory and dangerous."

During the meeting with Harris, Moore was asked "Are you including the Chinese, the East Indians, and people from other parts of the world in your demand?" to which Moore replied "Yes". The next eight years did not bring much change, however the NCA continued its grassroots campaign by rallying support in parliament. Immigration policies were finally relaxed in 1962 by the federal government of John Diefenbaker. Afterwards, Moore assisted in arranging partnerships with the governments of Barbados and Jamaica to employ young women from those countries as nurses and domestic workers in Canada. These women would work for a year in Canada before being granted permanent residency.

=== Later activism ===
In 1956, Moore established a community center for local West Indians called Donavalon Centre. In addition to hosting a range of activities, the center was also home to the Negro Citizenship Association and the United Negro Improvement Association. The Donavalon center served as a meeting place for members of the community and hosted activities such as dances and tea. Moore was later known for negotiating with Ontario Premiers George A. Drew and Leslie Frost, and federal cabinet minister Jack Pickersgill to improve the rights and access of Black Canadians to housing and employment.

== Later life and death ==
Moore was married to Kay Moore for nearly 30 years. After his retirement in 1975, Moore became involved in gardening and photography. He was a member of the North York Horticultural Society and received an award for his service in 1984. Though Moore retired in 1975, he remained involved in Black-Canadian causes such as through the Donald Willard Moore scholarship, which was established for students at George Brown College. Moore's dry-cleaning business continued to support fundraising efforts as well.

Moore died in his sleep on August 22, 1994, at the age of 102. He is buried at Sanctuary Park Cemetery in Etobicoke.

== Awards and legacy ==
Moore received many awards for his activism and involvement in the Black Canadian community, including the City of Toronto Award of Merit (1982), the Ontario Bicentennial Medal (1984), the Harry Jerome Award of Merit (1984), the Barbados Service Medal (1986), the Ontario Medal for Good Citizenship (1987) and the Order of Ontario(1988). Most notably, Moore was awarded the Order of Canada on October 23, 1989, and invested on April 19, 1990. In 2000, Moore was honored by city of Toronto with a commemorative plaque in front of 20 Cecil Street, the former gathering location for the Negro Citizenship Association.

Donald Moore Community Services Inc., a Barbadian-Canadian organization that helps immigrants adapt to Canadian life was re-named from Barbados House Canada Inc. in honor of Moore's activism and work in the Canadian Caribbean community. Moore had been a supporter of Barbados House since its inception. Starting in 2013, Donald Moore Community Services Inc. started a new initiative called the "annual Donald Moore Appreciation Brunch" in which members would select to honor a person of Caribbean heritage who was deemed as upholding the principles of Donald Willard Moore.

Moore's friend and fellow civil rights leader Bromley Armstrong described Moore as “the leader, the gentle giant, the man with the iron fist in a velvet glove”.
