= Claire Moore =

Claire Moore may refer to:

- Claire Moore (politician) (born 1956), Australian politician
- Claire Moore (singer) (born 1960), English soprano singer and actress
- Claire Moore (cricketer) (born 2003), Australian cricketer
- Claire Mahl Moore, American artist

== See also ==
- Clare Moore, Australian musician and songwriter
