= Al Moore =

Al Moore may refer to:

- A. L. Moore (1849–1939) British glass-maker
- A. Al Moore (1915–1991), American football player
- Albert Moore (disambiguation), several persons
