= Lisa Schulte Moore =

American landscape ecologist

Lisa Schulte Moore is an American landscape ecologist. Schulte Moore is a professor of natural resource ecology and management at Iowa State University. In 2020 she received a US$10 million grant to study anerobic digestion and its application to turning manure into usable energy. In 2021, she was named a MacArthur Fellow.

== Early life and education ==
Schulte Moore grew up in Eau-Claire, WI and comes from a farming family, with both of her maternal grandparents growing up on dairy farms. Her family maintained a farm in the Eau-Claire area until the 1980s, when they lost the farm during the 1980s farm crisis. After graduating from Eau Claire North High School, Schulte Moore earned a bachelor's degree in biology at the University of Wisconsin-Eau Claire. She earned a master's degree in biology at the University of Minnesota Duluth, and a doctorate in forestry at the University of Wisconsin-Madison.

== Work ==
Schulte Moore has worked with farmers to develop resilient and sustainable agricultural practices and systems that take into consideration climate change, water quality and loss of biodiversity.

Schulte Moore has written on various ecological topics, including the ecological effects of fire on landscapes; soil carbon storage, biodiversity improvement, the effects of wind and fire on forests, among others.

Schulte Moore currently serves as the director of the Consortium for Cultivating Human And Naturally reGenerative Enterprises (C-CHANGE) at Iowa State University. She also serves as co-director of the university's Bioeconomy Institute. She also works in large transdisciplinary teams, consisting of a variety of scientists, engineers, farmers, farmland owners, and representatives of government, industry, and NGOs in order to foster continuous living cover on agricultural landscapes. Schulte Moore has also been recognized as a Charles F. Curtiss distinguished professor in agricultural and life sciences by Iowa State University

== Awards and honors ==
- John D. and Katherine T. MacArthur Foundation Fellowship (2021)
- Citation for Leadership and Achievement, Council for Scientific Society Presidents (2022)
- AAAS Fellow in the section on Agriculture, Food & Renewable Resources (2024)
- Top Agri-food Pioneer, World Food Prize Foundation (2024)
