= Dave Moore (motorsport commentator) =

British sports broadcaster

Dave Moore (born 14 April 1966, Douglas, Isle of Man) is a television motorsport commentator and script writer. He has commentated on many motorsport events including the North West 200 and the Ulster Grand Prix for BBC television. He is one of the commentators on the British Rally Championship which is broadcast on Sky Sports. He was the on-screen presenter and is commentator for the British Motocross Championship which is broadcast on Sky Sports. He is also race commentator of the P1 Powerboat Championship which is broadcast on Sky Sports.

He has also presented and co-presented a number of motorsport television programmes including the British Rally Championship, the Isle of Man TT Races, the British Rallycross Championship, the Moto 1 series, World's Fastest Bikes 2, MCN and the Dunlop Race Academy.

He also wrote, produced and narrated the films 'Hizzy: Champion of Road and Track' about the career of motorcycle racer Steve Hislop and 'The David Jefferies Story' about motorcycle racer David Jefferies.

Moore has written a number of articles, including cover stories, for various UK magazines including Motorcycle Racer, Motorcycle Sport & Leisure and Island Racer. He has also reported on a freelance basis for Autosport and Motorsport News.

He produced Greenlight Television's documentary 'Breaking the Barrier' which charted the TT career of John McGuinness from his first visit to the Isle of Man to the record breaking 130 mph lap he achieved in 2007. It was broadcast on ITV4 and a longer version was released on DVD.

In 2011, Dave produced, wrote and narrated Greenlight Television's '1000 Bikes Festival:Return of the Kings' which was broadcast on ITV4 in the United Kingdom and featured motorcycle racers Kenny Roberts, Giacomo Agostini, Graeme Crosby, Alex George, Mick Grant and Steve Parrish.

In 2012, Dave produced, wrote and narrated Greenlight Television's documentary about World Superbikes in the 1990s called 'Superbikes When Britain Ruled The World' which was broadcast on ITV4 in the United Kingdom and featured motorcycle racers Carl Fogarty, James Whitham, Neil Hodgson Pierfrancesco Chili and TV commentators Keith Huewen and Julian Ryder.

In 2004, Dave's nephew Nathan Moore was born, who went on to headline in the Liverpool Echo 16th of January issue.
