= Louis Moore (historian) =

American historian

- Education: California State University, Sacramento; University of California, Davis
- Scientific career
- Fields: History
- Workplaces: Michigan State University

Louis Moore is an American historian. He is a professor of history at Michigan State University. He studies African American History, Civil Rights, and the history of sport, particularly the connections between race and sports in American history. Together with the historian Derrick White, Moore hosts The Black Athlete podcast.

== Career ==
Moore attended California State University, Sacramento, where he graduated with a BA degree in 2001. He then studied history as a graduate student at The University of California, Davis, obtaining an MA in 2005 and a PhD in 2008.

In 2017, Moore published the book I fight for a living: Boxing and the Battle for Black Manhood, 1880–1915. The book is a study of the careers of African American prizefighters around the turn of the 20th century. In I fight for a living, Moore analyzes the community of African American boxers as a community of workers, viewing boxing as a path to potential financial success that challenged the system of Jim Crow. In situating boxing as a type of labor, Moore uses evidence from African American press outlets to study the social and economic context of boxing, and investigates a tension between the rare chance for financial success that boxing offered to Black men and its reputation as a violent and socially marginal enterprise. He also investigates the racism of the sport, including the color line and the use of Social Darwinist theories, and how that racism was challenged by successful African American boxers like Peter Jackson and Jack Johnson towards the end of the 20th century. He also documents the exploitation of African American boxers by the era's almost exclusively white boxing managers.

Also in 2017, Moore published We Will Win the Day: the Civil Rights Movement, the Black Athlete, and the Quest for Equality. In We Will Win the Day, Moore examines the political history of African American athletes and their white allies after World War II, and their relationship to the broader Civil rights movement. He argues that, through efforts to eliminate racial segregation in sports like bowling and baseball and eliminate formal racial barriers in sports like American football and golf, African American athletes and media drove social change outside of sports. Moore places in this context the stories of famous athletes like Jackie Robinson, Muhammad Ali, and Tommie Smith, while also discussing figures in sports that typically receive less attention like the tennis player Althea Gibson, the golfer Bill Spiller, and the bowler Maurice Kilgore, and he argues that the role of white managers who helped to advance the careers of some African American athletes has been overstated.

Moore also narrated and released an audiobook with The Great Courses called African-American Athletes Who Made History. The book was a best-seller on Audible in 2020.

Moore frequently discusses the relationship between race and sports in American popular media. He contributed regularly over several years to the sports news and commentary website The Shadow League. Moore and the historian Derrick White host The Black Athlete podcast, which launched in early 2019. They discuss the history that informs contemporary issues and controversies in American sports. For example, when a noose was found in the Talladega Superspeedway stall of NASCAR driver Bubba Wallace, they discussed the history of lynchings in America and their reflection in sports culture.

Moore's work has been discussed, cited, or reviewed in news outlets including Michigan Radio, The Nation, NPR, and Public Books.

== Selected works ==
- I fight for a living: Boxing and the Battle for Black Manhood, 1880–1915 (2017)
- We Will Win the Day: the Civil Rights Movement, the Black Athlete, and the Quest for Equality (2017)
- African-American Athletes Who Made History
