= Charlie Moore =

Charley or Charlie Moore may refer to:

- Charley Moore (1884–1970), American baseball player
- Charlie Moore (baseball) (1953–2026), American baseball player
- Charlie Moore (footballer, born 1898) (1898–1966), English footballer for Manchester United
- Charlie Moore (footballer, born 1905) (1905–1972), English footballer for Bradford City
- Charlie Moore (Australian rules footballer) (1875–1901), Australian rules footballer for Essendon
- Charlie Moore (television personality) (born 1970), American television sports personality
- Charlie Moore (basketball) (born 1998), American basketball player
- Charlie Moore (Canadian football) (born 1998), Canadian football linebacker
- Charlie Moore, character in 13Hrs
- Charlie Moore, character in Head of the Class

== See also ==
- Charles Moore (disambiguation)
