= USS Samuel N. Moore =

Allen M. Sumner-class destroyer

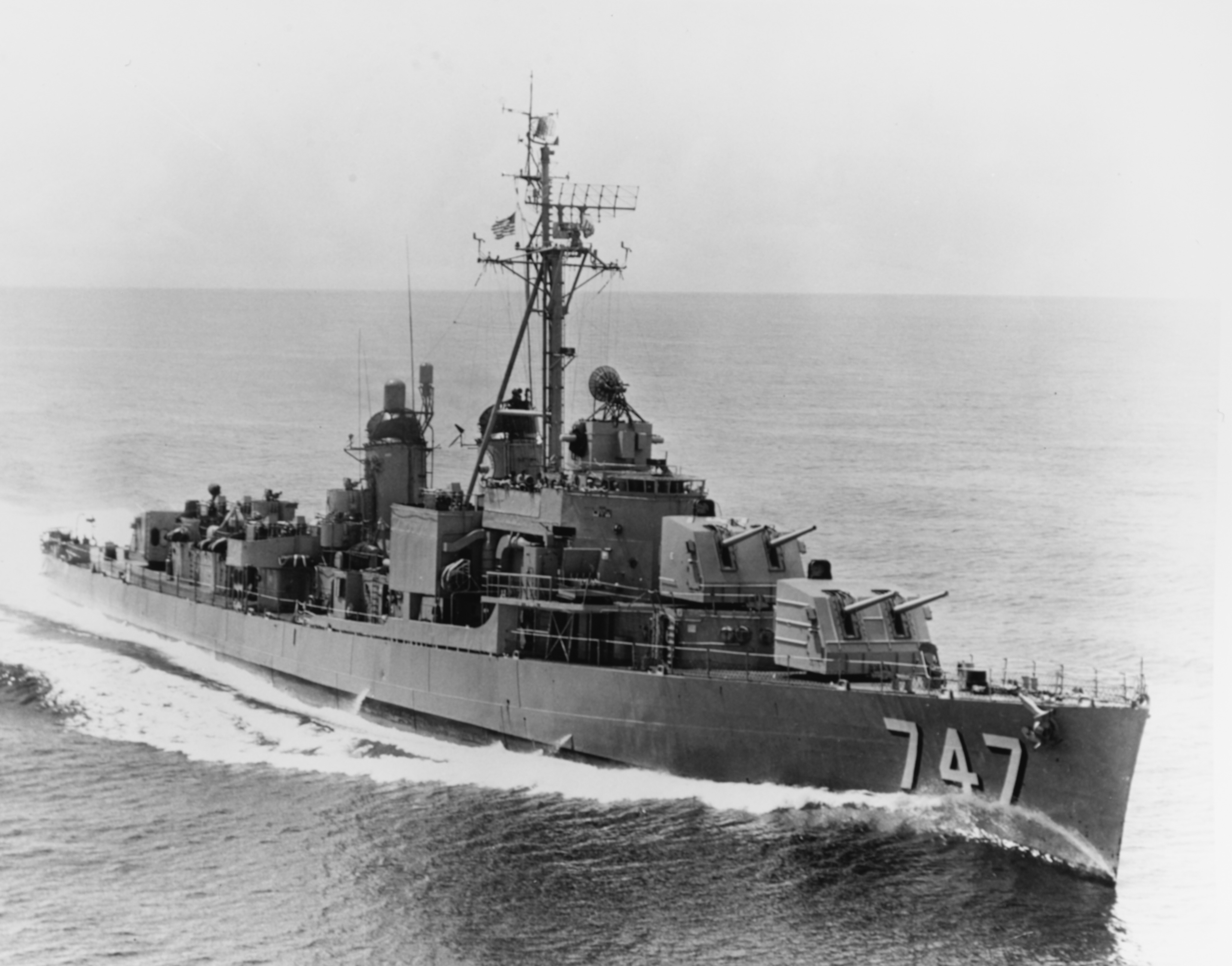
- USS Samuel N. Moore underway in 1950s

History

United States
- Name: Samuel N. Moore
- Namesake: Samuel Nobre Moore
- Builder: Bethlehem Mariners Harbor
- Laid down: 30 September 1943
- Launched: 23 February 1944
- Sponsored by: Mrs. Samuel N. Moore
- Commissioned: 24 June 1944
- Decommissioned: 24 October 1969
- Stricken: 24 October 1969
- Identification: Callsign: NHWZ; Hull number: DD-747
- Fate: Transferred to the Republic of China, 10 December 1969
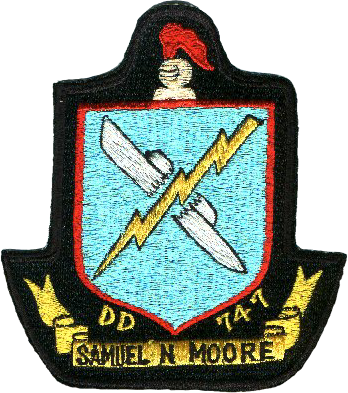
- Badge

Taiwan
- Name: Heng Yang; (衡陽)
- Namesake: Heng Yang
- Acquired: 10 December 1969
- Commissioned: 25 April 1970
- Identification: Hull number: DD-2
- Reclassified: DD-902; DDG-902
- Decommissioned: 1 December 1994
- Stricken: May 1995
- Fate: Sunk as target

General characteristics
- Class & type: Allen M. Sumner-class destroyer
- Displacement: 2,200 tons
- Length: 376 ft 6 in (114.76 m)
- Beam: 40 ft (12 m)
- Draft: 15 ft 8 in (4.78 m)
- Propulsion: 60,000 shp (45,000 kW); 2 propellers
- Speed: 34 knots (63 km/h; 39 mph)
- Range: 6,500 nmi (12,000 km; 7,500 mi) at 15 kn (28 km/h; 17 mph)
- Complement: 336
- Armament: 6 × 5 in (130 mm) guns, 12 × 40 mm AA guns, 11 × 20 mm AA guns, 10 × 21 inch (533 mm) torpedo tubes, 6 × depth charge projectors, 2 × depth charge tracks

USS Samuel N. Moore (DD-747), an Allen M. Sumner-class destroyer, is the only ship of the United States Navy to be named for Samuel N. Moore.

== Namesake ==
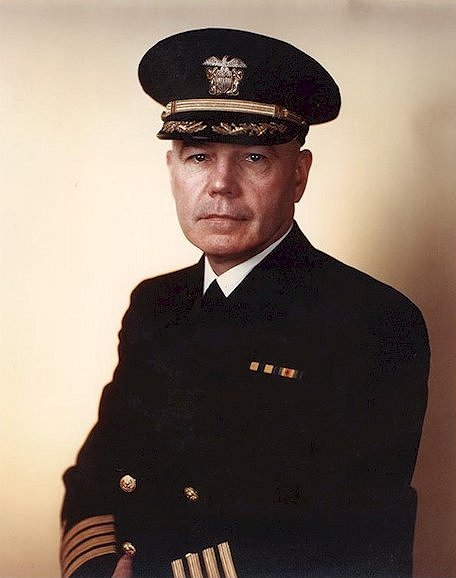
Samuel N. Moore in 1941

Samuel Nobre Moore was born on 7 September 1891 in Washington, D.C. He entered the United States Naval Academy in 1909 and was commissioned Ensign in 1913. From April 1914 to February 1915, he served on board USS Hopkins (DD-6) and participated in the occupation of Veracruz. He served on USS Nicholson (DD-52) from May 1915 to January 1917 and on USS Michigan (BB-27) while the United States participated in World War I.

During the interwar period, he held numerous naval posts ashore and at sea with the Atlantic, Pacific, and Asiatic Fleets. In command of Destroyer Division 21 from September 1937 into 1939, Moore organized the New England section of the Neutrality Patrol in late 1939. He took command of USS Quincy (CA-39) on 20 May 1942 and died on the night of 8–9 August 1942 when that cruiser was sunk while fighting in the Battle of Savo Island.

== Construction and commissioning ==
Samuel N. Moore (DD-747) was laid down on 30 September 1943 by Bethlehem Mariners Harbor Shipbuilding Yard, Staten Island, New York and launched on 23 February 1944; sponsored by Mrs. Samuel N. Moore. The ship was commissioned on 24 June 1944.

=== Service in the United States Navy ===
==== World War II ====
Following shakedown off Bermuda, the new destroyer steamed, via the Panama Canal and Pearl Harbor, to the Pacific war zone, arriving at Ulithi on 3 November 1944. There she joined the Fast Carrier Task Force and defended Vice Admiral Marc Mitscher's aircraft carriers from enemy aircraft and submarines. The carriers that she guarded launched numerous air strikes against Japanese positions in the Philippines, the Ryukyus, Formosa, the Pescadores, Indochina, China, and the Japanese home islands. She was damaged by a typhoon on 5 June 1945. In an attack on the night of 22 and 23 July, she launched torpedoes at enemy shipping off the east entrance to Sagami Wan, Japan. She rescued one aviator on 10 June and two more on 18 July.

After Japan capitulated, Samuel N. Moore aided occupation forces, visiting Shanghai and Tsingtao, China, and Pusan, Korea. From 1947 into 1950, she operated off the west coast. Departing San Diego on 1 May 1950, she steamed to the western Pacific.

==== Korean War ====
In response to North Korea invading South Korea, she headed north from Hong Kong on 27 June. During the summer and fall, she served off Korea, before returning to San Diego on 11 February 1951. Sailing again for the Far East on 1 December, she guarded carriers and bombarded enemy shore installations in Korea from February to May 1952 before returning to San Diego on 26 June. Steaming from Long Beach on 2 February 1953, she returned to Korea. Defending the fast carriers again, she visited Koje Island in March. In April, she aided the defense of Yang-do Island and patrolled near Chongjin; in May, she fought enemy shore batteries at Wonsan Harbor. In June, she patrolled the Taiwan Strait; and, in July, she provided shore bombardment off Korea. After the end of fighting in Korea, she returned to Long Beach, California on 30 August.

Departing Long Beach on 4 May 1954, she cruised with antisubmarine forces in the western Pacific; patrolled Taiwan Strait, and visited the Tachen Islands on 19 August, before returning to Long Beach on 5 December.

From 1955 through 1959, she made annual deployments to the western Pacific, visiting the Philippines, Taiwan, and Japan. In 1960 and 1961, she served with a specialized antisubmarine task force in the western Pacific, before conducting operations off the West Coast in 1962 and 1963.

==== Vietnam War ====
From 13 March to 2 October 1964, Samuel N. Moore was away from Long Beach on another deployment to the western Pacific. In August, during the crisis following the Gulf of Tonkin incident, Samuel N. Moore supplied ammunition to the destroyer Maddox, and transferred documents from Maddox and Turner Joy to Ticonderoga.

Sailing from the West Coast for the western Pacific on 28 September 1965, she provided gunfire support off Vietnam, operated as a plane guard in the South China Sea, and fired on targets in the Mekong Delta, before returning to Long Beach on 8 April. Getting underway again for the western Pacific on 28 March 1967, she patrolled off North Vietnam, as part of Operation Sea Dragon, and protected aircraft carriers in the Tonkin Gulf, before arriving at Long Beach on 20 September. Underway from Long Beach to the western Pacific on 18 July 1968, she again conducted several shore bombardments and guarded carriers in the Tonkin Gulf before returning to Long Beach on 26 February 1969.

In April, she became a Naval Reserve training ship at Tacoma, Washington. Decommissioned on 24 October, she was struck from the Navy list that day. Samuel N. Moore received five battle stars for World War II, three battle stars for Korea, and seven battle stars for Vietnam.

=== Service in the Republic of China Navy ===
She was sold in December 1969 to the Republic of China. (Note: DANFS states that she was sold on 10 December 1969, while Jane's Fighting Ships 1971–72 gives a date of sale of 9 December 1969, with formal transfer occurring on 11 December 1969.) The ship served in the Republic of China Navy as Heng Yang (DD-2). By 1986 Heng Yang, by now carrying the pennant number D-976, underwent the Ching Chuang modification, with the ship's aft 5-inch mount and 3-inch anti-aircraft guns were removed, allowing six Hsiung Feng I anti-ship missiles in two triple mounts and two twin 40-mm anti-aircraft mounts to be added. She later had a quadruple Sea Chaparral surface-to-air missile launcher added, and changed pennant number to D902. She was stricken in May 1995 and later sunk as target.
