= Davey Moore =

Davey Moore may refer to:

- Davey Moore (boxer, born 1933) (1933–1963), American featherweight boxer, fatally injured in a bout
- Davey Moore (boxer, born 1959) (1959–1988), American middleweight boxer, accidentally crushed by his own car
- Davey Moore (racing driver) (born 1946), Canadian dirt modified racing driver
- Davey Moore (fl. 2000s), British writer associated with Doctor Who New Series Adventures

== See also ==
- David Moore (disambiguation)
