= Charles Harold Moore =

English one-legged swimmer

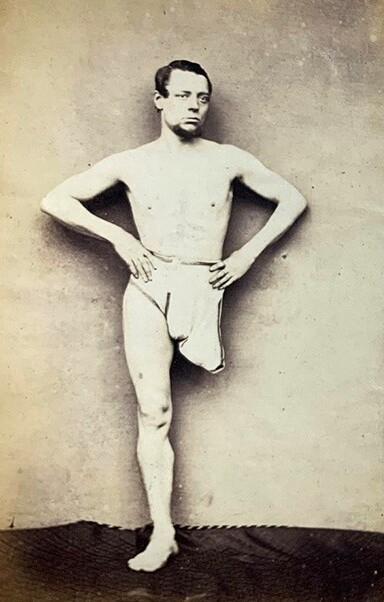
- Moore c. 1865

Personal information
- Born: 1832 Gravesend, Great Britain

Sport
- Sport: Swimming

Charles Harold Moore (born c. 1832) was a champion English one-legged swimmer.

== Early life ==
Moore was born to Charles and Ann Moore around 1832. He lost his leg when he was 11 years old and had several siblings.

== Career ==
Moore competed in races during the 1860s and 70s, notably beating the current South Coast champion Fred Cavill in 1873. He was considered "one of the best professional swimminers in London" in 1864. He worked as a swimming teacher at the Endell Street and Wenlock Baths in London, encouraging people to participate in competitive swimming.

He was also a highly-ranked artistic or ornamental swimmer during the Victorian period, being written up for his performances in the local newspapers. Photographs of Moore are held by the UK National Archives, registered for copyright in 1865. The Archives note "Individuals registering images for copyright tended to do so for commercial reasons," and theorized that these photos were possibly created to be sold outside public swimming areas. His official job was listed as "professor of swimming" in census records and he was said to have taught at the London Swimming Club.

== Later life ==
Moore married Ellen O’Brien in 1867 and the couple had at least two children. He suffered from an unknown "long and painful illness" and was occasionally unable to work and he and his family wound up in the workhouse. In 1881 an article in the magazine Sporting Life was written in order to raise money for him to get out of the workhouse. The article indicated he had "held the position of champion of one-legged swimmer for a period of 23 years."

By 1901 he was reported to be selling matches from Waterloo Bridge and was involved in court proceedings over a purported inheritance from a distant brother.
