= Nathaniel Moore Banta House =

Historic house in Illinois, United States

- U.S. National Register of Historic Places
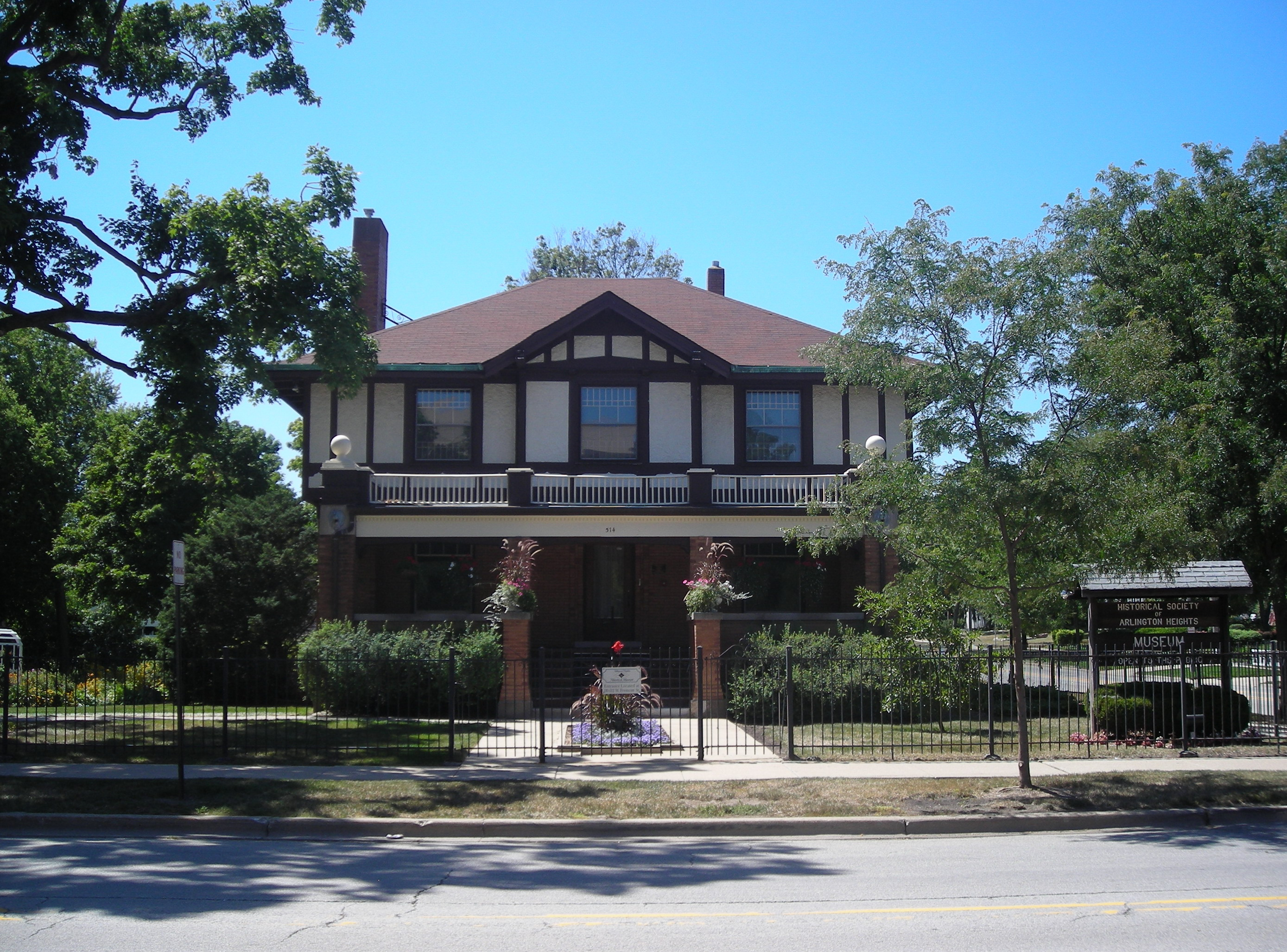

- Location within Illinois Location within the United States
- Location: 514 N. Vail Ave., Arlington Heights, Illinois
- Coordinates: 42°5′15.06″N 87°59′2.79″W
- Area: less than one acre
- Built: 1908
- Architect: W.W. Abell & Son
- Architectural style: Arts and Crafts
- NRHP reference No.: 98000465
- Added to NRHP: May 20, 1998

The Nathaniel Moore Banta House is an Arts and Crafts residence adjacent to the Muller House on the grounds of the Arlington Heights Historical Museum, United States. It has been on the National Register of Historic Places since May 20, 1998.
