= Christine Moore =

Christine Moore may refer to:

- Christine Moore (director), American television director
- Christine Moore (politician) (born 1983), Canadian politician
- Christine Moore, former co-owner of the now-defunct Moore's Delicatessen
- Christine Palamidessi Moore, Italian-American writer and novelist

== See also ==
- Chris More (Christine More), Canadian curler
- Christina Moore, American actress
