= Richard Moore (Roman Catholic priest) =

Richard Moore was a 15th-century Archdeacon of Armagh, Ireland. he was appointed by Papal provision in 1402 and was pardoned by the Crown on 28 July 28 that year.
