= Gerald Moore (journalist) =

American-born writer and editor (born 1938)

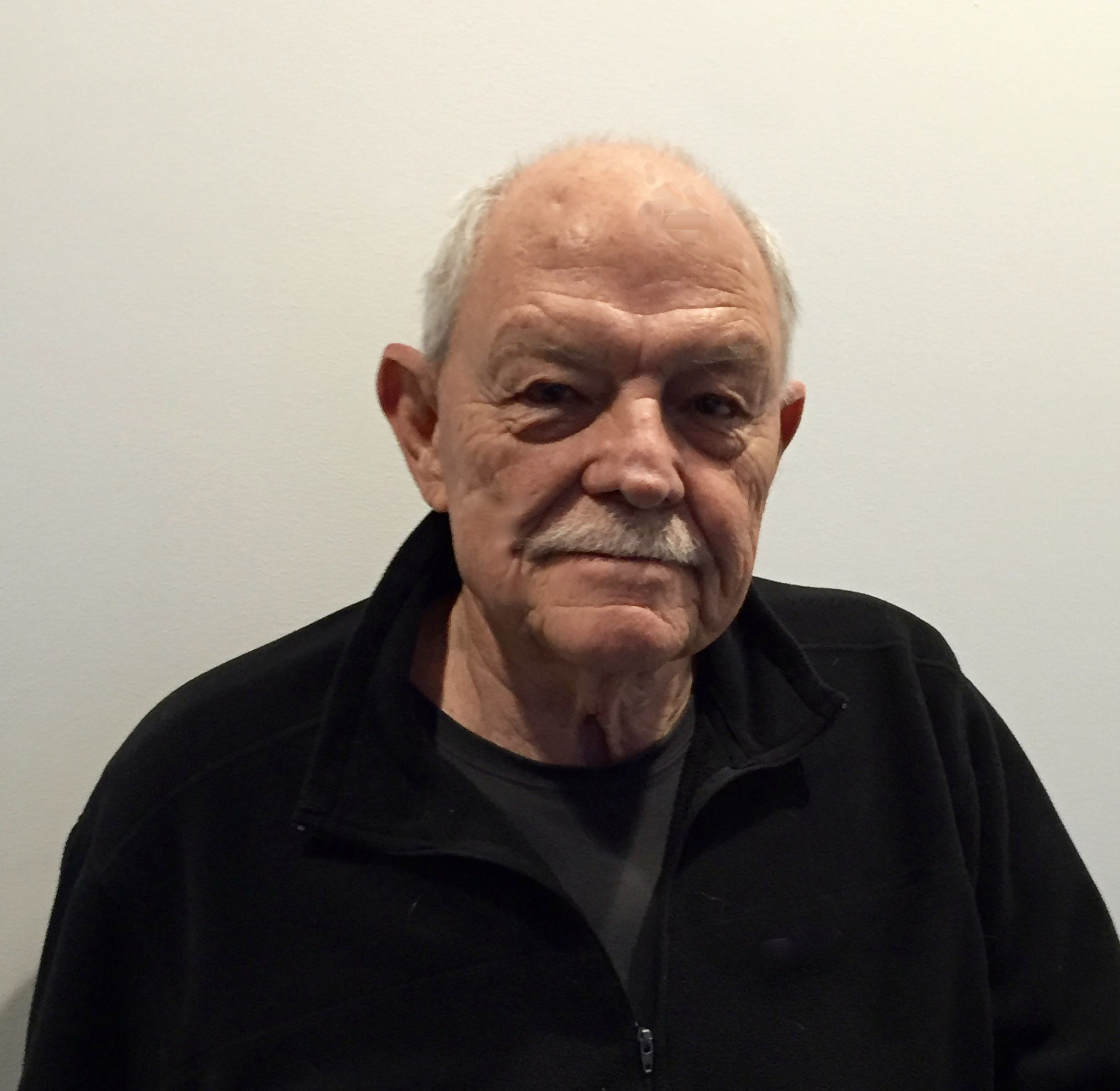
- Moore, Chapel Hill, NC January, 2016
- Born: Gerald Alan Moore; July 3, 1938 (age 88); Albuquerque, New Mexico, United States
- Education: University of New Mexico
- Occupations: Journalist, editor
- Children: Catherine Moore, Benjamin Moore, Andrew

Gerald Moore (born 1938) is an American-born writer and editor who worked at Life magazine from 1965 until 1972.

Moore covered many of the major stories of the late 1960s and early 1970s: LSD, assassinations, the 1968 Democratic National Convention in Chicago, the McCarthy campaign, urban riots, the My Lai Massacre, and the beginnings of Feminism.

== Biography ==
Gerald Moore was born in Albuquerque, New Mexico. He studied philosophy at the University of New Mexico and economics at the University of Washington in Seattle. While a student, he served for two years on the Albuquerque police department before becoming a reporter for the Albuquerque Tribune in 1963. At the Tribune he worked general assignment stories, covered county government in Bernalillo and Valencia counties and wrote a weekly column “Moore on the Arts.”

Hired by Life magazine in 1965, he moved to New York City, where he worked as a reporter in Life’s entertainment department. Six months later, he was assigned to the Los Angeles bureau as a correspondent He wrote articles on the advent of LSD, on racial tensions in Watts profiles of entertainment figures, and a major article on the politics of college students ("Who Says College Kids Have Changed”). He was named Midwestern (Chicago) Bureau Chief in 1967.

While in Chicago, he wrote about prison conditions in Arkansas ("Buried Secrets of a Prison Farm”), covered the presidential campaign of Senator Eugene McCarthy (“Everybody Loves Gene Until He Takes the Stump”). He directed Life’s coverage of the 1968 Democratic convention, and reported on conditions in Chicago’s West Side ghetto (“The Ghetto Block” Life, Mar. 8, 1968])

In 1969, he returned to New York City as an associate editor with responsibility for Life’s news department. In 1970 he was named Senior Editor. He continued to write for the magazine. When Life ended publication as a weekly magazine in December 1972, Moore turned to free-lance magazine writing. His articles appeared in People, The Saturday Evening Post Reader’s Digest, Horticulture and other national magazines.

Moore joined the New York State Department of Agriculture in 1985 as Public Information Officer. He developed and wrote speeches for three Agriculture Commissioners and drafted speeches on rural issues for Governor Mario M. Cuomo and for Mrs. Cuomo. He left state service in 1995 following Governor Cuomo's defeat in the 1994 election.

Moore's 2016 memoir is "LIFE Story: The Education of an American Journalist".
