= Elizabeth Moore (historian) =

American historian

- Born: 29 January 1894; York, South Carolina
- Died: 17 November 1976 (aged 82); Columbia, South Carolina
- Education: Winthrop College; Columbia College (A.B.)
- Occupation: Local historian
- Spouse: Walter Bedford Moore

Elizabeth Moore, née Finley (29 January 1894 – 17 November 1976), was an American local historian and preservationist.

== Life and work ==
Elizabeth Moore was born in York, South Carolina on 29 January 1894, daughter of Congressman David E. Finley and sister of David E. Finley, Jr., the founding chairman of the National Trust for Historic Preservation and first director of the National Gallery of Art. She studied at Winthrop College in 1910–11 before graduating from Columbia College with an A.B. degree in 1914. She married Walter Bedford Moore two years later and became a charter member of the Daughters of the American Revolution in 1926. From 1936 to 1938 she chaired the Columbia Sesquicentennial Historical Marker Committee. Moore helped select fifty sites in Columbia and Richland County for marking and wrote inscriptions and the guidebook. From 1940 to 1967 she was on the committee to save Columbia’s Hampton-Preston House. In 1952 she chaired the committee to preserve Fort Moultrie. Eight years later, Moore founded and became director of what would later be called the Historic Columbia Foundation which was successful in preserving some of the historic homes and structures in the city. She was able to obtain funds from the state to acquire and restore Rose Hill, the home of the secessionist Governor of South Carolina, William Henry Gist. She died in Columbia on 17 November 1976.
