= Charles W. Moore (American football) =

American football player and coach (1939 or 1940 – 2024)

Biographical details
- Born: 1939 or 1940
- Died: September 12, 2024 (aged 84); Houston, Texas, U.S.

Playing career
- 1958–1961: Tennessee State

Coaching career (HC unless noted)
- 1973–1975: Bethune–Cookman
- 1978: Langston
- 1983: District of Columbia

Administrative career (AD unless noted)
- 1978–1979: Langston

Head coaching record
- Overall: 30–23–1
- Bowls: 1–0

Accomplishments and honors

Championships
- 2 SIAC Division I (1973, 1975)

Awards
- 2× SIAC Coach of the Year (1973, 1975)

Charles Wesley Moore (1939 or 1940 – September 12, 2024) was an American college football coach and player. He served as the head football coach at Bethune–Cookman University in Daytona Beach, Florida, from 1973 to 1975, Langston University in Langston, Oklahoma, in 1977, and the University of the District of Columbia in 1983, compiling a career college football coaching record of 30–23–1.

Moore was hired as the head football coach and athletic director at Langston in 1978. He resigned in February 1979 after leading Langston to a record of 3–7 in 1978.

Moore died on September 12, 2024, at the age of 84.

== Head coaching record ==
=== College ===
Year	Team	Overall	Conference	Standing	Bowl/playoffs
Bethune–Cookman Wildcats (Southern Intercollegiate Athletic Conference) (1973–1975)
1973	Bethune–Cookman	9–2	5–0	1st (Division I)	
1974	Bethune–Cookman	8–3–1	4–1	2nd (Division I)	W Azalea Bowl
1975	Bethune–Cookman	10–1	4–1	1st (Division I)	
Bethune–Cookman:		27–6–1	13–2		
Langston Lions (NAIA Division I independent) (1978)
1978	Langston	3–7			
Langston:		3–7			
District of Columbia Firebirds (NCAA Division II independent) (1983)
1983	District of Columbia	0–10			
District of Columbia:		0–10			
Total:		30–23–1			
National championship Conference title Conference division title or championship game berth
