= Samuel Preston Moore (1710–1785) =

Samuel Preston Moore (1710–1785) was an American physician and public official.

Moore was the son of Dr. Richard Moore III and Margaret Preston. He married his cousin Hannah Hill, daughter of Dr. Richard Hill, on 12 August 1739, in Philadelphia, Pennsylvania. Together, they lived in a house on High Street in Philadelphia. They later sold a part of their property to Benjamin Franklin, who was a friend of the family. Moore served as trustee of the General Loan Office along with Humphry Marshall. He was also the provincial treasurer of the colonies of Pennsylvania from 1754 to 1768. For one year (1768–69) he served as treasurer of the Pennsylvania Hospital.

He was elected to the American Philosophical Society in 1771.

He died on 15 July 1785, in Philadelphia. He was buried in Friends Arch Street Meeting House Burial Ground, Philadelphia.
