= Gerald Moore (surgeon) =

British oral surgeon and actor

Gerald Ernest Moore (1926 – March 2018) was a British oral surgeon and child actor.

He was educated at Eltham College.

He bought Heathfield Park in 1963, where he established a riding school, wildlife park and a motor museum. He sold the estate in 1993.

In the mid-1960s, he co-founded the Cavendish Bio Medical Centre.

Moore was also an artist, whose work was exhibited from the 1950s onwards. In 2012, he established the Gerald Moore Gallery at Eltham College, which exhibits his and others' work.

== Family ==
With his first wife Irene, Moore had three sons, Julian, Adrian and Lucien. After Irene's death he married Ruth.

== Filmography ==
- Went the Day Well? (1942)

== Books ==
- The Singing Dust (1976, with Odette Tchernine)
- Treading in Treacle (1983)
