= 2019–20 Exeter City F.C. season =

Exeter City
2019–20 season
- Owner: Exeter City Supporters' Trust
- Chairman: Julian Tagg
- Manager: Matt Taylor
- Stadium: St James Park
- League Two: 5th
- FA Cup: Second round
- EFL Cup: First round
- EFL Trophy: Semi-finals
- Top goalscorer: League: Ryan Bowman (13 goals); All: Ryan Bowman (14 goals)
- Highest home attendance: 7,924 vs Plymouth Argyle, League Two, 26 October 2019
- Lowest home attendance: 483 vs Oxford United, EFL Trophy, 4 December 2019
- Average home league attendance: 4,847
- Biggest win: 5–1 vs Oldham Athletic (H), League Two, 11 February 2020; 4–0 vs Plymouth Argyle (H), League Two, 26 October 2019
- Biggest defeat: 0–4 vs Cambridge United (A), League Two, 19 October 2019; 0–4 vs Northampton Town (N), League Two play-off final, 29 June 2020
Home colours	Away colours	Third colours

The 2019–20 Exeter City season was the club's 118th year in existence and their eighth consecutive season in League Two. The club reached the semi-finals of the EFL Trophy. City were eliminated in the second round of the FA Cup, and in the first round of the EFL Cup.

The season covers the period from 1 July 2019 to 30 June 2020.

== Background and pre-season ==
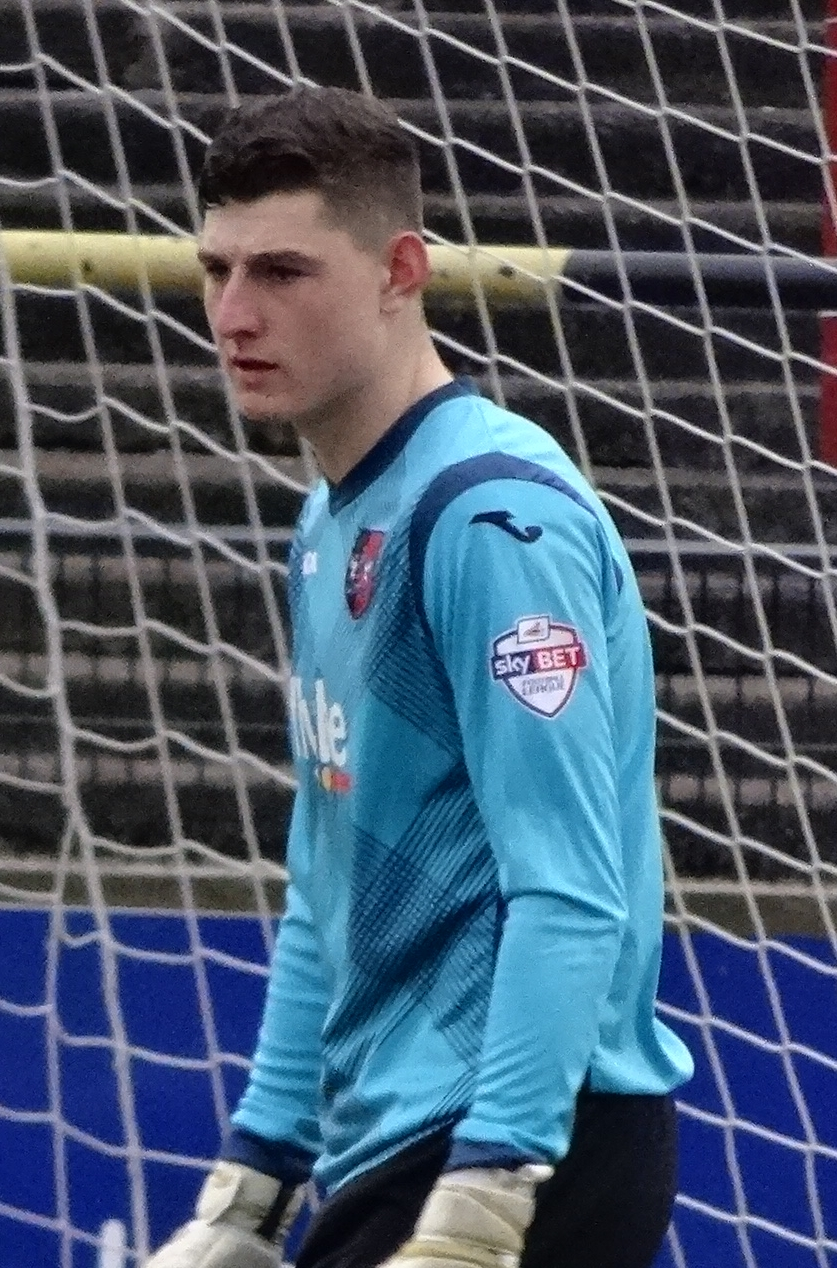
James Hamon was one of eight to depart in pre-season.

The 2018–19 was Matt Taylor's first season as Exeter City manager, having taken over from Paul Tisdale in the summer of 2018. Exeter finished the season in 9th place, one point outside the play-offs, and was knocked out of all domestic cups in the early stages.

The Grecians' prospects for the season were further hit by the departures of Christy Pym and Hiram Boateng on free transfers to Peterborough United and MK Dons respectively. Goalkeepers James Hamon and Felix Norman; defenders Troy Brown, Luke Croll and Jimmy Oates; and midfielder Max Smallcombe also departed following the expiration of their contracts. Goalkeeping coach Chris Weale, who had also been named on the subs bench during the previous season, also left the club, as did assistant manager Eric Kinder, strength and conditioning coach Andrew Wiseman, physiotherapist Adey Saunderson and sports rehabilitator Jess Preece. Former Exeter City midfielder Wayne Carlisle was promoted to the role of assistant manager, Steve Hale was brought in as goalkeeping coach, Connor Durbridge became the club's new strength and conditioning coach, and Gareth Law and Dan Feasey joined as club physiotherapists.

Nine new players arrived at St James Park during July, eight on a permanent basis and one on loan. The loan arrival was Robbie Cundy, who had spent the previous season on loan at Bath City, joining from EFL Championship side Bristol City until the end of the season. Nigel Atangana and Tom Parkes signed from fellow EFL League Two sides Cheltenham Town and Carlisle United on free transfers, while goalkeepers Lewis Ward and Jonny Maxted, and striker Nicky Ajose dropped down from higher divisions. Veteran defender Gary Warren signed on a free transfer from Yeovil Town, as did journeyman striker Alex Fisher. Noah Smerdon signed from Gloucester City, and soon after was loaned out (alongside young centre-back Jordan Dyer) to Tiverton Town until January 2020.

A further four City youngsters departed St James Park on loan to clubs in the south-west of England before the start of the season. Theo Simpson joined Barnstaple Town on loan, initially until August; Joel Randall and Will Dean joined the recently relegated Weston-super-Mare and Truro City until January; and Alex Hartridge signed a six-month loan deal with National League South side Bath City.

A new fluorescent yellow and purple away kit, replacing a fluorescent yellow kit that had been worn the previous three seasons, was unveiled on 3 July 2019. The Grecians unveiled a new black and red third kit during the early stages of the season. Both kits were supplied by Joma and sponsored by Flybe.

The club announced their pre-season schedule on 16 June 2019.

Pre-season match details
Date	Opponents	Venue	Result	Score F–A	Scorers	Attendance	Ref.
28 June 2019	Jersey	A	W	5–0	R Bowman (20', 32'), P Sweeney (29'), L Holmes (55'), B Seymour (56')	367	
5 July 2019	Truro City	A	D	0–0		396	
9 July 2019	Tiverton Town	A	W	1–0	B Seymour (48')		
12 July 2019	Bath City	A	W	3–0	R Bowman (5', 30'), A Collins (29')	367	
16 July 2019	Weston-super-Mare	A	W	3–0	R Bowman (25'), J Randall (87'), J Sparkes (90'+1)		
21 July 2019	Swansea City	H	L	1–3	N Law (56' pen)	2,486	
25 July 2019	Taunton Town	A	D	2–2	B Seymour (81'), W Dean (90'+2)	683	
27 July 2019	Torquay United	A	W	2–1	T Parkes (43'), R Williams (52')	2,744	

== Review ==
=== August ===
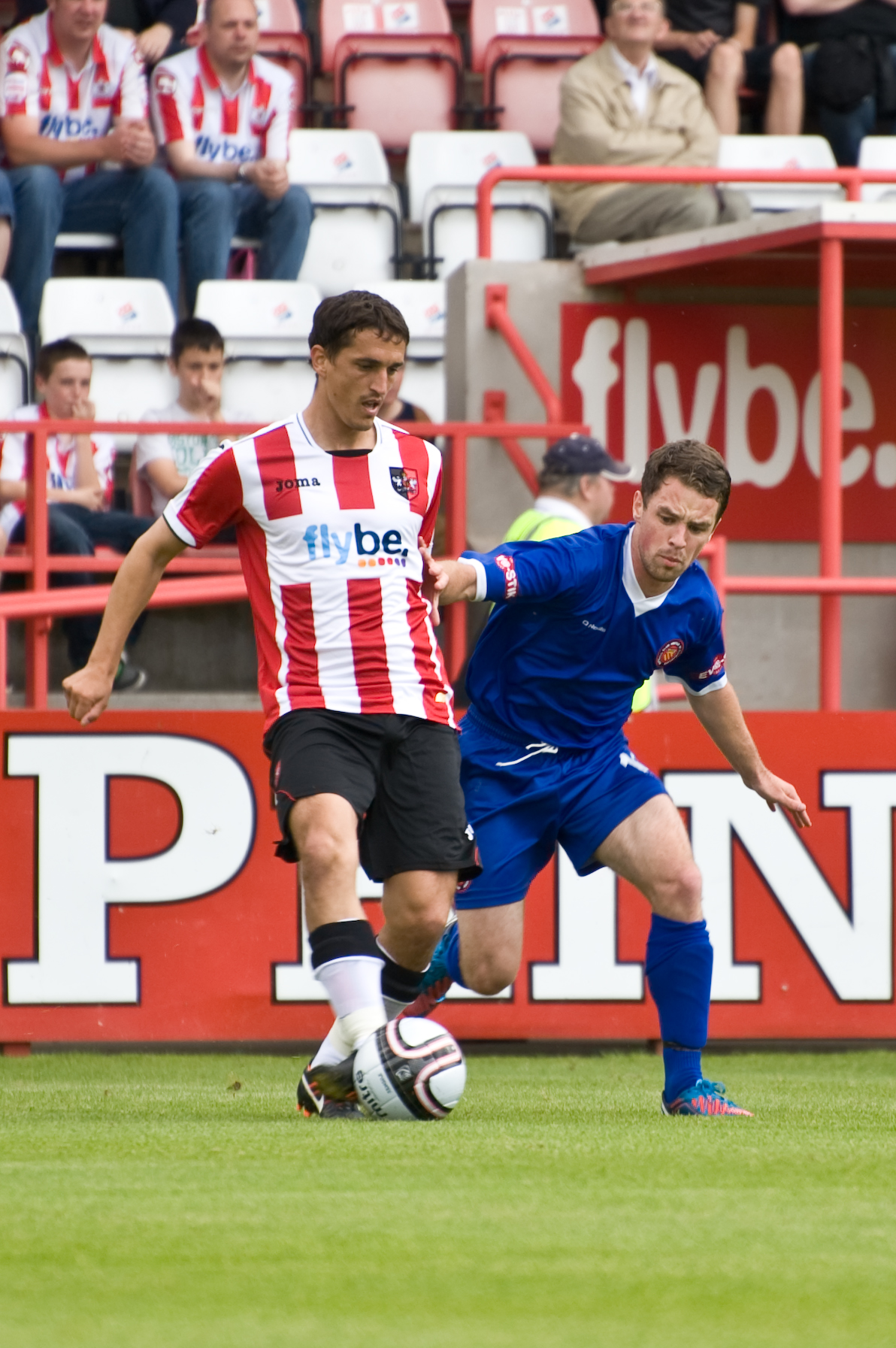
Craig Woodman played in 4 of Exeter's August fixtures.

A late Ryan Bowman goal sealed an opening day victory for Exeter against Sol Campbell's Macclesfield Town at St James Park, in a game watched by 4,502. City made it two on the spin against Stevenage Town, again courtesy of a late goal, this time through Nicky Law. In good form, an away EFL Cup tie against Coventry City F.C. beckoned. City however failed to carry over their league form, with a young side (featuring Ben Chrisene, who aged 15 years, 7 months and 1 day, became the club's youngest ever player to make a senior appearance) being defeated 4–1, with Sweeney scoring a consolation goal.

Exeter were on the wrong end of a late equalising goal in their third league game of the season, against Swindon Town, though they moved up to second in the table (behind Swindon) despite dropping points. They were further frustrated against Oldham Athletic, failing to win despite creating good chances against the Latics. Another late goal, again scored by Nicky Law, helped Exeter return to winning ways in a 2–3 win over Morecambe, moving them to the top of the table – one point above fierce rivals Plymouth Argyle. Ryan Bowman's early goal against Mansfield Town was enough to secure victory, and ensure that City finished the month unbeaten in the league. Manager Matt Taylor subsequently won the EFL League Two August Manager of the Month award.

There was relatively little transfer activity in the second half of the summer transfer window for Exeter, with Matt Taylor in advance ruling out any late moves in the transfer market. Jayden Richardson joined from Nottingham Forest on a season-long loan on 16 September, while young midfielder Harry Kite embarked on a loan move of his own, to Taunton Town, that same day. Barbadian striker Jonathan Forte, who had signed for Exeter the previous summer, was forced to retire aged 33 due to a 'severe' knee injury during sustained the previous season.

== Transfers ==
=== Transfers in ===
Date	Position	Nationality	Name	From	Fee	Ref.
1 July 2019	DM	(France)	Nigel Atangana	Cheltenham Town	Free transfer	
1 July 2019	CF	(England)	Alex Fisher	Yeovil Town	Free transfer	
1 July 2019	GK	(England)	Johnny Maxted	Accrington Stanley	Free transfer	
1 July 2019	CB	(England)	Tom Parkes	Carlisle United	Free transfer	
1 July 2019	GK	(England)	Lewis Ward	Reading	Free transfer	
1 July 2019	CB	(England)	Gary Warren	Yeovil Town	Free transfer	
3 July 2019	CF	(England)	Nicky Ajose	Charlton Athletic	Free transfer	
9 July 2019	DF	(England)	Noah Smerdon	Gloucester City	Undisclosed	
11 October 2019	GK	(South Africa)	Dino Visser	(South Africa) Cape Umoya United	Free transfer	
17 January 2020	LM	(England)	Brennan Dickenson	Milton Keynes Dons	Free transfer	
19 February 2020	GK	(Northern Ireland)	Jared Thompson	Free agent	Free transfer	

=== Transfers out ===
Date	Position	Nationality	Name	To	Fee	Ref.
1 July 2019	DM	(England)	Hiram Boateng	Milton Keynes Dons	Compensation	
1 July 2019	CB	(Wales)	Troy Brown	Dundee United	Released	
1 July 2019	CB	(England)	Luke Croll	Dagenham & Redbridge	Released	
1 July 2019	GK	(Guernsey)	James Hamon	Truro City	Released	
1 July 2019	GK	(England)	Felix Norman	Free agent	Released	
1 July 2019	RB	(Australia)	Jimmy Oates	Free agent	Released	
1 July 2019	GK	(England)	Christy Pym	Peterborough United	Free transfer	
1 July 2019	RM	(Wales)	Max Smallcombe	Free agent	Released	
1 August 2019	CF	(England)	Jay Stansfield	Fulham	Undisclosed	
20 August 2019	CF	(Barbados)	Jonathan Forte	Retired	—N/a	
15 January 2020	DM	(England)	Jordan Tillson	Ross County	Undisclosed	
15 January 2020	GK	(South Africa)	Dino Visser	Crewe Alexandra	Released	

=== Loans in ===
Date from	Position	Nationality	Name	From	Date until	Ref.
5 July 2019	CB	(England)	Robbie Cundy	Bristol City	3 September 2019	
16 August 2019	DF	(England)	Jayden Richardson	Nottingham Forest	30 June 2020	

=== Loans out ===
Date from	Position	Nationality	Name	To	Date until	Ref.
1 July 2019	CF	(England)	Theo Simpson	Barnstaple Town	August 2019	
12 July 2019	LB	(England)	Alex Hartridge	Bath City	January 2020	
19 July 2019	CB	(England)	Jordan Dyer	Tiverton Town	18 January 2019	
19 July 2019	MF	(England)	Noah Smerdon	Tiverton Town	18 January 2019	
1 August 2019	MF	(England)	Joel Randall	Weston-super-Mare	4 December 2019	
2 August 2019	CM	(England)	Will Dean	Truro City	January 2020	
16 August 2019	AM	(England)	Harry Kite	Taunton Town	January 2020	
6 December 2019	AM	(England)	Joel Randall	Weymouth	January 2020	
9 January 2020	CB	(England)	Gary Warren	Torquay United	February 2020	

== Fixtures ==
=== League Two ===
On Thursday, 20 June 2019, the EFL League Two fixtures were revealed.

EFL League Two match details
Date	League position	Opponents	Venue	Result	Score F–A	Scorers	Attendance	Ref.
3 August 2019	6th	Macclesfield Town	H	W	1–0	R Bowman (88')	4,502	
10 August 2019	3rd	Stevenage	A	W	1–0	N Law (89')	2,398	
17 August 2019	2nd	Swindon Town	H	D	1–1	M Jay (72')	5,435	
20 August 2019	4th	Oldham Athletic	A	D	0–0		2,805	
24 August 2019	1st	Morecambe	A	W	3–2	J Taylor (21'), L Martin (25'), N Law (85')	1,517	
31 August 2019	1st	Mansfield Town	H	W	1–0	R Bowman (72')	4,316	
7 September 2019	1st	Carlisle United	A	W	3–1	L Martin (36'), A Martin (67'), N Law (90'+1)	4,167	
14 September 2019	1st	Leyton Orient	H	D	2–2	P Sweeney (41'), N Law (90'+2 pen.)	4,933	
17 September 2019	1st	Port Vale	H	W	2–0	R Bowman (81'), K Kennedy (89' og)	3,765	
21 September 2019	1st	Newport County	A	D	1–1	L Martin (15')	4,762	
28 September 2019	1st	Grimsby Town	H	L	1–3	R Bowman (90'+4)	4,973	
5 October 2019	2nd	Crewe Alexandra	A	D	1–1	D Moxey (2')	5,131	
12 October 2019	2nd	Forest Green Rovers	H	W	1–0	R Bowman (11')	5,312	
19 October 2019	4th	Cambridge United	A	L	0–4		3,816	
22 October 2019	5th	Scunthorpe United	A	L	1–3	M Jay (27')	3,055	
26 October 2019	2nd	Plymouth Argyle	H	W	4–0	N Law (42' pen., 83'), T Parkes (49'), R Williams (67')	7,924	
2 November 2019	5th	Bradford City	A	L	0–2		14,002	
16 November 2019	5th	Cheltenham Town	H	D	0–0		4,956	
23 November 2019	4th	Crawley Town	A	W	1–0	D Moxey (77')	2,170	
7 December 2019	2nd	Northampton Town	H	W	3–2	R Williams (38'), A Martin (64'), A Fisher (66')	3,971	
14 December 2019	2nd	Salford City	A	W	1–0	R Bowman (33')	2,922	
21 December 2019	2nd	Walsall	H	D	3–3	R Bowman (32', 41'), L Martin (64')	4,323	
26 December 2019	2nd	Newport County	H	W	1–0	L Martin (14')	5,968	
29 December 2019	2nd	Colchester United	A	D	2–2	J Taylor (8'), R Bowman (77' pen.)	4,739	
1 January 2020	2nd	Forest Green Rovers	A	W	1–0	N Atangana (5')	3,012	
11 January 2020	2nd	Cambridge United	H	W	2–0	R Bowman (53'), R Williams (81')	4,517	
18 January 2020	2nd	Grimsby Town	A	W	1–0	N Law (67')	6,021	
25 January 2020	2nd	Colchester United	H	D	0–0		4,745	
28 January 2020	2nd	Port Vale	A	L	1–3	N Ajose (22')	3,347	
1 February 2020	4th	Swindon Town	A	L	1–2	R Williams (34')	13,095	
8 February 2020	3rd	Stevenage	H	W	2–1	R Williams (36'), M Jay (81')	4,458	
11 February 2020	3rd	Oldham Athletic	H	W	5–1	J Richardson (20'), M Jay (43' pen.), A Collins (51'), R Bowman (61'), B Dickenson (90+3')	3,527	
15 February 2020	2nd	Macclesfield Town	A	W	3–2	N Ajose (11'), P Sweeney (17'), R Bowman (86')	1,389	
22 February 2020	3rd	Northampton Town	A	L	0–2		5,046	
29 February 2020	3rd	Crawley Town	H	D	1–1	B Dickenson (82')	5,404	
3 March 2020	4th	Crewe Alexandra	H	D	1–1	T Parkes (32')	4,221	
7 March 2020	4th	Walsall	A	L	1–3	R Bowman (51')	5,521	
14 March 2020	4th	Salford City	H	P	v			
17 March 2020	4th	Scunthorpe United	H	P	v			

==== League table ====
Pos	Team	Pld	W	D	L	GF	GA	GD	Pts	PPG	Promotion, qualification or relegation
1	Swindon Town (C, P)	36	21	6	9	62	39	+23	69	1.92	Promotion to EFL League One
2	Crewe Alexandra (P)	37	20	9	8	67	43	+24	69	1.86	Promotion to EFL League One
3	Plymouth Argyle (P)	37	20	8	9	61	39	+22	68	1.84	Promotion to EFL League One
4	Cheltenham Town	36	17	13	6	52	27	+25	64	1.78	Qualification for League Two play-offs (Note: Four teams play for one spot and promotion to EFL League One.)
5	Exeter City	37	18	11	8	53	43	+10	65	1.76	Qualification for League Two play-offs
6	Colchester United	37	15	13	9	52	37	+15	58	1.57	Qualification for League Two play-offs
7	Northampton Town (O, P)	37	17	7	13	54	40	+14	58	1.57	Qualification for League Two play-offs
8	Port Vale	37	14	15	8	50	44	+6	57	1.54	
9	Bradford City	37	14	12	11	44	40	+4	54	1.46	

Source: EFL Official Website
Rules for classification: 1) Points per game; 2) Goal difference; 3) Number of goals scored; 4) Head-to-head results; 5) Wins; 6) Away goals; 7) Penalty points (sec 9.5); 8) 12-point sending off offences
(C) Champions; (O) Play-off winners; (P) Promoted

==== Play-offs ====
EFL League Two match details
Date	Round	Opponents	Venue	Result	Score F–A	Scorers	Attendance	Ref.
18 June 2020	Semi-final first leg	Colchester United	A	L	0–1		0	
22 June 2020	Semi-final second leg	Colchester United	H	W	3–1 (a.e.t.)	A Martin (10'), J Richardson (58'), R Bowman (111')	0	
29 June 2020	Final	Northampton Town	N	L	0–4		0	

=== FA Cup ===
The first round draw was made on 21 October 2019.

FA Cup match details
Round	Date	Opponents	Venue	Result	Score F–A	Scorers	Attendance	Ref.
First round	9 November 2019	Cambridge United	A	D	1–1	A Fisher (34')	2,302	
First round replay	19 November 2019	Cambridge United	H	W	1–0	A Fisher (70')	2,719	
Second round	1 December 2019	Hartlepool United	H	D	2–2	R Bowman (21'), N Atangana (29')	3,638	
Second round replay	10 December 2019	Hartlepool United	A	L	0–1 (a.e.t.)		2,398	

=== EFL Cup ===
The first round draw was made on 20 June.

EFL Cup match details
Round	Date	Opponents	Venue	Result	Score F–A	Scorers	Attendance	Ref.
First round	13 August 2019	Coventry City	A	L	1–4	P Sweeney (81')	1,555	

=== EFL Trophy ===
On 9 July 2019, the pre-determined group stage draw was announced with Invited clubs to be drawn on 12 July 2019.

EFL Trophy match details
Round	Date	Opponents	Venue	Result	Score F–A	Scorers	Attendance	Ref.
Group stage	3 September 2019	Cheltenham Town	H	W	1–0	N Ajose (5')	786	
Group stage	8 October 2019	Newport County	A	W	2–0	M Jay (40', 71')	635	
Group stage	14 November 2019	West Ham United U21	H	W	3–1	J Randall (9', 88'), J Tillson (78')	807	
Second round	4 December 2019	Oxford United	H	D	0–0 (3–0 p)		483	
Third round	4 January 2020	Ipswich Town	H	W	2–1	N Ajose (45'), L Martin (90+3')	2,299	
Quarter-final	21 January 2020	Stevenage	H	W	3–0	N Ajose (25'), M Jay (30', 48')	1,190	
Semi-final	18 February 2020	Portsmouth	A	L	2–3	J Taylor 79', C Burgess 89' (o.g.)	14,735	

==== Table (group stage) ====
Pos	Div	Team	Pld	W	PW	PL	L	GF	GA	GD	Pts	Qualification
1	L2	Exeter City	3	3	0	0	0	6	1	+5	9	Advance to Round 2
2	L2	Newport County	3	1	0	0	2	11	11	0	3	Advance to Round 2
3	ACA	West Ham United U21	3	1	0	0	2	9	11	−2	3	
4	L2	Cheltenham Town	3	1	0	0	2	8	11	−3	3	

Source: EFL.com

== Statistics ==
As of 19 June 2020

No.	Pos	Nat	Player	Total		League Two		FA Cup		League Cup		League Trophy	
No.	Pos	Nat	Player	Apps	Goals	Apps	Goals	Apps	Goals	Apps	Goals	Apps	Goals
1	GK	(England) ENG	Lewis Ward	22	0	20+0	0	0+0	0	0+0	0	2+0	0
2	DF	(Republic of Ireland) IRL	Pierce Sweeney	44	3	34+1	2	4+0	0	1+0	1	2+2	0
3	DF	(England) ENG	Craig Woodman	12	0	4+2	0	2+0	0	0+1	0	3+0	0
4	MF	(France) FRA	Nigel Atangana	28	2	18+4	1	2+2	1	0+0	0	2+0	0
5	DF	(England) ENG	Aaron Martin	42	2	32+3	2	4+0	0	0+1	0	1+1	0
7	MF	(England) ENG	Lee Martin	35	7	20+7	6	2+2	0	1+0	0	2+1	1
8	MF	(England) ENG	Nicky Law	37	7	29+4	7	3+0	0	0+0	0	1+0	0
10	MF	(England) ENG	Lee Holmes	1	0	0+0	0	0+0	0	0+0	0	0+1	0
11	MF	(England) ENG	Randell Williams	43	5	33+4	5	3+1	0	0+0	0	0+2	0
12	FW	(England) ENG	Ryan Bowman	44	14	36+1	14	3+0	0	0+0	0	1+3	0
14	FW	(England) ENG	Nicky Ajose	16	5	10+3	2	0+0	0	0+0	0	3+0	3
15	DF	(England) ENG	Tom Parkes	37	2	25+5	2	2+0	0	0+0	0	5+0	0
16	DF	(England) ENG	Gary Warren	5	0	0+1	0	0+0	0	1+0	0	3+0	0
17	FW	(England) ENG	Matt Jay	22	8	9+5	4	2+0	0	1+0	0	5+0	4
18	FW	(England) ENG	Alex Fisher	24	3	3+13	1	2+1	2	0+1	0	4+0	0
20	DF	(England) ENG	Jayden Richardson	26	1	10+8	1	1+0	0	0+0	0	6+1	0
21	DF	(England) ENG	Dean Moxey	30	2	21+3	2	2+1	0	1+0	0	2+0	0
22	MF	(England) ENG	Jack Sparkes	23	0	17+0	0	2+1	0	1+0	0	1+1	0
23	GK	(England) ENG	Jonny Maxted	25	0	17+0	0	4+0	0	1+0	0	3+0	0
24	MF	(England) ENG	Brennan Dickenson	10	2	8+2	2	0+0	0	0+0	0	0+0	0
25	MF	(Wales) WAL	Jake Taylor	40	3	24+9	2	1+1	0	0+0	0	5+0	1
26	MF	(England) ENG	Joel Randall	7	2	0+2	0	0+0	0	0+0	0	5+0	2
27	MF	(England) ENG	Archie Collins	41	1	33+3	1	3+0	0	1+0	0	0+1	0
29	MF	(England) ENG	Harry Kite	2	0	0+0	0	0+0	0	0+0	0	2+0	0
30	MF	(England) ENG	Joshua Key	2	0	0+0	0	0+0	0	0+0	0	1+1	0
32	MF	(England) ENG	Ben Chrisene	5	0	0+1	0	0+0	0	0+1	0	0+3	0
34	DF	(England) ENG	Alex Hartridge	2	0	0+0	0	0+0	0	0+0	0	2+0	0
35	FW	(England) ENG	Ben Seymour	22	0	3+8	0	1+2	0	1+0	0	4+3	0
37	DF	(England) ENG	Jordan Dyer	3	0	0+0	0	0+0	0	0+0	0	3+0	0
41	MF	(England) ENG	Will Dean	3	0	0+0	0	0+0	0	0+0	0	2+1	0
Players who left during the season:
6	MF	(England) ENG	Jordan Tillson	8	1	0+2	0	0+1	0	1+0	0	4+0	1
40	GK	(South Africa) RSA	Dino Visser	2	0	0+0	0	0+0	0	0+0	0	2+0	0

=== Goals record ===
As of 19 June 2020

Rank	No.	Nat.	Po.	Name	League Two	FA Cup	League Cup	League Trophy	Total
1	12	(England)	CF	Ryan Bowman	14	0	0	0	14
2	17	(England)	SS	Matt Jay	4	0	0	4	8
3	7	(England)	AM	Lee Martin	6	0	0	1	7
3	8	(England)	CM	Nicky Law	7	0	0	0	7
5	11	(England)	RW	Randall Williams	5	0	0	0	5
5	14	(England)	CF	Nicky Ajose	2	0	0	3	5
7	2	(Republic of Ireland)	RB	Pierce Sweeney	2	0	1	0	3
7	18	(England)	CF	Alex Fisher	1	2	0	0	3
7	25	(Wales)	CM	Jake Taylor	2	0	0	1	3
10	4	(France)	DM	Nigel Atangana	1	1	0	0	2
10	5	(England)	CB	Aaron Martin	2	0	0	0	2
10	15	(England)	CB	Tom Parkes	2	0	0	0	2
10	21	(England)	LB	Dean Moxey	2	0	0	0	2
10	24	(England)	LM	Brennan Dickenson	2	0	0	0	2
10	26	(England)	AM	Joel Randall	0	0	0	2	2
17	~~6~~	(England)	DM	Jordan Tillson	0	0	0	1	1
17	20	(England)	RB	Jayden Richardson	1	0	0	0	1
17	27	(England)	CM	Archie Collins	1	0	0	0	1
Total					53	3	1	12	69

=== Disciplinary record ===
As of 19 June 2020

Rank	No.	Nat.	Po.	Name	League Two			FA Cup			League Cup			League Trophy			Total		
Rank	No.	Nat.	Po.	Name	Booked	(yellow card) (yellow-red card)	Sent off (straight red)	Booked	(yellow card) (yellow-red card)	Sent off (straight red)	Booked	(yellow card) (yellow-red card)	Sent off (straight red)	Booked	(yellow card) (yellow-red card)	Sent off (straight red)	Booked	(yellow card) (yellow-red card)	Sent off (straight red)
1	12	(England)	CF	Ryan Bowman	7	0	0	1	0	0	0	0	0	0	0	0	8	0	0
2	2	(Republic of Ireland)	RB	Pierce Sweeney	4	0	0	2	0	0	0	0	0	0	0	0	6	0	0
2	5	(England)	CB	Aaron Martin	4	0	0	2	0	0	0	0	0	0	0	0	6	0	0
4	15	(England)	CB	Tom Parkes	4	0	1	0	0	0	0	0	0	0	0	0	4	0	1
4	22	(England)	LM	Jack Sparkes	2	1	0	1	0	0	0	0	0	0	0	0	3	1	0
4	25	(Wales)	CM	Jake Taylor	3	0	1	1	0	0	0	0	0	0	0	0	4	0	1
4	27	(England)	CM	Archie Collins	5	0	0	0	0	0	0	0	0	0	0	0	5	0	0
9	11	(England)	RW	Randall Williams	4	0	0	0	0	0	0	0	0	0	0	0	4	0	0
10	~~6~~	(England)	DM	Jordan Tillson	0	0	0	1	0	0	1	0	0	1	0	0	3	0	0
10	7	(England)	AM	Lee Martin	3	0	0	0	0	0	0	0	0	0	0	0	3	0	0
12	4	(France)	DM	Nigel Atangana	1	0	1	0	0	0	0	0	0	0	0	0	1	0	1
12	8	(England)	CM	Nicky Law	2	0	0	0	0	0	0	0	0	0	0	0	2	0	0
12	16	(England)	CB	Gary Warren	0	0	0	0	0	0	0	0	0	2	0	0	2	0	0
12	17	(England)	SS	Matt Jay	1	0	0	0	0	0	0	0	0	1	0	0	2	0	0
12	18	(England)	CF	Alex Fisher	1	0	0	0	0	0	0	0	0	1	0	0	2	0	0
12	21	(England)	LB	Dean Moxey	2	0	0	0	0	0	0	0	0	0	0	0	2	0	0
12	24	(England)	LM	Brennan Dickenson	2	0	0	0	0	0	0	0	0	0	0	0	2	0	0
12	26	(England)	RW	Joel Randall	0	0	0	0	0	0	0	0	0	1	0	0	2	0	0
20	20	(England)	RB	Jayden Richardson	1	0	0	0	0	0	0	0	0	0	0	0	1	0	0
20	41	(England)	DM	Will Dean	0	0	0	0	0	0	0	0	0	1	0	0	1	0	0
Total					47	0	3	8	1	0	1	0	0	7	0	0	63	1	3
