= 2019–20 Premier League Cup =

Tournament details
- Country: England; Wales
- Teams: 40

Final positions
- Champions: None

Tournament statistics
- Matches played: 108
- Goals scored: 351 (3.25 per match)
- Top goal scorer: (England) Jahmal Hector-Ingram Derby County (8 Goals)

The 2019–20 Premier League Cup was the seventh edition of the competition. The defending champions were Everton, who won the 2018–19 competition. This edition of the tournament did not crown a champion as it was cancelled at the Round of 16 stage, due to the COVID-19 Pandemic in the United Kingdom.

== Participants ==
40 teams competed in the competition this season, 4 more than the previous season. Notts County, and Peterborough United did not return after last year's competition, while Bristol City, Leicester City, Norwich City, and Sheffield United did not return after 6 seasons of playing in the competition.

5 teams return to the competition this time around. Crystal Palace returned for the first time since the inaugural competition, Huddersfield Town returned for the first time since 2016-2017, and Middlesbrough, Watford, and Wigan Athletic returned after missing last year's competition. Meanwhile Cambridge United, Fleetwood Town, Scunthorpe United, Shrewsbury Town, and Yeovil Town will compete in the competition for the very first time.

=== Category 1 ===
- Aston Villa
- Blackburn Rovers
- Crystal Palace
- Derby County
- Everton
- Fulham
- Liverpool
- Middlesbrough
- Newcastle United
- Reading
- Southampton
- Stoke City
- Sunderland
- Swansea City
- West Bromwich Albion
- Wolverhampton Wanderers

=== Category 2 ===
- Birmingham City
- Burnley
- Charlton Athletic
- Colchester United
- Hull City
- Leeds United
- Nottingham Forest
- Watford
- Wigan Athletic

=== Category 3 ===
- AFC Bournemouth
- Bristol Rovers
- Cambridge United
- Doncaster Rovers
- Exeter City
- Fleetwood Town
- Newport County
- Oxford United
- Plymouth Argyle
- Portsmouth
- Scunthorpe United
- Shrewsbury Town
- Southend United
- Yeovil Town

=== Category 4 ===
- Huddersfield Town

== Qualifying round ==
A qualifying round was required to finalise the 32 teams that would enter the Group Stage.

| 15 August 2019 | Bristol Rovers | 0–2 | Cambridge United | Bristol |
| | | | | Stadium: Memorial Stadium |

| 23 August 2019 | Southend United | 4–1 | Fleetwood Town | Southend-on-Sea |
| 19:00 | Acquah 8', 36'; Rush 45+1', 69' | Report | Saunders 20' | Stadium: Roots Hall; Attendance: 151 |

| 27 August 2019 | Scunthorpe United | 2–0 | Shrewsbury Town | Scunthorpe |
| 19:00 | McAtee 49'; Colclough 52' | | | Stadium: Glanford Park |

| 30 August 2019 | Newport County | 2–10 | Yeovil Town | Newport |
| 19:00 | 39' 50' | Report | 19' 19' 22' 26' 31' 55' 73' 79' 84' 90' | Stadium: Dragon Park |

| 9 September 2019 | Huddersfield Town | 4–0 | Oxford United | Huddersfield |
| 19:00 | High 3'; Stanković 8'; Rowe 85'; Koroma 90' | Report | | Stadium: John Smiths' Stadium |

| 10 September 2019 | Cambridge United | 0–2 | Exeter City | Cambridge |
| 19:00 | | | Fisher 38'; Seymour 90+3' | Stadium: Abbey Stadium; Attendance: BCD |

| 10 September 2019 | Southend United | 1–3 | Scunthorpe United | Southend-on-Sea |
| 19:00 | Rush 66' | Report | McAtee 2'; Hammill, | Stadium: Roots Hall; Attendance: 178 |

| 10 September 2019 | Plymouth Argyle | 2–0 | Yeovil Town | Plymouth |
| 19:00 | Lolos 34'; Sangster 78' | Report | | Stadium: Home Park; Attendance: 297 |

== Group stage ==
Teams play each other twice, with the group winners and runners–up advance to the round of 16.

=== Group A ===
| Team | Pld | W | D | L | GF | GA | GD | Pts |
|---|---|---|---|---|---|---|---|---|
| Charlton Athletic | 6 | 3 | 1 | 2 | 14 | 10 | +4 | 10 |
| Reading | 6 | 2 | 4 | 0 | 10 | 8 | +2 | 10 |
| Colchester United | 5 | 1 | 2 | 2 | 5 | 8 | −3 | 5 |
| Swansea City | 5 | 1 | 1 | 3 | 5 | 8 | −3 | 4 |

Updated to match(es) played on 24 February 2020. Source:

| 4 October 2019 | Charlton Athletic | 1–2 | Swansea City | Dartford |
| 13:00 | Davison 28' | | Jones-Thomas 15', 69' | Stadium: Princes Park |

| 7 October 2019 | Reading | 2–2 | Colchester United | Reading |
| 15:00 | Neves 9'; Osho 80' (pen.) | | Elias-Michal 18'; Hutchinson 90+3' | Stadium: Madjeski Stadium; Attendance: 161 |

| 7 November 2019 | Colchester United | 0–1 | Charlton Athletic | Colchester |
| 19:00 | | | Isiaka 50' | Stadium: Colchester Community Stadium |

| 8 November 2019 | Reading | 1–0 | Swansea City | Woking |
| 15:00 | Boyé 42' | | | Stadium: Kingfield Stadium |

| 28 November 2019 | Reading | 3–2 | Swansea City | Reading |
| 15:00 | Howe 45'; Liddle 72', 90+1' | | Henry 62'; Quitirna 80' (pen.) | Stadium: Madjeski Stadium |

| 30 November 2019 | Swansea City | 0–1 | Colchester United | Landore |
| 14:00 | | | Elias-Michal 24' | Stadium: Landore Training Centre |

| 18 January 2020 | Swansea City | 2–4 | Charlton Athletic | Landore |
| 13:00 | Cullen 14', 64' | | Aneke 5', 32', 37'; Powell 28' | Stadium: Landore Training Centre |

| 30 January 2020 | Colchester United | 1–1 | Reading | Colchester |
| 19:00 | Hasanally 72' | | Frost 37' | Stadium: Colchester Community Stadium |

| 8 February 2020 | Swansea City | 1–1 | Reading | Landore |
| 13:00 | Evans 16' | | Pendlebury 81' | Stadium: Landore Training Centre |

| 10 February 2020 | Charlton Athletic | 4–1 | Colchester United | Dartford |
| 13:00 | Davison 13', 19', 68' (pen.); Vennings 24' (pen.) | | Hutchinson 56' | Stadium: Princes Park |

| 24 February 2020 | Charlton Athletic | 2–2 | Reading | Dartford |
| 13:00 | Quitirna 12'; Morgan 76' (pen.) | | McGiff 26'; Ajose 72' | Stadium: Princes Park |

=== Group B ===
| Team | Pld | W | D | L | GF | GA | GD | Pts |
|---|---|---|---|---|---|---|---|---|
| Everton | 6 | 4 | 1 | 1 | 14 | 5 | +9 | 13 |
| Fulham | 6 | 3 | 0 | 3 | 13 | 11 | +2 | 9 |
| Watford | 6 | 2 | 1 | 3 | 7 | 11 | −4 | 7 |
| Plymouth Argyle | 6 | 1 | 2 | 3 | 6 | 13 | −7 | 5 |

Updated to match(es) played on 25 February 2020. Source:

| 3 October 2019 | Plymouth Argyle | 1–1 | Watford | Plymouth |
| 19:00 | Tomlinson 86' | | Bennetts 18' | Stadium: Home Park; Attendance: 151; Referee: Samuel Allison |

| 6 October 2019 | Fulham | 2–1 | Everton | New Malden |
| 11:00 | de la Torre 36'; Hilton 78' | | John 66' | Stadium: Motspur Park |

| 10 November 2019 | Fulham | 3–4 | Watford | New Malden |
| 12:00 | Carvalho 26'; Harris 48'; Edun 60' | | Hungbo 35', 72'; Hinds 50'; Deeney 69' | Stadium: Motspur Park |

| 10 November 2019 | Everton | 1–1 | Plymouth Argyle | Southport |
| 14:00 | Charsley 15' | | Clarke 45' (pen.) | Stadium: Haig Avenue |

| 29 November 2019 | Fulham | 2–0 | Plymouth Argyle | New Malden |
| 19:00 | Hilton 57'; Abraham 67' | | | Stadium: Motspur Park |

| 2 December 2019 | Everton | 3–0 | Watford | Southport |
| 19:00 | Foulds 57'; Evans 53', 65' | | | Stadium: Haig Avenue |

| 17 January 2020 | Everton | 4–2 | Fulham | Southport |
| 19:00 | Asare 10' (o.g.); Adeniran 41', 51'; Mampala 90' | Report | Abraham 14'; Taylor-Crossdale 74' (pen.) | Stadium: Haig Avenue; Attendance: 69 |

| 20 January 2020 | Watford | 1–3 | Plymouth Argyle | St Albans |
| 19:00 | Bennetts 37' | | Lolos 15'; C. Grant 23'; J. Grant 75' | Stadium: Clarence Park |

| 7 February 2020 | Watford | 1–0 | Fulham | St Albans |
| 19:00 | Cassidy 50' | | | Stadium: Clarence Park |

| 10 February 2020 | Plymouth Argyle | 0–4 | Everton | Plymouth |
| 14:00 | | | Adeniran 23'; Simms 37', 63'; Astley 45+3' | Stadium: Home Park; Attendance: 89 |

| 21 February 2020 | Watford | 0–1 | Everton | St Albans |
| 19:00 | | | Simms 90' | Stadium: Clarence Park |

| 25 February 2020 | Plymouth Argyle | 1–4 | Fulham | Plymouth |
| 19:00 | Miller 66' | | Cooper 34' (o.g.); Stansfield 47'; O'Riley 68' (pen.); Harris 73' | Stadium: Home Park; Attendance: 116 |

=== Group C ===
| Team | Pld | W | D | L | GF | GA | GD | Pts |
|---|---|---|---|---|---|---|---|---|
| West Bromwich Albion | 6 | 4 | 0 | 2 | 8 | 4 | +4 | 12 |
| Newcastle United | 6 | 3 | 2 | 1 | 12 | 7 | +5 | 11 |
| Hull City | 6 | 2 | 2 | 2 | 7 | 6 | +1 | 8 |
| Scunthorpe United | 6 | 0 | 2 | 4 | 7 | 17 | −10 | 2 |

Updated to match(es) played on 21 February 2020. Source:

| 4 October 2019 | Scunthorpe United | 0–2 | West Bromwich Albion | Scunthorpe |
| 19:00 | | | Azaz 30'; Willock 70' | Stadium: Glanford Park; Attendance: 165 |

| 4 October 2019 | Hull City | 0–1 | Newcastle United | Kingston upon Hull |
| 19:00 | | | Charman 83' (pen.) | Stadium: University of Hull |

| 8 November 2019 | Newcastle United | 0–1 | West Bromwich Albion | Newcastle-upon-Tyne |
| 12:00 | | Report | Clayton-Phillips 41' | Stadium: Northumberland F.A. Attendance: 144 |

| 29 November 2019 | Scunthorpe United | 3–3 | Newcastle United | Scunthorpe |
| 19:00 | Miller 9', 82', 90+1' | | Anderson 21'; Allan 38', 48' | Stadium: Glanford Park; Attendance: 108 |

| 17 January 2020 | Newcastle United | 1–1 | Hull City | Newcastle-upon-Tyne |
| 13:00 | Allan 37' (pen.) | Report | Koy Lupano 66' | Stadium: Northumberland F.A. Attendance: 148 |

| 28 January 2020 | West Bromwich Albion | 2–1 | Hull City | Hednesford |
| 13:00 | Azaz 42'; Soule 90+1' | | Yates 50' | Stadium: Keys Park |

| 3 February 2020 | Scunthorpe United | 2–3 | Hull City | Scunthorpe |
| 19:00 | Green 24'; Miller 74' | Report | Balogh 59'; Chadwick 79'; Jones 87' | Stadium: Glanford Park; Attendance: 112 |

| 10 February 2020 | West Bromwich Albion | 0–1 | Newcastle United | West Bromwich |
| 14:00 | | Report | Allan 21' | Stadium: WBA Training Ground; Attendance: 48 |

| 13 February 2020 | West Bromwich Albion | 3–0 | Scunthorpe United | Hednesford |
| 14:00 | Diaby 27', 29', 68' | | | Stadium: Keys Park |

| 21 February 2020 | Newcastle United | 6–2 | Scunthorpe United | Newcastle-upon-Tyne |
| 13:00 | Allan 17', 20'; Anderson 42'; Young 61'; Toure 77'; McEntee 90+1' | | Hornshaw 45'; El-Mhanni 54' | Stadium: Northumberland F.A. Attendance: 201 |

| 21 February 2020 | Hull City | 2–0 | West Bromwich Albion | Kingston upon Hull |
| 19:20 | Kingsley 7'; Chadwick 34' | | | Stadium: University of Hull |

| 25 February 2020 | Hull City | 0–0 | Scunthorpe United | Kingston upon Hull |
| 19:00 | | Report | | Stadium: University of Hull |

=== Group D ===
| Team | Pld | W | D | L | GF | GA | GD | Pts |
|---|---|---|---|---|---|---|---|---|
| Exeter City | 6 | 4 | 2 | 0 | 14 | 5 | +9 | 14 |
| Doncaster Rovers | 6 | 4 | 1 | 1 | 12 | 5 | +7 | 13 |
| Aston Villa | 6 | 2 | 0 | 4 | 9 | 12 | −3 | 6 |
| Portsmouth | 6 | 0 | 1 | 5 | 5 | 18 | −13 | 1 |

Updated to match(es) played on 25 February 2020. Source:

| 24 September 2019 | Doncaster Rovers | 1–0 | Portsmouth | Doncaster |
| 20:00 | Wright | Report | | Stadium: Keepmoat Stadium |

| 3 October 2019 | Exeter City | 3–0 | Aston Villa | Exeter |
| 19:00 | Seymour 43'; Jay 48' (pen.); Dyer 72' | Report | | Stadium: St James Park; Attendance: 520 |

| 11 November 2019 | Aston Villa | 0–1 | Doncaster Rovers | Hednesford |
| 19:00 | | | Watters 68' | Stadium: Keys Park |

| 26 November 2019 | Exeter City | 1–0 | Doncaster Rovers | Exeter |
| 19:00 | Warren 88' | Report | | Stadium: St James Park; Attendance: 281 |

| 29 November 2019 | Aston Villa | 6–0 | Portsmouth | Bodymoor Heath |
| 19:00 | Ramsey 43', 90'; Archer 45'; Wright 54'; Brunt 59'; Sea 89' | | | Stadium: Bodymoor Heath Training Ground |

| 9 January 2020 | Portsmouth | 2–2 | Exeter City | Bognor Regis |
| 19:00 | Lethbridge 52'; Casey 66' | | Simpson 62'; Seymour 87' | Stadium: Nyewood Lane |

| 29 November 2019 | Aston Villa | 0–4 | Exeter City | Bodymoor Heath |
| 19:00 | | | Wilson 9', 61'; Dean 60'; Seymour 79' | Stadium: Bodymoor Heath Training Ground |

| 21 January 2020 | Portsmouth | 2–4 | Doncaster Rovers | Havant |
| 19:00 | Mnoga 64'; Maloney 76' | | Amos 10'; McLean 30'; Gibbons 40'; Trialist 54' | Stadium: West Leigh Park |

| 29 January 2020 | Doncaster Rovers | 4–0 | Aston Villa | Doncaster |
| 19:00 | Pereira 20'; Watters 28', 48'; Storer 61' | | | Stadium: Keepmoat Stadium |

| 4 February 2020 | Exeter City | 2–1 | Portsmouth | Exeter |
| 19:00 | Seymour 15'; Dyer 72' | Report | Whatmough 78' | Stadium: St James Park; Attendance: 297 |

| 24 February 2020 | Doncaster Rovers | 2–2 | Exeter City | Doncaster |
| 19:00 | Gibbons 45+1'; Watson 59' | | Hartridge 64'; Kite 65' | Stadium: Keepmoat Stadium |

| 25 February 2020 | Portsmouth | 0–3 | Aston Villa | Bognor Regis |
| 19:00 | | | Ramsey 52'; Wright 60'; Philogene 79' | Stadium: Nyewood Lane |

=== Group E ===
| Team | Pld | W | D | L | GF | GA | GD | Pts |
|---|---|---|---|---|---|---|---|---|
| AFC Bournemouth | 6 | 4 | 1 | 1 | 11 | 5 | +6 | 13 |
| Stoke City | 6 | 3 | 3 | 0 | 12 | 4 | +8 | 12 |
| Southampton | 6 | 1 | 1 | 4 | 8 | 13 | −5 | 4 |
| Nottingham Forest | 6 | 1 | 1 | 4 | 3 | 12 | −9 | 4 |

Updated to match(es) played on 28 February 2020. Source:

| 5 October 2019 | AFC Bournemouth | 1–0 | Nottingham Forest | Boscombe |
| 11:00 | Dobre 36' | | | Stadium: Dean Court |

| 5 October 2019 | Southampton | 1–1 | Stoke City | Marchwood |
| 15:00 | N'Lundulu 52' | Report | Dunwoody 63' | Stadium: Staplewood Campus; Attendance: 150 |

| 8 November 2019 | AFC Bournemouth | 2–2 | Stoke City | Boscombe |
| 19:00 | Dobre 29'; Anthony 79' (pen.) | | Jarvis 23' (pen.); McJannett 75' | Stadium: Dean Court |

| 9 November 2019 | Southampton | 3–1 | Nottingham Forest | Marchwood |
| 13:00 | Hansen 18'; Vokins 54'; Klarer 76' | Report | Mighten 26' | Stadium: Staplewood Campus; Attendance: 0 |

| 2 December 2019 | Stoke City | 4–0 | Nottingham Forest | Leek |
| 19:00 | Sankoh 4', 42'; Dunwoody 13'; Kyeremateng 71' | | | Stadium: Harrison Park |

| 2 December 2019 | Southampton | 0–2 | AFC Bournemouth | Marchwood |
| 19:00 | | Report | Dobre 23'; Scrimshaw 77' | Stadium: Staplewood Campus; Attendance: 0 |

| 17 January 2020 | Nottingham Forest | 0–3 | AFC Bournemouth | Alfreton |
| 19:00 | | | Taylor 16', 58'; Dobre 18' | Stadium: North Street; Attendance: 104 |

| 7 February 2020 | Nottingham Forest | 2–1 | Southampton | Alfreton |
| 19:00 | Gomis 16'; Clough 51' | Report | Hansen 71' | Stadium: North Street; Attendance: 104 |

| 21 February 2020 | Nottingham Forest | 0–0 | Stoke City | Nottingham |
| 19:00 | | | | Stadium: Nigel Doughty Academy |

| 21 February 2020 | AFC Bournemouth | 3–2 | Southampton | Boscombe |
| 19:00 | Zemura 60'; Ibe 85'; Surridge 90+2' | Report | Hansen 38'; Kpohomough 74' | Stadium: Dean Court; Attendance: 3,700 |

| 25 February 2020 | Stoke City | 4–1 | Southampton | Leek |
| 14:00 | Kyeremateng 5', 18' (pen.), 74'; Godfrinne 74' | Report | Maddox 57' | Stadium: Harrison Park; Attendance: 0 |

| 28 February 2020 | Stoke City | 1–0 | AFC Bournemouth | Stoke-on-Trent |
| 13:00 | Godfrinne 53' | | | Stadium: Clayton Wood Training Ground; Attendance: BCD |

=== Group F ===
| Team | Pld | W | D | L | GF | GA | GD | Pts |
|---|---|---|---|---|---|---|---|---|
| Liverpool | 6 | 4 | 1 | 1 | 15 | 7 | +8 | 13 |
| Wigan Athletic | 6 | 3 | 1 | 2 | 12 | 10 | +2 | 10 |
| Huddersfield Town | 6 | 1 | 3 | 2 | 7 | 8 | −1 | 6 |
| Sunderland | 6 | 1 | 1 | 4 | 5 | 14 | −9 | 4 |

Updated to match(es) played on 9 March 2020. Source:

| 6 October 2019 | Liverpool | 3–2 | Wigan Athletic | Kirkby |
| 15:00 | Dixon-Bonner 8', 15'; Hill 33' | | Gelhardt 23', 58' | Stadium: Liverpool Academy |

| 7 October 2019 | Huddersfield Town | 0–0 | Sunderland | Huddersfield |
| 19:00 | | | | Stadium: John Smiths' Stadium |

| 10 November 2019 | Sunderland | 1–2 | Liverpool | Hetton-le-Hole |
| 12:00 | Mbunga-Kimpioka 46' | | Collins 67' (o.g.); Brewster 83' (pen.) | Stadium: Eppleton Colliery Welfare Ground |

| 11 November 2019 | Wigan Athletic | 1–1 | Huddersfield Town | Leyland |
| 19:00 | Crankshaw 14' | | Obiero 16' | Stadium: Leyland County Ground |

| 2 December 2019 | Huddersfield Town | 1–1 | Liverpool | Huddersfield |
| 19:00 | Diakhaby 22' | | Kane 11' | Stadium: John Smiths' Stadium |

| 17 January 2020 | Wigan Athletic | 3–0 | Liverpool | Leyland |
| 19:00 | Obi 9'; Baningime 32'; Crankshaw 77' | | | Stadium: Leyland County Ground |

| 20 January 2020 | Sunderland | 2–1 | Huddersfield Town | Hetton-le-Hole |
| 19:00 | Sammutt 49'; Kiernan 88' | | Obiero 6' | Stadium: Eppleton Colliery Welfare Ground |

| 20 January 2020 | Sunderland | 2–3 | Wigan Athletic | Hetton-le-Hole |
| 19:00 | Kranthove 35'; Hackett 41' (pen.) | | Joseph 5'; Jolley 25' (pen.); Perry 51' | Stadium: Eppleton Colliery Welfare Ground |

| 21 February 2020 | Liverpool | 3–0 | Huddersfield Town | Kirkby |
| 19:00 | Millar 15'; van den Berg 32'; Hardy 90+4' | | | Stadium: Liverpool Academy |

| 24 February 2020 | Liverpool | 6–0 | Sunderland | Kirkby |
| 14:15 | Millar 12'; Hardy 60', 70'; Jones 85', 90+3', 90+4' | Report | | Stadium: Liverpool Academy; Attendance: 100 |

| 6 March 2020 | Huddersfield Town | 4–1 | Wigan Athletic | Huddersfield |
| 13:00 | Daley 39'; Headley 67'; Pyke 74'; McCamley 88' | | Jolley 5' | Stadium: Canalside Training Ground |

| 9 March 2020 | Wigan Athletic | 2–0 | Sunderland | Wigan |
| 14:00 | Jolley 55' (pen.); Baningime 65' | | | Stadium: Christopher Park |

=== Group G ===
| Team | Pld | W | D | L | GF | GA | GD | Pts |
|---|---|---|---|---|---|---|---|---|
| Blackburn Rovers | 6 | 4 | 1 | 1 | 12 | 8 | +4 | 13 |
| Middlesbrough | 6 | 3 | 2 | 1 | 14 | 8 | +6 | 11 |
| Burnley | 6 | 1 | 3 | 2 | 7 | 8 | −1 | 6 |
| Crystal Palace | 6 | 0 | 2 | 4 | 5 | 14 | −9 | 2 |

Updated to match(es) played on 12 March 2020. Source:

| 6 October 2019 | Middlesbrough | 1–1 | Burnley | Bishop Auckland |
| 13:00 | Liddle 87' (pen.) | | Wilson 11' | Stadium: Heritage Park |

| 17 October 2019 | Crystal Palace | 1–3 | Blackburn Rovers | East Dulwich |
| 13:00 | Street 22' | | Chapman 44'; Costello 80', 88' | Stadium: Champion Hill |

| 7 November 2019 | Burnley | 2–2 | Crystal Palace | Bamber Bridge |
| 13:00 | Koiki 67'; Legzdins 90+5' | | Dreher 19'; Aveiro 20' | Stadium: Sir Tom Finney Stadium |

| 8 November 2019 | Blackburn Rovers | 3–1 | Middlesbrough | Leyland |
| 19:00 | Butterworth 76'; Rankin-Costello 84'; Vale 89' | | Gibson 12' | Stadium: Leyland County Ground |

| 29 November 2019 | Blackburn Rovers | 2–1 | Burnley | Blackburn |
| 13:00 | Samuel 31'; Davenport 53' | | Harker 70' | Stadium: Ewood Park |

| 2 December 2019 | Crystal Palace | 1–5 | Middlesbrough | East Dulwich |
| 14:00 | Street 30' | | Wearne 2'; Walker 5', 9'; Jones 28'; Liddle 43' | Stadium: Champion Hill |

| 20 January 2020 | Burnley | 1–2 | Middlesbrough | Curzon Ashton |
| 13:00 | Koiki 86' (pen.) | | O'Neill 45', 52' | Stadium: Tameside Stadium |

| 25 January 2020 | Blackburn Rovers | 2–0 | Crystal Palace | Blackburn |
| 13:00 | Vale 45'; Brennan 69' | | | Stadium: Brockhall Village |

| 6 February 2020 | Crystal Palace | 0–1 | Burnley | East Dulwich |
| 14:00 | | | George 82' | Stadium: Champion Hill |

| 7 February 2020 | Middlesbrough | 4–1 | Blackburn Rovers | Bishop Auckland |
| 19:00 | Folarin 14', 51'; O'Neill 22' (pen.), 69' | | Mols 9' (pen.) | Stadium: Heritage Park |

| 21 February 2020 | Middlesbrough | 1–1 | Crystal Palace | Bishop Auckland |
| 19:00 | Burrell 45' | | Kirby 27' | Stadium: Heritage Park |

| 12 March 2020 | Burnley | 1–1 | Blackburn Rovers | Curzon Ashton |
| 14:00 | Mumbongo 65' | | Pike 6' | Stadium: Tameside Stadium |

=== Group H ===
| Team | Pld | W | D | L | GF | GA | GD | Pts |
|---|---|---|---|---|---|---|---|---|
| Derby County | 6 | 4 | 0 | 2 | 18 | 7 | +11 | 12 |
| Wolverhampton Wanderers | 6 | 2 | 3 | 1 | 10 | 10 | 0 | 9 |
| Birmingham City | 6 | 2 | 2 | 2 | 7 | 9 | −2 | 8 |
| Leeds United | 6 | 0 | 3 | 3 | 5 | 14 | −9 | 3 |

Updated to match(es) played on 25 February 2020. Source:

| 4 October 2019 | Leeds United | 0–0 | Birmingham City | Tadcaster |
| 19:30 | | | | Stadium: 2inspire Park |

| 7 October 2019 | Derby County | 1–2 | Wolverhampton Wanderers | Derby |
| 19:00 | Bennett 56' | | Ashley-Seal 11', 39' | Stadium: Pride Park Stadium |

| 9 November 2019 | Wolverhampton Wanderers | 2–1 | Birmingham City | Compton |
| 13:00 | Ashley-Seal 17', 44' | | Grounds 68' | Stadium: Sir Jack Hayward Training Ground |

| 13 November 2019 | Derby County | 7–1 | Leeds United | Loughborough |
| 19:00 | Sibley 11', 17', 69' (pen.); Bennett 22'; Hector-Ingram 29', 79'; Bird 60' | | Galloway 90+3' | Stadium: Loughborough University Stadium; Attendance: 400 |

| 2 December 2019 | Derby County | 5–1 | Birmingham City | Loughborough |
| 19:00 | Shonibare 28'; Hector-Ingram 30' (pen.), 43'; Brown 69'; Mitchell-Lawson 90+7' | | Seddon 51' | Stadium: Loughborough University Stadium; Attendance: 201 |

| 17 January 2020 | Birmingham City | 2–0 | Leeds United | Loughborough |
| 14:00 | Reid 45'; Boyd-Munce 46' | | | Stadium: Loughborough University Stadium; Attendance: 96 |

| 24 January 2020 | Wolverhampton Wanderers | 2–2 | Leeds United | Compton |
| 14:00 | Ashley-Seal 41'; Cundle 65' | Report | McKinstry 20'; McKinstry 36' | Stadium: Sir Jack Hayward Training Ground |

| 6 February 2020 | Birmingham City | 2–2 | Wolverhampton Wanderers | Loughborough |
| 14:00 | Reid 45', 49' | | Perry 45+2'; Dadashov 75' | Stadium: Loughborough University Stadium; Attendance: 94 |

| 7 February 2020 | Leeds United | 1–2 | Derby County | York |
| 19:00 | Hudson 42' | Report | Hector-Ingram 18' (pen.); Hepburn-Murphy 32' | Stadium: Bootham Crescent; Attendance: 886 |

| 21 February 2020 | Birmingham City | 1–0 | Derby County | Loughborough |
| 14:00 | Reid 24' | | | Stadium: Loughborough University Stadium; Attendance: 226 |

| 21 February 2020 | Leeds United | 1–1 | Wolverhampton Wanderers | York |
| 14:00 | Kamwa 27' | | Campbell 76' | Stadium: Bootham Crescent; Attendance: 475 |

| 25 February 2020 | Wolverhampton Wanderers | 1–3 | Derby County | Compton |
| 14:00 | Perry 34' | | Hector-Ingram 59' (pen.); Shonibare 68'; Sibley 81' | Stadium: Sir Jack Hayward Training Ground |

== Knockout stages ==
=== Round of 16 ===
| 6 March 2020 | West Bromwich Albion | 6–1 | Doncaster Rovers | Hednesford |
| 19:00 | Dyce 6'; Blythe 16' (o.g.); Tulloch 51', 75'; Diaby 86'; Sharpe 88' | | Okenabirhie 47' (pen.) | Stadium: Keys Park |

| 7 March 2020 | Derby County | 6–0 | Middlesbrough | Burton upon Trent |
| 12:30 | Hepburn-Murphy 37', 44'; Wilson 68'; Hector-Ingram 83', 86'; Cresswell 90' | | | Stadium: St George's Park National Football Centre |

| 8 March 2020 | Everton | 2–1 | Reading | Southport |
| 14:00 | Simms 6'; Adeniran 11' | | McGiff 87' | Stadium: Haig Avenue |

| 9 March 2020 | Charlton Athletic | 1–2 (a.e.t.) | Fulham | Charlton |
| 14:00 | Davison 28' | | Taylor-Crossdale 90+1'; O'Riley 118' | Stadium: The Valley; Attendance: 150 |

| 9 March 2020 | Blackburn Rovers | C–C | Wolverhampton Wanderers | Leyland |
| 19:00 | | | | Stadium: Leyland County Ground |

| 19 March 2020 | Exeter City | C–C | Newcastle United | Exeter |
| 19:00 | | | | Stadium: St James Park |

| 21 March 2020 | Liverpool | C–C | Stoke City | Kirkby |
| 13:00 | | | | Stadium: Liverpool Academy |

== See also ==
- 2019–20 Professional U23 Development League
- 2019–20 FA Youth Cup
