= 2018–19 Exeter City F.C. season =

Exeter City
2018–19 season
- Owner: Exeter City Supporters' Trust
- Chairman: Julian Tagg
- Manager: Matt Taylor
- Stadium: St James Park
- League Two: 9th
- FA Cup: First round
- EFL Cup: Second round
- EFL Trophy: Second round
- Top goalscorer: League: Jayden Stockley (16); All: Jayden Stockley (16)
- Highest home attendance: 5,967 (vs. Yeovil Town)
- Lowest home attendance: 746 (vs. Peterborough United)
- Average home league attendance: 4,343
Home colours	Away colours	Third colours

The 2018–19 season was Exeter City's 117th year in existence and their seventh consecutive season in League Two. The club also participated in three cup competitions; the FA Cup, EFL Cup, and EFL Trophy.

The season covers the period from 1 July 2018 to 30 June 2019.

== Transfers ==
=== Transfers in ===
Date from	Position	Name	From	Fee	Ref.
1 July 2018	FW	(Barbados) Jonathan Forte	Notts County	Free transfer	
1 July 2018	DF	(England) Aaron Martin	Oxford United	Free transfer	
1 July 2018	GK	(England) Chris Weale	Dorchester Town	Free transfer	
2 July 2018	MF	(England) Nicky Law	Free agent (Note: Previous club: Bradford City)	Free transfer	
24 July 2018	MF	(England) Lee Martin	Free agent (Note: Previous club: Gillingham)	Free transfer	
24 July 2018	DF	(Australia) Jimmy Oates	Hereford	Free transfer	
2 January 2019	FW	(England) Ryan Bowman	(Scotland) Motherwell	Undisclosed	
18 January 2019	MF	(England) Randell Williams	Watford	Free transfer	

=== Transfers out ===
Date from	Position	Name	To	Fee	Ref.
1 July 2018	DF	(England) Troy Archibald-Henville	Released		
1 July 2018	FW	(England) Ryan Brunt	Released (Note: Joined Bath City on 1 July 2018)		
1 July 2018	MF	(England) Alex Byrne	Released (Note: Joined Weston-super-Mare on 3 August 2018)		
1 July 2018	FW	(Republic of Ireland) Liam McAlinden	Released (Note: Joined Cheltenham Town on 28 July 2018)		
1 July 2018	DF	(England) Danny Seaborne	Released (Note: Joined Derry City on 2 July 2018)		
1 July 2018	FW	(England) Robbie Simpson	Released (Note: Joined Milton Keynes Dons on 9 July 2018)		
1 July 2018	GK	(England) Lewis Williams	Released		
1 July 2018	DF	(England) Jordan Moore-Taylor	Milton Keynes Dons	Free transfer	
1 July 2018	DF	(England) Jordan Storey	Preston North End	Undisclosed (Note: Reported fee: £750,000)	
4 July 2018	MF	(Wales) Lloyd James	Forest Green Rovers	Undisclosed	
9 July 2018	MF	(England) Ryan Harley	Milton Keynes Dons	Free transfer	
3 January 2019	FW	(England) Jayden Stockley	Preston North End	Undisclosed (Note: Reported fee: £750,000)	

=== Loans in ===
Start date	Position	Name	From	End date	Ref.
3 July 2018	FW	(England) Tristan Abrahams	Norwich City	31 January 2019	
7 August 2018	DF	(Republic of Ireland) Dara O'Shea	West Bromwich Albion	End of season	
31 August 2018	MF	(Republic of Ireland) Chiedozie Ogbene	Brentford	2 January 2019	
14 January 2019	DF	(England) Kane Wilson	West Bromwich Albion	End of season	
18 January 2019	DF	(England) Jaden Brown	Huddersfield Town	25 March 2019	
31 January 2019	FW	(England) Donovan Wilson	Wolverhampton Wanderers	End of season	

=== Loans out ===
Start date	Position	Name	To	End date	Ref.
16 July 2018	DF	(England) Alex Hartridge	Truro City	27 September 2018	
16 July 2018	MF	(Wales) Max Smallcombe	Truro City	26 October 2018	
23 July 2018	MF	(England) Joshua Key	Tiverton Town	End of season	
23 July 2018	MF	(England) Joel Randall	Tiverton Town	January 2019	
25 July 2018	MF	(England) Harry Kite	Dorchester Town	End of season	
27 July 2018	FW	(England) Ben Seymour	Gloucester City	26 October 2018	
26 October 2018	FW	(England) Ben Seymour	Dorchester Town	End of season	
26 October 2018	MF	(Wales) Max Smallcombe	Tiverton Town	End of season	
26 October 2018	MF	(England) Jack Sparkes	Chippenham Town	19 December 2018	
19 December 2018	MF	(England) Jack Sparkes	Salisbury	End of season	
24 January 2019	DF	(Australia) Jimmy Oates	Hereford	End of season	
25 January 2019	DF	(England) Jordan Dyer	Tiverton Town	25 February 2019	
29 January 2019	MF	(England) Jordan Tillson	Cheltenham Town	End of season	

== Pre-season ==
Exeter City played six pre-season friendlies in July 2018 – all away from home at teams based in South West England – winning five and drawing one. There were no pre-season friendlies at St James Park due to redevelopment work taking place over the summer.

=== Friendlies ===
10 July 2018 Friendly	Bideford AFC	1–3	Exeter City	Bideford
19:00 BST	Mayne 36'	Report	Seymour 33' (pen.); Key 78', 85'	Stadium: The Sports Ground

12 July 2018 Friendly	Truro City	0–6	Exeter City	Truro
19:00 BST		Report	Boateng 28'; Sparkes 34'; Jay 42'; Forte 49', 68'; Stockley 58'	Stadium: Treyew Road

17 July 2018 Friendly	Bath City	0–1	Exeter City	Twerton, Bath
19:00 BST		Report	Jay 47'	Stadium: Twerton Park

19 July 2018 Friendly	Weymouth	0–2	Exeter City	Weymouth
19:00 BST		Report	Abrahams 9'; Jay 87'	Stadium: Bob Lucas Stadium

27 July 2018 Friendly	Taunton Town	2–2	Exeter City	Taunton
19:30 BST	Sullivan 63'; Neal 75'	Report	Randall 25'; Jay 60'	Stadium: Viridor Stadium; Attendance: 901

28 July 2018 Friendly	Bristol Rovers	0–4	Exeter City	Horfield, Bristol
15:00 BST		Report	Forte 28'; Moxey 31'; Boateng 38'; Brown 61'	Stadium: Memorial Stadium; Attendance: 1,796; Referee: Simon Hooper

== Competitions ==
=== League Two ===
==== League table ====
Pos	Team	Pld	W	D	L	GF	GA	GD	Pts	Promotion, qualification or relegation
7	Newport County	46	20	11	15	59	59	0	71	Qualification for League Two play-offs (Note: Four teams play for one spot and promotion to EFL League One.)
8	Colchester United	46	20	10	16	65	53	+12	70	
9	Exeter City	46	19	13	14	60	49	+11	70	
10	Stevenage	46	20	10	16	59	55	+4	70	
11	Carlisle United	46	20	8	18	67	62	+5	68	

Source: EFL Official Website
Rules for classification: 1) Points; 2) Goal difference; 3) Number of goals scored; 4) Head-to-head results

==== Results summary ====
Overall								Home						Away					
Pld	W	D	L	GF	GA	GD	Pts	W	D	L	GF	GA	GD	W	D	L	GF	GA	GD
46	19	13	14	60	49	+11	70	12	3	8	34	25	+9	7	10	6	26	24	+2

Last updated: 4 May 2019.
Source: BBC

==== Results by matchday ====
Matchday	1	2	3	4	5	6	7	8	9	10	11	12	13	14	15	16	17	18	19	20	21	22	23	24	25	26	27	28	29	30	31	32	33	34	35	36	37	38	39	40	41	42	43	44	45	46
Ground	H	A	H	A	A	H	H	A	H	A	H	A	H	A	A	H	A	H	A	H	A	H	A	H	H	A	A	H	A	H	H	A	H	A	H	A	A	A	H	A	H	H	A	H	A	H
Result	W	W	D	W	L	L	W	W	W	D	W	D	W	D	D	L	L	D	D	L	L	W	W	W	L	W	D	L	W	W	D	L	W	D	L	L	W	W	L	D	L	W	L	D	W	D
Position	5	1	1	1	3	9	3	2	2	3	2	2	2	2	3	3	5	6	6	7	9	7	6	5	7	6	8	8	7	7	7	8	7	5	5	8	7	7	7	7	7	7	7	7	7	9

Updated to match(es) played on 4 May 2019. Source: Statto.com
A = Away; H = Home; W = Win; D = Draw; L = Loss

==== Matches ====
On 21 June 2018, the League Two fixtures for the forthcoming season were announced.

4 August 2018 1	Exeter City	3–1	Carlisle United	Exeter
15:00 BST	Law 16'; Forte 26'; Abrahams 90+3'	Report	Bennett 37'	Stadium: St James Park; Attendance: 4,266; Referee: Graham Salisbury

11 August 2018 2	Morecambe	0–2	Exeter City	Morecambe
15:00 BST		Report	Sweeney 43' (pen.); Stockley 66'	Stadium: Globe Arena; Attendance: 1,654; Referee: Thomas Bramall

18 August 2018 3	Exeter City	1–1	Newport County	Exeter
15:00 BST	Stockley 21'	Report	Harris 81'	Stadium: St James Park; Attendance: 4,239; Referee: Chris Sarginson

21 August 2018 4	Cambridge United	0–2	Exeter City	Cambridge
19:45 BST		Report	Forte 8'; Stockley 14'	Stadium: Abbey Stadium; Attendance: 3,362; Referee: Craig Hicks

25 August 2018 5	Milton Keynes Dons	1–0	Exeter City	Milton Keynes
15:00 BST	Agard 65' (pen.)	Report		Stadium: Stadium MK; Attendance: 7,672; Referee: Charles Breakspear

1 September 2018 6	Exeter City	0–3	Lincoln City	Exeter
15:00 BST		Report	Frecklington 43'; Akinde 45'; Brown 56' (o.g.)	Stadium: St James Park; Attendance: 4,067; Referee: Kevin Johnson

8 September 2018 7	Exeter City	5–1	Notts County	Exeter
15:00 BST	Sweeney 16', 58' (pen.); Stockley 18', 74'; Martin 90+1'	Report	Boldewijn 43'	Stadium: St James Park; Attendance: 3,916; Referee: Neil Hair

15 September 2018 8	Mansfield Town	1–2	Exeter City	Mansfield
15:00 BST	Walker 61'	Report	Moxey 31'; Law 57'	Stadium: Field Mill; Attendance: 4,443; Referee: Andy Haines

22 September 2018 9	Exeter City	3–1	Cheltenham Town	Exeter
15:00 BST	Sweeney 46'; Stockley 80'; Forte 88'	Report	Broom 42'	Stadium: St James Park; Attendance: 3,723; Referee: Graham Salisbury

29 September 2018 10	Port Vale	1–1	Exeter City	Burslem
15:00 BST	Kanu 90+7'	Report	Law 48'	Stadium: Vale Park; Attendance: 4,615; Referee: Seb Stockbridge

2 October 2018 11	Exeter City	1–0	Stevenage	Exeter
19:45 BST	Moxey 45+6'	Report	Wildin (red card) 83'	Stadium: St James Park; Attendance: 3,671; Referee: Antony Coggins

6 October 2018 12	Yeovil Town	2–2	Exeter City	Yeovil
15:00 BST	Green 48'; Fisher 61'; D'Almeida (yellow card) 90'; Pattison (yellow card) 90'	Report	Stockley 9', 75'	Stadium: Huish Park; Attendance: 4,223; Referee: Ollie Yates

13 October 2018 13	Exeter City	2–0	Swindon Town	Exeter
15:00 BST	Forte 14'; Boateng (yellow card) 59'; Stockley 63'	Report		Stadium: St James Park; Attendance: 4,506; Referee: Peter Wright

20 October 2018 14	Grimsby Town	0–0	Exeter City	Cleethorpes
15:00 BST		Report		Stadium: Blundell Park; Attendance: 4,038; Referee: Matt Donohue

23 October 2018 15	Crawley Town	1–1	Exeter City	Crawley
19:45 BST	Morais 61'	Report	Holmes 79'	Stadium: Broadfield Stadium; Attendance: 2,095; Referee: John Busby

27 October 2018 16	Exeter City	1–2	Forest Green Rovers	Exeter
15:00 BST	Tillson (yellow card) 26'; Martin 90+4'	Report	Campbell (yellow card) 31'; James (yellow card) 46'; Brown 50'; Shephard 72'; Archibald (yellow card) 90'	Stadium: St James Park; Attendance: 4,983; Referee: Dean Whitestone

3 November 2018 17	Tranmere Rovers	2–0	Exeter City	Birkenhead
15:00 GMT	Norwood 31', 55'	Report	L. Martin (yellow card) 45'; Moxey (yellow card) 56' (yellow-red card) 73'	Stadium: Prenton Park; Attendance: 6,209; Referee: Thomas Bramall

17 November 2018 18	Exeter City	2–2	Northampton Town	Exeter
15:00 GMT	Taylor 14'; Stockley 43'	Report	Waters 26'; Williams 90'	Stadium: St James Park; Attendance: 4,332; Referee: Peter Wright

24 November 2018 19	Colchester United	1–1	Exeter City	Colchester
15:00 GMT	Szmodics 67'	Report	Stockley 70'	Stadium: Colchester Community Stadium; Attendance: 3,384; Referee: Ben Toner

27 November 2018 20	Exeter City	0–1	Macclesfield Town	Exeter
19:45 GMT		Report	Smith 54'	Stadium: St James Park; Attendance: 3,070; Referee: Brett Huxtable

8 December 2018 21	Bury	2–0	Exeter City	Bury
15:00 GMT	O'Shea 39'; Moore 76'	Report		Stadium: Gigg Lane; Attendance: 3,328; Referee: Ross Joyce

15 December 2018 22	Exeter City	1–0	Crewe Alexandra	Exeter
15:00 GMT	Martin 42'; Taylor (yellow card) 90+2'	Report	Jones (yellow card) 11'; Ray (yellow card) 71'; Dale (yellow card) 90'	Stadium: St James Park; Attendance: 3,505; Referee: Craig Hicks

22 December 2018 23	Oldham Athletic	2–3	Exeter City	Oldham
15:00 GMT	Surridge 12'; Lang 47'; Donald (yellow card) 90+2'	Report	Taylor (yellow card) 11'; Stockley 38', 64', 70'	Stadium: Boundary Park; Attendance: 4,079; Referee: Martin Coy

26 December 2018 24	Exeter City	2–1	Yeovil Town	Exeter
13:00 GMT	Holmes 34'; Stockley 88'	Report	Green (yellow card) 23'; Browne (yellow card) 50'; James 53'	Stadium: St James Park; Attendance: 5,974; Referee: Graham Salisbury

29 December 2018 25	Exeter City	1–2	Grimsby Town	Exeter
15:00 GMT	Stockley 78'	Report	Woolford (yellow card) 9' (goal) 14'; Whitmore (red card) 51'; Hendrie (yellow card) 73'; Rose 80' (pen.)	Stadium: St James Park; Attendance: 4,956; Referee: Chris Sarginson

1 January 2019 26	Swindon Town	0–2	Exeter City	Swindon
15:00 GMT		Report	Forte 37' (pen.); Martin (yellow card) 57'; Collins 69'; Ogbene (yellow card) 89'	Stadium: County Ground; Attendance: 6,755; Referee: Nick Kinseley

12 January 2019 27	Exeter City	0–0	Morecambe	Exeter
15:00 GMT	Moxey (yellow card) 53'; Law (yellow card) 68'	Report	Ellison (yellow card) 90+2'	Stadium: St James Park; Attendance: 4,113; Referee: Brett Huxtable

19 January 2019 28	Newport County	1–0	Exeter City	Newport
15:00 GMT	Matt 71'	Report		Stadium: Rodney Parade; Attendance: 3,791; Referee: Charles Breakspear

26 January 2019 29	Exeter City	1–0	Cambridge United	Exeter
15:00 GMT	O'Shea (yellow card) 62'; Forte (penalty missed) 66'; Wilson (yellow card) 75'; Law 82'	Report		Stadium: St James Park; Attendance: 3,996; Referee: Graham Salisbury

2 February 2019 30	Exeter City	3–1	Milton Keynes Dons	Exeter
15:00 GMT	Sweeney (yellow card) 6'; Law 7', 72'; Taylor 17'	Report	Walsh 48'; Cargill (yellow card) 58'; Houghton (yellow card) 73'; Gilbey (yellow card) 90+5'	Stadium: St James Park; Attendance: 5,766; Referee: Steve Martin

9 February 2019 31	Carlisle United	1–1	Exeter City	Carlisle
15:00 GMT	Parkes (yellow card) 18'; Devitt (yellow card) 22' (goal) 78'	Report	Law 19'	Stadium: Brunton Park; Attendance: 4,851; Referee: Matt Donohue

16 February 2019 32	Exeter City	0–1	Bury	Exeter
15:00 GMT	Taylor (yellow card) 45'; Moxey (yellow card) 90'	Report	Wharton (yellow card) 26'; Maynard 66'; Murphy (yellow card) 89'; Adams (yellow card) 90+3'	Stadium: St James Park; Attendance: 4,607; Referee: Oliver Yates

23 February 2019 33	Crewe Alexandra	1–2	Exeter City	Crewe
15:00 GMT	Porter 48'	Report	Taylor 7'; Jay 66'; Holmes (yellow card) 79'	Stadium: Gresty Road; Attendance: 3,841; Referee: Dean Whitestone

26 February 2019 34	Lincoln City	1–1	Exeter City	Lincoln
19:45 GMT	Bostwick (yellow card) 52'; Bolger (yellow card) 87'; Rhead (yellow card) 90'; Akinde 90+6'	Report	Jay 22'; Pym (yellow card) 90+2'	Stadium: Sincil Bank; Attendance: 8,589; Referee: John Brooks

2 March 2019 35	Exeter City	0–1	Tranmere Rovers	Exeter
15:00 GMT		Report	Norwood 31'; Perkins (yellow card) 45+1'; Bakayogo (yellow card) 56'; McCullough (yellow card) 66'	Stadium: St James Park; Attendance: 4,855; Referee: John Busby

9 March 2019 36	Northampton Town	2–1	Exeter City	Northampton
14:00 GMT	Pierre 32'; Williams 56'; Taylor (yellow card) 60'; Foley (yellow card) 90+5'	Report	Martin 61'	Stadium: Sixfields Stadium; Attendance: 4,954; Referee: Andy Haines

12 March 2019 P	Macclesfield Town	P–P	Exeter City	Macclesfield
19:45 GMT		Report		Stadium: Moss Rose
Note: The fixture was postponed due to a waterlogged pitch.

16 March 2019 37	Exeter City	3–0	Colchester United	Exeter
15:00 GMT	Jay 45'; Woodman (yellow card) 53'; Holmes 66'; Law 76'	Report		Stadium: St James Park; Attendance: 3,951; Referee: Scott Oldham

23 March 2019 38	Notts County	0–1	Exeter City	Nottingham
15:00 GMT	Milsom (yellow card) 72'	Report	Bowman (yellow card) 17' (yellow-red card) 23'; Moxey (yellow card) 19'; Law 90+3'	Stadium: Meadow Lane; Attendance: 9,505; Referee: Carl Boyeson

30 March 2019 39	Exeter City	1–4	Mansfield Town	Exeter
15:00 GMT	Jay 21' (yellow card) 82'; Taylor (yellow card) 45+2'; Wilson (yellow card) 70'; Woodman (yellow card) 74'	Report	Hamilton 20', 33'; Walker 57', 74' (pen.)	Stadium: St James Park; Attendance: 5,017; Referee: Ben Toner

6 April 2019 40	Cheltenham Town	1–1	Exeter City	Cheltenham
15:00 BST	Thomas 60' (pen.); Tozer (yellow card) 65'	Report	Moxey 36'; Taylor (yellow card) 47'; Pym (yellow card) 54' (yellow-red card) 90+10'; Boateng (yellow card) 90+7'	Stadium: Whaddon Road; Attendance: 4,079; Referee: Brett Huxtable

9 April 2019 41	Macclesfield Town	3–2	Exeter City	Macclesfield
19:45 BST	Smith 30', 85'; Rose 45+4' (pen.); Cole (yellow card) 45+5'; Durrell (yellow card) 90+6'	Report	Bowman 27', 34'; Brown (yellow card) 45+5'; Moxey (yellow card) 90+4'	Stadium: Moss Rose; Attendance: 1,588; Referee: Sebastian Stockbridge

13 April 2019 42	Exeter City	2–0	Port Vale	Exeter
15:00 BST	Law 2' (pen.); Collins (yellow card) 33'; Woodman (yellow card) 34'; Boateng 55'; Brown (yellow card) 68'	Report	Hannant (yellow card) 22'; Montaño (yellow card) 90'	Stadium: St James Park; Attendance: 4,013; Referee: Tom Nield

19 April 2019 43	Exeter City	1–3	Crawley Town	Exeter
13:00 BST	Bowman 50'; Sweeney (yellow card) 80'	Report	Morais 26'; Grego-Cox 34', 60'; Sesay (yellow card) 38'; Bulman (yellow card) 59'; McNerney (yellow card) 73'; Maguire (yellow card) 80'	Stadium: St James Park; Attendance: 5,054; Referee: Thomas Bramall

22 April 2019 44	Stevenage	1–1	Exeter City	Stevenage
15:00 BST	Guthrie 28'; Farman (yellow card) 88'	Report	Moxey (yellow card) 36'; Bowman 40' (yellow card) 90+5'	Stadium: Broadhall Way; Attendance: 3,195; Referee: Oliver Yates

27 April 2019 45	Exeter City	1–0	Oldham Athletic	Exeter
15:00 BST	Williams (yellow card) 13'; Taylor (yellow card) 61'; Bowman 79'; Sweeney (yellow card) 89'	Report	Iacovitti (yellow card) 45+1'; Edmundson (yellow card) 85'	Stadium: St James Park; Attendance: 5,040; Referee: Christopher Sarginson

4 May 2019 46	Forest Green Rovers	0–0	Exeter City	Nailsworth
12:30 BST	Gunning (yellow card) 39'	Report	Martin (yellow card) 39'; Collins (yellow card) 56'; Woodman (yellow card) 61'; Sweeney (yellow card) 67'	Stadium: The New Lawn; Attendance: 4,537; Referee: Ben Toner

=== FA Cup ===
The first round draw was made live on BBC by Dennis Wise and Dion Dublin on 22 October.

10 November 2018 First round	Exeter City	2–3	Blackpool	Exeter
15:00 GMT	Tillson 69'; Abrahams 90'	Report	Dodoo 3'; Cullen 19'; Pritchard 24'	Stadium: St James Park; Attendance: 3,188; Referee: Alan Yound

=== EFL Cup ===
On 15 June 2018, the draw for the first round was made in Ho Chi Minh City, Vietnam. The second round draw was made from the Stadium of Light on 16 August.

14 August 2018 First round	Exeter City	1–1 (4–2 p)	Ipswich Town	Exeter
19:45 BST	Brown 64'	Report	Jackson 37'	Stadium: St James Park; Attendance: 3,675; Referee: Brett Huxtable
	Penalties
	Taylor (penalty missed); Sweeney (penalty scored); Abrahams (penalty scored); Collins (penalty scored); L. Martin (penalty scored)		Bishop (penalty missed); Chambers (penalty scored); Jackson (penalty scored); Chalobah (penalty missed)

28 August 2018 Second round	Fulham	2–0	Exeter City	Fulham
19:45 BST	Kamara 4', 48'	Report		Stadium: Craven Cottage; Attendance: 9,333; Referee: Kevin Friend

=== EFL Trophy ===
On 18 July 2018, the final groups for the first round of the 2018–19 EFL Trophy were confirmed, with Exeter being placed in Southern Section Group D. The draw for the second round was made live on Talksport by Leon Britton and Steve Claridge on 16 November.

4 September 2018 Group stage	Yeovil Town	0–0 (3–4 p)	Exeter City	Yeovil
19:45 BST		Report		Stadium: Huish Park; Attendance: 1,518; Referee: Trevor Kettle
	Penalties
	Jaiyesimi (penalty scored); Olomola (penalty scored); Dickinson (penalty scored); Pattison (penalty missed); Patrick (penalty missed)		(penalty scored) Jay; (penalty scored) Collins; (penalty missed) Ogbene; (penalty scored) Abrahams; (penalty scored) Sparkes

25 September 2018 Group stage	Exeter City	2–0	West Ham United U21	Exeter
19:45 BST	Forte 20', 30'	Report		Stadium: St James Park; Attendance: 1,114; Referee: Brett Huxtable

13 November 2018 Group stage	Exeter City	2–0	Bristol Rovers	Exeter
19:45 GMT	Forte 50'; Randall 81'	Report		Stadium: St James Park; Attendance: 873

4 December 2018 Second round	Exeter City	0–2	Peterborough United	Exeter
19:15 GMT		Report	Toney 67'; Cummings 77'	Stadium: St James Park; Attendance: 746

==== Table ====
Pos	Lge	Team	Pld	W	PW	PL	L	GF	GA	GD	Pts	Qualification
1	L2	Exeter City	3	2	1	0	0	4	0	+4	8	Round 2
2	L1	Bristol Rovers	3	2	0	0	1	4	2	+2	6	Round 2
3	L2	Yeovil Town	3	1	0	1	1	4	2	+2	4	
4	ACA	West Ham United U21	3	0	0	0	3	0	8	−8	0	

Source: EFL.com

== Squad list ==
Includes all players registered to the club for any period of time between 1 July 2018 and 30 June 2019. Players registered with club for entire period unless otherwise noted.

Note: Flags indicate national team as defined under FIFA eligibility rules; some limited exceptions apply. Players may hold more than one non-FIFA nationality.

No.	Pos.	Nation	Player
1	GK	ENG	Christy Pym
2	DF	IRL	Pierce Sweeney
3	DF	ENG	Craig Woodman
4	MF	WAL	Lloyd James (Note: Left club permanently during season)
4	DF	IRL	Dara O'Shea (Note: Joined club on loan during season)
5	DF	ENG	Aaron Martin (Note: Joined club permanently during season)
6	MF	ENG	Jordan Tillson
7	MF	ENG	Ryan Harley
7	MF	ENG	Lee Martin
8	MF	ENG	Nicky Law
10	FW	ENG	Lee Holmes
11	FW	ENG	Jayden Stockley (vice-captain)
13	GK	Guernsey	James Hamon
14	FW	BRB	Jonathan Forte
17	FW	ENG	Matt Jay
18	DF	AUS	Jimmy Oates
19	FW	ENG	Tristan Abrahams
21	DF	ENG	Dean Moxey

No.	Pos.	Nation	Player
22	GK	ENG	Chris Weale
23	DF	ENG	Luke Croll
24	FW	IRL	Chiedozie Ogbene
25	MF	WAL	Jake Taylor (captain)
26	MF	ENG	Joel Randall (Note: Left club on loan during season)
27	MF	ENG	Archie Collins
29	MF	ENG	Harry Kite
30	MF	ENG	Joshua Key
31	MF	ENG	Jack Sparkes
32	GK	ENG	Felix Norman
34	DF	ENG	Alex Hartridge
35	FW	ENG	Ben Seymour
36	MF	ENG	James Dodd
37	DF	ENG	Jordan Dyer
39	DF	WAL	Troy Brown
40	MF	WAL	Max Smallcombe
41	MF	ENG	Will Dean
44	MF	ENG	Hiram Boateng
