= Nicky Law (footballer, born 1988) =

English footballer (born 1988)

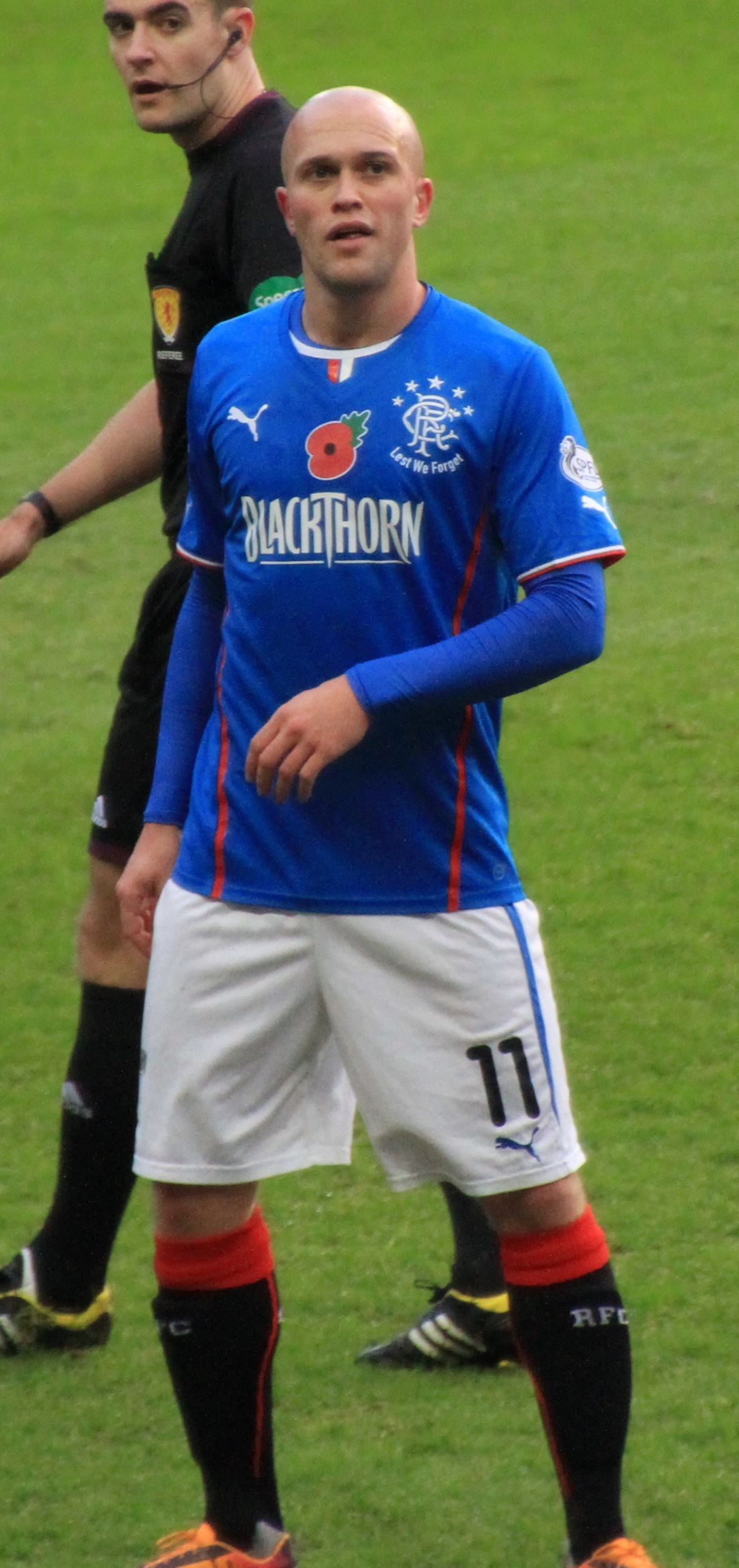
- Law playing for Rangers in 2013

Personal information
- Full name: Nicholas Alexander Law
- Date of birth: 29 March 1988 (age 38)
- Place of birth: Plymouth, England
- Height: 5 ft 10 in (1.78 m)
- Position: Midfielder

Youth career
- –2005: Sheffield United

Senior career*
Years	Team	Apps	(Gls)
2005–2009	Sheffield United	5	(0)
2007	→ Yeovil Town (loan)	6	(0)
2007	→ Bradford City (loan)	10	(2)
2008–2009	→ Bradford City (loan)	33	(3)
2009–2011	Rotherham United	86	(6)
2011–2013	Motherwell	76	(10)
2013–2016	Rangers	86	(20)
2016–2018	Bradford City	78	(4)
2018–2021	Exeter City	93	(18)
2021–2022	Indy Eleven	48	(4)
2022	Tampa Bay Rowdies	12	(1)
2023	Huntsville City	11	(0)

International career
2004	England U17	2	(1)

Managerial career
- 2023: Tampa Bay Rowdies
- * Club domestic league appearances and goals as of 27 July 2023

Nicholas Alexander Law (born 29 March 1988) is an English professional footballer and coach. He is the son of football manager and former player Nicky Law Sr.

Law began his career with Sheffield United, however he failed to make a significant breakthrough into the first team and had loan spells with Yeovil Town and twice at Bradford City. In 2009, he was given a free transfer joining Rotherham United and later moved to Scotland to join Scottish Premier League side Motherwell. Whilst with Motherwell Law was named in the PFA Scotland Team of the Year for season 2012–13 and the following summer joined Rangers.

== Club career ==
=== Sheffield United ===
Law was born in Plymouth, Devon. A member of Sheffield United's academy, he was given a squad number despite only being expected to play in the reserves and Under-18's. However, he made his first team debut as a 58th minute substitute for Colin Marrison in the League Cup against Reading on 25 October 2005. A few weeks later, on 16 November 2005, Law signed a two-year contract with the club.

One year on, but this on 18 October 2006, Law signed a two-year contract extension which will keep him at Sheffield United until 2009. Law made his Premier League debut for the Blades as a 90th-minute substitute against Newcastle United on 4 November 2006. and made his home league debut as week later, as a substitute against Bolton Wanderers at Bramall Lane the following week. He made four Premier League appearances during the 2006–07 season.

Law had to wait until his third senior season to score his first goal for the Blades coming in a second round League Cup tie at MK Dons on 28 August 2007. After his loan spell with Bradford City came to an end, Law played his first match, when he went on as a substitute in the 89th minute, in a 3–0 win over Leicester City. In July 2008, Law then went on a trial with Cheltenham Town.

=== Yeovil Town ===
In February 2006, Law joined Yeovil Town on a month's loan, later extended to two months playing six times whilst at Huish Park. Having made six appearances for the club so far, Law had loan extended with Yeovil Town for another month. However, ten days later, Law was recalled by his parent club.

=== Bradford City ===
He subsequently signed on loan for Bradford City on 5 October after being recommended to the club by his father and former City manager Nicky Law. He scored his first career league goals when he scored twice in the final minutes of Bradford's 4–1 victory over Dagenham & Redbridge on 17 November 2007. He returned to Sheffield United after two months opting to fight for a first team place in the Championship.

In October 2008, Law was again signed on loan at Bradford City, as cover for Joe Colbeck, who was injured in a victory against Grimsby Town. His first game during his second spell was a day later and ended in a 1–0 victory against Bury at Valley Parade, with Law nearly scoring in the first half. He scored the first goal of his second spell in his fifth game to give City a 2–0 victory against Rotherham United at the Don Valley Stadium on 22 November With City suffering a number of injuries to midfielder's, Law's loan deal was extended until the New Year and another time until the end of the season.

Law returned to Bramall Lane at the end of the season having made 29 appearances for the Bantams but was placed on the transfer list as Sheffield United sought to trim their squad.

=== Rotherham United ===
In June 2009, despite interest from both League One and League Two clubs, Law signed a two-year deal with Rotherham United. He left Bramall Lane on a free transfer but with the Blades retaining a 50% sell on clause. Law joined Rotherham United, rather than Bradford City, but stated not joining Bradford was one of the toughest calls to make. However, Law did believe that joining Rotherham United would be the best move for him at that point in his career.

Law went immediately into Rotherham's first team after impressing in pre-season, making a huge impact to the squad and endearing himself with the fans. Consistent outstanding performances throughout the first month of the season brought much praise and attention to the young midfielder. Sky Sports pundits commented that he could "easily play in the championship, if not higher." On the strength of this, Middlesbrough reportedly placed a late deadline day bid, but this was rejected by Rotherham. After topping the list of assists in League Two consistently since the start of the season, Law scored his first goal for Rotherham on 26 September against Barnet. By January, Rotherham turned down another bid for Law, this time a £150,000 offer from Championship side Blackpool. Though the bid was turned down, Manager Ian Holloway, himself, says the club kept himself distance from signing Law. In his first season, Law, along with two other Rotherham United's player, Ian Sharps and Adam Le Fondre, named the 2009–10 Football League Two Team of the Year.

In 2010–11 season, Law starts his season in a match against Cheltenham Town, where he provided four assists, in a 6–4 win and scored his first goal of the season, in a 1–1 draw against Stevenage. Then, on 26 February 2011, Law made a hat-trick of assists, in a 4–2 win over Burton Albion.

Law continued to impress in the 2010–11 season and still do the same thing by topping the list of assists in League Two consistently since the start of the season, which Law was, once again, named the 2009–10 Football League Two Team of the Year, becoming the second member to be named, in the previous season, for the PFA Team of the year in the second consecutive in a row. At the end of the 2010–11 season, Law was among six players to be offered a new contract. But as his contract is about to expire, Law attracted interests clubs from England and Scotland, like Scunthorpe United. Manager Andy Scott says he optimistic for Law to stay at the club, but soon admits Scott gave his best effort to keep Law.

=== Motherwell ===
On 1 July 2011, Law joined SPL side Motherwell on a free transfer, joining up with Stuart McCall, who was his manager at Bradford City in 2008.

Law made his debut, on the opening game of the season, where he provided an assist for Jamie Murphy, in a 3–0 win over Inverness Caledonian Thistle, and described it as a "perfect debut" On 24 August 2011, he scored his first Motherwell goal in a 4–0 League Cup win over Clyde. On 24 January 2012, Law scored his first league goal, in a 3–1 win against Dunfermline Athletic. Law finished the season with seven goals in forty-three appearances in all competitions. Motherwell finished in third place, and following Rangers administration, which meant they could not play in UEFA competitions Motherwell qualified for the Champions League.

In 2012–13 season, Law played his first European match, the Champions League third qualifying round against Greek side Panathinaikos, but the Greek side proved to be too strong and Motherwell failed to win either legs losing 2–0 and 3–0 respectively. Despite the loss, Law spoke of his debut, saying: "It was classic European football, particularly Champions League". In the summer transfer window, Law was the subject of a bid from a League One club, which was rejected. Having made six appearances so far in the season, Law scored his first goal, in a 3–3 draw against Aberdeen on 23 September 2012 and then, on 18 November 2012, made a hat-trick of assists, in a 3–1 win over Inverness Caledonian Thistle. Then, on 27 February 2013, Law provided a double assist, in a 2–1 win over Celtic. A week later, on 30 March 2013, Law scored a brace, in a 3–0 win against Dundee. After a run of good performances, Law was awarded March's Scottish Premier League player of the month. At the end of the 2012–13 season, Law, alongside teammates Shaun Hutchinson, Darren Randolph and Michael Higdon, was named in the PFA Scotland Team of the Year 2012–13. At the end of the season, the club finished in second place behind Celtic, meaning they qualified for Europe for the second season running.

With his contract set to expire at the end of the 2012–13 season, Law had attracted interest from Rangers. In early April, Law was among the players who were offered a new contract by Motherwell. Law said he might stay with the club, but will wait until the season ends before making a decision. On 10 May 2013, Stuart McCall said that Law, along with Randolph, would be leaving the club on a free transfer.

=== Rangers ===
On 24 May 2013, Law agreed to join Rangers on a free transfer, when the Glasgow club's transfer ban is lifted on 1 September. Upon the move, Law stated joining Rangers as "It was impossible for me to turn down. It was probably a once-in-a-lifetime offer for me to sign here." Law went on to say Ally McCoist's tears and passion persuaded him to join the club. In January 2014, Manager McCoist said he didn't have any regrets about signing players in the summer, Law being among them, despite a deterioration of the financial situation at Rangers.

Law scored two goals on his debut, playing as a trialist, in a Challenge Cup win over Albion Rovers. After the match, manager Ally McCoist praised Law's performance in the match. On 10 August 2013, Law played his first League match for Rangers against Brechin City, scoring one goal in a 4–1 victory and providing a double assist for Chris Hegarty for the first goal and Dean Shiels for the fourth goal. Since joining Rangers, manager McCoist says Law is responsible for helping the club by bringing "real calmness" and "an attacking edge". In the club's second game of 2014, Law scored a brace, as Rangers won 2–0 against Stenhousemuir on 5 January 2014. At the conclusion of the winter transfer, Manager McCoist revealed an English club had attempted to sign Law, only the bid was to be rejected, as it was felt the bidding club tried to take advantage of Rangers' financial problem, which turned out to be Blackpool. Law started for Rangers in the 1–0 loss to Raith Rovers in the 2014 Challenge Cup Final, where he missed a number of chances. In the 2014–15 season Law was the highest scoring Rangers player in the league with 13 goals.

Under new manager Mark Warburton, Law made a strong start to the 2015–16 season and scored a goal in a 3–0 victory over Livingston on 12 September 2015. After two months out due to injury, Law returned to the Rangers starting eleven against Hibernian in late December, however his performances since the injury, were not consistent, or good enough to secure a new contract and he was released by Rangers in May 2016.

=== Bradford City ===
Law re-signed for Bradford on 29 June 2016.

He was released by Bradford City at the end of the 2017–18 season.

=== Exeter City ===
Law joined League Two side Exeter City on 2 July 2018. He immediately became a fan favourite, scoring on his debut against Carlisle United and netting many other crucial goals against the likes of MK Dons and Notts County. Nicky scored 10 goals from midfield and notched numerous assists in his first season, collecting 6 awards in the end-of-season awards ceremony.

He performed similarly well in 2019/20, scoring 7 goals and recording 7 assists at the point of the season being suspended. He started in all three games of Exeter's playoff campaign, which ended in defeat at Wembley to Northampton Town.

At the start of the 2020/21 season, Nicky switched from the number 8 shirt to the number 7, vacated by Lee Martin in the summer. He did not play as regularly this season due to the form of younger player, Matt Jay, who played in a similar position to Law. Despite this, Law still scored some crucial goals in his appearances, such as an equaliser (as well as two assists) against League One Gillingham in the second round of the FA Cup. After he captained the club in a 1–0 loss to Carlisle United on 30 January 2021, it was announced that Nicky had the permission of the manager and the board to leave the club before his contract expired, as he had received an offer to join American side Indy Eleven as a player-coach. His final day at the club would be 31 January 2021.

=== Indy Eleven ===
On 30 January 2021, it was announced that Law would join USL Championship side Indy Eleven ahead of their 2021 season.

=== Tampa Bay Rowdies ===
On 21 July 2022, Law was transferred to USL Championship side Tampa Bay Rowdies in exchange for Juan Tejada. Law and the Rowdies mutually agreed to part way on 4 January 2023.

=== Huntsville City ===
On 18 January 2023, Law joined MLS Next Pro expansion club Huntsville as a player-coach.

== Coaching career ==
=== Tampa Bay Rowdies ===
Following a stint as player-coach for Huntsville City, Law returned to the Tampa Bay Rowdies on 27 July 2023 to serve as the club's head coach for the remainder of the 2023 USL Championship season. The Rowdies had been without a head coach since Neill Collins left to take the manager position at Barnsley on 6 July 2023.

== International career ==
Law represented England at youth international level.

== Personal life ==
Law revealed that Stuart McCall is the biggest influence on his career and a massive help. His brother Josh Law is also a professional footballer. Nicky grew up in the village of Old Tupton in North East Derbyshire, Tupton Hall is situated about four miles from Chesterfield. Law also studied at Tupton Primary School and Tupton Hall School, during the latter years of his secondary education he was in the Sheffield United academy alongside fellow professional footballer Lloyd Kerry (now of Harrogate Town FC).

== Career statistics ==
=== Club ===
As of match played 6 November 2022

Appearances and goals by club, season and competition
Club	Season	League			National cup		League cup		Continental		Other		Total	
Club	Season	Division	Apps	Goals	Apps	Goals	Apps	Goals	Apps	Goals	Apps	Goals	Apps	Goals
Sheffield United	2005–06	Championship	0	0	0	0	1	0	—		—		1	0
Sheffield United	2006–07	Premier League	4	0	1	0	2	0	—		—		7	0
Sheffield United	2007–08	Championship	1	0	0	0	1	1	—		—		2	1
Sheffield United	2008–09	Championship	0	0	0	0	0	0	—		0	0	0	0
Sheffield United	Total		5	0	1	0	4	1	—		0	0	10	1
Yeovil Town (loan)	2006–07	League One	6	0	0	0	0	0	—		0	0	6	0
Bradford City (loan)	2007–08	League Two	10	2	0	0	0	0	—		0	0	10	2
Bradford City (loan)	2008–09	League Two	33	3	2	0	0	0	—		0	0	35	3
Bradford City (loan)	Total		43	5	2	0	0	0	—		0	0	45	5
Rotherham United	2009–10	League Two	42	2	3	0	2	0	—		4 (Note: One appearance in Football League Trophy; three appearances in League Two play-offs)	0	51	2
Rotherham United	2010–11	League Two	44	4	2	0	1	0	—		3 (Note: Appearance(s) in Football League Trophy)	0	50	4
Rotherham United	Total		86	6	5	0	3	0	—		7	0	101	6
Motherwell	2011–12	Scottish Premier League	38	4	3	2	2	1	—		—		43	7
Motherwell	2012–13	Scottish Premier League	38	6	1	0	1	0	3 (Note: Two appearances in UEFA Champions League; one appearance in UEFA Europa League)	0	—		43	6
Motherwell	Total		76	10	4	2	3	1	3	0	0	0	86	13
Rangers	2013–14	Scottish League One	32	9	6	1	0	0	—		4 (Note: Appearance(s) in Scottish Challenge Cup)	2	42	12
Rangers	2014–15	Scottish Championship	36	10	3	2	5	0	—		10 (Note: Four appearances one goal in Scottish Challenge Cup; six appearances in Scottish Premiership play-offs)	1	54	13
Rangers	2015–16	Scottish Championship	18	1	3	0	2	0	—		3	0	26	1
Rangers	Total		86	20	12	3	7	0	—		17	3	122	26
Bradford City	2016–17	League One	40	4	1	0	1	0	—		5 (Note: Two appearances one goal in Football League Trophy; three appearances in League One play-offs)	1	47	5
Bradford City	2017–18	League One	38	0	3	0	0	0	—		2	0	43	0
Bradford City	Total		78	4	4	0	1	0	—		7	1	90	5
Exeter City	2018–19	League Two	43	10	1	0	0	0	—		0	0	44	10
Exeter City	2019–20	League Two	32	7	3	0	0	0	—		4	0	39	7
Exeter City	2020–21	League Two	18	1	3	1	0	0	—		2	1	23	3
Exeter City	Total		93	18	7	1	0	0	—		6	1	106	20
Indy Eleven	2021	USL Championship	30	3	—		—		—		—		30	3
Indy Eleven	2022	USL Championship	18	1	1	0	—		—		—		19	1
Indy Eleven	Total		48	4	1	0	—		—		—		49	4
Tampa Bay Rowdies	2022	USL Championship	12	1	0	0	—		—		3 (Note: Appearance(s) in USL Championship playoffs)	1	15	2
Career total			533	68	36	6	18	2	3	0	40	6	630	82

== Honours ==
Rangers

- Scottish Championship: 2015–16
- Scottish League One: 2013–14
- Scottish Challenge Cup: 2015–16

Individual

- PFA Team of the Year: 2009–10 Football League Two, 2010–11 Football League Two
- PFA Scotland Team of the Year 2012–13
- SPL Player of the Month: March 2013
