= Jordan Tillson =

English footballer (born 1993)

Personal information
- Full name: Jordan Roy Tillson
- Date of birth: 5 March 1993 (age 33)
- Place of birth: Bath, England
- Height: 6 ft 0 in (1.83 m)
- Position: Defensive midfielder

Team information
- Current team: Bath City
- Number: 16

Youth career
- –2012: Bristol Rovers

Senior career*
| Years | Team | Apps | (Gls) |
| 2012–2020 | Exeter City | 110 | (2) |
| 2012 | → Gloucester City (loan) | 12 | (0) |
| 2013 | → Chippenham Town (loan) | 3 | (0) |
| 2013 | → Chippenham Town (loan) | 4 | (0) |
| 2015 | → Weston-super-Mare (loan) | 6 | (1) |
| 2019 | → Cheltenham Town (loan) | 14 | (0) |
| 2020–2024 | Ross County | 100 | (1) |
| 2023–2024 | → Dundee United (loan) | 27 | (1) |
| 2024– | Bath City | 83 | (3) |
- * Club domestic league appearances and goals as of 13:37, 6 September 2026 (UTC)

Jordan Roy Tillson (born 5 March 1993) is an English professional footballer who plays as a defensive midfielder for Southern League Premier Division South club Bath City.

== Early life ==
Tillson is the son of former footballer and Exeter City first team coach Andy Tillson.

== Playing career ==
=== Exeter City ===
Tillson made his professional debut for Exeter on 3 May 2014 in a 2–0 victory over Hartlepool at Victoria Park in League Two.

Tillson signed a new contract in May 2014.

On 2 September 2015, Tillson captained Exeter in a 2–0 victory over Portsmouth in the Football League Trophy. On 6 December 2015, Tillson scored the first goal in Exeter's 2–0 victory over Port Vale in the second round proper of the FA Cup. His last appearance for the Grecians came in a 1–0 away win over Forest Green Rovers before his departure 2 weeks later.

==== Gloucester City ====
In August 2012, Tillson joined Gloucester City on an initial one-month loan. His loan was extended by a further month in September.

==== Chippenham Town ====
In February 2013, Tillson, along with Jake Wannell, joined Chippenham Town on a one-month loan. In August 2013, he rejoined the Bluebirds on another one-month loan.

==== Weston-super-Mare ====
In March 2015, Tillson joined Weston-super-Mare on a one-month loan. He made his debut in a 2–1 win over Havant & Waterlooville. Tillson scored an own-goal in the match against Basingstoke Town. He scored his first goal for the Seagulls in a 2–1 defeat to Concord Rangers.

=== Ross County ===
Tillson moved to Scottish Premiership club Ross County in January 2020. He made his debut in a 1–0 defeat to Ayr United in the Scottish Cup. On March 8, 2022, Tillson signed a new two-year contract extension with County keeping him at the club until 2024.

==== Dundee United ====
On 7 September 2023 Tillson signed for Scottish Championship side Dundee United on a season-long loan.

=== Bath City ===
On 13 July 2024, Tillson joined his hometown side, National League South club Bath City.

== Career statistics ==
As of match played 5 September 2026

Appearances and goals by club, season and competition
| Club | Season | League | | | National Cup (Note: Includes FA Cup, Scottish Cup) | | League Cup (Note: Includes EFL Cup, Scottish League Cup) | | Other | | Total | |
| Club | Season | Division | Apps | Goals | Apps | Goals | Apps | Goals | Apps | Goals | Apps | Goals |
|---|---|---|---|---|---|---|---|---|---|---|---|---|
| Exeter City | 2012–13 | League Two | 0 | 0 | 0 | 0 | 0 | 0 | 0 | 0 | 0 | 0 |
| Exeter City | 2013–14 | League Two | 1 | 0 | 0 | 0 | 0 | 0 | 0 | 0 | 1 | 0 |
| Exeter City | 2014–15 | League Two | 3 | 0 | 0 | 0 | 1 | 0 | 1 (Note: Appearance(s) in EFL Trophy) | 0 | 5 | 0 |
| Exeter City | 2015–16 | League Two | 26 | 1 | 2 | 1 | 2 | 0 | 2 | 0 | 32 | 2 |
| Exeter City | 2016–17 | League Two | 20 | 0 | 0 | 0 | 1 | 0 | 1 (Note: One appearance in EFL League Two play-offs) | 0 | 22 | 0 |
| Exeter City | 2017–18 | League Two | 37 | 1 | 3 | 0 | 1 | 0 | 3 (Note: Three appearances in EFL League Two play-offs) | 0 | 44 | 1 |
| Exeter City | 2018–19 | League Two | 21 | 0 | 1 | 1 | 2 | 0 | 1 | 0 | 25 | 1 |
| Exeter City | 2019–20 | League Two | 2 | 0 | 1 | 0 | 1 | 0 | 4 | 1 | 8 | 1 |
| Exeter City | Total | | 110 | 2 | 7 | 2 | 8 | 0 | 12 | 1 | 137 | 5 |
| Gloucester City (loan) | 2012–13 | Conference North | 12 | 0 | 2 | 0 | — | | 0 | 0 | 14 | 0 |
| Chippenham Town (loan) | 2012–13 | Southern League; Premier Division | 3 | 0 | — | | — | | — | | 3 | 0 |
| Chippenham Town (loan) | 2013–14 | Southern League; Premier Division | 4 | 0 | — | | — | | — | | 4 | 0 |
| Weston-super-Mare (loan) | 2014–15 | Conference South | 6 | 1 | — | | — | | — | | 6 | 1 |
| Cheltenham Town (loan) | 2018–19 | League Two | 14 | 0 | — | | — | | — | | 14 | 0 |
| Ross County | 2019–20 | Scottish Premiership | 7 | 0 | 1 | 0 | 0 | 0 | — | | 8 | 0 |
| Ross County | 2020–21 | Scottish Premiership | 32 | 0 | 0 | 0 | 4 | 0 | — | | 36 | 0 |
| Ross County | 2021–22 | Scottish Premiership | 32 | 0 | 0 | 0 | 2 | 0 | — | | 34 | 0 |
| Ross County | 2022–23 | Scottish Premiership | 28 | 1 | 0 | 0 | 2 | 0 | 2 (Note: Appearances in Scottish Premiership play-offs) | 0 | 32 | 1 |
| Ross County | 2023–24 | Scottish Premiership | 1 | 0 | 0 | 0 | 1 | 0 | — | | 2 | 0 |
| Ross County | Total | | 100 | 1 | 1 | 0 | 9 | 0 | 2 | 0 | 112 | 1 |
| Dundee United (loan) | 2023–24 | Scottish Championship | 27 | 1 | 1 | 0 | — | | 3 (Note: Appearances in Scottish Challenge Cup) | 0 | 31 | 1 |
| Bath City | 2024–25 | National League South | 42 | 2 | 3 | 1 | — | | 2 (Note: One appearance in FA Trophy, one appearance in Somerset Premier Cup) | 0 | 47 | 3 |
| Bath City | 2025–26 | National League South | 35 | 1 | 1 | 0 | — | | 3 (Note: Two appearances in FA Trophy, one appearance in Somerset Premier Cup) | 0 | 39 | 1 |
| Bath City | 2026–27 | Southern League; Premier Division | 6 | 0 | 1 | 0 | — | | 0 | 0 | 7 | 0 |
| Bath City | Total | | 83 | 3 | 5 | 1 | — | | 5 | 0 | 93 | 4 |
| Career total | | | 359 | 8 | 16 | 3 | 17 | 0 | 22 | 1 | 414 | 12 |
