= Ben Seymour (footballer) =

English footballer (born 1999)

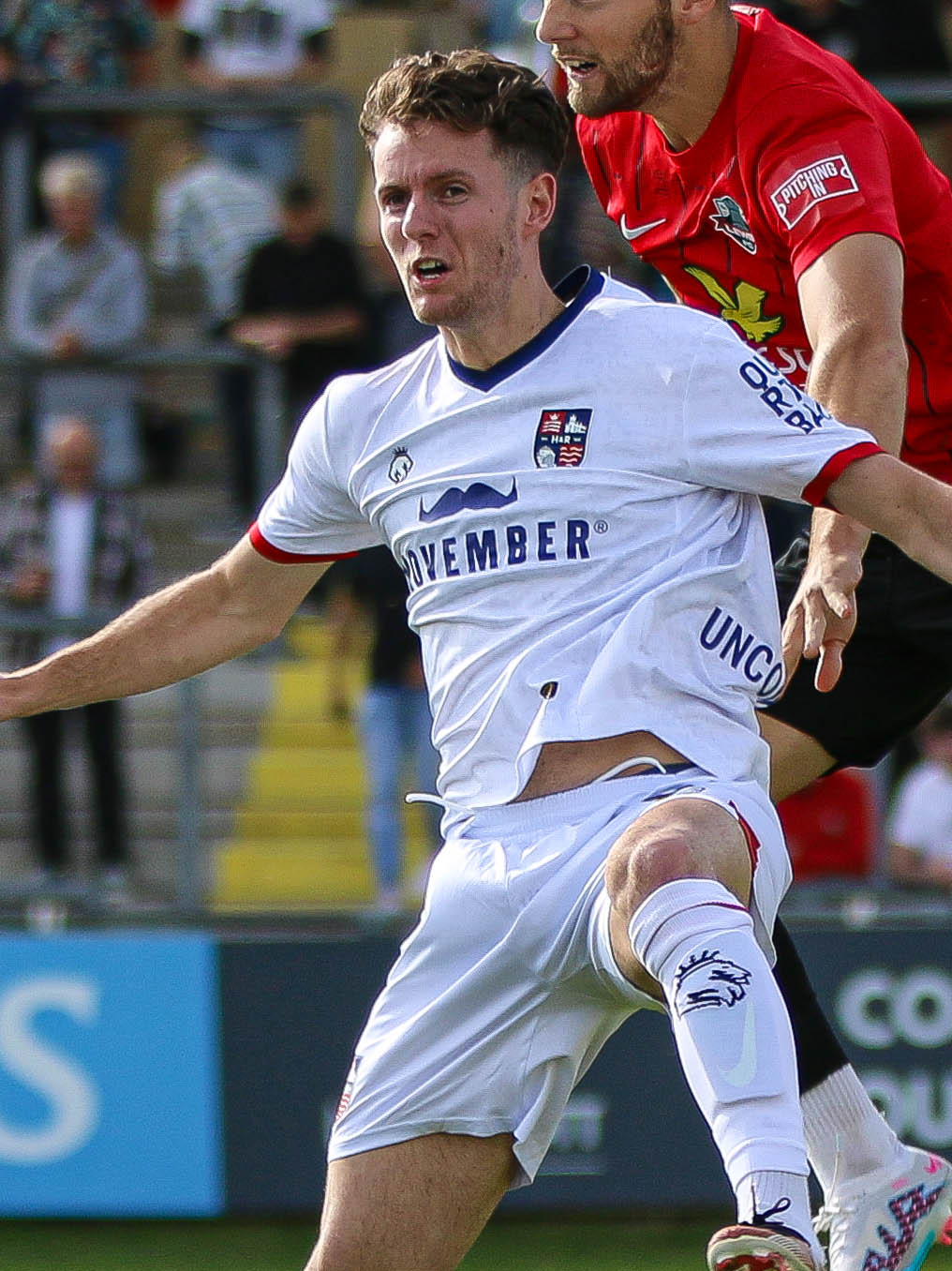
- Seymour playing for Hampton & Richmond Borough in September 2023

Personal information
- Full name: Benjamin Mark Seymour
- Date of birth: 16 April 1999 (age 27)
- Place of birth: Watford, England
- Position: Forward

Team information
- Current team: Taunton Town

Youth career
- 2007–2017: Exeter City

Senior career*
Years	Team	Apps	(Gls)
2017–2022	Exeter City	50	(1)
2017	→ Weston-super-Mare (loan)	8	(0)
2017–2018	→ Bideford (loan)	33	(21)
2018	→ Gloucester City (loan)	12	(1)
2018–2019	→ Dorchester Town (loan)	26	(14)
2021	→ Yeovil Town (loan)	4	(0)
2022	→ Bath City (loan)	11	(0)
2022–2023	Plymouth Parkway	37	(20)
2023–2024	Hampton & Richmond Borough	41	(14)
2024–2026	Torquay United	12	(1)
2024	→ Bath City (loan)	5	(0)
2025	→ AFC Totton (loan)	20	(2)
2025–2026	→ Taunton Town (loan)	21	(7)
2026–2026	Taunton Town	8	(2)
- * Club domestic league appearances and goals as of 17:08, 16 May 2026 (UTC)

Benjamin Mark Seymour (born 16 April 1999) is an English professional footballer who plays as a forward for Southern League Premier Division South club Poole Town.

== Career ==
In April 2017, after progressing through Exeter City's academy, Seymour signed his first professional contract with the club. On 18 July 2017, Seymour signed for National League South club Weston-super-Mare on loan. Seymour made eight appearances for Weston-super-Mare, joining Southern League West club Bideford at the culmination of his loan with Weston-super-Mare. At Bideford, Seymour scored 21 league goals in 33 games during the 2017–18 season. Ahead of the 2018–19 season, Seymour returned to the National League South, signing for Gloucester City on loan. After one goal in twelve appearances for the club, Seymour joined Southern League club Dorchester Town on loan, scoring 14 goals in 26 games in the remainder of the season for the club. On 13 August 2019, Seymour made his professional debut for Exeter, starting in a 4–1 EFL Cup loss against Coventry City. He then made his league debut as a late substitute in a 2–2 draw against Leyton Orient. He scored his first goal for Exeter in an EFL Trophy tie against Swindon Town on 6 October 2020.

On 30 September 2021, Seymour along with Jordan Dyer joined National League club Yeovil Town on a one-month loan deal.

On 21 January 2022, Seymour joined National League South side Bath City on loan for the remainder of the 2021–22 season. Following Exeter's promotion at the end of the 2021–22 season, Seymour was released by the club.

Following his release from Exeter City, Seymour signed for Southern League Premier Division South side Plymouth Parkway.

On 24 May 2023, Seymour agreed to join National League South side, Hampton & Richmond Borough ahead of the 2023–24 campaign. He was awarded the National League South Player of the Month award for October 2023 having scored four goals across the month.

On 13 June 2024, Seymour joined fellow National League South side Torquay United. In November 2024, he joined Bath City on a one-month loan deal.

On 27 June 2025, Seymour Joined Taunton Town on a season long loan from National League South side Torquay United. On 7 January 2026, Seymour signed permanently for Taunton Town agreeing an 18-month deal.

On 3 November 2026, Seymour signed for Poole Town for a club record fee, he made his debut the same day.

== Career statistics ==
As of end of 2025–26 season

Appearances and goals by club, season and competition
Club	Season	League			FA Cup		EFL Cup		Other		Total	
Club	Season	Division	Apps	Goals	Apps	Goals	Apps	Goals	Apps	Goals	Apps	Goals
Exeter City	2017–18	League Two	0	0	0	0	0	0	0	0	0	0
Exeter City	2018–19	League Two	0	0	0	0	0	0	0	0	0	0
Exeter City	2019–20	League Two	11	0	3	0	1	0	8 (Note: Seven appearances in EFL Trophy, one appearance in League Two play-offs)	0	23	0
Exeter City	2020–21	League Two	33	1	2	0	1	0	3 (Note: Appearance(s) in EFL Trophy)	2	39	3
Exeter City	2021–22	League Two	6	0	0	0	1	0	2	0	9	0
Exeter City	Total		50	1	5	0	3	0	13	2	71	3
Weston-super-Mare (loan)	2017–18	National League South	8	0	1	0	—		0	0	9	0
Bideford (loan)	2017–18	Southern League West Division	33	21	—		—		2 (Note: One appearance and one goal in FA Trophy, one appearance and one goal Southern League Cup)	2	35	23
Gloucester City (loan)	2018–19	National League South	12	1	0	0	—		0	0	12	1
Dorchester Town (loan)	2018–19	Southern League Premier Division South	26	14	0	0	—		6 (Note: Five appearances and six goals in FA Trophy, one appearance and one goal Dorset Senior Cup)	7	32	21
Yeovil Town (loan)	2021–22	National League	4	0	2	0	—		0	0	6	0
Bath City (loan)	2021–22	National League South	11	0	—		—		0	0	11	0
Plymouth Parkway	2022–23	Southern League Premier Division South	37	20	5	3	—		4 (Note: One appearance and three goals in Devon Senior Cup, three appearances and one goal in FA Trophy)	4	46	27
Hampton & Richmond Borough	2023–24	National League South	41	14	2	1	—		3 (Note: Appearances in FA Trophy)	1	46	16
Torquay United	2024–25	National League South	12	1	1	0	—		0	0	13	1
Torquay United	2025–26	National League South	0	0	0	0	—		0	0	0	0
Torquay United	Total		12	1	1	0	—		0	0	13	1
Bath City (loan)	2024–25	National League South	5	0	—		—		0	0	5	0
AFC Totton (loan)	2024–25	Southern League Premier Division South	20	2	—		—		2 (Note: Appearances in 2024–25 Southern Football League#Southern League Premier Division South play-offs)	0	22	2
Taunton Town (loan)	2025–26	Southern League Premier Division South	21	7	3	0	—		1 (Note: Appearance in FA Trophy)	0	25	7
Taunton Town	2025–26	Southern League Premier Division South	8	2	—		—		—		8	2
Career total			288	83	19	4	3	0	31	16	341	103

== Honours ==
Individual

- National League South Player of the Month: October 2023
