= Exeter City Supporters' Trust =

Official support society of Exeter City football club

Coordinates: 50.7307°N 3.5208°W

- Abbreviation: ECFCST or The Trust
- Established: 6 May 2000; 26 years ago Purchased the club 5 September 2003; 23 years ago
- Founded at: St James Park, Exeter
- Type: Official Supporters' Society
- Legal status: Community Benefit Society
- Purpose: "To make Exeter City an outstanding community-owned club, playing football at the highest sustainable level"
- Location: Exeter
- Members: c.6,000 (2026)
- Leader: Peter Ferlie
- Affiliations: Football Supporters' Association
- Website: www.weownexetercityfc.co.uk

The Exeter City AFC Supporters' Society, known commonly as the Exeter City Supporters' Trust and abbreviated as ECFCST, or simply The Trust; is a supporters' trust consisting of fans of Exeter City, an English professional football club based in Exeter. It is the majority shareholder of Exeter City, controlling 53.6% of the voting shares in the club. Since taking control, the Trust has handed over more than £1.75 million to the club.

== History ==
=== Formation and purchase of the club ===
The Trust Logo 2000 to 2016.

The Exeter City Supporters' Trust was formed on 6 May 2000, following the club's 2–1 home defeat to Shrewsbury Town, after hearing of the work of the Northampton Town Supporters' Trust. However, it soon became obvious that the directors of the club only saw the Trust as a "cash cow" and had no intention of giving up any real power or allowing any insight into how the club was being run. This led to a change of the Trust's constitution in February 2003 from supporting the club to owning it. The Trust had originally been set up to raise enough money to sign forward Gary Alexander, who had previously been at the club on loan. At the time of the change, the Trust had 211 members and around £11,000.

On 14 May 2003, shortly after Exeter City's relegation to the Conference, John Russell and Mike Lewis (the chairman and vice-chairman at the time) were arrested over allegations of financial irregularities at the club. It later emerged that Uri Geller (who was co-chairman of the club at the time) was one of the people who had contacted the police. After Russell and Lewis' arrest, then Trust chairman Ian Huxham, chief executive Terry Pavey and Julian Tagg, all of which were prominent members of the Supporters' Trust at the time, were appointed as directors of the club. At this point, it seemed likely that then owner Ivor Doble would be asked to hand over his shareholding to the Trust. Shortly after, Doble asked the Trust to take over the day-to-day running of the club.

In September 2003, Dr David Treharne (who would later become the chairman of the Trust), his solicitor Simon Armitage, Ed Probert and Martin Ellicott, on behalf of the Supporters' Trust, went to Doble's jewellers in Exeter in their lunch break and handed over a cheque for £20,000 to purchase the club, which was "pretty much everything the Trust had". The Trust's purchase of the club was announced on 5 September. In October 2003, the club entered a Company Voluntary Arrangement, which was accepted by 88% of the creditors, in order to reduce the £4.5 million debt Russell and Lewis had left behind. In April 2007, Russell and Lewis pleaded guilty to various criminal offences related to their time in charge of the club. Russell was sentenced to 21 months in prison, whilst Lewis was ordered to complete 200 hours of community service. In February 2008, both Russell and Lewis were permanently suspended from football by the FA.

=== Debt free era (2005–2014) ===
On 8 January 2005, Exeter City drew 0–0 against Manchester United at Old Trafford in the 3rd round of the FA Cup. City eventually fell to a 2–0 defeat in the televised replay at St James Park 11 days later, with Cristiano Ronaldo and Wayne Rooney scoring the goals. The income from these two games, just under £1 million, led to the club's debts being virtually cleared.

In June 2008, the Trust's membership surpassed the 2,500 mark following the club's return to the Football League. In 2012, the Trust membership reached its peak at over 4,000 members, but it has since dropped to just over 3,000.

In May 2012, the Trust was criticised for changing its funding of the club from a loan to a donation. This was done due to rule changes in League Two which stated that clubs could not spend more than 55% of turnover on player wages. Loans were considered as turnover, whereas donations were not. As a result, former chairman Treharne called for the Trust to be more transparent in the way it makes decisions.

In October 2013, as part of the 10 year anniversary of the Exeter City Supporters' Trust taking control of the club, Kevin Rye told the BBC:

"Exeter are one of the most important stories in the history of football fan-ownership but are often overlooked because it's become the norm. They were trailblazers and have been a very important part of what, for example, Wrexham and Chester have done. They've demonstrated what we think football clubs should be all about - a long-term proposition for people who care about the club".

— Kevin Rye, Supporters Direct, BBC Sport

=== PFA loan and re-structuring of the club board ===
In June 2014, the club received a short-term loan for £100,000 from the PFA (which comes with a transfer embargo) in order to help with the running costs. The club stated that the short-term loan was needed due to a fall in attendances and a lower than expected uptake of season ticket renewals. Both the club and the Trust were heavily criticised following the news, with the Trust being accused of not monitoring the club well or reporting back to its members. This led to a restructuring process at the club, with the chairman and chief executive resigning over the summer and the secretary (who was also a director of the Trust) leaving both of his roles. In light of the changes at the club, the Trust increased its representation on the club board to 50%, with it now being made up of four Trust board members and four club directors. Prior to these changes, the Trust's stake entitled it to elect two of its board members to the club board. The loan was repaid on 15 August 2014, lifting with it the club's transfer embargo.

=== Club loan repaid ===
On 10 February 2021 it was announced that the long-term financial loan provided to the football club had been repaid to the Supporters' Trust. A total of £830,058 was paid back to the Trust, with a proportion of the money to be invested and the club retaining access to the same amount of working capital. The Trust also announced that it had suspended payment of its annual £100,000 donation to the club since the autumn of 2020.

On 5 May 2021, Exeter City were named top of the Fan Engagement Index table for the second year running. In response to both the accolade and the 2021 attempts by elite European clubs to form the European Super League, chairman Nick Hawker told the BBC:

"Listening to what fans want could solve a lot of football's problems. Who owns the club? Nobody really. Most clubs in the United Kingdom were born in the late 1800s or early 1900s often through churches or working men's clubs and they are so deeply-rooted in the community. We don't own Exeter City, it's in our safe-keeping. That's what some Premier League owners have to understand."

— Nick Hawker, Exeter City Supporters' Trust, BBC Sport

On 23 March 2023, the club were named top of the Fan Engagement Index table for the fourth consecutive year. Think Fan Engagement owner, Kevin Rye, said after the club's fourth successive victory:

"Once again, Exeter City have won, and I’m not surprised. The question is always: can they keep delivering, and the answer so far is yes.

"I get asked regularly why Exeter City does so well in the Fan Engagement Index. It's because that at the heart of everything they do is a commitment to genuine, transparent dialogue, done because it's the right thing to do.

"Not only is it the right thing to do, given their recent excellent financial results, we can now say with certainty that it makes good business sense as well."

— Kevin Rye, Think Fan Engagement, Exeter City

== Fundraising ==
=== Red or Dead? ===
The Red or Dead? scheme was started in July 2004 by then managing director Ian Huxham, in a bid to pay off the remaining debts following the CVA agreement. The intended target was to raise £750,000, with 1,500 fans pledging £500 each. Despite the FA Cup draw with Manchester United in January 2005 wiping out the club's debt, the campaign raised £140,000. In 2009, a plaque was placed at St James Park as a tribute to the 247 people who pledged money towards the scheme.

=== 1931 Fund ===
In 2009, the Exeter Exiles supporters' group, together with the Supporters' Trust, set up the 1931 Fund (named after the club's FA Cup run in the same year) with the purpose of financing an additional member of the first team squad. This player wears the number 31 shirt at the club. The fund is run on behalf of the Supporters' Trust by the Exeter Exiles. As of the end of the 2019–20 season, the 1931 Fund have contributed over £190,000 to player wages at Exeter City.

12 men's team players have worn the number 31 shirt since the fund started:

As of 12 July 2024:

Player	Years	Wages pledged by the fund
James Norwood	2009–11	£17,000 (£10,000 in first season, £7,000 in second season)
Callum McNish	2011–12	£15,000
Elliott Chamberlain	2012–14	£23,000 (£13,000 and £10,000)
Graham Cummins	2014–15	£15,000
Joel Grant	2015–16	£15,000
Pierce Sweeney	2016–17	£15,000
Jack Sparkes	2017–19	£25,000 (£10,000 and £15,000)
Noah Smerdon	2019–2020	£15,000
Jordan Dyer	2020–2021	£15,000 pledged
Josh Coley	2021–2022	Undisclosed
Vincent Harper	2023–2024	Undisclosed
Jay Bird	2024–2025	Undisclosed
Jake Doyle-Hayes	2025–Present	Undisclosed

Since 2021, the 1931 Fund has also sponsored a member of the women's team.

2 women's team players have worn the number 31 shirt since 2021:

As of 13 August 2023:

Player	Years	Donation pledged by the fund
Meg Robinson	2021–22	TBC
Ellen Dixon	2022–23	£3,000

=== Pitch In For City ===
In February 2010, the Supporters' Trust began a fund raising scheme called 'Pitch In For City'. The scheme's purpose was to raise £150,000 in order to move, drain and relay the playing surface at St. James Park for the first time in 106 years. This was seen as a necessary step in order for the club to reach the Championship. Many fundraising events were planned, such as a horse race night and an evening with former City manager Eamonn Dolan and former players Dean Moxey and George Friend all talking about their times at the club, amongst others. Proceeds from other events, such as a music concert at Rougemont Gardens, former Grecians Barry McConnell and Scott Hiley running the Great West Run to raise money and 50% of the profits of Nick Spencer's Never say die: the remarkable rise of Exeter City book; also contributed to the scheme. By 24 June, the scheme had raised over £40,000, even before the evening with Dolan, Moxey and Friend and the Great West Run.

The new pitch was relaid over the summer and was first played on on 27 July, in City's 3-1 pre-season friendly win over Bristol City.

On 18 February 2011, the club announced that they would be taking legal advice over the state of the new pitch, after a league game against Swindon Town was postponed due to bad weather. City manager Paul Tisdale said at the time that the pitch was "worse than last year".

=== Light Up The Park ===
In December 2013, the Trust began a fund raising scheme called 'Light Up the Park' to raise money for new floodlights to be installed at St James Park, which culminated in £12,200 being raised and the floodlights being installed ahead of the club's home game against Shrewsbury Town on 22 November 2014.

== Sponsorship ==
The Trust currently sponsor players of the Exeter City Ladies team. For the 2014–15 season, the Trust renewed its sponsorship of Lola Sanchez, Helen Kukor and Tash Knapman for a further year. On 17 August 2015, it was announced that the Trust had committed itself to sponsoring three members of the ladies team for the following three seasons. For the 2015–16 season, the Trust sponsored players were Helen Kukor, Vic Barter and Leah Brooks.

== Volunteering ==
As Exeter City are owned by the Supporters' Trust, the club does not have the same financial capabilities as those clubs with wealthy backers. This means that plenty of work is done by volunteers. In 2015, it was estimated that volunteers had done £310,000 worth of work, spread over 28,000 hours, in the last year alone. This was an increase of 50% compared to the 2012 figures.

== Notable members ==
Former Exeter players Jamie Reid and Matt Grimes, soul singer-songwriter Joss Stone and actor Ade Edmondson are all members of the Trust. Edmondson even wrote the foreword to Nick Spencer's Never say die: the remarkable rise of Exeter City, in which he states he is a member.

== Other clubs ==
As well as being the majority shareholder of Exeter City, the Trust is also a shareholder of American football team Chattanooga FC.

== See also ==
- Exeter City F.C.
- Supporters Direct
- List of fan-owned sports teams
- James Norwood
- Callum McNish
- Elliott Chamberlain
- Graham Cummins
- Joel Grant
- Pierce Sweeney
- Jack Sparkes
- Jordan Dyer
