= Will Dean (footballer) =

English footballer

Personal information
- Full name: William Luke Dean
- Date of birth: 28 September 2000 (age 26)
- Place of birth: England
- Position: Midfielder

Team information
- Current team: Truro City

Youth career
- –2017: Exeter City

Senior career*
Years	Team	Apps	(Gls)
2017–2021	Exeter City	2	(0)
2019–2020	→ Truro City (loan)	30	(3)
2020	→ Bath City (loan)	5	(0)
2021–	Truro City	170	(15)
- * Club domestic league appearances and goals as of 21:26, 26 April 2025 (UTC)

William Luke Dean (born 28 September 2000) is an English professional footballer who plays as a midfielder for National League South club Truro City.

== Career ==
After progressing through the academy, Dean made his first-team debut in November 2017 during Exeter City's EFL Trophy tie against Chelsea U21s, being substituted on for Kane Wilson in the 63rd minute. In April 2018, Dean was offered a professional contract by Exeter for the following season. He spent the entirety of the (curtailed) 2019–20 season on loan at Truro City, joining initially for six months before the deal was extended in January 2020. The White Tigers sat atop the Southern League Premier Division South table when the decision to formally abandon the season due to the COVID-19 pandemic was made in March 2020.

On 12 September 2020, Dean made his league debut in a 2–2 draw against Salford City at Moor Lane, with his home league debut coming in the following fixture against Port Vale. Later that season, in November, Dean joined Bath City on a one-month loan deal.

Dean was released at the end of the season following the expiration of his contract, with manager Matt Taylor citing the lack of a clear pathway to first team football as the reason behind not offering him a new deal. Following his release, Dean joined Southern League Premier Division South side Truro City ahead of the 2021–22 season, reportedly rejecting offers from clubs higher up the football pyramid.

== Personal life ==
Dean's brother Tom is also a professional footballer who currently plays for Exeter City.

== Career statistics ==
As of match played 26 April 2025

Appearances and goals by club, season and competition
Club	Season	League			FA Cup		League Cup		Other		Total	
Club	Season	Division	Apps	Goals	Apps	Goals	Apps	Goals	Apps	Goals	Apps	Goals
Exeter City	2017–18	EFL League Two	0	0	0	0	0	0	1 (Note: Appearances in the EFL Trophy)	0	1	0
Exeter City	2018–19	EFL League Two	0	0	0	0	0	0	3	0	3	0
Exeter City	2019–20	EFL League Two	0	0	0	0	0	0	3	0	3	0
Exeter City	2020–21	EFL League Two	2	0	0	0	1	0	3	0	6	0
Exeter City	Total		2	0	0	0	1	0	10	0	13	0
Truro City (loan)	2019–20	Southern League Premier Division South	30	2	2	0	–		2 (Note: Appearances in FA Trophy)	0	34	2
Bath City (loan)	2020–21	National League South	5	0	0	0	–		2	0	7	0
Truro City	2021–22	Southern League Premier Division South	42	4	2	0	–		4	0	48	4
Truro City	2022–23	Southern League Premier Division South	42	4	0	0	–		3 (Note: 2 appearances in Southern League Premier Division South play-offs, 1 appearance in FA Trophy)	0	45	4
Truro City	2023–24	National League South	43	3	1	0	–		1	0	45	3
Truro City	2024–25	National League South	43	4	0	0	–		1	0	44	4
Truro City	Total		170	15	3	0	0	0	9	0	182	15
Career total			207	17	5	0	1	0	23	0	236	17
