= Max Smallcombe =

English-born Cornish footballer

Personal information
- Full name: Max Frederick Smallcombe
- Date of birth: 27 March 1999 (age 27)
- Place of birth: Truro, England
- Height: 5 ft 8 in (1.72 m)
- Position: Midfielder

Youth career
- 2009–2016: Exeter City

Senior career*
Years	Team	Apps	(Gls)
2016–2019	Exeter City	0	(0)
2017–2018	→ Bideford (loan)	11	(0)
2018–2019	→ Tiverton Town (loan)	25	(1)
2019–2020	Bideford	16	(2)
2020–2021	Bodmin Town		
2021–2023	Loughborough Students	49	(5)

International career
- Wales U16
2015–2016	Wales U17	4	(0)
- Wales U19
- * Club domestic league appearances and goals as of 16:54, 24 December 2023 (UTC)

Max Frederick Smallcombe (born 27 March 1999) is a Welsh professional footballer who plays as a midfielder.

== Club career ==
Smallcombe came through the Exeter City Academy to make his first-team debut on 30 August 2016, in a 4–2 defeat at Oxford United in an EFL Trophy group stage match. He turned professional at Exeter in April 2017, having successfully captained the youth team to a league title in the 2016–17 season.

He started the 2017–18 season on loan at Southern League Division One West club Bideford. He scored his first goals in senior football with a brace on 2 September, helping the "Robins" to a 5–1 victory over Bishop's Cleeve in an FA Cup qualification match at The Sports Ground. Manager Sean William Joyce went on to praise his professionalism, stating that he was badly missed by the team after he picked up a hamstring injury in September.

On 28 September 2019, Smallcombe returned to Bideford.

== International career ==
Smallcome made his debut for the Wales under-17 team in a UEFA European Under-17 Championship qualification victory over the Netherlands at Dragon Park on 22 October 2015, and went on to win a total of four caps.

== Career statistics ==
As of match played 20 September 2017

Appearances and goals by club, season and competition
Club	Season	League			FA Cup		League Cup		Other		Total	
Club	Season	Division	Apps	Goals	Apps	Goals	Apps	Goals	Apps	Goals	Apps	Goals
Exeter City	2016–17	League Two	0	0	0	0	0	0	1 (Note: Appearance in the EFL Trophy)	0	1	0
Exeter City	2017–18	League Two	0	0	0	0	0	0	0	0	0	0
Exeter City	Total		0	0	0	0	0	0	1	0	1	0
Bideford (loan)	2017–18	SFL - Division One West	5	0	3	2	—		0	0	8	2
Career total			5	0	3	2	0	0	1	0	9	2
