= Jimmy Oates =

Australian soccer player

Personal information
- Date of birth: 19 March 1991 (age 35)
- Place of birth: North Sydney, Australia
- Height: 1.81 m (5 ft 11 in)
- Position: Defender

Team information
- Current team: Lambton Jaffas
- Number: 12

Youth career
- Manly United
- 2010–2011: Central Coast Mariners

Senior career*
Years	Team	Apps	(Gls)
2011–2013	Central Coast Mariners	0	(0)
2011	→ Manly United (loan)		
2013–2014	Manly United	15	(1)
2015–2018	Hereford		
2018–2019	Exeter City	0	(0)
2019	→ Hereford (loan)	7	(1)
2020–2023	Manly United	65	(5)
2023–	Lambton Jaffas		
- * Club domestic league appearances and goals as of 6 October 2023

James Oates (born 19 March 1991) is an Australian semi-professional soccer player who plays as a defender for NPL NNSW club Lambton Jaffas.

== Career ==
=== Early career ===
Oates began his career with Manly United, before signing for the Central Coast Mariners youth team in 2010. He joined up with the side for the 2010–11 pre-season, making his debut against Riverina U23s – coming on as a substitute and scoring a goal. Oates impressed during his first season, and was handed a trial with League One side Sheffield United, but returned to Central Coast Mariners for the start of the 2011–12. In his second season with the Mariners, Oates captained the side to glory in the National Youth League, earning himself a one-year professional contract with the senior Central Coast Mariners side for their 2012–13 campaign.

An ankle injury sustained during pre-season meant he was unable to break into the first team and, following further setbacks, Oates was released from his contract early. After his release from Central Coast Mariners, Oates returned to Manly United. A teammate of his persuaded him to apply to Hartpury College, England, to study, play football, and see a world outside of Australia.

=== Hereford ===
In 2015, Oates signed for the newly-formed Hereford, a phoenix club setup by fans following the demise of Hereford United. Following a successful first season, in which the Australian played 41 times for the club as they won the Midland Football League Premier Division title and reached the final of the FA Vase, Oates signed on with Hereford for the 2016–17 season. Oates was named captain for the 2017–18 season. He signed a new deal with Hereford ahead of the 2018–19 season. During his 3 seasons with Hereford, Oates made 136 appearances in all competitions.

=== Exeter City ===
On 24 July 2018, following a trial period, Oates was formally announced as an Exeter City player. Oates had previously worked alongside his new manager, Matt Taylor, while studying at Hartpury College. He made his debut for the club in a 0–2 defeat away to Fulham in the EFL Cup.

On 24 January 2019, Oates rejoined Hereford on loan until the end of the 2018–19 season. On 12 March 2019, Oates was re-called from Hereford with immediate effect, due to a number of injuries in Exeter City's squad.

He was released by Exeter at the end of the 2018–19 season.

=== Return to Manly ===
Oates returned to Manly United in the 2020 National Premier Leagues season.

=== Lambton Jaffas ===
In August 2023, Oates signed for Newcastle-based NPL NNSW club Lambton Jaffas.
