= Jordan Dyer =

English footballer (born 2000)

Personal information
- Full name: Jordan Paul Dyer
- Date of birth: 29 May 2000 (age 26)
- Place of birth: Exeter, England
- Position: Defender

Team information
- Current team: Torquay United
- Number: 4

Youth career
- Exeter City

Senior career*
Years	Team	Apps	(Gls)
2018–2022	Exeter City	2	(0)
2018	→ Bideford (loan)	1	(0)
2019	→ Tiverton Town (loan)	14	(0)
2019–2020	→ Tiverton Town (loan)	26	(2)
2020	→ Chippenham Town (loan)	4	(0)
2021	→ Yeovil Town (loan)	1	(0)
2021	→ Bath City (loan)	7	(3)
2022	→ Bath City (loan)	14	(0)
2022–2024	Bath City	76	(5)
2024–	Torquay United	60	(5)
- * Club domestic league appearances and goals as of 19:26, 1 February 2026 (UTC)

Jordan Paul Dyer (born 29 May 2000) is an English semi professional footballer who plays as a defender for National League South club Torquay United.

== Playing career ==
Dyer turned professional at Exeter City in April 2018. He was briefly loaned out to Southern League Division One South side Bideford, featuring as a late substitute in a 4–1 win at Barnstaple Town on 26 December 2018. Two months later he joined Southern League Premier Division South club Tiverton Town on loan, featuring 14 times by the end of the 2018–19 season. He rejoined Tiverton on loan for the 2019–20 season and scored his first goal for Martyn Rogers' "Tivvy" in a 2–1 victory at Poole Town on 13 August. He made his first-team debut for Exeter on 4 December 2019, in a 0–0 draw with Oxford United at St James Park in the EFL Trophy. He started in the EFL Trophy semi-final against Portsmouth at Fratton Park.

On 30 September 2021, Dyer along with Ben Seymour joined National League club Yeovil Town on a one-month loan deal.

Having spent two times at the club on loan previously, Dyer joined National League South side Bath City on a permanent basis in June 2022 following his release from Exeter.

On 28 June 2024, Dyer joined National League South side Torquay United on a two-year deal.

== Style of play ==
Dyer is able to play as a defender or midfielder and is noted for his toughness.

== Career statistics ==
As of match played 31 January 2026

Appearances and goals by club, season and competition
Club	Season	League			FA Cup		EFL Cup		Other		Total	
Club	Season	Division	Apps	Goals	Apps	Goals	Apps	Goals	Apps	Goals	Apps	Goals
Exeter City	2018–19	League Two	0	0	0	0	0	0	0	0	0	0
Exeter City	2019–20	League Two	0	0	0	0	0	0	3 (Note: Appearance(s) in the EFL Trophy)	0	3	0
Exeter City	2020–21	League Two	1	0	0	0	0	0	3	0	4	0
Exeter City	2021–22	League Two	1	0	0	0	1	0	1	0	3	0
Exeter City	Total		2	0	0	0	1	0	7	0	10	0
Bideford (loan)	2018–19	Southern League Division One South	1	0	0	0	—		0	0	1	0
Tiverton Town (loan)	2018–19	Southern League Premier Division South	14	0	0	0	—		0	0	14	0
Tiverton Town (loan)	2019–20	Southern League Premier Division South	26	2	2	1	—		2 (Note: Appearances in the FA Trophy)	0	30	3
Chippenham Town (loan)	2020–21	National League South	4	0	2	0	—		0	0	6	0
Yeovil Town (loan)	2021–22	National League	1	0	0	0	—		0	0	1	0
Bath City (loan)	2021–22	National League South	21	3	0	0	—		3 (Note: One appearance in FA Trophy, two appearances in Somerset Premier Cup)	0	24	3
Bath City	2022–23	National League South	38	3	3	0	—		8 (Note: Three appearances in FA Trophy, five appearances in Somerset Premier Cup)	0	49	3
Bath City	2023–24	National League South	38	2	3	0	—		6 (Note: Three appearances in FA Trophy, two appearances in Somerset Premier Cup, one appearance in National League South play-offs)	0	47	2
Bath City	Total		76	5	6	0	—		14	0	96	5
Torquay United	2024–25	National League South	32	4	0	0	—		3 (Note: Two appearances in FA Trophy, one appearance in National League South play-offs)	0	35	4
Torquay United	2025–26	National League South	28	1	1	0	—		1	0	30	1
Torquay United	Total		60	5	1	0	—		4	0	65	5
Career total			205	15	11	1	1	0	30	0	247	16
