= 2021–22 Exeter City F.C. season =

Exeter City
2021–22 season
- Chairman: Nick Hawker
- Manager: Matt Taylor
- Stadium: St James Park
- League Two: 2nd (promoted)
- FA Cup: Second round
- EFL Cup: First round
- EFL Trophy: Second round
- Top goalscorer: League: Matt Jay (14 goals); All: Matt Jay (16 goals)
- Average home league attendance: 5,312
Home colours	Away colours	Third colours

The 2021–22 season was Exeter City's 120th year in their history, and their tenth and final consecutive season in League Two. After finishing second in the League Two table, the club achieved promotion to League One for the 2022–23 season. Along with the league, the club also competed in the FA Cup, the EFL Cup and the EFL Trophy. The season covers the period from 1 July 2021 to 30 June 2022.

== Pre-season friendlies ==
Exeter City announced they will play friendlies against Weston-super-Mare, Tiverton Town, Taunton Town, Bath City, Weymouth, Cardiff City, Bristol City, Shrewsbury Town and Truro City as part of their pre-season preparations.

6 July 2021 Friendly	Weston-super-Mare	2–1	Exeter City	Weston-super-Mare
19:45 BST	Grubb 11'; Vowles 25'	Report	Collins 80'	Stadium: The Optima Stadium

9 July 2021 Scott Rogers testimonial	Tiverton Town	0–1	Exeter City	Tiverton
19:30 BST		Report	Seymour 61'	Stadium: Ian Moorcroft Stadium

13 July 2021 Friendly	Taunton Town	0–5	Exeter City	Taunton
19:30 BST		Report	Seymour 5', 51'; Brown 55'; Nombe 63', 82'	Stadium: Cygnet Health Care Stadium

16 July 2021 Friendly	Bath City	3–4	Exeter City	Twerton
19:00 BST	Cooke 39'; Smith 76', 81'	Report	Dodd 17'; Nombe 30', 57'; Jay 83'	Stadium: Twerton Park

20 July 2021 Friendly	Weymouth	2–3	Exeter City	Weymouth
19:30 BST	Rose 60'; Cordner 90'	Report	Jay 4'; Brown 16'; Nombe 51'	Stadium: Bob Lucas Stadium

24 July 2021 Friendly	Cardiff City	2–2	Exeter City	Leckwith
15:00 BST	Collins 43'; Harris 65' (pen.)	Report	Jay 22'; Sweeney 50'	Stadium: Cardiff International Sports Stadium

27 July 2021 Friendly	Exeter City	0–4	Bristol City	Clyst St Mary
13:00 BST		Report	Wells 8' (pen.), 82'; Bakinson 38' (pen.); Nagy 62'	Stadium: Cliff Hill Training Ground; Attendance: 0 (Behind-closed-doors)

31 July 2021 Friendly	Exeter City	0–2	Shrewsbury Town	Exeter
15:00 BST		Report	Udoh (?)	Stadium: St James Park

3 August 2021 Friendly	Truro City	1–0	Exeter City	Plymouth
19:30 BST	Harvey 22'	Report		Stadium: Bolitho Park

== Competitions ==
=== League Two ===
==== League table ====
Pos	Team	Pld	W	D	L	GF	GA	GD	Pts	Promotion, qualification or relegation
1	Forest Green Rovers (C, P)	46	23	15	8	75	44	+31	84	Promotion to EFL League One
2	Exeter City (P)	46	23	15	8	65	41	+24	84	Promotion to EFL League One
3	Bristol Rovers (P)	46	23	11	12	71	49	+22	80	Promotion to EFL League One
4	Northampton Town	46	23	11	12	60	38	+22	80	Qualification for League Two play-offs
5	Port Vale (O, P)	46	22	12	12	67	46	+21	78	Qualification for League Two play-offs
6	Swindon Town	46	22	11	13	77	54	+23	77	Qualification for League Two play-offs

Source: EFL Official Website
Rules for classification: 1) Points; 2) Goal difference; 3) Number of goals scored; 4) Head-to-head results; 5) Wins; 6) Away goals; 7) Penalty points (sec 9.5); 8) 12-point sending off offences
(C) Champions; (O) Play-off winners; (P) Promoted

==== Results summary ====
Overall								Home						Away					
Pld	W	D	L	GF	GA	GD	Pts	W	D	L	GF	GA	GD	W	D	L	GF	GA	GD
46	23	15	8	65	41	+24	84	14	6	3	37	19	+18	9	9	5	28	22	+6

Last updated: 7 May 2022.

==== Results by matchday ====
Matchday	1	2	3	4	5	6	7	8	9	10	11	12	13	14	15	16	17	18	19	20	21	22	23	24	25	26	27	28	29	30	31	32	33	34	35	36	37	38	39	40	41	42	43	44	45	46
Ground	H	A	A	H	A	H	A	H	A	H	A	H	A	H	A	H	H	A	A	H	H	A	A	H	A	H	A	H	A	H	A	A	H	H	H	A	A	H	A	A	H	A	H	H	A	H
Result	D	L	D	W	D	D	W	W	D	D	D	D	W	W	W	W	W	L	D	L	L	L	D	W	W	D	W	W	W	W	D	L	W	D	W	W	D	W	W	W	W	L	W	W	D	L
Position	15	20	20	12	11	13	8	5	6	6	10	9	7	4	4	3	2	2	3	4	5	8	8	8	8	8	7	6	4	3	4	8	3	5	5	2	2	2	2	2	2	2	2	2	1	2

Updated to match(es) played on 7 May 2022. Source: Statto.com
A = Away; H = Home; W = Win; D = Draw; L = Loss

==== Matches ====
The Grecians' fixtures were released on 24 June 2021.

7 August 2021 1	Exeter City	0–0	Bradford City	Exeter
15:00 BST	Dieng (yellow card) 21'; Atangana (yellow card) 67'	Report		Stadium: St James Park; Attendance: 5,609; Referee: Sam Allison

14 August 2021 2	Leyton Orient	3–0	Exeter City	Leyton
15:00 BST	Drinan 7'; Beckles 25'; James (yellow card) 59'; Archibald 77'	Report	Grounds (yellow card) 25' (yellow-red card) 74'; Jay (penalty missed) 65'	Stadium: Breyer Group Stadium; Attendance: 4,860; Referee: Tom Reeves

17 August 2021 3	Barrow	0–0	Exeter City	Barrow-in-Furness
19:45 BST	Zanzala (yellow card) 18'; Ellis (yellow card) 52'; White (yellow card) 84'	Report	Dieng (yellow card) 47'; Jay (yellow card) 53'	Stadium: Progression Solicitors Stadium; Attendance: 2,667; Referee: Andrew Kitchen

21 August 2021 4	Exeter City	4–1	Bristol Rovers	Exeter
15:00 BST	Jay 3', 15'; Dieng 22'; Kite 24'; Edwards (yellow card) 87'	Report	Baldwin (yellow card) 24'; Finley (yellow card) 59' (goal) 70'	Stadium: St James Park; Attendance: 5,284; Referee: Chris Sarginson

28 August 2021 5	Harrogate Town	1–1	Exeter City	Harrogate
15:00 BST	Muldoon 43' (pen.); Page (yellow card) 61'	Report	Kite (yellow card) 23' (yellow-red card) 42'; Key 79'	Stadium: EnviroVent Stadium; Attendance: 1,883; Referee: Seb Stockbridge

4 September 2021 6	Exeter City	0–0	Forest Green Rovers	Exeter
15:00 BST	Ray (yellow card) 41'	Report		Stadium: St James Park; Attendance: 4,008; Referee: Neil Hair

11 September 2021 7	Scunthorpe United	0–4	Exeter City	Scunthorpe
15:00 BST		Report	Jay 41', 46'; Kite (yellow card) 49'; Key 57'; Dieng 75'	Stadium: The Sands Venue Stadium; Attendance: 2,443; Referee: Carl Brook

18 September 2021 8	Exeter City	2–0	Sutton United	Exeter
15:00 BST	Goodliffe 68' (o.g.); Nombe 84'	Report		Stadium: St James Park; Attendance: 4,511; Referee: Scott Oldham

25 September 2021 9	Hartlepool United	1–1	Exeter City	Hartlepool
15:00 BST	Molyneux 25'; Byrne (yellow card) 90+2'	Report	Nombe 41'; Ray (yellow card) 47'; Dieng (yellow card) 59'	Stadium: Victoria Park; Attendance: 5,194; Referee: Leigh Doughty

2 October 2021 10	Exeter City	2–2	Walsall	Exeter
15:00 BST	Dieng 5', (yellow card) 59'; Jay (penalty missed) 49'; Nombe 61'	Report	Miller 37' (pen.), 70'; Ward (yellow card) 90'	Stadium: St James Park; Attendance: 4,839; Referee: Peter Wright

9 October 2021 11	Stevenage	2–2	Exeter City	Stevenage
15:00 BST	List 23', 59'; Taylor (yellow card) 57'; Cuthbert (yellow card) 66'	Report	Nombe 10'; Sweeney (yellow card) 29'; Hartridge (yellow card) 44'; Ray (yellow card) 47'; Jay 50'; Atangana (yellow card) 84'	Stadium: Lamex Stadium; Attendance: 3,186; Referee: Christopher Pollard

16 October 2021 12	Exeter City	2–2	Newport County	Exeter
15:00 BST	Daniel (yellow card) 5'; Jay 22'; Nombe 55'; Grounds (yellow card) 90+6'	Report	Willmott 12'; Baker-Richardson 28', (yellow card) 44'	Stadium: St James Park; Attendance: 5,078; Referee: Trevor Kettle

19 October 2021 13	Crawley Town	1–3	Exeter City	Crawley
19:45 BST	Nadesan (yellow card) 22' (yellow-red card) 43'; Appiah 31'; Hessenthaler (yellow card) 45+4'	Report	Atangana (yellow card) 45+4', (goal) 56'; Jay 54'; Nombe (yellow card) 83', (goal) 90'	Stadium: The People’s Pension Stadium; Attendance: 1,960; Referee: James Oldham

23 October 2021 14	Exeter City	2–1	Mansfield Town	Exeter
15:00 BST	Dieng 61'; Jay 83'	Report	Hawkins 50'; Lapslie (yellow card) 71'; Rawson (yellow card) 88'	Stadium: St James Park; Attendance: 4,329; Referee: Sam Purkiss

30 October 2021 15	Salford City	1–2	Exeter City	Salford
15:00 BST	Elliott 79'	Report	Key (yellow card) 29'; Dieng (yellow card) 43'; Jay 53'; Ripley 90+3' (o.g.)	Stadium: Peninsula Stadium; Attendance: 1,892; Referee: John Busby

13 November 2021 16	Exeter City	2–1	Oldham Athletic	Exeter
15:00 GMT	Jay 17'; J. Brown 50'; Key (yellow card) 64'; Sweeney (yellow card) 73'; Atangana (yellow card) 90+3'	Report	Bowden (yellow card) 24', (goal) 84'	Stadium: St James Park; Attendance: 5,103; Referee: Ollie Yates

20 November 2021 17	Exeter City	2–1	Carlisle United	Exeter
15:00 GMT	Nombe 60'; Caprice 80'	Report	Mellish (red card) 43'; Howard (yellow card) 60'; Gibson 83'	Stadium: St James Park; Attendance: 4,796; Referee: Will Finnie

23 November 2021 18	Colchester United	3–1	Exeter City	Colchester
19:45 GMT	Jasper 12'; Tchamadeu (yellow card) 23'; Chilvers 45+3', (yellow card) 90+4'; Sears 74'; Skuse (yellow card) 85'	Report	Amond 69'	Stadium: JobServe Community Stadium; Attendance: 2,028; Referee: Tom Nield

27 November 2021 19	Rochdale	1–1	Exeter City	Rochdale
15:00 GMT	Beesley (penalty missed) 32'; Taylor 69'	Report	Ray 59'; Sparkes (yellow card) 88'	Stadium: Crown Oil Arena; Attendance: 2,102; Referee: Andy Haines

7 December 2021 20	Exeter City	1–2	Northampton Town	Exeter
19:45 GMT	Amond 50'; Key (yellow card) 56'; Caprice (yellow card) 78'	Report	Sowerby 34'; McWilliams (yellow card) 35'; Guthrie (yellow card) 71'; Hoskins 74'	Stadium: St James Park; Attendance: 3,823; Referee: John Busby

11 December 2021 21	Exeter City	0–1	Tranmere Rovers	Exeter
15:00 GMT	Ray (yellow card) 72'	Report	Nevitt 17'; Jolley (yellow card) 65'; McManaman (red card)	Stadium: St James Park; Attendance: 4,850; Referee: Bobby Madley

18 December 2021 Postponed	Port Vale	v	Exeter City	Burslem
15:00 GMT				Stadium: Vale Park

26 December 2021 Postponed	Exeter City	v	Swindon Town	Exeter
15:00 GMT				Stadium: St James Park

1 January 2022 22	Sutton United	2–1	Exeter City	Sutton, London
15:00 GMT	Bugiel 8'; Barden (yellow card) 64'; Milsom 89' (pen.)	Report	Dieng 9'	Stadium: Borough Sports Ground; Attendance: 3,278; Referee: Alan Young

4 January 2022 23	Forest Green Rovers	0–0	Exeter City	Nailsworth
19:45 GMT	Cadden (yellow card) 32'; Wilson (yellow card) 53'; Stevenson (yellow card) 87'	Report	Collins (yellow card) 28'	Stadium: The Fully Charged New Lawn; Attendance: 2,631; Referee: Andy Davies

8 January 2022 Postponed	Exeter City	v	Harrogate Town	Exeter
15:00 GMT				Stadium: St James Park

15 January 2022 24	Exeter City	2–0	Scunthorpe United	Exeter
15:00 GMT	J. Brown 63'; Zanzala 76'	Report	Rowe (yellow card) 31'; Hackney (yellow card) 58'	Stadium: St James Park; Attendance: 4,676; Referee: Craig Hicks

22 January 2022 25	Walsall	0–2	Exeter City	Walsall
15:00 GMT	Menayese (yellow card) 45+3' (yellow-red card) 50'; White (yellow card) 76'	Report	Dieng 44'; Stubbs (yellow card) 46'; Diabate 84', (yellow card) 85'	Stadium: Banks's Stadium; Attendance: 4,750; Referee: Darren Handley

29 January 2022 26	Exeter City	0–0	Hartlepool United	Exeter
15:00 GMT	Stubbs (yellow card) 56'; Key (yellow card) 70'	Report	Ferguson (yellow card) 50'; Featherstone (red card) 53'	Stadium: St James Park; Attendance: 5,121; Referee: Tom Reeves

5 February 2022 27	Swindon Town	1–2	Exeter City	Swindon
15:00 GMT	Tomlinson 58'	Report	J. Brown 84'; Dieng 88'	Stadium: The Energy Check County Ground; Attendance: 10,642; Referee: Declan Bourne

8 February 2022 28	Exeter City	1–0	Leyton Orient	Exeter
19:45 GMT	Dieng (yellow card) 54'; J. Brown (yellow card) 81'; Diabate 90+2'	Report	Thompson (yellow card) 24'; Pratley (yellow card) 75'; Beckles (yellow card) 90+1'	Stadium: St James Park; Attendance: 4,111; Referee: Carl Brook

12 February 2022 29	Bradford City	0–1	Exeter City	Bradford
15:00 GMT	Sutton (yellow card) 43'; Watt (yellow card) 57'	Report	Caprice (yellow card) 38'; Phillips 44'	Stadium: Utilita Energy Stadium; Attendance: 15,058; Referee: Ross Joyce

15 February 2022 30	Exeter City	4–3	Harrogate Town	Exeter
19:45 GMT	J. Brown 37' (pen.); Grounds 71'; Dieng 81'; Sparkes 90+5'	Report	Armstrong 4', (yellow card) 86'; Muldoon 19'; Thomson 64'; Diamond (yellow card) 78'	Stadium: St James Park; Attendance: 3,852; Referee: Brett Huxtable

19 February 2022 Postponed	Exeter City	v	Barrow	Exeter
15:00 GMT				Stadium: St James Park

26 February 2022 31	Bristol Rovers	1–1	Exeter City	Bristol
15:00 GMT	Hoole 10'	Report	Brown 24'; Grounds (yellow card) 90'	Stadium: Memorial Stadium; Attendance: 9,689; Referee: Peter Wright

4 March 2022 32	Mansfield Town	2–1	Exeter City	Mansfield
19:45 GMT	Rawson 34'; Longstaff 67'	Report	Jay 90+5'	Stadium: One Call Stadium; Attendance: 6,702; Referee: Ollie Yates

8 March 2022 33	Exeter City	3–1	Swindon Town	Exeter
19:45 GMT	Brown 17'; Grounds 26'; Jay 81'	Report	Davison (yellow card) 25'; Iandolo (yellow card) 73'; Payne 90+4'	Stadium: St James Park; Attendance: 5,958; Referee: Robert Lewis

12 March 2022 34	Exeter City	0–0	Salford City	Exeter
15:00 GMT		Report	Turnbull (yellow card) 35'	Stadium: St James Park; Attendance: 5,775; Referee: Andy Woolmer

16 March 2022 35	Exeter City	2–1	Crawley Town	Exeter
19:45 GMT	Dieng 31', 44'	Report	Tsaroulla (yellow card) 26'; Appiah 45+6'; Tilley (yellow card) 79'	Stadium: St. James' Park; Attendance: 4,042; Referee: Ben Speedie

19 March 2022 36	Oldham Athletic	0–2	Exeter City	Oldham
15:00 GMT	Hart (yellow card) 45+1', (penalty missed) 73'; Clarke (yellow card) 63'	Report	Dieng (yellow card) 14'; Taylor 52'; Collins (yellow card) 69'; Atangana (yellow card) 71' (yellow-red card) 90+2'; Brown 90+6'	Stadium: Boundary Park; Attendance: 5,111; Referee: Seb Stockbridge

22 March 2022 37	Port Vale	0–0	Exeter City	Burslem
19:45 GMT		Report	Diabate (yellow card) 26'	Stadium: Vale Park; Attendance: 5,301; Referee: Bobby Madley

26 March 2022 38	Exeter City	2–1	Stevenage	Exeter
15:00 GMT	Stubbs 28', 44'; Key (yellow card) 69'; Sweeney (yellow card) 90'	Report	Cuthbert (yellow card) 18'; Norris 38'; Barry (yellow card) 90+4'	Stadium: St James Park; Attendance: 5,923; Referee: Carl Boyeson

2 April 2022 39	Newport County	0–1	Exeter City	Newport
15:00 BST	Demetriou (yellow card) 71'; Willmott (yellow card) 83'; Norman (yellow card) 90+4'	Report	Dieng 72'	Stadium: Rodney Parade; Attendance: 5,697; Referee: Chris Sarginson

9 April 2022 40	Carlisle United	0–1	Exeter City	Carlisle
15:00 BST	Gibson (yellow card) 19'; Mellish (yellow card) 48'; Dickenson (yellow card) 55'; Simeu (yellow card) 82'	Report	Amond 89'	Stadium: Brunton Park; Attendance: 5,132; Referee: Tom Nield

15 April 2022 41	Exeter City	2–0	Colchester United	Exeter
13:00 BST	Sparkes 32'; Zanzala 63'	Report	Coxe (yellow card) 66'	Stadium: St James Park; Attendance: 7,549; Referee: Will Finnie

18 April 2022 42	Tranmere Rovers	2–0	Exeter City	Birkenhead
15:00 BST	Davies (yellow card) 30'; Hawkes 39'; Nevitt (yellow card) 75', (goal) 81'	Report	Diabate (yellow card) 57'; Zanzala (yellow card) 70'	Stadium: Prenton Park; Attendance: 6,666; Referee: Darren Drysdale

23 April 2022 43	Exeter City	2–0	Rochdale	Exeter
15:00 BST	Dieng 34'; Zanzala (yellow card) 52'; Jay 60'; Brown (yellow card) 81'; Key (yellow card) 85'	Report	McNulty (yellow card) 51'; Taylor (yellow card) 75'	Stadium: St James Park; Attendance: 6,935; Referee: Carl Brook

26 April 2022 44	Exeter City	2–1	Barrow	Exeter
19:45 BST	Sweeney (yellow card) 31'; Phillips 35'; Jay 78'; J. Brown (yellow card) 87'	Report	Dawson 11' (o.g.); C. Brown (yellow card) 57'	Stadium: St James Park; Attendance: 7,860; Referee: Lee Swabey

30 April 2022 45	Northampton Town	1–1	Exeter City	Northampton
15:00 BST	Pinnock 29'; Guthrie (yellow card) 87'	Report	Dieng (yellow card) 20'; Sparkes (yellow card) 54'; Brown (yellow card) 68'; Nombe 71'; Collins (yellow card) 88'; Key (yellow card) 90+4'	Stadium: Sixfields Stadium; Attendance: 7,764; Referee: Simon Mather

7 May 2022 46	Exeter City	0–1	Port Vale	Exeter
15:00 BST	Stubbs (yellow card) 45+3'	Report	Wilson 36', (yellow card) 45+1'; Martin (yellow card) 43'; Stone (yellow card) 84'	Stadium: St James Park; Attendance: 8,147; Referee: Tom Reeves

=== FA Cup ===
Exeter City were drawn away to Bradford City in the first round and to Cambridge United in the second round.

6 November 2021 First round	Bradford City	1–1	Exeter City	Bradford
15:00 GMT	Robinson 28'; Sutton (yellow card) 30'	Report	Edwards (yellow card) 60'; Grounds (yellow card) 69'; Sweeney (yellow card) 81'; Nombe 86'	Stadium: Utilita Energy Stadium; Attendance: 3,236; Referee: Seb Stockbridge

16 November 2021 First round replay	Exeter City	Void (3–0) (a.e.t.)	Bradford City	Exeter
19:45 GMT	Daniel (yellow card) 70'; Hartridge (yellow card) 70'; Atangana (yellow card) 98', (goal) 105'; Jay 100', 115'; Key (yellow card) 101'	Report	Angol (yellow card) 70' (yellow-red card) 105+1'	Stadium: St James Park; Attendance: 3,509; Referee: David Rock

30 November 2021 First round replay	Exeter City	2–1	Bradford City	Exeter
19:45 GMT	Dieng 51'; Ray 80'	Report	Angol 11'; O'Connor (yellow card) 76'; Canavan (yellow card) 85'; Watt (yellow card) 90+1'	Stadium: St James Park; Attendance: 3,228; Referee: Charles Breakspear

4 December 2021 Second round	Cambridge United	2–1	Exeter City	Cambridge
15:00 GMT	Okedina (yellow card) 9'; May 23'; Knibbs 88'; Ironside (penalty missed) 90+9'	Report	Nombe 10' (pen.); Caprice (yellow card) 60'; Ray (yellow card) 82'; Dawson (yellow card) 88'; Collins (yellow card) 90+8'	Stadium: Abbey Stadium; Attendance: 2,834; Referee: David Rock

=== EFL Cup ===
Exeter were drawn at home to Wycombe Wanderers in the first round.

10 August 2021 First round	Exeter City	0–0 (3–4 p)	Wycombe Wanderers	Exeter
19:45 BST	Sparkes (yellow card) 79'	Report	Mehmeti (yellow card) 54'	Stadium: St James Park; Attendance: 2,555; Referee: David Rock
	Penalties
	Sparkes (penalty missed); Sweeney (penalty scored); Seymour (penalty scored); Brown (penalty scored); Grounds (penalty missed); Dodd (penalty missed)		Vokes (penalty missed); Horgan (penalty scored); Samuel (penalty missed); Mehmeti (penalty scored); Stockdale (penalty scored); Pendlebury (penalty scored)

=== EFL Trophy ===
Exeter were drawn into Southern Group E alongside Bristol Rovers, Chelsea U21s and Cheltenham Town.

Pos	Div	Team	Pld	W	PW	PL	L	GF	GA	GD	Pts	Qualification
1	L2	Exeter City	3	1	1	1	0	8	6	+2	6	Advance to Round 2
2	ACA	Chelsea U21	3	1	1	1	0	3	2	+1	6	Advance to Round 2
3	L2	Bristol Rovers	3	1	0	0	2	6	7	−1	3	
4	L1	Cheltenham Town	3	0	1	1	1	2	4	−2	3	

Source: EFL.com

24 August 2021 Group game 1	Exeter City	1–1 (3–4 p)	Chelsea U21	Exeter
19:00 BST	Lilley (yellow card) 80'; Jay 90+1' (pen.)	Report	Fiabema 45'	Stadium: St James Park; Attendance: 1,669; Referee: Robert Lewis
	Penalties
	Jay (penalty missed); Nombe (penalty scored); Brown (penalty scored); Seymour (penalty scored); Dodd (penalty missed)		Vale (penalty scored); Elliott (penalty scored); Nunn (penalty scored); Mbuyamba (penalty scored); Fiabema (penalty missed)

5 October 2021 Group game 2	Cheltenham Town	2–2 (2–3 p)	Exeter City	Cheltenham
19:00 BST	Chapman 37'; Miles 70'	Report	Daniel 8'; Collins 38'	Stadium: Jonny-Rocks Stadium; Attendance: 987; Referee: Craig Hicks
	Penalties
	Norton (penalty scored); Hussey (penalty scored); Freestone (penalty missed); Bonds (penalty missed); Vassell (penalty missed)		Amond (penalty missed); Sweeney (penalty scored); Cox (penalty missed); Caprice (penalty scored); Kite (penalty scored)

10 November 2021 Group game 3	Exeter City	5–3	Bristol Rovers	Exeter
19:00 GMT	Coley 2', 44'; Dieng 4'; Amond 12', 38'; Sweeney (yellow card) 76'; Daniel (yellow card) 90+2'	Report	Martinez (yellow card) 24'; Westbrooke 61'; Jones 72', (yellow card) 74'; Mbuenimo (yellow card) 81'; Anderton 88'	Stadium: St James Park; Attendance: 1,479; Referee: Chris Sarginson

7 January 2022 Second round	Exeter City	2–3	Portsmouth	Exeter
19:30 GMT	Jay 6'; Collins 76'	Report	Hirst 5'; Morrell (yellow card) 35'; Raggett (yellow card) 64'; Curtis 89', 90+3', (yellow card) 90+4'	Stadium: St James Park; Attendance: 2,146; Referee: Paul Howard

== Transfers ==
=== Transfers in ===
Date	Position	Nationality	Name	From	Fee	Ref.
8 June 2021	LM	(England)	Josh Coley	(England) Maidenhead United	Undisclosed	
1 July 2021	AM	(Jamaica)	Jevani Brown	(England) Colchester United	Free transfer	
1 July 2021	GK	(England)	Scott Brown	(England) Port Vale	Free transfer	(Note: Joined as a player/coach.)
1 July 2021	CB	(Wales)	George Ray	(England) Tranmere Rovers	Free transfer	
1 July 2021	RB	(England)	Callum Rowe	(England) Aston Villa	Free transfer	
5 July 2021	CF	(England)	Sam Nombe	(England) Milton Keynes Dons	Undisclosed	
8 July 2021	CB	(Republic of Ireland)	Pierce Sweeney	(England) Swindon Town	Free transfer	
20 July 2021	DM	(France)	Timothée Dieng	(England) Southend United	Free transfer	
26 July 2021	LB	(England)	Jonathan Grounds	(England) Swindon Town	Free transfer	
24 August 2021	LB	(England)	Colin Daniel	(England) Burton Albion	Free transfer	
31 August 2021	CM	(England)	Kyle Taylor	(England) Bournemouth	Undisclosed	
8 March 2022	FB	(England)	Aamir Daniels	Free agent	—N/a	

=== Loans in ===
Date from	Position	Nationality	Name	From	Date until	Ref.
29 July 2021	GK	(England)	Cameron Dawson	(England) Sheffield Wednesday	End of season	
10 August 2021	CF	(Republic of Ireland)	Pádraig Amond	(Wales) Newport County	End of season	
20 August 2021	RW	(England)	Owura Edwards	(England) Bristol City	14 January 2022 (Note: On 14 January, Edwards was recalled by parent club Bristol City.)	
10 January 2022	CF	(Republic of the Congo)	Offrande Zanzala	(England) Barrow	End of season	
31 January 2022	CF	(England)	Kieran Phillips	(England) Huddersfield Town	End of season	

=== Loans out ===
Date from	Position	Nationality	Name	To	Date until	Ref.
7 July 2021	GK	(England)	Jack Arthur	(England) Bideford	1 January 2022	
14 July 2021	CB	(England)	Cheick Diabate	(England) Truro City	1 January 2022	
9 August 2021	RB	(England)	Ellis Johnson	(England) Truro City	1 January 2022	
13 August 2021	AM	(England)	Jack Veale	(England) Taunton Town	January 2022	
17 September 2021	AM	(England)	James Dodd	(England) Weston-super-Mare	January 2022	
17 September 2021	LW	(England)	Nelson Iseguan	(England) Tiverton Town	October 2021	
30 September 2021	CB	(England)	Jordan Dyer	(England) Yeovil Town	October 2021	
30 September 2021	CF	(England)	Ben Seymour	(England) Yeovil Town	October 2021	
22 October 2021	GK	(England)	Harry Lee	(England) Dorchester Town	21 November 2021	
29 October 2021	CB	(England)	Jordan Dyer	(England) Bath City	End of season	
9 December 2021	LB	(England)	Jack Sparkes	(England) Torquay United	January 2022	
27 December 2021	GK	(England)	Harry Lee	(England) Dorchester Town	February 2022	
11 January 2022	AM	(England)	Jack Veale	(England) Poole Town	February 2022	
21 January 2022	CF	(England)	Sonny Cox	(England) Weston-super-Mare	End of season	
21 January 2022	CF	(England)	Ben Seymour	(England) Bath City	End of season	
26 January 2022	LB	(England)	Callum Rowe	(England) Bath City	End of season	
31 January 2022	CB	(Wales)	George Ray	(England) Leyton Orient	End of season	
26 February 2022	LB	(England)	Colin Daniel	(England) Aldershot Town	End of season	
1 March 2022	GK	(England)	Harry Lee	(England) Tavistock	29 March 2022	

=== Transfers out ===
Date	Position	Nationality	Name	To	Fee	Ref.
17 June 2021	CF	(England)	Ryan Bowman	(England) Shrewsbury Town	Undisclosed	
30 June 2021	CF	(England)	Nicky Ajose		Released	
30 June 2021	CB	(England)	Will Dean	(England) Truro City	Released	
30 June 2021	CF	(England)	Alex Fisher	(Wales) Newport County	Released	
30 June 2021	GK	(England)	Jonny Maxted	(England) Northampton Town	Released	
30 June 2021	CB	(Northern Ireland)	Rory McArdle	(England) Harrogate Town	Free transfer	
30 June 2021	CM	(England)	Louis Morison	(England) Tiverton Town	Released	
30 June 2021	LB	(England)	Lewis Page	(England) Harrogate Town	Free transfer	
30 June 2021	CB	(England)	Tom Parkes	(Scotland) Livingston	Released	
30 June 2021	LB	(England)	Noah Smerdon	(England) Weston-super-Mare	Released	
30 June 2021	CB	(Republic of Ireland)	Pierce Sweeney	(England) Swindon Town	Free transfer	
30 June 2021	CM	(Wales)	Jake Taylor	(England) Stevenage	Free transfer	
30 June 2021	GK	(England)	Lewis Ward	(England) Swindon Town	Released	
30 June 2021	RM	(England)	Randell Williams	(England) Hull City	Free transfer	
30 June 2021	CF	(England)	Lewis Wilson	(England) Bideford	Released	
3 August 2021	LW	(England)	Joel Randall	(England) Peterborough United	Undisclosed	
