= Jökull Andrésson =

Icelandic footballer

Personal information
- Date of birth: 25 August 2001 (age 25)
- Place of birth: Mosfellsbær, Iceland
- Height: 6 ft 4 in (1.93 m)
- Position: Goalkeeper

Team information
- Current team: FH
- Number: 1

Youth career
- –2017: Afturelding
- 2017–2018: Reading

Senior career*
Years	Team	Apps	(Gls)
2018–2024	Reading	0	(0)
2018	→ Hungerford Town (loan)	5	(0)
2020	→ Exeter City (loan)	6	(0)
2021	→ Morecambe (loan)	2	(0)
2021	→ Exeter City (loan)	23	(0)
2021–2022	→ Morecambe (loan)	13	(0)
2023	→ Exeter City (loan)	1	(0)
2023	→ Stevenage (loan)	3	(0)
2023–2024	→ Carlisle United (loan)	6	(0)
2024	→ Afturelding (loan)	11	(0)
2025	Afturelding	27	(0)
2026–	FH	27	(0)

International career^{‡}
2018	Iceland U17	1	(0)
2019	Iceland U19	4	(0)
2021	Iceland U21	2	(0)
2022	Iceland	1	(0)
- * Club domestic league appearances and goals as of 16 November 2026 ‡ National team caps and goals as of 22:18, 12 January 2022 (UTC)

Jökull Andrésson (born 25 August 2001) is an Icelandic professional footballer who plays as a goalkeeper for FH. Andrésson has also appeared for the Iceland national team.

== Club career ==
=== Reading ===
Jökull progressed through the Afturelding academy in his native Iceland before moving to English club Reading in 2017 to join his brother, Axel Óskar Andrésson, in their youth academy. Jökull had trained on and off with Reading since 2014. Jökull turned professional with Reading on his 17th birthday in August 2018, and spent the first half of the 2018–19 season on loan at Hungerford Town. One of Hungerford's games was abandoned after he suffered a concussion with 15 minutes of play remaining. He made five appearances for Hungerford before the loan was cancelled due to injury.

On 22 November 2019, Jökull signed a new contract with Reading, keeping him at the club until the summer of 2022.

==== Loans ====
Jökull signed for Exeter City on 27 October 2020 on an emergency 7 day loan following injuries to first-team goalkeepers Lewis Ward and Jonny Maxted. He made his debut that same day in a 1–1 draw away at Leyton Orient. After impressing Exeter manager Matt Taylor, Jökull extended his loan with Exeter City for an additional seven days on 2 November, 10 November, 17 November, and 24 November. He made his final appearance for Exeter in their FA Cup second-round victory over Gillingham, after which Maxted recovered from his injury and returned to the squad for their next game. He made 9 appearances in all competitions for Exeter.

On 22 January 2021 he joined League Two side Morecambe on a seven-day emergency loan deal. After facing Exeter City in his second and final game whilst on loan for Morecambe, Andrésson returned to Exeter City on loan for the remainder of the season on 29 January 2021.

On 23 July 2021, Jökull signed a new three-year contract with Reading, before returning to Morecambe on a season-long loan deal. On 10 January 2022, Jökull was recalled from his loan deal with Morecambe after making 17 appearances.

On 24 January 2023, Jökull returned to Exeter City on an emergency-loan deal. On 31 January he moved on loan to Stevenage.

On 10 August 2023, Jökull extended his contract with Reading until the summer of 2025, and signed for fellow League One club Carlisle United on a season-long loan.

On 19 July 2024, Reading announced that Jökull had joined Afturelding on loan until 31 October 2024. Following the end of his loan, Jökull left Reading by mutual consent on 4 November 2024.

=== Afturelding ===
On 7 December 2024, Afturelding announced the signing of Jökull and his brother Axel for the 2025 season.

== International career ==
Jökull has been capped by Iceland at under-17 and under-19 youth levels.

Jökull made his debut for Iceland U21 on 12 October 2021, in a 1–0 defeat to Portugal U21.

In January 2022, Jökull was called up to the Iceland national team for the first time for matches against Uganda and South Korea in Turkey. Jökull made his debut for Iceland on 12 January 2022, playing the first half in their 1–1 draw against Uganda.

== Personal life ==
His older brother is Axel Óskar Andrésson, who also played for Reading. Their father is strongman Andrés Guðmundsson.

== Career statistics ==
=== Club ===
As of match played 10 July 2026

Appearances and goals by club, season and competition
Club	Season	League			National Cup		League Cup		Other		Total	
Club	Season	Division	Apps	Goals	Apps	Goals	Apps	Goals	Apps	Goals	Apps	Goals
Reading	2018–19	Championship	0	0	0	0	0	0	—		0	0
Reading	2019–20	Championship	0	0	0	0	0	0	—		0	0
Reading	2020–21	Championship	0	0	0	0	0	0	—		0	0
Reading	2021–22	Championship	0	0	0	0	0	0	—		0	0
Reading	2022–23	Championship	0	0	0	0	0	0	—		0	0
Reading	2023–24	League One	0	0	0	0	0	0	0	0	0	0
Reading	Total		0	0	0	0	0	0	0	0	0	0
Hungerford Town (loan)	2018–19	National League South	5	0	0	0	—		0	0	5	0
Exeter City (loan)	2020–21	League Two	6	0	1	0	0	0	2 (Note: Appearances in the EFL Trophy)	0	9	0
Morecambe (loan)	2020–21	League Two	2	0	0	0	0	0	—		2	0
Exeter City (loan)	2020–21	League Two	23	0	0	0	0	0	—		23	0
Morecambe (loan)	2021–22	League One	13	0	1	0	2	0	1	0	17	0
Exeter City (loan)	2022–23	League One	1	0	0	0	0	0	—		1	0
Stevenage (loan)	2022–23	League Two	3	0	0	0	0	0	—		3	0
Carlisle United (loan)	2023–24	League One	6	0	0	0	0	0	1	0	7	0
Afturelding (loan)	2024	1. deild karla	8	0	0	0	0	0	3 (Note: Appearances in the 1. deild karla play-offs)	0	11	0
Afturelding	2025	Besta deild karla	27	0	1	0	4	0	—		32	0
FH	2026	Besta deild karla	13	0	2	0	0	0	—		15	0
Career total			107	0	5	0	6	0	7	0	125	0

=== International ===
As of matches played 12 January 2022

National team	Year	Apps	Goals
Iceland	2022	1	0
Total		1	0
