= Matt Jay =

English footballer

Personal information
- Full name: Matthew William Jay
- Date of birth: 27 February 1996 (age 30)
- Place of birth: Torbay, England
- Height: 5 ft 4 in (1.63 m)
- Position: Attacking midfielder

Team information
- Current team: Torquay United (player-head of youth)
- Number: 27

Youth career
- 2003–2013: Exeter City

Senior career*
Years	Team	Apps	(Gls)
2013–2023	Exeter City	163	(41)
2014–2015	→ Weston-super-Mare (loan)	5	(1)
2015	→ Hayes & Yeading United (loan)	6	(2)
2016	→ Truro City (loan)	20	(6)
2023–2025	Colchester United	35	(1)
2025–	Torquay United	40	(10)
- * Club domestic league appearances and goals as of 11:00, 30 December 2025 (UTC)

Matthew William Jay (born 27 February 1996) is an English professional footballer who plays as an attacking midfielder for National League South side Torquay United, where he also holds the role of Head of Youth.

== Early life and education ==
Jay was born in Torbay in Devon and he attended South Dartmoor Community College together with Ollie Watkins and Jamie Reid.

== Playing career ==
=== Exeter City ===
Jay made his professional debut for Exeter in a 2–0 loss to Wycombe Wanderers in the Football League Trophy at St James Park on 3 September 2013.

On 22 November 2015, Jay joined National League South side Hayes & Yeading United on a one-month loan.

He scored his first goal for Exeter in an EFL Trophy tie against Oxford United on 30 August 2016. Jay finally scored his first league goal on the 8th of April, in the 2017–18 campaign, away to Cambridge United in a game where Exeter came twice from behind to win 3–2. This came to the delight of many players and fans alike following a run of impressive games starting and from the bench.

In 2021, Jay scored his first career hat trick in a 4–0 victory against Leyton Orient. After a month in which he scored five goals and got one assist, Jay received the League Two Player of the Month award for March 2021. At the end of the 2020–21 season, he was named as the Devon side's Player of the Season, and on 29 April 2021 was named in the 2020–21 EFL League Two Team of the Season at the league's annual awards ceremony.

Jay was awarded the Exeter captaincy following the departure of Jake Taylor in the summer of 2021 and was given the number 7 shirt. He continued his goalscoring form into the 2021–22 season, netting 16 times in all competitions. The most significant of these came in a 2–1 home win over Barrow, where he scored a late winner, chesting the ball down from a Josh Key cross and slamming home through the legs of Paul Farman on the volley to secure his boyhood club's return to League One after a decade in League Two.

=== Colchester United ===
On 9 January 2023, Jay signed for Colchester United for an undisclosed fee.

On 23 January 2025, Colchester United announced that Jay's contract had been cancelled by mutual consent, with Jay free to seek another club as a free agent.

=== Torquay United ===
On 24 January 2025, Jay signed for National League South side Torquay United. In October 2026, he signed a new deal until 2028 with the club.

== Coaching career ==
On 13 October 2026, Jay was appointed Head of Youth at Torquay United.

== Career statistics ==
As of match played on 9 August 2025

Appearances and goals by club, season and competition
Club	Season	League			FA Cup		League Cup		Other		Total	
Club	Season	Division	Apps	Goals	Apps	Goals	Apps	Goals	Apps	Goals	Apps	Goals
Exeter City	2013–14	League Two	2	0	0	0	0	0	1 (Note: Appearance in Football League Trophy)	0	3	0
Exeter City	2014–15	League Two	3	0	0	0	0	0	0	0	3	0
Exeter City	2015–16	League Two	0	0	0	0	0	0	1	0	1	0
Exeter City	2016–17	League Two	2	0	0	0	0	0	3 (Note: Appearance(s) in EFL Trophy)	1	5	1
Exeter City	2017–18	League Two	17	1	1	0	1	0	4 (Note: Three appearances in EFL Trophy, one appearance in League Two play-offs)	0	23	1
Exeter City	2018–19	League Two	18	4	0	0	2	0	4	0	24	4
Exeter City	2019–20	League Two	14	4	2	0	1	0	6 (Note: Five appearances and four goals in EFL Trophy, one appearance in League Two play-offs)	4	23	8
Exeter City	2020–21	League Two	44	18	2	1	1	0	1	1	48	20
Exeter City	2021–22	League Two	45	14	3	0	1	0	2	2	51	16
Exeter City	2022–23	League One	18	0	2	1	2	1	3	2	25	4
Exeter City	Total		163	41	10	2	8	1	25	10	206	54
Weston-super-Mare (loan)	2014–15	Conference South	5	1	0	0	—		1 (Note: Appearance(s) in FA Trophy)	0	6	1
Hayes & Yeading United (loan)	2015–16	National League South	6	2	0	0	—		2	0	8	2
Truro City (loan)	2015–16	National League South	20	6	0	0	—		2 (Note: Appearances in the National League South play-offs)	0	22	6
Colchester United	2022–23	League Two	18	0	—		—		—		18	0
Colchester United	2023–24	League Two	17	1	0	0	0	0	3	0	20	1
Colchester United	2024–25	League Two	0	0	0	0	0	0	1	0	1	0
Colchester United	Total		35	1	0	0	0	0	4	0	39	1
Torquay United	2024–25	National League South	19	7	—		—		1 (Note: Appearance in National League South play-offs)	0	20	7
Torquay United	2025–26	National League South	1	0	0	0	—		0	0	1	0
Torquay United	Total		20	7	0	0	—		1	0	21	7
Career total			249	58	10	2	8	1	35	10	302	71

== Honours ==
Exeter City

- EFL League Two runner-up: 2021–22

Individual

- PFA Team of the Year: 2020–21 League Two, 2021–22 League Two
- EFL League Two Team of the Season: 2020–21
- Exeter City Player of the Season: 2020–21
- EFL League Two Player of the Month: March 2021
