= 2020–21 Exeter City F.C. season =

Exeter City
2020–21 season
- Chairman: Julian Tagg
- Manager: Matt Taylor
- Stadium: St James Park
- League Two: 9th
- FA Cup: Third round
- EFL Cup: First round
- EFL Trophy: Second round
- Top goalscorer: League: Matt Jay (18); All: Matt Jay (20)
Home colours	Away colours	Third colours

The 2020–21 Exeter City season was the club's 119th year in existence and their ninth consecutive season in League Two. They finished 9th in the league, failing to qualify for the play-offs on the final day. The club reached the third round of the FA Cup, losing to Championship side Sheffield Wednesday. City were eliminated in the first round of the EFL Cup by Bristol City, and were knocked out of the EFL Trophy in the second round by Northampton Town.

The season covers the period from 1 July 2020 to 30 June 2021.

== Review ==
=== September ===
A tough League Cup draw away to Bristol City began Exeter's season, and despite a strong showing a young and inexperienced side lost 2–0 to the Championship club. That result was quickly followed up by a 3–2 win against Forest Green Rovers in the EFL Trophy the following Tuesday, before City began their League season on Saturday 12 September.

Exeter's League Two season began in the worst possible fashion as they conceded a goal inside the first two minutes of their opening League game away to Salford City. However, the Grecians galvanised and a strong end to the first half saw them go 2–1 up thanks to goals from Matt Jay and Joel Randall, the latter's first league goal for the club. Ash Hunter equalised in the second half to deny City the win, but it was still a strong showing against one of the pre-season promotion favourites.

A home loss against Port Vale was followed by another strong away showing, this time beating Mansfield Town 2–1 with young full-back Josh Key scoring his first league goal for the club.

=== October ===
Unbeaten League Two leaders Cambridge United conceded their first league goal of the season at St James Park on October 3, as Matt Jay rolled home a penalty in the 16th minute. Joel Randall followed this up with another goal 18 minutes later, condemning the U's to their first league defeat of the season.

Harry Kite, Ben Seymour and Alex Hartridge all scored their first professional goals for the club against League One outfit Swindon Town in the EFL Trophy in a thrilling tie that finished 4–3 to City at the County Ground, before Alex Fisher produced a stunning top-corner curling shot in the last minute to save a point for the Grecians at Southend United.

After drawing 0–0 at Walsall, Jake Taylor and Ryan Bowman scored their first goals of the season against Crawley Town on 20 October, as their two late goals turned the game on its head to give City a 2–1 win. That was followed by another home win, this time a convincing 3–1 dismantling of Scunthorpe United. Between that Saturday and the following Tuesday both of City's first team goalkeepers, Lewis Ward and Jonny Maxted, suffered injuries and Exeter had to bring in Reading keeper Jökull Andrésson on a one-week emergency loan deal, ready to play against Leyton Orient and Carlisle United.

Andrésson only conceded once in his first two games as City drew 1–1 at Leyton Orient and then beat 10-man Carlisle United 1–0, with the 19-year-old keeper instantly winning over the belief and hearts of City fans on social media.

It was also at this time that City captain Jake Taylor got married, an event which coincided with his best run of goal scoring form in his career, as he scored four goals in five appearances in late October.

=== November ===
A frustrating 2–2 at Morecambe began the month, as the Grecians controlled the majority of possession throughout the match but could not find the breakthrough for the winning goal.

However, an FA Cup match at home to National League North side AFC Fylde saw the Grecians get back to winning ways as, despite an early scare with Fylde going in front in the 11th minute, goals from academy graduates Matt Jay and Alex Hartridge turned the game around before half time and City held on to this one-goal lead until the end of the match.

Another 2–2 away draw, this time at Bradford City, slowed down City's league progress but Exeter were still going strong in the cup, thrashing West Brom's under-21s 4–0 to secure a first-place finish in their EFL Trophy group. That form still couldn't be replicated in the league and an astonishing 40-yard free-kick from Oldham Athletic striker Danny Rowe gave the Latics three points at St James Park, and meant that the Grecians still had not won a League match in November, with it now being the 21st of the month.

That was all to change in spectacular style at home to Colchester United on Tuesday 24th, as a hattrick from Ryan Bowman, two Matt Jay goals and a strike from Joel Randall dismantled Colchester 6–1 in City's highest scoring win for over 20 years. That match fuelled City with confidence as they headed to League One side Gillingham for the second round of the FA Cup, and a masterclass in the middle of midfield from Nicky Law, who scored once and provided two assists for Joel Randall, helped Exeter to overcome the Gills 3–2 and secure a spot in the third round of the FA Cup for the third time in six seasons and the first time under Matt Taylor as manager. That match was the last of Jökull Andrésson's emergency loan as Exeter goalkeeper Jonny Maxted had fully recovered from his injury, ready to play against Grimsby Town.

=== December ===
Exeter carried their fantastic goalscoring form into December, ripping apart Grimsby Town 4–1 on the 1st of the month. This goalscoring run continued into the Grecians' first game of the season in front of fans, albeit Cheltenham Town fans at The Jonny-Rocks Stadium as the Government relaxed COVID-19 restrictions to allow home fans back into open-air stadiums in limited numbers. City and Cheltenham did not disappoint the fans, as they played out a thrilling match with the Robins emerging 5–3 victors.

A weakened City team were then knocked out of the EFL Trophy in the second round as they lost 2–1 to League One Northampton Town but this loss did not deter the Grecians' startling League form and another high-scoring victory at home, this time against Tranmere Rovers, wowed the St James Park crowd. Ryan Bowman scored another hattrick, Matt Jay netted a penalty, and Jake Taylor added another strike to the best goal-scoring return of his career to wipe away Tranmere 5–0 in one of the best attacking performances seen at Exeter City in years.

In the most frustrating of turnarounds, Exeter could not repeat the same level of attacking ability just three days later at home to lowly Harrogate Town, and the Sulphurites beat the Grecians 2–1 in the shock result of the evening.

With matches at Stevenage and Newport County being called off for COVID-19 cases and a waterlogged pitch respectively, City only played one more match in December, a boxing day draw at home with Forest Green Rovers that featured a stunning goal from Archie Collins, a drive from outside the box that rebounded off the cross bar before going in.

=== January ===
With City's game at Barrow on 2 January being called off due to a frozen pitch, Exeter had to wait until 9 January to play their first game of 2021, a home match in the third round of the FA Cup to Championship side Sheffield Wednesday. This was City's first game for two weeks but despite the extended break, they could not get the better of higher-league Wednesday and lost 2–0.

Exeter were quickly back in action in the league against former Premier League side Bolton Wanderers the following Tuesday, drawing 1–1 with the Trotters. Another away match, this time at Harrogate Town, was called off on 16 January due to an unplayable pitch, but the match was quickly rearranged for the 19th, and despite constant heavy rain in North Yorkshire the groundsmen at Harrogate managed to keep the rearranged fixture on. City struggled in their first away fixture for 45 days and couldn't break down a resilient Town so had to settle for a 0–0 draw.

Matt Taylor made his first signing of the transfer window on 21 January, announcing that central defender Sam Stubbs had moved to the club from Fleetwood Town on a free transfer. The announcement of Stubbs' signing had been due a few weeks before this date, but he tested positive for COVID-19 so there had to be some delay in confirming this transfer. Stubbs also moved to the Grecians on the back of a long injury lay-off at Fleetwood and Matt Taylor confirmed that he wouldn't be featuring in the Grecians' first team for a few weeks as he recovered back to full fitness.

A lack of goals in the team that scored so many was beginning to become a concern, but a 3–1 win over relegation-threatened Stevenage on 23 January helped dampen those fears, with Archie Collins opening the scoring with another thunderous shot into the same top corner as the goal he scored against Forest Green Rovers a month before.

The good feeling generated by that win was quickly shot though as the Grecians finished the month with back-to-back defeats to fellow promotion hopefuls Morecambe and Carlisle United, losing 2–0 and 1–0 respectively.

Between those two defeats first team goalkeeper Lewis Ward left the club on loan, joining League One club Portsmouth. Ward hadn't been playing since his return from injury for the Grecians and had been on the bench behind Jonny Maxted, and so when the opportunity to move to a higher league club had presented itself, he requested that the move go through as soon as possible. Reading stopper Jökull Andrésson was brought back to the club, this time on a six-month loan deal until the end of the season as Ward's replacement, and he made his second debut for the Grecians away at Carlisle.

=== February ===
February 1 was the January transfer window deadline day, and City made a single signing, bringing in experienced Newport County winger Robbie Willmott on loan until the end of the season. Willmott made his debut the following day as a substitute away at Stevenage, with City facing the Hertfordshire club for the second time in just ten days due to games having to be rearranged because of COVID-19 cases at various clubs. Rory McArdle's first goal for the club, a glancing header from a freekick, secured a 1–0 win for City against the relegation-threatened club.

An in-form Bradford City visited St James Park on 6 February and despite Exeter's early dominance, the Bantams went into the half-time break 2–1 up due to defensive mistakes by the Grecians. This was turned around in the second half though, and thanks to Bowman's stooping header and Jay's slow penalty, the game was turned on its head and City won the three points.

Two more back-to-back away games at Barrow and Oldham Athletic were postponed as a cold spell hit most of the UK, with the Exeter squad actually arriving at Barrow's ground before the game was called off.

These postponed games gave City a rest before they played fellow promotion challengers Newport County at Rodney Parade for the rearranged fixture on Tuesday 16. Exeter made a poor start to the game with defender Alex Hartridge sent off after nine minutes for denying an obvious goal scoring opportunity. Despite having one man less than their opponents, Exeter still opened the scoring through Ryan Bowman. Just before half-time, the situation went from bad to worse, as Exeter were reduced to nine men with Bowman also receiving a straight red for elbowing an opponent. Against all the odds, nine man Exeter managed to hold Newport back until the 88th minute, and even then County could only score once and City escaped with a point.

Exeter's squad were given another rest after their match at Newport as the following Saturday's game against Grimsby Town was called off due to a waterlogged pitch, the first home game of the season to fall foul of the weather.

Then, Robbie Willmott scored his first City goal and Ben Seymour scored his first league goal in a 2–1 win against Colchester United, before City ended the month on a less positive note, losing at Crawley Town, with former City striker Tom Nichols scoring against the Grecians and Tom Parkes being shown City's third straight red card of the month.

=== March ===
City began the month with an uninspiring 0–0 draw with Walsall at home. After two drab games against Crawley and Walsall, City returned to winning ways against Leyton Orient on Saturday 6th, with first half goals from Joel Randall and Matt Jay (twice) putting the Grecians in a comfortable 3–0 lead at half-time. It took Jay just five minutes into the second half to complete his first ever professional hattrick, coolly slotting home a penalty to secure a 4–0 win for Exeter. Jay continued this form into the following Tuesday when he scored a superb free-kick at Scunthorpe United, with Jack Sparkes netting his first league goal for the club to confirm City's first back-to-back wins since early February.

However, the Grecians couldn't turn this form into their first three consecutive league wins of the season when table-topping Cheltenham Town visited St James Park as, despite a strong performance from the Grecians, a last-minute headed goal from Andy Williams stole the three points for the Robins at the death. A trip to high-flying Tranmere Rovers followed the next weekend, and another defeat was compounded by the fact both of Tranmere's goals were scored from the penalty spot and Joel Randall suffered a season-ending injury while scoring City's equaliser.

Exeter dominated in their next game at Oldham Athletic, having the majority of the ball and three times as many shots as their opponents, but two opportunistic goals and a lack of luck on City's behalf condemned the Grecians to three defeats in a row for the first time this season.

On Saturday 27th against Salford City, in the Manchester club's first ever visit to St James Park, Exeter City had only one shot on target but that was all the Grecians needed for a hard-fought 1–0 win against their fellow play-off rivals thanks to Matt Jay's 16th goal of the season.

== Transfers ==
=== Transfers in ===
Date	Position	Nationality	Name	From	Fee	Ref.
6 August 2020	RB	(England)	Jake Caprice	(England) Tranmere Rovers	Free transfer	
6 August 2020	CB	(Northern Ireland)	Rory McArdle	(England) Scunthorpe United	Free transfer	
1 September 2020	LB	(England)	Lewis Page	(England) Charlton Athletic	Free transfer	
21 January 2021	CB	(England)	Sam Stubbs	(England) Fleetwood Town	Free transfer	

=== Loans in ===
Date from	Position	Nationality	Name	From	Date until	Ref.
27 October 2020	GK	(Iceland)	Jökull Andrésson	(England) Reading	28 November 2020	
29 January 2021	GK	(Iceland)	Jökull Andrésson	(England) Reading	End of season	
1 February 2021	RM	(England)	Robbie Willmott	(Wales) Newport County	End of season	

=== Loans out ===
Date from	Position	Nationality	Name	To	Date until	Ref.
4 August 2020	CB	(England)	Cheick Diabate	(England) Bideford	7 October 2020 (Note: Loan cut short to join Tiverton on loan.)	
4 August 2020	CF	(England)	Lewis Wilson	(England) Bideford	1 January 2021	
18 September 2020	CM	(England)	Louis Morison	(England) Tiverton Town	1 January 2021	
7 October 2020	CB	(England)	Cheick Diabate	(England) Tiverton Town	1 January 2021	
8 October 2020	CB	(England)	Jordan Dyer	(England) Chippenham Town	November 2020	
8 October 2020	LB	(England)	Noah Smerdon	(England) Chippenham Town	November 2020	
20 November 2020	CB	(England)	Will Dean	(England) Bath City	December 2020	
28 January 2021	GK	(England)	Lewis Ward	(England) Portsmouth	End of season	

=== Transfers out ===
Date	Position	Nationality	Name	To	Fee	Ref.
1 July 2020	MF	(England)	Brennan Dickenson	(England) Carlisle United	Released	
1 July 2020	MF	(England)	Lee Holmes	Unattached	Released	
1 July 2020	DF	(England)	Aaron Martin	(Scotland) Hamilton Academical	Released	
1 July 2020	MF	(England)	Lee Martin	(England) Ebbsfleet United	Released	
1 July 2020	DF	(England)	Dean Moxey	(England) Torquay United	Released	
1 July 2020	GK	(Northern Ireland)	Jared Thompson	(England) Brentford	Released	
1 July 2020	DF	(England)	Gary Warren	(England) Torquay United	Released	
1 July 2020	DF	(England)	Craig Woodman	(England) Tiverton Town	Released	
19 August 2020	CM	(England)	Ben Chrisene	(England) Aston Villa	Undisclosed	
31 January 2021	CM	(England)	Nicky Law	(United States) Indy Eleven	Undisclosed	

== Pre-season ==
The Grecians announced they would play four pre-season friendlies against Bristol Rovers, Taunton Town, Tiverton Town and Truro City. Fans were only permitted to attend the Tiverton Town match.

15 August 2020 Friendly	Bristol Rovers	2–1	Exeter City	Horfield
14:00 BST	Mitchell-Lawson 1'; Hargreaves 46'	Report	Parkes 49'	Stadium: Memorial Stadium; Attendance: 0

21 August 2020 Friendly	Exeter City	1–1	Taunton Town	Clyst St Mary
18:00 BST	Fisher 75'	Report	Holmes 11'	Stadium: Cliff Hill Training Ground; Attendance: 0

25 August 2020 Friendly	Tiverton Town	1–2	Exeter City	Tiverton
19:30 BST	Lewington	Report	Jay; Dean	Stadium: Ladysmead; Attendance: 300

28 August 2020 Friendly	Exeter City	3−2	Truro City	Clyst St Mary
18:00 BST	Jay 18'; Bowman 50', 89'		Harvey 33', 77'	Stadium: Cliff Hill Training Ground; Attendance: 0

== Competitions ==
=== EFL League Two ===
==== League table ====
Pos	Team	Pld	W	D	L	GF	GA	GD	Pts	Promotion, qualification or relegation
5	Newport County	46	20	13	13	57	42	+15	73	Qualification for League Two play-offs
6	Forest Green Rovers	46	20	13	13	59	51	+8	73	Qualification for League Two play-offs
7	Tranmere Rovers	46	20	13	13	55	50	+5	73	Qualification for League Two play-offs
8	Salford City	46	19	14	13	54	34	+20	71	
9	Exeter City	46	18	16	12	71	50	+21	70	
10	Carlisle United	46	18	12	16	60	51	+9	66	
11	Leyton Orient	46	17	10	19	53	55	−2	61	
12	Crawley Town	46	16	13	17	56	62	−6	61	
13	Port Vale	46	17	9	20	57	57	0	60	

Updated to match(es) played on 31 May 2021. Source: EFL Official Website
Rules for classification: 1) Points; 2) Goal difference; 3) Number of goals scored; 4) Head-to-head results; 5) Wins; 6) Away goals; 7) Penalty points (sec 9.5); 8) 12-point sending off offences

==== Results summary ====
Overall								Home						Away					
Pld	W	D	L	GF	GA	GD	Pts	W	D	L	GF	GA	GD	W	D	L	GF	GA	GD
46	18	16	12	71	50	+21	70	11	7	5	38	20	+18	7	9	7	33	30	+3

Last updated: 8 May 2021.
Source: BBC

==== Results by matchday ====
Matchday	1	2	3	4	5	6	7	8	9	10	11	12	13	14	15	16	17	18	19	20	21	22	23	24	25	26	27	28	29	30	31	32	33	34	35	36	37	38	39	40	41	42	43	44	45	46
Ground	A	H	A	H	A	A	H	H	A	H	A	A	H	H	A	A	H	H	H	H	A	H	H	A	A	H	A	A	A	H	H	A	H	A	A	H	A	H	A	A	H	A	H	H	A	H
Result	D	L	W	W	D	D	W	W	D	W	D	D	L	W	W	L	W	L	D	D	D	W	L	L	W	W	D	W	L	D	W	W	L	L	L	W	L	D	W	L	D	D	D	W	W	D
Position	8	19	15	6	8	12	9	5	6	4	4	4	6	5	3	5	5	5	7	10	10	8	9	9	8	5	7	6	8	9	8	8	8	8	8	8	8	8	8	8	8	8	9	9	8	9

Updated to match(es) played on 8 May 2021. Source: 11v11 for league tables and fixtures
A = Away; H = Home; W = Win; D = Draw; L = Loss

==== Matches ====
Win Draw Loss Postponed

The 2020–21 season fixtures were released on 21 August 2020.

12 September 2020 1	Salford City	2–2	Exeter City	Salford
15:00 BST	Henderson 2'; Hunter 69'	Report	Jay 22'; Randall 34'	Stadium: The Peninsula Stadium; Attendance: 0 Referee: Sam Barrott

19 September 2020 2	Exeter City	0–2	Port Vale	Exeter
15:00 BST		Report	Conlon 21'; Rodney 72'	Stadium: St James Park; Attendance: 0 Referee: Sam Burkiss

26 September 2020 3	Mansfield Town	1–2	Exeter City	Mansfield
15:00 BST	Menayese 20'	Report	Rawson 40' (o.g.); Key 76'	Stadium: Field Mill; Attendance: 0 Referee: Christopher Pollard

3 October 2020 4	Exeter City	2–0	Cambridge United	Exeter
15:00 BST	Jay 16' (pen.); Randall 34'	Report		Stadium: St James Park; Attendance: 0 Referee: Neil Hair

10 October 2020 5	Southend United	2–2	Exeter City	Southend-on-sea
15:00 BST	Goodship 26'; Demetriou 65' (pen.)	Report	Randall 40'; Fisher 90+5'	Stadium: Roots Hall; Attendance: 0 Referee: Kevin Johnson

17 October 2020 6	Walsall	0–0	Exeter City	Bescot
15:00 BST		Report		Stadium: Banks's Stadium; Attendance: 0 Referee: Ben Speedie

20 October 2020 7	Exeter City	2–1	Crawley Town	Exeter
19:00 BST	Taylor 77'; Bowman 84'	Report	Watters 40'	Stadium: St James Park; Attendance: 0 Referee: Will Finnie

24 October 2020 8	Exeter City	3–1	Scunthorpe United	Exeter
13:00 BST	Randall 36'; Jay 39'; Taylor 89'	Report	Rowe 48'	Stadium: St James Park; Attendance: 0 Referee: David Rock

27 October 2020 9	Leyton Orient	1–1	Exeter City	Leyton
19:00 GMT	Wilkinson 4'	Report	Taylor 47'	Stadium: Brisbane Road; Attendance: 0 Referee: Robert Lewis

31 October 2020 10	Exeter City	1–0	Carlisle United	Exeter
13:00 GMT	Parkes 48'	Report		Stadium: St James Park; Attendance: 0 Referee: James Adcock

3 November 2020 11	Morecambe	2–2	Exeter City	Morecambe
18:30 GMT	Mendes Gomes 41'; Hendrie 45+1'	Report	Randall 33'; Taylor 72'	Stadium: Globe Arena; Attendance: 0 Referee: Ollie Yates

14 November 2020 12	Bradford City	2–2	Exeter City	Bradford
15:00 GMT	Clarke 10'; Staunton 45+1'	Report	Jay 20'; Bowman 27'	Stadium: Valley Parade; Attendance: 0 Referee: James Bell

21 November 2020 13	Exeter City	1–2	Oldham Athletic	Exeter
15:00 GMT	Williams 12'	Report	Blackwood 21'; Rowe 32'	Stadium: St James Park; Attendance: 0 Referee: Steve Martin

24 November 2020 14	Exeter City	6–1	Colchester United	Exeter
19:00 GMT	Jay 20', 90+5'; Randall 53'; Bowman 57', 71', 90+3'	Report	Folivi 73'	Stadium: St James Park; Attendance: 0 Referee: Trevor Kettle

1 December 2020 15	Grimsby Town	1–4	Exeter City	Cleethorpes
19:00 GMT	Hendrie 31'	Report	Bowman 20'; Williams 40', 44'; Jay 68'	Stadium: Blundell Park; Attendance: 0 Referee: Andy Haines

5 December 2020 16	Cheltenham Town	5–3	Exeter City	Cheltenham
15:00 GMT	Lloyd 7'; May 13'; Sercombe 45+3' (pen.); A. Williams 77'; Boyle 90+1'	Report	Collins 4'; Jay 56'; Law 88'	Stadium: Whaddon Road; Attendance: 2,000; Referee: Bobby Madley

12 December 2020 17	Exeter City	5–0	Tranmere Rovers	Exeter
15:00 GMT	Bowman 8', 27', 77'; Jay 18' (pen.); Taylor 73'	Report		Stadium: St James Park; Attendance: 1,630; Referee: Kevin Johnson

15 December 2020 18	Exeter City	1–2	Harrogate Town	Exeter
19:45 GMT	Taylor 46'	Report	Kiernan 31'; Muldoon 75'	Stadium: St James Park; Attendance: 1,559; Referee: Lee Swabey

19 December 2020 Postponed	Stevenage	P–P	Exeter City	Stevenage
15:00 GMT				Stadium: Broadhall Way

26 December 2020 19	Exeter City	1–1	Forest Green Rovers	Exeter
13:00 GMT	Archie Collins 37'	Report	Aaron Collins 16'	Stadium: St James Park; Attendance: 1,767; Referee: Brett Huxtable

29 December 2020 Postponed	Newport County	P–P	Exeter City	Newport, Wales
19:00 GMT				Stadium: Rodney Parade; Referee: John Busby

2 January 2021 Postponed	Barrow	P–P	Exeter City	Barrow-in-Furness
15:00 GMT				Stadium: Holker Street

12 January 2021 20	Exeter City	1–1	Bolton Wanderers	Exeter
17:00 GMT	Almeida Santos 62' (o.g.)	Report	Ghahoua 73'	Stadium: St James Park; Attendance: 0 Referee: Sam Allison

16 January 2021 Postponed	Harrogate Town	P–P	Exeter City	Harrogate
15:00 GMT				Stadium: Wetherby Road

19 January 2021 21	Harrogate Town	0–0	Exeter City	Harrogate
19:00 GMT		Report		Stadium: Wetherby Road; Attendance: 0 Referee: Thomas Bramall

23 January 2021 22	Exeter City	3–1	Stevenage	Exeter
13:00 GMT	Collins 10'; Jay 79'; Bowman 85'	Report	List 81'	Stadium: St James Park; Attendance: 0 Referee: Matt Donohue

26 January 2021 23	Exeter City	0–2	Morecambe	Exeter
18:00 GMT		Report	Phillips 9' (pen.); Stockton 66'	Stadium: St James Park; Attendance: 0 Referee: Craig Hicks

30 January 2021 24	Carlisle United	1–0	Exeter City	Carlisle
13:00 GMT	Alessandra 9'	Report		Stadium: Brunton Park; Attendance: 0 Referee: Martin Coy

2 February 2021 25	Stevenage	0–1	Exeter City	Stevenage
19:00 GMT		Report	McArdle 28'	Stadium: Broadhall Way; Attendance: 0 Referee: Graham Salisbury

6 February 2021 26	Exeter City	3–2	Bradford City	Exeter
13:00 GMT	Sweeney 42'; Bowman 61'; Jay 79' (pen.)	Report	Vernam 17'; Crankshaw 45'	Stadium: St James Park; Attendance: 0 Referee: Ben Speedie

9 February 2021 Postponed	Barrow	P–P	Exeter City	Barrow-in-Furness
18:30 GMT				Stadium: Holker Street

13 February 2021 Postponed	Oldham Athletic	P–P	Exeter City	Oldham
15:00 GMT				Stadium: Boundary Park

16 February 2021 27	Newport County	1–1	Exeter City	Newport, Wales
19:00 GMT	Telford 88'	Report	Bowman 22'	Stadium: Rodney Parade; Attendance: 0 Referee: Tom Nield

20 February 2021 Postponed	Exeter City	P–P	Grimsby Town	Exeter
13:00 GMT				Stadium: St James Park

23 February 2021 28	Colchester United	1–2	Exeter City	Colchester
19:00 GMT	Oteh 66'	Report	Willmott 27'; Seymour 64'	Stadium: Colchester Community Stadium; Attendance: 0 Referee: Will Finnie

27 February 2021 29	Crawley Town	2–0	Exeter City	Crawley
13:00 GMT	Nichols 62' (pen.); Nadesan 83'	Report		Stadium: The People's Pension Stadium; Attendance: 0 Referee: Declan Bourne

2 March 2021 30	Exeter City	0–0	Walsall	Exeter
19:00 GMT		Report		Stadium: St James Park; Attendance: 0 Referee: John Busby

6 March 2021 31	Exeter City	4–0	Leyton Orient	Exeter
13:00 GMT	Randall 11'; Jay 13', 42', 50' (pen.)	Report		Stadium: St James Park; Attendance: 0 Referee: Charles Breakspear

9 March 2021 32	Scunthorpe United	0–2	Exeter City	Scunthorpe
19:00 GMT		Report	Jay 11'; Sparkes 89'	Stadium: Glanford Park; Attendance: 0 Referee: Seb Stockbridge

13 March 2021 33	Exeter City	0–1	Cheltenham Town	Exeter
15:00 GMT		Report	A. Williams 90+1'	Stadium: St James Park; Attendance: 0 Referee: Josh Smith

20 March 2021 34	Tranmere Rovers	2–1	Exeter City	Birkenhead
15:00 GMT	Nugent 18' (pen.); Lloyd 68' (pen.)	Report	Randall 20'	Stadium: Prenton Park; Attendance: 0 Referee: Paul Howard

23 March 2021 35	Oldham Athletic	2–1	Exeter City	Oldham
19:00 GMT	Jameson 35'; McCalmont 55'	Report	Sparkes 67'	Stadium: Boundary Park; Attendance: 0 Referee: Sam Purkiss

27 March 2021 36	Exeter City	1–0	Salford City	Exeter
13:00 GMT	Jay 34'	Report		Stadium: St James Park; Attendance: 0 Referee: Antony Coggins

2 April 2021 37	Port Vale	1–0	Exeter City	Burslem
15:00 BST	Robinson 2'	Report		Stadium: Vale Park; Attendance: 0 Referee: Leigh Doughty

5 April 2021 38	Exeter City	0–0	Mansfield Town	Exeter
13:00 BST		Report		Stadium: St James Park; Attendance: 0 Referee: Carl Brook

10 April 2021 39	Cambridge United	1–4	Exeter City	Cambridge
15:00 BST	Ironside 55'	Report	Bowman 3'; Sparkes 15'; Collins 67'; Jay 80'	Stadium: Abbey Stadium; Attendance: 0 Referee: Kevin Johnson

13 April 2021 40	Barrow	2–1	Exeter City	Barrow-in-Furness
19:00 BST	Brough 45+2'; Quigley 90+1'	Report	Sweeney 90+4'	Stadium: Holker Street; Attendance: 0 Referee: Ross Joyce

17 April 2021 41	Exeter City	0–0	Southend United	Exeter
12:30 BST		Report		Stadium: St James Park; Attendance: 0 Referee: Darren Drysdale

20 April 2021 42	Forest Green Rovers	0–0	Exeter City	Nailsworth
19:00 BST		Report		Stadium: The New Lawn; Attendance: 0 Referee: Bobby Madley

24 April 2021 43	Exeter City	0–0	Newport County	Exeter
15:00 BST		Report		Stadium: St James Park; Attendance: 0 Referee: Robert Lewis

27 April 2021 44	Exeter City	3–2	Grimsby Town	Exeter
19:00 BST	Waterfall 33' (o.g.); Fisher 83'; Bowman 89'	Report	John-Lewis 41' (pen.); Matete 58'	Stadium: St James Park; Attendance: 0 Referee: David Rock

1 May 2021 45	Bolton Wanderers	1–2	Exeter City	Horwich
19:00 BST	Jones 15'	Report	R. Williams 49'; Sweeney 90+6'	Stadium: University of Bolton Stadium; Attendance: 0 Referee: Anthony Backhouse

8 May 2021 46	Exeter City	1–1	Barrow	Exeter
15:00 BST	Jay 25'	Report	Beadling 56'	Stadium: St James Park; Attendance: 0 Referee: Ben Toner

=== FA Cup ===
The draw for the first round was made on Monday 26, October. The second round draw was revealed on Monday, 9 November by Danny Cowley. The draw for the third round was made by Robbie Savage.

Win Draw Loss

7 November 2020 First round	Exeter City	2–1	AFC Fylde	Exeter
13:00 GMT	Jay 26'; Hartridge 33'	Report	Hulme 11'	Stadium: St James Park; Attendance: 0 Referee: Tom Reeves

28 November 2020 Second round	Gillingham	2–3	Exeter City	Gillingham
13:00 GMT	Oliver 21'; Samuel 80'	Report	Law 29'; Randall 35', 40'	Stadium: Priestfield Stadium; Attendance: 0 Referee: Alan Young

9 January 2021 Third round	Exeter City	0–2	Sheffield Wednesday	Exeter
15:00 GMT		Report	Reach 27'; Paterson 90'	Stadium: St James Park; Attendance: 0 Referee: Dean Whitestone

=== EFL Cup ===
Win Draw Loss

The first round draw was made on 18 August, live on Sky Sports, by Paul Merson.

5 September 2020 First round	Bristol City	2–0	Exeter City	Ashton Gate
14:00 BST	Paterson 35'; Semenyo 83'	Report		Stadium: Ashton Gate Stadium; Attendance: 0 Referee: Chris Sarginson

=== EFL Trophy ===
Win Draw Loss

The regional group stage draw was confirmed on 18 August. The second round draw was made by Matt Murray on 20 November, at St Andrew's.

Pos	Div	Team	Pld	W	PW	PL	L	GF	GA	GD	Pts	Qualification
1	L2	Exeter City	3	3	0	0	0	11	5	+6	9	Advance to Round 2
2	L2	Forest Green Rovers	3	1	0	0	2	5	4	+1	3	Advance to Round 2
3	L1	Swindon Town	3	1	0	0	2	6	7	−1	3	
4	ACA	West Bromwich Albion U21	3	1	0	0	2	3	9	−6	3	

Source: EFL.com

==== Group stage ====
8 September 2020 First round	Exeter City	3–2	Forest Green Rovers	Exeter
17:30 BST	Ajose 45'; Jay 57'; Key 67'	Report	Stevens 5', 51'	Stadium: St James Park; Attendance: 0 Referee: Sam Allison

6 October 2020 First round	Swindon Town	3–4	Exeter City	Swindon
19:00 BST	Smith 61', 85'; Palmer 90+3'	Report	Kite 4'; Seymour 7' (pen.); Atangana 63'; Hartridge 68'	Stadium: County Ground; Attendance: 0 Referee: Craig Hicks

17 November 2020 Group stage	Exeter City	4–0	West Bromwich Albion U21	Exeter
19:00 GMT	Kite 27'; Seymour 48'; Sparkes 60'; Law 84'	Report		Stadium: St James Park; Attendance: 0 Referee: Paul Howard

==== Knock-out stage ====
8 December 2020 Second round	Exeter City	1–2	Northampton Town	Exeter
19:00 GMT	Atangana 51'	Report	Rose 22'; Ashley-Seal 82'	Stadium: St James Park; Attendance: 714; Referee: Carl Brook

== Statistics ==
No.	Pos	Nat	Player	Total		League Two		FA Cup		League Cup		League Trophy	
No.	Pos	Nat	Player	Apps	Goals	Apps	Goals	Apps	Goals	Apps	Goals	Apps	Goals
2	DF	(England) ENG	Jake Caprice	39	0	13+21	0	2+0	0	0+0	0	3+0	0
3	MF	(England) ENG	Jack Sparkes	50	4	28+14	3	2+1	0	0+1	0	4+0	1
4	MF	(France) FRA	Nigel Atangana	33	2	11+17	0	1+1	0	1+0	0	2+0	2
6	DF	(Northern Ireland) NIR	Rory McArdle	27	1	18+3	1	3+0	0	1+0	0	2+0	0
8	MF	(Wales) WAL	Jake Taylor	50	6	40+4	6	1+2	0	0+1	0	1+1	0
9	FW	(England) ENG	Ben Seymour	39	3	8+25	1	1+1	0	0+1	0	3+0	2
10	MF	(England) ENG	Archie Collins	49	4	46+0	4	2+0	0	1+0	0	0+0	0
11	MF	(England) ENG	Randell Williams	31	4	24+5	4	1+0	0	1+0	0	0+0	0
12	FW	(England) ENG	Ryan Bowman	47	14	39+3	14	3+0	0	1+0	0	1+0	0
14	MF	(England) ENG	Joel Randall	36	10	26+4	8	2+1	2	1+0	0	0+2	0
15	DF	(England) ENG	Tom Parkes	33	1	28+3	1	1+0	0	0+0	0	1+0	0
16	MF	(England) ENG	Robbie Willmott	17	1	13+4	1	0+0	0	0+0	0	0+0	0
17	FW	(England) ENG	Matt Jay	48	20	43+1	18	2+0	1	1+0	0	1+0	1
18	FW	(England) ENG	Alex Fisher	20	2	3+15	2	0+0	0	0+0	0	2+0	0
20	DF	(England) ENG	Lewis Page	35	0	26+6	0	2+0	0	1+0	0	0+0	0
23	GK	(England) ENG	Jonny Maxted	12	0	9+0	0	0+0	0	0+0	0	3+0	0
24	GK	(Iceland) ISL	Jökull Andrésson	32	0	29+0	0	2+0	0	0+0	0	1+0	0
25	FW	(England) ENG	Nicky Ajose	9	1	0+4	0	0+1	0	0+0	0	3+1	1
26	DF	(Republic of Ireland) IRL	Pierce Sweeney	42	3	32+6	3	1+1	0	0+0	0	1+1	0
29	MF	(England) ENG	Harry Kite	9	2	1+3	0	1+0	0	0+0	0	4+0	2
30	DF	(England) ENG	Joshua Key	48	2	36+7	1	2+1	0	1+0	0	1+0	1
31	DF	(England) ENG	Jordan Dyer	4	0	0+1	0	0+0	0	0+0	0	2+1	0
32	MF	(England) ENG	Nelson Iseguan	1	0	0+0	0	0+0	0	0+0	0	1+0	0
33	MF	(England) ENG	Louis Morison	1	0	0+0	0	0+0	0	0+0	0	0+1	0
34	DF	(England) ENG	Alex Hartridge	34	2	20+9	0	2+0	1	0+0	0	3+0	1
39	DF	(England) ENG	Cheick Diabate	1	0	0+0	0	0+0	0	0+0	0	0+1	0
40	FW	(England) ENG	Lewis Wilson	1	0	0+0	0	0+0	0	0+0	0	0+1	0
41	DF	(England) ENG	Will Dean	6	0	2+0	0	0+0	0	1+0	0	3+0	0
Players who left on loan during the season:
1	GK	(England) ENG	Lewis Ward	10	0	8+0	0	1+0	0	1+0	0	0+0	0
Players who left during the season:
7	MF	(England) ENG	Nicky Law	23	3	4+14	1	2+1	1	0+0	0	2+0	1

=== Goals record ===
Rank	No.	Nat.	Po.	Name	League Two	FA Cup	League Cup	League Trophy	Total
1	17	(England)	AM	Matt Jay	18	1	0	1	20
2	12	(England)	CF	Ryan Bowman	14	0	0	0	14
3	14	(England)	LW	Joel Randall	8	2	0	0	10
4	8	(Wales)	CM	Jake Taylor	6	0	0	0	6
5	3	(England)	LB	Jack Sparkes	3	0	0	1	4
5	10	(England)	CM	Archie Collins	4	0	0	0	4
5	11	(England)	RW	Randell Williams	4	0	0	0	4
8	7	(England)	CM	Nicky Law	1	1	0	1	3
8	9	(England)	CF	Ben Seymour	1	0	0	2	3
8	26	(Republic of Ireland)	CB	Pierce Sweeney	3	0	0	0	3
11	4	(France)	DM	Nigel Atangana	0	0	0	2	2
11	18	(England)	CF	Alex Fisher	2	0	0	0	2
11	29	(England)	CM	Harry Kite	0	0	0	2	2
11	30	(England)	RB	Joshua Key	1	0	0	1	2
11	34	(England)	CB	Alex Hartridge	0	1	0	1	2
16	6	(Northern Ireland)	CB	Rory McArdle	1	0	0	0	1
16	15	(England)	CB	Tom Parkes	1	0	0	0	1
16	16	(England)	RW	Robbie Willmott	1	0	0	0	1
16	25	(England)	CF	Nicky Ajose	0	0	0	1	1
Own Goals					3	0	0	0	3
Total					71	5	0	12	88

=== Disciplinary record ===
No.	Nat.	Po.	Name	League Two			FA Cup			League Cup			League Trophy			Total		
No.	Nat.	Po.	Name	Booked	(yellow card) (yellow-red card)	Sent off (straight red)	Booked	(yellow card) (yellow-red card)	Sent off (straight red)	Booked	(yellow card) (yellow-red card)	Sent off (straight red)	Booked	(yellow card) (yellow-red card)	Sent off (straight red)	Booked	(yellow card) (yellow-red card)	Sent off (straight red)
3	(England)	LB	Jack Sparkes	3	0	0	1	0	0	1	0	0	0	0	0	5	0	0
4	(France)	DM	Nigel Atangana	2	0	0	1	0	0	0	0	0	0	0	0	3	0	0
6	(Northern Ireland)	CB	Rory McArdle	2	0	0	1	0	0	0	0	0	0	0	0	3	0	0
7	(England)	CM	Nicky Law	1	0	0	0	0	0	0	0	0	0	0	0	1	0	0
8	(Wales)	CM	Jake Taylor	5	0	0	0	0	0	0	0	0	0	0	0	5	0	0
10	(England)	CM	Archie Collins	4	0	0	0	0	0	0	0	0	0	0	0	4	0	0
12	(England)	CF	Ryan Bowman	5	0	1	0	0	0	0	0	0	0	0	0	5	0	1
14	(England)	LW	Joel Randall	2	0	0	0	0	0	0	0	0	0	0	0	2	0	0
15	(England)	CB	Tom Parkes	5	0	1	0	0	0	0	0	0	0	0	0	5	0	1
16	(England)	LM	Robbie Willmott	3	0	0	0	0	0	0	0	0	0	0	0	3	0	0
17	(England)	AM	Matt Jay	1	0	0	0	0	0	0	0	0	0	0	0	1	0	0
20	(England)	LB	Lewis Page	3	0	0	0	0	0	0	0	0	0	0	0	3	0	0
23	(England)	GK	Jonny Maxted	1	0	0	0	0	0	0	0	0	0	0	0	1	0	0
26	(Republic of Ireland)	CB	Pierce Sweeney	5	0	0	0	0	0	0	0	0	1	0	0	6	0	0
30	(England)	RB	Joshua Key	2	0	0	0	0	0	0	0	0	0	0	0	2	0	0
34	(England)	CB	Alex Hartridge	2	0	1	0	0	0	0	0	0	0	0	0	2	0	1
Total				46	0	3	3	0	0	1	0	0	1	0	0	51	0	3
