= James Dodd (footballer) =

English footballer

Personal information
- Full name: James John Dodd
- Date of birth: 27 October 2000 (age 26)
- Place of birth: Exeter, England
- Height: 5 ft 4 in (1.63 m)
- Position: Midfielder

Team information
- Current team: Weston-super-Mare

Youth career
- Exeter City

Senior career*
Years	Team	Apps	(Gls)
2018–2022	Exeter City	0	(0)
2018–2019	→ Taunton Town (loan)	2	(0)
2021–2022	→ Weston-super-Mare (loan)	31	(1)
2022–	Weston-super-Mare	0	(0)
- * Club domestic league appearances and goals as of 17:20, 9 June 2022 (UTC)

James Dodd (born 27 October 2000) is an English footballer who plays as a midfielder for National League South club Weston-super-Mare.

== Career ==
Dodd began his career with Exeter City and made his first-team debut on 25 September 2018 coming on as a substitute in the 59th minute in a 2–0 win against West Ham United under-21s in the EFL Trophy in the 2018–19 season.

He signed a new 1 year contract with the club in July 2021 before making his first appearance of the 2021–22 season in a 0–0 draw with Wycombe Wanderers in the first round of the EFL Cup, however missed a penalty in a 4–3 penalty shootout defeat.

Having joined the club on loan in the 2021–22 season, Dodd joined Weston-super-Mare on a permanent contract in May 2022.

== Career statistics ==
As of match played 26 April 2022

Club	Season	League			FA Cup		EFL Cup		Other		Total	
Club	Season	Division	Apps	Goals	Apps	Goals	Apps	Goals	Apps	Goals	Apps	Goals
Exeter City	2018–19	EFL League Two	0	0	0	0	0	0	1 (Note: Appearance(s) in EFL Trophy)	0	1	0
Exeter City	2019–20	EFL League Two	0	0	0	0	0	0	0	0	0	0
Exeter City	2020–21	EFL League Two	0	0	0	0	0	0	0	0	0	0
Exeter City	2021–22	EFL League Two	0	0	0	0	1	0	1	0	2	0
Exeter City	Total		0	0	0	0	1	0	2	0	3	0
Taunton Town (loan)	2018–19	SFL - Premier Division South	2	0	0	0	—		0	0	2	0
Weston–super–Mare (loan)	2021–22	SFL - Premier Division South	31	1	2	0	—		7 (Note: Two appearances in the FA Trophy, three in the Southern League Cup, one in the Somerset Premier Cup and one in the Southern Football League play-offs)	0	40	1
Career total			33	1	2	0	1	0	9	0	45	1
