= Harry Kite =

English footballer (born 2000)

Personal information
- Full name: Harry George Kite
- Date of birth: 29 June 2000 (age 26)
- Place of birth: Crediton, England
- Height: 5 ft 9 in (1.76 m)
- Position: Midfielder

Team information
- Current team: Exeter City
- Number: 14

Youth career
- Exeter City

Senior career*
Years	Team	Apps	(Gls)
2017–2024	Exeter City	78	(4)
2018–2019	→ Dorchester Town (loan)	35	(3)
2019–2020	→ Taunton Town (loan)	26	(3)
2025	Yeovil Town	7	(0)
2025–2026	Truro City	14	(0)
2025	→ Weston-super-Mare (loan)	5	(0)
2026–	Exeter City	3	(0)
- * Club domestic league appearances and goals as of 21:00, 1 November 2026 (UTC)

Harry George Kite (born 29 June 2000) is an English professional footballer who plays as a midfielder for EFL League Two club Exeter City.

== Career ==
=== Exeter City ===
Kite joined the Exeter City Academy at the under-9 stage, and went on to make his first-team debut on 29 August 2017, coming on as a ninth-minute substitute for Luke Croll in a 3–1 EFL Trophy group stage defeat to Yeovil Town at St James Park.

On 16 August 2019, Kite was loaned out to Taunton Town for three months. On 30 October Exeter confirmed, that the deal had been extended until January. On 9 January 2020, the deal was extended once again, this time until the end of the season.

He scored his first goal for Exeter in an EFL Trophy tie against Swindon Town on 6 October 2020. Injuries to Nigel Atangana and Archie Collins saw Kite become a regular in the first team at the start of the 2021–22 season, and he went on to score his first League goal for Exeter in a 4–1 victory over Bristol Rovers on 21 August 2021.

In April 2024, manager Gary Caldwell confirmed that Kite would leave the club at the end of the 2023–24 season.

Following his departure from the club, Kite suffered a hamstring injury in October 2024 that required surgery, being allowed to return to Exeter City for his rehabilitation as he continued to search for a new club.

=== Yeovil Town ===
On 28 March 2025, Kite signed for National League side Yeovil Town on a short-term deal until the end of the 2024–25 season.

=== Truro City ===
On 27 June 2025, Kite joined newly promoted National League side Truro City on a two-year deal.

On 6 December 2025, he joined National League South club Weston-super-Mare on a one-month loan.

=== Return to Exeter City ===
On 6 August 2026, Kite returned to Exeter City on a one-year deal with a club option of an additional year.

== Style of play ==
Kite is an energetic midfielder with a good passing range and long-range shooting ability.

== Career statistics ==
As of match played 31 October 2026

Appearances and goals by club, season and competition
Club	Season	League			FA Cup		League Cup		Other		Total	
Club	Season	Division	Apps	Goals	Apps	Goals	Apps	Goals	Apps	Goals	Apps	Goals
Exeter City	2017–18	League Two	0	0	0	0	0	0	1 (Note: Appearance(s) in the EFL Trophy)	0	1	0
Exeter City	2018–19	League Two	0	0	0	0	0	0	1	0	1	0
Exeter City	2019–20	League Two	0	0	0	0	0	0	2	0	2	0
Exeter City	2020–21	League Two	4	0	1	0	0	0	4	2	9	2
Exeter City	2021–22	League Two	14	1	2	0	1	0	3	0	20	1
Exeter City	2022–23	League One	40	3	1	0	2	1	1	0	44	4
Exeter City	2023–24	League One	20	0	1	0	2	0	2	0	25	0
Exeter City	Total		78	4	5	0	5	1	14	2	102	7
Dorchester Town (loan)	2018–19	SFL - Premier Division South	35	3	3	0	—		8 (Note: One appearance in the Southern League Cup, one appearance in the Dorset Senior Cup, and six appearances and two goals in the FA Trophy)	2	46	5
Taunton Town (loan)	2019–20	SFL - Premier Division South	26	3	1	0	—		6 (Note: Two appearances in the Southern League Cup, and four appearances and two goals in the FA Trophy)	2	33	5
Yeovil Town	2024–25	National League	7	0	—		—		—		7	0
Truro City	2025–26	National League	14	0	1	0	—		3 (Note: Appearances in National League Cup)	0	18	0
Weston-super-Mare (loan)	2025–26	National League South	5	0	1	0	—		1 (Note: Appearance in FA Trophy)	0	7	0
Exeter City	2026–27	League Two	3	0	0	0	1	0	2	0	6	0
Career total			168	10	11	0	6	1	34	6	219	17

== Honours ==
Exeter City

- League Two runner-up: 2021–22

Individual

- EFL League One Goal of the Month: August 2022
