= Alex Hartridge =

English footballer

Personal information
- Full name: Alex Duncan Hartridge
- Date of birth: 9 March 1999 (age 27)
- Place of birth: Torquay, England
- Height: 6 ft 1 in (1.85 m)
- Position: Defender

Team information
- Current team: Plymouth Argyle
- Number: 22

Youth career
- –2016: Exeter City

Senior career*
Years	Team	Apps	(Gls)
2016–2024	Exeter City	131	(0)
2017	→ Truro City (loan)	9	(0)
2017	→ Truro City (loan)	10	(1)
2017–2018	→ Truro City (loan)	14	(0)
2018	→ Truro City (loan)	7	(0)
2018	→ Truro City (loan)	3	(0)
2019	→ Bath City (loan)	17	(1)
2019–2020	→ Bath City (loan)	6	(1)
2020	→ Bath City (loan)	9	(0)
2024–2025	Wycombe Wanderers	6	(0)
2025	→ Exeter City (loan)	18	(1)
2025–2026	Burton Albion	38	(3)
2026–	Plymouth Argyle	11	(0)
- * Club domestic league appearances and goals as of 13:04, 22 November 2026 (UTC)

Alex Duncan Hartridge (born 9 March 1999) is an English professional footballer who plays as a defender for EFL League One club Plymouth Argyle.

== Career ==
=== Exeter City ===
Born in Torquay, Hartridge began his career with Exeter City, turning professional in April 2017. He spent five spells on loan at Truro City.

He made his senior debut for Exeter City on 28 November 2017, in the EFL Cup. He made his Football League debut for them on 29 December 2018.

On 12 July 2019, Hartridge signed a six-month loan deal with National League South side Bath City. In mid-November, he was recalled due to Exeter's injury crisis. Hartridge sat on the bench for one game, before he headed back to Bath City. However, he was recalled once again on 3 January 2020 to be involved in Exeter's weekend fixture. On 9 January 2020, he headed back to Bath City for the third team, the club confirmed, for the rest of the season.

He scored his first goal for Exeter in an EFL Trophy tie against Swindon Town on 6 October 2020.

In March 2024, Hartridge's departure from the club at the end of the season was announced with the defender having rejected the offer of a new contract.

=== Wycombe Wanderers ===
In May 2024 it was announced that he would sign for Wycombe Wanderers on 1 July 2024.

He returned on loan to Exeter City in January 2025.

=== Burton Albion ===
On 1 September 2025, Hartridge signed for fellow League One club Burton Albion on a one-year deal for an undisclosed fee.

=== Plymouth Argyle ===
In June 2026, it was announced that Hartridge would sign for Plymouth Argyle on 1 July 2026, following the expiry of his Burton contract. On 10 August 2026, Hartridge scored on his debut for the club, in the first round of the EFL Cup against his former club Exeter City.

== Career statistics ==
As of match played 21 November 2026

Appearances and goals by club, season and competition
Club	Season	League			FA Cup		EFL Cup		Other		Total	
Club	Season	Division	Apps	Goals	Apps	Goals	Apps	Goals	Apps	Goals	Apps	Goals
Exeter City	2016–17	League Two	0	0	0	0	0	0	0	0	0	0
Exeter City	2017–18	League Two	0	0	0	0	0	0	1 (Note: Appearance(s) in EFL Trophy)	0	1	0
Exeter City	2018–19	League Two	3	0	0	0	0	0	0	0	3	0
Exeter City	2019–20	League Two	0	0	0	0	0	0	2	0	2	0
Exeter City	2020–21	League Two	29	0	2	1	0	0	3	1	34	2
Exeter City	2021–22	League Two	28	0	3	0	0	0	0	0	31	0
Exeter City	2022–23	League One	43	0	2	0	2	0	1	0	48	0
Exeter City	2023–24	League One	28	0	1	0	4	1	2	0	35	1
Exeter City	Total		131	0	8	1	6	1	9	1	154	3
Truro City (loan)	2016–17	National League South	9	0	0	0	—		0	0	9	0
Truro City (loan)	2017–18	National League South	23	1	3	0	—		3 (Note: Two appearances in FA Trophy, one appearance in National League South play-offs)	0	29	1
Truro City (loan)	2018–19	National League South	10	0	2	0	—		0	0	12	0
Bath City (loan)	2019–20	National League South	32	2	2	0	—		7 (Note: Five appearances in FA Trophy, one appearance in Somerset Premier Cup, one appearance in National League South play-offs)	0	41	2
Wycombe Wanderers	2024–25	League One	6	0	2	0	3	0	3	0	14	0
Exeter City (loan)	2024–25	League One	18	1	0	0	0	0	0	0	18	1
Burton Albion	2025–26	League One	38	3	2	0	0	0	2	0	42	3
Plymouth Argyle	2026–27	League One	11	0	1	0	1	1	1	0	14	1
Career total			278	7	20	1	10	2	25	1	333	11

== Honours ==
Exeter City

- League Two runner-up: 2021–22
