= Myles Abraham =

Ireland international rugby union player (1887–1966)

Myles Abraham DCM MM
- Born: 9 May 1887 Rathfarnham, Dublin, Ireland
- Died: 7 July 1966 (aged 79) Exeter, Devon, England

Rugby union career
- Position: Three-quarter
Senior career
Years	Team	Apps	(Points)
–	Clontarf F.C.		
–	Bective Rangers		
–	Leicester Tigers		
International career
Years	Team	Apps	(Points)
1912–14	Ireland	5	(0)
- Military career
- Allegiance: United Kingdom
- Branch: British Army
- Unit: Royal Field Artillery
- Conflicts: World War I
- Awards: Military Medal; Distinguished Conduct Medal

Myles Abraham (9 May 1887 – 7 July 1966) was an Irish international rugby union player.

== Biography ==
Born and raised in Dublin, Abraham grew up as one of eight siblings. Both his parents worked at St Columba's College, Dublin, his father as a coachman and his mother as a dairymaid.

Abraham, a solicitor's clerk, was a three-quarter in rugby and played some of his early senior matches with Clontarf, but gained his Ireland caps after moving to Bective Rangers, which he captained in 1912–13. His primary position was centre and it was in this role that he represented Ireland in three 1912 Five Nations matches, helping them claim a share of the championship with England. He was capped a fourth time later that year against the touring South African team, then made his fifth and final appearance in 1914, as a wing three-quarter against Wales. In addition to playing rugby, Abraham was also an Irish amateur heavyweight boxing champion.

In World War I, Abraham served as an officer in the Royal Field Artillery and was awarded the Distinguished Conduct Medal in 1918 for "conspicuous gallantry and devotion to duty". He also received a Military Medal and was recommended for the Victoria Cross (VC). The Victoria Cross didn't eventuate as the major who had recommended Abraham was killed during the conflict.

Abraham played some post war rugby for the Leicester Tigers and Ripon in England.

Retiring from his civil service job in 1953, Myles retired to Devon, where many of his 14 children resided.

Abraham's great-grandson Joshua Key is an English professional footballer.

== See also ==
- List of Ireland national rugby union players
