= Joshua Key (footballer) =

English footballer (born 1999)

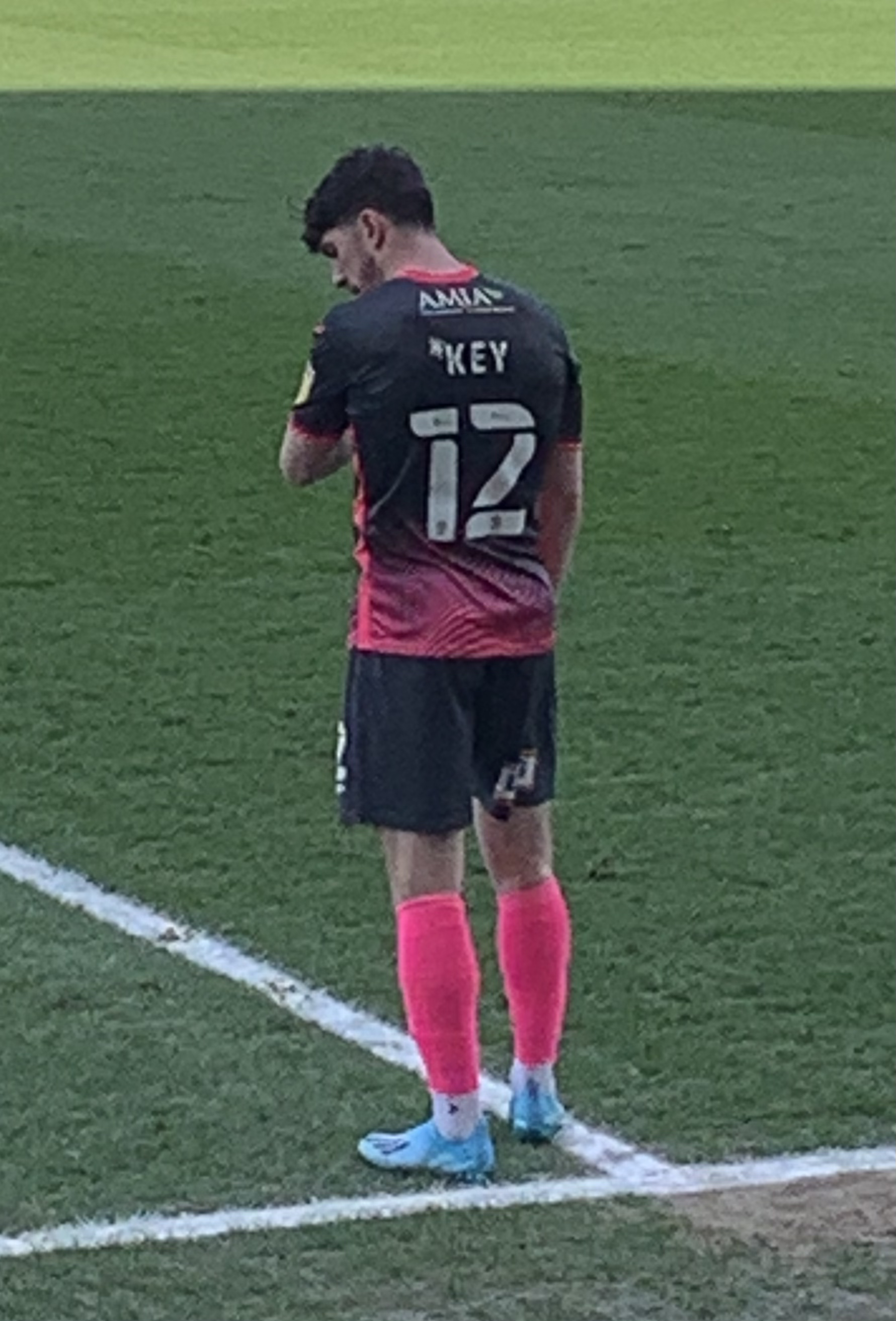
- Key playing for Exeter City F.C. in 2022.

Personal information
- Full name: Joshua Myles Abraham Key
- Date of birth: 19 November 1999 (age 26)
- Place of birth: Torquay, England
- Height: 6 ft 0 in (1.82 m)
- Position: Defender

Team information
- Current team: Swansea City
- Number: 2

Youth career
- –2015: Torquay United
- 2015–2018: Exeter City

Senior career*
Years	Team	Apps	(Gls)
2018–2023	Exeter City	129	(7)
2018	→ Bideford (loan)	15	(3)
2018–2019	→ Tiverton Town (loan)	40	(4)
2019–2020	→ Tiverton Town (loan)	16	(4)
2023–	Swansea City	111	(5)
- * Club domestic league appearances and goals as of 18:00, 31 October 2026 (UTC)

Joshua Myles Abraham Key (born 19 November 1999) is an English professional footballer who plays as a defender for EFL Championship club Swansea City.

== Club career ==
Key started his career at Torquay United while attending St Cuthbert Mayne School in Torquay, but joined local rivals Exeter City after the Gulls were forced to close their youth academy as part of cost-cutting measures. The winger was part of a successful Grecians youth setup, winning the Youth Alliance South West Division as part of Exeter's under-18 side. Key joined Bideford on a three-month loan deal in February 2018, making his debut in against Tiverton Town on 7 February. He earned praise from manager Sean Joyce for his performances for the Robins, and was offered a senior contract by Exeter for the following season.

In July 2018, Key (alongside teammate Joel Randall) joined Southern League Premier Division South side Tiverton Town on an initial six-month loan deal. Key made his professional debut for Exeter in November 2018 during Exeter's EFL Trophy tie against Bristol Rovers, coming on as a substitute for Chiedozie Ogbene in the 60th minute. He scored his first goal for the club in an EFL Trophy tie against Forest Green Rovers on 8 September 2020. He then scored his first League Two goal in Exeter's 2–1 win at Mansfield Town on 26 September 2020.

On 4 July 2023, Key signed for Championship club Swansea City on a three-year contract.

== International career ==
Key qualifies for the Republic of Ireland under FIFA's grandparent rule.

== Personal life ==
Key is of Irish descent through a grandmother, and is the great-grandson of Myles Abraham who captained the Ireland national rugby union team before World War I.

== Career statistics ==
As of match played 31 January 2026

Appearances and goals by club, season and competition
Club	Season	League			FA Cup		League Cup		Other		Total	
Club	Season	Division	Apps	Goals	Apps	Goals	Apps	Goals	Apps	Goals	Apps	Goals
Exeter City	2017–18	EFL League Two	0	0	0	0	0	0	0	0	0	0
Exeter City	2018–19	EFL League Two	0	0	0	0	0	0	1 (Note: Appearance(s) in the EFL Trophy)	0	1	0
Exeter City	2019–20	EFL League Two	0	0	0	0	0	0	2	0	2	0
Exeter City	2020–21	EFL League Two	43	1	3	0	1	0	1	1	48	2
Exeter City	2021–22	EFL League Two	44	2	3	0	0	0	2	0	49	2
Exeter City	2022–23	EFL League One	42	4	2	0	2	0	2	0	48	4
Exeter City	Total		129	7	8	0	3	0	8	1	148	8
Bideford (loan)	2017–18	Southern League West Division	15	3	0	0	0	0	3 (Note: Appearances in the Devon St Luke's Challenge Cup)	1	18	4
Tiverton Town (loan)	2018–19	Southern League Premier South	48	5								
Tiverton Town (loan)	2019–20	Southern League Premier South	19	6								
Swansea City	2023–24	EFL Championship	29	2	0	0	2	0	0	0	31	2
Swansea City	2024–25	EFL Championship	45	1	1	0	1	0	0	0	47	1
Swansea City	2025–26	EFL Championship	23	1	1	0	3	0	0	0	27	1
Swansea City	Total		97	4	2	0	6	0	0	0	105	4
Career total			211	21	8	0	3	0	11	2	233	23

== Honours ==
Exeter City

- League Two runner-up: 2021–22
