= Lewis Page (English footballer) =

English footballer

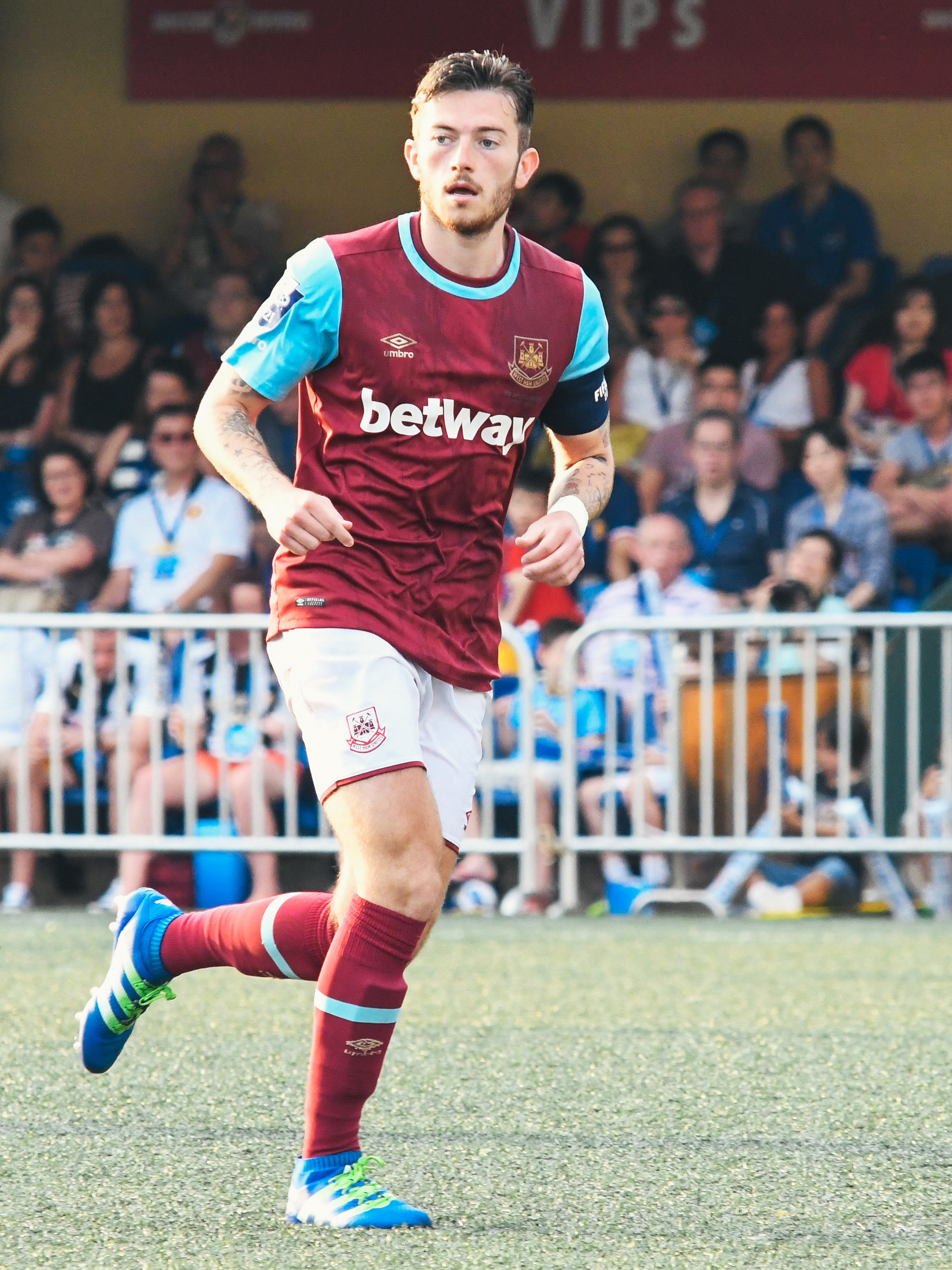
- Page playing for West Ham United academy in 2016

Personal information
- Full name: Lewis Robert Page
- Date of birth: 20 May 1996 (age 30)
- Place of birth: Enfield, England
- Height: 5 ft 10 in (1.78 m)
- Position: Left back

Team information
- Current team: St Albans City
- Number: 3

Youth career
- 2009–2014: West Ham United

Senior career*
| Years | Team | Apps | (Gls) |
| 2014–2017 | West Ham United | 0 | (0) |
| 2016 | → Cambridge United (loan) | 6 | (0) |
| 2016 | → Coventry City (loan) | 22 | (0) |
| 2017–2020 | Charlton Athletic | 27 | (1) |
| 2020–2021 | Exeter City | 32 | (0) |
| 2021–2022 | Harrogate Town | 28 | (1) |
| 2022 | Mansfield Town | 1 | (0) |
| 2023 | Gillingham | 3 | (0) |
| 2023–2024 | Dagenham & Redbridge | 20 | (1) |
| 2024–2025 | Ebbsfleet United | 16 | (1) |
| 2025– | St Albans City | 0 | (0) |
- * Club domestic league appearances and goals as of 13:08, 8 July 2025 (UTC)

Lewis Robert Page (born 20 May 1996) is an English professional footballer who plays as a left back for Isthmian League Premier Division club St Albans City.

== Career ==
=== West Ham United ===
Page was first included in a West Ham United matchday squad for their League Cup second round fixture against Sheffield United at the Boleyn Ground on 26 August 2014, but he remained an unused substitute as they lost in a penalty shootout after a 1–1 draw.

On 2 July 2015, he made his first-team debut for the club in a 3–0 home victory over Lusitanos of Andorra in the UEFA Europa League first qualifying round first leg, playing the full 90 minutes; he also played the entirety of their 1–0 victory in the second leg a week later. With manager Slaven Bilić putting priority on the team's Premier League performance, he made an array of changes for their third qualifying round second leg away to FC Astra Giurgiu on 6 August, including starting Page in his first competitive match against a professional opponent.

=== Cambridge United and Coventry City (loan) ===
Page was loaned for a month to Cambridge United of League Two on 2 January 2016. He made his league debut later that day, playing the full 90 minutes of a 1–4 loss to AFC Wimbledon at the Abbey Stadium.

On 9 August 2016, Page joined League One side Coventry City on a five-month loan deal. He made 22 appearances before the appointment of new Coventry manager, Russell Slade, saw Page's loan terminated in January 2017.

=== Charlton Athletic ===
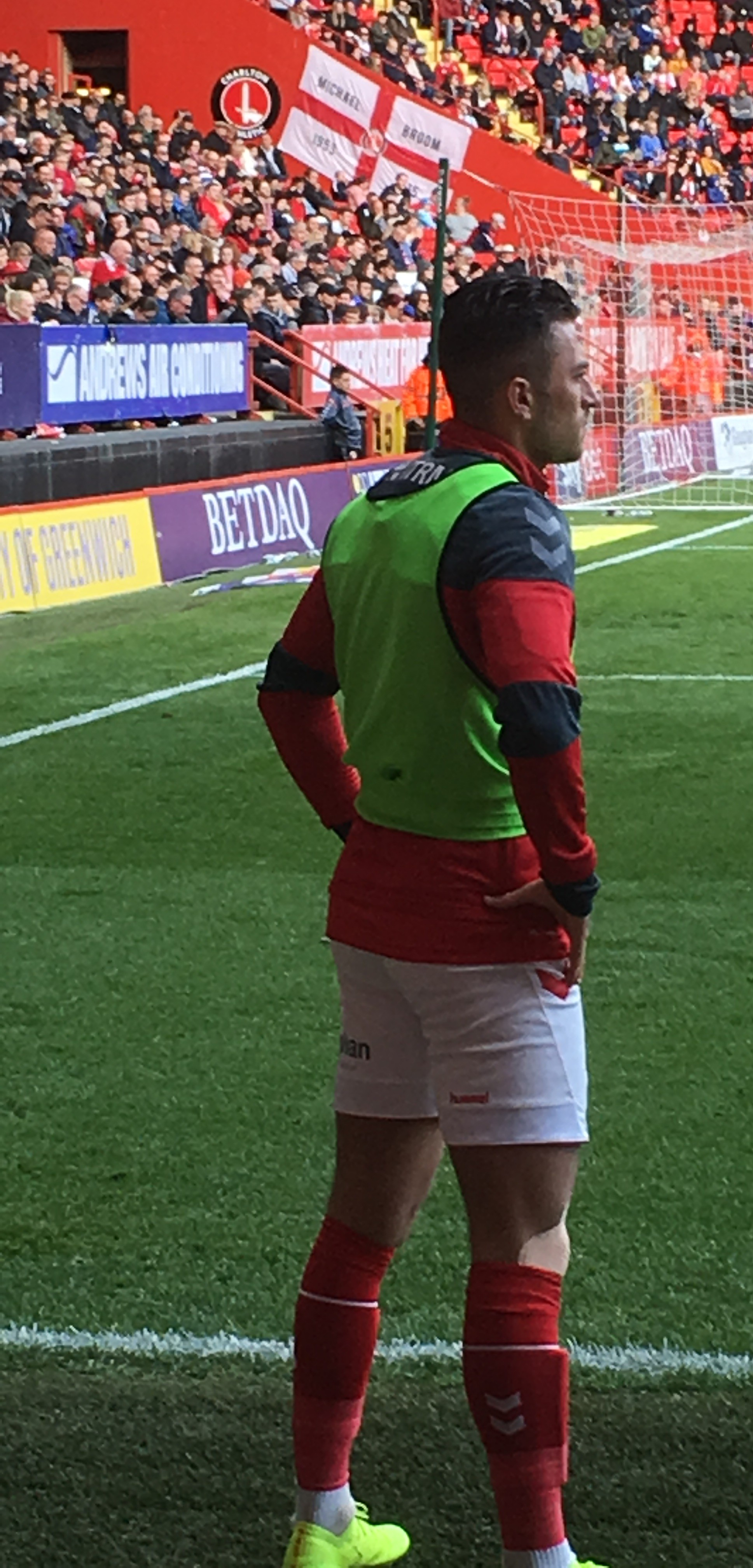
Page in 2019

On 6 January 2017, Page joined Charlton Athletic on a permanent deal until 2019. He played 22 games for Charlton, including in a 2–0 win, against Plymouth Argyle, in which Page scored his first goal in his career.

=== Exeter City ===
After leaving Charlton, Page signed for League Two club Exeter City on 1 September 2020, after turning down a contract from rivals Plymouth. He made his debut in a 2–0 away defeat to Bristol City in the EFL Cup first round.

=== Harrogate Town ===
After leaving Exeter City at the end of the 2020–21 season, he joined League Two side, Harrogate Town on 16 July 2021. He made his debut, coming on as a substitute, on 7 August, in a 3–2 win against Rochdale. He was released by Harrogate in summer 2022.

=== Mansfield Town ===
On 16 November 2022, Page signed for Mansfield Town on an initial one-month contract.

=== Gillingham ===
Page joined Gillingham on a short-term contract in February 2023. Page was released at the conclusion of the 2022–23 season, having made just three substitute appearances for the League Two side.

=== Dagenham & Redbridge ===
On 27 July 2023, Page signed for National League club Dagenham & Redbridge on a one-year deal having impressed in pre-season.

=== Ebbsfleet United ===
On 30 May 2024, Page signed for National League club Ebbsfleet United.

=== St Albans City ===
On 7 July 2025, Page joined Isthmian League Premier Division club St Albans City.

== Personal life ==
Page grew up in Bishop's Stortford and attended The Bishop's Stortford High School.

== Career statistics ==
As of matches played 15 March 2024

Appearances and goals by club, season and competition
| Club | Season | League | | | FA Cup | | EFL Cup | | Europe | | Other | | Total | |
| Club | Season | Division | Apps | Goals | Apps | Goals | Apps | Goals | Apps | Goals | Apps | Goals | Apps | Goals |
|---|---|---|---|---|---|---|---|---|---|---|---|---|---|---|
| West Ham United | 2014–15 | Premier League | 0 | 0 | 0 | 0 | 0 | 0 | — | | — | | 3 | 0 |
| West Ham United | 2015–16 | Premier League | 0 | 0 | 0 | 0 | 0 | 0 | 3 (Note: Three appearances in UEFA Europa League) | 0 | — | | 3 | 0 |
| West Ham United | 2016–17 | Premier League | 0 | 0 | — | | — | | 0 | 0 | — | | 0 | 0 |
| West Ham United | Total | | 0 | 0 | 0 | 0 | 0 | 0 | 3 | 0 | — | | 3 | 0 |
| Cambridge United (loan) | 2015–16 | League Two | 6 | 0 | — | | — | | — | | — | | 6 | 0 |
| Coventry City (loan) | 2016–17 | League One | 22 | 0 | 1 | 0 | 1 | 0 | — | | 2 (Note: Appearances in EFL Trophy) | 0 | 26 | 0 |
| Charlton Athletic | 2016–17 | League One | 8 | 0 | — | | — | | — | | — | | 8 | 0 |
| Charlton Athletic | 2017–18 | League One | 8 | 1 | 0 | 0 | 0 | 0 | — | | 0 | 0 | 8 | 1 |
| Charlton Athletic | 2018–19 | League One | 11 | 0 | 0 | 0 | 0 | 0 | — | | 0 | 0 | 11 | 0 |
| Charlton Athletic | 2019–20 | Championship | 0 | 0 | 0 | 0 | 0 | 0 | — | | — | | 0 | 0 |
| Charlton Athletic | Total | | 27 | 1 | 0 | 0 | 0 | 0 | — | | 0 | 0 | 27 | 1 |
| Exeter City | 2020–21 | League Two | 32 | 0 | 2 | 0 | 1 | 0 | — | | 0 | 0 | 35 | 0 |
| Harrogate Town | 2021–22 | League Two | 28 | 1 | 3 | 0 | 0 | 0 | — | | 4 | 0 | 35 | 1 |
| Mansfield Town | 2022–23 | League Two | 1 | 0 | 0 | 0 | — | | — | | 0 | 0 | 1 | 0 |
| Gillingham | 2022–23 | League Two | 3 | 0 | — | | — | | — | | — | | 3 | 0 |
| Dagenham & Redbridge | 2023–24 | National League | 20 | 1 | 1 | 0 | — | | — | | 0 | 0 | 21 | 1 |
| Ebbsfleet United | 2024–25 | National League | 16 | 1 | 0 | 0 | — | | — | | 0 | 0 | 16 | 1 |
| St Albans City | 2025–26 | Isthmian League Premier Division | 0 | 0 | 0 | 0 | — | | — | | 0 | 0 | 0 | 0 |
| Career total | | | 155 | 4 | 7 | 0 | 2 | 0 | 3 | 0 | 6 | 0 | 173 | 4 |
