= Lewis Ward (footballer) =

English footballer (born 1997)

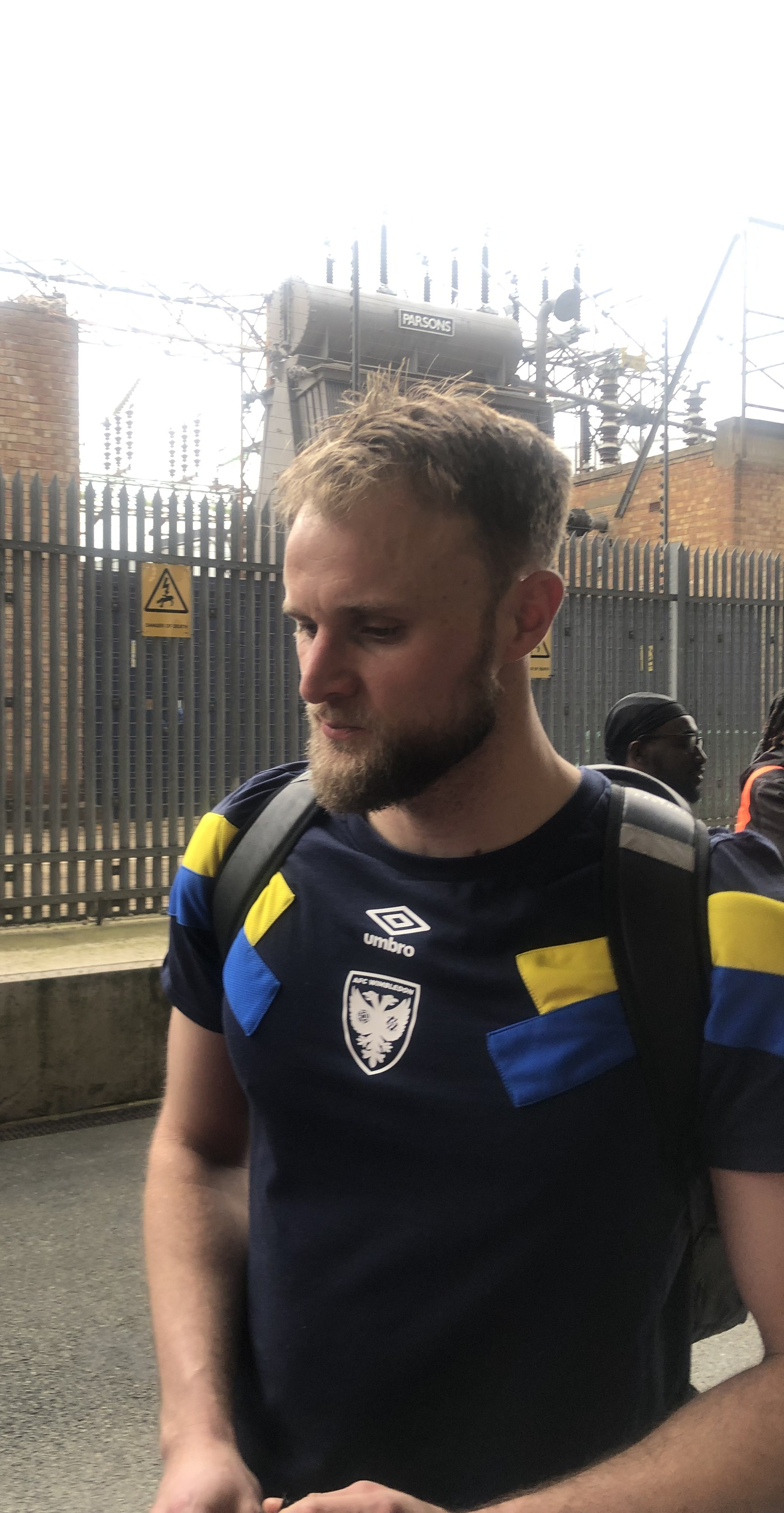
- Ward in 2025

Personal information
- Full name: Lewis Moore Ward
- Date of birth: 5 March 1997 (age 29)
- Height: 6 ft 5 in (1.96 m)
- Position: Goalkeeper

Team information
- Current team: Swindon Town
- Number: 12

Youth career
- –2012: Reading
- 2012–2013: → Portsmouth (loan)

Senior career*
Years	Team	Apps	(Gls)
2014–2019	Reading	0	(0)
2014	→ Whitehawk (loan)	0	(0)
2016	→ Sutton United (loan)	0	(0)
2016	→ Fylkir (loan)	3	(0)
2016	→ Margate (loan)	13	(0)
2017	→ Margate (loan)	6	(0)
2017	→ Hungerford Town (loan)	10	(0)
2017	→ Hungerford Town (loan)	17	(0)
2017–2018	→ Aldershot Town (loan)	25	(0)
2018–2019	→ Northampton Town (loan)	0	(0)
2019	→ Forest Green Rovers (loan)	12	(0)
2019–2021	Exeter City	28	(0)
2021	→ Portsmouth (loan)	0	(0)
2021–2022	Swindon Town	9	(0)
2022–2023	Sutton United	9	(0)
2023–2024	Swindon Town	5	(0)
2024	Charlton Athletic	0	(0)
2024–2025	AFC Wimbledon	0	(0)
2025–	Swindon Town	0	(0)

International career
2013	England U16	3	(0)
- * Club domestic league appearances and goals as of 20:39, 22 September 2026 (UTC)

Lewis Moore Ward (born 5 March 1997) is an English professional footballer who plays as a goalkeeper for EFL League Two club Swindon Town.

== Career ==
=== Reading ===
Ward began his career with Reading, and has a youth loan with Portsmouth during the 2012–13 season.

He joined Whitehawk on loan on 10 October 2014, in a deal that lasted until 7 November 2014. He made two FA Cup appearances, conceding four goals in each game.

On 5 May 2016, Ward joined Icelandic Úrvalsdeild side Fylkir on loan until 26 June 2016.

Ward signed on loan for Margate in August 2016, before having two spells with Hungerford Town, the second beginning in August 2017.

Ward moved on loan to Aldershot Town in November 2017, originally until January 2018, but this was later extended until the end of the season. Aldershot made it to the play-offs, losing out to Ebbsfleet United after a penalty shoot out. Initially Aldershot went ahead 3–1 on penalties due to two saves by Ward, however Ward himself hit the post with the deciding penalty.

On 22 June 2018, Ward signed a new contract with Reading, keeping him at the club until the summer of 2020.

Ward joined Northampton Town on a season-long loan on 27 July 2018. He made his professional debut on 14 August 2018, in the EFL Cup, and made four further appearances in the EFL Trophy. On 14 January 2019, Reading announced that Ward's loan with Northampton Town had ended early, and that he would join Forest Green Rovers on loan for the remainder of the season.

=== Exeter City ===
On 20 June 2019, Ward signed for Exeter City on a two-year contract for an undisclosed fee. On 5 October 2019, Ward suffered a broken arm in a League Two fixture against Crewe Alexandra. The injury came in the 86th minute, and Ward continued until the end of the match.

He was replaced in the starting XI by Jonny Maxted, but returned to the lineup in February 2020 when Maxted suffered an injury in the pre-match warmup away at Swindon Town, by which time Ward had recovered to match fitness.

In January 2021 he moved on loan to Portsmouth.

On 12 May 2021 it was announced that he would leave Exeter at the end of the season, following the expiry of his contract.

=== Swindon Town ===
On 27 July 2021, Ward signed for Swindon Town on a one-year contract following a trial. He made his league debut at Forest Green Rovers on 9 October 2021, keeping a clean sheet and saving a penalty.

=== Sutton United ===
He transferred to Sutton United on 1 September 2022 for an undisclosed fee. His contact was mutually terminated on 31 January 2023.

=== Return to Swindon Town ===
On 22 August 2023 he re-signed for Swindon Town, also becoming the club's Youth Development Phase Lead Coach. On 18 January 2024, it was announced that Ward had left the club.

=== Charlton Athletic ===
On 22 January 2024, Ward joined Charlton Athletic on a deal until the end of the season, with a club option of an additional year. On 3 May 2024, it was confirmed that Ward would leave Charlton Athletic when his contract expired having not made any first-team appearances for the club.

=== AFC Wimbledon ===
On 11 July 2024, Ward joined League Two side AFC Wimbledon on a free transfer, signing a one-year deal.

=== Swindon Town ===
On 3 July 2025, Ward rejoined Swindon Town for the third time in his career, signing a one-year deal. On 10 May 2026, the club announced it had extended his contract by a year.

== Personal life ==
Ward has obtained a degree in Sports Journalism from the University of Staffordshire.

== Career statistics ==
As of 10 November 2026

Appearances and goals by club, season and competition
Club	Season	League			National Cup		League Cup		Other		Total	
Club	Season	Division	Apps	Goals	Apps	Goals	Apps	Goals	Apps	Goals	Apps	Goals
Reading	2014–15	Championship	0	0	0	0	0	0	0	0	0	0
Reading	2015–16	Championship	0	0	0	0	0	0	0	0	0	0
Reading	2016–17	Championship	0	0	0	0	0	0	0	0	0	0
Reading	2017–18	Championship	0	0	0	0	0	0	0	0	0	0
Reading	2018–19	Championship	0	0	0	0	0	0	0	0	0	0
Reading	Total		0	0	0	0	0	0	0	0	0	0
Whitehawk (loan)	2014–15	Conference South	0	0	2	0	0	0	0	0	2	0
Sutton United (loan)	2015–16	National League South	0	0	0	0	0	0	0	0	0	0
Fylkir (loan)	2016	Úrvalsdeild	3	0	0	0	0	0	0	0	3	0
Margate (loan)	2016–17	National League South	19	0	1	0	0	0	0	0	20	0
Hungerford Town (loan)	2016–17	National League South	10	0	0	0	0	0	0	0	10	0
Hungerford Town (loan)	2017–18	National League South	17	0	0	0	0	0	0	0	17	0
Aldershot Town (loan)	2017–18	National League	25	0	0	0	0	0	1 (Note: Appearance(s) in the National League play-offs.)	0	26	0
Northampton Town (loan)	2018–19	League Two	0	0	0	0	1	0	4 (Note: Appearance(s) in the EFL Trophy.)	0	5	0
Forest Green Rovers (loan)	2018–19	League Two	12	0	0	0	0	0	2	0	14	0
Exeter City	2019–20	League Two	20	0	0	0	0	0	3 (Note: Two appearances in EFL Trophy, one appearance in play-offs)	0	23	0
Exeter City	2020–21	League Two	8	0	1	0	1	0	0	0	10	0
Exeter City	Total		28	0	1	0	1	0	3	0	33	0
Portsmouth (loan)	2020–21	League One	0	0	0	0	0	0	0	0	0	0
Swindon Town	2021–22	League Two	9	0	1	0	1	0	6 (Note: Four appearances in EFL Trophy, two appearances in play-offs)	0	17	0
Sutton United	2022–23	League Two	9	0	1	0	1	0	1	0	12	0
Swindon Town	2023–24	League Two	5	0	0	0	0	0	3	0	8	0
Charlton Athletic	2023–24	League One	0	0	0	0	0	0	0	0	0	0
AFC Wimbledon	2024–25	League Two	0	0	0	0	0	0	4	0	4	0
Swindon Town	2025–26	League Two	0	0	0	0	1	0	5	0	6	0
Swindon Town	2026–27	League Two	0	0	0	0	0	0	3	0	3	0
Swindon Town	Total		0	0	0	0	1	0	8	0	9	0
Career total			137	0	6	0	5	0	32	0	180	0

== Honours ==
Portsmouth

- EFL Trophy runner-up: 2019–20

AFC Wimbledon

- EFL League Two play-offs: 2025
