= Jack Sparkes =

English footballer (born 2000)

Personal information
- Full name: Jack Sparkes
- Date of birth: 29 September 2000 (age 26)
- Place of birth: Exmouth, England
- Height: 5 ft 10 in (1.77 m)
- Positions: Left-back; left wing-back

Team information
- Current team: Bristol Rovers
- Number: 3

Youth career
- –2017: Exeter City

Senior career*
Years	Team	Apps	(Gls)
2017–2023	Exeter City	118	(6)
2018	→ Chippenham Town (loan)	3	(0)
2018–2019	→ Salisbury (loan)	21	(2)
2021–2022	→ Torquay United (loan)	3	(1)
2023–2024	Portsmouth	38	(0)
2024–2025	Peterborough United	21	(0)
2025	→ Chesterfield (loan)	10	(0)
2025–	Bristol Rovers	50	(3)
- * Club domestic league appearances and goals as of 18:33, 21 November 2026 (UTC)

Jack Sparkes (born 29 September 2000) is an English footballer who plays as a left-back or left wing-back for EFL League Two club Bristol Rovers.

== Career ==
=== Exeter City and loans ===
Sparkes began his career with Exeter City and made his professional debut for the Grecians on 12 August 2017 in a 1–1 away draw at Swindon Town. He then made his first appearance at Exeter's home ground St James Park the following week in a 1–0 win over Lincoln City. He scored his first goal for Exeter in an EFL Trophy tie against Yeovil Town on 29 August 2017.

In October 2018, Sparkes joined National League South side Chippenham Town on a one-month loan deal. On 21 December, he was loaned out again, this time to Salisbury for one month. The deal was later extended until the end of the season.

Sparkes broke into the Exeter City first team in the first half of the 2019–20 season, making 17 first-team appearances in League Two before being ruled out for the rest of the campaign with a knee injury sustained against Newport County.

Following his recovery from a shoulder injury suffered early on in the 2021–22 season, Sparkes joined National League side Torquay United on loan on 9 December 2021, with the deal lasting until 8 January 2022.

=== Portsmouth ===
Sparkes signed a two-year contract with League One side Portsmouth in June 2023.

=== Peterborough United ===
On 26 July 2024, Sparkes joined Peterborough United for an undisclosed fee on a three-year contract.

On 20 January 2025, he joined League Two side Chesterfield on loan for the remainder of the season.

On 6 May 2025, Peterborough announced the player had been transfer listed.

=== Bristol Rovers ===
On 23 June 2025, Sparkes joined League Two side Bristol Rovers on a free transfer with performance-related contingency fees, signing a two-year deal with the Gas.

== Career statistics ==
As of match played 21 November 2026

Appearances and goals by club, season and competition
Club	Season	Division	League		FA Cup		EFL Cup		Other		Total	
Club	Season	Division	Apps	Goals	Apps	Goals	Apps	Goals	Apps	Goals	Apps	Goals
Exeter City	2017–18	EFL League Two	3	0	0	0	0	0	3 (Note: Appearance(s) in EFL Trophy)	1	6	1
Exeter City	2018–19	EFL League Two	0	0	0	0	2	0	3	0	5	0
Exeter City	2019–20	EFL League Two	17	0	3	0	1	0	4 (Note: Two appearances in EFL Trophy, two appearances in League Two play-offs)	0	25	0
Exeter City	2020–21	EFL League Two	42	3	3	0	1	0	4	1	50	4
Exeter City	2021–22	EFL League Two	21	2	1	0	1	0	1	0	24	2
Exeter City	2022–23	EFL League One	35	1	2	0	1	1	2	0	40	2
Exeter City	Total		118	6	9	0	6	1	17	2	150	9
Chippenham Town (loan)	2018–19	National League South	3	0	0	0	—		1 (Note: Appearance in Wiltshire County FA Senior Cup)	0	4	0
Salisbury (loan)	2018–19	Southern Premier South	21	2	0	0	—		3 (Note: One appearance in Southern League Cup, one appearance in FA Trophy, one appearance in Southern League Premier Division South play-offs)	0	24	2
Torquay United (loan)	2020–21	National League	3	1	—		—		1 (Note: Appearance in FA Trophy)	0	4	1
Portsmouth	2023–24	League One	38	0	0	0	2	0	2	0	42	0
Peterborough United	2024–25	League One	21	0	2	0	1	0	4	1	28	1
Chesterfield (loan)	2024–25	League Two	10	0	0	0	0	0	2 (Note: Appearance(s) in EFL League Two play-offs)	0	12	0
Bristol Rovers	2025–26	League Two	42	2	0	0	1	0	4	0	47	2
Bristol Rovers	2026–27	League Two	8	1	0	0	0	0	3	0	11	1
Bristol Rovers	Total		50	3	0	0	1	0	7	0	58	3
Career total			264	12	11	0	10	1	37	3	322	16

== Honours ==
Exeter City

- EFL League Two second-place promotion: 2021–22

Portsmouth

- EFL League One: 2023–24
