= Joel Randall =

English association football player (b. 1999)

Personal information
- Full name: Joel John Randall
- Date of birth: 29 October 1999 (age 27)
- Place of birth: Salisbury, England
- Height: 1.77 m (5 ft 10 in)
- Position: Midfielder

Team information
- Current team: Chesterfield (on loan from Bolton Wanderers)
- Number: 17

Youth career
- –2017: Exeter City

Senior career*
Years	Team	Apps	(Gls)
2017–2021	Exeter City	32	(8)
2018	→ Taunton Town (loan)	9	(1)
2018	→ Tiverton Town (loan)	5	(0)
2018–2019	→ Bideford (loan)	18	(6)
2019	→ Weston-super-Mare (loan)	14	(5)
2019	→ Weymouth (loan)	2	(0)
2021–2025	Peterborough United	82	(15)
2025–	Bolton Wanderers	34	(2)
2026	→ Blackpool (loan)	10	(0)
2026–	→ Chesterfield (loan)	0	(0)
- * Club domestic league appearances and goals as of 7 September 2026 (UTC)

Joel John Randall (born 29 October 1999) is an English professional footballer who plays as a midfielder for Chesterfield, on loan from EFL Championship club Bolton Wanderers.

== Career ==
Despite being a boyhood Southampton fan, Randall joined the Exeter City Academy at U11s after being spotted at one of the club's development centres. He started a scholarship with the club in the summer of 2016.

After progressing through the academy, Randall made his first-team debut in November 2017 during Exeter City's EFL Trophy tie against Chelsea U21s, replacing Jack Sparkes in the 62nd minute. Randall moved on loan to Taunton Town in January 2018, making his first appearance for the Peacocks in a 1–0 win over Swindon Supermarine. That same month, Randall was offered a professional contract by Exeter for the following season.

In July 2018, Randall joined Southern League Premier Division South side Tiverton Town on an initial six-month loan deal. However, he was recalled in November 2018. After being recalled by Exeter, Randall appeared for the club in their Checkatrade Trophy game with Bristol Rovers, netting his first goal for Exeter after stepping off the bench. Randall was an unused substitute two other times during the season's competition. In December 2018, he was loaned out to Bideford A.F.C. for the rest of the season.

On 1 August 2019, Randall was loaned out to Weston-super-Mare for six months. However, on 11 November 2019, he was recalled due to an injury crisis, to make up the numbers on the bench.

On 6 December 2019, Randall was loaned out to Weymouth for one month.

Randall made his first-team breakthrough at Exeter City in the 2020–21 season, scoring his first league goal away at Salford City in a 2–2 draw in September 2020 on the opening day of the season. He scored his first goal at home in a 2–0 win against Cambridge 3 weeks later. By the end of November, he had already scored six goals in League Two.

=== Peterborough United ===
In August 2021, Randall joined Peterborough United. He scored his first goal for Peterborough in an EFL Cup tie against Swindon Town on 8 August 2023.

=== Bolton Wanderers ===
On 9 January 2025, Randall signed for fellow League One side Bolton Wanderers for a "substantial undisclosed fee", reported by The Bolton News to be £1.2 million, on a three-and-a-half year deal. on 19 January 2026, he joined fellow League One side Blackpool on loan for the rest of the season, reuniting with Ian Evatt, who had signed him for Bolton but left the club two weeks later.

On 2 September 2026, Randall joined League Two side Chesterfield on a season-long loan deal.

== Personal life ==
Joel's father is former midfielder Adrian Randall, who played over 300 appearances for AFC Bournemouth, Aldershot, Burnley, York City and Bury, before ending his career at Forest Green Rovers.

== Career statistics ==
As of match played 26 December 2024

Appearances and goals by club, season and competition
Club	Season	League			FA Cup		League Cup		Other		Total	
Club	Season	Division	Apps	Goals	Apps	Goals	Apps	Goals	Apps	Goals	Apps	Goals
Exeter City	2017–18	League Two	0	0	0	0	0	0	1 (Note: Appearances in the EFL Trophy)	0	1	0
Exeter City	2018–19	League Two	0	0	—		0	0	1	1	1	1
Exeter City	2019–20	League Two	2	0	—		0	0	5	2	7	2
Exeter City	2020–21	League Two	30	8	3	2	1	0	2	0	36	10
Exeter City	Total		32	8	3	2	1	0	9	3	45	13
Taunton Town (loan)	2017–18	Southern League Division One West	9	1	—		—		1 (Note: Appearance in Southern League Championship Match)	1	10	2
Tiverton Town (loan)	2018–19	Southern League Premier Division South	5	0	2	0	—		4 (Note: Two appearances and one goal in the Southern League Cup, two appearances in the FA Trophy)	1	11	1
Bideford (loan)	2018–19	Southern League Division One South	18	6	—		—		2 (Note: Appearances in the Southern League Cup)	2	20	8
Weston-super-Mare (loan)	2019–20	Southern League Premier Division South	14	5	4	0	—		1 (Note: Appearance in the FA Trophy)	1	19	6
Weymouth (loan)	2019–20	National League South	2	0	—		—		—		2	0
Peterborough United	2021–22	Championship	11	0	0	0	1	0	—		12	0
Peterborough United	2022–23	League One	10	0	1	0	1	0	4	0	16	0
Peterborough United	2023–24	League One	43	10	4	1	1	1	8 (Note: Six appearances in the EFL Trophy, two appearances in the EFL League One play-offs.)	0	56	12
Peterborough United	2024–25	League One	18	5	2	2	1	0	4	0	25	7
Peterborough United	Total		82	15	7	3	4	1	16	0	109	19
Career total			162	35	16	5	5	1	33	8	216	49

== Honours ==
Peterborough United

- EFL Trophy: 2023–24
