= Nigel Atangana =

French footballer (born 1989)

Personal information
- Full name: Nigel Alfred Steven Atangana
- Date of birth: 9 September 1989 (age 37)
- Place of birth: Corbeil-Essonnes, France
- Height: 1.87 m (6 ft 2 in)
- Position: Defensive midfielder

Team information
- Current team: A.F.C. Stoneham

Youth career
- 1998–2003: Bry FC
- 2003–2005: St-Quentin-en-Yvelines
- 2005–2007: FC Flérien
- 2007–2008: Caen

Senior career*
Years	Team	Apps	(Gls)
2008–2009	Avranches	10	(0)
2009–2011	Dives	14	(0)
2011–2012	Riudellots	32	(3)
2012–2013	Gravelines	21	(1)
2013–2014	Havant & Waterlooville	43	(5)
2014–2016	Portsmouth	43	(1)
2016–2017	Leyton Orient	58	(0)
2017–2019	Cheltenham Town	58	(3)
2019–2022	Exeter City	66	(2)
2022–2024	Eastleigh	55	(0)
2024–2026	Havant & Waterlooville	27	(2)
2026–	A.F.C. Stoneham	0	(0)
- * Club domestic league appearances and goals as of 13:29, 24 April 2024 (UTC)

Nigel Alfred Steven Atangana (born 9 September 1989) is a French professional footballer who plays as a defensive midfielder for club A.F.C. Stoneham.

== Career ==
=== Early career ===
Born in Corbeil-Essonnes, Atangana made his senior debuts with US Avranches in CFA 2, after having trials at Luton Town, Gillingham, West Bromwich Albion and Grays Athletic. After subsequently representing SU Dives, he moved to Spain, joining Girona FC and being assigned to CF Riudellots, the club's farm team. Atangana was called up to the main squad in Segunda División in November 2011, but failed to appear with the club.

In the 2012 summer Atangana moved to US Gravelines Foot, also in France's fifth division. He appeared in 21 matches and scored once (the winner in a 2–1 home success against US Ailly-Sur-Somme on 1 December 2012).

=== Havant & Waterlooville ===
In September 2013, Atangana signed with Havant & Waterlooville. He made his debut on the 30th, starting in a 1–1 FA Trophy draw against Gloucester City.

Atangana made his league debut on 19 October, starting in a 0–0 draw against Dover Athletic. He scored his first goal for Hawks on 11 January of the following year, the game's only goal in a home win against Ebbsfleet United.

Atangana finished the season with 43 appearances and five goals, being named Havant & Waterlooville' Player of the Year.

=== Portsmouth ===
On 19 June 2014, Atangana signed a two-year contract with League Two side Portsmouth, for an undisclosed fee. He made his debut for the club on 9 August, coming on as a substitute for fellow debutant Craig Westcarr in a 1–1 away draw against Exeter City.

Atangana scored his first Pompey goal on 20 December, netting the equalizer in a 1–1 draw at Cheltenham Town. He appeared in 30 matches during the campaign, mainly due to the injury of starter James Dunne.

=== Leyton Orient ===
On 20 January 2016, Atangana joined Leyton Orient on an 18-month contract until the end of the 2016–17 season for an undisclosed fee. Atangana was given the number 15 upon arrival.

=== Cheltenham Town ===
On 28 May 2017, Atangana signed a two-year contract with League Two side Cheltenham Town. He officially joined the Robins on 1 July 2017 when his contract with Leyton Orient came to an end.

=== Exeter City ===
On 20 May 2019, he joined League Two team Exeter City Football Club after leaving Cheltenham Town following a long term Achilles injury. Upon breaking into the side after recovering, he quickly became a fan favourite for his solid defensive play and his consistently high work rate, earning the fan-voted Player of the Month award for December. He scored his first goal for the club in a 2–2 draw at home to Hartlepool United in the FA Cup first round. After the 2020–21 season, fans found out that he signed a three-year contract after Exeter's retained list stated he was under contract for the 2021–22 season. Atangana made 19 appearances, but was released at the end of the 2021–22 season following Exeter's promotion to League One.

=== Eastleigh ===
On 2 August 2022, Atangana joined National League club Eastleigh.

He departed the club on a free transfer at the end of the 2023–24 season.

=== Havant & Waterlooville ===
In June 2024, Atangana returned to Southern League Premier Division South club Havant & Waterlooville.

== Personal life ==
Atangana is of Cameroonian descent.

== Career statistics ==
As of end of 2023–24 season

Appearances and goals by club, season and competition
Club	Season	League			National cup		League cup		Other		Total	
Club	Season	Division	Apps	Goals	Apps	Goals	Apps	Goals	Apps	Goals	Apps	Goals
Avranches	2008–09	CFA 2	10	0	—		—		—		10	0
Dives	2009–10	CFA 2	11	0	—		—		—		11	0
Dives	2010–11	CFA 2	3	0	—		—		—		3	0
Dives	Total		14	0	0	0	0	0	0	0	14	0
Riudellots	2011–12	Segona Catalana	32	3	—		—		—		32	3
Gravelines	2012–13	CFA 2	21	1	—		—		—		21	1
Havant & Waterlooville	2013–14	Conference South	28	3	2	0	—		13 (Note: Nine appearances in the FA Trophy and four in the Hampshire Senior Cup)	2	43	5
Portsmouth	2014–15	League Two	30	1	2	0	1	0	2 (Note: Appearances in the Football League Trophy)	0	35	1
Portsmouth	2015–16	League Two	13	0	0	0	0	0	0	0	13	0
Portsmouth	Total		43	1	2	0	1	0	2	0	48	1
Leyton Orient	2015–16	League Two	29	0	0	0	0	0	0	0	29	0
Leyton Orient	2016–17	League Two	29	0	1	0	1	0	1	0	32	0
Leyton Orient	Total		58	0	1	0	1	0	1	0	61	0
Cheltenham Town	2017–18	League Two	32	1	0	0	2	0	1	0	35	1
Cheltenham Town	2018–19	League Two	26	2	3	0	1	0	4	0	34	2
Cheltenham Town	Total		58	3	3	0	3	0	5	0	69	3
Exeter City	2019–20	League Two	22	1	4	1	0	0	6 (Note: Three appearances in the Football League Trophy and three appearances in the EFL League Two play-offs)	0	32	2
Exeter City	2020–21	League Two	28	0	2	0	1	0	2	2	33	2
Exeter City	2021–22	League Two	16	1	1	0	1	0	1	0	19	1
Exeter City	Total		66	2	7	1	2	0	9	2	84	5
Eastleigh	2022–23	National League	18	0	2	0	—		1 (Note: Appearance(s) in FA Trophy)	0	21	0
Eastleigh	2023–24	National League	37	0	4	1	—		1	0	42	1
Eastleigh	Total		55	0	6	1	0	0	2	0	63	1
Career total			385	13	21	2	7	0	32	4	445	19
