= Louis Morison =

English association football player

Personal information
- Full name: Louis Morison
- Date of birth: 16 December 2001 (age 24)
- Place of birth: East Devon, England
- Position: Midfielder

Team information
- Current team: Exmouth Town

Youth career
- 2010–2020: Exeter City

Senior career*
Years	Team	Apps	(Gls)
2020–2021	Exeter City	0	(0)
2019–2020	→ Willand Rovers (loan)	6	(0)
2020	→ Tiverton Town (loan)	6	(3)
2021–2023	Tiverton Town	80	(18)
2023–	Exmouth Town	9	(1)
- * Club domestic league appearances and goals as of 21:21, 2 January 2024 (UTC)

Louis Morison (born 16 December 2001) is an English footballer who plays as a midfielder for Exmouth Town.

== Career ==
A member of Exeter City's youth academy since the U9's, Morison signed a professional contract with the club on 15 June 2020. Morison made his professional with Exeter City in a 3–2 EFL Cup win over Forest Green Rovers on 8 September 2020.

In September 2020, he signed for Tiverton Town on loan, making a total of nine appearances before the season was curtailed by the COVID-19 pandemic in the United Kingdom.

On 12 May 2021 it was announced that he would leave Exeter at the end of the season, following the expiry of his contract. A month later, it was announced by Tiverton Town that he would be joining the club on a permanent basis.

In 2023, Morison moved to Exmouth Town.
