= Jonny Maxted =

English footballer (born 1993)

Personal information
- Full name: Jonathan James Maxted
- Date of birth: 26 October 1993 (age 33)
- Place of birth: Tadcaster, England
- Height: 6 ft 0 in (1.83 m)
- Position: Goalkeeper

Team information
- Current team: Oxford City

Youth career
- Collingham
- Tadcaster Albion
- 1999–2012: Doncaster Rovers

Senior career*
Years	Team	Apps	(Gls)
2012–2014	Doncaster Rovers	0	(0)
2012	→ Goole (loan)		
2012	→ Gainsborough Trinity (loan)	1	(0)
2014–2015	Hartlepool United	0	(0)
2015–2016	Forest Green Rovers	20	(0)
2016	→ Guiseley (loan)	12	(0)
2016–2018	Guiseley	41	(0)
2018–2019	Accrington Stanley	20	(0)
2019–2021	Exeter City	26	(0)
2021–2023	Northampton Town	1	(0)
2023–2024	Newport County	4	(0)
2024–2026	Brackley Town	70	(0)
2026	→ Oxford City (loan)	5	(0)
2026–	Oxford City	0	(0)
- * Club domestic league appearances and goals as of 19:08, 27 May 2026 (UTC)

Jonathan James Maxted (born 26 October 1993) is an English professional footballer who plays as a goalkeeper for National League North club Oxford City.

== Early and personal life ==
Born in Tadcaster, North Yorkshire, Maxted grew up in Boston Spa. His uncle, Paul Maxted, also played as a goalkeeper for Guiseley.

== Career ==
=== Doncaster Rovers ===
After playing with Collingham and Tadcaster Albion, Maxted joined Doncaster Rovers at the age of 15. While with Doncaster he spent loan spells at Goole and Gainsborough Trinity.

=== Hartlepool, Forest Green Rovers and Guiseley ===
After leaving Doncaster he played for Hartlepool United, before moving to Forest Green Rovers in July 2015. He signed on loan for Guiseley in September 2016, making the move permanent in November 2016. In November 2017 his performances were credited with helping Guiseley reach the second round of the FA Cup for the first time in their history.

=== Accrington Stanley ===
Maxted signed for Accrington Stanley in January 2018. He made his Accrington Stanley debut on 2 April 2018, keeping a clean sheet in a 1–0 home win against Notts County. He served as a deputy to Connor Ripley in the 2018–19 season.

=== Exeter City ===
After failing to agree a new contract with Accrington, it was confirmed on 28 June 2019 that he would join Exeter City on 1 July 2019. He was nominated for January 2020 EFL League Two player of the month after keeping four consecutive clean sheets in the league. On 29 June 2020 he played for Exeter City in the behind closed doors League Two play-off final because of the COVID-19 pandemic at Wembley Stadium, missing out on promotion to League One with a 4–0 defeat to Northampton Town.

=== Northampton Town ===
On 12 May 2021 it was announced that he would leave Exeter at the end of the season, following the expiry of his contract. On 24 June 2021 it was announced that he would sign for Northampton Town. He was released by Northampton at the end of the 2022–23 season.

=== Newport County ===
On 28 July 2023, Maxted signed for Newport County. On 29 August 2023 Maxted made his debut for Newport in the starting line-up for the EFL Cup 1–1 draw against Brentford of the Premier League, which Brentford won on penalties. Maxted was released by Newport County at the end of the 2023–24 season.

=== Brackley Town ===
In June 2024 Maxted joined Brackley Town. He moved on loan to Oxford City in January 2026, being recalled in February.

=== Oxford City ===
On 27 May 2026, Maxted returned to National League North club Oxford City on a permanent deal following his loan spell the previous season.

== Honours ==
Brackley Town:

- National League North: 2024–25
