= 2017–18 Exeter City F.C. season =

Exeter City
2017–18 season
- Owner: Exeter City Supporters' Trust
- Chairman: Julian Tagg
- Manager: Paul Tisdale
- Stadium: St James Park
- League Two: 4th (lost play-off final)
- FA Cup: Eliminated in Third Round by West Bromwich Albion
- EFL Cup: Eliminated in First Round by Charlton
- EFL Trophy: Eliminated in Group Stage
- Top goalscorer: League: Jayden Stockley (20 goals); All: Jayden Stockley (25 goals)
- Highest home attendance: 5,645 (17 May 2018, vs. Lincoln City)
- Lowest home attendance: 1,294 (28 November 2017, vs. Chelsea under-21)
- Average home league attendance: 4,072
Home colours	Away colours	Third colours
- All statistics correct as of 28 May 2018.

The 2017–18 season was Exeter City's 116th year in existence and their sixth consecutive season in League Two, where they finished in fourth place. The Grecians progressed to and lost their second consecutive promotion play-off final City progressed to the third round of the FA Cup after beating 8th-tier Heybridge Swifts in the first round, and fellow League Two side Forest Green Rovers in a second round replay. Exeter were knocked out in the third round by Premier League side West Bromwich Albion. The Grecians were knocked out of the EFL Cup in the first round, losing at home to Charlton Athletic, and were also eliminated in the regionalised first round (group stage) of the EFL Trophy, finishing bottom of Southern Group D.

The season covers the period from 1 July 2017 to 30 June 2018.

== Transfers ==
=== Transfers in ===
Date from	Position	Nationality	Name	From	Fee	Ref.
1 July 2017	CB	(England)	Luke Croll	Crystal Palace	Free transfer	
1 July 2017	LB	(England)	Dean Moxey	Bolton Wanderers	Free transfer	
1 August 2017	CF	(England)	Ryan Brunt	Free agent	Free transfer	
31 August 2017	CF	(England)	Jayden Stockley	Aberdeen	Undisclosed	
31 August 2017	DM	(England)	Hiram Boateng	Crystal Palace	Free transfer	
1 December 2017	CB	(England)	Danny Seaborne	Free agent	Free transfer	

=== Transfers out ===
Date from	Position	Nationality	Name	To	Fee	Ref.
1 July 2017	CM	(England)	Tom McCready	AFC Fylde	Released	(Note: McCready joined AFC Fylde following his release.)
1 July 2017	CF	(Jamaica)	Joel Grant	Plymouth Argyle	Free transfer	
1 July 2017	DM	(England)	Matt Oakley	Retired as player, became assistant manager		
1 July 2017	GK	(Austria)	Bobby Olejnik	Mansfield Town	Released	(Note: Olejnik joined Mansfield Town following his release.)
1 July 2017	RB	(England)	Connor Riley-Lowe	Truro City	Released	(Note: Riley-Lowe joined Truro City following his release.)
1 July 2017	CF	(Republic of Ireland)	Ryan Swan	Cabinteely	Released	(Note: Ryan Swan joined Cabinteely following his release.)
1 July 2017	DM	(Wales)	Ethan Ampadu	Chelsea	Fee to be agreed	
18 July 2017	CF	(England)	Ollie Watkins	Brentford	Undisclosed (over £1.75 million)	
31 August 2017	RM	(England)	David Wheeler	Queens Park Rangers	Undisclosed	
20 October 2017	CF	(Northern Ireland)	Jamie Reid	Torquay United	Free transfer	
1 January 2018	CB	(England)	Toby Down	Taunton Town	Free transfer	
5 January 2018	CF	(England)	Reuben Reid	Forest Green Rovers	Undisclosed	

=== Loans in ===
Start date	Position	Nationality	Name	From	End date	Ref.
31 August 2017	RB	(England)	Kane Wilson	West Bromwich Albion	January 2018	
31 August 2017	CF	(England)	Kyle Edwards	West Bromwich Albion	January 2018	
4 January 2018	GK	(England)	Paul Jones	Norwich City	30 June 2018	
22 January 2018	CF	(England)	Ryan Loft	Tottenham Hotspur	30 June 2018	

=== Loans out ===
Note: this section may be inaccurate, due to incomplete information released by the club about loans out.

Start date	Position	Nationality	Name	To	End date	Ref.
1 July 2017	CF	(Northern Ireland)	Jamie Reid	Torquay United	20 October 2017 (Note: Reid was originally going to remain on loan until January 2018, but was released by Exeter City on 20 October 2017 and immediately joined Torquay on a permanent basis.)	
4 July 2017	CB	(England)	Toby Down	Weymouth	31 December 2017	
10 July 2017	CB	(England)	Kyle Egan	Dorchester Town	Unknown	
10 July 2017	CM	(England)	Jordan Storey	Dorchester Town	October 2017 (Note: Storey was recalled from his loan in late October 2017.)	
14 July 2017	LB	(England)	Alex Hartridge	Truro City	30 June 2018	
18 July 2017	FW	(England)	Ben Seymour	Weston-super-Mare	28 September 2017	
7 August 2017	FW	(England)	Archie Collins	Weston-super-Mare	7 October 2017	
August 2017	FW	(Wales)	Max Smallcombe	Bideford	Unknown	
October 2017	FW	(England)	Ben Seymour	Bideford	January 2018	
18 December 2017	FW	(England)	Archie Collins	Dorchester Town	18 February 2018	
4 January 2018	GK	(Guernsey)	James Hamon	Gloucester City	April 2018	
19 January 2018	RB	(England)	Sam Haynes	Barnstaple Town	19 February 2018	
22 January 2018	FW	(England)	Joel Randall	Taunton Town	Unknown	
31 January 2018	CM	(England)	Josh Key	Bideford	Unknown	

== Pre-season ==
Exeter City played five pre-season fixtures in July 2017, all away from home at teams based in Somerset and Dorset. The club's pre-season schedule began with a trip to Twerton Park, where they faced off against Bath City for the Brian Lomax SD Cup – an annual fixture held between two supporter-owned clubs.

There were no pre-season friendlies at St James Park due to redevelopment work taking place over the summer.

=== Brian Lomax SD Cup ===
14 July 2017	Bath City	0–2	Exeter City	Bath, Somerset, England
19:30 BST		Report	Taylor 72'; Harley 74'	Stadium: Twerton Park; Attendance: 330

=== Friendlies ===
18 July 2017	Weymouth	1–0	Exeter City	Weymouth, Dorset, England
19:30 BST	McCarthy 5'	Report		Stadium: Bob Lucas Stadium; Attendance: 412

20 July 2017	Taunton Town	0–3	Exeter City	Taunton, Somerset, England
19:45 BST		Report	Harvey (trailist) 18'; McAlinden 72'; Brunt (trialist) 85'	Stadium: Viridor Stadium; Attendance: 1,073

25 July 2017	Poole Town	2–0	Exeter City	Poole, Dorset, England
19:30 BST	Burbridge 14'; Balmer 90'	Report		Stadium: Tatnam Ground; Attendance: 285

29 July 2017	Dorchester Town	1–6	Exeter City	Dorchester, Dorset, England
15:00 BST	Trialist 86'	Report	Wheeler 24'; Reid 28'; Taylor 44'; James 53'; Sweeney 67'; Sparkes 82'	Stadium: Avenue Stadium

== Competitions ==
=== League Two ===
==== League table ====
Pos	Team	Pld	W	D	L	GF	GA	GD	Pts	Promotion, qualification or relegation
2	Luton Town (P)	46	25	13	8	94	46	+48	88	Promotion to EFL League One
3	Wycombe Wanderers (P)	46	24	12	10	79	60	+19	84	Promotion to EFL League One
4	Exeter City	46	24	8	14	64	54	+10	80	Qualification for League Two play-offs (Note: Four teams play for one spot and promotion to EFL League One.)
5	Notts County	46	21	14	11	71	48	+23	77	Qualification for League Two play-offs
6	Coventry City (O, P)	46	22	9	15	64	47	+17	75	Qualification for League Two play-offs

Source: BBC Sport
Rules for classification: 1) Points; 2) Goal difference; 3) Number of goals scored
(O) Play-off winners; (P) Promoted

=== Matches ===
The fixtures for the 2017–18 season were announced on 21 June 2017.

==== August ====
5 August 2017 1	Exeter City	1–0	Cambridge United	Exeter
15:00 BST	Reid 5'	Report		Stadium: St James Park; Attendance: 4,282; Referee: Trevor Kettle

12 August 2017 2	Swindon Town	1–1	Exeter City	Swindon
15:00 BST	Woolery 56'	Report	McAlinden 27'	Stadium: County Ground; Attendance: 7,795 (807 away); Referee: Darren Drysdale

19 August 2017 3	Exeter City	1–0	Lincoln City	Exeter
15:00 BST	Reid 42'	Report		Stadium: St James Park; Attendance: 3,980; Referee: Craig Hicks

26 August 2017 4	Cheltenham Town	3–4	Exeter City	Cheltenham
15:00 BST	Dawson 8', 12'; Holman 90+1'	Report	Moore-Taylor 39'; Reid 45+1', 77' (pen.); Taylor 78'	Stadium: Whaddon Road; Attendance: 3,168 (774 away); Referee: Anthony Backhouse

==== September ====
2 September 2017 5	Exeter City	1–0	Newport County	Exeter
15:00 BST	Holmes 57'	Report		Stadium: St James Park; Attendance: 4,193; Referee: John Brookes

9 September 2017 6	Forest Green Rovers	1–3	Exeter City	Nailsworth
15:00 BST	Mullings 75'	Report	Sweeney 4'; Reid 18', 53'	Stadium: The New Lawn; Attendance: 2,909 (817 away); Referee: Robert Lewis

12 September 2017 7	Barnet	1–2	Exeter City	Edgware
20:00 BST	Coulthirst 48'	Report	Reid 78'; Stockley 90+4'	Stadium: The Hive; Attendance: 1,605 (376 away); Referee: Graham Horwood

16 September 2017 8	Exeter City	3–0	Crewe Alexandra	Exeter
15:00 BST	Tillson 7'; Taylor 38', 76'	Report		Stadium: St James Park; Attendance: 4,218; Referee: Anthony Coggins

23 September 2017 9	Coventry City	2–0	Exeter City	Coventry
15:00 BST	Brown 58' (o.g.); Kelly-Evans 90+1'	Report		Stadium: Ricoh Arena; Attendance: 8,340 (1,221 away); Referee: Robert Jones

26 September 2017 10	Exeter City	0–3	Notts County	Exeter
19:45 BST		Report	Alessandra 2'; Grant 61', 82'	Stadium: St James Park; Attendance: 4,760; Referee: Kevin Johnson

30 September 2017 11	Exeter City	4–1	Morecambe	Exeter
15:00 BST	Brown 20'; Stockley 24', 45+6'; Moxey 48'	Report	Oliver 38'	Stadium: St James Park; Attendance: 3,651; Referee: Brett Huxtable

==== October ====
7 October 2017 12	Carlisle United	0–1	Exeter City	Carlisle
15:00 BST		Report	Sweeney 49'	Stadium: Brunton Park; Attendance: 4,677 (233 away); Referee: Eddie Ilderton

14 October 2017 13	Wycombe Wanderers	0–0	Exeter City	High Wycombe
15:00 BST		Report		Stadium: Adams Park; Attendance: 5,006 (500 away); Referee: Robert Jone

17 October 2017 14	Exeter City	1–4	Luton Town	Exeter
19:45 BST	Taylor 21'	Report	Collins 8'; Potts 46'; Hylton 52'; Cornick 55'	Stadium: St James Park; Attendance: 4,209; Referee: James Linington

21 October 2017 15	Exeter City	0–1	Port Vale	Exeter
15:00 BST		Report	Pope 25'	Stadium: St James Park; Attendance: 4,258; Referee: Craig Hicks

28 October 2017 16	Mansfield Town	1–1	Exeter City	Mansfield
15:00 BST	Hemmings 18'	Report	Holmes 86'	Stadium: Field Mill; Attendance: 3,608 (360 away); Referee: Anthony Backhouse

==== November ====
11 November 2017 17	Exeter City	2–0	Grimsby Town	Exeter
15:00 UTC	Stockley 29'; McAlinden 53'	Report		Stadium: St James Park; Attendance: 3,854; Referee: Dean Whitestone

18 November 2017 18	Chesterfield	1–0	Exeter City	Chesterfield
15:00 UTC	Dennis 50'	Report		Stadium: Proact Stadium; Attendance: 5,195 (322 away); Referee: Martin Coy

21 November 2017 19	Crawley Town	3–1	Exeter City	Crawley
19:45 UTC	Payne 34' (pen.); Roberts 60', 81'	Report	Moxey 23'	Stadium: Broadfield Stadium; Attendance: 1,580 (321 away); Referee: Andy Haines

25 November 2017 20	Exeter City	2–0	Accrington Stanley	Exeter
15:00 UTC	Boateng 45+2'; Sweeney 86' (pen.)	Report		Stadium: St James Park; Attendance: 3,569; Referee: John Brooks

==== December ====
9 December 2017 21	Colchester United	3–1	Exeter City	Colchester
15:00 UTC	James 23' (o.g.); Szmodics 26' (pen.), 30'	Report	Stockley 62'	Stadium: Weston Homes Community Stadium; Attendance: 3,049 (278 away); Referee: Darren Drysdale

16 December 2017 22	Exeter City	2–1	Stevenage	Exeter
15:00 UTC	James 53'; Sweeney 71'	Report	Godden 80'	Stadium: St James Park; Attendance: 3,448; Referee: Trevor Kettle

23 December 2017 23	Yeovil Town	3–1	Exeter City	Yeovil
15:00 UTC	Gray 41'; Zoko 47'; Surridge 88' (pen.)	Report	Stockley 85'	Stadium: Huish Park; Attendance: 4,834 (1,506 away); Referee: Lee Swabey

26 December 2017	Exeter City	Abandoned	Forest Green Rovers	Exeter
15:00 UTC				Stadium: St James Park; Attendance: 4,107; Referee: Brett Huxtable

30 December 2017 24	Exeter City	2–1	Barnet	Exeter
15:00 UTC	Wilson 30'; Taylor 90+1'	Report	Watson 69'	Stadium: St James Park; Attendance: 3,869; Referee: Kevin Johnson

==== January ====
1 January 2018 25	Newport County	2–1	Exeter City	Newport, Wales
15:00 UTC	Amond 6'; Willmott 66'	Report	Stockley 52'	Stadium: Rodney Parade; Attendance: 3,318 (499 away); Referee: Graham Horwood

13 January 2018 26	Exeter City	1–0	Coventry City	Exeter
15:00 UTC	Harley 7'	Report		Stadium: St James Park; Attendance: 4,219; Referee: Ben Toner

20 January 2018 27	Notts County	1–2	Exeter City	Nottingham
15:00 UTC	Stead 73' (pen.)	Report	Taylor 8'; Stockley 42'	Stadium: Meadow Lane; Attendance: 6,677 (428 away); Referee: Antony Coggins

31 January 2018 28	Exeter City	2–0	Forest Green Rovers	Exeter
19:45 UTC	Stockley 51'; Sweeney 57' (pen.)	Report		Stadium: St James Park; Attendance: 3,382; Referee: Brett Huxtable

==== February ====
3 February 2018 29	Luton Town	1–0	Exeter City	Luton
15:00 UTC	Cornick 38'	Report		Stadium: Kenilworth Road; Attendance: 8,788 (464 away); Referee: Andy Woolmer

10 February 2018 30	Exeter City	1–1	Wycombe Wanderers	Exeter
15:00 GMT	James 12' (yellow card) 90+3'; Sweeney (yellow card) 61'; Holmes (yellow card) 64'	Report	Bean 53'	Stadium: St James Park; Attendance: 3,956; Referee: Steve Martin

13 February 2018	Port Vale	Postponed	Exeter City	Burslem
19:45 GMT				Stadium: Vale Park

17 February 2018 31	Exeter City	0–1	Mansfield Town	Exeter
15:00 GMT	Kane Wilson (yellow card) 44'; Harley (yellow card) 85'; Moxey (yellow card) 90+5'	Report	Rose 38'	Stadium: St James Park; Attendance: 3,680; Referee: Christopher Sarginson

20 February 2018 32	Crewe Alexandra	1–2	Exeter City	Crewe
19:45 GMT	Miller (yellow card) 67', (goal) 88'; Raynes (yellow card) 78'	Report	Stockley (yellow card) 78', (goal) 90+5'; Pym (yellow card) 89'; Moore-Taylor 90+2'	Stadium: Gresty Road; Attendance: 3,081; Referee: Ben Toner

24 February 2018 33	Grimsby Town	0–1	Exeter City	Cleethorpes
15:00 GMT	Dixon (yellow card) 73'	Report	Stockley 37' (pen.); Wilson (yellow card) 68' (yellow-red card) 81'; Moore-Taylor (yellow card) 79'	Stadium: Blundell Park; Attendance: 4,151; Referee: Andy Haines

==== March ====
10 March 2018 34	Exeter City	1–1	Carlisle United	Exeter
15:00 GMT	Moxey 42'	Report	Joyce (yellow card) 20'; Liddle (yellow card) 40'; Nadesan 64'	Stadium: St. James Park; Attendance: 3,488; Referee: John Busby

13 March 2018 35	Exeter City	0–0	Yeovil Town	Exeter
19:45 GMT	Harley (yellow card) 81'	Report	Green (yellow card) 43'; Donnellan (yellow card) 72'	Stadium: St. James Park; Attendance: 3,913; Referee: Keith Stroud

17 March 2018 36	Morecambe	2–1	Exeter City	Morecambe
15:00 GMT	McGowan (yellow card) 36'; Lavelle 43'; Rose 78'	Report	Sweeney 37'; Moxey (yellow card) 45+2'	Stadium: Globe Arena; Attendance: 1,056; Referee: Carl Boyeson

20 March 2018 37	Port Vale	0–1	Exeter City	Burslem
19:45 GMT	Hannant (yellow card) 65'	Report	Storey 24'	Stadium: Vale Park; Attendance: 3,138; Referee: Dean Whitestone

24 March 2018 38	Exeter City	3–1	Swindon Town	Exeter
15:00 GMT	Moxey (yellow card) 12'; Taylor 33'; Sweeney 44' (pen.); Stockley 87'	Report	Woolery 27'; Taylor (yellow card) 45'; Robertson (yellow card) 90+1'	Stadium: St James Park; Attendance: 4,567; Referee: Lee Collins

30 March 2018 39	Lincoln City	3–2	Exeter City	Lincoln
15:00 BST	Rowe 60'; Green 62'; Palmer 86', (yellow card) 87'	Report	Stockley 10'; Taylor 78'; Simpson (yellow card) 90'	Stadium: Sincil Bank; Attendance: 9,785; Referee: Tom Nield

==== April ====
2 April 2018 40	Exeter City	2–1	Cheltenham Town	Exeter
	Simpson 42'; Storey 81'	Report	Winchester 37'; Chatzitheodoridis (yellow card) 68'	Stadium: St James Park; Attendance: 4,420; Referee: Charles Breakspear

7 April 2018 41	Cambridge United	2–3	Exeter City	Cambridge
15:00 BST	Ibehre 42'; Maris 67'	Report	Stockley 59'; Jay 84'; Taylor 87'	Stadium: Abbey Stadium; Attendance: 4,054; Referee: Martin Coy

14 April 2018 42	Accrington Stanley	1–1	Exeter City	Accrington
15:00 BST	Jackson 38'; Conneely (yellow card) 80'	Report	Stockley 21'	Stadium: Crown Ground; Attendance: 3,135; Referee: Oliver Langford

17 April 2018 43	Exeter City	2–1	Chesterfield	Exeter
19:45 BST	Taylor (yellow card) 27'; Stockley 39'; Whitmore 74' (o.g.)	Report	Kellett 84'; Rowley (yellow card) 90+5'	Stadium: St James Park; Attendance: 3,560; Referee: Brendan Malone

21 April 2018 44	Exeter City	2–2	Crawley Town	Exeter
15:00 BST	Stockley 42', 57'; James (yellow card) 72'; Wilson (yellow card) 73'	Report	Boldewijn 29', (yellow card) 64'; Young (yellow card) 65'; Yorwerth 66'	Stadium: St James Park; Attendance: 3,998; Referee: Antony Coggins

28 April 2018 45	Stevenage	3–1	Exeter City	Stevenage
15:00 BST	Revell 14', 31', 49'; Godden (yellow card) 41'; Georgiou (yellow card) 90+5'	Report	Croll (yellow card) 40'; Moxey (yellow card) 44'; Sweeney 78' (pen.)	Stadium: Broadhall Way; Attendance: 3,399; Referee: Dean Whitestone

===== May =====
5 May 2018 46	Exeter City	1–0	Colchester United	Exeter
15:00 BST	Simpson 71'	Report	Gondoh (yellow card) 33'; Szomdics (penalty missed) 60'	Stadium: St James Park; Attendance: 4,615; Referee: Charles Breakspear

==== League Two play-offs ====
12 May 2018 Semi final (1st leg)	Lincoln City	0–0	Exeter City	Lincoln
15:00 BST	Palmer (yellow card) 90'	Report		Stadium: Sincil Bank; Attendance: 9,509; Referee: Ben Toner

17 May 2018 Semi final (2nd leg)	Exeter City	3–1 (3–1 agg.)	Lincoln City	Exeter
19:45 BST	Stockley 27', (yellow card) 89'; Boateng 47'; Harley 69'; Moxey (yellow card) 90'	Report	Eardley (yellow card) 18'; Green 78'; Bostwick (yellow card) 83'	Stadium: St James' Park; Attendance: 5,645; Referee: Darren England

28 May 2018 Final	Coventry City	3–1	Exeter City	London
15:00 BST	Willis 49'; Shipley 54'; Grimmer 68'	Report	Edwards 89'	Stadium: Wembley Stadium; Attendance: 50,196; Referee: David Webb

=== FA Cup ===
On 16 October 2017, the Grecians were drawn at home to Heybridge Swifts in the first round of the FA Cup.

City eventually overcame the Swifts 3–1 with all the goals being scored in the final 45 minutes after an uneventful first half. Jayden Stockley scored a quick brace before Heybridges' Sam Bantick scored a consolation. Liam McAlinden then sealed the win for Exeter in the 86th minute. The following day, the Grecians were drawn away to Forest Green Rovers for the second round.

Prolific goalscorer Christian Doidge netted for Rovers after 26 minutes, the only goal in the first half. Grecians skipper Jordan Moore-Taylor equalised in the 58th minute and Jayden Stockley scored not long after to give City a 2–1 lead. However, Forest Green equalised through Scott Laird in the 88th minute and Doidge scored again in the 92nd to turn the game on its head. To make the game's conclusion even more dramatic, Stockley scored his second goal in the 94th minute as the match finished 3–3.

The Grecians achieved an incredible comeback from a goal and a man down to triumph 2–1 in the replay to set a Third Round tie against Premier League side West Bromwich Albion. Forest Green had opened the scoring with a 30th-minute penalty scored by Christian Doidge. City were down to ten men after 63 minutes due to Jordan Tillson's second yellow card. However, Rovers conceded a penalty only ten minutes later and Pierce Sweeney converted. The score was 1–1 at the end of 90 minutes, and the next significant event was a second sending off, this time the culprit being Rovers defender Manny Monthé, leaving both teams with ten men. Jayden Stockley scored the winner in the 115th minute, netting his 11th goal of the season.

City's third round tie against West Bromwich Albion started very poorly, conceding after only 75 seconds after Christy Pym failed to keep Salomón Rondón's long-distance shot out. The Baggies scored again in the 25th minute through Jay Rodriguez. The BBC match report attributed both goals to mistakes by Danny Seaborne.

5 November 2017 1st round	Exeter City	3–1	Heybridge Swifts	Exeter
14:00 UTC	Stockley 59', 63'; McAlinden 86'	Report	Bantick 70'	Stadium: St James Park; Attendance: 3,004; Referee: Neil Hair

2 December 2017 2nd round	Forest Green Rovers	3–3	Exeter City	Nailsworth
15:00 UTC	Doidge 26', 90+2'; Laird 88'	Report	Moore-Taylor 58'; Stockley 64', 90+4'	Stadium: The New Lawn; Attendance: 2,250 (897 away); Referee: Gavin Ward

12 December 2017 Replay	Exeter City	2–1	Forest Green Rovers	Exeter
19:45 GMT	Sweeney 73' (pen.); Stockley 115'	Report	Doidge 30' (pen.)	Stadium: St James Park; Attendance: 2,923; Referee: Charles Breakspear

6 January 2018 Third round	Exeter City	0–2	West Bromwich Albion	Exeter
15:00 GMT		Report	Rondón 2'; Rodriguez 25'	Stadium: St James Park; Attendance: 5,638; Referee: Lee Mason

=== EFL Cup ===
On 16 June 2017, Exeter City were drawn at home to Charlton Athletic in the first round of the EFL Cup. Lee Holmes opened the scoring for the Grecians after 54 minutes by netting a free kick. However, goals by Billy Clarke and Regan Charles-Cook saw the Reds eliminated in the first round for the first time since 2014.

8 August 2017 First round	Exeter City	1–2	Charlton Athletic	Exeter
19:45 BST	Holmes 54'	Report	Clarke 72'; Charles-Cook 79'	Stadium: St James Park; Attendance: 2,699; Referee: Tim Robinson

=== EFL Trophy ===
City were placed in the Southern Group D, alongside the other two southwesternmost EFL League One and Two teams Plymouth Argyle and Yeovil Town. The Chelsea F.C. Academy was announced to be the other side in the group. On 13 July 2017, it was revealed that the Grecians would play Chelsea and Yeovil Town at home and Plymouth Argyle away.

City began with a 3–1 loss at home to Yeovil Town, when City failed to repeat the heroics of the previous season against the same opposition by coming back from 3–0 down, with just the consolation goal from Jack Sparkes, his first in professional football. The Grecians' second match of the group stage took place at Plymouth's Home Park, where they lost 5–3 on penalties to the Pilgrims after a 2–2 draw. City's elimination was confirmed after a 3–1 loss at home to Chelsea under-21s.

==== Table ====
Pos	Lge	Team	Pld	W	PW	PL	L	GF	GA	GD	Pts	Qualification
1	L2	Yeovil Town (Q)	3	2	1	0	0	6	3	+3	8	Round 2
2	ACA	Chelsea U21 (Q)	3	1	0	2	0	6	4	+2	5	Round 2
3	L1	Plymouth Argyle (E)	3	0	2	0	1	5	6	−1	4	
4	L2	Exeter City (E)	3	0	0	1	2	4	8	−4	1	

Updated to match(es) played on 28 November 2017. Source: EFL.com
(E) Eliminated; (Q) Qualified to the phase indicated

==== Results ====
29 August 2017 Group stage	Exeter City	1–3	Yeovil Town	Exeter
19:45 BST	Sparkes 80'	Report	Surridge 49'; Browne 75'; Khan 78'	Stadium: St James Park; Attendance: 1,509

3 October 2017 Group stage	Plymouth Argyle	2–2 (5–3 p)	Exeter City	Plymouth
19:45 BST	Ryan Edwards 19'; Blissett 75'	Report	McAlinden 13'; Kyle Edwards 70'	Stadium: Home Park; Attendance: 3,800 (286 away)
	Penalties
	Wylde (penalty scored); Jervis (penalty scored); Sarcevic (penalty scored); Lameiras (penalty scored); Çiftçi (penalty scored)		(penalty missed) James; (penalty scored) Jay; (penalty scored) Sweeney; (penalty scored) Taylor

28 November 2017 Group stage	Exeter City	1–3	Chelsea U-21	Exeter
19:45 UTC	Reid 7'	Report	Hudson-Odoi 29'; James 68'; Grant 83'	Stadium: St James Park; Attendance: 1,294
