= 2016–17 Exeter City F.C. season =

Exeter City
2016–17 season
- Owner: Exeter City Supporters' Trust
- Chairman: Julian Tagg
- Manager: Paul Tisdale
- Stadium: St James Park
- League Two: 5th (Lost play-off final)
- FA Cup: Knocked out in First Round by Luton Town
- EFL Cup: Knocked out in Second Round by Hull City
- EFL Trophy: Knocked out in Southern Group C (3rd place)
- Top goalscorer: League: David Wheeler (19 goals); All: David Wheeler (21 goals)
- Highest home attendance: 7,450 vs. Carlisle United
- Lowest home attendance: 729 vs. Swindon Town
- Average home league attendance: 4,300
Home colours	Away colours	Third colours
- All statistics correct as of 28 May 2017.

The 2016–17 season was Exeter City's 115th year in existence and their fifth consecutive season in League Two. Along with competing in League Two, the club also participated in the FA Cup, EFL Cup and EFL Trophy. Exeter finished the season in 5th place, qualifying for the promotion play-offs. In September, Exeter City broke their all-time record for consecutive home league losses by losing their first five home matches of the season. Exeter City did not record their first league win at their home ground St James Park until mid-December, after 10 attempts. A dramatic upturn in form saw the team rise from the bottom of the league table to a high of 4th. From 31 December 2016 to 4 February 2017, Exeter won all seven of their fixtures, with David Wheeler scoring in each match. With this feat, he equalled and then broke records set by Henry Poulter, Roderick Williams and Alan Beer. Two other records were broken this season because no Exeter City team had ever won seven league games in a row (during the same season). Exeter City also broke their record for most away wins in the league within one season, after their twelfth away triumph at Mansfield Town on 1 April. This season was first in which City qualified for the promotion play-offs in League Two since their relegation from League One in 2012. Exeter overcame Carlisle United to qualify for the play-off final against Blackpool at Wembley. Blackpool beat Exeter 2–1 in the play-off final to earn promotion to the 2017–18 EFL League One.

The season covered the period from 1 July 2016 to 30 June 2017.

== Transfers ==
=== Transfers in ===
Date from	Position	Nationality	Name	From	Fee	Ref.
1 July 2016	CB	(England)	Troy Archibald-Henville	Carlisle United	Free transfer	
1 July 2016	DM	(Wales)	Lloyd James	Leyton Orient	Free transfer	
1 July 2016	CF	(Republic of Ireland)	Liam McAlinden	Wolverhampton Wanderers	Free transfer	
1 July 2016	CF	(England)	Robbie Simpson	Cambridge United	Free transfer	
28 July 2016	CB	(Republic of Ireland)	Pierce Sweeney	Free agent	Free transfer	
13 September 2016	CF	(England)	Reuben Reid	Free agent	Free transfer	
21 February 2017	CF	(Republic of Ireland)	Ryan Swan	Free agent	Free transfer	

=== Transfers out ===
Date from	Position	Nationality	Name	To	Fee	Ref.
1 July 2016	LM	(Wales)	Arron Davies	Accrington Stanley	Free transfer	
1 July 2016	CF	(England)	Will Hoskins	Free agent	Released	
1 July 2016	CB	(Scotland)	Jamie McAllister	Bristol City (Note: Retired as player, hired as U–21 manager)	Free transfer	
1 July 2016	CF	(Republic of Ireland)	Clinton Morrison	Redditch United (Note: Following Morrison's release, he signed for Redditch United.)	Released	
1 July 2016	RW	(England)	Alex Nicholls	Barnet	Free transfer	
1 July 2016	CM	(Scotland)	David Noble	St Albans City	Free transfer	
1 July 2016	CM	(England)	Emmanuel Oyeleke	Aldershot Town (Note: Following Oyeleke's release, he signed for Aldershot Town.)	Released	
1 July 2016	CM	(England)	Jason Pope	Weston-super-Mare (Note: Following Pope's release, he signed for Weston-super-Mare.)	Released	
1 July 2016	RB	(Wales)	Christian Ribeiro	Oxford United	Free transfer	

=== Loans in ===
Date from	Position	Nationality	Name	From	Date until	Ref.
31 August 2016	CM	(England)	Jack Stacey	Reading	30 June 2017	
31 August 2016	CB	(England)	Luke Croll	Crystal Palace	30 June 2017	

=== Loans out ===
Date from	Position	Nationality	Name	To	Date until	Ref.
25 July 2016	CF	(Northern Ireland)	Jamie Reid	Torquay United	30 June 2017	
17 January 2017	CB	(England)	Toby Down	Weymouth	17 February 2017	
1 February 2017	LB	(England)	Connor Riley-Lowe	Truro City	1 March 2017	
10 February 2017	CM	(England)	Alex Byrne	Truro City	10 March 2017	

== Pre-season ==
On 19 May 2016, seven friendlies were announced on the club website. The majority were played against non-league West Country teams, but City also played Bristol Rovers, Burton Albion and a Cardiff City XI, the former of League One and the latter two of the Championship. City won all seven of the pre-season friendlies, conceding only two goals.

8 July 2016 Friendly	Weymouth	0–2	Exeter City	Weymouth
19:45 BST		Report	Moore-Taylor 44'; Simpson 72'	Stadium: Bob Lucas Stadium; Attendance: 441

16 July 2016 Friendly	Exeter City	2–0	Bristol Rovers	Exeter
15:00 BST	Holmes 7'; Watkins 37'	Report		Stadium: St James Park; Attendance: 1,247

19 July 2016 Friendly	Bodmin Town	0–4	Exeter City	Bodmin
19:45 BST		Report	Simpson 8'; Harley 27'; Taylor 28'; Egan 73'	Stadium: Priory Park; Referee: Simon Long

21 July 2016 Friendly	Truro City	1–2	Exeter City	Truro
19:45 BST	Crago 45+4'	Report	Reid 45+5'; McAlinden 88'	Stadium: Treyew Road; Attendance: 273

22 July 2016 Friendly	Exeter City	1–0	Burton Albion	Exeter
19:30 BST	Watkins 56'	Report		Stadium: St James Park; Attendance: 768; Referee: Kevin Johnson

26 July 2016 Friendly	Taunton Town	1–2	Exeter City	Taunton
19:45 BST	Veal 77'		Wheeler 45'; Riley-Lowe 60'	Stadium: Viridor Stadium; Attendance: 562

28 July 2016 Friendly	Exeter City	3–0	Cardiff City XI	Exeter
19:30 BST	Holmes 28'; Simpson 52', 65'	Report		Stadium: St James Park; Attendance: 1,166; Referee: Brendan Malone

== Competitions ==
=== League Two ===
==== Season summary ====
===== August =====
Exeter City began the season with an away fixture against Blackpool, which resulted in a 2–0 loss for the Grecians. Then followed two consecutive home fixtures, both of which the Grecians went on to lose. Against Hartlepool United, City were up 1–0 at half-time thanks to a 31st-minute goal from Liam McAlinden, but conceded two goals within just two minutes in the final half-hour to lose 2–1. The Grecians also went down to a late goal four days later versus Crawley Town, when Josh Yorwerth scored in the 83rd minute. After these three opening losses, City were bottom of the table. Up next was a trip to Accrington Stanley, where the Grecians won their first league match thanks to two goals in a frantic six minutes in the second half. Ryan Harley opened the scoring for Exeter in the 66th minute before Arron Davies (who left Exeter City in the summer after his contract expired) equalised four minutes later. City were very quickly back ahead when Jake Taylor scored the winning goal in the 72nd minute. The Grecians lost their final August fixture at home to promotion-chasing Portsmouth because of an 85th-minute penalty, but City again failed to take their chances. City scored only three goals in August, picking up a mere three points from five matches. The Grecians sat in the relegation zone at 23rd place, ahead only of Cambridge United.

===== September =====
Exeter City's first fixture of September was a tit-for-tat match away at Colchester United. Robbie Simpson scored his first and only league goal since signing in the summer to open the scoring. However City were 2–1 down at half-time, but goals from Ollie Watkins and Joel Grant sealed a narrow win for the Grecians, their second of the season in League Two. City's next match was at Crewe Alexandra and lost this game 2–0 to goals either side of half-time. Then followed the Devon Derby against rivals Plymouth Argyle which City also lost 2–0 with both goals coming early on in the game, causing Exeter to slip back into the relegation zone. Exeter City bounced back out of relegation zone by picking up their third win of the 2016–17 League Two season away at Stevenage with two quickfire goals in the second half from Lee Holmes and Ollie Watkins. City's miserable start to the season was made worse by a record-breaking streak of home losses. After a 2–0 loss at home to Notts County in which the opposition scored two early goals much like Plymouth Argyle a week earlier, the Grecians had lost every one of their first five home matches. However, the two wins away from home that month saw City out of the relegation zone, finishing the month's action in 22nd place.

===== October =====
The Grecians fared slightly better in October despite an opening 1–0 away loss at Wycombe Wanderers after a late goal from Adebayo Akinfenwa. City finally picked up their first point at home on 8 October with a goalless draw with Grimsby Town in which goalkeeper Bobby Olejnik didn't feature on the starting line-up for only the second time in over 50 league matches. Instead, Christy Pym featured in goal and would stay in the starting lineup for months to come. In contrast to the Grecians' poor start to the season, City thumped Barnet 4–1 in the following fixture away from home. The League Two top scorer at the time John Akinde opened the scoring for the opposition before Jake Taylor equalized just before half-time. After the break, City scored another three goals while former Grecian Alex Nicholls failed to find the back of net. Despite this heavy win, City once again lost at home the following week to Cambridge United to two early goals, with Joel Grant scoring a consolation goal towards the end of the match. Like their previous away fixture, the Grecians picked up another strong win at Morecambe, with first-half goals from David Wheeler, Joel Grant and Lee Holmes. By the end of October, the Grecians had earned 16 points, 15 of these away from home and stood at 19th in the league table, six points below the play-off places and one point above the relegation zone.

===== November =====
The Grecians' first league game of the month was a 3–1 loss to Doncaster Rovers. Reuben Reid opened the scoring in the 51st minute by converting a penalty kick but City conceded three goals in the final twenty minutes of the match, subsequently dropping back into the relegation zone. Exeter City also threw away a result the following week at Carlisle United, going behind in stoppage time to lose 3–2. Reid again opened the scoring, after only 40 seconds, but Charlie Wyke equalized. Lee Holmes then regained the lead for Exeter after 54 until Shaun Miller equalized in the 89th minute. Wyke scored the winner in the seventh minute of stoppage time. After two consecutive losses, the Grecians were bottom of the table for the first time since mid-August. City escaped from the drop zone the following Tuesday after their sixth away league win of the season, at Leyton Orient. The Grecians won 1–0 after a first-half Ollie Watkins goal. Orient manager Alberto Cavasin was sacked soon after this match City stayed in 21st after earning only their second point at home after a 0–0 draw against Luton Town.

===== December =====
After elimination from the FA Cup, the Grecians did not have a fixture for the first Saturday of December. City's first match was away at Cheltenham Town, which was won 3–1, seeing the Grecians rise to 17th in the league table. Exeter City won a home match in the league for the first time that season the following week against Mansfield Town, with Ollie Watkins scoring both goals. The Grecians drew 0–0 at Yeovil Town in their Boxing Day fixture. New Year's Eve saw Exeter City beat Newport County 4–1 at Rodney Parade. Ollie Watkins scored his first hat-trick in professional football, the first hat-trick any Exeter City player had scored in the league since 1993. This result meant City finished the year at 11th place in the league table.

===== January =====
City began the year with a 4–0 thrashing of Leyton Orient where Ryan Harley scored a brace shortly after returning from injury. This win extended their unbeaten run to seven matches, seeing the Grecians rise from 24th in the league to 11th in that time. City were without a match on Saturday 7 January due to their fixture against Wycombe Wanderers being postponed because of the Chairboys' involvement in the third round of the FA Cup. After the few fixtures that took place that day, City dropped to 12th in the league table. The Grecians bounced back up the table with a 3–0 win at Grimsby Town, with Ollie Watkins, David Wheeler and Reuben Reid scoring their 10th, 9th and 5th goals of the season respectively. City won 3–0 again the following week, this time at home to Colchester United. Reid, Wheeler and Liam McAlinden scored while Ollie Watkins gained a hat-trick of assists. After this result, the Grecians rose to 9th in the League Table, only one point off the play-offs. Exeter City climbed into 7th place in the league table, the final play-off spot, after a 1–0 win away at Portsmouth, whom were also promotion contenders. City again triumphed over a fellow play-off contender by beating Wycombe Wanderers 4–2, moving up to fourth place.

===== February =====
The Grecians carried their excellent form into February with a 4–0 thrashing of Crewe Alexandra with David Wheeler breaking the all-time Exeter City record for consecutive matches scored in after his brace, meaning he had scored seven matches in a row. Jordan Moore-Taylor and Lloyd James also scored in the match. City were then only four points behind third-placed Carlisle United. Exeter City also won seven consecutive matches in the league (within a single season) for the first time. Exeter's unbeaten run was ended by rivals Plymouth Argyle in a 3–0 drubbing at Home Park. This was the Grecians' heaviest defeat of the season so far and the club dropped to 5th in the league table. Exeter dropped further down the league table to 6th after losing a 2–0 lead at 90 minutes to draw 2–2 at Notts County. Jake Taylor was sent off in the 87th minute. City drew again in their next game at home against Stevenage, with Reuben Reid equalizing early in the second half. Yet another draw was to follow the next game at home against Blackpool, where City fought back after finding themselves 2–0 down after 39 minutes. This stretched their home unbeaten run to 8 matches. City ended their winless streak with a 2–1 victory over Crawley Town on Shrove Tuesday, their 11th away league victory of the season.

===== March =====
City had a very poor start to the month after losing 3–1 to relegation-threatened Hartlepool United. Much like the reverse fixture back in August, Exeter forfeited a 1–0 half-time lead. Subsequently, the Reds dropped to 7th. Exeter's promotion hopes were dealt another blow after a second consecutive loss to a bottom-half side, this time Accrington Stanley who beat City 2–0. Despite only gaining 6 points from 7 matches, City remained in the play-off qualification places. The Reds bounced back with a 3–0 win against Cheltenham Town on 14 March with Reuben Reid netting twice. Despite gaining a credible away draw the following weekend at Luton Town, Exeter's position in the play-off places was made even more precarious by wins for Blackpool and Mansfield Town. The Grecians pulled off an incredible comeback to draw 3–3 against Yeovil Town despite being 3–0 down after 87 minutes, with Wheeler, Brown and Reid rescuing the team from dropping out of the play-off places.

===== April =====
City pulled off another stunning comeback the following Saturday, this time at Mansfield Town after going 1–0 down before half-time. The Reds won 2–1 thanks to goal in the 84th minute from Ryan Harley and a 97th-minute spot-kick which was converted by Reuben Reid. There was to be no come-back the following week as Newport County successfully defended their 1–0 lead to move closer to League Two survival, while the Grecians remained in 6th as other results went their way. Exeter returned to winning ways with a victory against Barnet on Good Friday. Moore-Taylor and Wheeler both scored with the first six minutes and City held on their lead despite a second-half goal from John Akinde. City lost on Easter Monday at Cambridge thanks to a first-half goal from Leon Legge. At this point in the season with 3 matches remaining, there was a mere 6-point gap between 4th place and 13th place in the league table and City were precariously only 3 points above 13th despite sitting in 6th. Exeter increased their cushion over 8th place to 3 points with a 3–1 win over Morecambe at home. David Wheeler scored his 18th goal of the season in what was yet another thrilling late surge of goalscoring by the Grecians. City assured qualification to the playoffs on 29 April after a 3–1 away victory over then-leaders Doncaster Rovers with goals from Moore-Taylor, Wheeler and McAlinden. Former Grecian James Coppinger netted for Doncaster.

===== May =====
In a repeat of their reverse fixture back in November, City surrendered a 2–1 lead to lose 2–3 to Carlisle United. The Cumbrians netted two spot-kicks in this match, a result which earned them 6th-place in the league table and meant Exeter and Carlisle would face off in the League Two promotion play-offs.

In the first leg of the play-off semi-final against Carlisle, the teams played out a 3–3 draw. City opened the scoring in the 15th minute after Grant scored a header, but were pegged back a quarter of an hour later after an own goal by Moore-Taylor. Just before half-time, Harley scored to give City back the lead. Wheeler scored after 56 minutes to extend Exeter's lead to 3–1. Carlisle then scored two goals in two minutes to bring the score to 3–3. Joel Grant finished the match with a goal and two assists.

The second leg saw a very late winner for Exeter, scored by loanee Jack Stacey. City had gone 2–0 up with both goals scored by Ollie Watkins in the 10th and 79th minutes, but Carlisle scored twice in the final ten minutes of normal time to make it 2–2. Jack Stacey then scored his first goal for Exeter in the 95th minute to send the Grecians to Wembley.

Blackpool overcame Exeter in the play-off final, starting the game very well by scoring in the 2nd minute through Brad Potts. David Wheeler then equalised after 40 minutes and the first half finished 1–1. Mark Cullen scored the winning goal for Blackpool in the 64th minute.

==== League table ====
Pos	Team	Pld	W	D	L	GF	GA	GD	Pts	Promotion, qualification or relegation
3	Doncaster Rovers (P)	46	25	10	11	85	55	+30	85	Promotion to EFL League One
4	Luton Town	46	20	17	9	70	43	+27	77	Qualification for League Two play-offs (Note: Four teams play for one spot and promotion to EFL League One)
5	Exeter City	46	21	8	17	75	56	+19	71	Qualification for League Two play-offs
6	Carlisle United	46	18	17	11	69	68	+1	71	Qualification for League Two play-offs
7	Blackpool (O, P)	46	18	16	12	69	46	+23	70	Qualification for League Two play-offs

Updated to match(es) played on 6 May 2017. Source: BBC Sport
Rules for classification: 1) Points; 2) Goal difference; 3) Number of goals scored
(O) Play-off winners; (P) Promoted

==== Results summary ====
Note: does not include play-off matches.

Overall								Home						Away					
Pld	W	D	L	GF	GA	GD	Pts	W	D	L	GF	GA	GD	W	D	L	GF	GA	GD
46	21	8	17	75	56	+19	71	8	5	10	36	29	+7	13	3	7	39	27	+12

Last updated: 6 May 2017.
Source: BBC Sport

==== Results by round ====
Round	1	2	3	4	5	6	7	8	9	10	11	12	13	14	15	16	17	18	19	20	21	22	23	24	25	26	27	28	29	30	31	32	33	34	35	36	37	38	39	40	41	42	43	44	45	46
Ground	A	H	H	A	H	A	A	H	A	H	A	H	A	H	A	H	A	A	H	A	H	A	A	H	A	H	A	H	H	A	A	H	H	A	A	H	H	A	H	A	H	H	A	H	A	H
Result	L	L	L	W	L	W	L	L	W	L	L	D	W	L	W	L	L	W	D	W	W	D	W	W	W	W	W	W	W	L	D	D	D	W	L	L	W	D	D	W	L	W	L	W	W	L
Position	21	23	24	23	23	18	21	23	20	22	23	23	20	23	19	23	24	21	21	17	15	15	11	11	10	9	7	4	4	5	6	6	6	6	7	7	7	7	7	6	6	5	6	5	5	5

Updated to match(es) played on 6 May 2017. Source: BBC Match result pages
A = Away; H = Home; W = Win; D = Draw; L = Loss

==== Matches ====
On 22 June 2016, the fixtures for the 2016–17 season were announced.

===== August =====
6 August 2016 1	Blackpool	2–0	Exeter City	Blackpool
15:00 BST	Vassell 20'; Brown 52' (o.g.)	Report		Stadium: Bloomfield Road; Attendance: 3,754; Referee: John Brooks

13 August 2016 2	Exeter City	1–2	Hartlepool United	Exeter
15:00 BST	McAlinden 31'	Report	Woods 74'; Paynter 75'	Stadium: St James Park; Attendance: 3,322; Referee: Mark Heywood

16 August 2016 3	Exeter City	0–1	Crawley Town	Exeter
19:45 BST		Report	Yorwerth 83'	Stadium: St James Park; Attendance: 2,660; Referee: Lee Collins

20 August 2016 4	Accrington Stanley	1–2	Exeter City	Accrington
15:00 BST	Davies 70'	Report	Harley 66'; Taylor 72'	Stadium: Crown Ground; Attendance: 1,300 (111 away); Referee: Ross Joyce

27 August 2016 5	Exeter City	0–1	Portsmouth	Exeter
15:00 BST		Report	Roberts 85' (pen.)	Stadium: St James Park; Attendance: 4,512; Referee: Gavin Ward

===== September =====
3 September 2016 6	Colchester United	2–3	Exeter City	Colchester
15:00 BST	Szmodics 13'; Guthrie 38'	Report	Simpson 8'; Watkins 51'; Grant 67'	Stadium: Colchester Community Stadium; Attendance: 3,364 (255 away); Referee: Darren Deadman

10 September 2016 7	Crewe Alexandra	2–0	Exeter City	Crewe
15:00 BST	Kiwomya 23'; Hollands 87'	Report		Stadium: Gresty Road; Attendance: 3,896; Referee: Robert Jones

17 September 2016 8	Exeter City	0–2	Plymouth Argyle	Exeter
15:00 BST		Report	Carey 6'; Garita 26'	Stadium: St James Park; Attendance: 6,612; Referee: Dean Whitestone

24 September 2016 9	Stevenage	0–2	Exeter City	Stevenage
15:00 BST		Report	Holmes 70'; Watkins 71'	Stadium: Broadhall Way; Attendance: 2,244; Referee: Ollie Yates

27 September 2016 10	Exeter City	0–2	Notts County	Exeter
19:45 BST		Report	Stead 3', 34'	Stadium: St James Park; Attendance: 3,081; Referee: Kevin Johnson

===== October =====
1 October 2016 11	Wycombe Wanderers	1–0	Exeter City	High Wycombe
15:00 BST	Akinfenwa 85'	Report		Stadium: Adams Park; Attendance: 3,297; Referee: Nick Kinseley

8 October 2016 12	Exeter City	0–0	Grimsby Town	Exeter
15:00 BST		Report		Stadium: St James Park; Attendance: 3,557; Referee: John Brooks

15 October 2016 13	Barnet	1–4	Exeter City	Canons Park, London
15:00 BST	Akinde 11'	Report	Taylor 43'; Holmes 50'; Wheeler 56'; Reid 81' (pen.)	Stadium: The Hive; Attendance: 1,640 (360 away); Referee: Michael Salisbury

22 October 2016 14	Exeter City	1–2	Cambridge United	Exeter
15:00 BST	Grant 73'	Report	Berry 7'; Dunk 10'	Stadium: St James Park; Attendance: 3,485; Referee: Robert Jones

29 October 2016 15	Morecambe	0–3	Exeter City	Morecambe
15:00 BST		Report	Wheeler 4'; Grant 16'; Holmes 35'	Stadium: Globe Arena; Attendance: 1,302 (153 away); Referee: Ben Toner

===== November =====
12 November 2016 16	Exeter City	1–3	Doncaster Rovers	Exeter
15:00 GMT	Reid 51' (pen.)	Report	Mandeville 72'; Marquis 77', 90'	Stadium: St James Park; Attendance: 3,540; Referee: Charles Breakspear

19 November 2016 17	Carlisle United	3–2	Exeter City	Carlisle
15:00 GMT	Wyke 9', 90+7'; Miller 89'	Report	Reid 1'; Holmes 54'	Stadium: Brunton Park; Attendance: 5,058; Referee: Ross Joyce

22 November 2016 18	Leyton Orient	0–1	Exeter City	Leyton, London
19:45 GMT		Report	Watkins 26'	Stadium: Brisbane Road; Attendance: 2,926 (316 away); Referee: Tim Robinson

26 November 2016 19	Exeter City	0–0	Luton Town	Exeter
15:00 GMT		Report		Stadium: St James Park; Attendance: 3,823; Referee: Chris Kavanagh

===== December =====
10 December 2016 20	Cheltenham Town	1–3	Exeter City	Cheltenham
15:00 GMT	Waters 70'	Report	Holmes 55'; Wheeler 81', 85'	Stadium: Whaddon Road; Attendance: 3,113 (678 away); Referee: Darren England

17 December 2016 21	Exeter City	2–0	Mansfield Town	Exeter
15:00 GMT	Watkins 19', 90'	Report		Stadium: St James Park; Attendance: 3,626; Referee: Kevin Johnson

26 December 2016 22	Yeovil Town	0–0	Exeter City	Yeovil
15:00 GMT		Report		Stadium: Huish Park; Attendance: 6,086 (1,359 away); Referee: Tim Robinson

31 December 2016 23	Newport County	1–4	Exeter City	Newport, Wales
15:00 GMT	Rigg 81'	Report	Watkins 45+1', 47', 90+5'; Wheeler 53'	Stadium: Rodney Parade; Attendance: 2,663; Referee: Darren Deadman

===== January =====
2 January 2017 24	Exeter City	4–0	Leyton Orient	Exeter
15:00 GMT	Wheeler 4'; Harley 50', 65' (pen.); McAlinden 82'	Report		Stadium: St James Park; Attendance: 4,537; Referee: Michael Salisbury

7 January 2017 25	Exeter City	Postponed	Wycombe Wanderers
15:00 GMT

14 January 2017 26	Grimsby Town	0–3	Exeter City	Cleethorpes
15:00 GMT		Report	Reid 41'; Wheeler 59'; Watkins 80'	Stadium: Blundell Park; Attendance: 5,009 (245 away); Referee: Ben Toner

21 January 2017 27	Exeter City	3–0	Colchester United	Exeter
15:00 GMT	Reid 20'; Wheeler 77'; McAlinden 89'	Report		Stadium: St James Park; Attendance: 4,114; Referee: Robert Lewis

28 January 2017 28	Portsmouth	0–1	Exeter City	Portsmouth
15:00 GMT		Report	Wheeler 57'	Stadium: Fratton Park; Attendance: 17,195 (1,010 away); Referee: Dean Whitestone

31 January 2017 25	Exeter City	4–2	Wycombe Wanderers	Exeter
19:45 GMT	Wheeler 19'; Brown 65'; Grant 67'; Watkins 90+5'	Report	Thompson 38'; Jakubiak 89'	Stadium: St James Park; Attendance: 3,656; Referee: John Brooks

===== February =====
4 February 2017 29	Exeter City	4–0	Crewe Alexandra	Exeter
15:00 GMT	Moore-Taylor 8'; Wheeler 58', 68'; James 85'	Report		Stadium: St James Park; Attendance: 4,534; Referee: Gavin Ward

11 February 2017 30	Plymouth Argyle	3–0	Exeter City	Plymouth
15:00 GMT	Kennedy 14'; R. Taylor 45+1'; Jervis 90+3' (pen.)	Report		Stadium: Home Park; Attendance: 14,671 (1,533 away); Referee: Simon Hooper

14 February 2017 31	Notts County	2–2	Exeter City	Nottingham
19:45 GMT	Duffy 90+2'; Moore-Taylor 90+3' (o.g.)	Report	Wheeler 33'; Harley 88'	Stadium: Meadow Lane; Attendance: 4,047 (207 away); Referee: Seb Stockbridge

18 February 2017 32	Exeter City	1–1	Stevenage	Exeter
15:00 GMT	Reid 52'	Report	McAnuff 31'	Stadium: St James Park; Attendance: 4,124; Referee: Darren Handley

25 February 2017 33	Exeter City	2–2	Blackpool	Exeter
15:00 GMT	Watkins 45+5'; Reid 90+1'	Report	Daniel 18'; Potts 39'	Stadium: St James Park; Attendance: 4,125; Referee: Kevin Johnson

28 February 2017 34	Crawley Town	1–2	Exeter City	Crawley
19:45 GMT	Connolly 90+1'	Report	Watkins 50'; Moore-Taylor 68'	Stadium: Broadfield Stadium; Attendance: 1,826 (362 away); Referee: Dean Whitestone

===== March =====
4 March 2017 35	Hartlepool United	3–1	Exeter City	Hartlepool
15:00 GMT	Alessandra 66', 90+1'; Amond 69'	Report	Watkins 14'	Stadium: Victoria Park; Attendance: 3,775 (166 away); Referee: Robert Lewis

11 March 2017 36	Exeter City	0–2	Accrington Stanley	Exeter
15:00 GMT		Report	McCartan 11'; Pearson 71'	Stadium: St James Park; Attendance: 3,897; Referee: Charles Breakspear

14 March 2017 37	Exeter City	3–0	Cheltenham Town	Exeter
19:45 GMT	Reid 43' (pen.), 51'; Taylor 57'	Report		Stadium: St James Park; Attendance: 3,539; Referee: Brett Huxtable

18 March 2017 38	Luton Town	1–1	Exeter City	Luton
15:00 GMT	Hylton 68'	Report	Taylor 59'	Stadium: Kenilworth Road; Attendance: 7,657 (415 away); Referee: Trevor Kettle

25 March 2017 39	Exeter City	3–3	Yeovil Town	Exeter
15:00 GMT	Wheeler 89'; Brown 90+1'; Reid 90+2'	Report	Zoko 62'; Harrison 70'; Lacey 78'	Stadium: St James Park; Attendance: 5,492; Referee: Darren Dysdale

===== April =====
1 April 2017 40	Mansfield Town	1–2	Exeter City	Mansfield
15:00 BST	Benning 38'	Report	Harley 84'; Reid 90+7' (pen.)	Stadium: Field Mill; Attendance: 3,878 (379 away); Referee: Ben Toner

8 April 2017 41	Exeter City	0–1	Newport County	Exeter
15:00 BST		Report	Owen-Evans 53'	Stadium: St James Park; Attendance: 4,040; Referee: Eddie Ilderton

14 April 2017 42	Exeter City	2–1	Barnet	Exeter
15:00 BST	Moore-Taylor 4'; Wheeler 6'	Report	Akinde 69'	Stadium: St James Park; Attendance: 4,780; Referee: Sebastian Stockbridge

17 April 2017 43	Cambridge United	1–0	Exeter City	Cambridge
15:00 BST	Legge 29'	Report		Stadium: Abbey Stadium; Attendance: 6,130 (539 away); Referee: Darren Deadman

22 April 2017 44	Exeter City	3–1	Morecambe	Exeter
15:00 BST	Wheeler 47'; Reid 90+2' (pen.); McAlinden 90+5'	Report	Ellison 61'	Stadium: St James Park; Attendance: 3,991; Referee: Lee Swabey

29 April 2017 45	Doncaster Rovers	1–3	Exeter City	Doncaster
15:00 BST	Coppinger 26'	Report	Moore Taylor 16'; Wheeler 61'; McAlinden 86'	Stadium: Keepmoat Stadium; Attendance: 7,790 (667 away); Referee: Charles Breakspear

===== May =====
6 May 2017 46	Exeter City	2–3	Carlisle United	Exeter
17:30 BST	Reid 9'; Moore-Taylor 45+3'	Report	Grainger 30' (pen.), 72' (pen.); Proctor 75'	Stadium: St James Park; Attendance: 6,774; Referee: Steve Martin

===== Play-off semi-final =====
14 May 2017 First leg	Carlisle United	3–3	Exeter City	Carlisle
18:30 BST	Moore-Taylor 32' (o.g.); O'Sullivan 71'; Miller 73'	Report	Grant 15'; Harley 45+1'; Wheeler 56'	Stadium: Brunton Park; Attendance: 9,708 (571 away); Referee: David Webb

18 May 2017 Second leg	Exeter City	3–2 (6–5 agg.)	Carlisle United	Exeter
19:45 BST	Watkins 10', 79'; Stacey 90+4'	Report	O'Sullivan 90'; Kennedy 81'	Stadium: St James Park; Attendance: 7,450; Referee: Dean Whitestone

===== Play-off final =====
28 May 2017 Final	Blackpool	2–1	Exeter City	London
15:00 BST	Potts 2'; Cullen 64'	Report	Wheeler 40'	Stadium: Wembley Stadium; Attendance: 23,380; Referee: Darren England

=== FA Cup ===
The Grecians were beaten 3–1 at home in the FA Cup first round by Luton Town after conceding two penalties The first penalty was conceded after 11 minutes and was converted by Danny Hylton. Reuben Reid then equalized in the 39th minute. Luton regained the lead after 71 minutes when Glen Rea scored. Despite Town going down to 10 men soon after, they finished off the game after Hylton scored his second goal from the spot after 86 minutes. This penalty was given after a shove by Troy Archibald-Henville, in his first appearance for the Grecians after a long injury lay-off.

5 November 2016 First round	Exeter City	1–3	Luton Town	Exeter
15:00 GMT	R. Reid 39'	Report	Hylton 11' (pen.), 86' (pen.); Rea 71'	Stadium: St James Park; Attendance: 2,972; Referee: John Busby

=== EFL Cup ===
Exeter City won their match against Brentford in the first round after Ryan Harley scored in the 100th minute. Ethan Ampadu became the youngest ever player to be fielded by the club in this match, aged just 15 years, 10 months and 26 days. In the second round of the EFL Cup, City lost 3–1 to Premier League side Hull City. Jake Taylor had opened the scoring after 24 minutes but Adama Diomande equalized after two minutes and scored again in the second half. Robert Snodgrass scored straight from a free kick to ensure Exeter's elimination from the competition.

9 August 2016 First round	Exeter City	1–0	Brentford	Exeter
19:45 BST	Harley 100'	Report		Stadium: St James Park; Attendance: 2,633; Referee: Kevin Johnson

23 August 2016 Second round	Exeter City	1–3	Hull City	Exeter
19:45 BST	Taylor 24'	Report	Diomande 26', 77'; Snodgrass 81'	Stadium: St James Park; Attendance: 4,037; Referee: Andy Woolmer

=== EFL Trophy ===
Exeter City began their EFL Trophy campaign with a loss to League One side Oxford United. The Grecians were 2–0 down after 36 minutes but Matt Jay scored his first goal for the club just before half-time and Liam McAlinden equalized after 61 minutes. However, United scored twice in three minutes to condemn City to an opening defeat.

The Grecians won their next match against the Chelsea F.C. Reserves and Academy. Ollie Watkins opened the scoring after only 2 minutes before David Wheeler scored in the 25th minute to give City a 2–0 lead at half-time. Liam McAlinden made it 3–0 shortly after the break. Ike Ugbo scored twice in the second half but Exeter held on to their lead.

City were then knocked out of the League Trophy after a loss on penalties to Swindon Town after Wheeler cancelled out a Luke Norris opener. Striker Robbie Simpson played as a centre-back for the first half of this match due to club's ongoing injury crisis. Swindon won the shoot-out 4–2 after Lloyd James and Lee Holmes missed from the spot.

Pos	Div	Team	Pld	W	PW	PL	L	GF	GA	GD	Pts	Qualification
1	L1	Swindon Town	3	1	2	0	0	3	2	+1	7	Advance to Round 2
2	L1	Oxford United	3	1	0	2	0	5	3	+2	5	Advance to Round 2
3	L2	Exeter City	3	1	0	1	1	6	7	−1	4	
4	ACA	Chelsea U21	3	0	1	0	2	4	6	−2	2	

Source: Sky Sports

30 August First round match 1	Oxford United	4–2	Exeter City	Oxford
19:45 BST	Roberts 12'; Maguire 36' (pen.); Taylor 68'; MacDonald 71'		Jay 43'; McAlinden 61'	Stadium: Kassam Stadium

18 October First round match 2	Exeter City	3–2	Chelsea Reserves and Academy	Exeter
19:45	Watkins 2'; Wheeler 25'; McAlinden 49'		Ugbo 70', 90+4'	Stadium: St James Park; Attendance: 1,979

8 November First round match 3	Exeter City	1–1 (2–4 p)	Swindon Town	Exeter
19:45	Wheeler 60'		Norris 30'	Stadium: St James Park; Attendance: 729
	Penalties
	James (penalty missed); Simpson (penalty scored); Grant (penalty scored); Holmes (penalty missed)		Doughty (penalty scored); Evans (penalty scored); Branco (penalty scored); Kasim (penalty scored)

== Squad statistics ==
Numbers in parentheses denote appearances as substitute.
Players with squad numbers struck through and marked † left the club during the playing season.
Players with names in italics and marked * were on loan from another club for the whole of their season with Exeter.
Players listed with no appearances have been in the matchday squad but only as unused substitutes.
Key to positions: GK – Goalkeeper; DF – Defender; MF – Midfielder; FW – Forward

No.	Pos.	Nat.	Name	Apps	Goals	Apps	Goals	Apps	Goals	Apps	Goals	Apps	Goals	Apps	Goals	Yellow card	Red card
No.	Pos.	Nat.	Name	League		FA Cup		EFL Cup		EFL Trophy		Play-offs		Total		Discipline	
1	GK	AUT	Bobby Olejnik	17 (1)	0	1	0	1	0	1	0	2	0	22 (1)	0	1	0
2	DF	ENG	Tom McCready	1 (1)	0	0	0	1	0	1	0	0	0	2 (1)	0	0	0
3	DF	ENG	Craig Woodman	33	0	1	0	1	0	1	0	3	0	39	0	5	0
4	MF	WAL	Lloyd James	42 (1)	1	0	0	2	0	2	0	2	0	48 (1)	1	9	0
5	DF	ENG	Troy Archibald-Henville	1 (2)	0	0 (1)	0	0	0	0	0	0	0	1 (3)	0	1	0
6	MF	ENG	Jordan Tillson	9 (11)	0	0	0	1	0	0	0	1	0	11 (11)	0	1	0
7	MF	ENG	Ryan Harley	28 (3)	5	0	0	2	1	0	0	3	1	33 (3)	7	4	0
8	FW	ENG	Robbie Simpson	14 (12)	1	1	0	1	0	1	0	0	0	17 (12)	1	5	0
10	MF	ENG	Lee Holmes	12 (4)	5	1	0	0	0	0 (1)	0	1 (2)	0	14 (7)	5	1	0
11	MF	ENG	David Wheeler	33 (5)	17	1	0	0 (2)	0	2	2	3	2	39 (7)	21	3	0
12	MF	JAM	Joel Grant	9 (11)	4	0 (1)	0	1	0	3	0	2 (1)	1	15 (13)	5	0	0
14	FW	ENG	Ollie Watkins	40 (5)	13	0	0	1 (1)	0	2	1	3	2	46 (6)	16	5	0
15	DF	ENG	Jordan Moore-Taylor	42	5	1	0	1	0	1	0	3	0	48	5	3	1
16	MF	ENG	Matt Oakley	5 (14)	0	0 (1)	0	0	0	3	0	0	0	8 (15)	0	3	0
17	MF	ENG	Paul Tisdale	0	0	0	0	0	0	0	0	0	0	0	0	0	0
19	FW	IRL	Liam McAlinden	9 (23)	5	0	0	1 (1)	0	3	2	0	0	13 (24)	7	2	0
20	MF	ENG	Matt Jay	0 (2)	0	0	0	0	0	1 (2)	1	0	0	1 (4)	1	0	0
21	GK	GUE	James Hamon	1	0	0	0	0	0	1	0	0	0	2	0	0	0
~~22~~ †	DF	ENG	Danny Butterfield	0	0	0	0	0	0	0	0	0	0	0	0	0	0
23	DF	ENG	Connor Riley-Lowe	4 (1)	0	0	0	1 (1)	0	1 (1)	0	0	0	6 (3)	0	1	0
24	MF	ENG	Alex Byrne	0 (1)	0	0	0	0	0	1	0	0	0	1 (1)	0	0	0
25	MF	WAL	Jake Taylor	43	4	1	0	2	1	0 (2)	0	3	0	49 (2)	5	10	1
26	DF	WAL	Ethan Ampadu	6 (2)	0	1	0	2	0	1 (1)	0	0	0	10 (3)	0	2	0
27	FW	ENG	Archie Collins	0	0	0	0	0	0	0	0	0	0	0	0	0	0
28	DF	ENG	Jack Stacey *	27 (7)	0	1	0	0	0	0	0	2 (1)	1	30 (8)	1	2	0
29	DF	ENG	Luke Croll *	16 (3)	0	0	0	0	0	1	0	0	0	17 (3)	0	2	0
30	GK	ENG	Christy Pym	28	0	0	0	1	0	1	0	1	0	31	0	2	0
31	DF	IRL	Pierce Sweeney	27 (2)	0	1	0	2	0	3	0	1 (1)	0	34 (3)	0	6	0
33	FW	ENG	Reuben Reid	31 (5)	13	1	1	0	0	2	0	0 (2)	0	34 (7)	14	5	0
36	DF	ENG	Kyle Egan	0 (1)	0	0	0	0	0	1	0	0	0	1 (1)	0	0	0
37	DF	ENG	Toby Down	0	0	0	0	0	0	0 (1)	0	0	0	0 (1)	0	0	0
38	DF	ENG	Jordan Storey	0	0	0	0	0	0	0 (1)	0	0	0	0 (1)	0	0	0
39	DF	WAL	Troy Brown	28 (2)	2	0	0	1	0	0	0	3	0	32 (2)	2	6	0
40	MF	WAL	Max Smallcombe	0	0	0	0	0	0	1	0	0	0	1	0	0	0

Players not included in matchday squads
No.	Pos.	Nat.	Name
18	FW	NIR	Jamie Reid
22	FW	IRL	Ryan Swan
34	MF	ENG	Joe Charles
35	DF	ENG	Nick Grimes
