= 2014–15 Exeter City F.C. season =

Exeter City F.C.
2014-15 season
- Chairman: Edward Chorlton OBE
- Manager: Paul Tisdale
- Stadium: St James Park
- League Two: 10th
- FA Cup: First round
- League Cup: First round (knocked out by Bournemouth)
- FL Trophy: Second round
- Top goalscorer: Tom Nichols (15)
Home colours	Away colours

This page shows the progress of Exeter City F.C. in the 2014–15 football season. They are playing in the fourth tier of English football, League Two.

== Match details ==
=== Pre-season ===
15 July 2014	Exeter City	0–1	Reading	Exeter
19:30 BST		Report	Edwards 8'	Stadium: St James Park; Attendance: 1,211 (202 away); Referee: Andy Woolmer

20 July 2014	Fluminense U23s	0–0	Exeter City	Rio de Janeiro
14:30 BST -4 hours		Report		Stadium: Estádio das Laranjeiras; Attendance: c. 600 (c. 170 away)

23 July 2014	Tupi	1–2	Exeter City	Juiz de Fora
23:30 BST -4 hours	Maranhão 60'	Report	Keohane 83'; Coles 90'	Stadium: Universidade Federal de Juiz de Fora

25 July 2014	Rio Cricket e Associação Atlética	1–3	Exeter City	Rio de Janeiro
15:30 BST -4 hours	Unknown 34'	Report	Keohane 49'; Jay 65'; Watkins 70'	Stadium: R. Fagundes Varela, 637 - Ingá

29 July 2014	Exeter City	0–2	(Wales) Swansea City	Exeter
19:15 BST		Report	Gomis 31'; Sheehan 79'	Stadium: St James Park; Attendance: 2,274 (375 away); Referee: Oli Langford

2 August 2014	Exeter City	0–2	Torquay United	Exeter
15:00 BST		Report	Bowman 61'; Chapell 83'	Stadium: St James Park; Attendance: 1,346 (186 away); Referee: Steve Bratt

=== League Two ===
==== League table ====
Pos	Team	Pld	W	D	L	GF	GA	GD	Pts
8	Luton Town	46	19	11	16	54	44	+10	68
9	Newport County	46	18	11	17	51	54	−3	65
10	Exeter City	46	17	13	16	61	65	−4	64
11	Morecambe	46	17	12	17	53	52	+1	63
12	Northampton Town	46	18	7	21	67	62	+5	61

Updated to match(es) played on 23 May 2015. Source: BBC Sport
Rules for classification: 1) Points; 2) Goal difference; 3) Number of goals scored

==== Matches ====
The fixtures for the 2014–15 season were announced on 18 June 2014 at 9am.

9 August 2014 1	Exeter City	1–1	Portsmouth	Exeter
15:00	Nichols 27'	Report	Wallace 74'	Stadium: St James Park; Attendance: 5,694; Referee: Andy Woolmer

16 August 2014 2	Plymouth Argyle	3–0	Exeter City	Plymouth
15:00	Harvey 14'; Reid 36'; Nelson 83'	Report		Stadium: Home Park; Attendance: 11,418 (943 away); Referee: Roger East

19 August 2014 3	Burton Albion	1–0	Exeter City	Burton-upon-Trent
19:45	Beavon 41'	Report		Stadium: Pirelli Stadium; Attendance: 2,099; Referee: Mark Heywood

23 August 2014 4	Exeter City	1–1	York City	Exeter
15:00	Wheeler 8'	Report	Lowe 82'	Stadium: St James Park; Attendance: 2,741 (141 away); Referee: Stephen Martin

30 August 2014 5	Northampton Town	1–0	Exeter City	Northampton
15:00	Richards 89'	Report		Stadium: Sixfields Stadium; Attendance: 4,053; Referee: Michael Bull

6 September 2014 6	Exeter City	1–2	Mansfield Town	Exeter
15:00	Grimes 67'	Report	Bingham 14'; Bell 40'	Stadium: St James Park; Attendance: 2,771; Referee: Tim Robinson

13 September 2014 7	Exeter City	1–1	Oxford United	Exeter
15:00	Cummins 4' (pen.)	Report	O'Dowda 15'	Stadium: St James Park; Attendance: 3,076 (434 away); Referee: James Linington

16 September 2014 8	Cambridge United	1–2	Exeter City	Cambridge
19:45	Bird 8'	Report	Cummins 17'; Nicholls 63'	Stadium: Abbey Stadium; Attendance: 3,266 (155 away); Referee: Chris Kavanagh

20 September 2014 9	Tranmere Rovers	1–2	Exeter City	Tranmere
15:00	Holmes 25'	Report	Cummins 6'; Moore-Taylor 69'	Stadium: Prenton Park; Attendance: 4,725; Referee: Mick Russell

27 September 2014 10	Exeter City	2–1	Bury	Exeter
15:00	Grimes 5'; Keohane 83'	Report	Soares 59'	Stadium: St James Park; Attendance: 3;215 (254 away); Referee: Stuart Attwell

3 October 2014 11	Dagenham & Redbridge	1–2	Exeter City	Dagenham
19:45	Cureton 11'; Ogogo (yellow card) 39'; Hemmings (yellow card) 45+2'; Boucaud (yellow card) 51'; Connors (yellow card) 74'; Batt (yellow card) 85'; Saah (yellow card) 90+6'	Report	Butterfield (yellow card) 18'; Bennett (yellow card) 30'; Keohane 81'; Davies 90+4'	Stadium: Victoria Road; Attendance: 2,138; Referee: Keith Stroud

11 October 2014 12	Exeter City	1–2	Hartlepool United	Exeter
15:00	Ribeiro 81'	Report	Woods 49'; Wyke 66'	Stadium: St James Park; Attendance: 3,547 (93 away); Referee: Darren Sheldrake

18 October 2014 13	Southend United	1–1	Exeter City	Southend-on-Sea
15:00	Worrall 33'; Williams (yellow card) 90+1'	Report	Wheeler (yellow card) 62'; Cummins 77'	Stadium: Roots Hall; Attendance: 5,749; Referee: Phil Gibbs

21 October 2014 14	Exeter City	2–1	Wycombe Wanderers	St James Park
19:45	Wheeler 26'; Bennett 60'	Report	Murphy 7'; Pierre (yellow card) 44'; Cowan-Hall (yellow card) 58'; Scowen (yellow card) 76'	Attendance: 3,129; Referee: Charles Breakspear

26 October 2014 15	Morecambe	0–2	Exeter City	Morecambe
13:00		Report	Beeley 9' (o.g.); Nichols 89'	Stadium: Globe Arena; Attendance: 1,787; Referee: Geoff Eltringham

1 November 2014 16	Exeter City	1–1	Luton Town	Exeter
15:00	Nichols 72' (pen.); Butterfield (yellow card) 83'	Report	Griffiths 3'; Doyle (yellow card) 85'	Stadium: St James Park; Attendance: 5,400; Referee: Dean Whitestone

16 November 2014 17	Newport County	2–2	Exeter City	Newport
15:00	Klukowski 49'; Porter 51'	BBC Report	Nichols 22'; Cummins 40'; Oakley (yellow card) 70'	Stadium: Rodney Parade; Attendance: 4,070; Referee: Scott Mathieson

22 November 2014 18	Exeter City	3–2	Shrewsbury Town	St James Park
15:00	Nichols 46', 90+1'; Grimes (yellow card) 61'; Wheeler 75' (yellow card) 90+6'; Cummins (yellow card) 77'	Report	Collins 13', 34'; Lawrence (yellow card) 29'; Knight-Percival (yellow card) 70'; Goldson (yellow card) 82'	Attendance: 3,933; Referee: Chris Sarginson

28 November 2014 19	Accrington Stanley	2–3	Exeter City	Accrington
19:45	O'Sullivan 65'; McCartan 73'	Report	Grimes (yellow card) 13' (goal) 69'; Sercombe 45+3'; Nichols 49'	Stadium: Crown Ground; Attendance: 1,443; Referee: Andy Haines

6 December 2014 20	Exeter City	1–1	Burton Albion	Exeter
15:00	Ribeiro 87'	Report	Blyth 60'; McCrory (yellow card) 90+3'	Stadium: St James Park; Attendance: 3,381; Referee: Pat Miller

13 December 2014 21	Exeter City	2–0	Carlisle United	Exeter
15:00	Bennett 58'; Grimes 89'	Report		Stadium: St James Park; Attendance: 3,402; Referee: Oliver Langford

20 December 2014 22	Stevenage	1–0	Exeter City	Stevenage
15:00	Lee 84'	Report	Ribeiro (yellow card) 45'; Morrison (yellow card) 90+5'	Stadium: Broadhall Way; Attendance: 2,878; Referee: Dean Whitestone

26 December 2014 23	Exeter City	1–0	Cheltenham Town	Exeter
15:00	Nichols 62'	Report	Braham-Barrett (yellow card) 44'	Stadium: St James Park; Attendance: 4,591; Referee: Brendan Malone

28 December 2014 24	AFC Wimbledon	4–1	Exeter City	Kingston upon Thames
15:00	Tubbs 9'; Fuller (yellow card) 18'; Ribeiro 48' (o.g.); Azeez 71'; Akinfenwa 86'	Report	Sercombe 90+3'	Stadium: Kingsmeadow; Attendance: 4,417; Referee: Tim Robinson

3 January 2015 25	Exeter City	1–2	Accrington Stanley	Exeter
15:00	Nichols 35'	Report	Aldred (yellow card) 37' (goal) 90+2'; Hunt (yellow card) 45'; McCartan 67'; Joyce (yellow card) 76'; Molyneux (yellow card) 78'	Stadium: St James Park; Attendance: 3,626; Referee: Trevor Kettle

10 January 2015 26	Exeter City	0–2	Northampton Town	Exeter
15:00	Noble (yellow card) 31'; Sercombe (yellow card) 80'	Report	Richards 20'; O'Toole 29' (yellow card) 69'; Cresswell (yellow card) 44'	Stadium: St James Park; Attendance: 3,519; Referee: Kevin Johnson

17 January 2015 27	Mansfield Town	2–3	Exeter City	Mansfield
15:00	Ravenhill (yellow card) 14'; Oliver (yellow card) 32' (goal) 68'; Kee 57'	Report	Nichols (yellow card) 19' (goal) 37'; Bennett 77'; Nicholls 83' (pen.)	Stadium: Field Mill; Attendance: 3,881; Referee: Nick Kinseley

24 January 2015 28	Oxford United	2–2	Exeter City	Oxford
15:00	Hylton 18'; Roberts 90+2'	Report	Davies 37'; Noble (yellow card) 44'; Nicholls 88'	Stadium: Kassam Stadium; Attendance: 6,791; Referee: Graham Horwood

31 January 2015 29	Exeter City	1–2	Tranmere Rovers	Exeter
15:00	Nicholls 37'; Sercombe (yellow card) 86'	Report	Thompson (yellow card) 9'; Myrie-Williams 29'; Donnelly 50' (yellow card) 79'	Stadium: St James Park; Attendance: 4,044; Referee: Lee Collins

7 February 2015 30	Bury	1–1	Exeter City	Bury
15:00	Cameron (yellow card) 13'; Nardiello 45'	Report	Reid 57' (pen.) 13'; McAllister (yellow card) 57'; Oakley (yellow card) 65'	Stadium: Gigg Lane; Attendance: 3,513; Referee: Nigel Miller

10 February 2015 31	Exeter City	2–2	Cambridge United	Exeter
19:45	Nichols 65'; Wheeler 88'	Report	Coulson (yellow card) 30'; Simpson 37'; Woodman 50' (o.g.); Nelson (yellow card) 77'	Stadium: St James Park; Attendance: 3,012; Referee: Mick Russell

14 February 2015 32	Portsmouth	1–0	Exeter City	Portsmouth
15:00	Wallace (yellow card) 59' (goal) 90+1'; Atangana (yellow card) 90+4'	Report	Harley (yellow card) 36'; Ribeiro (yellow card) 72'; Butterfield (yellow card) 73'	Stadium: Fratton Park; Attendance: 14,097; Referee: Pat Miller

21 February 2015 33	Exeter City	1–3	Plymouth Argyle	Exeter
15:00 GMT	Morrison (yellow card) 45'; Davies 45'; McAllister (yellow card) 63'		Hartley (yellow card) 64'; O'Connor (yellow card) 64'; Lee (red card) 61'; R Reid 27' pen' (57) 71'	Stadium: St James Park; Attendance: 7,440; Referee: Graham Scott

28 February 2015 34	York City	0–0	Exeter City	York
15:00		Report		Stadium: Bootham Crescent; Attendance: 3,209; Referee: Seb Stockbridge

7 March 2015 35	Carlisle United	1–3	Exeter City	Carlisle
15:00	Rigg 39'	Report	Harley 30', 56'; Sercombe 90+2'	Stadium: Brunton Park; Attendance: 3,724; Referee: Tony Harrington

14 March 2015 36	Exeter City	3–2	AFC Wimbledon	Exeter
15:00 GMT	Riley-Lowe (yellow card) 25'; Nichols 54', 66' (pen.); Wheeler 70'	Report	Akinfenwa 4'; Bulman (red card) 25'; Oshilaja (yellow card) 80'; Hamon 89' (o.g.)	Stadium: St James Park; Attendance: 3,713; Referee: Darren Deadman

17 March 2015 37	Exeter City	0–0	Stevenage	Exeter
		Report		Stadium: St James Park; Attendance: 3,149

21 March 2015 38	Cheltenham Town	1–2	Exeter City	Cheltenham
15:00	Sparrow (yellow card) 27'; Braham-Barrett (yellow card) 32'; Burns (yellow card) 36'; Jordan Moore-Taylor 89' (o.g.)	Report	Nichols 26'; Cummins 86'	Stadium: Whaddon Road; Attendance: 2,880; Referee: Darren Drysdale

28 March 2015 39	Exeter City	1–1	Morecambe	Exeter
15:00	Nicholls 80'; Nichols (red card) 90+5'	Report	McGowan 17'; Kenyon (yellow card) 18'; Wilson (yellow card) 75'; Hughes (yellow card) 89'	Stadium: St James Park; Attendance: 3,538; Referee: Michael Bull

3 April 2015 40	Luton Town	2–3	Exeter City	Luton
15:00 BST	Guttridge 21'; Cullen 45'	Report	Harley 61'; Moore-Taylor 76'; Wheeler 90+5'	Stadium: Kenilworth Road; Attendance: 8,755; Referee: Robert Lewis

6 April 2015 41	Exeter City	2–0	Newport County	Exeter
13:00 BST (UTC+1)	Wheeler 77'; Harley 90+1' (pen.)	Report		Stadium: St James Park; Attendance: 4,478; Referee: Gavin Ward

11 April 2015 42	Shrewsbury Town	4−0	Exeter City	Shrewsbury
15:00 GMT	Akpa Akpro 18', 73'; Collins 62'; Barnett 90'	Report		Stadium: New Meadow; Attendance: 5,442; Referee: Charles Breakspear

14 April 2015 43	Wycombe Wanderers	2–1	Exeter City	High Wycombe
19:45 BST	Saunders 7'; Hayes 90+12' (pen.)	Report	Sercombe 76'	Stadium: Adams Park; Attendance: 3,245; Referee: Iain Williamson

18 April 2015 44	Exeter City	0–1	Southend United	Exeter
15:00		Report	Barrett (yellow card) 27'; Timlin 90+2'	Stadium: St James Park; Attendance: 4,039; Referee: Darren Handley

25 April 2015 45	Hartlepool United	2–1	Exeter City	Hartlepool
15:00	Hugill (yellow card) 7'; Fenwick 15'; Hugill 44'	Report	Cummins 17'; Oakley (yellow card) 40'; Buxton (yellow card) 59'	Stadium: Victoria Park; Attendance: 4,994; Referee: Carl Boyeson

2 May 2015 46	Exeter City	2–1	Dagenham & Redbridge	Exeter
15:00	Keohane 61'; Nichols 70'	Report	Cureton 90'	Stadium: St James Park; Attendance: 3,645; Referee: Brendan Malone

=== FA Cup ===
The draw for the first round of the FA Cup was made on 27 October 2014.

7 November 2014 First round	Warrington Town	1–0	Exeter City	Warrington
19:55	Robinson 7'	Report		Stadium: Cantilever Park; Attendance: 2,400; Referee: David Coote

=== League Cup ===
The draw for the first round was made on 17 June 2014 at 10am. Exeter City were drawn at home to Bournemouth.

12 August 2014 Round One	Exeter City	0–2	Bournemouth	Exeter
19:45		Report	Bennett 55' (o.g.); Gosling 73'	Stadium: St James Park; Attendance: 2,648; Referee: Andy Davies

=== Football League Trophy ===
7 October 2014 Round Two	Coventry City	3–1	Exeter City	Coventry
19:45	Phillips (yellow card) 25' (goal) 35', 45+1'; McQuoid 59'	Report	Watkins 86'	Stadium: Ricoh Arena; Attendance: 7,273 (486 away); Referee: Andrew Madley

== Transfers ==
Players transferred in
Date	Pos.	Name	Previous club	Fee	Ref.
15 August 2014	FW	(Republic of Ireland) Graham Cummins	(England) Preston North End	Free	
22 August 2014	DF	(Wales) Christian Ribeiro	(England) Scunthorpe United	Free	
27 November 2014	FW	(Republic of Ireland) Clinton Morrison	(England) Long Eaton United	Free	
12 January 2015	MF	(England) Ryan Harley	(England) Swindon Town	Free	
16 January 2015	DF	(Scotland) Jamie McAllister	(India) Kerala Blasters	Free	
2 February 2015	MF	(England) Tom McCready	(England) Morecambe	Free	
Players transferred out
Date	Pos.	Name	To	Fee	Ref.
8 May 2014	MF	(England) Jacob Cane	(England) Weston-super-Mare	Free	
8 May 2014	FW	(Wales) Elliott Chamberlain	(England) Gloucester City	Free	
8 May 2014	FW	(Scotland) Alan Gow	(Scotland) St Mirren	Free	
8 May 2014	FW	(Republic of Ireland) John O'Flynn	(Republic of Ireland) Cork City	Free	
8 May 2014	FW	(Scotland) Sam Parkin	Released	Free	
8 May 2014	DF	(England) Jacob Wannell	Released	Free	
17 May 2014	MF	(England) Jake Gosling	(England) Bristol Rovers	Free	
30 June 2014	GK	(Poland) Artur Krysiak	(England) Yeovil Town	Free	
6 August 2014	DF	(England) Danny Coles	(England) Forest Green Rovers	Free	
2 January 2015	MF	(England) Matt Grimes	(Wales) Swansea City	£1,750,000	
22 January 2015	MF	(England) Aaron Dawson	(England) Torquay United	Free	
Players loaned in
Date from	Pos.	Name	From	Date to	Ref.
1 September 2014	FW	(England) Alex Nicholls	(England) Northampton Town	4 October 2014	
12 September 2014	MF	(Scotland) David Noble	(England) Oldham Athletic	10 October 2014	
20 November 2014	MF	(England) Ryan Harley	(England) Swindon Town	1 January 2015	
27 November 2014	FW	(England) Alex Nicholls	(England) Northampton Town	7 January 2015	
16 March 2015	MF	(England) Lee Holmes	(England) Preston North End	30 June 2015	
Players loaned out
Date from	Pos.	Name	To	Date to	Ref.
