= Connor Riley-Lowe =

English footballer (born 1996)

Personal information
- Date of birth: 10 January 1996 (age 30)
- Place of birth: Paignton, England
- Position: Left back

Team information
- Current team: Truro City
- Number: 3

Youth career
- 2007–2014: Exeter City

Senior career*
Years	Team	Apps	(Gls)
2014–2017	Exeter City	8	(0)
2015	→ Weymouth (loan)	7	(0)
2015–2016	→ Truro City (loan)	34	(2)
2017	→ Truro City (loan)	5	(0)
2017–2019	Truro City	81	(9)
2019–2020	Bath City	29	(0)
2020–	Truro City	171	(11)
- * Club domestic league appearances and goals as of 21:24, 26 April 2025 (UTC)

Connor Riley-Lowe (born 10 January 1996) is an English professional footballer who plays for Truro City as a left back or left wing back.

== Club career ==
=== Exeter City ===
Riley-Lowe joined Exeter City's youth setup in 2007, aged 11. He then progressed through the academy team, being captain in numerous occasions.

Riley-Lowe signed a professional deal with the Grecians on 14 April 2014. He made his first-team debut on 12 August, replacing Craig Woodman in a 0–2 Football League Cup home loss against Bournemouth.

He left the club after the end of the 2016–17 season due to a need to play first-team football. Craig Woodman and Luke Croll were favoured over Riley-Lowe for the left-back position that season by manager Paul Tisdale.

=== Truro City ===
On 21 July 2015, Riley-Lowe joined National League South side Truro City on a six-month loan deal. On 8 August he made his debut for Truro in a 1–1 draw against Margate. He scored his first goal in a 2–0 win over St Albans City on 12 September.

Following his release by Exeter City, Riley-Lowe joined Truro City on a permanent basis on 4 August 2017.

=== Bath City ===
On 21 June 2019, Riley-Lowe joined Bath City. Riley-Lowe made 30 appearances for Bath before departing the following summer.

=== Return to Truro City ===
Riley-Lowe spent a solitary season with Bath before returning to former club Truro City in 2020. He went on to win the clubs' player of the season award in consecutive seasons in the seventh tier in 2021/22 & 2022/23, the latter season saw him score the winner in injury time the 2022–23 Southern Football League play-off final against Bracknell Town. Riley-Lowe made 43 appearances and captained the Cornish side on their return to Truro in a 2024/25 campaign which saw them crowned National League South winners.

== Career statistics ==
As of match played 26 April 2025

Appearances and goals by club, season and competition
Club	Season	League			FA Cup		League Cup		Other		Total	
Club	Season	Division	Apps	Goals	Apps	Goals	Apps	Goals	Apps	Goals	Apps	Goals
Exeter City	2014–15	League Two	3	0	0	0	1	0	1 (Note: Appearance in Football League Trophy)	0	5	0
Exeter City	2015–16	League Two	0	0	0	0	0	0	0	0	0	0
Exeter City	2016–17	League Two	5	0	0	0	2	0	2 (Note: Appearances in EFL Trophy)	0	9	0
Exeter City	Total		8	0	0	0	3	0	3	0	14	0
Weymouth (loan)	2014–15	Southern League; Premier Division	7	0	0	0	—		0	0	7	0
Truro City (loan)	2015–16	National League South	34	2	3	0	—		6 (Note: Five appearances in FA Trophy, one appearance in National League South play-offs)	0	43	2
Truro City (loan)	2016–17	National League South	5	0	0	0	—		0	0	5	0
Truro City	2017–18	National League South	40	6	4	0	—		2 (Note: One appearance in FA Trophy, one appearance in National League South play-offs)	0	46	6
Truro City	2018–19	National League South	41	3	2	0	—		3 (Note: Appearances in FA Trophy)	2	46	5
Truro City	Total		81	9	6	0	—		5	2	92	11
Bath City	2019–20	National League South	29	0	2	0	—		7 (Note: Five appearances in FA Trophy, one appearance in Somerset Premier Cup, one appearance in National League South play-offs)	0	38	0
Truro City	2020–21	Southern League; Premier Division South	8	1	3	0	—		3	0	14	1
Truro City	2021–22	Southern League; Premier Division South	38	1	2	0	–		4	0	44	1
Truro City	2022–23	Southern League; Premier Division South	42	3	1	0	–		3 (Note: Two appearances and one goal in Southern League Premier Division South play-offs, one appearances in FA Trophy)	1	46	4
Truro City	2023–24	National League South	40	1	1	0	–		1	0	42	1
Truro City	2024–25	National League South	43	5	0	0	–		1	0	44	5
Truro City	Total		171	11	7	0	0	0	12	1	190	12
Career total			335	22	18	0	3	0	33	3	389	25
