= David Wheeler (footballer) =

English footballer (born 1990)

Personal information
- Full name: David John Wheeler
- Date of birth: 4 October 1990 (age 36)
- Place of birth: Brighton, England
- Height: 5 ft 11 in (1.80 m)
- Position: Right winger

Youth career
- 2000–2006: Brighton & Hove Albion
- 2006–2007: Lewes

Senior career*
Years	Team	Apps	(Gls)
2007–2011	Lewes	88	(13)
2011–2013	Staines Town	70	(23)
2013–2017	Exeter City	151	(33)
2017–2019	Queens Park Rangers	9	(1)
2018–2019	→ Portsmouth (loan)	11	(0)
2019	→ Milton Keynes Dons (loan)	19	(4)
2019–2025	Wycombe Wanderers	173	(18)
2025	Shrewsbury Town	10	(0)
Total		531	(92)
- * Club domestic league appearances and goals as of 10:45, 16 April 2025 (UTC)

David John Wheeler (born 4 October 1990) is an English former professional footballer who played for English Football League clubs Exeter City, Queens Park Rangers, Portsmouth, Milton Keynes Dons, Wycombe Wanderers and Shrewsbury Town.

== Club career ==
=== Lewes ===
Wheeler started his career at Lewes making his first start in the Conference Premier 2008–09 season against Torquay United. He scored his first senior goal against Altrincham, scored eight times the following season and four in his final season.

=== Staines Town ===
On 26 June 2011, due to travel commitments associated with his studies at Brunel University, Wheeler left Lewes and signed with Staines Town of the Conference South as it was the closest club to the campus. He made his Staines debut on 13 August, and scored his first goals for the club on the 29th, in a 2–1 home win against Boreham Wood. He finished the season with 9 goals, and was awarded both the Players Player and Club Player of the year awards. The following season, Wheeler scored a career-best 14 goals, which helped the club to avoid relegation, and repeated his achievements of the previous season by picking up both awards in the end of season honours. Wheeler was also captain of the team for the majority of his second season at the club.

=== Exeter City ===
On 2 August 2013, Wheeler signed a deal with Exeter City of Football League Two, after impressing on a trial. He made his professional debut a day later, in a 2–1 home win against Bristol Rovers. On 30 November 2013 Wheeler scored his first professional goal in a 2–2 draw against Bury. In the 2016–17 season, Wheeler played a pivotal role in helping Exeter City reach a League Two play-off final, by scoring 13 league goals and 20 goals in all competitions for City. Wheeler was awarded as the Exeter City Player of the Year for this season.

=== Queens Park Rangers ===
On 31 August 2017, Wheeler signed for Queens Park Rangers for an undisclosed fee on a three-year deal. Wheeler scored his first QPR goal in his first start for the club, opening the scoring in a 3–2 defeat to Middlesbrough.

On 7 August 2018, Wheeler joined League One club Portsmouth on a season-long loan deal. He scored his first goal for Portsmouth in a 4–0 EFL Trophy win over Gillingham on 4 September 2018. QPR recalled Wheeler from his loan spell on 24 January 2019, he made a total of 18 appearances for Portsmouth in all competitions. The following day, Wheeler joined League Two club Milton Keynes Dons on loan for the remainder of the 2018–19 season, reuniting with his former manager at Exeter City, Paul Tisdale.

=== Wycombe Wanderers ===
Wheeler signed for Wycombe Wanderers on 30 July 2019. It was a free transfer on a three-year deal. On 26 January 2023, Wheeler published an article saying football should become less reliant on sponsorship and advertising from betting companies.

On 5 February 2025, Wheeler was announced to have departed the club, his contract having been terminated by mutual consent prior to the transfer deadline to allow him to join a new club.

=== Shrewsbury Town ===
On 20 February 2025, Wheeler joined League One side Shrewsbury Town on a short-term contract until the end of the season, reuniting with former-Wycombe Wanderers manager Gareth Ainsworth.

On 7 May 2025, Shrewsbury announced the player would be leaving the club in June when his contract expired.

== International career ==
In 2008–09, Wheeler made eight appearances for the England U18 Schoolboys.

== Career statistics ==
As of match played 12 April 2025

Appearances and goals by club, season and competition
Club	Season	League			FA Cup		League Cup		Other		Total	
Club	Season	Division	Apps	Goals	Apps	Goals	Apps	Goals	Apps	Goals	Apps	Goals
Lewes	2008–09	Conference National	19	1	—		—		—		19	1
Lewes	2009–10	Conference South	38	8	—		—		—		38	8
Lewes	2010–11	Conference South	31	4	—		—		—		31	4
Lewes	Total		88	13	—		—		—		88	13
Staines Town	2011–12	Conference South	29	9	—		—		—		29	9
Staines Town	2012–13	Conference South	41	14	—		—		—		41	14
Staines Town	Total		70	23	—		—		—		70	23
Exeter City	2013–14	League Two	35	3	1	0	1	0	1 (Note: Appearances in Football League Trophy)	0	38	3
Exeter City	2014–15	League Two	45	7	1	0	1	0	0	0	47	7
Exeter City	2015–16	League Two	31	6	3	0	2	2	2	0	38	8
Exeter City	2016–17	League Two	38	17	1	0	2	0	5 (Note: Three appearances and two goals in 2017 EFL League Two play-offs, two appearances and two goals in EFL Trophy)	4	46	21
Exeter City	2017–18	League Two	2	0	—		0	0	0	0	2	0
Exeter City	Total		151	33	6	0	6	2	8	4	171	38
Queens Park Rangers	2017–18	Championship	9	1	0	0	0	0	—		9	1
Queens Park Rangers	2018–19	Championship	0	0	—		—		—		0	0
Queens Park Rangers	Total		9	1	0	0	0	0	—		9	1
Portsmouth (loan)	2018–19	League One	11	0	2	1	1	0	4 (Note: Appearances in EFL Trophy)	2	18	3
Milton Keynes Dons (loan)	2018–19	League Two	19	4	—		—		—		19	4
Wycombe Wanderers	2019–20	League One	31	3	2	0	1	0	5 (Note: Three appearances and one goal in 2020 EFL League One play-offs, two appearances in EFL Trophy)	1	39	4
Wycombe Wanderers	2020–21	Championship	38	3	2	0	1	0	—		41	3
Wycombe Wanderers	2021–22	League One	30	2	2	0	1	0	4 (Note: Two appearances in EFL Trophy, two appearances in EFL League One play-offs)	0	37	2
Wycombe Wanderers	2022–23	League One	37	7	1	0	0	0	1	0	39	7
Wycombe Wanderers	2023–24	League One	32	3	1	0	1	0	7	0	41	3
Wycombe Wanderers	2024–25	League One	5	0	3	0	1	0	3	0	12	0
Wycombe Wanderers	Total		173	18	11	0	5	0	20	1	209	19
Shrewsbury Town	2024–25	League One	10	0	—		—		—		10	0
Career total			531	92	19	1	12	2	32	7	594	102

== Honours ==
Milton Keynes Dons

- EFL League Two third-place promotion: 2018–19

Wycombe Wanderers

- EFL League One play-offs: 2020
- EFL Trophy runner-up: 2023–24

Individual

- Staines Town Player of the Year: 2011–12, 2012–13
- Exeter City Player of the Year: 2016–17
