= Jordan Moore-Taylor =

English footballer (born 1994)

Personal information
- Full name: Jordan Alan Moore-Taylor
- Date of birth: 24 January 1994 (age 32)
- Place of birth: Exeter, England
- Height: 5 ft 11 in (1.81 m)
- Position: Defender

Team information
- Current team: Sutton United
- Number: 15

Youth career
- 2010–2012: Exeter City

Senior career*
Years	Team	Apps	(Gls)
2012–2018	Exeter City	160	(10)
2018–2020	Milton Keynes Dons	37	(1)
2020–2026	Forest Green Rovers	160	(8)
2026–	Sutton United	0	(0)
- * Club domestic league appearances and goals as of 22:09, 7 July 2026 (UTC)

Jordan Alan Moore-Taylor (born 24 January 1994) is an English professional footballer who plays as a defender for National League club Sutton United.

== Career ==
=== Exeter City ===
Born in Exeter, Moore-Taylor started his footballing career at Stoke Hill AFC before signing his first professional contract with Exeter City in summer 2012 after progressing through the club's youth academy.

Moore-Taylor made his professional debut for Exeter on 14 August 2012 in a 2–1 defeat to Crystal Palace at St James Park in the League Cup. He scored his first professional goal against Cheltenham Town in a 1–1 draw.

=== Milton Keynes Dons ===
On 19 June 2018, Moore-Taylor followed former Exeter manager Paul Tisdale to Milton Keynes Dons after six years at Exeter, signing a two-year deal after he activated a clause in his contract to leave Exeter. He scored his first goal for the club on 12 January 2019 during a 4–3 away defeat to Bury. A knee injury suffered two weeks later in a 1–0 away defeat to Grimsby Town resulted in him being sidelined for the remainder of the campaign. Following the conclusion of the 2019–20 season, Moore-Taylor was one of nine players released by the club.

=== Forest Green Rovers ===
On 21 July 2020, Moore-Taylor joined League Two club Forest Green Rovers on a two-year deal.

On 8 May 2026, the club announced it was releasing the player.

=== Sutton United ===
On 15 June 2026, Moore-Taylor agreed to join fellow National League side, Sutton United following his release from Forest Green Rovers.

== Career statistics ==
As of 17 April 2021

Appearances and goals by club, season and competition
Club	Season	League			FA Cup		League Cup		Other (Note: Includes appearances in EFL Trophy and EFL League Two play-offs.)		Total	
Club	Season	Division	Apps	Goals	Apps	Goals	Apps	Goals	Apps	Goals	Apps	Goals
Exeter City	2012–13	League Two	7	0	0	0	0	0	1	0	8	0
Exeter City	2013–14	League Two	29	1	0	0	1	0	1	0	31	1
Exeter City	2014–15	League Two	26	2	0	0	0	0	1	0	27	2
Exeter City	2015–16	League Two	32	0	4	0	0	0	2	0	38	0
Exeter City	2016–17	League Two	42	5	1	0	1	0	4	0	48	5
Exeter City	2017–18	League Two	24	2	3	1	0	0	4	0	31	3
Exeter City	Total		160	10	8	1	2	0	13	0	183	11
Milton Keynes Dons	2018–19	League Two	23	1	0	0	2	0	0	0	25	1
Milton Keynes Dons	2019–20	League One	14	0	1	0	0	0	1	0	16	0
Milton Keynes Dons	Total		37	1	1	0	2	0	1	0	41	1
Forest Green Rovers	2020–21	League Two	24	2	1	0	1	0	1	0	27	2
Career total			221	13	10	1	5	0	15	0	251	14

== Honours ==
Milton Keynes Dons

- EFL League Two third-place promotion: 2018–19

Forest Green Rovers

- EFL League Two: 2021–22
