= Luke Croll =

English footballer

Personal information
- Full name: Luke Alan Croll
- Date of birth: 10 January 1995 (age 31)
- Place of birth: Lambeth, England
- Height: 1.85 m (6 ft 1 in)
- Position: Defender

Team information
- Current team: Sydney Olympic

Youth career
- –2013: Crystal Palace

Senior career*
Years	Team	Apps	(Gls)
2013–2017	Crystal Palace	0	(0)
2013–2014	→ Harrow Borough (loan)	2	(0)
2015	→ Plymouth Argyle (loan)	3	(0)
2016–2017	→ Exeter City (loan)	19	(0)
2017–2019	Exeter City	23	(0)
2019–2021	Dagenham & Redbridge	51	(0)
2021–2022	Chesterfield	9	(1)
2023	North Carolina FC	1	(0)
2023–2024	Eastleigh	18	(1)
2025–2026	Gold Coast Knights	23	(0)
2026–	Sydney Olympic	0	(0)
- * Club domestic league appearances and goals as of 9 April 2026

Luke Alan Croll (born 10 January 1995) is an English professional footballer who plays as a defender for Sydney Olympic in the Australian Championship.

== Club career ==
=== Crystal Palace ===
Croll was born in Lambeth and joined the Crystal Palace Academy as a 9 year old. The left-sided centre-half put in a series of consistent performances for the under-21 side to earn himself a professional contract at the club, and went onto establish himself in the side that won the U21 League 2 South in the 2014–15 season. In the 2015–16 season, Croll was named as an unused substitute against Watford. Croll was released by Crystal Palace on the expiry of his contract on 30 June 2017.

==== 2013–14 Harrow Borough (loan) ====
In January 2014, Croll joined Isthmian League side Harrow Borough on a short-term loan. Croll made 2 league appearances before returning to the Crystal Palace Development side.

==== 2015–16 Plymouth Argyle (loan) ====
On 20 November 2015, Croll joined Plymouth Argyle on loan until 2 January 2016.

==== 2016–17 Exeter City (loan) ====
On deadline day, Croll joined Exeter City on loan until 14 January 2017. The loan period was later extended until the end of the 2016–17 season.

=== Exeter City ===
In June 2017, Croll signed a permanent deal with Exeter after being released by Crystal Palace. He was released by Exeter at the end of the 2018–19 season.

=== Dagenham & Redbridge ===
In July 2019 he signed for National League side Dagenham & Redbridge on a one-year contract. He was released by Dagenham along with five others in June 2021 following the expiration of his contract.

=== Chesterfield ===
On 6 November 2021, Croll joined National League side Chesterfield on a short-term deal. He made his debut later that day, making an impressive debut that saw him score as Chesterfield defeated Southend United in the FA Cup first round.

=== North Carolina FC ===
On 2 February 2023, Croll signed with North Carolina FC of the USL League One, the third-tier of US soccer.

=== Eastleigh ===
In December 2023, Croll returned to England, joining National League club Eastleigh. He departed the club at the end of the 2023–24 season.

=== Sydney Olympic ===
In September 2026, Croll joined Australian Championship club Sydney Olympic.

== Career statistics ==
As of match played 5 February 2022

Appearances and goals by club, season and competition
Club	Season	League			FA Cup		EFL Cup		Other		Total	
Club	Season	Division	Apps	Goals	Apps	Goals	Apps	Goals	Apps	Goals	Apps	Goals
Crystal Palace	2013–14	Premier League	0	0	0	0	0	0	—		0	0
Crystal Palace	2014–15	Premier League	0	0	0	0	0	0	—		0	0
Crystal Palace	2015–16	Premier League	0	0	0	0	0	0	—		0	0
Crystal Palace	2016–17	Premier League	0	0	0	0	0	0	—		0	0
Crystal Palace	Total		0	0	0	0	0	0	0	0	0	0
Harrow Borough (loan)	2013–14	IL Premier Division	2	0	0	0	—		0	0	2	0
Plymouth Argyle (loan)	2015–16	League Two	3	0	0	0	0	0	0	0	3	0
Exeter City (loan)	2016–17	League Two	19	0	0	0	0	0	1 (Note: Appearance(s) in EFL Trophy)	0	20	0
Exeter City	2017–18	League Two	10	0	0	0	1	0	2	0	13	0
Exeter City	2018–19	League Two	13	0	1	0	1	0	3	0	18	0
Exeter City	Total		42	0	1	0	2	0	6	0	51	0
Dagenham & Redbridge	2019–20	National League	30	0	1	0	—		2 (Note: Appearance(s) in FA Trophy)	0	33	0
Dagenham & Redbridge	2020–21	National League	21	0	2	0	—		2	0	25	0
Dagenham & Redbridge	Total		51	0	3	0	0	0	4	0	58	0
Chesterfield	2021–22	National League	9	0	3	1	—		0	0	12	1
Career total			107	0	7	1	2	0	10	0	126	1
