= Reuben Reid =

English footballer (born 1988)

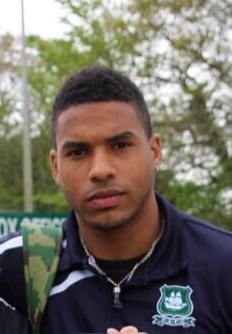
- Reid in 2014

Personal information
- Full name: Reuben James Reid
- Date of birth: 26 July 1988 (age 38)
- Place of birth: Bristol, England
- Height: 6 ft 0 in (1.83 m)
- Position: Striker

Team information
- Current team: Bath City
- Number: 18

Youth career
- 2005–2006: Plymouth Argyle

Senior career*
Years	Team	Apps	(Gls)
2006–2008	Plymouth Argyle	7	(0)
2006	→ Kidderminster Harriers (loan)	6	(2)
2007	→ Rochdale (loan)	2	(0)
2007	→ Torquay United (loan)	7	(2)
2007–2008	→ Wycombe Wanderers (loan)	11	(1)
2008	→ Brentford (loan)	10	(1)
2008–2009	Rotherham United	41	(18)
2009–2011	West Bromwich Albion	4	(0)
2010	→ Peterborough United (loan)	13	(0)
2010–2011	→ Walsall (loan)	18	(3)
2011–2012	Oldham Athletic	39	(7)
2012–2014	Yeovil Town	19	(4)
2013	→ Plymouth Argyle (loan)	18	(2)
2013–2014	→ Plymouth Argyle (loan)	46	(17)
2014–2016	Plymouth Argyle	70	(25)
2016–2018	Exeter City	57	(20)
2018–2019	Forest Green Rovers	50	(13)
2019–2021	Cheltenham Town	21	(5)
2021–2022	Yeovil Town	49	(6)
2022–2025	Weston-super-Mare	113	(27)
2025–2026	Weymouth	31	(5)
2026–	Bath City	6	(1)
- * Club domestic league appearances and goals as of 13:38, 6 September 2026 (UTC)

Reuben James Reid (born 26 July 1988) is an English professional footballer who plays as a striker who plays for Southern Football League club Bath City.

Born in Bristol, he has played in the Football League for Plymouth Argyle, Rochdale, Torquay United, Wycombe Wanderers, Brentford, Rotherham United, West Bromwich Albion, Peterborough United, Walsall, Oldham Athletic, Yeovil Town, Exeter City, Forest Green Rovers and Cheltenham Town.

== Career ==
=== Plymouth Argyle ===
Reid was born in Bristol and attended Fairfield Grammar School. He joined Plymouth Argyle early in the 2005–06 season after attending trials with Manchester United and Crystal Palace. He soon impressed, playing for the youth team, with his quick feet, strong upper body, and regular goals. Reid gave up the chance of a professional cricket career with Gloucestershire, having played for their second XI, to pursue his career with Argyle and was rewarded with a professional contract in February 2006, along with fellow trainees Scott Laird and Chris Zebroski. He made his debut in the final game of the season against Ipswich Town. He signed a one-year contract the following close-season, with a further year's extension being agree in September 2006.

On 5 October 2006 he joined Kidderminster Harriers on a one-month loan and scored on his debut for them two days later. He was sent off in the final game of his loan spell, a 1–1 draw away to Exeter City and was recalled by Plymouth after being banned for three games. On returning to Plymouth, Reid played in both FA Cup 3rd round ties against Peterborough United, as well as making a couple of league substitute appearances, before going out on loan for the rest of the 2006–07 season to Rochdale on 25 January 2007. However, Rochdale ended his loan after a month, with Plymouth manager Ian Holloway reported as saying "They did not want him there any more. It is internal and I deal with it". Reid was suspended by Holloway for two weeks on his return to Plymouth.

On 22 March 2007, Reid joined Torquay United on loan until the end of the season. He made his debut as a second-half substitute for Ryan Dickson, also on loan from Plymouth, and scored a last minute winner as Torquay won 1–0 at home to Stockport County. He started the next game, scoring as Torquay lost 2–1 at home to Walsall.

Reid played in Argyle's first two League Cup games of the 2007–08 season, before being loaned to Wycombe Wanderers on 31 August 2007 for the remainder of the season. On 15 September 2007, Reid came on as a substitute to make his Wycombe debut against Macclesfield Town, and scored in the 89th minute. Wycombe ended his loan spell early. and Reid returned to Argyle in December only to be told by new Plymouth Argyle manager Paul Sturrock that he would be released at the end of the season. He joined Brentford on a three-month loan deal on 31 January 2008. He scored his first and only goal for the club in a 3–1 defeat at Darlington.

=== Rotherham United ===
He had a trial with Oxford United in June 2008, but signed for Rotherham United on 22 July 2008, after impressing on trial during the 2008–09 pre-season. He made an immediate impact to the squad, scoring the only goal as Rotherham won 1–0 at home to Lincoln City in the first game of the season. He became an instant hit with the Millers' faithful, scoring both the equaliser and winning penalty against local rivals Sheffield Wednesday in the League Cup. In the next round, Reid scored the winning penalty again, this time to knock out Championship leaders Wolverhampton Wanderers. Reid scored his first ever hat-trick in the Millers' 5–1 demolition of relegation threatened Chester City, it was the first time he'd scored more than one goal in a game, the following weekend he scored again in Rotherham's 2–1 over promotion chasing Rochdale, he also smashed a penalty against the bar. This goal took his tally to 13 for the season in all competitions. In the Millers next home game against local rivals Chesterfield, Reid bagged two goals including a superb lob in the Millers' 3–0 win. In the Millers next game, against Bury, he scored a penalty in a 1–1 draw. Reid then added another two goals to his overall tally, when he scored in the Millers' mid-week 4–2 win over doomed Luton Town, and an audacious 30-yard strike in the 1–0 win over Aldershot Town, to take him to 19 in all competitions.

=== West Bromwich Albion ===
In the summer of 2009, Reid looked set to move to work under Ian Holloway at Blackpool but instead signed for West Bromwich Albion for an undisclosed amount. He made his West Brom debut away at Bury in the 1st round of the League Cup on 11 August, but struggled to nail down a first team place consistently due to high competition on the forward line.

=== Peterborough United ===
Reid moved on loan to Peterborough United in January 2010 and was scheduled to remain there for three months, but was recalled by his parent club prior to the end of his 93 days. On 23 January 2010, Reid made his debut for Peterborough in a 2–1 loss against Sheffield Wednesday.

=== Walsall ===
Reid signed on loan for Walsall on 19 August 2010 until January 2011. Manager Chris Hutchings described Reid as "a young, hungry player with a proven track record [who] can play out wide or through the middle." He scored his first goal for Walsall on his debut against Plymouth Argyle on 21 August 2010, scoring the winning goal in the 70th minute of the 2–1 victory. Reid said he was grateful to Walsall for giving him the chance to play regularly.

=== Oldham Athletic ===
On 28 January 2011, Oldham Athletic signed Reid from West Bromwich Albion until the end of the season with an option to extend. He made his début the day after signing, coming on as a substitute against the 2–2 draw against Carlisle United, and made his first full start against Huddersfield Town on 12 February 2011 in a 0–0 draw at the Galpharm Stadium. His first goal for the club was the final goal scored against Hartlepool United in a 4–0 win on 1 February, and although he scored a second in a 2–0 win against Notts County, at the end of the season it was confirmed that the option to extend had not been taken up by the club.

On 20 May, however, Oldham announced that Reid had informed them he wanted to exercise an option to stay on reduced terms, and as such he had agreed a new deal for the 2011–12 season. He started the season well, scoring five goals before the end of September, but a thigh injury sustained in early October against Milton Keynes Dons kept him out of the reckoning till March. After that he was unable to re-establish himself as a regular, and scored just one goal, which came in a 3–2 defeat at Rochdale.

He was released by Oldham at the end of the 2011–12 season, along with eight other players.

=== Yeovil Town ===
Keen to move closer to his home in Bristol, Reid signed a two-year deal with League One side Yeovil Town, to take effect on 1 July 2012. Manager Gary Johnson commented favourably on the player's pace and power. On his move, Reid says moving to Yeovil could improve his form. He scored his first goal for Yeovil in a 4–0 win against Scunthorpe, and followed this by scoring twice against former club West Brom in a 4–2 defeat the next Tuesday.

==== Loan spells at Plymouth Argyle ====
Reid returned to Plymouth Argyle in January 2013 on loan for one month. It was extended for a second month in March after Reid made six appearances without scoring a goal. Reid scored his first goal for the club in a 2–0 win at Southend United, and at the end of the month the loan was extended until the end of the season.

In June 2013, it was confirmed Reid would rejoin Plymouth Argyle on loan until the end of the 2013–14 season.

Reid scored 21 goals for Plymouth in the 2013–14 season, being the first Plymouth striker to score 20+ goals in one season since Tommy Tynan in 1984. He also became the first Argyle player to score a hattrick since Vincent Péricard in 2006. He was awarded the Plymouth Argyle player of the season award on the last home game of the season.

Reid returned to Yeovil before being released at the end of the 2013–14 season, along with three other players.

=== Return to Plymouth Argyle ===
After several weeks of speculation, Reid signed a two-year contract with Plymouth Argyle in June 2014. He scored a hat-trick in the Derby match at Exeter City on 21 February 2015. He was offered a new contract at the end of the 2015–16 season but chose to move on.

=== Exeter City ===
Reid joined Exeter City on 13 September 2016. Reid scored his first goal for Exeter in a 4–1 win at Barnet on 15 October 2016.

=== Forest Green Rovers ===
On 5 January 2018, Reid signed for fellow League Two club Forest Green Rovers for an undisclosed fee on a two-and-a-half-year deal, scoring the only goal in a 1–0 victory over Port Vale a day later.

He was transfer listed by Forest Green Rovers at the end of the 2018–19 season.

=== Cheltenham Town ===
On 24 June 2019, it was announced that Reid had agreed to join local rivals Cheltenham Town on a free transfer.

=== Yeovil Town ===
On 5 January 2021, Reid re-joined National League side Yeovil Town until the end of the 2020–21 season. At the end of the 2021–22 season, Reid was released by Yeovil following the expiry of his contract.

=== Weston-super-Mare ===
In June 2022, Reid joined Southern Football League Premier South club Weston-super-Mare. At the end of the 2024–25 season, Reid left Weston-super-Mare following the expiry of his contract having scored 34 goals and assisted 34 in 131 games.

== Career statistics ==
As of match played 5 September 2026

Appearances and goals by club, season and competition
Club	Season	League			FA Cup		League Cup		Other		Total	
Club	Season	Division	Apps	Goals	Apps	Goals	Apps	Goals	Apps	Goals	Apps	Goals
Plymouth Argyle	2005–06	Championship	1	0	0	0	0	0	—		1	0
Plymouth Argyle	2006–07	Championship	6	0	2	0	1	0	—		9	0
Plymouth Argyle	2007–08	Championship	0	0	0	0	2	0	—		2	0
Plymouth Argyle	Total		7	0	2	0	3	0	—		12	0
Kidderminster Harriers (loan)	2006–07	Conference Premier	6	2	—		—		0	0	6	2
Rochdale (loan)	2006–07	League Two	2	0	—		—		0	0	2	0
Torquay United (loan)	2006–07	League Two	7	2	—		—		0	0	7	2
Wycombe Wanderers (loan)	2007–08	League Two	11	1	0	0	—		1 (Note: Appearance(s) in Football League Trophy)	0	12	1
Brentford (loan)	2007–08	League Two	10	1	0	0	—		—		10	1
Rotherham United	2008–09	League Two	41	18	2	0	4	1	4	0	50	19
West Bromwich Albion	2009–10	Championship	4	0	1	0	2	0	—		7	0
West Bromwich Albion	2010–11	Premier League	0	0	0	0	0	0	—		0	0
West Bromwich Albion	Total		4	0	1	0	2	0	—		7	0
Peterborough United (loan)	2009–10	Championship	13	0	0	0	0	0	—		13	0
Walsall (loan)	2010–11	League One	18	3	2	2	0	0	1	1	21	6
Oldham Athletic	2010–11	League One	19	2	—		—		—		19	2
Oldham Athletic	2011–12	League One	20	5	0	0	1	1	1	0	22	6
Oldham Athletic	Total		39	7	0	0	1	1	1	0	41	8
Yeovil Town	2012–13	League One	19	4	1	0	2	2	3	0	25	6
Plymouth Argyle (loan)	2012–13	League Two	18	2	—		—		—		18	2
Plymouth Argyle (loan)	2013–14	League Two	46	17	5	4	1	0	2	0	54	21
Plymouth Argyle	2014–15	League Two	42	18	2	0	1	2	4 (Note: Two appearances in Football League Trophy, two appearances in Football League Two play-offs)	0	49	20
Plymouth Argyle	2015–16	League Two	29	7	0	0	1	0	2 (Note: One appearance in Football League Trophy, one appearance in League Two play-offs)	0	32	7
Plymouth Argyle	Total		135	44	7	4	3	2	8	0	153	50
Exeter City	2016–17	League Two	36	13	1	1	0	0	4 (Note: Two appearances in EFL Trophy, two appearances in League Two play-offs)	0	41	14
Exeter City	2017–18	League Two	21	7	2	0	1	0	2 (Note: Appearance(s) in EFL Trophy)	1	26	8
Exeter City	Total		57	20	3	1	1	0	6	1	67	22
Forest Green Rovers	2017–18	League Two	21	6	—		—		—		21	6
Forest Green Rovers	2018–19	League Two	29	7	2	0	2	0	1	0	34	7
Forest Green Rovers	Total		50	13	2	0	2	0	1	0	55	13
Cheltenham Town	2019–20	League Two	9	3	2	1	0	0	3 (Note: One appearance in EFL Trophy, two appearances in League Two play-offs)	0	14	4
Cheltenham Town	2020–21	League Two	12	2	1	0	1	0	4	3	18	5
Cheltenham Town	Total		21	5	3	1	1	0	7	3	32	9
Yeovil Town	2020–21	National League	26	3	—		—		—		26	3
Yeovil Town	2021–22	National League	23	3	2	0	—		4 (Note: Two appearances in FA Trophy, two appearances in Somerset Premier Cup)	0	29	3
Yeovil Town	Total		49	6	2	0	—		4	0	55	6
Weston-super-Mare	2022–23	Southern League; Premier Division South	36	5	4	5	—		2 (Note: Appearances in FA Trophy)	0	42	10
Weston-super-Mare	2023–24	National League South	37	12	3	1	—		3	0	43	13
Weston-super-Mare	2024–25	National League South	40	10	5	1	—		1	0	46	11
Weston-super-Mare	Total		113	27	12	7	—		6	0	131	34
Weymouth	2025–26	Southern League; Premier Division South	31	5	1	0	—		2 (Note: One appearance in FA Trophy, one appearance in Dorset Senior Cup)	2	34	7
Bath City	2026–27	Southern League; Premier Division South	6	1	1	0	—		0	0	7	1
Career total			639	159	39	15	19	6	44	7	741	187

== Honours ==
West Bromwich Albion

- Football League Championship runner-up: 2009–10

Cheltenham Town

- EFL League Two: 2020–21

Weston Super Mare

- Southern League Premier Division South: 2022–23

Weymouth

- Dorset Senior Cup: 2025–26

Individual

- PFA Team of the Year: 2014–15 League Two
