= Ollie Watkins =

English footballer (born 1995)

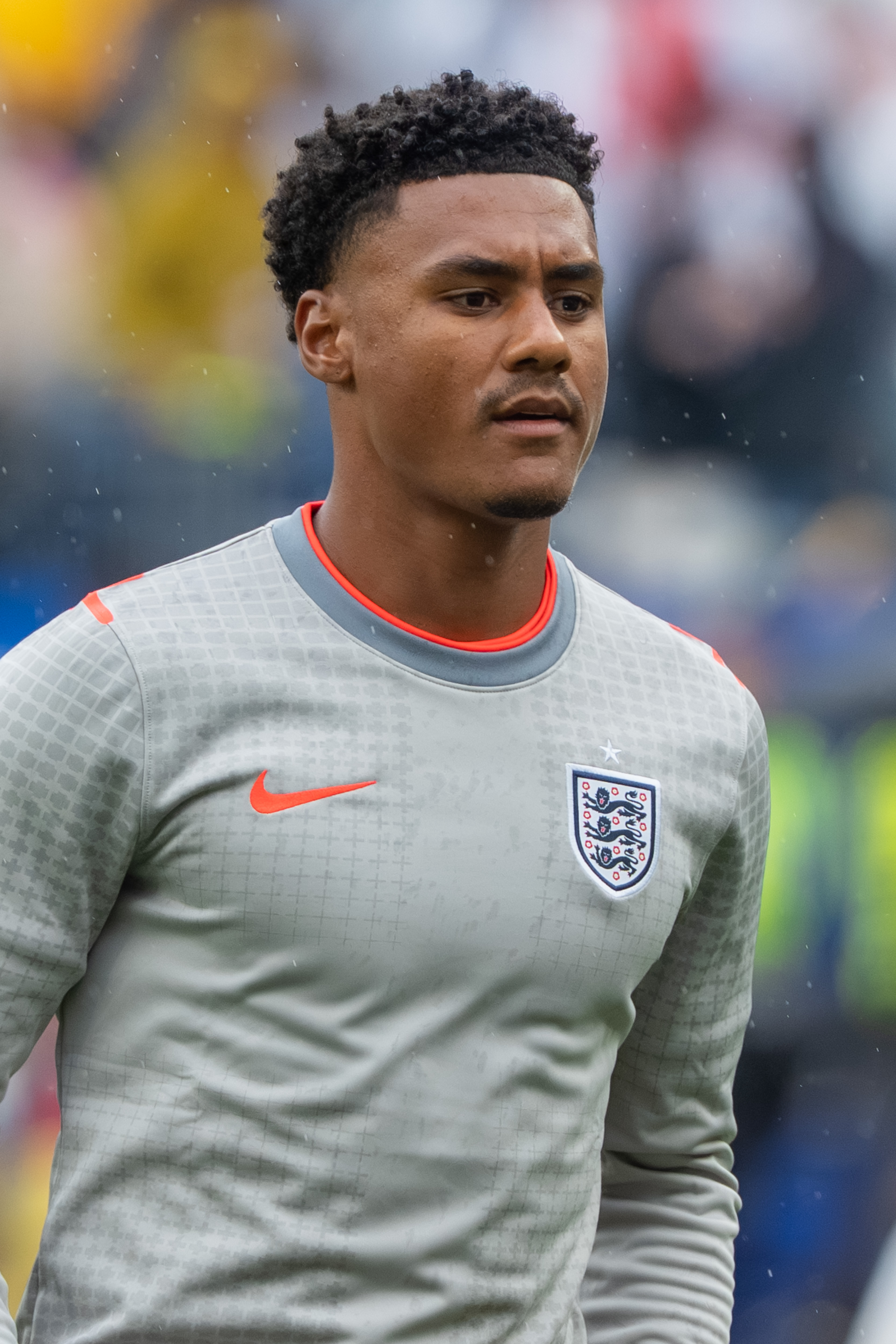
- Watkins with England in 2026

Personal information
- Full name: Oliver George Arthur Watkins
- Date of birth: 30 December 1995 (age 30)
- Place of birth: Torquay, Devon, England
- Height: 5 ft 11 in (1.80 m)
- Position: Forward

Team information
- Current team: Al-Hilal
- Number: 11

Youth career
- 2002–2003: Buckland Athletic
- 2003–2004: Newton Town
- 2004–2014: Exeter City

Senior career*
Years	Team	Apps	(Gls)
2014–2017	Exeter City	68	(21)
2014–2015	→ Weston-super-Mare (loan)	24	(10)
2017–2020	Brentford	132	(45)
2020–2026	Aston Villa	221	(91)
2026–	Al-Hilal	8	(5)

International career^{‡}
2021–	England	24	(7)
Medal record
Men's football
Representing England
FIFA World Cup
Third place	2026 Canada–Mexico–US
UEFA European Championship
Runner-up	2024 Germany
- * Club domestic league appearances and goals as of 21:01, 31 October 2026 (UTC) ‡ National team caps and goals as of 23:05, 18 July 2026 (UTC)

Oliver George Arthur Watkins (born 30 December 1995) is an English professional footballer who plays as a forward for Saudi Pro League club Al-Hilal and the England national team. Described as a complete forward, Watkins is known for his finishing ability and work ethic.

Watkins is a product of the Exeter City academy and made his breakthrough at the club, winning the EFL Young Player of the Year award, before departing in 2017 for Brentford. He had a successful three-year spell at the club, culminating in being the joint top-scorer in the 2019–20 Championship and being named Championship Player of the Year in 2020.

In September 2020, Watkins signed for Aston Villa. In May 2024, he was named Premier League Playmaker of the Season for the 2023–24 season. In May 2025, Watkins became Aston Villa's all-time top Premier League scorer, overtaking Gabriel Agbonlahor's record of 74 goals.

Watkins made his debut for the England national team in a World Cup qualifying match against San Marino in March 2021, also scoring his first international goal against the side. Watkins then went on to represent England at UEFA Euro 2024 and the 2026 FIFA World Cup.

== Early and personal life ==
Oliver George Arthur Watkins was born on 30 December 1995 at Torbay Hospital in Torquay, Devon. He is of Jamaican descent and professes to be an Arsenal supporter. He was raised by his mother Delsi-May, who is a professional singer.

Watkins grew up in Newton Abbot and he attended South Dartmoor Community College in Ashburton together with Matt Jay and Jamie Reid. He began playing grassroots football with the academy of Buckland Athletic at six years of age. Thereafter, he joined neighbouring Newton Town F.C. for one season and also represented the Devon County Football Association alongside Sam Gallagher.

On 18 May 2025, Watkins married his long time partner Ellie Alderson, with whom he has two children. Watkins's former Brentford teammate, Neal Maupay, named his son Ollie after Watkins.

== Club career ==
=== Exeter City ===
==== Early career ====
Watkins joined Exeter City's academy at Under-11 level, having previously failed a trial with the club at the age of nine in 2003. He rose through the youth ranks to sign a scholarship deal in 2012. In April 2014, he signed a two-year professional contract after scoring 30 goals for the Under-18 team in its 2013–14 Football League Youth Alliance South West Conference-winning season.

Watkins won his maiden first-team call up when he was named as a substitute for the final League Two match of the 2013–14 season versus Hartlepool United and made his senior debut when he replaced Aaron Dawson after 77 minutes of the 2–0 victory. Watkins was frequently named as a substitute by Paul Tisdale during the first three months of the 2014–15 season, but despite scoring his first senior goal (a late consolation in a 3–1 Football League Trophy second round defeat to Coventry City on 7 October 2014), he made just three appearances before departing on loan to Weston-super-Mare for the remainder of the season in December 2014.

On 8 December 2014, Watkins joined Conference South club Weston-super-Mare on a one-month loan. Through repeated extensions of the loan, Watkins would remain with the club until the end of the 2014–15 season. He featured regularly for the team, scoring 10 goals in 25 appearances before returning to Exeter at the end of the season.

==== 2015–2017: First-team breakthrough ====
After failing to be named in a first-team squad during the opening two months of the 2015–16 season, Watkins broke onto the substitutes' bench in October 2015 and made his first appearance of the season late in the month. He made his first start for Exeter City in a 2–1 Devon derby victory over Plymouth Argyle on 6 December and scored his first goal of the season with the Grecians' second in a 2–0 FA Cup second round victory over Port Vale in the following match.

During March 2016, Watkins had broken into the starting line-up. That same month, he scored four goals in six appearances to win the Football League Young Player of the Month and PFA Fans' Player of the Month awards. His goalscoring run extended into mid-April and finished with 8 goals in 10 appearances. Two of these goals came in the return Devon derby with Plymouth Argyle, in which his late brace sealed a 2–1 comeback victory and the second goal was subsequently voted as the club's Goal of the Season. Watkins finished the 2015–16 season with 10 goals in 22 appearances.

Watkins' performances in the final two months of the 2015–16 season saw him enter 2016–17 as an established member of the first-team squad. He had an eventful season, making 52 appearances, scoring 16 goals, and contributing 13 assists, though the campaign ended with Exeter losing 2–1 to Blackpool in the 2017 League Two play-off final at Wembley Stadium. Watkins scored the first hat-trick of his career in a 4–1 win over Newport County on 31 December 2016 and his two goals and five assists in January 2017 saw him win the League Two Player of the Month award. On 9 April, he was awarded the EFL Young Player of the Year award for his performances during the season.

=== Brentford ===
On 18 July 2017, Watkins joined Championship club Brentford on a four-year contract, with an option for a further year, for an undisclosed fee, reported to be £1.8 million. He scored his first goal for Brentford on 8 August in their 3–1 extra-time victory away to AFC Wimbledon in the EFL Cup first round.

On 9 August 2019, Watkins signed a new four-year contract with a one-year extension option. He scored his first hat-trick for the club in the Championship against Barnsley in a 3–1 win on 29 September. Watkins made 50 appearances and scored 26 goals in all competitions during the 2019–20 season, which ended with defeat in the 2020 Championship play-off final.

=== Aston Villa ===
==== 2020–2023 ====
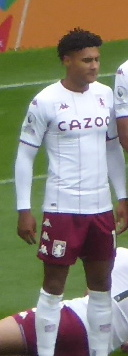
Watkins playing for Aston Villa in 2021

On 9 September 2020, Watkins joined Premier League club Aston Villa on a five-year contract, for a then club-record fee of £28 million, which could rise to £33 million. Exeter City made £4 million and a further £750,000 in additional performance related add-ons from the transfer as they had inserted a sell-on clause when Watkins was sold to Brentford. In joining Aston Villa, Watkins was reunited with manager Dean Smith, who had signed him for Brentford. On 15 September, Watkins made his Aston Villa debut, scoring in a 3–1 away win in the EFL Cup against Burton Albion. He went on to make his Premier League debut on 21 September, in a 1–0 home win against Sheffield United.

On 4 October 2020, Watkins scored his first Premier League goals, scoring through a left footed strike, a right footed strike and a header for a perfect hat-trick in a 7–2 home victory over champions Liverpool. It was Liverpool's heaviest defeat in 57 years and was the first time in Premier League history that a reigning champion had conceded 7 goals in a single match. On 10 April 2021, Watkins scored against Liverpool again, becoming the first player since Andrey Arshavin in the 2008–09 season to score as many as four goals against Liverpool in a single Premier League season. With 14 goals, he became Aston Villa's top scorer of the 2020–21 season.

On 25 February 2023, Watkins scored in his fifth consecutive Premier League match, a 2–0 win away to Everton, becoming the first Aston Villa player to achieve this feat.

==== 2023–2026 ====
On 23 August 2023, Watkins scored a hat-trick in Villa's 5–0 win against Hibernian in the 2023–24 UEFA Europa Conference League play-off round, which ensured the team's qualification for the group stage. On 30 September, he scored his second hat-trick of the 2023–24 season and his third for Aston Villa in a 6–1 home win over Brighton & Hove Albion. On 6 October, Watkins signed a new contract with Aston Villa, committing his future to the club until 2028. On 14 April 2024, he scored a goal in a 2–0 away win over Arsenal, in which he became the joint-top scorer for Aston Villa in a single Premier League season, 19 goals without penalty kicks, equaling Christian Benteke's record in 2012–13. On 14 May 2024, at Aston Villa's 2023–24, Watkins was voted Supporters' and Players' Player of the Season.

At the end of the season, Watkins won the Premier League Playmaker of the Season award for the most assists of the season, with 13. Watkins was also named in the Premier League Fan Team of the Season.

Watkins' first goals of the 2024–25 season season came in a 3–2 home win against Everton in the Premier League, with Watkins scoring twice in the second half to earn him the Man of the Match award. On 29 January 2025, he scored his first UEFA Champions League goal, provided two assists and missed a penalty in a 4–2 victory over Celtic. Watkins scored after 30 seconds against Newcastle United on 19 April, a game Villa went on to win 4–1. This put him on 74 Premier League goals for Villa, drawing him level with Gabriel Agbonlahor for most goals in the league for the club. On 10 May, he broke the previous record, scoring his 75th goal for Villa in a 1–0 away win over Bournemouth.

In November 2025, Aston Villa manager Unai Emery announced that Watkins was one of Aston Villa's deputy captains, behind captain John McGinn and vice captain Ezri Konsa. A month later, on 27 December, he netted a brace in a 2–1 away win over Chelsea, helping his team secure an 11-match winning streak that matched club records previously achieved in September 1897 and March 1914.

On 16 April 2026, Watkins scored his 100th Aston Villa goal during a 4–0 Europa League quarter-final victory over Bologna, becoming Aston Villa's joint 10th all-time goalscorer and their all-time top European goalscorer. A month later, on 15 May, he netted a brace in a 4–2 win over Liverpool, securing his club's place in the 2026–27 UEFA Champions League.

In an attempt to force a move to Saudi Pro League club Al-Hilal, Watkins did not turn up to pre-season training and refused to play in the opening game of the 2026–27 season against Brighton & Hove Albion. With Aston Villa's other two strikers Tammy Abraham and Brian Madjo injured, it left Villa without a striker in a match they lost 4–0. Unai Emery told media that Watkins subsequently apologised to him and his teammates for the act.

=== Al-Hilal ===
On 30 August 2026, Watkins joined Al-Hilal for an undisclosed fee, reported to be around £51 million. Two days later, he scored his first goal on his debut in a 3–0 victory over Al-Ahli.

== International career ==
On 18 March 2021, Watkins was named in Gareth Southgate's England squad for 2022 FIFA World Cup qualification matches against San Marino, Albania and Poland. On 25 March 2021, Watkins made his England debut as a second-half substitute in a 5–0 victory over San Marino at Wembley. He subsequently scored his first England goal with his first shot on target in an England shirt.

Watkins was named in the provisional England squad for UEFA Euro 2020 in May 2021. However, he was not selected in the final 26-man squad for the tournament.

Watkins made his first start for England on 29 March 2022 at Wembley in a friendly against the Ivory Coast, scoring the opening goal in the 30th minute of the 3–0 win.

Watkins was not included in England's squad for any of their 2022–23 UEFA Nations League matches or the 2022 FIFA World Cup. He was recalled to the squad in October 2023 for the first time in 18 months and, on 13 October, started in a friendly with Australia, scoring the only goal of the match.

He was named in England's 26-man squad for UEFA Euro 2024. In England's semi-final against the Netherlands, Watkins along with Cole Palmer came off the bench in the 81st minute, with the latter assisting him to score the winning goal in the 90th minute, sending England to the final.

On 22 May 2026, Watkins was selected in the 26-man squad for the 2026 FIFA World Cup.

== Style of play ==
Throughout 2023 and 2024, Watkins was frequently described by media sources as one of the best centre-forwards in Europe and the world.

Watkins has described himself as "a number 10", and in 2017 named Thierry Henry as his idol, saying "I try to base my game on his, by driving at defenders and looking to make something happen when I get the ball". He is also capable of playing as a winger, and was adapted into a more traditional centre-forward at Brentford during the 2019–20 season. Under Unai Emery at Aston Villa, Watkins began to play as a number 9, not only scoring but setting up goals for teammates. He has been described as a complete forward and received praise for his attacking runs, speed, work ethic, finishing and versatility.

== Career statistics ==
=== Club ===
As of match played 19 October 2026

Appearances and goals by club, season and competition
Club	Season	League			National cup (Note: Includes FA Cup)		League cup (Note: Includes EFL Cup)		Continental		Other		Total	
Club	Season	Division	Apps	Goals	Apps	Goals	Apps	Goals	Apps	Goals	Apps	Goals	Apps	Goals
Exeter City	2013–14	League Two	1	0	0	0	0	0	—		0	0	1	0
Exeter City	2014–15	League Two	2	0	0	0	0	0	—		1 (Note: Appearance in Football League Trophy)	1	3	1
Exeter City	2015–16	League Two	20	8	2	1	0	0	—		0	0	22	9
Exeter City	2016–17	League Two	45	13	0	0	2	0	—		5 (Note: Two appearances and one goal in EFL Trophy, three appearances and two goals in League Two play-offs)	3	52	16
Exeter City	Total		68	21	2	1	2	0	—		6	4	78	26
Weston-super-Mare (loan)	2014–15	Conference South	24	10	—		—		—		1 (Note: Appearance in FA Trophy)	0	25	10
Brentford	2017–18	Championship	45	10	1	0	2	1	—		—		48	11
Brentford	2018–19	Championship	41	10	3	2	1	0	—		—		45	12
Brentford	2019–20	Championship	46	25	0	0	1	0	—		3 (Note: Appearances in Championship play-offs)	1	50	26
Brentford	Total		132	45	4	2	4	1	—		3	1	143	49
Aston Villa	2020–21	Premier League	37	14	0	0	3	2	—		—		40	16
Aston Villa	2021–22	Premier League	35	11	1	0	0	0	—		—		36	11
Aston Villa	2022–23	Premier League	37	15	1	0	2	1	—		—		40	16
Aston Villa	2023–24	Premier League	37	19	3	0	1	0	12 (Note: Appearances in UEFA Europa Conference League)	8	—		53	27
Aston Villa	2024–25	Premier League	38	16	4	0	0	0	12 (Note: Appearances in UEFA Champions League)	1	—		54	17
Aston Villa	2025–26	Premier League	37	16	2	0	1	0	15 (Note: Appearances in UEFA Europa League)	5	—		55	21
Aston Villa	Total		221	91	11	0	7	3	39	14	—		278	108
Al-Hilal	2026–27	Saudi Pro League	6	4	0	0	—		1 (Note: Appearance in AFC Champions League Elite)	1	—		7	5
Career total			451	171	17	3	13	4	40	15	10	5	531	198

=== International ===
As of match played 18 July 2026

Appearances and goals by national team and year
National team	Year	Apps	Goals
England	2021	5	1
England	2022	2	1
England	2023	2	1
England	2024	9	2
England	2025	2	1
England	2026	4	1
Total		24	7

As of match played 10 June 2026
England score listed first, score column indicates score after each Watkins goal

List of international goals scored by Ollie Watkins
No.	Date	Venue	Cap	Opponent	Score	Result	Competition	Ref.
1	25 March 2021	Wembley Stadium, London, England	1	San Marino	5–0	5–0	2022 FIFA World Cup qualification	
2	29 March 2022	Wembley Stadium, London, England	7	Ivory Coast	1–0	3–0	Friendly	
3	13 October 2023	Wembley Stadium, London, England	8	Australia	1–0	1–0	Friendly	
4	10 July 2024	Westfalenstadion, Dortmund, Germany	14	Netherlands	2–1	2–1	UEFA Euro 2024	
5	14 November 2024	Olympic Stadium, Athens, Greece	18	Greece	1–0	3–0	2024–25 UEFA Nations League B	
6	9 October 2025	Wembley Stadium, London, England	20	Wales	2–0	3–0	Friendly	
7	10 June 2026	Inter&Co Stadium, Orlando, United States	22	Costa Rica	3–0	3–0	Friendly	

== Honours ==
Aston Villa

- UEFA Europa League: 2025–26

England

- UEFA European Championship runner-up: 2024
- FIFA World Cup third place: 2026

Individual

- PFA Fans' Player of the Month: March 2016
- Football League Young Player of the Month: March 2016
- EFL League Two Player of the Month: January 2017
- EFL Young Player of the Year: April 2017
- EFL Championship Player of the Year: 2019–20
- PFA Team of the Year: 2019–20 Championship, 2023–24 Premier League
- Aston Villa Supporters' Player of the Season: 2023–24
- Aston Villa Players' Player of the Season: 2023–24
- Premier League Playmaker of the Season: 2023–24
- Premier League Fan Team of the Season: 2023–24
- The Athletic Premier League Team of the Season: 2023–24
