= Kyle Egan =

English footballer (born 1998)

Personal information
- Date of birth: 5 December 1998 (age 27)
- Place of birth: Bristol, England
- Position: Defender

Team information
- Current team: Truro City

Senior career*
Years	Team	Apps	(Gls)
2016–2017	Exeter City	1	(0)
2016	→ Bideford (loan)		
2017	→ Dorchester Town (loan)	29	(2)
2018–2020	Dorchester Town	46	(1)
2020–2022	Tiverton Town		
2022–	Truro City		
- * Club domestic league appearances and goals

Kyle Egan (born 5 December 1998) is an English footballer who plays for Truro City.

== Career ==
Egan began his career with Exeter City and made his professional debut on 13 August 2016 in a 2–1 defeat against Hartlepool United.

Egan had previously joined Bideford on loan in March 2016, and in March 2017, he joined Dorchester Town on loan for the rest of the season.
