= List of English football transfers summer 2010 =

This is a list of English football transfers for the 2010 summer transfer window. Only moves featuring at least one Premier League or Championship club are listed.

The summer transfer window began once clubs had concluded their final domestic fixture of the 2009–10 season (only for teams in the same association), but many transfers only officially went through on 1 July because the majority of the contracts finished on 30 June. The window remained open until 18:00 BST on 31 August 2010. Transfers between English and foreign clubs could only be made from 9 June 2010 onward.

Players without a club could join one at any time, either during or in between transfer windows. Clubs outside the Premier League could also sign players on loan at any time. If need be, clubs could sign a goalkeeper on an emergency loan, if all others were unavailable.

== Transfers ==
Date	Name	Moving from	Moving to	Fee
2 February 2010	Mark Connolly	Bolton Wanderers	St Johnstone	Loan
3 February 2010	Giles Barnes	Unattached	West Bromwich Albion	Free
3 February 2010	Ricardo Rocha	Unattached	Portsmouth	Free
4 February 2010	Devann Yao	Unattached	Ipswich Town	Free
8 February 2010	Paul Heffernan	Doncaster Rovers	Bristol Rovers	Loan
8 February 2010	Matty James	Manchester United	Preston North End	Loan
9 February 2010	Ashley Barnes	Plymouth Argyle	Torquay United	Loan
9 February 2010	Kyle Bartley	Arsenal	Sheffield United	Loan
9 February 2010	Kazenga LuaLua	Newcastle United	Brighton & Hove Albion	Loan
9 February 2010	Dave Martin	Millwall	Derby County	Loan
9 February 2010	Frank Nouble	West Ham United	West Bromwich Albion	Loan
9 February 2010	Kieran Trippier	Manchester City	Barnsley	Loan
11 February 2010	Matt Ritchie	Portsmouth	Swindon Town	Loan
12 February 2010	Tom Heaton	Manchester United	Wycombe Wanderers	Loan
12 February 2010	Danny Ireland	Coventry City	Forest Green Rovers	Loan
12 February 2010	Jonathan Obika	Tottenham Hotspur	Millwall	Loan
12 February 2010	Freddie Sears	West Ham United	Coventry City	Loan
12 February 2010	Duško Tošić	Unattached	Portsmouth	Free
13 February 2010	Chris Iwelumo	Wolverhampton Wanderers	Bristol City	Loan
15 February 2010	Liam Dickinson	Brighton & Hove Albion	Peterborough United	Loan
15 February 2010	Daniel Jones	Wolverhampton Wanderers	Bristol Rovers	Loan
15 February 2010	Julian Kelly	Reading	Wycombe Wanderers	Loan
15 February 2010	Jon Stead	Ipswich Town	Coventry City	Loan
15 February 2010	Elliott Ward	Coventry City	Doncaster Rovers	Loan
15 February 2010	Tom Williams	Peterborough United	Preston North End	Loan
16 February 2010	Matthew Saunders	Fulham	Lincoln City	Loan
18 February 2010	Ross Atkins	Derby County	Kidderminster Harriers	Loan
18 February 2010	Marcus Haber	West Bromwich Albion	Exeter City	Loan
18 February 2010	Luke O'Neill	Leicester City	Tranmere Rovers	Loan
19 February 2010	Ashley Cain	Coventry City	Oxford United	Loan
19 February 2010	Eddie Nolan	Preston North End	Sheffield Wednesday	Loan
19 February 2010	Gilles Sunu	Arsenal	Derby County	Loan
22 February 2010	Ben Watson	Wigan Athletic	West Bromwich Albion	Loan
24 February 2010	Yoann Folly	Plymouth Argyle	Dagenham & Redbridge	Loan
26 February 2010	Mark Oxley	Hull City	Grimsby Town	Loan
26 February 2010	Dan Preston	Birmingham City	Hereford United	Loan
27 February 2010	Jay Emmanuel-Thomas	Arsenal	Doncaster Rovers	Loan
27 February 2010	Jason Steele	Middlesbrough	Northampton Town	Loan
27 February 2010	Josh Walker	Middlesbrough	Rotherham United	Loan
1 March 2010	Adam Boyes	Scunthorpe United	Kidderminster Harriers	Loan
2 March 2010	Diego Arismendi	Stoke City	Brighton & Hove Albion	Loan
2 March 2010	George Boyd	Peterborough United	Nottingham Forest	Loan
2 March 2010	Mark Little	Wolverhampton Wanderers	Peterborough United	Loan
4 March 2010	George Friend	Wolverhampton Wanderers	Exeter City	Loan
4 March 2010	Daniel Nardiello	Blackpool	Oldham Athletic	Loan
5 March 2010	Stephen Elliott	Preston North End	Norwich City	Loan
5 March 2010	Steven Reid	Blackburn Rovers	West Bromwich Albion	Loan
11 March 2010	Stephen Darby	Liverpool	Swindon Town	Loan
11 March 2010	James McCarten	Everton	Accrington Stanley	Loan
11 March 2010	James Vaughan	Everton	Leicester City	Loan
11 March 2010	Gavin Williams	Bristol City	Yeovil Town	Loan
11 March 2010	Ben Wright	Peterborough United	Barnet	Loan
12 March 2010	Abdulai Bell-Baggie	Reading	Rotherham United	Loan
12 March 2010	Kayleden Brown	West Bromwich Albion	Barrow	Loan
12 March 2010	Simon Heslop	Barnsley	Luton Town	Loan
12 March 2010	David Martin	Liverpool	Derby County	Loan
12 March 2010	Chris Stokes	Bolton Wanderers	Crewe Alexandra	Loan
12 March 2010	Ed Upson	Ipswich Town	Barnet	Loan
13 March 2010	Jonathan Lund	Burnley	Barnsley	Loan
15 March 2010	Scott Davies	Reading	Yeovil Town	Loan
15 March 2010	Lewis Guy	Doncaster Rovers	Oldham Athletic	Loan
15 March 2010	Stefan Maierhofer	Wolverhampton Wanderers	Bristol City	Loan
16 March 2010	Paul Connolly	Derby County	Sheffield United	Loan
16 March 2010	Ryan Kendall	Hull City	Bradford City	Loan
16 March 2010	Bondz N'Gala	West Ham United	Plymouth Arglye	Loan
17 March 2010	Luke Ayling	Arsenal	Yeovil Town	Loan
18 March 2010	Gary Borrowdale	Queens Park Rangers	Charlton Athletic	Loan
19 March 2010	Seamus Coleman	Everton	Blackpool	Loan
19 March 2010	Ishmel Demontagnac	Blackpool	Chesterfield	Loan
19 March 2010	Jake Jervis	Birmingham City	Hereford United	Loan
19 March 2010	Frank Nouble	West Ham United	Swindon Town	Loan
19 March 2010	Steve Simonsen	Stoke City	Sheffield United	Loan
19 March 2010	Lewis Young	Watford	Hereford United	Loan
23 March 2010	Neill Collins	Preston North End	Leeds United	Loan
23 March 2010	David Edgar	Burnley	Swansea City	Loan
23 March 2010	Lee Hendrie	Derby County	Brighton & Hove Albion	Loan
23 March 2010	Jimmy McNulty	Brighton & Hove Albion	Scunthorpe United	Loan
23 March 2010	Jay Spearing	Liverpool	Leicester City	Loan
23 March 2010	Elliott Ward	Coventry City	Preston North End	Loan
24 March 2010	Joss Labadie	West Bromwich Albion	Tranmere Rovers	Loan
25 March 2010	Astrit Ajdarević	Leicester City	Hereford United	Loan
25 March 2010	Pim Balkestein	Ipswich Town	Brentford	Loan
25 March 2010	Ashley Barnes	Plymouth Argyle	Brighton & Hove Albion	Loan
25 March 2010	Tomasz Cywka	Wigan Athletic	Derby County	Loan
25 March 2010	Jamie Devitt	Hull City	Grimsby Town	Loan
25 March 2010	Matt Fry	West Ham United	Charlton Athletic	Loan
25 March 2010	Ben Gordon	Chelsea	Tranmere Rovers	Loan
25 March 2010	Arnaud Mendy	Derby County	Rotherham United	Loan
25 March 2010	Jay O'Shea	Birmingham City	Middlesbrough	Loan
25 March 2010	James Poole	Manchester City	Bury	Loan
25 March 2010	Franck Queudrue	Birmingham City	Colchester United	Loan
25 March 2010	Gary Sawyer	Plymouth Argyle	Bristol City	Loan
25 March 2010	John Spicer	Doncaster Rovers	Leyton Orient	Loan
25 March 2010	Duško Tošić	Portsmouth	Queens Park Rangers	Loan
25 March 2010	Sanchez Watt	Arsenal	Leeds United	Loan
8 April 2010	Danny Hoesen	Fulham	HJK Helsinki	Loan
9 April 2010	Marcus Haber	West Bromwich Albion	Vancouver Whitecaps	Loan
16 April 2010	Péter Gulácsi	Liverpool	Tranmere Rovers	Loan
28 April 2010	Márton Fülöp	Sunderland	Manchester City	Loan
28 April 2010^{2}	Jonjo Shelvey	Charlton Athletic	Liverpool	£1.7m
6 May 2010	Steve Collis	Bristol City	Torquay United	Loan
8 May 2010	Darren Moore	Barnsley	Burton Albion	Free
10 May 2010	Paul Hayes	Scunthorpe United	Preston North End	Free
11 May 2010	Cristian Riveros	Cruz Azul	Sunderland	Undisclosed
11 May 2010	Marcus Williams	Scunthorpe United	Reading	Free
12 May 2010	David Martin	Liverpool	Milton Keynes Dons	Free
12 May 2010	Jason Shackell	Wolverhampton Wanderers	Barnsley	Undisclosed
18 May 2010	Jamie Mackie	Plymouth Argyle	Queens Park Rangers	Undisclosed
19 May 2010	James Bailey	Crewe Alexandra	Derby County	Undisclosed
19 May 2010	John Brayford	Crewe Alexandra	Derby County	Undisclosed
19 May 2010	Ben Foster	Manchester United	Birmingham City	Undisclosed
19 May 2010	Lewis Guy	Doncaster Rovers	Milton Keynes Dons	Free
19 May 2010	Gabriel Tamaş	Auxerre	West Bromwich Albion	Undisclosed
21 May 2010	Leon Clarke	Sheffield Wednesday	Queens Park Rangers	Free
21 May 2010	Andrew Crofts	Brighton & Hove Albion	Norwich City	Undisclosed
24 May 2010	Grant McCann	Scunthorpe United	Peterborough United	Free
24 May 2010	Bondz N'Gala	West Ham United	Plymouth Argyle	Free
25 May 2010	Lee Butcher	Tottenham Hotspur	Leyton Orient	Free
25 May 2010	Tomasz Cywka	Wigan Athletic	Derby County	Free
25 May 2010	Mark Little	Wolverhampton Wanderers	Peterborough United	Free
26 May 2010	Steven Reid	Blackburn Rovers	West Bromwich Albion	Free
26 May 2010	Elliott Ward	Coventry City	Norwich City	Free
26 May 2010	Nikola Žigić	Valencia	Birmingham City	£6m
27 May 2010	Nick Carle	Crystal Palace	Sydney FC	Free
27 May 2010	Javier Hernández	Guadalajara	Manchester United	Undisclosed
27 May 2010	Sean McDaid	Leeds United	Carlisle United	Free
27 May 2010	Kasper Schmeichel	Notts County	Leeds United	Free
27 May 2010	Robbie Threlfall	Liverpool	Bradford City	Free
27 May 2010	Peter Winn	Scunthorpe United	Stevenage Borough	Free
28 May 2010	Goran Lovre	Groningen	Barnsley	Free
28 May 2010	Dean Marney	Hull City	Burnley	Undisclosed
31 May 2010	Jermaine Beckford	Unattached	Everton	Free
1 June 2010	Chris Iwelumo	Wolverhampton Wanderers	Burnley	Undisclosed
1 June 2010	Dave Martin	Millwall	Derby County	Undisclosed
1 June 2010	Richard Lee	Watford	Brentford	Free
1 June 2010	Jelle Van Damme	Anderlecht	Wolverhampton Wanderers	Undisclosed
1 June 2010	James Wesolowski	Leicester City	Peterborough United	Undisclosed
2 June 2010	Daniel Bogdanovic	Barnsley	Sheffield United	Free
2 June 2010	Chris Dagnall	Rochdale	Scunthorpe United	Free
2 June 2010	Pablo Ibáñez	Atlético Madrid	West Bromwich Albion	Free
2 June 2010	Elliot Omozusi	Fulham	Leyton Orient	Free
2 June 2010	Emanuel Pogatetz	Middlesbrough	Hannover 96	Free
2 June 2010	Billy Paynter	Swindon Town	Leeds United	Free
2 June 2010	Steven Smith	Rangers	Norwich City	Free
3 June 2010	Steven Fletcher	Burnley	Wolverhampton Wanderers	Undisclosed
3 June 2010	Billy Kee	Leicester City	Torquay United	Free
4 June 2010	David Fox	Colchester United	Norwich City	Undisclosed
4 June 2010	Gary Naysmith	Sheffield United	Huddersfield Town	Free
4 June 2010	Peter Winn	Scunthorpe United	Stevenage Borough	Free
5 June 2010^{1}	Thomas Hitzlsperger	Lazio	West Ham United	Free
7 June 2010	Paddy Kenny	Sheffield United	Queens Park Rangers	£750k
7 June 2010	Chris Sedgwick	Preston North End	Sheffield Wednesday	Free
8 June 2010	Angelo Balanta	Queens Park Rangers	Milton Keynes Dons	Loan
8 June 2010	Philippe Senderos	Arsenal	Fulham	Free
9 June 2010	Johannes Ertl	Crystal Palace	Sheffield United	Free
9 June 2010	Paul Heffernan	Doncaster Rovers	Sheffield Wednesday	Free
9 June 2010	Simon Heslop	Barnsley	Oxford United	Free
9 June 2010	Marcus Marshall	Blackburn Rovers	Rotherham United	Free
9 June 2010	João Silva	Desportivo Aves	Everton	Undisclosed
10 June 2010	Paul Connolly	Derby County	Leeds United	Free
10 June 2010	Alex Henshall	Swindon Town	Manchester City	Undisclosed
10 June 2010	Tom Kennedy	Rochdale	Leicester City	Free
10 June 2010^{1}	Miroslav Stoch	Chelsea	Fenerbahçe	Undisclosed
13 June 2010	Michael Ballack	Chelsea	Bayer Leverkusen	Free
14 June 2010	George Friend	Wolverhampton Wanderers	Doncaster Rovers	Free
14 June 2010	Nathaniel Wedderburn	Stoke City	Northampton Town	Free
15 June 2010	Shaun Batt	Peterborough United	Millwall	Undisclosed
15 June 2010	Paul Marshall	Manchester City	Walsall	Free
16 June 2010	Federico Bessone	Swansea City	Leeds United	Free
16 June 2010	Tamika Mkandawire	Leyton Orient	Millwall	Free
17 June 2010	Ian Bennett	Sheffield United	Huddersfield Town	Free
17 June 2010	Simon Mignolet	Sint-Truiden	Sunderland	Undisclosed
17 June 2010	Stefan Payne	Fulham	Gillingham	Free
17 June 2010	Jason Price	Millwall	Carlisle United	Free
17 June 2010	Andy White	Reading	Gillingham	Free
18 June 2010	Steven Mouyokolo	Hull City	Wolverhampton Wanderers	Undisclosed
21 June 2010	Stephen Hunt	Hull City	Wolverhampton Wanderers	Undisclosed
21 June 2010	Gary McSheffrey	Birmingham City	Coventry City	Free
21 June 2010	Sam Cox	Tottenham Hotspur	Barnet	Free
21 June 2010	Danny Kelly	Norwich	Barnet	Free
22 June 2010	Shaun Derry	Crystal Palace	Queens Park Rangers	Free
22 June 2010	Jack Randall	Crystal Palace	Aldershot Town	Undisclosed
22 June 2010	Jordan Stewart	Sheffield United	Skoda Xanthi	Undisclosed
22 June 2010	Andrew Surman	Wolverhampton Wanderers	Norwich City	Undisclosed
24 June 2010	Liam Trotter	Ipswich Town	Millwall	Free
24 June 2010	Stephen O'Halloran	Aston Villa	Coventry City	Free
25 June 2010	Will Hoskins	Watford	Bristol Rovers	Free
25 June 2010	Roy O'Donovan	Sunderland	Coventry City	Free
28 June 2010	Richard Keogh	Carlisle United	Coventry City	Free
29 June 2010	Mauro Boselli	Estudiantes LP	Wigan Athletic	Undisclosed
29 June 2010	Matt Sparrow	Scunthorpe United	Brighton & Hove Albion	Free
30 June 2010	Luke Ayling	Arsenal	Yeovil Town	Free
30 June 2010	Lee Croft	Derby County	Huddersfield Town	Loan
30 June 2010	Liam Dickinson	Brighton & Hove Albion	Barnsley	Undisclosed
30 June 2010	Neil Taylor	Wrexham	Swansea City	Free
30 June 2010	David Wright	Ipswich Town	Crystal Palace	Free
1 July 2010	Tom Aldred	Unattached	Watford	Free
1 July 2010	Robbie Blake	Burnley	Bolton Wanderers	Free
1 July 2010	Jérôme Boateng	Hamburg	Manchester City	Undisclosed
1 July 2010	Marouane Chamakh	Bordeaux	Arsenal	Free
1 July 2010	Jamie Chandler	Sunderland	Darlington	Free
1 July 2010	Rene Gilmartin	Unattached	Watford	Free
1 July 2010	Andy Griffin	Stoke City	Reading	Undisclosed
1 July 2010	Magaye Gueye	Strasbourg	Everton	Undisclosed
1 July 2010	Andrew Halliday	Livingston	Middlesbrough	Undisclosed
1 July 2010	Tom Heaton	Manchester United	Cardiff City	Free
1 July 2010	Clint Hill	Unattached	Queens Park Rangers	Free
1 July 2010	Radoslaw Majewski	Polonia Warsaw	Nottingham Forest	£1m
1 July 2010	Jamie McCombe	Bristol City	Huddersfield Town	Undisclosed
1 July 2010	Nathaniel Mendez-Laing	Wolverhampton Wanderers	Peterborough United	Loan
1 July 2010	Ján Mucha	Legia Warsaw	Everton	Free
1 July 2010	Martin Petrov	Manchester City	Bolton Wanderers	Free
1 July 2010	Chris Smalling	Fulham	Manchester United	Undisclosed
1 July 2010	Zoran Tošić	Manchester United	CSKA Moscow	Undisclosed
1 July 2010	Enric Vallès	NAC Breda	Birmingham City	Free
1 July 2010	Ron-Robert Zieler	Manchester United	Hannover 96	Free
2 July 2010	Ahmed Al-Muhammadi	ENPPI Club	Sunderland	Loan
2 July 2010	Yossi Benayoun	Liverpool	Chelsea	Undisclosed
2 July 2010	Ben Burgess	Blackpool	Notts County	Free
2 July 2010	Matty James	Manchester United	Preston North End	Loan
2 July 2010	Neil Mellor	Preston North End	Sheffield Wednesday	Loan
2 July 2010	Steve Simonsen	Unattached	Sheffield United	Free
2 July 2010	Gary Teale	Derby County	Sheffield Wednesday	Free
2 July 2010	O'Neil Thompson	Barnsley	Hereford United	Loan
2 July 2010	Yaya Touré	Barcelona	Manchester City	£24m
2 July 2010	Ed Upson	Ipswich Town	Yeovil Town	Free
2 July 2010	Ross Wallace	Preston North End	Burnley	Undisclosed
5 July 2010	Kris Boyd	Unattached	Middlesbrough	Free
5 July 2010	James Perch	Nottingham Forest	Newcastle United	Undisclosed
5 July 2010	John Ruddy	Everton	Norwich City	Undisclosed
6 July 2010	Adam Barrett	Unattached	Crystal Palace	Free
6 July 2010	Wayne Brown	Leicester City	Preston North End	Free
6 July 2010	Michael Collins	Huddersfield Town	Scunthorpe United	Undisclosed
6 July 2010	Andy Dorman	Unattached	Crystal Palace	Free
6 July 2010	Andrew Haworth	Blackburn Rovers	Bury	Free
6 July 2010	Josh Lillis	Scunthorpe United	Rochdale	Loan
6 July 2010	James McEveley	Unattached	Barnsley	Free
6 July 2010	Craig Morgan	Peterborough United	Preston North End	£400k
6 July 2010	Rhys Taylor	Chelsea	Crewe Alexandra	Loan
6 July 2010	Simon Walton	Plymouth Argyle	Sheffield United	Loan
7 July 2010	Neill Collins	Preston North End	Leeds United	Undisclosed
7 July 2010	Tomáš Kalas	Sigma Olomouc	Chelsea	Undisclosed
7 July 2010	Tomáš Kalas	Chelsea	Sigma Olomouc	Loan
7 July 2010	Laurent Koscielny	FC Lorient	Arsenal	Undisclosed
7 July 2010	Eddie Nolan	Preston North End	Scunthorpe United	Loan
7 July 2010	Billy Sharp	Sheffield United	Doncaster Rovers	£1.5m
8 July 2010	Nicky Bailey	Charlton Athletic	Middlesbrough	£1.4m
8 July 2010	Nadir Belhadj	Portsmouth	Al-Sadd	Undisclosed
8 July 2010	Lorik Cana	Sunderland	Galatasaray	£5m
8 July 2010	Florent Cuvelier	Portsmouth	Stoke City	Undisclosed
8 July 2010	Simon Gillett	Unattached	Doncaster Rovers	Free
8 July 2010	Milan Jovanović	Standard Liège	Liverpool	Free
9 July 2010	Kalifa Cissé	Reading	Bristol City	Undisclosed
9 July 2010	Lloyd Sam	Unattached	Leeds United	Free
9 July 2010	Miguel Vítor	Benfica	Leicester City	Loan
10 July 2010	Jure Travner	Watford	St Mirren	Loan
12 July 2010	Diego Arismendi	Stoke City	Barnsley	Loan
12 July 2010	James Harper	Unattached	Hull City	Free
12 July 2010	Rob Kozluk	Unattached	Sheffield United	Free
12 July 2010	Joe Ledley	Cardiff City	Celtic	Free
12 July 2010	Nolberto Solano	Leicester City	Hull City	Free
13 July 2010	David Ball	Manchester City	Swindon Town	Loan
13 July 2010	Stephen McManus	Celtic	Middlesbrough	£1.5m
13 July 2010	Steve Mildenhall	Southend United	Millwall	Free
14 July 2010	Mark Byrne	Nottingham Forest	Barnet	Loan
14 July 2010	Luke Daniels	West Bromwich Albion	Bristol Rovers	Loan
14 July 2010	David Silva	Valencia	Manchester City	£24m
15 July 2010	Tom Elliott	Leeds United	Rotherham United	Loan
16 July 2010	Pablo Barrera	UNAM Pumas	West Ham United	£4m
16 July 2010	David Gray	Unattached	Preston North End	Free
16 July 2010	Conor Hourihane	Sunderland	Ipswich Town	Undisclosed
16 July 2010	Simeon Jackson	Gillingham	Norwich City	Undisclosed
16 July 2010	Daryl Murphy	Sunderland	Celtic	£1.5m
16 July 2010	Frédéric Piquionne	Lyon	West Ham United	Undisclosed
16 July 2010	Kevin Thomson	Rangers	Middlesbrough	£2m
16 July 2010	Ibrahima Sonko	Stoke City	Portsmouth	Loan
21 July 2010	Joe Cole	Unattached	Liverpool	Free
21 July 2010	Francis Coquelin	Arsenal	Lorient	Loan
21 July 2010	Eduardo	Arsenal	Shakhtar Donetsk	£6m
21 July 2010	Joe Garner	Nottingham Forest	Huddersfield Town	Loan
21 July 2010	Gunnar Nielsen	Manchester City	Tranmere Rovers	Loan
21 July 2010	Danny Wilson	Rangers	Liverpool	£2m
22 July 2010	Antolín Alcaraz	Club Brugge	Wigan Athletic	Free
22 July 2010	Dan Gosling	Unattached	Newcastle United	Free
23 July 2010	Andreas Arestidou	Unattached	Preston North End	Free
23 July 2010	Titus Bramble	Wigan Athletic	Sunderland	Undisclosed
23 July 2010	Lee Carsley	Unattached	Coventry City	Free
23 July 2010	John Johnson	Middlesbrough	Northampton Town	Undisclosed
23 July 2010	Albert Riera	Liverpool	Olympiacos	Undisclosed
24 July 2010	Marcos Angeleri	Estudiantes LP	Sunderland	Undisclosed
24 July 2010	Aleksandar Kolarov	Lazio	Manchester City	£16m
26 July 2010	Lukas Jutkiewicz	Everton	Coventry City	Undisclosed
27 July 2010	Marcos Alonso	Real Madrid	Bolton Wanderers	Undisclosed
27 July 2010	Lee Grant	Sheffield Wednesday	Burnley	Undisclosed
27 July 2010	Gary Hooper	Scunthorpe United	Celtic	£2.4m
27 July 2010	Yann Kermorgant	Leicester City	Arles-Avignon	Loan
27 July 2010	John Sullivan	Millwall	Yeovil Town	Loan
28 July 2010	Sol Campbell	Unattached	Newcastle United	Free
28 July 2010	Paul Hartley	Bristol City	Aberdeen	Free
28 July 2010	James Henry	Reading	Millwall	Undisclosed
28 July 2010	Mark Kennedy	Cardiff City	Ipswich Town	£75k
28 July 2010	Rob Kiernan	Watford	Yeovil Town	Loan
28 July 2010	Tarmo Kink	Győri ETO	Middlesbrough	Undisclosed
28 July 2010	Kevin Lisbie	Ipswich Town	Millwall	Loan
28 July 2010	Josh Payne	Unattached	Doncaster Rovers	Free
28 July 2010	Clive Platt	Colchester United	Coventry City	Undisclosed
29 July 2010	Jeronimo Morales Neumann	Estudiantes LP	Barnsley	Free
29 July 2010	Lewis Price	Unattached	Crystal Palace	Free
30 July 2010	Marcus Haber	West Bromwich Albion	St Johnstone	Loan
30 July 2010	Nicky Hunt	Bolton Wanderers	Bristol City	Free
30 July 2010	David James	Unattached	Bristol City	Free
30 July 2010	Boaz Myhill	Hull City	West Bromwich Albion	£1.5m
30 July 2010	Bradley Orr	Bristol City	Queens Park Rangers	Undisclosed
30 July 2010	Damion Stewart	Queens Park Rangers	Bristol City	Undisclosed
30 July 2010	Kamel Ghilas	Hull City	Arles-Avignon	Loan
2 August 2010	Mikkel Andersen	Reading	Bristol Rovers	Loan
2 August 2010	Leon Črnčič	Unattached	Leicester City	Free
2 August 2010	Danny Philliskirk	Chelsea	Oxford United	Loan
3 August 2010	Tal Ben Haim	Portsmouth	West Ham United	Loan
3 August 2010	David Button	Tottenham Hotspur	Plymouth Argyle	Loan
3 August 2010	James Chester	Manchester United	Carlisle United	Loan
3 August 2010	Owen Garvan	Ipswich Town	Crystal Palace	Undisclosed
3 August 2010	Tom Lees	Leeds United	Bury	Loan
3 August 2010	Sanchez Watt	Arsenal	Leeds United	Loan
4 August 2010	Darren Carter	Preston North End	Millwall	Loan
4 August 2010	Ivan Klasnić	Unattached	Bolton Wanderers	Free
4 August 2010	Alan Martin	Leeds United	Barrow	Loan
4 August 2010	Darel Russell	Unattached	Preston North End	Free
5 August 2010	Gary Alexander	Millwall	Brentford	Undisclosed
5 August 2010	Ryan Bertrand	Chelsea	Nottingham Forest	Loan
5 August 2010	Liam Darville	Leeds United	Tranmere Rovers	Loan
5 August 2010	Matt Fry	West Ham United	Charlton Athletic	Loan
5 August 2010	Márton Fülöp	Sunderland	Ipswich Town	Undisclosed
5 August 2010	Ben Gordon	Chelsea	Kilmarnock	Loan
5 August 2010	Oscar Jansson	Tottenham Hotspur	Northampton Town	Loan
5 August 2010	Jake Jervis	Birmingham City	Notts County	Loan
5 August 2010	Jean-Yves Mvoto	Sunderland	Oldham Athletic	Loan
5 August 2010	Dave Mooney	Reading	Colchester United	Loan
5 August 2010	Adel Taarabt	Tottenham Hotspur	Queens Park Rangers	Undisclosed
5 August 2010	Oumare Tounkara	Sunderland	Oldham Athletic	Loan
5 August 2010	Sam Vokes	Wolverhampton Wanderers	Bristol City	Loan
6 August 2010	Pim Balkestein	Ipswich Town	Brentford	Undisclosed
6 August 2010	Julian Bennett	Nottingham Forest	Crystal Palace	Loan
6 August 2010	John Bostock	Tottenham Hotspur	Hull City	Loan
6 August 2010	Adam Clayton	Manchester City	Leeds United	Loan
6 August 2010	Troy Deeney	Walsall	Watford	£500k
6 August 2010	Mame Biram Diouf	Manchester United	Blackburn Rovers	Loan
6 August 2010	Sean Jeffers	Coventry City	Cheltenham Town	Loan
6 August 2010	John Mensah	Lyon	Sunderland	Loan
6 August 2010	Moreno	Vitória Guimarães	Leicester City	Undisclosed
7 August 2010	Conor Doyle	Unattached	Derby County	Free
7 August 2010	Joshua King	Manchester United	Preston North End	Loan
7 August 2010	Jason Koumas	Wigan Athletic	Cardiff City	Loan
7 August 2010	Robin Shroot	Birmingham City	Cheltenham Town	Loan
7 August 2010	Kieran Trippier	Manchester City	Barnsley	Loan
9 August 2010	Stephen Elliott	Preston North End	Hearts	Free
9 August 2010	Stephen Jordan	Unattached	Sheffield United	Free
9 August 2010	Nicky Shorey	Aston Villa	West Bromwich Albion	Undisclosed
9 August 2010	Scott Sinclair	Chelsea	Swansea City	£500k
9 August 2010	Andrew Tutte	Manchester City	Rochdale	Loan
10 August 2010	Colin Doyle	Birmingham City	Coventry City	Loan
10 August 2010	Kyle Bartley	Arsenal	Sheffield United	Loan
10 August 2010	Seyi Olofinjana	Hull City	Cardiff City	Loan
11 August 2010	Craig Cathcart	Manchester United	Blackpool	Undisclosed
11 August 2010	Elliot Grandin	CSKA Sofia	Blackpool	Undisclosed
11 August 2010	Marlon Harewood	Unattached	Blackpool	Free
11 August 2010	Martin John	Unattached	Cardiff City	Free
11 August 2010	Kenwyne Jones	Sunderland	Stoke City	£8m
11 August 2010	Malaury Martin	Unattached	Blackpool	Free
11 August 2010	John Mensah	Olympique Lyonnais	Sunderland	Loan
11 August 2010	Nedum Onuoha	Manchester City	Sunderland	Loan
11 August 2010	Ludovic Sylvestre	Mladá Boleslav	Blackpool	Undisclosed
12 August 2010	Kayleden Brown	West Bromwich Albion	Tranmere Rovers	Loan
12 August 2010	Ricardo Carvalho	Chelsea	Real Madrid	£6.7m
12 August 2010	Jack Cork	Chelsea	Burnley	Loan
12 August 2010	Tom Eaves	Oldham Athletic	Bolton Wanderers	Undisclosed
12 August 2010	Patrick Hoban	Mervue	Bristol City	Undisclosed
12 August 2010	Jimmy Keohane	Wessex United	Bristol City	Undisclosed
12 August 2010	Alex McCarthy	Reading	Brentford	Loan
12 August 2010	Trent McClenahan	Unattached	Scunthorpe United	Free
12 August 2010	Christian Poulsen	Juventus	Liverpool	£4.5m
12 August 2010	Andros Townsend	Tottenham Hotspur	Ipswich Town	Loan
12 August 2010	Danny Welbeck	Manchester United	Sunderland	Loan
13 August 2010	Mario Balotelli	Internazionale	Manchester City	Undisclosed
13 August 2010	Chris Basham	Bolton Wanderers	Blackpool	Undisclosed
13 August 2010	James Beattie	Stoke City	Rangers	Undisclosed
13 August 2010	Abdulai Bell-Baggie	Reading	Port Vale	Loan
13 August 2010	Carl Dickinson	Stoke City	Portsmouth	Loan
13 August 2010	Robert Koren	Unattached	Hull City	Free
13 August 2010	Ryan Mason	Tottenham Hotspur	Doncaster Rovers	Loan
13 August 2010	Franck Moussa	Southend United	Leicester City	Free
13 August 2010	Jamie Proctor	Preston North End	Stockport County	Loan
13 August 2010	Ramires	Benfica	Chelsea	Undisclosed
16 August 2010	Matt Derbyshire	Olympiacos	Birmingham City	Loan
17 August 2010	Craig Bellamy	Manchester City	Cardiff City	Loan
17 August 2010	Jake Cassidy	Airbus UK Broughton	Wolverhampton Wanderers	Undisclosed
17 August 2010	Brad Jones	Middlesbrough	Liverpool	£2.3m
18 August 2010	Daniel Cousin	Hull City	AEL	Undisclosed
18 August 2010	Kevin-Prince Boateng	Portsmouth	Genoa	Undisclosed
18 August 2010	Mousa Dembélé	AZ Alkmaar	Fulham	Undisclosed
18 August 2010	Stephen Ireland	Manchester City	Aston Villa	Undisclosed
18 August 2010	Dekel Keinan	Maccabi Haifa	Blackpool	Free
18 August 2010	James Milner	Aston Villa	Manchester City	Undisclosed
18 August 2010	Darren O'Dea	Celtic	Ipswich Town	Loan
18 August 2010	Stuart O'Keefe	Southend United	Crystal Palace	Free
18 August 2010	Jon Walters	Ipswich Town	Stoke City	£2.75m
19 August 2010	Nicky Adams	Leicester City	Brentford	Undisclosed
19 August 2010	Wes Foderingham	Unattached	Crystal Palace	Free
19 August 2010	Matthew Kilgallon	Sunderland	Middlesbrough	Loan
19 August 2010	Krisztián Németh	Liverpool	Olympiacos	Undisclosed
19 August 2010	Ivelin Popov	Litex Lovech	Blackburn Rovers	Undisclosed
19 August 2010	Reuben Reid	West Bromwich Albion	Walsall	Loan
19 August 2010	Jay Simpson	Arsenal	Hull City	Undisclosed
19 August 2010	Vladimír Weiss	Manchester City	Rangers	Loan
20 August 2010	Pablo Couñago	Ipswich Town	Crystal Palace	Loan
20 August 2010	Edgar Davids	Unattached	Crystal Palace	Free
20 August 2010	Luke Hubbins	Birmingham City	Notts County	Loan
20 August 2010	Lee Naylor	Unattached	Cardiff City	Free
20 August 2010	Jonathan Obika	Tottenham Hotspur	Crystal Palace	Loan
20 August 2010	Peter Odemwingie	Lokomotiv Moscow	West Bromwich Albion	Undisclosed
20 August 2010	Grzegorz Rasiak	Reading	AEL Limassol	Free
20 August 2010	Somen Tchoyi	Red Bull Salzburg	West Bromwich Albion	Undisclosed
20 August 2010	Josh Walker	Middlesbrough	Watford	Free
21 August 2010	Alberto Aquilani	Liverpool	Juventus	Loan
21 August 2010	Alex Marrow	Blackburn Rovers	Crystal Palace	Loan
22 August 2010	William Gallas	Unattached	Tottenham Hotspur	Free
23 August 2010	Steven Caldwell	Unattached	Wigan Athletic	Free
23 August 2010	Mido	Middlesbrough	Ajax	Free
23 August 2010	Brett Pitman	Bournemouth	Bristol City	Undisclosed
23 August 2010	Jason Scotland	Wigan Athletic	Ipswich Town	Undisclosed
23 August 2010	Jon Stead	Ipswich Town	Bristol City	Undisclosed
24 August 2010	Jean Calvé	Nancy	Sheffield United	Loan
24 August 2010	Alessandro Diamanti	West Ham United	Brescia	£1.8m
24 August 2010	Fraser Forster	Newcastle United	Celtic	Loan
24 August 2010	Rafik Halliche	Benfica	Fulham	Undisclosed
24 August 2010	Nemanja Matić	Chelsea	Vitesse	Loan
25 August 2010	Andy Keogh	Wolverhampton Wanderers	Cardiff City	Loan
25 August 2010	Alan Lee	Crystal Palace	Huddersfield Town	Undisclosed
26 August 2010	Yuki Abe	Urawa Red Diamonds	Leicester City	Undisclosed
26 August 2010	Leon Barnett	West Bromwich Albion	Norwich City	Loan
26 August 2010	Harry Forrester	Aston Villa	Kilmarnock	Loan
26 August 2010	Carl Ikeme	Wolverhampton Wanderers	Leicester City	Loan
26 August 2010	Michael Mancienne	Chelsea	Wolverhampton Wanderers	Loan
26 August 2010	Sébastien Squillaci	Sevilla	Arsenal	Undisclosed
27 August 2010	Javier Mascherano	Liverpool	Barcelona	£18.9m
27 August 2010	John Akinde	Bristol City	Bristol Rovers	Loan
27 August 2010	Darryl Flahavan	Unattached	Portsmouth	Free
27 August 2010	Marc-Antoine Fortuné	Celtic	West Bromwich Albion	Undisclosed
27 August 2010	Shaun MacDonald	Swansea City	Yeovil Town	Loan
27 August 2010	Ross McCormack	Cardiff City	Leeds United	Undisclosed
27 August 2010	Benjani Mwaruwari	Unattached	Blackburn	Free
27 August 2010	Victor Obinna	Internazionale	West Ham United	Loan
27 August 2010	Alessandro Pellicori	Queens Park Rangers	Torino	Loan
27 August 2010	Carlos Salcido	PSV Eindhoven	Fulham	Undisclosed
27 August 2010	Mickaël Tavares	Hamburg	Middlesbrough	Loan
27 August 2010	Owain Tudur Jones	Norwich City	Yeovil Town	Loan
27 August 2010	Cheick Tioté	Twente	Newcastle United	Undisclosed
27 August 2010	Luke Varney	Derby County	Blackpool	Loan
27 August 2010	Aman Verma	Leicester City	Kidderminster Harriers	Loan
28 August 2010	Hatem Ben Arfa	Marseille	Newcastle United	Loan
28 August 2010	Raul Meireles	Porto	Liverpool	£11.5m
30 August 2010	Fabio Daprelà	West Ham United	Brescia	Undisclosed
30 August 2010	Paul Scharner	Unattached	West Bromwich Albion	Free
31 August 2010	Yuki Abe	Urawa Red Diamonds	Leicester City	Undisclosed
31 August 2010	Nacer Barazite	Arsenal	Vitesse	Loan
31 August 2010	Jean Beausejour	Club América	Birmingham City	Undisclosed
31 August 2010	Marcus Bent	Birmingham City	Wolverhampton Wanderers	Loan
31 August 2010	Alberto Bueno	Real Valladolid	Derby County	Loan
31 August 2010	Felipe Caicedo	Manchester City	Levante	Loan
31 August 2010	D. J. Campbell	Leicester City	Blackpool	Undisclosed
31 August 2010	David Carney	Twente	Blackpool	Undisclosed
31 August 2010	Adam Clayton	Manchester City	Leeds United	Undisclosed
31 August 2010	Tom Cleverley	Manchester United	Wigan Athletic	Loan
31 August 2010	Lauri Dalla Valle	Liverpool	Fulham	Undisclosed^{3}
31 August 2010	Craig Dawson	Rochdale	West Bromwich Albion	Undisclosed
31 August 2010	Craig Dawson	West Bromwich Albion	Rochdale	Loan
31 August 2010	Matej Delač	Inter Zaprešić	Chelsea	Undisclosed
31 August 2010	Matej Delač	Chelsea	Vitesse	Loan
31 August 2010	Franco Di Santo	Chelsea	Wigan Athletic	Undisclosed
31 August 2010	Salif Diao	Unattached	Stoke City	Free
31 August 2010	Nabil El Zhar	Liverpool	PAOK	Loan
31 August 2010	Anthony Gardner	Hull City	Crystal Palace	Loan
31 August 2010	Anthony Gerrard	Cardiff City	Hull City	Loan
31 August 2010	Jermaine Grandison	Coventry City	Tranmere Rovers	Loan
31 August 2010	Jonathan Grounds	Middlesbrough	Hibernian	Loan
31 August 2010	Eiður Guðjohnsen	AS Monaco	Stoke City	Loan
31 August 2010	Asamoah Gyan	Rennes	Sunderland	£13m
31 August 2010	Ben Hamer	Reading	Brentford	Loan
31 August 2010	Ian Harte	Carlisle United	Reading	Undisclosed
31 August 2010	Alexander Hleb	Barcelona	Birmingham City	Loan
31 August 2010	Rob Hulse	Derby County	Queens Park Rangers	Undisclosed
31 August 2010	Emiliano Insúa	Liverpool	Galatasaray	Loan
31 August 2010	Lars Jacobsen	Blackburn Rovers	West Ham United	Undisclosed
31 August 2010	Martin Jiránek	Spartak Moscow	Birmingham City	Undisclosed
31 August 2010	Alan Judge	Blackburn Rovers	Notts County	Loan
31 August 2010	Alex Kacaniklic	Liverpool	Fulham	Undisclosed^{3}
31 August 2010	Dave Kitson	Stoke City	Portsmouth	Undisclosed
31 August 2010	Paul Konchesky	Fulham	Liverpool	Undisclosed^{3}
31 August 2010	Zurab Khizanishvili	Blackburn Rovers	Reading	Loan
31 August 2010	Liam Lawrence	Stoke City	Portsmouth	Undisclosed
31 August 2010	Kazenga LuaLua	Newcastle United	Brighton & Hove Albion	Loan
31 August 2010	Ben Marshall	Stoke City	Carlisle United	Loan
31 August 2010	Arnaud Mendy	Derby County	Tranmere Rovers	Loan
31 August 2010	Ľubomír Michalík	Leeds United	Carlisle United	Loan
31 August 2010	Mido	Middlesbrough	Ajax	Loan
31 August 2010	Ramón Núñez	Unattached	Leeds United	Free
31 August 2010	Marlon Pack	Portsmouth	Cheltenham Town	Loan
31 August 2010	Josh Payne	Doncaster Rovers	Oxford United	Loan
31 August 2010	Jermaine Pennant	Real Zaragoza	Stoke City	Loan
31 August 2010	Matt Phillips	Wycombe Wanderers	Blackpool	£325k
31 August 2010	Damien Plessis	Liverpool	Panathinaikos	Undisclosed
31 August 2010	Stipe Pletikosa	Spartak Moscow	Tottenham Hotspur	Loan
31 August 2010	Maceo Rigters	Blackburn Rovers	Willem II	Loan
31 August 2010	Robinho	Manchester City	Milan	Undisclosed
31 August 2010	Rodrigo	Benfica	Bolton Wanderers	Loan
31 August 2010	Scott Severin	Watford	Dundee United	Free
31 August 2010	Alan Sheehan	Leeds United	Swindon Town	Free
31 August 2010	Gylfi Sigurðsson	Reading	1899 Hoffenheim	£6m
31 August 2010	Tommy Smith	Portsmouth	Queens Park Rangers	£1.5m
31 August 2010	Andrew Taylor	Middlesbrough	Watford	Loan
31 August 2010	Armand Traoré	Arsenal	Juventus	Loan
31 August 2010	Rafael van der Vaart	Real Madrid	Tottenham Hotspur	£8m
31 August 2010	Martyn Waghorn	Sunderland	Leicester City	£3m
31 August 2010	Vincent Weijl	Liverpool	Eibar	Undisclosed
31 August 2010	Marc Wilson	Portsmouth	Stoke City	Undisclosed
31 August 2010	Joseph Yobo	Everton	Fenerbahçe	Loan

^{1} Player will move when his contract expires on 1 July.
^{2} Move officially went through on 10 May.
^{3} Lauri Dalla Valle and Alex Kacaniklic were part of a player swap for Paul Konchesky.
