= 2009–10 Hull City A.F.C. season =

English football club season

Hull City
2009–10 season
- Chairman: Adam Pearson
- Manager: Phil Brown (until 15 March 2010); Iain Dowie
- Stadium: KC Stadium
- Premier League: 19th (relegated)
- FA Cup: Third round
- League Cup: Third round
- Top goalscorer: League: Stephen Hunt (6); All: Stephen Hunt (6)
- Highest home attendance: 25,030 (9 May vs Liverpool)
- Lowest home attendance: 22,833 (3 October vs Wigan Athletic)
- Average home league attendance: 24,390
Home colours	Away colours

The 2009–10 season of Hull City is the club's second season in the Premier League. Home games were played at the KC Stadium, which has a capacity of 25,404. City had finished the 2008–09 season in 17th place in the table, successfully avoiding relegation by a margin of one point over Newcastle.

== Players ==
=== Current squad ===
Updated 9 May 2010.

Note: Flags indicate national team as defined under FIFA eligibility rules; some limited exceptions apply. Players may hold more than one non-FIFA nationality.

No.	Pos.	Nation	Player
1	GK	WAL	Boaz Myhill
3	DF	ENG	Andy Dawson
4	MF	ENG	Ian Ashbee (captain)
5	DF	ENG	Anthony Gardner
6	DF	IRL	Paul McShane
7	FW	ENG	Craig Fagan
8	MF	ENG	Nick Barmby
9	FW	USA	Jozy Altidore (on loan from Villarreal CF)
10	MF	BRA	Geovanni
11	MF	IRL	Stephen Hunt
12	GK	ENG	Matt Duke
13	FW	ENG	Mark Cullen
14	MF	AUS	Richard Garcia
15	DF	FRA	Bernard Mendy
16	MF	HUN	Péter Halmosi
17	MF	IRL	Kevin Kilbane
18	FW	IRL	Caleb Folan

No.	Pos.	Nation	Player
19	DF	FRA	Steven Mouyokolo
20	MF	NED	George Boateng
21	MF	ENG	Jimmy Bullard
22	MF	ENG	Dean Marney
23	MF	ALG	Kamel Ghilas
24	DF	GUI	Kamil Zayatte
25	FW	GAB	Daniel Cousin
27	FW	ENG	Nicky Featherstone
28	DF	SEN	Ibrahima Sonko (on loan from Stoke City)
29	FW	NED	Jan Vennegoor of Hesselink
31	MF	ENG	Will Atkinson
34	GK	ENG	Mark Oxley
35	DF	SCO	Liam Cooper
36	MF	IRL	Jamie Devitt
39	DF	ENG	Steve Gardner
44	MF	NGR	Seyi Olofinjana
45	MF	SCO	Tom Cairney

=== Squad statistics ===
Updated 14 May 2010.

No.	Pos.	Name	League		FA Cup		League Cup		Total		Discipline	
No.	Pos.	Name	Apps	Goals	Apps	Goals	Apps	Goals	Apps	Goals	Yellow card	Red card
1	GK	Boaz Myhill	27	0	1	0	0	0	28	0	2	0
2	MF	Nathan Doyle	0	0	0	0	1	0	1	0	1	0
3	DF	Andy Dawson	35	1	0	0	0	0	35	1	7	0
4	MF	Ian Ashbee	0	0	0	0	0	0	0	0	0	0
5	DF	Anthony Gardner	24	0	0	0	0	0	24	0	1	0
6	DF	Michael Turner	4	0	0	0	0	0	4	0	1	0
6	DF	Paul McShane	26 (1)	0	0	0	0 (1)	0	26 (2)	0	5	0
7	FW	Craig Fagan	20 (5)	2	0	0	1	0	21 (5)	2	7	1
8	MF	Nick Barmby	6 (14)	0	0	0	2	0	8 (14)	0	4	0
9	FW	Jozy Altidore	16 (12)	1	0 (1)	0	1	1	17 (13)	2	4	1
10	MF	Geovanni	16 (10)	3	1	1	0 (1)	1	17 (11)	5	4	1
11	MF	Stephen Hunt	27	6	0	0	0	0	27	6	4	0
12	GK	Matt Duke	11	0	0	0	1	0	12	0	1	0
13	FW	Mark Cullen	2 (1)	1	0 (1)	0	0	0	2 (2)	1	1	0
14	MF	Richard Garcia	14 (4)	0	1	0	0	0	15 (4)	0	1	0
15	DF	Bernard Mendy	15 (6)	0	1	0	1	0	17 (6)	0	6	1
16	MF	Péter Halmosi	0	0	1	0	2	0	3	0	0	0
17	MF	Kevin Kilbane	15 (6)	1	1	0	0 (2)	0	16 (8)	1	3	0
18	FW	Caleb Folan	7 (1)	2	0	0	0	0	7 (1)	2	1	0
19	DF	Steven Mouyokolo	19 (2)	1	1	0	1	0	21 (2)	1	1	0
20	MF	George Boateng	26 (3)	1	0 (1)	0	1	0	27 (4)	1	4	2
21	MF	Jimmy Bullard	13 (1)	5	0	0	0	0	13 (1)	5	0	0
22	MF	Dean Marney	15 (1)	1	0	0	0 (1)	0	15 (2)	1	4	0
23	MF	Kamel Ghilas	6 (7)	1	1	0	1 (1)	0	8 (8)	1	0	0
24	DF	Kamil Zayatte	21 (2)	2	1	0	1	0	23 (2)	2	4	0
25	FW	Daniel Cousin	1 (2)	0	0	0	0	0	1 (2)	0	0	0
26	GK	Tony Warner	0	0	0	0	1	0	1	0	0	0
27	FW	Nicky Featherstone	0	0	0	0	2	0	2	0	0	0
28	DF	Ibrahima Sonko	9	0	0	0	0	0	9	0	0	0
29	FW	Jan Vennegoor of Hesselink	17 (14)	3	1	1	0	0	19 (14)	3	0	0
30	FW	Amr Zaki	2 (4)	0	0	0	0	0	2 (4)	0	0	0
31	MF	Will Atkinson	2	1	0	0	1	0	3	1	2	0
34	GK	Mark Oxley	0	0	0	0	0	0	0	0	0	0
35	DF	Liam Cooper	1 (1)	0	0	0	2	0	3 (1)	0	0	0
36	MF	Jamie Devitt	0	0	0	0	0	0	0	0	0	0
39	DF	Steve Gardner	0	0	0	0	0	0	0	0	0	0
40	FW	Ryan Kendall	0	0	0	0	0	0	0	0	0	0
41	MF	John Leonard	0	0	0	0	0	0	0	0	0	0
42	DF	Nathan Hanley	0	0	0	0	0	0	0	0	0	0
43	FW	Yann Ekra	0	0	0	0	0	0	0	0	0	0
44	MF	Seyi Olofinjana	11 (8)	1	0	0	0	0	11 (8)	1	3	0
45	MF	Tom Cairney	10 (1)	1	1	0	2	1	13 (1)	2	2	0
–	MF	Bryan Hughes	0	0	0	0	0	0	0	0	0	0

All statistics below are correct as of 31 August 2009 and only Premier League games are included in the list below.

- Top goal scorer: Stephen Hunt, 2
- Most assists: Jozy Altidore, 1
- Most Shots on target: Geovanni, 5
- Most Red Cards: None yet, 0
- Most Yellow Cards: Stephen Hunt, 2
- Most fouls: Stephen Hunt, 9

=== Starting 11 ===
Considering starts in all competitions
Considering a 4-4-2 formation

No.	Pos.	Nat.	Name	MS	Notes
1	GK	(Wales)	Boaz Myhill	28	
6	RB	(Republic of Ireland)	Paul McShane	26	Bernard Mendy has 17 starts
5	CB	(England)	Anthony Gardner	24	
24	CB	(Guinea)	Kamil Zayatte	23	Steven Mouyokolo has 21 starts
3	LB	(England)	Andy Dawson	35	
7	RM	(England)	Craig Fagan	21	Geovanni has 17 starts
22	CM	(England)	Dean Marney	15	Richard Garcia has 15 starts
20	CM	(Netherlands)	George Boateng	27	
11	LM	(Republic of Ireland)	Stephen Hunt	27	Kevin Kilbane has 16 starts
29	CF	(Netherlands)	Jan Vennegoor of Hesselink	19	
9	CF	(United States)	Jozy Altidore	21	

=== Transfers ===
In

Date	Pos	Name	From	Fee	Notes
2 June 2009	DF	Steven Mouyokolo	Boulogne	£1.8 million	
6 August 2009	MF	Seyi Olofinjana	Stoke City	£3 million	
13 August 2009	MF	Kamel Ghilas	Celta Vigo	£2 million	
13 August 2009	MF	Stephen Hunt	Reading	Undisclosed	
26 August 2009	DF	Paul McShane	Sunderland	£1.5 million	Also included in Michael Turner transfer
3 September 2009	FW	Jan Vennegoor of Hesselink	Unattached	Free	

Out

Date	Pos	Name	To	Fee	Notes
25 July 2009	DF	Sam Ricketts	Bolton Wanderers	Undisclosed	
31 August 2009	DF	Michael Turner	Sunderland	Undisclosed	Also included in Paul McShane transfer
13 January 2010	DF	Nathan Doyle	Barnsley	Free	
29 January 2010	MF	Bryan Hughes		Released	
1 February 2010	GK	Tony Warner		Released	
17 May 2010	DF	Bernard Mendy		Released	
28 May 2010	FW	Yann Ekra		Released	
28 May 2010	DF	Nathan Hanley		Released	
28 May 2010	FW	Ryan Kendall		Released	
28 May 2010	MF	John Leonard		Released	
28 May 2010	MF	Dean Marney	Burnley	Undisclosed	
20 June 2010	DF	Steven Mouyokolo	Wolverhampton Wanderers	Undisclosed	
21 June 2010	MF	Stephen Hunt	Wolverhampton Wanderers	Undisclosed	

=== Loans ===
In

Date	Pos	Name	From	End date	Notes
10 August 2009	FW	Jozy Altidore	Villarreal	30 June 2010	
1 September 2009	DF	Ibrahima Sonko	Stoke City	30 June 2010	
17 January 2010	FW	Amr Zaki	Zamalek SC	17 April 2010	

Out

Date	Pos	Name	To	End date	Notes
15 September 2009	MF	Jamie Devitt	Darlington	15 October 2009	
17 September 2009	FW	Caleb Folan	Middlesbrough	17 December 2009	
18 September 2009	DF	Nathan Doyle	Barnsley	18 December 2009	
22 October 2009	MF	Jamie Devitt	Shrewsbury Town	January 2010	
22 October 2009	MF	Bryan Hughes	Derby County	22 November 2009	
23 October 2009	GK	Mark Oxley	Walsall	December 2009	
21 November 2009	MF	Will Atkinson	Rochdale	21 January 2010	
23 November 2009	MF	Nicky Featherstone	Grimsby Town	4 January 2010	
10 January 2010	MF	Nicky Featherstone	Grimsby Town	2 February 2010	
1 February 2010	MF	Péter Halmosi	Szombathelyi Haladás	30 June 2010	
1 February 2010	FW	Daniel Cousin	AEL	30 June 2010	
1 February 2010	MF	Will Atkinson	Rochdale	31 March 2010	
17 February 2010	MF	Jamie Devitt	Grimsby Town	30 June 2010	
26 February 2010	GK	Mark Oxley	Grimsby Town	22 March 2010	
16 March 2010	FW	Ryan Kendall	Bradford City	16 April 2010	
2 April 2010	GK	Mark Oxley	Grimsby Town	9 April 2010	

== Awards ==
Stephen Hunt was named as player of the year and also took the first Tigers Player trophy. George Boateng came second and Andy Dawson came third. Andy Dawson was awarded players' player of the year, with Mark Cullen taking the Young Player of the Year award.

Tom Cairney's goal against Everton in March being voted goal of the season.

== Non-playing staff ==
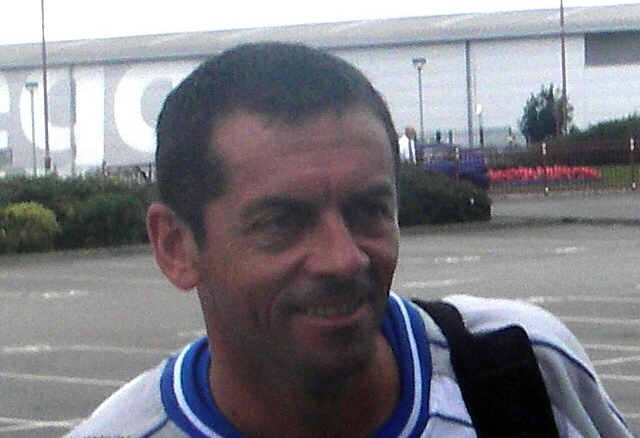
Phil Brown, former manager of Hull City 2006–10

Updated 7 June 2010.

- Manager: Iain Dowie
- Assistant Manager: Tim Flowers
- First Team Coach: Steve Parkin
- First Team Coach: Steve Wigley
- Goalkeeping Coach: Mark Prudhoe
- Reserve Team Coach: Aidan Davison
- Development Coach: Stuart Watkiss
- Head of Youth: Billy Russell
- Fitness Coordinator: Sean Rush
- Sports Psychologist: Mark Nesti
- ProZone Consultant/Performance Analyst: Laurence Stewart
- Chief Scout: Bob Shaw
- Youth Recruitment Officer: Neil Mann
- Football in the Community Officer: John Davies
- Enterprise Co-Ordinator: Andy McMillan
- Head Physiotherapist: Simon Maltby
- Assistant Physiotherapist: Liam McGarry
- Kit Manager: Barry Lowe
- Club Secretary: Phil Hough

== Kits ==
For the 2009–10 season Hull used the most common black and amber stripes as their home kit. They used a blue coloured shirt as their away shirt. The goalkeeper kit was green. Hull's kit was produced by Umbro and all the shirts had totesport.com printed on the front as the sponsor.

Hull's Home kit for 2009–10.	Hull's Away Kit for 2009–10	Hull's Goalkeeper Kit for 2009–10

== Preseason ==
=== Preseason training ===
Hull's preseason training took the tigers back to Bormio, Italy once more this time just for five days. Boaz Myhill spoke out saying it was hard work but essential. Injured Ian Ashbee was present in Bormio after he had a knee brace fitted and he was working to "Get the strength back in his leg". On day five in Bormio the tigers training include a 16 km bike ride. On the final day the team took part in a bike ride and further training along with massages with light training.

Winger Jerome Thomas joined Hull in part of their preseason training on a 10-day trial however he was not signed. On Hull's trip to China to play in the Barclays Beijing Asia Trophy and they trained at the Workers Stadium.

=== Preseason friendlies ===
Date	Opponents	H / A	Result	Scorers	Attendance	Notes
18 July	North Ferriby United	A	0–6	Thomas (33), Devitt (53), Featherstone (70), Folan (74) & (81), Barmby (80)
19 July	Winterton Rangers	A	0–3	Cairney, Boateng, Marney
21 July	Carlisle United	A	1–2	Robson (12), Cousin (46), Halmosi (73)	2,156
25 July	Sheffield Wednesday	A	0–0		5,230
5 August	Bridlington Town	A	1–4	Featherstone (20), Kendall (46), (57), (62), Rhodes (60)
9 August	Aberdeen	H	0–1	Lee Miller (38)	8,272	(Note: Dean Windass benefit match.)

== Barclays Asia Trophy ==
On 10 June 2009, Hull City were officially announced as part of the Barclays Asia Trophy 2009. In this 4-team tournament Hull City competed against two English sides, Tottenham Hotspur and West Ham United, as well local side Beijing Guoan, who they beat 5–4 on a penalty shoot out after a 1–1 draw. On 31 July 2009, Hull City faced Tottenham Hotspur in the final of the Barclays Asia Trophy and were defeated 3–0.

Date	Opponents	Result	Scorers	Attendance	Notes
29 July	Beijing Guoan	1–1 (5–4 penalties)	Geovanni (9), Paul (47); Devitt, Wei, Dawson, Ting, Cousin, Bowen, Hughes, Hui, Folan	15,000
31 July	Tottenham Hotspur	3–0	Keane (16), (68) pen, Lennon (88)	10,056

== Premier League ==
Hull's second season in the top tier of English Football in their 105-year history.

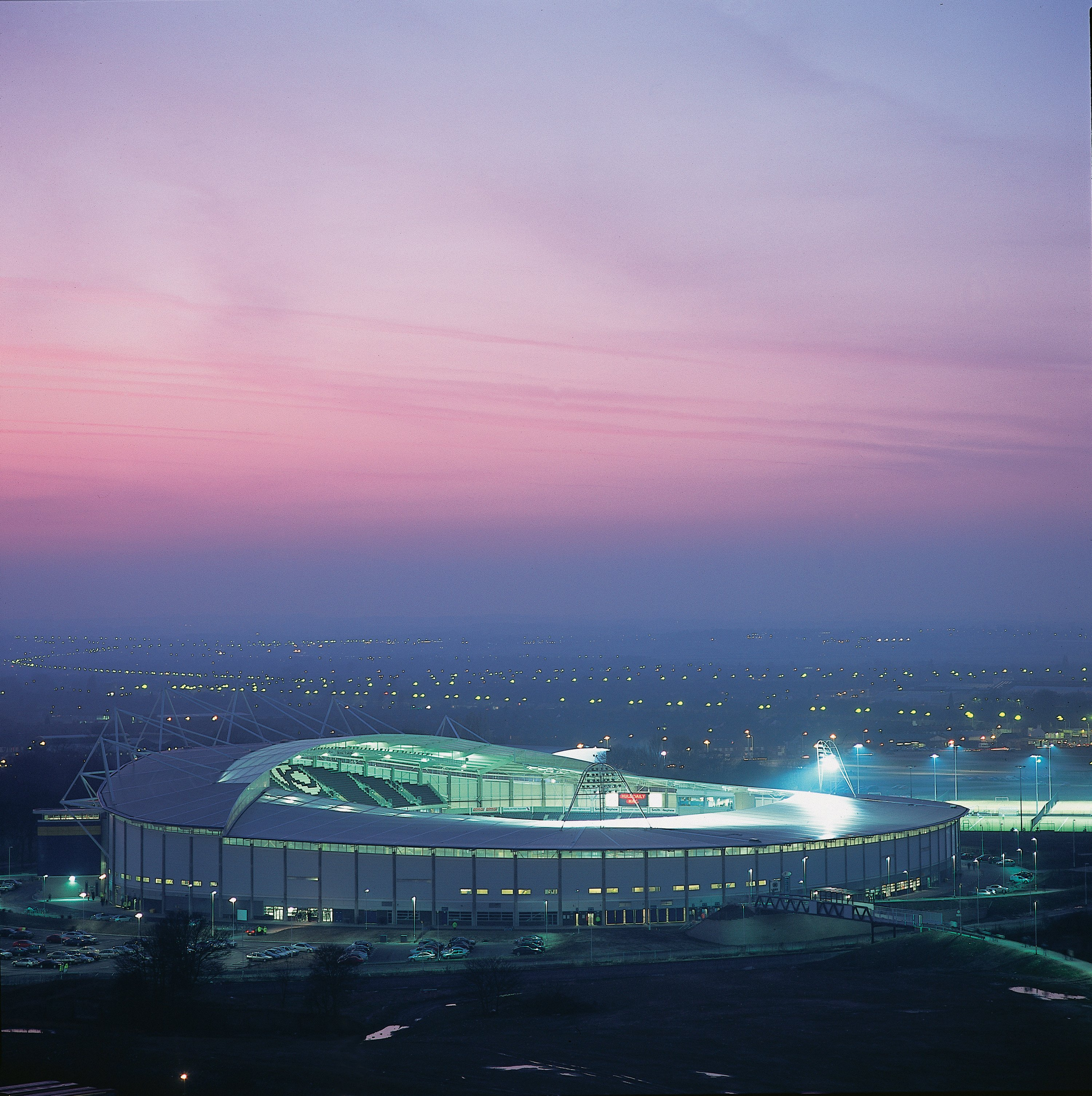
KC Stadium where Hull play their Premier League home games

=== August–December ===
On 29 October 2009 chairman Paul Duffen resigned his position with the club and was replaced by former chairman Adam Pearson on 2 November 2009.

=== January–June ===
On 15 March 2010 manager Phil Brown was relieved of his duties after a run of four defeats left Hull in the relegation zone. On 17 March 2010 Brown's replacement was named as former Crystal Palace and Charlton Athletic boss, Iain Dowie. Dowie's first move as manager was to bring Tim Flowers and Steve Wigley onto his backroom staff, with former Hull City assistant manager Brian Horton joining Phil Brown on gardening leave. Phil Brown's contract as manager was confirmed ended on 7 June 2010.

=== Results ===
Date	Opponents	H / A	Result	Scorers	Attendance	Notes
15 August	Chelsea	A	2–1	Hunt (28), Drogba (37, 90+2)	41,597
18 August	Tottenham Hotspur	H	1–5	Defoe (10, 45, 90+4), Palacios (14), Hunt (25), Keane (78)	24,735
22 August	Bolton Wanderers	H	1–0	Ghilas (61)	22,999
29 August	Wolverhampton Wanderers	A	1–1	Geovanni (3), Stearman (46)	27,906
12 September	Sunderland	A	4–1	Bent (13 pen., 66), Zayatte (44, 75 o.g.), Reid (49)	38,997
19 September	Birmingham City	H	0–1	O'Connor (75)	23,759
26 September	Liverpool	A	6–1	Torres (12, 28, 47), Geovanni (15), Gerrard (61), Babel (88, 90+1)	44,392
3 October	Wigan Athletic	H	2–1	Vennegoor of Hesselink (60), Geovanni (68), Sinclair (87)	22,822
19 October	Fulham	A	0–2	Zamora (43), Kamara (67)	22,943
24 October	Portsmouth	H	0–0		23,720
31 October	Burnley	A	2–0	Alexander (20 pen., 77)	20,219
8 November	Stoke City	H	2–1	Etherington (29), Olofinjana (62), Vennegoor of Hesselink (90+1)	24,516
21 November	West Ham United	H	3–3	Franco (5), Collison (11), Bullard (27, (45+1 pen.), Zayatte (44), da Costa (69)	24,909
25 November	Everton	H	3–2	Hunt (9), Dawson (20), Marney (28), Zayatte (49 o.g.), Saha (65 pen.)	24,685
28 November	Manchester City	A	1–1	Wright-Phillips (45+1), Bullard (82 pen.)	46,382
5 December	Aston Villa	A	3–0	Dunne (13), Milner (29), Carew (88 pen.)	39,748
12 December	Blackburn Rovers	H	0–0		24,124
19 December	Arsenal	A	3–0	Denilson (45+4), Eduardo (59), Diaby (80)	60,006
27 December	Manchester United	H	1–3	Rooney (45+2), Fagan (60 pen.), Dawson (73 o.g.), Berbatov (82)	24,627
29 December	Bolton Wanderers	A	2–2	Klasnić (20), Davies (61), Hunt (71, 78)	20,696
16 January	Tottenham Hotspur	A	0–0		35,729
24 January	Manchester United	A	4–0	Rooney (8, 82, 86, 90+3)	73,933
30 January	Wolverhampton Wanderers	H	2–2	Vennegoor of Hesselink (11), Gardner (49 o.g.), Hunt (52 pen.), Jarvis (67)	24,957
2 February	Chelsea	H	1–1	Mouyokolo (30), Drogba (42)	24,957
6 February	Manchester City	H	2–1	Altidore (31), Boateng (54), Adebayor (59)	24,959
10 February	Blackburn Rovers	A	1–0	Myhill (16 o.g.)	23,518
20 February	West Ham United	A	3–0	Behrami (3), Cole (59), Faubert (90+3)	33,971
7 March	Everton	A	5–1	Arteta (17, 39), Cairney {32}, Garcia (51 o.g.), Donovan (82), Rodwell (86)	34,682
13 March	Arsenal	H	1–2	Arshavin (14), Bullard (28 pen.), Bendtner (90+3)	25,023
20 March	Portsmouth	A	3–2	Folan (27, 73), Smith (37), O'Hara (88), Kanu (89)	16,513
27 March	Fulham	H	2–0	Bullard (16 pen.), Fagan (48)	24,361
3 April	Stoke City	A	2–0	Fuller (6), Lawrence (90)	27,604
10 April	Burnley	H	1–4	Kilbane (3), Paterson (35), Alexander (64 pen., 70 pen.), Elliott (90+6)	24,369
17 April	Birmingham	A	0–0		26,669
21 April	Aston Villa	H	0–2	Agbonlahor (13), Milner (76 pen.)	23,842
24 April	Sunderland	H	0–1	Bent (7)	25,012
3 May	Wigan Athletic	A	2–2	Moses (30), Atkinson (42), Cullen (64), Gohouri (90+3)	20,242
9 May	Liverpool	H	0–0		25,030

=== Results by round ===
Round	1	2	3	4	5	6	7	8	9	10	11	12	13	14	15	16	17	18	19	20	21	22	23	24	25	26	27	28	29	30	31	32	33	34	35	36	37	38
Ground	A	H	H	A	A	H	A	H	A	H	A	H	H	H	A	H	H	A	H	A	A	A	H	H	H	A	A	A	H	A	H	A	H	A	H	H	A	H
Result	L	L	W	D	L	L	L	W	L	D	L	W	D	W	D	L	D	L	L	D	D	L	D	D	W	L	L	L	L	L	W	L	L	D	L	L	D	D
Position	11	19	15	14	16	19	19	18	18	18	18	17	16	15	14	15	16	17	19	19	17	18	19	18	14	17	17	18	19	19	18	18	19	18	18	18	18	19

Updated to match(es) played on 9 May 2010. Source: Hull City Results
A = Away; H = Home; W = Win; D = Draw; L = Loss

=== Final league table ===
Pos	Team	Pld	W	D	L	GF	GA	GD	Pts	Qualification or relegation
16	Wigan Athletic	38	9	9	20	37	79	−42	36	
17	West Ham United	38	8	11	19	47	66	−19	35	
18	Burnley (R)	38	8	6	24	42	82	−40	30	Relegation to Football League Championship
19	Hull City (R)	38	6	12	20	34	75	−41	30	Relegation to Football League Championship
20	Portsmouth (R)	38	7	7	24	34	66	−32	19 (Note: Portsmouth were docked nine points for entering administration.)	Relegation to Football League Championship

Source: Barclays Premier League
(R) Relegated

=== Records ===
Top Goalscorer Stephen Hunt

Assists

Appearances

Attendance
Average:
Highest:
Lowest:

== FA Cup ==
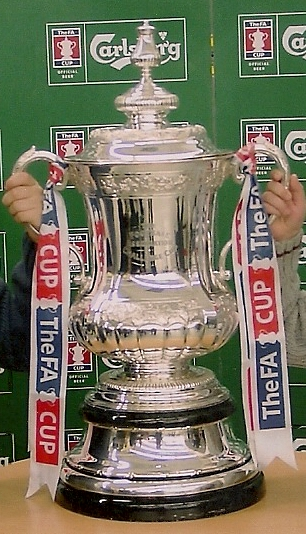
The FA Cup Trophy

=== Summary ===
On Sunday 29 November the draw for the F.A. Cup third round was made, Hull City were drawn away to fellow Premier League side Wigan Athletic.

=== Results ===
Date	Opponents	H / A	Result	Scorers	Attendance	Notes
2 January 2010	Wigan Athletic	A	4–1	Geovanni (35), N'Zogbia (47),(66), McCarthy (63), Sinclair (90+1)	5,335

=== Records ===
Top Goalscorer

Assists

Appearances

Attendance
Average:
Highest:
Lowest:

== League Cup ==
=== Summary ===
On 12 August the draw for the League Cup second round was made. Hull were seeded so they couldn't get another Premier League side. Hull City were drawn at home to Football League One side Southend United. The match took place at the KC stadium on 25 August 2009 with Hull quickly off the mark with Tom Cairney scoring after seven minutes. They went further ahead from a Nicky Barmby free-kick which Jozy Altidore hit in. Southend replied minutes later on half-time through Franck Moussa. In the second half Geovanni came on and scored giving Hull a 3–1 victory putting then into the League Cup third round. The draw took place on 29 August 2009 and Hull were drawn at home to fellow Premier League team Everton. The game took place on 23 September 2009 at the KC Stadium. Hull lost the game 0–4 ending their cup run for this season.

=== Results ===
Date	Opponents	H / A	Result	Scorers	Attendance	Notes
25 August	Southend United	H	3–1	Cairney (7), Altidore (42), Moussa (45), Geovanni (75)	7,994
23 September	Everton	H	0–4	Yakubu (11), Jô (20), Gosling (24), Osman (57)	13,558

=== Records ===
Top Goalscorer

Assists

Appearances

Attendance
Average:
Highest:
Lowest:

== Friendlies ==
Date	Opponents	H / A	Result	Scorers	Attendance	Notes
26 February 2010	Galway United	A	0–1	Barmby (38)	2,257

== See also ==
- Hull City A.F.C. seasons
