= Mark Cullen (English footballer) =

English footballer

Personal information
- Full name: Mark Cullen
- Date of birth: 21 April 1992 (age 34)
- Place of birth: Ashington, England
- Height: 5 ft 9 in (1.76 m)
- Position: Striker

Youth career
- –2006: Newcastle United
- 2008–2010: Hull City

Senior career*
Years	Team	Apps	(Gls)
2010–2013	Hull City	24	(1)
2011	→ Bradford City (loan)	4	(0)
2011–2012	→ Bury (loan)	4	(0)
2012	→ Bury (loan)	10	(1)
2013	→ Stockport County (loan)	16	(4)
2013–2015	Luton Town	71	(21)
2015–2019	Blackpool	89	(21)
2019	→ Carlisle United (loan)	9	(0)
2019–2021	Port Vale	36	(7)
2021–2022	Hartlepool United	17	(4)
2022–2023	AFC Fylde	4	(1)
2023–2026	Bamber Bridge	60	(5)
Total		344	(65)
- * Club domestic league appearances and goals

Mark Cullen (born 21 April 1992) is an English former professional footballer who played as a striker.

A former Newcastle United youth-team player, he went on to graduate from the Hull City Academy and make his Premier League debut for the club in the 2009–10 season. He spent the next three seasons on loan at Bradford City, Bury and Stockport County, before taking a free transfer move to Luton Town in May 2013. Luton won promotion back into the English Football League as champions of the Conference Premier at the end of the 2013–14 season. He was sold to Blackpool for a fee of £180,000 in June 2015 after a successful season in League Two. Blackpool were relegated from League One the next year but secured an immediate promotion after Cullen scored the winning goal in the 2017 League Two play-off final.

He then struggled with injuries over the next two years, spending time on loan at Carlisle United before he was allowed to move on to Port Vale in June 2019. He spent two seasons at the Vale, though he struggled for first-team appearances, and moved on to Hartlepool United in August 2021. He then signed permanently for National League North side AFC Fylde six months later. He ended his career after three seasons with Bamber Bridge.

== Career ==
=== Hull City ===
Born in Ashington, Northumberland, Cullen spent his early years with Newcastle United's youth academy before being released at the age of 14. He joined the Hull City youth system on a two-year scholarship in June 2008. He made his first-team debut as a 67th-minute substitute for Kamel Ghilas in a 4–1 defeat to Wigan Athletic in the FA Cup third round on 2 January 2010. Cullen was given a place in the team after scoring 27 goals for the youth team in the 2009–10 season. He made his Premier League debut on 24 April, when he came on as a substitute for George Boateng in the 75th-minute of a 1–0 defeat to Sunderland at the KC Stadium. He scored his first goal in senior football in his first start for the club, in a 2–2 draw at Wigan on 3 May. He then went on to start in Hull's last game of the 2009–10 season, a 0–0 home draw with Liverpool.

Cullen scored his second and final goal for Hull in a 2–1 League Cup second round defeat by Brentford on 24 August 2010. He made 17 Championship appearances in the 2010–11 season and in January 2011, Cullen, along with fellow youth team graduate Tom Cairney, signed a new contract with the club until the summer of 2013. A few days later, Cullen joined League Two club Bradford City on a one-month loan; manager Peter Taylor had originally enquired about Cullen the previous year but at the time instead opted to sign Ryan Kendall. He played four games for Bradford before returning to Hull.

At the start of the 2011–12 season, Cullen was loaned to League One club Bury for six months. However, he made only four appearances for Bury before returning to Hull in January 2012. He featured in four Championship games for Hull in March but was otherwise absent from Nick Barmby's first-team plans. On 7 August 2012, Cullen returned to Bury for a further loan period on the same day that manager Richie Barker left Gigg Lane to manage Crawley Town. He played in 12 games, scoring once in a 2–2 draw with Stevenage. His loan spell was brought to an end on 18 October following a shin injury. On 31 January 2013, Cullen went out on a month-long loan to Stockport County in the Conference Premier. This was later extended until the end of the 2012–13 season. Cullen scored two goals in a 2–0 win over Barrow on 12 March. He scored a total of four goals in 16 games at Edgeley Park as Ian Bogie's side were relegated to the Conference North. In contrast, Hull won promotion back to the Premier League at the end of the season, however, manager Steve Bruce allowed Cullen to leave on a free transfer after deciding not to offer the 21-year-old a new contract.

=== Luton Town ===
On 17 May 2013, Cullen signed a two-year contract with the Conference Premier club Luton Town. He scored his first goals for the club in a 3–2 win over Lincoln City on 21 September. Cullen was primarily used as a substitute for much of the 2013–14 season as the goalscoring form of Andre Gray and Paul Benson kept him out of the starting lineup. He came on as a substitute against Cambridge United to score what the Luton News called a 90th-minute "stunning" equaliser that kept Luton 15 points clear of their nearest title rivals on 11 March. Cullen regained a place in the starting line-up towards the end of the season, scoring three goals in five games as Luton won promotion to League Two. He played 36 times and scored 10 goals in all competitions during the season, and in May 2014, he signed a new three-year contract to keep him at Kenilworth Road until the end of 2016–17.

Cullen was promoted to a regular starting place in the team for the 2014–15 season after Luton sold Andre Gray. He was named as League Two Player of the Month for October after scoring five goals, including a "perfect hat-trick" – scoring with his head, left foot and right foot – in a 3–1 victory over Dagenham & Redbridge. However, manager John Still revealed that the striker had expressed a wish to leave the club in February and an unnamed club approached to take him in on loan. Cullen stated that he wished to play at a higher level and also wanted to move further north to be closer to his family. He played in 47 games in all competitions, scoring 14 goals to end the campaign as Luton's top-scorer.

=== Blackpool ===
On 30 June 2015, Cullen signed for League One club Blackpool on a three-year deal, who paid Luton a transfer fee of £180,000. Manager Neil McDonald said that "he's an inter-link player who can go in behind and has said he will even play wide if he needs to" and set him a target of 20 goals for the upcoming campaign. Cullen scored both of his side's goals in a 2–2 draw with Colchester United on his debut on 8 August. He ended the 2015–16 season as the club's top-scorer with nine goals in 43 games and Blackpool were relegated down to League Two. He scored 13 goals from 40 appearances in the 2016–17 campaign, again leaving him as the club's top-scorer; this tally included a hat-trick against former club Luton Town in the first leg of the play-off semi-finals at Bloomfield Road. Blackpool eliminated Luton and Cullen went on to score the winning goal as Blackpool beat Exeter City 2–1 in the League Two play-off final at Wembley Stadium.

He was restricted to just nine appearances in the 2017–18 season after undergoing surgery to resolve a hamstring injury. He signed a new one-year contract with Blackpool in May 2018, with the club retaining the option of a further year. However, he suffered a stress fracture on his leg in November. He joined League Two club Carlisle United on 28 January 2019 on loan until the end of the 2018–19 season. Carlisle manager Steven Pressley said that Cullen rejected the chance to join a League One club to go to Brunton Park, but admitted that the striker was still two weeks away from full fitness. He made his first start for Carlisle at Colchester United on 23 February. Pressley said his side was weakened after he was taken off for fitness reasons on 69 minutes. His injury problems continued after he suffered a tear in his groin, which kept him out of action for six weeks. He ended his loan spell without scoring in three starts and six substitute appearances. He left Blackpool after manager Terry McPhillips opted not to take up the option to extend Cullen's contract by a further 12 months; he was the club's longest-serving player at the time of his departure. He was linked with a return to Bradford City, who were managed by former Blackpool boss Gary Bowyer.

=== Port Vale ===
On 26 June 2019, Cullen signed a one-year contract with League Two club Port Vale. He described the move as a "fresh start" following a long spell struggling with injuries as the club entered a new era with new owners in Carol and Kevin Shanahan, and a new manager in John Askey. He scored in his first start at Vale Park, converting from the penalty spot in a 2–1 defeat to Burton Albion in the EFL Cup on 13 August. He found first-team opportunities limited at the start of the 2019–20 season, but nevertheless boasted a record of four goals from four starts and six substitute appearances after a brace against Newcastle United U21 in the EFL Trophy on 12 November. He again dropped down the pecking order, before replacing a suspended Tom Pope to score a brace in a 3–0 home win over Colchester United on 15 February to earn himself a place on the EFL team of the week. He signed a new one-year contract after he ended the campaign with eight goals in 25 appearances.

Cullen opened the 2020–21 league season on 12 September by scoring both goals in a 2–0 home victory over Crawley Town. However, he struggled with ankle, calf and knee injuries at various points throughout the campaign. New manager Darrell Clarke named Cullen as one of 15 players to be released from the club in May 2021.

=== Hartlepool United ===
Cullen spent July 2021 on trial at newly promoted League Two club Hartlepool United and impressed manager Dave Challinor. On 1 August 2021, he signed a contract of undisclosed length with Hartlepool despite picking up an injury in a pre-season friendly with Spennymoor Town during the trial period. He made his Hartlepool debut as a late substitute in a 1–0 victory against Crawley Town on the opening day of the 2021–22 season. On 19 October, Cullen marked his full league debut for "Pools" with a brace in a 3–1 victory at former club Bradford City. He scored six goals in 27 games for the club, but asked to leave Victoria Park as he fell down the pecking order after Marcus Carver and Omar Bogle were signed during the January transfer window.

=== Non-League ===
On 22 February 2022, Cullen signed an 18-month contract with AFC Fylde of the National League North after joining on a free transfer; manager Jim Bentley admitted that "I have tried to sign him on a few occasions in the past". Having played as a substitute in a defeat to Darlington at Mill Farm later that day, he marked his full debut four days later with a goal in a 2–0 win at Blyth Spartans. However, he ruptured his Anterior cruciate ligament during his fourth appearance for the "Coasters" and was ruled out for the rest of the 2021–22 season. He did not feature in the 2022–23 campaign and was released upon the conclusion of the season.

Cullen went on to join Bamber Bridge of the Northern Premier League Premier Division. He scored a hat-trick in a 7–4 win at Lancaster City in the quarter-finals of the FA Challenge Trophy. He ended the 2023–24 season with seven goals from 34 games. He scored five goals in 27 matches during the 2024–25 campaign. After two years working as a parcel courier, he was appointed Football Enrichment Officer at Blackpool's Community Trust in November 2025. He retired from playing at the end of the 2025–26 season.

== Style of play ==
Stockport County assistant manager Stuart Watkiss described Cullen as "an out-and-out goalscorer" whose "finishing is the best part of his game". He also possesses good movement and close ball control skills.

== Career statistics ==
Appearances and goals by club, season and competition
Club	Season	League			FA Cup		League Cup		Other		Total	
Club	Season	Division	Apps	Goals	Apps	Goals	Apps	Goals	Apps	Goals	Apps	Goals
Hull City	2009–10	Premier League	3	1	1	0	0	0	—		4	1
Hull City	2010–11	Championship	17	0	0	0	1	1	—		18	1
Hull City	2011–12	Championship	4	0	1	0	0	0	—		5	0
Hull City	2012–13	Championship	0	0	1	0	—		—		1	0
Hull City	Total		24	1	3	0	1	1	—		28	2
Bradford City (loan)	2010–11	League Two	4	0	—		—		—		4	0
Bury (loan)	2011–12	League One	4	0	—		—		—		4	0
Bury (loan)	2012–13	League One	10	1	—		1	0	1 (Note: Appearance in Football League Trophy)	0	12	1
Bury (loan)	Total		14	1	—		1	0	1	0	16	1
Stockport County (loan)	2012–13	Conference Premier	16	4	—		—		—		16	4
Luton Town	2013–14	Conference Premier	29	8	2	1	—		5 (Note: Appearances in FA Trophy)	1	36	10
Luton Town	2014–15	League Two	42	13	4	1	1	0	0	0	47	14
Luton Town	Total		71	21	6	2	1	0	5	1	83	24
Blackpool	2015–16	League One	41	9	1	0	1	0	0	0	43	9
Blackpool	2016–17	League Two	27	9	4	0	1	0	8 (Note: Five appearances in EFL Trophy, three appearances and four goals in League Two play-offs)	4	40	13
Blackpool	2017–18	League One	9	0	0	0	0	0	0	0	9	0
Blackpool	2018–19	League One	12	3	1	1	2	0	1 (Note: Appearance(s) in EFL Trophy)	0	16	4
Blackpool	Total		89	21	6	1	4	0	9	4	108	26
Carlisle United (loan)	2018–19	League Two	9	0	—		—		—		9	0
Port Vale	2019–20	League Two	18	5	1	0	1	1	5	2	25	8
Port Vale	2020–21	League Two	18	2	0	0	1	0	3	1	22	3
Port Vale	Total		36	7	1	0	2	1	8	3	47	11
Hartlepool United	2021–22	League Two	17	4	5	2	1	0	4	0	27	6
AFC Fylde	2021–22	National League North	4	1	—		—		—		4	1
AFC Fylde	2022–23	National League North	0	0	0	0	—		0	0	0	0
AFC Fylde	Total		4	1	0	0	0	0	0	0	4	1
Bamber Bridge	2023–24	Northern Premier League; Premier Division	29	1	1	0	—		4 (Note: Two appearances and four goals in the Lancashire FA Challenge Trophy; two appearances and two goals in the FA Trophy)	6	34	7
Bamber Bridge	2024–25	Northern Premier League; Premier Division	22	4	2	1	—		3 (Note: Two appearances in the FA Trophy; one appearance in the Lancashire FA Challenge Trophy)	0	27	5
Bamber Bridge	2025–26	Northern Premier League; Premier Division	9	0	1	0	—		3 (Note: Two appearances and one goal in the Lancashire FA Challenge Trophy, one appearance in the FA Trophy)	1	13	1
Bamber Bridge	Total		60	5	4	1	0	0	10	7	74	13
Career total			344	65	25	6	10	2	37	15	416	88

== Honours ==
Luton Town

- Conference Premier: 2013–14

Blackpool

- EFL League Two play-offs: 2017

Individual

- Football League Two Player of the Month: October 2014
