= Kyle Wilson (English footballer) =

English footballer (born 1985)

Personal information
- Full name: Kyle Philip Wilson
- Date of birth: 14 November 1985 (age 40)
- Place of birth: Wirral, England
- Position: Forward

Youth career
- Crewe Alexandra

Senior career*
Years	Team	Apps	(Gls)
2003–2006	Crewe Alexandra	0	(0)
2005–2006	→ Altrincham (loan)	5	(0)
2006–2007	Barrow	43	(7)
2007–2008	Witton Albion		
2008	Droylsden	1	(0)
2008–2009	FC United of Manchester	27	(21)
2009–2010	Macclesfield Town	4	(0)
2010	→ FC United of Manchester (loan)	7	(4)
2010	Hyde	3	(0)
2010–2011	Chester	29	(3)
2011–2012	Bangor City	29	(6)
2012–2013	Nantwich Town	37	(8)
2013–2014	Witton Albion	16	(6)
2014–2015	Conwy Borough	30	(4)

International career
	England U18	5	(2)
	England U19	6	(1)
	England U20	1	(0)
- * Club domestic league appearances and goals

Kyle Philip Wilson (born 14 November 1985) is an English former footballer. He has previously played for Crewe Alexandra, Macclesfield Town, FC United of Manchester, Chester, and Bangor City. He also represented England at youth level earning 12 caps.

== Career ==
=== Crewe Alexandra ===
Wilson started his career rising through the youth ranks at Crewe Alexandra. In October 2005, he was loaned out to Conference National side Altrincham, to boost his development. He played five games for the club.

Making 2 appearances for Crewe, he was released from his contract at the end of the 2005–06 season.

=== Barrow ===
After leaving Crewe, Wilson had a brief trial at Wrexham but later in the Summer of 2006, he signed for Barrow who were managed at the time by his father, Phil Wilson. Wilson suffered an anterior mediate cruciate ligament injury in September 2006, forcing him to miss the rest of the season. He left the club following the dismissal of his father as manager in November 2007.

=== Droylsden ===
On 5 January 2008, he made an appearance for Conference outfit Droylsden, in the 2–1 defeat to Crawley Town.

=== FC United of Manchester ===
He spent 2008–09 with FC United of Manchester, where he excelled, scoring 25 goals in 32 games. He returned to the Football League in May 2009, signing with Macclesfield Town.

=== Macclesfield Town ===
He made his debut in the 4–0 defeat by Notts County at Moss Rose on 15 August 2009. He was a late substitute for Matthew Tipton.

On 26 January 2010, it was announced Wilson was rejoining FC United of Manchester on loan, for a month. His loan period was extended but he was recalled his parent club in early March.

He was released by Macclesfield, along with 10 other players at the end of the 2009–10 season.

=== Hyde ===
On 20 July 2010, Wilson signed for Conference North side Hyde. He became Hyde's sixth signing of summer 2010. He made his official debut on 14 August when he saw his team lose 5–0 to AFC Telford United at the New Bucks Head. On 1 October 2010, he was released by Hyde due to continuas injury problems.

=== Chester ===
On 30 September 2010 he joined Chester. He went on to make 35 appearances in total, scoring 7 goals.

=== Bangor City ===
In June 2011 he joined Bangor City for the 2011–12 campaign.

=== Nantwich Town ===
He returned to the English non-league system in July 2012, signing with Nantwich Town.
