= 2017 EFL League Two play-off final =

- The match took place at Wembley Stadium.
- Event: 2016–17 EFL League Two
Blackpool	Exeter City
2	1
- Date: 28 May 2017
- Venue: Wembley Stadium, London
- Referee: Darren England
- Attendance: 23,380

The 2017 EFL League Two play-off final was an association football match played on 28 May 2017 at Wembley Stadium, London, between Blackpool and Exeter City. The match determined the fourth and final team to gain promotion from EFL League Two, English football's fourth tier, to EFL League One. The top three teams of the 2016–17 EFL League Two season gained automatic promotion to League One, while the teams placed from fourth to seventh in the table took part in play-off semi-finals; the winners of these semi-finals competed for the final place for the 2017–18 season in League One. Blackpool finished in seventh place while Exeter ended the season in fifth position. Luton Town and Carlisle United were the losing semi-finalists.

The match kicked off around 3 p.m in front of 23,380 spectators and was refereed by Darren England. Three minutes into the game, Potts put Blackpool ahead: Jack Payne made a long pass to Mark Cullen, who played it to Potts. He ran on and struck the ball first-time into the far corner of the Exeter goal. With five minutes of the half remaining, David Wheeler scored the equaliser with a lob over Sam Slocombe from just inside the Blackpool penalty area to make it 1–1 at half-time. In the 64th minute, Cullen put Blackpool back into the lead. Potts made a run into the Exeter penalty area and crossed the ball: Pym deflected it with his foot only for Cullen to finish it with an outstretched leg. Late pressure from Exeter failed to produce any goals, and despite five minutes of injury time, the match ended 2–1 to Blackpool who were promoted to League One.

Blackpool finished their following season in twelfth place in League One. In their next season, Exeter City finished in fourth position in League Two and qualified for the play-offs where they lost 3–1 against Coventry City in the final.

== Route to the final ==
EFL League Two final table, leading positions
Pos	Team	Pld	W	D	L	GF	GA	GD	Pts
1	Portsmouth	46	26	9	11	79	40	+39	87
2	Plymouth Argyle	46	26	9	11	71	46	+25	87
3	Doncaster Rovers	46	25	10	11	85	55	+30	85
4	Luton Town	46	20	17	9	70	43	+27	77
5	Exeter City	46	21	8	17	75	56	+19	71
6	Carlisle United	46	18	17	11	69	68	+1	71
7	Blackpool	46	18	16	12	69	46	+23	70

Exeter City finished the regular 2016–17 season in fifth place in EFL League Two, the fourth tier of the English football league system, two places ahead of Blackpool. Both therefore missed out on the three automatic places for promotion to EFL League One and instead took part in the play-offs to determine the fourth promoted team. Exeter City finished fourteen points behind Doncaster Rovers (who were promoted in third place), and sixteen behind Plymouth Argyle (promoted in second) and league winners Portsmouth. Blackpool ended the season two places and one point behind Exeter City.

Blackpool's opponents for their play-off semi-final were Luton Town with the first match of the two-legged tie being held at Bloomfield Road in Blackpool on 14 May 2017. Mark Cullen put the home side ahead after 19 minutes with a low shot but Luton replied, first through Dan Potts and then Isaac Vassell, to make it 2–1 at half-time. Two minutes into the second half, Cullen levelled the game with his second goal, a strike from around 25 yards (23 m). He completed his hat-trick midway through the half with a penalty and the match ended 3–2 to Blackpool. The second leg of the semi-final took place at Kenilworth Road in Luton four days later. Nathan Delfouneso opened the scoring for the visitors midway through the first half before Kelvin Mellor's own goal made it 1–1. Scott Cuthbert's header just before half-time made it 2–1 to Luton and twelve minutes after the break, Danny Hylton converted a penalty to increase his side's lead. Armand Gnanduillet's header made it 3–2 with less than 15 minutes remaining, and in the fifth minute of injury time, an own goal from Stuart Moore ensured the match ended 3–3. With an aggregate victory of 6–5, Blackpool progressed to the final.

Exeter City faced Carlisle United in their play-off semi-final, the first leg being played at Brunton Park in Carlisle on 14 May 2017. The visitors took the lead on 15 minutes when Joel Grant scored but Exeter's Jordan Moore-Taylor scored an own goal to level the match. Ryan Harley restored Exeter's lead just before half-time and David Wheeler made it 3–1 eleven minutes into the second half. John O'Sullivan's cross floated into the Exeter goal to make it 3–2 midway through the second half and Shaun Miller's header levelled the match which ended 3–3. The second leg of the semi-final was played St James Park in Exeter four days later. Ollie Watkins scored the only goal of the first half to put Exeter ahead on aggregate. With eleven minutes of the game remaining, Watkins scored his and Exeter's second, but Jason Kennedy pulled one back for the visitors two minutes later. O'Sullivan scored in the 90th minute to make it 2–2, but five minutes into injury time, Jack Stacey scored for Exeter to make it 3–2, and Exeter won the tie 6–5 on aggregate.

== Match ==
=== Background ===
Blackpool had been relegated to League Two the previous season and were thus aiming for an instant return to League One. Exeter City had played in League Two since being relegated at the end of the 2011–12 season. During the regular season, Blackpool were undefeated in the two matches between the clubs, winning 2–0 at Bloomfield Road in August 2016 and drawing 2–2 at St James Park the following February. Blackpool's top scorers during the regular season were Potts with 12 (10 in the league, 1 in the FA Cup and 1 in the League Cup) followed by Vassell with 11 (all in the league). Exeter's leading marksmen were Wheeler who had 17 goals for the season (all in the league), followed by Reid with 14 (13 in the league, 1 in the FA Cup) and Watkins with 13 (all in the league).

Exeter City were allocated 20,000 tickets for the match. Blackpool supporters were allocated the east end of Wembley Stadium while Exeter City fans occupied the west end. Due to an ongoing dispute with Blackpool owner, Owen Oyston and his family, Blackpool Supporters' Trust called on the club to donate its share of its gate receipts to charity so they could attend the match without their money going towards the Oyston family.

The referee for the match was Darren England, who was assisted by James Bell and Lee Venamore. The fourth official was David Webb while the reserve assistant referee was Helen Byrne. Hawk-Eye was also in use for the final. Before the match, a minute's silence was held to commemorate the Manchester Arena bombing which had taken place six days prior to the final. Faryl Smith performed the national anthem before kick-off. Sky Sports was the exclusive live broadcaster for the final in the UK.

Watkins had been voted the EFL Young Player of the Season at the EFL Awards. Blackpool adopted a 3–5–2 formation while Exeter played as a 4–4–2. Exeter played in luminous yellow shirts, shorts and socks, while Blackpool's kit was tangerine and white shirts, white shorts and tangerine socks.

=== Summary ===
Exeter kicked off the match around 3 p.m on 28 May 2017 in front of 23,380 spectators. Three minutes into the game, Potts put Blackpool ahead: Jack Payne made a long pass to Cullen, who played it to Potts. He ran on and struck the ball first-time into the far corner of the Exeter goal. In the 11th minute, Wheeler headed to Watkins whose shot from inside the penalty area was saved by Sam Slocombe. Seven minutes later, Jake Taylor's shot from 8 yards (7.3 m) was blocked by Blackpool's Tom Aldred. Lloyd James then struck a shot wide of Blackpool's goal from 25 yards (23 m). In the 31st minute, Blackpool were forced to make their first substitution of the match as Aldred was unable to continue with an ankle injury, and he was replaced by Bright Osayi-Samuel. With five minutes of the half remaining, Wheeler scored the equaliser. Woodman played a long ball towards him, which he controlled on the run. As Slocombe came out, Wheeler lobbed him from just inside the area to make it 1–1 at half-time.

Three minutes into the second half, Osayi-Samuel struck a shot wide of the Exeter goal. In the 50th minute, a half-volley from Vassell from a tight angle was saved by the Exeter goalkeeper Christy Pym. In the 57th minute Exeter's Grant was replaced by Reuben Reid before Troy Brown limped off, with Pierce Sweeney coming on as a substitute. In the 59th minute, Cullen received the first yellow card of the game. Pym then caught Mellor's header from a corner. Blackpool made their second substitution of the game in the 62nd minute when Ian Black came on for Payne. Two minutes later, Cullen put Blackpool back into the lead. Potts made a run into the Exeter penalty area and crossed the ball: Pym deflected it with his foot only for Cullen to finish it with an outstretched leg. In the 71st minute, Exeter made their final personnel change of the afternoon with Lee Holmes replacing Craig Woodman. Danns shot then flew over the Exeter crossbar and with fifteen minutes to go, Cullen was replaced by Jordan Flores. In the 78th minute, Reid's shot from the edge of the Blackpool box went just wide. Late pressure from Exeter failed to produce any goals, and despite five minutes of injury time, the match ended 2–1 to Blackpool who were promoted to League One.

=== Details ===
28 May 2017
15:00 BST

Blackpool	2–1	Exeter City
Potts 3'; Cullen 64'	Report	Wheeler 40'

Wembley Stadium, London
Attendance: 23,380
Referee: Darren England

Blackpool	Exeter City

GK	1	Sam Slocombe	(yellow card) 90+2'
CB	6	Will Aimson
CB	15	Tom Aldred (c)		(substituted off) 31'
CB	5	Clark Robertson
RM	2	Kelvin Mellor
CM	28	Jack Payne		(substituted off) 62'
CM	8	Brad Potts
CM	35	Neil Danns
LM	23	Colin Daniel	(yellow card) 90+5'
RS	7	Kyle Vassell
LS	9	Mark Cullen	(yellow card) 59'	(substituted off) 75'
Substitutes:
GK	27	Dean Lyness
DF	16	Eddie Nolan
MF	12	Jordan Flores	(yellow card) 90+3'	(substituted in) 75'
MF	21	Bright Osayi-Samuel	(yellow card) 66'	(substituted in) 31'
MF	37	Ian Black		(substituted in) 62'
FW	30	Nathan Delfouneso
FW	31	Armand Gnanduillet
Manager:
Gary Bowyer

GK	30	Christy Pym
RB	28	Jack Stacey
CB	39	Troy Brown	(substituted off) 58'
CB	15	Jordan Moore-Taylor (c)
LB	3	Craig Woodman	(substituted off) 71'
RM	11	David Wheeler
CM	4	Lloyd James
CM	7	Ryan Harley
LM	25	Jake Taylor
RS	14	Ollie Watkins
LS	12	Joel Grant	(substituted off) 57'
Substitutes:
GK	1	Bobby Olejnik
DF	6	Jordan Tillson
DF	29	Luke Croll
DF	31	Pierce Sweeney	(substituted in) 58'
MF	10	Lee Holmes	(substituted in) 71'
FW	19	Liam McAlinden
FW	33	Reuben Reid	(substituted in) 57'
Manager:
Paul Tisdale

Statistics
Statistic	Blackpool	Exeter City
Goals scored	2	1
Total shots	16	13
Shots on target	5	2
Ball possession	36%	64%
Corner kicks	8	3
Fouls committed	7	11
Yellow cards	5	0
Red cards	0	0

== Post-match ==
The Blackpool manager said: "It was a massive team effort ... Exeter, a great footballing team, put us on the back foot." His counterpart Paul Tisdale said: "I'm disappointed, clearly. I'm disappointed that we probably didn't do our best in the last half an hour ... It's a tough environment to play in – the pressure – and the performance doesn't always get the result." Winning the final made Blackpool the most successful team in the history of the play-offs, having won five finals in eight attempts.

Blackpool finished their following season in twelfth place in League One. In their next season, Exeter City finished in fourth position in League Two and qualified for the play-offs where they lost 2–1 against Coventry City in the final.
