= Johnville F.C. (Waterford) =

Johnville Football Club is an Irish association football club based in Waterford and founded in 1959. Johnville play their home games in St Martin’s Park. The club has won the Munster Junior Cup on several occasions.

== Notable former players ==
- Stephen Hunt, former Republic of Ireland international
- Alan Kirby, former Republic of Ireland under-21 international
