= Stephen Hunt (footballer, born 1981) =

Irish footballer

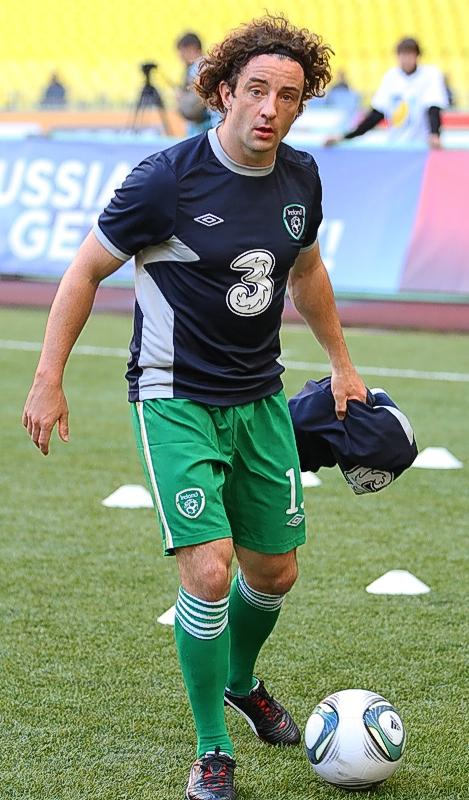
- Hunt with the Republic of Ireland ahead of the UEFA Euro 2012 qualifying Group B game against Russia

Personal information
- Full name: Stephen Patrick Hunt
- Date of birth: 1 August 1981 (age 45)
- Place of birth: Portlaw, Ireland
- Height: 1.72 m (5 ft 8 in)
- Position: Winger

Youth career
- –: Johnville F.C.
- –: Carrick United
- –1999: Crystal Palace

Senior career*
Years	Team	Apps	(Gls)
1999–2001	Crystal Palace	3	(0)
2001–2005	Brentford	135	(25)
2005–2009	Reading	155	(17)
2009–2010	Hull City	27	(6)
2010–2013	Wolverhampton Wanderers	56	(7)
2013–2015	Ipswich Town	40	(0)
2016	Coventry City	5	(0)
Total		421	(55)

International career
2000	Republic of Ireland U21	1	(0)
2007–2012	Republic of Ireland	39	(1)
- * Club domestic league appearances and goals

Stephen Patrick Hunt (born 1 August 1981) is an Irish former professional footballer who played as a winger for Crystal Palace, Brentford, Reading, Hull City, Wolverhampton Wanderers, Ipswich Town and Coventry City. At international level, he made 39 appearances scoring once for the Republic of Ireland national team. His younger brother, Noel, was also a footballer.

== Club career ==
=== Early years ===
Hunt became known for his creative and skilful play as well as his work rate as a winger. Although born in Laois, Hunt grew up in Clonea-Power, Waterford. He was a talented under-age hurler and soccer player. He played for Waterford hurlers at under-15 and under-16 levels. Hurling was his first love.

Hunt's first introduction to organised football was when he moved to the Christian Brothers' Secondary School in Carrick-on-Suir, County Tipperary at the age of 11. During his time at secondary school he also began playing for Waterford soccer side Johnville F.C. and won a Munster Schools Junior Cup with Carrick CBS. This gained Hunt a degree of recognition and he played in the Kennedy Cup with Waterford. He later played for Carrick United at various age levels, before going to England starting his career as a trainee with Crystal Palace. Failing to make an impact on the first team, Hunt had trials with clubs including Dundee United before leaving to join Brentford. In his four years at the West London club, he became an integral part of the team and stood in as captain for Michael Dobson for a run of matches during the 2003–04 season.

In 2005 Hunt rejected a new contract and decided to leave Brentford. After agreeing to join Bradford City, late interest from Reading, then in the Football League Championship, made him change his mind.

=== Reading ===
Hunt was denied more starting appearances in his first Reading season by the form of Bobby Convey. He still made a good contribution, appearing from the bench, as Reading won the Championship title and promotion to the Premiership during the 2005–06 season.

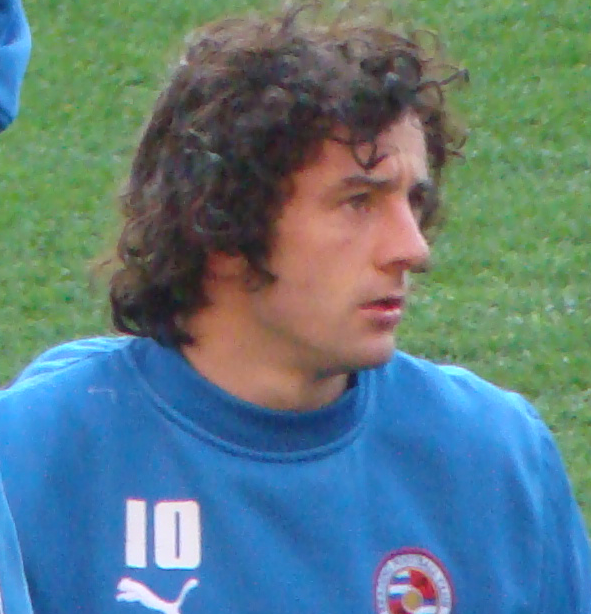
Hunt with Reading in 2008

On 14 October 2006, Hunt's knee collided with Chelsea's goalkeeper Petr Čech when the Reading player was lunging at the ball, resulting in Čech undergoing surgery for a depressed fracture of the skull. After the injury, Čech had to wear head protection during every game. Following the incident, Premier League officials, players, pundits, player's representatives and even MPs expressed views either condemning or supporting Hunt and the others involved in the aftermath of the incident. The FA eventually confirmed that no action would be taken against Hunt but, in the meantime, both Hunt and teammate Ibrahima Sonko, involved in a collision in the same match with Čech's replacement Carlo Cudicini, had allegedly received death threats from Chelsea fans. This incident occurred during Hunt's Premier League debut. Hunt scored his first Premier League goal in the 6–0 home win over West Ham.

During the January 2008 transfer window, Reading rejected a series of bids (peaking at £5.5 million) from Sunderland for Hunt, but Reading confirmed that they had no intention of selling players at that time. On 1 February 2008, Hunt signed a new deal with Reading keeping him at the club until the summer of 2011. In 2007–08, Hunt scored 6 goals in 39 appearances for Reading's first team but could not prevent the club being relegated on goal difference.

On 4 February 2009, Reading confirmed that Hunt had signed a new three-and-a-half-year contract, that would keep him at the club until the summer of 2012. However, after the club failed in their attempt to win an instant return to the Premier League, losing in the playoff semi finals to Burnley, Hunt announced his intention to leave Reading in the hope securing a move back to the Premier League.

=== Hull City ===
On 13 August 2009 it was confirmed that Hunt had signed for Hull City for an undisclosed fee, believed to be around the region of £3.5 million. He scored his first goal for the club 28 minutes into his debut against Chelsea on 15 August 2009. This was also the first goal of the 2009–10 Premier League season. However, he was taunted by Chelsea fans throughout the game, due to the incident with Čech. Hunt also scored in his next match, his home debut for Hull City, but they were beaten 5–1 by Tottenham.

In the January transfer window, Hull rejected a £5 million bid for Hunt from Wolverhampton Wanderers. Shortly after, Hunt suffered a foot injury that ruled him out of the run-in. In his absence, the club were relegated amid growing financial worries.

=== Wolverhampton Wanderers ===
On 21 June 2010 Wolverhampton Wanderers signed Hunt on a three-year deal for an undisclosed fee, reported to be £3 million. Hunt, still recovering from his foot injury from his time with Hull, did not return to action until several months into the season, making his Wolves debut as a substitute against Chelsea on 23 October 2010. He scored his first goal for the club on 27 November, a 3–2 win against Sunderland.

In the early part of 2011, Hunt suffered calf and hernia injuries which kept him out of action for up to three months. He returned from injury for the final five fixtures of the season and scored three minutes from time on the final day of the season against Blackburn Rovers to guarantee Wolves their Premier League safety.

Although undergoing a groin operation, Hunt was largely a regular player for Wolves throughout the 2011–12 season as the club suffered relegation. His campaign back in the Championship was hampered by a persistent hip injury but he played regularly throughout the final months as the team was once again relegated. At the conclusion of the season it was announced that Hunt would be free to leave as his contract had expired. In total he made 66 appearances for the club, scoring eight times.

=== Ipswich Town ===
On 8 November 2013, Hunt signed a short-term deal with Ipswich Town. He made his debut for Ipswich the following day on 9 November, in a 2–3 away win over Blackpool at Bloomfield Road. He made 24 appearances during his first season at the club without scoring.

On 30 June 2014, Hunt signed a further one-year deal with Ipswich. He made his first appearance of the 2014–15 season on 18 October, starting in a 1–1 draw with Blackburn Rovers. He featured less regularly over the course of the season due to the form of wingers Paul Anderson and Jay Tabb. He made 19 appearances during the season, helping Ipswich reach the Championship play-offs. He left Ipswich following the end of the season after the club did not offer him a new deal.

=== Coventry City ===
On 8 January 2016, Hunt signed a short-term deal with League 1 promotion chasing side Coventry City after a short spell as a free agent. He made 5 appearances for the club during the remainder of the season.

He retired from playing football at the end of the 2015–16 season.

He has since founded his own football agency and now represents and manages the careers of a wide range of players across the UK and Europe as their agent and intermediary in contract negotiations and transfers.

== International career ==
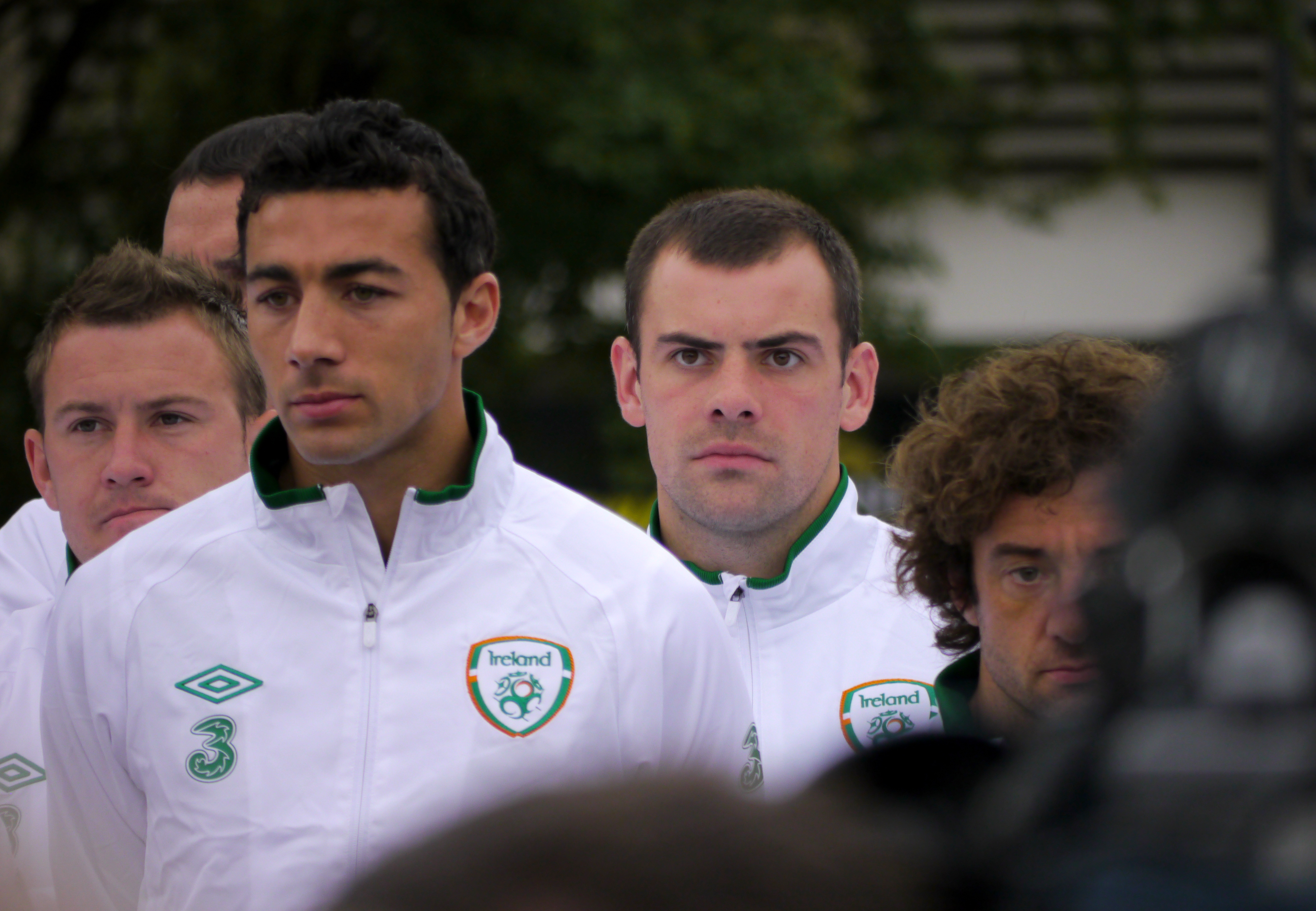
Hunt (far right) during a "welcome ceremony" for the Irish squad in Sopot before UEFA Euro 2012

Hunt earned his first cap for the Republic of Ireland in their 2–1 win away to San Marino on 7 February 2007, coming on as a substitute. Later that year he was sent off following a challenge on Jan Polák in a match against the Czech Republic on 12 September 2007.

The midfielder became a regular member of Giovanni Trapattoni's team that narrowly failed to qualify for the 2010 World Cup. Hunt scored his first, and only international goal through a late penalty in a 2–3 friendly defeat to Poland at Croke Park on 19 November 2008. He was subsequently selected as part of Ireland's squad for the Euro 2012 tournament but did not play in any of their games.

== Personal life ==
Hunt has a sister and three brothers, Noel, James and Anthony and is married to Kevin Doyle's cousin, Joanne. He attended CBS Carrick-on-Suir in County Tipperary.

== Career statistics ==
=== Club ===
Appearances and goals by club, season and competition
Club	Season	League			FA Cup		League Cup		Other		Total	
Club	Season	Division	Apps	Goals	Apps	Goals	Apps	Goals	Apps	Goals	Apps	Goals
Crystal Palace	1999–2000	First Division	3	0	0	0	0	0	—		3	0
Brentford	2001–02	Second Division	35	4	1	0	1	0	4 (Note: One appearance in Football League Trophy, three appearances in Second Division play-offs)	0	41	4
Brentford	2002–03	Second Division	42	7	4	2	2	0	2 (Note: Appearance(s) in Football League Trophy)	1	50	10
Brentford	2003–04	Second Division	40	11	2	0	1	0	2	1	45	12
Brentford	2004–05	League One	19	3	4	0	0	0	1	0	24	3
Brentford	Total		135	25	11	2	4	0	9	2	160	29
Reading	2005–06	Championship	38	2	4	1	4	0	—		46	3
Reading	2006–07	Premier League	35	4	1	0	2	0	—		38	4
Reading	2007–08	Premier League	37	5	2	2	1	0	—		40	7
Reading	2008–09	Championship	46	6	0	0	2	1	1 (Note: Appearance in Championship play-offs)	0	49	7
Reading	Total		155	17	7	3	9	1	1	0	172	21
Hull City	2009–10	Premier League	27	6	0	0	0	0	—		27	6
Wolverhampton Wanderers	2010–11	Premier League	20	3	3	1	1	0	—		24	4
Wolverhampton Wanderers	2011–12	Premier League	24	3	2	0	2	0	—		28	3
Wolverhampton Wanderers	2012–13	Championship	12	1	0	0	2	0	—		14	1
Wolverhampton Wanderers	Total		56	7	5	1	5	0	0	0	66	8
Ipswich Town	2013–14	Championship	23	0	1	0	0	0	—		24	0
Ipswich Town	2014–15	Championship	17	0	2	0	0	0	0	0	19	0
Ipswich Town	Total		40	0	3	0	0	0	0	0	43	0
Coventry City	2015–16	League One	5	0	0	0	0	0	0	0	5	0
Career total			421	55	26	6	18	1	10	2	476	64

=== International ===
Appearances and goals by national team and year
National team	Year	Apps	Goals
Republic of Ireland	2007	9	0
Republic of Ireland	2008	6	1
Republic of Ireland	2009	10	0
Republic of Ireland	2010	1	0
Republic of Ireland	2011	11	0
Republic of Ireland	2012	2	0
Total		39	1

Scores and results list Republic of Ireland's goal tally first, score column indicates score after each Hunt goal.

List of international goals scored by Stephen Hunt
No.	Date	Venue	Opponent	Score	Result	Competition	Ref.
1	19 November 2008	Croke Park, Dublin, Republic of Ireland	Poland	1–2	2–3	Friendly	

== Honours ==
Reading

- Football League Championship: 2005–06

Republic of Ireland

- Nations Cup: 2011

Individual

- Football League Championship Player of the Month: December 2008
- PFA Team of the Year: 2008–09 Championship
- Reading Player of the Year: 2007–08
- Hull City Player of the Year: 2009–10
