= Steven Mouyokolo =

French footballer (born 1987)

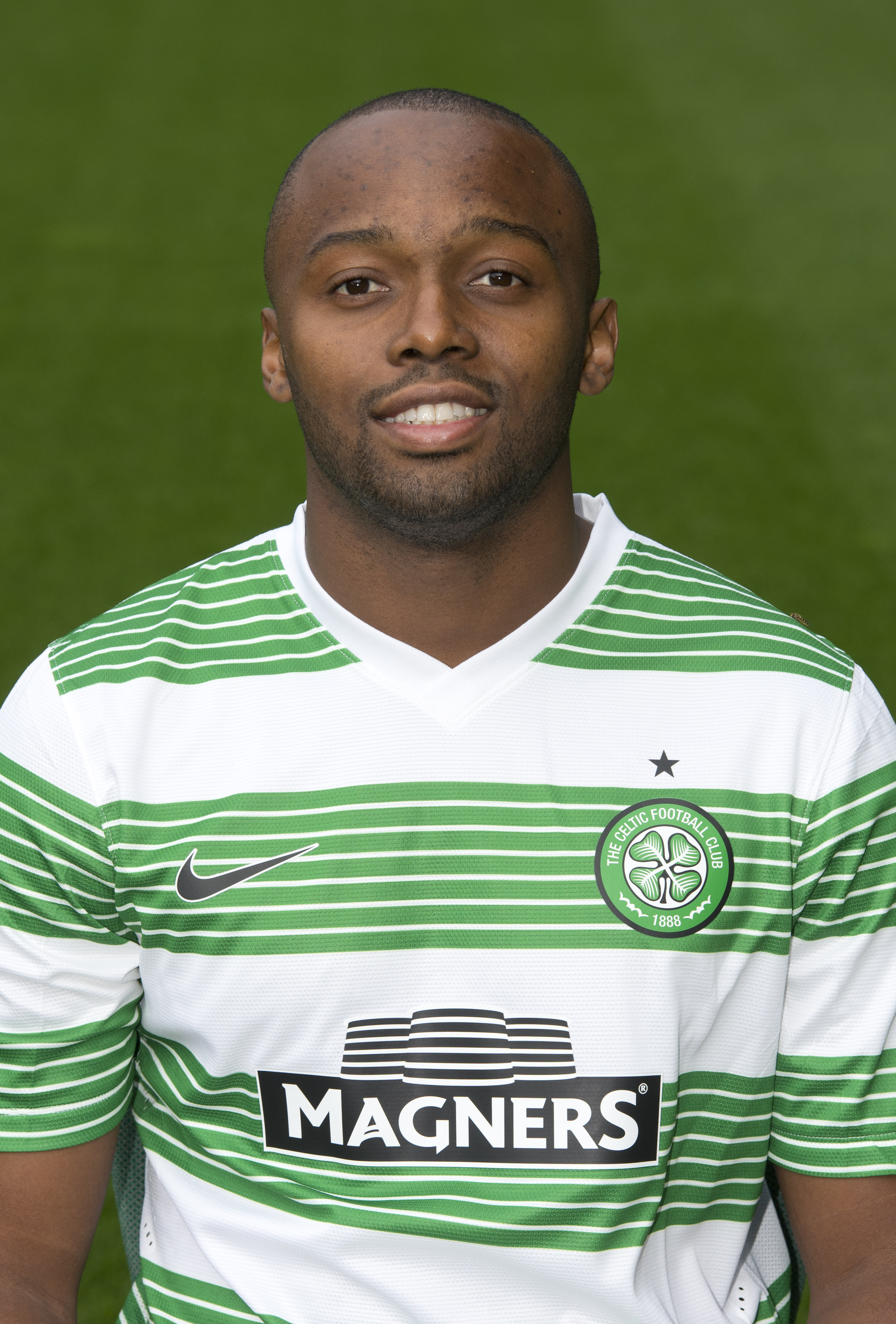
- Mouyokolo with Celtic in 2013

Personal information
- Full name: Steven Stefan Fabrice Mouyokolo
- Date of birth: 24 January 1987 (age 39)
- Place of birth: Melun, Seine-et-Marne, France
- Height: 1.90 m (6 ft 3 in)
- Position: Centre back

Youth career
- –2006: Châteauroux

Senior career*
Years	Team	Apps	(Gls)
2006–2007	Châteauroux	0	(0)
2007–2008	Gueugnon	22	(0)
2008–2009	Boulogne	13	(0)
2009–2010	Hull City	21	(1)
2010–2013	Wolverhampton Wanderers	4	(0)
2011–2012	→ Sochaux (loan)	4	(0)
2013–2014	Celtic	2	(0)
Total		67	(1)
- * Club domestic league appearances and goals

Steven Stefan Fabrice Mouyokolo (born 24 January 1987) is a French former footballer who played as a centre back. His career had been marred by injury.

== Club career ==
=== Early career ===
Mouyokolo was born in Melun, Seine-et-Marne, France, to Congolese parents. He began his senior football career at Ligue 2 side LB Châteauroux. He made his way up to the first team in 2006, but never made a first team appearance for the club, and in 2007 he joined fellow Ligue 2 side FC Gueugnon. He made 22 first team appearances for his new club, and his impressive displays from central defence earned him a move to US Boulogne, also of Ligue 2.

The defender made a bright start to the 2008–09 Ligue 2 season, helping his team to second in the table by December. His performances caught the attention of English Premier League teams Newcastle United, Wigan Athletic, Middlesbrough, Bolton Wanderers and Arsenal.

=== Hull City ===
However, it was Hull City who agreed a fee with Boulogne for the defender on 30 January 2009, but the transfer would not take place until the summer. Mouyokolo officially signed a four-year deal for his new club on 2 June 2009, after helping his former club to promotion to French Ligue 1 for the first time in their history. He scored to earn a 1–1 draw against eventual champions Chelsea on 2 February 2010, but was part of the team that ended up relegated to The Championship.

=== Wolverhampton Wanderers ===
Mouyokolo remained in the English Premier League when he moved to Wolverhampton Wanderers on 18 June 2010 in a four-year deal (with the option of a fifth year) for a fee which was undisclosed but reported in the local media as being £2.5 million. His Wolves debut came in the League Cup tie with Notts County at Molineux on 21 September 2010. He struggled to make an impression in his first season, making only seven appearances in all competitions.

With opportunities limited at Wolves, in June 2011 Mouyokolo was sent on loan to Ligue 1 side Sochaux, with the option to buy the player at the end of the loan. Wolves manager Mick McCarthy said at the time: "We saw huge potential in Steven but he has had injury problems that have limited his opportunities." However, Mouyokolo only managed four appearances for Sochaux in a season marred by injury, including a ruptured cruciate ligament suffered in February 2012, before he returned to Wolves at the end of the season. On 30 January 2013 his contract at Wolves was terminated by mutual consent, making him a free agent after just seven appearances for the club. Mouyokolo says his injury made him realized how lucky he is a footballer.

=== Celtic ===
On 16 July 2013, Mouyokolo signed for Scottish Premier League champions Celtic, after impressing on trial in a series of pre-season games. Mouyokolo says Jan Vennegoor of Hesselink played a role of helping him join the club.

He made his Celtic debut in a 2–0 win against Aberdeen. Mouyokolo went on to make his European debut for the club only three days later against Shakhtar Karagandy in the first leg of the UEFA Champions League play off round. Soon his career at Celtic wasn't as he planned when he sustained Achilles tendon after picking up the injury in training. After a six-month out, Mouyokolo returns to first team action, coming on as a late substitute, in a 2–0 victory against Dundee United on 5 April 2014.

After an injury stricken season with Celtic, Mouyokolo left the club during the summer transfer window after his one-year contract expired.
