= Kamel Ghilas =

Algerian footballer (born 1984)

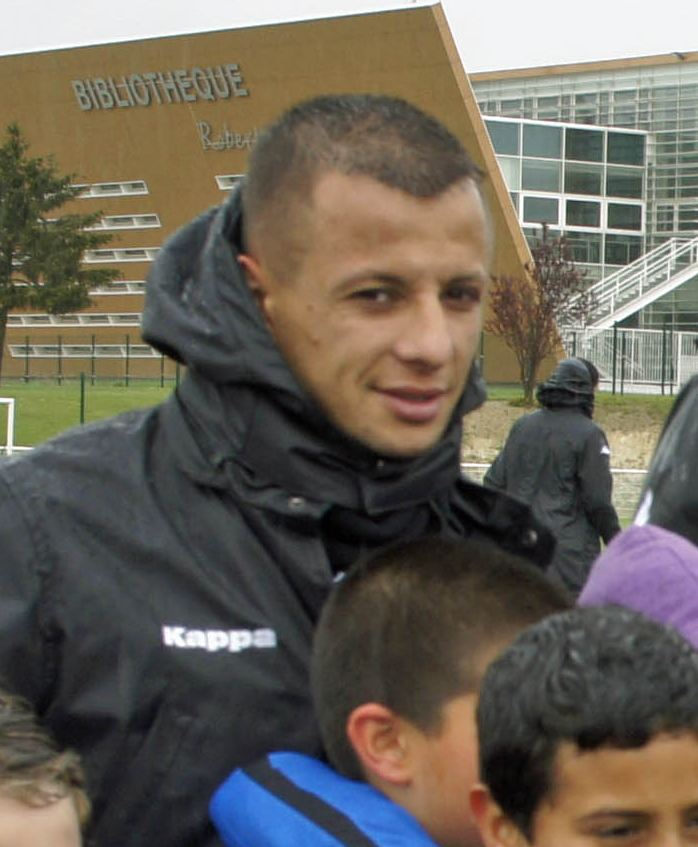
- Ghilas in 2012

Personal information
- Full name: Kamel Fathi Ghilas
- Date of birth: 9 March 1984 (age 42)
- Place of birth: Marseille, France
- Height: 1.77 m (5 ft 10 in)
- Position: Forward

Senior career*
Years	Team	Apps	(Gls)
2001–2003	Vitrolles	6	(1)
2003–2006	Cannes	86	(22)
2006–2008	Vitória Guimarães	59	(18)
2008–2009	Celta Vigo	33	(13)
2009–2012	Hull City	13	(1)
2010–2011	→ Arles-Avignon (loan)	19	(2)
2011–2012	→ Reims (loan)	35	(14)
2012–2014	Reims	24	(0)
2013	Reims II	8	(4)
2014	Charleroi	5	(0)
Total		288	(75)

International career
2007–2012	Algeria	19	(3)
- * Club domestic league appearances and goals

Kamel Fathi Ghilas (born 9 March 1984) is an Algerian former professional footballer who played as a forward.

== Club career ==
=== Early years ===
Born in Marseille, France, Ghilas started his career in amateur football, with ES Vitrolles. At the age of 19 he joined AS Cannes in the Championnat National, quickly breaking into the first team and featuring mostly as a winger.

Ghilas established himself as a starter in the 2004–05 season, going on to lead the team in scoring by netting seven times in 31 appearances. The following year he contributed with 13 as the French Riviera club narrowly missed out on promotion to Ligue 2, finishing two points behind FC Libourne-Saint-Seurin for the third and final spot.

=== Vitória Guimarães ===
Ghilas signed for Vitória S.C. from Portugal in the summer of 2006, penning a two-year contract. In his first year he ranked first in goals scored in his team, helping to a return to the Primeira Liga after one year out.

Ghilas made his debut in the competition on 19 August 2007, starting in a 1–1 home draw against Vitória de Setúbal. He scored six times in a further 20 league appearances to help the side finish a best-ever third and qualify to the UEFA Champions League; however, following a contract dispute, he left the Minho Province club as a free agent.

=== Celta ===
On 12 July 2008, RC Celta de Vigo announced the signing of Ghilas from Vitória, with the player penning a three-year contract worth €300,000 a year. He scored his first goals for the Galicians on 28 September in a 2–1 home win over CD Tenerife, in what was the season's first win.

On 28 July 2009, a fee of £1.7 million was agreed for Ghilas to transfer to Blackburn Rovers in the Premier League – the move was set to be completed pending on the player agreeing personal terms and passing a medical. However, the transfer broke down in the 11th hour, with conflicting reports on the grounds: the English claimed he had failed the medical, whereas the Spaniards claimed that Blackburn had attempted to renegotiate the transfer fee and player's wages at the last minute; they attempted to disprove Rovers' claims by playing him in a friendly the following day.

=== Hull City ===
On 13 August 2009, Ghilas agreed terms with Hull City, signing a four-year deal for which Celta was paid roughly £2 million. He made his debut for his new team nine days later, scoring in a 1–0 victory over Bolton Wanderers in the 61st minute after being fed a through ball from Jozy Altidore.

However, Ghilas failed to perform for the East Yorkshire side subsequently, being loaned to French clubs AC Arles-Avignon and Stade de Reims. He made his debut for the latter on 15 August 2011, netting in a 2–1 win over AS Monaco FC.

=== Late career ===
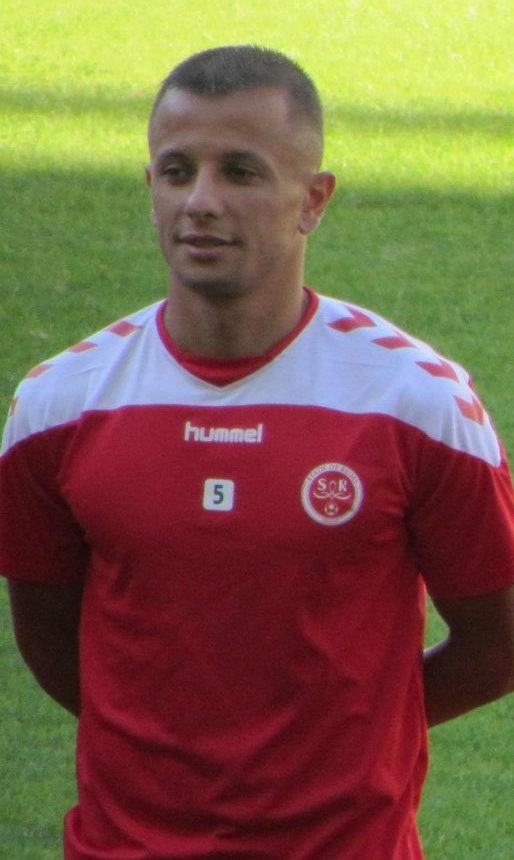
Ghilas lining up for Reims in 2012

After scoring 14 goals in the 2011–12 campaign, being an essential offensive unit as Reims returned to Ligue 1 after more than three decades, Ghilas joined the club on a permanent deal. On 30 January 2014, he moved teams and countries again, joining Belgian Pro League's R. Charleroi S.C. for six months.

== International career ==
Although born in France, Ghilas opted to represent Algeria, making his international debut on 2 June 2007 in a 2008 Africa Cup of Nations qualifier against Cape Verde. Five months later he scored his first goal, in a 3–2 friendly win over Mali.

== Personal life ==
Ghilas' younger brother, Nabil, was also a footballer and a forward. He too played in France, Portugal and for Algeria.

== Career statistics ==
=== Club ===
Appearances and goals by club, season and competition
Club	Season	League			National cup (Note: Includes Coupe de France, Taça de Portugal, Copa del Rey, FA Cup, Coupe de France)		League cup (Note: Includes Coupe de la Ligue, Taça da Liga, League Cup, Coupe de la Ligue)		Total	
Club	Season	Division	Apps	Goals	Apps	Goals	Apps	Goals	Apps	Goals
Vitrolles	2001–02	CFA	6	1						
Vitrolles	2002–03	CFA 2	0	0						
Vitrolles	Total		6	1						
Cannes	2003–04	Championnat National	18	0						
Cannes	2004–05	Championnat National	31	7						
Cannes	2005–06	Championnat National	37	15						
Cannes	Total		86	22						
Vitória Guimarães	2006–07	Segunda Liga	29	12						
Vitória Guimarães	2007–08	Primeira Liga	30	6	2	0				
Vitória Guimarães	Total		59	18						
Celta Vigo	2008–09	Segunda División	33	13	0	0	–		33	13
Hull City	2009–10	Premier League	13	1	1	0	2	0	16	1
Arles-Avignon (loan)	2010–11	Ligue 1	19	2	1	0	0	0	20	2
Reims (loan)	2011–12	Ligue 2	35	14	1	0	0	0	36	14
Reims	2012–13	Ligue 1	23	0	1	0	0	0	24	0
Reims	2013–14	Ligue 1	1	0	0	0	0	0	1	0
Reims	Total		24	0	1	0	0	0	25	0
Reims II	2011–12	CFA 2	8	4	–		–		8	4
Charleroi	2013–14	Belgian Pro League	5	0	0	0	–		5	0
Career total			288	75	6	0	2	0	296	75

=== International ===
List of international goals scored by Kamel Ghilas
No.	Date	Venue	Opponent	Score	Result	Competition
1	20 November 2007	Stade Robert Diochon, Rouen, France	Mali	2–2	3–2	Friendly
2	26 March 2008	Stade Maurice Bacquet, Paris, France	DR Congo	1–1	1–1	Friendly
3	11 February 2009	Stade Mustapha Tchaker, Blida, Algeria	Benin	2–1	2–1	Friendly
