= Ryan Kendall =

English footballer (born 1989)

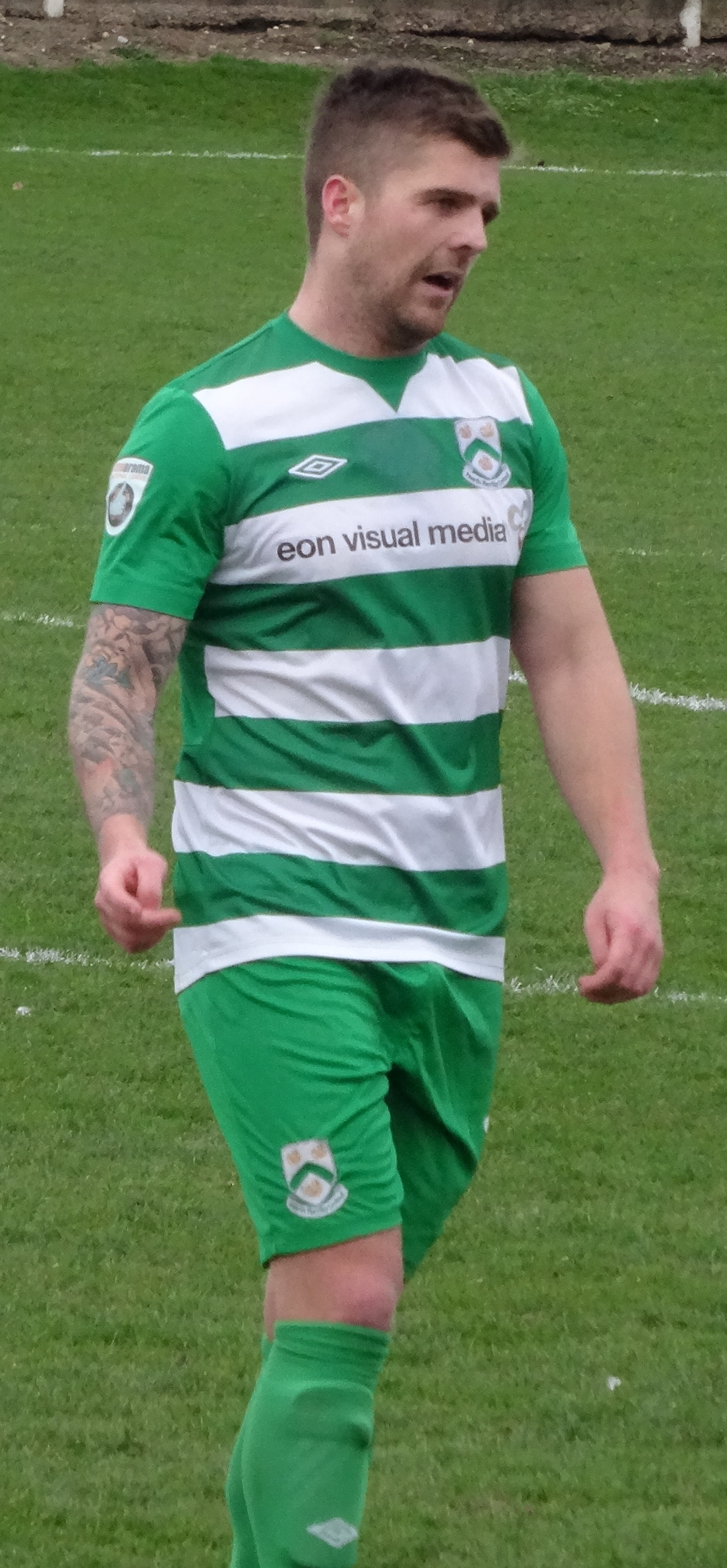
- Kendall playing for North Ferriby United in 2017

Personal information
- Full name: Ryan Paul Kendall
- Date of birth: 14 September 1989 (age 37)
- Place of birth: Hull, England
- Height: 6 ft 1 in (1.85 m)
- Position: Striker

Youth career
- –2009: Hull City

Senior career*
Years	Team	Apps	(Gls)
2009–2010	Hull City	0	(0)
2010	→ Bradford City (loan)	6	(2)
2010	Harrogate Town	1	(0)
2010–2012	Gainsborough Trinity	69	(27)
2012–2014	North Ferriby United	75	(46)
2014	Harrogate Town	9	(0)
2014–2017	North Ferriby United	51	(6)
Total		211	(81)
- * Club domestic league appearances and goals

Ryan Paul Kendall (born 14 September 1989) is an English former professional footballer.

He played as a striker notably in the Football League for Bradford City, where he was on loan from Hull City. He went on to have a career in Non-League football with Harrogate Town, Gainsborough Trinity and North Ferriby United.

== Career ==
Born in Hull, East Riding of Yorkshire, Kendall progressed through Hull City's youth system before signing a professional contract in June 2009. He joined League Two club Bradford City on a one-month loan on 16 March 2010. He made his debut as a 77th-minute substitute in a 2–0 defeat to Hereford United and scored his first goal in a 3–3 draw with Dagenham & Redbridge. Hull announced that he would be released when his contract expired on 30 June 2010.

Kendall joined Harrogate Town after impressing the manager during the summer of 2010. Kendall joined rivals Gainsborough Trinity in October 2010. He made an instant impact, making 31 appearances and contributing 15 of the club's 50 goals in season 2010–11 as they finished 18th in the Conference North.
