= 2024–25 Bristol City F.C. season =

127th season in existence of Bristol City FC

Bristol City
2024–25 season
- Owner: Steve Lansdown
- Head coach: Liam Manning
- Stadium: Ashton Gate
- Championship: 6th
- FA Cup: Third round
- EFL Cup: First round
- Top goalscorer: League: Anis Mehmeti (12); All: Anis Mehmeti (12)
- Highest home attendance: 25,915 (v. Sunderland, Championship, 18 April 2025)
- Average home league attendance: 22,423
Home colours	Away colours	Third colours

The 2024–25 season was the 127th season in the history of Bristol City Football Club and their tenth consecutive season in the Championship. In addition to the domestic league, the club participated in the FA Cup and the EFL Cup.

== Transfers ==
=== In ===
Date	Pos	Player	Transferred from	Fee	Ref.
1 July 2024	FW	(France) Fally Mayulu	(Austria) Rapid Wien	£2,500,000	
19 July 2024	FW	(Republic of Ireland) Sinclair Armstrong	(England) Queens Park Rangers	£2,500,000	
16 August 2024	FW	(England) Scott Twine	(England) Burnley	£3,200,000	
23 August 2024	MF	(England) Marcus McGuane	(England) Oxford United	Undisclosed	
30 August 2024	DF	(Republic of Ireland) Luke McNally	(England) Burnley	£1,750,000	

=== Out ===
Date	Pos	Player	Transferred to	Fee	Ref
30 June 2024 (Note: Following his release, Acey joined Guernsey as a free agent on 24 August.)	MF	(England) Ben Acey	(England) Guernsey	Free	
30 June 2024 (Note: Following his release, Bell joined Maidenhead United as a free agent on 1 July.)	DF	(Wales) Zac Bell	(England) Maidenhead United	Free	
30 June 2024	GK	(England) Mac Boyd	Free agent	Released	
30 June 2024 (Note: Following his release, Francois joined Auckland as a free agent on 9 January.)	FW	(Australia) Marlee Francois	(New Zealand) Auckland FC	Free	
30 June 2024 (Note: Following his release, Hutton joined Risca United as a free agent on 1 July.)	FW	(England) Callum Hutton	(Wales) Risca United	Free	
30 June 2024 (Note: Following his release, Idehen joined Derry City as a free agent on 23 August.)	DF	(England) Duncan Idehen	(Northern Ireland) Derry City	Free	
30 June 2024 (Note: Following his release, James joined Wrexham as a free agent on 25 October.)	MF	(England) Matty James	(Wales) Wrexham	Free	
30 June 2024 (Note: Following his release, Kadji joined Weston-super-Mare as a free agent on 30 July.)	MF	(England) Dylan Kadji	(England) Weston-super-Mare	Free	
30 June 2024	MF	(Wales) Andy King	Retired		
30 June 2024 (Note: Following his release, Leeson joined Bishop's Cleeve as a free agent on 1 July.)	DF	(Wales) Harry Leeson	(England) Bishop's Cleeve	Free	
30 June 2024 (Note: Following his release, Weimann joined Blackburn Rovers as a free agent on 1 August.)	FW	(Austria) Andreas Weimann	(England) Blackburn Rovers	Free	
30 June 2024 (Note: Following his release, Wiles-Richards joined Bath City as a free agent on 1 July.)	GK	(England) Harvey Wiles-Richards	(England) Bath City	Free	
16 August 2024	FW	(Scotland) Tommy Conway	(England) Middlesbrough	£5,000,000	
17 January 2025	FW	(England) Brandon Bak	(England) Weston-super-Mare	Free	
3 February 2025	MF	(England) Tommy Backwell	(England) Cheltenham Town	Free	
3 February 2025	MF	(Wales) Omar Taylor-Clarke	(Scotland) Dunfermline Athletic	Free	

=== Loaned in ===
Date	Pos	Player	Loaned from	Until	Ref
9 July 2024	FW	(Japan) Yū Hirakawa	(Japan) Machida Zelvia	31 May 2025	
14 August 2024	MF	(England) George Earthy	(England) West Ham United	31 May 2025	

=== Loaned out ===
Date	Pos.	Player	Loaned to	Until	Ref.
1 July 2024 (Note: The loan was announced on 24 June, and officially commenced on 1 July.)	DF	(Canada) Jamie Knight-Lebel	(England) Crewe Alexandra	31 May 2025	
1 July 2024 (Note: The loan was announced on 21 June, and officially commenced on 1 July.)	FW	(England) Seb Palmer-Houlden	(Scotland) Dundee	31 May 2025	
1 July 2024 (Note: The loan was announced on 11 June, and officially commenced on 1 July.)	FW	(Italy) Ephraim Yeboah	(England) Doncaster Rovers	1 January 2025	
5 August 2024	DF	(Germany) Raphael Araoye	(England) Yeovil Town	17 October 2024	
17 August 2024	FW	(England) Brandon Bak	(England) Weston-super-Mare	6 January 2025	
21 August 2024	FW	(England) Josh Stokes	(England) Cambridge United	31 May 2025	
23 August 2024	MF	(England) Taylor Gardner-Hickman	(England) Birmingham City	30 May 2025 (Note: On 30 May, Gardner-Hickman joined Birmingham City on a permanent basis.)	
2 September 2024	GK	(Wales) Josey Casa-Grande	(England) Bath City	2 October 2024	
28 September 2024	MF	(England) Marley Rose	(England) Weston-super-Mare	6 January 2025	
6 December 2024	GK	(Wales) Josey Casa-Grande	(England) Weymouth	3 January 2025	
10 December 2024	DF	(Germany) Raphael Araoye	(England) Weston-super-Mare	8 January 2025	
3 January 2025	DF	(England) Rob Atkinson	(England) Portsmouth	31 May 2025	
16 January 2025	MF	(England) Tommy Backwell	(England) Cheltenham Town	3 February 2025 (Note: On 3 February, Backwell joined Cheltenham Town on a permanent basis.)	
26 January 2025	FW	(France) Fally Mayulu	(Austria) Sturm Graz	31 May 2025	
28 January 2025	DF	(Scotland) Kal Naismith	(England) Luton Town	31 May 2025	
31 January 2025	FW	(Italy) Ephraim Yeboah	(Scotland) Dunfermline Athletic	31 May 2025	

=== New Contracts ===
Date	Pos	Player	Until	Squad	Ref
18 November 2024	FW	(England) Luke Skinner	2027	Academy	
2 February 2025	FW	(Republic of Ireland) Mark Sykes	2026	First team	
22 May 2025	DF	(England) Cameron Pring	2028	First team	

== Pre-season and friendlies ==
On 9 May, Bristol City announced they would host Willem II in what would be the final pre-season friendly. A second friendly was later confirmed against Aldershot Town. A further two more were added on June 4, versus Newport County and Exeter City, both behind closed doors. On 10 June, City announced a friendly against Cheltenham Town.

Win Draw Loss Fixtures

23 July 2024 Friendly	Bristol City	2–0	Newport County	Failand
12:00 BST	Wells 69'; Armstrong 88'			Stadium: Robins High Performance Centre; Attendance: 0 (behind closed doors)

23 July 2024 Friendly	Aldershot Town	0–2	Bristol City	Aldershot
19:45 BST		Report	Bell 9'; Pring	Stadium: Recreation Ground; Attendance: 1,672

26 July 2024 Friendly	Cheltenham Town	0–3	Bristol City	Cheltenham
19:45 BST		Report	Armstrong 1'; Wells 4' (pen.); Sykes 84'	Stadium: Whaddon Road

27 July 2024 Friendly	Bristol City	2–1	Exeter City	Failand
13:00 BST	Cornick 57', 70'	Report	Magennis 82' (pen.)	Stadium: Robins High Performance Centre; Attendance: 0 (behind closed doors)

3 August 2024 Friendly	Bristol City	0–0	Willem II	Bristol
15:00 BST		Report		Stadium: Ashton Gate; Attendance: 10,136

== Competitions ==
=== Championship ===
==== League table ====
Pos	Team	Pld	W	D	L	GF	GA	GD	Pts	Promotion, qualification or relegation
4	Sunderland (O, P)	46	21	13	12	58	44	+14	76	Qualified for the Championship play-offs
5	Coventry City	46	20	9	17	64	58	+6	69	Qualified for the Championship play-offs
6	Bristol City	46	17	17	12	59	55	+4	68	Qualified for the Championship play-offs
7	Blackburn Rovers	46	19	9	18	53	48	+5	66	
8	Millwall	46	18	12	16	47	49	−2	66	

Source: English Football League
Rules for classification: 1) Points; 2) Goal difference; 3) Number of goals scored; 4) Head-to-head results; 5) Wins; 6) Away goals; 7) Penalty points (sec 9.5); 8) Number of 12-point sending off offences; 9) Play-off (only if needed to determine promotion/relegation)
(O) Play-off winners; (P) Promoted

==== Results summary ====
Overall								Home						Away					
Pld	W	D	L	GF	GA	GD	Pts	W	D	L	GF	GA	GD	W	D	L	GF	GA	GD
46	17	17	12	59	55	+4	68	13	7	3	36	20	+16	4	10	9	23	35	−12

Last updated: 3 May 2025.
Source: Soccerway

==== Results by round ====
Round	1	2	3	4	5	6	7	8	9	10	11	12	13	14	15	16	17	18	19	20	21	22	23	24	25	26	27	28	29	30	31	32	33	34	35	36	37	38	39	40	41	42	43	44	45	46
Ground	A	H	H	A	A	H	A	H	H	A	A	H	A	H	A	H	A	H	A	A	H	A	H	H	A	H	A	A	H	A	H	H	A	H	A	H	A	H	A	H	H	A	H	A	A	H
Result	D	W	D	L	L	W	D	D	D	W	D	D	W	L	W	L	L	W	L	D	D	L	W	W	D	W	L	D	W	D	L	W	D	W	W	D	D	W	L	W	W	D	W	L	L	D
Position	13	6	10	14	17	13	14	13	16	10	10	11	9	11	10	11	12	11	12	11	12	12	11	10	10	8	9	9	8	9	9	7	8	8	7	7	7	7	8	6	5	5	5	5	5	6
Points	1	4	5	5	5	8	9	10	11	14	15	16	19	19	22	22	22	25	25	26	27	27	30	33	34	37	37	38	41	42	42	45	46	49	52	53	54	57	57	60	63	64	67	67	67	68

Source: EFL
A = Away; H = Home; W = Win; D = Draw; L = Loss; P = Postponed

==== Matches ====
On 26 June, the Championship fixtures were announced.

Win Draw Loss Fixtures

10 August 2024 1	Hull City	1–1	Bristol City	Kingston upon Hull
12:30 BST	Estupiñán 90+1' (pen.)	Report	Williams (yellow card) 11'; Knight (yellow card) 62'; Mayulu 84'	Stadium: MKM Stadium; Attendance: 21,011; Referee: Keith Stroud

17 August 2024 2	Bristol City	4–3	Millwall	Bristol
15:00 BST	Mehmeti 3'; Armstrong 12'; Sykes (yellow card) 50'; Mayulu 78'; Twine 88'	Report	De Norre (yellow card) 49'; Esse 51'; Bradshaw 54'; Watmore 64'; Jensen (yellow card) 67'	Stadium: Ashton Gate; Attendance: 20,733; Referee: Sunny Singh Gill

24 August 2024 3	Bristol City	1–1	Coventry City	Bristol
12:30 BST	Tanner 45+2', (yellow card) 74'; Williams (yellow card) 77'	Report	Bidwell (yellow card) 40'; Palmer 76', (yellow card) 87'; Wright (yellow card) 77'; Binks (yellow card) 81'	Stadium: Ashton Gate; Attendance: 21,545; Referee: Andrew Kitchen
Note: Fixture was initially scheduled for a 15:00 kick-off, but was moved for live Sky Sports broadcast.

31 August 2024 4	Derby County	3–0	Bristol City	Derby
15:00 BST	Goudmijn 28'; Jackson 60'; Nyambe (yellow card) 77'; Ozoh 89'	Report		Stadium: Pride Park Stadium; Attendance: 29,270; Referee: Tom Nield

14 September 2024 5	Blackburn Rovers	3–0	Bristol City	Blackburn
15:00 BST	Travis 17'; Ohashi 55', 70'	Report	McNally (yellow card) 11'; Sykes (yellow card) 44'; Mehmeti (yellow card) 74'; Roberts (yellow card) 79'	Stadium: Ewood Park; Attendance: 14,087; Referee: Stephen Martin

21 September 2024 6	Bristol City	2–1	Oxford United	Bristol
15:00 BST	Williams (yellow card) 11'; Armstrong 57'; Wells 76'	Report	El Mizouni (yellow card) 11'; Rodrigues 28'; Brown (yellow card) 53'; Moore (yellow card) 66'; Vaulks (yellow card) 74'	Stadium: Ashton Gate; Attendance: 28,125; Referee: Will Finnie

29 September 2024 7	Swansea City	1–1	Bristol City	Swansea
15:00 BST	Cabango 15'; Naughton (yellow card) 49'	Report	Twine (yellow card) 56'; Knight 76'; Sykes (yellow card) 90+2'; Wells (yellow card) 90+4'	Stadium: Swansea.com Stadium; Attendance: 16,328; Referee: Josh Smith
Note: Fixture was initially scheduled for 28 September, but was moved for live Sky Sports broadcast.

2 October 2024 8	Bristol City	0–0	Sheffield Wednesday	Bristol
20:00 BST	Williams (yellow card) 48'; Sykes (yellow card) 82'	Report	Windass (yellow card) 36'	Stadium: Ashton Gate; Attendance: 20,293; Referee: Anthony Backhouse
Note: Fixture was initially scheduled for a 19:45 kick-off, but was moved for live Sky Sports broadcast.

6 October 2024 9	Bristol City	1–1	Cardiff City	Bristol
15:00 BST	McCrorie (yellow card) 49'; McNally 73'; Sykes (yellow card) 90+2'	Report	Tanner 54'; Ralls (yellow card) 65'	Stadium: Ashton Gate; Attendance: 22,664; Referee: Bobby Madley
Note: Fixture was initially scheduled for 5 October, but was moved for live Sky Sports broadcast.

19 October 2024 10	Middlesbrough	0–2	Bristol City	Middlesbrough
15:00 BST	Hackney (yellow card) 3'; Van den Berg 8'; Azaz (yellow card) 13'; Doak (yellow card) 50'; Ayling (yellow card) 56'	Report	Mehmeti 27'; McCrorie (yellow card) 41'; McNally (yellow card) 43'; Hirakawa 45+2'; Earthy (yellow card) 83'	Stadium: Riverside Stadium; Attendance: 24,438; Referee: Sam Allison

22 October 2024 11	Stoke City	2–2	Bristol City	Stoke-on-Trent
19:45 BST	Koumas 2'; Moran 14', (yellow card) 74'; Bae Jun-ho (yellow card) 45+1'; Thompson (yellow card) 90+3'	Report	Wells 50', 52'; Williams (yellow card) 51'	Stadium: Bet365 Stadium; Attendance: 19,679; Referee: David Webb

26 October 2024 12	Bristol City	0–0	Leeds United	Bristol
12:30 BST	Morrison (yellow card) 85'	Report	Gnonto (yellow card) 40'; Tanaka (yellow card) 50'; Bogle (yellow card) 67'	Stadium: Ashton Gate; Attendance: 25,283; Referee: James Linington
Note: Fixture was initially scheduled for a 15:00 kick-off, but was moved for live Sky Sports broadcast.

2 November 2024 13	Preston North End	1–3	Bristol City	Preston
15:00 GMT	Frøkjær-Jensen (yellow card) 6'; McCann (yellow card) 40'; Greenwood 48'; Potts (yellow card) 62'; Holmes (yellow card) 76'	Report	Hirakawa 6'; Wells 51', (yellow card) 65'; Roberts (yellow card) 70'; Vyner (yellow card) 80'; Bird 81'	Stadium: Deepdale; Referee: Tom Nield

5 November 2024 14	Bristol City	1–2	Sheffield United	Bristol
19:45 GMT	Mehmeti 75' (pen.); Dickie (red card) 90+5'	Report	Cooper (yellow card) 74'; Oné 86', (yellow card) 90+9'; Burrows 90+8'	Stadium: Ashton Gate; Attendance: 18,736; Referee: John Busby

9 November 2024 15	Norwich City	0–2	Bristol City	Norwich
15:00 GMT	Fisher (yellow card) 36'; Sainz (yellow card) 69'	Report	Mehmeti 16'; Wells 63'	Stadium: Carrow Road; Attendance: 26,423; Referee: Farai Hallam

23 November 2024 16	Bristol City	0–1	Burnley	Bristol
12:30 GMT	McNally (yellow card) 22'; Dickie (yellow card) 90+4'; Twine (yellow card) 90+8'	Report	Anthony 23'; Estève (yellow card) 67'; Mejbri (yellow card) 69'; Trafford (yellow card) 70'; Pires (yellow card) 74'	Stadium: Ashton Gate; Attendance: 20,800; Referee: Bobby Madley
Note: Fixture was initially scheduled for a 15:00 kick-off, but was moved for live Sky Sports broadcast.

26 November 2024 17	Watford	1–0	Bristol City	Watford
19:45 GMT	Sierralta (yellow card) 46'; Andrews 53'; Bayo (yellow card) 80'	Report	Twine (yellow card) 72'; Pring (yellow card) 87'	Stadium: Vicarage Road; Attendance: 17,579; Referee: James Linington

30 November 2024 18	Bristol City	4–0	Plymouth Argyle	Bristol
15:00 GMT	Twine 57'; Mehmeti 62', 70'; Wells (yellow card) 66'; Armstrong 90'	Report	Pálsson (yellow card) 31'; Grimshaw (yellow card) 66'; Forshaw (yellow card) 89'	Stadium: Ashton Gate; Attendance: 24,317; Referee: Tim Robinson

7 December 2024 19	Portsmouth	3–0	Bristol City	Portsmouth
15:00 GMT	Bishop 20'; Dozzell (yellow card) 41'; Murphy 62'; Lang 71', (yellow card) 83'; Lane (yellow card) 86'	Report	Dickie (yellow card) 8'; Pring (yellow card) 12'; Armstrong (yellow card) 90+2'	Stadium: Fratton Park; Attendance: 20,415; Referee: Sunny Singh Gill

10 December 2024 20	Sunderland	1–1	Bristol City	Sunderland
19:45 GMT	Rigg (yellow card) 68'; Roberts (yellow card) 86', (goal) 90+3'	Report	Vyner (yellow card) 37'; McNally (yellow card) 44', (goal) 62'; Mehmeti (yellow card) 83'; Pring (yellow card) 84'; Knight (yellow card) 90+2'	Stadium: Stadium of Light; Attendance: 35,421; Referee: Dean Whitestone

14 December 2024 21	Bristol City	1–1	Queens Park Rangers	Bristol
12:30 GMT	Knight (yellow card) 26'; Twine 60'	Report	Dunne (yellow card) 45+2'; Field (yellow card) 58'; Smyth 65'	Stadium: Ashton Gate; Attendance: 20,925; Referee: Lewis Smith
Note: Fixture was initially scheduled for a 15:00 kick-off, but was moved for live Sky Sports broadcast.

22 December 2024 22	West Bromwich Albion	2–0	Bristol City	West Bromwich
15:00 GMT	Molumby (yellow card) 19'; Johnston 34', 43'; Bartley (yellow card) 80'	Report	McNally (yellow card) 16'; Pring (yellow card) 28'; Knight (yellow card) 73'	Stadium: The Hawthorns; Attendance: 25,910 (2,530 away); Referee: Thomas Kirk
Note: Live on Sky Sports

26 December 2024 23	Bristol City	1–0	Luton Town	Bristol
15:00 GMT	Twine 47', (yellow card) 58'; Dickie (yellow card) 85'	Report	Morris (yellow card) 58'	Stadium: Ashton Gate; Attendance: 21,828; Referee: Peter Bankes

29 December 2024 24	Bristol City	3–0	Portsmouth	Bristol
15:00 GMT	Mehmeti 15', 32'; Dickie 35'; McCrorie (yellow card) 55'	Report	Lang (yellow card) 67'	Stadium: Ashton Gate; Attendance: 24,560; Referee: John Busby

1 January 2025 25	Plymouth Argyle	2–2	Bristol City	Plymouth
13:00 GMT	Al Hajj 50'; Sorinola (yellow card) 65'; Pleguezuelo 90+1'	Report	Mehmeti 32'; Knight 56'	Stadium: Home Park; Attendance: 17,005; Referee: Tim Robinson
Note: Fixture was initially scheduled for a 15:00 kick-off, but was moved after following agreement between the two sides.

4 January 2025 26	Bristol City	1–0	Derby County	Bristol
15:00 GMT	McNally 19'; Mehmeti (yellow card) 28'; McCrorie (yellow card) 35'; Roberts (yellow card) 90+2'	Report	Thompson (yellow card) 45+2'	Stadium: Ashton Gate; Attendance: 22,040; Referee: Will Finnie

18 January 2025 27	Coventry City	1–0	Bristol City	Coventry
15:00 GMT	Thomas-Asante 62'	Report		Stadium: Coventry Building Society Arena; Attendance: 26,695; Referee: Lewis Smith

22 January 2025 28	Sheffield Wednesday	2–2	Bristol City	Sheffield
19:45 GMT	Gassama 16'; S. Charles (yellow card) 27'; Bernard 53'; Valentín (yellow card) 78'	Report	Twine (yellow card) 27'; Wells 51'; Vyner (yellow card) 57'; McCrorie 86'	Stadium: Hillsborough Stadium; Attendance: 22,774; Referee: James Linington

25 January 2025 29	Bristol City	2–1	Blackburn Rovers	Bristol
15:00 GMT	Twine 12'; Wells 77'; O'Leary (yellow card) 90+3'	Report	Batth (yellow card) 11'; Sanderson (yellow card) 14'; Gueye (yellow card) 24'; Weimann 40'; Dolan (yellow card) 61'	Stadium: Ashton Gate; Attendance: 20,945; Referee: Matt Donohue

1 February 2025 30	Oxford United	1–1	Bristol City	Oxford
12:30 GMT	Leigh (yellow card) 19', (goal) 59'; Brannagan (yellow card) 30'; Helik (yellow card) 64'; Matos (yellow card) 84'	Report	McCrorie (yellow card) 4' (yellow-red card) 86'; Williams (red card) 31'; Sykes 65'; Bird (yellow card) 81'; O'Leary (yellow card) 90+4'	Stadium: Kassam Stadium; Attendance: 11,430; Referee: Oliver Langford
Note: Fixture was initially scheduled for a 15:00 kick-off, but was moved for live Sky Sports broadcasting.

9 February 2025 31	Bristol City	0–1	Swansea City	Bristol
12:00 GMT		Report	Tymon 55'	Stadium: Ashton Gate; Attendance: 21,554; Referee: John Busby
Note: Fixture was initially scheduled for 8 February, but was moved for live Sky Sports broadcasting.

12 February 2025 32	Bristol City	2–0	Stoke City	Bristol
19:45 GMT	Mehmeti 11', 73'; Roberts (yellow card) 40'; McGuane (yellow card) 90+2'	Report	Rose (yellow card) 24'; Gibson (yellow card) 53'	Stadium: Ashton Gate; Attendance: 18,457; Referee: James Bell

15 February 2025 33	Cardiff City	1–1	Bristol City	Cardiff
12:30 GMT	Mannsverk (yellow card) 36'; Goutas (yellow card) 42'; Salech 90'	Report	Twine (yellow card) 22'; McCrorie (yellow card) 35'; Knight 60'	Stadium: Cardiff City Stadium; Attendance: 22,433; Referee: Tony Harrington
Note: Fixture was initially scheduled for a 15:00 kick-off, but was moved for live Sky Sports broadcasting.

21 February 2025 34	Bristol City	2–1	Middlesbrough	Bristol
19:45 GMT	Earthy 72', 82'	Report	Conway 37'; Dijksteel (yellow card) 57'; Hackney (yellow card) 78'	Stadium: Ashton Gate; Attendance: 21,894; Referee: Tom Nield
Note: Fixture was initially scheduled for a 15:00 kick-off, but was moved after following agreement between the two sides.

4 March 2025 35	Millwall	0–2	Bristol City	Bermondsey
19:45 GMT		Report	Vyner 53'; Cornick 83'	Stadium: The Den; Attendance: 12,380; Referee: Matthew Donohue
Note: Fixture was initially scheduled for 1 March, but was rearranged due to Millwall's FA Cup involvements.

8 March 2025 36	Bristol City	1–1	Hull City	Bristol
15:00 GMT	Mehmeti 54' (pen.); Pring (yellow card) 58'	Report	João Pedro 13', (red card) 14'; Jones (yellow card) 53'; Alzate (yellow card) 79'; Drameh (yellow card) 90+2'	Stadium: Ashton Gate; Attendance: 21,754; Referee: James Linington

11 March 2025 37	Sheffield United	1–1	Bristol City	Sheffield
20:00 GMT	Campbell 61'; Robinson (yellow card) 90+6'	Report	Sykes 90'; Tanner (yellow card) 90+2'; Dickie (yellow card) 90+6'; Pring (yellow card) 90+8'	Stadium: Bramall Lane; Attendance: 25,070; Referee: Stephen Martin
Note: Fixture was initially scheduled for 12 March, but was moved for live Sky Sports broadcasting.

14 March 2025 38	Bristol City	2–1	Norwich City	Bristol
20:00 GMT	Sykes 6'; Wells 23'; Knight (yellow card) 34'; Williams (yellow card) 36'; O'Leary (yellow card) 90+2'; Dickie (yellow card) 90+3'	Report	Fisher (yellow card) 44'; Sainz 82'	Stadium: Ashton Gate; Attendance: 21,237; Referee: Sam Allison

29 March 2025 39	Burnley	1–0	Bristol City	Burnley
15:00 GMT	Flemming 16'	Report		Stadium: Turf Moor; Attendance: 20,523; Referee: Andrew Kitchen

5 April 2025 40	Bristol City	2–1	Watford	Bristol
15:00 BST	McCrorie 24'; Wells 29'; Earthy (yellow card) 69'	Report	Doumbia 80'; Kayembe (yellow card) 90+6'	Stadium: Ashton Gate; Attendance: 22,505; Referee: Darren Bond

8 April 2025 41	Bristol City	2–1	West Bromwich Albion	Bristol
19:45 BST	Wells 56'; Pring (yellow card) 81'; Roberts 90+6'	Report	Mowatt 62'; Molumby (red card) 89'; Bany (yellow card) 90+1'	Stadium: Ashton Gate; Attendance: 24,734; Referee: Matt Donohue

12 April 2025 42	Queens Park Rangers	1–1	Bristol City	Shepherd's Bush
15:00 BST	Colback (yellow card) 7'; Dembélé 21'; Smyth (yellow card) 68'	Report	Earthy 30'; McCrorie (yellow card) 47'	Stadium: Loftus Road; Attendance: 16,867; Referee: Leigh Doughty

18 April 2025 43	Bristol City	2–1	Sunderland	Bristol
15:00 BST	Pring (yellow card) 48'; Dickie 55'; McCrorie 76'	Report	Hume (red card) 7'; Mayenda 31'; Patterson (yellow card) 66'; Hjelde (yellow card) 80'; Anderson (yellow card) 89'	Stadium: Ashton Gate; Attendance: 25,915; Referee: Oliver Langford

21 April 2025 44	Luton Town	3–1	Bristol City	Luton
15:00 BST	Aasgaard 49'; Morris 59'; Jones 72'	Report	McCrorie (yellow card) 22'; Tanner 52'; Earthy (yellow card) 82'; Knight (yellow card) 83'	Stadium: Kenilworth Road; Attendance: 11,874; Referee: John Busby

28 April 2025 45	Leeds United	4–0	Bristol City	Leeds
20:00 BST	Tanaka 21', (yellow card) 49'; Gnonto 55'; Ramazani 82', 90+4'	Report		Stadium: Elland Road; Attendance: 36,310; Referee: James Bell
Note: Fixture was initially scheduled for 26 April, but was moved for live Sky Sports broadcasting.

3 May 2025 46	Bristol City	2–2	Preston North End	Bristol
12:30 BST	McCrorie 69', 74', (yellow card) 90+1'; Roberts (yellow card) 90+6'	Report	Ledson (yellow card) 22'; Riis Jakobsen 28'; Brady (yellow card) 32'; Kesler-Hayden (yellow card) 50'; Osmajić 60'; Mawene (yellow card) 61'	Stadium: Ashton Gate; Attendance: 24,987; Referee: James Linington
Note: Fixture was initially scheduled for a 15:00 kick-off, but all EFL Championship final matchday fixtures were moved to an earlier kick-off.

==== Play-offs ====
Bristol finished 6th in the regular season, and will face third-placed Sheffield United in the semi-finals, first leg at home then second leg away.

Win Draw Loss Fixtures

8 May 2025 Semi-finals First leg	Bristol City	0–3	Sheffield United	Bristol
20:00 BST	Dickie (red card) 45+2'	Report	Burrows 45+3' (pen.); Peck (yellow card) 64'; Brooks 73'; O'Hare 79'	Stadium: Ashton Gate; Attendance: 25,652; Referee: Oliver Langford

12 May 2025 Semi-finals Second leg	Sheffield United	3–0 (6–0 agg.)	Bristol City	Sheffield
20:00 BST	Moore 41'; Hamer 52'; O'Hare 83'	Report	Cornick (yellow card) 90'	Stadium: Bramall Lane; Attendance: 26,543; Referee: Peter Bankes

=== FA Cup ===
Bristol City entered the competition at the third round stage, and were drawn at home to Wolverhampton Wanderers.

Win Draw Loss Fixtures

11 January 2025 Third round	Bristol City	1–2	Wolverhampton Wanderers	Bristol
12:00 GMT	McGuane (yellow card) 29'; Twine 45+1'	Report	Aït-Nouri 10'; Gomes 21'	Stadium: Ashton Gate; Attendance: 23,485; Referee: Rob Jones

=== EFL Cup ===
On 27 June, the draw for the first round was made, with Bristol City being drawn at home against Coventry City.

Win Draw Loss Fixtures

13 August 2024 First round	Bristol City	0–1	Coventry City	Bristol
19:45 BST	Naismith (yellow card) 29'; Armstrong (yellow card) 90+4'	Report	Dasilva (yellow card) 7'; Simms 65'; Palmer (yellow card) 89'	Stadium: Ashton Gate; Attendance: 10,940; Referee: James Bell

== Statistics ==
=== Appearances and goals ===
Players with no appearances are not included on the list
Italics indicate a loaned in player

No.	Pos	Nat	Player	Total		Championship		FA Cup		EFL Cup		Play-offs	
No.	Pos	Nat	Player	Apps	Goals	Apps	Goals	Apps	Goals	Apps	Goals	Apps	Goals
1	GK	(Republic of Ireland) IRL	Max O'Leary	49	0	46+0	0	1+0	0	0+0	0	2+0	0
2	DF	(Scotland) SCO	Ross McCrorie	26	5	18+5	5	1+0	0	0+0	0	2+0	0
3	DF	(England) ENG	Cameron Pring	33	0	27+5	0	0+0	0	0+0	0	1+0	0
4	DF	(Scotland) SCO	Kal Naismith	7	0	2+4	0	0+0	0	1+0	0	0+0	0
6	MF	(England) ENG	Max Bird	49	1	43+3	1	0+1	0	0+0	0	2+0	0
7	FW	(Japan) JPN	Yu Hirakawa	40	2	18+19	2	0+1	0	0+0	0	1+1	0
8	MF	(England) ENG	Joe Williams	26	0	18+6	0	0+0	0	0+1	0	1+0	0
9	FW	(France) FRA	Fally Mayulu	17	2	3+12	2	1+0	0	1+0	0	0+0	0
10	FW	(England) ENG	Scott Twine	37	6	26+9	5	1+0	1	0+0	0	1+0	0
11	FW	(Albania) ALB	Anis Mehmeti	46	12	29+13	12	1+0	0	0+1	0	1+1	0
12	MF	(Republic of Ireland) IRL	Jason Knight	50	3	46+0	3	1+0	0	1+0	0	2+0	0
14	DF	(Kenya) KEN	Zak Vyner	50	1	46+0	1	1+0	0	1+0	0	2+0	0
15	DF	(Republic of Ireland) IRL	Luke McNally	27	3	26+0	3	1+0	0	0+0	0	0+0	0
16	DF	(England) ENG	Robert Dickie	37	2	35+1	2	0+0	0	0+0	0	1+0	0
17	MF	(Republic of Ireland) IRL	Mark Sykes	28	3	21+6	3	0+0	0	1+0	0	0+0	0
19	DF	(England) ENG	George Tanner	36	2	23+9	2	1+0	0	1+0	0	2+0	0
20	FW	(England) ENG	Sam Bell	23	0	0+20	0	0+0	0	1+0	0	0+2	0
21	FW	(Bermuda) BER	Nahki Wells	43	10	26+13	10	0+1	0	1+0	0	2+0	0
22	MF	(England) ENG	Taylor Gardner-Hickman	1	0	0+0	0	0+0	0	1+0	0	0+0	0
23	GK	(France) FRA	Stefan Bajic	1	0	0+0	0	0+0	0	1+0	0	0+0	0
24	DF	(England) ENG	Haydon Roberts	34	1	15+15	1	1+0	0	1+0	0	1+1	0
26	MF	(England) ENG	Josh Stokes	1	0	0+0	0	0+0	0	0+1	0	0+0	0
27	FW	(England) ENG	Harry Cornick	5	1	0+3	1	0+0	0	0+1	0	0+1	0
29	MF	(England) ENG	Marcus McGuane	24	0	11+10	0	1+0	0	0+0	0	0+2	0
30	FW	(Republic of Ireland) IRL	Sinclair Armstrong	38	3	17+19	3	0+0	0	0+1	0	0+1	0
31	MF	(England) ENG	Elijah Morrison	3	0	0+3	0	0+0	0	0+0	0	0+0	0
40	MF	(England) ENG	George Earthy	40	3	11+26	3	0+1	0	0+0	0	1+1	0
