= Joseph James (footballer) =

English footballer

Personal information
- Full name: Joseph James
- Date of birth: 27 June 2006 (age 20)
- Place of birth: Weston-super-Mare, England
- Position: Defender

Team information
- Current team: Hereford
- Number: 17

Youth career
- –2023: Bristol City

Senior career*
Years	Team	Apps	(Gls)
2023–2026	Bristol City	2	(0)
2024	→ Bath City (loan)	4	(0)
2026–	Hereford	30	(0)
- * Club domestic league appearances and goals as of 20:16, 21 November 2026 (UTC)

Joseph James (born 27 June 2006) is an English semi-professional footballer who plays as a defender for National League North club Hereford.

== Early life ==
From Weston-super-Mare, James joined Bristol City at the age of eight years-old, having also declined an offer to join Southampton. He progressed through the age-group teams at Bristol City, predominantly playing at right-back.

== Career ==
James began to be included in Bristol City first-team match day squads in October 2023. Prior to his debut he received praise from manager Nigel Pearson who predicted he had "a bright future" and noted his "composure". He made his professional debut aged 17 years-old, on 25 October 2023, in the EFL Championship at home against Ipswich Town. He made his first league start in the following fixture, away in the league against Cardiff City on 28 October 2023.

During the 2023-24 season he helped the Bristol City team make a deep run to the semifinals of the FA Youth Cup. He signed a two-year professional contract with the club in May 2024. In October 2024, he joined Bath City on a short-term loan making his league debut on 5 October 2024 against Chesham United.

On 24 February 2026, James signed for National League North club Hereford on a permanent transfer. He renewed his stay with the club in June 2025, before signing a new contract until the end of the 2027–28 season alongside his former Bristol City team mate Billy Phillips.

== Style of play ==
James is considered capable of playing as a right-back or right-sided centre half.

== Career statistics ==
As of match played 21 November 2026

Appearances and goals by club, season and competition
Club	Season	League			FA Cup		EFL Cup		Other		Total	
Club	Season	Division	Apps	Goals	Apps	Goals	Apps	Goals	Apps	Goals	Apps	Goals
Bristol City	2023–24	Championship	2	0	0	0	0	0	—		2	0
Bristol City	2024–25	Championship	0	0	0	0	0	0	—		0	0
Bristol City	Total		2	0	0	0	0	0	—		2	0
Bath City (loan)	2024–25	National League South	4	0	0	0	—		1 (Note: Appearance in FA Trophy)	0	5	0
Hereford	2025–26	National League North	14	0	—		—		—		14	0
Hereford	2026–27	National League North	16	0	1	0	—		1	0	18	0
Hereford	Total		30	0	1	0	—		1	0	32	0
Career total			36	0	1	0	0	0	2	0	39	0
