= 2026–27 Bristol City F.C. season =

English football club season

Bristol City
2026–27 season
- Owner: Steve Lansdown
- Chairman: Jon Lansdown
- Manager: Michael Skubala
- Stadium: Ashton Gate
- EFL Cup: First round

The 2026–27 season is the 129th season in the history of Bristol City Football Club and their twelfth consecutive season in the Championship. In addition to the domestic league, the club will also participate in the FA Cup and the EFL Cup.

== Managerial changes ==
Prior to the season starting, Michael Skubala was appointed as manager on a three-year contract from Lincoln City, having led them to promotion to the Championship.

== Transfers and contracts ==
=== In ===
| Date | Pos | Player | Transferred from | Fee | Ref. |
|---|---|---|---|---|---|
| 1 July 2026 | MF | (England) Sam Greenwood | (Poland) Pogoń Szczecin | £2,000,000 | |
| 1 July 2026 | FW | (Republic of Ireland) Billy O'Neill † | (Republic of Ireland) Bray Wanderers | Undisclosed | |
| 1 July 2026 | GK | (England) Sam Tickle | (England) Wigan Athletic | Undisclosed | |
| 1 July 2026 | MF | (Netherlands) Gibson Yah | (Netherlands) Volendam | Undisclosed | |
| 3 July 2026 | FW | (England) Jed Wallace | (England) West Bromwich Albion | Free | |
| 10 July 2026 | DF | (Romania) Lisav Eissat | (Israel) Maccabi Haifa | £2,130,000 | |
| 11 July 2026 | GK | (England) Bradley Collins | (England) Coventry City | Free | |
| 20 July 2026 | FW | (Switzerland) Lorent Tolaj | (England) Plymouth Argyle | £4,000,000 | |
| 4 August 2026 | FW | (England) Dom Ballard | (England) Leyton Orient | £5,000,000 | |
| 24 August 2026 | FW | (England) Elijah Adebayo | (England) Luton Town | Free | |

- † – Signed initially for the Under-21s

=== Out ===
| Date | Pos | Player | Transferred to | Fee | Ref. |
|---|---|---|---|---|---|
| 30 June 2026 | DF | (England) Derrick Ababio | Free agent | Released | |
| 30 June 2026 | DF | (Wales) Zack Ali | (England) Frome Town | Free (Note: Following his release, Ali joined Frome Town as a free agent on 1 July.) | |
| 30 June 2026 | MF | (England) Tom Chaplin | (England) Clevedon Town | Free (Note: Following his release, Chaplin joined Clevedon Town as a free agent on 19 July.) | |
| 30 June 2026 | GK | (England) Ben Clark | Free agent | Released | |
| 30 June 2026 | FW | (England) Harry Cornick | (England) AFC Wimbledon | Free (Note: Following his release, Cornick joined AFC Wimbledon as a free agent on 25 August.) | |
| 30 June 2026 | DF | (England) Max Davies | Free agent | Released | |
| 30 June 2026 | FW | (England) Trayvion Jackson | (England) Bath City | Free (Note: Following his release, Jackson joined Clevedon Town as a free agent on 30 July.) | |
| 30 June 2026 | MF | (Egypt) Sam Morsy | (England) Blackburn Rovers | Free (Note: Following his release, Morsy joined Blackburn Rovers as a free agent on 10 August.) | |
| 30 June 2026 | FW | (England) Billy Phillips | (England) Hereford | Free (Note: Following his release, Phillips joined Hereford as a free agent on 1 July.) | |
| 30 June 2026 | MF | (Republic of Ireland) Mark Sykes | (England) Millwall | Free (Note: Following his release, Sykes joined Millwall as a free agent on 9 July.) | |
| 30 June 2026 | DF | (England) Archie Taylor | (England) Weston-super-Mare | Free (Note: Following his release, Taylor joined Weston-super-Mare as a free agent on 3 July.) | |
| 30 June 2026 | DF | (England) Cavalli Walker | Free agent | Released | |
| 1 July 2026 | FW | (Republic of Ireland) Sinclair Armstrong | (Turkey) Göztepe | £2,160,000 | |
| 1 July 2026 | DF | (Scotland) Ross McCrorie | (Scotland) Rangers | £900,000 | |
| 11 July 2026 | GK | (England) Joe Lumley | (England) Sheffield Wednesday | Free | |
| 14 August 2026 | MF | (England) Max Bird | (England) Birmingham City | Undisclosed | |
| 1 September 2026 | FW | (Denmark) Emil Riis Jakobsen | (England) Leicester City | Undisclosed | |
| 4 September 2026 | FW | (England) Olly Thomas | (Scotland) Dunfermline Athletic | Free transfer | |

=== Loaned in ===
| Date | Pos | Player | Loaned from | Loaned until | Ref. |
|---|---|---|---|---|---|
| 11 August 2026 | DF | (Trinidad and Tobago) Rio Cardines | (England) Crystal Palace | End of Season | |
| 2 September 2026 | CDM | (Belgium) Brian De Keersmaecker | (England) Oxford United | End of Season (Note: Option to make the move permanent.) | |

=== Loaned out ===
| Date | Pos. | Player | Loaned to | Loaned until | Ref. |
|---|---|---|---|---|---|
| 6 July 2026 | GK | (Wales) Joe Duncan | (England) Southend United | End of Season | |
| 10 July 2026 | MF | (England) Josh Stokes | (England) Reading | End of Season | |
| 22 July 2026 | GK | (England) Freddie Godden | (England) Taunton Town | End of Season | |
| 31 July 2026 | DF | (Canada) Jamie Knight-Lebel | (Scotland) Motherwell | End of Season | |
| 6 August 2026 | MF | (England) Louie Derrick | (England) Weston-super-Mare | 3 September 2026 | |
| 12 August 2026 | DF | (England) Jack Hooper | (Wales) Cardiff Met | End of Season | |
| 14 August 2026 | MF | (England) Harry Hogg | (England) Chippenham Town | 9 September 2026 | |
| 15 August 2026 | FW | (England) Luke Skinner | (England) Carlisle United | 7 September 2026 | |
| 21 August 2026 | MF | (Republic of Ireland) Adam Murphy | (England) Fleetwood Town | 2 January 2027 | |
| 21 August 2026 | GK | (England) Jack Witchard | (England) Chippenham Town | End of Season (Note: On 4 November Witchard's initial three-month loan at Chippenham Town was extended until end of the season.) | |
| 28 August 2026 | FW | (England) Excellent Ikpeama | (England) AFC Totton | 26 September 2026 | |
| 12 September 2026 | FW | (England) Luke Skinner | (England) Weston-super-Mare | 2 January 2027 | |
| 26 September 2026 | FW | (Italy) Ephraim Yeboah | (England) Southend United | 8 October 2026 | |
| 9 October 2026 | FW | (England) Kaylan Appleton-Bennett | (England) Brislington | 7 November 2026 | |
| 9 October 2026 | GK | (England) Hugo Dali-Kemmery | (England) Brislington | 7 November 2026 | |
| 23 October 2026 | DF | (England) Seb Naylor | (England) Yeovil Town | 3 January 2027 | |
| 13 November 2026 | MF | (United States) Desmond Kumih-Barimah | (England) Bristol Manor Farm | 13 December 2026 | |
| 17 November 2026 | GK | (England) Hugo Dali-Kemmery | (England) Hungerford Town | 17 December 2026 | |
| 18 November 2026 | MF | (England) Harry Hogg | (England) Frome Town | 18 December 2026 | |

=== New Contracts ===
| Date | Pos | Player | Contracted until | Ref. |
|---|---|---|---|---|
| 19 June 2026 | FW | (England) Sam Bell | 30 June 2029 | |
| 28 September 2026 | DF | (England) Elijah Morrison | 30 June 2028 | |
| 30 September 2026 | GK | (England) Freddie Godden | 30 June 2029 | |

== Pre-season and friendlies ==
On 18 May, Bristol City announced their first pre-season friendly, against Plymouth Argyle. Two days later, an away fixture against Forest Green Rovers was added. A third was later added against Swindon Town. On 3 June, a fourth trip during pre-season was announced against Exeter City. Also added to the pre-season schedule was a training camp in Alicante along with a fixture against Stockport County. On 25 June, a home friendly against Newcastle United was announced. A behind-closed-doors fixture against Newport County was also added.

On 25 September, the club announced a mid-season friendly against Crystal Palace during the September–October international break.

Win Draw Loss Fixtures

| 17 July 2026 Friendly | Bristol City | 0–2 | Stockport County | San Pedro del Pinatar, Spain |
| 11:30 CEST | | Report | Sidibeh 22'; Fevrier 83' | Stadium: Pinatar Arena |

| 21 July 2026 Friendly | Bristol City | 0–0 | Newport County | Failand |
| 12:00 BST | | Report | | Stadium: Robins High Performance Centre |

| 25 July 2026 Friendly | Swindon Town | 1–3 | Bristol City | Swindon |
| 13:00 BST | Drinan 16' | Report | Tolaj 57', 76'; Wallace 78' | Stadium: County Ground |
Note: Fixture was initially scheduled for a 15:00 kick-off, but was brought forward on request from local authorities.

| 29 July 2026 Friendly | Forest Green Rovers | 3-2 | Bristol City | Nailsworth |
| 19:00 BST | | Report | | Stadium: The New Lawn; Attendance: 1,173 |

| 29 July 2026 Friendly | Bristol City | 4–1 | Newcastle United | Ashton Gate |
| 19:30 BST | Greenwood 26'; Tolaj 29'; Bird 50'; Botman 81' (o.g.) | Report | Barnes 78' | Stadium: Ashton Gate Stadium; Attendance: 21,509 (3,354 away) |

| 1 August 2026 Friendly | Plymouth Argyle | 0–0 | Bristol City | Milehouse |
| 14:00 BST | Amaechi (yellow card) 61'; Ross (yellow card) 88' | Report | | Stadium: Home Park |

| 1 August 2026 Friendly | Exeter City | 1–1 | Bristol City | Exeter |
| 17:30 BST | Cole 45' | | Horvat 90+8' | Stadium: St James Park |

| 3 October 2026 Friendly | Crystal Palace | 0–2 | Bristol City | Selhurst |
| 12:25 BST | | Report | McNally 6'; Pring (yellow card) 39'; Twine 50' | Stadium: Selhurst Park |

== Competitions ==
=== Overall record ===
| Competition | First match | Last match | Starting round | Final position | Record | | | | | | | |
| Competition | First match | Last match | Starting round | Final position | Pld | W | D | L | GF | GA | GD | Win % |
|---|---|---|---|---|---|---|---|---|---|---|---|---|
| Championship | 15 August 2026 | | Matchday 1 | | 14 | 5 | 3 | 6 | 16 | 19 | −3 | 35.71 |
| FA Cup | | | Third round | | 0 | 0 | 0 | 0 | 0 | 0 | +0 | — |
| EFL Cup | 6 August 2026 | | First round | First round | 1 | 0 | 0 | 1 | 0 | 1 | −1 | 0.00 |
| Total | | | | | 15 | 5 | 3 | 7 | 16 | 20 | −4 | 33.33 |

Last updated: 17 October 2026
Source: Soccerway

=== Championship ===
==== League table ====
| Pos | Team | Pld | W | D | L | GF | GA | GD | Pts |
|---|---|---|---|---|---|---|---|---|---|
| 16 | Millwall | 16 | 5 | 3 | 8 | 23 | 28 | −5 | 18 |
| 17 | Bolton Wanderers | 16 | 5 | 3 | 8 | 21 | 30 | −9 | 18 |
| 18 | Bristol City | 16 | 5 | 3 | 8 | 16 | 26 | −10 | 18 |
| 19 | Charlton Athletic | 16 | 4 | 5 | 7 | 14 | 25 | −11 | 17 |
| 20 | Lincoln City | 16 | 4 | 3 | 9 | 15 | 27 | −12 | 15 |

Updated to match(es) played on 21 November 2026. Source: EFL Official Website
Rules for classification: 1) Points; 2) Goal difference; 3) Number of goals scored; 4) Head-to-head results; 5) Wins; 6) Away goals; 7) Penalty points (sec 9.5); 8) Number of 12-point sending off offences; 9) Play-off (only if needed to determine promotion/relegation)

==== Results summary ====
| Overall | | | | | | | | Home | | | | | | Away | | | | | |
| Pld | W | D | L | GF | GA | GD | Pts | W | D | L | GF | GA | GD | W | D | L | GF | GA | GD |
|---|---|---|---|---|---|---|---|---|---|---|---|---|---|---|---|---|---|---|---|
| 16 | 5 | 3 | 8 | 16 | 26 | −10 | 18 | 2 | 0 | 6 | 4 | 13 | −9 | 3 | 3 | 2 | 12 | 13 | −1 |

Last updated: 21 November 2026.
Source: Soccerway

==== Results by round ====
| Round | 1 | 2 | 3 | 4 | 5 | 7 | 6^{1} | 8 | 9 | 10 | 11 | 12 | 13 | 14 | 15 | 16 | 17 | 18 | 19 | 20 | 21 | 22 | 23 | 24 | 25 | 26 | 27 | 28 | 29 | 30 | 31 | 32 | 33 |
|---|---|---|---|---|---|---|---|---|---|---|---|---|---|---|---|---|---|---|---|---|---|---|---|---|---|---|---|---|---|---|---|---|---|
| Ground | H | A | H | A | A | A | H | H | A | H | H | A | A | H | H | A | H | A | H | A | A | H | A | H | H | A | H | A | A | H | H | A | A |
| Result | L | D | W | W | W | L | L | W | D | L | L | D | W | L | L | L | | | | | | | | | | | | | | | | | |
| Position | 23 | 19 | 12 | 5 | 4 | 11 | 13 | 8 | 10 | 12 | 16 | 14 | 14 | 15 | 17 | 18 | | | | | | | | | | | | | | | | | |
| Points | 0 | 1 | 4 | 7 | 10 | 10 | 10 | 13 | 14 | 14 | 14 | 15 | 18 | 18 | 18 | 18 | | | | | | | | | | | | | | | | | |

Source: EFL
A = Away; H = Home; W = Win; D = Draw; L = Loss; P = Postponed
Notes:
- ^{1} Matchday 6 (vs. Lincoln City) was rescheduled due to opposition in EFL Cup involvements.

==== Matches ====
On 25 June, the Championship fixtures were revealed.

Win Draw Loss Fixtures

| 15 August 2026 1 | Bristol City | 0–2 | Millwall | Ashton Gate |
| 15:00 BST | Randell (yellow card) 23' (yellow-red card) 36' | Report | Coburn (yellow card) 15', (goal) 41', 50'; Metcalfe (yellow card) 45' | Stadium: Ashton Gate Stadium; Attendance: 24,168; Referee: Lewis Smith |

| 22 August 2026 2 | Birmingham City | 2–2 | Bristol City | Bordesley |
| 12:30 BST | Osayi-Samuel (yellow card) 32'; Tickle 42' (o.g.); Roberts (yellow card) 78'; Gray 90+5' (pen.) | Report | Twine 33'; Ballard 86'; Knight (yellow card) 90+6' | Stadium: St Andrew's @ Knighthead Park; Referee: Will Finnie |
Note: Fixture was initially scheduled for a 15:00 kick-off, but was brought forward for live Sky Sports.

| 29 August 2026 3 | Bristol City | 2–1 | Portsmouth | Ashton Gate |
| 15:00 BST | Tolaj 31'; Cardines (yellow card) 49'; Knight 56', (yellow card) 67'; Dickie (yellow card) 77' | | Milovanović 90+5' (pen.) | Stadium: Ashton Gate Stadium; Attendance: 24,134; Referee: James Bell |

| 1 September 2026 4 | Preston North End | 1–3 | Bristol City | Preston |
| 19:45 BST | Thompson (yellow card) 9'; Wiley 51'; Lindsay (yellow card) 83' | | Twine 4'; Eissat 79'; Ballard 86' | Stadium: Deepdale; Attendance: 13,028; Referee: Ruebyn Ricardo |

| 5 September 2026 5 | Burnley | 1–2 | Bristol City | Burnley |
| 15:00 BST | Ekdal (yellow card) 45+2'; Ramsey 56'; Walker (yellow card) 83'; Broja (yellow card) 90+4' | | Dickie 82'; Hirakawa 90+1' | Stadium: Turf Moor; Referee: Gavin Ward |

| 12 September 2026 7 | Southampton | 4–1 | Bristol City | Southampton |
| 15:00 BST | Larin 38', 61'; Matsuki 82'; Azaz 85' | Report | Eissat (yellow card) 54'; Tolaj 66'; Greenwood (yellow card) 89' | Stadium: St Mary's Stadium; Attendance: 30,132; Referee: Samuel Allison |

| 15 September 2026 6 | Bristol City | 0–1 | Lincoln City | Ashton Gate |
| 19:45 BST | Eissat (yellow card) 28'; Tolaj (yellow card) 41' | Report | House (yellow card) 14'; Elerewe (yellow card) 37'; Draper (yellow card) 45', (goal) 53'; Towler (yellow card) 68'; Wickens (yellow card) 69' | Stadium: Ashton Gate Stadium; Attendance: 18,666; Referee: Tim Robinson |
Note: Fixture was initially scheduled for 8 September, but was pushed back a week due to Lincoln in EFL Cup involvements.

| 18 September 2026 8 | Bristol City | 1–0 | Watford | Ashton Gate |
| 20:00 BST | Ballard 31'; Williams (yellow card) 54'; Knight (yellow card) 54' | | Doumbia (yellow card) 21'; Nabizada (yellow card) 25'; Mlačić (yellow card) 54'; Kayembe (yellow card) 54'; Pollock (yellow card) 81' | Stadium: Ashton Gate Stadium; Attendance: 20,906; Referee: Oliver Langford |
Note: Fixture was initially scheduled for 19 September, but was rescheduled for live Sky Sports.

| 10 October 2026 9 | Charlton Athletic | 1–1 | Bristol City | Charlton |
| 12:30 BST | Grant 8'; Koumetio (yellow card) 69'; Mesík (yellow card) 90+2' | Report | Twine 27' (pen.); Adebayo (yellow card) 90+2' | Stadium: The Valley; Attendance: 20,481 (2,855 away); Referee: Tom Reeves |
Note: Fixture was initially scheduled for a 15:00 kick-off, but was brought forward for live Sky Sports broadcasting.

| 13 October 2026 10 | Bristol City | 0–1 | Blackburn Rovers | Ashton Gate |
| 19:45 BST | | | Afolayan 38' | Stadium: Ashton Gate Stadium; Attendance: 18,712; Referee: David Webb |

| 17 October 2026 11 | Bristol City | 0–1 | Sheffield United | Ashton Gate |
| 15:00 BST | De Keersmaecker (yellow card) 90+6' | | Arblaster 5'; Bamford (yellow card) 90+10' | Stadium: Ashton Gate Stadium; Attendance: 22,016; Referee: Ben Speedie |

| 24 October 2026 12 | Stoke City | 0–0 | Bristol City | Stoke-on-Trent |
| 15:00 BST | Soumaré (yellow card) 31' | Report | McNally (yellow card) 43'; Knight (yellow card) 71' | Stadium: bet365 Stadium; Attendance: 22,390; Referee: James Bell |

| 31 October 2026 13 | Bolton Wanderers | 2–3 | Bristol City | Horwich |
| 15:00 GMT | Sheehan 16', (yellow card) 30'; Dalby 57' | Report | Williams (yellow card) 11'; Ballard 13'; Bell 84'; Twine 90+3' | Stadium: Toughsheet Community Stadium; Attendance: 21,706; Referee: Bobby Madley |

| 4 November 2026 14 | Bristol City | 1–2 | Wolverhampton Wanderers | Ashton Gate |
| 20:00 GMT | Twine 34'; Pring (yellow card) 65'; McNally (yellow card) 88' | Report | Bellegarde (yellow card) 65'; Neave 82' 89' | Stadium: Ashton Gate Stadium; Attendance: 23,569; Referee: Tom Nield |
Note: Fixture was initially scheduled for a 19:45 kick-off, but was pushed back for live Sky Sports broadcasting.

| 7 November 2026 15 | Bristol City | 0–5 | Norwich City | Ashton Gate |
| 12:30 GMT | | Report | Maghoma 22'; Darling 53'; Brooks 56'; Makama 70'; Kvistgaarden 80' (pen.) | Stadium: Ashton Gate Stadium; Attendance: 20,758 (2,003 away); Referee: Lewis Smith |
Note: Fixture was initially scheduled for a 15:00 kick-off, but was brought forward for live Sky Sports broadcasting.

| 21 November 2026 16 | Middlesbrough | 2–0 | Bristol City | Middlesbrough |
| 15:00 GMT | Malanda 40'; Morris (yellow card) 42'; Strelec 54'; Conway (yellow card) 79' | Report | | Stadium: Riverside Stadium; Attendance: 29,316; Referee: Ruebyn Ricardo |

| 24 November 2026 17 | Bristol City | v | Wrexham | Ashton Gate |
| 19:45 GMT | | | | Stadium: Ashton Gate Stadium |

| 28 November 2026 18 | West Bromwich Albion | v | Bristol City | West Bromwich |
| 15:00 GMT | | | | Stadium: The Hawthorns |

| 5 December 2026 19 | Bristol City | v | Swansea City | Ashton Gate |
| 12:30 GMT | | | | Stadium: Ashton Gate Stadium |
Note: Fixture was initially scheduled for a 15:00 kick-off, but was brought forward for live Sky Sports broadcasting.

| 9 December 2026 20 | Derby County | v | Bristol City | Derby |
| 19:45 GMT | | | | Stadium: Pride Park Stadium |

| 12 December 2026 21 | West Ham United | v | Bristol City | Stratford |
| 15:00 GMT | | | | Stadium: London Stadium |

| 19 December 2026 22 | Bristol City | v | Cardiff City | Ashton Gate |
| 12:30 GMT | | | | Stadium: Ashton Gate Stadium |
Note: Fixture was initially scheduled for a 15:00 kick-off, but was brought forward for live Sky Sports broadcasting.

| 26 December 2026 23 | Queens Park Rangers | v | Bristol City | Shepherd's Bush |
| 15:00 GMT | | | | Stadium: MATRADE Loftus Road |

| 29 December 2026 24 | Bristol City | v | Stoke City | Ashton Gate |
| 19:45 GMT | | | | Stadium: Ashton Gate Stadium |

| 1 January 2027 25 | Bristol City | v | West Ham United | Ashton Gate |
| 15:00 GMT | | | | Stadium: Ashton Gate Stadium |

| 16 January 2027 26 | Sheffield United | v | Bristol City | Sheffield |
| 15:00 GMT | | | | Stadium: Bramall Lane |

| 23 January 2027 27 | Bristol City | v | Bolton Wanderers | Ashton Gate |
| 15:00 GMT | | | | Stadium: Ashton Gate Stadium |

| 27 January 2027 28 | Wolverhampton Wanderers | v | Bristol City | Wolverhampton |
| 19:45 GMT | | | | Stadium: Molineux Stadium |

| 31 January 2027 29 | Norwich City | v | Bristol City | Norwich |
| 12:00 GMT | | | | Stadium: Carrow Road |
Note: Fixture was initially scheduled for 30 January, but was pushed back a day for live Sky Sports broadcasting.

| 5 February 2027 30 | Bristol City | v | Middlesbrough | Ashton Gate |
| 20:00 GMT | | | | Stadium: Ashton Gate Stadium |
Note: Fixture was initially scheduled for 6 February, but was brought forward to the night prior for live Sky Sports broadcasting.

| 13 February 2027 31 | Bristol City | v | Southampton | Ashton Gate |
| 12:30 GMT | | | | Stadium: Ashton Gate Stadium |
Note: Fixture was initially scheduled for a 15:00 kick-off, but was brought forward for live Sky Sports broadcasting.

| 16 February 2027 32 | Blackburn Rovers | v | Bristol City | Blackburn |
| 20:00 GMT | | | | Stadium: Ewood Park |
Note: Fixture was initially scheduled for a 19:45 kick-off, but was pushed back for live Sky Sports broadcasting.

| 20 February 2027 33 | Watford | v | Bristol City | Watford |
| 12:30 GMT | | | | Stadium: Vicarage Road |
Note: Fixture was initially scheduled for a 15:00 kick-off, but was brought forward for live Sky Sports broadcasting.

| 27 February 2027 34 | Bristol City | v | Charlton Athletic | Ashton Gate |
| 12:30 GMT | | | | Stadium: Ashton Gate Stadium |
Note: Fixture was initially scheduled for a 15:00 kick-off, but was brought forward for live Sky Sports broadcasting.

| 2 March 2027 35 | Bristol City | v | Birmingham City | Ashton Gate |
| 20:00 GMT | | | | Stadium: Ashton Gate Stadium |
Note: Fixture was initially scheduled for a 19:45 kick-off, but was pushed back for live Sky Sports broadcasting.

=== FA Cup ===
Win Draw Loss Fixtures

=== EFL Cup ===
City were drawn at home to Walsall in the first round.

Win Draw Loss Fixtures

| 6 August 2026 First round | Bristol City | 0–1 | Walsall | Ashton Gate |
| 19:45 BST | | Report | Pressley 47'; Moore (yellow card) 56'; Sprangler (yellow card) 67'; Browne (yellow card) 90+2' | Stadium: Ashton Gate Stadium; Attendance: 9,992; Referee: Jacob Miles |
Note: Fixture was initially scheduled for 7 August, but was brought forward 24-hours to avoid a clash with the Bristol International Balloon Fiesta.

== Statistics ==
=== Appearances and goals ===
As of match played 21 November 2026

Players with no appearances are not included on the list, italics indicate a loaned in player

| No. | Pos | Nat | Player | Total | | Championship | | FA Cup | | EFL Cup | |
| No. | Pos | Nat | Player | Apps | Goals | Apps | Goals | Apps | Goals | Apps | Goals |
|---|---|---|---|---|---|---|---|---|---|---|---|
| 1 | GK | (England) ENG | Sam Tickle | 12 | 0 | 11+0 | 0 | 0+0 | 0 | 1+0 | 0 |
| 2 | DF | (Romania) ROU | Lisav Eissat | 14 | 1 | 12+1 | 1 | 0+0 | 0 | 1+0 | 0 |
| 3 | DF | (England) ENG | Cameron Pring | 15 | 0 | 9+5 | 0 | 0+0 | 0 | 1+0 | 0 |
| 4 | MF | (England) ENG | Adam Randell | 10 | 0 | 6+3 | 0 | 0+0 | 0 | 1+0 | 0 |
| 5 | DF | (England) ENG | Robert Atkinson | 8 | 0 | 6+2 | 0 | 0+0 | 0 | 0+0 | 0 |
| 6 | MF | (Belgium) BEL | Brian De Keersmaecker | 7 | 0 | 3+4 | 0 | 0+0 | 0 | 0+0 | 0 |
| 7 | FW | (Japan) JPN | Yū Hirakawa | 15 | 1 | 9+5 | 1 | 0+0 | 0 | 0+1 | 0 |
| 8 | MF | (England) ENG | Joe Williams | 12 | 0 | 9+2 | 0 | 0+0 | 0 | 0+1 | 0 |
| 9 | FW | (Switzerland) SUI | Lorent Tolaj | 14 | 2 | 12+1 | 2 | 0+0 | 0 | 1+0 | 0 |
| 10 | MF | (England) ENG | Scott Twine | 14 | 5 | 11+2 | 5 | 0+0 | 0 | 0+1 | 0 |
| 11 | FW | (England) ENG | Sam Bell | 7 | 1 | 1+6 | 1 | 0+0 | 0 | 0+0 | 0 |
| 12 | MF | (Republic of Ireland) IRL | Jason Knight | 17 | 1 | 16+0 | 1 | 0+0 | 0 | 1+0 | 0 |
| 14 | MF | (Slovenia) SLO | Tomi Horvat | 7 | 0 | 0+7 | 0 | 0+0 | 0 | 0+0 | 0 |
| 15 | DF | (Republic of Ireland) IRL | Luke McNally | 5 | 0 | 5+0 | 0 | 0+0 | 0 | 0+0 | 0 |
| 16 | DF | (England) ENG | Robert Dickie | 10 | 1 | 9+0 | 1 | 0+0 | 0 | 1+0 | 0 |
| 17 | FW | (England) ENG | Jed Wallace | 15 | 0 | 5+9 | 0 | 0+0 | 0 | 1+0 | 0 |
| 19 | DF | (England) ENG | George Tanner | 15 | 0 | 13+1 | 0 | 0+0 | 0 | 1+0 | 0 |
| 20 | MF | (England) ENG | Sam Greenwood | 12 | 0 | 5+6 | 0 | 0+0 | 0 | 1+0 | 0 |
| 21 | DF | (Trinidad and Tobago) TTO | Rio Cardines | 16 | 0 | 14+2 | 0 | 0+0 | 0 | 0+0 | 0 |
| 23 | FW | (England) ENG | Dom Ballard | 17 | 4 | 8+8 | 4 | 0+0 | 0 | 0+1 | 0 |
| 27 | MF | (Netherlands) NED | Gibson Yah | 10 | 0 | 5+5 | 0 | 0+0 | 0 | 0+0 | 0 |
| 38 | DF | (Sweden) SWE | Noah Eile | 3 | 0 | 2+1 | 0 | 0+0 | 0 | 0+0 | 0 |
| 40 | GK | (England) ENG | Brad Collins | 5 | 0 | 5+0 | 0 | 0+0 | 0 | 0+0 | 0 |
| 45 | FW | (England) ENG | Elijah Adebayo | 7 | 0 | 0+7 | 0 | 0+0 | 0 | 0+0 | 0 |
Players who featured but departed the club permanently during the season:
| 6 | MF | (England) ENG | Max Bird | 1 | 0 | 0+0 | 0 | 0+0 | 0 | 1+0 | 0 |
| 18 | FW | (Denmark) DEN | Emil Riis Jakobsen | 2 | 0 | 0+1 | 0 | 0+0 | 0 | 0+1 | 0 |

=== Disciplinary record ===
As of match played 21 November 2026

Includes all competitive matches. The list is sorted by squad number when disciplinary points / points per card / number of cards are equal. Players with no cards not included in the list.

| Rank | No. | Pos. | Nat. | Name | Championship | | | FA Cup | | | EFL Cup | | | Total | | |
| Rank | No. | Pos. | Nat. | Name | Yellow card | Second yellow card | Red card | Yellow card | Second yellow card | Red card | Yellow card | Second yellow card | Red card | Yellow card | Second yellow card | Red card |
|---|---|---|---|---|---|---|---|---|---|---|---|---|---|---|---|---|
| 1 | 12 | CM | (Republic of Ireland) | Jason Knight | 3 | 0 | 0 | 0 | 0 | 0 | 0 | 0 | 0 | 3 | 0 | 0 |
| 2 | 2 | CB | (Romania) | Lisav Eissat | 2 | 0 | 0 | 0 | 0 | 0 | 0 | 0 | 0 | 2 | 0 | 0 |
| 2 | 4 | CDM | (England) | Adam Randell | 0 | 1 | 0 | 0 | 0 | 0 | 0 | 0 | 0 | 0 | 1 | 0 |
| 2 | 8 | CM | (England) | Joe Williams | 2 | 0 | 0 | 0 | 0 | 0 | 0 | 0 | 0 | 2 | 0 | 0 |
| 2 | 15 | CB | (Republic of Ireland) | Luke McNally | 2 | 0 | 0 | 0 | 0 | 0 | 0 | 0 | 0 | 2 | 0 | 0 |
| 2 | 16 | CB | (England) | Robert Dickie | 2 | 0 | 0 | 0 | 0 | 0 | 0 | 0 | 0 | 2 | 0 | 0 |
| 7 | 3 | LB | (England) | Cameron Pring | 1 | 0 | 0 | 0 | 0 | 0 | 0 | 0 | 0 | 1 | 0 | 0 |
| 7 | 6 | CDM | (Belgium) | Brian De Keersmaecker | 1 | 0 | 0 | 0 | 0 | 0 | 0 | 0 | 0 | 1 | 0 | 0 |
| 7 | 9 | CF | (Switzerland) | Lorent Tolaj | 1 | 0 | 0 | 0 | 0 | 0 | 0 | 0 | 0 | 1 | 0 | 0 |
| 7 | 20 | CAM | (England) | Sam Greenwood | 1 | 0 | 0 | 0 | 0 | 0 | 0 | 0 | 0 | 1 | 0 | 0 |
| 7 | 21 | LB | (Trinidad and Tobago) | Rio Cardines | 1 | 0 | 0 | 0 | 0 | 0 | 0 | 0 | 0 | 1 | 0 | 0 |
| 7 | 23 | CF | (England) | Dom Ballard | 1 | 0 | 0 | 0 | 0 | 0 | 0 | 0 | 0 | 1 | 0 | 0 |
| 7 | 45 | CF | (England) | Elijah Adebayo | 1 | 0 | 0 | 0 | 0 | 0 | 0 | 0 | 0 | 1 | 0 | 0 |
| Total | | | | | 18 | 1 | 0 | 0 | 0 | 0 | 0 | 0 | 0 | 18 | 1 | 0 |

== Awards ==
=== Player Awards ===
==== EFL Championship Player of the Month ====
| August | Player | Result | Ref. |
|---|---|---|---|
| September | (Trinidad and Tobago) Rio Cardines | Nominated | |

==== EFL Championship Goal of the Month ====
| August | Player | Opposition | Result | Ref. |
|---|---|---|---|---|
| August | (England) Dom Ballard | v. Birmingham City | Won | |
