= Taylor Gardner-Hickman =

English footballer (born 2001)

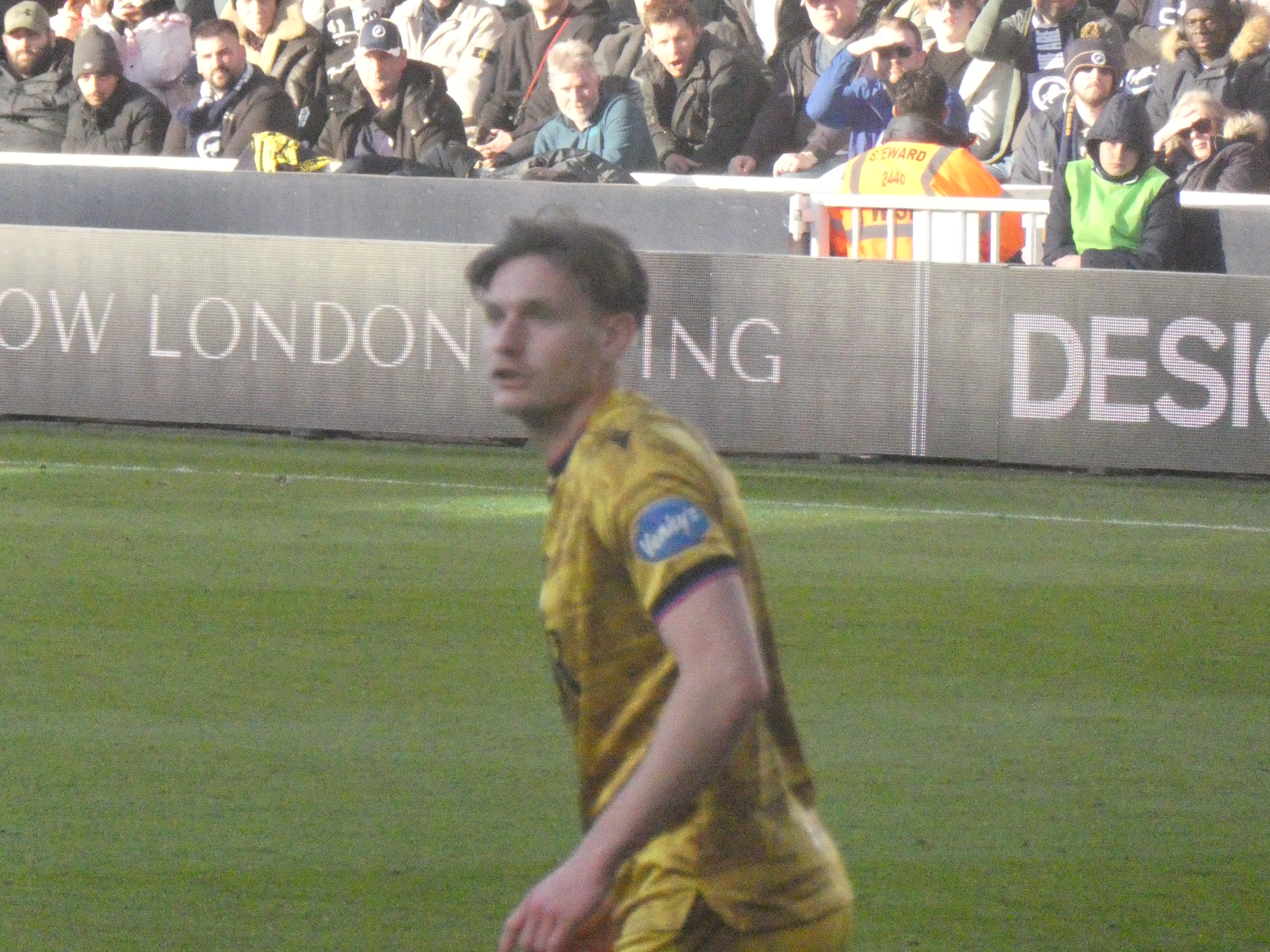
- Gardner-Hickman playing for Blackburn Rovers in 2026.

Personal information
- Full name: Taylor Edward Gardner-Hickman
- Date of birth: 30 December 2001 (age 24)
- Place of birth: Telford, England
- Height: 6 ft 2 in (1.88 m)
- Position: Midfielder

Team information
- Current team: Birmingham City
- Number: 19

Youth career
- 2009–2021: West Bromwich Albion

Senior career*
Years	Team	Apps	(Gls)
2021–2024	West Bromwich Albion	52	(2)
2023–2024	→ Bristol City (loan)	23	(1)
2024–2025	Bristol City	13	(0)
2024–2025	→ Birmingham City (loan)	33	(3)
2025–	Birmingham City	3	(0)
2025–2026	→ Blackburn Rovers (loan)	30	(0)

International career
2022	England U20	2	(0)
- * Club domestic league appearances and goals as of 14:22, 2 May 2026 (UTC)

Taylor Edward Gardner-Hickman (born 30 December 2001) is an English professional footballer who plays as a midfielder for EFL Championship club Birmingham City. He began his career with West Bromwich Albion and later played for Bristol City. He has represented England at under-20 level.

== Early and personal life ==
Gardner-Hickman was born in Telford. He is of Irish descent through his grandmother and great-grandparents.

== Club career ==
=== West Bromwich Albion ===
Having joined West Bromwich Albion's academy aged 7, Gardner-Hickman progressed through the club's youth academy. Gardner-Hickman made three appearances for the club's under-21 side in the 2020–21 EFL Trophy, scoring one goal. He was named in a West Bromwich Albion matchday squad for the first time on 9 May 2021 for a 3–1 defeat to Arsenal. He made his debut for the club on 25 August 2021, starting in a 6–0 EFL Cup second round defeat to Arsenal. He made his league debut for the club on 3 November 2021, starting at right wing-back as a replacement for the suspended Darnell Furlong in a 1–0 win over Hull City. On 30 December 2021, Gardner-Hickman signed a new four-and-a-half-year deal at the club. He scored his first senior goal on 15 October 2022 in a 2–0 win at Reading.

=== Bristol City ===
On 22 August 2023, Hickman joined Bristol City on a season long loan with an option to buy.

In December 2023, Gardner-Hickman was voted Bristol City's November Player of the Month, receiving 49% of the votes.

On 15 January 2024, the club announced that they had exercised their option to buy and Gardner-Hickman had joined the club on a three-and-a-half-year contract.

=== Birmingham City ===
Gardner-Hickman joined recently relegated League One club Birmingham City on 23 August 2024 on loan for the rest of the season. The deal included an option to buy the player at the end of the season, which Birmingham confirmed on 3 February 2025 that they would be taking up.

On 8 April 2025, he scored the winning goal against Peterborough United which confirmed Birmingham's promotion back to the Championship with six games still to play.

=== Blackburn Rovers ===
On 1 September 2025, Gardner-Hickman joined Blackburn Rovers on loan for the 2025–26 season with an option to buy at the end of the season. On 19 May it was announced that Gardner-Hickman would return to Birmingham following the conclusion of his loan spell.

== International career ==
On 25 March 2022, Gardner-Hickman made his England U20 debut in a 2–0 defeat to Poland in Bielsko-Biała. Four days later he played in a 3–1 win over Germany at the Colchester Community Stadium.

== Style of play ==
Gardner-Hickman is primarily a right-sided player and is capable of playing at full-back, as a wide midfielder or in central midfield. In March 2022, manager Steve Bruce stated that he "believes his best position is right-back".

== Career statistics ==
As of match played 2 May 2026

Appearances and goals by club, season and competition
Club	Season	League			FA Cup		League Cup		Other		Total	
Club	Season	Division	Apps	Goals	Apps	Goals	Apps	Goals	Apps	Goals	Apps	Goals
West Bromwich Albion U21	2020–21	—			—		—		3 (Note: Appearances in EFL Trophy)	1	3	1
West Bromwich Albion	2021–22	Championship	19	0	1	0	1	0	—		21	0
West Bromwich Albion	2022–23	Championship	31	2	3	0	2	0	—		36	2
West Bromwich Albion	2023–24	Championship	2	0	—		1	0	—		3	0
West Bromwich Albion	Total		52	2	4	0	4	0	—		60	2
Bristol City (loan)	2023–24	Championship	23	1	1	0	—		—		24	1
Bristol City	2023–24	Championship	13	0	2	0	—		—		15	0
Bristol City	2024–25	Championship	0	0	0	0	1	0	—		1	0
Bristol City	Total		36	1	3	0	1	0	—		40	1
Birmingham City (loan)	2024–25	League One	33	3	2	0	—		7	0	42	3
Birmingham City	2025–26	Championship	1	0	0	0	1	0	—		2	0
Birmingham City	2026–27	Championship	0	0	0	0	0	0	—		0	0
Birmingham City	Total		1	0	0	0	1	0	—		2	0
Blackburn Rovers (loan)	2025–26	Championship	30	0	1	0	—		—		31	0
Career total			152	6	10	0	6	0	10	1	178	7

== Honours ==
Birmingham City

- EFL League One: 2024–25
- EFL Trophy runner-up: 2024–25
