= Joe Williams (footballer, born 1996) =

English footballer

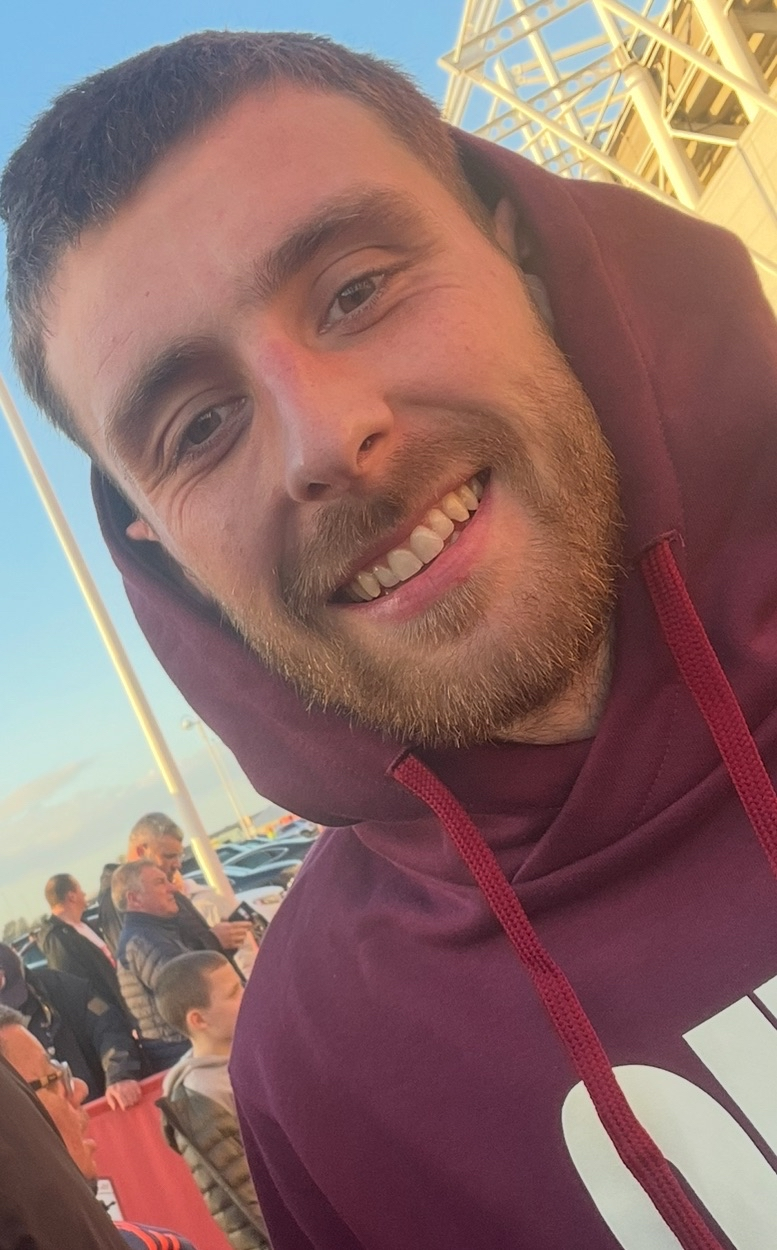
- Williams in 2024.

Personal information
- Full name: Joseph Michael Williams
- Date of birth: 8 December 1996 (age 29)
- Place of birth: Liverpool, England
- Height: 5 ft 10 in (1.78 m)
- Position: Midfielder

Team information
- Current team: Bristol City
- Number: 8

Youth career
- 2004–2017: Everton

Senior career*
Years	Team	Apps	(Gls)
2017–2019	Everton	0	(0)
2017–2018	→ Barnsley (loan)	34	(1)
2018–2019	→ Bolton Wanderers (loan)	29	(0)
2019–2020	Wigan Athletic	38	(1)
2020–	Bristol City	133	(2)

International career
2016	England U20	2	(0)
- * Club domestic league appearances and goals as of 13:26, 8 November 2026 (UTC)

Joseph Michael Williams (born 8 December 1996) is an English professional footballer who plays as a midfielder for EFL Championship club Bristol City.

Williams began his career with Everton, spending loan spells at Barnsley and Bolton Wanderers, later playing for Wigan Athletic and Bristol City.

== Club career ==
Williams was born in Liverpool, Merseyside. He joined local side Everton at the age of seven, progressing through the age groups to become a first year scholar in June 2013. In November 2014 he appeared as an unused substitute for the UEFA Europa League game against FC Krasnodar.

In July 2017 he joined Barnsley on loan. He scored his first goal for the club in a 4–2 win at Burton Albion on 31 October 2017.

On 23 August 2018 he joined Bolton Wanderers on a season long loan.

In July 2019 he signed for Wigan Athletic.

On 20 August 2020, Williams signed for Bristol City for £1,200,000 signing a four-year deal. On 29 May 2024, Williams signed a new three-year contract extension.

== International career ==
He has represented England at under-20 youth level.

== Career statistics ==
As of match played 7 November 2026

Appearances and goals by club, season and competition
Club	Season	League			FA Cup		League Cup		Other		Total	
Club	Season	Division	Apps	Goals	Apps	Goals	Apps	Goals	Apps	Goals	Apps	Goals
Everton	2017–18	Premier League	0	0	0	0	0	0	0	0	0	0
Everton	2018–19	Premier League	0	0	0	0	0	0	—		0	0
Everton	Total		0	0	0	0	0	0	0	0	0	0
Barnsley (loan)	2017–18	Championship	34	1	1	0	3	0	—		38	1
Bolton Wanderers (loan)	2018–19	Championship	29	0	0	0	0	0	—		29	0
Wigan Athletic	2019–20	Championship	38	1	1	0	1	0	—		40	1
Bristol City	2020–21	Championship	1	0	1	0	0	0	—		2	0
Bristol City	2021–22	Championship	22	0	0	0	1	0	—		23	0
Bristol City	2022–23	Championship	33	2	4	0	1	0	—		38	2
Bristol City	2023–24	Championship	40	0	3	0	2	0	—		45	0
Bristol City	2024–25	Championship	24	0	0	0	1	0	1 (Note: Appearance in the EFL Championship play-offs)	0	26	0
Bristol City	2025–26	Championship	2	0	0	0	0	0	—		2	0
Bristol City	2026–27	Championship	11	0	0	0	1	0	—		12	0
Bristol City	Total		133	2	8	0	6	0	1	0	148	2
Career total			234	3	10	0	10	0	1	0	255	3
