= Cameron Pring =

English footballer (born 1998)

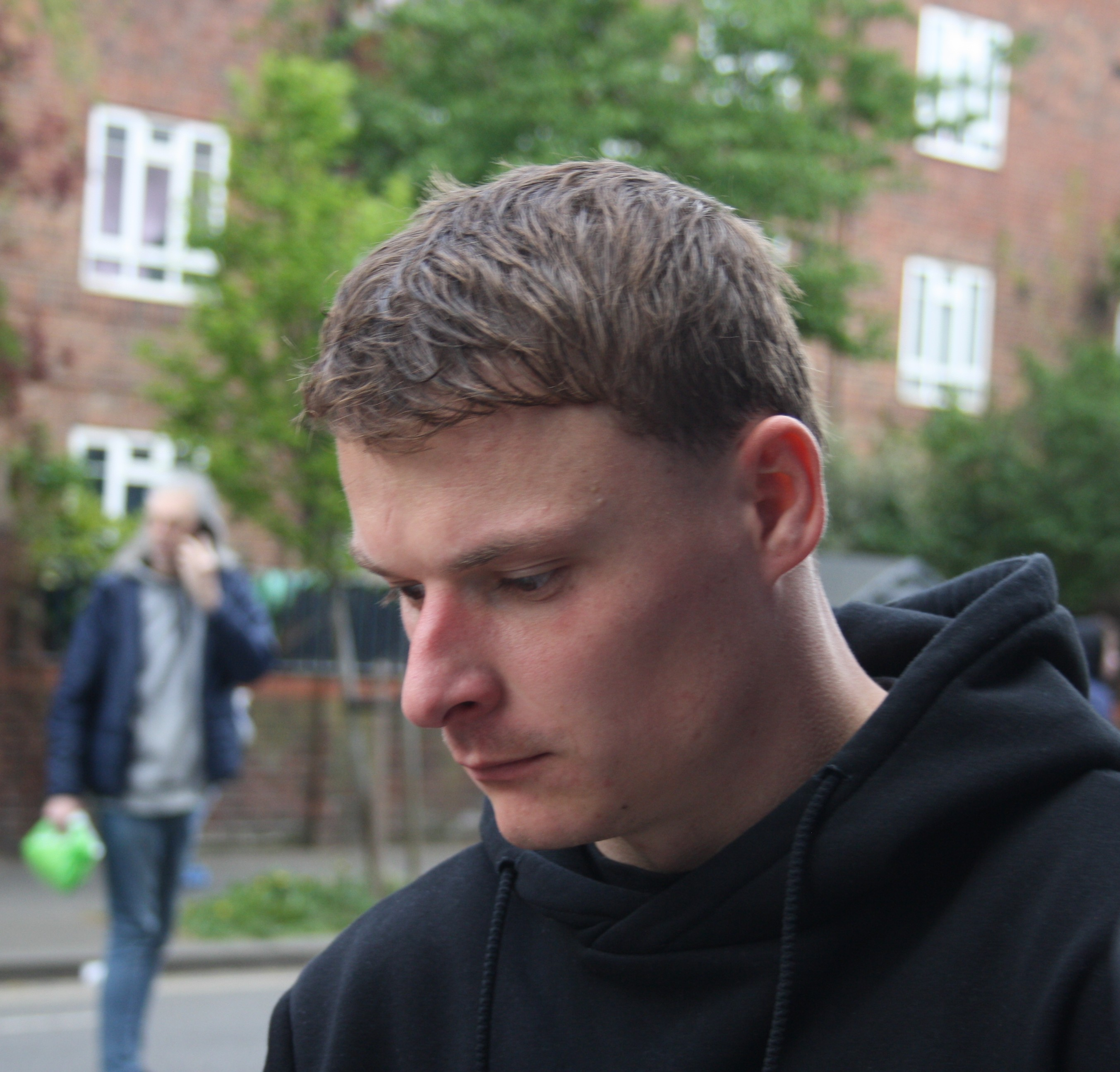
- Pring in 2026.

Personal information
- Full name: Cameron Lewis Moir-Pring
- Date of birth: 22 January 1998 (age 28)
- Place of birth: Bristol, England
- Height: 1.85 m (6 ft 1 in)
- Position: Left back

Team information
- Current team: Bristol City
- Number: 3

Youth career
- 2012–2016: Cheltenham Town

Senior career*
Years	Team	Apps	(Gls)
2016–	Bristol City	177	(2)
2017	→ Guernsey (loan)	4	(0)
2017	→ Merthyr Town (loan)	3	(0)
2017	→ Aldershot Town (loan)	1	(0)
2017–2018	→ Hereford (loan)	14	(0)
2018–2019	→ Newport County (loan)	7	(1)
2019	→ Cheltenham Town (loan)	8	(0)
2019–2020	→ Walsall (loan)	21	(0)
2020–2021	→ Portsmouth (loan)	9	(0)
- * Club domestic league appearances and goals as of 09:19, 22 November 2026 (UTC)

Cameron Lewis Moir-Pring (born 22 January 1998) is an English professional footballer who plays as a left back for EFL Championship club Bristol City.

== Career ==
Born in Bristol, Pring began his career with Cheltenham Town, joining their youth academy as a 14-year-old in 2012. In January 2016 he moved to his hometown club Bristol City.

In January 2017, Pring moved to Guernsey on a youth loan, making four appearances in the Isthmian League Division One South. He then spent further loan spells at Merthyr Town, Aldershot Town and Hereford during the 2017–18 season.

He moved on loan to Newport County in August 2018. He made his debut for Newport on 11 September 2018 against Swindon Town in a 1–0 EFL Trophy defeat, and on 17 November 2018 he scored his first senior goal in a 2–0 win against Colchester United. He returned to hometown club Cheltenham Town on loan in January 2019 until the end of the 2018–19 season.

On 3 July 2019, Pring signed for League Two side Walsall on a season-long loan deal.

On 1 September 2020 he moved on loan to Portsmouth for the 2020–21 season. However, this loan spell was cut short and he returned to his parent club in early January 2021.

On 2 February 2024, it was announced that Pring had been voted Bristol City's January Player of the Month, receiving 57% of the total votes.

On 22 May 2025, Pring signed a three-year extension at Bristol City, keeping him at the club until summer 2028.

== Career statistics ==
As of match played 21 November 2026

Appearances and goals by club, season and competition
Club	Season	League			FA Cup		EFL Cup		Other		Total	
Club	Season	Division	Apps	Goals	Apps	Goals	Apps	Goals	Apps	Goals	Apps	Goals
Bristol City	2016–17	Championship	0	0	0	0	0	0	—		0	0
Bristol City	2017–18	Championship	0	0	0	0	0	0	—		0	0
Bristol City	2018–19	Championship	0	0	0	0	0	0	—		0	0
Bristol City	2019–20	Championship	0	0	0	0	0	0	—		0	0
Bristol City	2020–21	Championship	0	0	0	0	0	0	—		0	0
Bristol City	2021–22	Championship	32	0	1	0	1	0	—		34	0
Bristol City	2022–23	Championship	32	1	3	0	2	0	—		37	1
Bristol City	2023–24	Championship	42	1	3	0	0	0	—		45	1
Bristol City	2024–25	Championship	32	0	0	0	0	0	1 (Note: Appearances in EFL Championship play-offs)	0	33	0
Bristol City	2025–26	Championship	25	0	1	0	0	0	—		26	0
Bristol City	2026–27	Championship	14	0	0	0	1	0	—		15	0
Bristol City	Total		177	2	8	0	4	0	1	0	190	2
Guernsey (loan)	2016–17	Isthmian League; Division One South	4	0	—		—		—		4	0
Merthyr Town (loan)	2017–18	Southern League; Premier Division	3	0	—		—		—		3	0
Aldershot Town (loan)	2017–18	National League	1	0	—		—		—		1	0
Hereford (loan)	2017–18	Southern League; Premier Division	14	0	—		—		3 (Note: Appearances in FA Trophy)	0	17	0
Newport County (loan)	2018–19	League Two	7	1	1	0	0	0	3 (Note: Appearances in EFL Trophy)	0	11	1
Cheltenham Town (loan)	2018–19	League Two	8	0	—		—		—		8	0
Walsall (loan)	2019–20	League Two	21	0	1	0	0	0	2	0	24	0
Portsmouth (loan)	2020–21	League One	9	0	2	0	1	0	3	0	15	0
Career total			243	3	12	0	5	0	12	0	272	3
