= Robert Dickie (footballer) =

English footballer (born 1996)

Personal information
- Full name: Robert Joseph Andrew Dickie
- Date of birth: 3 March 1996 (age 30)
- Place of birth: Wokingham, England
- Height: 6 ft 4 in (1.93 m)
- Position: Defender

Team information
- Current team: Bristol City
- Number: 16

Youth career
- 2004–2014: Reading

Senior career*
Years	Team	Apps	(Gls)
2014–2018	Reading	1	(0)
2014–2015	→ Basingstoke Town (loan)	24	(1)
2015–2017	→ Cheltenham Town (loan)	47	(5)
2017–2018	→ Lincoln City (loan)	18	(0)
2018–2020	Oxford United	76	(2)
2020–2023	Queens Park Rangers	119	(6)
2023–	Bristol City	110	(8)

International career^{‡}
2014	England U18	1	(0)
2014	England U19	1	(0)
- * Club domestic league appearances and goals as of 21:12, 2 May 2026 (UTC) ‡ National team caps and goals as of 14:42, 7 May 2016 (UTC)

Robert Joseph Andrew Dickie (born 3 March 1996) is an English professional footballer who plays for EFL Championship club Bristol City as a defender. He has represented England at U19 level.

== Club career ==
=== Reading ===
Dickie joined Reading as an eight-year-old.

In the 2013-14 season, Dickie made 34 appearances playing every minute of the FA Youth Cup campaign for the under-18s where he scored in the semi-final against Fulham.

Dickie signed his first professional contract with Reading on the 3 July 2014.

On 24 December 2014, Dickie made his first loan to Basingstoke Town until 25 April 2015. He made 24 appearances for Basingstoke and helped them to reach the Conference South play-offs but it all ended in defeat over two legs against Whitehawk.

Dickie only made one appearance for Reading when he came on as a substitute and played 45 minutes in the last game of the 2015-16 season against Blackburn Rovers.

On 9 May 2016, Dickie was one of 15 Reading youth-team players offered a new contract by the club, with confirmation of his new deal being signed coming on 1 July 2016.

After the second loan spell at Cheltenham Town came to an end, Dickie was involved with under-23 team and captained the side to the Premier League Cup final during the latter part of the 2016-17 season which ended in defeat against Swansea City. He also provided a goal against Norwich City in the semi-final.

==== Cheltenham Town (loan) ====
On 20 August 2015, Dickie joined Cheltenham Town on a one-month loan deal, making him Cheltenham's 17th signing of the window. The manager Gary Johnson was pleased with the signing as a Dickie suffered a slight injury in pre-season which delayed the process. Two days later, on 22 August, Dickie scored the winner on his debut in a 2–1 win over Barrow. Dickie's loan deal was then extended on for an additional month on 23 September, on 16 October, and again on 10 December until the end of January. While on loan at the club, Dickie was utilised in many different positions in the defence; right back, centre back and on the right side of a back three. During Cheltenham Town's 3–1 victory over Chelmsford City in the FA Trophy on 12 December, Dickie scored a hat-trick. Dickie returned to Reading on January to recover from an injury, before rejoining Cheltenham Town for their promotion push on 23 March, helping them secure the title against FC Halifax Town on 16 April.

On 25 August 2016. Dickie re-joined Cheltenham Town on loan until 2 January 2017.

==== Lincoln City (loan) ====
On 1 August 2017, Dickie joined Lincoln City on loan until January 2018. Dickie made his debut 5 days later in a 2–2 draw against Wycombe Wanderers. During his short time at the club, Dickie kept captain Luke Waterfall out of the team and he claimed that his partnership with Sean Raggett helped him improved his game.

=== Oxford United ===
On 4 January 2018, Dickie joined Oxford United on a two-and-a-half-year contract for an undisclosed fee from Reading. He made his debut on 13 February in a 3–1 League One defeat at Rotherham United, and scored his first goal for the club against Peterborough United in a League One home fixture on 17 March 2018.

During the 2018–19 campaign, Dickie established himself as a key player making 49 appearances and made a fundamental partnership with Curtis Nelson which lead to an upturn in form. After spending large parts of the season in the relegation zone, Dickie helped them achieve a 12th-placed finish.

On 31 July 2019, Dickie signed a new two-year contract keeping him at the club until the summer of 2021. During the 2019–20 season, Dickie proved crucial to Oxford's performances in League One after Curtis Nelson joined Cardiff making Dickie first choice. On 25 January 2020, Dickie partnered with Elliot Moore to produce a clean sheet against Premier League side Newcastle in the FA Cup fourth round in what was his 100th appearance for the club, leading them to a replay which ended in a 3–2 defeat after extra time. On 18 February 2020, Dickie became the captain for the first time in a 5–0 win over AFC Wimbledon due to an injury to regular captain John Mousinho. It was announced that he would remain captain for the rest of the season. Dickie helped them reach to the League One play-off final where they lost 2–1 to Wycombe Wanderers. Dickie was voted the Supporters' Player of the Year for 2019–20.

=== Queens Park Rangers ===
Dickie signed for Championship club Queens Park Rangers on 1 September 2020, joining on a four-year deal for an undisclosed fee. Former QPR and Oxford player Jamie Mackie urged Dickie to sign for QPR and snub Premier League offers claiming it would be better for his long-term development. He scored his first goal for QPR in a 2–1 loss to Bristol City on 1 December 2020. On 6 March 2021, Dickie scored his second goal for the club against the same opponents as QPR beat Bristol City 2–0 away from home. In his first season at the club, Dickie won Supporters' Player of the Year, Players' Player of the Year and Goal of the Season for his long-ranged goal at Middlesbrough on the 17 April 2021.

=== Bristol City ===
On 5 June 2023, Dickie signed for Championship side Bristol City for an undisclosed seven figure fee, signing a three-year contract with the option for a further year. He was voted as the club's Player of the Month for October 2023 and February 2024.

On 15 October 2025, the club announced Dickie had signed a contract extension until 2028.

== International career ==
In March 2014, Dickie received his first call up to the England U18s for their match against Germany U18. On the 12 October 2014, Dickie made his debut for the England U19s coming on at half time and keeping a clean sheet in a 8–0 win over Luxembourg. Dickie went on to be called up to the England U19s a year later.

== Career statistics ==
As of 5 September 2026

Appearances and goals by club, season and competition
Club	Season	League			FA Cup		League Cup		Other		Total	
Club	Season	Division	Apps	Goals	Apps	Goals	Apps	Goals	Apps	Goals	Apps	Goals
Reading	2014–15	Championship	0	0	0	0	0	0	—		0	0
Reading	2015–16	Championship	1	0	0	0	0	0	—		1	0
Reading	2016–17	Championship	0	0	0	0	0	0	—		0	0
Reading	2017–18	Championship	0	0	0	0	0	0	—		0	0
Reading	Total		1	0	0	0	0	0	—		1	0
Basingstoke Town (loan)	2014–15	Conference South	24	1	0	0	—		—		24	1
Cheltenham Town (loan)	2015–16	National League	27	3	3	0	—		1 (Note: Appearance in FA Trophy)	3	31	6
Cheltenham Town (loan)	2016–17	League Two	20	2	3	0	0	0	3 (Note: Appearances in EFL Trophy)	0	26	2
Cheltenham Town (loan)	Total		47	5	6	0	0	0	4	3	57	8
Lincoln City (loan)	2017–18	League Two	18	0	1	0	1	0	3	0	23	0
Oxford United	2017–18	League One	5	1	0	0	0	0	—		5	1
Oxford United	2018–19	League One	37	1	4	0	3	0	5	0	49	1
Oxford United	2019–20	League One	34	0	5	0	4	0	6 (Note: Appearances in EFL League One play-offs)	1	49	1
Oxford United	Total		76	2	9	0	7	0	11	1	103	3
Queens Park Rangers	2020–21	Championship	43	3	1	0	1	0	—		45	3
Queens Park Rangers	2021–22	Championship	38	3	2	0	4	2	—		44	5
Queens Park Rangers	2022–23	Championship	38	0	1	0	1	0	—		40	0
Queens Park Rangers	Total		119	6	4	0	6	2	—		129	8
Bristol City	2023–24	Championship	41	5	4	0	2	0	—		47	5
Bristol City	2024–25	Championship	36	2	0	0	0	0	1 (Note: Appearances in EFL Championship play-offs)	0	37	2
Bristol City	2025–26	Championship	33	1	1	0	2	0	—		36	1
Bristol City	2026–27	Championship	5	1	0	0	1	0	—		6	1
Bristol City	Total		115	9	5	0	5	0	1	0	126	9
Career total			400	23	25	0	19	2	19	4	463	29

== Honours ==
Cheltenham Town

- National League: 2015–16

Individual

- PFA Team of the Year: 2019–20 League One
- Oxford United Supporters' Player of the Year: 2019–20
- Queens Park Rangers Supporters' Player of the Year: 2020–21
- Bristol City Supporters' Player of the Year: 2023–24
- Bristol City Players' Player of the Year: 2023–24
