= 2023–24 Bristol City F.C. season =

126th season in existence of Bristol City FC

Bristol City
2023–24 season
- Owner: Stephen Lansdown
- Manager: Nigel Pearson (until 29 October); Curtis Fleming (interim, from 29 October to 7 November); Liam Manning (from 7 November)
- Stadium: Ashton Gate
- Championship: 11th
- FA Cup: Fourth round
- EFL Cup: Second round
- Top goalscorer: League: Tommy Conway (10); All: Tommy Conway (12)
- Highest home attendance: 25,857
- Lowest home attendance: 9,661
- Biggest win: 5–0 (league) v Blackburn Rovers 10 April 2024
- Biggest defeat: 0–4 v Stoke City 4 May 2024 (league)
Home colours	Away colours	Third colours

The 2023–24 season was the 126th season in the history of Bristol City and their ninth consecutive season in the Championship. The club participated in the Championship, the FA Cup, and the EFL Cup.

== First-team squad ==
As of 22 March 2024

No.	Player	Position	Nationality	Place of birth	Date of birth (age)	Previous club	Date signed	Fee	Contract end
Goalkeepers
1	Max O'Leary	GK	(Republic of Ireland)	(England) Bath	10 October 1996 (aged 26)	Academy	1 July 2015	Trainee	30 June 2026
23	Stefan Bajic	GK	(France)	Saint-Étienne	23 December 2001 (aged 21)	(France) Pau	5 July 2022	Free	30 June 2025
Defenders
3	Cameron Pring	LB	(England)	Cheltenham	22 January 1998 (aged 25)	Academy	1 July 2020	Trainee	30 June 2026
4	Kal Naismith	CB	(Scotland)	Glasgow	18 February 1992 (aged 31)	Luton Town	1 July 2022	Free	30 June 2025
5	Robert Atkinson	CB	(England)	Chesterfield	13 July 1998 (aged 25)	Oxford United	3 July 2021	£1,500,000	30 June 2026
16	Robert Dickie	CB	(England)	Wokingham	3 March 1996 (aged 27)	Queens Park Rangers	14 June 2023	£700,000	30 June 2026
19	George Tanner	RB	(England)	Blackpool	16 November 1999 (aged 23)	Carlisle United	30 August 2021	Undisclosed	30 June 2026
22	Taylor Gardner-Hickman	RB	(England)	Telford	30 December 2001 (age 24)	West Bromwich Albion	15 January 2024	Undisclosed	30 June 2027
24	Haydon Roberts	CB	(England)	Brighton	10 May 2002 (aged 21)	Brighton & Hove Albion	1 July 2023	Free	30 June 2026
26	Zak Vyner	CB	(Kenya)	(England) Southwark	14 May 1997 (aged 26)	Academy	1 June 2015	Trainee	30 June 2026
27	Jamie Knight-Lebel	CB	(Canada)	Montréal	24 December 2004 (aged 18)	Academy	1 July 2023	Trainee	30 June 2027
34	Joseph James	CB	(England)	Weston-super-Mare	27 June 2006 (aged 17)	Academy	20 October 2023	Trainee	30 June 2024
35	Duncan Idehen	CB	(England)		3 July 2002 (aged 21)	Birmingham City	1 January 2022	Undisclosed	30 June 2024
Midfielders
2	Ross McCrorie	DM	(Scotland)	Dailly	18 March 1998 (aged 25)	(Scotland) Aberdeen	14 June 2023	£1,975,000	30 June 2026
6	Matty James	CM	(England)	Bacup	22 July 1991 (aged 32)	Leicester City	1 July 2021	Free	30 June 2024
7	Scott Twine	AM	(England)	Swindon	14 July 1999 (aged 24)	Burnley	15 January 2024	Loan	31 May 2024
8	Joe Williams	CM	(England)	Liverpool	8 December 1996 (aged 26)	Wigan Athletic	20 August 2020	Undisclosed	30 June 2024
10	Andy King	CM	(Wales)	(England) Barnstaple	29 October 1988 (aged 34)	(Belgium) Oud-Heverlee Leuven	2 July 2021	Free	30 June 2024
11	Anis Mehmeti	AM	(Albania)	(England) Islington	9 January 2001 (aged 22)	Wycombe Wanderers	31 January 2023	Undisclosed	30 June 2026
12	Jason Knight	CM	(Republic of Ireland)	Dublin	13 February 2001 (aged 22)	Derby County	11 July 2023	£1,975,000	30 June 2027
17	Mark Sykes	RM	(Republic of Ireland)	(Northern Ireland) Belfast	4 August 1997 (aged 26)	Oxford United	1 July 2022	Free	30 June 2025
18	Ayman Benarous	CM	(England)	Bristol	27 July 2003 (aged 20)	Academy	1 July 2021	Trainee	30 June 2025
36	Jed Meerholz	CM	(England)	Bristol	23 February 2006 (aged 17)	Academy	2 December 2023	Trainee	30 June 2024
37	Tommy Backwell	CM	(England)	Bristol	22 June 2003 (aged 20)	Academy	1 July 2022	Trainee	30 June 2024
Forwards
9	Harry Cornick	CF	(England)	Poole	9 April 1995 (aged 28)	Luton Town	31 January 2023	Undisclosed	30 June 2026
15	Tommy Conway	CF	(Scotland)	(England) Taunton	6 August 2002 (aged 20)	Academy	1 July 2021	Trainee	30 June 2025
20	Sam Bell	CF	(England)	Bristol	23 May 2002 (aged 21)	Academy	1 July 2020	Trainee	30 June 2026
21	Nahki Wells	CF	(Bermuda)	Hamilton	1 June 1990 (aged 33)	Burnley	30 January 2020	£4,750,000	30 June 2025
30	Raekwon Nelson	CF	(England)		26 October 2005 (aged 17)	Academy	23 May 2022	Trainee	30 June 2026
47	Adedire Mebude	RW	(Scotland)	(England) London	28 May 2004 (aged 19)	(Belgium) Westerlo	1 February 2024	Loan	31 May 2024
Out on Loan
13	Harvey Wiles-Richards	GK	(England)	Bath	27 May 2002 (aged 21)	Bath City	1 July 2020	Free	30 June 2024
14	Andreas Weimann	AM	(Austria)	Vienna	5 August 1991 (aged 32)	Derby County	3 July 2018	£2,250,000	30 June 2024
28	Raphael Araoye	CB	(Germany)	Hamburg	22 April 2004 (aged 19)	Academy	1 July 2023	Trainee	30 June 2024
29	Ephraim Yeboah	CF	(Italy)	Montirone	21 July 2006 (aged 17)	Academy	21 July 2023	Trainee	30 June 2026
32	Lewis Thomas	GK	(Wales)	Swansea	20 September 1997 (aged 25)	Forest Green Rovers	29 September 2023	Free	30 June 2025
38	Omar Taylor-Clarke	DM	(Wales)	Newport	10 December 2003 (aged 19)	Academy	10 October 2022	Trainee	30 June 2025
—N/a	Max Bird	DM	(England)	Burton upon Trent	18 September 2000 (aged 22)	Derby County	1 February 2024	Undisclsoed	30 June 2027

== Statistics ==
As of 10 February 2024
Players with names in italics and marked * were on loan from another club for the whole of their season with Bristol City.

No.	Pos	Nat	Player	Total		Championship		FA Cup		EFL Cup	
No.	Pos	Nat	Player	Apps	Goals	Apps	Goals	Apps	Goals	Apps	Goals
1	GK	(Republic of Ireland) IRL	Max O'Leary	37	0	31+0	0	4+0	0	2+0	0
2	DF	(Scotland) SCO	Ross McCrorie	8	0	2+3	0	3+0	0	0+0	0
3	DF	(England) ENG	Cameron Pring	33	1	29+1	1	3+0	0	0+0	0
4	DF	(Scotland) SCO	Kal Naismith	15	2	9+4	1	0+0	0	1+1	1
6	MF	(England) ENG	Matty James	36	3	26+4	3	2+2	0	0+2	0
7	MF	(England) ENG	Scott Twine	1	1	1+0	1	0+0	0	0+0	0
8	MF	(England) ENG	Joe Williams	31	0	19+7	0	3+0	0	2+0	0
9	FW	(England) ENG	Harry Cornick	33	2	5+22	1	0+4	0	2+0	1
10	MF	(Wales) WAL	Andy King	10	0	2+5	0	1+0	0	2+0	0
11	MF	(Albania) ALB	Anis Mehmeti	29	1	10+13	1	4+0	0	2+0	0
12	MF	(Republic of Ireland) IRL	Jason Knight	37	6	30+1	3	3+1	1	1+1	2
14	FW	(Austria) AUT	Andreas Weimann	21	1	9+11	1	0+1	0	0+0	0
15	FW	(Scotland) SCO	Tommy Conway	28	8	16+8	6	4+0	2	0+0	0
16	DF	(England) ENG	Rob Dickie	35	3	27+2	3	4+0	0	2+0	0
17	MF	(Republic of Ireland) IRL	Mark Sykes	28	5	23+3	5	0+0	0	1+1	0
19	DF	(England) ENG	George Tanner	32	0	25+1	0	3+1	0	2+0	0
20	FW	(England) ENG	Sam Bell	37	4	21+10	4	2+2	0	0+2	0
21	FW	(Bermuda) BER	Nahki Wells	26	4	13+7	3	0+4	0	2+0	1
22	DF	(England) ENG	Taylor Gardner-Hickman*	30	1	17+10	1	3+0	0	0+0	0
24	DF	(England) ENG	Haydon Roberts	12	0	1+8	0	1+0	0	2+0	0
26	DF	(Kenya) KEN	Zak Vyner	29	0	24+0	0	4+0	0	1+0	0
27	DF	(Canada) CAN	Jamie Knight-Lebel	2	0	0+1	0	0+1	0	0+0	0
29	FW	(Italy) ITA	Ephraim Yeboah	12	0	0+10	0	0+0	0	0+2	0
34	DF	(England) ENG	Joseph James	2	0	1+1	0	0+0	0	0+0	0

=== Goals record ===
As of 4 May 2024

Rank	No.	Nat.	Po.	Name	Championship	FA Cup	EFL Cup	Total
1	15	(Scotland)	CF	Tommy Conway	10	2	0	12
2	21	(Bermuda)	CF	Nahki Wells	7	0	1	8
3	12	(Republic of Ireland)	CM	Jason Knight	4	1	2	7
4	20	(England)	CF	Sam Bell	5	0	0	5
4	16	(England)	CB	Rob Dickie	5	0	0	5
4	17	(Republic of Ireland)	RM	Mark Sykes	5	0	0	5
7	11	(Albania)	CM	Anis Mehmeti	4	0	0	4
8	9	(England)	CF	Harry Cornick	2	0	1	3
8	6	(England)	CM	Matty James	3	0	0	3
10	4	(Scotland)	LB	Kal Naismith	1	0	1	2
10	7	(England)	CM	Scott Twine	2	0	0	2
12	22	(England)	CM	Taylor Gardner-Hickman	1	0	0	1
12	24	(England)	CB	Haydon Roberts	1	0	0	1
12	14	(Austria)	CF	Andreas Weimann	1	0	0	1
12	Total				51	3	5	59

=== Disciplinary record ===
As of 25 October 2023

Rank	No.	Nat.	Po.	Name	Championship			FA Cup			EFL Cup			Total		
Rank	No.	Nat.	Po.	Name	Yellow card	(yellow card) (yellow-red card)	Red card	Yellow card	(yellow card) (yellow-red card)	Red card	Yellow card	(yellow card) (yellow-red card)	Red card	Yellow card	(yellow card) (yellow-red card)	Red card
1	16	(England)	CB	Rob Dickie	1	1	0	0	0	0	1	0	0	2	1	0
1	21	(Bermuda)	CF	Nahki Wells	3	0	0	0	0	0	0	0	0	3	0	0
2	8	(England)	CM	Joe Williams	2	0	0	0	0	0	0	0	0	2	0	0
2	14	(Austria)	SS	Andreas Weimann	2	0	0	0	0	0	0	0	0	2	0	0
2	19	(England)	RB	George Tanner	2	0	0	0	0	0	0	0	0	2	0	0
2	22	(England)	RB	Taylor Gardner-Hickman	2	0	0	0	0	0	0	0	0	2	0	0
2	29	(Italy)	CF	Ephraim Yeboah	2	0	0	0	0	0	0	0	0	2	0	0
8	3	(England)	LB	Cameron Pring	1	0	0	0	0	0	0	0	0	1	0	0
8	4	(Scotland)	LB	Kal Naismith	1	0	0	0	0	0	0	0	0	1	0	0
8	24	(England)	LB	Haydon Roberts	1	0	0	0	0	0	0	0	0	1	0	0
8	12	(Republic of Ireland)	CM	Jason Knight	1	0	0	0	0	0	0	0	0	1	0	0
8	24	(England)	LB	Haydon Roberts	0	0	0	0	0	0	1	0	0	1	0	0
Total					18	0	0	0	0	0	2	0	0	20	0	0

== Transfers ==
=== In ===
Date	Pos	Player	Transferred from	Fee	Ref.
14 June 2023	DF	(England) Robert Dickie	(England) Queens Park Rangers	Undisclosed	
14 June 2023	DF	(Scotland) Ross McCrorie	(Scotland) Aberdeen	Undisclosed	
1 July 2023	DF	(England) Haydon Roberts	(England) Brighton & Hove Albion	Free transfer	
11 July 2023	MF	(Republic of Ireland) Jason Knight	(England) Derby County	Undisclosed	
29 September 2023	GK	(Wales) Lewis Thomas	(England) Forest Green Rovers	Free transfer	
2 January 2024	FW	(England) Jack Griffin	(England) Guernsey	Undisclosed	
2 January 2024	DF	(England) Jack Hooper	Unattached	Free transfer	
3 January 2024	MF	(Republic of Ireland) Adam Murphy	(Republic of Ireland) St Patrick's Athletic	Undisclosed	
15 January 2024	DF	(England) Taylor Gardner-Hickman	(England) West Bromwich Albion	Undisclosed	
22 January 2024	MF	(England) Josh Stokes	(England) Aldershot Town	£250,000	
1 February 2024	MF	(England) Max Bird	(England) Derby County	Undisclosed	
16 February 2024	GK	(England) Isaac Finch	(England) Bridgwater United	Free transfer	

=== Out ===
Date	Pos	Player	Transferred to	Fee	Ref
30 June 2023	GK	(England) Will Buse	(England) Yeovil Town	Free transfer	
30 June 2023	DF	(England) Jay Dasilva	(England) Coventry City	Free transfer	
30 June 2023	FW	(England) Prince Henry	(England) Bromsgrove Sporting	Free transfer	
30 June 2023	DF	(England) Taylor Moore	(France) Valenciennes	Free transfer	
30 June 2023	MF	(England) James Morton	(England) Weston-super-Mare	Free transfer	
30 June 2023	MF	(England) Josh Owers	(England) Yeovil Town	Free transfer	
30 June 2023	MF	(Wales) Joseph Porton	(England) Melksham Town	Free transfer	
30 June 2023	DF	(England) James Taylor	(England) Truro City	Free transfer	
11 July 2023	DF	(England) Kane Wilson	(England) Derby County	Undisclosed	
16 July 2023	MF	(England) Brandon Oputeri	(England) Yate Town	Free transfer	
18 July 2023	DF	(Wales) Joe Low	(England) Wycombe Wanderers	Undisclosed	
10 August 2023	MF	(England) Alex Scott	(England) AFC Bournemouth	£25,000,000	
26 August 2023	DF	(Czech Republic) Tomáš Kalas	(Germany) Schalke 04	Free transfer	
1 September 2023	MF	(France) Han-Noah Massengo	(England) Burnley	Compensation	
1 September 2023	FW	(England) Owura Edwards	(England) Colchester United	Undisclosed	
12 January 2024	FW	(Wales) Sam Pearson	(England) Yeovil Town	Free transfer	

=== Loaned in ===
Date	Pos	Player	Loaned from	Until	Ref
22 August 2023	DF	(England) Taylor Gardner-Hickman	(England) West Bromwich Albion	15 January 2024 (Note: Gardner-Hickman joined Bristol City on a permanent transfer.)	
15 January 2024	FW	(England) Scott Twine	(England) Burnley	End of season	
1 February 2024	FW	(Scotland) Adedire Mebude	(Belgium) Westerlo	End of season	

=== Loaned out ===
Date	Pos	Player	Loaned to	Until	Ref
13 July 2023	DF	(Wales) Zac Bell	(England) Yeovil Town	1 January 2024	
20 July 2023	FW	(England) Olly Thomas	(England) Yeovil Town	31 August 2023 (Note: Thomas was recalled early from his loan at Yeovil Town.)	
20 July 2023	FW	(England) Seb Palmer-Houlden	(Wales) Newport County	End of season	
21 July 2023	MF	(England) Ewan Clark	(England) Bath City	13 January 2024 (Note: Clark was recalled early from his loan at Bath City.)	
26 July 2023	GK	(Wales) Josey Casa-Grande	(England) Tiverton Town	13 January 2024 (Note: Casa-Grande was recalled early from his loan at Tiverton Town.)	
4 August 2023	MF	(England) Dylan Kadji	(England) Forest Green Rovers	4 March 2024	
1 September 2023	FW	(England) Olly Thomas	(Wales) Newport County	24 November 2023 (Note: On 24 November, Thomas returned early from his loan spell at Newport.)	
18 October 2023	DF	(Wales) Harry Leeson	(England) Gloucester City	7 January 2024	
27 October 2023	MF	(England) Kai Churchley	(England) Gloucester City	27 November 2023	
15 November 2023	DF	(England) Duncan Idehen	(England) Yeovil Town	18 December 2023 (Note: Idehen was recalled early from his loan at Yeovil Town.)	
9 January 2024	DF	(Wales) Zac Bell	(England) Taunton Town	End of season	
9 January 2024	FW	(Wales) Marley Rose	(England) Taunton Town	End of season	
13 January 2024	GK	(Wales) Josey Casa-Grande	(England) Bath City	End of season	
15 January 2024	FW	(Austria) Andreas Weimann	(England) West Bromwich Albion	End of season	
22 January 2024	MF	(England) Josh Stokes	(England) Aldershot Town	End of season	
23 January 2024	DF	(Germany) Raphael Araoye	(England) Weston-super-Mare	20 February 2024	
1 February 2024	MF	(England) Max Bird	(England) Derby County	End of season	
23 February 2024	GK	(England) Mac Boyd	(England) Cribbs	End of Season	
23 February 2024	FW	(England) Olly Thomas	(England) Yeovil Town	End of Season	
23 February 2024	DF	(Wales) Callum Wood	(England) Weston-super-Mare	End of Season	
27 February 2024	FW	(Italy) Ephraim Yeboah	(England) Bath City	End of Season	
1 March 2024	GK	(England) Harvey Wiles-Richards	(England) Weymouth	End of Season	
4 March 2024	MF	(England) Dylan Kadji	(England) Aldershot Town	End of Season	
11 March 2024	MF	(Wales) Omar Taylor-Clarke	(England) Weston-super-Mare	End of Season	
22 March 2024	DF	(England) Duncan Idehen	(England) Bath City	End of Season	
22 March 2024	GK	(Wales) Lewis Thomas	(England) Bromley	End of Season	

=== New Contracts ===
Date	Pos	Player	Length	Squad	Ref
14 July 2023	FW	(England) Seb Palmer-Houlden	1 year	Under-21s	
14 July 2023	MF	(Wales) Andy King	1 year	First team	
21 July 2023	FW	(Italy) Ephraim Yeboah	3 years	First team	
24 July 2023	DF	(England) Cameron Pring	3 years	First team	
1 September 2023	DF	(Kenya) Zak Vyner	3 years	First team	
3 October 2023	FW	(England) Sam Bell	3 years	First team	
16 February 2024	GK	(Wales) Josey Casa-Grande	2 years	Under-21s	
16 February 2024	GK	(Wales) Lewis Thomas	1 year	First team	
21 February 2024	FW	(England) Seb Palmer-Houlden	3 years	Under-21s	
15 March 2024	DF	(Canada) Jamie Knight-Lebel	3 years	First team	
21 May 2024	MF	(England) Elijah Morrison	3 years	First team	
29 May 2024	MF	(England) Joe Williams	3 years	First team	

== Pre-season and friendlies ==
On 17 May, Bristol City announced their pre-season preparations would end away to Portsmouth. A day later, the club confirmed their pre-season schedule, with fixtures against Reading, Swindon Town, Newport County, Oxford United and Exeter City. A seventh and final friendly was later confirmed, against Cheltenham Town. On July 14, the club announced they would begin pre-season with a behind closed doors friendly against Torquay United.

Win Draw Loss Fixtures

12 July 2023 Friendly	Bristol City	Cancelled	Reading	Bristol
12:30 BST				Stadium: Robins High Performance Centre
Note: Fixture was cancelled due to Reading unable to fulfil the match.

15 July 2023 Friendly	Bristol City	6–2	Torquay United	Bristol
14:00 BST	Knight; Bell; Mehmeti (x2); Cornick (x2)	Report	Ash; Jarvis	Stadium: Robins High Performance Centre; Attendance: 0 (behind closed doors)

18 July 2023 Friendly	Bristol City	7–1	Swindon Town	Bristol
12:30 BST	Bell 17', 55'; Sykes 77'; Conway 90', 92', 99', 114'	Report	Hepburn-Murphy 22'	Stadium: Robins High Performance Centre; Attendance: 0 (behind closed doors)

22 July 2023 Friendly	Bristol City	8–0	Newport County	Bristol
12:30 BST	Bell 8'; Wells 19', 37', 49', 51' (pen.); Vyner 43'; Scott 62', 90'	Report		Stadium: Robins High Performance Centre

22 July 2023 Friendly	Bristol City	4–1	Oxford United	Bristol
15:00 BST	Conway 13', 59'; Weimann 27'; Knight 49'	Report	O'Donkor 15'	Stadium: Robins High Performance Centre

25 July 2023 Friendly	Bristol City	4–0	Exeter City	Bristol
13:00 BST	Leeson 30', 80'; Wells 59'; Sykes 76'	Report		Stadium: Robins High Performance Centre

25 July 2023 Friendly	Cheltenham Town	1–1	Bristol City	Cheltenham
19:45 BST	Keena 64' (pen.)	Report	Tanner 42'	Stadium: Whaddon Road

29 July 2023 Friendly	Portsmouth	0–1	Bristol City	Milton
15:00 BST		Report	Sykes 50'	Stadium: Fratton Park

== Competitions ==
=== Overall record ===
Competition	Starting round	Final position	Record							
Competition	Starting round	Final position	Pld	W	D	L	GF	GA	GD	Win %
Championship	Matchday 1	11th	46	17	11	18	53	51	+2	36.96
FA Cup	Third round	Fourth round	4	1	3	0	3	2	+1	25.00
EFL Cup	First round	Second round	2	1	0	1	5	2	+3	50.00
Total			52	19	14	19	61	55	+6	36.54

Last updated: 4 May 2024
Source: Soccerway

=== Championship ===
==== League table ====
Pos	Team	Pld	W	D	L	GF	GA	GD	Pts
8	Middlesbrough	46	20	9	17	71	62	+9	69
9	Coventry City	46	17	13	16	70	59	+11	64
10	Preston North End	46	18	9	19	56	67	−11	63
11	Bristol City	46	17	11	18	53	51	+2	62
12	Cardiff City	46	19	5	22	53	70	−17	62
13	Millwall	46	16	11	19	45	55	−10	59
14	Swansea City	46	15	12	19	59	65	−6	57

Source: EFL official website
Rules for classification: 1) Points; 2) Goal difference; 3) Number of goals scored; 4) Head-to-head results; 5) Wins; 6) Away goals; 7) Penalty points (sec 9.5); 8) Number of 12-point sending off offences; 9) Play-off (only if needed to determine promotion/relegation)

==== Results summary ====
Overall								Home						Away					
Pld	W	D	L	GF	GA	GD	Pts	W	D	L	GF	GA	GD	W	D	L	GF	GA	GD
46	17	12	17	53	51	+2	63	11	4	8	31	21	+10	6	8	9	22	30	−8

Last updated: 4 May 2024.
Source: Soccerway

==== Results by round ====
Round	1	2	3	4	5	6	7	8	9	10	11	12	13	14	15	16	17	18	19	20	21	22	23	24	25	26	27	28	29	30	31	32	33	34	35	36	37	38	39	40	41	42	43	44	45	46
Ground	H	A	H	A	A	H	H	A	H	A	A	H	H	A	H	A	H	A	H	A	A	H	H	A	A	H	A	H	A	H	A	H	H	A	H	A	H	A	H	A	A	H	H	A	H	A
Result	D	W	L	D	W	D	W	L	L	W	L	W	L	L	W	D	W	L	L	D	L	W	W	W	D	L	L	D	D	L	W	W	L	L	L	L	W	L	W	W	D	W	D	D	W	D
Position	14	10	14	14	8	11	7	9	11	11	14	8	13	15	11	11	11	12	14	14	15	14	12	8	8	11	14	13	13	14	13	11	12	12	13	14	13	14	13	12	12	12	12	12	11	11

Updated to match(es) played on 4 May 2024. Source: Soccerway
A = Away; H = Home; W = Win; D = Draw; L = Loss

==== Matches ====
On 22 June, the EFL Championship fixtures were released.

Win Draw Loss Fixtures

5 August 2023 1	Bristol City	1–1	Preston North End	Ashton Gate
15:00 BST	Bell 47'	Report	Keane 86'; McCann (yellow card) 90'	Stadium: Ashton Gate Stadium; Attendance: 23,313; Referee: David Webb

12 August 2023 2	Millwall	0–1	Bristol City	Bermondsey
15:00 BST	Hutchinson (yellow card) 67'	Report	Williams (yellow card) 25'; Pring (yellow card) 69'; Vyner (yellow card) 88'; James 90+4'	Stadium: The Den; Attendance: 18,905; Referee: Keith Stroud

19 August 2023 3	Bristol City	0–2	Birmingham City	Ashton Gate
15:00 BST	Dickie (yellow card) 38' (yellow-red card) 76'	Report	Šunjić (yellow card) 20'; Miyoshi 45+3'; Buchanan (yellow card) 52'; Jutkiewicz 84'	Stadium: Ashton Gate Stadium; Attendance: 22,397; Referee: Sam Barrott

25 August 2023 4	Hull City	1–1	Bristol City	Kingston upon Hull
19:45 BST	Greaves (yellow card) 9'; Tufan 17'	Report	Wells 62' (yellow card) 65'; Gardner-Hickman (yellow card) 82'	Stadium: MKM Stadium; Attendance: 19,491; Referee: James Linington

2 September 2023 5	Swansea City	1–2	Bristol City	Landore
12:30 BST	Cullen 10'; Naughton (yellow card) 45+2'; Ginnelly (yellow card) 57'; Paterson (yellow card) 90'	Report	Naismith (yellow card) 45+3'; Sykes 48'; Bell 59'; Dickie (yellow card) 86'	Stadium: Swansea.com Stadium; Attendance: 16,676; Referee: Oliver Langford

16 September 2023 6	Bristol City	0–0	West Bromwich Albion	Ashton Gate
15:00 BST	Pring (yellow card) 39'; Tanner (yellow card) 54'	Report	Phillips (yellow card) 30'; Molumby (yellow card) 67'	Stadium: Ashton Gate; Attendance: 21,836; Referee: Anthony Backhouse

19 September 2023 7	Bristol City	4–1	Plymouth Argyle	Ashton Gate
19:45 BST	Bell 3'; James 8'; Sykes 33'; Wells (yellow card) 35'; Tanner (yellow card) 67'; Cornick 80'; Yeboah (yellow card) 90+3'	Report	Randell 26'; Molumby (yellow card) 67'	Stadium: Ashton Gate; Attendance: 23,017; Referee: Matt Donohue

23 September 2023 8	Leicester City	1–0	Bristol City	Leicester
15:00 BST	Faes (yellow card) 62'; Vardy 67' (pen.)	Report	Williams (yellow card) 51'; Knight (yellow card) 53'	Stadium: King Power Stadium; Attendance: 31,674; Referee: James Bell

30 September 2023 9	Bristol City	2–3	Stoke City	Ashton Gate
15:00 BST	Bell 5'; Wells 15'; Weimann (yellow card) 90+6'	Report	Léris 20'; Hakšabanović 47'; Lowe 89'; Tchamadeu (yellow card) 90+5'	Stadium: Ashton Gate Stadium; Attendance: 21,117; Referee: Jeremy Simpson

4 October 2023 10	Rotherham United	1–2	Bristol City	Rotherham
20:00 BST	Rathbone (yellow card) 43'; Blackett 86'	Report	Conway 81', 90+5'; Roberts (yellow card) 90'	Stadium: AESSEAL New York Stadium; Attendance: 9,221; Referee: Dean Whitestone

7 October 2023 11	Leeds United	2–1	Bristol City	Leeds
15:00 BST	James 37'; Piroe 53'; Rodon (yellow card) 67'	Report	Williams (yellow card) 6'; Gardner-Hickman (yellow card) 45+3'; Naismith 45+4'	Stadium: Elland Road; Attendance: 36,386; Referee: Keith Stroud

21 October 2023 12	Bristol City	1–0	Coventry City	Ashton Gate
15:00 BST	Dickie 45'; Weimann (yellow card) 55'; Yeboah (yellow card) 90+5'	Report	Eccles (yellow card) 75'; Ayari (yellow card) 81'; Dasilva (yellow card) 89'	Stadium: Ashton Gate Stadium; Attendance: 22,718; Referee: David Webb

25 October 2023 13	Bristol City	0–1	Ipswich Town	Ashton Gate
19:45 BST		Report	Jackson (yellow card) 14'; Broadhead 16'; Morsy (yellow card) 42'; Davis (yellow card) 69'; Hirst (yellow card) 77'	Stadium: Ashton Gate Stadium; Attendance: 22,784; Referee: Tom Nield

28 October 2023 14	Cardiff City	2–0	Bristol City	Leckwith
15:00 BST	Ng 33'; Colwill 90+1'; Méïté (yellow card) 54'	BBC report Sky report	Dickie (yellow card) 9'; Mehmeti (yellow card) 45'	Stadium: Cardiff City Stadium; Attendance: 25,803; Referee: Darren England (Barnsley)

4 November 2023 15	Bristol City	1–0	Sheffield Wednesday	Ashton Gate
15:00 GMT	Sykes (yellow card) 45+2'; Dickie 64'; Pring (yellow card) 67'; Gardner-Hickman (yellow card) 84'	Report	Bannan (red card) 32'; Gassama (yellow card) 42'	Stadium: Ashton Gate Stadium; Attendance: 22,322; Referee: Lewis Smith

11 November 2023 16	Queens Park Rangers	0–0	Bristol City	Shepherd's Bush
15:00 GMT	Smyth (yellow card) 63'; Field (yellow card) 67'	Report	Pring (yellow card) 59'; Knight (yellow card) 67'	Stadium: Loftus Road; Attendance: 17,540; Referee: Geoff Eltringham

25 November 2023 17	Bristol City	3–2	Middlesbrough	Ashton Gate
15:00 GMT	Gardner-Hickman 37', (yellow card) 42'; Conway 45+1' (pen.); Sykes 67'; Pring (yellow card) 77'	Report	Fry (yellow card) 44'; Vyner 50' (o.g.); Crooks 52'; Greenwood (yellow card) 63'	Stadium: Ashton Gate Stadium; Attendance: 21,694; Referee: John Busby

29 November 2023 18	Southampton	1–0	Bristol City	Southampton
19:45 GMT	Armstrong (yellow card) 6'; Walker-Peters (yellow card) 15' (goal) 47'; Manning (yellow card) 45+2'	Report	Vyner (yellow card) 85'	Stadium: St Mary's Stadium; Attendance: 28,047; Referee: Keith Stroud

3 December 2023 19	Bristol City	1–2	Norwich City	Ashton Gate
13:30 GMT	Knight 34'; Tanner (yellow card) 72'	Report	Duffy (yellow card) 26'; Tanner 59' (o.g.); Idah 90+5'	Stadium: Ashton Gate Stadium; Attendance: 20,424; Referee: Gavin Ward

9 December 2023 20	Huddersfield Town	1–1	Bristol City	Huddersfield
15:00 GMT	Burgzorg 24'; Pearson (yellow card) 80'	Report	Conway 46' (yellow card) 82'	Stadium: John Smith's Stadium; Attendance: 17,429; Referee: Andy Davies

12 December 2023 21	Blackburn Rovers	2–1	Bristol City	Blackburn
19:45 GMT	Carter (yellow card) 22'; Sigurðsson 35'; Wharton 52'; Brittain (yellow card) 85'; Szmodics (yellow card) 88'; Travis (yellow card) 89'	Report	Knight (yellow card) 51'; Sykes 60'	Stadium: Ewood Park; Attendance: 11,092; Referee: James Linington

16 December 2023 22	Bristol City	1–0	Sunderland	Bristol
15:00 GMT	Conway (yellow card) 1' (goal) 20' (pen.); Dickie (yellow card) 35'; Williams (yellow card) 70'	Report	Bellingham (yellow card) 69'; Roberts (yellow card) 85'; Ballard (yellow card) 90+4'	Stadium: Ashton Gate Stadium; Attendance: 22,701; Referee: Steve Martin

22 December 2023 23	Bristol City	3–2	Hull City	Bristol
19:45 GMT	Conway 25' (pen.); Tanner (yellow card) 39'; Vyner (yellow card) 42'; Mehmeti 76'; Knight 84'	Report	Seri (yellow card) 7'; Connolly 30'; Tufan 42' (pen.); Allsop (yellow card) 53'; Greaves (yellow card) 72'	Stadium: Ashton Gate Stadium; Attendance: 20,816; Referee: Ben Toner

26 December 2023 24	Watford	1–4	Bristol City	Watford
15:00 GMT	Chakvetadze 49'; Hoedt (yellow card) 80'	Report	Pring 28'; Hoedt 45+2' (o.g.); Sykes 50'; Weimann 83'	Stadium: Vicarage Road; Attendance: 19,626; Referee: John Busby

29 December 2023 25	Birmingham City	0–0	Bristol City	Bordesley
19:45 GMT		Report		Stadium: St Andrew's; Attendance: 21,231; Referee: Geoff Eltringham

1 January 2024 26	Bristol City	0–1	Millwall	Bristol
15:00 GMT	Williams (yellow card) 90+7'	Report	Norton-Cuffy (yellow card) 74'; Hutchinson 90+2'; Leonard (yellow card) 90+7'	Stadium: Ashton Gate Stadium; Attendance: 21,755; Referee: Tom Nield

13 January 2024 27	Preston North End	2–0	Bristol City	Preston
15:00 GMT	Keane (yellow card) 57' (goal) 65', 77'	Report	Pring (yellow card) 50'; Cornick (yellow card) 90+5'	Stadium: Deepdale; Attendance: 14,929; Referee: Sam Barrott

20 January 2024 28	Bristol City	1–1	Watford	Bristol
15:00 GMT	Twine 25'; McCrorie (yellow card) 36'	Report	Dele-Bashiru 13' (pen.); Asprilla (yellow card) 14'; Andrews (yellow card) 40'	Stadium: Ashton Gate Stadium; Attendance: 23,611; Referee: Andrew Kitchen

30 January 2024 29	Coventry City	2–2	Bristol City	Coventry
19:45 GMT	Sakamoto 27'; Simms 86'; van Ewijk (yellow card) 90+1'	Report	Dickie 45+1'; Wells 83'; Pring (yellow card) 85'; McCrorie (yellow card) 90+3'	Stadium: The Coventry Building Society Arena; Attendance: 22,724; Referee: Leigh Doughty
Note: Fixture was originally scheduled for 27 January, but was postponed due to Coventry's FA Cup involvement.

2 February 2024 30	Bristol City	0–1	Leeds United	Bristol
20:00 GMT	Dickie (yellow card) 63'	Report	Gnonto 48'	Stadium: Ashton Gate Stadium; Attendance: 25,429; Referee: Stephen Martin

10 February 2024 31	Middlesbrough	1–2	Bristol City	Middlesbrough
15:00 GMT	Barlaser (yellow card) 73'; Silvera 90+1'	Report	Knight 16'; James 17'	Stadium: Riverside Stadium; Attendance: 24,881; Referee: Sam Allison

13 February 2024 32	Bristol City	3–1	Southampton	Bristol
20:00 GMT	Bell 52'; Vyner (yellow card) 65'; Dickie 72'; Cornick 82'; Williams (yellow card) 90+4'	Report	Fraser (yellow card) 90+2'; Armstrong 90+5'; Sulemana (yellow card) 90+6'	Stadium: Ashton Gate; Attendance: 24,661; Referee: Matt Donohue
Note: Live on Sky Sports.

17 February 2024 33	Bristol City	0–1	Queens Park Rangers	Bristol
15:00 GMT		Report	Hayden (yellow card) 37'; Chair 41'	Stadium: Ashton Gate; Attendance: 23,619; Referee: Sam Barrott

24 February 2024 34	Sheffield Wednesday	2–1	Bristol City	Owlerton
15:00 GMT	Ugbo 16', 45'; Bernard (yellow card) 29' (yellow-red card) 78'; Johnson (yellow card) 70'	Report	Knight 25'; Dickie (yellow card) 34'; Gardner-Hickman (yellow card) 53'; Roberts (yellow card) 61'	Stadium: Hillsborough Stadium; Attendance: 26,328; Referee: Thomas Kirk

2 March 2024 35	Bristol City	0–1	Cardiff City	Bristol
12:30 GMT	King (yellow card) 48'; Gardner-Hickman (yellow card) 76'	Report	Etete (yellow card) 15'; Ng 66'; Wilson-Esbrand (yellow card) 67'	Stadium: Ashton Gate Stadium; Attendance: 24,035; Referee: Sam Allison

5 March 2024 36	Ipswich Town	3–2	Bristol City	Ipswich
20:00 GMT	Al-Hamadi 62', (penalty missed) 86', (yellow card) 90+1'; Chaplin 80'; Davis 89'	Report	Mehmeti 54'; Conway 77'; McCrorie (yellow card) 79'; O'Leary (yellow card) 85'; Pring (yellow card) 90+3'	Stadium: Portman Road; Attendance: 28,001; Referee: David Webb

10 March 2024 37	Bristol City	1–0	Swansea City	Bristol
12:30 GMT	Sykes (yellow card) 71'; Dickie 79'; Wells (yellow card) 88'	Report	Tymon (yellow card) 63'	Stadium: Ashton Gate Stadium; Attendance: 20,995; Referee: Matt Donohue

16 March 2024 38	West Bromwich Albion	2–0	Bristol City	West Bromwich
15:00 GMT	Townsend (yellow card) 28'; Fellows 45'; Wallace 50'; Yokuşlu (yellow card) 71'; Kipré (yellow card) 85'; Palmer (yellow card) 90+1'	Report	Knight (yellow card) 45+1'; Gardner-Hickman (yellow card) 58'	Stadium: The Hawthorns; Attendance: 25,254; Referee: Tom Nield

29 March 2024 39	Bristol City	1–0	Leicester City	Bristol
12:30 GMT	Mehmeti 73'; Wells (yellow card) 82'; Sykes (yellow card) 88'	Report		Stadium: Ashton Gate Stadium; Attendance: 25,857; Referee: Andrew Kitchen
Note: Fixture was initially scheduled for a 15:00 kick-off, but was moved for live Sky Sports broadcasting.

1 April 2024 40	Plymouth Argyle	0–1	Bristol City	Plymouth
15:00 BST	Devine (yellow card) 54' (yellow-red card) 78'; Gibson (yellow card) 62'; Houhgton (yellow card) 90'	Report	Twine (yellow card) 28'; Wells 57' (yellow card) 90+6'; Pring (yellow card) 88'	Stadium: Home Park; Attendance: 16,866; Referee: Keith Stroud

6 April 2024 41	Sunderland	0–0	Bristol City	Sunderland
15:00 BST	Hume (yellow card) 62'	Report	Roberts (yellow card) 70'	Stadium: Stadium of Light; Attendance: 40,298; Referee: Leigh Doughty

10 April 2024 42	Bristol City	5–0	Blackburn Rovers	Bristol
19:45 BST	Conway 24', 32' (pen.); Mehmeti 73'; Wells 78' (pen.), 90+6'	Report	Rankin-Costello (yellow card) 29'; McFadzean (yellow card) 77'	Stadium: Ashton Gate; Attendance: 19,672; Referee: Bobby Madley

13 April 2024 43	Bristol City	1–1	Huddersfield Town	Bristol
15:00 BST	Roberts (yellow card) 64'; Wells 90+11' (pen.)	Report	Spencer (yellow card) 7'; Matos (yellow card) 12'; Helik (yellow card) 42'; Pearson (yellow card) 71'; Koroma 81'; Nicholls (yellow card) 90+9'; Rudoni (yellow card) 90+9'	Stadium: Ashton Gate; Attendance: 21,819; Referee: Rebecca Welch

20 April 2024 44	Norwich City	1–1	Bristol City	Norwich
15:00 BST	Sainz 58'; McLean (yellow card) 90+5'	Report	Roberts 55'; Williams (yellow card) 90+2'; Mehmeti (yellow card) 90+4'	Stadium: Carrow Road; Attendance: 26,295; Referee: Sam Barrott

27 April 2024 45	Bristol City	2–0	Rotherham United	Bristol
15:00 BST	Conway 32' (pen.); Twine 57'; Williams (yellow card) 83'	Report	Phillips (yellow card) 31'; Eaves (yellow card) 67'	Stadium: Ashton Gate; Attendance: 22,873; Referee: Charles Breakspear

4 May 2024 46	Stoke City	4–0	Bristol City	Stoke-on-Trent
12:30 BST	Cundle 25'; Campbell 45'; Manhoef 45+2', 49'	Report		Stadium: bet365 Stadium; Attendance: 28,243; Referee: Sam Barrott

=== FA Cup ===
The club entered the competition in the third round and were drawn away to West Ham United.

Win Draw Loss Fixtures

7 January 2024 Third round	West Ham United	1–1	Bristol City	Stratford
14:00 GMT	Bowen 4'; Álvarez (yellow card) 45+5'; Ward-Prowse (yellow card) 53'	Report	Williams (yellow card) 33'; Conway (yellow card) 35', (goal) 61'; Pring (yellow card) 60'	Stadium: London Stadium; Attendance: 62,477; Referee: Graham Scott

16 January 2024 Third round replay	Bristol City	1–0	West Ham United	Bristol
19:45 GMT	Conway 3'; Williams (yellow card) 50'; Gardner-Hickman (yellow card) 63'	Report	Benrahma (red card) 51'; Cresswell (yellow card) 64'	Stadium: Ashton Gate Stadium; Attendance: 25,616; Referee: Darren England

26 January 2024 Fourth round	Bristol City	0–0	Nottingham Forest	Bristol
19:45 GMT	Pring (yellow card) 20'; James (yellow card) 40'; Gardner-Hickman (yellow card) 90+1'	Report	Yates (yellow card) 30'; Domínguez (yellow card) 34'	Stadium: Ashton Gate Stadium; Attendance: 25,787; Referee: Stuart Attwell

7 February 2024 Fourth round replay	Nottingham Forest	1–1 (a.e.t.) (5–3 p)	Bristol City	West Bridgford
19:45 GMT	Origi 8'	Report	Knight 11'; Conway (yellow card) 58'	Stadium: City Ground; Attendance: 27,754; Referee: Michael Salisbury
	Penalties
	Gibbs-White (penalty scored); Hudson-Odoi (penalty scored); Williams (penalty scored); Niakhaté (penalty scored); Awoniyi (penalty scored)		(penalty scored) Cornick; (penalty missed) Bell; (penalty scored) Wells; (penalty scored) Mehmeti

=== EFL Cup ===
Bristol City were drawn at home to Oxford United in the first round and to Norwich City in the second round.

Win Draw Loss Fixtures

9 August 2023 First round	Bristol City	5–1	Oxford United	Ashton Gate
19:45 BST	Cornick 15'; Knight 35', 47'; Wells 51'; Dickie (yellow card) 55'; Naismith 62'; Roberts (yellow card) 90+7'	Report	Bodin 30'; Brown (yellow card) 45+4'; Murphy (yellow card) 70'; Rodrigues (yellow card) 89'	Stadium: Ashton Gate Stadium; Attendance: 9,661; Referee: Ollie Yates

29 August 2023 Second round	Bristol City	0–1	Norwich City	Ashton Gate
19:45 BST		Report	Płacheta 49'	Stadium: Ashton Gate Stadium; Attendance: 9,408; Referee: Samuel Allison
