= Marley Rose (footballer) =

English footballer

Personal information
- Date of birth: 29 December 2002 (age 23)
- Position: Midfielder

Youth career
- Southampton
- Yeovil Town
- Bristol Rovers
- –2025: Bristol City

Senior career*
Years	Team	Apps	(Gls)
2023–2025	Bristol City	0	(0)
2023	→ Bath City (loan)	4	(0)
2024	→ Taunton Town (loan)	5	(0)
2024–2025	→ Weston-super-Mare (loan)	5	(0)
2025–	Taunton Town		
- * Club domestic league appearances and goals as of 23:42 4 June 2025 (UTC)

Marley Rose (born 29 December 2002) is an English footballer who plays as a midfielder for Taunton Town.

== Career ==
Born in Bristol, he grew up in Whitchurch and had spells with Southampton, Yeovil Town and Bristol Rovers before joining Bristol City at Under-16s level. In March 2023 it was revealed that Rose had signed a professional contract with Bristol City, agreeing a two-year contract until the summer of 2025.

He had loan spells with Bath City and Taunton Town prior to joining Weston-super-Mare A.F.C. on a season-long loan in September 2024. However, after making a few appearances he suffered an injury and the loan was cut short, with him returning to Bristol City to continue his rehabilitation in January 2025.

Rose was released from Bristol City on 1 July 2025. The following month, he signed on a free transfer for Taunton Town.
