= Duncan Idehen =

English footballer

Personal information
- Full name: Duncan Nosahaere Idehen
- Date of birth: 3 July 2002 (age 24)
- Height: 6 ft 2 in (1.87 m)
- Position: Defender

Team information
- Current team: Worcester City

Youth career
- Norwich City
- –2019: Lincoln City
- 2019–2020: Grimsby Town

Senior career*
Years	Team	Apps	(Gls)
2020–2021	Grimsby Town	6	(0)
2021–2022	Birmingham City	0	(0)
2022–2024	Bristol City	2	(0)
2022	→ Carlisle United (loan)	2	(0)
2023	→ Yeovil Town (loan)	2	(0)
2024	→ Bath City (loan)	4	(0)
2024–2025	Derry City	3	(0)
2025	→ Ballymena United (loan)	3	(0)
2025–2026	St Ives Town	39	(2)
2026	Farnborough	0	(0)
2026–	Worcester City	4	(0)
- * Club domestic league appearances and goals as of 09:57, 17 September 2026 (UTC)

Duncan Nosahaere Idehen (born 3 July 2002) is an English professional footballer who plays as a defender for Worcester City.

Having played at academy level for Norwich City, Idehen joined Lincoln City where as well as being a youth team player he appeared twice on the substitute for the first team. In 2019 he joined Grimsby Town and made his full professional debut on the opening day of the 2020–21 season. In January 2022 he joined Bristol City on a six-month contract having briefly featured for Birmingham City in their Premier League 2 campaign. He has since spent time on loan with Carlisle United, Yeovil Town and Bath City.

== Career ==
=== Early career ===
Having previously played for the academy at Norwich City he joined Lincoln City. During the 2018–19 season although being part of the Imps academy he was named as a substitute in two first team games in the EFL Trophy defeats against Wolverhampton Wanderers and Accrington Stanley.

=== Grimsby Town ===
Idehen moved across Lincolnshire and joined Grimsby Town's academy in 2019. He was offered a professional contract by the club in summer 2020. Idehen made his debut for the club on 8 September 2020, starting a 2–2 EFL Trophy draw with Harrogate Town. He made his league debut on 12 September 2020, starting in a 1–0 League Two defeat away to Walsall. Following on from Grimsby's relegation from the Football League at the end of the 2020–21 season, Idehen was transfer listed by manager Paul Hurst with the player being made available subject to a sell on clause being activated in any potential deal. On 21 October 2021, having not featured for the first team during the 2021–22 season, Idehen was released from his contract by mutual consent.

=== Bristol City ===
Following a brif spell with Birmingham City's under-23 side, he joined EFL Championship club Bristol City on a six-month contract on 1 January 2022. Idehen was added to the Robins first team on the 13 February 2022, given the squad number 31 he was named as a substitute in a 3-1 defeat against Swansea City. On 18 August 2022, Idehen joined Carlisle United on a half-season loan. He scored his first professional goal in an EFL Trophy tie with Fleetwood Town on 20 September 2022, scoring an equaliser in the 90th minute to take the game to penalties in which Carlisle would go on to win. On 15 November 2023, Idehen joined National League South side Yeovil Town on loan until the end of January 2024. On 22 March 2024, Idehen joined National League South side Bath City on loan until the end of the 2023–24 season.

=== Derry City ===
On 23 August 2024, Idehen signed for League of Ireland Premier Division club Derry City. On 3 February 2025, he joined NIFL Premiership club Ballymena United on loan until the summer.

=== Move to Non-League ===
After spending the 2025–26 season with St Ives Town, Idehen agreed to join National League South side, Farnborough in June 2026.

On 14 August 2026, despite having signed for Farnborough just two months earlier, Idehen joined Southern League Premier Division Central side Worcester City.

== Personal life ==
Born in England, Idehen is of Nigerian descent.

== Career statistics ==
As of match played 22 August 2026

Appearances and goals by club, season and competition
Club	Season	League			National Cup		League Cup		Other		Total	
Club	Season	Division	Apps	Goals	Apps	Goals	Apps	Goals	Apps	Goals	Apps	Goals
Grimsby Town	2020–21	League Two	6	0	0	0	0	0	2 (Note: Appearance(s) in EFL Trophy)	0	8	0
Grimsby Town	2021–22	National League	0	0	0	0	—		0	0	0	0
Grimsby Town	Total		6	0	0	0	0	0	2	0	8	0
Birmingham City	2021–22	Championship	0	0	0	0	0	0	—		0	0
Bristol City	2021–22	Championship	2	0	0	0	0	0	—		2	0
Bristol City	2022–23	Championship	0	0	0	0	0	0	—		0	0
Bristol City	2023–24	Championship	0	0	0	0	0	0	—		0	0
Bristol City	Total		2	0	0	0	0	0	—		2	0
Carlisle United (loan)	2022–23	League Two	2	0	0	0	0	0	3	1	5	1
Yeovil Town (loan)	2023–24	National League South	2	0	1	0	—		1 (Note: Appearances in FA Trophy)	0	4	0
Bath City (loan)	2023–24	National League South	4	0	—		—		0	0	4	0
Derry City	2024	LOI Premier Division	3	0	0	0	—		—		3	0
Derry City	2025	LOI Premier Division	0	0	0	0	—		—		0	0
Derry City	Total		0	0	0	0	—		—		0	0
Ballymena United (loan)	2024–25	NIFL Premiership	3	0	—		—		—		3	0
St Ives Town	2025–26	Southern League Premier Division Central	39	2	1	0	—		2	0	42	2
Farnborough	2026–27	National League South	0	0	0	0	—		0	0	0	0
Worcester City	2026–27	Southern League Premier Division Central	1	0	0	0	—		0	0	1	0
Career total			62	2	2	0	0	0	8	1	72	3
