= James Morton (footballer, born 1999) =

English footballer

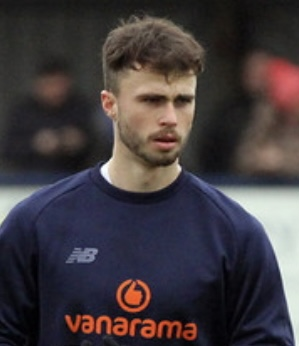
- Morton in 2023

Personal information
- Full name: James Samuel Morton
- Date of birth: 22 April 1999 (age 27)
- Place of birth: Bristol, England
- Position: Defensive midfielder

Team information
- Current team: Bath City
- Number: 8

Youth career
- 2013–2017: Bristol City

Senior career*
Years	Team	Apps	(Gls)
2017–2023	Bristol City	0	(0)
2017	→ Chippenham Town (loan)	2	(1)
2017–2018	→ Bath City (loan)	16	(0)
2018–2019	→ Bath City (loan)	34	(1)
2019–2020	→ Forest Green Rovers (loan)	12	(0)
2020	→ Grimsby Town (loan)	7	(0)
2021	→ Gillingham (loan)	1	(0)
2022–2023	→ Bath City (loan)	34	(2)
2023	Weston-super-Mare	20	(3)
2023–2026	Southend United	94	(1)
2026–	Bath City	4	(0)
- * Club domestic league appearances and goals as of 13:26, 6 September 2026 (UTC)

James Samuel Morton (born 22 April 1999) is an English professional footballer who plays as a defensive midfielder for Southern League Premier Division South club Bath City.

He has played in the Football League for Bristol City, Forest Green Rovers, Grimsby Town and Gillingham.

== Career ==
=== Bristol City ===
Morton joined Bristol City aged 14 and progressed through the club's youth system. He was loaned out to Chippenham Town in October 2017 and then Bath City on loan until 13 January 2018, before extending his loan to the end of the season. In the summer of 2018, he re-joined Bath City on loan for the 2018–19 season, and won their 'Goal of the season' award for that season. After signing a four-year deal with Bristol City in summer 2019, Morton joined Forest Green Rovers on a season-long loan, making his EFL League Two debut when he played the entire match against Oldham Athletic on the opening day of the 2019–20 season.

On 30 September 2020, Morton joined Grimsby Town on a season-long loan. On 31 December 2020, following the departure of manager Ian Holloway, Morton and fellow Bristol City teammate Owura Edwards were recalled from their loan spells at Grimsby. Morton made only four starts during his time at Blundell Park.

On 1 February 2021, Morton joined League One side Gillingham on loan for the remainder of the 2020–21 season. Morton would only feature once for the Gills, appearing as a 91st-minute substitute in a 3–0 home defeat by Lincoln City on 5 February 2021.

In July 2021, Bristol City allowed Morton to join Milton Keynes Dons on trial with a view to a permanent transfer, however after playing in a 7–1 pre-season victory over Coventry City the transfer fell through following a change of management at MK.

On 23 September 2022, Morton returned to National League South club Bath City on loan until the end of the 2022–23 season.

In May 2023, Morton was released by Bristol City.

=== Weston-super-Mare ===
On 9 August 2023, Morton signed a contract for National League South club Weston-super-Mare.

=== Southend United ===
On 29 December 2023, Morton signed a two-and-a-half-year deal with National League club Southend United. He was released by the club when his contract expired at the end of the 2025-26 season.

=== Bath City ===
On 7 August 2026, having previously had three separate loan spells with the club, Morton returned to Bath City on a permanent basis, now playing in the Southern League Premier Division South following their relegation the previous season.

== Personal life ==
Morton is a Christian.

== Career statistics ==
As of match played 5 September 2026

Appearances and goals by club, season and competition
Club	Season	League			FA Cup		League Cup		Other		Total	
Club	Season	Division	Apps	Goals	Apps	Goals	Apps	Goals	Apps	Goals	Apps	Goals
Bristol City	2017–18	Championship	0	0	0	0	0	0	—		0	0
Bristol City	2018–19	Championship	0	0	0	0	0	0	—		0	0
Bristol City	2019–20	Championship	0	0	0	0	0	0	—		0	0
Bristol City	2020–21	Championship	0	0	0	0	1	0	—		1	0
Bristol City	2021–22	Championship	0	0	0	0	0	0	—		0	0
Bristol City	2022–23	Championship	0	0	0	0	0	0	—		0	0
Bristol City	Total		0	0	0	0	1	0	—		1	0
Chippenham Town (loan)	2017–18	National League South	2	1	0	0	—		1 (Note: Appearance in Wiltshire FA Senior Cup)	0	3	1
Bath City (loan)	2017–18	National League South	16	0	0	0	—		0	0	16	0
Bath City (loan)	2018–19	National League South	34	1	1	0	—		3 (Note: One appearance in FA Trophy, one appearance in Somerset Premier Cup, one appearance in National League South play-offs)	0	38	1
Forest Green Rovers (loan)	2019–20	League Two	12	0	0	0	2	0	3 (Note: Appearance(s) in the EFL Trophy)	0	17	0
Grimsby Town (loan)	2020–21	League Two	7	0	1	0	0	0	1	0	9	0
Gillingham (loan)	2020–21	League One	1	0	0	0	0	0	0	0	1	0
Bath City (loan)	2022–23	National League South	34	2	1	0	—		8 (Note: Three appearances in FA Trophy, five appearances in Somerset Premier Cup)	0	43	2
Weston-super-Mare	2023–24	National League South	20	3	3	0	—		3 (Note: Two appearances in FA Trophy, one appearance in Somerset Premier Cup)	0	26	3
Southend United	2023–24	National League	17	1	—		—		—		17	1
Southend United	2024–25	National League	43	0	2	0	—		3 (Note: Appearances in FA Trophy)	0	48	0
Southend United	2025–26	National League	34	0	1	0	—		6 (Note: Five appearances in FA Trophy, one appearance in National League play-offs)	0	41	0
Southend United	Total		94	1	3	0	—		9	0	106	1
Bath City	2026–27	Southern League; Premier Division South	4	0	1	0	—		0	0	5	0
Career total			224	8	10	0	3	0	28	0	265	8

== Honours ==
Southend United

- FA Trophy: 2025–26
