= James Taylor (footballer) =

English footballer

Personal information
- Date of birth: 30 November 2001 (age 24)
- Position: Defender

Team information
- Current team: Yate Town

Youth career
- Bristol City

Senior career*
Years	Team	Apps	(Gls)
2020–2023	Bristol City	0	(0)
2020	→ Bath City (loan)	5	(0)
2022	→ Cheltenham Town (loan)	0	(0)
2023–2024	Truro City	4	(0)
2024	→ Yate Town (loan)	18	(3)
2024–	Yate Town	24	(2)
- * Club domestic league appearances and goals as of 16:01, 24 January 2025 (UTC)

James Taylor (born 30 November 2001) is an English professional footballer who plays for Yate Town, as a defender.

== Career ==
Taylor began his career with Bristol City, moving on loan to Bath City in September 2020, and on loan to Cheltenham Town in July 2022. In May 2023, it was announced that Taylor would be released by Bristol City at the end of the season.

On 15 September 2023, Taylor signed for National League South club Truro City. After initially joining Yate Town on loan, he signed for the club permanently in summer 2024.

== Career statistics ==
As of match played 18 October 2022

Appearances and goals by club, season and competition
Club	Season	League			FA Cup		EFL Cup		Other		Total	
Club	Season	Division	Apps	Goals	Apps	Goals	Apps	Goals	Apps	Goals	Apps	Goals
Bristol City	2020–21	Championship	0	0	0	0	0	0	—		0	0
Bristol City	2021–22	Championship	0	0	0	0	0	0	—		0	0
Bristol City	2022–23	Championship	0	0	0	0	0	0	—		0	0
Bristol City	Total		0	0	0	0	0	0	0	0	0	0
Bath City (loan)	2020–21	National League South	5	0	0	0	—		2 (Note: Appearances in FA Trophy)	0	7	0
Cheltenham Town (loan)	2022–23	League One	0	0	0	0	1	0	2 (Note: Appearances in EFL Trophy)	0	3	0
Career total			5	0	0	0	1	0	4	0	10	0
