= Tommy Conway =

Scotland international footballer (born 2002)

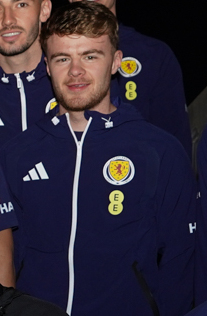
- Conway with Scotland in 2026

Personal information
- Full name: Tommy Daniel John Conway
- Date of birth: 6 August 2002 (age 24)
- Place of birth: Taunton, Scotland
- Height: 6 ft 1 in (1.85 m)
- Position: Forward

Team information
- Current team: Middlesbrough
- Number: 9

Youth career
- 2009–2020: Bristol City

Senior career*
Years	Team	Apps	(Gls)
2019–2024	Bristol City	82	(20)
2019–2020	→ Yate Town (loan)	12	(2)
2020–2021	→ Bath City (loan)	11	(4)
2024–	Middlesbrough	91	(27)

International career^{‡}
2022–2024	Scotland U21	7	(3)
2024–	Scotland	8	(0)
- * Club domestic league appearances and goals as of 17:34, 17 October 2026 (UTC) ‡ National team caps and goals as of 23:16, 9 June 2025 (UTC)

Tommy Daniel John Conway (born 6 August 2002) is a professional footballer who plays as a forward for EFL Championship club Middlesbrough and the Scotland national team.

== Club career ==
=== Bristol City ===
Conway joined the youth academy of Bristol City at the age of 7. He began his senior career on loan with Yate Town in 2019–20, before joining Bath City on loan in October 2020. Aged 19, he made his professional debut with Bristol City in a 3–1 Championship loss away to Coventry City on 5 April 2021. He scored his first professional goal in a 4–1 away loss to Millwall on 1 May 2021.

Conway broke into the first-team at the start of the 2022–23 season, and was rewarded with the EFL Young Player of the Month award for August 2022. He ended the season with 12 goals in all competitions.

Conway scored an equalising goal in a 2023–24 FA Cup third round match against West Ham United at London Stadium, then scored the only goal of the replay at Ashton Gate. He again ended the season with 12 goals to his name. He was also given the club's Young Player of the Year award.

=== Middlesbrough ===
On 16 August 2024, Conway joined Middlesbrough for £4.5 million.

== International career ==
Conway was born in Taunton, England. He qualifies to play for Scotland through his paternal grandfather, who was born in Stirling.

He was first selected for the Scotland under-21 squad in September 2022. He scored his first international goal on 18 June 2023, in a 1–1 friendly home draw against Norway.

On 4 June 2024, Conway received his first call-up to the Scotland senior national team, being included in the provisional squad for UEFA Euro 2024 by manager Steve Clarke, following withdrawals by Lyndon Dykes and Ben Doak due to injury. He made his full international debut three days later, coming on for Lawrence Shankland in the 63rd minute of a 2–2 friendly draw against Finland. He was included in the final squad for the aforementioned tournament in Germany, but did not make an appearance as Scotland were eliminated at the group stage.

== Career statistics ==
=== Club ===
As of match played 17 October 2026

Appearances and goals by club, season and competition
Club	Season	League			FA Cup		League Cup		Other		Total	
Club	Season	Division	Apps	Goals	Apps	Goals	Apps	Goals	Apps	Goals	Apps	Goals
Bristol City	2019–20	Championship	0	0	0	0	0	0	—		0	0
Bristol City	2020–21	Championship	5	1	—		0	0	—		5	1
Bristol City	2021–22	Championship	4	0	1	0	1	0	—		6	0
Bristol City	2022–23	Championship	34	9	1	0	3	3	—		38	12
Bristol City	2023–24	Championship	39	10	4	2	0	0	—		43	12
Bristol City	Total		82	20	6	2	4	3	0	0	92	25
Yate Town (loan)	2019–20	SL Premier Division South	12	2	—		—		—		12	2
Bath City (loan)	2020–21	National League South	11	4	2	2	—		3 (Note: Appearances in FA Trophy)	3	16	9
Middlesbrough	2024–25	Championship	36	13	0	0	1	0	—		37	13
Middlesbrough	2025–26	Championship	46	13	1	0	1	0	2 (Note: Appearances in EFL Championship play-offs)	0	50	13
Middlesbrough	2026–27	Championship	9	1	0	0	1	0	0	0	10	1
Middlesbrough	Total		91	27	1	0	3	0	2	0	88	27
Career total			196	53	9	4	7	3	5	3	217	63

== Honours ==
Individual

- EFL Young Player of the Month: August 2022
- Bristol City Young Player of the Year: 2023–24
