= Omar Taylor-Clarke =

Welsh footballer (born 2003)

Personal information
- Full name: Omar Rivaldo Taylor-Clarke
- Date of birth: 10 December 2003 (age 22)
- Place of birth: Newport, Wales
- Position: Midfielder

Team information
- Current team: Yate Town

Youth career
- Cardiff City
- Bristol City

Senior career*
Years	Team	Apps	(Gls)
2022–2025	Bristol City	6	(0)
2022	→ Yate Town (loan)	5	(0)
2024	→ Weston-super-Mare (loan)	2	(0)
2025	Dunfermline Athletic	2	(0)
2026-	Yate Town (loan)		
- * Club domestic league appearances and goals as of 23:22, 28 December 2025 (UTC)

Omar Rivaldo Taylor-Clarke (born 10 December 2003) is a Welsh professional footballer who plays as a midfielder for Yate Town.

== Early life ==
Born in Newport, Wales to Welsh and Caribbean parents, Taylor-Clarke was given the middle name Rivaldo due to his father's fondness for the Brazilian World Cup winner.

== Career ==
Taylor-Clarke left the Cardiff City academy to join Bristol City from under-13 level. In October 2022 he signed a professional contract until 2025 with Bristol City. Taylor-Clarke was loaned to Yate Town in 2022 and he scored on his debut, a 6–0 friendly win over Cinderford Town.

He was in the first team matchday squad for Bristol City on 8 January 2023 in a 1–1 FA Cup draw against Swansea City at Ashton Gate. He was on the bench again for the Championship match a week later against Birmingham City on 14 January 2023. He made his Bristol City debut on 17 January 2023 in the FA Cup third round replay replay against Swansea City as an extra time substitute as Bristol City won 2–1. He started his first league game, also against Swansea, in March 2023 and Bristol City manager Nigel Pearson described it as an "outstanding" full debut.

On 9 March 2024, Taylor-Clarke joined National League South club Weston-super-Mare on loan until the end of the season.

On 3 February 2025, he signed for Scottish Championship club Dunfermline Athletic on a permanent deal. He made his debut for the club on 5 February 2025 in a 0-2 Scottish Challenge Cup home defeat to Livingstone. He later rejoined Yate Town.

== Career statistics ==
As of match played 16 March 2024

Appearances and goals by club, season and competition
Club	Season	League			National Cup (Note: Includes FA Cup)		League Cup (Note: Includes EFL Cup)		Other		Total	
Club	Season	Division	Apps	Goals	Apps	Goals	Apps	Goals	Apps	Goals	Apps	Goals
Bristol City	2022–23	Championship	6	0	3	0	0	0	—		9	0
Bristol City	2023–24	Championship	0	0	0	0	0	0	—		0	0
Bristol City	2024–25	Championship	0	0	0	0	0	0	—		0	0
Bristol City	Total		6	0	3	0	0	0	—		9	0
Yate Town (loan)	2022–23	Southern League; Premier Division South	5	0	0	0	—		0	0	5	0
Weston-super-Mare (loan)	2023–24	National League South	2	0	0	0	—		0	0	2	0
Dunfermline Athletic	2024–25	Scottish Championship	0	0	0	0	—		0	0	0	0
Career total			13	0	3	0	0	0	0	0	16	0
