= Andreas Weimann =

Austrian footballer (born 1991)

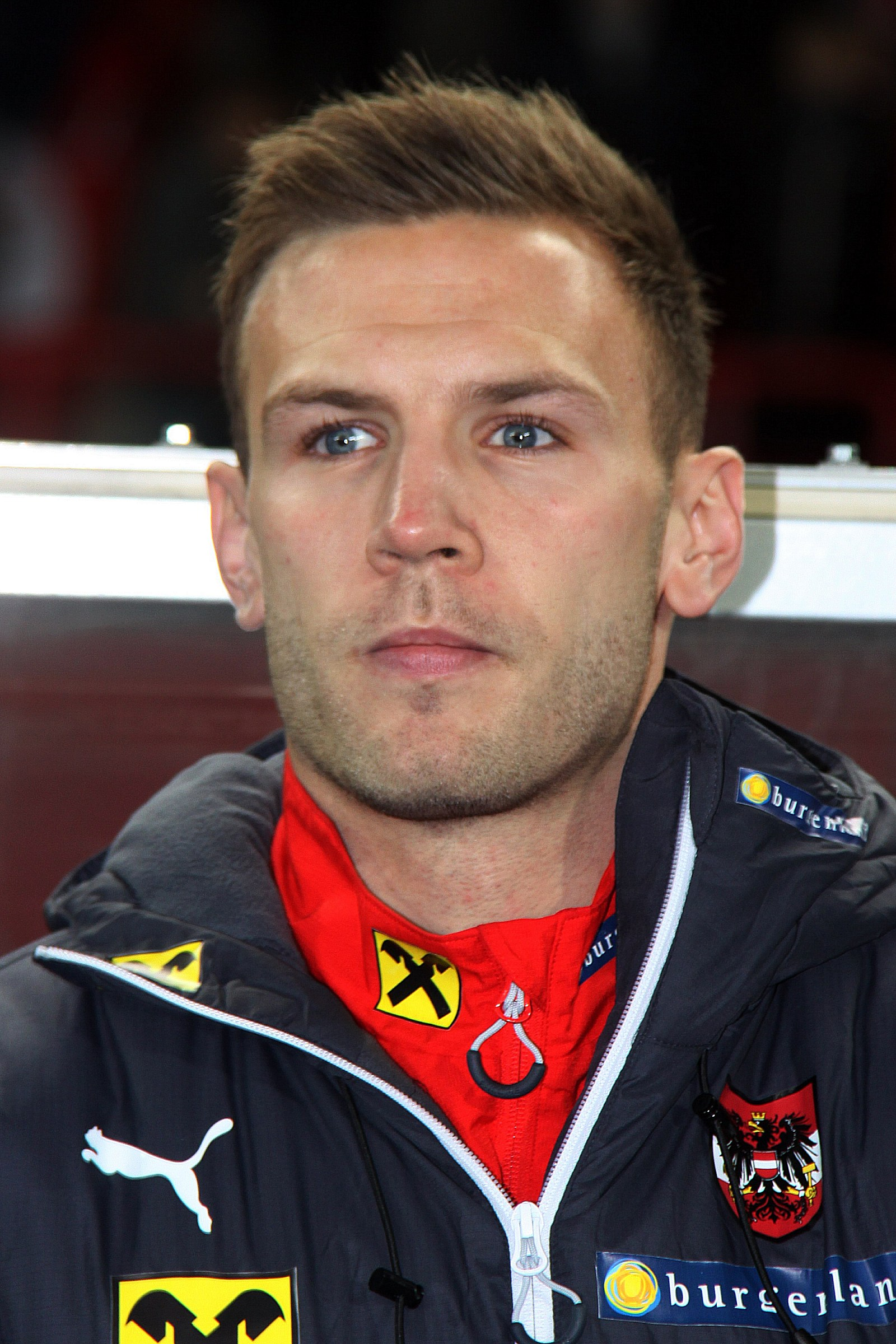
- Weimann with Austria in 2014

Personal information
- Full name: Andreas Weimann
- Date of birth: 5 August 1991 (age 35)
- Place of birth: Vienna, Austria
- Height: 1.79 m (5 ft 10 in)
- Positions: Forward; attacking midfielder

Team information
- Current team: Cheltenham Town
- Number: 18

Youth career
- 1998–2005: Stadlau
- 2005–2007: Rapid Wien
- 2007–2010: Aston Villa

Senior career*
Years	Team	Apps	(Gls)
2010–2015	Aston Villa	113	(17)
2011	→ Watford (loan)	18	(4)
2011	→ Watford (loan)	3	(0)
2015–2018	Derby County	81	(9)
2017	→ Wolverhampton Wanderers (loan)	19	(2)
2018–2024	Bristol City	205	(50)
2024	→ West Bromwich Albion (loan)	12	(2)
2024–2025	Blackburn Rovers	30	(7)
2025–2026	Derby County	25	(1)
2026	→ Rapid Wien (loan)	15	(1)
2026–	Cheltenham Town	15	(4)

International career
2006–2008	Austria U17	6	(5)
2007–2009	Austria U19	8	(3)
2011	Austria U20	3	(0)
2009–2012	Austria U21	10	(6)
2012–2024	Austria	26	(2)
- * Club domestic league appearances and goals as of 20:32, 15 November 2026 (UTC)

Andreas Weimann (German pronunciation: [vaɪ̯man]; born 5 August 1991) is an Austrian professional footballer who plays as a forward or attacking midfielder for EFL League Two club Cheltenham Town.

Weimann was signed by Aston Villa as a sixteen-year-old from Rapid Wien and went on to make 129 total appearances and score 24 goals for the Premier League club. He left in 2015 for Derby County, joined Wolverhampton Wanderers on loan in January 2017, and signed for Bristol City in July 2018, Weimann spent six years at Bristol City, where he also had a loan spell at West Bromwich Albion in early 2024. In August 2024, he joined Blackburn Rovers where he spent a season, before returning to Derby County.

Weimann made his senior debut for the Austria national team in 2012, going on to earn 26 caps. He was also included in the squad for UEFA Euro 2024.

== Club career ==
=== Rapid Wien ===
Born in Vienna, Weimann began his career at hometown club Stadlau before joining Rapid Wien as a thirteen-year-old. He remained there for three years, before being signed by Premier League club Aston Villa, joining the club alongside fellow Austrian Dominik Hofbauer. He has since mentioned that he still supports Rapid.

=== Aston Villa ===
==== Early career ====
Weimann represented the club during the 2009 Peace Cup against Juventus, Atlante and Porto. He was an important figure in Aston Villa's Reserves, particularly in the 2009–10 season filling the void left by Nathan Delfouneso where he finished the season as the Reserve South League's top scorer with nine goals. Weimann then signed a contract extension which tied him to the club until June 2012.

On 8 May 2010, Weimann was named in the provisional squad for the final match of the season against Blackburn Rovers after impressing manager Martin O'Neill during the Reserve Play-off Final against Manchester United. However, he was not among the final 18 players selected. Days later, he was part of the Aston Villa team that won the Hong Kong Soccer Sevens tournament. He scored a hat-trick against the Yau Yee League Select of Hong Kong.

Weimann made his competitive debut for Aston Villa on 14 August 2010, replacing Ashley Young as a substitute in the 86th minute against West Ham United in a 3–0 home win on the first day of the Premier League season. Villa caretaker manager Kevin MacDonald named Weimann in his 20-man squad to travel to Austria to face former club Rapid Wien in the UEFA Europa League on 19 August; He came on as a substitute for Marc Albrighton after 79 minutes, only to be injured three minutes later. He was out of action until January 2011, when he returned to full training; in his first reserve game back, he scored twice in a 10–1 win over Arsenal.

==== Watford loans ====
On 19 January 2011, Weimann signed for Football League Championship club Watford on a loan deal for the remainder of the 2010–11 season. He made his debut ten days later in the fourth round of the FA Cup at home to League One leaders Brighton and Hove Albion; he replaced Will Buckley for the final ten minutes of the 1–0 loss. He then made his league debut against Crystal Palace at home on 1 February, scoring in the tenth minute of the 1–1 draw at Vicarage Road. He continued to feature for Aston Villa's reserve team during his loan spell, as the move was arranged as a youth loan agreement. He played 19 times in total for Watford, scoring 4 goals.

Weimann returned to Aston Villa and made his first appearance of the 2011–12 season on 23 August 2011 in the second round of the League Cup in a home tie against Hereford United. He came on as a second-half substitute for Darren Bent as Villa progressed to the next stage of the competition, courtesy of a 2–0 win. Three days later on 26 August, he signed a new contract to keep him at Villa Park until 2014. But just hours after renewing his Aston Villa contract, Weimann returned to Watford in a second loan deal until January 2012. He made three Championship appearances against Birmingham City, Reading and Barnsley, while on 23 September, he was recalled early due to injury concerns.

==== Return to Aston Villa ====
Following his return to the club, Weimann went straight in to the squad for the away game at Queens Park Rangers. On 10 March 2012, having come on as a substitute for Charles N'Zogbia, Weimann scored his first goal for Villa in the 92nd minute, giving the team a 1–0 victory over Fulham at Villa Park. The goal stemmed from Gary Gardner's shot, which was fumbled by Fulham goalkeeper Mark Schwarzer.

On 10 November 2012, Weimann scored two goals in a 3–2 home loss to Manchester United at Villa Park, and received a standing ovation when he was substituted. On 11 December, he scored twice as Villa beat Norwich City 4–1, which saw them through to the semi-final of the League Cup. Four days later, he scored Villa's second goal away at Liverpool after a combination with Christian Benteke, in a 3–1 win. After scoring in the first leg Weimann, who came on as a substitute, grabbed a goal against Bradford City in the League Cup semi-final second-leg. However the 89th-minute goal was too late for Villa, as they were eliminated after losing 4–3 on aggregate. Weimann ended the season with 12 goals in 38 games in all competitions.

Weimann opened his scoring for the 2013–14 season on 28 August 2013 with a 25-yard (23 m) shot against Rotherham United in a 3–0 win in the League Cup. His second, a month later, was the decider in a 3–2 home defeat of Manchester City. On 3 May 2014, Weimann scored two goals against Hull City in a game which ended in a 3–1 victory and secured Premier League survival. Weimann started the first game of the 2014–15 season for Villa against Stoke City, in which he scored the only goal in the 50th minute. Weimann scored in an FA Cup 4th round tie against Bournemouth, the second goal in a 2–1 victory at Villa Park. He started less frequently in this final season, under the management of Tim Sherwood.

=== Derby County ===
On 18 June 2015, Weimann joined Derby County on a four-year deal for an undisclosed fee estimated by the Derby Evening Telegraph to be £2 million. He scored his first goal for the Rams in the 7th minute in a 3–0 victory over Rotherham United on 31 October.

After having started only one league match during the 2016–17 season, Weimann joined Wolverhampton Wanderers on loan for the rest of the season on 19 January 2017. He made his debut for the club two days later coming on as a substitute in a 3–1 defeat to Norwich. On 28 January, he made his first start and scored his first goal for the club in a 2–1 FA Cup win against Liverpool at Anfield.

=== Bristol City ===
On 3 July 2018, Weimann signed for Championship club Bristol City on a three-year contract, with an option for a further year, for an undisclosed fee. On 30 March 2019, he scored his first career hat-trick as the Robins beat Sheffield United 3–2 at Bramall Lane, taking his goal tally up to 9 in the process, his highest amount in any season. His hat-trick was the first a Bristol City player had scored away from home in the top two tiers of English football since Kevin Mabbutt in 1978.

On 24 October 2020, Weimann suffered an anterior cruciate ligament injury against Swansea City, being ruled out for up to nine months. He scored 22 league goals in the 2021–22 season to reach a career-best goal tally for a season. On 15 January 2024, Weimann joined fellow Championship club West Bromwich Albion on loan until the end of the season. On 3 February 2024, he scored his first goal for West Brom, a 85-minute late winner in his second appearance and home debut for the club in a 1–0 home win against local rivals Birmingham City. Weimann was released from Bristol City following the expiration of his contract at the end of the 2023–24 season.

=== Blackburn Rovers ===
On 1 August 2024, Weimann joined Blackburn Rovers on a one-year deal. He scored his first goal for the club on his debut in a 4–2 win over former club Derby County on 9 August.

On 19 May 2025, Blackburn announced they had offered Weimann a new contract, but he would later leave the club.

=== Return to Derby County ===
On 1 July 2025, Weimann returned to Championship side Derby County on a one-year deal. On 9 August, Weimann made his debut in his second spell for Derby in a 3–1 league defeat at Stoke City as 80th-minute substitute for Corey Blackett-Taylor. On 13 September, Weimann scored his first goal for Derby in seven-and-half years in a 1–0 at West Bromwich Albion. On 18 October, Weimann made his 100th appearance for Derby in a 1–0 loss at Oxford United. Weimann played 27 times for Derby during the 2025–26 season, with his goal against West Brom being his only of the campaign, where he was mainly utilised as a substitute.

==== Return to Rapid Wien (loan) ====
On 5 February 2026, Weimann returned to Austrian Bundesliga side Rapid Wien on a season-long loan. On 7 February, he made his debut for Rapid in a 1–1 draw against Hartberg. Weimann played 17 times for Wien during his loan spell, scoring once as he played an important role in helping the team qualify for the 2026–27 UEFA Conference League via the play-offs.

On 15 May 2026, Derby announced that Weimann would leave at the end of the season when his contract would expire in June, ending his second stint with the club.

=== Cheltenham Town ===
On 14 August 2026, Weimann joined EFL League Two side Cheltenham Town.

== International career ==
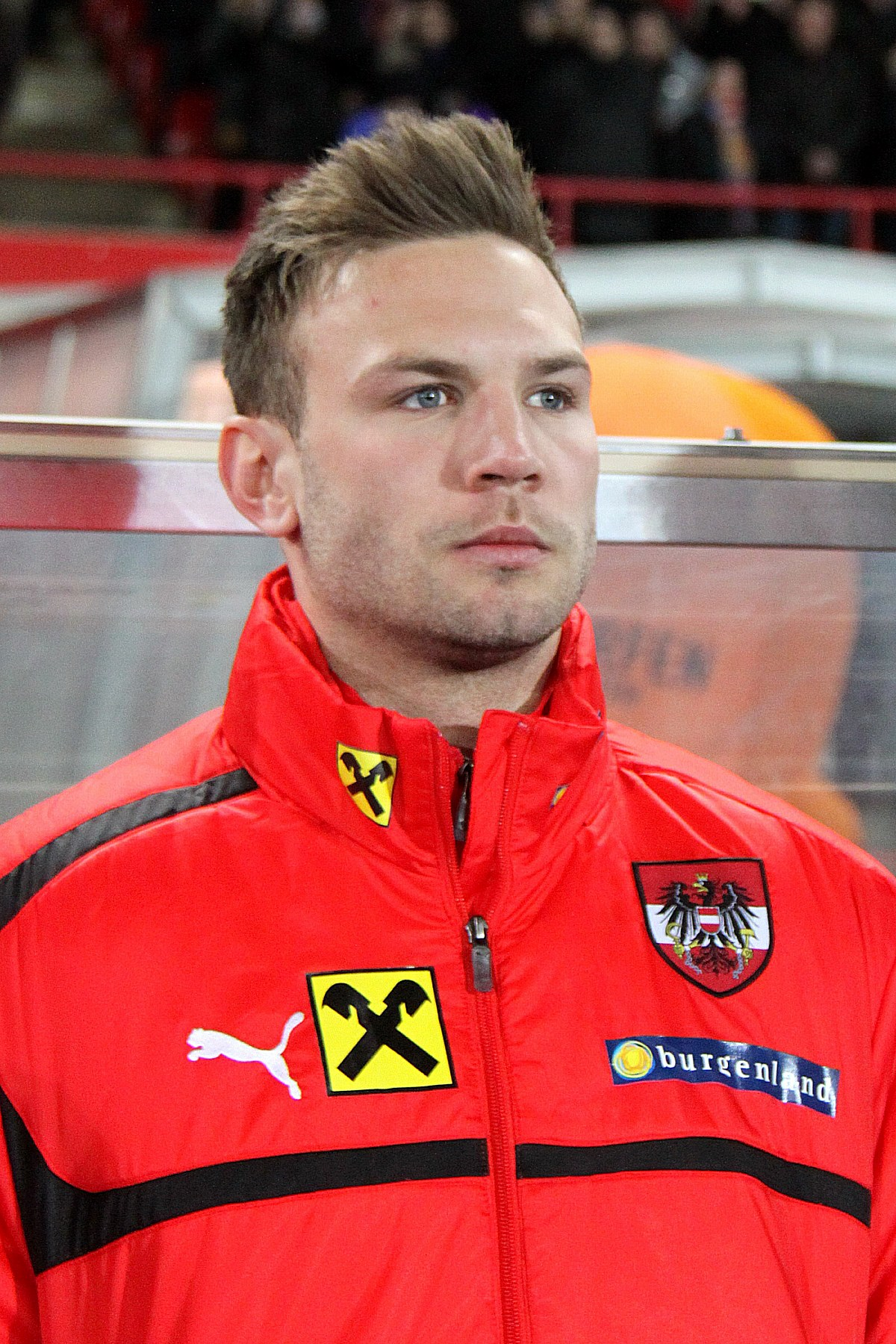
Weimann with Austria in 2013

Weimann represented Austria at under-17, under-19 and under-21 levels. He scored on his under-21 debut against Scotland Under-21 in a 2011 UEFA European Under-21 Championship qualification match on 5 September 2009. He scored in the 57th minute, just two minutes after replacing team-mate Marc Sand as a substitute. His other two goals in the qualifying process came against Azerbaijan and Albania.

In July 2010, Weimann was called up to the Austria U-19 squad for the 2010 UEFA European Under-19 Championship. Weimann featured in all three of Austria's games and came up against his Aston Villa team-mate Nathan Delfouneso in a 3–2 loss against England.

On 12 October 2012, Weimann made his debut for the Austria senior team against Kazakhstan in a 0–0 away draw. He came on in the 84th minute for Martin Harnik in the 2014 FIFA World Cup qualifier.

In March 2022, Weimann was recalled to the Austria senior team for their 2022 FIFA World Cup play-off match against Wales, his first call-up in seven years. On 10 June that year, he scored his first international goal against France, which gave Austria the lead in a UEFA Nations League game that ended 1–1.

== Career statistics ==
=== Club ===
As of match played 14 November 2026

Appearances and goals by club, season and competition
Club	Season	League			FA Cup		League Cup		Other		Total	
Club	Season	Division	Apps	Goals	Apps	Goals	Apps	Goals	Apps	Goals	Apps	Goals
Aston Villa	2010–11	Premier League	1	0	0	0	0	0	1 (Note: Appearance in UEFA Europa League)	0	2	0
Aston Villa	2011–12	Premier League	14	2	0	0	1	0	—		15	2
Aston Villa	2012–13	Premier League	30	7	2	1	6	4	—		38	12
Aston Villa	2013–14	Premier League	37	5	1	0	1	1	—		39	6
Aston Villa	2014–15	Premier League	31	3	3	1	1	0	—		35	4
Aston Villa	Total		113	17	6	2	9	5	1	0	129	24
Watford (loan)	2010–11	Championship	18	4	1	0	—		—		19	4
Watford (loan)	2011–12	Championship	3	0	—		—		—		3	0
Watford (loan)	Total		21	4	1	0	—		—		22	4
Derby County	2015–16	Championship	30	4	1	0	1	0	1 (Note: Appearance(s) in Championship play-offs)	0	33	4
Derby County	2016–17	Championship	11	0	0	0	1	0	—		12	0
Derby County	2017–18	Championship	40	5	1	0	0	0	2	0	43	5
Derby County	Total		81	9	2	0	2	0	3	0	88	9
Derby County U23	2016–17	Championship	—		—		—		2 (Note: Appearances in EFL Trophy)	2	2	2
Wolverhampton Wanderers (loan)	2016–17	Championship	19	2	2	1	—		—		21	3
Bristol City	2018–19	Championship	44	10	1	0	1	0	—		46	10
Bristol City	2019–20	Championship	45	9	2	0	0	0	—		47	9
Bristol City	2020–21	Championship	7	2	0	0	1	0	—		8	2
Bristol City	2021–22	Championship	46	22	1	0	0	0	—		47	22
Bristol City	2022–23	Championship	43	6	2	0	2	1	—		47	7
Bristol City	2023–24	Championship	20	1	1	0	0	0	—		21	1
Bristol City	Total		205	50	7	0	4	1	—		216	51
West Bromwich Albion (loan)	2023–24	Championship	12	2	—		—		1	0	13	2
Blackburn Rovers	2024–25	Championship	30	7	2	1	2	1	—		34	9
Derby County	2025–26	Championship	25	1	0	0	2	0	—		27	1
Rapid Wien (loan)	2025–26	Austrian Bundesliga	15	1	—		—		2 (Note: Appearances in Conference League play-offs)	0	17	1
Cheltenham Town	2026–27	League Two	15	4	1	0	—		1	0	17	4
Career total			536	97	21	4	19	7	10	2	586	110

=== International ===
Appearances and goals by national team and year
National team	Year	Apps	Goals
Austria	2012	2	0
Austria	2013	8	0
Austria	2014	3	0
Austria	2015	1	0
Austria	2022	7	1
Austria	2024	5	1
Total		26	2

Scores and results list Austria's goal tally first, score column indicates score after each Weimann goal.

List of international goals scored by Andreas Weimann
No.	Date	Venue	Opponent	Score	Result	Competition
1	10 June 2022	Ernst-Happel-Stadion, Vienna, Austria	France	1–0	1–1	2022–23 UEFA Nations League A
2	23 March 2024	Tehelné pole, Bratislava, Slovakia	Slovakia	2–0	2–0	Friendly

== Honours ==
Individual

- Bristol City Player of the Year: 2021–22
