= Dylan Kadji =

English football player

- Kadji with Wealdstone in 2026

Personal information
- Full name: Dylan Wesley Nkongape Kadji
- Date of birth: 1 September 2003 (age 23)
- Place of birth: Bedford, England
- Position: Midfielder

Team information
- Current team: Wealdstone
- Number: 8

Youth career
- –2022: Bristol City

Senior career*
Years	Team	Apps	(Gls)
2022–2024	Bristol City	2	(0)
2021–2022	→ Bath City (loan)	6	(0)
2023	→ Swindon Town (loan)	13	(0)
2023–2024	→ Forest Green Rovers (loan)	6	(0)
2024	→ Aldershot Town (loan)	6	(0)
2024–2025	Weston-super-Mare	43	(3)
2025–	Wealdstone	51	(3)
- * Club domestic league appearances and goals as of 21:36, 10 November 2026 (UTC)

Dylan Wesley Nkongape Kadji (born 1 September 2003) is an English footballer who plays as a midfielder for National League club Wealdstone.

== Career ==
=== Bristol City ===
Kadji came through the youth academy at Bristol City and signed a professional contract in November 2021.

==== 2021: Loan to Bath City ====
Kadji played 6 matches on loan for Bath City in the 2021–22 season, making his debut on 26 December 2021 against Chippenham Town. Kadji started the move that led to the fourth goal in a 4–1 win for his new club. His home debut for Bath at Twerton Park came a week later in a 2–0 win on 2 January 2022 again against Chippenham Town.

==== 2022: Senior debut ====
Although he was still training with the Bristol City first team even whilst on loan with Bath, Kadji particularly impressed manager Nigel Pearson and was singled out for praise after training with the first team squad in pre-season camp during the summer of 2022.

Pearson was quick to downplay too much pressure being put on the young player's development as Kadji had suffered from injuries that meant he had to sit out sections of their summer tour of Austria. On 24 August, 2022 Kadji opened the scoring 7 minutes into his Bristol City senior debut, against Wycombe Wanderers at Adams Park in an EFL Cup second round match, which finished in a 3–1 victory for his side.

==== Further loans ====
On 31 January 2023, Kadji joined Swindon Town on a six-month loan deal. He made his first league start for Swindon on 4 February 2023 against Newport County, a 2–1 defeat that also marked the first league match in charge of Swindon for new manager Jody Morris.

On 4 August 2023, Kadji joined Forest Green Rovers on a season-long loan.

On 4 March 2024, Kadji joined Aldershot Town on loan until the end of the season.

He was released by Bristol City at the end of the 2023-24 season.

=== Non-League ===
In July 2024, Kadji joined National League South side Weston-super-Mare.

On 11 July 2025, Kadji signed for National League club Wealdstone on a two-year deal. He was a member of the side that reached the 2026 FA Trophy final, starting in the defeat against Southend United at Wembley Stadium.

== Style of play ==
Bristol City manager Nigel Pearson said after his debut that Kadji had "really good attributes for the modern game. He's a good mover, he's got decent vision and ability."

== Personal life ==
Born in England, Kadji is of Cameroonian descent.

== Career statistics ==
As of 10 November 2026

Appearances and goals by club, season and competition
Club	Season	League			FA Cup		EFL Cup		Other		Total	
Club	Season	Division	Apps	Goals	Apps	Goals	Apps	Goals	Apps	Goals	Apps	Goals
Bristol City	2021–22	Championship	0	0	0	0	0	0	—		0	0
Bristol City	2022–23	Championship	2	0	0	0	2	1	—		4	1
Bristol City	2023–24	Championship	0	0	0	0	0	0	—		0	0
Bristol City	Total		2	0	0	0	2	1	—		4	1
Bath City (loan)	2021–22	National League South	6	0	0	0	—		0	0	6	0
Swindon Town (loan)	2022–23	League Two	13	0	—		—		—		13	0
Forest Green Rovers (loan)	2023–24	League Two	6	0	0	0	1	0	1 (Note: Appearances in EFL Trophy)	1	8	1
Aldershot Town (loan)	2023–24	National League	6	0	0	0	—		0	0	6	0
Weston-super-Mare	2024–25	National League South	43	3	5	0	—		2 (Note: Appearances in Somerset Premier Cup)	0	50	3
Wealdstone	2025–26	National League	37	2	3	0	—		8 (Note: Appearances in National League Cup and FA Trophy)	0	48	2
Wealdstone	2026–27	National League	14	1	1	0	—		4 (Note: Appearances in National League Cup)	0	19	1
Wealdstone	Total		51	3	4	0	—		12	0	67	3
Career total			127	6	9	0	3	1	15	1	154	8

== Honours ==
Wealdstone

- FA Trophy runner-up: 2025–26
