= Sam Pearson (footballer) =

Welsh association football player

Personal information
- Full name: Samuel Pearson
- Date of birth: 26 October 2001 (age 25)
- Place of birth: Cardiff, Wales
- Height: 1.81 m (5 ft 11 in)
- Position: Forward

Team information
- Current team: Eastleigh
- Number: 20

Youth career
- 2016–2019: Bristol City

Senior career*
Years	Team	Apps	(Gls)
2019–2024	Bristol City	5	(0)
2019–2020	→ Bath City (loan)	17	(2)
2020	→ Weymouth (loan)	0	(0)
2022	→ Inverness Caledonian Thistle (loan)	8	(1)
2022–2023	→ Yeovil Town (loan)	13	(2)
2023	→ AFC Wimbledon (loan)	16	(0)
2024	Yeovil Town	28	(5)
2024–2025	Weston-super-Mare	47	(16)
2025–	Eastleigh	14	(2)
2026	→ Dorking Wanderers (loan)	9	(2)

International career^{‡}
2017	Wales U17	1	(0)
2019	Wales U19	10	(1)
2020	Wales U20	1	(0)
2020–2022	Wales U21	13	(1)
- * Club domestic league appearances and goals as of 19:37, 27 April 2026 (UTC) ‡ National team caps and goals as of 10:58, 4 June 2022 (UTC)

Samuel Pearson (born 26 October 2001) is a Welsh professional footballer who plays as a forward for National League club Eastleigh. He is a former Wales youth international, playing at U17 to U21 level, and began his career at Bristol City.

== Career ==
On 6 March 2021, Pearson made his debut for Bristol City in the Championship as a substitute in a 2–0 defeat against Queens Park Rangers.

On 21 January 2022, Pearson joined Scottish Championship side Inverness Caledonian Thistle on loan for the remainder of the 2021–22 season. He left the club on 1 April 2022 due to a family bereavement and returned to his parent club.

On 28 July 2022, Pearson joined National League side Yeovil Town on an initial one-month loan deal. On 24 August, the loan spell was extended until January 2023. In January 2023, Pearson joined League Two club AFC Wimbledon on loan until the end of the season.

In January 2024, Pearson left Bristol City following the mutual termination of his contract. On 18 January 2024, he returned to now National League South club Yeovil Town, signing a permanent deal with the club. On 20 January 2024, Pearson scored on his returning debut for the Glovers against Hemel Hempstead Town. At the end of the 2023–24 season, Pearson signed a new one-year contract at Yeovil Town to extend his stay at the club. On 16 October 2024, Pearson left Yeovil Town following the mutual termination of his contract due to personal reasons.

Following his departure from Yeovil Town, Pearson signed for National League South side Weston-super-Mare.

In November 2025, Pearson signed for National League side Eastleigh on a permanent deal for an undisclosed fee. On 13 March 2026, Pearson returned to the National League South to join, Dorking Wanderers on loan for the remainder of the season.

== Career statistics ==
As of match played 18 April 2026

Appearances and goals by club, season and competition
Club	Season	League			National Cup		League Cup		Other		Total	
Club	Season	Division	Apps	Goals	Apps	Goals	Apps	Goals	Apps	Goals	Apps	Goals
Bristol City	2019–20	Championship	0	0	0	0	0	0	—		0	0
Bristol City	2020–21	Championship	5	0	0	0	0	0	—		5	0
Bristol City	2021–22	Championship	0	0	0	0	0	0	—		0	0
Bristol City	2022–23	Championship	0	0	0	0	0	0	—		0	0
Bristol City	2023–24	Championship	0	0	0	0	0	0	—		0	0
Bristol City	Total		5	0	0	0	0	0	—		5	0
Bath City (loan)	2019–20	National League South	17	2	1	0	—		4 (Note: Three appearances in FA Trophy, one in National League South play-offs)	0	22	2
Weymouth (loan)	2020–21	National League	0	0	0	0	—		0	0	0	0
Inverness Caledonian Thistle (loan)	2021–22	Scottish Championship	8	1	0	0	—		0	0	8	1
Yeovil Town (loan)	2022–23	National League	11	2	2	0	—		0	0	13	2
AFC Wimbledon (loan)	2022–23	League Two	16	0	—		—		—		16	0
Yeovil Town	2023–24	National League South	16	4	—		—		—		16	4
Yeovil Town	2024–25	National League	12	1	1	0	—		0	0	13	1
Yeovil Town	Total		28	5	1	0	—		0	0	29	5
Weston-super-Mare	2024–25	National League South	34	11	—		—		2 (Note: One appearance in FA Trophy, one appearance in Somerset Premier Cup)	0	36	11
Weston-super-Mare	2025–26	National League South	13	5	5	1	—		0	0	18	6
Weston-super-Mare	Total		47	16	5	1	—		0	0	54	17
Eastleigh	2025–26	National League	14	2	—		—		2 (Note: One appearance in FA Trophy, one appearance in Hampshire Senior Cup)	0	16	2
Dorking Wanderers (loan)	2025–26	National League South	9	2	—		—		0	0	9	2
Career total			155	30	9	1	0	0	8	0	172	31
