= Alex Scott (footballer, born 2003) =

England international footballer (born 2003)

- Scott with Bournemouth in 2026

Personal information
- Full name: Alex Jay Scott
- Date of birth: 21 August 2003 (age 23)
- Place of birth: Guernsey, Channel Islands
- Height: 5 ft 10 in (1.78 m)
- Position: Midfielder

Team information
- Current team: Bournemouth
- Number: 8

Youth career
- Southampton
- Bournemouth

Senior career*
Years	Team	Apps	(Gls)
2019–2020	Guernsey	14	(0)
2020–2023	Bristol City	83	(5)
2023–	Bournemouth	85	(5)

International career^{‡}
2021	England U18	1	(0)
2021–2022	England U19	12	(1)
2022–2023	England U20	9	(0)
2024–2025	England U21	11	(1)
2026–	England	2	(0)
Medal record
Men's football
Representing England
UEFA European Under-19 Championship
Winner	2022 Slovakia
UEFA European Under-21 Championship
Winner	2025 Slovakia
- * Club domestic league appearances and goals as of 21:58, 29 September 2026 (UTC) ‡ National team caps and goals as of 17:58, 3 October 2026 (UTC)

Alex Jay Scott (born 21 August 2003) is a professional footballer who plays as a midfielder for Premier League club Bournemouth and the England national team.

Scott began his career at Guernsey, before joining Bristol City in January 2020. While at Bristol City, he won the 2022–23 EFL Championship Young Player of the Season award and was named in the EFL Championship Team of the Season. In August 2023, he signed for Bournemouth for a transfer fee of around £25 million.

== Club career ==
=== Early career ===
After playing with the youth teams of Southampton and Bournemouth, Scott signed for Isthmian League side Guernsey at the age of 16. He made his debut for the Green Lions against Phoenix Sports on 31 August 2019 becoming the youngest ever Guernsey player. Scott made 15 appearances for Guernsey before his transfer in January 2020. During his time with Guernsey, Scott questioned whether he could make it as a professional player.

=== Bristol City ===
In December 2019, Scott signed a pre-contract agreement with Championship side Bristol City. Having initially linked up with the club's academy, Scott signed his first professional contract with Bristol City in March 2021. Scott made his professional debut with Bristol City as a starter in a 1–1 Championship draw to Blackpool on 7 August 2021. After missing a crucial chance earlier on in the game against Nottingham Forest, Scott soon went on to get his first career goal for the Robins, putting them 1–0 up on 19 October 2021 at the 39th minute mark, coming off in the 78th minute in a game that ended 2–1 to Nottingham Forest.

Scott's impressive performances across the 2022–23 season did not go unnoticed with manager Nigel Pearson valuing him at over £25 million amid interest from a number of Premier League clubs. He was awarded the EFL Young Player of the Month award for February 2023 having played a starring role in Bristol City's midfield as they climbed the table. Following Bristol City's defeat against Manchester City in the FA Cup on 28 February 2023, Scott was described by Pep Guardiola as an "unbelievable player", and by Jack Grealish as a "top, top talent". Scott was named EFL Championship Young Player of the Season, and included in the EFL Championship Team of the Season, and was also named Bristol City's Player of the Year and Young Player of the Year.

=== Bournemouth ===
On 10 August 2023, Scott completed a permanent transfer to Bournemouth, one of his old clubs at youth level, on a long-term deal. Bristol City received a club-record fee, believed to be around £25 million. He joined Bournemouth despite having sustained a "significant" knee injury prior to leaving Bristol City, which meant Scott did not feature for Bournemouth in the opening months of the 2023–24 season.

Scott made his debut for the Cherries on 21 October 2023, playing 56 minutes in a 2–1 defeat to Wolverhampton Wanderers. Scott then suffered an MCL injury four games later versus Manchester City which kept him on the sidelines for another seven weeks. It was the end of April 2024 before he started successive Premier League games, with Bournemouth eventually finishing 12th in their first season under Andoni Iraola.

In the 2024–25 Premier League season, Scott did not complete a full 90 minutes for Bournemouth, often being utilised as a substitute. He suffered a meniscus tear in October, requiring surgery, which kept him out for four months. On return to full fitness for the 2025–26 season, Scott regained his place in the starting eleven, featuring in each of the opening games. He scored his first goal of the season on 13 September against Brighton & Hove Albion, in a 2–1 victory.

== International career ==
Scott made 33 appearances in total for England's youth national teams, at under-18, under-19, under-20 and under-21 levels.

He received his first call-up to the England under-18 team in March 2021. On 29 March 2021, Scott made his debut as a second-half substitute in England's 2–0 win against Wales.

On 2 September 2021, Scott made his debut for the England under-19 team during a 2–0 victory over Italy at St. George's Park. On 17 June 2022, he was included in the England under-19 squad for the 2022 UEFA European Under-19 Championship. He came off the bench during the semi-final against Italy to score an equaliser with his first touch of the game. Scott started in the final as England won the tournament with a 3–1 extra time victory over Israel on 1 July 2022.

On 21 September 2022, Scott made his England under-20 debut during a 3–0 victory over Chile at the Pinatar Arena. On 10 May 2023, he was included in the England under-20 squad for the 2023 FIFA U-20 World Cup and started in three of their four games at the tournament including the round of sixteen defeat against Italy.

On 22 March 2024, Scott made his England under-21 debut, coming on as a second-half substitute in a 5–1 away win against Azerbaijan. On 6 June 2025, he was included in the England under-21 squad for the 2025 UEFA European Under-21 Championship and started in five of their six games at the tournament. Scott would start in the final as England won the tournament with a 3–2 win over Germany on 28 June 2025.

On 7 November 2025, Scott was called up to the senior England squad for the first time by manager Thomas Tuchel for the squads to play Serbia and Albania, but he did not make an appearance.

On 23 May 2026, it was announced Scott was one of five players (alongside Jason Steele, Ethan Nwaneri, Josh King and Rio Ngumoha) that would join the senior team for the squad's preparation camp before the 2026 FIFA World Cup.

He made his senior international debut on 29 September 2026 as a 70th-minute substitute in a 2–0 UEFA Nations League win over Czech Republic at Fortuna Arena.

== Personal life ==
Scott is the step-brother of England women's international defender Maya Le Tissier. They both trained and played together in Saint Martin, Guernsey, when they were teenagers and remain close friends. Scott was named 2024 Channel Islands Sports Personality of the Year.

== Career statistics ==
As of match played 20 September 2026

Appearances and goals by club, season and competition
Club	Season	League			FA Cup		EFL Cup		Europe		Other		Total	
Club	Season	Division	Apps	Goals	Apps	Goals	Apps	Goals	Apps	Goals	Apps	Goals	Apps	Goals
Guernsey	2019–20	Isthmian League; South East Division	14	0	—		—		—		1 (Note: Appearance in FA Trophy)	0	15	0
Bristol City	2019–20	Championship	0	0	0	0	—		—		—		0	0
Bristol City	2020–21	Championship	3	0	0	0	0	0	—		—		3	0
Bristol City	2021–22	Championship	38	4	1	0	0	0	—		—		39	4
Bristol City	2022–23	Championship	42	1	4	1	3	0	—		—		49	2
Bristol City	Total		83	5	5	1	3	0	—		—		91	6
Bournemouth	2023–24	Premier League	23	1	3	1	1	0	—		—		27	2
Bournemouth	2024–25	Premier League	20	0	2	0	1	0	—		—		23	0
Bournemouth	2025–26	Premier League	37	3	1	1	1	0	—		—		39	4
Bournemouth	2026–27	Premier League	5	1	0	0	0	0	1 (Note: Appearances in UEFA Europa League)	0	—		6	1
Bournemouth	Total		85	5	6	2	3	0	1	0	—		95	7
Career total			182	10	11	3	6	0	1	0	1	0	201	13

=== International ===
As of match played 3 October 2026

Appearances and goals by national team and year
National team	Year	Apps	Goals
England	2026	2	0
Total		2	0

== Honours ==
England U19

- UEFA European Under-19 Championship: 2022

England U21

- UEFA European Under-21 Championship: 2025

Individual

- EFL Championship Young Player of the Season: 2022–23
- EFL Championship Team of the Season: 2022–23
- EFL Young Player of the Month: February 2023
- Rising Star Award CI Sports Awards: 2022
- Bristol City Player of the Year: 2022–23
