= Ryley Towler =

English footballer (born 2002)

Personal information
- Full name: Ryley Ben Towler
- Date of birth: 6 May 2002 (age 24)
- Place of birth: Bristol, England
- Height: 1.86 m (6 ft 1 in)
- Position: Centre back

Team information
- Current team: Lincoln City
- Number: 6

Youth career
- 2011–2019: Bristol City

Senior career*
Years	Team	Apps	(Gls)
2019–2023	Bristol City	4	(0)
2019	→ Frome Town (loan)	2	(0)
2020	→ Taunton Town (loan)	5	(0)
2021	→ Grimsby Town (loan)	13	(0)
2022–2023	→ AFC Wimbledon (loan)	17	(1)
2023–2025	Portsmouth	38	(3)
2025–	Lincoln City	51	(1)
- * Club domestic league appearances and goals as of 16:11, 24 October 2026 (UTC)

Ryley Ben Towler (born 6 May 2002) is an English professional footballer who plays as a centre back for EFL Championship club Lincoln City.

== Career ==
=== Bristol City ===
Towler joined his local City academy in the under 9 age group. A left footed player who went to Mangotsfield School, Towler is considered an option at left back or left centre back.

On 10 February 2021, Towler made his debut for Bristol City in the FA Cup fifth round starting away at Bramall Lane against Sheffield United.

On 9 September 2021, Towler joined Grimsby Town on loan until January 2022. Towler made his debut for the 'Mariners' on 11 September 2021, in a 3–1 away win against Torquay United. He went on to play 13 games in the National League for Grimsby Town, and one appearance in the FA Cup in a 1–0 defeat to Kidderminster Harriers. Towler was recalled on 20 December 2021 and returned to Bristol City.

On 1 September 2022, Towler joined AFC Wimbledon on loan for the 2022–23 season. He scored his first goal for Wimbledon in a 3–1 loss to Walsall on 8 October 2022. Towler was recalled from his loan on 6 January 2023.

=== Portsmouth ===
On 6 January 2023, Towler signed for League One club Portsmouth for an undisclosed fee on a three-and-a-half-year deal. He made his Pompey debut as a substitute against Bolton Wanderers in January 2023, and made his full debut a week later in a 2–0 home win over Exeter City. Towler scored two second-half goals in a 3–1 win over Bolton on 28 February 2023. However, with the promotion of Portsmouth to the Championship, the club looked to loan him out in the 2024–25 winter transfer window.

=== Lincoln City ===
On 7 July 2025, Towler signed for EFL League One club, Lincoln City for an undisclosed fee, signing a deal until 2029. He made his debut, starting in the opening day 2–0 win against Reading at left-back. On 17 March 2026, he scored his first goal for the Imps scoring a stoppage time equaliser against Huddersfield Town, to help take their unbeaten run to 21 games. He signed a new four-year contract just a year into his initial deal, keeping him contracted until 2030.

== Career statistics ==
As of 24 October 2026

Appearances and goals by club, season and competition
Club	Season	League			FA Cup		EFL Cup		Other		Total	
Club	Season	Division	Apps	Goals	Apps	Goals	Apps	Goals	Apps	Goals	Apps	Goals
Bristol City	2019–20	Championship	0	0	0	0	0	0	—		0	0
Bristol City	2020–21	Championship	3	0	1	0	0	0	—		4	0
Bristol City	2021–22	Championship	1	0	0	0	0	0	—		1	0
Bristol City	2022–23	Championship	0	0	0	0	0	0	—		0	0
Total			4	0	1	0	0	0	—		5	0
Frome Town (loan)	2018-19	SL Division One South	2	0	0	0	—		0	0	2	0
Taunton Town (loan)	2019–20	SL Premier Division South	5	0	0	0	—		0	0	5	0
Grimsby Town (loan)	2021–22	National League	13	0	1	0	—		1 (Note: Appearance in FA Trophy)	0	15	0
AFC Wimbledon (loan)	2022–23	League Two	17	1	3	0	0	0	4 (Note: Appearances in EFL Trophy)	0	24	1
Portsmouth	2022–23	League One	20	2	—		—		—		20	2
Portsmouth	2023–24	League One	6	0	—		1	0	4	1	11	1
Portsmouth	2024–25	Championship	12	1	1	0	1	0	—		14	1
Portsmouth	Total		38	3	1	0	2	0	4	1	45	4
Lincoln City	2025–26	League One	40	1	1	0	3	0	4	0	48	1
Lincoln City	2026–27	Championship	11	0	0	0	3	0	—		14	0
Lincoln City	Total		51	1	1	0	6	0	4	0	62	1
Career total			130	5	7	0	8	0	13	1	158	6

== Honours ==
Portsmouth

- EFL League One: 2023–24

Lincoln City

- EFL League One: 2025–26
