= Zak Vyner =

English footballer (born 1997)

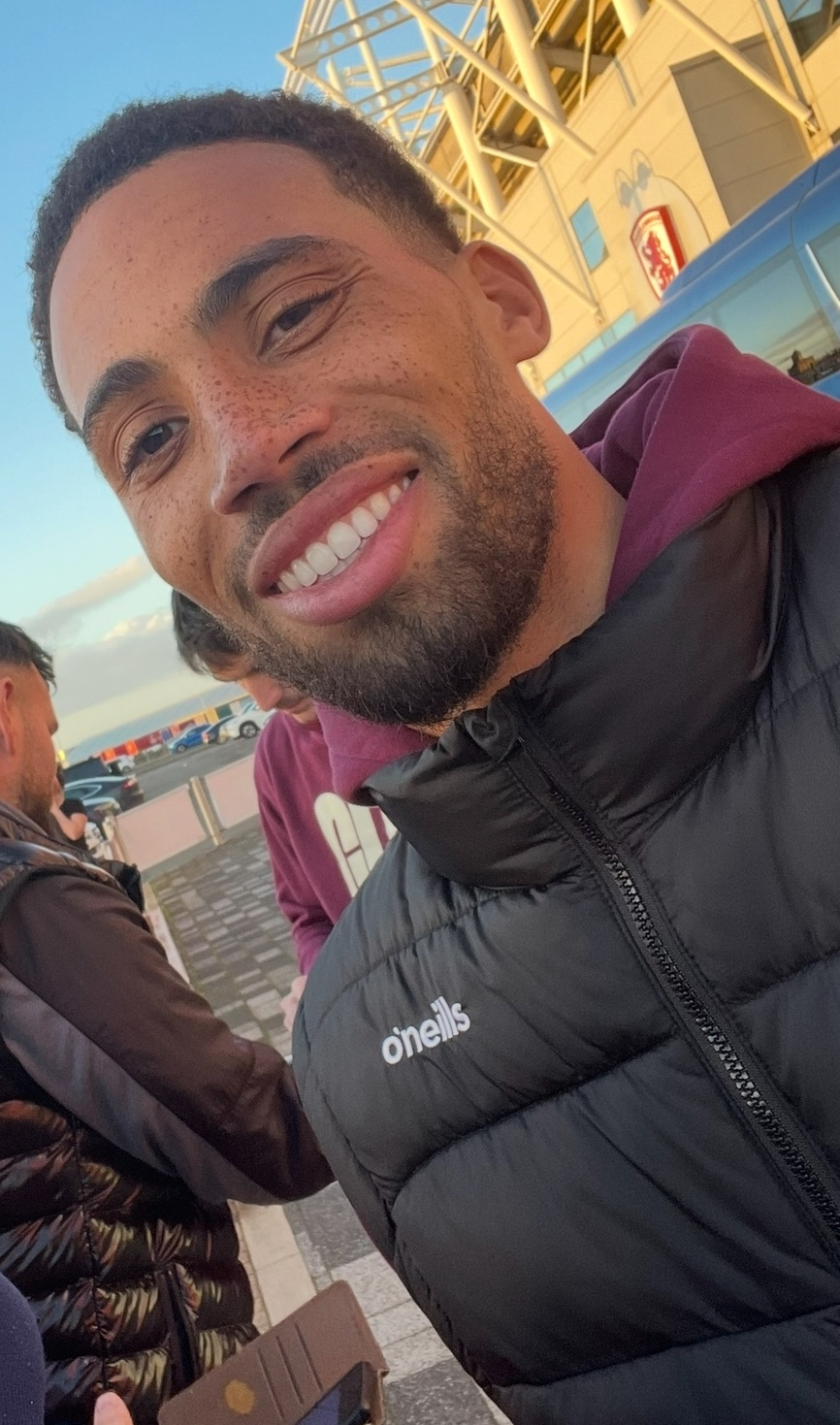
- Zak Vyner in 2024.

Personal information
- Full name: Zachary George Onyego Vyner
- Date of birth: 14 May 1997 (age 29)
- Place of birth: Southwark, England
- Height: 6 ft 2 in (1.87 m)
- Position: Defender

Team information
- Current team: Wrexham
- Number: 26

Youth career
- 2004–2015: Bristol City

Senior career*
Years	Team	Apps	(Gls)
2015–2026	Bristol City	236	(4)
2016–2017	→ Accrington Stanley (loan)	16	(0)
2018	→ Plymouth Argyle (loan)	17	(1)
2018–2019	→ Rotherham United (loan)	31	(0)
2019–2020	→ Aberdeen (loan)	16	(1)
2026–	Wrexham	8	(0)

International career^{‡}
2026–	Kenya	1	(0)
- * Club domestic league appearances and goals as of 18:44, 8 March 2026 (UTC) ‡ National team caps and goals as of 17 November 2026

Zachary George Onyego Vyner (born 14 May 1997) is a professional footballer who plays as a defender for EFL Championship club Wrexham. Born in England, he plays for the Kenya national team.

== Early life ==
Vyner attended Beechen Cliff School alongside fellow Bristol City academy graduate Max O'Leary.

== Career ==
=== Bristol City (2015–2026) ===
On 20 February 2016, Vyner made his Championship debut for Bristol City in a 2–0 victory against Milton Keynes Dons.

On 10 February 2018, Vyner scored his first senior goal for Plymouth Argyle in a 2–1 away victory against Shrewsbury Town.

On 2 July 2018, Vyner agreed a season-long loan with fellow Championship club Rotherham United.

Vyner moved to Scottish Premiership club Aberdeen on loan in August 2019.

He scored his first goal for Bristol City in a 2–0 win over Preston North End on 16 January 2021.

On 19 March 2023, Vyner was named captain for the first time in a 2–0 loss to Swansea City. Speaking to Bristol City, Vyner stated that 'It was a massive honour for me to lead the team out and it was a great feeling for myself'.

=== Wrexham (2026–) ===
On 1 February 2026, Vyner joined Wrexham for an undisclosed sum, signing a three-and-a-half year deal with the option to extend. Vyner's transfer fee was reported to be £1.5 million.

== International career ==
Vyner was born in England to an English father and Kenyan mother. On 31 May 2024 it was revealed Vyner had been called up to represent Kenya at international level. On 13 March 2025, he earned a recall to the set up.

Vyner made his international debut for Kenya on 17 November 2026 at the African Cup of Nations qualifier against South Africa at Nyayo National Stadium in Nairobi.

== Career statistics ==
As of match played 7 March 2026

Appearances and goals by club, season and competition
Club	Season	League			National cup (Note: Includes FA Cup)		League cup (Note: Includes EFL Cup, Scottish League Cup)		Other		Total	
Club	Season	Division	Apps	Goals	Apps	Goals	Apps	Goals	Apps	Goals	Apps	Goals
Bristol City	2015–16	Championship	4	0	0	0	0	0	—		4	0
Bristol City	2016–17	Championship	3	0	1	0	0	0	—		4	0
Bristol City	2017–18	Championship	1	0	1	0	3	0	—		5	0
Bristol City	2018–19	Championship	0	0	0	0	0	0	—		0	0
Bristol City	2019–20	Championship	8	0	0	0	0	0	—		8	0
Bristol City	2020–21	Championship	43	2	3	0	3	0	—		49	2
Bristol City	2021–22	Championship	22	0	0	0	0	0	—		22	0
Bristol City	2022–23	Championship	45	1	4	0	2	0	—		51	1
Bristol City	2023–24	Championship	36	0	4	0	1	0	—		41	0
Bristol City	2024–25	Championship	47	1	0	0	1	0	2 (Note: Appearances in EFL Championship play-offs)	0	50	1
Bristol City	2025–26	Championship	27	0	1	0	2	0	—		30	0
Bristol City	Total		236	4	14	0	11	0	2	0	264	4
Accrington Stanley (loan)	2016–17	League Two	16	0	0	0	1	0	0	0	17	0
Plymouth Argyle (loan)	2017–18	League One	17	1	0	0	0	0	0	0	17	1
Rotherham United (loan)	2018–19	Championship	31	0	1	0	2	0	—		34	0
Aberdeen (loan)	2019–20	Scottish Premiership	16	1	0	0	2	0	0	0	18	1
Wrexham	2025–26	Championship	3	0	1	0	—		—		4	0
Wrexham	2026–27	Championship	0	0	0	0	1	0	0	0	1	0
Wrexham	Total		3	0	1	0	1	0	0	0	5	0
Career total			319	6	16	0	17	0	2	0	354	6
