= 2022–23 Bristol City F.C. season =

Bristol City
2022–23 season
- Owner: Stephen Lansdown
- Manager: Nigel Pearson
- Stadium: Ashton Gate
- Championship: 14th
- FA Cup: Fifth round
- EFL Cup: Third round
- Top goalscorer: League: Nahki Wells (11); All: Tommy Conway (12)
- Highest home attendance: 24,543 vs Sunderland, 6 August 2022, Championship; 25,713 vs Manchester City, 28 February 2023, FA Cup
- Lowest home attendance: 7,961 vs Lincoln City, 8 November 2022, EFL Cup
Home colours	Away colours	Third colours

The 2022–23 season was the 125th season in the existence of Bristol City Football Club and the club's eighth consecutive season in the Championship. In addition to the league, they also competed in the 2022–23 FA Cup and the 2022–23 EFL Cup.

== Squad ==
As of 1 October 2022

Note: Flags indicate national team as has been defined under FIFA eligibility rules. Players may hold more than one non-FIFA nationality.

No.	Name	Nat.	Position(s)	Date of birth (age)	Apps.	Goals	Year signed	Signed from	Transfer fee	Ends
Goalkeepers
12	Max O'Leary	(Republic of Ireland)	GK	10 October 1996 (aged 25)	68	0	2015	Academy	Trainee	2023
13	Harvey Wiles-Richards	(England)	GK	27 May 2002 (aged 20)	0	0	2019	(England) Bath City	Free transfer	2023
23	Nikita Haikin	(Russia) (Israel)	GK	11 July 1995 (aged 27)	0	0	2023	Free Agent	Free transfer	2023
Defenders
2	Kane Wilson	(England)	RB/RM	11 March 2000 (aged 22)	7	1	2022	(England) Forest Green Rovers	Undisclosed	2025
3	Jay Dasilva	(England)	LB/LM	22 April 1998 (aged 24)	142	2	2019	(England) Chelsea	Undisclosed	2023
4	Kal Naismith	(Scotland)	LB/CB/RB	18 April 1992 (aged 30)	26	1	2022	(England) Luton Town	Free transfer	2025
5	Robert Atkinson	(England)	CB/LB	13 July 1998 (aged 24)	66	6	2021	(England) Oxford United	Undisclosed	2024
16	Cameron Pring	(England)	LB	22 January 1998 (aged 24)	66	1	2016	Academy	Trainee	2023
19	George Tanner	(England)	RB/CB	16 November 1999 (aged 22)	40	1	2021	(England) Carlisle United	Undisclosed	2024
22	Tomáš Kalas	(Czech Republic)	CB	15 May 1993 (aged 29)	152	1	2019	(England) Chelsea	£8,000,000	2023
24	Duncan Idehen	(England)	CB	4 July 2002 (aged 20)	2	0	2022	(England) Birmingham City	Free transfer	2023
26	Zak Vyner	(England)	CB/RB	14 May 1997 (aged 25)	138	2	2015	Academy	Trainee	2023
Midfielders
6	Matty James	(England)	CM/DM	22 July 1991 (aged 31)	68	1	2021	(England) Leicester City	Free	2024
7	Alex Scott	(England) (Guernsey)	CM	21 August 2003 (aged 18)	86	6	2021	Academy	Trainee	Undisclosed
8	Joe Williams	(England)	DM/CM	8 December 1996 (aged 25)	60	2	2020	(England) Wigan Athletic	£1,200,000	2024
10	Andy King	(Wales) (England)	CM/AM/DM	29 October 1988 (aged 33)	41	1	2021	(Belgium) OH Leuven	Free	2023
11	Anis Mehmeti	(Albania) (England)	AM/CM	9 January 2001 (aged 21)	13	1	2023	(England) Wycombe Wanderers	Undisclosed	2026
17	Mark Sykes	(Republic of Ireland) (Northern Ireland)	CM/RM/LM	4 August 1997 (aged 24)	38	5	2022	(England) Oxford United	Free	2025
18	Ayman Benarous	(England)	CM	27 July 2003 (aged 19)	12	0	2021	Academy	Trainee	2025
29	Josh Owers	(England)	CM	16 March 2002 (aged 20)	0	0	2022	Academy	Trainee	2024
35	Omar Taylor-Clarke	(Wales)	CM	30 June 2023 (aged 0)	9	0	2023	Academy	Trainee	2025
36	Marlee Francois	(Australia)	LW/RW/AM	29 December 2002 (aged 19)	2	0	2023	Academy	Trainee	2023
Forwards
9	Harry Cornick	(England)	CF/RW/LW	9 April 1995 (aged 27)	13	1	2023	(England) Luton Town	Undisclosed	2026
14	Andreas Weimann	(Austria)	SS/CF/RW/LW	5 August 1991 (aged 30)	190	48	2018	(England) Derby County	Undisclosed	2024
15	Tommy Conway	(Scotland)	CF	6 August 2002 (aged 19)	45	11	2020	Academy	Trainee	2024
20	Sam Bell	(England)	CF	23 May 2002 (aged 20)	35	5	2019	Academy	Trainee	Undisclosed
21	Nahki Wells	(Bermuda)	CF	1 June 1990 (aged 32)	145	29	2020	(England) Burnley	Undisclosed	2023
Out on loan
27	Dylan Kadji	(England)	DM/CM	1 September 2003 (aged 18)	4	1	2021	Academy	Trainee	Undisclosed
28	Sam Pearson	(Wales)	RW/LW	26 October 2001 (aged 20)	5	0	2020	Academy	Trainee	2024
30	Han-Noah Massengo	(France)	CM/DM	7 July 2001 (aged 21)	108	0	2019	(France) Monaco	£7,200,000	2023
31	Stefan Bajic	(France)	GK	23 December 2001 (aged 20)	1	0	2022	(France) Pau	Free transfer	2025
	Taylor Moore	(England)	CB/RB	12 May 1997 (aged 25)	61	1	2016	(France) Lens	£1,500,000	2023

== Statistics ==
As of 11 April 2023
Players with names in italics and marked * were on loan from another club for the whole of their season with Bristol City.

No.	Pos	Nat	Player	Total		Championship		FA Cup		League Cup	
No.	Pos	Nat	Player	Apps	Goals	Apps	Goals	Apps	Goals	Apps	Goals
2	DF	(England) ENG	Kane Wilson	7	1	0+5	0	0+0	0	2+0	1
3	DF	(England) ENG	Jay Dasilva	36	0	27+5	0	1+2	0	1+0	0
4	DF	(Scotland) SCO	Kal Naismith	26	1	20+1	0	3+0	0	2+0	1
5	DF	(England) ENG	Robert Atkinson	31	4	25+1	4	3+0	0	2+0	0
6	MF	(England) ENG	Matty James	34	0	28+1	0	4+0	0	0+1	0
7	MF	(England) ENG	Alex Scott	44	2	36+0	1	5+0	1	0+3	0
8	MF	(England) ENG	Joe Williams	35	2	21+10	2	0+3	0	0+1	0
9	FW	(England) ENG	Harry Cornick	13	1	4+9	1	0+0	0	0+0	0
10	MF	(Wales) WAL	Andy King	26	0	11+10	0	0+2	0	3+0	0
11	MF	(Albania) ALB	Anis Mehmeti	12	1	7+5	1	0+0	0	0+0	0
12	GK	(Republic of Ireland) IRL	Max O'Leary	31	0	27+0	0	4+0	0	0+0	0
14	FW	(Austria) AUT	Andreas Weimann	43	5	30+9	4	1+1	0	2+0	1
15	FW	(Scotland) SCO	Tommy Conway	33	10	22+7	7	1+0	0	1+2	3
16	DF	(England) ENG	Cameron Pring	32	1	24+3	1	3+0	0	2+0	0
17	MF	(Republic of Ireland) IRL	Mark Sykes	38	5	28+4	4	3+1	1	1+1	0
19	DF	(England) ENG	George Tanner	27	0	19+2	0	4+0	0	1+1	0
20	FW	(England) ENG	Sam Bell	24	5	9+10	2	2+2	3	0+1	0
21	FW	(Bermuda) BER	Nahki Wells	47	11	30+10	11	3+1	0	2+1	0
22	DF	(Czech Republic) CZE	Tomáš Kalas	8	0	2+5	0	1+0	0	0+0	0
26	DF	(England) ENG	Zak Vyner	46	1	40+0	1	4+0	0	1+1	0
27	MF	(England) ENG	Dylan Kadji	4	1	0+2	0	0+0	0	2+0	1
30	MF	(France) FRA	Han-Noah Massengo	12	0	6+4	0	0+0	0	2+0	0
31	GK	(France) FRA	Stefan Bajic	1	0	0+0	0	0+0	0	1+0	0
32	DF	(Wales) WAL	Joe Low	2	0	0+1	0	0+0	0	1+0	0
35	MF	(Wales) WAL	Omar Taylor-Clarke	9	0	3+3	0	0+3	0	0+0	0
36	MF	(Australia) AUS	Marlee Francois	2	0	0+0	0	0+2	0	0+0	0
Players who left the club during the season:
1	GK	(England) ENG	Dan Bentley	15	0	13+0	0	0+0	0	2+0	0
9	FW	(Scotland) SCO	Chris Martin	19	1	3+14	1	0+0	0	2+0	0
11	FW	(Ghana) GHA	Antoine Semenyo	27	8	11+12	6	2+0	1	1+1	1
25	DF	(Switzerland) SUI	Timm Klose	12	0	5+5	0	0+0	0	2+0	0

=== Goals record ===
As of 8 May 2023

Rank	No.	Nat.	Po.	Name	Championship	FA Cup	League Cup	Total	
1	15	(Scotland)	FW	Tommy Conway	9	0	3	12	
2	21	(Bermuda)	FW	Nahki Wells	11	0	0	11	
3	11	(Ghana)	FW	Antoine Semenyo	6	1	1	8	
4	14	(Austria)	FW	Andreas Weimann	6	0	1	7	
5	17	(Republic of Ireland)	MF	Mark Sykes	5	1	0	6	
5	20	(England)	FW	Sam Bell	3	3	0	6	
7	5	(England)	DF	Robert Atkinson	4	0	0	4	
8	7	(England)	MF	Alex Scott	1	1	0	2	
8	8	(England)	MF	Joe Williams	2	0	0	2	
10	2	(England)	DF	Kane Wilson	1	0	0	1	
10	4	(Scotland)	DF	Kal Naismith	0	0	1	1	
10	9	(Scotland)	FW	Chris Martin	1	0	0	1	
10	9	(England)	FW	Harry Cornick	1	0	0	1	
10	11	(Albania)	MF	Anis Mehmeti	1	0	0	1	
10	16	(England)	DF	Cameron Pring	1	0	0	1	
10	26	(England)	DF	Zak Vyner	1	0	0	1	
10	27	(England)	MF	Dylan Kadji	0	0	1	1	
10	Own Goals					2	0	0	2
Total					55	6	8	69	

=== Disciplinary record ===
As of 11 April 2023

Rank	No.	Nat.	Po.	Name	Championship			FA Cup			EFL Cup			Total		
Rank	No.	Nat.	Po.	Name	Booked	(yellow card) (yellow-red card)	Sent off (straight red)	Booked	(yellow card) (yellow-red card)	Sent off (straight red)	Booked	(yellow card) (yellow-red card)	Sent off (straight red)	Booked	(yellow card) (yellow-red card)	Sent off (straight red)
1	7	(England)	MF	Alex Scott	9	0	0	0	0	0	1	0	0	10	0	0
1	26	(England)	DF	Zak Vyner	8	0	0	0	0	0	1	0	0	9	0	0
3	8	(England)	MF	Joe Williams	7	0	0	1	0	0	0	0	0	8	0	0
3	16	(England)	DF	Cameron Pring	6	0	0	2	0	0	0	0	0	8	0	0
5	11	(England)	FW	Antoine Semenyo	5	0	0	1	0	0	0	0	0	6	0	0
6	6	(England)	CM	Matty James	5	0	0	0	0	0	0	0	0	5	0	0
6	14	(Austria)	FW	Andreas Weimann	5	0	0	0	0	0	0	0	0	5	0	0
6	17	(Republic of Ireland)	MF	Mark Sykes	5	0	0	0	0	0	0	0	0	5	0	0
9	21	(Bermuda)	FW	Nahki Wells	4	0	0	0	0	0	0	0	0	4	0	0
10	5	(England)	DF	Robert Atkinson	3	0	0	0	0	0	0	0	0	3	0	0
11	10	(Wales)	MF	Andy King	2	0	0	0	0	0	0	0	0	2	0	0
11	19	(England)	DF	George Tanner	1	0	1	0	0	0	0	0	0	1	0	1
11	25	(Switzerland)	DF	Timm Klose	2	0	0	0	0	0	0	0	0	2	0	0
11	30	(France)	MF	Han-Noah Massengo	2	0	0	0	0	0	0	0	0	2	0	0
11	32	(Wales)	DF	Joe Low	1	0	0	0	0	0	1	0	0	2	0	0
16	3	(England)	DF	Jay Dasilva	1	0	0	0	0	0	0	0	0	1	0	0
16	4	(Scotland)	DF	Kal Naismith	0	0	0	1	0	0	0	0	0	1	0	0
16	9	(England)	FW	Harry Cornick	1	0	0	0	0	0	0	0	0	1	0	0
16	~~9~~	(Scotland)	FW	Chris Martin	1	0	0	0	0	0	0	0	0	1	0	0
16	11	(Albania)	MF	Anis Mehmeti	1	0	0	0	0	0	0	0	0	1	0	0
16	15	(England)	FW	Tommy Conway	1	0	0	0	0	0	0	0	0	1	0	0
16	27	(England)	MF	Dylan Kadji	1	0	0	0	0	0	0	0	0	1	0	0
16	35	(Wales)	MF	Omar Taylor-Clarke	1	0	0	0	0	0	0	0	0	1	0	0
Total					71	0	1	5	0	0	3	0	0	79	0	1

== Transfers ==
=== In ===
Date	Position	Player	From	Fee	Ref.
10 June 2022 (Note: The transfer was announced on 14 May, and would become official on June 10 once the transfer window opened)	MF	(England) Ben Acey	(England) Guernsey	Free transfer	
10 June 2022 (Note: The transfer was announced on 14 May, and would become official on June 10 once the transfer window opened)	FW	(England) Tim Ap Sion	(England) Guernsey	Free transfer	
10 June 2022	DF	(England) Kane Wilson	(England) Forest Green Rovers	Compensation	
16 June 2022	MF	(England) Ewan Clark	(England) Oxford City	Undisclosed	
1 July 2022 (Note: The transfer was announced on 27 May, and would become official on July 1 once his Luton Town contract expired)	DF	(Scotland) Kal Naismith	(England) Luton Town	Free transfer	
1 July 2022 (Note: The transfer was announced on 16 May, and would become official on July 1 once his Oxford United contract expired)	MF	(Republic of Ireland) Mark Sykes	(England) Oxford United	Free transfer	
5 July 2022	GK	(France) Stefan Bajic	(France) Pau	Free transfer	
25 January 2023	GK	(Russia) Nikita Haikin	(Norway) Bodø/Glimt	Free transfer	
31 January 2023	MF	(Albania) Anis Mehmeti	(England) Wycombe Wanderers	Undisclosed	
31 January 2023	FW	(England) Harry Cornick	(England) Luton Town	£750,000	

=== Out ===
Date	Position	Player	To	Fee	Ref.
21 June 2022	MF	(Jamaica) Kasey Palmer	(England) Coventry City	£1,400,000	
30 June 2022	DF	(England) Khari Allen	Unattached	Released	
30 June 2022	FW	(England) Louis Britton	(Republic of Ireland) Cork City	Free transfer	
30 June 2022 (Note: The transfer was announced on 22 June, and would become official once his contract expired)	DF	(England) Robbie Cundy	(England) Barnsley	Free Transfer	
30 June 2022	FW	(The Gambia) Saikou Janneh	(England) Cambridge United	Free Transfer	
30 June 2022	GK	(England) Matt Martin	(England) Plymouth Argyle	Free Transfer	
30 June 2022	MF	(Republic of Ireland) Callum O'Dowda	(Wales) Cardiff City	Free transfer	
30 June 2022	DF	(Wales) Barney Soady	Unattached	Released	
30 June 2022	DF	(England) Nathaniel Williams	Unattached	Released	
13 July 2022	MF	(England) Reuben McAllister	(Scotland) Hibernian	Undisclosed	
21 July 2022	MF	(England) Tyreeq Bakinson	(England) Sheffield Wednesday	Undisclosed	
29 August 2022	DF	(England) Nathan Baker	Retired		
6 January 2023	DF	(England) Ryley Towler	(England) Portsmouth	Undisclosed	
25 January 2023	GK	(England) Dan Bentley	(England) Wolverhampton Wanderers	£2,000,000	
27 January 2023	FW	(Ghana) Antoine Semenyo	(England) AFC Bournemouth	£10,500,000	
31 January 2023	DF	(Switzerland) Timm Klose	Unattached	Contract Terminated	
31 January 2023	FW	(Scotland) Chris Martin	(England) Queens Park Rangers	Free transfer	
21 March 2023	GK	(Russia) Nikita Haikin	(Norway) Bodø/Glimt	Free transfer	

=== Loans out ===
Date from	Position	Player	To	Date until	Ref.
26 June 2022	FW	(England) Owura Edwards	(Scotland) Ross County	End of Season	
4 July 2022	DF	(England) Taylor Moore	(England) Shrewsbury Town	End of Season	
22 July 2022	DF	(England) James Taylor	(England) Cheltenham Town	3 January 2023 (Note: On 3 January, Taylor's loan at Cheltenham was cut short)	
23 July 2022	MF	(England) Tommy Backwell	(England) Bath City	1 January 2023	
23 July 2022	FW	(Wales) Zac Bell	(England) Bath City	1 January 2023	
23 July 2022	FW	(England) Prince Henry	(England) Yate Town	1 January 2023	
23 July 2022	FW	(Wales) Omar Taylor-Clarke	(England) Yate Town	1 September 2022 (Note: On 1 September, Taylor-Clarke was recalled from his loan at Yate.)	
28 July 2022	FW	(Wales) Sam Pearson	(England) Yeovil Town	1 January 2023 (Note: On August 24, Pearson's loan at Yeovil Town was extended until 1 January 2023.)	
2 August 2022	MF	(England) Seb Palmer-Houlden	(England) Chippenham Town	1 September 2022 (Note: On 1 September, Palmer-Holden was recalled from his loan at Chippenham.)	
5 August 2022	GK	(England) Will Buse	(England) Yeovil Town	End of Season	
18 August 2022	DF	(England) Duncan Idehen	(England) Carlisle United	8 December 2022 (Note: On 8 December, Duncan Idehen was recalled from his loan at Carlisle.)	
1 September 2022	DF	(England) Ryley Towler	(England) AFC Wimbledon	6 January 2023 (Note: On 6 January, Towler was recalled from AFC Wimbledon)	
14 September 2022	GK	(England) Harvey Wiles-Richards	(England) Hereford	12 October 2022	
16 September 2022	MF	(England) Josh Owers	(England) Gloucester City	6 December 2022 (Note: On 6 December, Josh Owers was recalled from his loan at Gloucester.)	
25 October 2022	FW	(England) Ewan Clark	(England) Yeovil Town	1 January 2023	
26 December 2022	MF	(England) Ben Acey	(England) Guernsey	26 January 2023	
4 January 2023	DF	(Wales) Joe Low	(England) Walsall	End of Season	
6 January 2023	GK	(England) Mac Boyd	(England) Melksham Town	3 February 2023	
6 January 2023	FW	(England) Brandon Oberteri	(England) Yate Town	3 February 2023	
6 January 2023	FW	(Wales) Sam Pearson	(England) AFC Wimbledon	End of Season	
6 January 2023	FW	(England) Olly Thomas	(England) Bath City	End of Season	
19 January 2023	GK	(France) Stefan Bajic	(France) Valenciennes	End of Season	
30 January 2023	MF	(France) Han-Noah Massengo	(France) Auxerre	End of Season	
31 January 2023	MF	(England) Dylan Kadji	(England) Swindon Town	End of Season	
25 February 2023	MF	(England) Josh Owers	(England) Yeovil Town	End of Season	
25 February 2023	MF	(England) Seb Palmer-Houlden	(England) Yeovil Town	End of Season	

== Pre-season and friendlies ==
Bristol City announced their first pre-season fixture on May 24, with a trip to Plymouth Argyle scheduled. A second friendly, against Bournemouth was later confirmed.

Win Draw Loss Fixtures

6 July 2022 Friendly	Bristol City	2–0	Cheltenham Town	Failand
14:00 BST	Tanner 70'; Conway 90'	Report		Stadium: Robins High Performance Centre; Attendance: 0 (behind-closed-doors)

12 July 2022 Friendly	Bristol City	0–0	Portsmouth	Failand
14:00 BST		Report		Stadium: Robins High Performance Centre
Note: 120-minute match.

16 July 2022 Friendly	Plymouth Argyle	0–1	Bristol City	Plymouth
15:00 BST		Report	Wells 82'	Stadium: Home Park

19 July 2022 Friendly	Bristol City	3–1	Forest Green Rovers	Failand
14:00 BST	Martin 28'; Weimann 46'; Sykes 51'	Report	March (?)	Stadium: Robins High Performance Centre

19 July 2022 Friendly	Bristol City	2–2	Exeter City	Failand
16:30 BST	Conway 77', 86'	Report	Coley 11' (?)	Stadium: Robins High Performance Centre

23 July 2022 Friendly	Bournemouth	0–1	Bristol City	Kings Park
15:00 BST		Report	Martin 49' (pen.)	Stadium: Vitality Stadium

== Competitions ==
=== Overall record ===
Competition	First match	Last match	Starting round	Record							
Competition	First match	Last match	Starting round	Pld	W	D	L	GF	GA	GD	Win %
Championship	30 July 2022	6 May 2023	Matchday 1	46	15	14	17	55	56	−1	32.61
FA Cup	8 January 2023	28 February 2023	Third round	4	2	1	1	6	5	+1	50.00
EFL Cup	10 August 2022	8 November 2022	First round	3	2	0	1	8	5	+3	66.67
Total				53	19	15	19	69	66	+3	35.85

Last updated: 15 May 2023
Source: [ EPL Website ]

=== Championship ===
==== League table ====
Pos	Team	Pld	W	D	L	GF	GA	GD	Pts
11	Watford	46	16	15	15	56	53	+3	63
12	Preston North End	46	17	12	17	45	59	−14	63
13	Norwich City	46	17	11	18	57	54	+3	62
14	Bristol City	46	15	14	17	55	56	−1	59
15	Hull City	46	14	16	16	51	61	−10	58
16	Stoke City	46	14	11	21	55	54	+1	53
17	Birmingham City	46	14	11	21	47	58	−11	53

Source: EFL Official Website
Rules for classification: 1) Points; 2) Goal difference; 3) Number of goals scored; 4) Head-to-head results; 5) Wins; 6) Away goals; 7) Penalty points (sec 9.5); 8) 12-point sending off offences

==== Results summary ====
Overall								Home						Away					
Pld	W	D	L	GF	GA	GD	Pts	W	D	L	GF	GA	GD	W	D	L	GF	GA	GD
46	15	14	17	55	56	−1	59	9	7	7	30	24	+6	6	7	10	25	32	−7

Last updated: 15 May 2023.
Source: [ EPL website ]

==== Results by round ====
Round	1	2	3	4	5	6	7	8	9	10	11	12	13	14	15	16	17	18	19	20	21	22	23	24	25	26	27	28	29	30	31	32	33	34	35	36	37	38	39	40	41	42	43	44	45	46
Ground	A	H	A	H	H	A	H	A	A	A	H	H	A	H	H	A	A	H	H	A	H	A	H	H	A	A	H	H	A	H	H	A	H	A	A	H	A	A	H	A	H	A	A	H	H	A
Result	L	L	D	W	W	D	W	W	L	L	L	D	L	W	L	W	L	D	L	D	D	W	L	L	D	D	W	D	W	W	D	D	W	L	D	W	L	L	D	W	D	L	L	W	L	W
Position	18	23	23	15	7	9	7	4	7	10	12	14	18	11	17	12	13	14	15	16	18	16	18	18	19	19	17	17	17	13	16	15	13	14	13	13	13	14	14	13	13	15	15	14	14	14

Updated to match(es) played on 15 May 2023. Source: [ EPL website ]
A = Away; H = Home; W = Win; D = Draw; L = Loss; P = Postponed

==== Matches ====
Win Draw Loss Fixtures

On 23 June, the league fixtures were announced.

30 July 2022 1	Hull City	2–1	Bristol City	Kingston-upon-Hull
15:00 BST	Tufan 72' (pen.); Seri 90+3'	Report	Weimann 30'	Stadium: MKM Stadium; Attendance: 16,667; Referee: Dean Whitestone

6 August 2022 2	Bristol City	2–3	Sunderland	Ashton Gate
15:00 BST	Weimann 10'; Williams (yellow card) 27'; Martin 51'; Sykes (yellow card) 58'	Report	Evans (yellow card) 1'; Simms 4', 53'; Cirkin (yellow card) 20'; Stewart 72'	Stadium: Ashton Gate; Attendance: 24,543; Referee: Keith Stroud

13 August 2022 3	Wigan Athletic	1–1	Bristol City	Wigan
15:00 BST	Bennett (yellow card) 18'; Keane 67'	Report	Weimann 6'; Atkinson (yellow card) 62'; Klose (yellow card) 75'	Stadium: DW Stadium; Attendance: 9,822; Referee: John Busby

16 August 2022 4	Bristol City	2–0	Luton Town	Ashton Gate
19:45 BST	Wells 5', (yellow card) 61'; Conway 27'; Sykes (red card) 67'; Weimann (yellow card) 67'	Report	Freeman (yellow card) 67'; Bradley (yellow card) 76'	Stadium: Ashton Gate; Attendance: 17,329; Referee: Leigh Doughty

21 August 2022 5	Bristol City	2–0	Cardiff City	Ashton Gate
12:00 BST	Massengo (yellow card) 36'; Conway 41'; Vyner (yellow card) 60'; Atkinson 64'; Williams (yellow card) 81'; Scott (yellow card) 89'	Report	Kipré (yellow card) 63'; Colwill (yellow card) 75'; Wintle (yellow card) 89'	Stadium: Ashton Gate; Attendance: 21,649; Referee: Thomas Bramall

27 August 2022 6	Blackpool	3–3	Bristol City	Blackpool
15:00 BST	Bowler 7'; Yates 55'; Lawrence-Gabriel (yellow card) 65'; Corbeanu 90'	Report	Conway 44'; Scott (yellow card) 51'; Semenyo 63', (yellow card) 77'; Ekpiteta 70' (o.g.); Atkinson (yellow card) 85'; Williams (yellow card) 87'; King (yellow card) 90+3'	Stadium: Bloomfield Road; Attendance: 10,804; Referee: Jeremy Simpson

31 August 2022 7	Bristol City	2–0	Huddersfield Town	Ashton Gate
19:45 BST	Wells 35'; Semenyo 80'	Report		Stadium: Ashton Gate; Attendance: 18,569; Referee: Darren Bond

3 September 2022 8	Blackburn Rovers	2–3	Bristol City	Blackburn
15:00 BST	Wharton (yellow card) 7'; Pickering (yellow card) 67'; Dolan 71'; Brereton Díaz 90+3'	Report	Conway 42'; Wells 55', 73'; James (yellow card) 57'; Scott (yellow card) 58'	Stadium: Ewood Park; Attendance: 12,502; Referee: Tim Robinson

10 September 2022	Bristol City	Postponed	Preston North End	Ashton Gate
15:00 BST				Stadium: Ashton Gate
Note: Fixture was postponed as a mark of respect following the passing of Queen Elizabeth II.

14 September 2022 9	Norwich City	3–2	Bristol City	Norwich
19:45 BST	Pukki 11', 23'; Sargent 65'	Report	Conway 44'; Semenyo 77'	Stadium: Carrow Road; Attendance: 25,287; Referee: David Webb

17 September 2022 10	Burnley	2–1	Bristol City	Burnley
15:00 BST	Benson 4'; Rodriguez 67'; Cork (yellow card) 89'	Report	Wells 27'; Scott (yellow card) 32'	Stadium: Turf Moor; Attendance: 19,742; Referee: Oliver Langford

1 October 2022 11	Bristol City	1–2	Queens Park Rangers	Ashton Gate
15:00 BST	Williams (yellow card) 53'; Wells 61'; Massengo (yellow card) 76'; Scott (yellow card) 90+5'	Report	Johansen 19'; Roberts 22'; Amos (yellow card) 86'	Stadium: Ashton Gate; Attendance: 21,649; Referee: Jeremy Simpson

4 October 2022 12	Bristol City	0–0	Coventry City	Ashton Gate
19:45 BST	Atkinson (yellow card) 11'; Williams (yellow card) 78'	Report	Sheaf (yellow card) 79'	Stadium: Ashton Gate; Attendance: 18,658; Referee: James Bell

8 October 2022 13	Birmingham City	3–0	Bristol City	Bordesley
15:00 BST	Trusty 3' 43'; Mejbri (yellow card) 45+1'; Sanderson (yellow card) 52' (goal) 75'; Bielik (yellow card) 68'	Report	Scott (yellow card) 64'; Kadji (yellow card) 80'	Stadium: St. Andrew's Stadium; Attendance: 16,807; Referee: James Linington

12 October 2022 14	Bristol City	2–1	Preston North End	Ashton Gate
19:45 BST	Dasilva (yellow card) 34'; Atkinson 54' 90'; Vyner (yellow card) 67'; Weimann (yellow card) 81'	Report	Lindsay (yellow card) 29'; Woodburn (yellow card) 78'; Hughes 82'; Cunningham (yellow card) 84'; Brady (yellow card) 90+6'	Stadium: Ashton Gate; Attendance: 17,367; Referee: Keith Stroud

15 October 2022 15	Bristol City	1–2	Millwall	Ashton Gate
15:00 BST	Klose (yellow card) 43'; Semenyo (yellow card) 53'; Hutchinson 71' (o.g.)	Report	Bradshaw 44'; Cooper (yellow card) 53'; Wallace (yellow card) 57'; Flemming 76'; McNamara (yellow card) 90+2'; Afobe (penalty missed) 90+7'	Stadium: Ashton Gate; Attendance: 19,122; Referee: Gavin Ward

18 October 2022 16	West Bromwich Albion	0–2	Bristol City	West Bromwich
20:00 BST	Livermore (yellow card) 31'; Kelly (yellow card) 34'; O'Shea (yellow card) 90+1'	Report	Williams 32'; Wells 45'; Sykes (yellow card) 71'	Stadium: The Hawthorns; Attendance: 21,004; Referee: Bobby Madley

22 October 2022 17	Reading	2–0	Bristol City	Reading
15:00 BST	Loum 52' (yellow card) 90+1'; Rahman (yellow card) 78'; Carroll 90+4'	Report	Conway (yellow card) 65'; Pring (yellow card) 76'; Martin (yellow card) 90'	Stadium: Select Car Leasing Stadium; Attendance: 13,606; Referee: John Busby

29 October 2022 18	Bristol City	1–1	Swansea City	Ashton Gate
12:00 BST	Conway 24'; Pring (yellow card) 90+4'	Report	Ntcham 76'	Stadium: Ashton Gate; Attendance: 21,007; Referee: Andre Marriner

1 November 2022 19	Bristol City	0–1	Sheffield United	Ashton Gate
20:00 GMT	Scott (yellow card) 40'; James (yellow card) 51'; Tanner (red card) 90+6'; Williams (yellow card) 90+7'	Report	Ndiaye 49' (yellow card) 70'; McAtee (yellow card) 62'; Egan (yellow card) 81'; Clark (yellow card) 86'; Baldock (yellow card) 90+7'	Stadium: Ashton Gate; Attendance: 17,437; Referee: Stephen Martin

5 November 2022 20	Middlesbrough	1–1	Bristol City	Middlesbrough
15:00 GMT	Giles (yellow card) 25'; Akpom 47'; McGree (yellow card) 74'; Smith (yellow card) 82'	Report	Weimann 10'; Low (yellow card) 89'; Vyner (yellow card) 90+1'	Stadium: Riverside Stadium; Attendance: 23,899; Referee: Matt Donohue

12 November 2022 21	Bristol City	0–0	Watford	Ashton Gate
15:00 GMT	Scott (yellow card) 88'	Report	Gaspar (yellow card) 53'	Stadium: Ashton Gate; Attendance: 23,501; Referee: David Webb

10 December 2022 22	Rotherham United	1–3	Bristol City	Rotherham
12:30 GMT	Ogbene 25'; Wood (yellow card) 39'	Report	Harding 14' (o.g.); Williams 30'; King (yellow card) 43'; Wells (yellow card) 50'; Pring (yellow card) 60', (goal) 73'; Semenyo (yellow card) 90+1'	Stadium: AESSEAL New York Stadium; Attendance: 10,167; Referee: Sam Barrott

17 December 2022 23	Bristol City	1–2	Stoke City	Ashton Gate
15:00 GMT	Wells 33'; Weimann (yellow card) 76'; Semenyo (yellow card) 89'; Pring (yellow card) 90+5'	Report	Delap 45+2', (yellow card) 61'; Brown 57'; Bonham (yellow card) 83'; Powell (yellow card) 84'; Campbell (yellow card) 90+6'	Stadium: Ashton Gate; Attendance: 15,617; Referee: Geoff Eltringham

26 December 2022 24	Bristol City	0–2	West Bromwich Albion	Ashton Gate
15:00 GMT	Williams (yellow card) 65'; James (yellow card) 70'	Report	Phillips 9'; Thomas-Asante 75'; Furlong (yellow card) 88'	Stadium: Ashton Gate; Attendance: 23,181; Referee: Steve Martin

29 December 2022 25	Millwall	0–0	Bristol City	Bermondsey
19:45 GMT		Report		Stadium: The Den; Attendance: 14,814; Referee: Dean Whitestone

1 January 2023 26	Coventry City	1–1	Bristol City	Coventry
15:00 GMT	Bidwell 12'; Panzo (yellow card) 43'; Dabo (yellow card) 72'; Allen (yellow card) 90+3'	Report	Semenyo 28'; Vyner (yellow card) 35'; Weimann (yellow card) 76'	Stadium: Coventry Building Society Arena; Attendance: 19,547; Referee: Jeremy Simpson

14 January 2023 27	Bristol City	4–2	Birmingham City	Ashton Gate
15:00 GMT	Semenyo 17', (yellow card) 90+6'; Wells 21'; Pring (yellow card) 33'; Sykes 47', 66'	Report	Long (yellow card) 12'; Deeney 34' (pen.); Khadra 76'	Stadium: Ashton Gate Stadium; Attendance: 21,489; Referee: John Busby

21 January 2023 28	Bristol City	1–1	Blackburn Rovers	Ashton Gate
15:00 GMT	Semenyo 68'; Vyner (yellow card) 79'	Report	Ayala (yellow card) 38' (yellow-red card) 74'; Wharton (yellow card) 43'; Dack 54'	Stadium: Ashton Gate; Attendance: 19,882; Referee: Tim Robinson

4 February 2023 29	Preston North End	1–2	Bristol City	Preston
15:00 GMT	Storey (yellow card) 33'; Evans 61'		Sykes 6'; Bell 45+3'; James (yellow card) 50'; Wells (yellow card) 63'; Cornick (yellow card) 70'; Scott (yellow card) 72'	Stadium: Deepdale; Attendance: 14,261; Referee: Leigh Doughty

11 February 2023 30	Bristol City	1–0	Norwich City	Ashton Gate
15:00 GMT	Sykes 24'; Williams (yellow card) 58'	Report	McLean (yellow card) 31'; Aarons (yellow card) 57'; Omobamidele (yellow card) 78'	Stadium: Ashton Gate Stadium; Attendance: 23,757; Referee: Chris Kavanagh

15 February 2023 31	Bristol City	1–1	Wigan Athletic	Ashton Gate
19:45 GMT	Atkinson 36'; Tanner (yellow card) 90+1'; Sykes (yellow card) 90+3'	Report	Fletcher 65'; Nyambe (yellow card) 72'; Whatmough (yellow card) 81'; McClean (yellow card) 90+2'	Stadium: Ashton Gate Stadium; Attendance: 18,766; Referee: Keith Stroud

18 February 2023 32	Sunderland	1–1	Bristol City	Sunderland
15:00 GMT	Clarke 59'; O'Nien (yellow card) 82'	Report	Wells 90+3' (pen.)	Stadium: Stadium of Light; Attendance: 38,682; Referee: Gavin Ward

25 February 2023 33	Bristol City	1–0	Hull City	Ashton Gate
15:00 GMT	Wells 70' (pen.)	Report	Coyle (yellow card) 82'	Stadium: Ashton Gate Stadium; Attendance: 20,334; Referee: Sam Barrott

5 March 2023 34	Cardiff City	2–0	Bristol City	Leckwith
12:30 GMT	Kaba 52'; Philogene 70'; Allsop (red card) 90+1'	Report		Stadium: Cardiff City Stadium; Attendance: 22,156; Referee: Matt Donohue

7 March 2023 35	Huddersfield Town	0–0	Bristol City	Huddersfield
19:45 GMT	Jackson (yellow card) 14'; Pearson (yellow card) 26'; Hogg (yellow card) 45+3'	Report	Vyner (yellow card) 67'; Pring (yellow card) 88'	Stadium: The John's Smith Stadium; Attendance: 17,177; Referee: Leigh Doughty

11 March 2023 36	Bristol City	2–0	Blackpool	Ashton Gate
12:30 GMT	Weimann 58'; Scott 81'		Rogers (yellow card) 75'	Stadium: Ashton Gate; Attendance: 19,070; Referee: Darren Bond

15 March 2023 37	Luton Town	1–0	Bristol City	Luton
19:45 GMT	Morris 4', (yellow card) 34'; Berry (yellow card) 62'; Bell (yellow card) 78'; Adebayo (yellow card) 80'	Report	Vyner (yellow card) 51'; Pring (yellow card) 64'; Sykes (yellow card) 73'	Stadium: Kenilworth Stadium; Attendance: 9,899; Referee: John Busby

19 March 2023 38	Swansea City	2–0	Bristol City	Landore
12:30 GMT	Cullen 34'; Ntcham 77'; Manning (yellow card) 82'; Piroe (yellow card) 82'	Report	Wells (yellow card) 74'; Sykes (yellow card) 82'	Stadium: Swansea.com Stadium; Attendance: 16,730; Referee: Jeremy Simpson

1 April 2023 39	Bristol City	1–1	Reading	Ashton Gate
15:00 BST	Taylor-Clarke (yellow card) 23'; Conway 45+2'; Mehmeti (yellow card) 65'; James (yellow card) 71'	Report	Holmes (yellow card) 4'; João 72'; Yiadom (yellow card) 76'	Stadium: Ashton Gate Stadium; Attendance: 20,526; Referee: Stephen Martin

7 April 2023 40	Stoke City	1–2	Bristol City	Stoke on Trent
15:00 BST	Powell 36'; Laurent (yellow card) 71'	Report	Vyner 72'; Mehmeti 85'	Stadium: Bet365 Stadium; Attendance: 22,826; Referee: Oliver Langford

10 April 2023 41	Bristol City	2–2	Middlesbrough	Ashton Gate
17:30 BST	Vyner (yellow card) 22'; Bell 45+1'; Weimann (yellow card) 51'; Cornick 49'	Report	Ramsey 58'; Crooks 64'; Smith (yellow card) 86'	Stadium: Ashton Gate Stadium; Attendance: 21,726; Referee: Tim Robinson

15 April 2023 42	Watford	2–0	Bristol City	Watford
15:00 BST	Cornick 6' (o.g.); Pedro 54'; Porteous (yellow card) 61'	Report	Tanner (yellow card) 27'; James (yellow card) 84'; Mehmeti (yellow card) 90+4'	Stadium: Vicarage Road; Attendance: 19,148; Referee: Dean Whitestone

18 April 2023 43	Sheffield United	1–0	Bristol City	Sheffield
19:45 BST	McAtee 77'; Baldock (yellow card) 90+3'	Report	Pring (yellow card) 54'; Cornick (yellow card) 60'	Stadium: Bramall Lane; Attendance: 26,476; Referee: Geoff Eltringham

22 April 2023 44	Bristol City	2–1	Rotherham United	Ashton Gate
15:00 BST	Conway 15'; Scott (yellow card) 66'; Weimann (yellow card) 88', (goal) 90+1'; Nigel Pearson (yellow card) off the pitch'	Report	Humphreys (yellow card) 39'; Hugill (yellow card) 52', (goal) 67' (pen.); Bramall (yellow card) 56'	Stadium: Ashton Gate Stadium; Attendance: 19,350; Referee: Josh Smith

29 April 2023 45	Bristol City	1–2	Burnley	Ashton Gate
15:00 BST	Conway 60'; Weimann (yellow card) 88'	Report	Benson 33'; Rodriguez 62'	Stadium: Ashton Gate Stadium; Attendance: 24,065; Referee: David Webb

8 May 2023 46	Queens Park Rangers	0-2	Bristol City	Shepherd's Bush
15:00 BST		Report	Vyner (yellow card) 15'; Sykes 28'; Bell 55'	Stadium: Loftus Road Stadium; Attendance: 17,335; Referee: Andy Woolmer

=== FA Cup ===
The Robins were drawn at home to Swansea City in the third round, against West Bromwich Albion in the fourth round and also to Manchester City in the fifth round.

Win Draw Loss Fixtures

8 January 2023 Third round	Bristol City	1–1	Swansea City	Ashton Gate
12:30 GMT	Naismith (yellow card) 39'; Semenyo 75'; Pring (yellow card) 84'	Report	Piroe 15'; Allen (yellow card) 45+3'; Wood (yellow card) 62'; Darling (yellow card) 69'	Stadium: Ashton Gate; Attendance: 12,145; Referee: Craig Pawson

17 January 2023 Third round replay	Swansea City	1–2 (a.e.t.)	Bristol City	Landore
19:45 GMT	Cooper 73'; Wood (yellow card) 90+4'; Cundle (yellow card) 94'; Latibeaudiere (yellow card) 120+2'	Report	Sykes 62'; Pring (yellow card) 75'; Bell 112'; Semenyo (yellow card) 120+2'	Stadium: Swansea.com Stadium; Attendance: 10,030; Referee: Graham Scott

28 January 2023 Fourth round	Bristol City	3–0	West Bromwich Albion	Ashton Gate
15:00 GMT	Bell 12', 48'; Scott 28'	Report	Wallace (yellow card) 58'; Furlong (yellow card) 60'	Stadium: Ashton Gate; Attendance: 15,754; Referee: Matt Donohue

28 February 2023 Fifth round	Bristol City	0–3	Manchester City	Ashton Gate
20:00 GMT	Williams (yellow card) 87'	Report	Foden 7', (yellow card) 66', (goal) 74'; De Bruyne 81'; Silva (yellow card) 87'	Stadium: Ashton Gate Stadium; Attendance: 25,713; Referee: Andre Marriner

=== EFL Cup ===
Win Draw Loss Fixtures

Bristol City were drawn away to Coventry City in the first round and to Wycombe Wanderers in the second round.

10 August 2022 First round	Coventry City	1–4	Bristol City	Burton upon Trent
19:45 BST	Walker (yellow card) 34'; Allen 62'	Report	Vyner (yellow card) 1'; Naismith 12'; Conway 18', 30'; Weimann 90+4'	Stadium: Pirelli Stadium; Attendance: 2,680; Referee: Peter Wright

24 August 2022 Second round	Wycombe Wanderers	1–3	Bristol City	High Wycombe
19:45 BST	Al-Hamadi 50'; Gape (yellow card) 78'	Report	Kadji 7'; Wilson 77'; Semenyo 90+3'	Stadium: Adams Park; Attendance: 3,116; Referee: Andy Davies

8 November 2022 Third round	Bristol City	1–3	Lincoln City	Ashton Gate
19:45 GMT	Low (yellow card) 34'; Conway 80'	Report	Virtue 6'; House 15'; O'Connor 49'	Stadium: Ashton Gate; Attendance: 7,961; Referee: Sam Allison
