= 2020–21 Bristol City F.C. season =

Bristol City F.C.
2020–21 season
- Owner: Stephen Lansdown
- Manager: Dean Holden (until 16 February); Nigel Pearson (from 22 February)
- Stadium: Ashton Gate Stadium
- EFL Championship: 19th
- FA Cup: Fifth round
- EFL Cup: Third round
- Top goalscorer: League: Nahki Wells (9); All: Famara Diédhiou (10); Nahki Wells (10)
Home colours	Away colours	Third colours

The 2020–21 season is Bristol City Football Club's 123rd season in existence and sixth consecutive season in the Championship. They also competed in the FA Cup and competed in the EFL Cup.

== Squad ==
As of 14 August 2020

Note: Flags indicate national team as has been defined under FIFA eligibility rules. Players may hold more than one non-FIFA nationality.

No.	Name	Nat.	Position(s)	Date of birth (age)	Apps.	Goals	Year signed	Signed from	Transfer fee	Ends
Goalkeepers
1	Dan Bentley	(England)	GK	13 July 1993 (aged 27)	89	0	2019	(England) Brentford	Undisclosed	2023
12	Max O'Leary	(England)	GK	10 October 1996 (aged 24)	25	0	2015	Academy	Trainee	2021
13	Joe Wollacott	(England)	GK	8 September 1996 (aged 24)	0	0	2013	Academy	Trainee	2021
Defenders
2	Jack Hunt	(England)	RB/RM	6 December 1990 (aged 30)	114	4	2018	(England) Sheffield Wednesday	Undisclosed	2021
3	Jay Dasilva	(England)	LB/LM	22 April 1998 (aged 23)	69	1	2019	(England) Chelsea	Undisclosed	2023
5	Alfie Mawson	(England)	CB	19 January 1994 (aged 27)	13	0	2020	(England) Fulham	Loan	2021
6	Nathan Baker	(England)	CB	23 April 1991 (aged 30)	133	3	2017	(England) Aston Villa	Undisclosed	2023
16	Cameron Pring	(England)	LB	22 January 1998 (aged 23)	0	0	2016	Academy	Trainee	2021
19	Adrian Mariappa	(Jamaica) (England)	CB/RB	3 November 1986 (aged 34)	26	0	2020	Free Agent	Free	2022
22	Tomáš Kalas	(Czech Republic)	CB	15 May 1993 (aged 28)	108	1	2019	(England) Chelsea	£8,000,000	2023
23	Taylor Moore	(England)	CB/RB	12 May 1997 (aged 24)	59	1	2016	(France) Lens	£1,500,000	2023
26	Zak Vyner	(England)	CB/RB	14 May 1997 (aged 24)	70	1	2015	Academy	Trainee	2023
29	Danny Simpson	(England)	RB	4 January 1987 (aged 34)	4	0	2021	Free Agent	Free	2021
43	Steven Sessegnon	(England)	RB/LB/CB	18 May 2000 (aged 21)	18	0	2020	(England) Fulham	Loan	2021
Defenders
4	Ádám Nagy	(Hungary)	DM/CM	17 June 1995 (aged 26)	60	3	2019	(Italy) Bologna	£1,800,000	2022
8	Liam Walsh	(England)	CM/AM/DM	15 September 1997 (aged 23)	22	1	2018	(England) Everton	£990,000	2021
11	Callum O'Dowda	(Republic of Ireland) (England)	LM/AM/RM	23 April 1995 (aged 26)	154	9	2016	(England) Oxford United	£1,250,000	2022
17	Henri Lansbury	(England)	CM/AM	12 October 1990 (aged 30)	16	0	2021	(England) Aston Villa	Free	2021
20	Joe Williams	(England)	DM/CM	8 December 1996 (aged 24)	2	0	2020	(England) Wigan Athletic	£1,200,000	2024
25	Tommy Rowe	(England)	LM/LB/CM	24 September 1988 (aged 32)	67	3	2019	(England) Doncaster Rovers	Free	2021
27	Opi Edwards	(Ghana)	RM/RW	30 April 1999 (aged 22)	6	0	2017	Academy	Trainee	2021
30	Tyreeq Bakinson	(England)	DM/CM	10 October 1998 (aged 22)	39	4	2017	(England) Luton Town	Undisclosed	2021
31	Hakeeb Adelakun	(England)	RW/LW	11 June 1996 (aged 25)	9	0	2018	(England) Scunthorpe United	Free	2021
32	James Morton	(England)	DM/CM	22 April 1999 (aged 22)	1	0	2017	Academy	Trainee	2021
34	Ryley Towler	(England)	DM/CB/LB	6 May 2002 (aged 19)	4	0	2020	Academy	Trainee	2021
42	Han-Noah Massengo	(France)	CM/DM	7 July 2001 (aged 19)	58	0	2019	(France) Monaco	£7,200,000	2023
45	Kasey Palmer	(Jamaica) (England)	AM/LW/RW	9 November 1996 (aged 24)	63	7	2019	(England) Chelsea	£3,500,000	2023
Forwards
7	Chris Martin	(Scotland) (England)	CF/SS	4 November 1988 (aged 32)	30	4	2020	(England) Derby County	Free	2022
9	Famara Diédhiou	(Senegal)	CF	15 December 1992 (aged 28)	168	51	2017	(France) Angers	£5,300,000	2021
10	Jamie Paterson	(England)	SS/LW/RW	20 December 1991 (aged 29)	157	26	2016	(England) Nottingham Forest	Undisclosed	2021
14	Andreas Weimann	(Austria)	SS/CF/RW/LW	5 August 1991 (aged 29)	101	21	2018	(England) Derby County	Undisclosed	2021
15	Marley Watkins	(Wales) (England)	CF/RW	17 October 1990 (aged 30)	29	3	2018	(England) Barnsley	£1,000,000	2021
18	Antoine Semenyo	(England)	CF/LW	7 January 2000 (aged 21)	65	5	2019	Academy	Trainee	2023
21	Nahki Wells	(Bermuda)	CF	1 June 1990 (aged 31)	66	15	2020	(England) Burnley	Undisclosed	2023
33	Sam Bell	(England)	CF	23 May 2002 (aged 19)	4	0	2019	Academy	Trainee	2024

=== Statistics ===
As of 8 May 2021

No.	Pos	Nat	Player	Total		Championship		FA Cup		League Cup	
No.	Pos	Nat	Player	Apps	Goals	Apps	Goals	Apps	Goals	Apps	Goals
1	GK	(England) ENG	Dan Bentley	44	0	42+0	0	1+0	0	1+0	0
2	DF	(England) ENG	Jack Hunt	42	2	36+4	2	1+0	0	1+0	0
3	DF	(England) ENG	Jay Dasilva	12	1	9+2	1	0+0	0	1+0	0
4	MF	(Hungary) HUN	Ádám Nagy	34	2	24+6	2	1+1	0	2+0	0
5	DF	(England) ENG	Alfie Mawson	13	0	10+0	0	2+0	0	1+0	0
6	DF	(England) ENG	Nathan Baker	3	0	2+1	0	0+0	0	0+0	0
7	FW	(Scotland) SCO	Chris Martin	30	4	20+6	2	1+1	1	1+1	1
8	MF	(England) ENG	Liam Walsh	3	0	1+2	0	0+0	0	0+0	0
9	FW	(Senegal) SEN	Famara Diédhiou	44	10	22+17	8	3+0	2	2+0	0
10	FW	(England) ENG	Jamie Paterson	23	4	15+6	3	1+0	0	1+0	1
11	MF	(Republic of Ireland) IRL	Callum O'Dowda	19	1	14+5	1	0+0	0	0+0	0
12	GK	(England) ENG	Max O'Leary	8	0	4+0	0	2+0	0	2+0	0
14	FW	(Austria) AUT	Andreas Weimann	8	2	7+0	2	0+0	0	1+0	0
15	FW	(Wales) WAL	Marley Watkins	2	0	0+2	0	0+0	0	0+0	0
17	MF	(England) ENG	Henri Lansbury	16	0	12+4	0	0+0	0	0+0	0
18	FW	(England) ENG	Antoine Semenyo	49	5	23+20	2	2+1	1	2+1	2
19	DF	(Jamaica) JAM	Adrian Mariappa	25	0	17+6	0	2+0	0	0+0	0
20	MF	(England) ENG	Joe Williams	2	0	1+0	0	1+0	0	0+0	0
21	FW	(Bermuda) BER	Nahki Wells	48	10	36+8	9	2+1	1	1+0	0
22	DF	(Czech Republic) CZE	Tomáš Kalas	43	1	37+2	1	3+0	0	1+0	0
23	DF	(England) ENG	Taylor Moore	29	0	16+7	0	2+1	0	2+1	0
25	MF	(England) ENG	Tommy Rowe	36	1	27+4	1	2+0	0	2+1	0
26	DF	(England) ENG	Zak Vyner	47	1	37+5	1	2+0	0	3+0	0
27	MF	(Ghana) GHA	Opi Edwards	4	0	0+4	0	0+0	0	0+0	0
28	MF	(Wales) WAL	Sam Pearson	4	0	2+2	0	0+0	0	0+0	0
29	DF	(England) ENG	Danny Simpson	4	0	3+1	0	0+0	0	0+0	0
30	MF	(England) ENG	Tyreeq Bakinson	37	4	20+12	4	2+0	0	1+2	0
31	MF	(England) ENG	Hakeeb Adelakun	4	0	2+0	0	1+1	0	0+0	0
33	FW	(England) ENG	Sam Bell	5	0	1+3	0	0+1	0	0+0	0
34	MF	(England) ENG	Ryley Towler	4	0	3+0	0	1+0	0	0+0	0
35	MF	(England) ENG	Owura Edwards	3	0	0+2	0	1+0	0	0+0	0
36	MF	(England) ENG	Alex Scott	3	0	1+2	0	0+0	0	0+0	0
37	FW	(England) ENG	Tommy Conway	6	1	3+3	1	0+0	0	0+0	0
40	FW	(England) ENG	Louis Britton	1	0	0+1	0	0+0	0	0+0	0
42	MF	(France) FRA	Han-Noah Massengo	31	0	18+8	0	0+3	0	1+1	0
43	DF	(England) ENG	Steven Sessegnon	18	0	10+6	0	0+0	0	2+0	0
45	MF	(Jamaica) JAM	Kasey Palmer	26	4	16+6	2	1+1	0	2+0	2
46	FW	(The Gambia) GAM	Saikou Janneh	4	0	0+4	0	0+0	0	0+0	0
Players out on loan:
32	MF	(England) ENG	James Morton	1	0	0+0	0	0+0	0	0+1	0
Players that left the club:
19	MF	(Sweden) SWE	Niclas Eliasson	2	0	0+0	0	0+0	0	2+0	0
29	MF	(Northern Ireland) NIR	Chris Brunt	14	0	5+7	0	0+0	0	1+1	0

==== Goals record ====
As of 8 May 2021

Rank	No.	Nat.	Po.	Name	Championship	FA Cup	League Cup	Total
1	9	(Senegal)	CF	Famara Diédhiou	8	2	0	10
1	21	(Bermuda)	CF	Nahki Wells	9	1	0	10
3	18	(England)	CF	Antoine Semenyo	2	1	2	5
4	7	(Scotland)	CF	Chris Martin	2	1	1	4
4	10	(England)	SS	Jamie Paterson	3	0	1	4
4	30	(England)	DM	Tyreeq Bakinson	4	0	0	4
4	45	(Jamaica)	AM	Kasey Palmer	2	0	2	4
8	2	(England)	RB	Jack Hunt	2	0	0	2
8	4	(Hungary)	DM	Ádám Nagy	2	0	0	2
8	14	(Austria)	SS	Andreas Weimann	2	0	0	2
11	3	(England)	LB	Jay Dasilva	1	0	0	1
11	11	(Republic of Ireland)	LM	Callum O'Dowda	1	0	0	1
11	22	(Czech Republic)	CB	Tomáš Kalas	1	0	0	1
11	25	(England)	LM	Tommy Rowe	1	0	0	1
11	26	(England)	CB	Zak Vyner	1	0	0	1
11	37	(England)	CF	Tommy Conway	1	0	0	1
11	40	(England)	CF	Louis Britton	1	0	0	1
Own Goals					1	0	0	1
Total					44	5	6	55

=== Disciplinary record ===
As of 8 May 2021

Rank	No.	Nat.	Po.	Name	Championship			FA Cup			League Cup			Total		
Rank	No.	Nat.	Po.	Name	Booked	(yellow card) (yellow-red card)	Sent off (straight red)	Booked	(yellow card) (yellow-red card)	Sent off (straight red)	Booked	(yellow card) (yellow-red card)	Sent off (straight red)	Booked	(yellow card) (yellow-red card)	Sent off (straight red)
1	2	(England)	RB	Jack Hunt	5	0	0	0	0	0	1	0	0	6	0	0
1	9	(Senegal)	CF	Famara Diédhiou	4	1	0	0	0	0	0	0	0	4	1	0
1	17	(England)	CM	Henri Lansbury	5	0	1	0	0	0	0	0	0	5	0	1
1	45	(Jamaica)	AM	Kasey Palmer	6	0	0	0	0	0	0	0	0	6	0	0
5	21	(Bermuda)	CF	Nahki Wells	4	0	0	0	0	0	0	0	0	4	0	0
6	5	(England)	CB	Alfie Mawson	2	0	1	0	0	0	0	0	0	2	0	1
6	10	(England)	SS	Jamie Paterson	3	0	0	0	0	0	0	0	0	3	0	0
6	23	(England)	CB	Taylor Moore	3	0	0	0	0	0	0	0	0	3	0	0
6	26	(England)	CB	Zak Vyner	3	0	0	0	0	0	0	0	0	3	0	0
10	4	(Hungary)	DM	Ádám Nagy	1	0	0	1	0	0	0	0	0	2	0	0
10	6	(England)	CB	Nathan Baker	2	0	0	0	0	0	0	0	0	2	0	0
10	7	(England)	CF	Chris Martin	2	0	0	0	0	0	0	0	0	2	0	0
10	18	(England)	CF	Antoine Semenyo	2	0	0	0	0	0	0	0	0	2	0	0
10	25	(England)	LM	Tommy Rowe	2	0	0	0	0	0	0	0	0	2	0	0
10	30	(England)	DM	Tyreeq Bakinson	2	0	0	0	0	0	0	0	0	2	0	0
16	8	(England)	CM	Liam Walsh	1	0	0	0	0	0	0	0	0	1	0	0
16	29	(England)	RB	Danny Simpson	1	0	0	0	0	0	0	0	0	1	0	0
16	34	(England)	DM	Ryley Towler	1	0	0	0	0	0	0	0	0	1	0	0
16	40	(England)	CF	Louis Britton	1	0	0	0	0	0	0	0	0	1	0	0
16	42	(France)	CM	Han-Noah Massengo	1	0	0	0	0	0	0	0	0	1	0	0
Total					49	1	2	1	0	0	1	0	0	51	1	2

== Transfers ==
=== Transfers in ===
Date	Position	Nationality	Name	From	Fee	Ref.
20 August 2020	CM	(England)	Joe Williams	(England) Wigan Athletic	£1,200,000	
3 September 2020	CF	(Scotland)	Chris Martin	(England) Derby County	Free transfer	
7 September 2020	CM	(Northern Ireland)	Chris Brunt	(England) West Bromwich Albion	Free transfer	
26 March 2021	RB	(England)	Danny Simpson	(England) Huddersfield Town	Free transfer	

=== Loans in ===
Date from	Position	Nationality	Name	From	Date until	Ref.
6 September 2020	CB	(England)	Alfie Mawson	(England) Fulham	30 June 2021	
7 September 2020	RB	(England)	Steven Sessegnon	(England) Fulham	30 June 2021	

=== Loans out ===
Date from	Position	Nationality	Name	To	Date until	Ref.
7 August 2020	CB	(England)	Robbie Cundy	(England) Cambridge United	25 January 2021	
7 August 2020	LB	(England)	George Nurse	(England) Walsall	End of season	
22 August 2020	RW	(Wales)	Marley Watkins	(Scotland) Aberdeen	1 January 2021	
28 August 2020	CF	(The Gambia)	Saikou Janneh	(Wales) Newport County	End of season	
28 August 2020	LM	(England)	Jonny Smith	(England) Swindon Town	29 January 2021	
1 September 2020	LB	(England)	Cameron Pring	(England) Portsmouth	3 January 2021	
4 September 2020	GK	(England)	Will Buse	(England) Dorchester Town	End of season	
5 September 2020	RW	(England)	Owura Edwards	(England) Grimsby Town	End of season	
18 September 2020	FW	(England)	Tommy Conway	(England) Bath City		
18 September 2020	CF	(Wales)	Sam Pearson	(England) Weymouth	2 October 2020	
18 September 2020	DF	(England)	James Taylor	(England) Bath City		
18 September 2020	DF	(England)	Bradley Webb	(Wales) Newport County	End of season	
24 September 2020	RW	(England)	Hakeeb Adelakun	(England) Hull City	End of season	
30 September 2020	DM	(England)	James Morton	(England) Grimsby Town	End of season	
3 October 2020	FW	(England)	Louis Britton	(England) Torquay United	27 October 2020	
9 October 2020	CF	(England)	Freddie Hinds	(England) Bath City	January 2021	
16 October 2020	AM	(England)	Kasey Palmer	(Wales) Swansea City	5 January 2021	
31 October 2020	FW	(England)	Louis Britton	(England) Stockport County	January 2021	
27 November 2020	DF	(England)	Tom Harrison	(England) Chippenham Town	31 December 2020	
15 January 2021	MF	(England)	Josh Owers	(England) Bath City	End of season	
25 January 2021	CB	(England)	Robbie Cundy	(England) Gillingham	End of season	
1 February 2021	DM	(England)	James Morton	(England) Gillingham	End of season	
12 February 2021	GK	(England)	Joe Wollacott	(England) Swindon Town	19 February 2021	

=== Transfers out ===
Date	Position	Nationality	Name	To	Fee	Ref.
1 July 2020	MF	(England)	Will Gould	Unattached	Released	
1 July 2020	MF	(England)	Jago Lott	(United States) UMBC Retrievers	Released	
1 July 2020	RB	(Wales)	Jamie Taylor	Unattached	Released	
1 July 2020	CB	(Australia)	Bailey Wright	(England) Sunderland	Released	
31 July 2020	CF	(England)	Matty Taylor	(England) Oxford United	Free Transfer	
9 August 2020	DM	(England)	Korey Smith	(Wales) Swansea City	Released	
11 August 2020	CF	(Northern Ireland)	Rory Holden	(England) Walsall	Undisclosed	
15 August 2020	MF	(Wales)	Connor Lemonheigh-Evans	(England) Torquay United	Free transfer	
8 September 2020	AM	(England)	Sammie Szmodics	(England) Peterborough United	Undisclosed	
2 October 2020	LM	(Sweden)	Niclas Eliasson	(France) Nîmes Olympique	Undisclosed	
15 October 2020	CM	(Wales)	Joe Morrell	(England) Luton Town	Undisclosed	
29 January 2021	LM	(England)	Jonny Smith	(England) Burton Albion	Undisclosed	

== Pre-season and friendlies ==
Win Draw Loss Fixtures

Bristol City F.C. confirmed on 13 August 2020 that they would play at least 2 Friendlies in the Delayed Pre-season in 2020, both behind closed doors both at Ashton Gate Stadium, against Cheltenham Town and Portsmouth.The latter cancelled the friendly after agreeing to move their Carabao cup fixture forward a week. Swindon, Weston-Super-Mare & 2 60 Min games against Villa were booked

21 August 2020 Friendly	Bristol City	4–0	Cheltenham Town	Bristol
12:00 BST	Wells 8', 44', 45'; Weimann 87'	Report		Stadium: Ashton Gate; Attendance: 0
Note: Match behind closed doors due to COVID-19

29 August 2020 Friendly	Bristol City	CANCELLED	Portsmouth	Bristol
TBC BST				Stadium: Ashton Gate; Attendance: 0
Note: Match behind closed doors due to COVID-19, This match was cancelled after Portsmouth agreed to move their Carabao Cup Fixture against Stevenage forward a week, causing a fixture clash

26 August 2020 Friendly	Weston-super-Mare	2–1	Bristol City XI	Weston-super-Mare
19:30 BST		Report		Stadium: Optima Stadium
Note: Match Limited to 300 Capacity due to COVID-19

26 August 2020 Friendly	Bristol City	1–0	Aston Villa	The Vale Resort
TBC BST	Paterson	Report
Note: 60 MINS ONLY

26 August 2020 Friendly	Aston Villa	1–0	Bristol City	The Vale Resort
TBC BST	Samatta	Report
Note: 60 MINS ONLY

29 August 2020 Friendly	Bristol City	v	Swindon Town	Bristol
TBA BST		Report		Stadium: Ashton Gate; Attendance: 0
Note: Match behind closed doors due to COVID-19

== Competitions ==
=== Overview ===
Competition	First match	Last match	Starting round	Record							
Competition	First match	Last match	Starting round	Pld	W	D	L	GF	GA	GD	Win %
EFL Championship	11 September 2020	8 May 2021	Matchday 1	46	15	6	25	46	68	−22	32.61
FA Cup	10 January 2021	10 February 2021	Third round	3	2	0	1	5	2	+3	66.67
EFL Cup	5 September 2020	24 September 2020	First round	3	2	0	1	6	3	+3	66.67
Total				52	19	6	27	57	73	−16	36.54

Last updated: 8 May 2021
Source: Competitions

=== EFL Championship ===
==== League table ====
Pos	Team	Pld	W	D	L	GF	GA	GD	Pts	Promotion, qualification or relegation
16	Coventry City	46	14	13	19	49	61	−12	55	
17	Nottingham Forest	46	12	16	18	37	45	−8	52	
18	Birmingham City	46	13	13	20	37	61	−24	52	
19	Bristol City	46	15	6	25	46	68	−22	51	
20	Huddersfield Town	46	12	13	21	50	71	−21	49	
21	Derby County	46	11	11	24	36	58	−22	44	
22	Wycombe Wanderers (R)	46	11	10	25	39	69	−30	43	Relegation to EFL League One

Source: EFL Official Website
Rules for classification: 1) Points; 2) Goal difference; 3) Number of goals scored; 4) Head-to-head results; 5) Wins; 6) Away goals; 7) Penalty points (sec 9.5); 8) 12-point sending off offences
(R) Relegated

==== Results summary ====
Overall								Home						Away					
Pld	W	D	L	GF	GA	GD	Pts	W	D	L	GF	GA	GD	W	D	L	GF	GA	GD
46	15	6	25	46	68	−22	51	7	3	13	18	30	−12	8	3	12	28	38	−10

Last updated: 8 May 2021.

==== Results by matchday ====
Matchday	1	2	3	4	5	6	7	8	9	10	11	12	13	14	15	16	17	18	19	20	21	22	23	24	25	26	27	28	29	30	31	32	33	34	35	36	37	38	39	40	41	42	43	44	45	46
Ground	H	A	H	A	A	H	H	A	H	A	A	H	H	A	A	H	H	A	H	A	H	A	H	A	H	A	A	H	A	H	H	A	A	H	H	A	A	H	H	A	H	A	A	H	A	H
Result	W	W	W	W	D	L	D	L	L	W	W	W	D	L	W	L	W	L	L	L	W	L	W	L	W	L	L	L	L	L	L	W	W	L	L	W	D	L	L	L	D	D	L	L	L	L
Position	4	2	2	1	1	2	2	6	10	7	5	3	3	6	5	8	6	7	9	9	9	10	9	9	8	9	9	10	13	14	15	12	11	12	12	12	13	14	14	14	14	14	16	18	19	19

Updated to match(es) played on 8 May 2021. Source:
A = Away; H = Home; W = Win; D = Draw; L = Loss

==== Matches ====
The 2020–21 season fixtures were released on 21 August.

12 September 2020 1	Bristol City	2–1	Coventry City	Ashton Gate
15:00 BST	Paterson 1'; Rowe (yellow card) 14'; Vyner (yellow card) 52'; Kalas 82'	Report	Hamer (yellow card) 12'; Godden 33'	Stadium: Ashton Gate Stadium; Attendance: 0 Referee: John Brooks

20 September 2020 2	Stoke City	0–2	Bristol City	Stoke-on-Trent
14:00 BST	Powell (yellow card) 61'	Report	Paterson (yellow card) 10'; Wells 45+2'; Weimann 89'	Stadium: Bet365 Stadium; Attendance: 0 Referee: Oliver Langford

27 September 2020 3	Bristol City	2–0	Sheffield Wednesday	Ashton Gate
14:00 BST	Bakinson (yellow card) 34'; Paterson (yellow card) 44' (goal) 90+3'; Rowe 60'	Report	Harris (yellow card) 71'	Stadium: Ashton Gate Stadium; Attendance: 0 Referee: Tony Harrington

3 October 2020 4	Nottingham Forest	1–2	Bristol City	West Bridgford
15:00 BST	Freeman 35'	Report	Weimann 12'; Wells 22'; Hunt (yellow card) 39'; Mawson (yellow card) 43'	Stadium: City Ground; Attendance: 0 Referee: Keith Stroud

17 October 2020 5	Barnsley	2–2	Bristol City	Barnsley
15:00 BST	Helik 2' (yellow card) 88'; Andersen (yellow card) 81'; Woodrow 90+11' (pen.)	Report	Hunt 47'; Bakinson 51'	Stadium: Oakwell; Attendance: 0 Referee: Leigh Doughty

20 October 2020 6	Bristol City	0–1	Middlesbrough	Ashton Gate
19:45 BST		Report	Fry (yellow card) 67'; Saville 73'; Bettinelli (yellow card) 90+2'	Stadium: Ashton Gate Stadium; Attendance: 0 Referee: Tim Robinson

24 October 2020 7	Bristol City	1–1	Swansea City	Ashton Gate
15:00 BST	Wells 83' (pen.) (yellow card) 89'	Report	Smith (yellow card) 32'; Lowe 51'; Roberts (yellow card) 80'; Fulton (yellow card) 81'; Grimes (yellow card) 83'; Ayew (yellow card) 87'	Stadium: Ashton Gate Stadium; Attendance: 0 Referee: Oliver Langford

28 October 2020 8	Bournemouth	1–0	Bristol City	Kings Park
19:45 GMT	Danjuma 81'	Report		Stadium: Vitality Stadium; Attendance: 0 Referee: Steve Martin

31 October 2020 9	Bristol City	1–3	Norwich City	Ashton Gate
12:30 GMT	Hunt 15'; Wells (penalty missed) 75'	Report	Pukki 6', 14'; Buendía 45+1'; Sørensen (yellow card) 60'; Gibson (yellow card) 66'; Krul (yellow card) 73'; Rupp (yellow card) 77'	Stadium: Ashton Gate Stadium; Attendance: 0 Referee: Jarred Gillett

3 November 2020 10	Huddersfield Town	1–2	Bristol City	Huddersfield
19:00 GMT	Koroma 43'; Sarr (yellow card) 72'; Hamer (yellow card) 75'; Hogg (yellow card) 90+1'	Report	Dasilva 77'; Paterson 83'	Stadium: John Smith's Stadium; Attendance: 0 Referee: Peter Bankes

6 November 2020 11	Cardiff City	0–1	Bristol City	Cardiff
18:00 GMT	Pack (yellow card) 51'	Report	Martin 2' (yellow card) 45+1'	Stadium: Cardiff City Stadium; Attendance: 0 Referee: David Webb

21 November 2020 12	Bristol City	1–0	Derby County	Ashton Gate
15:00 GMT	Diédhiou 78'	Report		Stadium: Ashton Gate Stadium; Attendance: 0 Referee: Keith Stroud

25 November 2020 13	Bristol City	0–0	Watford	Ashton Gate
19:45 GMT		Report		Stadium: Ashton Gate Stadium; Attendance: 0 Referee: Dean Whitestone

28 November 2020 14	Reading	3–1	Bristol City	Reading
12:30 GMT	Ejaria 54'; Méïté 76'; João 90+2'	Report	Moore (yellow card) 65'; Martin (yellow card) 70'; Wells 73'	Stadium: Madejski Stadium; Attendance: 0 Referee: Jeremy Simpson

1 December 2020 15	Queens Park Rangers	1–2	Bristol City	Queen's Park, London
17:45 GMT	Dickie 12'; Dickie (yellow card) 27'; Carroll (yellow card) 69'	Report	Wells (yellow card) 57'; Wells 40'; Nagy 50'	Stadium: Kiyan Prince Foundation Stadium; Attendance: 0 Referee: James Linington

5 December 2020 16	Bristol City	0–1	Birmingham City	Ashton Gate
15:00 GMT		Report	Dean 80'	Stadium: Ashton Gate Stadium; Attendance: 0 Referee: John Brooks

9 December 2020 17	Bristol City	1–0	Blackburn Rovers	Ashton Gate
19:45 GMT	Wells (yellow card) 38'; Diédhiou 82'	Report		Stadium: Ashton Gate Stadium; Referee: Steve Martin

12 December 2020 18	Rotherham United	2–0	Bristol City	Rotherham
15:00 GMT	Crooks 4'; Lindsay (yellow card) 19'; Smith 41'; Olosunde (yellow card) 45+2'	Report	Rowe (yellow card) 9'	Stadium: New York Stadium; Attendance: 0 Referee: Leigh Doughty

15 December 2020 19	Bristol City	0–2	Millwall	Bristol
19:45 GMT	Diédhiou (yellow card) 73' (yellow-red card) 79'; Massengo (yellow card) 85'	Report	Bradshaw 17'; Bennett 68'	Stadium: Ashton Gate; Attendance: 0 Referee: David Webb

18 December 2020 20	Preston North End	1–0	Bristol City	Preston
20:00 GMT	Johnson 21' (pen.); Fisher (yellow card) 51'	Report		Stadium: Deepdale; Attendance: 0 Referee: Geoff Eltringham

26 December 2020 21	Bristol City	2–1	Wycombe Wanderers	Bristol
15:00 GMT	Martin 23'; Diédhiou 87'	Report	McCleary 68'; Jacobson (yellow card) 89'; Adeniran (yellow card) 90+3'	Stadium: Ashton Gate; Attendance: 0 Referee: Keith Stroud

29 December 2020 22	Luton Town	2–1	Bristol City	Luton
19:45 GMT	Rea 17'; Tunnicliffe (yellow card) 33'; Dewsbury-Hall 68'	Report	Bradley 61' (o.g.); Semenyo (yellow card) 73'	Stadium: Kenilworth Road; Attendance: 0 Referee: Gavin Ward

16 January 2021 23	Bristol City	2–0	Preston North End	Bristol
15:00 GMT	Diédhiou 8'; Palmer (yellow card) 61'; Vyner 77'	Report	Fisher (yellow card) 83'	Stadium: Ashton Gate; Attendance: 0 Referee: Dean Whitestone

20 January 2021 24	Norwich City	2–0	Bristol City	Norwich
18:00 GMT	Hugill 36', 76'; Cantwell (yellow card) 51'	Report	Palmer (yellow card) 51'	Stadium: Carrow Road; Attendance: 0 Referee: James Linington

26 January 2021 25	Bristol City	2–1	Huddersfield Town	Bristol
19:00 GMT	Diédhiou (yellow card) 5', (goal) 23', 26'; Vyner (yellow card) 55'; Nagy (yellow card) 90+3'	Report	Bacuna 59', (yellow card) 90+3'; Pipa (yellow card) 74'	Stadium: Ashton Gate; Attendance: 0 Referee: Steve Martin

30 January 2021 26	Derby County	1–0	Bristol City	Derby
15:00 GMT	Kazim-Richards 4'; Waghorn (yellow card) 85'	Report	Vyner (yellow card) 54'	Stadium: Pride Park Stadium; Attendance: 0 Referee: Darren England

3 February 2021 27	Brentford	3–2	Bristol City	Brentford
19:45 GMT	Canós 27'; Toney 50'; Ghoddos 53'	Report	Vyner 3'; Wells 90'	Stadium: Brentford Community Stadium; Attendance: 0 Referee: Tim Robinson

6 February 2021 28	Bristol City	0–2	Cardiff City	Bristol
15:00 GMT	Lansbury (yellow card) 45+8'; Mawson (yellow card) 45+11'; Hunt (yellow card) 71'	Report	Nelson 18', (yellow card) 90+2'; Moore 25'; Phillips (yellow card) 75'	Stadium: Ashton Gate; Attendance: 0 Referee: Jarred Gillett

13 February 2021 29	Watford	6–0	Bristol City	Watford
15:00 GMT	Sema 2', 35'; Sarr 15', 55'; Chalobah (yellow card) 17'; Hughes 30'; Pedro (yellow card) 81'; Zinckernagel 90'	Report	Moore (yellow card) 7'; Diédhiou (yellow card) 47'; Palmer (yellow card) 81'	Stadium: Vicarage Road; Attendance: 0 Referee: John Brooks

16 February 2021 30	Bristol City	0–2	Reading	Bristol
19:45 GMT	Hunt (yellow card) 20'; Lansbury (yellow card) 67'; Moore (yellow card) 76'; Bakinson (yellow card) 90+3'	Report	Richards (yellow card) 37'; João 42'; Morrison 45'; Ejaria (yellow card) 69'; Olise (yellow card) 70'	Stadium: Ashton Gate; Attendance: 0 Referee: Oliver Langford

20 February 2021 31	Bristol City	0–1	Barnsley	Bristol
15:00 GMT	Hunt (yellow card) 4'	Report	Morris 67'; Mowatt (yellow card) 79'; Collins (yellow card) 90+3'	Stadium: Ashton Gate; Attendance: 0 Referee: James Linington

23 February 2021 32	Middlesbrough	1–3	Bristol City	Middlesbrough
19:00 GMT	Bola (yellow card) 63'; Fry 80'	Report	Diédhiou 21', 33'; Wells 37'; Palmer (yellow card) 61'; Hunt (yellow card) 90+1'	Stadium: Riverside Stadium; Attendance: 0 Referee: Tim Robinson

27 February 2021 33	Swansea City	1–3	Bristol City	Swansea
15:00 GMT	Ayew 55' (pen.); Bidwell (yellow card) 61'	Report	Towler (yellow card) 25'; Wells 66'; Palmer 80'; Semenyo 90+7', (yellow card) 90+10'	Stadium: The Liberty Stadium; Attendance: 0 Referee: Keith Stroud

3 March 2021 34	Bristol City	1–2	Bournemouth	Bristol
19:45 GMT	Bakinson 38'	Report	Bentley 45+1' (o.g.); Kelly (yellow card) 70'; Carter-Vickers 88'	Stadium: Ashton Gate; Attendance: 0 Referee: Simon Hooper

6 March 2021 35	Bristol City	0–2	Queens Park Rangers	Bristol
15:00 GMT	Lansbury (yellow card) 84'; Diédhiou (yellow card) 88'	Report	Chair 11'; Dickie 22', (yellow card) 74'; Kakay (yellow card) 71'; Ball (yellow card) 76'	Stadium: Ashton Gate; Attendance: 0 Referee: Tony Harrington

13 March 2021 36	Birmingham City	0–3	Bristol City	Bordesley
15:00 GMT	Sánchez (yellow card) 45+1'; Šunjić (yellow card) 48'; Roberts (yellow card) 90+1'	Report	Palmer 35'; Wells (yellow card) 49'; Semenyo 62'; Lansbury (yellow card) 66'; O'Dowda 76'	Stadium: St Andrew's; Attendance: 0 Referee: Jarred Gillett

17 March 2021 37	Blackburn Rovers	0–0	Bristol City	Blackburn
19:45 GMT		Report	Palmer (yellow card) 74'	Stadium: Ewood Park; Attendance: 0 Referee: Craig Hicks

20 March 2021 38	Bristol City	0–2	Rotherham United	Bristol
15:00 GMT	Walsh (yellow card) 85'	Report	Smith 44'; Wood 74'; Hirst (yellow card) 90+3'	Stadium: Ashton Gate; Attendance: 0 Referee: Matt Donohue

2 April 2021 39	Bristol City	0–2	Stoke City	Bristol
15:00 BST	Lansbury (yellow card) 14'	Report	Powell 25'; Brown (yellow card) 55'; Fletcher 62'	Stadium: Ashton Gate Stadium; Attendance: 0 Referee: Michael Salisbury

5 April 2021 40	Coventry City	3–1	Bristol City	Birmingham
15:00 BST	Østigård 9'; Godden 63' (pen.); Walker (yellow card) 67'; Kelly (yellow card) 69'; Gyökeres 87'	Report	Diédhiou (yellow card) 31'; Palmer (yellow card) 69'; Wells 79'	Stadium: St Andrew's; Attendance: 0 Referee: Leigh Doughty

10 April 2021 41	Bristol City	0–0	Nottingham Forest	Bristol
15:00 BST		Report	McKenna (yellow card) 85'	Stadium: Ashton Gate; Attendance: 0 Referee: Steve Martin

17 April 2021 42	Sheffield Wednesday	1–1	Bristol City	Owlerton
12:30 BST	Börner 4'; Hutchinson (yellow card) 8'; Bannan (penalty missed) 22'	Report	Lansbury (red card) 20'; Bakinson 87'	Stadium: Hillsborough; Attendance: 0 Referee: Tony Harrington

21 April 2021 43	Wycombe Wanderers	2–1	Bristol City	High Wycombe
19:00 BST	Ikpeazu 65'; Pattison (yellow card) 81'; Akinfenwa 90+2' (pen.)	Report	Bakinson 28'	Stadium: Adams Park; Attendance: 0 Referee: Dean Whitestone

25 April 2021 44	Bristol City	2–3	Luton Town	Ashton Gate
13:00 BST	Wells 31'; Nagy 38'	Report	Collins 59'; Adebayo 68'; Cornick 74'	Stadium: Ashton Gate Stadium; Attendance: 0 Referee: John Busby

1 May 2021 45	Millwall	4–1	Bristol City	Bermondsey
15:00 BST	Wallace 5'; Malone 31'; Mitchell (yellow card) 45', (goal) 52'; Bradshaw 58'; McNamara (yellow card) 68'	Report	Conway 16'; Baker (yellow card) 73'	Stadium: The Den; Attendance: 0 Referee: Josh Smith

8 May 2021 46	Bristol City	1–3	Brentford	Ashton Gate
12:30 BST	Palmer (yellow card) 28'; Simpson (yellow card) 54'; Baker (yellow card) 60'; Britton (yellow card) 77', (goal) 87'	Report	Toney (yellow card) 30', (goal) 57'; Mbeumo 78'; Canós 83'	Stadium: Ashton Gate Stadium; Attendance: 0 Referee: James Linington

=== FA Cup ===
The third round draw was made on 30 November, with Premier League and EFL Championship clubs all entering the competition. The draw for the fourth and fifth round were made on 11 January, conducted by Peter Crouch.

10 January 2021 Third round	Bristol City	2–1	Portsmouth	Bristol
13:30 GMT	Nagy (yellow card) 5'; Diédhiou 19'; Martin 83'	Report	Nicolaisen (yellow card) 32'; Johnson 45+1'; Naylor (yellow card) 82'	Stadium: Ashton Gate; Attendance: 0 Referee: Jarred Gillett

23 January 2021 Fourth round	Millwall	0–3	Bristol City	Bermondsey
15:00 GMT		Report	Diédhiou 32' (pen.); Wells 58'; Semenyo 72'	Stadium: The Den; Attendance: 0 Referee: Tony Harrington

10 February 2021 Fifth round	Sheffield United	1–0	Bristol City	Sheffield
19:30 GMT	Sharp 66' (pen.)	Report	Mawson (red card) 65'	Stadium: Bramall Lane; Attendance: 0 Referee: Robert Jones

=== EFL Cup ===
The first round draw was made on 18 August, live on Sky Sports, by Paul Merson. The draw for both the second and third round were confirmed on 6 September, live on Sky Sports by Phil Babb.

5 September 2020 First round	Bristol City	2–0	Exeter City	Ashton Gate
14:00 BST	Paterson 35'; Semenyo 83'; Hunt (yellow card) 90+1'	Report	Sparkes (yellow card) 90'	Stadium: Ashton Gate Stadium; Attendance: 0 Referee: Chris Sarginson

16 September 2020 Second round	Bristol City	4–0	Northampton Town	Ashton Gate
19:45 BST	Martin 43'; Palmer 48', 88'; Semenyo 82'	Report	Missilou (yellow card) 87'	Stadium: Ashton Gate Stadium; Attendance: 0 Referee: Tom Nield

24 September 2020 Third round	Bristol City	0–3	Aston Villa	Ashton Gate
19:00 BST		Report	El Ghazi 11'; Traoré 14'; Watkins 73'	Stadium: Ashton Gate Stadium; Attendance: 0 Referee: James Linington
