= Vítek =

Vítek (feminine: Vítková) is a Czech surname and rarely a masculine given name. It is a diminutive of the Czech given name Vít, but it might be derived directly from the Latin name Vitus, meaning 'lively'. Notable people with the name include:

== Surname ==
- Dárius Vitek (born 1999), Hungarian Greco-Roman wrestler
- Jack Vitek, American educator
- Jaroslav Vítek (1915–1966), Czech athlete
- Jerrold Vitek, American neurologist
- John Vitek (1907–1989), American politician
- Miroslav Vítek (1909–1976), Czech athlete
- Olga Vitek (born 1970s), American biostatistician and computer scientist
- Pavel Vítek (born 1962), Czech singer and actor
- Petra Vítková (born 1979), Czech handballer
- Radek Vítek (born 2003), Czech footballer
- Rostislav Vítek (born 1976), Czech swimmer
- Veronika Vítková (born 1988), Czech biathlete
- Zdeněk Vítek (born 1977), Czech biathlete

== Given name ==
- Vítek Vaněček (born 1996), Czech ice hockey player

== See also ==
- Vitek (disambiguation)
- 30253 Vítek, main-belt asteroid
