= 2025–26 Bristol City F.C. season =

English football club season

Bristol City
2025–26 season
- Owner: Steve Lansdown
- Chairman: Jon Lansdown
- Head coach: Gerhard Struber (until 27 March); Roy Hodgson (interim, from 27 March)
- Stadium: Ashton Gate
- Championship: 12th
- FA Cup: Fourth round
- EFL Cup: Second round
- Top goalscorer: League: Scott Twine (11); All: Emil Riis Jakobsen (12)
- Average home league attendance: 23,278

The 2025–26 season was the 128th season in the history of Bristol City Football Club, and the club's eleventh consecutive season in the Championship. In addition to the domestic league, the club also participated in the FA Cup and the EFL Cup.

Prior to the season starting, the club appointed Gerhard Struber as the new head coach on a three-year contract. Later in the month, the club announced the appointment of Bernd Eibler as assistant coach. On 27 March 2026, Bristol City announced the departure of Gerhard Struber and Bernd Eibler and they were replaced by former England national team and Crystal Palace manager Roy Hodgson as the interim manager until the conclusion of the season.

== Transfers and contracts ==
=== In ===
Date	Pos	Player	Transferred from	Fee	Ref.
1 July 2025	FW	(Japan) Yū Hirakawa	(Japan) Machida Zelvia	Undisclosed	
1 July 2025	FW	(Denmark) Emil Riis Jakobsen	(England) Preston North End	Free	
1 July 2025	GK	(England) Joe Lumley	(England) Southampton	Free	
1 July 2025	MF	(England) Adam Randell	(England) Plymouth Argyle	Undisclosed	
2 January 2026	MF	(Egypt) Sam Morsy	Kuwait SC	Free	
2 January 2026	FW	(England) Ranel Young	(Serbia) Ušće Novi Beograd	Free	
29 January 2026	DF	(England) Seb Naylor	(England) Manchester City	Undisclosed	
2 February 2026	MF	(Slovenia) Tomi Horvat	(Austria) Sturm Graz	Undisclosed	
2 February 2026	DF	(Sweden) Noah Eile	(United States) New York Red Bulls	Undisclosed	
11 February 2026	FW	(Republic of Ireland) Rhys Knight	(Republic of Ireland) Bray Wanderers	Undisclosed	

=== Out ===
Date	Pos	Player	Transferred to	Fee	Ref.
30 June 2025	FW	(England) Tim Ap Sion	(Wales) Cardiff Metropolitan University	Free (Note: Following his release, Ap Sion joined Cardiff Met as a free agent on 15 January.)	
30 June 2025	GK	(France) Stefan Bajic	(France) Strasbourg	Free (Note: Following his release, Bajic joined Strasbourg as a free agent on 16 August.)	
30 June 2025	MF	(England) Ayman Benarous	(England) Plymouth Argyle	Free (Note: Following his release, Benarous joined Plymouth Argyle as a free agent on 8 July.)	
30 June 2025	MF	(England) Kai Churchley	(Wales) Merthyr Town	Free (Note: Following his release, Churchley joined Merthyr Town as a free agent on 1 July.)	
30 June 2025	DF	(Scotland) Kal Naismith	(England) Luton Town	Free (Note: Following his release, Naismith joined Luton Town as a free agent on 1 July.)	
30 June 2025	MF	(England) Marley Rose	(England) Taunton Town	Free (Note: Following his release, Rose joined Taunton Town as a free agent on 25 August.)	
30 June 2025	DF	(England) Romani Rowe	(England) Corsham Town	Free (Note: Following his release, Rowe joined Corsham Town as a free agent on 26 July.)	
30 June 2025	FW	(Bermuda) Nahki Wells	(England) Luton Town	Free (Note: Following his release, Wells joined Luton Town as a free agent on 10 July.)	
30 June 2025	DF	(Wales) Callum Wood	(England) Weston-super-Mare	Free (Note: Following his release, Wells joined Weston-super-Mare as a free agent on 1 May.)	
1 July 2025	MF	(England) Taylor Gardner-Hickman	(England) Birmingham City	£1,500,000	
1 July 2025	FW	(England) Seb Palmer-Houlden	(England) Gillingham	Undisclosed	
23 July 2025	MF	(England) Marcus McGuane	(England) Huddersfield Town	Undisclosed	
6 January 2026	DF	(Germany) Raphael Araoye	(Germany) SC Verl	Undisclosed	
21 January 2026	DF	(England) Haydon Roberts	(England) Reading	Undisclosed	
22 January 2026	GK	(Republic of Ireland) Max O'Leary	(England) West Bromwich Albion	Undisclosed	
23 January 2026	MF	(Albania) Anis Mehmeti	(England) Ipswich Town	£3,000,000 (Note: Plus additional add on fees)	
1 February 2026	DF	(Kenya) Zak Vyner	(Wales) Wrexham	£1,500,000	
2 February 2026	FW	(France) Fally Mayulu	(Portugal) Arouca	Undisclosed	
13 February 2026	MF	(England) Jed Meerholz	(England) Aldershot Town	Free Transfer	

=== Loaned in ===
Date	Pos	Player	Loaned from	Until	Ref.
28 July 2025	GK	(Czech Republic) Radek Vítek	(England) Manchester United	31 May 2026	
31 August 2025	DF	(Brazil) Neto Borges	(England) Middlesbrough	31 May 2026	
9 January 2026	MF	(England) George Earthy	(England) West Ham United	31 May 2026	
29 January 2026	FW	(Suriname) Delano Burgzorg	(England) Middlesbrough	31 May 2026	

=== Loaned out ===
Date	Pos.	Player	Loaned to	Until	Ref.
1 July 2025	MF	(England) Jed Meerholz	(England) Aldershot Town	17 October 2025 (Note: On 17 October, Meerholz was recalled back from his half-season loan at Aldershot)	
4 July 2025	GK	(England) Ben Clark	(England) Weymouth	31 May 2026	
7 July 2025	DF	(England) Taine Anderson	(England) Cheltenham Town	7 January 2026 (Note: On 7 January, Anderson's season-long loan at Cheltenham was terminated due to sustaining a hamstring injury)	
6 August 2025	FW	(England) Luke Skinner	(England) Weston-super-Mare	1 October 2025 (Note: On 1 October, Skinner was recalled back from his half-season loan at Weston-super-Mare)	
1 September 2025	FW	(England) Sam Bell	(England) Wycombe Wanderers	1 January 2026 (Note: On 1 January, Bell was recalled back from his loan at Wycombe)	
1 September 2025	DF	(Canada) Jamie Knight-Lebel	(England) Swindon Town	31 May 2026	
1 September 2025	MF	(Republic of Ireland) Adam Murphy	(England) Swindon Town	9 January 2026 (Note: On 9 January, Murphy was recalled back from his season-long loan at Swindon Town)	
2 September 2025	GK	(England) Isaac Finch	(England) Bath City	30 September 2025	
4 October 2025	FW	(England) Luke Skinner	(England) Eastleigh	15 November 2025 (Note: On 15 November, Skinner was recalled back from his loan at Eastleigh)	
21 October 2025	GK	(England) Joe Lumley	(England) Sheffield Wednesday	28 October 2025	
18 November 2025	MF	(England) Tom Chaplin	(England) Taunton Town	16 December 2025	
17 December 2025	FW	(England) Billy Phillips	(England) Chippenham Town	15 January 2026	
6 January 2026	FW	(England) Josh Stokes	(England) Stockport County	31 May 2026	
7 January 2026	FW	(England) Olly Thomas	(Scotland) Dunfermline Athletic	31 May 2026	
9 January 2026	MF	(Wales) Ruebin Sheppard	(England) Bath City	7 February 2026	
13 January 2026	MF	(England) Elijah Morrison	(England) Forest Green Rovers	31 May 2026	
13 January 2026	GK	(England) Jack Witchard	(England) Bristol Manor Farm	31 May 2026	
17 January 2026	FW	(England) Harry Cornick	(England) Stevenage	31 May 2026	
19 January 2026	FW	(Japan) Yū Hirakawa	(England) Hull City	31 May 2026	
12 February 2026	DF	(Wales) Zack Ali	(England) Gloucester City	31 May 2026	
13 February 2026	GK	(England) Isaac Finch	(England) Taunton Town		
20 February 2026	MF	(England) Tom Chaplin	(England) Hungerford Town		
20 February 2026	FW	(England) Luke Skinner	(England) Bath City	31 May 2026	
21 February 2026	MF	(England) Leo Pecover	(England) Weston-super-Mare	31 May 2026	
10 March 2026	GK	(Jamaica) Joe Duncan	(England) Farnborough	31 May 2026	
26 March 2026	FW	(Italy) Ephraim Yeboah	(England) Carlisle United	31 May 2026	

=== New Contracts ===
Date	Pos	Player	Contracted until	Ref.
First team
18 June 2025	FW	(England) Josh Stokes	30 June 2028	
23 June 2025	DF	(England) Rob Atkinson	30 June 2028	
1 July 2025	GK	(Wales) Lewis Thomas	30 June 2027	
15 October 2025	DF	(England) Robert Dickie	30 June 2028	
9 April 2026	DF	(Canada) Jamie Knight-Lebel	30 June 2029	
Academy
10 June 2025	DF	(England) Josh Campbell-Slowey	30 June 2028	
24 June 2025	FW	(England) Leo Pecover	Undisclosed (Note: First professional contract)	
25 June 2025	GK	(Jamaica) Joe Duncan	30 June 2027	
28 July 2025	FW	(England) Olly Thomas	30 June 2026	
29 July 2025	DF	(Germany) Raphael Araoye	30 June 2026	
30 July 2025	DF	(England) Taine Anderson	30 June 2028	
8 October 2025	GK	(England) Freddie Godden	30 June 2026	
9 October 2025	MF	(England) Louie Derrick	30 June 2028	
7 January 2026	FW	(England) Olly Thomas	30 June 2028	
22 January 2026	MF	(England) Harry Hogg	Undisclosed	
22 January 2026	DF	(England) Marley Thelwell	Undisclosed	
3 February 2026	MF	(Italy) Daniel Ezendu	Undisclosed	
30 April 2026	FW	(England) Victor Akinbo	Undisclosed	
30 April 2026	DF	(Wales) Tomos Gibbs	Undisclosed	
30 April 2026	FW	(England) Excellent Ikpeama	Undisclosed	

== Pre-season and friendlies ==
On 4 June, Bristol City announced their first pre-season fixture against Milton Keynes Dons. Six days later, three more fixtures were confirmed against Bournemouth, Newport County and Cheltenham Town. A fifth fixture was later added, against Plymouth Argyle. On 10 July, a home friendly against Real Valladolid was announced.

Win Draw Loss Fixtures

12 July 2025 Friendly	Farense	1–3	Bristol City	TBA, Portugal
16:00 WEST		Report	Sykes; Hirakawa (x2)	Stadium: TBA; Attendance: 0 (Behind-closed-doors)

19 July 2025 Friendly	Bournemouth	1-4	Bristol City	Wimborne
13:00 BST	Tavernier; Truffert; Semenyo; Evanilson; Ouattara	Report	Yeboah; McCrorie	Stadium: Canford Magna Training Ground; Attendance: 0 (Behind-closed-doors)

22 July 2025 Friendly	Bristol City	1–0	Newport County	Failand
12:00 BST	Morrison 90'	Report		Stadium: Robins High Performance Centre; Attendance: 0 (Behind-closed-doors)

22 July 2025 Friendly	Milton Keynes Dons	Cancelled	Bristol City	Denbigh
19:45 BST				Stadium: Stadium MK
Note: The fixture was cancelled following the two clubs meeting in the 2025–26 EFL Cup first round.

25 July 2025 Friendly	Cheltenham Town	0−0	Bristol City	Cheltenham
19:45 BST		Report		Stadium: Whaddon Road

26 July 2025 Friendly	Plymouth Argyle	0–2	Bristol City	Plymouth
15:00 BST		Report	Riis Jakobsen 25', 38'	Stadium: Home Park; Attendance: 9,704 (1,014 Away)

2 August 2025 Friendly	Bristol City	4–0	Real Valladolid	Bristol
15:00 BST	Randell 4'; McCrorie 6', 89'; Jakobsen 57'			Stadium: Ashton Gate

== Competitions ==
=== Overall record ===
Competition	First match	Last match	Starting round	Final position	Record							
Competition	First match	Last match	Starting round	Final position	Pld	W	D	L	GF	GA	GD	Win %
Championship	9 August 2025	2 May 2026	Matchday 1	12th	46	17	11	18	59	59	+0	36.96
FA Cup	10 January 2026	3 March 2026	Third round	Fourth round	2	1	0	1	5	2	+3	50.00
EFL Cup	12 August 2025	27 August 2025	First round	Second round	2	1	0	1	2	2	+0	50.00
Total					50	19	11	20	66	63	+3	38.00

Source: Soccerway

=== Championship ===
==== League table ====
Pos	Team	Pld	W	D	L	GF	GA	GD	Pts
10	Birmingham City	46	17	13	16	57	56	+1	64
11	Swansea City	46	18	10	18	57	59	−2	64
12	Bristol City	46	17	11	18	59	59	0	62
13	Sheffield United	46	18	6	22	66	66	0	60
14	Preston North End	46	15	15	16	55	62	−7	60

Source: EFL Official Website
Rules for classification: 1) Points; 2) Goal difference; 3) Number of goals scored; 4) Head-to-head results; 5) Wins; 6) Away goals; 7) Penalty points (sec 9.5); 8) Number of 12-point sending off offences; 9) Play-off (only if needed to determine promotion/relegation)

==== Results summary ====
Overall								Home						Away					
Pld	W	D	L	GF	GA	GD	Pts	W	D	L	GF	GA	GD	W	D	L	GF	GA	GD
46	17	11	18	59	59	0	62	9	4	9	33	31	+2	8	7	9	26	28	−2

Source: Soccerway

==== Results by round ====
Round	1	2	3	4	5	6	7	8	9	10	11	12	13	14	15	16	17	18	19	20	21	22	23	24	25	26	27	28	29	30	31	32	33	34	35	36	37	38	39	40	41	42	43	44	45	46
Ground	A	H	A	H	A	H	A	H	H	A	H	H	A	H	A	H	A	A	H	H	A	H	A	A	H	H	A	A	H	H	A	H	A	A	H	H	A	A	H	A	H	A	H	A	A	H
Result	W	D	D	W	W	L	D	D	L	W	W	W	L	L	D	W	L	W	L	D	L	W	W	L	W	L	D	L	W	L	W	D	L	W	L	L	L	D	L	W	W	D	L	D	L	W
Position	1	4	9	6	3	3	4	5	10	7	4	4	5	7	8	4	7	6	7	10	11	9	6	8	8	10	10	11	7	9	8	9	12	8	10	10	12	14	16	13	11	10	10	13	13	12
Points	3	4	5	8	11	11	12	13	13	16	19	22	22	22	23	26	26	29	29	30	30	33	36	36	39	39	40	40	43	43	46	47	47	50	50	50	50	51	51	54	57	58	58	59	59	62

Source: EFL
A = Away; H = Home; W = Win; D = Draw; L = Loss; P = Postponed

==== Matches ====
On 26 June, the fixtures were released.

Win Draw Loss Fixtures

9 August 2025 1	Sheffield United	1–4	Bristol City	Sheffield
17:30 BST	Campbell 14'	Report	Twine 5', 51'; McCrorie 26'; Mehmeti 46'	Stadium: Bramall Lane; Attendance: 28,033; Referee: Josh Smith

16 August 2025 2	Bristol City	0–0	Charlton Athletic	Bristol
15:00 BST		Report	Apter (yellow card) 73'	Stadium: Ashton Gate; Attendance: 24,721 (2,506 away); Referee: Ben Speedie

22 August 2025 3	Derby County	1–1	Bristol City	Derby
20:00 BST	Zetterström (yellow card) 65'; Adams (yellow card) 74'; Morris 86', (yellow card) 90+4'	Report	Twine 35'	Stadium: Pride Park Stadium; Attendance: 27,849; Referee: David Webb
Note: Fixture was originally scheduled for a 15:00 kick-off, but was moved live Sky Sports broadcasting.

30 August 2025 4	Bristol City	4–2	Hull City	Bristol
15:00 BST	Riis Jakobsen 18', 42'; Mehmeti 32'; Bird 78'; Knight (yellow card) 89'	Report	Gelhardt 3'; Akintola (yellow card) 52'; Joseph 90+3'	Stadium: Ashton Gate; Attendance: 21,385 (774 away); Referee: Gavin Ward

13 September 2025 5	Sheffield Wednesday	0–3	Bristol City	Owlerton
15:00 BST	Palmer (yellow card) 7'; Valery (yellow card) 59'	Report	Amass 6' (o.g.); Riis Jakobsen 18'; Mehmeti 32'	Stadium: Hillsborough Stadium; Attendance: 20,003; Referee: Tom Nield

21 September 2025 6	Bristol City	1–3	Oxford United	Bristol
15:00 BST	Mehmeti 53'; Twine (yellow card) 55'; Knight (yellow card) 74'; Vyner (yellow card) 76'; Dickie (yellow card) 89'	Report	Prelec 19'; Płacheta 45+3'; Vaulks (yellow card) 76'; Leigh 90'	Stadium: Ashton Gate; Attendance: 23,440; Referee: John Brooks
Note: Fixture was originally scheduled for 20 September, but was moved back a day.

27 September 2025 7	Preston North End	0–0	Bristol City	Preston
15:00 BST	Whiteman (yellow card) 36'; Hughes (yellow card) 57'; Armstrong (yellow card) 72'; Devine (yellow card) 75'	Report	Riis Jakobsen (yellow card) 30'	Stadium: Deepdale; Attendance: 15,295 (1,334 Bristol City fans); Referee: Bobby Madley

30 September 2025 8	Bristol City	1–1	Ipswich Town	Bristol
19:45 BST	Atkinson 18'; McCrorie (yellow card) 45+1'; Mehmeti (yellow card) 45+5'; Vyner (yellow card) 90+3'; Armstrong (yellow card) 90+7'	Report	Clarke 52' (pen.); Matusiwa (yellow card) 54'; Davis (yellow card) 65'	Stadium: Ashton Gate; Attendance: 23,329; Referee: John Busby

4 October 2025 9	Bristol City	1–2	Queens Park Rangers	Bristol
15:00 BST	Sykes (yellow card) 29'; Riis Jakobsen 32'; Mehmeti (yellow card) 48'; Vyner (yellow card) 73'; Atkinson (yellow card) 89'; Hirakawa (yellow card) 90+5'	Report	Kone (yellow card) 51', (goal) 66'; Smyth 84'	Stadium: Ashton Gate; Attendance: 24,200 (2,794 away); Referee: Edward Duckworth

18 October 2025 10	Norwich City	0–1	Bristol City	Norwich
15:00 BST	Medić (yellow card) 18'; Mattsson (yellow card) 89'	Report	Vyner (yellow card) 24'; McCrorie (yellow card) 37'; Randell (yellow card) 59'; Sykes 73'	Stadium: Carrow Road; Attendance: 26,249 (1,501 away); Referee: Tom Nield

21 October 2025 11	Bristol City	3–1	Southampton	Bristol
20:00 BST	Mehmeti 33'; Twine 57', 64'; Vítek (yellow card) 70'	Report	Armstrong 30'; Harwood-Bellis (yellow card) 83'; Fellows (yellow card) 90+5'	Stadium: Ashton Gate; Attendance: 24,019 (3,364 away); Referee: Anthony Backhouse
Note: Fixture was originally scheduled for a 19:45 kick-off, but was rescheduled for live Sky Sports broadcasting.

25 October 2025 12	Bristol City	1–0	Birmingham City	Bristol
15:00 BST	Twine (yellow card) 30'; Armstrong 42'; Mehmeti (yellow card) 66'	Report	Iwata (yellow card) 66'	Stadium: Ashton Gate; Attendance: 24,923 (3,006 away); Referee: James Linington

1 November 2025 13	Stoke City	5–1	Bristol City	Stoke-on-Trent
15:00 GMT	Mubama 4', 22', 67'; Tchamadeu (yellow card) 7', (goal) 47'; Manhoef 25'; Cresswell (yellow card) 45'; Seko (yellow card) 90+3'	Report	Sykes 82'	Stadium: Bet365 Stadium; Attendance: 23,241 (2,125 away); Referee: James Bell

4 November 2025 14	Bristol City	0–1	Blackburn Rovers	Bristol
19:45 GMT		Report	Guðjohnsen (yellow card) 37'; Ōhashi 45+5'; Tronstad (yellow card) 51'; Gueye (yellow card) 90+2'	Stadium: Ashton Gate; Attendance: 21,499 (467 away); Referee: Dean Whitestone

7 November 2025 15	Watford	1–1	Bristol City	Watford
20:00 GMT	Bola 6'; Petris (yellow card) 28'; Irankunda (yellow card) 33'	Report	Twine 29'; Mehmeti (yellow card) 53'	Stadium: Vicarage Road; Attendance: 19,574; Referee: Paul Tierney
Note: Fixture was originally scheduled for 8 November, but was rescheduled for live Sky Sports broadcasting.

22 November 2025 16	Bristol City	3–0	Swansea City	Bristol
12:30 GMT	Dickie 4'; Riis 31'; McCrorie (yellow card) 49'; Randell (yellow card) 52'; Hirakawa 82'	Report		Stadium: Ashton Gate; Attendance: 23,842 (2,483 away); Referee: Josh Smith
Note: Fixture was originally scheduled for a 15:00 kick-off, but was rescheduled for live Sky Sports broadcasting.

26 November 2025 17	Wrexham	2–0	Bristol City	Wrexham
19:45 GMT	Broadhead 16'; Scarr (yellow card) 50'; Vítek 74' (o.g.)	Report	Hirakawa (yellow card) 50'; Dickie (yellow card) 53'	Stadium: Racecourse Ground; Attendance: 10,540 (1,268 away); Referee: Ruebyn Ricardo

29 November 2025 18	Portsmouth	0–1	Bristol City	Milton
12:30 GMT	Dozzell (yellow card) 31'; Poole (yellow card) 49'; Murphy (yellow card) 52'	Report	Mehmeti 17'	Stadium: Fratton Park; Attendance: 20,388 (2,179 away); Referee: Sam Allison
Note: Fixture was originally scheduled for a 15:00 kick-off, but was rescheduled for live Sky Sports broadcasting.

6 December 2025 19	Bristol City	0–1	Millwall	Bristol
15:00 GMT	Armstrong (yellow card) 78'	Report	Bangura-Williams (yellow card) 25'; Cooper (yellow card) 50'; Ivanović 59'; Sturge (yellow card) 80'; Doughty (yellow card) 87'; Ballo (yellow card) 90'	Stadium: Ashton Gate; Attendance: 22,587 (1,590 away); Referee: Edward Duckworth

10 December 2025 20	Bristol City	2–2	Leicester City	Bristol
19:45 GMT	Twine (yellow card) 24'; Sykes 46'; Pring (yellow card) 64'; Riis Jakobsen 83'	Report	Fatawu (yellow card) 9'; Ayew 17' (pen.); De Cordova-Reid 45'; Nelson (yellow card) 50'; Stolarczyk (yellow card) 64'	Stadium: Ashton Gate; Attendance: 21,397 (1,203 away); Referee: James Linington

13 December 2025 21	Coventry City	1–0	Bristol City	Coventry
15:00 GMT	van Ewijk (yellow card) 57'; Mason-Clark 64'	Report	Borges (yellow card) 67'; Roberts (yellow card) 70'; Mehmeti (yellow card) 73'	Stadium: Coventry Building Society Arena; Attendance: 29,505 (1,266 away); Referee: Stephen Martin

20 December 2025 22	Bristol City	2–0	Middlesbrough	Bristol
15:00 GMT	Riis Jakobsen 17'; Armstrong (yellow card) 36'; Atkinson 62'; Pring (yellow card) 87'	Report	Whittaker (yellow card) 25'; Targett (yellow card) 33'; Ayling (yellow card) 87'	Stadium: Ashton Gate; Attendance: 24,259; Referee: Anthony Backhouse
Note: Fixture was originally scheduled for 31 January, but was rescheduled for live Sky Sports broadcasting.

26 December 2025 23	West Bromwich Albion	1–2	Bristol City	West Bromwich
15:00 GMT	Diakité (yellow card) 58', (goal) 85'		Mehmeti 4', (yellow card) 16'; McCrorie 22', (yellow card) 45+2'; Pring (yellow card) 62'	Stadium: Hawthorns; Attendance: 25,050; Referee: Will Finnie

29 December 2025 24	Millwall	2–1	Bristol City	Bermondsey
19:45 GMT	Neghli 16'; Doughty (yellow card) 23'; Sturge (yellow card) 38'; Crama (yellow card) 41'; Langstaff 81'; Ballo (yellow card) 83'	Report	Randell 49'; Borges (yellow card) 87'	Stadium: The Den; Attendance: 18,077 (2,202 away); Referee: David Webb

1 January 2026 25	Bristol City	5–0	Portsmouth	Bristol
15:00 GMT	Randell 11'; Mehmeti 24'; Twine 50'; Armstrong 59', 90+3'	Report	Le Roux (yellow card) 22'	Stadium: Ashton Gate; Attendance: 24,649 (2,464 away); Referee: James Bell

4 January 2026 26	Bristol City	0–2	Preston North End	Bristol
15:00 GMT	Knight (yellow card) 37'	Report	Dobbin 8'; Storey (yellow card) 30'; Thompson (yellow card) 69'; Devine 70'	Stadium: Ashton Gate; Attendance: 22,409 (737 away); Referee: Paul Tierney

17 January 2026 27	Oxford United	0–0	Bristol City	Littlemore
15:00 GMT	Mills (yellow card) 18'; Konak (yellow card) 29'	Report	Morsy (yellow card) 25'; Dickie (yellow card) 53'; Pring (yellow card) 79'	Stadium: Kassam Stadium; Attendance: 11,160 (1,492 away); Referee: Tim Robinson

20 January 2026 28	Ipswich Town	2–0	Bristol City	Ipswich
19:45 GMT	Clarke 8', 55'; Furlong (yellow card) 71'	Report	Borges (yellow card) 40'; Morsy (yellow card) 60'; Dickie (yellow card) 62'; Tanner (yellow card) 64'; Randell (yellow card) 87'; Armstrong (yellow card) 89'	Stadium: Portman Road; Attendance: 25,539; Referee: Dean Whitestone

24 January 2026 29	Bristol City	2–0	Sheffield Wednesday	Bristol
15:00 GMT	Twine 64'; Bell 78'	Report		Stadium: Ashton Gate; Attendance: 22,409 (737 away); Referee: Benjamin Speedie

30 January 2026 30	Bristol City	0–5	Derby County	Bristol
20:00 GMT	Pring (yellow card) 80'		Ozoh (yellow card) 11'; Brewster 13'; Brereton Diaz 16'; Clark 36'; Agyemang 66'; Salvesen 88'	Stadium: Ashton Gate; Attendance: 23,512; Referee: Tom Nield
Note: Fixture was originally scheduled for 31 January, but was rescheduled for live Sky Sports broadcasting.

7 February 2026 31	Hull City	2–3	Bristol City	Kingston upon Hull
15:00 GMT	McBurnie 24'; Dowell 78'; Collyer (yellow card) 81'; Slater (yellow card) 87'	Report	Atkinson 33'; McCrorie 39'; Riis 50'	Stadium: MKM Stadium; Attendance: 20,848 (823 away); Referee: Oliver Langford

17 February 2026 32	Bristol City	2–2	Wrexham	Bristol
19:45 GMT	Borges (yellow card) 44'; Armstrong 47'; Bird 89'; Burgzorg (yellow card) 90+1'	Report	Rathbone 34', (yellow card) 40'; Cleworth (yellow card) 54'; Hyam (yellow card) 73'; Williams 76' (o.g.)	Stadium: Ashton Gate; Attendance: 22,915 (1,042 away); Referee: Ruebyn Ricardo
Note: Fixture was originally scheduled for 14 February, but was rescheduled for live Sky Sports broadcasting. It was then later rearranged again due to City's advancement in the FA Cup.

21 February 2026 33	Swansea City	1–0	Bristol City	Swansea
12:30 GMT	Vipotnik 26'; Widell (yellow card) 44'; Fulton (yellow card) 87'	Report	Earthy (yellow card) 45+1'; Armstrong (yellow card) 72'; Bird (yellow card) 90'; Twine (yellow card) 90+2'	Stadium: Swansea.com Stadium; Attendance: 18,009; Referee: Will Finnie

24 February 2026 34	Blackburn Rovers	1–2	Bristol City	Blackburn
19:45 GMT	Ōhashi 6', (yellow card) 42'; Morishita (yellow card) 30'	Report	Riis 17'; Twine 31'; Morsy (yellow card) 45+3'; Knight (yellow card) 86'	Stadium: Ewood Park; Attendance: 10,999 (422 away); Referee: Matthew Donohue
Note: Fixture was initially scheduled for 25 February, but was rescheduled due to the Watford home fixture being scheduled for the Friday night.

27 February 2026 35	Bristol City	1–2	Watford	Bristol
20:00 GMT	Borges (yellow card) 26'; Twine 36'; Burgzorg (yellow card) 90+7'	Report	Kjerrumgaard 7'; Ngakia (yellow card) 58', (goal) 77'; Mfuni (yellow card) 58'; Kayembe (yellow card) 86'	Stadium: Ashton Gate; Attendance: 21,866 (1,141 away); Referee: Lewis Smith
Note: Fixture was originally scheduled for 14 February, but was rescheduled for live Sky Sports broadcasting.

7 March 2026 36	Bristol City	0–2	Coventry City	Bristol
15:00 GMT	Randell (yellow card) 29' (yellow-red card) 56'; Borges (yellow card) 45+7'; Eile (yellow card) 90+6'	Report	Sakamoto 37'; Latibeaudiere (red card) 43'; Mason-Clark (yellow card) 45'; Wright 45+6'; Grimes (yellow card) 78'	Stadium: Ashton Gate; Attendance: 23,493 (3,409 away); Referee: Matthew Donohue

10 March 2026 37	Leicester City	2–0	Bristol City	Leicester
19:45 GMT	Nelson 13', (yellow card) 63'; Fatawu 28'; Choudhury (yellow card) 36'	Report	Borges (yellow card) 61'; Riis (penalty missed) 65'; Armstrong (yellow card) 90+1'; Morsy (yellow card) 90+4'	Stadium: King Power Stadium; Attendance: 25,476 (498 away); Referee: Tom Nield

14 March 2026 38	Middlesbrough	1–1	Bristol City	Middlesbrough
12:30 GMT	Castledine 65'; Conway (yellow card) 88'	Report	Eile (yellow card) 35'; Pring (yellow card) 43'; Twine (yellow card) 53'; Morsy (yellow card) 53'; Armstrong (yellow card) 58'; Randell 90+6'	Stadium: Riverside Stadium; Attendance: 34,988; Referee: Stephen Martin
Note: Fixture was initially scheduled for a 15:00 kick-off, but was brought forward for Sky Sports broadcasting.

21 March 2026 39	Bristol City	0–1	West Bromwich Albion	Bristol
15:00 GMT	Horvat (yellow card) 39'	Report	Campbell 26'; Styles (yellow card) 84'	Stadium: Ashton Gate; Attendance: 23,659 (3,388 away); Referee: Thomas Kirk

3 April 2026 40	Charlton Athletic	1–2	Bristol City	Charlton
15:00 GMT	Dykes 30'; Ramsay (yellow card) 60'; Clarke (yellow card) 70'	Report	Twine 11', (yellow card) 30'; Eile 55'; Sykes (yellow card) 90+4'	Stadium: The Valley; Attendance: 20,925 (2,409 away); Referee: Ben Toner

6 April 2026 41	Bristol City	1–0	Sheffield United	Bristol
15:00 BST	Pring (yellow card) 4'; Sykes 23'	Report	Cannon (yellow card) 20'; Brooks (yellow card) 66'; Bamford (yellow card) 69'	Stadium: Ashton Gate; Attendance: 21,858 (1,290 away); Referee: Lewis Smith

11 April 2026 42	Queens Park Rangers	0–0	Bristol City	Shepherd's Bush
12:30 BST		Report		Stadium: Loftus Road; Attendance: 16,745; Referee: Edward Duckworth
Note: Fixture was initially scheduled for a 15:00 kick-off, but was brought forward for Sky Sports broadcasting.

18 April 2026 43	Bristol City	2–4	Norwich City	Bristol
15:00 BST	Morsy 2'; Bell 90+3'	Report	Touré 51', (yellow card) 54', (goal) 70', 75'; McLean (yellow card) 72'; Córdoba 78'	Stadium: Ashton Gate; Attendance: 23,149 (2,033 away); Referee: Ruebyn Ricardo

21 April 2026 44	Southampton	2–2	Bristol City	Southampton
19:45 BST	Charles (yellow card) 28'; Larin 29', (yellow card) 80'; Downes (yellow card) 62'; Stewart 74'	Report	Manning 5' (o.g.); Bell 63'; Pring (yellow card) 76'; Morsy (yellow card) 90+1'; Dickie (yellow card) 90+8'	Stadium: St Mary's Stadium; Attendance: 28,446; Referee: Elliot Bell
Note: Live on Sky Sports.

25 April 2026 45	Birmingham City	2–1	Bristol City	Bordesley
15:00 BST	Neumann 8'; Solís (yellow card) 14', (goal) 29'; Stansfield (yellow card) 81'; Klarer (yellow card) 90+4'	Report	Burgzorg (yellow card) 75'; Horvat 82' (pen.)	Stadium: St Andrew's; Attendance: 27,210; Referee: Robert Jones

2 May 2026 46	Bristol City	2–0	Stoke City	Bristol
12:30 BST	Burgzorg 1'; McCrorie (yellow card) 63'; Bell 88'	Report	Pearson (yellow card) 35'; Tchamadeu (yellow card) 60'; Rak-Sakyi (yellow card) 90+5'	Stadium: Ashton Gate; Attendance: 24,671; Referee: Ben Toner

=== FA Cup ===
Bristol City were drawn at home to Watford in the third round and away to Port Vale in the fourth round.

Win Draw Loss Fixtures

10 January 2026 Third round	Bristol City	5–1	Watford	Bristol
17:45 GMT	Jakobsen 2', 68', 76'; Mehmeti 37'; Atkinson 66'; Lumley (yellow card) 79'	Report	Grieves 74'; Abankwah (yellow card) 60'	Stadium: Ashton Gate; Attendance: 13,291; Referee: Tom Reeves

3 March 2026 Fourth round	Port Vale	1–0 (a.e.t.)	Bristol City	Burslem
19:45 GMT	Lawrence-Gabriel (yellow card) 37'; Walters (yellow card) 48'; John (yellow card) 65'; Humphreys (yellow card) 103'; Waine 112'	Report	Pring (yellow card) 13'; Knight (yellow card) 105'	Stadium: Vale Park; Attendance: 4,611 (1,626 away fans); Referee: Elliot Bell
Note: Fixture was postponed and rearranged due to unplayable playing surface.

=== EFL Cup ===
Bristol City were drawn at home to Milton Keynes Dons in the first round and away to Fulham in the second round.

Win Draw Loss Fixtures

12 August 2025 First round	Bristol City	2–0	Milton Keynes Dons	Bristol
19:45 BST	Knight 6'; Hirakawa 61'	Report	Thompson (yellow card) 31'; Hogan (yellow card) 54'	Stadium: Ashton Gate; Attendance: 10,280 (371 Away); Referee: Bobby Madley

27 August 2025 Second round	Fulham	2–0	Bristol City	Fulham
19:45 BST	Tanner 8' (o.g.); Jiménez 21'; Castagne (yellow card) 39'	Report		Stadium: Craven Cottage; Attendance: 11,749; Referee: Lewis Smith

== Statistics ==
=== Appearances and goals ===
Players with no appearances are not included on the list, italics indicate a loaned in player

No.	Pos	Nat	Player	Total		Championship		FA Cup		EFL Cup	
No.	Pos	Nat	Player	Apps	Goals	Apps	Goals	Apps	Goals	Apps	Goals
2	DF	(Scotland) SCO	Ross McCrorie	41	3	34+5	3	1+0	0	1+0	0
3	DF	(England) ENG	Cameron Pring	26	0	16+9	0	1+0	0	0+0	0
4	MF	(England) ENG	Adam Randell	47	3	42+2	3	0+1	0	1+1	0
5	DF	(England) ENG	Robert Atkinson	26	4	23+2	3	1+0	1	0+0	0
6	MF	(England) ENG	Max Bird	18	2	4+11	2	1+0	0	1+1	0
7	FW	(Japan) JPN	Yū Hirakawa	26	2	3+20	1	0+1	0	1+1	1
8	MF	(England) ENG	Joe Williams	2	0	0+2	0	0+0	0	0+0	0
10	MF	(England) ENG	Scott Twine	48	11	42+3	11	1+1	0	1+0	0
11	FW	(Suriname) SUR	Delano Burgzorg	16	1	4+11	1	1+0	0	0+0	0
12	MF	(Republic of Ireland) IRL	Jason Knight	38	1	30+4	0	1+1	0	2+0	1
13	GK	(England) ENG	Joe Lumley	4	0	0+0	0	2+0	0	2+0	0
14	MF	(Slovenia) SLO	Tomi Horvat	16	1	11+4	1	0+1	0	0+0	0
16	DF	(England) ENG	Robert Dickie	36	1	30+3	1	1+0	0	2+0	0
17	MF	(Republic of Ireland) IRL	Mark Sykes	41	4	25+13	4	0+1	0	1+1	0
18	FW	(Denmark) DEN	Emil Riis Jakobsen	47	12	37+7	9	1+1	3	0+1	0
19	DF	(England) ENG	George Tanner	37	0	27+6	0	1+1	0	2+0	0
20	FW	(England) ENG	Sam Bell	16	4	3+10	4	2+0	0	1+0	0
21	DF	(Brazil) BRA	Neto Borges	40	0	30+8	0	1+1	0	0+0	0
23	GK	(Czech Republic) CZE	Radek Vítek	41	0	41+0	0	0+0	0	0+0	0
24	DF	(England) ENG	Seb Naylor	1	0	0+0	0	1+0	0	0+0	0
25	FW	(Italy) ITA	Ephraim Yeboah	1	0	0+0	0	0+0	0	1+0	0
26	MF	(England) ENG	Josh Stokes	2	0	0+0	0	0+0	0	1+1	0
27	FW	(England) ENG	Harry Cornick	1	0	0+1	0	0+0	0	0+0	0
29	FW	(England) ENG	Leo Pecover	2	0	0+2	0	0+0	0	0+0	0
30	FW	(Republic of Ireland) IRL	Sinclair Armstrong	45	4	11+30	4	1+1	0	1+1	0
31	MF	(England) ENG	Elijah Morrison	1	0	0+0	0	0+0	0	1+0	0
36	FW	(England) ENG	Olly Thomas	2	0	0+2	0	0+0	0	0+0	0
38	DF	(Sweden) SWE	Noah Eile	16	1	14+1	1	1+0	0	0+0	0
40	MF	(Egypt) EGY	Sam Morsy	20	1	13+5	1	2+0	0	0+0	0
44	MF	(England) ENG	George Earthy	11	0	2+8	0	0+1	0	0+0	0
Players who featured but departed the club during the season:
1	GK	(Republic of Ireland) IRL	Max O'Leary	5	0	5+0	0	0+0	0	0+0	0
9	FW	(France) FRA	Fally Mayulu	11	0	1+9	0	0+0	0	0+1	0
11	MF	(Albania) ALB	Anis Mehmeti	31	9	28+0	8	1+0	1	1+1	0
14	DF	(Kenya) KEN	Zak Vyner	30	0	27+0	0	1+0	0	2+0	0
24	DF	(England) ENG	Haydon Roberts	13	0	3+9	0	0+0	0	0+1	0
