= Vít =

Vít is a Czech masculine given name, the Czech rendition of the Latin name Vitus, popularised through the Christian tradition of Saint Vitus (290–302). Notable people with the name include:

- Vít Baránek (born 1974), Czech footballer
- Vít Bárta (born 1973), Czech politician
- Vít Beneš (born 1988), Czech footballer
- Vít Christov (born 1996), Czech ice hockey player
- Vít Fousek Jr. (born 1940), Czech cross-country skier
- Vít Fousek Sr. (1913–1990), Czech cross-country skier
- Vít Jedlička (born 1983), Czech politician
- Vít Jonák (born 1991), Czech ice hockey player
- Vít Kárník (1926–1994), Czech geophysicist
- Vít Kaňkovský (born 1970), Czech politician
- Vit Klemes (1932–2010), Czech-Canadian hydrologist
- Vít Krejčí (born 2000), Czech basketball player
- Vít Müller (born 1996), Czech athlete
- Vít Nemrava (born 1996), Czech footballer
- Vít Přindiš (born 1989), Czech slalom canoeist
- Vít Štětina (born 1989), Czech footballer
- Vít Vrtělka (born 1982), Czech footballer
- Vít Zouhar (born 1966), Czech musician

== See also ==
- Vítek, a Czech surname and given name derived from Vít
