= Ephraim Yeboah =

Italian footballer (born 2006)

Personal information
- Full name: Ephraim Osei Yeboah
- Date of birth: 21 July 2006 (age 20)
- Place of birth: Montirone, Italy
- Height: 1.77 m (5 ft 10 in)
- Position: Forward

Team information
- Current team: Bristol City
- Number: 25

Youth career
- 2014–2021: Bristol Inner City FC
- 2021–2023: Bristol City

Senior career*
Years	Team	Apps	(Gls)
2023–	Bristol City	10	(0)
2024	→ Bath City (loan)	9	(2)
2024–2025	→ Doncaster Rovers (loan)	11	(0)
2025	→ Dunfermline Athletic (loan)	14	(0)
2026	→ Carlisle United (loan)	5	(0)
2026	→ Southend United (loan)	1	(0)
- * Club domestic league appearances and goals as of 17 October 2026 (UTC)

Ephraim Osei Yeboah (born 21 July 2006) is an Italian professional footballer who plays as a forward for EFL Championship club Bristol City.

== Early life ==
Yeboah was born in Montirone, Italy, but moved to Bristol with his family at the age of eight. His family are friends with footballer Saikou Janneh, who first helped Yeboah join Inner Bristol City, in order to help him settle while he was still learning to speak English.

== Career ==
In August 2021, Yeboah, along with teammate Elijah Morrison, were recruited by Bristol City from the Bristol Inner City Football Academy in Easton.

In June 2023, Yeboah began training with the first team squad and finished second behind Ayman Benarous in the Bristol City pre-season fitness SDS test. In July 2023, he was included in the Bristol City first-team squad on a pre-season training camp to Austria and signed a three-year professional contract with the club. He made his professional debut for Bristol City on 9 August 2023, in the EFL Cup at home against Oxford United in a 5–1 win. Following successive appearances as an impact substitute, on 20 August 2023, manager Nigel Pearson denied that Yeboah would be leaving on loan to gain experience and intimated he was in his first team thoughts, saying, "Why would we let anyone else have him?"

On 27 February 2024, Yeboah joined National League South side Bath City on loan until the end of the 2023–24 season. That same day, he scored on his league debut for Bath City, against Braintree Town.

On 11 June 2024, EFL League Two side Doncaster Rovers announced that Yeboah would join the club on loan until the end of the 2024–25 season. He was recalled by Bristol City in January 2025 after making 11 league appearances for Doncaster.

On 31 January 2025, Yeboah joined Dunfermline Athletic on loan until the end of the season.

On 26 March 2026, he joined Carlisle United on loan until the end of the 2025–26 season.

On 26 September 2026, Yeboah joined National League side Southend United on an initial 28-day loan. On 8 October 2026, it was confirmed that Yeboah had returned to his parent club.

== Personal life ==
Born in Italy, Yeboah is of Ghanaian descent.

== Career statistics ==
As of end of 2025–26 season

Appearances and goals by club, season and competition
Club	Season	League			National Cup (Note: Includes FA Cup, Scottish Cup)		League Cup (Note: Includes EFL Cup)		Other		Total	
Club	Season	Division	Apps	Goals	Apps	Goals	Apps	Goals	Apps	Goals	Apps	Goals
Bristol City	2023–24	Championship	10	0	0	0	2	0	—		12	0
Bristol City	2024–25	Championship	0	0	0	0	0	0	0	0	0	0
Bristol City	2025–26	Championship	0	0	0	0	1	0	—		1	0
Bristol City	Total		10	0	0	0	3	0	—		13	0
Bath City (loan)	2023–24	National League South	9	2	—		—		1 (Note: Appearance in National League South play-offs)	0	10	2
Doncaster Rovers (loan)	2024–25	League Two	11	0	0	0	1	0	3 (Note: Appearances in the EFL Trophy)	2	15	2
Dunfermline Athletic (loan)	2024–25	Scottish Championship	14	0	1	0	—		1 (Note: Appearance in Scottish Challenge Cup)	0	16	0
Carlisle United (loan)	2025–26	National League	6	0	—		—		1 (Note: Appearance in National League play-offs)	0	7	0
Career total			50	2	1	0	4	0	6	2	61	4
