= Christov =

Christov (feminine: Christova) is a Bulgarian surname, and is a variant of Christ. Notable people with the surname include:

- Carolyn Christov-Bakargiev (born 1957), Italian–American art historian, critic and curator
- Christo Christov (1926–2007), Bulgarian film director
- Diana Christova, Bulgarian sprint canoer
- Nentcho Christov (1933–2003), Bulgarian cyclist
- Petko Christov (1950–2020), Bulgarian Roman Catholic bishop
- Solveig Christov (1918–1984), Norwegian writer
- Vít Christov (born 1996), Czech ice hockey player
- Vojtech Christov (born 1945), Bulgarian football referee

== See also ==
- Hristov
