= Bernd Eibler =

Austrian football manager

Personal information
- Full name: Bernd Eibler
- Date of birth: 9 March 1994 (age 32)
- Place of birth: Wiener Neustadt, Austria

Managerial career
- Years: Team
- 2019–2020: SV Mattersburg (assistant)
- 2020–2023: New York Red Bulls (assistant)
- 2024–2025: 1. FC Köln (assistant)
- 2025–2026: Bristol City (assistant)

Bernd Eibler (born 8 March 1994) is an Austrian football manager. He is one of a growing number of managers who has never played football professionally.

== Managerial career ==
=== Early career ===
In 2018, Eibler was hired by the Austrian Football Association to be one of three coaches to help promote women's soccer in Austria by setting up training schools and tournaments across the country.

=== SV Mattersburg ===
Eibler began his professional coaching career in January 2019, joining Austrian Football Bundesliga club SV Mattersburg as a video analyst and assistant manager. He worked for the club for two years until their bankruptcy in August 2020.

=== New York Red Bulls ===
On 13 October 2020, Eibler signed with the New York Red Bulls in MLS to serve as an assistant under new manager Gerhard Struber.

=== 1. FC Köln ===
On 22 June 2024, Eibler was confirmed as one of Gerhard Struber's assistant coaches at 1. FC Köln. He left with Struber on 5 May 2025.

=== Bristol City ===
On 27 June 2025, Eibler was appointed assistant coach at Championship club Bristol City, once again working under Gerhard Struber. He departed the club alongsider Struber in March 2026.
