= 2026–27 Middlesbrough F.C. season =

English football club season

Middlesbrough
2026–27 season
- Owner: Steve Gibson
- Chairman: Steve Gibson
- Head coach: Kim Hellberg
- Stadium: Riverside Stadium
- Championship: 1st
- EFL Cup: Third round
- Top goalscorer: League: Will Lankshear (11); All: Will Lankshear (13)
Home colours	Away colours	Third colours

The 2026–27 season is the 151st season in the history of Middlesbrough Football Club and their tenth consecutive season in the Championship. In addition to the domestic league, the club are also participating in the FA Cup and the EFL Cup.

The season marks the 150th anniversary for the club, and is the first season to feature the 2026 crest.

== Kits ==
Home (Note: In honour of the club's 150th anniversary, the home kit features a centralised crest, complete with the club's iconic red first adopted in 1901, combined with a gold trim.)	Away (Note: Inspired by what is believed to be the oldest-surviving Middlesbrough shirt in existence, the away kit is an eggshell white with blue and polka dot trim, reminiscent of the kit worn by Middlesbrough between 1886–1890, including the club's first campaign in the Northern League.)	Third (Note: An electric yellow and navy design for the third kit, featuring a sublimation of the lion from the club's new crest.)	150th Kit (Note: For the club's 150th celebration fixture against Wolverhampton Wanderers on 10 October, a navy shirt with darker blue shorts, adorned by the first-ever Middlesbrough team in 1876, will be worn.)

== Transfers and contracts ==
=== In ===
Date	Pos.	Player	From	Fee	Ref.
First Team
15 June 2026 (Note: The transfer was announced on 28 May, and would become official on June 15 once the transfer window opened.)	LW	(Ecuador) Jeremy Sarmiento	(England) Brighton & Hove Albion	£3,200,000	
3 July 2026	CAM	(Jamaica) Myles Peart-Harris	(England) Oxford United	Free	
10 July 2026	CF	(Scotland) Kyle Joseph	(England) Hull City	£4,000,000	
22 July 2026	CF	(England) Will Lankshear	(England) Tottenham Hotspur	£10,000,000 (Note: A potential further £10,000,000 with performance-related add-ons.)	
28 July 2026	CM	(United States) Sebastian Berhalter	(Canada) Vancouver Whitecaps	£1,650,000	
4 August 2026	LB	(United States) Max Arfsten	(United States) Columbus Crew	£5,600,000	
8 August 2026	GK	(Czech Republic) Radek Vítek	(England) Manchester United	£7,000,000 (Note: A potential further £7,000,000 in performance-based add-ons.)	
15 August 2026	CB	(England) Ashley Phillips	(England) Tottenham Hotspur	£7,000,000 (Note: A potential further £13,000,000 in add-ons)	
24 August 2026	LB	(England) Sam Byram	(England) Leeds United	Free	
31 August 2026	CAM	(United States) Rokas Pukstas	(Croatia) Hajduk Split	£4,300,000	
Academy
1 July 2026	GK	(England) DJ Bernard	(England) Liverpool	Free	
1 July 2026	LB	(Malaysia) (Sierra Leone) Cayden Cole	(England) Hull City	Free	
1 July 2026	RB	(England) Ezra Tika-Lemba	(England) Newcastle United	Free	
18 August 2026	CF	(Northern Ireland) Eamon Tohill	(Northern Ireland) Cliftonville	Undisclosed	
1 September 2026	CB	(England) Abdulhalim Okunola	(England) Southampton	Undisclosed	

=== Loans in ===
Date	Pos.	Player	From	Loaned until	Ref.
First Team
1 September 2026	CDM	(Scotland) Connor Barron	(Scotland) Rangers	End of Season	
1 September 2026	RW	(England) Amario Cozier-Duberry	(England) Brighton & Hove Albion	End of Season	
Academy

=== Loans out ===
Date	Pos.	Player	To	Loaned until	Ref.
First Team
7 August 2026	LW	(Suriname) Delano Burgzorg	(England) Preston North End	End of Season	
10 August 2026	LB	(England) Finley Munroe	(England) Blackpool	End of Season	
20 August 2026	RW	(Curaçao) Sontje Hansen	(Turkey) Gaziantep	End of Season	
Academy
21 July 2026	LB	(England) Ollie Samuels	(Northern Ireland) Cliftonville	End of Season	
20 August 2026	CM	(England) Brayden Johnson	(England) Harrogate Town	End of Season	
30 August 2026	CB	(England) Jack Daley	(England) Gillingham	End of Season	
1 September 2026	CAM	(England) Fin Cartwright	(England) Grimsby Town	End of Season	
11 September 2026	CM	(England) Daniel James	(England) Whitby Town	10 October 2026	
5 November 2026	CF	(England) Layton Campbell	(England) Kidderminster Harriers	1 January 2027	

=== Out ===
Date	Pos.	Player	To	Fee	Ref.
First Team
2 July 2026	CDM	(England) Hayden Hackney	(England) Everton	£17,000,000 (Note: A further £8,000,000 of potential add-ons.)	
8 August 2026	CF	(Senegal) Kaly Sène	(Switzerland) BSC Young Boys	£1,000,000	
30 August 2026	CDM	(Ivory Coast) Abdoulaye Kanté	(Saudi Arabia) Al-Ettifaq	£3,000,000	
4 September 2026	RW	(England) Morgan Whittaker	(United States) Colorado Rapids	£7,900,000	
Academy
24 July 2026	CB	(England) Archie Baptiste	(England) Harrogate Town	Undisclosed	

=== Released / out of contract ===
Date	Pos.	Player	Subsequent club	Joined date	Ref.
First Team
30 June 2026	CDM	(England) Daniel Barlaser	(England) Milton Keynes Dons	4 July 2026	
30 June 2026	CB	(England) Dael Fry	(England) Birmingham City	3 July 2026	
30 June 2026	LW	(Australia) Samuel Silvera	(England) Milton Keynes Dons	31 July 2026	
30 June 2026	CAM	(Republic of Ireland) Alex Gilbert	(England) Leyton Orient	3 September 2026	
30 June 2026	CF	(Finland) Marcus Forss	(Uzbekistan) Neftchi Fergana	14 September 2026	
30 June 2026	CB	(Republic of Ireland) Darragh Lenihan			
17 August 2026	GK	(Senegal) Seny Dieng	(Greece) Atromitos	17 August 2026	
Academy
30 June 2026	RW	(England) Max Howells	(England) Darlington	1 July 2026	
30 June 2026	CF	(England) Leandro Bevin	(England) Cheshunt	8 July 2026	
30 June 2026	GK	(England) Nathan Fisher	(England) Hartlepool United	26 July 2026	
30 June 2026	RB	(England) Will McPartland	(England) Sheffield Wednesday	8 September 2026	
30 June 2026	LB	(England) Prince Acheampong			
30 June 2026	CF	(England) Hazeem Bakre			
30 June 2026	GK	(Wales) Oliver Lloyd			
30 June 2026	RW	(England) William Okine			
30 June 2026	LB	(England) Logan Williams			
30 June 2026	CB	(England) McCartney Woodhouse			

=== New contracts ===
Date	Pos.	Player	Contract expiry	Ref.
First Team
27 July 2026	GK	(Scotland) Jon McLaughlin	30 June 2027	
Academy
1 July 2026 (Note: Contract agreement was announced on 21 May, and would become official on July 1)	CM	(England) Lucas Harrison	30 June 2028 (Note: First professional contract)	

== Pre-season and friendlies ==
On 5 June, Boro announced a pre-season fixture against La Liga side Espanyol. A fortnight later, a trip to Scotland to face Celtic was confirmed.

Win Draw Loss Fixtures

11 July 2026 Friendly	Farense	2–2	Middlesbrough	Quinta do Lago, Portugal
13:00 WEST		Report	Strelec 55', 90+2'	Stadium: The Campus; Attendance: 0 (BCD)

18 July 2026 Friendly	Celtic	1−1	Middlesbrough	Parkhead, Scotland
15:00 BST	Durán 32'	Report	Strelec 26'	Stadium: Celtic Park

25 July 2026 Friendly	Middlesbrough	1–3	Huddersfield Town	Hurworth-on-Tees
13:00 BST	Whittaker	Report		Stadium: Rockliffe Park; Attendance: 0 (BCD)

1 August 2026 Friendly	Middlesbrough	3–3	Espanyol	Middlesbrough
15:00 BST	Castledine 8', 53'; Whittaker 31'	Report	M. Fernández 20'; Dolan 42'; Hernández 47'	Stadium: Riverside Stadium

== Competitions ==
=== Overall record ===
Competition	First match	Last match	Starting round	Final position	Record							
Competition	First match	Last match	Starting round	Final position	Pld	W	D	L	GF	GA	GD	Win %
Championship	August 2026	May 2027	Matchday 1	TBD	16	9	5	2	32	19	+13	56.25
FA Cup	January 2027	TBD	Third round	TBD	0	0	0	0	0	0	+0	—
EFL Cup	August 2026	September 2026	First round	Third round	3	2	0	1	4	4	+0	66.67
Total					19	11	5	3	36	23	+13	57.89

Last updated: 21 November 2026
Source: Soccerway

=== Championship ===
==== League table ====
Pos	Team	Pld	W	D	L	GF	GA	GD	Pts	Promotion, qualification or relegation
1	Middlesbrough	16	9	5	2	32	19	+13	32	Promotion to the Premier League
2	Stoke City	16	10	2	4	25	18	+7	32	Promotion to the Premier League
3	Wolverhampton Wanderers	16	9	4	3	28	19	+9	31	Qualification for Championship play-off semi-finals
4	Birmingham City	16	8	5	3	28	15	+13	29	Qualification for Championship play-off semi-finals
5	West Bromwich Albion	16	8	5	3	25	17	+8	29	Qualification for Championship play-off quarter-finals

Updated to match(es) played on 21 November 2026. Source: EFL Official Website
Rules for classification: 1) Points; 2) Goal difference; 3) Number of goals scored; 4) Head-to-head results; 5) Wins; 6) Away goals; 7) Penalty points (sec 9.5); 8) Number of 12-point sending off offences; 9) Play-off (only if needed to determine promotion/relegation)

==== Results summary ====
Overall								Home						Away					
Pld	W	D	L	GF	GA	GD	Pts	W	D	L	GF	GA	GD	W	D	L	GF	GA	GD
16	9	5	2	32	19	+13	32	6	2	0	19	9	+10	3	3	2	13	10	+3

Last updated: 21 November 2026.
Source: Soccerway

==== Results by round ====
Round	1	2	3	4	5	7	6^{1}	8	9	10	11	12	13	14	15	16	17	18	19	20	21	22	23	24	25	26	27	28	29	30	31	32	33
Ground	H	A	H	A	A	H	H	A	H	A	H	A	H	A	A	H	H	A	H	A	A	H	A	H	H	A	A	H	H	A	A	H	H
Result	W	L	W	D	W	W	D	D	W	W	D	W	W	L	D	W																	
Position	5	11	5	5	2	4	3	3	2	2	3	1	1	1	2	1																	
Points	3	3	6	7	10	13	14	15	18	21	22	25	28	28	29	32																	

Source: EFL
A = Away; H = Home; W = Win; D = Draw; L = Loss; P = Postponed
Notes:
- ^{1} Matchday 6 (vs Millwall) was rescheduled due to EFL Cup involvements.

==== Matches ====
On 25 June, the Championship fixtures were revealed.

Win Draw Loss Fixtures

15 August 2026 1	Middlesbrough	2–1	Lincoln City	Middlesbrough
15:00 BST	Lankshear 62', 90+1'	Report	Reach 12'; Draper (yellow card) 36'; Olaofe (yellow card) 89'	Stadium: Riverside Stadium; Attendance: 31,487 (2,118 away); Referee: Bobby Madley

22 August 2026 2	Blackburn Rovers	2–1	Middlesbrough	Blackburn
15:00 BST	Afolayan (yellow card) 24'; McLoughlin (yellow card) 45+2'; Guðjohnsen 49'; Cantwell 55', (yellow card) 76'; Morsy (yellow card) 58'	Report	Sarmiento 12'; Lankshear (yellow card) 90'	Stadium: Ewood Park; Attendance: 18,918 (6,236 away); Referee: Tom Reeves

29 August 2026 3	Middlesbrough	3–1	West Bromwich Albion	Middlesbrough
12:30 BST	Lankshear 48', 73'; Jones 87'	Report	Diakité (yellow card) 61'; Morgan 66'	Stadium: Riverside Stadium; Attendance: 29,571 (1,934 away); Referee: Paul Tierney
Note: Fixture was initially scheduled for a 15:00 kick-off, but was brought forward for live Sky Sports.

2 September 2026 4	Burnley	1–1	Middlesbrough	Burnley
20:00 BST	Mejbri (yellow card) 28'; Raghouber 54', (yellow card) 90+1'	Report	Morris 23'; Lankshear (yellow card) 39'; Jones (yellow card) 71'	Stadium: Turf Moor; Attendance: 20,938 (2,000 away); Referee: Matt Donohue
Note: Fixture was initially scheduled for a 19:45 kick-off, but was pushed back for live Sky Sports.

5 September 2026 5	Queens Park Rangers	0–1	Middlesbrough	Shepherd's Bush
15:00 BST	Kamara (yellow card) 90+6'	Report	Lankshear 20'; Malanda (yellow card) 58'; Brittain (yellow card) 76'	Stadium: MATRADE Loftus Road Stadium; Attendance: 17,007 (2,300 away); Referee: Andy Madley

12 September 2026 7	Middlesbrough	4–3	Norwich City	Middlesbrough
15:00 BST	Berhalter 4', 36'; Cozier-Duberry 7'; McGree (yellow card) 53'; Phillips (yellow card) 89', (goal) 90+1'	Report	Touré 1'; Makama 70'; Wright 75'; Stacey (yellow card) 90'	Stadium: Riverside Stadium; Attendance: 29,697 (900 away); Referee: Adam Herczeg

15 September 2026 6	Middlesbrough	2–2	Millwall	Middlesbrough
19:45 BST	Cozier-Duberry 50'; Lankshear 61'; McGree (yellow card) 66'	Report	Arconte 11'; Dykes 36'; Mazou-Sacko (yellow card) 59'	Stadium: Riverside Stadium; Attendance: 27,684 (497 away); Referee: Bobby Madley
Note: Fixture was initially scheduled for 8 September, but was pushed back a week due to both clubs involvement in the EFL Cup.

19 September 2026 8	Birmingham City	2–2	Middlesbrough	Birmingham
15:00 BST	Vázquez (yellow card) 24'; Millar 55'; McGree 59' (o.g.); Neumann (yellow card) 88'	Report	Arfsten 45'; Malanda 88'	Stadium: St Andrew's @ Knighthead Park; Attendance: 27,017 (2,113 away); Referee: David Webb

10 October 2026 9	Middlesbrough	1–0	Wolverhampton Wanderers	Middlesbrough
15:00 BST	Berhalter (yellow card) 11'; Borges (yellow card) 40'; Lankshear 57'; Peart-Harris (yellow card) 90+4'	Report	Djiga (yellow card) 12'; Saïd (yellow card) 53'; Bellegarde (yellow card) 66'	Stadium: Riverside Stadium; Attendance: 32,125 (2,058 away); Referee: Farai Hallam

13 October 2026 10	Stoke City	2–3	Middlesbrough	Stoke-on-Trent
20:00 BST	Borges 50' (o.g.); Graham (yellow card) 68'; Boženík 85'	Report	Brittain 48'; Berhalter (yellow card) 51'; Lankshear 73'; Borges 90+1'	Stadium: Bet365 Stadium; Attendance: 22,538 (2,000 away); Referee: Elliott Bell
Note: Fixture was initially scheduled for a 19:45 kick-off, but was pushed back for live Sky Sports broadcasting.

17 October 2026 11	Middlesbrough	2–2	Cardiff City	Middlesbrough
12:30 BST	Conway 58'; Lankshear 61'	Report	Moylan 22', (yellow card) 88'; Bagan (yellow card) 25'; Tanner 45+1'; Osho (red card) 83'	Stadium: Riverside Stadium; Attendance: 28,991 (850 away); Referee: Tom Nield
Note: Fixture was initially scheduled for a 15:00 kick-off, but was brought forward for live Sky Sports broadcasting.

23 October 2026 12	Bolton Wanderers	1–5	Middlesbrough	Horwich
20:00 BST	Bair 45+2'; Sheehan (yellow card) 63'	Report	Morris 13'; Lankshear 31', 78'; Brunt 39' (o.g.); Cozier-Duberry 73'	Stadium: Toughsheet Community Stadium; Attendance: 26,257 (5,206 away); Referee: Simon Hooper
Note: Fixture was initially scheduled for 24 October, but was brought forward to the night prior for live Sky Sports broadcasting.

31 October 2026 13	Middlesbrough	3–0	Charlton Athletic	Middlesbrough
15:00 GMT	Berhalter 12'; McGree (yellow card) 36'; Lankshear 44', 82'; Phillips (yellow card) 58'	Report	Bindon (yellow card) 9'	Stadium: Riverside Stadium; Attendance: 29,831 (500 away); Referee: Will Finnie

4 November 2026 14	Wrexham	2–0	Middlesbrough	Wrexham
19:45 GMT	Dobson (yellow card) 62'; Thomason 70'; Rathbone 84'	Report		Stadium: Racecourse Ground; Attendance: 10,532 (1,287 away); Referee: Oliver Langford

7 November 2026 15	Watford	0–0	Middlesbrough	Watford
15:00 GMT	Traoré (yellow card) 71'	Report	Brittain (yellow card) 21'; Byram (yellow card) 43'; Berhalter (yellow card) 59'	Stadium: Vicarage Road; Attendance: 18,170; Referee: Gavin Ward

21 November 2026 16	Middlesbrough	2–0	Bristol City	Middlesbrough
15:00 GMT	Malanda 40'; Morris (yellow card) 42'; Strelec 54'; Conway (yellow card) 79'	Report		Stadium: Riverside Stadium; Attendance: 29,316; Referee: Ruebyn Ricardo

24 November 2026 17	Middlesbrough	v	Swansea City	Middlesbrough
19:45 GMT				Stadium: Riverside Stadium

27 November 2026 18	Southampton	v	Middlesbrough	Southampton
20:00 GMT				Stadium: St Mary's Stadium
Note: Fixture was initially scheduled for 24 October, but was brought forward to the night prior for live Sky Sports broadcasting.

5 December 2026 19	Middlesbrough	v	Derby County	Middlesbrough
12:30 GMT				Stadium: Riverside Stadium
Note: Fixture was initially scheduled for a 15:00 kick-off, but was brought forward for live Sky Sports broadcasting.

8 December 2026 20	West Ham United	v	Middlesbrough	Stratford
20:00 GMT				Stadium: London Stadium
Note: Fixture was initially scheduled for a 19:45 kick-off, but was pushed back for live Sky Sports broadcasting.

12 December 2026 21	Preston North End	v	Middlesbrough	Preston
12:30 GMT				Stadium: Deepdale
Note: Fixture was initially scheduled for a 15:00 kick-off, but was brought forward for live Sky Sports broadcasting.

19 December 2026 22	Middlesbrough	v	Portsmouth	Middlesbrough
15:00 GMT				Stadium: Riverside Stadium

26 December 2026 23	Sheffield United	v	Middlesbrough	Sheffield
12:30 GMT				Stadium: Bramall Lane
Note: Fixture was initially scheduled for a 15:00 kick-off, but was brought forward for live Sky Sports broadcasting.

29 December 2026 24	Middlesbrough	v	Bolton Wanderers	Middlesbrough
19:45 GMT				Stadium: Riverside Stadium

1 January 2027 25	Middlesbrough	v	Preston North End	Middlesbrough
15:00 GMT				Stadium: Riverside Stadium

16 January 2027 26	Cardiff City	v	Middlesbrough	Leckwith
15:00 GMT				Stadium: Cardiff City Stadium

23 January 2027 27	Charlton Athletic	v	Middlesbrough	Charlton
15:00 GMT				Stadium: The Valley

27 January 2027 28	Middlesbrough	v	Wrexham	Middlesbrough
19:45 GMT				Stadium: Riverside Stadium

30 January 2027 29	Middlesbrough	v	Watford	Middlesbrough
15:00 GMT				Stadium: Riverside Stadium

5 February 2027 30	Bristol City	v	Middlesbrough	Ashton Gate
20:00 GMT				Stadium: Ashton Gate
Note: Fixture was initially scheduled for 6 February, but was brought forward to the night before for live Sky Sports broadcasting.

13 February 2027 31	Norwich City	v	Middlesbrough	Norwich
15:00 GMT				Stadium: Carrow Road

16 February 2027 32	Middlesbrough	v	Stoke City	Middlesbrough
19:45 GMT				Stadium: Riverside Stadium
Note: Fixture was initially scheduled for 17 February, but was brought forward a day due to also being in action on the following Friday.

19 February 2027 33	Middlesbrough	v	Birmingham City	Middlesbrough
20:00 GMT				Stadium: Riverside Stadium
Note: Fixture was initially scheduled for 6 February, but was brought forward to the night before for live Sky Sports broadcasting.

=== FA Cup ===
Win Draw Loss Fixtures

=== EFL Cup ===
Middlesbrough were drawn at home to Wrexham in the first round, and then away to Doncaster Rovers in the second round and Crystal Palace in the third round.

Win Draw Loss Fixtures

7 August 2026 First round	Middlesbrough	1–0	Wrexham	Middlesbrough
20:00 BST	Lankshear 61', (yellow card) 69'	Report	O'Brien (yellow card) 43'; Smith (yellow card) 56'; Hyam (yellow card) 85'; Doyle (yellow card) 90+1'	Stadium: Riverside Stadium; Attendance: 18,221 (537 away); Referee: Will Finnie

25 August 2026 Second round	Doncaster Rovers	1–3	Middlesbrough	Doncaster
19:30 BST	Gotts (yellow card) 26'; Broadbent (yellow card) 77'; Hutchinson 90+2'	Report	Joseph 34'; Peart-Harris (yellow card) 45+1'; Borges (yellow card) 46'; Lankshear 78'; Sarmiento 87'	Stadium: Club Doncaster Sports Village; Attendance: 6,883 (2,942 away); Referee: Edward Duckworth

8 September 2026 Third round	Crystal Palace	3–0	Middlesbrough	Selhurst
19:45 BST	Larsen 37', 53'; Kamada 72'	Report	Malanda (yellow card) 64'; Peart-Harris (yellow card) 83'	Stadium: Selhurst Park; Attendance: 13,074 (2,500 away); Referee: Tony Harrington

== Statistics ==
=== Appearances and goals ===
As of match played 21 November 2026

Players with no appearances are not included on the list; italics indicate loaned in player

No.	Pos	Nat	Player	Total		Championship		FA Cup		EFL Cup	
No.	Pos	Nat	Player	Apps	Goals	Apps	Goals	Apps	Goals	Apps	Goals
1	GK	(Czech Republic) CZE	Radek Vítek	16	0	16+0	0	0+0	0	0+0	0
2	DF	(England) ENG	Callum Brittain	19	1	16+0	1	0+0	0	2+1	0
3	DF	(England) ENG	Sam Byram	4	0	1+2	0	0+0	0	1+0	0
4	DF	(England) ENG	Ashley Phillips	15	1	11+2	1	0+0	0	0+2	0
5	DF	(Canada) CAN	Alfie Jones	7	1	2+3	1	0+0	0	2+0	0
6	MF	(United States) USA	Sebastian Berhalter	18	3	13+3	3	0+0	0	2+0	0
7	FW	(England) ENG	Will Lankshear	17	15	12+2	13	0+0	0	1+2	2
8	MF	(Australia) AUS	Riley McGree	16	0	12+4	0	0+0	0	0+0	0
9	FW	(Scotland) SCO	Tommy Conway	15	1	8+6	1	0+0	0	1+0	0
10	MF	(United States) USA	Aidan Morris	17	2	15+0	2	0+0	0	1+1	0
11	FW	(England) ENG	Amario Cozier-Duberry	12	3	11+0	3	0+0	0	1+0	0
12	DF	(England) ENG	Luke Ayling	16	0	9+4	0	0+0	0	3+0	0
13	FW	(Slovakia) SVK	David Strelec	8	1	2+4	1	0+0	0	1+1	0
14	MF	(Jamaica) JAM	Myles Peart-Harris	16	0	3+11	0	0+0	0	2+0	0
16	FW	(Ecuador) ECU	Jeremy Sarmiento	14	2	4+8	1	0+0	0	2+0	1
17	FW	(United States) USA	Max Arfsten	17	1	4+11	1	0+0	0	2+0	0
19	MF	(England) ENG	Leo Castledine	9	0	1+5	0	0+0	0	2+1	0
21	MF	(United States) USA	Rokas Pukštas	2	0	0+1	0	0+0	0	0+1	0
22	FW	(Scotland) SCO	Kyle Joseph	16	1	5+9	0	0+0	0	1+1	1
25	DF	(England) ENG	George Edmundson	1	0	0+0	0	0+0	0	0+1	0
29	DF	(France) FRA	Adilson Malanda	17	2	15+0	2	0+0	0	2+0	0
30	DF	(Brazil) BRA	Neto Borges	17	1	12+2	1	0+0	0	2+1	0
31	GK	(England) ENG	Sol Brynn	3	0	0+0	0	0+0	0	3+0	0
44	MF	(England) ENG	Cruz Ibeh	1	0	0+0	0	0+0	0	0+1	0
46	MF	(England) ENG	Fin Cartwright	1	0	0+0	0	0+0	0	0+1	0
Players who featured but departed the club permanently during the season:
11	FW	(England) ENG	Morgan Whittaker	5	0	3+0	0	0+0	0	2+0	0
42	MF	(Ivory Coast) CIV	Abdoulaye Kanté	1	0	1+0	0	0+0	0	0+0	0

=== Assists ===
As of match played 21 November 2026

Rank	No.	Nat.	Po.	Name	Championship	FA Cup	EFL Cup	Total
1	11	(England)	FW	Amario Cozier-Duberry	6	0	0	6
2	9	(Scotland)	FW	Tommy Conway	4	0	0	4
2	6	(United States)	MF	Sebastian Berhalter	3	0	1	4
4	8	(Australia)	MF	Riley McGree	3	0	0	3
5	2	(England)	DF	Callum Brittain	2	0	0	2
5	12	(England)	DF	Luke Ayling	2	0	0	2
7	11	(England)	FW	Morgan Whittaker	1	0	0	1
7	4	(England)	DF	Ashley Phillips	0	0	1	1
7	16	(Ecuador)	FW	Jeremy Sarmiento	0	0	1	1
Total					21	0	3	24

=== Disciplinary record ===
As of match played 21 November 2026

Rank	No.	Pos.	Nat.	Player	Championship			FA Cup			EFL Cup			Total		
Rank	No.	Pos.	Nat.	Player	Yellow card	(yellow card) (yellow-red card)	Red card	Yellow card	(yellow card) (yellow-red card)	Red card	Yellow card	(yellow card) (yellow-red card)	Red card	Yellow card	(yellow card) (yellow-red card)	Red card
1	8	CM	(Australia)	Riley McGree	3	0	0	0	0	0	0	0	0	3	0	0
1	6	CM	(United States)	Sebastian Berhalter	3	0	0	0	0	0	0	0	0	3	0	0
1	7	CF	(England)	Will Lankshear	2	0	0	0	0	0	1	0	0	3	0	0
1	14	CAM	(Jamaica)	Myles Peart-Harris	1	0	0	0	0	0	2	0	0	3	0	0
5	2	RB	(England)	Callum Brittain	2	0	0	0	0	0	0	0	0	2	0	0
5	4	CB	(England)	Ashley Phillips	2	0	0	0	0	0	0	0	0	2	0	0
5	29	CB	(France)	Adilson Malanda	1	0	0	0	0	0	1	0	0	2	0	0
5	30	LB	(Brazil)	Neto Borges	1	0	0	0	0	0	1	0	0	2	0	0
9	3	LB	(England)	Sam Byram	1	0	0	0	0	0	0	0	0	1	0	0
9	5	CB	(Canada)	Alfie Jones	1	0	0	0	0	0	0	0	0	1	0	0
9	10	CM	(United States)	Aidan Morris	1	0	0	0	0	0	0	0	0	1	0	0
Totals					18	0	0	0	0	0	5	0	0	23	0	0

== Awards ==
=== Player awards ===
==== EFL Championship Player of the Month ====
Month	Player	Result	Ref.
August	(England) Will Lankshear	Nominated	
October	(England) Will Lankshear	Won	

==== PFA Championship Fans' Player of the Month ====
Month	Player	Result	Ref.
September	(United States) Sebastian Berhalter	Nominated	
October	(England) Will Lankshear	Won	

==== EA Sports FC EFL Young Player of the Month ====
Month	Player	Result	Ref.
September	(England) Will Lankshear	Won	
October	(England) Will Lankshear	Won	

=== Manager awards ===
==== EFL Championship Manager of the Month ====
Month	Manager	Result	Ref.
October	(Sweden) Kim Hellberg	Won	
