= Leo Pecover =

English footballer (born 2008)

Personal information
- Full name: Leo James Pecover
- Date of birth: 9 April 2008 (age 18)
- Place of birth: Slough, England
- Position: Midfielder

Team information
- Current team: Bristol City
- Number: 29

Youth career
- –2025: Bristol City

Senior career*
| Years | Team | Apps | (Gls) |
| 2025– | Bristol City | 3 | (0) |
| 2026 | → Weston-super-Mare (loan) | 16 | (1) |
- * Club domestic league appearances and goals as of 18:53, 2 May 2026 (UTC)

Leo James Pecover (born 9 April 2008) is an English professional footballer who plays for EFL Championship club Bristol City as a midfielder.

== Career ==
Pecover came through the Bristol City Academy and after training with the senior team in the summer of 2024, was part of the youth team which won the 2024–25 Professional U18 Development League Division Two title.

Pecover signed a first professional contract with Bristol City ahead of the 2025-26 season. Pecover was an unused substitute for five matches for the British City prior to making his professional debut on 21 October 2025 in a 3-1 home win over Southampton in the EFL Championship, at the age of 17 years-old, appearing as a second-half substitute for Scott Twine, under Bristol City head coach Gerhard Struber who praised him after his debut.
