= Vitek =

Vitek may refer to:

- VITEK, automated microbiology analyzer
- Vítek, Czech surname and given name, including its Anglicised form Vitek
- 30253 Vítek, main-belt asteroid
- Vitek Tracz (born 1940), British-Polish entrepreneur
- Witold Kiełtyka, nicknamed Vitek (1984–2007), Polish musician
