= Seb Naylor =

English association football player (born 2005)

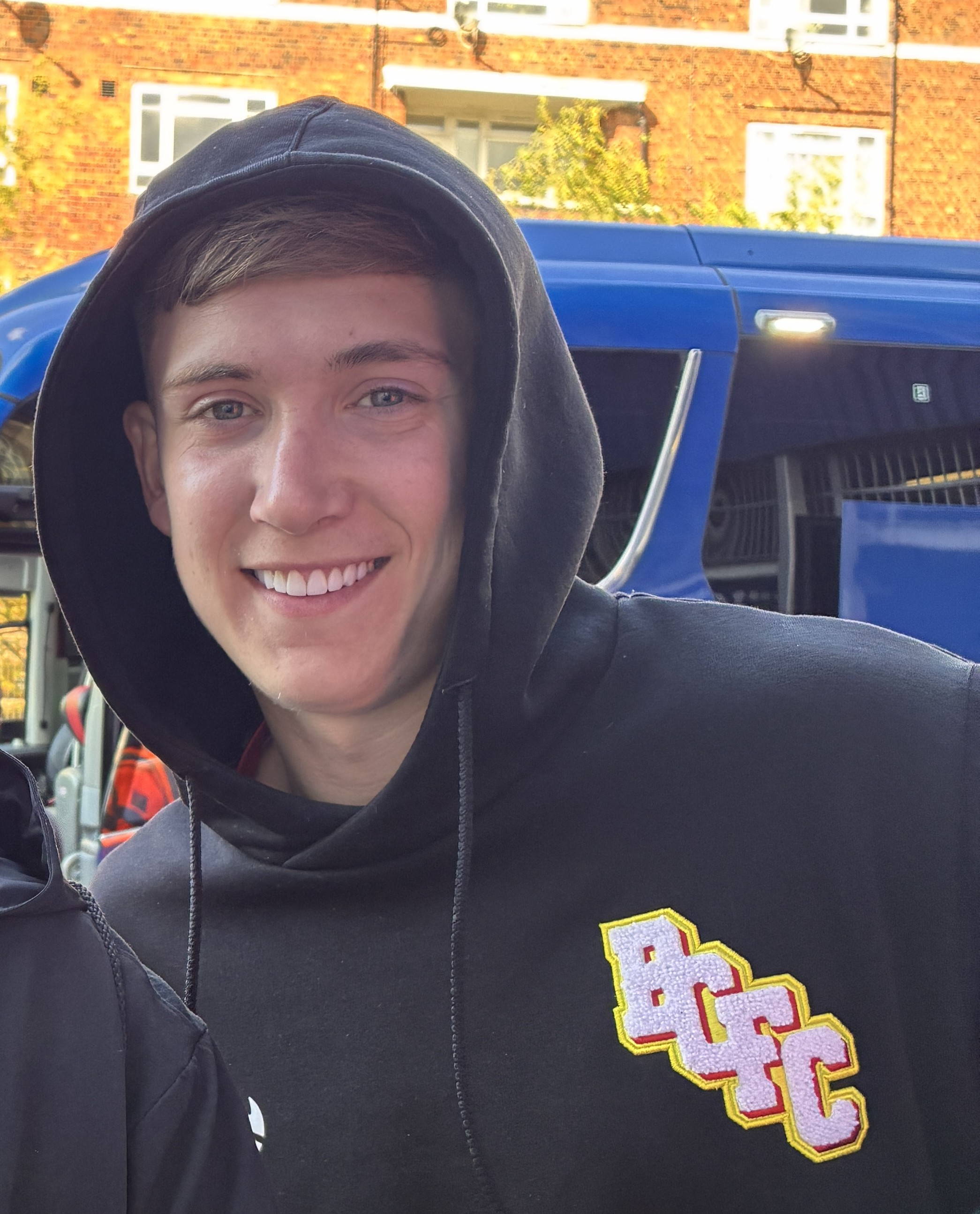

Personal information
- Full name: Sebastian Jacob Naylor
- Date of birth: 10 September 2005 (age 21)
- Place of birth: Calderdale, England
- Position: Defender

Team information
- Current team: Yeovil Town (on loan from Bristol City)
- Number: 24

Youth career
- 2013–2026: Manchester City

Senior career*
Years	Team	Apps	(Gls)
2026–	Bristol City	0	(0)
2026–	→ Yeovil Town (loan)	4	(0)
- * Club domestic league appearances and goals as of 22:47, 21 November 2026 (UTC)

Sebastian Jacob Naylor (born 10 September 2005) is an English professional footballer who plays as a defender for National League side Yeovil Town, on loan from EFL Championship club Bristol City.

== Career ==
Naylor came through the academy system at Manchester City having joined at the age of eight years-old. He was part of the a Manchester City side which won the FA Youth Cup in 2023-24 and made 19 appearances as they won the Premier League 2 title the following season, after stepping up to the under-21s.

In January 2026, he signed for EFL Championship club Bristol City for an undisclosed fee but with a reported 25% sell-on clause, signing a three and-a-half year contract. Having initially featured for the Bristol city youth team the following month, Naylor made his senior debut for Bristol City on 3 March 2026 as a starter in the FA Cup against Port Vale.

On 23 October 2026, Naylor joined National League side Yeovil Town on loan until 3 January 2027.

== Career statistics ==
As of match played 21 November 2026

Appearances and goals by club, season and competition
Club	Season	League			FA Cup		EFL Cup		Other		Total	
Club	Season	Division	Apps	Goals	Apps	Goals	Apps	Goals	Apps	Goals	Apps	Goals
Manchester City U21	2024–25	—			—		—		2 (Note: Appearance(s) in EFL Trophy)	0	2	0
Manchester City U21	2025–26	—			—		—		1	0	1	0
Manchester City U21	Total		—		—		—		3	0	3	0
Bristol City	2025–26	Championship	0	0	1	0	0	0	—		1	0
Bristol City	2026–27	Championship	0	0	0	0	0	0	—		0	0
Bristol City	Total		0	0	1	0	0	0	—		1	0
Yeovil Town (loan)	2026–27	National League	4	0	1	0	—		1 (Note: Appearance in Somerset Premier Cup)	0	6	0
Career total			4	0	2	0	0	0	4	0	10	0
