= Jerrold Vitek =

American neurologist

- Born: Minnesota, USA

Academic background
- Education: BA, 1973, University of Minnesota Duluth; PhD, 1984, Neurophysiology, MD, University of Minnesota
- Thesis: The effects of dentate nuclear output via pathways not involving the sensorimotor cortex on the amplitude and organization of the stretch reflex in decerebrate cats (1984)
- Academic advisor: Mahlon DeLong

Jerrold Lee Vitek is an American neurologist. He is the Head of the Neurology Department, Director of the Neuromodulation Research Program, and Center Director of the University of Minnesota Udall Center of Excellence for Parkinson's Research. Vitek's clinical interests include movement disorders and evaluation for deep brain stimulation (DBS) and his current research activities focus on Parkinson's disease, dystonia, tremor and deep brain stimulation.

== Early life and education ==
Vitek completed his Bachelor of Arts degree at the University of Minnesota Duluth in 1973 and began working a factory-line job in Chicago. While working, he was deciding whether to join the Peace Corps in Botswana or continue onto graduate school. He eventually chose to enrol at the University of Minnesota for his PhD and a medical degree. From there, he completed his Fellowship in Movement Disorders at Emory University and Residency in Neurology at Johns Hopkins Hospital. While at Johns Hopkins University, he worked alongside Mahlon DeLong which he calls "one of the most important developments in my career."

== Career ==
Upon completing his residency, Vitek accepted a faculty position at Johns Hopkins University working alongside Frederick Lenz and DeLong to establish the functional neurosurgery program at the Johns Hopkins Hospital. Due to his relationship with DeLong, Vitek followed him to Emory University School of Medicine to develop and direct the program for functional and stereotactic neurology. With DeLong, he began exploring pallidotomy, using radiofrequency lesioning to destroy cells in the internal segment of the pallidum, the output nucleus of the basal ganglia, a procedure called "pallidotomy." While serving in this role, he was the co-principal investigator on the FDA's essential tremor and Parkinsonian tremor pacemaker. At the turn of the century, Vitek began exploring the use of electrical stimulation of precise areas of the brain in order to get rid of Parkinson's disease. He started to use the newly approved electrical stimulation of the globus pallidus and subthalamic nucleus to explore the effects of deep-brain stimulation, hoping to determine which locations work best for specific symptoms. In an effort to make their procedure more precise, he also used data collected from the brains of monkeys which showed that only a part of the basal ganglia controls motor function.

Vitek left Emory in 2004 after he was recruited by the Cleveland Clinic to co-chair their newly created Brain Neuromodulation Center. His wife encouraged him to accept a position as Department Chair at the University of Minnesota and he recruited most of team from the Cleveland Clinic to join him. In September 2016, Vitek was appointed Director of the Udall Center of Excellence in Parkinson’s Disease Research to improve the lives of patients with Parkinson’s disease. In this role, he also directed the Neuromodulation Research Program where he was the coordinating principal investigator for the INTREPID study which evaluated the safety of Boston Scientific’s Vercise DBS system in 292 patients at 23 sites and also evaluated its effectiveness. After co-leading the clinical study that helped Boston Scientific's Vercise Deep Brain Stimulation System for treating Parkinsons reach FDA approval, he performed the first surgery using DBS. By 2018, he was the recipient of the Javits Neuroscience Investigator Award from the National Institute of Neurological Disorders and Stroke.
