= Neto Borges =

Brazilian footballer (born 1996)

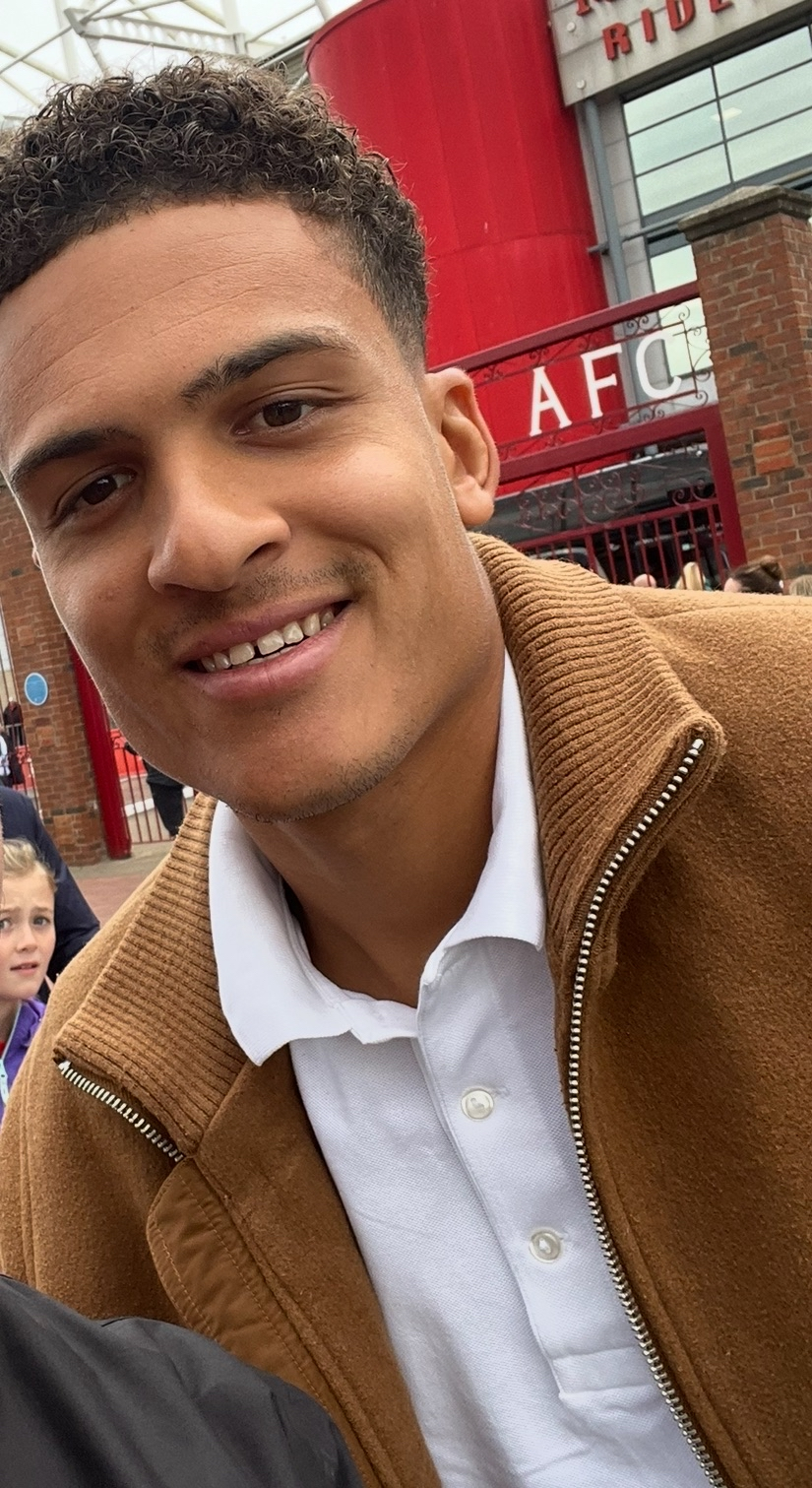
- Neto with Middlesbrough in 2024.

Personal information
- Full name: Vivaldo Borges dos Santos Neto
- Date of birth: 13 September 1996 (age 30)
- Place of birth: Saubara, Bahia, Brazil
- Height: 1.85 m (6 ft 1 in)
- Position: Left-back

Team information
- Current team: Middlesbrough
- Number: 30

Youth career
- Boca Júnior

Senior career*
Years	Team	Apps	(Gls)
2017	Boca Júnior	13	(0)
2017	Itabaiana	5	(0)
2017	Atlético Tubarão	0	(0)
2018–2019	Hammarby	26	(0)
2019–2022	Genk	6	(0)
2020–2021	→ Vasco da Gama (loan)	19	(0)
2021–2022	→ Tondela (loan)	29	(1)
2022–2024	Clermont	61	(3)
2024–	Middlesbrough	48	(2)
2025–2026	→ Bristol City (loan)	38	(0)
- * Club domestic league appearances and goals as of 00:20, 14 October 2026 (UTC)

Vivaldo Borges dos Santos Neto (born 13 September 1996), commonly known as Neto Borges or simply Borges, is a Brazilian professional footballer who plays as a left-back for EFL Championship club Middlesbrough.

== Career ==
=== Brazil ===
Neto Borges emerged into playing regular first team football in 2017, spending part of the year at Boca Júnior and Itabaiana. He later went to Atlético Tubarão and featured as the club won their first Copa Santa Catarina title in late 2017.

=== Hammarby ===
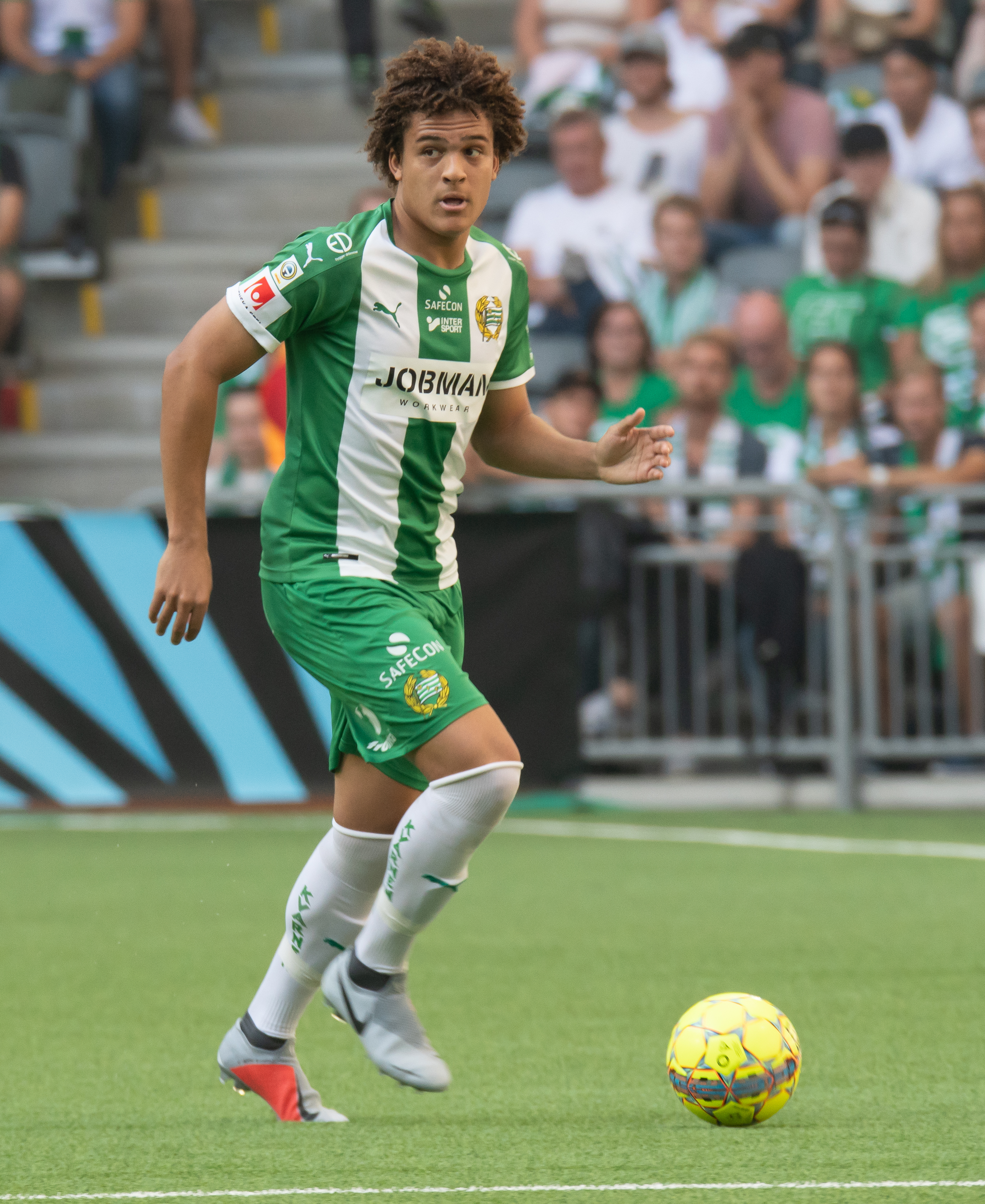
Neto with Hammarby in 2018.

Ahead of the 2018 season, Neto Borges transferred to Hammarby in the Allsvenskan. He signed a three-and-a-half-year deal with the Swedish club. He made his league debut for Hammarby on 1 April against Sirius in a 3–1 home win, playing the full 90 minutes.

Borges went on to play 26 games for the club in Allsvenskan, providing four assists, as Hammarby finished fourth in the league. He was chosen one of the eleven best players of the 2018 season by Cmore Sports, Fotbollskanalen and Playmaker.

=== Genk ===
On 3 January 2019, Borges completed a transfer to Genk in the Belgian First Division A. He signed a three-and-a-half-year contract with the club, with an option for a further. Hammarby confirmed that they received a club-record fee for Borges, reportedly set between €2 million and €3 million. On 5 August 2020, it was announced that Borges had agreed a contract to play with Brazilian Club Vasco da Gama until July 2021.

=== Clermont ===
On 13 June 2022, Borges signed a contract for two years with an option for the third year with Clermont in France.

=== Middlesbrough ===
On 27 August 2024, Middlesbrough announced that they had completed a deal to sign Borges from Clermont on a three year contract.

On 31 August 2025, Borges joined Bristol City on loan until the end of the season.

== Career statistics ==
As of 13 October 2026

Appearances and goals by club, season and competition
Club	Season	League			National cup (Note: Includes Norwegian Football Cup, Belgian Cup, Taça de Portugal, Coupe de France, FA Cup)		League cup (Note: Includes EFL Cup)		Other		Total	
Club	Season	Division	Apps	Goals	Apps	Goals	Apps	Goals	Apps	Goals	Apps	Goals
Boca Júnior	2017	Campeonato Sergipano	13	0	0	0	—		—		13	0
Itabaiana	2017	Brasileiro Série D	5	0	0	0	—		—		5	0
Hammarby	2018	Allsvenskan	26	0	4	0	—		—		30	0
Genk	2018–19	Belgian First Division A	1	0	0	0	—		—		1	0
Genk	2019–20	Belgian First Division A	5	0	1	0	—		1 (Note: Appearance in UEFA Champions League)	0	7	0
Genk	Total		6	0	1	0	—		1	0	8	0
Vasco da Gama (loan)	2020	Brasileiro Série A	19	0	1	0	—		3 (Note: Appearance in Copa Sudamericana)	0	23	0
Tondela (loan)	2020–21	Primeira Liga	29	1	6	2	0	0	—		35	3
Clermont	2022–23	Ligue 1	33	3	1	0	—		—		34	3
Clermont	2023–24	Ligue 1	28	0	2	0	—		—		30	0
Clermont	Total		61	3	3	0	—		—		64	3
Middlesbrough	2024–25	Championship	35	1	0	0	0	0	—		35	1
Middlesbrough	2025–26	Championship	3	0	—		1	0	—		4	0
Middlesbrough	2026–27	Championship	10	1	0	0	3	0	0	0	13	1
Middlesbrough	Total		48	2	0	0	4	0	—		52	2
Bristol City (loan)	2025–26	Championship	38	0	2	0	—		—		40	0
Career total			237	6	17	2	2	0	4	0	261	8

== Honours ==
Atlético Tubarão

- Copa Santa Catarina: 2017

Genk

- Belgian First Division A: 2018–19
