= Hristov =

Hristov or Khristov (Bulgarian: Христов) is a Bulgarian surname meaning "son of Hristo" or "Hristo's". The female version of the surname is Hristova (Bulgarian: Христова, also spelled Khristova), which may refer to:

== Hristov/Khristov ==
- Aleksandar Khristov (born 1964), Bulgarian boxer
- Andrea Hristov (born 1999), Bulgarian footballer
- Dobri Hristov (1875–1941), Bulgarian composer
- Gjorgji Hristov (born 1976), Macedonian footballer
- Lazar Khristov (born 1954), Bulgarian sprint canoer
- Marian Hristov (born 1973), Bulgarian footballer
- Petko Hristov (born 1999), Bulgarian footballer
- Raycho Khristov (born 1945), Bulgarian Olympic gymnast
- Valentin Hristov (born 1956), Bulgarian weightlifter
- Valentin Hristov (born 1994), Bulgarian-born Azerbaijani weightlifter

== Hristova/Khristova ==
- Elena Hristova (born 2011), Bulgarian rhythmic gymnast
- Hristina Hristova (born 1954), Bulgarian politician and former MEP
- Ivanka Khristova (1941–2022), Bulgarian shot putter
- Lora Hristova (born 2003), Bulgarian biathlete
- Magdalena Khristova (born 1977), Bulgarian long jumper and sprinter
- Tsvetanka Khristova (1962–2008), Bulgarian discus thrower

== See also ==
- Christov
- Bulgarian surname
