= Vít Vrtělka =

Czech footballer

Personal information
- Date of birth: 21 October 1982 (age 44)
- Place of birth: Czechoslovakia
- Height: 1.80 m (5 ft 11 in)
- Position: Midfielder

Team information
- Current team: Zlín (assistant); Zlín B (manager)

Youth career
- 1994–1998: Spartak Hulín
- 1998–2001: Zlín

Senior career*
Years	Team	Apps	(Gls)
2003–2009	Zlín	92	(1)
2002	→ Kroměříž (loan)		
2009	Mutěnice		
2009–2010	Chemnitzer FC	27	(1)
2010–2011	Ústí nad Labem	23	(1)
2011–2017	Baník Sokolov	107	(4)
2017	→ Karlovy Vary (loan)		
2018–2020	Olympia Březová		
2020	Baník Sokolov	0	(0)

Managerial career
- 2017–2019: Baník Sokolov (U19)
- 2020: Baník Sokolov (assistant)
- 2020–2021: Baník Sokolov
- 2021–2022: Dukla Prague (assistant)
- 2022–: Zlín (assistant)
- 2022–: Zlín B
- * Club domestic league appearances and goals

Vít Vrtělka (born 21 October 1982) is a Czech football coach and former player, who is currently assistant coach at FC Trinity Zlín. In his playing career he, among others, played for FC Fastav Zlín, FK Ústí nad Labem and FK Baník Sokolov.

== Career ==
=== Later career ===
After a long stint at Baník Sokolov - from 2011 to the end of the 2016/2017 season - Vrtělka ended his professional career and took up the role of youth coach at Baník Sokolov. In addition to his coaching duties, from August 2018 Vrtělka also started playing for Olympia Brezova himself.

From 1 January 2020, Vrtělka became a member of Baník Sokolov's first team staff, as he was appointed assistant coach to newly appointed head coach, Bohuslav Pilný. In June and July 2020, Vrtělka was registered as a part of the squad and was on the bench as a part of the squad for a few games, however, without getting any minutes. In mid July 2020, Vrtělka was appointed head coach of Sokolov, after Pilný was fired. He held the position until the end of the season.

In June 2021, he joined Dukla Prague's backroom staff as assistant coach to manager Bohuslav Pilný. In June 2022, after 13 years, Vrtělka returned to Zlín, where he was hired as assistant coach for the first team and head coach of the club's B-team.
