= Bohuslav Pilný =

Czech footballer and manager (born 1973)

Personal information
- Date of birth: 2 March 1973 (age 53)
- Place of birth: Czechoslovakia
- Height: 1.77 m (5 ft 10 in)
- Position: Defender

Team information
- Current team: Prostějov (manager)

Youth career
- Rozhovice

Senior career*
Years	Team	Apps	(Gls)
1990–1999	Hradec Králové	120	(5)
1999–2003	Slovan Liberec	60	(3)
2003	Hradec Králové	11	(0)
2003–2005	Slovan Liberec	17	(1)

Managerial career
- 2005: FK Nová Paka
- 2005–2008: SK Převýšov
- 2009–2011: FK Kolín
- 2011–2013: SK Převýšov
- 2014: Hradec Králové (assistant)
- 2014–2017: Hradec Králové
- 2017–2018: Viktoria Žižkov
- 2018–2019: Příbram (assistant)
- 2019–2020: Baník Sokolov
- 2021–2022: Dukla Praha
- 2022–2025: Hradec Králové (youth)
- 2025: Sellier & Bellot Vlašim
- 2026–: Prostějov
- * Club domestic league appearances and goals

Bohuslav Pilný (born 22 March 1973) is a Czech football manager and former player. He played in the top flight of his country, making more than 200 appearances spanning the existence of the Czechoslovak First League and the Czech First League.

== Coaching career ==
Following his playing career, he took charge of FK Nová Paka and later Bohemian Football League club SK Převýšov. He left Převýšov in December 2008. In January 2009, he became manager of FK Kolín.

Before later being announced as the manager of Czech First League side FC Hradec Králové.

He was appointed as head coach/manager of Viktoria Žižkov in October 2017, however his position was terminated at the end of May 2018.

Following a spell at 1. FK Příbram as an assistant manager, Pilný was appointed manager of FK Baník Sokolov on 13 December 2019.

On 1 September 2025, Pilný was appointed manager of Sellier & Bellot Vlašim.

On 14 June 2026, Pilný was appointed manager of Prostějov.

== Honours ==
=== Club ===
Slovan Liberec

- Czech Cup: 1999–2000
- Czech First League: 2001–02
