= Elijah Morrison =

English footballer (born 2006)

Personal information
- Date of birth: 18 March 2006 (age 20)
- Place of birth: Bristol, England
- Height: 1.83 m (6 ft 0 in)
- Positions: Full-back; wing-back

Team information
- Current team: Bristol City
- Number: 31

Youth career
- –2025: Bristol City

Senior career*
Years	Team	Apps	(Gls)
2024–	Bristol City	4	(0)
2026	→ Forest Green Rovers (loan)	8	(0)

International career^{‡}
2024	England U18	2	(0)
- * Club domestic league appearances and goals as of 22:09, 2 May 2026 (UTC) ‡ National team caps and goals as of 12:08, 28 May 2024 (UTC)

Elijah Morrison (born 18 March 2006) is an English professional footballer who plays for EFL Championship club Bristol City.

== Early life ==
Born in Bristol, Morrison grew up in Bedminster where he played for Bristol Inner City Football Academy before joining Bristol City under-16s in 2022.

== Club career ==
Morrison was first included among the Bristol City first team match day squad against Manchester City in the EFL Cup quarter final in February 2023. He continued to train with the first team thereafter. In March 2023 it was revealed that Morrison had signed a professional contract with Bristol City, agreeing a two-year contract until the summer of 2025.

He was a key figure in Bristol City's run to the FA Youth Cup semi-final during the 2023–24 season. He made his senior debut on 27 April 2024, in the EFL Championship against Rotherham United. He signed a new three-year contract with the club in May 2024.

On 13 January 2026, Morrison joined National League club Forest Green Rovers on loan for the rest of the season.

== International career ==
In May 2024, he was called-up to the England national under-18 football team. He made his debut as a substitute during a 4–2 win over Northern Ireland at St. George's Park.

== Career statistics ==
As of end of 2025–26 season

Appearances and goals by club, season and competition
Club	Season	League			FA Cup		EFL Cup		Other		Total	
Club	Season	Division	Apps	Goals	Apps	Goals	Apps	Goals	Apps	Goals	Apps	Goals
Bristol City	2023–24	Championship	1	0	0	0	0	0	—		1	0
Bristol City	2024–25	Championship	3	0	0	0	0	0	0	0	3	0
Bristol City	2025–26	Championship	0	0	0	0	1	0	—		1	0
Bristol City	Total		4	0	0	0	1	0	0	0	5	0
Forest Green Rovers (loan)	2025–26	National League	8	0	0	0	—		0	0	8	0
Career total			12	0	0	0	1	0	0	0	13	0
