= Radek Vítek =

Czech footballer (born 2003)

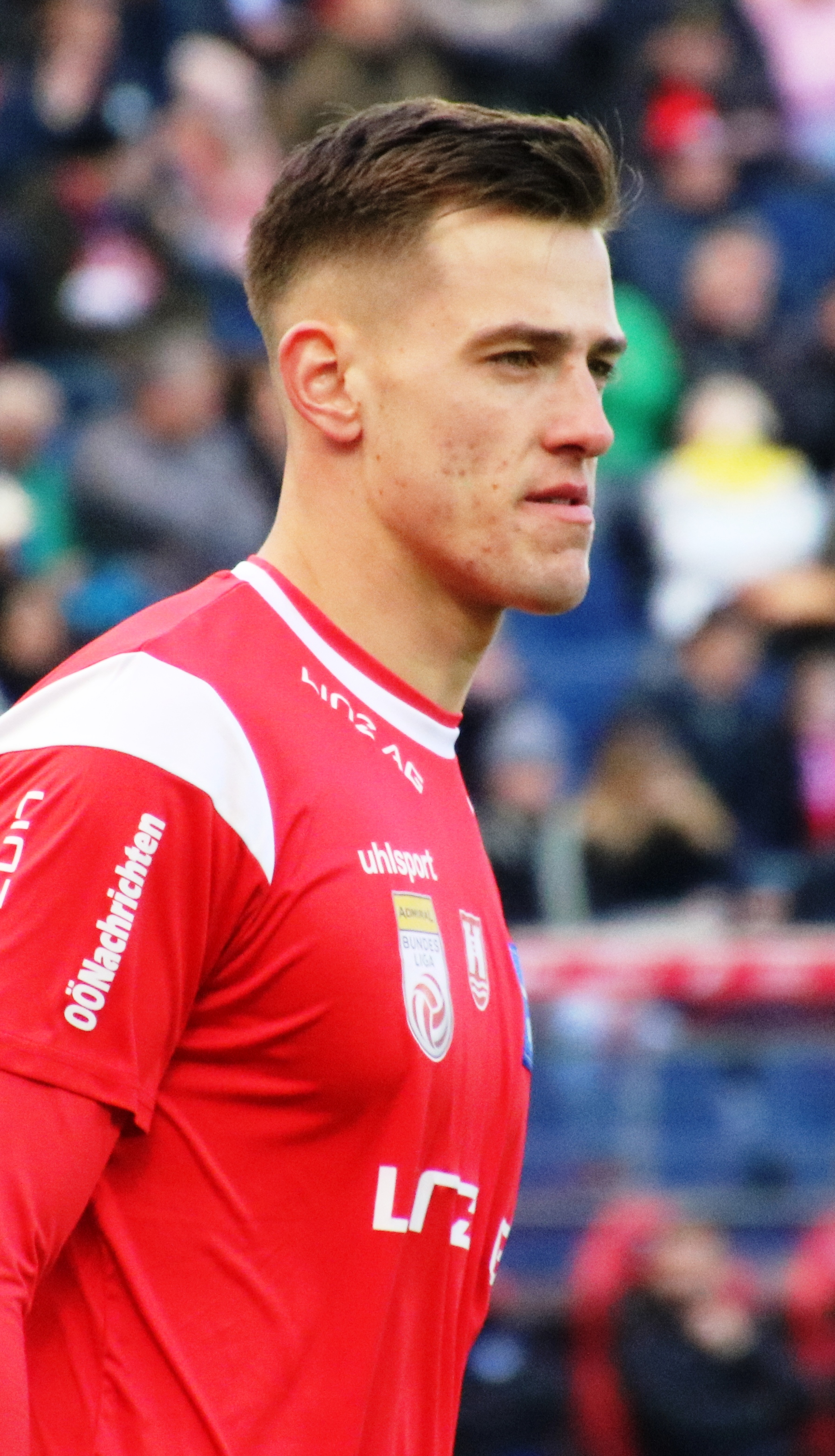
- Vítek with Blau-Weiß Linz in 2025

Personal information
- Full name: Radek Vítek
- Date of birth: 24 October 2003 (age 23)
- Place of birth: Vsetín, Czech Republic
- Height: 1.98 m (6 ft 6 in)
- Position: Goalkeeper

Team information
- Current team: Middlesbrough
- Number: 1

Youth career
- –2020: Sigma Olomouc
- 2020–2024: Manchester United

Senior career*
Years	Team	Apps	(Gls)
2024–2026	Manchester United	0	(0)
2024	→ Accrington Stanley (loan)	18	(0)
2024–2025	→ Blau-Weiß Linz (loan)	26	(0)
2025–2026	→ Bristol City (loan)	41	(0)
2026–	Middlesbrough	7	(0)

International career^{‡}
2018	Czech Republic U15	1	(0)
2019	Czech Republic U17	2	(0)
2021	Czech Republic U19	1	(0)
2023–2024	Czech Republic U20	3	(0)
- * Club domestic league appearances and goals as of 20:00, 16 September 2026 (UTC) ‡ National team caps and goals as of 21:38, 16 August 2025 (UTC)

Radek Vítek (born 24 October 2003) is a Czech professional footballer who plays as a goalkeeper for EFL Championship club Middlesbrough.

Having started as a youth player in his native Czech Republic, Vítek has played professional football in Austria as well as England. He played youth international football for the Czech Republic up to under-20 level.

== Club career ==
Born in Vsetín, Czech Republic, Vítek began his football career at Czech club Sigma Olomouc and progressed through the club's youth system. In April 2018, he played for Sigma Olomouc in Vlastislav Mareček’s memorial tournament and was named the Best Goalkeeper of the tournament. On 7 December 2018, Vítek signed a scholarship with the club, keeping him until 2021. Aged 16, he then played for the club's under-19 team.

=== Manchester United ===
His performances attracted attention from Southampton, who gave him a trial. It was announced by Sigma Olomouc that Vítek would be moving to Premier League side Manchester United in the summer of 2020. On 1 July 2020, he joined Manchester United from Sigma Olomouc.

He made his Manchester United's U18 team, starting the whole game, in a 2–1 win against Blackburn Rovers U18 on 19 September 2020. Vítek played important roles for the U18 team, helping the team beat rivals, such as, Liverpool U18, Manchester City U18 and Middlesbrough U18. He made twelve appearances in all competitions at the end of the 2020–21 season.

The start of the 2021–22 season saw Vítek play for Manchester United's U18 team. He then played five out of the six matches of the UEFA Youth League, which saw the team through to the knockout stage. Vítek then played for the club's U23 side, playing his first match, in a 6–0 loss against West Ham United's U23 team on 23 October 2021. He was part of Manchester United's U18 team that won the FA Youth Cup.Vítek also appeared twice as an unused substitute bench in the club's first team during the 2021–22 season.

In the 2022–23 season, Vítek was promoted to Manchester United's U21 team. He played his first match of the EFL Trophy, losing 2–1 against Carlisle United on 31 August 2022. Vítek was featured for the under-21 side throughout the 2022–23 season.

In the 2023–24 season, Vítek was called up to Manchester United's first team squad for the pre–season tour. He played his first match in the club's pre–season, coming on as a second-half substitute for Nathan Bishop, in a 3–1 loss against Wrexham on 26 July 2023. In the EFL Trophy match against Bolton Wanderers on 26 September 2023, Vítek was in goal when he conceded eight times, in a 8–1 loss. Vítek appeared three times in the first team as an unused substitute, twice in the UEFA Champions League and once in the league.

Vítek appeared in Manchester United's pre-season tour, starting the whole game, in a 1–0 loss against Rosenberg on 15 July 2024. After the match, he said: "We are disappointed as I feel like we should always aim for a win, the manager said we don't play friendlies as it is in our DNA. We should demand more. It is really good that the young lads are getting the opportunity as when you step on the field you have to show yourself. It is a big opportunity in front of a lot of people that are watching you. You have to demand the best from yourself. It is an amazing feeling as the fans have been amazing. Lots of them at our hotel, even in the stadium the crowd was amazing: a full stadium of Red shirts." Following his loan spell at Bristol City came to an end, Vítek was called up to the Manchester United's squad for the pre-season. He appeared in Manchester United's pre-season tour, starting the whole game, in a 5–0 win against Rosenberg on 24 July 2026. After the match, manager Michael Carrick praised Vítek's performance for keeping a clean sheet.

==== Loan spell at Accrington Stanley ====
On 25 January 2024, Vítek joined Accrington Stanley on loan until the end of the season. On 27 January 2024, he made his Football League debut starting against Forest Green Rovers and keeping a clean sheet in a 1–0 win. In a follow–up match against Grimsby Town, Vítek kept his second clean sheet, in a 0–0 draw. After the match, his performance was praised by manager John Coleman for keeping another clean sheet and his integration to the club's squad. Since joining Accrington Stanley, Vítek quickly became a first-choice goalkeeper. After returning to his parent club on 30 April 2024, he made a total of 18 league appearances for Accrington Stanley during his time at the club.

==== Loan spell at FC Blau-Weiß Linz ====
On 21 August 2024, Vítek joined Austrian Bundesliga club Blau-Weiß Linz on a season-long loan. He made his debut for the club, starting the whole game and kept his first clean sheet, in a 3–0 win against Rapid Wien on 25 August 2024. After the match, Vítek was named Kicker's Team of the Round. However, he missed a month of action after injuring his cruciate ligament in September 2024. On 19 October 2024, Vítek made his return from injury and started the whole game, in a 1–0 loss against Wolfsberger AC. Since returning from injury, he regained his first-choice goalkeeper role at FC Blau-Weiß Linz.

In a match against LASK on 9 February 2025, Vítek provided a number of saves, including one from Christoph Lang and kept a clean sheet, in a 0–0 draw. After the match, he was named Kicker's Team of the Round for the second time. At the end of the 2024–25 season, Vítek made 26 league appearances for BW Linz, during which time he kept six clean sheets. Vítek featured in the Kicker Team of the Round on four more occasions.

==== Loan Spell at Bristol City ====
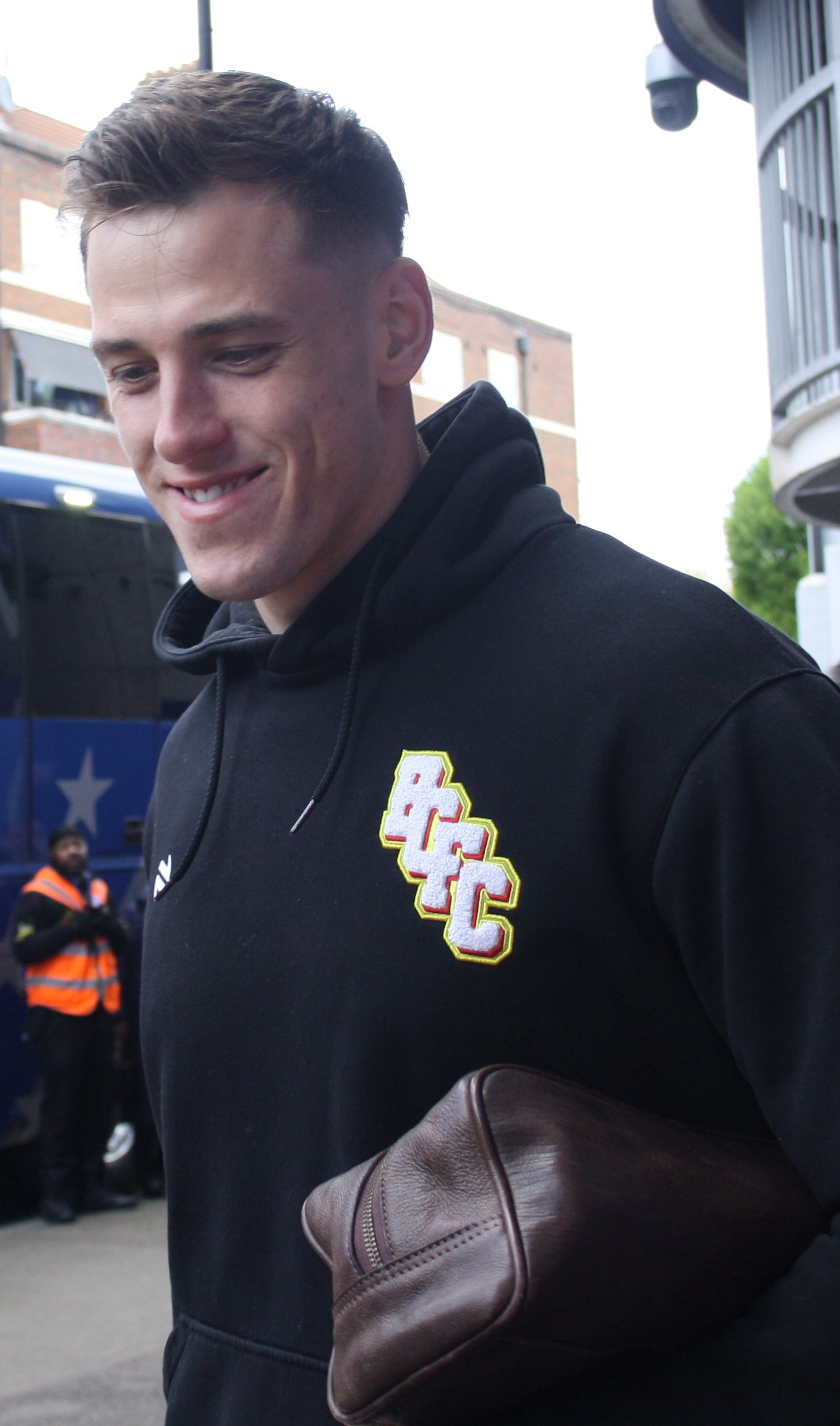
Vítek signing autographs after Bristol City’s match against Queens Park Rangers on 11 April 2026.

On 28 July 2025, Vítek signed a new contract with Manchester United until 2028 and joined EFL Championship club Bristol City on a season-long loan deal. Upon joining the club, he was given a number 23 shirt. Vítek made his debut for the club in a Championship match away against Sheffield United, which finished 4–1 to the visitors. He played all four of City's opening league matches, conceding four goals in total. For his performance, Vítek was named Bristol City's Player of the Month for August by the club's supporters. Since joining Bristol City, he quickly became the club's first-choice goalkeeper being preferred over Max O'Leary and Joe Lumley. Vítek also became fan favourite among Bristol City supporters and given a nickname, The Wall.

In a match against Norwich City on 14 October 2025, Vítek produced a number of saves from Josh Sargent and Emiliano Marcondes to keep a clean sheet, in a 1–0 win. After the match, local newspaper Bristol Post praised his performance. In a match against Stoke City on 1 November 2025, however, he made a mistake for allowing Divin Mubama to score in the 22nd minute, in a 5–1 loss. In a match against Wrexham on 24 November 2025, Vítek scored an own goal in the 74th minute when "a deep corner into the back of his own net after being curled directly onto the inside of the far post", as Bristol City loss 2–0. However, he suffered a knee injury while training and was out for five matches.

But on 17 January 2026, Vítek made his return to the starting line–up and kept a clean sheet, in a 0–0 draw against Oxford United. After the match, local newspaper Bristol Post praised his return, saying he was "the best performer of the day”. In a follow–up match against Ipswich Town, Vítek "produced an extraordinary stop to keep Bristol City in contention, instinctively stretching out a hand to divert the ball over the bar whilst grounded", including one that described by Bristol Post as "save of the season", as the club loss 2–0. Since returning from injury, he regained his first-choice goalkeeper role for the club, especially after O’Leary's departure. At the end of the 2025–26 season, Vítek made forty–one appearances in all competitions.

Following this, he returned to his parent club. On 3 May 2026, Vítek was awarded Bristol City's Player of the Year, the Supporters Club & Trust's Men's Young Player of the Year and Players’ Player of the Year award.

=== Middlesbrough ===
On 8 August 2026, Vítek signed for EFL Championship club Middlesbrough on a permanent deal. The transfer fee was worth £7m in guaranteed payments for Vitek, while that fee could double depending on performance-related add-ons.

He made his debut for the club, starting the whole game, in a 2-1 win against Lincoln City in the opening game of the season. Since joining Middlesbrough, Vítek quickly established himself as the club's first-choice goalkeeper.

== International career ==
Vítek played youth international football for the Czech Republic at under-15, under-17, under-19 and under-20 levels. In April 2018, he was called up to Czech Republic under-15 side. Vítek made his debut (and only) appearance for the under-15 side, in a 2–1 loss against Republic of Ireland under-15 on 5 April 2018. In July 2019, Vítek was called up to the Czech Republic under-17 squad for the first time. In August 2021, Vítek was called up to Czech Republic under-19 squad for the first time. He made his debut (and only) appearance for the under-19 side, in a 3–3 draw against Belgium under-17 side on 5 September 2021.

In August 2023, Vítek was called up to Czech Republic under-20 squad for the first time. He made his debut for the under-20 side, in a 1–0 loss against Italy under-20 on 11 September 2023. Vítek went on to make two more appearances for Czech Republic U20 side.

== Career statistics ==
As of match played 2 September 2026

Appearances and goals by club, season and competition
Club	Season	League			National cup (Note: Includes Austrian Cup)		League cup		Other		Total	
Club	Season	Division	Apps	Goals	Apps	Goals	Apps	Goals	Apps	Goals	Apps	Goals
Manchester United U21	2022–23	—			—		—		1 (Note: Appearance in EFL Trophy)	0	1	0
Manchester United U21	2023–24	—			—		—		1	0	1	0
Manchester United U21	Total		0	0	0	0	0	0	2	0	2	0
Manchester United	2023–24	Premier League	0	0	0	0	0	0	0	0	0	0
Manchester United	2024–25	Premier League	0	0	0	0	0	0	0	0	0	0
Manchester United	2025–26	Premier League	0	0	0	0	0	0	—		0	0
Manchester United	Total		0	0	0	0	0	0	0	0	0	0
Accrington Stanley (loan)	2023–24	EFL League Two	18	0	—		—		—		18	0
Blau-Weiß Linz (loan)	2024–25	Austrian Bundesliga	26	0	2	0	—		—		28	0
Bristol City (loan)	2025–26	EFL Championship	41	0	0	0	0	0	—		41	0
Middlesbrough	2026-27	EFL Championship	4	0	0	0	0	0	—		4	0
Career total			89	0	2	0	0	0	2	0	93	0

== Honours ==
Manchester United U18

- FA Youth Cup: 2021–22

=== Individual ===
- Bristol City Player of the Year: 2025–26
