= Mahlon DeLong =

American neurologist (1938–2024)

- Born: March 17, 1938; Des Moines, Iowa, U.S.
- Died: May 17, 2024 (aged 86); Atlanta, Georgia, U.S.
- Education: Stanford University; Harvard Medical School
- Scientific career
- Workplaces: Emory University; Johns Hopkins University

Mahlon R. DeLong (March 17, 1938 in Des Moines – May 17, 2024 in Atlanta) was an American neurologist and professor at the Medical School of Emory University. His research has advanced the understanding and treatment of Parkinson's disease, dystonia, tremor and other neurological movement disorders.

DeLong attended Stanford University (AB 1962), Harvard Medical School (MD 1966), completed his internship at Boston City Hospital and his residency training at Johns Hopkins Hospital in Baltimore, and subsequently joined the faculty of Johns Hopkins University. Since 1990, he has been a member of the faculty at Emory University, where he has been the William Patterson Timmie Professor of Neurology since 1993, and launched its deep brain stimulation (DBS) clinic. He is a member of the Dana Alliance for Brain Initiative.

In 1968, DeLong began five years of research training in the laboratory of Edward Evarts at the National Institutes of Health in Bethesda, Maryland. In 1971, he and Russell T. Richardson did experiments with monkeys to find out first groups of neurons (nucleus basalis), which are involved in the pathogenesis conditioned learning and they revealed the role played by the neurotransmitter acetylcholine.

At the NIH, DeLong recorded the reactions of single brain cells in a part of the brain called the basal ganglia. At that time, it was known that the basal ganglia were involved in movement, and were the part of the brain most significantly affected in Parkinson’s disease. However, little was known about how the basal ganglia affected movement, or how disease of the basal ganglia caused the movement disorders seen in Parkinson's disease. In meticulous experiments over several years, DeLong measured the firing of specific cells in the basal ganglia of awake monkeys when they performed specific trained movements.

Based on this work, and the work of others, DeLong and his colleagues identified a series of separate circuits that connect the basal ganglia with the cerebral cortex and thalamus. These circuits allow parallel processing of emotions, thoughts, and movement.

In the 1980s, DeLong and his colleagues began to study monkeys with an experimentally-induced disease much like Parkinson’s disease. He discovered that neurons in a part of the basal ganglia called the subthalamic nucleus were firing excessively, and that destroying (ablating) the subthalamic nucleus greatly improved the symptoms.

Shortly thereafter, neurosurgeon Alim-Louis Benabid discovered that the same improvement could be achieved by placing a wire into the subthalamic nucleus, connecting it to a battery and delivering an adjustable high-frequency stimulation to the tip of the wire—the technique, DBS, is used to improve symptoms and the quality of life in patients with Parkinson’s disease who are not responding adequately to pharmacologic treatment. Ablation or deep brain stimulation of the subthalamic nucleus has transformed the lives of many people with Parkinson’s disease.

For his work in understanding the circuits connecting the basal ganglia to other parts of the brain, and in applying that knowledge to develop a technique that has eased the suffering of many people with Parkinson's disease, DeLong was honored in 2014 with the Breakthrough Prize in Life Sciences and, as co-recipient with Benabid, the Lasker-DeBakey Clinical Medical Research Award.
