= Jack Vitek =

- Born: 1950 (age 75–76)

Academic work
- Discipline: Journalism
- Institutions: Edgewood College

Jack Vitek is the journalism professor in the English department at Edgewood College. Vitek has worked at the Wall Street Journal, The Washington Daily News, Newsday, the Palm Beach Post and Outdoor Life magazine. He is the advisor for Edgewood College's student newspaper, On the Edge, which recently had finalist reporters in two categories in the AP Collegiate Story of the Year contest.

He co-authored (with Jerry Oppenheimer) the 1986 biography Idol Rock Hudson: The True Story of an American Film Hero. The biography generated controversy because it reported that Hudson continued to have unprotected sex with other men after he had been diagnosed with AIDS. Their version of his life story was supported by a lawsuit won by one of Hudson's lovers who was exposed to AIDS.

His latest work is The Godfather of Tabloid: Generoso Pope Jr. and the National Enquirer, published August 1, 2008, by University Press of Kentucky.
