= Vít Christov =

Czech ice hockey player (born 1996)

- Born: August 30, 1996 (age 28); Czech Republic
- Height: 5 ft 10 in (178 cm)
- Weight: 168 lb (76 kg; 12 st 0 lb)
- Position: Forward
- Shoots: Left
- Maxa liga team: HC RT TORAX Poruba 2011
- Playing career: 2014–present

Vít Christov (born August 30, 1996) is a Czech professional ice hockey player. He is currently playing for HC RT TORAX Poruba 2011 of the Maxa liga.

Christov made his Czech Extraliga debut playing with HC Oceláři Třinec during the 2014-15 Czech Extraliga season.

In seasons 2015/2016, 2016/2017, 2017/2018, 2018/2019, 2021/2022, starting in team HC Frýdek-Místek (this team in season 2015/2016 advanced to the WSM Liga (now called Maxa Liga).

In seasons 2019/2020, 2020/2021 start in Czech Extraliga for, the team HC Motor České Budějovice.

And from the 2022/2023 season, he plays for the team HC Torax Poruba2011.
