= Gerhard Struber =

Austrian football manager

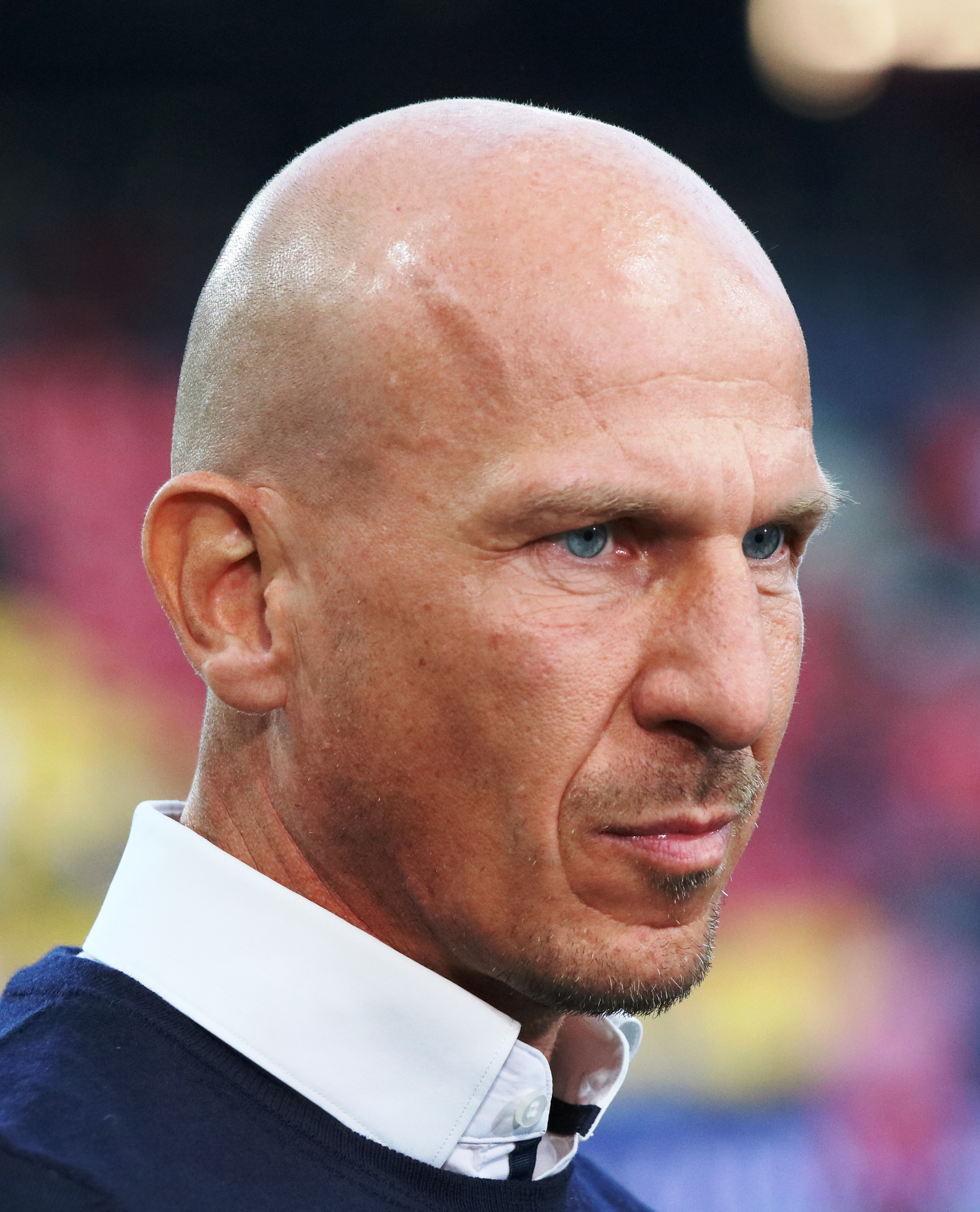
- Struber in 2023

Personal information
- Full name: Gerhard Struber
- Date of birth: 24 January 1977 (age 49)
- Place of birth: Kuchl, Austria
- Height: 1.72 m (5 ft 8 in)
- Position: Midfielder

Youth career
- 1985–1991: SV Kuchl
- 1991–1995: SV Austria Salzburg

Senior career*
Years	Team	Apps	(Gls)
1995–2001	SV Austria Salzburg	50	(3)
1995	→ FC Puch (loan)	1	(0)
1998	→ Admira Wacker (loan)	4	(1)
2000	→ SV Wörgl (loan)	29	(9)
2001	BSV Bad Bleiberg	9	(2)
2001–2003	LASK	30	(0)
2003–2004	SC Schwanenstadt	44	(4)
2004–2005	FC Hallein 04		
2005–2008	SV Friedburg		
2008	SC Leogang		
2008	Red Bull Salzburg		
Total		167	(19)

International career
1996–1998	Austria U21	3	(1)

Managerial career
- 2019: Wolfsberger AC
- 2019–2020: Barnsley
- 2020–2023: New York Red Bulls
- 2023–2024: Red Bull Salzburg
- 2024–2025: 1. FC Köln
- 2025–2026: Bristol City
- * Club domestic league appearances and goals

Gerhard Struber (born 24 January 1977) is an Austrian professional football manager and former player who was most recently the head coach of EFL Championship club Bristol City.

== Playing career ==
As a midfielder, Struber spent most of his career at SV Austria Salzburg from 1995 to 2001. He won the Austrian Bundesliga in the 1996–97 season with Salzburg and the Austrian Super Cup in 1997. Upon retiring as a footballer in 2008, Struber had played with several less prominent clubs.

== Coaching career ==
=== Early career ===
After working two years as trainer for software systems, then eight years in sales and management positions at an insurance company, Struber quit his job to focus on coaching football teams in 2014. He already worked part time as co-trainer in the academy of Red Bull Salzburg from mid-2007 to mid-2010, and as coach of fourth division side SV Kuchl for 20 months. In 2014, Struber started working full time as under-15 coach at the Red Bull Salzburg academy.

=== FC Liefering ===
In June 2017, he became coach of FC Liefering alongside Janusz Góra. Struber was also coach of the Red Bull Salzburg team in the 2017–18 UEFA Youth League, where the defending champions were eliminated in the round of 16. In the 2018–19 season, he took full charge of Liefering, but left in January to focus on taking his UEFA Pro Licence.

=== Wolfsberger AC ===
Struber became the new manager of Wolfsberger AC for the 2019–20 season. Wolfsberg was ranked in third place after 14 games, same as the season before, and gathered four points out of four games in the 2019–20 UEFA Europa League before Struber left the club.

=== Barnsley ===
On 20 November 2019, Struber was appointed as manager of EFL Championship side Barnsley, penning a two-year deal. He succeeded Daniel Stendel. Barnsley were bottom of the league, seven points away from safety. They were consigned to the relegation zone for most of the 2019–20 campaign. With two stoppage time wins against Nottingham Forest and Brentford at the end of the season, Struber guided Barnsley to securing Championship football for a second successive season. It was helped by Wigan Athletic falling into administration and getting a 12 points deduction. For the 2020–21 season Struber strived to get a stable team, as he had ambitious goals for the future of the club.

=== New York Red Bulls ===
On 6 October 2020, Struber was appointed as head coach of Major League Soccer side New York Red Bulls. The Red Bulls paid an undisclosed amount to his former club Barnsley in order to sign him. Struber made his coaching debut for the club in a 3–2 MLS Cup Playoffs loss against the Columbus Crew on 21 November. Under his reign, the New York Red Bulls made the playoffs two seasons in a row. Struber faced heavy scrutiny as the New York Red Bulls started the 2023 season with one win, four losses, and six draws in the first eleven games, as well as keeping Dante Vanzeir in a match against the San Jose Earthquakes after the player used a racial slur against Earthquakes player Jeremy Ebobisse. Struber said that he should have removed Dante Vanzeir immediately, but was not aware of the full situation during the game. Struber departed the club in May 2023.

=== Red Bull Salzburg ===
On 31 July 2023, Struber became the head coach of Red Bull Salzburg on a two-year contract. On 14 March 2024, Struber was dismissed from Red Bull Salzburg after a loss to Sturm Graz.

=== 1. FC Köln ===
He was named the new head coach of 1. FC Köln on 12 June 2024. In May 2025, he was dismissed.

=== Bristol City ===
On 19 June 2025 he was named the new head coach of Bristol City on a three-year contract until 2028.

On 27 March 2026, Struber was sacked with the club sitting in 16th position.

== Managerial statistics ==
As of match played 21 March 2026

Managerial record by team and tenure
Team	From	To	Record					Ref.
Team	From	To	P	W	D	L	Win %	Ref.
FC Liefering	1 July 2018	4 January 2019	15	6	1	8	40.0	
Wolfsberger AC	1 July 2019	19 November 2019	21	11	4	6	52.4	
Barnsley	19 November 2019	6 October 2020	39	14	8	17	35.9	
New York Red Bulls	6 October 2020	8 May 2023	87	33	23	31	37.9	
Red Bull Salzburg	31 July 2023	15 April 2024	34	20	6	8	58.8	
1. FC Köln	12 June 2024	5 May 2025	36	19	7	10	52.8	
Bristol City	19 June 2025	27 March 2026	43	16	9	18	37.2	
Total			275	119	58	98	43.3	

== Honours ==
SV Austria Salzburg

- Austrian Football Bundesliga: 1996–97
- Austrian Super Cup: 1997
