= 2026–27 Weston-super-Mare A.F.C. season =

Football team season

Weston-super-Mare
2026–27 season
- President: Dennis Usher
- Chairman: Paul Bliss
- Manager: Scott Rogers
- Stadium: Woodspring Stadium
- National League South: 2nd
- FA cup: Second qualifying round replay
- Francis Hillier Premier Cup: Second Round
- Top goalscorer: League: Brad Ash (4); All: Brad Ash (7)
- Highest home attendance: 1,596 v. Dagenham; National League South, 12 September 2026
- Lowest home attendance: 166 v. Mendip Broadwalk; Francis Hillier Premier Cup, 6 October 2026
- Biggest win: 13–0 v. Mendip Broadwalk (H); Francis Hillier Premier Cup, 6 October 2026
- Biggest defeat: 1-6 v. Ebbsfleet United (A); National League South, 17 October 2026
Home colours	Away colours	Third colours

The 2026–27 season is Weston-super-Mare's 130th overall in English football and their 4th consecutive season in the National League South. In addition to the domestic league, the club also participated in the FA Cup and currently participates in the Francis Hillier Premier Cup.

== Coaching staff ==
Updated 23 September 2026

This season is Scott Rogers's first full season as first-team manager after being appointed in October 2025 after the departure of previous manager Scott Bartlett.

Position	Name
Manager	(England) Scott Rogers
Assistant Manager	(England) Gary Warren
Technical Director	(England) Adie Britton
Goalkeeping Coach	(England) Steve Laker
Sports Therapist	(England) Taylor Cornish
Massage Therapist	(England) Amy Callow
Head Analyst	(England) David Reid-Sinclair

== Current squad ==
Updated 29 September 2026

Note: Flags indicate national team as defined under FIFA eligibility rules; some limited exceptions apply. Players may hold more than one non-FIFA nationality.

No.	Pos.	Nation	Player
1	GK	ENG	Max Harris
2	DF	NIR	Michael Smith
4	MF	ENG	Jacob Jagger Cane
5	DF	WAL	Emlyn Lewis (captain)
6	DF	ENG	Sam Avery
7	MF	ENG	Luke Coulson (vice-captain)
8	MF	ENG	James Dodd
9	FW	ENG	Louis Britton
10	FW	ENG	Ollie Hulbert
11	MF	ENG	Will Dawes
12	DF	ENG	Jason Pope
13	GK	ENG	Jakob Glover

No.	Pos.	Nation	Player
14	FW	ENG	Brad Ash
16	MF	ENG	Louie Derrick (on loan from Bristol City)
18	MF	ENG	Caden Voice (on loan from Cardiff City)
20	FW	ENG	Luke Skinner (on loan from Bristol City)
21	DF	ENG	Dan Martin
22	MF	ENG	George Robesten
24	DF	IRL	Sean Long
26	MF	ENG	Liam Sercombe
27	MF	ENG	Scot Bennett
30	MF	WAL	Will Jenkins-Davies
—	MF	ENG	James Watts-Barciela
—	MF	WAL	Josh Salmon

Out on loan

Note: Flags indicate national team as defined under FIFA eligibility rules; some limited exceptions apply. Players may hold more than one non-FIFA nationality.

No.	Pos.	Nation	Player
15	MF	ENG	Calum Hewlett (on loan at Bristol Manor Farm)
17	MF	ENG	Owen Johnson (dual-registered with Exmouth Town)
19	DF	ENG	Archie Taylor (on loan at Yate Town)
23	FW	ENG	Ricardo Thompson (on loan at Mangotsfield United)
—	DF	ITA	Faith Ikpeama (dual-registered with Thornbury Town)
—	MF	ENG	Jay Murray (on loan at Taunton Town)
—	MF	ENG	Josh Oliver (dual-registered with Thornbury Town)
—	FW	ENG	Leighton Green (dual-registered with Bovey Tracey)

== Competitions ==
=== Overall record ===
Competition	First match	Last match	Starting round	Record							
Competition	First match	Last match	Starting round	Pld	W	D	L	GF	GA	GD	Win %
National League South	8 August 2026	TBD	Matchday 1	12	5	3	4	20	17	+3	41.67
FA Cup	19 September 2026	22 September 2026	Second Qualifying Round	2	0	2	0	2	2	+0	0.00
Francis Hillier Premier Cup	6 October 2026	TBD	First Round	1	1	0	0	13	0	+13	100.00
Total				15	6	5	4	35	19	+16	40.00

Last updated: 17 October 2026
Source: Weston-super-Mare A.F.C

=== National League South ===
==== League table ====
Pos	Team	Pld	W	D	L	GF	GA	GD	Pts	Promotion, qualification or relegation
6	Tonbridge Angels	12	6	2	4	21	11	+10	20	Qualification for the National League South play-off quarter-finals
7	Dagenham & Redbridge	12	6	2	4	10	9	+1	20	Qualification for the National League South play-off quarter-finals
8	Weston-super-Mare	12	5	3	4	20	17	+3	18	
9	Dover Athletic	11	5	3	3	18	17	+1	18	
10	Dorking Wanderers	11	4	5	2	23	17	+6	17	

Updated to match(es) played on 17 October 2026. Source: National League official site
Rules for classification: 1) Points; 2) Goal difference; 3) Number of goals scored; 4) Number of matches won; 5) Head-to-head results

==== Results summary ====
Overall								Home						Away					
Pld	W	D	L	GF	GA	GD	Pts	W	D	L	GF	GA	GD	W	D	L	GF	GA	GD
12	5	3	4	20	17	+3	18	4	2	1	14	6	+8	1	1	3	6	11	−5

Last updated: 10 October 2026.
Source: [https://wsmafc.co.uk/results/men/

==== Matches ====
The league fixtures were released on 10 July 2026.

Win Draw Loss Fixtures

8 August 2026 1	Weston-super-Mare	3-0	Chesham United	Weston-super-Mare
15:00 BST	Cane 7'; Derrick 76'; Britton 90+7'	Report		Stadium: Optima Stadium; Attendance: 1,004

15 August 2026 2	Weston-super-Mare	3-0	Hampton and Richmond	Weston-super-Mare
15:00 BST	Hulbert 5'; Hulbert (yellow card) 36'; Bennett 81'; Derrick (yellow card) 86'; Pope (yellow card) 89'; Coulson 90+7'	Report		Stadium: Optima Stadium; Attendance: 937

18 August 2026 3	Torquay United F.C.	0-0	Weston-super-Mare	Torquay
19:45 BST		Report		Stadium: Plainmoor; Attendance: 1,436

22 August 2026 4	Weston-super-Mare	2-3	Dover Athletic	Weston-super-Mare
15:00 BST	Britton 38', 56'	Report	Sheriff 30'; Williams 76'; Andrews 90+1'	Stadium: Optima Stadium; Attendance: 1,057

29 August 2026 5	Hemel Hempstead Town F.C.	1-3	Weston-super-Mare	Hemel Hempstead
15:00 BST	Campbell 16'	Report	Britton 74'; Ash 77', 83'	Stadium: Focus Community Arena; Attendance: 471

31 August 2026 6	Weston-super-Mare	1-1	Chelmsford	Weston-super-Mare
15:00 BST	Derrick 61'	Report	Alexander 64'	Stadium: Optima Stadium; Attendance: 1,254

5 September 2026 7	Maidstone United F.C.	1-0	Weston-super-Mare	Maidstone
15:00 BST	Charles 49'	Report		Stadium: Gallagher Stadium; Attendance: 2,007

8 September 2026 8	Weston-super-Mare	3-1	A.F.C. Totton	Weston-super-Mare
19:45 BST	Ash 35', 42'; Cane 56'	Report	Hallett 83'; Tanner (yellow card) 90+2'	Stadium: Optima Stadium; Attendance: 855

12 September 2026 9	Weston-super-Mare	1-0	Dagenham and Redbridge	Weston-super-Mare
15:00 BST	Hulbert 89'	Report		Stadium: Optima Stadium; Attendance: 1,596

26 September 2026 10	Farnham Town F.C.	3-2	Weston-super-Mare	Farnham
15:00 BST	Dean 6'; Sanders 18', 35'	Report	Derrick 16'; Cane 89'	Stadium: The Memorial Ground; Attendance: 1,316

10 October 2026 11	Weston-super-Mare	1-1	Folkestone Invicta	Weston-super-Mare
15:00 BST	Coulson 58'	Report	Kelman 8'	Stadium: Optima Stadium; Attendance: 1,118

17 October 2026 12	Ebbsfleet United	6-1	Weston-super-Mare	Northfleet
15:00 BST	Appiah 8', 19', 23'; Kennedy 41'; Ogunleye 49'; Seaman 79'	Report	Hulbert 83'; Smith (red card) 88'	Stadium: Kuflink Stadium; Attendance: 1,092

24 October 2026 13	Weston-super-Mare	v	Billericay Town	Weston-super-Mare
15:00 BST		Report		Stadium: Optima Stadium

28 October 2026 14	Farnborough	v	Weston-super-Mare	Farnborough
19:45 GMT		Report		Stadium: Saunders Transport Community Stadium

31 October 2026 15	Dorking Wanderers	v	Weston-super-Mare	Dorking
15:00 GMT		Report		Stadium: Meadowbank Stadium

7 November 2026 16	Weston-super-Mare	v	Braintree Town	Weston-super-Mare
15:00 GMT		Report		Stadium: Optima Stadium

21 November 2026 17	Tonbridge Angels	v	Weston-super-Mare	Tonbridge
15:00 GMT		Report		Stadium: Yeomans Community Stadium

24 November 2026 18	Weston-super-Mare	v	Walton and Hersham	Weston-super-Mare
19:45 GMT		Report		Stadium: Optima Stadium

28 November 2026 19	Weston-super-Mare	v	Maidenhead United	Weston-super-Mare
15:00 GMT		Report		Stadium: Optima Stadium

5 December 2026 20	Horsham	v	Weston-super-Mare	Horsham
15:00 GMT		Report		Stadium: Fusion Aviation Community Stadium

8 December 2026 21	Chesham United	v	Weston-super-Mare	Chesham
19:45 GMT		Report		Stadium: The Meadow

=== FA Cup ===
Weston-super-Mare entered the FA Cup during the second qualifying round as part of the National League South. They were drawn to Southern League Premier Division South side Wimborne Town, at step 3 of the National League System on 7 September 2026. Following a draw, they were to play Wimborne Town again in a replay, where they drew yet again after 90 minutes, but lost on penalties.

Win Draw Loss Fixtures

19 September 2026 Second Round Qualifying	Weston-super-Mare	1-1	Wimborne Town	Weston-super-Mare
10:00 BST	Skinner 18'	Report	Fletcher 27'	Stadium: Optima Stadium; Attendance: 487

22 September 2026 Second Round Qualifying Replay	Wimborne Town	1-1 (4-3 p)	Weston-super-Mare	Wimborne
19:30 BST	Villa 109'	Report	Robeston 94'	Stadium: Wyatt Homes Stadium; Attendance: 540
	Penalties
	Wooding (penalty scored); Smith (penalty scored); Walker (penalty missed); Fletcher (penalty scored); Villa (penalty scored)		(penalty scored) Coulson; (penalty missed) Britton; (penalty scored) Dawes; (penalty scored) Derrick; (penalty missed) Bennett

=== Francis Hillier Premier Cup ===
As part of their affiliation with the Somerset County Football Association, Weston-super-Mare will participate in the 2026-27 Francis Hillier Premier Cup, the knockout county cup competition run by the Association. The club was drawn to Western League Division One side Mendip Broadwalk F.C., at step 6 of the National League System on 7 August 2026, to be played on 22 September 2026. However, due to the FA Cup Second Qualifying Round Replay against Wimborne Town, the match was rearranged to 6 October 2026. On 4 October 2026, due to Mendip Broadwalk's pitch failing an inspection, the match was reversed to take place at Optima Stadium.

Win Draw Loss Fixtures

6 October 2026 First Round	Weston-super-Mare	13-0	Mendip Broadwalk	Weston-super-Mare
19:45 BST	Dawes 16'; Britton 24', 35', 48'; Coulson 28', 55'; Johnson 30'; Hulbert 50', 63'; Ash 68', 85', 88'; Voice 90'	Report		Stadium: Optima Stadium; Attendance: 166
