= 2015–16 Exeter City F.C. season =

Exeter City
2015–16 season
- Owner: Exeter City Supporters' Trust
- Chairman: Julian Tagg
- Manager: Paul Tisdale
- Stadium: St James Park
- League Two: 14th
- FA Cup: Third round (Eliminated by Liverpool)
- League Cup: Second round (Eliminated by Sunderland)
- League Trophy: Second round (Eliminated by Plymouth)
- Top goalscorer: League: Jayden Stockley (10); All: Jayden Stockley (10)
- Highest home attendance: 7,177 (2–1 vs Plymouth Argyle, 2 Apr 16)
- Lowest home attendance: 2,323 (2–0 vs Portsmouth, 1 Sep 15)
- Average home league attendance: 4,008

The 2015–16 season was Exeter City's 114th year in existence and their fourth consecutive season in League Two. Along with competing in League Two, the club also participated in the FA Cup, League Cup and League Trophy. The season covered the period from 1 July 2015 to 30 June 2016.

== Transfers ==
=== Transfers in ===
Date from	Position	Nationality	Name	From	Fee	Ref.
1 July 2015	CM	ENG	Alex Byrne	Academy	Trainee	
1 July 2015	RW	ENG	Joe Charles	Academy	Trainee	
1 July 2015	CF	ENG	Cameron Gill	Academy	Trainee	
1 July 2015	LW	ENG	Lee Holmes	Preston North End	Free transfer	
1 July 2015	GK	AUT	Bobby Olejnik	Peterborough United	Free transfer	
1 July 2015	RM	ENG	Emmanuel Oyeleke	Brentford	Free transfer	
1 July 2015	DF	ENG	Josh Read	Academy	Trainee	
3 July 2015	CB	WAL	Troy Brown	Cheltenham Town	Free transfer	
30 July 2015	CF	ENG	Will Hoskins	Oxford United	Free transfer	
8 August 2015	CF	IRE	Clinton Morrison	Free agent	Free transfer	
21 August 2015	RW	JAM	Joel Grant	Yeovil Town	Free transfer	
25 January 2016	CM	WAL	Jake Taylor	Reading	Free transfer	

=== Transfers out ===
Date from	Position	Nationality	Name	To	Fee	Ref.
1 July 2015	CB	ENG	Pat Baldwin	Weymouth (Note: Following Baldwin's release he joined Weymouth.)	Free transfer	
1 July 2015	CB	ENG	Scot Bennett	Notts County (Note: Following Bennett's release he joined Notts County.)	Free transfer	
1 July 2015	RM	IRL	Graham Cummins	St Johnstone (Note: Following Cummins' release he joined St. Johnstone.)	Free transfer	
1 July 2015	CM	ENG	Liam Sercombe	Oxford United (Note: Following Sercombe's release he joined Oxford United.)	Free transfer	
1 September 2015	CM	IRL	Jimmy Keohane	Woking	Free transfer	
1 February 2016	FW	ENG	Tom Nichols	Peterborough United	Undisclosed	

=== Loans in ===
Date from	Position	Nationality	Name	From	Date until	Ref.
11 January 2016	CF	ENG	Jayden Stockley	Bournemouth	30 June 2016	

=== Loans out ===
Date from	Position	Nationality	Name	To	Date until	Ref.
17 July 2015	CM	ENG	Alex Byrne	Weston-super-Mare	End of season	
17 July 2015	CM	ENG	Jason Pope	Weston-super-Mare	31 January 2016	
21 July 2015	LB	ENG	Connor Riley-Lowe	Truro City	End of season	
29 September 2015	CF	NIR	Jamie Reid	Truro City	23 November 2015	
22 November 2015	CF	ENG	Matt Jay	Hayes & Yeading United	End of season	
22 January 2016	CF	ENG	Cameron Gill	Weston-super-Mare	End of season	
25 February 2016	GK	GUE	James Hamon	Hayes & Yeading United	25 March 2016	

== Competitions ==
=== Pre-season friendlies ===
On 18 May 2015, Exeter City announced that Brazilian side Fluminense will bring an under-19 squad to face in a pre-season friendly on 20 July 2015. A day later Exeter City announced a second friendly against Weston-super-Mare. On 20 May 2015, Torquay United was added to the schedule. A pre-season trip to Scotland was confirmed on 21 May 2015. On 8 June 2015, a visit from AFC Bournemouth was confirmed. A friendly against Sheffield United was announced a day later. On 16 June it was announced that an Exeter City XI would play Bodmin Town.

7 July 2015 Friendly	East Fife	1–1	Exeter City	Levenmouth, Scotland
19:30 BST	Austin 89'	Report	Ribeiro 82'	Stadium: Bayview Stadium; Referee: Steven Reid

9 July 2015 Friendly	Arbroath	1–0	Exeter City	Arbroath, Scotland
19:45 BST	Hester 67'	Report		Stadium: Gayfield Park; Referee: Scott Leslie

15 July 2015 Friendly	Weston-super-Mare	1–2	Exeter City	Weston-super-Mare
19:45 BST	Grubb 63'	Report	Fisher 31'; Nichols 48'	Stadium: Woodspring Stadium; Referee: Adam Penwell

18 July 2015 Friendly	Exeter City	1–2	AFC Bournemouth	Exeter
15:00 BST	Wheeler 32'	Report	Gosling 51'; Stanislas 76'	Stadium: St James Park; Attendance: 2,125 (360 away); Referee: Lee Swabey

20 July 2015 Friendly	Exeter City	0–2	Fluminense U-19	Exeter
19:00 BST		Report	Felipe 53'; Andrey 80'	Stadium: St James Park; Attendance: 1,046; Referee: Adam Bromley

23 July 2015 Friendly	Exeter City	1–2	Sheffield United	Exeter
19:30 BST	Nichols 56'	Report	Collins 14'; Adams 80'	Stadium: St James Park; Attendance: 1,122 (192 away)

28 July 2015 Friendly	Bodmin Town	1–3	Exeter City XI	Bodmin
19:30 BST	Thornton 75'	Report	Jay 48', 52'; McCready 62'	Stadium: Priory Park

31 July 2015 Friendly	Torquay United	2–1	Exeter City	Torquay
19:30 BST	Murombedzi 21'; Lavelle-Moore 64'	Report	Nichols 2'	Stadium: Plainmoor; Attendance: 1,497 (383 away); Referee: Brett Huxtable

4 August 2015 Friendly	AFC St Austell	0–5	Exeter City XI	St Austell
19:30 BST		Report	Oyeleke 67'; Reid 69', 82' (pen.); Watkins 74', 84'	Stadium: Poltair Park; Attendance: 312

=== League Two ===
==== League table ====
Pos	Team	Pld	W	D	L	GF	GA	GD	Pts
12	Mansfield Town	46	17	13	16	61	53	+8	64
13	Wycombe Wanderers	46	17	13	16	45	44	+1	64
14	Exeter City	46	17	13	16	63	65	−2	64
15	Barnet	46	17	11	18	67	68	−1	62
16	Hartlepool United	46	15	6	25	49	72	−23	51

Updated to match(es) played on 7 May 2016. Source: BBC Sport
Rules for classification: 1) Points; 2) Goal difference; 3) Number of goals scored

==== Results summary ====
Exeter City gained 29 points at home and picked up 35 points away, adding up to 64 in total.

Overall								Home						Away					
Pld	W	D	L	GF	GA	GD	Pts	W	D	L	GF	GA	GD	W	D	L	GF	GA	GD
46	17	13	16	63	65	−2	64	6	11	6	32	33	−1	11	2	10	31	32	−1

Last updated: 7 May 2016.
Source: BBC Sport

==== Results by round ====
Exeter were a mid-table club for the entire season, spending two matchdays in the play-offs zone and falling to as low as 17th after a four-game losing streak in December and early January. For the first half of the season, the club's form was very inconsistent. From December onwards, Exeter suffered a four-game losing streak which was closely followed by a three-game winning streak. Then followed four matches without a win and a ten-match unbeaten run.

Despite this unbeaten streak, Exeter remained in fourteenth place from 20 February to 25 March. After a 2–0 win away at Crawley, Exeter rose to 11th in the table, 5 points off the play-offs zone. On 2 April 2016 and 9 April 2016, Exeter achieved a double against local rivals Plymouth Argyle and Yeovil Town, resulting in their continued rise up the table. After the latter match, Exeter were 9th, 2 places and on equal points with AFC Wimbledon and Wycombe Wanderers, although with an inferior goal difference.

This unbeaten streak, along with Exeter's realistic play-off hopes was broken by a 3–2 home loss to Mansfield Town. Exeter were mathematically confirmed to be remaining in League Two after another loss to Bristol Rovers. Exeter finished the season back in 14th position after suffering a 4–1 routing away to Luton.

Round	1	2	3	4	5	6	7	8	9	10	11	12	13	14	15	16	17	18	19	20	21	22	23	24	25	26	27	28	29	30	31	32	33	34	35	36	37	38	39	40	41	42	43	44	45	46
Ground	H	A	A	H	A	H	H	A	H	A	A	H	A	H	H	A	H	A	A	H	H	A	H	H	A	A	H	A	A	A	H	H	A	H	A	H	A	H	A	H	A	H	H	A	H	A
Result	W	L	W	D	L	W	W	L	L	W	D	D	L	W	D	L	D	W	W	D	L	L	L	L	D	W	W	W	L	L	D	L	W	D	W	D	W	D	W	W	W	D	L	L	D	L
Position	8	13	9	8	13	7	6	9	14	9	11	11	13	11	11	14	14	13	10	11	12	14	16	17	15	14	13	12	13	13	14	14	14	14	14	14	14	13	11	10	9	9	10	12	11	14

Updated to match(es) played on 7 May 2016. Source: soccerbase.com
A = Away; H = Home; W = Win; D = Draw; L = Loss

==== Matches ====
On 17 June 2015, the fixtures for the 2015–16 season were announced.

8 August 2015 1	Exeter City	3–2	Yeovil Town	Exeter
15:00 BST	Nichols 31' (pen.); Wheeler 41'; Hoskins 84'	Report	Cornick 46'; Dolan 63' (pen.)	Stadium: St James Park; Attendance: 5,659; Referee: Gavin Ward

15 August 2015 2	Northampton Town	3–0	Exeter City	Northampton
15:00 BST	Taylor 25'; Cresswell 38'; Richards 89'	Report		Stadium: Sixfields Stadium; Attendance: 4,313 (316 away); Referee: Ross Joyce

18 August 2015 3	Dagenham & Redbridge	1–2	Exeter City	Dagenham
19:45 BST	Jones 86'	Report	Harley 36'; Brown 62'	Stadium: Victoria Road; Attendance: 1,567 (320 away); Referee: Roger East

22 August 2015 4	Exeter City	0–0	York City	Exeter
15:00 BST		Report		Stadium: St James Park; Attendance: 3,139; Referee: James Linington

29 August 2015 5	AFC Wimbledon	2–1	Exeter City	Norbiton
15:00 BST	Francomb 28'; Azeez 82'	Report	Harley 33'	Stadium: Kingsmeadow; Attendance: 3,803 (467 away); Referee: Darren England

5 September 2015 6	Exeter City	4–0	Leyton Orient	Exeter
15:00 BST	Nichols 5', 56'; Nicholls 37'; Wheeler 77'	Report		Stadium: St James Park; Attendance: 3,648; Referee: Kevin Johnson

12 September 2015 7	Exeter City	1–0	Hartlepool United	Exeter
15:00 BST	Ribeiro 90+2'	Report		Stadium: St James Park; Attendance: 3,135; Referee: Andy Woolmer

19 September 2015 8	Accrington Stanley	4–2	Exeter City	Accrington
15:00 BST	Windass 33', 34'; Mingoia 61'; Kee 63'	Report	Holmes 75'; Grant 90'	Stadium: Crown Ground; Attendance: 1,403 (201 away); Referee: Richard Clark

26 September 2015 9	Exeter City	0–2	Wycombe Wanderers	Exeter
15:00 BST		Report	Jacobson 50'; Thompson 57'	Stadium: St James Park; Attendance: 3,639; Referee: Steve Martin

29 September 2015 10	Portsmouth	1–2	Exeter City	Portsmouth
19:45 BST	Roberts 90+3'	Report	Wheeler 20'; Davies 56'	Stadium: Fratton Park; Attendance: 15,822 (313 away); Referee: Nick Kinseley

3 October 2015 11	Newport County	1–1	Exeter City	Newport, Wales
15:00 BST	John-Lewis 73'	Report	Grant 61'	Stadium: Rodney Parade; Attendance: 2,870 (583 away); Referee: Dean Whitestone

11 October 2015 12	Exeter City	3–3	Stevenage	Exeter
12:15 BST	Wheeler 4', 80'; Morrison 15'	Report	Parrett 39'; Kennedy 45'; Whelpdale 90'	Stadium: St James Park; Attendance: 3,235; Referee: Roger East

17 October 2015 13	Carlisle United	1–0	Exeter City	Carlisle
15:00 BST	Gilliead 77'	Report		Stadium: Brunton Park; Attendance: 4,021 (130 away); Referee: Tony Harrington

21 October 2015 14	Exeter City	1–0	Cambridge United	Exeter
19:45 BST	Nichols 9'	Report		Stadium: St James Park; Attendance: 2,833; Referee: James Linington

24 October 2015 15	Exeter City	1–1	Notts County	Exeter
15:00 BST	Nichols 20'	Report	Noble 31'	Stadium: St James Park; Attendance: 3,429; Referee: Graham Salisbury

31 October 2015 16	Barnet	2–0	Exeter City	Canons Park, London
15:00 GMT	Brown 34' (o.g.); Clarke 54'	Report		Stadium: The Hive Stadium; Attendance: 2,105 (610 away); Referee: Ben Toner

14 November 2015 17	Exeter City	2–2	Crawley Town	Exeter
15:00 GMT	Nicholls 8'; Nichols 45'	Report	Bradley 28'; Rooney 90+2'	Stadium: St James Park; Attendance: 3,664; Referee: James Adcock

21 November 2015 18	Plymouth Argyle	1–2	Exeter City	Plymouth
15:00 GMT	Threlkeld 61'	Report	Harley 30' (pen.), 39'	Stadium: Home Park; Attendance: 14,008 (968 away); Referee: Graham Scott

24 November 2015 19	Mansfield Town	0–2	Exeter City	Mansfield
19:45 GMT		Report	Grant 6'; Holmes 41'	Stadium: Field Mill; Attendance: 2,435 (140 away); Referee: Oliver Langford

28 November 2015 20	Exeter City	1–1	Bristol Rovers	Exeter
15:00 GMT	Reid 90+4'	Report	Sinclair 83'	Stadium: St James Park; Attendance: 5,548; Referee: Phil Gibbs

19 December 2015 21	Exeter City	2–3	Luton Town	Exeter
15:00 GMT	Nichols 71'; Nicholls 82'	Report	McGeehan 30' (pen.); Green 34'; Benson 90+10'	Stadium: St James Park; Attendance: 3,777; Referee: Brendan Malone

26 December 2015 22	Oxford United	3–0	Exeter City	Oxford
15:00 GMT	Lundstram 48'; Baldock 67'; Sercombe 90'	Report		Stadium: Kassam Stadium; Attendance: 9,683 (547 away); Referee: Graham Salisbury

29 December 2015 23	Exeter City	0–2	AFC Wimbledon	Exeter
15:00 GMT		Report	Elliott 17'; Taylor 31'	Stadium: St James Park; Attendance: 5,072; Referee: Lee Swabey

2 January 2016 24	Exeter City	1–2	Dagenham & Redbridge	Exeter
15:00 GMT	Nichols 43'	Report	Labadie 11'; Chambers 74'	Stadium: St James Park; Attendance: 3,451; Referee: Graham Horwood

12 January 2016 25	Morecambe	1–1	Exeter City	Morecambe
19:45 GMT	Miller 49'	Report	Stockley 54'	Stadium: Globe Arena; Attendance: 1,040 (62 away); Referee: Andy Haines

16 January 2016 26	Leyton Orient	1–3	Exeter City	Leyton
15:00 GMT	Palmer 1'	Report	Stockley 14', 32'; Nichols 23'	Stadium: Brisbane Road; Attendance: 5,758 (529 away); Referee: Keith Hill

23 January 2016 27	Exeter City	2–1	Accrington Stanley	Exeter
15:00 GMT	Nichols 5'; Ribeiro 79'	Report	McCartan 3'	Stadium: St James Park; Attendance: 3,669; Referee: Lee Collins

30 January 2016 28	Hartlepool United	0–2	Exeter City	Hartlepool
15:00 GMT		Report	Nicholls 36'; Grant 85'	Stadium: Victoria Park; Attendance: 3,678 (107 away); Referee: Darren Handley

13 February 2016 29	Wycombe Wanderers	1–0	Exeter City	High Wycombe
15:00 GMT	McGinn 53'	Report		Stadium: Adams Park; Attendance: 3,358 (390 away); Referee: David Webb

16 February 2016 30	York City	2–0	Exeter City	York
19:45 GMT	Fewster 35', 64'	Report		Stadium: Bootham Crescent; Attendance: 2,920 (146 away); Referee: Mark Brown

20 February 2016 31	Exeter City	1–1	Newport County	Exeter
13:00 GMT	Tillson 51'	Report	Boden 84'	Stadium: St James Park; Attendance: 3,924; Referee: Mark Heywood

23 February 2016 32	Exeter City	1–4	Oxford United	Exeter
19:45 GMT	Nicholls 77'	Report	Dunkley 7'; Bowery 41', 59'; MacDonald 62'	Stadium: St James Park; Attendance: 3,089; Referee: Simon Hooper

27 February 2016 33	Stevenage	0–2	Exeter City	Stevenage
15:00 GMT		Report	Stockley 84', 90+7'	Stadium: Broadhall Way; Attendance: 2,812 (253 away); Referee: Dean Whitestone

1 March 2016 34	Exeter City	1–1	Portsmouth	Exeter
19:45 GMT	Watkins 90'	Report	Chaplin 31'	Stadium: St James Park; Attendance: 3,855; Referee: Brendan Malone

5 March 2016 35	Cambridge United	0–1	Exeter City	Cambridge
15:00 GMT		Report	Watkins 76'	Stadium: Abbey Stadium; Attendance: 4,573 (273 away); Referee: Fred Graham

12 March 2016 36	Exeter City	2–2	Carlisle United	Exeter
15:00 GMT	Stockley 7'; Wheeler 79'	Report	Wyke 27'; Hope 85'	Stadium: St James Park; Attendance: 3,375; Referee: Nick Kinseley

19 March 2016 37	Notts County	1–4	Exeter City	Nottingham
15:00	McLeod 36'	Report	Stockley 8'; Taylor 68'; Ribeiro 71'; Watkins 78'	Stadium: Meadow Lane; Attendance: 3,813 (346 away); Referee: Tony Harrington

25 March 2016 38	Exeter City	1–1	Barnet	Exeter
15:00	Stockley 20'	Report	Weston 27'	Stadium: St James Park; Attendance: 4,389; Referee: Trevor Kettle

28 March 2016 39	Crawley Town	0–2	Exeter City	Crawley
15:00		Report	Taylor 28'; Watkins 74'	Stadium: Broadfield Stadium; Attendance: 2,416 (462 away); Referee: Andy Haines

2 April 2016 40	Exeter City	2–1	Plymouth Argyle	Exeter
15:00	Watkins 80', 90+2'	Report	Matt 57'	Stadium: St James Park; Attendance: 7,177; Referee: Keith Stroud

9 April 2016 41	Yeovil Town	0–2	Exeter City	Yeovil
15:00		Report	Watkins 16'; Taylor 69'	Stadium: Huish Park; Attendance: 5,394 (1,513 away); Referee: Steve Martin

16 April 2016 42	Exeter City	0–0	Northampton Town	Exeter
15:00		Report		Stadium: St James Park; Attendance: 5,077; Referee: Oliver Langford

19 April 2016 43	Exeter City	2–3	Mansfield Town	Exeter
19:45	Watkins 64'; Ribeiro 79'	Report	Tafazolli 11', 82'; Benning 56'	Stadium: St James Park; Attendance: 3,407; Referee: Charles Breakspear

23 April 2016 44	Bristol Rovers	3–1	Exeter City	Bristol
15:00	Bodin 13'; Brown 45+4'; M. Taylor 69'	Report	J. Taylor 48'	Stadium: Memorial Stadium; Attendance: 10,254 (893 away); Referee: Nigel Miller

30 April 2016 45	Exeter City	1–1	Morecambe	Exeter
15:00	Stockley 89' (pen.)	Report	Ellison 85'	Stadium: St James Park; Attendance: 3,936; Referee: Darren Drysdale

7 May 2016 46	Luton Town	4–1	Exeter City	Luton
15:00	McGeehan 27'; Marriott 33', 63'; Pigott 34'	Report	Stockley 47'	Stadium: Kenilworth Road; Attendance: 8,427 (310 away); Referee: Carl Boyeson

==== Score overview ====
Win Draw Loss

Opposition	Home	Away	Dou.	Agg.
Accrington Stanley	2–1	2–4	No	4–5
AFC Wimbledon	0–2	1–2	No	1–4
Barnet	1–1	0–2	No	1–3
Bristol Rovers	1–1	1–3	No	2–4
Cambridge United	1–0	1–0	Yes	2–0
Carlisle United	2–2	0–1	No	2–3
Crawley Town	2–2	2–0	No	4–2
Dagenham & Redbridge	1–2	2–1	No	3–3
Hartlepool United	1–0	2–0	Yes	3–0
Leyton Orient	4–0	3–1	Yes	7–1
Luton Town	2–3	1–4	No	3–7
Mansfield Town	2–3	2–0	No	4–3
Morecambe	1–1	1–1	No	2–2
Newport County	1–1	1–1	No	2–2
Northampton Town	0–0	0–3	No	0–3
Notts County	1–1	4–1	No	5–2
Oxford United	1–4	0–3	No	1–7
Plymouth Argyle	2–1	2–1	Yes	4–2
Portsmouth	1–1	2–1	No	3–2
Stevenage	3–3	2–0	No	5–3
Wycombe Wanderers	0–2	0–1	No	0–3
Yeovil Town	3–2	2–0	Yes	5–2
York City	0–0	0–2	No	0–2

Note: Exeter City goals are listed first.

=== FA Cup ===
During the First Round Proper draw on 26 October 2015, Exeter were drawn against 8th-tier side Didcot Town. For the second round, Exeter faced League One team Port Vale, winning the fixture 2–0. During the draw for the third round, Exeter were drawn against Premier League side Liverpool. The match ended with a draw as Liverpool fielded a largely inexperienced side and was televised on BBC One. A rematch was played at Anfield on 20 January. It was reported that the two matches against Liverpool could eventually result in a £1,000,000 windfall for Exeter City. This amount was eventually revealed to be £700,000 Exeter were thoroughly overpowered in the replay, losing 3–0. Liverpool had 26 shots, compared to Exeter's 4.

8 November 2015 First round	Didcot Town	0–3	Exeter City	Didcot
19:45 GMT		Report	Morrison 48'; Nichols 73'; Nicholls 78'	Stadium: Loop Meadow; Attendance: 2,707 (600 away); Referee: Chris Kavanagh

6 December 2015 Second round	Exeter City	2–0	Port Vale	Exeter
14:00 GMT	Tillson 19'; Watkins 89'	Report		Stadium: St James Park; Attendance: 3,565; Referee: Trevor Kettle

8 January 2016 Third round	Exeter City	2–2	Liverpool	Exeter
19:55 GMT	Nichols 9'; Holmes 45'	Report	Sinclair 12'; Smith 73'	Stadium: St James Park; Attendance: 8,298; Referee: Stuart Attwell

20 January 2016 Replay	Liverpool	3–0	Exeter City	Liverpool
20:00 GMT	Allen 10'; Ojo 74'; Teixeira 82'	Report		Stadium: Anfield; Attendance: 43,292 (6,000 away); Referee: Neil Swarbrick

=== League Cup ===
On 16 June 2015, the first round draw was made, Exeter City were drawn away against Swindon Town. On 11 August 2015, Exeter won against Swindon Town 2–1 with goals from David Wheeler and Alex Nicholls at the County Ground. On 13 August 2015, the second round draw was made and Exeter City were drawn away against Premier League team Sunderland. Sunderland scored two early goals before Exeter equalised through Emmanuel Oyeleke and David Wheeler. The score was 3–3 at half-time, which became 6–3 to Sunderland at full-time as Exeter's defence failed, including an incident where goalkeeper Bobby Olejnik was caught off his line. This is the most goals Exeter have conceded all season so far, and was the second of five games in the season in which Exeter lost by three goals.

11 August 2015 First round	Swindon Town	1–2	Exeter City	Swindon
19:45 BST	Obika 65'	Report	Nicholls 37'; Wheeler 42'	Stadium: County Ground; Attendance: 4,693 (506 away)

25 August 2015 Second round	Sunderland	6–3	Exeter City	Sunderland
19:45 BST	Rodwell 12', 64'; Defoe 16', 39', 87'; Watmore 78'	Report	Oyeleke 19'; Wheeler 31'; McCready 43'	Stadium: Stadium of Light; Attendance: 14,360 (495 away); Referee: Stuart Attwell

=== Football League Trophy ===
On 8 August 2015, live on Soccer AM the draw for the first round of the Football League Trophy was drawn by Toni Duggan and Alex Scott. Grecians hosted Portsmouth and won the match 2–0, advancing to the next round. The draw for the second round was held on 5 September 2015, again live on Soccer AM. Exeter were drawn against rivals Plymouth Argyle.

1 September 2015 First round	Exeter City	2–0	Portsmouth	Exeter
19:45 BST	Harley 54' (pen.); Nicholls 72'	Report		Stadium: St James Park; Attendance: 2,323; Referee: Lee Swabey

6 October 2015 Second round	Plymouth Argyle	2–0	Exeter City	Plymouth
19:45 BST	Boateng 32'; Tanner 49'	Report		Stadium: Home Park; Attendance: 9,441 (877 away); Referee: Brendan Malone

== Squad statistics ==
Numbers in parentheses denote appearances as substitute.
Players with squad numbers struck through and marked † left the club during the playing season.
Players with names in italics and marked * were on loan from another club for the whole of their season with Wycombe.
Players listed with no appearances have been in the matchday squad but only as unused substitutes.
Key to positions: GK – Goalkeeper; DF – Defender; MF – Midfielder; FW – Forward

No.	Pos.	Nat.	Name	Apps	Goals	Apps	Goals	Apps	Goals	Apps	Goals	Apps	Goals	Yellow card	Red card
No.	Pos.	Nat.	Name	League		FA Cup		League Cup		FL Trophy		Total		Discipline	
1	GK	AUT	Bobby Olejnik	45	0	4	0	2	0	2	0	53	0	2	0
2	DF	ENG	Danny Butterfield	8 (2)	0	1	0	2	0	2	0	13 (2)	0	3	0
3	DF	ENG	Craig Woodman	22 (3)	0	3	0	0 (1)	0	1	0	26 (4)	0	3	0
4	MF	ENG	David Noble	24 (6)	0	2	0	1	0	0	0	27 (6)	0	5	0
5	DF	SCO	Jamie McAllister	25 (3)	0	1	0	2	0	0	0	28 (3)	0	6	0
6	DF	WAL	Christian Ribeiro	31 (4)	4	2	0	1	0	0 (1)	0	34 (5)	4	2	0
7	MF	ENG	Ryan Harley	26 (2)	4	1	0	1	0	2	1	30 (2)	5	0	0
8	MF	ENG	Matt Oakley	24 (5)	0	1 (2)	0	0 (1)	0	0	0	25 (8)	0	2	0
10	MF	ENG	Lee Holmes	30 (7)	2	3	1	1	0	1	0	35 (7)	3	4	0
11	MF	WAL	Arron Davies	10 (18)	1	3 (1)	0	2	0	1	0	16 (19)	1	1	0
13	FW	IRL	Clinton Morrison	4 (16)	1	2	1	0 (1)	0	0 (2)	0	6 (19)	2	2	0
14	FW	ENG	Alex Nicholls	26 (9)	5	3 (1)	1	1	1	2	1	32 (10)	8	2	0
15	DF	ENG	Jordan Moore-Taylor	32	0	4	0	0	0	2	0	38	0	2	0
16	FW	ENG	Will Hoskins	2 (7)	1	0 (1)	0	0 (2)	0	0	0	2 (10)	1	0	0
18	FW	NIR	Jamie Reid	8 (5)	1	2	0	0	0	0 (1)	0	10 (6)	1	1	0
19	MF	ENG	Emmanuel Oyeleke	4 (4)	0	1	0	1	1	1	0	7 (4)	1	1	0
~~20~~ †	FW	ENG	Tom Nichols	19 (4)	10	2 (2)	2	1	0	0 (1)	0	22 (7)	12	2	0
21	GK	GUE	James Hamon	1	0	0	0	0	0	0	0	1	0	0	0
22	MF	ENG	David Wheeler	26 (5)	6	2 (1)	0	2	2	2	0	32 (6)	8	0	0
23	MF	ENG	Tom McCready	8 (2)	0	0	0	1	1	2	0	11 (2)	1	1	0
26	MF	ENG	Jordan Tillson	22 (4)	1	2	1	2	0	2	0	28 (4)	2	6	0
27	MF	ENG	Matt Jay	0	0	0	0	0	0	0 (1)	0	0 (1)	0	0	0
29	FW	ENG	Ollie Watkins	15 (5)	8	0 (2)	1	0	0	0	0	15 (7)	9	5	0
30	GK	ENG	Christy Pym	0	0	0	0	0	0	0	0	0	0	0	0
31	MF	JAM	Joel Grant	19 (7)	4	1 (2)	0	0 (1)	0	1	0	21 (10)	4	2	0
~~33~~ †	DF	ENG	Josh Read	0	0	0	0	0	0	0	0	0	0	0	0
33	FW	ENG	Jayden Stockley *	21 (1)	10	0	0	0	0	0	0	21 (1)	10	3	0
36	DF	ENG	Kyle Egan	0	0	0	0	0	0	0	0	0	0	0	0
38	MF	WAL	Jake Taylor	7 (9)	4	0	0	0	0	0	0	7 (9)	4	3	0
39	DF	WAL	Troy Brown	39 (1)	1	4	0	2	0	1	0	46 (1)	1	7	0

Players not included in matchday squads
No.	Pos.	Nat.	Name
28	MF	ENG	Jason Pope
32	GK	ENG	Kavanagh Keadell
34	MF	ENG	Joe Charles
35	FW	ENG	Cameron Gill
