= 2021–22 Bristol City F.C. season =

Bristol City
2021–22 season
- Owner: Stephen Lansdown
- Manager: Nigel Pearson
- Stadium: Ashton Gate Stadium
- EFL Championship: 17th
- FA Cup: Third round
- EFL Cup: First round
- Top goalscorer: League: Andreas Weimann (22); All: Andreas Weimann (22)
Home colours	Away colours	Third colours

The 2021–22 season was Bristol City Football Club's 124th season in existence and seventh consecutive season in the Championship. They also competed in the FA Cup and the EFL Cup.

== Squad ==
As of 14 August 2020

Note: Flags indicate national team as has been defined under FIFA eligibility rules. Players may hold more than one non-FIFA nationality.

No.	Name	Nat.	Position(s)	Date of birth (age)	Apps.	Goals	Year signed	Signed from	Transfer fee	Ends
Goalkeepers
1	Dan Bentley	(England)	GK	13 July 1993 (aged 28)	127	0	2019	(England) Brentford	Undisclosed	2023
12	Max O'Leary	(England)	GK	10 October 1996 (aged 24)	36	0	2015	Academy	Trainee	2023
13	Harvey Wiles-Richards	(England)	GK	27 May 2002 (aged 19)	0	0	2019	(England) Bath City	Free transfer	2023
Defenders
3	Jay Dasilva	(England)	LB/LM	22 April 1998 (aged 23)	106	2	2019	(England) Chelsea	Undisclosed	2023
5	Robert Atkinson	(England)	CB/LB	13 July 1998 (aged 23)	35	2	2021	(England) Oxford United	Undisclosed	2024
16	Cameron Pring	(England)	LB	22 January 1998 (aged 23)	34	0	2016	Academy	Trainee	2023
17	Nathan Baker	(England)	CB	23 April 1991 (aged 30)	148	4	2017	(England) Aston Villa	Undisclosed	2023
19	George Tanner	(England)	RB/CB	16 November 1999 (aged 21)	13	1	2021	(England) Carlisle United	Undisclosed	2024
22	Tomáš Kalas	(Czech Republic)	CB	15 May 1993 (aged 28)	144	1	2019	(England) Chelsea	£8,000,000	2023
23	Taylor Moore	(England)	CB/RB	12 May 1997 (aged 24)	61	1	2016	(France) Lens	£1,500,000	2023
24	Robbie Cundy	(England)	CB	30 May 1997 (aged 24)	14	0	2019	(England) Bath City	Undisclosed	2022
25	Timm Klose	(Switzerland) (West Germany)	CB	9 May 1988 (aged 33)	18	1	2022	(England) Norwich City	Free	2022
26	Zak Vyner	(England)	CB/RB	14 May 1997 (aged 24)	92	1	2015	Academy	Trainee	2023
Midfielders
6	Matty James	(England)	CM/DM	22 July 1991 (aged 30)	33	1	2021	(England) Leicester City	Free	2024
8	Joe Williams	(England)	DM/CM	8 December 1996 (aged 24)	25	0	2020	(England) Wigan Athletic	£1,200,000	2024
10	Andy King	(Wales) (England)	CM/AM/DM	29 October 1988 (aged 32)	15	1	2021	(Belgium) OH Leuven	Free	2022
11	Callum O'Dowda	(Republic of Ireland) (England)	LM/AM/RM	23 April 1995 (aged 26)	175	10	2016	(England) Oxford United	£1,250,000	2022
15	Tyreeq Bakinson	(England)	DM/CM	10 October 1998 (aged 22)	53	5	2017	(England) Luton Town	Undisclosed	2022
28	Sam Pearson	(Wales)	RW/LW	26 October 2001 (aged 19)	5	0	2020	Academy	Trainee	2024
32	James Morton	(England)	DM/CM	22 April 1999 (aged 22)	1	0	2017	Academy	Trainee	2023
34	Ryley Towler	(England)	DM/CB/LB	6 May 2002 (aged 19)	5	0	2020	Academy	Trainee	2024
35	Owura Edwards	(England)	RW/LW	10 April 2001 (aged 20)	3	0	2019	Academy	Trainee	2023
36	Alex Scott	(England) (Guernsey)	CM	21 August 2003 (aged 17)	42	4	2021	Academy	Trainee	Undisclosed
42	Han-Noah Massengo	(France)	CM/DM	7 July 2001 (aged 20)	96	0	2019	(France) Monaco	£7,200,000	2023
45	Kasey Palmer	(Jamaica) (England)	AM/LW/RW	9 November 1996 (aged 24)	71	8	2019	(England) Chelsea	£3,500,000	2023
Forwards
9	Chris Martin	(Scotland) (England)	CF/SS	4 November 1988 (aged 32)	76	16	2020	(England) Derby County	Free	2022
14	Andreas Weimann	(Austria)	SS/CF/RW/LW	5 August 1991 (aged 30)	148	43	2018	(England) Derby County	Undisclosed	2024
18	Antoine Semenyo	(England)	CF/LW	7 January 2000 (aged 21)	97	13	2019	Academy	Trainee	2023
21	Nahki Wells	(Bermuda)	CF	1 June 1990 (aged 31)	100	18	2020	(England) Burnley	Undisclosed	2023
33	Sam Bell	(England)	CF	23 May 2002 (aged 19)	11	0	2019	Academy	Trainee	Undisclosed
37	Tommy Conway	(England)	CF	6 August 2002 (aged 19)	12	1	2020	Academy	Trainee	2024
40	Louis Britton	(England)	CF	17 March 2001 (aged 20)	0	0	2019	(England) Mangotsfield United	Trainee	2022
46	Saikou Janneh	(The Gambia)	CF	11 January 2000 (aged 21)	6	2	2018	Academy	Trainee	2023

== Statistics ==
As of 7 May 2022
Players with names in italics and marked * were on loan from another club for the whole of their season with Bristol City.

No.	Pos	Nat	Player	Total		Championship		FA Cup		League Cup	
No.	Pos	Nat	Player	Apps	Goals	Apps	Goals	Apps	Goals	Apps	Goals
1	GK	(England) ENG	Dan Bentley	38	0	37+1	0	0+0	0	0+0	0
3	DF	(England) ENG	Jay Dasilva	37	1	28+8	1	0+1	0	0+0	0
5	DF	(England) ENG	Robert Atkinson	35	2	29+5	2	1+0	0	0+0	0
6	MF	(England) ENG	Matty James	33	1	31+2	1	0+0	0	0+0	0
8	MF	(England) ENG	Joe Williams	22	0	12+9	0	0+0	0	1+0	0
9	FW	(Scotland) SCO	Chris Martin	47	12	44+2	12	1+0	0	0+0	0
10	MF	(Wales) WAL	Andy King	15	1	10+4	1	1+0	0	0+0	0
11	MF	(Republic of Ireland) IRL	Callum O'Dowda	21	1	16+4	1	1+0	0	0+0	0
12	GK	(England) ENG	Max O'Leary	11	0	9+0	0	1+0	0	1+0	0
14	FW	(Austria) AUT	Andreas Weimann	47	22	46+0	22	0+1	0	0+0	0
16	DF	(England) ENG	Cameron Pring	34	0	23+9	0	1+0	0	1+0	0
17	DF	(England) ENG	Nathan Baker	15	1	13+2	1	0+0	0	0+0	0
18	FW	(England) ENG	Antoine Semenyo	31	9	24+6	9	0+1	0	0+0	0
19	DF	(England) ENG	George Tanner	13	1	11+2	1	0+0	0	0+0	0
21	FW	(Bermuda) BER	Nahki Wells	34	3	7+25	3	1+0	0	1+0	0
22	DF	(Czech Republic) CZE	Tomáš Kalas	37	0	34+1	0	1+0	0	1+0	0
24	DF	(England) ENG	Robbie Cundy	14	0	10+4	0	0+0	0	0+0	0
25	DF	(Switzerland) SUI	Timm Klose	18	1	18+0	1	0+0	0	0+0	0
26	DF	(England) ENG	Zak Vyner	22	0	19+3	0	0+0	0	0+0	0
31	DF	(England) ENG	Duncan Idehen	2	0	0+2	0	0+0	0	0+0	0
33	FW	(England) ENG	Sam Bell	6	0	3+2	0	0+0	0	1+0	0
34	MF	(England) ENG	Ryley Towler	1	0	1+0	0	0+0	0	0+0	0
36	MF	(England) ENG	Alex Scott	38	4	34+3	4	1+0	0	0+0	0
37	FW	(England) ENG	Tommy Conway	6	0	0+4	0	0+1	0	0+1	0
38	MF	(England) ENG	Ayman Benarous	12	0	7+4	0	1+0	0	0+0	0
42	MF	(France) FRA	Han-Noah Massengo	39	0	26+11	0	1+0	0	1+0	0
45	MF	(Jamaica) JAM	Kasey Palmer	8	1	1+5	1	0+1	0	0+1	0
Players out on loan:
15	MF	(England) ENG	Tyreeq Bakinson	14	1	10+3	1	0+0	0	0+1	0
23	DF	(England) ENG	Taylor Moore	1	0	0+0	0	0+0	0	1+0	0
46	FW	(The Gambia) GAM	Saikou Janneh	2	2	0+1	0	0+0	0	1+0	2
Players who left the club:
2	DF	(England) ENG	Danny Simpson	4	0	2+1	0	0+0	0	1+0	0
4	MF	(Hungary) HUN	Ádám Nagy	1	0	0+0	0	0+0	0	1+0	0

=== Goals record ===
As of 7 May 2022

Rank	No.	Nat.	Po.	Name	Championship	FA Cup	League Cup	Total
1	14	(Austria)	SS	Andreas Weimann	22	0	0	22
2	9	(Scotland)	CF	Chris Martin	12	0	0	12
3	18	(England)	CF	Antoine Semenyo	8	0	0	8
4	36	(England)	AM	Alex Scott	4	0	0	4
5	21	(Bermuda)	CF	Nahki Wells	3	0	0	3
6	5	(England)	CB	Robert Atkinson	2	0	0	2
6	46	(The Gambia)	CF	Saikou Janneh	0	0	2	2
8	3	(England)	LB	Jay Dasilva	1	0	0	1
8	10	(Wales)	CM	Andy King	1	0	0	1
8	11	(Republic of Ireland)	LM	Callum O'Dowda	1	0	0	1
8	15	(England)	CM	Tyreeq Bakinson	1	0	0	1
8	17	(England)	CB	Nathan Baker	1	0	0	1
8	19	(England)	RB	George Tanner	1	0	0	1
8	25	(Switzerland)	CB	Timm Klose	1	0	0	1
8	45	(Jamaica)	AM	Kasey Palmer	1	0	0	1
Own Goals					2	0	0	2
Total					60	0	2	62

=== Disciplinary ===
As of 7 May 2022

Rank	No.	Nat.	Po.	Name	Championship			FA Cup			League Cup			Total		
Rank	No.	Nat.	Po.	Name	Booked	(yellow card) (yellow-red card)	Sent off (straight red)	Booked	(yellow card) (yellow-red card)	Sent off (straight red)	Booked	(yellow card) (yellow-red card)	Sent off (straight red)	Booked	(yellow card) (yellow-red card)	Sent off (straight red)
1	36	(England)	AM	Alex Scott	12	0	0	0	0	0	0	0	0	12	0	0
2	8	(England)	DM	Joe Williams	8	0	0	0	0	0	0	0	0	8	0	0
2	18	(England)	CF	Antoine Semenyo	8	0	0	0	0	0	0	0	0	8	0	0
4	14	(Austria)	SS	Andreas Weimann	7	0	0	0	0	0	0	0	0	7	0	0
4	16	(England)	LB	Cameron Pring	7	0	0	0	0	0	0	0	0	7	0	0
6	9	(Scotland)	CF	Chris Martin	5	0	0	0	0	0	0	0	0	5	0	0
6	22	(Czech Republic)	CB	Tomáš Kalas	5	0	0	0	0	0	0	0	0	5	0	0
8	5	(England)	CB	Robert Atkinson	4	0	0	0	0	0	0	0	0	4	0	0
8	21	(Bermuda)	CF	Nahki Wells	4	0	0	0	0	0	0	0	0	4	0	0
8	25	(Switzerland)	CB	Timm Klose	4	0	0	0	0	0	0	0	0	4	0	0
11	1	(England)	GK	Dan Bentley	3	0	0	0	0	0	0	0	0	3	0	0
11	2	(England)	RB	Danny Simpson	3	0	0	0	0	0	0	0	0	3	0	0
11	3	(England)	LB	Jay Dasilva	3	0	0	0	0	0	0	0	0	3	0	0
11	10	(Wales)	CM	Andy King	1	1	0	0	0	0	0	0	0	1	1	0
11	11	(Republic of Ireland)	LM	Callum O'Dowda	3	0	0	0	0	0	0	0	0	3	0	0
11	15	(England)	CM	Tyreeq Bakinson	3	0	0	0	0	0	0	0	0	3	0	0
17	42	(France)	DM	Han-Noah Massengo	2	0	0	0	0	0	0	0	0	2	0	0
18	6	(England)	CM	Matty James	1	0	0	0	0	0	0	0	0	1	0	0
18	24	(England)	CB	Robbie Cundy	1	0	0	0	0	0	0	0	0	1	0	0
18	33	(England)	CF	Sam Bell	1	0	0	0	0	0	0	0	0	1	0	0
18	34	(England)	DM	Ryley Towler	1	0	0	0	0	0	0	0	0	1	0	0
18	38	(England)	LM	Ayman Benarous	1	0	0	0	0	0	0	0	0	1	0	0
Total					81	1	0	0	0	0	0	0	0	81	1	0

== Transfers ==
=== Transfers in ===
Date	Position	Nationality	Name	From	Fee	Ref.
1 July 2021	CM	(England)	Matty James	(England) Leicester City	Free transfer	
2 July 2021	CM	(Wales)	Andy King	(Belgium) OH Leuven	Free transfer	
3 July 2021	CB	(England)	Robert Atkinson	(England) Oxford United	Undisclosed	
30 August 2021	CB	(England)	George Tanner	(England) Carlisle United	Undisclosed	
1 January 2022	CB	(England)	Duncan Idehen	(England) Birmingham City	Free transfer	
27 January 2022	CB	(Switzerland)	Timm Klose	(England) Norwich City	Free transfer	

=== Loans in ===
Date from	Position	Nationality	Name	From	Date until	Ref.

=== Loans out ===
Date from	Position	Nationality	Name	To	Date until	Ref.
5 August 2021	LB	(Wales)	Callum Wood	(England) Bath City	End of season	
7 August 2021	DF	(Wales)	Joe Low	(England) Eastleigh	10 November 2021 (Note: On 10 November, Joe was recalled with immediate effect from his loan at Eastleigh.)	
12 August 2021	FW	(England)	Prince Henry	(England) Hungerford Town	September 2021	
20 August 2021	RW	(England)	Owura Edwards	(England) Exeter City	14 January 2022 (Note: On 14 January, Edwards was recalled early from his loan at Exeter.)	
27 August 2021	LW	(Australia)	Marlee Francois	(England) Bath City	2 January 2022	
27 August 2021	CB	(England)	Taylor Moore	(Scotland) Heart of Midlothian	End of season	
4 September 2021	CM	(England)	Josh Owers	(England) Bath City	January 2022	
7 September 2021	DF	(England)	Khari Allen	(England) Taunton Town	January 2022	
7 September 2021	GK	(England)	Will Buse	(England) Taunton Town	January 2022	
8 September 2021	CB	(England)	Ryley Towler	(England) Grimsby Town	20 December 2021 (Note: On 20 December 2021, Towler was recalled from his loan spell at Grimsby Town with immediate effect.)	
8 October 2021	GK	(England)	James Walker	(England) Guernsey	November 2021	
22 November 2021	CF	(England)	Sam Bell	(England) Grimsby Town	4 January 2022	
2 December 2021	CF	(England)	Louis Britton	(England) Woking	2 January 2022	
1 January 2022	CF	(The Gambia)	Saikou Janneh	(England) Shrewsbury Town	End of season	
17 January 2022	RW	(England)	Owura Edwards	(England) Colchester United	End of season	
20 January 2022	DM	(England)	Tyreeq Bakinson	(England) Ipswich Town	End of season	
21 January 2022	CF	(Wales)	Sam Pearson	(Scotland) Inverness Caledonian Thistle	1 April 2022 (Note: Sam returned from his loan spell early, due to a family bereavement.)	
1 February 2022	CF	(England)	Louis Britton	(Republic of Ireland) Waterford	End of season	
25 March 2022	GK	(England)	Harvey Wiles-Richards	(England) Gloucester City	End of season	

=== Transfers out ===
Date	Position	Nationality	Name	To	Fee	Ref.
30 June 2021	RW	(England)	Hakeeb Adelakun	(England) Lincoln City	Released	
30 June 2021	CB	(England)	Aden Baldwin	(England) Milton Keynes Dons	Released	
30 June 2021	CF	(Senegal)	Famara Diédhiou	(Turkey) Alanyaspor	Free transfer	
30 June 2021	RM	(England)	Opi Edwards	(England) Forest Green Rovers	Released	
30 June 2021	GK	(Republic of Ireland)	Rene Gilmartin	Retired	Released	
30 June 2021	LB	(England)	Vincent Harper	(England) Chippenham Town	Released	
30 June 2021	CF	(England)	Freddie Hinds	(England) Hemel Hempstead Town	Released	
30 June 2021	RB	(England)	Jack Hunt	(England) Sheffield Wednesday	Released	
30 June 2021	CM	(England)	Henri Lansbury	(England) Luton Town	Released	
30 June 2021	CB	(Jamaica)	Adrian Mariappa	(Australia) Macarthur	Released	
30 June 2021	AM	(England)	Jamie Paterson	(Wales) Swansea City	Released	
30 June 2021	LM	(England)	Tommy Rowe	(England) Doncaster Rovers	Released	
30 June 2021	CM	(England)	Zac Smith	(England) Taunton Town	Released	
30 June 2021	CM	(England)	Liam Walsh	(Wales) Swansea City	Released	
30 June 2021	CF	(Wales)	Marley Watkins	(Wales) Cardiff City	Released	
30 June 2021	CB	(England)	Bradley Webb	(England) Aldershot Town	Released	
30 June 2021	GK	(England)	Joe Wollacott	(England) Swindon Town	Free transfer	
28 July 2021	LB	(England)	George Nurse	(England) Shrewsbury Town	Undisclosed	
27 August 2021	DM	(Hungary)	Ádám Nagy	(Italy) Pisa 1909	Undisclosed	
7 March 2022	RB	(England)	Danny Simpson	Free agent	Mutual consent	

== Pre-season friendlies ==
Bristol City announced they would face Celtic, Portsmouth, Milton Keynes Dons, Exeter City and Plymouth Argyle as part of their pre-season preparations.

14 July 2021 Friendly	Bristol City	0–0	Celtic	Failand
19:45 BST		Report		Stadium: Robins High Performance Centre

20 July 2021 Friendly	Bristol City	3–3	Portsmouth	Failand
14:00 BST	Weimann 56'; Palmer 65'; Martin 78' (pen.)	Report	Ahadme 7', 45+5' (pen.); Francois 116'	Stadium: Robins High Performance Centre
Note: 120-minute match

24 July 2021 Friendly	Bristol City	3–1	Milton Keynes Dons	Failand
13:30 BST	Janneh 34'; Conway 51'; Wells 61'	Report	Bird 90'	Stadium: Robins High Performance Centre

27 July 2021 Friendly	Exeter City	0–4	Bristol City	Clyst St Mary
13:00 BST		Report	Wells 8' (pen.), 82'; Bakinson 38' (pen.); Nagy 62'	Stadium: Cliff Hill Training Ground; Attendance: 0 (Behind-closed-doors)

27 July 2021 Friendly	Plymouth Argyle	0–1	Bristol City	Plymouth
18:00 BST		Report	Weimann 55'	Stadium: Home Park

31 July 2021 Friendly	Bristol City	0–3	Aston Villa	Bristol
13:00 BST		Report	Philogene 6'; Konsa 44'; Watkins 60'	Stadium: Ashton Gate Stadium; Attendance: 8,589; Referee: Kevin Friend

== Competitions ==
=== Overview ===
Competition	First match	Last match	Starting round	Record							
Competition	First match	Last match	Starting round	Pld	W	D	L	GF	GA	GD	Win %
EFL Championship	7 August 2021	7 May 2022	Matchday 1	46	15	10	21	62	77	−15	32.61
FA Cup	8 January 2022	8 January 2022	Third round	1	0	0	1	0	1	−1	0.00
EFL Cup	10 August 2021	10 August 2021	First round	1	0	1	0	2	2	+0	0.00
Total				48	15	11	22	64	80	−16	31.25

Last updated: 7 May 2022
Source: Competitions

=== EFL Championship ===
==== League table ====
Pos	Team	Pld	W	D	L	GF	GA	GD	Pts
14	Stoke City	46	17	11	18	57	52	+5	62
15	Swansea City	46	16	13	17	58	68	−10	61
16	Blackpool	46	16	12	18	54	58	−4	60
17	Bristol City	46	15	10	21	62	77	−15	55
18	Cardiff City	46	15	8	23	50	68	−18	53
19	Hull City	46	14	9	23	41	54	−13	51
20	Birmingham City	46	11	14	21	50	75	−25	47

Source: EFL Official Website
Rules for classification: 1) Points; 2) Goal difference; 3) Number of goals scored; 4) Head-to-head results; 5) Wins; 6) Away goals; 7) Penalty points (sec 9.5); 8) 12-point sending off offences

==== Results summary ====
Overall								Home						Away					
Pld	W	D	L	GF	GA	GD	Pts	W	D	L	GF	GA	GD	W	D	L	GF	GA	GD
46	15	10	21	62	77	−15	55	8	8	7	33	29	+4	7	2	14	29	48	−19

Last updated: 7 May 2022.

==== Results by matchday ====
Matchday	1	2	3	4	5	6	7	8	9	10	11	12	13	14	15	16	17	18	19	20	21	22	23	24	25	26	27	28	29	30	31	32	33	34	35	36	37	38	39	40	41	42	43	44	45	46
Ground	H	A	A	H	A	H	H	A	H	A	A	H	H	A	H	A	A	H	H	A	H	A	H	H	H	A	H	A	A	A	H	A	H	H	A	H	A	A	H	A	H	A	H	A	H	A
Result	D	L	W	L	W	D	D	W	D	L	W	L	L	L	W	L	L	D	W	L	W	D	L	L	W	L	W	L	D	L	W	L	W	L	L	L	W	L	D	L	D	W	D	W	W	L
Position	12	17	11	15	11	11	11	9	8	10	9	11	16	17	15	19	19	18	18	18	17	18	18	18	15	16	16	16	16	17	16	17	16	16	16	19	17	18	18	18	19	18	18	17	17	17

Updated to match(es) played on 7 May 2022. Source:
A = Away; H = Home; W = Win; D = Draw; L = Loss

==== Matches ====
Bristol City's fixtures were revealed on 24 June 2021.

7 August 2021 1	Bristol City	1–1	Blackpool	Ashton Gate
15:00 BST	Martin 44'; Baker (yellow card) 64'; Bell (yellow card) 90+2'	Report	Lavery 90+3'	Stadium: Ashton Gate Stadium; Referee: Andy Davies

14 August 2021 2	Middlesbrough	2–1	Bristol City	Middlesbrough
15:00 BST	Ikpeazu 38'; Crooks 70'	Report	Atkinson (yellow card) 23'; King 60'	Stadium: Riverside Stadium; Attendance: 22,004; Referee: Oliver Langford

17 August 2021 3	Reading	2–3	Bristol City	Reading
20:00 BST	Azeez 19'; Moore 81'	Report	Weimann 5', 52'; Martin 14'; James (yellow card) 90+2'	Stadium: Select Car Leasing Stadium; Referee: Andy Woolmer

20 August 2021 4	Bristol City	0–1	Swansea City	Ashton Gate
19:45 BST	Simpson (yellow card) 36'; Weimann (yellow card) 58'; Atkinson (yellow card) 76'; Semenyo (yellow card) 84'	Report	Fulton (yellow card) 17'; Piroe 19', (yellow card) 35'; Manning (yellow card) 47'; Bidwell (yellow card) 57'; Latibeaudiere (yellow card) 67'; Grimes (yellow card) 90'	Stadium: Ashton Gate Stadium; Attendance: 20,139; Referee: Geoff Eltringham
Note: Live on Sky Sports

28 August 2021 5	Cardiff City	1–2	Bristol City	Cardiff
12:30 BST	Bentley 59' (o.g.); Morrison (yellow card) 74'; Ralls (yellow card) 87'	Report	Weimann 21', 70'; Semenyo (yellow card) 74'; Martin (yellow card) 74'	Stadium: Cardiff City Stadium; Attendance: 20,891; Referee: David Webb

11 September 2021 6	Bristol City	0–0	Preston North End	Ashton Gate
15:00 GMT		Report	Whiteman (yellow card) 55'	Stadium: Ashton Gate; Attendance: 17,967; Referee: Tim Robinson

15 September 2021 7	Bristol City	1–1	Luton Town	Ashton Gate
19:45 BST	Pring (yellow card) 37'; Baker 57'	Report	Lansbury (yellow card) 84'; Bree (yellow card) 88'; Hylton 90+1'	Stadium: Ashton Gate Stadium; Referee: Jeremy Simpson

18 September 2021 8	Queens Park Rangers	1–2	Bristol City	Shepherd's Bush, London
15:00 BST	Gray (yellow card) 51'; McCallum 54'; Barbet (yellow card) 79'; Ball (yellow card) 85'; Johansen (yellow card) 89'	Report	Martin 45'; Bakinson (yellow card) 53'; Wells 90+3'	Stadium: Kiyan Prince Foundation Stadium; Attendance: 14,922; Referee: Leigh Doughty

25 September 2021 9	Bristol City	1–1	Fulham	Ashton Gate
15:00 BST	Pring (yellow card) 22'; Palmer 79'	Report	Chalobah (yellow card) 30'; Mitrović 50'; Decordova-Reid (yellow card) 78'; Reed (yellow card) 90'	Stadium: Ashton Gate; Attendance: 19,326; Referee: Simon Hooper

29 September 2021 10	Millwall	1–0	Bristol City	Bermondsey
19:45 BST	Wallace 64' (pen.); McNamara (yellow card) 79'	Report	Williams (yellow card) 59'; Atkinson (yellow card) 63'	Stadium: The Den; Referee: Dean Whitestone

2 October 2021 11	Peterborough United	2–3	Bristol City	Peterborough
15:00 BST	Szmodics 22', 43'; Thompson (yellow card) 90+4'	Report	Thompson 34' (o.g.); Tanner 40'; King (yellow card) 82'; Martin 84'	Stadium: Weston Homes Stadium; Attendance: 8,560; Referee: David Coote

16 October 2021 12	Bristol City	0–2	Bournemouth	Ashton Gate
15:00 BST		Report	Lowe 21'; Cahill (yellow card) 40'; Zemura 45+1'; Kelly (yellow card) 68'	Stadium: Ashton Gate; Attendance: 20,828; Referee: Gavin Ward

19 October 2021 13	Bristol City	1–2	Nottingham Forest	Ashton Gate
19:45 BST	Scott 39', (yellow card) 66'	Report	Taylor 90+1' (pen.), 90+2'	Stadium: Ashton Gate; Referee: Steve Martin

23 October 2021 14	West Bromwich Albion	3–0	Bristol City	West Bromwich
15:15 BST	Jordan Hugill 7', Kyle Bartley 42', Karlan Grant 52'	Report		Stadium: The Hawthorns

30 October 2021 15	Bristol City	2–1	Barnsley	Ashton Gate
15:00 BST	Weimann 42', 45+2'	Report	Leya Iseka 28'	Stadium: Ashton Gate; Attendance: 18,347; Referee: Thomas Bramall

2 November 2021 16	Birmingham City	3–0	Bristol City	Birmingham
19:45 BST	McGree 14', Hogan 68', Gardner 76'	Report		Stadium: St Andrew's; Referee: Simon Hooper

6 November 2021 17	Coventry City	3–2	Bristol City	Coventry
15:00 BST	Maatsen (red card) 45'; Godden 51' (pen.), 90+2'; McFadzean (yellow card) 63'; O'Hare 74'	Report	Scott (yellow card) 14'; Martin 45+1' (pen.); Weimann 68'; Kalas (yellow card) 81'; Wells (yellow card) 90+1'	Stadium: Coventry Building Society Arena; Attendance: 19,855; Referee: Jeremy Simpson

20 November 2021 18	Bristol City	1–1	Blackburn Rovers	Ashton Gate
15:00 GMT	O'Dowda 34'; Williams (yellow card) 71'; Massengo (yellow card) 74'	Report	Nyambe (yellow card) 33'; Brereton 75'; Rothwell (yellow card) 82'	Stadium: Ashton Gate; Attendance: 18,347; Referee: John Busby

24 November 2021 19	Bristol City	1–0	Stoke City	Ashton Gate
19:45 GMT	O'Dowda (yellow card) 2'; Bakinson 38'; Scott (yellow card) 68'	Report	Allen (yellow card) 42' (yellow-red card) 90+7'; Tymon (yellow card) 79'	Stadium: Ashton Gate; Attendance: 16,949; Referee: Oliver Langford

28 November 2021 20	Sheffield United	2–0	Bristol City	Sheffield
12:30 GMT	Gibbs-White (yellow card) 31'; Brewster 40'; Sharp (yellow card) 78', (goal) 89'	Report	Bentley (yellow card) 20'; O'Dowda (yellow card) 28'; Martin (yellow card) 39'; Weimann (yellow card) 84'	Stadium: Bramall Lane; Attendance: 25,615; Referee: Geoff Eltringham

4 December 2021 21	Bristol City	1–0	Derby County	Ashton Gate
15:00 GMT	Scott 16'; Bakinson (yellow card) 39'; Kalas (yellow card) 45+1'; Pring (yellow card) 80'	Report	Knight (yellow card) 39'; Forsyth (yellow card) 40'	Stadium: Ashton Gate; Attendance: 18,732; Referee: Graham Scott

11 December 2021 22	Hull City	2–2	Bristol City	Kingston upon Hull
15:00 GMT	Longman 3'; Honeyman 79'; Smallwood (yellow card) 84'	Report	Semenyo 54'; Kalas (yellow card) 59'; Massengo (yellow card) 65'; James 90+1'	Stadium: MKM Stadium; Attendance: 10,446; Referee: Gavin Ward

18 December 2021 23	Bristol City	2–3	Huddersfield Town	Ashton Gate
15:00 GMT	Weimann 2', 90+7'	Report	Ward (penalty missed) 6', 55'; Thomas (yellow card) 21'; Holmes 41'; Sinani 46'; O'Brien (yellow card) 57'	Stadium: Ashton Gate; Attendance: 18,169; Referee: Dean Whitestone

30 December 2021 24	Bristol City	1–2	Queens Park Rangers	Ashton Gate
19:45 GMT	Scott 3'; King (yellow card) 45+3' (yellow-red card) 56'; Weimann (yellow card) 67'	Report	Dunne (yellow card) 22'; Austin 45+3' (pen.); Dykes (yellow card) 65'; Field (yellow card) 74'; Barbet 90+3'	Stadium: Ashton Gate; Attendance: 19,543; Referee: Andy Woolmer

2 January 2022 25	Bristol City	3–2	Millwall	Ashton Gate
13:00 GMT	Weimann 7', 73', 85'; Towler (yellow card) 28'; O'Dowda (yellow card) 48'; Semenyo (yellow card) 67'; Wells (yellow card) 90+5'	Report	Bradshaw 23'; Afobe 29' (pen.), (yellow card) 84'	Stadium: Ashton Gate; Referee: Simon Hooper

15 January 2022 26	Fulham	6–2	Bristol City	Fulham
15:00 GMT	Mitrović 21', 41', 45+1'; Kebano 31', 57'; Carvalho 36'	Report	Semenyo 7', 29'; Pring (yellow card) 46'; Scott (yellow card) 68'	Stadium: Craven Cottage; Attendance: 17,810; Referee: Tim Robinson

22 January 2022 27	Bristol City	3–2	Cardiff City	Ashton Gate
12:30 GMT	Martin 33', 63'; Pring (yellow card) 73'; Weimann 77'	Report	Collins (yellow card) 23', (goal) 31'; Ralls (yellow card) 44'; Watters 90'	Stadium: Ashton Gate; Attendance: 21,435; Referee: Gavin Ward

25 January 2022 28	Luton Town	2–1	Bristol City	Luton
19:45 GMT	Berry (yellow card) 24'; Lockyer 42'; Adebayo 68'; Kioso (yellow card) 90+7'	Report	Weimann 56'; Semenyo (yellow card) 62'; Pring (yellow card) 67'	Stadium: Kenilworth Road; Attendance: 9,202; Referee: Andy Davies

29 January 2022 29	Preston North End	2–2	Bristol City	Preston
15:00 GMT	Riis Jakobsen 52', 90+5'	Report	Martin 12'; Semenyo 81'	Stadium: Deepdale; Attendance: 11,936; Referee: John Busby

5 February 2022 30	Blackpool	3–1	Bristol City	Blackpool
15:00 GMT	Hamilton 36'; Madine 39', (yellow card) 80'; Bowler (yellow card) 44', (goal) 48'; Yates (yellow card) 81'; Connolly (yellow card) 84'	Report	Williams (yellow card) 80'; Semenyo (yellow card) 81'; Scott (yellow card) 84'; Wells 86', (yellow card) 89'	Stadium: Bloomfield Road; Attendance: 11,026; Referee: James Linington

9 February 2022 31	Bristol City	2–1	Reading	Ashton Gate
19:45 GMT	Kalas (yellow card) 32'; Semenyo 44'; Morrison 47' (o.g.); Dasilva (yellow card) 67'; Martin (yellow card) 82'; Williams (yellow card) 90+6'	Report	Holmes (yellow card) 22'; Swift 74' (pen.)	Stadium: Ashton Gate; Attendance: 17,798; Referee: Oliver Langford

13 February 2022 32	Swansea City	3–1	Bristol City	Landore
13:00 GMT	Obafemi 54', (yellow card) 56'; Christie 79', (yellow card) 90+2'; Piroe 90+4'	Report	Weimann 42'; Klose (yellow card) 59'; Dasilva (yellow card) 69'; Semenyo (yellow card) 86'; Martin (yellow card) 90+2'	Stadium: Swansea.com Stadium; Attendance: 19,162; Referee: Keith Stroud

19 February 2022 33	Bristol City	2–1	Middlesbrough	Ashton Gate
15:00 GMT	Weimann 7'; Williams (yellow card) 9'; Scott (yellow card) 40'; Semenyo 68'	Report	Crooks (yellow card) 17', (goal) 90'	Stadium: Ashton Gate Stadium; Attendance: 20,148; Referee: Leigh Doughty

22 February 2022 34	Bristol City	1–2	Coventry City	Ashton Gate
19:45 GMT	Semenyo (yellow card) 59'; Martin 62'	Report	Maatsen 25'; O'Hare (yellow card) 39'; Hyam (yellow card) 59'; Dabo (yellow card) 88'; Gyökeres 89'	Stadium: Ashton Gate Stadium; Attendance: 19,192; Referee: Dean Whitestone

26 February 2022 35	Nottingham Forest	2–0	Bristol City	West Bridgford
15:00 GMT	Johnson (yellow card) 32', (goal) 38'; Garner 55'	Report	Pring (yellow card) 9'; Scott (yellow card) 35'; Kalas (yellow card) 69'; Klose (yellow card) 90+4'	Stadium: The City Ground; Attendance: 28,506; Referee: Darren Bond

5 March 2022 36	Bristol City	1–2	Birmingham City	Ashton Gate
15:00 GMT	Klose (yellow card) 31'; Scott 48', (yellow card) 85'	Report	Chong 2'; Gordon 13'; Gardner (yellow card) 90+3'	Stadium: Ashton Gate Stadium; Attendance: 21,942; Referee: Thomas Bramall

12 March 2022 37	Blackburn Rovers	0–1	Bristol City	Ewood Park
15:00 GMT	Khadra (yellow card) 49'	Report	Scott (yellow card) 26'; Bentley (yellow card) 87'; Weimann (yellow card) 88', (goal) 90+2'	Stadium: Blackburn; Attendance: 13,567; Referee: Gavin Ward

15 March 2022 38	Barnsley	2–0	Bristol City	Barnsley
19:45 GMT	Morris 10'; Helik 21'	Report		Stadium: Oakwell Stadium; Attendance: 11,322; Referee: David Webb

19 March 2022 39	Bristol City	2-2	West Brom	Ashton Gate Stadium
15:00 GMT	Wells 29'; Weimann (yellow card) 76', (goal) 85'	Report	Livermore (yellow card) 36'; Grant 68' (pen.); Reach 90+3'	Stadium: Ashton Gate; Attendance: 20,586; Referee: Leigh Doughty

2 April 2022 40	Bournemouth	3–2	Bristol City	Kings Park
15:00 BST	Solanke 40'; Cook 52'; Dembélé 81'	Report	Atkinson 4'; Cundy (yellow card) 73'; Weimann 90+2'	Stadium: Vitality Stadium; Attendance: 9,937; Referee: Steve Martin

9 April 2022 41	Bristol City	1–1	Peterborough United	Ashton Gate
15:00 BST	Atkinson 43'; Scott (yellow card) 47'	Report	Ward (red card) 59'; Clarke-Harris 65'; Edwards (yellow card) 85'	Stadium: Ashton Gate Stadium; Referee: John Brooks

15 April 2022 42	Stoke City	0–1	Bristol City	Stoke-on-Trent
15:00 BST	Brown (yellow card) 45+3'; Fletcher (yellow card) 45+3'	Report	Bentley (yellow card) 45+3'; Williams (yellow card) 45+3'; Atkinson (yellow card) 76'; Martin (yellow card) 80'; Dasilva 84'	Stadium: Bet365 Stadium; Attendance: 20,298; Referee: Matt Donohue

18 April 2022 43	Bristol City	1–1	Sheffield United	Ashton Gate
17:30 BST	Martin 49'; Weimann (yellow card) 83'; Klose (yellow card) 90+1'	Report	Basham (yellow card) 21'; Egan (yellow card) 41'; Gibbs-White 60'; Baldock (yellow card) 65'; Fleck (yellow card) 84'	Stadium: Ashton Gate Stadium; Referee: Keith Stroud

23 April 2022 44	Derby County	1–3	Bristol City	Derby
15:00 BST	Byrne (yellow card) 54'; Forsyth 61'	Report	Williams (yellow card) 9'; Weimann 10'; Benarous (yellow card) 16'; Semenyo 38', (yellow card) 63'; Klose 79'	Stadium: Pride Park Stadium; Attendance: 22,753; Referee: Thomas Bramall

30 April 2022 45	Bristol City	5–0	Hull City	Ashton Gate
15:00 BST	Weimann 5', 82'; Scott (yellow card) 23'; Semenyo 33'; Martin 35', 54'	Report	Smallwood (yellow card) 88'; Jones (yellow card) 90'	Stadium: Ashton Gate Stadium; Attendance: 21,799; Referee: Ben Toner

7 May 2022 46	Huddersfield Town	2–0	Bristol City	Huddersfield
12:30 BST	Toffolo 33'; Pipa (yellow card) 35'; Ward 44'; Eiting (yellow card) 83'	Report	Scott (yellow card) 53'	Stadium: The John Smith's Stadium; Attendance: 17,797; Referee: David Webb

=== FA Cup ===
City were drawn at home to Fulham in the third round.

8 January 2022 Third round	Bristol City	0–1 (a.e.t.)	Fulham	Ashton Gate
12:30 GMT		Report	Carvalho (yellow card) 19'; Francois (yellow card) 65'; Wilson 105'; Cariney (yellow card) 120'	Stadium: Ashton Gate Stadium; Attendance: 7,304; Referee: Jonathan Moss

=== EFL Cup ===
Bristol City were drawn away to Forest Green Rovers in the first round.

10 August 2021 First round	Forest Green Rovers	2–2 (6–5 p)	Bristol City	Nailsworth
19:45 BST	Matt 11'; Godwin-Malife (yellow card) 45'; Sweeney (yellow card) 51'; Adams (yellow card) 89'; Hendry 90+6'	Report	Janneh 39', 67'; Wells (yellow card) 44'; Simpson (yellow card) 69'	Stadium: The Fully Charged New Lawn; Referee: Darren Drysdale
	Penalties
	Matt (penalty missed); Young (penalty scored); Hendry (penalty scored); Adams (penalty scored); Cadden (penalty scored); Stevenson (penalty scored); Sweeney (penalty scored)		Palmer (penalty missed); Massengo (penalty scored); Wells (penalty scored); Conway (penalty scored); Bakinson (penalty scored); Janneh (penalty scored); Pring (penalty missed)
