= Tom McCready (footballer, born 1991) =

English footballer

Personal information
- Full name: Thomas Richard McCready
- Date of birth: 7 June 1991 (age 35)
- Place of birth: Ellesmere Port, England
- Height: 6 ft 0 in (1.83 m)
- Position: Midfielder

Youth career
- Everton
- Hibernian

College career
Years	Team	Apps	(Gls)
2011–2013	Limestone Saints	36	(14)

Senior career*
Years	Team	Apps	(Gls)
2010	Altrincham	2	(0)
2010–2011	Chester	4	(0)
2011	→ Airbus UK Broughton (loan)	5	(2)
2014–2015	Morecambe	7	(0)
2015–2017	Exeter City	15	(0)
2017–2018	AFC Fylde	9	(0)
2018	→ Colwyn Bay (loan)	?	(?)
2018–2020	Colwyn Bay	34	(12)
2020–2021	Runcorn Linnets	3	(0)
2021–2024	Colwyn Bay	75	(24)
- * Club domestic league appearances and goals as of 21:17, 21 April 2024 (UTC)

Thomas Richard McCready (born 7 June 1991) is an English former footballer who played as a midfielder.

== Playing career ==
=== Youth ===
Born in Ellesmere Port, McCready was an Everton youth graduate before joining Hibernian on 12 July 2009.

=== Altrincham ===
He moved to Conference Premier side Altrincham on 5 August of the following year without making an appearance for Hibs.

=== Chester ===
After appearing in only two matches for the Robins, McCready moved to Chester, but suffered an injury shortly after.

He was later loaned to Welsh Premier League side Airbus where he scored 2 goals in 5 appearances.

=== Limestone College ===
After being released by Chester, McCready moved to the United States and accepted a scholarship from Limestone College.

In 2014, he went on a trial at his older brother Chris' club, Morecambe, where he played for the reserves.

=== Morecambe ===
On 4 July 2014 McCready returned to the Shrimps, also on trial.

On 23 July 2014, he signed for the club on non-contract terms.

McCready made his debut on 11 October 2014 in a 1–3 loss to Wycombe Wanderers in the League Two.

=== Exeter City ===
On 2 February 2015, McCready joined Exeter City on a free transfer from Morecambe. He scored his first goal for the club in a League Cup tie against Sunderland. He made very few appearances for City and was released at the end of the 2016–17 season, with manager Paul Tisdale commenting that McCready "sadly had a wretched year with injury".

== Career statistics ==
As of match played 11 September 2024

Appearances and goals by club, season and competition
Club	Season	League			National Cup		League Cup		Other		Total	
Club	Season	Division	Apps	Goals	Apps	Goals	Apps	Goals	Apps	Goals	Apps	Goals
Altrincham	2010–11	Conference Premier	2	0	0	0	0	0	0	0	2	0
Chester	2010–11	NPL Division One North	4	0	0	0	1	0	0	0	5	0
Airbus (loan)	2010–11	Welsh Premier League	5	2	0	0	0	0	0	0	5	2
Morecambe	2014–15	League Two	7	0	0	0	0	0	1 (Note: Appearances in the Football League Trophy)	0	8	0
Exeter City	2014–15	League Two	3	0	0	0	0	0	0	0	3	0
Exeter City	2015–16	League Two	10	0	0	0	1	1	2	0	13	1
Exeter City	2016–17	League Two	2	0	0	0	1	0	0	0	3	0
Exeter City	Total		15	0	0	0	2	1	2	0	19	1
AFC Fylde	2017–18	National League	9	0	0	0	—		1	0	10	0
Colwyn Bay	2018–19	NPL Division One West	13	4	0	0	0	0	0	0	13	4
Colwyn Bay	2019–20	Cymru North	21	8	4	2	1	0	0	0	26	10
Colwyn Bay	Total		34	12	4	2	1	0	0	0	39	14
Runcorn Linnets	2020–21	NPL Division One NW	3	0	0	0	—		3 (Note: Appearances in the FA Trophy)	0	6	0
Colwyn Bay	2021–22	Cymru North	26	9	5	0	1	0	0	0	32	9
Colwyn Bay	2022–23	Cymru North	27	12	1	0	1	0	2 (Note: Appearances in the Welsh Tier 2 Cup)	1	31	13
Colwyn Bay	2023–24	Cymru Premier	22	3	2	0	1	0	0	0	25	3
Colwyn Bay	Total		75	24	8	0	3	0	2	1	88	25
Colwyn Bay total			109	36	12	2	0	0	2	1	127	39
Career total			154	38	12	2	7	1	9	1	182	42
