= Jason Pope =

English footballer

Personal information
- Full name: Jason Warren Pope
- Date of birth: 20 September 1995 (age 31)
- Place of birth: Exeter, England
- Positions: Defender; midfielder

Team information
- Current team: Weston-super-Mare

Youth career
- 2003–2014: Exeter City

Senior career*
Years	Team	Apps	(Gls)
2014–2016	Exeter City	0	(0)
2015–2016	→ Weston-super-Mare (loan)	19	(0)
2016–2019	Weston-super-Mare	117	(0)
2019–2020	Hereford	29	(2)
2020–2021	Bath City	7	(0)
2021–	Weston-super-Mare	163	(4)
- * Club domestic league appearances and goals as of 20:56, 5 May 2026 (UTC)

Jason Warren Pope (born 20 September 1995) is an English professional footballer who plays as a defender and midfielder for National League South club Weston-super-Mare.

== Club career ==
Pope joined Exeter City's youth setup in 2003, aged eight. He then progressed through the Academy team, and was awarded a professional deal on 14 April 2014.

Pope made his first-team debut on 7 October, replacing Scot Bennett in a 1–3 Football League Trophy away loss against Coventry City.

On 17 July 2015, Pope, along with Alex Byrne, joined Weston-super-Mare on a six-month youth loan.

Pope was released by Exeter City on 13 May 2016 He later rejoined Weston-super-Mare for the 2016–17 season.

On 26 June 2019 he joined National League North club Hereford.

== Career statistics ==
As of match played 2 May 2026

Appearances and goals by club, season and competition
Club	Season	League			National Cup		League Cup		Other		Total	
Club	Season	Division	Apps	Goals	Apps	Goals	Apps	Goals	Apps	Goals	Apps	Goals
Exeter City	2014–15	League Two	0	0	0	0	0	0	1 (Note: Appearance in the Football League Trophy)	0	1	0
Exeter City	2015–16	League Two	0	0	0	0	0	0	0	0	0	0
Exeter City	Total		0	0	0	0	0	0	1	0	1	0
Weston-super-Mare (loan)	2015–16	National League South	19	0	1	0	—		5 (Note: Three appearances in the FA Trophy, two appearances and one goal in Somerset Premier Cup)	1	25	1
Weston-super-Mare	2016–17	National League South	41	0	1	0	—		5 (Note: One appearance in the FA Trophy and four in the Somerset Premier Cup)	0	47	0
Weston-super-Mare	2017–18	National League South	42	0	1	0	—		7 (Note: Three appearances in the FA Trophy and four appearances and one goal in Somerset Premier Cup)	1	50	1
Weston-super-Mare	2018–19	National League South	34	0	4	0	—		4 (Note: Two appearances in the FA Trophy and two appearances in Somerset Premier Cup)	0	42	0
Weston-super-Mare	Total		117	0	6	0	—		16	1	139	1
Hereford	2019–20	National League North	29	2	2	0	—		2 (Note: Appearance(s) in the FA Trophy)	0	33	2
Bath City	2020–21	National League South	7	0	2	0	—		2	0	11	0
Weston-super-Mare	2021–22	Southern League Premier Division South	37	2	4	1	—		5 (Note: Two appearances in the Southern League Cup and two appearances in Somerset Premier Cup, one appearance in Southern League Premier Division South play-offs)	0	46	3
Weston-super-Mare	2022–23	Southern League Premier Division South	31	1	0	0	—		2 (Note: One appearance in the FA Trophy, one appearance in Somerset Premier Cup)	0	33	1
Weston-super-Mare	2023–24	National League South	46	1	3	0	—		4 (Note: Two appearances in the FA Trophy, two appearances and one goal in Somerset Premier Cup)	1	53	2
Weston-super-Mare	2024–25	National League South	20	0	5	0	—		1	0	26	0
Weston-super-Mare	2025–26	National League South	29	0	4	0	—		2 (Note: Appearances in National League South play-offs)	0	35	0
Weston-super-Mare	Total		163	4	16	1	—		14	1	193	6
Career total			336	6	27	1	0	0	40	3	403	10
