= George Robesten =

Scottish footballer (born 2005)

Personal information
- Date of birth: 11 November 2005 (age 20)
- Place of birth: Eastbourne, East Sussex, England
- Position: Forward

Team information
- Current team: Weston-super-Mare
- Number: 22

Youth career
- 2021–2022: Ross County

Senior career*
Years	Team	Apps	(Gls)
2022–2026	Ross County	12	(0)
2023–2024	→ Nairn County (loan)	22	(3)
2024	→ Clachnacuddin (loan)	5	(2)
2024–2025	→ Brora Rangers (loan)	7	(5)
2025–2026	→ Strathspey Thistle (loan)	4	(0)
2026–	Weston-super-Mare	0	(0)
- * Club domestic league appearances and goals as of 7 January 2026

George Robesten (born 11 November 2005) is an English footballer who plays as a midfielder for National League South club Weston-super-Mare.

== Career ==
=== Amateur ===
As a child, Robesten played amateur rugby in Eastbourne. He began playing football around the age of 12 or 13.

During his teenage years, Robesten played for Shetland Football League team TSB (Trondra, Scalloway & Burra). It was while playing for TSB, he caught the eye of the Ross County scouting team, marking the beginning of his professional career.

=== Ross County ===
Robesten joined the club at Under 18 level after being scouted whilst playing for a Ross County football camp in Shetland.

Robesten signed his first full-time deal on 23 June 2022.

Robesten made his debut for Ross County on 10 August 2024 in the 83' minute in a 1–1 draw against Dundee United.

=== Loans ===
Robesten joined Nairn County on loan in July 2023 originally until January before it being extended until the end of the season. On 23 February 2024, Robesten's loan was cut short due to injury forcing him to be recalled.

On 18 March 2024, Robesten joined Clachnacuddin on loan until the end of the season.

On 30 August 2024, Robesten agreed to join Brora Rangers on a season-long loan.

On 9 October 2025, Robesten joined Strathspey Thistle on loan but was eventually recalled in January 2026.

=== Weston-super-Mare ===
On 2 January 2026 Robesten signed for National League South club Weston-super-Mare.

== Personal life ==
George Robesten was born in Eastbourne in England before moving to the Shetland Islands with his family aged 13.

== Honours ==
Shetland Island Young Sportsman of the Year 2023 - WINNER

Nairn County

- North of Scotland Cup: 2023–24
