= Louis Britton =

English footballer

Personal information
- Full name: Louis Sidney Britton
- Date of birth: 17 March 2001 (age 25)
- Place of birth: Bristol, England
- Height: 1.93 m (6 ft 4 in)
- Position: Forward

Team information
- Current team: Weston-super-Mare

Youth career
- AEK Boco
- –2017: Bath City

Senior career*
Years	Team	Apps	(Gls)
2017	Cadbury Heath	6	(1)
2017–2018	Brislington	25	(12)
2018–2019	Mangotsfield United	23	(15)
2018	→ Brislington (loan)	8	(4)
2019–2022	Bristol City	1	(1)
2019	→ Yate Town (loan)	9	(4)
2019–2020	→ Bath City (loan)	10	(1)
2020	→ Torquay United (loan)	5	(1)
2020–2021	→ Stockport County (loan)	4	(0)
2021–2022	→ Woking (loan)	4	(0)
2022	→ Waterford (loan)	18	(10)
2022	Cork City	9	(0)
2022–2023	Yeovil Town	3	(0)
2023–2024	Chorley	10	(1)
2023	→ Marine (dual registration)	6	(4)
2023–2024	→ Maldon & Tiptree (loan)	14	(13)
2024	Maldon & Tiptree	10	(5)
2024–2025	Bristol Manor Farm	35	(28)
2025–	Weston-super-Mare	51	(18)
- * Club domestic league appearances and goals as of 20:12, 3 May 2026 (UTC)

Louis Sidney Britton (born 17 March 2001) is an English footballer who plays as a forward for National League South club Weston-super-Mare.

== Career ==
Originally starting out with AEK Boco and then Bath City, Britton had spells with Cadbury Heath and Brislington before making the move to Mangotsfield United ahead of the 2018–19 campaign. After a successful debut season, he transferred to Bristol City on 18 April 2019. He returned to Bath City on loan for the 2019–20 season. In the 2020-21 season, he had brief loans at Torquay United, and Stockport County before returning to Bristol City. he had Britton made his professional debut with Bristol City in a 3–1 EFL Championship loss to Brentford on 8 May 2021; coming on as a late sub in the 72nd minute, Britton scored his side's only goal in the 87th minute on his debut.

On 2 December 2021, Britton returned to the National League to join mid-table, Woking on a months loan.

On 1 February 2022, Britton signed for League of Ireland First Division club Waterford on loan until the end of June.

On 4 May 2022, it was announced that Britton would leave Bristol City at the end of his contract in June.

On 29 June 2022, Britton signed for Cork City on a permanent basis following his release from Bristol City, after impressing during his loan spell at rivals Waterford, for whom he scored 10 goals in 17 games. Britton was on the receiving end of abusive messages and threats from Waterford fans on social media following the move to their rivals.

On 11 November 2022, Britton signed for National League side Yeovil Town on a free transfer. On 6 January 2023, Britton left Yeovil via mutual consent having played four times, scoring once.

On 8 January 2023, Britton signed for National League North side Chorley. He signed for Marine on dual registration on 16 January 2023. He was part of the Marine team which won the 2023 Liverpool Senior Cup.

In September 2023, Britton joined Isthmian League Premier Division club Maldon & Tiptree on loan. Following an impressive loan spell, he made the move permanent in January 2024.

In August 2024, Britton joined Southern League Division One South side Bristol Manor Farm. In March 2025, he joined National League South side Weston-super-Mare.

== Personal life ==
Britton's father, Geoff Britton, was a semi-pro footballer in non-league teams in England. Britton apprenticed as a painter before signing his professional contract with Bristol City. He is a childhood fan of Manchester City.

== Career statistics ==
As of end of 2025–26 season

Appearances and goals by club, season and competition
Club	Season	League			National cup (Note: Includes FAI Cup, FA Cup)		League cup (Note: Includes League of Ireland Cup, EFL Cup)		Other		Total	
Club	Season	Division	Apps	Goals	Apps	Goals	Apps	Goals	Apps	Goals	Apps	Goals
Cadbury Heath	2016–17	Western League Premier Division	5	1	—		—		—		5	1
Cadbury Heath	2017–18	Western League Premier Division	1	0	0	0	—		0	0	1	0
Cadbury Heath	Total		6	1	0	0	—		0	0	6	1
Brislington	2017–18	Western League Premier Division	25	12	—		—		3 (Note: Appearances in Les Phillips Cup)	1	28	13
Mangotsfield United	2018–19	SL Division One South	23	15	1	0	—		4 (Note: Two appearances in FA Trophy, one appearance in Southern League Cup, one appearance in Gloucestershire Senior Cup)	0	28	15
Brislington (loan)	2018–19	Western League Premier Division	8	4	—		—		1 (Note: Appearance in FA Vase)	0	9	4
Bristol City	2018–19	Championship	0	0	0	0	0	0	—		0	0
Bristol City	2019–20	Championship	0	0	0	0	0	0	—		0	0
Bristol City	2020–21	Championship	1	1	0	0	0	0	—		1	1
Bristol City	2021–22	Championship	0	0	0	0	0	0	—		0	0
Bristol City	Total		1	1	0	0	0	0	—		1	1
Yate Town (loan)	2019–20	SL Premier Division South	9	4	0	0	—		6 (Note: Four appearances and six goals in FA Trophy, two appearances and one goal in Southern League Cup)	7	15	11
Bath City (loan)	2019–20	National League South	10	1	0	0	—		0	0	10	1
Torquay United (loan)	2020–21	National League	5	1	0	0	—		0	0	5	1
Stockport County (loan)	2020–21	National League	4	0	1	0	—		1 (Note: Appearance(s) in FA Trophy)	0	4	0
Woking (loan)	2021–22	National League	4	0	—		—		0	0	4	0
Waterford (loan)	2022	League of Ireland First Division	18	10	—		—		0	0	18	10
Cork City	2022	League of Ireland First Division	9	0	1	0	—		—		10	0
Yeovil Town	2022–23	National League	3	0	—		—		1 (Note: Appearance in Somerset Premier Cup)	1	4	1
Chorley	2022–23	National League North	3	0	—		—		—		3	0
Chorley	2023–24	National League North	7	1	0	0	—		0	0	7	1
Chorley	Total		10	1	0	0	—		0	0	10	1
Marine (loan)	2022–23	NPL Premier Division	6	4	—		—		3 (Note: Appearances in Liverpool Senior Cup)	4	9	8
Maldon & Tiptree (loan)	2023–24	Isthmian League North Division	14	13	0	0	—		1 (Note: Appearance(s) in Essex County Cup)	0	15	13
Maldon & Tiptree	2023–24	Isthmian League North Division	10	5	0	0	—		1	0	11	5
Maldon & Tiptree	Total		24	18	0	0	—		2	0	26	18
Bristol Manor Farm	2024–25	SL Division One South	35	28	1	1	—		8 (Note: Four appearances and four goals in FA Trophy, four appearances and four goals in Gloucestershire Senior Cup)	8	44	37
Weston-super-Mare	2024–25	National League South	6	0	—		—		—		6	0
Weston-super-Mare	2025–26	National League South	45	18	7	6	—		4 (Note: Two appearances in FA Trophy, two appearances and one goal in National League South play-offs)	1	56	25
Weston-super-Mare	Total		51	18	7	6	—		4	1	62	25
Career total			251	118	11	7	0	0	33	22	295	147

== Honours ==
Individual

- National League South Player of the Month: August 2025
