= Jacob Cane =

English footballer (born 1994)

Personal information
- Full name: Jacob Jagger Cane
- Date of birth: 20 May 1994 (age 32)
- Place of birth: Exeter, England
- Position: Midfielder

Team information
- Current team: Weston-super-Mare

Youth career
- –2012: Exeter City

Senior career*
Years	Team	Apps	(Gls)
2012–2014	Exeter City	1	(0)
2013	→ Poole Town (loan)	14	(2)
2013	→ Poole Town (loan)	5	(0)
2014	→ Weymouth (loan)	11	(0)
2014–2019	Weston-super-Mare	175	(14)
2019–2020	Hereford	20	(0)
2019–2020	→ Weston-super-Mare (loan)	9	(0)
2020–	Weston-super-Mare	165	(9)
- * Club domestic league appearances and goals as of 23:29, 10 January 2026 (UTC)

Jacob Jagger Cane (born 20 May 1994) is an English footballer who plays as a midfielder for National League South club Weston-super-Mare.

== Playing career ==
Cane came through the youth side at Exeter City, and was given his first professional contract in April 2012. Five others also were given contracts as youth coach Simon Hayward noted that "the Under-18s this year have probably been the best we've ever had"; the side reached the final of the Youth Alliance Cup in 2012. He made his senior debut for the "Grecians" on 18 September 2012, coming on as an 89th-minute substitute for Tommy Doherty in a 3–2 win over Wycombe Wanderers in a League Two fixture at St James Park. At the end of the 2013–14 season, Cane was released by Exeter City.

After leaving the Grecians, Jacob joined Weston-Super-Mare, and spent the next five season's playing for the club.

On 26 June 2019, Cane joined National League North club Hereford. On 7 November, Jagger-Cane rejoined Weston-Super-Mare on a month's loan The deal was later extended until January 2020. He returned to Hereford on 14 January 2020.

== Career statistics ==
As of match played 10 January 2026

Appearances and goals by club, season and competition
Club	Season	League			FA Cup		EFL Cup		Other		Total	
Club	Season	Division	Apps	Goals	Apps	Goals	Apps	Goals	Apps	Goals	Apps	Goals
Exeter City	2012–13	League Two	1	0	0	0	0	0	0	0	1	0
Exeter City	2013–14	League Two	0	0	0	0	0	0	0	0	0	0
Exeter City	Total		1	0	0	0	0	0	0	0	1	0
Poole Town (loan)	2012–13	SFL Div 1, South & West	14	2	0	0	—		1	0	15	2
Poole Town (loan)	2013–14	SFL Premier Division	5	0	2	0	—		0	0	7	0
Weymouth (loan)	2013–14	SFL Premier Division	11	0	0	0	—		0	0	11	0
Weston-super-Mare	2014–15	Conference South	36	2	3	0	—		0	0	39	2
Weston-super-Mare	2015–16	National League South	37	1	2	0	—		2 (Note: Appearances in FA Trophy)	0	41	1
Weston-super-Mare	2016–17	National League South	26	3	0	0	—		3 (Note: One appearance in FA Trophy, two appearances in Somerset Premier Cup)	0	29	3
Weston-super-Mare	2017–18	National League South	39	3	1	0	—		7 (Note: Four appearances in FA Trophy, three appearances in Somerset Premier Cup)	0	47	3
Weston-super-Mare	2018–19	National League South	37	5	4	0	—		4 (Note: Two appearances in FA Trophy, two appearances in Somerset Premier Cup)	0	45	5
Weston-super-Mare	Total		175	14	10	0	—		16	0	201	14
Hereford	2019–20	National League South	20	0	2	0	—		1 (Note: Appearance in Herefordshire Senior Cup)	1	23	1
Weston-super-Mare (loan)	2019–20	SFL Premier Division South	9	0	0	0	—		1 (Note: Appearance in Somerset Premier Cup)	0	10	0
Weston-super-Mare	2020–21	SFL Premier Division South	6	0	4	1	—		2	0	12	1
Weston-super-Mare	2021–22	SFL Premier Division South	32	1	4	0	—		5 (Note: One appearance in FA Trophy, three appearances in Southern League Cup, one appearance in Somerset Premier Cup)	0	41	1
Weston-super-Mare	2022–23	SFL Premier Division South	42	2	4	0	—		2	0	48	2
Weston-super-Mare	2023–24	National League South	38	5	2	0	—		5 (Note: Three appearances in FA Trophy, two appearances in Somerset Premier Cup)	0	45	5
Weston-super-Mare	2024–25	National League South	33	0	4	0	—		2 (Note: One appearance in FA Trophy, one appearance in Somerset Premier Cup)	0	39	0
Weston-super-Mare	2025–26	National League South	14	1	6	0	—		0	0	20	1
Weston-super-Mare	Total		165	9	24	1	—		16	0	205	10
Career total			400	25	38	1	0	0	35	0	475	26
