= Alex Byrne (footballer, born 1997) =

English footballer

Personal information
- Full name: Alex John Byrne
- Date of birth: 5 February 1997 (age 29)
- Place of birth: Barnstaple, England
- Height: 5 ft 9 in (1.75 m)
- Position: Midfielder

Senior career*
Years	Team	Apps	(Gls)
2015–2018	Exeter City	2	(0)
2015–2016	→ Weston-super-Mare	27	(0)
2017	→ Truro City	3	(0)
2018–2019	Weston-super-Mare	38	(1)
2019–	Bideford	15	(2)
- * Club domestic league appearances and goals as of 23 August 2020

Alex John Byrne (born 5 February 1997) is an English footballer who plays for Bideford.

== Career ==
Byrne began his career with Exeter City and made his professional debut for the Grecians on 13 August 2016 in a 2–1 defeat against Hartlepool United. He had spent the previous season on loan at Weston-super-Mare. He spent some of the 2016–17 season on loan at Truro City.

He made his second overall appearance for the Grecians first team came almost a year later in Exeter's 1–2 EFL Cup loss to Charlton Athletic, and made his second league appearance for Exeter as a late substitute on 11 November 2017.

Byrne was released by Exeter at the end of the 2017–18 season. He re-joined Weston-super-Mare in August 2018 following a successful trial, making his debut in the Seagulls' loss to Wealdstone on the opening day of the 2018–19 season. On 10 October 2019 the club announced that Byrne had left the club.
