= Scott Rogers (football manager) =

English football manager

Managerial career
- Years: Team
- Blackburn Rovers
- Liverpool FC Women
- Accrington Stanley F.C.

Scott Rogers is an English professional football manager, who is currently one of the first team coaches for Manchester United Women's team. Previously he was assistant manager at Liverpool F.C Women and head of coaching at Accrington Stanley F.C boys academy. He has managed the Liverpool previously, as well as the women's teams of Blackburn Rovers as an assistant of coach, Liverpool FC Women. After being fired from Liverpool in 2018, Chris Kirkland took over the side.

== Honours ==
Liverpool Women

- FA Women's Super League: 2012–13, 2013–14
