= Owen Johnson =

Owen Johnson may refer to:

- Owen Johnson (writer) (1878–1952), American writer
- Owen H. Johnson (1929–2014), New York State Senator
- Owen Johnson (dendrologist), British dendrologist
- Owen Johnson (footballer) (1919–2001), English footballer
