= Luke Coulson =

English footballer

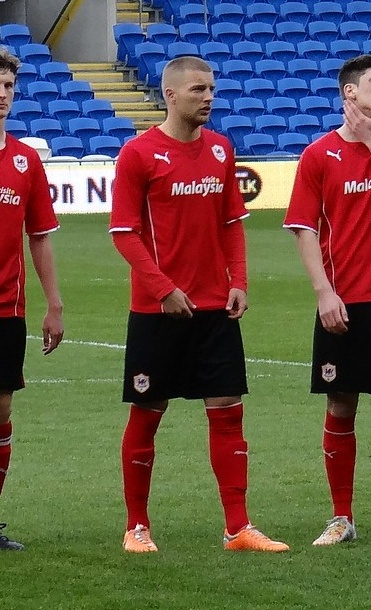
- Coulson playing for Cardiff City's development team in 2014

Personal information
- Full name: Luke Coulson
- Date of birth: 6 March 1994 (age 32)
- Place of birth: St Helens, England
- Height: 1.79 m (5 ft 10 1/2 in)
- Position: Winger

Team information
- Current team: Weston-super-Mare
- Number: 7

Youth career
- 2002–2012: Manchester City

College career
Years	Team	Apps	(Gls)
2012	Michigan Wolverines	6	(1)

Senior career*
Years	Team	Apps	(Gls)
2012–2014	Cardiff City	0	(0)
2015–2016	Oxford City	40	(8)
2016–2017	Eastleigh	36	(8)
2017	Barnet	11	(0)
2017–2018	Ebbsfleet United	61	(9)
2018–2022	Bromley	123	(10)
2022–2024	Dartford	84	(17)
2024–	Weston-super-Mare	87	(27)
- * Club domestic league appearances and goals as of 17:10, 2 May 2026 (UTC)

Luke Coulson (born 6 March 1994) is an English footballer who plays as a winger for National League South club Weston-super-Mare.

== Career ==
Coulson was in the academy at Manchester City for ten years while attending school at The Sutton Academy, before enrolling as a student at the University of Michigan, playing for the Michigan Wolverines team. He left after a month reportedly to sign for an English Premier League club – he played a reserve game for Stoke City in October 2012 – before signing for Cardiff City of the Championship in November 2012.

He made his debut for Cardiff as a substitute in an FA Cup defeat against Macclesfield Town on 5 January 2013. His contract was extended to the end of the 2013–14 season. Despite making no further first-team appearances, he was offered a new deal to keep him at the club beyond 2013–14, but rejected the offer to find first-team football elsewhere.

Later that year Coulson had trials at Hibernian and Ipswich Town before signing for Oxford City in January 2015. His performances attracted the attention of professional clubs, going on trial at Crewe Alexandra in October 2015, before joining Eastleigh in January 2016 – a new record signing for the Spitfires. Coulson was called up to the England C squad in October 2016, but turned down the call up so he could play in Eastleigh's televised FA Cup first round tie against Swindon Town, a tie which the Spitfires won after a replay.

After six goals in the first half of the 2016–17 season, Coulson joined Barnet in January 2017 for a club record sale fee – this time a record sale for Eastleigh.

He made his Football League debut for the Bees as a substitute against Newport County on 21 January 2017.

After only 11 appearances, Coulson joined Ebbsfleet United for an undisclosed fee on 13 July 2017. On his competitive debut for Ebbsfleet, Coulson assisted both goals in a 2–2 draw with Guiseley. In the following game he opened the scoring in a 2–0 win against Maidstone United.

Coulson joined Bromley in December 2018.

On 28 June 2022, it was announced that Coulson was leaving Bromley after three–and–a–half seasons at the club.

On 15 July 2022, Coulson joined Dartford.

On 8 June 2023, it was confirmed that Coulson had committed to stay at Dartford for the 2023–24 season.

On 30 April 2024, it was announced the Coulson would leave Dartford following the expiration of his contract.

On 5 May 2024, Coulson signed for Weston-super-Mare. On 29 March 2025, he scored his first hat-trick for the club against Hornchurch, the third of which was scored from inside his own penalty area.

== Personal life ==
Coulson has a degree in sports writing and broadcasting from Staffordshire University.

Coulson's brother Sam (born 1995) was also in the academy at Manchester City before joining Stoke City. He retired in May 2015 due to a recurring knee injury.

== Career statistics ==
As of 2 May 2026

Club	Season	League			FA Cup		League Cup		Other		Total	
Club	Season	Division	Apps	Goals	Apps	Goals	Apps	Goals	Apps	Goals	Apps	Goals
Cardiff City	2012–13	Championship	0	0	1	0	0	0	—		1	0
Cardiff City	2013–14	Premier League	0	0	0	0	0	0	—		0	0
Cardiff City	Total		0	0	1	0	0	0	0	0	1	0
Oxford City	2014–15	Conference North	17	2	0	0	—		0	0	17	2
Oxford City	2015–16	National League South	23	6	0	0	—		3	1	26	7
Oxford City	Total		40	8	0	0	0	0	3	1	43	9
Eastleigh	2015–16	National League	16	2	0	0	—		0	0	16	2
Eastleigh	2016–17	National League	20	6	6	0	—		0	0	26	6
Eastleigh	Total		36	8	6	0	0	0	0	0	42	8
Barnet	2016–17	League Two	11	0	0	0	0	0	0	0	11	0
Ebbsfleet United	2017–18	National League	46	9	3	1	—		5	1	54	11
Ebbsfleet United	2018–19	National League	15	0	3	2	—		0	0	18	2
Ebbsfleet United	Total		61	9	6	3	0	0	5	1	72	13
Bromley	2018–19	National League	24	5	0	0	—		1	0	25	5
Bromley	2019–20	National League	38	3	3	0	—		1	0	42	3
Bromley	2020–21	National League	25	1	1	0	—		1	0	27	1
Bromley	2021–22	National League	36	1	2	0	—		3	0	41	1
Bromley	Total		123	10	6	0	0	0	6	0	135	10
Dartford	2022–23	National League South	39	7	1	0	—		3 (Note: One appearance in the London Senior Cup) (Note: One appearance in the FA Trophy) (Note: One appearance in the National League South Play-Offs)	0	43	7
Dartford	2023–24	National League South	45	10	1	0	—		6 (Note: Four appearances in the London Senior Cup) (Note: One appearance in the FA Trophy) (Note: One appearance in the Kent Senior Cup)	2	52	12
Dartford	Total		84	17	2	0	0	0	9	2	95	19
Weston-super-Mare	2024–25	National League South	44	20	2	2	—		0	0	46	22
Weston-super-Mare	2025–26	National League South	43	7	4	1	—		3 (Note: One appearance in the FA Trophy) (Note: Two appearances in the National League South play-offs)	0	50	8
Weston-super-Mare	Total		87	27	6	3	0	0	3	0	96	30
Career total			442	79	27	6	0	0	26	4	495	89

== Honours ==
Bromley

- FA Trophy: 2021–22

Individual

- Bromley Player of the Year: 2019–20
- National League South Team of the Season: 2024–25
