= Weston-super-Mare A.F.C. =

Association football club in England

Coordinates: 51°19′50.36″N 2°57′21.71″W

Weston-super-Mare
- Full name: Weston-super-Mare Association Football Club
- Nickname: The Seagulls
- Founded: 1887; 139 years ago
- Ground: Woodspring Stadium
- Capacity: 3,500 (350 seated)
- Chairman: Oli Bliss
- Manager: Scott Rogers
- League: National League South
- 2025–26: National League South, 6th of 24
- Website: wsmafc.co.uk
| Home colours | Away colours | Third colours |

Weston-super-Mare Association Football Club are a semi-professional football club based in Weston-super-Mare, North Somerset, England. Nicknamed "The Seagulls", the club are affiliated to the Somerset County Football Association and are competing in the National League South, the sixth tier of English football.

The club was founded in 1887 but disbanded twice (for the two World Wars); the current club was established in 1948. Their claim to fame was that they had never been relegated in their history, although after their promotion to the sixth tier in 2004, they had been reprieved from relegation three times (in 2007, 2008, and 2010). They were eventually relegated for the first time in 132 years in the 2018–19 season. The team's best performance in the FA Cup came in 2025–26 when they reached the third round of the competition.

Weston-super-Mare has a modest fan base and a fierce rivalry with fellow North Somerset club Clevedon Town. However, the two clubs have not played in the same league or cup (excluding pre-season) since Weston-super-Mare gained promotion to the Southern League Premier Division in 2003.

== History ==
=== Formation, reformation, and early history ===
Weston-super-Mare A.F.C. was formed in 1887. The team's first record of a competitive match being against near-neighbours Clevedon Town in a "Medal Competition" organised by the Somerset FA. In 1900, they joined Division two of the Western Football League but left after two years. In 1910, they rejoined this league and played there until World War I.

Between the wars, the club played in the local Bristol and District Football League and then the Somerset County League but the club disbanded upon the outbreak of hostilities in 1939. The club reformed in 1948 and immediately rejoined the Western League, initially in Division Two. At this time the team played at the Great Ground in Locking Road, where initially there was no cover for spectators and the players had to change in a marquee. A season after the club joined rejoined the Western League they made their debut in the FA Cup in the 1949–50 season losing to Gloucester City in the preliminary qualifying round. The team remained in the Second Division until the league consolidated to a single division in 1960. During this time they moved to the Langford Road Ground. In 1976, they were placed into the Western League Premier Division upon the creation of a second tier, meaning that by their centenary in 1987 they had never been promoted or relegated in their history.

=== Paul Bliss era ===
In early 1986, Paul Bliss was approached by Weston-super-Mare and he was named as the club's chairman roughly six months later. In 1989, John Ellener was appointed manager and led the club to the Western League championship in 1991–92 and with it promotion to the Southern League Midland Division. They remained at this level, playing successively in the Midland, Southern, Midland (again) and Western Divisions due to the Southern League's regular reorganisations, until 2002–03 when they finished in second place and were promoted to the Premier Division, clinching promotion with a win away to rivals Clevedon Town. In their first Premier Division season they finished in 10th place, enough to clinch a place in the newly formed Conference South.

The club's most successful FA Cup run came in the 2003–04 season, when the Seagulls reached the second round. After defeating Dorchester Town, Chesham United (via a replay) and Welling United in the qualifying rounds, Weston secured a 1–0 away win against Farnborough Town to progress from the first round. They were awarded an away tie against Third Division side, Northampton Town where they were eventually beaten 4–1. In the same season, Weston would equal their best performance in the FA Trophy, reaching the Fourth Round of the competition.

In the 2006–07 season of the Conference South, the club finished in 20th position and was set to be relegated. However, Farnborough Town were relegated due to going into liquidation and Hayes and Yeading merged to form Hayes & Yeading United, leaving the Conference South one team short, earning a reprieve for Weston. The 2007–08 season ended similarly for Weston. A 20th-place finish meant the club was eligible for relegation, only to be spared by the enforced demotion of Cambridge City, who failed a ground inspection. The 2009–10 campaign again saw the club finish in the relegation zone again when they finished 21st, however as before the club was saved by the FA, this time when Salisbury City were demoted twice to the Southern League.

The 2010–11 season saw the club win the Somerset Premier Cup for the first time when they defeated Yeovil Town in the final. The club retained the cup the following season (2011–12) when they beat local rivals Clevedon Town 2–1.

In 2012–13, the club finished the season with their highest-ever placing at the time in the Conference South in 7th place with 67 points and narrowly missing out on a place in the playoffs. The 2014–15 season brought a relatively successful cup campaign as the Seagulls won three qualifying matches in the FA Cup and reached the First Round Proper of the FA Cup, where they lost 4–1 at home to Doncaster Rovers in front of a record attendance of 2,949.

After a string of poor results, Micky Bell was replaced by Director of Football, Ryan Northmore at the end of November 2014 with the Seagulls at the bottom of the table. Northmore took the team on a string of unbeaten games, taking them to promotion-challenging form. Unfortunately, this didn't continue, and after defeating Bath City at home 4–1 in a rearranged fixture the rejuvenated Seagulls didn't win another league game which saw them finish 17th.

The 2015–16 season saw the side struggle to gain a win throughout August in the League, winning just 1 point from 18, with that point coming at home in the Somerset Derby against Bath City. Through September and October, the side couldn't maintain a consistent run of form and continued to lay low in the dreaded depths of the relegation zone. However, toward the end of November, Ryan Northmore's troops pulled themselves up to 2nd in the league's form table by going 10 games unbeaten in the Nation League South from 21 November until 16 February. It ended when Weston couldn't maintain the run, losing 2–0 to Hayes & Yeading at the Woodspring.

The side momentarily lost form with losses coming against St. Albans and Wealdstone however, over the Easter weekend, the side bagged an important 3 points over Ebbsfleet thanks to Captain Dayle Grubb's impressive strikes. This was followed by a tough defeat to relegation rivals Bath City, with Scott Wilson firing in during the 91st minute, but Bath hit back with a penalty in the 92nd minute and the winner from halfway in the 94th minute.

During the last month of the season, the Seagulls once again turned on the style and ended the season with 6 unbeaten games from 7, with Scott Wilson and Dayle Grubb netting in a 2–0 win over Maidstone to spark manic celebrations from the home fans at The Woodspring knowing that the Seagulls had avoided relegation with the season ending in a party atmosphere in Havant on 30 April, with fan favourite Scott Wilson sliding home at the far post to ultimately send Havant down and keep Margate down.

The club revealed a new crest after the end of the 2015–16 season. Manager Ryan Northmore was sacked by the club on 18 September 2016 after a run of seven league losses and an FA Cup exit to North Leigh Northmore was replaced by former Weston-super-Mare player and Forest Green Rovers caretaker manager Scott Bartlett on 3 October 2016. Bartlett left the club at the end of the 2016–17 season after having led the Seagulls to 15th in the National League South. Former player Marc McGregor was his replacement for the new season.

McGregor's first season in charge saw the club finish in a credible 12th place with McGregor being named Manager of the Month for November. The 2018–19 season saw the club struggle for form, only picking up their first league win three months into the season with their first home league win coming nearly three months later. McGregor's time in charge came to an end in March 2019 with the club ultimately suffering the first relegation in their 137-year history finishing bottom of the National League South. Scott Bartlett returned as the club's new manager ahead of the 2019–20 season.

The club's first two seasons (2019–20 and 2020–21) back in the Southern Football League were abandoned prematurely due to the COVID-19 pandemic. The 2021–22 season saw Weston finish the season in fifth place, qualifying for the end of season playoffs but the Seagulls lost their semi-final 2–1 against Hayes and Yeading United to confirm their continued participation in the Southern League.

The 2022–23 season saw Weston immediately challenging at the top of the table, spending much of the season battling with Truro City for the top spot and, despite a late challenge from Bracknell Town, Weston were crowned champions following an emphatic 4–1 win against Hendon securing a return to the National League South after four years.

A respectable 13th-place finish was the result of the Seagulls' first season back in the sixth tier. In January 2024, Bartlett signed a new long-term contract. Weston started the following season impressively, with a 15 game unbeaten run seeing the Seagulls sitting at the top of the league in mid-November. However, a 10 game winless streak followed and saw them drop out of championship contention. Ultimately, they finished in eighth place, four points off the play-offs but this did represent their highest finish in the football pyramid since 2013. The season also featured a run to the FA Cup first round and a short trip up the M5 where they were defeated by Bristol Rovers 3–1 after extra time.

Scott Bartlett left the club in September 2025 to take up the vacant managerial role at National League side Eastleigh, being replaced by his former assistant Scott Rogers. The 2025–26 season would prove to be the best in the club's history. In January, the club competed in the third round of the FA Cup for the first time in their history, narrowly being beaten by League Two side Grimsby Town at Blundell Park Weston ended the season in sixth, their highest ever finish, qualifying for the play-offs. They defeated Hemel Hempstead Town on penalties in the quarter-final before losing out to eventual winners Hornchurch in the semi-final.

== Ground ==
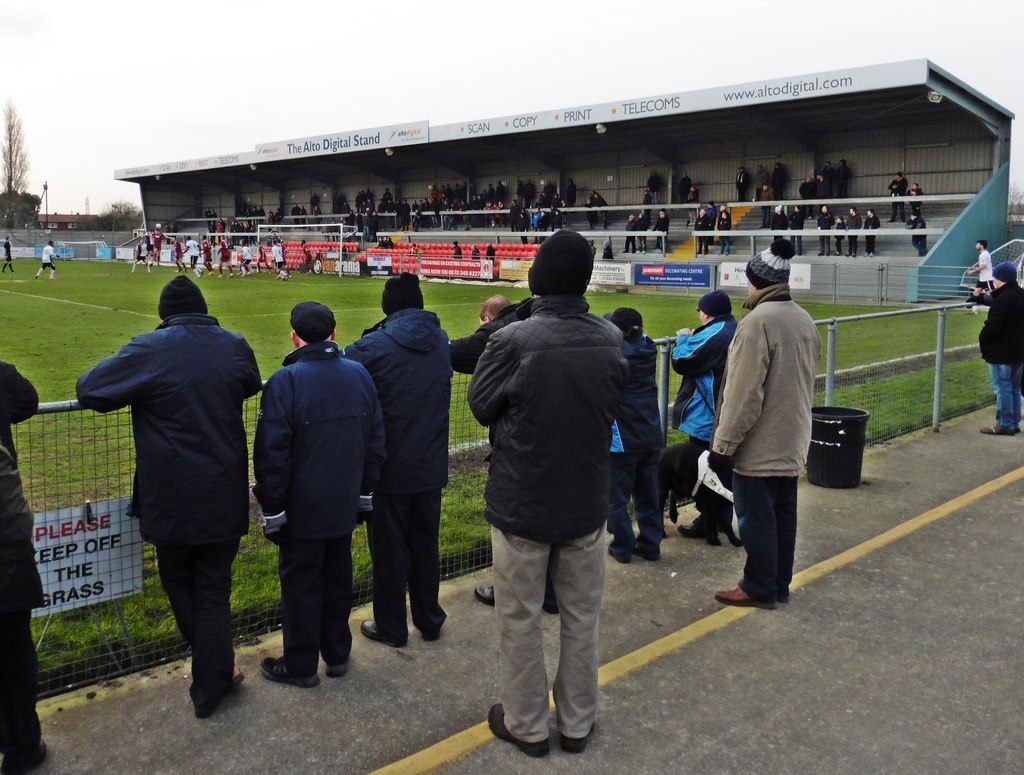
Woodspring Stadium

Weston-super-Mare have played their home games at the Woodspring Stadium (currently known as the Optima Stadium for sponsorship reasons) on Winterstoke Road since August 2004. They previously played at nearby Woodspring Park. The move marked the third time in 40 years that Weston-super-Mare had moved ground. The ground's capacity is 3,500, of which 350 are seated and 2,000 are under covered terrace.

Woodspring Park had been built almost entirely by supporters and features a £100,000 clubhouse. The Park had been the home of Weston-super-Mare since 1983 and had floodlights installed in 1986. The ground nearly had a greyhound track around the pitch, an idea that chairman Paul Bliss vetoed. Weston-super-Mare sold this ground to a residential home builder when it became apparent the club would move the short distance to the Woodspring Stadium. The last home fixture was played in April 2004.

The site of Woodspring Stadium was formerly a sporting complex owned by Westland Aircraft known as Westland Sports Ground. It was home to cricket and football in addition to social buildings. Difficult financial times forced Westland to reconsider its place in town and put the ground up for sale. The club purchased it for £270,000 in 2001. The Stadium opened on 14 August 2004, with its first match against Conference South opponents Hornchurch attended by 500 people.

In April 2021, the club announced plans to redevelop the stadium to include 750 additional seats and new terracing plus new club facilities and hospitality areas. The redevelopment would also allow the club the ability to increase capacity at the ground to 5,000 with 2,000 seats. This would allow the ground to host EFL League Two matches should the club ever be promoted to that level. Planning permission was granted for the redevelopment in November 2025 with an expected start date in early 2027.

The record attendance for this ground was 2,949, set during an FA Cup first round replay against Doncaster Rovers on 18 November 2014.

== Current squad ==
Updated 12 September 2026

Note: Flags indicate national team as defined under FIFA eligibility rules; some limited exceptions apply. Players may hold more than one non-FIFA nationality.

| No. | Pos. | Nation | Player |
|---|---|---|---|
| 1 | GK | ENG | Max Harris |
| 2 | DF | NIR | Michael Smith |
| 4 | MF | ENG | Jacob Jagger Cane |
| 5 | DF | WAL | Emlyn Lewis (captain) |
| 6 | DF | ENG | Sam Avery |
| 7 | MF | ENG | Luke Coulson (vice-captain) |
| 8 | MF | ENG | James Dodd |
| 9 | FW | ENG | Louis Britton |
| 10 | FW | ENG | Ollie Hulbert |
| 11 | MF | ENG | Will Dawes |
| 12 | DF | ENG | Jason Pope |
| 13 | GK | ENG | Jakob Glover |

| No. | Pos. | Nation | Player |
|---|---|---|---|
| 14 | FW | ENG | Brad Ash |
| 16 | MF | ENG | Louie Derrick (on loan from Bristol City) |
| 18 | MF | ENG | Caden Voice (on loan from Cardiff City) |
| 20 | FW | ENG | Luke Skinner (on loan from Bristol City) |
| 21 | DF | ENG | Dan Martin |
| 22 | MF | ENG | George Robesten |
| 24 | DF | IRL | Sean Long |
| 26 | MF | ENG | Liam Sercombe |
| 27 | MF | ENG | Scot Bennett |
| 30 | MF | WAL | Will Jenkins-Davies |
| — | MF | ENG | James Watts-Barciela |
| — | MF | WAL | Josh Salmon |

=== Out on loan ===
Note: Flags indicate national team as defined under FIFA eligibility rules; some limited exceptions apply. Players may hold more than one non-FIFA nationality.

| No. | Pos. | Nation | Player |
|---|---|---|---|
| 15 | MF | ENG | Calum Hewlett (on loan at Bristol Manor Farm) |
| 17 | MF | ENG | Owen Johnson (dual-registered with Exmouth Town) |
| 19 | DF | ENG | Archie Taylor (on loan at Yate Town) |
| 23 | FW | ENG | Ricardo Thompson (on loan at Mangotsfield United) |
| — | DF | ITA | Faith Ikpeama (dual-registered with Thornbury Town) |
| — | MF | ENG | Jay Murray (on loan at Taunton Town) |
| — | MF | ENG | Josh Oliver (dual-registered with Thornbury Town) |
| — | FW | ENG | Leighton Green (dual-registered with Slimbridge) |

== Non-playing staff ==
=== Board of Directors ===
Updated 9 November 2025.

| Position | Name |
|---|---|
| President | Dennis Usher |
| Honorary Chairman | Paul Bliss |
| Chairman & Managing Director | Oli Bliss |
| Vice Chairman & Director of Commercial | Ed Bliss |
| Director of Academy | Simon Panes |
| Non-Executive Director | Lach Geddes |
| Director of Operations | Alex Crowther |

=== First team staff ===
Updated 9 November 2025.

| Position | Name |
|---|---|
| Manager | Scott Rogers |
| Interim Assistant Manager | Gary Warren |
| Technical Director | Adie Britton |
| Goalkeeping Coach | Steve Laker |
| Sports Therapist | Taylor Cornish |
| Massage Therapist | Amy Callow |
| Kit Manager | Liam Drury |
| Matchday Kit Manager | Gordon Mackay |
| Data Analyst | Richard Joyce |
| Groundsman | Sam Trego |

== Records ==
- Highest League Position: 6th in National League South 2025-26
- FA Cup best performance: Third round, 2025–26
- FA Trophy best performance: Fourth round, 1998–99, 2003–04, 2023–24
- Highest Attendance: 2,949 vs Doncaster Rovers – 2014–15 (F.A. Cup)

== Former players ==
1. Players that have played/managed at least 40 games in the football league or any foreign equivalent to this level (i.e. fully professional league).
2. Players with full international caps.
3. Players that have played/managed in another professional sport.
- (England) Craig Alcock
- (England) Danny Bailey
- (England) Michael Bell
- (England) Dom Bernard
- (England) Jon Beswetherick
- (England) Steve Book
- (England) Aaron Brown
- (England) Wayne Brown
- (England) Ray Cashley
- (England) Billy Clark
- (England) Jack Compton
- (England) Steve Cowe
- (England) Sonny Cox
- (France) Wilfried Domoraud
- (Germany) Kenan Dünnwald-Turan
- (England) Clayton Fortune
- (England) Jon French
- (England) Roger Gibbins
- (England) Jerry Gill
- (England) Charlie Comyn-Platt
- (England) Andy Gurney
- (England) Dayle Grubb
- (Wales) Lewis Haldane
- (England) Ian Hamilton
- (England) Ryan Harley
- (Wales) Callum Hart
- (England) Lewis Hogg
- (England) Marlon Jackson
- (Wales) Lee Jarman
- (England) Ian Juryeff
- (England) Harry Kite
- (England) Scott Laird
- (England) David Lee
- (England) Adam May
- (Wales) Kaid Mohamed
- (England) Barry McConnell
- (Northern Ireland) Mark McKeever
- (England) Paul McLoughlin
- (England) David Mehew
- (Wales) Rollin Menayese
- (England) Jennison Myrie-Williams
- (England) Ryan Northmore
- (England) Gary Owers
- (England) Scott Partridge
- (Guadeloupe) Ludovic Quistin
- (England) Joel Randall
- (England) Reuben Reid
- (Wales) Eliot Richards
- (England) Tommy Rudkin
- (England) Stuart Slater
- (England) David Stone
- (England) Ben Swallow
- (England) Jordan Tillson
- (England) Brian Tinnion
- (England) Peter Trego
- (England) Matt Villis
- (Wales) James Waite
- (England) Ollie Watkins
- (England) John Williams
- (England) Robbie Willmott

For those players that also played for the club but did not meet the criteria above:

== Former coaches ==
1. Managers/Coaches that have played/managed in the football league or any foreign equivalent to this level (i.e. fully professional league).
2. Managers/Coaches with full international caps.
- (England) Tommy Rudkin

== Honours ==
League

- Southern League (level 7)
  - Champions: 2022–23
- Southern League Western Division
  - Runners-up: 2002–03
- Western League
  - Champions: 1991–92
  - Runners-up: 1976–77
- Bristol & District League
  - Runners-up: 1922–23

Cup

- Somerset Premier Cup
  - Winners: 2010–11, 2011–12, 2017–18, 2018–19, 2024—25
  - Runners-up: 1990–91, 2016–17
- Clevedon and District Charity Cup
  - Winners: 1922–23
- Western Senior Cup
  - Winners: 1971–72, 1972–73, 1973–74, 1974–75, 1975–76, 1977–78
- Western League Challenge Cup
  - Winners: 1976–77
- Western Merit Cup
  - Winners: 1976–77, 1977–78
- Western League Subsidiary Cup
  - Runners-up: 1959–60
- Somerset Senior Cup
  - Winners: 1926–27
- Bristol Charity Cup
  - Winners: 1922–23
- Weston Charity Cup
  - Winners: 1910–11
- Clevedon Charity Cup
  - Runners-up: 1926–27
- Emirates FA Cup
  - Third round: 2025-26
