= 2008–09 Exeter City F.C. season =

Exeter City
2008–09 season
- Manager: Paul Tisdale
- Stadium: St James Park
- League Two: 2nd (promoted)
- FA Cup: First round
- League Cup: First round
- Football League Trophy: First round

The 2008–09 season saw Exeter City competed in Football League Two, alongside the FA Cup, Football League Cup and Football League Trophy.

== Competitions ==
=== Football League Two ===
Pos	Team	Pld	W	D	L	GF	GA	GD	Pts	Promotion, qualification or relegation
1	Brentford (C, P)	46	23	16	7	65	36	+29	85	Promotion to Football League One
2	Exeter City (P)	46	22	13	11	65	50	+15	79	Promotion to Football League One
3	Wycombe Wanderers (P)	46	20	18	8	54	33	+21	78	Promotion to Football League One
4	Bury	46	21	15	10	63	43	+20	78	Qualification for League Two play-offs
5	Gillingham (O, P)	46	21	12	13	58	55	+3	75	Qualification for League Two play-offs

Source: The Football League
Rules for classification: 1) points; 2) goal difference; 3) number of goals scored.
(C) Champions; (O) Play-off winners; (P) Promoted

==== Results ====
9 August 2008 1	Darlington	1–1	Exeter City	Darlington
	Purdie 40' (pen.)		Seaborne 60'	Stadium: The Darlington Arena; Attendance: 3,559

16 August 2008 2	Exeter City	0–1	Shrewsbury Town	Exeter
			Murray 71'	Stadium: St James Park; Attendance: 4,916

23 August 2008 3	Bournemouth	0–1	Exeter City	Bournemouth
			Harley 68'	Stadium: Fitness First Stadium; Attendance: 5,350

30 August 2008 4	Exeter City	0–1	Luton Town	Exeter
			Parkin 47'	Stadium: St James Park; Attendance: 5,328

6 September 2008 5	Exeter City	2–1	Accrington Stanley	Exeter
	Gill 45'; Watson 68'		Clarke 11'	Stadium: St James Park; Attendance: 3,930

13 September 2008 6	Bradford City	4–1	Exeter City	Bradford
	Thorne 54', 68'; Boulding 59', 72'		Gill 38'	Stadium: Coral Windows Stadium; Attendance: 12,683

20 September 2008 7	Exeter City	2–2	Notts County	Exeter
	Gill 22'; Taylor 87'		Johnson 58'; Canham 90'	Stadium: St James Park; Attendance: 4,341

27 September 2008 8	Macclesfield Town	1–4	Exeter City	Macclesfield
	Yeo 45'		Stansfield 1', 48'; Harley 35'; Gill 85'	Stadium: Moss Rose; Attendance: 1,854

4 October 2008 9	Exeter City	3–0	Gillingham	Exeter
	Logan 7'; Stansfield 39', 43'			Stadium: St James Park; Attendance: 4,819

11 October 2008 10	Bury	0–1	Exeter City	Bury
			Logan 7'	Stadium: Gigg Lane; Attendance: 3,220

18 October 2008 11	Exeter City	0–0	Grimsby Town	Exeter
				Stadium: St James Park; Attendance: 5,177

21 October 2008 12	Port Vale	1–3	Exeter City	Stoke on Trent
	Rodgers 86'		Stewart 17'; Sercombe 18'; Gill 65'	Stadium: Vale Park; Attendance: 5,493

25 October 2008 13	Barnet	0–1	Exeter City	London
			Gill 72'	Stadium: Underhill; Attendance: 2,887

28 October 2008 14	Exeter City	1–6	Chesterfield	Exeter
	Stansfield 49'		Winter 38'; Goodall 44'; Lester 63', 76'; Ward 78'; Currie 88'	Stadium: St James Park; Attendance: 5,093

1 November 2008 15	Exeter City	2–0	Chester City	Exeter
	Stansfield 22'; Taylor 88'			Stadium: St James Park; Attendance: 4,448

15 November 2008 16	Aldershot Town	1–0	Exeter City	Aldershot
	Grant 53'			Stadium: EBB Stadium; Attendance: 3,784

22 November 2008 17	Morecambe	1–1	Exeter City	Morecambe
	Howe 22'		Panther 85'; Cozic (yellow card) 48' (yellow-red card)	Stadium: Christie Park; Attendance: 2,003

25 November 2008 18	Exeter City	1–1	Rotherham United	Exeter
	Watson 41'		Reid 66' (pen.)	Stadium: St James Park; Attendance: 3,402

6 December 2008 19	Exeter City	2–1	Lincoln City	Exeter
	McAllister 75'; Moxey 90'		John-Lewis 51'; N'Guessan (red card) 88'	Stadium: St James Park; Attendance: 3,916

20 December 2008 20	Exeter City	4–1	Rochdale	Exeter
	Basham 16', 31' (pen.); McAllister 84', 87'		Keltie 90' (pen.); Wiseman (red card) 31'	Stadium: St James Park; Attendance: 4,326

26 December 2008 21	Wycombe Wanderers	1–1	Exeter City	High Wycombe
	Harrold 6' (pen.)		Panther 57'	Stadium: Adams Park; Attendance: 6,094

28 December 2008 22	Exeter City	0–2	Brentford	Exeter
			MacDonald 75' (pen.); Wood 79'	Stadium: St James Park; Attendance: 6,791

10 January 2009 23	Notts County	2–1	Exeter City	Nottingham
	Facey 32'; Strachan 39'		Stewart 26' (pen.)	Stadium: Meadow Lane; Attendance: 3,832

17 January 2009 24	Exeter City	0–0	Bury	Exeter
				Stadium: St James Park; Attendance: 4,158

21 January 2009 25	Dagenham & Redbridge	1–2	Exeter City	London
	Strevens 45'		McAllister 27', 47'	Stadium: Victoria Road; Attendance: 2,053

24 January 2009 26	Gillingham	1–0	Exeter City	Gillingham
	Miller 79'			Stadium: Priestfield; Attendance: 5,638

28 January 2009 27	Chesterfield	2–1	Exeter City	Chesterfield
	Lester 68', 80'		Moxey 17'	Stadium: Saltergate; Attendance: 2,894

31 January 2009 28	Exeter City	2–1	Barnet	Exeter
	Saunders 20'; Gill 73'		Furlong 45'	Stadium: St James Park; Attendance: 4,145

7 February 2009 29	Grimsby Town	2–2	Exeter City	Grimsby
	Jarman 45', 54'		Stewart 8'; Harley 79'	Stadium: Blundell Park; Attendance: 3,324

10 February 2009 30	Exeter City	4–0	Macclesfield Town	Exeter
	Stansfield 16'; Logan 44'; Saunders 73'; McAllister 75'			Stadium: St James Park; Attendance: 2,839

14 February 2009 31	Exeter City	3–2	Aldershot Town	Exeter
	Stewart 30'; Harding 78' (o.g.); Saunders 80'		Robinson 55'; Harding 60'	Stadium: St James Park; Attendance: 4,840

21 February 2009 32	Chester City	0–0	Exeter City	Chester
				Stadium: Deva Stadium; Attendance: 1,640

28 February 2009 33	Exeter City	2–0	Darlington	Exeter
	Gill 72' (pen.); McAllister 83'		White (red card) 88'	Stadium: St James Park; Attendance: 4,851

3 March 2009 34	Shrewsbury Town	1–1	Exeter City	Shrewsbury
	Holt 51' (pen.)		Stewart 83'	Stadium: Prostar Stadium; Attendance: 4,679

7 March 2009 35	Luton Town	1–2	Exeter City	Luton
	Craddock 39'		Stansfield 4'; Sercombe 29'	Stadium: Kenilworth Road; Attendance: 6,460

10 March 2009 36	Exeter City	1–3	Bournemouth	Exeter
	Stansfield 13'		Hollands 56'; Pitman 59', 87'	Stadium: St James Park; Attendance: 4,946

14 March 2009 37	Exeter City	1–0	Bradford City	Exeter
	Moxey 20'			Stadium: St James Park; Attendance: 5,253

21 March 2009 38	Accrington Stanley	2–1	Exeter City	Accrington
	Miles 34'; Lindfield 64'		Stansfield 5'	Stadium: Crown Ground; Attendance: 1,169

28 March 2009 39	Rochdale	2–2	Exeter City	Rochdale
	Thorpe 27'; Le Fondre 83'		Stewart 55', 84' (pen.)	Stadium: Spotland; Attendance: 3,364

31 March 2009 40	Exeter City	1–0	Port Vale	Exeter
	Prosser 29' (o.g.)			Stadium: St James Park; Attendance: 4,235

4 April 2009 41	Exeter City	2–1	Dagenham & Redbridge	Exeter
	Fleetwood 16', 49'		Strevens 36'	Stadium: St James Park; Attendance: 5,123

11 April 2009 42	Brentford	1–1	Exeter City	London
	Clarke 90'		Fleetwood 38'	Stadium: Griffin Park; Attendance: 8,234

13 April 2009 43	Exeter City	1–0	Wycombe Wanderers	Exeter
	Gill 64'			Stadium: St James Park; Attendance: 8,183

18 April 2009 44	Lincoln City	0–1	Exeter City	Lincoln
			Burch 88' (o.g.)	Stadium: Sincil Bank; Attendance: 3,934

25 April 2009 45	Exeter City	2–2	Morecambe	Exeter
	Moxey 49'; Harley 53'		Drummond 9', 79'	Stadium: St James Park; Attendance: 8,544

2 May 2009 46	Rotherham United	0–1	Exeter City	Sheffield
			Logan 71'	Stadium: Don Valley Stadium; Attendance: 6,184

=== FA Cup ===
8 November 2008 Round 1	Curzon Ashton	3–2	Exeter City	Ashton under Lyne
	Worsley 26'; Ogoo 56'; Norton 79'		Basham 84'; Moxey 90'; Gill (red card) 89'	Stadium: Tameside Stadium; Attendance: 1,259

=== Football League Cup ===
12 August 2008 Round 1	Exeter City	1–3	Southampton	Exeter
	Moxey 85'		Holmes 29'; McGoldrick 77', 90' (pen.)	Stadium: St James Park; Attendance: 6,471

=== Football League Trophy ===
2 September 2008 Southern Section Round 1	Exeter City	1–2	Shrewsbury Town	Exeter
	Harley 22'		McIntyre 9'; Davies 90'	Stadium: St James Park; Attendance: 1,530

== Season squad ==
Note: Flags indicate national team as defined under FIFA eligibility rules; some limited exceptions apply. Players may hold more than one non-FIFA nationality.

No.	Pos.	Nation	Player
1	GK	WAL	Andy Marriott
2	DF	ENG	Steve Tully
3	DF	IRL	Fred Murray
4	MF	ENG	Matthew Gill
5	DF	ENG	Daniel Seaborne
6	DF	ENG	Matt Taylor
7	MF	ENG	Ryan Harley
8	MF	SCO	Manny Panther
9	FW	ENG	Adam Stansfield
10	FW	SCO	Craig McAllister
11	DF	ENG	Jack Obersteller
12	FW	ENG	Steve Basham
14	MF	FRA	Bertrand Cozic
15	MF	WAL	Rob Edwards
16	FW	ENG	Marcus Stewart
17	MF	ENG	Paul Tisdale
18	MF	ENG	Neil Saunders
19	FW	ENG	Ben Watson
20	FW	ENG	Richard Logan

No.	Pos.	Nation	Player
21	DF	ENG	Dean Moxey
22	MF	ENG	Liam Sercombe
23	DF	ENG	Lewis Tasker
24	DF	ENG	Ronnie Bull
25	MF	ENG	Chris Shephard
26	DF	ENG	Scot Bennett
27	GK	ENG	Paul Jones
28	GK	ENG	Nick Jordan
29	DF	ENG	Troy Archibald-Henville (on loan from Tottenham Hotspur)
30	MF	ENG	Alex Russell (on loan from Cheltenham Town)
31	MF	ENG	Ben Osman
32	FW	ENG	Toby Osman
33	FW	ENG	Kyle Bassett
34	MF	ENG	Aaron Dawson
35	DF	ENG	Aaron Doble
36	DF	ENG	Jack Furzer
37	MF	ENG	Noah Keats
38	MF	ENG	Dan Western
39	DF	ENG	Jack Pattison
40	FW	WAL	Stuart Fleetwood (on loan from Charlton Athletic)

=== Players who left during the season ===
Note: Flags indicate national team as defined under FIFA eligibility rules; some limited exceptions apply. Players may hold more than one non-FIFA nationality.

No.	Pos.	Nation	Player
3	DF	ENG	George Friend
23	MF	ENG	Neil Martin
