= 2009–10 Exeter City F.C. season =

Exeter City
2009–10 season
- Manager: Paul Tisdale
- League One: 18th
- FA Cup: 2nd round
- League Cup: 1st round
- Top goalscorer: Ryan Harley (10)
Home colours

The 2009–10 Football League One was Exeter City F.C.'s first season back in the third tier of English football since 1994. This article shows statistics of the club's players in the season, and also lists all matches that the club has played during the season.

== Match results ==
=== Legend ===
Win	Draw	Loss

=== Football League One ===
Game	Date	Opponent	Venue	Result	Attendance	Goalscorers	Match report
1	8 August 2009	Leeds United	Elland Road	1–2	27,681	Russell 73'	Report
2	15 August 2009	Norwich City	St James Park	1–1	6,357	Logan 60'	Report
3	18 August 2009	Yeovil Town	St James Park	1–1	6,650	Stam 14' (o.g.)	Report
4	22 August 2009	Carlisle United	Brunton Park	1–0	5,156	Stewart (pen) 73'	Report
5	29 August 2009	Milton Keynes Dons	St James Park	1–2	5,333	Corr 51'	Report
6	5 September 2009	Gillingham	Priestfield Stadium	0–3	5,107		Report
7	12 September 2009	Leyton Orient	Brisbane Road	1–1	4,703	Noone 79'	Report
8	19 September 2009	Tranmere Rovers	St James Park	2–1	4,901	Stansfield 25', 54'	Report
9	26 September 2009	Charlton Athletic	The Valley	2–1	16,867	Cozic 90+2'	Report
10	29 September 2009	Swindon Town	St James Park	1–1	5,337	Logan 87'	Report
11	3 October 2009	Hartlepool United	St James Park	3–1	4,706	Harley 34', Fleetwood 62', Dunne 90'	Report
12	10 October 2009	Huddersfield Town	Galpharm Stadium	0–4	13,438		Report
13	17 October 2009	Walsall	The Banks' Stadium	0–3	4,063		Report
14	24 October 2009	Wycombe Wanderers	St James Park	1–1	5,227	Corr 90+3'	Report
15	31 October 2009	Brentford	St James Park	3–0	5,355	Cozic 7', Tully 45', Noone 69'	Report
16	14 November 2009	Colchester United	Community Stadium	2–2	5,208	Fleetwood 6', Harley 45+1'	Report
17	21 November 2009	Stockport County	Edgeley Park	3–1	4,101	Harley 39', Stansfield 90+1', Logan 90+4'	Report
18	24 November 2009	Millwall	St James Park	1–1	5,732	Stansfield 88'	Report
19	1 December 2009	Bristol Rovers	Memorial Stadium	0–1	7,313		Report
20	5 December 2009	Brighton & Hove Albion	St James Park	0–1	5,456		Report
21	12 December 2009	Oldham Athletic	Boundary Park	0–2	6,230		Report
22	19 December 2009	Southend United	St James Park	1–0	4,839	Stansfield 17'	Report
23	26 December 2009	Southampton	St Mary's Stadium	1–3	30,890	Taylor 68'	Report
24	28 December 2009	Gillingham	St James Park	1–1	5,761	Duffy 68'	Report
25	9 January 2010	Norwich City	Carrow Road	1–3	24,955	Stewart 81'	Report
26	16 January 2010	Leeds United	St James Park	2–0	8,549	Harley 4', 83'	Report
27	23 January 2010	Yeovil Town	Huish Park	1–2	6,282	Stansfield 22'	Report
28	26 January 2010	Carlisle United	St James Park	2–3	4,106	Stansfield 79', Harley 90'	Report
29	30 January 2010	Milton Keynes Dons	Stadium:mk	1–1	8,740	Corr 90+2'	Report
30	6 February 2010	Southampton	St James Park	1–1	7,654	Taylor 49'	Report
31	13 February 2010	Millwall	The Den	0–1	9,104		Report
32	20 February 2010	Stockport County	St James Park	0–1	4,990		Report
33	27 February 2010	Brighton & Hove Albion	Withdean Stadium	0–2	6,952		Report
34	6 March 2010	Oldham Athletic	St James Park	1–1	4,997	Harley 60' (pen)	Report
35	13 March 2010	Southend United	Roots Hall	0–0	6,761		Report
36	17 March 2010	Bristol Rovers	St James Park	1–0	5,269	Dunne 90'	Report
37	20 March 2010	Wycombe Wanderers	Adams Park	2–2	5,054	Sercombe 66', Logan 89'	Report
38	27 March 2010	Walsall	St James Park	2–1	5,887	Taylor 4', Harley 58' (pen)	Report
39	2 April 2010	Colchester United	St James Park	2–0	6,297	Fleetwood 33', Harley 90' (pen)	Report
40	5 April 2010	Brentford	Griffin Park	0–0	6,017		Report
41	10 April 2010	Leyton Orient	St James Park	0–0	5,522		Report
42	12 April 2010	Swindon Town	County Ground	1–1	8,753	Dunne 41'	Report
43	17 April 2010	Tranmere Rovers	Prenton Park	1–3	5,466	Fleetwood 85'	Report
44	24 April 2010	Charlton Athletic	St James Park	1–1	6,835	Friend 59'	Report
45	1 May 2010	Hartlepool United	Victoria Park	1–1	3,983	Taylor 37'	Report
46	8 May 2010	Huddersfield Town	St James Park	2–1	8,383	Taylor 22', Harley 82'	Report

=== League Cup ===
Round	Date	Opponent	Venue	Result	Attendance	Goalscorers	Match report
1	11 August 2009	Queens Park Rangers	St James Park	0–5	4,614		Report

=== FA Cup ===
Round	Date	Opponent	Venue	Result	Attendance	Goalscorers	Match report
R1	7 November 2009	Nuneaton Town	Liberty Way	4–0	2,452	Taylor 4', 44', Corr 31', Hadland 38' (o.g.),	Report
R2	28 November 2009	Milton Keynes Dons	Stadium:mk	3–4	4,867	Corr 50', 54', Stansfield 67'	Report

=== Football League Trophy ===
Round	Date	Opponent	Venue	Result	Attendance	Goalscorers	Match report
1	6 October 2009	Swindon Town	St James Park	1 – 1 (3–4 pens)	2,006	Fleetwood 90+2'	Report

== Squad statistics ==
Appearances for competitive matches only

No.	Pos.	Name	League		FA Cup		League Cup		Total		Discipline	
No.	Pos.	Name	Apps	Goals	Apps	Goals	Apps	Goals	Apps	Goals	Yellow card	Red card
1	GK	(Wales) Andy Marriott	13	0	2	0	0	0	15	0	0	0
2	DF	(England) Steve Tully	36 (2)	1	1	0	0 (1)	0	37 (3)	1	4	1
3	DF	(Wales) Richard Duffy	40 (1)	1	1	0	1	0	42 (1)	1	12	1
4	MF	(England) Alex Russell	27 (2)	1	2	0	1	0	29 (2)	1	2	0
5	DF	(England) Danny Seaborne	17 (1)	0	2	0	1	0	20 (1)	0	2	0
6	DF	(England) Matt Taylor	45	5	2	2	1	0	48	7	4	0
7	MF	(England) Ryan Harley	44 (1)	10	2	0	1	0	46 (1)	10	3	0
9	MF	(England) Adam Stansfield	20 (8)	5	1 (1)	1	0	0	21 (9)	7	2	0
10	FW	(Scotland) Craig McAllister	0 (4)	0	0	0	1	0	1 (4)	0	0	0
11	DF	(England) Scott Golbourne	30 (3)	0	2	0	1	0	33 (3)	0	4	1
12	FW	(Republic of Ireland) Barry Corr	15 (17)	3	2	3	0	0	17 (17)	6	3	3
14	MF	(France) Bertie Cozic	21 (8)	2	2	0	1	0	24 (8)	2	3	0
15	DF	(Wales) Rob Edwards	17 (4)	0	0	0	0	0	17 (4)	0	3	0
16	FW	(England) Marcus Stewart	34 (5)	2	1	0	1	0	36 (5)	2	3	1
18	MF	(England) Neil Saunders	2 (4)	0	0	0	0	0	2 (4)	0	0	0
19	FW	(England) Ben Watson	0 (1)	0	0	0	0	0	0 (1)	0	0	0
20	FW	(England) Richard Logan	3 (31)	4	0	0	0 (1)	0	3 (31)	4	4	0
21	MF	(England) James Dunne	18 (5)	3	1 (1)	0	0	0	19 (6)	3	5	1
22	MF	(England) Liam Sercombe	25 (3)	1	1	0	1	0	27 (3)	1	0	0
23	DF	(England) Lewis Tasker	18 (3)	1	1	0	1	0	20 (3)	1	1	0
26	DF	(England) Scot Bennett	0	0	0	0	0	0	0	0	0	0
27	GK	(England) Paul Jones	26	0	0	0	1	0	27	0	0	0
28	MF	(England) Joe Burnell	4 (4)	0	0	0	0	0	4 (4)	0	1	0
29	DF	(England) Troy Archibald-Henville	13 (2)	0	0 (1)	0	0	0	13 (3)	0	2	1
31	FW	(England) James Norwood	2 (1)	0	0	0	0 (1)	0	2 (2)	0	0	0
45	FW	(Wales) Stuart Fleetwood	16 (11)	4	2	0	0	0	18 (11)	4	2	0
46	GK	(Sweden) Oscar Jansson	7	0	0	0	0	0	7	0	0	0
47	FW	(England) Craig Noone	7	2	0	0	0	0	7	2	0	0
48	DF	(England) George Friend	13	1	0	0	0	0	13	1	0	0
50	FW	(Canada) Marcus Haber	3 (2)	0	0	0	0	0	3 (2)	0	0	0
51	FW	(England) Ryan Taylor	3 (4)	0	0	0	0	0	3 (4)	0	1	0

== Transfers ==
=== In ===
Date	Nation	Position	Name	Club from	Free
2 July 2009	(Republic of Ireland)	FW	Barry Corr	Swindon Town	Free
2 July 2009	(England)	DF	Scott Golbourne	Reading	Free
10 July 2009	(England)	MF	Joe Burnell	Oxford United	Free
23 July 2009	(Wales)	DF	Richard Duffy	Millwall	Free
23 July 2009	(England)	MF	James Dunne	Arsenal	Free
24 July 2009	(England)	FW	James Norwood	Eastbourne Town	Free
1 February 2010	(England)	DF	Troy Archibald-Henville	Tottenham Hotspur	Undisclosed

=== Out ===
Date	Nation	Position	Name	Club to	Free
9 June 2009	(England)	MF	Matthew Gill	Norwich City	Free
26 June 2009	(England)	DF	Dean Moxey	Derby County	Undisclosed
2 August 2009	(England)	FW	Steve Basham	Luton Town	Free
5 August 2000	(Republic of Ireland)	DF	Fred Murray	Grays Athletic	Free
5 August 2009	(England)	DF	Ronnie Bull	Grays Athletic	Free
28 August 2009	(England)	DF	Jack Obersteller	Grays Athletic	Free

=== Loan In ===
Date	Nation	Position	Name	Club from	Length
24 July 2009	(England)	DF	Troy Archibald-Henville	Tottenham Hotspur	6 months
1 September 2009	(Wales)	FW	Stuart Fleetwood	Charlton Athletic	Full season
1 September 2009	(Sweden)	GK	Oscar Jansson	Tottenham Hotspur	1 month
11 September 2009	(England)	FW	Craig Noone	Plymouth Argyle	3 months (recalled 1 November)
18 February 2010	(Canada)	FW	Marcus Haber	West Bromwich Albion	1 month
4 March 2010	(England)	DF	George Friend	Wolverhampton Wanderers	Until end of season

=== Loan Out ===
Date	Nation	Position	Name	Club to	Length
18 August 2009	(Scotland)	MF	Manny Panther	Morecambe	Full season
21 November 2009	(England)	FW	James Norwood	Sutton United	1 month
	(England)	MF	Chris Shephard	Salisbury City	

== See also ==
- 2009–10 in English football
- Exeter City F.C.
