= Craig McAllister =

Scottish association football player

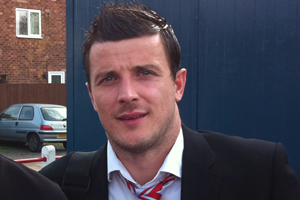
- McAllister in 2011

Personal information
- Full name: Craig McAllister
- Date of birth: 28 June 1980 (age 46)
- Place of birth: Glasgow, Scotland
- Height: 6 ft 1 in (1.85 m)
- Position: Striker

Senior career*
Years	Team	Apps	(Gls)
2001–2002	Eastleigh		
2002–2004	Basingstoke Town	97	(54)
2004–2005	Stevenage Borough	6	(0)
2004–2005	→ Gravesend & Northfleet (loan)	5	(2)
2005	→ Eastleigh (loan)	15	(6)
2005–2007	Woking	83	(23)
2007–2008	Grays Athletic	9	(1)
2007–2008	→ Rushden & Diamonds (loan)	9	(1)
2008	Oxford United	17	(2)
2008–2010	Exeter City	34	(7)
2009	→ Barnet (loan)	5	(0)
2010	→ Rotherham United (loan)	8	(0)
2010–2011	Crawley Town	41	(12)
2011–2012	Newport County	25	(0)
2012	→ Luton Town (loan)	14	(1)
2012–2015	Eastleigh	116	(40)
2015–2017	Sutton United	34	(8)
2016	→ Eastbourne Borough (loan)	5	(1)
2017–2018	Eastleigh	39	(3)
2018	Gosport Borough	10	(4)
2018	Blackfield & Langley	12	(7)
2018–2019	Gosport Borough		
2019–2020	Alresford Town	24	(8)
2020–2021	Lymington Town	7	(0)
2021–2022	Baffins Milton Rovers	9	(5)
2022	Lymington Town	0	(0)
2022–2023	Blackfield & Langley	5	(3)
2023	Hythe & Dibden	1	(1)
2023–2024	Brockenhurst	5	(0)

Managerial career
- 2018–2019: Gosport Borough (player-manager)
- * Club domestic league appearances and goals as of 13:29, 19 December 2025 (UTC)

Craig McAllister (born 28 June 1980) is a Scottish former professional footballer.

McAllister started his career with Eastleigh as a youth player. He moved to Basingstoke Town towards the end of 2001–02, making his debut in March 2002. McAllister spent three seasons there, making 113 appearances, scoring 66 goals before moving up the national league system to Conference National club Stevenage Borough where he made 10 appearances, having loan spells at Gravesend & Northfleet and Eastleigh in 2004–05. He joined Woking in 2005, spending two full seasons there, and making over 100 appearances. He had a short spell with Grays Athletic, being sent out on loan to Rushden & Diamonds and then another short spell at Oxford United, all during 2007–08. After leaving Oxford in 2008, he took a step up to the Football League for the first time in his career, signing for Exeter City. He went on to score seven goals in his first season, but was loaned out to Barnet and Rotherham United in his second and was eventually released by the club in May 2010. McAllister then dropped back down to non-League football, joining Crawley Town where he played at Old Trafford; his team was defeated 1–0 by Manchester United in their FA Cup fifth round tie. He rejected a new contract from Crawley at the end of the 2010–11, subsequently joining Newport County.

McAllister won his first major honour in 2011, helping Crawley Town win the Conference Premier for the first time in their history. He has also won the Conference South title with Eastleigh in 2014 and the National League South title with Sutton United in 2016.

== Career ==
=== Non-League ===
Born in Glasgow, McAllister began his career in non-League football with Eastleigh in 2001. He signed for Isthmian League Premier Division club Basingstoke Town in March 2002 following a successful trial and scored on his debut in a 1–1 draw at home to Hampton & Richmond Borough. McAllister finished 2001–02 with three goals from 10 appearances. He scored on his first appearance of 2002–03 against Aylesbury United on the opening day of the season, which finished as a 2–2 draw. McAllister scored a hat-trick in a 3–1 win at home to Bishop's Stortford on 9 November 2002, and this was followed up with a hat-trick in the following match, a 3–0 win away to Braintree Town. He finished 2002–03 with 35 goals from 48 appearances. McAllister's success continued into 2003–04, during which he scored another 28 goals in 55 appearances. This success earned him a trial with Queens Park Rangers in the First Division, just one level below the Premier League, and later went on trial with Second Division club Luton Town.

After scoring 66 times in 113 appearances for Basingstoke Town, McAllister moved to the Conference National outfit Stevenage Borough on a bosman transfer in May 2004. He debuted after being introduced as a 33rd-minute substitute in a 1–0 victory at home to Crawley Town on 16 October 2004. McAllister struggled to force his way into the first-team, and was loaned to fellow Conference National club Gravesend & Northfleet on 14 December, debuting four days later in a 1–0 defeat away to Hereford United. He went on to score his first goal for Gravesend & Northfleet after just two minutes in a 1–1 draw away to Crawley Town on 26 December, and this was followed up with a goal in the following match, a 2–2 draw at home to Accrington Stanley. McAllister completed the loan spell with two goals from five appearances, before rejoining his former club Eastleigh on loan until the end of 2004–05.

Before the start of 2005–06, McAllister signed for Conference National club Woking on a permanent deal. He debuted on the opening day of the season, starting in a 2–1 defeat away to Kidderminster Harriers. McAllister finished his debut season with 13 goals, eight of which came in the league. He scored his first brace for Woking on 1 September 2006 in a 3–2 win away to Forest Green Rovers. McAllister signed a two-year contract with Grays Athletic in May 2007. After making his debut on the opening day of 2007–08 in a 0–0 draw away to Torquay United, McAllister made a further eight appearances and scored one goal in a 2–1 win away to Droylsden on 1 September 2007, before he was loaned to league rivals Rushden & Diamonds on 11 October. He debuted a day later in a 2–1 defeat at home to Forest Green Rovers before being recalled by Grays on 12 November, having scored once in five appearances. McAllister returned to Rushden on loan on 21 November until January 2008 and made a further nine appearances. Upon his return to Grays, McAllister signed for fellow Conference Premier club Oxford United on 4 January 2008 on a contract until the end of the 2007–08. He scored on his debut a day later in a 4–0 win at home to Altrincham, but suffered a hamstring injury after 28 minutes in the following match, a 1–0 defeat at home to Weymouth. McAllister returned to the team for a 1–0 victory at home to Droylsden on 16 February, and finished the season with 17 appearances and two goals for Oxford.

=== Exeter City ===
McAllister made the step up to the Football League by signing for newly promoted League Two club Exeter City in the summer of 2008. He debuted in the League Cup first round against Southampton on 12 August 2008, which finished as a 3–1 defeat. His first goal came with the equaliser against Lincoln City on 6 December, which finished as a 2–1 victory, and this was followed up with two goals in a 4–1 win at home to Rochdale on 20 December. McAllister scored twice against Dagenham & Redbridge on 20 January 2009 to give Exeter a 2–1 victory. He finished his first season at Exeter with seven goals from 32 appearances, as they finished second in League Two and therefore won promotion into League One. After only making five appearances for Exeter in 2009–10, McAllister joined Barnet on loan in November 2009. He debuted in a 1–1 draw at home to AFC Bournemouth on 1 December 2009 and completed the loan spell with five appearances. McAllister returned to Exeter in January 2010, but was unable to force his way into the first-team, and signed a one-month emergency loan deal with Rotherham United on 11 March 2010. He made his debut for Rotherham two days later in their 1–0 win away to Dagenham & Redbridge and completed the loan spell with eight appearances. Upon his return to Exeter, McAllister was one of nine players released by the club at the end of the season.

=== Return to non-League ===
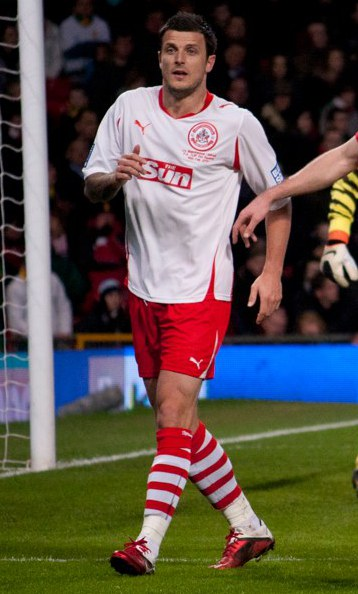
McAllister playing for Crawley Town in 2011

Following his release from Exeter City, McAllister moved back to non-League, signing for Conference Premier outfit Crawley Town on a one-year contract in June 2010. He debuted on the opening day of 2010–11 in a 1–0 defeat at home to Grimsby Town and scored his first goal for Crawley ten days later with the second goal in a 2–1 win over newly promoted Bath City. McAllister went on to score two goals in the following match, a 3–0 victory away to Hayes & Yeading United. He started in Crawley's FA Cup fifth-round tie against Manchester United at Old Trafford on 19 February 2011, which finished as a 1–0 defeat. At the end of the season, after Crawley won the Conference Premier title and therefore promotion into the Football League, McAllister was released after he rejected a new deal.

McAllister signed for Newport County in May 2011, deciding to stay in non-League football. He signed for Newport after their manager, Anthony Hudson, had earlier stated "We are on the verge of two massive additions to the squad, who will take the club in the direction that we want to go." He debuted on the opening day of 2011–12 in a 3–2 defeat away to Kettering Town. McAllister was transfer listed by manager Justin Edinburgh in January 2012 after failing to find the net in 25 league appearances for Newport. He was loaned to Conference Premier rivals Luton Town on 18 January until the end of 2011–12. McAllister debuted on 25 January in a 0–0 draw at home to Mansfield Town and scored his first goal for Luton with the third goal in a 3–0 victory at home to Ebbsfleet United on 17 April. Luton finished fifth in the Conference Premier, and McAllister was introduced as a substitute in both legs of the play-off semi-final against Wrexham, which Luton won 3–2 on aggregate. He was introduced as a substitute again in the 2012 Conference Premier play-off final at Wembley Stadium, in which Luton lost 2–1 to York City, and completed the loan spell with 17 appearances and one goal.

McAllister rejoined Conference South club Eastleigh on a two-year contract on 26 June 2012. His first appearance after his return came on the opening day of 2012–13 in a 3–0 defeat away to Boreham Wood and scored his first goal three days later in a 1–1 draw at home to former club Basingstoke Town. McAllister went on to score in Eastleigh's following three matches and extended his goalscoring run to four consecutive matches. He rediscovered his goalscoring form during the final month of the league season, scoring nine goals in eight appearances, during which he netted two successive hat-tricks and finished the season with 17 goals from 38 league appearances. Eastleigh finished fourth in the Conference South, and McAllister played in both legs of the play-off semi-final defeat to Dover Athletic, losing 4–2 in a penalty shoot-out, after the tie finished 3–3 on aggregate. McAllister made 41 appearances and scored 15 goals in 2013–14, as Eastleigh won the Conference South title and therefore promotion into the Conference Premier. He made 48 appearances and scored 11 goals during Eastleigh's first season in the Conference Premier, including both legs of the play-off semi-final defeat to Grimsby Town, losing 5–1 on aggregate, after they finished fourth in the table. McAllister was released by Eastleigh after the end of the season.

McAllister signed for National League South club Sutton United prior to the start of 2015–16. He debuted on the opening day of the season in a 2–0 defeat at home to Maidstone United. McAllister scored his first goal for Sutton on 5 September 2015 in a 2–2 draw at home to Concord Rangers, and this was followed up with a goal in the following match, a 1–0 victory at home to Gosport Borough. He finished the season with eight goals from 30 appearances, as Sutton won the National League South title and therefore promotion into the National League, but missed the latter part of the season due to injury. McAllister was loaned to National League South club Eastbourne Borough in September 2016 on a one-month loan. He debuted in a 4–0 victory at home to Oxford City on 3 September 2016 and completed the loan spell with one goal from five appearances. McAllister made his first appearance of 2016–17 for Sutton on 4 October in a 3–1 defeat away to Dover Athletic and scored his first goal in the following match, a 4–1 victory at home to former club Woking, in which he scored a header to make the score 4–0. He made 16 appearances and scored two goals for Sutton in 2016–17.

McAllister re-signed for Eastleigh on 17 February 2017 on a contract until the end of 2016–17. He made his fourth debut a day later in a 2–0 defeat at home to Tranmere Rovers.

On 11 January 2018, McAllister signed for Southern League Premier Division club Gosport Borough as player-coach, after leaving Eastleigh by mutual consent. After scoring four goals from 10 appearances for Gosport, McAllister signed for Blackfield & Langley of the Wessex League Premier Division, scoring twice on his debut on 10 March in a 3–0 home win over AFC Portchester. He finished the season playing for both Blackfield & Langley and Gosport Borough, making a further three appearances, scoring once for Gosport, to help them avoid relegation from the Southern League Premier Division. McAllister made 13 appearances and scored seven goals for Blackfield & Langley, as the club won the Wessex League Premier Division title.

On 26 June 2018, McAllister was appointed player-manager of Gosport Borough.

He signed for Alresford Town for the 2019–20 campaign of the Wessex League Premier Division. He made 24 league appearances for the club, scoring eight goals. During 2020 he signed for Lymington Town. In December 2021 he moved to Baffins Milton Rovers. He returned to Lymington in May 2022, later moving back to Blackfield & Langley. He spent the 2023-24 season at Hythe & Dibden and Brockenhurst.

== Style of play ==
McAllister plays as a striker, he is "an explosive front man", and is described as a "target man" because of his height. His time at Basingstoke Town was described as "prolific" due to the number of goals he scored. While at Exeter City, manager Paul Tisdale described him as "excellent", and said that McAllister and fellow Exeter City striker Richard Logan had a good partnership together after McAllister scored a hat-trick for the reserve team. After signing for Luton Town on loan in January 2012, manager Gary Brabin described McAllister as "adaptable in any role...he works hard, he's strong and he chips in with his fair share of goals."

== Personal life ==
After his move to Oxford United in January 2008, he stated that the reason for the move was so that he could be closer to his family home in Southampton. On his arrival at Exeter City in July 2008, he moved into a house with fellow Exeter forward, Ben Watson. McAllister stated that it would make a huge difference living near the training ground, instead of travelling long distances to get to training and matches. They parted company on 1 May 2019. McAllister has two children, born in October 2011 and November 2013.

== Career statistics ==
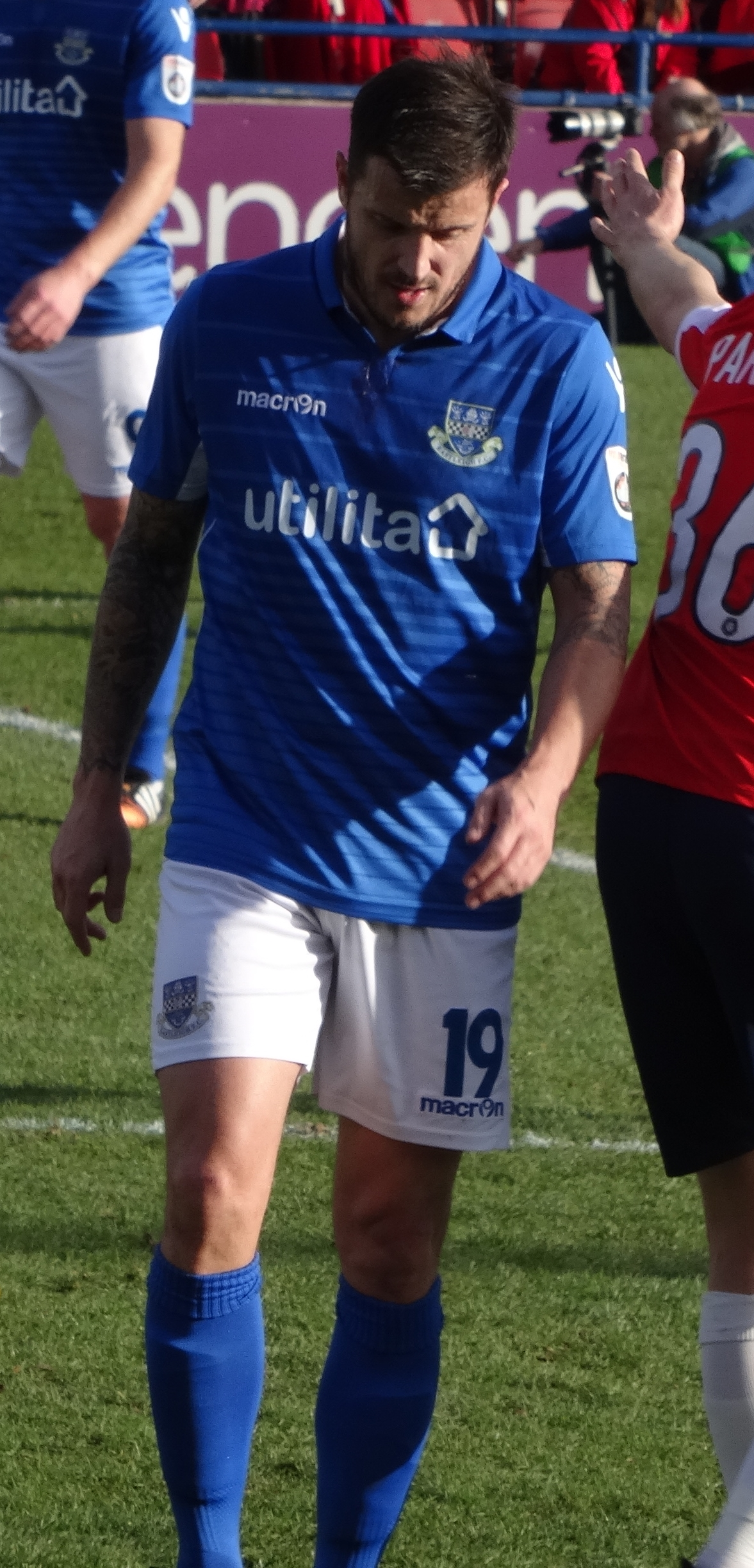
McAllister playing for Eastleigh in 2017

As of end of 2017–18 season

Appearances and goals by club, season and competition
Club	Season	League			FA Cup		League Cup		Other		Total	
Club	Season	Division	Apps	Goals	Apps	Goals	Apps	Goals	Apps	Goals	Apps	Goals
Basingstoke Town	2001–02	Isthmian League Premier Division	10	3	0	0	—		0	0	10	3
Basingstoke Town	2002–03	Isthmian League Premier Division	42	31	1	0	—		5 (Note: Two appearances and two goals in Hampshire Senior Cup, two appearances and one goal in FA Trophy, one appearance and one goal in Isthmian League Cup)	4	48	35
Basingstoke Town	2003–04	Isthmian League Premier Division	45	20	1	1	—		9 (Note: Three appearances and four goals in Hampshire Senior Cup, two appearances in Isthmian League Cup, three appearances and two goals in FA Trophy, one appearance and one goal in Isthmian League play-offs)	7	55	28
Basingstoke Town	Total		97	54	2	1	—		14	11	113	66
Stevenage Borough	2004–05	Conference National	6	0	3	1	—		1 (Note: Appearance(s) in FA Trophy)	0	10	1
Gravesend & Northfleet (loan)	2004–05	Conference National	5	2	—		—		—		5	2
Eastleigh (loan)	2004–05	Isthmian League Premier Division	15	6	—		—		—		15	6
Woking	2005–06	Conference National	39	8	4	1	—		11	4	54	13
Woking	2006–07	Conference National	44	15	2	1	—		1	1	47	17
Woking	Total		83	23	6	2	—		12	5	101	30
Grays Athletic	2007–08	Conference Premier	9	1	—		—		—		9	1
Rushden & Diamonds (loan)	2007–08	Conference Premier	9	1	3	0	—		2 (Note: One appearance in FA Trophy, one in Conference League Cup)	0	14	1
Oxford United	2007–08	Conference Premier	17	2	—		—		—		17	2
Exeter City	2008–09	League Two	30	7	0	0	1	0	1 (Note: Appearance in Football League Trophy)	0	32	7
Exeter City	2009–10	League One	4	0	0	0	1	0	0	0	5	0
Exeter City	Total		34	7	0	0	2	0	1	0	37	7
Barnet (loan)	2009–10	League Two	5	0	—		—		—		5	0
Rotherham United (loan)	2009–10	League Two	8	0	—		—		—		8	0
Crawley Town	2010–11	Conference Premier	41	12	7	2	—		2	1	50	15
Newport County	2011–12	Conference Premier	25	0	2	1	—		2	1	29	2
Luton Town (loan)	2011–12	Conference Premier	14	1	—		—		3 (Note: Appearances in Conference Premier play-offs)	0	17	1
Eastleigh	2012–13	Conference South	38	17	2	1	—		5 (Note: One appearance in FA Trophy, two in Hampshire Senior Cup, two in Conference South play-offs)	0	45	18
Eastleigh	2013–14	Conference South	36	13	1	0	—		4	2	41	15
Eastleigh	2014–15	Conference Premier	42	10	3	1	—		3 (Note: One appearance in FA Trophy, two in Conference Premier play-offs)	0	48	11
Eastleigh	Total		116	40	6	2	—		12	2	134	44
Sutton United	2015–16	National League South	22	7	4	1	—		4	0	30	8
Sutton United	2016–17	National League	12	1	0	0	—		4	1	16	2
Sutton United	Total		34	8	4	1	—		8	1	46	10
Eastbourne Borough (loan)	2016–17	National League South	5	1	2	0	—		0	—	7	1
Eastleigh	2016–17	National League	15	1	—		—		—		15	1
Eastleigh	2017–18	National League	24	2	1	0	—		0	0	25	2
Eastleigh	Total		39	3	1	0	—		0	0	40	3
Gosport Borough	2017–18	Southern League Premier Division	10	4	—		—		—		10	4
Blackfield & Langley	2017–18	Wessex League Premier Division	12	7	—		—		1 (Note: Appearance in Wessex League Cup)	0	13	7
Gosport Borough	2017–18	Southern League Premier Division	3	1	—		—		—		3	1
Career total			587	173	36	10	2	0	58	21	683	204

== Honours ==
Crawley Town

- Conference Premier: 2010–11

Eastleigh

- Conference South: 2013–14

Sutton United

- National League South: 2015–16

Blackfield & Langley

- Wessex League Premier Division: 2017–18
