= 2010–11 Exeter City F.C. season =

Exeter City
2010–11 season
- Manager: Paul Tisdale
- League One: 8th
- FA Cup: 2nd round
- Football League Trophy: Southern Section Area Final
- Top goalscorer: League: Jamie Cureton (17); All: Jamie Cureton (20)
- Highest home attendance: 7869 (vs Plymouth)
- Lowest home attendance: 3456 (vs Tranmere)

The 2010–11 season was Exeter's second season in League One, since their promotion the conference in 2009, and their 46th season in the third tier of English football. It was Paul Tisdale's fifth full season in charge at the club.

== Squad ==
=== Current squad ===
Updated 27 April 2011.

Note: Flags indicate national team as defined under FIFA eligibility rules; some limited exceptions apply. Players may hold more than one non-FIFA nationality.

| No. | Pos. | Nation | Player |
|---|---|---|---|
| 2 | DF | ENG | Steve Tully |
| 3 | DF | WAL | Richard Duffy |
| 4 | MF | ENG | James Dunne |
| 5 | DF | ENG | Troy Archibald-Henville |
| 6 | DF | ENG | Matt Taylor |
| 7 | MF | ENG | Ryan Harley (on loan from Swansea City) |
| 8 | MF | SCO | David Noble |
| 9 | FW | ENG | Adam Stansfield (Note: Player died during the course of the season.) |
| 10 | FW | WAL | Daniel Nardiello |
| 11 | DF | ENG | Scott Golbourne |
| 12 | FW | ENG | Jamie Cureton |
| 14 | MF | FRA | Bertie Cozic |
| 15 | DF | WAL | Rob Edwards |
| 17 | MF | ENG | Paul Tisdale (Manager) |
| 18 | DF | ENG | Billy Jones |

| No. | Pos. | Nation | Player |
|---|---|---|---|
| 19 | FW | ENG | Ben Watson |
| 20 | FW | ENG | Richard Logan |
| 21 | MF | TRI | Jake Thomson |
| 22 | MF | ENG | Liam Sercombe |
| 23 | DF | ENG | Lewis Tasker |
| 24 | MF | ENG | Elliott Frear |
| 26 | DF | ENG | Scot Bennett |
| 28 | GK | WAL | James Wood (on loan from Manchester City) |
| 29 | FW | IRL | John O'Flynn |
| 30 | GK | POL | Artur Krysiak |
| 31 | FW | ENG | James Norwood |
| 32 | MF | ENG | Dan Western |
| 33 | DF | IRL | Kallum Keane |
| 34 | MF | ENG | Aaron Dawson |
| 37 | FW | ENG | Tom Nichols |

== Competitions ==
| Competition | Started round | Current position / round | Final position / round | First match | Last match |
|---|---|---|---|---|---|
| Football League One | — | 8 | | 7 August 2010 | 8 May 2011 |
| Football League Cup | 1st round | — | 1st round | 10 August 2010 | 10 August 2010 |
| Football League Trophy | 1st round | — | Semi-Final | 31 August 2010 | 7 February 2011 |
| FA Cup | 1st round | — | R1 | 6 November 2010 | 6 November 2010 |

Updated to match played 26 April 2011
Source: Competitions

=== Football League One ===
==== Results summary ====
| Overall | | | | | | | | Home | | | | | | Away | | | | | |
| Pld | W | D | L | GF | GA | GD | Pts | W | D | L | GF | GA | GD | W | D | L | GF | GA | GD |
|---|---|---|---|---|---|---|---|---|---|---|---|---|---|---|---|---|---|---|---|
| 46 | 20 | 10 | 16 | 66 | 73 | −7 | 70 | 12 | 5 | 6 | 40 | 31 | +9 | 8 | 5 | 10 | 26 | 42 | −16 |

Last updated: 15 January 2020.
Source: Exeter FC

==== Fixtures and results ====
| 7 August 2010 | Exeter City | 2–2 | Colchester United | St James Park |
| | Harley 7' (pen.); Logan 87' | | Wordsworth 10', 11' | Attendance: 5,927 |

| 21 August 2010 | Exeter City | 2–2 | Bristol Rovers | St James Park |
| | Nardiello 9'; O'Flynn 75' (pen.); Duffy (red card) 48' | | Kuffour 45'; Hoskins 54' | Attendance: 7,401 |

| 28 August 2010 | Leyton Orient | 3–0 | Exeter City | Brisbane Road |
| | Revell 39'; McGleish 70'; Cox 80' | | | Attendance: 4,145 |

| 4 September 2010 | Exeter City | 1–0 | Charlton Athletic | St James Park |
| | Harley 90' (pen.) | | | Attendance: 5,743 |

| 11 September 2010 | Hartlepool United | 2–3 | Exeter City | Victoria Park |
| | Humphreys 38'; Sweeney 42' | | Harley 12'; O'Flynn 48', 57' | Attendance: 2,641 |

| 18 September 2010 | Exeter City | 2–2 | Peterborough United | St James Park |
| | Nardiello 54'; Cureton 71' | | Archibald-Henville 29' (o.g.); Tomlin 82' | Attendance: 5,146 |

| 21 September 2010 | Dagenham & Redbridge | 1–1 | Exeter City | Victoria Road |
| | Vincelot 71' | | Logan 5' | Attendance: 2,005 |

| 25 September 2010 | Yeovil Town | 1–3 | Exeter City | Huish Park |
| | S. Williams 57' | | Logan 23', 58'; Harley 75' | Attendance: 5,886 |

| 28 September 2010 | Bournemouth | 3–0 | Exeter City | Dean Court |
| | Symes 2', 68' (pen.); Pugh 29' | | | Attendance: 6,823 |

| 2 October 2010 | Exeter City | 1–0 | Rochdale | St James Park |
| | Cureton 49' | | | Attendance: 5,363 |

| 9 October 2010 | Walsall | 2–1 | Exeter City | Bescot Stadium |
| | Reid 32'; Richards 43' | | Harley 53'; Archibald-Henville (red card) 44' | Attendance: 3,776 |

| 16 October 2010 | Exeter City | 2–1 | Carlisle United | St James Park |
| | Logan 19', 22' | | Robson 71' | Attendance: 5,324 |

| 23 October 2010 | Milton Keynes Dons | 1–0 | Exeter City | Stadium:mk |
| | Wilbraham 53' | | | Attendance: 8,002 |

| 30 October 2010 | Exeter City | 2–4 | Brentford | St James Park |
| | Cureton 28', 78' | | Legge 4'; Alexander 62'; Wood 64'; MacDonald 72' | Attendance: 5,510 |

| 2 November 2010 | Brighton & Hove Albion | 3–0 | Exeter City | Withdean Stadium |
| | El-Abd 7'; Barnes 30' (pen.), 77' | | | Attendance: 7,212 |

| 13 November 2010 | Exeter City | 3–1 | Notts County | St James Park |
| | Cureton 18'; Logan 32'; Harley 66' | | Hughes 45' | Attendance: 5,302 |

| 20 November 2010 | Huddersfield Town | 0–1 | Exeter City | Galpharm Stadium |
| | | | Duffy 36' | Attendance: 13,108 |

| 23 November 2010 | Oldham Athletic | 3–3 | Exeter City | Boundary Park |
| | White 8'; Tounkara 17'; Taylor 42' | | Logan 77'; Cureton 85'; Nardiello 89' | Attendance: 3,561 |

| 11 December 2010 | Plymouth Argyle | 2–0 | Exeter City | Home Park |
| | Wright-Phillips 28', 57' | | | Attendance: 14,347 |

| 18 December 2010 | Exeter City | 5–1 | Sheffield Wednesday | St James Park |
| | Cureton 29', 72'; Sercombe 58'; Golbourne 61'; O'Flynn 88' | | Miller 31' | Attendance: 5,524 |

| 1 January 2011 | Southampton | 4–0 | Exeter City | St Mary's Stadium |
| | Guly 19', 51'; Lallana 66'; Barnard 90' | | | Attendance: 22,465 |

| 3 January 2011 | Exeter City | 1–2 | Brighton & Hove Albion | St James Park |
| | Logan 8' | | Murray 64'; Barnes 90' | Attendance: 6,352 |

| 8 January 2011 | Exeter City | 1–1 | Milton Keynes Dons | St James Park |
| | Cureton 8' | | Ibehre 73' | Attendance: 4,544 |

| 14 January 2011 | Brentford | 1–1 | Exeter City | Griffin Park |
| | Forster 90' | | O'Flynn 2' |

| 22 January 2011 | Exeter City | 2–1 | Walsall | St James Park |
| | Duffy 4'; Nardiello 77' | | Gray 85' | Attendance: 4,853 |

| 29 January 2011 | Swindon Town | 0–0 | Exeter City | County Ground |
| | | | | Attendance: 8,132 |

| 1 February 2011 | Exeter City | 1–2 | Southampton | St James Park |
| 19:45 | Nardiello 39' | | Lambert 70', 90' | Attendance: 6,370 |

| 5 February 2011 | Exeter City | 1–4 | Huddersfield Town | St James Park |
| 15:00 | Nardiello 90' | | Cadamarteri 55'; Roberts 67'; Pilkington 81'; Kilbane 88' | Attendance: 4,786 |

| 12 February 2011 | Notts County | 0–2 | Exeter City | Meadow Lane |
| 15:00 | | | Tull 54'; Talyor 73' | Attendance: 6,176 |

| 19 February 2011 | Charlton Athletic | 1–3 | Exeter City | The Valley |
| 15:00 | Wright-Phillips 86' | | Sercombe 64'; O'Flynn 77'; Harley 84' | Attendance: 24,767 |

| 22 February 2011 | Carlisle United | 2–2 | Exeter City | Brunton Park |
| 19:45 | Curran 9'; Zoko 45+1' | | Harley 13', 27' | Attendance: 3,962 |

| 26 February 2011 | Exeter City | 1–2 | Hartlepool United | St James Park |
| 19:45 | Cureton 59' | | Monkhouse 21', 29' | Attendance: 4,931 |

| 1 March 2011 | Exeter City | 1–1 | Tranmere Rovers | St James Park |
| 19:45 | Sercombe 16' | | Bakayogo 16' | Attendance: 3,456 |

| 5 March 2011 | Peterborough United | 3–0 | Exeter City | London Road |
| 15:00 | Boyd 10', 74'; Mackail-Smith 87' | | | Attendance: 6,174 |

| 8 March 2011 | Exeter City | 2–0 | Bournemouth | St James Park |
| 19:45 | Cureton 16'; Logan 59' | | | Attendance: 4,537 |

| 12 March 2011 | Rochdale | 0–1 | Exeter City | Spotland |
| 15:00 | | | Cureton 30' | Attendance: 2,726 |

| 19 March 2011 | Exeter City | 2–3 | Yeovil Town | St James Park |
| 15:00 | Cureton 25', 45+2' | | Williams 43'; Bowditch 58', 64' | Attendance: 5,841 |

| 26 March 2011 | Colchester United | 5–1 | Exeter City | Colchester Community Stadium |
| 13:00 | Gillespie 31', 77'; Mooney 73' (pen.); Vincent 76'; Bond 86' | | Nardiello 21'; Tully (red card) 36'; Golbourne (red card) 72' | Attendance: 3,629 |

| 29 March 2011 | Exeter City | 1–0 | Swindon Town | St James Park |
| 19:45 | Harley 79' | | | Attendance: 4,174 |

| 2 April 2011 | Exeter City | 2–1 | Dagenham & Redbridge | St James Park |
| 15:00 | Taylor 81'; Logan 87' | | Vincelot 76' | Attendance: 4,598 |

| 9 April 2011 | Bristol Rovers | 0–2 | Exeter City | Memorial Stadium |
| 15:00 | | | Nardiello 78', 90+2' | Attendance: 7,500 |

| 16 April 2011 | Exeter City | 2–1 | Leyton Orient | St James Park |
| 15:00 | Cureton 4', 79' | | Dean Cox 12' | Attendance: 5,036 |

| 22 April 2011 | Exeter City | 2–0 | Oldham Athletic | St James Park |
| 15:00 | Golbourne 34'; Cureton 42' | | | Attendance: 5,458 |

| 25 April 2011 | Tranmere Rovers | 4–0 | Exeter City | Prenton Park |
| 15:00 | Kay 44'; Akins 67', 90'; Showunmi 71' | | | Attendance: 5,017 |

| 30 April 2011 | Exeter City | 1–0 | Plymouth Argyle | St James Park |
| 12:00 | Dunne 46' | | | Attendance: 7,869 |

| 7 May 2011 | Sheffield Wednesday | 1–2 | Exeter City | Hillsborough |
| 15:00 | Johnson 13' | | Nardiello 76'; Archibald-Henville 89' | Attendance: 21,085 |

==== League table ====
| Pos | Team | Pld | W | D | L | GF | GA | GD | Pts | Promotion, qualification or relegation |
|---|---|---|---|---|---|---|---|---|---|---|
| 6 | Bournemouth | 46 | 19 | 14 | 13 | 75 | 54 | +21 | 71 | Qualification for League One play-offs |
| 7 | Leyton Orient | 46 | 19 | 13 | 14 | 71 | 62 | +9 | 70 | |
| 8 | Exeter City | 46 | 20 | 10 | 16 | 66 | 73 | −7 | 70 | |
| 9 | Rochdale | 46 | 18 | 14 | 14 | 63 | 55 | +8 | 68 | |
| 10 | Colchester United | 46 | 16 | 14 | 16 | 57 | 63 | −6 | 62 | |

Updated to match(es) played on 2 May 2011. Source: BBC
Rules for classification: 1) points; 2) goal difference; 3) number of goals scored.

=== League Cup ===
| 10 August 2010 First round | Exeter City | 2–3 (a.e.t.) | Ipswich Town | St James Park |
| | Harley 54', 81' | | Murray 63'; Norris 73', 99' | Attendance: 4,520 |

=== Football League Trophy ===
| 31 August 2010 Round 1 | Yeovil Town | 1–3 | Exeter City | Huish Park |
| | Welsh 76'; S. Williams (red card) 45' | | Cureton 10', 78'; Harley 90' | Attendance: 2,954 |

| 5 October 2010 Round 2 | Hereford United | 0–3 | Exeter City | Edgar Street |
| | | | Nardiello 12' (pen.); O'Flynn 53'; Duffy 90' | Attendance: 1,286 |

| 9 November 2010 Quarter Final | Plymouth Argyle | 1–2 | Exeter City | Home Park |
| | Clark 52' | | Harley 2'; Nardiello 90' | Attendance: 9,431 |

| 14 December 2010 Semi-final | Bristol Rovers | 2–2 (4–5 p) | Exeter City | Memorial Stadium |
| | Hoskins 20'; Swallow 78' | | Anthony 65' (o.g.); Harley 89' | Attendance: 3,881 |
| | Penalties |
| | Hoskins (penalty scored); Lines (penalty scored); Coles (penalty scored); Anthony (penalty missed); Richards (penalty scored) | | Harley (penalty scored); Jones (penalty scored); Nardiello (penalty scored); Noble (penalty scored); Duffy (penalty scored) |

| 17 January 2011 Southern Final Leg 1 | Brentford | 1–1 | Exeter City | Griffin Park |
| | Alexander 64' | | Cureton 39' |

| 7 February 2011 Southern Final Leg 2 | Exeter City | 1–2 | Brentford | St James Park |
| | Nardiello 90' | | Saunders 20'; Alexander 26' | Attendance: 5,322 |

=== FA Cup ===
| 6 November 2010 First round | Bury | 2–0 | Exeter City | Gigg Lane |
| | Sodje 28'; Lees 53' | | | Attendance: 2,359 |
