= Richard Duffy =

Welsh footballer (born 1985)

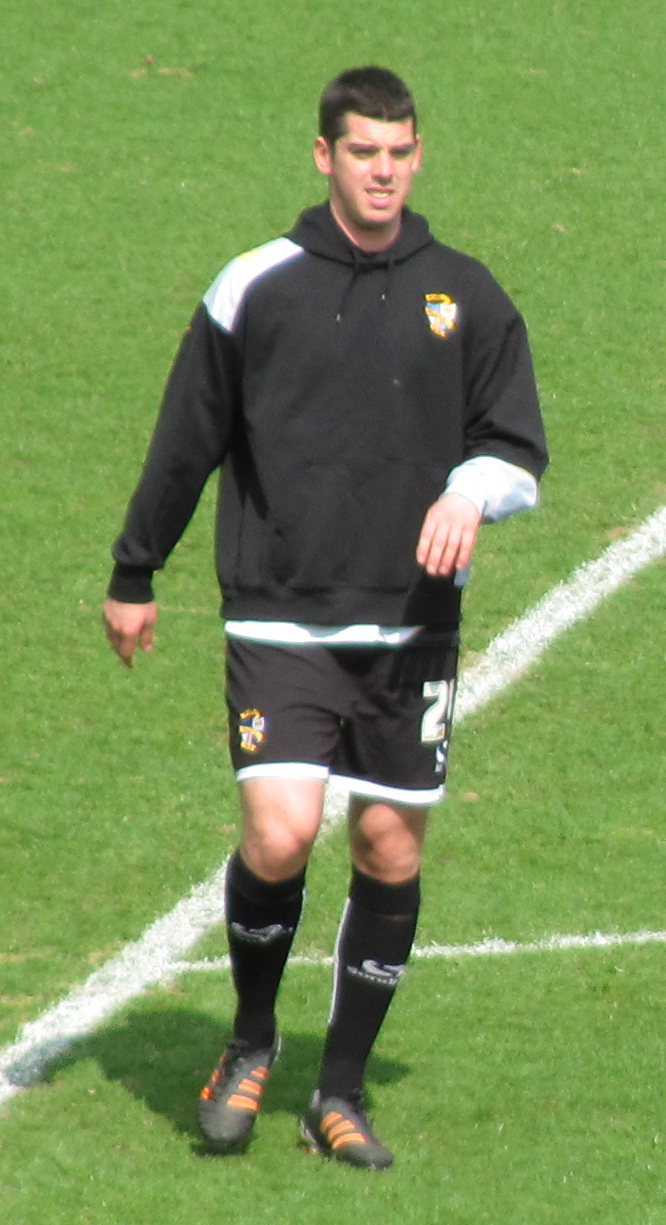
- Duffy warming up for Port Vale in 2013

Personal information
- Full name: Richard Michael Duffy
- Date of birth: 30 August 1985 (age 41)
- Place of birth: Swansea, Wales
- Height: 1.78 m (5 ft 10 in)
- Position: Defender

Team information
- Current team: Congleton Town (player-manager)

Youth career
- 1994–2001: Swansea City

Senior career*
Years	Team	Apps	(Gls)
2001–2004	Swansea City	18	(1)
2004–2009	Portsmouth	1	(0)
2004	→ Burnley (loan)	7	(1)
2005	→ Coventry City (loan)	14	(0)
2005–2006	→ Coventry City (loan)	32	(0)
2006	→ Coventry City (loan)	13	(0)
2007	→ Swansea City (loan)	11	(0)
2008	→ Coventry City (loan)	2	(0)
2009	Millwall	12	(0)
2009–2012	Exeter City	112	(3)
2012–2016	Port Vale	136	(1)
2016	Eastleigh	0	(0)
2016–2019	Notts County	104	(7)
2019–2020	Kidsgrove Athletic	21	(0)
2021–	Congleton Town	15	(3)

International career
2001–2002	Wales U17	4	(0)
2002–2003	Wales U19	3	(0)
2004–2006	Wales U21	7	(0)
2005–2008	Wales	13	(0)

Managerial career
- 2021–: Congleton Town
- * Club domestic league appearances and goals

Richard Michael Duffy (born 30 August 1985) is a Welsh former professional footballer who is the player-manager at Northern Premier League Division One West club Congleton Town. A versatile player who can play either on the right or at the centre of defence, he won 13 caps for Wales between 2005 and 2008. He is the younger brother of Robert Duffy.

He began his career at Swansea City, making his debut as a 16-year-old in December 2001, before winning a six-figure sum move to Premier League side Portsmouth in January 2004. He never broke into the first-team picture at Fratton Park and instead enjoyed numerous loan moves at Burnley, Coventry City, and former club Swansea. He switched to Millwall in February 2009 before signing with Exeter City in July 2009. He joined Port Vale in July 2012 and helped the club to secure promotion out of League Two in 2012–13. He stayed at the club for four years before joining Notts County via Eastleigh in June 2016. He joined Kidsgrove Athletic in August 2019.

He began coaching at Congleton Town in May 2020 and was appointed as the club's manager 12 months later. Congleton won the Midland League Premier Division title and Midland League Cup at the end of the 2023–24 season.

== Club career ==
=== Swansea City ===
Duffy began his career at Swansea City, making his senior debut under Colin Addison as a 16-year-old on 8 December 2001, in a 4–1 defeat to Macclesfield Town at Moss Rose; he was a 64th-minute substitute for Michael Howard. However, a bout of spondylosis in his lower back kept him out injured for over a year.

He returned to fitness at the start of the 2003–04 season and soon won a regular place in the first team. He scored his first career goal in a 3–0 home win over Macclesfield on 16 September. Despite only having played 18 Third Division games, the Wales youth international soon began to attract the attention of scouts from bigger clubs, and in January 2004 he was sold to Premier League side Portsmouth on a four-year contract for a six-figure sum (believed to be £300,000). He had forced through the move after rejecting Swansea's offer of a three-year contract, despite manager Brian Flynn's insistence that he would remain at Vetch Field. Flynn also accused Portsmouth of trying to unsettle the youngster.

"The Swans have offered him a fresh deal but he hasn't signed anything and is entitled to speak to other clubs from 1 January. The club could take cash up front or gamble on getting more from the tribunal in terms of compensation because Richard is under the age of 24. Richard knows a move to Portsmouth would be a big lift for his full international prospects with Wales. Soccer can be a relatively short career – a bad injury has ended so many dreams too early. I'm telling Richard to be sensible, but also to make the most of any opportunities that come along."

— Duffy's agent, Wayne Elsey, was keen on the move to Portsmouth.

=== Portsmouth ===
Harry Redknapp handed Duffy his Premier League debut at Fratton Park on 1 May 2004, putting him on for Linvoy Primus 22 minutes into a 1–1 draw with Fulham. At the beginning of the 2004–05 season he was loaned out to Steve Cotterill's Burnley for four weeks. He gained much admiration from the Burnley fans for his excellent performances, and the loan deal was extended into another month. He scored in the "Clarets" 2–1 win over Leeds United at Elland Road. The young Welshman spent some of his loan spell at Turf Moor playing as a right-winger. He joined fellow Championship side Coventry City on a three-month loan in January 2005, becoming Micky Adams's first signing at Highfield Road. He played 15 games for the "Sky Blues", helping the club to narrowly avoid relegation.

He spent the entirety of the 2005–06 season on loan at Coventry City. He made 34 appearances at the club, helping Coventry to a respectable eighth-place finish. He was also handed a new contract with Portsmouth in March 2006, causing Coventry boss Micky Adams to snipe, "I am sure it will be nice playing in their reserves." In October 2006, he was loaned to Coventry for the third time, in a deal which was extended until 1 January 2007. This followed the collapse of an expected loan move to Queens Park Rangers. He played 13 games before returning to the South coast. On 10 January, a loan to former club Swansea City was agreed until the end of the 2006–07 season. He featured in 11 League One games for the "Swans", falling somewhat out of favour after manager Kenny Jackett was replaced by Roberto Martínez.

In March 2008, Duffy rejoined Coventry City for the fourth time on loan until the end of the 2007–08 season. However, he tore a thigh muscle the following month, and was sidelined for the rest of the season. He was told he was free to leave Portsmouth in January 2009, having started just the one game for "Pompey" in five years.

=== Millwall ===
In February 2009, Duffy joined Kenny Jackett's Millwall on a contract until the end of the season. He played 12 League One games for the "Lions", but was one of ten players released from The Den in May 2009.

=== Exeter City ===
In July 2009, Duffy signed for newly-promoted League One side Exeter City. He made 44 appearances in the 2009–10 season, picking up a total of 12 yellow cards during the campaign. He made 50 appearances in 2010–11. He again helped Paul Tisdale's side to exceed expectations by finishing just three points outside the play-offs. Duffy signed a new one-year contract with the "Grecians" in May 2011. Despite injury concerns, he remained a key player at St James Park in 2011–12, as he played 34 games; despite his efforts the club suffered relegation in 23rd place.

=== Port Vale ===
Duffy signed a two-year contract with League Two side Port Vale in July 2012; this move reunited him with former Coventry boss Micky Adams. He admitted that having Micky Adams as his manager was the main reason he chose to come to Vale Park. He replaced Adam Yates as Vale's preferred right-back at the start of the 2012–13 season, but struggled when he was tried out at centre-back in the Football League Trophy. Vale were promoted at the end of the 2012–13 season, with Duffy putting in 39 appearances.

Duffy returned to the centre-half role alongside Chris Robertson in the 2013–14 season after Liam Chilvers was taken ill in mid-November. He went on to finish the campaign with 30 appearances to his name, helping the club to a ninth-place finish in League One. He signed a new two-year contract in June 2014.

He started the 2014–15 season in a centre-back partnership with Ryan McGivern. He played a total of 29 games throughout the campaign. He started the 2015–16 season competing with Ryan Inniss and Remie Streete for one of two available centre-back places. He impressed manager Rob Page, who praised his organisation skills and fitness levels. His consistency meant that he went on to establish himself as the established centre-back alongside one of Inniss, Streete and McGivern. In February he stated that he hoped to win a new contract in the summer and that he was "in a good place with my family. I'm settled here".

=== Notts County ===
On 27 May 2016, Duffy rejected a new contract at Port Vale and dropped down two divisions to sign a two-year contract with National League club Eastleigh; manager Chris Todd described him as "one of my top targets this summer". However, four weeks later he had his contract with Eastleigh cancelled so that he could sign a one-year contract with League Two club Notts County. He made 47 appearances across the 2016–17 campaign. In February 2017 he had an appearance-based contract extension clause removed from his contract so that he would be available for selection under new manager Kevin Nolan. Later that month Nolan stated that "he's probably been our best player all season". The next month was included in the EFL Team of the Week after making a "brilliant last-ditch block" to deny Wycombe Wanderers an equalising goal in a 1–0 win.

On 6 February 2018, he played his former club, Swansea City, in the FA Cup, which ended in an 8–1 defeat. Nevertheless, he scored two goals in 43 league appearances to help the "Magpies" to qualify for the play-offs at the end of the 2017–18 campaign. He also filled in as captain during absences by Michael O'Connor and the Nottingham Post reported that he had an "outstanding season". He was offered new contract by Notts County at the end of the 2017–18 season. He missed three months at the start of the 2018–19 season with a hamstring injury. Speaking in April, manager Neal Ardley stated that "he has been excellent [and] he has been part of the reason why we have looked solid at the back". County were relegated at the end of the campaign, ending a 131-year stay in the Football League. He was released by Notts County at the end of the 2018–19 season.

=== Kidsgrove Athletic ===
On 21 August 2019, Duffy joined Northern Premier League Division One South East club Kidsgrove Athletic. Manager Ryan Austin said that "he brings real quality to our squad as well as vast experience. We've been looking for a leader, and an organiser for a long time and, Rich fits that role perfectly". The 2019–20 season was formally abandoned on 26 March, with all results from the season being expunged, due to the COVID-19 pandemic in England.

== International career ==
Duffy won four caps for the Wales under-17 team, three caps for the under-19 side, as well as seven caps for the under-21s.

Duffy made his full international debut for Wales at the Liberty Stadium in a goalless draw with Slovenia on 17 August 2005. Manager John Toshack predicted a bright future for the young defender. He then played in a 1–0 defeat to England on 3 September 2005, and was said to have "acquitted himself well on the right". He further played against Poland four days later, and gave away a penalty for a foul on Kamil Kosowski, which was converted for the only goal of the game.

He featured as a substitute in a 3–2 win over Northern Ireland on 8 October 2005, and in a BBC report was marked 7 out of 10 for his "faultless display" and was noted as having "made some crucial clearances under heavy pressure". Coming on as a second-half substitute in a goalless draw with Bulgaria on 15 August 2006, he was described as "impressive" in a BBC report. He played 64 minutes of a 2–0 loss to Brazil on 5 September 2006. He later played in the 5–1 defeat to Slovakia on 7 October 2006. He also played the first half of a 4–0 friendly win over Liechtenstein on 14 November 2006.

He was dropped from the squad in May 2007, but made a return in March 2008 for the friendly encounter with Luxembourg. In total he won 13 caps for his country in a three-year international career.

== Style of play ==
Duffy could operate as a right-back or at the centre of defence. A player with good leadership skills, he described himself as "a ball-playing centre-half" and has said that "I like to play, not just hump it, and I'm a good communicator too."

== Managerial career ==
In May 2020, Duffy was appointed as assistant manager to Ryan Austin at North West Counties League Premier Division side Congleton Town. He succeeded Austin as manager on 24 May 2021, who resigned for personal reasons. Duffy also registered as a player. Congleton were crowned Midland League Premier Division champions at the end of the 2023–24 season. Congleton also beat Highgate United 5–1 in the Midland League Cup final. Congleton finished third in the Northern Premier League Division One West in the 2024–25 season, though missed out on a second-successive promotion after losing to Hednesford Town in the play-off final.

== Personal life ==
Duffy admitted driving under the influence in January 2011 after a "silly mistake" following a meal out with friends; he was banned from driving for 12 months and fined £700. He pledged his support to an Exeter based anti-drink-driving campaign and said that "I can only apologise for my actions. It was the first time I have done this and it will be the last. As a role model, especially to young people, this is not an example I should be setting... It just goes to prove that you can never be sure if you take a risk. I hope people reading this will heed the warning."

== Career statistics ==
=== Club ===
Appearances and goals by club, season and competition
Club	Season	League			FA Cup		EFL Cup		Other		Total	
Club	Season	Division	Apps	Goals	Apps	Goals	Apps	Goals	Apps	Goals	Apps	Goals
Swansea City	2001–02	Third Division	0	0	1	0	0	0	0	0	1	0
Swansea City	2002–03	Third Division	0	0	0	0	0	0	0	0	0	0
Swansea City	2003–04	Third Division	18	1	3	0	0	0	1 (Note: Appearance(s) in the Football League Trophy / EFL Trophy)	0	22	1
Swansea City	Total		18	1	4	0	0	0	1	0	23	1
Portsmouth	2003–04	Premier League	1	0	—		—		—		1	0
Portsmouth	2004–05	Premier League	0	0	0	0	0	0	—		0	0
Portsmouth	2005–06	Premier League	0	0	0	0	0	0	—		0	0
Portsmouth	2006–07	Premier League	0	0	0	0	1	0	—		1	0
Portsmouth	2007–08	Premier League	0	0	0	0	0	0	—		0	0
Portsmouth	2008–09	Premier League	0	0	0	0	0	0	0	0	0	0
Portsmouth	Total		1	0	0	0	1	0	0	0	2	0
Burnley (loan)	2004–05	Championship	7	1	0	0	2	0	—		9	1
Coventry City (loan)	2004–05	Championship	14	0	1	0	—		—		15	0
Coventry City (loan)	2005–06	Championship	32	0	2	0	0	0	—		34	0
Coventry City (loan)	2006–07	Championship	13	0	0	0	—		—		13	0
Coventry City (loan)	2007–08	Championship	2	0	0	0	0	0	—		2	0
Coventry City (loan)	Total		61	0	3	0	0	0	0	0	64	0
Swansea City (loan)	2006–07	League One	11	0	1	0	—		—		12	0
Millwall	2008–09	League One	12	0	—		—		—		12	0
Exeter City	2009–10	League One	42	1	1	0	1	0	0	0	44	1
Exeter City	2010–11	League One	42	2	1	0	1	0	6	1	50	3
Exeter City	2011–12	League One	28	0	2	0	2	0	2	0	34	0
Exeter City	Total		112	3	4	0	4	0	8	1	128	4
Port Vale	2012–13	League Two	36	0	1	0	0	0	2	0	39	0
Port Vale	2013–14	League One	28	0	2	0	0	0	1	0	31	0
Port Vale	2014–15	League One	27	1	1	0	0	0	1	0	29	1
Port Vale	2015–16	League One	45	0	3	0	2	0	2	0	52	0
Port Vale	Total		136	1	7	0	2	0	6	0	151	1
Eastleigh	2016–17	National League	0	0	0	0	—		0	0	0	0
Notts County	2016–17	League Two	42	4	3	0	1	0	1	0	47	4
Notts County	2017–18	League Two	43	2	5	1	0	0	2 (Note: Appearance(s) in the play-offs)	0	50	3
Notts County	2018–19	League Two	19	1	0	0	1	0	2	0	22	1
Notts County	Total		104	7	8	1	2	0	5	0	119	8
Kidsgrove Athletic	2019–20	Northern Premier League; Division One South East	21	0	4	0	2	0	5 (Note: Four appearances in the FA Trophy and one appearance in the Staffordshire Senior Cup)	1	32	1
Congleton Town	2021–22	NWCL Premier Division	0	0	0	0	0	0	0	0	0	0
Congleton Town	2023–24	ML Premier Division	15	3	0	0	0	0	2	0	17	3
Congleton Town	2024–25	Northern Premier League; Division One West	0	0	0	0	0	0	0	0	0	0
Career total			498	16	31	1	13	0	27	2	569	19

=== International ===
Appearances and goals by national team and year
National team	Year	Apps	Goals
Wales	2005	6	0
Wales	2006	5	0
Wales	2007	1	0
Wales	2008	1	0
Total		13	0

== Honours ==
=== Playing ===
Port Vale

- Football League Two third-place promotion: 2012–13

=== Managerial ===
Congleton Town

- Midland League Premier Division: 2023–24
- Midland League Cup: 2024
