= Troy Archibald-Henville =

English footballer and coach

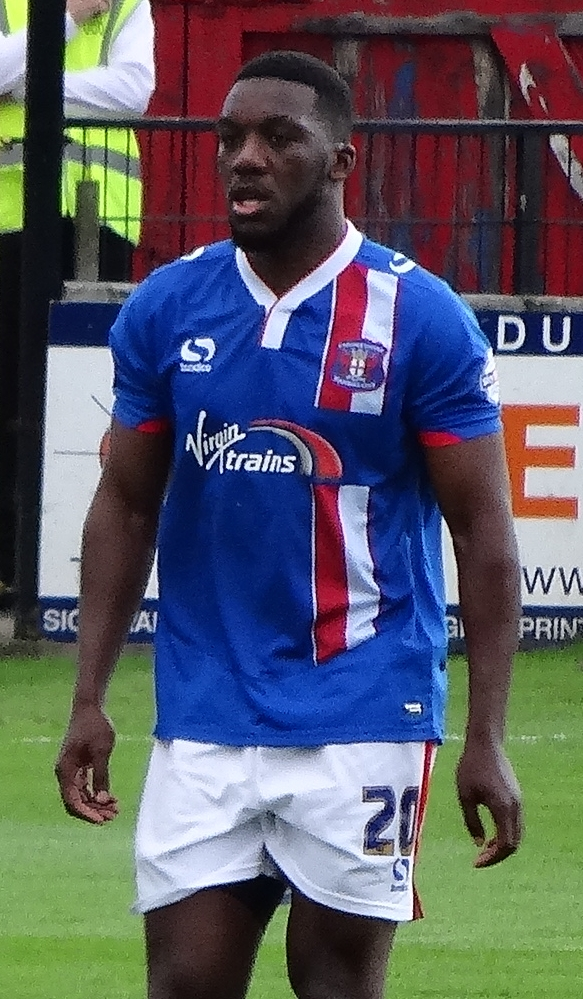
- Archibald-Henville playing for Carlisle United in 2015

Personal information
- Full name: Troy Patrick Archibald-Henville
- Date of birth: 4 November 1988 (age 37)
- Place of birth: Newham, England
- Height: 6 ft 2 in (1.88 m)
- Position: Defender

Youth career
- 2004–2006: Tottenham Hotspur

Senior career*
Years	Team	Apps	(Gls)
2006–2010	Tottenham Hotspur	0	(0)
2008	→ Norwich City (loan)	0	(0)
2009	→ Exeter City (loan)	19	(0)
2009–2010	→ Exeter City (loan)	15	(0)
2010–2012	Exeter City	81	(3)
2012–2014	Swindon Town	19	(0)
2013	→ Carlisle United (loan)	4	(0)
2014–2016	Carlisle United	36	(3)
2016–2018	Exeter City	20	(0)
Total		194	(6)
- * Club domestic league appearances and goals

Troy Patrick Archibald-Henville (born 4 November 1988) is an English retired professional footballer who is a youth coach for Tottenham Hotspur.

== Playing career ==
=== Tottenham Hotspur ===
Born in Newham, London, Archibald-Henville joined Tottenham Hotspur full-time in 2005 after a successful spell towards the end of the 2004–05 season. He made the step up to the reserves in 2007 making 15 appearances in total, scoring two goals. His impressive performances earned him the captain's armband for the reserves. He was named on the substitutes bench for the first team on two occasions, including the North London derby at Arsenal in December 2007.

==== Norwich City ====
For the 2008–09 season, Norwich City took Archibald-Henville on what was initially a season long loan, but he returned to Tottenham without making a league appearance.

==== Exeter City ====
On 20 January 2009, Archibald-Henville signed on loan for Exeter City, and made his debut for the club that night, in a 2–1 win against Dagenham & Redbridge. During his time there, Archibald-Henville was hailed as "terrific" by Exeter manager Paul Tisdale.

Before his debut, Exeter asked the Football League if they could just put "Troy" on the back of his shirt but were told the entire surname had to be there, without exception.

At the end of the Grecians' successful 2008–09 season, which saw them win promotion to League One, Archibald-Henville returned to his parent club in a bid to win a new contract with Spurs. He signed a new deal at Tottenham until 2010.

In July 2009, he signed another six-month loan deal with Exeter.

=== Exeter City ===
On 1 February 2010, it was announced that Archibald-Henville had signed a permanent deal with Exeter City, moving from Tottenham Hotspur for an undisclosed fee. However, he sustained a knee injury shortly after his signing, ruling him out of action for the remainder of the 2009–10 season and the start of the 2010–11 season. After recovering from the injury, he made 81 appearances for Exeter over the 2010–11 and 2011–12 seasons, and was the Exeter supporters' "player of the year" for 2011–12.

=== Swindon Town ===
At the end of the 2011–12 season, Archibald-Henville's contract with Exeter expired. Exeter offered him a new contract, but he instead signed a two-year deal with Swindon Town, who had just been promoted to League One.

==== Carlisle United ====
Due to injuries, Archibald-Henville found it difficult to gain match fitness to force his way into the Town side, so he joined fellow League One side Carlisle on a month-long loan deal in September 2013. The deal was a success, but was cut short due to a knee injury which required surgery. He returned to Swindon Town and made 15 more appearances for the club, as they tried to force their way into the League One play-off.

=== Carlisle United ===
Following his release from Swindon Town at the end of the 2013–14 season, Archibald-Henville penned a two-year deal with Carlisle United, who had been relegated to League Two. He missed the start of the 2014–15 season with a shin injury, and made his first appearance in a 3–0 defeat to Bury in September.

=== Return to Exeter City ===
On 27 June 2016 Archibald-Henville signed with his former club Exeter City following his release from Carlisle.

He was released by Exeter at the end of the 2017–18 season.

== Coaching career ==
In July 2019 Archibald-Henville assumed a revised role at Tottenham Hotspur, the club with which he began his playing career, as an academy coach assigned with assisting older youth-level players in a pastoral development role.

== Career statistics ==
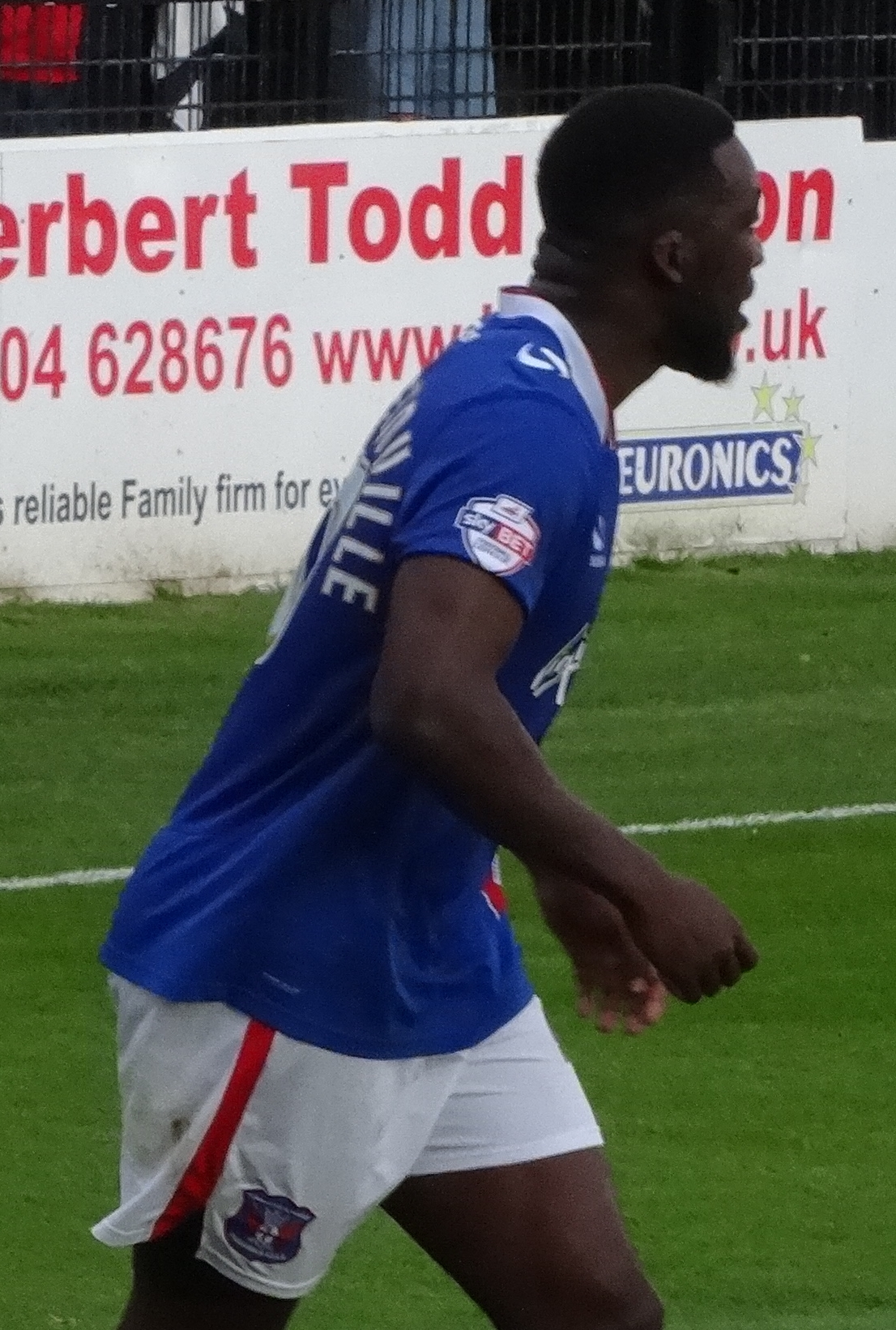
Archibald-Henville playing for Carlisle United in 2015

As of match played 29 August 2017

Appearances and goals by club, season and competition
Club	Season	League			FA Cup		League Cup		Other (Note: Includes Football League Trophy matches.)		Total	
Club	Season	Division	Apps	Goals	Apps	Goals	Apps	Goals	Apps	Goals	Apps	Goals
Tottenham Hotspur	2007–08	Premier League	0	0	0	0	0	0	—		0	0
Tottenham Hotspur	2008–09	Premier League	0	0	0	0	0	0	—		0	0
Tottenham Hotspur	2009–10	Premier League	0	0	0	0	0	0	—		0	0
Tottenham Hotspur	Total		0	0	0	0	0	0	0	0	0	0
Norwich City (loan)	2008–09	Championship	0	0	0	0	0	0	—		0	0
Exeter City (loan)	2008–09	League Two	19	0	0	0	0	0	0	0	19	0
Exeter City (loan)	2009–10	League One	15	0	1	0	0	0	1	0	17	0
Exeter City	2009–10	League One	0	0	0	0	0	0	0	0	0	0
Exeter City	2010–11	League One	36	1	1	0	0	0	6	0	43	1
Exeter City	2011–12	League One	45	2	2	0	2	0	2	0	51	2
Exeter City	Total		115	3	4	0	2	0	9	0	130	3
Swindon Town	2012–13	League One	5	0	1	0	2	1	0	0	8	1
Swindon Town	2013–14	League One	14	0	0	0	0	0	1	0	15	0
Swindon Town	Total		19	0	1	0	2	1	1	0	23	1
Carlisle United (loan)	2013–14	League One	4	0	0	0	0	0	0	0	4	0
Carlisle United	2014–15	League Two	24	1	0	0	0	0	0	0	24	1
Carlisle United	2015–16	League Two	12	2	0	0	1	0	0	0	13	2
Carlisle United	Total		40	3	0	0	1	0	0	0	41	3
Exeter City	2016–17	League Two	3	0	1	0	0	0	0	0	4	0
Exeter City	2017–18	League Two	17	0	2	0	1	0	2	0	22	0
Exeter City	Total		20	0	3	0	1	0	2	0	26	0
Career total			195	6	8	0	6	1	12	0	221	7
