= Scot Bennett =

English footballer

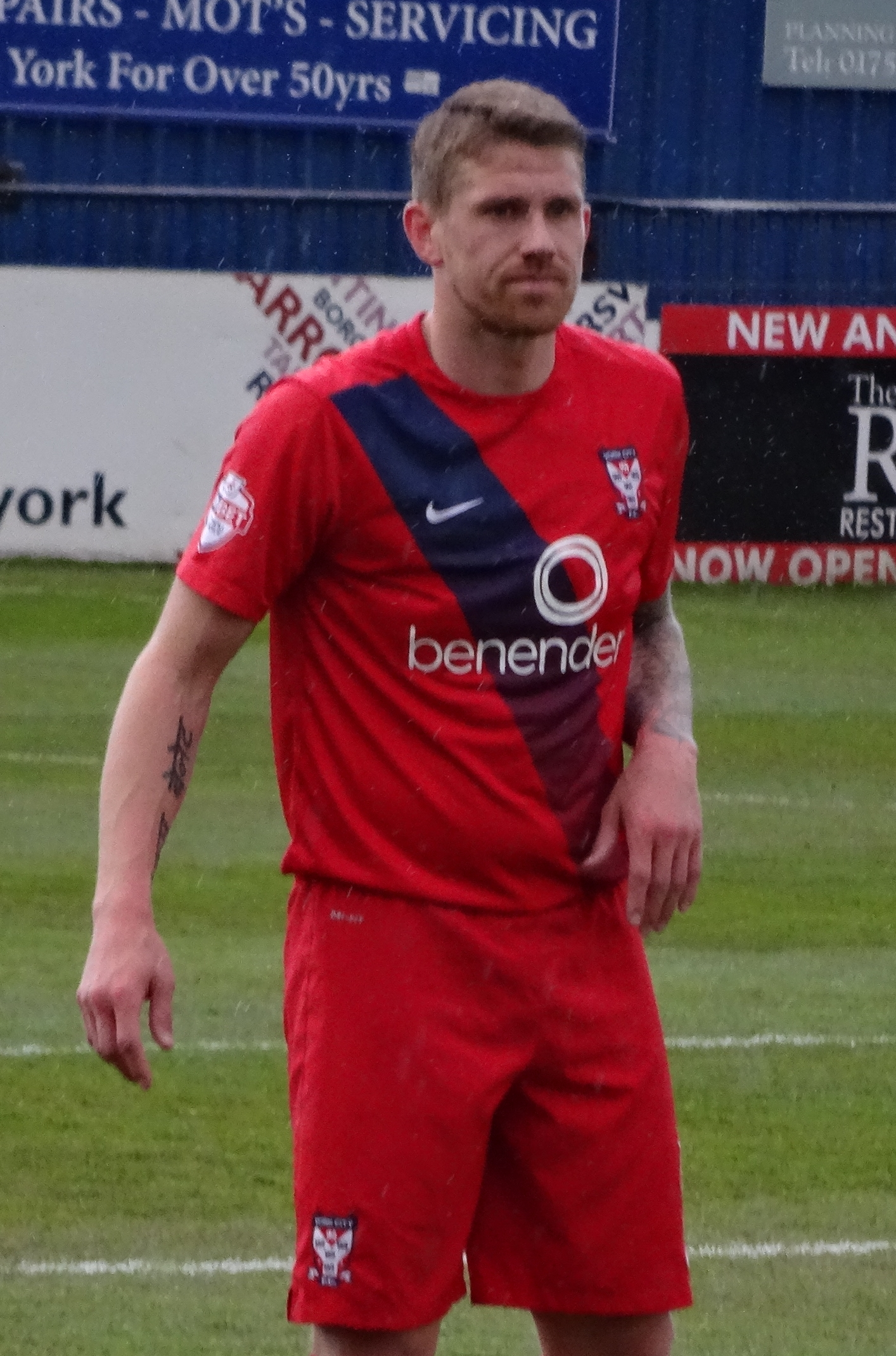
- Bennett playing for York City in 2016

Personal information
- Full name: Scot Andrew Bennett
- Date of birth: 30 November 1990 (age 35)
- Place of birth: Newquay, England
- Height: 5 ft 10 in (1.78 m)
- Positions: Defender; midfielder

Team information
- Current team: Weston-super-Mare
- Number: 27

Youth career
- –2008: Exeter City

Senior career*
Years	Team	Apps	(Gls)
2008–2015	Exeter City	132	(18)
2015–2016	Notts County	6	(0)
2015	→ Newport County (loan)	12	(0)
2016	→ York City (loan)	11	(0)
2016–2024	Newport County	288	(9)
2024–2026	Cheltenham Town	32	(0)
2026	→ Weston-super-Mare (loan)	18	(0)
2026–	Weston-super-Mare	3	(1)
- * Club domestic league appearances and goals as of 20:49, 24 August 2026 (UTC)

Scot Andrew Bennett (born 30 November 1990) is an English professional footballer who plays as a defender or midfielder for Weston-super-Mare.

== Career ==
=== Exeter City ===
Bennett was born in Newquay, Cornwall and started his career with Exeter City's youth system. He made his first-team debut for Exeter as a substitute in the 74th minute of a 1–0 home victory over Swindon Town in League One on 29 March 2011.

Bennett scored his first goal on 26 November 2011 in a 3–0 home win over Tranmere Rovers. Bennett signed a new contract, the length of which was undisclosed, with Exeter in April 2012. In July 2014, Exeter manager Paul Tisdale announced that Bennett would succeed Danny Coles as captain.

=== Notts County ===
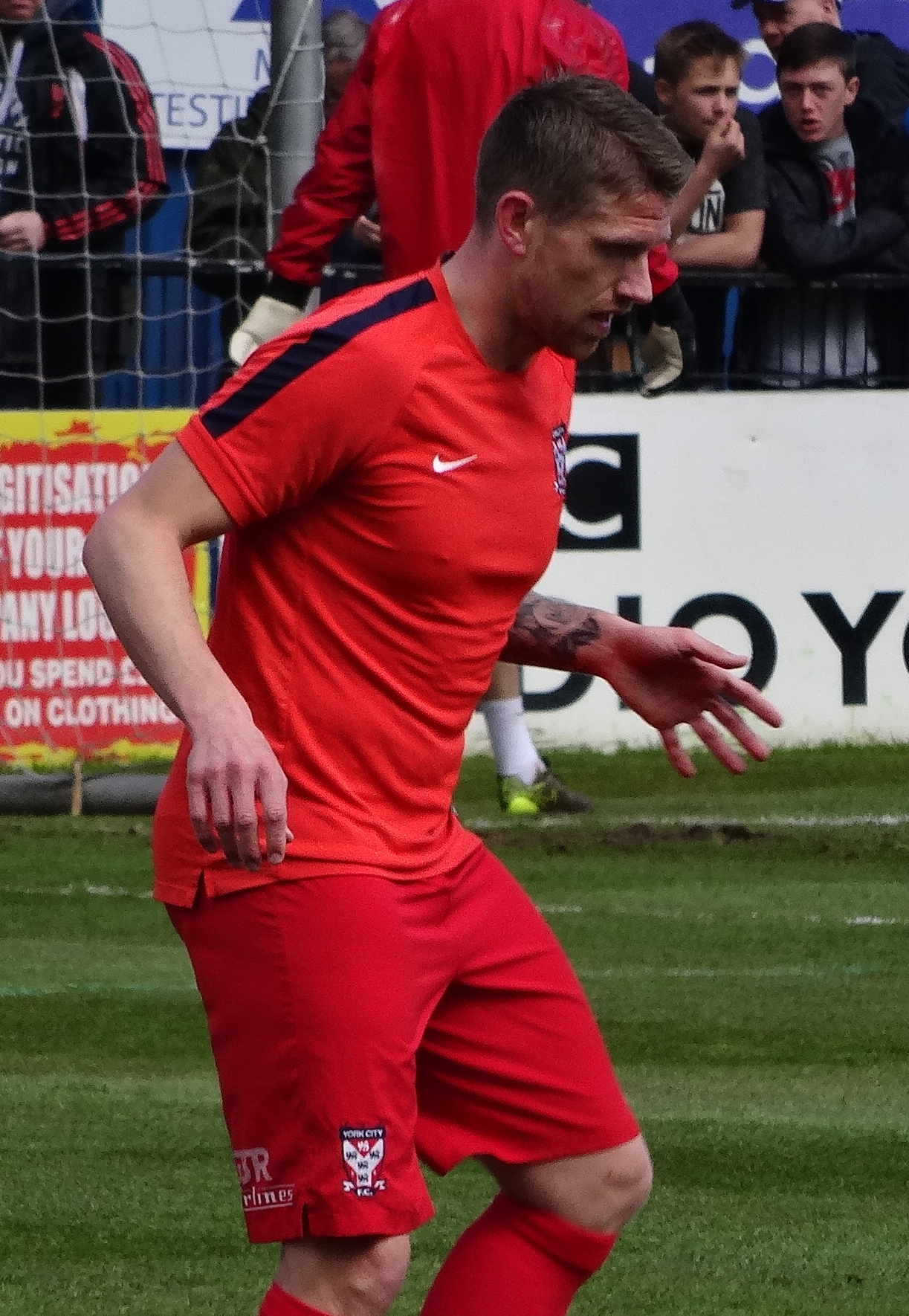
Bennett training with York City in 2016

Bennett signed for newly relegated League Two club Notts County on a two-year contract on 27 May 2015. On 8 October 2015, he joined Notts County's divisional rivals Newport County on loan until January 2016. He made his debut for Newport when starting in their 3–0 away defeat against Mansfield Town on 10 October 2015. Bennett scored his first goal for Newport on 8 November 2015 in their 2–2 away draw with Brackley Town in the FA Cup first round. He was recalled by Notts County on 31 December 2015.

On 11 March 2016, Bennett joined Notts County's League Two rivals York City on loan until the end of the 2015–16 season. He debuted the following day when starting York's 1–1 home draw with Barnet.

=== Newport County ===
Bennett's contract at Notts County was cancelled by mutual consent on 2 June 2016, and the same day he rejoined Newport County on a two-year contract. Bennett was part of the Newport squad that completed the 'Great Escape' with a 2–1 victory at home to Notts County on the final day of the 2016–17 season, which ensured Newport's survival in League Two. Bennett signed a new two-year contract with Newport in April 2018. He was part of the team that reached the League Two play-off final at Wembley Stadium on 25 May 2019. Newport lost to Tranmere Rovers 1–0 after a goal in the 119th minute.

In June 2020 Bennett was released by Newport County at the end of the 2019–20 season due to the club's Coronavirus pandemic financial concerns. Bizarrely, in July 2020 Bennett was selected as Newport's Player of the Year for the 2019-20 season. On 4 August 2020 Bennett rejoined Newport on a one-year contract. Bennett played for Newport in the League Two play-off final at Wembley Stadium on 31 May 2021 which Newport lost to Morecambe, 1–0 after a 107th minute penalty. In June 2021 his Newport contract was extended for a further two years. In June 2023 Bennett's Newport contract was extended for a further year.

On 4 June 2024, the club confirmed that Bennett would be departing the club on 30 June 2024 upon the expiration of his contract.

=== Cheltenham Town ===
Bennett signed for newly relegated League Two club Cheltenham Town on 14 June 2024, linking up with his former manager at Newport, Michael Flynn.

On 18 April 2025, Bennett made his 25th league start of the season for the club, triggering an extension to his contract.

On 9 February 2026, Bennett joined National League South club Weston-super-Mare on loan for the remainder of the season.

On 5 May 2026, Cheltenham announced the player would leave in the summer once his contract expired.

=== Weston-super-Mare ===
On 5 August 2026, Bennett joined Weston-super-Mare on a permanent basis.

== Style of play ==
Bennett plays as a defender or midfielder.

== Career statistics ==
As of match played 2 May 2026

Appearances and goals by club, season and competition
Club	Season	League			FA Cup		League Cup		Other		Total	
Club	Season	Division	Apps	Goals	Apps	Goals	Apps	Goals	Apps	Goals	Apps	Goals
Exeter City	2008–09	League Two	0	0	0	0	0	0	0	0	0	0
Exeter City	2009–10	League One	0	0	0	0	0	0	0	0	0	0
Exeter City	2010–11	League One	1	0	0	0	0	0	0	0	1	0
Exeter City	2011–12	League One	15	3	0	0	0	0	0	0	15	3
Exeter City	2012–13	League Two	43	6	1	0	1	0	1 (Note: Appearance in Football League Trophy)	0	46	6
Exeter City	2013–14	League Two	45	6	1	0	1	0	1	0	48	6
Exeter City	2014–15	League Two	28	3	1	0	1	0	1	0	31	3
Exeter City	Total		132	18	3	0	3	0	3	0	141	18
Notts County	2015–16	League Two	6	0	—		1	0	0	0	7	0
Newport County (loan)	2015–16	League Two	12	0	3	1	—		—		15	1
York City (loan)	2015–16	League Two	11	0	—		—		—		11	0
Newport County	2016–17	League Two	39	0	4	0	1	0	3 (Note: Appearances in EFL Trophy)	1	47	1
Newport County	2017–18	League Two	28	2	4	0	1	0	3	0	36	2
Newport County	2018–19	League Two	38	2	5	0	2	0	5 (Note: Two appearances in EFL Trophy and three appearances in the League Two play-offs)	0	50	2
Newport County	2019–20	League Two	28	1	3	0	2	0	4	1	37	2
Newport County	2020–21	League Two	38	2	3	0	2	0	5	0	48	2
Newport County	2021–22	League Two	33	1	0	0	1	0	0	0	34	1
Newport County	2022–23	League Two	39	1	2	0	1	0	2	0	44	1
Newport County	2023–24	League Two	45	0	6	0	2	0	3	0	56	0
Newport County	Total		288	9	27	0	12	0	25	2	352	11
Cheltenham Town	2024–25	League Two	26	0	2	0	0	0	1	0	29	0
Cheltenham Town	2025–26	League Two	6	0	1	0	1	0	1	0	9	0
Cheltenham Town	Total		32	0	3	0	1	0	2	0	38	0
Weston-super-Mare (loan)	2025–26	National League South	18	0	—		—		2 (Note: Appearances in National League South play-offs)	0	20	0
Career total			499	27	36	1	17	0	32	2	584	30
