= George Friend =

English footballer (born 1987)

Personal information
- Full name: George Andrew Jordan Friend
- Date of birth: 17 October 1987 (age 39)
- Place of birth: Barnstaple, England
- Height: 6 ft 2 in (1.88 m)
- Positions: Left back; centre back

Youth career
- –2005: Exeter City

Senior career*
Years	Team	Apps	(Gls)
2005–2008	Exeter City	37	(1)
2008–2010	Wolverhampton Wanderers	7	(0)
2009	→ Millwall (loan)	6	(0)
2009	→ Southend United (loan)	6	(1)
2009	→ Scunthorpe United (loan)	4	(0)
2010	→ Exeter City (loan)	13	(1)
2010–2012	Doncaster Rovers	59	(1)
2012–2020	Middlesbrough	266	(9)
2020–2023	Birmingham City	46	(0)
2023–2024	Bristol Rovers	12	(0)
Total		456	(13)
- * Club domestic league appearances and goals

George Andrew Jordan Friend (born 17 October 1987) is an English former professional footballer who played as a defender.

In the 2012–13 season, Friend won Middlesbrough players' player of the season award. The following season, Friend won it again along with the Player of the Season award. Friend was named in the PFA Championship Team of the Year two years running, in the 2014–15 season, where he helped Middlesbrough reach the play-off final, and the 2015–16 season, where he was part of the Middlesbrough team that won promotion to the Premier League. After leaving Middlesbrough in 2020, he spent three years with Birmingham City.

== Career ==
=== Exeter City ===
Friend was born in Barnstaple, Devon. He began his career at then non-League Exeter City as a youth team player, signing a two-year professional contract in March 2006. Able to play left back, centre-back or left-sided midfield, he made his first-team debut on 17 April 2006 in a 0–0 draw at Forest Green Rovers.

His Exeter career took off in the 2007–08 season when he was integral to the side that won promotion to the Football League after defeating Cambridge United in the play-off final at Wembley Stadium. During that season he became the youngest ever captain in Exeter's history and scored his first goal for the club in a 4–4 draw with Burton Albion on 26 April 2008.

=== Wolverhampton Wanderers ===
After playing in Exeter's opening matches in the Football League, he moved to Wolverhampton Wanderers in the Championship on 1 September 2008, signing a two-year contract, with the option of a third year, for an initial fee of £350,000. He made six first team appearances for Wolves during the 2008–09 season as they were promoted to the Premier League as champions.

To gain regular playing time, he spent a month's loan at League One club Millwall during August to September 2009, before returning to Wolves. He soon went out on a month's loan again on 18 September to another League One club, Southend United, where he scored his first league goal with a free-kick against Southampton. After a proposed extension to his stay with Southend was cancelled due to the club's financial troubles, he instead spent six weeks on loan at Championship club Scunthorpe United.

Friend was recalled by Wolves as extra cover after injuries struck, giving him his first Premier League appearance on 15 December 2009 against Manchester United. His surprise involvement in the game was just one factor behind the club eventually receiving a £25,000 suspended fine for fielding an under-strength side. Friend did not feature again for Wolves before being loaned out once more, this time rejoining former club Exeter City for the rest of the season, during which time he helped them avoid an instant return to League Two.

=== Doncaster Rovers ===
At the end of the 2009–10 season it was announced that his deal at Wolves would not be extended, and Friend switched to Championship club Doncaster Rovers on a two-year contract despite being linked with a return move to Exeter City. Friend made his Doncaster debut in their 2–0 opening day win at Preston North End on 7 August 2010. On 11 September 2010, Friend scored his first goal in a 2–2 draw against Watford. The next game on 14 September 2010, Friend set up a goal for James Coppinger to score a second goal in a match with a 3–1 win over Norwich City. Following on from his debut, Friend established himself in the first team, playing at left-back. In a match with a 3–1 win over Scunthorpe United on 18 October 2011, Friend sustained an injury in early minutes and was substituted. After surgery, Friend was out for three months. On 25 January 2011, Friend made his return in a 2–0 loss against Burnley, coming on as a substitute in the early stages.

Friend was appointed captain at the beginning of 2011–12 following and won player of the year and supporters player of the year at the end of the season. Friend managed to regain his place in the starting eleven in the left back position but the club was relegated to League One after four seasons in the Championship.

=== Middlesbrough ===
On 23 July 2012, despite interest from Ipswich Town and Nottingham Forest, it was announced that Doncaster had agreed a fee with Middlesbrough for Friend. He signed for Middlesbrough on 30 July for an undisclosed fee, reported as £100,000. In August 2012, he made his debut in Capital One Cup against Bury.

After completing a successful season, in which Friend became a fans' favourite because of his consistent performances, he was awarded the Community Player of the Year after attending numerous off-field events, as well as winning the players' player of the year award. For the 2013–14 season, Friend was issued the number 3 squad number previously worn by departing defender André Bikey. Friend scored his first goal for Boro in a 2–2 draw at Wigan on 25 August. It was his first goal since 2010. Friend scored his second goal for Boro with a 20-yard strike in a 2–2 draw against Nottingham Forest on 17 September 2013.

Friend captained Middlesbrough for the first time in a 2–0 victory against Rotherham United on 11 April 2015.

=== Birmingham City ===
Friend rejected an offer to remain at Middlesbrough after his contract expired, and became available on a free transfer. On 15 August 2020, he signed a two-year deal with the option of a third with fellow Championship club Birmingham City, where the head coach was his former manager at Middlesbrough, Aitor Karanka. Over the three years he spent with Birmingham, he made 52 appearances in all competitions. He was one of six senior professionals released at the end of the 2022–23 season.

=== Bristol Rovers ===
On 4 July 2023, Friend signed for League One club Bristol Rovers on a one-year deal following a successful trial period with the club. He had previously played for the club twenty-six years prior, at Under-9s level, alongside new teammate Scott Sinclair.

== Post-playing career ==
On 28 February 2024, Friend announced his retirement from football with immediate effect, remaining with Bristol Rovers to take on the role of Director of Football. On 31 March 2025, the club announced that Friend would be departing his role at the end of the 2024–25 season.

== Career statistics ==
As of match played 10 February 2024

Appearances and goals by club, season and competition
Club	Season	League			FA Cup		League Cup		Other		Total	
Club	Season	Division	Apps	Goals	Apps	Goals	Apps	Goals	Apps	Goals	Apps	Goals
Exeter City	2005–06	Conference National	1	0	0	0	—		0	0	1	0
Exeter City	2006–07	Conference National	2	0	0	0	—		0	0	2	0
Exeter City	2007–08	Conference Premier	30	1	2	0	0	0	5 (Note: One appearance in Conference League Cup, one in FA Trophy, three in Conference Premier play-offs)	0	37	1
Exeter City	2008–09	League Two	4	0	—		1	0	—		5	0
Exeter City	Total		37	1	2	0	1	0	5	0	45	1
Wolverhampton Wanderers	2008–09	Championship	6	0	1	0	—		—		7	0
Wolverhampton Wanderers	2009–10	Premier League	1	0	0	0	—		—		1	0
Wolverhampton Wanderers	Total		7	0	1	0	—		—		8	0
Millwall (loan)	2009–10	League One	6	0	—		—		1 (Note: Appearance in Football League Trophy)	0	7	0
Southend United (loan)	2009–10	League One	6	1	—		—		—		6	1
Scunthorpe United (loan)	2009–10	Championship	4	0	—		—		—		4	0
Exeter City (loan)	2009–10	League One	13	1	—		—		—		13	1
Doncaster Rovers	2010–11	Championship	32	1	2	0	1	0	—		35	1
Doncaster Rovers	2011–12	Championship	27	0	0	0	2	0	—		29	0
Doncaster Rovers	Total		59	1	2	0	3	0	—		64	1
Middlesbrough	2012–13	Championship	34	0	1	0	4	0	—		39	0
Middlesbrough	2013–14	Championship	41	3	1	0	1	0	—		43	3
Middlesbrough	2014–15	Championship	42	1	2	0	1	0	3 (Note: Appearances in Championship play-offs)	0	48	1
Middlesbrough	2015–16	Championship	40	1	1	0	4	0	—		45	1
Middlesbrough	2016–17	Premier League	24	0	2	0	1	0	—		27	0
Middlesbrough	2017–18	Championship	33	2	2	0	2	0	2	0	39	2
Middlesbrough	2018–19	Championship	38	2	3	1	2	0	—		43	3
Middlesbrough	2019–20	Championship	14	0	0	0	1	0	—		15	0
Middlesbrough	Total		266	9	12	1	16	0	5	0	299	10
Birmingham City	2020–21	Championship	26	0	1	0	1	0	—		28	0
Birmingham City	2021–22	Championship	14	0	1	0	2	0	—		17	0
Birmingham City	2022–23	Championship	6	0	1	0	0	0	—		7	0
Birmingham City	Total		46	0	3	0	3	0	—		52	0
Bristol Rovers	2023–24	League One	12	0	0	0	0	0	0	0	12	0
Career total			456	13	20	1	23	0	11	0	510	14

== Honours ==
Exeter City

- Conference Premier play-offs: 2008

Middlesbrough

- Football League Championship runner-up: 2015–16

Individual

- PFA Team of the Year: 2014–15 Championship, 2015–16 Championship
- Football League Team of the Season: 2015–16
- Doncaster Rovers Player of the Year: 2011–12
