= Ryan Harley =

English footballer & coach (born 1985)

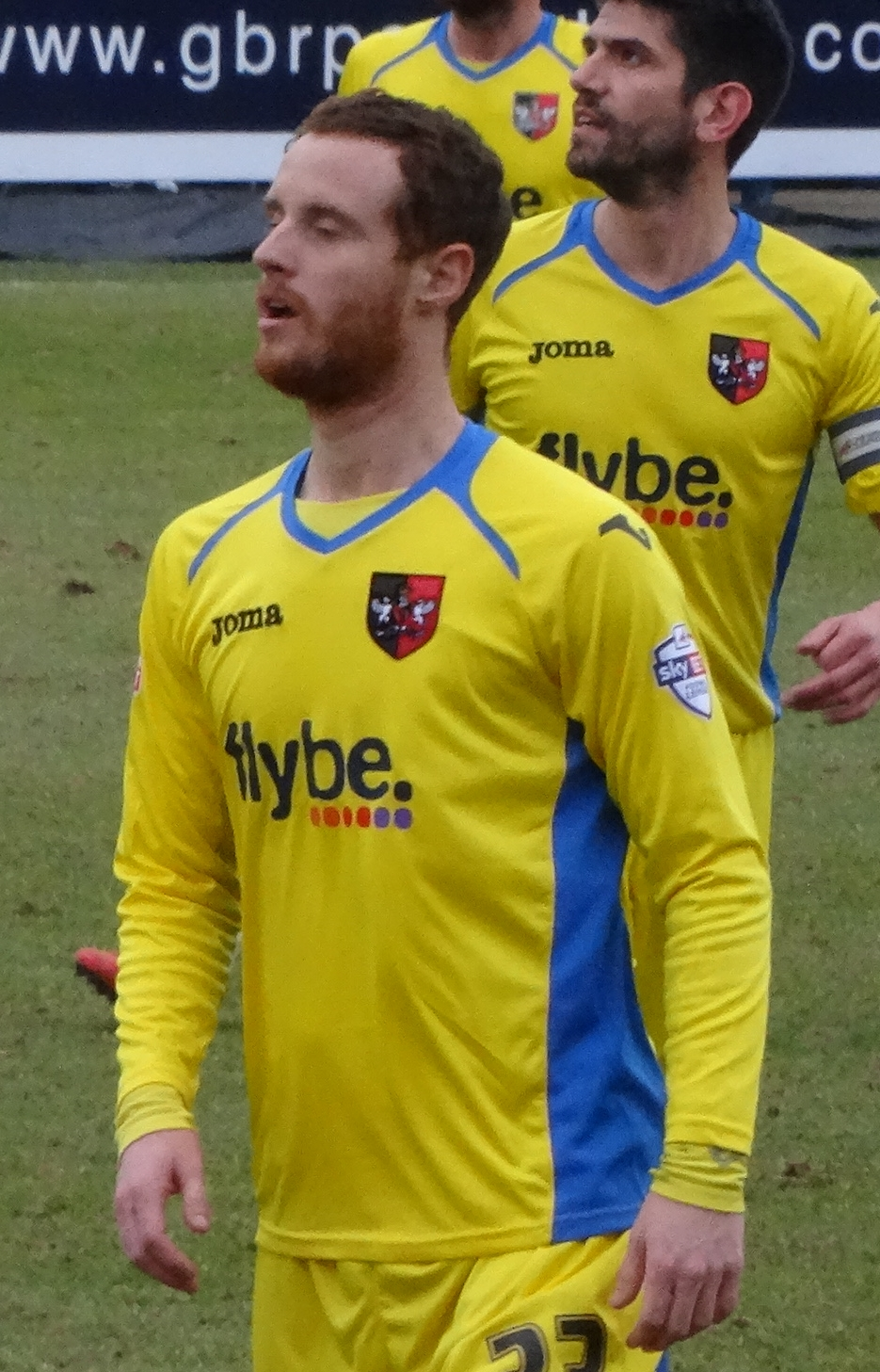
- Harley playing for Exeter City in 2015

Personal information
- Full name: Ryan Bernard Harley
- Date of birth: 22 January 1985 (age 41)
- Place of birth: Bristol, England
- Position: Midfielder

Youth career
- Bristol City

Senior career*
Years	Team	Apps	(Gls)
2003–2006	Bristol City	2	(0)
2005	→ Forest Green Rovers (loan)	3	(0)
2006–2007	Weston-super-Mare	26	(6)
2007–2011	Exeter City	108	(21)
2011	Swansea City	0	(0)
2011	→ Exeter City (loan)	21	(4)
2011–2013	Brighton & Hove Albion	18	(2)
2013	→ Milton Keynes Dons (loan)	8	(0)
2013–2015	Swindon Town	21	(1)
2014–2015	→ Exeter City (loan)	7	(0)
2015–2018	Exeter City	96	(14)
2018–2020	Milton Keynes Dons	17	(2)
2020–2021	Bath City	12	(0)
2021–2022	Frome Town	6	(0)
Total		345	(50)

Managerial career
- 2026: Peterborough United (caretaker)
- * Club domestic league appearances and goals

Ryan Bernard Harley (born 22 January 1985) is an English former professional footballer.

His previous clubs include Bristol City, Brighton & Hove Albion, Swansea City, Exeter City and Milton Keynes Dons.

== Career ==
=== Bristol City ===
Born in Bristol, Harley began his career with hometown club Bristol City. On 28 August 2004, Harley made his professional debut in a 3–0 loss against Port Vale at Vale Park in League One.

During the 2005–06 season, Harley was loaned to then Conference National side Forest Green Rovers. He made only 3 appearances for Rovers before returning to Bristol City.

=== Weston-super-Mare ===
In October 2006, Harley signed for Conference South side Weston-super-Mare. Harley went on to score six times in 26 appearances for the club.

=== Exeter City ===
In November 2007, Harley signed for Conference side Exeter City. He made his debut for the Grecians on 4 March 2008, coming on as a substitute for Andrew Taylor in a 2–2 draw against Crawley Town.

Harley's goal in the second leg of Exeter's play-off semi-final sparked a memorable comeback against rivals Torquay United. The victory took the Grecians to the play-off final at Wembley where they were promoted back to the Football League.

On 16 January 2010, Harley scored both goals against Leeds United in a 2–0 victory at St. James Park.

Harley scored the vital goal in the final game of the 2009–10 season against Huddersfield Town. The victory ensured Exeter's position in League One for the forthcoming season.

=== Swansea City ===
On 21 January 2011, Harley signed for the then Championship side Swansea City on a free transfer. He was loaned back to Exeter for the remainder of the 2010–11 season. In spite of the move, Harley would not make an appearance for the Swans.

Swansea beat Reading in the Championship play-off final on 30 May 2011 to progress to the Premier League.

=== Brighton & Hove Albion ===
On 22 August 2011, Harley joined Championship side Brighton & Hove Albion on a 3-year deal for an undisclosed fee.

Harley made his debut at home in a 1–0 victory against Sunderland in the League Cup. He made his league debut against Peterborough United, scoring the second goal in a 2–0 win with a spectacular 30-yard free-kick.

In December 2012, Harley joined League One side MK Dons on loan for the remainder of the 2012–13 season. He made 11 appearances and scored 1 goal for the Dons.

=== Swindon Town ===
Harley completed a free transfer to League One side Swindon Town on 26 July 2013 after his contract at Brighton was terminated. He made 25 appearances and scored 4 goals during the 2013–14 season for the Robins.

=== Return to Exeter City ===
On 20 November 2014 Harley was loaned to his former club Exeter City until January. He had previously trained with the club during the season. On 12 January 2015 Exeter signed Harley to an 18-month deal after his contract was cancelled by Swindon.

=== Milton Keynes Dons ===
On 9 July 2018, Harley joined previous loan club and newly relegated League Two side Milton Keynes Dons, and scored on his league debut for the club on 4 August 2018 in a 1–2 away win over Oldham Athletic. He enjoyed promotion back to League One with the club at the conclusion of the 2018–19 season. Following the departure of manager Paul Tisdale early in the 2019–20, Harley took up more of a coaching role with the club and his appearances for the first team were limited. At the end of the season, Harley was one of nine players released.

== Coaching career ==
In June 2022, Harley was appointed assistant head coach of National League club Notts County, assisting Luke Williams whom he had previously worked with at Milton Keynes Dons. The 2022–23 season brought success for Williams and Harley as they guided County to promotion through the play-offs having finished the regulation season in second place, despite having accumulated 107 points.

On 5 January 2024, Harley followed Williams to his former club Swansea City, again in the role of assistant head coach.

On 29 October 2025, Harley again followed Williams to become assistant manager of EFL League One side Peterborough United. On 19 September 2026, Harley was appointed caretaker manager following Williams' sacking. He departed the club in October 2026 following the appointment of Robbie Savage as new first-team manager.

== Career statistics ==
Appearances and goals by club, season and competition
Club	Season	League			FA Cup		League Cup		Other		Total	
Club	Season	Division	Apps	Goals	Apps	Goals	Apps	Goals	Apps	Goals	Apps	Goals
Bristol City	2004–05	League One	2	0	0	0	0	0	1 (Note: Appearance(s) in Football League Trophy)	0	3	0
Bristol City	2005–06	League One	0	0	0	0	0	0	0	0	0	0
Bristol City	Total		2	0	0	0	0	0	1	0	3	0
Forest Green Rovers (loan)	2005–06	Conference Premier	3	0	0	0	—		—		3	0
Weston-super-Mare	2006–07	Conference South	26	6	—		—		—		26	6
Exeter City	2007–08	Conference Premier	12	1	0	0	—		3 (Note: Appearances in Conference Premier play-offs)	1	15	2
Exeter City	2008–09	League Two	31	4	1	0	1	0	1	1	34	5
Exeter City	2009–10	League One	44	10	2	0	1	0	0	0	47	10
Exeter City	2010–11	League One	21	6	1	0	1	2	3	3	25	11
Exeter City	Total		108	21	4	0	3	2	7	5	122	28
Swansea City	2010–11	Championship	0	0	—		—		—		0	0
Exeter City (loan)	2010–11	League One	21	4	0	0	0	0	1	0	22	4
Brighton & Hove Albion	2011–12	Championship	16	2	1	0	1	0	—		18	2
Brighton & Hove Albion	2012–13	Championship	2	0	0	0	1	0	0	0	3	0
Brighton & Hove Albion	Total		18	2	1	0	2	0	0	0	21	2
Milton Keynes Dons (loan)	2012–13	League One	8	0	3	1	0	0	0	0	11	1
Swindon Town	2013–14	League One	21	1	1	0	1	0	2	0	25	1
Swindon Town	2014–15	League One	0	0	0	0	0	0	0	0	0	0
Swindon Town	Total		21	1	1	0	1	0	2	0	25	1
Exeter City (loan)	2014–15	League Two	7	0	0	0	0	0	0	0	7	0
Exeter City	2014–15	League Two	18	4	0	0	0	0	0	0	18	4
Exeter City	2015–16	League Two	28	4	1	0	1	0	2	1	32	5
Exeter City	2016–17	League Two	31	5	0	0	2	1	3 (Note: Appearances in League Two play-offs)	1	36	7
Exeter City	2017–18	League Two	19	1	3	0	0	0	4 (Note: One appearance in EFL Trophy, three appearances in League Two play-offs)	1	26	2
Exeter City	Total		96	14	4	0	3	1	9	3	112	18
Milton Keynes Dons	2018–19	League Two	14	2	0	0	0	0	0	0	14	2
Milton Keynes Dons	2019–20	League One	3	0	0	0	1	0	0	0	4	0
Milton Keynes Dons	Total		17	2	0	0	1	0	0	0	18	2
Bath City	2020–21	National League South	9	0	3	0	—		3 (Note: Appearances in FA Trophy)	0	15	0
Bath City	2021–22	National League South	3	0	0	0	—		0	0	3	0
Bath City	Total		12	0	3	0	—		3	0	18	0
Frome Town	2021–22	Southern League; Division One South	6	0	—		—		1 (Note: Appearance in Somerset Premier Cup)	0	7	0
Career total			345	50	16	1	10	3	24	8	395	62

== Honours ==
Exeter City

- Conference Premier play-offs: 2008
- Football League Two runner-up: 2008–09

Milton Keynes Dons

- EFL League Two third-place promotion: 2018–19
