= Dean Moxey =

English footballer (born 1986)

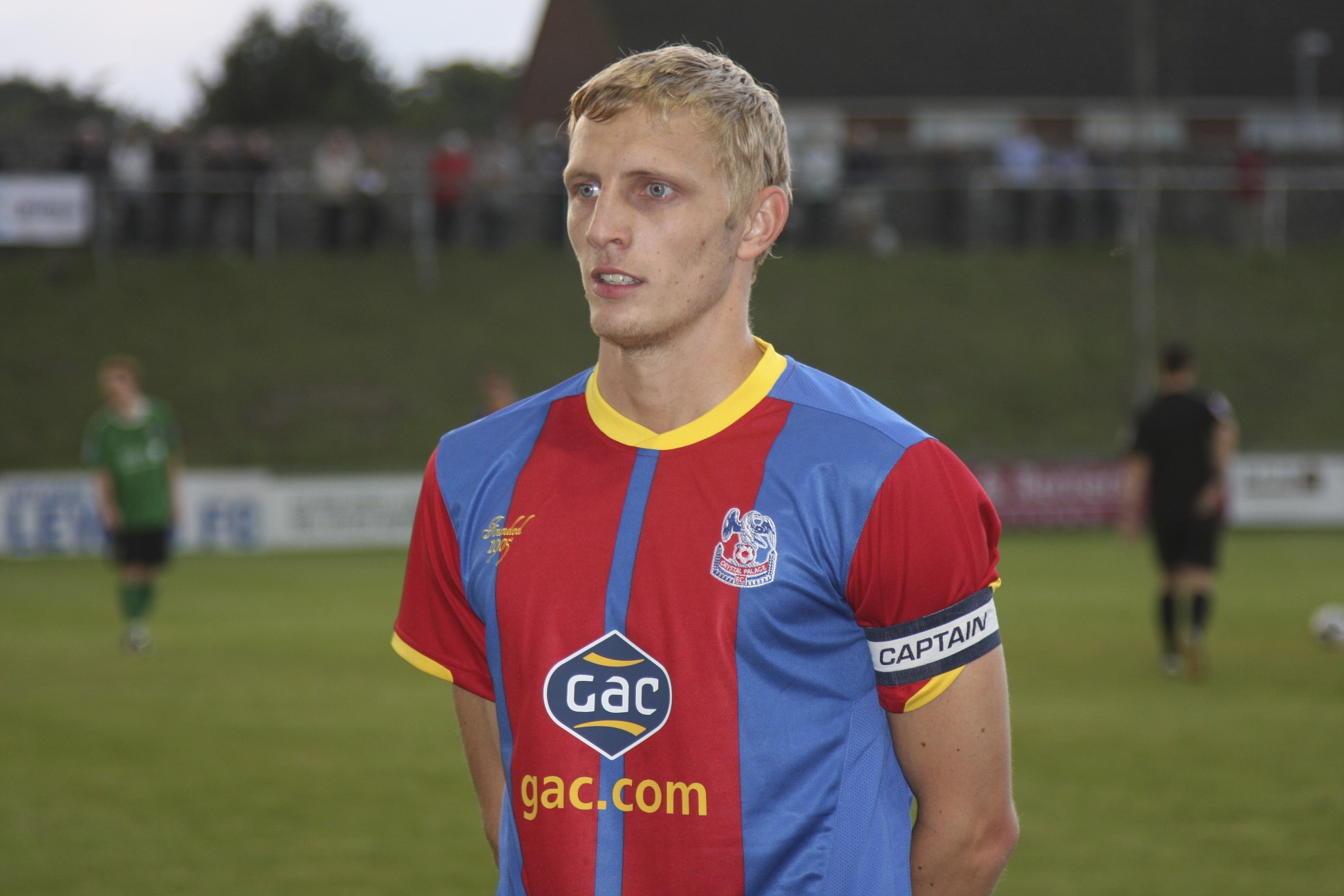
- Moxey in 2012

Personal information
- Full name: Dean William Moxey
- Date of birth: 14 January 1986 (age 40)
- Place of birth: Exeter, England
- Height: 1.80 m (5 ft 11 in)
- Position: Defender

Team information
- Current team: Tiverton Town

Youth career
- –2003: Exeter City

Senior career*
Years	Team	Apps	(Gls)
2003–2009	Exeter City	176	(21)
2009–2011	Derby County	52	(2)
2011–2014	Crystal Palace	91	(1)
2014–2017	Bolton Wanderers	72	(1)
2017–2020	Exeter City	96	(8)
2020–2025	Torquay United	146	(3)
2025–	Tiverton Town	4	(0)

International career
2008	England C	4	(0)
- * Club domestic league appearances and goals as of 20:21, 25 December 2025 (UTC)

Dean William Moxey (born 14 January 1986) is an English professional footballer who plays as a defender for Southern League Premier South club Tiverton Town.

Moxey is a versatile player primarily utilized as a left-back. He is also capable of performing in several other positions, including centre-back, left winger, left wing-back, and left-sided striker. He is a product of the Exeter City academy and has previously played for Derby County, Crystal Palace and Bolton Wanderers.

== Career ==
=== Exeter City ===
Upon their relegation from the Football League in 2003, many senior players departed, giving Moxey and other trainees their share of first-team action. Moxey was considered one of the best youth players to emerge during this period. He made his debut on 18 October 2003 against Conference side Accrington Stanley and quickly established himself as a first team regular.

Moxey started to achieve recognition with his part in Exeter's 2005 FA Cup run. It was Moxey's stunning 50-yard goal against Football League One side Doncaster Rovers that had helped City into the third round and led to Moxey being voted Player of the Round. He won attention for his quip when interviewed post-match for Match of the Day: "Went for it, seen him [the Doncaster goalkeeper] off his line, dropped in, happy as Larry!". He was part of the side that, on 8 January 2005, drew 0–0 against Manchester United at Old Trafford in the Third Round to earn a replay at St. James Park.

In the 2007–08 season, Moxey turned in a man of the match performance at Wembley in the 2008 Conference Premier play-off final to help Exeter City win promotion through the play-offs back to the Football League. At the age of just 22, that Wembley appearance was Moxey's 150th for his home-town club. Upon their return to League football, Moxey played 43 times, scoring 4 goals, as he was instrumental in Exeter's promotion to League One in the following season.

=== Derby County ===
Exeter confirmed on 19 May 2009 that they had received an offer – believed to be around £200,000 – for Moxey from Derby County which they rejected, though they did give an indication of a more acceptable transfer fee. An improved offer, believed to be around £300,000, was accepted on 8 June 2009. Moxey joined Derby on a three-year contract on 26 June 2009, and was given the number 21 shirt. He made his first appearance in the 2–1 win over Peterborough United in which he was voted man of the match by the Derby County supporters. Moxey spent the majority of his first season at Derby battling with Jay McEveley to be the club's first-choice left back and eventually finished the season with 31 starts from the clubs 51-game programme.

The release of McEveley from his contract at the end of the 2009–10 season saw Moxey as Derby's only natural leftback, though this was changed with the arrival of Gareth Roberts from Doncaster Rovers ahead of the 2010–11 campaign. Roberts started the season at leftback, leaving Moxey on the bench, though Moxey made a surprise return to the first team as an emergency forward after injuries ruled out all of Derby's strikeforce. Moxey made his first start as a striker and scored his first goal for Derby in a 2–1 defeat to Coventry City, dedicating the goal to his former Exeter teammate Adam Stansfield, who died earlier in the month.

After two games as a striker, injury to Roberts saw Moxey return to his natural defensive position and, after a shaky start where he was at fault for winning goals in defeats to Sheffield United and Hull City, Moxey, and Derby, recovered their form to go on a four match unbeaten run in which they conceded only twice. Moxey impressed, with manager Nigel Clough suggesting that Roberts would not return straight into the side when he recovered, adding "Dean has played much better in the last four games. At Swansea, Dean was up against as tricky and as quick a winger as he will face in Nathan Dyer and he handled it very well".

When Roberts was again available for selection, Moxey retained his place in the Derby side and rewarded Clough's faith with the opening goal, a cross which a helpless Andy Lonergan palmed into his own goal, in a 3–0 victory over Preston North End. Moxey's fine form continued as Derby stretched their form to just 1 defeat in 8, the best in the division, with a 2–0 win over Portsmouth which took Derby to fourth in the table and saw Moxey earn his first Championship Team of the Week award. In the January 2011 transfer window, Moxey was the subject of a £400,000 bid from Crystal Palace, which was accepted by Derby, leaving them with only one recognised left back.

=== Crystal Palace ===
Moxey joined Crystal Palace for an undisclosed fee on 31 January 2011, and was given the number 29 shirt. He made his debut in the 1–0 home victory against Middlesbrough on 5 February. Within a couple of months of his arrival, Moxey established himself as a fan's favourite amongst the Palace faithful because of his attacking runs down the left wing and his solid defensive play. On 19 March 2011, Moxey scored his first, and only, goal for Palace with a 21st minute drive to level the scores at 1–1 against former club Derby in a game that ended 2–2.

At the start of the 2011–12 season, Moxey was ineligible for three games due to a red card in the previous season. Moxey returned and had stints at left-back and on the wing throughout the season. He also played a part of the team that reached the League Cup Semi-final and won promotion to the Premier League in the 2012–13 season via the play-offs. He was released by Palace at the end of the 2013–14 season.

=== Bolton Wanderers ===
He reunited with his former Palace manager Dougie Freedman at Bolton Wanderers on 2 July 2014, signing a three-year contract with the Wanderers. He scored his first goal for the club on 21 October 2014 in a 2–1 loss at Charlton Athletic. On 19 May 2017, the club confirmed that Moxey would be leaving when his contract expired on 30 June.

=== Exeter City ===
On 27 June 2017, Moxey signed a three-year contract with his former club. He made his second debut for the club against Barnet FC, coming off the bench in the 95th minute for Rueben Reid in a 2–1 win for Exeter. He became a key part of Exeter's side, playing at left back, centre back and left midfield, playing 42 games in total. He started in the 2018 League Two play-off final at Wembley for Exeter, which they lost 3–1 to Coventry City. In the 2018–19 season, Moxey was promoted to vice-captain of Exeter after Jayden Stockley's departure. He made 39 more appearances that season, primarily playing at centre-back under new manager Matt Taylor. Moxey made his 300th appearance for the club on 21 December 2019, in a 3–3 draw against Walsall. He was released by Exeter at the end of his contract in July 2020. His final appearance was in the 2020 League Two play-off final defeat to Northampton Town at Wembley.

=== Torquay United ===
Moxey signed with National League side Torquay United on 1 September 2020. Moxey played in the play-off final defeat to Hartlepool United in 2021. He was named as the club's Player of the Season for the 2023–24 season. Moxey agreed a new one-year contract with 'The Gulls' on June 28, 2024.

=== Tiverton Town ===
In 2025, Moxey joined Tiverton Town, playing in the Southern League Premier Division South.

== Career statistics ==
As of match played 29 April 2023

Appearances and goals by club, season and competition
Club	Season	League			FA Cup		League Cup		Other		Total	
Club	Season	Division	Apps	Goals	Apps	Goals	Apps	Goals	Apps	Goals	Apps	Goals
Exeter City	2003–04	Conference	15	2	0	0	—		2 (Note: One appearance in Football League Trophy, one in FA Trophy)	0	17	2
Exeter City	2004–05	Conference National	29	3	4	1	—		2 (Note: One appearance in Football League Trophy, one in FA Trophy)	0	35	4
Exeter City	2004–05	Conference National	21	1	0	0	—		1 (Note: Appearance(s) in FA Trophy)	0	22	1
Exeter City	2006–07	Conference National	23	2	0	0	—		1	0	24	2
Exeter City	2007–08	Conference Premier	45	9	2	0	—		5 (Note: Two appearances in Football League Trophy, three in the Conference play-offs)	0	52	9
Exeter City	2008–09	League Two	43	4	1	1	1	1	1 (Note: Appearance(s) in Football League Trophy)	0	46	6
Exeter City	Total		176	21	7	2	1	1	12	0	196	24
Derby County	2009–10	Championship	30	0	3	0	1	0	0	0	34	0
Derby County	2010–11	Championship	22	2	1	0	1	0	0	0	24	2
Derby County	Total		52	2	4	0	2	0	0	0	58	2
Crystal Palace	2010–11	Championship	17	1	0	0	0	0	0	0	17	1
Crystal Palace	2011–12	Championship	24	0	0	0	5	0	0	0	29	0
Crystal Palace	2012–13	Championship	30	0	1	0	2	0	3 (Note: Three appearances in Championship play-offs)	0	36	0
Crystal Palace	2013–14	Premier League	20	0	1	0	0	0	0	0	21	0
Crystal Palace	Total		91	1	2	0	7	0	3	0	103	1
Bolton Wanderers	2014–15	Championship	20	1	2	0	1	0	0	0	23	1
Bolton Wanderers	2015–16	Championship	33	0	3	1	1	0	0	0	37	1
Bolton Wanderers	2016–17	League One	19	0	1	0	1	0	1 (Note: Appearance in EFL Trophy)	0	22	0
Bolton Wanderers	Total		72	1	6	1	3	0	1	0	82	2
Exeter City	2017–18	League Two	34	3	4	0	0	0	4 (Note: One appearance in EFL Trophy, three appearances in League Two play-offs)	0	42	3
Exeter City	2018–19	League Two	38	3	0	0	0	0	1	0	39	3
Exeter City	2019–20	League Two	24	2	2	0	1	0	5 (Note: Two appearances in EFL Trophy, three appearances in League Two play-offs)	0	32	2
Exeter City	Total		96	8	6	0	1	0	10	0	113	8
Torquay United	2020–21	National League	24	0	1	0	—		1 (Note: Appearance in National League play-offs)	1	26	1
Torquay United	2021–22	National League	37	1	0	0	—		0	0	37	1
Torquay United	2022–23	National League	37	0	1	0	—		1	0	39	0
Torquay United	Total		98	1	2	0	0	0	2	1	102	2
Career total			585	34	27	3	14	1	28	1	654	39

== Honours ==
Exeter City

- Football League Two second-place promotion: 2008–09
- Football Conference play-offs: 2008

Crystal Palace

- Football League Championship play-offs: 2013

Bolton Wanderers

- EFL League One second-place promotion: 2016–17

Individual

- Torquay United Player of the Season: 2023–24
