= Jack Obersteller =

English footballer

Personal information
- Full name: Jack Lewis Obersteller
- Date of birth: 10 October 1988 (age 38)
- Place of birth: Newham, England
- Height: 6 ft 2 in (1.88 m)
- Positions: Left back; left midfielder

Team information
- Current team: Welling United

Youth career
- ?–2007: Millwall

Senior career*
Years	Team	Apps	(Gls)
2007	Crawley Town	1	(0)
2007–2008	Wycombe Wanderers	0	(0)
2007–2008	→ Grays Athletic (loan)	12	(1)
2008–2009	Exeter City	7	(0)
2009	Grays Athletic	4	(1)
2009–	Welling United	120	(3)
- * Club domestic league appearances and goals as of 15:55, 26 November 2009 (UTC)

Jack Lewis Obersteller (born 10 October 1988) is a footballer who plays for Welling United.

== Career ==
Obersteller started his career as a trainee at Millwall, however he failed to make an appearance and moved on to Crawley Town before signing for Wycombe Wanderers, where he was loaned out to Grays Athletic.

He signed a one-year contract with newly promoted Exeter City in the summer of 2008.

Obersteller rejoined Grays Athletic on 28 August.

Obersteller was then released by Grays in September 2009, and joined Welling United in November 2010. He was voted players' player of the season and came second in the fans player of the season vote at the end of 2010–11.
