= Neil Saunders =

English footballer

Personal information
- Full name: Neil Christopher Saunders
- Date of birth: 7 May 1983 (age 43)
- Place of birth: Dagenham, England
- Position: Midfielder

Youth career
- 1992–2002: Watford

Senior career*
Years	Team	Apps	(Gls)
2002–2003	Watford	0	(0)
2003–2004	Barnet	1	(0)
2003–2007	Team Bath	48	(13)
2007–2010	Exeter City	23	(3)
Total		72	(16)
- * Club domestic league appearances and goals

Neil Christopher Saunders (born 7 May 1983) is a former professional footballer who played as a midfielder. He last played for Exeter City in League One, before retiring due to injury in 2010.

He has played international futsal for England.

== Career ==
Saunders was born in Dagenham, east London. He was a member of Watford's youth academy for ten years before being offered professional terms by manager Gianluca Vialli. Despite playing regularly for the reserves, Saunders failed to make a first-team appearance for the club, and joined Conference National club Barnet on a free transfer in August 2003. He played only once for Barnet's first team.

He played for Team Bath while studying for a BA degree in Coach Education and Sports Development at the University of Bath. He contributed to their promotion to the Premier Division of the Southern League in the 2003–04 season. Appointed club captain for the 2005–06 season, he missed most of the campaign with a knee injury. At the end of the 2006–07 season he received the manager's Player of the Year award, having led the team to runners-up spot in the Premier Division, missing out on promotion to the Conference South after losing to Maidenhead United in the play-off final, and the tema's first victory in the Somerset Premier Cup.

He turned professional with Exeter City before the 2007–08 season, together with Matt Taylor, rejoining their former Team Bath coach Paul Tisdale. However, Saunders was injured before the start of the season and it was not until 15 months later, in December 2008, that he finally made his debut for Exeter, during a home game against Lincoln City. He scored his first goal in professional football with a 35-yard volley during Exeter's League Two match against Barnet in January 2009.

It was announced on 14 May 2010, that he had been released by Exeter, along with eight other players.

Saunders made his debut for England at futsal in December 2004.

On 29 June 2010 Saunders announced he was to retire from professional football at the age of 27 due to his ongoing knee injury preventing him from fulfilling his potential in the game.
