= Ben Watson (footballer, born December 1985) =

English footballer

Personal information
- Full name: Ben Charles Watson
- Date of birth: 6 December 1985 (age 40)
- Place of birth: Shoreham-by-Sea, England
- Height: 5 ft 8 in (1.73 m)
- Position: Striker

Team information
- Current team: Willand Rovers FC

Youth career
- Brighton & Hove Albion

Senior career*
Years	Team	Apps	(Gls)
2001–2004	Brighton & Hove Albion	0	(0)
2004	→ Bognor Regis Town (loan)	20	(10)
2004–2007	Bognor Regis Town	90	(64)
2007–2008	Grays Athletic	24	(5)
2008	→ Exeter City (loan)	12	(2)
2008–2011	Exeter City	13	(2)
2009	→ Forest Green Rovers (loan)	0	(0)
2010	→ Forest Green Rovers (loan)	7	(1)
2011	→ Bath City (loan)	7	(1)
2011–2012	Eastbourne Borough	25	(11)
2012–2013	Dorchester Town	27	(11)
2013–2014	Truro City	10	(5)
2014–2015	Bideford	10	(5)
2015–2016	Dorchester Town	21	(6)
2016–2017	Bideford	2	(0)
2018–	St Martins	15	(11)

International career^{‡}
- England futsal
- England C
- * Club domestic league appearances and goals as of 16:34, 28 October 2015 (UTC) ‡ National team caps and goals as of 22:16, 6 March 2013 (UTC)

Ben Charles Watson (born 6 December 1985) is an English footballer, who is manager for Crediton United FC .

He is also currently a coach at League 2 side Exeter City's community trust and holds his B-License coaching qualification. The striker started his career with Brighton before a few loan moves before signing for Bognor Regis permanently in 2004. He later moved onto Grays Athletic where he impressed and earned a move to then Conference side Exeter City after catching the eye of manager Paul Tisdale. Watson is currently on his second spell at Bideford following a recent second spell with Dorchester. Watson is perhaps best known for his time at League Two side Exeter where he won promotion twice, first time through the conference playoffs (where he wore the number 32) and played at Wembley, and the second was an automatic promotion to league one the following season (where he wore the #19 shirt). He had two short loan spells with Forest Green and a third with Bath City before being released by Exeter due to a constant calf injury across 2 seasons and joining Eastbourne Borough. Watson has recently signed for Bideford for a second spell following time at Dorchester (two spells) and Truro City.

== Career ==
Born in Shoreham-by-Sea, Watson has also played for Exeter City, Bognor Regis Town and Grays Athletic. He holds UEFA 'B' coaching badges for both football and futsal. With this he spent some of his time whilst at Bognor Regis coaching at Varndean School in Brighton. He then moved on to Grays Athletic.

Watson made his debut for Exeter City on 24 March 2008 in the 3–1 away defeat at Weymouth, while on loan from Grays Athletic. Following Exeter's promotion to the Football League, Watson signed a one-year contract with the club. He made his debut as an Exeter signee, at home to Shrewsbury Town, in the 2–1 defeat in the Football League Trophy on 2 September 2008. On the last day of that year, he extended his contract to tie him to the club until the end of the 2009–10 season. Watson joined Forest Green Rovers on loan for a month on 31 December 2009. The loan was terminated just a couple of days after however as Watson suffered a calf injury before the move.

Forest Green signed Watson on loan again the next season in September 2010. He made his debut the next day in a 3–0 away loss against Barrow.

He returned to Exeter City in October when his loan spell with Forest Green Rovers expired.

In May 2011 Exeter announced that he would not be offered a new deal at the end of the season.

Watson signed for Eastbourne Borough on 21 June 2011. A year later, he signed for Conference South Dorchester Town. He ended the 2012–13 season as Dorchester's top goal scorer with 17 goals in all competitions and signed a two-year contract in June 2013.

With Dorchester experiencing financial problems, Watson and teammate Arran Pugh joined Pugh's old club Truro City in the Southern Premier League on 4 October 2013. Watson scored twice on his debut the following day as Truro lost 7–3 at home to St Albans City. He won Truro City's 'Golden Boot' award for 2013–14 with 13 goals in all competitions, but after a poor start to the following season he was placed on the transfer list by manager Steve Tully. He was later brought to Bideford by general manager Steve Massey, formerly manager at Truro City. He joined South West Peninsula League club St Martins in February 2018.
