= Richard Logan (footballer, born 1982) =

English footballer (born 1982)

Personal information
- Full name: Richard James Logan
- Date of birth: 4 January 1982 (age 44)
- Place of birth: Bury St. Edmunds, England
- Position: Striker

Youth career
- Ipswich Town

Senior career*
Years	Team	Apps	(Gls)
1998–2003	Ipswich Town	3	(0)
2001	→ Cambridge United (loan)	5	(1)
2001–2002	→ Torquay United (loan)	16	(4)
2002–2003	→ Boston United (loan)	8	(6)
2003	Boston United	27	(4)
2003	→ Peterborough United (loan)	11	(1)
2003–2006	Peterborough United	72	(13)
2004	→ Shrewsbury Town (loan)	5	(1)
2005–2006	→ Lincoln City (loan)	8	(2)
2006–2007	Weymouth	23	(5)
2007–2012	Exeter City	193	(47)
2012	Wycombe Wanderers	8	(0)
2012–2013	Dorchester Town	4	(0)
Total		383	(84)

International career
- England u15, England u20
- * Club domestic league appearances and goals

Richard James Logan (born 4 January 1982) is an English former footballer.

== Career ==
Logan, a striker, began his career as a trainee with Championship side Ipswich Town. Despite turning professional in August 1998, he never managed to establish himself as a first team member with the Blues, making only five appearances as a substitute in over four years with the club. While at Portman Road, Logan had loan spells with then League One side Cambridge United where he made five appearances and scored one goal against Wycombe Wanderers, League Two side Torquay United where he made 16 appearances, scoring four goals and League Two side Boston United where he scored six goals in eight matches.

On 20 January 2003 after making eight appearances on loan with Boston, he was acquired by The Pilgrims on a free from Ipswich. Logan finished the 2002–03 season with Boston, making a further 19 appearances in which he scored four times. Logan began the 2003–04 season with Boston before moving on loan to League One side Peterborough after nine matches. Logan made 15 appearances on loan for The Posh before signing with them on a free on 18 December 2003.

Logan scored five times in 19 appearances for Peterborough during the remainder of the 2003–04 season. Logan began the 2004–05 season at London Road but made only two appearances before moving on loan to League Two side Shrewsbury Town. Logan scored twice in six matches for The Shrews; his first goal came on his debut against Boston United in the league and his second came in a Football League Trophy tie against AFC Bournemouth. He then returned to Peterborough for the remainder of the season. Logan made 13 appearances for The Posh at the beginning of the 2005–06 season before moving on loan to League Two side Lincoln City. Logan scored twice in eight appearances for The Imps, before moving back to Peterborough for the remainder of the 2005–06 season. In over three years with Peterborough, Logan scored 15 times in 78 appearances before moving to newly promoted Conference National side Weymouth for the beginning of the 2006–07 season.

Logan scored five times in 26 appearances for Weymouth before the entire first team was transfer listed on 10 January 2007 after the club decided to cut their financial costs.

On 31 January 2007, Logan was picked up on a free by neighbouring Conference side Exeter City. In the 2007–08 season, Logan was the top scorer for Exeter, scoring 18 league goals, including what proved to be the all-important goal away to Torquay United, in the play-off semi-final second leg. This is the goal that effectively sealed their passage to Wembley for the second year running where they would go on to beat Cambridge United in front of over 45,000 fans. He also scored the goal on the last day of the 2008–09 season in the 1–0 away victory at Rotherham United that sent Exeter City into League One for the 2009–10 season.

Logan signed a new one-year contract with Exeter City in May 2010. In May 2012, Logan was released by Exeter after the club was relegated from League One.

On 3 July 2012, Logan signed for League Two side Wycombe Wanderers on a one-year deal.

On 16 November 2012, Logan was released by Wycombe Wanderers and joined Dorchester Town on 19 November 2012. Logan parted company with the Magpies after he failed to score in his six appearances with Dorchester and joined Isthmian League Premier Division side Bury Town on 16 January 2013. At the end of January, he was offered a trial by Torquay United, and very nearly signed a one-month contract, but this fell through due to Logan suffering a calf injury.
