= 2012–13 Exeter City F.C. season =

Exeter City
2012–13 season
- Chairman: Edward Chorlton
- Manager: Paul Tisdale
- Ground: St James Park
- League Two: 10th
- FA Cup: First round
- League Cup: First round
- FL Trophy: First round
Home colours	Away colours	Third colours

The 2012–13 season was Exeter City's 111th season in existence and their first season back in League Two, the fourth tier of English football, following their relegation from League One in the previous season. The club finished 10th in League Two, and also participated in the FA Cup, League Cup and League Trophy, where they were eliminated in the first round in all three competitions. The season covered the period from 1 July 2012 to 30 June 2013.

== Competitions ==
=== League Two ===
==== League table ====
Pos	Team	Pld	W	D	L	GF	GA	GD	Pts
8	Chesterfield	46	18	13	15	60	45	+15	67
9	Oxford United	46	19	8	19	59	60	−1	65
10	Exeter City	46	18	10	18	63	62	+1	64
11	Southend United	46	16	13	17	61	55	+6	61
12	Rochdale	46	16	13	17	68	70	−2	61

Updated to match(es) played on 27 April 2013. Source: BBC Sport
Rules for classification: 1) Points; 2) Goal difference; 3) Number of goals scored

==== Matches ====
League Two match details
Date	Time	Opponent	Venue	Result	Score F–A	Scorers	Attendance	Ref.
18 August 2012	15:00	Morecambe	H	L	0–3		3,792	
21 August 2012	19:45	Aldershot Town	A	W	2–1	Cureton 14', 73'	2,678	
25 August 2012	15:00	Accrington Stanley	A	W	3–0	Gow 14', 54', Bauzà 90+3'	1,149	
1 September 2012	15:00	Burton Albion	H	W	3–0	Cureton 19', Davies 41', O'Flynn 89'	3,707	
8 September 2012	15:00	Oxford United	A	W	4–2	Cureton 11', 50', Bennett 27', O'Flynn 72'	6,405	
15 September 2012	15:00	York City	H	D	1–1	O'Flynn 83'	4,092	
18 September 2012	19:45	Wycombe Wanderers	H	W	3–2	Davies 29', Cureton 54', Coles 67'	3,365	
22 September 2012	15:00	Southend United	A	L	1–2	Bennett 51'	4,964	
29 September 2012	15:00	Bristol Rovers	H	L	1–2	Cureton 66'	5,054	
2 October 2012	20:00	Barnet	A	W	2–1	Cureton 35', 67'	1,483	
6 October 2012	15:00	Port Vale	H	L	0–2		3,938	
13 October 2012	15:00	Northampton Town	A	L	0–3		4,607	
20 October 2012	15:00	Chesterfield	H	L	0–1		3,668	
23 October 2012	19:45	Dagenham & Redbridge	A	D	1–1	Cureton 51'	1,487	
27 October 2012	15:00	Cheltenham Town	A	L	0–3		3,545	
6 November 2012	19:45	AFC Wimbledon	H	W	2–0	Cureton 32', O'Flynn 71'	3,249	
10 November 2012	15:00	Fleetwood Town	H	D	2–2	Cureton 24', O'Flynn 57' pen.	3,540	
17 November 2012	15:00	Bradford City	A	W	1–0	Cureton 44'	10,434	
20 November 2012	19:45	Gillingham	A	W	3–2	Gow 27', Cureton 54', 87'	6,851	
24 November 2012	15:00	Rotherham United	H	L	0–1		3,954	
8 December 2012	15:00	Rochdale	A	W	3–2	Baldwin 24', O'Flynn 27', 38'	1,796	
15 December 2012	12:00	Plymouth Argyle	H	D	1–1	Sercombe 34'	6,447	
26 December 2012	15:00	Oxford United	H	L	1–3	Cureton 67' pen.	4,437	
29 December 2012	15:00	Barnet	H	D	2–2	Coles 34', Bennett 45'	4,085	
1 January 2013	15:00	Wycombe Wanderers	A	W	1–0	Hause 83' o.g.	3,679	
5 January 2013	15:00	York City	A	W	2–1	Rodman 14' o.g., Keohane 53'	3,506	
12 January 2013	15:00	Southend United	H	W	3–0	O'Flynn 43', 87', Bennett 80'	3,971	
15 January 2013	20:00	Torquay United	A	D	1–1	Gow 84' pen.	4,476	
28 January 2013	19:45	Torquay United	H	L	0–1		4,824	
2 February 2013	15:00	Aldershot Town	H	D	0–0		3,755	
9 February 2013	15:00	Morecambe	A	W	3–0	Cureton 61', 90+3'	1,840	
15 February 2013	19:45	Accrington Stanley	H	W	2–0	Keohane 79', 82'	3,924	
23 February 2013	15:00	Burton Albion	A	L	2–4	Bauzà 70', Bennett 74'	2,823	
26 February 2013	19:45	Port Vale	A	W	2–0	Cureton 11', Coles 33'	4,480	
2 March 2013	15:00	Northampton Town	H	W	3–0	Nicholls 22' o.g., Cureton 59', Gosling 83'	4,666	
6 March 2013	19:45	Bristol Rovers	A	L	0–2		7,107	
9 March 2013	15:00	Fleetwood Town	A	D	0–0		2,097	
12 March 2013	19:45	Gillingham	H	D	0–0		3,608	
16 March 2013	15:00	Bradford City	H	W	4–1	Duke 11' o.g., D'Ath 45+1', Bennett 84', O'Flynn 89'	4,199	
30 March 2013	13:00	Plymouth Argyle	A	L	0–1		13,251	
1 April 2013	15:00	Rochdale	H	L	1–2	Cureton 45+1'	3,979	
6 April 2013	15:00	Dagenham & Redbridge	H	L	0–1		3,755	
9 April 2013	19:45	Rotherham United	A	L	1–4	Coles 77'	6,703	
13 April 2013	15:00	AFC Wimbledon	A	D	2–2	Reid 36', 61'	4,749	
20 April 2013	15:00	Cheltenham Town	H	L	0–1		5,247	
27 April 2013	15:00	Chesterfield	A	L	0–4		5,762	

=== FA Cup ===
FA Cup match details
Round	Date	Time	Opponent	Venue	Result	Score F–A	Scorers	Attendance	Ref.
First round	3 November 2012	15:00	Bury	A	L	0–1		1,821	

=== League Cup ===
League Cup match details
Round	Date	Time	Opponent	Venue	Result	Score F–A	Scorers	Attendance	Ref.
First round	14 August 2012	19:45	Crystal Palace	H	L	1–2	O'Flynn 2'	3,650	

=== Football League Trophy ===
Football League Trophy match details
Round	Date	Time	Opponent	Venue	Result	Score F–A	Scorers	Attendance	Ref.
First round	4 September 2012	19:15	Aldershot Town	H	D	0–0 (3–4 p)		1,944	

== Statistics ==
=== Appearances and goals ===
No.	Pos	Nat	Player	Total		League One		FA Cup		League Cup		JP Trophy	
No.	Pos	Nat	Player	Apps	Goals	Apps	Goals	Apps	Goals	Apps	Goals	Apps	Goals
1	GK	(Poland) POL	Artur Krysiak	35	0	32+0	0	1+0	0	1+0	0	1+0	0
2	DF	(England) ENG	Steve Tully	24	0	20+2	0	1+0	0	0+0	0	1+0	0
4	DF	(England) ENG	Scot Bennett	36	5	33+0	5	1+0	0	1+0	0	1+0	0
6	DF	(England) ENG	Danny Coles	38	3	36+0	3	1+0	0	1+0	0	0+0	0
7	MF	(England) ENG	Liam Sercombe	23	1	18+2	1	1+0	0	1+0	0	1+0	0
10	FW	(Scotland) SCO	Alan Gow	26	4	19+4	4	1+0	0	0+1	0	1+0	0
18	MF	(England) ENG	Elliott Frear	4	0	0+2	0	0+0	0	0+1	0	0+1	0
19	FW	(Republic of Ireland) IRL	John O'Flynn	31	11	18+10	10	0+1	0	1+0	1	1+0	0
20	FW	(England) ENG	Tom Nichols	3	0	0+3	0	0+0	0	0+0	0	0+0	0
21	FW	(Spain) ESP	Guillem Bauza	17	2	3+12	2	0+0	0	1+0	0	1+0	0
22	MF	(Republic of Ireland) IRL	Jimmy Keohane	26	3	12+13	3	0+0	0	0+0	0	0+1	0
23	MF	(England) ENG	Aaron Dawson	5	0	0+4	0	0+1	0	0+0	0	0+0	0
24	DF	(England) ENG	Craig Woodman	36	0	34+0	0	1+0	0	0+0	0	1+0	0
25	DF	(England) ENG	Pat Baldwin	36	1	33+0	1	1+0	0	1+0	0	1+0	0
26	FW	(England) ENG	Jamie Cureton	35	20	31+2	20	1+0	0	0+1	0	0+0	0
27	MF	(England) ENG	Matt Oakley	35	0	31+3	0	1+0	0	0+0	0	0+0	0
28	MF	(England) ENG	Arron Davies	28	3	22+5	3	0+0	0	1+0	0	0+0	0
29	DF	(England) ENG	Kevin Amankwaah	31	0	22+7	0	1+0	0	1+0	0	0+0	0
30	MF	(Northern Ireland) NIR	Tommy Doherty	27	0	18+7	0	0+0	0	1+0	0	1+0	0
31	MF	(England) ENG	Mark Molesley	6	0	6+0	0	0+0	0	0+0	0	0+0	0
32	MF	(England) ENG	Jake Gosling	5	1	2+3	1	0+0	0	0+0	0	0+0	0
33	DF	(England) ENG	Jordan Moore-Taylor	7	0	2+3	0	0+0	0	1+0	0	1+0	0
34	FW	(Wales) WAL	Elliott Chamberlain	3	0	0+2	0	0+0	0	0+0	0	0+1	0
35	MF	(England) ENG	Jacob Cane	1	0	0+1	0	0+0	0	0+0	0	0+0	0
36	FW	(England) ENG	Jamie Reid	1	0	0+1	0	0+0	0	0+0	0	0+0	0
37	GK	(England) ENG	Rhys Evans	4	0	4+0	0	0+0	0	0+0	0	0+0	0

=== Goalscorers ===
Name	League	FA Cup	League Cup	JP Trophy	Total
Scot Bennett	5	0	0	0	5
Danny Coles	3	0	0	0	3
Liam Sercombe	1	0	0	0	1
Alan Gow	4	0	0	0	4
John O'Flynn	11	0	1	0	12
Guillem Bauza	2	0	0	0	2
Jimmy Keohane	3	0	0	0	3
Pat Baldwin	1	0	0	0	1
Jamie Cureton	20	0	0	0	20
Arron Davies	3	0	0	0	3
Jake Gosling	1	0	0	0	1
OWN GOALS	0	0	0	0	0
Total	0	0	0	0	0

== Transfers ==
=== In ===
Date	Position	Name	From	Fee	Ref.
18 June 2012	GK	(England) Rhys Evans	(England) Staines Town	Free	
2 July 2012	DF	(England) Kevin Amankwaah	(England) Rochdale	Free	
2 July 2012	DF	(England) Pat Baldwin	(England) Southend United	Free	
5 July 2012	MF	(Wales) Arron Davies	(England) Northampton Town	Free	
5 July 2012	MF	(Northern Ireland) Tommy Doherty	(Northern Ireland) Free Agent	Free	
9 July 2012	DF	(England) Craig Woodman	(England) Brentford	Free	
31 July 2012	MF	(England) Matt Oakley	(England) Leicester City	Free	
31 July 2012	FW	(England) Jamie Cureton	(England) Leyton Orient	Free	
20 August 2012	FW	(Wales) Elliott Chamberlain	(England) Leicester City	Free	

=== Loans in ===
Date	Position	Name	Club	Return	Ref.

=== Out ===
Date	Position	Name	To	Fee	Ref.
10 May 2012	FW	(Wales) Daniel Nardiello	(England) Rotherham United	Free	
10 May 2012	DF	(England) Luke O'Brien	(England) Oxford United	Free	
15 May 2012	MF	(England) Callum McNish	(England) Braintree Town	Free	
21 May 2012	MF	(Scotland) David Noble	(England) Rotherham United	Free	
21 May 2012	MF	(England) Chris Shephard	(England) Eastbourne Borough	Free	
21 May 2012	FW	(England) Richard Logan	(England) Wycombe Wanderers	Free	
21 May 2012	GK	(England) Lenny Pidgeley	(Wales) Newport County	Free	
25 May 2012	MF	(England) James Dunne	(England) Stevenage	Tribunal	
26 June 2012	DF	(England) Troy Archibald-Henville	(England) Swindon Town	Tribunal	
6 July 2012	DF	(Wales) Richard Duffy	(England) Port Vale	Free	
11 July 2012	DF	(England) Billy Jones	(England) Cheltenham Town	Free	
26 July 2012	DF	(England) Jonathan Fortune	(England) Barnet	Free	

=== Loans out ===
Date	Position	Name	Club	Return	Ref.

=== Trial players ===
Nat.	Player	Notes	Ref
(England)	Stephen Brogan	Trial	
(Wales)	Elliott Chamberlain	Trial	
