= 2011–12 Exeter City F.C. season =

Exeter City
2011–12 season
- Chairman: Edward Chorlton
- Manager: Paul Tisdale
- League One: 23rd (relegated)
- FA Cup: First round
- League Cup: Second round
- Football League Trophy: Second round
- Top goalscorer: League: Daniel Nardiello (9); All: Daniel Nardiello (11)
- Highest home attendance: 6,045 vs. Sheffield United, 5 May 2012; All: 8,290 vs Liverpool, 24 August 2011
- Lowest home attendance: 3,474 vs. Notts County, 13 September 2011; All: 2,627 vs Swindon Town, 4 October 2011
- Average home league attendance: 4,474
Home colours	Away colours	Third colours

During the 2011-12 season, Exeter City, competed in League One, the third tier of English football, in the 110th season in the club's history. The club finished 23rd in League One, and were subsequently relegated to League Two, English football's fourth tier. They also participated in the FA Cup, League Cup and League Trophy, being eliminated in the first round of the FA Cup, and the second round of the other two competitions. The season covered the period from 1 July 2011 to 30 June 2012.

== League table ==
Pos	Team	Pld	W	D	L	GF	GA	GD	Pts	Promotion, qualification or relegation
20	Leyton Orient	46	13	11	22	48	75	−27	50	
21	Wycombe Wanderers (R)	46	11	10	25	65	88	−23	43	Relegation to Football League Two
22	Chesterfield (R)	46	10	12	24	56	81	−25	42	Relegation to Football League Two
23	Exeter City (R)	46	10	12	24	46	75	−29	42	Relegation to Football League Two
24	Rochdale (R)	46	8	14	24	47	81	−34	38	Relegation to Football League Two

Updated to match(es) played on 5 May 2012. Source: BBC Sport
Rules for classification: 1) Points; 2) Goal difference; 3) Number of goals scored
(R) Relegated

== Statistics ==
=== Appearances and goals ===
No.	Pos	Nat	Player	Total		League One		FA Cup		League Cup		FL Trophy	
No.	Pos	Nat	Player	Apps	Goals	Apps	Goals	Apps	Goals	Apps	Goals	Apps	Goals
1	GK	(Poland) POL	Artur Krysiak	42	0	38+0	0	1+0	0	2+0	0	1+0	0
2	DF	(England) ENG	Steve Tully	49	0	42+2	0	2+0	0	1+0	0	2+0	0
3	DF	(England) ENG	Billy Jones	21	1	16+3	1	0+0	0	1+0	0	0+1	0
4	MF	(England) ENG	James Dunne	51	3	44+1	2	2+0	0	2+0	0	2+0	1
5	DF	(England) ENG	Troy Archibald-Henville	51	2	45+0	2	2+0	0	2+0	0	2+0	0
6	DF	(Wales) WAL	Richard Duffy	34	0	22+6	0	1+1	0	2+0	0	2+0	0
7	MF	(England) ENG	Liam Sercombe	36	7	27+6	7	2+0	0	1+0	0	0+0	0
8	MF	(Scotland) SCO	David Noble	46	3	42+0	2	1+0	1	2+0	0	1+0	0
10	FW	(Wales) WAL	Daniel Nardiello	40	11	28+8	9	1+0	0	1+0	1	2+0	1
11	DF	(England) ENG	Luke O'Brien	3	0	2+1	0	0+0	0	0+0	0	0+0	0
14	MF	(England) ENG	Chris Shephard	17	1	7+4	0	2+0	0	2+0	1	0+2	0
18	DF	(England) ENG	Danny Coles	36	2	28+3	2	2+0	0	1+0	0	2+0	0
19	FW	(Ireland) EIR	John O'Flynn	26	2	8+16	2	2+0	0	0+0	0	0+0	0
20	FW	(England) ENG	Richard Logan	33	6	11+17	5	1+1	1	1+0	0	0+2	0
21	FW	(Spain) ESP	Guillem Bauza	30	3	12+15	2	0+0	0	1+1	1	1+0	0
22	MF	(Ireland) EIR	Jimmy Keohane	6	0	0+4	0	0+1	0	0+1	0	0+0	0
23	DF	(England) ENG	Jonathan Fortune	5	0	5+0	0	0+0	0	0+0	0	0+0	0
24	MF	(England) ENG	Elliott Frear	12	1	5+5	0	0+2	1	0+0	0	0+0	0
26	DF	(England) ENG	Scot Bennett	15	3	13+2	3	0+0	0	0+0	0	0+0	0
28	MF	(England) ENG	Aaron Dawson	2	0	2+0	0	0+0	0	0+0	0	0+0	0
29	FW	(England) ENG	Tom Nichols	12	1	2+5	1	0+1	0	0+2	0	2+0	0
31	MF	(England) ENG	Callum McNish	7	0	2+3	0	0+0	0	0+2	0	0+0	0
36	FW	(Scotland) SCO	Alan Gow	7	3	6+1	3	0+0	0	0+0	0	0+0	0
40	GK	(England) ENG	Lenny Pidgeley	12	0	8+2	0	1+0	0	0+0	0	1+0	0
Players who left Exeter before the end of the season:
11	MF	(England) ENG	Scott Golbourne	32	0	26+0	0	2+0	0	2+0	0	2+0	0
34	MF	(England) ENG	Rohan Ricketts	1	0	0+1	0	0+0	0	0+0	0	0+0	0
Players who played on loan for Exeter and returned to their parent club:
35	MF	(Wales) WAL	Jake Taylor	30	3	26+4	3	0+0	0	0+0	0	0+0	0
12	FW	(England) ENG	Jamie Cureton	7	1	5+2	1	0+0	0	0+0	0	0+0	0
12	MF	(England) ENG	Matt Oakley	7	0	7+0	0	0+0	0	0+0	0	0+0	0
12	FW	(England) ENG	Nicholas Bignall	3	0	3+0	0	0+0	0	0+0	0	0+0	0
32	FW	(England) ENG	Rowan Vine	5	0	4+1	0	0+0	0	0+0	0	0+0	0
34	MF	(England) ENG	Chris Hackett	5	0	5+0	0	0+0	0	0+0	0	0+0	0
34	FW	(England) ENG	Matt Whichelow	3	0	2+0	0	0+0	0	0+0	0	1+0	0
30	FW	(Finland) FIN	Lauri Dalla Valle	5	0	4+1	0	0+0	0	0+0	0	0+0	0
27	DF	(England) ENG	Pat Baldwin	9	0	9+0	0	0+0	0	0+0	0	0+0	0

=== Top scorers ===
Position	Nation	Number	Name	League One	FA Cup	League Cup	FL Trophy	Total
FW	(Wales)	10	Daniel Nardiello	9	0	1	1	11
MF	(England)	7	Liam Sercombe	7	0	0	0	7
FW	(England)	20	Richard Logan	5	1	0	0	6
MF	(Wales)	35	Jake Taylor	3	0	0	0	3
MF	(England)	26	Scot Bennett	3	0	0	0	3
FW	(Scotland)	36	Alan Gow	3	0	0	0	3
FW	(Spain)	21	Guillem Bauza	2	0	1	0	3
MF	(England)	4	James Dunne	2	0	0	1	3
MF	(Scotland)	8	David Noble	2	1	0	0	3
FW	(Republic of Ireland)	19	John O'Flynn	2	0	0	0	2
DF	(England)	18	Danny Coles	2	0	0	0	2
DF	(England)	5	Troy Archibald-Henville	2	0	0	0	2
FW	(England)	29	Tom Nichols	1	0	0	0	1
DF	(England)	3	Billy Jones	1	0	0	0	1
FW	(England)	12	Jamie Cureton	1	0	0	0	1
MF	(England)	14	Chris Shephard	0	0	1	0	1
MF	(England)	24	Elliott Frear	0	1	0	0	1
			Own Goals	1	0	0	0	1
/	/	/	Totals	46	3	3	2	54

=== Disciplinary record ===
Position	Nation	Number	Name	League One		FA Cup		League Cup		League Trophy		Total	
Position	Nation	Number	Name	Y	R	Y	R	Y	R	Y	R	Y	R
FW	(Wales)	10	Daniel Nardiello	9	1	0	0	0	0	0	0	9	1
DF	(England)	5	Troy Archibald-Henville	6	0	0	0	0	0	1	0	7	0
MF	(Scotland)	8	David Noble	6	1	0	0	0	0	0	0	6	1
MF	(England)	4	James Dunne	6	0	0	0	0	0	0	0	6	0
DF	(England)	2	Steve Tully	3	1	0	0	0	0	1	0	4	1
DF	(England)	18	Danny Coles	2	1	0	0	0	0	1	0	3	1
DF	(Wales)	6	Richard Duffy	2	0	0	0	0	0	0	0	2	0
DF	(England)	3	Billy Jones	2	0	0	0	0	0	0	0	2	0
MF	(England)	7	Liam Sercombe	2	0	0	0	0	0	0	0	2	0
FW	(Spain)	21	Guillem Bauza	2	0	0	0	0	0	0	0	2	0
FW	(England)	20	Richard Logan	2	0	0	0	0	0	0	0	2	0
DF	(England)	26	Scot Bennett	2	0	0	0	0	0	0	0	2	0
GK	(England)	40	Lenny Pidgeley	0	0	0	0	0	0	1	0	1	0
MF	(England)	12	Matt Oakley	1	0	0	0	0	0	0	0	1	0
FW	(England)	29	Tom Nichols	0	0	1	0	0	0	0	0	1	0
MF	(Wales)	35	Jake Taylor	1	0	0	0	0	0	0	0	1	0
MF	(England)	34	Chris Hackett	1	0	0	0	0	0	0	0	1	0
DF	(England)	11	Luke O'Brien	1	0	0	0	0	0	0	0	1	0
MF	(England)	14	Chris Shephard	1	0	0	0	0	0	0	0	1	0
MF	(England)	31	Callum McNish	1	0	0	0	0	0	0	0	1	0
FW	(Scotland)	36	Alan Gow	1	0	0	0	0	0	0	0	1	0
			Totals	50	4	1	0	0	0	4	0	56	4

== Results ==
=== Pre-season friendlies ===
8 July 2011	Dorchester Town	1–1	Exeter City	The Avenue Stadium
19:45

12 July 2011	Mangotsfield Utd	1–3	Exeter City	Cossham Street
19:45	O'Sullivan 15'		Frear 28'; Nichols 57'; Shephard 65'	Referee: Mr P. Rees

15 July 2011	Fana FC	2–3	Exeter City	Fana Stadium
18:30

16 July 2011	Os FC	1–4	Exeter City	Kuventræ Stadium
15:00

20 July 2011	Torquay United	3–0	Exeter City	Plainmoor
19:45	Howe 15'; Kee 29'; Morris 74'			Attendance: 2,065

22 July 2011	Clevedon Town	1–4	Exeter City	Hand Stadium
19:30	88'		Shephard 36'; Gosling 42'; Nichols 65' (pen.); McNish 78'

30 July 2011	Exeter City	1–0	Derby County	St James Park
15:00	Shephard 25'

2 August 2011	Chippenham Town	0–2	Exeter City	Hardenhuish Park
19:45

=== League One ===
6 August 2011 1	Stevenage	0–0	Exeter City	Broadhall Way
15:00				Attendance: 3,829

13 August 2011 2	Exeter City	0–2	Milton Keynes Dons	St James Park
15:00			Ibehre 23'; Bowditch 90'	Attendance: 4,832

16 August 2011 3	Exeter City	1–2	Brentford	St James Park
19:45	Bauza 66' (pen.)		Dunne 18' (o.g.); Donaldson 37'	Attendance: 4,344

20 August 2011 4	Preston North End	1–0	Exeter City	Deepdale
15:00	Proctor 41'			Attendance: 10,655

27 August 2011 5	Exeter City	2–1	Chesterfield	St James Park
15:00	Archibald-Henville 16'; Nichols 82'		Whitaker 33' (pen.)	Attendance: 4,113

3 September 2011 6	Hartlepool United	2–0	Exeter City	Victoria Park
15:00	Liddle 5'; Luscombe 89'			Attendance: 5,152

10 September 2011 7	Charlton Athletic	2–0	Exeter City	The Valley
15:00	Wright-Phillips 43'; Stephens 81'			Attendance: 14,290

13 September 2011 8	Exeter City	1–1	Notts County	St James Park
19:45	Sheehan 8' (o.g.)		Burgess 16'	Attendance: 3,474

17 September 2011 9	Exeter City	0–2	Bournemouth	St James Park
15:00			Thomas 38'; Duffy 90' (o.g.)	Attendance: 4,593

24 September 2011 10	Sheffield Wednesday	3–0	Exeter City	Hillsborough Stadium
15:00	O'Connor 40'; Madine 43', 75' (pen.)			Attendance: 16,995

1 October 2011 11	Exeter City	2–0	Oldham Athletic	St James Park
15:00	Nardiello 18'; Bauzà 49'			Attendance: 3,753

8 October 2011 12	Bury	2–0	Exeter City	Gigg Lane
15:00	Bishop 14'; Oakley 48' (o.g.)			Attendance: 2,672

15 October 2011 13	Exeter City	0–4	Huddersfield Town	St James Park
15:00			Lee 8'; Rhodes 26', 65', 89'	Attendance: 4,244

22 October 2011 14	Exeter City	3–1	Rochdale	St James Park
15:00	Nardiello 45', 56' (pen.); Taylor 81'		Eccleston 31'	Attendance: 3,844

25 October 2011 15	Walsall	1–2	Exeter City	Bescot Stadium
19:45	Nicholls 12'		Nardiello 8', 78'	Attendance: 4,003

29 October 2011 16	Sheffield United	4–4	Exeter City	Bramall Lane
15:00	Phillips 45', 85'; Clarke 65'; Lowton 70'		Nardiello 9'; Noble 23'; O'Flynn 82'; Dunne 86'	Attendance: 17,052

5 November 2011 17	Exeter City	0–0	Carlisle United	St James Park
15:00				Attendance: 4,245

19 November 2011 18	Yeovil Town	2–2	Exeter City	Huish Park
15:00	Upson 2' (yellow card) 41'; Blizzard 56'; D'Ath (yellow card) 81'; Obika (yellow card) 82'; Paul Wotton (yellow card) 88'		Taylor 4'; O'Flynn 30' (pen.); Tully (yellow card) 79'	Attendance: 5,635

26 November 2011 19	Exeter City	3–0	Tranmere Rovers	St James Park
15:00	Bennett 41'; Coles 66'; Logan 78'			Attendance: 4,108

10 December 2011 20	Leyton Orient	3–0	Exeter City	Brisbane Road
15:00	Lisbie 65' (pen.), 87' (pen.); Téhoué 75' (yellow card) 76'; Craig (yellow card) 81'		Sercombe (yellow card) 38'; Taylor (yellow card) 45+3'; Noble (yellow card) 85'	Attendance: 4,291

17 December 2011 21	Exeter City	0–0	Scunthorpe United	St James Park
15:00	Hackett (yellow card) 31'		Barcham (yellow card) 11'; Wright (yellow card) 90+1'	Attendance: 4,470

26 December 2011 22	Wycombe Wanderers	3–1	Exeter City	Adams Park
15:00	Trotta 2', 40', 88' (yellow card) 89'; Lewis (yellow card) 3'; McCoy (yellow card) 39'; Winfield (yellow card) 60'; Bloomfield (yellow card) 79'		Coles 23' (yellow card) 25'; Nardiello (yellow card) 76'	Attendance: 4,904

31 December 2011 23	Colchester United	2–0	Exeter City	Colchester Community Stadium
15:00	Wordsworth 16' (yellow card) 50'; Bond 62'		Bauzà (yellow card) 15'; Dunne (yellow card) 50'; Coles (red card) 64'	Attendance: 3,667

2 January 2012 24	Exeter City	1–1	Yeovil Town	St James Park
15:00	Nardiello (yellow card) 56'; Logan (yellow card) 69' (goal) 75'		MacLean (yellow card) 18'; Williams 40' (yellow card) 70'; Williams (yellow card) 54'; D'Ath (yellow card) 62'	Attendance: 5,912

7 January 2012 25	Chesterfield	0–2	Exeter City	B2net Stadium
15:00	Allott (yellow card) 67'		Archibald-Henville (yellow card) 76'; Logan 78'; Sercombe 87'	Attendance: 5,856

14 January 2012 26	Exeter City	0–0	Hartlepool United	St James Park
15:00				Attendance: 4,016

21 January 2012 27	Oldham Athletic	0–0	Exeter City	Boundary Park
15:00			Noble (yellow card) 14'; Tully (yellow card) 85'	Attendance: 3,587

28 January 2012 28	Exeter City	0–1	Charlton Athletic	St James Park
15:00			Green 55'; Wiggins (yellow card) 90+3'	Attendance: 5,439

7 February 2012 29	Bournemouth	2–0	Exeter City	Dean Court
19:45	Tubbs 72'; Malone 78'		Nardiello (yellow card) 86'	Attendance: 5,497

11 February 2012 30	Exeter City	2–1	Sheffield Wednesday	St James Park
15:00	Jones 68'; Nardiello (yellow card) 74'; Noble 84'		Johnson 65' (yellow card) 84'	Attendance: 5,555

14 February 2012 31	Notts County	2–1	Exeter City	Meadow Lane
19:45	Hughes 8'; Hughes 28' (pen.); Harley (yellow card) 85'		Bennett 14'; Noble (yellow card) 39'; Nardiello (yellow card) 82'	Attendance: 4,741

18 February 2012 32	Exeter City	3–2	Bury	St James Park
15:00	Archibald-Henville 5'; Nardiello 9' (pen.); Bennett (yellow card) 36'; Logan 41'		Sodje (yellow card) 8'; Amoo 29'; Picken (yellow card) 32'; Eastham 90+2'	Attendance: 4,281

25 February 2012 33	Huddersfield Town	2–0	Exeter City	Galpharm Stadium
15:00	McCombe 40'; Rhodes 85'			Attendance: 14,105

3 March 2012 34	Exeter City	1–1	Stevenage	St James Park
15:00	Logan 16'; Dunne (yellow card) 67'		Shroot (yellow card) 40' (goal) 64'; Slew (yellow card) 90'	Attendance: 4,437

6 March 2012 35	Brentford	2–0	Exeter City	Griffin Park
19:45	Berahino 41', 69'		Logan (yellow card) 38'; O'Brien (yellow card) 40'; Noble (red card) 67'	Attendance: 4,124

10 March 2012 36	Milton Keynes Dons	3–0	Exeter City	Stadium mk
15:00	Kouo-Doumbé 17'; McDonald 27'; Ibehre 78'		Shephard (yellow card) 49'	Attendance: 9,016

17 March 2012 37	Exeter City	1–2	Preston North End	St James Park
15:00	Sercombe 65'		Hume 12', 84'; Nicholson (yellow card) 27'; Miller (yellow card) 71'; Holroyd (yellow card) 78'	Attendance: 4,741

20 March 2012 38	Exeter City	1–3	Wycombe Wanderers	St James Park
19:45	Dunne 66'		Hayes 58', 70'; Beavon 63' (yellow card) 88'; Johnson (yellow card) 65'	Attendance: 4,121

24 March 2012 39	Tranmere Rovers	2–0	Exeter City	Prenton Park
15:00	Labadie 49' (yellow card) 50'; Cassidy 90+3'		Nardiello (yellow card) 35'	Attendance: 4,786

31 March 2012 40	Exeter City	1–1	Colchester United	St James Park
15:00	McNish (yellow card) 20'; Dunne (yellow card) 75'; Cureton 83'		Duguid 6'; Rose (yellow card) 25'; Henderson (yellow card) 61'	Attendance: 3,889

6 April 2012 41	Scunthorpe United	1–0	Exeter City	Glanford Park
15:00	Parkin 76'			Attendance: 4,361

9 April 2012 42	Exeter City	3–0	Leyton Orient	St James Park
15:00	Taylor 4'; Archibald-Henville (yellow card) 56'; Sercombe 60', 63'		Leacock (yellow card) 62'	Attendance: 4,142

14 April 2012 43	Rochdale	3–2	Exeter City	Spotland Stadium
15:00	Twaddle (yellow card) 58'; Adams 79'; Thompson 81'; Kennedy 88'		Nardiello 28' (pen.); Sercombe 62'	Attendance: 1,930

21 April 2012 44	Exeter City	4–2	Walsall	St James Park
15:00	Nardiello 50'; Gow 69', 77'; Sercombe 88'		Smith (yellow card) 12' (yellow-red card) 66'; Nicholls 30'; Cuvelier 55'; Ledesma (yellow card) 90+6'	Attendance: 4,307

28 April 2012 45	Carlisle United	4–1	Exeter City	Brunton Park
15:00	Zoko 34', 77'; Cook 42'; Noble 51'		Sercombe 35'	Attendance: 6,029

5 May 2012 46	Exeter City	2–2	Sheffield United	St James Park
15:00	Gow 24' (yellow card) 70'; Dunne (yellow card) 45+3'; Bennett (yellow card) 78' (goal) 90+3'		Williamson (yellow card) 10' (goal) 44'; Beattie (red card) 37'; Doyle (yellow card) 39'; Simonsen (yellow card) 45+4'; McDonald 47'	Attendance: 6,045

=== FA Cup ===
12 November 2011 First round	Exeter City	1–1	Walsall	Exeter
15:00 BST	Noble 90+4'	Summary	Wilson 21'; Butler (yellow card) 27'; Beevers (yellow card) 29'; Gnakpa (yellow card) 48'	Stadium: St James Park; Attendance: 3,026; Referee: James Linington

23 November 2011 First round replay	Walsall	3–2	Exeter City	Walsall
19:45 BST	Macken 64'; Nicholls 69'; Bowerman 98'	Summary	Logan 41'; Frear 77'; Nichols (yellow card) 108'	Stadium: Bescot Stadium; Attendance: 2,089; Referee: Dean Mohareb

=== League Cup ===
9 August 2011 First round	Exeter City	2–0	Yeovil Town	St James Park
19:45	Bauza 63'; Shephard 90+4'			Attendance: 3,856

24 August 2011 Second round	Exeter City	1–3	Liverpool	St James Park
19:45	Nardiello 80' (pen.)		Suárez 23'; Maxi 55'; Carroll 58'	Attendance: 8,290

=== FL Trophy ===
30 August 2011 First round	Exeter City	1–1 (3–0 p)	Plymouth Argyle	St James Park
19:45	Dunne 42'		Daley 60'	Attendance: 3,940
	Penalties
	Nardiello (penalty scored); Noble (penalty scored); Shephard (penalty missed); Dunne (penalty scored)		Williams (penalty missed); Fletcher (penalty missed); Hitchcock (penalty missed)

4 October 2011 Second round	Exeter City	1–2	Swindon Town	St James Park
19:15	Nardiello 72'; Coles (yellow card) 82'		Jervis 18', 35'; Ahmed Abdullah (yellow card) 75'	Attendance: 2,627

== Transfers ==
Players transferred in
Date	Pos.	Name	From	Fee	Ref.
15 May 2011	FW	(Spain) Guillem Bauza	(England) Northampton Town	Free	
11 June 2011	DF	(England) Danny Coles	(England) Bristol Rovers	Free	
16 June 2011	GK	(England) Lenny Pidgeley	(England) Bradford City	Free	
26 July 2011	MF	(England) Callum McNish	(England) Southampton	Free	
17 August 2011	MF	(Republic of Ireland) Jimmy Keohane	(England) Bristol City	Free	
31 January 2012	DF	(England) Luke O'Brien	(England) Bradford City	Undisclosed	
9 March 2012	DF	(England) Jonathan Fortune	(England) Charlton Athletic	Free	
22 March 2012	MF	(England) Rohan Ricketts	(Republic of Ireland) Shamrock Rovers	Free	
22 March 2012	FW	(Scotland) Alan Gow	(India) East Bengal	Free	
Players loaned in
Date from	Pos.	Name	From	Date to	Ref.
2 August 2011	FW	(England) Nicholas Bignall	(England) Reading	2 September 2011	
27 August 2011	FW	(England) Rowan Vine	(England) Queens Park Rangers	27 September 2011	
15 September 2011	MF	(England) Matthew Whichelow	(England) Watford	15 October 2011	
21 September 2011	MF	(Wales) Jake Taylor	(England) Reading	End of season	
30 September 2011	MF	(England) Matt Oakley	(England) Leicester City	1 December 2011	
24 November 2011	MF	(England) Chris Hackett	(England) Millwall	31 December 2011	
1 March 2012	FW	(England) Jamie Cureton	(England) Leyton Orient	End of season	
16 March 2012	DF	(England) Pat Baldwin	(England) Southend United	5 May 2012	
19 March 2012	FW	(Finland) Lauri Dalla Valle	(England) Fulham	19 April 2012	
Players loaned out
Date from	Pos.	Name	To	Date to	Ref.
24 September 2011	MF	(England) Aaron Dawson	(England) Tiverton Town	24 December 2011	
31 January 2012	MF	(England) Chris Shephard	(England) Bath City	1 March 2012	
Players transferred out
Date	Pos.	Name	To	Fee	Ref.
30 January 2012	MF	(England) Scott Golbourne	(England) Barnsley	Undisclosed	
Players released
Date	Pos.	Name	Subsequent Club	Join Date	Ref.
3 June 2011	DF	(England) Joe Heath	(England) Hereford United	3 June 2011	
13 June 2011	FW	(England) Ben Watson	(England) Eastbourne Borough	13 June 2011	
14 June 2011	FW	(England) James Norwood	(England) Forest Green Rovers	14 June 2011	
24 June 2011	GK	(England) Paul Jones	(England) Peterborough United	24 June 2011	
28 June 2011	FW	(England) Jamie Cureton	(England) Leyton Orient	28 June 2011 (Bosman)	
1 July 2011	DF	(England) Matt Taylor	(England) Charlton Athletic	1 July 2011 (Bosman)	
1 July 2011	MF	(Trinidad and Tobago) Jake Thomson	(England) Kettering Town	16 August 2011	
1 July 2011	GK	(England) Matt Armstrong-Ford	(England) Horsham	?	
17 December 2011	MF	(Republic of Ireland) Kallum Keane	(England) Hucknall Town	17 December 2011	
16 April 2012	MF	(England) Rohan Ricketts	Unattached		

== Awards ==
End of Season Awards	Winner
Fans Player of the Year	Troy Archibald-Henville
Players' Player of the Year	James Dunne
East Devon Grecians' Player of the Year	Troy Archibald-Henville
ECDSA Most Improved Player	Scot Bennett
The Norwegian Grecians' award	James Dunne
Supporters' Trust Young Player of the Year	Jordan Moore-Taylor
Cafe Gourmandine Impact Player Award	Richard Logan
