= 2013–14 Exeter City F.C. season =

Exeter City
2013–14 season
- Manager: Paul Tisdale
- Ground: St James Park, Exeter
- League Two: 16th
- FA Cup: First round
- League Cup: First round
- League Trophy: First round

In 2013–2014, Exeter participated in Football League Two and the Football League Cup, but they were eliminated in the First Round of the competition by Queens Park Rangers. In the FA Cup Exeter City were knocked out by Peterborough United in the First Round. In the League 2 season, Exeter finished in 16th.

== First-team squad ==
No.	Name	Nat	Position	Date of birth	Place of birth	Signed from
Goalkeepers
1	Artur Krysiak	(Poland)	GK	11 August 1989	Łódź	Birmingham City
30	Christy Pym	(England)	GK	24 April 1995	Exeter	–
33	James Hamon	(England)	GK	1 July 1995	Guernsey	Guernsey
Defenders
2	Danny Butterfield	(England)	DF	21 November 1979	Boston	Carlisle United
3	Craig Woodman	(England)	DF	22 December 1982	Tiverton	Brentford
4	Scot Bennett	(England)	DF	30 November 1990	Newquay	–
5	Pat Baldwin	(England)	DF	12 November 1982	London	Southend United
6	Danny Coles	(England)	DF	31 October 1981	Bristol	Bristol Rovers
15	Jordan Moore-Taylor	(England)	DF	21 January 1994	Exeter	–
23	Jacob Wannell	(England)	DF	3 June 1994		–
26	Jordan Tillson	(England)	DF	5 March 1993	Bath	Bristol Rovers
Midfielders
7	Liam Sercombe	(England)	MF	25 April 1990	Exeter	–
8	Matt Oakley	(England)	MF	17 August 1977	Peterborough	Leicester City
10	Alan Gow	(Scotland)	MF	9 October 1982	Clydebank	East Bengal
11	Arron Davies	(Wales)	MF	22 June 1984	Cardiff	Northampton Town
16	Aaron Dawson	(England)	MF	24 March 1992	Exeter	–
17	Paul Tisdale	(England)	MF	14 January 1973	Valletta	Yeovil Town
21	Jake Gosling	(England)	MF	11 August 1993	Newquay	–
24	Jacob Cane	(England)	MF	20 May 1994	Exeter	–
29	Matt Grimes	(England)	MF	15 July 1995	Exeter	–
32	David Wheeler	(England)	MF	4 October 1990	Brighton	Staines Town
35	Matthew Gill	(England)	MF	8 November 1980	Cambridge	Bristol Rovers
Forwards
14	Eliot Richards	(Wales)	FW	10 September 1991	New Tredegar	Bristol Rovers
18	Jamie Reid	(Northern Ireland)	FW	15 July 1994	Torquay	–
19	John O'Flynn	(Republic of Ireland)	FW	11 July 1982	Cobh	Barnet
20	Tom Nichols	(England)	FW	1 September 1993	Taunton	–
22	Jimmy Keohane	(Republic of Ireland)	FW	22 January 1991	Kilkenny	Bristol City
25	Sam Parkin	(Scotland)	FW	14 March 1981	Roehampton	St Mirren
27	Matt Jay	(England)	FW	27 February 1996	Torbay	–
31	Elliott Chamberlain	(Wales)	FW	29 April 1992	Paget Parish	Leicester City
34	Ollie Watkins	(England)	FW	30 December 1995	Torquay	–

== Competitions ==
=== Football League Two ===
==== League table ====
Pos	Team	Pld	W	D	L	GF	GA	GD	Pts
14	Newport County	46	14	16	16	56	59	−3	58
15	Accrington Stanley	46	14	15	17	54	56	−2	57
16	Exeter City	46	14	13	19	54	57	−3	55
17	Cheltenham Town	46	13	16	17	53	63	−10	55
18	Morecambe	46	13	15	18	52	64	−12	54

Updated to match(es) played on 3 May 2014. Source: BBC Sport
Rules for classification: 1) Points; 2) Goal difference; 3) Number of goals scored

==== Results ====
League Two match details
Date	Opponent	Venue	Result	Score F–A	Scorers	Attendance	Ref.
3 August 2013	Bristol Rovers	Home	W	2–1	Coles 59', Parkin 79'		
10 August 2013	Mansfield Town	Away	D	0–0		3,284	
17 August 2013	AFC Wimbledon	Home	W	2–0	O'Flynn 11', 36'	3,881	
24 August 2013	Morecambe	Away	L	0–2			
31 August 2013	York City	Home	W	2–1	Gow 23', 72'	3,448	
7 September 2013	Dagenham & Redbridge	Away	D	1–1	Parkin 80'	2,003	
14 September 2013	Northampton Town	Away	W	2–1	Bennett 35', O'Flynn 90+2'	4,036	
21 September 2013	Newport County	Home	L	0–2		4,614	
28 September 2013	Fleetwood Town	Away	W	2–1	Bennett 76', 79'	2,557	
5 October 2013	Plymouth Argyle	Home	W	3–1			
12 October 2013	Hartlepool United	Home	L	0–3			
19 October 2013	Scunthorpe United	Away	W	4–0			
22 October 2013	Oxford United	Away	D	0–0			
26 October 2013	Burton Albion	Home	L	0–1			
2 November 2013	Portsmouth	Away	L	2–3	Coles 75', O'Flynn 84'	16,168	
16 November 2013	Southend United	Home	L	0–2			
23 November 2013	Rochdale	Away	L	1–3			
26 November 2013	Wycombe Wanderers	Away	D	1–1			
30 November 2013	Bury	Home	D	2–2			
14 December 2013	Accrington Stanley	Away	W	3–2			
20 December 2013	Chesterfield	Home	L	0–2			
26 December 2013	Cheltenham Town	Away	L	0–1		3,562	
29 December 2013	Torquay United	Away	W	3–1	Nichols 38', Wheeler 60', Gow 85'	4,231	
4 January 2014	Mansfield Town	Home	L	0–1			
11 January 2014	Bristol Rovers	Away	L	1–2			
25 January 2014	AFC Wimbledon	Away	L	1–2			
28 January 2014	Oxford United	Home	D	0–0			
1 February 2014	Burton Albion	Away	D	1–1			
8 February 2014	Portsmouth	Home	D	1–1			
15 February 2014	Southend United	Away	W	3–2			
18 February 2014	Morecambe	Home	D	1–1			
22 February 2014	Rochdale	Home	L	0–1			
25 February 2014	Wycombe Wanderers	Home	L	0–1			
1 March 2014	York City	Away	L	1–2			
8 March 2014	Dagenham & Redbridge	Home	D	2–2			
11 March 2014	Northampton Town	Home	L	0–1		2,785	
16 March 2014	Newport County	Away	D	1–1			
22 March 2014	Fleetwood Town	Home	W	3–0			
25 March 2014	Plymouth Argyle	Away	W	2–1	Sercombe 69', Richards 83'	13,442	
29 March 2014	Accrington Stanley	Home	L	0–1			
5 April 2014	Bury	Away	L	0–2			
12 April 2014	Cheltenham Town	Home	D	1–1	Moore-Taylor 12'	3,353	
18 April 2014	Chesterfield	Away	D	1–1			
21 April 2014	Torquay United	Home	L	1–2	Bennett 17'	5,221	
26 April 2014	Scunthorpe United	Home	W	2–0	Woodman 45+1', Keohane 49'	4,187	
3 May 2014	Hartlepool United	Away	W	2–0			

=== FA Cup ===
9 November 2013 First round	Peterborough United	2–0	Exeter City	Peterborough
15:00	Assombalonga 72'; Mendez-Laing 79'	Report		Stadium: London Road; Attendance: 3,379; Referee: Graham Salisbury

=== Football League Cup ===
6 August 2013 First round	Exeter City	0–2	Queens Park Rangers	Exeter
19:45 BST		Report	Austin 3'; Simpson 50'	Stadium: St James Park; Attendance: 5,253; Referee: Jeremy Simpson

=== Football League Trophy ===
3 September 2013 First round	Exeter City	0–2	Wycombe Wanderers	Exeter
19:15		Report	McClure 29'; Stewart 83'	Stadium: St James Park; Attendance: 1,654; Referee: Steve Bratt
