= Chris Sheppard (disambiguation) =

Chris Sheppard (born c. 1963) is a Canadian musician.

Chris Sheppard may also refer to:

- Chris Sheppard (rugby league) (born 1981), Australian rugby league player

== See also ==
- Chris Shepard, American recording engineer
- Chris Shephard (born 1988), English footballer
- Chris Shepherd (born 1967), British television and film writer and director
