= Guillem Bauzà =

Spanish footballer

Personal information
- Full name: Guillem Bauzà Mayol
- Date of birth: 25 October 1984 (age 42)
- Place of birth: Palma, Spain
- Height: 1.80 m (5 ft 11 in)
- Positions: Striker; attacking midfielder

Youth career
- Mallorca

Senior career*
Years	Team	Apps	(Gls)
2003–2005	Mallorca B	35	(4)
2005–2007	Espanyol B	31	(3)
2007–2010	Swansea City	49	(9)
2010–2011	Hereford United	12	(2)
2011	Northampton Town	10	(4)
2011–2013	Exeter City	46	(4)
2013–2014	Port Talbot Town	7	(2)
2014–2016	Merthyr Town	10	(2)
Total		200	(30)

International career
2000–2001	Spain U16	9	(1)
2001	Spain U17	4	(1)
2002–2003	Spain U19	3	(0)
Medal record
Men's Football
Representing Spain
UEFA European Under-16 Championship
Winner	2001 England
- * Club domestic league appearances and goals

Guillem Bauzà Mayol (born 25 October 1984) is a Spanish former footballer who played as a striker, second striker or attacking midfielder.

He spent most of his career in Wales and England, in representation of several clubs including Swansea City. He gained 16 caps for Spain at youth level.

== Club career ==
=== Spain ===
Born in Palma, Majorca, Bauzà joined hometown club RCD Mallorca's youth system at a very early age. He only appeared for the reserves during his tenure.

In 2005, after the team's relegation to Tercera División, Bauzà signed with RCD Espanyol B also in that level, helping the side return to Segunda División B in his first season.

=== Swansea City ===
In the summer of 2007, Bauzà joined Swansea City, being one of Spanish manager Roberto Martínez's first signings alongside countryman Àngel Rangel. He scored twice in a 5–2 victory over Dutch amateurs Alphense Boys during pre-season, but took time to settle into the team as his only starts were in cup games, his first competitive goal coming against Wycombe Wanderers in the Football League Trophy. His first league goal came on 12 January 2008, in a 3–1 win at Luton Town.

Later during the campaign, Bauzà wrote his name in the club's history books when, on 12 April 2008, he netted a brace against Gillingham to secure the Swans' promotion to the Football League Championship. Two weeks later he scored his first hat-trick, helping defeat Leyton Orient 4–1 at the Liberty Stadium in the final matchday; subsequently, as his contract was due to expire, he agreed to a new performance-related deal.

In 2009–10, Bauzà was restricted to just seven appearances overall as new manager Paulo Sousa signed five new strikers in an attempt to replace Wigan Athletic-bound Jason Scotland. On 10 May 2010, he was released.

=== Later years ===
On 16 September 2010, after an unsuccessful trial at Charlton Athletic, Bauzà signed a deal with League Two club Hereford United until January 2011. He scored from a penalty kick on his debut away against Bury, two days later (1–1 draw).

On 11 March 2011, Bauzà signed a monthly contract with fellow league team Northampton Town until the end of the season. His solid displays earned him the offer of a new deal, but it was rejected.

On 15 May 2011, Bauzà joined League One side Exeter City on a free transfer as a replacement for the departing Ryan Harley. He scored in his first competitive match, a 2–0 win against Yeovil Two at St James Park in the first round of the Football League Cup.

Bauzà was released by Exeter on 30 April 2013, with manager Paul Tisdale suggesting that a lack of funding had forced him to trim the size of squad. In late October, he moved to Port Talbot Town F.C. in the Welsh Premier League.

On 11 October 2014, Bauzà returned to English league football, despite remaining in Wales, joining Southern League Division One South & West club Merthyr Town.

In July 2015, Bauzà graduated with a first class honours degree from Swansea University's College of Medicine, and discussed studying for a PhD.

== International career ==
Bauzà won the 2001 UEFA European Under-16 Championship with Spain, featuring in all six games in the tournament and sharing teams with Fernando Torres, who went on to play for the likes of Atlético Madrid, Liverpool and Chelsea. Both were also teammates at under-17 and under-19 levels.

== Career statistics ==
As of match played 26 April 2014

Appearances and goals by club, season and competition
Club	Season	League			National cup (Note: Includes FA Cup, Welsh Cup)		League cup (Note: Includes Football League Cup, Welsh League Cup)		Other		Total	
Club	Season	Division	Apps	Goals	Apps	Goals	Apps	Goals	Apps	Goals	Apps	Goals
Mallorca B	2002–03	Segunda División B	1	0	—		—		—		1	0
Mallorca B	2003–04	Segunda División B	9	0	—		—		—		9	0
Mallorca B	2004–05	Segunda División B	25	4	—		—		—		25	4
Mallorca B	Total		35	4	—		—		—		35	4
Espanyol B	2005–06	Tercera División	Data not available									
Espanyol B	2006–07	Segunda División B	31	3	—		—		—		31	3
Espanyol B	Total		31	3	—		—		—		31	3
Swansea City	2007–08	League One	28	7	5	4	2	0	5 (Note: Appearance(s) in Football League Trophy)	2	40	13
Swansea City	2008–09	Championship	15	2	3	1	3	0	0	0	21	3
Swansea City	2009–10	Championship	6	0	0	0	1	0	0	0	7	0
Swansea City	Total		49	9	8	5	6	0	5	2	68	16
Hereford United	2010–11	League Two	12	2	3	0	—		1	0	16	2
Northampton Town	2010–11	League Two	10	4	—		—		—		10	4
Exeter City	2011–12	League One	27	2	0	0	2	1	1	0	30	3
Exeter City	2012–13	League Two	19	2	0	0	1	0	1	0	21	2
Exeter City	Total		46	4	0	0	3	1	2	0	51	5
Port Talbot Town	2013–14	Welsh Premier League	7	2	0	0	0	0	—		7	2
Career total			190	28	11	5	9	1	8	2	218	36

== Honours ==
Swansea City

- Football League One: 2007–08

Merthyr Town

- Southern Football League: 2014–15

Spain U16

- UEFA European Under-16 Championship: 2001
