= 2011–12 Football League Cup =

Carling Cup, League Cup

Tournament details
- Country: England; Wales
- Dates: 29 July 2011 – 26 February 2012
- Teams: 92

Final positions
- Champions: Liverpool (8th title)
- Runners-up: Cardiff City

Tournament statistics
- Matches played: 92
- Goals scored: 305 (3.32 per match)
- Top goal scorer(s): Jay Rodriguez (5 goals)

The 2011–12 Football League Cup (known as the Carling Cup for sponsorship reasons) was the 52nd season of the Football League Cup, a knock-out competition for the top 92 football clubs played in English football league system. Birmingham City were the defending champions, but were knocked out 2–0 by Manchester City in the Third Round.

Liverpool, the winner of the competition, qualified for the third qualifying round of the 2012–13 UEFA Europa League. The final was held on 26 February 2012, and was contested at Wembley Stadium between finalists Liverpool and Cardiff City. Cardiff were the first team outside the Premier League to appear in a League Cup final since 2001. It was Liverpool's first appearance at the new Wembley. Liverpool won the final 3–2 on penalties, claiming a record eighth League Cup, after the score was 2–2 after extra time.

== Background ==
=== Broadcasting rights ===
The broadcasting rights for the 2011–12 Cup in the UK were shared between Sky Sports and the BBC. Sky Sports had rights to broadcast two live matches from each round while the BBC showed match highlights online and on a special League Cup highlights show which was broadcast in the late evening on BBC One.

The BBC showed two legs of the semi-final fixtures and Sky Sports showed the other two. Both BBC and Sky Sports simulcasted the final on 26 February 2012.

== Preliminary round ==
Times up to and including the fourth round are BST (UTC+1). Times from the quarter-finals onwards are GMT (UTC±0).

Due to newly relegated (and League Cup title holders) Birmingham City having a bye to the third round following qualification to the Europa League and the extra Europa League berth awarded to Fulham through the Fair Play league, newly promoted AFC Wimbledon and Crawley Town played each other in a preliminary round. The draw for the round took place on 13 June with Crawley Town at home. This was the first need for a Preliminary Round since the 2002–03 season.

29 July 2011	Crawley Town (4)	3–2	AFC Wimbledon (4)	Broadfield Stadium, Crawley
19:45	Akpan 38'; Torres 53'; Tubbs 64'	Report	L. Moore 26'; Midson 46'	Attendance: 3,204; Referee: Darren Deadman (Cambridgeshire)

== First round ==
The draw for the first round took place on 16 June 2011 at 10:00 BST. The First Round took place in the week commencing 8 August 2011. Rioting in London caused three matches to be postponed on the advice of the Metropolitan Police. The fixtures at West Ham United, Charlton Athletic and Crystal Palace were called off on safety grounds. The ties at Bristol City and Bristol Rovers were called off later after the disorder spread across England. The round was also notable, from a footballing perspective, for the first competitive Nottingham derby since 1994 between Nottingham Forest and rivals Notts County. The match ended 3–3, with Forest winning the subsequent penalty shoot-out 4–3.

=== Northern section ===
9 August 2011	Hartlepool United (3)	1–1 (a.e.t.) (3–4 p)	Sheffield United (3)	Victoria Park, Hartlepool
19:30	Sweeney 80'	Report	Quinn 29'	Attendance: 2,774; Referee: Paul Tierney
	Penalties
	Horwood (penalty scored); Poole (penalty scored); Collins (penalty missed); Austin (penalty scored); Nish (penalty missed)		(penalty scored) Cresswell; (penalty scored) Collins; (penalty missed) Quinn; (penalty scored) Lowton; (penalty scored) Philliskirk

9 August 2011	Rochdale (3)	3–2 (a.e.t.)	Chesterfield (3)	Spotland, Rochdale
19:45	Grimes 19', 111'; Mattis 103' (o.g.)	Report	Whitaker 11', 95' (pen.)	Attendance: 1,718; Referee: Scott Mathieson

9 August 2011	Port Vale (4)	2–4	Huddersfield Town (3)	Vale Park, Stoke-on-Trent
19:45	Roberts 24'; Loft 83' (pen.)	Report	Novak 29', 38'; Hunt 58'; Roberts 67'	Attendance: 3,014; Referee: Rob Jones

9 August 2011	Rotherham United (4)	1–4	Leicester City (2)	Don Valley Stadium, Sheffield
19:45	Mills 13' (o.g.)	Report	Gallagher 36'; Schlupp 53', 63', 71'	Attendance: 3,717; Referee: Steve Rushton

9 August 2011	Hull City (2)	0–2	Macclesfield Town (4)	KC Stadium, Kingston upon Hull
19:45		Report	Sinclair 17', 59'	Attendance: 4,826; Referee: Bobby Madley

9 August 2011	Leeds United (2)	3–2	Bradford City (4)	Elland Road, Leeds
19:45	Núñez 46', 75'; McCormack 70'	Report	Compton 30'; Flynn 57'	Attendance: 17,667; Referee: Colin Webster

9 August 2011	Doncaster Rovers (2)	3–0	Tranmere Rovers (3)	Keepmoat Stadium, Doncaster
19:45	Brown 5' (pen.); Mason 29'; Bennett 59'	Report		Attendance: 4,339; Referee: Garry Sutton

9 August 2011	Walsall (3)	0–3	Middlesbrough (2)	Banks's Stadium, Walsall
19:45	Chambers (red card) 12'	Report	Emnes 17', 37', 52' (pen.)	Attendance: 3,564; Referee: Darren Deadman

9 August 2011	Barnsley (2)	0–2	Morecambe (4)	Oakwell, Barnsley
19:45		Report	Carlton 49'; Ellison 86'	Attendance: 4,331; Referee: Mark Brown

9 August 2011	Accrington Stanley (4)	0–2	Scunthorpe United (3)	Crown Ground, Accrington
19:45		Report	Dagnall 82' (pen.); Barcham 90+3'	Attendance: 1,356; Referee: Oliver Langford

9 August 2011	Derby County (2)	2–3	Shrewsbury Town (4)	Pride Park, Derby
19:45	Maguire 46'; Robinson 78'	Report	Morgan 16', 37'; Collins 34'	Attendance: 7,073; Referee: Darren Drysdale

9 August 2011	Oldham Athletic (3)	1–1 (a.e.t.) (2–4 p)	Carlisle United (3)	Boundary Park, Oldham
19:45	Reid 24' (pen.)	Report	McGovern 57'	Attendance: 1,786; Referee: Mark Haywood
	Penalties
	Furman (penalty scored); Smith (penalty scored); Taylor (penalty missed); Parker (penalty missed)		(penalty scored) McGovern; (penalty scored) Welsh; (penalty missed) Robson; (penalty scored) Berrett; (penalty scored) Loy

9 August 2011	Bury (3)	3–1	Coventry City (2)	Gigg Lane, Bury
19:45	Bishop 33'; Lowe 75', 88'	Report	O'Donovan 26'	Attendance: 2,997; Referee: Jock Waugh

9 August 2011	Burnley (2)	6–3 (a.e.t.)	Burton Albion (4)	Turf Moor, Burnley
19:45	Rodriguez 57' (pen.), 66' (pen.), 93', 106'; Austin 83'; Wallace 91'	Report	Taylor 72'; Zola 85'; Maghoma 90+2'	Attendance: 4,069; Referee: Craig Pawson

9 August 2011	Preston North End (3)	3–2	Crewe Alexandra (4)	Deepdale, Preston
19:45	Tootle 3' (o.g.); Mellor 84'; Hume 90'	Report	Miller 18'; Artell 40'	Attendance: 5,445; Referee: David Webb

9 August 2011	Nottingham Forest (2)	3–3 (a.e.t.) (4–3 p)	Notts County (3)	City Ground, Nottingham
19:45	McGugan 30'; Findley 56'; Morgan 120+3'	Report	Edwards 16'; Westcarr 76'; Hughes 98'	Attendance: 21,605; Referee: Nigel Miller
	Penalties
	Greening (penalty missed); Tudgay (penalty scored); Garner (penalty scored); Findley (penalty scored); Boateng (penalty missed); Chambers (penalty scored)		(penalty scored) Westcarr; (penalty scored) Hawley; (penalty missed) Bencherif; (penalty scored) Sheehan; (penalty missed) Hughes; (penalty missed) Bishop

11 August 2011	Sheffield Wednesday (3)	0–0 (a.e.t.) (4–2 p)	Blackpool (2)	Hillsborough, Sheffield
19:45		Report	Eastham (red card) 78'	Attendance: 5,240; Referee: Eddie Ilderton
	Penalties
	Palmer (penalty scored); Otsemobor (penalty scored); Morrison (penalty scored); O'Connor (penalty scored)		(penalty missed) Clarke; (penalty missed) Eardley; (penalty scored) Sylvestre; (penalty scored) Llera

=== Southern section ===
9 August 2011	Brighton & Hove Albion (2)	1–0	Gillingham (4)	Falmer Stadium, Falmer
19:45	Barnes 67' (pen.)	Report		Attendance: 16,295; Referee: Brendan Malone

9 August 2011	AFC Bournemouth (3)	5–0	Dagenham & Redbridge (4)	Dean Court, Bournemouth
19:45	Pugh 32'; Cooper 35'; Feeney 57'; Taylor 88', 90+3'	Report		Attendance: 3,681; Referee: Danny McDermid

9 August 2011	Ipswich Town (2)	1–2	Northampton Town (4)	Portman Road, Ipswich
19:45	Emmanuel-Thomas 11'	Report	Tozer 39'; Turnbull 54'	Attendance: 9,401; Referee: Michael Naylor

9 August 2011	Cheltenham Town (4)	1–4	Milton Keynes Dons (3)	Abbey Business Stadium, Cheltenham
19:45	Summerfield 29'	Report	Baldock 41'; Ibehre 46'; Lewington 61'; Balanta 64'	Attendance: 1,625; Referee: James Linnington

9 August 2011	Plymouth Argyle (4)	0–1	Millwall (2)	Home Park, Plymouth
19:45		Report	N'Guessan 14'	Attendance: 4,781; Referee: Keith Stroud

9 August 2011	Southampton (2)	4–1	Torquay United (4)	St Mary's, Southampton
19:45	De Ridder 16'; Lambert 27'; Chaplow 81'; Forte 90+3'	Report	Mansell 17'	Attendance: 6,541; Referee: Dave Phillips

9 August 2011	Portsmouth (2)	0–1	Barnet (4)	Fratton Park, Portsmouth
19:45		Report	Hughes 30'	Attendance: 4,464; Referee: Darren Sheldrake

9 August 2011	Stevenage (3)	3–4 (a.e.t.)	Peterborough United (2)	Lamex Stadium, Stevenage
19:45	Long 32'; Bostwick 80'; Beardsley 117'	Report	Ball 16', 65'; Boyd 96'; Tomlin 120+1' (pen.)	Attendance: 2,414; Referee: Graham Salisbury

9 August 2011	Southend United (4)	1–1 (a.e.t.) (3–4 p)	Leyton Orient (3)	Roots Hall, Southend-on-Sea
19:45	Phillips 32'	Report	Richardson 23'; Téhoué (red card) 60'	Attendance: 4,847; Referee: Fred Graham
	Penalties
	Dickinson (penalty missed); Harris (penalty scored); Clohessy (penalty scored); Kalala (penalty missed); Hall (penalty scored)		(penalty scored) Omozusi; (penalty scored) Daniels; (penalty scored) Chorley; (penalty missed) Richardson; (penalty scored) Cureton

9 August 2011	Wycombe Wanderers (3)	3–3 (a.e.t.) (5–4 p)	Colchester United (3)	Adams Park, High Wycombe
19:45	Donnelly 2'; Grant 12'; Beavon 105'	Report	Odejayi 27'; Henderson 41'; Gillespie 98' (pen.)	Attendance: 1,430; Referee: Pat Miller
	Penalties
	Sandell (penalty scored); McCoy (penalty scored); Beavon (penalty scored); Rendell (penalty scored); Harding (penalty scored)		(penalty scored) Gillespie; (penalty scored) Wordsworth; (penalty scored) Henderson; (penalty scored) James; (penalty missed) Rose

9 August 2011	Hereford United (4)	1–0	Brentford (3)	Edgar Street, Hereford
19:45	Arquin 90+2'	Report		Attendance: 1,767; Referee: Phil Gibbs

9 August 2011	Exeter City (3)	2–0	Yeovil Town (3)	St James Park, Exeter
19:45	Bauzà 63'; Shephard 90+4'	Report		Attendance: 3,856; Referee: Roger East

10 August 2011	Oxford United (4)	1–3 (a.e.t.)	Cardiff City (2)	Kassam Stadium, Oxford
19:45	Clist 30'	Report	Conway 12'; Whittingham 98'; Jarvis 120+1'	Attendance: 5,435; Referee: Andy D'Urso

23 August 2011	Crystal Palace (2)	2–0	Crawley Town (4)	Selhurst Park, London
19:30	Zaha 54', 58'	Report		Attendance: 8,901; Referee: Michael Naylor

23 August 2011	Bristol Rovers (4)	1–1 (a.e.t.) (4–2 p)	Watford (2)	Memorial Stadium, Bristol
19:45	Harrold 5'	Report	Sordell 2'	Attendance: 4,432; Referee: David Coote
	Penalties
	Kuffour (penalty scored); McGleish (penalty missed); Virgo (penalty scored); Brown (penalty scored); Carayol (penalty scored)		(penalty missed) Eustace; (penalty scored) Sordell; (penalty scored) Mariappa; (penalty missed) Dickinson

23 August 2011	Charlton Athletic (3)	2–1	Reading (2)	The Valley, London
19:45	Benson 25'; Euell 64'	Report	Morrison 73'	Attendance: 6,668; Referee: Dean Whitestone

24 August 2011	Bristol City (2)	0–1	Swindon Town (4)	Ashton Gate, Bristol
19:45		Report	De Vita 71'	Attendance: 7,708; Referee: Gavin Ward

24 August 2011	West Ham United (2)	1–2	Aldershot Town (4)	Upton Park, London
19:45	Stanislas 16'	Report	Guttridge 78'; Hylton 89'	Attendance: 19,879; Referee: Graham Scott

== Second round ==
The draw for the second round took place on 11 August 2011. The thirteen Premier League teams not involved in European competition entered the competition at this stage.

The second round took place in the week commencing 22 August 2011.

23 August 2011	Millwall (2)	2–0	Morecambe (4)	The Den, London
19:45	Bouazza 34'; Mkandawire 45+2'	Report		Attendance: 3,443; Referee: Darren Drysdale

23 August 2011	Bury (3)	2–4	Leicester City (2)	Gigg Lane, Bury
19:45	Jones 40'; Lowe 53'	Report	Schlupp 21'; Gallagher 70'; Dyer 77'; Danns 90+3'	Attendance: 3,779; Referee: Andy Haines

23 August 2011	AFC Bournemouth (3)	1–4	West Bromwich Albion (1)	Dean Court, Bournemouth
19:45	Lovell 48'	Report	Thomas 7'; Fortuné 42', 78'; Cox 53'	Attendance: 6,911; Referee: Roger East

23 August 2011	Aston Villa (1)	2–0	Hereford United (4)	Villa Park, Birmingham
19:45	Lichaj 80'; Delfouneso 88'	Report		Attendance: 21,058; Referee: Kevin Wright

23 August 2011	Brighton & Hove Albion (2)	1–0 (a.e.t.)	Sunderland (1)	Falmer Stadium, Falmer
19:45	Mackail-Smith 96'	Report		Attendance: 17,090; Referee: Andy D'Urso

23 August 2011	Shrewsbury Town (4)	3–1	Swansea City (1)	Greenhous Meadow, Shrewsbury
19:45	Morgan 19'; Wright 67'; Wroe 90+1'	Report	Cansdell-Sherriff 10' (o.g.)	Attendance: 4,063; Referee: Paul Tierney

23 August 2011	Norwich City (1)	0–4	Milton Keynes Dons (3)	Carrow Road, Norwich
19:45		Report	Chadwick 21', 60'; Baldock 28'; Powell 67'	Attendance: 13,009; Referee: Mark Heywood

23 August 2011	Northampton Town (4)	0–4	Wolverhampton Wanderers (1)	Sixfields Stadium, Northampton
19:45		Report	Ebanks-Blake 31', 77'; Milijaš 37'; Vokes 88'	Attendance: 5,512; Referee: Carl Boyeson

23 August 2011	Wycombe Wanderers (3)	1–4	Nottingham Forest (2)	Adams Park, High Wycombe
19:45	Benyon 66' (pen.)		Miller 3'; McGugan 6' (pen.); Findley 62'; Majewski 75'	Attendance: 2,866; Referee: Danny McDermid

23 August 2011	Burnley (2)	3–2 (a.e.t.)	Barnet (4)	Turf Moor, Burnley
19:45	Rodriguez 38'; Elliott 64'; McCann 105'	Report	Kabba 73'; Holmes 90+3'	Attendance: 4,273; Referee: Chris Sarginson

23 August 2011	Doncaster Rovers (2)	1–2	Leeds United (2)	Keepmoat Stadium, Doncaster
19:45	Hayter 2'	Report	Núñez 30', 83'	Attendance: 8,505; Referee: Mark Brown

23 August 2011	Cardiff City (2)	5–3 (a.e.t.)	Huddersfield Town (3)	Cardiff City Stadium, Cardiff
19:45	Gyepes 16'; Parkin 17'; Cowie 90+3', 117'; Conway 96'	Report	Rhodes 53', 88'; Ward 70'	Attendance: 6,829; Referee: James Linington

23 August 2011	Queens Park Rangers (1)	0–2	Rochdale (3)	Loftus Road, London
19:45		Report	Akpa Akpro 5'; Jones 81'	Attendance: 4,755; Referee: Oliver Langford

24 August 2011	Peterborough United (2)	0–2	Middlesbrough (2)	London Road, Peterborough
19:45		Report	Robson 4'; Hines 27'	Attendance: 5,012; Referee: Phil Gibbs

24 August 2011	Exeter City (3)	1–3	Liverpool (1)	St James Park, Exeter
19:45	Nardiello 80' (pen.)	Report	Suárez 23'; Maxi 55'; Carroll 58'	Attendance: 8,290; Referee: Anthony Bates

24 August 2011	Blackburn Rovers (1)	3–1	Sheffield Wednesday (3)	Ewood Park, Blackburn
20:00	Rochina 3', 4'; Goodwillie 7'	Report	Morrison 50'	Attendance: 8,607; Referee: David Webb

24 August 2011	Everton (1)	3–1	Sheffield United (3)	Goodison Park, Liverpool
20:00	Cresswell 31' (o.g.); Anichebe 37'; Arteta 42'	Report	Cresswell 28'	Attendance: 17,173; Referee: Nigel Miller

24 August 2011	Bolton Wanderers (1)	2–1	Macclesfield Town (4)	Reebok Stadium, Bolton
20:00	Tuncay 56'; Petrov 73'	Report	Sinclair 11'	Attendance: 6,777; Referee: Eddie Ilderton

25 August 2011	Scunthorpe United (3)	1–2 (a.e.t.)	Newcastle United (1)	Glanford Park, Scunthorpe
19:45	Dagnall 15'	Report	Taylor 80'; Ameobi 112'	Attendance: 4,408; Referee: Graham Salisbury

30 August 2011	Aldershot Town (4)	2–0	Carlisle United (3)	EBB Stadium, Aldershot
19:45	Rankine 45+1'; Livesey 75' (o.g.)	Report		Attendance: 2,809; Referee: James Linington

30 August 2011	Swindon Town (4)	1–3	Southampton (2)	County Ground, Swindon
19:45	Kerrouche 84'	Report	Guly 17'; Forte 40'; Lambert 90+4'	Attendance: 7,452; Referee: Fred Graham

30 August 2011	Leyton Orient (3)	3–2	Bristol Rovers (4)	Brisbane Road, London
19:45	Mooney 18'; Chorley 23' (pen.); Dawson 90+4'	Report	Zebroski 69'; Richards 90+1'	Attendance: 1,881; Referee: Andy Woolmer

13 September 2011	Charlton Athletic (3)	0–2	Preston North End (3)	The Valley, London
19:45		Report	Russell 11'; Mayor 67'	Attendance: 5,130; Referee: Fred Graham

13 September 2011	Crystal Palace (2)	2–1	Wigan Athletic (1)	Selhurst Park, London
20:00	Ambrose 24'; Williams 30'	Report	Watson 90+2'	Attendance: 7,649; Referee: Keith Stroud

== Third round ==
The draw for the third round took place on 27 August 2011. The eight English clubs who qualified for European competition in the 2010–11 season – Arsenal, Birmingham City, Chelsea, Fulham, Manchester City, Manchester United, Stoke City and Tottenham Hotspur – entered the competition at this stage. Only two teams from League Two remained at this stage: Aldershot Town and Shrewsbury Town.

The Third Round took place in the week commencing 19 September 2011.

20 September 2011	Wolverhampton Wanderers (1)	5–0	Millwall (2)	Molineux, Wolverhampton
19:45	Edwards 3'; Hammill 7'; Elokobi 38'; Spray 77'; Guedioura 88'	Report		Attendance: 7,749; Referee: Kevin Wright

20 September 2011	Aldershot Town (4)	2–1	Rochdale (3)	EBB Stadium, Aldershot
19:45	Rankine 47'; Hylton 78'	Report	Grimes 45'	Attendance: 3,334; Referee: Andy D'Urso

20 September 2011	Arsenal (1)	3–1	Shrewsbury Town (4)	Emirates Stadium, London
19:45	Gibbs 33'; Oxlade-Chamberlain 58'; Benayoun 78'	Report	Collins 16'	Attendance: 46,539; Referee: Anthony Bates

20 September 2011	Burnley (2)	2–1	Milton Keynes Dons (3)	Turf Moor, Burnley
19:45	Trippier 59'; Amougou 89'	Report	Powell 6'	Attendance: 4,134; Referee: Scott Mathieson

20 September 2011	Leeds United (2)	0–3	Manchester United (1)	Elland Road, Leeds
19:45		Report	Owen 15', 32'; Giggs 45+1'	Attendance: 31,031; Referee: Mike Jones

20 September 2011	Nottingham Forest (2)	3–4 (a.e.t.)	Newcastle United (1)	City Ground, Nottingham
19:45	Findley 46'; Derbyshire 66'; Tudgay 114'	Report	Løvenkrands 39', 60' (pen.); Simpson 93'; Coloccini 120+2'	Attendance: 10,208; Referee: Lee Mason

20 September 2011	Aston Villa (1)	0–2	Bolton Wanderers (1)	Villa Park, Birmingham
19:45		Report	Eagles 54'; Kakuta 77'	Attendance: 22,261; Referee: Darren Deadman

20 September 2011	Stoke City (1)	0–0 (a.e.t.) (7–6 p)	Tottenham Hotspur (1)	Britannia Stadium, Stoke-on-Trent
19:45		Report		Attendance: 15,023; Referee: Lee Probert
	Penalties
	Walters (penalty scored); Pennant (penalty missed); Whelan (penalty scored); Wilson (penalty scored); Crouch (penalty scored); Etherington (penalty scored); Upson (penalty scored); Shotton (penalty scored)		(penalty scored) Defoe; (penalty missed) Pavlyuchenko; (penalty scored) Townsend; (penalty scored) Ćorluka; (penalty scored) Kaboul; (penalty scored) Livermore; (penalty scored) Carroll; (penalty missed) Luongo

20 September 2011	Blackburn Rovers (1)	3–2	Leyton Orient (3)	Ewood Park, Blackburn
20:00	Roberts 44' (pen.); Rochina 71'; Vukčević 75'	Report	Mooney 64'; Cox 86'	Attendance: 7,104; Referee: Colin Webster

20 September 2011	Crystal Palace (2)	2–1	Middlesbrough (2)	Selhurst Park, London
20:00	Zaha 18'; Andrew 52'	Report	Zemmama 55'	Attendance: 5,448; Referee: Graham Scott

21 September 2011	Cardiff City (2)	2–2 (a.e.t.) (7–6 p)	Leicester City (2)	Cardiff City Stadium, Cardiff
19:45	Cowie 34'; Gestede 82'	Report	Howard 40'; Dyer 66'	Attendance: 8,697; Referee: Roger East
	Penalties
	Naylor (penalty scored); Earnshaw (penalty scored); Cowie (penalty scored); Conway (penalty scored); Kiss (penalty scored); Gestede (penalty scored); Quinn (penalty scored)		Dyer (penalty scored); Howard (penalty scored); Abe (penalty scored); Danns (penalty scored); St Ledger (penalty scored); Paintsil (penalty scored); Fernandes (penalty missed)

21 September 2011	Chelsea (1)	0–0 (a.e.t.) (4–3 p)	Fulham (1)	Stamford Bridge, London
19:45		Report		Attendance: 37,632; Referee: Chris Foy
	Penalties
	Lampard (penalty missed); Luiz (penalty scored); Terry (penalty scored); Kalou (penalty scored); Malouda (penalty scored)		Zamora (penalty scored); Sidwell (penalty scored); Dembélé (penalty missed); Baird (penalty scored); Ruiz (penalty missed)

21 September 2011	Brighton & Hove Albion (2)	1–2	Liverpool (1)	Falmer Stadium, Falmer
19:45	Barnes 90' (pen.)	Report	Bellamy 7'; Kuyt 82'	Attendance: 21,897; Referee: Michael Oliver

21 September 2011	Manchester City (1)	2–0	Birmingham City (2)	Etihad Stadium, Manchester
19:45	Hargreaves 17'; Balotelli 39'	Report		Attendance: 25,070; Referee: Kevin Friend

21 September 2011	Southampton (2)	2–1	Preston North End (3)	St Mary's, Southampton
19:45	Hooiveld 27'; Lallana 66'	Report	Barton 52'	Attendance: 7,414; Referee: Simon Hooper

21 September 2011	Everton (1)	2–1 (a.e.t.)	West Bromwich Albion (1)	Goodison Park, Liverpool
20:00	Fellaini 89'; Neville 103'	Report	Brunt 57' (pen.)	Attendance: 17,647; Referee: Jonathan Moss

== Fourth round ==
The draw for the fourth round took place on 24 September 2011. Aldershot Town were the lowest ranked team remaining in the competition and the only team representing League Two at this stage. No teams from League One remained.

The Fourth Round took place in the week commencing 24 October 2011.

25 October 2011	Cardiff City (2)	1–0	Burnley (2)	Cardiff City Stadium, Cardiff
19:45	Mason 40'	Report		Attendance: 11,601; Referee: Darren Deadman

25 October 2011	Arsenal (1)	2–1	Bolton Wanderers (1)	Emirates Stadium, London
19:45	Arshavin 53'; Park 56'	Report	Muamba 47'	Attendance: 56,628; Referee: Anthony Taylor

25 October 2011	Aldershot Town (4)	0–3	Manchester United (1)	EBB Stadium, Aldershot
19:45		Report	Berbatov 15'; Owen 41'; Valencia 48'	Attendance: 7,044; Referee: Peter Walton

25 October 2011	Crystal Palace (2)	2–0	Southampton (2)	Selhurst Park, London
19:45	Ambrose 73'; Easter 82' (pen.)	Report		Attendance: 11,865; Referee: Mark Haywood

26 October 2011	Wolverhampton Wanderers (1)	2–5	Manchester City (1)	Molineux, Wolverhampton
19:45	Milijaš 18'; O'Hara 65'	Report	A. Johnson 37'; Nasri 39'; Džeko 40', 64'; De Vries 50' (o.g.)	Attendance: 12,436; Referee: Neil Swarbrick

26 October 2011	Stoke City (1)	1–2	Liverpool (1)	Britannia Stadium, Stoke-on-Trent
19:45	Jones 44'	Report	Suárez 54', 85'	Attendance: 24,934; Referee: Lee Probert

26 October 2011	Blackburn Rovers (1)	4–3 (a.e.t.)	Newcastle United (1)	Ewood Park, Blackburn
20:00	Rochina 5'; Yakubu 64' (pen.); Pedersen 99'; Givet 120'	Report	Guthrie 90+3'; Cabaye 90+6'; Løvenkrands 105+3' (pen.)	Attendance: 10,682; Referee: Bobby Madley

26 October 2011	Everton (1)	1–2 (a.e.t.)	Chelsea (1)	Goodison Park, Liverpool
20:00	Saha 83'	Report	Kalou 38'; Sturridge 116'	Attendance: 23,170; Referee: Lee Mason

== Quarter-finals ==
The draw for the quarter-finals took place on 29 October 2011. Cardiff City and Crystal Palace of the Championship were the only non-Premier League clubs left at this stage, which also saw last season's top four Premier League clubs competing.

The fifth round matches took place in the week commencing 28 November 2011.

29 November 2011	Chelsea (1)	0–2	Liverpool (1)	Stamford Bridge, London
19:45		Report	Maxi 58'; Kelly 63'	Attendance: 40,511; Referee: Phil Dowd

29 November 2011	Cardiff City (2)	2–0	Blackburn Rovers (1)	Cardiff City Stadium, Cardiff
19:45	Miller 20'; Gerrard 50'	Report		Attendance: 19,436; Referee: Martin Atkinson

29 November 2011	Arsenal (1)	0–1	Manchester City (1)	Emirates Stadium, London
20:00		Report	Agüero 83'	Attendance: 60,028; Referee: Lee Probert

30 November 2011	Manchester United (1)	1–2 (a.e.t.)	Crystal Palace (2)	Old Trafford, Manchester
19:45	Macheda 69' (pen.)	Report	Ambrose 65'; Murray 98'	Attendance: 52,624; Referee: Chris Foy

== Semi-finals ==
The draw for the semi-finals took place on 30 November 2011. Unlike the rest of the tournament, the semi-finals were played over two legs, with the aggregate score after the second leg determining the winners. In the event of the aggregate scores being level after the second legs, 30 minutes of extra time were played, with the away goals rule applied.

The first legs took place in the week commencing 9 January 2012, with the second legs a fortnight later in the week commencing 23 January 2012.

=== First leg ===
10 January 2012	Crystal Palace (2)	1–0	Cardiff City (2)	Selhurst Park, London
20:00	Gardner 43'	Report		Attendance: 22,147; Referee: Mike Dean

11 January 2012	Manchester City (1)	0–1	Liverpool (1)	Etihad Stadium, Manchester
19:45		Report	Gerrard 13' (pen.)	Attendance: 36,017; Referee: Lee Mason

=== Second leg ===
24 January 2012; 19:45 GMT	Cardiff City (2)	1–0 (a.e.t) (1–1 agg.) (3–1 p)	Crystal Palace (2)	Cardiff City Stadium, Cardiff
	Gardner 7' (o.g.)	Report		Attendance: 25,652; Referee: Howard Webb
	Penalties
	Miller (penalty missed); Conway (penalty scored); Gestede (penalty scored); Whittingham (penalty scored)		(penalty missed) Easter; (penalty missed) Scannell; (penalty scored) Jedinak; (penalty missed) Parr

Cardiff City won 3–1 on penalties.

25 January 2012; 19:45 GMT	Liverpool (1)	2–2 (3–2 agg.)	Manchester City (1)	Anfield, Liverpool
	Gerrard 41' (pen.); Bellamy 74'	Report	De Jong 31'; Džeko 67'	Attendance: 44,590; Referee: Phil Dowd

Liverpool won 3–2 on aggregate

== Final ==
The final was played on 26 February 2012 at Wembley Stadium. The final involved one team from the Premier League, Liverpool, and one from the Championship, Cardiff City. The game was won by Liverpool after a penalty shoot-out.

26 February 2012
16:00 GMT

Cardiff City (2)	2–2 (a.e.t.)	Liverpool (1)
Mason 19'; Turner 118'	Report	Škrtel 60'; Kuyt 108'
Penalties
Miller (penalty missed); Cowie (penalty scored); Gestede (penalty missed); Whittingham (penalty scored); A. Gerrard (penalty missed)	2–3	(penalty missed) S. Gerrard; (penalty missed) Adam; (penalty scored) Kuyt; (penalty scored) Downing; (penalty scored) Johnson

Wembley Stadium, London
Attendance: 89,041
Referee: Mark Clattenburg (County Durham)

== Top scorers ==
Rank	Player	Club	Goals
1	(England) Jay Rodriguez	Burnley	5
2	(Honduras) Ramón Núñez	Leeds United	4
2	(Ghana) Jeffrey Schlupp	Leicester City	4
2	(Spain) Rubén Rochina	Blackburn Rovers	4
5	(Scotland) Don Cowie	Cardiff City	3
5	(Uruguay) Luis Suárez	Liverpool	3
5	(England) Ryan Lowe	Bury	3
5	(England) Marvin Morgan	Shrewsbury Town	3
5	(England) Michael Owen	Manchester United	3
5	(England) Ashley Grimes	Rochdale	3
5	(United States) Robbie Findley	Nottingham Forest	3
5	(Ivory Coast) Wilfried Zaha	Crystal Palace	3
5	(Denmark) Peter Løvenkrands	Newcastle	3
