= Elliott Frear =

English footballer

Personal information
- Full name: Elliott Thomas Frear
- Date of birth: 11 September 1990 (age 36)
- Place of birth: Exeter, England
- Position: Winger

Youth career
- 2002–2005: Exeter City
- 2007–2009: Exeter City

Senior career*
Years	Team	Apps	(Gls)
2009–2013	Exeter City	12	(0)
2009–2010	→ Tiverton Town (loan)	29	(0)
2012–2013	→ Salisbury City (loan)	24	(3)
2013–2014	Salisbury City	43	(5)
2014–2017	Forest Green Rovers	107	(12)
2017–2019	Motherwell	60	(3)
2019–2020	Forest Green Rovers	14	(1)
2020–2021	Heart of Midlothian	8	(2)
2021–2025	Bath City	139	(11)
2025	Taunton Town	0	(0)

International career^{‡}
2013–2015	England C	6	(0)
- * Club domestic league appearances and goals as of 19:44, 6 August 2025 (UTC) ‡ National team caps and goals as of 23:43, 22 November 2014 (UTC)

Elliott Thomas Frear (born 11 September 1990) is an English professional footballer who plays as a winger.

== Career ==
Frear signed for Exeter City at the age of 11 and progressed through the club's Centre of Excellence sides, but after three seasons he was released from the club's youth system. Having spent two seasons playing local club football Frear was invited to a trial with Exeter in partnership with Exeter College and was offered a two-year placement on the College Football Academy programme. Following Frear's impressive 2008–09 season for the youth team scoring 15 goals from the left side of midfield Frear was offered a professional contract in March 2009.

In October 2009, Frear was sent out on loan to Southern League Premier Division side Tiverton Town initially on a month's loan later extended until the end of the season.

Frear made his professional début for Exeter in the FA Cup against Walsall as an 83rd-minute substitute for Daniel Nardiello in a 1–1 draw. The following week Frear made his Football League début against Yeovil Town playing the final 26 minutes in a 2–2 draw. On 23 November 2011, Frear scored his first professional goal in an FA Cup replay against Walsall having come on as a second-half substitute. Frear made his first professional start the following weekend against Tranmere Rovers in a 3–0 victory. Frear signed a new contract with Exeter City in May 2012. In late October 2012 he joined Conference South side Salisbury City on a one-month loan deal and made an immediate impact. He linked up well with the team and in late November it was announced he would remain at Salisbury for another month.

On 18 May 2013, Frear was released by Exeter City after he was not offered a new contract. He later signed at Salisbury City on a permanent basis.

On 25 June 2014, he joined Forest Green Rovers on a two-year deal. He made his debut for the club on 9 August 2014 in a 1–0 away win over Southport. He scored his first goal in a 2–2 away draw against Macclesfield Town on 4 October 2014. On 18 November 2014, he played the full 90 minutes for England C in an International Challenge Trophy fixture against the Estonia under 23s squad.

On 7 February 2015, he scored his second goal for Forest Green in a 2–1 home win over Grimsby Town. He helped the club to the Conference National play-offs for the first time in May 2015, although he could not prevent Bristol Rovers from earning a semi-final win.

On 7 November 2015, he scored Forest Green's winning goal in a stoppage time giant killing 2–1 win over Football League Two side AFC Wimbledon. He was then a part of the Forest Green side that made it through to the National League 2015–16 play-off final at Wembley Stadium on 15 May 2016, which ended in a 3–1 defeat against Grimsby Town.

On 26 January 2017, Frear signed for Scottish Premiership club Motherwell on a 2 1/2-year contract. He made his debut for Motherwell on 28 January 2017, as a substitute, against Rangers. He left the club in July 2019, having turned down the offer of a new contract.

On 18 October 2019, Frear signed for Forest Green Rovers for a second time, agreeing a short-term contract until January 2020.

On 27 August 2020, Frear signed a one-year deal with Scottish club Heart of Midlothian.

On 23 July 2021, Frear returned to England to join National League South side Bath City. At the end of the 2024–25 season, Frear left Bath City after making 171 appearances during his four seasons at the club.

In May 2025, Frear joined Southern League Premier Division South side Taunton Town. However, he left Taunton during pre-season after accepting a coaching role within private education. Later in 2025, Fear took up an elite development coach role with AF Global and Trinity School, Teignmouth, working in a private school football programme.

== Career statistics ==
As of end of 2024–25 season

Appearances and goals by club, season and competition
Club	Season	League			National Cup (Note: Appearances in FA Cup, Scottish Cup)		League Cup (Note: Appearances in EFL Cup, Scottish League Cup)		Other		Total	
Club	Season	Division	Apps	Goals	Apps	Goals	Apps	Goals	Apps	Goals	Apps	Goals
Exeter City	2009–10	League One	0	0	0	0	0	0	0	0	0	0
Exeter City	2010–11	League One	0	0	0	0	0	0	0	0	0	0
Exeter City	2011–12	League One	10	0	2	1	0	0	0	0	12	1
Exeter City	2012–13	League Two	2	0	0	0	1	0	1 (Note: Appearance(s) in Football League Trophy)	0	4	0
Exeter City	Total		12	0	2	1	1	0	1	0	16	1
Tiverton Town (loan)	2019–20	Southern League; Premier Division	29	0	0	0	—		0	0	29	0
Salisbury City (loan)	2012–13	Conference South	24	3	0	0	—		1 (Note: Appearance(s) in FA Trophy)	0	25	3
Salisbury City	2013–14	Conference Premier	43	5	3	1	—		1	0	47	6
Forest Green Rovers	2014–15	Conference Premier	42	6	2	0	—		5 (Note: Three appearances in FA Trophy, two appearances in Conference Premier play-offs)	0	52	6
Forest Green Rovers	2015–16	National League	46	5	3	1	—		3 (Note: Appearances in National League play-offs)	0	52	6
Forest Green Rovers	2016–17	National League	19	1	1	0	—		2	0	22	1
Forest Green Rovers	Total		107	12	6	1	—		10	0	123	13
Motherwell	2016–17	Scottish Premiership	15	1	0	0	0	0	—		15	1
Motherwell	2017–18	Scottish Premiership	23	1	2	0	5	2	—		30	3
Motherwell	2018–19	Scottish Premiership	22	1	1	0	6	3	—		29	4
Motherwell	Total		60	3	3	0	11	5	—		74	8
Forest Green Rovers	2019–20	League Two	14	1	1	0	0	0	0	0	15	1
Heart of Midlothian	2020–21	Scottish Championship	8	2	1 (Note: The later stages of the 2019–20 Scottish Cup were played in October and December 2020)	0	3	0	—		12	2
Bath City	2021–22	National League South	38	4	3	1	—		6 (Note: One appearance in FA Trophy, five appearances in Somerset Premier Cup)	0	47	5
Bath City	2022–23	National League South	37	1	2	0	—		6 (Note: Two appearances and one goal in FA Trophy, four appearances and one goal in Somerset Premier Cup)	2	45	3
Bath City	2023–24	National League South	32	5	3	0	—		5 (Note: Two appearances in FA Trophy, two appearances in Somerset Premier Cup, one appearances in National League South play-offs)	0	40	5
Bath City	2024–25	National League South	32	1	3	1	—		3 (Note: One appearance in FA Trophy, two appearances in Somerset Premier Cup)	0	38	2
Bath City	Total		139	11	11	2	—		21	2	171	15
Career total			436	37	27	5	15	5	34	2	512	49
