= Luke O'Brien =

English footballer

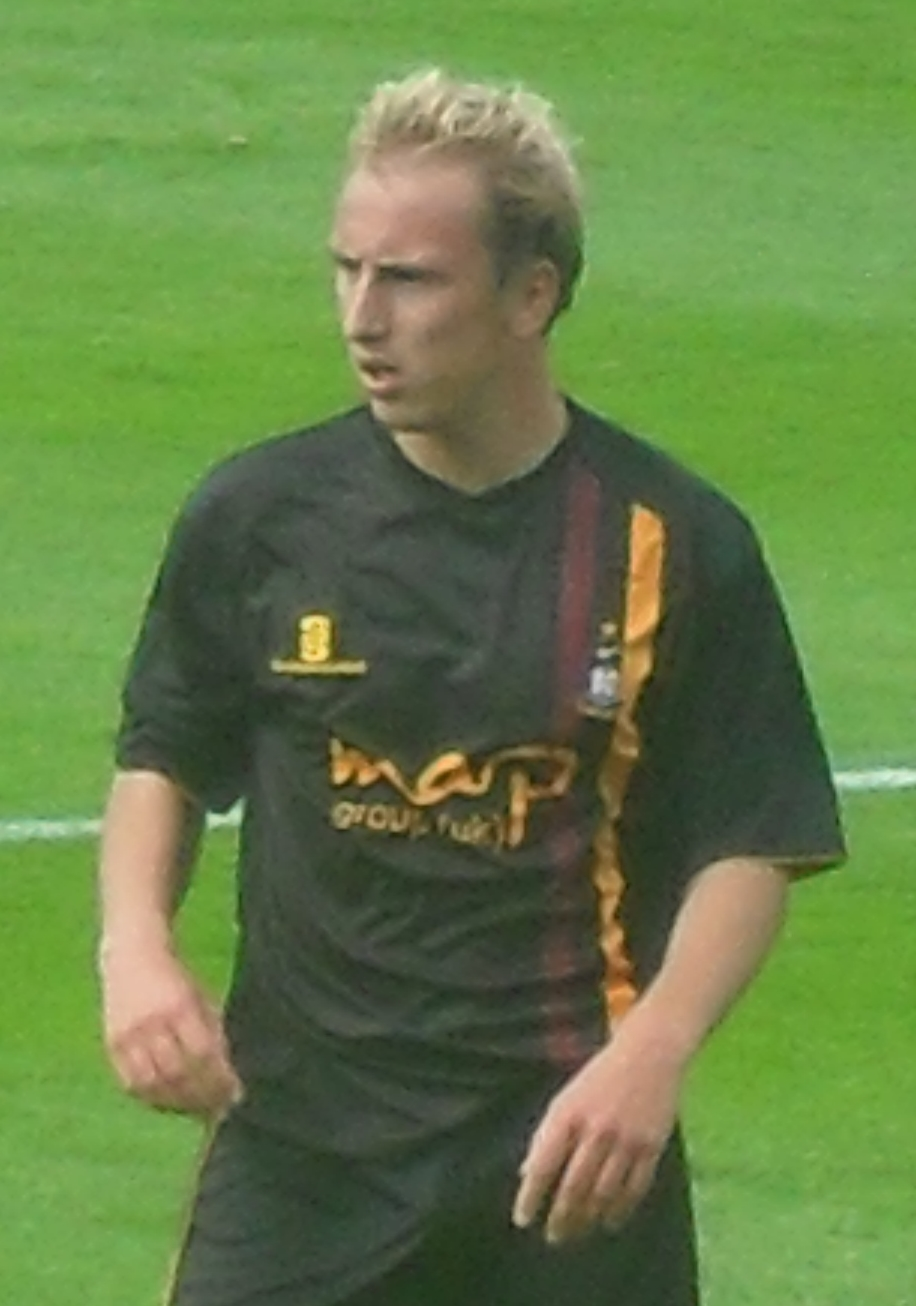
- O'Brien playing for Bradford City in 2009

Personal information
- Full name: Luke O'Brien
- Date of birth: 11 September 1988 (age 38)
- Place of birth: Halifax, England
- Height: 5 ft 8 in (1.73 m)
- Position: Left-back

Youth career
- 2005–2007: Bradford City

Senior career*
Years	Team	Apps	(Gls)
2007–2012	Bradford City	131	(2)
2012	Exeter City	3	(0)
2012–2013	Oxford United	15	(0)
2013–2014	Gateshead	9	(0)
2014	Thackley	5	(1)
2014	Bradford Park Avenue	3	(0)
2014–2016	Shaw Lane Aquaforce	59	(2)
2016	Goole AFC	8	(0)
2016–2017	Thackley	18	(1)
Total		251	(6)
- * Club domestic league appearances and goals

Luke O'Brien (born 11 September 1988) is an English retired professional footballer.

== Career ==
Born in Halifax, West Yorkshire, on 11 September 1988, O'Brien attended Holy Trinity Senior School in the town. His younger brother, Adam O'Brien, is a professional rugby league footballer with Huddersfield Giants .

O'Brien grew up as a Bradford City fan and joined the club's Centre Of Excellence when he was eight-years-old, and signed professional terms at the age of 18. He was twice awarded The David Bairstow Trophy which is given to a young player at the club (Under 8's to Under 16's) who have excelled themselves. He was also awarded the Youth Players Player of the Year aged 17. He travelled with the first team squad for the first time aged only 16. He made his debut for Bradford City as a second-half substitute against Doncaster Rovers on 4 September 2007 in the Football League Trophy. His first start came in a 3–0 FA Cup defeat to Tranmere Rovers at Valley Parade on 1 December 2007. He made his league debut towards the end of the first season when he deputised for Paul Heckingbottom in a 2–2 with Brentford on 12 April 2008. He was one of three junior players to be offered a new deal by manager Stuart McCall on 29 April 2008, and was the first of the three to sign his new deal.

He played his first game of the 2008–09 season as a second-half substitute against Luton Town, following fellow left-back Paul Heckingbottom's red card. He kept his place in the side and went on to score his first senior goal when he opened the scoring in a 2–0 victory over Rotherham United at the Don Valley Stadium on 22 November 2008. His form also helped him to win the PFA Fans' League Two player of the month in December. O'Brien said: "It is great to win an award like this, especially so early in my career, and the fact that it is voted for by supporters makes it that little bit more special." He followed it up with consecutive nominations in the following two months.

Former Bradford City player John Hendrie said O'Brien should win the club's player of the season award because of his consistency to win a regular first-team place. Hendrie said: "He defends well and has also got the energy and desire to overlap going forward and get crosses in the box." O'Brien was voted Bradford City Player of the Year, Supporters Club Player of the Year, Under 25's Player of the Year and the Alan Hannah Trophy (Players Player of the Year) for the 2008–09 season.

In May 2009, O'Brien's goal at Rotherham United was voted Goal of the Season 2008–09 by Bradford City supporters in an online poll. The left back's stunning strike back in November at the Don Valley Stadium beat seven other contenders to win the award and adds to his list of awards collected for the 2008/2009 season.

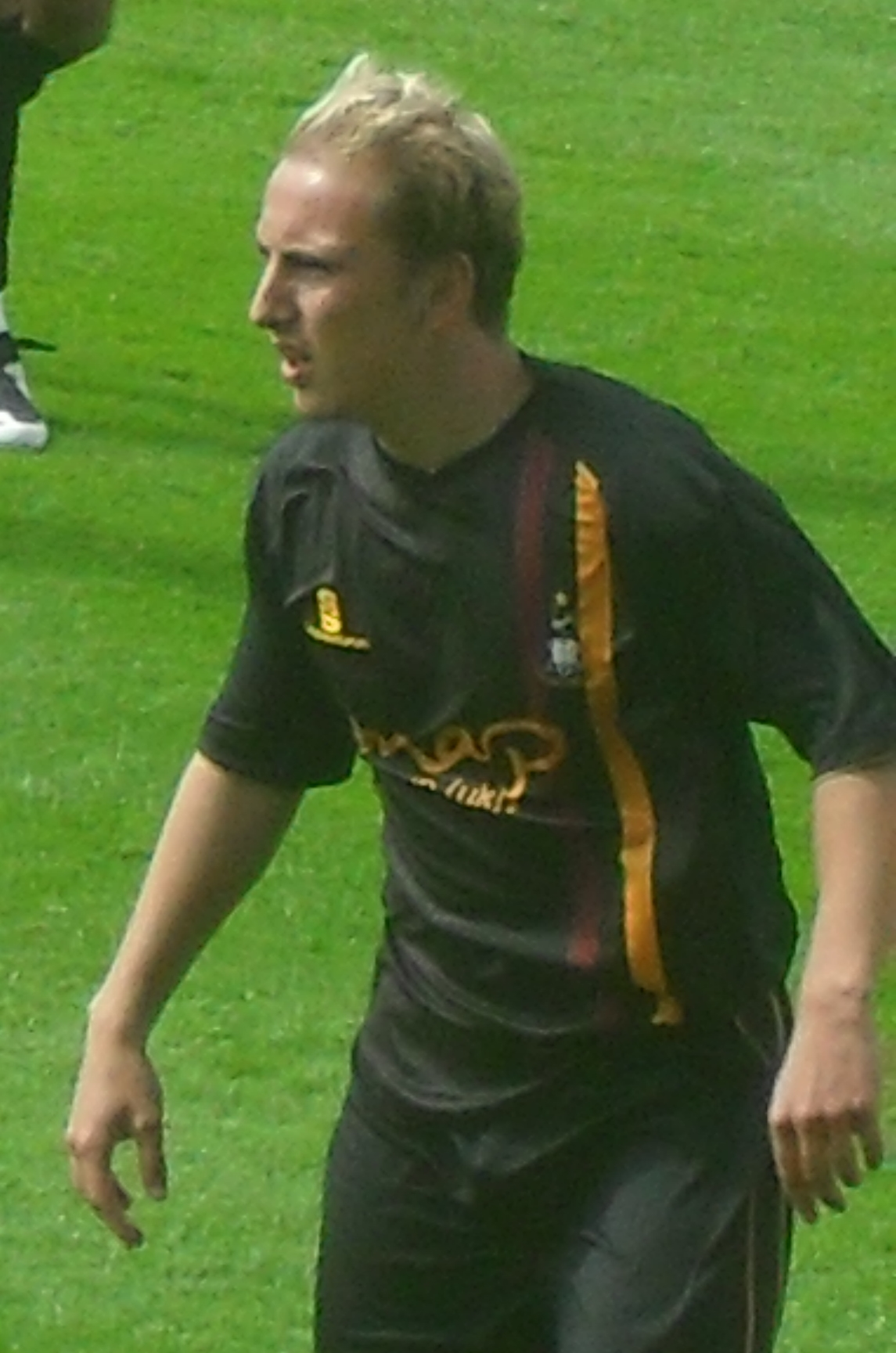
O'Brien playing for Bradford City in 2009

O'Brien's contract was due to expire at the end of the 2008–09 season. He signed a 1-year deal in June 2009 to take his contract to the end of June 2010.

The second goal of his career came against Barnet on 17 April 2010 at Valley Parade. He came on with 15 minutes remaining, scored within 4 minutes then set up Michael Flynn for the winner to give Bradford City the 2–1 result. He said "It was so special to see it go in. Ive always wanted to score like that in front of the kop.".

O'Brien appeared in 49 of the club's 2009–10 season, starting 45 and coming off the bench 4 times. In June 2010, he signed a new two-year deal, the deal also includes the option for the football club to extend his contract into a third year if they wish.

O'Brien made the most appearances in the club's 2010–11 season with a total of 46, starting 41 and coming off the bench 5 times. He also had the club's most assists in all competitions with 6.

At the start of the 2011 season, Luke did not feature under Peter Jackson. His first appearance of the season came against Sheffield Wednesday on 30 August 2011 coming on for the last 5 minutes of the game, replacing Jack Compton.

O'Brien joined League One side Exeter City on 31 January 2012 for an undisclosed fee as a direct replacement for the departed Scott Golbourne. O'Brien made 149 appearances since making his debut in September 2007 for Bradford City, he also scored 2 goals. Luke made his league debut against Stevenage at St James Park on 3 March 2012. The game finished 1–1, O'Brien played the full 90 minutes. O'Brien was released by Exeter City in May 2012.

On 14 September 2012, he signed for Oxford United.

On 22 September 2012, O'Brien made his league debut against his former club Bradford City losing 2–0 at the Kassam Stadium, he played 62 minutes, his first competitive game since 10 March.

23 January 2013, O'Brien extended his current deal to the end of the 2012–13 season.

On 7 June 2013, O'Brien signed a 1-year deal with Gateshead. He made his debut on 10 August against Kidderminster Harriers. On 29 May 2014, Luke got released and would be looking for a new club for the 2014–2015 season.

In August 2014, O'Brien signed for Northern Counties East League Premier Division side Thackley. O'Brien made his debut on 9 August in a 3–1 win against Barton Town Old Boys.

On 15 September 2014 he signed for Bradford Park Avenue on non-contract terms.

On 10 October 2014 he signed for Shaw Lane Aquaforce F.C.

On 26 August 2016 Luke signed for Goole F.C. on non-contract terms.

Just over 2 1/2 months later, on 9 November, O'Brien signed for one of his previous clubs, Thackley F.C. He played five games in his previous stint there and was happy to have signed again. He tweeted "Looking forward to the game today @ThackleyAFC ⚽, hoping to be involved at some stage in the game 👊 #dennyboys #3pointsjointtop"

== Personal life ==
O'Brien became a father for the first time on 28 February 2011, when his partner gave birth to daughter Madison. Luke's partner then gave birth to son Grayson on 30 January 2013.

== Career statistics ==
As of 15 September 2017

Appearances and goals by club, season and competition
Club	Season	League^{[A]}			FA Cup		League Cup		Other^{[B]}		Total	
Club	Season	Division	Apps	Goals	Apps	Goals	Apps	Goals	Apps	Goals	Apps	Goals
Bradford City	2007–08	League Two	2	0	1	0	0	0	1	0	4	0
Bradford City	2008–09	League Two	35	1	2	0	0	0	0	0	37	1
Bradford City	2009–10	League Two	43	1	1	0	1	0	4	0	49	1
Bradford City	2010–11	League Two	42	0	1	0	2	0	1	0	46	0
Bradford City	2011–12	League Two	9	0	1	0	0	0	3	0	13	0
Bradford City	Total		131	2	6	0	3	0	9	0	149	2
Exeter City	2011–12	League One	3	0	0	0	0	0	0	0	3	0
Oxford United	2012–13	League Two	15	0	1	0	0	0	2	0	18	0
Gateshead	2013–14	Conference Premier	9	0	0	0	0	0	0	0	9	0
Thackley	2014–15	NCEL Premier Division	5	1	1	0	0	0	0	0	6	1
Bradford Park Avenue	2014–15	Conference North	3	0	0	0	0	0	0	0	3	0
Shaw Lane Aquaforce	2014–15	NCEL Premier Division	27	2	0	0	0	0	10	0	37	2
Shaw Lane Aquaforce	2015–16	Northern Premier League Division One South	32	0	0	0	0	0	5	0	37	0
Shaw Lane Aquaforce	Total		59	2	0	0	0	0	15	0	74	2
Goole F.C.	2016–17	Northern Premier League Division One North	8	0	0	0	0	0	1	0	9	0
Thackley	2016–17	NCEL Premier Division	18	1	0	0	0	0	0	0	18	1
Career totals			251	6	8	0	3	0	27	0	289	6

A. The "League" column constitutes appearances and goals (including those as a substitute) in The Football League and Football Conference.
B. The "Other" column constitutes appearances and goals (including those as a substitute) in the Football League Trophy, FA Trophy, FA Vase and NCEL League Cup

== Honours ==
Shaw Lane Aquaforce

- NCEL Premier Division: 2014–15

Individual

- Bradford City Player of the Year: 2008–09
- Bradford City Players' Player of the Year: 2008–09
- Bradford City Young Player of the Year: 2008–09
- Bradford City Supporters' Club Player of the Year: 2008–09
- Bradford City Goal of the Season: 2008–09
