= Callum McNish =

English footballer (born 1992)

Personal information
- Full name: Callum Leander William McNish
- Date of birth: 25 May 1992 (age 34)
- Place of birth: Oxford, England
- Height: 6 ft 0 in (1.83 m)
- Position: Midfielder

Youth career
- Watford
- 2004–2009: Southampton

Senior career*
Years	Team	Apps	(Gls)
2009–2011	Southampton	1	(0)
2011–2012	Exeter City	5	(0)
2012	Braintree Town	1	(0)
2012	→ Eastleigh (loan)	6	(0)
2012–2013	Basingstoke Town	7	(0)
2013–2014	Oxford City	39	(0)
2014–2016	North Leigh	82	(25)
2016–2019	Didcot Town		
2019–2022	North Leigh	48	(9)
2022–2024	Ardley United	17	(2)
- * Club domestic league appearances and goals as of 12:17, 26 March 2026 (UTC)

Callum Leander William McNish (born 25 May 1992) is an English footballer who plays as a midfielder.

== Club career ==
McNish began his football career at Watford playing left midfield. Former Saints scout Malcolm Elias then brought Callum to the Saints Academy to play at Under 12's level and he has continued to rise through the ranks.

He was named on the substitutes bench for the first time at Nottingham Forest on the last day of the 2008–09 season, however he was an unused substitute.

He made his debut on 24 April 2010, in a 3–2 victory over Carlisle United, but was released by the club in May 2011 following the club's promotion back to The Championship.

McNish signed for Exeter City on 26 July 2011 after a successful trial which impressed manager Paul Tisdale in Exeter City's pre-season friendlies, scoring two goals. His wages to be paid by the supporters via The 1931 Fund, whose members pay a minimum subscription every month. On 6 August 2011, McNish was named in the substitutes bench in an Exeter City match against League Two promoter Stevenage which was 0–0 but McNish was not used. On 9 August 2011, McNish made his debut for the club in a 2–0 win over Yeovil Town. On 13 August 2011, McNish made his league debut for the club in a 2–0 loss against Milton Keynes Dons where he made his first start before being taken off for Tom Nichols. On 31 March 2012, McNish made a start and played 90 minutes as Exeter drew 1–1 against Colchester United and also received a first yellow card in his professional career. However, McNish struggled to break into the Exeter line-up and failed to make a breakthrough. At the end of season, Exeter City were relegated from League One after three years in English football's third tier.

McNish was released by Exeter City on 15 May 2012 after not being offered a new contract by boss Paul Tisdale. McNish made just seven appearances including two starts for Exeter City. On 4 July, he signed a one-year contract with Braintree Town.

After a spell with Conference North side Oxford City, McNish joined North Leigh in summer 2014.

In 2016, McNish moved to Didcot Town.

He returned to North Leigh in summer 2019, and he later played for Ardley United between 2022 and 2024.
