= Tom Nichols (footballer) =

English footballer (born 1993)

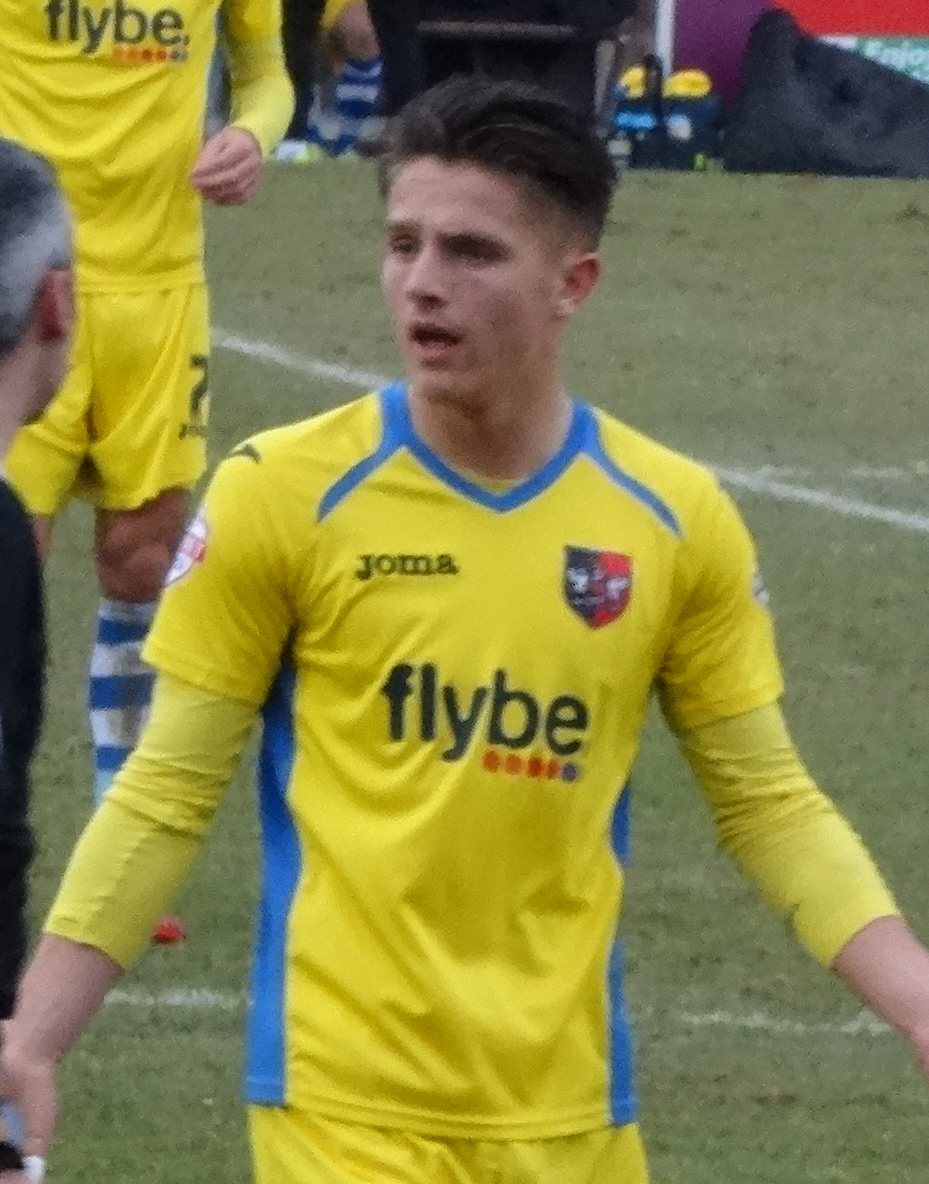
- Nichols playing for Exeter City in 2015

Personal information
- Full name: Tom Andrew Nichols
- Date of birth: 28 August 1993 (age 33)
- Place of birth: Wellington, England
- Height: 5 ft 10 in (1.78 m)
- Positions: Midfielder; striker

Team information
- Current team: Swindon Town
- Number: 7

Youth career
- 2004–2011: Exeter City

Senior career*
Years	Team	Apps	(Gls)
2011–2016	Exeter City	97	(32)
2012	→ Dorchester Town (loan)	12	(9)
2012	→ Hereford United (loan)	9	(1)
2012	→ Bath City (loan)	6	(1)
2013	→ Dorchester Town (loan)	5	(1)
2016–2017	Peterborough United	50	(11)
2017–2020	Bristol Rovers	94	(4)
2020	→ Cheltenham Town (loan)	5	(0)
2020–2022	Crawley Town	101	(23)
2023–2024	Gillingham	48	(7)
2024–2025	Mansfield Town	23	(3)
2025	→ Swindon Town (loan)	20	(2)
2025–	Swindon Town	34	(1)
- * Club domestic league appearances and goals as of 13:31, 18 March 2026 (UTC)

Tom Andrew Nichols (born 28 August 1993) is an English professional footballer who plays as a midfielder or striker for EFL League Two club Swindon Town.

Having come through Exeter City's academy, Nichols made his first-team debut for the club in May 2011. Whilst at Exeter City, he had loan spells at Dorchester Town, Hereford United and Bath City before establishing himself as a first team player in League Two. He joined Peterborough United of League One on a four-and-a-half-year contract for an undisclosed fee on 1 February 2016, but joined Bristol Rovers on a three-year contract in summer 2017. Following a loan spell at Cheltenham Town in the second half of the 2019–20 season, he was released by Bristol Rovers at the end of his three-year contract in summer 2020, and subsequently signed for League Two side Crawley Town. After two and a half years at Crawley, he transferred to fellow League Two club Gillingham for an undisclosed fee in January 2023, before moving to Mansfield Town in January 2024, again for an undisclosed fee, and was promoted to League One with them at the end of the 2023–24 season. He joined current club Swindon Town in January 2025, initially on loan, before agreeing a two-year contract in summer 2025.

== Early and personal life ==
Nichols was born in Wellington and attended Court Fields School. His father ran the King's Arms pub in Wellington. He supported Sunderland as a child.

== Career ==
=== Exeter City ===
Nichols joined Exeter City from local club Twyford Spartans as a youth at the under-11 age group. He signed his first professional contract in April 2011, aged 17. He made his professional debut on 7 May 2011, coming on as a half-time substitute for Bertrand Cozic in a 2–1 League One victory away to Sheffield Wednesday in the final match of the 2010–11 season. Nichols made his first appearance of the 2011–12 season as a 76th-minute substitute in a 2–0 League Cup win at home to Yeovil Town. He scored his first professional goal in a 2–1 victory against Chesterfield at St James Park on 27 August 2011, the eve of his 18th birthday. On 7 January 2012, it was announced that Nichols had joined Conference South side Dorchester Town on a one-month loan. He made his debut for Dorchester Town that same day in a 3–0 win over Thurrock, with Nichols scoring his first goal for the club after coming on as a substitute. In response to Nichols' debut appearance, Dorchester Town manager Alan Knight stated: "It was an encouraging performance and it was nice that he got his goal." After scoring three goals in three games for Dorchester Town, his loan was extended by a further month in February 2012. He returned to Exeter City in April 2012, having made 12 appearances and scored nine goals for the Magpies during his loan at the club. Nichols also made 12 appearances for Exeter City across the 2011–12 season, scoring one goal, as the club were relegated to League Two after finishing 23rd.

In August 2012, Nichols joined Conference side Hereford United on a one-month loan deal, stating that he was 'pleasantly surprised' that Hereford wanted to sign him. He made his debut for the Bulls on 10 August 2012 against Macclesfield Town after coming on as a substitute. He scored his first goal for the club on 18 August 2012 in a 3–0 win away to Alfreton Town. His loan deal was extended for a further month in September 2012, though Nichols was recalled from his loan later that month by his parent club. He made nine appearances and scored one goal for the Bulls. He made his first Exeter appearance of the season as a substitute in a 3–2 home league victory over Wycombe Wanderers on 18 September 2012. In November 2012, Nichols joined Conference South side Bath City on a one-month loan. After making his debut for Bath City on 1 December in a 2–2 draw with Eastbourne Borough, he made seven appearances and scored one goal for the city, prior to being recalled by Exeter City on 25 January 2013. In March 2013, Nichols re-joined Conference South side Dorchester Town on loan, where he made five appearances and scored one goal. Nichols also made three appearances without scoring for Exeter City across the 2012–13 season. At the end of the season, he was offered a new contract with Exeter City for the 2013–14 season, which he signed in July 2013.

Nichols' first appearance of the 2013–14 season came on 2 November 2013 as an 83rd-minute substitute in a 3–2 defeat away to Portsmouth. He scored his first goal of the season in his fourth appearance, with a 77th-minute equaliser in a 2–2 draw at home to Bury after coming on as a substitute. On his first start of the season in the following match on 14 December, he scored a brace in the first 11 minutes of a 3–2 win away to Accrington Stanley. After scoring his fourth goal of December from 25 yards in a 3–1 victory over Torquay United, Nichols was nominated for the League Two Player of the Month award for December 2013, but lost out to Deon Burton of Scunthorpe United. He went on to make 29 appearances and score six goals during the 2013–14 League Two season, finishing the season as City's joint top goalscorer alongside Scot Bennett.

Nichols scored the opening goal of Exeter's 2014–15 season with a 27th-minute volley in a 1–1 draw at home to Portsmouth on 9 August, but did not score again for Exeter until 26 October when he scored their second goal of a 2–0 victory away to Morecambe. He then scored five goals in his following four league matches across November 2014, leading to his nomination for the League Two Player of the Month award for that month, though it was instead given to David Worrall of Southend United. Nichols received a straight red card for kicking out at an opponent in Exeter's 1–1 draw at home to Morecambe on 28 March 2015, resulting in a three-match ban. He finished the season as the club's leading goalscorer with 15 goals in 39 appearances for the Grecians. Nichols scored Exeter's first goal of the 2015–16 season with a first-half penalty in a 3–2 win over Yeovil Town on 8 August 2015. After playing in Exeter's first and second round FA Cup victories against Didcot Town and Port Vale respectively, scoring in the former, he scored and was named the man of the match in Exeter's 2–2 draw against Premier League club Liverpool in the third round of the FA Cup on 8 January 2016. He later stated that the atmosphere was "the best I'd ever heard at St James Park". He came on as a half-time substitute in the replay on 20 January as Exeter lost 3–0 and were eliminated from the competition. He scored 12 goals in 28 games for Exeter during the 2015–16 season.

=== Peterborough United ===
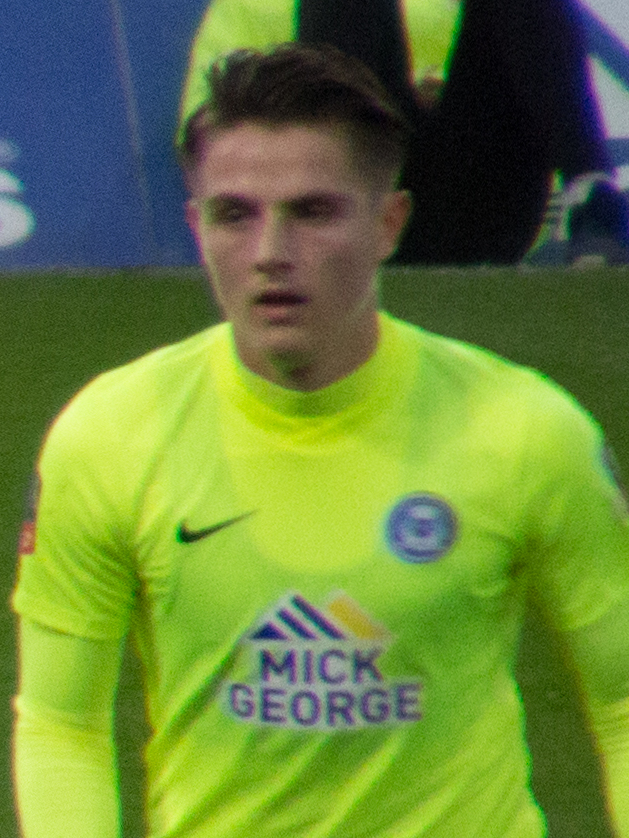
Nichols playing for Peterborough United in 2017

On 1 February 2016, Nichols joined League One side Peterborough United on a four-and-a-half-year contract for an undisclosed fee, later revealed be £352,000 including fees and add-ons. Nichols described the move as a 'no-brainer really' due to Peterborough United's record of developing younger players. He made his debut on 6 February 2016 and scored the winner with a close range shot in a 1–0 victory away to Chesterfield. He appeared in six further matches without scoring in the 2015–16 season for Peterborough. Nichols made his first appearance of the 2016–17 season as a 74th-minute substitute in a 3–2 victory away to Rochdale. He scored his first goals of the season in his following match with Peterborough's first and third goals of a 3–2 EFL Cup win over AFC Wimbledon after coming on as a substitute. He scored his first league goal of the season in the 68th-minute of a 5–1 win at home to Millwall, having already provided three assists in that match. Nichols scored for Peterborough United in a 4–1 defeat to Chelsea in the FA Cup third round on 8 January 2017, which he later described as a "career highlight". In April he suffered a medial ligament tear injury and missed the rest of the season. He scored 13 goals in 51 matches for Peterborough over the course of the 2016–17 season.

=== Bristol Rovers ===
On 17 July 2017, Nichols joined League One side Bristol Rovers for a fee of £350,000, subject to him passing a medical. Rovers initially had a bid for Nichols rejected, though Nichols requested to leave the club after he claimed his name was booed by about four Peterborough supporters prior to a friendly with Queens Park Rangers on 15 July 2017. He debuted for Bristol Rovers as a 15th-minute substitute for James Clarke in a 1–0 defeat away to Charlton Athletic, despite the hosts having a player sent off after six minutes. It took Nichols until 28 October to score his first goal for Rovers when he scored the opening goal of a 2–0 win against Milton Keynes Dons in his 19th appearance for the club. After scoring his first goal for the club, he told the Bristol Post that his goal for the club was "a big weight off the shoulders". Nichols followed up with a second goal three days later against West Ham United under-23s in the EFL Trophy. He scored 2 goals in 45 games across the 2017–18 season. Having started Bristol Rovers opening match of the 2018–19 season, he scored his first goal of the season, and first for over a year, on 21 November 2018, with Bristol Rovers' only goal of a 2–1 FA Cup defeat to Barnet. He scored his second goal of the season on 22 January 2019, converting a penalty in a 3–0 EFL Trophy win over Port Vale, before scoring his first league goal of the season the following week with the opening goal of a 2–2 League One draw with Peterborough United, again from the penalty spot. He scored 3 goals in 44 appearances across the 2018–19 season.

Nichols scored his first league goal of the 2019–20 season in a 3–1 home win against Oxford United. The striker was later on the scoresheet in an EFL Cup home tie against Brighton & Hove Albion in August, as well as an EFL Trophy match against Plymouth Argyle in September 2019. In early January 2020, he was told by new manager Ben Garner that he was free to leave the club, and subsequently signed for Cheltenham Town on a six-month loan deal on 31 January 2020. He made his debut for Cheltenham as a substitute in a 2–1 win at home to Morecambe on 1 February 2020. He scored 4 goals in 28 appearances for Bristol Rovers across the 2019–20 season, whilst he made 7 appearances for Cheltenham as they finished 4th on points per game after the season was ended early due to the COVID-19 pandemic and qualified for the play-offs, where they were eliminated by Northampton Town in the semi-final. At the end of the 2019–20 season, Nichols was released by Bristol Rovers. In an interview with Bristol Post in December 2020, Nichols stated that his time at Bristol Rovers "didn't go to plan", but that he does "look back with fondness".

=== Crawley Town ===
Following a trial spell with Swindon Town, on 7 September 2020, Nichols joined League Two club Crawley Town on a one-year deal, reuniting him with former Exeter assistant John Yems. He made his debut for Crawley as a substitute in a 2–0 away defeat to Port Vale on 12 September, and scored his first goal of the season the following match as Crawley defeated Scunthorpe United 1–0. On 8 November 2020, he scored a hat-trick as Crawley progressed to the second round of the FA Cup after defeating Torquay United 6–5 after extra time. Nichols scored a brace for Crawley in a 2–1 win away to second-placed Forest Green Rovers, attracting praise from manager Yems who said that "he [Nichols] is full of heart and determination." Having missed Crawley's FA Cup second round victory over AFC Wimbledon through injury, Nichols started the third round tie against Premier League side Leeds United and provided the assist for Crawley's second goal as they won 3–0 on 10 January 2021. Despite scoring for Crawley in the following round's tie away to AFC Bournemouth on 26 January, Crawley were eliminated from the FA Cup following a 2–1 defeat. He won the League Two Goal of the Month award for March 2021 for his goal against Tranmere Rovers on 6 March after receiving 43% of the public vote, with the goal described as a "delightful team goal". On 20 April 2021, he was shown a straight red card after elbowing Newport County defender Liam Shephard in the head in the 89th-minute of a 2–0 defeat. Having scored 15 goals in 46 appearances, Nichols was awarded Crawley Town's Player of the Year for the 2020–21 campaign. The club took up their option to extend Nichols' contract by a year.

Nichols made his first appearance of the 2021–22 season on 4 September 2021 in a 1–0 defeat to Bristol Rovers, and signed a new two-year contract with the option of a further year that day. The following match saw Nichols net his first goal for six months, "drilling the ball in" for the opening goal of a 2–1 home victory over Carlisle United. Across the 2021–22 season, he scored 10 goals in 39 league matches. After appearing 23 times and scoring 4 goals during the 2022–23 season, Nichols was left out of the matchday squad on two consecutive occasions in December 2022, leading to rumours he was to be involved in a transfer away from the club. Nichols later stated in an interview that " I got told that [Crawley] had accepted an offer for me from another club and I couldn't play any more", adding that "at the time I was not asking to leave at all".

=== Gillingham ===
On 28 December 2022, it was announced that Nichols had signed for League Two's bottom club Gillingham for an undisclosed fee, officially joining the club on 1 January 2023. The fee was rumoured to be around £60,000. He made his debut against Hartlepool United on 14 January and scored Gillingham's first goal and assisted the second in a 2–0 victory. He scored in both of his following two appearances for the Gills, and also picked up a further assist, leading to his nomination for the League Two Player of the Month award for January, but again lost out, this time to Conor McAleny. He scored a further three goals in the club's remaining 20 league matches, as Gillingham finished 17th and 12 points clear of the relegation places. During the 2023–24 season, Nichols scored thrice across 32 appearances in all competitions for Gillingham prior to leaving the club.

=== Mansfield Town ===
Nichols joined Mansfield Town on an 18-month contract for an undisclosed fee on 1 February 2024. After making his debut as an 81st-minute substitute against Notts County on 3 February, he scored on his full debut in a 4–0 win over Forest Green Rovers on 10 February. He made 16 further appearances across the 2023–24 season, scoring twice, as Mansfield were promoted to League One following a 3rd-place league finish.

=== Swindon Town ===
On 10 January 2025, Nichols joined League Two club Swindon Town on loan for the remainder of the season. At the end of the season, he agreed to join the club on a permanent two-year contract upon the expiration of his Mansfield Town contract.

Despite having been signed as an attacking player, Nichols found himself playing deeper in midfield during the early months of the 2025–26 season, notably impressing as a ball-winner.

== Style of play ==
Nichols plays as a striker, with Nichols describing himself as "the platform to play off", adding that "they play up to me and I try to hold the ball up and get the team up the pitch". Peterborough United manager Grant McCann described Nichols as a "very good footballer", going on to say that "he moves well and links up play well".

During his time with Swindon Town, Nichols found himself utilised as a midfielder.

== Career statistics ==
As of 16 January 2026

Appearances and goals by club, season and competition
Club	Season	League			FA Cup		League Cup		Other		Total	
Club	Season	Division	Apps	Goals	Apps	Goals	Apps	Goals	Apps	Goals	Apps	Goals
Exeter City	2010–11	League One	1	0	0	0	0	0	0	0	1	0
Exeter City	2011–12	League One	7	1	1	0	0	0	2 (Note: Appearance(s) in Football League Trophy)	0	10	1
Exeter City	2012–13	League Two	3	0	0	0	0	0	0	0	3	0
Exeter City	2013–14	League Two	28	6	1	0	0	0	0	0	29	6
Exeter City	2014–15	League Two	36	15	1	0	1	0	1	0	39	15
Exeter City	2015–16	League Two	22	10	4	2	1	0	1	0	28	12
Exeter City	Total		97	32	7	2	2	0	4	0	110	34
Dorchester Town (loan)	2011–12	Conference South	12	9	0	0	—		0	0	12	9
Hereford United (loan)	2012–13	Conference Premier	9	1	0	0	—		0	0	9	1
Bath City (loan)	2012–13	Conference South	6	1	0	0	—		1 (Note: Appearances in FA Trophy)	0	7	1
Dorchester Town (loan)	2012–13	Conference South	5	1	0	0	—		0	0	5	1
Peterborough United	2015–16	League One	7	1	0	0	0	0	0	0	7	1
Peterborough United	2016–17	League One	43	10	4	1	2	2	2 (Note: Appearance(s) in EFL Trophy)	0	51	13
Peterborough United	Total		50	11	4	1	2	2	2	0	58	14
Bristol Rovers	2017–18	League One	39	1	1	0	3	0	2	1	45	2
Bristol Rovers	2018–19	League One	36	1	2	1	1	0	5	1	44	3
Bristol Rovers	2019–20	League One	19	2	4	0	2	1	5	1	30	4
Bristol Rovers	Total		94	4	7	1	6	1	12	3	119	9
Cheltenham Town (loan)	2019–20	League Two	5	0	0	0	0	0	2 (Note: Appearance(s) in League Two play-offs)	0	7	0
Crawley Town	2020–21	League Two	43	11	3	4	0	0	0	0	46	15
Crawley Town	2021–22	League Two	39	10	1	0	0	0	0	0	40	10
Crawley Town	2022–23	League Two	19	2	1	0	3	2	0	0	23	4
Crawley Town	Total		101	23	5	4	3	2	0	0	109	29
Gillingham	2022–23	League Two	23	6	0	0	0	0	0	0	23	6
Gillingham	2023–24	League Two	25	1	3	1	2	1	2	0	32	3
Gillingham	Total		48	7	3	1	2	1	2	0	55	9
Mansfield Town	2023–24	League Two	18	3	0	0	0	0	0	0	18	3
Mansfield Town	2024–25	League One	5	0	0	0	1	0	2	0	8	0
Mansfield Town	Total		23	3	0	0	1	0	2	0	26	3
Swindon Town (loan)	2024–25	League Two	20	2	0	0	0	0	0	0	20	2
Swindon Town	2025–26	League Two	22	1	2	0	0	0	3	0	27	1
Swindon Town	Total		42	3	2	0	0	0	3	0	47	3
Career total			474	95	26	9	16	6	25	3	541	113

== Honours ==
Mansfield Town

- EFL League Two third–place promotion: 2023–24

Individual

- League Two Goal of the Month: March 2021
- Crawley Town Player of the Year: 2020–21
