= David Noble (footballer, born 1982) =

Scottish footballer (born 1982)

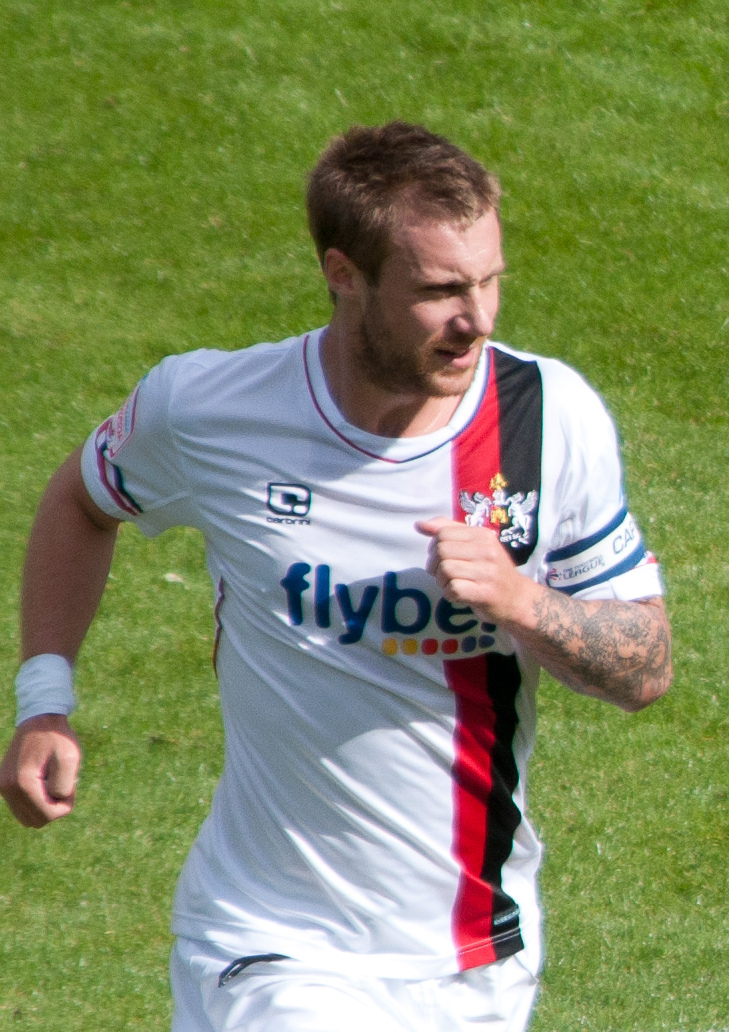
- Noble playing for Exeter City in 2010

Personal information
- Full name: David James Noble
- Date of birth: 2 February 1982 (age 44)
- Place of birth: Hitchin, England
- Position: Midfielder

Team information
- Current team: Hemel Hempstead Town (assistant manager)

Youth career
- Arsenal

Senior career*
Years	Team	Apps	(Gls)
2001–2003	Arsenal	0	(0)
2001–2002	→ Watford (loan)	15	(1)
2003–2004	West Ham United	3	(0)
2004–2006	Boston United	57	(5)
2005–2006	→ Bristol City (loan)	8	(0)
2006–2009	Bristol City	77	(7)
2009	→ Yeovil Town (loan)	2	(0)
2010–2012	Exeter City	78	(2)
2012–2014	Rotherham United	22	(3)
2013–2014	→ Cheltenham Town (loan)	29	(0)
2014–2015	Oldham Athletic	2	(0)
2014	→ Exeter City (loan)	11	(0)
2015–2016	Exeter City	34	(0)
2016–2022	St Albans City	123	(6)
Total		461	(24)

International career
1997–1999	England U16	2	(0)
2000	England U19	2	(0)
2001–2002	England U20	6	(0)
2003	Scotland U21	2	(0)
2003	Scotland B	1	(0)

Managerial career
- 2022–2024: St Albans City
- 2024: Wealdstone
- 2024: St Albans City
- * Club domestic league appearances and goals as of 09:13, 4 June 2021 (UTC)

David James Noble (born 2 February 1982) is a football manager and former player, playing as a midfielder. He is currently assistant manager at Hemel Hempstead Town.

Noble made more than 300 appearances in the Football League for Watford, West Ham United, Boston United, Bristol City, Yeovil Town, Exeter City, Rotherham United, Cheltenham Town and Oldham Athletic. Internationally, he represented his native England at levels up to under-20 before playing under-21 and B international football for Scotland.

== Club career ==
=== Arsenal ===
Noble was born in Hitchin, Hertfordshire. His career began as a trainee at Arsenal, with whom he won the FA Youth Cup in 2000. His first senior appearance was on loan at Watford in the 2001–02 season, under the management of Gianluca Vialli; where he scored once against Grimsby Town.

=== West Ham United ===
In February 2003, Noble joined newly relegated West Ham United on a free transfer, signing a deal until the end of the 2003–04 season. He made his debut in a League Cup game against Rushden & Diamonds on 13 August 2003, playing the full 90 minutes of a 3–1 win, but found chances limited and made three League appearances as substitute in August and September.

=== Boston United ===
In February 2004, Noble was loaned for a month to Boston United, after which he signed a permanent contract, initially until the end of the season.

=== Bristol City ===
In January 2006, he moved to Bristol City for £80,000, after enjoying a successful loan spell there. On 13 February 2007, he scored against Middlesbrough in the FA Cup fourth round replay, but his most important strikes were the two goals he scored against Rotherham United on 5 May which took City back into the Championship.

Noble also scored in the Championship play-off semi-final against Crystal Palace the following year, when his stoppage-time strike from 30 yards (27 m) gave Bristol City the advantage going into the second leg.

He joined Yeovil Town on loan on 25 March 2009, before being released at the end of the season.

=== Exeter City ===
On 4 January 2010, Noble signed for League One side Exeter City. Noble was named as the club's captain for the 2010–11 season. He signed a new one-year contract in June 2011. In May 2012, Noble was released by Exeter after the club was relegated.

=== Rotherham United ===
Noble signed for Rotherham United on 13 July 2012. He joined Cheltenham Town on loan in September 2013.

=== Oldham Athletic and return to Exeter City ===
Noble joined Oldham Athletic on non-contract terms in August 2014. He played twice before being released, was re-signed, and joined Exeter City on loan in September. He made 12 appearances while on loan, and then re-signed for Exeter in January 2015 until the end of the season.

=== St Albans City ===
On 28 August 2016, Noble joined St Albans City of the National League South. He signed an 18-month contract with the Saints in December 2016 and in March 2017 became the club captain. In November 2017, he also became a coach at the club.

== International career ==
Noble represented his native England at under-16, under-19, and under-20 levels. He then switched to play for Scotland. He made two appearances at under-21 level, and also played in a Scotland future team match against Turkey B on 25 February 2003.

== Coaching career ==
Following the sacking of Ian Allinson as manager of St Albans City in September 2022, Noble took on the Interim Head Coach role. On 19 November 2022, Noble was given the role on a permanent basis following a 55% win rate across his interim spell in charge. St. Albans finished the regular season in 6th place and reached the National League South play-off final, overcoming Chelmsford City and Dartford (on penalties) prior to losing 4-0 to Oxford City.

On 26 January 2024, Noble was appointed manager of National League club Wealdstone on a two-and-a-half-year deal. His contract was terminated after only 73 days, winning only three of his 17 games in charge across all competitions.

On 17 May 2024, Noble returned to St Albans City as manager. On 21 November 2024, he departed the club by mutual consent with the team sat in 21st position.

He was subsequently appointed assistant manager at National League North club Bedford Town.

In May 2026, Noble followed manager Lee Bircham from Bedford Town, joining Hemel Hempstead Town as Bircham's assistant manager.

== Career statistics ==
As of end of 2020–21 season

Appearances and goals by club, season and competition
Club	Season	League			FA Cup		League Cup		Other		Total	
Club	Season	Division	Apps	Goals	Apps	Goals	Apps	Goals	Apps	Goals	Apps	Goals
Arsenal	2001–02	Premier League	0	0	0	0	0	0	0	0	0	0
Arsenal	2002–03	Premier League	0	0	0	0	0	0	0	0	0	0
Arsenal	Total		0	0	0	0	0	0	0	0	0	0
Watford (loan)	2001–02	First Division	15	1	0	0	3	0	—		18	1
West Ham United	2003–04	First Division	3	0	0	0	1	0	—		4	0
Boston United	2003–04	Third Division	14	2	—		—		—		14	2
Boston United	2004–05	League Two	32	3	3	1	1	0	0	0	36	4
Boston United	2005–06	League Two	11	0	1	0	1	0	0	0	13	0
Boston United	Total		57	5	4	1	2	0	0	0	63	6
Bristol City	2005–06	League One	24	1	—		—		—		24	1
Bristol City	2006–07	League One	26	3	2	1	1	0	3 (Note: Appearance(s) in Football League Trophy)	0	32	4
Bristol City	2007–08	Championship	26	2	1	0	0	0	3 (Note: Appearances in Championship play-offs)	1	30	3
Bristol City	2008–09	Championship	9	1	0	0	0	0	—		9	1
Bristol City	Total		85	7	3	1	1	0	6	1	95	9
Yeovil Town (loan)	2008–09	League One	2	0	0	0	0	0	0	0	2	0
Exeter City	2010–11	League One	0	0	—		—		—		0	0
Exeter City	2010–11	League One	36	0	1	0	1	0	4	0	42	0
Exeter City	2011–12	League One	42	2	1	1	2	0	1	0	46	3
Exeter City	Total		78	2	2	1	3	0	5	0	88	3
Rotherham United	2012–13	League Two	22	3	0	0	1	0	1	0	24	3
Rotherham United	2013–14	League One	0	0	—		1	0	—		1	0
Rotherham United	Total		22	3	0	0	2	0	1	0	25	3
Cheltenham Town (loan)	2013–14	League Two	29	0	0	0	—		1	0	30	0
Oldham Athletic	2014–15	League One	2	0	—		—		—		2	0
Exeter City	2014–15	League Two	15	0	1	0	—		0	0	16	0
Exeter City	2015–16	League Two	30	0	2	0	1	0	0	0	33	0
Exeter City	Total		45	0	3	0	1	0	0	0	49	0
St Albans City	2016–17	National League South	31	2	3	0	—		2 (Note: One appearance in FA Trophy, one in Herts Charity Cup)	0	36	2
St Albans City	2017–18	National League South	38	3	2	0	—		4 (Note: Appearance(s) in FA Trophy)	1	44	4
St Albans City	2018–19	National League South	16	1	3	0	—		3 (Note: Two appearances in FA Trophy, one appearance and one goal in Herts Senior Cup)	1	22	2
St Albans City	2019–20	National League South	30	0	1	1	—		2 (Note: One appearance in FA Trophy, one in Herts Senior Cup)	0	33	1
St Albans City	2020–21	National League South	8	0	2	0	—		1	0	11	0
St Albans City	Total		123	6	11	1	—		12	2	146	9
Career total			461	24	23	4	13	0	25	3	522	31

== Honours ==
Arsenal

- FA Youth Cup: 2000

Bristol City

- Football League One second-place promotion: 2006–07

Rotherham United

- Football League Two second-place promotion: 2012–13
