= Steve Tully =

English footballer (born 1980)

Personal information
- Full name: Stephen Richard Tully
- Date of birth: 2 October 1980 (age 46)
- Place of birth: Paignton, Devon, England
- Position: Right-back

Senior career*
Years	Team	Apps	(Gls)
1997–2002	Torquay United	106	(3)
2002–2005	Weymouth	105	(8)
2005	Exeter City	2	(0)
2005–2007	Weymouth	25	(1)
2007–2013	Exeter City	221	(2)
2013	Tiverton Town		
2013–2016	Truro City		

Managerial career
- 2014–2016: Truro City (player/manager)
- 2024–2025: Poole Town
- 2026: Tavistock
- * Club domestic league appearances and goals

Stephen Richard Tully (born 10 February 1980) is an English retired footballer and manager. He was born in Paignton, Devon.

== Career ==
He began his career as a fullback with his local side Torquay United, turning professional in August 1997 and making his league debut in a 0–0 draw away to Barnet on 18 November that year. He went on to make over 160 appearances for the Gulls before being released at the end of the 2001–02 season.

He joined non-league side Weymouth in August 2002, quickly establishing himself in the side and winning the awards for Player of the Year and Away Player of the Season in 2003–2004. He lost his place in the side after the appointment of Steve Johnson as manager and asked for a transfer in January 2005.

Although he later withdrew this request, he was allowed to join Exeter City in February 2005. However, he returned to Weymouth in May that year as new manager Garry Hill's first summer signing on a two-year deal. He returned to Exeter in January 2007 and was a regular in the side that made the play-off final at the end of that season, scoring the winning penalty in the semi-final against Oxford United. On 2 July 2013 Tully was released by Exeter City.

After leaving Exeter, Tully briefly joined Tiverton Town before joining Truro City on 19 October 2013. He scored his first goal for Truro from the penalty spot in the 3–2 win at Hitchin Town on 2 November. He was appointed player-manager on 13 March 2014, at least until the end of the 2013–14 season, after the sacking of Steve Massey.

== Coaching career ==
During his time as manager of Truro City, Tully led the club to promotion to the sixth tier as well as a fourth-placed finish before departing the club at the end of the 2015–16.

Following his departure from Truro City, Tully worked with Plymouth Argyle, coaching within the club's academy whilst he continued to search for a new managerial role.

In 2022, Tully joined Bristol Rovers as Lead Professional Development Phase and under-18s manager within the club's academy. Following the appointment of Matt Taylor as first-team manager in December 2023, he was assisting the new manager on a temporary basis alongside Academy Manager Byron Anthony.

In March 2024, Tully was appointed manager of Poole Town on a contract until the end of the 2024–25 season.

On 7 January 2025, Tully stepped down as manager of Poole Town by mutual consent.

On 27 February 2026, Tully was appointed manager of Tavistock.
