= Aaron Dawson =

English footballer

Personal information
- Full name: Aaron Dawson
- Date of birth: 24 March 1992 (age 34)
- Place of birth: Exmouth, England
- Height: 5 ft 11 in (1.80 m)
- Positions: Defender; midfielder

Team information
- Current team: Vauxhall Motors

Youth career
- 2008–2010: Exeter City

Senior career*
Years	Team	Apps	(Gls)
2010–2015	Exeter City	25	(0)
2011	→ Tiverton Town (loan)	14	(4)
2012	→ Havant & Waterlooville (loan)	6	(1)
2014	→ Farnborough (loan)	5	(0)
2015	Torquay United	15	(0)
2015–2016	Truro City	31	(2)
2016–2017	Gosport Borough	50	(4)
2017–2020	Salisbury	101	(11)
2020–2022	Tiverton Town	60	(1)
2022–	Vauxhall Motors	20	(1)
- * Club domestic league appearances and goals as of 00:01, 27 October 2016 (UTC)

Aaron Dawson (born 24 March 1992) is an English footballer who plays as a defender or midfielder for Vauxhall Motors.

== Career ==
Dawson started his career in the youth team of Exeter City and signed his first professional contract in May 2010 after completing his two-year scholarship.

In September 2011, Dawson joined Southern League side Tiverton Town on a four-month loan.

He made his professional debut for Exeter City on 25 February 2012, in a 2–0 defeat to Huddersfield Town at the Galpharm Stadium.

Dawson signed for Torquay United on 26 January 2015 following his release by Exeter City.
