= Chris Shephard =

English footballer

Personal information
- Date of birth: 25 December 1988 (age 37)
- Place of birth: Exeter, England
- Positions: Winger; attacking midfielder

Team information
- Current team: Tiverton Town

Youth career
- 2005–2008: Exeter City

Senior career*
Years	Team	Apps	(Gls)
2008–2012	Exeter City	19	(1)
2010	→ Salisbury City (loan)	9	(2)
2011	→ Salisbury City (loan)	12	(2)
2012	→ Bath City (loan)	5	(1)
2012–2014	Eastbourne Borough	58	(12)
2014–2017	Weymouth	96	(25)
2017–2019	Salisbury	?	(?)
2019–	Tiverton Town	25	(5)
- * Club domestic league appearances and goals as of 20 June 2019 (UST)

Chris Shephard is an English footballer, who plays as a midfielder for Tiverton Town.

== Career ==
Shephard made his début for Exeter City, coming on as a substitute in the 89th minute, at home to Grimsby Town, in the 0–0 League Two draw on 18 October 2008. He was loaned to Salisbury City in the 2009–10 season. Shephard rejoined Salisbury City on a month-long loan deal in February 2011. He scored twice in a 4–1 win against Banbury United.

He scored his first professional goal for Exeter on 9 August 2011, against Yeovil Town in a 2–0 victory in the League Cup. In May 2012, Shephard was released by Exeter after the club was relegated from Football League One.

Shephard signed for Eastbourne Borough on 30 July 2012.

On 8 June 2019, he signed for Tiverton Town.
