= Paul Tisdale =

English association football player and manager

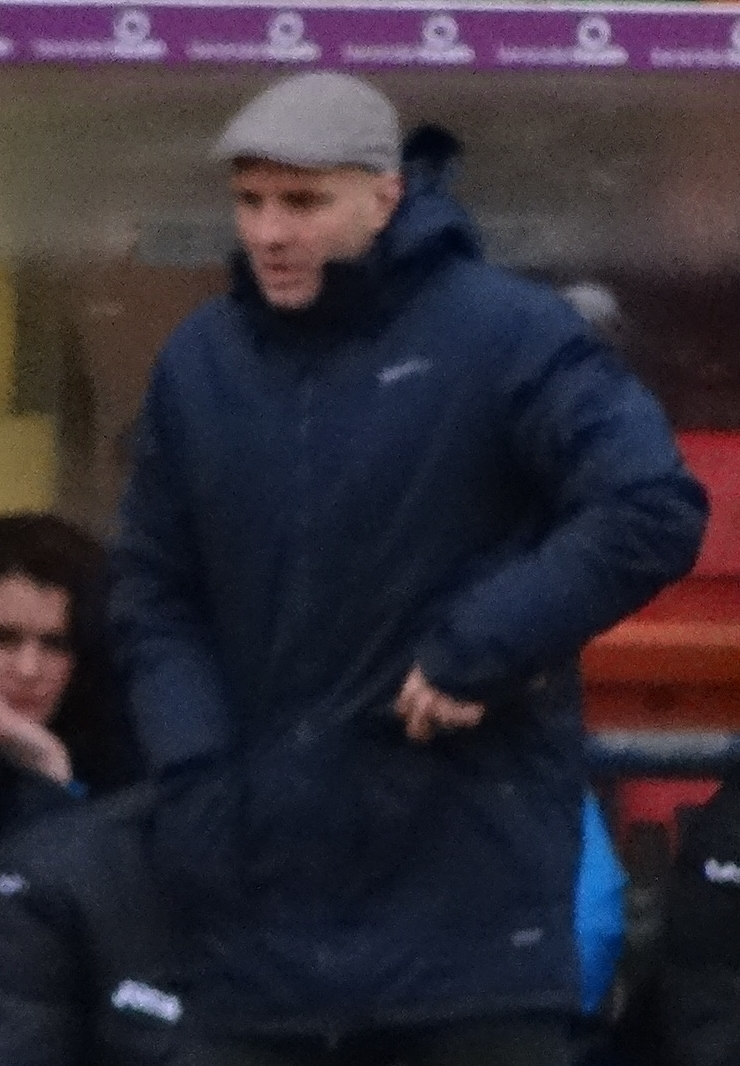
- Tisdale managing Exeter City in 2015

Personal information
- Full name: Paul Robert Tisdale
- Date of birth: 14 January 1973 (age 53)
- Place of birth: Valletta, Malta
- Height: 5 ft 9 in (1.75 m)
- Position: Midfielder

Youth career
- 1984–1987: Bristol Rovers
- 1987–1992: Southampton

Senior career*
Years	Team	Apps	(Gls)
1992–1997	Southampton	16	(1)
1993	→ Northampton Town (loan)	5	(0)
1996	→ Huddersfield Town (loan)	2	(0)
1997–1998	Bristol City	5	(0)
1997–1998	→ Exeter City (loan)	10	(1)
1998	FinnPa	8	(0)
1998–1999	Panionios	18	(1)
1999–2000	Yeovil Town	15	(1)
2010–2011	Exeter City	1	(0)
Total		80	(4)

Managerial career
- 2001–2006: Team Bath
- 2006–2018: Exeter City
- 2018–2019: Milton Keynes Dons
- 2020–2021: Bristol Rovers
- 2021–2022: Stevenage
- * Club domestic league appearances and goals

Paul Robert Tisdale (born 14 January 1973) is an English professional football manager and former player.

As a player, Tisdale represented Southampton, Bristol City, FinnPa, Panionios and Yeovil Town during a career which began in 1991 and concluded in 2000, playing primarily as a midfielder. During his time at Exeter City, he remained registered as a player between 2007 and 2016, making his debut as a late substitute in a 2–1 victory at Sheffield Wednesday at the end of the 2010–11 season and naming himself as a substitute in the EFL Trophy match at Oxford Utd on 30 August 2016.

Tisdale previously managed Team Bath. Having managed Exeter City from June 2006 until June 2018, he was, for 19 days, the longest-serving manager at one club in the English Football League.

== Playing career ==
=== Southampton ===
A former England schools international, Tisdale came through the youth system at Southampton. He signed as a professional in June 1991. He was loaned out to Northampton Town in February and March 1993, where he made five league appearances.

He eventually made his Southampton debut in a League Cup game against Huddersfield Town on 5 October 1994. Unfortunately, at this time Southampton were enduring frequent changes of manager and, as a result, Tisdale never had a settled run in the first team. Having played his last senior game for Southampton on 27 April 1996, he again went out on loan in the 1996–97 season, this time to Huddersfield Town, where he made only two appearances.

In his time at Southampton he made a total of 18 first team appearances, scoring once, against Manchester City on 16 March 1996, when he took one touch and delicately lifted the ball over goalkeeper Eike Immel. Following the departure of mentor David Merrington, Tisdale moved to Bristol City in August 1997.

=== Bristol City and abroad ===
At Bristol City his appearances were limited. It was while at Bristol City that Tisdale got his first taste of life at Exeter City, with a three-month loan at the club during the 1997–98 season. He left Ashton Gate after just one year, and played abroad for both Finnish club FinnPa and Greek club Panionios before returning to England to spend a year with Yeovil Town.

== Coaching and management ==
=== Team Bath ===
Injury forced him to end his career early, and he took a coaching role with non-league club Team Bath in 2000. Tisdale entered the University of Bath side into the 2002–03 FA Cup, becoming the first university team to enter the competition since Gonville & Caius in 1881. Team Bath entered in the preliminary round and advanced through four qualifying rounds to the first round proper, before losing to Mansfield Town. At Team Bath, Tisdale led the club through four promotions in non-league football.

=== Exeter City ===
During the summer of 2006, Tisdale left Team Bath to take up the vacant manager's position at then Conference National side Exeter City. In his first season he led the club to their first playoff finish, just missing out on promotion after losing the final 2–1 to Morecambe at Wembley Stadium on 20 May 2007.

However the following season success would soon follow, with Tisdale eventually leading the club to yet another playoff finish and ultimately promotion to the Football League following a 1–0 final victory over Cambridge United on 18 May 2008. Following promotion, Tisdale signed a new two-year rolling contract with the club in October 2008. Under his guidance the club continued their impressive form with Tisdale eventually leading the club to a second-place finish and promotion to League One, becoming the first Exeter City manager in their history to lead the club to back-to-back promotions.

The following 2009–10 season proved more of a challenge however, with the club surviving relegation from the third tier with an 18th-placed finish on the final day of the season following a 2–1 win over Huddersfield Town. Exeter City's second season in League One under Tisdale proved to be far more successful, with the club finishing in eighth place at the conclusion of the 2010–11 season – equalling the club's highest ever league finish. During the final day of the season, Tisdale – also a registered player at the club – came on as a 90th-minute substitute in a 2–1 away win over Sheffield Wednesday. The 2011–12 season however, concluded Exeter City's short stay in League One under Tisdale, with the club eventually relegated to League Two following a 23rd-place finish.

Over the following four seasons under Tisdale's management, Exeter maintained their League Two status with consecutive top-half finishes. At the end of the 2016–17 season – Tisdale's eleventh season as manager of the club – Exeter City finished in fifth place, achieving another playoff finish. After defeating Carlisle United across a two-legged semi-final, Tisdale led Exeter to Wembley once again. The final would end in disappointment however, with Blackpool defeating Exeter 2–1 on 28 May 2017.

The 2017–18 season was to be Tisdale's final season as manager of Exeter City. Once again he led the club to the playoffs after achieving a fourth-place league finish. Following victory over promotion rivals Lincoln City across two legs, Tisdale led Exeter City to a Wembley playoff final for a fourth time. Once again, the day was to end with disappointment for Tisdale and Exeter City, with Coventry City winning the tie 3–1 on 28 May 2018. On 1 June 2018, following a failure to agree a new contract, Tisdale left Exeter City after twelve years at the club. At the time of his departure, Tisdale was the longest-serving manager in English football's top four divisions.

=== Milton Keynes Dons ===
Tisdale was appointed manager of newly relegated League Two club Milton Keynes Dons on 6 June 2018 ahead of the 2018–19 season. After a near-perfect month which saw the club gain 16 points from a possible 18, he was named League Two Manager of the Month for October 2018 by the EFL for only the second time in his career. Tisdale went on to lead Milton Keynes Dons to automatic promotion back to League One at the first attempt, achieving a third-place finish.

Following a poor start to the 2019–20 season in which Milton Keynes Dons achieved only one point from a possible 27 – the worst run of results in the club's short history – Tisdale's contract with the club was mutually terminated on 2 November 2019 following a 1–3 home defeat to Tranmere Rovers.

=== Bristol Rovers ===
After a twelve-month break, Tisdale returned to football management on 19 November 2020, signing a two-and-a-half-year deal with League One club Bristol Rovers. On 10 February 2021, Tisdale departed the club after just 12 points in 15 league matches that saw Rovers only outside of the relegation zone on goal difference.

=== Colchester United ===
On 1 April 2021, Tisdale joined Colchester United in an advisory role until the end of the season, assisting inexperienced head coach Hayden Mullins as Colchester attempted to stay in the Football League.

=== Stevenage ===
Tisdale was appointed as manager of League Two club Stevenage, taking on the role on 29 November 2021. He left the club on 16 March 2022, with Stevenage having won three of his 21 matches as manager.

=== Celtic ===
On 16 October 2024, Tisdale was appointed Head of Football Operations at Scottish Premiership club Celtic. On 5 January 2026, Tisdale left the club following the sacking of Wilfried Nancy, who Tisdale helped appoint a month prior.

== Personal life ==
Born in Malta, Tisdale went to Beechen Cliff School in Bath, England, where he was childhood friends with actor Andrew Lincoln. In 2017, Lincoln said "One of my oldest and dearest friends happens to be Paul Tisdale. So I've been watching him very avidly throughout his whole career and I've been very proud of him."

Tisdale's uncle is Game of Thrones actor James Faulkner who played Randyll Tarly in the show.

His brother Peter Tisdale also played at Bath City and Team Bath, and attracted interest from Football League clubs such as Queens Park Rangers and AFC Bournemouth, before deciding on a corporate career after graduating from the University of Bath with a degree in politics and economics.

== Career statistics ==
=== Club ===
Appearances and goals by club, season and competition
Club	Season	League			FA Cup		League Cup		Other		Total	
Club	Season	Division	Apps	Goals	Apps	Goals	Apps	Goals	Apps	Goals	Apps	Goals
Southampton
Southampton	1992–93	Premier League	0	0	0	0	0	0	—		0	0
Southampton	1993–94	Premier League	0	0	0	0	0	0	—		0	0
Southampton	1994–95	Premier League	7	0	1	0	1	0	—		9	0
Southampton	1995–96	Premier League	9	1	0	0	0	0	—		9	1
Southampton	1996–97	Premier League	0	0	0	0	0	0	—		0	0
Southampton	Total		16	1	1	0	1	0	0	0	18	1
Northampton Town (loan)	1992–93	Third Division	5	0	0	0	0	0	—		5	0
Huddersfield Town (loan)	1996–97	First Division	2	0	0	0	0	0	—		2	0
Bristol City	1997–98	Second Division	5	0	1	0	2	0	—		8	0
Exeter City (loan)	1997–98	Third Division	10	1	0	0	0	0	—		10	1
FinnPa	1998	Veikkausliiga	8	0	0	0	0	0	—		8	0
Panionios	1998–99	Alpha Ethniki	18	1	0	0	0	0	2 (Note: Appearances in Cup Winners' Cup)	0	20	1
Yeovil Town	1999–2000	Conference	15	1	0	0	0	0	2 (Note: Appearances in Conference League Cup)	0	17	1
Exeter City	2010–11	League One	1	0	0	0	0	0	—		1	0
Career total			80	4	2	0	3	0	4	0	89	4

=== Managerial ===
As of match played 15 March 2022

Managerial record by team and tenure
Team	From	To	Record				
Team	From	To	P	W	D	L	Win %
Exeter City	26 June 2006	1 June 2018	626	241	159	226	38.5
Milton Keynes Dons	6 June 2018	2 November 2019	73	31	13	29	42.5
Bristol Rovers	19 November 2020	10 February 2021	19	5	3	11	26.3
Stevenage	29 November 2021	16 March 2022	21	3	8	10	14.3
Total			738	280	183	275	37.9

== Honours ==
=== As a manager ===
Team Bath

- Western Football League First Division: 2000–01
- Western Football League Premier Division: 2002–03

Exeter City

- Conference Premier play-offs: 2008
- Football League Two runners-up: 2008–09

Milton Keynes Dons

- EFL League Two third-place promotion: 2018–19

Individual

- LMA Manager of the Year: 2008–09 League Two
- EFL League Two Manager of the Month: August 2017, October 2018
