= List of Exeter City F.C. seasons =

This is a list of seasons played by Exeter City Football Club in English football, from 1908 to the present day.

== Key ==
Key to league record

- Level = Level of the league in the current league system
- Pld = Games played
- W = Games won
- D = Games drawn
- L = Games lost
- GF = Goals for
- GA = Goals against
- GD = Goals difference
- Pts = Points
- Position = Position in the final league table
- Top scorer and number of goals scored shown in bold when he was also top scorer for the division. Number of goals includes goals scored in play-offs.

Key to cup records

- Res = Final reached round
- Rec = Final club record in the form of wins-draws-losses
- PR = Preliminary round
- QR1 (2, etc.) = Qualifying Cup rounds
- G = Group stage
- R1 (2, etc.) = Proper Cup rounds
- QF = Quarter-finalists
- SF = Semi-finalists
- F = Finalists
- A (QF, SF, F) = Area quarter-, semi-, finalists
- W = Winners

== Seasons ==
List of Exeter City seasons starting since their moving to Southern Football League in 1908.

Year	League	Lvl	Pld	W	D	L	GF	GA	GD	Pts	Position	Leading league scorer		FA Cup		FL Cup		FL Trophy FA Trophy		Average home attendance (Note: Average home attendance = for league games only)
Year	League	Lvl	Pld	W	D	L	GF	GA	GD	Pts	Position	Name	Goals	Res	Rec	Res	Rec	Res	Rec	Average home attendance
1908–09	**Southern Football League**; **Division One**		40	18	6	16	56	65	-9	42	**6th of 21**			R2	3–1–1					
1909–10	**Southern Football League**; **Division One**		42	14	6	22	60	69	-9	34	**18th of 22**			QR5	0–2–1					
1910–11	**Southern Football League**; **Division One**		38	14	9	15	51	53	-2	37	**13th of 20**			R1	1–0–1					
1911–12	**Southern Football League**; **Division One**		38	11	11	16	48	62	-14	33	**15th of 20**									
1912–13	**Southern Football League**; **Division One**		38	18	8	12	48	44	+4	44	**7th of 20**									
1913–14	**Southern Football League**; **Division One**		38	10	16	12	39	38	+1	36	**12th of 20**			R2	1–0–1					
1914–15	**Southern Football League**; **Division One**		38	15	8	15	50	41	+9	38	**11th of 20**			R1	0–0–1					
No competitive football was played between 1915 and 1919 due to the World War I.
1919–20	**Southern Football League**; **Division One**		42	17	9	16	57	51	+6	43	**10th of 22**			QR6	0–0–1					
Football League Third Division created. The club were invited to join.
1920–21	**Football League**; **Third Division**	3	42	10	15	17	39	54	-15	35	**19th of 22**			R1	0–0–1					7,050
1921–22	**Football League**; **Third Division South**	3	42	11	12	19	38	59	-21	34	**21st of 22**			QR5	0–1–1					5,810
1922–23	**Football League**; **Third Division South**	3	42	13	7	22	47	84	-37	33	**20th of 22**			QR5	0–0–1					5,935
1923–24	**Football League**; **Third Division South**	3	42	15	7	20	37	52	-15	37	**16th of 22**			R2	4–2–1					5,680
1924–25	**Football League**; **Third Division South**	3	42	19	9	14	59	48	+11	47	**7th of 22**			R1	2–2–1					6,630
1925–26	**Football League**; **Third Division South**	3	42	15	5	22	72	70	+2	35	**20th of 22**			R1	0–0–1					6,334
1926–27	**Football League**; **Third Division South**	3	42	15	10	17	76	73	+3	40	**12th of 22**			R3	2–0–1					7,201
1927–28	**Football League**; **Third Division South**	3	42	17	12	13	70	60	+10	46	**8th of 22**			R4	3–2–1					6,876
1928–29	**Football League**; **Third Division South**	3	42	9	11	22	67	88	-21	29	**21st of 22**			R3	2–1–1					5,743
1929–30	**Football League**; **Third Division South**	3	42	12	11	19	67	73	-6	35	**16th of 22**			R1	0–0–1					6,592
1930–31	**Football League**; **Third Division South**	3	42	17	8	17	84	90	-6	42	**13th of 22**			QF	5–2–1					4,950
1931–32	**Football League**; **Third Division South**	3	42	20	7	15	77	62	+15	47	**7th of 22**			R3	0–0–1					6,257
1932–33	**Football League**; **Third Division South**	3	42	24	10	8	88	48	+40	58	**2nd of 22**			R1	0–1–1					7,665
1933–34	**Football League**; **Third Division South**	3	42	16	11	15	68	57	+11	43	**9th of 22**			R1	0–0–1					5,916
1934–35	**Football League**; **Third Division South**	3	42	16	9	17	70	75	-5	41	**11th of 22**			R2	1–1–1					5,009
1935–36	**Football League**; **Third Division South**	3	42	8	11	23	59	93	-34	27	**22nd of 22**			R1	0–0–1					5,214
1936–37	**Football League**; **Third Division South**	3	42	10	12	20	59	88	-29	32	**21st of 22**			R5	4–0–1					5,423
1937–38	**Football League**; **Third Division South**	3	42	13	12	17	57	70	-13	38	**17th of 22**			R2	1–0–1					6,245
1938–39	**Football League**; **Third Division South**	3	42	13	14	15	65	82	-17	40	**14th of 22**			R1	0–0–1					6,055
No competitive football was played between 1939 and 1946 due to the World War II.
1946–47	**Football League**; **Third Division South**	3	42	15	9	18	60	69	-9	39	**15th of 22**			R1	0–0–1					8,888
1947–48	**Football League**; **Third Division South**	3	42	15	11	16	55	63	-8	41	**11th of 22**			R1	0–1–1					9,900
1948–49	**Football League**; **Third Division South**	3	42	15	10	17	63	76	-13	40	**12th of 22**			R3	2–0–1					10,143
1949–50	**Football League**; **Third Division South**	3	42	14	11	17	63	75	-12	39	**16th of 22**			R4	3–0–1					10,117
1950–51	**Football League**; **Third Division South**	3	46	18	6	22	62	85	-23	42	**14th of 24**			R4	3–2–1					9,772
1951–52	**Football League**; **Third Division South**	3	46	13	9	24	65	86	-21	35	**23rd of 24**			R2	1–0–1					8,321
1952–53	**Football League**; **Third Division South**	3	46	13	14	19	61	71	-10	40	**17th of 24**			R1	0–0–1					10,339
1953–54	**Football League**; **Third Division South**	3	46	20	8	18	68	58	+10	48	**9th of 24**			R1	0–1–1					9,334
1954–55	**Football League**; **Third Division South**	3	46	11	15	20	47	73	-26	37	**22nd of 24**			R1	0–0–1					8,045
1955–56	**Football League**; **Third Division South**	3	46	15	10	21	58	77	-19	40	**16th of 24**			R3	2–1–1					8,168
1956–57	**Football League**; **Third Division South**	3	46	12	13	21	61	79	-18	37	**21st of 24**			R1	0–0–1					6,765
1957–58	**Football League**; **Third Division South**	3	46	11	9	26	57	99	-42	31	**24th of 24**			R1	0–0–1					7,784
Regional Third divisions merged creating nationwide Third Division and Fourth Division. Club has not qualified to join Third Division.
1958–59	**Football League**; **Fourth Division**	4	46	23	11	12	87	61	+26	57	**5th of 24**			R1	0–0–1					9,374
1959–60	**Football League**; **Fourth Division**	4	46	19	11	16	80	70	+10	49	**9th of 24**			R3	2–0–1					7,421
1960–61	**Football League**; **Fourth Division**	4	46	14	10	22	66	94	-28	38	**21st of 24**			R1	0-1-1	R1	0-1-1			4,961
1961–62	**Football League**; **Fourth Division**	4	44	13	11	20	62	77	-15	37	**18th of 23**			R1	0-1-1	R1	0-0-1			4,344
1962–63	**Football League**; **Fourth Division**	4	46	16	10	20	57	77	-20	42	**17th of 24**			R1	0-0-1	R1	0-0-1			4,414
1963–64	**Football League**; **Fourth Division**	4	46	20	18	8	62	37	+25	58	**4th of 24**; Promoted			R2	1-0-1	R2	1-0-1			7,291
1964–65	**Football League**; **Third Division**	3	46	12	17	17	51	52	-1	41	**17th of 24**			R2	1-0-1	R2	1-0-1			6,460
1965–66	**Football League**; **Third Division**	3	46	12	11	23	53	79	-26	35	**22nd of 24**; Relegated			R1	0-0-1	R1	0-0-1			5,590
1966–67	**Football League**; **Fourth Division**	4	46	14	15	17	50	60	-10	43	**14th of 24**			R1	0-1-1	R3	2-1-1			3,990
1967–68	**Football League**; **Fourth Division**	4	46	11	16	19	45	65	-20	38	**20th of 24**			R2	1-2-1	R1	0-1-1			3,855
1968–69	**Football League**; **Fourth Division**	4	46	16	11	19	66	65	+1	43	**17th of 24**			R3	2-1-1	R3	2-2-1			5,371
1969–70	**Football League**; **Fourth Division**	4	46	14	11	21	57	59	-2	39	**18th of 24**			R2	1-2-1	R1	0-1-1			4,918
1970–71	**Football League**; **Fourth Division**	4	46	17	14	15	67	68	-1	48	**9th of 24**			R1	0-0-1	R1	0-1-1			4,687
1971–72	**Football League**; **Fourth Division**	4	46	16	11	19	61	68	-7	43	**15th of 24**			R2	1-2-1	R1	0-0-1			3,857
1972–73	**Football League**; **Fourth Division**	4	46	18	14	14	57	51	+6	50	**8th of 24**			R1	0-0-1	R1	0-0-1			4,966
1973–74	**Football League**; **Fourth Division**	4	45	18	8	19	58	55	+3	44	**10th of 24**			R1	0-0-1	R4	3-1-1			4,193
1974–75	**Football League**; **Fourth Division**	4	46	19	11	16	60	63	-3	49	**9th of 24**			R1	0-0-1	R2	1-0-1			3,430
1975–76	**Football League**; **Fourth Division**	4	46	18	14	14	56	47	+9	50	**7th of 24**			R1	0-0-1	R2	1-2-1			3,265
1976–77	**Football League**; **Fourth Division**	4	46	25	12	9	70	46	+24	62	**2nd of 24**; Promoted			R1	0-1-1	R2	2-0-1			4,616
1977–78	**Football League**; **Third Division**	3	46	15	14	17	49	59	-10	44	**17th of 24**			R3	2-2-1	R2	1-2-1			4,880
1978–79	**Football League**; **Third Division**	3	46	17	15	14	61	56	+5	49	**9th of 24**			R2	1-0-1	R4	3-1-1			4,412
1979–80	**Football League**; **Third Division**	3	46	19	10	17	60	68	-8	48	**8th of 24**			R1	0-0-1	R4	4-0-2			4,579
1980–81	**Football League**; **Third Division**	3	46	16	13	17	62	66	-4	45	**11th of 24**			QF	5-2-1	R1	0-2-0			4,555
1981–82	**Football League**; **Third Division**	3	46	16	9	21	71	84	-13	57	**18th of 24**			R1	0-0-1	R2	1-0-3			3,862
1982–83	**Football League**; **Third Division**	3	46	14	12	20	81	104	-23	54	**19th of 24**			R1	0-0-1	R1	0-0-2			3,244
1983–84	**Football League**; **Third Division**	3	46	6	15	25	50	84	-34	33	**24th of 24**; Relegated			R1	0-1-1	R1	0-0-2	AQF	1-0-2	3,377
1984–85	**Football League**; **Fourth Division**	4	46	13	14	19	57	79	-22	53	**18th of 24**			R1	0-1-1	R1	1-0-1	R1	0-1-1	2,351
1985–86	**Football League**; **Fourth Division**	4	46	13	15	18	47	59	-12	54	**21st of 24**			R3	2-0-1	R2	1-0-3	G	0-1-1	1,973
1986–87	**Football League**; **Fourth Division**	4	46	11	23	12	53	49	+4	56	**14th of 24**			R1	0-1-1	R1	0-1-1	R1	0-2-1	2,657
1987–88	**Football League**; **Fourth Division**	4	46	11	13	22	53	68	-15	46	**22nd of 24**			R1	0-0-1	R1	0-1-1	G	0-0-2	2,465
1988–89	**Football League**; **Fourth Division**	4	46	18	6	22	65	68	-3	60	**13th of 24**			R1	0-0-1	R1	0-0-2	R1	0-1-1	2,667
1989–90	**Football League**; **Fourth Division**	4	46	28	5	13	83	48	+35	89	**1st of 24**; Promoted			R3	2-3-1	R4	3-2-2	AQF	2-0-2	4,859
1990–91	**Football League**; **Third Division**	3	46	16	9	21	58	52	+6	57	**16th of 24**			R1	0-0-1	R1	0-1-1	AQF	2-1-1	4,285
1991–92	**Football League**; **Third Division**	3	46	14	11	21	57	80	-23	53	**20th of 24**			R3	1-3-1	R1	0-0-2	AQF	2-0-2	3,645
Football League divisions renamed after the Premier League creation.
1992–93	**Football League**; **Second Division**	3	46	11	17	18	54	69	-15	50	**19th of 24**			R2	1-0-1	R2	1-2-1	AF	3-3-1	3,268
1993–94	**Football League**; **Second Division**	3	46	11	12	23	52	83	-31	45	**22nd of 24**; Relegated			R3	1-2-1	R2	1-1-2	R2	1-0-2	3,349
1994–95	**Football League**; **Third Division**	4	46	8	10	24	36	70	-34	34	**22nd of 22**			R2	1-0-1	R1	0-1-1	AQF	2-1-1	2,482
1995–96	**Football League**; **Third Division**	4	46	13	18	15	46	53	-7	57	**14th of 24**			R1	0-0-1	R1	0-2-0	G	0-1-1	3,442
1996–97	**Football League**; **Third Division**	4	46	12	12	22	48	73	-25	48	**22nd of 24**	Darran Rowbotham	9	R2	1-0-1	R1	0-0-2	AQF	0-1-1	3,014
1997–98	**Football League**; **Third Division**	4	46	15	15	16	68	63	+5	60	**15th of 24**	Darran Rowbotham	21	R1	0-1-1	R1	0-0-2	R2	0-0-1	3,990
1998–99	**Football League**; **Third Division**	4	46	17	12	17	47	50	-3	63	**12th of 24**	Steve Flack	11	R2	1-2-1	R1	0-1-1	AQF	1-1-0	3,154
1999–2000	**Football League**; **Third Division**	4	46	11	11	24	46	72	-26	44	**21st of 24**	Gary Alexander	16	R3	2-1-1	R1	0-0-2	AF	3-1-1	3,014
2000–01	**Football League**; **Third Division**	4	46	12	14	20	40	58	-18	50	**19th of 24**	Steve Flack	13	R1	0-0-1	R1	0-1-1	R1	0-0-1	3,692
2001–02	**Football League**; **Third Division**	4	46	14	13	19	48	73	-25	55	**16th of 24**	Christian Roberts	11	R2	1-1-1	R1	0-0-1	R1	0-0-1	3,443
2002–03	**Football League**; **Third Division**	4	46	11	15	20	50	64	-14	48	**23rd of 24**; Relegated	Steve Flack	13	R3	2-1-1	R1	0-0-1	R2	1-0-1	3,763
2003–04	**Conference**; **Premier**	5	42	19	12	11	71	57	+14	69	**6th of 22**	Sean Devine	20	QR4	0-2-0			R1 (FLT); QF (FAT)	0-0-1; 3-0-1	3,665
2004–05	**Conference**; **Premier**	5	42	20	11	11	71	50	+21	71	**6th of 22**	Steve Flack	12	R3	2-1-1			R2 (FLT); QF (FAT)	0-1-1; 3-1-1	3,389
2005–06	**Conference**; **Premier**	5	42	18	9	15	65	48	+17	63	**7th of 24**	Lee Phillips	13	QR4	0-0-1			R1 (FLT); SF (FAT)	0-0-1; 5-0-1	3,790
2006–07	**Conference**; **Premier**	5	46	22	12	12	67	48	+19	78	**5th of 24**	Billy Jones	10	R1	1-0-1			R2	1-0-1	3,627
2006–07	**Conference**; **Premier**	5	Lost in the play-off final.											R1	1-0-1			R2	1-0-1	3,627
2007–08	**Conference**; **Premier**	5	46	22	17	7	83	58	+25	83	**4th of 24**	Richard Logan	18	R2	2-0-1			R2	1-0-1	3,705
2007–08	**Conference**; **Premier**	5	Promoted after winning the play-offs.											R2	2-0-1			R2	1-0-1	3,705
2008–09	**Football**; **League Two**	4	46	22	13	11	65	50	+15	79	**2nd of 24**; Promoted	Adam Stansfield	10	R1	0-0-1	R1	0-0-1	R1	0-0-1	4,939
**2009–10**	**Football**; **League One**	3	46	11	18	17	48	60	-12	51	**18th of 24**	Ryan Harley	10	R2	1-0-1	R1	0-0-1	R2	0-1-0	5,832
**2010–11**	**Football**; **League One**	3	46	20	10	16	66	71	-5	70	**8th of 24**	Jamie Cureton	17	R1	0-0-1	R1	0-0-1	AF	3-2-1	5,393
**2011–12**	**Football**; **League One**	3	46	10	12	24	46	75	-29	42	**23rd of 24**; Relegated	Daniel Nardiello	9	R1	0-1-1	R2	1-0-1	R2	0-1-1	4,474
**2012–13**	**Football**; **League Two**	4	46	18	10	18	63	62	+1	64	**10th of 24**	Jamie Cureton	21	R1	0-0-1	R1	0-0-1	R1	0-1-0	4,142
**2013–14**	**Football**; **League Two**	4	46	14	13	19	54	57	-3	55	**16th of 24**	Alan Gow	7	R1	0-0-1	R1	0-0-1	R1	0-0-1	3,701
**2014–15**	**Football**; **League Two**	4	46	17	13	16	61	65	-4	64	**10th of 24**	Tom Nichols	15	R1	0-0-1	R1	0-0-1	R2	0-0-1	3,873
**2015–16**	**Football**; **League Two**	4	46	17	13	16	63	65	-2	64	**14th of 24**	Tom Nichols; Jayden Stockley	10	R3	2-1-1	R2	1-0-1	R2	1-0-1	4,008
**2016–17**	**Football**; **League Two**	4	46	21	8	17	75	56	-19	71	**5th of 24**	David Wheeler	17	R1	0-0-1	R2	1-0-1	G	1-1-1	4,166
**2016–17**	**Football**; **League Two**	4	Lost in the play-off final.											R1	0-0-1	R2	1-0-1	G	1-1-1	4,166
**2017–18**	**Football**; **League Two**	4	46	24	8	14	64	54	+10	80	**4th of 24**	Jayden Stockley	19	R3	2-1-1	R1	0-0-1	G	0-1-2	4,037
**2017–18**	**Football**; **League Two**	4	Lost in the play-off final.											R3	2-1-1	R1	0-0-1	G	0-1-2	4,037
**2018–19**	**Football**; **League Two**	4	46	19	13	14	60	49	+11	70	**9th of 24**	Jayden Stockley	16	R1	0-0-1	R2	0-1-1	R2	2-1-1	4,418
**2019–20**	**Football**; **League Two**	4	37	18	11	8	53	43	+10	65	**5th of 24**	Ryan Bowman	14	R2	1-2-1	R1	0-0-1	SF	5-1-1	4,847
**2019–20**	**Football**; **League Two**	4	Lost in the play-off final.											R2	1-2-1	R1	0-0-1	SF	5-1-1	4,847
**2020–21**	**Football**; **League Two**	4	46	18	16	12	71	50	+21	70	**9th of 24**	Matt Jay	18	R3	2-0-1	R1	0-0-1	R1	3-0-1	
**2021–22**	**Football**; **League Two**	4	46	23	15	8	65	41	+24	84	**2nd of 24**; Promoted	Matt Jay	14	R2	1-1-1	R1	0-1-0	R2	1-1-2	5,312
**2022–23**	**Football**; **League One**	3	46	15	11	20	64	68	-4	56	**14th of 24**	Sam Nombe	15	R2	1-0-1	R2	1-1-0	GS	1-0-2	6,846
**2023–24**	**Football**; **League One**	3	46	17	10	19	46	61	-15	61	**13th of 24**	Reece Cole	7	R1	0-0-1	R4	2-1-1	GS	1-0-2	6,800
**2024-25**	**Football**; **League One**	3	46	15	11	20	49	65	-16	56	**16th of 24**	Millenic Alli	9	R4	3-1-0	R1	0-1-0	R32	3-0-1	6,513
**2025-26**	**Football**; **League One**	3	46	12	13	21	52	61	-9	49	**21st of 24**; Relegated	Jayden Wareham	19	R3	2-0-1	R1	0-0-1	R32	2-0-2	6,739
