= Chasetown F.C. =

Association football club in England

Chasetown
- Full name: Chasetown Football Club
- Nicknames: The Scholars, The Chase
- Founded: 1954; 72 years ago (as Chase Terrace Old Scholars)
- Ground: The Scholars Ground, Chasetown, Burntwood
- Capacity: 3,000 (500 Seated)
- Chairman: Steve Jones
- Manager: Carl Dickinson
- League: Northern Premier League Division One West
- 2025–26: Northern Premier League Division One West, 10th of 22
- Website: www.chasetownfc.co.uk
Home colours	Away colours

Chasetown Football Club is an English football club based in the Chasetown area of Burntwood, Staffordshire. The club plays in the Northern Premier League First Division West and is nicknamed The Scholars, having been formed by affiliates of nearby Chase Terrace High School in the Chase Terrace area of Burntwood.

Chasetown gained national recognition in November 2005 when the BBC televised the club's FA Cup first round home tie with Oldham Athletic, in which the team held their Football League opponents to a 1–1 draw. They went on to finish the 2005–06 season as Midland Alliance champions and gain promotion. In the 2007–08 F.A Cup the Scholars defeated Port Vale 1–0 in a Second Round replay. In doing so, they became the lowest ranked club to reach the Third Round Proper of the FA Cup before losing to eventual finalists Cardiff City.

== History ==
Chasetown Football Club was founded in 1954 as Chase Terrace Old Scholars Youth Club by Brian Baker and schoolmaster Ray Derry. The club initially competed in the Cannock Youth League before moving to the Lichfield and District League in 1958, and then to the Staffordshire County League in 1961.

In 1972, the club adopted its current name, Chasetown FC, upon joining the West Midlands (Regional) League Division One. Under manager Larry Percival, the club won a league title, although promotion was denied due to inadequate facilities. A move to The Scholars Ground in 1983 enabled progression to the Premier Division.

Under Mervyn Rowe, Chasetown won the West Midlands League Cup (1990) and the Walsall Senior Cup (1991, 1993). His tenure also included a 36-game unbeaten league run before stepping down in 1993. Following several managerial changes, his son Michael Rowe took over in 2002, with Charlie Blakemore assuming the role in 2004.

Chasetown gained national attention during the 2005–06 FA Cup, reaching the First Round Proper for the first time and drawing against Oldham Athletic in a match broadcast live on the BBC. In 2007–08, they became the lowest-ranked side to reach the FA Cup Third Round, defeating Port Vale before losing to Cardiff City.

The club earned promotion to the Southern League in 2006 and was later transferred to the Northern Premier League. In 2010–11, Chasetown made a notable run in the FA Trophy, defeating Grimsby Town on the way to the quarter-finals.

Blakemore departed in 2011, and the club was relegated that season. Under Craig Harris, Chasetown claimed another Walsall Senior Cup in 2014. Subsequent managers included Marcus Law, Scott Dundas, and Mark Swann, who took charge in 2020.

In 2021–22, Chasetown reached the play-off final, attracting a then-record crowd of 2,500.

In 2023, upgrades to The Scholars Ground included the installation of an artificial pitch, a new 300-seat stand at the Chasewater end, a club shop, and improved spectator facilities. The 2024–25 season marked further success, with Chasetown winning the Staffordshire Senior Cup for the first time. In May 2026, they won the Walsall Senior Cup for a fifth time.

== Crest ==
Chasetown's crest features a deer, in reference to nearby Cannock Chase, and a Stafford Knot.

== Ground and supporters ==
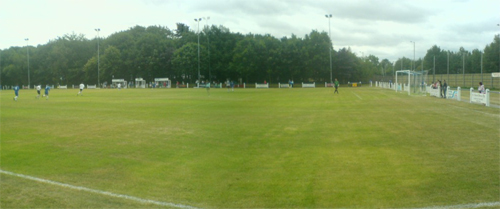
The Scholars Ground

The Scholars Ground has been Chasetown's home since 1983. The ten highest official attendances recorded at the ground for competitive fixtures are as follows:

Attendance	Opponents	Match	Date	Result
2,706	Hednesford Town	Northern Premier League West	1 January 2025	0-3
2,500	Belper Town	Northern Premier League Division One Midlands play-off final	30 April 2022	0-1
2,420	Cardiff City	FA Cup 3rd round Proper	5 January 2008	1-3
2,134	Blyth Spartans	FA Cup 4th Qualifying Round	25 October 2005	1-0
2,031	Hednesford Town	Northern Premier League West	1 January 2024	0-0
2,000	Mansfield Town	FA Trophy 4th round Proper	1 March 2011	2-2
1,997	Oldham Athletic	FA Cup 1st round Proper	6 November 2005	1-1
1,986	Port Vale	FA Cup 2nd round Proper, Replay	11 December 2007	1-0
1,842	Witton Albion	Northern Premier League West	2 December 2023	3-2
1,408	Nuneaton Borough	FA Cup 4th Qualifying Round	27 October 2007	2-1

There are four sides at The Scholars Ground. A seated stand with a clubhouse and wooden seats is the oldest of them. There are also turnstiles on this side, with another seated stand behind the goal. In November 2022, a new 350 seated stand was put in place through the clubs twenty20 lottery funds of £13,000, 5 rows of metal terracing for away fans in league and cup games after a final end running across the far side of the pitch where the dugouts are.

In December 2023, Chasetown re-opened their ground to the public after months of work on the ground, including an artificial pitch for the first time as well as brand new facilities around the ground. A then home league record crowd of 1,842 were in attendance as they watched Chasetown beat Witton Albion 3–2.

== Current squad ==
As of 23 August 2026

Note: Flags indicate national team as defined under FIFA eligibility rules; some limited exceptions apply. Players may hold more than one non-FIFA nationality.

No.	Pos.	Nation	Player
—	GK	ENG	Curtis Pond
—	GK	ENG	Oliver Shaw
—	DF	ENG	Nathan Cameron
—	DF	ENG	Jordan Evans
—	DF	ENG	Zach Findlay
—	DF	ENG	Oli Hayward
—	DF	ENG	Joel Kettle
—	DF	AUS	Leo Latter
—	DF	NIR	Ethan Patterson
—	DF	ENG	Jensen Tortoishell
—	MF	ENG	Dan Bradley
—	MF	ENG	George Cater

No.	Pos.	Nation	Player
—	MF	ENG	Logan Cousins
—	MF	ENG	Jack Langston
—	MF	FRA	Kevin Monteiro
—	MF	ENG	Takura Sambizi
—	MF	AUS	Lachlan Suffell
—	MF	ENG	Tom Thorley
—	FW	ENG	Luke Chapman
—	FW	ENG	Matt Funge
—	FW	ENG	Matt Hearsey
—	FW	ENG	Kyle Moseley
—	FW	ENG	Rafferty Winnall

== Team management ==
- Carl Dickinson - Manager
- Kris Scott - Assistant manager
- John Birt - Goalkeeping coach
- Lauren Couchman - Sports therapist
- John Hawkins - Kit manager

== Honours and records ==
- West Midlands (Regional) League Division One
  - Champions: 1978
- West Midlands (Regional) League Premier Division Cup
  - Winners: 1990, 1991
- Staffordshire Senior Cup
  - Winners: 2025
- Walsall Senior Cup
  - Winners: 1991, 1993, 2005, 2014, 2026
- Midland Football Alliance
  - Champions: 2005
  - Runners-up: 2004
- Joe McGorian Cup (Midland Football Alliance Winners vs League Cup Winners)
  - Winners: 2006
- Northern Premier League Division One South
  - Runners-up & Playoff Winners: 2010

=== National cup record ===
- Best FA Cup performance : Third Round Proper – 2007/08
- Best FA Trophy performance : Fourth round proper – 2010/2011
- Best FA Vase performance : Fifth round Proper – 1999/2000

=== Team records ===
(1972–73 onwards)

- Most league goals (season) : 94 (West Mids Div 1; 1975/76)
- Most points scored :
  - Two points for a win : 64 (West Mids Div 1, 40 Games, 1975/76)
  - Three points for a win : 94 (Midland Alliance, 42 Games, 2005/06)

=== Individual records ===
- Most goals scored (career) : Tony Dixon – 197 goals (1987–94, 1995–98)
- Most goals scored (season) : Mick Ward – 39 goals (1987–88)
- Most goals scored (match) : Keith Birch – 11 versus Lichfield Laundry (21–1)
- Highest transfer fee received : "undisclosed" amounts for Chris Slater and Kyle Perry (both Port Vale)
- Karl Edwards once scored in 10 consecutive league games – a club record
- Danny Smith was Chasetown's youngest modern day goalscorer aged 17 years and 143 days
- Chasetown became the first club from the eighth tier of the English football pyramid to reach the 3rd round of the FA Cup in the 2007–08 season followed by Marine vs Tottenham Hotspur in 2020.
