= 1998–99 Panionios F.C. season =

Panionios
1998–99 season
- Manager: Ronnie Whelan
- Alpha Ethniki: 15th
- Greek Cup: First round
- Cup Winners' Cup: Quarter-finals

During the 1998–99 Greek football season, Panionios F.C. competed in the Alpha Ethniki.

Panionios finished 15th in the league table.

== Season summary ==
Panionios reached the quarter-finals of the Cup Winners' Cup for the first time in their history, being knocked out 7-0 on aggregate by eventual champions Lazio. However, league form suffered and the club only avoided relegation on goal difference. Manager Ronnie Whelan left at the end of the season.

== First-team squad ==
Squad at end of season

Note: Flags indicate national team as defined under FIFA eligibility rules; some limited exceptions apply. Players may hold more than one non-FIFA nationality.

No.	Pos.	Nation	Player
1	GK	GRE	Giannis Fakis
2	DF	NOR	Jan Kruse
3	DF	GRE	Vasilios Kouvalis
4	DF	GRE	Athanasios Gazis
5	DF	GRE	Vasilios Ioannidis
6	MF	GRE	Dimitrios Bougas
8	MF	NOR	Lars Bakkerud
9	FW	ENG	Garry Haylock
10	MF	GRE	Antonis Sapountzis
11	MF	NOR	Kent Bergersen
12	GK	ALB	Foto Strakosha
14	DF	GRE	Spyros Zarras
16	DF	GRE	Nikolaos Makrygiannis

No.	Pos.	Nation	Player
17	FW	GRE	Dimitris Nalitzis
18	MF	GRE	Kostas Kafalis
19	DF	GRE	Georgios Mitsiopoulos
20	DF	WAL	Gareth Roberts
21	GK	GRE	Georgios Souloganis
22	MF	ROU	Edward Iordănescu
23	DF	GRE	Giannis Kamitsis
24	FW	GRE	Ilias Ioannou
25	DF	GRE	Dimitrios Markesinis
26	DF	GRE	Tasos Zachopoulos
28	MF	GRE	Theofilos Karasawidis
31	MF	MLT	Paul Tisdale
32	FW	SKN	Keith Gumbs

=== Left club during season ===
Note: Flags indicate national team as defined under FIFA eligibility rules; some limited exceptions apply. Players may hold more than one non-FIFA nationality.

No. / Pos. / Nation / Player; 7 / FW / ENG / Mark Robins (on loan to Manchester City)	No. / Pos. / Nation / Player; 20 / DF / GRE / Takis Fyssas (to Panathinaikos)

== Alpha Ethniki ==
=== League table ===
Pos	Team	Pld	W	D	L	GF	GA	GD	Pts	Qualification or relegation
13	Paniliakos	34	11	5	18	37	54	−17	38	
14	Apollon Athens	34	9	9	16	42	62	−20	36	
15	Panionios	34	9	5	20	42	58	−16	32 (Note: Head-to-head record: Panionios–Panelefsiniakos 3–0, Panelefsiniakos–Panionios 1–0.)	
16	Panelefsiniakos (R)	34	7	11	16	25	49	−24	32	Relegation to Beta Ethniki
17	Veria (R)	34	6	5	23	20	55	−35	23	Relegation to Beta Ethniki

Source: Galanis Sports Data
Rules for classification: 1st points; 2nd head-to-head points; 3rd head-to-head goal difference; 4th decision match.
(R) Relegated

=== Results summary ===
Overall								Home						Away					
Pld	W	D	L	GF	GA	GD	Pts	W	D	L	GF	GA	GD	W	D	L	GF	GA	GD
34	9	5	20	42	58	−16	32	7	2	8	25	25	0	2	3	12	17	33	−16

Last updated: 30 May 1999.
Source: Competitive matches

=== Results by round ===
Round	1	2	3	4	5	6	7	8	9	10	11	12	13	14	15	16	17	18	19	20	21	22	23	24	25	26	27	28	29	30	31	32	33	34
Ground	H	A	H	A	H	A	H	A	H	A	H	A	H	A	H	A	H	A	H	A	H	A	H	A	H	A	H	A	H	A	H	A	H	A
Result	L	L	W	L	W	W	D	L	L	W	W	L	D	L	W	L	L	L	L	D	W	L	L	L	L	L	W	L	W	D	L	D	L	L
Position	14	14	13	15	11	7	10	10	12	9	8	11	11	11	9	11	13	13	13	13	12	12	14	15	15	15	14	15	14	15	15	15	15	15

Source: Competitive matches
A = Away; H = Home; W = Win; D = Draw; L = Loss

=== Greek Cup ===
11 November 1998 First round	Panionios	1–2 (a.e.t.)	Panathinaikos	Nea Smyrni
19:45 EET	Robins 22'	Report (page 29)	Warzycha 19'; Liberopoulos 111'	Stadium: Nea Smyrni Stadium; Attendance: 1,664; Referee: Georgios Psychomanis (Athens)

== Cup Winners' Cup ==
=== First round ===
17 September 1998 First leg	Panionios (Greece)	2–0	(Finland) Haka	Athens, Greece
17:00	Haylock 36'; Robins 54'	Report		Stadium: Nea Smyrni Stadium; Attendance: 4,222; Referee: Charles Agius (Malta)

1 October 1998 Second leg	Haka (Finland)	1–3 (1–5 agg.)	(Greece) Panionios	Valkeakoski, Finland
19:00	Salli 75'	Report	Fyssas 32'; Kafalis 45'; Sapountzis 56'	Stadium: Tehtaan kenttä Attendance: 1,750; Referee: Konrad Plautz (Austria)

=== Second round ===
22 October 1998 First leg	Panionios (Greece)	3–2	(Cyprus) Apollon Limassol	Athens, Greece
17:30	Sapountzis 22'; Haylock 39'; Robins 57'	Report	Špoljarić 14', 43'	Stadium: Nea Smyrni Stadium; Attendance: 10,000; Referee: Roy Helge Olsen (Norway)

5 November 1998 Second leg	Apollon Limassol (Cyprus)	0–1 (2–4 agg.)	(Greece) Panionios	Limassol, Cyprus
18:00		Report	Sapountzis 18'	Stadium: Tsirion Stadium; Attendance: 8,000; Referee: Jan Wegereef (Netherlands)

=== Quarter-finals ===
4 March 1999 First leg	Panionios (Greece)	0–4	(Italy) Lazio	Athens, Greece
21:45		Report	Stanković 3', 60'; Gazis 14' (o.g.); Nedvěd 63'	Stadium: Nea Smyrni Stadium; Attendance: 10,175; Referee: Graham Poll (England)

18 March 1999 Second leg	Lazio (Italy)	3–0 (7–0 agg.)	(Greece) Panionios	Rome, Italy
20:45	Nedvěd 70'; Stanković 77'; de la Peña 82'	Report		Stadium: Stadio Olimpico; Attendance: 20,488; Referee: Bernd Heynemann (Germany)
