= Staffordshire Fire and Rescue Service =

Fire and rescue service for Staffordshire, England

- The Service's badge features a Stafford knot

Operational area
- Country: England
- County: Staffordshire

Agency overview
- Established: 1974
- Chief Fire Officer: Rob Barber KFSM

Facilities and equipment
- Stations: 33
- Engines: 39
- Trucks: 2
- Rescues: 1
- Rescue boats: 2

Website
- www.staffordshirefire.gov.uk

Staffordshire Fire and Rescue Service is the statutory fire and rescue service responsible for fire protection, prevention, intervention and emergency rescue in the county of Staffordshire and unitary authority of Stoke-on-Trent. The county has a population of 1,126,200 (mid-2017 estimate) and covers a total area of 2,260 km^{2} (870 square miles). Staffordshire shares the majority of its border with Derbyshire, Cheshire, West Midlands (County) and Shropshire; although, in much shorter stretches, the county also butts up against Worcestershire, Warwickshire and Leicestershire.

As of 1 August 2018, the fire service functions under the control of the Staffordshire Police and Crime Commissioner acting as the Fire & Rescue Authority.

The county provides considerable risks to its residents and firefighters. These include the industrial city of Stoke-on-Trent and the large industrial towns of Burton-upon-Trent, Stafford, Newcastle-under-Lyme, Tamworth and Cannock.

The M6 motorway runs through the county, as does the M6 Toll road. The main 'A‘ roads the A5, A50, A34 and A38 also cross the county. These well-used routes are regularly the scene of numerous road traffic accidents, vehicle fires and chemical incidents.

There are also many significant rural risks in Staffordshire: The medieval hunting grounds of Cannock Chase is designated as an Area of Outstanding Natural Beauty (AONB), and is made up of heathland, chaseland and forest that stretches between Stafford, Cannock, Rugeley and Chase Terrace. In the north of the county the Staffordshire Moorlands is an area of remote wilderness where The Pennines spill over the Derbyshire and Cheshire borders, and has an area of around 576 km^{2} (222 square miles). These areas pose a considerable risk of wildfires, and regularly keep firefighters extremely busy during hot dry spells. Also, the moorlands offer their own logistical difficulties during harsh winters, particularly to the residents of the towns and villages dotted throughout the hills - towns like Leek and Biddulph, and the villages of Ipstones and Longnor amongst others. The Staffordshire Moorlands is home to Flash, the highest village in The United Kingdom, which stands at 463 m (1,519 feet) above sea level.

== Organisation ==
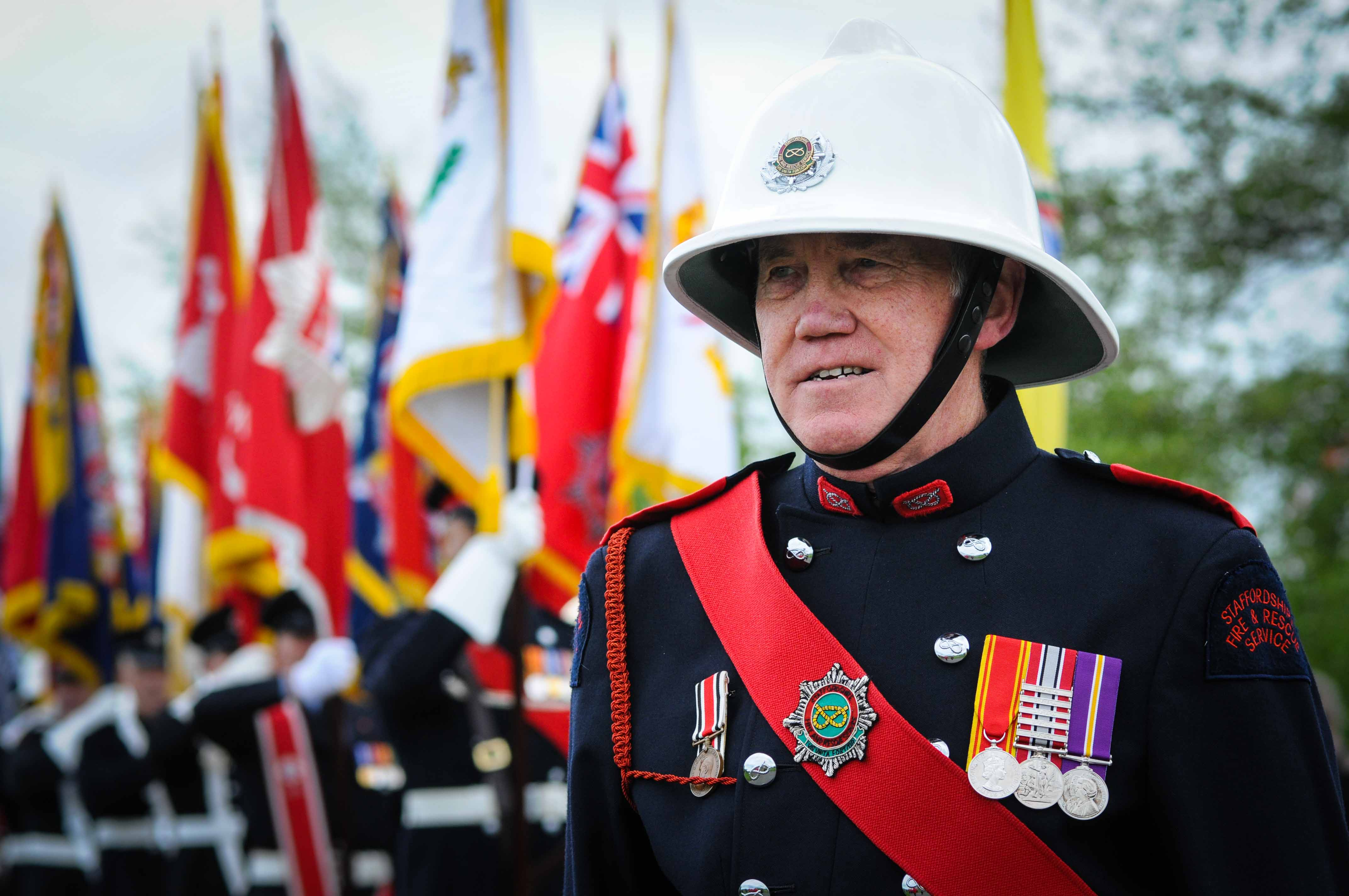
Staffordshire Fire and Rescue Service ceremonial squad

The service is run under the command of the Chief Fire Officer and an executive board, and provides emergency response from 33 strategically located fire stations, divided into three delivery groups:

- Northern
- Eastern
- Western

Staffordshire Fire and Rescue Service has its headquarters and training school at Pirehill near the town of Stone in mid-Staffordshire. Their fire control centre used to be at Pirehill, but was closed after its amalgamation with fire control of the West Midlands Fire Service in March 2014. Both brigades operate under a joint control centre situated in Birmingham. The county's maintenance workshops are located at the Joint Emergency Transport Facility in Trentham Lakes industrial park, a joint workshop with Staffordshire Police.

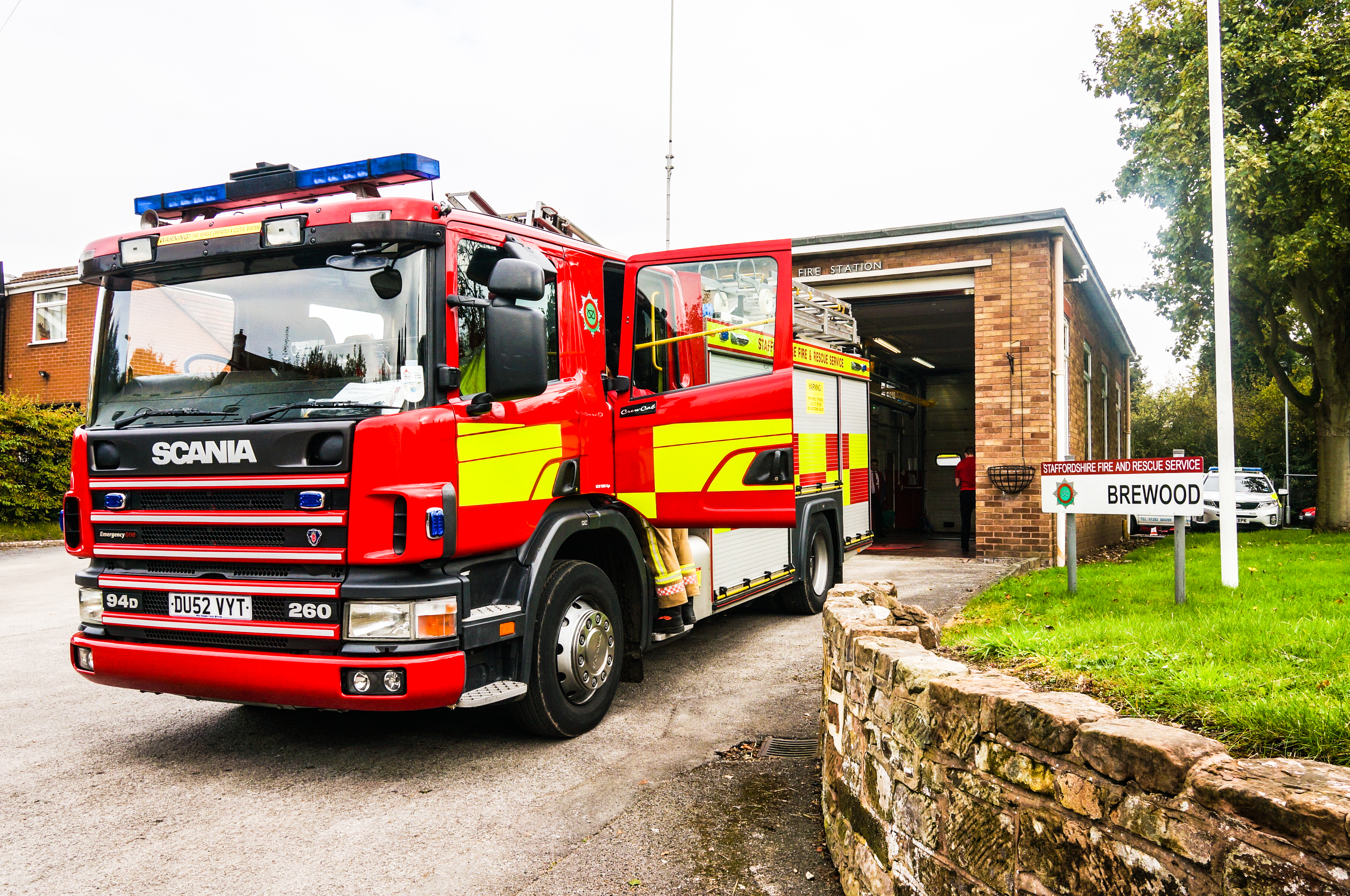
A Scania P94D appliance outside Brewood Fire Station in October 2015

Of the 33 strategically located fire stations, only Stafford, Tamworth Belgrave and Sandyford operate on a completely 24/7 wholetime duty system.

Longton, Hanley, Newcastle-under-Lyme, Cannock and Burton-upon-Trent operate as wholetime plus retained stations (WDS/RDS), which means, along with a 24-hour station-based complement of firefighters, they have retained on-call "back-up" personnel that, when required, crew the second fire engine housed at the fire station, as well as some of the specialist appliances that may be stationed there. All wholetime firefighters work the four "watch" system. This produces an eight-day rota, with crews operating on a "two-days-on, two-nights-on, four-days-off" system.

Leek and Lichfield fire stations operate as day-crewed and retained: firefighters respond from the fire station as wholetime firefighters between the hours of 8:00 am and 6:00 pm with a retained on-call crew available if needed to crew other appliances based at the station. After 6:00 pm the stations become retained on-call only, and the fire appliances are crewed by the same firefighters but not from the station itself.

All other Staffordshire fire stations operate the "on-call" retained duty system. All retained firefighters respond from home or work, and are notified by a pager, and, therefore, have to live or work within five minutes driving time of their station to meet strict Home Office response times.

== Performance ==
Every fire and rescue service in England and Wales is periodically subjected to a statutory inspection by His Majesty's Inspectorate of Constabulary and Fire & Rescue Services (HMICFRS). The inspections investigate how well the service performs in each of three areas. On a scale of outstanding, good, requires improvement and inadequate, Staffordshire Fire and Rescue Service was rated as follows:

HMICFRS Inspection Staffordshire
Area	Rating 2018/19	Rating 2021/22	Description
Effectiveness	Good	Good	How effective is the fire and rescue service at keeping people safe and secure from fire and other risks?
Efficiency	Good	Requires improvement	How efficient is the fire and rescue service at keeping people safe and secure from fire and other risks?
People	Good	Requires improvement	How well does the fire and rescue service look after its people?

== See also ==
- Fire service in the United Kingdom
- Staffordshire Police
- West Midlands Ambulance Service
- List of British firefighters killed in the line of duty
