= Team Bath F.C. =

Former association football club in England

Team Bath
- Full name: Team Bath Football Club
- Nicknames: The Crescents, The Scholars
- Founded: 1999
- Dissolved: 2009; 17 years ago
- Ground: Twerton Park; Bath
- Capacity: 8,840
- 2008–09: Conference South, 11th
Home colours	Away colours

Team Bath Football Club was an English association football club affiliated with the University of Bath in the city of Bath, Somerset. The club, formed in 1999, allowed players to combine professional football with higher education. In nine seasons, Team Bath rose rapidly through the English football league system to reach the Conference South in 2008. Still, the club disbanded at the end of the 2008–09 season following a decision by the Football Conference and the Football League to disqualify it from further promotion because of its financial structure.

The club competed in the Western League for the first time in 2000–01. Promotion that season, and again in 2002–03, gained the club entry into the Southern League. The club gained significant media exposure for an FA Cup run in the 2002–03 season, when it reached the first-round proper of the competition, becoming the first university team to compete at that stage since 1880. After five seasons in the Southern League, Team Bath was promoted into the Conference South after winning the 2007–08 Southern League Playoff Final.

Team Bath's home matches were played at the university's sports grounds for their first four seasons. In 2004 the club secured a deal to ground-share with Bath City at Twerton Park, capable of holding more than 8,000 supporters. Team Bath struggled to attract fans, and generally had among the lowest average attendances in their leagues.

== History ==
=== Formation and early success ===
In 1999, TeamBath, the sports department of the University of Bath, set out to establish a football club that played within the English professional league structure, but also allowed the players to continue their education with studies at the university. In the 2000–01 season, the club entered the Western League, the ninth level of the English football league system. Paul Tisdale, a recently retired player who had appeared for Southampton and Yeovil Town was appointed as the team's head coach. The team won promotion from Division One to the league's Premier Division in their first season. They continued to be successful in their second year, but missed out on back-to-back promotions, finishing fourth in the league in their first season in the Premier Division. They competed in the FA Vase for the first time in 2001–02, advancing to the third round before being eliminated by Arlesey Town.

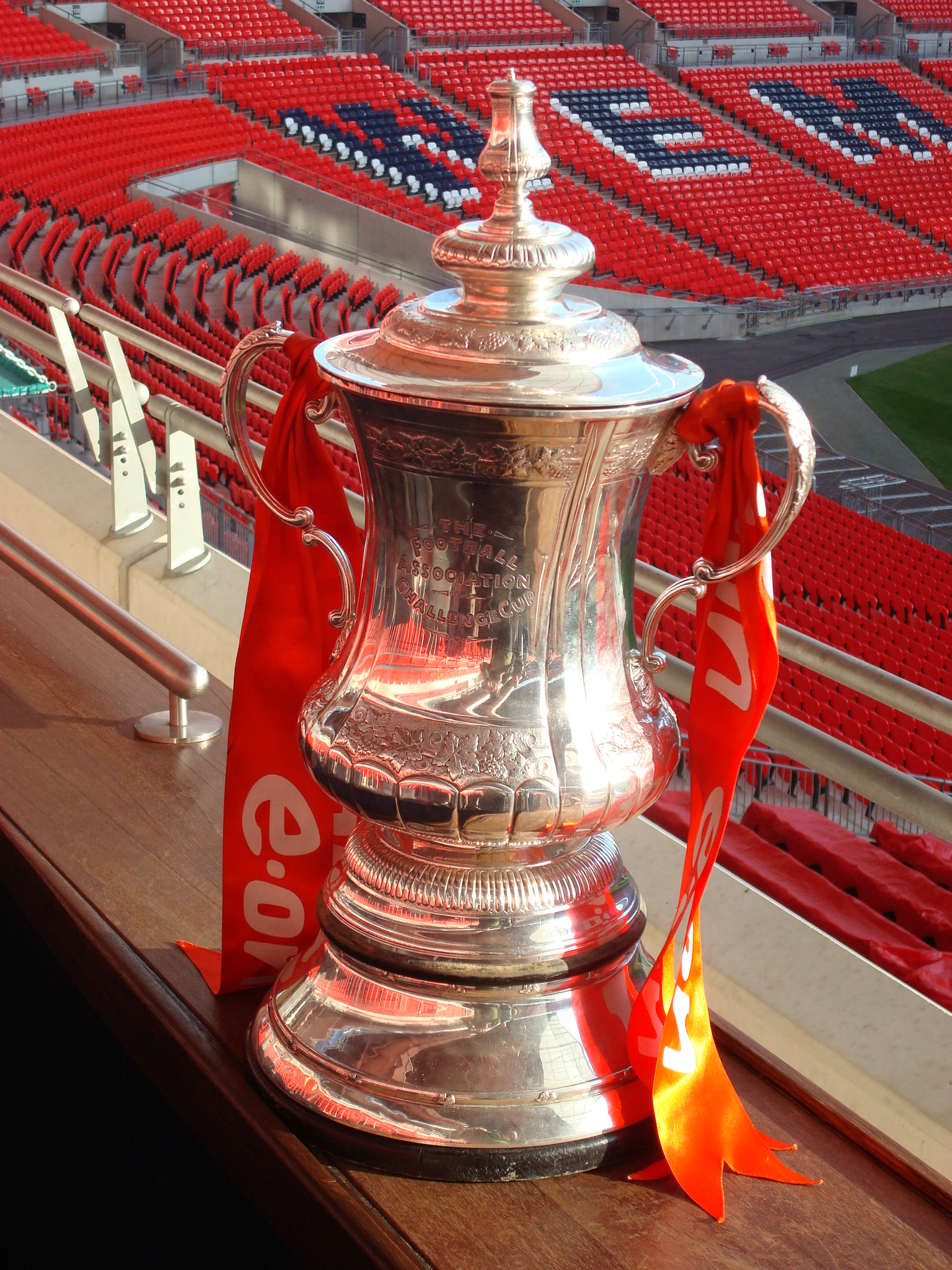
In 2002–03, Team Bath became the first university team since 1880 to reach the first round of the FA Cup.

In their third season, Team Bath attracted global interest due to their involvement in the FA Cup. Playing in the competition for the first time, Bath beat Barnstaple Town 4–0 in the preliminary round to begin their campaign. They followed this up with victories over Backwell United, Bemerton Heath Harlequins, and Newport County in the early stages of the qualifying rounds. They faced Horsham in the fourth qualifying round; a place in the first round proper awaiting the victors. The match at Horsham's ground finished 0–0, and the teams returned to Bath for the replay, which Bath won 4–2 on penalties after a 1–1 draw. Their victory meant that Team became the first university team to compete in the first round since Oxford University, who were runners up in 1880. Bath drew Mansfield Town at home, and despite the offer of reversing the fixture and playing at Mansfield's Field Mill stadium, the club opted to play the match at their home ground at the university, securing permission from the local police and the city council to erect temporary seating for the match. The match, which drew a record home attendance for Team Bath of 5,469, was won convincingly by Mansfield, who were leading 3–0 by half-time. Despite two late goals from Carl Heiniger and Caleb Kamara-Taylor, Bath lost the match 4–2, and was eliminated from the cup.

The team was less successful in the FA Vase: after beating Fairford Town in a replay, Bath were knocked out of the competition by Lymington & New Milton in the second round. In the league, Team Bath won 27 of their 34 matches and were unbeaten at home to finish top of the Western League Premier Division and gain promotion to the Southern League.

=== Southern League ===
Team Bath played the 2003–04 season in the Southern League Western Division, one of two divisions that fed the Premier Division. The team won 21 of their 40 matches and finished the season in sixth position. Despite their relative success, Team Bath struggled to attract spectators to their ground: their average home attendance of 103 was the lowest in the league, and their lowest attended matches were the 2–1 victory over Bedworth United, and their defeat by the same scoreline to Gresley Rovers, each of which had 55 recorded spectators. For the 2004–05 season, the non-league structure was adjusted due to introducing a second division for the Football Conference. As a result, Team Bath's sixth place in the Western Division was sufficient to "promote" them to the Premier Division of the Southern League.

The team struggled in the next two seasons, winning just 14 of their 42 league matches each season, resulting in league finishes of 14th and 17th respectively. In 2004–05, the club had its most successful FA Trophy campaign, reaching the Third round before being eliminated 2–1 by Histon. During the summer of 2006, head coach Paul Tisdale left the club to take up the vacant manager's position at Exeter City. He was replaced at Team Bath by Andy Tillson, a former Grimsby Town and Bristol Rovers defender. The 2006–07 season brought success to both Bath clubs; Bath City won the Southern League, and Team Bath finished as runners-up. In the playoffs, Team Bath won their semi final against Hemel Hempstead Town 3–1, and advanced to play Maidenhead United in the final. Maidenhead, who had been relegated from the Conference South the season before, won the match 1–0, consigning Team Bath to another season in the Southern League. Team Bath repeated their league form the following season, and once again finished as runners-up, this time behind King's Lynn. A 4–1 victory against Bashley in the playoff semi-final, aided by a hat-trick from the league's top-scorer Sean Canham, saw Bath reach their second successive playoff final. Team Bath improved on the previous season, beating Halesowen Town 2–1 in the final, Canham once again providing Bath with a decisive goal in the 89th minute. The win secured the team a place in the Conference South.

=== Conference South ===
For the 2008–09 season, Team Bath played at the highest level they achieved in their history. Competing in the Conference South, the club were two promotions away from The Football League. Early in the season Bath were competing for a play-off berth, but failed to maintain their form, eventually finishing 11th in the table with 16 wins. Towards the end of the season, the Football Conference notified Team Bath that as they were not a limited company they would be ineligible for further promotions, and would no longer be allowed to compete in the FA Cup; the club opted to resign from the Conference at the end of the season rather than restructure. Team Bath had at the time been discussing the possibility of a merger with Bath City, with the aim of getting the merged team into the Football League.

== Management and financing ==
Team Bath were managed by University of Bath director of sport Ged Roddy. Although the "nucleus" of the team was made up of students, they were supplemented by semi-professional players. The team was supported financially by the University of Bath, which according to an article published in the Bath Chronicle has declined to make detailed accounts publicly available, citing section 43 of the UK's Freedom of Information Act. In the 2005–6 season £48,510 was paid to players on sports scholarships, although no figures have been released for the amount paid to those not on scholarships. Neither has it been revealed how much was paid in rent for the use of Bath City's Twerton Park stadium, nor the remuneration received by the club's coaches.

== Performance summary ==
Season	Tier	Division	P	W	D	L	F	A	Pts	Pos	FA Cup	FA Trophy	FA Vase
Season	League										FA Cup	FA Trophy	FA Vase
2000–01	10	Western League; Division One ↑	36	26	6	4	108	22	84	1st	—	—	—
2001–02	9	Western League; Premier Division	28	22	7	9	74	36	73	4th	—	—	R3
2002–03	9	Western League; Premier Division ↑	34	27	3	4	109	28	84	1st	R1	—	R2
2003–04	8	Southern League; Western Division	40	21	6	13	62	41	69	6th	Q1	R1	—
2004–05	7	Southern League; Premier Division	42	14	12	16	54	68	54	14th	Q2	R3	—
2005–06	7	Southern League; Premier Division	42	14	6	22	55	68	48	17th	Q2	Q1	—
2006–07	7	Southern League; Premier Division	42	23	9	10	66	42	78	2nd	Q2	Q3	—
2007–08	7	Southern League; Premier Division ↑	42	25	8	9	71	41	83	2nd	R1	Q3	—
2008–09	6	Conference South	42	16	7	19	62	64	55	11th	R1	R1	—

== Records ==
- Best league finish: 11th out of 22 in Conference South, 2008–09
- Best FA Cup performance: First round, 2002–03, 2007–08, 2008–09
- Best FA Trophy performance: Third round, 2004–05
- Best FA Vase performance: Third round, 2001–02

== Honours ==
- Southern League Division One
  - Runners-up: 2006–07, 2007–08
- Western League Premier
  - Champions: 2002–03
- Western League Division One
  - Champions: 2000–01
- Somerset Premier Cup
  - Champions: 2006–07
- The FA Cup First round
  - 2002–03, 2007–08, 2008–09
