= Chase Terrace Academy =

Location
- Bridge Cross Road; Chase Terrace; Burntwood; Staffordshire, WS7 2DB; England; 52.6813°N 1.9256°W

Information
- Type: Academy
- Motto: Igniting Aspiration
- Local authority: Staffordshire
- Trust: John Taylor Multi-Academy Trust
- Department for Education URN: 143899 Tables
- Ofsted: Reports
- Headteacher: Nicola Mason
- Gender: Mixed
- Age: 11 to 18
- Enrolment: 1,363 as of August 2020
- Houses: Brocket, Elk, Fallow, Sika
- Website: https://www.chaseterraceacademy.co.uk

Chase Terrace Academy (formerly Chase Terrace Technology College and Chase Terrace High School before that) is a mixed secondary school and sixth form located in the Chase Terrace area of Burntwood in the English county of Staffordshire.

Originally known as Chase Terrace High School, the school acquired specialisms in Design and Technology and in the Visual, Media and Performing Arts and was renamed Chase Terrace Technology College. The school was destroyed by fire in August 2002, and was rebuilt and refurbished by 2004.

Previously a community school administered by Staffordshire County Council, in January 2017 Chase Terrace Technology College converted to academy status and is now a part of the John Taylor Multi-Academy Trust.

Chase Terrace Academy offers GCSEs and BTECs as programmes of study for pupils, while students in the sixth form have the option to study from a range of A-levels and further BTECs.

== Notable former pupils ==
- Stephen Sutton, blogger and charity activist
- Paul Manning, Olympic gold medalist
