= Kostas Kafalis =

Greek footballer

Personal information
- Full name: Konstantinos Kafalis
- Date of birth: 27 June 1978 (age 48)
- Place of birth: Athens, Greece
- Height: 1.79 m (5 ft 10 in)
- Position: Midfielder

Senior career*
Years	Team	Apps	(Gls)
–1997	Finikas Kallithea		
1997–2002	Panionios		
2002–2003	Akratitos		
2004–2005	Ionikos		
2005–2006	Ethnikos Achna		
2006–2007	Lamia		
- * Club domestic league appearances and goals

Kostas Kafalis (Greek: Κωστας Κάφαλης; born 27 June 1978) is a retired Greek football midfielder.

== Honours ==
Panionios

- Greek Cup: 1997–98
