= Giannis Fakkis =

Greek footballer

Personal information
- Full name: Ioannis Fakkis
- Date of birth: 14 April 2001 (age 25)
- Place of birth: Serres, Greece
- Height: 1.89 m (6 ft 2 in)
- Position: Forward

Team information
- Current team: Erani Filiatra
- Number: 16

Youth career
- 2017–2019: Xanthi

Senior career*
Years	Team	Apps	(Gls)
2019–2021	Xanthi	6	(0)
2021–2022	Iraklis	1	(0)
2022–2023	Thesprotos	8	(1)
2023–2024	Apollon Paralimnio		
2024–	Erani Filiatra		

International career^{‡}
2018	Greece U17	5	(1)
2019	Greece U19	3	(0)
- * Club domestic league appearances and goals as of 16 June 2023 ‡ National team caps and goals as of 18:02, 19 November 2019 (UTC)

Giannis Fakkis (Greek: Γιάννης Φάκκης; born 14 April 2001) is a Greek professional footballer who plays as a forward for Gamma Ethniki club Erani Filiatra.

== Career statistics ==
=== Club ===
As of 12 November 2019.

Club	Season	League			Cup		Continental		Other		Total	
Club	Season	Division	Apps	Goals	Apps	Goals	Apps	Goals	Apps	Goals	Apps	Goals
Xanthi	2018–19	Super League Greece	4	0	0	0	–		0	0	4	0
Xanthi	2019–20	Super League Greece	0	0	0	0	–		0	0	0	0
Career total			4	0	0	0	0	0	0	0	4	0
