= Steve Flack =

English footballer (born 1971)

Personal information
- Full name: Steven Richard Flack
- Date of birth: 29 May 1971 (age 55)
- Place of birth: Cambridge, England
- Height: 6 ft 2 in (1.88 m)
- Position: Striker

Senior career*
Years	Team	Apps	(Gls)
1995	Cambridge City	12	(3)
1995–1997	Cardiff City	11	(1)
1997–2006	Exeter City	378	(86)
2006	Tiverton Town	14	(2)
2006–2007	Dorchester Town		
- * Club domestic league appearances and goals

Steven Richard Flack (born 29 May 1971) is an English former professional footballer who played in the Football League for Cardiff City and Exeter City.

After playing amateur football as a teenager in Cambridgeshire, he attracted attention from several Football League clubs and signed for Cardiff City in November 1995 for £10,000. However, after making eleven appearances for the side, he was sold to Exeter City for the same price the following year. Flack remained with Exeter for ten years, making over 400 appearances in all competitions and becoming the club's fourth highest league goalscorer of all time. He later briefly played for non-league sides Tiverton Town and Dorchester Town.

== Career ==
=== Early career ===
Born in Cambridge, Flack grew up in the village of Orwell and played youth football for several local clubs before joining the village's football team Orwell, where his father Richard had played his entire amateur career. Making his senior debut as a left-back at the age of sixteen, he later converted to playing as a striker and finished as the club's top scorer in two seasons. The Orwell senior side was disbanded soon after and he instead joined Foxton where his prolific goalscoring attracted the attention of Cambridge City, joining the club in July 1995.

While playing for Cambridge, he attracted attention from several Football League clubs, including Cambridge United, Lincoln City and Barnet, before signing for Third Division side Cardiff City in November 1995 for £10,000. Cambridge United had already agreed a deal with Flack over a transfer but a late bid from Cardiff convinced him to move to South Wales. Prior to turning professional, Flack had worked as a hod carrier and bricklayer on building sites, competed as a boxer and been a stand-up comedian. He made his professional debut for the club on 13 January 1996 in a 1–0 defeat to Northampton Town, before scoring his first goal during a 3–1 defeat to Wigan Athletic on 16 March 1996. He made ten appearances in his first season of professional football, five coming as a substitute, but the arrival of Steve White at the start of the 1996–97 season saw Flack struggle to break into the first-team.

=== Exeter City ===
Having made just one appearance for Cardiff in the first two months of the season during a 2–0 defeat to Torquay United, Flack was sold to Exeter City in September 1996 for a fee of £10,000, making his debut for the side in a 2–1 victory over Brighton & Hove Albion. In his first full season at the club, he scored 14 league goals in 41 matches. During the 2000–01 season, Flack suffered medial ligament damage during a match against Scunthorpe United in November 2000 but returned to the first-team after six weeks and went on to finish the season as the club's top scorer.

In 2003, he suffered relegation from the Football League with Exeter, scoring the club's last goal in the league at the time on the final day of the season in a 1–0 victory over Southend United. Despite their victory, Swansea City survived after winning their final match, relegating Exeter to the Conference. Flack was the club's PFA representative and later commented on the financial difficulties they suffered, stating "Players weren't getting paid, some lost their houses, some lost their relationships. [...] There was loads going on – it wasn't good." Following their relegation, several clubs, including Hull City and Bristol Rovers who put in six-figure offers for the striker, made approaches to sign Flack but he rejected them in order to stay in Exeter where his family were settled.

In January 2005, he played in Exeter's 0–0 draw at Old Trafford against Manchester United in the FA Cup. Flack took a pay cut in May 2005 and turned down a potential move to Stockport County in order to stay at Exeter, citing his desire to work with manager Alex Inglethorpe.

The following season, Flack was mainly used as a substitute, although he did score the only hat-trick of his Exeter career in eleven minutes during a win over Southport on 4 March 2006, the fastest ever hat-trick scored for the club. He was awarded a testimonial match against Torquay United in July 2006 having spent ten years with Exeter, making over 400 appearances and becoming the club's fourth highest league goalscorer of all time. At the time of his departure, he was the longest serving player at the club.

=== Later career ===
On 26 May 2006, Flack signed for Exeter neighbours Tiverton Town as a player–coach, but on 7 December of the same year he joined Conference South club Dorchester Town on non-contract terms. He made his debut in a 0–0 draw with Braintree Town two days later, before scoring his first goal for the club in their following fixture, a 2–2 draw with Lewes. During his time at Dorchester, he scored twice in six appearances for the club. Flack was released on 1 March 2007 but complained that the club had done so without his knowledge, stating that he only discovered he had been released when an opposition manager contacted him and that he was owed wages by the club. However, Dorchester chairman Chris Pugsley refuted the claims.

Flack later had further player-coach roles at Tipton St. John and Axminster Town. After retiring from playing professionally, Flack returned to the building trade and set up his own construction business.
