= Chase Terrace =

Area of Burntwood, Staffordshire, England

Coordinates: 52.6844°N 1.9300°W

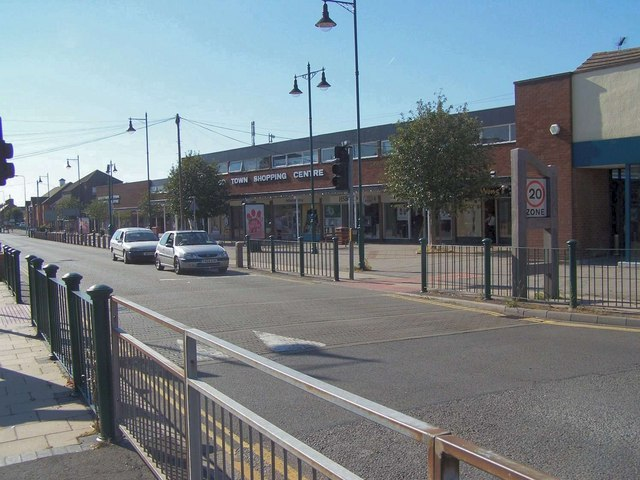
- Shopping centre at Chase Terrace

- Location within Staffordshire
- Population: 5,068 (Census 2001)
- OS grid reference: SK045095
- District: Lichfield
- Shire county: Staffordshire
- Region: West Midlands
- Country: England
- Sovereign state: United Kingdom
- Post town: BURNTWOOD
- Postcode district: WS7
- Dialling code: 01543
- Police: Staffordshire
- Fire: Staffordshire
- Ambulance: West Midlands
- UK Parliament: Lichfield

Chase Terrace is an area in the town of Burntwood in Staffordshire, England.

Chase Terrace began as a mining village in the 1860s with mines at the south side of Cannock Road. By 1884 Chase Terrace had gained a population of nearly 2,000. By 1959 all of the mines in the village had closed, by 1971 the population doubled as many people from Birmingham and the Black Country moved to Burntwood. Sankeys Corner became the commercial centre of Chase Terrace with an industrial estate, shopping centre and a market by 1970. A library and parish council were added by 1987. The area is the location of Chase Terrace Academy (formerly Chase Terrace High School). Chase Terrace is served by Chaserider (previously Arriva) bus services 60 and 62 to Cannock and Lichfield.
