= 2002–03 FA Cup =

Tournament details
- Country: England; Wales

Final positions
- Champions: Arsenal (9th title)
- Runners-up: Southampton

Tournament statistics
- Top goal scorer(s): Nigel Jemson (5 goals)

The 2002–03 FA Cup was the 122nd staging of the world's oldest cup competition, the FA Cup. The competition was won by Arsenal with a 1–0 victory in the final at the Millennium Stadium, Cardiff against Southampton, courtesy of a Robert Pires goal.

== Calendar ==
Round	Date (weekend of)
Extra preliminary round	
Preliminary round	
First round qualifying	
Second round qualifying	
Third round qualifying	Saturday 12 October 2002
Fourth round qualifying	Saturday 26 October 2002
First round proper	Saturday 16 November 2002
Second round	Saturday 7 December 2002
Third round	Saturday 4 January 2003
Fourth round	Saturday 25 January 2003
Fifth round	Saturday 15 February 2003
Sixth round	Saturday 8 March 2003
Semi-finals	Sunday 13 April 2003
Final	Saturday 17 May 2003

== Qualifying rounds ==
All participating clubs that were not members of the Premier League or Football League entered the competition in the qualifying rounds to secure one of 32 places available in the first round proper.

The winners from the fourth qualifying round were Runcorn Halton, Morecambe, Southport, Harrogate Railway Athletic, Doncaster Rovers, Barrow, Chester City, Scarborough, Burton Albion, Northwich Victoria, Vauxhall Motors, Harrogate Town, Guiseley, Moor Green, Stafford Rangers, Hereford United, St Albans City, Boreham Wood, Slough Town, Hastings United, Stevenage Borough, Crawley Town, Farnborough Town, Havant & Waterlooville, Margate, Dover Athletic, Tiverton Town, Dagenham & Redbridge, Heybridge Swifts, Forest Green Rovers, Team Bath and Yeovil Town.

Harrogate Railway Athletic, Harrogate Town and Team Bath were appearing in the competition proper for the first time. Additionally, Hastings United (formerly Hastings Town) and Dover Athletic were appearing at this stage for the first time in their own right after the original Hastings United and the original Dover FC had last qualified for the first round in 1981-82. The Ellesmere Port-based Vauxhall Motors was also featuring in the main draw for the first time in their own right after their now-defunct corporate rivals Vauxhall Motors (Luton) had reached the first round in 1947-48.

Of the others, Crawley Town had last appeared at this stage in 1994–95, Stafford Rangers had last done so in 1992-93, and Moor Green had last done so in 1979-80.

== First round proper ==
At this stage the 48 Second and Third Division clubs joined the 32 non-league clubs who came through the qualifying rounds. Step 8 sides Harrogate Railway Athletic, from the Northern Counties East League, and Team Bath, from the Western League, were the lowest-ranked teams in the draw.

The matches were scheduled to be played on the weekend of Saturday, 16 November 2002, with replays in the week commencing 25 November.

Tie no	Home team	Score	Away team	Date	Attendance	Summary
1	Chesterfield (3)	1–2	Morecambe (5)	16 November 2002	3,703	
2	AFC Bournemouth (4)	2–1	Doncaster Rovers (5)	16 November 2002	5,371	
3	Barrow (6)	2–0	Moor Green (6)	16 November 2002	2,650	
4	Bury (4)	0–3	Plymouth Argyle (3)	16 November 2002	2,987	
5	Rochdale (4)	3–2	Peterborough United (3)	16 November 2002	2,566	
6	Yeovil Town (5)	0–2	Cheltenham Town (3)	16 November 2002	6,455	
7	Vauxhall Motors (6)	0–0	Queens Park Rangers (3)	16 November 2002	3,507	
Replay	Queens Park Rangers (3)	1 – 1	Vauxhall Motors (6)	26 November 2002	5,336	
Vauxhall Motors won 4 – 3 on penalties
8	Northwich Victoria (5)	0–3	Scunthorpe United (4)	16 November 2002	1,724	
9	Luton Town (3)	4–0	Guiseley (7)	16 November 2002	5,248	
10	Swindon Town (3)	1–0	Huddersfield Town (3)	16 November 2002	4,210	
11	Scarborough (5)	0–0	Cambridge United (4)	16 November 2002	2,084	
Replay	Cambridge United (4)	2 – 1	Scarborough (5)	26 November 2002	3,373	
12	Shrewsbury Town (4)	4–0	Stafford Rangers (6)	16 November 2002	5,114	
13	Wrexham (4)	0–2	Darlington (4)	16 November 2002	3,442	
14	Tranmere Rovers (3)	2–2	Cardiff City (3)	16 November 2002	5,592	
Replay	Cardiff City (3)	2 – 1	Tranmere Rovers (3)	26 November 2002	6,853	
15	Stockport County (3)	4–1	St Albans City (6)	16 November 2002	3,303	
16	Wycombe Wanderers (3)	2–4	Brentford (3)	16 November 2002	5,673	
17	Kidderminster Harriers (4)	2–2	Rushden & Diamonds (4)	16 November 2002	3,079	
Replay	Rushden & Diamonds (4)	2 – 1	Kidderminster Harriers (4)	26 November 2002	3,391	
18	Barnsley (3)	1–4	Blackpool (3)	16 November 2002	6,857	
19	Bristol Rovers (4)	0–0	Runcorn Halton (6)	16 November 2002	4,135	
Replay	Runcorn Halton (6)	1 – 3	Bristol Rovers (4)	26 November 2002	2,444	
20	Northampton Town (3)	3–2	Boston United (4)	16 November 2002	4,373	
21	Hull City (4)	0–3	Macclesfield Town (4)	16 November 2002	7,803	
22	Carlisle United (4)	2–1	Lincoln City (4)	16 November 2002	4,388	
23	Oldham Athletic (3)	2–2	Burton Albion (5)	16 November 2002	5,802	
Replay	Burton Albion (5)	2 – 2	Oldham Athletic (3)	27 November 2002	3,416	
Oldham Athletic won 5 – 4 on penalties
24	Southend United (4)	1–1	Hartlepool United (4)	16 November 2002	4,984	
Replay	Hartlepool United (4)	1 – 2	Southend United (4)	26 November 2002	4,080	
25	Port Vale (3)	0–1	Crewe Alexandra (3)	16 November 2002	5,507	
26	Southport (5)	4–2	Notts County (3)	16 November 2002	3,519	
27	Torquay United (4)	5–0	Boreham Wood (6)	16 November 2002	2,739	
28	York City (4)	2–1	Swansea City (4)	26 November 2002 (Note: Postponed due to waterlogged pitch)	2,948	
29	Hereford United (5)	0–1	Wigan Athletic (3)	16 November 2002	4,005	
30	Tiverton Town (6)	1–1	Crawley Town (6)	16 November 2002	1,840	
Replay	Crawley Town (6)	3 – 2	Tiverton Town (6)	26 November 2002	3,907	
31	Colchester United (3)	0–1	Chester City (5)	16 November 2002	2,901	
32	Leyton Orient (4)	1–1	Margate (5)	16 November 2002	3,605	
Replay	Margate (5)	1 – 0	Leyton Orient (4)	26 November 2002	2,048	
33	Slough Town (7)	1–2	Harrogate Railway Athletic (8)	16 November 2002	1,687	
34	Farnborough Town (5)	5–1	Harrogate Town (6)	16 November 2002	1,090	
35	Forest Green Rovers (5)	0–0	Exeter City (4)	17 November 2002	2,147	
Replay	Exeter City (4)	2 – 1	Forest Green Rovers (5)	26 November 2002	2,951	
36	Heybridge Swifts (6)	0–7	Bristol City (3)	16 November 2002	2,046	
37	Stevenage Borough (5)	1–0	Hastings United (6)	16 November 2002	1,821	
38	Dover Athletic (6)	0–1	Oxford United (4)	16 November 2002	4,186	
39	Dagenham & Redbridge (5)	3–2	Havant & Waterlooville (6)	16 November 2002	1,546	
40	Team Bath (8)	2–4	Mansfield Town (3)	16 November 2002	5,469	

== Second round proper ==
The matches were scheduled to be played on the weekend of Saturday, 7 December 2002, with replays in the week commencing 16 December. Harrogate Railway Athletic was again the lowest-ranked team in the draw.

Tie no	Home team	Score	Away team	Date	Attendance	Summary
1	Blackpool (3)	3–1	Torquay United (4)	7 December 2002	5,014	
2	Darlington (4)	4–1	Stevenage Borough (5)	7 December 2002	3,351	
3	Macclesfield Town (4)	2–0	Vauxhall Motors (6)	7 December 2002	2,972	
4	Crewe Alexandra (3)	3–0	Mansfield Town (3)	7 December 2002	4,563	
5	Shrewsbury Town (4)	3–1	Barrow (6)	7 December 2002	4,210	
6	Stockport County (3)	0–3	Plymouth Argyle (3)	7 December 2002	3,571	
7	Bristol Rovers (4)	1–1	Rochdale (4)	7 December 2002	4,369	
Replay	Rochdale (4)	3 – 2	Bristol Rovers (4)	17 December 2002	2,206	
8	Oldham Athletic (3)	1–2	Cheltenham Town (3)	7 December 2002	4,416	
9	Southend United (4)	1–1	AFC Bournemouth (4)	7 December 2002	5,721	
Replay	AFC Bournemouth (4)	3 – 2	Southend United (4)	17 December 2002	5,456	
10	Exeter City (4)	3–1	Rushden & Diamonds (4)	7 December 2002	2,277	
11	Scunthorpe United (4)	0–0	Carlisle United (4)	7 December 2002	3,590	
Replay	Carlisle United (4)	0 – 1	Scunthorpe United (4)	23 December 2002 (Note: Match postponed due to frozen pitch)	6,809	
12	Margate (5)	0–3	Cardiff City (3)	7 December 2002	1,362	
13	Southport (5)	0–3	Farnborough Town (5)	7 December 2002	2,534	
14	Morecambe (5)	3–2	Chester City (5)	7 December 2002	4,293	
15	York City (4)	1–2	Brentford (3)	7 December 2002	3,517	
16	Wigan Athletic (3)	3–0	Luton Town (3)	7 December 2002	4,544	
17	Cambridge United (4)	2–2	Northampton Town (3)	7 December 2002	5,076	
Replay	Northampton Town (3)	0 – 1	Cambridge United (4)	17 December 2002	4,591	
18	Harrogate Railway Athletic (8)	1–3	Bristol City (3)	8 December 2002	3,500	
19	Crawley Town (6)	1–2	Dagenham & Redbridge (5)	7 December 2002	4,516	
20	Oxford United (4)	1–0	Swindon Town (3)	8 December 2002	11,645	

== Third round proper ==
This round was the first in which Division 1 and Premier League (top-flight) teams entered the competition. The matches were scheduled to be played on the weekend of Saturday, 4 January 2003, with replays in the week commencing 13 January. The round featured three clubs from the Football Conference (Step 5): Farnborough Town, Morecambe and Dagenham & Redbridge.

Shrewsbury, who ended the season with relegation from the Football League, achieved the biggest upset of the round (if not the whole competition), with a surprise 2–1 win over an Everton side who were pushing for a place in Europe and featuring a 17-year-old striker called Wayne Rooney – one of the most promising young players in the game.

Tie no	Home team	Score	Away team	Date	Attendance	Summary
1	Blackpool (3)	1–2	Crystal Palace (2)	4 January 2003	9,062	
2	Darlington (4)	2–3	Farnborough Town (5)	4 January 2003	4,260	
3	AFC Bournemouth (4)	0–0	Crewe Alexandra (3)	4 January 2003	7,252	
Replay	Crewe Alexandra (3)	2 – 2	AFC Bournemouth (4)	14 January 2003	4,540	
AFC Bournemouth won 3 – 1 on penalties
4	Preston North End (2)	1–2	Rochdale (4)	4 January 2003	8,762	
5	Southampton (1)	4–0	Tottenham Hotspur (1)	4 January 2003	25,589	
6	Walsall (2)	0–0	Reading (2)	4 January 2003	5,987	
Replay	Reading (2)	1 – 1	Walsall (2)	14 January 2003	8,767	
Walsall won 4 – 1 on penalties
7	Gillingham (2)	4–1	Sheffield Wednesday (2)	7 January 2003	6,434	
8	Leicester City (2)	2–0	Bristol City (3)	4 January 2003	25,868	
9	Aston Villa (1)	1–4	Blackburn Rovers (1)	4 January 2003	23,884	
10	Bolton Wanderers (1)	1–1	Sunderland (1)	4 January 2003	10,123	
Replay	Sunderland (1)	2 – 0	Bolton Wanderers (1)	14 January 2003	14,550	
11	Grimsby Town (2)	2–2	Burnley (2)	4 January 2003	5,350	
Replay	Burnley (2)	4 – 0	Grimsby Town (2)	14 January 2003	5,436	
12	Macclesfield Town (4)	0–2	Watford (2)	4 January 2003	4,244	
13	Wolverhampton Wanderers (2)	3–2	Newcastle United (1)	5 January 2003	27,316	
14	West Bromwich Albion (1)	3–1	Bradford City (2)	4 January 2003	19,909	
15	Shrewsbury Town (4)	2–1	Everton (1)	4 January 2003	7,800	
16	Sheffield United (2)	4–0	Cheltenham Town (3)	4 January 2003	9,166	
17	Ipswich Town (2)	4–0	Morecambe (5)	4 January 2003	18,529	
18	Manchester City (1)	0–1	Liverpool (1)	5 January 2003	28,586	
19	Fulham (1)	3–1	Birmingham City (1)	5 January 2003	9,203	
20	Brentford (3)	1–0	Derby County (2)	4 January 2003	8,709	
21	West Ham United (1)	3–2	Nottingham Forest (2)	4 January 2003	29,612	
22	Manchester United (1)	4–1	Portsmouth (2)	4 January 2003	67,222	
23	Norwich City (2)	3–1	Brighton & Hove Albion (2)	14 January 2003 (Note: Original match postponed because of power failure)	17,205	
24	Plymouth Argyle (3)	2–2	Dagenham & Redbridge (5)	4 January 2003	11,885	
Replay	Dagenham & Redbridge (5)	2 – 0	Plymouth Argyle (3)	14 January 2003	4,530	
25	Chelsea (1)	1–0	Middlesbrough (1)	4 January 2003	29,796	
26	Scunthorpe United (4)	0–2	Leeds United (1)	4 January 2003	8,329	
27	Cardiff City (3)	2–2	Coventry City (2)	4 January 2003	16,013	
Replay	Coventry City (2)	3 – 0	Cardiff City (3)	15 January 2003	11,997	
28	Charlton Athletic (1)	3–1	Exeter City (4)	4 January 2003	18,107	
29	Arsenal (1)	2–0	Oxford United (4)	4 January 2003	35,432	
30	Stoke City (2)	3–0	Wigan Athletic (3)	4 January 2003	9,618	
31	Rotherham United (2)	0–3	Wimbledon (2)	4 January 2003	4,527	
32	Cambridge United (4)	1–1	Millwall (2)	4 January 2003	6,864	
Replay	Millwall (2)	3 – 2	Cambridge United (4)	14 January 2003	7,031	

== Fourth round proper ==
- Matches played weekend of 25 January 2003
- Four replays played week commencing 3 February 2003
- Farnborough Town and Dagenham & Redbridge were again the lowest-ranked teams in the draw. By this stage, they were also the last non-league teams left in the competition.

Tie no	Home team	Score	Away team	Date	Attendance	Summary
1	Rochdale (4)	2–0	Coventry City (2)	25 January 2003	9,156	
2	Southampton (1)	1–1	Millwall (2)	25 January 2003	23,809	
Replay	Millwall (2)	1 – 2	Southampton (1)	5 February 2003	10,197	
3	Watford (2)	1–0	West Bromwich Albion (1)	25 January 2003	16,975	
4	Walsall (2)	2–0	Wimbledon (2)	25 January 2003	6,693	
5	Gillingham (2)	1–1	Leeds United (1)	25 January 2003	11,093	
Replay	Leeds United (1)	2 – 1	Gillingham (2)	4 February 2003	29,359	
6	Blackburn Rovers (1)	3–3	Sunderland (1)	25 January 2003	14,315	
Replay	Sunderland (1)	2 – 2	Blackburn Rovers (1)	5 February 2003	15,745	
Sunderland won 3 – 0 on penalties
7	Wolverhampton Wanderers (2)	4–1	Leicester City (2)	25 January 2003	28,164	
8	Shrewsbury Town (4)	0–4	Chelsea (1)	26 January 2003	7,950	
9	Sheffield United (2)	4–3	Ipswich Town (2)	25 January 2003	12,757	
10	Fulham (1)	3–0	Charlton Athletic (1)	26 January 2003	12,203	
11	Brentford (3)	0–3	Burnley (2)	25 January 2003	9,563	
12	Manchester United (1)	6–0	West Ham United (1)	26 January 2003	67,181	
13	Norwich City (2)	1–0	Dagenham & Redbridge (5)	25 January 2003	21,164	
14	Crystal Palace (2)	0–0	Liverpool (1)	26 January 2003	26,054	
Replay	Liverpool (1)	0 – 2	Crystal Palace (2)	5 February 2003	35,109	
15	Farnborough Town (5)	1–5	Arsenal (1)	25 January 2003	35,108 (Note: Played at Highbury)	
16	Stoke City (2)	3–0	AFC Bournemouth (4)	26 January 2003	12,004	

== Fifth round proper ==
- Matches played weekend of 15 February 2003
- One replay played 26 February 2003
- Third Division side Rochdale was the lowest-ranked team in the draw and the last team from the First Round left in the competition

Tie no	Home team	Score	Away team	Date	Attendance	Summary
1	Southampton (1)	2–0	Norwich City (2)	15 February 2003	31,103	
2	Wolverhampton Wanderers (2)	3–1	Rochdale (4)	16 February 2003	23,921	
3	Sunderland (1)	0–1	Watford (2)	15 February 2003	26,916	
4	Sheffield United (2)	2–0	Walsall (2)	15 February 2003	17,510	
5	Fulham (1)	1–1	Burnley (2)	16 February 2003	13,062	
Replay	Burnley (2)	3–0	Fulham (1)	26 February 2003	11,635	
6	Manchester United (1)	0–2	Arsenal (1)	15 February 2003	67,209	
7	Crystal Palace (2)	1–2	Leeds United (1)	16 February 2003	24,512	
8	Stoke City (2)	0–2	Chelsea (1)	16 February 2003	26,615	

== Sixth round proper ==
Holders Arsenal moved closer to retaining the trophy by beating Chelsea 3–1 in a replay that followed a 2–2 draw. They were paired in the semi-finals with Sheffield United, while the other semi-final would be contested between Southampton and Watford.

8 March 2003
17:15

Arsenal (1)	2–2	Chelsea (1)
Jeffers 36'; Henry 45'	(Summary)	Terry 3'; Lampard 83'

Highbury, London
Attendance: 38,104
Referee: Paul Durkin (Dorset)

9 March 2003
11:30

Sheffield United (2)	1–0	Leeds United (1)
Kabba 78'	(Summary)

Bramall Lane, Sheffield
Attendance: 24,633
Referee: Steve Bennett (Kent)

9 March 2003
13:30

Watford (2)	2–0	Burnley (2)
Smith 74'; Glass 80'	(Summary)

Vicarage Road, Watford
Attendance: 20,336
Referee: Alan Wiley (Staffordshire)

9 March 2003
16:00

Southampton (1)	2–0	Wolverhampton Wanderers (2)
Marsden 56'; Butler 81' (o.g.)	(Summary)

St Mary's, Southampton
Attendance: 31,715
Referee: Andy D'Urso (Essex)

=== Replay ===
25 March 2003
19:45

Chelsea (1)	1–3	Arsenal (1)
Terry 79'	(Summary)	Terry 25' (o.g.); Wiltord 34'; Lauren 82'

Stamford Bridge, London
Attendance: 41,456
Referee: David Elleray (Middlesex)

== Semi-finals ==
For the 11th season running, the FA Cup final would be contested by top division clubs – Arsenal and Southampton. Their semi-final opponents (Sheffield United and Watford respectively) were both Division One sides.

13 April 2003
13:30

Arsenal (1)	1–0	Sheffield United (2)
Ljungberg 34'	Report

Old Trafford, Manchester
Attendance: 59,170
Referee: Graham Poll (Hertfordshire)

13 April 2003
16:30

Watford (2)	1–2	Southampton (1)
Gayle 88'	Report	Ormerod 43'; Robinson 80' (o.g.)

Villa Park, Birmingham
Attendance: 42,602
Referee: Mike Riley (West Yorkshire)

== Final ==
The final took place on Saturday, 17 May 2003 at the Millennium Stadium in Cardiff and ended 1–0 with a goal by Robert Pires separating the sides.

It was the third consecutive year the final was played at the Millennium Stadium, due to the ongoing reconstruction of Wembley Stadium, the final's usual venue. There were 73,726 spectators at the game. Arsenal retained the trophy, winning it for the ninth time in their history – a record second only to that of Manchester United.

It was also Southampton's first FA Cup final since 1976, when they won the trophy for the only time to date.

17 May 2003
15:00 BST

Arsenal	1–0	Southampton
Pires 38'	Report

Millennium Stadium, Cardiff
Attendance: 73,726
Referee: Graham Barber (Hertfordshire)

== Media coverage ==
In the United Kingdom, the BBC were the free to air broadcasters for the second consecutive season while Sky Sports were the subscription broadcasters for the fifteenth consecutive season.

The matches shown live on the BBC were:

- Forest Green Rovers 0-0 Exeter City (R1)
- Oxford United 1-0 Swindon Town (R2)
- Southampton 4-0 Tottenham Hotspur (R3)
- Manchester City 0-1 Liverpool (R3)
- Manchester United 6-0 West Ham United (R4)
- Shrewsbury Town 0-4 Chelsea (R4)
- Manchester United 0-2 Arsenal (R5)
- Wolverhampton Wanderers 3-1 Rochdale (R5)
- Arsenal 2-2 Chelsea (QF)
- Watford 2-0 Burnley (QF)
- Arsenal 1-0 Sheffield United (SF)
- Arsenal 1-0 Southampton (Final)

The matches shown live on Sky Sports were:

- Team Bath 2-4 Mansfield Town (R1)
- Hereford United 0-1 Wigan Athletic (R1)
- Burton Albion 2-2 Oldham Athletic (R1 Replay)
- Macclesfield Town 2-0 Vauxhall Motors (R2)
- Harrogate Railway 1-3 Bristol City (R2)
- Manchester United 4-1 Portsmouth (R3)
- Wolverhampton Wanderers 3-2 Newcastle United (R3)
- Coventry City 3-0 Cardiff City (R3 Replay)
- Gillingham 1-1 Leeds United (R4)
- Crystal Palace 0-0 Liverpool (R4)
- Millwall 1-2 Southampton (R4 Replay)
- Crystal Palace 1-2 Leeds United (R5)
- Stoke City 0-2 Chelsea (R5)
- Burnley 3-0 Fulham (R5 Replay)
- Sheffield United 1-0 Leeds United (QF)
- Southampton 2-0 Wolverhampton Wanderers (QF)
- Chelsea 1-3 Arsenal (QF Replay)
- Watford 1-2 Southampton (SF)
- Arsenal 1-0 Southampton (Final)

The second round replay between Carlisle United vs. Scunthorpe United was originally scheduled to be on Sky Sports on 19 December 2002, but because of weather conditions, the game was postponed.
