= 2000–01 Western Football League =

Western Football League
- Season: 2000–01
- Champions: Taunton Town (Premier Division); Team Bath (Division One)

The 2000–01 season was the 99th in the history of the Western Football League.

The league champions for the sixth time in their history (and the third season running) were Taunton Town, but runners-up Chippenham Town took promotion to the Southern League. The champions of Division One were the newly formed Team Bath.

== Final tables ==
=== Premier Division ===
The Premier Division was increased from 19 clubs to 20 after Mangotsfield United were promoted to the Southern League, and two clubs joined:

- Devizes Town, champions of the First Division.
- Welton Rovers, runners-up in the First Division.

Pos	Team	Pld	W	D	L	GF	GA	GD	Pts	Promotion or relegation
1	Taunton Town (C)	38	31	4	3	133	41	+92	97	
2	Chippenham Town (P)	38	30	5	3	109	27	+82	95	Promoted to the Southern League
3	Paulton Rovers	38	23	10	5	92	44	+48	79	
4	Yeovil Town Reserves	38	21	8	9	84	46	+38	71	
5	Bideford	38	19	10	9	71	45	+26	67	
6	Backwell United	38	19	7	12	59	37	+22	64	
7	Devizes Town	38	19	5	14	88	62	+26	62	
8	Brislington	38	17	10	11	67	48	+19	61	
9	Melksham Town	38	17	6	15	58	54	+4	57	
10	Welton Rovers	38	15	8	15	63	53	+10	53	
11	Dawlish Town	38	14	6	18	50	68	−18	48	
12	Elmore	38	14	4	20	67	80	−13	46	
13	Bridport	38	10	13	15	51	63	−12	43	
14	Barnstaple Town	38	12	7	19	45	79	−34	43	
15	Bridgwater Town	38	11	11	16	45	58	−13	41 (Note: Bridgwater Town and Minehead Town each had three points deducted.)	
16	Odd Down	38	10	8	20	34	57	−23	38	
17	Bishop Sutton	38	9	11	18	57	86	−29	38	
18	Bristol Manor Farm	38	8	8	22	37	66	−29	32	
19	Westbury United	38	3	5	30	27	101	−74	14	
20	Minehead Town (R)	38	5	0	33	34	156	−122	12	Relegated to the First Division

(C) Champions; (P) Promoted; (R) Relegated

=== First Division ===
The First Division was increased from 17 clubs to 20 after Devizes Town and Welton Rovers were promoted to the Premier Division, and five clubs joined:

- Bath City Reserves, rejoining the league after leaving in 1992.
- Cadbury Heath, promoted from the Gloucestershire County League.
- Hallen, transferred and demoted from the Hellenic League.
- Team Bath, a newly formed club.
- Worle St Johns, promoted from the Somerset Senior League.

Pos	Team	Pld	W	D	L	GF	GA	GD	Pts	Promotion
1	Team Bath (C, P)	36	26	6	4	108	22	+86	84	Promoted to the Premier Division
2	Keynsham Town (P)	36	25	7	4	79	35	+44	82	Promoted to the Premier Division
3	Frome Town	36	21	4	11	77	45	+32	67	
4	Hallen	36	20	6	10	81	52	+29	66	
5	Bitton	36	19	7	10	66	49	+17	64	
6	Bath City Reserves	36	17	6	13	74	70	+4	57	
7	Exmouth Town	36	15	7	14	76	54	+22	52	
8	Warminster Town	36	14	10	12	48	53	−5	52	
9	Corsham Town	36	16	4	16	60	67	−7	52	
10	Torrington	36	14	8	14	69	72	−3	50	
11	Chard Town	36	11	9	16	52	75	−23	42	
12	Pewsey Vale	36	12	6	18	48	79	−31	42	Transferred to the Hellenic League
13	Street	36	10	9	17	40	63	−23	39	
14	Wellington	36	11	5	20	40	63	−23	38	
15	Larkhall Athletic	36	11	5	20	46	73	−27	38	
16	Ilfracombe Town	36	9	10	17	48	64	−16	37	
17	Cadbury Heath	36	10	5	21	48	68	−20	35	
18	Worle St Johns	36	10	5	21	64	87	−23	35	
19	Calne Town	36	8	7	21	35	68	−33	31	
20	Clyst Rovers	0	0	0	0	0	0	0	0 (Note: Clyst Rovers were unable to complete their fixtures due to an outbreak of foot-and-mouth disease. Their results were expunged from the table but they did not leave the league and resumed as normal the following season.)	

Rules for classification: The system of using goal difference to separate two teams tied on points was used. The points system: 3 points for a win, 1 point for a draw and 0 points for losing.
(C) Champions; (P) Promoted
