= 2007–08 FA Cup =

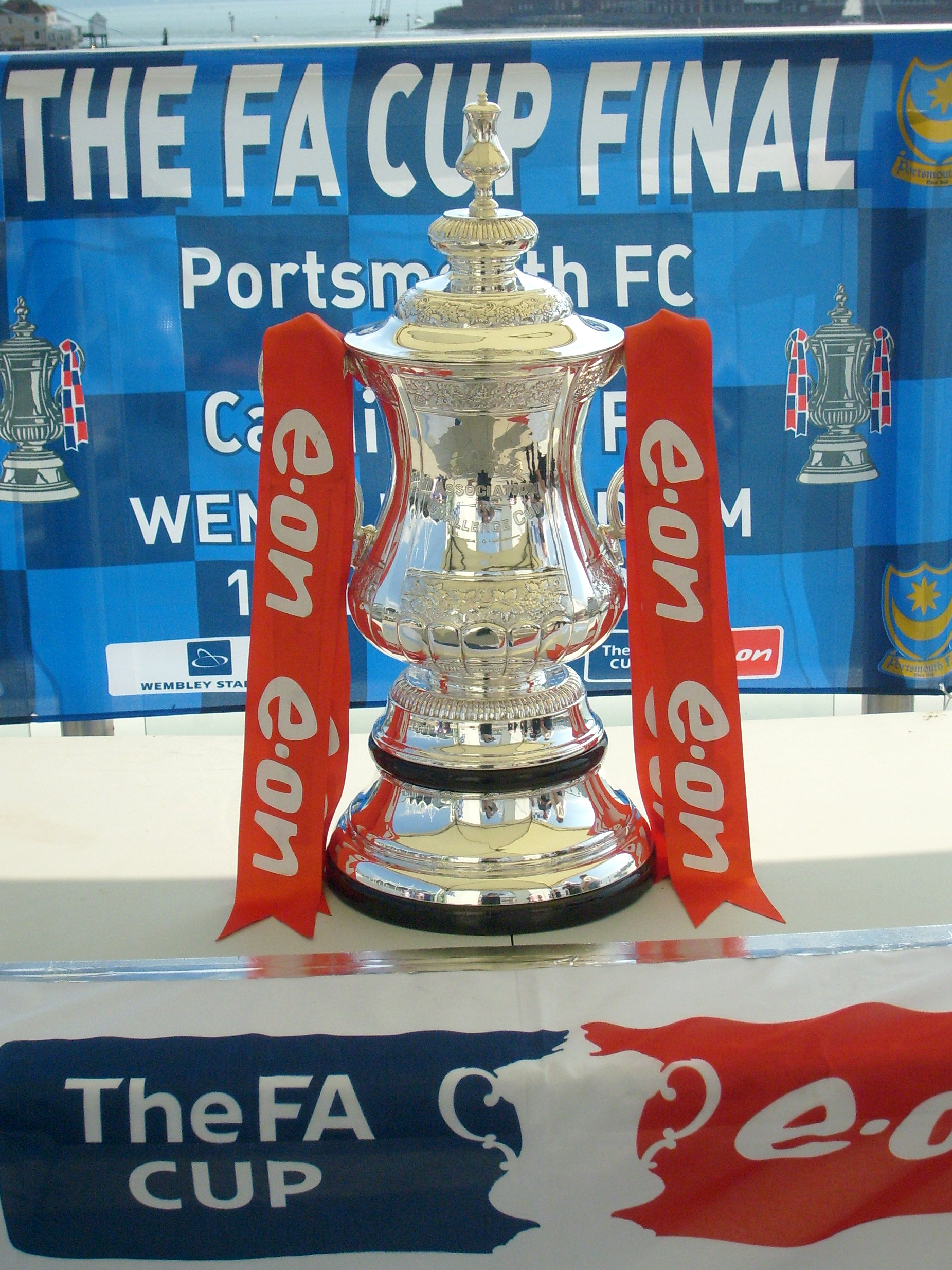
- The FA Cup on the roof terrace of Portsmouth's Spinnaker Tower on 12 May 2008

Tournament details
- Country: England; Wales
- Teams: 731

Final positions
- Champions: Portsmouth (2nd title)
- Runners-up: Cardiff City

Tournament statistics
- Top goal scorer(s): Craig Mackail-Smith (7 goals)

The 2007–08 FA Cup (known as the FA Cup sponsored by E.ON for sponsorship reasons) was the 127th season of the world's oldest football knockout competition, the FA Cup. A record 731 clubs' entries were accepted for the competition.

The competition culminated with the final held at Wembley Stadium, London on 17 May 2008. The match was contested by Portsmouth and Cardiff City; Nwankwo Kanu scored the only goal of the game to give Portsmouth the title.

The appearance in the Cup Final by Cardiff City, a Level 2 team, marked the second time in 5 years that a team outside Level 1 of the English football pyramid appeared in the final game.

This was the last FA Cup to be broadcast by the BBC and Sky Sports in the United Kingdom, before coverage was handed over to ITV and Setanta starting in August 2008.

== Calendar ==
Round	Date	Matches	Clubs	New entries this round	Prize money	Player of the Round
Extra preliminary round	18 August 2007	171	729 → 558	342: 388th–729th	£500	none
Preliminary round	1 September 2007	166	558 → 392	161: 227th–387th	£1,000	none
First round qualifying	15 September 2007	116	392 → 276	66: 161st–226th	£2,250	Jack Pitcher (Gloucester City)
Second round qualifying	29 September 2007	80	276 → 196	44: 117th–160th	£3,750	Matt Townley (Team Bath)
Third round qualifying	13 October 2007	40	196 → 156	none	£5,000	Andy Forbes (Eastleigh)
Fourth round qualifying	27 October 2007	32	156 → 124	24: 93rd–116th	£10,000	Craig Farrell (York City)
First round proper	10 November 2007	40	124 → 84	48: 45th–92nd	£16,000	Stuart Beavon (Weymouth)
Second round proper	1 December 2007	20	84 → 64	none	£24,000	Craig Mackail-Smith (Peterborough United)
Third round proper	5 January 2008	32	64 → 32	44: 1st–44th	£40,000	Michael Mifsud (Coventry City)
Fourth round proper	26 January 2008	16	32 → 16	none	£60,000	Alfie Potter (Havant & Waterlooville)
Fifth round proper	16 February 2008	8	16 → 8	none	£120,000	Luke Steele (Barnsley)
Sixth round proper	8 March 2008	4	8 → 4	none	£300,000	Kayode Odejayi (Barnsley)
Semi-finals	5 April 2008	2	4 → 2	none	£900,000	Joe Ledley (Cardiff City)
Final	17 May 2008	1	2 → 1	none	£1,000,000	Nwankwo Kanu (Portsmouth)

== Qualifying rounds ==
All participating clubs that were not members of the Premier League or Football League entered the competition in the qualifying rounds to secure one of 32 places available in the first round proper.

The winners from the fourth qualifying round were Halifax Town, Droylsden, Altrincham, Rushden & Diamonds, Burton Albion, Histon, Cambridge United, Northwich Victoria, Barrow, Gainsborough Trinity, Workington, York City, Kidderminster Harriers, Harrogate Railway Athletic, Chasetown, Weymouth, Team Bath, Maidenhead United, Stevenage Borough, Oxford United, Hampton & Richmond Borough, Torquay United, Aldershot Town, Horsham, Forest Green Rovers, Eastbourne Borough, Ware, Billericay Town, Lewes, Staines Town, Exeter City and Havant & Waterlooville.

For the first time since 1985–86 (and for only the fourth time since the introduction of FA Cup qualifying rounds), all of the 32 successful clubs had appeared in the competition proper before. However, Staines Town had last featured at this stage in 1984-85, Workington had last done so in 1982-83, Droylsden in 1978-79, Ware in 1968-69, and Horsham in 1966-67.

== First round proper ==
This round is the first in which Football League teams from League One and League Two compete with non-league teams.

- Ties were played over the weekend of 10 November and 11 November 2007.
- Leeds United, now a third-tier side, made their earliest ever entry to the FA Cup and suffered a surprise 1–0 home defeat to Hereford United in the replay that followed a goalless draw.
- The round featured three sides from Step 8 of English football: Harrogate Railway Athletic from the Northern Premier League First Division North, Chasetown from the Southern League First Division Midlands and Ware from the Isthmian League First Division North.

Tie no	Home team	Score	Away team	Attendance
1	Darlington (4)	1–1	Northampton Town (3)	2,964
replay	Northampton Town (3)	2–1	Darlington (4)	2,895
2	Hampton & Richmond Borough (6)	0–3	Dagenham & Redbridge (4)	2,252
3	Torquay United (5)	4–1	Yeovil Town (3)	3,718
4	Leyton Orient (3)	1–1	Bristol Rovers (3)	3,157
replay	Bristol Rovers (3)	3–3	Leyton Orient (3)	3,742
Bristol Rovers won 6–5 on penalties
5	Bury (4)	4–1	Workington (6)	2,641
6	Barnet (4)	2–1	Gillingham (3)	2,843
7	Accrington Stanley (4)	2–3	Huddersfield Town (3)	2,202
8	Barrow (6)	1–1	AFC Bournemouth (3)	2,203
replay	AFC Bournemouth (3)	3–2	Barrow (6)	2,969
9	Forest Green Rovers (5)	2–2	Rotherham United (4)	2,102
replay	Rotherham United (4)	0–3	Forest Green Rovers (5)	2,754
10	Southend United (3)	2–1	Rochdale (4)	5,180
11	Team Bath (7)	0–2	Chasetown (8)	2,067
12	Bradford City (4)	1–0	Chester City (4)	4,069
13	Morecambe (4)	0–2	Port Vale (3)	2,730
14	Hereford United (4)	0–0	Leeds United (3)	5,924
replay	Leeds United (3)	0–1	Hereford United (4)	11,315
15	Mansfield Town (4)	3–0	Lewes (6)	2,607
16	Gainsborough Trinity (6)	0–6	Hartlepool United (3)	2,402
17	Exeter City (5)	4–0	Stevenage Borough (5)	3,513
18	Oldham Athletic (3)	2–2	Doncaster Rovers (3)	4,280
replay	Doncaster Rovers (3)	1–2	Oldham Athletic (3)	4,340
19	Peterborough United (4)	4–1	Wrexham (4)	4,266
20	Halifax Town (5)	0–4	Burton Albion (5)	1,936
21	York City (5)	0–1	Havant & Waterlooville (6)	2,001
22	Harrogate Railway Athletic (8)	2–0	Droylsden (5)	884
23	Rushden & Diamonds (5)	3–1	Macclesfield Town (4)	1,759
24	Ware (8)	0–2	Kidderminster Harriers (5)	2,123
25	Walsall (3)	2–0	Shrewsbury Town (4)	4,972
26	Horsham (7)	4–1	Maidenhead United (6)	3,379
27	Altrincham (5)	1–2	Millwall (3)	2,457
28	Cheltenham Town (3)	1–1	Brighton & Hove Albion (3)	2,984
replay	Brighton & Hove Albion (3)	2–1	Cheltenham Town (3)	3,711
29	Stockport County (4)	1–1	Staines Town (7)	3,460
replay	Staines Town (7)	1–1	Stockport County (4)	2,860
Staines Town won 4–3 on penalties
30	Crewe Alexandra (3)	2–1	Milton Keynes Dons (4)	3,049
31	Lincoln City (4)	1–1	Nottingham Forest (3)	7,361
replay	Nottingham Forest (3)	3–1	Lincoln City (4)	6,783
32	Cambridge United (5)	2–1	Aldershot Town (5)	2,641
33	Notts County (4)	3–0	Histon (5)	4,344
34	Oxford United (5)	3–1	Northwich Victoria (5)	2,972
35	Billericay Town (7)	1–2	Swansea City (3)	2,334
36	Carlisle United (3)	1–1	Grimsby Town (4)	5,128
replay	Grimsby Town (4)	1–0	Carlisle United (3)	2,008
37	Eastbourne Borough (6)	0–4	Weymouth (5)	2,711
38	Chesterfield (4)	1–2	Tranmere Rovers (3)	4,296
39	Wycombe Wanderers (4)	1–2	Swindon Town (3)	3,332
40	Luton Town (3)	1–1	Brentford (4)	4,167
replay	Brentford (4)	0–2	Luton Town (3)	2,643

== Second round proper ==
- The draw was made on 11 November 2007.
- Ties were played over the weekend of 1 December 2007.
- Chasetown and Harrogate Railway Athletic were again the lowest-ranked teams in the round.

Tie no	Home team	Score	Away team	Attendance
1	Oxford United (5)	0–0	Southend United (3)	5,163
replay	Southend United (3)	3–0	Oxford United (5)	2,740
2	Swindon Town (3)	3–2	Forest Green Rovers (5)	7,588
3	Oldham Athletic (3)	1–0	Crewe Alexandra (3)	3,900
4	Northampton Town (3)	1–1	Walsall (3)	3,887
replay	Walsall (3)	1–0	Northampton Town (3)	3,066
5	Cambridge United (5)	1–0	Weymouth (5)	4,552
6	Millwall (3)	2–1	AFC Bournemouth (3)	4,495
7	Staines Town (7)	0–5	Peterborough United (4)	2,460
8	Bradford City (4)	0–3	Tranmere Rovers (3)	6,379
9	Torquay United (5)	0–2	Brighton & Hove Albion (3)	4,010
10	Notts County (4)	0–1	Havant & Waterlooville (6)	3,810
11	Dagenham & Redbridge (4)	3–1	Kidderminster Harriers (5)	1,493
12	Port Vale (3)	1–1	Chasetown (8)	5,875
replay	Chasetown (8)	1–0	Port Vale (3)	1,986
13	Bristol Rovers (3)	5–1	Rushden & Diamonds (5)	4,816
14	Huddersfield Town (3)	3–0	Grimsby Town (4)	6,729
15	Burton Albion (5)	1–1	Barnet (4)	2,769
replay	Barnet (4)	1–0	Burton Albion (5)	1,379
16	Bury (4)	1–0	Exeter City (5)	2,725
17	Luton Town (3)	1–0	Nottingham Forest (3)	5,758
18	Horsham (7)	1–1	Swansea City (3)	2,731
replay	Swansea City (3)	6–2	Horsham (7)	5,911
19	Hereford United (4)	2–0	Hartlepool United (3)	3,801
20	Harrogate Railway Athletic (8)	2–3	Mansfield Town (4)	1,486

== Third round proper ==
This round marks the first time Championship and Premier League (top-flight) teams play. Matches were played on the weekend of Saturday, 5 January 2008. The draw was made on 2 December 2007 at 15:15 GMT by Kevin Beattie and Sammy Nelson, adjudicated by Sir Trevor Brooking.

Involved in the third round draw for the first time ever were Havant & Waterlooville and Chasetown. Chasetown was the first eighth-tier team ever to reach this stage of the FA Cup. The draw itself produced few major ties, with the exception of Chelsea drawing their West London rivals, Queens Park Rangers, and Aston Villa drawing Manchester United as their third round opponents for the fourth time in seven seasons, and the second time in successive years.

Tie no	Home team	Score	Away team	Attendance
1	Preston North End (2)	1–0	Scunthorpe United (2)	4,616
2	Chasetown (8)	1–3	Cardiff City (2)	2,420
3	Colchester United (2)	1–3	Peterborough United (4)	4,003
4	Bolton Wanderers (1)	0–1	Sheffield United (2)	15,286
5	Blackburn Rovers (1)	1–4	Coventry City (2)	14,421
6	Brighton & Hove Albion (3)	1–2	Mansfield Town (4)	5,857
7	Walsall (3)	0–0	Millwall (3)	4,358
replay	Millwall (3)	2–1	Walsall (3)	4,645
8	Charlton Athletic (2)	1–1	West Bromwich Albion (2)	12,682
replay	West Bromwich Albion (2)	2–2	Charlton Athletic (2)	12,691
West Bromwich Albion won 4–3 on penalties
9	Watford (2)	2–0	Crystal Palace (2)	10,480
10	Luton Town (3)	1–1	Liverpool (1)	10,226
replay	Liverpool (1)	5–0	Luton Town (3)	41,446
11	Plymouth Argyle (2)	3–2	Hull City (2)	12,419
12	Aston Villa (1)	0–2	Manchester United (1)	33,630
13	Tranmere Rovers (3)	2–2	Hereford United (4)	6,909
replay	Hereford United (4)	1–0	Tranmere Rovers (3)	6,471
14	Tottenham Hotspur (1)	2–2	Reading (1)	35,243
replay	Reading (1)	0–1	Tottenham Hotspur (1)	22,130
15	Burnley (2)	0–2	Arsenal (1)	16,709
16	Bristol City (2)	1–2	Middlesbrough (1)	15,895
17	Fulham (1)	2–2	Bristol Rovers (3)	13,634
replay	Bristol Rovers (3)	0–0	Fulham (1)	11,882
Bristol Rovers won 5–3 on penalties
18	Huddersfield Town (3)	2–1	Birmingham City (1)	13,410
19	Swansea City (3)	1–1	Havant & Waterlooville (6)	8,761
replay	Havant & Waterlooville (6)	4–2	Swansea City (3)	4,400
20	Sunderland (1)	0–3	Wigan Athletic (1)	20,821
21	Southend United (3)	5–2	Dagenham & Redbridge (4)	6,393
22	Everton (1)	0–1	Oldham Athletic (3)	33,086
23	Derby County (1)	2–2	Sheffield Wednesday (2)	20,612
replay	Sheffield Wednesday (2)	1–1	Derby County (1)	18,020
Derby County won 4–2 on penalties
24	Southampton (2)	2–0	Leicester City (2)	20,094
25	West Ham United (1)	0–0	Manchester City (1)	33,806
replay	Manchester City (1)	1–0	West Ham United (1)	27,809
26	Ipswich Town (2)	0–1	Portsmouth (1)	23,446
27	Wolverhampton Wanderers (2)	2–1	Cambridge United (5)	15,340
28	Barnsley (2)	2–1	Blackpool (2)	8,276
29	Chelsea (1)	1–0	Queens Park Rangers (2)	41,289
30	Stoke City (2)	0–0	Newcastle United (1)	22,861
replay	Newcastle United (1)	4–1	Stoke City (2)	35,108
31	Swindon Town (3)	1–1	Barnet (4)	5,944
replay	Barnet (4)	1–1	Swindon Town (3)	2,810
Barnet won 2–0 on penalties
32	Norwich City (2)	1–1	Bury (4)	19,815
replay	Bury (4)	2–1	Norwich City (2)	4,146

== Fourth round proper ==
The draw was held at 13:30 GMT on Monday, 7 January 2008. The event was hosted by Sir Trevor Brooking, with Alan Cork and John Aldridge making the draw. Fourth-round matches were played on the weekend of 26 January 2008. For the first time since 1957, there were no replays for the fourth round as all ties were settled at the first game.

This was Havant & Waterlooville's first fourth-round appearance. They lost 5–2 to Liverpool at Anfield. After Havant's elimination, Bristol Rovers and Huddersfield Town became the lowest ranked teams left in the Cup. They competed in League One this season.

The BBC's Match of the Day broadcast live matches from two stadia that it had never broadcast live matches before; from Field Mill, Mansfield for Mansfield Town's match with Middlesbrough and from the JJB Stadium, Wigan for Wigan Athletic's match with defending champions Chelsea.

Tie no	Home team	Score	Away team	Attendance
1	Arsenal (1)	3–0	Newcastle United (1)	60,046
2	Coventry City (2)	2–1	Millwall (3)	17,268
3	Oldham Athletic (3)	0–1	Huddersfield Town (3)	12,749
4	Barnet (4)	0–1	Bristol Rovers (3)	5,190
5	Liverpool (1)	5–2	Havant & Waterlooville (6)	42,566
6	Southend United (3)	0–1	Barnsley (2)	7,212
7	Wigan Athletic (1)	1–2	Chelsea (1)	14,166
8	Derby County (1)	1–4	Preston North End (2)	17,344
9	Manchester United (1)	3–1	Tottenham Hotspur (1)	75,369
10	Portsmouth (1)	2–1	Plymouth Argyle (2)	19,612
11	Southampton (2)	2–0	Bury (4)	25,449
12	Hereford United (4)	1–2	Cardiff City (2)	6,885
13	Peterborough United (4)	0–3	West Bromwich Albion (2)	12,701
14	Mansfield Town (4)	0–2	Middlesbrough (1)	6,258
15	Sheffield United (2)	2–1	Manchester City (1)	20,800
16	Watford (2)	1–4	Wolverhampton Wanderers (2)	12,719

== Fifth round proper ==
The draw was held at 13:25 GMT on Monday, 28 January 2008. Sir Trevor Brooking hosted the event held at FA premises at Soho Square, where he was joined by Jimmy Case and Ray Wilkins, who conducted the draw. The matches were held over the weekend of 16 February 2008.

Tie no	Home team	Score	Away team	Attendance
1	Bristol Rovers (3)	1–0	Southampton (2)	11,920
2	Cardiff City (2)	2–0	Wolverhampton Wanderers (2)	15,339
3	Sheffield United (2)	0–0	Middlesbrough (1)	22,210
replay	Middlesbrough (1)	1–0	Sheffield United (2)	28,108
4	Liverpool (1)	1–2	Barnsley (2)	42,449
5	Manchester United (1)	4–0	Arsenal (1)	75,550
6	Preston North End (2)	0–1	Portsmouth (1)	11,840
7	Coventry City (2)	0–5	West Bromwich Albion (2)	28,163
8	Chelsea (1)	3–1	Huddersfield Town (3)	41,324

== Sixth round proper ==
The draw was held on 18 February 2008 at 13:25 GMT at Soho Square. The draw was conducted by Geoff Thomas and Mark Bright, overseen by Sir Trevor Brooking.

For the second round in a row, the only all-Premier League tie of the round involved Manchester United, who were defeated at home by Portsmouth. This was Portsmouth's first win in an official match at Old Trafford for 50 years. Barnsley, who had already knocked out Liverpool in the previous round, produced a similar result in the sixth round, beating Chelsea 1–0 at Oakwell. West Bromwich Albion defeated Bristol Rovers away at the Memorial Stadium, whilst Cardiff City caused a third shock of the weekend by beating Premier League team Middlesbrough. There were no replays. The sixth-round matches were played on the weekend of 8 March 2008.

8 March 2008
12:45

Manchester United (1)	0–1	Portsmouth (1)
	Report	Muntari 78' (pen.)

Old Trafford, Manchester
Attendance: 75,463
Referee: Martin Atkinson (West Yorkshire)

8 March 2008
17:30

Barnsley (2)	1–0	Chelsea (1)
Odejayi 67'	Report

Oakwell, Barnsley
Attendance: 22,410
Referee: Steve Bennett (Kent)

9 March 2008
14:00

Middlesbrough (1)	0–2	Cardiff City (2)
	Report	Whittingham 9'; Johnson 23'

Riverside Stadium, Middlesbrough
Attendance: 32,986
Referee: Mike Dean (Cheshire)

9 March 2008
18:00

Bristol Rovers (3)	1–5	West Bromwich Albion (2)
Coles 31'	Report	Morrison 16'; Miller 30', 69', 85'; Phillips 73'

Memorial Stadium, Bristol
Attendance: 12,011
Referee: Mark Clattenburg (County Durham)

== Semi-finals ==
The draw was held on 10 March 2008 at 13:25 GMT at Soho Square with Bryan Robson making the draw. Both semi-finals were played at Wembley Stadium and held on 5 April and 6 April 2008. There was only one club from the top flight (Portsmouth) in the draw for the first time since 1908.

5 April 2008
12:15

West Bromwich Albion (2)	0–1	Portsmouth (1)
	Report	Kanu 54'

Wembley Stadium, London
Attendance: 83,584
Referee: Howard Webb (Sheffield & Hallamshire)

6 April 2008
16:00

Barnsley (2)	0–1	Cardiff City (2)
	Report	Ledley 9'

Wembley Stadium, London
Attendance: 82,752
Referee: Alan Wiley (Staffordshire)

== Final ==
The final was held at Wembley Stadium on 17 May 2008, and Portsmouth's 1–0 victory gave them their first major trophy for 58 years and their first FA Cup for 69 years. It was also the first time that the winning team's manager (Harry Redknapp) was an Englishman since Joe Royle guided Everton to FA Cup glory 13 years earlier as well as being the first time a club from outside the Big Four of English football won the Cup since the aforementioned Everton side in 1995.

17 May 2008
15:00 BST

Cardiff City (2)	0–1	Portsmouth (1)
	Report	Kanu 37'

Wembley Stadium, London
Attendance: 89,874
Referee: Mike Dean (Cheshire)

Cardiff City	Portsmouth

== Media coverage ==
In the United Kingdom, the BBC were the free to air broadcasters for the seventh consecutive season while Sky Sports were the subscription broadcasters for the twentieth consecutive season.

Round	Date	Teams	Kick-off	Channels	
Round	Date	Teams	Kick-off	Digital	TV
First Round	11 November	Torquay United v Yeovil Town	3:20pm	—N/a	BBC One
Second Round	2 December	Harrogate Railway v Mansfield Town	1:10pm	—N/a	BBC One
Sixth Round	8 March	Manchester United v Portsmouth	12:45pm	—N/a	Sky Sports 1
Sixth Round	8 March	Barnsley vs Chelsea	5:15pm	BBC iPlayer	BBC One
Sixth Round	9 March	Middlesbrough vs Cardiff City	2:00pm	BBC iPlayer	BBC One
Sixth Round	9 March	Bristol Rovers v West Bromwich Albion	6:00pm	BBC iPlayer	BBC One
Semi-finals	5 April	West Bromwich Albion v Portsmouth	12:15pm	BBC iPlayer	BBC One
Semi-finals	6 April	Barnsley v Cardiff City	4:00pm	—N/a	Sky Sports 1
Final	17 May	Cardiff City v Portsmouth	3:00pm	BBC iPlayer	BBC One
Final	17 May	Cardiff City v Portsmouth	3:00pm	—N/a	Sky Sports 1

The matches shown live on the BBC were:

- Aston Villa 0-2 Manchester United (R3)
- Burnley 0-2 Arsenal (R3)
- Stoke City 0-0 Newcastle United (R3)
- Manchester City 1-0 West Ham United (R3 Replay)
- Mansfield Town 1-2 Middlesbrough (R4)
- Wigan Athletic 1-2 Chelsea (R4)
- Manchester United 3-1 Tottenham Hotspur (R4)
- Bristol Rovers 1-0 Southampton (R5)
- Manchester United 4-0 Arsenal (R5)
- Sheffield United 0-0 Middlesbrough (R5)
- Middlesbrough 1-0 Sheffield United (R5 Replay)

The matches shown live on Sky Sports were:

- Hereford United 0-0 Leeds United (R1)
- Staines Town 1-1 Stockport County (R1 Replay)
- Horsham 1-1 Swansea City (R2)
- Swansea City 6-2 Horsham (R2 Replay)
- Luton Town 1-1 Liverpool (R3)
- Liverpool 5-0 Luton Town (R3 Replay)
- Sheffield United 2-1 Manchester City (R4)
- Preston North End 0-1 Portsmouth (R5)
