= 2002–03 Western Football League =

Western Football League
- Season: 2002–03
- Champions: Team Bath (Premier Division); Torrington (Division One)

The 2002–03 season was the 101st in the history of the Western Football League.

The league champions for the first time in their history were Team Bath, who were promoted to the Southern League. The champions of Division One were Torrington.

== Final tables ==
=== Premier Division ===
The Premier Division was reduced from 20 to 18 clubs after Taunton Town were promoted to the Southern League, Bristol Manor Farm and Westbury United were relegated to the First Division, and Yeovil Town Reserves also left. Two clubs joined:

- Bath City Reserves, runners-up in the First Division.
- Frome Town, champions of the First Division.

Pos	Team	Pld	W	D	L	GF	GA	GD	Pts	Promotion
1	Team Bath (C, P)	34	27	3	4	109	28	+81	84	Promoted to the Southern League
2	Brislington	34	22	7	5	71	28	+43	73	
3	Bideford	34	21	7	6	105	35	+70	70	
4	Backwell United	34	21	4	9	70	33	+37	67	
5	Paulton Rovers	34	18	9	7	68	35	+33	63	
6	Bridgwater Town	34	17	8	9	71	43	+28	59	
7	Bath City Reserves	34	14	5	15	66	57	+9	47	Left at the end of the season
8	Melksham Town	34	12	7	15	65	68	−3	43	
9	Odd Down	34	12	6	16	49	67	−18	42	
10	Keynsham Town	34	11	7	16	55	65	−10	40	
11	Frome Town	34	11	7	16	49	62	−13	40	
12	Bishop Sutton	34	11	5	18	57	83	−26	38	
13	Dawlish Town	34	11	5	18	47	107	−60	38	
14	Bridport	34	9	8	17	40	54	−14	35	
15	Barnstaple Town	34	8	8	18	41	68	−27	32	
16	Welton Rovers	34	9	5	20	40	99	−59	32	
17	Elmore	34	8	7	19	45	81	−36	31	
18	Devizes Town	34	6	8	20	40	75	−35	26	

(C) Champions; (P) Promoted

=== First Division ===
The First Division was reduced from 20 to 19 clubs after Frome Town and Bath City Reserves were promoted to the Premier Division, Warminster Town were relegated to the Wiltshire League, and two clubs joined:

- Bristol Manor Farm, relegated from the Premier Division.
- Westbury United, relegated from the Premier Division.

Pos	Team	Pld	W	D	L	GF	GA	GD	Pts	Promotion
1	Torrington (C, P)	36	27	5	4	113	47	+66	86	Promoted to the Premier Division
2	Exmouth Town (P)	36	26	7	3	83	29	+54	85	Promoted to the Premier Division
3	Westbury United	36	20	8	8	92	65	+27	68	
4	Hallen	36	19	6	11	70	56	+14	63	
5	Calne Town	36	16	9	11	62	43	+19	57	
6	Clyst Rovers	36	17	5	14	67	55	+12	56	
7	Willand Rovers	36	16	6	14	63	53	+10	54	
8	Bitton	36	13	10	13	50	48	+2	49	
9	Shepton Mallet	36	13	10	13	53	55	−2	49	
10	Chard Town	36	12	10	14	59	60	−1	46	
11	Bristol Manor Farm	36	14	4	18	56	71	−15	46	
12	Wellington	36	12	8	16	49	57	−8	44	
13	Larkhall Athletic	36	13	4	19	48	73	−25	43	
14	Cadbury Heath	36	10	11	15	49	61	−12	41	
15	Street	36	13	7	16	59	81	−22	40 (Note: Street had six points deducted.)	
16	Corsham Town	36	8	12	16	44	51	−7	36	
17	Weston St Johns	36	9	4	23	54	76	−22	31	
18	Ilfracombe Town	36	7	9	20	47	85	−38	30	
19	Minehead Town	36	7	5	24	34	86	−52	26	

Rules for classification: The system of using goal difference to separate two teams tied on points was used. The points system: 3 points for a win, 1 point for a draw and 0 points for losing.
(C) Champions; (P) Promoted
