= Exeter City F.C.'s 1914 tour of South America =

1914 British football club tour in South America

Exeter City 1914 tour of South America
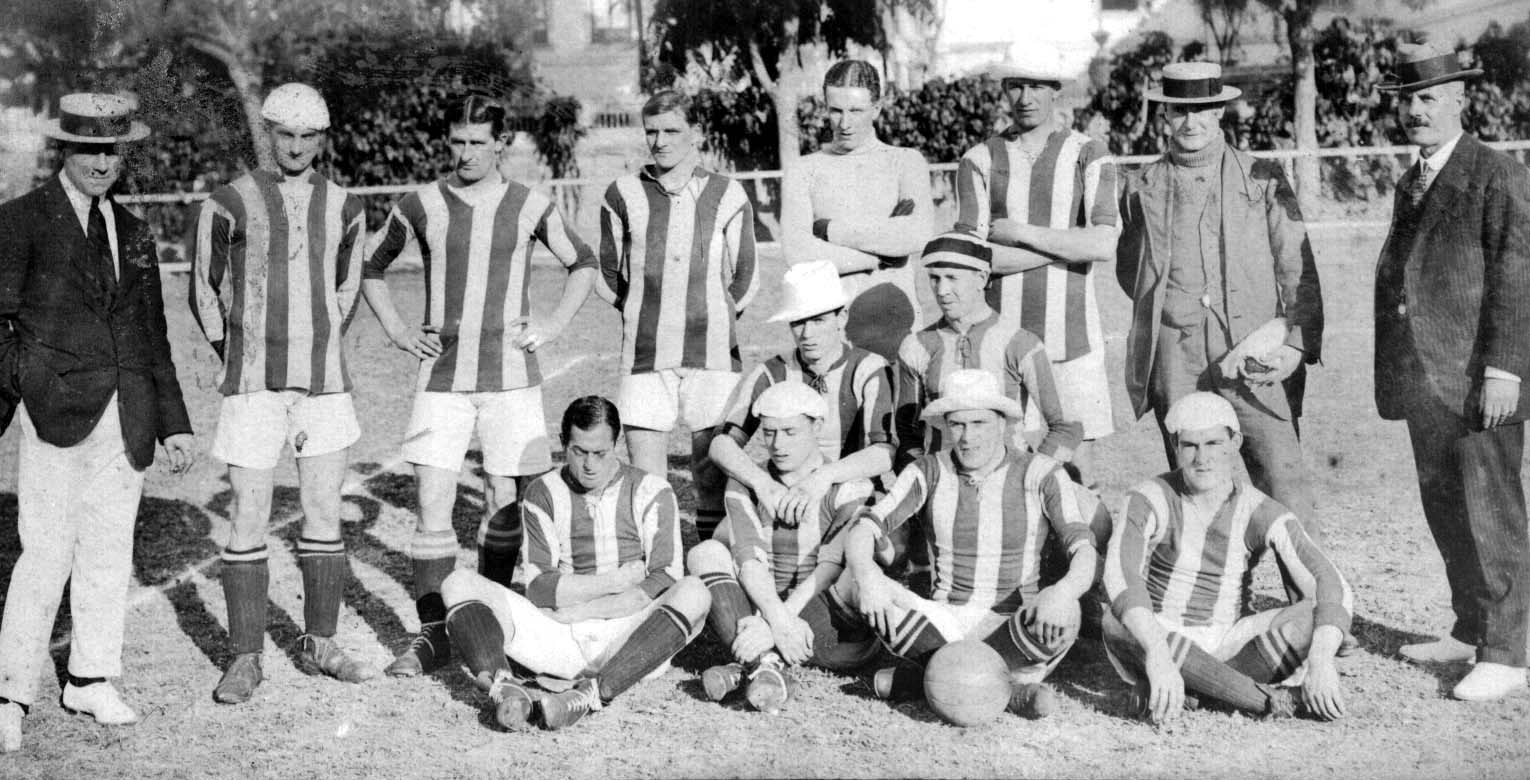
- The Exeter City team that played v the Brazil national team
- Date: Jun–Jul 1914
- Duration: Two months
- Venue: Various
- Location: Argentina Brazil
- Type: Exhibition games
- Theme: British football clubs tours to South America
- Participants: Exeter City F.C.

Exeter City's tour of South America in 1914 was the ninth tour of the continent by a British football team and is most notable for having resulted in what is considered to be the Brazil national team's first ever match.

== Background and Departure ==
Originally, it was Tottenham Hotspur who were offered to tour Argentina, as they had done in 1909, but the club declined the Argentine Football Association's offer; citing the excessive travelling as the reason.

In February 1914, The Herald reported that City had agreed to "£20 for each member of the party with first class return fare and all hotel and travelling expenses for account of the AFA" to go on tour, the same terms offered to Tottenham Hotspur. According to the AFA's minute book for the meeting of 26 February 1914, the item heading 'Team Exeter City' replaced that which had read 'Team de Inglaterra'.

Club chairman Michael McGahey, directors Fred Parkhouse and George Middleweek (who paid for his own trip) and their wives, and fifteen players set sail in May 1914. Manager Arthur Chadwick was too ill to join the party, hence why McGahey travelled. The boat trip to Argentina lasted three weeks, stopping off at Vigo, Madeira, Rio de Janeiro, Santos and Montevideo along the way. Yellow fever prevented passengers from landing in Recife and Salvador da Bahia.

== Arrival in Brazil ==
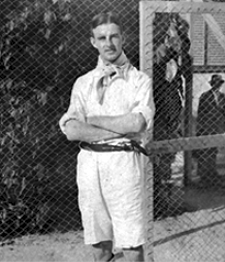
Harry Robinson was instrumental in organising Exeter City's matches in Brazil

Some sources suggest that City had originally only planned to play friendlies in Argentina, with the fixtures in Brazil being organised while the club were on tour. However, research has shown that McGahey had already discussed the possibility of playing matches in Brazil as early as in May. McGahey wrote of an appointment he had with a Mr Harry Robinson, explaining that once the ship landed in Rio de Janeiro, he phoned the shore from the boat, asking Robinson to join him on board. Once together, McGahey explained how Robinson was the brother of one of his clients (who also happened to attend City's matches) and that they discussed playing "a match or matches on [their] return journey to Rio" and that the terms that were mentioned were satisfactory.

While in Rio, the players drove to Paysandu (Harry Robinson's team) and Fluminense in motor vehicles provided by both clubs. At Fluminense, the players had a kickabout for an hour. McGahey was introduced to two Fluminense officials, Mário Pernambuco (of the Ground Committee) and Marcondes Ferraz (a board member), who, together with Harry Robinson, suggested that City break their return trip in Rio by staying five days and playing three matches. After City left Rio for Santos, Paysandu and Fluminense directors met to establish dates and prepared the offer of a contract.

After the team made landfall in Santos, the club decided to hold a training session on the beach, having turned their noses up at the facilities of a local club, and the whole team was subsequently put under arrest for bathing in the sea. McGahey wrote to the Express & Echo:

The sands were fine and hard, and the boys had some very useful sprints. A little ball practice, and after this was over a dip followed. They, of course, wore their full bathing costumes, and even if there were any persons on the beach, there could be nothing to object to in the slightest. It is quite true that about half a mile away there were some houses. Just as I was getting the boys out of the water to dress, down came a local policeman ... The old buffer, who was armed with a sword and pistol, and who, we found afterwards, had been afraid to approach us before for fear we were armed, seemed pacified. I gave him a cigarette, when down marched Sergeant with one of the villa residents, who had apparently complained. Then the talking and gesticulating commenced - shoulders shrugging, hands flourishing, eyebrows raising, and tongues going. We gathered that we were all under arrest, and had to accompany these two men to the local Chief of Police. Naturally, at first, we were inclined to cut up rough, but I advised the boys to take it quietly. I offered, as I was in control, to accompany him provided the others were allowed to return to the ship, but apparently he wanted the lot. I thought it was merely a question of local corruption, and that they merely wanted a fine. Of course, the lads all took it as a joke, and would not have missed it for anything - the only fear was that, as the boat sailed at 2, and it was then 12.30, we should miss it. We accordingly all boarded a tram-car, with the sergeant and policeman in charge of us and the fellow who had complained.

— Michael McGahey, Express & Echo in "Have you ever played Brazil?: The story of Exeter City's 1914 tour of South America"

Once both sides had been heard, the 'Commissioner of Police' dismissed the complaint and the travelling party made it to the ship in time. The ship arrived in Montevideo early in the morning of 10 June. Mr Williams, the AFA secretary, and Mr MacKinnon, the AFA treasurer, met up with the travelling party there, having undertaking a nine-hour journey by steamer from Buenos Aires, with the purpose of welcoming City and assisting them in their landing.

== Tour of Argentina ==
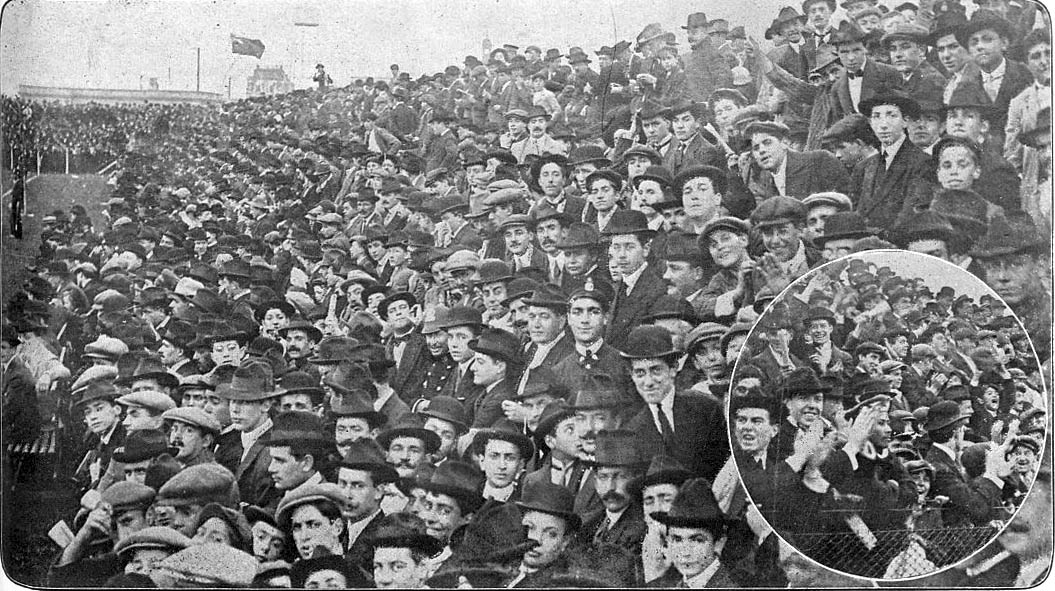
The crowd at Racing Club Stadium during the Combinado Norte v Exeter City match

Once in Argentina, City played eight games. The first was a 3–0 defeat to "Combinado Norte" at Racing Club's stadium in Avellaneda on 14 June 1914. After being allowed to train at Belgrano Athletic Club, City beat Combinado Sur 3–0 on 21 June, again at Racing Club's stadium, with goals from William Hunter, Harry Holt and Billy Lovett. On 24 June, City beat Racing Club 2–0, Holt and Fred Marshall with the goals. This game was marred by a bizarre incident however, as when City took the lead Racing Club's secretary threatened the referee with a revolver, attempting to persuade him to send off Lagan (who had kicked Ochoa in the stomach, meaning he had to be carried off).

After this, there was also a problem with the scheduling, as City were due to play Liga Argentina on the 28th and a game in Rosario on the 29th. However, the Rosario League Committee had not been consulted and refused to accept the arrangements, resenting the fact that their game would be the day after one of the main fixtures of the tour and claiming that City would not be able to produce their best form. The games were rescheduled, with the Rosario game now being played on the 28th, a less important scratch XI on the 29th and the Liga Argentina game was postponed to 9 July.

City beat Liga Rosarina 3-1 (Fred Whittaker 2, Marshall) on 28 June at C.A. Argentino's stadium. The party then took the overnight train back to Buenos Aires. The fifth game of the tour saw City beat Combinados 5-0 (Whittaker 3, Lovett, Jimmy Lagan), again at Racing Club. On 9 July, City beat Liga Argentina 3-0 (Hunter 2, Goodwin) at Racing Club, before drawing 0–0 against a representative team of Argentinians (Argentinos) on 11 July at Ferro Carril Oeste's ground in Caballito. The final game in Argentina was again against Liga Argentina at Racing Club on 12 July, a 3-1 (Lovett 2, Goodwin) win. This game saw many changes to City's XI, with trainer Charlie Pratt having to play in goal due to an injury to Dick Pym and Reg Loram having influenza. Injuries to Holt and Marshall also meant reserve defender Gus Harding was selected to play.

Newspapers in Argentina were left disappointed with City's performances during the tour, Tribuna describing them as "the most mediocre team of professionals sent out by the FA from the home of football", and the Buenos Aires Herald complaining that the Grecians were not "sufficiently superior".

== Tour of Brazil ==
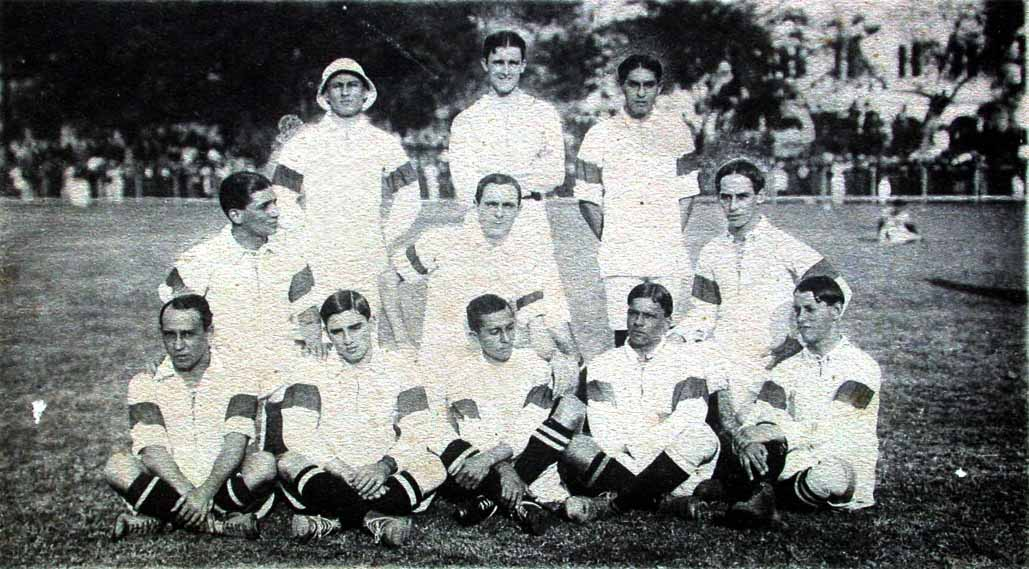
The first Brazil national team, 1914

When the idea of playing three extra matches was discussed with McGahey on 8 June, what Harry Robinson and the Fluminense officials had in mind were games involving players based in Rio de Janeiro. In early July, the Brazilian press were reproducing reports from City's matches in Argentina. On 2 July, O Estado de S. Paulo announced that Fluminense and Paysandu had agreed, with McGahey, a contract for the games to go ahead, just above the report of the Racing game. City would be the first team of professionals to play in Brazil. Originally, it was hoped that City would also play a game in São Paulo, however, time constraints meant that it was not possible. The original programme was for City to play Rio English (known as Estrangeiros) on 18 July, Brasileiros on 19 July and the Cariocas (known as Rio de Janeiro) on 21 July. These last two were eventually switched. It was at this point that the Liga Metropolitana approached the APEA with the proposal that the Brasileiros and Estrangeiros games include Paulista players.

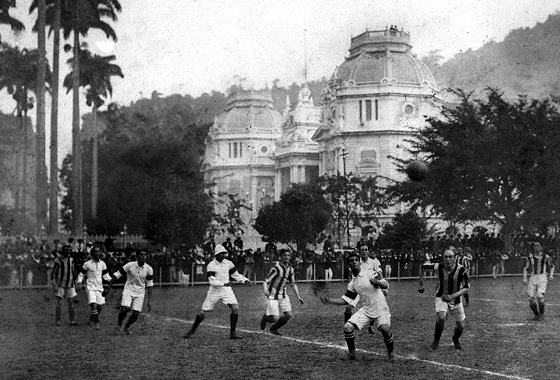
Exeter City playing the Brazil national team in Rio de Janeiro

City's ship landed in Rio de Janeiro on 17 July. On 18 July, City beat Rio English 3-0 (Hunter, Holt, Lovett). The game was very one-sided, with City keeper Reg Loram (Pym missed the remainder of the tour through injury), the only amateur in the team, not being tested until late in the game. On 19 July, it was announced in the news that Paulista players would travel to Rio. Some had had difficulty getting time off work, so APEA's treasurer travelled to Rio to change the dates of the final two games in order for three Brasileiros from São Paulo -Rubens Salles (Paulistano), Xavier (Ipiranga) and Arthur Friedenreich (Ipiranga)- to play in a league match and catch the overnight train. Later that day, City beat Rio de Janeiro 5-3 (Charlie Pratt 2, Lagan, Goodwin, Hunter). Harry Welfare had put the hosts 3-1 ahead, at which point City became more physical, something which was criticised by the Correio da Manhã. On 21 July, City lost 2–0 to Brasileiros (a selection of Brazilian players from Rio and São Paulo). During the game, Lagan and Fort walked off the pitch, but were convinced to return to the field and finish the game. This is considered to be the Brazil national team's first ever game. All three games were played at Fluminense's Estádio das Laranjeiras. Harry Robinson played in the first two games and refereed the last one, making sixteen saves in the first game for Rio English.

On 27 September, seven members from the side that defeated City represented Brazil against Argentina in the Copa Roca match, which Brazil won 1–0. The Gazeta do São Paulo reported in 1928 that City had expressed, through diplomatic channels, a desire to return to Brazil. However, the enquiry came to nothing.

== Match results ==
Exeter City
Date	Venue	Opponent	Score
14 Jun 1914	Racing	Combinado Norte	0–1
21 Jun 1914	Racing	Combinado Sur	3–0
24 Jun 1914	Racing	Racing	2–0
28 Jun 1914	Club Argentino (R)	Liga Rosarina	3–1
29 Jun 1914	Racing	Combined team	5–0
9 Jul 1914	Racing	Liga Argentina	3–0
11 Jul 1914	Ferro C. Oeste	Argentina	0–0
12 Jul 1914	Racing	Liga Argentina	3–1
18 Jul 1914	das Laranjeiras	English of Rio	3–0
19 Jul 1914	das Laranjeiras	Rio de Janeiro	5–3
21 Jul 1914	das Laranjeiras	Brazil	0–2

Balance
Pl	W	D	L	Gs	Gc
11	8	1	2	27	8

== Centenary Celebrations ==
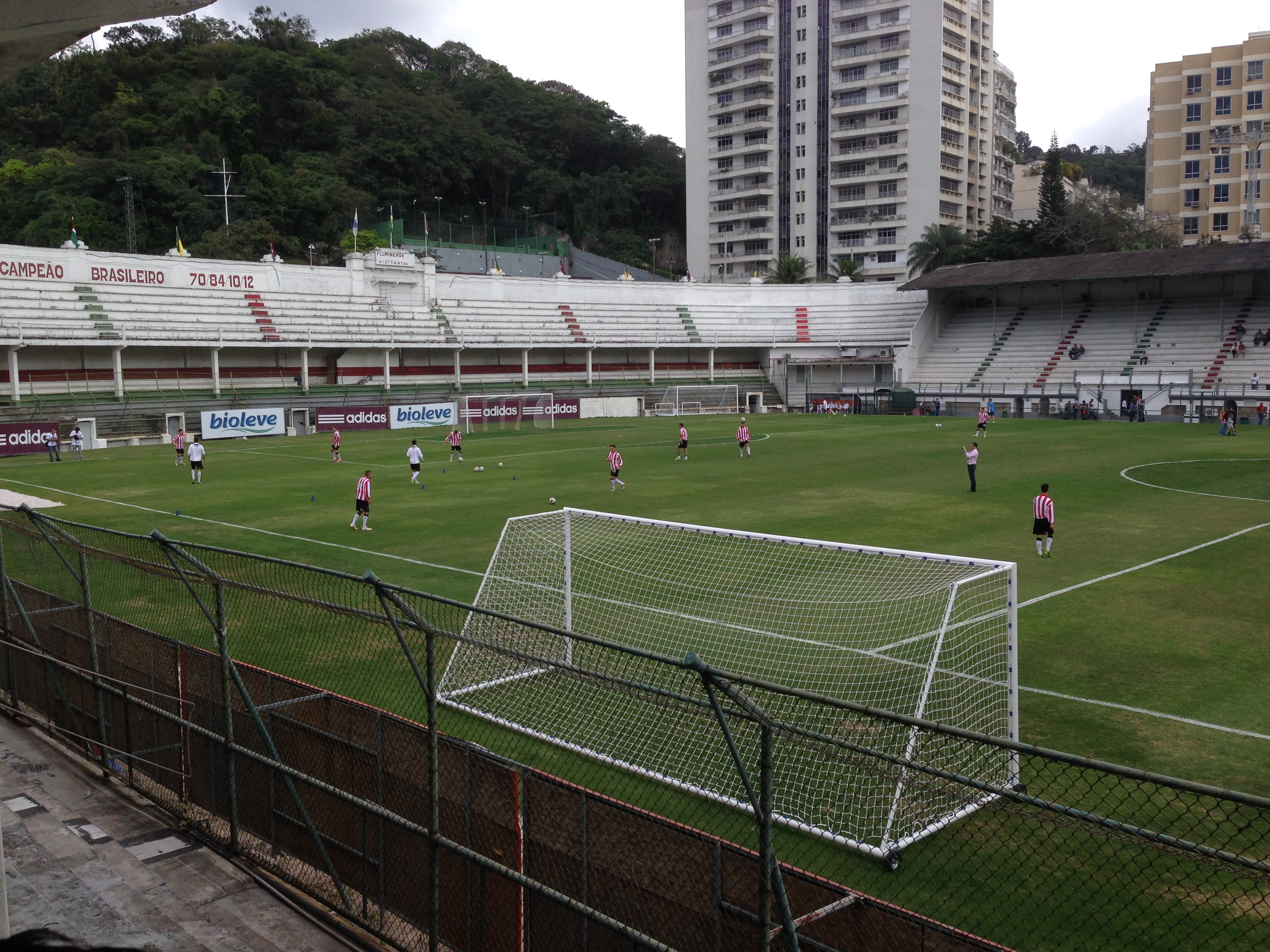
Exeter City warming up at Estádio das Laranjeiras ahead of their pre-season friendly against Fluminense U23s in 2014.

On 26 July 2013, it was announced that City would play a friendly match against Fluminense in July 2014 to commemorate the centennial of the Brazil national team's first ever game. Talking about the trip, then club captain Scot Bennett said:

"I know bits and bobs, I've read a lot in the newspapers recently, learning what the game was all about, with Exeter playing Brazil a hundred years ago and being the first team to do that. I know that there is a lot of history there and I think that both the club and the players are going to be a massive part of Brazil's history for a long time."

"It is one thing to lead your team out on a matchday, when you are over there and are part of something so big, coming out in a big stadium and against such a big team, there's always going to be an added emphasis on that. It's definitely added to the excitement for me and around 160 fans are travelling over and making a big effort to come over. Hopefully we can put on a good show for them."

"As a young boy you dream you can play in big stadiums, full stadiums, against good sides, but when you're playing in League Two it does not happen week in, week out, going over to Brazil, where the World Cup has just taken place, is definitely going to be a dream come true for me and all of the lads."

— Scot Bennett, BBC Sport

Whilst in Brazil, City played three pre-season friendlies: a 0–0 draw against Fluminense under-23s, a 2–1 win over Tupi and a 3–1 win over Rio Cricket e Associação Atlética. Following the friendly against Fluminense under-23s, the City team and supporters were invited to watch Fluminense's first team in league action against Santos. That game finished 1–0 to Fluminense.

However, the trip to Brazil took its toll on City's squad. A sickness bug within the camp meant then manager Paul Tisdale had to name himself on the bench for the club's opening game of the season against Portsmouth.

== See also ==
- British football clubs tours to South America
