= 1914 in Brazilian football =

Football in Brazil
- Season: 1914

The following article presents a summary of the 1914 football (soccer) season in Brazil, which was the 13th season of competitive football in the country.

== Campeonato Paulista ==
In 1914 there were two different editions of the Campeonato Paulista. One was organized by the Associação Paulista de Esportes Atléticos (APEA) while the other one was organized by the Liga Paulista de Foot-Ball (LPF).

=== APEA's Campeonato Paulista ===
Final Standings

Position	Team	Points	Played	Won	Drawn	Lost	For	Against	Difference
1	AA São Bento	15	10	7	1	2	21	16	5
2	Paulistano	14	10	7	0	3	22	15	7
3	Mackenzie	11	10	5	1	4	20	14	6
4	Ypiranga-SP	11	10	4	3	3	19	15	4
5	Scottish Wanderers	5	10	2	1	7	13	23	−10
6	AA das Palmeiras	4	10	1	2	7	11	23	−12

São Bento declared as the APEA's Campeonato Paulista champions.

=== LPF's Campeonato Paulista ===
Final Standings

Position	Team	Points	Played	Won	Drawn	Lost	For	Against	Difference
1	Corinthians	16	8	8	0	0	30	7	23
2	Campos Elíseos	8	7	4	0	3	12	14	−2
3	Minas Gerais	6	7	2	2	3	9	12	−3
4	SC Internacional de São Paulo	5	8	2	1	5	13	19	−6
5	SC Luzitano	3	8	1	1	6	6	18	−12
6	Germânia	–	–	–	–	–	–	–	–
6	Hydecroft	–	–	–	–	–	–	–	–

Germânia and Hydecroft matches were canceled, as both clubs abandoned the competition.

Corinthians declared as the LPF's Campeonato Paulista champions.

== State championship champions ==
State	Champion
Amazonas	Manaos Athletic
Bahia	Internacional-BA
Rio de Janeiro (DF)	Flamengo
São Paulo	AA São Bento (by APEA); Corinthians (by LPF)

== Brazil national team ==
The Brazil national football team played its first matches in 1914, which are displayed in the following table.

Date	Opposition	Result	Score	Brazil scorers	Competition
July 21, 1914	(England) Exeter City	W	2–0	Osman, Oswaldo Gomes	International Friendly (unofficial match)
September 20, 1914	Argentina	L	0–3	–	International Friendly
September 24, 1914	(Argentina) Columbian FC	W	3–1	Barthô (2), Friedenreich	International Friendly (unofficial match)
September 27, 1914	Argentina	W	1–0	Rubens Salles	Roca Cup
