= History of Exeter City F.C. =

History of an English football club

Chart of yearly performance of Exeter City in the Football League.

Exeter City F.C. is an English football club based in Exeter, Devon. The club was formed in 1901 as St. Sidwell's United and played in the Southern League from 1908 until 1920, when that league's top division was absorbed into The Football League as its new Division Three. The club was the first ever team to play the Brazil national team in 1914, a match which was commemorated in a 2014 friendly game against Fluminense.

City took 60 years to achieve their first ever promotion, finishing fourth in Division Four in the 1963–64 season. Since then, the club have mostly oscillated between the third and fourth divisions, spending five years in the Conference between 2003 and 2008; having been promoted a further four times (in 1976–77, 1989–90, 2007–08 and 2008–09) and relegated five times (in 1965–66, 1983–84, 1993–94, 2002–03 and 2011–12).

Exeter City have never played above the third tier of English football, and are the club that have played the most seasons in the third tier without ever making the second tier in England. The club's only major title came in the 1989–90 season, when Terry Cooper led City to the Fourth Division title.

== Formation ==
Originally, it was believed that, following a friendly match between Exeter United and St. Sidwell's United, the two teams merged to become what is now known as Exeter City.

However, new light was shed on Exeter City's formation in 2014, when Aidan Hamilton's book Have you ever played Brazil?: The story of Exeter City's 1914 tour of South America was published. The actual story is that Exeter United, who had formed in 1896 and were the main team in Exeter, struggled for players in 1902 and could not play at St James Park, "as the building erected there for the Co-operative Society was still standing and in use". On 25 October 1902, Exeter United lost 3–0 to St. Sidwell's United, who were formed in 1901 to challenge Exeter United's dominance in Exeter, at Blackboy Road. On 27 October, regarding who the leading team in Exeter was, "Linesman" wrote in the Western Times:

Nominally, the distinction belongs to Exeter United. Not only does that organisation bear the City's name, but it had up to last Saturday held undisputed superiority over the other Exeter Clubs. Now, however, it has been displaced from its position by that wonderfully promising Club, St. Sidwell's. The latter, to speak of the team in plural, have now the strongest possible claim, viz., success on the field, to the title. It will not, I think, be questioned by the staunchest supporter of Exeter that the Saints proved themselves a distinctly smarter and more scientific side in the game which ended in their favour by three goals to nil. They are heartily congratulated upon an achievement that will rank as not only the most notable, but also as the most pleasing in the history of the Club. The result is one that should have a very beneficial influence on Exeter football. The immediate effect should be two-fold in its character – St. Sidwell's should be greatly encouraged in their laudable effort to raise the standard of the game, and Exeter United should learn by this sharp lesson of experience that disjointed individualism will always be beaten by intelligent combination.

— "Linesman", Western Times in "Have you ever played Brazil?: The story of Exeter City's 1914 tour of South America"

It seems, however, that Exeter United never recovered. The loss to St. Sidwell's United was one of the last games they played. In February 1903, they were not listed in the first round of Devon Cup ties and there was also a fixture between their 'Masters XI' and North Devon School. When the participating clubs for the 1903–04 East Devon Senior League was announced, United were not listed. In August 1903, St. Sidwell's United, who had the previous season been crowned Junior champions and had beaten 'Rest of the League' 10–2, began training at St James Park. At this point, they were considered the 'premier club in Exeter' according to the Devon Evening Express. Soon after, they began fielding several former Exeter United players, with St. Sidwell's United having effectively defeated and absorbed them. In the edition of 31 August 1904 of the Devon Evening Express, St. Sidwell's United "decided to take the title of "Exeter City" – a decidedly more suitable name for this strong combination".

== Early years ==
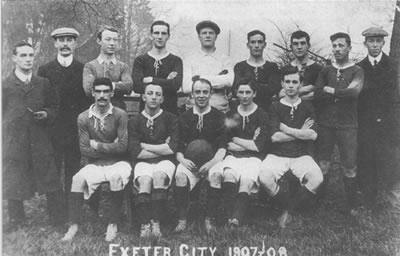
A team photo of Exeter City in 1907–08

Shortly after becoming Exeter City, the club entered the East Devon League. City's first ever competitive game was a 2–1 win over the 110th Battery of the Royal Artillery, in front of a crowd of 600 fans. The club quickly switched to the stronger Plymouth and District League until 1908, when City became a professional football club and joined the Southern League. City failed to win any honours during their initial seven-year spell in the Southern League, but when both Nottingham Forest and Southampton turned down the Football Association's request to tour South America, the Grecians were asked to fill in. According to Hamilton's research, however, it was Tottenham Hotspur who declined the offer to tour Argentina, citing the excessive travelling as the reason.

City originally adopted the green and white quarters kit of St. Sidwell's United. For the 1907–08 season, the club changed to green shirts and, for the beginning of the 1910–11 season, wore green shirts with white sleeves. However, on 12 November 1910, this was changed to red and white vertical stripes for the 0–0 home draw against West Ham United. According to legend, City dropped the green shirts because, after a poor start to the season, they believed the colour was unlucky. The club have worn red and white vertical stripes since, with the occasional variation.

== Tour of South America (1914) ==
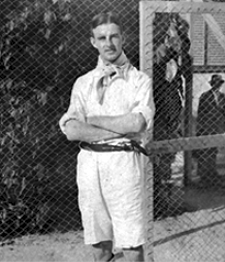
Harry Robinson was instrumental in organising Exeter City's matches in Brazil

In February 1914, The Herald reported that City had agreed to "£20 for each member of the party with first class return fare and all hotel and travelling expenses for account of the AFA" to go on tour, the same terms offered to Tottenham Hotspur. According to the AFA's minute book for the meeting of 26 February 1914, the item heading 'Team Exeter City' replaced that which had read 'Team de Inglaterra'. Club chairman Michael McGahey, directors Fred Parkhouse and George Middleweek (who paid for his own trip) and their wives, and fifteen players set sail in May 1914. Manager Arthur Chadwick was too ill to join the party, hence why McGahey travelled. The boat trip to Argentina lasted three weeks, stopping off at Vigo, Madeira, Rio de Janeiro, Santos and Montevideo along the way. Yellow fever prevented passengers from landing in Recife and Salvador da Bahia.

Some sources suggest that City had originally only planned to play friendlies in Argentina, with the fixtures in Brazil being organised while the club were on tour. However, Hamilton's research has shown that McGahey had already discussed the possibility of playing matches in Brazil as early as in May. McGahey wrote of an appointment he had with a Mr Harry Robinson, explaining that once the ship landed in Rio de Janeiro, he phoned the shore from the boat, asking Robinson to join him on board. Once together, McGahey explained how Robinson was the brother of one of his clients (who also happened to attend City's matches) and that they discussed playing "a match or matches on [their] return journey to Rio" and that the terms that were mentioned were satisfactory.

While in Rio, the players drove to Paysandu (Harry Robinson's team) and Fluminense in motor vehicles provided by both clubs. At Fluminense, the players had a kickabout for an hour. McGahey was introduced to two Fluminense officials, Mário Pernambuco (of the Ground Committee) and Marcondes Ferraz (a board member), who, together with Harry Robinson, suggested that City break their return trip in Rio by staying five days and playing three matches.

After City left Rio for Santos, Paysandu and Fluminense directors met to establish dates and prepared the offer of a contract. Once in Santos, the whole team was put under arrest for bathing in the sea. McGahey wrote to the Express and Echo:

The sands were fine and hard, and the boys had some very useful sprints. A little ball practice, and after this was over a dip followed. They, of course, wore their full bathing costumes, and even if there were any persons on the beach, there could be nothing to object to in the slightest. It is quite true that about half a mile away there were some houses. Just as I was getting the boys out of the water to dress, down came a local policeman ... The old buffer, who was armed with a sword and pistol, and who, we found afterwards, had been afraid to approach us before for fear we were armed, seemed pacified. I gave him a cigarette, when down marched Sergeant with one of the villa residents, who had apparently complained. Then the talking and gesticulating commenced – shoulders shrugging, hands flourishing, eyebrows raising, and tongues going. We gathered that we were all under arrest, and had to accompany these two men to the local Chief of Police. Naturally, at first, we were inclined to cut up rough, but I advised the boys to take it quietly. I offered, as I was in control, to accompany him provided the others were allowed to return to the ship, but apparently he wanted the lot. I thought it was merely a question of local corruption, and that they merely wanted a fine. Of course, the lads all took it as a joke, and would not have missed it for anything – the only fear was that, as the boat sailed at 2, and it was then 12.30, we should miss it. We accordingly all boarded a tram-car, with the sergeant and policeman in charge of us and the fellow who had complained.

— Michael McGahey, Express and Echo in "Have you ever played Brazil?: The story of Exeter City's 1914 tour of South America"

Once both sides had been heard, the 'Commissioner of Police' dismissed the complaint and the travelling party made it to the ship in time. The ship arrived in Montevideo early in the morning of 10 June. Mr Williams, the AFA secretary, and Mr MacKinnon, the AFA treasurer, met up with the travelling party there, having undertaking a nine-hour journey by steamer from Buenos Aires, with the purpose of welcoming City and assisting them in their landing.

=== Argentina ===
Once in Argentina, City played eight games. The first was a 3–0 defeat to "Combinado Norte" at Racing Club's stadium in Avellaneda on 14 June 1914. After being allowed to train at Belgrano Athletic Club, City beat Combinado Sur 3–0 on 21 June, again at Racing Club's stadium, with goals from William Hunter, Harry Holt and Billy Lovett. On 24 June, City beat Racing Club 2–0, Holt and Fred Marshall with the goals. This game was marred by a bizarre incident however, as when City took the lead Racing Club's secretary threatened the referee with a revolver, attempting to persuade him to send off Lagan (who had kicked Ochoa in the stomach, meaning he had to be carried off).

After this, there was also a problem with the scheduling, as City were due to play Liga Argentina on the 28th and a game in Rosario on the 29th. However, the Rosario League Committee had not been consulted and refused to accept the arrangements, resenting the fact that their game would be the day after one of the main fixtures of the tour and claiming that City would not be able to produce their best form. The games were rescheduled, with the Rosario game now being played on the 28th, a less important scratch XI on the 29th and the Liga Argentina game was postponed to 9 July.

City beat Liga Rosarina 3–1 (Fred Whittaker 2, Marshall) on 28 June at C.A. Argentino's stadium. The party then took the overnight train back to Buenos Aires. The fifth game of the tour saw City beat Combinados 5–0 (Whittaker 3, Lovett, Jimmy Lagan), again at Racing Club. On 9 July, City beat Liga Argentina 3–0 (Hunter 2, Goodwin) at Racing Club, before drawing 0–0 against a representative team of Argentinians (Argentinos) on 11 July at Ferro Carril Oeste's ground in Caballito. The final game in Argentina was again against Liga Argentina at Racing Club on 12 July, a 3–1 (Lovett 2, Goodwin) win. This game saw many changes to City's XI, with trainer Charlie Pratt having to play in goal due to an injury to Dick Pym and Reg Loram having influenza. Injuries to Holt and Marshall also meant reserve defender Gus Harding was selected to play.

Newspapers in Argentina were left disappointed with City's performances during the tour, Tribuna describing them as "the most mediocre team of professionals sent out by the FA from the home of football", and the Buenos Aires Herald complaining that the Grecians were not "sufficiently superior".

=== Brazil ===
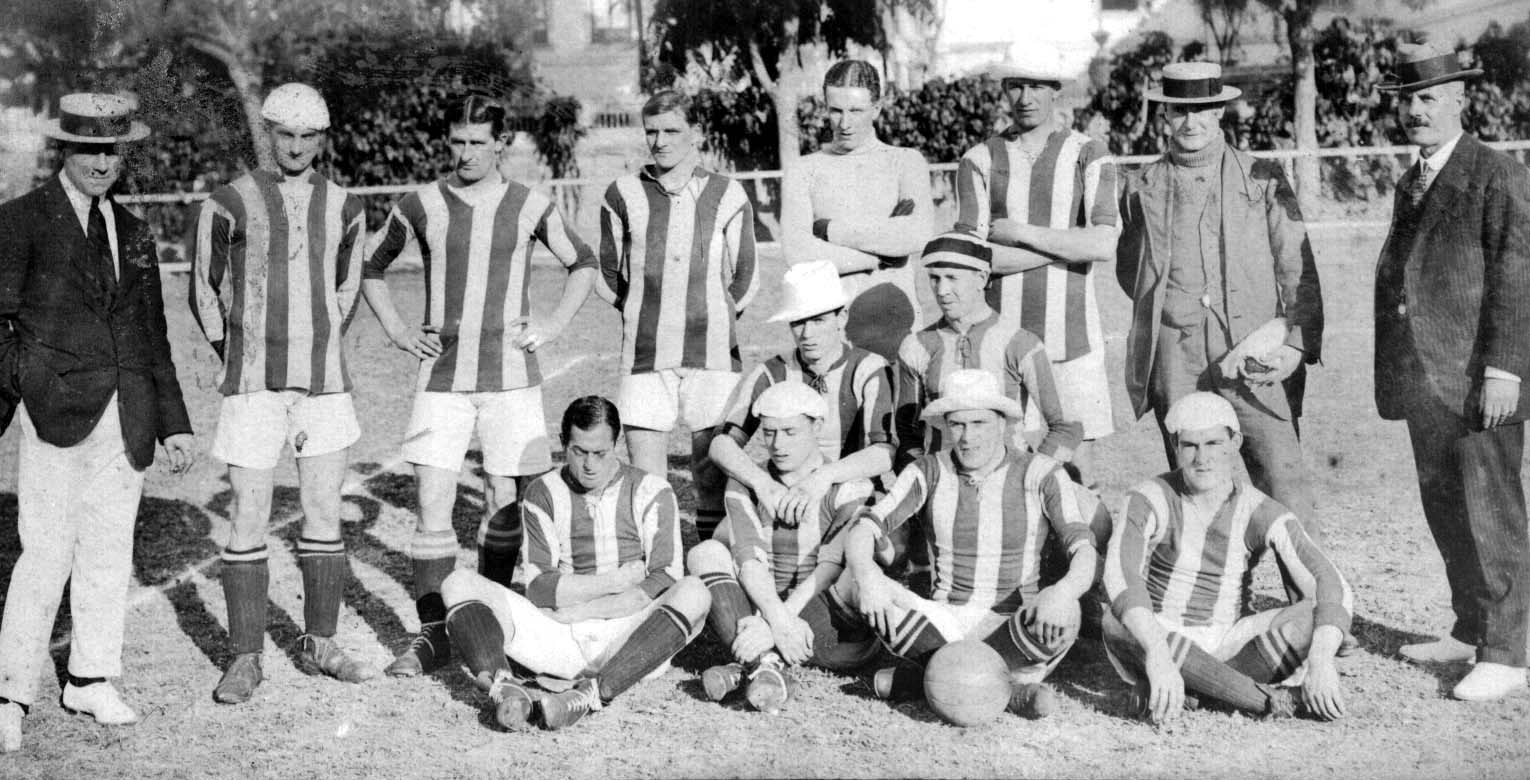
The team that played the Brazil national team in 1914

When the idea of playing three extra matches was discussed with McGahey on 8 June, what Harry Robinson and the Fluminense officials had in mind were games involving players based in Rio de Janeiro. In early July, the Brazilian press were reproducing reports from City's matches in Argentina. On 2 July, O Estado de S. Paulo announced that Fluminense and Paysandu had agreed, with McGahey, a contract for the games to go ahead, just above the report of the Racing game. City would be the first team of professionals to play in Brazil. Originally, it was hoped that City would also play a game in São Paulo, however, time constraints meant that it was not possible. The original programme was for City to play Rio English (known as Estrangeiros) on 18 July, Brasileiros on 19 July and the Cariocas (known as Rio de Janeiro) on 21 July. These last two were eventually switched. It was at this point that the Liga Metropolitana approached the APEA with the proposal that the Brasileiros and Estrangeiros games include Paulista players.

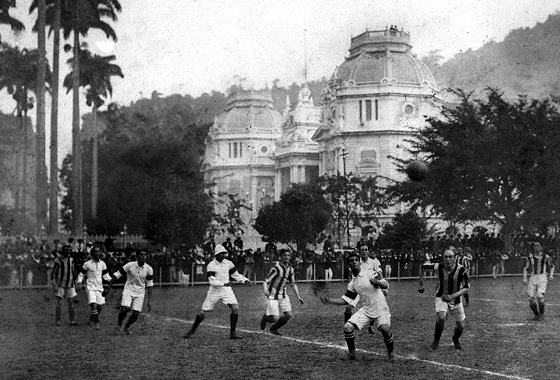
Exeter City playing Brazil national team in Rio de Janeiro

City's ship landed in Rio de Janeiro on 17 July. On 18 July, City beat Rio English 3–0 (Hunter, Holt, Lovett). The game was very one-sided, with City keeper Reg Loram (Pym missed the remainder of the tour through injury), the only amateur in the team, not being tested until late in the game. On 19 July, it was announced in the news that Paulista players would travel to Rio. Some had had difficulty getting time off work, so APEA's treasurer travelled to Rio to change the dates of the final two games in order for three Brasileiros from São Paulo -Rubens Salles (Paulistano), Xavier (Ipiranga) and Arthur Friedenreich (Ipiranga)- to play in a league match and catch the overnight train. Later that day, City beat Rio de Janeiro 5–3 (Charlie Pratt 2, Lagan, Goodwin, Hunter). Harry Welfare had put the hosts 3–1 ahead, at which point City became more physical, something which was criticised by the Correio da Manhã. On 21 July, City lost 2–0 to Brasileiros (a selection of Brazilian players from Rio and São Paulo). During the game, Lagan and Fort walked off the pitch, but were convinced to return to the field and finish the game. This is considered to be the Brazil national team's first ever game. All three games were played at Fluminense's Estádio das Laranjeiras. Harry Robinson played in the first two games and refereed the last one, making sixteen saves in the first game for Rio English.

On 27 September, seven members from the side that defeated City represented Brazil against Argentina in the Copa Roca match, which Brazil won 1–0. The Gazeta do São Paulo reported in 1928 that City had expressed, through diplomatic channels, a desire to return to Brazil. However, the enquiry came to nothing.

== Inter-war period (1918–1940) ==
After the end of World War I, City returned to the Southern League for the 1919–20 season. In 1920, The Football League invited the club to become founder members of the Third Division.

In the 1920s City struggled with the costs of being a Football League club and were forced to sell some of their best players, such as Harold Blackmore and Dick Pym. The latter's £5,000 transfer fee allowed City to purchase St James Park. Youngster Cliff Bastin was also sold to Arsenal, where he would later become their top goalscorer and play for England, after just 17 games for the Grecians. City played in the Third Division South for 18 seasons, until the 1939–40 season was interrupted by the outbreak of World War II. City achieved their highest ever league position in this period, finishing runners-up in 1933, but the fact that there was only one promotion place at the time meant the club remained in the division. Fred Whitlow scored 33 goals that season.

=== First tour of the Netherlands ===
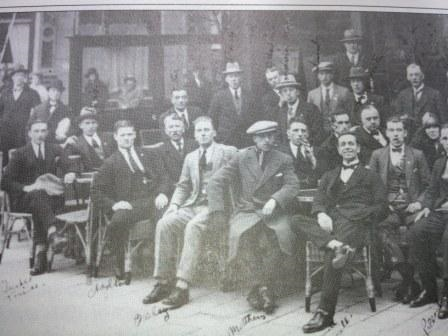
Exeter City relaxing in an Amsterdam café before their match with Ajax in 1925

On 15 March 1925, just one day after playing Norwich City in the league, City played a friendly match against Ajax in Amsterdam. The team travelled from Harwich to Rotterdam by ferry in the morning, before beating Ajax 5–1 in the evening in front of 15,000 spectators. Harry Kirk netted a hat-trick, with the other two goals being scored by Stanley Charlton (from a penalty) and Wilfred Lievesley.

=== 1931 FA Cup run ===
In 1931, City embarked on one of their most memorable FA Cup runs. City beat Northfleet United 3–0 away, Coventry City 2–1 away (via a replay, after drawing 1–1 at home), Derby County 3–2 at home, Bury 2–1 away and Leeds United 3–1 at home to reach the quarter finals. City drew 1–1 against Sunderland at Roker Park, eventually losing 4–2 at home in front of the club's largest ever home gate (20,984). The cup run inspired the name for the 1931 Fund, which was set up in 2009 with the purpose of financing an additional member of the first team squad, who wears the number 31 shirt.

== Back in Division Three South (1946–1958) ==
After World War II, City continued to play in the Third Division South. At first, City settled as a mid-table team, however, in the last seven years before the league reformation, City began to drift away from the middle of the table, finishing in the top 10 in 1953–54 (ninth), in the bottom four in 1951–52 (23rd), 1954–55 (22nd) and 1956–57 (21st), and bottom in 1957–58. Due to a re-organisation of the leagues in 1958, City found themselves in the newly formed Fourth Division ahead of the new season.

=== Second tour of the Netherlands ===
City returned to the Netherlands for a second time in May 1951, this time for ten days. City played four friendly matches: a 3–0 victory over VV DOS in Utrecht on 20 May, a 5–3 victory over Haarlem Eftal, a 4–2 defeat against B.V.V. Hertogenbosch and a 2–0 win over a Combined Hague XI.

== Division Four years (1958–63 and 1966–77) ==
City started off strongly in the newly formed Division Four, finishing fifth in 1958–59 and ninth in 1959–60 under the stewardship of Frank Broome. However, following Broome's departure for Southend United, City struggled, finishing in the bottom seven the following three seasons.

The 1963–64 season proved to be a memorable one for City. Jack Edwards, who had taken over the previous season, led the Grecians to their first ever promotion, finishing 4th in the league. He also managed City to survival in Division Three the following season, finishing 17th, before leaving at the club in January 1965. His successor, Ellis Stuttard, could not save City, with a 22nd-place finish in 1965–66 sealing a quick return to the basement division.

On their return to Division Four, City failed to finish in the top half in any of their first four seasons back. Johnny Newman, who had been made player-manager in that last season, vastly improved City's fortunes, with City only failing to make the top ten once in the following six seasons.

In the 1973–74 season, City refused to fulfil their away fixture against Scunthorpe United, which resulted in Scunthorpe being awarded the two points. City were experiencing severe financial difficulties which had restricted the club to a small squad of players. City then had an injury crisis which left them with only eight registered players that were fit. The Football League refused to postpone the game, despite City explaining that they would have to field unregistered players in order to fulfil the fixture. As a result, City did not turn up to the game and were fined £5,000 by the League plus a further £1,334 to compensate Scunthorpe and pay for the match officials' expenses. The League's reason for refusing City's request was their impatience with uneconomic clubs and their acceptance that some would go bankrupt. As of July 2015, this remains the only fixture never to be fulfilled in Football League history. Despite this, City managed to finish the season in 10th place.

Newman began the 1976–77 season with the Grecians, but left in December 1976 for Grimsby Town. His replacement, City defender turned player-manager Bobby Saxton, built upon Newman's work, leading City to second place and promotion to Division Three.

== Division Three stint (1977–84) ==
Saxton guided city to safety in 1977–78 with a 17th-place finish, but left in January 1979. His successor, Brian Godfrey, led City to ninth in 1978–79 and eighth in 1979–80, the club's highest ever position since geographical separation was abolished for the Third Division in 1958.

City's fortunes turned for the worse over the following seasons, finishing 11th in 1980–81, 18th in 1981–82 and 19th in 1982–83, after which Godfrey resigned. Gerry Francis took over as player-manager, but could only manage six victories as City finished bottom in 1983–84. This had been City's longest spell in Division Three since the abolition of geographical separation.

=== 1981 FA Cup run ===
In the 1980–81 season, City embarked on another memorable FA Cup run. City beat Leatherhead 5–0 at home, Millwall 1–0 away and Maidstone United 4–2 away. City then beat Leicester City and Newcastle United 3–1 and 4–0 at home respectively, following 1–1 away draws against both. City eventually lost 2–0 away to Tottenham Hotspur in the quarter-finals.

== The Ivor Doble era (mid 1980s–2003) ==
In the early 1980s, local jeweller Ivor Doble became involved with the club and, shortly after, became chairman of Exeter City.

On 9 May 1988, City appointed Terry Cooper as manager. Following a mid-table finish in his first season in charge, Cooper led City to their only major title in 1989–90, winning the Fourth Division title. City won an impressive 20 home league games in their title winning season and remained unbeaten in all 31 home fixtures (including cup games). In 2005, Doble announced that he had a replica of the trophy made when Barclays, the league sponsors, came to reclaim the trophy.

Following the club's promotion, Cooper led City to 16th in the Third Division, before leaving for Birmingham City at the end of the 1990–91 season. Alan Ball was subsequently appointed as manager on 6 August 1991.

Ball's tenure saw City narrowly avoid relegation by finishing 20th in 1991–92 and 19th in 1992–93. In December 1992, part of the floodlights failed with just six minutes left in City's home FA Cup game against Swansea City. The Grecians were losing 2–1 at the time, and when the referee tried to restart the match with only half of the floodlights working, City fans invaded the pitch and sat in the goalmouth. Once they were removed, the match restarted once more, only for the floodlights to fail one minute later; after which the match was abandoned. City lost the rescheduled match 5–2. City again made the headlines at the end the 1992–93 season, this time for all the wrong reasons. In the penultimate game of the season, City needed a win against Port Vale to avoid relegation. City were leading 1–0, but referee Bob Hamer awarded Port Vale a controversial penalty in stoppage time. The penalty was converted and, after the final whistle, City supporters invaded the pitch, the referee was knocked to the ground and one of the linesmen was assaulted. Manager Alan Ball also ran onto the pitch to remonstrate with Hamer and had to be pulled away by his backroom staff. The season did have a positive for City, as they completed a league double over rivals Plymouth Argyle.

In September 1993, comedian Freddie Starr was reportedly interested in buying City; he met with the Supporters' Club in a hotel near Exeter and even attended the club's 5–0 home win over Wrexham. However, the interest faded soon after. Ball left for Southampton in January 1994 and was replaced by the man he had originally succeeded at City, Terry Cooper. Despite his return, City finished 22nd in the 1993–94 season and were relegated back to the third division.

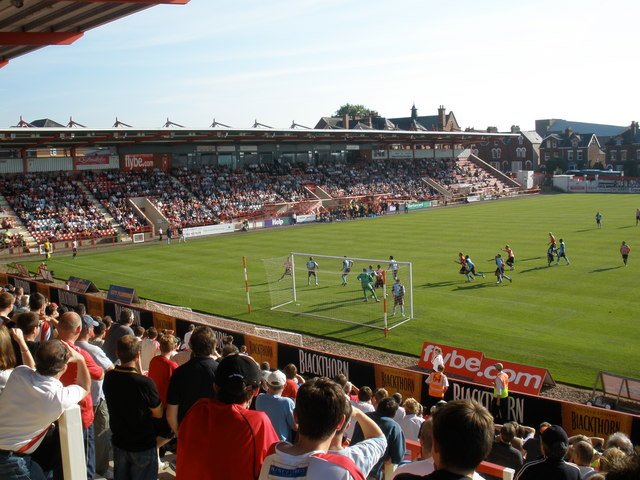
The new Ivor Doble stand, which opened in 2001.

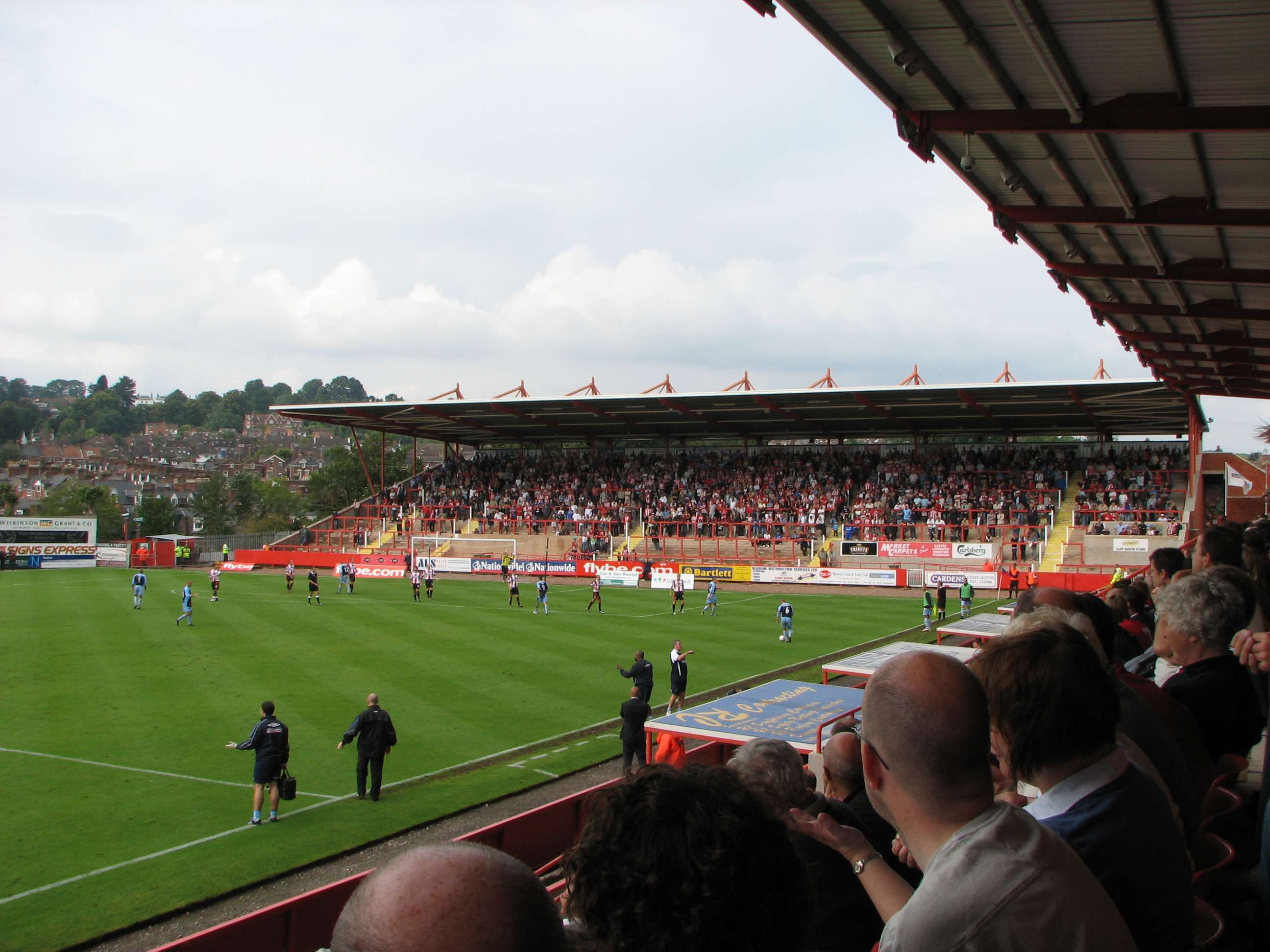
The new Big Bank stand, which opened in 2000.

In August 1994, the club were placed under a transfer embargo, at one point even being refused permission to sign a player on a free transfer and willing to playing for free. This led to the club only having 18 registered players, five of which were aged 18 or under. The continued financial troubles saw the club sell St James Park to Beazer for £650,000 in November 1994. In March 1995, the club were reported to be £1.2 million in debt. City came close to dropping out of the Football League in 1995 when they finished bottom of Division Three, but stayed up because Conference National champions Macclesfield Town's ground did not meet league requirements.

The ground was bought back by Exeter City Council at the end of the 1995–96 season, who leased it back to the club as a way of maintaining League football in the city. City eventually came out of administration in August 1996.

On 26 April 1997, illusionist Uri Geller attempted to use psychic energy (by placing crystals by the goalposts) to help the club beat Chester City. City lost the game 5–1.

City's finances began to improve and, as a result, the Club embarked on a redevelopment of St James Park. In February 2000, the open terraced Big Bank was replaced by a new covered terraced stand, named the Cliff Bastin Stand after the former Arsenal and England forward who had started his career at Exeter more than 70 years earlier. In 2001, the Cowshed (a terraced stand along the side of the pitch) was replaced by the Ivor Doble stand, an all seater, single tiered stand with executive boxes. The St James School building was refurbished into new offices, a social club and hospitality, conferencing and banqueting facilities. The costs of the redevelopment left City with new financial difficulties.

In 2002, as it became clear that Doble was looking to sell the club, Michael Russell and John Lewis were appointed as chairman and vicechairman respectively, with Russell falsely claiming that he had assets to cover the club's debts. They had beaten off a rival consortium led by Joe Gadston and Steve Perryman. Geller and his son were subsequently named as co-chairman and co-vice chairman respectively. On 14 June 2002, singer Patti Boulaye, magician David Blaine and Michael Jackson attended an event at St James Park in which the latter spoke about AIDS and Malaria. Jackson was also invited onto the board as an honorary member by Geller. Later on, David Prowse was also appointed to the club board.

The off-field events were followed up by a poor 2002–03 season. John Cornforth, Eamonn Dolan (as caretaker), Neil McNab and Gary Peters all managed the club during the season, as City were relegated to the Conference. At one point, it seemed that City would appoint Paul Gascoigne as manager, but Russell and Lewis changed their minds halfway to Newcastle after meeting with Gascoigne's middleman, Jimmy Five Bellies. City finished 23rd in the league and became the first ever team to be relegated to the Conference without finishing bottom of Division Three.

By the end of Ivor Doble's 20-year tenure as owner, he had invested £1 million in the club.

== Relegation to the Conference: the Supporters' Trust take over ==

Manchester United's starting line-up for the televised 3rd round FA Cup replay against Exeter City on 19 January 2005.

City's relegation to the Conference National in 2003 kick-started a major change in the club's structure. On 14 May 2003, John Russell and Mike Lewis were arrested over allegations of financial irregularities at the club. It later emerged that Uri Geller was one of the people who had contacted the police. Following Russell and Lewis' arrest, then Trust chairman Ian Huxham, chief executive Terry Pavey and Julian Tagg, all of which were prominent members of the Exeter City Supporters' Trust at the time, were appointed as directors of the club. Shortly after, Doble asked the Trust to take over the day-to-day running of the club. Complex legal arguments with both Inland Revenue and football authorities meant that City's first season of non-league football was plagued by off-the-field uncertainty. The claim was finally dropped in June 2004.

On 9 June 2003, former caretaker manager Eamonn Dolan was appointed as manager, with Steve Perryman being appointed as Director of Football.

On 5 September 2003, the Supporters' Trust purchased the club from Doble for £20,000, which, according to then Trust chairman Dr David Treharne, was "pretty much everything the Trust had at the time".

In the 2003–04 season, City finished sixth, just one point off the play-offs. Dolan left to manage the youth-set up at Reading in October 2004. Former City striker Alex Inglethorpe was appointed as Dolan's successor, beating off competition from title-winning captain Shaun Taylor.

In the 2004–05 season, City embarked on a brief FA Cup run, beating Braintree Town 2–1, Grimsby Town 1–0 and Doncaster Rovers 2–1, all of them at home. On 8 January 2005, Exeter City drew 0–0 against Manchester United at Old Trafford in the 3rd round. City lost 2–0 in the televised replay at St James Park 11 days later, Cristiano Ronaldo and Wayne Rooney scoring the goals. The income from these two games, just under £1 million, led to the club's debts being virtually cleared. However, City again failed to reach the play-offs, finishing 6th in the league.

In early 2006, director Paul Morrish presented a plan, called V10, to the Club and the Supporters' Trust. The main objective of the plan was simple: to reach League One by 2010. The adoption of the plan brought with it a boardroom shake-up which saw chairman Dr David Treharne replaced by Denise Watts (who was also chairwoman of the Supporters' Trust). In March 2006, Inglethorpe signed a 12-month rolling contract, with the club still in the play-off race.

City did not make the play-offs, finishing seventh, the club's lowest ever league position. However, City did make the FA Trophy semi-final, where they lost to eventual winners Grays Athletic. Inglethorpe's last action as City manager was to sign Adam Stansfield from newly promoted Hereford United, before leaving for Tottenham Hotspur as youth coach.

== The Tisdale era (2006–2018) ==
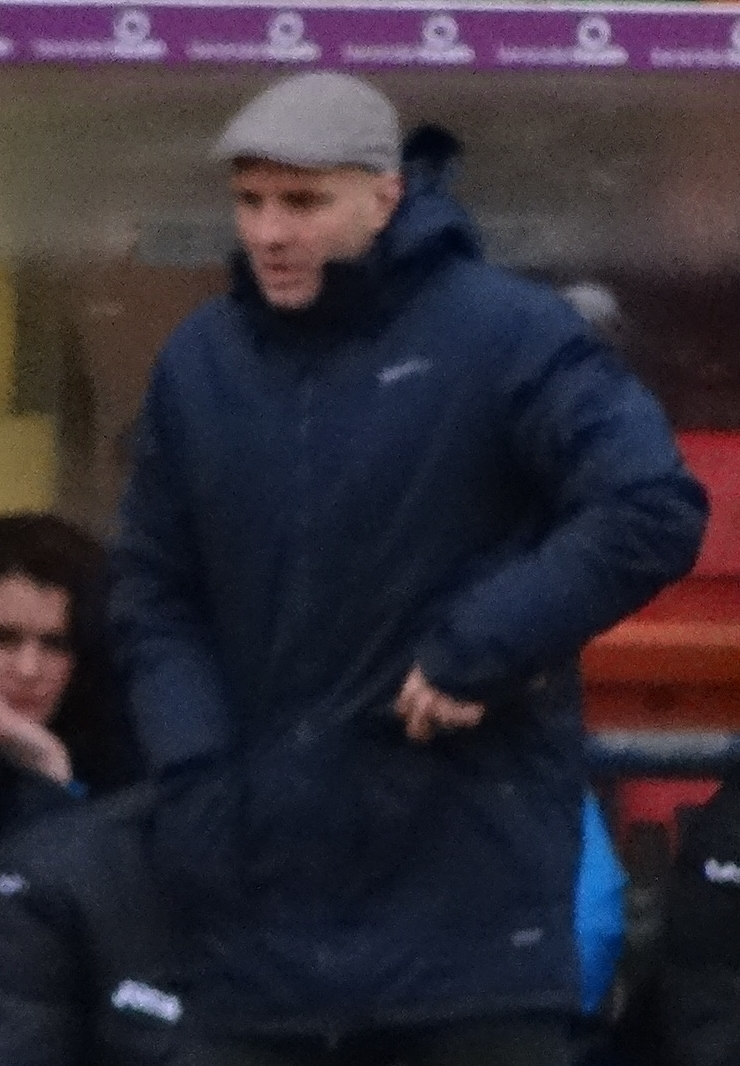
Paul Tisdale managing Exeter City against York City at Bootham Crescent on 28 February 2015

On 26 June 2006, former loanee Paul Tisdale was named as the new manager of Exeter City on a 12-month rolling contract. On 3 July, Tisdale handed former City defender Jon Richardson, Jefferson Louis and Patrick Ada one week trials. Richardson eventually signed on an initial six-month contract on 24 July, and was joined by fellow trialist Ada. Tisdale also brought in the experienced Rob Edwards in August and former winger Wayne Carlisle returned in November following his release in the summer. Tisdale would later take advantage of Weymouth's financial difficulties to bring in Steve Tully, Richard Logan and Lee Elam, who would go on to score a hat-trick against Weymouth on his debut.

In Tisdale's first season in charge, he took City to Wembley Stadium for the first time in the club's history. During the season, City won 36 points in the first half of the season and 42 points in the second half. The 2006–07 season was not without controversy however, with January signing Lee Elam being headbutted by then Kidderminster Harriers manager Mark Yates. City won the game 2–0.

The starting line-up for the Conference Premier play-off final win against Cambridge United on 18 May 2008, resulting in promotion to The Football League.

In the 2007–08 season, City won 40 points in the opening 23 league fixtures, following it up with 43 points in the second 23 games. City returned to Wembley for a second successive season following a 5–3 aggregate victory over local rivals Torquay United in the play-off semi-final. This season, however, City were triumphant against Cambridge United -winning 1–0 thanks to a goal from Rob Edwards- to end a five-year spell in non-league football.

In just Tisdale's third season at the helm, the 2008–09 season, he became the most successful manager in Exeter City's history after guiding the club to back-to-back promotions. City won promotion on the final game of the season, with Richard Logan scoring the only goal of the game in a 1–0 win over Rotherham United at the Don Valley Stadium.

In December 2009, it was announced that Edward Chorlton was to become chairman of the Club in the new year. In January 2010, and following the V10 plan's success, chief executive Norrie Stewart announced the "V10 mark two": a plan to establish the club in League One, push for promotion into the Championship and to do all it can to experience and sustain Championship football. City retained their League One status on the final day of the 2009–10 season, with Ryan Harley scoring an 82nd-minute winner in a 2–1 win over Huddersfield Town.

City equalled Brian Godfrey's highest league position by finishing 8th in 2010–11, but were relegated back to League Two in 2011–12. In a 2020 interview with The Coaches' Voice -in which he also mistakenly claimed that the Grecians "had never finished in the top third of League One"- Tisdale explained how the club had decided to disregard its business model during the 2010–11 season due to "a chance for a once-in-a-generation achievement", recalling:

"We missed out on the playoffs by one point, and the next year we plummeted. [...] To this day, I still maintain it was the right decision".

— Paul Tisdale, Interview with The Coaches' Voice

The return trip to Brazil in 2014 could not have come at a worse time from the club's perspective, having been placed under a transfer embargo for taking out a loan of £100,000 from the PFA on 3 June. On 15 August, City paid off the PFA loan and lifted the transfer embargo that came with it. Later that day, City announced Graham Cummins as their first signing of the summer. On 21 August, Christian Ribeiro became City's second and final summer signing. City were later able to permanently sign loanees Ryan Harley, David Noble and Alex Nicholls; whilst also adding Clinton Morrison and Tom McCready to the squad.

Despite being amongst the pre-season favourites to be relegated, the 2014–15 season turned out to be a positive on for City: selling academy product Matt Grimes to Swansea City for a club record fee of £1.75 million and finishing 10th in the league, only missing out on the play-offs mathematically on the penultimate game of the year.

The 2015–16 season saw the Grecians once again miss out on the play-offs, finishing the season without a win from their final five games and in 14th place. The season still had positives for City, completing the double over bitter rivals Plymouth Argyle thanks to braces from Ryan Harley and Ollie Watkins, away and at home respectively; drawing 2–2 with Liverpool in the FA Cup third round before losing 3–0 in the replay at Anfield, and falling to a memorable 6–3 defeat against Sunderland at the Stadium of Light in the Capital One Cup.

The 2016–17 season proved to be a dramatic one for the Grecians. City started the season poorly, breaking the record for consecutive home defeats in the league (5) in a 2–0 loss against Notts County in September; a run which included a Devon Derby defeat against Plymouth Argyle in which new signing Reuben Reid -who had signed from Plymouth just days earlier- made his debut for the club. With the club in the relegation zone and suffering an unprecedented injury crisis, the Supporters' Trust ordered the club to serve notice on Tisdale's two-year rolling contract. City recorded their first home win of the season on 17 December, beating Mansfield 2–0 thanks to a brace from Ollie Watkins.

Following a tumultuous start to the season the Grecians had a dramatic upturn in form, breaking the club's record of consecutive league victories (seven) between 31 December 2016 and 4 February 2017, a run in which David Wheeler also broke the record for a City player scoring in consecutive league games (scoring eight in seven consecutive fixtures). The club also went on to break their record for away wins in a single season, recording their 13th victory away from home on 29 April with a 3–1 defeat of Doncaster Rovers which also secured a play-off finish. In a dramatic play-off semi-final tie against Carlisle United, in which City surrendered the lead three times, twice from being two goals up; the Grecians went through to the final thanks to a long-range goal from Jack Stacey in the 95th minute, winning 6–5 on aggregate. This was also the final game played in front of the Old Grandstand before it was closed ahead of its demolition. City lost 2–1 against Blackpool in the play-off final.

In the 2017-18 season, they again were on the losing side of the play-off final, this time against Coventry.

Tidale left the club on 1 June 2018 after 12 years in charge.

=== Tour of Norway ===
Ahead of the 2011–12 season, City went on a five-day pre-season tour of Norway. Based in Bergen, City played three matches in the space of three days. On 15 July, City beat Fana 3–2, Richard Logan netting a brace and Scot Bennett scoring a late winner. City came from behind to beat Os TF 4–1 on 16 July, with goals from Elliott Frear, Tom Nichols, Callum McNish and Daniel Nardiello. On 17 July, City rounded off their tour with a 1–1 draw against Follese Fotballklubb, Nardiello having a goal disallowed before Jake Gosling equalised for the Grecians.

=== Return to Brazil ===
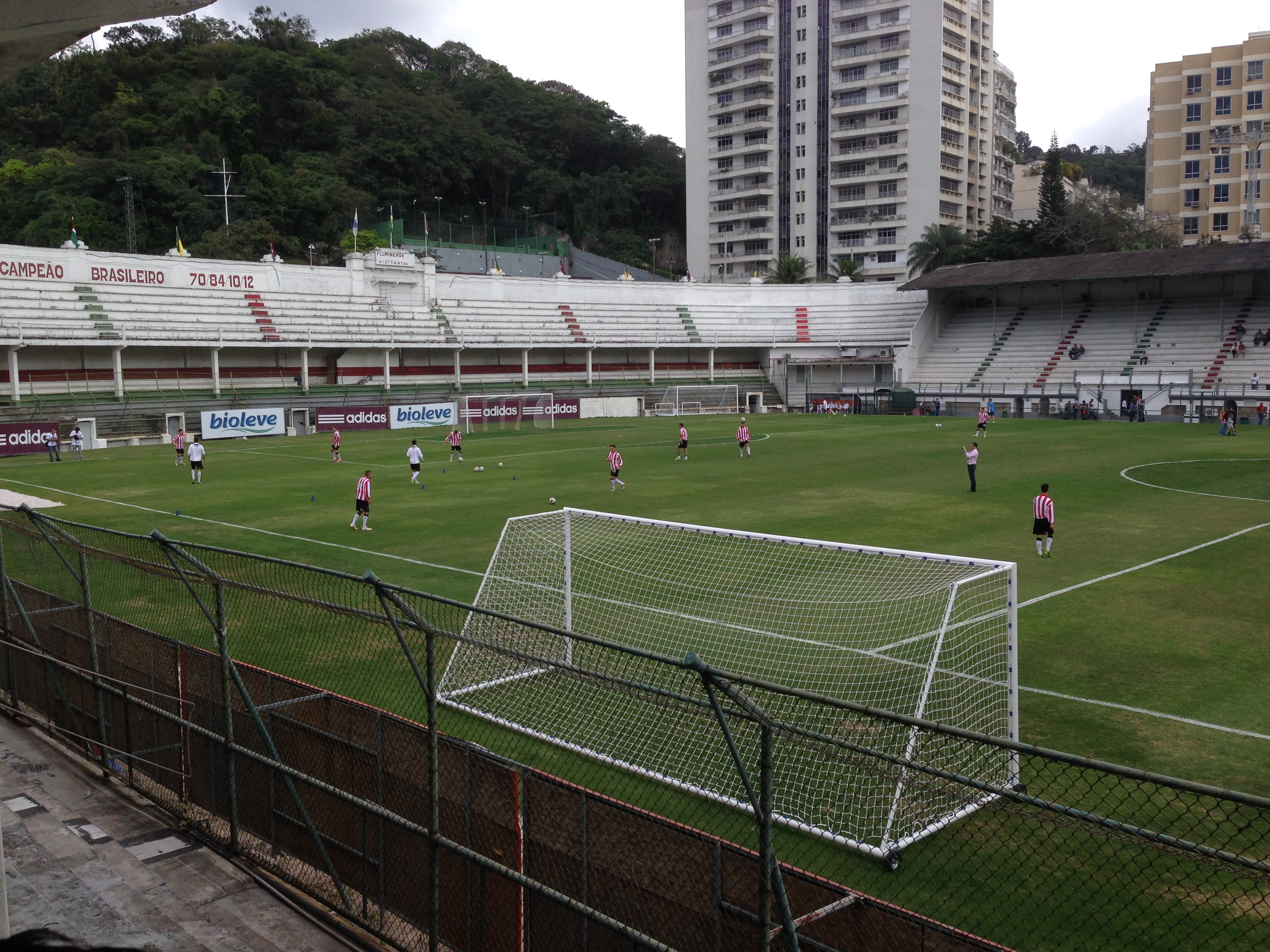
Exeter City warming up at Estádio das Laranjeiras ahead of their pre-season friendly against Fluminense U23s in 2014.

On 26 July 2013, it was announced that City would play a friendly match against Fluminense in July 2014 to commemorate the centennial of the Brazil national team's first ever game. Talking about the trip, then club captain Scot Bennett said:

"I know bits and bobs, I've read a lot in the newspapers recently, learning what the game was all about, with Exeter playing Brazil a hundred years ago and being the first team to do that. I know that there is a lot of history there and I think that both the club and the players are going to be a massive part of Brazil's history for a long time."

"It is one thing to lead your team out on a matchday, when you are over there and are part of something so big, coming out in a big stadium and against such a big team, there's always going to be an added emphasis on that. It's definitely added to the excitement for me and around 160 fans are travelling over and making a big effort to come over. Hopefully we can put on a good show for them."

"As a young boy you dream you can play in big stadiums, full stadiums, against good sides, but when you're playing in League Two it does not happen week in, week out, going over to Brazil, where the World Cup has just taken place, is definitely going to be a dream come true for me and all of the lads."

— Scot Bennett, BBC Sport

Whilst in Brazil, City played three pre-season friendlies: a 0–0 draw against Fluminense under-23s, a 2–1 win over Tupi and a 3–1 win over Rio Cricket e Associação Atlética. Following the friendly against Fluminense under-23s, the City team and supporters were invited to watch Fluminense's first team in league action against Santos. That game finished 1–0 to Fluminense.

However, the trip to Brazil took its toll on City's squad. A sickness bug within the camp meant Tisdale had to name himself on the bench for the club's opening game of the season against Portsmouth.

== The Post-Tisdale era (since 2018) ==
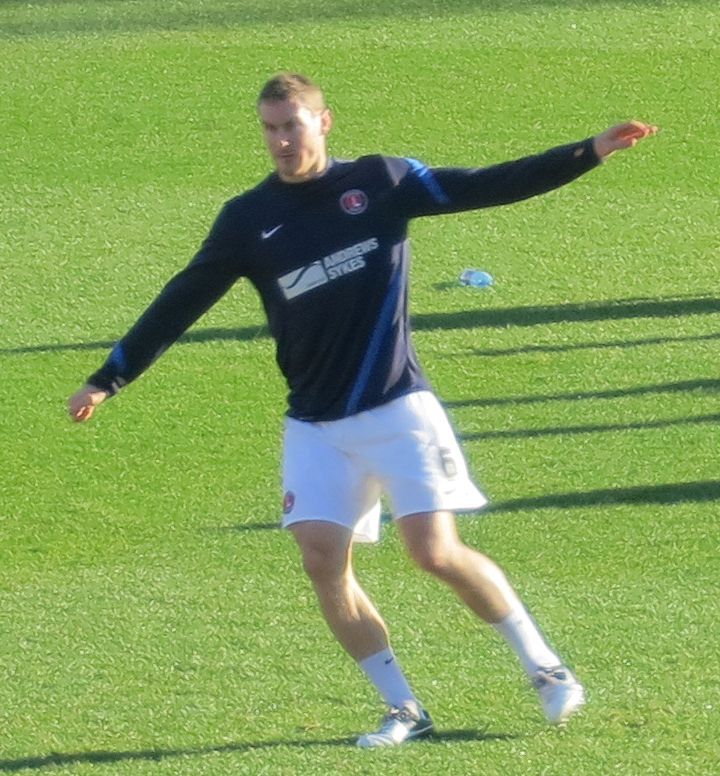
Former captain Matt Taylor replaced the departing Paul Tisdale.

Former captain Matt Taylor was appointed the new manager of the club on 1 June 2018, following the announcement of long-serving manager Paul Tisdale's departure earlier the same day.

With Matt Oakley, Mell Gwinnett and Steve Perryman following Tisdale to MK Dons, Taylor was forced to rebuild his backroom staff by recruiting his former coach Eric Kinder as assistant manager, Chris Weale as goalkeeping coach, Andrew Wiseman as strength and conditioning coach, and promoting youth coach Dan Green as Under-23s coach in late June. Taylor's first signings as manager followed shortly after, with Aaron Martin and Jonathan Forte signing in the space of a few days. Further signings followed in July in the form of Nicky Law, Lee Martin and Jimmy Oates.

City won their first league match under Matt Taylor on the opening day of the 2018–19 season, beating Carlisle United 3–1. City had a strong start to the season but, as a result of inconsistent form and with the loss of top scorer Jayden Stockley in the January transfer window, the Grecians missed out on a third successive season in the play-offs following a 0–0 away draw against Forest Green Rovers on the final day of the season.

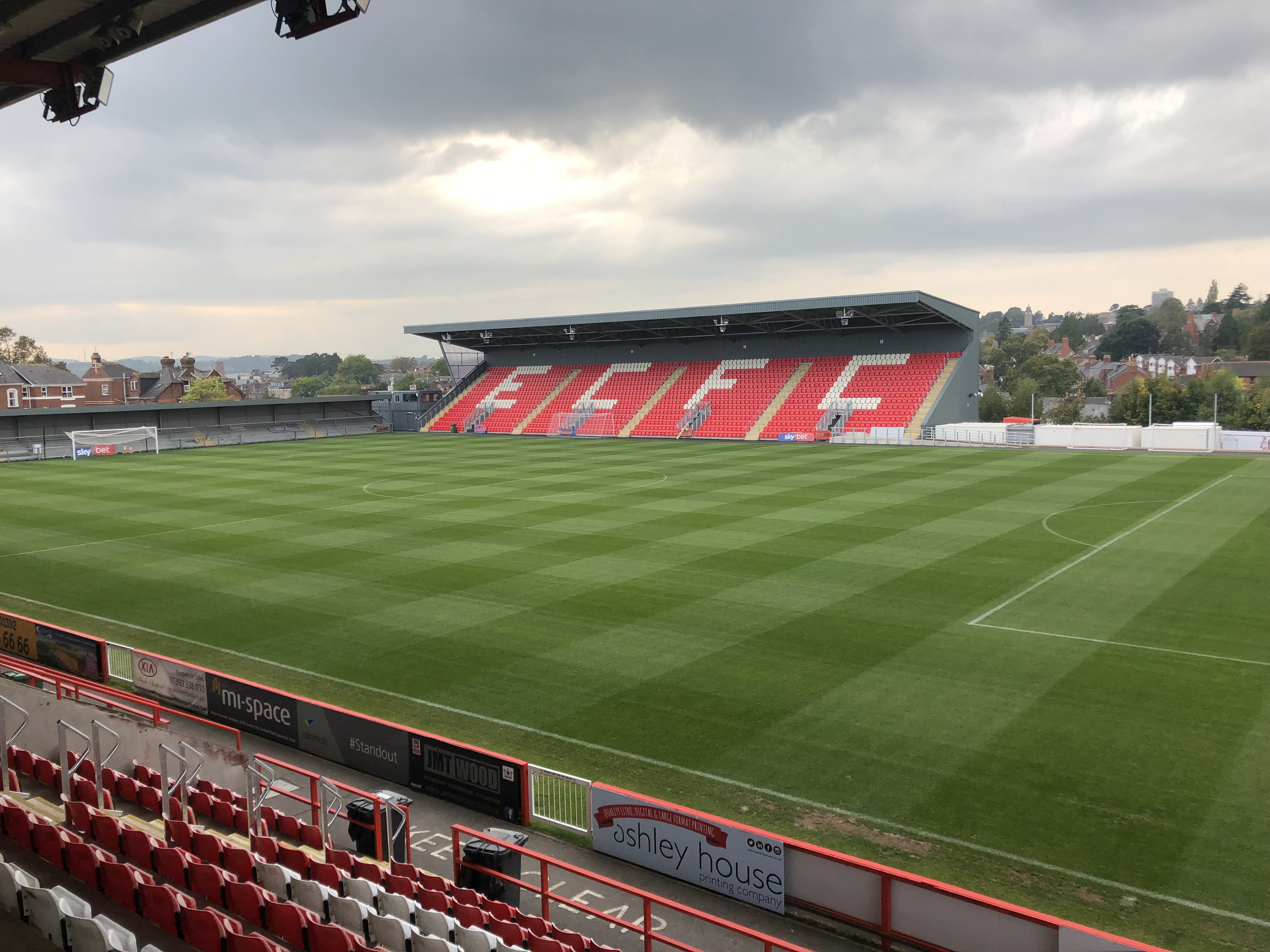
The Adam Stansfield Stand shortly after construction was finalised.

Despite falling short of the play-offs, the season was still a significant one for City, as the £3.5 million redevelopment of the stadium was completed in October 2018 and the new Adam Stansfield stand was opened for the game against Forest Green Rovers on 27 October.

Taylor was forced to once again rebuild his backroom staff ahead of the 2019–20 season, with Steve Hale replacing Chris Weale as goalkeeping coach, Connor Durbridge replacing Andrew Wiseman as strength and conditioning coach, and Gareth Law and Dan Feasey joining as physios. Taylor also brought about a reshuffle of the playing squad ahead of the season, with eight players signing for the club -most notably Nicky Ajose, Nigel Atangana and Tom Parkes- and nine leaving -most notably Hiram Boateng joining Tisdale at MK Dons, Christy Pym leaving for Peterborough United and Jay Stansfield, son of Adam, signing for Fulham- whilst Jonathan Forte was forced to retire due to a knee injury he picked up the previous season.

The club were in fourth place in the league when the EFL suspended matches due to the COVID-19 pandemic, having controversially lost their final game before the suspension 3–1 against Walsall.
