= John Fort =

John Fort may refer to:

- John Franklin Fort (1852–1920), American Republican Party politician, Governor of New Jersey 1908–1911
- John Fort (MP), (fl.1830s), English Member of Parliament for Clitheroe 1832–1841
- Jack Fort, John Fort, English footballer

== See also ==
- Jon Fortt (born 1976), American journalist
- John Forte (comics), comic book artist
- John Forté, rapper
- Fort John, California
