= Brazil v Exeter City F.C. (1914) =

Brazil vs. Exeter City
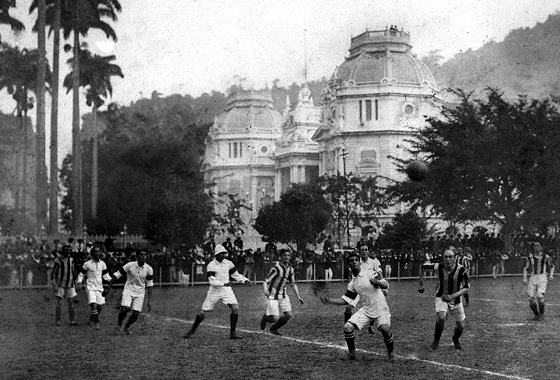
- The first Brazil national football team's match ever, played vs. English team Exeter City in 1914, with the Guanabara Palace in the background
- Event: Friendly match
| Brazil | Exeter City F.C. |
| (Brazil) | (England) |
| 2 | 0 |
- Date: 21 July 1914
- Venue: Estádio das Laranjeiras, Rio de Janeiro
- Referee: Harry Robinson (ENG)
- Attendance: 5,000

Brazil vs. Exeter City F.C. was the first match involving the Brazil national football team. The match was part of the Exeter City tour of South America where the team played against Argentine and Brazilian teams, just like other British clubs toured before and after during the first years of football in the region.

== History ==
The match was played on July 21, 1914, on the field of Fluminense FC, located at Rua das Laranjeiras, in a high class area on the south side of Rio de Janeiro. Brazil played Exeter City, then a third-tier club in England, who were touring South America.

The newly formed Brazilian Sports Federation (Portuguese: Federação Brazileira de Sports), FBS, brought together the best players in Rio de Janeiro and São Paulo. Among those called up were great early names of Brazilian football: Marcos de Mendonça, Friedenreich, Abelardo De Lamare, Rubens Salles and Sílvio Lagreca.

Exeter had previously won two friendlies in Rio de Janeiro - first, they won 3–0 against English players who competed in the sport's championships in Rio de Janeiro, and then overcame Rio de Janeiro 5–3 - and were favourites to win. However, in a display of skill and technique that surprised the Exeter City players, Brazil beat their opponents 2–0, with goals from Oswaldo Gomes – the first in the team's history – and Osman, both in the first half of the match. Astonished and powerless to react, the English resorted to violence. Despite the appetite of their foreign rivals, light and leisurely football by Brazilians prevailed.

More than a hundred years later, Exeter City is proud to have participated in the birth of the Brazil national team. At its home stadium, St James Park in Exeter, the Britons have hoisted the flags of Brazil. From the stands, one of The Grecians (The Greeks) fans' songs alludes to the historic clash with Brazil:

Have you ever, have you ever

Have you ever played Brazil?

Have you ever played Brazil?

— Exeter City F.C. supporters chorus

== Match details ==
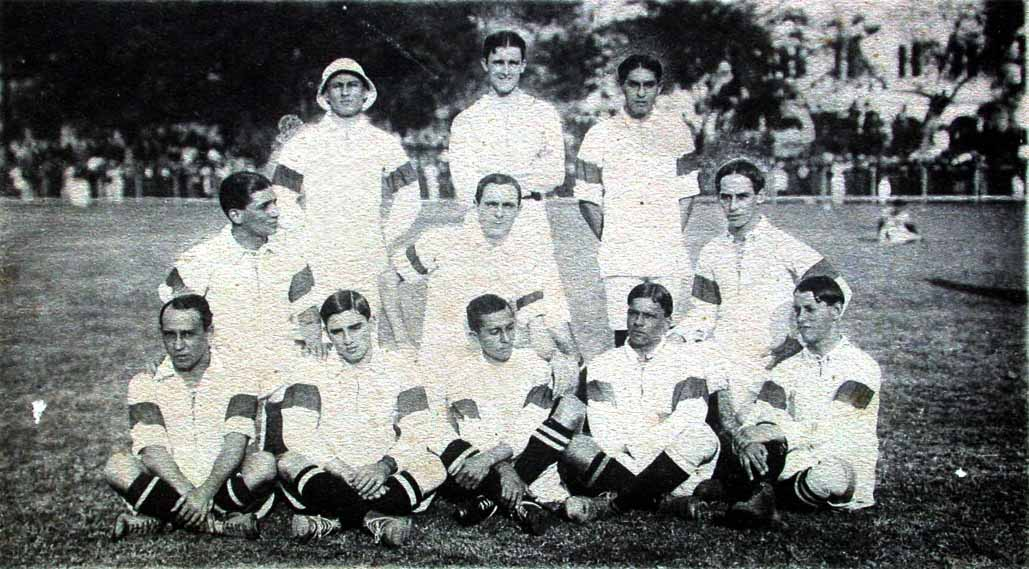
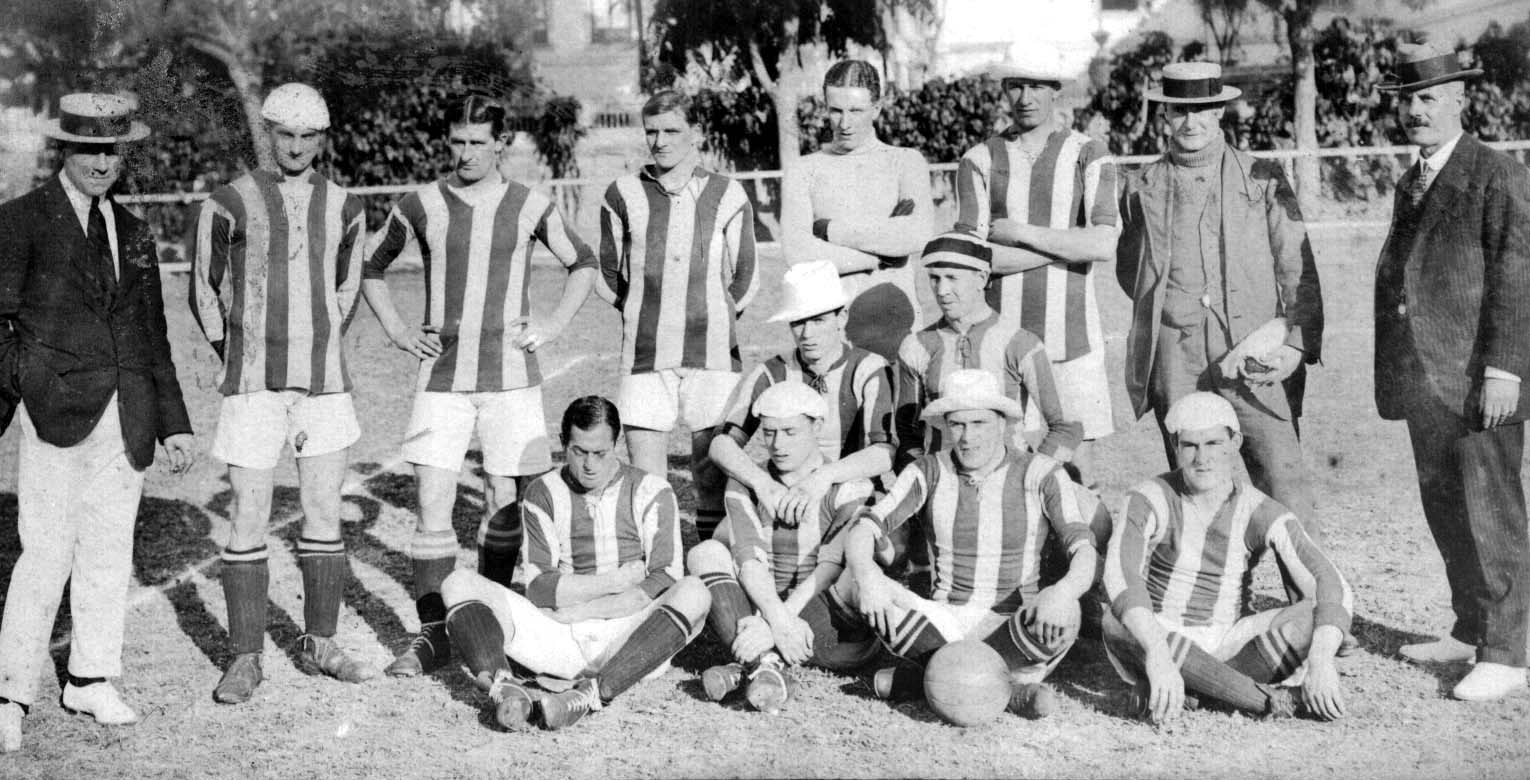
Brazil (left) and Exeter City squads before playing the historic match
July 21, 1914

| Brazil | 2–0 | (England) Exeter City |
|---|---|---|
| Oswaldo Gomes 28'; Osman 36' | Report |

Estádio das Laranjeiras, Rio de Janeiro
Attendance: 5,000
Referee: Harry Robinson (ENG)

Brazil
Exeter City

| GK | Marcos de Mendonça |
| DF | Píndaro |
| DF | Nery |
| MF | Sílvio Lagreca |
| MF | Rubens Salles |
| MF | Rolando de Lamare |
| FW | Abelardo de Lamare |
| FW | Oswaldo Gomes |
| FW | Arthur Friedenreich |
| FW | Osman Medeiros |
| FW | Formiga |
Manager:
Sílvio Lagreca and Rubens Salles

| GK | (England) Reginald Loram |
| DF | (England) Jack Fort |
| DF | (England) Samuel Strettle |
| MF | (England) James Rigby |
| MF | (England) James Lagan |
| MF | (England) Gus Harding |
| FW | (England) Harold Holt |
| FW | (England) Fred Whittaker |
| FW | (England) William Hunter |
| FW | (England) William Lovett |
| FW | (England) Fred Goodwin |
Manager:
(England) Arthur Chadwick

== See also ==
- History of the Brazil national football team
- History of Exeter City F.C.
- Brazil national football team results (unofficial matches)
- British football clubs tours to South America
