= Osman Medeiros =

Brazilian footballer

Osman
Personal information
- Full name: Osman Medeiros
- Date of birth: 1896
- Place of birth: Rio de Janeiro, Brazil
- Date of death: 1929 (aged 32–33)
- Place of death: Curitiba, Brazil
- Position: Midfielder

Senior career*
Years	Team	Apps	(Gls)
1912–1913	SC Americano-RJ		
1914–1919	America-RJ		
- * Club domestic league appearances and goals as of 4 February 2024

Osman Medeiros (1896 – 1929), was a Brazilian professional footballer who played as a midfielder.

== Career ==
A midfielder, Osman began his career at SC Americano in 1912. With the club's dissolution the following year, he went to America, a team he played for until 1919, when he left the football to embark on a military career.

== International career ==
Osman played in just one match for the Brazil national team, the first in history, against Exeter City, 21 July 1914.

== Honours ==
America

- Campeonato Carioca: 1916

== Death ==
Osman was killed with a shot in the chest when breaking up a fight in the city of Curitiba, between police officers and people protesting against the milk coffee politics.
