= Oswaldo Gomes =

Brazilian footballer

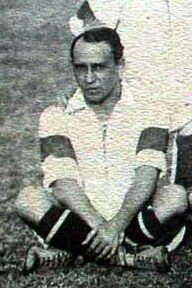
- Gomes during Brazil v Exeter City in 1914

Personal information
- Full name: Oswaldo Gomes
- Date of birth: 30 April 1886
- Place of birth: Rio de Janeiro, Brazil
- Date of death: 5 July 1963 (aged 77)
- Place of death: Rio de Janeiro, Brazil
- Position: Forward

Senior career*
Years	Team	Apps	(Gls)
1906–1921	Fluminense	187	(42)

International career
1914–1917	Brazil	2	(0)
- * Club domestic league appearances and goals as of 2 February 2024

Oswaldo Gomes (30 April 1886 – 5 July 1963), was a Brazilian footballer and sports executive. He played as a forward for Fluminense and Brazil national team. He is most remembered as the scorer of the first goal in the history of the Brazil national team, against Exeter City F.C., on 21 July 1914. Gomes also is the player with most Campeonato Carioca titles in the history, with eight trophies won. He served as president of Brazilian Sports Confederation beetwen 1922 to 1924, having secured its affiliation with FIFA during his tenure.

== Career ==
Oswaldo Gomes was part of the squad that won the first ever Campeonato Carioca, in 1906, when Fluminense FC started a sequence of four titles in a row. There he and remained until 1922, making 197 appearances and scoring 42 goals for Fluminense FC. He is the all-time record holder in Campeonato Carioca titles, with 8 in total. In 1911, he showed loyalty to his beloved club and was one of the athletes who refused to form the football department of CR Flamengo, who was creating then their football department. Until 1922, he his career exclusively to Fluminense FC. Gomes was also president of the Brazilian Sports Confederation (current CBF), from 1922, the year he retired as an athlete, until 1924.

== International career ==
Oswaldo Gomes was responsible for the first goal in Brazil's history, in the 28th minute of the game, against Exeter City. He also played two more matches against clubs (Columbian FC and Sportivo Barracas), in addition to the first two Full A matches, against Argentina, in the 1914 Copa Roca and in a friendly match. He also had the responsibility of being Brazil's coach in the 1920 South American Championship, alongside Agostinho Fortes, the team captain.

== Honours ==
Fluminense

- Campeonato Carioca: 1906, 1907, 1908, 1909, 1911, 1917, 1918, 1919

Brazil

- Copa Roca: 1914
