= Fort John, California =

Coordinates: 38.4817°N 120.6628°W

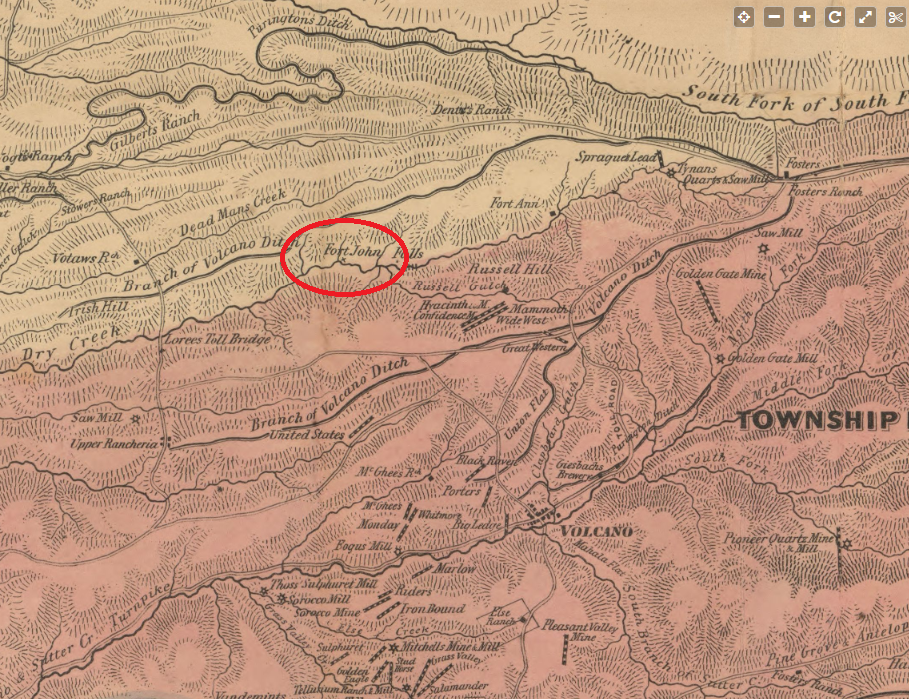
Fort John highlighted on excerpt of official 1866 map of Amador County.

Fort John is a former settlement and mining location in Amador County, California, United States, briefly populated in the 1850s. It was located on the South Fork of Dry Creek, 4 miles (6.4 km) northwest of Volcano. Fort John was named for John Stuart.

A church and schoolhouse, reportedly the first in what would become Amador County, were built as early as 1850-51. The church was Methodist Episcopal and built by P.Y. Cool. The site thrived for about a year, but when the mining in Volcano proved better, the site was largely abandoned, with only minor activity after that. Some miners and residents remained later in the decade. An 1857 story said that Fort John "retains more of the signs and characteristics of old Forty-Nine times than any other place in this section of California. You behold the log-cabin, with canvass roof; the clapboard palace with mud chimney emitting the savory perfumes of burnt slapjacks and beans straight, not forgetting the bountiful supply of oro that lines the pockets of the 'honest miners.' Everyone is proficient in the mysteries of poker and old sledge ..."

By 1881, a county history book reported only one resident there, who "seems to have staid to point out the site of the former town, and relate to occasional visitors the glories of the ancient days." Yet, the Mining Bureau still had the site listed as of 1954.
