= Jack Fort =

English footballer

Personal information
- Full name: John Fort
- Date of birth: 15 April 1888
- Place of birth: Leigh, Lancashire, England
- Date of death: 23 November 1965 (aged 77)
- Position: Right back

Youth career
- St Andrew's Mission

Senior career*
Years	Team	Apps	(Gls)
1907–1911	Atherton		
1911–1914	Exeter City		
1914–1930	Millwall Athletic	250	(0)

International career
1921	England	1	(0)
- * Club domestic league appearances and goals

John Fort (15 April 1888 – 23 November 1965) was an English professional footballer who played most of his career (as a right back) with Millwall. He also made one appearance for England.

== Career ==
Jack Fort was born in Leigh, Lancashire, where he played youth football with St Andrew's Mission in the Bolton and District League. He began his professional career with Atherton in the Lancashire Combination in 1907, before moving to the South Coast to join Southern League Exeter City in 1911. In his three seasons at Exeter, they finished each season in a mid-table position.

After three years in Devon, Fort switched to London to join another Southern League club, Millwall Athletic, thus beginning an association with the club that lasted for the rest of his life. After service in the Dragoon Guards during the First World War, Fort returned to Millwall, where he won his solitary full international cap against Belgium in a 2–0 victory on 21 May 1921, thus achieving the rare distinction of playing for England whilst on the books of a Third Division club. Fort also gained representative honours with the Southern League.

In 1920, Millwall (along with most of the Southern League clubs) had joined the Football League as founder members of the Third Division. After third-place finishes in 1924, 1926 and 1927, Millwall won the Third Division South title in 1928. Fort retired as a player in 1930 having made 332 appearances for Millwall.

He continued to be associated with Millwall for the rest of his life in a variety of roles, including coach, trainer, assistant groundsman and scout. and was still working for the club until a few weeks before his death on 23 November 1965, aged 77.

Jack Fort also gained three England caps playing in trial internationals against the home countries. He holds two records at Millwall which are unlikely to be broken. He is the oldest player ever to have played for Millwall in a league match at 42 years of age and he is still Millwall's longest serving employee having joined from Exeter City in 1914 and staying on in various capacities until he died in 1965 a total of 51 years.

In 2014 an original musical called The Day We Played Brazil opened at The Northcott Theatre in Exeter about the 1914 Exeter City team who were the first football team to play Brazil. Devon born actor James Cotter played Jack Fort in the musical which sold out its run and played the existing Exeter City team and some Exeter City legends and some of the families of the original players.

== Honours ==
Millwall

- Football League Third Division South champions: 1927–28
