= Estádio de Laranjeiras =

Football stadium in Brazil

- Laranjeiras Stadium
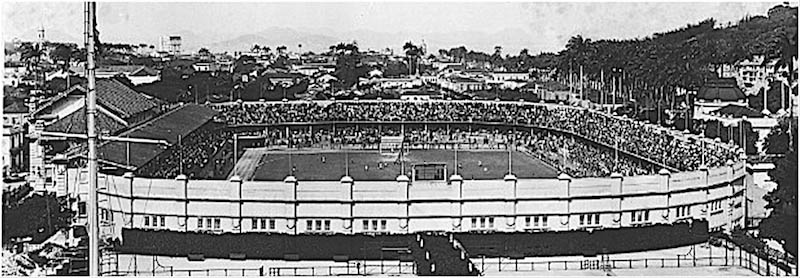
- The stadium in 1922
- Interactive map of Estádio de Laranjeiras
- Full name: Manoel Schwartz Stadium
- Location: Rio de Janeiro, Brazil
- Coordinates: 22°56′12.7″S 43°11′04.1″W
- Owner: Fluminense
- Operator: Fluminense
- Capacity: 6,000
- Surface: Grass
- Record attendance: 25,718 (June 14, 1925, Fluminense 3–1 Flamengo)
- Field size: 105 x 70m

Construction
- Built: 1914
- Opened: 1914; 112 years ago
- Renovated: 1919
- Expanded: 1922
- Architect: Hypolito Pujol

Tenant
- Fluminense

Estádio de Laranjeiras (English: Laranjeiras Stadium), officially named Estádio Manoel Schwartz is a historic football stadium in Rio de Janeiro state, Brazil. The stadium currently holds 6,000 spectators but, due to its reduced capacity and a lack of safety permits, has not hosted professional football matches since 2003. It was built in 1905 and is one of the oldest stadiums in Brazil. The stadium is owned by Fluminense Football Club.

== History ==
Fluminense acquired a plot at Guanabara Street (currently named Pinheiro Machado street) in 1902. The stadium bleachers were built in 1905 and its maximum capacity was 5,000 people.

The Brazil national football team played its first match in 1914, at Laranjeiras Stadium, against Exeter City, of England. The match ended 2–0 to Brazil.

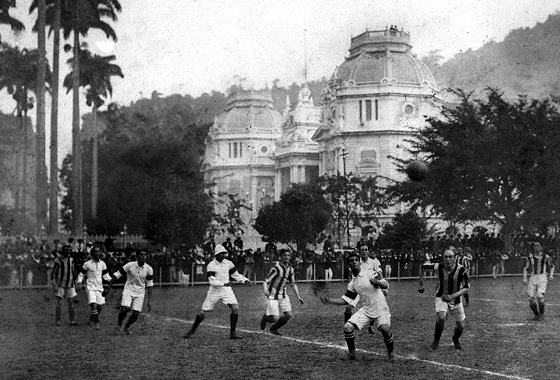
The Brazil national team's first match ever (v Exeter City) was played at das Laranjeiras in 1914

The stadium was renovated in 1919 and its capacity was expanded to 19,000 people. The re-inaugural match was played on May 11 of that year, when the Brazil national football team beat the Chile national football team 6–0. The first goal of the stadium after the re-inauguration was scored by Brazil's Friedenreich. In the same year, Brazil hosted the South American Championship, and all matches of the competition were played at Estádio das Laranjeiras. Brazil won that competition which was the first title achieved by the Seleção. The stadium was again expanded in 1922 to host South American Championship and its maximum capacity was expanded to 25,000 people. The capacity was reduced to 8,000 people in 1961 after the demolition of bleachers' part due to the construction of a viaduct at Pinheiro Machado Street.

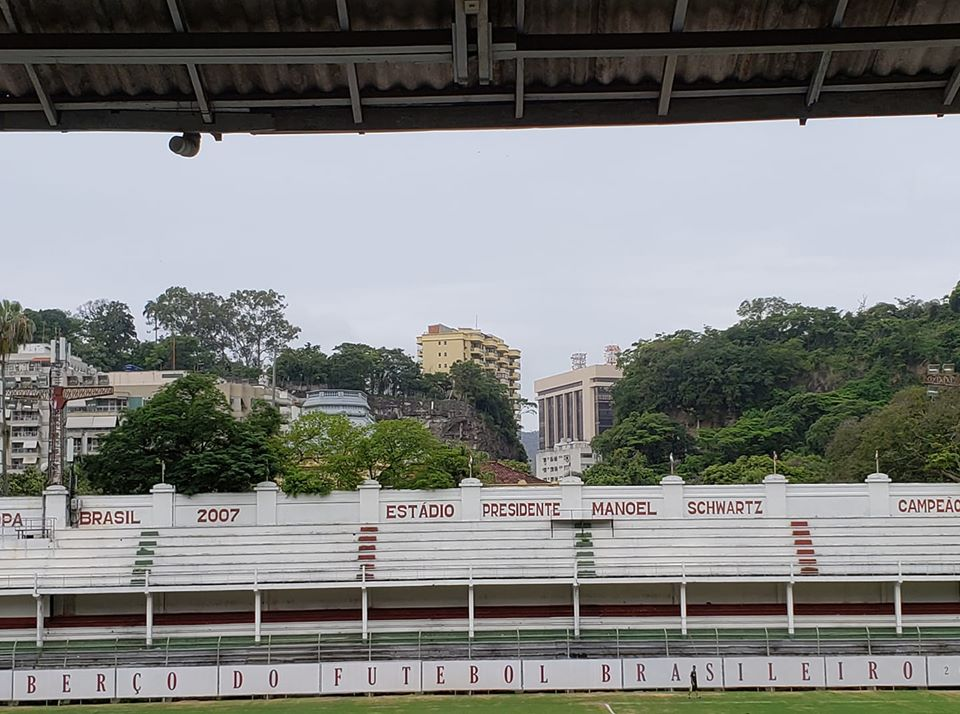
Stadium today

The stadium's attendance record for Fluminense currently stands at 25,718 people, set on June 14, 1925 when Fluminense beat Flamengo 3–1.

On 20 July 2014, Exeter City played out a 0–0 friendly draw against Fluminense under 23s in a game commemorating the 100th anniversary of Brazil's first match. Around 600 fans attended the game, with over 170 of them being Exeter fans.

Preceded by Parque Pereira; Montevideo	South American Championship; Finals Venue; 1919	Succeeded by Valparaiso Sporting Club; Viña del Mar
Preceded by Estadio Sportivo Barracas; Buenos Aires	South American Championship; Finals Venue; 1922	Succeeded by Estadio Gran Parque Central; Montevideo
