= William Hunter (footballer, born 1887) =

English footballer

William Hunter (28 July 1887 – 24 March 1949) was an English footballer. His regular position was as a forward. He was born in Sunderland. He played for Manchester United, Sunderland West End, Liverpool, Sunderland, Lincoln City, Wingate Albion, South Shields, Barnsley, Clapton Orient and Exeter City. He was 5 ft 10 1/2 in (1.79 m) tall.
