= Fred Whittaker (footballer) =

English footballer

Frederick Whittaker
Personal information
- Full name: Frederick Whittaker
- Date of birth: 1886
- Place of birth: Burnley, England
- Positions: Inside right; outside right

Senior career*
Years	Team	Apps	(Gls)
1905–1908	Burnley	60	(21)
1908–1909	Bradford City	9	(1)
1909–1912	Northampton Town	?	(?)
1912–1914	Exeter City	68	(17)
1914–19??	Millwall Athletic	?	(?)
- * Club domestic league appearances and goals

Frederick Whittaker (1886 – after 1913) was an English professional footballer who played as an inside forward and an outside forward.

During Exeter City's tour of South America in 1914, Whittaker played in every game, including in the Brazilian national team's first ever game, scoring five goals.
